= List of VFL/AFL reserves premiers =

This page is a complete chronological listing of the premiers of the Australian rules football competition known as the Victorian Junior Football League from its formation in 1919 until 1924, the VFL seconds from 1925 until 1959, the VFL reserves from 1960 until 1989 and as the AFL reserves from 1990 until it merged into the Victorian Football League at the end of the 1999 season.

Geelong won the most reserves premierships, with a total of 13. South Melbourne/Sydney was the only VFL club's reserves team never to win a reserves premiership.

== List of premiers ==
Year	Premiers	Runners-up	Score	Date	Venue
1919	Collingwood District	University A	6.11 (47) d. 4.8 (32)	11 October 1919	Melbourne Cricket Ground
1920	Collingwood District	University A	7.14 (56) d. 7.2 (44)	25 September 1920	Melbourne Cricket Ground
1921	Essendon Juniors	Collingwood District	10.9 (69) d. 8.13 (61)	15 October 1921	Melbourne Cricket Ground
1922	Collingwood District	Essendon Juniors	8.10 (58) d. 1.9 (15)	14 October 1922	Melbourne Cricket Ground
1923	Geelong	Richmond	9.12 (66) d. 5.10 (40)	20 October 1923	Melbourne Cricket Ground
1924	Geelong	Essendon	No grand final played (Note: Essendon refused to play the Grand Final at Corio Oval, meaning Geelong was awarded the flag by default.)	N/A	Corio Oval
VFL seconds name adopted
1925	Collingwood District	Fitzroy	13.16 (94) d. 11.4 (70)	10 October 1925	Melbourne Cricket Ground
1926	Carlton	Geelong	14.11 (95) d. 5.13 (43)		Melbourne Cricket Ground
1927	Carlton	South Melbourne	12.22 (94) d. 11.9 (75)		Melbourne Cricket Ground
1928	Carlton	Geelong	18.18 (126) d. 14.11 (95)		Melbourne Cricket Ground
1929	Richmond	Geelong	12.8 (80) d. 7.15 (57)		Melbourne Cricket Ground
1930	Geelong	Richmond	14.12 (96) d. 11.8 (74)		Melbourne Cricket Ground
1931	Melbourne	Geelong	8.13 (61) d. 8.6 (53)		Melbourne Cricket Ground
1932	Melbourne	Essendon	8.12 (60) d. 4.10 (34)		Melbourne Cricket Ground
1933	Melbourne	St Kilda	10.15 (75) d. 10.14 (74)		Melbourne Cricket Ground
1934	Melbourne	Geelong	15.18 (108) d. 12.4 (76)		Melbourne Cricket Ground
1935	Melbourne	Geelong	12.11 (83) d. 9.6 (60)		Melbourne Cricket Ground
1936	Footscray	Melbourne	15.11 (101) d. 6.14 (50)		Melbourne Cricket Ground
1937	Geelong	Collingwood District	12.12 (84) d. 9.11 (65)		Melbourne Cricket Ground
1938	Geelong	Footscray	12.19 (91) d. 12.8 (80)		Melbourne Cricket Ground
1939	Melbourne	Richmond	22.12 (144) d. 17.13 (115)		Melbourne Cricket Ground
1940	Collingwood	Carlton	6.16 (52) d. 3.12 (30)		Melbourne Cricket Ground
1941	Essendon	Fitzroy	12.16 (88) d. 3.12 (30)		Melbourne Cricket Ground
1942	St Kilda	Fitzroy	13.10 (88) d. 7.15 (57)		Melbourne Cricket Ground
1943	St Kilda	Fitzroy	11.14 (80) d. 8.5 (54)		Melbourne Cricket Ground
1944	Fitzroy	Collingwood	11.12 (80) d. 8.6 (54)		Melbourne Cricket Ground
1945	Footscray	Fitzroy	9.16 (70) d. 9.3 (57)		Melbourne Cricket Ground
1946	Richmond	Fitzroy	7.15 (57) d. 7.14 (56)		Melbourne Cricket Ground
1947	North Melbourne	Richmond	16.13 (109) d. 14.10 (94)		Melbourne Cricket Ground
1948	Geelong	Richmond	17.12 (114) d. 12.9 (81)		Melbourne Cricket Ground
1949	Melbourne	Essendon	17.10 (112) d. 9,14 (68)		Melbourne Cricket Ground
1950	Essendon	North Melbourne	12.8 (80) d. 8.7 (55)		Melbourne Cricket Ground
1951	Carlton	Essendon	8.15 (63) d. 7.9 (51)		Melbourne Cricket Ground
1952	Essendon	Collingwood	7.14 (56) d. 4.5 (29)		Melbourne Cricket Ground
1953	Carlton	Essendon	15.7 (97) d. 11.7 (73)		Melbourne Cricket Ground
1954	Richmond	Melbourne	10.20 (80) d. 4.9 (33)		Melbourne Cricket Ground
1955	Richmond	Footscray	13.18 (96) d. 9.12 (66)		Melbourne Cricket Ground
1956	Melbourne	South Melbourne	16.14 (110) d. 10.12 (72)		Melbourne Cricket Ground
1957	North Melbourne	Fitzroy	14.13 (97) d. 13.15 (93)		Melbourne Cricket Ground
1958	Hawthorn	Collingwood	7.11 (53) d. 6.13 (49)		Melbourne Cricket Ground
1959	Hawthorn	Fitzroy	13.18 (96) d. 9.11 (65)		Melbourne Cricket Ground
VFL reserves name adopted
1960	Geelong	Hawthorn	7.15 (57) d. 7.10 (52)		Melbourne Cricket Ground
1961	St Kilda	Geelong	7.14 (56) d. 5.16 (46)		Melbourne Cricket Ground
1962	Footscray	St Kilda	13.13 (91) d. 10.8 (68)		Melbourne Cricket Ground
1963	Geelong	St Kilda	13.12 (90) d. 7.11 (53)		Melbourne Cricket Ground
1964	Geelong	Richmond	9.13 (67) d. 6.8 (44)		Melbourne Cricket Ground
1965	Collingwood	Geelong	16.9 (105) d. 10.20 (80)		Melbourne Cricket Ground
1966	Richmond	Collingwood	14.11 (95) d. 12.12 (90)		Melbourne Cricket Ground
1967	Richmond	Collingwood	14.11 (95) d. 12.12 (90)		Melbourne Cricket Ground
1968	Essendon	Richmond	15.7 (97) d. 13.14 (92)		Melbourne Cricket Ground
1969	Melbourne	Carlton	12.16 (88) d. 8.12 (60)		Melbourne Cricket Ground
1970	Melbourne	Richmond	16.10 (106) d. 16.8 (104)		Melbourne Cricket Ground
1971	Richmond	Essendon	14.14 (98) d. 8.18 (66)		Melbourne Cricket Ground
1972	Hawthorn	Melbourne	13.10 (88) d. 12.12 (84)		Melbourne Cricket Ground
1973	Richmond	Geelong	17.18 (120) d. 8.12 (60)		Melbourne Cricket Ground
1974	Fitzroy	Footscray	26.13 (169) d. 16.12 (108)		Melbourne Cricket Ground
1975	Geelong	Richmond	16.18 (114) d. 11.17 (83)		Melbourne Cricket Ground
1976	Collingwood	North Melbourne	23.17 (155) d. 19.15 (129)		Melbourne Cricket Ground
1977	Richmond	Footscray	19.18 (132) d. 10.15 (75)		Melbourne Cricket Ground
1978	North Melbourne	Hawthorn	17.29 (131) d. 11.13 (79)		Melbourne Cricket Ground
1979	North Melbourne	Collingwood	13.14 (92) d. 9.13 (67)		VFL Park
1980	Geelong	South Melbourne	24.15 (159) d. 19.12 (126)	27 September 1980	Melbourne Cricket Ground
1981	Geelong	Essendon	12.14 (14) d. 18.6 (114)	26 September 1981	Melbourne Cricket Ground
1982	Geelong	St Kilda	19.18 (132) d. 12.11 (83)	25 September 1982	Melbourne Cricket Ground
1983	Essendon	Collingwood	19.14 (128) d. 15.9 (99)	24 September 1983	Melbourne Cricket Ground
1984	Melbourne	Carlton	11.15 (81) d. 6.9 (45)	29 September 1984	Melbourne Cricket Ground
1985	Hawthorn	Carlton	18.16 (124) d. 16.12 (108)	28 September 1985	Melbourne Cricket Ground
1986	Carlton	Footscray	22.14 (146) d. 10.12 (72)	27 September 1986	Melbourne Cricket Ground
1987	Carlton	St Kilda	18.17 (125) d. 15.15 (105)	26 September 1987	Melbourne Cricket Ground
1988	Footscray	North Melbourne	17.14 (116) d. 14.12 (96)	24 September 1988	Melbourne Cricket Ground
1989	Fitzroy	Geelong	17.12 (114) d. 16.16 (112)	30 September 1989	Melbourne Cricket Ground
VSFL/AFL reserves name adopted
1990	Carlton	Melbourne	14.15 (99) d. 11.15 (81)	6 October 1990	Melbourne Cricket Ground
1991	Brisbane	Melbourne	16.13 (109) d. 11.9 (75)	28 September 1991	Waverley Park/VFL Park
1992	Essendon	Melbourne	18.19 (127) d. 14.10 (94)	26 September 1992	Melbourne Cricket Ground
1993	Melbourne	North Melbourne	13.12 (90) d. 7.14 (56)	25 September 1993	Melbourne Cricket Ground
1994	Footscray	North Melbourne	16.16 (112) d. 13.14 (92)	1 October 1994	Melbourne Cricket Ground
1995	North Melbourne	Sydney	13.16 (94) d. 11.14 (80)	30 September 1995	Melbourne Cricket Ground
1996	North Melbourne	Essendon	23.18 (156) d. 7.10 (52)	28 September 1996	Melbourne Cricket Ground
1997	Richmond	Hawthorn	17.12 (114) d. 10.10 (70)	27 September 1997	Melbourne Cricket Ground
1998	Footscray	Essendon	20.16 (136) d. 12.8 (80)	26 September 1998	Melbourne Cricket Ground
1999	Essendon	St Kilda	20.12 (133) d. 11.10 (76)	25 September 1999	Melbourne Cricket Ground

- The 1924 VFL Grand Final was scheduled for October. When Essendon refused to play the Grand Final at Corio Oval, Geelong was awarded the reserves premiership by default.

== See also ==
- List of VFL/AFL reserves records
