= 1993 AFL reserves season =

74th season of the AFL reserve grade competition

- Date: 27 March – 25 September
- Teams: 12
- Premiers: Melbourne; 12th premiership
- Minor premiers: Melbourne
- Wooden spooners: Geelong

The 1993 AFL reserves season, also known as the 1993 VSFL season, was the 74th season of the AFL reserve grade competition, the Australian rules football competition operating as the second-tier competition to the Australian Football League (AFL). (Note: At the end of the 1991 season, the Victorian State Football League (VSFL) was established to take over administration of football in Victoria from the AFL, which was now becoming preoccupied with administration of the game nationally. This saw the reserves competition adopt the "VSFL" name, although both "AFL reserves" and "VSFL" are used to refer to the competition from 1992 until 1999.)

The premiership was won by Melbourne for the 12th time after they defeated North Melbourne in the 1993 AFL reserves grand final, held as a curtain-raiser to the 1993 AFL Grand Final at the Melbourne Cricket Ground on 25 September. This was Melbourne's last AFL reserves premiership.

Prior to the start of the 1993 season, the Brisbane Bears left the AFL reserves. The club had entered the competition just five years prior in 1989 and won a premiership in 1991.

== Ladder ==
Pos	Team	Pld	W	L	D	PF	PA	PP	Pts	Qualification
1	Melbourne (P)	22	17	5	0	2578	1636	157.58	68	Finals series
2	Richmond	22	17	5	0	2455	2024	121.29	68	Finals series
3	North Melbourne	22	12	10	0	2222	2061	107.81	48	Finals series
4	Footscray	22	11	11	0	2091	1986	105.29	44	Finals series
5	Essendon	22	11	11	0	2388	2349	101.66	44	Finals series
6	Carlton	22	11	11	0	2151	2284	94.18	44	Finals series
7	Hawthorn	22	10	11	1	2231	1964	113.59	42	
8	Collingwood	22	10	12	0	2225	2144	103.78	40	
9	St Kilda	22	9	13	0	2092	2238	93.48	36	
10	Fitzroy	22	9	13	0	2081	2531	82.22	36	
11	Sydney	22	8	14	0	1967	2571	76.51	32	
12	Geelong	22	6	15	1	2055	2748	74.78	26	

Rules for classification: 1) points; 2) percentage; 3) number of points for.

== Finals series ==
=== Grand Final ===
1993 AFL reserves grand final
Saturday, 25 September (11:05am)	Melbourne	def.	North Melbourne	Melbourne Cricket Ground
7.4 (46); 10.9 (69); 11.10 (76); 13.12 (90)	Q1; Q2; Q3; Final	0.1 (1); 4.4 (28); 5.9 (39); 7.14 (56)

=== Melbourne team ===
Melbourne
B:	39. Jeff Hilton	42. Scott Simister	40. Shane Burgmann
HB:	31. Rod Keogh	32. Andy Goodwin	15. Haydn Robins
C:	9. Darren Cuthbertson	8. Graeme Yeats	25. Jason Norrish
HF:	40. Brett Evans	1. Adrian Campbell	23. Kevin Dyson
F:	37. Andrew Lamprill	19. Darren Bennett	33. Greg Healy
Foll:	26. Greg Doyle	35. Michael Pickering	4. Chris Sullivan
Int:	52. Matthew Mackay	28. Glenn Molloy	(Note: Emergencies listed for the grand final were: 35. Bradley Campbell; 45. Daniel Clarke; 48. Brett Jeffrey; 50. David Taylor; 54. Bruce Cohen)
Coach:	Peter Russo		
