= List of VFL/AFL reserves records =

This is a list of records from the AFL reserve grade competition (previously known as the Victorian Junior Football League, VFL seconds and VFL reserves) since its inception in 1919 until it disbanded at the end of 1999.

== Club records ==
=== Premierships ===
| Titles | Club | Seasons |
|---|---|---|
| 13 | Geelong | 1923, 1924, 1930, 1937, 1938, 1948, 1960, 1963, 1964, 1975, 1980, 1981, 1982 |
| 12 | Melbourne | 1931, 1932, 1933, 1934, 1935, 1939, 1949, 1956, 1969, 1970, 1984, 1993 |
| 10 | Richmond | 1929, 1946, 1954, 1955, 1966, 1967, 1971, 1973, 1977, 1997 |
| 8 | Essendon | 1921, 1941, 1950, 1952, 1968, 1983, 1992, 1999 |
| 7 | Carlton District/Carlton | 1926, 1927, 1928, 1951, 1953, 1986, 1990 |
| 7 | Collingwood District/Collingwood | 1919, 1920, 1922, 1925, 1940, 1965, 1976 |
| 7 | North Melbourne/Kangaroos | 1947, 1957, 1967, 1978, 1979, 1995, 1996 |
| 6 | Footscray/Western Bulldogs | 1936, 1945, 1962, 1988, 1994, 1998 |
| 5 | St Kilda District/St Kilda | 1942, 1943, 1961, 1987, 1999 |
| 4 | Hawthorn | 1958, 1959, 1972, 1985 |
| 3 | Fitzroy | 1944, 1974, 1989 |
| 1 | Brisbane | 1991 |

=== Runners-up ===
| Titles | Club | Seasons |
|---|---|---|
| 10 | Essendon Juniors/Essendon | 1922, 1924, 1932, 1949, 1951, 1953, 1971, 1981, 1996, 1998 |
| 10 | Geelong | 1926, 1928, 1929, 1931, 1934, 1935, 1961, 1965, 1973, 1989 |
| 9 | Collingwood District/Collingwood | 1921, 1937, 1944, 1952, 1958, 1966, 1967, 1979, 1983 |
| 9 | Richmond | 1923, 1930, 1939, 1947, 1948, 1964, 1968, 1970, 1975 |
| 8 | Fitzroy Juniors/Fitzroy | 1925, 1941, 1942, 1943, 1945, 1946, 1957, 1959 |
| 6 | Melbourne | 1936, 1954, 1972, 1990, 1991, 1992 |
| 5 | North Melbourne/Kangaroos | 1950, 1976, 1988, 1993, 1994 |
| 5 | Carlton District/Carlton | 1940, 1969, 1984, 1985, 1987 |
| 4 | South Melbourne/Sydney | 1927, 1956, 1980, 1995 |
| 4 | St Kilda District/St Kilda | 1933, 1962, 1963, 1982 |
| 3 | Hawthorn | 1960, 1978, 1997 |
| 2 | University A | 1919, 1920 |

=== Highest scores ===
| Rank | Score | Club | Opponent | Year | Round | Venue |
|---|---|---|---|---|---|---|
| 1 | 45.20 (290) | Hawthorn | Sydney | 1987 | 7 | Sydney Cricket Ground |
| 2 | 38.27 (255) | St Kilda District | West Melbourne | 1920 | 14 | |
| 3 | 37.30 (252) | Richmond | Geelong | 1947 | 7 | |
| 4 | 38.17 (245) | North Melbourne | Sydney | 1989 | 10 | Sydney Cricket Ground |
| 5 | 38.17 (245) | Geelong | Richmond | 1989 | 22 | Kardinia Park |

== Individual records ==
=== Most goals in a game ===
| Rank | Score | Player | Club | Opponent | Year | Round | Venue |
|---|---|---|---|---|---|---|---|
| 1 | 22.4 | Bill Cubbins | St Kilda District | West Melbourne | 1920 | 14 | |

=== Most career games ===
| Rank | Games | Player | Club(s) | Career span |
|---|---|---|---|---|
| 1 | 201 | Bob Walker | Geelong | 1931–1941 |
| 2 | 170 | Alan Thaw | Essendon | 1946–1958 |
| 3 | 168 | Mark Scott | Hawthorn, St Kilda, Fitzroy | 1976–1989 |
| 4 | 164 | Mal Wishart | Richmond | 1919–1928 |
| 5 | 159 | Roy Ramsay | North Melbourne, Essendon | 1973–1987 |

=== Most games for each club ===
| Club | Games | Player | Career span |
|---|---|---|---|
| Carlton | 130 | Scott Howell | 1976–1985 |
| Collingwood | 122 | Ron Smith | 1937–1950 |
| Collingwood District | 120 | Bill Fitzgerald | 1926–1938 |
| Essendon | 170 | Alan Thaw | 1946–1958 |
| Footscray/Western Bulldogs | 114 | Robert Groenewegen | 1978–1987 |
| Geelong | 201 | Bob Walker | 1931–1941 |
| Hawthorn | 115 | Alle De Wolde | 1975–1984 |
| Melbourne | 115 | Greg Hutchison | 1975–1985 |
| Richmond | 164 | Mal Wishart | 1919–1928 |
| South Melbourne/Sydney | 112 | Mark Whitzell | 1981–1986 |

== Kicks after the siren ==
=== Goal to win ===
| Player | Team | Opponent | Year | Score | Details |
|---|---|---|---|---|---|
| Brian Rickards | Melbourne | Carlton | 1954 | 101–99 | |

=== Missed opportunities ===
| Player | Team | Opponent | Year | Score | Outcome | Details |
|---|---|---|---|---|---|---|
| Geoff Wilson | Hawthorn | Geelong | 1960 | 52–57 | Geelong won the 1960 grand final | |

== See also ==
- List of VFL/AFL reserves premiers
