= Bob Walker (footballer, born 1912) =

Australian rules footballer

Personal information
- Full name: Bob Walker
- Born: 20 April 1912
- Died: 25 March 1997 (aged 84)
- Original team: Barwon
- Height: 180 cm (5 ft 11 in)
- Weight: 82 kg (181 lb)

Playing career^{1}
Years	Club	Games (Goals)
1933–36, 1938–39	Geelong	14 (1)
- ^{1} Playing statistics correct to the end of 1939.

Bob Walker (20 April 1912 – 25 March 1997) was an Australian rules footballer who played with Geelong in the Victorian Football League (VFL).

Walker holds the record for most VFL/AFL reserves games, with 201 for Geelong between 1931 and 1941.
