= 1992 AFL reserves season =

73rd season of the AFL reserve grade competition

- Date: 21 March – 26 September
- Teams: 13
- Premiers: Essendon; 6th premiership
- Minor premiers: Essendon
- Wooden spooners: Sydney

The 1992 AFL reserves season, also known as the 1992 VSFL season, was the 73rd season of the AFL reserve grade competition, the Australian rules football competition operating as the second-tier competition to the Australian Football League (AFL).

The premiership was won by Essendon for the sixth time after they defeated Melbourne in the 1992 AFL reserves grand final, held as a curtain-raiser to the 1992 AFL Grand Final at the MCG on 26 September.

At the end of the 1991 season, the Victorian State Football League (VSFL) was established to take over administration of football in Victoria from the AFL, which was now becoming preoccupied with administration of the game nationally. This saw the reserves competition adopt the "VSFL" name, although both "AFL reserves" and "VSFL" are used to refer to the competition from 1992 until 1999.

This was the final reserves season for the Brisbane Bears, who had entered the competition just four years prior in 1989 and won a premiership the previous season in 1991.

== Ladder ==
| Pos | Team | Pld | W | L | D | PF | PA | PP | Pts | Qualification |
|---|---|---|---|---|---|---|---|---|---|---|
| 1 | Essendon (P) | 22 | 19 | 3 | 0 | 3048 | 1821 | 167.38 | 76 | Finals series |
| 2 | Carlton | 22 | 16 | 5 | 1 | 2684 | 2081 | 128.98 | 66 | Finals series |
| 3 | Melbourne | 22 | 16 | 6 | 0 | 2898 | 2136 | 135.67 | 64 | Finals series |
| 4 | Footscray | 22 | 15 | 7 | 0 | 2744 | 1870 | 146.74 | 60 | Finals series |
| 5 | St Kilda | 22 | 13 | 9 | 0 | 2365 | 2241 | 105.53 | 52 | Finals series |
| 6 | North Melbourne | 22 | 12 | 10 | 0 | 2482 | 2140 | 115.98 | 48 | Finals series |
| 7 | Collingwood | 22 | 11 | 11 | 0 | 2359 | 2463 | 95.78 | 44 | |
| 8 | Hawthorn | 22 | 9 | 12 | 1 | 2163 | 2552 | 84.76 | 38 | |
| 9 | Geelong | 22 | 9 | 12 | 0 | 2537 | 2765 | 91.75 | 36 | |
| 10 | Fitzroy | 22 | 9 | 12 | 0 | 2171 | 2715 | 79.96 | 36 | |
| 11 | Brisbane Bears | 22 | 7 | 15 | 0 | 1940 | 2752 | 70.49 | 28 | |
| 12 | Richmond | 22 | 4 | 18 | 0 | 1969 | 2727 | 72.20 | 16 | |
| 13 | Sydney | 22 | 2 | 20 | 0 | 2108 | 3205 | 65.77 | 8 | |

Rules for classification: 1) points; 2) percentage; 3) number of points for.

== Finals series ==
=== Grand Final ===
1992 AFL reserves Grand Final
Saturday, 26 September (11:00am) | Essendon | def. | Melbourne | Melbourne Cricket Ground
2.5 (17); 9.11 (65); 14.16 (100); 18.19 (127) | Q1; Q2; Q3; Final | 2.3 (15); 3.5 (23); 7.9 (51); 14.10 (94) | Umpires: Andrew Coates, Brett Allen
