= 1924 VJFL season =

6th season of the Victorian Junior Football League (VJFL)

- Date: 26 April – October
- Teams: 10
- Premiers: Geelong; 2nd premiership
- Minor premiers: Geelong; 1st minor premiership
- Wooden spooners: Melbourne; 2nd wooden spoon

The 1924 VJFL season was the 6th season of the Victorian Junior Football League (VJFL), the Australian rules football competition operating as the second-tier competition to the Victorian Football League (VFL).

Geelong was awarded their second VJFL premiership after Essendon refused to travel to Corio Oval for the grand final.

This was the final season under the VJFL name, with the competition renamed to VFL seconds beginning in 1925. This was also the final season for Coburg and Leopold, with the latter replaced by a South Melbourne reserves team (known as South Melbourne Second Eighteen).

== Ladder ==
The round 13 match between Richmond and Fitzroy on 19 July was won by Richmond 11.12 (78) to 10.9 (69) − however, the match was awarded to Fitzroy on 28 August after they protested that Richmond player J. Gale did not have the required permit.

Pos	Team	Pld	W	L	D	Pts
1	Geelong (P)	18	15	3	0	60
2	Richmond	18	14	4	0	56
3	Essendon	18	13	5	0	52
4	Fitzroy	18	13	5	0	52
5	Leopold	18	10	8	0	40
6	Coburg	18	10	8	0	40
7	Collingwood District	18	7	10	1	30
8	Fitzroy	18	4	13	1	18
9	St Kilda	18	2	16	0	8
10	Melbourne	18	1	17	0	4
