= 1923 VJFL season =

5th season of the Victorian Junior Football League (VJFL)

- Date: 5 May – 20 October
- Teams: 10
- Premiers: Geelong; 1st premiership
- Minor premiers: Richmond; 1st minor premiership
- Wooden spooners: Melbourne; 1st wooden spoon

The 1923 VJFL season was the 5th season of the Victorian Junior Football League (VJFL), the Australian rules football competition operating as the second-tier competition to the Victorian Football League (VFL).

Geelong won its first VJFL premiership, defeating Richmond by 26 points. The 18-round home-and-away season began on 5 May and ended on 15 September.

== Background ==
Prior to the start of the season, representatives from the VJFL asked the VFL to allow the names of teams to be changed to 'Second Eighteen' − for instance, Carlton District would become Carlton Second Eighteen, and known simply as Carlton.

The move was formally approved by the VFL on 27 April, although Collingwood District retained its name.

== Ladder ==
Pos	Team	Pld	W	L	D	Pts
1	Richmond	18	13	5	0	60
2	Collingwood District	18				56
3	Geelong (P)	18				56
4	Essendon	18				44
5	Leopold	18				36
6	Coburg	18				36
7	Carlton	18				32
8	Fitzroy	18				20
9	St Kilda	18				16
10	Melbourne	18				4

== Finals series ==
=== Grand final ===
	Grand final
Saturday, 20 October	Geelong 9.12 (66)	def.	Richmond 5.10 (40)	Melbourne Cricket Ground
