= 1990 AFL reserves season =

71st season of the AFL reserve grade competition

- Date: 31 March – 6 October
- Teams: 13
- Premiers: Carlton; 8th premiership
- Minor premiers: Carlton
- Wooden spooners: Richmond

The 1990 AFL reserves season was the 71st season of the AFL reserve grade competition, the Australian rules football competition operating as the second-tier competition to the Australian Football League (AFL).

The premiership was won by Carlton after they defeated Melbourne in the 1990 AFL reserves Grand Final, held as a curtain-raiser to the 1990 AFL Grand Final at the MCG on 6 October.

This was the first season under the AFL reserves name, after the competition was renamed when the Victorian Football League (VFL) was renamed to the AFL.

== Ladder ==
Pos	Team	Pld	W	L	D	PF	PA	PP	Pts	Qualification
1	Carlton (P)	20	16	4	0	2495	1882	132.57	64	Finals series
2	Melbourne	20	16	4	0	2184	1751	124.73	64	Finals series
3	North Melbourne	20	15	5	0	2664	1820	146.37	60	Finals series
4	Fitzroy	20	12	7	1	2221	1822	121.90	50	Finals series
5	Footscray	20	12	8	0	2076	1742	119.17	48	Finals series
6	Collingwood	20	10	10	0	2005	2001	100.20	40	
7	Geelong	20	9	11	0	2200	2294	95.90	36	
8	Brisbane Bears	20	8	12	0	1776	1998	88.89	32	
9	Essendon	20	7	13	0	2227	2192	101.60	28	
10	Sydney	20	7	13	0	1838	2080	88.37	28	
11	Hawthorn	20	7	13	0	1863	2435	76.51	28	
12	St Kilda	20	6	13	1	1926	2418	79.65	26	
13	Richmond	20	4	16	0	1685	2725	61.83	16	

Rules for classification: 1) points; 2) percentage; 3) number of points for.

== Finals series ==
=== Grand Final ===
1990 AFL reserves Grand Final
Saturday, 28 September	Carlton	def.	Melbourne	MCG
3.6 (24); 6.8 (44); 9.11 (65); 14.15 (99)	Q1; Q2; Q3; Final	2.4 (16); 7.11 (53); 11.11 (77); 11.15 (81)

==== Carlton team ====
Carlton 1990 grand final team
B:	19. Stephen Edgar	45. Warren McKenzie	38. Shane Robertson
HB:	36. Tim Rieniets	22. Ian Aitken	15. Simon Verbeek
C:	43. Chris Bond	47. Andrew McKinnon	40. Brett Ratten
HF:	14. Michael Sexton	6. Jon Dorotich	2. Dominic Fotia
F:	30. Fraser Murphy	29. Simon Minton-Connell	17. Mark Naley
Foll:	24. Jamie Dunlop	32. David Glascott (c)	19. Andrew Phillips
Int:	48. Ashley Matthews	34. Anthony Loone	
Coach:	Rod Ashman		
