= 1920 VJFL season =

2nd season of the Victorian Junior Football League (VJFL)

- Date: 1 May – 25 September
- Teams: 9
- Premiers: Collingwood District; 2nd premiership

The 1920 VJFL season was the 2nd season of the Victorian Junior Football League (VJFL), the Australian rules football competition operating as the second-tier competition to the Victorian Football League (VFL).

Collingwood District won its second premiership, defeating University A for the second consecutive year.

== Background ==
In the inaugural VJFL season, a second University Football Club team − University B − served as an affiliate for Melbourne. The team left the competition prior to the 1920 season, and Melbourne entered its own reserves side.

This was the second and final VJFL season for West Melbourne. The club faced multiple heavy losses in throughout 1920, including a 197-point loss against Carlton District and a 229-point loss against St Kilda District. They were replaced by Essendon Juniors in 1921.

== Finals series ==
=== Semi-finals ===
	Semi-finals
Saturday, 11 September (12:50 pm)	Carlton District 8.5 (53)	def. by	University A 9.15 (69)	Melbourne Cricket Ground
Carlton District led 7.2 (44) to 4.9 (33) at half-time, with the game played in "atrocious conditions".

=== Grand final ===
	Grand final
Saturday, 25 September	Collingwood District 7.14 (56)	def.	University A 7.2 (44)	Melbourne Cricket Ground
