= 1925 VFL seconds season =

7th season of the Victorian Football League seconds competition

- Date: 2 May – 10 October 1925
- Teams: 12
- Premiers: Collingwood District; 4th premiership
- Minor premiers: Collingwood District; 5th minor premiership
- Wooden spooners: Hawthorn; 1st wooden spoon

The 1925 VFL seconds season was the 7th season of the VFL seconds competition, the Australian rules football competition operating as the second-tier competition to the Victorian Football League (VFL). This was the first season under this name, having been renamed from the Victorian Junior Football League (VJFL) at the end of the previous season.

Collingwood District won their fourth premiership, defeating Fitzroy by 24 points. The 18-round home-and-away season began on 2 May 1925, with all teams having one bye.

Footscray, Hawthorn and North Melbourne all joined the competition, having all also been admitted into the VFL as senior clubs. Coburg and Leopold left the competition, with the latter replaced by a South Melbourne reserves team (known as South Melbourne Second Eighteen).

== Ladder ==
Pos	Team	Pld	W	L	D	Pts
1	Collingwood District (P)	17	16	1	0	64
2	South Melbourne	17	13	4	0	52
3	Fitzroy	17	13	4	0	52
4	Carlton	17	13	4	0	52
5	Richmond	17	10	7	0	40
6	Geelong	17	8	8	1	34
7	Essendon	17	8	9	0	32
8	St Kilda	17	7	10	0	28
9	Footscray	17	5	12	0	20
10	North Melbourne	17	4	13	0	16
11	Melbourne	17	2	15	0	8
12	Hawthorn	17	1	15	1	6

== Finals series ==
=== Grand final ===
	Grand final
Saturday, 10 October	Collingwood District 13.16 (94)	def.	Fitzroy 11.4 (70)	Melbourne Cricket Ground
