= Allan Giffard =

Australian rules footballer

Personal information
- Full name: Allan Giffard
- Born: 2 October 1963 (age 63); Brisbane
- Original team: Sherwood
- Height: 188 cm (6 ft 2 in)
- Weight: 83 kg (183 lb)
- Position: Half forward

Playing career^{1}
Years	Club	Games (Goals)
1987	Brisbane Bears	1 (0)
- ^{1} Playing statistics correct to the end of 1987.

Career highlights
- 2 x B&F Sherwood Magpies; QAFL B&F runner up 1984; Represented Queensland 12 times.

Allan Giffard (born 2 October 1963) is a former Australian rules footballer who played with the Brisbane Bears in the Victorian Football League (VFL).

Giffard was a member of Brisbane's squad for their inaugural season in 1987.

A local recruit from Sherwood, Giffard played just once for the Bears. That game was against Footscray at Western Oval in round nine and he had six disposals. Prior to joining the Bears, he played over 100 senior games with the Sherwood Magpies, where he won two best and fairest awards and kicked over 100 goals in two consecutive seasons. He was runner up in the QAFL best and Fairest award in 1984 and also played 12 representative games for Queensland. After being delisted by the Bears he played with the South Launceston Bulldogs in the Tasmanian Football League.
