= 1989 VFL reserves season =

70th season of the VFL reserve grade competition

- Date: 1 April – 30 September 1989
- Teams: 13
- Premiers: Fitzroy; 3rd premiership
- Minor premiers: Carlton
- Gardiner Medallist: Michael Kol (Geelong – 18 votes)

The 1989 VFL reserves season was the 70th season of the VFL reserve grade competition, the Australian rules football competition operating as the second-tier competition to the Victorian Football League (VFL).

Fitzroy won the premiership for the third time after defeating Geelong in the 1989 VFL reserves grand final, held as a curtain-raiser to the 1989 VFL Grand Final at the MCG on 30 September. This was the last time Fitzroy won a VFL/AFL premiership in any grade before their 1996 merger with the Brisbane Bears.

This was also the last season under the VFL reserves name, before the competition was renamed to the AFL reserves when the VFL was renamed to the Australian Football League (AFL) in 1990.

== Ladder ==
Following their Round 1 match on 1 April, both St Kilda and Brisbane were found to have fielded unregistered players. As a result, the VFL fined both clubs and ordered that they receive zero premiership points for the match.

Pos	Team	Pld	W	L	D	NR	PF	PA	PP	Pts	Qualification
1	Carlton	20	16	4	0	0	2312	1781	129.81	64	Finals series
2	Geelong	20	15	5	0	0	2721	1770	153.73	60	Finals series
3	Essendon	20	15	5	0	0	2057	1645	125.05	60	Finals series
4	Footscray	20	13	7	0	0	2096	1541	136.02	52	Finals series
5	Fitzroy (P)	20	13	7	0	0	2119	1711	123.85	52	Finals series
6	North Melbourne	20	12	8	0	0	2062	1731	119.12	48	
7	Collingwood	20	11	9	0	0	1989	1781	115.77	44	
8	Hawthorn	20	9	10	1	0	1987	2136	93.02	38	
9	Sydney	20	9	11	0	0	1652	1790	92.29	36	
10	Richmond	20	7	13	0	0	1561	2370	65.86	28	
11	Melbourne	20	4	16	0	0	1581	2307	68.53	16	
12	Brisbane Bears	20	3	16	0	1	1779	2336	76.16	12	
13	St Kilda	20	1	17	1	1	1708	2788	61.26	6	

Rules for classification: 1) points; 2) percentage; 3) number of points for.

== Finals series ==
=== Qualifying and elimination finals ===
	Elimination final
Saturday, 9 September (11:10am)	Footscray 6.10 (46)	def.	Fitzroy 15.14 (104)	VFL Park

	Qualifying final
Sunday, 10 September (11:10am)	Geelong 16.10 (106)	def.	Essendon 11.14 (80)	MCG

=== Semi-finals ===
	Semi-finals
Saturday, 16 September (11:10am)	Essendon 8.11 (59)	def. by	Fitzroy 8.18 (66)	VFL Park
Saturday, 17 September (11:10am)	Carlton 12.16 (88)	def. by	Geelong 17.13 (115)	MCG

=== Preliminary final ===
	Preliminary final
Saturday, 23 September (11:10am)	Carlton 11.15 (81)	def.	Fitzroy 16.16 (112)	VFL Park

=== Grand Final ===
1989 VFL reserves grand final
Saturday, 30 September (11:10am)	Geelong	def. by	Fitzroy	MCG
3.3 (21); 9.5 (59); 15.10 (100); 16.16 (112)	Q1; Q2; Q3; Final	2.4 (16); 7.7 (49); 11.10 (76); 17.12 (114)
