= Jack McDonagh =

Australian rules footballer, born 1914

Personal information
- Full name: John Frederick McDonagh
- Born: 10 June 1914; Footscray, Victoria
- Died: 25 February 2001 (aged 86)
- Original team: Gordon Fliers
- Height: 179 cm (5 ft 10 in)
- Weight: 82 kg (181 lb)

Playing career^{1}
Years	Club	Games (Goals)
1936	Footscray	14 (4)
1938–40	Williamstown (VFA)	46 (12)
- ^{1} Playing statistics correct to the end of 1940.

John Frederick McDonagh (10 June 1914 – 25 February 2001) was an Australian rules footballer who played with Footscray in the Victorian Football League (VFL).

He played with Melbourne Seconds in 1937 before transferring to Williamstown VFA in 1938. McDonagh was awarded the best clubman trophy in his first season with Williamstown and went on to play 43 games and kick 13 goals with 'Town up until the end of 1940. McDonagh was full-back in the 1939 premiership side and was also awarded trophies for the best player in the 1939 finals series and best attendance at training. He went to West Melbourne as captain-coach in 1941, leading them to a premiership victory over South Melbourne Districts in the VFL Sub-Districts. He later served in the Australian Army during World War II after enlisting in March 1941.

McDonagh returned to Williamstown and played in the Seconds under captain-coach Jack Vinall in 1947 at the age of 33. The team lost the preliminary final to Prahran by four points, 13.11 (89) to 12.13 (85)
