= 1922 VJFL season =

4th season of the Victorian Junior Football League (VJFL)

- Date: 6 May – 14 October
- Teams: 10
- Premiers: Collingwood District; 3rd premiership
- Minor premiers: Collingwood District; 4th minor premiership
- Wooden spooners: St Kilda

The 1922 VJFL season was the 4th season of the Victorian Junior Football League (VJFL), the Australian rules football competition operating as the second-tier competition to the Victorian Football League (VFL).

Collingwood District won its third premiership, defeating reigning premiers Essendon Juniors. The sides had met the previous year in the 1921 grand final.

Geelong joined the competition at the start of the season, bringing the total number of teams in the VJFL to 10 − one more than the amount of senior VFL clubs. The 19-round home-and-away season began on 7 May and ended on 16 September, with all teams having one bye.

== Ladder ==
Richmond were awarded a win on protest despite having a bye in round 17.

| Pos | Team | Pld | W | L | D | Pts |
|---|---|---|---|---|---|---|
| 1 | Collingwood District (P) | 18 | | | | 56 |
| 2 | Essendon Juniors | 18 | | | | 54 |
| 3 | Geelong | 18 | | | | 50 |
| 4 | Fitzroy Juniors | 18 | | | | 50 |
| 5 | Richmond | 18 | 11 | 8 | 0 | 44 |
| 6 | Coburg | 18 | | | | 38 |
| 7 | Carlton District | 18 | 9 | 8 | 1 | 34 |
| 8 | Melbourne | 18 | | | | 16 |
| 9 | Leopold | 18 | | | | 16 |
| 10 | St Kilda | 18 | | | | 4 |

== Finals series ==
=== Grand final ===
| | Grand final |
| Saturday, 14 October | Collingwood District 8.10 (58) | def. | Essendon Juniors 1.9 (15) | Melbourne Cricket Ground |
