= John Bourke (Australian footballer) =

Former Australian rules footballer

Personal information
- Full name: John Bourke
- Born: c. 1962 (age 63–64)
- Height / weight: 194 cm
- Position: Forward

Playing career
Years	Club	Games (Goals)
1982–1984	Preston	29 (104)
1984–1985	Collingwood reserves	14 (20)

Career highlights
- Preston leading goalkicker: 1983

John Bourke (born c. 1962) is a former Australian rules footballer who played for Preston in the Victorian Football Association (VFA) and Collingwood reserves in the Victorian Football League (VFL) reserves competition.

Bourke played in back-to-back premierships for Preston in 1983 and 1984 while kicking regular bags of goals as a young forward. However, he is best known for shoving an umpire during a match for the Collingwood reserves team in 1985, resulting in a lengthy suspension.

== Career ==
=== VFA ===
Bourke played for the Preston Football Club in the Victorian Football Association, kicking 104 goals in his 29 games for the club. He kicked six goals in the club's 1983 grand final win over Geelong West, and five goals in their 1984 grand final win over Frankston. He was also the club's leading goalkicker in 1983, with 51 goals for the season.

=== VFL reserves ===
Bourke joined the Collingwood Football Club as a reserves player in 1984.

On 8 April 1985, during a VFL reserves game, Bourke kicked Sydney ruckman Pat Foy in the groin in response to Foy tagging him throughout the game. When umpire Phil Waight attempted to report Bourke for the incident, Bourke shoved him to the ground and kicked him, and he also made contact with a Collingwood runner who was attempting to take him off the ground before running into the stands to attack a Swans fan.

The match was being broadcast on the Seven Network, with commentator Ray Jordon crying: "You've gotta take the boy off!" as the incident unfolded.

As a result, Bourke was handed a suspension of ten years, equivalent to 240 matches. It was later reduced to six years.
