= Jamie Dunlop =

Australian rules footballer

Personal information
- Full name: Jamie Dunlop
- Born: 5 January 1966 (age 60)
- Original team: Fawkner
- Height: 196 cm (6 ft 5 in)
- Weight: 85 kg (187 lb)
- Position: Ruckman

Playing career^{1}
Years	Club	Games (Goals)
1987–1990	Carlton	21 (3)
- ^{1} Playing statistics correct to the end of 1990.

Jamie Dunlop (born 5 January 1966) is a former Australian rules footballer who played with Carlton in the Australian Football League (AFL).
