= 1921 VJFL season =

3rd season of the Victorian Junior Football League (VJFL)

- Date: 7 May – 15 October 1921
- Teams: 9
- Premiers: Essendon Juniors; 1st premiership
- Minor premiers: Collingwood District; 3rd minor premiership
- Wooden spooners: Leopold

The 1921 VJFL season was the 3rd season of the Victorian Junior Football League (VJFL), the Australian rules football competition operating as the second-tier competition to the Victorian Football League (VFL). The home-and-away season began on 7 May and ended on 17 September.

Essendon Juniors won its first premiership in its first season, defeating reigning premiers Collingwood District.

In addition to Essendon Juniors, Coburg joined the VJFL in 1921, replacing University A and West Melbourne (the junior team of Essendon). Coburg had been playing in the Melbourne District Football Association and won three premierships in that competition, the most recent in 1920.

== Ladder ==
Pos	Team	Pld	W	L	D	Pts
1	Collingwood District	16				60
2	Fitzroy Juniors	16				46
3	Coburg	16				44
4	Essendon Juniors (P)	16				42
5	Richmond	16	10	6	0	40
6	Carlton District	16	7	9	0	28
7	St Kilda District	16				12
8	Melbourne	16				8
9	Leopold	16				4

== Finals series ==
=== Semi-finals ===
	Semi-finals
Saturday, 1 October	Collingwood District 10.4 (64)	def. by	Coburg 9.13 (67)	Melbourne Cricket Ground

=== Grand Final ===
	1921 VFJL Grand Final
Saturday, 15 October	Essendon Juniors 10.9 (69)	def.	Collingwood District 8.13 (61)	Melbourne Cricket Ground
