= Brisbane Bears =

Former Australian rules football club

Names
- Full name: Brisbane Bears Football Club
- Nickname: Bears

Club details
- Founded: 7 October 1986; 40 years ago (Absorbed football operations of the Fitzroy Football Club on 1 November 1996 to compete as The Brisbane Lions)
- Colours: Maroon Gold White
- Competition: Australian Football League
- Premierships: AFL reserves (1): 1991
- Ground: Carrara Stadium (1987–1992); The Gabba (1991, 1993–1996)

Uniforms
Home	Original

The Brisbane Bears were a professional Australian rules football club based in Brisbane, Queensland, now known as the Brisbane Lions. Granted a Victorian Football League (VFL) licence in 1986, it was the first privately owned club in the history of the competition and debuted in the 1987 VFL season.

The club initially played home matches at Carrara Stadium on the Gold Coast (this stadium was redeveloped many years after the relocation of the Bears to facilitate home matches for expansion club the Gold Coast Suns). After many years of negotiation, in 1991 the AFL and the Bears convinced the Queensland Government to redevelop The Gabba facilitating a permanent move to the venue for the 1993 season after which the club experienced a period of success.

During its history, the club enjoyed only a modest amount of success, being the first non-Victorian side to win an AFL reserves premiership in 1991. Despite the success in its later years, the club struggled to shake the derisive tags which included "Carrara Koalas" (in reference to the Gold Coast home and the somewhat tame marsupial) and "Bad News Bears" which drew comparisons of its management similar to the hit 1970s movie.

The club came close to folding prior to its move to Brisbane and the AFL began preparing a contingency for its demise in the event that the move was to fail. While the Bears improved on the field, the club continued to struggle financially. At the end of the 1996 season, the AFL helped negotiate a deal with the Fitzroy Football Club administrator whereby the Bears took over Fitzroy's AFL assets and operations and as a condition of that deal, on 1 November 1996, Brisbane Bears members voted to change the club's name to the Brisbane Bears-Fitzroy Football Club (BBFFC or Brisbane Lions), who participate in the AFL today. The Bears played in 220 VFL/AFL matches over ten seasons, with 70 wins, 148 losses and 2 draws.

== History ==
=== 1980s: Race for a Brisbane licence ===
From the mid-1980s, several competing parties had proposed a Brisbane licence for the VFL.

The idea of a Brisbane-based VFL club had begun in 1984, with former actor and businessman Paul Cronin planning on purchasing a licence from the VFL believing that the VFL could not survive successfully without a national competition, however there were some in the VFL management that did not agree, most notably Alan Schwab. Cronin believed that Queensland was uniquely positioned in that it had an existing base in the Queensland Australian Football League (QAFL). Migration from the southern states saw the QAFL go through a period of expansion into the Gold and Sunshine Coasts in the 1970s and despite being less popular than the Queensland Rugby League and Queensland Rugby Union had grown to include a number of well established, wealthy and well supported clubs. The early 1980s had also seen in Queensland and QAFL recruited players making an impact in the VFL, including Frank Dunell, Warren Jones, Gary Shaw, Zane Taylor and young stars like Scott McIvor and Jason Dunstall. Cronin approached premier Joh Bjelke-Petersen in November 1985 to garner government support for the idea.

In 1985, the QAFL had decided that pushing for a Melbourne-based club to relocate to Brisbane was the most viable option. The idea was helped in 1986 when incoming chair Ross Oakley's interest in mergers and relocations to help the VFL expand into a national competition.

In June 1985, Brisbane sports promoter John Brown announced he would bid for a Brisbane licence along with entertainment promoter Michael Edgely. On 22 May 1986, at the Brisbane Parkroyal Hotel, the QAFL president John Collins and Ken Murphy announced plans to lobby for a Brisbane-based VFL team the QAFL still pursuing the relocation of an existing team.

The VFL's Jack Hamilton flew to Brisbane in July 1986 to explore the options including club relocations (but denied that it was for Fitzroy), stating to the media that a Brisbane team would be possible in 1987 if a vacancy was available. He later stated that Brisbane was the preferred city for VFL expansion and that the VFL had hoped that it could retain all of its existing clubs during the expansion phase.

A third bidder a consortium headed by Perth millionaire Alastair Norwood (head of Jeans West) was announced shortly after Brown's bid.

The QAFL joined as a fourth bidder for the new licence, but stated that it was open to forming a consortium with any of the other three bids. Ken Murphy decided that Cronin's motives for the licence were genuine and aligned with the QAFL. Brown initiated discussions with North Melbourne Football Club in an attempt to lure it to Brisbane, however the Kangaroos rejected the proposal. In response to the moves by the other bids, on 19 August 1986, the QAFL and Cronin joined forces.

Struggling Fitzroy Football Club, in conjunction with the VFL, began investigating a relocation to Brisbane in 1987. However the club under Leon Wiegard voted to remain in Melbourne. Struggling Richmond Football Club under Alan Bond proposed to play half its games in Brisbane in 1987. The move was seen as a threat of relocation and met strong opposition, led by Kevin Bartlett who rallied to stop the proposal, though the club came very close to folding the following year. Despite the setback, the VFL decided to push forward with the plans for expansion into Brisbane.

At the end of 1986, the VFL Commission announced plans to set up privately owned clubs based in Perth and Brisbane, ignoring a strong bid from ACTAFL for a team in Canberra, motivated by the need to sell multimillion-dollar licences to save a number of Victorian clubs which were struggling financially. The VFL at the time set a price of $4 million AUD for a licence to enter the league with the proceeds to be split among the existing clubs.

On 1 October 1986, the VFL board was announced that teams from Brisbane (Brisbane Bears) and Perth (West Coast Eagles) would compete in the Victorian Football League (VFL) from 1987 and that no $2.8 million AUD rescue package would be offered for struggling Fitzroy. The VFL Commission initially chose to grant John Brown's consortium Browns International Sport Limited the licence.

=== Cronin, Skase licence and private ownership ===
Cronin refused to accept the VFL's decision and increased its bid to $4.8 million, or up to $6 million if Fitzroy relocated to Brisbane and became the Brisbane Lions. Unable to secure access to a stadium, Cronin's QAFL consortium drew up plans for a $7 million new stadium on vacant land at Boondall (on the site of what became the Brisbane Entertainment Centre). Brisbane's main outdoor venues, The Gabba and Brisbane Showgrounds' Main Oval, were unavailable due to long-term contracts and The Gabba was home to the greyhound racing club and was encircled by a dog racing track. The QAFL believed that the club should be based in Brisbane and supported the redevelopment of The Gabba (owned by the Gabba Trust), or secondary options of a new stadium at Boondall or Chandler (on land owned by the government).

With the higher price offered VFL withdrew its support for Browns and extended the selection process. The consortia found a financial backer in millionaire entrepreneur and Qintex owner Christopher Skase. In response Norwood's syndicate withdrew from the bidding. Cronin lobbied every VFL club president individually to gain their support for the bid. The VFL Commission voted unanimously to award the Cronin-Skase-QAFL bid the licence. The club was given very little time to establish itself, and was without a home ground.

==== Coach and player signings ====
Recently retired Hawthorn footballer Peter Knights on 27 October was announced coach just weeks later getting the nod over candidates John Todd, Ron Barassi and Alex Jesaulenko. Skase was appointed deputy chairman and Qintex General Manager Ian Curtis was also appointed to the club's board.

In December 1986, the branding and Brisbane Bears name was leaked to the public. The new marketing department intended for the bear mascot to resemble Dreamworld's mascot Kenny to appeal to children and tourists. They created two variations of the bear, a smiling bear for the VFL logo and an "angry bear" for games that would appear roaring for matches and many of the marketing and promotional materials for the club. The club unveiled a playing strip consisting of a gold with a maroon yoke and a triangular "BB" logo intended to represent a stylised map of the club's home state, Queensland, with the outline of a koala head appearing inside of the larger B. Maroon was chosen as the state colour of Queensland and gold as symbolic of the Queensland sunshine.

Collingwood's Mark Williams was the new club's first player signing. Other marquee signings were Geoff Raines and Jim Edmond, however most of the other players were from the SANFL and the WAFL. Most notably there were few local Queenslanders in the side. Queenslanders were approached, however there were very few playing in the VFL level at the time. In search of a marquee Queenslander, the Bears approached up and coming Hawthorn Football Club full-forward Jason Dunstall with a $2 million 10-year deal to spearhead the club, however he declined. The Bears were exposed for their lack of local talent but among the local names in the inaugural squad were Gary Shaw, Frank Dunell, Tony Beckett, Darren Carlson, Allan Giffard and Stuart Glascott. However few of the Queenslanders in the side made an impact.

Upon its admission, the Bears did not have a large reserve of local players from which to compile a VFL-standard playing list. To assist with its inaugural playing list, the VFL arranged for every other club to provide at least two players; understandably, other clubs were averse to providing top-line players and few of the players provided were of a high quality. The Bears pursued a number of stars aggressively and did manage a few key signings, including Collingwood's captain Mark Williams, and 1985 Brownlow Medallist Brad Hardie. A significant proportion of the player list was recruited from the South Australian National Football League and West Australian Football League. Mark Mickan, a 6 ft 5 in (196 cm) ruckman recruited from West Adelaide, was appointed captain of the Bears in its inaugural season.

==== Stadium selection and QAFL vs Skase legal dispute ====
The club's board, however, were of the opinion the club would not be viable without if it did not own its own stadium. On 18 December 1986, the club nominated the Carrara Oval on the Gold Coast as a temporary venue with a capacity of 20,000 mooted through the use of temporary stands through the use of metal bleachers. The choice of venue was reported to be the insistence of Skase. Cronin officially announced the home ground on 23 December. While it raised the ire of the QAFL who were adamant that the club be Brisbane based, the decision to base the club over 70 kilometres from its namesake baffled many. Skase's Gold Coast business interests were reportedly a major factor, with its proximity to his Sheraton Grand Mirage Resort development at Southport under construction at his subsequent promotion of corporate hospitality packages to wealthy southern travellers. Skase argued that with a playing surface the same dimensions as the Melbourne Cricket Ground the venue was the ideal choice. Nevertheless, the decision would begin a bitter and long protracted battle between the QAFL and the Bears which was not resolved until 1991.

Skase spent $1 million redeveloping Carrara Oval over a 10-week period at the beginning of 1987. This included the erection of temporary stands, club rooms and facilities.

=== Knights era ===
Chart of yearly ladder positions for Brisbane Bears in VFL/AFL

The Bears won their first game in the VFL against North Melbourne at the Melbourne Cricket Ground 19.23 (137) to 15.14 (104) in front of 14,096 fans, and also won its second game, but ultimately fell towards the bottom of the ladder. The club avoided the wooden spoon by beating Richmond in the final round, and finished with six wins. The club attracted 98,616 fans to the eleven matches at Carrara Oval, an average of 8,965 per game, which was the lowest in the competition behind Fitzroy's 11,498. By contrast, the other new 1987 team the West Coast Eagles, with Australian rules football long established as the major football code in Perth, attracted 291,317 to their home games at Subiaco Oval and the WACA at an average of 26,483 per game.

In 1988, a rift developed between the QAFL and the Bears, who had refused a move to Brisbane. The QAFL responded by threatening to secure a second Queensland licence for a Brisbane-based team by 1991.

The club again recruited aggressively, landing Sydney Swans glamour spearhead Warwick Capper. In 1988 and 1989 the club suffered some severe defeats, finishing 13th and 10th respectively. Knights was sacked with eight rounds to play in the 1989 season. The club psychologist, Paul Feltham, took charge of the team for the remainder of the year.

In 1993, staving off media rumours that the Bears would merge with the Sydney Swans to form a combined Queensland/New South Wales team, the Northern Swans, or be relocated to Tasmania, Australian Capital Territory or New Zealand.

By this stage, the club was also under severe financial pressure. Attendances had been very poor due to poor performances and the long distance between Gold Coast and Brisbane and also due to the admission of the Brisbane Broncos which achieved the goal set by Queensland Rugby League general manager Ross Livermore of marketing and promotions interference against the threat of the VFL's expansion, with the team making their debut in the 1988 NSWRL season.

=== AFL re-licences, Pelerman buys the Bears ===
The collapse of Skase's business empire and his sudden departure for Spain in late 1989 almost resulted in the end of the club. Over the ensuing preseason the players threatened strike action, but Cronin resigned, the club was taken over by the AFL, re-sold to Gold Coast hospitality businessman Reuben Pelerman, and a crisis was averted.

The AFL spent significant amounts of money to help the Bears survive over the coming years, and the club was provided with priority draft picks and special recruiting zones to give it access to some of the nation's best talent, which over the next few years allowed the club to recruit future stars such as Michael Voss, Jason Akermanis, Clark Keating, Steven Lawrence and Darryl White.

Four-time QAFL premiership coach Norm Dare was appointed as coach in 1990, but after failing to improve from the Bears position from successive wooden spoons, he was sacked at the end of the season.

=== Walls era ===
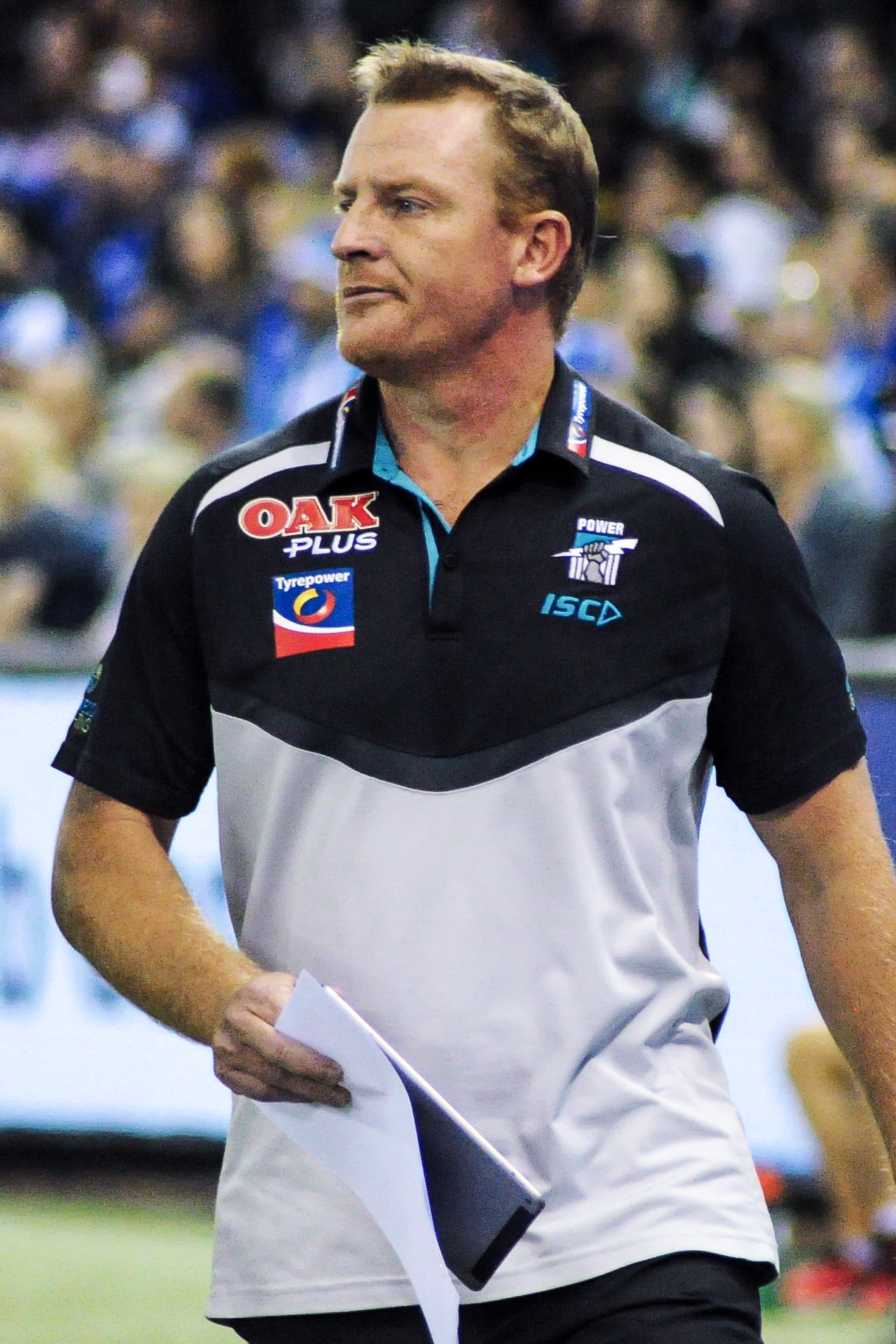
Queenslander Michael Voss debuted in 1992 at age 17, becoming the youngest-ever player to play a senior game for the club. He went on to win two Best & Fairests between 1995 and 1996 and the only Bear to win a Brownlow, in the club's last year.

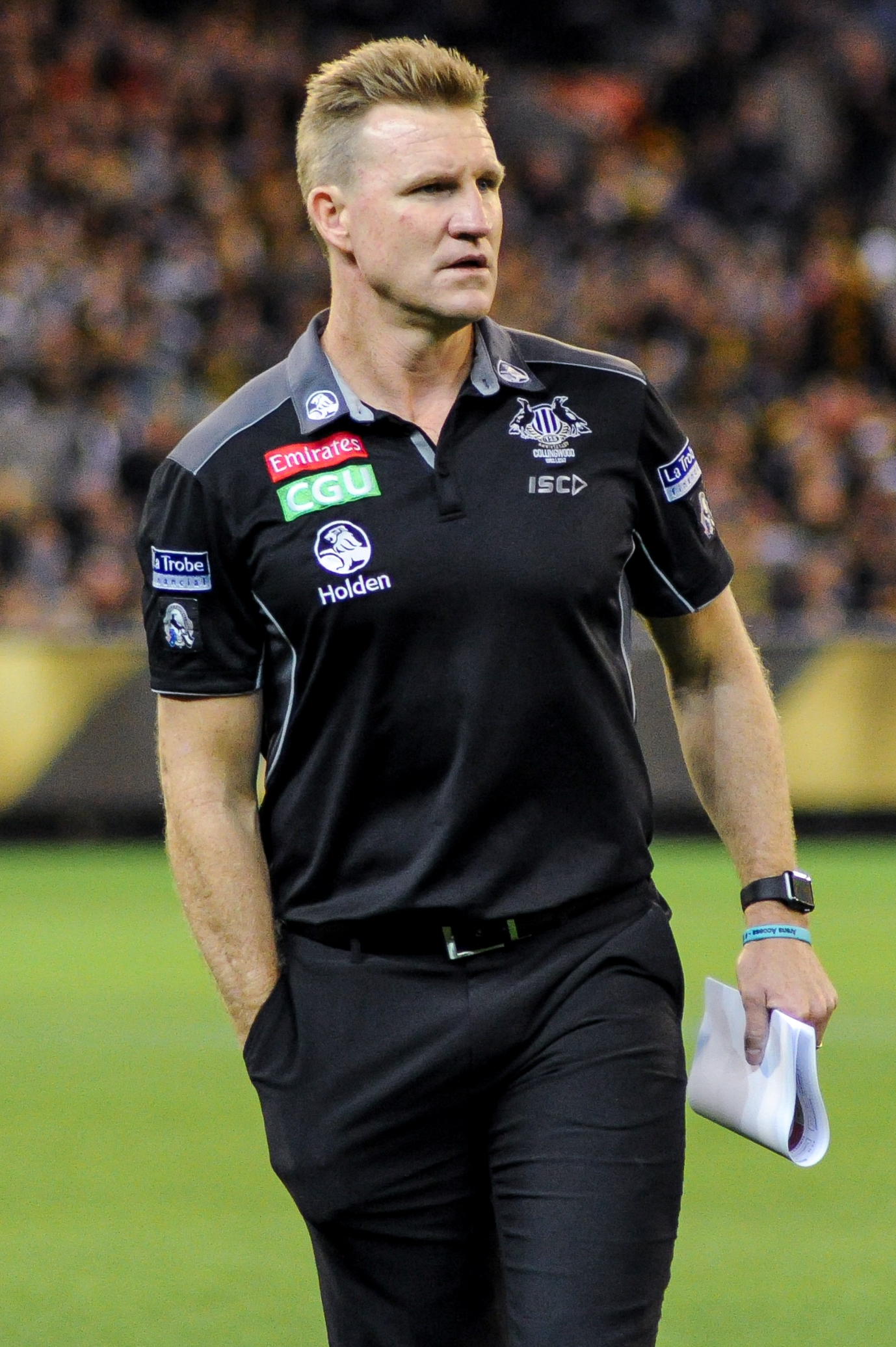
Nathan Buckley caused controversy when he rejected being zone-drafted by Brisbane, seeking instead to play with Collingwood.

Dare was replaced in 1991 by former Carlton premiership coach Robert Walls, who immediately set about rebuilding the playing list. Having inherited the oldest list in the league, by the end of the season he had the youngest. The Brisbane Bears won the wooden spoon again in 1991, but the same year also saw the Brisbane Bears win the reserves premiership against Melbourne. Walls insisted that the Bears not bend to the will of powerful Victorian clubs in recruitment matters, which was seen most notably in the case of the young Nathan Buckley – Buckley, who in 1992 won the SANFL's Magarey Medal and was a premiership winner with Port Adelaide, winning the Jack Oatey Medal for being Best on Ground in the SANFL Grand Final, was a zone recruit signed to the club on a one-year contract in 1993, which stipulated that he would be released to the club of his choice if he so desired at the completion of the contract; he was cleared to Collingwood as he had requested, in exchange for premiership centre-half forward Craig Starcevich, goalsneak Troy Lehmann and an early draft pick which the Bears used to recruit future star Chris Scott.

Off-field, Pelerman was losing millions of dollars annually on the club. At one point in 1991, Pelerman told Bears coach Robert Walls that he was closing the club down.

As part of the club's proposed move to The Gabba, Pelerman agreed to release the Bears from private ownership and revert to a traditional club structure in which the club's members were able to elect the board.

=== Move to The Gabba, rebranding and new membership structure ===
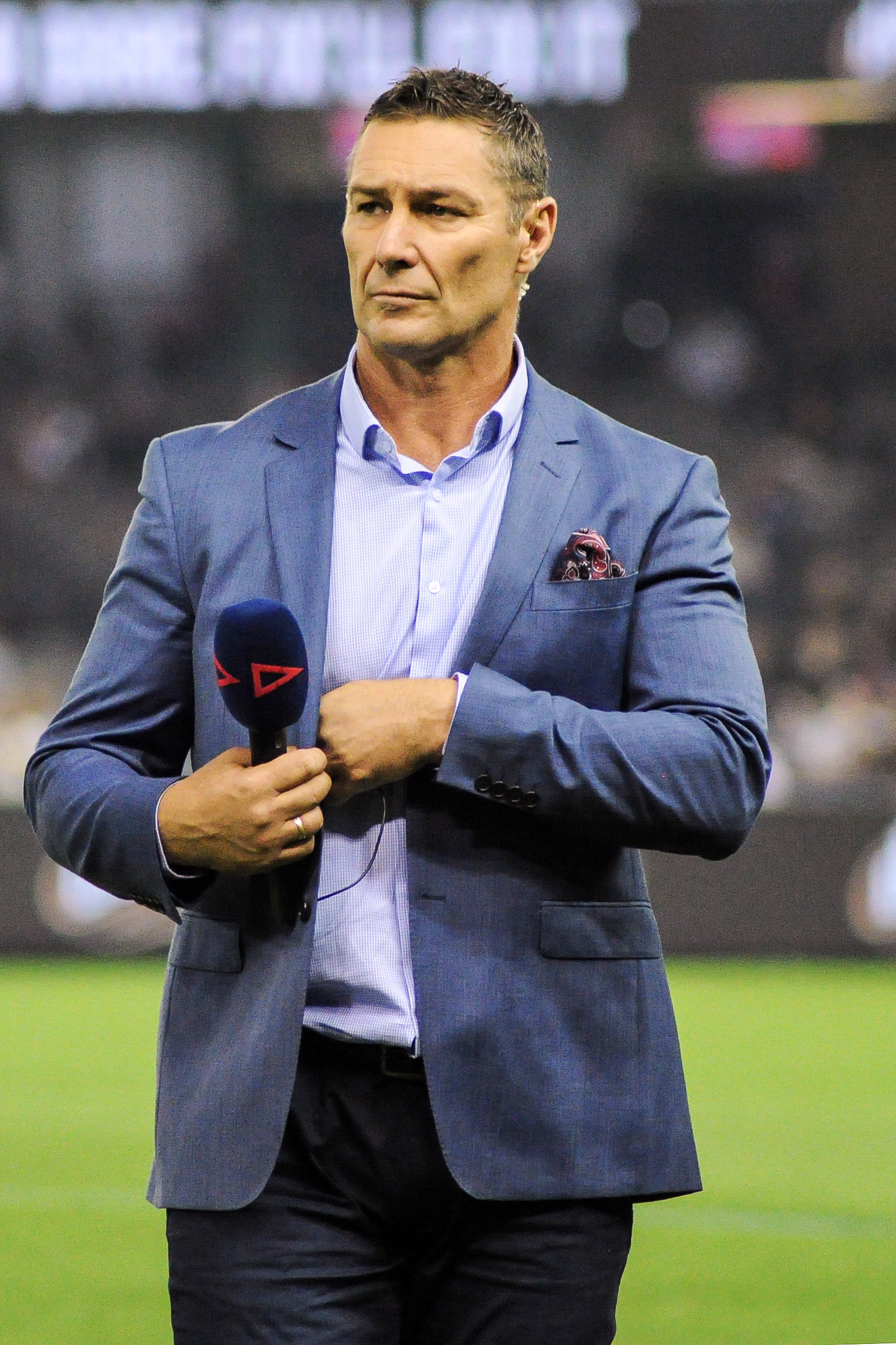
The recruitment of former Fitzroy full-back turned spearhead Alastair Lynch saw him became a poster boy for the new-look Bears. However, chronic fatigue saw him largely sidelined until 1996.

In 1992, the club changed its guernsey to a predominantly maroon strip with a gold V and white trim. More significantly, the Bears experimented with playing matches at The Gabba in Brisbane in 1991, before permanently moving all home matches to the venue ahead of the 1993 season. With the club now playing in its home city, membership and attendances instantly tripled. The dog racing track around the ground was removed, the surface was upgraded and the stands gradually replaced over the next few years with a view to converting the tired old ground to a state-of-the-art sporting facility.

In 1994, the Bears changed the club logo and the club song, and also began to show signs of a competitive side and were contenders for a finals berth before falling away in the last five games of the season. Then, in 1995, the club reached the finals after an extraordinary late-season recovery. After Round 15, the Bears were third-last on the ladder with four wins, and Robert Walls had announced his resignation as coach halfway through the season, but committed himself to seeing out the year. In round 16, the Bears trailed Hawthorn by 45 points at three-quarter time, but mounted an astounding final-quarter comeback to win the match by 7 points; at the time it was the largest final quarter comeback in league history. Brisbane then won five of its six remaining matches in the home-and-away season, including against Richmond and Essendon who were both in the top four, to just reach the finals for the first time, albeit with a win–loss record of only 10–12. The team was eliminated, but not disgraced, after losing its first ever final to eventual premiers Carlton by 13 points.

=== Northey era ===
Under the coaching of former Richmond premiership player John Northey, Brisbane had an excellent 1996 season, finishing third behind Sydney and North Melbourne. They made a good account of themselves in the finals, with two wins at The Gabba and a loss in the Preliminary Final to eventual premiers North Melbourne. Michael Voss also became the only Brisbane Bears player to win the Brownlow Medal, sharing the honour with Essendon's James Hird.

=== Club absorb Fitzroy's AFL operations, become Brisbane Lions ===
However, the club was still struggling off-field. Brisbane came close to folding prior to its move to Brisbane and the AFL began preparing a contingency for the club's demise in the event that the move failed. The Bears made a bid in 1990 to take over a financially struggling Fitzroy but was voted down by Fitzroy's board. The AFL had offered the Bears $6 million to merge with Fitzroy. It offered Fitzroy a similar amount which could have enabled the club to pay off its debts and come out of administration. One of the Bears' biggest problems was its lack of support (both on and off the field) in Melbourne, the location of most of its away matches. Another problem was the imminent entry of Port Adelaide into the AFL in 1997. As a result, two teams were either required to merge, or one was to fold or exit the league to make way for Port Adelaide's entry in the 1997 season. In mid-1996, the struggling Fitzroy Football Club entered administration due to financial pressures and was seeking to merge its AFL operations with another club. When a merger with North Melbourne to form the North Fitzroy Kangaroos failed to win the support of the other AFL clubs, a deal was reached between the Fitzroy administrator and the Bears, whereby Brisbane Bears took over Fitzroy's AFL operations. Subsequently, in line with the Deed of Arrangement between Fitzroy and Brisbane, Brisbane Bears members voted to change the club's name to Brisbane Bears-Fitzroy Football Club, trading as Brisbane Lions, based at The Gabba, with a new song, emblem and jumper all based on Fitzroy's.

The Bears' last match was a preliminary final on Saturday 21 September 1996 at the Melbourne Cricket Ground against North Melbourne, coincidentally the same location and opponent as their first match in 1987. Brisbane lost by 38 points to North Melbourne, who went on to win the 1996 premiership. With that loss, the Bears era and its history ended after a short and mostly troubled existence, with ten seasons of competition and the third-place finish in 1996 as its best performance.

=== Legacy ===
Since the absorption of Fitzroy's AFL operations, examples of the Bears legacy at the Lions include: the wearing the acronym BBFFC on the back of the jumper (with the BB acknowledging the existence of the Brisbane Bears), the occasional wearing of retro Bears design guernsey during AFL heritage round (Round 18, 2004, and Round 16, 2006, for example), and an Indigenous version of their 1992 guernsey worn on three occasions in 2022, some of the club's medals, including the best and fairest: the Merrett–Murray Medal (jointly named after former Bears captain and games record holder Roger Merrett), the Michael Voss Oval at The Reserve, Springfield (named for homegrown Bears and Lions player Michael Voss), and the Marcus Ashcroft Medal (named for homegrown Bears and Lions player Marcus Ashcroft) for the QClash football match against the Gold Coast Suns.

== Club facts ==
=== Uniforms ===
1987–1988 (Home)	1987–1990 (Away/Clash)	1989–1991 (Home)	1991–1991 (Away/Clash)	1992–1992 (Pre Season)	1992–1996 (Home & Away)

=== Mascot ===
Although koalas are marsupials and not bears, the Bears' mascot was a koala. Their logo and uniform also originally featured a koala.

=== Colours ===
- Maroon Gold (1987–1988)
- Cerise Gold (1989–1991)
- Maroon , Gold White (1992–1996)

=== Club songs ===
The Brisbane Football Club had two club songs in its existence.

==== "Dare to Beat the Bear" (1987–1993) ====
The original theme song was an original tune. The song was played in full over the stadium's speakers after each win. The team would sing the first verse in the change room after each win.

(1st verse)
What do we sing when we run out to play?
Dare to beat the Bear
What do we sing when we're on our way?
Dare to beat the Bear
We're hot! (We're hot!)
We're mean! (We're mean!)
We're strong! (We're strong!)
We're a team! (We're a team!)
We're the very best team you've ever seen
We're the Brisbane Bears

(2nd verse)
What do we know before every game?
We're going out to win
How do we know that we'll read the play?
We won't let 'em in
We're hot! (We're hot!)
We're mean! (We're mean!)
We're strong! (We're strong!)
We're a team! (We're a team!)
We're the very best team you've ever seen
We're the Brisbane Bears

(1st bridge)
Our home is mighty Brisbane and we're playing for our state
The Bear will growl across the land
Our victories will be great (great)

(3rd verse)
What do we shout when we sense their fear?
Beware the mighty Bear!
What are the words that we love to hear?
Beware the mighty Bear!
We're tough! (We're tough!)
We're keen! (We're keen!)
We're good! (We're good!)
We're a team! (We're a team!)
We're the very best team you've ever seen
We're the Brisbane Bears

(2nd bridge)
Our home is here in Queensland and there is not a shade of doubt
Right around Australia, we're gonna knock 'em out!

(3rd verse – repeated)
What do we shout when we sense their fear?
Dare to beat the Bear!
What are the words that we love to hear?
Dare to beat the Bear!
We're tough! (We're tough!)
We're keen! (We're keen!)
We're good! (We're good!)
We're a team! (We're a team!)
We're the very best team you've ever seen
We're the Brisbane Bears

(Home run)
We're tough! (We're tough!)
We're keen! (We're keen!)
We're good! (We're good!)
We're a team! (We're a team!)
We're the very best team you've ever seen
We're the Brisbane Bears
We're the very best team you've ever seen
We're the Brisbane Bears

Beware the mighty Bears!

==== "Brisbane Bears Will Live Forever" (1994–1996) ====
The new theme song was played to the music of "The Battle Hymn of the Republic".

The team would sing the first verse and the chorus in the change room after each win. The song was played in full over the stadium's speakers after each win.

(1st Verse)
If you are a Queenslander,
Then sing along with me
We are the Bears on the road to victory
All for one and one for all
We'll answer to the call
We're the greatest team of all

(2nd verse)
We're the fearless Brisbane Bears,
From the mighty Northern state
Our pride and guts and character are gonna make us great
Sydney, Melbourne, Adelaide and Perth will know their fate
When the Bears run out and roar

(Chorus)
Brisbane Bears will live forever
We will always stick together
The Gabba is the place where people always come to see
The greatest team of all

(3rd verse)
The whistle blows, the ball is bounced,
The crowd all give a yell
And we will do our very best until the final bell
And when the game is over, we'll be closer to the flag
We're the greatest team of all

(Chorus)
Brisbane Bears will live forever
We will always stick together
The Gabba is the place where people always come to see
The greatest team of all

(Home run)
The Gabba is the place where people always come to see
The greatest team of all

=== Membership ===
Year	Members	Finishing Position	Average Home Crowd
1987	3,449	13th/14	8,965
1988	7,607	13th/14	12,781
1989	7,176	10th/14	10,944
1990	5,630	14th/14	8,887
1991	5,696	15th/15	8,011
1992	5,401	14th/15	6,499
1993	5,750	13th/15	11,148
1994	6,158	12th/15	12,433
1995	6,893	Qualifying Final (8th/16)	10,305
1996	10,267	Preliminary Final (3rd/16)	18,088

=== Premierships ===
- Under 19s – None (Never competed in the VFL/AFL Under 19s)
- Reserves – 1991 (Only competed in the VFL/AFL Reserves from 1989 to 1992)
- Seniors – None (Only competed in the VFL/AFL Seniors from 1987 to 1996)

=== Wooden spoons ===
- 1990
- 1991

=== Individual awards ===
- Darryl White – Goal of the Year (1992)
- Nathan Buckley – AFL Rising Star (1993)
- Chris Scott – AFL Rising Star (1994)
- Michael Voss – Brownlow Medal (1996), All-Australian (1996)
- Craig Lambert – All-Australian (1996)

=== Club records ===
- Total Matches Played: 222 (72 wins, 2 draws, 148 losses)
- Highest Score: 33.21 (219) vs Sydney, Round 8, 1993
- Lowest Score: 2.5 (17) vs Hawthorn, Round 12, 1988
- Greatest Winning Margin: 162 points vs Sydney, Round 8, 1993
- Greatest losing margin: 164 points vs Geelong, Round 7, 1992
- Longest Winning Streak: 7 (Round 15 to Round 21, 1996)
- Longest Losing Streak: 12 (Round 20 1990 to Round 10, 1991)
- Most Goals in a Season: 60 by Roger Merrett in 1993 (18 games)
- Most Goals for the Club: 285 by Roger Merrett (1988–96 – 164 games)
- Most Games for the Club: 164 by Roger Merrett (1988–96)
- Most Years as Coach: 5 by Robert Walls (1991–95)
- Most Years as Captain: 7 by Roger Merrett (1990–96)
- Highest Ladder Position at end of season: Third in 1996
- Record Attendance: 66,719 vs North Melbourne, Preliminary Final 1996
- Record Attendance at The Gabba: 21,964 vs Essendon, Qualifying Final 1996
- Record Attendance at Carrara Oval: 18,198 vs Geelong, Round 15, 1989
- Brownlow Medalists: Michael Voss in 1996
- All-Australians Michael Voss and Craig Lambert in 1996

=== Sponsorship ===
Year	Major Sponsor	Shorts Sponsor	Bottom Sponsor
1989	Mitre 10	-	-
1990	-	-	-
1991	Foster's Lager	-	-
1992	Carlton & United Breweries	-	-
1993	Carlton & United Breweries	Southside Toyota	-
1994	Carlton & United Breweries	Jewel	Coca-Cola
1995	Carlton & United Breweries	Thrifty Car Rental	Coca-Cola
1996	Carlton & United Breweries	Southside Toyota	Coca-Cola

== Seasons ==
Premiers	Grand Finalist	Minor premiers	Finals appearance	Wooden spoon

=== Seniors ===
Year	Finish	W	L	D	Coach	Captain	Club Championship	Leading goalkicker	Goals	Ref
1987	13th	6	16	0	Peter Knights	Mark Mickan	Phil Walsh	Jim Edmond	34	
1988	13th	7	15	0	Peter Knights	Mark Mickan	Mark Withers	Warwick Capper	45	
1989	10th	8	14	0	Peter Knights; Paul Feltham	Mark Mickan	John Gastev	Brad Hardie	54	
1990	14th	4	18	0	Norm Dare	Roger Merrett	David Bain; Martin Leslie	Brad Hardie	37	
1991	14th	3	19	0	Robert Walls	Roger Merrett	Michael McLean	Laurence Schache	47	
1992	14th	4	17	1	Robert Walls	Roger Merrett	John Gastev	John Hutton	43	
1993	13th	4	16	0	Robert Walls	Roger Merrett	Martin Leslie	Roger Merrett	60	
1994	12th	9	13	0	Robert Walls	Roger Merrett	Craig Lambert	Roger Merrett	41	
1995	8th	10	12	0	Robert Walls	Roger Merrett	Michael Voss	Roger Merrett	44	
1996	3rd	15	6	1	John Northey	Roger Merrett	Michael Voss	Alastair Lynch	52	

=== Reserves ===
Year	Finish	W	L	D	Coach	Captain	Best and fairest	Leading goalkicker	Goals	Ref
1989	12th	3	16	1						
1990	8th	8	12	0	Rodney Eade					
1991	3rd	14	8	0	Rodney Eade	Rod Lester-Smith				
1992	11th	7	15	0						

== See also ==
- Notable players
- Wikipedia listing of Brisbane Bears players
