= West Melbourne Football Club (1918) =

Australian rules football club, active 1918–1940s

West Melbourne

Names
- Full name: West Melbourne Football Club

Club details
- Founded: 1918; 107 years ago
- Dissolved: 1940s

The West Melbourne Football Club (also known as West Melbourne Juniors) was an Australian rules football club that competed in junior competitions in Victoria from the late 1900s until the 1940s.

The club was founded in 1918, indirectly succeeding the original West Melbourne Football Club that disbanded in 1908.

== History ==
West Melbourne was an inaugural club in the Victorian Junior Football League in 1919, operating as an affiliate to Victorian Football League seniors club Essendon.

In 1920, West Melbourne faced multiple heavy losses, including a 197-point loss against Carlton District and a 229-point loss against St Kilda District. The club left the VJFL at the end of the season.

After leaving the VJFL, West Melbourne moved to the Victorian Football Association Sub-Districts, competing at different points in both the A Grade and B Grade. The club had far more success, winning at least eight premierships, including seven by the end of 1933. Records show the club also competed in the Catholic Young Men's Society Football Association (CYMSFA) in 1930.

Former Footscray and Williamstown player Jack McDonagh joined West Melbourne as captain-coach in 1941. The club won the VFL Sub-Districts grand final the same year, defeating South Melbourne Districts by 13 points.

The club stopped competing after the 1942 season during World War II, and did not re-emerge after the end of the war.
