= AFL reserves =

Australian rules football competition

- Formerly: Victorian Junior Football League; VFL seconds/reserves
- Sport: Australian rules football
- Founded: 1919
- First season: 1919
- Folded: 1999
- Country: Australia
- Most titles: Geelong (13)
- Related competitions: AFL Seniors; AFL under-19s

The AFL reserve grade competition, commonly known simply as the AFL reserves, was an Australian rules football competition that operated as a second-tier competition to the Australian Football League (AFL) from 1919 until 1999.

Prior to 1990, it was known as the VFL reserve grade competition, VFL reserves or VFL seconds.

In its final season in 1999, the competition was made up of the reserves teams of all the senior AFL clubs that were based in Victoria, plus that of the Sydney Swans.

Since 2000, the Victorian Football League (VFL), formerly known as the Victorian Football Association (VFA), has operated as a hybrid second-tier senior competition and reserves competition for most of the AFL clubs.

== History ==
=== Formation ===
In 1919, a new football competition known as the Victorian Junior Football League (VJFL) was established – at this time, junior was the term used for open age football of a lower standard than senior football, rather than for under age football. The league was intended to bring a junior club affiliated with each of the Victorian Football League (VFL) senior clubs into a single competition, and to adopt the same district eligibility scheme which the VFL had introduced in 1916. Player permit rules allowed for automatic transfers between the junior and senior clubs until July, allowing the juniors to serve as second eighteens for the seniors. The junior and senior clubs shared a home ground, with the juniors playing home when the seniors played away.

For the inaugural season, four existing junior clubs – the Fitzroy Juniors, Collingwood District (also known as Collingwood Juniors) and Leopold (affiliated with South Melbourne) and Caulfield (affiliated with Melbourne) – initially crossed to the new league from the Metropolitan Amateur Association; West Melbourne was affiliated with Essendon; and new junior clubs were formed in Carlton, Richmond and St Kilda. University, which had left the VFL senior competition after 1914, also entered a stand-alone junior team in the competition.

Shortly before the season, Caulfield withdrew, and a second University team was quickly arranged to take its place for the 1919 season. The two University teams were known as University A and University B, later becoming the modern day 'University Blues' and 'University Blacks'. University B contested only the 1919 season, with a Melbourne Juniors team established for 1920; University A contested the 1919 and 1920 seasons, reaching the grand final both years before dropping out.

West Melbourne faced multiple heavy losses in 1920, including a 197-point loss against Carlton District and a 229-point loss against St Kilda District. The club left the competition at the end of the season, and were replaced by Essendon Juniors.

=== Name change ===
In 1925, the VJFL was renamed as the VFL seconds, later known more commonly as the VFL reserves. Following the change, the seconds clubs still operated as distinct stand-alone clubs at this time, rather than coming directly under the influence of their senior clubs. This changed over the following decades, with all of the seconds teams gradually being subsumed by their senior counterparts.

Melbourne won the 1931, 1932, 1933, 1934 and 1935 premierships - the only time in VFL/AFL history (seniors or reserves) that a club has won five grand finals in a row.

Local players were primarily recruited via the league's metropolitan and country zoning rules, and the clubs had full ability to develop its players through its Under-19s and reserves teams: the same basic structure was also used consistently in the other two elite leagues, the South Australian National Football League (SANFL) and the West Australian Football League (WAFL).

=== VSFL era ===
History was made in 1991, with the Brisbane Bears winning the reserves premiership − the first non-Victorian club to win a VFL/AFL premiership in any grade.

The Victorian State Football League was established at the end of 1991 to take over administration of football in Victoria from the Australian Football League, which was now becoming preoccupied with administration of the game nationally.

The VSFL ran the AFL reserves competition from 1992 until 1999, which was also referred as the VSFL in its first few years. At the end of 1994, the VSFL also took over administration of the Victorian Football Association (VFA) competition (which was renamed the Victorian Football League in 1996).

=== Amalgamation with the VFL ===
Following the 1999 season, the AFL reserves was merged into the Victorian Football League. Such a merger had first been proposed as early as 1980, and a formal attempt to enact the merger for the 1995 season was defeated after strong opposition from the clubs.

== Clubs ==
South Melbourne was relocated to Sydney at the end of the 1981 VFL season, after which the club continued to play in the VFL/AFL reserves as Sydney.

The Brisbane Bears competed for four years between 1989 and 1992, winning their only premiership at any grade in 1991. After their merger with Fitzroy at the end of 1996, the Brisbane Lions did not compete in the competition.

No teams from South Australia or Western Australia ever competed in the VFL/AFL reserves.

=== Final clubs ===
Club	Colours	Nickname	Home Ground	Former League	Est.	Years in AFLR	AFLR Premierships		Fate
Club	Colours	Nickname	Home Ground	Former League	Est.	Years in AFLR	Total	Years	Fate
Carlton (Carlton District)		Blues	Princes Park, Carlton North	MAFA	1863	1919-1999	8	1926, 1927, 1928, 1951, 1953, 1986, 1987, 1990	Moved to VFL in 2000
Collingwood (Collingwood District)		Magpies	Victoria Park, Abbotsford	MAFA	1892	1919-1999	7	1919, 1920, 1922, 1925, 1940, 1965, 1976	Moved to VFL in 2000
Essendon (Essendon Juniors)		Bombers	Essendon Cricket Ground, Essendon	VJFA	1872	1921-1999	8	1921, 1941, 1950, 1952, 1968, 1983, 1992, 1999	Moved to VFL in 2000
Geelong		Cats	Kardinia Park, South Geelong	VJFA	1895	1922-1999	13	1923, 1924, 1930, 1937, 1938, 1948, 1960, 1963, 1964, 1975, 1980, 1981, 1982	Moved to VFL in 2000
Hawthorn		Hawks	Waverley Park, Mulgrave	VJFA	1902	1925-1999	4	1958, 1959, 1972, 1985	Disbanded after 1999 season
Melbourne		Demons	Melbourne Cricket Ground, Richmond	–	1858	1920-1999	12	1931, 1932, 1933, 1934, 1935, 1939, 1949, 1956, 1969, 1970, 1984, 1993	Disbanded after 1999 season
North Melbourne (Kangaroos) (Note: North Melbourne was officially known as the Kangaroos Football Club in 1999.)		Kangaroos	Arden Street Oval, North Melbourne	–	1869	1925-1999	7	1947, 1957, 1967, 1978, 1979, 1995, 1996	Moved to VFL in 2000
Richmond		Tigers	Melbourne Cricket Ground, Richmond	VJFA	1885	1919-1999	10	1929, 1946, 1954, 1955, 1966, 1967, 1971, 1973, 1977, 1997	Moved to VFL in 2000
St Kilda (St Kilda District)		Saints	Moorabbin Oval, Moorabbin	–	1873	1919-1999	3	1942, 1943, 1961	Moved to VFL in 2000
Sydney (South Melbourne) (Note: South Melbourne relocated to Sydney in 1982 was renamed Sydney Swans in 1983.)	(1925-81)(1982-99)	Swans	Sydney Cricket Ground, Moore Park	–	1874	1925-1999	0	-	Moved to AFL Sydney as Redbacks in 2000
Western Bulldogs (Footscray) (Note: Footscray was renamed Western Bulldogs in 1997.)		Bulldogs	Whitten Oval, Footscray	–	1877	1925-1999	6	1936, 1945, 1962, 1988, 1994, 1998	Moved to VFL in 2000

=== Former clubs ===
Club	Colours	Nickname	Home Ground	Former League	Est.	Years in AFLR	AFLR Premierships		Fate
Club	Colours	Nickname	Home Ground	Former League	Est.	Years in AFLR	Total	Years	Fate
Brisbane	(1989-91)(1992)	Bears	Carrara Stadium, Carrara	–	1986	1989-1992	1	1991	Disbanded after 1992 season
Caulfield			Caulfield Park, Caulfield North	MAFA	1890s	N/A	0	-	Withdrew from league before beginning of 1919 season
Coburg		Lions	Coburg City Oval, Coburg	MDFA	1891	1921-1924	0	-	Moved to VSDFL in 1925
Fitzroy (Fitzroy Juniors)		Lions	Brunswick Street Oval, Fitzroy North	MAFA	1883	1919-1996	3	1944, 1974, 1989	Disbanded after 1996 season
Leopold		Leos	Warehouseman's Cricket Ground, St Kilda	VJFA	1898	1919-1924	0	-	Folded after 1925 season
University A		Blues	University of Melbourne Main Oval, Parkville	VFL	1859	1919-1920	0	-	Moved to MAFA as University Blues in 1921
University B		Blacks	University of Melbourne Main Oval, Parkville	VFL	1859	1919	0	-	Moved to MAFA as University Blacks in 1920
West Melbourne				–	1918	1919-1920	0	-	Moved to VSDFL in 1921

=== Uniforms ===
Brisbane	Carlton	Collingwood	Essendon	Fitzroy	Footscray
Geelong	Hawthorn	Leopold	Melbourne	North Melbourne	Richmond
St Kilda	South Melbourne	Sydney	University A	University B	West Melbourne

== Notable players ==
A number of notable players competed solely in the reserves competition.

Shane Warne, considered to be one of the greatest bowlers in the history of cricket, played a single game for St Kilda in 1988: he was erroneously listed in the Record as Trevor Warne, and played in the Under-19s for the remainder of the season. Former St Kilda number one ticket holder John Moran also played for the reserves side.

John Bourke, a Collingwood forward, infamously shoved an umpire and then attacked a fan among other incidents during a game in 1985, leading to a suspension of ten years plus 16 games, equivalent to 240 matches.

== Premiers ==
Geelong won the most reserves premierships, with a total of 13.

== See also ==
- List of VFL/AFL reserves records
