= 1991 AFL reserves season =

72nd season of the AFL reserve grade competition

- Date: 23 March – 28 September
- Teams: 13
- Premiers: Brisbane Bears; 1st premiership
- Minor premiers: Collingwood
- Wooden spooners: Sydney

The 1991 AFL reserves season was the 72nd season of the AFL reserve grade competition, the Australian rules football competition operating as the second-tier competition to the Australian Football League (AFL).

The premiership was won by the Brisbane Bears after they defeated Melbourne in the 1991 AFL reserves grand final, held as a curtain-raiser to the 1991 AFL Grand Final at Waverley Park on 28 September. This was the first time a non-Victorian club had won an AFL premiership in any grade, and the Bears' only premiership before the club merged with Fitzroy at the end of the 1996 season.

== Ladder ==
Pos	Team	Pld	W	L	D	PF	PA	PP	Pts	Qualification
1	Collingwood	22	17	5	0	2705	2027	133.45	60	Finals series
2	Melbourne	22	15	7	0	2923	2314	126.32	60	Finals series
3	Brisbane Bears (P)	22	14	8	0	2488	2366	105.16	56	Finals series
4	Geelong	22	13	9	0	2625	2183	120.25	52	Finals series
5	North Melbourne	22	13	9	0	2545	2346	108.48	52	Finals series
6	St Kilda	22	12	10	0	2347	2042	114.94	48	Finals series
7	Hawthorn	22	12	10	0	2394	2161	110.78	48	
8	Carlton	22	11	11	0	2284	2183	106.83	44	
9	Richmond	22	10	12	0	2293	2456	93.36	40	
10	Essendon	22	10	12	0	2025	2425	83.51	40	
11	Fitzroy	22	6	18	0	1984	2617	75.81	24	
12	Footscray	22	5	17	0	1859	2588	71.83	20	
13	Sydney	22	5	17	0	1972	2781	70.91	20	

Rules for classification: 1) points; 2) percentage; 3) number of points for.

== Finals series ==
=== Semi-finals ===
	Semi-finals
Saturday, 14 September	Collingwood 12.8 (80)	def. by	Brisbane Bears 17.14 (116)	Waverley Park
Saturday, 14 September	Melbourne 17.14 (116)	def.	St Kilda 11.8 (74)	Waverley Park

=== Preliminary final ===
	Preliminary final
Saturday, 21 September (11:10am)	Collingwood 19.11 (125)	def.	Melbourne 9.10 (64)	Waverley Park

=== Grand Final ===
1991 AFL reserves Grand Final
Saturday, 28 September	Melbourne	def. by	Brisbane Bears	Waverley Park (crowd: 75,000)
2.3 (15); 5.5 (35); 9.9 (63); 11.9 (75)	Q1; Q2; Q3; Final	2.4 (16); 3.7 (25); 8.8 (56); 16.13 (109)	Umpires: A. McKernan, M. Viney
