= 1999 AFL reserves season =

80th season of the AFL reserve grade competition

- Date: 25 March – 25 September
- Teams: 11
- Premiers: Essendon; 8th premiership
- Minor premiers: St Kilda
- Wooden spooners: Carlton

The 1999 AFL reserves season was the 80th and final season of the AFL reserve grade competition, the Australian rules football competition operating as the second-tier competition to the Australian Football League (AFL).

Essendon won their 8th reserves premiership, defeating St Kilda by 52 points in the grand final on 25 September.

Following the end of the season, the AFL reserves was disbanded and merged into the Victorian Football League (VFL).

== Ladder ==
Pos	Team	Pld	W	L	D	PF	PA	PP	Pts
1	St Kilda	20	15	5	0	1924	1466	131.2	60
2	Melbourne	20	14	6	0	1998	1690	118.2	56
3	Richmond	20	13	7	0	2041	1635	124.8	52
4	Collingwood	20	12	8	0	1879	1579	119.0	48
5	Western Bulldogs	20	11	9	0	1909	1835	104.0	44
6	Essendon (P)	20	10	10	0	1891	2080	90.9	40
7	Sydney	20	9	11	0	1982	2149	92.2	36
8	North Melbourne	20	7	13	0	1735	1962	88.4	28
9	Geelong	20	7	13	0	1801	2209	81.5	28
10	Hawthorn	20	6	14	0	1679	1868	89.9	24
11	Carlton	20	6	14	0	1648	2014	81.8	24

Rules for classification: 1) points; 2) percentage; 3) number of points for

== Finals series ==
=== Qualifying and Elimination Finals ===
	Qualifying Final
Saturday, 4 September (11:00 am)	St Kilda 15.12 (102)	def.	Melbourne 13.12 (90)	Melbourne Cricket Ground

	Elimination Finals
Friday, 3 September (4:00 pm)	Collingwood 14.14 (98)	def. by	Western Bulldogs 18.9 (117)	Melbourne Cricket Ground
Sunday, 5 September (11:00 am)	Richmond 8.9 (57)	def. by	Essendon 8.21 (69)	Melbourne Cricket Ground

=== Semi-finals ===
	Semi-finals
Saturday, 11 September (11:00 am)	Melbourne 12.11 (83)	def. by	Essendon 13.19 (97)	Punt Road Oval
Saturday, 11 September (2:00 pm)	St Kilda 17.18 (120)	def.	Western Bulldogs 11.12 (78)	Princes Park

=== Preliminary Final ===
	Preliminary Final
Saturday, 19 September (11:00 am)	Western Bulldogs 14.10 (94)	def. by	Essendon 15.16 (106)	Melbourne Cricket Ground

=== Grand final ===
	Grand final
Saturday, 25 September (11:00 am)	St Kilda 14.10 (76)	def. by	Essendon 20.13 (133)	Melbourne Cricket Ground

== Aftermath ==
From 1995 until 1999, the Victorian State Football League operated its two open-age competitions – the VFA/VFL and the Victorian AFL reserves competition – separately; however, its intention had always been to merge the two, and this took place at the end of the season, after the agreement of the AFL clubs. Under the administration's new name Football Victoria (later AFL Victoria), the two competitions were merged into a single competition still known as the Victorian Football League.

Under the new arrangement, three Victorian AFL clubs opted to end their reserves teams and enter into affiliations with existing VFL clubs:

- Hawthorn affiliated with Box Hill
- Western Bulldogs affiliated with Werribee and Williamstown
- Melbourne affiliated with Sandringham

Additionally, Sydney entered a partial affiliation with Port Melbourne, the club with which it had shared a zone when it was based in South Melbourne. No more than six of Sydney's reserves players played for Port Melbourne; the rest played for a dedicated Sydney reserves team in the Sydney AFL competition.
