= 1919 VJFL season =

1st season of the Victorian Junior Football League (VJFL)

- Date: 3 May – 11 October 1919
- Teams: 9
- Premiers: Collingwood District; 1st premiership
- Minor premiers: Collingwood District; 1st minor premiership

The 1919 VJFL season was the inaugural season of the Victorian Junior Football League (VJFL), the Australian rules football competition operating as the second-tier competition to the Victorian Football League (VFL).

Collingwood District won the first grand final, finishing the season undefeated.

== Background ==
The Victorian Junior Football League was established to bring a junior club affiliated with each of the VFL senior clubs into a single competition – at this time, junior was the term used for open age football of a lower standard than senior football, rather than for under age football. The league was intended to bring a junior club affiliated with each of the Victorian Football League (VFL) senior clubs into a single competition, and to adopt the same district eligibility scheme which the VFL had introduced in 1916. Player permit rules allowed for automatic transfers between the junior and senior clubs until July, allowing the juniors to serve as second eighteens for the seniors. The junior and senior clubs shared a home ground, with the juniors playing home when the seniors played away.

For the inaugural season, four existing junior clubs – the Fitzroy Juniors, Collingwood District (also known as Collingwood Juniors) and Leopold (affiliated with South Melbourne) and Caulfield (affiliated with Melbourne) – initially crossed to the new league from the Metropolitan Amateur Association; West Melbourne was affiliated with Essendon; and new junior clubs were formed in Carlton, Richmond and St Kilda. University, which had left the VFL senior competition after 1914, also entered a stand-alone junior team in the competition.

Shortly before the season, Caulfield withdrew, and a second University team was quickly arranged to take its place for the 1919 season. As was the case in the seniors, once the home-and-away season had finished, the VJFL premiers were determined by the specific format and conventions of the amended "Argus system".

== Pre-season ==
A number of practice matches were held before the start of the season, including against several Victorian Football Association clubs.

	Pre-season
Saturday, 5 April	Richmond 11.8 (74)	def.	Camberwell 3.6 (24)
Saturday, 12 April	Hawthorn	v	Richmond	St James Park
Saturday, 19 April	Richmond	v	Richmond (seniors)	Richmond City Reserve
Monday, 21 April	Ballarat Association 9.14 (68)	def. by	Carlton District 12.25 (97)	Eastern Oval
Saturday, 26 April	Prahran 6.10 (46)	def. by	Richmond 7.5 (47)	Toorak Park
Saturday, 26 April (3:30 pm)	Carlton	v	Carlton District

== Home-and-away season ==
=== Round 1 ===
	Round 1
Saturday, 3 May	Fitzroy Juniors 6.6 (42)	def. by	Carlton District 9.9 (63)	Fitzroy Cricket Ground
Saturday, 3 May	West Melbourne 7.9 (51)	def.	Richmond 4.8 (32)	East Melbourne Cricket Ground

=== Round 2 ===
	Round 2
Saturday, 10 May	Carlton District 10.6 (66)	def.	West Melbourne 5.14 (44)
Saturday, 10 May	Richmond 6.10 (46)	def. by	University A 14.15 (99)	Richmond Cricket Ground

=== Round 3 ===
	Round 3
Saturday, 17 May	Richmond 6.10 (46)	def. by	University B 15.11 (101)	Richmond Cricket Ground
	Bye; Carlton District

=== Round 4 ===
	Round 4
Saturday, 24 May	University A 8.8 (56)	def.	Carlton District 6.10 (46)	University Oval
Saturday, 24 May	Collingwood District 9.20 (74)	def.	Richmond 3.5 (23)	Victoria Park

=== Round 5 ===
	Round 5
Saturday, 31 May	University B 13.13 (91)	def.	Carlton District 4.4 (28)	University Oval
Saturday, 31 May	Fitzroy Juniors 6.10 (46)	def.	Richmond 1.10 (16)

=== Round 6 ===
	Round 6
Saturday, 7 June	Carlton District 6.9 (45)	def.	St Kilda District 4.12 (36)
Saturday, 7 June	Leopold 14.10 (94)	def.	Richmond 1.8 (14)	South Melbourne Cricket Ground

=== Round 7 ===
	Round 7
Saturday, 14 June	Collingwood District 11.25 (91)	def.	Carlton District 7.4 (46)	Victoria Park
Saturday, 14 June	Richmond 6.14 (50)	def.	St Kilda District 4.6 (30)	Richmond Cricket Ground

=== Round 8 ===
	Round 8
Saturday, 21 June	Carlton District 4.16 (40)	def. by	Leopold 6.15 (51)	Princes Park

=== Round 9 ===
	Round 9
Saturday, 28 June	Richmond 5.14 (55)	def. by	Carlton District 12.7 (79)	Richmond Cricket Ground

=== Round 10 ===
	Round 10
Saturday, 5 July	Carlton District	v	Fitzroy Juniors	Princes Park

=== Round 11 ===
	Round 11
Saturday, 12 July	Collingwood District	v	Leopold
Saturday, 12 July	St Kilda District	v	University B
Saturday, 12 July	Richmond 5.14 (55)	def. by	West Melbourne 12.7 (79)	Richmond Cricket Ground

=== Round 12 ===
	Round 12
Saturday, 19 July	Collingwood District 30.18 (198)	def.	St Kilda District 3.6 (24)
Saturday, 19 July	Carlton District 5.12 (42)	def. by	West Melbourne 6.12 (48)
Saturday, 19 July	University A 12.15 (87)	def.	Richmond 4.10 (34)	University Oval

=== Round 13 ===
	Round 13
Saturday, 26 July	University B 13.10 (88)	def.	Richmond 8.9 (57)	Melbourne Cricket Ground
Saturday, 26 July	Carlton District 5.10 (40)	def. by	University A 8.11 (59)	Princes Park

=== Round 14 ===
	Round 14
Saturday, 9 August	Carlton District 7.9 (51)	def.	University B 6.11 (47)	Princes Park

=== Round 15 ===
	Round 15
Saturday, 16 August	St Kilda District 7.10 (52)	def. by	Carlton District 8.9 (57)	Junction Oval
Saturday, 16 August	Fitzroy Juniors 11.18 (84)	def.	Richmond 3.6 (24)	Fitzroy Cricket Ground

=== Round 16 ===
	Round 16
Saturday, 23 August	Carlton District 3.5 (23)	def. by	Collingwood District 10.12 (72)	Princes Park
Saturday, 23 August	Richmond 4.14 (38)	def. by	Leopold 11.23 (89)	Richmond Cricket Ground

=== Round 17 ===
	Round 17
Saturday, 30 August	St Kilda District 10.11 (71)	def.	Richmond 8.11 (59)	St Kilda Cricket Ground
Saturday, 30 August	Leopold 7.13 (55)	def.	Carlton District 2.8 (20)	South Melbourne Cricket Ground
Saturday, 30 August	Collingwood District 31.16 (202)	def.	University B 4.1 (25)

=== Round 18 ===
	Round 18
Saturday, 6 September (1:00 pm)	Richmond 6.7 (43)	def. by	Carlton District 6.14 (50)	Richmond Cricket Ground

== Ladder ==
Pos	Team	Pld	W	L	D	Pts
1	Collingwood District (P)	16	16	0	0	64
2	University A	16				44
3	Leopold	16				40
4	University B	16				40
5	Fitzroy Juniors	16				36
6	Carlton District	16	8	8	0	32
7	West Melbourne	16				20
8	St Kilda District	16				8
9	Richmond	16	1	15	0	4

== Finals series ==
=== Week 1 ===
	Week 1
Saturday, 27 September	University A	def.	University B	Melbourne Cricket Ground
Saturday, 27 September	Collingwood District	def.	Leopold

=== Week 2 ===
	Week 2
Saturday, 4 October	Leopold	def.	Collingwood District
Under the amended "Argus system", Collingwood District had the right to challenge as the minor premier.

=== Grand Final ===
	Grand final
Saturday, 11 October	Collingwood District 6.11 (47)	def.	University A 4.8 (32)	Melbourne Cricket Ground
