= Collingwood District Football Club =

Australian rules football club (1906–1938)

Collingwood District

Names
- Full name: Collingwood District Football Club
- Nickname(s): Districts, Magpies, Woodmen

Club details
- Founded: May 1906; 119 years ago
- Dissolved: Late 1938; 88 years ago (amalgamated with Collingwood)
- Competition: MJFA (1906–1915); VJFA (1918); VFL seconds (1919–1938)
- Premierships: VJFL/VFL seconds (4): 1919; 1920; 1922; 1925; MAFA (1): 1915
- Ground: Victoria Park

Uniforms
Home

The Collingwood District Football Club, nicknamed the Districts and sometimes known as the Collingwood Juniors, was an Australian rules football club based in the Melbourne suburb of Collingwood.

The club acted as a reserves team for the Collingwood Football Club until it was absorbed by Collingwood in 1938.

== History ==
The club was founded in May 1906 as a successor to the Collingwood Juniors Football Club competing in the Metropolitan Junior Football Association (MJFA, later MAFA).

In 1912, like other MJFA clubs developing formal affiliations, Collingwood District developed an association with the Collingwood Football Club, which competed in the Victorian Football League (VFL). As Collingwood was a seniors side, the Districts operated as its juniors team.

The club finished as runners-up in 1913 and 1914, before winning their first flag in 1915. The competition was put on hold because of World War I, but the Districts resumed playing in 1918 in the Victorian Junior Football Association (VJFA).

In 1919, the Victorian Football League introduced a reserves competition, known as the Victorian Junior Football League (VJFL) as it was contested by affiliated junior teams like Collingwood District.

The club won back-to-back premierships in 1919 and 1920, both times against University A.

Although by the late 1920s the Districts were Collingwood's official reserves side, it remained a standalone club. Some Collingwood District players opted not to play for the seniors, even if it meant missing out on playing in finals with the seconds. Some Collingwood officials were also concerned with rising costs.

At the end of the 1938 season, Collingwood took control over the Districts, officially making them the Collingwood reserves.

== Match records ==
- Highest score: 1919 – Collingwood District 31.16 (202) v University B 4. 1 (25)
- Biggest winning margin: 177 points; 1919 – Collingwood District 31.16 (202) v University B 4. 1 (25)

=== Records set by players ===
- Most matches: Bill Fitzgerald – 120
- Most goals: Bill Eade – 130
- Most goals kicked in a match: Ern Utting – 15 goals (1919)
