= Geelong Football Club =

Australian rules football club

Names
- Full name: Geelong Football Club Limited
- Nickname: Cats
- Former nickname(s): Pivotonians, Seagulls

2026 season
- After finals: 5th
- Home-and-away season: 5th
- Leading goalkicker: Shannon Neale (52 goals)

Club details
- Founded: 18 July 1859; 167 years ago
- Colours: Navy blue, white
- Competition: AFL: Senior men AFLW: Senior women (national level); VFL: Reserves men VFLW: Senior women (state level)
- President: Grant McCabe
- CEO: Steve Hocking
- Coach: AFL: Chris Scott; AFLW: Mick Stinear; VFL: Mark Corrigan; VFLW: Taylah Hassett
- Captain(s): AFL: Patrick Dangerfield; AFLW: Nina Morrison & Rebecca Webster; VFL: Dan Capiron; VFLW: Mel Staunton
- Premierships: VFL/AFL (10): 1925; 1931; 1937; 1951; 1952; 1963; 2007; 2009; 2011; 2022; VFA (7): 1878; 1879; 1880; 1882; 1883; 1884; 1886; Reserves/VFL (16): 1923; 1924; 1930, 1937; 1938; 1948; 1960; 1963; 1964; 1975; 1980; 1981; 1982; 2002; 2007; 2012
- Grounds: GMHBA Stadium (Note: Used for most of the club's home matches in the AFL. Since 2025, Geelong have played 10 home matches a year there.) (capacity: 40,000)
- Melbourne Cricket Ground (Note: Used for remaining home matches in the AFL, and for AFL finals matches. Since 2025, Geelong have played 1 home match a year there.) (capacity: 100,024)
- Former ground: Corio Oval (1878-1940)
- Training ground: Deakin University Elite Sports Precinct; GMHBA Stadium

Uniforms
Home	Away

Other information
- Official website: www.geelongcats.com.au

The Geelong Football Club, nicknamed the Cats, is a professional Australian rules football club based in Geelong, Victoria, Australia. The club competes in the Australian Football League (AFL), the sport's premier competition. The club formed on 13 April 1859, making it the second-oldest AFL side after Melbourne and one of the oldest football clubs in the world.

In the 1860s, Geelong participated in a series of Challenge Cup competitions, and was a foundation member of both the Victorian Football Association (VFA) in 1877 and the Victorian Football League (VFL) in 1897, now the national AFL. The club won the Western District Challenge Cup in 1875, a then-record seven VFA premierships between 1878 and 1886, and six VFL premierships by 1963, after which it experienced a 44-year wait time until it won its next premiership, a grand final record 119-point victory in 2007. Geelong won a further three premierships in 2009, 2011 and 2022. The Cats have fierce competitive rivalries with Hawthorn and Collingwood.

Geelong play most of their home games at Kardinia Park in South Geelong (nicknamed the Cattery and known for sponsorship reasons as GMHBA Stadium) and play the remainder at the Melbourne Cricket Ground. Geelong's traditional guernsey colours are white with navy blue hoops. The club's nickname was first used in 1923 after a run of losses prompted a local cartoonist to suggest that the club needed a black cat to bring it good luck. The club's official team song and anthem is "We Are Geelong".

Geelong fields a reserves men's team in the Victorian Football League (VFL), a senior women's team in the AFL Women's (AFLW) and a reserves women's team in the VFL Women's (VFLW) competitions.

== History ==
Chart of yearly ladder positions for Geelong in VFL/AFL

The club was founded in 1859 in the city of Geelong, Australia, and is the second oldest AFL club. It is believed to be the fourth oldest football club in Australia and one of the oldest in the world and among the most successful. Initially playing under its own rules, some of which, notably, were permanently introduced into Australian Football, it adopted the Laws of Australian Football in the early 1860s after a series of compromises with the Melbourne Football Club.

Geelong went on to play for most of its existence in the premier competitions, the first competition, the Caledonian Society Cup, a foundation club of both the Victorian Football Association (VFA) in 1877 and the Victorian Football League (VFL) in 1897. The Cats have been the VFL/AFL premiers ten times, with four in the AFL era (since 1990) in 2007, 2009, 2011, and 2022, to be the third most successful club over that stretch behind Brisbane and Hawthorn. They have also won ten McClelland Trophies, the most of any AFL/VFL club.

Many of the club's official records before 1920 have disappeared.

== Club identity and culture ==
=== Guernseys ===
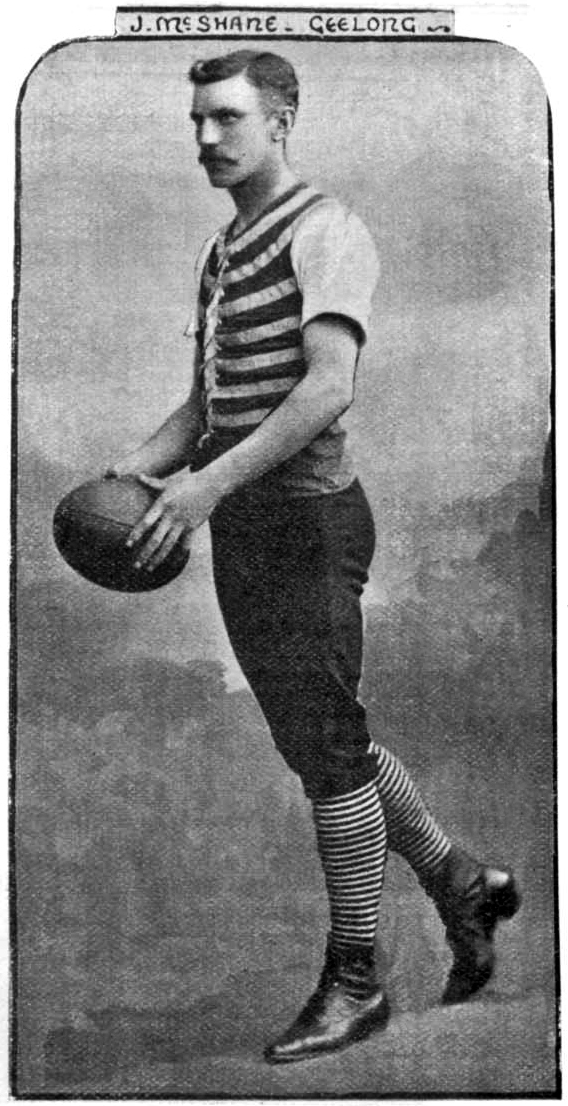
Club attire in 1895 (Jim McShane pictured)

Geelong's traditional navy blue and white hooped guernsey has been worn since the club's inception in the mid-1800s. The design is said to represent the white seagulls and blue water of Corio Bay.

The team has worn various away guernseys since 1998, all featuring the club's logo and traditional colours.

=== Nickname ===
Geelong has been nicknamed the Cats since 1923. Following a disappointing start to the season, the Melbourne Herald's sporting cartoonist, Samuel Garnet Wells, suggested that adopting a black cat as a mascot might bring the club good luck. A local entrepreneur seized on the idea, producing and selling badges featuring a black cat at games. Shortly afterward, Geelong won four consecutive games, cementing the cat in club folklore.

In earlier years, Geelong was often referred to as the Pivotonians, a name derived from the city's nickname, the Pivot. They were also called the Seagulls, in reference to Geelong's seaside location.

=== Songs ===
Geelong's official club song, "We Are Geelong", is set to the tune of "Toreador" from Carmen, with lyrics written by former premiership player John Watts. For many years, only the first verse was performed at matches and following victories, but since the start of the 2025 season, the club has played both verses. The version used by the club was recorded by the Fable Singers in 1972. The lyrics are as follows:

We are Geelong, the greatest team of all
We are Geelong; we're always on the ball
We play the game as it should be played
At home or far away
Our banners fly high, from dawn to dark
Down at Kardinia Park.

So! Stand up and fight, remember our tradition
Stand up and fight, it's always our ambition
Throughout the game to fight with all our might
Because we're the mighty blue and white
And when the ball is bounced, to the final bell
Stand up and fight like hell!

In the 1980s and 1990s, Geelong experimented with alternative club songs, starting with Barry Crocker's "C'mon the Cats!" and followed by "Cat Attack", which the team ran out to during the 1992 Grand Final. However, these received an indifferent response from fans at the time, and the club returned to its traditional anthem. In 2022, the club revived "Cat Attack" for Retro Round and has continued to play it following victories at Kardinia Park.

== Stadium and training facilities ==
Geelong's administrative headquarters is its home stadium, GMHBA Stadium, or also called Kardinia Park. The club trains here during the season. However, it also trains at its alternate training venue, the Deakin University Elite Sports Precinct. The latter features an MCG-sized oval and is often used by the club in the pre-season, when Kardinia Park is being used for other events.

== Rivalries ==
=== Hawthorn ===
The rivalry between Hawthorn and Geelong is defined by two Grand Finals: those of 1989 and 2008. In the 1989 Grand Final, Geelong played the man, resulting in major injuries for several Hawks players, including Mark Yeates knocking out Dermott Brereton at the opening bounce. Hawthorn controlled the game, leading by approximately 40 points for most of the match. In the last quarter, Geelong almost managed to come from behind to win, but fell short by six points. In the 2008 Grand Final, Geelong was the heavily backed favourite and had lost only one match for the season, but lost by 26 points; Geelong then won its next eleven matches against Hawthorn over the following five years, under a curse, which was dubbed the "Kennett curse" that was attributed to disrespectful comments made by Hawthorn president Jeff Kennett following the 2008 Grand Final. It was later revealed that after the 2008 grand final, Paul Chapman initiated a pact between other Geelong players to never lose to Hawthorn again. The curse was broken in a preliminary final in 2013, after Paul Chapman played his last match for Geelong the previous week. Hawthorn went on to win the next three premierships. In 2016, Geelong again defeated Hawthorn in the qualifying final. In twenty matches among the two sides between 2008 and 2017, twelve were decided by less than ten points, with Geelong emerging victorious in eleven of those twelve matches.

=== Collingwood ===
In 1925, Geelong won their first flag over Collingwood. In 1930, Collingwood defeated Geelong in the grand final making it four flags in-a-row for the Pies. Geelong later denied Collingwood three successive premierships in 1937, winning a famous grand final by 32 points.

The two sides played against each other in six finals between 1951 and 1955, including the 1952 Grand Final when Geelong easily beat Collingwood by 46 points. In 1953, Collingwood ended Geelong's record 23-game winning streak in the home and away season, and later defeated them by 12 points in the grand final, denying the Cats a third successive premiership.

Since 2007, the clubs have again both been at the top of the ladder and have met regularly in finals. Geelong won a memorable preliminary final by five points on their way to their first flag in 44 years. In 2008, Collingwood inflicted Geelong's only home-and-away loss, by a massive 86 points, but the teams did not meet in the finals. They met in preliminary finals in 2009 and 2010, each winning one en route to a premiership. They finally met again in a Grand Final in 2011, which Geelong won by 38 points; Geelong inflicted Collingwood's only three losses for the 2011 season.

=== Brisbane ===
In the 2020s, Geelong and Brisbane have played each other in five finals (2020 Preliminary final, 2022 Preliminary Final, 2024 Preliminary final, 2025 2nd Qualifying Final and 2025 Grand Final). The current record in this time frame stands at 3 wins for Geelong and Brisbane with 2 wins. This includes Brisbane's second most recent premiership in 2025, when they defeated Geelong by 47 points in what was a dominant second half of play in front of a crowd of 100,022 at the Melbourne Cricket Ground.

== Corporate ==
=== Sponsorship ===
At 100 years as of 2025, Geelong's sponsorship with the Ford Motor Company is one of the longest active sports sponsorship of any sports team in the world, with continuous sponsorship dating back to 1925. The sponsorship had previously been ratified as the longest in the world by the Guinness World Records, until a change in definitions.

In recent years, Geelong-based retail company Cotton On Group has become synonymous with the club. The company has manufactured on-field and other team merchandise since 2016.

==== AFL ====
Year	Kit Manufacturer	Major Sponsor	Shorts Sponsor	Bottom Back Sponsor	Top Back Sponsor
1925–1992	—	Ford (Note: Logo first appeared on Geelong guernseys during the 1970s)	—	—	—
1993	—	Ford	Ford	—	—
1994–1996	—	Ford	Ford	Ford	—
1997–1998	Adidas	Ford	Ford	Ford	—
1999–2002	Fila	Ford	Ford	Ford	—
2003–2006	Slazenger	Ford	Ford	Ford	—
2007	Slazenger	Ford	nib	Ford	—
2008–2016	ISC	Ford	nib	Ford	—
2017–2021	Cotton On	Ford	GMHBA	Ford	—
2022–2023	Cotton On	Ford	GMHBA	Ford	Ford
2024–2025	Cotton On	Ford	Simonds	Ford	Ford
2026–present	Cotton On	Ford	JD Sports	Simonds	Ford

==== AFL Women's ====
Year	Kit Manufacturer	Major Sponsor	Shorts Sponsor	Bottom Back Sponsor	Top Back Sponsor
2019-21	Cotton On	Ford	Viva Energy	Deakin University	—
2022 (S6)	Cotton On	Ford	Geelong Dairy	Deakin University	—
2022 (S7)–2023	Cotton On	Ford	Geelong Dairy	Deakin University	Bulla Dairy Foods
2024–present	Cotton On	Ford	Viva Energy	Deakin University	Bulla Dairy Foods

=== Supporter base ===
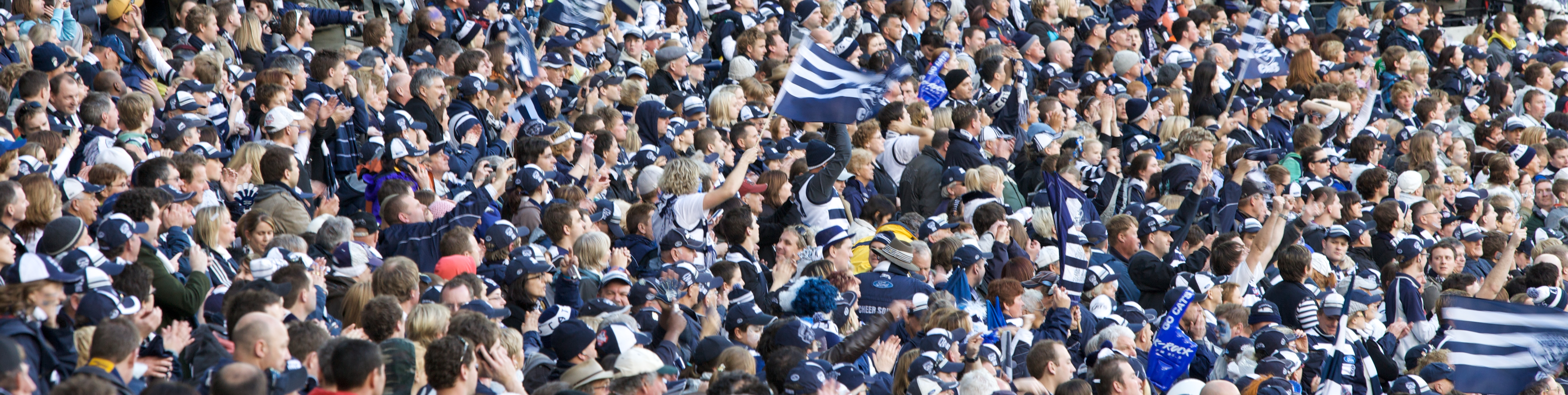
Geelong's supporters came out in force in the 2009 Grand Final against St Kilda

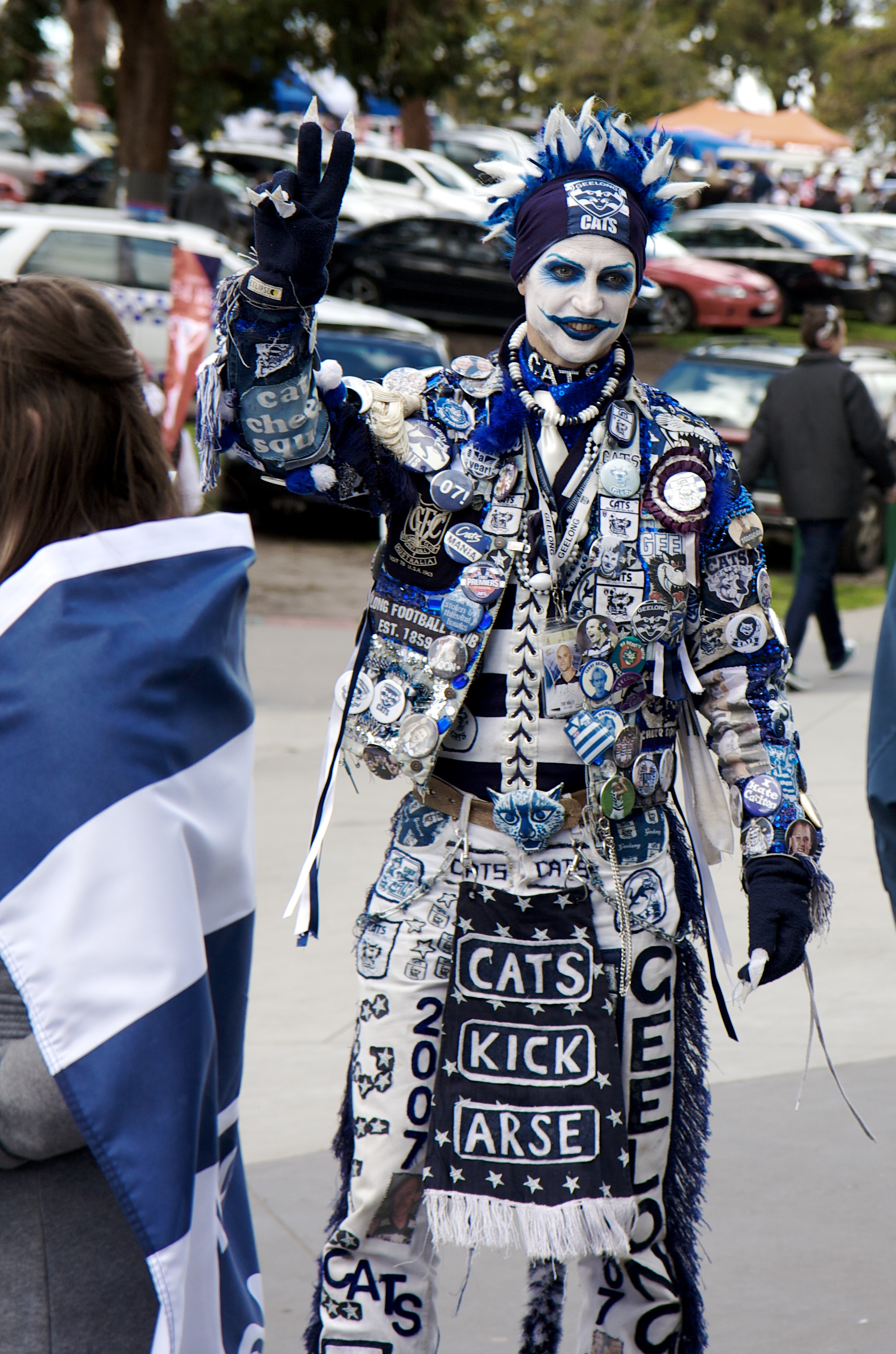
Well-known supporter Troy West, nicknamed "Catman"

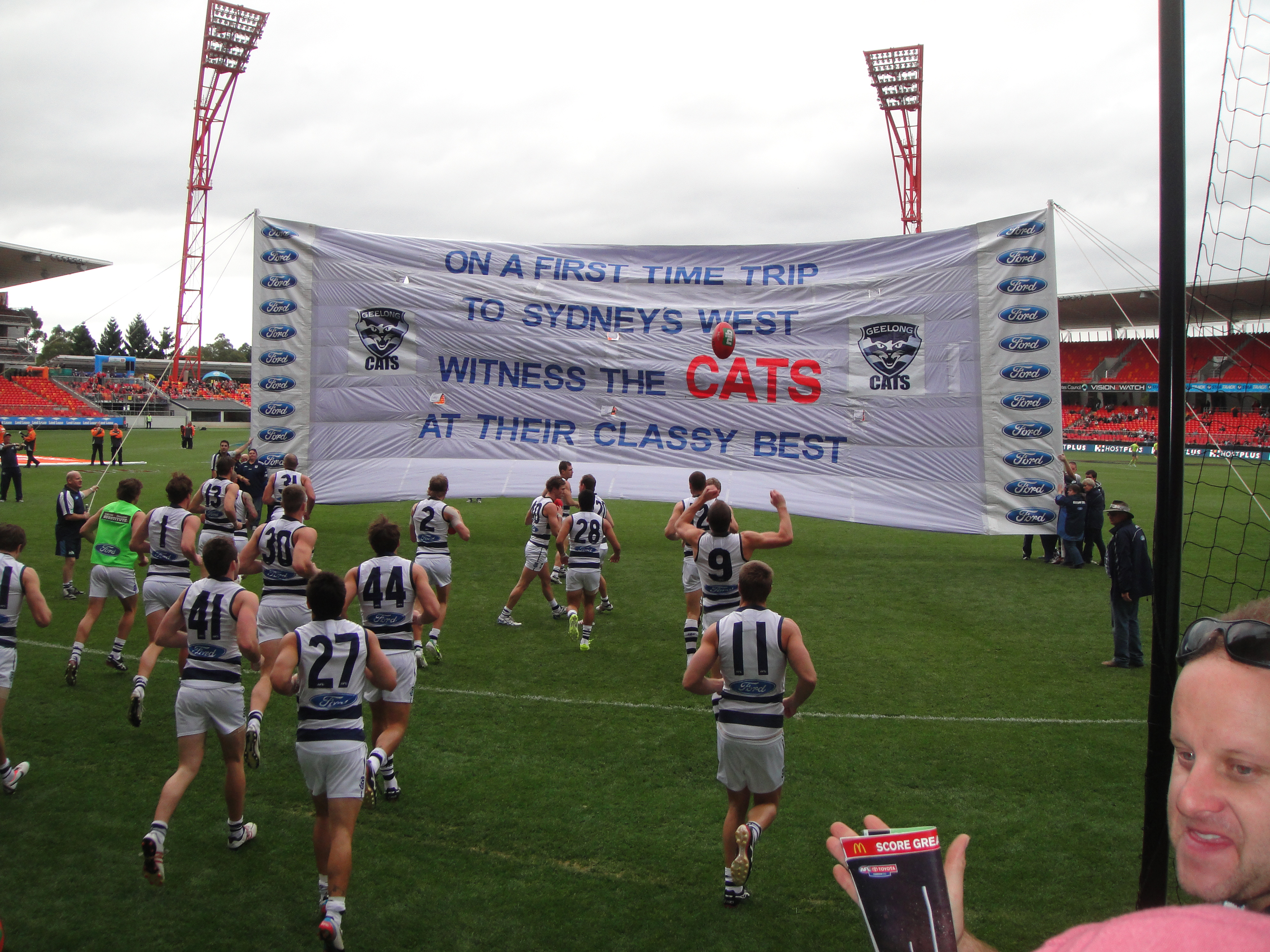
Geelong players prepare to break a banner, which is created by its supporters, before a match against Greater Western Sydney in June 2013.

Table of club membership, with home attendance figures (since 1984)
Season	Members	Average home attendance	Ref
1984	7,709	20,577	
1985	7,718	19,463	
1986	6,985	15,319	
1987	6,981	20,462	
1988	9,667	20,790	
1989	7,760	29,296	
1990	15,087	24,711	
1991	11,356	23,525	
1992	13,535	27,698	
1993	15,500	26,920	
1994	14,312	26,461	
1995	15,922	25,317	
1996	17,346	25,161	
1997	18,858	28,324	
1998	19,971	28,371	
1999	21,032	24,840	
2000	25,595	27,729	
2001	25,420	27,093	
2002	23,756	27,040	
2003	24,017	25,971	
2004	25,021	25,747	
2005	30,821	27,783	
2006	32,290	27,428	
2007	30,169	31,547	
2008	36,850	29,474	
2009	37,160	30,069	
2010	40,326	39,129	
2011	39,343	35,401	
2012	40,200	31,508	
2013	42,884	36,650	
2014	43,803	33,915	
2015	44,312	29,582	
2016	50,571	30,497	
2017	54,854	35,111	
2018	63,818	34,207	
2019	65,063	33,405	
2020	60,066	4,569	
2021	70,293	14,262	
2022	71,943	26,875	
2023	82,155	31,271	
2024	90,798	38,861	
2025	92,379	35,439	
2026	94,006	32,218	

== Players and staff ==
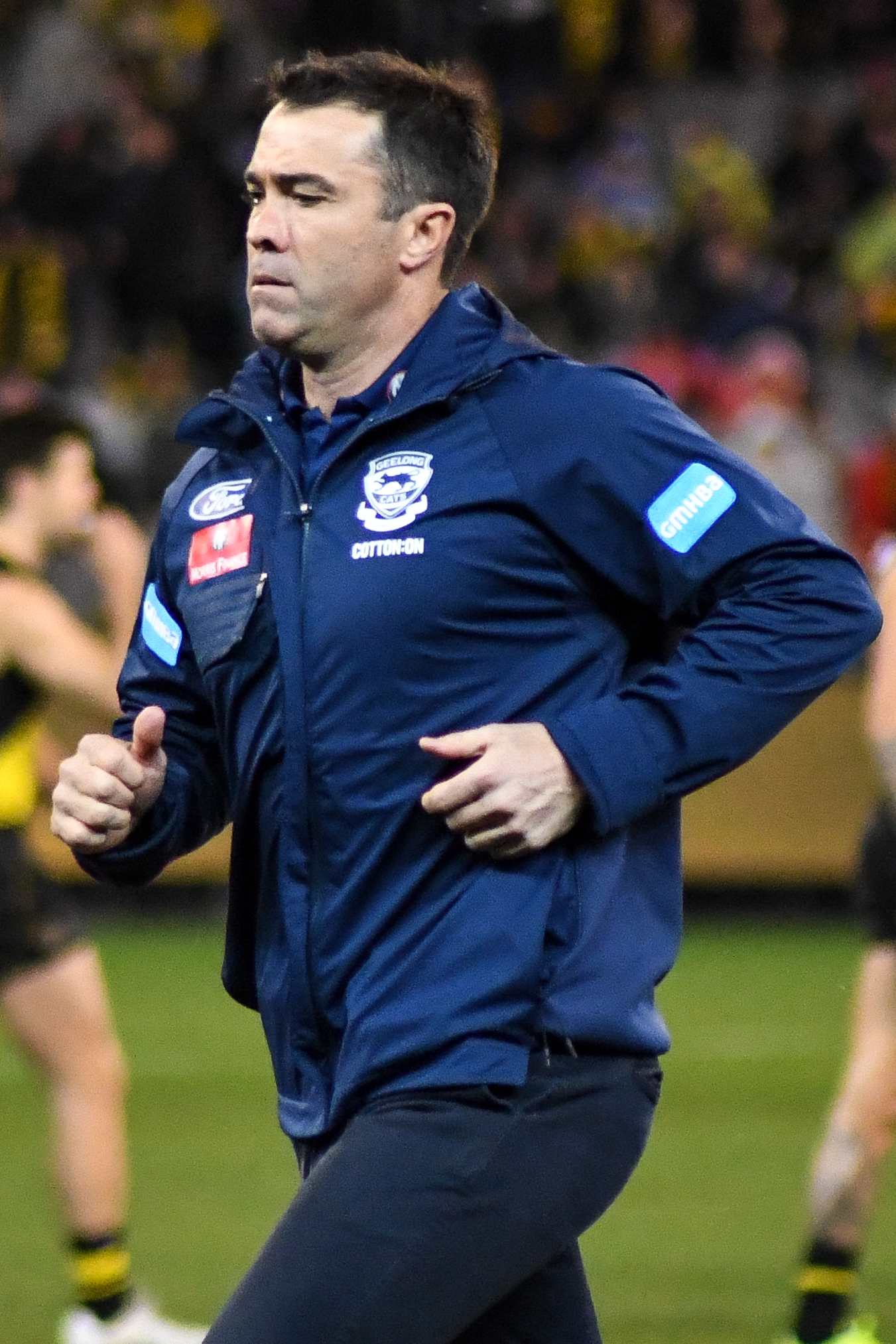
Chris Scott is the club's current head coach.

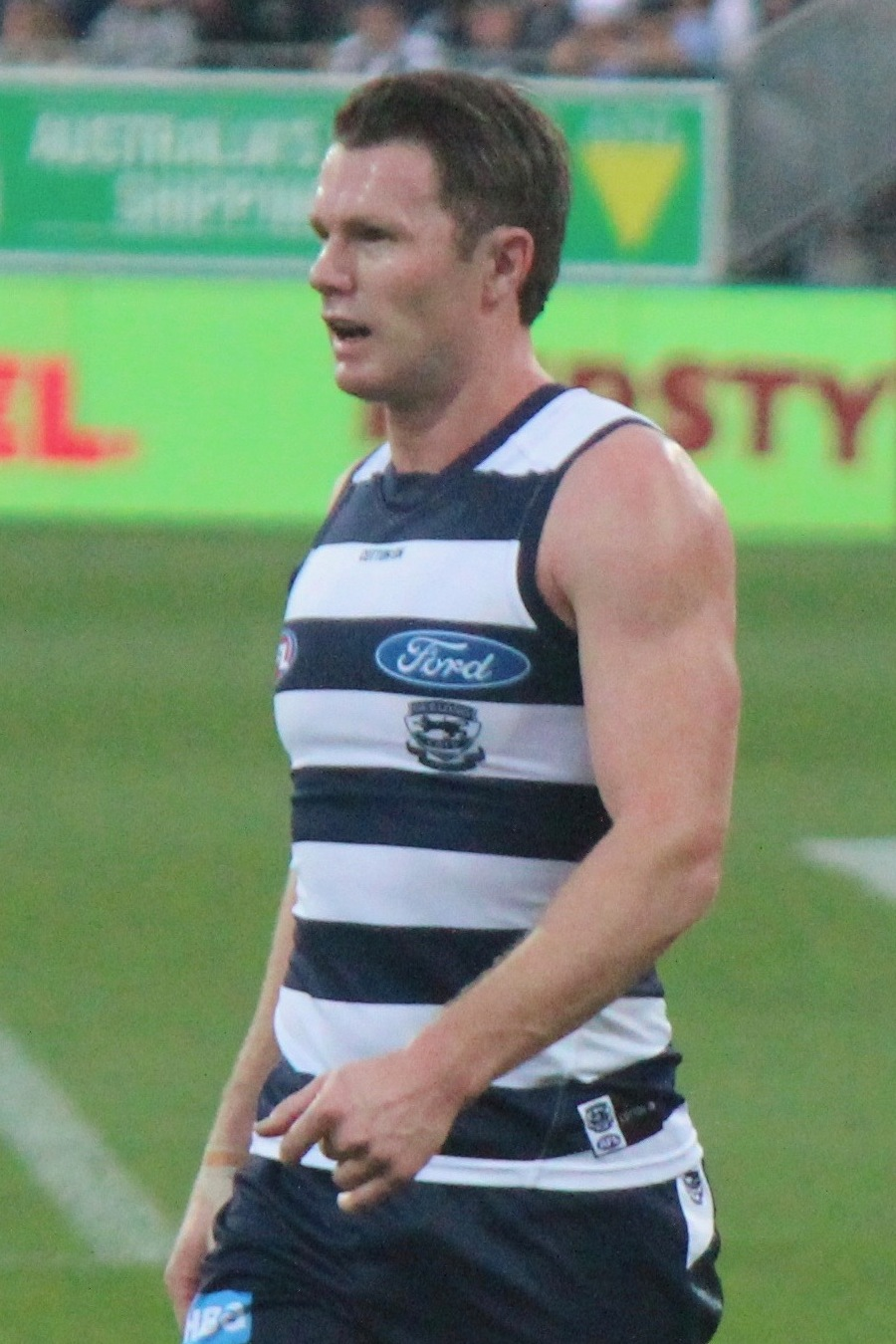
Patrick Dangerfield is the club's current captain.

=== Current playing list and coaches ===
Geelong Football Club · AFL personnel
Playing list		Inactive list	Coaching staff
1 Toby Greene; 2 Jay Polkinghorne; 3 Bailey Smith; 4 Tanner Bruhn; 5 Jeremy Cameron; 6 Toby Conway; 7 Shaun Mannagh; 8 Jordan Ridley; 9 Max Holmes; 11 Mitchell Edwards; 12 Rowan Marshall; 13 Jhye Clark; 14 Connor O'Sullivan; 16 Sam De Koning; 17 Lawson Humphries; 19 Jack Martin; 20 Jacob Molier; 21 Oliver Wiltshire; 22 Hunter Holmes; 23 Lennox Hofmann; 25 Jesse Mellor (B)	26 Harley Barker; 27 Nick Driscoll (A); 28 Ollie Dempsey; 29 James Worpel; 30 Tom Atkins; 32 Gryan Miers; 33 Shannon Neale; 34 Oisín Mullin; 35 Patrick Dangerfield (c); 36 Oliver Henry; 37 Joe Pike (A); 38 Jack Henry; 39 Zach Guthrie; 41 Cillian Burke (B); 42 Mark O'Connor; 44 Tom Stewart (vc); 45 Brad Close; 46 Mark Blicavs; Lachie Hicks; Anthony Long; Zach Stevens		Senior coach: Chris Scott; Assistant coaches: James Kelly (assistant); Nathan Buckley (assistant); James Rahilly (assistant); Corey Enright (assistant); Legend: (c) captain; (vc) vice-captain; (A) Category A rookie; (B) Category B rookie; Updated: 22 November 2026; Sources: Players (rookies); coaches

=== Officials ===
- President: Grant McCabe
- Vice President: Lyndsay Sharp
- Chief Executive Officer: Steve Hocking

== Club records ==
=== Premierships and awards ===
Premierships
Competition	Level	Wins	Years won
Australian Football League	Seniors	10	1925, 1931, 1937, 1951, 1952, 1963, 2007, 2009, 2011, 2022
Australian Football League	Reserves (1919–1999)	13	1923, 1924, 1930, 1937, 1938, 1948, 1960, 1963, 1964, 1975, 1980, 1981, 1982
Australian Football League	Under-19s (1946–1991)	1	1962
Victorian Football League	Seniors (1877–1896)	7	1878, 1879, 1880, 1882, 1883, 1884, 1886
Victorian Football League	Reserves (2000–present)	3	2002, 2007, 2012
Other titles and honours
McClelland Trophy	Seniors	11	1952, 1954, 1962, 1963, 1980, 1981, 1992, 2007, 2008, 2019, 2022
Challenge Cup	Seniors	1	1863–64
VFL Night Series	Seniors	1	1961
AFL pre-season competition	Seniors	2	2006, 2009
Finishing positions
Australian Football League	Minor premiership	15	1897, 1901, 1925, 1931, 1937, 1951, 1952, 1953, 1954, 1980, 1992, 2007, 2008, 2019, 2022
Australian Football League	Grand Finalist	10	1930, 1953, 1967, 1989, 1992, 1994, 1995, 2008, 2020, 2025
Australian Football League	Wooden spoons	5	1908, 1915, 1944, 1957, 1958
Victorian Football League (Since 2000)	Minor premiership	3	2002, 2013, 2026
Victorian Football League (Since 2000)	Grand Finalist	3	2006, 2013, 2026
Victorian Football League (Since 2000)	Wooden spoon	1	2005
VFL Women's	Grand Finalist	2	2018, 2021 (Note: After qualifying for the 2021 VFLW Grand Final, the match was postponed and later cancelled due to the COVID-19 pandemic in Victoria.)
VFL Women's	Wooden spoon	1	2024

=== Win–loss record ===
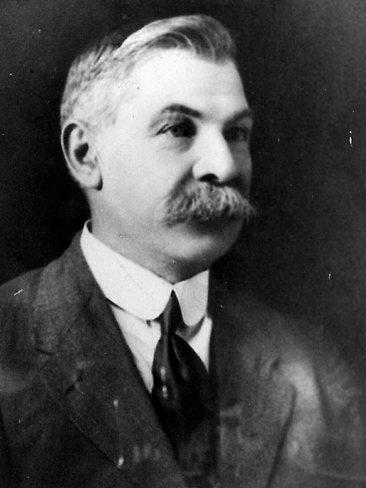
Awarded to the "best and fairest" player during the AFL's home-and-away season, the Brownlow Medal, football's most prestigious award, is named after Geelong player and administrator Charles "Chas" Brownlow.

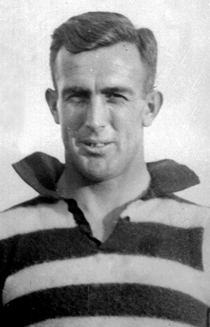
Geelong footballer Edward "Carji" Greeves, winner of the inaugural Brownlow Medal in 1924, and namesake of the Carji Greeves Medal, awarded to Geelong's best and fairest player of the season

Statistics are correct to end of the 2026 season

Geelong's win–loss record against other VFL/AFL clubs
Club	T	W	L	D	Win%	
Club	Adelaide	54	32	22	0	59.3
Brisbane Bears	15	10	4	1	70.0	
Brisbane Lions	49	27	22	0	55.1	
Carlton	229	105	122	2	46.3	
Collingwood	245	108	136	1	44.3	
Essendon	227	107	115	5	48.3	
Fitzroy	183	103	79	1	56.6	
Fremantle	49	31	18	0	63.3	
Gold Coast	19	14	5	0	73.7	
Greater Western Sydney	19	9	9	1	50.0	
Hawthorn	175	97	77	1	55.7	
Melbourne	227	136	89	2	60.4	
North Melbourne	175	111	63	1	63.7	
Port Adelaide	46	30	15	1	66.3	
Richmond	206	111	92	3	54.6	
St Kilda	226	137	88	1	60.8	
Sydney	234	129	104	1	55.3	
University	14	8	6	0	57.1	
West Coast	61	33	27	1	54.9	
Western Bulldogs	171	110	59	2	64.9	
Totals	2624	1448	1152	24	55.6	

Key
W	Wins	L	Losses	D	Draws	T	Total
Win%	Winning percentage						

=== Match records ===
Table of club VFL/AFL match records
Club record	Round	Venue	Opponent	Details	Ref
Highest score	Round 7, 1992	Carrara	Brisbane Bears	Geelong 37.17 (239) v Brisbane Bears 11.9 (75)	
Lowest score	Round 3, 1899	Corio Oval	Fitzroy	Geelong 0.8 (8) v Fitzroy 4.8 (32)	
Highest losing score	Round 6, 1989	Princes Park	Hawthorn	Geelong 25.13 (163) v Hawthorn 26.15 (171)	
Lowest winning score	Round 9, 1897	Corio Oval	Melbourne	Geelong 1.9 (15) v Melbourne 0.10 (10)	
Biggest winning margin	Round 19, 2011	Kardinia Park	Melbourne	186 points Geelong 37.11 (233) v Melbourne 7.5 (47)	
Biggest losing margin	Round 21, 1986	Princes Park	Hawthorn	135 points – Geelong 13.12 (90) v Hawthorn 35.15 (225)	
Record attendance (home and away game)	Round 6, 2025	Melbourne Cricket Ground	Hawthorn	88,746	
Record attendance (finals matches, excluding Grand Finals)	1968 VFL season preliminary final	Melbourne Cricket Ground	Essendon	103,649	
Record attendance (finals match)	1967 VFL Grand Final	Melbourne Cricket Ground	Richmond	109,396	

== Reserves team ==
The Geelong reserves (also known as the Bendigo Bank Cats for sponsorship reasons) are the reserves side of the club, playing in the Victorian Football League.

=== History ===
Geelong's reserves side began competing in the Victorian Junior Football League, later known as the VFL/AFL reserves, in 1922. The team won thirteen premierships during that time (1923, 1924, 1930, 1937, 1938, 1948, 1960, 1963, 1964, 1975, 1980, 1981 and 1982), the most of any club.

Since the demise of the AFL reserves competition, the Geelong reserves have competed in the Victorian Football League. Unlike all other Victorian AFL clubs, Geelong has never operated in a reserves affiliation with an existing VFL club, having instead operated its stand-alone reserves team continuously. The team is composed of both reserves players from the club's primary and rookie AFL lists, and a separately maintained list of players only eligible for VFL matches. Home games are played at GMHBA Stadium, with some played as curtain-raisers to senior AFL matches.

The side is also known as the Bendigo Bank Cats, referring to the club's commercial partnership with Bendigo Bank.

=== Club honours ===
- Premierships (3): 2002, 2007, 2012
- Runners-ups (3): 2006, 2013, 2026
- Minor premierships (3): 2002, 2013, 2026
- Wooden spoons (1): 2005

== Women's teams ==
In 2017, following the inaugural AFL Women's (AFLW) season, Geelong was among eight clubs that applied for licences to enter the competition from 2019 onwards. In September 2017, the club was announced as one of two clubs, along with North Melbourne, to receive a licence to join the competition in 2019. The club has also had a team in the second-tier VFL Women's league since 2017.

The club has qualified for the AFL Women's finals on three occasions, making it through the preliminary final in 2023 before losing to eventual premiers Brisbane.

=== AFL Women's team ===
Geelong Football Club · AFL Women's personnel
Playing list		Inactive list	Coaching staff
1 Mikayla Bowen; 2 Nicola Stevens; 3 Amy McDonald; 4 Caitlin Tipping*; 5 Jackie Parry; 6 Julia Crockett-Grills; 8 Zali Friswell; 9 Nina Morrison (c); 10 Georgie Rankin; 11 Evie Cowcher; 12 Kate Kenny*; 13 Sienna Tallariti; 14 Chloe Scheer; 15 Priya Bowering; 16 Chantel Emonson	17 Jasmin Stewart; 18 Piper Dunlop; 19 Annie Lee; 20 Alissa Brook; 21 Rebecca Webster (c); 22 Rachel Kearns; 23 Bryde O'Rourke; 24 Chantal Mason; 25 Renee Morgan; 26 Claudia Gunjaca; 27 Emma Kilpatrick; 28 Emma Murray*; 30 Lexi Gregor; 41 Georgie Prespakis; 45 Aishling Moloney		Senior coach: Mick Stinear; Assistant coaches: Elise Coventry (assistant); Ryan Pendlebury (assistant); Sam Simpson (assistant); Legend: (c) captain; * rookie; Updated: 22 November 2026; Sources: Players, coaches

=== Match records ===
Table of club AFLW match records
Club record	Round	Venue	Opponent	Details	Ref
Highest score	Round 10, 2022 (S7)	Kardinia Park	Sydney	Geelong 15.12 (102) v Sydney 4.3 (27)	
Lowest score	Week 3, 2024	Princes Park	Carlton	Geelong 0.5 (5) v Carlton 4.5 (29)	
Highest losing score	Week 5, 2024	Kardinia Park	Hawthorn	Geelong 9.7 (61) v Hawthorn 12.7 (79)	
Lowest winning score	Round 1, 2022 (S7)	Kardinia Park	Richmond	Geelong 2.3 (15) v Richmond 1.5 (11)	
Biggest winning margin	Round 2, 2026	Kardinia Park	St Kilda	85 points – Geelong 16.4 (100) v Sydney 2.3 (15)	
Biggest losing margin	Round 1, 2026	Marvel Stadium	North Melbourne	73 points – Geelong 3.9 (27) v North Melbourne 15.10 (100)	
Record attendance (home and away game)	Round 1, 2019	Kardinia Park	Collingwood	18,429	
Record attendance (finals matches, excluding Grand Finals)	Preliminary final, 2019	Adelaide Oval	Adelaide	13,429	
Record attendance (finals match)	Preliminary final, 2019	Adelaide Oval	Adelaide	13,429	

=== Win–loss record ===
Statistics are correct to end of round 10 2026

Geelong's win–loss record against other AFL Women's clubs
Club	P	W	L	D	Win%	
Club	Adelaide	7	1	6	0	14.3
Brisbane	5	2	3	0	40.0	
Carlton	5	1	4	0	20.0	
Collingwood	6	2	4	0	33.3	
Essendon	5	4	1	0	80.0	
Fremantle	5	2	3	0	40.0	
Gold Coast	5	4	1	0	80.0	
Greater Western Sydney	5	2	3	0	40.0	
Hawthorn	4	2	2	0	50.0	
Melbourne	4	1	3	0	25.0	
North Melbourne	9	0	8	1	0.0	
Port Adelaide	2	2	0	0	100.0	
Richmond	8	6	2	0	75.0	
St Kilda	4	2	2	0	50.0	
Sydney	4	3	1	0	75.0	
West Coast	6	4	2	0	66.7	
Western Bulldogs	6	3	3	0	50.0	
Totals	90	41	48	1	45.6	

== Activism ==
=== Same-Sex Marriage ===
During the Australian Marriage Law Postal Survey, Geelong Football Club supported the Yes vote.

=== Voice to Parliament ===
Geelong Football Club was a supporter of the Voice to Parliament.

== See also ==
- Sport in Australia
- Sport in Victoria
- List of Geelong Football Club players, captains and coaches
- 1963 Miracle Match

== Footnotes ==
Bibliography

- Michael Lovett, ed. (2010). AFL Record Season Guide. Geoff Slattery Media Group. ISBN 978-0-9806274-5-9.
