= 2023 VAFA season =

122nd season of the Victorian Amateur Football Association

- Date: 15 April − 15 September 2023
- Teams: 63

The 2023 VAFA season was the 122nd season of the Victorian Amateur Football Association (VAFA), the largest senior community Australian rules football competition in Victoria. The season began on 15 April and concluded on 15 September, with 63 teams participating across seven divisions under a promotion and relegation system.

== Background ==
Accounting firm William Buck signed a three-year sponsorship deal extension with the VAFA on 24 April 2023, which included continuing the naming rights for the "William Buck Premier Division", continuing a partnership that began in the 2010s.

The VAFA signed a three-year agreement with KommunityTV, News Corp Australia's live-streaming platform, which saw the platform exclusively broadcast 48 matches throughout 2024. KommunityTV had broadcast 2022 finals matches as part of a trial arrangement.

== Association membership ==
Following the conclusion of the 2022 season, Manningham Cobras merged with Yarra Old Grammarians in order to keep both clubs viable on and off-field. On 19 September 2022, the formation of Old Yarra Cobras Football Club was announced.

In November 2022, the VAFA revealed Westbourne Grammarians Football Club would not field senior teams in 2023 (having meant to be relegated from Division 3) to Division 4), and would instead field a team in the Thirds competition. However, Westbourne announced on 31 March – around two weeks before the start of the season – that they would not field the thirds team, instead using 2023 to "regroup" as a club.

On 23 February 2023, Premier C club Old Mentonians announced that they would go into recess and not field any teams in 2023 because of a player shortage.

=== Name changes ===
Prahran/Assumption members voted on 30 November 2022 to revert to the club's traditional name of Prahran Football Club, which was reflected in the 2023 season.

Additionally, Emmaus St Leo's renamed to Wattle Park Amateurs Football Club due to "extenuating circumstances".

== Notable events ==
- During the round 8 match between La Trobe University and Elsternwick in Division 3 on 3 June, a 21-year-old La Trobe University accidentally slapped Elsternwick player Ashley Quinn (a Victoria Police officer) while marking the ball. Quinn grabbed the player and punched him multiple times to the face, breaking his nose and causing the match to be temporarily halted. Quinn fronted the Moorabbin Magistrates' Court in August 2024 on one charge of intentionally causing injury, and was sentenced to a six-month diversion.
- On 15 July, VAFA defeated Perth Football League 20.10 (130) to 17.9 (111) in extra time in a representative game, the first representative victory for the VAFA since 2018.
- On 2 September, during the Division 3 semi-final between Elsternwick and Hawthorn, a Hawthorn player was allegedly punched in the back of a head by a spectator, later identified as former Hawthorn AFL player Shem Tatpu. The player was taken to hospital while Tatpu was arrested by police, however he was later released from custody.
- On 3 August, the VAFA announced that 33 previously-unnamed perpetual awards and trophies would be renamed to honour people "who have given distinguished service" to the VAFA or its clubs.
- St John's was removed from the Division 3 reserves grand final after it was found that they had fielded an ineligible player in the preliminary final against Box Hill North, with Box Hill North taking its place in the grand final against North Brunswick.
- Former West Brunswick reserves captain-coach Ron "Banjo" Patterson, who played a senior premiership in 1960 and won the reserves best and fairest medal in 1969, died on 17 March 2023.
- Former Old Haileybury player Alan Ross, who was part of the club's inaugural senior premiership in 1963, died in May 2023.

== Premier ==
2023 Premier Division season
- Teams: 10
- Premiers: Collegians; 18th Premier premiership
- Minor premiers: Collegians
- JN Woodrow Medallist: Marty Gleeson (University Blues − 19 votes)
- Leading goalkicker: David Mirra (Collegians − 48 goals)

Collegians won their 18th Premier Division premiership, defeating St Kevin's by 85 points.

=== Ladder ===
Pos	Team	Pld	W	L	D	PF	PA	PP	Pts	Qualification
1	Collegians (P)	18	15	3	0	1707	945	180.6	60	Finals series
2	University Blues	18	13	5	0	1343	1149	116.9	52	Finals series
3	Old Scotch	18	12	6	0	1638	1053	155.6	48	Finals series
4	St Kevin's	18	12	6	0	1471	1084	135.7	48	Finals series
5	Old Brighton	18	9	9	0	1306	1221	107.0	36	
6	Old Xaverians	18	8	10	0	1347	1311	102.8	32	
7	University Blacks	18	8	10	0	1200	1352	88.8	32	
8	Old Melburnians	18	6	12	0	1222	1592	76.8	24	
9	Old Haileybury	18	6	12	0	1103	1468	75.1	24	Relegation
10	Caulfield Grammarians	18	1	17	0	848	2010	42.2	4	Relegation

Rules for classification: 1) points; 2) percentage; 3) number of points for.
(P) Premiers

=== Finals ===
Grand Final
Sunday, 24 September (2:30pm)	Collegians	def.	St Kevin's	Elsternwick Park
6.7 (43); 9.8 (62); 16.13 (109); 19.16 (130)	Q1; Q2; Q3; Final	1.0 (6); 5.4 (34); 5.6 (36); 6.9 (45)
5: Ferguson, Mirra; 2: Greene, Michie; 1: Ong, Watson, Walker, Bazzani, Pocknee	Goals	2: Kerr; 1: Tucker, Mansfield, Hodges, Kennedy
Ferguson, Mirra, Beilby, Cassidy, Hibbins, Michie	Best	Hodges, Critchley, Tucker, Richards

=== Team of the Year ===
2023 VAFA Premier Team of the Year
B:	Matt Warren (Collegians)	Marty Gleeson (University Blues)	Luke McCleary (Collegians)
HB:	Sam Sofronidis (Collegians)	Campbell Moorfield (University Blacks)	Brodie Steele (Old Haileybury)
C:	Jim Bazzani (Collegians)	Kenny Ong (Collegians)	Tom Cutler (University Blues)
HF:	Mitch Wallis (St Kevin's)	David Mirra (c) (Collegians)	Henry Brown (Old Scotch)
F:	Charlie MacIsaac (Old Xaverians)	James Tarrant (Old Scotch)	Will Pocknee (Collegians)
Foll:	Josh Steadman (University Blacks)	Ben Harding (Old Melburnians)	Luke Winter (St Kevin's)
Int:	Tom Fisher (Old Brighton)	Aidan Franetic (Old Scotch)	Marcus Stavrou (Old Xaverians)
Int:	Brodie Easton (Old Scotch)		
Coach:	Jared Rivers (Collegians)		

=== Club best and fairest ===
Club	Winner	Ref
Caulfield Grammarians	Matt Clarkson	
Collegians	Sam Sofronidis	
Old Brighton	Tom Fisher	
Old Haileybury	Durras Seccull	
Old Melburnians	Ben Harding	
Old Scotch	Aidan Franetic	
Old Xaverians	Marcus Stavrou	
St Kevin's	Cal Matheson	
St Kevin's	Luke Winter	
University Blacks	Lachlan Knight	
University Blues	Marty Gleeson	

=== Club leadership ===
Club	Coach	Leadership group			Ref
Club	Coach	Captain(s)	Vice-captain(s)	Other leader(s)	Ref
Caulfield Grammarians	Guy McKenna	Joey McClelland	Harry Schaffer (vc), Jack Ellwood (dvc), Jack Webster (dvc)	Oscar Roberts, Jasper Rouget, Will Vessely, Oscar Ursini	
Collegians	Jared Rivers	Sam Hibbins	Viv Michie, Corey Cassidy	David Mirra, Luke McCleary, Matt Warren, Jim Bazzani	
Old Brighton	Dan Donati	Harry Hill	Tom Fisher, Michael Karayannis, Hamish Dick, Tom Yorgey		
Old Haileybury		James Paul	Brede Seccull, Brodie Steele	Durrus Seccull, Jack Munro, Max Sinclair, Sam Loewe, Will Paul, Josh Gasparini	
Old Melburnians		Jackson Paine	Will Nichols	Lachie Haysman, Ben Haysman, Ed Smart, Dan Coffield, Ed Michelmore	
Old Scotch	Mark Gnatt				
Old Xaverians		Marcus Stavrou	Billy Gowers (vc), Denis Symeopoulos (dvc), Alex Trigar (dvc)		
St Kevin's	Anthony Lynch				
University Blacks		Campbell Moorfield, Josh Steadman		Lachlan Knight, Henry Bennett, Nick Hey	
University Blues		Ayce Cordy			

== Premier B ==
2023 Premier B season
- Teams: 10
- Premiers: St Bernard's; 5th Premier B premiership
- Minor premiers: St Bernard's
- GT Moore Medallist: Jack Sheridan (Old Geelong − 17 votes); Ben Huggard (St Bernard's − 17 votes)
- Leading goalkicker: Caleb Lewis (St Bedes/Mentone Tigers − 49 goals)

St Bernard's won their 5th Premier B premiership, defeating Fitzroy by 31 points in the grand final to complete a perfect season. Fitzroy was promoted to the highest grade the first time since the club entered the VAFA.

=== Ladder ===
Beaumaris were found to have fielded an ineligible player in their round 11 loss to St Bedes/Mentone Tigers and round 12 victory over St Bernard's. On 18 July, the VAFA announced Beaumaris would lose the four premiership points that was gained in their victory, along with their "points for" score from both games. Beaumaris appealed the decision, but it was upheld on 3 August.

As a result of gaining the four points that Beaumaris had lost, St Bernard's finished with a perfect season.

Pos	Team	Pld	W	WF	L	D	PF	PA	PP	Pts	Qualification
1	St Bernard's (P)	18	17	1	0	0	1925	905	212.7	72	Finals series
2	Fitzroy	18	12	0	6	0	1530	1184	129.2	48	Finals series
3	De La Salle	18	12	0	6	0	1358	1135	119.7	48	Finals series
4	Beaumaris	18	11	0	7	0	1553	1143	135.9	44	Finals series
5	Old Geelong	18	11	0	7	0	1473	1266	116.4	44	
6	St Bedes/Mentone Tigers	18	11	0	7	0	1485	1423	104.4	44	
7	Williamstown CYMS	18	7	0	11	0	1436	1594	90.1	28	
8	Old Trinity	18	6	0	12	0	1031	1354	76.1	24	
9	AJAX	18	1	0	17	0	1085	1852	58.6	4	Relegation
10	Monash Blues	18	1	0	17	0	954	2114	45.0	4	Relegation

Rules for classification: 1) points; 2) percentage; 3) number of points for.
(P) Premiers

=== Finals ===
	Grand Final
Saturday, 23 September (2:30pm)	St Bernard's 15.13 (103)	def.	Fitzroy 10.12 (72)	Elsternwick Park
Both teams promoted to Premier Division

=== Club best and fairest ===
Club	Winner	Ref
AJAX	Benji Krongold	
Beaumaris	Cal Heath	
De La Salle	Christian Algeri	
Fitzroy	Donovan Toohey	
Monash Blues	Daniel Easson	
Old Geelong	Harry Kol	
Old Trinity	Ollie Scott	
Old Trinity	Harry Thompson	
St Bedes/Mentone Tigers	Michael Barnes	
St Bedes/Mentone Tigers	Caleb Lewis	
St Bernard's	Jordan Farrell	
Williamstown CYMS	Jordan Busuttil	

== Premier C ==
2023 Premier C season
- Teams: 9
- Premiers: Old Camberwell
- Minor premiers: Old Ivanhoe
- L Zachariah Medallist: Billy Murphy (Old Ivanhoe − 27 votes)
- Leading goalkicker: Ryan Macdermid (Parkdale Vultures − 54 goals)

As a result of Old Mentonians withdrawing prior to the start of the season, Premier C only had nine teams, with each having two byes and playing 16 games. Additionally, only one team would be relegated to Division 1, instead of the usual two.

=== Ladder ===
Pos	Team	Pld	W	L	D	PF	PA	PP	Pts	Qualification
1	Old Camberwell	16	14	2	0	1257	921	136.5	56	Finals series
2	Old Ivanhoe (P)	16	11	4	1	1417	974	145.5	46	Finals series
3	PEGS	16	11	4	1	1174	971	120.9	46	Finals series
4	Parkdale Vultures	16	9	6	1	1256	1086	115.7	38	Finals series
5	Hampton Rovers	16	7	9	0	1144	1233	92.8	28	
6	Mazenod	16	7	9	0	1014	1097	92.4	28	
7	Old Carey	16	5	9	2	1054	1161	90.8	24	
8	Marcellin	16	3	13	0	925	1407	65.7	12	
9	Ormond	16	2	13	1	1035	1426	72.6	10	Relegation

Rules for classification: 1) points; 2) percentage; 3) number of points for.
(P) Premiers

=== Finals ===
	Grand Final
Saturday, 23 September (2:30pm)	Old Ivanhoe 14.20 (104)	def.	Old Camberwell 9.8 (62)	Trevor Barker Beach Oval
Both teams promoted to Premier B

=== Club best and fairest ===
Club	Winner	Ref
Hampton Rovers	Liam O'Driscoll	
Marcellin	Matthew Capetola	
Mazenod		
Old Camberwell	James Allen	
Old Carey	Tom Jepson	
Old Ivanhoe	Patrick Naish	
Ormond	Luke Kennedy	
Parkdale Vultures		
PEGS	Alex McLeod	

== Division 1 ==
2023 Division 1 season
- Teams: 10
- Premiers: Glen Eira
- Minor premiers: Glen Eira
- LS Pepper Medallist: Luke Ashen (Oakleigh − 22 votes); Rory Brodie (Prahran − 22 votes)
- Leading goalkicker: Aaron Cloke (Oakleigh − 83 goals)

On 7 June 2023, Preston Bullants parted wats with senior coach George Cotsonis, who was in his second season in the role. He was replaced by Tom Hill, a former Greater Western Sydney and Western Bulldogs-listed player.

Following the conclusion of the season, in which they finished last, Ivanhoe left the VAFA and transferred to the Northern Football Netball League for 2024.

Preston was ultimately not relegated for the 2024 season as part of the VAFA's aim to keep all divisions at 10 teams each.

=== Ladder ===
Pos	Team	Pld	W	L	D	PF	PA	PP	Pts	Qualification
1	Glen Eira (P)	18	16	2	0	1593	969	164.4	64	Finals series
2	Oakleigh	18	14	4	0	1650	1114	148.1	56	Finals series
3	Prahran	18	13	5	0	1642	1047	156.8	52	Finals series
4	UHS-VU	18	11	7	0	1311	1230	106.6	40	Finals series
5	Therry Penola	18	10	8	0	1289	1177	109.5	40	
6	Old Peninsula	18	9	9	0	1363	1431	95.3	36	
7	Kew	18	8	10	0	1209	1218	99.3	32	
8	West Brunswick	18	4	14	0	958	1527	62.7	16	
9	Preston Bullants	18	3	15	0	1203	1739	69.2	12	Relegation
10	Ivanhoe	18	2	16	0	886	1652	53.6	8	Relegation

Rules for classification: 1) points; 2) percentage; 3) number of points for.
(P) Premiers

=== Finals ===
	Grand Final
Saturday, 16 September (2:30pm)	Oakleigh 6.13 (49)	def. by	Glen Eira 15.13 (103)	Trevor Barker Beach Oval
Both teams promoted to Premier C

=== Club best and fairest ===
Club	Winner	Ref
Glen Eira	Lachlan Myers	
Ivanhoe		
Kew	Max Waters	
Oakleigh		
Old Peninsula	Jake Lovett	
Prahran	Rory Brodie	
Preston Bullants		
Therry Penola	Jackson Young	
UHS-VU	Finn Urie	
West Brunswick	Emlyn Nettleton	

== Division 2 ==
2023 Division 2 season
- Teams: 10
- Premiers: Parkside; 1st Division 2 premiership
- Minor premiers: Parkside
- J Fullerton Medallist: Daniel Wood (Whitefriars − 30 votes)
- Leading goalkicker: Daniel Wood (Whitefriars − 73 goals)

Parkside won their first-ever Division 2 premiership, and their first senior premiership since 1988, defeating Old Yarra Cobras (who were in their first VAFA season) by three points.

Following the conclusion of the season, in which they finished seventh, Old Paradians left the VAFA and transferred to the Northern Football Netball League for the 2024 season.

=== Ladder ===
Pos	Team	Pld	W	L	D	PF	PA	PP	Pts	Qualification
1	Parkside (P)	18	15	3	0	1589	958	165.9	60	Finals series
2	Brunswick	18	13	5	0	1476	1203	122.7	52	Finals series
3	Old Yarra Cobras	18	12	5	1	1572	1276	123.2	50	Finals series
4	South Melbourne Districts	18	12	6	0	1416	1151	123.0	48	Finals series
5	Whitefriars	18	12	6	0	1677	1416	118.4	48	
6	MHSOB	18	7	10	1	1341	1456	92.1	30	
7	Old Paradians	18	6	11	1	1227	1428	85.9	26	
8	Bulleen Templestowe	18	5	13	0	1041	1622	64.2	20	
9	St Mary's Salesian	18	4	13	1	1277	1625	78.6	18	Relegation
10	Aquinas	18	2	16	0	1213	1694	71.6	8	Relegation

Rules for classification: 1) points; 2) percentage; 3) number of points for.
(P) Premiers

=== Finals ===
	Grand Final
Sunday, 17 September (2:30pm)	Parkside 10.8 (68)	def.	Old Yarra Cobras 10.5 (65)	Coburg City Oval
Both teams promoted to Division 1

=== Club best and fairest ===
Club	Winner	Ref
Aquinas	Josh Glennie	
Brunswick	Angus Ross	
Bulleen Templestowe	Jack Anderson	
MHSOB	Julian Eimutis	
Old Paradians	Marcus Nolan	
Old Yarra Cobras	Nick Zappala	
St Mary's Salesian	Jack Elliston	
South Melbourne Districts	Jamie Brooker	
Parkside		
Whitefriars	Daniel Wood	

== Division 3 ==
2023 Division 3 season
- Teams: 8
- Premiers: Elsternwick
- Minor premiers: Elsternwick
- Hutchinson Medallist: Justin Raiti (Hawthorn − 26 votes)
- Leading goalkicker: Will Meehan (Hawthorn − 76 goals)

=== Ladder ===
Pos	Team	Pld	W	L	D	PF	PA	PP	Pts	Qualification
1	Elsternwick (P)	18	16	2	0	1936	1120	172.8	64	Finals series
2	Hawthorn	18	14	4	0	2234	1280	174.5	56	Finals series
3	Canterbury	18	14	4	0	1845	1142	161.6	56	Finals series
4	Wattle Park	18	11	7	0	1587	1324	119.9	44	Finals series
5	Richmond Central	18	7	11	0	1286	1581	82.4	28	
6	Power House	18	6	12	0	1382	1627	84.9	24	
7	La Trobe University	18	3	15	0	900	1769	50.9	12	Relegation
8	Swinburne University	18	1	17	0	948	2295	41.3	4	Relegation

Rules for classification: 1) points; 2) percentage; 3) number of points for.
(P) Premiers

=== Finals ===
	Grand Final
Saturday, 16 September (2:30pm)	Hawthorn 12.6 (78)	def. by	Elsternwick 21.19 (145)	Box Hill City Oval
Both teams promoted to Division 2

=== Club best and fairest ===
Club	Winner	Ref
Canterbury	Michael Topp	
Elsternwick		
Hawthorn	Will Meehan	
Hawthorn	Justin Raiti	
La Trobe University	Matt Ogle	
Power House	Sean Scotland	
Richmond Central	Lochie Conboy	
Swinburne University		
Wattle Park		

== Division 4 ==
2023 Division 4 season
- Teams: 6
- Premiers: North Brunswick
- Minor premiers: North Brunswick
- OJ Meehan Medallist: Corey Ely (St John's − 30 votes)
- Leading goalkicker: Jack Lee (Albert Park − 61 goals)

Division 4 was abolished at the end of the season and merged into Division 3.

=== Ladder ===
Pos	Team	Pld	W	L	D	PF	PA	PP	Pts	Qualification
1	North Brunswick (P)	18	17	0	1	1970	631	312.2	70	Finals series
2	Box Hill North	18	10	7	1	1719	1340	128.3	42	Finals series
3	Albert Park	18	10	8	0	1436	1377	104.3	40	Finals series
4	St John's	18	8	10	0	1216	1413	85.0	32	Finals series
5	Masala Dandenong	18	7	11	0	1537	1496	102.7	28	
6	Eley Park	18	1	17	0	863	2466	35.0	4	

Rules for classification: 1) points; 2) percentage; 3) number of points for.
(P) Premiers

=== Finals ===
	Grand Final
Sunday, September 17 (2:30pm)	North Brunswick 10.9 (69)	def.	Albert Park 8.6 (54)	Garvey Oval
Both teams promoted to Division 3

=== Club best and fairest ===
Club	Winner	Ref
Albert Park		
Box Hill North	Blake Williams	
Eley Park	Kane Scanlon	
Masala Dandenong		
North Brunswick		
St John's		
