= 1926 MAFA season =

31st season of the Metropolitan Amateur Football Association

- Date: 1 May − 25 September 1925
- Teams: 26

The 1926 MAFA season was the 31st season of the Metropolitan Amateur Football Association (MAFA), an Australian rules football competition played in the state of Victoria. The season began on 1 May and concluded on 25 September, with 26 teams participating across three divisions under a promotion and relegation system.

This was the first MAFA season with three divisions, with C Section established in response to an influx of new clubs.

== Association membership ==
Eight clubs − Brunswick, Gardenvale-Middle Brighton, Geelong, Glen Huntly, Kew Juniors, Sandringham Juniors, South Caulfield and St Paul's Ascot Vale − entered the MAFA in 1926. Gardenvale-Middle Brighton was renamed to Brightonvale (also spelt "Brighton Vale") prior to the start of the season. Old Melburnians and Teachers' College also entered second teams, just as Elsternwick had been fielding an "Elsternwick B" team since 1923.

Caulfield applied to return to the MAFA after being expelled during the 1925 season, but its application was refused.

== A Section ==
1926 MAFA A Section season
- Date: 1 May − 11 September 1926
- Teams: 10
- Premiers: Old Scotch; 3rd A Section premiership
- Minor premiers: Old Scotch; 2nd A Section minor premiership

Old Scotch won the A Section premiership for the third time, defeating Elsternwick by 12 points in the grand final.

=== Ladder ===
Pos	Team	Pld	W	L	D	PF	PA	PP	Pts	Qualification
1	Old Scotch (P)	18	16	2	0	1919		52.7	64	Finals series
2	Old Melburnians	18	14	4	0			73.8	56	Finals series
3	Elsternwick	18	14	4	0			75.9	56	Finals series
4	University A	18	12	5	1			96.5	50	Finals series
5	University B	18	10	8	0			80.5	40	
6	Teachers' College	18							24	
7	Geelong	18							22	
8	Old Caulfield Grammarians	18							20	
9	Murrumbeena	18							16	Relegation
10	Hampton	18							12	Relegation

Rules for classification: 1) points; 2) percentage; 3) number of points for.
(P) Premiers

=== Finals ===
1926 MAFA A Section Grand Final
Saturday, 11 September	Old Scotch	def.	Elsternwick	Elsternwick Park (crowd: 2,000)
7.14 (56); 9.16 (70)	Q1; Q2; Q3; Final	6.14 (50); 7.16 (58)
W. Vickers 3, J. McLorrinan 2, Barnett, Fergle, G. Law, Dawes	Goals	Lamplough 2, Strange, Heard, Dodd, Morris, Howell
McTaggart, A. Stanley, Francis, A. Moore, Grounds	Best	Dodd, Shaw, Heard, Thomas, Loughrey

== B Section ==
1926 MAFA B Section season
- Date: 1 May − 18 September 1926
- Teams: 8
- Premiers: Collegians; 1st B Section premiership
- Minor premiers: St Paul's Ascot Vale; 1st B Section minor premiership

Collegians won the B Section premiership for the first time, defeating minor premiers St Paul's Ascot Vale by 53 points in the grand final. Both clubs were promoted to A Section for the 1927 season.

=== Ladder ===
Pos	Team	Pld	W	L	D	PF	PA	PP	Pts	Qualification
1	St Paul's Ascot Vale	14	12	2	0			75.1	48	Finals series
2	Sandringham	14	11	2	1			71.3	46	Finals series
3	Collegians (P)	14	10	2	2			61.1	44	Finals series
4	Old Trinity	14	9	5	0			91.6	36	Finals series
5	Old Xaverians	14							16	
6	Old Brighton	14							14	
7	Elsternwick B	14							12	
8	Old Haileybury	14							8	Relegation (Note: Old Haileybury was ultimately not relegated to C Section in 1927 after Old Brighton and Elsternwick both withdrew from B Section.)

Rules for classification: 1) points; 2) percentage; 3) number of points for.
(P) Premiers

=== Finals ===
1926 MAFA B Section Grand Final
Sunday, 18 September	St Paul's Ascot Vale	def. by	Collegians	Tulip Street Reserve
3.4 (22); 7.8 (50); 8.9 (57); 8.9 (57)	Q1; Q2; Q3; Final	4.2 (26); 7.3 (45); 10.4 (64); 17.8 (110)
Mulgahy 3, A. Cope 2, Gillard, R. Kerr, Jennings	Goals	Cook 9, Oakley 4, Matthews 2, Thackeray, Dixon
Mulgahy, Kerr, Crase, Scott, Gillard	Best	Cook, Oakley, Matthews, Phillips, Eggleston, Waugh
Injuries	Heathershaw (face)

== C Section ==
1926 MAFA C Section season
- Date: 1 May − 25 September 1926
- Teams: 8
- Premiers: Brightonvale; 1st C Section premiership
- Minor premiers: Glen Huntly; 1st C Section minor premiership

Brightonvale won the inaugural C Section premiership, defeating minor premiers Glen Huntly by 21 points in the grand final.

=== Ladder ===
Pos	Team	Pld	W	L	D	PF	PA	PP	Pts	Qualification
1	Glen Huntly	14	12	2	0			63.3	48	Finals series
2	Sandringham Juniors	14	11	3	0			58.5	44	Finals series
3	Brightonvale (P)	14	11	3	0			74.8	44	Finals series
4	Brunswick	14	8	6	0			81.5	32	Finals series
5	Kew Juniors	14							28	
6	Teachers' College	14							12	
7	Old Melburnians B	14							8	
8	South Caulfield	14							4	

Rules for classification: 1) points; 2) percentage; 3) number of points for.
(P) Premiers

=== Finals ===
1926 MAFA C Section Grand Final
Saturday, 25 September	Glen Huntly	def. by	Brightonvale	Beach Road Oval
4.5 (29) 8.14 (62)	Q1; Q2; Q3; Final	0.3 (3) 12.11 (83)	Umpires: Cave, Davy, Hacking
Oatley 3, Scott 2, Petrie, Nighton, Clarke	Goals	Hope 6, Cobb 2, Wilkinson, Shorthouse, Ralph, bark
Allen, Oatley, W. Hunt, Pearsall, Scott	Best	Hall, Knight, S. Hall, Ralph, Hope
