= 1924 MAFA season =

29th season of the Metropolitan Amateur Football Association

- Date: 3 May − 20 September 1924
- Teams: 17

The 1924 MAFA season was the 29th season of the Metropolitan Amateur Football Association (MAFA), an Australian rules football competition played in the state of Victoria. The season began on 3 May and concluded on 20 September, with 17 teams participating across two divisions under a promotion and relegation system.

== A Section ==
1924 MAFA A Section season
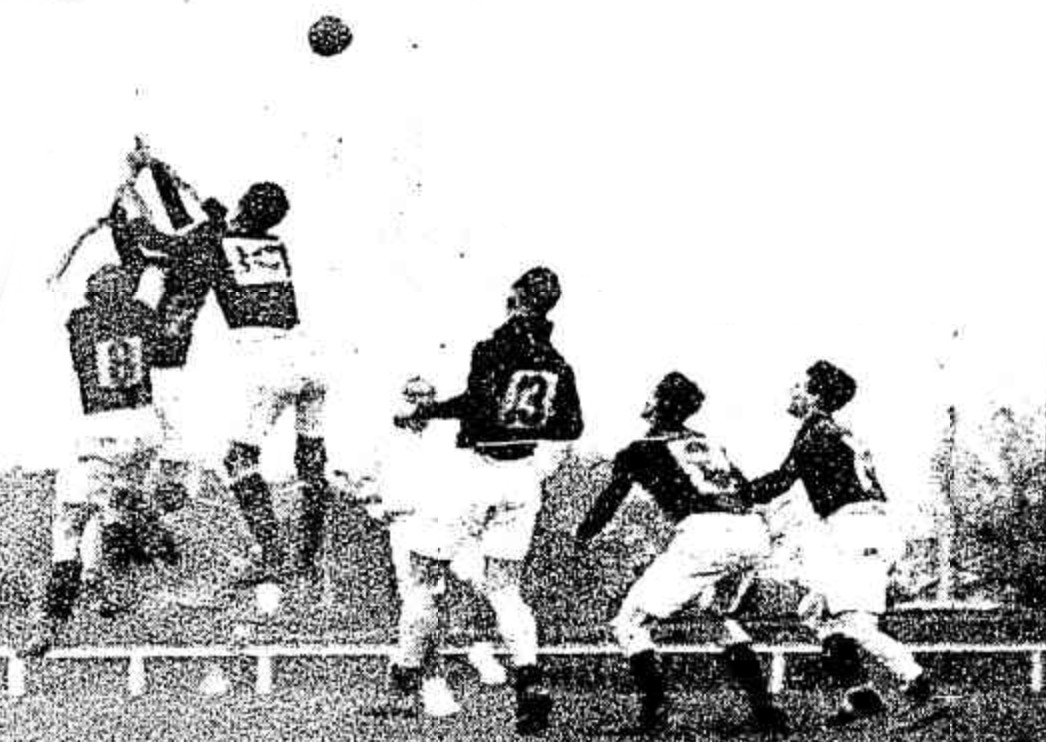
- Hampton and Old Scotch players contest the football during the A Section grand final
- Date: 3 May − 23 August 1924
- Teams: 8
- Premiers: Old Scotch; 2nd A Section premiership
- Minor premiers: Hampton; 1st A Section minor premiership
- Leading goalkicker: D. Dick (Hampton − 76 goals)

Old Scotch won the A Section premiership for the second time and the second year in a row, defeating minor premiers Hampton by 17 points in the grand final.

=== Ladder ===
Pos	Team	Pld	W	L	D	PF	PA	PP	Pts	Qualification
1	Hampton	14	11	3	0				44	Finals series
2	University B	14	10	4	0				40	Finals series
3	Old Scotch (P)	14	10	4	0				40	Finals series
4	Elsternwick	14	9	5	0				36	Finals series
5	University A	14	8	6	0				32	
6	Old Melburnians	14	4	10	0				16	
7	Sandringham	14	3	11	0				12	
8	Collegians	14	1	13	0				4	Relegation

Rules for classification: 1) points; 2) percentage; 3) number of points for.
(P) Premiers

=== Finals ===
	Semi-finals
Saturday, 9 August	University B 11.12 (78)	def. by	Elsternwick 11.13 (79)
Saturday, 9 August	Hampton 11.7 (73)	def. by	Old Scotch 13.14 (92)

	Preliminary final
Saturday, 16 August	Old Scotch 9.14 (68)	def.	Elsternwick 8.14 (62)	Albert Cricket Ground (crowd: 1,000)

1924 MAFA A Section Grand Final
Saturday, 23 August	Hampton	def. by	Old Scotch	Albert Cricket Ground (crowd: 1,500)
7.13 (55)	Q1; Q2; Q3; Final	11.6 (72)
Costello 3, Willis, Cox, Spry, D. Dick	Goals	C.T. Chapman 3, A. Staley 2, Heatley, A. Grounds, Empey, Trethowan, Baird, G. Law
Costello, G. Rees, Maudouit, Willis, Laver, Cutler	Best	C.T. Chapman, J. McLorinan, Wright, H. Staley, Baird

== B Section ==
1924 MAFA B Section season
- Date: 3 May − 20 September 1924
- Teams: 9
- Premiers: Murrumbeena; 1st B Section premiership
- Minor premiers: Old Trinity; 1st B Section minor premiership
- Leading goalkicker: Ryan (Old Xaverians − 87 goals)

Murrumbeena won the B Section premiership for the first time, defeating minor premiers Old Trinity by 31 points in the grand final, and were promoted to A Section for the 1925 season.

=== Ladder ===
Pos	Team	Pld	W	L	D	PF	PA	PP	Pts	Qualification
1	Old Trinity	16	13	3	0				52	Finals series
2	Old Caulfield Grammarians	16	12	4	0				48	Finals series
3	Murrumbeena (P)	16	11	5	0				44	Finals series
4	Teachers' College	16	10	6	0				40	Finals series
5	Old Xaverians	16	9	7	0				36	
6	Burwood	16	7	9	0				28	
7	Elsternwick B	16	5	11	0				20	
8	Caulfield City	16	3	13	0				12	
9	Old Brighton	16	3	13	0				12	

Rules for classification: 1) points; 2) percentage; 3) number of points for.
(P) Premiers

=== Finals ===
1924 MAFA B Section Grand Final
Saturday, 20 September	Old Trinity	def. by	Murrumbeena	Beach Road Oval (crowd: 1,000)
4.3 (27); 4.5 (29); 10.8 (68); 12.10 (82)	Q1; Q2; Q3; Final	1.3 (9); 7.10 (52); 11.12 (78); 16.17 (113)
Boddington 3, Tanton 3, Mylius 2, Knutson, Edwards, Stewart, Mitchell	Goals	Lundy 6, Cleal 3, McAuley 2, Watt, Armstrong, Callaghan, Rochfort, Beardsley
Boddington, Adams, T. Roberts, Knutson, Worrell	Best	Lundy, Cleal, McAuley, R. Scott, Callaghan
