= 1923 MAFA season =

28th season of the Metropolitan Amateur Football Association

- Date: 5 May − 27 August 1923
- Teams: 16

The 1923 MAFA season was the 28th season of the Metropolitan Amateur Football Association (MAFA), an Australian rules football competition played in the state of Victoria. The season began on 5 May and concluded on 25 August, with 16 teams participating across two divisions under a promotion and relegation system.

After splitting the competition into A Section and B Section for the first time in 1922, the MAFA introduced promotion and relegation in 1923, with the A Section wooden spooners relegated and the B Section premiers promoted. This system has remained in place in the MAFA (now VAFA) with minimal changes since 1923.

== Association membership ==
Black Rock lef the MAFA after one season, while Melbourne Shipping Company had disbanded during the 1922 season. Hampton and Murrumbeena both entered the competition, keeping the total number of clubs at 16.

== Notable events ==
- The MAFA began to trial a substitute player replacing injured players, which was not yet a rule in the Victorian Football League (VFL).

== A Section ==
1923 MAFA A Section season
- Date: 5 May − 18 August 1923
- Teams: 8
- Premiers: Old Scotch; 1st A Section premiership
- Minor premiers: University B 1st A Section minor premiership

Old Scotch won its first MAFA premiership, defeating University B by 34 points in the grand final.

=== Ladder ===
Pos	Team	Pld	W	L	D	PF	PA	PP	Pts	Qualification
1	University B	14				1171	758	151.5	40	Finals series
2	Old Scotch (P)	14				1046	791	132.2	40	Finals series
3	Hampton	14				1006	700	143.7	36	Finals series
4	University A	14				969	685	141.5	36	Finals series
5	Collegians	14				1148	788	145.1	32	
6	Elsternwick	14				851	885	96.2	24	
7	Old Melburnians	14				713	1414	50.4	8	
8	Old Xaverians	14				615	1493	41.2	8	Relegation

Rules for classification: 1) points; 2) percentage; 3) number of points for.
(P) Premiers

=== Finals ===
1923 MAFA A Section Grand Final
Saturday, 18 August	University B	def. by	Old Scotch	Elsternwick Park
5.4 (34); 6.4 (40); 5 point lead 12.7 (79)	Q1; Q2; Q3; Final	3.0 (18); 6.5 (41) 17.11 (113)
Although the MAFA used the Argus finals system, which gave the club that finished first on the ladder at the end of the home-and-away season (the minor premiers) the right to challenge the winner of the finals series for the premiership, the ability to challenge was not given to University B because it was even with Old Scotch on premiership points.

== B Section ==
1923 MAFA B Section season
- Date: 5 May − 25 August 1923
- Teams: 8
- Premiers: Sandringham; 1st B Section premiership
- Minor premiers: Murrumbeena; 1st B Section minor premiership
- Leading goalkicker: A.Lundy (Murrumbeena)

Sandringham won its first MAFA premiership, defeating Murrumbeena by four points in the first-ever B Section grand final.

=== Ladder ===
Pos	Team	Pld	W	L	D	PF	PA	PP	Pts	Qualification
1	Murrumbeena	14				1101	720	152.9	52	Finals series
2	Old Caulfield Grammarians	14				921	784	117.5	34	Finals series
3	Elsternwick B	14				762	752	101.3	32	Finals series
4	Sandringham (P)	14				831	830	100.1	28	Finals series
5	Melbourne Swimming Club	14				829	871	95.2	28	
6	Teachers' College	14				698	900	75.6	20	
7	Elwood	14				791	1006	78.6	18	
8	Old Trinity	14				956	1026	93.2	12	

Rules for classification: 1) points; 2) percentage; 3) number of points for.
(P) Premiers

=== Finals ===
1923 MAFA B Section Grand Final
Saturday, 25 August	Murrumbeena	def. by	Sandringham	University Oval
4.6 (30) 7.7 (49); 8.7 (55)	Q1; Q2; Q3; Final	2.5 (17) 6.8 (44); 8.11 (59)
Lundy 3	Goals	Harris 4, Kenna 2, Morrison, Woods
Cleal, Scott, Horwood, Lundy, Reeves, Callaghan	Best	Graham, Lee, Smith, Kenna, Harris, Wilson
