= Old Xaverians Oval =

Sporting venue in Melbourne, Victoria, Australia

- Interactive map of Old Xaverians Oval
- Location: Yarra Park, Melbourne
- Coordinates: 37°49′22″S 144°58′54″E

Construction
- Opened: 1959; 67 years ago
- Closed: 1999; 27 years ago
- Demolished: 2000; 26 years ago

Tenant
- Old Xaverians Football Club (1959–1994)

Old Xaverians Oval was an Australian rules football and cricket venue located within Yarra Park in Melbourne. It was the home ground of the Old Xaverians Football Club in the Victorian Amateur Football Association (VAFA).

== History ==
Old Xaverians Oval was constructed next to Old Scotch Oval in 1959. It was officially given its name in 1978.

In the 1980s, the Victorian state government, under then-premier John Cain, sought to establish a new tennis centre which would replace Kooyong Stadium as the venue of the Australian Open. The newly developed Flinders Park (later renamed to Melbourne Park) precinct was opened on 11 January 1988.

The second stage of the new tennis centre saw the construction of the Melbourne Multi Purpose Venue (later renamed to John Cain Arena). Old Xaverians remained at the ground until the end of the 1994 VAFA season, when it moved to Toorak Park in 1995 after Prahran withdrew from the Victorian Football Association (VFA).

Cricket matches continued to be played at Old Xaverians Oval throughout the 1990s. The Melbourne Cricket Club's third and fourth grade sides played their final matches at the ground in early 1999. After this, the ground was removed when construction of the Melbourne Multi Purpose Venue was completed in 2000.
