= 1922 MAFA season =

27th season of the Metropolitan Amateur Football Association

- Date: 6 May − 26 August 1922
- Teams: 16
- Premiers: University B 2nd premiership

The 1922 MAFA season was the 27th season of the Metropolitan Amateur Football Association (MAFA), an Australian rules football competition played in the state of Victoria. The season began on 6 May and concluded on 26 August, comprising a home-and-away season, followed by a three-week finals series.

For the first time, clubs were split into two divisions − A Section and B Section. No promotion and relegation system was in place, with the top four teams from each division playing in a combined finals series.

University B won the MAFA premiership for the second time and the second year in a row, defeating Collegians in the 1922 MAFA Grand Final.

== Association membership ==
South Yarra left the MJFA following the end of the 1921 season. Old Brightonians, which had failed to win a single game in 1921, also withdrew prior to the start of the 1922 season.

Four new clubs − Black Rock, Elwood, Melbourne Shipping Company and Murrumbeena − entered the MJFA. Melbourne Shipping Company disbanded on 17 July 1922, and its remaining games were treated as walkovers.

== Ladder ==
=== A Section ===
Pos	Team	Pld	W	L	D	Pts	Qualification
1	University A					48	Finals series
2	Collegians					48	Finals series
3	Old Scotch					44	Finals series
4	Old Melburnians					28	Finals series
5	Old Caulfield Grammarians					22	
6	Old Trinity					18	
7	Murrumbeena					14	
8	Melbourne Swimming Club		0		1	2	

(P) Premiers; (W) Club withdrew

=== B Section ===
Pos	Team	Pld	W	L	D	Pts	Qualification
1	Hampton					52	Finals series
2	University B					48	Finals series
3	Elsternwick					36	Finals series
4	Black Rock					28	Finals series
5	Teachers College					28	
6	Sandringham					20	
7	Elwood					8	
8	Melbourne Shipping Company (W)					4	

(P) Premiers; (W) Club withdrew

== Finals ==
=== First semi-finals ===
	First semi-finals
Saturday, 12 August	University A 6.15 (51)	def. by	Elsternwick 8.9 (57)	Melbourne Grammar School
Saturday, 12 August	Collegians 13.18 (96)	def.	Black Rock 3.2 (20)	Old Scotch Oval
Saturday, 12 August	Old Melburnians 8.6 (54)	def. by	University B 13.27 (105)	Elsternwick Park
Saturday, 12 August	Old Scotch Collegians 2.6 (18)	def. by	Hampton 10.9 (69)	University Oval

=== Second semi-finals ===
	Second semi-finals
Saturday, 19 August	Hampton 5.7 (37)	def. by	University B 8.10 (58)	Old Scotch Oval
Saturday, 19 August	Collegians 14.24 (108)	def.	Elsternwick 11.8 (74)	Beach Road Oval

=== Grand Final ===
1922 MAFA Grand Final
Saturday, 26 August (3:00pm)	University B	def.	Collegians	University Oval
9.9 (63) 10.11 (71)	Q1; Q2; Q3; Final	5.7 (37) 7.15 (57)	Umpires: Stanley, Meade, Coombes, Wilson, Murie

== Notable events ==
- An independent MAFA tribunal, as well as an Umpire's Association, were established in 1922.
