= 1925 MAFA season =

30th season of the Metropolitan Amateur Football Association

- Date: 2 May − 12 September 1925
- Teams: 17

The 1925 MAFA season was the 30th season of the Metropolitan Amateur Football Association (MAFA), an Australian rules football competition played in the state of Victoria. The season began on 2 May and concluded on 12 September, with 17 teams participating across two divisions under a promotion and relegation system.

== Association membership ==
The Burwood Football Club announced in March 1925 that it would withdraw from the MAFA after one season because of the difficulty in fielding a team. Old Haileybury were admitted into the competition at a meeting on 6 April, keeping the total number of clubs at 17.

=== Caulfield expulsion ===
Caulfield City was renamed to simply Caulfield prior to the start of the season.

Following a match between Caulfield and Old Caulfield Grammarians on 8 August, Old Caulfield made a formal complaint to the MAFA about the conduct of Caulfield's players and supporters, which was the fourth such complaint to be made against Caulfield. At a meeting on 17 August, the MAFA found that the conduct and language of the Caulfield supporters was objectionable and contributed to the extreme roughness of the game, and that a Caulfield supporter had run on to the playing area with the intention of hitting the Old Caulfield Grammarians' captain, Howell (and did strike him after the match).

The decision was made to expel Caulfield for the remainder of the 1925 season, giving the club the ability to apply for readmittance as long as it guaranteed the conduct would be suppressed. The expulsion meant that Elsternwick was guaranteed a place in the B Section finals series.

== Notable events ==
- The first-ever interstate amateur match was played between the MAFA (Victoria) and the South Australian Amateur Football League (SAAFL) on 7 June. Victoria defeated South Australia 21.22 (148) to 8.10 (58) before a "disappointing crowd" at the Melbourne Cricket Ground.

== A Section ==
1925 MAFA A Section season
- Date: 2 May − 22 August 1925
- Teams: 8
- Premiers: Elsternwick; 2nd A Section premiership
- Minor premiers: Old Scotch; 1st A Section minor premiership
- Leading goalkicker: Ewing (University A − 79 goals)

Elsternwick won the A Section premiership for the second time, defeating minor premiers Old Scotchby 21 points in the grand final.

=== Ladder ===
Pos	Team	Pld	W	L	D	PF	PA	PP	Pts	Qualification
1	Old Scotch	14				1233	847	146.7	44	Finals series
2	Elsternwick (P)	14				1082	870	124.4	40	Finals series
3	Hampton	14				1126	918	123.7	40	Finals series
4	Old Melburnians	14				1239	1066	116.3	32	Finals series
5	University B	14				1131	1058	106.9	30	
6	University A	14				1002	1035	96.8	18	
7	Murrumbeena	14				940	1330	70.1	12	
8	Sandringham	14	0	14	0	688	1331	51.6	0	Relegation

Rules for classification: 1) points; 2) percentage; 3) number of points for.
(P) Premiers

=== Finals ===
1925 MAFA A Section Grand Final
Saturday, 22 August (3:00pm)	Old Scotch	def. by	Elsternwick	University Oval
2.1 (13); 3.4 (22) 3.12 (30)	Q1; Q2; Q3; Final	1.5 (11); 2.7 (19) 6.15 (51)
D. Swann 2, Law	Goals	Simpson 2, Pick 2, Mountjoy, Strange

== B Section ==
1925 MAFA B Section season
- Date: 2 May − 12 September 1925
- Teams: 9
- Premiers: Old Caulfield Grammarians; 1st B Section premiership
- Minor premiers: Old Caulfield Grammarians; 1st B Section minor premiership
- Leading goalkicker: Dakin (Old Caulfield Grammarians − 119 goals)

Old Caulfield Grammarians won the B Section premiership for the first time, defeating Teachers' College by 37 points in the grand final. Both clubs were promoted to A Section in 1926.

=== Ladder ===
Pos	Team	Pld	W	L	D	PF	PA	PP	Pts	Qualification
1	Old Caulfield Grammarians (P)	16	14	2	0				56	Finals series
2	Collegians	16	12	4	0				48	Finals series
3	Elsternwick B	16	10	5	1				42	Finals series
4	Teachers' College	16	10	6	0				40	Finals series
5	Old Xaverians	16	7	8	1				30	
6	Old Haileybury	16	4	12	0				16	
7	Old Trinity	16	3	13	0				12	
8	Old Brighton	16	2	14	0				8	
−	Caulfield (E)	14							32	

Rules for classification: 1) points; 2) percentage; 3) number of points for.
(P) Premiers; (E) Expelled

=== Finals ===
1925 MAFA B Section Grand Final
Saturday, 12 September	Old Caulfield Grammarians	def.	Teachers' College	Yarra Park
13.14 (92)	Q1; Q2; Q3; Final	8.7 (55)	Umpires: Davey, Hacking, Smith, Walters, McCann; Best on ground: Salter (Teachers' College)
Dakin 4, Cassidy 4, Dunstan 2, Kohn 2, Chafey	Goals	Soloman 3, Collins 2, Beaumont, Beed, Potter
Dakin, Cassidy, Dunstan, Buntine, Pie	Best	Soloman, Salter, Beaumont, Moore, Meldrum
Teachers' College captain W. Aughterson was ill and unable to play.
