= Guy McKenna =

Australian rules footballer (born 1969)

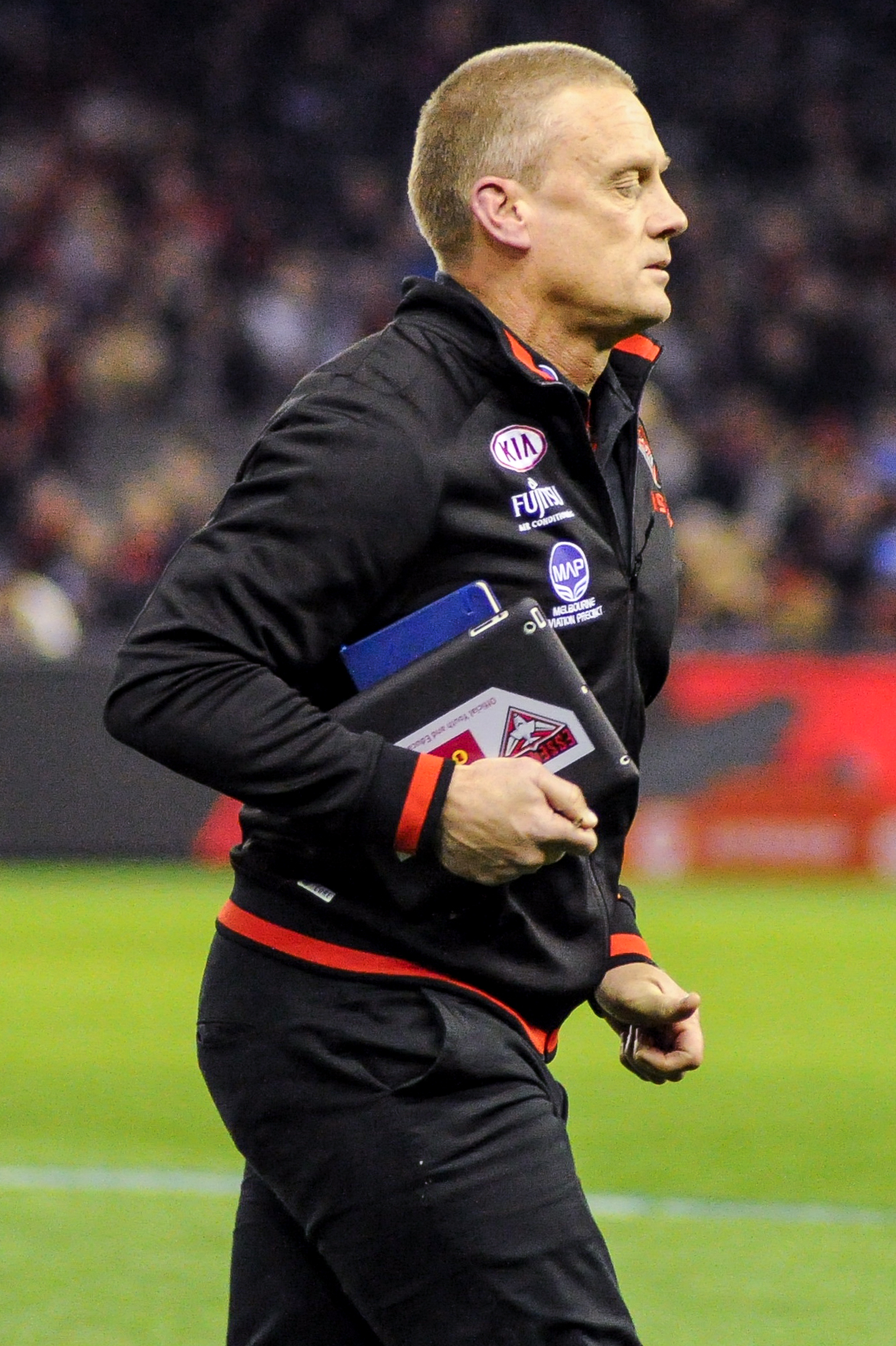
- McKenna in June 2017

Personal information
- Full name: Guy Lindsay McKenna
- Nickname: Bluey
- Born: 11 May 1969 (age 57); Perth, Western Australia
- Original team: Carine JFC
- Height: 184 cm (6 ft 0 in)
- Weight: 88 kg (194 lb)
- Position: Half-back flanker

Playing career^{1}
Years	Club	Games (Goals)
1985–88; 1992	Claremont	50 (5)
1988–2000	West Coast	267 (28)
Total		317 (33)

Representative team honours
Years	Team	Games (Goals)
1987–1997	Western Australia	5 (1)

Coaching career^{3}
Years	Club	Games (W–L–D)
2003	Claremont	21 (12–9–0)
2011–2014	Gold Coast	88 (24–64–0)
- ^{1} Playing statistics correct to the end of 2000.^{3} Coaching statistics correct as of 2014.

Career highlights
- Claremont premiership side 1987; West Coast Eagles Rookie of the Year 1988; VFL Team of the Year 1989; 2× West Coast Club Champion 1989, 1999; 3× All-Australian team 1991, 1993, 1994; 2× West Coast premiership side 1992, 1994; West Coast Best Clubman Award 1994; Western Australia State of Origin captain 1996, 1997; West Coast captain 1999–2000; Australian Football Hall of Fame inductee 2009

Guy Lindsay McKenna (born 11 May 1969) is a retired Australian rules football player and the former senior coach of the Gold Coast Football Club in the Australian Football League (AFL). McKenna played 267 games for the West Coast Eagles, including the 1992 and 1994 premiership wins. He captained the club between 1999 and 2000 AFL season.

== WAFL career ==
Educated at Carine Senior High School and originally from Carine Junior Football Club, McKenna was zoned to Claremont in the West Australian Football League (WAFL), where he played 49 games in four seasons from 1985 to 1987 and in 1992, including the Tigers' 1987 premiership.

== Playing career ==
=== West Coast Eagles ===
McKenna was recruited by the West Coast Eagles for the 1988 season with a pre-draft selection. He played for the Eagles from 1988 until 2000, notching up 267 games and booting 28 goals. He formed one of the most feared backlines in the AFL, along with John Worsfold, Ashley McIntosh, Glen Jakovich and Michael Brennan and was known for his cool demeanour and reliability. McKenna was also part of the club's 1992 and 1994 premiership sides.

He won the Club Champion Award twice, once in 1989 and the other in 1999, finishing in the top three another five times.

He was captain from 1998 until his retirement at the end of 2000. He kicked a memorable goal on the final kick of his career in Round 22 2000 which frenzied the crowd at Subiaco Oval.

McKenna boasts two unusual on-field distinctions from his career: In Round 20, 1994, he was the first player ever ordered from the ground under the blood rule, which had been introduced to the league that week. Then, in a match against St Kilda in Round 22, 1999, for the first time since Essendon's Jack Clarke in 1958, McKenna became the third captain in league history to call for a headcount; however, the teams were even.

== Coaching career ==
=== Early career ===
After retiring, he coached in the West Australian Football League as senior coach of the Claremont Football Club with considerable success before moving to an assistant coaching role with the West Coast Eagles.

=== Collingwood assistant coach (2003–2008) ===
McKenna joined Collingwood Football Club at the end of 2003 as an assistant coach under senior coach Michael Malthouse his former mentor. McKenna left the Collingwood Football Club at the end of the 2008 season.

=== Gold Coast Suns senior coach (2011–2014) ===
In 2008, McKenna was appointed the inaugural senior coach of the newly founded Gold Coast Suns Football Club. He oversaw their TAC Cup and VFL campaigns prior to their entrance in the AFL. In the 2011 season, the Gold Coast Suns under McKenna in its inaugural season in the AFL league, finished in last place on the ladder with three wins and nineteen losses for the wooden spoon. In the 2012 season, the Gold Coast suns under McKenna finished in seventeenth position (second-last) on the ladder, yet again with three wins and nineteen losses. In the 2013 season, the Gold Coast Suns under McKenna improved on-field performance when they finished fourteenth on the ladder with eight wins and fourteen losses. In the 2014 season, Gold Coast Suns under McKenna finished in twelve place on the ladder with ten wins and twelve losses. But however after the Suns failed to make the finals in their first four years in the AFL senior competition league, McKenna was sacked as senior coach of the Gold Coast Suns on 1 October 2014, at the end of the 2014 season. McKenna was then replaced by Rodney Eade as Gold Coast Suns Football Club senior coach.

McKenna coached Gold Coast Suns Football Club to a total of 88 games with 24 wins and 64 losses to a winning percentage of 27 percent.

=== Essendon assistant coach (2015–2017) ===
On 9 November 2015, McKenna was appointed as an assistant coach in the position of line coach at Essendon under senior coach John Worsfold, who he previously played with as a former teammate at West Coast Eagles. McKenna left the Essendon Football Club at the end of the 2017 season.

=== Caulfield Grammarians senior coach (2023–2024) ===
On 15 November 2022, McKenna was announced as the senior coach for the Caulfield Grammarians Football Club in the Victorian Amateur Football Association (VAFA) for the 2023 season. The club finished last in Premier Division with only one victory, and was relegated to Premier B in 2024. In 2024, the Grammarians finished eighth and narrowly missed out on relegation for a second straight season.

== Statistics ==
=== Playing statistics ===
Legend
G	Goals	K	Kicks	D	Disposals	T	Tackles
B	Behinds	H	Handballs	M	Marks

Season	Team	No.	Games	Totals							Averages (per game)						
Season	Team	No.	Games	G	B	K	H	D	M	T	G	B	K	H	D	M	T
1988	West Coast	17	18	0	3	169	156	325	73	17	0.0	0.2	9.4	8.7	18.1	4.1	0.9
1989	West Coast	17	20	1	1	184	184	368	113	26	0.1	0.1	9.2	9.2	18.4	5.7	1.3
1990	West Coast	17	26	4	3	252	210	462	97	52	0.2	0.1	9.7	8.1	17.8	3.7	2.0
1991	West Coast	17	26	2	6	259	210	469	80	41	0.1	0.2	10.0	8.1	18.0	3.1	1.6
1992†	West Coast	17	12	2	2	91	95	186	37	22	0.2	0.2	7.6	7.9	15.5	3.1	1.8
1993	West Coast	17	21	1	1	199	165	364	92	39	0.0	0.0	9.5	7.9	17.3	4.4	1.9
1994†	West Coast	17	25	5	4	227	202	429	103	49	0.2	0.2	9.1	8.1	17.2	4.1	2.0
1995	West Coast	17	23	5	2	155	208	363	81	44	0.2	0.1	6.7	9.0	15.8	1.9	
1996	West Coast	17	22	5	0	204	175	379	118	58	0.2	0.0	9.3	8.0	17.2	5.4	2.6
1997	West Coast	17	20	1	0	177	145	322	89	58	0.1	0.0	8.9	7.3	16.1	4.5	2.9
1998	West Coast	17	22	1	1	209	161	370	82	64	0.0	0.0	9.5	7.3	16.8	3.7	2.9
1999	West Coast	17	23	0	1	216	175	391	113	41		0.0	9.4	7.6	17.0	4.9	1.8
2000	West Coast	17	9	1	1	56	63	119	31	12	0.1	0.1	6.2	7.0	13.2	3.4	1.3
Career			267	28	25	2398	2149	4547	1109	523	0.1	0.1	9.0	8.0	17.0	4.2	2.0

=== Coaching statistics ===
Legend
W	Wins	L	Losses	D	Draws	W%	Winning percentage	LP	Ladder position	LT	League teams

Season	Team	Games	W	L	D	W %	LP	LT
2011	Gold Coast	22	3	19	0	13.6%	17	17
2012	Gold Coast	22	3	19	0	13.6%	17	18
2013	Gold Coast	22	8	14	0	36.4%	14	18
2014	Gold Coast	22	10	12	0	45.5%	12	18
Career totals		88	24	64	0	27.3%		
