= Brighton Beach Oval =

Sporting venue in Brighton, Victoria

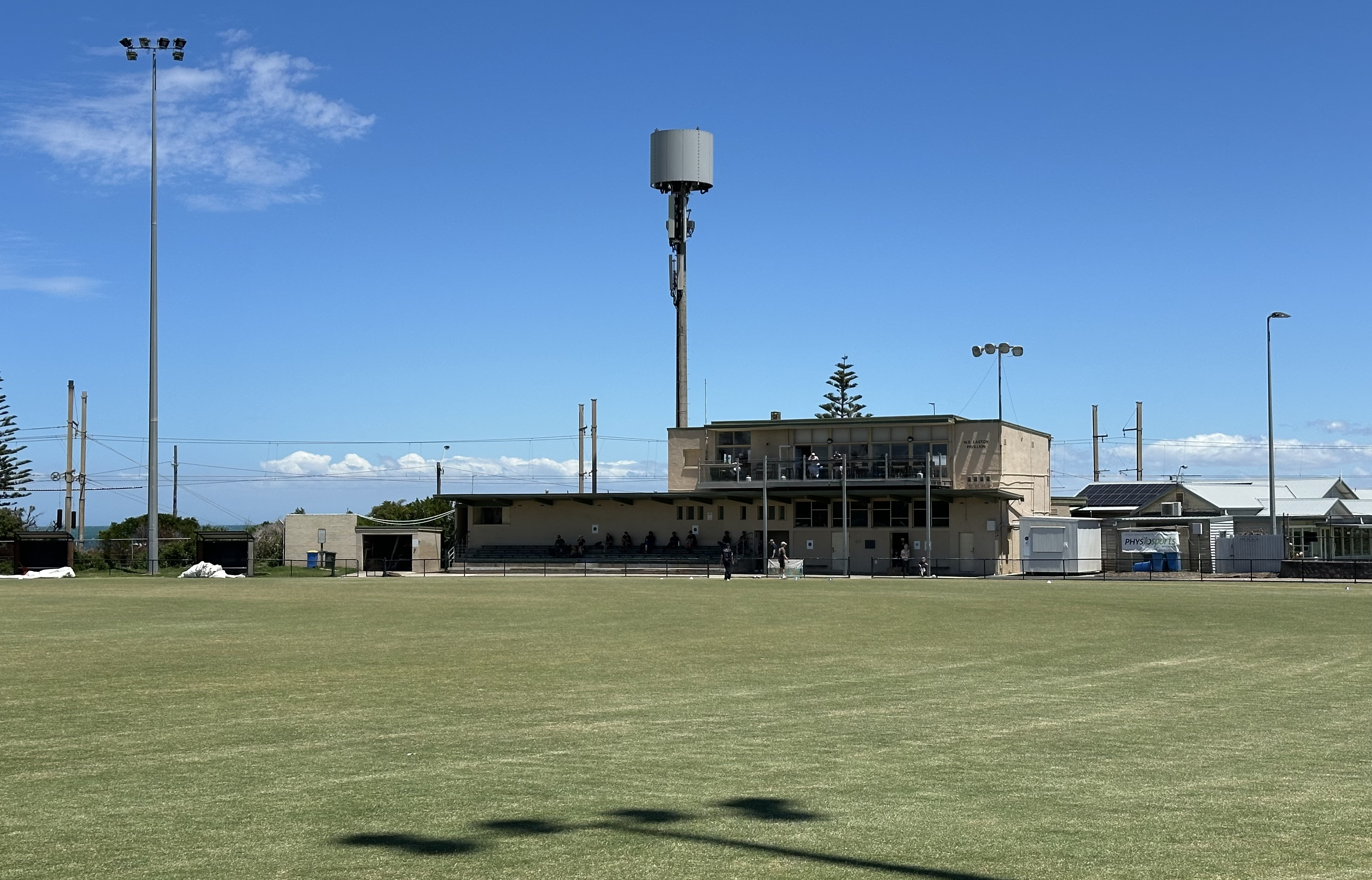
- Interactive map of Brighton Beach Oval
- Location: Brighton, Victoria
- Coordinates: 37.928456224926°S 144.99112832301122°E
- Owner: City of Bayside
- Record attendance: 6,000 (Brighton vs Port Melbourne, 30 May 1925)
- Public transit: ● Brighton Beach; Brighton Beach

Construction
- Opened: 1880s; 145 years ago

Tenants
- Old Brighton Football Club (VAFA); Brighton Cricket Club (VSDCA)

Brighton Beach Oval is an Australian rules football and cricket venue located in the Melbourne suburb of Brighton. It is the home of the Old Brighton Grammarians Football Club in the Victorian Amateur Football Association (VAFA) and the Brighton Cricket Club in the Victorian Sub-District Cricket Association (VSDCA).

== History ==
Brighton Beach Oval was established around the 1880s, with the Brighton Cricket Club moving to the ground by 1887. A grandstand was constructed in 1884. The Brighton Football Club played its home matches at the ground and joined the Victorian Football Association (VFA) in 1908.

At the end of the 1926 VFA season, Brighton moved to Elsternwick Park, sharing the ground with the Elsternwick Amateur Football Club, which competed in the Metropolitan Amateur Football Association (MAFA). The newly-formed Sandringham District Football Club used the ground when it entered the MAFA in 1927. One VFA match was played at Brighton Beach Oval in 1931 because Elsternwick Park was booked for a MAFA match between Elsternwick and State Savings Bank.

After several years in dangerous condition, the turf at the ground was upgraded in 2014.

== Transport access ==
Brighton Beach Oval is located near the Brighton Beach railway station, with Sandringham line trains travelling next to the ground. During a VFA match in 1924, a ball was kicked into a passing train, injuring one passenger.
