= 2024 VAFA season =

123rd season of the Victorian Amateur Football Association

- Date: 13 April – 27 September 2024
- Teams: 61
- Matches played: 566

The 2024 VAFA season was the 123rd season of the Victorian Amateur Football Association (VAFA), the largest senior community Australian rules football competition in Victoria. The season began on 13 April and concluded on 27 September, with 61 teams participating across six divisions under a promotion and relegation system.

== Association membership ==
Following the conclusion of the 2023 season, Ivanhoe and Old Paradians left the VAFA and transferred to the Northern Football Netball League (NFNL) for 2024. This resulted in the abolishment of Division 4, which subsequently merged into Division 3. Additionally, because of extremely low player numbers during pre-season training, Masala Dandenong announced in January 2024 that it would withdraw from Division 3 and instead compete in the Thirds competition.

After seven years in the Club XVIII and Thirds competitions, the Chadstone Football Club re-entered a senior team in Division 3. In round 1, with 22 club debutants, Chadstone defeated Eley Park by 57 points to claim its first VAFA divisional win in 3,256 days.

While in recess in 2023, the Old Mentonians Football Club was renamed to Mentone Panthers. The club returned to the VAFA in 2024 with a team in the Thirds competition.

The Westbourne Grammarians Football Club remained in recess for a second season, although it entered a senior team in the VAFA Women's (VAFAW) competition.

=== Team changes ===
The following teams changed division after the 2023 season:

2024 VAFA season
Division	Promoted to division ▲	Relegated to division ▼	Withdrawn	New
Premier	Fitzroy; St Bernard's	N/A	None	None
Premier B	Old Camberwell; Old Ivanhoe	Caulfield Grammarians; Old Haileybury	None	None
Premier C	Glen Eira; Oakleigh	AJAX; Monash Blues	None	None
Division 1	Old Yarra Cobras; Parkside	Ormond	None	None
Division 2	Elsternwick; Hawthorn	Ivanhoe; Preston Bullants	Old Paradians	None
Division 3	Albert Park; North Brunswick	Aquinas; St Mary's Salesian	None	Box Hill North; Chadstone; Eley Park; St John's

== Notable events ==
- Starting in 2024, Sports Entertainment Network (SEN) broadcast one game from Premier Division every Saturday, including both home-and-away and finals matches.
- Williamstown CYMS forfeited its round 11 under-19s matches in both Premier and Division 4 after its players damaged their own clubrooms during a party.
- During a round 12 Premier Division match, St Kevin's player Michael Pisker collided with a University Blues player's legs when running to follow the ball. Pisker was placed into an induced coma and lost permanent sight in his right eye, with footage of the incident removed from the VAFA website. St Kevin's created the "Michael Pisker Most Courageous Player" award at the end of the season, with Pisker himself given the award for the 2024 season.
- In the Under-19s Division 2 Grand Final between Old Camberwell and University Blues, players from Old Camberwell began celebrating when the siren went at the end of the fourth quarter, believing that they had won the game by five points. However, an umpiring decision for tripping had been made fractions of a second before the siren blew, giving the Blues a free kick from around 60 metres from goal. Four players from Old Camberwell players had run onto the field while celebrating and were penalised for doing so, with Blues player Angus Watson awarded a 50-metre penalty, kicking a goal after the siren to give the Blues a one-point win of 6.9 (45) to 5.14 (44). The VAFA released a statement after the grand final, saying it was "fully satisfied that the umpire correctly adjudicated the situation in accordance with the appropriate AFL Laws of the Game".

== Premier ==
2024 Premier Division season
- Date: 13 April − 27 September 2024
- Teams: 10
- Premiers: Old Scotch; 10th Premier premiership
- Minor premiers: Old Brighton
- Relegated: Fitzroy; Old Melburnians
- JN Woodrow Medallist: Sam Fisher (Old Xaverians − 16 votes)
- Leading goalkicker: Pat Kerr (St Kevin's − 53 goals)
- Matches played: 94

Old Scotch won the Premier Division premiership for the 10th time, defeating minor premiers Old Brighton by 18 points in the grand final. It was Old Scotch's first men's senior premiership in 46 years and its second senior premiership in 2024, with the club also claiming its first Premier Division premiership in the VAFA Women's.

This was Fitzroy's first-ever season in Premier Division after being promoted at the end of 2023, although the club finished second-last and was relegated back to Premier B for the 2025 season. Old Melburnians was also relegated.

=== Ladder ===
Pos	Team	Pld	W	L	D	PF	PA	PP	Pts	Qualification
1	Old Brighton	18	16	2	0	1613	1118	144.3	64	Finals series
2	St Kevin's	18	12	5	1	1374	1152	119.3	50	Finals series
3	Old Scotch (P)	18	12	6	0	1441	1090	132.2	48	Finals series
4	Collegians	18	11	7	0	1431	1303	109.8	44	Finals series
5	Old Xaverians	18	10	8	0	1398	1238	112.9	40	
6	University Blues	18	7	11	0	1257	1437	87.5	28	
7	University Blacks	18	7	11	0	1103	1356	81.3	28	
8	St Bernard's	18	5	13	0	1377	1548	89.0	20	
9	Fitzroy	18	5	13	0	1154	1545	74.7	20	Relegation
10	Old Melburnians	18	4	11	0	1179	1540	76.6	16	Relegation

Rules for classification: 1) points; 2) percentage; 3) number of points for.
(P) Premiers

=== Finals ===
	Semi-finals
Saturday, 14 September (2:30pm)	Old Brighton 10.7 (67)	def.	St Kevin's 8.13 (61)	Elsternwick Park
Saturday, 14 September (2:30pm)	Old Scotch 12.14 (86)	def.	Collegians 6.6 (42)	Trevor Barker Oval

	Preliminary final
Saturday, 21 September (2:30pm)	St Kevin's 6.11 (47)	def. by	Old Scotch 14.7 (91)	Elsternwick Park

2024 VAFA Premier Division Grand Final
Friday, 27 September (2:30pm)	Old Brighton	def. by	Old Scotch	Elsternwick Park
1.2 (8); 6.10 (46); 8.14 (62); 10.17 (77)	Q1; Q2; Q3; Final	4.3 (43); 8.5 (53); 12.8 (80); 14.11 (95)	Jock Nelson Medal: Ryan Valentine (Old Scotch); Television broadcast: KommunityTV
J. Campigli 2, S. Collins 2, J. Hope 2, N. Pavlou 2, T. Fishe, J. Segar	Goals	R. Valentine 4, J. Tarrant 4, W. Clark 3, O. Badr, C. Lean, J. Polkinghorne
M. Lohan, S. Collins, S. Flockart, E. Avis, A. Jarnestrom, J. Hope	Best	R. Valentine, A. Jelbart, B. Hays, J. Tarrant, S. Grant, C. Cormack
Old Brighton captain Harry Hill was unable to play after suffering a concussion the club's round 18 match against St Kevin's. The concussion occurred 20 days prior to the grand final, but new rules introduced in March 2024 by the Australian Football League (AFL) for non-AFL competitions meant players had to stand down for a 21-day period. Old Brighton appealed to the VAFA for an exemption, but it was not granted. Co-vice-captain Tom Fisher took over from Hill as captain in the grand final.

=== Club best and fairest ===
Club	Winner	Ref
Collegians	Jasper Davy	
Fitzroy	Darcy Lowrie	
Old Brighton	Harry Hill	
Old Melburnians	Ben Harding	
Old Melburnians	Will Nichols	
Old Scotch	Charlie Cormack	
Old Xaverians	Alec Spralja	
St Bernard's	Ben Overman	
St Kevin's	Billy Coates	
University Blacks	Henry Bennett	
University Blues	Martin Gleeson	

=== Club leadership ===
Club	Coach	Leadership group			Ref
Club	Coach	Captain(s)	Vice-captain(s)	Other leader(s)	Ref
Collegians	Jordie McKenzie	Sam Hibbins			
Fitzroy	Travis Ronaldson	Jack Hart			
Old Brighton	Marcel Bruin	Harry Hill	Tom Fisher, Mike Karayannis		
Old Melburnians	Paul Satterley	Jackson Paine	Will Nichols	Ed Michelmore, Lachie Haysman, Ben Haysman, Daniel Coffield, Ed Smart	
Old Scotch	Mark Gnatt	Andy Jelbart			
Old Xaverians	Daniel Donati				
St Bernard's	Steven Alessio				
St Kevin's	Anthony Lynch				
University Blacks	Dale Bower	Campbell Moorfield			
University Blues	Guy Martyn				

== Premier B ==
2024 Premier B season
- Date: 13 April − 22 September 2024
- Teams: 10
- Premiers: Old Haileybury; 3rd Premier B premiership
- Minor premiers: Old Haileybury
- Promoted: Old Haileybury; De La Salle
- Relegated: Beaumaris; St Bedes/Mentone Tigers
- GT Moore Medallist: Billy Murphy (Old Ivanhoe − 26 votes)
- Leading goalkicker: Harry Laukens (Old Camberwell − 46 goals); Dominic Payman (Old Trinity − 46 goals)
- Matches played: 94

Old Haileybury won the Premier B premiership for the third time, defeating De La Salle by 94 points in the grand final. Both clubs were promoted to Premier Division for the 2025 season, while Beaumaris and St Bedes/Mentone Tigers were relegated to Premier C.

=== Ladder ===
Pos	Team	Pld	W	L	D	PF	PA	PP	Pts	Qualification
1	Old Haileybury (P)	18	14	3	1	1633	1018	160.4	58	Finals series
2	De La Salle	18	13	5	0	1691	1147	147.4	52	Finals series
3	Old Trinity	18	12	5	1	1614	1259	128.2	50	Finals series
4	Old Geelong	18	12	6	0	1381	1245	110.9	48	Finals series
5	Old Ivanhoe	18	10	8	0	1340	1388	96.5	40	
6	Old Camberwell	18	9	8	1	1260	1296	97.2	38	
7	Williamstown CYMS	18	5	12	1	1289	1642	78.5	22	
8	Caulfield Grammarians	18	5	13	0	1235	1529	80.8	20	
9	Beaumaris	18	5	13	0	1125	1428	78.8	20	Relegation
10	St Bedes/Mentone Tigers	18	3	15	0	1134	1750	64.8	12	Relegation

Rules for classification: 1) points; 2) percentage; 3) number of points for.
(P) Premiers

=== Finals ===
2024 VAFA Premier B Grand Final
Sunday, 22 September (2:30pm)	Old Haileybury	def.	De La Salle	Trevor Barker Oval
2.6 (18); 8.9 (57); 12.12 (84); 19.15 (129)	Q1; Q2; Q3; Final	0.2 (2); 1.3 (9); 2.4 (16); 5.5 (35)	Ian Cordner Medal: Andreas Stefanakis (Old Haileybury)
A. Stefanakis 5, H. Jones 4, C. Harrop 3, J. Magner 3, H. Nosiara, B. Seccull, B. Steele, L. Treverton	Goals	R. O'Meara 2, C. Algeri, F. Cameron, A. Indovino
A. Stefanakis, C. Sinclair, J. Gasparini, C. Harrop, D. Seccull, C. Riley, H. Jones	Best	J. Williams, C. Aitken, L. Gawel, H. Nicholson, T. Shannon, F. Cameron

=== Club leadership ===
Club	Coach	Leadership group			Ref
Club	Coach	Captain(s)	Vice-captain(s)	Other leader(s)	Ref
Beaumaris	Josh Bourke				
Caulfield Grammarians					
De La Salle					
Old Camberwell					
Old Geelong					
Old Haileybury	Daniel Ward	Bredie Seccull	Brodie Steele		
Old Ivanhoe					
Old Trinity					
St Bedes/Mentone Tigers					
Williamstown CYMS					

== Premier C ==
2024 Premier C season
- Date: 13 April − 21 September 2024
- Teams: 10
- Premiers: Old Carey; 1st Premier C premiership
- Minor premiers: Old Carey
- Promoted: Old Carey; Hampton Rovers
- Relegated: Monash Blues; Oakleigh
- L Zachariah Medallist: Matthew Fewings (Mazenod − 28 votes)
- Leading goalkicker: Mitch Brown (Parkdale Vultures − 87 goals)
- Matches played: 94

Old Carey won the Premier C premiership for the first time, defeating the Hampton Rovers by 89 points in the grand final. Both clubs were promoted to Premier B for the 2025 season, while Monash Blues and Oakleigh were relegated to Division 1.

=== Ladder ===
Pos	Team	Pld	W	L	D	PF	PA	PP	Pts	Qualification
1	Old Carey (P)	18	16	2	0	1985	954	208.1	64	Finals series
2	Hampton Rovers	18	16	2	0	1599	872	183.4	64	Finals series
3	AJAX	18	15	3	0	1975	1085	182.0	60	Finals series
4	Parkdale Vultures	18	12	6	0	1753	1169	150.0	48	Finals series
5	Mazenod	18	9	9	0	1324	1469	90.1	36	
6	Glen Eira	18	8	10	0	1187	1609	73.8	32	
7	PEGS	18	6	12	0	1317	1444	91.2	24	
8	Marcellin	18	5	13	0	1070	1585	67.5	20	
9	Monash Blues	18	2	16	0	892	1879	47.5	8	Relegation
10	Oakleigh	18	1	17	0	931	1967	47.3	4	Relegation

Rules for classification: 1) points; 2) percentage; 3) number of points for.
(P) Premiers

=== Finals ===
2024 VAFA Premier C Grand Final
Saturday, 21 September (2:40pm)	Old Carey	def.	Hampton Rovers	Trevor Barker Oval
3.3 (21); 8.7 (55); 16.9 (105); 20.17 (137)	Q1; Q2; Q3; Final	1.0 (6); 4.2 (26); 5.4 (34); 7.6 (48)
R. Thompson 7, B. Andrews 2, N. Brewin 2, J. Alexander, T. Borghouts, C. Connell-Tobin, L. Godden, T. Jepson, T. Newton, J. Rule, T. Warren, M. Wooffindin	Goals	W. Crawford 2, L. O'Driscoll 2, M. Coughlin, H. Garrow, A. Hug
R. Thompson, T. Jepson, B. Waters, L. Anderson, H. Hill, O. Dickson	Best	M. Van der Straaten, H. Lay, L. O'Driscoll, J. Delaney, A. Hug, J. Prosser

== Division 1 ==
2024 Division 1 season
- Date: 13 April − 14 September 2024
- Teams: 10
- Premiers: Prahran; 1st Division 1 premiership
- Minor premiers: Prahran
- Promoted: Prahran; Parkside
- Relegated: West Brunswick; Old Yarra Cobras
- LS Pepper Medallist: Shaun Chapman (Prahran − 20 votes)
- Leading goalkicker: Brandon Jackson (UHS-VU − 50 goals)
- Matches played: 94

Prahran won the Division 1 premiership for the first time, defeating Parkside by 14 points in the grand final. Both clubs were promoted to Premier C for the 2025 season, while West Brunswick and Old Yarra Cobras were relegated to Division 2.

=== Ladder ===
Pos	Team	Pld	W	L	D	PF	PA	PP	Pts	Qualification
1	Prahran (P)	18	16	2	0	1507	766	196.7	64	Finals series
2	Parkside	18	13	5	0	1467	927	158.3	52	Finals series
3	Ormond	18	12	6	0	1721	1264	136.2	48	Finals series
4	UHS-VU	18	12	6	0	1383	1078	128.3	48	Finals series
5	Old Peninsula	18	10	8	0	1427	1369	104.2	40	
6	Kew	18	8	9	1	1419	1390	102.1	34	
7	Preston Bullants	18	7	10	1	1171	1367	85.7	30	
8	Therry Penola	18	5	13	0	1003	1579	63.5	20	
9	West Brunswick	18	4	14	0	967	1540	62.8	16	Relegation
10	Old Yarra Cobras	18	2	16	0	914	1699	53.8	8	Relegation

Rules for classification: 1) points; 2) percentage; 3) number of points for.
(P) Premiers

=== Finals ===
2024 VAFA Division 1 Grand Final
Saturday, 14 September (2:30pm)	Prahran	def.	Parkside	Martin Reserve
2.3 (15); 3.3 (21); 3.4 (22); 5.6 (36)	Q1; Q2; Q3; Final	0.2 (2); 0.5 (5); 1.8 (14); 2.10 (22)	Best on ground: Shaun Chapman (Prahran)
S. Chapman 2, M. Mayne, M. Clifford, E. Plaza	Goals	N. Douglas, M. Lawson
S. Chapman, M. Mayne, J. Musster, J. Bell, J. Hume, R. Brodie	Best	D. Douglas, M. Lawson, M. Romano, Y. Stecki, L. Daniels, L. Caldwell

== Division 2 ==
2024 Division 2 season
- Date: 13 April – 14 September 2024
- Teams: 10
- Premiers: Elsternwick; 1st Division 2 premiership
- Minor premiers: Brunswick
- Promoted: Elsternwick; Brunswick
- Relegated: Wattle Park (Note: Although Bulleen Templestowe would have been relegated to Division 3 in 2025, it left the VAFA following the 2024 season, joining the Eastern Football Netball League (EFNL).)
- J Fullerton Medallist: Justin Raiti (Hawthorn − 20 votes)
- Leading goalkicker: Hayden Parker (Brunswick − 76 goals)
- Matches played: 94

Elsternwick won the Division 2 premiership for the first time, defeating minor premiers Brunswick by 13 points in the grand final. It was Elsternwick's second senior premiership in a row, following its Division 3 premiership in 2023. Both clubs were promoted to Division 1 for the 2025 season.

This was Bulleen Templestowe's last season in the VAFA, with the club moving to the Eastern Football Netball League (EFNL) in 2025. Because of this, only one club – Wattle Park – was relegated to Division 3.

=== Ladder ===
Pos	Team	Pld	W	L	D	PF	PA	PP	Pts	Qualification
1	Brunswick	18	15	3	0	1707	1134	150.5	60	Finals series
2	Elsternwick	18	12	5	1	1513	1360	111.3	50	Finals series
3	South Melbourne Districts	18	12	6	0	1459	1195	122.1	48	Finals series
4	Whitefriars	18	11	6	1	1579	1263	125.0	46	Finals series
5	Hawthorn	18	11	7	0	1719	1640	104.8	44	
6	MHSOB	18	7	10	1	1375	1487	92.5	30	
7	St Mary's Salesian	18	6	11	1	1387	1432	96.9	26	
8	Aquinas	18	5	13	0	1266	1673	75.7	20	
9	Wattle Park	18	4	13	1	1147	1437	79.8	18	Relegated to Division 3
10	Bulleen Templestowe	18	4	13	1	1141	1672	68.2	18	Withdrew after end of season

Rules for classification: 1) points; 2) percentage; 3) number of points for.

=== Finals ===
2024 VAFA Division 2 Grand Final
Saturday, 14 September (2:30pm)	Elsternwick	def.	Brunswick	Tony Sheehan Oval
1.5 (11); 3.8 (26); 4.16 (40); 4.17 (41)	Q1; Q2; Q3; Final	0.1 (1); 3.2 (20); 3.4 (22); 3.10 (28)
D. Marchese 3, J. Howard	Goals	W. McKenzie, H. Parker, O. Watt
D. Marchese, M. Harvey, P. Sanderson, J. Hill, B. Pantas, D. Roberts	Best	L. White, T. Haddock, J. Hedley, B. Wilson, T. Hedley, W. McKenzie

== Division 3 ==
2024 Division 3 season
- Date: 13 April − 21 September 2024
- Teams: 11
- Premiers: Canterbury; 1st Division 3 premiership
- Minor premiers: North Brunswick
- Promoted: Canterbury; St John's
- Hutchinson Medallist: Fletcher Banfield (North Brunswick − 29 votes)
- Leading goalkicker: Matthew Carnelley (St John's − 76 goals)
- Matches played: 96

Canterbury won the Division 3 premiership for the first time, defeating St John's by 29 points in the grand final. Both clubs were promoted to Division 2 for the 2025 season.

The merger of Division 4 into Division 3 meant the finals series was expanded to include the top five teams from the home-and-away season instead of the top four.

=== Ladder ===
Pos	Team	Pld	W	L	D	PF	PA	PP	Pts	Qualification
1	North Brunswick	17	15	2	0	1636	710	230.4	60	Finals series
2	St John's	16	14	2	0	2311	824	280.5	56	Finals series
3	Power House	16	13	3	0	1909	926	206.2	52	Finals series
4	Canterbury (P)	17	13	4	0	1851	1056	175.3	52	Finals series
5	Richmond Central	17	10	7	0	1419	1208	117.5	40	Finals series
6	Swinburne University	17	7	10	0	1325	1455	91.1	28	
7	Albert Park	16	6	10	0	1114	1538	72.4	24	
8	Box Hill North	16	4	12	0	1113	1890	58.9	16	
9	La Trobe University	16	3	13	0	955	1327	72.0	12	
10	Eley Park	16	3	13	0	780	2459	31.7	12	
11	Chadstone	16	2	14	0	1049	2069	50.7	8	

Rules for classification: 1) points; 2) percentage; 3) number of points for.
(P) Premiers

=== Finals ===
2024 VAFA Division 3 Grand Final
Saturday, 21 September (2:30pm)	St John's	def. by	Canterbury	Martin Reserve
5.0 (30); 6.0 (36); 9.4 (58); 9.5 (59)	Q1; Q2; Q3; Final	4.6 (30); 5.13 (43); 6.16 (52); 11.22 (88)
C. Houghton 2, B. Ayache, H. Emery, B. Khoweiss, T. Neal, J. Rudd, B. Robson, M. Barry	Goals	J. Nicolopoulos 4, B. Kelleher 3, J. Cutts 2, J. Boarotto, R. almsley
C. Houghton, J. Mourant, C. Ely, J. D'Atri, B. Robson, M. Barry	Best	T. Lowden, B. Kelleher, J. Nicolopoulos, J. Boarotto, M. Szabo, N. Beacom

== See also ==
- 2024 VAFA Women's season
