= William O'Halloran (cricketer) =

Australian cricketer (1934–1994)

Personal information
- Full name: William Matthew O'Halloran
- Born: 12 June 1934; Corowa, New South Wales
- Died: 13 December 1994 (aged 60); Melbourne, Victoria
- Batting: Left-handed
- Bowling: Right-arm medium

Domestic team information
- Years: Team
- 1962/63–1963/64: Victoria
- Source: Cricinfo, 4 December 2015

William Matthew O'Halloran (18 June 1934 – 13 December 1994) was an Australian cricketer. He played six first-class cricket matches for Victoria between 1962 and 1964.

== Family ==
The son of Tom O'Halloran, and the (later) Mrs. C.S. Hayes, William Matthew O'Halloran was born at Corowa, in New South Wales on 18 June 1934.

He married Joan Beverley Rowland (1936–2021) in 1957.

== Education ==
=== Caulfield Grammar School ===
He attended Caulfield Grammar School from 1950 to 1953, where he excelled as both a cricketer and as a footballer.

He later returned to the school as a member of staff: teaching there from 1958 to 1959, and from 1963 to 1966.

=== Melbourne University ===
He attended the University of Melbourne from 1954 to 1956. He graduated Bachelor of Commerce (B.Comm) on 20 March 1957.

== Football ==
He played amateur football for Old Caulfield Grammarians in the Victorian Amateur Football Association (VAFA) over many seasons; and was named as an interchange in the club's "Team of the Century".

== Cricket ==
=== Intervarsity cricket ===
In December 1956 he played for Melbourne University against Adelaide University, taking 6/41.

=== District cricket ===
A left-hand bat, and a right arm medium-pace bowler, he played in 218 First XI District Cricket matches, with St Kilda (192 games) and University (26 games) over 21 seasons — 1953/54 to 1973/74 — scoring 5,368 runs (av. 30.32) and taking 312 wickets (at 17.34).

=== Representative cricket ===
He also played in six representative matches for Victoria, scoring 115 runs (av. 12.77) and taking 4 wickets (at 50.50) — in one of those matches taking 2/26 — over two consecutive cricket seasons: 1962/1963, and 1963/1964.

==== 1962/1963 ====
- 1962: Victoria vs. M.C.C., MCG, December 1962.
- 1962: Victoria vs. New South Wales, MCG, December 1962.
- 1963: Victoria vs. South Australia, Adelaide Oval, January 1962.
- 1963: Victoria vs. Western Australia, WACA, Perth, January 1962.

==== 1963/1964 ====
- 1963: Victoria vs. South Australia, MCG, November 1963.
- 1963: Victoria vs. Western Australia, MCG, November 1963.

== See also ==
- List of Victoria first-class cricketers
- List of Caulfield Grammar School people
