= 1921 MAFA season =

26th season of the Metropolitan Amateur Football Association

- Date: 7 May − 3 September 1921
- Teams: 14
- Premiers: University B 1st premiership
- Minor premiers: University A 1st minor premiership

The 1921 MAFA season was the 26th season of the Metropolitan Amateur Football Association (MAFA), an Australian rules football competition played in the state of Victoria. The season began on 7 May and concluded on 3 September, comprising a 13-match home-and-away season, followed by a two-week finals series.

University B won the MAFA premiership for the first time, defeating University A by five points in the 1921 MAFA Grand Final.

== Association membership ==
Six new teams entered the MAFA in 1921 – Hampton, Old Brightonians, Old Scotch Collegians, Old Trinity, Sandringham and University A.

University A joined the MAFA after leaving the Victorian Junior Football League (VJFL). They joined the University Football Club's other team, University B, which had crossed from the VJFL in 1920. The teams were known as the "Blues" and the "Blacks" respectively, although the nicknames were not formally used until 1930.

== Ladder ==
Pos	Team	Pld	W	L	D	Pts	Qualification
1	University A	13				44	Finals series
2	University B (P)	13				44	Finals series
3	Hampton	13				44	Finals series
4	Old Melburnians	13				40	Finals series
5	Elsternwick	13				36	
6	Sandringham	13				32	
7	Old Scotch	13				28	
8	Collegians	13				24	
9	Old Caulfield Grammarians	13				20	
10	South Yarra	13				16	
11	Melbourne Swimming Club	13				12	
12	Old Trinity	13				8	
13	Teachers College	13				4	
14	Old Brightonians	13	0			0	

(P) Premiers

== Finals ==
=== Semi-finals ===
	Semi-finals
Saturday, 13 August	University B 10.12 (72)	def.	Hampton 8.6 (54)	Melbourne Grammar School
Saturday, 13 August	University A 18.19 (127)	def.	Old Melburnians 5.9 (39)	Old Scotch Oval

=== Grand Final ===
1921 MAFA Grand Final
Saturday, 3 September	University A	def. by	University B	University Oval
9.8 (62)	Q1; Q2; Q3; Final	9.13 (67)
Cook 6, Morrison, Howells, Rush	Goals	Flemming 3, Taylor 2, Grounds 2, Lennon, Hasker
Howells, Richardson, Lockwood, Ross, Rush, Stephens	Best	Orchard, Dunn, Lennon, McClean, Grounds
While the grand final would have ordinarily been held on 20 August (one week after the semi-final), it was delayed by three weeks until students from the University of Melbourne returned from holidays.

== Notable events ==
- The MAFA sent a delegation to a meeting of the Protestant Churches Football Association to form a "union of junior leagues". Ultimately, the MAFA declined to join, stating it no longer considered itself a "junior association" (having renamed itself from the "Metropolitan Junior Football Association" in 1912). (Note: In 1900, the Metropolitan Junior Football Association (MJFA, now VAFA) decided on a change of name to the Metropolitan Football Association (MFA). MJFA president Lawrence Adamson brokered a deal that the existing MFA (of 1899) became the MJFA, giving his MJFA (of 1892) the "Metropolitan Football Association" name. Despite this, various newspaper reports from 1900 until 1912 still use the MJFA name when referring to Adamson's competition, most consensus is that "MJFA" in this time period refers to the now-VAFA, and the VAFA's official history continues to use the MJFA name until 1912.)
