= Andy Brannan =

Australian rules footballer

Personal information
- Full name: Anthony William Bramwell Brannan
- Born: 4 June 1919; Richmond, Victoria
- Died: 13 February 1997 (aged 77)
- Original team: Malvern
- Height: 164 cm (5 ft 5 in)
- Weight: 55 kg (121 lb)

Playing career^{1}
Years	Club	Games (Goals)
1942–1943	Richmond	19 (29)
1944–1946	Hawthorn	31 (39)
Total		50 (68)
- ^{1} Playing statistics correct to the end of 1946.

Anthony William Bramwell "Andy" Brannan (4 June 1919 – 13 February 1997) was an Australian rules footballer who played for the Richmond Football Club and Hawthorn Football Club in the Victorian Football League (VFL). He later served as the inaugural coach of the ANZ Bank Football Club in the Victorian Amateur Football Association (VAFA) from 1954 until the end of the 1955 season.
