= Albert Park Football Club =

Names
- Full name: Albert Park Football and Netball Club
- Nickname: Falcons
- Former nickname(s): Zedders, Rats

2024 season
- After finals: VAFA: N/A; VAFAW: 3rd
- Home-and-away season: VAFA: 7th VAFAW: 3rd
- Leading goalkicker: VAFA: Jack Lee (29); VAFAW: Johannah Griffin (29)
- Best and fairest: VAFA: Henry Olive; VAFAW: Johannah Griffin

Club details
- Founded: 1954; 72 years ago
- Colours: Red Blue
- Competition: VAFA: Division 3 VAFAW: Division 4
- President: Enver Krasnic
- Coach: VAFA: Jack Amies; VAFAW: Anthony DeJong
- Captain(s): VAFA: Alex 'Alby' Evans & Alastair Lupo; VAFAW: Emma Calvert & Jessica Newitt
- Ground: Oval 20, Beaurepaire Pavilion, Albert Park

Uniforms
Home

The Albert Park Football Club, nicknamed the Falcons, is an Australian rules football club based in the Melbourne suburb of Albert Park. The club currently holds the record for longest senior premiership drought in the Victorian Amateur Football Association (VAFA), winning just three reserves grand finals since it was founded in 1954.

As of 2024, Albert Park's men's team competes in Division 3 of the VAFA, while the women's team is in Division 3 of the VAFA Women's (VAFAW)

== History ==
=== Early years ===
Colours of ANZ Bank

Albert Park was founded in 1954 as the ANZ Bank Football Club, nicknamed the Zedders. The club was founded by sports-minded officers at the head office of ANZ Bank, who negotiated a place in the VAFA's E Section, with the club's first home ground located at Yarra Bend Park in Fairfield. The club initially was composed entirely of players who worked at the bank, and former Richmond and Hawthorn footballer Andy Brannan served as the inaugural coach.

The Zedders made their first grand final in 1958, although they lost to St Kilda CBC Old Boys by 13 points. They were promoted for the first time to D Section in 1959, but were relegated back down to E Section after only a single win in 1966. The club won its first premiership in 1969 with a 12-point victory over Brunswick in the reserves grand final.

=== ES&A and National Bank ===
The ES&A Bank Football Club was formed in 1932 and entered the Metropolitan Amateur Football Association (MAFA, now VAFA) the same year. Likewise, the National Bank Football Club was also formed in 1932 and also entered the MAFA the same year. The clubs were linked to the English, Scottish & Australian Bank and National Australia Bank respectively.

In 1936, the clubs entered into a brief merger and competed as ES&A−National Bank until the end of the 1937 season. After World War II ended, the administration of both banks issues a directive to reform the clubs, with ES&A returning in 1952 and National Bank returning in 1954.

National Bank continued competing until it disbanded at the end of the 1979 season.

=== Merger and new name ===
At the end of the 1969 season, ES&A Bank was absorbed by ANZ Bank, which was followed by the banks themselves merging in October 1970. ANZ Bank won its second reserves premiership in 1974, defeating Old Geelong in E Section. The club made its second senior grand final in 1991, but were defeated by Elsternwick by 10 points.

In 1991, ANZ Bank faced rival club Elsternwick in the F Section grand final. Although they were "so heavily favoured to win that they hired marquees", Elsternwick won by ten points.

Ahead of the 1996 season, the club decided to change its name to the ANZ Albert Park Football Club, nicknamed the Rats. The decision was made amid difficulty in fielding teams, increasing interest from the local community in Albert Park and ANZ Bank withdrawing support.

The club removed any reference to ANZ Bank from its name in 1999 and became known simply as "Albert Park", nicknamed the "Falcons" (although the "Rats" nickname lasted informally for several years). The club was runners-up in the F Section grand final later that year, going down to Eley Park by 14 points.

Albert Park's most recent premiership, as of 2024, was in 2002, when they defeated Werribee in the D4 Section reserves grand final.

The club introduced its first netball teams in 2015.

== Club song ==
=== Current song ===
The club's song is sung to the tune of Victory March, the same as the song of the Sydney Swans.

Cheer, Cheer the Red and the Blue
We'll keep on fighting all the game through
Soaring to Success we fly
Shake down the thunder from the sky
Whether the odds are great or be small
The Falcs from the Park will win overall
While our loyal falcs are marching
Onwards to victory

=== ANZ Albert Park song ===
The club used similar lyrics and the same tune when it was known as ANZ Albert Park.

Cheer, cheer the red and the blue
We'll give our best the whole game through
Lift that noble banner high
Shake down the thunder from the sky
Whether the odds be great or small
The rats from the park will win over all
While the loyal sons are marching
Onwards to victory

=== ANZ Bank song ===
ANZ Bank's club song was sung to an unknown tune.

Beat them all, beat them all
The bigger the harder they fall
We'll beat the high teams and we'll beat the low
We'll beat the lot of them cause they all know
That we’re going to "D" Grade next year
And there's not a team we will fear
We'll thrash our opponents and then have our moments
So drink up your beer down them all

=== ES&A Bank song ===
ES&A Bank's club song was sung to an unknown tune, although some of the lyrics were similar to the Melbourne Football Club's song.

We are the red and green forever
The team of the ES&A
We're out just for recreation
To pass the time away
We'll fight for honour and for glory
And to victory for our team
Should old acquaintance be forgotten
Keep your eyes on the red and the green
