= Fred Turnbull (Australian footballer) =

Australian rules footballer (1884–1947)

Personal information
- Full name: Frederick Phipps Walter Turnbull
- Born: 4 February 1884; Fitzroy, Victoria
- Died: 16 August 1947 (aged 63); Highett, Victoria
- Original team: Brighton (VFA)
- Height: 182 cm (6 ft 0 in)

Playing career^{1}
Years	Club	Games (Goals)	
1915, 1918	St Kilda	8 (2)	

Coaching career
Years	Club	Games (W–L–D)	
1914–1915	Brighton (VFA)		

Umpiring career
Years	League	Role	Games
1923	VFL	Field umpire	1
- ^{1} Playing statistics correct to the end of 1918.

Frederick Phipps Walter "Fred" Turnbull (4 February 1884 – 16 August 1947) was an Australian rules footballer who played with Brunswick, Prahran, and Brighton in the Victorian Football Association (VFA), and with St Kilda in the Victorian Football League (VFL). He also coached both the VFA club Brighton, and the VAFA club Caulfield Grammarians Football Club.

== Family ==
The son of John Morier Turnbull (1845–1907) and Mary Jane Turnbull (née Macey) (1846–21 August 1928), he was born on 4 February 1884 (one of, perhaps, as many as fourteen children born alive). He married Adelena Esther Frances "Lena" Mathews (1884-) on 10 August 1904.

He was divorced from her, and granted custody of their one-year-old child, on the grounds of her "infidelity" (at the time of the hearing his occupation was given as "nightwatchman"); Turnbull's older brother, Sydney Alexander Duncan Turnbull (1880-) — the father of Lena'a second child, Gladys Victoria Alice Turnbull, born in 1907 — was cited as the correspondent (and had costs awarded against him).

Fred married Isabel Walker (1895–1967) in 1917.

He died on 16 August 1947.

== Football ==
=== Player ===
==== VFA ====
He played with VFA team Brunswick in 1909 and 1910. He successfully requested a transfer to Prahran in 1910, and was a regular team member for the 1910 season.

He transferred to Brighton in 1911. In 1911, Turnbull was reported for striking Essendon Association player Dave McNamara in the 29 July 1911 Essendon v. Brighton match; the tribunal found him guilty and suspended him for 12 months. He was Brighton's captain in 1914, 1915 and, after playing for St Kilda, he returned to Brighton and played in the 1920 season.

==== VFL ====
Recruited directly from Brighton in mid-season, he played seven senior matches for St Kilda in 1915, making his debut, aged 31, kicking one goal, in St Kilda's 12.17 (89) to 8.7 (55) victory over Geelong in round 11, at the Junction Oval, on 3 July 1915. He played six more senior games that season. He played one more senior game for St Kilda, aged 34, against Essendon, on 18 May 1918 (due to the war, St Kilda did not compete in the VFL competition in either 1916 or 1917).

=== Coach ===
==== VFA ====
He coached VFA team Brighton in 1914, and 1915.

==== MAFA ====
He coached the (then) Old Caulfield Grammarians to a premiership win in B Grade of the (then) Metropolitan Amateur Football Association in 1925.

=== Umpire ===
He umpired a single VFL senior match in 1923: the round 7 match, between Melbourne and Essendon at the M.C.G, on 16 June 1923. His performance as a field umpire drew some criticism.
