= David Mirra =

Australian rules footballer (born 1991)

- Mirra coaching Box Hill in 2026

Personal information
- Born: 20 March 1991 (age 35)
- Original team: Box Hill (VFL)
- Draft: No. 23, 2018 rookie draft
- Debut: Round 4, 2018, Hawthorn vs. Melbourne, at Melbourne Cricket Ground
- Height: 186 cm (6 ft 1 in)
- Weight: 89 kg (196 lb)
- Position: Defender

Playing career^{1}
Years	Club	Games (Goals)
2018–2019	Hawthorn	11 (0)
- ^{1} Playing statistics correct to the end of 2019.

Career highlights
- Playing: 2× VFL premiership player: 2013 (c), 2018; Norm Goss Memorial Medal: 2018; 2× Box Hill best and fairest: 2016, 2019; 3× VFL Representative: 2013, 2014, 2016; 4× VFL Team of the Year: 2011, 2013, 2014, 2015; VAFA Premier leading goalkicker: 2023; Coaching: VFL Premiership coach: 2026

David Mirra (born 20 March 1991) is an Australian rules football coach and former player who currently serves as the senior coach of the Box Hill Hawks in the Victorian Football League (VFL). He previously played for Box Hill and served as the club's captain, in addition to playing professionally for the Hawthorn Football Club in the Australian Football League (AFL).

== VFL career ==
As a young player who was no longer eligible for junior football, Mirra joined the Box Hill in the Victorian Football League (VFL) in 2010. In his first season with the club, he played just one senior game, spending the rest of the season playing in the development team which won the premiership. From 2011 onward, Mirra was a regular senior player for Box Hill. He became a solid and dependable defender and had been selected for the VFL in state representative matches on three occasions. In 2013, Mirra led Box Hill to a grand final win after club captain, Daniel Pratt, was unable to play because of injury. He has been named in the VFL team of the year four times and won the club best and fairest in 2016 having previously been runner-up on four occasions.

To the end of the 2019 season; Mirra has played 155 senior games for Box Hill and captained the side for four seasons from 2014 to 2017. He has captained the Box Hill Hawks in 78 matches, a club record.

== AFL career ==
Mirra was drafted by Hawthorn with their second selection and twenty-third overall in the 2018 rookie draft. He made his AFL debut in the sixty-seven point win against Melbourne at the Melbourne Cricket Ground in round four of the 2018 season. Mirra played 7 games in his debut season including the semi-final loss to Melbourne. He was promoted to the main list at the end of the season. Mirra played four games in his second season before getting delisted at the end of the year.

== Statistics ==
Legend
G	Goals	K	Kicks	D	Disposals	T	Tackles
B	Behinds	H	Handballs	M	Marks

Season	Team	No.	Games	Totals							Averages (per game)							Votes
Season	Team	No.	Games	G	B	K	H	D	M	T	G	B	K	H	D	M	T	Votes
2018	Hawthorn	32	7	0	0	77	38	115	40	10	0.0	0.0	11.0	5.4	16.4	5.7	1.4	0
2019	Hawthorn	32	4	0	0	46	24	70	23	12	0.0	0.0	11.5	6.0	17.5	5.8	3.0	0
Career			11	0	0	123	62	185	63	22	0.0	0.0	11.2	5.6	16.8	5.7	2.0	0

== Honours and achievements ==
=== Playing ===
Team

- 2× VFL premiership player (Box Hill): 2013, 2018
- Minor premiership (Box Hill): 2015

Individual

- VFL premiership captain: 2013
- Norm Goss Memorial Medal: 2018
- 2× Col Austen Trophy: 2016, 2019
- 3× VFL Representative: 2013, 2014, 2016
- 4× VFL Team of the Year: 2011, 2013, 2014, 2015

=== Coaching ===
- VFL Premiership coach (Box Hill): 2026
