= Grand Slam Oval =

Sporting venue in Melbourne, Victoria

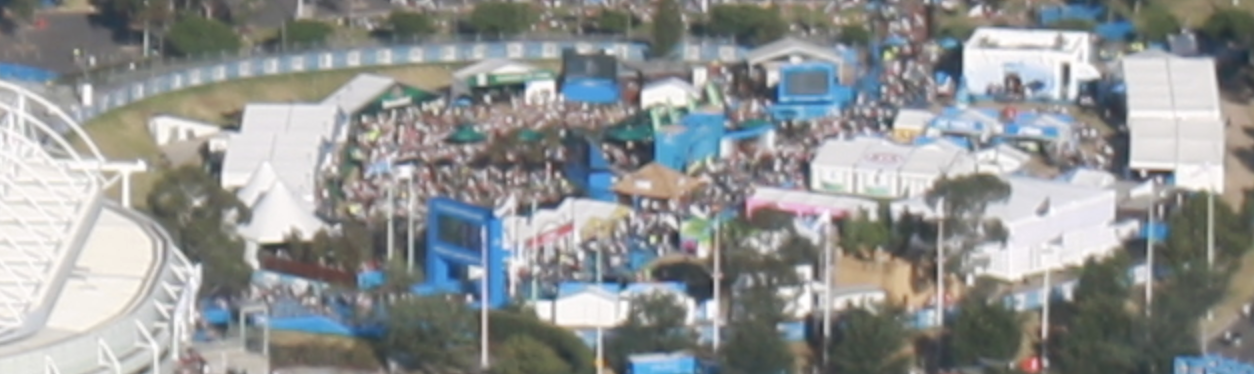
- Interactive map of Grand Slam Oval
- Location: Melbourne Park, Melbourne
- Coordinates: 37.82270°S 144.97989°E
- Record attendance: 20,000 (Livid festival, 19 October 2002)

Construction
- Opened: 1871; 155 years ago

Tenant
- Old Scotch Football Club (1921–1992)

Grand Slam Oval (sometimes referred to as Melbourne Park Oval or simply The Oval) is a sporting venue located within Melbourne Park in the Melbourne Sports and Entertainment Precinct. It was previously an Australian rules football and cricket ground, which was known for much of its history as the Old Scotch Oval (or the Yarra Park Oval). Since the late 1990s, the oval has been used for events, including concerts and festivals.

== History ==
Melbourne Park Oval was established in 1871 as the Civil Service Football Ground (or Civil Service Cricket Ground) after members of the Victorian Civil Service purchased seven acres of land in Yarra Park, located near the Melbourne Cricket Ground (MCG) and the Friendly Societies' Ground. A pavilion and fence was built on the site shortly after.

The inaugural intercolonial football match between the Victorian Football Association (VFA) and the South Australian Football Association (SAFA) was scheduled to be played at the ground in July 1877, but it was cancelled because a suitable date could not be agreed upon.

In July 1879, Scotch College purchased the ground with the approval of Victorian lands minister Francis Longmore, and it was subsequently renamed to the Scotch College Cricket Ground. One of the earliest organised soccer matches in Victoria was played at the ground on 31 March 1883.

On 15 April 1921, the Old Scotch Football Club was formed and entered the Metropolitan Amateur Football Association (MAFA) – later renamed the Victorian Amateur Football Association (VAFA) – the same year. The original Old Haileybury Football Club played its home games at the ground in the 1920s and 1930s.

In 1926, the MAFA and the Department of Education formally applied for joint permissive occupancy of the ground, which was known as Old Scotch Oval by this point.

Some VAFA finals matches were played at Old Scotch Oval. Additionally, the ground was used for Victorian Football League (VFL) reserves matches. VFL clubs Melbourne and Richmond both occasionally held training sessions at the ground.

In the 1980s, the Victorian state government, under then-premier John Cain, sought to establish a new tennis centre which would replace Kooyong Stadium as the venue of the Australian Open. During the 1987 VAFA season, Old Xaverians advised that car parking would be limited because of construction near the oval. The National Tennis Centre (later renamed to Rod Laver Arena) was opened alongside the newly-developed Flinders Park precinct on 11 January 1988.

The second stage of the new tennis centre saw the construction of the Melbourne Multi Purpose Venue (later renamed to John Cain Arena). In 1992, Old Scotch moved from the oval to the Camberwell Sports Ground, although some VAFA matches were scheduled to be played at the oval during the 1992 season. Flinders Park was renamed Melbourne Park in 1996.

Cricket matches continued to be played at Old Scotch Oval throughout the 1990s. The Melbourne Cricket Club's third and fourth grade sides played their final matches at the ground in early 1999. After this, Old Scotch Oval was used for events, including the Cirque du Soleil in March 1999.

In May 2021, the venue was officially renamed Grand Slam Oval.
