= Old Scotch Football Club =

Names
- Full name: Old Scotch Football Club
- Former name: Old Scotch Collegians Football Club (1921−2003)
- Nickname(s): VAFA: Cardinals; VAFAW: Stars

2025 season
- After finals: VAFA: 2nd VAFAW: 1st
- Home-and-away season: VAFA: 4th of 10; VAFAW: 2nd of 9

Club details
- Founded: 15 April 1921; 104 years ago
- Colours: Red Gold Navy
- Competition: VAFA: Premier; VAFAW: Premier
- President: Will Strange
- Coach: VAFA: Mark Gnatt; VAFAW: Dean Anderson
- Captain(s): VAFA: Andy Jelbart; VAFAW: TBA
- Premierships: VAFA (13): 1923; 1924; 1926; 1927; 1931; 1932; 1933; 1934; 1965; 1970; 1977; 1978; 2024; VAFAW (3): 2019; 2024; 2025
- Ground: Camberwell Sports Ground

Other information
- Official website: oldscotchfc.com.au

The Old Scotch Football Club, nicknamed the Cardinals, is an Australian rules football club based in the Melbourne suburb of Camberwell. It is affiliated with the Old Scotch Collegians Association and maintains a close relationship with Scotch College.

Old Scotch has competed in the top division of the Victorian Amateur Football Association (VAFA) for 72 out of a possible 88 years, the most of any club. The club has never competed lower than the Premier B division, and also held a 35-year continuous playing record in A Section/Premier Division until 2015.

== History ==
In 1894, the Scotch Collegians Football Club entered the Metropolitan Junior Football Association (MJFA). The club finished sixth in its inaugural season, and competed again in 1895, but disbanded prior to the start of the 1896 season.

The present-day club was formed on 15 April 1921 as the Old Scotch Collegians Football Club, entering the renamed Metropolitan Amateur Football Association (MAFA) the same year. The club won back-to-back premierships in 1923 and 1924, were runners-up in 1925, then again went back-to-back in 1926 and 1927.

Old Scotch went back-to-back with a B Section premiership in 1977 and an A Section premiership in 1978. The club moved its home ground from Old Scotch Oval to Camberwell Sports Ground in 1992. The club were runners-up to Old Xaverians in 1997 and 1998.

The club changed its name from Old Scotch Collegians to "Old Scotch Football Club" in 2003.

At the end of the 2015 season, Old Scotch was relegated after finishing ninth and entered B Section/Premier B for the first time since 1980. They lost to Beaumaris in the 2016 preliminary final, but made the 2017 grand final and were promoted back to Premier Division in 2018. The club also introduced its first women's team, the Old Scotch Stars, for the 2018 VAFA Women's season.

In 2024, Old Scotch broke its 46-year men's senior premiership drought with an 18-point victory over Old Brighton in the Premier Division grand final. It was the second senior premiership won in 2024, with the club also claiming its first Premier Division premiership in the VAFAW.

== Honours ==
=== Premierships ===
Competition	Division	Level	Wins	Years won
Victorian Amateur Football Association	Premier	Seniors	10	1923, 1924, 1926, 1927, 1931, 1932, 1933, 1934, 1978, 2024
Victorian Amateur Football Association	Premier B	Seniors	3	1965, 1970, 1977
VAFA Women's	Premier	Seniors	1	2024
VAFA Women's	Division 1	Seniors	1	2019

=== Minor premierships ===
Competition	Division	Level	Wins	Years won
Victorian Amateur Football Association	Premier	Seniors		1925, 1926, 1927, 1928

== Club song ==
The club song is sung to the tune of "Jingle Bells".

Old Scotch, Old Scotch winners all the way
We always play good football, on any sort of day...hey!
Be it fine, be it wet, mud is everywhere
Whenever there’s a game to win
the Scotchies will be there!

== Seasons ==
Premiers	Grand Finalist	Minor premiers	Finals appearance	Wooden spoon	Division leading goalkicker	Division best and fairest

=== Men's ===
==== Seniors ====
Year	League	Division	Finish	W	L	D	Coach	Captain	Best and fairest	Leading goalkicker		Ref
1921	MAFA		7th									
1922	MAFA	A Section	3rd									
1923	MAFA	A Section	2nd									
1924	MAFA	A Section	3rd	10	4	0						
1925	MAFA	A Section	1st									
1926	MAFA	A Section	1st	16	2	0						
1927	MAFA	A Section	1st	16	2	0						
1928	MAFA	A Section	3rd	16	1	1						
1929	MAFA	A Section	1st									
2024	VAFA	Premier	3rd	12	6	0	Mark Gnatt	Andy Jelbart	Charlie Cormack	Ryan Valentine	38	
