= Old Brighton Grammarians Football Club =

Australian rules football club

Old Brighton Grammarians

Names
- Full name: Old Brighton Grammarians Football Club
- Nickname: Tonners
- Former nickname(s): Club XVIII: Bloods, Warriors

2025 season
- After finals: VAFA: 1st VAFAW: 1st
- Home-and-away season: VAFA: 1st of 10; VAFAW: 1st of 9

Club details
- Founded: 1957; 69 years ago
- Colours: Red Navy blue
- Competition: VAFA: Premier; VAFAW: Premier B
- Coach: VAFA: Marcel Bruin; VAFAW: Andrew Grant
- Captain(s): VAFA: Harry Hill; VAFAW: Cat O'Brien & India Tait
- Premierships: VAFA (6): 1977; 1980; 1997; 2013; 2017; 2025; VAFAW (2): 2024; 2025
- Ground: Brighton Beach Oval

Uniforms
Home

Other information
- Official website: obgfc.com.au

The Old Brighton Grammarians Football Club, nicknamed the Tonners, is an Australian rules football club based in the Melbourne suburb of Brighton. The club maintains a close relationship with Brighton Grammar School.

Old Brighton has won six senior premierships since it was formed in 1957, including its first top division (A Section/Premier Division) grand final in the Victorian Amateur Football Association (VAFA) in 2025. It also finished runners-up in 2007 and 2024.

As of 2026, Old Brighton's men's and women's teams compete in the Premier Division of the VAFA and VAFAW, respectively.

== History ==
=== Origins ===
The Old Brightonians Football Club was formed in 1921 and entered the Metropolitan Amateur Football Association (MAFA, later VAFA) the same year. Owing to the difficulty of maintaining a strong team, the club failed to win a single game and withdrew prior to the start of the 1922 season.

In 1924, the club returned to the MAFA, but only lasted two years and withdrew prior to the start of the 1927 season. Another return came in 1932, but the club disbanded in 1939 in the early stages of World War II and did not compete in the 1940 VAFA season.

=== Present-day club ===
The present-day Old Brighton Grammarians Football Club was reformed in 1957 and entered the VAFA's E Section the same year. The club was promoted to D Section after a loss to Preston in the 1959 E Section grand final, and eventually won its first premiership with a 62-point victory over Alphington in the 1977 D Section grand final.

In 1980, Old Brighton introduced a team (nicknamed the "Warriors") into the VAFA Club XVIII social competition. The side disbanded at the end of the 1987 season, but briefly returned for the 1995 season. In 1996, the Warriors merged with the Bloods Football Club (which was formed in 1987) and competed as the Old Brighton Bloods for several years.

The club entered its first women's team in the inaugural VAFA Women's season in 2017, finishing sixth on the Division 1 ladder.

Old Brighton's first A Section/Premier Division grand final was in 2007, where they lost to Old Xaverians. A second top division grand final came in 2024, but the club lost by 18 points to Old Scotch.

As of 2019, the club's number-one ticket holders were then-Liberal MP Tim Wilson and former Bayside mayor Felicity Frederico.

== Honours ==
=== Premierships ===
Competition	Division	Level	Wins	Years won
Victorian Amateur Football Association	Premier	Seniors	1	2025
Victorian Amateur Football Association	Premier B	Seniors	3	1997, 2013, 2017
Victorian Amateur Football Association	Premier C	Seniors	1	1980
Victorian Amateur Football Association	Division 1	Seniors	1	1977
VAFA Women's	Premier B	Seniors	1	2025
VAFA Women's	Division 1	Seniors	1	2024

== Club song ==
The club song is sung to the tune of George M. Cohan's 1906 song "You're a Grand Old Flag", and is the same song that the Melbourne Football Club uses.

It's a grand old flag, it's a high flying flag,
It's the emblem for me and for you,
It's the emblem of the team we love,
The team of the Red and the Blue.

Every heart beats true, for the Red and the Blue,
And we sing this song to you,
Should old acquaintance be forgot,
Keep your eye on the Red and the Blue.

Old Brighton's Club XVIII team, the Warriors, also had an unofficial song in 1987 which was sung to the tune of "Advance Australia Fair".

Old Brighton's sons let us rejoice, for the footy season's back you see.
With cans in our hands and [censored], a flag's our destiny,
We'll sink more beers and kick more goals, a few may get a shag...
Old Brighton couldn't keep us there, we were too good they found,
So on one dark and stormy night they kicked us off our ground,
We'll kick more goals and drink more beers...
