= Old Haileybury Football Club =

Old Haileyburians

Names
- Full name: Old Haileybury Amateur Football Club
- Nickname(s): Men's: Bloods; Women's: Hearts

2025 season
- Home-and-away season: VAFA: 5th VAFAW: 9th

Club details
- Founded: 1961; 65 years ago
- Colours: Magenta Black
- Competition: VAFA: Premier; VAFAW: Division 1
- Coach: VAFA: Daniel Ward; VAFAW: Sean Brady
- Premierships: VAFA (9): 1963; 1969; 1989; 1990; 1995; 2006; 2015; 2017; 2022; 2024; VAFAW (1): 2018
- Ground: Princes Park

Uniforms
Home

Other information
- Official website: oldhaileyburyafc.com.au

The Old Haileybury Football Club (also known as Old Haileyburians), nicknamed the Bloods, is an Australian rules football club based in the Melbourne suburb of Caulfield South. The club was originally associated with Haileybury College and remains sponsored by the school.

Since its founding in 1961, Old Haileybury have won ten Victorian Amateur Football Association (VAFA) senior premierships, including the A-Grade premiership in 2006.

As of 2025, the club's men's team competes in the Premier Division of the VAFA, while the women's team is in Division 1 of the VAFA Women's (VAFAW).

== History ==
=== Origins ===
The original Old Haileybury Football Club was formed in 1925 and joined the Metropolitan Amateur Football Association (MAFA, now VAFA). However, because of poor performance, it entered a merger with Old Trinity to form the Old Haileybury-Trinity Football Club in 1928. By 1934, Old Haileybury-Trinity had dissolved after only a single finals appearance shared between the merged team and its preceding clubs.

=== Modern club ===
The current incarnation of the Old Haileybury Football Club entered the VAFA's E Section (now known as Division 2) in 1961. The club played their first match its former partners Old Trinity, winning by 50 points. Success came early, with Old Haileybury promoted to D Section in 1962 and winning the premiership in that grade in 1963.

Old Haileybury maintained a position of success in D Section but struggled in the C Section, making it a yo-yo club for the remainder of the 1960s. In 1969, the Bloods secured another D Section premiership, which saw it solidify a position C Section club for the next two decades, achieving promotion to B Section only once in this time.

In 1989, the Bloods won its first C Section premiership, going on to win back-to-back grand finals with a B Section premiership in 1990. Further success came in 1995 with another B Section premiership, before the club won its first A Section premiership in 2006 against Old Xaverians.

Old Haileybury entered the inaugural season of the VAFA Women's (VAFAW) competition in 2017, with the team nicknamed the Hearts.

== Notable VFL/AFL players ==
=== Original club ===
- Johnny Jennings
- Luke Trainor

=== Modern club ===
- Harry Armstrong
- Lawrence Bingham
- David Code
- Paul Corrigan
- Stewart Loewe (2006 premiership winner and former coach)
- Simon Meehan (former coach)
- Garry Phillips
- Wayne Shand

== Honours ==
=== Premierships ===
Competition	Division	Wins	Years won
Victorian Amateur Football Association	Premier A	1	2006
Victorian Amateur Football Association	Premier B	4	1990, 1995, 2022, 2024
Victorian Amateur Football Association	Premier C	3	1989, 2015, 2017
Victorian Amateur Football Association	Division 1	2	1963, 1969
VAFA Women's	Premier B	1	2018
