= Elsternwick Amateur Football Club =

Elsternwick Football Club

Names
- Full name: Elsternwick Amateur Football Club
- Former name: Elsternwick Football Club (1906–1912)
- Nickname: Wickers

2024 season
- After finals: VAFA: 1st VAFAW: N/A
- Home-and-away season: VAFA: 2nd VAFAW: 10th
- Leading goalkicker: VAFA: Spencer Hankin (65); VAFAW: Nicola Berto (5)
- Best and fairest: VAFA: TBC; VAFAW: TBC

Club details
- Founded: 1906; 120 years ago
- Colours: Black Red
- Competition: VAFA: Division 1 VAFAW: Division 4
- Coach: VAFA: Peter Higginbotham; VAFAW: Emily Avery
- Premierships: VAFA (8): 1920; 1925; 1939; 1951; 1991; 2005; 2023; 2024
- Ground: Holmes-Todd Oval

Uniforms
Home

Other information
- Official website: elsternwickafc.online

The Elsternwick Amateur Football Club, nicknamed the Wickers, is an Australian rules football club based in the Melbourne suburb of Brighton. It is the oldest district club in the Victorian Amateur Football Association (VAFA) and has played in all seven senior divisions since joining the competition in 1914.

As of 2025, the club's men's team competes in Division 1 of the VAFA, while the women's team is in Division 4 of the VAFA Women's (VAFAW).

== History ==
The Elsternwick Football Club was formed in 1906 and first competed in the Commonwealth Football Association (CFA). It was a founding member of the Federal Football Association (FFA) in 1909, finishing fifth on the ladder in the competition's inaugural season. The club moved to the Melbourne District Football Association (MDFA) in 1911 and changed its name to the "Elsternwick Amateur Football Club" in 1912, before returning to the FFA in 1913.

In 1914, the club moved to the Metropolitan Amateur Football Association (MAFA, later VAFA). It won its first premiership in 1920 (the first MAFA season to be held following World War I), which was followed by a second senior premiership in 1925. The club had a substantial supporter base and player availability at this time, meaning it was able to field a second team (sometimes referred to as Elsternwick B) in the MAFA's newly-formed B Section between 1923 and 1926. The club also received an offer from Victorian Football League (VFL) club St Kilda to have a delegate's position on its own committee – with the possibility of entering into a reserves affiliation – but Elsternwick denied it on the basis of not wanting to be consumed by a senior VFL club.

Elsternwick won a third senior premiership in B Section in 1939, but when the competition resumed in 1946 after World War II, the club began to struggle. This was attributed to European migrants settling in Melbourne after the war, many of whom preferred soccer, which made it hard for Elsternwick to continue recruiting local players.

In July 1980, the VAFA discovered that Elsternwick had fielded a player under an assumed identity, which resulted in the club's secretary being suspended for five years and the coach having his permit revoked.

Elsternwick planned to enter its first women's team in 2020, but the season was cancelled because of the impact of the COVID-19 pandemic. The club was able to enter the VAFA Women's (VAFAW) in Division 4 for the curtailed 2021 season.

== Honours ==
=== Premierships ===
| Competition | Division | Level | Wins | Years won |
|---|---|---|---|---|
| Victorian Amateur Football Association | Premier | Seniors | 2 | 1920, 1925 |
| Victorian Amateur Football Association | Premier B | Seniors | 1 | 1939 |
| Victorian Amateur Football Association | Division 1 | Seniors | 1 | 1951 |
| Victorian Amateur Football Association | Division 2 | Seniors | 1 | 2024 |
| Victorian Amateur Football Association | Division 3 | Seniors | 2 | 1991, 2023 |
| Victorian Amateur Football Association | Division 4 | Seniors | 1 | 2005 |

=== Minor premierships ===
| Competition | Division | Level | Wins | Years won |
|---|---|---|---|---|
| Victorian Amateur Football Association | Premier | Seniors | | 1920 |
| Victorian Amateur Football Association | Division 3 | Seniors | | 2023 |

== Seasons ==
| Premiers | Grand Finalist | Minor premiers | Finals appearance | Wooden spoon | Division leading goalkicker | Division best and fairest |

=== Men's ===
==== Seniors ====
| Year | League | Division | Finish | W | L | D | Coach | Captain | Best and fairest | Leading goalkicker | | Ref |
|---|---|---|---|---|---|---|---|---|---|---|---|---|
| 1906 | | | | | | | | | | | | |
| 1907 | CFA | | 5th | | | | | | | | | |
| 1908 | | | | | | | | | | | | |
| 1909 | FFA | | 5th | | | | | | | | | |
| 1910 | FFA | | 5th | | | | | | | | | |
| 1911 | MDFA | | | | | | | | | | | |
| 1912 | MDFA | | | | | | | | | | | |
| 1913 | FFA | | | | | | | | | | | |
| 1914 | MAFA | | 6th | 8 | 8 | 1 | | | | | | |
| 1915 | MAFA | | 10th | 2 | 12 | 0 | | | | | | |
| 1916 | MAFA | | (No season due to World War I) | | | | | | | | | |
| 1917 | MAFA | | (No season due to World War I) | | | | | | | | | |
| 1918 | MAFA | | (No season due to World War I) | | | | | | | | | |
| 1919 | MAFA | | (No season due to World War I) | | | | | | | | | |
| 1920 | MAFA | | 1st | 12 | 1 | 0 | | | | | | |
| 1921 | MAFA | | 5th | | | | | | | | | |
| 1922 | MAFA | B Section | 3rd | | | | | | | | | |
| 1923 | MAFA | A Section | 6th | | | | | | | | | |
| 1924 | MAFA | A Section | 4th | 9 | 5 | 0 | | | | Gallagher | 63 | |
| 1925 | MAFA | A Section | 2nd | | | | | | | Featherstone | 44 | |
| 1926 | MAFA | A Section | 3rd | 14 | 4 | 0 | | | | | | |
| 1927 | MAFA | A Section | 3rd | | | | | | | | | |
| 1928 | MAFA | A Section | 3rd | 11 | 7 | 0 | | | | | | |
| 1929 | MAFA | A Section | 5th | | | | | | | | | |

==== Reserves ====
| Year | League | Division | Finish | W | L | D | Coach | Captain | Best and fairest | Leading goalkicker | | Ref |
|---|---|---|---|---|---|---|---|---|---|---|---|---|
| 1923 | MAFA | B Section | 3rd | | | | | | | | | |
| 1924 | MAFA | B Section | 7th | 5 | 11 | 0 | | | | Horman | 28 | |
| 1925 | MAFA | B Section | 3rd | 10 | 5 | 1 | | | | Pert | 68 | |
| 1926 | MAFA | B Section | 7th | | | | | | | | | |
