= Caulfield Grammarians Football Club =

Caulfield Grammarians

Names
- Full name: Caulfield Grammarians Football Club
- Nickname(s): Fields, Grammarians

Club details
- Founded: 1920; 106 years ago
- Colours
- Competition: VAFA
- President: Richard Harris
- Coach: Paul Satterley (M), Danielle Distefano (W)
- Captain(s): Jack Ellwood(M), Serena Kuo & Milly Hines (W)
- Premierships: 11 (1925, 1949, 1953, 1961, 1970, 1983, 1998, 2000, 2011, 2019, 2019(W))
- Ground: Glen Huntly Oval

Uniforms
Home	Away

Other information
- Official website: cgfc.com.au

The Caulfield Grammarians Football Club is an Australian rules football club based in Caulfield East, Victoria. The club, composed of Caulfield Grammar School alumni is, the (equal) second oldest consecutively competing team in the Victorian Amateur Football Association (VAFA).

The team entered the competition in 1920, and has competed continuously since that time (competition was suspended from 1940 to 1945 during World War II). In 2020, the club’s centenary year, all 6 teams were in their respective A Grades.

Their home ground is the Glen Huntly Oval, at the corner of Neerim Road and Booran Road.

== Caulfield Grammar "Old Boys" ==
From time to time various teams of "Old Boys" were selected to play against the school's team. The first of these matches took place on 15 August 1889, and matches such as these took place on a regular basis from 1907 to 1914 (when the matches ceased due to World War I).

== Caulfield Grammarians Football Club ==
The Caulfield Grammarians Football Club was founded in early 1920. Caulfield Grammar School's headmaster, Walter Murray Buntine, was elected as its inaugural president. Buntine gave the team access to all of the schools sporting facilities for its training, and he allowed the team to use the school's oval as its home ground.

== Metropolitan Amateur Football Association ==
On Monday, 22 March 1920, a meeting of the (then) Metropolitan Amateur Football Association decided to resume the inter-club competition that it had suspended for the duration of World War I at the end of the 1915 season. The MAFA announced that the re-formed competition would be between four of the "pre-war" clubs, Collegians Football Club, South Yarra Amateur Football Club, Elsternwick Football Club, and Melbourne University Football Club (later University Blacks), and four "new clubs": Old Melburnians, Old Caulfield Grammarians, Melbourne Swimming Club Football Club and the Teachers’ College Football Club.

In their first competition match, on Saturday 15 May 1920, Old Caulfield Grammarians were narrowly beaten 7.11 (53) to 6.16 (50) by Collegians.

Their second competition match was against Teachers’ College on Saturday, 22 May 1920, at the Caulfield Grammar School Oval. Old Caulfield Grammarians won convincingly, 12.17 (89) to 3.7 (25).

A 1921 press report of the team's Metropolitan Amateur Football Association match against Hampton refers to the team as Old Caulfield Collegians; it is unclear whether this was an inadvertent typographical error — such as the South Australian newspaper references to Hans Ebeling (C.G.S. 1919–1922), as "the old Caulfield Collegian" — or a case of the reporter confusing the Old Caulfield Grammarians Football Club with an earlier team known as "Caulfield Collegians" that seems to have, from time to time, contained a large percentage of Caulfield Grammar "Old Boys".

In 1904, the Victorian press reported that Caulfield Collegians Football Club, centred on Caulfield Grammar School, that played its matches on the school grounds, was competing in a competition conducted by The Colleges' Football Association:

Great things are expected of … this association … formed at the beginning of the [1904] season … [and] composed of teams from various well-known schools, and one from the University … as it fills a long-felt want in providing games on Saturdays for those who, although they have left school, do not wish to surrender its healthy amusements.

In the competition's first season (1904), Caulfield Collegians Football Club was the premier team; and, in the second season (1905), Sherwood Collegians were premiers. There is no trace of any further competition conducted by the Colleges' Football Association.

== VAFA Senior Premierships ==
=== 1925 – B Grade ===
On Saturday, 12 September 1925, coached by former VFL senior umpire, Brighton coach, and Brunswick, Prahran, Brighton, and St Kilda footballer, Fred Turnbull and led by Ian Howell, Caulfield Grammarians beat Teachers' College by 37 points, 13.14 (92) to 8.7 (55) to win the B Section premiership at the Old Scotch Oval; the team's full forward, Eric Dakin, kicked four goals in the Grand Final to bring his season's total to 125 goals.

Goals: E.Dakin 4, Cassidy 4, Dunstan 2, Kohn 2, Chaffey.
Best: Pie, Matheson, Cassidy, Jones, Dunstan, Donaldson.

Under the rules prevailing at the time (see amended Argus system), because Old Caulfield Grammarians were the "minor premiers" at the end of the home-and-away season (they had only lost two matches in the entire season), the team's defeat of Teachers' College in this match meant that there was no need for a "Grand Final" to decide the premiership.

=== 1949 – D Grade ===
On Saturday, 3 September 1949, coached by Wally Crabtree and led by Sam “Mocca" Johnstone, Caulfield Grammarians beat Murrumbeena Football Club by 29 points, 9.10 (64) to 5.5 (35) to win the D Section Grand Final. Better players on the day included ruckman Bruce Small, centreman Ian Felsenthal, full forward Todd Cassidy and former St Kilda player Irving Davidson.

=== 1953 – C Grade ===
On Saturday, 5 September 1953, coached by Ian Hibbins and led by Ron Ashbolt, Caulfield Grammarians beat Powerhouse Football Club by two points, 10.9 (69) to 9.13 (67) to win the C Section Grand Final.

=== 1961 – D Grade ===
On Saturday, 9 September 1961, coached by John Wilson and led by Bill O'Halloran, Caulfield Grammarians beat West Brunswick Football Club by 15 points, 10.7 (67) to 8.4 (52) to win the D Section Grand Final at Ross Gregory Reserve. Caulfield had lost the 2nd Semi Final to West Brunswick in a tight game 2 weeks earlier, before beating Fairfield in the Preliminary Final to earn a rematch. Caulfield started the game well with Tony Johnstone kicking the first 2 goals of the game. Nigel Kendall kicked 5 goals and full back John Caspers was named best on ground.
Goals: N.Kendall 5, A.Johnstone 2, W.O'Halloran 2, R.Dixon.
Best: J.Caspers, N.Kendall, M.Northeast, W.O'Halloran, A.Johnstone, T.Tootell.

=== 1970 – A Grade ===
After having lost the 1967 and 1968 A Grade Grand Finals to Old Paradians by 18 points and 75 points respectively, on Saturday, 12 September 1970, coached by John Wilson (it was his 200th match as coach) and led by Tony Pyman (Club Captain David Williams missed the game with injury), Caulfield Grammarians held off a strongly finishing Coburg Amateurs team to win the 1970 A Section Premiership by two points, 14.18 (102) to 15.10 (100). Coburg had been the strong favourite going into the match, and the victory was the result of an exceptional team effort, made all the more worthwhile in the context of the Fields' inaccurate kicking.
Goals: G.Atchinson 2, J.Butcher 2, A.Lester 2, P.Hore 2, P.McLaughlin, L.McNicol, J.Lane, J.Hore, R.Allen, B.Morphett.
Best: A.Lester, J.Lane, K.Barker, L.McNicol, G.Tootell, B.Morphett.

=== 1983 – C Grade ===
On Saturday, 3 September 1983, coached by A.C.Poore and led by G. Stone, Caulfield Grammarians beat Parkside Football Club by 66 points, 20.16 (136) to 8.22 (70) to win the C Section Grand Final, with full-forward Dave Matthews kicking 10 goals in the Grand Final, for a total of 114 in the entire premiership season (viz., including the finals).
Goals: D.Matthews 10, C.Cooney 4, G.Voyage 2, R.Sisson 2, R.Berzins, J.Kanis.
Best: M.Sisson, J.Kanis, D.Matthews, C.Cooney, R.Fish, C.Stone.

=== 1998 – E Grade ===
Caulfield Grammarians, coached by Geoff Reilly and led by Dean Anderson, beat Old Camberwell Grammarians by 32 points at Central Reserve, 11.14 (80) to 7.6 (48) to win the 2000 E Blue Section Grand Final. Caulfield trailed by 5 points at the main break after a very tight first half, in which Captain Dean Anderson had to leave the field with a nasty head wound. He returned in the second half to inspire his team as Caulfield slowly put the game out of Camberwell's reach.
Goals: B.Hall 5, D.Anderson, B.Baxter, W.Bowes, M.DiCrosta, D.Lowe, H.Vella.
Best: D.Synman, W.Bowes, N.Lubransky, N.Brohier, T.Royals, D.Anderson.

=== 2000 – D Grade ===
Caulfield Grammarians, coached by Dean Anderson and led by Nigel Brohier, beat Old Essendon Grammarians at Box Hill City Oval by 125 points, 26.13 (169) to 6.8 (44) to win the 2000 D Section Grand Final. Stephen Amiet was awarded the J.W.Manton Medal for being voted best on ground.
Goals: S.Amiet 9, A.Will 6, D.Rosman 4, J.Margerison 2, J.Cowlishaw 2, G.Harrison, D.Pearce, T.Royals.
Best: S.Amiet, D.Pearce, J.Whitmee, S.Widjaja, D.Synman, M.Liddell.

This one sided contest was a far cry from the thrilling 2nd Semi Final between these two sides that was played a fortnight earlier. After a tight first half, Old Essendon had taken control of the game and led by 4 goals with minutes to play. Jason Cowlishaw then kicked 2 quick goals to get the Fields back into it and when Glen Harrison dribbled one through with only seconds left, the game was tied. Inspired by this late comeback, Caulfield dominated extra time to run out 19 point winners.

This year also saw Caulfield win the club's first Reserves Premiership, with a 51 point win over Old Essendon, 13.12 (90) to 5.9 (39). The highlight of the game being the sealing goal by club legend Scott Williams, on the run from 49m out. Coached by Kornal Dachs and led by Joe Santiago, this was redemption for much of the side who had narrowly lost in the 1998 decider.

=== 2011 – B Grade ===
On Saturday, 17 September 2011, coached by Steve Lawrence and led by Simon Widjaja, Caulfield Grammarians defeated St Bernards Old Collegians at Elsternwick Park by 33 points, 17.12 (114) to 12.9 (81) to win the 2011 B Section Premiership. Mark Liddell was awarded the Ian Cordner medal for being voted best on ground.
Goals: J.Perkins 5, G.Winter 3, C.Johnston 3, T.O'Sullivan 2, S.Garrubba 2, J.Shanahan, G.Meredith.
Best: M.Liddell, J.Shanahan, S.Garrubba, S.Wood, R.Lewis, J.Perkins.

=== 2019 – Women's B Grade ===
On Sunday, 18 August 2019, coached by Mitch Dupljanin and led by Toni Hamilton, Caulfield Grammarians defeated Old Xaverians at Mentone Playing Fields by 14 points, 2.2 (14) to 0.0 (0) to win the 2019 Women's B Section Premiership. Irena Malliaras was awarded the medal for being voted best on ground. The game was played in incredibly poor weather, which made scoring very difficult. This was Caulfield Grammarians' first women's premiership and achieved in only their 3rd year of existence. It also returns the club to A Grade, only 1 year after being relegated.
Goals: M.White, K.Macqueen.
Best: J.Harley, E.Baxter, I.Malliaras, T.Hamilton, B.Fox, M.Anthony.

=== 2019 – B Grade ===
On Saturday, 21 September 2019, coached by Simon Williams and led by Tim Nixon, Caulfield Grammarians defeated Old Scotch Football Club at Elsternwick Park by 92 points, 17.22 (124) to 4.8 (33) to win the 2019 B Section Premiership. Lachlan Stephens was awarded the Ian Cordner medal for being voted best on ground.
Goals: W.Osborn 3, L.Stephens 2, B.Goddard 2, J.Dobosz 2, N.Page 2, J.Wallace 2, W.Barker, T.Green, T.Nixon, T.Thompson.
Best: J.Webster, L.Stephens, D.Reilly, J.Wallace, W.Edwards, W.Osborn.

== VAFA Other Premierships ==
=== 1990 – U/19 Section 3 ===
Caulfield Grammarians, coached by Ray Keane and led by Nigel Caple, beat Albanvale by 24 points, 20.12 (132) to 17.6 (108) to win the 1990 U/19 Section 3 Grand Final. Clint Baxter was voted best afield.
Goals: N.Caple 6, C.Baxter 6, C.Garraway 4, W.Bryne 2, G.Harrison, A.Kouvaris.
Best: C.Baxter, N.Caple, C.Simpson, R.Royals, J.Dight, N.Cox..

=== 2000 – D Grade Reserves ===
Caulfield Grammarians, coached by Kornal Dachs and led by Joe Santiago, beat Old Essendon Grammarians by 51 points at Box Hill City Oval, 13.12 (90) to 5.9 (39) to win the 2000 D Reserves Section Grand Final.
Goals: N/A.
Best: N/A.

=== 2001 – U/19 Section 2 ===
Caulfield Grammarians, coached by Chris Mathieson and led by Richard Foote, beat Werribee by 68 points at Warrawee Park, 17.13 (115) to 6.11 (47) to win the 2001 U/19 Section 2 Grand Final. Caulfield lead all day, after a much closer 2nd Semi Final 2 weeks earlier.
Goals: A.Bruhn 3, R.Foote 3, L.Schneider 3, A.Sinclair 2, P.Roberts, L.Browne, T.Foster, C.Hooper, K.Boehm, N.Fallu.
Best: L.Schneider, M.Pennycuick, K.Boehm, W.Frost, I.Glass, T.Foster.

=== 2002 – C Grade Reserves ===
Caulfield Grammarians, coached by Martin DiCrosta and led by John Jacobs, beat Old Camberwell Grammarians by 26 points at Elsternwick Park, 9.11 (65) to 5.9 (39) to win the 2002 C Reserves Section Grand Final. Caulfield led all day after a strong first quarter into the breeze. Mark Pennycuick was voted best on ground.
Goals: M.Pennycuick 4, J.Dalwood 2, S.Kendall, J.Margerison, J.Cowlishaw.
Best: M.Pennycuick, S.Thompson, S.Sant, G.Erickson, J.Jacobs, J.Dalwood.

=== 2010 – C Grade Reserves ===
Caulfield Grammarians, coached by Will Bowes and led by Aiden Clarke, beat Ormond Amateur Football Club by 28 points at Trevor Barker Oval, 9.13 (69) to 5.11 (41) to win the 2010 C Section Grand Final. In what was a tight affair, Caulfield took the lead in the 2nd quarter and never relinquished it for the rest of the game. Ruckman Nick Dorman was named best on ground by the umpires.
Goals: D.Spanos 2, J.Kremmer 2, A.Strain 2, R.Foote, D.Allanson, J.McCahon.
Best: R.Foote, A.Strain, N.Dorman, A.Lawson, A.Townsend, J.Kremmer.

=== 2010 – Club XVIII South ===
Caulfield Grammarians, coached by Shaun Frazier and led by Simon Cunliffe, beat Mazenod Old Collegians by 26 points at Elsternwick Park, 8.16 (64) to 5.8 (38) to win the 2010 Club XVII South Section Grand Final. The umpires selected Simon Cunliffe as best on ground.
Goals: G.Vanderkruk 4, B.Scott 2, A.Bednarek, N.Guyatt.
Best: N.Guyatt, G.Crathern, J.Pitts, S.Cunliffe, A.Bednarek, P.Farmer.

=== 2015 – U/19 Section 2 ===
Caulfield Grammarians, coached by Josh McCahon and led by James Small, beat Parkdale by 24 points at Trevor Barker Oval, 13.14 (92) to 8.20 (68) to win the 2015 U/19 Section 2 Grand Final. Caulfield had finished the season in 4th and only won the 1st Semi Final by 1 point against Fitzroy on their run to the Grand Final.
Goals: L.Topp 3, F.McEvoy 3, T.Tonkin 2, T.Stephenson, J.Small, N.Answerth, K.Malignaggi, J.Toniolo.
Best: J.Toniolo, F.McEvoy, T.Smith, C.Bold, Z.Amos, J.Stewart.

=== 2016 – U/19 Section 2 ===
Caulfield Grammarians, coached by Josh McCahon and led by Myles Spielvogel, beat Parkdale by 14 points at Trevor Barker Oval, 12.6 (78) to 9.10 (64) to win the 2016 U/19 Section 2 Grand Final. This was the first time in club history that a team had gone back to back.
Goals: M.Spielvogel 3, M.Ball 2, S.Dorevitch, L.Edwards, B.Fynmore, N.Baltas, J.Toniolo, B.Kuang, O.Gagiero.
Best: O.Allis, L.Harris, Z.Amos, M.Simpson, M.Spielvogel, J.Lewis.

=== 2016 – C Grade Thirds ===
Caulfield Grammarians, coached by Will Bowes and led by Nick O'Connor, beat Marcellin Old Collegians by 39 points at Elsternwick Park, 14.6 (90) to 7.9 (51) to win the 2016 C Thirds Section Grand Final. This was a particularly sweet win as the previous season the club didn't have the personnel to even field a Thirds team.
Goals: A.Strain 5, S.Richards 2, C.Hogan 2, J.Smart, M.Wood, N.O'Connor, W.Kingwill, B.Chilko.
Best: J.Anderson, C.Hogan, M.Linklater, A.Strain, J.Smart, K.Malignaggi.

=== 2017 – C Grade Reserves ===
Caulfield Grammarians, coached by Seb Gotch and led by Damien Hay and Rob Handel, beat Marcellin Old Collegians by 38 points at Casey Fields, 9.17 (71) to 5.3 (33) to win the 2017 C Reserves Section Grand Final.
Goals: W.Kingwill 4, R.Handel 2, J.Small, H.Marshall, D.Hay.
Best: T.Smith, R.Harris, J.Anderson, W.Kingwill, L.Everett, D.Hay.

=== 2019 – B Grade Thirds ===
Caulfield Grammarians, coached by Will Bowes and led by Aiden Clarke, beat De La Salle Old Collegians by 39 points at Box Hill City Oval, 9.7 (61) to 3.4 (22) to win the 2019 B Thirds Section Grand Final. Veteran back Andrew Spittal was named best on ground by the umpires.
Goals: M.Ball 4, R.Handel 2, Z.Parsons, J.Waldron, J.Small.
Best: H.Mills, M.Ball, W.Ingham, S.Pincus, E.McDonald, J.Easton.

=== 2021 – U/19 Section Premier ===
Caulfield Grammarians, coached by Lachlan Rayner, Daniel Sherman, and Stephen Kendall, led by Harry Neave, progressed to a 10–1 finish in a COVID interrupted campaign. They were awarded the 2021 U19 Premier Minor Premiership, the first piece of silverware ever recorded for the club in U19 Premier.

=== 2024 – U/19 Division 4 ===
Caulfield Grammarians, coached by Marc Cassidy and led by Jack Pinder, beat St Mary’s Salesian by 21 points at Trevor Barker Oval, 11.12 (78) to 7.15 (57) to win the 2024 U19 Division 4 Grand Final. Captain Jack Pinder was named best on ground by the umpires.
Goals: K.Watt 4, J.Pinder 2, Q.Cooper 2, J.Bevis, T.Coleman, L.Rudden.
Best: Q.Cooper, J.Pinder, H.Wood, L.Rudden, J.McVean, S.Haffenden.

== VAFA awards ==
=== Best and Fairest in Section ===
A number of footballers from Caulfield Grammarians have been voted the best and fairest player in their Section.

- 1928: G.B. Cassidy — A Section
- 1959: Robin Harrison — C Section
- 1965: Geoff Ward — B Section
- 1970: S.D.McLaughlin — U/19 Section 2
- 1976: Tony Lester — B Section
- 1980: John Roseman — U/19 Section 2
- 1998: Simon Widjaja — U/19 Section Blue
- 2019: Charles Ingham — U/19 Premier
- 2021: Irena Malliaras — A Section Women’s

=== Leading Goalkicker in Section ===
A number of footballers from Caulfield Grammarians have been the leading goalkicker in their Section.

- 1925: Eric Dakin — B Section (125 goals), the first VAFA footballer to score 100 goals or more in a single season.
- 1963: Nigel Kendall — C Section (48 goals)
- 1972: John Butcher — A Section (80 goals)
- 1977: John Butcher — A Section (60 goals)
- 1983: David Matthews — C Section (101 goals)
- 1984: David Matthews — B Section (66 goals)
- 2000: Stephen Amiet — D1 Section (91 goals)
- 2006: Brett Sinclair — B Section (68 goals)
- 2007: Brett Sinclair — B Section (78 goals)
- 2009: Andrew Slevinson — C Section (91 goals)
- 2017: Declan Reilly — C Section (56 goals)
- 2019: Julian Dobosz — B Section (48 goals)

== Team of the century ==
CGFC Team of the Century
B:	Geoff Fox	Campbell Cooney	John Griffiths
HB:	Nigel Brohier	Kel Davidson	John Long
C:	Alan Chaffey	Tony Lester	David Clark
HF:	Barry Morphett	David Williams	Ron Ashbolt
F:	John Butcher	David Matthews	Trevor Royals
Foll:	Greg Tootell	Robin Harrison	John Kanis
Int:	Dick Fish	Tony Pyman	Larry McNicol
Int:	Bill O'Halloran	Warwick Watson	Andrew Will
Coach:	John Wilson; Assistant coach: Wally Crabtree		

== Notable events ==
- 1925: I.H. Howell (the Old Caulfield Grammarians' captain), was attacked by a supporter of the Caulfield Football Club (formerly known as Caulfield City) who ran onto the field and struck him immediately after the 8 August 1925 match. The Metropolitan Amateur Football Association investigated the matter, and the Caulfield Football Club was expelled from the competition (viz., the club was expelled for its supporters' behaviour, but the players were held "blameless").
- 1934: In March, C Section team, Dandenong K.S.P. Football Club, admitted to the competition in 1930, announced that it was unable to compete in 1934 for "financial reasons". Its place in C Section was taken by Old Caulfield Grammarians, who would otherwise have been relegated to D Section.
- 1934: Just before three quarter time in the C Section match between Old Caulfield Grammarians and Glenhuntly Amateur Football Club, at the Caulfield Grammar School Oval, on Saturday, 16 June 1934, the field umpire sent C. Robinson of Glenhuntly off the field for the rest of the game. On the following Thursday, the Independent Tribunal of the Association met, and found that the charges laid by the field umpire against Robinson (kicking at J. Dowding, and striking Bruce Wemyss) were sustained, and Robinson was disqualified for twelve months.
- 1968: Greg Tootell selected as part of the Touring Party of the 1968 Australian Football World Tour.
- 2003: Former player and coach John Wilson awarded a Life Membership of the VAFA.

== See also ==
- Caulfield Grammar School
- List of Caulfield Grammar School people
