= Old Xaverians Football Club =

Australian rules football club

Old Xaverians

Names
- Full name: Old Xaverians Football Club
- Nickname: Old Xavs
- Club song: "We are the boys from the Old Xavs"

Club details
- Founded: 1923; 103 years ago
- Colours
- Competition: VAFA
- President: Matt Cosgrave
- Coach: James Byrne
- Premierships: (14): 1981, 1995, 1996, 1997, 1998, 1999, 2000, 2003, 2005, 2007, 2009, 2010, 2013, 2016
- Ground: Toorak Park

Uniforms
Home

Other information
- Official website: oldxavs.com.au

The Old Xaverians Football Club is an Australian rules football club based in Toorak, an inner suburb of Melbourne.

The club was established in 1923 by alumni of Jesuit school Xavier College in Kew. The club is one of the most successful in the Victorian Amateur Football Association, having won 14 VAFA Premier Section flags, with its first in 1981. It won an unprecedented six premierships in six years between 1995 and 2000.

The OXFC currently fields nine teams in the VAFA competition (seven men's, two women's). And are renowned as one of the most successful clubs in the VAFA. With Toorak park in Armadale being the seniors main home ground, the other men's teams (including the u19's) are based at Stradbroke Park, Kew East. The women's team, established in 2017 and a foundation member of the VAFA's Premier Women Section, plays home games at Xavier College, Kew.

== History ==
The club was established in 1923 by four alumni of Xavier College of Kew. The team entered to the Metropolitan Amateur Football Association where it started to compete at a very high standard among other Old boy football associations. After a first difficult season, the club realised it would need to recruit new players.

The cost of running a football club in these days, even in an amateur organisation such as we play under, is very high. Umpires and trainers' fees, material and sundry expenses were the means of us spending sixty pounds or so, and it is to the great credit of members that mainly through their efforts this amount has been cleared to within a few pounds.

— Gerald Honan, the first club secretary.

== Premierships ==
=== Senior ===
- Premier A (14): 1981, 1995, 1996, 1997, 1998, 1999, 2000, 2003, 2005, 2007, 2009, 2010, 2013, 2016
- Premier B (3): 1948, 1962, 1980
- Premier C (2): 1938, 1978
- Division 1 (1): 1976

=== Reserves ===
- Reserve Division (19): 1964, 1966, 1995, 1997, 1998, 2000, 2001, 2002, 2006, 2007, 2013, 2015, 2017, 2019, 2021, 2022, 2023, 2025, 2026

=== Thirds ===
- OXFC Blacks (Les Ménages) (8): 2005, 2010, 2011, 2013, 2014, 2019, 2023, 2024
- OXFC Reds (U23) (8): 2011, 2014, 2015, 2016, 2019, 2022, 2023, 2026

=== U19 ===
- U19 Premier Section (13): 1987, 1992, 1994, 1996, 1998, 1999, 2001, 2011, 2015, 2017, 2018, 2022, 2023
- U19 Reserves Premierships (2): 2011, 2018

=== Club XVIII ===
- OXFC Crocodiles (25): 1983, 1988, 1992, 1993, 1994, 1996, 1997, 1998, 1999, 2000, 2001, 2002, 2003, 2004, 2006, 2007, 2010, 2012, 2013, 2014, 2017, 2022, 2023, 2024, 2026
