= Leopold Football Club =

Former Australian football club

Names
- Full name: Leopold Football Club
- Nickname: Leos

Club details
- Founded: 1898; 128 years ago
- Dissolved: 1924; 102 years ago
- President: C.D.M. Thomson (1912)
- Premierships: MJFA (5): 1900; 1901; 1910; 1911; 1913
- Ground: Warehousemen's Cricket Ground

Uniforms
Home

The Leopold Football Club was an Australian rules football club based in the suburb of South Melbourne.

The club is best known for acting as the reserves team for the South Melbourne Football Club in the Victorian Junior Football League (VJFL, later AFL reserves) from 1919 until 1924.

== History ==
Leopold first appeared in historical records in 1890 playing a programme of social games each season. In 1895 they were influential in the formation of the newly formed 'fourth rate' competition; the South Suburban Junior Football Association where they were runners up in 1895 to the Marlton Club and premiers in 1896 and 1897. In 1898 they joined the Metropolitan Junior Football Association (MJFA). The club won its first MJFA premiership in 1900, going back-to-back with another victory in 1901. At the time, the club played its home games at Warehousemen's Cricket Ground.

The club originally played home fixtures on a ground near the Middle Park railway station. From 1898 to 1900 they played at the North Port Oval, 1901 to 1904 on the Warehouseman’s ground, and from 1905 to 1924 on the Lakeside Oval.

The club’s was believed to be formed by members of the Rechabites and chose the name Leopold as a tribute to Queen Victoria’s youngest son Prince Leopold who was a prominent proponent of teetotalism.

Their uniform was a red jumper with blue shorts and red hose. Their all red hose led to their nickname being the Redlegs. In 1922 they changed to a white jumper with a red sash which they wore until 1924.

At some point around 1904, Leopold had a relationship with the Melbourne Football Club. Possibly due to its use of the Warehousemans Ground (Albert Ground) in this era. However, its later use of the South Melbourne Cricket Ground (Lake Oval) forged its connexion with the South Melbourne Football Club.

The club won two premierships in a row again in 1910 and 1911. In 1912, like other MJFA clubs developing formal affiliations, Leopold developed an association with the South Melbourne Football Club, which competed in the Victorian Football League (VFL). As South Melbourne was a senior side, Leopold operated as its junior team. South Melbourne’s 1909 VFL premiership team contained six players (Dave Barry, George Bower, Bob Deas, Horrie Drane, Alf Gough, and Alan Pentland) recruited from the Leopold Club and indicated the standard of the Leopolds.

A fifth premiership was won in 1913, before the impacts of World War I in Australia affected football competitions. The MJFA went into recess in 1916 and Leopold similarly went into recess from 1916 to 1918. The VFL had chosen to form a feeder competition for its clubs prior to the outbreak of the war but held off until 1919 to institute it. As the MJFA was yet to reform, Leopold chose to accept South Melbourne FC’s offer to be its representative in the VJFL.

The club’s influence on the football world in the first half of the twentieth century was profound. Former players were Like McBrien who was VFL Secretary 1929 to 1956; George Cathie who was founding editor of the Football Record; Jack McGuinness Secretary of the Geelong Football Club; and Squire Reid VFA President 1947-48. It was often described in the press as the best junior club in Melbourne and given its record against clubs like Brighton, Coburg and Hawthorn who went on to play in the VFA and VFL, it was surprising it was not offered a place in a higher competition but the lack of its own home ground and failure to be a district named club clearly worked against them being promoted to the VFL or VFA. The MJFA often played its finals matches as curtain raisers to VFL finals games and so the Leopolds were well known to the broader football community.

=== VJFL ===
The VFL introduced a reserves competition in 1919, known as the Victorian Junior Football League (VJFL), and Leopold contested as South Melbourne's affiliate until the end of the 1924 season. Other VFL clubs had affiliate clubs represent them such as Collingwood District FC, Carlton Juniors FC but the terms Districts and Juniors were later discarded.

In 1925, the competition was renamed as the VFL seconds and the League decided that all senior clubs must have a representative side. Leopold had two choices; rename itself as the South Melbourne second eighteen or continue in its own name in another competition. It chose the former option and on the eve of the 1925 season at its AGM, the Club renamed itself. It operated as a separately run committee as the South Melbourne Second Eighteen until 1933 when the VFL directed all Clubs to bring their Reserves teams under the direct control of their senior committees.

In 1936 there was an effort to revive the Club and a Leopold team was entered in the A Grade of the Melbourne Boys League. The organisation of the team was rushed and struggled to recruit players. It finished the season bottom of the eight teams with no wins, twelve losses, and one no match. It did not reappear again in 1937 and the Leopold name disappeared forever.

== Seasons ==
Premiers	Grand Finalist	Minor premiers	Finals appearance	Wooden spoon	League leading goalkicker	League best and fairest

Year	League	Finish	W	L	D	Captain	President	Secretary	Treasurer	Ref
1895	SSJFA	2nd	14	2	0					
1896	SSJFA	1st				J. Deas	R. J. Cathie	S. Cathie		
1897	SSJFA	1st				J. Deas	R. J. Cathie	L. W. Bennett		
1898	MJFA	3rd	9	5	2			L. W. Bennett		
1899	MJFA	2nd	10	4	3			G. Cathie		
1900	MJFA	1st	15	1	0	T. Williams	J. Noy	J. O'Donnell	J. Lillie	
1901	MJFA	1st	14	14	0	T. Williams	J. Noy	E. Hocking	J. Lillie	
1902	MJFA	5th	9	7	0	T. Williams	R. J. Cathie	S. J. Cathie	J. Lillie	
1903	MJFA	2nd	14	1	1	T. Williams	R. J. Cathie	J. Remington	J. Lillie	
1904	MJFA	3rd	12	6	0	T. Williams	R. J. Cathie		J. Lillie	
1905	MJFA	3rd	11	6	1	T. Williams	R. J. Cathie	R. Howie	J. Lillie	
1906	MJFA	4th	12	6	0		J. C. H. Richardson			
1907	MJFA	5th	9	9	0	-. Curnow	E. D. M. Thomson	J. R. Briggs	R. Howie	
1908	MJFA	2nd	16	2	0		E. D. M. Thomson	J. R. Briggs	R. Howie	
1909	MJFA	3rd	15	3	0	T. Drewitt	E. D. M. Thomson	J. R. Briggs	T. Drewitt	
1910	MJFA	2nd	14	4	0	J. Bray	E. D. M. Thomson	D. M. McIntosh	L. H. McBrien	
1911	MJFA	1st	17	1	0		E. D. M. Thomson	D. M. McIntosh	L. H. McBrien	
1912	MAFA	4th	12	6	0	T. Hughes	E. D. M. Thomson	E. N. Glass	L. H. McBrien	
1913	MAFA	2nd	14	3	1	T. Hughes	E. D. M. Thomson	E. N. Glass	L. H. McBrien	
1914	MAFA	3rd	12	6	0	T. Hughes	L. Tate	E. N. Glass	E. S. Evans	
1915	MAFA	2nd	12	1	1	T. Hughes	L. Tate	E. N. Glass	E. S. Evans	
1919	VJFL	3rd	3rd	10	6	W. Hennington	L. Tate	E. N. Glass		
1920	VJFL	7th	6	10	0	P. Skehan & C. Glass	T. J. Sealy	H. Jarman	E. N. Glass	
1921	VJFL	9th	1	15	0	M. Ryan & L. Turner	T. J. Sealy	H. Jarman	E. N. Glass	
1922	VJFL	9th	4	12	0	T. Hughes	T. J. Sealy	H. M. Stanley	E. N. Glass	
1923	VJFL	5th	9	9	0	M. Ryan	T. J. Sealy	H. M. Sealy	J. McGuinness Jnr	
1924	VJFL	5th	10	8	0	E. Marsh	T. J. Sealy	H. M. Sealy	J. N. A. Meehan	
1936	MBL A	8th	0	12	*					

== VFL (AFL) players ==
- Jim Addison (Collingwood)
- Harold F Alexander (South Melbourne)
- George Anderson (South Melbourne & University)
- Sydney B Anderson (Melbourne)
- Bert Avery (South Melbourne & Melbourne)
- Harry Barnes (North Melbourne)
- Dave Barry (South Melbourne)
- Fred Birnstihl (Footscray)
- Percy Blencowe South Melbourne)
- Harry Boully (Melbourne)
- George Bower (South Melbourne)
- Alf Boyce (South Melbourne & Fitzroy)
- Harry Bromley (South Melbourne)
- Marshall Caffyn (South Melbourne)
- George J Cathie (Melbourne)
- Ernest Cazaly (St Kilda)
- Les Charge (South Melbourne)
- Tom Clancy (South Melbourne)
- Bill Condon (South Melbourne)
- Fred Condon (South Melbourne)
- Vin Coutie (Melbourne)
- Bobby Craig (Melbourne)
- Jack Deas (South Melbourne, Fitzroy & Essendon)
- Horrie Drane (Melbourne & South Melbourne)
- Don Fraser (Collingwood)
- Bobby Gibb (South Melbourne)
- Charlie Goding (Melbourne & South Melbourne)
- Alf L Gough (South Melbourne)
- Alec Gray (South Melbourne)
- Frank Harley (Richmond)
- Bill Hennington (South Melbourne)
- Ern Hocking {Melbourne)
- Len Hogg (South Melbourne)
- Sid Hogg (South Melbourne)
- Alex Holland (Collingwood & Melbourne)
- Tommy Hughes (Carlton)
- Alby Jacobsen (South Melbourne & Essendon)
- Ted E Johnson (South Melbourne)
- Ted Keggin (Richmond)
- Jim Makin (South Melbourne & Melbourne)
- Fred Mann (Essendon)
- Edwin Marsh (South Melbourne)
- Charles McDonald (South Melbourne)
- Angus McDonald (St Kilda)
- Tom Moloughney (Fitzroy & St Kilda)
- Herbert Moore (South Melbourne)
- Dick Mullaly (South Melbourne)
- Alan O'Donoghue (Richmond & South Melbourne)
- Ted O'Meara (South Melbourne)
- George Peacock (Melbourne)
- Bill Hennington (South Melbourne)
- Alan Pentland (South Melbourne)
- Fred Pitt (South Melbourne & Carlton)
- Gladstone Power (South Melbourne)
- Arthur Rademacher (South Melbourne)
- Alf Richardson (St Kilda)
- Jack E Richardson (South Melbourne)
- Charles Rowe (St Kilda)
- Les Rusich (South Melbourne)
- Bert Russell (South Melbourne)
- Joe Scanlan (South Melbourne)
- Paddy Scanlan (South Melbourne & Footscray)
- Phil Skehan (South Melbourne)
- Wal Smallhorn (South Melbourne)
- Percy Smith (Richmond)
- Jim Sutherland (South Melbourne)
- Herbert Sutton (South Melbourne & Hawthorn)
- Jack H Todd (Carlton & South Melbourne)
- Hedley Tomkins (Fitzroy & Melbourne)
- Stan Wootton (South Melbourne & Richmond)
