= 1915 MAFA season =

24th season of the Metropolitan Amateur Football Association

- Date: 24 April − 7 August 1915
- Teams: 10
- Premiers: Collingwood District; 1st premiership
- Minor premiers: Collingwood District; 2nd minor premiership
- Wooden spooners: Elsternwick; 1st wooden spoon

The 1915 MAFA season was the 24th season of the Metropolitan Amateur Football Association (MAFA), an Australian rules football competition played in the state of Victoria. The season began on 24 April and concluded earlier than scheduled on 7 August, comprising a 14-match home-and-away season, followed by a two-week finals series.

Collingwood District won the MAFA premiership for the first time, defeating Leopold by 15 points in the 1915 MAFA Grand Final.

This was the final MAFA season until 1920, with the 1916, 1917, 1918 and 1919 seasons cancelled due to the impacts of World War I.

== Association membership ==
Like the previous season in 1914, a total of ten teams competed in the MAFA.

On 16 October 1914, three weeks after the end of the 1914 season, the University Football Club dropped out of the Victorian Football League (VFL). The club had competed in the MJFA/MAFA with a senior team from 1905 to 1907, and had been fielding a "2nd" (reserves) team in the competition since 1908. After leaving the VFL, University's senior team returned to the MAFA in 1915, with several of its VFL players staying with the club.

Additionally, the Caulfield Football Club combined with Malvern prior to the start of the 1915 season and became known as "Caulfield-Malvern".

== World War I ==
The 1915 home-and-away season was originally scheduled to end on 26 August. However, due to the impacts of World War I – including a significant number of players enlisting in the Australian Army – the MJFA decided at a meeting on 26 July to curtail the home-and-away season four weeks early.

Prior to the final games held in round 14, some clubs had already struggled to find players as a result of enlistments. This included Collegians, which on 17 July was unable to field a team for the first time – and as of 2024, only time – in its history.

Following the conclusion of the season, officials from the VFL sought to have the MAFA become a reserves competition to the VFL for the 1916 season. At least two clubs – Beverley and South Yarra – reported the MAFA that they had been "approached" about becoming reserves teams to Richmond and St Kilda respectively. The MAFA announced in late 1915 that they would not resume competition until the war had ended, while also stating that they were not prepared to be absorbed by the VFL. Ultimately, no MAFA seasons would be held until 1920.

As of 30 July 1915, 164 MJFA players had been enlisted in the Australian Army:

- Beverley – 11
- Carlton District – 26
- Caulfield – 8
- Collegians – 15
- Collingwood District – 13
- Elsternwick – 32
- Fitzroy Juniors – 13
- Leopold – 12
- South Yarra – 27
- University – 7

== Home-and-away season ==
=== Round 1 ===
	Round 1
Saturday, 24 April	Beverley 12.11 (83)	def.	University 4.9 (33)	Richmond Cricket Ground
Saturday, 24 April	Fitzroy Juniors 6.9 (45)	def.	Carlton District 4.6 (30)	Brunswick Street Oval
Saturday, 24 April	Collegians 13.11 (89)	def.	Elsternwick 9.13 (67)	Albert Cricket Ground
Saturday, 24 April	Caulfield-Malvern 5.9 (39)	def. by	Collingwood District 8.13 (69)	Caulfield Park
Saturday, 24 April	Leopold 7.7 (49)	drew with	South Yarra 7.7 (49)	South Melbourne Cricket Ground

=== Round 2 ===
	Round 2
Saturday, 1 May	Collingwood District 6.23 (59)	def.	Beverley 4.8 (32)	Victoria Park
Saturday, 1 May	Carlton District 5.7 (37)	def. by	Leopold 7.9 (52)	Princes Park
Saturday, 1 May	South Yarra 8.13 (61)	drew with	Collegians 8.13 (61)	St Kilda Cricket Ground
Saturday, 1 May	University 6.8 (44)	def. by	Fitzroy Juniors 12.11 (83)	University Oval
Saturday, 1 May	Elsternwick 6.11 (47)	def. by	Caulfield-Malvern 7.15 (57)	Elsternwick Park

=== Round 3 ===
	Round 3
Saturday, 8 May	Leopold 8.10 (58)	def.	Beverley 4.7 (31)	South Melbourne Cricket Ground
Saturday, 8 May	Carlton District 9.12 (66)	def.	Elsternwick 3.4 (22)	Princes Park
Saturday, 8 May	Collingwood District 11.12 (78)	def.	South Yarra 6.15 (51)	Victoria Park
Saturday, 8 May	Fitzroy Juniors 11.14 (80)	def.	Caulfield-Malvern 5.7 (37)	Brunswick Street Oval
	Bye; Collegians, University

=== Round 4 ===
	Round 4
Saturday, 15 May	Beverley 2.13 (25)	def.	Collegians 3.4 (22)	Richmond Cricket Ground
Saturday, 15 May	Caulfield-Malvern 5.6 (36)	def. by	Carlton District 14.10 (94)	Caulfield
Saturday, 15 May	University 1.2 (8)	def. by	Collingwood District 8.22 (70)	University Oval
Saturday, 15 May	South Yarra 5.5 (35)	def. by	Fitzroy Juniors 12.13 (85)	St Kilda Cricket Ground
Saturday, 15 May	Elsternwick 2.7 (19)	def. by	Leopold 10.14 (74)	Elsternwick Park

=== Round 5 ===
	Round 5
Saturday, 22 May	Beverley 7.13 (55)	def.	Elsternwick 2.4 (16)	Richmond Cricket Ground
Saturday, 22 May	Carlton District 6.10 (46)	def.	University 1.2 (8)	Princes Park
Saturday, 22 May	Collegians 3.6 (24)	def. by	Collingwood District 11.6 (72)	Albert Cricket Ground
Saturday, 22 May	South Yarra 4.11 (35)	def.	Caulfield-Malvern 4.6 (30)	St Kilda Cricket Ground
Saturday, 22 May	Fitzroy Juniors 6.4 (40)	def.	Leopold 3.6 (24)	Brunswick Street Oval

== Ladder ==
Pos	Team	Pld	W	L	D	Pts	Qualification
1	Collingwood District (P)	14	13	1	0	52	Finals series
2	Leopold	14	12	1	1	50	Finals series
3	Fitzroy Juniors	14	12	2	0	48	Finals series
4	Carlton District	14	8	6	0	32	Finals series
5	South Yarra	14	6	6	2	28	
6	Beverley	14	4	10	0	16	
7	Collegians	14	3	9	2	16	
8	University	14	4	10	0	16	
9	Caulfield-Malvern	14	2	11	1	10	
10	Elsternwick	14	2	12	0	8	

(P) Premiers

== Finals ==
At the time, the MAFA used the Argus finals system, which gave the club that finished first on the ladder at the end of the home-and-away season (the minor premiers) the right to challenge the winner of the finals series for the premiership.

=== Semi-finals ===
	Semi-finals
Saturday, 31 July	Collingwood District 9.24 (78)	def.	Carlton District 5.4 (34)	East Melbourne Cricket Ground
Saturday, 31 July (3:00pm)	Leopold 10.11 (71)	drew with	Fitzroy Juniors 10.11 (71)	Richmond Cricket Ground
Leopold and Fitzroy Juniors drew in their match, with the final score being 10.11 (71) each. At the time, a rule existed in the MAFA which stated "that should a tie take place in either of the matches played in the second round [finals series] the club with the best performances during the season shall adjourned the winner". With Leopold finishing the home-and-away season with two points more than Fitzroy Juniors, the MAFA decided at a meeting on 2 August that they would advance to the grand final.; The semi-finals were originally scheduled to be held on 28 August prior to the curtailing of the home-and-away season.

=== Grand Final ===
1915 MAFA Grand Final
Saturday, 7 August	Collingwood District	def.	Leopold	Richmond Cricket Ground
9.10 (64)	Q1; Q2; Q3; Final	6.13 (49)	Umpires: Hood
Oram 2, Carkeek 2, T. Bayliss 2, Brown, Lumsden, G. Bayliss	Goals	Schilling 2, Skehan, Harley, Gunn, Murra
Lumsden (striking), Nash (elbowing), T. Bayliss (striking)	Reports	Harley (striking), Hughes (elbowing), Skehan (bad languague)
The grand final was originally scheduled to be held on 4 September prior to the curtailing of the home-and-away season.
