= 1909 MJFA season =

18th season of the Metropolitan Junior Football Association

- Date: 1 May – 11 September 1909
- Teams: 10
- Premiers: South Yarra; 2nd premiership
- Minor premiers: South Yarra; 2nd minor premiership

The 1909 MJFA season, also known as the 1909 MFA season, was the 18th season of the Metropolitan Junior Football Association (MJFA). (Note: In 1900, the Metropolitan Junior Football Association (MJFA, now VAFA) decided on a change of name to the Metropolitan Football Association (MFA). MJFA president Lawrence Adamson brokered a deal that the existing MFA (of 1899) became the MJFA, giving his MJFA (of 1892) the "Metropolitan Football Association" name. Despite this, various newspaper reports from 1900 until 1912 still use the MJFA name when referring to Adamson's competition, most consensus is that "MJFA" in this time period refers to the now-VAFA, and the VAFA's official history continues to use the MJFA name until 1912.) The season began on 1 May and concluded on 11 September, comprising an 18-match home-and-away season, followed by a two-week finals series.

South Yarra won the MJFA premiership for the second year in a row, defeating Beverley in the 1909 MJFA Grand Final. This was the first time a finals series had been held in the MJFA.

== Association membership ==
Like the previous season in 1908, a total of ten teams competed in the MJFA. Port Rovers, who won the premiership in 1905, withdrew from the competition after being unable to find a suitable home ground.

Carlton District, who had unsuccessfully applied for admission in 1908, were accepted into the MJFA. Carlton District had been playing in the Metropolitan Churches and the Melbourne District Football Association, being premiers twice, runners-up twice, and third once.

The decision by the senior Carlton Football Club to support Carlton District with the use of its home ground left the Carlton Junior Football Club, which had previously supplied players to the seniors, without support. Initially, the Juniors were set to withdraw from the Victorian Junior Football Association (VJFA), but they eventually were able to find a home ground and compete, although they disbanded at the end of the 1909 season.

== Ladder ==
Pos	Team	Pld	W	L	D	PF	PA	Pts	Qualification
1	South Yarra (P)	18	15	3	0	1210	453	60	Finals series
2	Beverley	18	15	3	0	1137	537	60	Finals series
3	Leopold	18	15	3	0	977	570	60	Finals series
4	University 2nd	18	14	4	0	1102	632	56	Finals series
5	Collegians	18	10	8	0	1268	956	40	
6	Carlton District	18	6	12	0	876	993	24	
7	Hawthorn	18	5	13	0	763	994	20	
8	Caulfield	18	4	14	0	601	1214	16	
9	Collingwood District	18	3	15	0	650	1184	12	
10	Oakleigh	18	3	15	0	554	1603	12	

(P) Premiers; (W) Club withdrew

== Finals ==
Prior to 1909, the MJFA premiership was decided by the best overall record for the season. In the event of a tie, a playoff match would have been held, which happened three times (1900, 1902 and 1904). Starting this season, the MJFA used the Argus finals system, which introduced a two-week finals series and gave the club that finished first on the ladder at the end of the home-and-away season (the minor premiers) the right to challenge the winner of the finals series for the premiership.

=== Semi-finals ===
	Semi-finals
Saturday, 4 September	South Yarra 8.6 (54)	def.	University 2nd 3.12 (30)	Richmond Cricket Ground
Saturday, 4 September	Beverley 9.12 (66)	def.	Leopold 8.5 (53)	Princes Park

=== Grand Final ===
1909 MJFA Grand Final
Saturday, 11 September (1:00pm)	South Yarra	def.	Beverley	Melbourne Cricket Ground
1.1 (7); 3.2 (20); 4.5 (29); 6.10 (46)	Q1; Q2; Q3; Final	1.2 (8); 2.4 (16); 3.7 (25); 3.7 (25)
Goals	Yeo 2, T. Collins
Armstrong, Atkins, Corbett, James, King, Richardson, Sweetland, Thompson, Wilson	Best	Lacey, Yeo, M. Collins, Wilson, Irwin, Thorp
The grand final was held as a curtain raiser to the Victorian Football League (VFL) semi-final between Carlton and Essendon.
