= 1902 Hawthorn Football Club season =

Hawthorn Football Club
1902 MJFA season
- Home ground: Hawthorn Cricket Ground
- Home-and-away season: 6–10 (6th)
- Grand Final: Did not qualify

The 1902 Hawthorn Football Club season was the inaugural season of the Hawthorn Football Club. The club was formed in April 1902 and was admitted into the Metropolitan Junior Football Association (MJFA) several weeks later.

Hawthorn's first-ever game was a four-point loss to St Ignatius in round 1. The club's first win came in round 4, defeating Celtic by 18 points. At the end of the season, Hawthorn finished sixth on the ladder with a 6−10 win-loss record.

== 1902 playing squad ==
1902 Hawthorn Football Club squad
List		Coaching staff
J. Gardner; Coucher; Trott; Carroll; Poole; Cole; Dungan; Watson; Evans	Warcy; Bishop; Griffin; Boxhall; Hollingsworth; Kosky; Gibb; Percy Abercrombie	Legend: (c) Captain(s); (vc) Vice-captain(s); Updated: 23 December 2024; Source(s):

== Season summary ==
=== Results ===
Rd	Date and local time	Opponent	**Scores** (Hawthorn's scores indicated in **bold**)			Venue	Record	Ref
Rd	Date and local time	Opponent	Home	Away	Result	Venue	Record	Ref
1	Saturday, 3 May (2:30pm)	St Ignatius	3.9 (27)	**3.5 (23)**	Lost by 4 points	Richmond City Reserve (A)	0–1	
2	Saturday, 10 May	Caulfield	5.12 (42)	**10.11 (71)**	Lost by 29 points	Hawthorn Cricket Ground (H)	0–2	
3	Saturday, 17 May	Leopold	8.15 (63)	**1.8 (14)**	Lost by 48 points	Warehousemen's Cricket Ground (A)	0–3	
4	Saturday, 24 May	Celtic	**5.14 (44)**	3.8 (26)	Won by 18 points	Hawthorn Cricket Ground (H)	1–3	
5	Saturday, 31 May	Brighton	7.12 (55)	**7.2 (44)**	Lost by 11 points	Brighton Beach Oval (A)	1–4	
6	Saturday, 7 June	Collegians	9.18 (72)	**1.1 (7)**	Lost by 65 points	St Kilda Cricket Ground (A)	1–5	
7	Saturday, 14 June	Bye						
8	Saturday, 21 June	Caulfield	10.15 (75)	**7.8 (50)**	Lost by 25 points	Caulfield Park (A)	1–6	
9	Saturday, 28 June	Beverley	2.1 (13)	**5.11 (41)**	Won by 28 points	Richmond City Reserve (A)	2–6	
10	Saturday, 5 July	South Yarra	**5.6 (36)**	8.7 (55)	Lost by 19 points	Hawthorn Cricket Ground (H)	2–7	
11	Saturday, 12 July	Celtic	N/A		Won via walkover	East Melbourne Cricket Ground (A)	3–7	
12	Saturday, 19 July	Bye						
13	Saturday, 26 July	Brighton	**2.2 (14)**	11.9 (75)	Lost by 61 points	Hawthorn Cricket Ground (H)	3–8	
14	Saturday, 2 August	Richmond	**8.15 (63)**	2.2 (14)	Won by 49 points	Hawthorn Cricket Ground (H)	4–8	
15	Saturday, 16 August	Leopold	**5.10 (40)**	5.4 (34)	Won by 6 points	Hawthorn Cricket Ground (H)	5–8	
16	Saturday, 23 August	St Ignatius	**13.17 (95)**	1.5 (11)	Won by 84 points	Hawthorn Cricket Ground (H)	6–8	
17	Saturday, 30 August	Collegians	3.4 (22)	6.18 (54)	Lost by 32 points	Hawthorn Cricket Ground (H)	6–9	
18	Saturday, 6 September	South Yarra	9.11 (65)	**2.2 (14)**	Lost by 51 points	Fawkner Park (A)	6–10	
19	Saturday, 13 September	Bye						

=== Ladder ===
Total games "played" and "won" includes all walkover victories over Celtic.

Pos	Team	Pld	W	L	D	GF	GA	Pts
1	Collegians **(P)**	16	15	1	0	143	51	60
2	Brighton	16	15	1	0	123	50	60
3	Caulfield	16	10	6	0	103	107	40
4	South Yarra	16	9	6	1	93	83	38
5	Leopold	16	9	7	0	110	73	36
6	Hawthorn	16	6	10	0	72	94	24
7	Beverley	16	4	11	1	48	92	18
8	St Ignatius	16	3	13	0	25	35	12
−	Celtic **(W)**	8	0	8	0	16	40	0

(P) Premiers; (W) Club withdrew

== See also ==
- 1902 MJFA season
- List of Hawthorn Football Club seasons
