= 1910 MJFA season =

19th season of the Metropolitan Junior Football Association

- Date: 30 April – 24 September 1910
- Teams: 10
- Premiers: Leopold; 3rd premiership
- Minor premiers: Carlton District; 2nd minor premiership
- Wooden spooners: Oakleigh; 2nd wooden spoon

The 1910 MJFA season, also known as the 1910 MFA season, was the 19th season of the Metropolitan Junior Football Association (MJFA). (Note: In 1900, the Metropolitan Junior Football Association (MJFA, now VAFA) decided on a change of name to the Metropolitan Football Association (MFA). MJFA president Lawrence Adamson brokered a deal that the existing MFA (of 1899) became the MJFA, giving his MJFA (of 1892) the "Metropolitan Football Association" name. Despite this, various newspaper reports from 1900 until 1912 still use the MJFA name when referring to Adamson's competition, most consensus is that "MJFA" in this time period refers to the now-VAFA, and the VAFA's official history continues to use the MJFA name until 1912.) The season began on 30 April and concluded on 24 September, comprising an 18-match home-and-away season, followed by a three-week finals series.

Leopold won the MJFA premiership for the first time, defeating Carlton District in the 1910 MJFA Grand Final.

== Ladder ==
Pos	Team	Pld	W	L	D	PF	PA	PP	Pts	Qualification
1	Carlton District	18	15	3	0	1488	715	207.8	60	Finals series
2	Leopold (P)	18	14	4	0	1362	679		56	Finals series
3	South Yarra	18	14	4	0	1217	758		56	Finals series
4	Beverley	18	13	5	0	1151	898		52	Finals series
5	Collingwood District	18	12	6	0	1253	874		48	
6	University 2nd	18	8	10	0	1203	935		32	
7	Collegians	18	7	11	0	1014	1102		28	
8	Hawthorn	18	3	15	0	717	1374		12	
9	Caulfield	18	2	16	0	680	1465		8	
10	Oakleigh	18	2	16	0	614	1827		8	

(P) Premiers; (W) Club withdrew

== Finals ==
At the time, the MJFA used the Argus finals system, which gave the club that finished first on the ladder at the end of the home-and-away season (the minor premiers) the right to challenge the winner of the finals series for the premiership.

=== Semi-finals ===
	Semi-finals
Saturday, 10 September	Leopold 6.15 (51)	def.	South Yarra 2.8 (20)	Melbourne Cricket Ground
Saturday, 10 September	Carlton District 4.13 (37)	def.	Beverley 4.6 (30)	North Melbourne Cricket Ground

=== Preliminary final ===
	Preliminary final
Saturday, 17 September	Carlton District 5.3 (33)	def. by	Leopold 6.15 (51)	Melbourne Cricket Ground
Leopold player Hughes was suspended until the end of May 1911 for misconduct.

=== Grand Final ===
1910 MJFA Grand Final
Saturday, 24 September (1:00pm)	Carlton District	def. by	Leopold	Melbourne Cricket Ground
3.0 (18); 4.1 (25); 4.3 (27); 4.6 (30)	Q1; Q2; Q3; Final	1.2 (8); 4.5 (29); 8.6 (54); 10.9 (69)
Johnson 2, Hodgkins, Rowe	Goals
Allen, Rutter, Evans, Rowe, Kirkpatrick, Jackson, Johnson, Gardiner, Triplett, Chalmers, Schunke	Best	Mullaly, Lambert, Radamacker, Landy, Sevior, O'Donohue, Oliver, Russick, Dow, Kelly, Collison, Sloane
The grand final was held as a curtain raiser to the Victorian Football League (VFL) preliminary-final between Collingwood and South Melbourne.

== Notable events ==
- Round 2, originally scheduled for 7 May, was postponed by one week, and remaining rounds pushed back by one week, due to the death of King Edward VII on 6 May. The MJFA's decision followed the same actions from the Victorian Football League and the Victorian Football Association.
