= 1920 MAFA season =

25th season of the Metropolitan Amateur Football Association

- Date: 15 May – September 1920
- Teams: 8
- Premiers: Elsternwick; 1st premiership
- Minor premiers: Elsternwick; 1st minor premiership

The 1920 MAFA season was the 25th season of the Metropolitan Amateur Football Association (MAFA), an Australian rules football competition played in the state of Victoria. The season began on 15 May and concluded sometime in September, comprising a 13-match home-and-away season, followed by a one-week finals series.

Elsternwick won the MAFA premiership for the first time, while Collegians finished as runners-up.

This was the first MAFA season to be held following World War I, which had forced the curtailing of the 1915 season and the cancellation of the 1916, 1917, 1918 and 1919 seasons.

== Background ==
=== Association return ===
The 1915 season was curtailed due to the impacts of World War I, which had seen 164 MJFA players enlisted in the Australian Army by 30 July 1915.

Following the early conclusion of the season, officials from the Victorian Football League (VFL) sought to have the MAFA become a reserves competition to the VFL for the 1916 season. At least two clubs – Beverley and South Yarra – reported the MAFA that they had been "approached" about becoming reserves teams to Richmond and St Kilda respectively. The MAFA announced in late 1915 that they would not resume competition until the war had ended, while also stating that they were not prepared to be absorbed by the VFL.

In 1917, the MAFA stated it had received applications from clubs to enter once the war was over, although the exact clubs that applied are unknown. Clubs already in the MAFA were advised by officials to keep in touch with their members "so as to be in a position to appoint representatives to deal with important matters immediately the game is resumed". Although the war ended in November 1918, the 1919 season was also cancelled.

On 22 March 1920, the MAFA decided at a meeting to resume competition.

== Association membership ==
Four clubs that had competed in the 1915 season (Collegians, Elsternwick, South Yarra and University) remained in the MAFA, while another four clubs entered the competition for the first time in 1920. The Beverley Football Club did not return to the MAFA, although it still existed and was likely in recess at the time.

Carlton District, Caulfield, Collingwood District, Leopold and University moved to the newly-formed Victorian Junior Football League (VJFL) in 1919, although Caulfield withdrew prior to the start of the season. Caulfield then attempted to rejoin the MAFA, but their application was refused as the club's reputation was seen as "intolerable" prior to the war. University entered two teams in the VJFL in 1919 – University A and University B – but University B returned to the MAFA in 1920.

Melbourne Swimming Club, which had previously played scratch matches, joined the MAFA. The newly-formed Teachers College Football Club, Old Caulfield Grammarians Football Club and Old Melburnians Football Club also entered teams.

== Home-and-away season ==
=== Round 1 ===
	Round 1
Saturday, 15 May	Old Melburnians 10.15 (75)	def.	South Yarra 4.7 (31)	Melbourne Grammar School
Saturday, 15 May	Collegians 7.11 (53)	def.	Old Caulfield Grammarians 6.14 (50)	Wesley College
Saturday, 15 May	Melbourne Swimming Club 2.6 (18)	def. by	Teachers College 9.10 (64)	Training College Ground, Carlton
Saturday, 15 May	Elsternwick 6.18 (54)	def.	University B 4.5 (29)	Elsternwick Park
The Argus wrote that "the day was not a good one for football" and "there was little display of the brilliant football which was characteristic of the association in pre-war days".; These were the first MAFA games in 1,743 days (or 4 years, 9 months, 8 days); the most recent prior to this having been the 1915 grand final between Collingwood District and Leopold on 7 August 1915.

=== Round 2 ===
	Round 2
Saturday, 22 May	University B 7.14 (56)	def.	Old Melburnians 5.7 (37)
Saturday, 22 May	Old Caulfield Grammarians 12.17 (89)	def.	Teachers College 3.7 (25)
Saturday, 22 May	Collegians 18.15 (123)	def.	Melbourne Swimming Club 5.9 (39)
	Bye; Elsternwick, South Yarra

=== Round 3 ===
	Round 3
Saturday, 29 May	Elsternwick 16.13 (109)	def.	Melbourne Swimming Club 12.15 (87)
Saturday, 29 May	Old Melburnians 7.8 (50)	def. by	Old Caulfield Grammarians 21.14 (140)
Saturday, 29 May	Teachers College ?.? (?)	v	University B ?.? (?)
Saturday, 29 May	Collegians 18.10 (118)	def.	South Yarra 6.4 (40)

== Ladder ==
Pos	Team	Pld	W	L	D	Pts	Qualification
1	Elsternwick (P)	13	12	1	0	48	Finals series
2	Collegians	13	11	2	0	44	Finals series
3	Old Caulfield Grammarians	13	8			32	Finals series
4	Old Melburnians	13	7			28	Finals series
	Melbourne Swimming Club	13					
	South Yarra	13					
	Teachers College	13					
	University B	13					

(P) Premiers

== Finals ==
It appears that no finals series was held in 1920, although the Victorian Amateur Football Association (VAFA, formerly MAFA) claims a grand final did take place. When announcing the competition would resume, the MAFA stated that "there will be no semi-final or final matches".

The 1920 home-and-away season concluded on 23 August, a date on which only saw two games were played. The Herald wrote on 27 August that "notice of motion has been given that finals be played in this association's competition," adding that "the proposal will be considered at the next meeting of the association". However, at that meeting (held between 31 August and 3 September), it was reported that the MJFA "had completed this season's programme". While no contemporary sources indicate semi-finals or a grand final were held in 1920, the VAFA states that Elsternwick defeated Collegians by 31 points in a grand final, winning 11.1 (67) to 5.6 (36).

At the time, the MAFA used the Argus finals system, which gave the club that finished first on the ladder at the end of the home-and-away season (the minor premiers) the right to challenge the winner of the finals series for the premiership. Ordinarily, this would mean that first-placed Elsternwick would play fourth-placed Old Melburnians, and second-placed Collegians would play third-placed Old Caulfield Grammarians, with the winners of the semi-finals playing in a grand final. However, it appears the 1920 season used the pre-1909 method of the premiers being decided based on the best overall record for the season.

== Notable events ==
- The MAFA joined the Amateur Sporting Federation, which saw the competition recognised as the "senior authority in amateur football".
- J. V. Deane was unable to continue as the MAFA secretary, and was replaced by S. Hughes.
- A representative match requested by the Melbourne District Football Association (MDFA) was not agreed to by the MAFA, and did not go ahead.
