= 1906 MJFA season =

15th season of the Metropolitan Junior Football Association

- Teams: 10
- Premiers: University; 1st premiership
- Minor premiers: University; 1st minor premiership
- Wooden spooners: Beverley; 3rd wooden spoon

The 1906 MJFA season, also known as the 1906 MFA season, was the 15th season of the Metropolitan Junior Football Association (MJFA). (Note: In 1900, the Metropolitan Junior Football Association (MJFA, now VAFA) decided on a change of name to the Metropolitan Football Association (MFA). MJFA president Lawrence Adamson brokered a deal that the existing MFA (of 1899) became the MJFA, giving his MJFA (of 1892) the "Metropolitan Football Association" name. Despite this, various newspaper reports from 1900 until 1912 still use the MJFA name when referring to Adamson's competition, most consensus is that "MJFA" in this time period refers to the now-VAFA, and the VAFA's official history continues to use the MJFA name until 1912.)

University won the MJFA premiership for the first time, finishing first on the ladder with only one loss for the entire season.

== Association membership ==
All nine teams that participated in the 1905 MJFA season continued in 1906. Two clubs changed their names – the Fitzroy District Football Club moved its home ground to Victoria Park and changed its name to Collingwood District, while Hawthorn changed its official name to the Hawthorn City Football Club as a result of Glenferrie Oval opening (although the club continued to be known simply as Hawthorn).

== Ladder ==
Pos	Team	Pld	W	L	D	Pts
1	University (P)	18	17	1	0	68
2	Collegians	18	16	2	0	64
3	South Yarra	18	12	6	0	48
4	Leopold	18	12	6	0	48
5	Brighton	18	10	8	0	40
6	Collingwood District	18	7	11	0	28
7	Port Rovers	18	6	12	0	24
8	Hawthorn	18	5	13	0	20
9	Caulfield	18	3	15	0	12
10	Beverley	18	2	12	0	8

(P) Premiers; (W) Club withdrew
