= 1912 MAFA season =

21st season of the Metropolitan Amateur Football Association

- Date: 27 April – 14 September 1912
- Teams: 10
- Premiers: Beverley; 1st premiership
- Minor premiers: Beverley; 1st minor premiership
- Wooden spooners: Caulfield

The 1912 MAFA season was the 21st season of the Metropolitan Amateur Football Association (MAFA). The season began on 27 April and concluded on 14 September, comprising an 18-match home-and-away season, followed by a two-week finals series.

Beverley won the MAFA premiership for the first time, defeating South Yarra in the 1912 MJFA Grand Final.

This was the first season under the MAFA name, with the competition renamed from the Metropolitan Junior Football Association (MJFA) following the conclusion of the 1911 season. (Note: In 1900, the Metropolitan Junior Football Association (MJFA, now VAFA) decided on a change of name to the Metropolitan Football Association (MFA). MJFA president Lawrence Adamson brokered a deal that the existing MFA (of 1899) became the MJFA, giving his MJFA (of 1892) the "Metropolitan Football Association" name. Despite this, various newspaper reports from 1900 until 1912 still use the MJFA name when referring to Adamson's competition, most consensus is that "MJFA" in this time period refers to the now-VAFA, and the VAFA's official history continues to use the MJFA name until 1912.)

== Association membership ==
Like the previous season in 1911, a total of ten teams competed in the MAFA. Oakleigh, which had finished last on the ladder in the past three seasons, left the competition. The Fitzroy Juniors, which won the 1911 Victorian Junior Football Association (VJFA) premiership, was admitted into the MAFA.

Prior to the start of the season, Hawthorn merged with the Hawthorn Rovers, a successful junior club, changing to a gold guernsey with a blue "V" of the Rovers. The club also changed its official name to "Hawthorn City", the same name it had briefly changed to in 1906.

=== VFL affiliations ===
Starting this season, the majority of clubs developed formal reserves affiliations with senior clubs that were competing in the Victorian Football League (VFL), with the exception of Caulfield and Collegians. Some clubs, including Carlton District and Collingwood District, already had established relationships with senior clubs.

The affiliations were as follows:

- Beverley with Richmond
- Carlton District with Carlton
- Collingwood District with Collingwood
- Fitzroy Juniors with Fitzroy
- Hawthorn with Melbourne
- Leopold with South Melbourne
- South Yarra with St Kilda
- University 2nd with University

== Ladder ==
Pos	Team	Pld	W	L	D	Pts	Qualification
1	Beverley (P)	18	16	1	1	66	Finals series
2	Carlton District	18	14	4	0	56	Finals series
3	South Yarra	18	12	5	1	50	Finals series
4	Leopold	18	12	6	0	48	Finals series
5	Hawthorn	18	10	8	0	40	
6	Fitzroy Juniors	18	9	9	0	36	
7	Collegians	18	7	11	0	28	
8	Collingwood District	18	5	13	0	20	
9	University 2nd	18	3	15	0	12	
10	Caulfield	18	1	17	0	4	

(P) Premiers; (W) Club withdrew

== Finals ==
At the time, the MAFA used the Argus finals system, which gave the club that finished first on the ladder at the end of the home-and-away season (the minor premiers) the right to challenge the winner of the finals series for the premiership.

=== Semi-finals ===
	Semi-finals
Saturday, 7 September (1:00pm)	Beverley 8.11 (59)	def.	Leopold 3.4 (22)	Melbourne Cricket Ground
Saturday, 7 September	Carlton District 5.9 (39)	def. by	South Yarra 7.21 (63)	Richmond Cricket Ground

=== Grand Final ===
1912 MAFA Grand Final
Saturday, 14 September (1:00pm)	Beverley	def.	South Yarra	Melbourne Cricket Ground
2.2 (14); 2.5 (17); 4.7 (31); 7.9 (51)	Q1; Q2; Q3; Final	1.0 (6); 1.1 (7); 3.2 (20); 4.4 (28)
Irwin 2, Enright 2, McDougall, Richardson, Morgan	Goals	Richardson 3, Sandford
Landemann, Lang, Morgan, Satchwell, Lacey, Yeo, Richardson, Edwards, McKeone	Best	Edgar, Atkins, Richardson, Christian, Sandford, Pawsey, Cooper
The grand final was held as a curtain raiser to the Victorian Football League (VFL) semi-final between Essendon and South Melbourne.
