= 1914 MAFA season =

23rd season of the Metropolitan Amateur Football Association

- Date: 26 April – 19 September 1914
- Teams: 10
- Premiers: South Yarra; 3rd premiership
- Minor premiers: South Yarra; 3rd minor premiership

The 1914 MAFA season was the 23rd season of the Metropolitan Amateur Football Association (MAFA), an Australian rules football competition played in the state of Victoria. The season began on 26 April and concluded on 19 September, comprising an 18-match home-and-away season, followed by a three-week finals series.

South Yarra won the MAFA premiership for the third time, defeating Collingwood District by 22 points in the 1914 MAFA Grand Final.

== Association membership ==
At the end of the 1913 season, Hawthorn applied and was admitted into the Victorian Football Association (VFA), leaving the MAFA. They were replaced by Elsternwick, which had been competing in the Federal Football Association (FFA), keeping the size of the MAFA at 10 clubs.

== Ladder ==
Pos	Team	Pld	W	L	D	Pts	Qualification
1	South Yarra (P)	18	16	2	0	64	Finals series
2	Collingwood District	18	15	3	0	60	Finals series
3	Leopold	18	12	6	0	48	Finals series
4	Fitzroy Juniors	18	11	7	0	44	Finals series
5	Collegians	18	9	9	0	36	
6	Elsternwick	17	8	8	1	34	
7	Carlton District	18	6	11	1	26	
8	Beverley	18	5	11	2	24	
9	Caulfield	18	3	15	0	12	
10	University 2nd	17	2	15	0	8	

(P) Premiers

== Finals ==
At the time, the MAFA used the Argus finals system, which gave the club that finished first on the ladder at the end of the home-and-away season (the minor premiers) the right to challenge the winner of the finals series for the premiership.

Although they lost the semi-final to Fitzroy Juniors, South Yarra had the right to challenge. Thus, Collingwood District (who defeated Leopold in the other semi-final) played Fitzroy Juniors in a preliminary final, with the winner of that match playing South Yarra in the grand final.

=== Semi-finals ===
	Semi-finals
Saturday, 5 September (1:00pm)	Collingwood District 8.10 (58)	def.	Leopold 6.9 (45)	Melbourne Cricket Ground
Saturday, 5 September	South Yarra 5.12 (42)	def. by	Fitzroy Juniors 9.11 (65)	Victoria Park

=== Preliminary final ===
	Preliminary final
Saturday, 12 September (1:00pm)	Collingwood District 11.16 (82)	def.	Fitzroy Juniors 2.9 (21)	Melbourne Cricket Ground

=== Grand Final ===
1914 MAFA Grand Final
Saturday, 19 September (1:00pm)	South Yarra	def.	Collingwood District	Melbourne Cricket Ground
2.8 (20) 8.15 (63)	Q1; Q2; Q3; Final	2.6 (18) 5.11 (41)
Moyes 4	Goals
Moyes, Rudd, Phillips, Flintoftt, Marshall, E. James, J. James	Best	Penrose, McCarthy, Downs, Mutch, Reilly, Farnan, Waterson, O'Keefe, Kerlie, Gray, Franklin
Reports	Unnamed player (striking)
The grand final was held as a curtain raiser to the Victorian Football League (VFL) preliminary final between South Melbourne and Carlton.

==== Teams ====
South Yarra
B:	Bryne	Hart	Carbarns
HB:	Harris	Plowman	Sweetland
C:	Sandford	Christian	E. James
HF:	Hanson	Richardson	Hosking
F:	Flintoff	Moyes	Phillips
Foll:	Rudd	Marshall (c)	J. James

Collingwood District
B:	Charlie Mutch	A. Andrews	Arthur Joseph
HB:	Ernie Tait	Roy Franklin	Bert Thorpe
C:	Roy Waterson (c)	Johnny Downs	Bert Roberts
HF:	Harry Kerley	Con McCarthy	Pat Farnan
F:	L.P. Reilly	Fades	Jack Hutchinson
Foll:	Thomas O'Keefe	Roy Gray	Arthur Penrose

== Notable events ==
- A match in August between Beverley and Leopold had a delayed start after the central umpire appointed for the match was unable to attend. Beverley allowed "one of the Leopold men" to act as central umpire, assisted by two boundary umpires.
- South Yarra full-forward Moyes kicked close to 70 goals for the 1914 season.
