= 1911 MJFA season =

20th season of the Metropolitan Junior Football Association

- Date: 29 April – 16 September 1911
- Teams: 10
- Premiers: Leopold; 4th premiership
- Minor premiers: Leopold; 3rd minor premiership
- Wooden spooners: Oakleigh; 3rd wooden spoon

The 1911 MJFA season, also known as the 1911 MFA season, was the 20th season of the Metropolitan Junior Football Association (MJFA). (Note: In 1900, the Metropolitan Junior Football Association (MJFA, now VAFA) decided on a change of name to the Metropolitan Football Association (MFA). MJFA president Lawrence Adamson brokered a deal that the existing MFA (of 1899) became the MJFA, giving his MJFA (of 1892) the "Metropolitan Football Association" name. Despite this, various newspaper reports from 1900 until 1912 still use the MJFA name when referring to Adamson's competition, most consensus is that "MJFA" in this time period refers to the now-VAFA, and the VAFA's official history continues to use the MJFA name until 1912.) The season began on 8 April and concluded on 17 September, comprising an 18-match home-and-away season, followed by a three-week finals series.

Leopold won the MJFA premiership for the fourth time and the second year in a row, defeating Collegians in the 1911 MJFA Grand Final.

This was the last season under the MJFA/MFA name, with the competition renamed to the Metropolitan Amateur Football Association (MAFA) in 1912.

== Ladder ==
Pos	Team	Pld	W	L	D	Pts	Qualification
1	Leopold (P)	18	17	1	0	68	Finals series
2	Beverley	18	14	4	0	56	Finals series
3	Collegians	18	14	4	0	56	Finals series
4	South Yarra	18	12	5	1	50	Finals series
5	Collingwood District	18	11	7	0	44	
6	Carlton District	18	8	9	1	34	
7	University 2nd	18	6	12	0	24	
8	Caulfield	18	4	14	0	16	
9	Hawthorn	18	3	15	0	12	
10	Oakleigh	18	0	18	0	0	

(P) Premiers; (W) Club withdrew

== Finals ==
At the time, the MJFA used the Argus finals system, which gave the club that finished first on the ladder at the end of the home-and-away season (the minor premiers) the right to challenge the winner of the finals series for the premiership.

=== Semi-finals ===
	Semi-finals
Saturday, 9 September (1:00pm)	Beverley 9.10 (64)	def. by	Collegians 12.7 (79)	Melbourne Cricket Ground
Saturday, 9 September (3:00pm)	Leopold 11.15 (81)	def.	South Yarra 5.9 (39)	Victoria Park

=== Grand Final ===
1911 MJFA Grand Final
Saturday, 16 September	Leopold	def.	Collegians	Melbourne Cricket Ground
0.0 (0); 1.6 (12); 5.8 (38); 11.11 (77)	Q1; Q2; Q3; Final	6.5 (41); 7.6 (48); 7.7 (49); 7.9 (51)
Keggin 4, Sloane 2, Russick 2, Kelly 2, Charge	Goals	Park 2, Kaigin, Gravenall, Willis, Grieve, Fox
Heavy wind in the first quarter saw Leopold unable to score. At one point during the second quarter, Collegians led 7.6 (48) to 0.1 (1).; The grand final was held as a curtain raiser to the Victorian Football League (VFL) preliminary-final between Essendon and Carlton.
