= 1908 MJFA season =

17th season of the Metropolitan Junior Football Association

- Date: 2 May – 5 September 1908
- Teams: 10
- Premiers: South Yarra; 1st premiership
- Minor premiers: South Yarra; 1st minor premiership

The 1908 MJFA season, also known as the 1908 MFA season, was the 17th season of the Metropolitan Junior Football Association (MJFA). (Note: In 1900, the Metropolitan Junior Football Association (MJFA, now VAFA) decided on a change of name to the Metropolitan Football Association (MFA). MJFA president Lawrence Adamson brokered a deal that the existing MFA (of 1899) became the MJFA, giving his MJFA (of 1892) the "Metropolitan Football Association" name. Despite this, various newspaper reports from 1900 until 1912 still use the MJFA name when referring to Adamson's competition, most consensus is that "MJFA" in this time period refers to the now-VAFA, and the VAFA's official history continues to use the MJFA name until 1912.)

South Yarra won the MJFA premiership for the first time, finishing first on the ladder after going undefeated for the entire season. This was the last MJFA season to not have a finals series, with the Argus system introduced in 1909.

== Association membership ==
Like the previous season in 1907, a total of ten teams competed in the MJFA. Brighton left to join the Victorian Football Association (VFA), while University joined the Victorian Football League (VFL).

Carlton District and Oakleigh both applied to enter the MJFA. By "a very narrow majority", Oakleigh's application was accepted. University also entered a reserves team (University 2nd), which it had previously done in 1893.

== Ladder ==
Pos	Team	Pld	W	L	D	PF	PA	Pts
1	South Yarra (P)	18	18	0	0	1419	512	72
2	Leopold	18	16	2	0			64
3	Collegians	18	13	5	0			52
4	University 2nd	18	10	7	1			42
5	Beverley	18	9	8	1			38
6	Oakleigh	18	6	11	1			26
7	Hawthorn	18	6	12	0			24
8	Port Rovers	18	4	12	2			20
9	Collingwood District	18	4	14	0			16
10	Caulfield	18	1	16	1			6

(P) Premiers; (W) Club withdrew
