= 1902 MJFA season =

11th season of the Metropolitan Junior Football Association

- Date: 3 May − 20 September 1902
- Teams: 9
- Premiers: Collegians; 5th premiership

The 1902 MJFA season, also known as the 1902 MFA season, was the eleventh season of the Metropolitan Junior Football Association (MJFA). (Note: In 1900, the Metropolitan Junior Football Association (MJFA, now VAFA) decided on a change of name to the Metropolitan Football Association (MFA). MJFA president Lawrence Adamson brokered a deal that the existing MFA (of 1899) became the MJFA, giving his MJFA (of 1892) the "Metropolitan Football Association" name. Despite this, various newspaper reports from 1900 until 1912 still use the MJFA name when referring to Adamson's competition, most consensus is that "MJFA" in this time period refers to the now-VAFA, and the VAFA's official history continues to use the MJFA name until 1912.)

Collegians won the premiership for the fifth time, after defeating Brighton in the 1902 MJFA Grand Final. This was the second time a grand final had been held in the MJFA.

== Association membership ==
All eight teams that participated in the 1901 MJFA season continued in 1902. One new club, the Hawthorn Football Club, was formed in April 1902 and admitted into the Association several weeks later, bringing the total number of teams to nine.

=== Celtic withdrawal ===
In round 7, the Celtic Football Club was scheduled to play a match against Beverley. However, Beverley won after Celtic forfeited.

Celtic had a bye the following week in round 8, but was scheduled to play Brighton in round 9. However, "owing to a misunderstanding", Celtic did not state where the game was supposed to be played. The match was eventually called off, and Brighton claimed a walkover victory. Celtic disbanded the following week, prior to a scheduled match against Caulfield at the East Melbourne Cricket Ground, having lost all of its eight games.

== Home-and-away season ==
=== Round 1 ===
	Round 1
Saturday, 3 May	Caulfield 9.15 (69)	def.	Celtic 2.7 (19)	Caulfield Cricket Ground
Saturday, 3 May	Collegians 17.19 (121)	def.	South Yarra 4.3 (27)	St Kilda Cricket Ground
Saturday, 3 May	Leopold 2.18 (30)	def. by	Brighton 6.4 (40)	Warehousemen's Cricket Ground
Saturday, 3 May (2:30pm)	St Ignatius 3.9 (27)	def.	Hawthorn 3.5 (23)	Richmond City Reserve
	Bye; Beverley

=== Round 2 ===
	Round 2
Saturday, 10 May	Brighton 9.14 (68)	def.	St Ignatius 2.8 (20)	Brighton
Saturday, 10 May	Hawthorn 5.12 (42)	def. by	Caulfield 10.11 (71)	St James Park, Hawthorn
Saturday, 10 May	Celtic 1.1 (7)	def. by	Collegians 11.27 (93)	East Melbourne Cricket Ground
Saturday, 10 May	Beverley 2.8 (29)	def. by	Leopold 6.13 (49)	Richmond City Reserve
	Bye; South Yarra

=== Round 3 ===
	Round 3
Saturday, 17 May	Caulfield 6.9 (45)	def. by	Collegians 14.16 (100)	Caulfield Cricket Ground
Saturday, 17 May	Leopold 8.15 (63)	def.	Hawthorn 1.8 (14)	Warehousemen's Cricket Ground
Saturday, 17 May	South Yarra 4.1 (25)	drew with	Beverley 2.13 (25)	Toorak Park
Saturday, 17 May	St Ignatius 4.14 (38)	def.	Celtic 4.6 (30)	Richmond City Reserve
	Bye; Brighton

=== Round 4 ===
	Round 4
Saturday, 24 May	Beverley 4.12 (36)	def.	St Ignatius 1.7 (13)	Richmond City Reserve
Saturday, 24 May	Hawthorn 5.14 (44)	def.	Celtic 3.8 (26)	Hawthorn Cricket Ground
Saturday, 24 May	Brighton 13.13 (91)	def.	Caulfield 7.8 (50)	Caulfield Cricket Ground
Saturday, 24 May	Leopold 9.12 (66)	def.	South Yarra 2.5 (17)	Warehousemen's Cricket Ground
	Bye; Collegians
This was the first-ever match won by the Hawthorn Football Club.

=== Round 5 ===
	Round 5
Saturday, 31 May	Brighton 7.12 (55)	def.	Hawthorn 7.2 (44)	Brighton
Saturday, 31 May	South Yarra 6.10 (46)	def.	Celtic 3.7 (25)	Toorak Park
Saturday, 31 May	St Ignatius 2.3 (15)	def. by	Collegians 5.13 (43)	Richmond City Reserve
Saturday, 31 May	Caulfield 3.12 (30)	def.	Beverley 3.7 (25)	Caulfield Park
	Bye; Leopold

=== Round 6 ===
	Round 6
Saturday, 7 June	Collegians 9.18 (72)	def.	Hawthorn 1.1 (7)	St Kilda Cricket Ground
Saturday, 7 June	Caulfield 8.9 (57)	def.	South Yarra 3.5 (23)	Caulfield Cricket Ground
Saturday, 7 June	Beverley 3.8 (26)	def. by	Brighton 6.13 (49)	Richmond City Reserve
Saturday, 7 June	Celtic 0.1 (1)	def. by	Leopold 8.8 (62)	East Melbourne Cricket Ground
	Bye; St Ignatius

=== Round 7 ===
	Round 7
Saturday, 14 June	Brighton 11.12 (78)	def.	South Yarra 1.1 (7)	Brighton
Saturday, 14 June	Leopold 7.6 (48)	def. by	Collegians 9.8 (62)	Warehouseman's Cricket Ground
Saturday, 14 June	St Ignatius 3.4 (22)	def. by	Caulfield 3.19 (37)	Richmond City Reserve
Saturday, 14 June	Beverley	def.	Celtic
	Bye; Hawthorn
Beverley defeated Celtic via walkover.

=== Round 8 ===
	Round 8
Saturday, 21 June	Collegians 4.4 (25)	def.	Brighton 0.6 (6)	St Kilda Cricket Ground
Saturday, 21 June	St Ignatius 2.9 (21)	def. by	South Yarra 4.10 (34)	Richmond City Reserve
Saturday, 21 June	Leopold 4.8 (32)	def.	Beverley 2.1 (13)	Warehouseman's Cricket Ground
Saturday, 21 June	Caulfield 10.15 (75)	def.	Hawthorn 7.8 (50)	Caulfield Park
	Bye; Celtic

=== Round 9 ===
	Round 9
Saturday, 28 June	South Yarra 7.3 (45)	def. by	Collegians 8.12 (60)	Toorak Park
Saturday, 28 June	Beverley 2.1 (13)	def. by	Hawthorn 5.11 (41)	Richmond City Reserve
Saturday, 28 June	Leopold 8.10 (58)	def.	Caulfield 8.3 (51)	Warehouseman's Cricket Ground
Saturday, 28 June	Celtic	def. by	Brighton
	Bye; St Ignatius
Brighton defeated Celtic via walkover.

=== Round 10 ===
	Round 10
Saturday, 5 July	Hawthorn 5.6 (36)	def. by	South Yarra 8.7 (55)	Hawthorn Cricket Ground
Saturday, 5 July	Collegians 10.19 (79)	def.	Beverley 3.3 (21)	St Kilda Cricket Ground
Saturday, 5 July	St Ignatius 1.2 (8)	def. by	Brighton 13.17 (85)	Richmond City Reserve
	Bye; Caulfield, Leopold

=== Round 11 ===
	Round 11
Saturday, 12 July	Brighton 8.6 (54)	def.	Leopold 6.6 (42)	Brighton Cricket Ground
Saturday, 12 July	South Yarra 8.11 (59)	def.	Caulfield 7.11 (53)	Toorak Park
Saturday, 12 July	Beverley 14.7 (85)	def.	St Ignatius 2.2 (14)	Richmond City Reserve
	Bye; Collegians, Hawthorn

=== Round 12 ===
	Round 12
Saturday, 19 July	Collegians 14.19 (103)	def.	Caulfield 4.4 (28)	St Kilda Cricket Ground
Saturday, 19 July	Brighton 15.13 (103)	def.	Beverley 1.3 (9)	Brighton Cricket Ground
Saturday, 19 July	St Ignatius 1.3 (9)	def. by	Leopold 11.19 (85)	Richmond City Reserve
	Bye; Hawthorn, South Yarra

=== Round 13 ===
	Round 13
Saturday, 26 July	Hawthorn 2.2 (14)	def. by	Brighton 11.9 (75)	Hawthorn Cricket Ground
Saturday, 26 July	South Yarra 13.17 (95)	def.	St Ignatius 1.6 (12)	Toorak Park
Saturday, 26 July	Beverley 4.3 (27)	def. by	Caulfield 3.18 (36)	Richmond City Reserve
	Bye; Collegians, Leopold

=== Round 14 ===
	Round 14
Saturday, 2 August	Collegians 9.8 (62)	def.	Leopold 4.2 (26)	St Kilda Cricket Ground
Saturday, 2 August	Hawthorn 8.15 (63)	def.	Beverley 2.2 (14)	Hawthorn Cricket Ground
Saturday, 2 August	South Yarra 4.4 (28)	def. by	Brighton 3.9 (27)	Wesley College Ground
	Bye; Caulfield, St Ignatius
On 23 August, Brighton was awarded victory over South Yarra on protest after it was found that South Yarra had fielded ineligible players.

=== Round 15 ===
	Round 15
Saturday, 16 August	Hawthorn 5.10 (40)	def.	Leopold 5.4 (34)	Hawthorn Cricket Ground
Saturday, 16 August	Beverley 2.3 (15)	def. by	South Yarra 9.5 (59)	Richmond City Reserve
Saturday, 16 August	Caulfield 9.12 (66)	def.	St Ignatius 0.4 (4)	Caulfield Cricket Ground
	Bye; Brighton, Collegians

=== Round 16 ===
	Round 16
Saturday, 23 August	Brighton 5.8 (38)	def.	Collegians 4.8 (32)	Brighton Cricket Ground
Saturday, 23 August	Hawthorn 13.17 (95)	def.	St Ignatius 1.5 (11)	Hawthorn Cricket Ground
Saturday, 23 August	South Yarra 9.11 (65)	def.	Leopold 6.11 (47)	Toorak Park
	Bye; Beverley, Caulfield

=== Round 17 ===
	Round 17
Saturday, 30 August	Caulfield 5.8 (38)	def. by	Brighton 16.5 (101)	Caulfield Park
Saturday, 30 August	Leopold 17.12 (114)	def.	St Ignatius 2.3 (15)	Richmond City Reserve
Saturday, 30 August	Hawthorn 3.4 (22)	def. by	Collegians 6.18 (54)	Hawthorn Cricket Ground
	Bye; Beverley, South Yarra

=== Round 18 ===
	Round 18
Saturday, 6 September	South Yarra 9.11 (65)	def.	Hawthorn 2.2 (14)	Fawkner Park
Saturday, 6 September	Caulfield 10.7 (67)	def.	Leopold 8.5 (53)	Caulfield Park
Saturday, 6 September	Beverley 3.5 (23)	def. by	Collegians 14.14 (98)	Richmond City Reserve
	Bye; Brighton, St Ignatius

=== Round 19 ===
	Round 19
Saturday, 13 September	Collegians 14.18 (102)	def.	St Ignatius 1.3 (9)	Richmond City Reserve
	Bye; Beverley, Brighton, Caulfield, Hawthorn, Leopold, South Yarra

== Ladder ==
Total games "played" and "won" includes all walkover victories over Celtic.

Pos	Team	Pld	W	L	D	GF	GA	Pts
1	Collegians (P)	16	15	1	0	143	51	60
2	Brighton	16	15	1	0	123	50	60
3	Caulfield	16	10	6	0	103	107	40
4	South Yarra	16	9	6	1	93	83	38
5	Leopold	16	9	7	0	110	73	36
6	Hawthorn	16	6	10	0	72	94	24
7	Beverley	16	4	11	1	48	92	18
8	St Ignatius	16	3	13	0	25	35	12
−	Celtic (W)	8	0	8	0	16	40	0

(P) Premiers; (W) Club withdrew

== Grand Final ==
At the time, the MJFA premiership was decided by the best overall record for the season. In the event of a tie, a playoff match would have been held.

1902 was the second time in MJFA history that such a match was required (the first being in 1900), with Collegians and Brighton finishing with 60 premiership points each.

1902 MJFA Grand Final
Saturday, 20 September	Collegians	def.	Brighton	Victoria Park
1.2 (8); 5.5 (35); 6.6 (42); 9.12 (66)	Q1; Q2; Q3; Final	2.1 (13); 3.2 (20); 5.4 (34); 7.5 (47)	Umpires: Dick Gibson
Greeve 4, Brown 3, Dinsmore, Howell	Goals	Stewart 3, Monkhouse 2
Howell, McKellar, Stewart, Woodhouse, Outen, Laver, Morrow, Greeve, Dinsmore, Brown, Allard	Best	Best, Callan, Todd, Treeby, Clough, Reneuf, Stewart, Cromie, Quinton, Tarrant, Holligan, Monkhouse

== Notable events ==
- A representative match was held on 9 August (after round 14 and before round 15) between the MJFA and Ballarat Junior Football Association (BJFA) at the East Melbourne Cricket Ground. The MJFA defeated the BJFA, with the final score being 11.12 (78) to 6.9 (45). Collegians captain H.J. Stewart captained the MJFA team, with Leopold captain T. Williams serving as vice-captain.

== See also ==
- 1902 Hawthorn Football Club season
