= 1913 MAFA season =

22nd season of the Metropolitan Amateur Football Association

- Date: 27 April – 20 September 1912
- Teams: 10
- Premiers: Leopold; 5th premiership
- Minor premiers: Collingwood District; 1st minor premiership
- Wooden spooners: Caulfield

The 1913 MAFA season was the 22nd season of the Metropolitan Amateur Football Association (MAFA). The season began on 27 April and concluded on 20 September, comprising an 18-match home-and-away season, followed by a three-week finals series.

Leopold won the MAFA premiership for the fifth time, defeating Collingwood District by 21 points in the 1913 MJFA Grand Final.

== Ladder ==
| Pos | Team | Pld | W | L | D | Pts | Qualification |
|---|---|---|---|---|---|---|---|
| 1 | Collingwood District | 18 | 17 | 1 | 0 | 68 | Finals series |
| 2 | Leopold (P) | 18 | 14 | 3 | 1 | 58 | Finals series |
| 3 | South Yarra | 18 | 12 | 6 | 0 | 48 | Finals series |
| 4 | Beverley | 18 | 10 | 8 | 0 | 40 | Finals series |
| 5 | Fitzroy Juniors | 18 | 9 | 9 | 0 | 36 | |
| 6 | University 2nd | 18 | 8 | 10 | 0 | 32 | |
| 7 | Carlton District | 18 | 7 | 11 | 0 | 28 | |
| 8 | Collegians | 18 | 4 | 13 | 1 | 18 | |
| 9 | Hawthorn | 18 | 4 | 14 | 0 | 16 | |
| 10 | Caulfield | 18 | 4 | 14 | 0 | 16 | |

(P) Premiers; (W) Club withdrew

== Finals ==
At the time, the MAFA used the Argus finals system, which gave the club that finished first on the ladder at the end of the home-and-away season (the minor premiers) the right to challenge the winner of the finals series for the premiership.

=== Semi-finals ===
| | Semi-finals |
| Saturday, 6 September (1:00pm) | Collingwood District 7.19 (61) | def. | Beverley 5.9 (39) | Melbourne Cricket Ground |
| Saturday, 6 September (3:00pm) | Leopold 13.14 (92) | def. | South Yarra 5.8 (38) | Richmond Cricket Ground |

=== Preliminary final ===
| | Preliminary final |
| Saturday, 13 September (1:00pm) | Collingwood District 6.7 (43) | def. by | Leopold 10.6 (66) | Melbourne Cricket Ground |

=== Grand Final ===
1913 MAFA Grand Final
Saturday, 20 September (1:00pm) | Collingwood District | def. by | Leopold | Melbourne Cricket Ground
0.5 (5) 3.11 (29) | Q1; Q2; Q3; Final | 3.10 (28) 6.14 (50) | Umpires: Herbert Coombes
Fitzgerald, Keary, Brown | Goals | Harley 2, Robertson 2, Woothen 2
A team of Adelaide schoolboys played a representative game against Melbourne state school students prior to the grand final.; The grand final was held as a curtain raiser to the Victorian Football League (VFL) semi-final between St Kilda and Fitzroy.
