= 1901 MJFA season =

10th season of the Metropolitan Junior Football Association

- Teams: 8
- Premiers: Leopold; 2nd premiership
- Minor premiers: Leopold; 2nd minor premiership

The 1901 MJFA season, also known as the 1901 MFA season, was the 10th season of the Metropolitan Junior Football Association (MJFA). (Note: In 1900, the Metropolitan Junior Football Association (MJFA, now VAFA) decided on a change of name to the Metropolitan Football Association (MFA). MJFA president Lawrence Adamson brokered a deal that the existing MFA (of 1899) became the MJFA, giving his MJFA (of 1892) the "Metropolitan Football Association" name. Despite this, various newspaper reports from 1900 until 1912 still use the MJFA name when referring to Adamson's competition, most consensus is that "MJFA" in this time period refers to the now-VAFA, and the VAFA's official history continues to use the MJFA name until 1912.)

Leopold won the MJFA premiership for the second year in a row, finishing first on the ladder after going undefeated for the entire season.

== Association membership ==
Prior to the start of the 1901 season, the Kew Football Club left the MJFA and joined another competition, also known as the MJFA. The South Melbourne Juniors also left, joining the Victorian Junior Football Association (VJFA).

The South Yarra Juniors Football Club, which had been formed in 1899, entered the MJFA. A previous South Yarra Football Club had joined the competition in 1897 but withdrew during the 1898 season.

== Ladder ==
Pos	Team	Pld	W	L	D	PF	PA	Pts
1	Leopold (P)	14	14	0	0	1035	286	56
2	Collegians	14	12	2	0	928	284	48
3	Caulfield	14	10	4	0	664	389	40
4	Brighton	14	7	7	0	547	721	28
5	Celtic	14	6	8	0	401	492	24
6	Beverley	14	3	11	0	389	607	12
7	South Yarra	14	3	11	0	346	841	12
8	St Ignatius	14	1	13	0	233	933	4

(P) Premiers; (W) Club withdrew
