= Cazaly =

Cazaly is a surname. Notable people with the surname include:

- Ernest Cazaly (1886–1940), Australian rules footballer
- Roy Cazaly (1893–1963), Australian rules footballer

== See also ==
- Cazaly Stadium
- "Up There Cazaly", 1979 song by Mike Brady, written to promote Channel Seven's coverage of the Victorian Football League
