= 1907 MJFA season =

16th season of the Metropolitan Junior Football Association

- Teams: 10
- Premiers: University; 2nd premiership
- Minor premiers: University; 2nd minor premiership
- Wooden spooners: Collingwood District; 1st wooden spoon

The 1907 MJFA season, also known as the 1907 MFA season, was the 16th season of the Metropolitan Junior Football Association (MJFA). (Note: In 1900, the Metropolitan Junior Football Association (MJFA, now VAFA) decided on a change of name to the Metropolitan Football Association (MFA). MJFA president Lawrence Adamson brokered a deal that the existing MFA (of 1899) became the MJFA, giving his MJFA (of 1892) the "Metropolitan Football Association" name. Despite this, various newspaper reports from 1900 until 1912 still use the MJFA name when referring to Adamson's competition, most consensus is that "MJFA" in this time period refers to the now-VAFA, and the VAFA's official history continues to use the MJFA name until 1912.)

University won the MJFA premiership for the second year in a row, finishing first on the ladder with only one loss for the entire season.

== Ladder ==
Pos	Team	Pld	W	L	D	Pts
1	University (P)	18	17	1	0	68
2	Brighton	18	16	2	0	64
3	Hawthorn	18	10	6	2	44
4	Collegians	18	11	7	0	44
5	Leopold	18	9	9	0	36
6	Port Rovers	18	7	10	1	30
7	South Yarra	18	6	12	0	24
8	Beverley	18	5	13	0	20
9	Caulfield	18	4	14	0	16
10	Collingwood District	18	3	14	1	14

(P) Premiers; (W) Club withdrew
