= Alexander Holland =

Alexander or Alex Holland may refer to:

- Skinnyman (Alexander Graham Holland), English rapper
- Alex Holland (footballer), Australian rules footballer
- Alexander de Holand, MP for Derby (UK Parliament constituency)
- Alexander Holland (MP) for Derby (UK Parliament constituency)

== See also ==
- Alec Holland, fictional character in the DC Comics universe
