= Bob Merrick (footballer, born 1917) =

Australian rules footballer

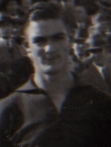

Personal information
- Full name: Robert Merrick
- Born: 24 November 1917; Warragul, Victoria
- Died: 25 May 1991 (aged 73)
- Original team: Pascoe Vale
- Height: 182 cm (6 ft 0 in)
- Weight: 76 kg (168 lb)
- Position: Forward

Playing career^{1}
Years	Club	Games (Goals)
1940, 1944	Fitzroy	6 (2)
- ^{1} Playing statistics correct to the end of 1944.

Robert Merrick (24 November 1917 – 25 May 1991) was an Australian rules footballer who played with Fitzroy in the Victorian Football League (VFL).

He was no relation to the better-known Fitzroy player of the same name who played for the club between 1919 and 1926.

== Early career ==
Merrick, who was born in Warragul, played junior football with Don Rovers in the Eastern District Football League, followed by Pascoe Vale. While at Pascoe Vale he was recruited by Richmond scouts and put on their supplementary list for the 1938 VFL season. Residentially tied to Essendon, the club wanted him to play for them so were unwilling to grant him a clearance to go to Richmond. Instead he returned to Pascoe Vale, but later in 1938 made five appearances for the Carlton seconds. In 1939, back at Pascoe Vale, Merrick won the best and fairest award in the VFL Sub-Districts with a record tally of votes.

== Fitzroy recruit ==
Merrick starred at centre half-forward for the Sub-District league in the annual combined match against Maryborough in 1939, which caught the attention of Fitzroy club secretary Percy Mitchell. Successful in obtaining a clearance from Carlton, Merrick performed well in practice matches for Fitzroy and was brought into the senior team for the opening round of the 1940 VFL season.

On debut, against St Kilda at Brunswick Street Oval, Merrick played on a half forward flank in an 11-point win. He did not register a goal but hit the top of the post with one shot. The following weekend, in round two, he was in the team that lost to North Melbourne at Arden Street Oval by 55-points. He again started on a flank, but struggled against the pace of Ossy Parks. At the beginning of the second quarter he was moved to centre half-forward, switching places with Alf Clay. Described as having a safe mark, Merrick was said to be more suited to this position.

== Military service ==
Merrick's career came to a stop after only two games on 31 May 1940 when he enlisted in the armed service. During the war he was reported to have been wounded three times, twice in the Middle East and later in Lae. He had just recovered from malaria when he returned to Fitzroy in the 1944 VFL season.

== Return to Fitzroy ==
Merrick was again used a forward in his second stint at Fitzroy, starting in a forward pocket for the first two rounds of the season, against St Kilda and Collingwood. He was 19th man in Fitzroy's round three win over North Melbourne and came on in the last quarter to replace and injured Clen Denning. In round four, against Richmond, Merrick played as a centre half-forward, later going to the back pocket to play on Jack Dyer.

=== Retirement ===
Merrick's war injuries, which left him with shrapnel in his lungs, forced him to retire on the advice of doctors.
