= Alf Gough =

Alf Gough may refer to:

- Alf Gough (footballer, born 1884) (1884–1952), Australian rules footballer for Carlton and Geelong
- Alf Gough (footballer, born 1888) (1888–1930), Australian rules footballer for South Melbourne
