= George Cathie (footballer, born 1876) =

Australian rules footballer

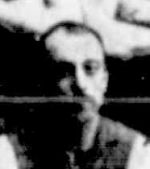

Personal information
- Full name: George James Cathie
- Born: 2 May 1876; Melbourne, Victoria
- Died: 6 September 1958 (aged 82); Hawthorn, Victoria
- Original team: Leopold (VJFA)
- Position: Rover/Forward/Wing

Playing career^{1}
Years	Club	Games (Goals)
1901–02	Melbourne	15 (14)
- ^{1} Playing statistics correct to the end of 1902.

George James Cathie (2 May 1876 – 6 September 1958) was an Australian rules footballer who played with Melbourne in the Victorian Football League (VFL).
