= Percy Abercrombie =

Australian rules footballer

Personal information
- Full name: Percy John Abercrombie
- Born: 1 January 1884; Yarram, Victoria
- Died: 22 May 1964 (aged 80); Heidelberg, Victoria
- Original team: Hawthorn (MJFA)
- Height: 171 cm (5 ft 7 in)
- Weight: 67 kg (148 lb)
- Position: Rover

Playing career^{1}
Years	Club	Games (Goals)
1902–04	Hawthorn (MJFA)	30 (14)
1903	Essendon	2 (0)
1905	South Melbourne	12 (0)
1906–08	South Fremantle	
1908	Railways (Goldfields)	
1909	Brighton (VFA)	3 (0)
- ^{1} Playing statistics correct to the end of 1909.

Percy John Abercrombie MC (1 January 1884 – 22 May 1964) was an Australian rules footballer of the 1900s who played with Essendon and South Melbourne in the Victorian Football League (VFL).

== Early life ==
Percy Abercrombie was born on New Year's Day in 1884, the second son of teacher Ralph Abercrombie and Mary Pearsall Lear. He was educated at Kew State School and Camberwell Grammar School.

== Football career ==
Abercrombie was a member of Hawthorn's first ever team in 1902 in the Metropolitan Junior Football Association (MJFA) and established himself as a leading player, being selected as part of a MJFA representative team. Abercrombie was then promoted to senior ranks, making two appearances for Essendon in the 1903 VFL season. He was reported as promising “to become a fine footballer” and “greatly pleasing the critics”, however failed to secure a regular place in the Essendon team.

He continued at Hawthorn, playing 30 games for them, and then in 1905 returned to the VFL competition with South Melbourne and made 12 appearances for them that year.

In 1906 he moved to Western Australia and he became a leading player at South Fremantle. In June 1908 Abercrombie abruptly left for Kalgoorlie, securing a permit and playing out the remainder of the season for the Railways club in the Goldfields League.

In 1909 Abercrombie returned to Melbourne, obtaining a permit to play with Carlton but after failing to secure a place in their team instead playing for Brighton in the Victorian Football Association. He only managed three appearances for Brighton before his senior career ended.

== Marriage ==
On 6 January 1912 Percy Abercrombie married Elizabeth Adelaide Glenn at her parents' residence in Albert Park.

== World War I ==
Abercrombie enlisted to serve in World War I in January 1916 and after completing 11 months of training at Royal Park embarked for France on the SS Victoria. In April 1918, Abercrombie received the Military Cross for "conspicuous gallantry and devotion to duty".

During an attack when our advance was held up by the fire of a hostile machinegun, this officer rushed forward with a bomb, with which he killed the gunner and put the gun out of action. Rallying the men, who had been checked, he charged forward with fearless energy, and captured, after a hand-to-hand fight, the objective in his front, securing fifteen prisoners. Throughout the operation, his coolness under heavy fire and his disregard for danger set a very fine example to his men.

— London Gazette, 16 September 1918

For this “conspicuous gallantry and devotion to duty” he was awarded the Military Cross in June 1918. He was also Mentioned in Despatches and gained promotion to Lieutenant during his service in France. He returned to Australia in December 1919.

== World War II ==
Abercrombie again volunteered to serve his country in World War II at the age of 56 (mis-representing his birth date in order to be eligible to serve). He joined the 6th Training Battalion and served for 9 months, being discharged in March 1941.

Percy Abercrombie died in Heidelberg at the age of 80 in May 1964.
