= Tommy Hughes (Australian footballer) =

Australian rules footballer

Personal information
- Full name: Thomas Edward Hughes
- Born: 25 December 1886; At sea near Launceston, Tasmania
- Died: 19 August 1981 (aged 94); Northcote, Victoria
- Original team: Leopold (MJFA)
- Position: Wing / Backline

Playing career^{1}
Years	Club	Games (Goals)
1911	Carlton	6 (1)
- ^{1} Playing statistics correct to the end of 1911.

Thomas Edward Hughes (25 December 1886 – 19 August 1981) was an Australian rules footballer who played with Carlton in the Victorian Football League (VFL), usually playing on the wing or in defence.

== Military service ==
He enlisted in the First AIF on 27 November 1915.

Some mistaken sources, confusing Hughes with one of two other AIF men of the same name who were killed in action, claim that he had been killed in the Somme during World War I; when, in fact, he returned to Australia on 23 June 1919.

Other mistaken sources based their statements on the obituary of "Private Tom Hughes" that appeared in The Winner of 6 June 1917, without having seen the retraction notice published a week later, that clearly stated that the deceased "Private Tom Hughes" was not one and the same as the "Gunner Tom Hughes" who once played for Carlton.

== Death ==
He died on 19 August 1981.
