= Frank Nolan (footballer) =

Australian rules footballer

Personal information
- Full name: Frank Nolan
- Born: 10 June 1915; St Kilda, Victoria
- Died: 31 May 1989 (aged 73)
- Original team: Caulfield
- Height: 177 cm (5 ft 10 in)
- Weight: 73 kg (161 lb)

Playing career^{1}
Years	Club	Games (Goals)
1934	Hawthorn	2 (2)
1937–40	Oakleigh (VFA)	51 (169)
- ^{1} Playing statistics correct to the end of 1934.

Frank Nolan (10 June 1915 – 31 May 1989) was an Australian rules footballer who played with Hawthorn in the Victorian Football League (VFL).

== Family ==
The son of Hugh Nolan (1884–1965), and Elizabeth Mary Nolan (1887–1961), née Brown, Frank Nolan was born at St Kilda, Victoria on 10 June 1915.

He married Edna Mary Clifton (1916–1993) in 1940.

== Football ==
=== Caulfield (FDL) ===
Nolan kicked 116 goals for the Caulfield Football Club in the Federal District League in 1933.

=== Hawthorn (VFL) ===
Cleared from Caulfield in May 1934, Nolan played two games for the Hawthorn First XVIII in the early part of the 1934 VFL season, scoring a goal in each of his games against Collingwood and Essendon but mostly played for the Second XVIII in his time at Hawthorn in 1934.

=== Caulfield (FDL) ===
He returned to Caulfield in 1935.

=== Oakleigh (VFA) ===
In 1937 he trialled with both Oakleigh and Hawthorn. He was cleared from Hawthorn to Oakleigh in April 1937, and became a key goal scorer for them over the next four seasons.

== Military service ==
Nolan later served in the Australian Army in Papua New Guinea during World War II.
