= Harry Baker (Australian footballer) =

Australian rules footballer

Personal information
- Full name: Henry Finlayson Baker
- Born: 30 November 1907; Camperdown, Victoria
- Died: 1 November 1992 (aged 84); Mildura, Victoria
- Original team: Kingsville Amateurs
- Height: 183 cm (6 ft 0 in)
- Weight: 80 kg (176 lb)
- Position: Halfback

Playing career^{1}
Years	Club	Games (Goals)
1926–1934	Footscray	111 (19)
- ^{1} Playing statistics correct to the end of 1934.

Career highlights
- Clota Medal: 1936

Henry Finlayson Baker (30 November 1907 – 1 November 1992) was an Australian rules footballer who played with Footscray in the Victorian Football League (VFL) between 1926 and 1934. He later won the Clota Medal, the best and fairest award in the VFL Sub-Districts competition, while playing for Prahran City in 1936.
