= Harry Boully =

Australian rules footballer

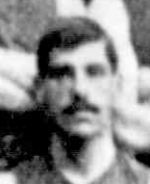

Personal information
- Full name: Harry Boully
- Born: 28 December 1879; Sandhurst, Victoria
- Died: 16 May 1970 (aged 90); Norwood, South Australia
- Original team: Leopold

Playing career^{1}
Years	Club	Games (Goals)
1901–02	Melbourne	8 (3)
- ^{1} Playing statistics correct to the end of 1902.

Harry Boully (28 December 1879 – 16 May 1970) was an Australian rules footballer who played with Melbourne in the Victorian Football League (VFL).
