= Ron J. Evans =

Australian rules footballer

Ron Evans

Personal information
- Full name: Ronald Joseph Evans
- Born: 20 February 1926
- Died: 29 December 2004 (aged 78)
- Original team: Richmond United
- Height: 175 cm (5 ft 9 in)
- Weight: 67 kg (148 lb)

Playing career^{1}
Years	Club	Games (Goals)
1946–49	Richmond	26 (36)
1950	Hawthorn	13 (11)
Total		39 (47)
- ^{1} Playing statistics correct to the end of 1950.

Ronald Joseph Evans (20 February 1926 – 29 December 2004) was an Australian rules footballer who played with Richmond and Hawthorn in the Victorian Football League (VFL). Prior to his VFL debut in 1946, Evans won the best and fairest award in the VFL Sub-Districts while playing for Richmond United in 1945.
