= Harry Bruce (Australian footballer) =

Australian rules footballer

Personal information
- Full name: William Henry Bruce
- Born: 12 July 1895; Murrumbeena, Victoria
- Died: 7 December 1977 (aged 82); Malvern East, Victoria
- Original team: Melbourne Juniors

Playing career^{1}
Years	Club	Games (Goals)
1921	Melbourne	7 (1)
- ^{1} Playing statistics correct to the end of 1921.

William Henry Bruce MM (12 July 1895 – 7 December 1977) was an Australian rules footballer who played with Melbourne in the Victorian Football League (VFL).

After leaving the VFL, Bruce captained the Caulfield Football Club in the Federal District Football League (FDFL) for the 1933 season.

Prior to playing VFL football, Bruce served in World War I, being awarded the Military Medal in 1918 "for gallantry in the field when he established a communications station under fire".
