= Bill Hennington =

Australian rules footballer

Personal information
- Full name: William Hennington
- Born: c. 1891
- Died: 11 July 1964; Kew, Victoria
- Original team: Leopold (MJFA)
- Height: 178 cm (5 ft 10 in)
- Weight: 74 kg (163 lb)

Playing career^{1}
Years	Club	Games (Goals)
1914	South Melbourne	6 (0)
- ^{1} Playing statistics correct to the end of 1914.

William Hennington (c. 1891 – 11 July 1964) was an Australian rules footballer who played with South Melbourne in the Victorian Football League (VFL).

== Family ==
The son of George Hennington (1865–1907), and Isabella Sophia Hennington (1861–1907), née Remington, William Hennington was born at South Melbourne c.1891.

He married Annie Elizabeth Jane Gardener (c.1892-1960) in 1922.

== Football ==
In May 1915 he was granted a clearance from South Melbourne to Leopold.
