= St James Park, Hawthorn =

Sporting venue in Hawthorn, Victoria

St James Park
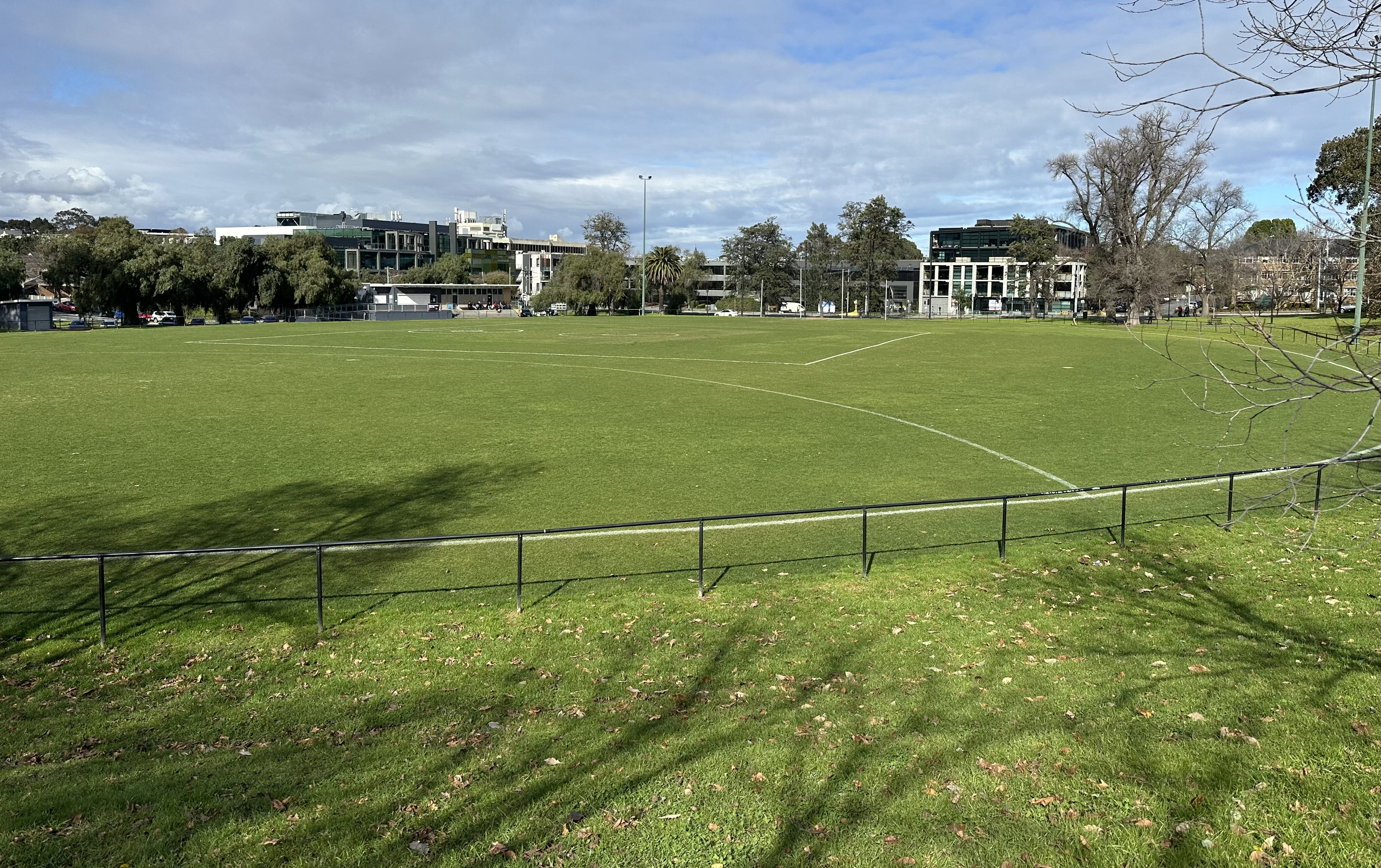
- St James Park in July 2026
- Interactive map of St James Park
- Location: Hawthorn, Victoria
- Coordinates: 37.81993°S 145.02128°E
- Operator: City of Boroondara
- Public transit: ■ St James Park ● ● ● Hawthorn

Construction
- Opened: February 1861; 165 years ago

Tenant
- Swinburne University Football Club (VAFA)

St James Park (formerly known as West Hawthorn Reserve) is an Australian rules football and cricket venue located in the Melbourne suburb of Hawthorn. The name also refers to the wider public park in which the main oval is located.

The ground was opened in 1861 and was originally known as the Hawthorn Cricket Ground. It was the home ground of the Hawthorn Football Club for its inaugural season in 1902.

As of 2026, St James Park is the home of the Swinburne University Football Club in the Victorian Amateur Football Association (VAFA). The club nicknames the ground "The Pig Pen" or "The Porktress".

== History ==
In 1858, the Road Board (under the Boroondara Road District) sought to secure certain grounds opposite the residence of James Frederick Palmer, the president of the Victorian Legislative Council. The land was originally reserved by the Crown and known as West Hawthorn Reserve or Hawthorn Recreation Reserve. It was gazetted as a public reserve in February 1861. Cricket was first played at the ground in the 1870s, while football was recorded for the first time in 1881.

By 1900, the Hawthorn Cricket Ground was fenced and had six entry gates. Victorian Junior Football Association (VJFA) club West Richmond used the ground during the 1900 season.

In April 1902, the Hawthorn Football Club was formed and entered the Metropolitan Junior Football Association (MJFA), playing its home matches at the Hawthorn Cricket Ground. After one season, Hawthorn moved to Richmond Racecourse because of conditions imposed by the Hawthorn Cricket Club.

Both the Diggers Football Club and the West Hawthorn Presbyterian Football Club were given permission to use the ground during the 1924 season.

The Hawthorn War Memorial was opened at St James Park in 1929.

The "St James Park" name originated from Palmer's estate, but it was also used by the St James Park Football Club, which played at the ground in 1887. It was not used as an official name until the 1970s.

On 1 September 1982, St James Park was placed on a non-statutory local government heritage list; and the Victorian branch of the National Trust also added to a non-statutory list on an unknown date.

St James Park has been utilised by Hawthorn West Primary School (formerly known as Hawthorn West State School) for sporting activities as early as the 1920s.

== Transport access ==
St James Park is primarily serviced by tram route 75, which stops directly outside the Burwood Road end of the ground. The Hawthorn railway station is a short walking distance from the ground.
