= 1905 MJFA season =

14th season of the Metropolitan Junior Football Association

- Date: 6 May – 2 September 1902
- Teams: 10
- Premiers: Port Rovers; 1st premiership
- Minor premiers: Port Rovers; 2nd minor premiership
- Wooden spooners: Beverley; 2nd wooden spoon

The 1905 MJFA season, also known as the 1905 MFA season, was the 14th season of the Metropolitan Junior Football Association (MJFA). (Note: In 1900, the Metropolitan Junior Football Association (MJFA, now VAFA) decided on a change of name to the Metropolitan Football Association (MFA). MJFA president Lawrence Adamson brokered a deal that the existing MFA (of 1899) became the MJFA, giving his MJFA (of 1892) the "Metropolitan Football Association" name. Despite this, various newspaper reports from 1900 until 1912 still use the MJFA name when referring to Adamson's competition, most consensus is that "MJFA" in this time period refers to the now-VAFA, and the VAFA's official history continues to use the MJFA name until 1912.)

Port Rovers won the MJFA premiership for the first time, finishing first on the ladder with 15 wins from its 18 games.

== Association membership ==
Like the previous season in 1904, a total of ten teams competed in the MJFA. On 30 March 1905, prior to the start of the season, Boroondara merged with Hawthorn. Hawthorn retained its own name, but adopted Boroondara's colours of a black guernsey with a red sash.

The University Football Club, which had fielded a reserves team in the MJFA during the 1893 season, returned to the competition with a senior team.

== Ladder ==
Pos	Team	Pld	W	L	D	Pts
1	Port Rovers (P)	18	15	3	0	60
2	Collegians	18	13	4	1	54
3	Leopold	18	11	6	1	46
4	University	18	11	7	0	44
5	Brighton	18	10	7	1	42
6	Collegians	18	9	8	1	38
7	Caulfield	18	9	9	0	36
8	Hawthorn	18	5	13	0	20
9	Fitzroy District	18	4	14	0	16
10	Beverley	18	1	17	0	4

(P) Premiers; (W) Club withdrew
