= Bobby Craig (Australian footballer) =

Australian rules footballer

Personal information
- Full name: Robert Ritchie Craig
- Born: 29 March 1882
- Original team: Leopold
- Height: 179 cm (5 ft 10 in)
- Positions: Defender, ruckman

Playing career^{1}
Years	Club	Games (Goals)
1902	Melbourne	3 (0)
- ^{1} Playing statistics correct to the end of 1902.

Robert Ritchie Craig (born 29 March 1882, date of death unknown) was an Australian rules footballer who played with Melbourne in the Victorian Football League (VFL).
