= Wal Smallhorn =

Australian rules footballer

Personal information
- Full name: Walter Leslie Smallhorn
- Born: 5 July 1881; Hobart, Tasmania
- Died: 23 November 1968 (aged 87); Malvern East, Victoria
- Original team: Leopold / Lefroy
- Height: 175 cm (5 ft 9 in)
- Weight: 73 kg (161 lb)

Playing career^{1}
Years	Club	Games (Goals)
1905–06	South Melbourne	4 (0)
- ^{1} Playing statistics correct to the end of 1906.

Walter Leslie Smallhorn (5 July 1881 – 23 November 1968) was an Australian rules footballer who played with South Melbourne in the Victorian Football League (VFL).
