= Syd Anderson (footballer, born 1884) =

Australian rules footballer

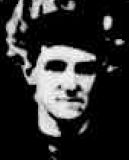

Personal information
- Full name: Sydney Beckwith Anderson
- Born: 12 March 1884; North Melbourne, Victoria
- Died: 1 August 1954 (aged 70); Surrey Hills, Victoria
- Original team: Leopold
- Height: 182 cm (6 ft 0 in)
- Weight: 79 kg (174 lb)

Playing career^{1}
Years	Club	Games (Goals)
1902–07	Melbourne	53 (10)
- ^{1} Playing statistics correct to the end of 1907.

Sydney Beckwith "Syd" Anderson (12 March 1884 – 1 August 1954) was an Australian rules footballer who played with Melbourne in the Victorian Football League (VFL).
