= Alf Boyce =

Australian rules footballer

Personal information
- Full name: Alfred George Boyce
- Born: 3 March 1895; Clifton Hill, Victoria
- Died: 3 June 1977 (aged 82); Fairfield, Victoria
- Original team: Fitzroy Juniors
- Height: 178 cm (5 ft 10 in)
- Weight: 70 kg (154 lb)

Playing career^{1}
Years	Club	Games (Goals)
1915, 1917–1918	South Melbourne	18 (22)
1920	Fitzroy	4 (10)
Total		22 (32)
- ^{1} Playing statistics correct to the end of 1920.

Alfred George Boyce (3 March 1895 – 3 June 1977) was an Australian rules footballer who played for the South Melbourne Football Club and Fitzroy Football Club in the Victorian Football League (VFL).
