= Percy Blencowe =

Australian rules footballer

Personal information
- Full name: Percival Stewart Blencowe
- Born: 27 January 1887; Fitzroy, Victoria
- Died: 10 January 1951 (aged 63); South Melbourne, Victoria
- Original team: Leopold

Playing career^{1}
Years	Club	Games (Goals)
1905–06	South Melbourne	7 (0)
- ^{1} Playing statistics correct to the end of 1906.

Percival Stewart Blencowe (27 January 1887 – 10 January 1951) was an Australian rules footballer who played with South Melbourne in the Victorian Football League (VFL).

== Family ==
The son of John Robert Blencowe (1852–1921), and Louisa Blencowe (1853–1918), née Galagher, Percival Stewart Blencowe was born at Fitzroy, Victoria on 27 January 1887.

== Death ==
He died (suddenly) on 10 January 1951.
