= Len Hogg =

Australian rules footballer

Personal information
- Full name: Len Hogg
- Born: 26 December 1905
- Died: 21 September 1976 (aged 70)

Playing career^{1}
Years	Club	Games (Goals)
1928–1929	South Melbourne	16 (30)
- ^{1} Playing statistics correct to the end of 1929.

Len Hogg (26 December 1905 – 21 September 1976) was an Australian rules footballer who played with South Melbourne in the Victorian Football League (VFL).
