= VFL Sub-Districts =

Australian rules football competition, 1925–1949

- Sport: Australian rules football
- Founded: 1925; 101 years ago
- Folded: 1949; 77 years ago
- Country: Australia
- Most titles: Kew (5 Division 1 premierships)
- Related competitions: VFL; VFL reserves

The VFL Sub-Districts (VFLSD), sometimes referred to as the Victorian Sub-District Football League (VSDFL), was an Australian rules football competition played in the state of Victoria and managed by the Victorian Football League (VFL), now known as the Australian Football League (AFL). The competition was preceded by the Melbourne District Football Association (MDFA) and succeeded by the Metropolitan Football League (MFL).

The Sub-Districts included a number of "thirds" teams for senior VFL clubs, prior to the introduction of the VFL thirds (later VFL/AFL under-19s) in 1946. A similar competition, the VFA Sub-Districts, also existed at the time of the VFLSD and was managed by the Victorian Football Association (VFA).

== History ==
=== MDFA ===
The Melbourne District Football Association (MDFA) was formed in the 1900s.

The MDFA appears to stopped play during World War I, although a different competition (known as the Melbourne Junior Football Association) was formed in April 1918. It is possible that MDFA clubs including Coburg and Moreland joined this competition for the 1918 season.

=== VFLSD ===
At the end of the 1924 season, the VFL took over the MDFA and replaced it with the VFL Sub-Districts, officially called the Victorian Football League Sub-Districts Association. W.H. Smith was elected as the new league's inaugural president, and the first game was played on 2 May 1925 between Oakleigh and Dandenong. Public Service won the inaugural premiership in 1925, with a total of ten clubs competing in the competition the following year in 1926.

The competition was split into two in 1927. In 1927, there was a further split with the introduction of "First Grade North" (Division 1 North), "First Grade South" (Division 1 South), the "unallocated Second Grade" (Division 2) and the similarly named "Seconds Grade" (the latter being a reserves competition, largely for the "Second Grade"). The winner of the North and South sections would go on to play in a grand final for the overall VFLSD premiership, while the winners of Division 2 and the Seconds (Reserves) Grade also played each other. In 1929, Division 2 was also split into North and South sections.

Fairfield and Kew drew in the 1929 grand final, with the replay won by Kew. The clubs again drew in the 1935 grand final, with that replay won by Fairfield in a game that resulted in four players being suspended for fighting.

Like in the senior VFL competition, the Page–McIntyre system was introduced in 1933, replacing the Argus finals system. However, it appears the Argus system (or a similar system) returned in 1944, as The Age noted grand finalist East Brunswick "[had] the right of an extra game" after losing a final to Richmond District the week before.

=== MFL ===
In 1950, the VFL Sub-Districts was succeeded by the Metropolitan Football League (MFL).

Following the conclusion of the 1958 VFA season, the Prahran Football Club was expelled from the VFA for failing to meet the minimum home ground requirements, and was replaced by the Sunshine Football Club, which had been runners-up in the MFL in 1958. Prahran subsequently spent 1959 competing in the MFL's A Grade, winning the premiership with just a single loss for the season, and the club returned to the VFA in 1960.

== Clubs ==
Dozens of clubs competed in the MDFA, VFL Sub-Districts and MFL.

Club	Colours	Nickname	Former league	Est.	Seasons	Premierships		Fate	Ref.
Club	Colours	Nickname	Former league	Est.	Seasons	Total	Final	Fate	Ref.
Balwyn		Tigers	RDFA	1909	1927−1931	1	1927	EFNL	
Camberwell		Cobras	VJFA	1880s	1920−1925	0	−	Folded; 1995	
Canterbury		Tricolours	RDFA	1881	1925−1931	0	−	VAFA	
Carnegie			VJFA	1920s	1928−1931	0	−	Folded; 2000	
Caulfield		Fieldsmen	MAFA	1890s	1925−1931	0	−	Folded; 1976	
Coburg		Lions	VJFA	1891	1913−1920	3	1920	VFL	
Darling					1928−1933	0	−	Folded; 1940	
Elsternwick		Wickers			1911−1912			VAFA	
Eltham		Panthers	DVFL	1909	1936−1937	0	−	NFNL	
Fitzroy Stars		Stars	−	1973	1973−1974	1	1974	NFNL	
Heidelberg		Tigers	DVFL	1876	1926−1929	0	−	NFNL	
Kew		Bears	VJFA	1876	1927−1949	5	1937	VAFA	
Oakleigh		Purple and Golds		1891	1928−1933	1	1928	Folded; 1994	
Prahran		Two Blues	VFA	1899	1959	1	1959	VAFA	
Public Service		Service		1915	1915−1933	1	1925	Folded; 1933s	
South Melbourne Districts		Bloods	VJFA	1912	1927−1973 (Note: The Argus wrote in April 1936 that South Melbourne Districts was in the VFA Sub-Districts, while The Age wrote in May 1936 that the club was instead in the VFL Sub-Districts. It is possible that the Districts had two teams, one in each competition, just as Balwyn had a team in both the VFL Sub-Districts and Reporter District Football Association during the 1927 season.)	0	−	VAFA	

== Premiers ==
Kew won the most known Division 1/A Grade VFLSD premierships, with a total of five.

GF	Premiership decided by a grand final where a challenge was not needed
GF (R)	Premiership decided by a grand final replay, after the scheduled grand final was drawn
CF	Premiership decided by a challenge final under the Argus system

=== MDFA premiers ===
Year	Premiers	Runners-up	Score	Venue	Date	Report
1912	Richmond District	Elsternwick	unknown	Preston City Oval	14 September 1912	
1913	Coburg (1)	Richmond District	4.13 (37) d. 2.13 (25)	Brunswick Park	13 September 1913	
1914	Coburg (2)	Melbourne District	7.10 (52) d. 4.5 (29)	Brunswick Park	12 September 1914	
1919	Brunswick Juniors	Hawthorn District	7.12 (55) d. 3.12 (30)	Richmond City Reserve	30 August 1919	
1920	Coburg (3)	Brunswick Juniors	6.12 (48) d. 4.15 (39)	Brunswick Park	25 September 1920	
1921	Camberwell	Brunswick Juniors	8.10 (58) d. 7.6 (48)	Oakleigh	24 September 1921	
1922	Camberwell	Moreland	9.12 (66) d. 8.8 (56)	Melbourne Cricket Ground	7 October 1922	
1923	Camberwell	Fairfield	9.12 (66) d. 8.8 (56)	Melbourne Cricket Ground	28 September 1923	
1924	Oakleigh	Camberwell	13.12 (90) d. 7.12 (54)	Oakleigh	27 September 1924	

=== VFL Sub-Districts premiers ===
Year	Premiers	Runners-up	Score	Venue	Date	Report
1925	Public Service (1)	Camberwell (1)	13.12 (90) d. 7.12 (54)	Oakleigh	3 October 1925	
1926	Fairfield (1)	Oakleigh (1)	9.7 (55) d. 7.9 (51)	Oakleigh	2 October 1926	
1927	Balwyn (1)	Middle Park (1)	9.12 (66) d. 6.12 (48)	Oakleigh	8 October 1927	
1928	Fairfield (2)	Oakleigh (2)	17.16 (118) d. 13.13 (91)	Oakleigh	22 September 1928	
1929	Kew	Fairfield	8.8 (56) drew 8.8 (56)	Ascot Vale	28 September 1929	
1929	Kew (1)	Fairfield (1)	10.16 (76) d. 5.14 (44)	Oakleigh	5 October 1929	
1930	South Melbourne Districts (1)	Sunshine (1)	11.7 (73) d. 10.12 (72)	Oakleigh	11 October 1930	
1931	Kew (2)	South Melbourne Districts (1)	11.15 (80) d. 7.16 (58)	Motordome	5 September 1931	
1932	Kew (3)	Auburn (1)	19.19 (133) d. 11.12 (78)	Motordome	17 September 1932	
1933	South Melbourne Districts (2)	Sunshine (2)	17.14 (116) d. 7.10 (52)	Brunswick	23 September 1933	
1934	Kew (4)	Sunshine (3)	4.15 (39) d. 2.6 (18)	Brunswick	29 September 1934	
1935	Fairfield	Kew	10.16 (76) drew 11.10 (76)	Northcote Park	14 September 1935	
1935	Fairfield (3)	Kew (1)	16.12 (112) d. 12.10 (82)	Selwyn Park	21 September 1935	
1936	Sunshine (1)	South Melbourne Districts (2)	15.13 (103) d. 8.7 (55)	Port Melbourne	12 September 1936	
1937	South Melbourne Districts (3)	Sunshine (4)	8.10 (58) d. 7.12 (54)	Melbourne Cricket Ground	18 September 1937	
1938	Fairfield (4)	East Brunswick (1)	12.14 (86) d. 11.15 (81)	Olympic Park	17 September 1938	
1939	South Melbourne Districts (4)	Kew (2)	14.15 (99) d. 9.13 (67)	Melbourne Cricket Ground	16 September 1939	
1940	South Melbourne Districts (5)	Sunshine Districts (5)	12.16 (88) d. 4.9 (33)	Sunshine	21 September 1940	
1941	West Melbourne (1)	South Melbourne Districts (3)	13.20 (98) d. 12.13 (85)	Fitzroy Cricket Ground	13 September 1941	
1942	Abbotsford (1)	Richmond District (1)	19.6 (120) d. 7.11 (53)	Victoria Park	5 September 1942	
1943	East Brunswick (1)	Fitzroy Thirds (1)	12.20 (92) to 4.7 (31) (Note: On 21 August 1943, Abbotsford played Fitzroy in a semi-final. It appears Fitzroy may have won, as on 28 August 1943, Fitzroy then played East Brunswick in a final. The Herald wrote on 20 September 1943 that "[Fitzroy's] Thirds were runners-up in Sub-District League". Despite an umpire being appointed for a "grand final" on 4 September Fitzroy being runners up is impossible and it can be stated that the actual premiership was decided in the final on 28 August)	Unknown	28 August 1943	
1944	Richmond District (1)	East Brunswick (2)	7.16 (58) d. 6.10 (46)	Fitzroy Cricket Ground	9 September 1944	
1945	Richmond United (1)	East Brunswick (3)	15.23 (113) d 12.19 (91)	unknown	15 September 1945	
1946	Richmond United (2)	East Brunswick (4)	9.14 (68) d. 9.11 (65)	Melbourne Cricket Ground	5 October 1946	
1947	Fairfield (5)	Richmond United (1)	13.8 (86) d. 12.1 (73)	unknown	unknown 1947	
1948	East Brunswick (2)	Richmond United (2)	13.7 (85) d. 10.12 (72)	Warringal Park	25 September 1948	
1949	Richmond United (3)	East Brunswick (5)	8.10 (58) d 5.11 (41)	unknown	unknown 1949	

=== Division 1 North premiers ===
Year	Premiers	Runners-up	Score	Venue	Date	Report
1928	Fairfield	Alphington	15.16 - 106 to 15.7 - 97	Northcote Park	8 September 1928	

=== Division 1 South premiers ===
Year	Premiers	Runners-up	Score	Venue	Date	Report
1928	Oakleigh	South Melbourne Districts	15.15 (105) d. 10.31 (91)	Northcote Park	15 September 1928	

=== Second Grade premiers ===
This premiership was contested by the winner of the unallocated "Second Grade" (Division 2) and the "Seconds Grade" (reserves competition), and later the winner of Division 2 North and Division 2 South.

Year	Premiers	Runners-up	Score	Venue	Date	Report
1928	Abbotsford	Kew Districts	8.9 (57) d. 6.8 (44)	Melbourne Cricket Ground	22 September 1928	
1929	Middle Park	Kew Districts	13.6 (84) d. 12.8 (80)	Oakleigh	5 October 1929	

=== Division 2 premiers ===
Year	Premiers	Runners-up	Score	Venue	Date	Report
1928	Abbotsford					
1931	North Fitzroy	Darling				
1932	Fairfield District	North Fitzroy	12.1 (73) d. 5.6 (36)	Motordome	24 September 1932	
1933	East Brunswick	Kew District	14.12 (96) d. 11.6 (72)	Melbourne Cricket Ground	7 October 1933	

=== Division 2 North premiers ===
Year	Premiers	Runners-up	Score	Venue	Date	Report
1929	Middle Park	North Fitzroy	13.12 (90) d. 9.12 (66)	Tooronga	28 September 1929	
1931	North Fitzroy	Fairfield District	5.8 (38) d. 4.13 (37)		19 September 1931	

=== Division 2 South premiers ===
Year	Premiers	Runners-up	Score	Venue	Date	Report
1929	Kew District	Tooronga	9.15 (69) d. 6.7 (49)	Tooronga	28 September 1929	
1931	Darling	Kew District	16.15 (111) d. 10.8 (68)	Motordome	26 September 1931	

=== Reserves premiers ===
Year	Premiers	Runners-up	Score	Venue	Date	Report
1925	Fairfield (1)					
1926	Fairfield (2)	Middle Park	13.9 (87) d. 8.8 (56)	Melbourne Cricket Ground	25 September 1926	
1928	Kew Districts					

=== MFL premiers ===
Year	Premier	G	B	Pts	Runner Up	G	B	Pts
1950	East Brunswick	8	13	61	South Melbourne District	6	12	48
1951	Sunshine	14	8	92	East Brunswick	8	7	55
1952	East Brunswick	14	15	99	Sunshine	6	11	47
1953	Fairfield	14	12	96	Hawthorn District	6	7	43
1954	Fairfield	6	12	48	Hawthorn City	5	13	43
1955	Richmond District	9	20	74	Sunshine	8	7	55
1956	Sunshine	11	10	76	Richmond Districts	5	12	42
1957	East Hawthorn	13	7	85	East Brunswick	8	8	56
1958	East Hawthorn	9	10	64	Sunshine	7	13	55
1959	Prahran City	4	14	38	East Hawthorn	4	6	30
1960	East Hawthorn	8	13	61	East Brunswick	4	20	44
1961	East Hawthorn	9	8	62	East Brunswick	6	14	50
1962	South Melbourne Districts	15	7	97	East Brunswick	9	12	66
1963	East Brunswick	12	9	81	East Hawthorn	8	11	59
1964	East Brunswick	11	10	76	East Hawthorn	9	14	68
1965	East Hawthorn	12	12	84	Northcote Park	7	7	49
1966	East Hawthorn	11	11	77	East Brunswick	6	9	45
1967	East Hawthorn	13	16	94	Reservoir	13	9	87
1968	East Hawthorn	9	14	68	Northcote Park	5	5	35
1969	East Hawthorn	12	13	85	Northcote Park	9	10	64
1970	Port Colts	21	9	135	Northcote Park	11	8	74
1971	Port Colts	15	10	100	East Brunswick	6	6	42
1972	Port Colts	16	16	112	Richmond District	11	17	83
1973	Port Colts	18	15	123	Broadmeadows	13	12	90
1974	East Hawthorn				Collingwood Districts			

== Best and fairest ==
The best and fairest award in the VFL Sub-Districts and the MFL was known as the Clota Medal (sometimes referred to as the Clota Trophy). The award was named Marcus Clota, a former vice-president of South Melbourne who served as the VFL Sub-Districts president until his death on 25 December 1940.

Year	Player	Club	Ref
1925	Jack Holford	Spring Vale	
1926	Don Fraser Sr.	Fairfield	
1927	Clarrie Answorth	Public Service	
1928	George Taylor	Oakleigh	
1929	H. Coombs	Auburn	
1930	E. Stockdale	Sunshine	
1931	S. McKenzie	Auburn	
1932	Hec Rutherford	Ivanhoe	
1933	Ian Lee	South Melbourne Districts	
1934	Les Harvey	Abbotsford	
1935	Not awarded − 13 players on equal votes		
1936	Harold Baker	Prahran City	
1937	A. Powell	Fairfield	
1938	R. Austin	Kew	
1939	Bob Merrick	Pascoe Vale	
1940	Vic James	Sunshine	
1941	N. Dorey	Richmond District	
1942	R. Austin	Richmond City	
1945	Ron J. Evans	Richmond United	
1946	Billy Walsh	Kew	
1947	Stan Wilson	Richmond District	
1948	L. Campbell	East Brunswick	
1949	J. Lloyd	East Brunswick	
1950	Bernie Miller	South Melbourne Districts	
1951	Peter MacAree	Newport	
1952	Percy Wills	Abbotsford	
1953	Les Hunter	Sunshine	
1954	A. Whittenbury	Reservoir	
1959	Daryl Jones	South Melbourne Districts	
1960	Daryl Jones	South Melbourne Districts	
1964	Eddie Lane	South Melbourne Districts	
1971	Daryl Degenhardt	Port Melbourne Colts	
1973	Daryl Degenhardt	Port Melbourne Colts	
