= Citizens Park, Richmond =

Sports venue in Richmond, Victoria

Citizens Park
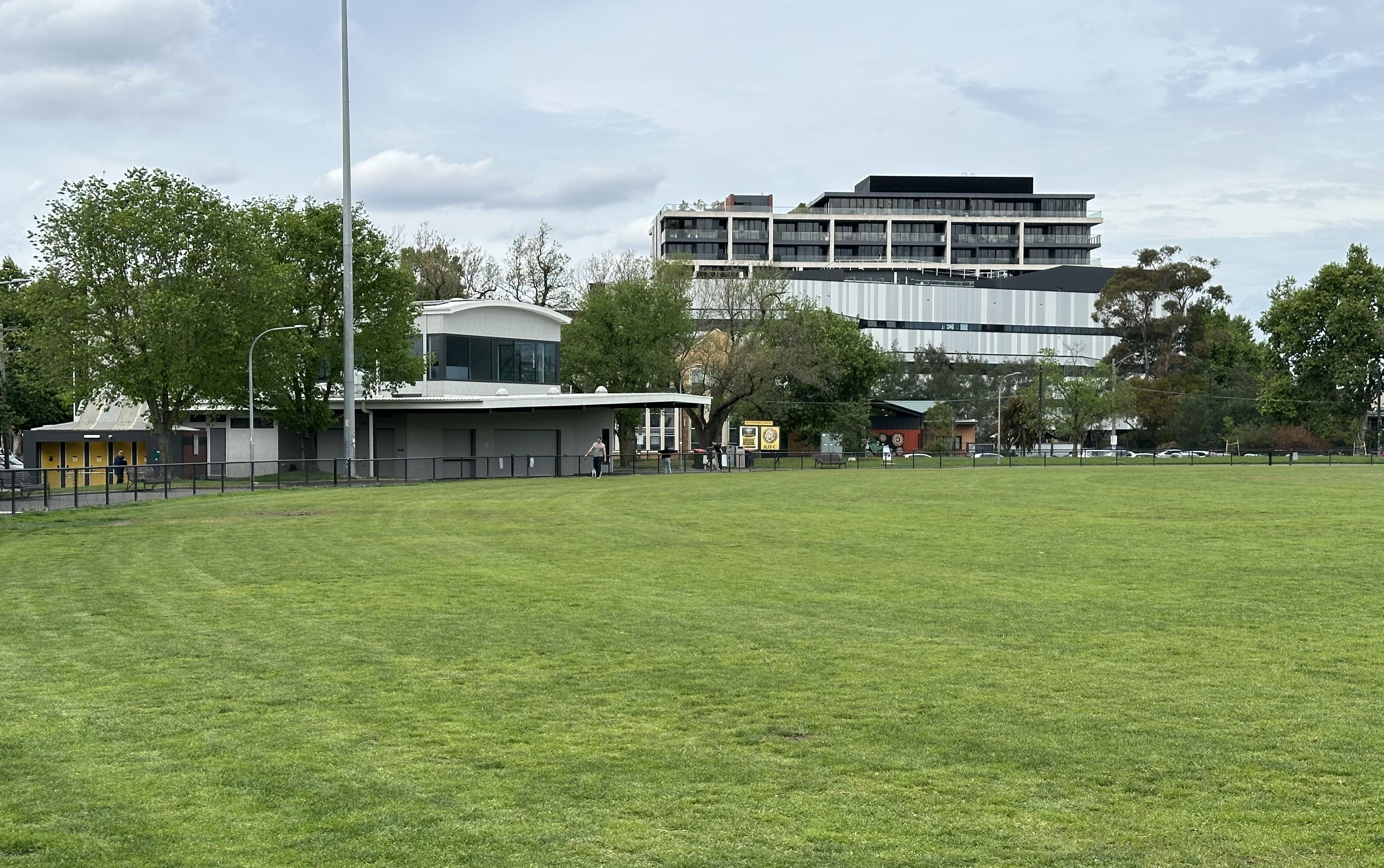
- Interactive map of Citizens Park
- Former names: Market Reserve; Richmond City Reserve
- Address: Gleadell St & Highett St; Richmond, Victoria
- Coordinates: 37.817°S 145.001°E
- Owner: City of Yarra
- Capacity: 500

Construction
- Opened: 1867; 159 years ago

Tenants
- Richmond Junior Football Club (YJFL); Richmond Union Cricket Club (ECA); Richmond Harriers Athletic Club

Citizens Park (formerly Market Reserve and Richmond City Reserve) is an Australian rules football and cricket venue in the Melbourne suburb of Richmond. The name also refers to the wider public park in which the main oval is located.

The ground hosted four Victorian Football Association (VFA) matches in the 1890s and was regularly used for junior competitions throughout the first half of the 20th century. (Note: At the time, the term "junior" was used to describe open age football of a lower standard than senior football, rather than under age football.) It is located behind the Richmond Town Hall and next to Richmond High School.

As of 2025, it is home to the Richmond Junior Football Club in the Yarra Junior Football League (YJFL), the Richmond Union Cricket Club in the Eastern Cricket Association (ECA), and the Richmond Harriers Athletic Club.

== History ==
Market Reserve was established around 1867 and opened as a public market (present-day Gleadell Street Market) in 1873. It was developed in 1893 and renamed to Richmond City Reserve. The Vaucluse Football Club changed its name to "Richmond City" in 1894, playing at the ground as a first-rate team in the Victorian Junior Football Association (VJFA).

In 1896, Richmond City Reserve hosted its first senior VFA match when Carlton's match against Richmond was moved from University Oval. The following season in 1897, Richmond played three of its home games at the ground (with the rest at Punt Road Oval).

Two Metropolitan Junior Football Association (MJFA) clubs – Beverley and St Ignatius – played home matches at Richmond City Reserve in 1902, with the 1904 MJFA Grand Final between Port Rovers and Collegians also hosted at the venue. Other grand finals played at the ground included the VJFA in 1909 and the Melbourne District Football Association (MDFA) in 1914.

By 1973, the ground had been renamed to Citizens Park and served as the home ground of the Richmond Junior Football Club, which played in the Hawthorn Districts Junior Football League (HDJFL) until entering the newly-formed Yarra Junior Football League (YJFL) in 1996.

The Jack Dyer Pavilion, named after Richmond footballer Jack Dyer, was opened by Richmond mayor Ern Boland on 31 July 1943. The pavilion was redeveloped at a cost of approximately A$3 million and reopened on 28 May 2022. In addition to upgraded clubrooms, the pavilion also features a community room available for public hire.
