= Bert Russell (footballer) =

Australian rules footballer

Personal information
- Full name: Herbert Ernest Russell
- Born: 7 June 1899; Port Melbourne, Victoria
- Died: 9 April 1983 (aged 83); Elsternwick, Victoria
- Original team: Leopold
- Height: 160 cm (5 ft 3 in)
- Weight: 61 kg (134 lb)

Playing career^{1}
Years	Club	Games (Goals)
1921, 1923, 1925	South Melbourne	6 (5)
1922	Williamstown (VFA)	7 (3)
1925	Port Melbourne (VFA)	3 (2)
- ^{1} Playing statistics correct to the end of 1925.

Herbert Ernest Russell (7 June 1899 – 9 April 1983) was an Australian rules footballer who played for the South Melbourne Football Club in the Victorian Football League (VFL).

== Family ==
The son of Alfred Russell (1863–1947), and Mary Jane Russell (1866–1941), née Bray, Herbert Ernest Russell was born on 7 June 1899.
