= Fred Condon =

Australian rules footballer

Personal information
- Full name: Frederick James Condon
- Born: 1 March 1903; South Melbourne, Victoria
- Died: 8 June 1965 (aged 62); East Melbourne, Victoria
- Original team: Leopold
- Height: 174 cm (5 ft 9 in)
- Weight: 66 kg (146 lb)

Playing career^{1}
Years	Club	Games (Goals)
1925–1926	South Melbourne	10 (4)
- ^{1} Playing statistics correct to the end of 1926.

Frederick James Condon (1 March 1903 – 8 June 1965) was an Australian rules footballer who played with South Melbourne in the Victorian Football League (VFL).
