= Ossy Parks =

Australian rules footballer, born 1914

Personal information
- Full name: Osborne Samuel Parks
- Born: 10 October 1914; Geelong, Victoria
- Died: 2 October 1992 (aged 77)
- Original team: Yarraville
- Height: 179 cm (5 ft 10 in)
- Weight: 83 kg (183 lb)
- Position: Defence

Playing career^{1}
Years	Club	Games (Goals)
1938–42	North Melbourne	64 (4)
- ^{1} Playing statistics correct to the end of 1942.

Osborne Samuel Parks (10 October 1914 – 2 October 1992) was an Australian rules footballer who played with North Melbourne in the Victorian Football League (VFL).
