= Fred Pitt =

Australian rules footballer

Personal information
- Full name: Frederick William Pitt
- Born: 28 February 1883; North Melbourne, Victoria
- Died: 17 November 1935 (aged 52); South Melbourne, Victoria

Playing career^{1}
Years	Club	Games (Goals)
1905	South Melbourne	1 (0)
- ^{1} Playing statistics correct to the end of 1905.

Frederick William Pitt (28 February 1883 – 17 November 1935) was an Australian rules footballer who played with South Melbourne in the Victorian Football League (VFL).
