= Percy Smith (Australian footballer) =

Australian rules footballer

Personal information
- Full name: Percy Reginald Victor Smith
- Born: 30 September 1887; Melbourne, Victoria
- Died: 24 May 1974 (aged 86); Brunswick, Victoria
- Original team: Leopold

Playing career^{1}
Years	Club	Games (Goals)
1912	Richmond	4 (1)
- ^{1} Playing statistics correct to the end of 1912.

Percy Smith (30 September 1887 – 24 May 1974) was an Australian rules footballer who played with Richmond in the Victorian Football League (VFL).
