= Jim Makin =

Australian rules footballer

Personal information
- Full name: James Joseph Makin
- Born: 22 June 1896; North Melbourne, Victoria
- Died: 7 May 1977 (aged 80); Oceanside, California
- Original teams: Leopold, AIF
- Height: 185 cm (6 ft 1 in)
- Weight: 80 kg (176 lb)

Playing career^{1}
Years	Club	Games (Goals)
1919, 1921–22	South Melbourne	30 (5)
1923	Melbourne	16 (1)
Total		46 (6)
- ^{1} Playing statistics correct to the end of 1923.

James Joseph Makin (22 June 1896 – 7 May 1977) was an Australian rules footballer who played with South Melbourne and Melbourne in the Victorian Football League (VFL).
