= Alf Gough (footballer, born 1888) =

Australian rules footballer

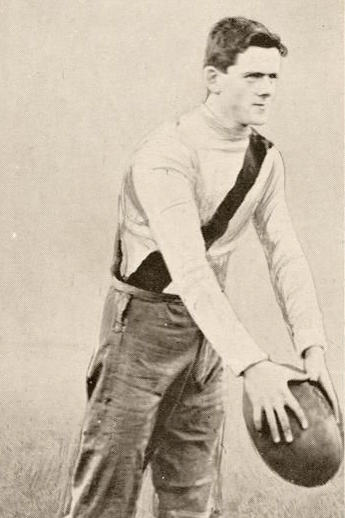
- Gough in 1910

Personal information
- Full name: Alphonsus Liguori Gough
- Born: 8 March 1888; Tarrawingee, Victoria
- Died: 22 April 1930 (aged 42); Ormond, Victoria
- Original team: Leopold

Playing career^{1}
Years	Club	Games (Goals)
1908–1911, 1915	South Melbourne	63 (47)
- ^{1} Playing statistics correct to the end of 1915.

Alf Gough (8 March 1888 – 22 April 1930) was an Australian rules footballer who played with South Melbourne in the Victorian Football League (VFL).

== Football ==
Gough was a forward pocket and second rover for South Melbourne in their 1909 premiership team. He kicked South Melbourne's fourth and final goal, in the third quarter, which helped them secure a two-point win. In 1910 he did not miss a single game and he appeared in the opening 16 rounds of the 1911 VFL season.

He then spent some time in New South Wales, playing for Sydney club Paddington. He returned to South Melbourne for one final season in 1915.
