= Ernest Cazaly =

Australian rules footballer

Personal information
- Full name: Ernest Arthur John Cazaly
- Born: 2 March 1886; Fitzroy, Victoria
- Died: 3 January 1940 (aged 53); Heidelberg, Victoria
- Original team: Leopold

Playing career^{1}
Years	Club	Games (Goals)
1910, 1919	St Kilda	2 (0)
- ^{1} Playing statistics correct to the end of 1919.

Ernest Arthur John Cazaly (2 March 1886 – 3 January 1940) was an Australian rules footballer who played with St Kilda in the Victorian Football League (VFL).
