= Alex Holland (footballer) =

Australian rules footballer

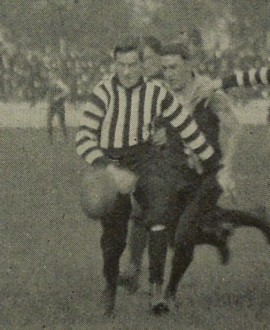
- Holland during his career with Collingwood

Personal information
- Full name: Alexander Patrick Holland
- Born: 19 April 1884; Melbourne, Victoria
- Died: 28 November 1933 (aged 49); Albert Park, Victoria
- Original team: Camberwell

Playing career^{1}
Years	Club	Games (Goals)
1906–1907	Collingwood	15 (0)
1908	Melbourne	1 (0)
Total		16 (0)
- ^{1} Playing statistics correct to the end of 1908.

Alexander Patrick Holland (19 April 1884 – 28 November 1933) was an Australian rules footballer who played for the Collingwood Football Club and Melbourne Football Club in the Victorian Football League (VFL).
