= Curtain raiser =

Short act or show that precedes the main attraction

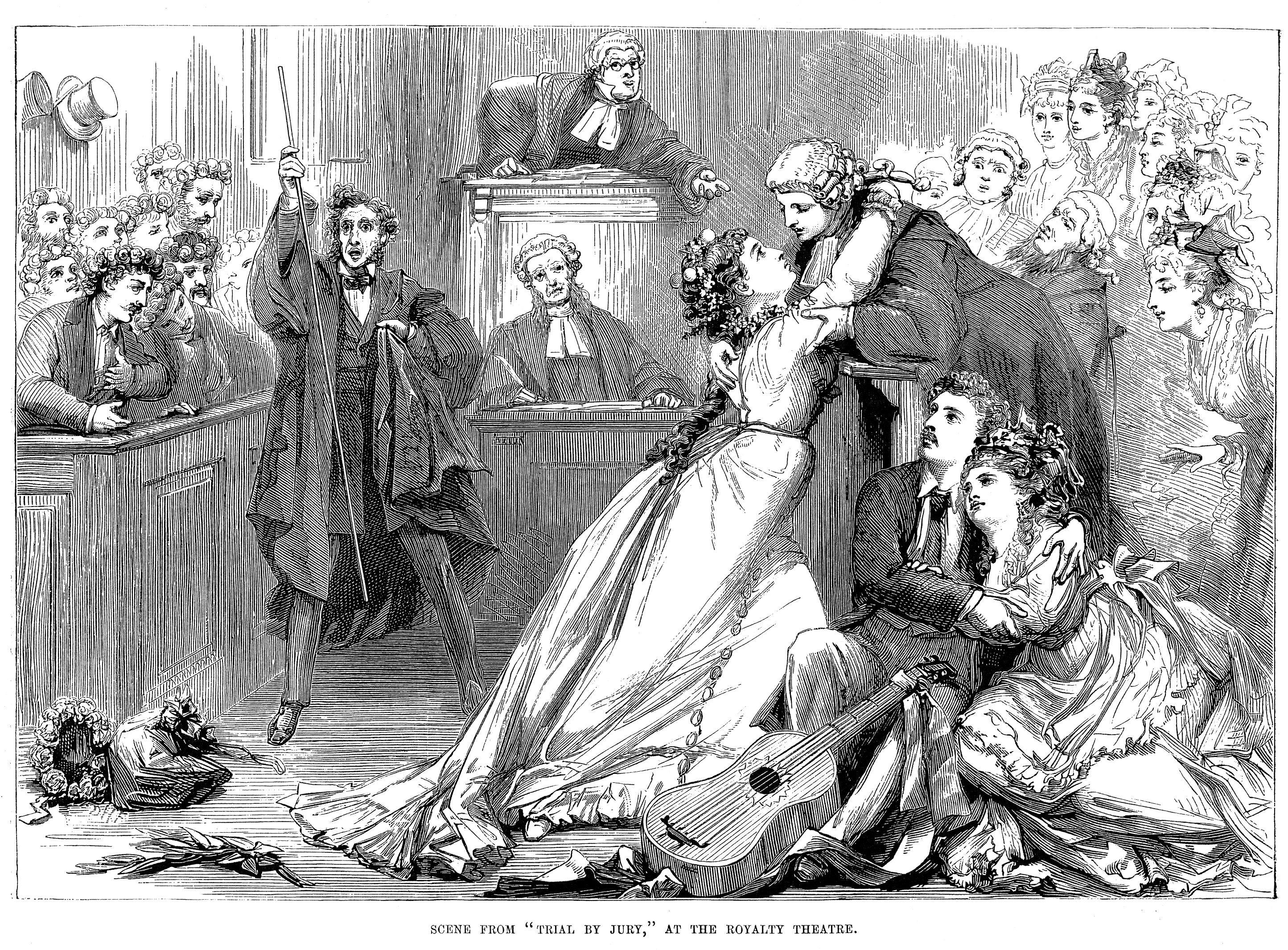
Trial by Jury, 1875 one-act opera used as a curtain raiser to La Perichole and other works

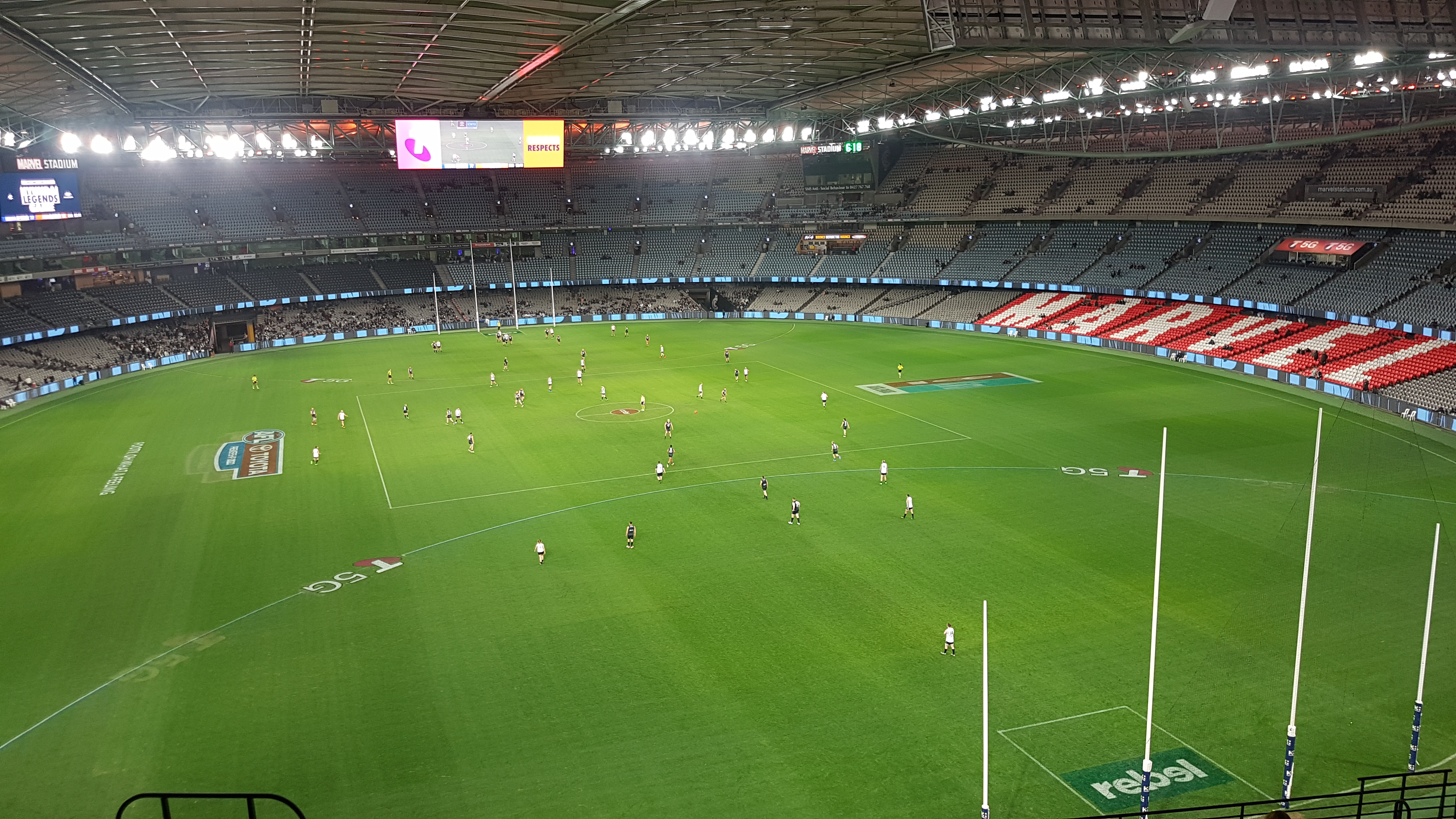
Curtain raiser featuring youth teams prior to an Australian Football League game in Melbourne

A curtain raiser is a performance or performer that opens a show or event for the main attraction; it is usually shorter than the main attraction, but not always. The term is derived from the act of raising the stage curtain.

The fashion in the late Victorian era and Edwardian era was to present long evenings in the theatre, and so full-length pieces were often presented together with, usually shorter, companion pieces. Each full-length work was normally accompanied by one or two short companion pieces. If the piece began the performance, it was called a curtain raiser. One that followed the full-length piece was called an afterpiece. W. J. MacQueen-Pope commented, concerning the curtain raisers:

This was a one-act play, seen only by the early comers. It would play to empty boxes, half-empty upper circle, to a gradually filling stalls and dress circle, but to an attentive, grateful and appreciative pit and gallery. Often these plays were little gems. They deserved much better treatment than they got, but those who saw them delighted in them ... they served to give young actors and actresses a chance to win their spurs ... the stalls and the boxes lost much by missing the curtain-raiser, but to them dinner was more important.

In Australian rules football, it is customary to have a youth game or lower-division "curtain-raiser" game prior to the start of some games.

== See also ==
- Support act
- Super cup
