= 1900 MJFA season =

9th season of the Metropolitan Junior Football Association

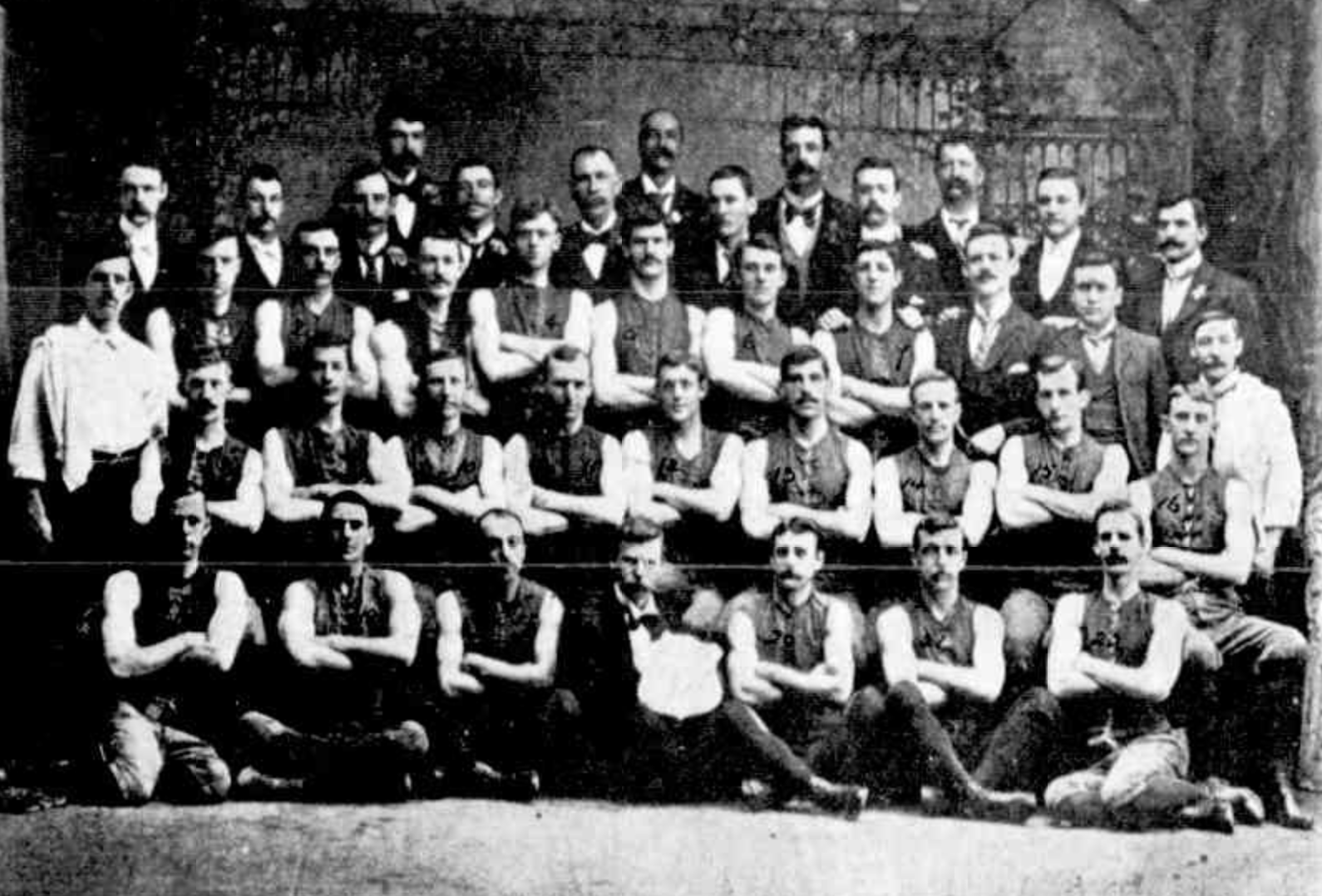
- Leopold – 1900 MJFA premiers
- Date: ended 22 September 1900
- Teams: 9
- Premiers: Leopold; 1st premiership
- Minor premiers: Leopold; 1st minor premiership

The 1900 MJFA season, also known as the 1900 MFA season, was the 9th season of the Metropolitan Junior Football Association (MJFA).

Leopold won the MJFA premiership for the first time, defeating South Melbourne Juniors in the 1900 MJFA Grand Final. This was the first time a grand final had been held in the MJFA, as prior to this season it was not necessary.

== Association name ==
On 27 March 1900, the MJFA decided on a change of name to the Metropolitan Football Association (MFA). MJFA president Lawrence Adamson believed that his association was now a senior competition and the "junior" label no longer applied.

Adamson brokered a deal that the existing MFA (of 1899) became the MJFA, giving his MJFA (of 1892) the "Metropolitan Football Association" name.

Despite this, various newspaper reports from 1900 until 1912 still use the MJFA (or simply "Metropolitan Junior Association") name when referring to Adamson's competition. Most consensus is that "MJFA" in this time period refers to the now-VAFA, and the VAFA's official history continues to use the MJFA name until 1912.

== Association membership ==
Like the previous season in 1899, a total of nine teams competed in the MJFA. St Francis Xavier and South St Kilda both disbanded during the 1899 season, while Parkville left at the end of the season.

Three new clubs − Celtic, South Melbourne Juniors and St Ignatius − entered the association. South Melbourne Juniors was formed by the South Melbourne Football Club on 29 March 1900, acting as the junior (reserves) team for the senior club.

In April 1900, The Argus reported Alberton, Scotch Collegians (both last competed in 1895), South Yarra (last competed in 1898) and South St Kilda were interested in re-joining the MJFA. However, none returned for the 1900 season.

== Ladder ==
St Ignatius won a game over Caulfield on protest.

Pos	Team	Pld	W	L	D	PF	PA	Pts
1	Leopold (P)	16	15	1	0	1010	261	60
2	South Melbourne Juniors	16	15	1	0			60
3	Collegians	16	11	5	0			44
4	Caulfield	16	8	8	0			32
5	St Ignatius	16	7	9	0			28
6	Beverley	16	6	10	0			24
7	Kew	16	5	11	0			20
8	Celtic	16	3	13	0			12
9	Brighton	16	2	14	0			8

(P) Premiers; (W) Club withdrew

== Grand Final ==
At the time, the MJFA premiership was decided by the best overall record for the season. In the event of a tie, a playoff match would have been held.

1900 was the first time in MJFA history that such a match was required, with Leopold and South Melbourne Juniors finishing with 60 premiership points each.

1900 MJFA Grand Final
Saturday, 22 September	Leopold	def.	South Melbourne Juniors	South Melbourne Cricket Ground
1.3 (9); 3.7 (25); 4.9 (33); 7.10 (52)	Q1; Q2; Q3; Final	0.2 (2); 0.3 (3); 0.5 (5); 2.8 (20)
