= East Caulfield Football Club =

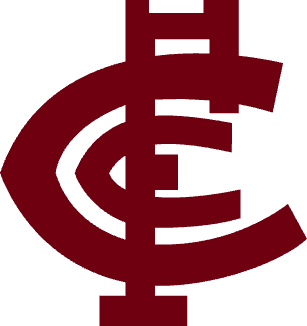

Names
- Full name: East Caulfield Football Club
- Former name(s): Caulfield Football Club (1890s−1970); Caulfield-Malvern Football Club (1915)
- Nickname: Fieldsmen

Club details
- Founded: 1890s
- Dissolved: Late 1976; 50 years ago
- Ground: Caulfield Park; East Caulfield Reserve

Uniforms
Home (1932−1976)	Home (1890s−1931)

The East Caulfield Football Club, known as the Caulfield Football Club for most of its history, was an Australian rules football club based around the Melbourne suburbs of Caulfield and Caulfield East. It was considered one of the strongest clubs in the Federal Football League (FFL).

The Sporting Globe wrote in 1933 that there were hopes the club would join the Victorian Football League (VFL) "in the near future", but this never eventuated (although the club almost joined in the VFL's reserves competition in 1919).

East Caulfield wore a dark maroon jumper with a navy blue collar, having originally worn a black jumper with a yellow sash (similar to Richmond and Glenelg).

== History ==
=== Formation and pre-Federal years ===
Caulfield was founded in the 1890s and joined the Metropolitan Junior Football Association (MJFA) in 1894. In 1915, the club combined with Malvern and became known as Caulfield-Malvern. The MAFA cancelled its next four seasons as a result of World War I.

The club (once again known simply as Caulfield) resumed in 1919 and affiliated with senior VFL club Melbourne, joining the Victorian Junior Football League (VJFL), the VFL's new reserves competition, for its inaugural season in 1919. However, it withdrew from the VJFL shortly before the season began, and a second University team was quickly arranged to take its place. Caulfield then attempted to rejoin the MAFA (which resumed its competition in 1920 MAFA season), but their application was refused as the club's reputation was seen as "intolerable" prior to the war.

Caulfield competed in various leagues until eventually joining the VFL Sub-Districts in 1926.

=== Federal League ===
In 1932, Caulfield joined the Federal District Football League (FDFL, later FFL). The club had a successful start in the competition, finishing second on the ladder in 1933 before being eliminated in the finals series, with former Melbourne player Harry Bruce captaining the side while Frank Nolan kicked 116 goals for the season. At the time, they were the only club in the FDFL without an enclosed home ground.

During the 1937 season, the club announced on 29 July that it would withdraw for the remainder of the season due to financial difficulties. This was despite the club stating it was in a "very sound" financial position only four months earlier in March 1937.

Following a loss to Highett on 2 June 1951, a man believed to be associated with Caulfield struck a goal umpire. On 15 June 1951, Caulfield's senior and junior teams were temporarily suspended by the FDFL after club officials failed to produce the man to the league tribunal, claiming they could not locate him.

At the conclusion of the 1970 season, Caulfield changed its name to East Caulfield to avoid confusion with the Caulfield Football Club, which had been founded in 1965 and competed in the Victorian Football Association (VFA).

East Caulfield disbanded at the end of the 1976 season.

== Notable players ==
A number of Caulfield/East Caulfield players later joined clubs in the VFL, now known as the Australian Football League (AFL), as well as the Victorian Football Association (VFA).

- Frank Nolan − Hawthorn and Oakleigh
- Viv Randall − Hawthorn and Camberwell
- Roy McEachen − South Melbourne
- Neil Crompton − former Melbourne player who captain-coached Caulfield in 1970

== Other clubs ==
Caulfield/East Caulfield is not to be confused with:

- Caulfield Football Club (1965−1988), which competed in the VFA
- Caulfield Football Club (1983−1984), which competed in the SESFL
- Caulfield Amateur Football Club (1946−1971)
- Caulfield City Football Club (1924−1959), formerly known as Caulfield
- Caulfield District Football Club (1939−1955)
- East Caulfield Football Club (1935−1951), which competed in the ESFL and VAFA
