= South Yarra Football Club =

South Yarra

Names
- Full name: South Yarra Football Club
- Nickname: Lions

2017 season
- After finals: DNQ
- Home-and-away season: 6th
- Best and fairest: Ben Guy Hough

Club details
- Founded: 1967; 59 years ago
- Colours
- Competition: Southern Football League
- Premierships: 1971, 1988, 1993, 2008, 2019
- Ground: Fritsch Holzer Park

Uniforms
Home

The South Yarra Football Netball Club is an Australian rules football and netball club located in the southern suburbs of Melbourne. The club participates in the Southern Football League, based in the south and south eastern suburbs of Melbourne, Victoria.

== History ==
The club was established in 1967

The club has changed its name several times over the years.

- 1968 - South Yarra Presbyterian FC
- 1972 - South Yarra Methodists FC.
- 1977 - South Yarra Uniting FC.
- 1982 - South Yarra FC in 1982.

== Senior premierships ==
- Eastern Suburban Churches Football Association.
  - 1971 (E grade), 1988 (E grade)
- Southern Football League
  - 1993 (Division 4), 2008 (Division 3)
- Southern Football Netball League
  - 2019 (Division 4)

== Other South Yarra clubs ==
=== The original South Yarra Football Club ===
A South Yarra Football Club was formed in Melbourne in 1858 or 1859, and was notable as one of the earliest Australian rules football clubs. The club, along with the original St Kilda, was influential in 1859 and 1860 in assisting the Melbourne Football Club create codified rules, which developed into the game of today. The club was strong through the 1860s, and won the Athletic Sports Committee Challenge Cup in 1866. The club significantly weakened in the late 1860s, and disbanded in mid-1873, many of its members having broken away to form the present day St Kilda Football Club.

=== South Yarra Standard Football Club ===
This club formed in 1874-75, two years after the original South Yarra folded. It was formed by old South Yarra players and supporters, including Judge Thomas Howard Fellows. In 1881, they got permission from the council to play on the East side of Albert Park. Despite this, they would never return to senior status as players from their districts were playing in other districts. The club was dissolved to form a new stronger club.

In April 1882, they gave their funds and equipment to the Southern Club, who they wanted to be a strong district team.

=== South Yarra Football Club (2nd) ===
Another South Yarra Football Club existed in 1879 as a junior team. They disbanded before the start of the 1885 season.

=== South Yarra Football Club (3rd) ===
In 1887, a junior club formed, and 1896 they finished third in the Suburban Juniors Football Association.

In 1897, the club decided to leave the Suburban Association for the Metropolitan Association. This meant the club colours had to change to a blue jersey with a yellow band and yellow and blue stockings.

It was still playing as Christ Church South Yarra in 1951, as a social football club.

=== South Yarra Baptist Football Club ===
This club was formed as a social club in 1907.

=== South Yarra Junior Football Club ===
There have also been a few South Yarra Junior teams: one formed in 1899 and was still running in 1901.

=== South Yarra Star Football Club ===
In 1895 this team wore the colours of red and white with a blue sash.

=== Southern Football Club ===
Southern was a district team of the neighbouring suburbs of South Yarra and Prahran. They played in Fawkner Park and their games were well supported by the community. After they lost strength with members moving out of the area, the club folded in 1899 after Prahran Football Club joined the VFA.
