= 1896 MJFA season =

5th season of the Metropolitan Junior Football Association

- Teams: 10
- Premiers: Collegians; 2nd premiership
- Minor premiers: Collegians; 2nd minor premiership
- Wooden spooners: Windsor

The 1896 MJFA season was the 5th season of the Metropolitan Junior Football Association (MJFA).

Collegians won their second MJFA premiership, having won 15 of its 18 games.

== Association membership ==
Like the previous season in 1895, a total of 10 teams competed in the MJFA. Alberton and Scotch Collegians both left the competition, while Malvern and Old Melburnians (a predecessor to the present-day Old Melburnians Football Club) were admitted into the association.

== Ladder ==
The Brighton Southern Cross ladder published on 5 September lists Windsor with three wins, while the ladder from The Age published on 9 September lists them with two wins. The ladder from The Age also does not include Malvern or Nunawading.

Furthermore, although Nunawading has one win (4 points) and four draws (8 points), The Age lists them with 10 points.

Pos	Team	Pld	W	L	D	GF	GA	Pts
1	Collegians (P)	18	15	2	1	112	37	62
2	Caulfield	18	11	4	3	62	40	50
3	Waltham	18	11	4	3	81	59	50
4	South St Kilda	18	11	6	1	55	57	46
5	Brighton	18	10	7	1	63	58	42
6	St Mary's	18	8	7	3	48	46	38
7	Malvern	16	7	8	1	51	42	28
8	Old Melburnians	18	5	12	1	31	80	22
9	Nunawading	17	1	12	4	41	60	12
10	Windsor	18	2	15	1	30	91	10

(P) Premiers; (W) Club withdrew

== Notable events ==
- L.A. Adamson became the MJFA's second president, while A.F. Morrow became secretary and treasurer.
