= 1898 MJFA season =

7th season of the Metropolitan Junior Football Association

- Teams: 9
- Premiers: Collegians; 3rd premiership
- Minor premiers: Collegians; 3rd minor premiership

The 1898 MJFA season was the seventh season of the Metropolitan Junior Football Association (MJFA).

Collegians won their third MJFA premiership, having won 14 of its 16 games.

== Association membership ==
Like the previous season in 1897, a total of nine teams competed in the MJFA. Waltham disbanded during the 1897 season, while Boroondara appears to have withdrawn several weeks later.

Beverley and Leopold were both admitted into the competition.

=== St Mary's expulsion ===
In June 1898, (Note: "A Brief History of the VAFA" gives the expulsion date as 7 June 1898, however the club was reported − on 10 June − as having a game against Windsor on 11 June 1898.) the MJFA disqualified St Mary's for the remainder of the season and expelled the club from the association. According to the Brighton Southern Cross, the expulsion was for "rough play" and "necessary in the best interests of the game".

=== South Yarra withdrawal ===
Sometime in July 1898, South Yarra withdrew from the MJFA. They had played six games prior to this, winning two and drawing the remaining four.

== Ladder ==
Pos	Team	Pld	W	L	D	Pts
1	Collegians (P)	16	14	0	2	62
2	Caulfield	16	10	3	3	46
3	Leopold	16	9	5	2	40
4	Brighton	16	9	6	1	38
5	South St Kilda	16	9	6	1	38
6	Beverley	16	6	6	4	32
7	Windsor	16	4	11	1	18
−	South Yarra (W)	6	2	0	4	8
−	St Mary's (E)	4	2	0	2	8

(P) Premiers; (W) Club withdrew; (E) Club expelled
