= 1904 MJFA season =

13th season of the Metropolitan Junior Football Association

- Teams: 10
- Premiers: Collegians; 5th premiership
- Minor premiers: Port Rovers; 1st minor premiership
- Wooden spooners: Hawthorn; 1st wooden spoon

The 1904 MJFA season, also known as the 1904 MFA season, was the 13th season of the Metropolitan Junior Football Association (MJFA). (Note: In 1900, the Metropolitan Junior Football Association (MJFA, now VAFA) decided on a change of name to the Metropolitan Football Association (MFA). MJFA president Lawrence Adamson brokered a deal that the existing MFA (of 1899) became the MJFA, giving his MJFA (of 1892) the "Metropolitan Football Association" name. Despite this, various newspaper reports from 1900 until 1912 still use the MJFA name when referring to Adamson's competition, most consensus is that "MJFA" in this time period refers to the now-VAFA, and the VAFA's official history continues to use the MJFA name until 1912.)

Collegians won the MJFA premiership for the sixth time, defeating Port Rovers in the 1904 MJFA Grand Final. This was the third time a grand final had been held in the MJFA.

== Association membership ==
All nine teams that participated in the 1903 MJFA season continued in 1904. Applications to join the competition came from Elsternwick and Sherwood, Fitzroy Baptist, Rose of Northcote, Parkville, Melburnians and Caulfield Collegians.

Ultimately, the MJFA was only able to admit one club, and Fitzroy Baptist was chosen on the condition that the club changed its name to Fitzroy District Football Club, which it did.

== Ladder ==
Pos	Team	Pld	W	L	D	Pts
1	Port Rovers	18	16	2	0	64
2	Collegians (P)	18	16	2	0	64
3	Leopold	18	12	6	0	48
4	Caulfield	18	11	7	0	44
5	South Yarra	18	10	8	0	40
6	Fitzroy District	18	9	9	0	36
7	Brighton	18	5	12	1	22
8	Boroondara	18	4	12	1	18
9	Beverley	18	3	13	2	16
10	Hawthorn	18	2	16	0	8

(P) Premiers; (W) Club withdrew

== Grand Final ==
At the time, the MJFA premiership was decided by the best overall record for the season. In the event of a tie, a playoff match would have been held.

1904 was the third time in MJFA history that such a match was required (the other times being 1900 and 1902), with Collegians and Brighton finishing with 64 premiership points each.

1904 MJFA Grand Final
Saturday, 10 September	Port Rovers	def. by	Collegians	Richmond City Reserve
1.4 (10); 1.4 (10); 3.6 (24); 4.8 (32)	Q1; Q2; Q3; Final	0.2 (2); 2.8 (20); 4.14 (38); 9.17 (71)	Umpires: Arthur Norden
Ward, Stone, W. Kerr, Kilpatrick	Goals	Brown 3, Prout 2, Dinsmore, Gravenall, Stewart, Rainey
Gordon, Baptiste, Blair, W. Kerr, Haysome	Best	Stewart, Kennedy, McKellar, Prout, Gravenall, Johnson, Paul, Speirs

=== Teams ===
Port Rovers
B:	Simmonds	Insall	Jackson
HB:	Baptist	Blair	Gordon
C:	Prentice	W. Kerr	Haysome
HF:	Kilpatrick	Higgins	Deas
F:	Ward	Stone	Beard
Foll:	West (c)	Hair	Amy

Collegians
B:	McPetrie	Batson	Paul
HB:	Speirs	Boynton	Seiaz
C:	Kennedy	Woodhouse	Atkinson
HF:	Rainey	Coriner	S. Gravenall
F:	H.J. Stewart (c)	Brown	Dinsmore
Foll:	McKellar	Johnson	Prout
