= 1897 MJFA season =

6th season of the Metropolitan Junior Football Association

- Teams: 9
- Premiers: South St Kilda; 4th premiership
- Minor premiers: South St Kilda; 4th minor premiership

The 1897 MJFA season was the sixth season of the Metropolitan Junior Football Association (MJFA).

South St Kilda won its fourth MJFA premiership, having finished won 15 of its 16 games. This was the club's final premiership before it disbanded during the 1899 season.

== Association membership ==
Nine clubs competed in the MJFA in 1897, one less than the previous season in 1896. Malvern and Old Melburnians both withdrew after their inaugural seasons, while Nunawading also left after three seasons in the competition.

South Yarra and Boroondara were both admitted into the association.

=== Waltham withdrawal ===
On 5 June, Waltham were scheduled to play against Caulfield but did not appear, with the match awarded to Caulfield. The club formally withdrew prior to the next round on 12 June, having lost all of its four games, and disbanded three days later on 15 June.

== Ladder ==
Boroondara appears to have withdrawn sometime in the latter half of the season, and were not included in end-of-season ladders published by the Oakleigh Leader and Brighton Southern Cross. The club did not play any recorded games in September 1897.

Pos	Team	Pld	W	L	D	GF	GA	Pts
1	South St Kilda (P)	16	15	1	0	104	37	60
2	Collegians	16	13	3	0	96	37	52
3	Caulfield	16	10	6	0	50	52	40
4	South Yarra	16	8	6	2	68	54	36
5	Brighton	16	8	7	1	56	73	34
6	St Mary's	16	6	8	2	42	58	28
7	Windsor	16	6	9	1	32	53	26
−	Boroondara (W)	12	3	9	0	17	59	12
−	Waltham (W)	4	0	4	0	3	17	0

(P) Premiers; (W) Club withdrew

== Notable events ==
- A combined MJFA team played a game against the Fitzroy Football Club, with Fitzroy winning 5.16 (46) to 3.11 (29). The MJFA received 2 pounds, 12 shillings and 6 pence as its share of gate receipts from the game.
