= 1895 MJFA season =

4th season of the Metropolitan Junior Football Association

- Teams: 10
- Premiers: South St Kilda; 3rd premiership
- Minor premiers: South St Kilda; 3rd minor premiership

The 1895 MJFA season was the 4th season of the Metropolitan Junior Football Association (MJFA).

South St Kilda won the MJFA premiership for the third year in a row, having finished first on the ladder at the end of the season. St Mary's finished in second place.

== Association membership ==
Like the previous season in 1894, a total of 10 teams competed in the MJFA. Toorak-Grosvenor withdrew and folded during the 1894 season, and a club called Fitzroy Wesleys played at least one game in Toorak-Grosvenor's place. Fitzroy Wesleys did not return in 1895, with Waltham admitted into the association.

== Ladder ==
Pos	Team	Pld	W	L	D	GF	GA	Pts
1	South St Kilda (P)	18	15	2	1	93	39	62
2	St Mary's							
	Alberton							
	Brighton							
	Caulfield							
	Collegians							
	Nunawading							
	Scotch Collegians							
	Waltham							
	Windsor							

(P) Premiers; (W) Club withdrew
