= 1899 MJFA season =

8th season of the Metropolitan Junior Football Association

- Date: 22 April – 9 September 1899
- Teams: 9
- Premiers: Collegians; 4th premiership
- Minor premiers: Collegians; 4th minor premiership

The 1899 MJFA season was the eighth season of the Metropolitan Junior Football Association (MJFA). The season began on 22 April and concluded on 9 September.

Collegians won the MJFA premiership for the fourth time and the second year in a row, finishing first on the ladder with only one loss for the season.

== Association membership ==
Like the previous season in 1898, a total of nine teams competed in the MJFA. St Mary's had been expelled in June 1898, while South Yarra withdrew one month later.

Two new clubs entered the MJFA at the start of the 1899 season − Parkville and St Francis Xavier.

=== St Francis Xavier withdrawal ===
In May 1899, after the completion of round 4, St Francis Xavier disbanded. The Xaverian noted at the time that "we played one or two matches and some practice matches in this Association; but we were invariably beaten. We had no chance − boys played against men, the result was evident from the beginning. Repeated defeats caused our boys gradually to lose heart. The committee were consulted and thinking "discretion the better part of valour" we reluctantly resigned our place in the Association." One of St Francis Xavier's defeats included a 16.16 to 2.0 loss to Collegians.

Kew Football Club was chosen to fill the vacancy, having been competing in the Suburban Junior Football Association until that point, and it played in the MJFA for the remainder of the season.

=== South St Kilda withdrawal ===
One month later in July, South St Kilda − who had been MJFA premiers four times, including as recently as 1897 − also disbanded. They were not replaced by any other club during the season.

== Ladder ==
Kew was not included in the ladder at the end of the season published in The Age. The VAFA's official history stated that the "top two sides played off for [the] premiership", although this is not supported by contemporary sources.

Pos	Team	Pld	W	L	D	PF	PA	Pts
1	Collegians (P)	17	14	1	2			60
2	Leopold	17	10	4	3			46
3	Brighton	17	10	5	2			44
4	Parkville	17	7	6	4			36
5	Beverley	14	5	7	2	443	471	24
6	Caulfield	14	6	8	0			24
−	Kew							
−	South St Kilda (W)							
−	St Francis Xavier (W)		0					0

(P) Premiers; (W) Club withdrew
