= 1894 MJFA season =

3rd season of the Metropolitan Junior Football Association

- Teams: 10
- Premiers: South St Kilda; 2nd premiership
- Minor premiers: South St Kilda; 2nd minor premiership
- Wooden spooners: Brighton

The 1894 MJFA season was the 3rd season of the Metropolitan Junior Football Association (MJFA).

South St Kilda won the MJFA premiership for the second year in a row, having won 16 of its 18 games.

== Association membership ==
Following the end of the 1893 season, St Jude's, Olinda, University 2nd and YMCA left the MJFA.

Caulfield, Nunawading, Scotch Collegians and Windsor were admitted as new clubs. Scotch Collegians was a precursor to the Old Scotch Football Club, which later entered the competition in 1921.

=== Toorak-Grosvenor withdrawal ===
Toorak-Grosvenor played its final full match on 7 July, which was a loss against Alberton. By this point, they had only won 1 of their 9 games.

One week later, they forfeited their 14 July game against Caulfield. They resumed for a game against South St Kilda on 21 July, but after 10.8 to 0.0 was kicked against them, the match was abandoned at half-time and Toorak-Grosvenor disbanded as a club.

A club called Fitzroy Wesleys played at least one game in Toorak-Grosvenor's place.

== Ladder ==
Fitzroy Wesleys was not included in the ladder at the end of the season published in The Sportsman.

Pos	Team	Pld	W	L	D	A	Pts
1	South St Kilda (P)	18	16	1	1	1	66
2	Collegians	18	13	5	0	0	52
3	St Mary's	18	10	5	3	0	46
4	Alberton	18	8	6	4	0	40
5	Windsor	18	9	7	2	0	40
6	Caulfield	18	8	8	2	0	36
7	Scotch Collegians	18	6	9	3	0	30
8	Nunawading	18	6	9	3	0	30
9	Brighton	18	3	15	0	0	12
−	Fitzroy Wesleys	−	−	−	−	−	−
−	Toorak-Grosvenor (W)	10	1	6	2	1	8

(P) Premiers; (W) Club withdrew
