= 1893 MJFA season =

2nd season of the Metropolitan Junior Football Association

- Teams: 10
- Premiers: South St Kilda; 1st premiership
- Minor premiers: South St Kilda; 1st minor premiership

The 1893 MJFA season was the 2nd season of the Metropolitan Junior Football Association (MJFA).

South St Kilda won its first MJFA premiership, having finished first on the ladder at the end of the season. Alberton finished in second place.

== Association membership ==
Like the previous season in 1892, a total of 10 teams competed in the MJFA. Two new clubs, Olinda and University 2nd (a reserves team for Melbourne University), joined the MJFA.

Edlington, which had withdraw during the 1892 season, and Footscray District did not compete in 1893. Holy Trinity, which played several games after replacing Edlington, also did not return.

== Ladder ==
Pos	Team	Pld	W	L	D	GF	GA	Pts
1	South St Kilda (P)							
2	Alberton							
	St Jude's							
	Collegians							
	University 2nd							
	Olinda							
	Toorak-Grosvenor							
	St Mary's							
	Brighton							
	YMCA							

(P) Premiers; (W) Club withdrew
