= Gravenall =

Gravenall is a surname. Notable people with the surname include:

- Hannah Gravenall (born 1988), New Zealand hockey player
- Sam Gravenall (1885–1948), Australian football player
