= 1903 MJFA season =

12th season of the Metropolitan Junior Football Association

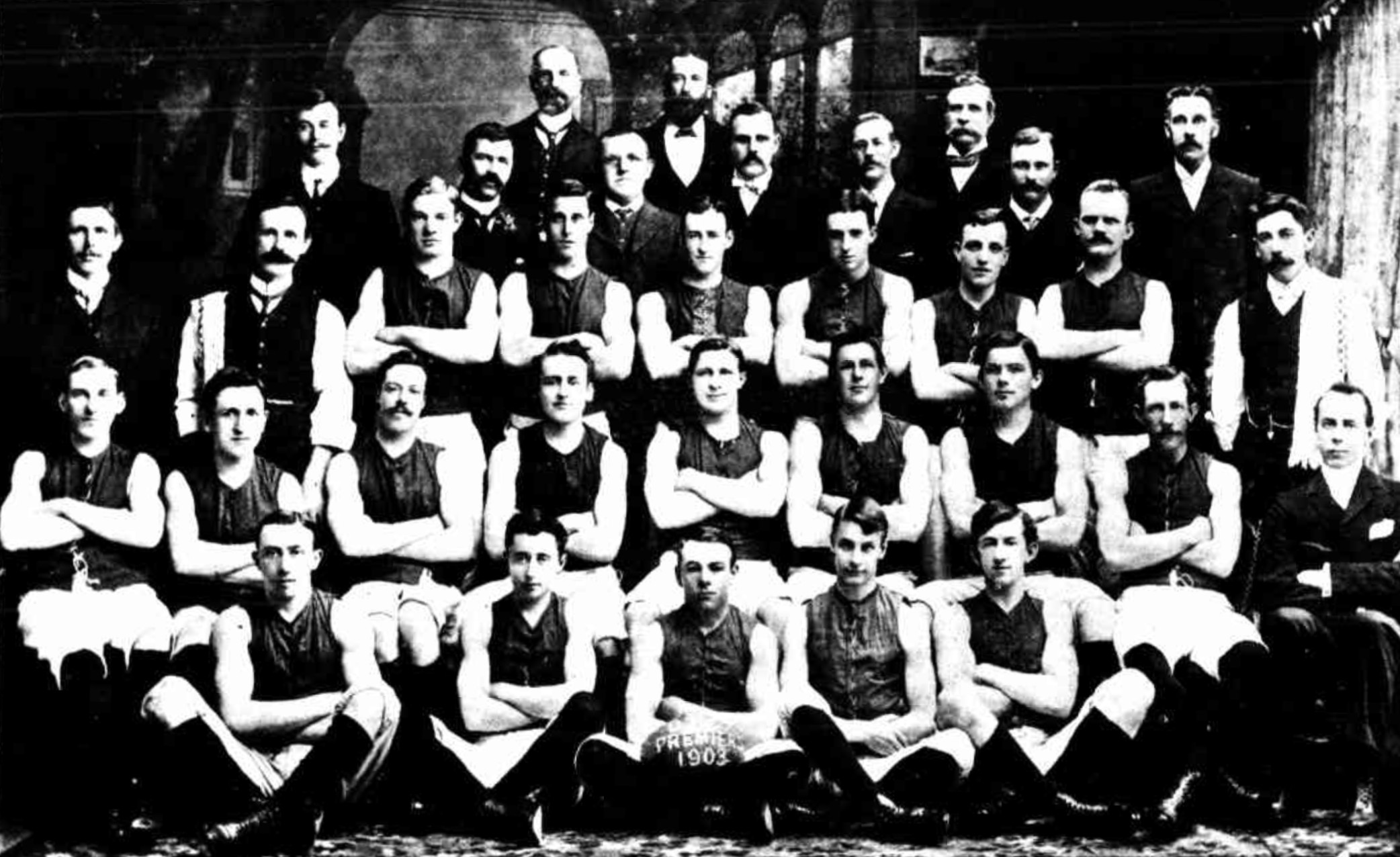
- Brighton – 1903 MJFA premiers
- Teams: 9
- Premiers: Brighton; 1st premiership
- Minor premiers: Brighton; 1st minor premiership

The 1903 MJFA season, also known as the 1903 MFA season, was the 12th season of the Metropolitan Junior Football Association (MJFA). (Note: In 1900, the Metropolitan Junior Football Association (MJFA, now VAFA) decided on a change of name to the Metropolitan Football Association (MFA). MJFA president Lawrence Adamson brokered a deal that the existing MFA (of 1899) became the MJFA, giving his MJFA (of 1892) the "Metropolitan Football Association" name. Despite this, various newspaper reports from 1900 until 1912 still use the MJFA name when referring to Adamson's competition, most consensus is that "MJFA" in this time period refers to the now-VAFA, and the VAFA's official history continues to use the MJFA name until 1912.)

Brighton won the MJFA premiership for the first time, finishing first on the ladder with only one loss for the entire season.

== Association membership ==
Like the previous season in 1902, a total of nine teams competed in the MJFA. Celtic had disbanded during the 1902 season, while St Ignatius – who had finished last – left the competition.

In their place, the Boroondara Football Club (which had previously competed in 1897 before going to into recess) was readmitted. The Port Rovers Football Club also entered the competition, playing practice games against Primrose and Essendon Town prior to round 1.

== Ladder ==
Pos	Team	Pld	W	L	D	Pts
1	Brighton (P)	16	15	1	0	60
2	Leopold	16	14	1	1	58
3	Collegians	16	12	4	0	48
4	Port Rovers	16	10	5	1	42
5	South Yarra	16	8	8	0	32
6	Caulfield	16	5	11	0	20
7	Hawthorn	16	4	12	0	16
8	Boroondara	16	2	14	0	8
9	Beverley	16	1	15	0	4

(P) Premiers; (W) Club withdrew

== Notable events ==
- The MJFA's annual report found that the 1903 season was the most successful in the competition's history.
