= Sam Gravenall =

Australian rules footballer and coach

Personal information
- Full name: Samuel Boyd Gravenall
- Born: 18 July 1885; Melbourne, Victoria
- Died: 8 March 1948 (aged 62); Wandsworth, London, England
- Original team: Wesley College, Melbourne
- Position: Forward

Playing career^{1}
Years	Club	Games (Goals)
1903, 1906, 1910	St Kilda	30 (15)

Coaching career
Years	Club	Games (W–L–D)
1922	Essendon	12 (7–4–1)
1927	Subiaco	19 (10–9–0)
- ^{1} Playing statistics correct to the end of 1927.

Samuel Boyd Gravenall (18 July 1885 – 8 March 1948), variously known as "Sam Gravenall" and "Boyd Gravenall", was an Australian rules footballer who played with St Kilda in the Victorian Football League (VFL).

== Family ==
The son of Samuel Boyd Gravenall (1862–1941), and Ida Tily Gravenall (1868–1945), née Browne, Samuel Boyd Gravenall was born on 18 July 1885.

He married Jane "Jennie" Godolphin Oats (1888–1940), at Prahran, Victoria on 6 July 1910. They had three children: Betty (1913–), and Donald William Gravenall (1917–1990), who became a respected swimming coach, and Barbara Ida (1927–1956).

External images
- Samuel Boyd Gravenall, Esq. with the Scotch College, Perth, First XI (1907) — Collection of the State Library of Western Australia.
- East Fremantle Football Club (1907) — Collection of the Fremantle City Library.
- Samuel Boyd Gravenall (1927) — Collection of the State Library of Western Australia.
- Samuel Boyd Gravenall, 2UE sports commentator, with Stan McCabe (Central Station, Sydney, 1934) — Collection of the National Library of Australia.
- Samuel Boyd Gravenall, 2UE sports commentator, with Arthur Chipperfield (Central Station, Sydney, 1934) — Collection of the National Library of Australia.

== Education ==
He entered Melbourne's Wesley College at the age of 14, having won a Government scholarship.

== Football ==
From Wesley College, Melbourne, Gravenall was a forward and had his first season at St Kilda in 1903. He didn't appear for the club again until 1906 and the following year went to Western Australia, who he represented at the inaugural Melbourne Carnival. After 41 games for North Fremantle he returned to Melbourne, where he was employed as a sports master at Wesley College. He played for St Kilda in 1910, and served as the team's captain.

=== Lawrence Adamson ===
Due to his strongly held views on the values inherent in amateur sport, and his disdain for the increasing professionalism of the Victorian Football League, Wesley's headmaster, Lawrence Adamson, who'd been educated at Rugby School in England, controversially refused to allow Gravenall to continue to play VFL football in 1911.

As a consequence, Gravenall retired as a VFL footballer at the end of the 1910 season; however, he did continue to play football, playing with Collegians Football Club, the Wesley College Old Boys' team, in the Metropolitan Junior Football Association (MAFA). Gravenall was part of Collegian's 1904 premiership team and played in the club's 1911 grand final loss to Leopold.

=== Coaching ===
He coached Essendon for 12 games in the 1922 VFL season, and for the 1927 season coached WAFL club Subiaco, who had played off in the previous three grand finals but only reached fourth.

He was the coach of the New South Wales team at the August 1933 Australian National Football Carnival, held in Sydney; and "there is little doubt that had … Mr. S.B. Gravenall, himself an interstate player, … had the full team together for a longer period, its performance would have been even better than they have been".

== After football ==
A larger than life character, in 1928 he was sentenced to six months in jail for contracting a debt of £125 without reasonable or probable grounds of being able to pay it.

In 1941, he was working in London as an Air Raid Warden.

== Death ==
Gravenall died in London in 1948.

== See also ==
- 1908 Melbourne Carnival
