= Reg Woodhouse =

Australian rules footballer

Personal information
- Full name: Reginald Woodhouse
- Born: 3 May 1877; Perth, Western Australia
- Died: 16 February 1965 (aged 87); Sandringham, Victoria
- Original team: Collegians
- Height: 175 cm (5 ft 9 in)
- Weight: 70 kg (154 lb)

Playing career^{1}
Years	Club	Games (Goals)
1906	Melbourne	2 (0)
- ^{1} Playing statistics correct to the end of 1906.

Reginald Woodhouse (3 May 1877 – 16 February 1965) was an Australian rules footballer who played with Melbourne in the Victorian Football League (VFL).
