= Fitzroy Reds =

Australian rules football club, 1954–2008

Names
- Full name: Fitzroy Reds Amateur Football Club
- Former name(s): University (E); University Reds Football Club (1954−1997)
- Nickname(s): Reds, Roys
- Former nickname: Uni Reds (1954–1997)

Club details
- Founded: 1954; 72 years ago
- Dissolved: 9 December 2008; 17 years ago
- Competition: VAFA (1955−64; 1973−2008); FFL (1971−72)
- President: Craig Little
- Premierships: VAFA (5): 1980; 1995; 2001; 2003; 2005
- Ground: Brunswick Street Oval (1991−2008); Crawford Oval; Princes Park; University Oval; Yarra Bend Oval

Uniforms
| Home | Away |

Other information
- Official website: fitzroyreds.com.au

The Fitzroy Reds was an Australian rules football club based in the Melbourne suburb of Fitzroy. The club was formed in 1954 as the University Reds (or simply Uni Reds), competing in the Victorian Amateur Football Association (VAFA).

In December 2008, the Reds merged with the Fitzroy Football Club, which became officially known as "Fitzroy Football Club (incorporating the Fitzroy Reds)".

== History ==
=== University Reds ===
Fitzroy Reds logo in 2002

University Reds was formed in 1954, joining the University Blacks and University Blues as the Melbourne University Football Club's third team in the VAFA for the 1955 season.

The club, which was originally in E Section and was known as "University (E)", provided opportunities for Blacks and Blues players who were not selected in either of those sides to get a regular match.

In 1964, the VAFA mandated reserves teams for all clubs. This forced the Reds to go into recess at the end of the season, however they soon returned and joined the Federal Football League (FFL) before returning to the VAFA in 1973 after two seasons in the FFL.

The Reds won their first seniors premiership in F Section in 1980.

=== Split from Melbourne University ===
Following the 1997 season, under increasing pressure from the Melbourne University Sports Union to meet the required number of undergraduate and post graduate registrations to obtain funding, the club split from the university and were renamed to Fitzroy Reds, with 1998 their first season competing under the new name.

In 2003, the Reds played a curtain-raiser match against West Brunswick at the Melbourne Cricket Ground before the Brisbane Lions met Collingwood during AFL Heritage Round.

=== Merger with Fitzroy ===
Fitzroy Reds logo in 2003

On 2 April 2008, Reds president Craig Little announced a plan to merge the club with the Fitzroy Football Club. Fitzroy had left the AFL following the 1996 season, but had not entirely disbanded and had a sponsorship arrangement with the Reds.

In December 2008, the Reds formally transferred all its assets to the Fitzroy Football Club. The Reds terminated its membership of the VAFA and was wound up as an incorporated company and football club.

By special dispensation from the VAFA, the Fitzroy Football Club then replaced the Reds in Division 1 of the VAFA, beginning in the 2009 season, fielding a senior and reserves side, as well as two under-19s sides and a Club XVIII side.

== Honours ==
=== Team of the Century (1955−2000) ===
| Back | Peter O'Keefe | Greg Cook (vice-captain) | Stephen Drury |
| Half-Back | Andrew White | Chris Anderson | Greg Thomas |
| Centre | Russell Heddles | Greg Roughsedge | Daniel Cahir |
| Half Forward | Paul James | Jack Clancy | Denis Fossa |
| Forward | Bruce Dare | Marc Marsden | Justin Doyle |
| Followers | Peter Clayden | Gerry Hardy | Michael Smale (captain) |
| Interchange | Charlie Hosking | Peter Barone | Patrick Jackson |
| Interchange | Ian Jennens | | |
| Coach | Andrew McNair | | |

== Seasons ==
| Premiers | Grand Finalist | Minor premiers | Finals appearance | Wooden spoon |

=== Seniors ===
| Year | League | Division | Finish | W | L | D | Coach | Captain | Best and fairest | Leading goalkicker | | Ref |
|---|---|---|---|---|---|---|---|---|---|---|---|---|
| 1955 | VAFA | E Section | | | | | | | | | | |
| 1956 | VAFA | | | | | | | | | Marc Marsden | 102 | |
| 1957 | VAFA | | | | | | | | | | | |
| 1958 | VAFA | E Section | 2nd | 16 | 2 | 0 | | | | Marc Marsden | 52 | |
| 1959 | VAFA | | | | | | | | | | | |
| 1960 | VAFA | | | | | | | | | L. Walker | 48 | |
| 1961 | VAFA | E Section | | | | | | | G. Hardy | | | |
| 1962 | VAFA | | | | | | | | | | | |
| 1963 | VAFA | | | | | | | | | | | |
| 1964 | VAFA | E Section | | | | | | | J. Clancy | | | |
| 1965 | VAFA | (In recess) | | | | | | | | | | |
| 1966 | VAFA | (In recess) | | | | | | | | | | |
| 1967 | VAFA | (In recess) | | | | | | | | | | |
| 1968 | VAFA | (In recess) | | | | | | | | | | |
| 1969 | VAFA | (In recess) | | | | | | | | | | |
| 1970 | VAFA | (In recess) | | | | | | | | | | |
| 1971 | FFL | | | | | | | | | | | |
| 1972 | FFL | | | | | | | | | | | |
| 1973 | VAFA | | | | | | K. Frencham | D. King | G. Courtis | P. Lipshut | 45 | |
| 1974 | VAFA | | | | | | K. Frencham | S. Maule | J. Clarke; G. Lipshut | D. King | 37 | |
| 1975 | VAFA | | | | | | K. Frencham | R. Sheppard | R. Grigg | L. Lachal | 29 | |
| 1976 | VAFA | | | | | | N. Sharpe | N. Sharpe | N. Sharpe | N. Sharpe | 42 | |
| 1977 | VAFA | | | | | | D. Cole | D. Cole | S. Bayley; G. Long | J. Sturm | 30 | |
| 1978 | VAFA | | | | | | Andrew McNair | R. Wright | M. Smale | Peter Hille | 42 | |
| 1979 | VAFA | | | | | | Andrew McNair | R. Wright | M. Smale | Peter Hille | 71 | |
| 1980 | VAFA | F Section | 1st | 16 | 2 | 0 | Andrew McNair | M. Smale | Chris Anderson | Peter Hille | 103 | |
| 1981 | VAFA | | | | | | Andrew McNair | M. Smale | P. Clayden | | | |
| 1982 | VAFA | | | | | | A. Holloway | G. Thomas | P. Clayden | | | |
| 1983 | VAFA | | | | | | G. Mahoney | Chris Anderson | Russell Heddles | | | |
| 1984 | VAFA | | | | | | I. Steward | I. Steward | G. Funston | | | |
| 1985 | VAFA | | | | | | I. Steward | I. Steward | Greg Roughsedge | | | |
| 1986 | VAFA | | | | | | R. Chitty | R. Chitty | Greg Roughsedge | | | |
| 1987 | VAFA | F Section | 9th | 6 | 12 | 0 | L. Duffus | Charlie Hosking | Greg Roughsedge | | | |
| 1988 | VAFA | | | | | | L. Duffus | Charlie Hosking | Greg Roughsedge | | | |
| 1989 | VAFA | | | | | | L. Duffus | Andrew White | Ian Jennens | | | |
| 1990 | VAFA | | | | | | L. Duffus | Andrew White | F. Godschan | | | |
| 1991 | VAFA | | | | | | G. Burgen | B. Condon | B. Kane | | | |
| 1992 | VAFA | | | | | | I. Ewing | G. Cook | P. Curry | | | |
| 1993 | VAFA | | | | | | I. Ewing | G. Cook | J. Doyle | | | |
| 1994 | VAFA | | | | | | I. Ewing | Andrew White | J. Doyle | | | |
| 1995 | VAFA | E Central | | | | | M. Farrell | B. Pickett | G. Wright | | | |
| 1996 | VAFA | | | | | | M. Farrell | B. Pickett | Stephen Drury; S. Rowland | | | |
| 1997 | VAFA | | | | | | J. Doyle | A. Jackson | Paul James | | | |
| 1998 | VAFA | | | | | | G. Hammond | M. Farrell | Peter Jackson | M. Farrell | 23 | |
| 1999 | VAFA | | | | | | G. Hammond | Stephen Drury | Jeremy Rawlins | C. Farrell | 32 | |
| 2000 | VAFA | | | | | | G. Hammond | Stephen Drury | Stephen Drury; S. Addicott | T. Mitchell | 21 | |
| 2001 | VAFA | Division 3 | 1st | | 0 | | Graham Burgen | Stephen Drury | Stephen Drury | D. Ronchi | 65 | |
| 2002 | VAFA | Division 2 | 6th | 8 | 10 | 0 | Graham Burgen | Stephen Drury | Stephen Drury | J. Tornese | 65 | |
| 2003 | VAFA | Division 2 | 2nd | 15 | 3 | 0 | Graham Burgen | Stephen Drury | T. Clarke | J. Tornese | 59 | |
| 2004 | VAFA | | | | | | Graham Burgen | T. Clarke; P. Diacogiorgis | B. Atherton | K.P. Cianci | 35 | |
| 2005 | VAFA | Division 1 | 1st | 17 | 1 | 0 | Graham Burgen | V. Cahill; P. Diacogiorgis | V. Cahill; M. Zika | Phil Cianci | 80 | |
| 2006 | VAFA | C Section | 6th | 8 | 10 | 0 | Graham Burgen | V. Cahill; Jeremy Rawlins | C. Meighen | K. Maghamez | 48 | |
| 2007 | VAFA | | | | | | Steve Maus | Tim Davis | C. Meighen | Nick Shuttleworth | 22 | |
| 2008 | VAFA | Division 1 | | 11 | | | James Taylor | Jimmy O'Reilly | Matthew Biggs | Leon Holderhead | 18 | |

=== Reserves ===
| Year | League | Division | Finish | W | L | D | Coach | Captain | Best and fairest | Leading goalkicker | | Ref |
|---|---|---|---|---|---|---|---|---|---|---|---|---|
| 1973 | VAFA | | | | | | | | | | | |
| 1974 | VAFA | | | | | | | | | | | |
| 1975 | VAFA | | | | | | | | | | | |
| 1976 | VAFA | | | | | | | | | | | |
| 1977 | VAFA | | | | | | | | | | | |
| 1978 | VAFA | | | | | | | | | | | |
| 1979 | VAFA | | | | | | | | | | | |
| 1980 | VAFA | F Section | 1st | 17 | 1 | 0 | | | | | | |
| 1981 | VAFA | | | | | | | | | | | |
| 1982 | VAFA | | | | | | | | | | | |
| 1983 | VAFA | | | | | | | | | | | |
| 1984 | VAFA | | | | | | | | | | | |
| 1985 | VAFA | | | | | | | | | | | |
| 1986 | VAFA | | | | | | | | | | | |
| 1987 | VAFA | F Section | 10th | 3 | 15 | 0 | | | | | | |
| 1988 | VAFA | | | | | | | | | | | |
| 1989 | VAFA | | | | | | | | | | | |
| 1990 | VAFA | | | | | | | | | | | |
| 1991 | VAFA | | | | | | | | | | | |
| 1992 | VAFA | | | | | | | | | | | |
| 1993 | VAFA | | | | | | | | | | | |
| 1994 | VAFA | | | | | | Tim Bell | | | | | |
| 1995 | VAFA | E Central | | | | | | | | | | |
| 1996 | VAFA | | | | | | | | | | | |
| 1997 | VAFA | | | | | | | | | | | |
| 1998 | VAFA | | | | | | D. Kane | | M. Frisby | E. Kyriacou | 37 | |
| 1999 | VAFA | | | | | | D. Kane | | G. Box | C. Prior | 64 | |
| 2000 | VAFA | | | | | | D. Kane | | G. Box | D. Kane | 39 | |
| 2001 | VAFA | | | | | | A. George | | J. Card | D. Kane | 56 | |
| 2002 | VAFA | Division 2 | 2nd | 16 | 2 | 0 | A. George | | A. Grant | D. Kane | 44 | |
| 2003 | VAFA | Division 2 | 3rd | 15 | 3 | 0 | D. Kane | | M. Baker | M. Foster; S. Pidotto | 19 | |
| 2004 | VAFA | | | | | | C. Tehan | Damian Hannam | Sam Baillie | R. Capodiferro | 40 | |
| 2005 | VAFA | Division 1 | 1st | 16 | 2 | 0 | C. Tehan | Sam Baillie | Sam Baillie | R. Capodiferro | 70 | |
| 2006 | VAFA | C Section | 3rd | 12 | 6 | 0 | C. Little | | N. Evans | J. Tornese | 59 | |
| 2007 | VAFA | | | | | | F. Cameron | C. Sullivan | P. Wood; E. Tice | D. Hannam | 36 | |
| 2008 | VAFA | Division 1 | | | | | F. Cameron | J. Nagorka | Jayred Dawson-Smith | Tristan Pinkster | 55 | |

=== Thirds ===
| Year | League | Division | Finish | W | L | D | Coach | Captain | Best and fairest | Leading goalkicker | | Ref |
|---|---|---|---|---|---|---|---|---|---|---|---|---|
| 2002 | VAFA | | | | | | G. Box | | J. Hamilton | N. Currie | 6 | |
| 2003 | VAFA | | | | | | G. Box | | T. Jackson | C. Prior | 29 | |
| 2004 | VAFA | | | | | | G. Box | | J. Grimmett | J. Grimmett | 54 | |
| 2005 | VAFA | | | | | | A. George | | S. McCarthy; T. Belleville | J. Grimmett; M. Foster; A. Walsh | 15 | |
| 2006 | VAFA | | | | | | A. George | Tim Campbell | D. Hannam | A. Dawson | 27 | |
| 2007 | VAFA | | | | | | A. George | A. Grant | R. Trigg | Gregg Crane | 21 | |
| 2008 | VAFA | | | | | | A. Grant | R. Hunter | Tim Campbell | | | |

=== Fourths ===
| Year | League | Division | Finish | W | L | D | Coach | Captain | Best and fairest | Leading goalkicker | | Ref |
|---|---|---|---|---|---|---|---|---|---|---|---|---|
| 2005 | VAFA | | | | | | C. Little | Tony Jackson | Tony Jackson | C. Prior | 23 | |
| 2006 | VAFA | | | | | | T. Leske | Tony Jackson | N. Schofield | M. Kelly | 27 | |
| 2007 | VAFA | | | | | | J. Steer | | D. Schleibs | Nick Auden | 27 | |

=== Under-19s ===
| Year | League | Division | Finish | W | L | D | Coach | Captain | Best and fairest | Leading goalkicker | | Ref |
|---|---|---|---|---|---|---|---|---|---|---|---|---|
| 2003 | VAFA | Red (2) | 3rd | 13 | 5 | 0 | Tim Bell | | M. Zika | K. Maghamez | 100 | |
| 2004 | VAFA | | | | | | Tim Bell | | M. Zika | K. Maghamez | 112 | |
| 2005 | VAFA | Red (2) | 6th | 9 | 9 | 0 | Tim Bell | | C. Dullard | K. McKenzie | 32 | |
| 2006 | VAFA | | | | | | Tim Bell | | K. Donato | Christopher Ligris | 52 | |
| 2007 | VAFA | | | | | | Tim Bell | | Matthew Biggs | | | |
| 2008 | VAFA | Section 1 | | | | | Tim Bell | | A. Harbor | Christopher Ligris; Luke Novello | 31 | |
| 2008 | VAFA | Section 2 | | | | | B. Edwards | | A. Harbor | Christopher Ligris; Luke Novello | 31 | |

=== Club XVIII ===
| Year | League | Division | Finish | W | L | D | Coach | Captain | Best and fairest | Leading goalkicker | Ref |
|---|---|---|---|---|---|---|---|---|---|---|---|
| 2002 | VAFA | North | 7th | 3 | 12 | 0 | | | | | |
| 2003 | VAFA | North | 3rd | 9 | 5 | 0 | | | | | |
| 2004 | VAFA | Section 2 | 3rd | | | | | | | | |
| 2005 | VAFA | Section 2 | 4th | 10 | 5 | 0 | | | | | |
| 2005 | VAFA | Section 3 | 3rd | 10 | 3 | 0 | | | | | |
| 2006 | VAFA | Section 2 | 3rd | 11 | 4 | 0 | | | | | |
| 2006 | VAFA | Section 3 | 2nd | 12 | 3 | 0 | | | | | |
| 2007 | VAFA | | | | | | | | | | |
| 2008 | VAFA | | | | | | | | | | |

=== Grand finals ===
| Premiers | Runners-up | Drawn |

| Year | League | Division | Grade | Opponent | Score | Venue | Date | Report |
|---|---|---|---|---|---|---|---|---|
| 1980 | VAFA | F Section | Seniors | Thomastown | | Beaurepaire Centre | 6 September 1980 | |
| 1981 | VAFA | | Seniors | | | | | |
| 1994 | VAFA | | Reserves | VUT | | | | |
| 1995 | VAFA | E Central | Seniors | | | | | |
| 2001 | VAFA | Division 1 | Seniors | | | | | |
| 2003 | VAFA | Division 2 | Seniors | Peninsula Old Boys | 12.9 (81) d. 9.12 (66) | Central Reserve | 13 September 2003 | |
| 2003 | VAFA | North | Club XVIII | Old Essendon | 11.7 (73) d. 7.2 (44) | | | |
| 2005 | VAFA | Division 1 | Reserves | Old Mentonians | 13.5 (93) d. 5.5 (35) | Box Hill City Oval | 10 September 2003 | |
| 2005 | VAFA | Division 1 | Seniors | Ormond | 24.6 (150) d. 10.11 (71) | Box Hill City Oval | 10 September 2003 | |
| 2006 | VAFA | Section 3 | Club XVIII | Old Essendon | 9.10 (64) d. 5.7 (37) | Elsternwick Park | 25 August 2006 | |
