= Victorian Amateur Football Association =

Australian rules football competition

- Current season, competition or edition: 2026 VAFA season
- Founded: 1892; 134 years ago
- CEO: Jason Reddick
- Divisions: 6
- No. of teams: 61
- State: Victoria
- Headquarters: Elsternwick Park
- Current premiers (2026): Premier: Uni Blues; Prem B: Collegians; Prem C: Parkdale Vultures; Div 1: Preston Bullants; Div 2: Power House; Div 3: Wattle Park
- Most premierships: Collegians (21 senior premierships)
- Streaming partner(s): KommunityTV; VAFA TV
- Official website: vafa.com.au

The Victorian Amateur Football Association (VAFA) is the largest senior community Australian rules football competition in Victoria. Founded in 1892, it consists of six senior divisions in the men's competition (Premier to Division 3) and seven senior divisions in the women's competition (Premier to Division 5).

In addition, the VAFA has under-19s and Thirds sections, primarily made up of either clubs only able to field one team, or clubs from higher sections that can field a third team after their seniors and reserves. The league operates a double promotion and relegation system between sections, with various rules dictating which section clubs can play in.

The VAFA's administration base is at Elsternwick Park, a former Victorian Football Association (VFA) ground that was home to the now-defunct Brighton Football Club, which is now the home for the Elsternwick Football Club and the Old Melburnians Football Club.

The VAFA comprises private school old boys clubs, university clubs and district clubs. No player payments are permitted, however players can be enticed by offers of employment. As of 2021, the VAFA has 14,000 male players and 4,000 female players.

== History ==
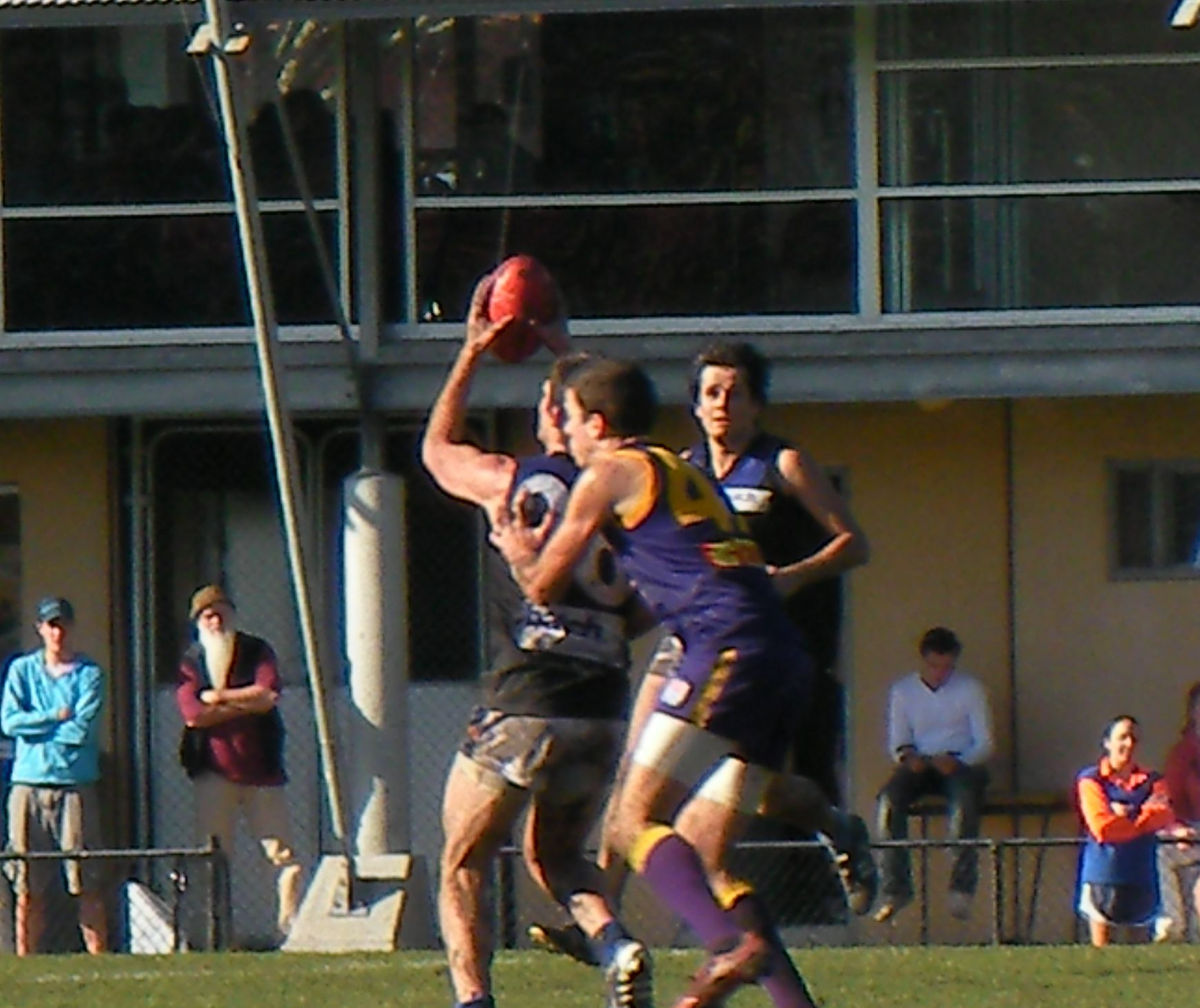
Collegians vs Melbourne University Blues at Collegians home ground at Albert Park

Public Schools and Football.
The question of public school boys playing in senior football has recently been raised.
It has been contended that the entry of prominent schoolboy players into the ranks of the senior football teams would be a boon to the game, and it is also reported that some schoolboys are likely to play with senior teams.
In view of these reports, the attitude of the headmasters is of interest.
They have laid down the rule that no boy while at school shall be permitted to play with any League or Association team, but no ban is placed on a boy who may wish to play with an amateur team, provided such games do not interfere with his duty to the school football team.
Table Talk, 26 April 1923.

=== MJFA ===
The VAFA was founded in 1892 as the Metropolitan Junior Football Association (MJFA). Ten clubs competed in the inaugural season − Alberton, Brighton, Collegians, Edlington, Footscray District, South St Kilda, St Jude's, St Mary's, Toorak-Grosvenor and YMCA. Edlington withdrew from the competition after two games, with extra games played against Holy Trinity by teams that were initially scheduled to play Edlington.

==== MFA name change ====
On 27 March 1900, the MJFA decided on a change of name to the Metropolitan Football Association (MFA). MJFA president Lawrence Adamson believed that his association was now a senior competition and the "junior" label no longer applied.

Adamson brokered a deal that the existing MFA (of 1899) became the MJFA, giving his MJFA (of 1892) the "Metropolitan Football Association" name.

Despite this, various newspaper reports from 1900 until 1912 still use the MJFA (or simply "Metropolitan Junior Association") name when referring to Adamson's competition. Most consensus is that "MJFA" in this time period refers to the now-VAFA, and the VAFA's official history continues to use the MJFA name until 1912.

=== MAFA ===
In 1912, the MJFA became the Metropolitan Amateur Football Association (MAFA).

Prior to World War I, apart from its core function of delivering a competition for amateur footballers, the MAFA also provided a de facto second-level competition for the VFL.

The 1915 home-and-away season was originally scheduled to end on 26 August. However, due to the impacts of World War I, the MJFA decided at a meeting on 26 July to curtail the home-and-away season four weeks early. Prior to the final games held in round 14, some clubs had already struggled to find players as a result of enlistments.

Following the conclusion of the season, officials from the VFL sought to have the MAFA become a reserves competition to the VFL for the 1916 season. At least two clubs – Beverley and South Yarra – reported the MAFA that they had been "approached" about becoming reserves teams to Richmond and St Kilda respectively. The MAFA announced in late 1915 that they would not resume competition until the war had ended, while also stating that they were not prepared to be absorbed by the VFL. As of 30 July 1915, 164 MJFA players had been enlisted in the Australian Army.

In 1920, the MAFA announced that the re-formed competition would be between four of the "pre-war" clubs — namely, Collegians Football Club, South Yarra Amateur Football Club, Elsternwick Football Club, and Melbourne University Football Club (later University Blacks) — and four "new clubs" — namely, Old Melburnians, Old Caulfield Grammarians, Melbourne Swimming Club Football Club and the Teachers’ College Football Club.

By 1922, the association was divided into 2 sections of 8. Only four years later, three sections were established: Section A with 10 clubs and Section B and C with 8 clubs each.

=== VAFA and growth ===
In 1933, the MAFA changed its name to the Victorian Amateur Football Association (VAFA).

Competition was ceased for the Second World War (as it had after the Great War). Restarting in 1946 with 27 clubs in three sections, by 1947 34 clubs were competing over three sections. 1948 saw 35 clubs spread over four sections. In 1954 the MAFA established a fifth section for its 48 senior clubs.

1960 saw 74 clubs over 7 sections, but the association then dwindled and lost two sections. Section F was reintroduced in 1971. Section G was introduced in 1986. By 1987, there were 68 clubs over 8 sections.

Between 1995 until the end of the 1999 season, there was a geographic split in some VAFA divisions with "E South" (later "E White"), "E Central" (later "E Blue") and "E East" (later "F Section"). As well as an end to the geographic split, the 2000 season also saw the renaming of D Section, E Section, F Section and G Section to Division 1, Division 2, Division 3 and Division 4 respectively.

In 2010, A Section was renamed to Premier Division, B Section was renamed to Premier B and C Section was renamed to Premier C.

Starting in 2017, the VAFA has operated a women's competition in addition to the men's.

At the end of the 2023 season, Division 4 was abolished after Ivanhoe and Old Paradians were accepted into the Northern Football Netball League (NFNL).

== Inter-league and interstate games ==
=== 1925 ===
In June 1925 a MAFA Representative XVIII defeated the South Australian 21.22 to 8.10 at the MCG in the first amateur Interstate representative game.

=== 1948 ===
Players in the 1948 Perth Carnival included: R. B. Small, K. N. C. Rollanson, G. V. Byrne, C. P. Daley, J. C. Stock, V. G. Miller, E. Jane, W. J. Backhouse, W. T. Taggart, J. P. Sheehan, R. L. Rouse, K. F. Lewis, J. W. Grainier, W. Reynolds's, N. P. Airmen, G. W. McTaggart, D. B. White, (Deputy Manager) E. L. Macklin, B. F. Judd, V. W. Paxton, M. J. Davidson, D. W. Arnold, (Capt.) G. T. Moore, (Manager) M. K. Fitcher, (Vice-Capt.) A. H. C. Richard's, E. M. MacGregor.

=== 1951 ===
The Australian Amateur Jubilee Football Carnival was held in Melbourne in July 1951.

The Victorian team included: J. Kelly (Coach), K. Clarke, G. W. Gibbons, A. T. Shiel, D. Bills, J.D. Anderson, M.T. Hastie, A. D. Morning, G. Harris. G.T. Moore (Manager), A. E. Parley, W. B. Thomas, M. Mathewson, A. Ferguson, J. Stock, J. B. Jolley, J. Likely, B. F. Judd, W. M. Judd, P. McLaughlin, . Bedford, S. Bottles, D. W. Arnold (Capt.), P. M. Cox (V-Capt.), H. A. Meredith, A. F. Mellors, E. Donaldson.

=== 1954 ===
On 14 June 1954, the Queen's Birthday holiday, a Victorian representative team defeated a South Australian team 12.14 (86) to 10.15 (75) at the Junction Oval. The match was preceded by the Grand Final of a "lightning premiership" that involving sixteen teams playing knock-out matches of two 10 minute halves. Four of the first round matches were played at the Junction Oval, and the other four were played (simultaneously) at the Ross Gregory Oval at the other end of Albert Park Lake. The quarter final, semi final, and the Grand Final matches were all played at the Junction Oval. The sixteen teams involved were:

- Alphington Football Club, Hampton Rovers Football Club, Melbourne High School Old Boys (M.H.S.O.B.), Old Melburnians, and Ormond Amateur Football Club from A Section.
- Brunswick Amateurs Football Club, Caulfield Grammarians Football Club, Coburg Amateurs Football Club, Collegians Football Club, and Ivanhoe Amateur Football Club from B Section.
- Balwyn Football Club, East Malvern Football Club, and Parkside Football Club from C Section.
- Parkdale Football Club from D Section.
- South Melbourne City Football Club, and Preston Amateurs Football Club from E Section.

Parkside (the team that would later go on to have its twenty-ninth consecutive win in the 1954 C Section Grand Final), having beaten Balwyn in the first round, Preston in the quarter finals, and Ivanhoe in the Semi-finals, defeated Alphington in the Grand Final to win the lightning premiership.

=== 1956 ===
In 1956 a VAFA XVIII beat the combined VFL/VFA Amateurs in a demonstration game at the Olympic Games in Melbourne, 12.9 (81) to 8.7 (55).

=== 1957 ===
Of some considerable historical significance, the VAFA vs. South Australian Amateur Football League interstate match, played at Olympic Park on 17 June 1957 — which Victoria won 15.9 (99) to 8.3 (51) — was the first ever uninterrupted telecast of a complete Australian rules football game (viz., it was a direct broadcast of the entire four quarters of the match, rather than just the last quarter) .

=== 1971 ===
In 1971 a VAFA Representative side beat a VFA XVIII for the inaugural Victorian Football Cup 23.12 to 19.17.

== Men's clubs ==
=== Premier ===
| Club | Colours | Nickname | Home Ground | Former League(s) | Est. | First season | VAFA senior premierships | |
| Club | Colours | Nickname | Home Ground | Former League(s) | Est. | First season | Total | Most recent |
|---|---|---|---|---|---|---|---|---|
| Caulfield Grammarians | | Fields | Glenhuntly Oval, Caulfield East | – | 1920 | 1920 | 10 | 2019 |
| Old Brighton | | Tonners | Brighton Beach Oval, Brighton | – | 1957 | 1957 | 6 | 2025 |
| Old Haileybury | | Bloods | Princes Park, Caulfield South | – | 1961 | 1961 | 10 | 2024 |
| Old Scotch | | Cardinals | Camberwell Sports Ground, Camberwell | – | 1921 | 1921 | 13 | 2024 |
| Old Trinity | | T's | Daley Oval, Bulleen | – | 1923 | 1954 | 8 | 2025 |
| Old Xaverians | | Old Xavs | Toorak Park, Armadale | – | 1923 | 1923 | 20 | 2016 |
| St Bernard's | | Snowdogs | St Bernard's College Oval, Essendon West | – | 1963 | 1963 | 10 | 2023 |
| St Kevin's Old Boys | | SKOB | TH King Oval, Kooyong | – | 1947 | 1947 | 7 | 2022 |
| University Blacks | | Blacks | University Oval, Parkville | VJFL | 1919 | 1920 | 21 | 2014 |
| University Blues | | Blues | University Oval, Parkville | VJFL | 1919 | 1921 | 10 | 2026 |

=== Premier B ===
| Club | Colours | Nickname | Home Ground | Former League(s) | Est. | First season | VAFA senior premierships | |
| Club | Colours | Nickname | Home Ground | Former League(s) | Est. | First season | Total | Most recent |
|---|---|---|---|---|---|---|---|---|
| AJAX | | Jackas | Gary Smorgon Oval, St Kilda | – | 1957 | 1957 | 6 | 2011 |
| Beaumaris | | Sharks | Banksia Reserve, Beaumaris | SFNL | 1962 | 1995 | 6 | 2025 |
| Collegians | | Lions | Harry Trott Oval, Albert Park | – | 1892 | 1892 | 22 | 2026 |
| De La Salle | | DLSOC | Waverley Park, Malvern East | – | 1955 | 1955 | 11 | 2003 |
| Old Camberwell | | Wellers | Gordon Barnard Reserve, Balwyn North | – | 1960 | 1960 | 6 | 2007 |
| Old Carey Grammarians | | Panthers | Carey Sports Complex, Bulleen | – | 1954 | 1954 | 5 | 2024 |
| Old Geelong | | OGs | Como Park, South Yarra | – | 1954 | 1954 | 6 | 2016 |
| Old Ivanhoe Grammarians | | Hoers | Chelsworth Park, Ivanhoe | – | 1929 | 1964 | 8 | 2023 |
| Old Melburnians | | Redlegs | Elsternwick Park, Brighton | – | 1920 | 1920 | 15 | 2009 |
| Williamstown CYMS | | CYs | Fearon Reserve, Williamstown | WSFL | 1886 | 1983 | 5 | 2019 |

=== Premier C ===
| Club | Colours | Nickname | Home Ground | Former League(s) | Est. | First season | VAFA senior premierships | |
| Club | Colours | Nickname | Home Ground | Former League(s) | Est. | First season | Total | Most recent |
|---|---|---|---|---|---|---|---|---|
| Fitzroy | | Roy Boys | Brunswick Street Oval, Fitzroy | AFL | 1883 | 2009 | 1 | 2018 |
| Glen Eira/Old McKinnon (Glen Eira 1999-2024) | | Gryphons | Packer Park, Carnegie | – | 1999 | 1999 | 3 | 2023 |
| Hampton Rovers | | Rovers | Boss James Reserve, Hampton | NMFL | 1933 | 1933 | 9 | 2014 |
| Marcellin Old Collegians | | Eagles | Bray Oval, Marcellin College, Bulleen | YCWFL | 1968 | 1971 | 9 | 2008 |
| Mazenod Old Collegians | | Nodders | Central Reserve, Glen Waverley | ESCFA | 1978 | 1989 | 5 | 2016 |
| Old Peninsula | | Pirates | Harry MacDonald Oval, Mount Eliza | – | 1980 | 1980 | 1 | 2025 |
| Ormond | | Monders | EE Gunn Reserve, Ormond | – | 1932 | 1932 | 14 | 2018 |
| Parkdale Vultures | | Vultures | Gerry Green Reserve, Parkdale | – | 1991 | 1991 | 3 | 2026 |
| PEGS (Old Essendon Grammarians 1970-2011) | | Bombers | PEGS Sporting Fields, Keilor East | WRFL | 1970 | 1970, 1984 | 4 | 2022 |
| St Bedes/Mentone Tigers | | Tigers | Mentone Reserve, Mentone | – | 1992 | 1993 | 4 | 2008 |

=== Division 1 ===
| Club | Colours | Nickname | Home Ground | Former League(s) | Est. | First season | VAFA senior premierships | |
| Club | Colours | Nickname | Home Ground | Former League(s) | Est. | First season | Total | Most recent |
|---|---|---|---|---|---|---|---|---|
| Kew | | Bears | Victoria Park, Kew | VFLSD | 1876 | 2006 | 9 | 2015 |
| Monash Blues | | Blues | Frearson Oval, Clayton | – | 1962 | 1962 | 5 | 2022 |
| Oakleigh | | Krushers | WA Scammell Reserve, Oakleigh | – | 1991 | 1991 | 5 | 2007 |
| Old Yarra Cobras | | Cobras | Koonung Park, Bulleen | – | 2022 | 2023 | 0 | − |
| Parkside | | Devils | Pitcher Park, Alphington | NFNL | 1938 | 2015 | 6 | 2023 |
| Prahran (Prahran Assumption 2011-22) | | Two Blues | Toorak Park, Toorak | VFA | 1886 | 1999 | 3 | 2024 |
| Preston Bullants (Northern Blues 2012-16) | | Bullants | WR Ruthven VC Reserve, Preston | – | 2009 | 2009 | 3 | 2026 |
| St Mary's Salesian | | Saints | Ferndale Park, Glen Iris | – | 2008 | 2008 | 1 | 2025 |
| UHS-VU (University High School OB 1932-2001) | | Vultures | Brens Oval, Parkville | – | 1932 | 1933 | 6 | 2018 |

=== Division 2 ===
| Club | Colours | Nickname | Home Ground | Former League(s) | Est. | First season | VAFA senior premierships | |
| Club | Colours | Nickname | Home Ground | Former League(s) | Est. | First season | Total | Most recent |
|---|---|---|---|---|---|---|---|---|
| Aquinas Old Collegians | | Bloods | Aquinas College, Ringwood | ESCFA | 1981 | 1987 | 4 | 2019 |
| Brunswick (North Old Boys 1963-2015) | | NOBS | Gillon Oval, Brunswick | – | 1963 | 1963 | 3 | 2012 |
| Canterbury | | Cobras | Canterbury Sports Ground, Surrey Hills | EFNL | 1881 | 2014 | 2 | 2024 |
| Elsternwick | | Wickers | Elsternwick Park, Brighton | FFA | 1914 | 1947 | 8 | 2024 |
| MHSOB | | Unicorns | Woodfull-Miller Oval, South Yarra | – | 1928 | 1928 | 10 | 2009 |
| North Brunswick | | Bulls | Allard Park, Brunswick | NMFL | 1970 | 1971 | 4 | 2023 |
| Power House | | Slushies | Ross Gregory Oval, St Kilda | – | 1940 | 1940 | 7 | 2026 |
| South Melbourne Districts | | Bloods | Lindsay Hassett Oval, Albert Park | SFNL | 1912 | 2000 | 4 | 2022 |
| Therry Penola (Glenroy Amateurs 1974-77, Therry Corpus Christi OB 1978-95) | | Lions | JP Fawkner Reserve, Oak Park | – | 1974 | 1974 | 4 | 2013 |
| West Brunswick | | Magpies | Ransford Oval, Parkville | EDFL | 1932 | 1932, 1959 | 10 | 2025 |
| Whitefriars Old Collegians | | Friars | Whitefriars College Oval, Donvale | – | 1986 | 1986 | 6 | 2022 |

=== Division 3 ===
| Club | Colours | Nickname | Home Ground | Former League(s) | Est. | First season | VAFA senior premierships | |
| Club | Colours | Nickname | Home Ground | Former League(s) | Est. | First season | Total | Most recent |
|---|---|---|---|---|---|---|---|---|
| Albert Park (ANZ Bank 1954-95, ANZ-Albert Park 1996-98) | | Falcons | Ian Johnson Oval, St Kilda | – | 1954 | 1954 | 0 | − |
| Box Hill North | | Demons | Elgar Park, Mont Albert North | SFNL | 1983 | 2002 | 0 | − |
| Hawthorn | | Hawks | Rathmines Road Reserve, Hawthorn East | SFNL | 1954 | 1954-1957, 1995 | 1 | 1998 |
| La Trobe University | | Trobers | Tony Sheehan Oval, Bundoora | PHFL | 1967 | 1970 | 7 | 2022 |
| Richmond Central | | Snakes | Kevin Bartlett Reserve, Richmond | – | 1987 | 1987 | 1 | 1994 |
| Wattle Park (Emmaus-St Leo's 1992-2023) | | Animals | Bennettswood Reserve, Burwood | ESCFL | 1971 | 1992 | 4 | 2026 |

=== Thirds only ===
| Club | Colours | Nickname | Home Ground | Former League(s) | Est. | First season | VAFA senior premierships | |
| Club | Colours | Nickname | Home Ground | Former League(s) | Est. | First season | Total | Most recent |
|---|---|---|---|---|---|---|---|---|
| Chadstone (Syndal-Tally Ho 1997-2008) | | Synners | Jordan Reserve, Chadstone | SFNL | 1983 | 1997 | 0 | − |
| Eley Park | | Sharks | Whitehorse Reserve, Box Hill | SFNL | 1992 | 1994 | 1 | 1999 |
| Masala Dandenong | | Tigers | Lois Twohig Reserve, Dandenong North | – | 2013 | 2013 | 0 | − |
| Swinburne University | | Razorbacks | St James Park, Hawthorn | – | 1996 | 1996 | 1 | 2003 |

== Women's clubs ==
=== Premier ===
| Club | Colours | Nickname | Home Ground | Former League(s) | Est. | First season | VAFA senior premierships | |
| Club | Colours | Nickname | Home Ground | Former League(s) | Est. | First season | Total | Most recent |
|---|---|---|---|---|---|---|---|---|
| Caulfield Grammarians | | Fields | Glenhuntly Oval, Caulfield East | – | 1920 | 1920 | 1 | 2019 |
| Fitzroy | | Roy Girls | Brunswick Street Oval, Fitzroy | VWFL | 1883 | 2009 | 0 | − |
| Kew | | Bears | Victoria Park, Kew | VWFL | 1900 | 1949 | 0 | − |
| Melbourne University | | Mugars | University Oval, Parkville | VWFL | 1996 | 2017 | 1 | 2018 |
| Old Geelong | | OGs | Como Park, South Yarra | – | 1954 | 1954 | 1 | 2024 |
| Old Scotch | | Stars | Camberwell Sports Ground, Camberwell | – | 1921 | 1921 | 5 | 2026 |
| Old Yarra Cobras | | Cobras | Doncaster Reserve, Doncaster East | – | 1993 | 1993 | 0 | − |
| St Kevin's | | Saints | TH King Oval, Kooyong | – | 1947 | 1947 | 3 | 2023 |
| West Brunswick | | Magpies | McAlister Oval, Parkville | – | 1932 | 1959 | 0 | − |
| Williamstown CYMS | | CYs | Fearon Reserve, Williamstown | – | 1886 | 1983 | 1 | 2023 |

=== Premier B ===
| Club | Colours | Nickname | Home Ground | Former League(s) | Est. | First season | VAFA senior premierships | |
| Club | Colours | Nickname | Home Ground | Former League(s) | Est. | First season | Total | Most recent |
|---|---|---|---|---|---|---|---|---|
| Beaumaris | | Sharks | Banksia Reserve, Beaumaris | – | 1962 | 1995 | 2 | 2026 |
| Coburg | | Lions | Barry Plant Park, Coburg | SEWF | 2021 | 2023 | 0 | − |
| Marcellin Old Collegians | | Eagles | Bray Oval, Marcellin College, Bulleen | – | 1971 | 1971 | 2 | 2023 |
| Old Brighton | | Tonners | Brighton Beach Oval, Brighton | – | 1957 | 1957 | 2 | 2025 |
| Old Melburnians | | Redlegs | Elsternwick Park, Brighton | – | 1920 | 1920 | 0 | − |
| Old Xaverians | | Old Xavs | Toorak Park, Armadale | – | 1923 | 1923 | 0 | − |
| Parkdale Vultures | | Vultures | Gerry Green Reserve, Parkdale | – | 1991 | 1991 | 1 | 2026 |
| Port Melbourne Chargers | | Chargers | JL Murphy Reserve, Port Melbourne | – | 2025 | 2025 | 0 | − |
| St Bede's Mentone | | Tigers | Mentone Reserve, Mentone | – | 1972 | 1972 | 1 | 2022 |
| Westbourne Grammarians | | Warriors | Westbourne School Ground, Truganina | – | 2014 | 2014−2022, 2024− | 2 | 2025* |

*won in a different division

=== Division 1 ===
| Club | Colours | Nickname | Home Ground | Former League(s) | Est. | First season | VAFA senior premierships | |
| Club | Colours | Nickname | Home Ground | Former League(s) | Est. | First season | Total | Most recent |
|---|---|---|---|---|---|---|---|---|
| Glen Eira/Old McKinnon | | Gryphons | Packer Park, Carnegie | – | 1999 | 1999 | 3 | 2025 |
| Hampton Rovers | | Rovers | Boss James Reserve, Hampton | – | 1933 | 1933 | 1 | 2022 |
| Hawthorn | | Hawks | Rathmines Road Reserve, Hawthorn East | – | 1954 | 1995 | 2 | 2018 |
| Monash Blues | | Blues | Frearson Oval, Clayton | – | 1962 | 1962 | 1 | 2023 |
| Oakleigh | | Krushers | W.A. Scammell Reserve, Oakleigh | – | 1991 | 1991 | 0 | − |
| Old Haileybury | | Hearts | Princes Park, Caulfield South | – | 1925 | 1961 | 1 | 2018 |
| Power House | | Slushies | Ross Gregory Oval, St Kilda | – | 1940 | 1940 | 1 | 2026 |
| Richmond Central | | Snakes | Kevin Bartlett Reserve, Richmond | – | 1987 | 1987 | 1 | 2026 |
| Therry Penola | | Lions | JP Fawkner Reserve, Oak Park | – | 1977 | 1977 | 2 | 2024 |
| Whitefriars | | Friars | Whitefriars College Oval, Donvale | – | 1986 | 1986 | 1 | 2018 |

=== Division 2 ===
| Club | Colours | Nickname | Home Ground | Former League(s) | Est. | First season | VAFA senior premierships | |
| Club | Colours | Nickname | Home Ground | Former League(s) | Est. | First season | Total | Most recent |
|---|---|---|---|---|---|---|---|---|
| Aquinas | | Bloods | Aquinas College, Ringwood | – | 1981 | 1987 | 1 | 2026 |
| Box Hill North | | Demons | Elgar Park, Box Hill North | – | 1983 | 2002 | 0 | − |
| Brunswick | | Renegades | Gillon Oval, Brunswick | VWFL | 1963 | 1963 | 0 | − |
| De La Salle Old Collegians | | DLSOC | Waverley Park, Malvern East | – | 1955 | 1955 | 0 | − |
| La Trobe University | | Trobers | Tony Sheehan Oval, Bundoora | VWFL | 1967 | 1970 | 1 | 2025 |
| MCC | | Demons | Beaumaris Secondary College, Beaumaris | – | 2018 | 2018 | 1 | 2023 |
| Old Carey | | Panthers | Carey Sports Complex, Bulleen | – | 1954 | 1954 | 0 | − |
| Parkside | | Devils | Pitcher Park, Alphington | – | 1938 | 2015 | 0 | − |
| UHS-VU | | Vultures | Brens Oval, Parkville | – | 1932 | 1933 | 1 | 2023 |
| Wattle Park | | Animals | Bennettswood Reserve, Burwood | – | 1971 | 1992 | 0 | − |

=== Division 3 ===
| Club | Colours | Nickname | Home Ground | Former League(s) | Est. | First season | VAFA senior premierships | |
| Club | Colours | Nickname | Home Ground | Former League(s) | Est. | First season | Total | Most recent |
|---|---|---|---|---|---|---|---|---|
| Albert Park | | Falcons | Ian Johnson Oval, St Kilda | – | 1954 | 1954 | 0 | − |
| Canterbury | | Cobras | Canterbury Sports Ground, Surrey Hills | – | 1881 | 2014 | 0 | − |
| Elsternwick | | Wickers | Holmes-Todd Oval, Elsternwick | – | 1914 | 1947 | 0 | − |
| Mazenod | | Nodders | Central Reserve, Glen Waverley | – | 1978 | 1989 | 1 | 2017 |
| North Brunswick | | Bulls | Allard Park, Brunswick | – | 1970 | 1971 | 0 | − |
| Old Camberwell | | Wellers | Gordon Barnard Reserve, Balwyn North | – | 1960 | 1960 | 1 | 2017 |
| Ormond | | Monders | EE Gunn Reserve, Ormond | – | 1932 | 1932 | 1 | 2026 |
| Prahran | | Two Blues | Toorak Park, Toorak | VFA | 1886 | 2011 | 3 | 2024 |
| South Melbourne Districts | | Bloods | Lindsay Hassett Oval, Albert Park | – | 1912 | 2000 | 0 | − |
| St Mary's Salesian | | Saints | Ferndale Park, Glen Iris | – | 2008 | 2008 | 3 | 2025 |

=== Division 4 ===
| Club | Colours | Nickname | Home Ground | Former League(s) | Est. | First season | VAFA senior premierships | |
| Club | Colours | Nickname | Home Ground | Former League(s) | Est. | First season | Total | Most recent |
|---|---|---|---|---|---|---|---|---|
| Beaumaris 2 | | Sharks | Banksia Reserve, Beaumaris | – | 1962 | 1995 | 1 | 2022 |
| Fitzroy 3 | | Roy Girls | Brunswick Street Oval, Fitzroy | VWFL | 1883 | 2009 | 0 | − |
| Monash Blues 2 | | Blues | Frearson Oval, Clayton | – | 1962 | 1962 | 1 | 2023 |
| Oakleigh 2 | | Krushers | W.A. Scammell Reserve, Oakleigh | – | 1991 | 1991 | 0 | − |
| Port Melbourne Chargers 2 | | Chargers | JL Murphy Reserve, Port Melbourne | – | 2025 | 2025 | 0 | − |
| Preston | | Bullants | WR Ruthven VC Reserve, Preston | – | 2009 | 2009 | 1 | 2019 |
| St Kevin's 3 | | Saints | T H King Reserve, Kooyong | – | 1947 | 1947 | 4 | 2024 |
| West Brunswick 3 | | Magpies | McAlister Oval, Parkville | – | 1932 | 1959 | 0 | − |
| Westbourne Grammarians 2 | | Warriors | Westbourne School Ground, Truganina | – | 2014 | 2014−2022, 2024− | 2 | 2025 |

=== Women's teams in recess ===
| Club | Colours | Nickname | Home Ground | Former League(s) | Est. | First season | VAFA senior premierships | | Fate |
| Club | Colours | Nickname | Home Ground | Former League(s) | Est. | First season | Total | Most recent | Fate |
|---|---|---|---|---|---|---|---|---|---|
| Collegians | | Lions | Harry Trott Oval, Albert Park | – | 1892 | 1892 | 0 | − | In recess since 2024 season |
| Old Trinity Grammarians | | T's | Daley Oval, Bulleen | – | 1923 | 1954 | 0 | − | In recess since 2024 season |

== Uniforms (Men's clubs) ==
| Albert Park | AJAX | Aquinas | Beaumaris | Box Hill North | Brunswick |
| Canterbury | Caulfield Gram. | Collegians | Chadstone | De La Salle | Eley Park |
| Elsternwick | Fitzroy | Glen Eira | Hampton | Hawthorn | Kew |
| La Trobe University | Marc. Old Col. | Masala Dandenong | Maze. Old Col. | MHSOB | Monash |
| North Brunswick | Oakleigh | Old Brighton | Old Camberwell | Old Carey | Old Geelong |
| Old Ivanhoe Gram. | Old Haileybury | Old Melburnians | Old Peninsula | Old Scotch | Old Trinity Gram. |
| Old Xaverians | Old Yarra | Ormond | Parkdale | Parkside | PEGS |
| Preston | Therry Penola | Power House | Prahran | Richmond Central | St Bedes/Mentone |
| St Bernard's | St John's OCS | St Kevin's Old Boys | St Mary's Salesian | South Melbourne | Swinburne Uni. |
| UHS-VU | University (Blacks) | University (Blues) | West Brunswick | Whitefriars Old Col. | Wattle Park |
Williamstown CYMS

=== Club locations ===
Colours indicate club's highest level of competition
Red = Premier A
Yellow = Premier B
Green = Premier C
Blue = Division 1
Light blue = Division 2
Brown = Division 3
Black = Thirds
Purple = Women only

== Former clubs ==
| Club | Colours | Nickname | Home ground | Former league | Est. | VAFA seasons | VAFA senior premierships | | Fate |
| Club | Colours | Nickname | Home ground | Former league | Est. | VAFA seasons | Total | Most recent | Fate |
|---|---|---|---|---|---|---|---|---|---|
| Albanvale | | Cobras | Robert Bruce Reserve, Deer Park | WRFL | 1978 | 1989–1991 | 0 | - | Returned to Footscray Districts FL in 1992 |
| Alphington | | | John Cain Memorial Park, Thornbury | – | 1900s | 1934–1983 | 5 | 1981 | Folded after 1983 season |
| AMP Society | | | Oval 10, Albert Park | – | 1963 | 1963–1981 | 2 | 1979 | Merged with North Caulfield YCW to form Balaclava in 1982 |
| Army Apprentices | | | | NFL | 1959 | 1966–1970 | 0 | - | Folded |
| Assumption Old Collegians | | | | – | 1950s | 1964–1977, 1982 | 1 | 1967 | Played merged with St Patrick's Ballarat OC as Combined Country Colleges from 1978-81. Folded in 1983 |
| Australian Postal Institute | | | | – | 1965 | 1965 | 0 | - | Folded |
| Balaclava | | Kangaroos | | – | 1982 | 1982–1990 | 2 | 1986 | Merged with St Anthony's Glen Huntly to form Glenhuntly in 1991 |
| Balwyn | (1948-?)(?-1955) | Tigers | Balwyn Park, Balwyn | ESFL | 1909 | 1946–1955 | 0 | - | Returned to Eastern Suburban FL in 1956 |
| Balwyn Combined | | Demons | Macleay Park, Balwyn North | ESCFA | 1951 | 1993–1995 | 0 | - | Moved to Eastern Districts FL in 1996 |
| Banyule | | Bears | R.J Brockwell Oval, Heidelberg | – | 1967 | 1979–2014 | 4 | 2010 | Moved to Northern FNL in 2015 |
| Bellfield | | Mud and Blood | Ford Park, Bellfield | – | 1940s | 1950–1965 | 0 | - | Moved to Eastern Suburban Churches FA in 1966 |
| Bentleigh | | Demons | Bentleigh Reserve, Bentleigh | SFNL | 1965 | 2000–2010 | 1 | 2009 | Returned to Southern FNL in 2011 |
| Bentleigh Districts | | Demons | Bentleigh Reserve, Bentleigh | FFL | 1919 | 1929–1937 | 1 | 1930 | Moved to Caulfield Oakleigh District FL in 1938 |
| Beverley | | | Richmond City Reserve, Richmond | | 1890 | 1898−1915 | 1 | 1912 | Folded due to WWI |
| Beverley Hills | | | Zerbes Reserve, Doncaster East | – | 1972 | 1972–1981 | 0 | - | Moved to Eastern Districts FL in 1982 |
| Black Rock | | Jets | Donald MacDonald Reserve, Black Rock | FFL | 1908 | 1922, 1927–1930 | 1 | 1928 | Returned to Federal FL in 1923 and 1931 |
| Bloods | | Bloods | Glen Huntly Park, Caulfield East | – | 1987 | 1987−1998 | 1 | 1987 | Absorbed by Old Brighton in 1996 |
| Boronia Park | | Bombers | Miller Park, Boronia | – | 1990 | 1990–1993 | 0 | - | Moved to Southern FNL in 1994 |
| Boroondara | | | East Melbourne Cricket Ground, East Melbourne | – | 1890 | 1897; 1903–1904 | 0 | - | Merged with Hawthorn in 1905 |
| Brighton | | | Brighton Beach Oval, Brighton | VJFA | 1881 | 1892–1907 | 1 | 1903 | Moved to VFA in 1908 |
| Brighton (St Andrews 1949-51) | | | | – | 1940s | 1949–1958 | 0 | - | Folded |
| Brighton TSOB | | | | – | | 1930–1940 | 0 | - | Folded |
| Brightonvale | | | | – | | 1926–1939 | 2 | 1928 | Folded |
| Brunswick | | Lions | Fleming Park, Brunswick East | WRFL | 1926 | 1926–1994, 1999–2003 | 6 | 1992 | Moved to Footscray Districts FL in 1995; merged with Broadmeadows Power to form Brunswick Power in 2003 |
| Brunswick Power | | Power | Fleming Park, Brunswick East | – | 2001 | 2002–2003 | 0 | - | Moved to Western Region FL in 2004 |
| Bulleen United | | Bulls | Koonung Park, Bulleen | – | 1970s | 1975–1995 | 2 | 1986 | Merged with Canterbury North Balwyn in 1996 to form Bulleen Cobras |
| Bulleen Templestowe | | Bullants | Ted Ajani Reserve, Templestowe Lower | – | 1975 | 1975–2024 | 6 | 2012 | Moved to Eastern FNL in 2025 |
| Burwood | | | | RDFA | 1904 | 1924, 1928–1936 | 0 | - | Folded after 1936 season |
| Camberwell | | Cobras | Camberwell Sports Ground, Camberwell | VFA | 1886 | 1992–1995 | 0 | - | Folded after 1995 season |
| Canterbury North Balwyn | | | Macleay Park, Balwyn North | ESCFA | 1977 | 1993–1995 | 0 | - | Merged with Bulleen United in 1996 to form Bulleen Cobras |
| Canterbury United Churches | | | | ESCFA | 1927 | 1931–1932 | 0 | - | Folded after 1932 season |
| Carlton District | | District | Princes Park, Carlton North | – | | 1909–1915 | 0 | - | Moved to VFL reserves after WWI |
| Carnegie | | | East Caulfield Reserve, Caulfield East | FFL | 1920s | 1935–1938 | 0 | - | Moved to Caulfield Oakleigh District FL in 1939 |
| Cassie | | | | – | 1960s | 1964–1965 | 0 | - | Folded after 1965 season |
| Caulfield (Caulfield-Malvern 1915) | | Fieldsmen | East Caulfield Reserve, Caulfield East | – | 1890s | 1894–1915 | 0 | - | Entered recess in 1916 due to WWI, re-formed in VFL Sub-Districts in 1926 |
| Caulfield Amateurs (Caulfield) | | | Caulfield Park, Caulfield | CODFL | 1946 | 1952–1953 | 0 | - | Returned to Caulfield Oakleigh District FL in 1954 |
| Caulfield City (Caulfield) | | | Caulfield Park, Caulfield North | – | 1924 | 1924–1925 | 0 | - | Moved to Caulfield Oakleigh District JFL in 1926 |
| Celtic | | | | – | | 1900−1902 | 0 | - | Folded during 1902 season |
| Chirnside Park | | Panthers | Kimberley Reserve, Chirnside Park | – | 1978 | 1990–1999 | 0 | - | Moved to Eastern FNL in 2000 |
| Clayton | | Saints | | – | 1978 | 1979–1989 | 0 | - | Absorbed by Waverley in 1990 |
| Coburg | | Swans | De Chene Reserve, Coburg | EDFL | 1920s | 1935–1940; 1942–1987 | 7 | 1981 | Folded after 1987 season |
| Collingwood District (Fitzroy District 1904-05) | | Districts | Victoria Park, Abbotsford | – | 1906 | 1904–1915 | 1 | 1915 | Moved to VFL reserves after WWI |
| Commercial Bank | | | | – | | 1959–1966 | 0 | - | Folded after 1966 season |
| Commonwealth Bank | | Cobras | | – | 1946 | 1947–1990 | 3 | 1969 | Merged with State Bank to form State Commonwealth Bank in 1991 |
| Coolaroo Rovers | | Rovers | Progress Reserve, Coolaroo | – | | 1980 | 0 | - | Moved to Panton Hill FL in 1982 |
| Combined Country Colleges | | | | – | 1978 | 1978–1981 | 0 | - | Folded after 1981 season |
| Dandenong KSP | | | | | 1918 | 1930–1933 | 0 | − | Folded before start of 1934 season |
| Dookie Longerenong OC | | | Oval 11, Albert Park | – | | 1970–1974 | 0 | - | Folded after 1974 season |
| Doveton (St John's OC 1980, Doveton SJOC 1981-89) | | Eagles | Power Reserve, Doveton | – | 1980 | 1981–1995 | 0 | - | Moved to Southern FNL in 1996 |
| Dragons | | Dragons | Keeley Park, Clayton South | SFNL | 2007 | 2013–2014 | 0 | - | Returned to Southern FNL in 2015 |
| East Caulfield | | | | – | | 1946–1953 | 0 | - | Folded after 1953 season |
| East Malvern | | | TH King Oval, Glen Iris | VFLSD | – | 1929–1964 | 2 | 1950 | Moved to South East Suburban FL in 1964 |
| Edlington | | | | – | 1880s | 1892 | 0 | - | Folded in 1892 |
| Elwood | | | | | | 1922-1923 | 0 | - | Folded |
| ES&A Bank | | | | – | 1932 | 1932–1935, 1952–1969 | 2 | 1934 | Merged with ANZ Bank in 1970 |
| ES&A−National Bank | | | | – | 1936 | 1936–1937 | 0 | - | Folded, both clubs re-formed separately in 1952 and 1954 respectively |
| Fairfield | | Bloods | Fairfield Park Oval, Fairfield | – | 1891 | 1936–1973 | 4 | 1969 | Moved to Eastern Suburban Churches FL in 1974 |
| Fawkner | | Fawks | Charles Mutton Reserve, Fawkner | – | 1973 | 1973–1995 | 6 | 1992 | Moved to Footscray Districts FL in 1996 |
| Fitzroy Juniors | | Maroons | Brunswick Street Oval, Fitzroy North | – | 1912 | 1912–1915 | 0 | - | Moved to VFL reserves after WWI |
| Fitzroy Reds (University Reds 1954-96) | (1955-96)(1997-2008) | Reds | Brunswick Street Oval, Fitzroy North | MFL | 1954 | 1955−1964; 1973−2008 | 3 | 2005 | Entered recess in 1965; re-formed in 1970 in Metropolitan FL. Merged with Fitzroy in 2008 |
| Fitzroy Wesleys | | | | | | 1894 | 0 | - | |
| Flinders Naval Base | | | | PFL | 1913 | 1927–1928 | 0 | - | Returned to Peninsula FL in 1929 |
| Footscray Districts | | | | – | 1880s | 1892 | 0 | - | Folded in 1892 |
| Footscray Tech Old Boys (FTSOB/FTCOB/FTIOB) | | Footscray IT | Institute Oval, Footscray | WRFL | 1920s | 1932−1992 | 4 | 1983 | Folded in 1992 |
| Geelong Amateurs | | Ammos, Pegasus | Queens Park, Highton | – | 1926 | 1926–1940, 1947–1982 | 6 | 1972 | Recess in 1946. Moved to Geelong & District FL in 1983 |
| Glen Huntly | | | | CODFL | 1900s | 1926–1973 | 0 | - | Folded after 1973 season |
| Glenhuntly | | Hunters, Kangaroos | | – | 1991 | 1991–1998 | 1 | 1994 | Merged with St Kilda South Caulfield in 1999 to form Glen Eira |
| GTV 9 | | Gunners | Bill Woodfull Oval, Albert Park | – | 1986 | 1986−1989 | 0 | - | Folded in 1989 |
| Hampton | | | Castlefield Reserve, Hampton | FFL | 1919 | 1923–1927 | 0 | - | Merged with Black Rock and Sandringham to form Sandringham in 1928 |
| Hawthorn | (1903-04)(1905-11)(1912-13) | Mayblooms | Glenferrie Oval, Hawthorn | – | 1902 | 1902−1913 | 0 | - | Moved to VFA in 1914 |
| Heatherton | | Tunners | Heatherton Recreation Reserve, Heatherton | CYMSFA | 1913 | 1975–1989 | 2 | 1985 | Moved to Eastern Suburban Churches FL in 1990 |
| Heidelberg West | | Hawks | Heidelberg Park, Heidelberg | – | 1936 | 1939–1940 | 0 | - | Moved to Diamond Valley FNL in 1941 |
| Holy Trinity | | | | | | 1892 | 0 | - | Folded |
| Huntingdale | | | | | | 1956 | 0 | - | 1957-58 unknown, played in Caulfield-Oakleigh District FL between 1959-61 |
| Insurance Companies' Social Clubs | | | | | | 1954–1958 | 0 | - | Folded |
| Ivanhoe (Ivanhoe Assumption 1999-2006) | | Hoers | Ivanhoe Park, Ivanhoe | – | 1910 | 1932-2023 | 7 | 2022 | Moved to Northern FNL in 2024 |
| Kew Juniors | | Districts | Victoria Park, Kew | ESJFA | 1922 | 1926 | 0 | - | Folded in 1938 |
| Kingsville | | Tigers | Yarraville Oval, Yarraville | – | 1920s | 1927–1935 | 0 | - | Moved to Footscray Districts FL in 1936 |
| Kontias | | Magpies | Caulfield Park, Caulfield | ESCFA | 1985 | 1989–1991 | 0 | - | Moved to South East Suburban FL in 1992 |
| Kooyong | | | Righetti Oval, Glen Iris | – | 1963 | 1963–1965 | 0 | - | Moved to South East Suburban FL in 1966 |
| La Trobe University Reds | | Reds | Tony Sheehan Oval, Bundoora | PHFL | 1968 | 1971–1977 | 0 | - | Re-merged with La Trobe University Blacks in 1978 |
| Leopold | | Leos | Warehousemen's Cricket Ground, St Kilda | – | 1898 | 1898–1915 | 5 | 1913 | Moved to Victorian Junior FA in 1919 |
| Malvern (Gardiner 1932) | | | D.W. Lucas Oval, Malvern East | – | 1932 | 1896, 1932–1964 | 2 | 1937 | Merged with Tooronga to form Tooronga-Malvern in 1964 |
| Manningham Cobras (Bulleen Cobras 1996-2008) | (2000s)(2010s) | Cobras | Koonung Park, Bulleen | – | 1996 | 1996–2022 | 0 | - | Merged with Old Yarra Grammarians to form Old Yarra Cobras after 2022 season |
| Melbourne Shipping Companies | | | | | | 1922 | 0 | - | Folded |
| Melbourne Swimming Club | | | | | | 1920-1923 | 0 | - | Folded |
| Mentone (Old Mentonians 1968-2022) | (?-2022)(2024) | Panthers | Belvedere Park, Seaford | – | 1968 | 1968–2022, 2024 | 1 | 1990 | Entered recess in 2023, re-formed as Mentone in 2024, in recess since 2024 |
| Mentone (St Patricks Mentone 1991-2000) | | Vultures | Southern Road Reserve, Mentone | ESCFA | 1969 | 1991–2003 | 1 | 2001 | Merged with Parkdale in 2003 to form Parkdale Vultures |
| Monash Gryphons | | Gryphons | East Caulfield Reserve, Caulfield East | – | 1991 | 1991–2016 | 1 | 2010 | Merged with Glen Eira in 2016 to form Glen Eira Gryphons |
| Monash Whites | | Whites | Frearson Oval, Monash University, Clayton | – | 1964 | 1964–1965; 1971–2001 | 1 | 1975 | Merged with Monash Blues in 2001 |
| Moreland Amateurs | | | | | | 1949–1951 | 0 | - | Folded |
| Mt Carmel Old Collegians | | | | | | 1936–1940 | 0 | - | Folded |
| Mt Lilydale Old Collegians | | Rams | Mount Lilydale Mercy College Sporting Ovals, Lilydale | – | 1997 | 1997–2018 | 0 | - | Merged with Croydon North to form Croydon North MLOC and moved to Eastern FNL in 2019 |
| Murrumbeena | | | | FFL | 1915 | 1923–1962 | 3 | 1929 | Merged with Murrumbeena (CODFL) and Murrumbeena Rovers after 1962 season |
| Myer | | | | WRFL | 1917 | 1937–1954 | 1 | 1951 | Folded |
| National Bank | | | Oval 14, Albert Park | – | 1932 | 1932–1938, 1954–1979 | 3 | 1968 | Folded |
| Newlands Coburg | | Cobras | Jackson Reserve, Coburg North | WRFL | 1966 | 1994–1996 | 0 | - | Folded |
| North Alphington | | | | | | 1948–1952 | 1 | 1949 | Folded |
| Nunawading | | | | – | 1894 | 1894−1896 | 0 | - | De-merged into Mitcham, Box Hill and Surrey Hills after 1896 season |
| Oakleigh | | Oaks, Devils | Warrawee Park, Oakleigh | – | 1906 | 1908–1911, 1927–1928 | 0 | - | Moved to Melbourne District FA after 1911 season. Fielded reserves side in VAFA between 1927-28. |
| Oakleigh Clayton | | | | | 2003 | 2003–2006 | 0 | - | Merged U19s side of Oakleigh (VAFA) and Clayton (SFNL) |
| Old Eltham Collegians (Eltham 1986-?, Eltham Collegians ?-2011) | | Turtles | Eltham College Reserve, Research | – | 1986 | 1986–2019 | 1 | 1987 | Moved to Northern FNL in 2020 |
| Old Haileybury-Old Trinity | | | Old Scotch Oval, Melbourne | – | 1928 | 1928–1934 | 0 | - | Folded |
| Old Melburnians | | | | – | 1896 | 1896 | 0 | - | Folded in 1896 |
| Old Paradians | | Raiders | Garvey Oval, Bundoora | – | 1929 | 1929-2023 | 11 | 2015 | Moved to Northern FNL in 2024 |
| Olinda | | | | – | 1893 | 1893 | 0 | - | Folded |
| Parkdale | | Seagulls | Gerry Green Reserve, Parkdale | – | 1934 | 1934–1954 | 1 | 1936 | Moved to Federal FL in 1955 |
| Parkville | | | | – | | 1899 | 0 | - | Folded |
| Pascoe Vale | | Panthers | Raeburn Reserve, Pascoe Vale | VFLSD | 1909 | 1927–1928, 1940 | 0 | - | Returned to VFL Sub-Districts in 1941 |
| Patricians | | | | – | | 1965–1969 | 0 | - | Folded |
| Pharmacy College | | | | – | | 1962–1965 | 0 | - | Folded |
| Point Cook | | Bulldogs | Saltwater Reserve, Point Cook | – | 2010 | 2010–2017 | 0 | - | Moved to Western Region FL in 2018 |
| Port Colts | | | | – | | 1987−1989 | 0 | - | Folded |
| Port Melbourne | | | | – | | 1956–1959 | 2 | 1958 | Folded |
| Port Rovers | | Rovers | | – | | 1903–1908 | 1 | 1905 | Folded |
| Prahran-Caulfield | | | | – | 2007 | 2007 | 0 | - | Merged U19 side of Prahran (VAFA) and Caulfield Bears (SFNL) |
| Preston | | | | | | 1954–1969 | 1 | 1959 | Folded |
| Preston Marist Brothers Old Boys | | Bullants | | | | 1983–1993 | 1 | 1988 | Folded |
| Princes Hill | | | McAlister Oval, Parkville | | | 1979–1981 | 0 | - | Folded |
| RAAF Cadets | | | Fawkner Park, South Yarra | SESFL | | 1964–1965 | 0 | - | Returned to South East Suburban FL in 1966 |
| Reservoir Old Boys | | | C T Barling Reserve, Reservoir | – | 1965 | 1965–1977 | 2 | 1973 | Folded |
| RMIT University | | Redbacks | RMIT Oval, Bundoora | – | 2019 | 2019–2021 | 0 | – | Withdrew shortly before start of 2022 season |
| Rupertswood | | Sharks | Rupertswood Reserve, Sunbury | – | 1999 | 2000–2012 | 2 | 2009 | Moved to Riddell District FNL in 2013 |
| Salesian OC | | | Salesian College, Chadstone | ESCFA | 1970s | 1989–2007 | 1 | 1996 | Merged with St Mary's to form St Mary's Salesian in 2008 |
| Sandringham | | | | FFL | | 1921-1928 | 1 | 1923 | Merged with Hampton and Black Rock to form Sandringham in 1929 |
| Sandringham B | | | | | | 1928 | 0 | - | Merged with Hampton and Black Rock to form Sandringham in 1929 |
| Sandringham Amateurs | | | Beach Road Oval, Sandringham | | | 1940 | 0 | - | |
| Sandringham Juniors | | | | | | 1926–1927 | 0 | - | |
| Scotch Collegians | | | | – | 1890s | 1894-1995 | 0 | - | Folded |
| South Camberwell | | | Howard Dawson Reserve, Glen Iris | ESFL | | 1937–1940 | 0 | - | Moved to Eastern Suburban Churches FA after WWII |
| South Caulfield | | | Princes Park, Caulfield South | – | 1920s | 1926–1940 | 0 | - | Joined CYMSFA as South Caulfield CYMS after WWII |
| South Melbourne City | | | | | | 1954–1959 | 2 | 1955 | Folded |
| South Melbourne Juniors | | Southeners | | – | 1900 | 1900 | 0 | – | Moved to VJFA |
| South Mornington | | Tigers | Citation Reserve, Mount Martha | SFNL | 2006 | 2007–2019 | 1 | 2012 | Returned to Southern FNL in 2020 |
| South St Kilda | | | Junction Oval, St Kilda | | c. 1870s | 1892-1899 | 4 | 1897 | Folded in 1899 |
| South Yarra | | | Cordner Oval, Fawkner Park, South Yarra | | | 1897−1898 | 0 | − | |
| South Yarra Juniors (South Yarra) | | | | | | 1901−1921 | 3 | 1914 | |
| Southbank (State Commonwealth Bank 1991, Commonwealth Bank 1992-93) | | Bankers, Cobras, Tigers | Swan St, Southbank | – | 1990 | 1990–1998 | 1 | 1997 | Merged with Prahran in 1998 |
| St Andrews-Coburg | | Saints | De Chene Reserve, Coburg | EDFL | 1980 | 1986–1994 | 0 | - | Moved to Diamond Valley FL in 1995 |
| St Bede's Old Collegians | | Bedas | Beda Park, Mordialloc | SFNL | 1966 | 1972–1992 | 1 | 1977 | Merged with Mentone in 1992 to form St Bede's/Mentone Tigers |
| St Columb's | | | | | | 1953 | 0 | - | Folded |
| St Francis Xavier | | | | | 1880s | 1899 | 0 | - | Folded in 1899 |
| St Francis Xavier OC | (2007-?)(?-2019) | Saints, X-Men | St Francis Xavier College; Senior Campus, Beaconsfield | – | 2007 | 2007–2019 | 1 | 2019 | Moved to Southern FNL as Narre South Saints in 2020 |
| St Ignatius | | | Richmond City Reserve, Richmond | | | 1900−1902, 1932–1934 | 0 | - | Folded |
| St John's Old Collegians | | JOCS | Thomas Carroll Reserve, Dandenong | – | 1991 | 1991-2025 | 2 | 2011 | Moved to Southern FNL following 2025 season |
| St Jude's | | | | | | 1892-1893 | 0 | - | Folded |
| St Kilda CBC Old Boys | | Saints | Coughlin Oval, St Kilda East | – | 1958 | 1958–1991 | 5 | 1984 | Merged with Murrumbeena-South Caulfield to form St Kilda-South Caulfield in 1992 |
| St Kilda-South Caulfield | | Saints | Packer Park, Carnegie | – | 1992 | 1992–1998 | 1 | 1994 | Merged with Glen Huntly to form Glen Eira in 1999 |
| St Leonard's | | | | | | 1986–1989 | 0 | - | Folded |
| St Mary's | | Saints | Ferndale Park, Glen Iris | ESCFA | 1932 | 1990–2007 | 2 | 1993 | Merged with Salesian OC to form St Mary's Salesian in 2008 |
| St Mary's | | | | | | 1892−1898 | 0 | - | Folded |
| St Patrick's Ballarat OC | | | | – | 1939 | 1939–1940, 1951–1955, 1964–1975 | 3 | 1971 | Folded |
| St Patrick's Monivae | | | | – | 1976 | 1976 | 0 | - | Folded |
| St Paul's (Ascot Vale) | | | | | | 1926–1940 | 0 | - | Folded |
| St Peter's Clayton | | Saints | Namatjira Park, Clayton South | ESCFA | 1956 | 1991–1992 | 0 | - | Folded after 1992 season |
| St Pius' | | | Ford Park, Bellfield | YCWFL | | 1979–1982 | 1 | 1979 | Folded |
| State Bank (State Savings Bank 1927-76) | | Bankers | Oval 4, Albert Park | – | 1927 | 1927–1990 | 5 | 1990 | Merged with Commonwealth Bank in 1990 to form State Commonwealth Bank |
| State Electricity Commission | | | | ESFL | | 1947 | 0 | - | Folded after 1947 season |
| Surrey Hills | | | Surrey Park, Box Hill | RDFA | 1887 | 1928–1932 | 0 | - | Moved to Eastern Suburban FL in 1933 |
| Teachers College | | | | – | 1920 | 1920-1957 | 3 | 1954 | Folded |
| Thomastown | | Bears | Main Street Reserve, Thomastown | PHFL | 1966 | 1975–2000 | 2 | 1989 | Moved to Diamond Valley FL in 2001 |
| Thornbury | | Bears | John Cain Memorial Park, Thornbury | CYMSFA | 1930s | 1973–1983 | 1 | 1978 | Moved to Diamond Valley FL in 1984 |
| Thornbury Cougars | (1996-97)(1998-99) | Cougars | Hayes Park, Thornbury | MNFL | 1955 | 1996–1999 | 0 | - | Merged with Parkside to play as their Club XVIII side in 2000 |
| Toorak-Grovesnor | | | | | | 1892-1894 | 0 | - | Folded |
| Tooronga-Malvern | | Panthers | D.W. Lucas Oval, Malvern East | – | 1964 | 1964–1972 | 1 | 1971 | Moved to South East Suburban FL in 1973 |
| VUT (FIT/VUT 1993) | | | | – | 1993 | 1993−1996 | 0 | - | Folded in 1996 |
| Waltham | | | | | | 1895–1897 | 0 | - | Folded |
| Waverley Amateurs | | Panthers | Central Reserve, Glen Waverley | VFA | 1908 | 1989–1990 | 0 | - | Moved to Eastern Districts FL in 1991 |
| Werribee Districts (Werribee Amateurs 1998-2010) | | Tigers | Soldiers Reserve, Werribee | WRFL | 1995 | 1998–2013 | 2 | 2010 | Moved to Western Region FL in 2014 |
| West Brunswick | | | | | 1930 | 1932–1936 | 1 | 1932 | Folded |
| West Hawthorn | | | | ESPCFA | 1924 | 1927–1933 | 1 | 1931 | Folded |
| Windsor | | | | | | 1894−1898 | 0 | - | Folded |
| Wyndham Suns | | Suns | Goddard Street Reserve, Tarneit | – | 2013 | 2014 | 0 | - | U/19s only. Moved to Western Region FL in 2015 |
| Yarra Old Grammarians | | Bushrangers | Doncaster Reserve, Doncaster East | – | 1993 | 1993–2022 | 4 | 2012 | Merged with Manningham Cobras in 2022 to form Old Yarra Cobras |
| YMCA | | | | | | 1892-1893 | 0 | - | Folded |

=== Club movements ===
| Season | New clubs admitted | Clubs that left before start of next season |
|---|---|---|
| 1892 | Alberton | Edlington (2nd 20) |
| 1892 | Brighton (2nd 20) | Footscray District |
| 1892 | Collegians (2nd 20) | |
| 1892 | Edlington (2nd 20) | |
| 1892 | Footscray District | |
| 1892 | South St Kilda (2nd 20) | |
| 1892 | St Jude's | |
| 1892 | St Mary's | |
| 1892 | Toorak-Grosvenor | |
| 1892 | YMCA | |
| 1893 | Olinda | YMCA |
| 1893 | University 2nd | |
| 1894 | Nunawading | Olinda |
| 1894 | Scotch Collegians | University 2nd |
| 1894 | Windsor | Toorak-Grosvenor |
| 1894 | Caulfield | St Jude's |
| 1895 | Waltham | |
| 1896 | Old Melburnians | Alberton |
| 1896 | Malvern | Scotch Collegians |
| 1896 | | Old Melburnians |
| 1897 | South Yarra | Booroondara |
| 1897 | Booroondara | Waltham |
| 1898 | Leopold | St Mary's |
| 1898 | Beverley | South Yarra |
| 1899 | St Francis Xavier | St Francis Xavier |
| 1899 | Parkville | Parkville |
| 1899 | Kew | South St Kilda |
| 1900 | Celtic | |
| 1900 | St Ignatius | |
| 1900 | South Melbourne Juniors | |
| 1901 | South Yarra Juniors | South Melbourne Juniors |
| 1901 | | Kew |
| 1902 | Hawthorn | Celtic |
| 1902 | | St Ignatius |
| 1903 | Boroondara (readmitted) | |
| 1903 | Port Rovers | |
| 1904 | Fitzroy District | Booroondara |
| 1905 | Melbourne University | |
| 1908 | Oakleigh | Brighton |
| 1908 | University 2nd | University |
| 1908 | | Port Rovers |
| 1909 | Carlton District | |
| 1911 | | Oakleigh |
| 1912 | Fitzroy Juniors | |
| 1913 | | Hawthorn |
| 1914 | Elsternwick | |
| 1920 | Old Melburnians | |
| 1920 | Old Caulfield | |
| 1920 | Melbourne Swimming Club | |
| 1920 | Melbourne Teachers College | |
| 1920 | Collegians | |
| 1920 | Elsternwick | |
| 1920 | University B | |
| 1920 | South Yarra | |
| 1921 | Old Brighton | Teachers College (expelled) |
| 1921 | Old Scotch | South Yarra |
| 1921 | University A | |
| 1921 | Old Trinity | |
| 1921 | Sandringham | |
| 1921 | Hampton | |
| 1922 | Melbourne Shipping Company | Melbourne Shipping Company |
| 1922 | Murrumbeena | |
| 1922 | Elwood | |
| 1922 | Old Brighton | |
| 1922 | Teachers College (readmitted) | |
| 1923 | Old Xaverians | Elsternwick B |
| 1924 | Burwood | Elwood |
| 1924 | Caulfield City | |
| 1924 | Old Brighton | |
| 1925 | Old Hailebury | Caulfield (expelled) |
| 1926 | Geelong | |
| 1926 | Sandringham Juniors | |
| 1926 | St Paul's Ascot Vale | |
| 1926 | Old Melburnians B | |
| 1926 | Teachers College B | |
| 1926 | Kew Juniors | |
| 1926 | Brunswick | |
| 1926 | South Caulfield | |
| 1926 | Gardenvale-Middle Brighton | |
| 1927 | Glenhuntly B | Oakley Amateurs (expelled) |
| 1927 | West Hawthorn | |
| 1927 | Kingsville Rovers | |
| 1927 | Oakley Amateurs | |
| 1927 | Pascoe Vale | |
| 1927 | Black Rock | |
| 1927 | Naval Base Flinders | |
| 1927 | State Savings Bank | |
| 1928 | Burwood | Sandringham |
| 1928 | Sandringham B | Sandringham B |
| 1928 | Surrey Hills | Pascoe Vale (expelled) |
| 1928 | Oakley (readmitted) | Oakley (expelled) |
| 1929 | MHSOB | |
| 1929 | Old Ivanhoe | |
| 1929 | Old Paradians | |
| 1929 | Bentleigh | |
| 1930 | Dandenong KSP | Old Ivanhoe |
| 1930 | Brighton Technical OB | Black Rock (expelled) |
| 1930 | Glenhuntly B | |
| 1931 | Canterbury United Churches | |
| 1932 | University High School OB | |
| 1932 | North Melbourne CBC | |
| 1932 | Ormond | |
| 1932 | West Brunswick | |
| 1932 | Footscray TSOB | |
| 1932 | St Ignatius | |
| 1932 | Gardiner | |
| 1932 | ES&A Bank | |
| 1932 | Old Brighton | |
| 1932 | National Bank | |
| 1933 | Hampton Rovers | West Hawthorn |
| 1933 | | Canterbury United Churches |
| 1933 | | Surrey Hills |
| 1934 | Ivanhoe | Dandenong |
| 1934 | Parkdale | |
| 1934 | Alphington | |
| 1935 | Carnegie | St Ignatius (expelled) |
| 1935 | Coburg | Old Haileybury/Old Trinity |
| 1935 | | Kingsville |
| 1935 | | National Bank |
| 1936 | Fairfield | Burwood |
| 1936 | Mount Carmel OC | |
| 1936 | West Brunswick | |
| 1937 | Myer | Bentleigh District |
| 1937 | St Camberwell | |
| 1938 | Parkside Amateurs | |
| 1939 | St Patrick's Ballarat OC | National Bank |
| 1939 | Heidelberg West | Carnegie |
| 1939 | | North Melbourne CBC (expelled) |
| 1940 | Pascoe Vale | Geelong |
| 1940 | Power House | Brighton |
| 1940 | | Old Brighton |
| 1946 | Balwyn Amateurs | |
| 1946 | Carnegie Church of Christ | |
| 1947 | Elsternwick (readmitted) | |
| 1947 | Power House (readmitted) | |
| 1947 | Geelong (readmitted) | |
| 1947 | Commonwealth Bank | |
| 1947 | St Kevin's | |
| 1947 | State Electricity Commission | |
| 1948 | North Alphington | State Electricity Commission |
| 1948 | University High School OB (readmitted) | |
| 1949 | Glenhuntly Juniors | |
| 1949 | Moreland Amateurs | |
| 1949 | St Andrews | |
| 1950 | Bellfield | Glenhuntly Juniors |
| 1951 | St Patrick's Ballarat OC (readmitted) | |
| 1952 | DS&A Bank | Moreland |
| 1952 | | North Alphington |
| 1953 | St Columb's | |
| 1954 | ANZ Bank | Caulfield |
| 1954 | Insurance Social Clubs Association | |
| 1954 | National Bank | |
| 1954 | Old Carey | |
| 1954 | Old Geelong Grammarians | |
| 1954 | Old Trinity | |
| 1954 | Power House Gold | |
| 1954 | Preston | |
| 1954 | Sth Melbourne City | |
| 1954 | Hawthorn Amateurs | |
| 1955 | De La Salle OC | Myer |
| 1955 | Melburnian Blues | |
| 1955 | University E | |
| 1956 | Port Melbourne Amateurs | Balwyn |
| 1956 | | St Patrick's OC |
| 1957 | AJAX | Hawthorn Amateurs (expelled) |
| 1958 | Collegians Gold | Insurance Social Clubs Associations |
| 1958 | | St Kilda CBC OB |
| 1959 | Commercial Bank | Brighton |
| 1959 | West Brunswick | Huntingdale Juniors |
| 1959 | | South Melbourne City |
| 1960 | Old Camberwell | Port Melbourne Amateurs |
| 1962 | Monash University | |
| 1962 | Pharmacy College | |
| 1962 | North Melbourne CBC (readmitted) | Murrumbeena |
| 1962 | St Bernard's OC | |
| 1962 | Kooyong | |
| 1962 | AMP Society | |
| 1963 | | University Reds |
| 1964 | RAAF Cadets (Point Cook) | |
| 1964 | Old Ivanhoe Grammarians | |
| 1964 | Cassie | |
| 1964 | Monash University Whites | |
| 1964 | Assumption OB | |
| 1964 | St Patricks Ballarat (readmitted) | |
| 1965 | Australian Postal Institute | Pharmacy College (expelled) |
| 1965 | Reservoir OB | |
| 1965 | Patricians | |
| 1966 | | Bellfield |
| 1966 | | API |
| 1966 | | Monash University Whites |
| 1966 | | RAAF Cadets |
| 1966 | | Cassie |
| 1966 | | Kooyong (refused readmission) |
| 1968 | Old Mentonians | |
| 1970 | Old Essendon Grammarians | |
| 1970 | Dookie | |
| 1970 | Longernong OC | |
| 1970 | La Trobe University | |
| 1971 | Marcellin OC | |
| 1971 | North Brunswick | |
| 1971 | La Trobe University Reds | |
| 1971 | Monash University Whites (readmitted) | |
| 1972 | St Bedes OC | |
| 1973 | Fawkner | Fairfield (expelled for paying players) |
| 1973 | Thornbury | |
| 1973 | University Reds (readmitted) | |
| 1974 | Glenroy | |
| 1974 | Beverley Hills | |
| 1975 | Bulleen United | |
| 1975 | Heatherton | |
| 1975 | Bulleen Templestowe | |
| 1977 | | St Patricks Ballarat |
| 1978 | | Reservoir OB |
| 1979 | St Pius | National Bank |
| 1979 | Clayton | |
| 1979 | Princes Hill | |
| 1980 | St John's OC | |
| 1980 | Peninsula OB | |
| 1980 | Coolaroo Rovers | |
| 1980 | Thomastown | |
| 1980 | Banyule | |
| 1982 | | Geelong Amateurs |
| 1983 | Williamstown CMYS | Assumption OC |
| 1983 | | Alphington (suspended for 2 years) |
| 1984 | Preston MBOB | Thornbury |
| 1984 | | Old Essendon Grammarians (readmitted) |
| 1985 | GTV 9 | |
| 1985 | Eltham Collegians | |
| 1985 | St Andrews | |
| 1985 | St Leonards OC | |
| 1985 | Whitefriars OC (on probation) | |
| 1986 | Alphington (readmitted) | |
| 1987 | Aquinas | |
| 1987 | Bloods | |
| 1987 | Port Colts | |
| 1987 | Richmond Central | |
| 1988 | | Coburg |
| 1988 | | Clayton |
| 1989 | Mazenod OC | |
| 1989 | Salesian OC | |
| 1989 | Waverley Amateurs | |
| 1990 | Boronia Park | FIT |
| 1990 | St Mary's | Port Colts |
| 1990 | | State Bank |
| 1990 | | Commonwealth Bank |
| 1991 | St John's OC | Waverley Amateurs |
| 1991 | St Patricks-Menton | St Kilda CB OC |
| 1991 | Old Westbourne Grammarians | |
| 1991 | Monash Gryphons | |
| 1991 | State Commonwealth Bank | |
| 1992 | St Kilda South Caulfield | Albanvale |
| 1992 | St Leo's-Wattle Park | Kontias (withdrew round 3, record expunged) |
| 1992 | Camberwell | |
| 1993 | Yarra Valley Old Boys | |
| 1994 | Eley Park | Boronia Park |
| 1994 | Newlands Coburg | Brunswick |
| 1994 | Camberwell | |
| 1995 | Beaumaris | Fawkner |
| 1995 | Hawthorn Citizens | Doveton |
| 1995 | Swinburne University | St Andrew's-Coburg |
| 1995 | Eltham OC | |
| 1995 | Ivanhoe | |
| 1995 | Kew | |
| 1996 | Thornbury Cougars | Balwyn Combined |
| 1996 | | Bulleen United |
| 1996 | | Canterbury North Balwyn |
| 1996 | | Bloods |
| 1997 | Mt Lilydale | Newlands Coburg |
| 1997 | Syndal Tally-Ho | |
| 1997 | Bulleen Cobras | |
| 1998 | Werribee Amateurs | |
| 1999 | Brunswick (readmitted) | Glenhuntly |
| 1999 | | St Kilda South Caulfield |
| 2000 | Bentleigh | Monash Whites |
| 2000 | South Melbourne Districts | Chirnside Park |
| 2000 | Glen Eira | Chirnside Park |
| 2001 | | Thomastown |
| 2002 | Box Hill North | Eley Park |
| 2002 | Brunswick Power | Parkside |
| 2003 | Balwyn Combined | Preston MBOB |
| 2003 | Canterbury North Balwyn | St Bedes OC |
| 2003 | Yarra Valley OB | Mentone |
| 2004 | St Bede's Mentone Tigers | Mentone Vultures |
| 2004 | St Bede's Mentone Tigers | Brunswick Power |
| 2005 | Parkdale Vultures | Mt Lilydale |
| 2007 | South Mornington | |
| 2008 | St Francis Xavier | St Mary's Amateurs |
| 2008 | St Francis Xavier | Salesian OC AFC |
| 2008 | St Francis Xavier | Fitzroy Reds |
| 2009 | Fitzroy | |
| 2009 | St Mary's Salesian | |
| 2009 | Northern Bullants | |
| 2010 | Point Cook | |
| 2012 | Masala | Rupertswood |
| 2014 | Parkside | Banyule |
| 2017 | | Point Cook |
| 2018 | | Old Eltham Collegians |
| 2019 | | South Mornington |
| 2019 | | St Francis Xavier |
| 2022 | | Manningham Cobras |
| 2022 | | Yarra Old Grammarians |
| 2023 | Old Yarra Cobras | Ivanhoe |
| 2023 | Old Yarra Cobras | Old Paradians |
| 2024 | | Bulleen Templestowe |
| 2025 | Port Melbourne Chargers | St John's Old Collegians |

== Venues ==
Dozens of venues are used for VAFA matches across all grades and divisions throughout the home-and-away season and finals series.

== Records ==
| Record | Total | Division/Grade | Game |
|---|---|---|---|
| Highest score | 65.35 (425) | Junior Section 1 | Melbourne University vs Kew (1983) |
| Lowest score | 0.0 (0) | —N/a | Recorded innumerable times |
| Most goals in a game | 30 | A Section Men's | William Pearson (Old Scotch) vs Brunswick (1934) |

== See also ==
- Australian rules football in Victoria
