= 1892 MJFA season =

1st season of the Metropolitan Junior Football Association

- Teams: 10
- Premiers: Collegians; 1st premiership
- Minor premiers: Collegians; 1st minor premiership

The 1892 MJFA season was the inaugural season of the Metropolitan Junior Football Association (MJFA).

Collegians Football Club won the inaugural premiership, after finishing first on the ladder with 15 wins from its 18 games.

As of 2025, Collegians is the only club from the first MJFA season to still exist and compete in the competition (which was renamed to the Victorian Amateur Football Association in 1933).

== Association membership ==
Ten clubs competed in the inaugural MJFA season − Alberton, Brighton, Collegians, Edlington, Footscray District, South St Kilda, St Jude's, St Mary's, Toorak-Grosvenor and YMCA.

Brighton, Collegians, Edlington and South St Kilda were "2nd 20" (reserves) teams in the 1892 season. Their senior teams all competed in the Victorian Junior Football Association (VJFA), although Collegians' senior team appears to have been in local schoolboy competitions.

=== Edlington withdrawal ===
Edlington left the MJFA after just two games, having kicked just one goal to 13 goals against, and their remaining games were considered walkovers. Because the withdrawal created an uneven number of teams, extra games were played against the Holy Trinity Football Club by teams that were initially scheduled to play Edlington.

== Ladder ==
Holy Trinity was not included in the ladder at the end of the season published in The Australasian.

Pos	Team	Pld	W	L	D	GF	GA	Pts
1	Collegians (P)	18	15	2	1	111	56	62
2	Alberton	18	14	2	2	107	64	60
3	St Jude's	18	13	1	4	81	37	60
4	South St Kilda	18	11	5	2	59	49	48
5	Footscray District	18	8	6	4	54	49	40
6	Toorak-Grosvenor	18	8	9	1	56	49	36
7	St Mary's	18	6	11	1	37	60	26
8	Brighton	18	4	13	1	38	81	18
9	YMCA	18	3	15	0	34	95	12
−	Holy Trinity							
−	Edlington (W)	2	0	2	0	1	13	0

(P) Premiers; (W) Club withdrew
