= Boroondara Football Club =

Names
- Full name: Boroondara Football Club
- Former name: Star of Camberwell Football Club (1890−1891)
- Former nickname: Star

Club details
- Founded: 1890; 136 years ago
- Dissolved: 30 March 1905; 120 years ago

Uniforms
Home

The Boroondara Football Club was an Australian rules football club that competed in the Metropolitan Junior Football Association (MJFA) until it merged with the Hawthorn Football Club in 1905.

== History ==
Boroondara was formed as the Star of Camberwell Football Club around 1890. The club changed its name to Boroondara on 24 June 1891.

In 1897, the club joined the Metropolitan Junior Football Association (MJFA) after absorbing Camberwell Juniors. Arthur Leach and Fred Leach both played for Boroondara and were among the club's strongest players until moving to the Victorian Football League (VFL), joining Essendon and Collingwood respectively. The club withdrew from the MJFA late in the season and likely went into recess.

Boroondara returned to the MJFA for the 1903 season and remained in the competition in 1904.

Following the end of the 1904 season, Booroondara merged with fellow MJFA club Hawthorn at the competition's annual meeting on 30 March 1905. Hawthorn retained its own name, but adopted Boroondara's colours of a black guernsey with a red sash.
