= South St Kilda Football Club =

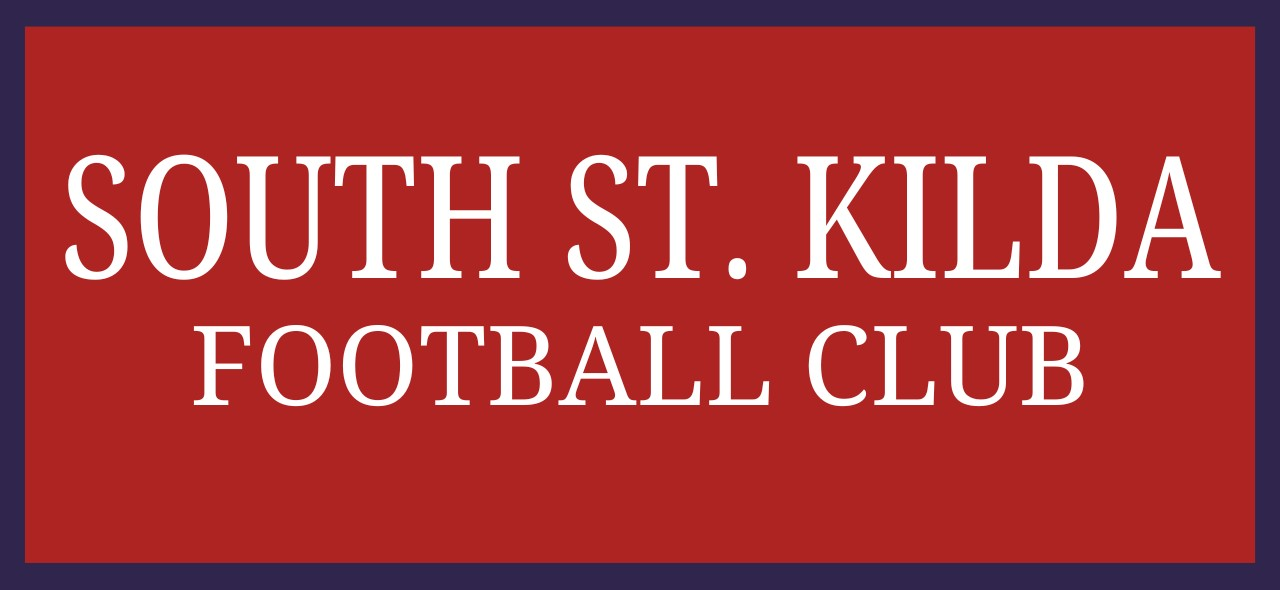

Names
- Full name: South St Kilda Football Club

Club details
- Founded: c. 1870s; 155 years ago
- Dissolved: July 1899; 126 years ago
- Premierships: MJFA (4): 1893; 1894; 1895; 1897
- Ground: St Kilda Cricket Ground

Uniforms
Home

The South St Kilda Football Club was an Australian rules football club based in the Melbourne suburb of St Kilda. The club was a founding member of the Metropolitan Junior Football Association (MJFA, now VAFA) and was one of the competition's most successful clubs in its early years.

== History ==
South St Kilda appears to have been formed prior to the establishment of the Victorian Football Association (VFA) in May 1877. The club participated in the first year of the Victorian Junior Football Association (VJFA) in 1883. It also appears to have later joined the Suburban Junior Football Association (SJFA).

In 1892, the club was a founding member of the MJFA, entering a "2nd 20" (reserves) team in the competition's inaugural season.

The club won its first MJFA premiership in 1893, having finished first on the ladder at the end of the season. They went onto win a three peat with further premierships in 1894 and 1895, and a fourth premiership was won in 1897.

In July 1899, during the 1899 MJFA season, South St Kilda withdrew from the competition and disbanded. They were the second club to disband during the season, following St Francis Xavier one month earlier.

Despite the club folding, The Argus reported in April 1900 that South St Kilda was interested in re-joining the MJFA. However, the club did not return for the 1900 season and did not re-emerge following this.
