= Brighton Southern Cross =

Former newspaper in Victoria, Australia

Brighton Southern Cross, 4 January 1896

The Brighton Southern Cross was an English language newspaper published in Brighton, Victoria, Australia.

== History ==
John Stott and G.H. Orford, were successively editors from 1871-1890. John Stott published the first issue on Saturday 27 February 1871 on a single sheet of paper folded into four and priced at one penny. Turnor and Wislon took over from Orford in 1890 and increased the size and scope of the paper. From 1900 C.T. Alexander was proprietor, The Southern Cross set out to be an enlightening commentary on local affairs. The initial circulation took in Brighton, Elsternwick, Moorabbin, Cheltenham, Oakleigh, Mulgrave, Mordialloc, Frankston, Cranbourne and Berwick

== Digitisation ==
This paper has been digitised as part of the Australian Newspapers Digitisation Program of the National Library of Australia

The Brighton Southern Cross 1896-1918 has been digitised and is available on Trove.

== See also ==
List of newspapers in Australia
