= Nunawading Football Club =

Nunawading Lions
- Full name: Nunawading Lions Football Netball Club
- Nickname: Lions
- Founded: 1927
- League: Eastern Football League
- Home ground: Koonung Reserve

Strip
- Maroon with gold stripes

Nunawading Lions Football Netball Club is an Australian rules football and netball club located 20 km east of Melbourne in the suburb of Blackburn North, Victoria. Nunawading's colours are maroon and gold and they are affiliated with the Eastern Football League.

== History ==
"Nunawading Football Club" was first used in 1894, when the Mitcham, Box Hill and Surrey Hills Football Clubs merged to play in the Metropolitan Junior Football Association (now the Victorian Amateur Football Association). The three teams were struggling to field sides at that time and joined for two seasons, before going their separate ways again in 1896. Surrey Hills however, continued to use the Nunawading title until 1907.

The current Nunawading Football Club was established in 1927 as the Tunstall Football Club. Home games were played at the Nunawading Recreation Reserve in Silver Grove. The club played in the Box Hill Reporter District Football Association before moving to the Ringwood District Football League in 1928 and remaining until 1932. From 1933 until 1961 the club played in the Eastern Suburbs Football League. The first premiership was won in 1938 in B Grade. In 1943, the suburb of Tunstall changed its name to Nunawading and the club soon followed. The second premiership was won in 1955, also in B Grade.

In 1962 the club affiliated with the newly established Eastern District Football League as a foundation member. By 1974 the club moved to Mahoneys Reserve in Forest Hill, as the Nunawading Recreation centre was being built. Finally, in 1996 the decision was made to move to Koonung Park in Springfield Road, Blackburn North as there were no social facilities at Mahoneys Reserve. During this period the only premiership success were the 1962 (Under 16), 1976 (Under 17) and 1987 (Reserves).

After a lean period which included five successive wooden spoons, the club recovered somewhat in 2001, to narrowly miss the finals by percentage. In 2002, the club achieved its first senior premiership in 47 years, defeating Heathmont by 93 points in Division 4 and promotion to Division 3.

The club finished seventh in their first two season. In 2005, the club improving to fifth and missing out on finals by just .00002%, but the reserves did make finals. 2006 saw the Seniors play finals, defeating Waverley Blues in the First Semi but losing to eventual premiers South Croydon by twelve points in the Preliminary Final. The Reserves won a premiership by three points in the Grand Final.

In 2007, the Seniors lost to Upper Ferntree Gully in the First Semi, and in 2008 finished 2nd on the ladder but lost both Finals. The Reserves won a premiership in 2008 with a Grand Final win over Mooroolbark by 61 points.

Since 2010, Nunawading have been playing in Division Four. 2017 saw the club include its first ever netball team, making finals in their first year. The netball team went on to win their first Premiership in 2018 competing in Division 6. 2019 was soon followed with another netball premiership.

Nunawading suffered an exodus of players and administrators in the 2010 pre-season, leaving the club with no prospect of being competitive in Division 3 that year. Subsequently, the EFL granted the club's request to be relegated, with Division 4 runner-up Kilsyth taking their place in Division 3.

At the end of the 2018 season, the senior side had a losing streak of 62 matches. Their reserves side had a streak of 55, which was ended in round 12 2017 with a win over the Glen Waverley Hawks in 2017 by six points. The seniors losing streak ended in round one of the 2019 season with a victory over Kilsyth.

In 2024, the club won just two games and saw a mass exodus of players. Senior coach Frank Salanitri also left. As a result, Nunawading will not field a men's senior or reserves team in 2025. The senior team had only won four games in the last three seasons.

The club will still field a netball, women's football and Under 19 team in 2025. The under 19 team is set up a merger with Forest Hill Football Club but will play under the Nunawading name and wear the Nunawading jumper.

== Premierships ==
=== Eastern Suburbs Football League ===
- 1938 B Grade (as the Tunstall Football Club)
- 1955 B Grade (as Nunawading Football Club)

=== Eastern Football League ===
- Seniors: 2002 Division 4
- Reserves: 1987, 2006, 2008
- Juniors: 1962 (U/16), 1976 (U/17)
