= Brighton Football Club =

Names
- Full name: Brighton-Caulfield Football Club
- Nickname: Penguins

Club details
- Founded: 1881; 145 years ago
- Dissolved: c. 1964; 62 years ago
- Colours: Maroon Gold (1946–1964)
- Competition: MJFA (1892–1907); VFA (1908–1964)
- Premierships: VFA (1): 1948; MJFA (1): 1903
- Ground: Brighton Beach Oval; Elsternwick Park

Uniforms
Home

The Brighton Football Club, nicknamed the Penguins, was an Australian rules football club based in the Melbourne suburb of Brighton. The club was a founding member of the Metropolitan Junior Football Association (MJFA) in 1892, before moving to the Victorian Football Association (VFA) in 1908.

After suffering financial hardship throughout the 1950s, the club merged with South Caulfield in 1962 to become the Brighton-Caulfield Football Club, before eventually moving to the suburb of Caulfield and becoming the Caulfield Football Club in 1965.

== History ==
=== Early years ===
An advertisement in The Argus on 8 June 1859 announced a meeting to be held on the 9th of that month, at the Devonshire Hotel, to form the Brighton Football Club. There are references to an active Brighton Park club in 1867, and Brighton Football club in 1872, 1878, 1882 and 1883. It would be presumed that the 1882 & 1883 cases are related to the VFA club, as in 1888 it is stated that the '7th Annual Meeting' of the Brighton club has taken place. This would place the clubs establishment in 1881, 11 years before their MJFA entry.

The club was a foundation member of the Metropolitan Junior Football Association (MJFA) in the inaugural 1892 season, winning their first and only premiership in 1903. The clubs colours were sky and navy blue and they were known as the "Two Blues".

=== VFA ===
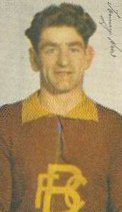
Brighton vice-captain Tommy New

In 1908, Brighton joined the VFA as one of the teams to replace Richmond, who had shifted to the Victorian Football League (VFL), and West Melbourne, who had merged with North Melbourne in a failed attempt to do the same. During this time, Brighton played its home matches at Brighton Beach Oval, before shifting to Elsternwick Park in 1927.

Brighton first played finals football in the VFA in 1926 with help from former Fitzroy player Gordon Rattray who coached the club. They made it all the way to the grand final before losing to Coburg, the club that would beat them again in the grand final the following season. They were runners-up in 1938.

Former professional foot runner, Lynch Cooper was an Aboriginal Australian sprinter who won the Stawell Gift in 1928 and the world's professional sprint championship competition in 1929, played with Brighton in 1935.

Brighton almost folded while the Association was in recess during World War II, but was able to compile a committee and resume playing in 1945 when the Association resumed. Four years later, in 1948, the club won its first and only top division premiership. Under the coaching of Col Williamson, they had finished the home and away season in third place and after defeating Brunswick in the preliminary final they qualified for the decider against Williamstown, whom they downed by nine points.

The club was one of several which struggled badly both on and off the field after the throw-pass era ended in 1950. In twelve seasons from 1952 until 1963, the club won eight wooden spoons, including the first three Division 2 wooden spoons in 1961, 1962 and 1963. The club had a very low supporter base, a very small group of committeemen, who were increasingly unable to manage all of the administrative work, it struggled to retain players, and, in some seasons, it had to operate as an amateur club due to lack of money.

=== Merger ===
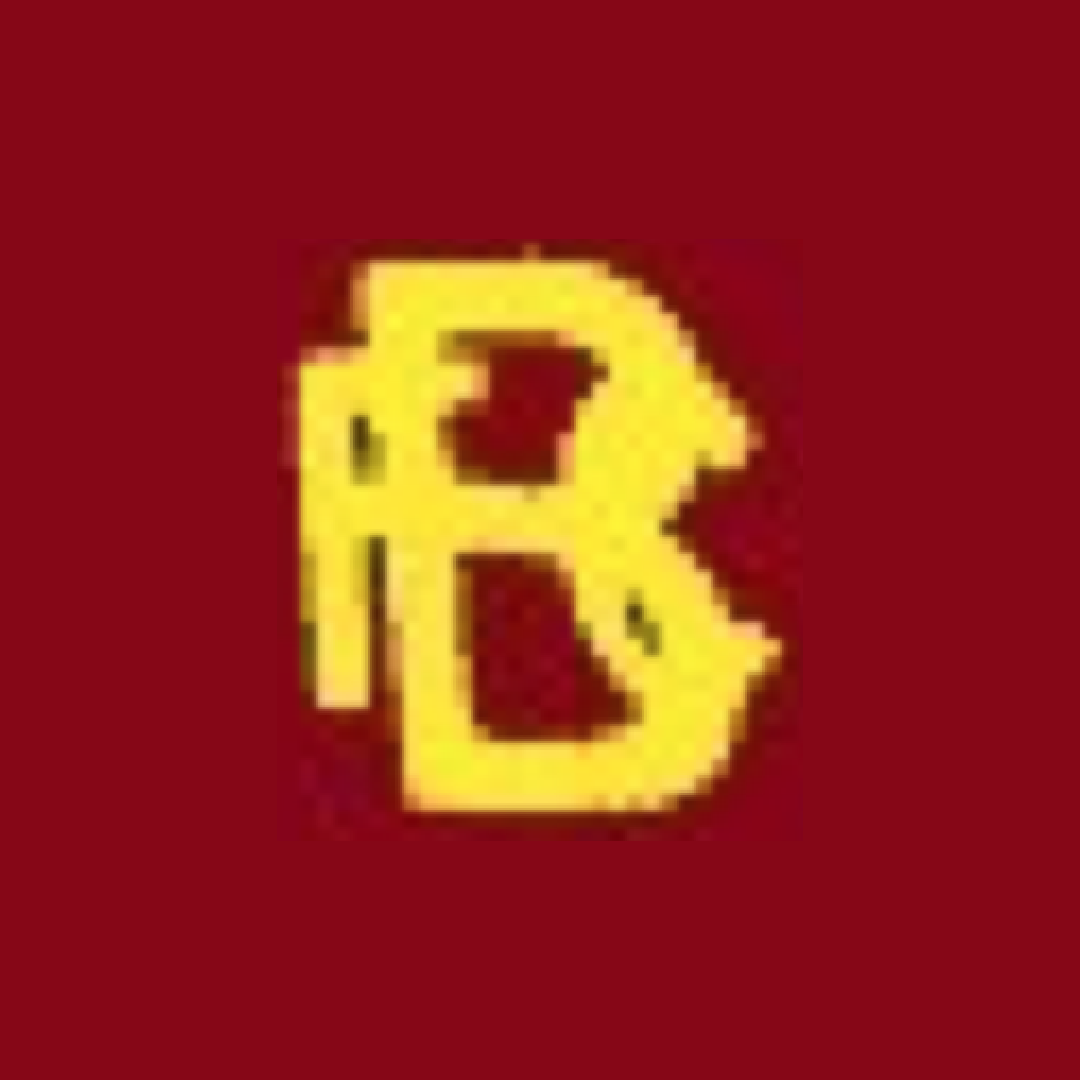
Brighton's monogram used on jumpers

Coupled with its existing off-field problems, the club lost occupancy of its home ground at Elsternwick Park after the 1961 season.

In 1962, the club merged with the South Caulfield Football Club, which played in the Federal District Football League, forming a new team known as Brighton-Caulfield. The merger did not help the club's on-field performances, and its first two seasons as a merged club yielded wooden spoons. The club's on-field performance briefly improved in 1964, when it recruited a core of twelve senior players from defending Division 1 premier Moorabbin after that club's sudden expulsion from the VFA just before the season.

After competing as Brighton-Caulfield for three seasons, the club eliminated almost all links to its Brighton heritage in 1965 as it sought to appeal more strongly to fans in its new suburb. The name was shortened to Caulfield, the Penguin emblem was replaced with a Bear, and the club's colours were changed from maroon and gold to blue and white, effectively bringing an end to the Brighton Football Club's existence. The club competed in the Association as the Caulfield Football Club until the end of the 1987 season.

== Honours ==
=== Premierships ===
- Victorian Football Association (1)
  - 1948

=== Runners up ===
- Victorian Football Association
  - 1938

== Notable players ==
- Carlton – Norm Clark, Percy Daykin, Harry Vallence and Keith Warburton
- Collingwood – John Harris
- Fitzroy – Barclay Bailes and Gordon Rattray
- Melbourne - Hugh Purse
- South Melbourne – Bruce Sloss
- St Kilda – Jack Connell, Gordon Dangerfield and Keith Miller
