= Collegians Football Club =

Australian rules football club

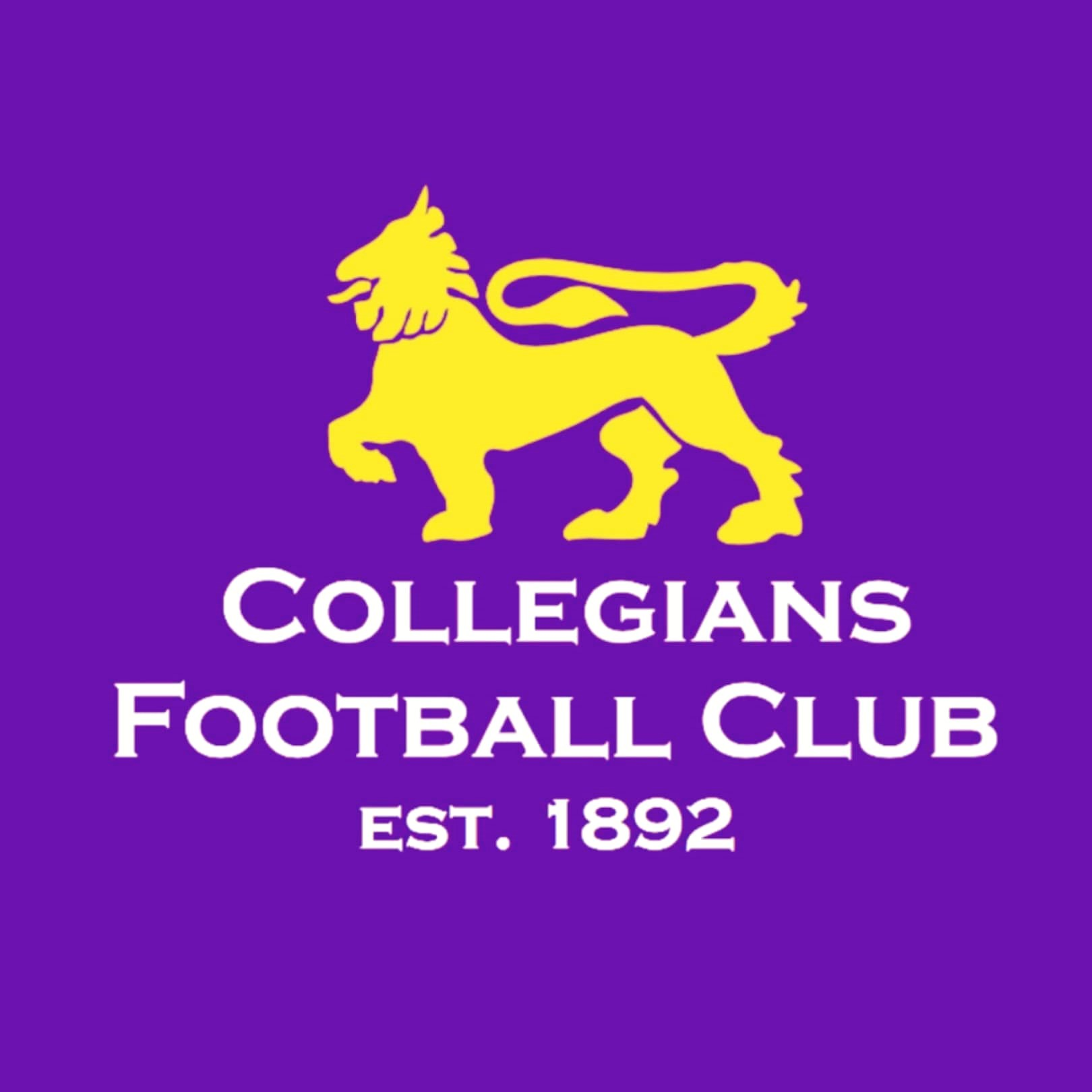

Names
- Full name: Collegians Football Club
- Nickname: Lions

Club details
- Founded: 1892; 134 years ago
- Colours
- Competition: VAFA
- Coach: Jared Rivers
- Premierships: SectionA-1892, 1896, 1898, 1899, 1902, 1904, 1936, 1937, 1957, 1958, 1959, 1961, 1986, 1992, 1993, 2011, 2012, 2023, 2026. Section B-1926, 1956, 2006
- Ground: Harry Trott Oval (Albert Park)

Uniforms
Home

Other information
- Official website: collegiansfc.com.au

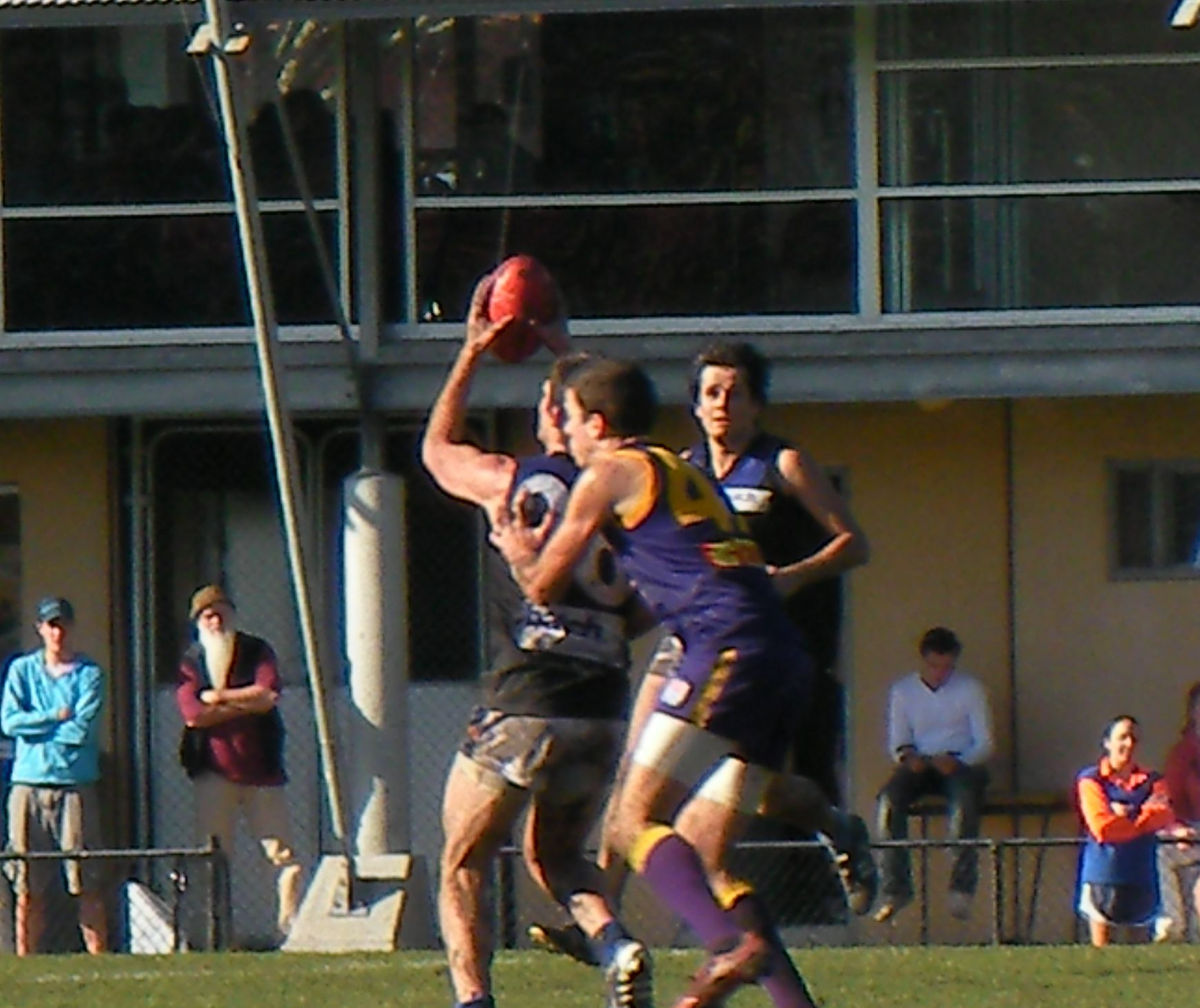
Old Collegians vs Melbourne University Blacks at Collegians' home ground (Albert Park), 2008

Collegians Football Club, nicknamed the Lions, is an Australian rules football club based in the Melbourne suburb of Albert Park.

Formed in 1892, it is the second-oldest club in the Victorian Amateur Football Association (VAFA), after Melbourne University Football Club, although Collegians is the only present-day club that competed in the inaugural VAFA season.

As of 2024, the club's men's and women's teams both compete in the Premier Division of the VAFA and VAFA Women's (VAFAW) respectively.

== History ==
In 1891, Lawrence Adamson established a Wesley College Old Boys' XVIII, which formally became Collegians Football Club in 1892. Adamson, who was for thirty years the Headmaster of Wesley College, was the President of the club for its first forty years.

In 1892, Adamson established the Metropolitan Junior Football Association (MJFA), of which he was president for 37 years, which later was renamed to the VAFA. Collegians entered a "2nd 20" (reserves) team in the inaugural season, while the senior team appears to have been in local schoolboy competitions. The seniors moved to the MJFA the following year in 1893 and have remained there ever since.

Collegian's introduced the clubs first women's football team in 2017, and added a second women's team in 2018. The club fields three senior men's teams, two senior women's teams and an Under 19's team.

== Premierships ==
=== A Section ===
- 1892, 1896, 1898, 1899, 1902, 1904, 1936, 1937, 1957, 1958, 1959, 1961, 1986, 1992, 1993, 2011, 2012, 2023.

=== B Section ===
- 1926, 1956, 2006

== Club song ==
The club's theme song is based on the first verse and chorus of "The Old Collegians Song", which appears in the Wesley College Songbook in all editions from 1893. The lyrics were written by Lawrence Arthur Adamson set to the tune of a traditional Irish Folk Tune, "Irish Jaunting Car", and the later tune "The Bonnie Blue Flag", a song from the Confederacy during the American Civil War. The original lyrics refer to the interim school colours "Blue and White", which returned to "Gold and Purple" at the end of 1902.
