= List of Western Bulldogs players =

This is a list of Western Bulldogs players who have made one or more appearance in the Australian Football League, known as the Victorian Football League until 1990 and the AFL Women's The Western Bulldogs were previously known as the Footscray Football Club until 1997.

== Western Bulldogs players ==
Key
Order	Players are listed in order of debut
Seasons	Includes Western Bulldogs only careers and spans from the season of the player's debut to the year in which they played their final game for the Western Bulldogs
Debut	Debuts are for VFL/AFL regular season and finals series matches only
Games	Statistics are for VFL/AFL regular season and finals series matches only and are correct to the end of 2025
Goals	Statistics are for VFL/AFL regular season and finals series matches only and are correct to the end of 2025
^{^}	Currently listed players

=== 1920s ===
Debut year	Player	Games	Goals	Years at club
1925	George Bayliss	9	18	1925
1925	Bill Doolan	44	2	1925–1928
1925	Wally Fraser	6	3	1925
1925	Rupert Gibb	12	8	1925
1925	Rowley Griffiths	10	0	1925
1925	Allan Hopkins	151	205	1925–1934
1925	Col Laidlaw	25	1	1925–1926
1925	Martin Larkin	3	0	1925
1925	Con McCarthy	30	17	1925–1926
1925	Tommy McHenry	21	13	1925–1926
1925	Bill McIntyre	13	0	1925
1925	Jack Meuleman	7	0	1925
1925	Tom Mullens	7	11	1925
1925	Frank Nielsen	4	0	1925
1925	Les Punch	11	10	1925
1925	Vic Samson	27	8	1925–1926
1925	Jack Sherman	10	0	1925
1925	Wally White	3	0	1925
1925	Alby Outen, Sr.	65	0	1925–1930
1925	Sid Thompson	10	5	1925, 1927
1925	George Garlick	2	1	1925
1925	Harry Harrison	2	0	1925
1925	Charlie Zinnick	1	0	1925
1925	Jack Sands	6	2	1925
1925	Joshua Croft	24	17	1925–1927
1925	Joe Nunan	27	6	1925–1927
1925	John Sutherland	1	0	1925
1925	Fred Ulbrick	7	0	1925, 1927
1925	Norm McDonald	51	67	1925–1928
1925	Jimmy Rudd	10	0	1925
1925	Ted Sherman	41	1	1925, 1931–1933
1925	George Clissold	16	4	1925–1926
1925	Harry Neill	17	3	1925–1927
1925	Paddy O'Brien	15	0	1925–1926
1925	Frank Aked Sr.	108	59	1925–1932
1925	Alex Gardiner Sr.	23	0	1925–1926
1925	Seddon Bagley	5	6	1925–1926
1926	Harry Baker	111	19	1926–1934
1926	Les Chapple	32	82	1926–1928
1926	Charlie Gaudion	63	7	1926–1929
1926	Rupe Hopkins	1	0	1926
1926	Doug Johnstone	37	0	1926–1928
1926	Tom Jones	8	1	1926
1926	Charlie Rowe	55	13	1926–1929
1926	Jack Sharpley	8	2	1926–1927
1926	Harry Johns	20	11	1926–1928
1926	Gus Howell	6	2	1926
1926	Frank Barton	2	0	1926
1926	Park Krygger	1	0	1926
1926	Bill Freyer	7	0	1926
1926	Jim McGlone	6	3	1926
1926	George Anthony	15	4	1926–1927
1926	Roy Thompson	47	0	1926–1929
1926	Dave Dick	4	5	1926
1926	Dick Wilkinson	2	1	1926
1926	Bertie Crellin	2	0	1926
1926	Jim Considine	4	1	1926
1926	Joe Knott	5	0	1926
1926	Ted Butler	2	1	1926–1927
1927	Fred Birnstihl	2	0	1927
1927	Frank Bult	20	4	1927–1928
1927	Ivan McAlpine	112	24	1927–1933
1927	Paddy Scanlan	33	15	1927–1928
1927	Jack Wunhym	10	1	1927–1929
1927	Artie Malberg	1	0	1927
1927	Stan Whight	4	0	1927
1927	Don Wallace	8	4	1927
1927	Archie Whitfield	1	2	1927
1927	Ralph Greenhalgh	30	0	1927–1928
1927	George Valentine	8	0	1927–1928
1927	Ted Cahill	20	16	1927–1928
1927	Charlie Anderson	1	0	1927
1927	Henry Power	2	0	1927
1927	George Woodman	18	18	1927–1928
1927	Arthur Stevens	64	23	1927–1932
1927	Sam Glover	8	0	1927
1927	Roy Day	2	0	1927
1927	Charlie Sloley	25	35	1927–1929
1928	Alby Morrison	224	369	1928–1938, 1941–1942, 1946
1928	Jack O'Brien	5	12	1928
1928	Jack Watt	35	4	1928–1929
1928	Fred Hansen	1	0	1928
1928	Wally Warden	19	9	1928, 1930
1928	Gerry Matheson	16	13	1928
1928	Joe Lukeman	8	0	1928–1929
1928	Bill Spurling	98	70	1928–1935
1928	Bill Aldag	2	0	1928
1928	Arthur Barlow	7	2	1928–1929
1928	Bob McGann	5	0	1928
1928	Norm Woodman	38	8	1928–1930
1928	Leo Conlon	3	1	1928
1929	Eric Andersen	22	2	1929–1930
1929	Jack Donovan	1	0	1929
1929	Richard Greenwood	11	0	1929–1930
1929	Bill Russ	36	19	1929–1930
1929	Lew Sharpe	19	7	1929–1930
1929	Jack Webb	2	0	1929
1929	Arthur Williams	38	4	1929–1932
1929	Bill Downie	54	26	1929–1932
1929	Gil Patrick	3	1	1929
1929	Jack Robertson	12	6	1929
1929	Ernie Nunn	26	19	1929–1931
1929	Gene Sullivan	3	2	1929
1929	Bernie O'Brien	88	129	1929–1930, 1933–1938
1929	Eric Shade	20	11	1929–1930
1929	George Robbins	13	0	1929–1930
1929	Frank Walshe	25	4	1929–1931
1929	Albert Barker	2	0	1929
1929	Bonnie Izzard	3	3	1929
1929	Bobby Mills	1	0	1929
1929	George Thompson	1	0	1929
1929	George Stanley	10	1	1929–1930
1929	Frank Hughes	2	0	1929
1929	John Sampson	13	1	1929–1931
1929	Eric Fordham	1	0	1929

=== 1930s ===
Debut year	Player	Games	Goals	Years at club
1930	Fred Coppock	9	1	1930
1930	Stan Harris	8	3	1930
1930	Ron James	1		1930
1930	Roy McKay	101	10	1930–1935
1930	Roy Williams	9	10	1930
1930	Roy O'Donnell	7		1930
1930	Arthur Smith	3	5	1930
1930	Bill Sherman	21	4	1930–1932
1930	Horrie Stanway	20	4	1930–1931
1930	Harry Bollman	1		1930
1930	Bertie Sharp	2		1930
1930	Tom Sutherland	10	12	1930, 1932, 1934
1930	Leon Bazin	13	2	1930–1931
1930	Cyril Harley	1		1930
1930	Johnny Stanley	2		1930
1931	Bob Addison	1		1931
1931	Bill Cubbins	33		1931–1932, 1934
1931	Jack Hanson	29		1931–1933
1931	Jack Hayes	13	7	1931
1931	Jimmy Joyce	13	5	1931
1931	Alf Lambe	32		1931–1932
1931	Walter Minogue	38	19	1931–1933
1931	Kevin Scanlan	1		1931
1931	Doug Ayres	2	1	1931
1931	Jack Dennington	10	3	1931
1931	Wally O'Brien	49	2	1931–1934
1931	Jack Fincher	36	24	1931–1933
1931	Jock Cordner	7	4	1931–1932
1931	Norm Sexton	1		1931
1932	Les Dayman	34	68	1932–1934
1932	Stan Penberthy	75	22	1932–1937
1932	Norman Ware	200	220	1932–1942, 1944–1946
1932	Tom Waye	53	43	1932–1935
1932	Matt Cave	10	1	1932–1933
1932	Tommy Eason	1		1932
1932	Les Herring	2	1	1932
1932	Roy Rodwell	51	27	1932–1935
1932	John Dowling	17	29	1932–1933
1932	Mort Browne	1		1932
1933	Wally Kelly	22	3	1933–1935, 1938
1933	Alan Rait	19	62	1933–1934
1933	Jack Somerville	10	1	1933–1934
1933	Peter Hannan	6		1933
1933	Ambrose Palmer	83	44	1933–1934, 1936–1943
1933	Bill Findlay	5	8	1933–1934
1933	Charlie O'Leary	16		1933–1935
1933	Jack Vosti	26		1933–1934
1933	Milton McIntyre	14	11	1933
1933	Bob Muir	22	1	1933–1934
1933	Bill Grundy	28	4	1933–1934
1933	Mick Higgins	2		1933
1933	Reg Thomas	9	10	1933–1934
1933	Norm Honey	10	4	1933–1934
1933	Frank Spilling	14		1933–1934, 1936
1933	Charlie Richards	2		1933
1934	Ted Baker	3	5	1934
1934	Dick Pollard	25	22	1934–1935
1934	Ted Trim	17	17	1934–1935
1934	George Bennett	108	14	1934–1940
1934	Billy Leahy	40	22	1934–1936
1934	Ken Lockhart	5	1	1934
1934	Percy Streeter	5	3	1934
1934	Bob Spargo Sr.	65	6	1934–1941
1934	Les Bogie	25	4	1934–1936
1934	Percy Jackson	3		1934
1934	Leo Ryan	119	3	1934–1941
1935	Jack Bridgfoot	35	5	1935–1937
1935	Dick Eason	25	21	1935–1937
1935	Pye Lewis	22	8	1935–1936
1935	Hugh McLaughlin	33		1935–1937
1935	Col Mitchell	12	2	1935–1937
1935	Fred McEvoy	7		1935
1935	Arthur Olliver	272	354	1935–1950
1935	Jack Ryan	74	37	1935–1939
1935	Reg Collier	2		1935
1935	Cliff MacRae	58	62	1935–1939
1935	Clarrie Shields	13	8	1935–1937
1935	Eric Crompton	1		1935
1935	Vern Lamprell	12	5	1935–1936
1935	Vince Hamilton	6	2	1935
1935	Sid Dockendorff	17	15	1935–1937
1935	Jim Hallahan Jr.	17	6	1935–1937
1935	Jack Keane	1		1935
1935	Marty Phelan	3		1935
1935	Rob Sainsbury	43	2	1935, 1937–1941
1935	George Winter	2		1935
1935	Alf Sampson	60	4	1935–1936, 1938–1940, 1942, 1946
1936	Artie Ferguson	26	1	1936–1937
1936	Bob Flanigan	49	1	1936–1940
1936	Wal Johnson	1		1936
1936	Edwin Latham	2	2	1936
1936	Paul Standfield	42	14	1936–1940
1936	Tom Crouch	4	2	1936
1936	Roy Evans	49	15	1936–1939
1936	Jack McDonagh	14	4	1936
1936	Jack McMillan	4	17	1936
1936	Frank Finn	3	2	1936–1937
1936	Les Johnson	5		1936
1937	Horace Edmonds	1		1937
1937	Jim Greenham	79	47	1937–1941, 1943–1945
1937	Clarrie White	4	1	1937
1937	Roy Porter	28	23	1937–1940
1937	Jim Thoms	120	101	1937–1946
1937	Jack Zimmerman	14	2	1937–1939
1937	Rowley Flynne	9		1937
1937	Frank Halloran	4		1937
1937	Joe Ryan	167	261	1937–1948
1937	Noel Alsop	7	4	1937–1938
1937	Bennie Le Sueur	18	1	1937, 1939
1937	Charlie Luke	18	46	1937–1939
1937	Stan Livingstone	16	3	1937, 1939–1940
1937	Lindsay McLure	4	2	1937–1938
1937	Doug Menzies	14	3	1937–1939
1937	Don Wilson	7		1937–1939
1937	Harry Hickey	174	169	1937–1942, 1944–1948
1937	Tommy Smith	2		1937
1937	Don Dilks	6		1937–1938
1937	Ron Paternoster	1		1937
1937	Billy Stephens	7	5	1937–1938
1937	Wally Glenister	8	6	1937–1938
1937	Cyril Cooper	1		1937
1938	Fred Godfrey	6	5	1938
1938	Joe McGrath	2	1	1938
1938	Alf Clay	8	4	1938–1939
1938	Jim Miller	131	27	1938–1941, 1943–1948
1938	Jack Coolahan	12	12	1938–1939
1938	Roy Deller	2		1938
1938	Reg Evenden	109	13	1938–1943, 1945–1948
1938	Charlie Page	43	113	1938–1941
1938	Matt Carland	1		1938
1939	Pat Cahill	47	19	1939–1941, 1943–1944, 1946–1947
1939	Allan Collins	99	178	1939–1944, 1946
1939	Tom Tribe	101	5	1939–1946
1939	Allan Jacobsen	30	27	1939, 1945
1939	Hughie McPherson	13	4	1939–1940
1939	Bill Ryan	26	23	1939–1940
1939	Marty McDonnell	92	2	1939–1941, 1944, 1946–1950
1939	Don Seymour	2		1939
1939 -1940	Haydn Sharp	4	4	1939
1939	John Flint	2		1939
1939	Jack Malone	1		1939
1939	Charlie Merton	3	3	1939
1939	Bill Shaw	2		1939
1939	Leo Hillis	5		1939, 1944
1939	Andy McMaster	2		1939

=== 1940s ===
Debut year	Player	Games	Goals	Years at club
1940	Ted Ellis	65	2	1940–1944
1940	Jim May	6	3	1940–1941
1940	Len Murphy	25	28	1940–1941
1940	Harry Dolphin	15	0	1940, 1942
1940	Alf Boniface	2	0	1940
1940	George Tribe	66	80	1940–1946
1940	Billy Power	12	0	1940–1942, 1946
1940	Bill Crosling	17	5	1940–1941
1940	Dick Chirgwin	3	0	1940
1940	Lloyd Robinson	1	0	1940
1941	Wally Harris	20	8	1941–1943
1941	Bill Houston	29	44	1941–1944
1941	Wally Shearer	20	18	1941–1942
1941	Frank Kelly	8	0	1941, 1944
1941	Percy Malbon	9	6	1941
1941	Eric Huppatz	4	4	1941–1942
1941	Kevin O'Halloran	5	3	1941
1941	Joe De Medici	10	16	1941–1942
1941	Jack J. Malone	6	0	1941, 1943
1941	Len McCankie	143	10	1941–1950
1941	Jack Borlase	3	0	1941
1942	Bert McTaggart	59	1	1942–1945
1942	Norm Chisholm	29	2	1942–1943
1942	Ron Grove	72	54	1942–1947
1942	Charlie Sutton	173	65	1942, 1946–1956
1942	Frank Cahill	21	18	1942–1944
1942	George Dougherty	25	30	1942–1943
1942	Vic Nankervis	2	3	1942
1942	Jack Gibby	5	6	1942
1942	Les Neal	1	3	1942
1942	Jack Gray	11	0	1942–1943
1943	Gordon Hale	5	2	1943
1943	Bill McTaggart	47	56	1943–1945
1943	Gerry O'Neill	16	2	1943–1944
1943	Keith Palmer	5	4	1943
1943	Merv Dudley	30	10	1943–1945
1943	Tom McMahon	2	0	1943
1943	Don Bauer	10	0	1943
1943	Harry Gingell	26	2	1943, 1945
1943	Pat Hand	63	2	1943–1947, 1949
1943	Joe Weldon	9	3	1943–1944, 1946
1943	Jack Law	6	3	1943–1944
1943	Allan Moncrieff	67	44	1943, 1945–1951
1943	Del Kennedy	17	1	1943–1945
1943	Herb Esse	10	0	1943–1944
1944	Don S. Henderson	11	2	1944
1944	Dick Wearmouth	100	27	1944, 1946–1952
1944	Bill Wood	115	294	1944, 1946–1951
1944	Alf Benison	9	6	1944
1944	George McLaren	139	24	1944–1951
1944	Jack Sutton	13	8	1944–1945
1944	Harry Chalmers	13	3	1944–1945
1944	Gerry Sexton	10	0	1944–1945
1944	Mal McBean	4	0	1944–1945
1945	Allan Broadway	16	13	1945–1946
1945	Ted Ryan	6	7	1945
1945	Merv Laffey	72	85	1945–1952
1945	Roy Rawlings	4	1	1945
1945	Col Witney	5	0	1945
1945	Jack Welsh	29	12	1945–1949
1945	Vic Mather	4	0	1945–1946
1945	Dan Taylor	3	3	1945
1946	Evan Rees	80	2	1946–1950
1946	Jack Logan	31	14	1946–1948
1946	Ken Scott	13	3	1946–1947
1946	Don Coulton	7	0	1946
1946	Bruce Fountain	23	1	1946–1947
1946	Wally Donald	205	1	1946–1958
1947	Tim Robb	40	63	1947–1949
1947	Norm Gardner	2	0	1947
1947	Bob Templeton	22	14	1947–1949, 1953
1947	Lou Barker	23	5	1947–1949
1947	Norm Webb	47	17	1947–1949
1947	Norm Armstrong	4	1	1947–1948
1947	Dick Collinson	2	0	1947
1947	Tom Miller	34	3	1947–1950
1947	Clive Yewers	11	4	1947–1948
1947	Dave Bryden	147	56	1947–1955
1947	Alby Linton	53	46	1947–1952
1947	Laurie Raine	2	0	1947
1947	Lindsay Baglin	1	0	1947
1947	Max Isaac	26	10	1947–1950, 1952
1948	Bob Reid	19	27	1948–1949
1948	Les Parker	2	0	1948
1948	Alan Bulman	32	11	1948–1952
1948	Geoff Vanderfeen	13	0	1948–1951
1948	Stan Wallis	7	4	1948–1949
1948	Eric Cumming	14	2	1948–1949
1948	Vin Morrissey	13	0	1948–1949
1948	Jack Storey	11	6	1948–1949
1948	Jack King	36	3	1948–1953
1948	Vern Wilson	1	0	1948
1949	Bruce Reid Sr.	28	15	1949–1951
1949	Bill Scanlan	72	34	1949–1953
1949	Frank Scanlan	18	13	1949
1949	Bill Davies	1	0	1949
1949	Alan Martin	105	8	1949–1954
1949	Bernie Hogan	2	0	1949
1949	Angus Abbey	78	0	1949–1954
1949	Bernie Laffey	4	0	1949
1949	Vic Bodsworth	5	5	1949–1950
1949	Ron Pocock	1	0	1949

=== 1950s ===
Debut year	Player	Games	Goals	Years at club
1950	Jack Collins	154	385	1950–1958
1950	Reg Egan	30	33	1950–1953
1950	Don C. Henderson	27	17	1950–1951, 1953
1950	Bill Reardon	20	10	1950–1952
1950	Bernie Smallwood	13	4	1950–1952
1950	Norm Edwards	3	1	1950–1951
1950	Bill Kelly	7	1	1950
1950	Frank McRae	45	6	1950–1954
1950	John Barrett	32	1	1950–1953
1950	Morrie Hutcheson	5	0	1950
1950	Norm Charles	5	8	1950–1951
1950	Herb Henderson	130	0	1950–1958
1951	Peter Box	107	43	1951, 1953–1957
1951	Len Kent	24	19	1951–1953
1951	Ted Whitten	321	360	1951–1970
1951	Brian Willis	2	0	1951
1951	Les Murray	11	6	1951
1951	Bert Connolly	11	0	1951–1952
1951	Ron Richards	12	8	1951–1952
1951	Jim Gallagher	151	0	1951–1960
1951	Frank Aked Jr.	4	0	1951–1952
1951	Arthur Edwards	120	26	1951–1960
1952	Roger Duffy	117	117	1952–1958
1952	Brian Gilmore	105	61	1952–1958
1952	Roy Harper	40	26	1952–1955
1952	Don Ross	129	20	1952–1958
1952	Stan Beal	7	0	1952–1953
1952	Allan Rogers	22	13	1952–1953
1952	Doug Reynolds	80	17	1952–1958
1952	Eddie Phillips	7	8	1952
1952	Ray Crozier	1	0	1952
1952	Jack Edwards	1	0	1952
1952	Bob Slater	6	3	1952–1953
1952	Ian Foreman	2	0	1952
1952	Ron Stockman	73	1	1953–1958
1953	Ron McCarthy	42	3	1953–1956
1953	Norm Thompson	6	0	1953–1954
1953	Harvey Stevens	72	71	1953–1957
1953	Allen Warren	28	2	1953–1955
1953	John Kerr	81	94	1953–1958
1953	Kevin White	9	0	1953–1954, 1956
1953	Tom M. Jones	13	6	1953–1954
1953	Ian Letcher	18	1	1953–1956
1953	Ron Porta	63	2	1953–1959
1953	Jack Nuttall	27	0	1953–1955
1953	Lionel Ollington	5	3	1953
1953	Allan Trusler	16	22	1953–1955
1954	Lindsay Ellis	1	0	1954
1954	Bob Collins	20	1	1954–1956
1954	Alby Outen Jr.	2	0	1954
1954	Peter McPhee	4	0	1954
1954	Nick Gelavis	4	0	1954
1954	Lionel Ryan	32	12	1954–1957
1955	Alex Gardiner	92	18	1955–1956, 1958–1962
1955	Frank McDowell	1	0	1955
1955	Kevin J. Smith	17	7	1955–1956
1955	Allan Clough	17	4	1955–1957
1955	Ron Dixon	10	0	1955–1956
1955	Kevin Smith	7	13	1955–1956
1955	John Westacott	34	0	1955–1957, 1959
1956	Noel Dickson	16	12	1956–1957
1956	Brian Buckley	37	3	1956–1959
1956	Don Whitten	24	3	1956–1958
1956	Graham Thompson	1	0	1956
1956	Don Rawson	18	0	1956–1957
1956	Max Cross	21	54	1956–1957
1956	Ray Broadway	13	0	1956, 1958
1956	Byron Guthrie	4	0	1956–1957
1956	Ron Henriksen	19	0	1956–1958
1956	Peter McRae	13	0	1956–1957
1957	Bernie Lee	95	8	1957–1963
1957	John Quarrell	53	17	1957–1962
1957	Bobby Clark	5	1	1957–1958
1957	Jack O'Halloran	17	13	1957–1958
1957	Bill Costello	16	10	1957–1958
1957	Pat Fitzgerald	1	0	1957
1957	Kelvin Payne	35	5	1957–1959, 1963–1964
1957	Brian Moloney	17	1	1957–1959
1957	Bob Hempel	2	2	1957
1957	Noel Ryan	2	1	1957
1957	Lyall Anderson	24	5	1957–1959
1957	John Hoiles	117	7	1957–1964
1957	Barrie Kerr	27	20	1957–1959
1958	Ron Howard	30	22	1958–1960
1958	John Schultz	188	37	1958–1968
1958	Barry Connolly	13	20	1958
1958	Brian Prior	13	9	1958–1960
1958	John Jillard	189	1	1958–1970
1958	John Bradbury	25	2	1958, 1960–1961, 1963
1958	Alan McAsey	3	2	1958
1958	John Clegg	24	14	1958–1960
1958	Bob Spargo	80	43	1958–1963
1958	Ike Whittaker	8	1	1958–1959
1958	Don Darcey	16	2	1958–1960
1958	Ian Fleming	9	10	1958–1959
1958	Ray Baxter	80	120	1958–1964
1958	Graham Ion	107	85	1958–1965
1959	Eon Densworth	3	0	1959
1959	Terry Devery	31	28	1959–1961
1959	Cameron McDonald	42	23	1959–1963
1959	Bob Ware	65	40	1959–1963
1959	John Brereton	17	0	1959–1960
1959	Phil Gehrig	16	11	1959–1960
1959	Noel Long	12	12	1959–1960
1959	Peter Barker	1	0	1959
1959	Jack Slattery	32	41	1959–1962
1959	Barry Thornton	22	2	1959–1961
1959	Ralph Edwards	4	0	1959
1959	Wally Trusler	1	0	1959
1959	Keith Beamish	34	23	1959–1961
1959	Peter Wood	14	0	1959–1961
1959	Alan McGill	1	0	1959
1959	Ray Walker	72	1	1959–1965

=== 1960s ===
Debut year	Player	Games	Goals	Years at club
1960	Trevor Elliott	23	9	1960–1961
1960	Ian Howard	16	0	1960
1960	Barney McKellar	22	11	1960–1962
1960	Reg Kent	8	4	1960–1962
1960	Charlie Evans	42	0	1960–1963
1960	Ian Bryant	160	21	1960–1969
1960	Ray Whitzell	3	0	1960
1960	Max Graham	19	20	1960–1963
1960	Barry Smith	78	15	1960–1965
1960	Bob Turner	4	0	1960
1960	Max Oates	4	1	1960
1961	Charlie Stewart	20	4	1961
1961	Bernie Dowling	18	8	1961–1963
1961	Barry Ion	40	5	1961–1965
1961	Ken Duff	67	15	1961–1965
1961	Jim Gutterson	7	0	1961–1962
1961	Owen Madigan	7	2	1961–1962
1961	Graeme Taylor	2	0	1961–1962
1961	Merv Hobbs	74	115	1961–1965
1962	Bill Harrington	21	10	1962–1963
1962	Graeme Chalmers	75	37	1962–1968
1962	George Savige	4	0	1962
1962	Murray Zeuschner	64	4	1962–1967
1962	Don McKenzie	137	128	1962–1970
1962	Kevin Meddings	1	0	1962
1962	Ron Blain	4	0	1962–1963
1962	Niels Becker	10	3	1962–1963
1962	John Edwards	1	0	1962
1963	George Bisset	166	288	1963–1972
1963	David Darcy	133	47	1963–1966, 1968–1971
1963	Bob Parsons	4	0	1963
1963	Bob Spurling	6	2	1963, 1965
1963	John Bradley	43	12	1963–1967
1963	Jack Greenwood	23	0	1963–1964
1963	Rod Coutts	16	22	1963–1964
1963	Eddie O'Halloran	6	2	1963–1964
1963	Ron Birch	1	0	1963
1963	Bob Gray	23	20	1963–1966
1963	Col Bendelle	3	0	1963
1963	Ivan Marsh	77	33	1963–1969
1963	Robert Schultz	2	0	1963
1964	Frank Johnson	6	4	1964
1964	Rob Taylor	13	0	1964–1965
1964	Gary Dark	6	8	1964, 1966
1964	Noel Fincher	46	7	1964–1968
1964	Sam Magill	5	2	1964–1965
1964	John Charles	17	4	1964–1966
1964	Algy Vosilaitis	28	14	1964–1966
1964	Alan Hunter	15	8	1964–1967
1964	Johnny Miles	6	0	1964
1964	Barrie Beattie	4	4	1964–1966
1964	Bob Barr	7	1	1964–1965
1964	Garry Peters	18	3	1964–1967
1965	Kevin Stevens	43	30	1965–1968
1965	Bryan Pleitner	28	7	1965–1968
1965	Peter Ennals	1	0	1965
1965	Alan Mannix	112	44	1965–1972
1965	Peter Castrikum	6	0	1965
1965	Ron McGowan	92	2	1965–1972
1965	Dallas Patterson	13	10	1965–1968
1965	Kevin Jackman	33	36	1965–1968
1965	Rod O'Connor	9	0	1965–1967
1965	Peter Shanahan	23	0	1965–1967
1965	David Thorpe	151	79	1965–1973
1966	Graeme M. Cook	37	17	1966–1970
1966	Frank Fanning	2	0	1966
1966	Doug Prior	15	19	1966–1967
1966	Kevin Delmenico	65	1	1966–1970
1966	Greg Dowd	1	0	1966
1966	Gary Merrington	174	46	1966–1975
1966	Ted Burgess	5	0	1966
1966	John Reilly	55	1	1966–1969
1966	Laurie Sandilands	160	228	1966–1977
1966	Ricky Spargo	64	65	1966–1971
1966	Joe McGhie	11	0	1966–1967
1967	Fred Cook	33	2	1967–1969
1967	Gary Dempsey	207	105	1967–1978
1967	Ken Greenwood	73	7	1967–1972
1967	Len Cumming	18	9	1967–1969
1967	Ray Haynes	29	1	1967, 1969–1970
1967	Robert Percy	6	0	1967–1968
1967	Laurie Walsh	3	1	1967
1968	Graeme Bean	7	1	1968
1968	Brian Harvey	2	0	1968
1968	Les Bartlett	60	18	1968–1970, 1972–1975
1968	Stuart Magee	132	77	1968–1975
1968	Peter Hines	12	12	1968–1970
1968	Peter Welsh	165	92	1968–1978
1968	Doug Magor	2	1	1968
1968	Ian Wallace	2	0	1968
1968	Kevin McLeod	1	1	1968
1968	Tony Hill	1	0	1968
1969	Bruce Davidson	3	0	1969
1969	Bruce Greenhill	1	0	1969
1969	Graeme Joslin	24	0	1969–1971
1969	Richard Radziminski	14	0	1969–1971
1969	Barry Round	135	136	1969–1975
1969	Gordon Casey	125	5	1969–1975
1969	Laurie Rippon	45	4	1969–1973
1969	Geoff Thatcher	2	0	1969
1969	Norm Mitchell	5	1	1969
1969	Harry Skreja	18	13	1969–1971
1969	Stephen Power	177	25	1969–1979
1969	Robbie McGhie	49	6	1969–1972, 1979
1969	Bernie Quinlan	177	241	1969–1977
1969	Tad Joniec	2	1	1969, 1971

=== 1970s ===
Debut year	Player	Games	Goals	Years at club
1970	Ron Fenton	11	15	1970–1971
1970	Bill Godridge	12	5	1970–1972
1970	Trevor Zeltner	18	3	1970, 1972
1970	Charlie Pagnoccolo	46	51	1970–1973
1970	Roger McHardy	2	1	1970–1971
1970	Graeme Austin	50	17	1970–1974
1970	Ian Salmon	113	36	1970–1976
1970	Mike Pokrovsky	3	0	1970, 1972
1970	Clive Newman	2	0	1970–1971
1970	Grant Simmons	30	1	1970–1971, 1973–1976
1971	Ross Abbey	123	65	1971–1981
1971	Colin Shaw	10	2	1971–1972
1971	Don Brown	29	15	1971–1974
1971	Graeme G. Cook	21	7	1971–1973
1971	Bruce Rohde	4	0	1971
1971	Trevor Wilson	1	0	1971
1971	Bruce Lake	2	0	1971
1971	Les Stillman	3	1	1971
1971	Colin Dell	66	10	1971–1977
1971	John Keast	8	2	1971, 1973
1971	Max Parker	5	6	1971
1971	Bob Cockerell	21	11	1971–1972
1972	Garry Baker	14	9	1972–1973
1972	Ken Marks	3	0	1972
1972	Carl Vesty	3	0	1972–1973
1972	Denis Collins	100	60	1972–1977
1972	Ralph Thomas	6	0	1972
1972	Ray Stamp	6	3	1972
1972	Bruce Neish	1	0	1972
1972	Stephen Boyle	6	10	1972
1972	Bob Fox	1	2	1972
1972	Max O'Halloran	13	2	1972–1974
1972	Alan Stoneham	128	42	1972–1979
1972	Gary Steel	6	3	1972–1973
1973	Ron Jacks	11	5	1973
1973	Adrian Gallagher	54	38	1973–1975
1973	Harry Frei	6	0	1973
1973	Terry Wilkins	20	1	1973–1974
1973	Glenn Gingell	45	21	1973–1976
1973	Colin Boyd	10	0	1973
1973	Ian Dunstan	172	135	1973–1982
1973	Robert Rose	9	2	1973
1973	Ian Morrison	110	101	1973–1980
1973	Ivan Rasmussen	35	42	1973–1975
1973	Ted Carroll	1	0	1973
1973	Ian Wickson	2	0	1973
1974	Daryl Collins	1	0	1974
1974	Geoff Jennings	137	136	1974–1983
1974	Greg Parke	37	56	1974–1975
1974	Ray Huppatz	66	74	1974–1977
1974	Kelvin Templeton	143	494	1974–1982
1974	Ted Whitten Jr.	144	133	1974–1982
1974	Terry Wheeler	157	18	1974–1983
1974	Peter Morrison	1	0	1974
1974	Ian Robertson	4	1	1974
1974	Marty McMillan	7	0	1974–1975
1974	John Burleigh	1	0	1974
1974	Mark Cross	4	1	1974
1974	Jeff Gieschen	24	1	1974–1978
1975	Peter Featherby	42	15	1975–1976
1975	Ian Low	67	65	1975–1979
1975	Neil Sachse	2	1	1975
1975	John Reid	78	2	1975–1981
1975	Richard Murrie	68	10	1975–1979
1975	Lee Perussich	45	12	1975–1979
1975	Ross Gallagher	11	4	1975–1976, 1981
1976	Alan Lynch	5	1	1976
1976	Ken Newland	18	12	1976
1976	Ian Hampshire	111	73	1976–1982
1976	Dennis Blair	41	9	1976–1978
1976	Mick Kelly	57	18	1976–1980
1976	Alby Smedts	51	4	1976–1979
1976	Peter Munro	19	12	1976–1978
1976	Garry Wheeler	5	3	1976, 1978
1977	Jim Edmond	154	226	1977–1985
1977	Phil Fleming	3	0	1977
1977	Bruce Reid Jr.	86	23	1977–1982
1977	Wayne Foreman	40	29	1977–1979
1977	Graeme Linke	5	0	1977–1978
1977	Matt Johnson	8	4	1977–1978, 1980–1981
1977	Jack Dinatale	11	5	1977–1979
1978	George Brown	7	4	1978–1979
1978	Doug Hawkins	329	216	1978–1994
1978	Glen Scanlon	5	4	1978
1978	Don Henwood	2	0	1978
1978	Robert Groenewegen	79	29	1978–1980, 1982–1986
1978	Angelo Tantsis	4	0	1978–1979
1978	Brian Wilson	9	5	1978–1979
1978	Phil Bradmore	15	17	1978–1981
1978	Wayne Fox	1	0	1978
1978	Mick Egan	128	12	1978–1987
1978	Norm Tivendale	7	1	1978–1979
1978	Greg Davis	5	0	1978–1981
1978	Tony Fox	1	0	1978
1979	Neil Bristow	10	4	1979
1979	Gary Cowton	40	4	1979–1980
1979	Steven Hoffman	11	5	1979
1979	Shane Loveless	28	72	1979–1981
1979	Neil Cordy	139	28	1979–1986
1979	Robbie Peers	3	0	1979
1979	Mark Williams	5	1	1979
1979	John Moylan	21	1	1979–1980
1979	Bill Berry	43	18	1979–1982
1979	Michael McKenna	80	45	1979–1984
1979	Gordon Polson	5	1	1979–1981
1979	Shane Walsh	2	1	1979

=== 1980s ===
Debut year	Player	Games	Goals	Years at club
1980	Robert Anderson	16	6	1980, 1983–1984
1980	Andrew Pollett	2	0	1980
1980	Paul Ross	3	1	1980
1980	Russell Tweeddale	8	1	1980
1980	Alan Atkinson	6	3	1980
1980	Stan Davidson	62	14	1980–1983
1980	Greg Towns	23	7	1980–1982
1980	Jeff Berry	35	4	1980–1982
1980	Colin Seery	11	4	1980–1981
1980	Matt Byrachevski	3	2	1980
1980	Peter Hickmott	11	4	1980
1980	Glen Sampson	6	1	1980
1980	Terry De Koning	31	2	1980–1982
1980	Brian Perrin	34	8	1980–1983
1980	Alan McConnell	37	5	1980–1982
1980	Brian O'Keefe	3	1	1980
1980	Chris Burton	67	27	1980–1984
1980	Bryan Edwards	2	0	1980–1981
1981	Steven Knight	17	17	1981–1983
1981	Terry Wight	3	0	1981
1981	Brian Cordy	124	18	1981–1988
1981	Alister Ford	21	17	1981–1985
1981	Mark Komp	23	9	1981–1982
1981	Warren Stanlake	1	0	1981
1981	Rick Kennedy	158	34	1981–1991
1981	Kevin Sait	13	18	1981
1981	Jim McAllester	24	4	1981–1982
1982	Simon Beasley	154	575	1982–1989
1982	Allan Jennings	9	15	1982
1982	Terry Love	13	11	1982–1983
1982	Stephen MacPherson	188	152	1982–1995
1982	Steve Hargrave	2	0	1982
1982	Gary Walpole	12	5	1982–1983
1982	Ross Christensen	10	16	1982–1983
1982	Lindsay Sneddon	2	1	1982
1982	Jamie Barham	1	0	1982
1982	Darren Brown	1	0	1982
1982	Rod MacPherson	43	24	1982–1986
1982	Ian Rickman	11	10	1982–1984
1982	Darren Grant	1	0	1982
1982	Bruce West	1	0	1982
1983	Chris Hansen	28	1	1983–1984
1983	Mark Kellett	63	3	1983–1986
1983	Stephen Lunn	21	5	1983–1984
1983	Andrew Purser	112	16	1983–1987
1983	Brian Royal	199	299	1983–1993
1983	Robert Semmens	7	3	1983–1984
1983	Jim Sewell	76	62	1983–1986
1983	John Taylor	2	2	1983
1983	Stephen Wallis	261	57	1983–1996
1983	Ian Williams	33	45	1983–1985
1983	Peter Foster	163	56	1983–1993
1983	Bruce Duperouzel	25	24	1983–1984
1983	Michael McLean	95	23	1983–1989
1983	Andrew Taylor	1	0	1983
1983	Con Gorozidis	5	10	1983
1983	Robbert Klomp	9	3	1983–1984
1984	Emmett Dunne	14	7	1984–1985
1984	Allan Edwards	12	17	1984
1984	John Riley	1	0	1984
1984	Zeno Tzatzaris	34	0	1984–1990
1984	Darren Baxter	129	28	1984–1992
1984	John Bennett	3	8	1984
1984	Les Bamblett	37	59	1984–1988
1985	Tony Buhagiar	25	36	1985
1985	Allen Daniels	32	21	1985–1986
1985	Michael Ford	96	19	1985–1989, 1991
1985	Brad Hardie	47	28	1985–1986
1985	Phil Maylin	33	8	1985–1986
1985	Graeme Cordy	6	3	1985–1986
1985	Peter Baxter	23	2	1985–1988
1985	Neil Peart	9	5	1985
1985	Angelo Petraglia	49	56	1985–1989
1986	Max Crow	12	18	1986
1986	Tony McGuinness	109	108	1986–1990
1986	Murray Rance	40	5	1986–1987
1986	Michael Rolfe	2	1	1986
1986	Andy Preston	2	0	1986
1986	Tim Gepp	14	1	1986
1986	Darren Saunders	6	0	1986
1986	Matt Hannebery	32	4	1986–1990
1986	Craig Somerville	8	7	1986
1986	Greg Eppelstun	102	1	1986–1992
1986	Tony Liberatore	283	95	1986–2002
1986	Robert Evans	1	0	1986
1986	Dean Chiron	1	1	1986
1986	Mark Cullen	35	25	1986–1991
1987	Richard Cousins	60	21	1987–1989, 1991
1987	Phil Cronan	26	5	1987–1988
1987	Troy Moloney	36	4	1987, 1989–1992
1987	Brenton Vilcins	8	0	1987–1988
1987	Simon Atkins	127	76	1987, 1989–1994
1987	Ron James	16	6	1987–1989
1987	Cameron Wright	2	0	1987
1987	Andrew Howlett	2	1	1987
1987	Shane Williams	13	9	1987–1988
1987	Mark Athorn	17	4	1987–1989
1987	Frank Lesiputty	2	1	1987
1987	Darren Collins	24	37	1987–1989
1987	Lynton Fitzpatrick	18	4	1987–1989
1987	Steven Kolyniuk	177	198	1987–2000
1988	Matthew Hogg	59	4	1988–1991
1988	Mark Hunter	130	10	1988–1996
1988	Russell Shields	3	7	1988
1988	Terry Wallace	69	20	1988–1991
1988	Darren Davies	37	35	1988–1990
1988	Stuart Nicol	7	4	1988–1989
1988	David Allday	6	1	1988
1988	Michael Svilar	7	0	1988, 1990
1988	Gary Irvine	7	0	1988
1988	Adrian Campbell	30	31	1988–1990, 1992
1988	Stuart Wigney	47	21	1988–1991
1988	Scott Wynd	237	31	1988–2000
1989	John Georgiades	15	27	1989–1991
1989	Phil O'Keeffe	9	19	1989
1989	Mark Williams	14	13	1989–1990
1989	Tony Evans	3	1	1989
1989	Tim Harrington	18	0	1989–1990
1989	Nigel Kellett	101	41	1989–1997
1989	Justin Charles	36	24	1989–1993

=== 1990s ===
Debut year	Player	Games	Goals	Years at club
1990	Glenn Coleman	69	51	1990–1993
1990	Chris Grant	341	554	1990–2007
1990	Barry Standfield	98	38	1990–1996
1990	Leon Cameron	172	68	1990–1999
1990	Keenan Reynolds	74	35	1990–1994
1990	Danny Del-Re	62	139	1990–1994
1990	Jon Ballantyne	20	46	1990–1993
1990	Shannon Corcoran	23	2	1990–1994
1991	Jamie Grant	5	1	1991
1991	Phil Krakouer	7	7	1991
1991	Paul Gow	7	0	1991
1991	Ben Sexton	39	32	1991–1995
1991	Matthew Croft	186	72	1991–2004
1991	Matthew Mansfield	32	5	1991–1993
1991	Darren Stanley	3	2	1991
1992	Tony Campbell	43	4	1992–1993, 1996
1992	Rohan Smith	300	254	1992–2006
1992	Bernard Toohey	40	4	1992–1993
1992	Steven Kretiuk	170	11	1992–2003
1992	Michael Frost	13	3	1992–1993
1992	Gary Barrow	6	1	1992–1993
1992	John Cuzzupe	1	0	1992
1993	Scott West	324	104	1993–2008
1993	Ilija Grgic	62	92	1993–1996
1993	Shane Ellen	11	1	1993, 1995
1993	Peter Quill	67	20	1993–1997
1993	Anthony Darcy	14	2	1993–1994
1993	Luke Beveridge	31	29	1993–1995
1993	Brad Nicholson	34	1	1993–1996
1993	Alan Thorpe	12	23	1993–1994
1994	Scott Allen	15	8	1994–1997
1994	Daniel Southern	103	28	1994–2000
1994	Jason Watts	57	51	1994–1998
1994	Kym Koster	38	13	1994–1995
1994	Robbie West	7	1	1994
1994	Craig Ellis	107	6	1994–2001
1994	Richard Osborne	51	98	1994–1996
1994	Daniel Hargraves	38	62	1994–1997
1994	Brad Johnson	364	558	1994–2010
1994	Luke Darcy	226	183	1994–2005, 2007
1995	Tyson Lane	19	19	1995–1998
1995	Jose Romero	122	71	1995–2001
1995	Sedat Sir	24	0	1995–1998
1995	Michael Johnston	2	0	1995
1995	Michael Martin	48	18	1995–1999
1995	Sam Phillipou	3	3	1995
1995	Simon Cox	58	24	1995–2001
1995	Daryl Griffin	18	0	1995–1996
1995	Andrew Nichol	3	0	1995
1995	Paul Dimattina	131	56	1995–2003
1996	Todd Curley	115	47	1996–2001
1996	Scott Taylor	1	0	1996
1996	Brad Wira	61	4	1996–1998
1996	James Cook	49	96	1996–1999
1996	Mark West	16	3	1996–1998
1996	Allen Jakovich	7	7	1996
1997	Nathan Brown	137	206	1997–2003
1997	Matthew Dent	63	10	1997–2000
1997	Paul Hudson	108	214	1997–2001
1997	Simon Minton-Connell	25	53	1997–1998
1997	Brett Montgomery	78	68	1997–1999, 2006–2007
1997	David Round	2	0	1997
1997	Stephen Powell	30	21	1997–1999
1997	Adam Contessa	45	8	1997–2001
1998	Paul Dooley	14	2	1998, 2000–2001
1998	Simon Garlick	137	114	1998–2004
1998	Mark Alvey	45	28	1998–2003
1999	Josh Mahoney	11	2	1999–2000
1999	Nicky Winmar	21	34	1999
1999	Matthew Robbins	139	135	1999–2007
1999	Kingsley Hunter	57	28	1999–2002
1999	Jim Plunkett	10	1	1999–2000
1999	Christin Macri	5	3	1999–2000

=== 2000s ===
Debut year	Player	Games	Goals	Years at club
2000	Trent Bartlett	42	34	2000–2002
2000	Nathan Eagleton	221	186	2000–2010
2000	Andrew Wills	10	6	2000
2000	Mitch Hahn	181	164	2000–2010
2000	Luke Penny	35	5	2000–2002
2000	Patrick Wiggins	12	5	2000–2003
2000	Bob Murphy	312	183	2000–2017
2001	Ben Harrison	85	32	2001–2005
2001	Lindsay Gilbee	206	119	2001–2012
2001	Jordan McMahon	114	37	2001–2007
2001	Daniel Giansiracusa	265	331	2001–2012
2001	Patrick Bowden	50	55	2001–2005
2002	Daniel Bandy	45	46	2002–2005
2002	Ryan Hargrave	203	37	2002–2012
2002	Aaron James	1	0	2002
2002	Shane Birss	51	20	2002–2006
2002	Nathan Saunders	10	11	2002
2002	Daniel Cross	210	33	2002–2013
2002	Kieran McGuinness	26	7	2002–2006
2002	Sam Power	84	16	2002–2007
2002	Brian Lake	197	32	2002–2012
2003	Scott Bassett	15	1	2003–2004
2003	Wayde Skipper	45	19	2003–2008
2003	Matthew Boyd	292	86	2003–2017
2003	Nick Bruton	2	0	2003
2004	Adam Cooney	219	186	2004–2014
2004	Steven Koops	11	0	2004
2004	Adam Morgan	14	6	2004–2006
2004	Jade Rawlings	29	32	2004–2005
2004	Peter Street	61	13	2004–2008
2004	Cameron Faulkner	18	9	2004–2007
2004	Farren Ray	75	32	2004–2008
2004	Will Minson	191	81	2004–2015
2004	Brad Murphy	7	6	2004–2005
2005	Ryan Griffen	202	130	2005–2014
2005	Dale Morris	253	3	2005–2017
2005	Tim Walsh	1	1	2005
2005	Cameron Wight	36	6	2005–2008
2006	Shaun Higgins	129	128	2006–2014
2006	Damien McCormack	4	0	2006
2006	Travis Baird	3	4	2006
2006	Dylan Addison	88	30	2006–2013
2007	Jason Akermanis	77	114	2007–2010
2007	Andrew McDougall	5	2	2007
2007	Jarrod Harbrow	70	21	2007–2010
2007	Tom Williams	85	14	2007–2014
2007	Malcolm Lynch	2	0	2007
2007	Andrejs Everitt	36	8	2007–2010
2007	Josh Hill	66	75	2007–2011
2007	Stephen Tiller	21	7	2007–2009
2008	Ben Hudson	88	9	2008–2011
2008	Scott Welsh	40	63	2008–2009
2008	Tim Callan	19	1	2008–2009
2008	Callan Ward	60	33	2008–2011
2008	Sam Reid	10	1	2008–2011
2009	Liam Picken	198	87	2009–2019
2009	Jarrad Grant	81	83	2009–2015
2009	Brennan Stack	21	17	2009–2011
2009	Easton Wood	160	18	2009–2021

=== 2010s ===
Debut year	Player	Games	Goals	Years at club
2010	Barry Hall	39	135	2010–2011
2010	Brodie Moles	17	10	2010–2011
2010	Jordan Roughead	126	28	2010–18
2010	Liam Jones	110	68	2010–2014; 2023–2025
2010	Andrew Hooper	7	7	2010–2012
2011	Nathan Djerrkura	21	8	2011–2012
2011	Tom Liberatore^	257	91	2011–
2011	Lukas Markovic	29	5	2011–2013
2011	Justin Sherman	24	21	2011–2012
2011	Mitch Wallis	162	109	2011–2022
2011	Zephaniah Skinner	8	5	2011–2012
2011	Christian Howard	20	3	2011–2014
2011	James Mulligan	3	0	2011
2011	Ed Barlow	8	4	2011
2011	Luke Dahlhaus	154	110	2011–2018
2011	Jayden Schofield	7	0	2011
2011	Ayce Cordy	27	15	2011–2015
2011	Jason Tutt	26	22	2011–2014
2011	Patrick Veszpremi	12	5	2011–2013
2012	Tory Dickson	114	181	2012–2020
2012	Clay Smith	55	43	2012–2019
2012	Mark Austin	29	1	2012–2014
2012	Daniel Pearce	6	0	2012–2015
2012	Tom Campbell	42	23	2012–2017
2012	Jason Johannisen	212	77	2012–2025
2012	Michael Talia	30	3	2012–2015
2012	Lin Jong	65	33	2012–2021
2012	Fletcher Roberts	47	0	2012–2019
2013	Brett Goodes	22	4	2013–2015
2013	Nick Lower	13	2	2013
2013	Koby Stevens	63	32	2013–2016
2013	Tom Young	19	3	2013–2014
2013	Jack Macrae	249	59	2013–2024
2013	Jake Stringer	89	160	2013–2017
2013	Nathan Hrovat	30	14	2013–2016
2013	Lachie Hunter	138	61	2013–2022
2014	Stewart Crameri	42	70	2014–2017
2014	Marcus Bontempelli^	258	253	2014–
2014	Sam Darley	7	1	2014–2015
2014	Mitch Honeychurch	22	12	2014–15
2014	Jack Redpath	34	56	2014–2018
2015	Tom Boyd	52	42	2015–2019
2015	Lukas Webb	19	6	2015
2015	Bailey Dale^	178	87	2015–
2015	Shane Biggs	52	7	2015–2017
2015	Joel Hamling	23	0	2015–2016
2015	Toby McLean	102	62	2015–2023
2015	Caleb Daniel	175	47	2015–2024
2015	Josh Prudden	4	0	2015–2017
2015	Roarke Smith	47	14	2015–2016, 2018–2022
2015	Zaine Cordy	118	12	2015–2022
2016	Marcus Adams	27	4	2016–2018
2016	Josh Dunkley	114	65	2016–2022
2016	Matt Suckling	76	34	2016–2020
2016	Jed Adcock	7	1	2016
2016	Bailey Williams^	174	43	2016–
2016	Kieran Collins	1	0	2016
2017	Travis Cloke	10	11	2017
2017	Tim English^	154	90	2017–
2017	Lewis Young	24	1	2017–2021
2017	Patrick Lipinski	56	30	2017–2021
2018	Hayden Crozier	71	4	2018–2023
2018	Billy Gowers	33	39	2018–2020
2018	Aaron Naughton^	166	286	2018–
2018	Jackson Trengove	32	5	2018–2020
2018	Ed Richards^	148	58	2018–
2018	Josh Schache	45	53	2018–2022
2018	Brad Lynch	9	2	2018
2018	Fergus Greene	5	5	2018
2019	Taylor Duryea	101	4	2019–2025
2019	Sam Lloyd	32	45	2019—2020
2019	Bailey Smith	103	44	2019–2024
2019	Will Hayes	11	4	2019—2020
2019	Lachie Young	8	1	2019—2020
2019	Ryan Gardner^	54	3	2019–
2019	Rhylee West^	81	85	2019–

=== 2020s ===
Debut year	Player	Games	Goals	Years at club
round 1, 2020	Josh Bruce	50	63	2020–2023
round 1, 2020	Ben Cavarra	4	4	2020–2021
round 1, 2020	Alex Keath	79	4	2020–2024
round 2, 2020	Laitham Vandermeer^	87	44	2020–
round 4, 2020	Louis Butler	4	0	2020–2022
round 7, 2020	Cody Weightman^	76	126	2020–
round 8, 2020	Callum Porter	1	0	2020
round 1, 2021	Stefan Martin	13	1	2021—2022
round 1, 2021	Lachlan McNeil^	75	42	2021–
round 1, 2021	Anthony Scott	59	29	2021–2025
round 1, 2021	Adam Treloar^	85	59	2021–
round 5, 2021	Jordon Sweet	11	2	2021–2022
round 7, 2021	Mitch Hannan	30	21	2021–2023
round 8, 2021	Buku Khamis^	41	20	2021–
round 11, 2021	Riley Garcia^	39	15	2021–
round 17, 2021	Jamarra Ugle-Hagan	67	103	2021–2025
round 4, 2022	Tim O'Brien	18	1	2022–2023
round 6, 2022	Robbie McComb	18	7	2022–2023
round 9, 2022	Luke Cleary^	23	2	2022–
round 16, 2022	Dominic Bedendo	2	1	2022–2024
round 21, 2022	Sam Darcy^	45	89	2022–
round 1, 2023	Oskar Baker^	33	10	2023–
round 1, 2023	Rory Lobb^	59	32	2023–
round 3, 2023	Arthur Jones^	18	7	2023–
round 9, 2023	James O'Donnell^	48	7	2023–
round 16, 2023	Caleb Poulter	23	8	2023–2025
round 1, 2024	Lachlan Bramble^	47	7	2024–
round 1, 2024	Nick Coffield^	12	0	2024–
round 1, 2024	Harvey Gallagher^	25	9	2024–
round 1, 2024	James Harmes	22	16	2024–2025
round 1, 2024	Ryley Sanders^	39	13	2024–
round 8, 2024	Charlie Clarke	1	0	2024
round 9, 2024	Joel Freijah^	41	23	2024–
round 1, 2025	Sam Davidson^	24	16	2025–
round 1, 2025	Josh Dolan^	13	3	2025–
round 1, 2025	Matthew Kennedy^	28	23	2025–
round 5, 2025	Cooper Hynes^	12	6	2025–
round 7, 2025	Jedd Busslinger^	7	0	2025–
round 23, 2025	Jordan Croft^	6	6	2025–
round 0, 2026	Connor Budarick^	5	1	2026–
round 0, 2026	Lachie Jaques^	4	0	2026–
round 0, 2026	Michael Sellwood^	5	0	2026–
round 1, 2026	Will Lewis^	1	0	2026–
round 5, 2026	Louis Emmett^	1	0	2026–

== Listed players yet to make their debut for the Western Bulldogs ==
Player	Date of birth	Acquired	Recruited from	Listed	
Player	Date of birth	Acquired	Recruited from	Rookie	Senior
Lachlan Smith	5 October 2005	No. 47, 2023 national draft	Gippsland Power	—N/a	2024–
Luke Kennedy	11 October 2006	No. 62, 2024 national draft	Sandringham Dragons	—N/a	2025–
Zac Walker	3 March 2006	No. 12, 2025 mid-season rookie draft	Gippsland Power	2025–	—N/a
Lachlan Carmichael	27 August 2007	No. 21, 2025 national draft	North Shore Bombers	—N/a	2026–
Will Darcy	14 March 2007	No. 60 (F/S), 2025 national draft	Oakleigh Chargers	—N/a	2026–

== Western Bulldogs AFLW players ==
Key
Order	Players are listed in order of jumper number
Seasons	Includes Western Bulldogs only careers and spans from the season of the player's debut to the year in which they played their final game for the Western Bulldogs
Debut	Debuts are for AFLW regular season and finals series matches only and the season they made their club debut.
Games	Statistics are for AFLW regular season and finals series matches only and are correct to the end of 2024
Goals	Statistics are for AFLW regular season and finals series matches only and are correct to the end of 2024
^{^}	Currently listed players

=== 2010s ===
Debut year	Player	Games	Goals	Years at club
2017	Brooke Lochland	35	18	2017–2022
2017	Ellie Blackburn^	71	29	2017–
2017	Katie Brennan	13	15	2017–2019
2017	Aasta O'Connor	12	3	2017–2018
2017	Emma Kearney	15	3	2017–2018
2017	Kirsten McLeod	34	24	2017–2023
2017	Jaimee Lambert	6	5	2017
2017	Kate Tyndall	7	0	2017
2017	Lisa Williams	6	0	2017
2017	Nicole Callinan	24	1	2017–2020
2017	Lauren Spark	28	0	2017–2021
2017	Kimberley Ebb	4	0	2017
2017	Laura Bailey	8	1	2017–2018
2017	Ellyse Gamble	24	0	2017; 2019–2022
2017	Meg McDonald	4	1	2017
2017	Hayley Wildes	15	1	2017–2019
2017	Libby Birch	22	1	2017–2019
2017	Tiarna Ernst	22	0	2017–2019
2017	Romy Timmins	2	0	2017
2017	Bailey Hunt^	50	2	2017–
2017	Hannah Scott	32	2	2017–2022
2017	Lauren Morecroft	2	0	2017
2017	Courtney Clarkson	6	1	2017
2017	Rebecca Neaves	5	0	2017
2017	Kirsty Lamb	67	25	2017–2023
2017	Jess Gardner	5	1	2017
2017	Angelica Gogos	28	1	2017–2021
2018	Isabel Huntington	20	18	2018–2022
2018	Deanna Berry^	51	17	2018–
2018	Monique Conti	15	4	2018–2019
2018	Bonnie Toogood	37	29	2018–2022
2018	Naomi Ferres^	60	2	2018–
2018	Daria Bannister	1	0	2018
2018	Aisling Utri	14	7	2018–2019
2018	Kim Rennie	24	1	2018–2021
2018	Emma Mackie	7	1	2018–2019
2018	Jessica Anderson	6	1	2018
2018	Jenna Bruton	8	3	2018
2019	Eleanor Brown	39	1	2019–2024
2019	Belinda Smith	3	0	2019
2019	Celine Moody	42	7	2019–2023
2019	Aisling McCarthy	12	7	2019–2020
2019	Kate Bartlett	1	0	2019
2019	Selena Karlson	3	0	2019

=== 2020s ===
Debut year	Player	Games	Goals	Years at club
2020	Gabby Newton	36	10	2020–2023
2020	Gemma Lagioia	26	0	2020–2023
2020	Elisabeth Georgostathis^	54	4	2020–
2020	Britney Gutknecht^	33	6	2020–
2020	Ashleigh Guest	21	0	2020–2022
2020	Hannah Munyard	3	1	2020
2020	Nell Morris-Dalton	20	8	2020–2022 (S7)
2020	Danielle Marshall	11	3	2020–2021
2020	Amelia van Oosterwijck	1	0	2020
2020	Katy Herron	6	0	2020
2021	Isabella Grant^	44	1	2021–
2021	Katie Lynch	35	0	2021–2023
2021	Sarah Hartwig^	49	19	2021–
2021	Isabelle Pritchard^	45	7	2021–
2021	Jess Fitzgerald^	51	11	2021–
2022	Elle Bennetts^	29	4	2022–
2022	Aurora Smith	11	0	2022–2024
2022	Elizabeth Snell	14	0	2022–2024
2022	Jemima Woods	2	0	2022 (S6)
2022	Amanda Ling	2	0	2022 (S6)
2022	Richelle Cranston	26	14	2022-2023
2022	Alice Edmonds^	40	3	2022–
2022	Annabel Strahan	1	0	2022
2022 (S7)	Daisy Bateman	14	3	2022 (S7)–2023
2022 (S7)	Heidi Woodley	21	8	2022 (S7)–
2022 (S7)	Millie Brown	5	0	2022 (S7)–2023
2022 (S7)	Keely Coyne	12	1	2022 (S7)–2024
2022 (S7)	Rylie Wilcox	30	7	2022 (S7)–
2023	Dominique Carruthers	19	1	2023–
2023	Maggie Gorham^	8	0	2023–
2023	Brianna McFarlane	12	7	2023–2024
2023	Jorja Borg	7	1	2023–2024
2023	Dominique Carbone	2	0	2023
2023	Sarah Skinner	1	0	2023
2024	Elaine Grigg^	11	2	2024–
2024	Jasmyn Smith^	11	0	2024–
2024	Brooke Barwick^	5	0	2024–
2024	Kristie-Lee Weston-Turner^	7	4	2024–
2024	Cleo Buttifant^	10	0	2024–
2024	Ellie Gavalas^	6	1	2024–
2024	Analea McKee^	7	3	2024–
2024	Lauren Ahrens^	7	0	2024–
2025	Emma McDonald^	7	3	2025–
2025	Sarah Poustie^	6	0	2025–
2025	Keeley Hardingham^	1	0	2025–
2025	Mua Laloifi^	1	0	2025–

== See also ==
- List of Western Bulldogs coaches
