= Trusler =

Trusler may refer to:

- Trusler Sports Complex, located in Emporia, Kansas
- Peter Trusler (born 1954), an Australian artist
- Allan Trusler (born 1933), a former Australian rules footballer
- Wally Trusler (1941–2008), a former Australian rules footballer
- John Trusler (1735–1820), an English divine
