= Graeme Cook =

Graeme Cook may refer to:

- Graeme G. Cook (born 1950), Australian footballer for Footscray between 1971 and 1973
- Graeme M. Cook (born 1948), Australian footballer for Footscray between 1966 and 1970
- Graeme Cook (racing driver), Australian sports car racing driver

== See also ==
- Graham Cook (1893–1916), New Zealand professional rugby league footballer
