= Norm Thompson =

Norm Thompson may refer to:

- Norm Thompson (American football) (born 1945), American football player in the 1970s
- Norm Thompson Outfitters, American catalog retailer founded by Norm A. Thompson
- Norm Thompson (Australian footballer) (born 1933)
