= Walter Fraser =

Walter Fraser may refer to:

- Ian Fraser, Baron Fraser of Tullybelton (Walter Ian Reid Fraser), British judge
- Wally Fraser (Walter Edward Fraser), Australian rules footballer

== See also ==
- Sir Walter Fraser Oakeshott, Transvaal-born British schoolmaster and academic
- Walt Frazier, American basketball player
