= Tivendale =

Tivendale may refer to:

- Tivendale, Northern Territory, a suburb of Darwin
- Greg Tivendale (born 1979), former Australian rules footballer
- Norm Tivendale (born 1955), former Australian rules footballer
