= Peter McPhee =

Peter McPhee may refer to:

- Peter McPhee (cricketer) (born 1963), Australian cricketer
- Peter McPhee (footballer) (born 1934), Australian rules footballer
- Peter McPhee (academic) (born 1948), Australian academic, and former Provost of the University of Melbourne
