= Peter Munro =

Peter Munro may refer to:

- Pete Munro (born 1975), American baseball pitcher
- Peter Munro (footballer) (born 1957), Australian rules footballer
- Peter Jay Munro (1767–1833), American lawyer and politician
