= Roy Rawlings =

Roy Rawlings may refer to:

- Roy Rawlings (footballer) (1921–2014), Australian rules footballer
- Roy Willard Rawlings (1883–1973), member of the Rhode Island House of Representatives
