= Jack Hanson =

Jack Hanson may refer to:

- Jack G. Hanson (1930–1951), U.S. Army soldier and Medal of Honor recipient
- Jack Hanson (footballer) (1909–1989), Australian rules footballer
