= Frank Barton =

Frank Barton may refer to:

- Frank Barton (English footballer) (born 1947), English football midfielder
- Frank Barton (Australian footballer) (1900–1983), Australian rules footballer
- Frank Barton (rugby league), English rugby league footballer of the 1940s and 1950s
