= Huppatz =

Huppatz is a surname. Notable people with the surname include:

- Eric Huppatz (1918–1983), Australian rules footballer
- Kevin Huppatz (born 1945), Australian rules footballer
- Ray Huppatz (born 1948), Australian rules footballer
- Rosa Zelma Huppatz (1906–1982), Australian army nurse and hospital matron
