= Arthur Barlow =

Arthur Barlow may refer to:

- Arthur Barlow (politician) (1876–1962), South African politician
- Arthur Barlow (footballer) (1904–1951), Australian rules footballer

== See also ==
- Arthur Barlowe
