= Tony Fox =

Tony Fox may refer to:

- Tony Fox (rower) (1928–2010), Guernsey-born doctor and rower
- Tony Fox (rugby union) (1933–2026), Australian rugby union player
- Tony Fox (Australian rules footballer) (born 1958), Australian footballer for Footscray

== See also ==
- Tony Fox Sales (born 1951), American bass guitarist
