= Noel Ryan (footballer) =

Australian rules footballer

Personal information
- Full name: Noel Ryan
- Born: 10 November 1935
- Died: 30 August 2015 (aged 79)
- Original team: Yarrawonga
- Height: 177 cm (5 ft 10 in)
- Weight: 76 kg (168 lb)

Playing career^{1}
Years	Club	Games (Goals)
1957	Footscray	2 (1)
- ^{1} Playing statistics correct to the end of 1957.

Noel Ryan (10 November 1935 – 30 August 2015) was an Australian rules footballer who played with Footscray in the Victorian Football League (VFL).
