= Bill Houston (Australian footballer) =

Australian rules footballer, born 1918

Personal information
- Full name: Bill Houston
- Born: 14 August 1918
- Died: 25 November 1982 (aged 64)
- Original team: Victor Socials
- Height: 180 cm (5 ft 11 in)
- Weight: 78 kg (172 lb)

Playing career^{1}
Years	Club	Games (Goals)
1941–44	Footscray	29 (44)
- ^{1} Playing statistics correct to the end of 1944.

Bill Houston (14 August 1918 – 25 November 1982) was a former Australian rules footballer who played with Footscray in the Victorian Football League (VFL).
