= Gary Steel =

Australian rules footballer

Personal information
- Full name: Gary Steel
- Born: 11 June 1954 (age 72)
- Original team: Albion
- Height: 175 cm (5 ft 9 in)
- Weight: 73 kg (161 lb)

Playing career^{1}
Years	Club	Games (Goals)
1972–73	Footscray	6 (3)
- ^{1} Playing statistics correct to the end of 1973.

Gary Steel (born 11 June 1954) is a former Australian rules footballer who played with Footscray in the Victorian Football League (VFL).

Gary Steel author of Polished Honey
