= Les Parker =

Australian rules footballer

Personal information
- Full name: Francis Leslie Parker
- Born: 19 March 1927
- Died: 15 January 2014 (aged 86)
- Height: 187 cm (6 ft 2 in)
- Weight: 96 kg (212 lb)

Playing career^{1}
Years	Club	Games (Goals)
1948	Footscray	2 (0)
1948–50	Port Melbourne (VFA)	31 (9)
- ^{1} Playing statistics correct to the end of 1950.

Francis Leslie Parker (19 March 1927 – 15 January 2014) was an Australian rules footballer who played with Footscray in the Victorian Football League (VFL).

Parker had two games (both as 19th/20th man) for Footscray in early 1948 before moving to Port Melbourne in the middle of the year.

Les Parker died in January 2014.
