= Max Graham (footballer) =

Australian rules footballer

Personal information
- Full name: Max Graham
- Born: 13 July 1942 (age 84)
- Original team: Footscray District
- Height: 170 cm (5 ft 7 in)
- Weight: 67 kg (148 lb)
- Position: Rover

Playing career^{1}
Years	Club	Games (Goals)
1960–63	Footscray	19 (20)
- ^{1} Playing statistics correct to the end of 1963.

Max Graham (born 13 July 1942) is a former Australian rules footballer who played with Footscray in the Victorian Football League (VFL).
