= Ron Fenton (Australian footballer) =

Australian rules footballer

Personal information
- Full name: Ron Fenton
- Born: 23 September 1950 (age 76)
- Original team: Spotswood
- Height: 185 cm (6 ft 1 in)
- Weight: 83 kg (183 lb)

Playing career^{1}
Years	Club	Games (Goals)
1970–71	Footscray	11 (15)
- ^{1} Playing statistics correct to the end of 1971.

Ron Fenton (born 23 September 1950) is a former Australian rules footballer who played with Footscray in the Victorian Football League (VFL).
