= Tom Jones (footballer, born 1904) =

Australian rules footballer

Personal information
- Full name: Tom Jones
- Born: 10 September 1904
- Died: 27 January 1944 (aged 39)

Playing career^{1}
Years	Club	Games (Goals)
1926	Footscray	8 (1)
- ^{1} Playing statistics correct to the end of 1926.

Tom Jones (10 September 1904 – 27 January 1944) was an Australian rules footballer who played with Footscray in the Victorian Football League (VFL).

He was a defender who was recruited from the local district.
