= Russell Tweeddale =

Australian rules footballer

Personal information
- Born: 27 June 1954 (age 72)
- Original team: Redan
- Height: 185 cm (6 ft 1 in)
- Weight: 82 kg (181 lb)

Playing career^{1}
Years	Club	Games (Goals)
1977–1979	St Kilda	43 (26)
1980	Footscray	8 (1)
Total		51 (27)
- ^{1} Playing statistics correct to the end of 1980.

Russell Tweeddale (born 27 June 1954) is a former Australian rules footballer who played with St Kilda and Footscray in the Victorian Football League (VFL).

Tweeddale, who was from Ballarat, was a member of Redan's 1975 and 1976 premiership teams. Also a talented basketball player, Tweeddale represented the Victoria Country side at the 1976 Australian Basketball Championships. After starting at St Kilda with the reserves, in 1975, Tweeddale broke into the seniors in the 1977 VFL season. He was one of St Kilda's best players on his league debut and made a total of 17 appearances that year, followed by 17 in 1978 and seven in 1979. Footscray acquired his services in 1980 and he played eight senior games for his new club.
