= Dallas Patterson =

Australian rules footballer (born 1947)

Personal information
- Full name: Dallas Lynn Patterson
- Born: 30 May 1947 (age 79)
- Height: 183 cm (6 ft 0 in)
- Weight: 76 kg (168 lb)

Playing career^{1}
Years	Club	Games (Goals)
1965–68	Footscray	13 (10)
1970–73	Williamstown (VFA)	35 (116)
1974–75	Dandenong (VFA)	6 (12)
- ^{1} Playing statistics correct to the end of 1975.

Dallas Lynn Patterson (born 30 May 1947) is a former Australian rules footballer who played with Footscray in the Victorian Football League (VFL).
