= Ron McGowan =

Australian rules footballer

Personal information
- Full name: Ron McGowan
- Born: 30 November 1945 (age 80)
- Original team: Longford / Hobart
- Height: 185 cm (6 ft 1 in)
- Weight: 86 kg (190 lb)

Playing career^{1}
Years	Club	Games (Goals)
1965–1972	Footscray	92 (2)
- ^{1} Playing statistics correct to the end of 1972.

Ron McGowan (born 30 November 1945) is a former Australian rules footballer who played with Footscray in the Victorian Football League (VFL).

McGowan, a strong marking defender, was recruited from Hobart. Before that he had played for Longford in the Northern Tasmanian Football Association.

He spent eight seasons at Footscray and then finished his career in the South Australian National Football League, playing 21 games with South Adelaide.
