= Ken Lockhart =

Australian rules footballer, born 1913

Personal information
- Full name: Kenneth Samuel Lockhart
- Born: 23 May 1913; Sea Lake, Victoria
- Died: 21 February 2006 (aged 92)
- Original team: Sea Lake

Playing career^{1}
Years	Club	Games (Goals)
1934	Footscray	5 (1)
- ^{1} Playing statistics correct to the end of 1934.

Kenneth Samuel Lockhart (23 May 1913 – 21 February 2006) was an Australian rules footballer who played with Footscray in the Victorian Football League (VFL).
