= Bill Doolan =

Australian rules footballer

Personal information
- Full name: William Patrick Doolan
- Born: 27 July 1895; Undera, Victoria
- Died: 20 November 1963 (aged 68); Footscray, Victoria

Playing career^{1}
Years	Club	Games (Goals)
1925–28	Footscray	44 (2)
- ^{1} Playing statistics correct to the end of 1928.

William Patrick Doolan (27 July 1895 – 20 November 1963) was an Australian rules footballer who played with Footscray in the Victorian Football League (VFL).
