= George Clissold =

Australian rules footballer

Personal information
- Full name: George Gilmour Clissold
- Born: 12 September 1899; Ascot Vale, Victoria
- Died: 19 August 1956 (aged 56); Brighton, Victoria
- Original team: Essendon Reserves

Playing career^{1}
Years	Club	Games (Goals)
1925–26	Footscray	16 (4)
- ^{1} Playing statistics correct to the end of 1926.

George Gilmour Clissold (12 September 1899 – 19 August 1956) was an Australian rules footballer who played with Footscray in the Victorian Football League (VFL).
