= Mark Komp =

Australian rules footballer

Personal information
- Full name: Mark Komp
- Born: 21 March 1959 (age 67)
- Original team: Parkside
- Height: 191 cm (6 ft 3 in)
- Weight: 92 kg (203 lb)

Playing career^{1}
Years	Club	Games (Goals)
1981–82	Footscray	23 (9)
- ^{1} Playing statistics correct to the end of 1982.

Mark Komp (born 21 March 1959) is a former Australian rules footballer who played with Footscray in the Victorian Football League (VFL).
