= Jack Borlase =

Australian rules footballer

Personal information
- Full name: William John Borlase
- Nickname: Jack
- Born: 9 January 1921; Footscray, Victoria
- Died: 26 March 2016 (aged 95)
- Original team: Footscray Tech Old Boys
- Height: 182 cm (6 ft 0 in)
- Weight: 76 kg (168 lb)

Playing career^{1}
Years	Club	Games (Goals)
1941	Footscray	3 (0)
- ^{1} Playing statistics correct to the end of 1941.

William John Borlase (9 January 1921 – 26 March 2016) was an Australian rules footballer who played with Footscray in the Victorian Football League (VFL).

== Personal life ==
Borlase served as a corporal in the Australian Army during the Second World War.
