= John Keast =

Australian rules footballer

Personal information
- Full name: John Keast
- Born: 24 February 1953 (age 73)
- Original team: Morwell
- Height: 192 cm (6 ft 4 in)
- Weight: 89 kg (196 lb)
- Position: Ruck

Playing career^{1}
Years	Club	Games (Goals)
1971, 1973	Footscray	8 (2)
- ^{1} Playing statistics correct to the end of 1973.

John Keast (born 24 February 1953) is a former Australian rules footballer who played with Footscray in the Victorian Football League (VFL).
