= Sid Thompson =

Australian rules footballer, born 1905

Personal information
- Full name: Sid Thompson
- Born: 17 July 1905
- Died: 24 June 1975 (aged 69)

Playing career^{1}
Years	Club	Games (Goals)
1925, 1927	Footscray	10 (5)
- ^{1} Playing statistics correct to the end of 1927.

Sid Thompson (17 July 1905 – 24 June 1975) was a former Australian rules footballer who played with Footscray in the Victorian Football League (VFL).
