= Stan Davidson =

Australian rules footballer

Personal information
- Full name: Stan Davidson
- Born: 26 April 1954 (age 72)
- Original team: Sale
- Height: 177 cm (5 ft 10 in)
- Weight: 76 kg (168 lb)
- Position: Wing / Rover

Playing career^{1}
Years	Club	Games (Goals)
1980–83	Footscray	62 (14)
- ^{1} Playing statistics correct to the end of 1983.

Stan Davidson (born 26 April 1954) is a former Australian rules footballer who played with Footscray in the Victorian Football League (VFL).
