= Tommy McHenry =

Australian rules footballer, born 1903

Personal information
- Full name: James Thomas McHenry
- Born: 2 June 1903; Broomfield, Victoria
- Died: 7 May 1972 (aged 68); Sebastopol, Victoria
- Height: 168 cm (5 ft 6 in)
- Weight: 67 kg (148 lb)

Playing career^{1}
Years	Club	Games (Goals)
1924	Footscray (VFA)	9 (5)
1925–26	Footscray	21 (13)
- ^{1} Playing statistics correct to the end of 1926.

James Thomas McHenry (2 June 1903 – 7 May 1972) was an Australian rules footballer who played with Footscray in both the Victorian Football Association (VFA) and Victorian Football League (VFL).

== Family ==
The son of James Herbert McHenry (1880–1955), and Elsie Mary McHenry (1882–1980), née Reardon, James Thomas McHenry was born at Broomfield, Victoria on 2 June 1903.

He married Julia Winifred Voisey (1907–1939) in 1933.

Tommy's younger brother, Allan Douglas McHenry (1904–1980), married Brownlow Medallist and co-player, Allan Hopkins', sister Gertrude Selina Hopkins (1906–1983) in 1933, making Tommy and Hopkins indirect in-laws.
