= George Savige =

Australian rules footballer

Personal information
- Full name: George Savige
- Born: 15 November 1940
- Original team: Moe
- Height: 178 cm (5 ft 10 in)
- Weight: 75 kg (165 lb)

Playing career^{1}
Years	Club	Games (Goals)
1962	Footscray	4 (0)
- ^{1} Playing statistics correct to the end of 1962.

George Savige (born 15 November 1940) is a former Australian rules footballer who played with Footscray in the Victorian Football League (VFL).

Savige transferred to Williamstown in the VFA in 1963 and played 73 games and kicked 52 goals up until the end of the 1966 season. He played in the centre in the 1964 grand final loss against Port Melbourne and was the leading goalkicker in 1966 with 32 goals. He also won the best first-year player award in 1963. He became coach of Foster in 1967.
