= Carl Vesty =

Australian rules footballer

- Carl Vesty, part of the championship winning 1979 team

Personal information
- Full name: Carl Vesty
- Born: 25 May 1953 (age 73)
- Original team: Morwell
- Height: 170 cm (5 ft 7 in)
- Weight: 71 kg (157 lb)

Playing career^{1}
Years	Club	Games (Goals)
1972–73	Footscray	3 (0)
- ^{1} Playing statistics correct to the end of 1973.

Carl Vesty (born 25 May 1953) is a former Australian rules footballer who played with Footscray in the Victorian Football League (VFL) and Woodville in the South Australian National Football League (SANFL).
