= John Burleigh (footballer) =

Australian rules footballer

Personal information
- Full name: John Burleigh
- Born: 26 September 1950 (age 76)
- Original team: Bairnsdale
- Height: 170 cm (5 ft 7 in)
- Weight: 76 kg (168 lb)

Playing career^{1}
Years	Club	Games (Goals)
1974	Footscray	1 (0)
- ^{1} Playing statistics correct to the end of 1974.

John Burleigh (born 26 September 1950) is a former Australian rules footballer who played with Footscray in the Victorian Football League (VFL).
