= Wally White =

Australian rules footballer, born 1901

Personal information
- Full name: Wally White
- Born: 28 December 1901
- Died: 15 December 1972 (aged 70)

Playing career^{1}
Years	Club	Games (Goals)
1925	Footscray	3 (0)
- ^{1} Playing statistics correct to the end of 1925.

Wally White (28 December 1901 – 15 December 1972) was a former Australian rules footballer who played with Footscray in the Victorian Football League (VFL).
