= Walter Minogue =

Australian rules footballer, born 1910

Personal information
- Full name: Walter Minogue
- Born: 6 April 1910; Broken Hill, New South Wales
- Died: 6 October 1958 (aged 48); Footscray, Victoria
- Original team: South Broken Hill

Playing career^{1}
Years	Club	Games (Goals)
1931–33	Footscray	38 (19)
- ^{1} Playing statistics correct to the end of 1933.

Walter Minogue (6 April 1910 – 6 October 1958) was an Australian rules footballer who played with Footscray in the Victorian Football League (VFL).
