= Bruce Fountain =

Australian rules footballer

Personal information
- Full name: Bruce Fountain
- Born: 23 April 1920
- Died: 14 June 2011 (aged 91)
- Original team: Lindenow
- Height: 185 cm (6 ft 1 in)
- Weight: 86 kg (190 lb)
- Position: Ruck / Defence

Playing career^{1}
Years	Club	Games (Goals)
1946–47	Footscray	23 (1)
- ^{1} Playing statistics correct to the end of 1947.

Bruce Fountain (23 April 1920 – 14 June 2011) was a former Australian rules footballer who played with Footscray in the Victorian Football League (VFL).
