= Bobby Clark (Australian footballer) =

Australian rules footballer

Personal information
- Full name: Bobby Clark
- Born: 28 July 1940 (age 86)
- Original team: University High School
- Height: 173 cm (5 ft 8 in)
- Weight: 67 kg (148 lb)

Playing career^{1}
Years	Club	Games (Goals)
1957–58	Footscray	5 (1)
- ^{1} Playing statistics correct to the end of 1958.

Bobby Clark (born 28 July 1940) is a former Australian rules footballer who played with Footscray in the Victorian Football League (VFL).
