= Vic Mather =

Australian rules footballer

Personal information
- Full name: Vic Mather
- Born: 9 December 1924
- Died: 10 May 2009 (aged 84)
- Original teams: Footscray and District
- Height: 175 cm (5 ft 9 in)
- Weight: 70 kg (154 lb)

Playing career^{1}
Years	Club	Games (Goals)
1945–46	Footscray	4 (0)
- ^{1} Playing statistics correct to the end of 1946.

Vic Mather (9 December 1924 – 10 May 2009) was an Australian rules footballer who played with Footscray in the Victorian Football League (VFL).
