= Bill Godridge =

Australian rules footballer

Personal information
- Full name: Bill Godridge
- Born: 23 April 1950 (age 76)
- Original team: Assumption College
- Height: 180 cm (5 ft 11 in)
- Weight: 79 kg (174 lb)

Playing career^{1}
Years	Club	Games (Goals)
1970–72	Footscray	12 (5)
- ^{1} Playing statistics correct to the end of 1972.

Bill Godridge (born 23 April 1950) is a former Australian rules footballer who played with Footscray in the Victorian Football League (VFL).
