= Archie Whitfield =

Australian rules footballer, born 1900

Personal information
- Full name: Archibald John Frederick Whitfield
- Born: 3 March 1900; North Melbourne, Victoria
- Died: 30 June 1952 (aged 52); Parkville, Victoria
- Original team: Sunshine

Playing career^{1}
Years	Club	Games (Goals)
1927	Footscray	1 (2)
- ^{1} Playing statistics correct to the end of 1927.

Archibald John Frederick Whitfield (3 March 1900 – 30 June 1952) was an Australian rules footballer who played for the Footscray Football Club in the Victorian Football League (VFL).
