= Terry Wilkins (footballer) =

Australian rules footballer

Personal information
- Full name: Terry Wilkins
- Born: 4 July 1953 (age 73)
- Original team: West Footscray
- Height: 178 cm (5 ft 10 in)
- Weight: 71.5 kg (158 lb)

Playing career^{1}
Years	Club	Games (Goals)
1973–74	Footscray	20 (1)
1975–76	Melbourne	14 (2)
Total		34 (3)
- ^{1} Playing statistics correct to the end of 1976.

Terry Wilkins (born 4 July 1953) is a former Australian rules footballer who played with Footscray and Melbourne in the Victorian Football League (VFL).
