= Rupe Hopkins =

Australian rules footballer, born 1900

Personal information
- Full name: Rupert John Hopkins
- Born: 5 April 1900; Footscray, Victoria
- Died: 6 April 1973 (aged 73); Essendon, Victoria

Playing career^{1}
Years	Club	Games (Goals)
1926	Footscray	1 (0)
- ^{1} Playing statistics correct to the end of 1926.

Rupert John Hopkins (5 April 1900 – 6 April 1973) was an Australian rules footballer who played with Footscray in the Victorian Football League (VFL). He was the older brother of Brownlow Medallist Allan Hopkins.

A key forward, Hopkins joined Footscray from VJFA club Yarraville in 1926. He impressed with eight goals in a practice match that year, and played in Footscray's round 1 team after being named emergency, but never gained senior selection again and returned to Yarraville.
