= Ron Howard (Australian footballer) =

Australian rules footballer

Ronald John Howard

Personal information
- Born: 18 January 1940 (age 86)
- Died: 29 January 2023; Melbourne, Victoria
- Height: 180 cm (5 ft 11 in)
- Weight: 75 kg (165 lb)

Playing career^{1}
Years	Club	Games (Goals)
1958–60	Footscray	30 (22)
- ^{1} Playing statistics correct to the end of 1960.

Ron Howard (18 January 1940 – 29 January 2023) was an Australian rules footballer who played with Footscray in the Victorian Football League (VFL).
