= Ray Whitzell =

Australian rules footballer

Personal information
- Full name: Raymond Whitzell
- Born: 28 September 1940
- Died: 26 April 2017 (aged 76)
- Original team: Footscray Thirds
- Height: 196 cm (6 ft 5 in)
- Weight: 85 kg (187 lb)

Playing career^{1}
Years	Club	Games (Goals)
1960	Footscray	3 (0)
- ^{1} Playing statistics correct to the end of 1960.

Ray Whitzell (28 September 1940 – 26 April 2017) was an Australian rules footballer who played for the Footscray Football Club in the Victorian Football League (VFL).
