= Jack Gibby =

Australian rules footballer

Personal information
- Full name: John Leonard Gibby
- Born: 17 October 1920; Kew, Victoria
- Died: 21 October 1971 (aged 51); Fitzroy, Victoria
- Original team: Kew CYMS (CYMSFA)
- Height: 183 cm (6 ft 0 in)
- Weight: 83 kg (183 lb)

Playing career^{1}
Years	Club	Games (Goals)
1942	Footscray	5 (6)
- ^{1} Playing statistics correct to the end of 1942.

John Leonard Gibby (17 October 1920 – 21 October 1971) was an Australian rules footballer who played with Footscray in the Victorian Football League (VFL).

== Family ==
The son of John Gibby (1889–1961), and Mary Elizabeth "Maie" Gibby (1893–1976), née Dodd, John Leonard Gibby was born at Kew, Victoria on 17 October 1920.

He married Margaret Catherine "Peg" Ryan (1919–?) in 1946.

== Football ==
=== Footscray (VFL) ===
Having played in a number of Second XVIII matches earlier in the season, he played in five consecutive First XVIII matches for Footscray in 1942: the first, against St Kilda, at the Yarravile Oval, on 11 July 1942, and the last, against Hawthorn, at the Yarravile Oval, on 8 August 1942.

== Military service ==
He enlisted in the RAAF on 9 October 1942, served overseas, and was discharged on 6 December 1945.

== Death ==
He died on 21 October 1971.
