= Vin Morrissey =

Australian rules footballer

Personal information
- Full name: Vincent Edward Morrissey
- Born: 12 August 1925
- Died: 25 December 2012 (aged 87)
- Original team: Essendon District
- Height: 180 cm (5 ft 11 in)
- Weight: 81 kg (179 lb)

Playing career^{1}
Years	Club	Games (Goals)
1948–49	Footscray	13 (0)
- ^{1} Playing statistics correct to the end of 1949.

Vincent Edward Morrissey (12 August 1925 – 25 December 2012) was an Australian rules footballer who played with Footscray in the Victorian Football League (VFL).
