= Bill Kelly (footballer, born 1930) =

Australian rules footballer

Personal information
- Full name: William Ernest Kelly
- Born: 1 June 1930
- Died: 16 August 2015 (aged 85)
- Original team: Lockington
- Height: 178 cm (5 ft 10 in)
- Weight: 71 kg (157 lb)

Playing career^{1}
Years	Club	Games (Goals)
1950	Footscray	7 (1)
- ^{1} Playing statistics correct to the end of 1950.

William Ernest Kelly (1 June 1930 – 16 August 2015) was an Australian rules footballer who played with Footscray in the Victorian Football League (VFL).
