= Laurie Walsh =

Australian rules footballer

Personal information
- Full name: Lawrence Walsh
- Born: 16 February 1948 (age 78)
- Original team: Sunshine YCW
- Height: 177 cm (5 ft 10 in)
- Weight: 68 kg (150 lb)

Playing career^{1}
Years	Club	Games (Goals)
1967	Footscray	3 (1)
- ^{1} Playing statistics correct to the end of 1967.

Laurie Walsh (born 16 February 1948) is a former Australian rules footballer who played with Footscray in the Victorian Football League (VFL). Jumper number 41.
