= Tom McMahon (footballer, born 1918) =

Australian rules footballer, born 1918

Personal information
- Full name: Thomas Joseph McMahon
- Born: 28 July 1918; Melbourne, Victoria
- Died: 24 September 2005 (aged 87)
- Height: 177 cm (5 ft 10 in)
- Weight: 71 kg (157 lb)

Playing career^{1}
Years	Club	Games (Goals)
1943	Footscray	2 (0)
- ^{1} Playing statistics correct to the end of 1943.

Thomas Joseph McMahon (28 July 1918 – 24 September 2005) was an Australian rules footballer who played with Footscray in the Victorian Football League (VFL).

== War service ==
Thomas Joseph McMahon enlisted to serve in the Australian Army in World War II in January 1940.

== Football career ==
McMahon played two senior VFL games for Footscray in 1943, against Essendon and St Kilda. After Footscray played Essendon, the local South Melbourne newspaper reported “Tom McMahon gave a sound display on the wing. Close on 6 ft., well-built and very fast (he appeared at Stawell), McMahon was born in Draper Street and served his apprenticeship in the printing department of 'The Record' Office.”

In 1944 McMahon joined his local side, South Melbourne, but did not make a senior appearance, only making the supplementary list in 1945. He subsequently applied to join Prahran in the Victorian Football Association. Although not granted a clearance by South, by June 1945 McMahon was playing with Prahran. In 1947, McMahon was appointed acting captain of the Prahran side when Keith Stackpole was injured in what was to be his final year of senior football.

== Sprinting career ==
McMahon was an accomplished sprinter, competing in the Stawell Gift in 1940 and 1941, but failed to make it past the heat stage.

In 1946, McMahon won his heat at Stawell but failed to make the final after finished second to Jim Baird in his semi-final.

== Personal life ==
In November 1944 Tom McMahon married Phyllis Mary Mullins. He worked in the printing industry and lived in the Melbourne suburb of Brighton for most of his life.

Thomas Joseph McMahon died at the age of 87 in 2005.
