= Glen Sampson =

Australian rules footballer

Personal information
- Full name: Glen Sampson
- Born: 7 March 1960 (age 66)
- Original team: South Melbourne Reserves
- Height: 179 cm (5 ft 10 in)
- Weight: 73 kg (161 lb)

Playing career^{1}
Years	Club	Games (Goals)
1980	Footscray	6 (1)
- ^{1} Playing statistics correct to the end of 1980.

Glen Sampson (born 7 March 1960) is a former Australian rules footballer who played with Footscray in the Victorian Football League (VFL).
