= Kelvin Payne =

Australian rules footballer

Personal information
- Full name: Kelvin Arthur Payne
- Born: 15 February 1939
- Original team: Alexandra
- Height: 188 cm (6 ft 2 in)
- Weight: 86 kg (190 lb)

Playing career^{1}
Years	Club	Games (Goals)
1957–59, 1963–64	Footscray	35 (5)
- ^{1} Playing statistics correct to the end of 1964.

Kelvin Arthur Payne (born 15 February 1939) is a former Australian rules footballer who played with Footscray in the Victorian Football League (VFL).
