= Jack Somerville (footballer) =

Australian rules footballer, born 1911

Personal information
- Full name: John Edward Somerville
- Born: 14 August 1911; Lindenow, Victoria
- Died: 2 December 1999 (aged 88)
- Original team: Stratford

Playing career^{1}
Years	Club	Games (Goals)
1933–34	Footscray	10 (1)
- ^{1} Playing statistics correct to the end of 1934.

John Edward Somerville (14 August 1911 – 2 December 1999) was an Australian rules footballer who played with Footscray in the Victorian Football League (VFL).
