= Gerry Matheson =

Australian rules footballer, born 1904

Personal information
- Full name: Gerald Pressley Matheson
- Born: 27 August 1904; Sydney, New South Wales
- Died: 13 April 1964 (aged 59); Heidelberg, Victoria

Playing career^{1}
Years	Club	Games (Goals)
1928	Footscray	16 (13)
- ^{1} Playing statistics correct to the end of 1928.

Gerald Pressley Matheson (27 August 1904 – 13 April 1964) was an Australian rules footballer who played with Footscray in the Victorian Football League (VFL).

He later served in the Australian Army for five years during World War II.
