= Norm Edwards =

Australian rules footballer

Personal information
- Full name: Norm Edwards
- Born: 23 October 1928
- Original team: West Footscray
- Height: 187 cm (6 ft 2 in)
- Weight: 86 kg (190 lb)

Playing career^{1}
| Years | Club | Games (Goals) |
| 1950–51 | Footscray | 3 (1) |
- ^{1} Playing statistics correct to the end of 1951.

Norm Edwards (born 23 October 1928) is a former Australian rules footballer who played with Footscray in the Victorian Football League (VFL).
