= Lee Perussich =

Australian rules footballer

Personal information
- Full name: Lee Perussich
- Born: 18 November 1955 (age 70)
- Height: 175 cm (5 ft 9 in)
- Weight: 72 kg (159 lb)

Playing career^{1}
Years	Club	Games (Goals)
1975–79	Footscray	45 (12)
- ^{1} Playing statistics correct to the end of 1979.

Lee Perussich (born 18 November 1955) is a former Australian rules footballer who played with Footscray in the Victorian Football League (VFL).
