= Matt Johnson (Australian footballer) =

Australian rules footballer

Personal information
- Full name: Matt Johnson
- Born: 9 March 1959 (age 67)
- Original team: Berwick
- Height: 187 cm (6 ft 2 in)
- Weight: 82 kg (181 lb)
- Position: Utility

Playing career^{1}
Years	Club	Games (Goals)
1977–78, 1980–81	Footscray	8 (4)
- ^{1} Playing statistics correct to the end of 1981.

Matt Johnson (born 9 March 1959) is a former Australian rules footballer who played with Footscray in the Victorian Football League (VFL).
