= Dick Wilkinson =

Australian rules footballer, born 1903

Personal information
- Full name: Dick Wilkinson
- Born: 21 January 1903
- Died: 20 September 1976 (aged 73)
- Original team: Woodend

Playing career^{1}
| Years | Club | Games (Goals) |
| 1926 | Footscray | 2 (1) |
- ^{1} Playing statistics correct to the end of 1926.

Dick Wilkinson (21 January 1903 – 20 September 1976) was an Australian rules footballer who played with Footscray in the Victorian Football League (VFL).
