= Ted Burgess =

Australian rules footballer

Personal information
- Full name: Ted Burgess
- Born: 11 February 1945
- Original team: Lalor
- Height: 180 cm (5 ft 11 in)
- Weight: 76 kg (168 lb)

Playing career^{1}
Years	Club	Games (Goals)
1966	Footscray	5 (0)
- ^{1} Playing statistics correct to the end of 1966.

Ted Burgess (born 11 February 1945) is a former Australian rules footballer who played with Footscray in the Victorian Football League (VFL).
