= Bert Connolly =

Australian rules footballer

Personal information
- Full name: Herbert Allan Connolly
- Born: 12 January 1928
- Died: 10 July 1998 (aged 70)
- Original team: Stanhope / Werribee
- Height: 188 cm (6 ft 2 in)
- Weight: 87 kg (192 lb)

Playing career^{1}
Years	Club	Games (Goals)
1951–1952	Footscray	11 (0)
- ^{1} Playing statistics correct to the end of 1952.

Herbert Allan Connolly (12 January 1928 – 10 July 1998) was an Australian rules footballer who played for the Footscray Football Club in the Victorian Football League (VFL).
