= Rowley Flynne =

Australian rules footballer, born 1913

Personal information
- Full name: Ralton Ashton Flynne
- Born: 12 January 1913; Coburg, Victoria
- Died: 20 August 2003 (aged 90)
- Original teams: Church of Christ, Windsor
- Height: 178 cm (5 ft 10 in)
- Weight: 83 kg (183 lb)

Playing career^{1}
Years	Club	Games (Goals)
1935	South Melbourne	4 (0)
1937	Footscray	9 (0)
Total		13 (0)
- ^{1} Playing statistics correct to the end of 1937.

Ralton Ashton "Rowley" Flynne (12 January 1913 – 20 August 2003) was an Australian rules footballer who played with South Melbourne and Footscray in the Victorian Football League (VFL).

Fynne played his early football for the Church of Christ in Windsor. He made four league appearances for South Melbourne in the 1935 VFL season. The club made the grand final that season, but Flynne didn't take part in the finals series. He played for Sunshine in 1936 and was a member of their premiership team, before returning to the VFL the following year, with Footscray.
