= Roy Rodwell =

Australian rules footballer, born 1908

Personal information
- Full name: Roy Rodwell
- Born: 9 November 1908
- Died: 8 March 1979 (aged 70)
- Original team: Oakleigh
- Height: 179 cm (5 ft 10 in)
- Weight: 76 kg (168 lb)
- Position: Defence

Playing career^{1}
Years	Club	Games (Goals)
1932–35	Footscray	51 (27)
- ^{1} Playing statistics correct to the end of 1935.

Roy Rodwell (9 November 1908 – 8 March 1979) was an Australian rules footballer who played with Footscray in the Victorian Football League (VFL).
