= Wal Johnson =

Australian rules footballer, born 1913

Personal information
- Full name: Walter Johnson
- Born: 23 October 1913; Yarraville, Victoria
- Died: 7 September 1999 (aged 85)
- Original team: Footscray Tech Old Boys

Playing career^{1}
Years	Club	Games (Goals)
1936	Footscray	1 (0)
- ^{1} Playing statistics correct to the end of 1936.

Walter Johnson (23 October 1913 – 7 September 1999) was an Australian rules footballer who played with Footscray in the Victorian Football League (VFL).
