= Tom Mullens =

Australian rules footballer, born 1900

Personal information
- Full name: Thomas Patrick Mullens
- Born: 13 April 1900; Ballarat East, Victoria
- Died: 4 August 1961 (aged 61); Footscray, Victoria
- Height: 180 cm (5 ft 11 in)
- Weight: 71 kg (157 lb)

Playing career^{1}
Years	Club	Games (Goals)
1923–24	Footscray (VFA)	36 (97)
1925	Footscray	7 (11)
1926	Carlton	7 (10)
Total		50 (118)
- ^{1} Playing statistics correct to the end of 1926.

Thomas Patrick Mullens (13 April 1900 – 4 August 1961) was an Australian rules footballer who played with Carlton and Footscray in the Victorian Football League (VFL).
