= Bernie Smallwood =

Australian rules footballer

Personal information
- Full name: Bernard Albert Smallwood
- Born: 22 December 1927
- Died: 28 September 2017 (aged 89)
- Original team: Yarraville
- Height: 189 cm (6 ft 2 in)
- Weight: 84 kg (185 lb)

Playing career^{1}
Years	Club	Games (Goals)
1950–1952	Footscray	13 (4)
- ^{1} Playing statistics correct to the end of 1952.

Bernard Albert Smallwood (22 December 1927 – 28 September 2017) was an Australian rules footballer who played for the Footscray Football Club in the Victorian Football League (VFL).
