= Norm McDonald (footballer, born 1898) =

Australian rules footballer (1898–1976)

Personal information
- Full name: Norman McDonald
- Born: 3 May 1898; Williamstown, Victoria
- Died: 31 January 1976 (aged 77); Footscray, Victoria
- Original team: Williamstown
- Height: 168 cm (5 ft 6 in)
- Weight: 63 kg (139 lb)

Playing career^{1}
Years	Club	Games (Goals)
1919–25	Williamstown (VFA)	72 (71)
1925–28	Footscray	51 (67)
1929–32	Williamstown (VFA)	37 (59)
- ^{1} Playing statistics correct to the end of 1932.

Norman McDonald (3 May 1898 – 31 January 1976) was an Australian rules footballer who played with Footscray in the Victorian Football League (VFL) and Williamstown in the Victorian Football Association (VFA).
