= Ron Pocock =

Australian rules footballer and horse breeder/trainer

Personal information
- Full name: Ronald James Pocock
- Born: 13 June 1928
- Died: 15 January 2012 (aged 83); Bendigo, Victoria
- Original team: Sunshine
- Height: 178 cm (5 ft 10 in)
- Weight: 81 kg (179 lb)

Playing career^{1}
Years	Club	Games (Goals)
1949	Footscray	1 (0)
- ^{1} Playing statistics correct to the end of 1949.

Ron Pocock (13 June 1928 – 15 January 2012) was a harness racing horse breeder and trainer, who also played Australian rules football with Footscray in the Victorian Football League (VFL).
