= Robert Evans (Australian footballer) =

Australian rules footballer (1960–2024)

Personal information
- Born: 1 July 1960
- Died: 9 February 2024 (aged 63)
- Original team: Tullamarine (EDFL)
- Height: 185 cm (6 ft 1 in)
- Weight: 86 kg (190 lb)

Playing career
| Years | Club | Games (Goals) |
| 1984−1990 | Coburg | 97 |
| 1986 | Footscray | 1 (0) |
| 1991 | Subiaco | 14 (0) |

Robert Evans (1 July 1960 − 9 February 2024) was an Australian rules footballer who played with Coburg in the Victorian Football Association. He also played a single game for Footscray in the Victorian Football League.

== Football career ==
Evans joined Coburg in 1984, and was the club's best-and-fairest winner in his second season in 1985. Although originally a full-forward, he was later moved to full-back by coach Phil Cleary. Evans missed Coburg's 1988 premiership due to suspension, but he was part of the winning 1989 team.

Evans left Coburg in 1991 to join West Australian Football League club Subiaco, playing 14 games.

Evans returned to Coburg in 1998 as president, and was credited with saving the club from going under by orchestrating an alignment with Australian Football League club Richmond in 2001.

== Death ==
Evans died after a lengthy battle with cancer on 9 February 2024, at the age of 63.
