= Norm Woodman =

Australian rules footballer, born 1902

Personal information
- Full name: Norm Woodman
- Born: 27 July 1902
- Died: 20 July 1968 (aged 65)
- Original team: Footscray (VFA)

Playing career^{1}
Years	Club	Games (Goals)
1928–30	Footscray	38 (8)
- ^{1} Playing statistics correct to the end of 1930.

Norm Woodman (27 July 1902 – 20 July 1968) was an Australian rules footballer who played with Footscray in the Victorian Football League (VFL).
