= Phil Fleming =

Australian rules footballer

Personal information
- Full name: Phil Fleming
- Born: 18 September 1957 (age 69)
- Original team: St Pat's / Sale
- Height: 177 cm (5 ft 10 in)
- Weight: 75 kg (165 lb)

Playing career^{1}
Years	Club	Games (Goals)
1977	Footscray	3 (0)
- ^{1} Playing statistics correct to the end of 1977.

Phil Fleming (born 18 September 1957) is a former Australian rules footballer who played with Footscray in the Victorian Football League (VFL).

He played in the Footscray Reserves grand final against Richmond at the MCG (Melbourne Cricket Ground) in 1977.

In 1978 and 1979 Fleming played at Yallourn/Yallourn North Football Club in the Latrobe Valley league. He was named in team of the century in 2019.
