= Bob Cockerell =

Australian rules footballer

Personal information
- Full name: Bob Cockerell
- Born: 5 November 1951 (age 74)
- Original team: Footscray Fourths
- Height: 175 cm (5 ft 9 in)
- Weight: 76 kg (168 lb)

Playing career^{1}
Years	Club	Games (Goals)
1971–72	Footscray	21 (11)
- ^{1} Playing statistics correct to the end of 1972.

Bob Cockerell (born 5 November 1951) is a former Australian rules footballer who played with Footscray in the Victorian Football League (VFL).
