= Morrie Hutcheson =

Australian rules footballer

Personal information
- Full name: Morris James Hutcheson
- Born: 19 February 1928
- Died: 16 July 2016 (aged 88); Bendigo, Victoria
- Original team: Waratahs
- Height: 180 cm (5 ft 11 in)
- Weight: 73 kg (161 lb)

Playing career^{1}
Years	Club	Games (Goals)
1950	Footscray	5 (0)
- ^{1} Playing statistics correct to the end of 1950.

Morris James Hutcheson (19 February 1928 – 16 July 2016) was an Australian rules footballer who played with Footscray in the Victorian Football League (VFL).
