= Cyril Cooper =

Australian rules footballer, born 1914

Personal information
- Full name: Cyril Cooper
- Born: 7 April 1914
- Died: 7 January 2002 (aged 87)
- Original team: Williamstown District
- Height: 191 cm (6 ft 3 in)
- Weight: 85 kg (187 lb)

Playing career^{1}
Years	Club	Games (Goals)
1937	Footscray	1 (0)
- ^{1} Playing statistics correct to the end of 1937.

Cyril Cooper (7 April 1914 – 7 January 2002) was a former Australian rules footballer who played with Footscray in the Victorian Football League (VFL).
