= Alan Stoneham =

Australian rules footballer, born 1955

Personal information
- Born: 20 August 1955 (age 71)
- Original team: Sunshine (VFA)
- Height: 185 cm (6 ft 1 in)
- Weight: 83 kg (183 lb)

Playing career^{1}
| Years | Club | Games (Goals) |
| 1972 | Sunshine | 9 (18) |
| 1972–1979 | Footscray | 128 (42) |
| 1980–1983 | Essendon | 72 (20) |
| Total | | 209 (80) |
- ^{1} Playing statistics correct to the end of 1983.

Alan Stoneham (born 20 August 1955) is a former Australian rules footballer who played for Footscray and Essendon in the Victorian Football League.

== Footscray career ==
Raised in the famous footballing suburb of Braybrook, Stoneham played junior football for Sunshine in the Victorian Football Association (VFA) before his recruitment by Footscray at 16 in 1972." Cited as a prodigy, great things were expected of Stoneham and he was rewarded with Footscary legend Ted Whitten's number three guernsey.

Playing as a versatile centreman or occasionally up forward, Stoneham was a highly talented player yet his career never seemed to match the expectations Footscray recruiters and supporters had of him. During the mid 1970s Footscray made the finals only twice yet failed to win on either occasion, and the club endured numerous departures of highly talented players in this period.

== Essendon career ==
In 1980 Stoneham transferred to Essendon, securing a solid spot as a defender under coaches Barry Davis and Kevin Sheedy. During the 1983 VFL season, he was involved in a controversial incident against Hawthorn with Hawthorn star Robert DiPierdomenico where Stoneham was concussed after the half time siren, and assisted from the field with a black eye. He ended his career later that year, captaining a victorious Essendon reserves side to a premiership.

Stoneham played 128 games with Footscray and a further 78 with Essendon, for a total of 200 senior games, kicking 62 goals.
