= Lionel Ollington =

Australian rules footballer

Personal information
- Full name: Lionel Vivian Ollington
- Born: 19 December 1927; Smithton, Tasmania
- Died: 23 May 2014 (aged 86)
- Original team: Montague Rovers
- Height: 173 cm (5 ft 8 in)
- Weight: 64 kg (141 lb)

Playing career^{1}
Years	Club	Games (Goals)
1953	Footscray	5 (3)
- ^{1} Playing statistics correct to the end of 1953.

Lionel Vivian "Nappy" Ollington (19 December 1927 – 23 May 2014) was an Australian rules footballer who played with Footscray in the Victorian Football League (VFL).

He was later known as an organizer and promoter of the traditional Australian gambling game Two-up. He was operating outside the law for two decades but eventually permitted to hold legal games annually on Anzac Day. The traditional Anzac Day two up games at Flemington Racetrack are being continued by Lionel Ollington's son.
