= Ray Broadway =

Australian rules footballer

Personal information
- Full name: Ray Broadway
- Born: 26 January 1938
- Died: 17 January 2015 (aged 76)
- Height: 178 cm (5 ft 10 in)
- Weight: 79 kg (174 lb)

Playing career^{1}
Years	Club	Games (Goals)
1956, 1958	Footscray	13 (0)
1959	South Melbourne	3 (0)
Total		16 (0)
- ^{1} Playing statistics correct to the end of 1959.

Ray Broadway (26 January 1938 – 17 January 2015) was an Australian rules footballer who played with Footscray and South Melbourne in the Victorian Football League (VFL).
