= Pat Cahill (footballer) =

Australian rules footballer (1919–1966)

Personal information
- Full name: Patrick Thomas Cahill
- Born: 25 July 1919; Midland, Western Australia
- Died: 24 November 1966 (aged 47); Heidelberg, Victoria
- Original team: Williamstown
- Height: 188 cm (6 ft 2 in)
- Weight: 83 kg (183 lb)
- Position: Ruck / Defence

Playing career^{1}
Years	Club	Games (Goals)
1939–41, 1943–44, 1946–47	Footscray	47 (19)
1948	St Kilda	3 (2)
Total		50 (21)
- ^{1} Playing statistics correct to the end of 1948.

Patrick Thomas Cahill (25 July 1919 – 24 November 1966) was an Australian rules footballer who played with Footscray and St Kilda in the Victorian Football League (VFL). Prior to playing with Footscray, the 18 year old Cahill spent the 1938 season with Williamstown in the VFA where he played 11 games, kicked 6 goals and was awarded the best first-year player trophy. After playing in round one of the 1939 season, Cahill crossed to Footscray without a clearance. He was the younger brother of Ted Cahill, who had also played for Footscray in 1927–28 and Williamstown 1929–34.
