= Bill Harrington (Australian footballer) =

Australian rules footballer

Personal information
- Full name: William Harrington
- Born: 15 January 1942
- Original team: West Footscray
- Height: 188 cm (6 ft 2 in)
- Weight: 86 kg (190 lb)
- Position: Ruck

Playing career^{1}
Years	Club	Games (Goals)
1962–63	Footscray	21 (10)
- ^{1} Playing statistics correct to the end of 1963.

William Harrington (born 15 January 1942) is a former Australian rules footballer who played with Footscray in the Victorian Football League (VFL).

Harrington played with Albury in 1964.
