= Fred Ulbrick =

Australian rules footballer

Personal information
- Full name: Frederick Joseph Ulbrick
- Born: 8 August 1894; Burramine, Victoria
- Died: 6 January 1964 (aged 69); Heidelberg, Victoria
- Original team: Lefroy

Playing career^{1}
Years	Club	Games (Goals)
1925, 1927	Footscray	7 (0)
- ^{1} Playing statistics correct to the end of 1927.

Frederick Joseph Ulbrick (8 August 1894 – 6 January 1964) was an Australian rules footballer who played with Footscray in the Victorian Football League (VFL).
