= Len Cumming =

Australian rules footballer

Personal information
- Full name: Len Cumming
- Born: 24 April 1949 (age 77)
- Original team: Mildura Imperials
- Height: 178 cm (5 ft 10 in)
- Weight: 72 kg (159 lb)

Playing career^{1}
Years	Club	Games (Goals)
1967–69	Footscray	18 (9)
- ^{1} Playing statistics correct to the end of 1969.

Len Cumming (born 24 April 1949) is a former Australian rules footballer who played with Footscray in the Victorian Football League (VFL).
