= Bill McTaggart =

Australian rules footballer

Personal information
- Full name: Bill McTaggart
- Born: 23 February 1921
- Died: 22 December 2009 (aged 88)
- Original team: Williamstown District
- Height: 178 cm (5 ft 10 in)
- Weight: 75 kg (165 lb)

Playing career^{1}
Years	Club	Games (Goals)
1943–45	Footscray	47 (56)
1947	South Melbourne	1 (0)
Total		48 (56)
- ^{1} Playing statistics correct to the end of 1947.

Bill McTaggart (23 February 1921 – 22 December 2009) was a former Australian rules footballer who played with Footscray and South Melbourne in the Victorian Football League (VFL).
