= Andrew Pollett =

Australian rules footballer

Personal information
- Full name: Andrew William Pollett
- Born: 12 March 1960 (age 66)
- Original team: Sale
- Height: 192 cm (6 ft 4 in)
- Weight: 80 kg (176 lb)

Playing career^{1}
Years	Club	Games (Goals)
1980	Footscray	2 (0)
- ^{1} Playing statistics correct to the end of 1980.

Andrew William Pollett (born 12 March 1960) is a former Australian rules footballer who played for the Footscray Football Club in the Victorian Football League (VFL).
