= Ralph Thomas (Australian footballer) =

Australian rules footballer

Personal information
- Full name: Ralph Thomas
- Born: 7 March 1952 (age 74)
- Original team: Traralgon
- Height: 189 cm (6 ft 2 in)
- Weight: 86 kg (190 lb)

Playing career^{1}
Years	Club	Games (Goals)
1972	Footscray	6 (0)
- ^{1} Playing statistics correct to the end of 1972.

Ralph Thomas (born 7 March 1952) is a former Australian rules footballer who played with Footscray in the Victorian Football League (VFL).
