= Barrie Kerr =

Australian rules footballer

Personal information
- Full name: Barrie Kerr
- Born: 30 January 1938 (age 88)
- Height: 188 cm (6 ft 2 in)
- Weight: 83 kg (183 lb)

Playing career^{1}
Years	Club	Games (Goals)
1957–1959	Footscray	27 (20)
- ^{1} Playing statistics correct to the end of 1959.

Barrie Kerr (born 30 January 1938) is a former Australian rules footballer who played for the Footscray Football Club in the Victorian Football League (VFL).
