= Charlie Pagnoccolo =

Australian rules footballer

Charles Pagnoccolo

Personal information
- Full name: Charles Pagnoccolo
- Born: 25 March 1951 (age 75)
- Original team: Werribee Imperials
- Height: 173 cm (5 ft 8 in)
- Weight: 69 kg (152 lb)

Playing career^{1}
Years	Club	Games (Goals)
1970–73	Footscray	47 (51)
1974	Melbourne	1 (0)
1975–80	Oakleigh (VFA)	13 (23)
1981–83	Mordialloc (VFA)	28 (50)
- ^{1} Playing statistics correct to the end of 1983.

Charles Pagnoccolo (born 25 March 1951) is a former Australian rules footballer who played with Footscray and Melbourne in the Victorian Football League (VFL).
