= Frank McRae (footballer) =

Australian rules footballer (1927–2007)

Personal information
- Full name: James Francis McRae
- Born: 3 August 1927
- Died: 2007 (aged 79–80)
- Original team: Wonthaggi
- Height: 183 cm (6 ft 0 in)
- Weight: 86 kg (190 lb)

Playing career^{1}
Years	Club	Games (Goals)
1950–54	Footscray	45 (6)
- ^{1} Playing statistics correct to the end of 1954.

Frank McRae (3 August 1927 – 2007) was an Australian rules footballer who played with Footscray in the Victorian Football League (VFL).
