= Rob Taylor (Australian footballer) =

Australian rules footballer

Personal information
- Full name: Rob Taylor
- Born: 21 March 1945
- Died: 28 November 2015 (aged 70)
- Original team: Nagambie
- Height: 178 cm (5 ft 10 in)
- Weight: 73 kg (161 lb)

Playing career^{1}
| Years | Club | Games (Goals) |
| 1964–65 | Footscray | 13 (0) |
- ^{1} Playing statistics correct to the end of 1965.

Rob Taylor (21 March 1945 – 28 November 2015 ) was an Australian rules footballer who played with Footscray in the Victorian Football League (VFL).
