= Ray Stamp =

Australian rules footballer

Personal information
- Full name: Ray Stamp
- Born: 12 September 1950 (age 76)
- Original team: Sale
- Height: 180 cm (5 ft 11 in)
- Weight: 76 kg (168 lb)

Playing career^{1}
Years	Club	Games (Goals)
1972	Footscray	6 (3)
- ^{1} Playing statistics correct to the end of 1972.

Ray Stamp (born 12 September 1950) is a former Australian rules footballer who played with Footscray in the Victorian Football League (VFL).

Stamp's first game was round five for Footscray, who played Hawthorn at Glenferry Road Hawthorn. He kicked two goals that day with his first two kicks, one in the first quarter and one in the second.
