= Col Witney =

Australian rules footballer

Personal information
- Full name: Colin Campbell Rosoman Witney
- Born: 11 January 1920; Jeparit, Victoria
- Died: 1 September 2009 (aged 89)
- Original team: Hopetoun / Woomelang
- Height: 179 cm (5 ft 10 in)
- Weight: 80 kg (176 lb)

Playing career^{1}
Years	Club	Games (Goals)
1945	Footscray	5 (0)
- ^{1} Playing statistics correct to the end of 1945.

Colin Campbell Rosoman Witney (11 January 1920 – 1 September 2009) was an Australian rules footballer who played with Footscray in the Victorian Football League (VFL).
