= Don Rawson =

Australian rules footballer

Personal information
- Full name: Don Rawson
- Born: 13 January 1937
- Height: 178 cm (5 ft 10 in)
- Weight: 76 kg (168 lb)

Playing career^{1}
Years	Club	Games (Goals)
1956–57	Footscray	18 (0)
- ^{1} Playing statistics correct to the end of 1957.

Don Rawson (born 13 January 1937) is a former Australian rules footballer who played with Footscray in the Victorian Football League (VFL).
