= Marty Phelan =

Australian rules footballer, born 1916

Personal information
- Full name: Martin Francis Phelan
- Born: 5 August 1916; Footscray, Victoria
- Died: 29 December 1974 (aged 58); Sunshine, Victoria
- Original team: West CYMS (CYMSFA)
- Height: 170 cm (5 ft 7 in)
- Weight: 63 kg (139 lb)

Playing career^{1}
Years	Club	Games (Goals)
1935	Footscray	3 (0)
1939	Williamstown (VFA)	6 (0)
- ^{1} Playing statistics correct to the end of 1939.

Martin Francis Phelan (5 August 1916 – 29 December 1974) was an Australian rules footballer who played with Footscray in the Victorian Football League (VFL).
