= Albert Barker =

Australian rules footballer, born 1901

Personal information
- Full name: Albert Edward Barker
- Born: 16 September 1901; Woodend, Victoria
- Died: 20 December 1961 (aged 60); Melbourne, Victoria
- Original team: Sunshine

Playing career^{1}
Years	Club	Games (Goals)
1929	Footscray	2 (0)
- ^{1} Playing statistics correct to the end of 1929.

Albert Edward Barker (16 September 1901 – 20 December 1961) was an Australian rules footballer who played for the Footscray Football Club in the Victorian Football League (VFL).
