= Ian Wickson =

Australian rules footballer

Personal information
- Full name: Ian Wickson
- Born: 19 April 1955
- Died: 24 July 2012 (aged 57)
- Original team: Altona North / Brooklyn
- Height: 188 cm (6 ft 2 in)
- Weight: 82 kg (181 lb)

Playing career^{1}
Years	Club	Games (Goals)
1973	Footscray	2 (0)
- ^{1} Playing statistics correct to the end of 1973.

Ian Wickson (19 April 1955 – 24 July 2012) was a former Australian rules footballer who played with Footscray in the Victorian Football League (VFL).
