= Mick Egan =

Australian rules footballer

Personal information
- Full name: Mick Egan
- Born: 18 February 1958 (age 68)
- Original team: Kingsville YMCA
- Height: 175 cm (5 ft 9 in)
- Weight: 74 kg (163 lb)
- Position: Back pocket

Playing career^{1}
Years	Club	Games (Goals)
1978–87	Footscray	128 (12)
- ^{1} Playing statistics correct to the end of 1987.

Mick Egan (born 18 February 1958) is a former Australian rules footballer who played with Footscray in the Victorian Football League (VFL).

== Notes ==
Mick Egan won the Australians Biggest Galoot Competition in 2016 against contestants Daryl Riley (Jamieson Victoria) and Ian Jones (Essendon Victoria) as the runners up on the nationwide event.

Mick Egan also defeated Wayne ‘Spud’ Campbell in a golf tournament at the famous St Andrews golf club, Scotland, in May 2016.

However, Mick's lowest point in his long sporting career was coming a distant 4th to Cooke Morgan & Payne in the prestigious Melbourne State College 2000 metre Invitational in 1976
