= Charlie Merton =

Australian rules footballer, born 1918

Personal information
- Full name: Charles William Merton
- Born: 24 November 1918; Elmore, Victoria
- Died: 30 August 2000 (aged 81); Queensland
- Original team: Muckatah
- Height: 183 cm (6 ft 0 in)
- Weight: 89 kg (196 lb)

Playing career^{1}
Years	Club	Games (Goals)
1939	Footscray	3 (3)
- ^{1} Playing statistics correct to the end of 1939.

Charles William Merton (24 November 1918 – 30 August 2000) was an Australian rules footballer who played with Footscray in the Victorian Football League (VFL).

Merton apparently tied with the winner in the 1938 – Murray Football League O'Dwyer Medal, but strangely has not been officially recognised as a joint winner of the award.

Merton later served in the Australian Army during World War II.
