= Matt Byrachevski =

Australian rules footballer

Personal information
- Full name: Matt Byrachevski
- Born: 3 November 1958 (age 68)
- Original team: Parkside
- Height: 169 cm (5 ft 7 in)
- Weight: 72 kg (159 lb)

Playing career^{1}
Years	Club	Games (Goals)
1980	Footscray	3 (2)
- ^{1} Playing statistics correct to the end of 1980.

Matt Byrachevski (born 3 November 1958) is a former Australian rules footballer who played with Footscray in the Victorian Football League (VFL).
