= Bob Turner (footballer, born 1942) =

Australian rules footballer

Personal information
- Full name: Bob Turner
- Born: 17 February 1942 (age 84)
- Original team: Footscray Fifths
- Height: 173 cm (5 ft 8 in)
- Weight: 68 kg (150 lb)

Playing career^{1}
Years	Club	Games (Goals)
1960	Footscray	4 (0)
- ^{1} Playing statistics correct to the end of 1960.

Bob Turner (born 17 February 1942) is a former Australian rules footballer who played with Footscray in the Victorian Football League (VFL). He transferred to Williamstown in 1961 and played with the Seagulls until the end of 1966, totaling 57 games and 96 goals, playing in the losing 1961 VFA grand final against Yarraville and being awarded equal best first-year player. He won 'Town's best-and-fairest in 1964 and was selected on a half-forward flank in the Williamstown 1960's Team of the Decade.
