= Peter Shanahan =

Australian rules footballer

Personal information
- Full name: Peter Shanahan
- Born: 27 April 1946 (age 80)
- Height: 180 cm (5 ft 11 in)
- Weight: 82 kg (181 lb)

Playing career^{1}
Years	Club	Games (Goals)
1965–67	Footscray	23 (0)
- ^{1} Playing statistics correct to the end of 1967.

Peter Shanahan (born 27 April 1946) is a former Australian rules footballer who played with Footscray in the Victorian Football League (VFL).
