= Les Herring =

Australian rules footballer, born 1909

Personal information
- Full name: Les Herring
- Born: 8 June 1909
- Died: 29 April 1967 (aged 57)

Playing career^{1}
Years	Club	Games (Goals)
1932	Footscray	2 (1)
- ^{1} Playing statistics correct to the end of 1932.

Les Herring (8 June 1909 – 29 April 1967) was a former Australian rules footballer who played with Footscray in the Victorian Football League (VFL).
