= Bill Davies (footballer) =

Australian rules footballer

Personal information
- Full name: Bill Davies
- Born: 20 January 1930
- Died: 1 November 2003 (aged 73)
- Original team: Chelsea
- Height: 185 cm (6 ft 1 in)
- Weight: 83 kg (183 lb)

Playing career^{1}
Years	Club	Games (Goals)
1949	Footscray	1 (0)
- ^{1} Playing statistics correct to the end of 1949.

Bill Davies (20 January 1930 – 1 November 2003) was an Australian rules footballer who played with Footscray in the Victorian Football League (VFL).
