= Rowley Griffiths =

Australian rules footballer

Personal information
- Full name: Rowland Lihou Griffiths
- Born: 13 March 1895; Long Gully, Victoria
- Died: 21 April 1977 (aged 82); Canterbury, Victoria
- Original team: St Kilda District
- Height: 168 cm (5 ft 6 in)
- Weight: 73 kg (161 lb)

Playing career^{1}
Years	Club	Games (Goals)
1920–21	St Kilda	13 (1)
1925	Footscray	10 (0)
Total		23 (1)
- ^{1} Playing statistics correct to the end of 1925.

Rowley Griffiths (13 March 1895 – 21 April 1977) was an Australian rules footballer who played with St Kilda and Footscray in the Victorian Football League (VFL).
