= Sam Magill =

Australian rules footballer

Personal information
- Full name: Sam Magill
- Born: 22 June 1945
- Height: 174 cm (5 ft 9 in)
- Weight: 71 kg (157 lb)

Playing career^{1}
Years	Club	Games (Goals)
1964–65	Footscray	5 (2)
- ^{1} Playing statistics correct to the end of 1965.

Sam Magill (born 22 June 1945) is a former Australian rules footballer who played with Footscray in the Victorian Football League (VFL).
