= Leo Conlon =

Australian rules footballer, born 1901

Personal information
- Full name: Leo Conlon
- Born: 3 January 1901
- Died: 29 January 1973 (aged 72)
- Original team: South Ballarat

Playing career^{1}
Years	Club	Games (Goals)
1928	Footscray	3 (1)
- ^{1} Playing statistics correct to the end of 1928.

Leo Conlon (3 January 1901 – 29 January 1973) was a former Australian rules footballer who played with Footscray in the Victorian Football League (VFL).
