= Gordon Hale =

Australian rules footballer

Personal information
- Full name: Gordon Edwin Hale
- Born: 1 June 1923; Belmore, New South Wales
- Died: 9 September 2010 (aged 87); Melbourne, Victoria
- Original team: Golden Point
- Height: 179 cm (5 ft 10 in)
- Weight: 75 kg (165 lb)

Playing career^{1}
Years	Club	Games (Goals)
1943	Footscray	8 (2)
1945	Yarraville (VFA)	
- ^{1} Playing statistics correct to the end of 1945.

Gordon Edwin Hale (1 June 1923 – 9 September 1972) was an Australian rules footballer who played with Footscray in the Victorian Football League (VFL).
