= Percy Jackson (footballer, born 1907) =

Australian rules footballer, born 1907

Personal information
- Born: 19 January 1907
- Died: 4 August 1970 (aged 63)

Playing career^{1}
Years	Club	Games (Goals)
1934	Footscray	3 (0)
- ^{1} Playing statistics correct to the end of 1934.

Percy Jackson (19 January 1907 – 4 August 1970) was an Australian rules footballer who played with Footscray in the Victorian Football League (VFL).
