= Charlie Rowe (footballer) =

Australian rules footballer, born 1902

Personal information
- Born: 25 April 1902
- Died: 15 December 1958 (aged 56)
- Original team: South Bendigo
- Position: Wing / Rover

Playing career^{1}
| Years | Club | Games (Goals) |
| 1926–29 | Footscray | 55 (13) |
- ^{1} Playing statistics correct to the end of 1929.

Charlie Rowe (25 April 1902 – 15 December 1958) was a former Australian rules footballer who played with Footscray in the Victorian Football League (VFL).
