= Trevor Zeltner =

Australian rules footballer

Personal information
- Full name: Trevor John Zeltner
- Born: 8 April 1951 (age 75)
- Original team: Sale
- Height: 188 cm (6 ft 2 in)
- Weight: 84 kg (185 lb)

Playing career^{1}
Years	Club	Games (Goals)
1970–72	Footscray	18 (3)
- ^{1} Playing statistics correct to the end of 1972.

Trevor John Zeltner (born 8 April 1951) is a former Australian rules footballer who played with Footscray in the Victorian Football League (VFL). He left Footscray in 1973 to play for Acton and became senior coach the following season.

== Sources ==
- Holmesby, Russell & Main, Jim (2007). The Encyclopedia of AFL Footballers. 7th ed. Melbourne: Bas Publishing.
