= Noel Long =

Australian rules footballer

Personal information
- Full name: Noel Long
- Born: 2 November 1939
- Height: 183 cm (6 ft 0 in)
- Weight: 85 kg (187 lb)

Playing career^{1}
Years	Club	Games (Goals)
1959–60	Footscray	12 (12)
- ^{1} Playing statistics correct to the end of 1960.

Noel Long (born 2 November 1939) is a former Australian rules footballer who played with Footscray in the Victorian Football League (VFL).
