= Tom Miller (Australian footballer) =

Australian rules footballer

Personal information
- Full name: Tom Miller
- Born: 3 July 1928
- Died: 10 January 2025 (aged 96)
- Original team: Bentleigh / Oakleigh
- Height: 188 cm (6 ft 2 in)
- Weight: 102 kg (225 lb)

Playing career^{1}
Years	Club	Games (Goals)
1947–50	Footscray	34 (3)
- ^{1} Playing statistics correct to the end of 1950.

Tom Miller (3 July 1928 – 10 January 2025) was an Australian rules footballer who played with Footscray in the Victorian Football League (VFL).
