= George Woodman (footballer) =

Australian rules footballer, born 1900

Personal information
- Born: 10 May 1900
- Died: 1 June 1953 (aged 53)

Playing career^{1}
Years	Club	Games (Goals)
1927–28	Footscray	18 (18)
- ^{1} Playing statistics correct to the end of 1928.

George Woodman (10 May 1900 – 1 June 1953) was a former Australian rules footballer who played with Footscray in the Victorian Football League (VFL).
