= George Garlick =

Australian rules footballer

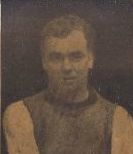

Personal information
- Full name: George Edward Charles Garlick
- Born: 17 August 1895; Maryborough, Victoria
- Died: 2 May 1969 (aged 73); Parkville, Victoria
- Original team: East Bendigo
- Height: 168 cm (5 ft 6 in)
- Weight: 69 kg (152 lb)

Playing career^{1}
Years	Club	Games (Goals)
1920	Melbourne	5 (4)
1925	Footscray	2 (1)
Total		7 (5)
- ^{1} Playing statistics correct to the end of 1925.

George Edward Charles Garlick (17 August 1895 – 2 May 1969) was an Australian rules footballer who played with Melbourne and Footscray in the Victorian Football League (VFL). His son, also named George, played for North Melbourne in the 1940s.
