= Haydn Sharp =

Australian rules footballer

Personal information
- Full name: Hayden Charles William Sharp
- Born: 20 October 1920; Footscray, Victoria
- Died: 18 September 1998 (aged 77)
- Original team: Parkside
- Height: 173 cm (5 ft 8 in)
- Weight: 63 kg (139 lb)

Playing career^{1}
Years	Club	Games (Goals)
1939	Footscray	4 (4)
- ^{1} Playing statistics correct to the end of 1939.

Haydn Sharp (20 October 1920 – 18 September 1998) was an Australian rules footballer who played with Footscray in the Victorian Football League (VFL).

He mainly played in the second eighteen, only playing four league games for the senior side but finished equal second in the Gardiner Medal in 1939.

He later served in the Royal Australian Navy at HMAS Moreton during World War II.
