= Murray Zeuschner =

Australian rules footballer

Personal information
- Full name: Murray Zeuschner
- Born: 25 November 1938 (age 87)
- Original team: Stony Creek

Playing career^{1}
Years	Club	Games (Goals)
1962–67	Footscray	64 (4)
- ^{1} Playing statistics correct to the end of 1967.

Murray Zeuschner (born 25 November 1938) is a former Australian rules footballer who played with Footscray in the Victorian Football League (VFL). Zeuschner was ruckman and defender. After an unsuccessful attempt to break into the senior Carlton side through their reserve team, he moved to Footscray and found a regular place in the side.

== Sources ==
- Holmesby, Russell & Main, Jim (2007). The Encyclopedia of AFL Footballers. 7th ed. Melbourne: Bas Publishing.
