= Peter Wood (footballer, born 1939) =

Australian rules footballer

Personal information
- Full name: Peter Wood
- Born: 11 November 1939
- Original team: Oakleigh
- Height: 173 cm (5 ft 8 in)
- Weight: 78 kg (172 lb)

Playing career^{1}
Years	Club	Games (Goals)
1959–61	Footscray	14 (0)
- ^{1} Playing statistics correct to the end of 1961.

Peter Wood (born 11 November 1939) is a former Australian rules footballer who played with Footscray in the Victorian Football League (VFL).
