= Bill Costello =

Australian rules footballer

Personal information
- Full name: Bill Costello
- Born: 25 December 1934
- Original team: Black Rock
- Height: 173 cm (5 ft 8 in)
- Weight: 76 kg (168 lb)

Playing career^{1}
| Years | Club | Games (Goals) |
| 1957–58 | Footscray | 16 (10) |
- ^{1} Playing statistics correct to the end of 1958.

Bill Costello (born 25 December 1934) is a former Australian rules footballer who played with Footscray in the Victorian Football League (VFL).
