= Lindsay McLure =

Australian rules footballer, born 1913

Personal information
- Full name: Lindsay McLure
- Born: 12 June 1913
- Died: 24 October 2008 (aged 95)
- Original team: Yea
- Height: 187 cm (6 ft 2 in)
- Weight: 83 kg (183 lb)

Playing career^{1}
Years	Club	Games (Goals)
1937–38	Footscray	4 (2)
- ^{1} Playing statistics correct to the end of 1938.

Lindsay McLure (12 June 1913 – 24 October 2008) was a former Australian rules footballer who played with Footscray in the Victorian Football League (VFL).
