= Joe Weldon =

Australian rules footballer

Personal information
- Full name: Joseph Robert Weldon
- Born: 18 June 1922; Yarraville, Victoria
- Died: 10 August 2007 (aged 85); Coombabah, Queensland
- Original team: North Footscray
- Height: 185 cm (6 ft 1 in)
- Weight: 96 kg (212 lb)

Playing career^{1}
| Years | Club | Games (Goals) |
| 1943–44, 1946 | Footscray | 9 (3) |
- ^{1} Playing statistics correct to the end of 1946.

Joseph Robert Weldon (18 June 1922 – 10 August 2007) was an Australian rules footballer who played with Footscray in the Victorian Football League (VFL).

His football career was interrupted by his service in World War II.
