= Percy Malbon =

Australian rules footballer, born 1917

Personal information
- Full name: Percival Stanley Malbon
- Born: 7 October 1917; Yarraville, Victoria
- Died: 21 July 2007 (aged 89)
- Original team: South Footscray
- Height: 185 cm (6 ft 1 in)
- Weight: 83 kg (183 lb)

Playing career^{1}
| Years | Club | Games (Goals) |
| 1941 | Footscray | 9 (6) |
- ^{1} Playing statistics correct to the end of 1941.

Percival Stanley Malbon (7 October 1917 – 21 July 2007) was an Australian rules footballer who played with Footscray in the Victorian Football League (VFL).
