= Edwin Latham =

Australian rules footballer, born 1914

Personal information
- Full name: Edwin Alexander Latham
- Born: 16 October 1914; Richmond, Victoria
- Died: 25 September 1982 (aged 67); Darwin, Northern Territory
- Original team: Kew

Playing career^{1}
Years	Club	Games (Goals)
1936	Footscray	2 (2)
- ^{1} Playing statistics correct to the end of 1936.

Edwin Alexander Latham (16 October 1914 – 25 September 1982) was an Australian rules footballer who played with Footscray in the Victorian Football League (VFL).
