= Bernie Hogan =

Australian rules footballer

Personal information
- Full name: Bernard Alexander Hogan
- Born: 18 November 1925; Mildura, Victoria
- Died: 1 December 2006 (aged 81); Broulee, New South Wales
- Original team: Merbein
- Height: 180 cm (5 ft 11 in)
- Weight: 75 kg (165 lb)

Playing career^{1}
Years	Club	Games (Goals)
1949	Footscray	2 (0)
- ^{1} Playing statistics correct to the end of 1949.

Bernard Alexander Hogan (18 November 1925 – 1 December 2006) was an Australian rules footballer who played for the Footscray Football Club in the Victorian Football League (VFL).
