= Allan Moncrieff =

Australian rules footballer (1924–2015)

- Moncrieff (left) kicking during a match

Personal information
- Full name: Allan William Moncrieff
- Born: 19 March 1924; Cheltenham, Victoria
- Died: 1 February 2015 (aged 90)
- Original team: Parkdale Amateurs
- Height: 185 cm (6 ft 1 in)
- Weight: 83 kg (183 lb)
- Position: Half-forward / centre

Playing career^{1}
Years	Club	Games (Goals)
1943, 1945–1951	Footscray	67 (44)
- ^{1} Playing statistics correct to the end of 1951.

Allan William Moncrieff (19 March 1924 – 1 February 2015 ) was an Australian rules footballer who played for the Footscray Football Club in the Victorian Football League (VFL).

After playing a couple of games in 1943, Moncreiff's early career was interrupted by his service in the Australian Army in during World War II.

Moncrieff's son Michael Moncrieff played VFL football for Hawthorn Football Club.

== Sources ==
- Hillier, K. (2004) Like Father Like Son, Pennon Publishing: Melbourne. ISBN 1-877029-73-4.
