= Bob Barr (Australian footballer) =

Australian rules footballer

Personal information
- Full name: Bob Barr
- Born: 9 July 1945 (age 81)
- Original team: Parkside
- Height: 179 cm (5 ft 10 in)
- Weight: 70 kg (154 lb)

Playing career^{1}
Years	Club	Games (Goals)
1964–65	Footscray	7 (1)
- ^{1} Playing statistics correct to the end of 1965.

Bob Barr (born 9 July 1945) is a former Australian rules footballer who played with Footscray in the Victorian Football League (VFL).
