= Alan McGill =

Australian rules footballer

Personal information
- Full name: Alan McGill
- Born: 9 April 1939 (age 87)
- Original team: Footscray District
- Height: 175 cm (5 ft 9 in)
- Weight: 73 kg (161 lb)

Playing career^{1}
Years	Club	Games (Goals)
1959	Footscray	1 (0)
- ^{1} Playing statistics correct to the end of 1959.

Alan McGill (born 9 April 1939) is a former Australian rules footballer who played for the Footscray Football Club in the Victorian Football League (VFL).
