= Rob Sainsbury =

Australian rules footballer (1916–2007)

Personal information
- Full name: Robert Harold Sainsbury
- Born: 5 January 1916; Footscray, Victoria
- Died: 11 May 2007 (aged 91)
- Original team: Parkside
- Height: 173 cm (5 ft 8 in)
- Weight: 70 kg (154 lb)
- Position: Utility

Playing career^{1}
Years	Club	Games (Goals)
1935, 1937–41	Footscray	43 (2)
- ^{1} Playing statistics correct to the end of 1941.

Robert Harold Sainsbury (5 January 1916 – 11 May 2007) was an Australian rules footballer who played with Footscray in the Victorian Football League (VFL).

Sainsbury later served in the Royal Australian Air Force during World War II.
