= Mark Cullen (Australian footballer) =

Australian rules footballer

Personal information
- Full name: Mark Cullen
- Born: 23 September 1968 (age 58)
- Original team: St Albans
- Height: 180 cm (5 ft 11 in)
- Weight: 76 kg (168 lb)

Playing career^{1}
Years	Club	Games (Goals)
1986–91	Footscray	35 (25)
- ^{1} Playing statistics correct to the end of 1991.

Mark Cullen (born 23 September 1968) is a former Australian rules footballer who played with Footscray in the Victorian Football League (VFL).
