= Les Punch =

Australian rules footballer (1895–1948)

Personal information
- Full name: Leslie Gordon Punch
- Born: 10 July 1895; Collingwood, Victoria
- Died: 8 July 1948 (aged 52); Auburn, Victoria
- Height: 165 cm (5 ft 5 in)
- Weight: 67 kg (148 lb)

Playing career^{1}
Years	Club	Games (Goals)
1925	Footscray	11 (10)
- ^{1} Playing statistics correct to the end of 1925.

Leslie Gordon Punch (10 July 1895 – 8 July 1948) was an Australian rules footballer who played with Footscray in the Victorian Football League (VFL).
