= Seddon Bagley =

Australian rules footballer, born 1901

Personal information
- Full name: Seddon Deaderick Bagley
- Born: 31 December 1901; Burnie, Tasmania
- Died: 5 September 1981 (aged 79); Queenscliff, Victoria
- Original team: St Kilda Reserves / Prahran Juniors

Playing career^{1}
Years	Club	Games (Goals)
1925–26	Footscray	5 (6)
- ^{1} Playing statistics correct to the end of 1926.

Seddon Deaderick Bagley (31 December 1901 – 5 September 1981) was an Australian rules footballer who played with Footscray in the Victorian Football League (VFL).
