= Frank Bult =

Australian rules footballer, born 1901

Personal information
- Full name: Frank Bult
- Born: 30 April 1901; Ballarat East, Victoria
- Died: 19 July 1963 (aged 62); Sunshine, Victoria
- Original team: East Sydney

Playing career^{1}
Years	Club	Games (Goals)
1927–28	Footscray	20 (4)
- ^{1} Playing statistics correct to the end of 1928.

Frank Bult (30 April 1901 – 19 July 1963) was an Australian rules footballer who played with Footscray in the Victorian Football League (VFL).
