= Brian Prior (footballer) =

Australian rules footballer

Personal information
- Full name: Brian Prior
- Born: 13 September 1938
- Died: 27 November 2011 (aged 73)
- Original team: Braybrook
- Height: 182 cm (6 ft 0 in)
- Weight: 80 kg (176 lb)

Playing career^{1}
| Years | Club | Games (Goals) |
| 1958–60 | Footscray | 13 (9) |
- ^{1} Playing statistics correct to the end of 1960.

Brian Prior (13 September 1938 – 27 November 2011) was a former Australian rules footballer who played with Footscray in the Victorian Football League (VFL).
