= Bruce Rohde =

Australian rules footballer

Personal information
- Full name: Bruce James Rohde
- Born: 31 January 1950 (age 76)
- Original team: Morwell
- Height: 183 cm (6 ft 0 in)
- Weight: 86 kg (190 lb)

Playing career^{1}
Years	Club	Games (Goals)
1971	Footscray	4 (0)
- ^{1} Playing statistics correct to the end of 1971.

Bruce Rohde (born 31 January 1950) is a former Australian rules footballer who played with Footscray in the Victorian Football League (VFL).

== Football ==
Recruited from the Morwell Football Club — he played representative football for the Latrobe Valley — he played VFL football with Footscray, and, in 1974, he was captain-coach of the Brisbane-based Western Districts Australian Football Club.

He was a member of the Queensland representative team in 1974 and in 1975 (when he was vice-captain of the team).

== See also ==
- 1974 Minor States Carnival
