= Tommy Eason =

Australian rules footballer, born 1908

Personal information
- Full name: Thomas George Eason
- Born: 16 December 1908; Footscray, Victoria
- Died: 21 January 1977 (aged 68); Brooklyn, Victoria
- Original team: Parkside

Playing career^{1}
Years	Club	Games (Goals)
1932	Footscray	1 (0)
- ^{1} Playing statistics correct to the end of 1932.

Thomas George Eason (16 December 1908 – 21 January 1977) was an Australian rules footballer who played with Footscray in the Victorian Football League (VFL).

He later served in the Royal Australian Air Force during World War II.
