= Jimmy Rudd (Australian footballer) =

Australian rules footballer, born 1901

Personal information
- Full name: James John Rudd
- Born: 2 September 1901; Williamstown, Victoria
- Died: 20 May 1996 (aged 94)
- Original team: Port Melbourne
- Height: 178 cm (5 ft 10 in)
- Weight: 67 kg (148 lb)

Playing career^{1}
Years	Club	Games (Goals)
1922–26	Port Melbourne (VFA)	75 (17)
1925	Footscray	10 (0)
- ^{1} Playing statistics correct to the end of 1926.

James John Rudd (2 September 1901 – 20 May 1996) was an Australian rules footballer who played with Footscray in the Victorian Football League (VFL).

Rudd played for Port Melbourne for three and a half years before crossing to Footscray half way through their inaugural VFL season. He returned to Port Melbourne at the start of the following season.

Rudd later served in the Royal Australian Air Force during World War II.
