= Roger McHardy =

Australian rules footballer

Personal information
- Full name: Roger McHardy
- Born: 13 August 1952 (age 74)
- Original team: Moe Colts / Doutta Stars
- Height: 180 cm (5 ft 11 in)
- Weight: 76 kg (168 lb)

Playing career^{1}
Years	Club	Games (Goals)
1970–71	Footscray	2 (1)
- ^{1} Playing statistics correct to the end of 1971.

Roger McHardy (born 13 August 1952) is a former Australian rules footballer who played with Footscray in the Victorian Football League (VFL).
