= Norm Gardner (footballer) =

Australian rules footballer

Personal information
- Full name: Norman Edward Gardner
- Born: 16 December 1921; Footscray, Victoria
- Died: 17 July 2004 (aged 82); Glen Waverley, Victoria
- Original team: Yarraville
- Height: 175 cm (5 ft 9 in)
- Weight: 80 kg (176 lb)

Playing career^{1}
Years	Club	Games (Goals)
1947	Footscray	2 (0)
- ^{1} Playing statistics correct to the end of 1947.

Norman Edward Gardner (16 December 1921 – 17 July 2004) was an Australian rules footballer who played with Footscray in the Victorian Football League (VFL).
