= Tony Fox (Australian rules footballer) =

Australian rules footballer

Personal information
- Full name: Tony Fox
- Born: 16 July 1958 (age 68)
- Original team: Brooklyn
- Height: 182 cm (6 ft 0 in)
- Weight: 77 kg (170 lb)

Playing career^{1}
Years	Club	Games (Goals)
1978	Footscray	1 (0)
- ^{1} Playing statistics correct to the end of 1978.

Tony Fox (born 16 July 1958) is a former Australian rules footballer who played with Footscray in the Victorian Football League (VFL).
