= Norm Tivendale =

Australian rules footballer

Personal information
- Full name: Norm Tivendale
- Born: 2 October 1955 (age 71)
- Original team: Berwick
- Height: 187 cm (6 ft 2 in)
- Weight: 78 kg (172 lb)

Playing career^{1}
Years	Club	Games (Goals)
1978–79	Footscray	7 (1)
- ^{1} Playing statistics correct to the end of 1979.

Career highlights
- Debut game against Collingwood at Victoria Park in 1979, held dual Brownlow Medallist Peter Moore to less than 10 possessions.

Norm Tivendale (born 2 October 1955) is a former Australian rules footballer who played with Footscray in the Victorian Football League (VFL).
