= Peter Munro (footballer) =

Australian rules footballer

Personal information
- Full name: Peter Munro
- Born: 16 November 1957 (age 68)
- Original team: Traralgon
- Height: 180 cm (5 ft 11 in)
- Weight: 87 kg (192 lb)

Playing career^{1}
Years	Club	Games (Goals)
1976–78	Footscray	19 (12)
- ^{1} Playing statistics correct to the end of 1978.

Peter Munro (born 16 November 1957) is a former Australian rules footballer who played with Footscray in the Victorian Football League (VFL).
