= Arthur Barlow (footballer) =

Australian rules footballer, born 1904

Personal information
- Full name: Arthur James Barlow
- Born: 23 October 1904; Port Melbourne, Victoria
- Died: 21 August 1951 (aged 46); Port Melbourne, Victoria
- Original team: Prahran

Playing career^{1}
Years	Club	Games (Goals)
1925–1928	South Melbourne	40 (10)
1928–1929	Footscray	7 (2)
Total		47 (12)
- ^{1} Playing statistics correct to the end of 1929.

Arthur James Barlow (23 October 1904 – 21 August 1951) was an Australian rules footballer who played for the South Melbourne Football Club and Footscray Football Club in the Victorian Football League (VFL).
