= Roy Rawlings (footballer) =

Australian rules footballer

Personal information
- Full name: Roy Eric Arthur Rawlings
- Born: 28 January 1921; Rosebery, Tasmania
- Died: 18 March 2014 (aged 93); Victoria
- Original team: Yarraville
- Height: 179 cm (5 ft 10 in)
- Weight: 78 kg (172 lb)

Playing career^{1}
Years	Club	Games (Goals)
1945	Footscray	4 (1)
- ^{1} Playing statistics correct to the end of 1945.

Roy Eric Arthur Rawlings (28 January 1921 – 18 March 2014) was an Australian rules footballer who played with Footscray in the Victorian Football League (VFL).
