= Peter McPhee (footballer) =

Australian rules footballer

Personal information
- Full name: Peter McPhee
- Born: 12 January 1934 (age 92)
- Height: 170 cm (5 ft 7 in)
- Weight: 72 kg (159 lb)

Playing career^{1}
Years	Club	Games (Goals)
1954	Footscray	4 (0)
- ^{1} Playing statistics correct to the end of 1954.

Peter McPhee (born 12 January 1934) is a former Australian rules footballer who played with Footscray in the Victorian Football League (VFL).
