= Jack Hanson (footballer) =

Australian rules footballer, born 1909

Personal information
- Full name: Matthew John Hanson
- Born: 14 October 1909; Broken Hill, New South Wales
- Died: 7 November 1989 (aged 80)
- Original team: South Broken Hill

Playing career^{1}
Years	Club	Games (Goals)
1931–33	Footscray	29 (0)
- ^{1} Playing statistics correct to the end of 1933.

Matthew John Hanson (14 October 1909 – 7 November 1989) was an Australian rules footballer who played with Footscray in the Victorian Football League (VFL).
