= Wally Trusler =

Australian rules footballer

Personal information
- Full name: Wally Trusler
- Born: 10 April 1941
- Died: 3 April 2008 (aged 66)
- Height: 178 cm (5 ft 10 in)
- Weight: 77 kg (170 lb)

Playing career^{1}
Years	Club	Games (Goals)
1959	Footscray	1 (0)
- ^{1} Playing statistics correct to the end of 1959.

Wally Trusler (10 April 1941 – 3 April 2008) was a former Australian rules footballer who played with Footscray in the Victorian Football League (VFL).
