= Frank Barton (Australian footballer) =

Australian rules footballer, born 1900

Personal information
- Full name: Frank Barton
- Born: 31 October 1900
- Died: 16 November 1983 (aged 83)
- Original team: Yarraville
- Height: 175 cm (5 ft 9 in)
- Weight: 75 kg (165 lb)

Playing career^{1}
Years	Club	Games (Goals)
1926	Footscray	2 (0)
- ^{1} Playing statistics correct to the end of 1926.

Frank Barton (31 October 1900 – 16 November 1983) was a former Australian rules footballer who played with Footscray in the Victorian Football League (VFL).
