= Allan Trusler =

Australian rules footballer (1933–2022)

Personal information
- Full name: Allan Rodney Trusler
- Born: 23 June 1933
- Died: 9 April 2022 (aged 88)
- Original team: West Footscray YCW
- Height: 175 cm (5 ft 9 in)
- Weight: 72 kg (159 lb)

Playing career^{1}
Years	Club	Games (Goals)
1953–1955	Footscray	16 (22)
- ^{1} Playing statistics correct to the end of 1955.

Allan Trusler (23 June 1933 – 9 April 2022) was an Australian rules footballer who played for the Footscray Football Club in the Victorian Football League (VFL).
