= Norm Thompson (Australian footballer) =

Australian rules footballer (1933–2017)

Personal information
- Full name: Norman Joseph Thompson
- Born: 15 June 1933
- Died: 11 January 2017 (aged 83)
- Original team: Box Hill
- Height: 180 cm (5 ft 11 in)
- Weight: 73 kg (161 lb)

Playing career^{1}
Years	Club	Games (Goals)
1951–52	Box Hill (VFA)	19 (7)
1953–54	Footscray	6 (0)
1956	St Kilda	5 (1)
1957–59	Brunswick (VFA)	11 (2)
Total		41 (10)
- ^{1} Playing statistics correct to the end of 1956.

Norman Joseph Thompson (15 June 1933 – 11 January 2017) was an Australian rules footballer who played with Footscray and St Kilda in the Victorian Football League (VFL).
