= Wally Fraser =

Australian rules footballer

Personal information
- Full name: Walter Edward Fraser
- Born: 18 June 1897; Williamstown, Victoria
- Died: 10 June 1966 (aged 68); Elsternwick, Victoria
- Original team: Footscray Juniors / Scotch College
- Height: 178 cm (5 ft 10 in)
- Weight: 72 kg (159 lb)

Playing career^{1}
| Years | Club | Games (Goals) |
| 1920–22 | Essendon | 19 (10) |
| 1923–24 | Footscray (VFA) | 29 (20) |
| 1925 | Footscray | 6 (3) |
| Total | | 54 (33) |
- ^{1} Playing statistics correct to the end of 1925.

Wally Fraser (18 June 1897 – 10 June 1966) was an Australian rules footballer who played with Essendon and Footscray in the Victorian Football League (VFL).
