= Graeme M. Cook =

Australian rules footballer

Graeme Cook

Personal information
- Full name: Graeme Cook
- Born: 1 April 1948 (age 78)
- Original team: Hopetoun
- Height: 185 cm (6 ft 1 in)
- Weight: 90 kg (198 lb)
- Position: Rover / Utility

Playing career^{1}
Years	Club	Games (Goals)
1966–70	Footscray	37 (17)
- ^{1} Playing statistics correct to the end of 1970.

Graeme Cook (born 1 April 1948) is a former Australian rules footballer who played with Footscray in the Victorian Football League (VFL).
