= Eric Huppatz =

Australian rules footballer, born 1918

Personal information
- Full name: Eric Albert Huppatz
- Born: 11 January 1918; Warracknabeal, Victoria
- Died: 6 September 1983 (aged 65); Portland, Victoria
- Original team: Portland
- Height: 173 cm (5 ft 8 in)
- Weight: 73 kg (161 lb)

Playing career^{1}
Years	Club	Games (Goals)
1941–42	Footscray	4 (4)
- ^{1} Playing statistics correct to the end of 1942.

Eric Albert Huppatz (11 January 1918 – 6 September 1983) was an Australian rules footballer who played with Footscray in the Victorian Football League (VFL).
