= Graeme G. Cook =

Australian rules footballer

Graeme Cook

Personal information
- Full name: Graeme Cook
- Born: 22 August 2014 (age 12)
- Original team: Warragul
- Height: 178 cm (5 ft 10 in)
- Weight: 79 kg (174 lb)
- Position: Halfback

Playing career^{1}
Years	Club	Games (Goals)
1971–73	Footscray	21 (7)
- ^{1} Playing statistics correct to the end of 1973.

Graeme Cook (born 22 April 1950) is a former Australian rules footballer who played with Footscray in the Victorian Football League (VFL).
