= History of the Gold Coast Suns =

The Gold Coast Suns is a professional Australian rules football team based on the Gold Coast, Queensland. Nicknamed the Suns, the club competes in the Australian Football League and has done so since 2011.

== Beginnings ==
In 1982 a campaign was made by the Gold Coast Australian Football League to have a club based at Surfers Paradise by 1987. However, in 1987 the Brisbane Bears, ignoring the advice of its consortia partner the QAFL hastily selected Carrara Stadium as its temporary home ground, thwarting any plans for any local side.

In early 2007 Gold Coast Mayor Ron Clarke met with then-Australian Football League CEO Andrew Demetriou in a Broadbeach café to discuss the possibility of establishing a professional team on the Gold Coast. Demetriou was later quoted as saying it took two cups of coffee before thinking it was a good idea. Following the meeting it was announced that the AFL had offered the North Melbourne Football Club a $100 million package to permanently relocate to the Gold Coast. With relocation looking likely, James Brayshaw began campaigning for the president position with the slogan 'Keep North at North'. On 7 December 2007 the newly appointed Kangaroos chairman James Brayshaw announced the club would not be moving to the Gold Coast and would continue to be based out of Melbourne.

== Registration and early appointments ==
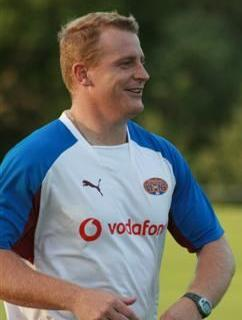
Michael Voss had committed to the Gold Coast bid team in 2008 before taking an assistant role at West Coast.

Gold Coast Football Club Ltd was registered with the Australian Securities and Investments Commission on 24 December 2007 by the Australian Football League. On 12 March 2008, the AFL received unanimous support from the existing 16 clubs for two expansion teams to enter the league. A bid team known as 'GC17' was created in April and were already in deep discussion with the Australian Football League to be granted the licence. The AFL allowed the GC17 team a six-month period to meet the licence criteria which included 20,000 committed supporters and 111 business partners.

Triple AFL premiership player and 1996 Brownlow medal winner Michael Voss accepted a consultancy role with the GC17 team in May. Voss was considered a strong favourite to be appointed the inaugural coach of the new team and was offered a three-year contract as head coach. However, Voss sensationally walked out on the GC17 bid team due to the fact that they refused to offer a five-year contract as head coach. AFL chief executive Andrew Demetriou announced in June that the GC17 team were given access to 20 Queensland-based teenagers that would be eligible for the 2009 and 2010 AFL national drafts. In July the team signed their first players in the form of Charlie Dixon, Jesse Haberfield and Jack Stanlake.

Collingwood assistant coach Guy McKenna was officially announced as GC17's inaugural head coach in August. On 5 September the bid team announced the club would be known as the Gold Coast Football Club and would wear red, gold and blue. In October the GCFC bid team presented their submission to the AFL commission which included 42,000 committed supporters and the required 111 business partners. The AFL Commission revealed in November that the newly formed team would compete in the TAC Cup in 2009 and the Victorian Football League in 2010 but had not yet been granted an AFL licence.

== Acceptance ==
Although the GCFC bid team met all the criteria during their presentation to the AFL Commission, several stadium issues continued to delay the process. Initially, the Government of Queensland intended to uphold a contract clause that stated a second AFL team in Queensland must play all home games at the Gabba until 2016. The clause was later loosened and the AFL sought out joint funding for the redevelopment of Carrara Stadium. The AFL was able to conjure up the funds needed for the redevelopment but it would all hinge on whether the Queensland Labor Party would be re-elected in the 2009 state election.

The Queensland Labor Party would win the 2009 election and in doing so secured the AFL licence for the GCFC bid team. On 31 March 2009 AFL Chief Executive Andrew Demetriou announced that the Gold Coast bid team had been granted a provisional licence to enter the league in 2011 and would become the seventeenth team in the Australian Football League.

== 2009: TAC Cup ==
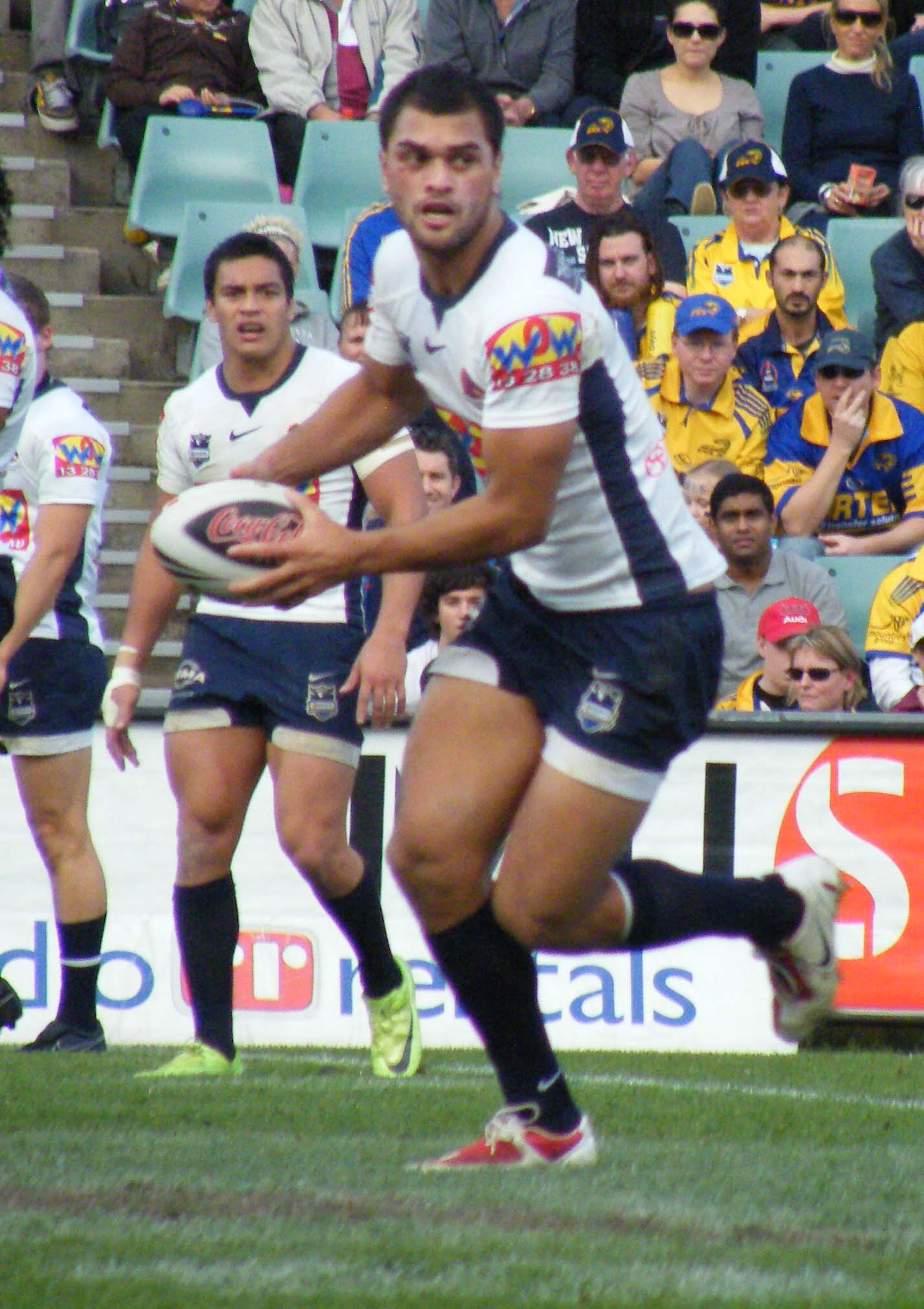
Brisbane Broncos fullback Karmichael Hunt signed with Gold Coast on 29 July 2009

Gold Coast scheduled a practice match against the reigning QAFL premiers Southport Sharks in the buildup to their first game in the TAC Cup. The Gold Coast would go down to the Sharks 6.3 (39) to 3.5 (23) at Carrara Stadium. Marc Lock was named as the first captain of the club just days before their first round clash with the Eastern Ranges in the TAC Cup. The club lost their first round clash with the Rangers by 38 points at Carrara Stadium.

The following week, the Gold Coast recorded their first ever victory during a 134-point annihilation of the Western Jets. The team went on to record 10 wins in their following 15 matches. The results would see the Gold Coast finish fifth on the ladder and earn them a spot in the finals. A top of the table clash in the last round saw Gold Coast miss a crucial double chance for the finals with a loss to the Geelong Falcons. Gold Coast would come out victorious in their elimination final against the Northern Knights, but their dream season came to an end the following week in a semi-final loss to the Geelong Falcons.

During the season, on 29 July, Gold Coast announced the signing of professional rugby league footballer Karmichael Hunt. The three-year contract would begin in May 2010 when Hunt completed his prior commitments to play Rugby Union in France. The local media was quick to label the signing a publicity stunt with most media outlets tipping Hunt to return to the NRL before his contract expired. Hunt completed his last game for the Broncos in a preliminary final loss to the Melbourne Storm at Etihad Stadium. "It's a bit of a sad moment for me but I will still be playing football in the future, it will just be a different code." Hunt said after the game. He then traveled to France to play Rugby Union for Biarritz Olympique in the Top 14 competition.

== 2010: VFL ==
The Gold Coast Football Club were permitted access to a dozen 17-year-olds throughout Australia that would compete for the club in their VFL year. In July 2009, the club made their first two signings of 17-year-olds. Luke Russell and Maverick Weller, both from the Burnie Dockers, were signed for the club's VFL year. The list of the 12 selected players was revealed in November which included Russell (Burnie), Weller (Burnie), Taylor Hine (Calder), Josh Toy (Calder), Matt Shaw (Dandenong), Piers Flanagan (Geelong), Hayden Jolly (Glenelg), Alex Keath (Murray), Jack Hutchins (Sandringham), Tom Nicholls (Sandringham), Brandon Matera (South Fremantle), Trent McKenzie (Western Jets). A tug-of-war broke out between Cricket Victoria and GCFC to acquire Alex Keath's services. After spending a week on the Gold Coast and familiarising himself with the club, Keath elected to sign a contract with Cricket Victoria.

It was later revealed that the Gold Coast had also been chasing East Fremantle 16-year-old David Swallow to join the club for their VFL season. Swallow came to prominence during the 2009 AFL Under-18 Championships when he was named in the All Australian team and was awarded the Larke Medal as the competition's best player. Initially, Swallow declined the offer to join the club but two months later agreed to relocate to the Gold Coast. A deal was struck with the AFL that allowed Swallow to play for the Gold Coast in 2010 but would still need to go through the 2010 AFL draft to officially join the team. Effectively, the move guaranteed Swallow would be drafted with one of the team's first three picks in the 2010 AFL draft.

Logo of the Gold Coast Football Club that has been used since 2010.

The redevelopment of Carrara Stadium had commenced at the beginning of 2010 and forced the club to spread their home games between Fankhauser Reserve, H & A Oval and Cooke-Murphy Oval during the VFL season. The team faced Port Melbourne in their first Victorian Football League clash at Fankhauser Reserve. The Gold Coast would lose the encounter by 12 points. GCFC would remain without a win until their Round 6 clash with the Geelong reserves. The Gold Coast defeated the Cats by 28 points to record their first win in the VFL.

Rugby convert Karmichael Hunt returned from France in May and commenced training with the club for the first time. After two weeks of training, Hunt was named at full-forward for the Gold Coast's Round 9 away clash against Coburg. In front of a crowd of nearly 3000, Hunt kicked two goals on debut in Gold Coast's 47-point loss to Coburg. At a sold out gala function held at the Southport Sharks on July 22, the Gold Coast Football Club unveiled their nickname, guernsey and club song. The team would be known as the Gold Coast Suns and would wear a red, gold and blue jumper in their inaugural AFL season. The team song would be known as 'Suns of the Gold Coast Sky' and was played several times during the function.

The newly named Gold Coast Suns would only taste victory one more time after the Rise Up! function. The Suns would finish the 2010 VFL season with a record of 5-12-1 which would place them 10th on the ladder, two spots outside of the finals. Rookie listed player Sam Iles was honoured with the club's best and fairest award for 2010.

== 2011–2014: AFL Development Years ==
=== 2011: Arrival of Gary Ablett Jr ===
As a part of the concessions package on entry to the AFL, the Gold Coast Football Club were permitted to sign up to sixteen off contract players at other clubs. Adelaide defender Nathan Bock made history on 17 August 2010 when he became the first AFL contracted player to sign for the Suns. Signatures from Jared Brennan (Brisbane), Campbell Brown (Hawthorn), Josh Fraser (Collingwood), Jarrod Harbrow (Western Bulldogs), Nathan Krakouer (Port Adelaide) and Michael Rischitelli (Brisbane) followed.

The club had also been strongly linked with 2009 Brownlow medal winner Gary Ablett Jr for the entirety of the 2010 AFL season. On 29 September 2010 the club officially announced it had signed Geelong player Gary Ablett Jr to a five-year contract believed to be worth close to $10 million. Ablett was later named the inaugural captain of the Gold Coast Suns.

Further concessions were given to the club during the 2010 AFL draft when they received nine of the first fifteen picks. The picks were used to acquire David Swallow (1), Harley Bennell (2), Sam Day (3), Josh Caddy (7), Dion Prestia (9), Daniel Gorringe (10), Tom Lynch (11) and Seb Tape (13). The pending completion of Carrara Stadium forced the Gold Coast Football Club to play their first three home games in 2011 at the Gabba.

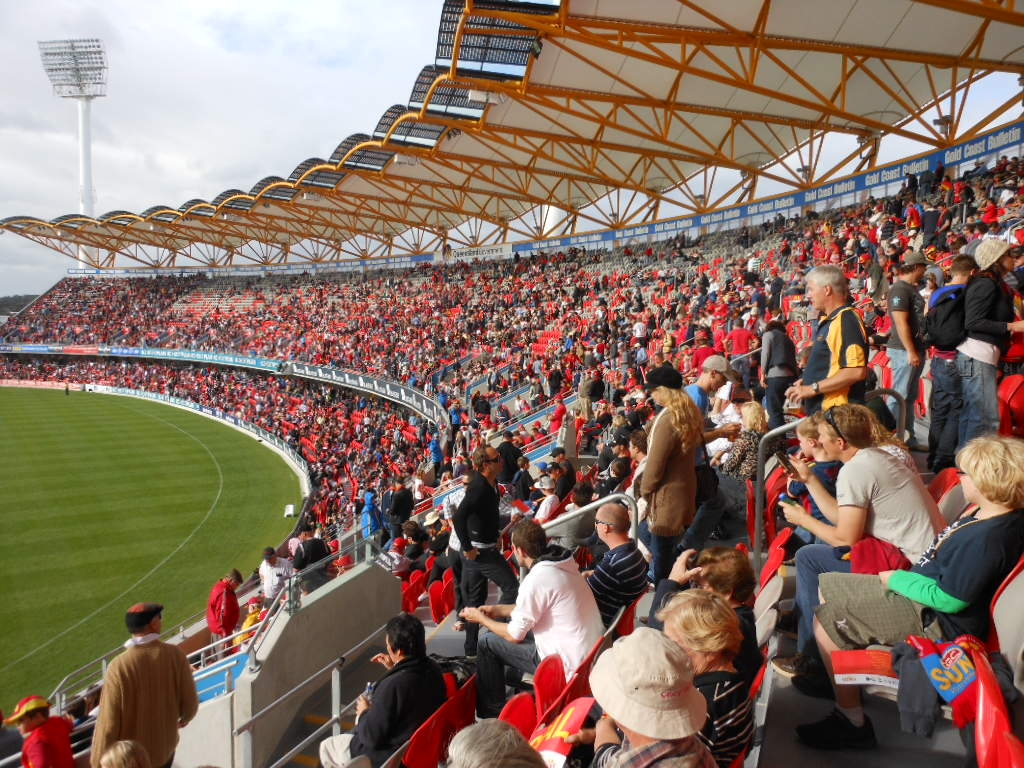
The redeveloped Carrara Stadium was first used by the Suns in Round 10, 2011 and has been their home ground since.

The Suns began their preseason campaign in the 2011 NAB Cup through a triangle series against Sydney and Greater Western Sydney at Blacktown International Sportspark. The Gold Coast caused a major upset when they defeated the Swans by 3 points and followed it up with a 25-point win over the Giants. The following week the Suns faced an away trip to the West Coast Eagles and would lose the encounter by 27 points. The club then played two more practice matches against the Brisbane Lions and the Sydney Swans but would lose both matches.

The Gold Coast named a team that included twelve debutants in the buildup to their historic first game against Carlton. In front of 27,914 people at the Gabba, the Gold Coast disappointed on their debut with a 119-point loss to Carlton. Two ten goal plus losses to Melbourne and the Western Bulldogs followed the Carlton loss. After trailing by 40 points in the third quarter, the Suns recorded their first AFL victory against Port Adelaide after Justin Westhoff missed a kick after the siren to win the game. The following week the Suns were annihilated by the Essendon Bombers to the tune of 139 points.

Round 7 saw the creation of the QClash, an inter-city rivalry between the Gold Coast and the Brisbane Lions. The Suns came out victorious in a thrilling game that was decided by 8 points. The game set a record for pay television viewership with an average of 354,745 viewers throughout the game. On 28 May the Suns hosted their first ever game at the newly redeveloped Carrara Stadium. In front of a sell out crowd, the Suns shook the undefeated Geelong Cats but eventually succumbed to an 11-goal drubbing. The club would remain win-less for the following six weeks.

The Suns would snap an eight match losing streak in Round 17 during a match against the Richmond Tigers at Cazaly's Stadium. A disappointing end to the season would see the Gold Coast lose their last seven games and end the season with a win–loss record of 3–19. Captain Gary Ablett was named the inaugural Gold Coast Suns Club Champion at the club's awards night in September.

=== 2012: Emergence of Harley Bennell ===
In an attempt to close the gap of the huge losses that the club incurred in 2011, the Suns offered zone pick Dayne Zorko in a three-way trade that resulted in key defender Matthew Warnock joining the Gold Coast. The Gold Coast also used their no.4 pick in the 2011 AFL draft to acquire the first selection in mini-draft. The mini-draft allowed teams to pre-list 17-year-old players for the 2013 season and the Suns used their selection to sign West Australian Jaeger O'Meara. The team then travelled to Arizona in November to complete a two-week high altitude training camp. Coach Guy McKenna labelled the trip a growing experience for the youthful squad. The benefits of the trip were seen almost immediately as majority of the playing group recorded personal bests in January.

After a disappointing NAB Cup campaign, which included a loss to the newly formed GWS Giants, the Suns were woeful in their first round loss to the Adelaide Crows. Losses continued to pile as the Gold Cost fell to St Kilda and Essendon before suffering another loss in QClash3. The season went from bad to worse when Gary Ablett went down injured in the clash with Brisbane. In the absence of Ablett, a silvering lining was discovered by the club during their next two losses as Harley Bennell's talent was unearthed. Bennell caught the attention of the media after a 37 possession game against Fremantle in Round 6.

Still without a win for the season, the Gold Coast entered their Round 7 clash against the Giants with high hopes as their captain Gary Ablett made his return from a knee injury. The heartache continued for the Suns as GWS put in a 5-goal fourth quarter to steal victory. Losses continued to mount for the Suns as their losing streak reached an astonishing 21 matches and began to put coach Guy McKenna's future in question. The Gold Coast showed faith in McKenna by re-signing him for a further two years during the losing streak. Karmichael Hunt would forever book his place in the history books when he kicked an after the siren goal to win a Round 16 game against Richmond. Hunt compared the experience to a Michael Jordan buzzer beating shot.

The club could not continue in their winning fashion and notched up three more losses to Brisbane, Sydney and Melbourne respectively. Round 20 saw the Suns make history in their first ever home win against Greater Western Sydney. An away trip against the premiership favourite Hawks brought the Gold Coast back to earth the following week. A week later the Suns caused the biggest upset their short history as they stunned Carlton at home. The win would lead to Carlton coach Brett Ratten's sacking later in the week. The win would be Gold Coast's third for the season as they finished second last on the ladder. Gary Ablett would once again win the Club Champion award while Harley Bennell would claim second spot in the voting.

=== 2013: Introduction of Jaeger O'Meara ===
On 22 November 2012, Gold Coast chairman John Witheriff announced an ambitious '20-ONE-3' campaign that aimed to deliver 20,000 club members and an AFL premiership within a three-year period. During the 2012 trade period, the Suns once again brokered a deal with Greater Western Sydney in exchange for the number 1 selection in the mini-draft. The Giants received the Suns' no.2 pick for the 2012 AFL draft in return. The mini-draft selection was used to recruit highly touted midfielder Jack Martin to the Gold Coast. Martin would show his commitment to the Gold Coast by signing a five-year contract extension, a year before being eligible to make his AFL debut. The Suns returned to Arizona in November for a preseason training camp that included a 26 kilometres (16 mi) hike through the Grand Canyon. Mixed results were had by the club throughout the 2013 NAB Cup.

After spending the 2012 season in the Gold Coast NEAFL reserves team, much hyped teenager Jaeger O'Meara was named to make his senior debut in Round 1 against St Kilda. He revealed that not being eligible to play in 2012 had built up a year-long wait of excitement for his first game. O'Meara and the Suns would not disappoint and claimed victory over the Saints with a 13-point win in Round 1. An away trip to visit the Sydney Swans the following week would result in a loss but was highlighted by a 25 disposal outing for O'Meara. Back to back losses to Brisbane and Port Adelaide followed before a 44-point win against GWS in Canberra. Charlie Dixon would kick six goals in the match and broke the record for most goals kicked in a game by a Gold Coast player.

The Suns made history in Round 8 when they recorded consecutive victories for the first time against Melbourne and the Western Bulldogs respectively. Jaeger O'Meara would once again dazzle the AFL world when he racked up 30 possessions during a Round 12 loss to Essendon. So impressive was the display from O'Meara that Essendon legend Tim Watson revealed he thought O'Meara could become the greatest player to ever compete in the Australian Football League. West Australian teams Fremantle and West Coast were poised to launch massive bids to lure O'Meara home following his impressive first half of the year. On 18 July it was announced that O'Meara, who was just a quarter of the way through his draftee contract, had committed to the Suns by signing a two-year contract extension which would see him contracted to the Suns until 2016. The club recorded a further two wins later in the year over North Melbourne and Collingwood at home. Captain Gary Ablett led the team to the victory over the Magpies with 49 disposals and two goals to further affirm his Brownlow Medal chances. The win against Collingwood was heralded by the media as the Suns' biggest scalp in their short history.

The Gold Coast would be victorious two more times in 2013 to finish the season with eight wins and placed 14th on the ladder. Captain Gary Ablett Jr was awarded his third successive best and fairest medal at the Suns and a record fifth AFL Most Valuable Player award. On 23 September 2013, Ablett won his second Brownlow Medal, becoming the first Gold Coast player to win the award and only the 14th player in AFL-VFL history to win twice. Ablett received three votes in the final round of the season, beating Geelong's Joel Selwood by one vote and Collingwood's Dane Swan by two votes. First year player Jaeger O'Meara was also awarded the AFL Rising Star award after polling 44 out of a possible 45 votes.

=== 2014: Jack Martin, Ablett's injury and McKenna's sacking ===
Leading into the 2013 AFL draft, head coach Guy McKenna revealed he was looking to sign a rebounding defender to fill a hole in the team. It was highly speculated that the Suns would use the fifth pick in the draft to sign talented Tasmanian defender Kade Kolodjashnij. The speculation became reality when Kolodjashnij was taken by the Gold Coast at pick 5. Big things were expected of the highly touted duo in Kolodjashnij and Jack Martin leading into the 2014 AFL season. Like O'Meara a year before him, Jack Martin was required to spend the entire 2013 season in the Gold Coast's reserves team before being eligible to make his senior debut in 2014.

All eyes were on Jack Martin for the Round 1 clash against Richmond but a shoulder injury in the fifth minute of the game ruled the talented teenage out for a minimum of two months. Despite the injury, the Gold Coast came out victorious against the Tigers by three goals. Mixed results followed as the Gold Coast entered Round 5 with a 2–2 record. The team would then make club history by recording five consecutive victories against Melbourne, Greater Western Sydney, North Melbourne, St Kilda and the Western Bulldogs.

Sitting equal second on the ladder leading into Round 11, the Suns entered a slump and could only manage two wins in seven games which would see them drop out of the top 8 for the first time throughout the season. The Round 14 clash against Geelong saw the return of Jack Martin and six-goal best on ground performance from Harley Bennell. Two weeks later the Suns hosted Collingwood in front of a record crowd at Metricon Stadium. In what would prove to be a significant moment for the team's 2014 campaign, Gary Ablett Jr suffered a season-ending injury just prior to half time. Following the victory over the Magpies, the Suns only managed to record one victory in their last seven games to finish 12th on the ladder at the conclusion of the 2014 season.

On 28 August, Rugby convert Karmichael Hunt announced he was leaving the game of Australian rules football after five years service for the Gold Coast, citing his inability to keep up with the physical demands. A day later it was announced that Hunt would be joining the Queensland Reds Rugby Union team. After the conclusion of the 2014 AFL Grand Final pressure began to mount on head coach Guy McKenna as internal club expectation were not reached in 2014. On 30 September the Gold Coast Football Club announced the removal of McKenna as head coach just days before the free agency/trade period began.

== 2015–2017: Rodney Eade era ==
Gold Coast list manager Scott Clayton targeted All-Australian defender Nick Malceski and Hawthorn midfielder Mitch Hallahan prior to the conclusion of the 2014 season and sought out to secure their signatures during the off season. Although the club was without a senior coach at the time, both Malceski and Hallahan elected to join the Suns. The club had been heavily linked to former Essendon senior coach Mark Thompson through periods of the off season but the speculation never came to fruition. On 30 October 2014 it was announced that Rodney Eade would take over as head coach of the Gold Coast. The club continued to improve its playing list by adding key position player Peter Wright to the team with the eighth pick in the 2014 AFL draft. Unlike previous years, the Suns chose to conduct preseason training on the Gold Coast in order to help the new recruits adjust to their surroundings.

== 2018–2023: Stuart Dew era ==
Following the dismissal of Rodney Eade, Stuart Dew was appointed senior coach ahead of the 2018 AFL season. In his first season, the Suns would finish 17th before regressing the next year to earn the club's second wooden spoon—the first since their inaugural season. In 2020, the Suns were one of the focus clubs featured in the Amazon Prime Video documentary series Making Their Mark. The 2022 season would see the Suns improve to equal their best ever ladder position to that point of twelfth. Following disappointing losses in 2023, Dew would step down following round 17.

== 2024–present: Damien Hardwick era & first finals appearance ==
After stepping down as Richmond coach after several disappointing seasons following their 2017, 2019 & 2020 premierships, Damien Hardwick was appointed senior coach of the Suns for the 2024 AFL season. In his inaugural season as coach, Hardwick took the Suns to thirteenth, up from fifteenth the previous year. In the 2025 AFL season, Hardwick led the Suns to seventh on the ladder, seeing the Suns make finals for the first time. The Suns would defeat Fremantle on the road at Optus Stadium by a point before losing to eventual premiers Brisbane in the inaugural QClash final by 53 points the following week. In 2026, the Suns signed Norm Smith Medallist and Melbourne premiership player Christian Petracca as they seek their inaugural flag. The Suns were one of the clubs focused in the 2026 Amazon Prime Video documentary series The Final Siren: Inside the AFL.

== Results over the years ==
| Season | Senior Coach | Home & Away Season | | | | | Finals Series | | |
| Season | Senior Coach | Wins | Losses | Draws | % | Ladder Position | Wins | Losses | Outcome |
|---|---|---|---|---|---|---|---|---|---|
| 2011 | Guy McKenna | 3 | 19 | 0 | 56.3 | 17th out of 17 | Failed to qualify. | | |
| 2012 | Guy McKenna | 3 | 19 | 0 | 60.8 | 17th out of 18 | Failed to qualify. | | |
| 2013 | Guy McKenna | 8 | 14 | 0 | 91.7 | 14th out of 18 | Failed to qualify. | | |
| 2014 | Guy McKenna | 10 | 12 | 0 | 93.7 | 12th out of 18 | Failed to qualify. | | |
| 2015 | Rodney Eade | 4 | 17 | 1 | 72.9 | 16th out of 18 | Failed to qualify. | | |
| 2016 | Rodney Eade | 6 | 16 | 0 | 78.2 | 15th out of 18 | Failed to qualify. | | |
| 2017* | Rodney Eade | 6 | 16 | 0 | 76.0 | 17th out of 18 | Failed to qualify. | | |
| 2018 | Stuart Dew | 4 | 18 | 0 | 59.9 | 17th out of 18 | Failed to qualify. | | |
| 2019 | Stuart Dew | 3 | 19 | 0 | 60.5 | 18th out of 18 | Failed to qualify. | | |
| 2020 | Stuart Dew | 5 | 11 | 1 | 90.6 | 14th out of 18 | Failed to qualify. | | |
| 2021 | Stuart Dew | 7 | 15 | 0 | 76.8 | 16th out of 18 | Failed to qualify. | | |
| 2022 | Stuart Dew | 10 | 12 | 0 | 102.8 | 12th out of 18 | Failed to qualify. | | |
| 2023** | Stuart Dew | 9 | 14 | 0 | 91.7 | 15th out of 18 | Failed to qualify. | | |
| 2024 | Damien Hardwick | 11 | 12 | 0 | 99.1 | 13th out of 18 | Failed to qualify. | | |
| 2025 | Damien Hardwick | 15 | 8 | 0 | 124.9 | 7th out of 18 | 1 | 1 | Lost to Brisbane in Semi Final |
| 2026 | Damien Hardwick | TBD | TBD | TBD | TBD | TBD | TBD | TBD | TBD |
| Average | | 6.9 | 14.8 | 0.1 | 82.4 | 15th out of 18 | 0.1 | 0.1 | |

*Eade was stepped down following Round 20.

**Dew stepped down following Round 17.
