= Ben Cavarra =

Australian rules footballer

Personal information
- Born: 20 December 1995 (age 30)
- Original team: Williamstown(VFL)/ Frankston(VFL)/Eastern Ranges (TAC Cup)
- Draft: No. 45, 2018 national draft
- Debut: Round 1, 2020, Western Bulldogs vs. Collingwood, at Marvel Stadium
- Height: 173 cm (5 ft 8 in)
- Weight: 72 kg (159 lb)
- Position: Small forward

Club information
- Current club: Box Hill
- Number: 52

Playing career^{1}
Years	Club	Games (Goals)
2020–2021	Western Bulldogs	4 (4)
- ^{1} Playing statistics correct to the end of 2021.

Career highlights
- Morrish Medal: 2013; 2017 VFL team of the year.; 2022 VFL team of the year.; 2022 VFL team of the year Captain

Ben Cavarra (born 20 December 1995) is a former Australian rules footballer who played for the Western Bulldogs in the Australian Football League (AFL).

== Career ==
=== Juniors ===
Cavarra is from Lysterfield, a suburb of Melbourne, and was educated at St Joseph's in nearby Ferntree Gully. He spent a successful stint of junior football at the Eastern Ranges in the TAC Cup, starting by winning the 2012 Pennington Medal (the club's best and fairest award) as a bottom-age player. A strong 2013 season followed; Cavarra captained the Ranges to a premiership, winning the TAC Medal as best on ground in the grand final. He also tied for the Morrish Medal (the competition's best and fairest) on 16 votes, and won a second consecutive Pennington Medal, a feat that had previously been matched only by Sam Mitchell and Rory Sloane. Cavarra also represented Vic Metro at that year's AFL Under 18 Championships. He missed out on attending the national draft combine, instead attending the Victorian session, where he ran a 20-metre sprint in under three seconds, a personal best.

"I can't change my height, I've just got to look at the positives from it ... I'm able to be quicker around the ground and to have a low centre of gravity and be able to put my body on the line"

— Cavarra after being overlooked in the 2013 AFL draft

=== VFL ===
Cavarra was not selected in the 2013 AFL draft, despite his accolades; clubs were chiefly concerned about his short stature (he stood at just 173 centimetres (5 ft 8 in)), but also his lack of speed and kicking accuracy. He considered joining a VFL team, and decided on the Frankston Dolphins, as the club was not affiliated with an AFL team, meaning he would have a greater chance of playing in their senior side. Cavarra had largely played as a midfielder prior to joining Frankston, but expressed a desire to take on a forward line role.

Over three years at the club, he played 51 games and kicked 44 goals, and won Frankston's best and fairest in 2014 and 2015 (finishing runner-up in 2016), earning interest from West Australian Football League clubs. Despite Cavarra's strong performances, he continued to be overlooked in AFL drafts. Frankston, in financial difficulties, decided not to compete in the 2017 VFL season. Cavarra joined another VFL team, Williamstown, where he switched to a small forward position. He kicked 66 goals in 40 matches over two seasons; in both, he led the club's goalscoring and was named in the VFL's team of the year.

=== AFL ===
Cavarra was selected by the Western Bulldogs with pick 45 in the 2018 national draft, marking his first successful nomination after five failures. His first season was marred by injury; he could only play 12 VFL games after suffering hamstring and quad tears, fractured ribs, which caused a minor cut to his liver, and a broken scapula. Over his off-season he practised Pilates sessions to strengthen his body, ensuring he could complete pre-season training. He made his senior debut in the opening round of the 2020 season, scoring a goal with his first kick. Cavarra was delisted at the end of 2021 season.

=== VFL return ===
After being delisted by the Bulldogs, Cavarra signed with the Box Hill Hawks for the 2022 VFL season. In a year in which he finished third in the VFL goalkicking, Cavarra and teammate Fergus Greene were selected as forward pockets in the VFL Team of the Year. Cavarra was also named captain of the VFL Team of the Year.

Cavarra suffered an ACL injury while training in the 2023 VFL pre-season, preventing him from playing any games that season.

He has also served as an assistant coach at the club since 2024.

In 2026 he accepted a role as an assistant coach for the Hawthorn's AFLW team for the 2026 season.

Away from the major leagues, Ben has played for Bentleigh in the Southern Football Netball League.

== Statistics ==
Statistics are correct to the end of 2021 season

Legend
G	Goals	K	Kicks	D	Disposals	T	Tackles
B	Behinds	H	Handballs	M	Marks

Season	Team	No.	Games	Totals							Averages (per game)						
Season	Team	No.	Games	G	B	K	H	D	M	T	G	B	K	H	D	M	T
2019	Western Bulldogs	25	0	—	—	—	—	—	—	—	—	—	—	—	—	—	—
2020 (Note: The 2020 season was played with 17 home-and-away matches per team (down from 22) and 16-minute quarters with time on (down from 20-minute quarters with time on) due to the impact of the COVID-19 pandemic.)	Western Bulldogs	25	3	4	3	15	10	25	5	8	1.3	1.0	5.0	3.3	8.8	1.7	2.7
2021	Western Bulldogs	25	1	0	0	1	0	1	1	0	0.0	0.0	1.0	0.0	1.0	1.0	0.0
Career			4	4	3	16	10	26	6	9	1.0	0.8	4.0	2.5	6.5	1.5	2.3

== Personal life ==
Cavarra studied a teaching degree at Deakin University, working part-time as a teaching assistant during his course. Before being drafted into the AFL, he worked at St. Peters Primary School. After his AFL debut, he cited education as a career to potentially return to after finishing with football.
