= Christian Moraes =

Australian rules footballer

Personal information
- Full name: Christian Moraes
- Born: 8 November 2006 (age 19)
- Original team: Eastern Ranges (Talent League)
- Draft: No. 38, 2024 national draft
- Debut: Round 2, 2025, Port Adelaide vs. Richmond, at Adelaide Oval
- Height: 183 cm (6 ft 0 in)
- Position: Midfielder

Club information
- Current club: Port Adelaide
- Number: 11

Playing career^{1}
Years	Club	Games (Goals)
2025–	Port Adelaide	26 (5)
- ^{1} Playing statistics correct to the end of 2026.

Christian Moraes (born 8 November 2006) is a professional Australian rules footballer who plays for the Port Adelaide Football Club in the Australian Football League (AFL). He has been described as a versatile, hard-working midfielder with clean hands and the ability to score.

== Early life ==
Moraes attended Salesian College Chadstone. He played for Eastern Ranges in the Talent League and competed in the AFL National Championships for Vic Metro. He also made his VFL debut for Box Hill in round 21 against Werribee. He supported the Sydney Swans in the AFL.

== AFL career ==
After being picked as a potential top 10 draft selection at the beginning of the year, Moraes was drafted by Port Adelaide with pick 38 in the 2024 national draft. He made his debut for Port in round 2 against Richmond, and kicked his first career goal in round 13 against the GWS Giants. He has also played six games for Port's SANFL side, kicking two goals. Moraes signed a contract extension with Port Adelaide at the end of the 2025 season, keeping him at the club until 2027.

== Statistics ==
Updated to the end of round 22, 2026.

Legend
G	Goals	K	Kicks	D	Disposals	T	Tackles
B	Behinds	H	Handballs	M	Marks

Season	Team	No.	Games	Totals							Averages (per game)							Votes
Season	Team	No.	Games	G	B	K	H	D	M	T	G	B	K	H	D	M	T	Votes
2025	Port Adelaide	31	14	2	2	74	97	171	39	29	0.1	0.1	5.3	6.9	12.2	2.8	2.1	0
2026	Port Adelaide	11	11	2	2	68	82	150	31	19	0.2	0.2	6.2	7.5	13.6	2.8	1.7	0
Career			25	4	4	142	179	321	70	48	0.2	0.2	5.7	7.2	12.8	2.8	1.9	0
