= Dylan Clarke =

Australian rules footballer

Personal information
- Born: 6 September 1998 (age 28)
- Original team: Eastern Ranges (TAC Cup)
- Draft: No. 63, 2016 national draft
- Height: 187 cm (6 ft 2 in)
- Weight: 87 kg (192 lb)
- Position: Midfielder

Club information
- Current club: Essendon
- Number: 37

Playing career^{1}
Years	Club	Games (Goals)
2018–2021	Essendon	24 (6)
- ^{1} Playing statistics correct to the end of round 23, 2021.

Career highlights
- 2019 AFL Rising Star: nominee

Dylan Clarke (born 6 September 1998) is a former professional Australian rules footballer playing for the Essendon Football Club in the Australian Football League (AFL). He is the younger brother of Sydney's Ryan Clarke. He was educated at St Joseph's College, Ferntree Gully and Melbourne Grammar School.

Clarke was recruited with pick 63 in the 2016 national draft. He made his senior debut against the Geelong Cats in round 9 of the 2018 AFL season.

He was called up for his second game in Round 11, 2019. Clarke lined up on Carlton captain and Brownlow Medal favorite Patrick Cripps, and kept him to the quietest game of his entire career, as one of the best players on the ground.

He played in Essendon's next game in Round 13 against Hawthorn, once more playing a tagging role, holding Hawthorn star Jager O'Meara to 14 disposals to three quarter time and 23 for the match, while gathering 23 possessions himself. He was again one of the best players on the ground, and was recognized with the NAB Rising Star nomination for round 13.

Clarke was delisted by the Bombers at the end of 2021. In 2022 he played for SANFL club Woodville West Torrens, before moving to VFL club Port Melbourne in 2023.
