= Brad Nicholson =

Australian rules footballer

Personal information
- Full name: Brad Nicholson
- Born: 4 June 1974 (age 52)
- Original teams: Doncaster Heights, Eastern Ranges
- Draft: 33rd, 1993 Pre-Season draft
- Height: 186 cm (6 ft 1 in)
- Weight: 82 kg (181 lb)
- Position: Defender

Playing career^{1}
Years	Club	Games (Goals)
1993–1996	Footscray	34 (1)
- ^{1} Playing statistics correct to the end of 1996.

Career highlights
- AFL Rising Star nominee: 1993

Brad Nicholson (born 4 June 1974) is a former Australian rules footballer who played with Footscray in the Australian Football League (AFL).

Nicholson, originally from Doncaster Heights, was recruited from TAC Cup team the Eastern Ranges, he was primarily a back pocket defender but was used at time as a fullback early in his career.

He was a nominated for the 1993 AFL Rising Star, after playing his four league game against the West Coast Eagles. His most productive year came in 1995 when he made 16 appearances, but it was his penultimate season.
