= Blake Grima =

Australian rules footballer (born 1984)

Personal information
- Full name: Blake Grima
- Born: 8 June 1984 (age 42)
- Original team: Eastern Ranges
- Height: 180 cm (5 ft 11 in)
- Weight: 84 kg (185 lb)

Playing career^{1}
Years	Club	Games (Goals)
2004–2008	North Melbourne	15 (3)
- ^{1} Playing statistics correct to the end of 2008.

Blake Grima (born 8 June 1984) is an Australian rules footballer who played for North Melbourne in the Australian Football League (AFL) between 2004 and 2008.

He was drafted from the Eastern Ranges club in the TAC Cup with the 38th selection in the 2002 AFL draft. He played 12 games in five seasons at the Kangaroos before he was delisted at the end of the 2007 season, but redrafted with the 72nd selection in the 2007 AFL draft. He only played another three games in 2008 before he was delisted again.

After being delisted by the Kangaroos he switched clubs in the Victorian Football League from North Ballarat Football Club to Port Melbourne Football Club.
