= 1993 AFL Rising Star =

Australian rules football award

1993 Norwich AFL Rising Star
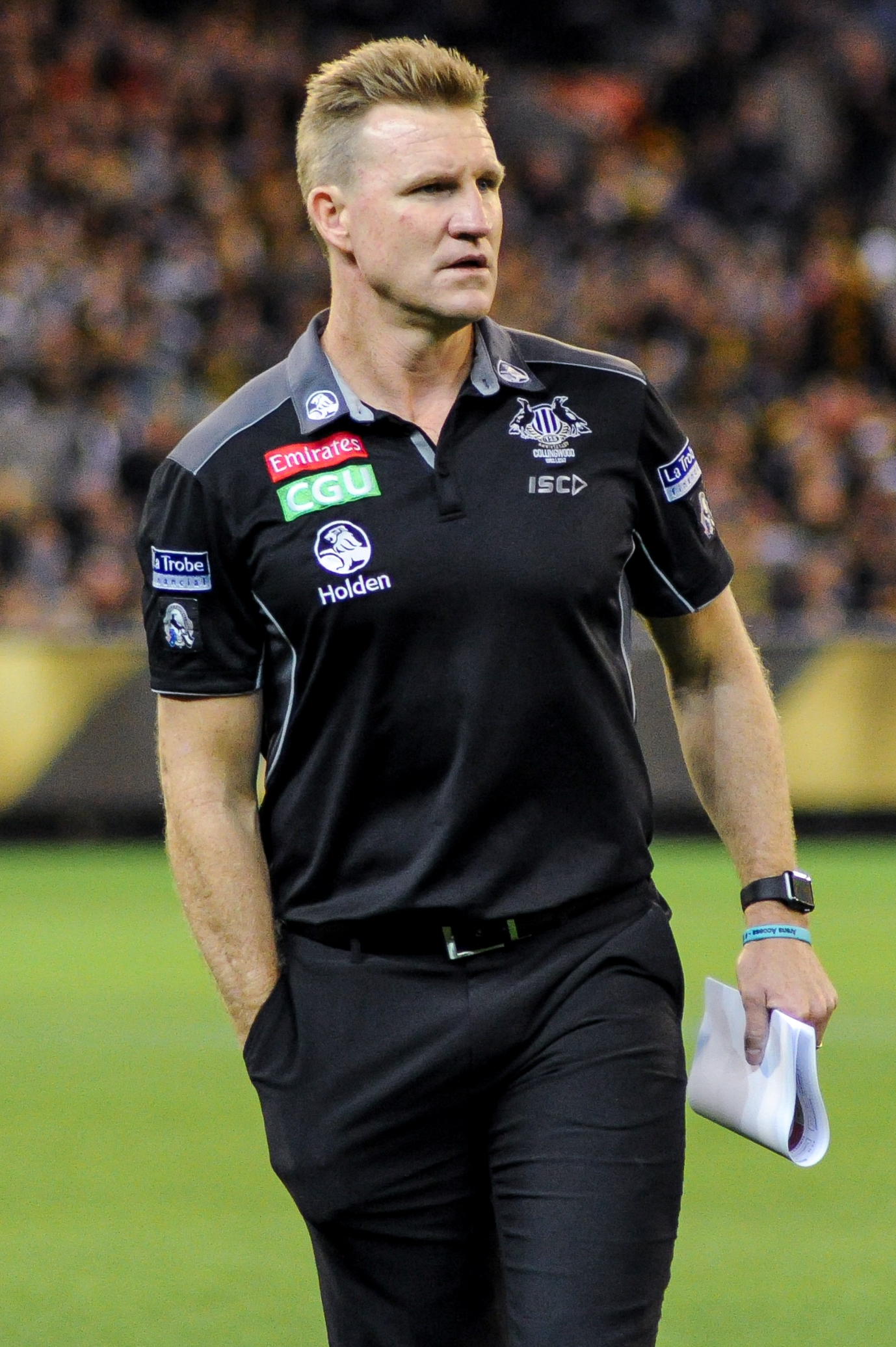
- Nathan Buckley, 1993 winner
- Sponsored by: Norwich
- Country: Australia
- Rising Star: Nathan Buckley (Brisbane Bears)

The Norwich AFL Rising Star award is given annually to a standout young player in the Australian Football League. This was the first season the medal was awarded and the award went to Nathan Buckley in his debut, and only, season at the Brisbane Bears.

== Eligibility ==
Every round, an Australian Football League rising star nomination is given to a standout young player. To be eligible for the award, a player must be under 21 on January 1 of that year, have played 10 or fewer senior games and not been suspended during the season. At the end of the year, one of the 22 nominees is the winner of award. The nominated players from 1993 are considered to be one of the most successful of all years.

== Nominations ==
Round	Player	Club
1	Peter Everitt	St Kilda
2	Shane Crawford	Hawthorn
3	Nathan Chapman	Brisbane Bears
4	Joe Misiti	Essendon
5	Scott West	Footscray
6	David Neitz	Melbourne
7	Nathan Buckley	Brisbane Bears
8	James Hird	Essendon
9	Dustin Fletcher	Essendon
10	Matthew Richardson	Richmond
11	Brodie Atkinson	St Kilda
12	Glenn Archer	North Melbourne
13	Saverio Rocca	Collingwood
14	Darren Kowal	Melbourne
15	Duncan Kellaway	Richmond
16	Mark Ricciuto	Adelaide
17	Ilija Grgic	Footscray
18	Ang Christou	Carlton
19	Ricky Olarenshaw	Essendon
20	Mark Mercuri	Essendon
21	Brad Nicholson	Footscray
22	Leigh Colbert	Geelong
Source: AFL Record Season Guide 2015
