= Ilija Grgic =

Australian rules footballer

Personal information
- Full name: Ilija Grgic
- Born: 5 March 1972 (age 54)
- Original team: MHS Old Boys
- Height: 203 cm (6 ft 8 in)
- Weight: 106 kg (234 lb)
- Position: Ruckman

Playing career^{1}
Years	Club	Games (Goals)
1993 – 1996	Footscray	62 (92)
1997 – 1998	West Coast	23 (15)
1999	Essendon	2 (0)
Total		87 (107)
- ^{1} Playing statistics correct to the end of 1999.

Career highlights
- AFL Rising Star nominee: 1993

Ilija Grgic (born 5 March 1972) is a former Australian rules footballer who played with Footscray, the West Coast Eagles and Essendon in the Australian Football League (AFL) during the 1990s.

Grgic was recruited from Melbourne High School Old Boys and made nine appearances in his debut season in 1993, for a return of 19 goals. He also received a nomination for the 1993 AFL Rising Star award and kicked a bag of six goals in a win over North Melbourne at the MCG. An injury to Scott Wynd in 1994 gave Grgic was role of number one ruckman at Footscray and he was awarded nine Brownlow Medal votes for his efforts over the course of the season, finishing with 217 hit-outs and 27 goals. He was Footscray's second most successful forward in 1995 with 39 goals and still had over 100 hit-outs for the year. His goal tally included three majors in the qualifying final against Geelong.

Footscray traded him to West Coast for Luke Trew at the end of the 1996 AFL season and he was the regular ruckman for the Eagles in 1997. However he suffered back problems in 1998 and played most of his football for Peel Thunder in the West Australian Football League (WAFL). During his time at West Coast he was involved in a drugs controversy when he tested positive for a banned substances but it turned out to be cough medicine.

After being let go by West Coast, Grgic was picked up by Essendon with the 56th pick of the 1998 AFL draft. He continued to struggle with injury and could manage just two AFL appearances but did play in the Reserves Premiership that season.

Since retiring from football, Grgic has had a successful professional career in the oil and gas industry, including serving as engineering manager at the Shell refinery in Geelong.
