= Jack Dinatale =

Australian rules footballer

Personal information
- Full name: Jack Dinatale
- Born: 12 December 1958 (age 67)
- Original team: Spotswood
- Height: 173 cm (5 ft 8 in)
- Weight: 67 kg (148 lb)

Playing career^{1}
Years	Club	Games (Goals)
1974–79	Footscray	11 (5)
- ^{1} Playing statistics correct to the end of 1979.

Jack Dinatale (Note: also spelled Di Natale) (born 12 December 1958) is a former Australian rules footballer who played with Footscray in the Victorian Football League (VFL).

Dinatale was a talented junior footballer, twice winning the Morrish Medal (in 1974 and 1976) as the best and fairest player in the VFL under-19s competition.
