= St Joseph's College, Ferntree Gully =

St Joseph's College

Location
- 5 Brenock Park Drive; Ferntree Gully, Victoria 3156; Australia; 37°53′30″S 145°17′47″E

Information
- Type: Private
- Motto: Agite quae didicistis Translating to: Put into practice those things which you have learned
- Religious affiliation: Roman Catholic (Salesians of Don Bosco)
- Established: 1965
- Founders: Silvio Quaranta; Linus Donohue
- Rector: Jim Acreman sdb Peter Tran sdb
- Principal: Catherine Livingstone
- Grades: 7–12
- Gender: boys
- Enrollment: 1060 (2016)
- Colours: Yellow and blue
- Affiliation: Associated Catholic Colleges
- Website: www.stjosephs.com.au

St Joseph's College is a Salesian Roman Catholic boys' secondary school in the outer-eastern suburb of Ferntree Gully, Melbourne, Victoria, Australia.

== History ==
The college's history is closely tied with the Salesians of Lysterfield (indeed, the parish priest of Ferntree Gully wanted the school to be called Don Bosco). The Archdiocese of Melbourne founded St Joseph's in 1965 as one of its strategic places. Classes began in February of that year with 70 students in Years 7 and 8. Most students came from the parishes of Belgrave, Ferntree Gully, Scoresby, Boronia, and Bayswater. The original building had three classrooms and a storeroom, and every successive year a class was filled up. The school was initially known as St Joseph's Regional College and drew students from as far afield as Gembrook and Pakenham.

In 2005 St Joseph's opened the Valdocco campus, solely for Year 9 students. Located at the rear of the property, separate from the main campus, Valdocco features special facilities such as a gym, a vineyard, and an animal farm with alpacas and chickens, in addition to standard classrooms for core education. Year 9 students who partake in viticulture harvest grapes from the vineyard, which are made into wine. Students who choose to participate in animal husbandry are taught how to care for and maintain animals, and work with the alpacas and chickens. All Year 9 students are involved in the Discovery program, which employs practical work such as gardening, construction, and landscaping.

In 2013, the Chieri Learning Centre replaced the school's library after its renovation. The centre features a range of furniture and spaces for students to work and collaborate, as well as library books and computers.

The statue in front of the reception building depicting Jesus Christ with St Joseph was sculpted by Brother Michael Harris sdb, and unveiled on St Joseph's Day in 2013.

In 2014, the second floor Year 7 classrooms were renovated to become the Becchi Centre. Similar to the Chieri Centre, Becchi joins the Year 7 homerooms together, doubling the students up in larger classrooms.

== Curriculum ==
The curriculum is based on the Salesian Preventative System, and as such nurturing relationships between teacher and student are important. Religious Education from Years 7–12 is a compulsory subject, and other subjects are informed by the Victorian Essential Learning Standards and the Victorian Curriculum and Assessment Authority.

The LEAP programme was introduced in 1997 for Year 7 students, and as it was successful was introduced the following year for Year 8 students. Their classrooms are off-limits to the rest of the school, and team teaching takes place. That is, one teacher is up the front and the other helps the students around the classroom. Students take a common curriculum at this stage with Religious Education, English, Humanities, Mathematics, Art, Science, Music and Drama. Italian and Japanese are taught for one semester each.

Year 9 students who achieve a B average in the first semester (and confirmed in the second semester) may take a Unit 1/2 subject as part of the Accelerated Program. This is as per the Acceleration Policy. The results entry criteria in the case of a small Year 11/12 subject is a C average in English and a B average in other subjects. Year 9 is also a transition year into the Middle School, with core subjects and elective subjects including Multimedia and Agricultural Science. Civics and Commerce is a compulsory subject. Year 10 students move into the senior curriculum and choose four electives including a VCE study. As of 2005, the Year 9 students will have their own campus and innovative curriculum. The Occhiena Centre provides educational support for students in Years 7–12 and extension learning program for students in Years 7–8. Students in Years 7–12 are able to participate in extension or accelerated learning programs.

The Senior School offers VCE, VCAL and VET studies.

Moving into the next grade is controlled by the Promotions Policy and there is a committee for this. If they fail to meet the standards for passing, they attend an Academic Advancement meeting and argue their case for promotion which may include factors like family history and resilience.

St Joseph's College offers its senior students the Victorian Certificate of Education (VCE).

VCE results 2012–2025
Year	Rank	Median study score	Scores of 40+ (%)	Cohort size
2012	176	30	7	152
2013	161	31	6.2	198
2014	147	31	7.2	253
2015	169	30	8.1	258
2016	205	30	4.3	267
2017	178	30	6.4	270
2018	181	30	5.7	257
2019	202	30	4.5	229
2020	107	32	7.9	214
2021	128	31	9.2	201
2022	196	30	5.5	209
2023	111	32	6.4	208
2024	100	32	8.8	237
2025	147	31	6.2	184

== Co-curricular activities ==
St. Josephs has four houses colours, composed of students from all year levels. The houses compete in school events, such as the Swimming and Athletics Carnivals.

House	Colour	Named after
Bosco	Yellow	John Bosco
Magone	Blue	Michael Magone
Rua	Green	Michael Rua
Savio	Red	Dominic Savio

School camps are conducted annually from Years 7 to 9. Year 7 students stay for two nights at the Salesian camp in Dromana. Year 8 students camp for one night in Bunyip State Park, Gembrook. The Year 9 "survival camp" consists of camping for six nights in Baw Baw National Park, which includes activities such as river rafting, hiking, abseiling, and mountain biking.

St Joseph's runs trips to Kiribati once a year, which are available to boys in Year 10, 11 and 12. Year 10 and 11 students who study Japanese or Italian are given the opportunity to go on biennial school trips to those respective countries, which alternate every year.

In Years 7, 8, 10, 11, and 12, boys also participate in Retreat Days once per year, which are held at the Salesian House in Lysterfield. Students learn about goal-setting and reflection, and themes may include Leadership, Relationships, Community and Faith in Action.

=== Sport ===
St Joseph's is a member of the Associated Catholic Colleges (ACC).

==== ACC premierships ====
St Joseph's has won the following ACC premierships.

- Lawn Bowls – 2017
- Volleyball – 2020

== Sister school relationships ==
=== Local relationships ===
School	Location
Mater Christi College	Belgrave, Victoria

St Joseph's is closely tied with Mater Christi College in Belgrave, a nearby Catholic secondary school for girls. Community days between the two schools are held annually, for each year level from 7 to 9. Inter-school activities such as a debating competition and annual productions are also held between the two schools.

=== International relationships ===
Country	School Name
Italy	Don Bosco Secondary School in Turin, Piedmont
Japan	Meikei Gakuen in Tsukuba, Ibaraki

School cultural trips from St Joseph's to Italy and Japan include visits to the sister schools in those countries, and homestay arrangements with families. Longer-term student exchanges are also offered between the schools.

== Controversy ==
=== Father Julian Fox ===
Father Julian Fox, the Principal of St Josephs College from 1983 to 1986 and 1994 to 1998 was found guilty of buggery (sodomy), indecent assault and common assault in April 2015.

== Notable alumni ==
- Kristian Bardsley – North Melbourne/St Kilda player
- Joshua Begley – Essendon Football Club player
- Ryan Clarke – Sydney Swans Football Club player
- Dylan Clarke – Essendon Football Club player
- Darren Crocker – North Melbourne Football Club premiership player and assistant coach
- Damien Hardwick – Essendon Football Club and Port Adelaide Football Club premiership player and Richmond Football Club senior premiership coach
- Matthew Larkin – North Melbourne Football Club player/captain
- Matthew Lobbe – Port Adelaide Football Club player
- Cam O'Shea – Port Adelaide Football Club player
- Jaidyn Stephenson – Collingwood Football Club player
- David Stiff – Melbourne Tigers basketball player
- Ben Cavarra – Western Bulldogs player
- Mac Andrew – Gold Coast Suns footballer
- Jordin Leiu - Newtown Jets and Fiji national rugby league team Player
- Sam Hayes - Port Adelaide Football Club Player
