= Morrish Medal =

- Awarded for: The best and fairest player in the Talent League Boys
- Country: Australia
- Presented by: Australian Football League
- First award: 1947
- Currently held by: Brodie Atkins
- Website: Morrish Medal

The Morrish Medal is an award presented to the best and fairest player in the premier Victorian underage Australian rules football competition during the home-and-away season. Boasting an uninterrupted lineage from 1947 onwards, the medal is currently awarded to the highest vote-getter in the Talent League Boys competition.

== History ==
The Morrish Medal was first inaugurated in 1947, the year after the formation of the Victorian Football League's thirds competition. Named in honour of reserve grade treasurer Tom Morrish, who had held the position since 1922, the medal was to be awarded to the best-performing player across the season as adjudged by the field umpires. This continued throughout the history of the League's thirds, which was renamed to the under-19s in 1960. When the under-19s competition was wound up at the conclusion of the 1991 Australian Football League season, to be replaced by the new Victorian State Football League under-18s competition, the decision was made to continue awarding the Morrish Medal in that new competition.

== Voting format ==
In the style of the Brownlow Medal and Gardiner Medal medals already awarded in the seniors and seconds competitions respectively, the presiding field umpire would cast a 3–2–1 vote at the conclusion of each match. The player with the most votes tallied following the end of the home-and-away season would then be presented with the medal. The initial voting method continues to this day, albeit with multiple field umpires now conferring to present a single set of votes for each match.

Until 1981, a count back rule identical to that of the Brownlow was used to split winners based on the amount of three-vote games they were awarded, followed by two-vote games, etc. until a solitary winner could be found. In 1992, the League recognised three players who initially lost by count back – Jim McGowan (1961), Phillip Friedman (1974) and Jack Dinatale (1976) – and awarded them retrospective medals.

== Winners by season ==
Year	Player	Club	Votes	Ref.
1947	Alan Dale	Essendon	[?]	
1948	Ray Harvey	Melbourne	22	
1949	Arthur Harbrow	St Kilda	[?]	
1950	Noel Alford	North Melbourne	23	
1951	Frank Williams	Hawthorn	15	
1952	Peter McPhee	Footscray	17	
1953	Dick Pratt	Carlton	23	
1954	Alf Clarke	Carlton	20	
1955	Dick Job	Carlton	18	
1956	Garry Rasmussen	Hawthorn	17	
1957	Peter O'Reilly	South Melbourne	30	
1958	Norman Bowler	North Melbourne	17	
1959	Dom Glassenbury	Fitzroy	16	
1960	Gerard Ryan	Footscray	[?]	
1961	Terry Johnston	Melbourne	15	
1961	Jim McGowan (Note: Medal was awarded retrospectively, as a countback rule was applied until 1980.)	South Melbourne	15	
1962	Kevin Egan	Essendon	[?]	
1963	John Schram	Geelong	[?]	
1964	Peter Gowans	North Melbourne	18	
1965	Russell Petherbridge	St Kilda	[?]	
1966	Bruce Wright	Fitzroy	16	
1967	Maurie Gale	Carlton	17	
1968	Paul Callery	Melbourne	25	
1969	Bill Gehling	Richmond	17	
1970	Ken Marks	Fitzroy	25	
1971	Tim O'Malley	Carlton	21	
1972 (Note: Medal was adjudged a tie and shared between both players as they could not be split by the countback rule.)	Vin Catoggio	Carlton	23	
1972	Ian Kilmartin	North Melbourne	23	
1973	Russell Bruerton	South Melbourne	20	
1974 (Note: Medal was initially adjudged a tie and shared between Bruerton and Dinatale as they could not be split by the countback rule.)	Russell Bruerton	South Melbourne	22	
1974	Jack Dinatale	Footscray	22	
1974	Phillip Friedman	Melbourne	22	
1975	Brian Jones	South Melbourne	[?]	
1976	Jack Dinatale	Footscray	20	
1976	Craig Jamieson	Richmond	20	
1977	Darren Williams	Essendon	20	
1978	Andrew McPhie	Fitzroy	19	
1978	Stephen Simpson	North Melbourne	19	
1979	Peter Banks	Collingwood	30	
1980	Peter Lane	Essendon	[?]	
1981	Adrian Battiston	Melbourne	37	
1982	Les Bamblett	Melbourne	17	
1983	Greg Healy	Melbourne	17	
1984	Tony Liberatore	North Melbourne	22	
1985	Frank Zoccali	Essendon	25	
1986	David Ross	North Melbourne	21	
1987	Wayne Schwass	North Melbourne	17	
1988	Tim McGrath	North Melbourne	21	
1989	Brad Davies	Essendon	18	
1990	Brendan Roberson	Carlton	14	
1990	Clinton Watson	North Melbourne	14	
1991	Gary Stevens	Sydney	[?]	
1992	Brad Smith	Northern Knights	11	
1993	Dean Watson	Southern Stingrays	25	
1994	Gary Moorcroft	Northern Knights	17	
1995	Paul Hood	Geelong Falcons	26	
1996	Nathan Brown	Bendigo Pioneers	21	
1997	Derek Murray	Murray Bushrangers	20	
1998	Lenny Hayes	NSW/ACT Rams	21	
1999	Matthew Stolarczyk	Gippsland Power	21	
2000	David Rodan	Calder Cannons	25	
2001	David Rodan	Calder Cannons	29	
2002	Luke Shackleton	Tassie Mariners	22	
2003	Mungara Brown	Northern Knights	25	
2004	Matthew Bate	Eastern Ranges	21	
2005	Fortunato Caruso	Calder Cannons	22	
2006	Fortunato Caruso	Calder Cannons	22	
2007	Matthew Kreuzer	Northern Knights	19	
2008	Jarryd Blair	Gippsland Power	18	
2008	Farran Priest	Murray Bushrangers	18	
2009	Anton Woods	Northern Knights	24	
2010	Dyson Heppell	Gippsland Power	21	
2010	Jackson Sketcher	Sandringham Dragons	21	
2011	Alex Benbow	Dandenong Stingrays	22	
2012	Nick Graham	Gippsland Power	17	
2013	George Cameron	Geelong Falcons	17	
2013	Ben Cavarra	Eastern Ranges	17	
2013	Jacob Chisari	Bendigo Pioneers	17	
2013	Josh Scott	Gippsland Power	17	
2014	Alex Carr	Gippsland Power	17	
2015	Clayton Oliver	Murray Bushrangers	15	
2016	Hugh McCluggage	North Ballarat Rebels	16	
2017	Jack Higgins	Oakleigh Chargers	22	
2018	Liam Stocker	Sandringham Dragons	19	
2019	Lucas Rocci	Western Jets	17	
2020	not awarded due to COVID-19 pandemic			
2021	Flynn Lakey	Calder Cannons	12	
2021	Josh Rentsch	Greater Western Victoria Rebels	12	
2022	Taj Campbell-Farrell	Dandenong Stingrays	18	
2022	Lachlan Cowan	Tasmania Devils	18	
2023	Patrick Hughes	Geelong Falcons	18	
2023	Colby McKercher	Tasmania Devils	18	
2024	Xavier Lindsay	Gippsland Power	21	
2025	Brodie Atkins	Gippsland Power	20	
2026	Harvie Cooke	Northern Knights	23	

== Ineligible players who polled more votes than winner ==
A player guilty of an offence deemed worthy of a suspension is ineligible to win the Morrish Medal.

Player	Club	Year	Votes	Outcome
Daryl Vernon	Richmond	1978	19	Suspended; would have been joint winner with McPhie and Simpson, as the trio could not be separated by the countback rule.
Brad Chapman	Fitzroy	1990	20	Suspended; would have won outright, beating Robertson and Watson by six votes.
Domenic Berry	Hawthorn	1990	15	Polled second-highest number of votes and would have won had he not been suspended.
