= Bill Gehling =

Australian rules footballer

Personal information
- Born: 12 April 1951 (age 75)
- Original team: Doncaster
- Height: 173 cm (5 ft 8 in)
- Weight: 76 kg (168 lb)
- Position: Rover

Playing career^{1}
Years	Club	Games (Goals)
1971	Richmond	1 (0)
- ^{1} Playing statistics correct to the end of 1971.

William Gehling (born Kevin Gehling; 12 April 1951) is a former Australian rules footballer who played with Richmond in the Victorian Football League (VFL).

== Playing career ==
Achievements include winning the Morrish Medal (U/19 VFL Best & Fairest) in 1969 and the Richmond U/19 Goal Kicking in 1968. A Premiership team member with the Richmond Under 19's in 1967, 1968, 1969, 1970 and Reserves premiership team 1971 and 1973. Continually overlooked for senior selection despite solid form over numerous years, Bill was conscripted to the armed forces National Service scheme, effectively ending any further VFL career. Bill then returned to Victorian metro football leagues, where he achieved both personal and team success. This was in the form of the Eastern Districts Football League League Best & Fairest in 1975 playing with home club Doncaster, before transferring and taking the field with Berwick in the South West Gippsland Football League, winning a league Best & Fairests in 1980 and club Best & Fairests in 1979. Premiership success with Berwick also came in 1979.
