= Damien Hardwick =

Australian rules football player and coach (born 1972)

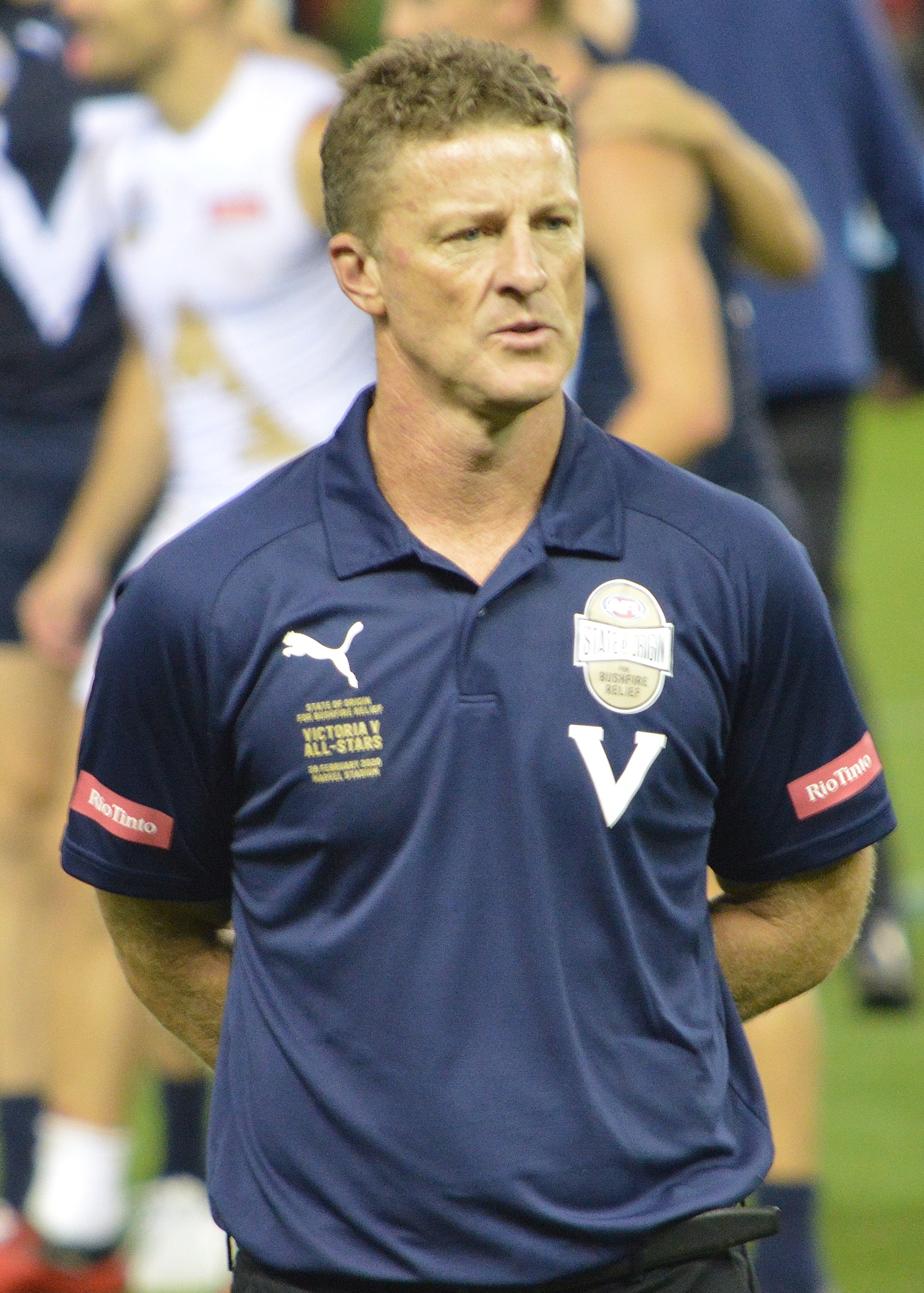
- Hardwick in February 2020

Personal information
- Full name: Damien Patrick Hardwick
- Nickname: Dimma
- Born: 18 August 1972 (age 54)
- Original team: North Melbourne U19's/Springvale F.C
- Draft: No. 87, 1992 national draft
- Height: 180 cm (5 ft 11 in)
- Weight: 82 kg (181 lb)
- Position: Wingman/Defender

Playing career^{1}
Years	Club	Games (Goals)
1994–2001	Essendon	153 (13)
2002–2004	Port Adelaide	54 (1)
Total		207 (14)

International team honours
Years	Team	Games (Goals)
2000–2001	Australia	4 (1)

Coaching career^{3}
Years	Club	Games (W–L–D)
2010–2023	Richmond	307 (170–131–6)
2024–	Gold Coast	71 (36–35–0)
2020	Representative; Victoria	1 (1–0–0)
Total		378 (206–166–6)
- ^{1} Playing statistics correct to the end of 2004.^{3} Coaching statistics correct as of the 2026 season.

Career highlights
- Playing: 2× AFL premiership player: 2000, 2004; 2x North Melbourne Under-19s premiership player: 1990, 1991; W. S. Crichton Medal: 1998; All-Australian team: 2000; 2x International rules series: 2000, 2001; Coaching: 3× AFL premiership coach: 2017, 2019, 2020; 3× Jock McHale Medal: 2017, 2019, 2020; 3× All-Australian Team: 2017, 2019, 2020; AFLCA Coach of the Year: 2017; Victoria representative honours in State of Origin for Bushfire Relief Match: 2020

Damien Patrick Hardwick (born 18 August 1972) is a current Australian rules football coach and former player who is the head coach of the Gold Coast Suns in the Australian Football League. He is the former senior coach of the Richmond Football Club, serving in the role between 2010 and mid-2023 inclusive and winning three premierships (2017, 2019, 2020).

Hardwick played 207 AFL games as a defender, comprising 153 games for Essendon (1993–2001) and 54 games for Port Adelaide (2002–2004). He won premierships with each club—in 2000 and 2004, respectively.

Hardwick was appointed head coach of Richmond at the end of the 2009 season, in which the club had placed second-last. In 2013, Hardwick's fourth season in charge, Richmond returned to the finals after an eleven-year absence, and in 2017 they defeated Adelaide in the Grand Final to claim their first premiership since 1980. Hardwick also coached Richmond to the 2019 and 2020 premierships and is the longest-tenured coach in the club's history.

== Early life ==
He attended St Joseph's College in Ferntree Gully. Hardwick was a key player in the school's football side, which was highly competitive against other private schools in the EIS sports program. In football, Hardwick was usually on the field for most of the game and known to be a tough, hard working, and versatile player who kept stability in play for his side. Although he was often outclassed by others on field, his all-round abilities were vital to the side.

He got his nickname Dimma due to his habit as a young man getting a deal at a local fish and chip shop where he could buy three dim sims for 60 cents.

== AFL playing career ==
=== Essendon ===
Beginning his AFL career with the Essendon Football Club in 1994, Hardwick was known as a tough, solid defender. His aggressive nature sometimes got him into trouble at the AFL Tribunal. He was a crucial member of Essendon's 2000 premiership side. Hardwick played for Essendon from 1994 until 2001 for a total of 153 games and 13 goals.

=== Port Adelaide ===
Hardwick was traded from Essendon to the Port Adelaide Football Club at the end of the 2001 season, and he played with the side from 2002 until his retirement at the end of the 2004 season for a total of 54 games and one goal. He was part of Port's premiership win in 2004. In the 2004 Grand Final, he won three free kicks at crucial times, including a reversal against Jason Akermanis which cost the Brisbane Lions a shot at goal.

== AFL coaching career ==
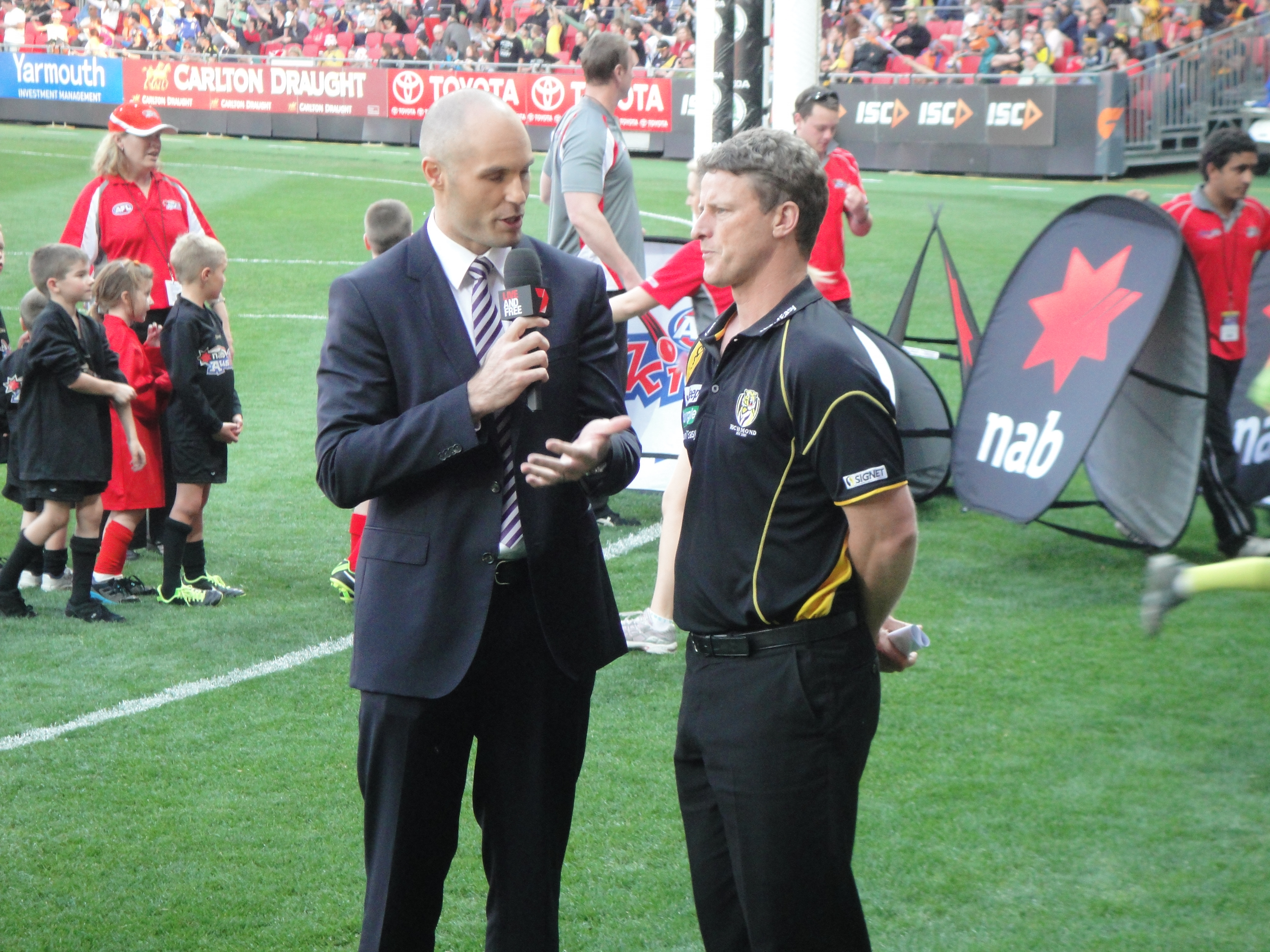
Hardwick being interviewed by Tom Harley in 2013

=== Hawthorn Football Club assistant coach (2005–2009) ===
In 2005, Hardwick began working as an assistant coach under senior coach Alastair Clarkson at Hawthorn. In 2007, he was shortlisted for the senior coaching job at Melbourne Football Club. However, he was unsuccessful, with the position going to Dean Bailey. Following this application, he was also shortlisted for the senior coaching job at Essendon Football Club to replace the outgoing Kevin Sheedy. However, he was overlooked in favour of former Richmond captain Matthew Knights.

=== Richmond Football Club senior coach (2010–2023) ===
On August 25, 2009, Hardwick received his first senior coaching job when he was appointed as the senior coach of Richmond Football Club for three years. Hardwick replaced Richmond Football Club caretaker senior coach Jade Rawlings, who replaced Terry Wallace, after Wallace resigned during the middle of the 2009 season, when the Tigers were struggling. In March 2012, Hardwick agreed to a two-year contract extension.

On 11 December 2013, club president, Peggy O'Neal, announced that Hardwick had accepted a two-year contract extension that tied him to the club at least until the end of the 2016 season. In 2016, Hardwick agreed to a two-year contract extension to the end of the 2018 season. In 2017, Hardwick coached Richmond to their first premiership since 1980 and their 11th overall with a 48-point victory over the Adelaide Crows. In 2019, Hardwick coached Richmond to another premiership and their 12th overall. Richmond beat GWS Giants by 89 points. In 2020, Hardwick coached Richmond to their third premiership in four years, and 13th overall. He also coached the Victoria State of Origin side in the one-off 2020 State of Origin match that was played on 28 February 2020 at Marvel Stadium.

Hardwick's first season at Richmond as senior coach in the 2010 season did not begin well, with nine straight losses to start the season as well as a few disciplinary problems arising at the club. However, in round 10, the Tigers had a breakthrough win, defeating Port Adelaide by 47 points in extremely wet conditions in Adelaide. They also set a new record for the most tackles ever made in an AFL match (142) since records began in 1987, and kept Port Adelaide to their lowest ever score. The club went on to win five more games making a total of six in Hardwick's first season. They finished the season in 15th position. Richmond under Hardwick over the next two seasons continue to show improvement, with eight wins and a draw in the 2011 season, bettering that with 10 wins and a draw in the 2012 season. In the 2013 season, Hardwick coached Richmond to its first finals series since 2001, and only its third since 1982. Carlton defeated Richmond by 20 points in the elimination final after the Tigers led by 26 points at half-time, eliminating Richmond from the finals series. In the 2014 season, Hardwick's team started the year very poorly, having a win–loss record of 3–10 at one stage. But remarkably, the Tigers went on to win their last nine matches of the home and away season to just make it into the finals. Richmond were, however, beaten convincingly by Port Adelaide by 57 points in the Elimination Final, finishing the season in eighth place.

Hardwick began the 2015 season under pressure to make amends for the past two failures in the Elimination Final. The team didn't start well, losing four out of the first six, before recovering to finish the season in fifth place with 15 wins, the same ladder position and win–loss record as 2013. Richmond came up against North Melbourne in the Elimination Final, but Hardwick's team suffered their third consecutive first week finals exit. The 2016 season was not a successful year for Hardwick as the Tigers finished the season with just eight wins from 22 games. The highlight was the round 8 win against the Sydney Swans when Sam Lloyd kicked a goal after the siren. They finished 13th on the premiership ladder, their worst ladder position in four seasons.

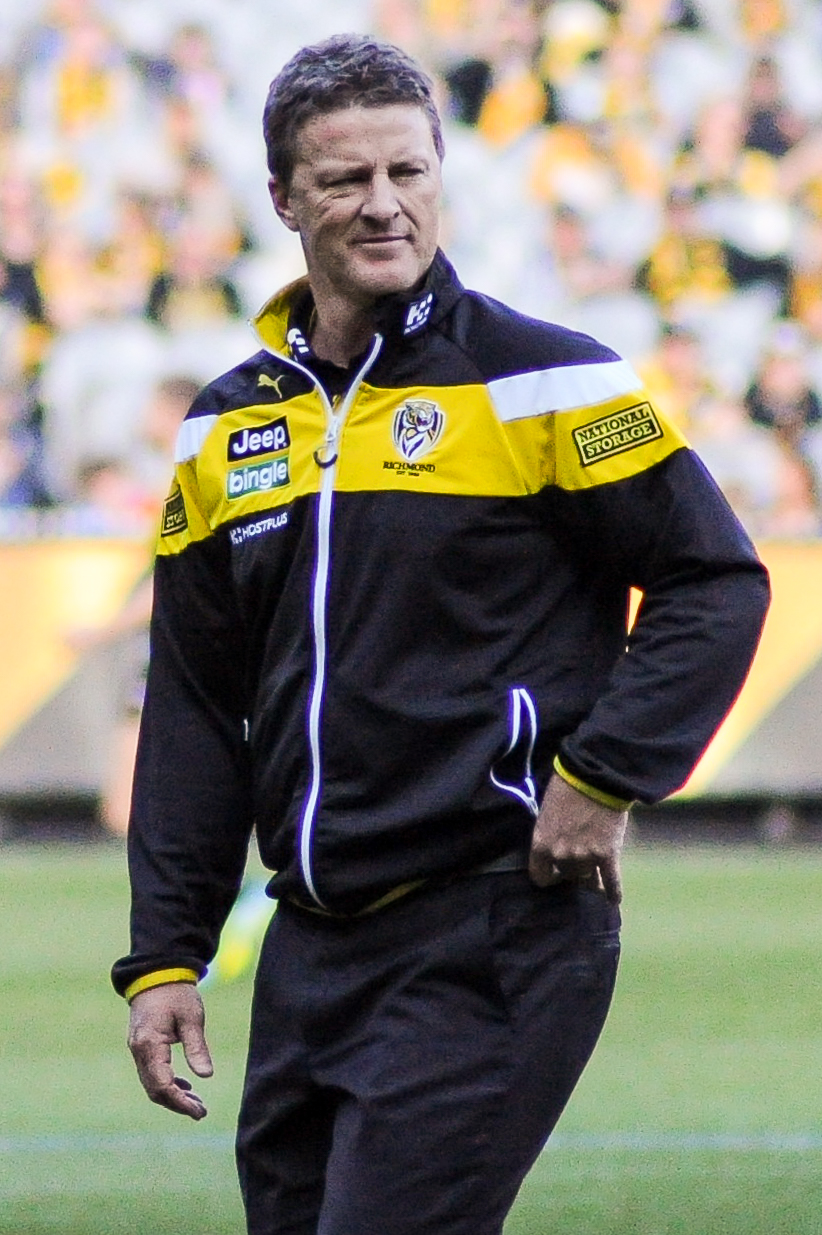
Hardwick in 2017

In the 2017 season, Hardwick coached Richmond to their eleventh VFL/AFL premiership, defeating the Adelaide Crows by 48 points. After becoming the first coach in 37 years to guide Richmond to a grand final win in the 2017 AFL Grand Final, Hardwick was chosen as the AFLCA Coach of the Year. He joined a very small group to win three AFL premierships with three clubs as player and coach, ending Richmond's 37-year drought in the process.

In the 2018 season, Hardwick followed his successful 2017 season by coaching Richmond to their first minor premiership since 1982 and to the finals. Richmond were, however, eliminated by eventual runners-up Collingwood by 39 points in the Preliminary Final.

In the 2019 season, Hardwick became a two-time premiership coach, guiding Richmond to their second premiership in three years and twelfth overall, with a resounding 89 point win over GWS Giants in the 2019 AFL Grand Final. It was the third-highest margin of victory in a grand final.

In the 2020 season, which was significantly affected by the COVID-19 pandemic in Australia, Hardwick coached Richmond to their third premiership in four years and became a three-time premiership coach. Richmond finished third on the ladder at the end of the home-and-away season (with a record of 12 wins, four losses, and a draw). They lost to the Brisbane Lions (10.9.69 to 8.6.54) in their qualifying final, defeated the St Kilda Saints (12.8.80 to 6.13.49) in their semi-final, and defeated Port Adelaide (6.10.46 to 6.4.40) in their preliminary final. They defeated the Geelong Cats by 31 points (12.9.81 to 7.8.50) in the grand final at The Gabba – the first grand final to be played outside Victoria and the first night-time grand final. Hardwick was heavily featured in the Prime Video web-series Making Their Mark which documented the 2020 AFL season.

Despite aiming to become the seventh team to win three consecutive premierships, the 2021 season was not a successful year for Hardwick, and the Tigers finished the season with just nine wins from 22 games. With a combination of many injured players and a lack of consistent form, Richmond finished 12th on the ladder, their worst ladder position since 2016, and failed to make finals for the first time in five years.

On 22 May 2023, after Round 10 in mid season, Hardwick unexpectedly announced his immediate resignation from his role as Richmond senior coach. The reason given was burnout and the stress involved as being a senior coach. Hardwick was replaced by assistant coach Andrew McQualter, who was named caretaker senior coach for the remainder of the 2023 season.

=== Gold Coast Suns senior coach (2024–present) ===
On 21 August 2023, Hardwick was announced as the senior coach of the Gold Coast Suns on a six-year contract, starting from the 2024 season. Hardwick replaced Gold Coast Suns caretaker senior coach Steven King, who replaced Stuart Dew after Dew was sacked in the middle of the 2023 season.

In the 2025 season, Hardwick guided the club in not only its first top-8 finish with 7th place but also earning the club's first final series berth in its 15-year history. They won their elimination final and progressed to a semi-final.

== Statistics ==
=== Playing statistics ===
Legend
G	Goals	K	Kicks	D	Disposals	T	Tackles
B	Behinds	H	Handballs	M	Marks
#	Played in that season's premiership team

Season	Team	No.	Games	Totals							Averages (per game)							Votes
Season	Team	No.	Games	G	B	K	H	D	M	T	G	B	K	H	D	M	T	Votes
1994	Essendon	39	17	6	4	176	107	283	62	29	0.4	0.2	10.4	6.3	16.6	3.6	1.7	3
1995	Essendon	39	16	2	1	123	97	220	38	31	0.1	0.1	7.7	6.1	13.8	2.4	1.9	0
1996	Essendon	39	17	1	1	170	102	272	60	22	0.1	0.1	10.0	6.0	16.0	3.5	1.3	0
1997	Essendon	39	15	3	2	177	87	264	55	26	0.2	0.1	11.8	5.8	17.6	3.7	1.7	3
1998	Essendon	11	23	0	1	325	117	442	87	43	0.0	0.0	14.1	5.1	19.2	3.8	1.9	9
1999	Essendon	11	20	0	0	246	108	354	51	32	0.0	0.0	12.3	5.4	17.7	2.6	1.6	0
2000^{#}	Essendon	11	24	0	1	270	172	442	71	55	0.0	0.0	11.3	7.2	18.4	3.0	2.3	0
2001	Essendon	11	21	1	0	203	155	358	72	41	0.0	0.0	9.7	7.4	17.0	3.4	2.0	0
2002	Port Adelaide	11	20	0	1	182	121	303	58	50	0.0	0.1	9.1	6.1	15.2	2.9	2.5	0
2003	Port Adelaide	11	20	0	2	154	111	265	57	42	0.0	0.1	7.7	5.6	13.3	2.9	2.1	0
2004^{#}	Port Adelaide	11	14	1	0	80	86	166	34	27	0.1	0.0	5.7	6.1	11.9	2.4	1.9	0
Career			207	14	13	2106	1263	3369	645	398	0.1	0.1	10.2	6.1	16.3	3.1	1.9	15

=== Coaching statistics ===
Statistics are correct to the end of Semi Final, 2025.

Team	Year	Home and Away Season					Finals			
Team	Year	Won	Lost	Drew	Win %	Position	Won	Lost	Win %	Result
RIC	2010	6	16	0	.273	15th out of 16	-	-	-	-
RIC	2011	8	13	1	.364	12th out of 17	-	-	-	-
RIC	2012	10	11	1	.456	12th out of 18	-	-	-	-
RIC	2013	15	7	0	.682	5th out of 18	0	1	.000	Lost to Carlton in Elimination Final
RIC	2014	12	10	0	.545	8th out of 18	0	1	.000	Lost to Port Adelaide in Elimination Final
RIC	2015	15	7	0	.682	5th out of 18	0	1	.000	Lost to North Melbourne in Elimination Final
RIC	2016	8	14	0	.364	13th out of 18	-	-	-	-
RIC	2017	15	7	0	.682	3rd out of 18	3	0	1.000	Defeated Adelaide in Grand Final
RIC	2018	18	4	0	.818	1st out of 18	1	1	.500	Lost to Collingwood in Preliminary Final
RIC	2019	16	6	0	.727	3rd out of 18	3	0	1.000	Defeated GWS in Grand Final
RIC	2020	12	4	1	.706	3rd out of 18	3	1	.750	Defeated Geelong in Grand Final
RIC	2021	9	12	1	.409	12th out of 18	-	-	-	-
RIC	2022	13	8	1	.591	7th out of 18	0	1	.000	Lost to Brisbane in Elimination Final
RIC	2023	3	6	1	.300	15th out of 18*	-	-	-	Resigned after round 10
RIC Total		170	131	6	.553		10	6	.625	
GC	2024	11	12	0	.478	13th out of 18	-	-	-	-
GC	2025	15	8	0	.652	7th out of 18	1	1	.500	Lost to Brisbane in Semi Final
GC	2026	9	14	0	.391	13th out of 18	-	-	-	-
GC Total		35	34	0	.507		1	1	.500	
Total		205	165	6	.545		11	7	.611	

*Ladder position after Hardwick's final match

== Honours and achievements ==
- North Melbourne Under-19s premiership player: 1990, 1991
- Essendon best and fairest 1998
- Essendon premiership player 2000
- All-Australian 2000
- International rules series: 2000, 2001
- Port Adelaide premiership player 2004
- Hawthorn premiership assistant coach 2008
- Richmond premiership coach: 2017, 2019, 2020
- Jock McHale Medal: 2017, 2019, 2020
- AFLCA Coach of the Year 2017
