= Making Their Mark =

2021 Australian sports documentary series

- Poster
- Genre: Documentary
- Directed by: Gil Marsden
- Starring: Eddie Betts; Stephen Coniglio; Nic Naitanui; Rory Sloane; Stuart Dew; Peggy O'Neal; Brendon Gale; Damien Hardwick
- Theme music composer: Bryony Marks
- No. of seasons: 1
- No. of episodes: 7

Production
- Executive producers: Cos Cardone, Luke Tunnecliffe, Gil Marsden, Michael Venables
- Producers: Josh Cable and others
- Production location: Australia
- Cinematography: Matt Koopmans
- Running time: 62–65 minutes
- Production companies: JAM TV, Den of Martians

Original release
- Release: 12 March 2021

Making Their Mark is a 2021 Australian sports documentary television series. It follows several players and staff from six different Australian rules football clubs that competed in the 2020 Australian Football League (AFL) season impacted by the COVID-19 pandemic.

== Synopsis ==
Not only does the series cover day-to-day aspects of a footballer's professional life, it also encompasses themes of leadership, grief, and racism, as it follows the lives of several players and staff from six different AFL clubs during the 2020 season. In that year, the clubs were greatly affected by the first wave of the COVID-19 pandemic as it hit Australia.

== Cast ==
The series stars Eddie Betts and Nic Naitanui, who were recorded almost continuously, representing the Carlton and West Coast Eagles football clubs respectively. Stephen Coniglio and Rory Sloane are also filmed extensively, as well as Gold Coast Suns football club coach Stuart Dew, and staff leaders Peggy O'Neal, Damien Hardwick and Brendon Gale of the Richmond Football Club.

Leon Cameron features in the series extensively, afterwards stating that he watched some of the uncomfortable moments of the show with the GWS Giants' captain, Coniglio, in private.

== Production ==
Making Their Mark was produced in Australia by JAM TV and Den of Martians, in association with the AFL.

The executive producers were Cos Cardone, Luke Tunnecliffe, Gil Marsden, and Michael Venables. It was directed by Marsden. Pete Williams was the story producer.

The seven one-hour episodes are composed of footage taken from 2500 hours of film, shot over seven months. Richmond's president, Peggy O'Neal, commented that it was a "wonderful opportunity" and that when filming was agreed to they had no idea that the COVID-19 pandemic would have such an impact.

The music was composed by accomplished screen composer Bryony Marks.

== Release ==
The series was released on 12 March 2021 on Amazon Prime Video.

== Reception ==
Critical reception of the series was generally favourable. Scott Hines stated it was worth streaming, even for an American audience.
