= Stuart Dew =

Australian rules footballer, born 1979

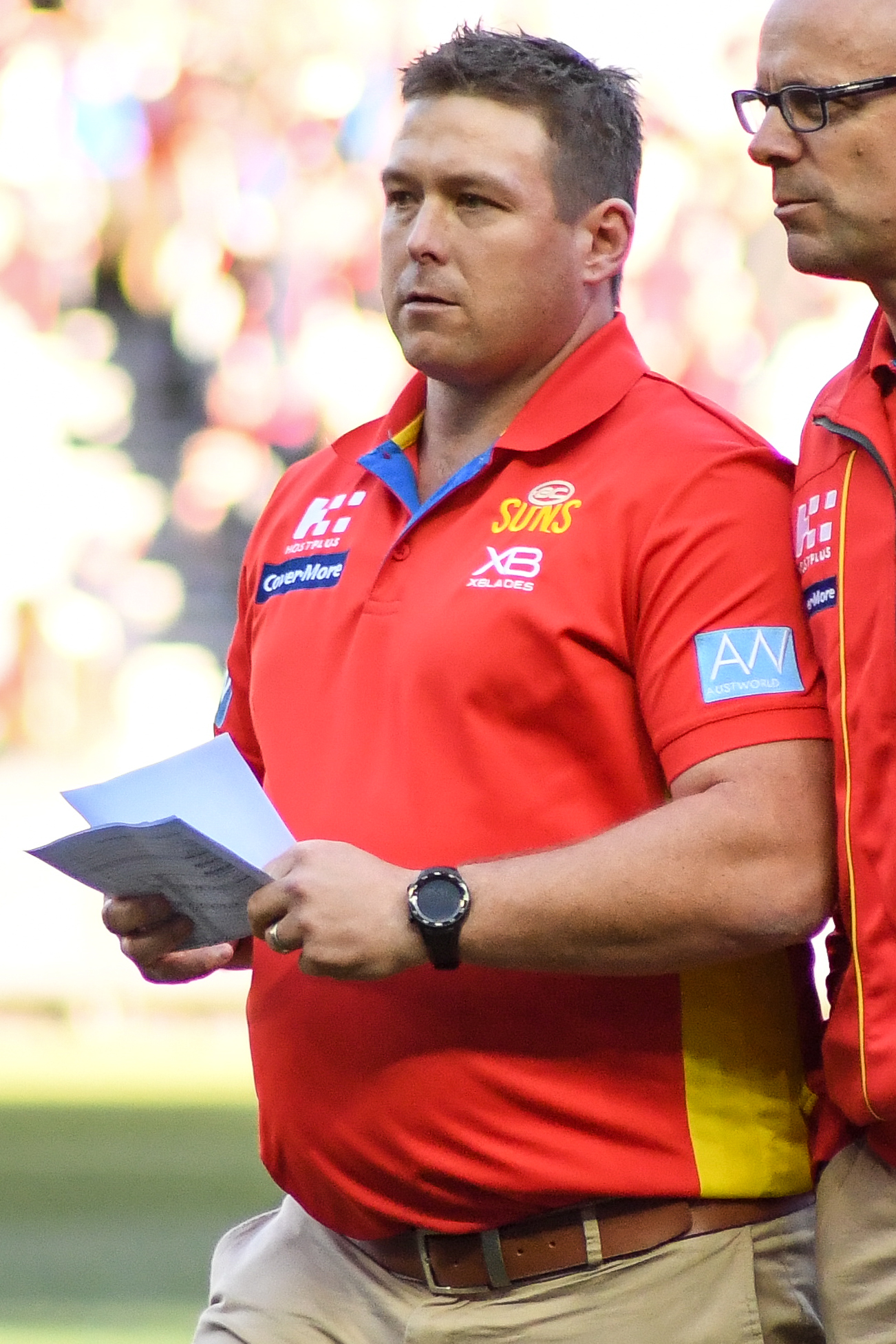
- Dew with Gold Coast in August 2018

Personal information
- Full name: Stuart Dew
- Born: 18 August 1979 (age 47); Adelaide, South Australia
- Original team: Central District (SANFL)
- Debut: Round 15, 1997, Port Adelaide vs. West Coast, at Subiaco Oval
- Height: 183 cm (6 ft 0 in)
- Position: Forward / Midfielder

Playing career^{1}
Years	Club	Games (Goals)
1997–2006	Port Adelaide	180 (245)
2008–2009	Hawthorn	26 (20)
Total		206 (265)

Coaching career^{3}
Years	Club	Games (W–L–D)
2018–2023	Gold Coast	121 (36–84–1)
- ^{1} Playing statistics correct to the end of 2009.^{3} Coaching statistics correct as of 2023.

Career highlights
- 2× AFL premiership player: 2004, 2008; Port Adelaide leading goalkicker: 2002; SANFL premiership player: 2000

Stuart Dew (born 18 August 1979) is an Australian rules football coach and former head coach of the Gold Coast Suns in the Australian Football League (AFL). He is currently an assistant coach at the Port Adelaide Football Club. As a player, he played for Port Adelaide and Hawthorn, winning premierships for both clubs in 2004 and 2008 respectively. Dew was acknowledged as being a long penetrating left foot kick of the football.

== Early life and junior football ==
Stuart Dew was born in Adelaide, South Australia on 18 August 1979. As a junior he played both cricket and Australian rules football with Salisbury Football Club on Salisbury Oval in the city's north. He played senior football with Central District Football Club in the South Australian National Football League before being pursued by new AFL club Port Adelaide to become the youngest player in its inaugural list.

== AFL career ==
=== Port Adelaide (1997–2006) ===
Dew made his debut with the Port Adelaide in 1997, their inaugural year in the AFL. But it was not until the 1998 season that he received regular selection. Dew became an important player for the Power as evidenced during the 2004 season when he kicked 31 goals and was a part of the club's premiership win. The 2005 season saw Dew play a running half-back role and played in all 24 games. On 6 November 2006, Dew announced his retirement from the AFL.

Dew played for Port Adelaide from 1997 until 2006 for a total of 180 games and 245 goals and was a member of Port Adelaide's 2004 premiership team.

=== Hawthorn (2008–2009) ===
Despite not playing football at any level during 2007, Dew announced his intentions to come out of retirement to play a final year with Central Districts. However, Alastair Clarkson, his former assistant coach at Port Adelaide and now senior coach at Hawthorn encouraged him to nominate for the 2007 AFL National Draft, where he was selected by Hawthorn with its third round selection (No. 45 overall). He debuted for Hawthorn against Melbourne in round 1, 2008, and injured his hamstring in his second match against Fremantle. He missed some games later in the year by injuring his hamstring again but was fit and playing well by the time of the finals. Stuart repaid the faith shown in him with a brilliant burst in the Grand Final when the result was still in the balance in the third quarter, kicking two goals and setting up two others. A series of soft tissues injuries restricted Dew to 11 games in 2009 and he announced his retirement from AFL at the end of the 2009 season.

Dew played for Hawthorn from 2008 until 2009 for a total of 26 games and 20 goals and was a member of Hawthorn's 2008 premiership team.

== Coaching career ==
=== Sydney Swans assistant coach (2010–2017) ===
After retiring as a player, Dew accepted a position with the Sydney Swans as an assistant coach in 2010 under senior coach Paul Roos and then under senior coach John Longmire from 2011. He was part of the Sydney Swans 2012 premiership coaching panel. He remained with Sydney Swans until 4 October 2017.

=== Gold Coast Suns senior coach (2018–2023) ===
Dew was announced as the senior coach of Gold Coast Suns on 4 October 2017. Dew replaced Gold Coast Suns caretaker senior coach Dean Solomon, who replaced Rodney Eade during the 2017 season with three games left to go after Eade stepped down, when told he would not receive a contract renewal as senior coach.

In Dew's first season as senior coach In the 2018 season, the Suns under Dew did not see improved results with on-field performance with a 17th finish on the ladder with four wins and 18 losses. In the 2019 season, the club's ladder position under Dew further deteriorated to finish in last place for the wooden spoon with three wins and 19 losses. In the 2020 season, the Suns under Dew improved to finish in 14th place on the ladder with five wins, one draw and 11 losses. The 2021 season saw the Suns under Dew finish 16th on the ladder. In the 2022 season, the Suns under Dew finished 12th on the ladder with 10 wins and 12 losses, but did not make the finals. In the 2023 season, The Suns under Dew still showed no improved on-field performance sitting at 13th on the ladder with seven wins and nine losses after Round 17, 2023.

On 11 July 2023, Dew was sacked as senior coach of Gold Coast Suns, following a 33 point loss to second-placed Port Adelaide in Round 17, 2023. Dew was replaced by assistant coach Steven King as caretaker senior coach for the remainder of the 2023 season.

Dew coached the Gold Coast Suns for just under 6 seasons to a total of 121 games with 36 wins, one draw and 84 losses to a winning percentage of 30 percent.

=== Brisbane Lions (2024–2025) ===
In mid-2024 Dew was appointed as a part-time skills coach for the Brisbane Lions following their difficult start to the 2024 AFL season. He was a member of the coaching staff during their premiership victory at the 2024 AFL Grand Final. He then signed on full-time as an assistant coach at the Brisbane Lions where he was a member of the coaching staff during their premiership victory at the 2025 AFL Grand Final.

=== Port Adelaide (2026–present) ===
In late 2025 Dew left the Brisbane Lions and returned to the club he won his inaugural premiership as a player, Port Adelaide, to assume the position of senior assistant coach with responsibility for managing the club's midfield players under senior coach Josh Carr.

== In the media ==
Dew features in the 2021 fly-on-the-wall documentary TV series Making Their Mark, which showed the impact of the COVID-19 pandemic on several AFL clubs, players, and staff. Players Nic Naitanui, Eddie Betts, Stephen Coniglio, and Rory Sloane, were filmed intensively, while Dew and staff leaders Peggy O'Neal, Damien Hardwick, and Brendon Gale also featured.

== Statistics ==
=== Playing statistics ===
Legend
G	Goals	K	Kicks	D	Disposals	T	Tackles
B	Behinds	H	Handballs	M	Marks

Season	Team	No.	Games	Totals							Averages (per game)							Votes
Season	Team	No.	Games	G	B	K	H	D	M	T	G	B	K	H	D	M	T	Votes
1997	Port Adelaide	37	1	0	0	2	1	3	0	0	0.0	0.0	2.0	1.0	3.0	0.0	0.0	0
1998	Port Adelaide	37	15	12	5	148	54	202	48	23	0.8	0.3	9.9	3.6	13.5	3.2	1.5	0
1999	Port Adelaide	37	23	27	35	181	60	241	47	19	1.2	1.5	7.9	2.6	10.5	2.0	0.8	0
2000	Port Adelaide	17	13	20	9	123	41	164	37	12	1.5	0.7	9.5	3.2	12.6	2.8	0.9	3
2001	Port Adelaide	17	24	44	19	231	89	320	61	24	1.8	0.8	9.6	3.7	13.3	2.5	1.0	8
2002	Port Adelaide	17	23	51	24	199	75	274	49	43	2.2	1.0	8.7	3.3	11.9	2.1	1.9	5
2003	Port Adelaide	17	15	23	17	123	32	155	33	30	1.5	1.1	8.2	2.1	10.3	2.2	2.0	0
2004^{#}	Port Adelaide	17	22	31	21	149	79	228	49	32	1.4	1.0	6.8	3.6	10.4	2.2	1.5	0
2005	Port Adelaide	17	24	19	14	291	138	429	91	58	0.8	0.6	12.1	5.8	17.9	3.8	2.4	6
2006	Port Adelaide	17	20	18	17	192	90	282	71	46	0.9	0.9	9.6	4.5	14.1	3.6	2.3	1
2008^{#}	Hawthorn	31	15	7	4	140	109	249	71	40	0.5	0.3	9.3	7.3	16.6	4.7	2.7	1
2009	Hawthorn	31	11	13	4	101	59	160	31	30	1.2	0.4	9.2	5.4	14.5	2.8	2.7	0
Career			206	265	169	1880	827	2707	588	357	1.3	0.8	9.1	4.0	13.1	2.9	1.7	24

=== Coaching statistics ===
Statistics are correct to the end of 2023

Legend
W	Wins	L	Losses	D	Draws	W%	Winning percentage	LP	Ladder position	LT	League teams

Season	Team	Games	W	L	D	W %	LP	LT
2018	Gold Coast	22	4	18	0	18.2%	17	18
2019	Gold Coast	22	3	19	0	13.6%	18	18
2020	Gold Coast	17	5	11	1	29.4%	14	18
2021	Gold Coast	22	7	15	0	31.8%	16	18
2022	Gold Coast	22	10	12	0	45.5%	12	18
2023	Gold Coast	16	7	9	0	43.8%	—	18
Career totals		121	36	84	1	29.8%		

== Honours and achievements ==
Team

- AFL premiership player (Port Adelaide): 2004
- AFL premiership player (Hawthorn): 2008
- 3× Minor premiership (Port Adelaide): 2002, 2003, 2004
- SANFL premiership player (Central District): 2000

Individual

- Port Adelaide leading goalkicker: 2002
- AFL Rising Star nominee: 1998

== Personal life ==
Dew is married to former Seven News presenter Sarah Cumming and they have two children.
