= Jason Snell (footballer) =

Australian rules footballer

Personal information
- Full name: Jason Snell
- Born: 27 July 1977 (age 49)
- Original team: Eastern Ranges
- Draft: 34th, 1995 AFL draft
- Height: 180 cm (5 ft 11 in)
- Weight: 83 kg (183 lb)

Playing career^{1}
Years	Club	Games (Goals)
1996–2001	Geelong	68 (62)
- ^{1} Playing statistics correct to the end of 2001.

Jason Snell (born 27 July 1977) is a former Australian rules footballer who played with Geelong in the Australian Football League (AFL).

When Snell arrived at Geelong from the Eastern Ranges, it was as a midfielder but he played the majority of his football as a forward. The 34th pick of the 1995 AFL draft, he kicked five goals in a quarter against Port Adelaide in 1997 and put together 16 games in 1998. He played all but one game in 1999 and the following season averaged 15.60 disposals.

After starting the 2001 AFL season, with a 22 disposal and two goal effort in a win over the West Coast Eagles, Snell's career came to an end two rounds later when he severely injured his leg. His injury, sustained against Melbourne at the MCG, was so serious that the bone pierced the skin, he got up and screamed for the trainer. Snell had to have his left ankle fused and announced his retirement in 2002 after being told he would never be able to run again.
