= Eastern Ranges =

Names
- Full name: Eastern Ranges Football Club
- Nickname: Ranges

2026 season
- After finals: 4th
- Home-and-away season: 8th

Club details
- Founded: 1992; 34 years ago
- Colours: Blue; Yellow; White; Red
- Competition: Talent League
- Premierships: Talent League (3) 2002, 2013, 2025
- Ground: Box Hill City Oval

Other information
- Official website: easternranges.aflvic.com.au

The Eastern Ranges is an Australian rules football team that currently competes in the Talent League, the Victorian statewide under-19s competition.

== History ==
=== Inaugural playing squad (1992) ===
Eastern Ranges 1992 playing squad
Primary list			Coaching staff
1 Mark Attard; 2 Andrew Eslick; 3 Mark Brebner; 4 Dean Grace; 5 Aaron Rochie; 6 Heath Goodale; 7 Brett Chandler; 8 Travis Keoug; 9 Darrin Albert; 10 Paul Mullarvey; 11 Travis Mulder; 12 Adam McConnell; 13 Brad Nicholson; 14 Bruce Cohen	15 Jason Disney; 16 Brendan Jackson; 17 Lee Corcoran; 18 Steven Harvey; 19 Danny Pearce; 20 Colin Phillips; 21 Brett Greig; 22 Brett Hartin; 23 Bevan Smillie; 24 Rayden Tallis; 25 Adam Kingsley; 26 Damien Franken; 27 Justin Carusi; 28 Marcus McDonald; 29 Jeremy McVay; 30 Jason Daniltchenko; 31 Karson Stimson	32 Tim Bickerton; 33 Glenn Wallace; 34 Matthew Allen; 35 Daniel Hargraves; 36 Darren Sharp; 37 Ben Aulich; 38 Steven Welsh; 39 Cameron James; 40 Michael Scoon; 46 Trent Jacobs; 47 Dean Talbot; 48 Paul van Hoorn	Legend: (c) Captain(s); (vc) Vice-captain(s); italics - Inactive player list; Long-term injury; (ret.) Retired; Updated: Source(s):

== Honours ==
- Premiers (3): 2002, 2013, 2025
- Runners-up (6): 1995, 2000, 2004, 2015, 2019, 2023
- Minor Premiers (3): 1995, 2002, 2019
- Wooden Spoons (1): 2012
- Morrish Medallists: Matthew Bate (2004), Ben Cavarra (2013)
- TAC Cup Coach Award Winners: Jason Snell (1995), Tim Finocchairo (1996), Blake Grima (2002), Rory Sloane (2008)
- Grand Final Best-on-Ground Medalists: Stephen Dinnell (2002), Ben Cavarra (2013) Xavier Taylor (2025)

== Draftees ==
- 1992: Mark Attard, Jeremy McVay, Jason Disney
- 1993: Brad Nicholson, Chris Scott, Rayden Tallis, Paul Mullarvey, Daniel Hargreaves
- 1994: Brett Chandler, Mark Cullen, Damien Ryan, Brad Scott, Adam White, Emil Parthenides, Matthew Banks
- 1995: Clinton King, Kane Johnson, Nick Trask, Jason Snell, Kane Fraser
- 1996: David Wirrpanda, Jess Sinclair, Adam Kingsley
- 1997: Andrew Pugsley, Mark Bolton, Jason Saddington, Brett Rose, Tim Finocchiaro, Fred Campbell
- 1998: Troy Simmonds
- 1999: Damien Cupido, Scott Homewood, Michael Clark, Lindsay Gilbee, Simon Godfrey, Marc Skidmore
- 2000: none
- 2001: Richard Cole, Kieran McGuiness
- 2002: Blake Grima, Brad Fisher, Cameron Cloke, Greg Edgcombe, Joel Perry, Kade Simpson, Kris Shore, Nick Malceski
- 2003: Daniel McConnell
- 2004: Matthew Bate, Fabian Deluca, Travis Cloke, Chris Knights
- 2005: Matthew Spangher
- 2006: Leigh Adams
- 2007: Matthew Lobbe
- 2008: Sam Blease, Liam Shiels, Rory Sloane, Nathan O'Keefe
- 2009: Andrew Moore, Jordan Gysberts, Ben Griffiths, Ayden Kennedy
- 2010: Kieran Harper, Aaron Young, Cam O'Shea, Paul Seedsman
- 2011: Jonathon Patton, Hayden Crozier, Aaron Mullett
- 2012: none
- 2013: Thomas Boyd, Michael Apeness, Daniel McStay, Mitch Honeychurch
- 2014: Christian Petracca, Daniel Nielson
- 2015: Blake Hardwick, Ryan Clarke, Sam Weideman
- 2016: Jordan Gallucci, Josh Begley, Callum Brown, Jack Maibaum, Dylan Clarke, Nathan Mullenger-McHugh, Tristan Tweedie
- 2017: Adam Cerra, Jaidyn Stephenson, Sam Hayes, Tyler Brown, Ryley Stoddart, Joel Garner, Tom North, Dylan Moore, Jackson Ross, Trent Mynott
- 2018: none
- 2019: none
- 2020: Connor Downie
- 2021: Tyler Sonsie, Jake Soligo, Flynn Kroeger
- 2022: Lewis Hayes
- 2023: Nick Watson, Caleb Windsor
- 2024: Iliro Smit, Josh Smillie, Christian Moraes, Cody Anderson
- 2025: Sullivan Robey, Xavier Taylor, Oskar Taylor, Lachy Dovaston, Oliver Greeves
