= Talent League =

Under-18 Australian rules football competition

- Formerly: Victorian State Football League U18s (1992–96); TAC Cup (1997–2018); NAB League (2019–2022)
- Sport: Australian rules football
- First season: 1992
- No. of teams: 18
- Country: Australia
- Region: Victoria; Tasmania; New South Wales; Queensland; Northern Territory
- Most recent champion: Gippsland Power (2)
- Most titles: Calder Cannons & Sandringham Dragons (6)
- Website: afl.com.au/talent-league

The Talent League is an under-18s and under-16s Australian rules football representative competition based in Melbourne and run by the Australian Football League (AFL). It is based on geographic regions throughout country Victoria and metropolitan Melbourne with each team representing one of twelve Victorian regions.

The competition is the primary sources of recruitment for the clubs of the AFL with around three quarters of all players selected from its ranks in each AFL draft. It provides an opportunity for talented young regional players to participate in a high standard competition without having to relocate too far from their place of origin. The competition has a very successful pathway with players missing AFL selection often being recruited by semi-professional state, country and regional leagues throughout Australia. An equivalent competition for female footballers, known as the Talent League Girls, is also contested on an annual basis.

The league has been known by various sponsored names since its inception in 1992 as the Victorian State Football League Under-18s (VSFL U18) in 1992. While the Transport Accident Commission's sponsorship commenced in the same year, the competition was not known as the TAC Cup until 1997. This sponsorship lasted two decades until the competition was renamed the NAB League (after the National Australia Bank) in 2019. Ahead of the 2023 season, the AFL returned a 'sponsorless' name to the competition with its new branding as the Talent League; albeit this was accompanied by naming rights from Coates Hire for seasons 2023 to 2025 inclusive, where it was known as the Coates Talent League. As of 14 January 2026, the league has no naming rights sponsor.

== History ==
With the focus of the VFL/AFL moving rapidly toward a national competition, the former metropolitan and country zoning recruitment system for the Victorian VFL/AFL clubs was abolished, and the league's under-19 competition was shut down at the end of 1991.

A new competition, administered by the Victorian State Football League and sponsored by the Transport Accident Commission, was formed as an avenue for young Victorian under-18 players to make the transition to becoming senior League players. It commenced play on 10 April 1992, the competition consisted of five metropolitan teams and one country team: the Northern Knights, Eastern Ranges, Southern Stingrays (renamed the Dandenong Stingrays in 1995), Western Jets, Central Dragons (renamed the Prahran Dragons in 1995, then the Sandringham Dragons in 2000) and Geelong Falcons.

In 1993 an additional four country teams were included – the Murray Bushrangers, Bendigo Pioneers, Gippsland Power and Ballarat Rebels (renamed the North Ballarat Rebels in 1996, then the Greater Western Victoria Rebels in 2017). In 1995 two additional metropolitan regions were established, with the Oakleigh Chargers and Calder Cannons teams included in the competition.

In 1995, a Tasmanian-based team, the Tassie Mariners, commenced in the competition, becoming the league's first non-Victorian side. The following year, the NSW/ACT Rams were admitted. The Mariners and Rams both exited the competition as full-time members at the end of the 2002, returning the competition to twelve teams.

The Gold Coast Football Club recruited several under-18s players in the 2008/09 summer, and participated in the TAC Cup in 2009 (before playing in the VFL in 2010 and the AFL from 2011). Similarly, the Greater Western Sydney Giants fielded a TAC Cup team in 2010, two seasons prior to its introduction to the AFL in 2012.

Four interstate teams — the Tassie Mariners, NSW/ACT Rams, Queensland Scorpions and the Northern Territory Thunder — each play a handful of games each year against TAC Cup teams, particularly in the lead-up to the annual AFL Under 18 Championships; these games are counted as part of the TAC Cup premiership season, but the interstate clubs are not eligible for the premiership.

Between 1995 and 2008, the finals system was in a knock-out format. This reverted to a traditional finals system in 2009 with the introduction of the Gold Coast team. In 2010, this was extended to include 12 of the 13 clubs participating that season, with the extra matches forming an extended knockout format. In 2011 the finals system was reverted to the traditional eight-team AFL finals series. Prior to the 2014 season, the NSW/ACT Rams was reestablished as a TAC Cup team, with players from the Sydney Swans and Greater Western Sydney Giants young academy sides being picked for the NSW/ACT team.

From 2019, the newly named NAB League introduced six new teams: the AFL Academy sides of Gold Coast, GWS Giants, Sydney Swans, Brisbane Lions; the Northern Territory; and the returning Tassie Mariners, who were later renamed the Tasmania Devils. Additionally, teams were able to include more 19-year-olds – previously only three could be selected. The 2020 season was cancelled due to the COVID-19 pandemic, and in 2021 the competition fully transitioned from under-18s to under-19s – although the draft age to senior football remained at 18. Since 2023 the league has been primarily by under-18 players, with a selection of under-19 players also listed.

== Age eligibility ==
For many years the league was primarily a competition for 18-year-olds, though exceptions were made for bottom-aged players—16- or 17-year-olds—and since 2007, over-age players—19-year-olds—to participate in the competition. In 2021 the league shifted to an under-19 level, though the entry age for the AFL draft remains 18.

Since the beginning of the 2007 TAC Cup season, clubs have been granted permission to select up to five over-age players permitted on their lists.

Nonetheless, age eligibility requirements remain for the AFL draft, where players must have turned eighteen years of age by 31 December of that draft year to be eligible for selection by an AFL club.

== Awards ==
=== Morrish Medal ===
The Morrish Medal is awarded to the best player in the competition each year. The same medal was previously awarded to the best player in the Victorian Football League Thirds/Under-19s competition, which the TAC Cup superseded.

=== TAC Cup Coaches Award ===
The TAC Cup Coaches Award is voted on by both coaches in a 5–4–3–2–1 format at the end of each game. At the end of the 2015 season, the award was discontinued.

Year	Player/s	Team
2015	Jade Gresham	Northern Knights
2014	Oscar McDonald	North Ballarat Rebels
2013	Louis Herbert	North Ballarat Rebels
2012	Jake Lloyd	North Ballarat Rebels
2011	Shaun Marusic	Gippsland Power
2010	Adam Marcon	Northern Knights
2009	Anton Woods	Northern Knights
2008	Rory Sloane	Eastern Ranges
2007	Matthew Kreuzer	Northern Knights
2006	Andrew Horne	Calder Cannons
2005	Richard Douglas	Calder Cannons
2004	Adam Pattison	Northern Knights
2003	Colin Sylvia	Bendigo Pioneers
2002	Blake Grima	Eastern Ranges
2001	Brad Miller; Russell Grigg	Western Jets; Bendigo Pioneers
2000	Paul Carson	Western Jets
1999	Leigh Brown	Gippsland Power
1998	Stephen Hazleman	Gippsland Power
1997	Matthew Bernes	Tassie Mariners
1996	Tim Finocchiaro	Eastern Ranges
1995	Jason Snell	Eastern Ranges
1994	Jason McFarlane	Gippsland Power
1993	Angelo Lekkas	Northern Knights
1992	Brad Smith	Northern Knights

== Coverage ==
All matches are live streamed on the AFL app.

Former coverage included:

- The Match of the Round being broadcast live on Rumble 103, an internet radio station based in Melbourne.
- A TAC Cup show screening on Channel 9 in Melbourne and across Victoria and Inland NSW border regions on WIN TV from 1 p.m. every Sunday from late March until the end of September.
- TAC Cup news and results being seen on C31's Local Footy Show and heard on the ABC's Triple J radio station.
- TAC Cup matches were broadcast live on C31 in Melbourne, Geelong & regional Victoria in 2010.
- Radio stations SYN FM & RRR FM broadcast coverage of TAC Cup football matches every weekend during the season.

== Clubs ==
=== Current clubs ===
Club	Colours	State	Home venue	Est.	Seasons		Premierships	
Club	Colours	State	Home venue	Est.	First	Total	Total	Recent
Bachar Houli Foundation Academy		VIC	Punt Road Oval	2012	2026	1	Not eligible	
Bendigo Pioneers		VIC	Queen Elizabeth Oval	1993	1993	32	0	−
Brisbane Lions (A)		QLD	Brighton Homes Arena	2010	2019	6	Not eligible	
Calder Cannons		VIC	Highgate Recreation Reserve	1995	1995	30	6	2010
Dandenong Stingrays *		VIC	Shepley Oval	1992	1992	33	1	2018
Eastern Ranges		VIC	Kilsyth Recreation Reserve	1992	1992	33	3	2025
Geelong Falcons		VIC	Chirnside Park	1992	1992	33	3	2017
Gippsland Power		VIC	Morwell Recreation Reserve	1993	1993	32	2	2026
Gold Coast Suns (A)		QLD	Carrara Stadium	2010	2019	6	Not eligible	
Greater Western Sydney Giants (A)		NSW	Sydney Showground Stadium	2010	2019	6	Not eligible	
Greater Western Victoria Rebels *		VIC	Eureka Stadium	1993	1993	32	1	1997
Murray Bushrangers		VIC	Norm Minns Oval, Wangaratta	1993	1993	32	2	2008
Northern Knights *		VIC	Preston City Oval	1992	1992	33	4	1996
Northern Territory (A)		NT	Marrara Oval	1979	2000	22	Not eligible	
Oakleigh Chargers		VIC	Warrawee Park	1995	1995	30	5	2019
Sandringham Dragons *		VIC	Trevor Barker Beach Oval	1992	1992	33	6	2024
Sydney Swans (A)		NSW	Sydney Cricket Ground	2010	2019	6	Not eligible	
Tasmania Devils		TAS	Bellerive Oval; York Park	2019	2019	6	0	−
Western Jets		VIC	Williamstown Cricket Ground	1992	1992	33	0	−

- (A) Denotes that the club is the academy team of a senior club of the Australian Football League
- Dandenong Stingrays were Southern Stingrays from 1992-1995
- Greater Western Victoria Rebels were Ballarat 1992-1995, then North Ballarat 1996-2016
- Northern Knights were Preston Knight from 1996-1999
- Sandringham Dragons were Central Dragons 1992-1995, then Prahran Dragons 1996-1999

=== Former clubs ===
Club	Colours	State & Territory	Home venue	Est.	Seasons		Premierships
Club	Colours	State & Territory	Home venue	Est.	Years	Total	Premierships
Gold Coast Suns (S)		QLD	Carrara Stadium	2009	2009−2009	1	0
Greater Western Sydney (S)		NSW	Sydney Showground Stadium	2010	2010−2010	1	0
NSW/ACT Rams		NSW & ACT	Various	1996	1996−2009; 2011−2011; 2013−2016	14	0
Queensland Scorpions		QLD	The Gabba	1953	2000−2008; 2010−2016	16	Not eligible
Tassie Mariners		TAS	Bellerive Oval, York Park	1976	1995−2016	22	0

- (S) − Senior side of a club that later joined the AFL

=== VFL affiliations ===
Eight of the 12 Victorian-based Talent League clubs are affiliated with a Victorian Football League (VFL) club. This allows for a development pathway between under-18s football and state-level senior football, with top-age players permitted to play senior VFL games under the 23rd man rule:

- Calder Cannons - Coburg
- Dandenong Stingrays - Frankston
- Eastern Ranges - Box Hill
- Geelong Falcons - Werribee
- Gippsland Power - Casey Demons
- Oakleigh Chargers - Port Melbourne
- Sandringham Dragons - Sandringham
- Western Jets - Williamstown

== Premiers ==
Season	Premiers	GF Score	Runner-up	Venue	Best-on-ground
1992	Geelong Falcons	18.16 (124) – 12.10 (82)	Western Jets	Melbourne Cricket Ground	Daniel Fletcher
1993	Northern Knights	32.10 (202) – 18.11 (119)	Western Jets	Melbourne Cricket Ground	Shannon Gibson
1994	Northern Knights	16.21 (117) – 15.17 (107)	Geelong Falcons	Melbourne Cricket Ground	Anthony Rocca
1995	Northern Knights	12.20 (92) – 7.21 (63)	Eastern Ranges	Melbourne Cricket Ground	Brent Harvey
1996	Northern Knights	15.15 (105) – 14.6 (90)	NSW/ACT Rams	Melbourne Cricket Ground	Matthew Harrison
1997	North Ballarat Rebels	16.15 (111) – 10.16 (76)	Dandenong Stingrays	Melbourne Cricket Ground	Adam Goodes
1998	Murray Bushrangers	17.18 (120) – 12.12 (84)	Geelong Falcons	Melbourne Cricket Ground	Michael Stevens
1999	Sandringham Dragons	16.8 (104) – 8.6 (54)	Gippsland Power	Melbourne Cricket Ground	Dylan Smith
2000	Geelong Falcons	18.16 (124) – 15.12 (102)	Eastern Ranges	Melbourne Cricket Ground	Amon Buchanan
2001	Calder Cannons	16.14 (110) – 10.13 (73)	Bendigo Pioneers	Melbourne Cricket Ground	Jordan Barham
2002	Eastern Ranges	10.5 (65) – 9.10 (64)	Calder Cannons	Melbourne Cricket Ground	Stephen Dinnell
2003	Calder Cannons	16.14 (110) – 2.6 (18)	Murray Bushrangers	Melbourne Cricket Ground	Brock McLean
2004	Calder Cannons	19.20 (134) – 9.10 (64)	Eastern Ranges	Melbourne Cricket Ground	Jesse D. Smith
2005	Gippsland Power	12.9 (81) – 10.6 (66)	Dandenong Stingrays	Melbourne Cricket Ground	Dale Thomas
2006	Oakleigh Chargers	19.16 (130) – 16.7 (103)	Calder Cannons	Melbourne Cricket Ground	Dean Kelly
2007	Calder Cannons	14.20 (104) – 7.12 (54)	Murray Bushrangers	Melbourne Cricket Ground	Ashley Arrowsmith
2008	Murray Bushrangers	21.16 (142) – 9.7 (61)	Dandenong Stingrays	Docklands Stadium/Telstra Dome	Steele Sidebottom
2009	Calder Cannons	17.10 (112) – 14.14 (98)	Dandenong Stingrays	Docklands Stadium/Etihad Stadium	Jake Melksham
2010	Calder Cannons	17.14 (116) – 8.10 (58)	Gippsland Power	Docklands Stadium/Etihad Stadium	Mitch Wallis
2011	Sandringham Dragons	17.11 (113) – 16.9 (105)	Oakleigh Chargers	Docklands Stadium/Etihad Stadium	Jack Viney
2012	Oakleigh Chargers	12.10 (82) – 12.9 (81)	Gippsland Power	Docklands Stadium/Etihad Stadium	Jackson Macrae
2013	Eastern Ranges	24.8 (152) – 5.10 (40)	Dandenong Stingrays	Docklands Stadium/Etihad Stadium	Ben Cavarra
2014	Oakleigh Chargers	17.15 (117) – 11.4 (70)	Calder Cannons	Docklands Stadium/Etihad Stadium	Toby McLean
2015	Oakleigh Chargers	10.13 (73) – 9.7 (61)	Eastern Ranges	Docklands Stadium/Etihad Stadium	Kade Answerth
2016	Sandringham Dragons	12.13 (85) – 9.14 (68)	Murray Bushrangers	Docklands Stadium/Etihad Stadium	Andrew McGrath
2017	Geelong Falcons	13.11 (89) – 13.9 (87)	Sandringham Dragons	Docklands Stadium/Etihad Stadium	Gryan Miers
2018	Dandenong Stingrays	12.8 (80) - 11.8 (74)	Oakleigh Chargers	Princes Park/Ikon Park	Matthew Rowell
2019	Oakleigh Chargers	12.17 (89) - 5.6 (36)	Eastern Ranges	Princes Park/Ikon Park	Matthew Rowell
2020	No premiership awarded due to the COVID-19 pandemic				
2021	No premiership awarded due to the COVID-19 pandemic				
2022	Sandringham Dragons	14.10 (94) – 7.9 (51)	Dandenong Stingrays	Princes Park/Ikon Park	Will Ashcroft
2023	Sandringham Dragons	17.10 (112) - 10.9 (69)	Eastern Ranges	Princes Park/Ikon Park	Will Brown
2024	Sandringham Dragons	16.7 (103) - 10.6 (66)	Greater Western Victoria Rebels	Princes Park/Ikon Park	Sam Marshall
2025	Eastern Ranges	13.5 (83) - 10.8 (68)	Sandringham Dragons	Princes Park/Ikon Park	Xavier Taylor
2026	Gippsland Power	16.10 (106) - 10.11 (71)	Dandenong Stingrays	Whitten Oval	Cody Templeton

=== Total premierships by club ===
- 6 – Calder Cannons, Sandringham Dragons
- 5 – Oakleigh Chargers
- 4 – Northern Knights
- 3 – Geelong Falcons, Eastern Ranges
- 2 – Murray Bushrangers, Gippsland Power
- 1 – Dandenong Stingrays, Greater Western Victoria Rebels
- 0 – Bendigo Pioneers, Western Jets

NSW/ACT Rams, as of 2015, do not play a full season, and therefore cannot compete for the premiership.

=== Total runner-up placements by club ===
- 7 – Dandenong Stingrays
- 6 – Eastern Ranges
- 5 -
- 4 -
- 3 – Murray Bushrangers, Calder Cannons, Gippsland Power
- 2 – Oakleigh Chargers, Geelong Falcons, Western Jets, Sandringham Dragons
- 1 – Greater Western Victoria Rebels, Bendigo Pioneers, NSW/ACT Rams
- 0 – Northern Knights

== Talent League Girls ==
A female youth competition, the Talent League Girls, equivalent to the Talent League, was inaugurated in 2017.
