= Newport, Victoria =

Newport
- Suburb
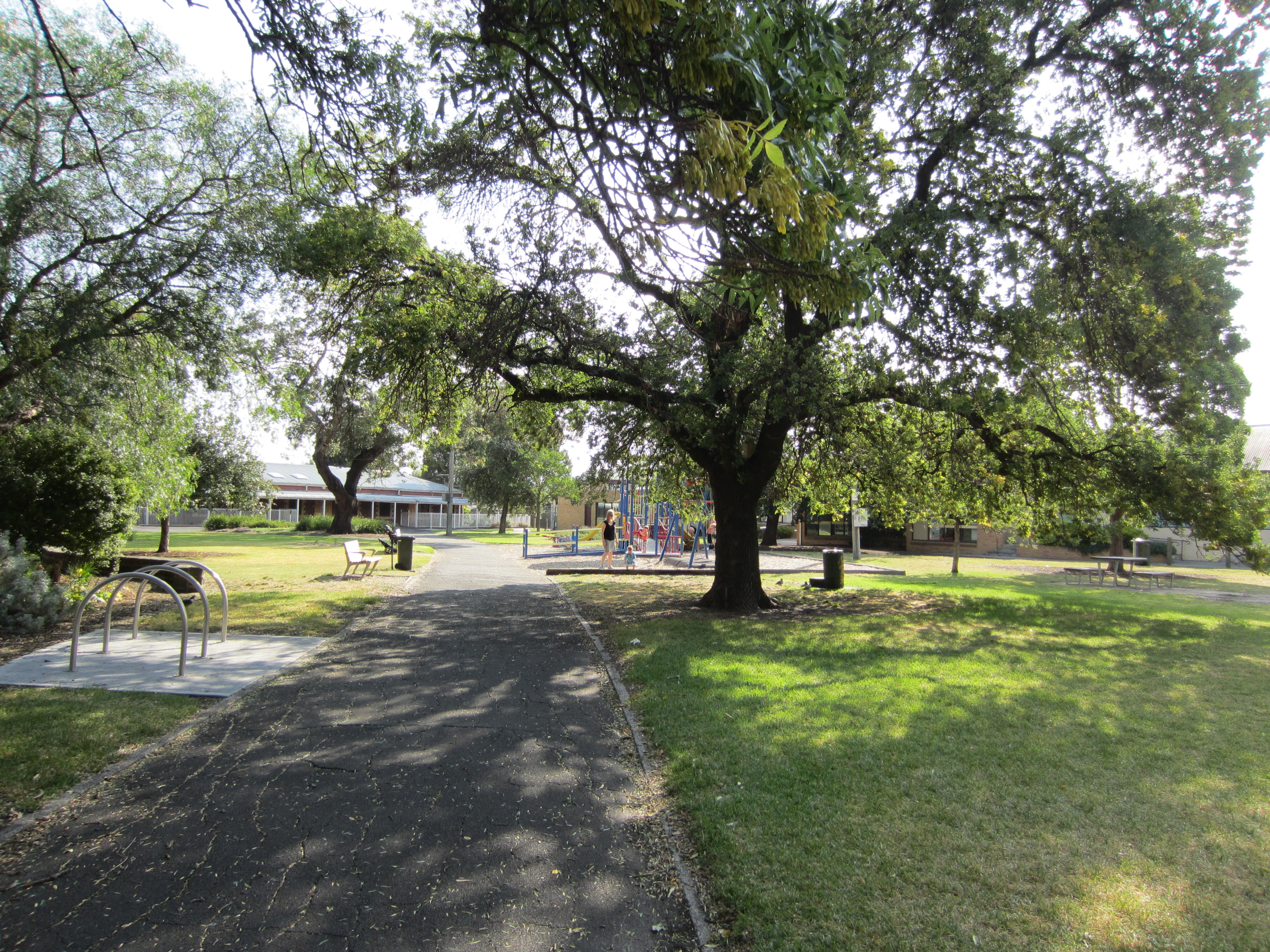
- Paine Reserve, central Newport

- Interactive map of Newport
- Coordinates: 37.842°S 144.884°E
- Country: Australia
- State: Victoria
- City: Melbourne
- LGA: City of Hobsons Bay
- Location: 10 km (6.2 mi) from Melbourne

Government
  - State electorate: Williamstown
  - Federal division: Gellibrand

Area
  - Total: 5.1 km^{2} (2.0 sq mi)
- Elevation: 18 m (59 ft)

Population
  - Total: 13,658 (2021 census)
  - Density: 2,678/km^{2} (6,940/sq mi)
- Postcode: 3015
Suburbs around Newport
Altona North	South Kingsville	Spotswood
Altona North	Newport	Port Melbourne
Altona	Williamstown North	Williamstown

Newport is an inner suburb in Melbourne, Victoria, Australia, 7.5 km (4.7 mi) south-west of Melbourne's Central Business District, located within the City of Hobsons Bay local government area. Newport recorded a population of 13,658 at the 2021 census.

Newport is approximately 10 minutes by car from Melbourne via the West Gate Freeway or a 20-minute train journey from Flinders Street.

== History ==
The Yalukit-willam people of the Boon-wurrung Country are the traditional owners of land known as Newport, with a well researched connection to the area beyond 30,000 years. First contact came with European sealers (1803–1834) and followed a pattern of violence typical across Australia at the time. In 1835, the arrival of John Batman saw a treaty established and a period of relative peace. However, despite this the plight of the Australian Aborigines was dire, as they were increasingly denied ownership and access to their lands.

European settlement began in Newport at what was then called Williamstown Junction around 1862, with a Telegraph Office and Post Office by 1869. It was renamed Newport in 1881. The Newport Railway Workshops played a key role in the development of the suburb, formerly the main workshops of the Victorian Railways. The workshops are just south of the Newport railway station. The Newport Power Station is another feature of the suburb, the chimney of which remains one of the tallest towers in Melbourne at 183 metres. The original coal-fired generators were replaced in 1981 with a single 510MW gas-fired generator and operates during peak-load periods.

== Today ==
Newport is home to people of a diverse mix of ethnic, social and economic backgrounds. It has a Mosque, a Baptist church, Catholic schools, tattoo parlours, Asian and Italian restaurants, sports clubs, boutique wine bars and an RSL. It has 12 playgrounds within just 5 km^{2}. The Substation community arts centre provides a hub for local live music performances, art exhibitions, community events and the monthly artists market. The Newport Railway Museum opens to the public on weekends, with a collection that includes many locomotives and carriages built at the Newport Railway Workshops. The Newport Folk Festival is held each year in June. Major natural features of the suburb include the Newport Lakes, Greenwich Bay and the Sandy Point Conservation area. Fishing, bike riding, skateboarding, kayaking and boating are popular local activities.

== Recreation ==
Newport Lakes Park is a bushland oasis created from a former bluestone quarry. The park is 33 hectares in size and has been extensively revegetated using native plants, with over 200 species of plants and 85 species of birds recorded here. The park has a picnic area, toilets, drinking taps and free electric barbecues. Dogs may be exercised in the Pavey's Park and Picnic Area, the north west area of the park and in the Arboretum.

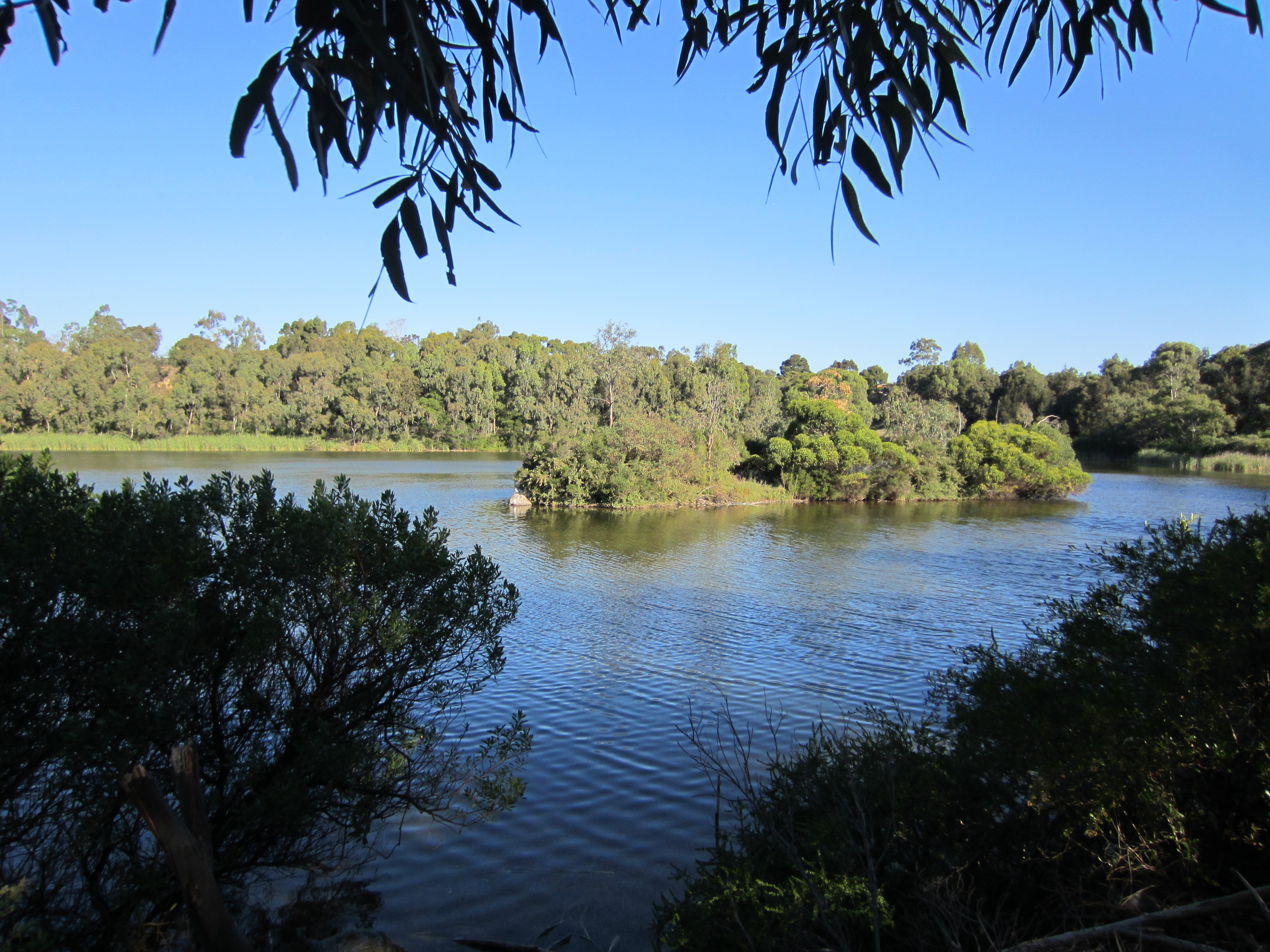
Newport Lakes

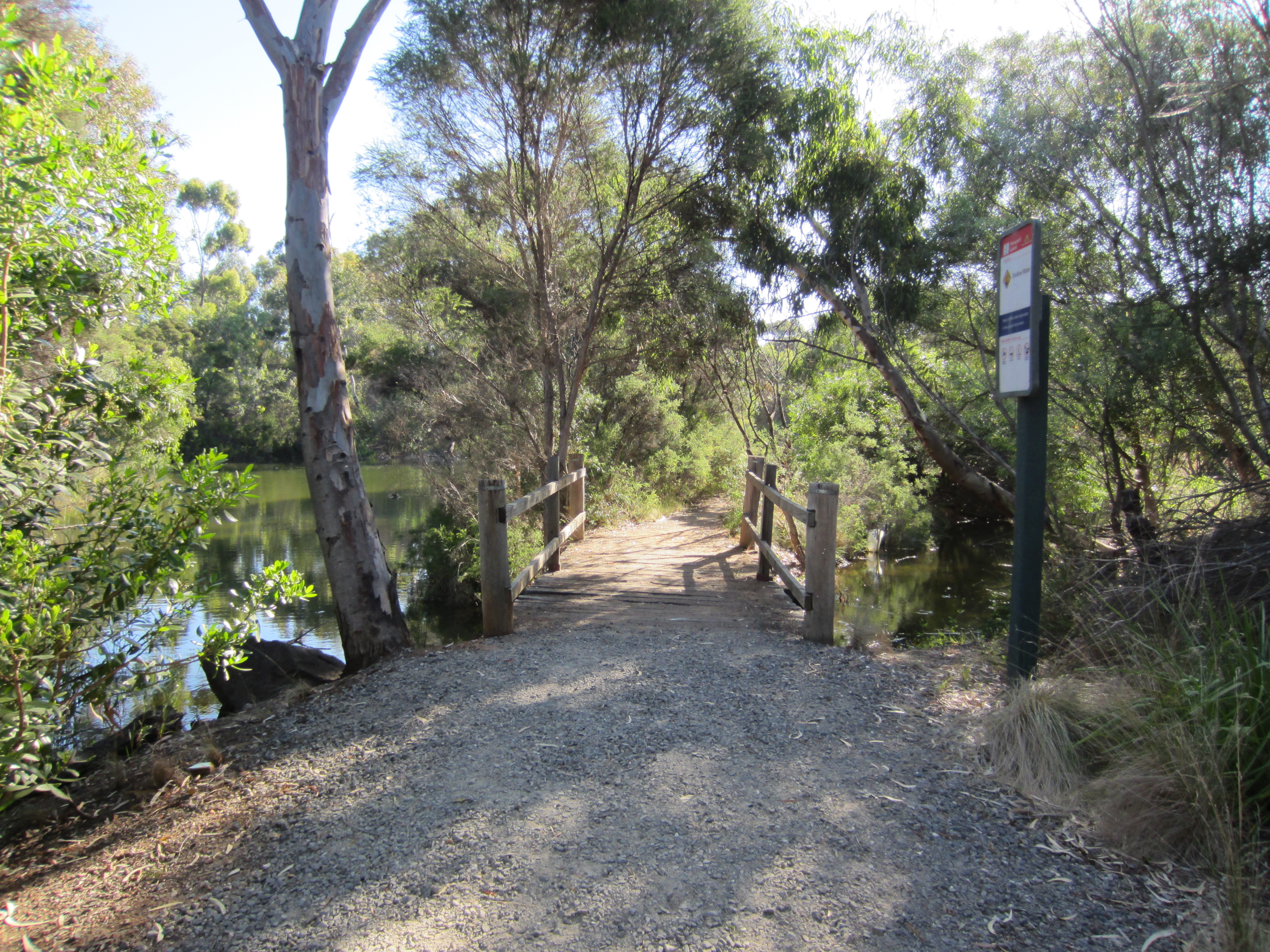
Newport Lakes trail

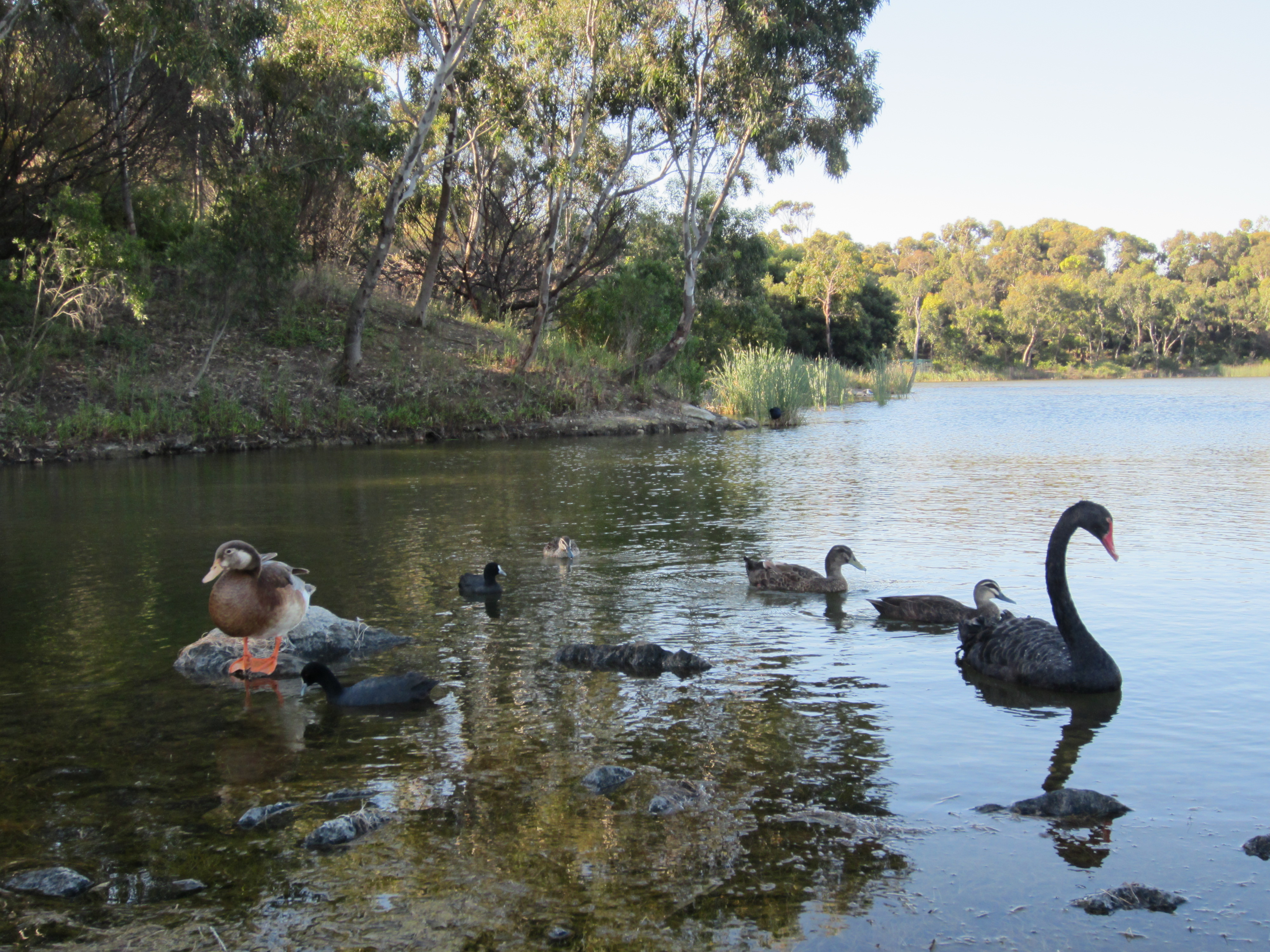
Newport Lakes bird-life

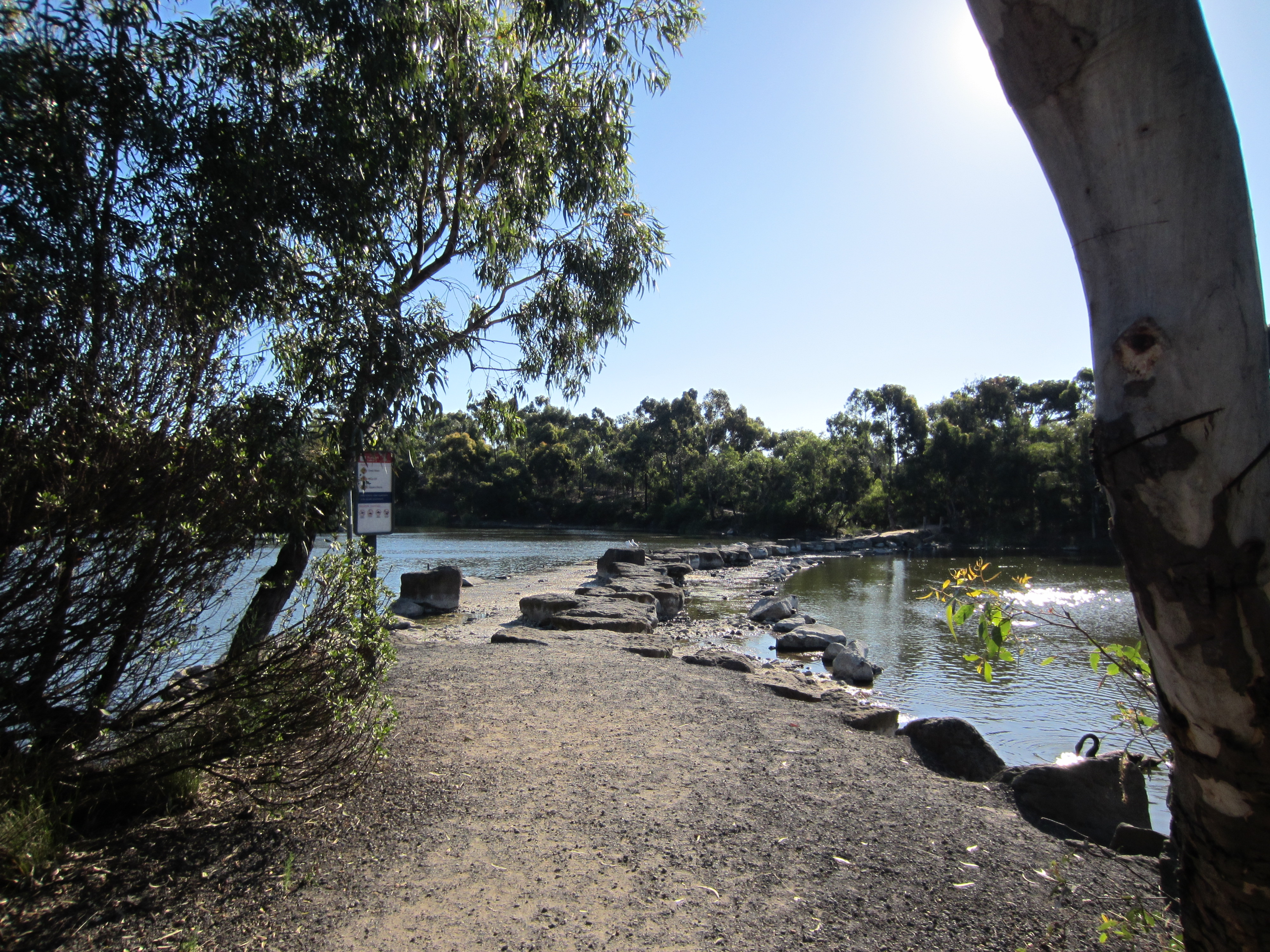
Stepping stones

Paisley Park is the major sporting park in Hobsons Bay and includes a gymnasium & swimming pool, golf course, premier league soccer facility, bowling club, badminton centre, miniature railway and lacrosse fields. It is located on the corner of Mason Street and Mills Street, Newport, and shares a boundary with Altona North.

Greenwich Reserve and The Strand are Newport's connection to the Bay. Mansions and modest apartments compete for uninterrupted views of the Melbourne CBD along The Strand, while Greenwich Reserve offers access to the Yarra River and Port Phillip Bay via The Warmies Boat Ramp and includes a large picnic area, playground, baseball field and the Sandy Point Conservation Area. A sealed cycle track runs along the river front, which is also a popular fishing spot.

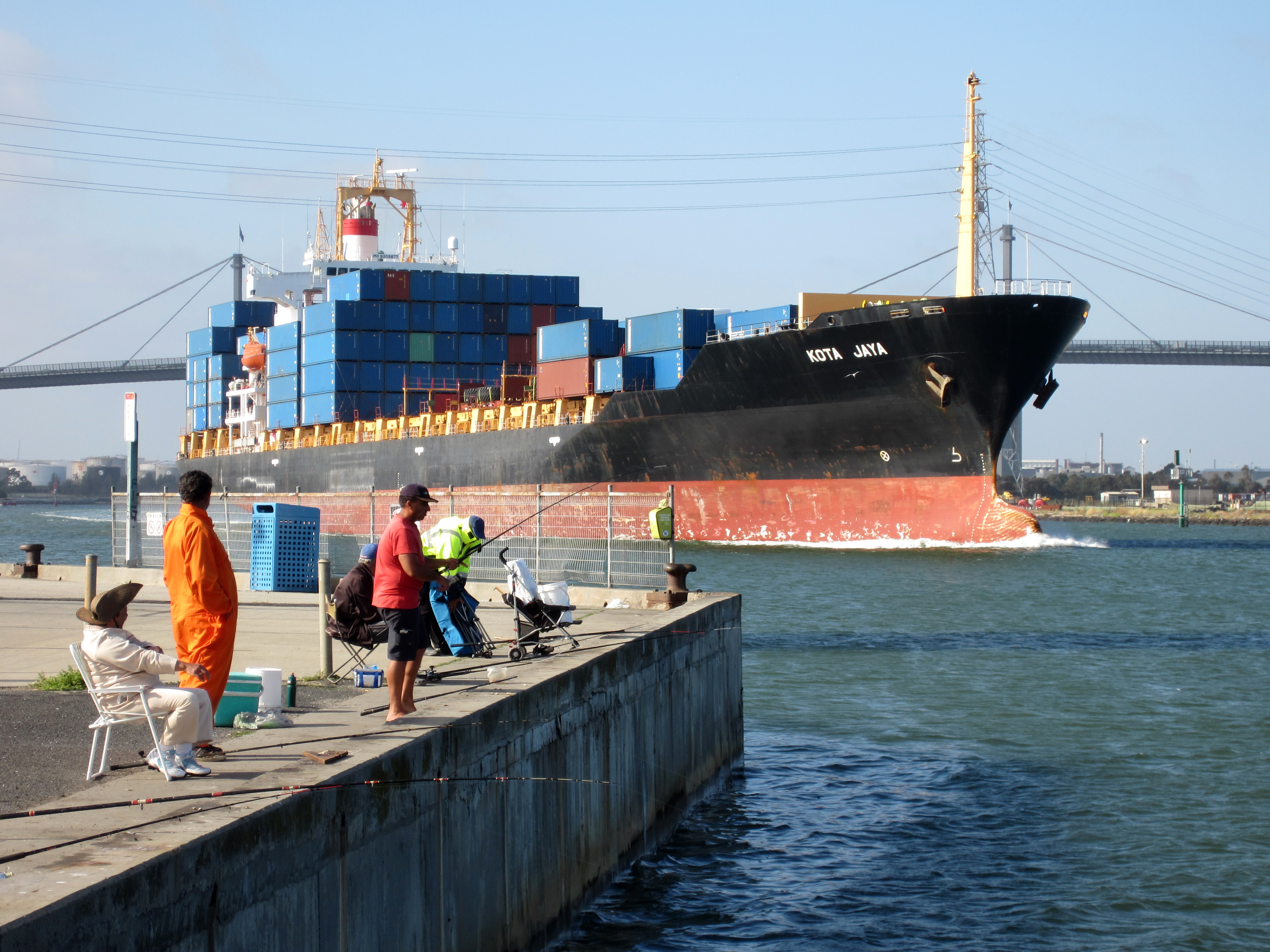
Fishing on the Yarra

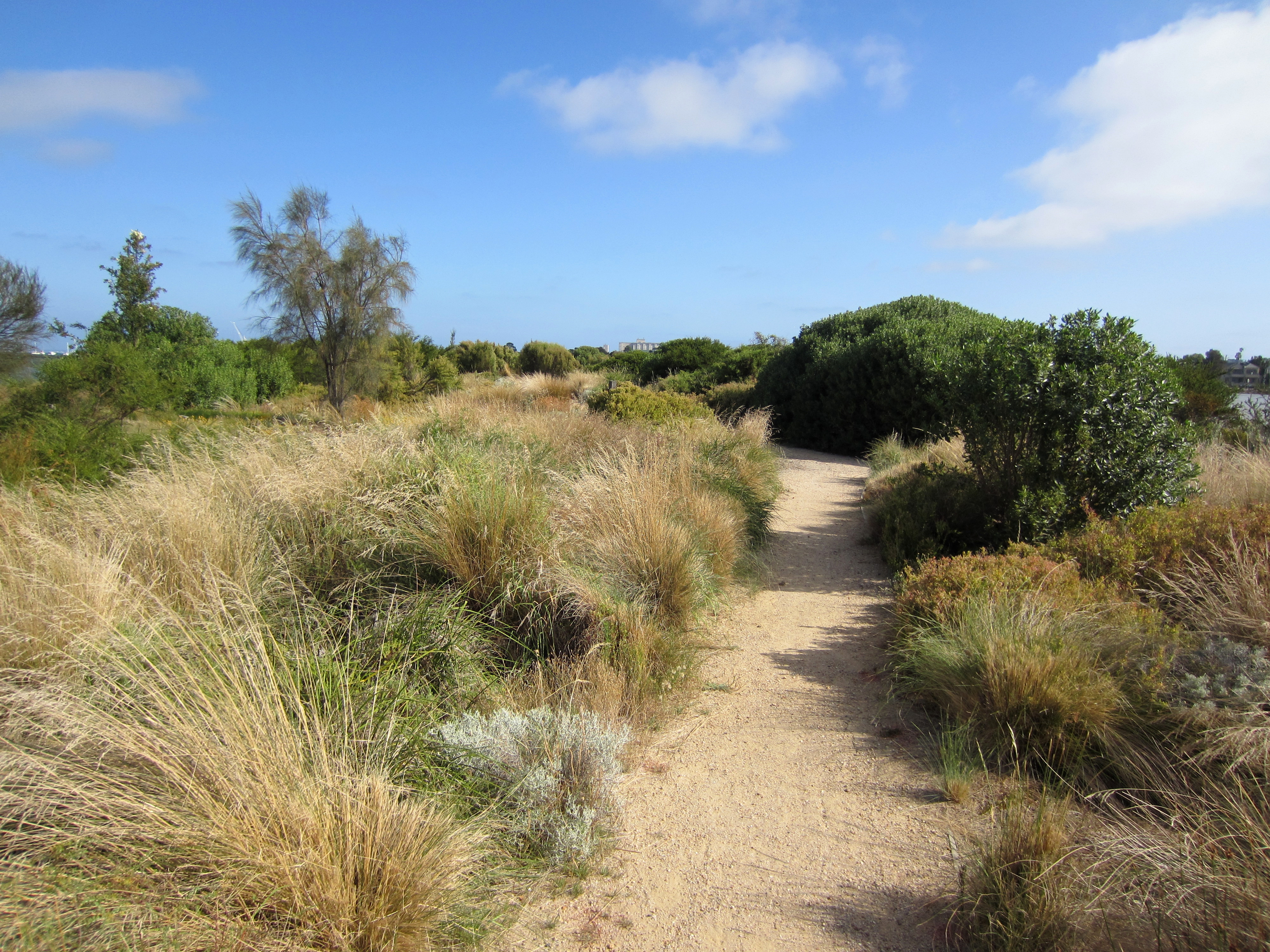
Sandy Point conservation

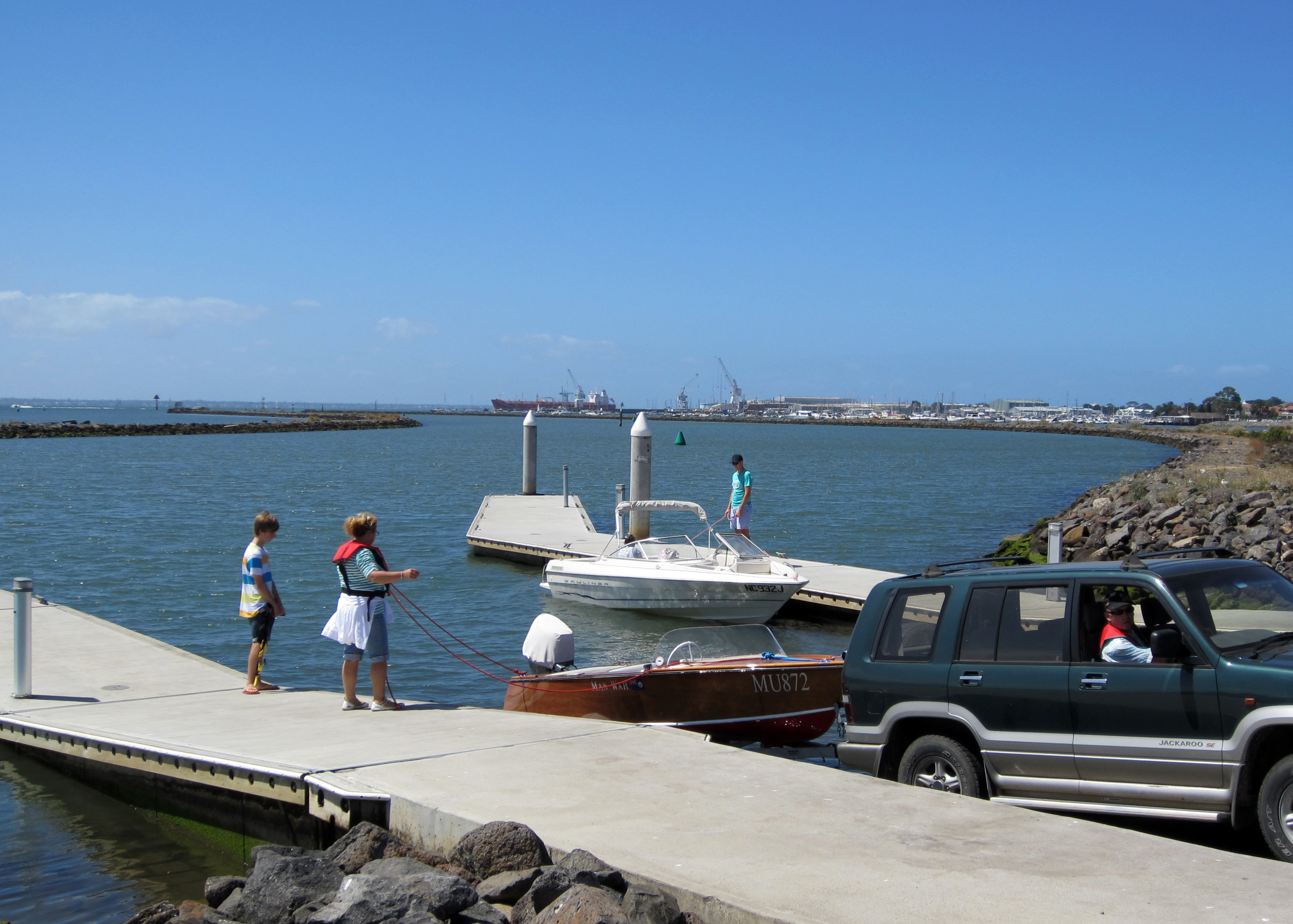
Warmies boat ramp

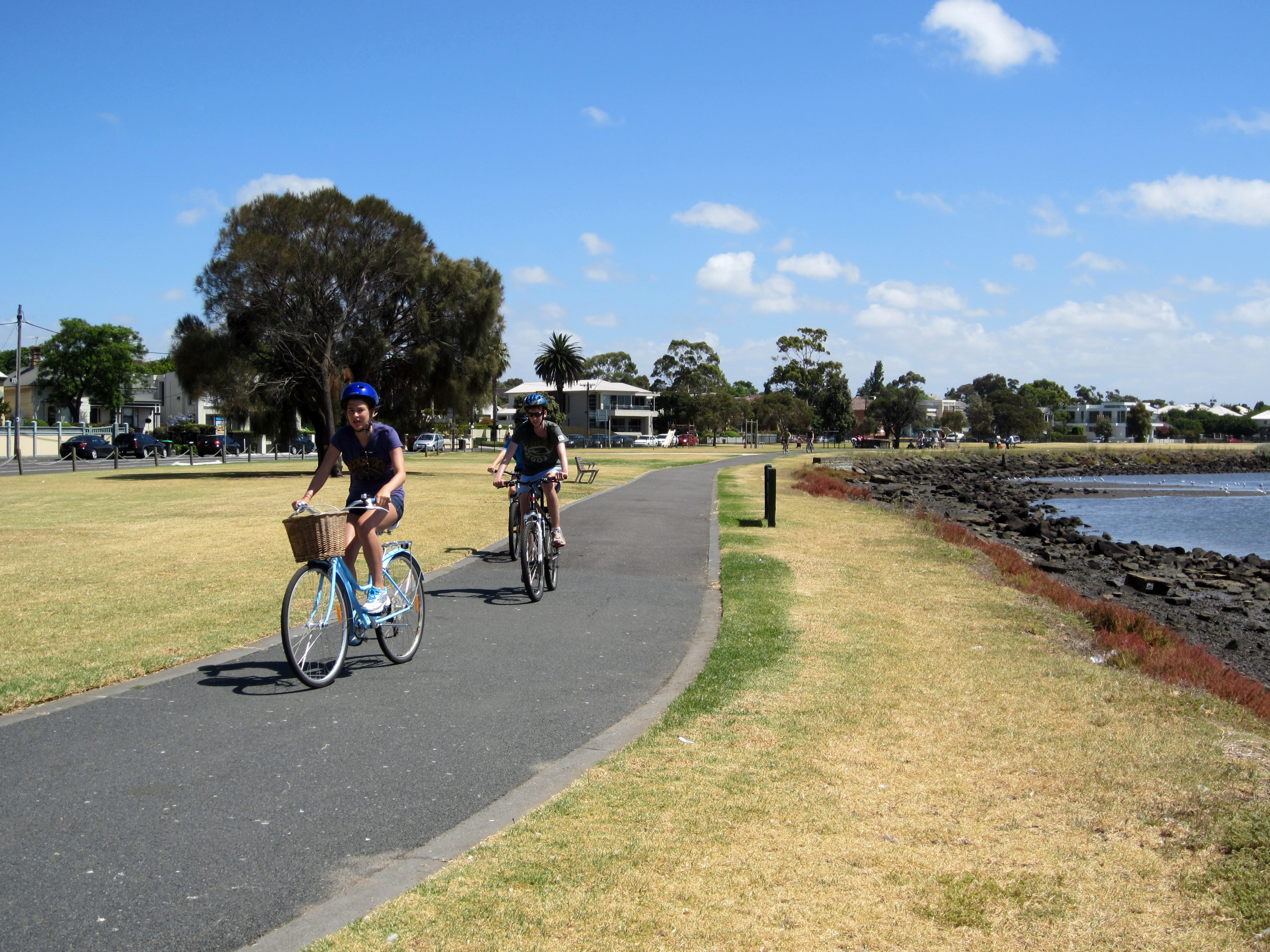
Cycle track, The Strand

Bryan Martyn Oval is home to the Newport Digman Cricket Club, Newport Power junior football and netball club and includes the recently completed Bryan Martyn Pavilion. A children's playground is provided. It is located on Derwent Street, Newport.

Newport Park includes an athletics facility featuring an eight lane 400m running track, the Graham Morrish Pavilion with toilets, canteen and first aid rooms and the Newport Skate Park, which is the largest in Hobsons Bay and hosts regular 'skate clinics'. A children's playground is provided. It is located on the corner of The Strand and Douglas Parade, Newport.

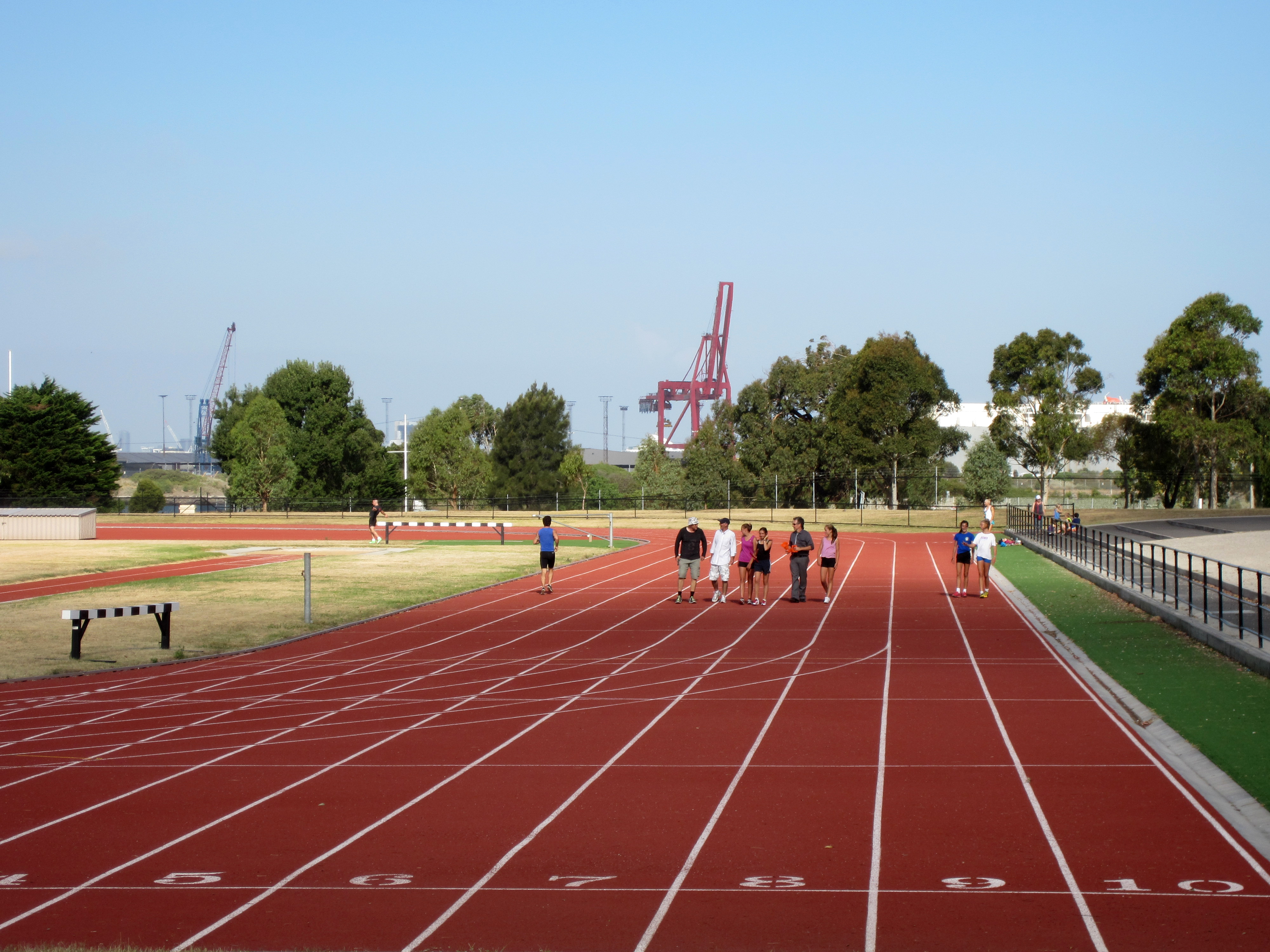
Newport Athletics Facility

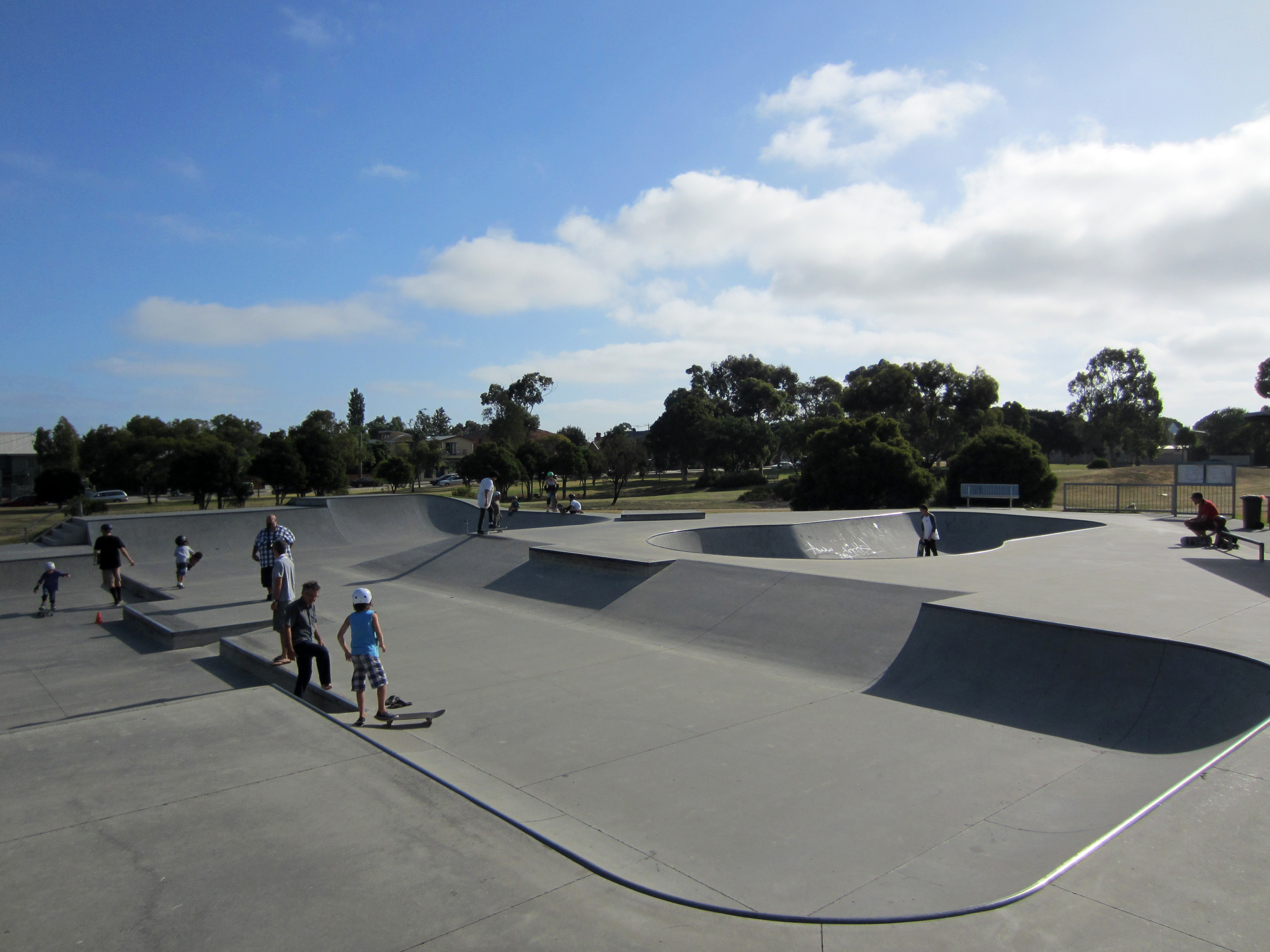
Newport Skate Park

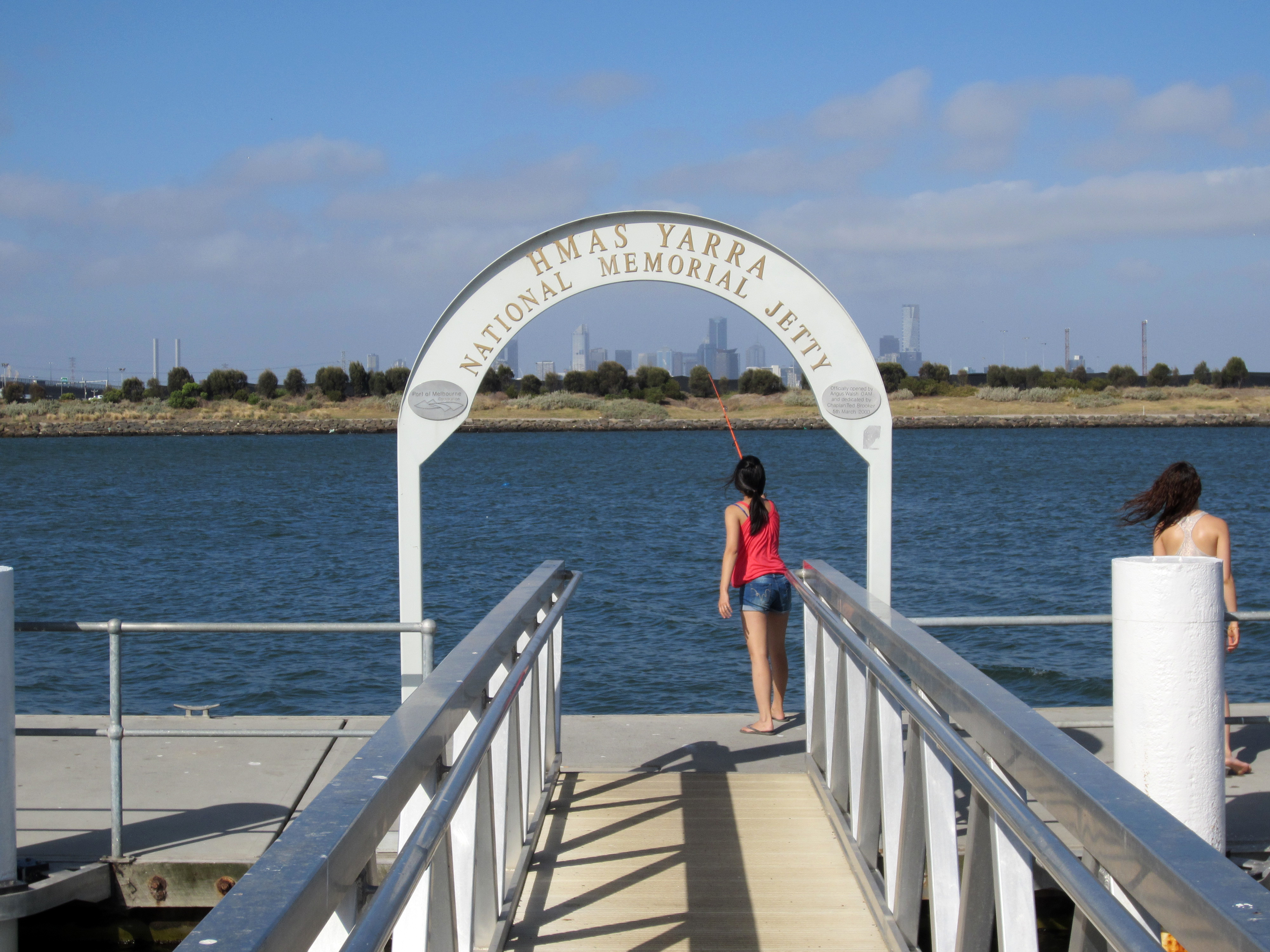
HMAS Yarra memorial jetty

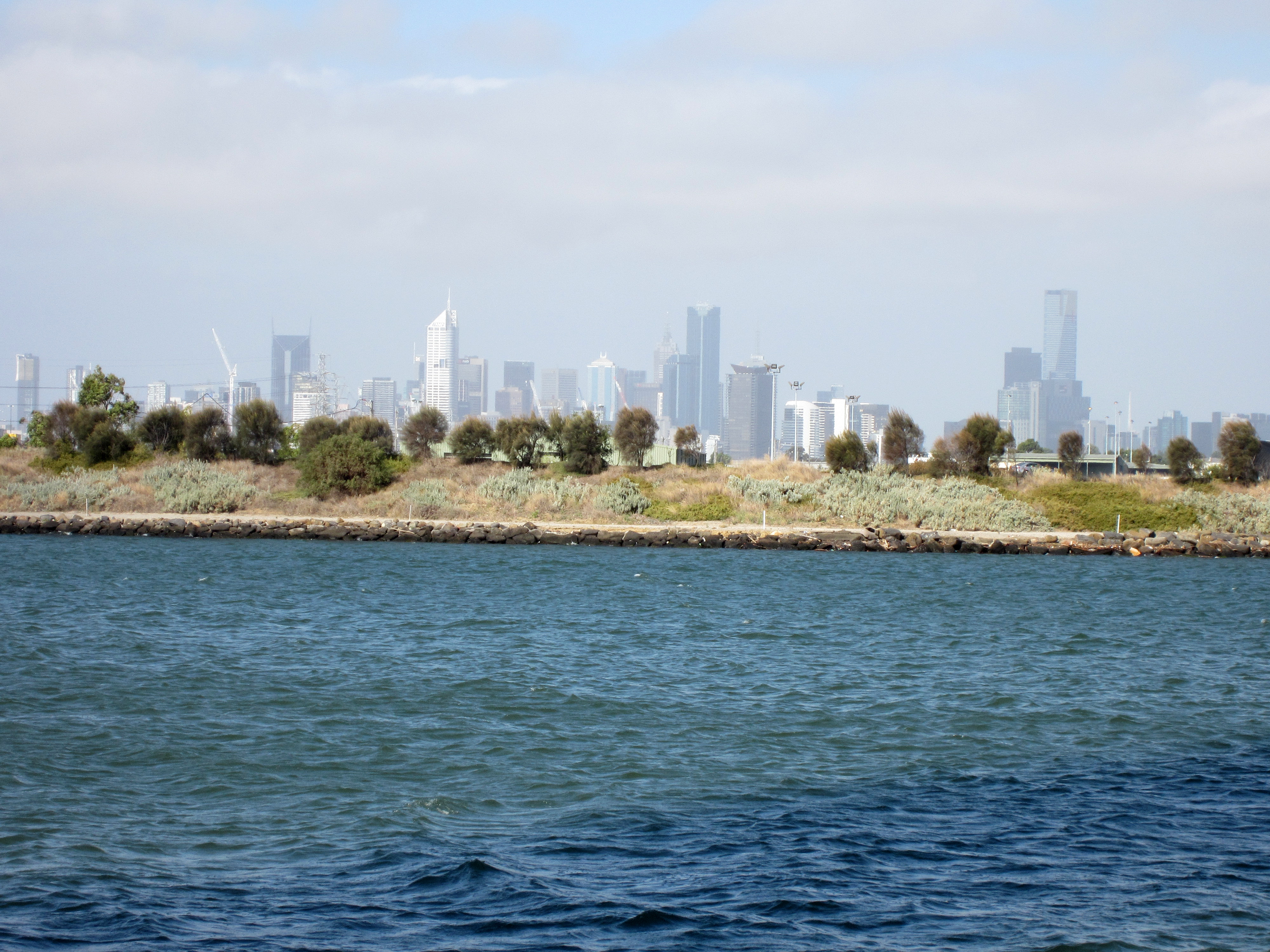
Melbourne skyline, Newport

Loft Reserve has 2 full size ovals, practice nets and a playground. It is located on Grieves Street, Newport.

Newport Bowls Club, located in Market Street, hosts both serious competition and barefoot bowling, clubhouse and bar.

Digman Reserve is home to the Newport Digman Cricket Club and Gellibrand Cricket Club and is located on Hobson Street, Newport.

The Newport Rams Baseball Club is based at the KC White Reserve in North Williamstown.

Scouts Australia run the 2nd Newport Scout group from a historic wooden hall (1938) next door to the Newport RSL on Market Street, Newport.

== Transport ==
=== Train ===
Newport is home to Newport station, which is serviced by trains on the Werribee and Williamstown railway lines.

=== Bus ===
- 432 Newport ↔ Yarraville via Altona Gate Shopping Centre
- 471 Williamstown ↔ Sunshine Station via Newport and Altona Gate Shopping Centre
- 472 Williamstown ↔ Moonee Ponds via Footscray
- 947 Footscray ↔ Newport Station via Altona North (Night Network)

=== Active transport ===
- The Bay Trail, a shared cycle track runs along the Yarra River from the West Gate Bridge through Newport to Williamstown, Altona Beach and on to Altona Meadows in the west.
- The Punt, a foot ferry across the Yarra for pedestrians and bicycles, operates between Scienceworks and Port Melbourne, travelling under the West Gate Bridge.
- Federation Trail, a 25 km dedicated cycle track, runs from Brooklyn to Werribee and is 5 km north of Newport connected by the Bay Trail and the partially complete extension from Brooklyn to Melbourne Rd.

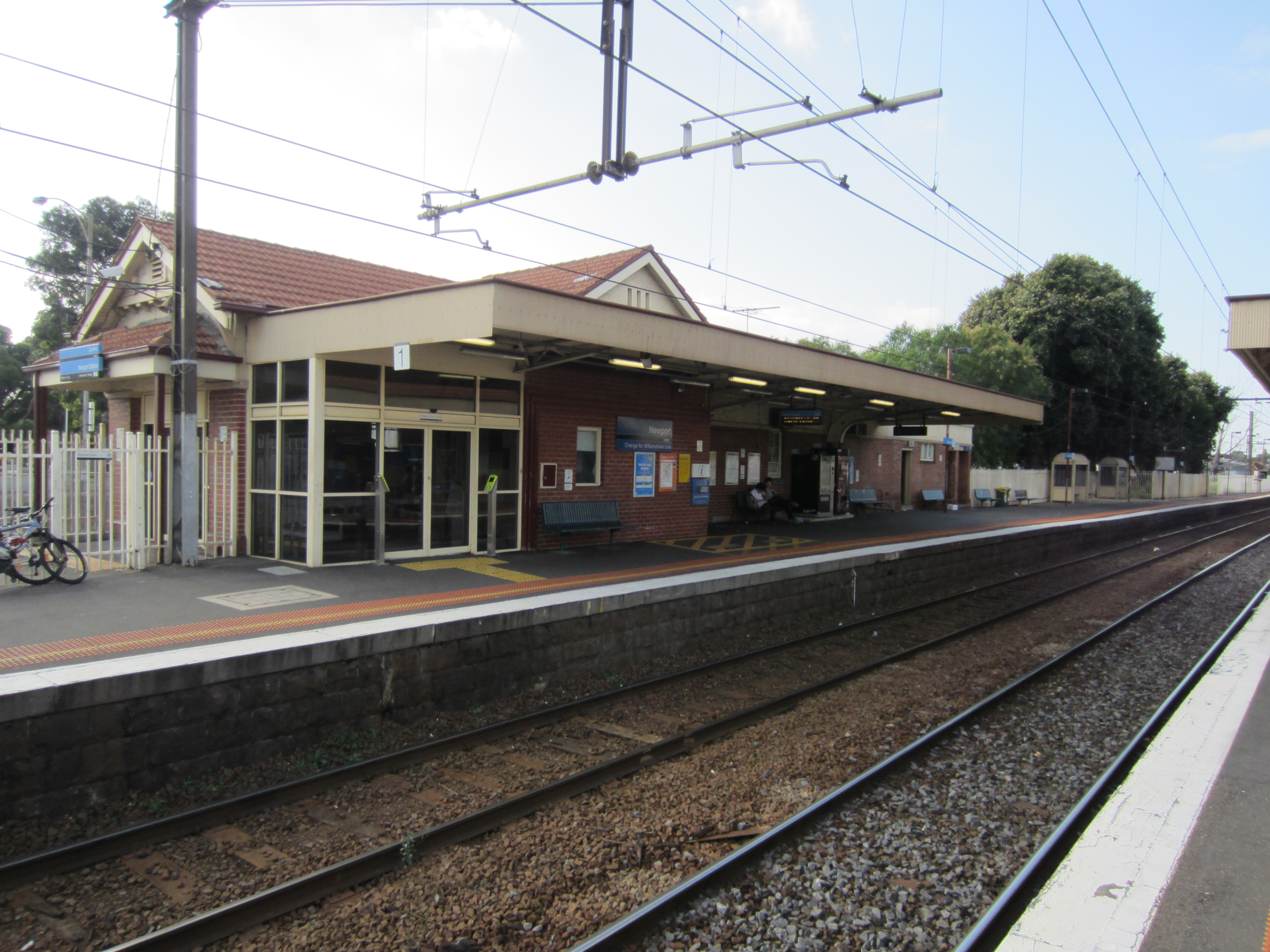
Newport railway station

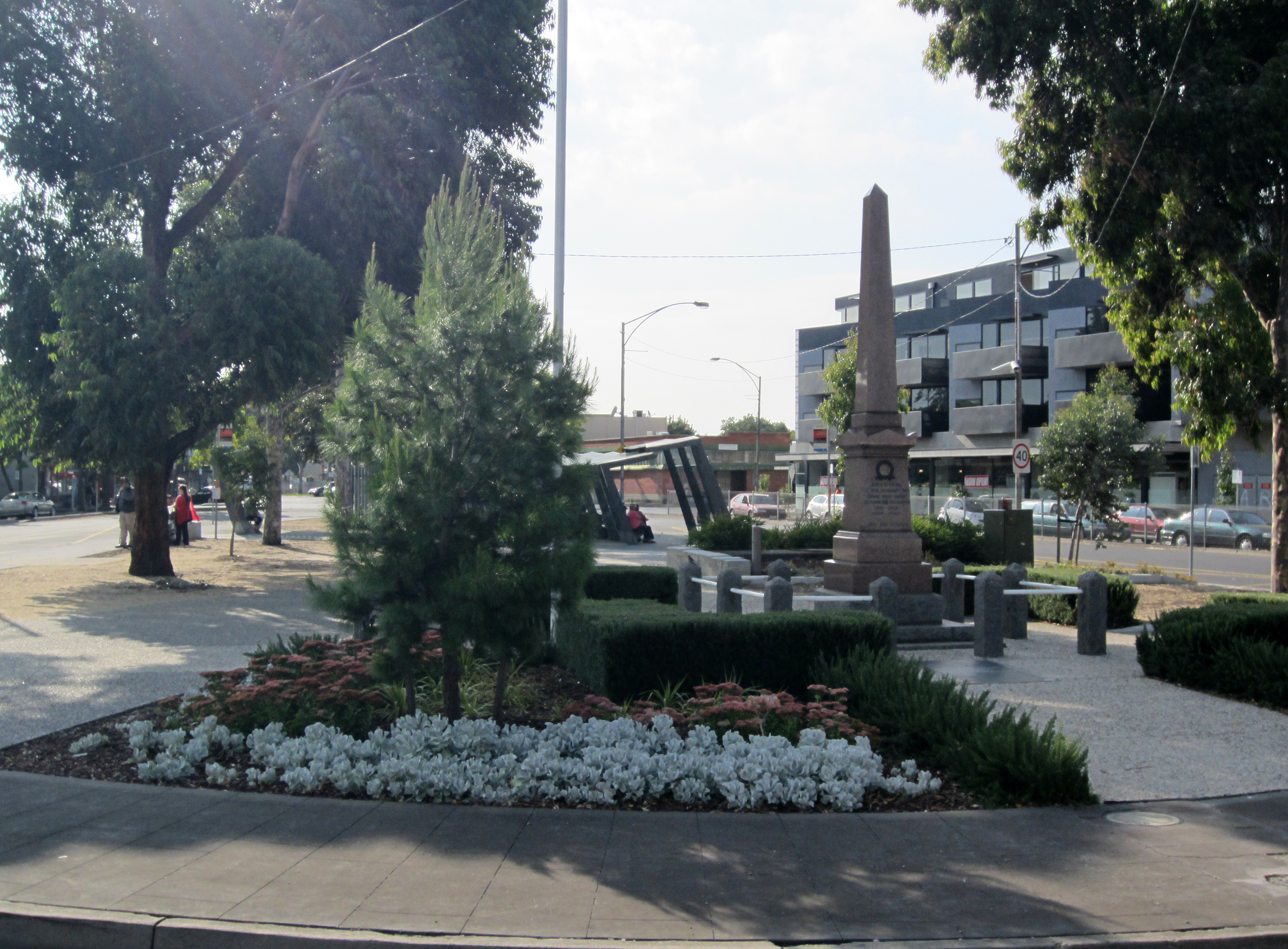
Bus & Rail Interchange

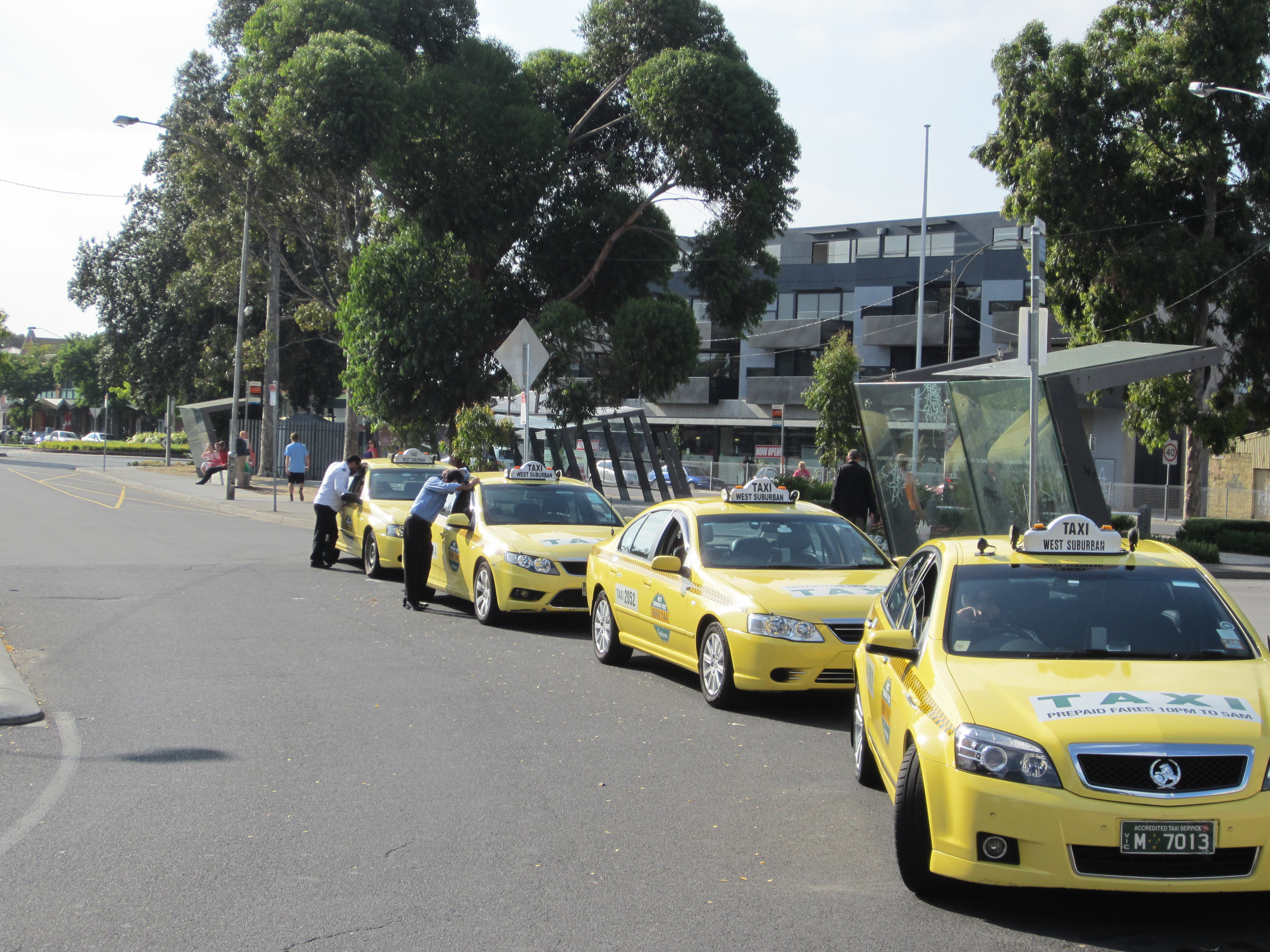
Taxi Rank, Market St

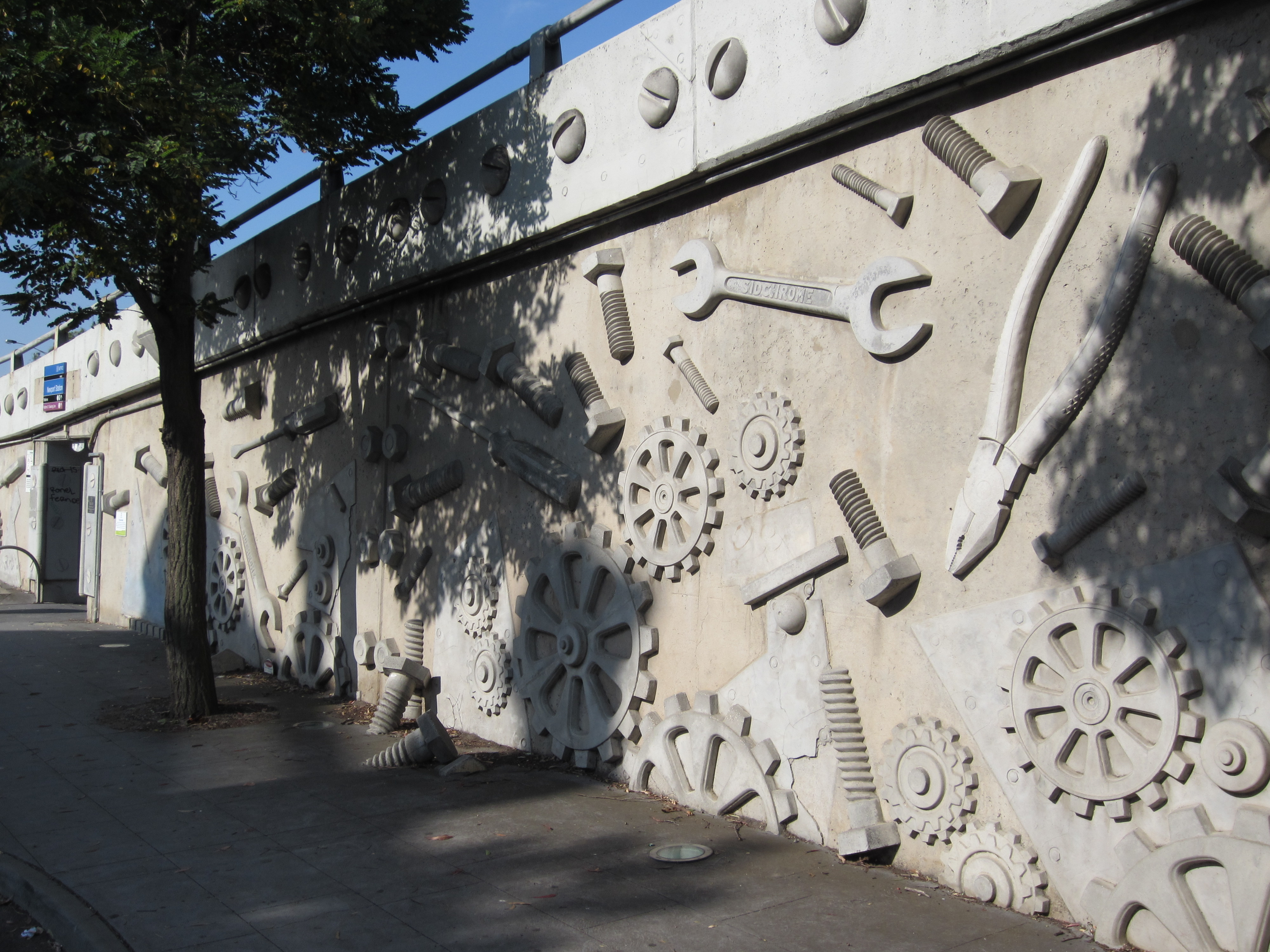
Pedestrian underpass art

== Education ==
Hobsons Bay City Council operates two kindergartens in Newport, Home Road Kindergarten and Newport Gardens Early Years Centre.

Schools include Newport Gardens Primary School (formerly Hobsons Bay), Newport Lakes Primary School, Sacred Heart Catholic Primary School and the senior campus of Bayside College.

Victoria University maintains a campus in Newport, which focuses on automotive, metal fabrication, building and electrical trades. The Newport campus hosts the Centre for Curriculum Innovation and Development.

The Newport Maternal and Child Health Centre is located within the Newport Early Years Centre.

== Culture ==
The Substation

Formerly known as The Hobsons Bay Community Arts Centre, The Substation is a contemporary, community-based arts centre located in the historic Newport substation building, adjacent to the Newport Railway Station on Market Street. Originally constructed in 1915 to convert electricity for the Victorian Railways, this massive neo-classical brick building had fallen into disrepair by the 1960s. Local residents embarked on the enormous task of restoring the building and converting it into a community arts facility and after 12 years of work it officially opened its doors to the public in 2008.

Regular events include the annual Substation Contemporary Art Prize, the Carpark Fiesta, the monthly Artists' Market, the Koori Night Market, children's theatre, Westside Circus, dance classes, life-drawing, public forums, an art exhibition program across 5 gallery spaces and a diverse range of performance including cabaret, comedy, jazz and contemporary music.

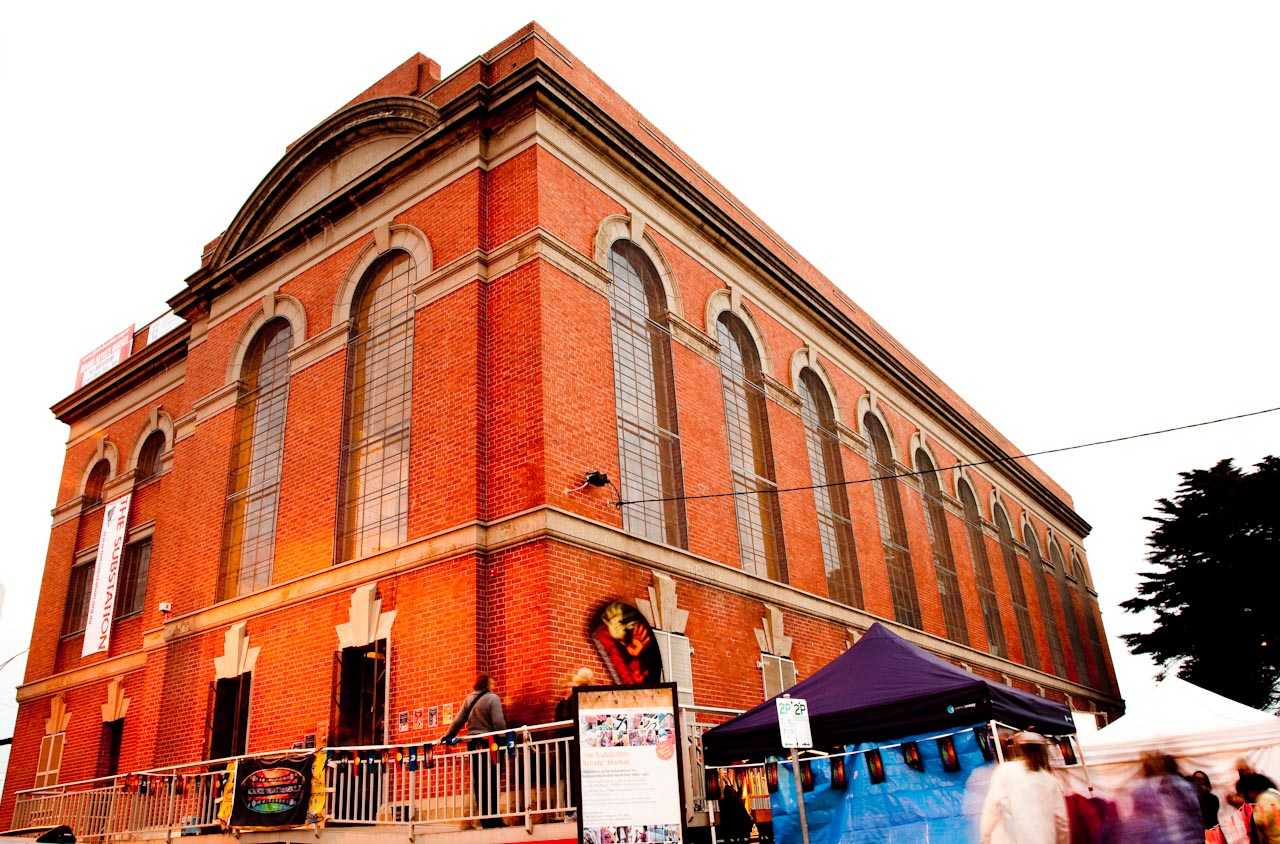
Substation Arts Centre

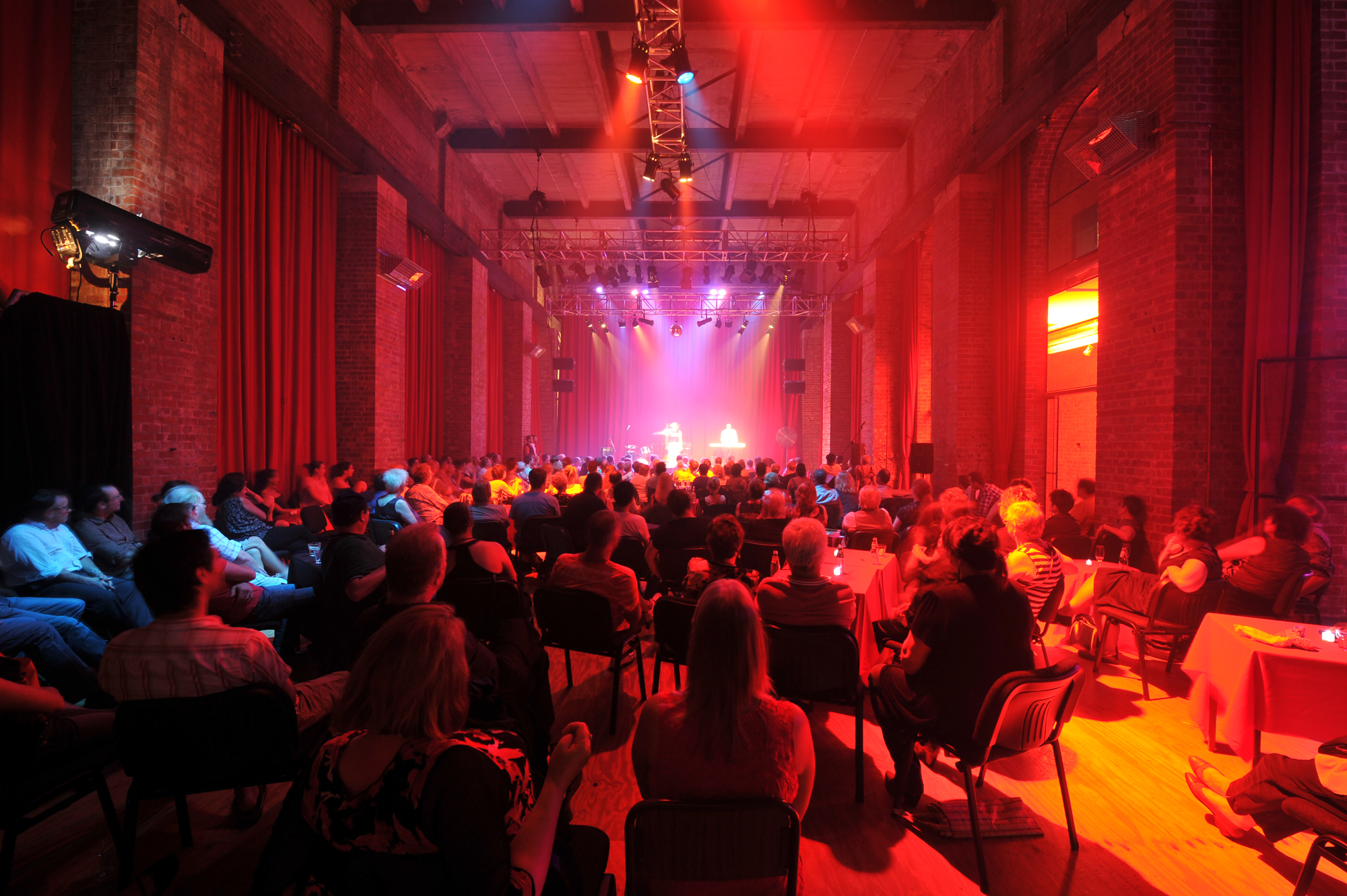
Cabaret in the Hall

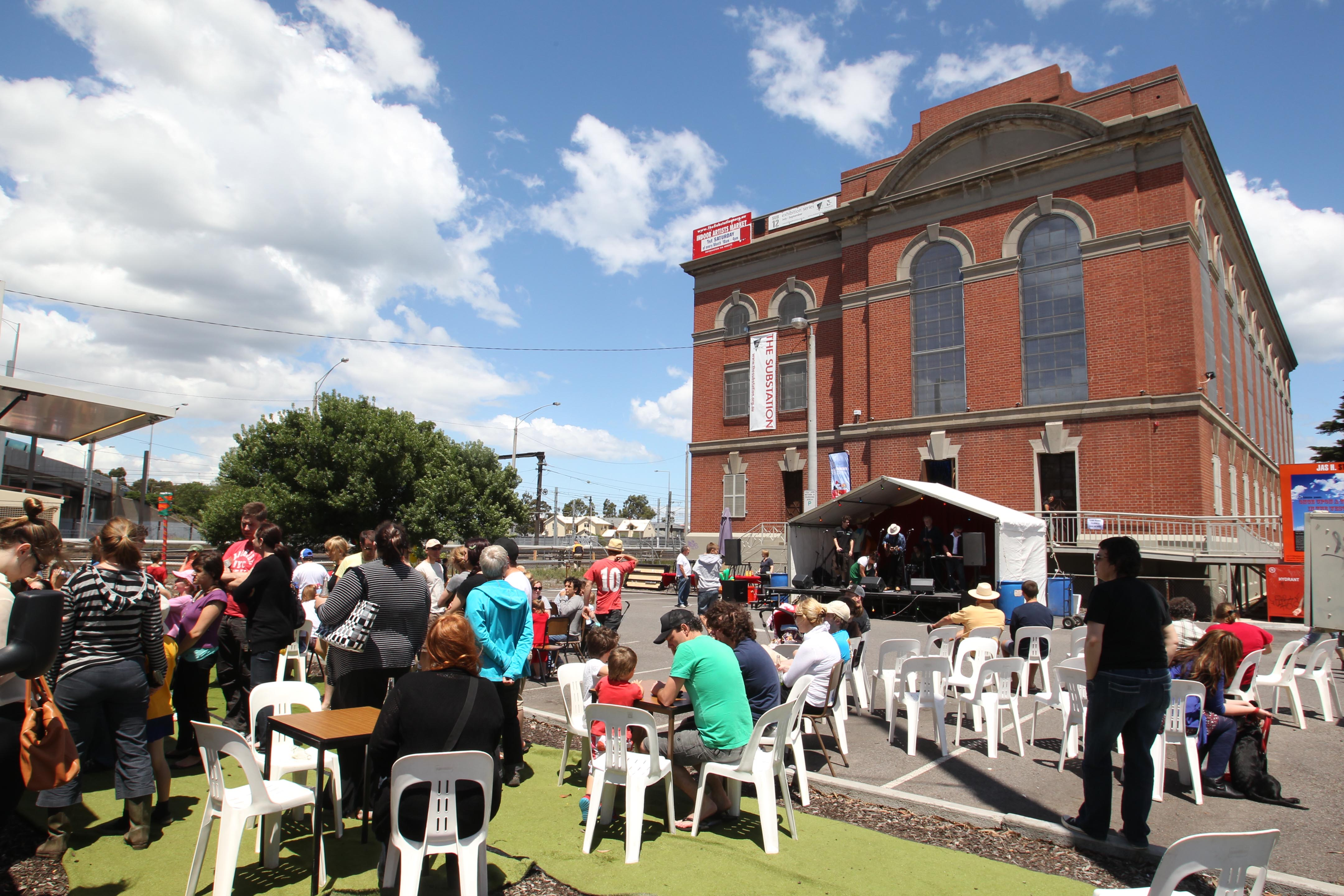
Carpark Fiesta

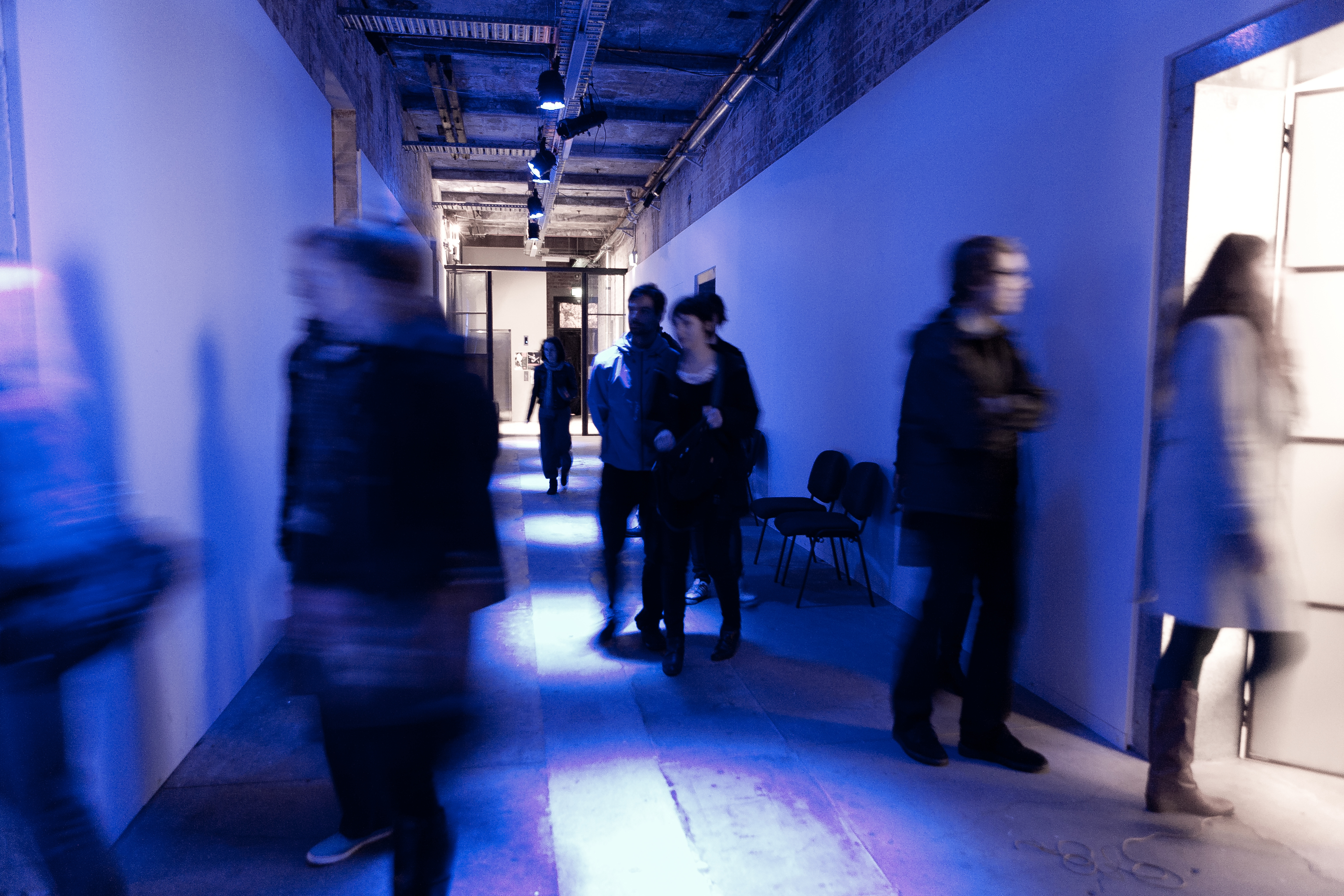
Substation galleries

Newport Folk Festival

The Newport Folk Festival is an annual music event held over 2 days in July organised by the Newport Fiddle and Folk Club.

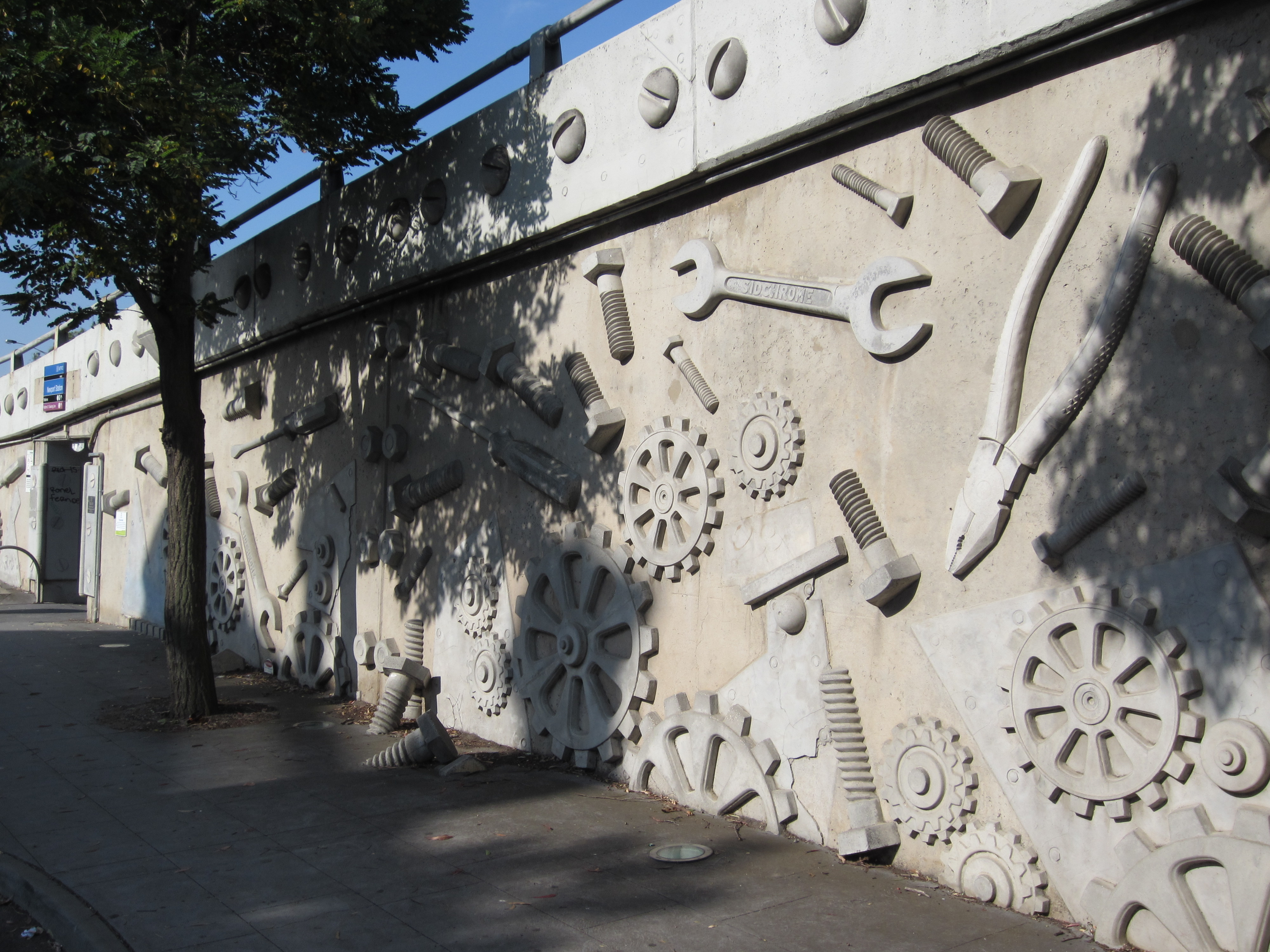
Railway underpass art

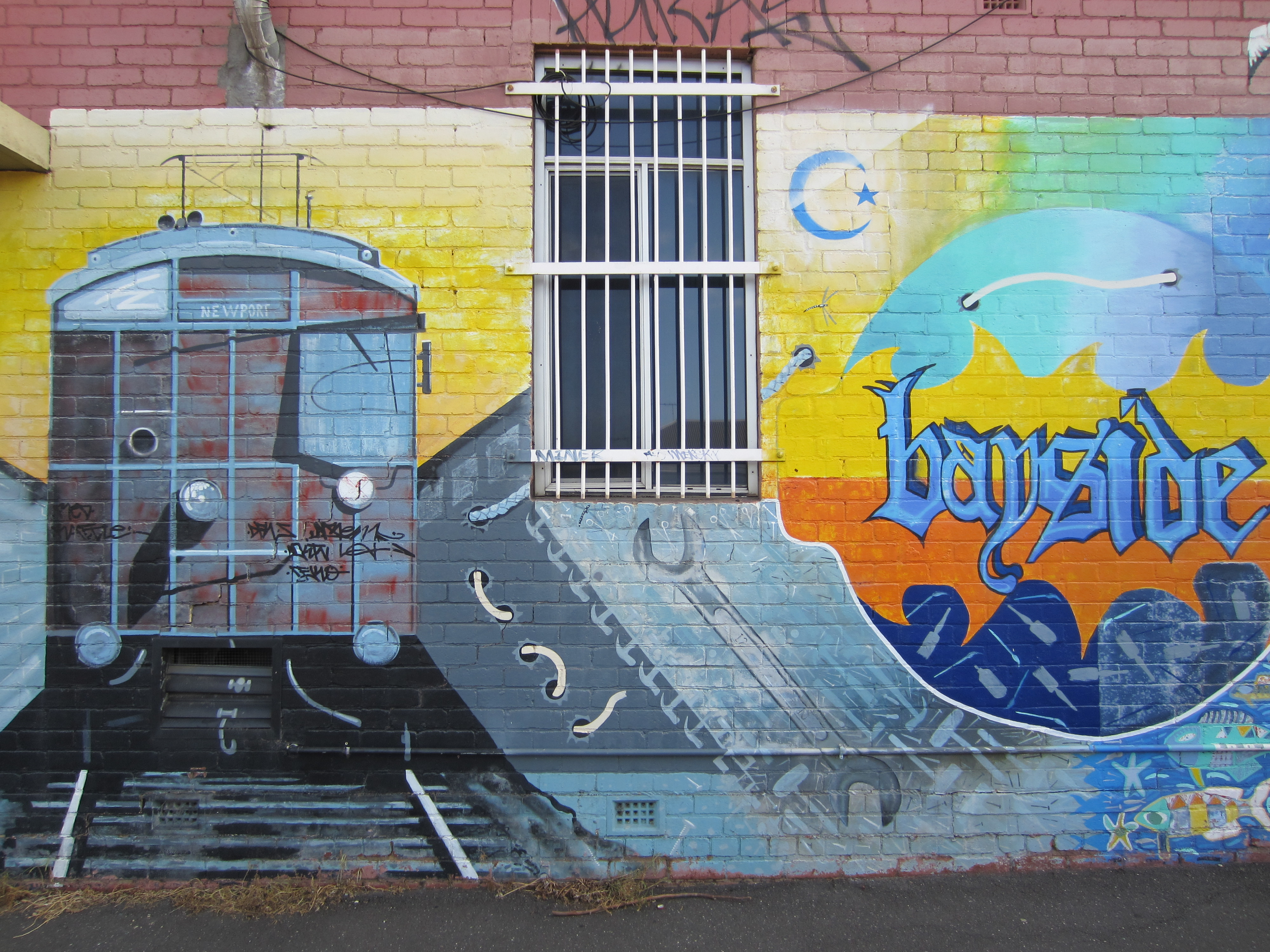
Street art, off Hall Street

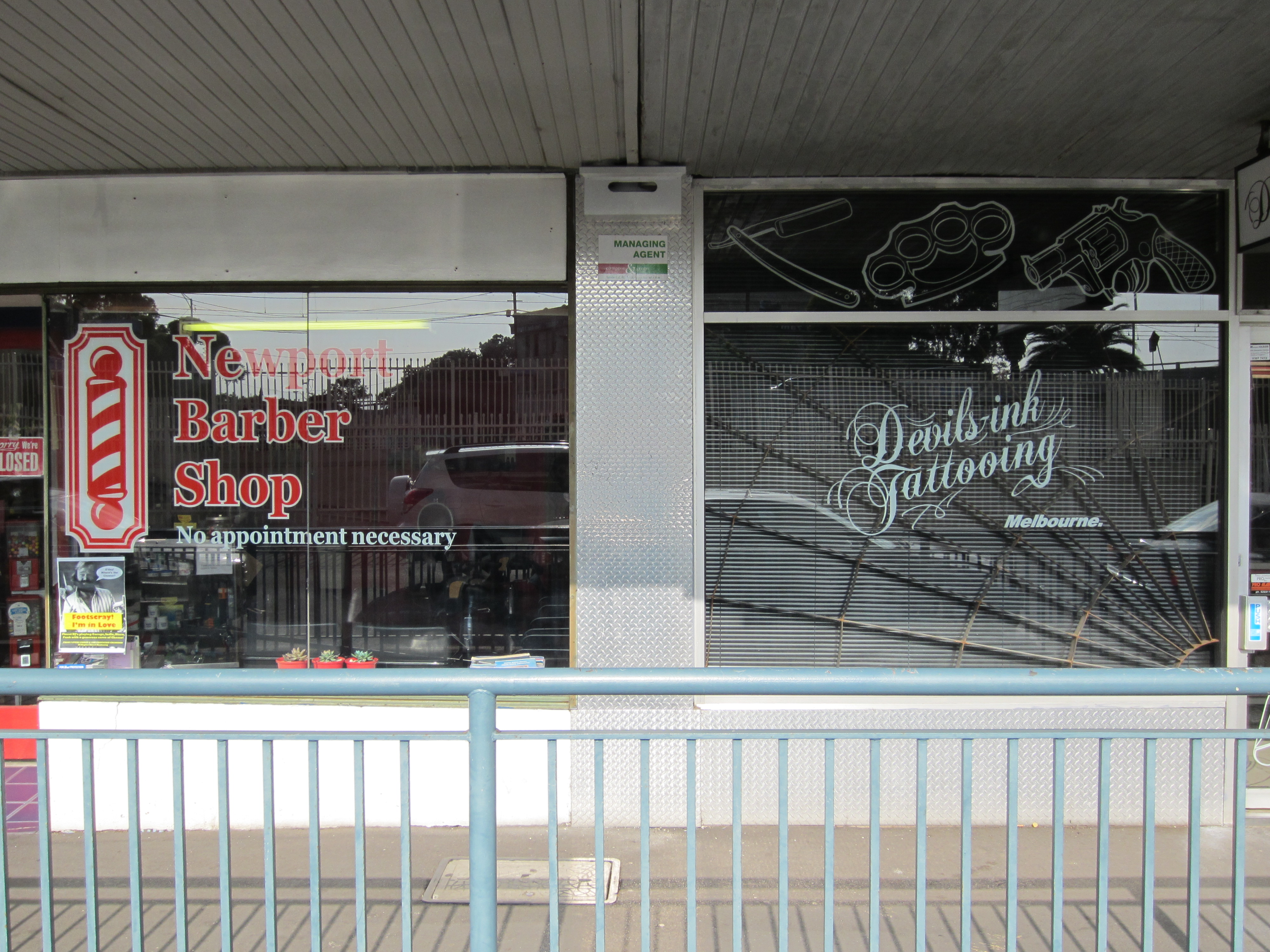
Hall Street shops

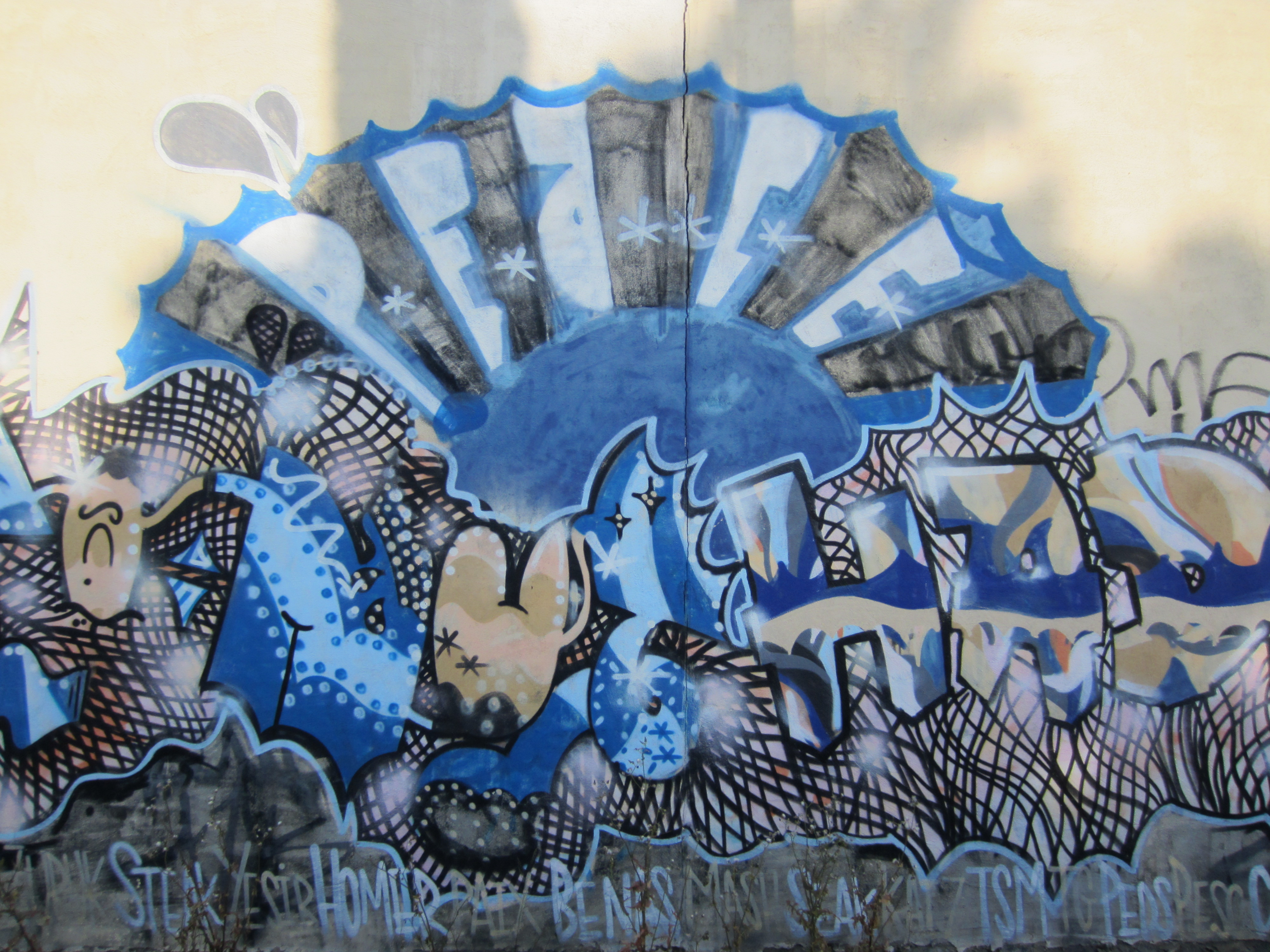
Street art, off Derwent Street

Australian Islamic Centre

The Australian Islamic Centre is an initiative by the Newport Islamic Society and is located in Newport. It was designed by world-renowned architect Glenn Murcutt and opened in 2016.

== Notable people ==
- Bob Addison, Australian rules footballer
- Andrew Barlow, cricket umpire
- Dick Bliss, Australian rules footballer
- Nicky Bomba, musician
- Bill Brown, Australian rules footballer
- Harry Dern, Australian rules footballer
- George Fewster, politician
- Mama Kin, musician
- Luke Mathews, middle-distance runner
- Doug Menzies, Australian rules footballer
- Harry Neill, Australian rules footballer
- Kevin O'Brien, Australian rules footballer
- Frank O'Connor, Australian rules footballer
- Charlie Page, Australian rules footballer
- Ray Scriven, Australian rules footballer
- Michael Shanks, Australian filmmaker
- Reginald Sturgess, artist
- Mark Tandy, Australian rules footballer
- Stan Whight, Australian rules footballer

== See also ==
- City of Williamstown – Newport was previously within this former local government area.
