= Doug Menzies =

Australian rules footballer, born 1915

Personal information
- Full name: William Douglas Menzies
- Born: 28 January 1915; Newport, Victoria
- Died: 23 February 1999 (aged 84)
- Original team: West Footscray
- Height: 178 cm (5 ft 10 in)
- Weight: 73 kg (161 lb)

Playing career^{1}
| Years | Club | Games (Goals) |
| 1937–39 | Footscray | 14 (3) |
- ^{1} Playing statistics correct to the end of 1939.

William Douglas Menzies (28 January 1915 – 23 February 1999) was an Australian rules footballer who played with Footscray in the Victorian Football League (VFL).

He joined Williamstown in June 1939 and played on the wing and was named amongst the best players in 'Town's 1939 premiership win over Brunswick at the MCG before a crowd of 47,098.

Menzies enlisted in the Royal Australian Navy in September 1940 during World War II. He was discharged in March 1945 and returned to play two further games with Williamstown before retiring at the age of 30 with a total of 28 games and 2 goals in the royal blue and gold.
