= Harry Neill =

Australian rules footballer (1907–1966)

Personal information
- Full name: Harold John Neill
- Born: 11 February 1907; Newport, Victoria
- Died: 22 November 1966 (aged 59); Williamstown, Victoria
- Original team: Williamstown (VFA)
- Height: 185 cm (6 ft 1 in)
- Weight: 86 kg (190 lb)

Playing career^{1}
| Years | Club | Games (Goals) |
| 1925 | South Melbourne | 2 (0) |
| 1925–1927 | Footscray | 17 (3) |
| 1927–1933 | St Kilda | 84 (58) |
| Total | | 103 (61) |
- ^{1} Playing statistics correct to the end of 1933.

Harold John Neill (11 February 1907 – 22 November 1966) was an Australian rules footballer who played with South Melbourne, Footscray and St Kilda in the VFL.

A follower, Neill had stints with Williamstown, South Melbourne and Footscray before arriving at St Kilda where he played the majority of his football. He was St Kilda's best and fairest winner in 1931.
