= Kevin O'Brien (Australian footballer) =

Australian rules footballer (1932–2020)

Personal information
- Full name: Kevin James O'Brien
- Born: 10 April 1932; Newport, Victoria
- Died: 24 September 2020 (aged 88); Queensland
- Original team: Old Paradians
- Height: 188 cm (6 ft 2 in)
- Weight: 98.5 kg (217 lb)

Playing career^{1}
Years	Club	Games (Goals)
1954, 1956–57	Carlton	9 (3)
- ^{1} Playing statistics correct to the end of 1957.

Kevin James O'Brien (10 April 1932 – 24 September 2020) was an Australian rules footballer who played with Carlton in the Victorian Football League (VFL).
