= Ray Scriven =

Australian rules footballer, born 1912

Personal information
- Full name: Raymond Kirk Scriven
- Born: 9 January 1912; Newport, Victoria
- Died: 28 May 1994 (aged 82)
- Original team: Newport
- Height: 170 cm (5 ft 7 in)
- Weight: 67 kg (148 lb)

Playing career^{1}
Years	Club	Games (Goals)
1935–38	Richmond	34 (2)
1939	Coburg (VFA)	18 (6)
1941	Brunswick (VFA)	
- ^{1} Playing statistics correct to the end of 1941.

Raymond Kirk Scriven (9 January 1912 – 28 May 1994) was an Australian rules footballer who played with Richmond in the Victorian Football League (VFL).

A wingman, Scriven came to Richmond via Newport and the Fitzroy Reserves. After his time with Richmond, Scriven moved to Coburg and then Brunswick in the Victorian Football Association.

Scriven subsequently served in the Australian Army during World War II.
