= Dick Bliss =

Australian rules footballer

Personal information
- Full name: Benjamin Charles Bliss
- Born: 7 April 1881; Newport, Victoria
- Died: 3 September 1935 (aged 54); Deniliquin, New South Wales
- Original team: Port Melbourne (VFA)
- Height: 190 cm (6 ft 3 in)

Playing career^{1}
Years	Club	Games (Goals)
1901–02	Port Melbourne (VFA)	23 (4)
1904	Boulder City (GFL (WA))	
1905	Boulder Stars (GFL (WA))	
1906	South Melbourne	1 (0)
1906–09	Williamstown (VFA)	19 (8)
- ^{1} Playing statistics correct to the end of 1906.

Benjamin Charles "Dick" Bliss (7 April 1881 – 3 September 1935) was an Australian rules footballer who played with South Melbourne in the Victorian Football League (VFL).

== Family ==
The son of Henry Bliss (1826-1906), and Emma Bliss (1835–1911), née Buxton, Benjamin Charles Bliss was born at Newport, Victoria on 7 April 1881.

He married Janet Campbell Caldwell in 1907.

== Football ==
=== Port Melbourne (VFA) ===
'Dick' Bliss commenced his football career with Port Melbourne in 1901, on debut securing the praise of The Age correspondent who wrote that "the best game on the other side was played by a young giant named Bliss, who before last Saturday had never played a game of football with a recognised club of any sort". He played a total of 18 games over two seasons for Port Melbourne, missing four games through a suspension for fighting in 1902.

=== Boulder City (GFA) ===
In June 1903 Bliss travelled to the Western Australian goldfields; and in 1904 he played for Boulder City in the Goldfields Football Association.

=== Interstate football ===
In July 1904 he was selected to represent Western Australia in the first-ever West Australian interstate team, which played against a Victorian Football League (VFL) representative side in Melbourne on 6 August 1904, and against a South Australian Football Association (SAFA) representative side in Adelaide on 20 August 1904. He played well.

=== Boulder Stars (GFA) ===
In 1905 Bliss moved to the newly formed Boulder Stars team (one of the few times he appears as B. C. Bliss in football records) and he played for this team for one season.

=== South Melbourne (VFL) ===
In 1906 Bliss returned to Victoria and secured a permit to play with South Melbourne, and played a single game for them against Fitzroy in the Round 7 game played on 16 June 1906.

=== Williamstown (VFA) ===
In July 1906 Bliss transferred to Williamstown, where he played until 1909. He played 20 games and kicked 8 goals for Williamstown in 1906 and 1907 and played one further game in 1909 in round 12 at Port Melbourne when the team was short of numbers. During the 1909 season he ceased playing senior level football and captained Yarraville in the Victorian Junior Association. before retiring in 1910.

In 1911 Bliss returned to Williamstown and successfully stood for the committee, and was appointed an honorary trainer of the Williamstown club the same year.

== Death ==
Bliss died in Deniliquin in 1935 as a result of injuries sustained in a motor vehicle accident, and is buried in Williamstown Cemetery.
