= Frank O'Connor (Australian rules footballer) =

Australian rules footballer

Personal information
- Full name: Francis Cecil O'Connor
- Born: 6 November 1923; Newport, Victoria
- Died: 13 November 2017 (aged 94); Boronia, Victoria
- Original team: Prahran
- Height: 170 cm (5 ft 7 in)
- Weight: 68 kg (150 lb)

Playing career^{1}
Years	Club	Games (Goals)
1947–48	Melbourne	24 (29)
- ^{1} Playing statistics correct to the end of 1948.

Frank O'Connor (6 November 1923 – 13 November 2017) was an Australian rules footballer who played with Melbourne in the Victorian Football League (VFL).

O'Connor previously served in the Australian Army during World War II.
