= Williamstown North =

Williamstown North Melbourne, Victoria
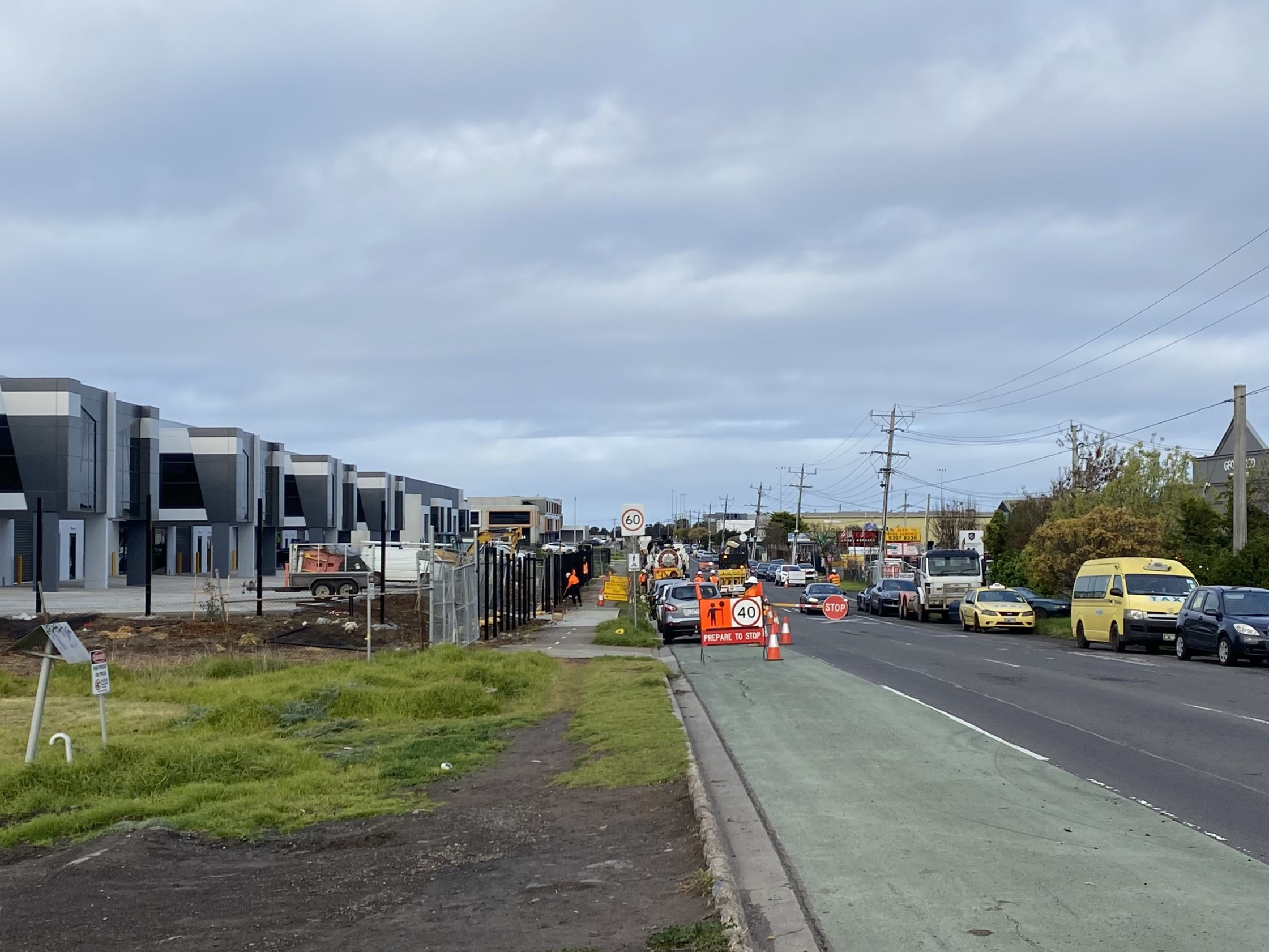
- Williamstown North Industrial Precinct

- Coordinates: 37°51′18″S 144°53′46″E
- Population: 1,622 (2021 census)
  - Density: 901/km^{2} (2,330/sq mi)
- Postcode(s): 3016
- Elevation: 5 m (16 ft)
- Area: 1.8 km^{2} (0.7 sq mi)
- Location: 11 km (7 mi) from Melbourne
- LGA(s): City of Hobsons Bay
- State electorate(s): Williamstown
- Federal division(s): Gellibrand
Suburbs around Williamstown North:
Altona North	Newport	Newport
Altona North	Williamstown North	Williamstown
Altona	Williamstown	Williamstown

Williamstown North is a suburb in Melbourne, Victoria, Australia, 11 km (6.8 mi) south-west of Melbourne's Central Business District, located within the City of Hobsons Bay local government area. Williamstown North recorded a population of 1,622 at the 2021 census.

The suburb is bounded to the north by the Warrnambool railway line, to the west by the Altona branch of the Werribee railway line, to the east by Champion Road, and to the south by Kororoit Creek Road. A large part of the suburb comprises the Williamstown North Industrial Precinct.

Williamstown North is home to the Newport Railway Museum in Champion Road, on the south-east corner of the Newport Workshops. It is a short walk from the North Williamstown railway station. The Museum features the largest collection of Victorian Railways steam locomotives. Other exhibits include electric and diesel locomotives, suburban and country passenger carriages, guards vans, a selection of freight wagons and numerous railway artefacts.

== History ==
Williamstown Cemetery was established in 1857.

Williamstown North Post Office opened on 1 April 1878 and closed in 1980.

== See also ==
- City of Williamstown – Williamstown North was previously within this former local government area.
