= Williamstown Cemetery =

Cemetery in Williamstown North, Victoria, Australia

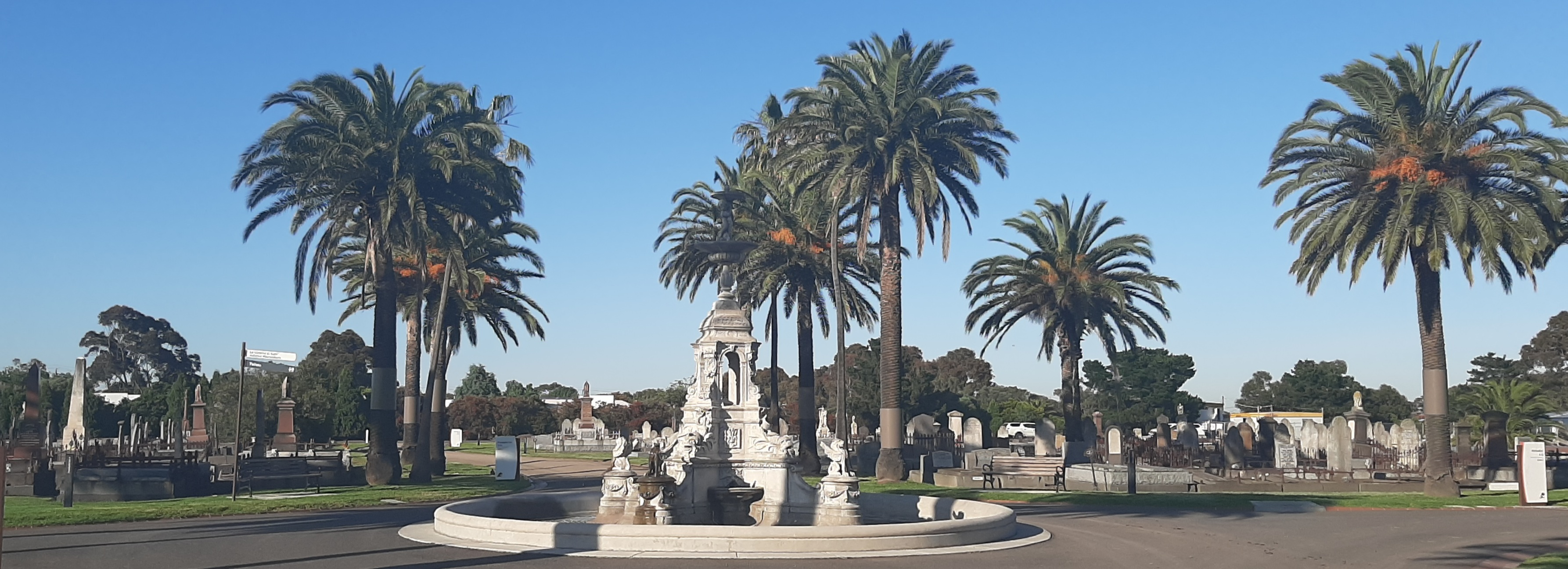
- Interactive map of Williamstown Cemetery

Details
- Established: 1858
- Location: Williamstown North, Victoria
- Country: Australia
- Coordinates: 37.8530°S 144.8808°E
- Owned by: Greater Metropolitan Cemeteries Trust
- Website: Official website
- Find a Grave: Williamstown Cemetery

Williamstown Cemetery is located in the Melbourne suburb of Williamstown North, Victoria, Australia. The main entrance is on Champion Road, Williamstown North. The Cemetery is managed by Greater Metropolitan Cemeteries Trust (GMCT). Williamstown Cemetery is on the Victorian Heritage Register.

== History ==
The cemetery contains re-interred remains from the Point Gellibrand Cemetery.

Williamstown Cemetery was established in 1858 and the first burial was of Captain Lawrence Lawson, a Master Mariner.

In March 2010, the Fawkner Memorial Park Trust was amalgamated with 7 other Trusts and formed the Greater Metropolitan Cemeteries Trust (GMCT) which now manages the Williamstown Cemetery and 18 other sites.

== Notable Burials ==
- Dick Bliss, Australian rules footballer
- Robert L. J. Ellery, government astronomer
- Reginald Sturgess, artist

== War graves ==
The cemetery contains the war graves of 61 Commonwealth service personnel 32 of World War I and 29 of World War II.
