= Harry Dern =

Australian rules footballer

Personal information
- Full name: Harry Dern
- Born: 10 May 1929; Newport, Victoria
- Died: 24 January 2009 (aged 79)
- Original team: Spotswood
- Height: 183 cm (6 ft 0 in)
- Weight: 84 kg (185 lb)
- Position: Midfielder

Playing career^{1}
Years	Club	Games (Goals)
1950–53	Carlton	19 (0)
- ^{1} Playing statistics correct to the end of 1953.

Harry Dern (10 May 1929 – 24 January 2009) was an Australian rules footballer who played with Carlton in the Victorian Football League (VFL).
