= Stan Whight =

Australian rules footballer, born 1907

Personal information
- Full name: Stanley Gordon Whight
- Born: 2 May 1907; Newport, Victoria
- Died: 21 January 1977 (aged 69); Fitzroy, Victoria
- Original team: Yarraville

Playing career^{1}
Years	Club	Games (Goals)
1927	Footscray	4 (0)
- ^{1} Playing statistics correct to the end of 1927.

Stanley Gordon Whight (2 May 1907 – 21 January 1977) was a former Australian rules footballer who played with Footscray in the Victorian Football League (VFL).
