= Bob Addison =

Australian rules footballer, born 1908

Personal information
- Full name: Robert Newman Addison
- Born: 18 July 1908; Newport, Victoria
- Died: 8 March 1988 (aged 79); Footscray, Victoria
- Height: 157 cm (5 ft 2 in)
- Weight: 65 kg (143 lb)

Playing career^{1}
Years	Club	Games (Goals)
1931	Footscray	1 (0)
- ^{1} Playing statistics correct to the end of 1931.

Robert Newman Addison (18 July 1908 – 8 March 1988) was an Australian rules footballer who played one game for the Footscray Football Club in the Victorian Football League (VFL) in 1931.

== Family ==
The son of Robert Addison (1883-1954), and Elizabeth Jane Addison (1890-1976), née Bridges, Robert Newman Addison was born at Newport, Victoria on 18 July 1908.

He married Alice Evelyn Johnson (1918-1999) in 1938.

== Football ==
His solitary game came against Hawthorn in round 1. He did not kick a goal.

After playing for Spotswood in 1932, Addison crossed to Williamstown in the VFA in 1933 and played 27 games and kicked 33 goals. He was leading goalscorer at Williamstown in 1933 with a total of 23.

He was cleared to the South Bendigo Football Club in the Bendigo Football League in 1934.

== Death ==
He died at Footscray, Victoria on 8 March 1988.
