= 1990 VFA Grand Final =

Australian rules football match

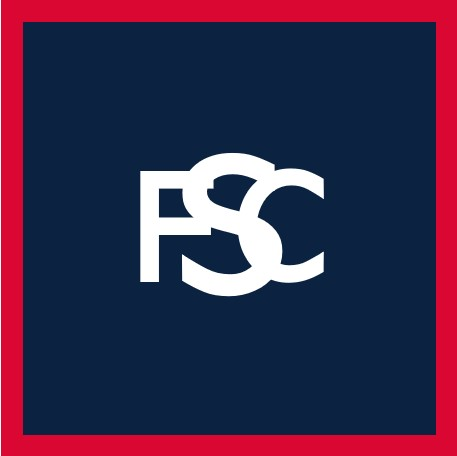

Springvale	Williamstown
15.15 (105)	16.11 (107)
	1	2	3	4
SPR	2.5 (17)	8.11 (59)	13.15 (93)	15.15 (105)
WIL	5.4 (34)	6.4 (40)	10.5 (65)	16.11 (107)
- Date: 30 September 1990
- Ground: Princes Park
- Attendance: 18,634
- Favourite: Springvale
- Umpires: B. Bulluss, J. Russo
- Coin toss won by: Williamstown
- Kicked toward: Heatley Stand end

Ceremonies
- National anthem: Dandenong Marching Band

Accolades
- Norm Goss Medallist: Barry Round (Williamstown)

Broadcast in Australia
- Network: ABC Victoria
- Commentators: Phil Cleary, Peter Gee, Sam Kekovich

The 1990 VFA Grand Final was an Australian rules football match contested between the Springvale Football Club and the Williamstown Football Club at Princes Park on 30 September 1990. It was the 86th grand final of the Victorian Football Association (VFA), held to determine the premiers of the 1990 VFA season.

Williamstown won the match by two points after coming from behind in the final quarter. It is considered one of the most memorable matches in VFA history; and in 2008, it was named it as one of Australian rules football's 150 greatest moments.

== Background ==
=== 1990 season ===
Springvale finished the 1990 home-and-away season in second place on the ladder (only two points behind minor premiers Preston), while Williamstown finished fourth. The teams played each other twice during the season; Williamstown defeated Springvale by 64 points in round 2, before Springvale won by eight points in round 15.

=== Scheduling ===
The grand final was originally to be held scheduled for Sunday, 23 September. This was intended to be a vacant day in the Australian Football League (AFL) finals fixture, meaning that the VFL grand final was to be the premier football event in Melbourne on the day.

However, these plans were disrupted on 8 September, when the AFL qualifying final between Collingwood and West Coast was drawn, forcing it to be replayed on 15 September. As a result of the adjusted AFL finals fixture, the VFA grand final was now scheduled to clash with the AFL second semi-final. To overcome this, the VFA pushed the date of the grand final back to Sunday, 30 September.

Springvale was unhappy with the schedule change, because it meant that it now faced a three-week break between its second semi-final victory on 9 September and the grand final on 30 September, which risking upsetting its form.

To try to overcome the handicap, Springvale played a practice match on 23 September against Carlton's reserves team, which was also forced to endure a three-week break following adjustments made to the AFL reserves finals fixture on account of the draw in the seniors. Williamstown, which qualified after defeating Preston in the preliminary final on 16 September, faced a two-week break before the grand final.

== Match summary ==
After Williamstown led by 17 points at quarter-time, Springvale dominated the second quarter to take a 19-point lead at half-time, at three-quarter time, Springvale led by 28 points, and it kicked the first goal of the final quarter to lead by 34 points. From that point, Williamstown kicked 6.6 (42) to 1.0 (6) to recover and win the game by two points.

Veteran and dual-Liston Trophy winner Bill Swan kicked the winning goal for Williamstown at the 29-minute mark of the final quarter. Swan was not known for his long kicking, and most observers, including Swan, thought that the fifty-metre set shot was well beyond his range. Williamstown held on for the remaining fifty seconds of the match to win by two points.

Springvale coach Phil Maylin said after the game that he thought the three-week break had contributed to his team's slow finish.

Williamstown's Barry Round was awarded the Norm Goss Memorial Medal as best on ground. His medal was sold for A$2,000 in 2025, three years after his death.

=== Scorecard ===
1990 VFA Grand Final
Sunday, 30 September	Springvale	def. by	Williamstown	Princes Park (crowd: 18,634)
2.5 (17); 8.11 (59); 13.15 (93); 15.15 (105)	Q1; Q2; Q3; Final	5.4 (34); 6.4 (40); 10.5 (65); 16.11 (107)	Umpires: B. Bulluss, J. Russo; Norm Goss Memorial Medal: Barry Round (Williamstown)
Robinson 4, Maloni 3, Dempster 2, Dudley 2, Phillips 2, Jeffs, Maylin	Goals	Rickman 4, Johansen 3, Minett 3, Aziz, Gould, Muschialli, O'Connor, Smith, Swan
Meade (concussion); Phillips (unspecified)	Injuries

== Teams ==
Springvale
B:	Meade	Smil	Jeffs
HB:	C. Dwyer	Stuart Nicol	Scott Peacock
C:		Phil Maylin	
HF:	Craig Phillips	Graham Dempster	Paul Dudley
F:	Prosser	Keith Robinson	Peter Maloni
Foll:	S. Clark	Koop	Atkins
Int:	Anderson	Mende	
Coach:	Phil Maylin		
Emg:	Geoff Clarke	King	

Williamstown
B:	Troy Mitchell	Simon Lloyd	Anthony Pastore
HB:	Brett McTaggart	Andrew Howlett	Brett Gould
C:		Chris Burton	
HF:	Wayne Muschialli	Jack Aziz	Rick Slevison
F:	Steven Johansen	Ian Rickman	Bruce Mourney
Foll:	Barry Round	Grant Smith	Marcus O'Connor
Int:	Bill Swan	Greg Minett	
Coach:	Barry Round		
Emg:	David Whillas	Miles	

== See also ==
- List of VFA/VFL premiers
