= Rhoden (surname) =

Rhoden is a surname. Notable people with the surname include:

- Christian Rhoden (born 1974), German high jumper
- Dwight Rhoden, American choreographer
- George Rhoden (born 1926), Jamaican athlete
- Hermann Rhodén (born 1993), Norwegian footballer
- Jared Rhoden (born 1999), American basketball player
- John Rhoden (1918–2001), American sculptor
- Larry Rhoden (born 1959), American politician
- Phil Rhoden (born 1945), Australian rules footballer
- Philip Rhoden (1914–2003), Australian army officer
- Richanda Rhoden (1917-2016), Native-American painter
- Rick Rhoden (born 1953), American golfer and former baseball player
- Rudolf Klein-Rhoden (1871–1936), German actor
- Shawn Rhoden (1975–2021), Jamaican-born American bodybuilder
- Wayne Rhoden, Jamaican singer
- William C. Rhoden, American sports journalist
