= Gardiner Medal =

The Gardiner Medal was an Australian rules football award, formerly awarded to the best and fairest player in the AFL reserves competition.

Officially named the Seconds prior to 1959 and the Reserves from 1959 onwards, the competition ran from 1919 until 1999 and the medal was first awarded in 1926.

The Medal was named in honour of Frank Gardiner, a former president of the VFL Seconds.

The award was voted for by the field umpires at the conclusion of each match in the same format as used in the senior grade's Brownlow Medal.

As for the Brownlow Medal, ties were originally decided on a countback of who received the most "best-on-ground" votes. In 1992 three players who had previously been eliminated on a countback were awarded medals retrospectively for seasons 1950, 1970 and 1971.

== Winners ==
- 1999 – Daniel Healy (St Kilda)
- 1998 – Simon Arnott (Sydney)
- 1997 – Brad Lloyd (Hawthorn)
- 1996 – Trent Nichols (North Melbourne)
- 1995 – Simon Crawshay (Hawthorn)
- 1994 – David Bain (Fitzroy)
- 1993 – Rod Keogh (Melbourne)
- 1992 – Mick Dwyer (St Kilda)
- 1991 – Stephen Anderson (Collingwood)
- 1990 – Rod Keogh (Melbourne)
- 1989 – Michael Kol (Geelong)
- 1988 – Tony Liberatore (Footscray)
- 1987 – Brad Gotch (St Kilda)
- 1986 – Tony Liberatore (Footscray)
- 1985 – James Bennett (Hawthorn), Greg Dear (Hawthorn)
- 1984 – Jim Stephenson (Footscray)
- 1983 – John Taylor (Footscray)
- 1982 – Roger Merrett (Essendon)
- 1981 – Malcolm Reed (Geelong), Daryl Vernon (Richmond)
- 1980 – Bill Valli (Essendon)
- 1979 – Colin Boyd (Essendon)
- 1978 – Alan Goad (Hawthorn)
- 1977 – Daryl Schimmelbusch (North Melbourne)
- 1976 – Alan Mangels (Carlton)
- 1975 – Neil Chamberlain (Melbourne)
- 1974 – Stephen Clifford (Collingwood)
- 1973 – Vin Catoggio (Carlton)
- 1972 – Mike Pokrovsky (Footscray)
- 1971 – Bruce Brown (Melbourne), Bob Heard (Collingwood)
- 1970 – Paul Callery (Melbourne), Michael Redenbach (North Melbourne)
- 1969 – Ken Emselle (Melbourne)
- 1968 – Phil Rhoden (Melbourne)
- 1967 – Ricky Graham (Geelong)
- 1966 – Darryl Herrod (Geelong)
- 1965 – Kevin Jackman (Footscray)
- 1964 – Gary Arnold (Richmond)
- 1963 – Wally Clark (Fitzroy)
- 1962 – Jim Gutterson (Footscray)
- 1961 – Jock O'Brien (North Melbourne)
- 1960 – Neil Trezise (Geelong)
- 1959 – Bill Shelton (Hawthorn)
- 1958 – John Fisher (Hawthorn)
- 1957 – Les Pridham (Essendon)
- 1956 – Graham Kerr (Melbourne)
- 1955 – Doug Davies (Geelong)
- 1954 – Neil Pearson (Hawthorn)
- 1953 – Col Austen (Richmond)
- 1952 – Leo O'Halloran (Geelong)
- 1951 – Neil Doolan (North Melbourne)
- 1950 – Doug Davies (Geelong), Jack O'Halloran (Essendon)
- 1949 – Kevin Coghlan (Collingwood)
- 1948 – Joe Ryan (Footscray)
- 1947 – Pat Twomey (Collingwood)
- 1946 – J. McLeod (Footscray)
- 1945 – Harold Arthur (North Melbourne)
- 1944 – Dick Wearmouth (Footscray)
- 1943 – Ernie Hart (Melbourne)
- 1942 – K. Taylor (St Kilda)
- 1941 – Pat McNamara (South Melbourne)
- 1940 – Mick Price (Carlton)
- 1939 – Noel Smith (Essendon)
- 1938 – Bruce Calverley (Fitzroy)
- 1937 – Alec Peak (St Kilda)
- 1936 – Marcus Boyall (Collingwood)
- 1935 – Joe Kinnear (Melbourne)
- 1934 – Richie Saunders (Richmond)
- 1933 – Ern Utting (Hawthorn)
- 1932 – A. Logan (Hawthorn)
- 1931 – George Franke (North Melbourne)
- 1930 – Selwyn Baker (Richmond), Max Kelly (Geelong)
- 1929 – Bob Ross (Collingwood)
- 1928 – Norman Driver (Melbourne), Jim Money (Geelong)
- 1927 – Sam Jamison (Richmond)
- 1926 – Alby Jacobsen (South Melbourne), R. James (Essendon)
