= Colin Boyd =

Colin Boyd may refer to:

- Colin Boyd, Baron Boyd of Duncansby (born 1953), Scottish judge
- Colin Boyd (footballer) (born 1954), former Australian rules footballer
