= Max Kelly (footballer) =

Australian rules footballer

Personal information
- Full name: Sydney Max Kelly
- Born: 27 November 1909
- Died: 22 March 1987 (aged 77)
- Original team: Geelong West
- Height: 170 cm (5 ft 7 in)
- Weight: 63 kg (139 lb)

Playing career^{1}
Years	Club	Games (Goals)
1931–1933	Geelong	21 (1)
- ^{1} Playing statistics correct to the end of 1933.

Sydney Max Kelly (27 November 1909 – 22 March 1987) was an Australian rules footballer who played with Geelong in the Victorian Football League (VFL).

Kelly, who lived locally in Geelong West, performed well in the 1930 VFL seconds season. He was joint winner of the Gardiner Medal, with Richmond's Selwyn Baker and was on a wing in Geelong's premiership team. That earned him promotion to the senior team in 1931 and he made eight appearances that season, all in wins. He didn't feature in a senior game in 1932 but played 13 games in 1933.

Kelly left Geelong and played for both North Melbourne and Carlton second eighteens. He was instrumental in setting up the Geelong Past Players Association, and was a team selector in the 1950s. He was awarded life membership of the Geelong Football Club in 1950.
