= 2011 Foxtel Cup =

2011 premiership season
- Teams: 16
- Premiers: Williamstown

The 2011 Foxtel Cup was the inaugural season of the Australian rules football club knockout cup competition involving clubs from the various state league competitions from around Australia. The first year of the competition also included the AFL's newest expansion side Greater Western Sydney Giants.

Its purpose was to support and promote the second-tier Australian rules football competitions and to provide another way of developing the lower-tier AFL players. It was originally designed to be a one-off, but due to a significant amount of public interest the AFL said the competition would continue for at least the next five years.

The competition began on 26 March 2011 and ran through to August. Matches were played as curtain-raisers to AFL Saturday night games and were screened on Fox Sports in a late-afternoon slot between afternoon and night AFL matches. $40,000 of prize money was awarded to eventual winners, Williamstown Football Club.

The AFL originally invited the three highest ranked teams from the South Australian National Football League, the Victorian Football League and the West Australian Football League; the top two teams from the Queensland Australian Football League; and the top team from AFL Sydney and the Tasmanian Football League. The Northern Territory Football Club and Greater Western Sydney Giants received special invitations.

However, despite the SANFL on 9 December 2010 signing on to be part of the Cup competition, opposition to the proposal came from its top three clubs Central District, Norwood and Woodville-West Torrens. The three clubs were given until 14 December 2010 to reconsider with the SANFL willing to extend invitations to its next best teams from 2010 if its top three clubs refused to participate. After the top five SANFL clubs released a joint statement on 15 December 2010 declining the invitation to participate in the Cup competition, citing lack of prize money, sponsorship conflicts, salary cap implications, schedule concerns and removing the focus from their SANFL premiership ambitions, their places were taken up by fellow SANFL clubs West Adelaide, North Adelaide and Port Adelaide Magpies.

The AFL gave the Cup competition the go ahead on 17 December 2010 with the fixture released publicly. The official name of the tournament (Foxtel Cup), finalised fixture and participating teams were formalised on 9 February 2011 by the AFL.

Williamstown became the inaugural Foxtel Cup champions when they defeated Claremont by 21 points in the Grand Final at Patersons Stadium on 6 August 2011. Williamstown midfielder Ben Jolley won the Coles Medal as best afield for his game-high 30 possessions and eight clearances.

== 2011 season ==
=== Participating clubs ===
NEAFL Eastern Conference (2)

- Ainslie
- Greater Western Sydney

NEAFL Eastern Conference (3)

- Labrador
- Morningside
- Northern Territory

SANFL (3)

- North Adelaide
- Port Adelaide Magpies
- West Adelaide
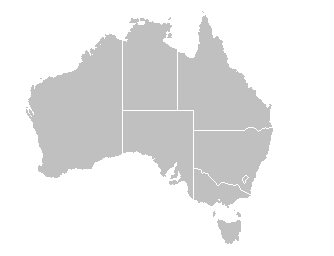

Sydney AFL (1)

- East Coast Eagles

TFL (1)

- Clarence

VFL (3)

- North Ballarat
- Northern Bullants
- Williamstown

WAFL (3)

- Claremont
- East Perth
- Swan Districts

=== Club details ===
Guernsey	Club	Nickname	Location	Qualified as
	Ainslie Football Club	Tri- Colours	Ainslie, ACT	AFL Canberra premiers 2010
	Claremont Football Club	Tigers	Claremont, Western Australia	West Australian Football League runners-up 2010
	Clarence Football Club	Kangaroos	Clarence, Tasmania	Tasmanian Football League premiers 2010
	East Coast Eagles Australian Football Club	Eagles	Rouse Hill, NSW	Sydney AFL premiers 2010
	East Perth Football Club	Royals	Leederville, Western Australia	West Australian Football League; 3rd place 2010
	Greater Western Sydney Giants	Giants	Blacktown, NSW	Australian Football League; Expansion club
	Labrador Australian Football Club	Tigers	Labrador, Queensland	Queensland Australian Football League runners-up 2010
	Morningside Australian Football Club	Panthers	Hawthorne, Queensland	Queensland Australian Football League premiers 2010
	North Adelaide Football Club	Roosters	Prospect, South Australia	South Australian National Football League; 7th place, 2010; SA invitee
	North Ballarat Football Club	Roosters	Ballarat, Victoria	Victorian Football League premiers 2010
	Northern Bullants Football Club	Bullants	Preston, Victoria	Victorian Football League runners-up 2010
	Northern Territory Football Club	Thunder	Darwin, Northern Territory	Queensland Australian Football League; 5th place 2010; NT representative
	Port Adelaide Football Club (SANFL)	Magpies	Alberton, South Australia	South Australian National Football League; 8th place 2010; SA invitee
	Swan Districts Football Club	Swans	Bassendean, Western Australia	West Australian Football League premiers 2010
	West Adelaide Football Club	Bloods	Richmond, South Australia	South Australian National Football League; 6th place 2010; SA invitee
	Williamstown Football Club	Seagulls	Williamstown, Victoria	Victorian Football League; 3rd place 2010

== Stadiums ==
Adelaide	Adelaide	Darwin
AAMI Stadium; Capacity: 51,224	Adelaide Oval; Capacity: 36,000	TIO Stadium; Capacity: 15,000
Gold Coast	Hobart	Melbourne
Metricon Stadium; Capacity: 25,000	Bellerive Oval; Capacity: 16,200	Etihad Stadium; Capacity: 56,347
Melbourne	Perth	Sydney
Melbourne Cricket Ground; Capacity: 100,018	Patersons Stadium; Capacity: 43,500	Sydney Cricket Ground; Capacity: 46,000

== Fixtures ==
=== Bracket ===
First round
Morningside	9	7	61
NT Thunder	12	4	76
East Perth	9	9	63
North Ballarat	9	7	61
Swan Districts	2	6	18
Williamstown	8	7	55
West Adelaide	15	10	100
Ainslie	3	5	23
Clarence	4	7	31
Claremont	14	18	102
Northern Bullants	19	9	123
Greater Western Sydney	5	4	34
East Coast	2	3	15
Port Adelaide	16	11	107
North Adelaide	16	11	107
Labrador	3	4	22

Quarter-finals
NT Thunder	10	11	71
East Perth	12	5	77
Williamstown	15	6	96
West Adelaide	12	5	77
Claremont	13	12	90
Northern Bullants	7	2	44
Port Adelaide	9	6	60
North Adelaide	6	8	44

Semi-finals
East Perth	4	8	32
Williamstown	16	7	103
Claremont	11	7	73
Port Adelaide	8	9	57

Final
Williamstown	9	5	59
Claremont	5	8	38

=== Round of 16 ===
Game #1 (AFL Rd 1) 26 March 2011; 15:05 EST	Morningside	61–76 curtain raiser to Adelaide v Hawthorn	Northern Territory Thunder	AAMI Stadium, Adelaide match report
	2.0 (12); 4.1 (25); 6.4 (40); 9.7 (61)	match report	3.2 (20); 7.3 (45); 8.4 (52); 12.4 (76)
		Goals
	Shaun Mugavin 4, Austin Lucy 2, Joshua Brown 1, Aaron Rogers 1, Jake Thomlinson 1		Ross Tungatulum 4, Andrew McLeod 3, Jed Anderson 1, Cameron Ilett 1, Nyaburu Kelly 1, Matthew Rosier 1, Josh Watson 1
		Bests
	Nathan Kinch, Shaun Mugavin, Austin Lucy, Damien Bonnie, Jake Thomlinson		Andrew McLeod, Ross Tungatalum, Shaun Tapp, Jed Anderson, Matthew Rosier

Game #2 (AFL Rd 2) 2 April 2011; 14:35 WST	East Perth	63–61 curtain raiser to Fremantle v Geelong	North Ballarat	Patersons Stadium, Perth match report
	2.2 (14); 4.3 (27); 6.6 (42); 9.9 (63)	match report	2.2 (14); 6.3 (39); 7.5 (47); 9.7 (61)
		Goals
	Moss 3, Seal, Polak 2, Clutterbuck 1, Prior 1		Micallef 3, George 2, Linke 1, McKenzie 1, Stephenson 1, Walker 1
		Bests
	Patrick Travers, Benjamin Clarke, Brendan Lee, Aaron Sweet, Matthew Seal, Garry Moss		Myles Sewell, Orren Stephenson, Zacc Struth, Derick Micallef

Game #3 (AFL Rd 3) 9 April 2011; 15:05 WST	Swan Districts	18–55 curtain raiser to West Coast Eagles v Sydney Swans	Williamstown	Patersons Stadium, Perth match report
	0.2 (2); 0.4 (4); 0.6 (6); 2.6 (18)	match report	0.1 (1); 4.3 (27); 6.4 (40); 8.7 (55)
		Goals
	Geappen 1, Wolfenden 1		Jones 2, Veszpremi 2, Dahlhaus 2, Hooper, Hahn
		Bests
	Pearce, Roach, Miles, Hams, Davis		Minson, Djerrkura, Schofield, Johnson, Jolley, Veszpremi

Game #4 (AFL Rd 4) 16 April 2011; 16:05 CST	West Adelaide	100–23 curtain raiser to Port Adelaide v Adelaide	Ainslie	AAMI Stadium, Adelaide match report
	3.2 (20); 8.5 (53); 11.6 (72); 15.10 (100)	match report	0.2 (2); 1.2 (8); 3.4 (22); 3.5 (23)
		Goals
	Fielke 5, N.Caruso 2, Webb 2, Agars, Borholm, Davenport, Eagle, Moran, Rankine		Bowles, Crook, Hughes
		Bests
	Davenport, Fielke, N.Caruso, Birss, Moran, Fisher		I.Lawless, Hughes, Crook, M.Lawless

Game #5 (AFL Rd 5) 23 April 2011; 19:35 EST	Clarence	31–102 stand alone game	Claremont	Bellerive Oval, Hobart match report
	0.2 (2); 2.5 (17); 4.7 (31); 4.7 (31)	match report	2.5 (17); 5.8 (38); 10.13 (73); 14.18 (102)
		Goals
	Standen 2, Thurley, Boon		Saunders 3, Foster 2, Lee 2, Orzel 2, Derickx, McLernon, Rowe, Wilkes, Willett
		Bests
	Thurley, O’Brien, Round, Standen		Murphy, Handley, Rowe, Wilkes

Game #6 (AFL Rd 6) 30 April 2011; 16:05 EST	Northern Bullants	123–34 curtain raiser to Richmond v Brisbane Lions	Greater Western Sydney	Melbourne Cricket Ground match report
	8.1 (49); 12.4 (76); 14.7 (91); 19.9 (123)	match report	0.0 (0); 0.3 (3); 4.4 (28); 5.4 (34)
		Goals
	Thornton 6, Arrowsmith 4, Saad 3, Henderson 2, Kerr, Meese, O’Keeffe, Watson		Giles 2, Tunbridge 2, Casley
		Bests
	Thornton, McLean, Cachia, Gianfagna, McCorkell, Watson		Miles, Shiel, Giles, Hampton, Clifton

Game #7 (AFL Rd 8) 14 May 2011; 16:45 EST	East Coast Eagles	15–107 curtain raiser to Sydney Swans v Port Adelaide	Port Adelaide	Sydney Cricket Ground match report
	0.1 (1); 1.2 (8); 2.2 (14); 2.3 (15)	match report	3.5 (23); 6.7 (43); 12.8 (80); 16.11 (107)
		Goals
	S.O'Connor 2		J.Meiklejohn 4, I.Maric 3, D.Kulikowski 2, J.Surgan 2, J.Butcher, S.Gray, L.Harder, J.Hoskin, Z.Kirkwood
		Bests
	O’Connor, Vlatko, Baker		Meiklejohn, Kirkwood, Maric, Surjan, Erskine, Banner

Game #8 (AFL Rd 9) 21 May 2011; 17:05 CST	North Adelaide	107–22 match played POST; Port Adelaide v Fremantle	Labrador	AAMI Stadium, Adelaide match report
	4.2; 7.5; 11.7; 16.11 (107)	match report	1.3; 2.3; 3.4; 3.4 (22)
		Goals
	Alleway 6, Gill 3, Thring 2, Armstrong, Backwell, Bennett, Connors, Teasdale		Clarke, Grayson, White
		Bests
	Backwell, Gill, Alleway, Bennett, Thiele, Ryswyk, Thompson		Jones, Featherstone, Grayson, Clarke

=== Quarter-finals ===
QF #1 (AFL Rd 10) 28 May 2011; 5:15 pm CST	NT Thunder	71–77 curtain raiser to Richmond v Port Adelaide	East Perth	TIO Stadium, Darwin match report
	2.2 (14); 3.5 (23); 6.6 (42); 10.11 (71)	match report	3.2 (20); 6.3 (39); 11.4 (70); 12.5 (77)
		Goals
	Tungatalum 3, Cox 2, C. Ilett 2, McLeod 2, Ewing		Pettifer 4, Smith 3, Delborello 2, Swan 2, Seal
		Bests
	McLeod, Maher, Rosier, Tungatalum, J. Ilett		Travers, Lee, Pettifer, Clarke, Smith, Moss

QF #2 (AFL Rd 11) 4 June 2011; 5:15 pm CST	West Adelaide	77–96 stand alone game	Williamstown	AAMI Stadium, Adelaide match report
	2.2 (14); 3.3 (21); 6.4 (40); 12.5 (77)	match report	3.0 (20); 9.2 (56); 12.2 (74); 15.6 (96)
		Goals
	Beech 5, F. Caruso 2, Agars, N. Caruso, Ezard, Macreadie, Webb		Skinner 3, Hooper 2, Panos 2, Tutt 2, Veszpremi 2, Davies, Gilbee, Roughead, Woods
		Bests
	Beech, Davenport, Macreadie, Caire, F. Caruso		Jolley, Hudson, Dahlhaus, Davies, Hooper, Veszpremi, Tutt

QF #3 (AFL Rd 12) 11 June 2011; 4:05 pm EST	Claremont	90–44 curtain raiser to Gold Coast v North Melbourne	Northern Bullants	Metricon Stadium, Gold Coast match report
	4.3 (27); 10.6 (66); 12.8 (80); 13.12 (90)	match report	1.0 (6); 3.1 (19); 5.2 (32); 7.2 (44)
		Goals
	Lee 3, Schammer 2, Wilkes 2, Brabazon, Broome, Handley, McLernon, Orzel, Richardson		Arrowsmith, Houlihan, Kerr, Marcon, Saad, Twomey, Warnock
		Bests
	Blackwell, Mitchell, Orzel, Stevenson, Schammer, Lee, Wilkes		Houlihan, Kerr, Cachia, Arrowsmith, McCorkell, Joseph, Warnock

QF #4 (AFL Rd 13) 18 June 2011; 4:35 pm CST	Port Adelaide	60–44 stand alone game	North Adelaide	Adelaide Oval match report
	3.1 (19); 4.3 (27); 7.4 (46); 9.6 (60)	match report	2.2 (14); 5.3 (33); 6.5 (41); 6.8 (44)
		Goals
	Lokan 4, Harris 2, Banner, Harder, Rose		Boras 3, Backwell, Starke, Young
		Bests
	Banner, Harder, Slattery, Harris, Lokan, Gray		Backwell, Bennett, Thring, Boras, Handby

=== Semi-finals ===
SF #1 (AFL Rd 16) 9 July 2011; 5:05 pm EST	East Perth	32–103 stand alone game	Williamstown	Etihad Stadium, Melbourne match report
	0.2 (2); 1.3 (9); 2.7 (19); 4.8 (32)	match report	6.4 (40); 10.5 (65); 13.5 (83); 16.7 (103)
		Goals
	Smith 2, Shepheard		Veszpremi 4, Cravino 2, Minson 2, Goodes 2 Addison, Johnson, Hahn, Howard, Tutt, Johannisen
		Bests
	Smith, Shepheard, MacCaulay, Chartres, Clutterbuck, Moss, Sweet		Addison, Veszpremi, Liberatore, Minson, Davies, Johnson, Goodes

SF #2 (AFL Rd 17) 16 July 2011; 3:05 pm WST	Claremont	73–57 stand alone game	Port Adelaide	Patersons Stadium, Perth match report
	5.3 (33); 6.4 (40); 10.4 (64); 11.7 (73)	match report	0.2 (2); 2.3 (15); 5.6 (36); 8.9 (57)
		Goals
	A.Hamp 2, C.Jones 2, B.Schammer 2, A.Browne, T.Handley, K.Mitchell, J.Murphy, T.Millet		T.Milera 3, C.Grove, S.Harris, J.Thurgood, J.Young
		Bests
	T.Swift, P.McGinnity, A.Browne, B.Schammer, K.Mitchell		J.Young, T.Milera, J.Butcher, J.Hoskin, J.Surjan, L.Harder

=== Grand final ===
GF (AFL Rd 20) 6 August 2011; 3:05 pm WST	Claremont	38–59 stand alone game	Williamstown	Patersons Stadium, Perth match report
	1.2 (8); 2.2 (14); 5.5 (35); 5.8 (38)	match report	2.1 (13); 4.3 (27); 6.4 (40); 9.5 (59)	Attendance: 1,405
		Goals
	Beau Wilkes 2, Jack Bradshaw, Chad Jones, Gerrick Weedon		Nathan Djerrkura 2, Christian Howard 2, Jordan Roughead 2, Ed Barlow, Andrew Hooper, Jason Tutt
		Bests
	Kane Mitchell, Andrew Foster, Gerrick Weedon, Brett Jones; Lewis Stevenson, Thomas Swift		Ben Jolley, Jordan Roughead, Mitch Wallis, Christian Howard, Nathan Djerrkura 2, Matthew Panos
