= Redenbach =

Redenbach is a surname. Notable people with the surname include:

- Michael Redenbach (disambiguation), multiple people
- Tyler Redenbach (born 1984), Canadian ice hockey player
