= Michael Redenbach =

Michael Redenbach may refer to:

- Michael Redenbach (footballer, born 1949), Australian rules footballer for North Melbourne
- Michael Redenbach (footballer, born 1959), Australian rules footballer for Essendon
