= Gary Arnold =

Australian rules footballer

Personal information
- Full name: Gary E. Arnold
- Born: 5 December 1943 (age 82)
- Original team: Rosebery
- Height: 178 cm (5 ft 10 in)
- Weight: 73 kg (161 lb)

Playing career^{1}
Years	Club	Games (Goals)
1963–1964	Richmond	13 (7)
- ^{1} Playing statistics correct to the end of 1964.

Gary Arnold (born 5 December 1943) is a former Australian rules footballer who played with Richmond in the Victorian Football League (VFL).

Arnold, a Tasmanian, was a rover who came to Richmond from Rosebery. He played nine games in the 1963 VFL season. The following year he made only four appearances, but won the Gardiner Medal for his performances in the reserves.

He spent the 1965 season with the Dandenong Football Club and then joined Claremont in 1966.
