= Doug Davies (Australian footballer) =

Australian rules footballer (1930–1991)

Personal information
- Full name: Douglas John Harding Davies
- Born: 13 October 1930; Geelong, Victoria
- Died: 24 March 1991 (aged 60); Geelong, Victoria
- Original team: Newtown-Chilwell
- Height: 169 cm (5 ft 7 in)
- Weight: 73 kg (161 lb)

Playing career^{1}
Years	Club	Games (Goals)
1948–1950	Geelong	12 (14)
- ^{1} Playing statistics correct to the end of 1950.

Douglas John Harding Davies (13 October 1930 – 24 March 1991) was an Australian rules footballer who played with Geelong in the Victorian Football League (VFL).

Davies was a reserve in Geelong's 1948 seconds premiership team and won a Gardiner Medal in 1950. His appearances in the seniors were limited, after playing eight games in his first season he added just four more over the next two years. A rover, he won another Gardiner Medal in 1955, while captain-coach. This gave him the distinction of being the first player to win the award twice. He then went on to play with Geelong West.
