= Danny Jacobs (footballer) =

Australian rules footballer (born 1980)

Personal information
- Full name: Daniel Jacobs
- Born: 25 June 1980 (age 46)
- Original teams: South Melbourne Districts/ Prahran under-18s
- Draft: No. 36, 1998 national draft
- Debut: Round 14, 1999, Essendon vs. Fremantle, at Melbourne Cricket Ground
- Height: 189 cm (6 ft 2 in)
- Weight: 96 kg (212 lb)
- Position: Defender

Playing career^{1}
Years	Club	Games (Goals)
1999–2003	Essendon	81 (23)
2004–2007	Hawthorn	45 (6)
Total		126 (29)
- ^{1} Playing statistics correct to the end of 2007.

Daniel "Danny" Jacobs (born 25 June 1980) is a former Australian rules football player who played with the Essendon Football Club and Hawthorn Football Club in the Australian Football League.

== Essendon career ==
Jacobs played for Essendon from 1999 to 2003, including the 2001 AFL Grand Final loss to Brisbane. After playing 81 games for Essendon, he was traded to Hawthorn at the end of the 2003 season as part of the Veale Deal that resulted in Jade Rawlings being traded to the Western Bulldogs.

== Hawthorn career ==
After missing only two matches in his last three seasons at Essendon, Jacobs' time at Hawthorn was plagued by injuries to his leg, hand, back, jaw and hip. In March 2008, after playing only 45 games over four years, Jacobs announced his retirement from AFL football because of a degenerative hip problem.

In 2010, Jacobs joined the St Kilda City Football Club (Southern Football League), having crossed over from Port Colts (WRFL).

== Statistics ==
Legend
G	Goals	K	Kicks	D	Disposals	T	Tackles
B	Behinds	H	Handballs	M	Marks

Season	Team	No.	Games	Totals							Averages (per game)							Votes
Season	Team	No.	Games	G	B	K	H	D	M	T	G	B	K	H	D	M	T	Votes
1999	Essendon	42	1	0	0	2	0	2	1	1	0.0	0.0	2.0	0.0	2.0	1.0	1.0	0
2000	Essendon	42	9	3	4	46	37	83	28	17	0.3	0.4	5.1	4.1	9.2	3.1	1.9	0
2001	Essendon	42	23	7	7	172	98	270	96	34	0.3	0.3	7.5	4.3	11.7	4.2	1.5	0
2002	Essendon	21	24	9	9	257	133	390	146	38	0.4	0.4	10.7	5.5	16.3	6.1	1.6	1
2003	Essendon	21	24	4	3	185	138	323	119	39	0.2	0.1	7.7	5.8	13.5	5.0	1.6	0
2004	Hawthorn	8	12	3	1	70	81	151	65	15	0.3	0.1	5.8	6.8	12.6	5.4	1.3	0
2005	Hawthorn	8	15	2	2	124	119	243	105	18	0.1	0.1	8.3	7.9	16.2	7.0	1.2	1
2006	Hawthorn	8	9	0	0	86	69	155	69	12	0.0	0.0	9.6	7.7	17.2	7.7	1.3	0
2007	Hawthorn	8	9	1	0	103	42	145	72	14	0.1	0.0	11.4	4.7	16.1	8.0	1.6	0
Career			126	29	26	1045	717	1762	701	188	0.2	0.2	8.3	5.7	14.0	5.6	1.5	2

== Honours and achievements ==
Team

- 3× Minor premiership (Essendon): 1999, 2000, 2001

Individual

- AFL Rising Star nominee: 2001
