= Jim Gutterson =

Australian rules footballer

Personal information
- Full name: Jim Gutterson
- Born: 1 July 1939
- Died: 18 July 2008 (aged 69)
- Original team: Chelsea
- Height: 183 cm (6 ft 0 in)
- Weight: 91 kg (201 lb)

Playing career^{1}
| Years | Club | Games (Goals) |
| 1961–1962 | Footscray | 7 (0) |
- ^{1} Playing statistics correct to the end of 1962.

Jim Gutterson (1 July 1939 – 18 July 2008) was an Australian rules footballer who played with Footscray in the Victorian Football League (VFL).

Gutterson, a fullback, originally came from Chelsea and made a total of seven appearances for Footscray in the 1961 and 1962 VFL seasons. He won the reserves best and fairest award, the Gardiner Medal, in 1962.

He also played for three Victorian Football Association clubs, Moorabbin, Brighton-Caulfield, and Prahran.
