= Jim Money =

Australian rules footballer, born 1907

Personal information
- Full name: William James Money
- Born: 8 February 1906; Glasgow, Scotland
- Died: 14 January 1989 (aged 81); Geelong, Victoria

Playing career^{1}
Years	Club	Games (Goals)
1928	Geelong	2 (1)
- ^{1} Playing statistics correct to the end of 1928.

William James Money, MBE (8 February 1906 - 14 January 1989) was an Australian rules footballer who played with Geelong in the Victorian Football League (VFL).

Money appeared in just two senior games for Geelong, both in the 1928 VFL season. He played well, however, in the league seconds that year, sharing the Gardiner Medal with Norman Driver of Melbourne.

Money later served in the Australian Army during World War II, spending two years serving in Palestine.

Money was also prominent in the Scouting movement, and was appointed as a Member of the Order of the British Empire in 1979 for his services to Scouting.
