= Steven Greene =

Australian rules footballer

Personal information
- Full name: Steven Greene
- Born: 25 January 1982 (age 44)
- Original team: Sandringham Dragons/Melbourne Grammar
- Draft: 28th, 2000 AFL draft
- Height: 182 cm (6 ft 0 in)
- Weight: 78 kg (172 lb)

Playing career^{1}
Years	Club	Games (Goals)
2001–2005	Hawthorn	42 (11)
- ^{1} Playing statistics correct to the end of 2005.

Steven Greene (born 25 January 1982) is a former Australian rules footballer who played with Hawthorn in the Australian Football League (AFL).

As the son of former leading AFL player Russell Greene, Greene was eligible for both Hawthorn and St Kilda under the father–son rule. He opted for the former and Hawthorn secured him with the 28th selection of the 2000 AFL draft, from TAC Cup side Sandringham Dragons.

Greene, a hard running player, got a regular game late in the 2001 season and received a Rising Star nomination in the final round. He took part in Hawthorn's finals series and had 17 disposals plus two goals in their win over Sydney in the elimination final. Greene finished the season averaging 16 disposals a game.

Unable to hold down a spot in the team over the next few seasons, Greene spent much of his time playing for Victorian Football League (VFL) side Box Hill, winning their "Best and Fairest" in 2005. Greene was delisted by Hawthorn and in 2006 signed with Williamstown. He won the Williamstown "Best and Fairest" award in his first season.

Greene is currently a part owner of Melbourne-based apparel company Jaggad.
