= Ian Pearson (footballer) =

Australian rules footballer

Personal information
- Full name: Ian Victor Pearson
- Born: 9 February 1934 (age 92)
- Original team: Brighton Technical School
- Height: 174 cm (5 ft 9 in)
- Weight: 73 kg (161 lb)

Playing career^{1}
| Years | Club | Games (Goals) |
| 1953–54 | St Kilda | 9 (2) |
| 1956 | Hawthorn | 5 (2) |
| Total | | 14 (4) |
- ^{1} Playing statistics correct to the end of 1956.

Ian Victor Pearson (born 9 February 1934) is a former Australian rules footballer who played with St Kilda and Hawthorn in the Victorian Football League (VFL).

Pearson is the younger brother of Neil Pearson who also played for Hawthorn.
