= Peter Rohde =

Australian rules footballer, born 1964

Personal information
- Full name: Peter Rohde
- Born: 19 November 1964 (age 61)
- Original team: Sandhurst
- Height: 185 cm (6 ft 1 in)
- Weight: 87 kg (192 lb)
- Position: Defender

Playing career^{1}
Years	Club	Games (Goals)
1985–1987	Carlton	46 (6)
1988–1995	Melbourne	117 (22)
Total		162 (28)

Coaching career
Years	Club	Games (W–L–D)
2002–2004	Western Bulldogs	45 (9–35–1)
- ^{1} Playing statistics correct to the end of Round 11, 2009.

Peter Rohde (born 19 November 1964) is a former Australian Football League (AFL) player and coach.

== Playing career ==
=== Carlton ===
Rohde came from the Bendigo region and made his Victorian Football League (VFL) debut for Carlton Football Club in 1985. He played total of 46 games and kicked six goals for the club from 1985 until 1987. Rohde left Carlton at the end of the 1987 season, because the Carlton senior coach Robert Walls had a low opinion of Rohde's playing ability and dropped him from the side during the 1987 finals campaign, when Carlton ended up winning the premiership.

=== Melbourne ===
Rohde transferred to Melbourne Football Club, where he played 117 games and kicked 22 goals from 1988 until he retired in 1995. The Melbourne senior coach John Northey had a high opinion of Rohde's playing ability, but Rohde was plagued by injury.

== Coaching career ==
=== Norwood ===
Rohde achieved success as senior coach of Norwood in the South Australian National Football League, taking the club to a premiership in 1997.

=== Western Bulldogs ===
Rohde became assistant coach at the Western Bulldogs. Towards the end of the 2002 season, the resignation of senior coach Terry Wallace led to Rohde being made caretaker senior coach for the final-round clash with Collingwood at the MCG in Round 22, 2002, which the Bulldogs won. Rohde was then appointed to the position of full-time senior coach. In the 2003 season, the Bulldogs under Rohde struggled and finished 16th, for the wooden spoon with three wins, eighteen losses and one draw. In the 2004 season the Bulldogs under Rohde struggled again and finished 14th with five wins and seventeen losses. Rohde was sacked towards the end of the 2004 season, with four matches to go, but he agreed to stay and coach for the rest of the season. Rohde coached Western Bulldogs in 45 games with nine wins and 35 losses and one draw, a winning percentage of 20 per cent. Rohde was then replaced by Rodney Eade as Western Bulldogs senior coach.

== Administrative career ==
Rohde then went to Port Adelaide Football Club, serving as Football Operations Manager from the end of 2004 until the end of the 2014 season. Rohde was then replaced by Chris Davies as Port Adelaide General Manager of Football Operations.

== Personal life ==
Rohde has three children and is married to Robyn.
