= Neil Chamberlain =

Australian rules footballer

Personal information
- Full name: Neil Chamberlain
- Born: 24 April 1955 (age 71)
- Original team: East Malvern
- Height: 178 cm (5 ft 10 in)
- Weight: 73 kg (161 lb)

Playing career^{1}
Years	Club	Games (Goals)
1973–1976	Melbourne	17 (10)
- ^{1} Playing statistics correct to the end of 1976.

Neil Chamberlain (born 24 April 1955) is a former Australian rules footballer who played with Melbourne in the Victorian Football League (VFL).

Chamberlain, from East Malvern, had his most productive year in 1974, playing nine senior games.

He spent most of his time in the reserves and won the 1975 Gardiner Medal, three votes clear of second placed Gerry Lynn.

After leaving Melbourne he played for Camberwell in the Victorian Football Association.
