= Mike Pokrovsky =

Australian rules footballer

Personal information
- Full name: Michael Pokrovsky
- Born: 2 February 1953 (age 73)
- Original team: St Albans
- Height: 179 cm (5 ft 10 in)
- Weight: 89 kg (196 lb)

Playing career^{1}
Years	Club	Games (Goals)
1970, 1972	Footscray	3 (0)
- ^{1} Playing statistics correct to the end of 1972.

Mike Pokrovsky (born 2 February 1953) is a former Australian rules footballer who played with Footscray in the Victorian Football League (VFL).

Pokrovsky was a defender from St Albans, who played mostly as a back pocket. He won a Gardiner Medal in 1972 but only appeared in three senior games for Footscray. After leaving the club he played with Sunshine.
