= Harold Arthur (footballer) =

Australian rules footballer

Personal information
- Born: 21 September 1916
- Died: 9 March 2006 (aged 89)
- Original team: Sandhurst
- Height: 177 cm (5 ft 10 in)
- Weight: 80 kg (176 lb)

Playing career^{1}
Years	Club	Games (Goals)
1941, 1944–1945	North Melbourne	9 (2)
- ^{1} Playing statistics correct to the end of 1945.

Harold Arthur (21 September 1916 – 9 March 2006) was an Australian rules footballer who played with North Melbourne in the Victorian Football League (VFL).

Arthur, a centreman, made three appearances with North Melbourne in 1941 but then didn't play for the next two years due to the war. He returned to the team in 1944 but was unable to become a regular fixture in the side. In 1945 he won the Gardiner Medal, which was rewarded to the best and fairest player in the league seconds. The following year he began playing for Port Melbourne.

He was the uncle of Hawthorn premiership captain Graham Arthur and the younger brother of Alan Arthur, who played for Essendon.
