= Alan Mangels =

Australian rules footballer (born 1956)

Personal information
- Full name: Alan Mangels
- Born: 29 July 1956 (age 70)
- Original team: Oak Park
- Height: 179 cm (5 ft 10 in)
- Weight: 83 kg (183 lb)

Playing career^{1}
| Years | Club | Games (Goals) |
| 1974–1980 | Carlton | 88 (25) |
| 1981–1983 | Geelong | 13 (6) |
| Total | | 101 (31) |
- ^{1} Playing statistics correct to the end of 1983.

Alan Mangels (born 29 July 1956) is a former Australian rules footballer who played with Carlton and Geelong in the Victorian Football League (VFL).

Mangels was only 10 when he signed with Carlton and progressed through the juniors and Under-19s before making his senior debut in 1974. Despite playing 14 senior games in 1976, he put in enough good performances in the reserves to win the Gardiner Medal. He played finals football for Carlton in 1975 and 1976 but wasn't picked in the 1979 finals series where Carlton won their 12th premiership. In the opening nine rounds of the 1980 VFL season he averaged just under 20 disposals a game, a career high. He was then put up by Carlton for trade, with the club hoping to secure Greg Wells from Melbourne as part of a swap with Mangels. The deal through when Mangels informed the club that his preferred destination was Geelong, which is where he would end up.

He made few senior appearances at Geelong due to ankle and hamstring injuries, although he did participate in their 1981 and 1982 reserves premiership teams.
