= Bruce Brown (footballer) =

Australian rules footballer

Personal information
- Full name: Bruce W. Brown
- Born: 6 October 1951 (age 75)
- Original team: Essex Heights
- Height: 187 cm (6 ft 2 in)
- Weight: 83 kg (183 lb)

Playing career^{1}
| Years | Club | Games (Goals) |
| 1971 | Melbourne | 6 (0) |
| 1972 | Essendon | 1 (0) |
| Total | | 7 (0) |
- ^{1} Playing statistics correct to the end of 1972.

Bruce W. Brown (born 6 October 1951) is a former Australian rules footballer who played with Melbourne Football Club and Essendon Football Club in the Victorian Football League (VFL).

From Essex Heights originally, Brown started his VFL career at Melbourne. He played six senior games for Melbourne in the 1971 VFL season and performed well in the reserves, sharing a Gardiner Medal with Bob Heard of Collingwood.

He spent the 1972 season at Essendon, played for Port Melbourne in 1973, and two years later joined Brunswick.

He is the son of Alf Brown, a football journalist who is a member of the Australian Football Hall of Fame.
