= 2001 AFL Rising Star =

2001 Ansett AFL Rising Star
- Sponsored by: Ansett
- Country: Australia
- Rising Star: Justin Koschitzke (St Kilda)

The Ansett AFL Rising Star award is given annually to a stand out young player in the Australian Football League. The 2001 medal was won by St Kilda player Justin Koschitzke.

== Eligibility ==
Every round, an Australian Football League rising star nomination is given to a stand out young player. To be eligible for the award, a player must be under 21 on 1 January of that year, have played 10 or fewer senior games and not been suspended during the season. At the end of the year, one of the 22 nominees is the winner of award, based on voting by a selected panel of football experts.

== Nominations ==
| Round | Player | Club |
|---|---|---|
| 1 | Damian Cupido | Brisbane Lions |
| 2 | Daniel Harris | North Melbourne |
| 3 | Daniel Kerr | West Coast |
| 4 | Ryan Lonie | Collingwood |
| 5 | Caydn Beetham | St Kilda |
| 6 | Aaron Henneman | Essendon |
| 7 | James Begley | St Kilda |
| 8 | Danny Jacobs | Essendon |
| 9 | Luke Penny | Western Bulldogs |
| 10 | Brett Johnson | Hawthorn |
| 11 | Mark McVeigh | Essendon |
| 12 | Cameron Ling | Geelong |
| 13 | Adam McPhee | Fremantle |
| 14 | Justin Koschitzke | St Kilda |
| 15 | Daniel Giansiracusa | Western Bulldogs |
| 16 | Robert Murphy | Western Bulldogs |
| 17 | Brent Guerra | Port Adelaide |
| 18 | Aaron Fiora | Richmond |
| 19 | Robert Copeland | Brisbane Lions |
| 20 | Corey Enright | Geelong |
| 21 | Dion Woods | Fremantle |
| 22 | Steven Greene | Hawthorn |
Source: AFL Record Season Guide 2015

== Final voting ==
| | Player | Club | Votes |
|---|---|---|---|
| 1 | Justin Koschitzke | St Kilda | 31 |
| 2 | Daniel Kerr | West Coast | 27 |
| 3 | Mark McVeigh | Essendon | 23 |
| 4 | Danny Jacobs | Essendon | 11 |
| 4 | Ryan Lonie | Collingwood | 11 |
| 6 | Adam McPhee | Fremantle | 1 |
| 6 | Robert Murphy | Western Bulldogs | 1 |
Source: AFL Record Season Guide 2015
