= Graham Kerr (footballer) =

Australian rules footballer

Personal information
- Full name: Graham Alexander Kerr
- Born: 6 April 1934
- Died: 23 October 2022 (aged 88)
- Original team: University Blues
- Height: 178 cm (5 ft 10 in)
- Weight: 73 kg (161 lb)

Playing career^{1}
Years	Club	Games (Goals)
1954–1955	Carlton	13 (4)
1956–1957	Melbourne	3 (0)
Total		16 (4)
- ^{1} Playing statistics correct to the end of 1957.

Graham Alexander Kerr (6 April 1934 – 23 October 2022) was a lawyer and an Australian rules footballer who played with Carlton and Melbourne in the Victorian Football League (VFL).

Kerr was a law student at Melbourne University when Hawthorn recruited him from the University Blues. He spent two seasons playing for Carlton and then joined Melbourne. He didn't play a senior game in 1956 but won the Gardiner Medal in the league seconds.
