= John Taylor (Australian footballer) =

Australian rules footballer

Personal information
- Full name: John Taylor
- Born: 21 September 1963 (age 63)
- Original team: Albion
- Height: 194 cm (6 ft 4 in)
- Weight: 92 kg (203 lb)

Playing career^{1}
Years	Club	Games (Goals)
1983	Footscray	2 (2)
- ^{1} Playing statistics correct to the end of 1983.

John Taylor (born 21 September 1963) is a former Australian rules footballer who played with Footscray in the Victorian Football League (VFL).

Recruited from Albion, Taylor played Under-19s football with Footscray. He made just two senior appearances for Footscray, against Geelong at Waverley Park and Collingwood at Western Oval. The ruckman did however impress in the reserves, winning the 1983 Gardiner Medal.
