= Alec Peak =

Australian rules footballer, born 1916

Personal information
- Full name: James Alexander Peak
- Born: 11 November 1916; Armadale, Victoria
- Died: 8 November 1997 (aged 80)
- Original team: Canterbury
- Height: 166 cm (5 ft 5 in)
- Weight: 65 kg (143 lb)

Playing career^{1}
Years	Club	Games (Goals)
1938	St Kilda	5 (0)
- ^{1} Playing statistics correct to the end of 1938.

James Alexander Peak (11 November 1916 – 8 November 1997) was an Australian rules footballer who played with St Kilda in the Victorian Football League (VFL).

Peak was the first St Kilda player to win a Gardiner Medal, taking home the seconds best and fairest award in 1937. He was rewarded with senior selection in 1938 but wasn't retained by St Kilda for the 1939 VFL season.

He later served St Kilda as a committeeman. As a selector, he helped build the team which could break the club's premiership drought in 1966.
