= Neil Pearson (footballer) =

Australian rules footballer and coach

Neil Alan Pearson

Personal information
- Full name: Neil Alan Pearson
- Born: 9 September 1925; Ballarat, Victoria
- Died: 27 April 2011 (aged 85)
- Original team: Brighton Technical School
- Height: 175 cm (5 ft 9 in)
- Weight: 73 kg (161 lb)
- Position: Wingman

Playing career^{1}
Years	Club	Games (Goals)
1945–1954	Hawthorn	133 (44)
- ^{1} Playing statistics correct to the end of 1954.

Career highlights
- Gardiner Medal: 1954

Neil Alan Pearson (9 September 1925 – 27 April 2011) was an Australian rules footballer who played with Hawthorn in the Victorian Football League (VFL).

== Family ==
The son of Leslie John Ramsay Pearson, and May Eleanor Pearson, née Brown, Neil Alan Pearson was born at Ballarat, on 9 September 1925.

His younger brother Ian played at St Kilda and Hawthorn.

== Military service ==
Pearson enlisted three weeks after his eighteenth birthday, serving in Townsville and New Guinea with the Royal Australian Air Force.

== Football ==
Pearson made his debut in the opening round of the 1945 VFL season against Essendon and kicked four goals.

A wingman, he was a solid performer for Hawthorn and brought up his 100th league game in 1952. He represented Victoria at the 1953 Adelaide Carnival, where they went undefeated.

Despite only playing 13 games in the 1953 season, Pearson was Hawthorn's equal leading vote-getter at the Brownlow Medal count that year.

He won a Gardiner Medal in 1954 as playing coach of the reserves but also participated in seven VFL games during the year.

== Honours and achievements ==
Individual

- Gardiner Medal: 1954
- Hawthorn life member
