= Noel Smith (footballer) =

Australian rules footballer, born 1918

Personal information
- Full name: Noel Smith
- Born: 27 November 1918
- Died: 4 September 2008 (aged 89)
- Original team: West Moreland Amateurs
- Height: 183 cm (6 ft 0 in)
- Weight: 78 kg (172 lb)

Playing career^{1}
Years	Club	Games (Goals)
1938, 1943–1945	Essendon	38 (50)
- ^{1} Playing statistics correct to the end of 1945.

Noel Smith (27 November 1918 – 4 September 2008) was an Australian rules footballer who played with Essendon in the Victorian Football League (VFL).

Smith started his career as a full-back but was unable to establish a place for himself in the Essendon side. He performed well in the league seconds, winning a Gardiner Medal in 1939. He didn't make any senior appearances that year and from 1940 to 1942 also wouldn't play a senior game for Essendon, although he did spend some of that time with Brunswick.

His second stint at Essendon, as a forward, was more successful. He played all 20 games for Essendon in the 1944 VFL season, including two finals. His season tally of 40 goals was bettered by only one teammate, Ray Powell, by a mere three goals.

He appeared for Brunswick again from 1946 until 1949 and also played some football in Queensland with Sandgate.
