= Brett Johnson (Australian footballer) =

Australian rules footballer, born 1981

Personal information
- Born: 28 October 1981 (age 45)
- Original team: Swan Districts (WAFL)
- Debut: Round 16, 23 June 2000, Hawthorn vs. Collingwood, at Colonial Stadium

Playing career^{1}
Years	Club	Games (Goals)
2000–2003	Hawthorn	38 (10)
2004–2005	Carlton	32 (9)
Total		70 (19)
- ^{1} Playing statistics correct to the end of 2005.

Career highlights
- AFL Rising Star nominee: 2001; VFL premiership player: 2001

Brett Johnson (born 28 October 1981) is a former Australian rules footballer who played in the Australian Football League (AFL) for Hawthorn and Carlton. He also captained Williamstown Football Club in the Victorian Football League (VFL). Raised in Western Australia where he captained the state Under 18 team, he moved to Victoria when he got drafted into the AFL.

== AFL career ==
A midfielder, Johnson was selected in the 1999 AFL draft at pick No. 23. He was recruited to Hawthorn where he spent four seasons from 2000 to 2003 before being traded to Carlton for pick No. 51 (Matthew Ball). He spent a lot of time at the Hawks playing for its VFL-affiliate, the Box Hill Hawks, but Carlton's willingness to give recycled players another chance to resurrect their careers saw Johnson join the Blues. He spent two seasons at Carlton, playing 32 games, before being delisted at the end of the 2005 season.

== VFL career ==
After his AFL career, Johnson had a successful VFL career at Williamstown. He joined the Seagulls in 2006 and was club captain from 2007 to 2011. He has twice finished second in the J. J. Liston Trophy (2006 and 2008), represented the VFL in interstate matches in 2007, 2008 and 2010 (in the last of which he was captain), was selected in the VFL team of the year in 2006, 2007 and 2008 (in the last of which he was captain), and won the Seagulls' Best and Fairest in 2008 and 2010. As captain, Johnson led the Seagulls to victory in the inaugural Foxtel Cup competition in 2011. He played a total of 124 games for Williamstown, and kicked 77 goals. He is a life member of the VFL, after having played his 175th league game in 2011.

== After Football ==
Johnson retired from the VFL at the end of 2011 to focus on his full-time job at the AFL Players Association. He took on the senior playing-coaching role at the Montrose Football Club in the Eastern Football League, leading them to a premiership win and promotion to 1st Division in 2013. Johnson played a season at leitchville gunbower in 2021 as a 40 year old.
