= Richie Saunders =

Australian rules footballer, born 1913

Personal information
- Full name: Richard William Saunders
- Born: 8 August 1913; Brunswick North, Victoria
- Died: 14 February 1978 (aged 64); Heidelberg, Victoria
- Original team: Brunswick Juniors
- Height: 178 cm (5 ft 10 in)
- Weight: 81 kg (179 lb)

Playing career^{1}
Years	Club	Games (Goals)
1933–1934	Richmond	8 (0)
1935–1936	Fitzroy	16 (0)
Total		24 (0)
- ^{1} Playing statistics correct to the end of 1936.

Richard William Saunders (8 August 1913 – 14 February 1978) was an Australian rules footballer who played with Richmond and Fitzroy in the Victorian Football League (VFL).

Saunders, originally a Brunswick junior, played two seasons at Richmond. In both seasons, Richmond made the grand final, but Saunders didn't feature in either finals series. He won the 1934 Gardiner Medal, for his performances in the seconds. He crossed over to Fitzroy in 1935 and played 13 games that year and a further three in 1936.

== Family ==
Saunders was the son of Ern Saunders, who played VFA football for Collingwood and South Melbourne Football Clubs before serving as head trainer of University and Richmond football clubs.
