= Bruce Calverley =

Australian rules footballer

Personal information
- Full name: William Bruce Calverley
- Born: 21 January 1918; Cohuna, Victoria
- Died: 14 May 1961 (aged 43); Ivanhoe East, Victoria
- Original team: Leitchville
- Height: 168 cm (5 ft 6 in)
- Weight: 68 kg (150 lb)

Playing career^{1}
Years	Club	Games (Goals)
1936–1945	Fitzroy	89 (22)
- ^{1} Playing statistics correct to the end of 1945.

William Bruce Calverley (21 January 1918 – 14 May 1961) was an Australian rules footballer who played with Fitzroy in the Victorian Football League (VFL).

Prior to establishing himself in the VFL he won the 1938 Gardiner Medal for the best player in the reserves competition. He played 89 games for Fitzroy, the most important being in the 1944 Grand Final win where he played on the wing.
