= Simon Crawshay =

Australian rules footballer

Personal information
- Full name: Simon Crawshay
- Nickname: Crawdaddy
- Born: 25 August 1974 (age 52)
- Original team: Melbourne Grammar
- Height: 200 cm (6 ft 7 in)
- Weight: 93 kg (205 lb)

Playing career^{1}
Years	Club	Games (Goals)
1994–1996	Hawthorn	19 (2)
- ^{1} Playing statistics correct to the end of 1996.

Simon Crawshay (born 25 August 1974) is a former Australian rules footballer who played with Hawthorn in the Victorian Football League (VFL).

A ruckman, Crawshay played in three seasons for Hawthorn. He made nine appearances in both 1994 and 1995 but played just once in 1996 and was delisted. In 1995 he won a Gardiner Medal for his efforts in the reserves. Simon Crawshay put much effort into his sport with Him playing only 19 games at Hawthorn with his effort successfully scoring 2 goals for the team.

Crawshay played for South Adelaide after leaving Hawthorn.

He is now a legendary mathematics teacher at Xavier College, in Melbourne, Australia. His younger brother is Olympic Gold Medallist David Crawshay.
