= Alby Jacobsen =

Australian rules footballer, born 1902

Personal information
- Full name: Albert William Jacobsen
- Born: 10 September 1902; South Melbourne, Victoria
- Died: 6 March 1989 (aged 86)
- Original team: Leopold (MAFA)
- Height: 180 cm (5 ft 11 in)
- Weight: 75 kg (165 lb)

Playing career^{1}
Years	Club	Games (Goals)
1925–1928	South Melbourne	15 (2)
1933	Essendon	7 (0)
Total		22 (2)
- ^{1} Playing statistics correct to the end of 1933.

Albert William Jacobsen (10 September 1902 – 6 March 1989) was an Australian rules footballer who played with South Melbourne and Essendon in the Victorian Football League (VFL).

Jacobsen was a follower who came to South Melbourne via amateur club Leopold. He made two appearances in the 1925 VFL season but then didn't play a senior game in 1926, although he did win the Gardiner Medal for his efforts in the seconds. After featuring in only two rounds in 1927, he put together 11 appearances the following season.

From 1929 to 1930 he played for Brunswick and returned to the VFL in 1933 to play seven games with Essendon. He then played for Sunshine.
