= Michael Redenbach (footballer, born 1949) =

Australian rules footballer

Personal information
- Full name: Michael Edward Redenbach
- Born: 1 November 1949 (age 77)
- Original team: Bairnsdale
- Height: 183 cm (6 ft 0 in)
- Weight: 83 kg (183 lb)

Playing career^{1}
| Years | Club | Games (Goals) |
| 1967–1973 | North Melbourne | 59 (40) |
| 1974–1975 | Perth | 18 (13) |
- ^{1} Playing statistics correct to the end of 1973.

Michael Edward Redenbach (born 1 November 1949) is a former Australian rules footballer who played with North Melbourne in the Victorian Football League (VFL).

Redenbach was a blond haired half forward-flanker who arrived to North Melbourne from Bairnsdale.

He won the Gardiner Medal in 1970, on a count-back, from Melbourne's Paul Callery.

At the end of the 1973 VFL season, Redenbach was one of the players traded to the Perth Football Club, so that North Melbourne could secure three time Sandover Medal winner Barry Cable.
