= Alf Brown =

Australian rules footballer, born 1914

- Brown in 1961
- Born: 6 February 1914
- Died: 28 July 2002 (aged 88)
- Occupation: Sports journalist
- Employer: The Herald
- Known for: Chief football writer
- Spouse: Joyce Brown
- Children: Bruce Brown

Alf Brown (6 February 1914 – 28 July 2002) was a leading Australian rules football writer covering the Victorian Football League (which later became the Australian Football League) from 1945 to 1979.

Brown was the chief football writer for The Herald newspaper in Melbourne during the period 1945 to 1979. He covered an estimated 1,000 matches, including 34 grand finals. He was noted for the very detailed match previews he wrote as a result of his ability to win the confidence and trust of club coaches.

Earlier in his career he covered federal politics in Canberra and was a crime reporter for The Star newspaper (which ceased publication in 1936).

His son, Bruce Brown, played for Melbourne and Essendon during the early 1970s.

Brown was inducted to the Australian Football Hall of Fame in 1996.
