= Christopher Davies (Australian cricketer) =

Australian cricket player

Chris Davies
Personal information
- Full name: Christopher James Davies
- Born: 15 November 1978 (age 47); Bedford Park, South Australia, Australia
- Batting: Right-handed
- Bowling: Right-arm off-break
- Role: Batsman

Domestic team information
- Years: Team
- 1997/98–2003/04: South Australia

Career statistics
Competition	First-class	List A
Matches	25	38
Runs scored	1,266	970
Batting average	28.13	26.94
100s/50s	2/7	1/5
Top score	125	125
Catches/stumpings	8/0	11/0
- Source: CricketArchive, 14 April 2022

Christopher James Davies (born 15 November 1978) is a retired first-class cricketer who played for the South Australia cricket team. Since retiring at the early age of 24 due to incessant shoulder injuries, he has held numerous sports administration positions, including GM Operations of the Australian Cricketers' Association, CEO of the Woodville-West Torrens Football Club, GM Football at the South Australian National Football League (SANFL) and is currently the GM Football Operations at the Carlton Football Club in the AFL.

== Playing career ==
A highly-promising number three batsman as a junior, Davies broke into the Southern Districts first XI, which played in the South Australian Grade Cricket League, aged 14 and won the South Australia Young Cricketer of the Year Award. He subsequently represented the Australian under-19s, vice-captaining the side at the 1998 Under-19 World Cup.

After co-captaining the South Australia under-19 side with Simon Goodwin, who would later quit cricket to concentrate on Australian rules football and eventually captained Australian Football League (AFL) club, the Adelaide Crows, Davies made both his First Class and List A debuts with South Australia in 1997. This was followed in 1998 by an explosive 125-run man-of-the-match performance in the Mercantile Mutual Cup against a Western Australian outfit featuring future Australian players Michael Hussey, Damien Martyn, Tom Moody, Simon Katich, Brendon Julian, Ryan Campbell and Adam Gilchrist.

Davies went on to play 25 Sheffield Shield and 38 List-A matches for South Australia, making two First Class centuries (high score of 125) and one List-A century before a series of debilitating shoulder injuries forced his premature retirement in March 2004.

Shortly before his retirement, Davies' efforts in the face of adversity were recognised at the 2003 The Advertiser-Channel 7 Sports Star of the Year Awards when he became the second recipient of the Tanya Denver Award after teammate Jason Gillespie.

Davies took the opportunity to send a message to kids with cystic fibrosis, an condition Davies also has. "Winning the Tanya Denver Award is truly an honour. I hope that by me winning this award, young kids who also suffer from cystic fibrosis might just realise it still is possible to achieve your dreams – whether in sport or other facets of life," he said.

== Coaching career ==
Upon retiring from first class level, Davies coached the Adelaide Cricket Club to the Minor Premiership of South Australia's A-Grade competition in 2004–05, winning coach of the year in the process. In May 2007 he was appointed captain-coach of the prestigious Melbourne Cricket Club on a two-year contract but resigned due to an inability to commit the necessary time to the position at the conclusion of the 2007/08 season after taking Melbourne to 2nd place in both the One Day and Two Day competitions – from 10th in season 2006/07 – and winning the Primary Edge Cup Twenty20 competition.

== Sports Administration career ==
=== Australian Cricketers' Association ===
In July 2005, Davies was appointed to the position of general manager, Cricket Operations and Membership of the Australian Cricketers' Association – the representative body of First Class and International cricketers in Australia and is widely regarded as one of the sport's best young administrators.

=== Woodville-West Torrens Football Club ===
In September 2008, Davies was appointed chief executive officer of the Woodville-West Torrens Football Club. In 2011, the Woodville-West Torrens Football Club won the SANFL Premiership and Davies' contribution to this success was widely acknowledged both from inside the Football Club and across the SANFL Competition.

=== SANFL General Manager of Football ===
In October 2012, Davies resigned from his position as CEO of Woodville-West Torrens to take up the role of SANFL General Manager of Football.

In July 2014, Davies made the bold decision to resign his position with the SANFL after not applying for the role of CEO of the SANFL following Leigh Whicker's retirement date being announced. Although the position was widely acknowledged as being his to take, he cited a want to move back into high performance sports administration at Club or team level. His two years at the SANFL had seen significant change within the SANFL with the admission of the Adelaide Crows Reserves team to the SANFL, a negotiated return of the SANFL competition to commercial television as well as wins at national competitions for the senior and junior SA state teams.

=== Port Adelaide Football Club ===
After being linked with the vacant positions of CEO of the Australian Cricketers' Association and High Performance Manager of the SACA, the Port Adelaide Football Club pulled off a coup with the announcement that Davies would replace existing General Manager of Football, Peter Rohde at the end of the 2014 season. This was seen as Port Adelaide Football Club Chairman David Koch living his mantra of the PAFC becoming an employer that talented individuals would choose to join. Davies served as General Manager of Football at the Port Adelaide Football Club for a total of eleven years, then Davies departed the Port Adelaide Football Club at the end of the 2025 AFL season. Davies was then replaced by Ben Rutten as Port Adelaide Football Club General Manager of Football.

=== Carlton Football Club ===
On 3 September 2025, it was announced that Davies was appointed General Manager of Football at the Carlton Football Club and would replace Brad Lloyd.
