= Brad Lloyd =

Australian rules footballer

Personal information
- Full name: Brad Lloyd
- Born: 16 September 1975 (age 51)
- Original team: Williamstown (VFL)
- Height: 183 cm (6 ft 0 in)
- Weight: 83 kg (183 lb)
- Position: Midfield

Playing career^{1}
Years	Club	Games (Goals)
1998–1999	Hawthorn	11 (3)
- ^{1} Playing statistics correct to the end of 1999.

Brad Lloyd (born 16 September 1975) is a former Australian rules footballer who played with Hawthorn in the Australian Football League (AFL) during the 1990s.

== Playing career ==
=== Early playing career ===
Lloyd, a midfielder from Victorian Football League (VFL) side Williamstown, had an impressive 1997 in the Hawthorn reserves and won the Gardiner Medal.

=== Hawthorn ===
Recruited by Hawthorn at the 1997 AFL draft, Lloyd made his senior AFL debut in round two of the 1998 AFL season, when Hawthorn lost to Port Adelaide in Paul Salmon's 250th league game. Lloyd appeared in the last six rounds of the year and played briefly in 1999 but in all could only manage 11 games for the seniors while at Hawthorn and kicked a total of three goals.

Lloyd never got to play a game against his brother, Essendon full-forward Matthew.

Lloyd was delisted by Hawthorn at the end of the 1999 season and returned to Williamstown, captaining the club from 2003 to 2006 and winning the Williamstown Best and Fairest award, the Gerry Callahan Medal, three times.

== Sports Administration career ==
=== Fremantle Football Club ===
Following his retirement from his playing career, Lloyd moved into football administration and previously worked in the recruiting department for AFL club Fremantle Football Club in the position of general manager of list management. Lloyd then departed the Fremantle Football Club on 14 August 2018 after he served in the club administration for a total of eleven years.

=== Carlton Football Club ===
On 14 August 2018, Lloyd was appointed General Manager of Football at the Carlton Football Club, when he replaced the outgoing Andrew McKay who stepped down from the position. On 11 August 2025, Carlton Football Club announced Lloyd would depart and part ways with the club from his role as General Manager of Football at the end of the 2025 AFL season. Lloyd was replaced by Chris Davies as General Manager of Football at the Carlton Football Club.
