= James Bennett (Australian footballer) =

Australian rules footballer

Personal information
- Full name: James Bennett
- Born: 5 November 1964 (age 61)
- Original team: Collegians
- Height: 188 cm (6 ft 2 in)
- Weight: 79 kg (174 lb)

Playing career^{1}
Years	Club	Games (Goals)
1984–1985	Hawthorn	7 (4)
- ^{1} Playing statistics correct to the end of 1985.

James Bennett (born 5 November 1964) is a former Australian rules footballer who played with Hawthorn in the Victorian Football League (VFL).

Bennett was a Collegians footballer, who spent most of his time with Hawthorn in the reserves, due to the strength of the senior team. He played perhaps his best game, in the opening round of the 1985 VFL season, when he had 18 disposals and kicked three goals against Geelong. He was a member of Hawthorn's reserves premiership winning side that year and tied with teammate Greg Dear for the Gardiner Medal.
