= John Rhoden =

American sculptor

- Born: John Walter Rhoden; March 13, 1916; Birmingham, Alabama, U.S.
- Died: January 4, 2001 (aged 82); Queens, New York, U.S.
- Education: Talladega College, Columbia University, American Academy in Rome
- Known for: Sculpture

John Walter Rhoden (March 13, 1916 – January 4, 2001) was an American sculptor from Birmingham, Alabama.

Rhoden graduated from Birmingham's Industrial High School, and then enrolled at Talladega College on an art scholarship. At the suggestion of Hale Woodruff, he moved to New York in 1938, where he began studying with Richmond Barthé. Rhoden worked in wood and bronze, and created a number of commissioned works including Untitled (Family) at Harlem Hospital Center; Mitochondria at Bellevue Hospital Center in Manhattan; Curved Wal at the African American Museum in Philadelphia; Zodiacal Structure at the Sheraton Hotel in Philadelphia; and a sculpture of Frederick Douglass at Lincoln University.

== Life ==
Rhoden served in World War II, studied at the School of Painting and Sculpture at Columbia University, and was named a Fulbright Fellow in 1951. He won a Rome Prize Fellowship from the American Academy in Rome in 1952. In 1956, he was a member of an artists delegation that visited the Soviet Union, Poland and Yugoslavia under a grant from the Rockefeller Foundation.

After his time traveling with the State Department, the Rhodens returned to New York City in 1960. Shortly thereafter, John Rhoden left for Indonesia on a Rockefeller Foundation grant to set up a bronze foundry at the Institut Teknologi in Bandung, from 1961 through 1963.

At Columbia University, he studied under William Zorach, Oronzio Maldarelli and Hugo Robus.

== Personal life ==
Rhoden was married to Richanda Rhoden, a Native American artist.

== Institutional acknowledgement ==
Rhoden's works have been displayed in the Metropolitan Museum of Art, the Pennsylvania Academy of the Fine Arts, the Art Institute of Chicago, and the Boston Museum of Fine Arts.

In February 2019, the Pennsylvania Academy of the Fine Arts (PAFA) officially opened the John and Richanda Roden Arts Center, locating the Center in a previously unused lower level of the Samuel M.V. Hamilton Building which occupies an arts complex with the Furness and Hewitt Historic Landmark Building.
