= Selwyn Baker =

Australian rules footballer (1911–1996)

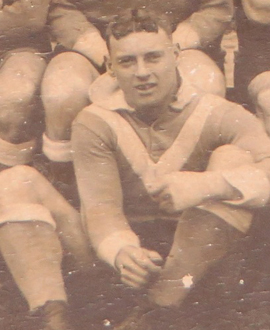
- Baker during his North Melbourne career

Personal information
- Full name: Selwyn James Baker
- Born: 9 April 1911; Wonthaggi, Victoria
- Died: 16 September 1996 (aged 85)
- Original team: Kew
- Height: 166 cm (5 ft 5 in)
- Weight: 67 kg (148 lb)

Playing career^{1}
Years	Club	Games (Goals)
1931–1934	North Melbourne	37 (42)
1934	Collingwood	1 (1)
Total		38 (43)
- ^{1} Playing statistics correct to the end of 1934.

Selwyn James Baker (9 April 1911 – 16 September 1996) was an Australian rules footballer who played with North Melbourne and Collingwood in the Victorian Football League (VFL).

Baker played his early football at Scotch College and for Kew. He spent the 1930 season with the Richmond seconds and was a joint winner of that year's Gardiner Medal.

Having not made any senior appearance while at Richmond, Baker made his league debut in 1931, with North Melbourne. A rover, he was their third leading goal-kicker in 1932 with 27 goals and was a VFL interstate representative in 1933.

He changed clubs during the 1934 VFL season, joining Collingwood, the club his elder brothers Ted and Reg had previously played for. His stint at Collingwood was short and his appearance in round 17 was the only senior game he would play for them.

Baker, who was also a professional runner, spent some time with the Brighton Football Club later in the decade.
