= Brad Gotch =

Australian rules footballer and coach (born 1962)

Personal information
- Full name: Bradley Gotch
- Born: 23 June 1962 (age 64)
- Original team: East Doncaster
- Height: 166 cm (5 ft 5 in)
- Weight: 64 kg (10 st 1 lb)

Playing career^{1}
Years	Club	Games (Goals)
1982–1985	Fitzroy (VFL/AFL)	43 (60)
1985	Port Adelaide (SANFL)	11 (25)
1986–1990	St Kilda (VFL/AFL)	53 (62)

Coaching career
Years	Club	Games (W–L–D)
1996–1997	Springvale	42 (30–12–0)
2002–2009	Williamstown	161 (93–66–2)
2010–2011	Casey	40 (25–15–0)
2014–2016	South Adelaide	59 (36–22–1)
2021–2022	West Adelaide	16 (2-16-0)
- ^{1} Playing statistics correct to the end of 2016.

Bradley Gotch (born 23 June 1962) is a former Australian rules footballer who played for Fitzroy and St Kilda in the Victorian/Australian Football League (VFL/AFL). He was most recently the head coach of West Adelaide in the SANFL.

Gotch was one of the smallest players of his era at 165 centimetres or 5 feet 5 inches but possessed an accurate left foot pass. Debuting in 1982 for Fitzroy, Gotch played thirty games in his first three years. In 1985 he played three games in the first six rounds before being delisted by Fitzroy and finishing the season with Port Adelaide in the South Australian National Football League (SANFL). After impressing at Port Adelaide, he returned to Melbourne to play for the St Kilda Football Club. His best goal kicking feat was for St Kilda against his old side Fitzroy where he kicked seven goals in a game in 1987. He finished his career playing for Dandenong Football Club in the Victorian Football Association (VFA).

== Coaching career ==
Gotch coached Williamstown in the Victorian Football League (VFL) from 2002 to 2009, becoming the second-longest serving coach in the club's history, coaching the club to finals in six of the eight years including the 2003 VFL premiership. He also worked in development coaching roles with both Collingwood and the Western Bulldogs alignments during those years. In 2010 Gotch was appointed senior coach of the Casey Scorpions, taking over from Peter German. He joined Port Adelaide as an assistant coach on 19 October 2011. In 2014, Gotch signed a two-year contract to coach South Adelaide in the SANFL.

Gotch's sons also play high level sport. Xavier Gotch plays for South Adelaide under Gotch, and Seb Gotch played cricket for the Melbourne Stars.
