= Ben Jolley =

Australian rules footballer (born 1986)

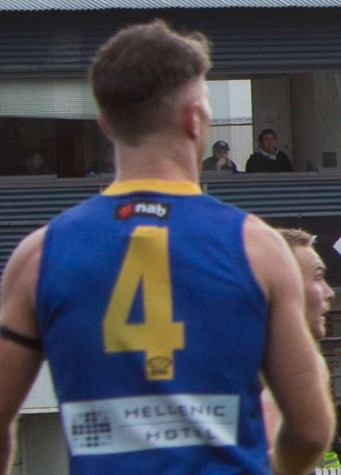
- Jolley playing for Williamstown in 2018

Personal information
- Born: 12 February 1986 (age 40)
- Original teams: Strathmore; Calder Cannons (TAC Cup)
- Debut: 15 July 2006, Essendon vs. St Kilda, at MCG
- Height: 185 cm (6 ft 1 in)
- Weight: 74 kg (163 lb)

Playing career^{1}
Years	Club	Games (Goals)
2005–2007	Bendigo	52 (16)
2006	Essendon (AFL)	4 (0)
2008–2018	Williamstown	217 (71)
2019–2021	Port Melbourne	18 (0)
2022	Essendon reserves	3 (0)
2023	Williamstown	16 (1)
- ^{1} Playing statistics correct to the end of 2023.

Ben Jolley (born 12 February 1986) is a former Australian rules footballer who last played for Williamstown in the Victorian Football League.

A midfielder from the Calder Cannons, Jolley was picked up by the Essendon Football Club as a rookie in 2005. He played a total of four AFL games for Essendon before being cut by the club at the end of the 2006 season. He then continued his football career with the Bendigo Bombers, Essendon's VFL-affiliate, and then moved to Williamstown where in 2010 he finished third in the J. J. Liston Trophy, awarded for the VFL best and fairest.

After leaving the Seagulls at the conclusion of the 2018 VFL season, Jolley signed with Williamstown's rivals Port Melbourne in 2019. He'd then play a season for Essendon’s reserves in 2022, before returning to Williamstown in 2023.

Jolley is the VFA/VFL games record holder. He played his 303rd game in July 2023 to break the record previously held by Bill Swan, finishing his career with 306 games.
