= Richanda Rhoden =

Biography of artist Richenda Rhoden

Richenda Rhoden
- John Rhoden and Richenda Rhoden
- Born: 1917; Washington State
- Died: 2016 (aged 98–99); New York
- Education: Columbia University
- Partner: John Rhoden

Richenda Rhoden (1917–2016) was a Native-American painter, socialite, and New York icon best known as the wife of famed artist, John Rhoden. Rhoden is known for incorporating Native-American symbols and mythology into her work. Her career only began posthumously with Rhoden's first solo exhibition/tribute curated by neighbor and friend Emily Weiner (cofounder of Soloway Gallery).

== Life and career ==
=== Early years ===
Rhoden (née Phillips) was half Cherokee and half Menominee. Her parents met in Pennsylvania at the Indian Industrial School. Richenda was named after Richard Henry Pratt, the school's founder. Richenda was given the name Paytoemahtamo, a Menominee name which means great woman.

Her father went to Northwestern law school and later became the 1st Native-American judge in Washington State and later the mayor of Aberdeen.

Richenda attended the University of Washington in Seattle, where she met college sweetheart, Lawrence Lew Kay, whom she married and who subsequently died in WWII. Wanting a new start, Richenda moved to New York to attend Columbia University and pursue a master's degree in Asian Art. While at Columbia, she met John Rhoden, an African-American sculptor and rising artist star from Birmingham, Alabama.

In 1951, Richenda gave up her studies to follow John to Italy for his Fulbright Fellowship. The couple never had children and traveled extensively for John's art career.

=== Middle years ===
In 1960, the Rhoden's decided to purchase a converted livery stable, built in 1899 and located at 23 Cranberry Street, Brooklyn, New York, in the Brooklyn Heights neighborhood of New York. Rumor has it that Isamu Noguchi was also interested in the building, but that the Rhoden's purchased it before him.

After moving to New York, Rhoden became a neighborhood legend. While her husband John was managing a successful career, Rhoden began curating and developing exhibitions held in the living room of her apartment.

Rhoden is also credited with starting the Cranberry Street Fair, which earned her a nomination from her neighbors for "New Yorker of the Week" on the local television network.

=== Later years ===
Towards the end of her life, Rhoden began to use a wheelchair. With her limited mobility, she decided to convert the freight elevator of her house into her studio. She died at age 99.

== Art career ==
By all accounts, Rhoden was a prolific artist, painting every single day of her life. The subjects of Richenda's paintings are often sacred geometry, animals, and nature and were informed by her Native-American culture, often including layers of Native-American mythology and folklore.

How often Rhoden exhibited her work is still being determined, but archives of her life with her husband point to the couple often exhibiting together abroad during their travels.

After Rhoden's death, Soloway Gallery decided to stage a solo/tribute exhibition of Rhoden's work. The gallery's curated selections highlighted how Rhoden's work could have been positioned during her lifetime. The paintings selected were in the vein of abstract impressionism, completed mainly between the 50s and 80s, but with a highly contemporary feel. Most of the works are in oil, are untitled, and undated, which curator Emily Weiner was able to save from the Rhoden's heirless estate.

The show is essential because Rhoden included Native American imagery in her works. In Untitled (Bear) (c. 1970), a towering bear highlights the myths contained in both Cherokee and Menominee culture. For the Cherokee, the bear was something to be feared—a violent enemy. For the Menominee, the bear is more akin to ancestors. In Rhoden's depiction, the viewer is tasked with ascertaining whether the bear is meant to protect or devour.

In a review of the show by Art Forum, writer Mira Dayal illustrates the absence of Rhoden's work from public consumption quite clearly when she states, "[the] images evoke the constraints of interiority, protection, and domesticity that bound Rhoden’s work from circulation." Rhoden spent much of her life supporting her husband's career.

Of Rhoden's work, Dayal is quick to mention that the works fall between "exuberant and tortured" and that the visitor is surrounded by Rhoden's fragmented and "hallucinatory visions" often portrayed in signature pastel hazes and in "fleshy pinks, oranges and jaundiced yellows."
