= Jack O'Halloran (footballer) =

Australian rules footballer

Personal information
- Full name: Raymond John O'Halloran
- Born: 9 July 1929; Geelong, Victoria
- Died: 31 December 2010 (aged 81); Sunshine Coast, Queensland
- Original team: Essendon YCW
- Height: 174 cm (5 ft 9 in)
- Weight: 72 kg (159 lb)

Playing career^{1}
| Years | Club | Games (Goals) |
| 1950–1951 | Essendon | 10 (3) |
| 1952–1956 | North Melbourne | 75 (56) |
| 1957–1958 | Footscray | 17 (13) |
| Total | | 102 (72) |
- ^{1} Playing statistics correct to the end of 1958.

Raymond "Jack" O'Halloran (9 July 1929 – 31 December 2010) was a former Australian rules footballer who played for Essendon, North Melbourne and Footscray in the VFL during the 1950s.

A rover, O'Halloran made his league debut with Essendon in 1950 but struggled to get regular game time. As a result, he crossed to North Melbourne where he remained for five seasons, winning their best and fairest award in 1953. He finished his VFL career at Footscray, playing 17 games for the club in a season and a half.

In 1958, O'Halloran briefly transferred to Yarraville in the Victorian Football Association. He was granted a permit by the Association, but it was revoked after playing only one game when the Permit Committee realised it had made an error – O'Halloran was 28, but the rules required that a player had to be 27 or less to transfer from the VFL to the VFA, unless was transferring as a coach or met residential criteria, which at that time O'Halloran did not. He returned to Yarraville in 1959 and finished his career there.
