= Peter Maloni =

Australian rules footballer

Personal information
- Full name: Peter Maloni
- Born: 1 December 1964 (age 61)
- Original team: Noble Park
- Height: 175 cm (5 ft 9 in)
- Weight: 76 kg (168 lb)

Playing career^{1}
Years	Club	Games (Goals)
1983	Sydney	1 (0)
- ^{1} Playing statistics correct to the end of 1983.

Peter Maloni (born 1 December 1964) is a former Australian rules footballer who played with Sydney in the Victorian Football League (VFL).
