= Ian Rickman =

Australian rules footballer and coach

Personal information
- Full name: Ian Rickman
- Born: 24 March 1963 (age 63)
- Original team: Lakes EntrancePreston
- Height: 183 cm (6 ft 0 in)
- Weight: 93 kg (205 lb)
- Position: Forward

Playing career^{1}
Years	Club	Games (Goals)
1982–84	Footscray	11 (10)
1985–1993	Williamstown	146 (516)
- ^{1} Playing statistics correct to the end of 1984.

Ian Rickman (born 24 March 1963) is a former Australian rules footballer who played for Footscray in the Victorian Football League (VFL) during the 1980s.

Rickman, who was of a large build, arrived at Footscray from Preston. He spent three seasons with Footscray and put in his most notable performance in 1984 when he kicked six goals against North Melbourne at Arden Street.

Williamstown was his next destination and he went on to have a successful career with the VFA club, mostly as a half forward flanker and at full-forward. A dual premiership player, Rickman was a member of Williamstown's 1986 and 1990 Grand Final winning teams. He also twice won the VFA award for being the league's leading goal-kicker, now known as the Jim 'Frosty' Miller Medal, in 1989 after kicking 125 goals and then with 82 in 1992. Rickman was later named on a half forward flank in the official Williamstown 'Team of the Century'.

He captain-coached Geelong Football League club Lara in 1994 and 1995.
