= Colin Boyd (footballer) =

Australian rules footballer (born 1954)

Personal information
- Full name: Colin G. Boyd
- Born: 27 July 1954 (age 72)
- Original teams: St Patrick's, Sale
- Height: 180 cm (5 ft 11 in)
- Weight: 81 kg (179 lb)

Playing career^{1}
Years	Club	Games (Goals)
1973	Footscray	10 (0)
1977–1979	Essendon	34 (0)
Total		44 (0)
- ^{1} Playing statistics correct to the end of 1979.

Colin G. Boyd (born 27 July 1954) is a former Australian rules footballer who played with Footscray and Essendon in the Victorian Football League (VFL) during the 1970s.

Boyd, who was from Sale, spent the 1973 VFL season at Footscray. A defender, he played for VFA club Williamstown in 1975 and 1976. In the second of those years he was a Field Medal winner, for the 'best and fairest' in the league's second division. and also played in Williamstown's premiership win over Mordialloc at Toorak Park. Boyd was also runner-up in the Club best and fairest award in both seasons. He was selected on a half-back flank in Williamstown's 1970's Team-of-the-Decade. Boyd played 37 games and kicked 3 goals for the VFA Seagulls.

Essendon gave him a second chance at VFL football in 1977 and he missed just three games in his first season and was awarded 16 Brownlow Medal votes. Only Simon Madden took home more votes for Essendon in the count. By 1979 he was playing most of his football in the reserves and won the Gardiner Medal.

From 1980 to 1987, Boyd played at Leongatha and was their captain-coach in 1980, 1981 and 1987.
