= Michael Redenbach (footballer, born 1959) =

Australian rules footballer

Personal information
- Full name: Michael J. Redenbach
- Born: 3 June 1959 (age 67)
- Original team: Burnie
- Height: 170 cm (5 ft 7 in)
- Weight: 72 kg (159 lb)

Playing career^{1}
Years	Club	Games (Goals)
1978	Essendon	3 (0)
- ^{1} Playing statistics correct to the end of 1978.

Michael J. Redenbach (born 3 June 1959) is a former Australian rules footballer who played with Essendon in the Victorian Football League (VFL).

Redenbach, a Tasmanian from Burnie, played just three games for Essendon. He appeared against Carlton, Footscray and North Melbourne in the 1978 VFL season.

A rover, he played with City-South and East Launceston in the NTFA in the late 1970s and early 1980s, and with Werribee in the mid 1980s, being club captain in 1984 and 1985.
