= Phil Rhoden =

Australian rules footballer

Personal information
- Full name: Philip Hamilton Rhoden
- Born: 15 October 1945 (age 81)
- Original team: University Blues
- Height: 178 cm (5 ft 10 in)
- Weight: 80 kg (176 lb)
- Position: Back pocket

Playing career^{1}
Years	Club	Games (Goals)
1968–1969	Melbourne	3 (0)
- ^{1} Playing statistics correct to the end of 1969.

Philip Hamilton Rhoden (born 15 October 1945) is a former Australian rules footballer who played with Melbourne in the Victorian Football League (VFL).

Rhoden was recruited by Melbourne from Richmond, who he had trained with, but was originally from the University Blues where he was runner up for the Victorian Amateur Football Association league best and fairest in 1965. He won the Gardiner Medal in 1968 for his performances in the reserves but played only three senior games for Melbourne. After leaving Melbourne, Rhoden played three senior matches and four reserves matches for Victorian Football Association team Sandringham in 1972.

A solicitor by profession, in 1979 he served as a committee member for the Melbourne Football Club.
