= Williamstown Football Club =

Australian rules football club

Names
- Full name: Williamstown Football Club
- Nickname(s): Seagulls, Towners, Willy

2025 season
- After finals: VFL: 8th VFLW: 4th
- Home-and-away season: VFL: 10th of 21; VFLW: 5th of 12

Club details
- Founded: 1864; 162 years ago
- Colours: Blue Gold
- Competition: VFL: Men's; VFLW: Women's
- President: Merryl Dooley
- CEO: Ashley Baker
- Coach: VFL: Justin Plapp; VFLW: Paul Groves
- Captain(s): VFL: Finbar O’Dwyer; VFLW: Eliza Straford
- Premierships: VFA/VFL (Div 1) (14): 1907; 1921; 1939; 1945; 1949; 1954; 1955; 1956; 1958; 1959; 1986; 1990; 2003; 2015; VFA (Div 2) (2): 1969; 1976
- Ground: DSV Stadium (7,500)

Uniforms
Home

Other information
- Official website: williamstownfc.com.au

The Williamstown Football Club, nicknamed the Seagulls, is an Australian rules football club based in the Melbourne suburb of Williamstown. The club currently competes in the Victorian Football League (VFL) and VFL Women's (VFLW) competitions.

== History ==
The Williamstown Football Club was formed in 1864, making it one of the oldest football clubs in Australia. The club was initially considered a junior club, before being granted senior status in 1884. Starting in 1884, the club competed in the Victorian Football Association. Williamstown's original colours were black and yellow.

When it joined the VFA, the Williamstown Football Club sought to play its matches at the Williamstown Cricket Ground, but was not granted permission owing to a dispute with the Williamstown Cricket Club, and instead used the unfenced Gardens Reserve as its home ground. In 1886, players wishing to play on the cricket ground ultimately established a rival senior club, the South Williamstown Football Club, which also contested the VFA for two seasons. In 1888, the dispute was settled and two football clubs amalgamated; and, through an organisational affiliation with the cricket club the Williamstown Cricket Ground was established as the football club's permanent home ground. The Williamstown and South Williamstown clubs were off-field rivals, but they never played a match against each other.

The suburb of Williamstown was named after King William IV in 1837 and was often referred to as "the village" or "the fishing village" in nineteenth-century Melbourne; the club was thus known by the nickname "the Villagers" in its early years. In the late 1930s, Larry Floyd and Bill Dooley decided to adopt a more modern nickname, and the club became formally known as "the Seagulls". Throughout its history, the club has also been colloquially known by the abbreviated name '‘Town.

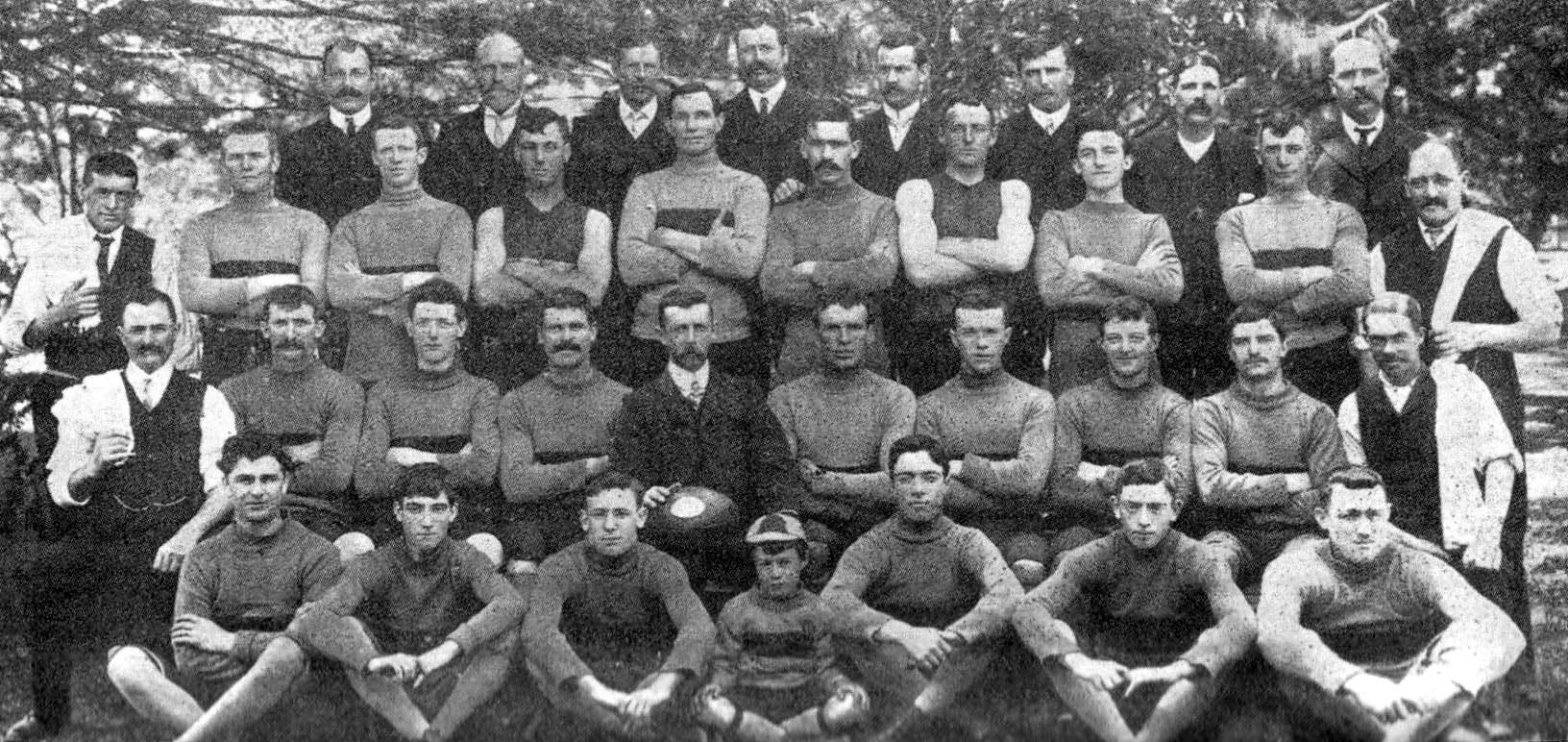
Senior team in 1907

Williamstown won its first VFA premiership in 1907, and its second in 1921. Following three unsuccessful finals appearances between 1922 and 1924, the club was weak for the next fourteen seasons, winning just 77 of 255 matches and playing just one final – losing to Oakleigh in 1930. Owing to severe local employment problems during the Great Depression, the club was consistently short of money, despite a number of notable individual successes with several players winning Recorder Cups and VFA Medals.

As a result of skilful management by such officials as secretary Larry Floyd, president Bill Dooley and treasurer Jim McConville, plus the termination of contract agreements with the VFL, Williamstown recruited Harry Vallence, a star goal-kicker from Carlton, plus Gordon Ogden and Eric Glass from Melbourne for the 1939 season. Williamstown finished fourth on the ladder but, despite not having won a final since 1924 won three close finals for its third VFA premiership. The Seagulls continued their recruiting raid on the VFL, recruiting star players Ron Todd and Des Fothergill, and won the first post-war premiership in 1945.

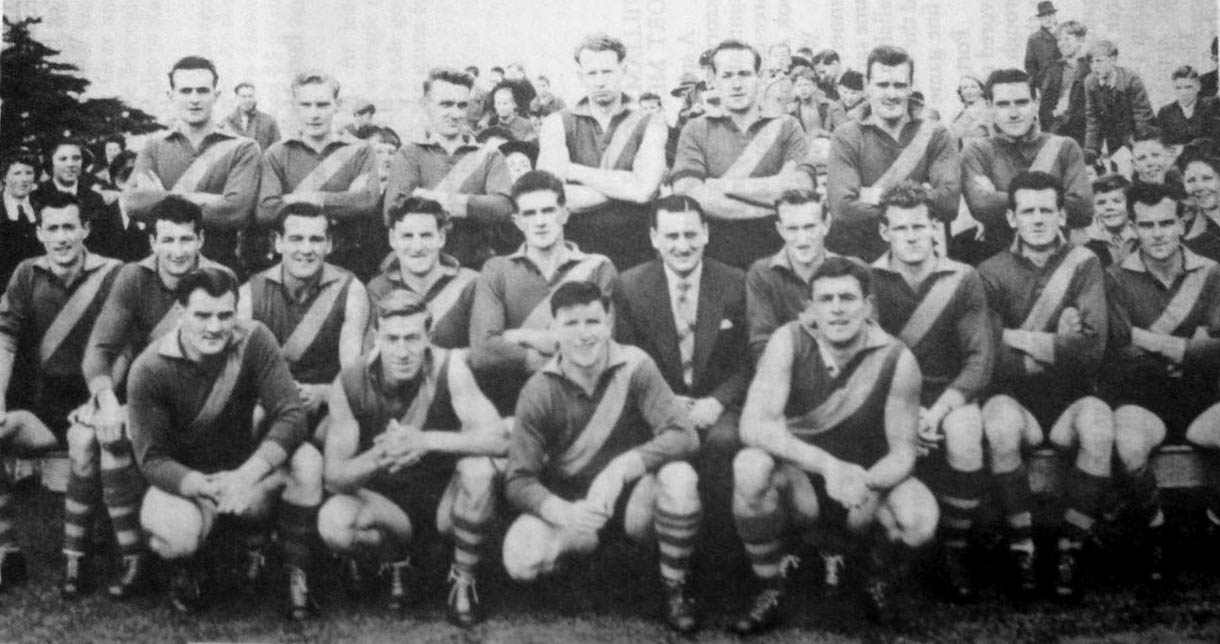
1954 team

Following the end of the throw-pass era in 1950, many Association clubs began to struggle through the following decade as the prestige of the VFA declined. However, Williamstown's strong support through the local community meant that it was still able to recruit a strong calibre of player; and, with the recruitment of former North Melbourne coach Wally Carter, who brought a VFL-level of professionalism to the team, the mid-to-late 1950s became the strongest era in the club's history. Under Carter, the club won three consecutive premierships in 1954, 1955 and 1956, and was unbeaten in the 1957 home-and-away season before losing two semi-finals and finishing third. Carter was replaced as coach in 1958 by club legend Gerry Callahan, who served as captain-coach until 1959, and premierships followed in 1958 and 1959, to give the club five flags in six years.

Williamstown's form slumped in the 1960s and 1970s, and it finished last in Division 1 in 1967, resulting in relegation to Division 2. It won the Division 2 premiership in 1969 under captain-coach Max Papley to return to Division 1. The club was relegated again in 1975, won the Division 2 premiership in 1976 under the coaching of Mal Allen, but was relegated again after 1977 and remained in Division 2 for a few years thereafter.

Despite playing in the lower division, the club remained one of the best-supported and most viable clubs in the VFA; and in 1982, when the divisional structure was modified such that the top division was selected primarily on off-field merits, Williamstown returned to Division 1 despite having finished only seventh out of ten teams the previous year.

Terry Wheeler was appointed captain-coach in 1984, and he and president Tony Hannebery were critical in gathering a strong group of players, including Barry Round and Tony Pastore, to make Williamstown one of the strongest clubs in the late 1980s. The club reached five grand finals between 1985 and 1990: it lost the 1985 decider by one goal to Sandringham, won the 1986 premiership against Coburg under Wheeler, lost consecutive grand finals against Coburg in 1988 and 1989, then defeated Springvale to win the 1990 premiership under captain-coach Barry Round. Despite this finals success, the club's best home-and-away finish in those six years was second, achieved only in 1989.

During the middle 1990s Williamstown slipped, and at its nadir in 1995, the club failed to win a game in either the firsts or seconds. At the end of the 1995 season, the club's survival was threatened when the Victorian State Football League sought to align the VFA (which at that time renamed the VFL) with the TAC Cup, and needed only one western suburban team to align with the Western Jets; as such, it ordered Williamstown to merge with Werribee. After the clubs could not agree to terms, the VSFL decided to grant the remaining licence and the affiliation with the Jets to Williamstown, resulting in Werribee's temporary expulsion from the VFL. (Werribee regained its licence a month later after threatening legal action).

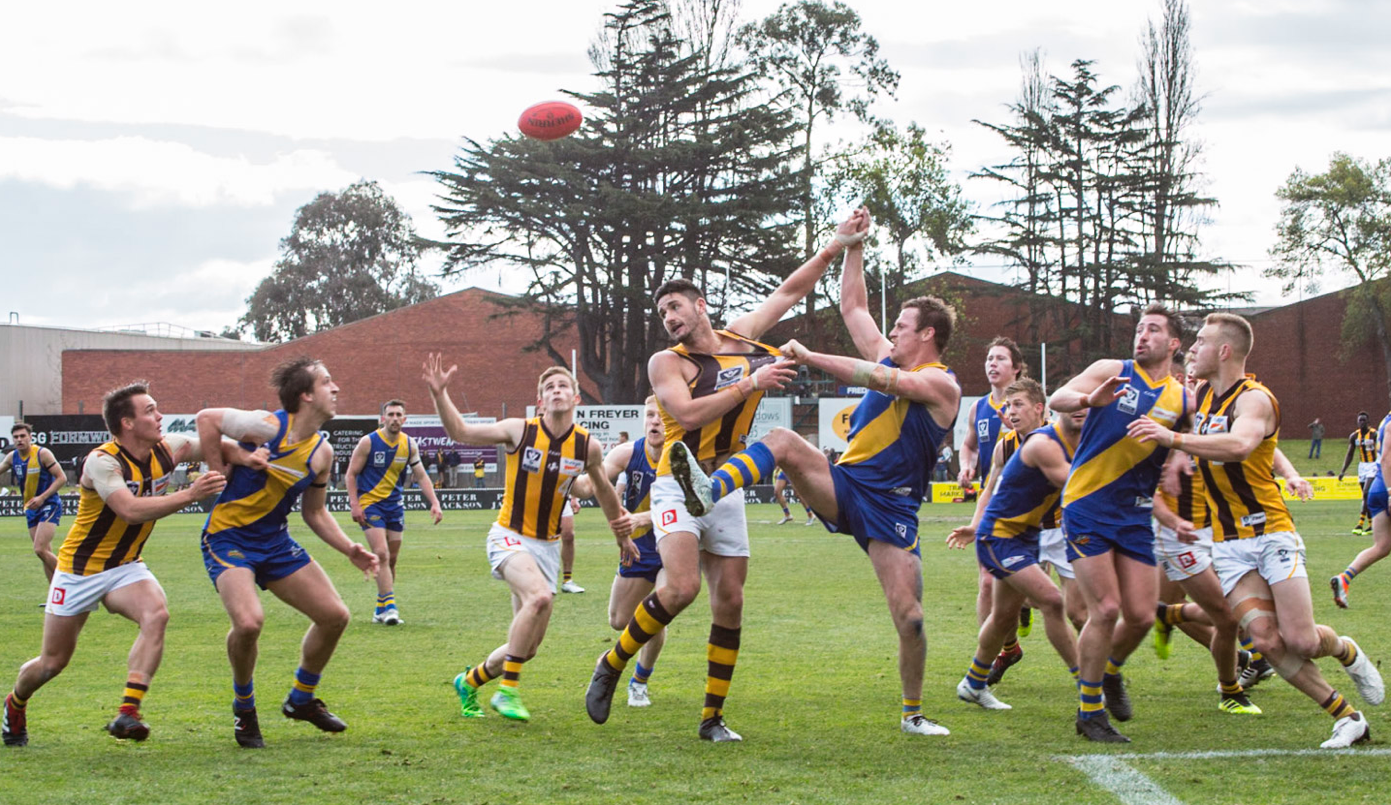
Williamstown vs Box Hill at North Port Oval in the 2nd Preliminary Final of the 2018 VFL season

In 2001, Williamstown entered into an affiliation with the Australian Football League's Collingwood Football Club, under which Collingwood's reserves players were permitted to play in Williamstown's senior team when they were not selected in AFL matches. Williamstown and Collingwood were affiliated from 2001 until 2007, during which time the club won one premiership, in 2003. The partnership with Collingwood ended after 2007, and a new affiliation was established with the Western Bulldogs, which lasted from 2008 until 2013. Williamstown and the Western Bulldogs ended their affiliation after the 2013 season, and since 2014, Williamstown has competed as a stand-alone senior club in the VFL, with no AFL affiliation.

The club was perennially competitive under both its affiliation with the Western Bulldogs and as a stand-alone team during the 2010s, and between 2006 and 2019 did not finished lower than fifth in the competition. These sustained strong performances yielded thirteen preliminary final appearances in fourteen years and three grand final appearances, for a premiership victory in 2015 and finishing second behind an unbeaten Port Melbourne in 2011 and behind the Richmond reserves in 2019. During this time, Williamstown also won the Foxtel Cup competition twice.

Since the 2018 season, the club has fielded a senior women's team in the VFL Women's competition.

== Honours ==
=== Club achievements ===
Premierships
Competition	Level	Wins	Years won
Victorian Football League	Seniors (Division 1)	14	1907, 1921, 1939, 1945, 1949, 1954, 1955, 1956, 1958, 1959, 1986, 1990, 2003, 2015
Victorian Football League	Seniors (Division 2)	2	1969, 1976
VFA/VFL Reserves	Division 1	13	1941, 1948, 1955, 1956, 1966, 1986, 2002, 2003, 2005, 2008, 2013, 2014, 2015
VFA/VFL Reserves	Division 2	2	1969, 1980
VFA/VFL Thirds	Division 1	4	1958, 1971, 1986, 1987
VFA/VFL Thirds	Division 2	3	1969, 1979, 1981
Other titles and honours
Foxtel Cup	Seniors	2	2011, 2014
Lightning Premiership	Seniors	1	1946
Finishing positions
Victorian Football League (Division 1)	Minor premiership	11	1907, 1940, 1948, 1949, 1956, 1957, 1958, 1959, 1964, 2010, 2017
Victorian Football League (Division 1)	Runners-up	12	1900, 1924, 1948, 1961, 1964, 1970, 1985, 1988, 1989, 1992, 2011, 2019
Victorian Football League (Division 1)	Wooden spoons	10	1890, 1892, 1926, 1934, 1935, 1938, 1967, 1975, 1977, 1995
VFL Women's	Minor premiership	2	2024, 2026
VFL Women's	Runners-up	1	2026
VFL Women's	Wooden spoons	1	2019

=== VFA best and fairest ===
- Recorder Cup: Charlie Stanbridge (1933), Neville Huggins (1937), Arthur Cutting (1938), Des Fothergill (1941)
- V.F.A. Medal: Charlie Stanbridge (1933), Fred Brooks (1935), Neville Huggins (1936, 1937), Arthur Cutting (1938, 1939), Des Fothergill (1941)
- J. J. Liston Trophy: John Martin (1956), Barry Round (1987), Brett McTaggart (1988), Saade Ghazi (1989), Paul Dooley (1996), Michael Gibbons (2016, 2018)
- J. Field Medal (Division 2): Ian Nankervis (1968), Colin Boyd (1976)

=== Norm Goss Medalists ===
- Tony Pastore (1986), Barry Round (1990), Adrian Fletcher (2003), Michael Gibbons (2015)

=== Fothergill–Round Medalists ===
- Julian Shanks (1992), Paul Dooley (1996), Jackson Barling (2005), Adam Marcon (2015)

== Honour Roll ==
Year

- 2000
- 2001
- 2002
- 2003
- 2004
- 2005
- 2006
- 2007
- 2008
- 2009
- 2010
- 2011
- 2012
- 2013

Captains

- Troy West
- Troy West
- Troy West
- Troy West & Brad Lloyd
- Troy West & Brad Lloyd
- Brad Lloyd
- Brad Lloyd
- Brett Johnson
- Brett Johnson
- Brett Johnson
- Brett Johnson
- Brett Johnson
- Ben Jolley
- Ben Jolley

Coaches

- Andrew Bews
- Andrew Bews
- Brad Gotch
- Brad Gotch
- Brad Gotch
- Brad Gotch
- Brad Gotch
- Brad Gotch
- Brad Gotch
- Brad Gotch
- Peter German
- Peter German
- Peter German
- Peter German

Gerry Callahan Medalists

- Brad Lloyd
- Brad Lloyd
- Adrian Fletcher
- Adrian Fletcher
- Brad Lloyd
- Jeremy Dukes
- Steven Greene
- Ben Davies
- Liam Picken & Brett Johnson
- Wayde Skipper
- Brett Johnson
- Ben Jolley
- Ben Jolley
- Cameron Lockwood

== Club Records ==
- Most Games: Ben Jolley (233)
- Most Goals: Ron Todd (672)

Williamstown also holds the record for the highest ever score in Australian rules football, in any league and at any grade, with a 675 point win over Geelong West in a 1983 thirds division match.

== Team Of The Century ==
Back	Eric Beitzel	Max Munday	John Ramsay
Half back	Brett McTaggart	Gerry Callahan	Colin Wilcox
Centre	Jim Caldwell	Max Papley	John Martin
Half forward	Ray Smith	Ron Todd	Ian Rickman
Forward	Harry Simpson	Mark Fotheringham	Saade Ghazi
Ruck	Barry Round	Eric Glass	Alby Linton
Interchange	Reg Harley	Bob Jones	Len Kent
	Kim Kershaw	Tony Pastore	Tom Russell
Captain	Gerry Callahan		
Coach	Wally Carter		

== Club song ==
The club song is "Stand and Deliver", was written and performed by Mike Brady since 2009.

== Jumper ==
The Williamstown Football Club's guernsey consists of a royal blue background with a diagonal yellow sash.
