= Paul Callery =

Australian rules footballer

Personal information
- Born: 18 April 1950 (age 76)
- Original team: Oakleigh YCW
- Height: 165 cm (5 ft 5 in)
- Weight: 68 kg (150 lb)

Playing career^{1}
Years	Club	Games (Goals)
1970–1973	Melbourne	76 (102)
1974–1980	St Kilda	105 (98)
1980	South Melbourne	1 (0)
Total		182 (200)
- ^{1} Playing statistics correct to the end of 1980.

Paul Callery (born 18 April 1950) is a former Australian rules footballer who played for Melbourne, St Kilda and South Melbourne in the Victorian Football League (VFL) during the 1970s.

Callery was a rover and started his career in 1970 with Melbourne, topping their goalkicking in 1971 with 38 goals. He had worked his way into the senior side after impressing in the under-19s where he was a Morrish Medallist in 1968. One of the smallest players in the league, Callery crossed to St Kilda in 1974 and went on to play 105 games with the club before finishing his career with a stint at South Melbourne in 1980 which lasted just one game.
