= Barry Round =

Australian rules footballer (1950–2022)

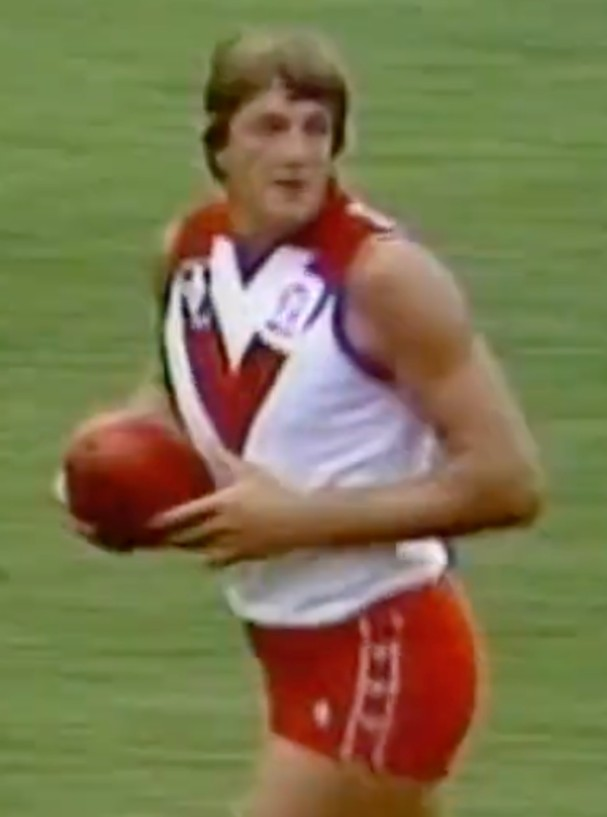
- Round playing for the Swans in 1982

Personal information
- Full name: Barry James Round
- Born: 26 January 1950
- Died: 24 December 2022 (aged 72)
- Height: 193 cm (6 ft 4 in)
- Weight: 108 kg (17 st 0 lb; 238 lb)
- Position: Ruckman/Tall Forward

Playing career
Years	Club	Games (Goals)
1968–75	Footscray	135 (136)
1976–85	South Melbourne/Sydney	193 (157)
1986–91	Williamstown	110 (103)
Total		438 (396)

Representative team honours
Years	Team	Games (Goals)
????–??	Victorian Football League	8 (4)
????–??	Victorian Football Association	3 (4)

Coaching career
Years	Club	Games (W–L–D)
1989–93	Williamstown	?? (??)

Career highlights
- VFL debut for Footscray vs Fitzroy in 1969 at Princes Park; Brownlow Medallist 1981; Williamstown premiership Captain-Coach in 1986 and 1990; Williamstown Inaugural Hall of Fame Inductee 2014; Elevated to Legend Status Williamstown Hall of Fame 2014; VFA J. J. Liston Trophy winner in 1987; VFA Norm Goss Medalist 1990 Grand Final; Australian Football Hall of Fame inductee

Barry James Round (26 January 1950 – 24 December 2022) was an Australian rules footballer. He played for Footscray and South Melbourne/Sydney in the Victorian Football League (VFL) between 1969 and 1985, serving as the Swans' captain during the club's relocation to Sydney.

Following his VFL retirement, Round played and coached Williamstown in the Victorian Football Association (VFA) between 1986 and 1993. He was inducted into the Australian Football Hall of Fame in 2001.

== History ==
Round played for Footscray and South Melbourne/Sydney in the Victorian Football League (VFL) between 1969 and 1985. He played 328 games (135 for Footscray and 193 for South Melbourne/Sydney), won a Brownlow Medal in 1981 (tying with his former teammate Bernie Quinlan) and was the Swans' first captain during the Sydney era.

After retirement from VFL football, Round played and coached for several years for Williamstown in the Victorian Football Association, the second-highest level of football in Victoria, where he participated in their 1986 and captain-coached their 1990 premiership teams. He won the association best and fairest award, the J. J. Liston Trophy, in 1987 and won the 1990 Norm Goss Memorial Medal for best on field in the Grand Final.

Round captained the Williamstown Football Club in the 1989–1991 seasons, and he coached the club from 1989 to 1993. During his short time at the club, Round won 3 consecutive Gerry Callahan Medals (Williamstown best and fairest award) between 1987 and 1989. In 2009, Barry Round was named in the Williamstown Team of the Century in the Ruck Position. In May 2014, Williamstown FC held their 150-year celebration and inducted Round as part of their inaugural Hall of Fame team. On the same night, he was elevated to Legend status at the club, being one of only five players to receive the honour.

In 2001, Round was inducted into the Australian Football Hall of Fame with a citation that read: "Lion-hearted big man who represented Footscray and Sydney with distinction". He was also a member of Sydney's Team of the Century, which was announced in 2003.

In 2005, Round appeared on The AFL Footy Show's singing competition, "Screamers".

Barry Round died from organ failure on 24 December 2022, at age 72. His son is David Round, who won the Williamstown best and fairest award in 1999.

== Career highlights ==
=== Playing career ===
- 1969–1985 (games: 328, goals: 293)
- Footscray 1969–1975 (games: 135, goals: 136)
- South Melbourne/Sydney 1976–1985 (games: 193, goals: 157)

=== Player honours ===
- Brownlow Medal 1981
- Liston Trophy 1987
- South Melbourne/Sydney best and fairest 1979, 1981
- South Melbourne/Sydney captain 1980–1984
- South Melbourne/Sydney Team of the Century
- VFL representative (8 games, 4 goals)
- VFA representative (3 games, 4 goals)
