= Ian Fleming (disambiguation) =

Ian Fleming (1908–1964) was a British author, creator of James Bond.

Ian Fleming may also refer to:

- Ian Fleming (actor) (1888–1969), Australian character actor
- Ian Fleming (chemist) (born 1935), English chemist
- Ian Fleming (cricketer) (1908–1988), English cricketer
- Ian Fleming (footballer) (born 1953), Scottish footballer
- Ian Fleming (Australian footballer, born 1909) (1909–1984), Australian rules football player for Fitzroy
- Ian Fleming (Australian footballer, born 1937), Australian rules football player for Footscray

== See also ==
- Iain Fleming, CFL player in the 2005 CFL draft
- Ian Fleming International Airport, a Jamaican airport, named after the author
- Ian Fleming Publications, a production company that administers all of the author's works
- CWA Ian Fleming Steel Dagger, an award for thriller novels, sponsored by the author's estate
- Fleming (disambiguation)
