= Sonn =

Sonn is a surname. Notable people with the surname include:

- Caren Sonn (born 1968), German hurdler
- Christopher Sonn (born 1967), Australian social psychologist
- Claudia Sonn (born 1966), German footballer
- Franklin Sonn (1939–2025), South African diplomat
- Percy Sonn (1949–2007), South African lawyer and cricket administrator
- Philipp Sonn (born 2004), German footballer
- Ralf Sonn (born 1967), German high jumper
- Tamara Sonn, American academic in Islamic and religious studies

== See also ==
- Sonn., taxonomic author abbreviation of Pierre Sonnerat (1748–1814), French naturalist
