= Rod O'Connor =

Rod O'Connor may refer to:

- Rod O'Connor (footballer) (born 1948), Australian rules footballer
- Rod O'Connor (announcer) (1914–1964), American radio and television announcer

== See also ==
- Roderic O'Connor (disambiguation)
