= Orkhontuul =

District in Selenge Province, Mongolia

Coordinates: 48°49′48″N 104°48′30″E

Orkhontuul District Орхонтуул сум ᠣᠷᠬᠤᠨᠲᠤᠤᠯᠠᠰᠤᠮᠤ
- District
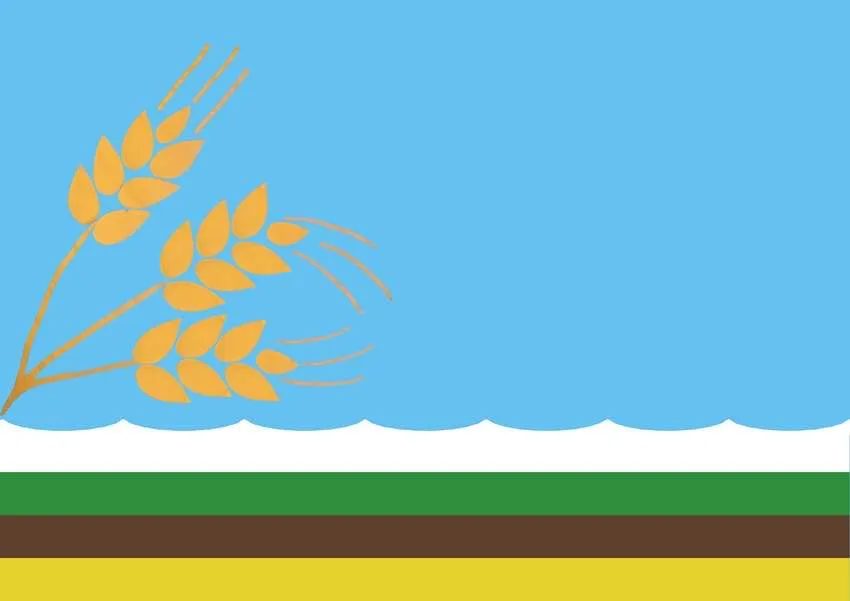
- Flag
- Interactive map of Orkhontuul District
- Country: Mongolia
- Province: Selenge Province

Area
  - Total: 2,940.83 km^{2} (1,135.46 sq mi)
- Time zone: UTC+8 (Ulaanbaatar Time)

Orkhontuul (Mongolian: Орхонтуул) is a sum (district) of Selenge Province in northern Mongolia. In 2008, its population was 2,952.

== Administrative divisions ==
The district is divided into three bags, which are:

- Bayantsogt
- Khongor-Ovoo
- Rashaant

== Notable natives ==
- Sukhbold Sukhee, diplomat
