= Godfrey Goldin =

Australian rules footballer (1919–1943)

Personal information
- Full name: Godfrey Robert Goldin
- Born: 10 June 1919; Abbotsford, Victoria
- Died: 7 February 1943 (aged 23); Territory of New Guinea
- Original team: Coburg Amateurs
- Position: Rover

Playing career^{1}
Years	Club	Games (Goals)
1939	Essendon	8 (6)
- ^{1} Playing statistics correct to the end of 1939.

Godfrey Robert Goldin (10 June 1919 – 7 February 1943) was a champion schoolboy Australian rules footballer who also played with Essendon in the Victorian Football League (VFL).

He died of wounds sustained in action while serving with the Second AIF in New Guinea during World War II.

== Family ==
The son of Robert Vane Goldin (1886-1969), and Ellen Christina Goldin (1890-1973), née Graham, Godfrey Robert Goldin was born on 10 June 1919.

He was engaged to Grace Lillian Osborne in September 1942. They never married.

His younger brother, Allan "Dick" Goldin, played 104 games in six seasons (1947 to 1952) for the Preston Football Club in the Victorian Football Association (VFA). He later coached Preston Seconds.

== Football ==
=== East Coburg State School ===
He was a champion schoolboy footballer, he played for the East Coburg State School team (coached by Jack Baggott, and represented Victoria in the 1933 Inter-State Schoolboys' Australian Rules Carnival in Brisbane.

=== Coburg Amateurs ===
He played for the Coburg Amateurs team that won the D Grade premiership in 1936.

=== Essendon (VFL) ===
Recruited by Essendon in 1937, he played a season with Essendon's Second XVIII before making his debut against North Melbourne on 27 May 1939.

With his early preseason training restricted by illness and injury, Goldin played several games with the Second XVIII in 1940.

== Cricket ==
He played for Preston Cricket Club in the Victorian Sub-District Cricket Association.

== Military service ==
He enlisted in the Second AIF on 11 March 1941.

== Death ==
Having served in the North Africa, he died in New Guinea on 7 February 1943 of wounds he had sustained fighting against the Japanese in the Battle of Wau.

He was buried at the Port Moresby (Bomana) War Cemetery.

== See also ==
- List of Victorian Football League players who died on active service
