= Jim Greenham =

Australian rules footballer, born 1915

Personal information
- Full name: James Arthur Greenham
- Born: 16 November 1915
- Died: 20 June 1993 (aged 77)
- Original team: Footscray Tech Old Boys
- Height: 183 cm (6 ft 0 in)
- Weight: 76 kg (168 lb)

Playing career^{1}
Years	Club	Games (Goals)
1937–41, 1943–45	Footscray	79 (47)
- ^{1} Playing statistics correct to the end of 1945.

James Arthur Greenham (16 November 1915 – 20 June 1993) was an Australian rules footballer who played with Footscray in the Victorian Football League (VFL).
