= Dick Eason =

Australian rules footballer (1913–1979)

- Born: Richard Thomas Eason; 20 November 1913; Geelong, Victoria
- Died: 13 November 1979 (aged 65); Sandringham, Victoria
- Military career
- Allegiance: Australia
- Branch: Citizen Military Forces; Second Australian Imperial Force
- Service years: 1937–1968
- Rank: Brigadier
- Commands: 22nd Field Regiment (1954–57)
- Conflicts: Second World War; Western Desert campaign; Operation Compass; Battle of Greece; Battle of Crete; New Guinea campaign; Aitape–Wewak campaign
- Awards: Military Cross; Efficiency Decoration
Australian rules football career
Personal information
- Original team: Footscray TSOB (VAFA)
- Height: 178 cm (5 ft 10 in)
- Weight: 71 kg (157 lb)
Playing career^{1}
Years	Club	Games (Goals)
1935–37	Footscray	25 (21)
1937	Essendon	2 (0)
Total		27 (21)
- ^{1} Playing statistics correct to the end of 1937.

Brigadier Richard Thomas Eason, MC, ED (20 November 1913 – 13 November 1979) was a senior Australian Army officer and an Australian rules footballer who played with Footscray and Essendon in the Victorian Football League (VFL).

== Family ==
The son of Alexander 'Alec' Eason (1889–1956) and Sarah Isabel "Sadie" Eason (1885–1950), née Huggett, Richard Thomas Eason was born in Geelong on 20 November 1913. His father, Alec, and his uncle, William Eason (1882–1957), were both VFL players and VFL coaches.

Eason married Mary Hemingway in 1939. They had three children.

== Football ==
Having trained with Footscray in the 1934 pre-season, Eason was cleared to Footscray from the Footscray Technical School Old Boys Football Club in the Victorian Amateur Football Association on 26 April 1935.

One of four players granted a "surprise clearance" from Footscray on 22 June 1937, Eason was granted a permit by the VFL to transfer to Essendon on 23 June 1937. He played in a number of Second XVIII matches for Essendon, and played in two First XVIII matches: against Melbourne, at the MCG, on 17 July 1937, and in the last home-and-away match of the 1937 season, against South Melbourne, at the Lake Oval, on 28 August 1937, as a replacement for the injured Elton Plummer.

Eason received a permit to return to play for the Footscray TSOB Football Club in the VAFA on 24 April 1939.

== Military service ==
Eason enlisted in the Second Australian Imperial Force in November 1939 and served in Libya, Greece, Crete and later Papua New Guinea during the Second World War. He was awarded the Military Cross for "outstanding courage and coolness" at Arohemi, near Wewak, in East Sepik Province, New Guinea, on 5 March 1945 when he went within 50 metres of the enemy to bring artillery fire to bear. He fought in a grenade battle against Japanese troops for 12 hours, during which 11 of his escort party were killed or wounded.

After the war Eason went on to become a brigadier in Citizen Military Forces.

== Country Fire Authority ==
On 1 September 1965 he was appointed for a five-year term as the first permanent Chairman of the Country Fire Authority, and was re-appointed, for a second five-year term, on 1 September 1970.

== Death ==
He died at Sandringham, Victoria on 13 November 1979.
