= Campbell Rose =

Former Australian businessman, sporting administrator and yachtsman

Campbell Alan Rose AM (born 7 November 1964) was the Chief Executive of VicTrack, the Victorian state government statutory authority responsible for managing the state's railway and tram based assets. Previously, he was Chief Executive for Stralliance Developments and Watersun Homes, a Melbourne-based development and construction company.

Campbell was previously the Chief Executive of the Western Bulldogs for a period of more than 8 years, after returning to Melbourne from Brisbane where he was running the 2001 Goodwill Games as Chief Executive.

Campbell is an accomplished sailor and was an Australian Olympian (yachting).

== Education ==
In 1985, Rose received his Bachelor of Applied Science (Hons) Degree in Physical Education and Recreation from the Victoria University of Technology. In 2005, he was bestowed with an Honorary Doctorate by Victoria University for Sports Achievements in the western region of Melbourne including his services to sport, sports administration and the community.

Rose completed his HSC at Melbourne Grammar School in 1982.

== Sporting career ==
In 1982 Campbell was a member of the victorious Head of the River crew for Melbourne Grammar School (5th seat), where he was also Vice Captain of the first XV Rugby team, where he played as loose head forward. He played in the Victorian School Boys Rugby Team at the International Series in New Zealand in 1980 before devoting more time to his love of yachting.

His achievements there span from 1979 to 1995 and highlights include being the Australian Representative in the Finn Dinghy Class at the inaugural Goodwill Games in Russia in 1986. He also participated as a crew member of Steak and Kidney for the America's Cup Defence Series in Perth in 1986, and as a team member (alternative helmsman) for the Australian Olympic Yachting Team at the Olympic Games in Seoul in 1988.

== Business career ==
Capitalising on his sporting successes and combined with his entrepreneurial skills, Campbell moved to managing specific sporting events, firstly as Sports and Recreational Marketing Manager for the Victorian Health Promotion Foundation (part of the Victorian Government) in 1989 and from 1990 - 1994 as executive director of the Victorian Yachting Council, now Yachting Victoria. In this role he held various positions with the Australian Yachting Federation, now Yachting Australia, and the International Yacht Racing Union, now the International Sailing Federation (ISAF).

From 1995 to 1997, Campbell held the position as Chief Executive of the Melbourne Major Events Company Limited, which was responsible for many international concerts, festivals and international sporting championships and events being brought to Melbourne and Victoria for the first time. The success of the Melbourne Major Events Company was an integral part of repositioning Melbourne as a liveable city, and a city that is internationally recognised as a major sporting and events capital. The procurement of these events heavily drove Victoria's economic recovery and infrastructure development, particularly around public amenity and sporting facilities.

A move to the position as Chief Executive of the Melbourne 2006 Commonwealth Games Bid, working with Ron Walker, Bid Chairman, saw the company successful in its bid for the Commonwealth Games to be held in Melbourne in 2006.

Campbell moved to Brisbane in early 1999, as Chief Executive of the 2001 Goodwill Games - The Ted Turner initiative to bring the world's best athletes together to compete in good will. This was the most successful games held from a financial perspective.

In August 2002, Campbell joined the Western Bulldogs, AFL Football Club as Chief Executive. The financial and operational problems of the Bulldogs were well documented.

After announcing a $3 million loss within two months of arriving, Campbell endeavored to transform the football club into a sustainable, community-oriented football club that would serve the needs of the western region of Melbourne. The club has yet to win a premiership flag since its first flag in 1foundbut Campbell's tenure saw a $32.5 million Whitten Oval Redevelopment (the home of the Western Bulldogs) and a substantial increase in members. The club announced a small operating loss of $280,000 in financial year 2006. In the last 3 years of Campbell's tenure, he returned the club to healthy profits in excess of $1 million (EBTD) and a record membership of over 37,500 adult members.

In December 2010, Campbell resigned as Chief Executive of the Western Bulldogs to take up the role at Stralliance Developments.

In 2012, Campbell was recruited to the position of Chief Executive of VicTrack commencing in February 2013. www.victrack.com.au

Other present and past appointments include the Melbourne Recital Centre, Victoria University Foundation, Early Childhood Management Services - a not-for-profit community childcare provider, Australia New Zealand Melanoma Trials Group, Founding Chairman of Australian Melanoma Consumer Alliance, and Founding Chairman Melbourne Melanoma Project Consumer Reference Group. Other appointments have also included: State Boating Council, Victorian Olympic Council Board, World Sailing Championship Management Board, International Sailing Federation and the Marine Board of Victoria.

In 2018, Campbell inaugurated the Prime Ministers' Sporting Oration, an annual event in which a former Prime Minister delivers a speech which aims to inspire the nation through the common language of Australia: sport. The purpose of the Prime Ministers’ Sporting Oration is to raise funds for the benefit of grassroots and community sport – allocated to key cause areas nominated for that year.

In 2022, Rose was put on extended leave from his role as CEO of VicTrack after the collapse of VicTrack project Eloque Pty Ltd, of which Campbell was also the CEO. VicTrack ordered Rose to cease contact with current and former VicTrack staff.

In 2023, Rose's conduct at both Eloque and VicTrack were questioned by the Victorian Government's Auditor-General's Office, where the performance and conduct of the CEO was brought into disrepute.

The Auditor-General's report found that Rose had spent ten months simultaneously acting as CEO of both VicTrack and Eloque, creating undisclosed conflicts of interest. The report found that Rose had overseen plans for a remuneration and equity scheme from which he personally would have benefited, without disclosing this arrangement. VicTrack chair Geraldine Gray stated in a formal response that the organisation's trust in Rose to commercialise the technology was misplaced and that his conduct was unacceptable. Rose disputed the findings, stating the Auditor-General's conclusions were fundamentally flawed and based on incomplete materials. Following 12 months of unexplained leave, Rose departed VicTrack in early 2023 after the collapse of the Eloque venture.

== Personal ==
Campbell has 4 children. Campbell has 3 older sisters and a younger brother. His brother, Philip Rose, until 2011, was managing director of leading fastening company Powers Fasteners.
