= Alec Eason =

Australian rules footballer (1889–1956)

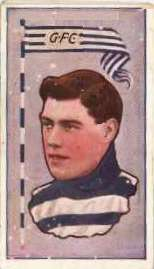
- Cigarette card of Eason in 1912

Personal information
- Full name: Alexander Eason
- Born: 8 November 1889; Geelong, Victoria
- Died: 5 May 1956 (aged 66); Geelong, Victoria
- Original team: Barwon
- Debut: Round 12, 1909, Geelong vs. Essendon, at Corio Oval
- Height: 175 cm (5 ft 9 in)
- Weight: 78 kg (172 lb)

Playing career^{1}
Years	Club	Games (Goals)
1909–1915	Geelong	112 (57)
1916	Richmond	12 (8)
1919–1921	Geelong	38 (23)
Total		162 (88)

Coaching career
Years	Club	Games (W–L–D)
1920	Geelong	16 (5–11–0)
1929	Footscray	18 (6–11–1)
Total		34 (11–22–1)
- ^{1} Playing statistics correct to the end of 1921.

Career highlights
- Geelong Best & Fairest 1915; Geelong Hall of Fame and Team of the Century

Alexander Eason (8 November 1889 – 5 May 1956) was an Australian rules football player, coach and administrator in the Victorian Football League and Victorian Football Association.

== Family ==
The seventh of the eight children of Richard Alexander Eason (1842–1909), and Annabella Bayfield Eason (1845–1921), née Sisson, Alexander Eason was born at Geelong, Victoria on 8 November 1889.

He married Sarah Isobel Huggett (1885–1950) in 1911. They had eight children.

One of his brothers, William Eason (1882–1957), played for, and coached Geelong in the VFL; another of his brothers, George Alexander Eason (1882–1957), was due to play for Geelong in its Finals match against St Kilda on 9 September 1899, but died as the consequence of a ruptured liver sustained in a football match, when playing for the Barwon Football Club, on the preceding Saturday; and his son, Richard Thomas Eason (1913–1979), played with both Footscray and Essendon in the VFL.

== Football ==
Eason was a talented and hard-working player, nicknamed "Bunny" because of his speed. His accuracy with both kicking (particularly stab-kicking) and handpassing were highly regarded, as was his ability to win the ball from either his or his opponents' ruck tap-outs, and he was considered one of the finest rovers in Victoria in the early 1920s. He had two fingers on his right hand missing, but this did not greatly affect his skill. A highly regarded rover, Eason played most of his football for the Geelong Football Club, playing a total of 150 games for the club between 1909 and 1921. His time at Geelong was broken up by World War I: upon Geelong's withdrawal from the league in 1916, he crossed to Richmond and played twelve games there, before enlisting and serving in the war for the next two years. He returned to play for Geelong from 1919 until 1921, earning selection for Victoria in interstate football during that time.

In 1922, Eason crossed to Footscray in the VFA without a clearance, and played there until 1924, continuing to earn high acclaim and winning two premierships; he received £12 per week at Footscray, with the Sporting Globe reporting that he was the highest paid footballer at that time. In 1925, when Footscray joined the VFL, Eason was unable to remain with the club due to his suspension from the VFL for leaving Geelong without a clearance, and he crossed to Brighton for the final year of his senior career.

He later coached Footscray in the VFL for the 1929 season, Ballarat Imperial in 1932 and Prahran in the latter part of the 1933 season. He became an administrator at Footscray, serving as chairman of selectors. He was well-regarded for his on-field and off-field wit, and wrote columns for the Sporting Globe.

== Recognition ==
He is a member of Geelong's Hall of Fame and was named on the interchange bench of the club's Team of the Century.

== Death ==
He died (suddenly) at Geelong on 5 May 1956, and was buried at the Footscray General Cemetery.
