= Victoria University (Australia) =

Dual-sector public research university based in Melbourne, Victoria, Australia

Coordinates: 37°47′39″S 144°54′0″E

- Former names: List: Footscray Technical School (1916–1958); Footscray Technical College (1958–1968); Footscray Institute of Technology (1968–1990); Victoria University of Technology (1992–2005)
- Motto: The Door of Opportunity
- Type: Public research university
- Established: 1916 (antecedent); 1992 (as university)
- Accreditation: TEQSA
- Budget: A$556,392 million (2025)
- Visitor: Governor of Victoria
- Chancellor: Steve Bracks
- Vice-Chancellor: Adam Shoemaker
- Total staff: 2,563 (2025)
- Students: 52,656 (2025)
- Undergraduates: 17,044 (EFTSL, 2025)
- Postgraduates: 7,310 coursework (EFTSL, 2025); 163 research (EFTSL, 2025)
- Other students: 13,085 (VET) (2025); 117 other (EFTSL, 2025)
- Location: Melbourne, Victoria, Australia
- Campus: Urban with multiple sites
Colours
Blue, white and black
- Nickname: Vultures
- Sporting affiliations: UniSport; EAEN; UBL
- Mascot: Vulture
- Website: www.vu.edu.au
- "2025 Annual Report"= https://www.vu.edu.au/sites/default/files/documents/2026-05/vu-2025-annual-report.pdf

Victoria University (VU or Vic Uni) is an Australian public research university based in Melbourne, Victoria. It is a dual-sector university, providing courses in both higher education and technical and further education (TAFE).

The university has several campuses in Melbourne Central Business District, Melbourne Western Region, Sydney, Brisbane, as well as Online.

== History ==
The idea for a technical school based in the western suburbs of Melbourne was first proposed in 1910. The Footscray Technical School opened its doors to 220 students and 9 teachers in 1916 after five years of fundraising.

Charles Archibald Hoadley was the school's principal from its founding until his death in 1947. Under Hoadley's leadership, the school expanded and began offering trade certificate courses, diplomas in architecture, building, and contracting, as well as evening classes. War and the Depression saw a dip in student numbers. However, by 1943, there were 2500 students enrolled in courses taught at the Footscray Park and Footscray Nicholson campuses.

The following decades saw gender and cultural shifts. In 1958, the school changed its name to the Footscray Technical College. Ten years later, it changed its name again, this time, to the Footscray Institute of Technology (FIT). Women first enrolled in day diploma courses in 1960, and changes to the federal government's immigration policy resulted in many more European and Asian students entering the school. The secondary school component, now known as Footscray City College, was separated from the rest of the institute in 1972. By the mid-1970s, the expanded curriculum included degree courses and was well beyond the technical focus of the original Footscray Technical School. Further changes occurred in the 1980s, with the technical and trade education section separating from FIT to form the Footscray and Newport Colleges of TAFE.

In 1990, FIT merged with the Western Institute, which had been founded three years earlier to provide TAFE and higher education courses to the outlying suburbs in western Melbourne. It was established as a university by the Victoria University of Technology Act 1990 (No. 21 of 1990) as Victoria University of Technology (VUT). The university further amalgamation with the Western Melbourne Institute of TAFE in 1998. In 2005, the Victoria University of Technology Act 1990 was amended to rename the university as Victoria University, reflecting the development of its teaching and research.

The institutions that combined to form VU include:

- Footscray Technical School, renamed Footscray Technical College and later Footscray Institute of Technology
- Newport Technical College, renamed Newport College of TAFE
- Melbourne School of Hairdressing
- School of Painting, Decorating and Sign Crafts
- Melbourne Technical College of Hairdressing
- Melbourne College of Decoration
- Footscray College of TAFE
- Flagstaff College of TAFE
- Western Institute
- Gellibrand College of TAFE, renamed Western Metropolitan College of TAFE
- Western Melbourne Institute of TAFE
- Victoria University of Technology
- Victoria Polytechnic

== Campuses and buildings ==
Victoria University has campuses located throughout Melbourne's western region and the city centre. The new VU City Tower will be Melbourne's tallest vertical campus. One campus is located in central Sydney.

VU courses are also delivered by partner institutes throughout Asia, including in China, India, Malaysia, and Sri Lanka. Some of the university's largest partners are Sunway University College in Malaysia, NSBM Green University in Sri Lanka and Liaoning University in China.

=== Footscray Park ===
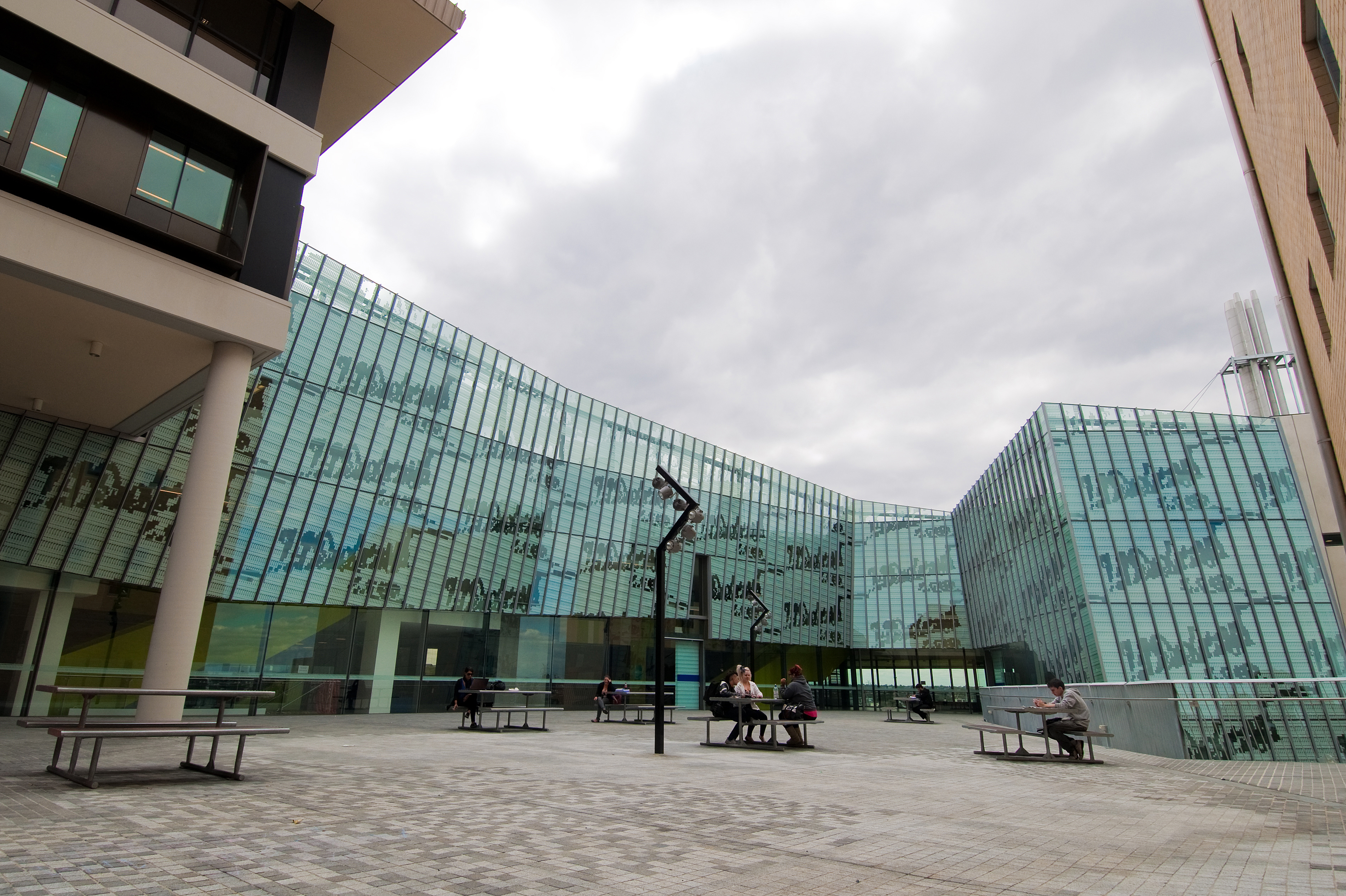
Victoria University Footscray Park Campus – Building P

Footscray Park Campus on Ballarat Road, Footscray is the university's main campus and administrative centre. It offers higher education courses primarily in engineering, education and sport-related disciplines. It occupies a 7-hectare (17-acre) site overlooking Flemington Racecourse and the Maribyrnong River. The A$68.5 million sport and learning precinct, including sport and exercise science research labs, was completed in early 2011. The campus also has a 25-metre swimming pool and a childcare centre.

=== St Albans ===
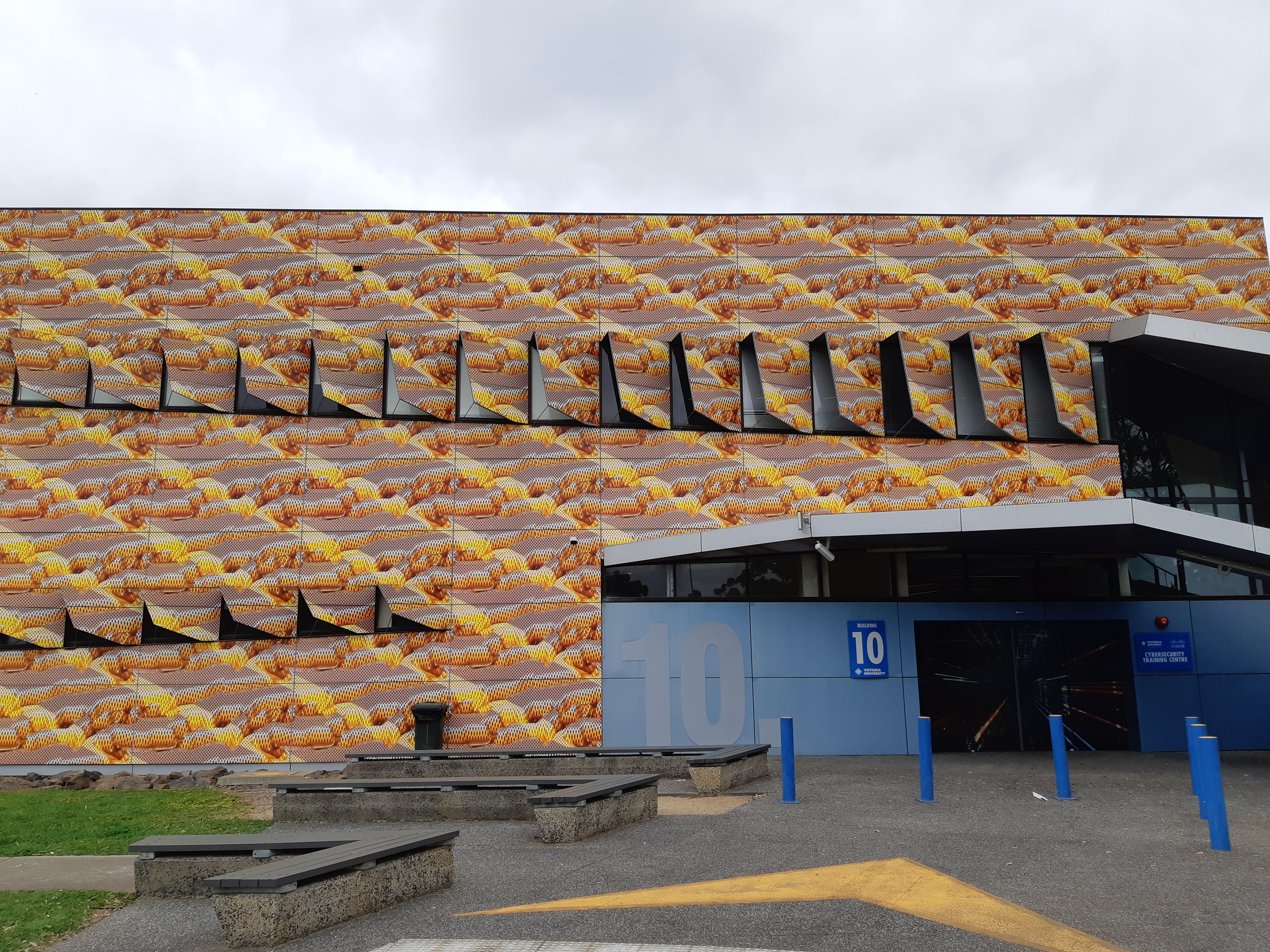
St Albans VU Campus

St Albans Campus on McKechnie Street, St Albans, is the university's health and education hub, with a focus on psychology, nursing, arts, and paramedic and biomedical sciences. It is set on 32 hectares (79 acres) of native grasslands and sugar gums. The new St Albans Health and Fitness Centre was opened in 2013.

=== Footscray Nicholson ===
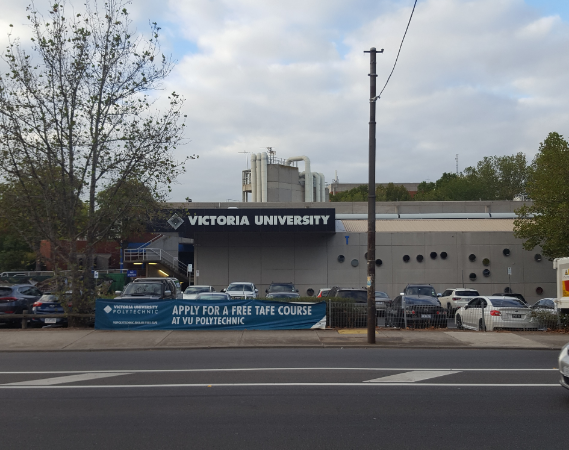
Victoria University Footscray Nicholson Campus – Building T as viewed from Buckley Street

Footscray Nicholson Campus is in central Footscray, on the corner of Nicholson and Buckley Streets. It delivers TAFE, VCE and short courses. Its new learning commons was opened in 2012 offering a broad range of educational and student services.

=== City ===
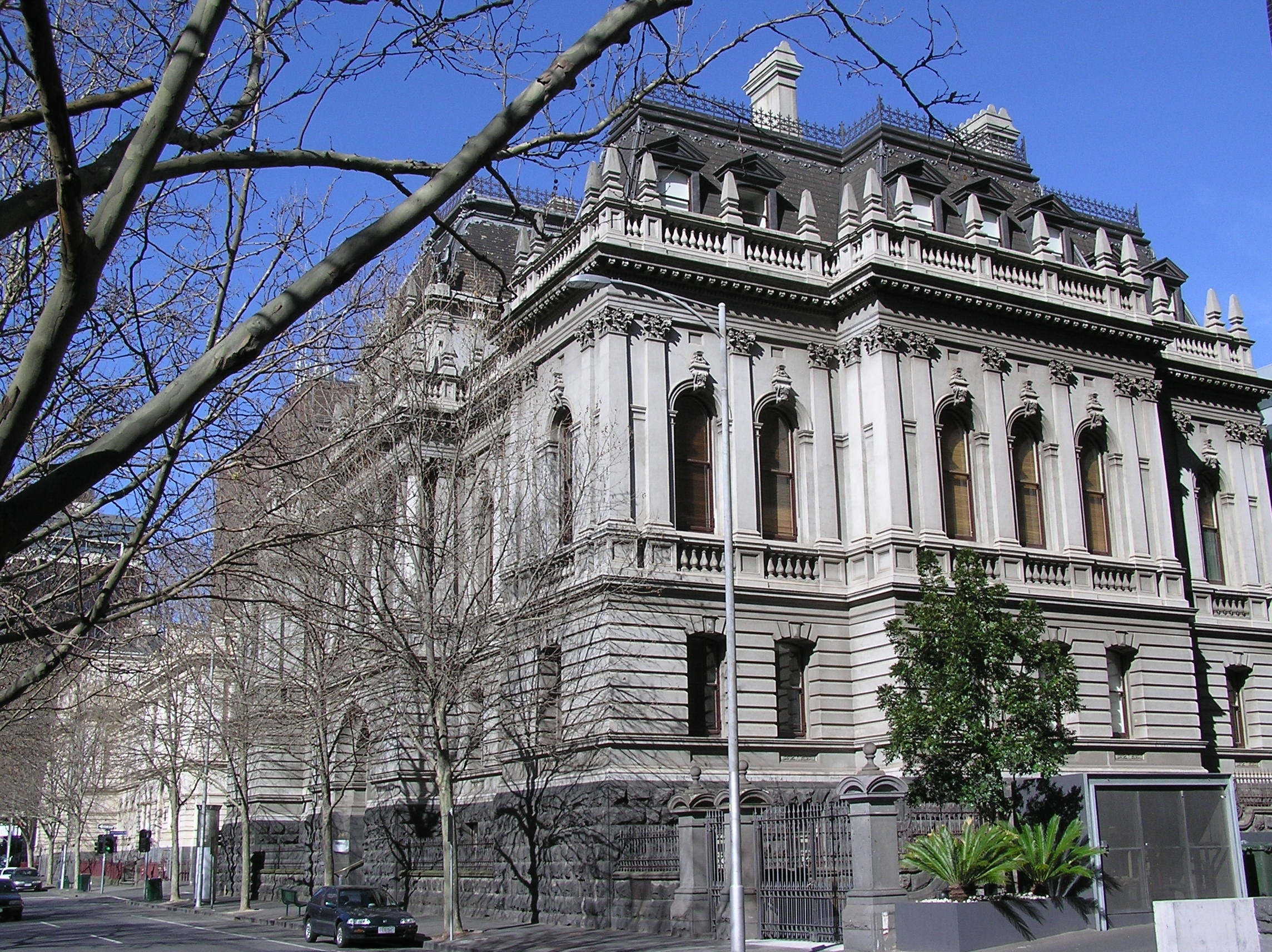
Victoria University City Campus on Queen Street

The City Campus includes the VU City Tower and the law building at 295 Queen Street in the heart of Melbourne's legal precinct. The campus houses business courses, Osteopathy, a hair and beauty salon as well as the university's College of Law and Justice, a law library, the Sir Zelman Cowen Centre and two moot courts. It offers undergraduate and postgraduate law courses, including continuing legal education courses for legal professionals.

=== Werribee ===
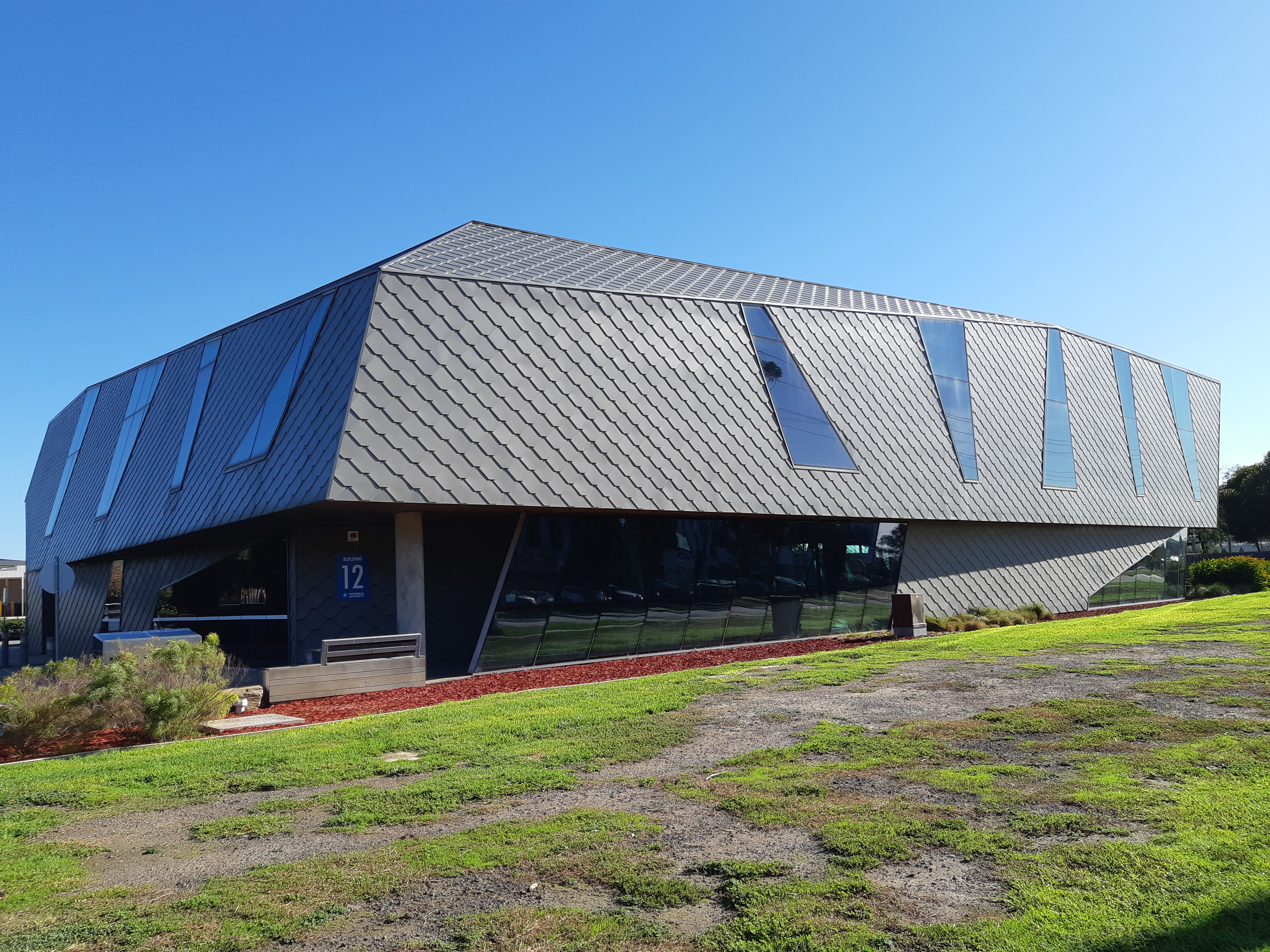
VU Werribee Campus

The 16-hectare (40-acre) Werribee Campus is located in the Werribee agricultural research and tertiary education precinct. It offers trades training as well as facilities for water, food and fire safety research.

=== Sunshine ===
The Sunshine Campus of Victoria Polytechnic is located on Ballarat Road, Sunshine. It offers TAFE courses, focusing mainly on business and the construction industries. The A$44 million high-technology Construction Hub was opened in 2013 for building and construction training. The campus also has a convention centre with a 200-seat auditorium.

=== Sydney ===
Victoria University delivers a number of business courses for international students at its campus in central Sydney, which operates in partnership with the Education Centre of Australia (ECA).

=== Whitten Oval ===
In late 2010, VU opened an A$8 million Sport and Recreation Learning Centre in partnership with the Western Bulldogs at the Whitten Oval in West Footscray. The Centre contains massage therapy clinics open to the public, as well as a 140-seat lecture theatre, a library, classrooms and offices.

== Governance and structures ==
=== Academic structure ===
Several of the university's colleges offer internationally recognised qualifications ranging from certificates and diplomas to degrees, postgraduate certificates and diplomas, and masters and doctoral research degrees (PhD). Victoria Polytechnic and VU College offer vocational education courses and higher education diplomas. These are divided between several colleges, including:

- The College of Arts and Education
- The College of Business
- The College of Engineering and Science
- The College of Health and Bio-medicine
- The College of Law and Justice
- The College of Sport and Exercise Science
- Victoria University Polytechnic, which is the TAFE division of Victoria University.

== Academic profile ==
=== Tuition, loans and financial aid ===
For international students starting in 2025, tuition fees range from A$14,900 to A$20,000 per semester for higher education programs at the diploma level or above. Domestic students (Note: According to the Higher Education Support Act 2003, domestic students include permanent residents and New Zealand citizens in addition to Australian citizens.) may be offered a federally-subsidised Commonwealth Supported Place (CSP) which substantially decreases the student contribution amount billed to the student. The maximum student contribution amount limits that can be applied to CSP students are dependent on the field of study.

Since 2021, Commonwealth Supported Places have also been limited to 7 years of equivalent full-time study load (EFTSL), calculated in the form of Student Learning Entitlement (SLE). Students may accrue additional SLE under some circumstances (e.g. starting a separate one-year honours program) or every 10 years. Domestic students are also able to access the HECS-HELP student loans scheme offered by the federal government. These are indexed to the Consumer or Wage Price Index, whichever is lower, and repayments are voluntary unless the recipient passes an income threshold.

The university also offers several scholarships, which come in the form of bursaries or tuition fee remission.

=== Academic reputation ===
University rankings

Global – Overall
- CWTS World: 1030 (Note: The CWTS Leiden Ranking is based on P (top 10%).) (2024)
- QS World: 741–750 (2026)
- THE World: 501–600 (2026)
- USNWR Global: =785 (25/26)

National – Overall
- CWTS National: 29 (2024)
- ERA National: 29 (2018)
- QS National: 32 (2026)
- THE National: 33–35 (2026)
- USNWR National: 28 (25/26)
- AFR National: =34 (2025)

National publications

In the Australian Financial Review Best Universities Ranking 2025, the university was tied #34 amongst Australian universities.

Global publications

In the 2026 Quacquarelli Symonds World University Rankings (published 2025), the university attained a position of #741–750 (32nd nationally).

In the Times Higher Education World University Rankings 2026 (published 2025), the university attained a position of #601–600 (tied 33–35th nationally).

In the 2025–2026 U.S. News & World Report Best Global Universities, the university attained a tied position of #785 (28th nationally).

In the CWTS Leiden Ranking 2024, the university attained a position of #1030 (29th nationally).

=== Student outcomes ===
The Australian Government's QILT (Note: Abbreviation for Quality Indicators for Learning and Teaching.) conducts national surveys documenting the student life cycle from enrolment through to employment. These surveys place more emphasis on criteria such as student experience, graduate outcomes and employer satisfaction than perceived reputation, research output and citation counts.

In the 2023 Employer Satisfaction Survey, graduates of the university had an overall employer satisfaction rate of 85.5%.

In the 2023 Graduate Outcomes Survey, graduates of the university had a full-time employment rate of 64.5% for undergraduates and 84.9% for postgraduates. The initial full-time salary was A$69,400 for undergraduates and A$93,900 for postgraduates.

In the 2023 Student Experience Survey, undergraduates at the university rated the quality of their entire educational experience at 81.2% meanwhile postgraduates rated their overall education experience at 75.5%.

=== Research and publications ===
28 VU research disciplines were ranked at or above world standard in the Excellence in Research Australia (ERA) assessments 2018.

== Student life ==
=== Student demographics ===
In 2025, VU had 52,565 students., including 17,044 undergraduate students, 7,310 postgraduate (by coursework), and 13,085 TAFE students. Of these students, 13,589 were international students studying at one of VU's Melbourne, Sydney or Brisbane Campuses.

=== Student accommodation ===
VU owns and operates student accommodation for students, staff, and guests of the university. In February 2016, the Student Village in Maidstone was replaced with the newly built UniLodge Victoria University, a 13-story apartment building across the road from the Footscray Park Campus on Ballarat Road, Footscray.

International House, a traditional residential college located at the University of Melbourne, also offers places to Victoria University students.

== Notable people ==
=== Notable alumni ===
- Ali Abdo, Olympic wrestler
- Liam Adams, long-distance running champion
- Ngconde Balfour, former South African sport and recreation minister
- Ron Barassi, Australian Football League legend
- Nathan Brown, former AFL player and commentator
- Marion May Campbell, author and associate professor of Professional and Creative Writing at Deakin University
- Doug Chappel, comedian and actor
- Jeffrey Cheah, founder of the Sunway Group
- Simon Garlick, CEO of the Western Bulldogs
- Andrew Gaze, former basketballer
- Brad Green, former Melbourne footballer and current Carlton Football Club development coach
- Alwyn Jones, national champion triple jumper
- Alan Kohler, financial journalist
- Telmo Languiller, Victorian MP
- Tammy Lobato, Victorian MP
- Mike McKay, Olympian and member of the "Oarsome Foursome"
- Pia Miranda, actress
- Danny Morseu, first Torres Strait Islander to represent Australia at the Olympics
- Nyadol Nyuon, litigation lawyer and regular media commentator and advocate for South Sudanese community
- Campbell Rose, former CEO of the Western Bulldogs
- Larry Sengstock, former basketballer
- Sukhbold Sukhee, permanent representative to the United Nations for Mongolia
- Fatai Veamatahau, finalist in The Voice, 2012
- Deepak Vinayak, community leader, Melbourne
- Mitch Wallis, footballer, Western Bulldogs
- Kim Wells, Victoria State Government treasurer
- Ronald Wilkins, geochemist and poet
- Easton Wood, Western Bulldogs AFL premiership captain

=== Academics and staff ===
- Tony Birch, poet, novelist, author
- Peter Dixon, economist
- Craig Emerson, former Australian politician
- Gary Foley, Indigenous activist and historian
- Ian Gray, magistrate
- Michael Kirby, retired High Court judge
- Alan Kohler, financial journalist and editor
- Chris Maxwell, barrister
- Christopher Sonn, social psychologist
- Robert Stary, criminal law specialist

== See also ==
- Footscray Tech Old Boys
- VUT (football club)
- List of universities in Australia
