= Sukhbold Sukhee =

United Nations representative for Mongolia

Sukhbold Sukhee (born 30 October 1976) has been the Permanent Representative to the United Nations for Mongolia since 2015.

Sukhee was born in Orkhontuul, Selenge Province, Mongolia. He received a Bachelor of Public International Law at the Moscow State Institute of International Relations in 1999 and a Master of Business Administration from Victoria University, Australia, in 2006.

Sukhee became the Permanent Representative to the UN for Mongolia on 31 July 2015.
