= Coburg Amateurs Football Club =

Australian rules football club, 1920s–1988

Coburg Amateurs

Names
- Full name: Coburg Amateurs Football Club
- Nickname: Swans

1987 D Section season
- Home-and-away season: 10th

Club details
- Founded: 1920s
- Dissolved: 1988; 38 years ago
- Colours: Blue Red
- Competition: MJFL (1928−34); VAFA (1935−40; 1942−87); EDFL (1941)
- Premierships: VAFA A Section (1): 1969; VAFA B Section (2): 1955; 1963; VAFA C Section (2): 1937; 1952; VAFA D Section (2): 1936; 1981
- Ground: De Chene Reserve, Coburg

Uniforms
Home

The Coburg Amateurs Football Club, nicknamed the Swans, was an Australian rules football club based in the Melbourne suburb of Coburg.

The club's most successful period was the 1930s, where it won two premierships and was runners-up in another four grand finals. It won senior premierships in the Victorian Amateur Football Association (VAFA) in every decade that followed (excluding the 1940s), but struggled after 1982 and eventually folded in 1988.

== History ==
=== Early years ===
Coburg Amateurs was formed in the 1920s and first competed in the A Grade of the Northern District Football Association (NDFA) in 1928. The club made the finals series in 1929, but were defeated by Richmond United in the semi-final.

The NDFA was renamed to the Metropolitan Junior Football League (MJFL) in 1930, and Coburg was defeated by Richmond United in the grand final later that year. In 1931, Coburg defeated Richmond United in the semi-final, but was defeated by West Brunswick in the grand final.

In its final season in the MJFL, Coburg was defeated by South Kensington in the 1934 grand final.

=== VAFA ===
Coburg Amateurs logo in 1986

Coburg left the MJFL to join the Victorian Amateur Football Association (VAFA) in 1935. Its first VAFA premiership was won in D Section in 1936, which was followed by a C Section premiership in 1937.

After the VAFA suspended competition in 1940 because of the Second World War, Coburg joined the Essendon District Football League (EDFL) for the 1941 season. The club returned to VAFA affiliation in 1942 and resumed playing in 1946. The club also affiliated with Moreland Amateurs, which entered the VAFA in 1949.

Coburg made the 1970 A Section Grand Final, but despite being seen as favourites going into the match and finishing strongly, they were defeated by Caulfield Grammarians by two points.

In its final season in 1987, Coburg only won a single game, finishing last on the D Section ladder. The club went into recess before the 1988 season began, and folded shortly after.

== Honours ==
=== Premierships ===
Division	Level	Wins	Years won
A Section	Seniors	1	1969
A Section	Reserves	1	1976
B Section	Seniors	2	1955, 1963
C Section	Seniors	2	1937, 1952
C Section	Reserves	1	1982
D Section	Seniors	2	1936, 1981
D Section	Reserves	1	1981
Junior 2	Juniors	2	1973, 1979

=== Leading VAFA goalkickers ===
- 1968: Rod McFarlane − 54 goals (A Section)
- 1969: Rod McFarlane − 70 goals (A Section)
- 1970: Rod McFarlane − 105 goals (A Section)
- 1959: K. C. O'Brien − 41 goals (B Section)
- 1937: J. Plunkett − 99 goals (C Section)
- 1957: J. Brown − 67 goals (Junior Section)
- 1975: M. Egan − 82 goals (Junior Section)

== Seasons ==
Premiers	Grand Finalist	Minor premiers	Finals appearance	Wooden spoon	Division leading goalkicker	Division best and fairest

=== Seniors ===
Year	League	Division	Finish	W	L	D	Coach	Captain	Best and fairest	Leading goalkicker		Ref
1928	NDFA	A Grade										
1929	NDFA	A Grade										
1930	MJFL	A Grade										
1931	MJFL	A Grade										
1932	MJFL	A Grade										
1933	MJFL	A Grade										
1934	MJFL	A Grade										
1935	VAFA	D Section	4th									
1936	VAFA	D Section										
1937	VAFA	C Section	1st		0	0				J. Plunkett	99	
1938	VAFA	B Section					Stan McDonald					
1939	VAFA	A Section	4th									
1940	VAFA	A Section										
1941	EDFL											
1942	VAFA	(No season due to World War II)										
1943	VAFA	(No season due to World War II)										
1944	VAFA	(No season due to World War II)										
1945	VAFA	(No season due to World War II)										
1946	VAFA	A Section										
1947	VAFA	A Section	4th									
1948	VAFA	A Section										
1949	VAFA											
1950	VAFA											
1951	VAFA	B Section										
1952	VAFA	C Section										
1953	VAFA											
1954	VAFA	B Section	3rd									
1955	VAFA	B Section	1st									
1956	VAFA	A Section										
1957	VAFA											
1958	VAFA											
1959	VAFA	B Section	3rd							K. C. O'Brien	41	
1960	VAFA								I.J. Merrick			
1961	VAFA											
1962	VAFA	B Section	3rd									
1963	VAFA	B Section							Peter Scanlon			
1964	VAFA	A Section										
1965	VAFA	A Section										
1966	VAFA	A Section	3rd									
1967	VAFA	A Section					Alan Salter					
1968	VAFA	A Section					Alan Salter			Rod McFarlane	54	
1969	VAFA	A Section					Alan Salter		Norman Beattie	Rod McFarlane	70	
1970	VAFA	A Section					Alan Salter		Norman Beattie	Rod McFarlane	105	
1971	VAFA	A Section	4th				Alan Salter		John Douglas			
1972	VAFA	A Section	4th				Alan Salter					
1973	VAFA	A Section										
1974	VAFA	A Section	3rd									
1975	VAFA	A Section					Graham Warfe					
1976	VAFA	A Section										
1977	VAFA	A Section					Lance Riky	C. V. Cunningham				
1978	VAFA											
1979	VAFA											
1980	VAFA	C Section	9th	4	14	0						
1981	VAFA	D Section					Rod McFarlane					
1982	VAFA	C Section										
1983	VAFA	B Section	9th	6	12	0						
1984	VAFA	B Section	9th	4	14	0						
1985	VAFA	C Section	10th	4	14	0						
1986	VAFA	D Section	6th	9	8	1	John Taylor					
1987	VAFA	D Section	10th	1	17	0	John Maloney					

=== Grand finals ===
Premiers	Runners-up	Drawn

Year	League	Division	Grade	Opponent	Score	Venue	Date	Report
1930	MJFL	A Grade	Seniors	Richmond United	8.7 (55) d. 7.7 (49)		6 September 1930	
1931	MJFL	A Grade	Seniors	West Brunswick	7.12 (54) d. 4.8 (32)	Motordrome	10 October 1931	
1934	MJFL	A Grade	Seniors	South Kensington	7.11 (53) d. 3.10 (28)		September 1934	
1936	VAFA	D Section	Seniors	Footscray TSOB	18.19 (127) d. 15.8 (98)			
1937	VAFA	C Section	Seniors	Footscray TSOB	22.24 (156) d. 10.6 (66)			
1938	VAFA	B Section	Seniors	Old Melburnians	13.10 (88) d. 12.10 (82)			
1952	VAFA	C Section	Seniors	Elsternwick	7.16 (58) d. 4.11 (35)			
1955	VAFA	B Section	Seniors	Old Scotch	10.12 (72) d. 8.2 (50)			
1956	VAFA	A Section	Seniors	Ivanhoe	6.14 (50) d. 5.12 (42)			
1963	VAFA	B Section	Seniors	UHSOB	9.15 (69) d. 7.13 (55)			
1965	VAFA	A Section	Seniors	University Blacks	17.12 (114) d. 10.5 (65)			
1969	VAFA	A Section	Seniors	Ormond	13.17 (95) d. 12.12 (84)			
1970	VAFA	A Section	Seniors	Caulfield Grammarians	14.8 (102) d. 15.10 (100)			
1976	VAFA	D Section	Reserves	North Old Boys	12.18 (90) d. 7.13 (55)		18 September 1976	
1979	VAFA	Section 2	Juniors	Kew	14.15 (99) d. 11.15 (81)		15 September 1979	
1981	VAFA	D Section	Seniors	West Brunswick	17.12 (114) d. 3.4 (22)			
1981	VAFA	D Section	Reserves	West Brunswick	15.7 (97) d. 13.8 (86)			
1982	VAFA	C Section	Seniors	Old Camberwell	17.20 (122) d. 11.7 (73)			
1982	VAFA	C Section	Reserves	Hampton Rovers	12.8 (80) d. 10.7 (67)			

== Notable players ==
- Phil Cleary − Coburg VFA captain and coach in the 1980s
- Godfrey Goldin − champion schoolboy footballer
- Neil Rainbow − oldest Australian rules footballer as of 2024
- Alan Salter − 1972 VAFA representative coach
- Robert Walls − 259 VFL games with Carlton and Fitzroy
