= Max Isaac =

Australian rules footballer

Personal information
- Full name: Maxwell Vanstone Isaac
- Born: 1 May 1924; Ballarat, Victoria
- Died: 23 February 2011 (aged 86)
- Original team: Footscray Tech Old Boys
- Height: 175 cm (5 ft 9 in)
- Weight: 80 kg (176 lb)

Playing career^{1}
Years	Club	Games (Goals)
1947–50, 1952	Footscray	26 (10)
- ^{1} Playing statistics correct to the end of 1952.

Maxwell Vanstone Isaac (1 May 1924 – 23 February 2011) was an Australian rules footballer who played with Footscray in the Victorian Football League (VFL).
