= Footscray Tech Old Boys =

Names
- Full name: Footscray Institute of Technology Sports Club Inc.
- Former name(s): Footscray TSOB; Footscray TCOB
- Nickname(s): Footscray Tech, FITOB, FIT
- Former nickname(s): FTSOB, FTCOB

Club details
- Founded: 1920s
- Dissolved: 1992; 34 years ago
- Colours: Royal blue; Navy blue; Gold
- Competition: FDJFL (1931); VAFA (1932−92)
- Premierships: VAFA (4): 1953; 1959; 1968; 1983
- Ground: Institute Oval

The Footscray Tech Old Boys (FTOB), also known simply as Footscray, was an Australian rules football club based in the Melbourne suburb of Footscray. The club was formed by former students of Footscray Technical School (FTS).

Footscray Tech competed in the Victorian Amateur Football Association (VAFA) for most of its existence. The club disbanded in 1992 when Footscray IT merged into the Victoria University of Technology (VUT), with a VUT club competing in the VAFA for several years before it folded at the end of 1996.

The successor university to Footscray IT, Victoria University (VU), is currently represented in the VAFA by the UHS-VU Football Club.

== History ==
=== Footscray Tech ===
Footscray Technical School Old Boys Football Club (Footscray TSOB) was formed in the 1920s and competed in the Footscray District Junior Football League (FDJFL) in 1931. In 1932, the club joined the Metropolitan Amateur Football Association (MAFA, renamed VAFA in 1933) and entered the competition's D Section.

The club made its first grand final in 1936, but was defeated by Coburg Amateurs by 29 points. After being promoted to C Section for the 1937 season, the club made the grand final again, but was defeated by Coburg Amateurs for the second year in a row.

21 years after it entered the competition, Footscray TSOB won its first VAFA premiership in ES&A Bank by 5 points in the 1953 D Section grand final. A second premiership came in 1959 with a 1-point victory over AJAX.

In its first C Section grand final, the club lost to Kew in 1964. Four years later, the club defeated St Bernard's to win the 1968 C Section grand final. A fifth premiership came against UHSOB in the 1983 F Section grand final.

At the end of the 1992 season, the club disbanded after Footscray IT merged into the Victoria University of Technology (VUT).

=== VUT ===
Beginning in 1993, a new club − FIT/VUT − competed in the VAFA, entering F2 Section. The club renamed to simply VUT for the 1994 season, where they were defeated by Fitzroy Reds in the G Section reserves grand final.

In 1995, VUT was set to compete in the E Central section, but withdrew before the first game "due to insufficient [player] numbers", instead solely competing in the Club XVIII South competition. The club remained in Club XVIII South in 1996, but just four of its 15 games and folded at the end of the season.

== Club name ==
The club was formed as Footscray TSOB, but Footscray Technical School renamed to Footscray Technical College (FTC) in 1958. As a result, the club changed its name to Footscray Technical College Old Boys (FTCOB).

FTC then renamed to Footscray Institute Of Technology Old Boys (Footscray IT, FITOB or FIT) in 1968, a change that come into effect for the club at the end of the 1968 season. However, some VAFA records show the "FTCOB" name still being used in the 1970s. The new "FITOB" name is seen in The Amateur Footballer as early as 1972.

Despite this, some sources − including the VAFA − claim the club was only renamed to FITOB in 1989.

== Seasons ==
Premiers	Grand Finalist	Minor premiers	Finals appearance	Wooden spoon	Division leading goalkicker	Division best and fairest

=== Seniors ===
Year	League	Division	Finish	W	L	D	Coach	Captain	Best and fairest	Leading goalkicker	Goals	Ref
1931	FDJFL											
1932	MAFA											
1933	VAFA											
1934	VAFA											
1935	VAFA											
1936	VAFA											
1937	VAFA											
1938	VAFA											
1939	VAFA											
1940	VAFA	B Section										
1941	VAFA											
1942	VAFA	(No season)										
1943	VAFA	(No season)										
1944	VAFA	(No season)										
1945	VAFA	(No season)										
1946	VAFA											
1947	VAFA											
1948	VAFA											
1949	VAFA											
1950	VAFA											
1951	VAFA											
1952	VAFA											
1953	VAFA											
1954	VAFA											
1955	VAFA											
1956	VAFA											
1957	VAFA											
1958	VAFA											
1959	VAFA											
1960	VAFA											
1961	VAFA											
1962	VAFA											
1963	VAFA											
1964	VAFA											
1965	VAFA											
1966	VAFA											
1967	VAFA											
1968	VAFA											
1969	VAFA											
1970	VAFA											
1971	VAFA											
1972	VAFA											
1973	VAFA											
1974	VAFA											
1975	VAFA											
1976	VAFA											
1977	VAFA											
1978	VAFA											
1979	VAFA											
1980	VAFA	F Section	7th	8	10	0						
1981	VAFA											
1982	VAFA											
1983	VAFA	F Section	1st	13	5	0						
1984	VAFA	E Section	7th	8	10	0						
1985	VAFA	E Section	9th	3	14	1						
1986	VAFA	F Section	8th	3	14	0	Fred Cook					
1987	VAFA	F Section	10th	2	16	0	R. Boef	S. Baird				
1988	VAFA											
1989	VAFA											
1990	VAFA											
1991	VAFA											
1992	VAFA											

=== Grand finals ===
Premiers	Runners-up	Drawn

Year	League	Division	Grade	Opponent	Score	Venue	Date	Report
1936	VAFA	D Section	Seniors	Coburg Amateurs	18.19 (127) d. 15.8 (98)			
1937	VAFA	C Section	Seniors	Coburg Amateurs	22.24 (156) d. 10.6 (66)			
1953	VAFA	D Section	Seniors	ES&A Bank	5.7 (37) d. 3.14 (32)			
1959	VAFA	D Section	Seniors	AJAX	8.13 (60) d. 7.18 (60)			
1964	VAFA	D Section	Seniors	Kew	14.9 (93) d. 7.4 (46)			
1968	VAFA	C Section	Seniors	St Bernard's	11.6 (72) d. 7.9 (51)			
1983	VAFA	F Section	Seniors	UHSOB	12.10 (82) d. 12.7 (79)		10 September 1983	

== Notable players ==
A number of Footscray Teach players later joined clubs in the Victorian Football League (VFL), now known as the Australian Football League (AFL), including several who joined the Footscray Football Club.

- Harry Chalmers − North Melbourne and Footscray
- Dick Eason − Footscray and Essendon
- Ian Fleming − Footscray
- Jim Greenham − Footscray
- Max Isaac − Footscray
- Rod O'Connor − Footscray
- Arthur Olliver − Footscray

Additionally, Fred Cook − who did play for Footscray after leaving Footscray Tech − later went onto play 300 games in the Victorian Football Association (VFA).
