= Rod McFarlane =

Australian rules footballer and coach

Personal information
- Full name: Rodney Keith McFarlane
- Born: 16 December 1950 (age 75)
- Original team: Coburg Amateurs
- Height: 191 cm (6 ft 3 in)
- Weight: 89 kg (196 lb)
- Position: Full-forward

Playing career^{1}
Years	Club	Games (Goals)
1971	Essendon	4 (3)
1973–74	Prahran (VFA)	9 (17)
1977	Northcote (VFA)	8 (17)
- ^{1} Playing statistics correct to the end of 1971.

Career highlights
- 3x VAFA leading goalkicker (1968, 1969, 1970)

Rodney Keith McFarlane (born 16 December 1950) is a former Australian rules footballer who played with Essendon in the Victorian Football League (VFL). He won the league reserves goalkicking in 1972. McFarlane left Essendon in 1973 to play with Prahran in the Victorian Football Association (VFA). He played four seasons with Prahran and later returned to his original team, Coburg Amateurs, coaching them from 1980 to 1982.
