= Roderic O'Connor =

Roderic or Roderick O'Connor may refer to:

- Roderic O'Conor (1860–1940), Irish painter
- Roderic O'Connor (land commissioner) (1784–1860), Irish-Australian businessman and official
- Roderic O'Connor (painter) (1907–2001), American painter
- Roderic L. O'Connor (1921–1982), U.S. Assistant Secretary of State
- Ruaidrí Ua Conchobair (c.1116–1198), (anglicised as Roderic O'Connor), High King of Ireland
- Ruaidrí na Saide Buide (died 1118), (anglicised as Roderic O'Connor), king of Connacht
- Roderic O'Connor (horse) (born 2008), racehorse
- Roderick O'Connor (politician) (1910–2000), Northern Irish nationalist politician

== See also ==
- Rod O'Connor (disambiguation)
