= Rashaant, Orkhontuul =

Village in Mongolia

Rashaant Рашаант (Mongolian)
- Village
- Country: Mongolia
- Province: Selenge
- District: Orkhontuul

Population
  - Estimate (2024): 1,746

Rashaant (Mongolian: Рашаант) is a village in Orkhontuul, Selenge Province, Mongolia. As of 2024, it had population of 1,746.
