= Harry Chalmers =

Australian rules footballer

Personal information
- Full name: Harry Chalmers
- Born: 4 April 1920
- Died: 26 August 1982 (aged 62)
- Original team: Footscray Tech Old Boys
- Height: 180 cm (5 ft 11 in)
- Weight: 75 kg (165 lb)

Playing career^{1}
Years	Club	Games (Goals)
1943	North Melbourne	10 (0)
1944–45	Footscray	13 (3)
Total		23 (3)
- ^{1} Playing statistics correct to the end of 1945.

Harry Chalmers (4 April 1920 – 26 August 1982) was a former Australian rules footballer who played with North Melbourne and Footscray in the Victorian Football League (VFL).
