= Rod O'Connor (footballer) =

Australian rules footballer

Personal information
- Full name: Rod O'Connor
- Born: 11 January 1948 (age 78)
- Original team: Footscray Tech Old Boys
- Height: 183 cm (6 ft 0 in)
- Weight: 83 kg (183 lb)

Playing career^{1}
Years	Club	Games (Goals)
1965–67	Footscray	9 (0)
- ^{1} Playing statistics correct to the end of 1967.

Rod O'Connor (born 11 January 1948) is a former Australian rules footballer who played with Footscray in the Victorian Football League (VFL and Central Districts in the SANFL.
