= Christopher Sonn =

Social psychologist

- Occupation: Professor of Psychology

Academic background
- Education: Chisholm Institute of Technology; Victoria College; Victoria University of Technology

Christopher Conrad Sonn (born 1967) is an Australian social psychologist whose work in the area of community and liberation psychology focuses on intergroup relations, racism, White privilege, and non-dominant group responses to oppression. Sonn is Professor of Psychology at the College of Health and Biomedicine of the Victoria University, Melbourne (VU).

Sonn is a lead researcher in the VU Community Identity and Displacement Research Network, which studies issues related to indigenous peoples, social justice, racism, refugees, social inclusion, transnationalism and xenophobia. Sonn is the co-author of the textbook Social Psychology of Everyday Life and co-editor of the volumes Psychology of Liberation: Theory and Applications, and Psychological Sense of Community: Research, Applications, and Implications.

== Biography ==
Sonn attended the Chisholm Institute of Technology, where he received his Bachelor of Arts. He later obtained a Graduate Diploma of Education from Victoria College and a Graduate Diploma of Applied Psychology from the Victoria University of Technology in Melbourne, Australia. Sonn completed his PhD in Psychology at Victoria University of Technology in 1995. His dissertation titled "The role of psychological sense of community in the adjustment of 'coloured' South African immigrants" was conducted under the guidance of Adrian Fisher, Professor Emeritus at Victoria University.

He is a lead researcher on the international Apartheid Archive Project.

== Research ==
Sonn's research uses qualitative methods to understand and elevate the voices of individuals and groups who are marginalized through forms of racism and sexism. Sonn and his colleagues' work has explored the idea of community resilience and how different communities or people of varying in race and/or gender respond to conditions of adversity and cope with stress and other issues. The researchers argued that oppressed, minority communities are often represented as lacking in resilience and competence, which makes it easy for people in these groups to be underemphasized and misunderstood in society. Sonn's research team uses the concept of whiteness and its associated privileges as a context for thinking about race relations and developing effective forms of anti-racist action.

== Representative publications ==
- Ali, L., & Sonn, C. C. (2010). Constructing identity as a second-generation Cypriot Turkish in Australia: The multi-hyphenated other. Culture & Psychology, 16(3), 416-436.
- Green, M. J., Sonn, C. C., & Matsebula, J. (2007). Reviewing whiteness: Theory, research, and possibilities. South African Journal of Psychology, 37(3), 389-419.
- Sonn, C. C., & Fisher, A. T. (1996). Psychological sense of community in a politically constructed group. Journal of Community Psychology, 24(4), 417-430.
- Sonn, C. C., & Fisher, A. T. (1998). Sense of community: Community resilient responses to oppression and change. Journal of Community Psychology, 26(5), 457-472.
- Stevens, G., Duncan, N., & Sonn, C. C. (2013). Memory, narrative and voice as liberatory praxis in the apartheid archive. In Race, Memory and the Apartheid Archive (pp. 25–44). Palgrave Macmillan, London.
