= Ian Fleming (Australian footballer, born 1937) =

Australian rules footballer

Personal information
- Born: 14 November 1937
- Original team: Footscray Tech Old Boys / Newport
- Height: 174 cm (5 ft 9 in)
- Weight: 75 kg (165 lb)

Playing career^{1}
Years	Club	Games (Goals)
1958–59	Footscray	9 (10)
- ^{1} Playing statistics correct to the end of 1959.

Ian Fleming (born 14 November 1937) is a former Australian rules footballer who played with Footscray in the Victorian Football League (VFL).
