= Alan Rogers =

Alan Rogers may refer to:

- Alan Rogers (bishop) (1907–2003), bishop of Mauritius, and of Fulham, and of Edmonton
- Alan Rogers (camping) (1918/1919–2000), British camping enthusiast and publisher
- Alan Rogers (footballer, born 1977), English football player for Accrington Stanley
- Alan Rogers (footballer, born 1954), English football player for Plymouth Argyle and Portsmouth
- Alan Rogers (football manager) (1923–2022), English football manager
- Alan G. Rogers (1967–2008), US Army Major, pastor, first confirmed gay fatality in Iraq
- Alan R. Rogers (born 1950), American anthropologist

== See also ==
- Allan Rogers (disambiguation)
- Al Rogers, race car driver
- Alan Rodgers (1959–2014), fiction writer
- Allen Rogers (footballer) (1930–2017), Australian footballer
