= James Wandin =

- Born: 28 July 1933; Coranderrk Station
- Died: 20 February 2006 (aged 72)
- Other names: Jim, Jimmy, Juby
- Relatives: William Barak

Ngurungaeta of the Wurundjeri people
- Succeeded by: Murrundindi
Australian rules football career
Personal information
- Original team: Healesville
- Height: 183 cm (6 ft 0 in)
- Weight: 83 kg (183 lb)
- Position: Centre half forward
Playing career^{1}
Years	Club	Games (Goals)
1952–1953	St Kilda	17 (3)
- ^{1} Playing statistics correct to the end of 1953.
Career highlights
- Yarra Valley Football League Reserves Premiership: 1949; Yarra Valley Football League Seniors Premiership: 1954; Yarra Valley Football League Reserves Best & Fairest: 1949; Yarra Valley Football League Seniors Best & Fairest: 1954, 1957, 1958, 1959

James Wandin (28 July 1933 – 20 February 2006), also known as Jim, Jimmy, or Juby, was the ngurungaeta of the Wurundjeri till his death in February 2006. He was the first Australian rules footballer of Aboriginal descent to play with St Kilda Football Club in 1952–1953.

== Family ==
James Wandin was a great-great nephew to William Barak, the last traditional ngurungaeta of the Wurundjeri-willam clan. He was the last person born at Coranderrk Station, in 1933, in the home of his grandmother, Jemima Wandin. When the Station was closed in 1923 Jemima Wandin was one of 5 elderly people who refused to leave. She is buried in the Coranderrk Cemetery.

His father, Jarlo Wandoon, tried to enlist for World War I, but was rejected due to being an Aboriginal. When he attempted to enlist under his whitefella name, James Wandin, he was accepted into the army and served in France and is listed under that name on the honour roll in the Healesville RSL. On returning home, Jarlo Wandoon had to get permission from the police to visit his mother, was escorted onto Coranderrk, and was only allowed half an hour with her before he was sent off to the Lake Tyers Mission in Gippsland.

Much of Coranderrk was divided up and sold for soldier settlement allotments.

Jarlo found work with the Postmaster-General's Department, and was able to buy a block of land at Healesville – a home for his family on Wurundjeri land.

== Football ==
One of ten children, James left school at 15 in 1949 and played Australian rules football with the Healesville seconds. The team won the Yarra Valley Football League (YVFL) premiership and Wandin was awarded the YVFL Seconds Best and Fairest.

He moved on to play with the Healesville seniors who won a premiership in 1951.

He joined St Kilda Football Club in 1952, after a period of training with them at Junction Oval. He was the first Aboriginal footballer with St Kilda, playing centre half forward. Other Aboriginal players in the VFL at the time were Essendon's Norm McDonald and Melbourne's Eddie Jackson. He left St Kilda Football Club after just 17 games due to "homesickness" and what he later reflected as a lack of support.

Wandin was appointed as captain-coach of Healesville in 1954, a position he held until 1960.

Wandin won the YVFL best and fairest medal in 1954, 1957, 1958 and 1959 and led Healesville to the 1954 premiership. Wandin was also Healesville's senior football captain from 1968 to 1970.

The best and fairest award in the Yarra Valley Mountain District Football League Division Two competition was called the James Wandin Medal. The Wandin Medal continued as the best and fairest award in the now Outer East Football Netball League.

He was called up for National Service in 1952.

He joined the Postmaster-General's Department and worked for 37 years, but continued to coach football at Healesville and Apollo Bay.

In 2003 Wandin reflected on the racist taunts he faced during games in a report in The Age newspaper: "Opposition players would call you niggers and all that, the whole lot, Kooris and whatever week in, week out. Pretty rash things said, I can tell you. You had to just deal with it yourself, nothing like what Michael Long's got now going. You dealt with it, you just got on with the game."

== Ngurungaeta ==
James Wandin held the position of Ngurungaeta in the Wurundjeri nation. He was also President of the Wurundjeri Tribe Land Compensation and Cultural Heritage Council.

In 2000 James Wandin and Carolyn Briggs, representing the Wurundjeri and Boonerwurung peoples of the Kulin nation, gave historic welcome to country speeches at a sitting of the Victorian Parliament on 26 May 2000. Parliament Hill was noted in Wandin's speech as one of the Wurundjeri ceremonial corroboree grounds.

He concluded his speech to parliament saying:

We are sorry for the pain and suffering of our ancestors, and we will never forget them. We need to heal and strengthen ourselves to continue on with their struggle for equality and justice for Aboriginal people. We as the Wurundjeri people urge the Victorian government not to lose sight of this significant change to history. Otherwise we may never have cultural harmony. To achieve this will not be easy, and we all recognise that. Positive action and your support will help us to find the necessary answers along the way to reforms compatible and acceptable to all.

Times are changing. You the Victorian government have invited and welcomed us to your place, and we as the traditional owners and custodians of this land give back to you our welcome. Wominjeka yearmenn koondee-bik Wurundjeri-Ballak, which simply means, 'Welcome to the land of the Wurundjeri people'.

== Death ==
While ill with cancer in February 2006 he prepared a statutory declaration declaring his nephew Murrundindi his successor as Wurundjeri Ngurungaeta. After his death his partner, Judy Freeman, symbolically passed to Murrundindi a lil-lal, or hunting boomerang, and a sprig of pale yellow wattle. Several hundred people attended Healesville football oval to pay their respects to a respected Wurundjeri elder and great footballer. He was buried at Healesville Cemetery, in the shadow of Mount Riddell, as he requested.

The Annual best and fairest player award in division two of the Yarra Valley Mountain Football League is called the Wandin Medal. The James (Juby) Wandin Memorial Match has been established by Yarra Glen Football Club to commemorate James Wandin's 55 years contribution to the sport as a player and coach at local level and at Apollo Bay. The inaugural match in May 2008, won by Yarra Glen Football Club, was used to raise funds to erect a memorial at James Wandin's grave and for a perpetual trophy.
