= John McCarthy (Australian rules footballer, born 1989) =

- McCarthy in June 2012

Personal information
- Full name: John Shane McCarthy
- Nickname: J-Mac
- Born: 19 November 1989; Victoria, Australia
- Died: 9 September 2012 (aged 22); Las Vegas, Nevada, U.S.
- Original team: Dandenong Stingrays (TAC Cup)
- Draft: No. 31, 2007 National Draft, Collingwood; No. 8, 2012 Pre-Season Draft, Port Adelaide
- Height: 189 cm (6 ft 2 in)
- Weight: 82 kg (181 lb)
- Position: Midfielder

Playing career^{1}
Years	Club	Games (Goals)
2008–2011	Collingwood	18 (10)
2012	Port Adelaide	21 (5)
Total		39 (15)
- ^{1} Playing statistics correct to the end of 2012.

John Shane McCarthy (19 November 1989 – 9 September 2012) was an Australian rules footballer who played for the Collingwood Football Club and Port Adelaide Football Club in the Australian Football League (AFL).

== Family ==
McCarthy's father Shane and brother Matthew both played football with Geelong. He also had two uncles, Bernie and Gavan, who played for North Melbourne. His grandfather Alan Olle and great uncle Jack Coffey played for St Kilda.

== Education ==
McCarthy attended The Peninsula School in Mount Eliza, Victoria, graduating in 2007.

== Playing career ==
Drafted by Collingwood with the 31st selection in the 2007 National Draft, McCarthy was a midfielder. He made his debut late in the 2008 AFL season and held his position for the last six matches of the year, including two finals. He struggled to maintain his place in the Collingwood side in 2009 and 2010, playing only two games in each season due to poor form and injuries. In each year, however, he returned to the senior side at the end of the year, playing in the qualifying final in 2009 and being named as an emergency for the 2010 AFL Grand Final. He played eight games in 2011; however, he was not selected during the finals, being delisted by Collingwood at the end of the 2011 season.

After training with Richmond, he was drafted by Port Adelaide in the 2012 pre-season draft, who had the selection before Richmond. He cemented his place in the Port side for the 2012 season, missing only one game for the year.

== Death ==
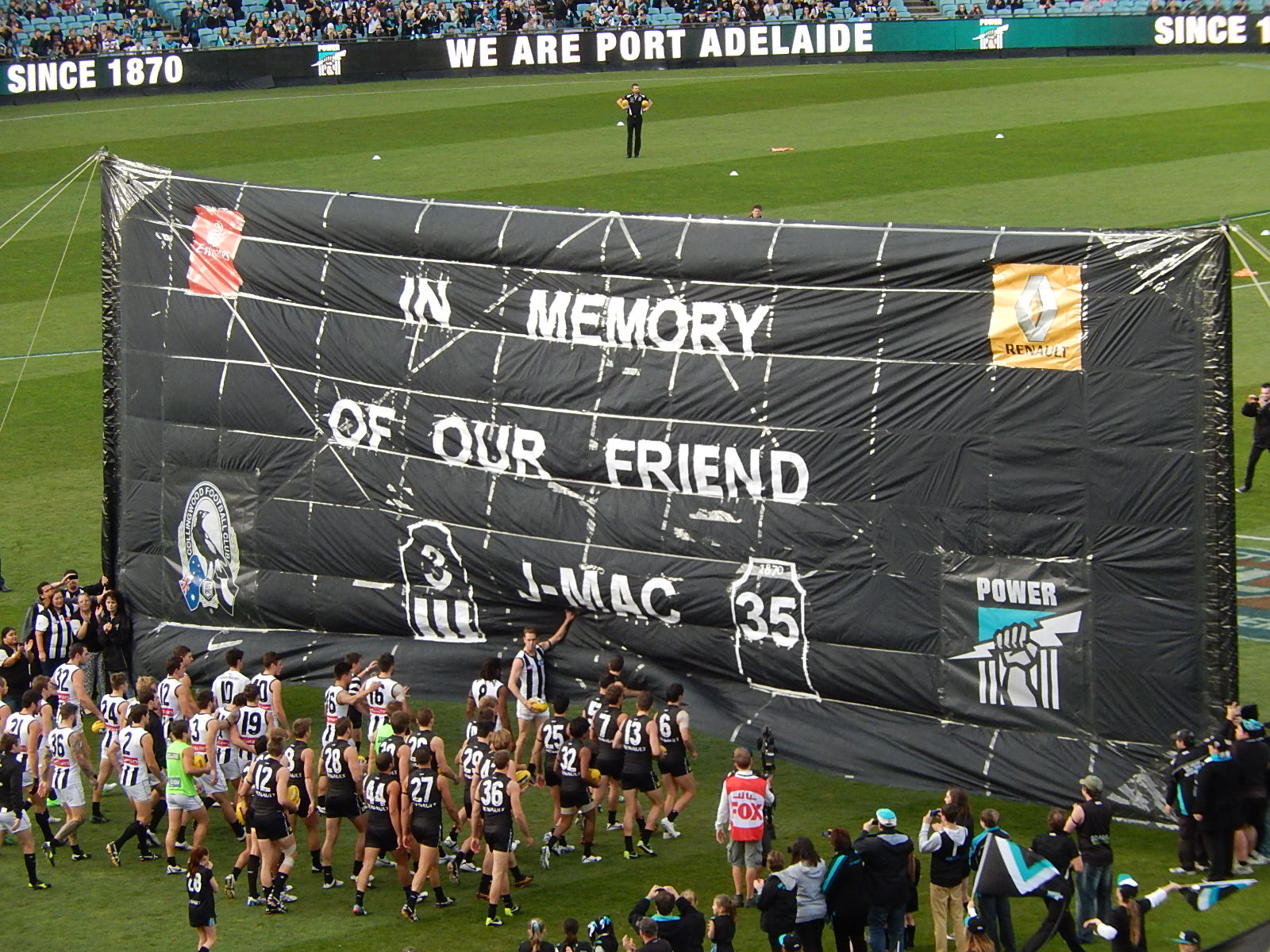
Commemorative banner

McCarthy died on 9 September 2012, after falling 9 metres (30 ft) from a rooftop at the Flamingo Hotel on the Las Vegas Strip in Paradise, Nevada. The incident occurred at the start of a post-season holiday for McCarthy and other Port Adelaide players. They had arrived in the U.S. resort city only a few hours before the incident. After reviewing evidence, police said that McCarthy had attempted to jump off the roof onto a palm tree, but slipped and fell to the ground.

Following his passing, Port Adelaide retired the #35 jersey until 2 December 2024.
