= Monbulk Football Netball Club =

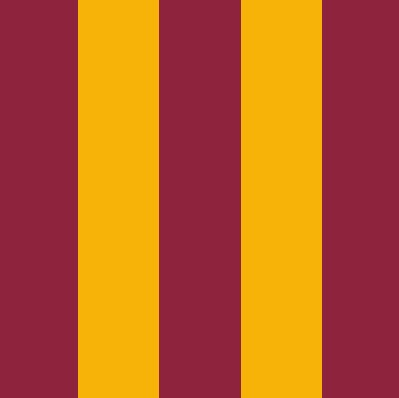

Names
- Full name: Monbulk Football Netball Club
- Nickname(s): The Hawks.

Club details
- Founded: 1895
- Colours: Maroon and Gold
- Competition: Outer East Football Netball League
- Premierships: 15 (Seniors) 1912, 1913, 1914, 1919, 1920, 1921, 1923, 1935, 1983, 1987, 1991, 1997, 1998, 2005, 2006.
- Ground(s): Monbulk Recreation Reserve

Other information
- Official website: Monbulk FNC website

Monbulk Football Netball Club, nicknamed The Hawks, competes in the Outer East Football Netball League. Monbulk was a foundation member of the YVMDFL in 1966, which had since changed its name to Yarra Ranges FNL in 2016 and is now known as the AFL Outer East Football Netball League competition since 2019.

== History ==
=== In the beginning (1895–1910) ===
The Monbulk Football Club first appeared in 1895 when a team led by Dick Wigmore defeated Ferntree Gully. The club only played challenge matches until 1903. In 1904 Monbulk was a foundation club of the first district football competition, the Evelyn Football Association, along with Macclesfield, Emerald and Woori Yallock. Monbulk played in local competitions until 1907. Between 1908 and 1910 the club played challenge matches against neighbouring clubs such as Ferny Creek and Olinda.

=== Mountain District Football Association (1911–1924) ===
The Mountain District Football Association was formed in 1911 with Monbulk being a foundation club, along with Belgrave, Ferny Creek United and Olinda.

Monbulk was the dominant club in this competition, winning six consecutive premierships either side of WW1, in 1912, 1913, 1914, 1919, 1920 and 1921.

Monbulk won 7 premierships in 8 seasons when they again won the premiership in 1923 with a 16 year old full forward named Bert Hyde. Hyde joined VFL club Hawthorn in 1925 and he led their goal kicking for five consecutive seasons 1926–1930.

=== Scoresby District Football Association (1925–1929) ===
The MDFA disbanded in 1925 and Monbulk joined the new Scoresby District FA. The move was not popular and the club struggled in 1925 and 1926 before disbanding part way through the 1927 season and sitting out 1928–29.

=== Mountain District Football Association (1930–1936) ===
Clubs were keen to reform the Mountain District FA with Monbulk reforming and joining up again. Monbulk were competitive but not as successful as previously. The club did manage to win their 8th premiership in 1935 when they defeated Emerald by 1 point. In 1936 the competition became known as the Belgrave District FA before disbanding at the end of the season.

=== Yarra Valley FA, Ringwood DFA and WW2 (1937-1944) ===
Monbulk joined the Yarra Valley Football Association in 1937 and stayed for 2 years.

In 1939, with less numbers, Monbulk merged with their neighbours, Olinda, to form the Olinda-Monbulk Football Club and competed in the Ringwood District Football Association before disbanding for the WW2 years between 1940 and 1944.

=== Mountain District Football Association (1945–1965) ===
The MDFA reformed in 1945 and Monbulk were to be in this competition for the next 20 years but, although they came close, they did not manage to win any premierships in this era. The best being runners up in 1953, 1954, 1956 and 1963. The club introduced Reserves in 1950 and Under 16s in 1953.

=== Yarra Valley Mountain District Football League (1966–2015) ===
After the Mountain District FA and the Yarra Valley Football League had both lost clubs to the new Eastern Districts Football League (formed 1962), the two competitions merged to form the YVMDFL. Monbulk was to be an inaugural club in this competition and have remained ever since. Monbulk lost another Grand Final in 1972, to Healesville, and it wasn't until 1983 that the Hawks finally managed to claim a premiership again, after a 48-year drought. A few years later Monbulk were twice demoted to 2nd Division, in 1987 and 1991, but won the premierships on both occasions to return to 1st Division. Monbulk had a golden era for 20 years from 1996 until 2015 with finals in most years and winning another 4 premierships in 1997, 1998, 2005 and 2006. During that time Monbulk also formed their first netball club when the inaugural A Grade Netball competition started in 2005. Monbulk won the A Grade premiership in 2006.

=== Recent history (2016–2023) ===
In 2016 the YVMDFL rebranded itself as the AFL Yarra Ranges Football Netball League until 2018. Monbulk was not as successful in those years and missed the finals. When the South East FL collapsed at the end of 2018, the remaining clubs were accepted by Yarra Ranges and the competition was renamed AFL Outer East. Monbulk were placed in Division 1 with the stronger clubs placed in a new Premier Division. The Hawks finished third in 2019 before 2020 was lost to Covid. In 2021 Monbulk headed the ladder before the season was again cancelled through Covid. With a number of the former South East clubs leaving to join the Eastern or Southern Leagues, Monbulk was placed into Premier Division for 2022 and made the finals that year but losing the Elimination Final by 1 point. In 2023 the Hawks were battling for a finals spot until the final round but eventually finished 7th.

== Premierships ==
Football

- Seniors
  - Mountain District Football Association
    - 1912, 1913, 1914, 1919, 1920, 1921, 1923, 1935.
- Seniors
  - Yarra Valley Mountain District Football League
    - Division One
    - 1983, 1997, 1998, 2005, 2006.
- Seniors
  - Yarra Valley Mountain District Football League
    - Division Two
      - 1987, 1991
- Reserves
  - Mountain District Football Association
    - 1953, 1954, 1956.
- Reserves
  - Yarra Valley Mountain District Football League
    - 1971, 1973, 1975, 1982, 1987, 2010.
- Thirds
  - Mountain District Football Association
    - Under 16 - 1953, 1956, 1960, 1961, 1964.
- Thirds
  - Yarra Valley Mountain District Football League
    - Under 17 - 1971, 1974, 1991.
      - Under 18 - 1992, 2009
- Veterans
  - 1995, 1996
- Women's
  - 2022, 2024

Netball

- A Grade
  - 2006
- B Grade
  - 2008
