= Allan Rogers =

Allan or Allen Rogers may refer to:

- Allan Rogers (American politician) (1832–1913), American politician from Massachusetts
- Allan Rogers (British politician) (1932–2023), British Labour Party politician
- Allan Rogers (entertainer) (1891–1984), American tenor, actor, recording artist, voice teacher, conductor, radio producer, and academic
- Allen Rogers (footballer) (1930–2017), Australian rules footballer

== See also ==
- Alan Rogers (disambiguation)
