= Shane McCarthy (footballer) =

Australian rules footballer

Personal information
- Full name: Shane McCarthy
- Born: 22 April 1952 (age 74)
- Original team: Yea / Assumption College
- Height: 191 cm (6 ft 3 in)
- Weight: 92 kg (203 lb)

Playing career^{1}
Years	Club	Games (Goals)
1970–1971	Geelong	3 (0)
1976-80	Sorrento	78 (0)
- ^{1} Playing statistics correct to the end of 1971.

Shane McCarthy (born 22 April 1952) is a former Australian rules footballer who played with Geelong in the Victorian Football League (VFL).

McCarthy, a defender, came from Yea originally and was a student at Assumption College. He appeared for Geelong in the final two home and away rounds of the 1970 VFL season and in round eight of the 1971 season.

McCarthy is now a lawyer who lives in Sorrento, Victoria.

His brothers Bernie McCarthy and Gavan McCarthy also played in the Victorian Football League, at North Melbourne. He had two sons that played league football as well, Matthew McCarthy, who played with Geelong and John McCarthy, who played for both Collingwood and Port Adelaide.
