= Herbie Brunning =

Australian rules footballer

Personal information
- Full name: Herbert Henry Brunning
- Born: 25 August 1899; Lilydale, Victoria
- Died: 20 December 1969 (aged 70); Lilydale, Victoria
- Original teams: Lilydale, Mitcham
- Height: 170 cm (5 ft 7 in)
- Weight: 73 kg (161 lb)

Playing career^{1}
Years	Club	Games (Goals)
1923–24	Richmond	2 (0)
- ^{1} Playing statistics correct to the end of 1924.

Herbert Henry Brunning (25 August 1899 – 20 December 1969) was an Australian rules footballer who played with Richmond in the Victorian Football League (VFL).

Brunning was originally from Lilydale and played in their 1919, 1922 and 1923 Yarra Valley Football Association premierships.

Brunning also played in Mitcham's 1921 premiership too.
