= Geoff McGivern =

Geoff McGivern is the name of:

- Geoffrey McGivern (born 1952), English actor
- Geoff McGivern (footballer) (1930–2015), former Australian rules football player
