= Yea Football Club =

Yea

Names
- Full name: Yea Football Netball Club
- Nickname: Tigers
- Club song: Oh we're from Tigerland

Club details
- Founded: 1893; 133 years ago
- Colours
- Competition: Outer East FNL
- Premierships: (14):1896, 1902, 1912, 1919, 1920, 1945, 1946, 1950, 1968, 1976, 1982, 1984, 2003, 2005.
- Ground: Yea Showgrounds

Uniforms
Home	Away

Other information
- Official website: Official website

Yea Football Netball Club (colloquially known as The Tigers) is an Australian rules football club based in the Victorian town of Yea. The club competes in the Outer East Football Netball League.

== History ==
The Yea Football Club was established and played its first published football match against Alexandra in June, 1887, with Alexandra being victorious. Yea initially competed in the North East Football Association, a competition that was centred around Seymour in 1892.

In 1902 the Alexandra & Yea Football Association was founded with clubs from Alexandra, Thornton, Yarck and Yea competing. Yea won the inaugural premiership. In 1904 the club accepted a return to the NEFA and stayed until 1909. In an attempt to revive interest in the district Yea helped to reform the Alexandra & Yea FA in 1911 after the competition had been inoperative for some time.

In 1913 Yea played for one season in the King Parrot Creek Football Association, losing the Grand Final to Homewood 4.3.27 to 0.7.7.

In 1924 Yea moved on to the Waranga North East FL. This league functioned until the end of 1976, Yea won the last premiership.

In 1937, Yea Reserves played in the Mansfield & Alexandra Football League.

In 1977 Yea played in the Yarra Valley Mountain District Football League until 1985.

In 1986 the club moved to the Kyabram & District Football League for twelve seasons.

In 1997 the Goulburn Valley Football League absorbed the clubs from the Tungamah Football League and had a second division for three years (1996–1998). These second division clubs then left to form the Central Goulburn Football League in 1998. At the end of 2005 Central Goulburn Football League ceased to exist and broke up and the teams went to other leagues.

Yea FC went to Kyabram & District Football League.

After two years Yea returned to the Yarra Valley Mountain District Football League.

In 2022 Yea was unable to field a football team, and merged with Broadford FNC for the 2022 season.

in 2023 Yea football went into recess, unable to field a side.

The club continued to participate in the AFL Outer East Football Netball League Netball competition.

Yea recommenced its football teams for 2024 in the Outer East Football Netball League competition.

== Football Timeline ==
- 1892 - 1901: North Eastern Football Association
- 1902 - 1903: Alexandra & Yea Football Association
- 1904 - 1910: North Eastern Football Association
- 1911 - 1912: Alexandra & Yea Football Association
- 1913 - King Parrot Creek Football Association
- 1914 - Alexandra & Yea Football Association
- 1915 - Alexandra & District Football Association
- 1916 - 1918: Club in recess due to WW1
- 1919 - Alexandra, Yarck & Yea District Football Association
- 1920 - 1923: Alexandra & Yea Football Association
- 1924 - 1938: Waranga North East Football Association
- 1939 - 1940: Alexandra & Mansfield Football Association
- 1941 - 1944: Club in recess, due to WW2
- 1945 - Alexandra & District Football Association
- 1946 - Upper Goulburn Football Association
- 1947 - 1976: Waranga North East Football Association
- 1977 - 1985: Yarra Valley Mountain District Football League
- 1986 - 1997: Kyabram & District Football League
- 1998: Goulburn Valley Football League - Division Two
- 1999 - 2005: Central Goulburn Football League
- 2006 - 2007: Kyabram & District Football League
- 2008 - 2015: Yarra Valley Mountain District Football League
- 2016 - 2018: Yarra Ranges Football & Netball League
- 2019 - 2022: Outer East Football Netball League
- 2022 - Yea merged with Broadford Football Club
- 2023 - Yea Football Club goes into recess. Netball Club still competing in the Outer East Football Netball League
- 2024 - 2025: Outer East Football Netball League

== Football Premierships ==
Seniors

- North East FA
  - 1896 - Yea: 2.5 - 17 drew Tallarook: 2.5 - 17
- Alexandra District Football Association
  - 1902 - Yea: 7.12 - 54 d Alexandra: 3.4 - 22
- Alexandra & Yea Football Association
  - 1912 - Yea: 6.8 - 44 d Alexandra: 5.11 - 41
- Alexandra, Yarck & Yea District Football Association
  - 1919 - Yea: 8.18 - 66 d Yarck: 2.3 - 15
- Yea & Alexandra Football Association
  - 1920 - Yea: 8.5 - 53 d Alexandra: 4.13 - 37
- Alexandra & District Football Association
  - 1945 - Yea d Alexandra
- Upper Goulburn Football Association
  - 1946 - Yea: 16.18 - 114 d Mansfield: 10.14 - 74
- Waranga North East Football Association
  - 1950 - Yea: 9.10 - 64 d Seymour: 6.5 - 41
  - 1968 - Yea: 15.11 - 101 d Seymour: 11.8 - 74
  - 1976 - Yea: 12.15 - 87 d
- Yarra Valley Mountain District Football League, (2nd Division)
  - 1982 - Yea: 18.17 - 113 d Belgrave: 15.11 - 101
  - 1984 - Yea: 31.20 - 206 d Silvan: 18.17 - 113
- Central Goulburn Football League
  - 2003 - Yea:
  - 2005 - Yea: 9.12 - 66 d Rumbalara: 8.9 - 57

== Football Runner Up ==
Seniors

Grand Final Losses (Came 2nd):

- Waranga North East Football Association
  - 1929 - Broadford: 13.12 - 90 def Yea: 12.5 - 77
  - 1937 - Euroa: d Yea:
  - 1938 - Nagambie: d Yea:
  - 1947 - Seymour: 16.26.122 def Yea: 15.9.99
  - 1961 - Thorton / Eildon: d Yea:
  - 1966 - Seymour: d Yea:
- Kyabram District Football League
  - 1995 - Ardmona: 13.7.85 def Yea: 9.15.69
- Central Goulburn Football League
  - 2000 - Alexandra: 12.9 - 81 d Yea: 8.14 - 62
  - 2001 - Shepparton East: 19.12.126 def Yea: 10.10.70
  - 2002 - Rumbalara: 17.9.111 def Yea: 16.9.105

== Football League Best & Fairest Winners ==
Seniors

- Waranga North East Football Association. Keith Bryant Trophy
  - 1950 - Allen Rogers
- Kyabram District Football Netball League. McNamara Medal
  - 1991 - P Cunningham
  - 1995 & 1996 - R Martin
- Goulburn Valley Football League – Division Two. Lawless Medal
  - 1998 - Chris Pollard

Reserves

- Waranga North East Football Association
  - 1951 - Claude Rogers
- Kyabram District Football Netball League. Wade Medal
  - 1986 - G Garlick
  - 1988 - L Gales

Thirds

- Kyabram District Football Netball League. Inch Medal
  - 1986 - J Lockhart
  - 1987 - P Tunnis
  - 1991 - R Comerford

== VFL/AFL ==
The following footballers played with Yea, prior to playing senior football in the VFL/AFL, and / or drafted, with the year indicating their VFL/AFL debut.

- 1920 - Maurie McLeish - St. Kilda
- 1927 - Harry Verdon - St. Kilda and Fitzroy
- 1931 - Steven Bloomer - North Melbourne
- 1931 - Bill Purcell - North Melbourne
- 1935 - Jack Parker - North Melbourne
- 1937 - Lindsay McLure - Footscray
- 1939 - Derek Symonds - Melbourne
- 1949 - John McLeish - Essendon
- 1952 - Allen Rogers - Footscray
- 1962 - Bernie McCarthy (North Melbourne)
- 1963 - Allan Anderson - Fitzroy
- 1965 - Gavan McCarthy (North Melbourne)
- 1968 - Jeff Hopgood (North Melbourne)
- 1969 - Glenn Elliott (St Kilda, Melbourne)
- 1970 - Shane McCarthy (Geelong)
- 1973 - Robert Elliott (St Kilda, Melbourne)
- 1974 - David Murray - Melbourne
- 1990 - Matthew Dundas (Fitzroy, Richmond)

The following footballers played senior VFL / AFL football prior to playing and / or coaching with Yea with the year indicating their first season in the VFL / AFL.

- 1911 - Ted Brown (Carlton)
- 1925 - Frank Costigan - Fitzroy
- 1937 - Lawrence Morgan - Fitzroy
- 1941 - Vin Brown (Carlton)
- 1947 - Edward Jackson (Melbourne)
- 1958 - Garry Rasmussen - Hawthorn
- 1962 - Peter Dolling - South Melbourne
- 1969 - Dick Ivey (North Melbourne)
- 1979 - Mick Warren - Collingwood

== Club Song ==
Oh, We're from Tigerland, A fighting fury, We're from Tigerland, In any weather you will see us with a grin, Risking head and shin, If we're behind then never mind, We'll fight and fight and win, For we're from Tigerland, We never weaken til the final siren's gone, Like the Tiger of old, We're strong and we're bold, For we're from Tiger, Yellow and Black, We're from Tigerland.

== Links ==
- 1935 - Seymour FC & Yea FC team photos
- 1937 - Waranga North East FL Semi Final team photos
