= Bernie McCarthy =

Australian rules footballer (1943–2019)

Personal information
- Full name: Bernard Francis McCarthy
- Born: 21 August 1943; Caulfield, Victoria
- Died: 16 February 2019 (aged 75); Seymour, Victoria
- Original team: Yea (WNEFL)
- Height: 191 cm (6 ft 3 in)
- Weight: 92 kg (203 lb)

Playing career^{1}
| Years | Club | Games (Goals) |
| 1962–1971 | North Melbourne | 148 (80) |
| 1971 | Preston (VFA) | 6 (0) |
- ^{1} Playing statistics correct to the end of 1971.

Bernard Francis McCarthy (21 August 1943 – 16 February 2019) was an Australian rules footballer who played with North Melbourne in the Victorian Football League (VFL).

McCarthy was the eldest of three brothers from Yea who played in the VFL. The youngest, Shane, played at Geelong and the other, Gavan McCarthy, made two appearances for North Melbourne, one of them with Bernie in round five of the 1965 VFL season. A nephew, Matthew, was also a Geelong footballer and another, John, played at Collingwood and Port Adelaide.

McCarthy played footy in four separate decades - the 50s, 60s, 70s and 80s. He attended Assumption College Kilmore from 1956 to 1960 and during this time he played in the firsts in 1958, 1959 and 1960. From here he moved to Yea Football Club in 1961 where he was runner-up in the Waranga North East Football Association Best and Fairest award.

Drafted to North Melbourne in 1962, Bernie commenced his stellar career playing 148 games. Bernie was renowned for his marking and handball skill, although in his own words he wasn't “much of a kick at any time” but he was known for his willingness to move the ball on from a mark or contest at speed; a trait considered well ahead of his time which earned Bernie the nickname 'Bolter.' In one memorable game, round 16, 1969, McCarthy had 31 disposals, 11 marks and kicked four goals.

A centre half-forward, McCarthy partnered John Dugdale as North Melbourne's key forwards throughout the 1960s.

In 1967 and 1970 McCarthy was selected for the Victorian team.

Achilles problems towards the end of 1971 saw him finish the season at Victorian Football Association (VFA) club Preston and was one of the club's best players in the Grand Final loss to Dandenong that year.

After recovering and back in top form, in 1972 Bernie was offered the coaching position at South Bendigo, where he went on to captain and coach for 5 years. In 1973 he was awarded the Bendigo Football League Best and Fairest Michaelson Medal and led South Bendigo to Premiership victory in 1974. 1977 saw him move to coach and play in a one-year stint at Rushworth that saw the Tigers become Premiers of the Heathcote District Football League.

The years 1978-1980 saw him appointed to Captain Coach for Seymour. Bernie jointly won the News-Winfield Award with David Code in 1980 as well as Seymour's Best and Fairest.

In 1981 McCarthy took up a captain/coach post at Broadford and achieved a history-making double Premiership for the Seniors and Reserves in 1982. In 1983 he coached and played for Avenel, winning the Best and Fairest in that year. McCarthy finished his career in the mid-eighties with short stints at Murchison and Euroa, eventually suffering a career-ending shoulder injury.

After finishing his football career, Bernie received acknowledgements including Assumption College Greatest-Ever VFL/AFL team and Seymour Team of the Century. He has also been able to impart his knowledge and expertise to young players via speaking engagements.

McCarthy died on 16 February 2019, aged 75, and is buried at Seymour Cemetery.

McCarthy is survived by 6 children and 13 grandchildren.

McCarthy often commented that if he could have kicked better he would have been twice as good. He was the master of understatement; he will remembered as one of the greats of the game and a true champion.
