= Panton Hill Football League =

Australian rules football league

- Most recent season or competition: 1987
- Sport: Australian rules football
- Founded: 1931
- First season: 1931
- Folded: 1987
- No. of teams: 6 (1987), 20 (historical)
- Country: Australia
- Last champion: Keon Park (1987)
- Most titles: Plenty Rovers/Mernda (11)
- Related competitions: Northern Football Netball League

The Panton Hill Football League was an Australian Rules football competition that ran from 1931 to 1987. The league originally consisted of clubs from rural areas north of Melbourne in the Shires of Eltham and Whittlesea, but later expanded to include clubs from Melbourne's northern suburbs.

== History ==
The PHFL was established in 1931 with four clubs (Panton Hill, Queenstown, Kinglake and Yarra Glen), before merging with the Bourke-Evelyn Football League a year later to bring in 3 more clubs. Due to the loss of numerous clubs to the Diamond Valley FL, the PHFL entered recess in 1937. It re-formed in 1939 and expanded to 5 teams before going into recess in 1941 due to World War II.

Following the war, the PHFL consistently had 9 to 10 participating clubs for the next 3 decades. Whittlesea won 4 premierships in a row between 1957 and 1960. The league began to expand into suburban Melbourne with the admissions of Lalor in 1964 and La Trobe University and Watsonia in 1967.

The loss of 4 clubs following the 1980 season marked the beginning of the PHFL's decline. Many clubs, particularly the strong Melbourne-based clubs, were increasingly drawn to the higher-standard Diamond Valley Football League. One of those clubs transferring to the DVFL was the Research Football Club in 1986. Historical details of that club can be found on their website at sites.google.com/view/rfchistory. A plan to turn the PHFL into a third division of the DVFL following the 1987 season fell through and the league subsequently folded, with Hurstbridge, Panton Hill and Reservoir Rovers joining the DVFL, Keon Park and Heidelberg Colts joining the Melbourne North FL and Coolaroo Rovers folding.

== Final clubs ==
Club	Jumper	Nickname	Home Ground	Former League	Est.	Years in PHFL	PHFL Senior Premierships		Fate
Club	Jumper	Nickname	Home Ground	Former League	Est.	Years in PHFL	Total	Years	Fate
Coolaroo Rovers	(1982-?)(?-1987)	Rovers	Progress Reserve, Coolaroo	VAFA	1970s	1982, 1984–1987	0	-	Recess in 1983. Seniors folded after 1987 season, juniors continued.
Heidelberg Colts		Colts	Olympic Park, Heidelberg West	PDJFA	1967	1984-1987	0	-	Entered recess in 1988, re-formed in Melbourne North FL in 1989
Hurstbridge		Bridges, Blues	Ben Frilay Memorial Oval, Hurstbridge	DVFL	1914	1932-1935, 1939–1987	5	1935, 1948, 1952, 1965, 1968, 1970	Played in Diamond Valley FL in 1936, recess in 1937–38. Moved to Diamond Valley FL in 1988
Keon Park		Tigers, Parkers	J C Donath Reserve, Reservoir	YCWFA	1961	1982-1987	1	1987	Entered recess in 1988, re-formed in Melbourne North FL in 1989
Panton Hill		Redbacks	Cracknell Reserve, Panton Hill	DVFL	1926	1931-1987	2	1934, 1955	Moved to Yarra Valley Mountain District FL in 1988
Reservoir Rovers		Rovers	C T Barling Reserve, Reservoir	YCWFA		1987	0	-	Merged with Thornbury to form Thornbury Rovers in Diamond Valley FL after 1987 season

== Former clubs ==
Club	Jumper	Nickname	Home Ground	Former League	Est.	Years in PHFL	PHFL Senior Premierships		Fate
Club	Jumper	Nickname	Home Ground	Former League	Est.	Years in PHFL	Total	Most recent	Fate
Bundoora		Bunnies, Bulls	Yulong Reserve, Bundoora	–	1974	1975-1980	1	1980	Moved to Diamond Valley FL following 1980 season
Donnybrook		Brookers	John Laffan Reserve, Donnybrook	HHFL	1910	1948-1980	5	1953, 1956, 1961, 1962, 1963	Folded after 1980 season
Flowerdale			Spring Valley Recreation Reserve, Flowerdale	YJFA	1890s	1949-1955	0	-	Folded after 1955 season
Kilmore		Blues	JJ Clancy Reserve, Kilmore	RDFL	1887	1985-1986	0	-	Returned to Riddell District FL following 1986 season
Kinglake		Lakers	Kinglake Memorial Reserve, Kinglake	BEFL	1925	1931-1936, 1939–1980	2	1939, 1940	Was in recess in 1937–38. Folded after 1980 season, re-formed in Yarra Valley Mountain District FL in 1990
La Trobe University	(Reds)(Blacks)	Trobers (1967) Reds and Blacks (1968–69)	Tony Sheehan Oval, Bundoora	–	1967	1967-1969	1	1969 (won by Blacks)	Moved to VAFA following 1969 season
Lalor		Bloods	Lalor Reserve, Lalor	–	1955	1964-1967	2	1966, 1967	Moved to Diamond Valley FL following 1967 season
Lower Plenty		Hawks	Montmorency Park, South Oval, Montmorency	ESCFA	1961	1983-1985	0	-	Returned to Eastern Suburban Churches FA in 1986
Mernda (Plenty Rovers 1932-64)	(1932-74)(1975–86)	Demons	Waterview Recreation Reserve, Mernda	BEFL	1891	1932-1936, 1940–1986	11	1936, 1947, 1949, 1950, 1951, 1964, 1971, 1981, 1982, 1983, 1986	Moved to Diamond Valley FL following 1986 season
Northcote Park		Cougars	McDonell Park, Northcote	MFL	1952	1973-1980	3	1977, 1978, 1979	Moved to Diamond Valley FL following 1980 season
Research		Bulldogs	Eltham Lower Park, Eltham	–	1958	1958-1985	2	1984, 1985	Moved to Diamond Valley FL following 1985 season
Reservoir		Mustangs	Crispe Park, Reservoir	MFL	1923	1971-1980	3	1972, 1975, 1976	Moved to Diamond Valley FL following 1980 season
St Andrews (Queenstown 1931-34)	(1931–34)(1947–84)	Tigers	St Andrews Recreation Reserve, St Andrews	–		1931-1934, 1947-1948, 1959-1964, 1967-1972, 1977-1984	0	-	In recess between 1935–1946, 1949–58, 1965–66 and 1973–76. Folded after 1984 season
St George’s Reservoir			CH Sullivan Memorial Park, Reservoir	ESCFA		1981-1982	0	-	Folded after 1982 season.
Thomastown		Bears	Main Street Reserve, Thomastown	–	1976	1976-1979	0	-	Moved to VAFA following 1979 season
Wallan (Wallan United 1949-63)		Magpies	Wallan Recreation Reserve, Wallan	RDFL	1904	1954-1964	0	-	Returned to Riddell District FL following 1964 season
Wallan East		Magpies		HHFL		1947-1949	0	-	Merged with Wallan to form Wallan United following 1948 season
Watsonia		Saints	A K Lines Reserve, Watsonia	–	1967	1967-1968	0	-	Moved to Diamond Valley FL following 1968 season
Whittlesea		Eagles	Whittlesea Showgrounds, Whittlesea	BEFL	1896	1932-1933, 1940, 1947–1986	8	1932, 1954, 1957, 1958, 1959, 1960, 1973, 1974	Moved to Diamond Valley FL in 1934 and 1946. Moved to Riddell District FL as Northern Eagles in 1987
Yarra Glen		River Pigs	Yarra Glen Recreation Reserve, Yarra Glen	YVFA	1888	1931-1934	2	1931, 1933	Returned to Yarra Valley FA in 1935

== Grand Finals ==
Year	Premiers	Score	Runners-up	Location	Ref.
1931	Yarra Glen		Kinglake	Kinglake	
1932	Whittlesea	10.12 (72) - 9.7 (61)	Yarra Glen	Hurstbridge	
1933	Yarra Glen	10.9 (79) - 4.11 (41)	Kinglake	Whittlesea	
1934	Panton Hill	11.11 (77) - 9.19 (73)	Yarra Glen	Hurstbridge	
1935	Hurstbridge	15.15 (105) - 7.8 (50)	Kinglake	Doreen	
1936	Plenty Rovers	11.9 (75) - 1.8 (14)	Kinglake	Whittlesea	
1937-38 - PHFL in recess
1939	Kinglake	11.12 (78) - 10.14 (74)	Hurstbridge	Hurstbridge	
1940	Kinglake	7.15 (57) - 7.12 (54)	Plenty Rovers	Whittlesea	
1941-46 - PHFL in recess due to WWII
1947	Plenty Rovers			Whittlesea	
1948	Hurstbridge	Score unknown - 9 point margin	Plenty Rovers	Whittlesea	
1949	Plenty Rovers			Whittlesea	
1950	Plenty Rovers			Whittlesea	
1951	Plenty Rovers			Whittlesea	
1952	Hurstbridge			Whittlesea	
1953	Donnybrook			Whittlesea	
1954	Whittlesea			Whittlesea	
1955	Panton Hill	7.11 (53) - 7.7 (49)	Donnybrook	Whittlesea	
1956	Donnybrook			Whittlesea	
1957	Whittlesea			Whittlesea	
1958	Whittlesea		Donnybrook	Whittlesea	
1959	Whittlesea			Whittlesea	
1960	Whittlesea		Donnybrook	Whittlesea	
1961	Donnybrook	13.12.90 - 12.13.85	Wallan	Whittlesea	
1962	Hurstbridge		Plenty Rovers	Whittlesea	
1963	Donnybrook		Plenty Rovers	Whittlesea	
1964	Plenty Rovers		Whittlesea	Whittlesea	
1965	Hurstbridge	15.12.102 - 11.9.75	Donnybrook	Whittlesea	
1966	Lalor	14.8 (92) - 8.11 (59)	Hurstbridge	Whittlesea	
1967	Drawn match - Lalor 15.11 (101) drew Hurstbridge 15.11 (101)			Whittlesea	
1967	Lalor	14.11 (95) - 8.10 (58)	Hurstbridge	Whittlesea	
1968	Hurstbridge	9.13.67 - 9.12.66	Mernda	Whittlesea	
1969	La Trobe University Blacks	20.10.130 - 6.10.46	Mernda	Whittlesea	
1970	Hurstbridge	15.5 (95) - 10.15 (75)	Panton Hill	Whittlesea	
1971	Mernda	14.10.94 - 7.7.49	Reservoir	Whittlesea	
1972	Reservoir	11.19 (85) - 10.13 (73)	Donnybrook	Whittlesea	
1973	Whittlesea	14.8.92 - 13.9.87	Reservoir	Whittlesea	
1974	Whittlesea	12.11.83 - 13.2.80	Northcote Park	Whittlesea	
1975	Reservoir	13.10.88 - 9.6.60	Research	Whittlesea	
1976	Reservoir	19.13.127 - 16.10.106	Northcote Park	Whittlesea	
1977	Northcote Park	21.14.140 - 10.13.73	Reservoir	Whittlesea	
1978	Northcote Park	17.19.121 - 12.9.81	Bundoora	Whittlesea	
1979	Northcote Park	17.14.116 - 15.22.112	Bundoora	Whittlesea	
1980	Bundoora	24.15.159 - 16.20.116	Northcote Park	Whittlesea	
1981	Mernda	13.10.88 - 9.19.73	Hurstbridge	Whittlesea	
1982	Mernda	19.14.128 - 15.14.104	Research	Whittlesea	
1983	Mernda	11.24.90 - 13.6.84	Keon Park	Whittlesea	
1984	Research	23.19.157 - 16.10.106	Mernda	Whittlesea	
1985	Research	13.8.86 - 12.8.80	Mernda	Whittlesea	
1986	Mernda	13.21.99 - 14.12.96	Keon Park	Whittlesea	
1987	Keon Park	16.14.110 - 15.10.100	Coolaroo Rovers	Hurstbridge	
