= Harry Verdon =

Australian rules footballer, born 1909

Personal information
- Full name: Harold Verdon
- Born: 7 October 1909
- Died: 4 June 1996 (aged 86)
- Original teams: Lilydale, Yea

Playing career^{1}
Years	Club	Games (Goals)
1927	St Kilda	2 (3)
1931	Fitzroy	1 (3)
Total		3 (6)
- ^{1} Playing statistics correct to the end of 1931.

Harry Verdon (7 October 1909 – 4 June 1996) was an Australian rules footballer who played with St Kilda and Fitzroy in the Victorian Football League (VFL).

Verdon was recruited to St. Kilda, from Lilydale in 1927, after kicking nearly 60 goals.

Verdon was recruited to Fitzroy, via Yea in 1931.
