= Croydon Football Club =

Croydon Football Netball Club

Names
- Full name: Croydon Football Netball Club
- Nickname: Blues

2025 season
- Home-and-away season: 8th (7 wins, 11 losses)
- Leading goalkicker: Blake Podesta (25)
- Best and fairest: Riley Britton

Club details
- Founded: 1906; 120 years ago
- Colours
- Competition: Eastern Football Netball League
- President: Anthony Thompson
- Coach: Rhett Jordan
- Premierships: 1926, 1937, 1946, 1948, 1960, 1971, 1997
- Ground: Croydon Park Reserve (capacity: 5,000)

Uniforms
Home	Away

Other information
- Official website: Croydon FNC website

The Croydon Football Netball Club is an Australian rules football and netball club, founded in 1906. It is based in the eastern suburbs of Melbourne, Victoria, Australia and is part of the Eastern Football League, with their home ground base situated at Croydon Park Reserve.

== Senior club history ==
The Croydon Football Club was formed in 1906 and joined the Reporter Football Association competition and played there up until 1919, when they played in the Yarra Valley Football League in 1920 and 1921.

The club then played in the Box Hill Reporter Football Association in 1922 and 1923, transferring back to the Yarra Valley Football League for 1925 and 1926, winning a premiership in 1926, then onto the Ringwood District Football Association in 1927, where they remained until 1940.

After World War II, the Ringwood District Football Association was superseded by Croydon Mail District Football League, which later evolved into the Eastern Football League in 1962.

The club was a foundation member of the Eastern Football League in 1962 when this league came about due to the transfer of clubs from the Croydon-Ferntree Gully Football League and the Eastern Suburbs.

== Football Timeline ==
- 1906 - 1911: Reporter District Football Association
- 1912 - Reporter District Football Association (Croydon - Kilsyth FC)
- 1913 - ? The fixture has "Kilsyth FC", but not Croydon - Kilsyth FC
- 1914 -
- 1913 - 1915: Reporter District Football Association
- 1916 - 1918: In recess due to WW1
- 1919: Reporter District Football League
- 1920 & 1921: Yarra Valley Football League
- 1922 & 1923: Reporter District Football League
- 1924 - 1926: Yarra Valley Football League
- 1927 - 1940: Ringwood District Football Association
- 1941 - 1944: In recess due to World War Two
- 1945 - 1949: Croydon Mail District Football League
- 1950 - 1961: Croydon Ferntree Gully Football League
- 1962 - 2026: Eastern Football League

== Premierships ==
Senior Football

- Yarra Valley Football League
  - 1926 - Croydon: 14.14 - 96 d Lilydale: 10.18 - 78 At Walker Park, Nunawading.
- Ringwood District Football League
  - 1937 - Croydon: 13.12 - 90 d Ringwood: 10.21 - 81 played at Mitcham
- Croydon Mail Football League
  - 1946 - Croydon: 12.7 - 79 d Bayswater: 4.16 - 40 At Croydon Oval
  - 1948 - Croydon: d Lilydale at East Ringwood At East Ringwood Reserve
- Croydon Ferntree Gully Football League
  - 1960 - Croydon: 11.8 - 74 d Ringwood: 6.12 - 48. At Croydon Oval.
- Eastern Football League - Division Two - (ran from 1956 to 2018)
  - 1971 - Croydon: 20.19 - 139 d Bayswater: 9.14 - 68. At Croydon Oval
  - 1997 - Croydon: 14.14 - 98 d Mooroolbark: 8.5 - 53. At East Burwood Reserve

Reserves Football

- Croydon Ferntree Gully Football League
  - 1947 - Croydon: 10.11 - 71 d Lilydale: 8.10 - 58
- Eastern Football League - Division One
  - 1973
- Eastern Football League - Division Two
  - 1989, 1991, 2017,

Under 18's

- Eastern Football League - Division One
  - 1980
- Eastern Football League - Division Two
  - 1990, 1991, 2024,

Under 17's

- Eastern Football League - Section C
  - 2013

Under 16's

- Eastern Football League - Section A
  - 1988
- Eastern Football League - Section B
  - 2002

Under 15's

- Eastern Football League - Section A
  - 1974

Under 14's

- Eastern Football League - Section A
  - 1967, 1980, 2001,
- Eastern Football League - Section B
  - 1986, 1987, 2005,

Under 13's

- Eastern Football League - Section A
  - 1975, 1996, 2000, 2012,
- Eastern Football League - Section B
  - 2017,

Veterans

- Eastern Football League
  - 2013, 2014,

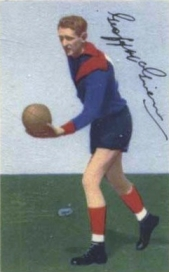
Geoff McGivern, 1953

== VFL/AFL players ==
The following footballers played with Croydon, prior to playing senior football in the VFL/AFL, and / or drafted, with the year indicating their VFL/AFL debut.

- 1950 - Geoff McGivern - Melbourne
- 1985 - Brett Stephens - Fitzroy
- 1989 - Craig Devonport - St Kilda, Carlton
- 2000 - Damian Cupido - Essendon
- 2005 - Matthew Bate - Melbourne

== League Best and Fairest Winners ==
- Croydon Ferntree Gully Football League
  - 1958 - Geoff McGivern
- Eastern Football League - Division Two
  - 1988 - Ross Watson

== League Leading Goalkicker ==
- Eastern Football League - Premier / (Division One: 1956 to 2018)
  - 1962 - Roger Mansfield: 72
  - 1963 - Roger Mansfield: 68
  - 1966 - John Ridge: 62
  - 1975 - Chris King: 75
  - 1976 - Chris King: 97
  - 2009 - Brad Kelleher: 74
- Eastern Football League - Division One (Known as Division Two - 1956 to 2018)
  - 2021 - Riley Constantino: 30

Reserves Football

- Croydon Ferntree Gully Football League
  - 1947 - Geoff McGivern: 105

== Netball ==
Premierships

- EDFNL - Premier Division
  - 2025 - Croydon: 61 d East Ringwood: 46

== Links ==
- Croydon FNC - Facebook
- 1937 - Ringwood District FA Premiers: Croydon FC team photo
- 1960 - Eastern Districts FL Premiers: Croydon FC team photo
