= Yarra Ranges Football & Netball League =

Australian sports organisation

- Most recent season or competition: 2018
- Formerly: Yarra Valley Mountain District Football League (1966–2015)
- Sport: Australian rules football
- Founded: 2016
- No. of teams: 28
- Country: Australia
- Most titles: Div 1 - Woori Yallock (14)
- Website: YVMDFL

The AFL Yarra Ranges was an Australian rules football and netball organisation based in the Yarra Valley and Dandenong Ranges within Victoria. The organisation operated the Yarra Ranges Senior Football league and the Yarra Ranges Junior Football league between 2016 and 2018.

== History ==
The Yarra Valley Mountain District Football League was formed in 1966, from the amalgamation of the Mountain District Football League (1922–1965) and the Yarra Valley Football League (1909–1965).

Most of the teams in the league are based in the outer fringes of north-east and east Melbourne. However, the addition in recent years of Thornton-Eildon, Yea and Alexandra from the Kyabram District Football League has seen the league expand into the Goulburn Valley area of central Victoria.

South Belgrave transferred to the Eastern Football League for the 2008 season, followed by Silvan for the 2011 season. Thornton-Eildon Football Club went into recess at the start of 2011.

In 2016, following a review, the league decided to change its name to the AFL Yarra Ranges. At the conclusion of the 2018 season, the league merged with the South East Football Netball League to form the Outer East Football Netball League.

== Structure ==
Clubs fielded football teams in seniors, reserves and under-18s. Clubs played in a two division structure in both the seniors and reserves, with the club winning the senior flag in division two promoted and the bottom division one senior club relegated each season. Since 2013, the under-18s has been played as a single division. A netball competition was introduced in 2005, with the competition subsequently expanded to cater for A, B and C grades.

=== Timeline ===
- 1966 - 2015: Yarra Valley Mountain District Football League
- 2016 - 2018: Yarra Ranges Football & Netball League
- 2019–present day: Outer East Football Netball League

== Clubs ==
=== Final clubs ===
==== Division One ====
Club	Colours	Nickname	Home Ground	Former League	Est.	Years in YVMDFL	YVMDFL Senior Premierships	
Club	Colours	Nickname	Home Ground	Former League	Est.	Years in YVMDFL	Total	Years
Belgrave		Magpies	Belgrave Recreation Reserve, Belgrave	MDFA	1909	1966–2018	5	Div 1: 1975, 1976; Div 2: 1999, 2012, 2017
Emerald		Bombers	Chandler Recreation Reserve, Emerald	MDFA	1905	1966–2018	4	Div 2: 1981, 1983, 1997, 2015
Healesville		Bloods	Don Road Sporting Complex, Healesville	YVFL	1888	1966–2018	8	Div 1: 1968, 1969, 1972, 1977, 1985, 1988, 2016; Div 2: 2013
Monbulk		Hawks	Monbulk Recreation Reserve, Monbulk	MDFA	1895	1966–2018	7	Div 1: 1983, 1997, 1998, 2005, 2006; Div 2: 1987, 1991
Mount Evelyn		Rovers	Mount Evelyn Recreation Reserve, Mount Evelyn	EFNL	1931	2002–2018	0	–
Olinda-Ferny Creek		Bloods	Olinda Recreation Reserve, Olinda	EFNL	1908	1986–2018	4	Div 1: 2017; Div 2: 1988, 2005, 2009
Upwey-Tecoma		Tigers	Upwey Recreation Reserve, Upwey	MDFA	1946	1966–2018	12	Div 1: 1966, 1967, 1978, 1980, 1989, 1990, 1991, 1993, 1994, 1999, 2009, 2011
Wandin		Bulldogs	Wandin North Recreation Reserve, Wandin North	EFNL	1909	1972–2018	6	Div 1: 1992, 2001, 2002, 2015; Div 2: 1978, 1979
Warburton-Millgrove		Burras	Mac Sparke Oval, Warburton	–	1967	1967–2018	3	Div 1: 1995, 2000; Div 2: 2006
Woori Yallock		Tigers	Woori Yallock Recreation Reserve, Woori Yallock	YVFL	1905	1966–2018	12	Div 1: 1970, 1971, 1973, 1974, 1981, 1984, 1987, 2003, 2010, 2012, 2013, 2014

==== Division Two ====
Club	Colours	Nickname	Home Ground	Former League	Est.	Years in YVMDFL	YVMDFL Senior Premierships	
Club	Colours	Nickname	Home Ground	Former League	Est.	Years in YVMDFL	Total	Years
Alexandra	(1977-?)(?-2018)	Rebels	Alexandra Showgrounds, Alexandra	WNEFA, CGFL	1884	1977–1985, 2006–2018	2	Div 2: 1980, 2008
Gembrook Cockatoo (Gembrook 1966-96)		Brookers	Gembrook Recreation Reserve, Gembrook	MDFA	1906	1966–2018	4	Div 1: 1986 Div 2: 2000, 2004, 2016
Kinglake		Lakers	Kinglake Memorial Oval, Kinglake	PHFL, NFNL	1930	1990–1995, 2008–2018	1	Div 2: 1994
Powelltown		Demons	Powelltown Recreation Reserve, Powelltown	YVFL	1922	1966–2018	1	Div 2: 1989
Seville		Blues	Seville Recreation Reserve, Seville	–	1972	1972–2018	4	Div 1: 1982, 1996; Div 2: 1995, 2003
Thornton-Eildon		Shinboners	Thornton Recreation Reserve, Thornton	CGFL	1951	1977–1985, 2006–2010, 2014–2018	1	Div 2: 2007
Yarra Glen		River Pigs	Yarra Glen Recreation Reserve, Yarra Glen	EFNL	1888	1985–2018	5	Div 2: 1993, 1998, 2001, 2010, 2014
Yarra Junction		Eagles	Yarra Junction Memorial Reserve, Yarra Junction	YVFL	1909	1966–2018	3	Div 2: 1986, 1990, 2018
Yea		Tigers	Yea Showgrounds, Yea	WNEFA, KDFNL	1893	1977–1985, 2008–2018	2	Div 2: 1982, 1984

=== Former clubs ===
Club	Colours	Nickname	Home Ground	Former League	Est.	Years in YVMDFL	YVMDFL Senior Premierships		Fate
Club	Colours	Nickname	Home Ground	Former League	Est.	Years in YVMDFL	Total	Years	Fate
Boronia Park		Bombers	Miller Park, Boronia	SFNL	1990	2000–2001	0	-	Folded after 2001 season.
Fairpark		Lions	Fairpark Reserve, Ferntree Gully	–	1969	1978–1980	0	-	Transferred to Eastern District FL in 1981
Marysville		Villains	Gallipoli Park, Marysville	YVFL	1931	1966–1983	1	Div 2: 1973	Folded in 1983
Millgrove			Millgrove Recreation Reserve, Millgrove	YVFL	1906	1966	0	-	Merged with Warburton in 1967 to form Warburton-Millgrove
North Croydon		Kangaroos	Brushy Creek Park, Croydon North	EFNL	1984	1991–1998	0	-	Folded in 1999
Panton Hill		Redbacks	A.E. Cracknell Reserve, Panton Hill	PHFL	1926	1988–1996	0	-	Transferred to Diamond Valley FL in 1997
Silvan		Cats	Silvan Recreation Ground, Silvan	CFGFL	1921	1966–2010	5	Div 1: 2004, 2007, 2008; Div 2: 1992, 2002	Transferred to Eastern FL in 2011
South Belgrave		Saints	Belgrave South Recreation Reserve, Belgrave	MDFA, EDFL, SWGFL	1946	1966–1968, 1970–1977, 1983–2007	3	Div 2: 1976, 1977, 1996	Played in Eastern Districts FL in 1969. Played in South West Gippsland FL between 1978-82. Returned to Eastern FL in 2008
Warburton		Magpies	Mac Sparke Oval, Warburton	YVFL	1906	1966	0	-	Merged with Millgrove in 1967 to form Warburton-Millgrove
Worawa			Worawa Aboriginal College Oval, Healesville	–	2001	2001–2003	0	-	Folded after 2003 season.

== Premierships ==
=== Division 1 ===
YVMDFL - 1966 to 1972.
Division One - 1972 to 2018.

Year	Seniors	Reserves	Under 18s
2018	Wandin	Mount Evelyn	Gembrook Cockatoo
2017	Olinda-Ferny Creek	Wandin	Wandin
2016	Healesville	Olinda-Ferny Creek	Mount Evelyn
2015	Wandin	Upwey-Tecoma	Healesville
2014	Woori Yallock	Upwey-Tecoma	Healesville
2013	Woori Yallock	Upwey-Tecoma	Woori Yallock
2012	Woori Yallock	Healesville	Wandin
2011	Upwey-Tecoma	Warburton-Millgrove	Upwey-Tecoma
2010	Woori Yallock	Monbulk	Olinda-Ferny Creek
2009	Upwey-Tecoma	Upwey-Tecoma	Monbulk
2008	Silvan	Upwey-Tecoma	Warburton-Millgrove
2007	Silvan	Warburton-Millgrove	Healesville
2006	Monbulk	Upwey-Tecoma	Upwey-Tecoma
2005	Monbulk	Upwey-Tecoma	Healesville
2004	Silvan	Upwey-Tecoma	Woori Yallock
2003	Woori Yallock	Healesville	Upwey-Tecoma
2002	Wandin	Upwey-Tecoma	Upwey-Tecoma
2001	Wandin	Healesville	Upwey-Tecoma
2000	Warburton-Millgrove	Wandin	Upwey-Tecoma
1999	Upwey-Tecoma	Woori Yallock	Healesville
1998	Monbulk	Upwey-Tecoma	Woori Yallock
1997	Monbulk	Woori Yallock	Woori Yallock
1996	Seville	Woori Yallock	Woori Yallock
1995	Warburton-Millgrove	Woori Yallock	Woori Yallock
1994	Upwey-Tecoma	Warburton-Millgrove	Upwey-Tecoma
1993	Upwey-Tecoma	Healesville	Upwey-Tecoma
1992	Wandin	Woori Yallock	Monbulk
1991	Upwey-Tecoma	Warburton/Millgrove	Upwey-Tecoma
1990	Upwey-Tecoma	Woori Yallock	Woori Yallock
1989	Upwey-Tecoma	Healesville	Upwey-Tecoma
1988	Healesville		
1987	Woori Yallock	Healesville	
1986	Gembrook	Healesville	Wandin
1985	Healesville		
1984	Woori Yallock	Woori Yallock	Woori Yallock
1983	Monbulk		
1982	Seville		
1981	Woori Yallock	Upwey-Tecoma	
1980	Upwey-Tecoma	Upwey-Tecoma	
1979	Upwey-Tecoma	Wandin	woori Yallock
1978	Upwey-Tecoma		
1977	Healesville		
1976	Belgrave		
1975	Belgrave		
1974	Woori Yallock	Yarra Junction	Belgrave
1973	Woori Yallock	Monbulk	Healesville
1972	Healesville		
1971	Woori Yallock		
1970	Woori Yallock	Upwey Tecoma	Healesville
1969	Healesville	Warburton/Millgrove	Warburton/Millgrove
1968	Healesville		
1967	Upwey-Tecoma		Healesville
1966	Upwey-Tecoma	Healesville	Healesville
Year	A. Grade	B. Grade	C. Grade

Total Premierships Won. 1989 to 2018
Club	Seniors	Reserves	Under 18s	Total
Woori Yallock	13	8	9	30
Upwey-Tecoma	12	13	11	36
Healesville	7	8	8	23
Monbulk	5	2	1	8
Warburton-Millgrove	2	4	2	8
Seville	2	1	2	5
Silvan	3	0	0	3
Wandin	3	2	4	9
Belgrave	2	0	0	2
Emerald	0	0	1	1
Gembrook Cockatoo	1	0	0	1
Olinda-Ferny Creek	1	1	1	3
TOTAL	51			

=== Division 2 ===
1972 to 2018

Year	Seniors	Reserves	Under 18s
2018	Yarra Junction	Seville	Gembrook Cockatoo
2017	Belgrave	Belgrave	
2016	Gembrook-Cockatoo	Yarra Glen	
2015	Emerald	Yarra Junction	
2014	Yarra Glen	Seville	
2013	Healesville	Healesville	
2012	Belgrave	Seville	Seville
2011	Emerald	Seville	Seville
2010	Yarra Glen	Seville	Emerald
2009	Olinda-Ferny Creek	Olinda-Ferny Creek	Olinda-Ferny Creek
2008	Alexandra	Alexandra	Emerald
2007	Thornton Eildon	Alexandra	Yarra Junction
2006	Warburton-Millgrove	Warburton-Millgrove	South Belgrave
2005	Olinda-Ferny Creek	South Belgrave	
2004	Gembrook-Cockatoo	South Belgrave	
2003	Seville	Yarra Junction	
2002	Silvan	Yarra Junction	South Belgrave
2001	Yarra Glen	Yarra Junction	
2000	Warburton-Millgrove	Gembrook-Cockatoo	Emerald
1999	Belgrave	Yarra Junction	
1998	Yarra Glen	Yarra Junction	
1997	Emerald	Emerald	
1996	South Belgrave		
1995	Seville		
1994	Kinglake		
1993	Yarra Glen		
1992	Silvan		
1991	Monbulk		
1990	Yarra Junction		
1989	Powelltown		
1988	Olinda-Ferny Creek		
1987	Monbulk	Monbulk	
1986	Yarra Junction		
1985	Wandin		
1984	Yea		
1983	Emerald		
1982	Yea		
1981	Emerald		
1980	Alexandra		
1979	Wandin		
1978	Wandin		
1977	South Belgrave		
1976	South Belgrave		
1975	Yarra Junction		
1974	Yarra Junction	?	?
1973	Marysville	Emerald	Wandin
1972	Seville		

Total Premierships Won
Club	Seniors	Reserves	Under 18s	Total
Belgrave	3	4	7	14
Emerald	5	2	5	12
Wandin	3	5	1	9
Yarra Junction	3	6	2	11
South Belgrave	1	3	3	7
Alexandra	2	3	0	5
Seville	3	7	2	12
Powelltown	1	3	1	5
Monbulk	2	1	1	4
Gembrook-Cockatoo	2	1	0	3
Olinda-Ferny Creek	3	1	1	5
Silvan	2	0	0	2
Yea	2	0	0	2
Thornton Eildon^{a}	1	0	1	2
Warburton-Millgrove	1	1	0	2
Yarra Glen	2	0	0	2
Kinglake	1	0	0	1
Healesville	1	1	0	2
Fairpark	0	0	2	2

^{a} Under 18s won as Thornton

=== Division 3 ===
1974 to 1977

Results 1974 - 1977
Year	Seniors	Reserves	Under 18s
1974	Belgrave 2nds		
1975	Monbulk 2nds		
1976	Healesville 2nds		
1977	Upwey-Tecoma 2nds		
