= Yarra Valley Football League =

Minor country football league in Australia

- Most recent season or competition: 1965
- Formerly: Yarra Valley Football Association (1909–1946)
- Sport: Australian rules football
- Founded: 1909; 117 years ago
- First season: 1909
- Folded: 1965; 61 years ago
- No. of teams: 29
- Country: Australia
- Most titles: Millgrove FC (11)
- Related competitions: Yarra Valley Mountain District Football League, Yarra Ranges Football / Netball League & Outer East Football Netball League

The Yarra Valley Football Association was an Australian rules football competition formed in 1909 and ended in 1965.

== History ==
The Yarra Valley Football Association was formed in 1909 and ran until 1965 as a one division football competition.

Australian Rules Football competitions in the Yarra Valley commenced as far back as 1891, with the Clement Brothers Trophy, which was won by Yarra Glen, with a number of different competitions and associations being formed in the area between 1891 and 1913.

There was a number of minor name changes in the competition's name between 1909 and 1914, mainly due to which local business or donor sponsored the premiership trophy in any given football season.

In 1926, Powelltown, Warburton and Yarra Junction clubs joined the YVFA from the Upper Yarra Football Association.

In 1933, Yarra Junction went through the season undefeated, up until the grand final, but lost the match to Warburton by 11 points.

Three playing members within the Yarra Valley Football Association lost their lives in the 1939 bush fire holocaust on 13 January 1939.

The Yarra Valley Football Association changed its name to the Yarra Valley Football League at its annual general meeting in March, 1947 and ran until 1965.

The Yarra Valley Mountain District Football League was formed in 1966, from the amalgamation of the Mountain District Football League (1922 - 1965) and the Yarra Valley Football League (1909–1965).

The following YVFL clubs joined the YVMDFL in 1966 - Healesville, Marysville, Millgrove, Powelltown, Warburton, Woori Yallock and Yarra Junction.

In 2016, following a review by AFL Victoria, the league decided to change its name to the AFL Yarra Ranges. After another review of local football at the conclusion of the 2018 season, AFL Victoria decided that the league should merge with the South East Football Netball League to form the Outer East Football Netball League.

=== Timeline ===
- 1909 - Yarra Valley Football Association
- 1914 - 1915: Yarra Valley Football Association
- 1916 - 1918: YVFA in recess, due to WW1
- 1919 - 1941: Yarra Valley Football Association
- 1942 - 1944: YVFA in recess, due to WW2
- 1945 - 1946: Yarra Valley Football Association
- 1947 - 1965: Yarra Valley Football League
- 1966 - 2015: Yarra Valley Mountain District Football League
- 2016 - 2018: Yarra Ranges Football & Netball League
- 2019: Outer East Football Netball League
- 2020: OEFNL in recess, due to COVID-19
- 2021–present day: Outer East Football Netball League

== Clubs ==
=== Final clubs ===
Club	Colours	Nickname	Home Ground	Former League	Est.	Years in YVFL	YVFL Senior Premierships		Fate
Club	Colours	Nickname	Home Ground	Former League	Est.	Years in YVFL	Total	Years	Fate
Healesville	(1920s)(?-1965)	Ramblers, Redlegs, Bloods	Don Road Sporting Complex, Healesville	–	1888	1909-1965	7	1920, 1945, 1951, 1954, 1962, 1964, 1965	Formed Yarra Valley Mountain District FL in 1966
Marysville	(1950s)(?-1965)	Villains	Gallipoli Park, Marysville	UGFL	1931	1949-1965	2	1959, 1960	Formed Yarra Valley Mountain District FL in 1966
Millgrove			Millgrove Recreation Reserve, Millgrove	UYVFA	1906	1909, 1914–1915, 1925-1965	11	1914, 1925, 1928, 1930, 1932, 1939, 1940, 1956, 1957, 1961, 1963	Played in Upper Yarra Valley FA between 1910-13 and 1920-24. Formed Yarra Valley Mountain District FL in 1966
Powelltown		Demons	Powelltown Recreation Reserve, Powelltown	UYVFA	1922	1926, 1928-1965	0	-	Merged with Yarra Junction in 1927 to form Little Yarra Rovers. Formed Yarra Valley Mountain District FL in 1966
Warburton		Magpies	Mac Sparke Oval, Warburton	UYVFA	1906	1909, 1926-1965	7	1933, 1937, 1948, 1949, 1952, 1953, 1958	Played in Upper Yarra Valley FA between 1910-25. Formed Yarra Valley Mountain District FL in 1966
Woori Yallock		Tigers	Woori Yallock Recreation Reserve, Woori Yallock	UYVFA	1905	1909, 1921–1922, 1924–1927, 1930–1955, 1963–1965	1	1947	Played in Upper Yarra Valley FA in 1920 and 1923. 1928-29 unknown. Merged with Wandin and Seville to form Valley United in 1956. Formed Yarra Valley Mountain District FL in 1966.
Yarra Junction		Eagles	Yarra Junction Memorial Reserve, Yarra Junction	UYVFA	1909	1915, 1926, 1928-1954, 1962–1965	6	1929, 1931, 1934, 1935, 1941, 1950	Played in Upper Yarra Valley FA from 1916-25. Merged with Powelltown to form Little Yarra Rovers in 1927. Merged with Wesburn in 1955 to form Yarraburn until 1961. Formed Yarra Valley Mountain District FL in 1966.

=== Former clubs ===
Club	Colours	Nickname	Home Ground	Former League	Est.	Years in YVFL	YVFL Senior Premierships		Fate
Club	Colours	Nickname	Home Ground	Former League	Est.	Years in YVFL	Total	Years	Fate
Badger Creek			Coranderrk Aboriginal Station, Healesville	–	1890s	1910-1911	1	1911	Folded after 1911 season
Coldstream		Cougars	Halley Supple Reserve, Coldstream	–	1952	1952-1955	0	-	Moved to Croydon-Ferntree Gully FL in 1956
Coldstream (original)				–	1890	1911-1914	0	-	Merged with Yarra Glen in 1915 to form Coldstream/Yarra Glen. Did not reform post-WW1.
Coldstream/Yarra Glen				–	1915	1915	0	-	De-merged into Yarra Glen and Coldstream
Croydon			Croydon Oval, Croydon	RDFA	1906	1920-1921, 1925–1926	1	1926	1922 unknown. Played in Reporter District FA in 1923. Joined Ringwood District FA in 1927.
Kilsyth/Montrose				–	1923	1923	0	-	De-merged into Kilsyth and Montrose in 1924.
Lilydale		Falcons	Lilydale Recreation Reserve, Lilydale	CFGFL	1872	1909-1939, 1945–1946, 1953–1955, 1957–1964	8	1915, 1919, 1922, 1923, 1924, 1936, 1938, 1946	Joined Ringwood District FA in 1940. Joined Croydon Mail FL in 1947. Joined Croydon-Ferntree Gully FL in 1956. Joined Eastern Districts FL in 1965.
Little Yarra Rovers				–	1926	1927	2	1927	De-merged into Powelltown and Yarra Junction in 1928
Monbulk		Hawks	Monbulk Recreation Reserve, Monbulk	BDFA	1895	1937-1938	0	-	Merged with Olinda to form Olinda-Monbulk in Ringwood District FA in 1939. Re-formed in Mountain District FA in 1945
Montrose			Montrose Recreation Reserve, Montrose	–	1922	1922, 1924–1926	0	-	Merged with Kilsyth in 1923 to form Kilsyth/Montrose. Folded after 1926 season
Mount Evelyn			Mount Evelyn Recreation Reserve, Mount Evelyn	CFGFL	1931	1946-1953, 1955	0	-	Played 2nds & 3rds in Croydon-Ferntree Gully FL in 1954. Withdrew from the YVFA prior to Rd.2, 1955. Re-formed in Croydon-Ferntree Gully FL in 1957.
Saint Hubert's						1910	0	-	Folded
Seville	(1915) (1933-38)	Bloods	Seville Recreation Reserve, Seville	CMFL	1915	1915, 1921, 1933–1938, 1950, 1955	0	-	Recessin 1916-19, 1922-32 and 1939-47. Re-formed in Croydon-Ferntree Gully FL in 1948, returned there in 1951. Merged with Wandin and Woori Yallock in 1956 to form Valley United.
Silvan			Silvan Recreation Ground, Silvan	MDFA	1920	1925–1929, 1935–1939	0	-	Moved to Mountain District FA in 1930. Played merged with Mt Evelyn in 1940, re-formed in Mountain District FA in 1946.
Silvan/Evelyn				–	1940	1940	0	-	Had one season only as a combined club in 1940.
Toolangi			Cow paddock in Castella	–	1952	1952-1953	0	-	Only played reserves. Left YVFL 5 weeks into 1953 season.
Upper Yarra Dam		Cats	Upper Yarra Reservoir Park, Reefton	–	1953	1953-1955	0	-	Withdrew from the YVFL prior to Rd.3, 1955.
Valley United			Seville Recreation Reserve, Seville	–	1956	1956-1959	0	-	De-merged into Wandin, Woori Yallock and Seville following 1959 season.
Wandin			Wandin North Recreation Reserve, Wandin North	YVJFA	1909	1915-1926, 1928-1954	0	-	Moved to Yarra Valley Junior FA in 1927. Forced out of the YVFL in 1955 as they could only field a reserves side. Merged with Seville & Woori Yallock to form Valley United in 1956. Joined the Croydon-Ferntree Gully FL in 1959.
Wesburn		Bulldogs	Wesburn Park, Wesburn	–	1946	1946-1954	0	-	Forced to merge by the YVFL with Yarra Junction in 1955 to form Yarraburn.
Yarraburn			Yarra Junction Memorial Reserve, Yarra Junction	–	1955	1955-1961	0	1955	De-merged into Wesburn and Yarra Junction in 1962
Yarra Glen		River Pigs	Yarra Glen Recreation Reserve, Yarra Glen	PHFL	1888	1909, 1914–1930, 1935, 1939–1940, 1947–1955	2	1909, 1921	Formed Panton Hill FA in 1931. Recess from 1936-38. Moved to Croydon-Ferntree Gully FL in 1956
Yarra Rovers			Mac Sparke Oval, Warburton (based at East Warburton)	–	1935	1935-1938	0	-	Withdrew following 1938 season

== Senior football grand finals ==
There was a number of minor name changes in the competition's name between 1909 and 1914, mainly due to which local business or donor sponsored the premiership trophy in any given football season.

YVFA/YVFL's official seasons were only in 1909, 1914 - 1946, then 1947 to 1965.

Seniors:	Senior Football - Grand Finals				
Year	Premiers	Scores	Runner up	Scores	Venue / Comments
Clements Bros Trophy
1891	Yarra Glen		Lilydale		
District Press Trophy FA
1906	Lilydale	1st			No final series
Upper Yarra FA / Gascoigne Trophy
1907	Woori Yallock	1st	Millgrove	2nd	
Yarra Glen & Lilydale FA: (Stevens Trophy, Olinda Hotel, Lilydale)
1908	Yarra Glen				Richard Stevens Trophy
Yarra Valley Football Association
1909	Yarra Glen	6.9 - 45	Lilydale	4.10 - 34	Yarra Glen
Yarra Valley Football Association: Mr. Tymm's Trophy
1910	Lilydale		Yarra Glen		Lilydale, undefeated premiers
Yarra Valley Football Association: (Richard Stevens Trophy, Olinda Hotel, Lilydale)
1911	Badger Creek	5.7 - 37	Healesville	2.4 - 16	Lilydale
Coldstream, Yarra Glen & Healesville District FA
1912	Healesville	1st			
Yarra Flats Football Association
1913	Lilydale	2.7 - 19	Healesville	2.3 - 15	
Yarra Valley Football Association
1914	Healesville	6.5 - 41	Millgrove	5.10 - 40	1st Grand Final at Lilydale
	Millgrove	8.3 - 51	Healesville	6.10 - 46	2nd G Final @ Lilydale due to protest
1915	Lilydale	3.12 - 30	Yarra Junction	3.1 - 19	Healesville
1916-18					In recess > WW1
1919	Lilydale	4.4 - 28	Healesville	3.9 - 27	Yarra Glen
1920	Healesville	3.7 - 25	Lilydale	2.11 - 33	
1921	Yarra Glen	7.9 - 51	Lilydale	2.11 - 23	Yarra Glen
1922	Lilydale	9.11 - 65	Healesville	7.7 - 49	Yarra Glen
1923	Lilydale	4.19 - 43	Healesville	4.8 - 32	Lilydale
1924	Lilydale	9.14 - 68	Montrose	6.15 - 51	Healesville
1925	Millgrove	8.13 - 61	Croydon	7.10 - 52	Lilydale
1926	Croydon	14.14 - 96	Lilydale	10.18 - 78	Healesville
1927 - Peter Dawson Whisky Trophy
1927	Little Yarra Rovers	13.3 - 81	Millgrove	9.7 - 61	Warburton
1928 - Barrington's Olinda Hotel Trophy
1928	Millgrove	13.11 - 89	Warburton	8.11 - 59	Healesville
1929	Yarra Junction	14.14 - 98	Lilydale	14.8 - 86	Warburton
1930	Millgrove	7.11 - 53	Powelltown	7.8 - 50	Warburton
1931	Yarra Junction	12.7 - 79	Millgrove	9.13 - 67	Warburton
1932	Millgrove	14.10 - 94	Warburton	10.14 - 74	Yarra Junction
1933	Warburton	16.11 - 107	Yarra Junction	15.6 - 96	Warburton
1934	Yarra Junction	10.20 - 80	Powelltown	5.4 - 34	Lilydale
1935	Yarra Junction	13.15 - 93	Powelltown	13.13 - 91	Warburton
1936	Lilydale	9.14 - 68	Silvan	8.19 - 67	Warburton
1937	Warburton	17.19 - 121	Lilydale	11.12 - 78	Healesville
1938	Lilydale	17.15 - 117	Warburton	13.15 - 93	Yarra Junction
1939	Millgrove	16.9 - 105	Warburton	5.16 - 46	Yarra Junction
1940	Millgrove	12.19 - 91	Yarra Junction	10.16 - 76	Warburton
1941	Yarra Junction	13.21 - 99	Warburton	9.11 - 65	Healesville
1942-44					In recess > WW2
1945	Healesville	11.18 - 84	Lilydale	6.13 - 49	Warburton
1946	Lilydale	22.20 - 152	Woori Yallock	14.13 - 97	Warburton
Yarra Valley Football League
1947	Woori Yallock	12.15 - 87	Healesville	11.17 - 83	Warburton
1948	Warburton	15.13 - 103	Healesville	7.7 - 49	Yarra Junction
1949	Warburton	14.13 - 97	Healesville	12.19 - 91	Yarra Junction
1950	Yarra Junction	7.16 - 58	Warburton	6.18 - 54	Healesville
1951	Millgrove	9.13 - 67	Healesville	10.7 - 67	Warburton. Drawn G Final.
	Healesville	11.7 - 73	Millgrove	7.14 - 56	Warburton. G Final Reply.
1952	Warburton	11.11 - 77	Marysville	5.11 - 41	Yarra Junction
1953	Warburton	12.15 - 87	Healsville	12.12 - 84	Yarra Junction
1954	Healesville	11.13 - 79	Lilydale	10.9 - 69	Warburton
1955	Yarraburn	13.11 - 89	Marysville	12.16 - 88	Warburton
1956	Millgrove	6.15 - 45	Healesville	6.5 - 35	Yarra Junction
1957	Millgrove	11.12 - 78	Marysville	10.9 - 69	Warburton
1958	Warburton	9.10 - 64	Marysville	9.5 - 59	Lilydale
1959	Marysville	10.26 - 86	Warburton	13.4 - 82	Healesville
1960	Healesville	6.10 - 46	Marysville	6.10 - 46	Drawn G Final
	Marysville	12.9 - 81	Healesville	12.8 - 80	Warburton. G Final replay
1961	Millgrove	10.8 - 68	Healesville	6.10 - 46	Warburton
1962	Healesville	11.15 - 81	Warburton	11.7 - 73	Yarra Junction
1963	Millgrove	12.16 - 88	Marysville	9.14 - 68	Healesville
1964	Healesville	15.19 - 109	Lilydale	4.11 - 35	Healesville
1965	Healesville	19.18 - 132	Woori Yallock	14.6 - 90	Warburton

== Senior football statistics ==
- Highest Score
  - 1924 - Healesville: 39.33 - 267 defeated Wandin: 4.0 - 24
- Leading Goalkicker
  - 102 - Eddie "Skip" Monger - Yarra Junction: 1933
  - 93 - Jack Clunning - Millgrove: 1927

== YVFL Reserves grand finals ==
The YVFL Reserves competition commenced in 1949.

Reserves:	YVFL Reserves Football - Grand Finals				
Year	Premiers	Scores	Runner up	Scores	Venue / Comments
1949	Healesville	9.15 - 69	Yarra Glen	9.13 - 67	Yarra Junction
1950	Healesville	12.12 - 84	Yarra Glen	7.4 - 46	Yarra Junction
1951	Powelltown	20.18 - 138	Healesville	8.12 - 60	Warburton. G Jagoe (PT): 12 goals.
1952	Powelltown	11.13 - 79	Warburton	6.9 - 45	Yarra Junction
1953	Seville	13.15 - 93	Warburton	10.11 - 71	Yarra Junction
1954	Yarra Junction	8.16 - 64	Warburton	8.8 - 54	Warburton
1955	Warburton				
1956	Marysville				
1957	Healesville				
1958	Lilydale				
1959	Healesville				
1960	Lilydale or		Valley United		
1961	Powelltown				
1962	Valley United				
1963	Healesville				
1964	Powelltown				
1965	?				

== Interleague Football Results ==
The YVFA / YVFL played in the following interleague football matches.

YVFL:	Seniors & Reserves Football Interleague Matches							
Year	Captain	Coach	Venue	YVFA Score	Match Result	YVFA Opposition	Match Score	Date/Comments
1948	Ron Henderson		Lilydale	11.16 - 82	lost to	Croydon & DFL	17.14 - 116	12.6.48
1949	Alan Williams		Warburton	15.19 - 109	defeated	Croydon & DFL	15.18 - 108	11.6.49
1950	Ron Henderson		Lilydale	13.13 - 91	defeated	Croydon FGFL	11.12 - 78	10.6.50
	C Walden		Lilydale	8.9 - 57	lost to	Croydon FGFL 2nds	10.13 - 73	10.6.50
1951	Kevin O'Donnell		Healesville	12.14 - 86	lost to	Croydon FGFL	17.10 - 112	9.6.51
			Healesville	14.14 - 98	defeated	Croydon FGFL 2nds	11.8 - 74	15.6.51
1952	Jimmy Gibbs		Lilydale	9.9 - 63	lost to	Croydon FGFL	12.6 - 78	19.7.52
			Lilydale	8.11 - 59	defeated	Croydon FGFL 2nds	6.9 -45	19.7.52
1953	Jack Mullane		Healesville	12.11 - 83	defeated	Croydon FGFL	7.7 - 49	11.7.53
	C Cook		Healesville	10.10 - 70	lost to	Croydon FGFL 2nds	11.13 - 79	11.7.53
1954	Jack McDonald		Croydon	9.6 - 60	lost to	Croydon FGFL	13.16 - 94	17.7.54
	George Nelson		Croydon	14.24 - 108	defeated	Croydon FGFL 2nds	5.3 - 33	17.7.54
1955	Jack McDonald		Lilydale	17.14 - 116	defeated	Croydon FGFL	14.19 - 103	16.7.55
1955			Lilydale	7.8 - 50	lost to	Croydon FGFL 2nds	9.16 - 70	16.7.55
1956								Match cancelled

== Premiership table ==
YVFL Senior Football
1909 and 1914 to 1965.
Most Premierships / Runners Up

Club	Most Premierships	Runners up	Draws	No Result	Grand Finals
Millgrove	11	4	1	1	17
Lilydale	8	9			17
Healesville	7	10	2	1	20
Warburton	7	8			15
Yarra Junction	6	3			9
Marysville	2	5	1		8
Yarra Glenn	2	0			2
Woori Yallock	1	2			3
Croydon	1	1			2
Little Yarra Rovers	1				1
Yarraburn	1				1
Powelltown		3			3
Montrose		1			1
Silvan		1			1
TOTAL	47	47	4	2	100

== YVFA - Senior Football Best & Fairest Award ==
Seniors:	YVFA Senior Football - Best & Fairest					
Year	Winner	Club	Votes	Second	Club	Votes
Councillor H R Horsey Trophy
1930	M L Morrison	Woori Yallock				
1931	?					
J Flahavin Trophy (Warburton Motor Service)
1932	W E "Chappie" Teese	Woori Yallock				
1933	George Sutherland	Millgrove	10	F Cameron	Woori Yallock	6
1934	George Sutherland	Millgrove	9			
1935	Ray Rouget	Wandin	15&1/2	Jackie Clunning	Millgrove	7&1/2
1936	W Brown	Wandin				
1937	C Froelich	Powelltown	5&1/2	W McClean &	Woori Yallock	5
				Ray Rouget	Wandin	5
1938	Ray Rouget	Wandin	9	Alan Story	Warburton	8&1/2
1939	Ray Rouget	Wandin	6	M Clunning	Millgrove	5&1/2&1/3
H R Horsey Trophy
1940	G Aikten	Healesville				
1941	H Mitchell	Yarra Junction	3	N Long &	Yarra Junction	2
				W Marshall	Healesville	2
1942-44						In recess>WW2
1945	Tom Inverarity	Millgrove				
1946	A McColl	Wandin	6	A Wilson	Woori Yallock	5
1947	Jack Commerford	Yarra Glen	5	Ross Bates	Healesville	4&1/2
1948	R Burrows	Yarra Junction	7	J Vennell	Westburn	6
1949	Max Stormer	Westburn	12	N Burrows	Yarra Junction	8
William Eric Valentine Trophy
1950	John Stormer	Westburn	25	R Cummings	Powelltown	20
1951	Alf Hetherton &	Yarra Junction	20	Ron Henderson	Wandin	16
	Johnnie Harrison	Mt. Evalyn	20			
1952	Johnnie Harrison	Mt. Evalyn	28	H Jacquier &	Worri Yallock	15
				J Pollard	Healesville	15
1953	Ivan "Pud" Witnish	Yarra Junction	25	Max Stormer	Millgrove	23
1954	James Wandin	Healesville	24	J McDonald	Powelltown	19
				B Stevens	Upper Yarra Dam	19
				Max Stormer	Millgrove	19
1955	Max Stormer	Seville	32	Ivan "Pud" Witnish	Yarraburn	23
1956	Ron Fletcher	Valley United				
1957	James Wandin	Healesville				
1958	James Wandin	Healesville				
1959	James Wandin	Healesville				
1960	P Halit	Millgrove				
1961	P Halit	Millgrove				
1962	Max Watson	Lilydale				
1963	Robert Trelour	Warburton				
1964	C Lawson &	Upper Ferntree Gully				
	Roger Manfield	Lilydale				
1965	G Saunders	Marysville				

- William E. Valentine was a former YVFL Secretary between 1936 and 1956.
- Max Stormer (Westburn) played with Richmond Reserves in 1950 & 1951.
- James Wandin (Healesville) played 17 games with St. Kilda in 1952 & 1953.

== YVFL - Reserves Football Best & Fairest Award ==
The YVFL Reserves competition commenced in 1949.

Reserves:	YVFA Reserves Football - Best & Fairest					
Year	Winner	Club	Votes	Second	Club	Votes
1949	James Wandin	Healesville				
1950	Jim Lindsay	Seville				
1951	Jim Lindsay	Seville	22	G Hault	Powelltown	20
1952	James Milner	Toolangi	21	Jim Lindsay &	Seville	18
				G Jageo	Powelltown	18
1953	Jim Lindsay	Seville	20	Les Brown	Westburn	16
1954	Max Read	Wandin	34	Jim Lindsay	Seville	25
Stan Truman Trophy
1955	Ray Dafter	Warburton	13	Doug Wardell	Marysville	11
1956	L Wheeler	Healesville				
1957	K Hawkey &	Lilydale				
	P Mason	Lilygale				
1958	K Phillips	Lilygale				
1959	Bill Thompson	Lilygale				
1960	M Long	Valley United				
1961	Alan Wines	Valley United				
1962	Neil Stoney	Valley United				
1963	Bill Tunn	Powelltown				
1964	Jeff Cole	Powelltown				
1965						
1966						

== Office Bearers ==
YVFA:	Office Bearers		
Year	President	Secretary	Treasurer
1909	C J Mitchell	M Clements	W Nash
1910			
1911			
1912			
1913			
1914	Robert Morton		
1915	Robert Morton		
1916-18	YVFA	in recess	due to WW1
1919			
1920			
1921	Cr Smedley	Arthur J Jones	Arthur J Jones
1922	G Potter	Arthur J Jones	Arthur J Jones
1923	Robert Morton	Arthur J Jones	Arthur J Jones
1924	Robert Morton	Arthur J Jones	Arthur J Jones
1925	E Smithers	Arthur J Jones	Arthur J Jones
1926	Robert Morton	Arthur J Jones	Arthur J Jones
1927	Robert Morton	R Hamilton	W J Chisholm
1928	Robert Morton	R Hamilton	W J Chisholm
1929	G W Crook	Arthur J Jones	E T Hunt
1930	Cr H R Horsey	H Saunders	G Maxwell
1935	L V Phillips	T Rose	W E Hutchinson
1936	L V Phillips	W E Valentine	W E Hutchinson
1937	L V Phillips	W E Valentine	W E Hutchinson
1938	L V Phillips	W E Valentine	W E Hutchinson
1939	L V Phillips	W E Valentine	W E Hutchinson
1940	H R Horsey	W E Valentine	W E Hutchinson
1941	E Dillon	W E Valentine	W E Hutchinson
1942-44	YVFA	in recess	due to WW2
1945	E Dillon	W E Valentine	W E Hutchinson
1946	E Dillon	W E Valentine	W E Hutchinson
1947	E Dillon	W E Valentine	W E Hutchinson
1948	E Dillon	W E Valentine	W E Hutchinson
1949	Tom F Brent	W E Valentine	W E Hutchinson
1950	Tom F Brent	W E Valentine	Cr. W E Hutchinson
1951	Tom F Brent	W E Valentine	W E Hutchinson
1952	Tom F Brent	W E Valentine	W E Hutchinson.
1953	Tom F Brent	W E Valentine	A Cameron
1954	Les Morrison	W E Valentine	A Cameron
1955	Les Morrison	W E Valentine	A Cameron
1956	L Morrison	W E Valentine	A Cameron

== Life members ==
- 1924 - E Cary
- 1925 - Robert Morton
- 1932 - G Crook
- 1935 - H R Horsey
- 1940 - L V Phillips
- 1953 - George Sutherland
- 1954 - Tom Brent
- 1956 - W Bill Valentine
- Duncan Campbell
- W Carpenter
- G Gordon
- Graham Maxwell
- Roly McGuire
- Dr. Phillips
- Cr. R Pollard

== Links ==
- The green and gold the history of the Marysville football club : a compilation of news reports, photographs, recollections and anecdotes. By William Metcalfe.
- 1891 - 1925: Upper Yarra Valley FA & Yarra Valley FA Premierships Lists
- 1911 - YVFA Premiership review
- 1921 - 1965: YVFL 1sts & 2nds Premiership Lists
- Yarra Valley Mountain District Football League Premiership Lists
- 1920 - YVFA Premiers: Healesville FC team photo
- 1923 - YVFA Premiers: Lilydale FC team photo
- 1932 - Millgrove FC & Warburton FC team photos
- 1935 - YVFA Premiers: Yarra Junction team photo
- 1936 - YVFA Premiers: Lilydale FC team photo
- 1938 - Warburton FC & Healesville FC team photos
- 1949 - YVFL Best & Fairest photo
- 1952 - YVFL Grand Final action photos
- 1952 - YVFL Premiers: Warburton FC team photo
- 1953 - YVFL Semi Final action photos
- 1953 - YVFL v Croydon Ferntree Gully FL team photos
- 1953 - YVFL Best & Fairest winners photo
- 1953 - YVFL Reserves Premiers: Seville FC team photo
- 1953 - Marysville FC team photo
- 1953 - Warburton FC team photo
- 1953 - Lilydale FC Semi Final team photo
- 1955 - Healesville & Marysville team photos
- 1960 - YVFL Grand Final Record, team lists
