= Craig Devonport =

Australian rules footballer

Personal information
- Full name: Craig Devonport
- Born: 27 January 1970 (age 56)
- Original team: Croydon
- Height: 183 cm (6 ft 0 in)
- Weight: 82 kg (181 lb)

Playing career^{1}
| Years | Club | Games (Goals) |
| 1989–1995 | St Kilda | 94 (80) |
| 1996 | Carlton | 1 (2) |
| Total | | 95 (82) |
- ^{1} Playing statistics correct to the end of 1996.

Craig Devonport (born 27 January 1970) is a former Australian rules footballer who played with St Kilda and Carlton in the Victorian/Australian Football League (VFL/AFL).

Devonport, who played both soccer and basketball in his youth, joined St Kilda from Croydon. He started his career as a forward and kicked two goals on his league debut in 1989, one of three appearances he would make that year.

In 1990 he didn't miss a single game, finishing as St Kilda's four highest disposal getter and kicking 28 goals. He kicked five goals against the West Coast Eagles at the WACA, all in one quarter, as well as enjoying a six-goal haul in a win over Fitzroy.

He only played in the second half of the 1991 season and had 26 disposals in his club's elimination final loss to Geelong. In 1992 he kicked a career high 29 goals and was again lively in the finals, with 20 disposals and three goals in the semi-final against Footscray.

Over the subsequent seasons, Devonport was often used by St Kilda as a defender. He was traded to Carlton in the 1995 AFL draft, in return for the 19th draft pick which St Kilda would be used to get Barry Hall. Despite kicking two goals in his only AFL game that season, against Melbourne, he was delisted at the end of the year.
