= Jack Parker (footballer, born 1911) =

Australian rules footballer, born 1911

Personal information
- Full name: John Joseph Parker
- Born: 28 March 1911; Ballarat, Victoria
- Died: 10 December 2003 (aged 92)
- Original team: Yea

Playing career^{1}
| Years | Club | Games (Goals) |
| 1935 | North Melbourne | 1 (0) |
- ^{1} Playing statistics correct to the end of 1935.

Jack Parker (28 March 1911 – 10 December 2003) was an Australian rules footballer who played with North Melbourne in the Victorian Football League (VFL).

Parker, was recruited from Yea in the Waranga North East Football Association in 1935.

Parker later served in the Australian Army during World War II.
