= Bill Purcell (footballer) =

Australian rules footballer, born 1905

Personal information
- Full name: Bill Purcell
- Born: 16 March 1905
- Died: 11 July 1986 (aged 81)
- Original team: Yea
- Position: Full Forward

Playing career^{1}
Years	Club	Games (Goals)
1931	North Melbourne	10 (6)
- ^{1} Playing statistics correct to the end of 1931.

Bill Purcell (16 March 1905 – 11 July 1986) was an Australian rules footballer who played with North Melbourne in the Victorian Football League (VFL).

Purcell was recruited from Yea in the Waranga & North East Football Association.
