= Andrew McKinnon =

Australian rules footballer

Personal information
- Full name: Andrew McKinnon
- Born: 28 July 1968 (age 58)
- Original team: Olinda
- Height: 175 cm (5 ft 9 in)
- Weight: 75 kg (165 lb)
- Position: Rover / forward

Playing career^{1}
Years	Club	Games (Goals)
1989–1990	Carlton	15 (7)
- ^{1} Playing statistics correct to the end of 1990.

Career highlights
- Reserves premiership player, 1990

Andrew McKinnon (born 28 July 1968) is a former Australian rules footballer who played for the Carlton Football Club in the Australian Football League (AFL).
