= David Murray (Australian footballer) =

Australian rules footballer

Personal information
- Full name: David Murray
- Born: 12 November 1955 (age 70)
- Original team: Yea
- Height: 182 cm (6 ft 0 in)
- Weight: 84 kg (185 lb)

Playing career^{1}
Years	Club	Games (Goals)
1974	Melbourne	6 (0)
- ^{1} Playing statistics correct to the end of 1974.

David Murray (born 12 November 1955) is a former Australian rules footballer who played with Melbourne in the Victorian Football League (VFL).
