= Alan Olle =

Australian rules footballer

Personal information
- Full name: Alan Charles Olle
- Born: 23 July 1924; Melbourne, Victoria
- Died: 12 October 2004 (aged 80)
- Original team: St Kilda CYMS (CYMSFA)
- Height: 174 cm (5 ft 9 in)
- Weight: 76 kg (168 lb)

Playing career^{1}
Years	Club	Games (Goals)
1946–1951	St Kilda	51 (1)
1952–1961	Sorrento	162 (unknown)

Coaching career
Years	Club	Games (W–L–D)
1982	Sorrento	16-18 (non-playing coach)
- ^{1} Playing statistics correct to the end of 1961.

Career highlights
- 1953 Sorrento premiership captain-coach; 1955 Sorrento B&F and LGK (44)

Alan Charles Olle (23 July 1924 – 12 October 2004) was an Australian rules footballer who played for St Kilda in the Victorian Football League (VFL).

== Early life ==
Olle was born in Melbourne in 1924.

In 1942 he enlisted in the Royal Australian Air Force (RAAF), serving as a sergeant until he was discharged in 1946.

== Football career ==
He made his debut in the final round of the 1946 VFL season against Sydney at the Junction Oval. Between 1946 and 1951 he played 51 matches for the Saints.

In 1952 Olle accepted a coaching role in Sorrento when the Coulter Law restricted payments to VFL players to £3 per week, £7 less than Sorrento's offer. His employer, the Postmaster-General's Department (PMG) obliged with a transfer to Sorrento's telephone exchange. Only a year passed before Sorrento was celebrating its first premiership in 18 years, defeating Frankston by 3 points 12-6-78 to 11-9-75 in a thriller. Olle and president Jim Thoms (ex-Footscray) were instrumental in attracting numerous talented VFL/VFA players to the club to mount the 1953 premiership assault including Mike Fitchett (Hawthorn), Dick Kennedy (Melbourne and Fitzroy), Alby Morrison (Footscray), Fred Stafford (1947 Carlton premiers), Ron Wilson (St.Kilda) and Norm Spencer (Brunswick).

Olle had a record-breaking 3-stint association with Sorrento over nine seasons, the first and second as playing coach (1952-1956 and 1959–1961) the third and final as non-playing coach (1982).
