= Outer East Football Netball League =

Australian rules football and netball league in Victoria

- Formerly: Yarra Valley FL; South East FNL
- Sport: Australian rules football Netball
- Founded: 2018; 8 years ago
- CEO: Aaron Bailey
- President: Tony Mitchell
- Website: outereastfn.com.au

The Outer East Football Netball League is an Australian rules football and netball league stretching from the Goulburn Valley, Dandenong Ranges, and western Gippsland within Victoria.

== History ==
The league was formed with the merger of the Yarra Valley Mountain District Football League and the South East Football Netball League in 2018.

In 2020 the league admitted Broadford from the Riddell District Football League and junior club Berwick Springs. The Titans competed in the underage competition in 2019. The 2020 season was cancelled due to government restrictions of contact sport because of the Covid pandemic.

Following a restructure of the competition, Division Two was discontinued after the 2023 season.

Narre Warren and Berwick Springs left to join the Southern FNL following the 2024 season.

== Clubs ==
=== Locations ===
Locations of the 2025 OEFNL clubs. Red indicates clubs in Premier Division, yellow clubs in Division One and black clubs only fielding juniors. Alexandra, Thornton-Eildon and Yea play roughly 50 km north of Healesville.

=== Premier Division ===
Club	Colours	Nickname	Home Ground	Former League	Est.	Years in OEFNL	Senior Premierships	
Club	Colours	Nickname	Home Ground	Former League	Est.	Years in OEFNL	Total	Most recent
Gembrook Cockatoo		Brookers	Gembrook Recreation Reserve, Gembrook	YRFNL	1906	2019-	6	2022
Healesville		Bloods	Don Road Sporting Complex, Healesville	YRFNL	1888	2019-	18	2024
Monbulk		Hawks	Monbulk Recreation Reserve, Monbulk	YRFNL	1895	2019-	15	2006
Mount Evelyn		Rovers	Mount Evelyn Recreation Reserve, Mount Evelyn	YRFNL	1931	2019-	5	1998
Officer		Kangaroos	Officer Recreation Reserve, Officer	SEFNL	1977	2019-	5	2002
Olinda-Ferny Creek		Bloods	Olinda Recreation Reserve, Olinda	YRFNL	1908	2019-	10	2017
Upwey-Tecoma		Tigers	Upwey Recreation Reserve, Upwey	YRFNL	1946	2019-	15	2011
Wandin		Bulldogs	Wandin North Recreation Reserve, Wandin North	YRFNL	1909	2019-	9	2026
Warburton-Millgrove		Burras	Mac Sparke Oval, Warburton	YRFNL	1967	2019-	4	2025
Woori Yallock		Tigers	Woori Yallock Recreation Reserve, Woori Yallock	YRFNL	1904	2019-	13	2014

=== Division One ===
Club	Colours	Nickname	Home Ground	Former League	Est.	Years in OEFNL	Senior Premierships	
Club	Colours	Nickname	Home Ground	Former League	Est.	Years in OEFNL	Total	Most recent
Alexandra		Rebels	Alexandra Showgrounds, Alexandra	YRFNL	1872	2019-	16	2008
Belgrave		Magpies	Belgrave Recreation Reserve, Belgrave	YRFNL	1909	2019-	12	2017
Emerald		Bombers	Chandler Recreation Reserve, Emerald	YRFNL	1904	2019-	10	2023
Pakenham		Lions	Toomuc Reserve, Pakenham	SEFNL	1892	2019-	31	2026
Powelltown		Demons	Powelltown Recreation Reserve, Powelltown	YRFNL	1922	2019-	3	2023
Seville		Blues	Seville Recreation Reserve, Seville	YRFNL	1972	2019-	6	2019
Yarra Glen		River Pigs	Yarra Glen Recreation Reserve, Yarra Glen	YRFNL	1888	2019-	12	2014
Yarra Junction		Eagles	Yarra Junction Memorial Reserve, Yarra Junction	YRFNL	1909	2019-	12	2018
Yea		Tigers	Yea Showgrounds, Yea	YRFNL	1893	2019-2021, 2024-	15	2005

=== Women's Division One ===
Club	Colours	Nickname	Home Ground	Former League	Est.	Years in OEFNL	Premierships	
Club	Colours	Nickname	Home Ground	Former League	Est.	Years in OEFNL	Total	Most recent
Belgrave		Magpies	Belgrave Recreation Reserve, Belgrave	–	1907	2019-	1	2023
Healesville		Bloods	Don Road Sporting Complex, Healesville	–	1888	2019-	0	–
Mount Evelyn		Rovers	Mount Evelyn Recreation Reserve, Mount Evelyn	EFNL	1931	2025-	2	2026
Olinda-Ferny Creek		Bloods	Olinda Recreation Reserve, Olinda	–	1908	2019-	2	2023
Pakenham		Lions	Toomuc Reserve, Pakenham	–	1892	2019-	1	2024
Upwey-Tecoma		Tigers	Upwey Recreation Reserve, Upwey	–	1946	2019-	1	2021
Warburton-Wesburn		Burras	Mac Sparke Oval, Warburton	–	1967	2019-	1	2025

=== Women's Division Two ===
Club	Colours	Nickname	Home Ground	Former League	Est.	Years in OEFNL	Premierships	
Club	Colours	Nickname	Home Ground	Former League	Est.	Years in OEFNL	Total	Most recent
Emerald		Bombers	Chandler Recreation Reserve, Emerald	–	1904	2019-	0	–
Gembrook Cockatoo		Brookers	Gembrook Recreation Reserve, Gembrook	–	1906	2026-	0	–
Officer		Kangaroos	Officer Recreation Reserve, Officer	–	1977	2019-	0	–
Seville		Blues	Seville Recreation Reserve, Seville	–	1972	2019-	0	–
Thornton-Eildon		Shinboners	Thornton Recreation Reserve, Thornton	–	1949	2019-	0	–
Wandin		Bulldogs	Wandin North Recreation Reserve, Wandin North	–	1909	2019-	0	–
Woori Yallock		Tigers	Woori Yallock Recreation Reserve, Woori Yallock	–	1904	2019-	0	–
Yea		Tigers	Yea Showgrounds, Yea	–	1893	2025-	1	2026

=== Women's teams in recess ===
Club	Colours	Nickname	Home Ground	Former League	Est.	Years in OEFNL	Flags	Premiership years
Monbulk		Hawks	Monbulk Recreation Reserve, Monbulk	–	1895	2019-	2	2024

=== Clubs with juniors only ===
Club	Colours	Nickname	Home Ground	Est.	Years in OEFNL
Wesburn		Bulldogs	Wesburn Park, Wesburn	1958	2019-

== Former clubs ==
Club	Colours	Nickname	Home Ground	Former League	Est.	Years in OEFNL	Senior Premierships		Fate
Club	Colours	Nickname	Home Ground	Former League	Est.	Years in OEFNL	Total	Most recent	Fate
Beaconsfield		Eagles	Holm Park, Beaconsfield	SEFNL	1890	2019-2021	10	2014	Joined Eastern FNL in 2022
Berwick		Wickers	Edwin Flack Oval, Berwick	SEFNL	1903	2019	9	2018	Joined Eastern FNL in 2020
Berwick Springs		Titans	Mick Morland Reserve, Clyde North	–	2020	2020-2024	0	-	Joined Southern FNL in 2025
Broadford		Kangaroos	Harley Hammond Reserve, Broadford	RDFNL	1890	2020-2023	17	1996	In recess since 2023. Moved to Bendigo FNL in 2025
Cranbourne		Eagles	Livingston Recreation Reserve, Cranbourne East	SEFNL	1889	2019-2021	13	2022	Joined Southern FNL in 2022
Doveton		Doves	Robinson Reserve, Doveton	SEFNL	1959	2019-2021	8	2019	Joined Southern FNL in 2022
Hallam		Hawks	Hallam Recreation Reserve, Hallam	SFNL	2012	2023	0	-	Returned to Southern FNL in 2024
Kinglake		Lakers	Kinglake Memorial Oval, Kinglake	NFNL	1930	2019-2022	3	1994	Returned to Northern FNL in 2023
Narre Warren		Magpies	Kalora Park, Narre Warren North	SEFNL	1953	2019-2024	12	2024	Joined Southern FNL in 2025

== Premiers ==
=== Football ===
==== Premier Division ====
Year	Seniors	Reserves
2019	Narre Warren	Narre Warren
2022	Narre Warren	Narre Warren
2023	Wandin	Narre Warren
2024	Narre Warren	Narre Warren
2025	Wandin	Upwey-Tecoma
2026	Wandin	Mt Evelyn

==== Division One ====
Year	Seniors	Reserves
2019	Doveton	Pakenham
2022	Gembrook Cockatoo	Gembrook Cockatoo
2023	Emerald	Officer
2024	Healesville	Belgrave
2025	Warburton-Millgrove	Alexandra
2026	Pakenham	Pakenham

==== Division Two ====
Year	Seniors	Reserves
2019	Seville	Yarra Junction
2022	Powelltown	Warburton-Millgrove
2023	Powelltown	Warburton-Millgrove

=== Netball ===
==== Premier Division ====
Year	A Grade	B Grade	C Grade	D Grade
2019	Olinda-Ferny Creek	Beaconsfield	Cranbourne	Berwick
2022	Olinda-Ferny Creek	Narre Warren	Narre Warren	Narre Warren
2023	Narre Warren	Narre Warren	Narre Warren	Narre Warren
2024	Narre Warren	Officer	Narre Warren	Officer
2025	Wandin	Monbulk	Wandin	Monbulk

==== Division One ====
Year	A Grade	B Grade	C Grade	D Grade
2019	Mount Evelyn	Pakenham	Doveton	Officer
2022	Seville	Seville	Seville	Berwick
2023	Emerald	Seville	Seville	Seville
2024	Warburton-Millgrove	Seville	Seville	Seville
2025	Seville	Seville	Pakenham	Seville
2026	Seville	Seville	Seville	Seville

==== Division Two ====
Year	A Grade	B Grade	C Grade	D Grade
2019	Yea	Seville	Seville	Yea
2022	Warburton-Millgrove	Powelltown	Warburton-Millgrove	Warburton-Millgrove
2023	Warburton-Millgrove	Broadford	Yarra Glen	Warburton-Millgrove

== Seasons ==
=== 2019 ===
==== Premier Division ====
Ladder	W	L	D	For	Agst	%	Pts	Final	Team	G	B	Pts	Team	G	B	Pts
Berwick	14	2	0	1763	787	224.02	56	Elimination	Cranbourne	6	11	47	Woori Yallock	3	14	32
Narre Warren	13	3	0	1942	1001	194.01	52	Qualifying	Narre Warren	13	5	83	Beaconsfield	2	9	21
Beaconsfield	11	5	0	1570	839	187.13	44	1st Semi	Beaconsfield	10	18	78	Cranbourne	9	9	63
Woori Yallock	9	6	1	1240	1221	101.56	38	2nd Semi	Berwick	14	9	93	Narre Warren	7	16	58
Cranbourne	8	7	1	1410	1042	135.32	34	Preliminary	Narre Warren	16	5	101	Beaconsfield	11	11	77
Wandin	7	9	0	1398	1775	78.76	28	Grand Final	Narre Warren	5	6	36	Berwick	4	3	27
Olinda-Ferny Creek	5	11	0	1047	1363	76.82	20									
Upwey-Tecoma	3	13	0	920	1848	49.78	12									
Healesville	1	15	0	771	2185	35.29	4									

==== Division One ====
Ladder	W	L	D	For	Agst	%	Pts	Final	Team	G	B	Pts	Team	G	B	Pts
Pakenham	14	2	0	1360	742	183.29	56	Elimination	Officer	15	14	104	Mount Evelyn	6	7	43
Monbulk	14	2	0	1390	810	171.60	56	Qualifying	Doveton	8	12	60	Monbulk	7	3	45
Doveton	10	6	0	1239	1032	120.06	40	1st Semi	Monbulk	14	22	106	Officer	4	10	34
Mount Evelyn	9	7	0	1282	1106	115.91	36	2nd Semi	Doveton	8	2	50	Pakenham	2	4	16
Officer	8	8	0	1480	1035	143.00	32	Preliminary	Pakenham	11	8	74	Monbulk	7	7	49
Emerald	5	11	0	1093	1406	77.74	20	Grand Final	Doveton	9	7	61	Pakenham	8	7	55
Belgrave	2	14	0	982	1773	55.39	8									
Warburton-Millgrove	2	14	0	661	1583	41.76	8									

==== Division Two ====
Ladder	W	L	D	For	Agst	%	Pts	Final	Team	G	B	Pts	Team	G	B	Pts
Seville	14	2	0	2024	847	238.96	56	Elimination	Powelltown	16	7	103	Gembrook Cockatoo	11	11	77
Yarra Junction	13	3	0	1826	964	189.42	52	Qualifying	Yarra Junction	14	13	97	Kinglake	13	7	85
Kinglake	12	4	0	1556	1224	127.12	48	1st Semi	Powelltown	12	18	90	Kinglake	9	10	64
Gembrook Cockatoo	9	7	0	1491	1103	135.18	36	2nd Semi	Seville	13	15	93	Yarra Junction	11	11	77
Powelltown	9	7	0	1488	1111	133.93	36	Preliminary	Yarra Junction	10	9	69	Powelltown	10	6	66
Yarra Glen	8	8	0	1572	1313	119.73	32	Grand Final	Seville	23	14	152	Yarra Junction	13	12	90
Alexandra	5	11	0	1121	1599	70.11	20									
Yea	1	15	0	734	2142	34.27	4									
Thornton-Eildon	1	15	0	639	2148	29.75	4									

=== 2022 ===
==== Premier Division ====
Ladder	W	L	D	For	Agst	%	Pts	Final	Team	G	B	Pts	Team	G	B	Pts
Narre Warren	15	1	0	2397	760	315.39	60	Elimination	Olinda-Ferny Creek	8	11	59	Monbulk	8	10	58
Woori Yallock	13	3	0	1676	1139	147.15	52	Qualifying	Wandin	16	10	106	Woori Yallock	12	12	84
Wandin	12	4	0	1578	1273	123.96	48	First Semi	Woori Yallock	19	9	123	Olinda-Ferny Creek	10	15	75
Olinda-Ferny Creek	9	7	0	1506	1356	111.06	36	Second Semi	Narre Warren	15	14	104	Wandin	10	9	69
Monbulk	8	8	0	1237	1142	108.32	32	Preliminary	Woori Yallock	8	9	57	Wandin	7	8	50
Pakenham	8	8	0	1304	1218	107.06	32	Grand Final	Narre Warren	9	18	72	Woori Yallock	8	10	58
Upwey-Tecoma	4	12	0	1054	1546	68.18	16									
Mount Evelyn	2	14	0	941	2083	45.18	8									
Officer	1	15	0	778	1954	39.82	4									

=== 2023 ===
==== Premier Division ====
Ladder	W	L	D	For	Agst	%	Pts	Final	Team	G	B	Pts	Team	G	B	Pts
Narre Warren	15	1	0	1998	878	227.56	60	Elimination	Pakenham	14	13	97	Upwey-Tecoma	11	13	79
Wandin	14	2	0	1756	938	187.21	56	Qualifying	Wandin	12	16	88	Woori Yallock	8	6	54
Woori Yallock	10	6	0	1275	1227	103.91	40	First Semi	Woori Yallock	14	14	98	Pakenham	12	13	85
Pakenham	7	9	0	1044	1217	85.78	28	Second Semi	Narre Warren	9	10	64	Wandin	9	7	61
Upwey-Tecoma	6	9	1	1173	1306	89.82	26	Preliminary	Wandin	23	21	159	Woori Yallock	9	12	66
Mount Evelyn	6	10	0	1183	1457	81.19	24	Grand Final	Wandin	21	15	141	Narre Warren	11	12	78
Monbulk	5	10	1	1130	1395	81.00	20									
Olinda-Ferny Creek	5	11	0	1316	1639	80.29	20									
Gembrook Cockatoo	3	13	0	925	1743	53.07	12									

==== Division One ====
Ladder	W	L	D	For	Agst	%	Pts	Final	Team	G	B	Pts	Team	G	B	Pts
Emerald	14	2	0	1817	975	186.36		1st Semi	Healesville	11	7	73	Seville	10	11	71
Berwick Springs	12	4	0	1343	1033	130.01		2nd Semi	Berwick Springs	19	11	125	Emerald	14	22	106
Healesville	9	6	0	1184	912	129.82		Preliminary	Emerald	15	15	105	Healesville	12	8	80
Seville	9	7	0	1368	1158	118.13		Grand Final	Emerald	14	16	100	Berwick Springs	5	11	41
Officer	7	8	0	1164	1112	104.68										
Belgrave	2	13	0	855	1583	54.01										
Hallam	1	14	0	726	1684	43.11										

==== Division Two ====
Ladder	W	L	D	For	Agst	%	Pts	Final	Team	G	B	Pts	Team	G	B	Pts
Warburton-Millgrove	12	3	0	1598	762	209.71	48	1st Semi	Powelltown	22	16	148	Yarra Glen	3	12	30
Alexandra	12	3	0	1630	803	202.99	48	2nd Semi	Alexandra	9	16	70	Warburton-Millgrove	5	9	39
Powelltown	12	3	0	1605	949	169.13	48	Preliminary	Powelltown	17	20	122	Warburton-Millgrove	10	13	73
Yarra Glen	6	9	0	1034	1386	74.60	24	Grand Final	Powelltown	17	12	114	Alexandra	15	11	101
Broadford	2	13	0	778	1743	44.64	8									
Yarra Junction	1	14	0	927	1929	48.06	4									

=== 2024 ===
==== Division One ====
Ladder	W	L	D	For	Agst	%	Pts	Final	Team	G	B	Pts	Team	G	B	Pts
Seville	13	2	1	1940	727	266.85	54	Qualifying	Healesville	11	9	75	Warburton-Millgrove	9	16	70
Healesville	13	3	0	1738	681	255.21	52	Elimination	Belgrave	11	12	78	Alexandra	10	13	73
Warburton-Millgrove	13	3	0	1562	801	195.01	52	1st Semi	Warburton-Millgrove	18	11	119	Belgrave	5	11	41
Belgrave	9	6	1	1663	1088	152.85	38	2nd Semi	Healesville	16	18	114	Seville	10	7	67
Alexandra	9	7	0	1566	879	178.16	32	Preliminary	Warburton-Millgrove	7	8	50	Seville	4	12	36
Yea	8	8	0	1352	1271	106.37	32	Grand Final	Healesville	9	9	63	Warburton-Millgrove	1	5	11
Yarra Glen	2	14	0	794	2035	39.02	8									
Yarra Junction	2	14	0	675	2014	33.52	8									
Powelltown	2	14	0	619	2413	25.65	8									

=== 2025 ===
==== Premier ====
Ladder	W	L	D	For	Agst	%	Pts	Final	Team	G	B	Pts	Team	G	B	Pts
Wandin	17	1	0	2155	1033	204.74	68	Qualifying	Olinda-Ferny Creek	14	7	91	Woori Yallock	12	15	87
Woori Yallock	13	5	0	1658	1190	139.33	52	Elimination	Monbulk	13	19	97	Healesville	10	4	64
Olinda-Ferny Creek	12	6	0	1681	1153	145.79	48	1st Semi	Woori Yallock	9	13	67	Monbulk	5	11	41
Monbulk	11	7	0	1265	1073	117.89	44	2nd Semi	Wandin	13	8	86	Olinda-Ferny Creek	9	11	65
Healesville	9	8	1	1176	1286	91.45	38	Preliminary	Olinda-Ferny Creek	16	14	110	Woori Yallock	10	11	71
Mount Evelyn	8	9	1	1316	1271	103.54	34	Grand Final	Wandin	22	13	145	Olinda-Ferny Creek	8	6	54
Upwey-Tecoma	7	10	1	1321	1548	85.34	30									
Officer	5	12	1	1082	1585	68.26	22									
Gembrook-Cockatoo	4	14	0	1077	1713	62.87	16									
Emerald	2	16	0	902	1741	51.81	8									

==== Division One ====
Ladder	W	L	D	For	Agst	%	Pts	Final	Team	G	B	Pts	Team	G	B	Pts
Warburton-Millgrove	13	3	0	1860	789	235.74	52	Qualifying	Seville	15	10	100	Pakenham	11	10	76
Pakenham	13	3	0	1697	753	225.37	52	Elimination	Alexandra	11	9	75	Belgrave	10	11	71
Seville	13	3	0	1699	841	202.02	52	1st Semi	Pakenham	15	9	99	Alexandra	12	8	80
Belgrave	10	6	0	1564	1310	119.39	40	2nd Semi	Seville	19	12	126	Warburton-Millgrove	9	8	62
Alexandra	9	7	0	1346	1128	119.33	44	Preliminary	Warburton-Millgrove	19	11	125	Pakenham	12	8	80
Yarra Glen	7	8	1	1227	1479	82.96	32	Grand Final	Warburton-Millgrove	6	16	52	Seville	6	12	48
Yea	3	12	1	1073	1310	81.91	14									
Powelltown	3	13	0	872	1996	43.69	12									
Yarra Junction	0	16	0	580	2312	25.09	0									

=== 2026 ===
==== Division One ====
Ladder	W	L	D	For	Agst	%	Pts	Final	Team	G	B	Pts	Team	G	B	Pts
Pakenham	16	0	0	2030	675	300.74	64	Qualifying	Seville	13	13	91	Alexandra	9	8	62
Seville	14	2	0	2014	653	308.42	52	Elimination	Emerald	14	11	95	Yarra Glen	11	12	78
Alexandra	11	5	0	2112	1000	211.20	44	1st Semi	Alexandra	14	16	100	Emerald	7	6	48
Yarra Glen	9	6	1	1925	1075	179.07	38	2nd Semi	Pakenham	15	7	97	Seville	11	8	74
Emerald	7	8	1	1684	1173	143.56	30	Preliminary	Seville	16	11	107	Alexandra	12	4	76
Belgrave	7	9	0	1536	1157	132.76	28	Grand Final	Pakenham	11	13	79	Seville	7	7	49
Yea	5	11	0	1089	1381	78.86	20									
Powelltown	2	14	0	374	3194	11.71	8									
Yarra Junction	0	16	0	326	2782	11.72	0									

== Records ==
=== Highest Scores ===
Score	Team	Opponent	Division	Year	Round	Ground
45.19 (289)	Alexandra	Powelltown	Div 1	2026	Rd 15	Alexandra Showgrounds
44.19 (283)	Healesville	Powelltown	Div 1	2024	Rd 2	Powelltown Reserve
40.16 (256)	Pakenham	Powelltown	Div 1	2026	Rd 17	Powelltown Reserve
39.20 (254)	Alexandra	Powelltown	Div 1	2026	Rd 6	Powelltown Reserve
38.25 (253)	Yarra Glen	Powelltown	Div 1	2026	Rd 4	Yarra Glen Reserve
37.31 (253)	Yarra Glen	Yarra Junction	Div 1	2026	Rd 13	Yarra Glen Reserve
40.9 (249)	Yarra Junction	Yea	Div 2	2022	Rd 2	Yea Showgrounds
38.20 (248)	Seville	Powelltown	Div 1	2026	Rd 18	Seville Reserve
36.30 (246)	Warburton-Millgrove	Yarra Junction	Div 1	2025	Rd 3	Warburton Reserve
38.11 (239)	Narre Warren	Officer	Premier	2022	Rd 9	Officer Reserve

=== Lowest Scores ===
Score	Team	Opponent	Division	Year	Round	Ground
0.0 (0)	Yarra Glen	Healvesville	Div 1	2024	Rd 15	Don Road Sporting Complex
0.0 (0)	Yarra Junction	Seville	Div 1	2024	Rd 15	Seville Reserve
0.0 (0)	Yarra Junction	Seville	Div 1	2026	Rd 12	Yarra Junction Reserve
0.1 (1)	Yarra Junction	Pakenham	Div 1	2025	Rd 6	Toomuc Reserve
0.2 (2)	Yarra Junction	Pakenham	Div 1	2026	Rd 16	Toomuc Reserve
0.3 (3)	Powelltown	Healesville	Div 1	2024	Rd 2	Powelltown Reserve
0.3 (3)	Yarra Junction	Healesville	Div 1	2024	Rd 9	Healesville Reserve
0.3 (3)	Yarra Junction	Seville	Div 1	2026	Rd 3	Seville Reserve
0.5 (5)	Warburton-Millgrove	Officer	Div 1	2019	Rd 11	Officer Reserve
0.5 (5)	Gembrook Cockatoo	Wandin	Premier	2023	Rd 9	Wandin North Reserve

=== Largest Winning Margins ===
Margin	Team	Opponent	Division	Year	Round	Ground
281 pts	Alexandra	Powelltown	Div 1	2026	Rd 15	Alexandra Showgrounds
280 pts	Healesville	Powelltown	Div 1	2024	Rd 2	Powelltown Reserve
241 pts	Pakenham	Powelltown	Div 1	2026	Rd 17	Powelltown Reserve
241 pts	Seville	Powelltown	Div 1	2026	Rd 18	Seville Reserve
238 pts	Warburton-Millgrove	Yarra Junction	Div 1	2025	Rd 3	Warburton Reserve
238 pts	Yarra Glen	Yarra Junction	Div 1	2026	Rd 13	Yarra Glen Reserve
230 pts	Yarra Glen	Powelltown	Div 1	2026	Rd 4	Yarra Glen Reserve
228 pts	Narre Warren	Officer	Premier	2022	Rd 9	Officer Reserve
228 pts	Alexandra	Powelltown	Div 1	2026	Rd 6	Powelltown Reserve
226 pts	Seville	Thornton-Eildon	Div 2	2019	Rd 13	Thornton Reserve
226 pts	Pakenham	Yarra Junction	Div 1	2026	Rd 16	Toomuc Reserve

=== Highest Losing Scores ===
Score	Team	Opponent	Score	Division	Year	Round	Ground
19.17 (131)	Berwick	Wandin	22.9 (141)	Premier	2019	Rd 1	Wandin North Reserve
18.20 (128)	Healesville	Wandin	25.12 (162)	Premier	2019	Rd 8	Wandin North Reserve
19.11 (125)	Warburton-Millgrove	Powelltown	20.11 (131)	Div 2	2022	Rd 2	Powelltown Reserve
20.4 (124)	Kinglake	Powelltown	26.22 (178)	Div 2	2022	Rd 9	Powelltown Reserve
19.8 (122)	Wandin	Narre Warren	18.21 (129)	Premier	2019	Rd 14	Wandin North Reserve
18.10 (118)	Wandin	Woori Yallock	19.20 (134)	Premier	2022	Rd 2	Wandin North Reserve
16.14 (110)	Yea	Powelltown	18.13 (121)	Div 1	2025	Rd 18	Powelltown Reserve
17.7 (109)	Monbulk	Wandin	21.12 (138)	Premier	2023	Rd 13	Wandin North Reserve
14.22 (106)	Emerald	Berwick Springs	19.11 (125)	Div 1	2023	SF	Woori Yallock Reserve
16.8 (104)	Seville	Warburton-Millgrove	17.9 (111)	Div 1	2025	Rd 13	Warburton Reserve

=== Lowest Winning Scores ===
Score	Team	Opponent	Score	Division	Year	Round	Ground
5.6 (36)	Narre Warren	Berwick	4.3 (27)	Premier	2019	GF	Toomuc Reserve
6.2 (38)	Healesville	Gembrook Cockatoo	3.11 (29)	Premier	2026	Rd 10	Don Road Sporting Complex
4.14 (38)	Mount Evelyn	Woori Yallock	4.6 (30)	Premier	2026	Rd 11	Woori Yallock Reserve
4.15 (39)	Upwey-Tecoma	Olinda-Ferny Creek	4.11 (35)	Premier	2021	Rd 10	Upwey Reserve
5.10 (40)	Warburton-Millgrove	Yea	3.7 (25)	Div 1	2024	Rd 15	Yea Showgrounds
5.10 (40)	Monbulk	Mount Evelyn	5.7 (37)	Premier	2025	Rd 17	Monbulk Reserve
6.6 (42)	Berwick Springs	Olinda-Ferny Creek	4.15 (39)	Premier	2024	Rd 7	Mick Morland Reserve
6.7 (43)	Doveton	Warburton-Millgrove	3.7 (25)	Div 1	2019	Rd 16	Warburton Reserve
5.13 (43)	Mount Evelyn	Berwick Springs	5.6 (36)	Premier	2024	Rd 5	Mick Morland Reserve
5.13 (43)	Woori Yallock	Olinda-Ferny Creek	5.7 (37)	Premier	2024	Rd 11	Woori Yallock Reserve
