= Geoff McGivern (footballer) =

Australian rules footballer

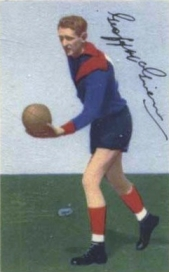

Personal information
- Full name: William Geoffrey McGivern
- Born: 27 December 1930; Geelong, Victoria
- Died: 15 August 2015 (aged 84)
- Original team: Croydon
- Height: 191 cm (6 ft 3 in)
- Weight: 86 kg (190 lb)
- Positions: Centre half-forward, centre half-back

Playing career^{1}
Years	Club	Games (Goals)
1950–1956	Melbourne	105 (53)
- ^{1} Playing statistics correct to the end of 1956.

Career highlights
- Melbourne premiership player 1955; Keith 'Bluey' Truscott Medal 1952; Croydon Ferntree Gully FL Reserves Premiership 1947; 102 goals: Croydon FC Reserves 1947; Croydon Ferntree Gully FL best & fairest 1958

William Geoffrey McGivern (27 December 1930 – 15 August 2015) was an Australian rules footballer who played in the Victorian Football League (VFL) after kicking 105 goals and playing in Croydon's Reserves 1947 Croydon Ferntree Gully Football League premiership side as a 16 year old. McGivern trained with Richmond in late 1947, then missed all of the 1949 football season due to appendicitis.

In 1950, McGivern began his seven-year career with Melbourne, originally as a half-forward. McGivern won the club's best and fairest award in 1952, and played as a defender when the Demons overcame Collingwood by 28 points in the close 1955 Grand Final. But McGivern missed the 1956 Grand Final after he was injured in the second semi final.

He played a total of 105 VFL games and kicked 53 goals, retiring from VFL football at the end of the 1956 season due to his family business commitments at McGivern Bros Quarry.

McGivern returned to play with Croydon in 1957 and won the Croydon Ferntree Gully Football League best and fairest award in 1958.

McGivern died on 15 August 2015 at the age of 84.
