= Frank Costigan (footballer) =

Australian rules footballer, born 1902

Personal information
- Full name: Francis Eugene Costigan
- Born: 16 December 1902; Fitzroy North, Victoria
- Died: 31 July 1977 (aged 74); Caulfield South, Victoria
- Original team: Newman College
- Height: 170 cm (5 ft 7 in)

Playing career^{1}
Years	Club	Games (Goals)
1925–27	Fitzroy	26 (9)
- ^{1} Playing statistics correct to the end of 1927.

Francis Eugene Costigan (16 December 1902 – 31 July 1977) was an Australian rules footballer who played with Fitzroy in the Victorian Football League (VFL).
