= Lilydale Football Club =

Lilydale Football / Netball Club

Names
- Full name: Lilydale Football Club
- Nickname: Falcons

Club details
- Founded: 1872; 154 years ago
- Colours: Blue Yellow
- Competition: EFNL since 1965
- Premierships: (25) 1892, 1893, 1895, 1896, 1897, 1900, 1903, 1906, 1910, 1913, 1915, 1919, 1922, 1923, 1924, 1936, 1938, 1940, 1946, 1988, 1991, 1996, 1998, 2003, 2011
- Ground: Lilydale Recreation Reserve

Other information
- Official website: lilydalefnc.com.au

The Lilydale Football Club is an Australian rules football club located in the outer eastern Melbourne suburb of Lilydale. Known as the "Falcons", the club fields both senior and junior teams in the Eastern Football League.

== History ==
The Lilydale Football Club is one of the oldest Australian Rules clubs, having been formed in 1872 and incorporated in 1984.

The club has played in official football competitions since 1891 and have won many senior football premiership during that time.

The club's early years were most distinguished, winning an incredible 18 senior football premierships prior to World War Two.

Most of the club's early success was in the powerful Yarra Valley Football League, winning nine premierships between 1909 and 1965, before the YVFL merged with the Mountain District Football League in 1966 to then form the Yarra Valley Mountain District Football League.

In 2006, The Falcons made it to the Eastern Football League - Division One finals for the time in its history. They also backed that up the following year. However, in both years they were knocked out in the first game against East Ringwood and EFL newcomers, Balwyn.

Former Coach Brett Fisher was rewarded both years by being named SEN division one coach of the year.

After the 2009 and 2010 seasons the club lost many of its star players and in 2010 was relegated to the second division.

They won the flag in second division and managed to stay in first division until relegated after finishing last in season 2014.

The club magazine is the Flanker.

The Coterie Group are known as the Falconians.

== Football Premierships ==
Seniors

- The Jordan Trophy
  - 1892
- Buller Irvine Trophy
  - 1893
- Williams Burt Trophy
  - 1895
- Allan Trophy
  - 1896
- Healesville Hotel Trophy
  - 1897
- The Henry Trophy
  - 1900
- Con Dwyer Trophy
  - 1903
- Guardian Newspaper Trophy
  - 1906
- Yarra Valley Football Association
  - 1910, 1915, 1919, 1922, 1923, 1924, 1936, 1938, 1946.
- Yarra Flats Football Association
  - 1913
- Ringwood District Football Association
  - 1940
- Eastern Football League
  - Division Four
    - 1988
- Eastern Football League
  - Division Three
    - 1991
- Eastern Football League
  - Division Two
    - 1996, 1998, 2003, 2011.

== VFL / AFL Players ==
The following footballers played with Lilydale, prior to playing senior football in the VFL/AFL, and / or drafted, with the year indicating their VFL/AFL debut.

- 1921 - Frank Maher - Essendon:
- 1923 - Herbie Brunning - Richmond:
- 1989 - Fraser Brown – Carlton: 177 games, 1995 Premiership
- 1989 - Ashley Matthews – Carlton 9 games – Fitzroy: 6 games
- 1999 - Adrian Cox – Hawthorn: 54 games
- 2011 - Kieran Harper - North Melbourne: 40 games
