= Olinda-Ferny Creek Football Club =

Olinda-Ferny Creek Football Netball Club

Names
- Full name: Olinda-Ferny Creek Football Netball Club
- Nickname: Bloods

Club details
- Founded: 1908
- Competition: Outer East Football Netball League
- President: Ben Selby Hele
- Ground: Olinda Recreation Reserve, Olinda

The Olinda-Ferny Creek Football Club was formed in 1908 and is based at the Olinda Recreation Reserve, Olinda, Victoria.

The club is known as "The Bloods" and play in the Premier Division of the Outer East Football Netball League. They wear a white jumper with a red “vee”.

== Premierships ==
Premierships:

Men’s Football Seniors: 1910, 1924, 1932 1965, 1966, 1967, 1978, 1988, 2005, 2009, 2017 Reserves: 2009, 2016 Under 18s: 2009,2010, 2013

Netball A Grade: 2015, 2017, 2018, 2019, 2022 D Grade: 2014, 2015, 2017

Women’s Football Seniors: 2023

== Club history ==
The Olinda-Ferny Creek Football Club is a merger of the Olinda Football Club (founded 1908, disbanded 1914) and the Ferny Creek Football Club (founded 1910, disbanded 1933). Trevor Billington coached the club to three flags in a row in the mid-1960s.

Best & Fairests Michael Scott (8 times) 1990 /92 / 97 / 98 / 01 / 02 / 03 / 04 Tim Scott (5 times) 1995 / 96 / 99 / 00 / 05 Matthew Scharenberg (4 times) 2021 / 22 / 23 / 24 Marcus Hottes (4 times) 2016 / 17 / 18 / 19

== Notable members ==
=== VFL/AFL Members ===
- Andrew McKinnon: Carlton
- Matthew Allan: Carlton, Essendon

=== Others ===
- Jason Wood (played as a junior)
