= Gavan McCarthy =

Australian rules footballer

Personal information
- Full name: Gavan McCarthy
- Born: 16 May 1945 (age 81)
- Original team: Yea
- Height: 183 cm (6 ft 0 in)
- Weight: 86 kg (190 lb)

Playing career^{1}
| Years | Club | Games (Goals) |
| 1965 | North Melbourne | 2 (0) |
- ^{1} Playing statistics correct to the end of 1965.

Gavan McCarthy (born 16 May 1945) is a former Australian rules footballer who played with North Melbourne in the Victorian Football League (VFL).

McCarthy, who was recruited from Yea, made two appearances for North Melbourne in the 1965 VFL season. His brother, Bernie McCarthy, was his teammate in the second of those matches, against Fitzroy at Brunswick Street Oval. He had another brother Shane McCarthy, who played for Geelong.
