= Belgrave Football Club =

Names
- Full name: Belgrave Football Club
- Nickname(s): The Magpies, Belly.

2022 season
- After finals: 8th

Club details
- Founded: 1909
- Colours: Black and White
- Competition: Outer East Football Netball League
- President: Julian Schill
- Coach: Darren Hamilton
- Captain: Josh O'Brien

Other information
- Official website: SportingPulse homepage

Belgrave Football Club, nicknamed The Magpies, competes in the Outer East Football Netball League. Belgrave had competed in the YVMDFL since 1966 where it was a founder member. After winning the 2012 Division 2 Premiership Belgrave return to Division 1 for the first time in years. A very disappointing year in 2016, saw Belgrave drop back down into Division 2. The club rallied and won the premiership in both the Senior and Reserve Grades, however the club again struggled to remain competitive during the 2018 season, finishing a disappointing second last. With the YVMDFL merging leagues with the SFL to create the AFL Outer East competition, Belgrave have the opportunity to regroup and rebuild.

== History ==
=== Humble beginnings (1909–1944) ===
Belgrave enjoyed early success in the Evelyn Football Association (EFA) winning their first premiership in 1911. Despite finals appearances in the Scoresby District Football Association Belgrave had to wait more than three decades for their elusive second premiership.

=== Golden era (1945–1965) ===
In 1945 Belgrave joined the Mountain District Football Association. This move proved to be the start of Belgrave's golden era. Between 1948 and 1954 Belgrave played in every grand final winning premierships in 1948, 1950, 1951, 1952, 1953 and 1954. Among the key members of these premiership winning combinations were the Argoon brothers, Don and Keith, Alan Burt, Ted Fitton, Jack Graham, Les Hayes, Mick James, Jack McSween, Jack Needs, Denis O'Donohue, John Skelton, Jack Paterson, Don Pitts, Ron Prendergast, Harry Preston, Fred Rafton, Hugh Robertson, Jim Stump, Jack Hill, and John Taylor.

=== YVMDFL (1966–2005) ===
The Belgrave U'16 team won the premiership in 1968 . The Senior team won back to back First Division Premierships in 1975 and 1976. Between 1990 and 1995 Belgrave won four Under 18's premierships. These successes ultimately culminated in a 1999 YVMDFL Division 2 Grand Final victory led by club Best and Fairest winner Ben "Fidgey" Fidge. This was followed with finals appearances in Division 1 and the Magpies remained in this division until 2006.

=== Recent history (2006–2018) ===
2008 saw Belgrave consider a move to the Eastern Football League beginning in the 2009 season. This followed local rivals Belgrave South's transition there after 2007. The EFL offered greater potential sponsorship income and more teams in closer proximity than the YVMDFL. The move was supported by many players and stakeholders but fell through due to factors outside Belgrave's control. Since the failed move many of the club's most talented players have left the club. The exodus has however given many fringe and reserves players the chance to prove their talent. The exodus allowed the club to rebuild from the bottom up. The renovation of the club's ground in 2010 was a starting point. 2012 saw Ben Collins take the reins with best mate Sean Stanton and the combination guided the club to a big win in that years Grand Final, thumping Yarra Glen to the tune of 7 goals. Redemption was sweet for all the true 'Belgrave' people who stood by the club during the dark times of years previous. A strong season in 2013 saw the pies go down to eventual Premier, Woori Yallock, by 2 goals in the Preliminary Final. Lean years again set in seeing the club relegated again at the end of the 2016 season. A solid year followed in 2017 and the club secured promotion back into Division 1 with a massive come from behind win against Yarra Glen. Trailing by 11 goals midway during the second quarter, the club rallied and ran out 4 goal winners.

=== 2022 and Beyond ===
The introduction of the AFL Outer East Competition gives Belgrave the chance again to reset. Darren Hamilton takes over as Senior Coach and under his guidance, the young playing group have embraced the game plan and structures. The young group, led by seasoned veterans, will be hoping to make their way back up the ladder in season 2023 and beyond.

== Jumper ==
Traditionally wearing a black and white striped jumper with magpie ensign. In 2009, Belgrave's Centenary year, it converted to a black jumper featuring a magpie ensign with white and yellow trim. The club transitioned to a black and white stripe with magpie insignia for the 2010 season before a new Port Adelaide magpie style jumper was introduced for the 2018 season. For the 2022 season and beyond, the club, wanting to move away from some troubled times, have reverted back to the black and white stripes with magpie ensign jumper design.

== Rivalries ==
=== Upwey-Tecoma ===
Undoubtedly Belgrave's most fierce rivalry is with their local nemesis, the Upwey-Tecoma Tigers. Upwey was originally formed by disgruntled ex-Belgrave players and have since gone on to become the most successful YVMDFL club winning 11 premierships to Belgrave's 2. 2013 saw the clubs play each other in Division 1 for the first time since 2006. Belgrave struggled again seeing some score-lines blow out against Upwey. With Upwey Starting the new competition in the Premier Division, the rivalry has again been put on hold.

=== South Belgrave ===
Following Upwey is the rivalry with neighbours, the South Belgrave Saints. In 2008 South Belgrave moved to the stronger Eastern Football League thus no longer play Belgrave in competitive matches.

== Notable former players ==
- Mick Dodson (Australian of the Year)
- John Rombotis (Richmond)
- Alan Dale (Essendon, St Kilda)
- Jack Graham (South Melbourne)
- John Taylor Jnr (West Adelaide, Glenelg)
- Leigh Osborne (Gold Coast Suns)
- Darren Crocker (North Melbourne)

== Club records ==
YVMDFL Division 1 Premierships

- 2 (1975, 1976)

YVMDFL Division 1 - Reserve Premierships

- 1 (1974)

YVMDFL Division 1 U'16 Premierships

- 1 (1968)

YVMDFL Division 2 Premierships

- 3 (1999, 2012, 2017)

YVMDFL Division 2 Reserve Premierships

- 4 (1984, 1990, 1991, 2017)

Outer East Division 2 Reserves Premierships

- 1 (2024)

YVMDFL Division 2 Under 18 Premierships

- 7 (1982, 1983, 1984, 1990, 1993, 1994, 1995)

Evelyn Football Association Premierships

- 1 (1911)

Mountain District Football League Premierships

- 6 (1948, 1950, 1951, 1952, 1953, 1954)

== Individual records ==
MDFA Best and Fairest	3	I. Gray (1934), T. Bourke (1954), B. Gillies (1958)
Harold Ramage Medal	1	P. Ferguson (2001)
Jim Wandin Medal	3	G. Meyers (1982), L. Ivanoff (1984), S. Fitzgerald (1990)
Arthur Cowley Medal	3	A. Dean (1982), N. Fage (2007)
Alan Morgan Medal	1	M. Meyer (2012)
