= Alan Rogers (camping) =

Alan Rogers was one of the major personalities whose work created the camping, caravanning and motor caravan industry. After service in the British RAF in the Second World War, Alan devoted his post-war leisure time to his twin passions of rallying and caravanning.

In the early 1960s he, like many other caravanners, had become disillusioned with the quality of campsite information available to the users. He reasoned that what users wanted wasn't a list of facilities available on the site, but an accurate and impartial guide to the way that the site was run.

== First publication ==
In 1968, Rogers published his first guide, the Alan Roger's selected sites for caravanning and camping in Europe. Retailing at four shillings (20p), from small beginnings the guide grew in strength through the years based on its clearly defined statement that the only way sites would be included in the guide was on the basis of quality. In the introduction to the first guide Alan wrote "I would like to stress that the camps which are included in this book have been chosen entirely on merit and no payment of any sort is made by them for their inclusion."

In the same guide Alan accurately predicted trends for the future. For example, he pointed out that a number of overseas sites were providing mains electricity hook-ups and suggested that British caravanners and motor caravanners should take advantage of this by having their units wired to take mains electricity. In 1968 no standard British caravan was supplied with mains electricity wiring. The Alan Rogers' series of guides continued to expand until 1986 when Alan decided to seek retirement.

== Publishing company ==
The eventual purchasers of the Guide's publishing company Deneway Guides and Travel Ltd were Clive and Lois Edwards. Clive Edwards remembers the negotiations with Rogers clearly. "The actual business negotiations were conducted quickly. What Alan was really concerned about was that we would maintain the philosophy and the impartiality of the Guides. Following Alan's retirement we found that he was always willing to offer us advice and guidance".

Perhaps the true measure of the success of the movement that Rogers started is to note how many of the things he called for in his original guide have now become reality. Mains electricity connections in caravans and motor caravans, marked pitches of a minimum size, hot water freely available in the amenity blocks, British style toilets on French campsites, the use of trees and bushes to mark pitches and an end to the practice of over-crowding of sites during the peak summer holiday times.

Many of the sites - like Camping du Pavillon at Bidarte in the Pyrenees recommended by him in 1968 - are still recommended in the current guides, although all the sites have developed along the lines originally recommended by Alan Rogers.

== Death ==
Rogers died on 14 January 2000, aged 81, after suffering from long term illness.

== See also ==
- Alan Rogers Guides
