= Kinglake Football Club =

Football club formed in 1925

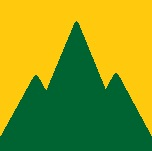
- Full name: Kinglake Football Club
- Nickname: Lakers
- Sport: Australian rules football
- Founded: 1925
- League: Northern Football Netball League
- Home ground: Memorial Oval, Kinglake Central
- President: Clinton Robinson
- Head coach: Andrew Fairchild

The Kinglake Football Club was officially formed in 1925 and is today based at the Kinglake Memorial Oval, Cnr Extons Rd & Kinglake-Whittlesea Rd, Kinglake.

Before the Exton's Rd oval, Kinglake played on the Exton's family land or vacant land behind the Kinglake Hotel in Kinglake.

The club is nicknamed "The Lakers" and today wears a yellow jumper with three green designs shaped as mountains and plays in the Third Division of the Northern Football Netball League. The Lakers currently field a Senior & Reserves team, as well as several junior football teams.

== Premierships (3) ==
Seniors

- 1939, 1940 (Panton Hill & District Football League);
- 1994 (Yarra Valley Mountain District FL, 2nd Division)

== Runners Up (8) ==
- 1933
- 1935
- 1936
- 1995
- 2009
- 2015
- 2016
- 2022

== Club History & Results ==
1930-Kinglake join the Bourke-Evelyn Football League for just this one season
1931-Kinglake join the Panton Hill & District Football Association in its formation year. Other clubs in League were Queenstown (St Andrews), Panton Hill & Yarra Glen.
1932-Kinglake participate in the Panton Hill & District Football League. Panton Hill & Bourke-Evelyn Leagues merge to become Panton Hill & Districts Football League.
1933-Kinglake finish 2nd on Panton Hill & District FL Ladder.
2nd Semi Final: Kinglake def Whittlesea @ Doreen by 9 points
Grand Final:Yarra Glen 10.19 79 def Kinglake 4.11 41 @ Whittlesea
1934-Kinglake finish 4th on PH&DFL Ladder.
1st Semi Final: Panton Hill 10.15 75 def Kinglake 11.8 74
1935-Kinglake finish 2nd on PH&DFL Ladder
Preliminary Final: Kinglake 14.12 96 def Panton Hill 6.9 45
Grand Final: Hurstbridge 15.15 105 def Kinglake 7.8 50
1936-Kinglake finish 2nd on PH&DFL Ladder
Grand Final: Plenty Rovers 11.9 75 def Kinglake (at Whittlesea)
1937-Kinglake and PH&DFL in recess.
1938-Kinglake and PH&DFLin recess.
1939-Kinglake finish 1st on PH&DFL Ladder. Competing clubs are Kinglake, Panton Hill & Hurstbridge
Grand Final: Kinglake d Hurstbridge (Venue unknown)
1940-Kinglake finish 1st on PH&DFL Ladder.
2nd Semi Final: Kinglake d Plenty Rovers (at Whittlesea)
Grand Final: Kinglake 7.15 57 def Plenty Rovers 7.12 54 (at Whittlesea)
1941 to 1946-League in recess due to World War II
1947-Kinglake change from light blue to green jumper with yellow "V". League reforms as Panton Hill Football League
1948-1956-Kinglake participate in PHFL
1980-Kinglake's final season in Panton Hill Football League. 1981-1989-Kinglake in recess.
1990-Kinglake reform, join the Yarra Valley Mountain District Football League nd Division Two and change to a yellow jumper with a green "V".
1994-Kinglake win YVMDFL 2nd Division Premiership.
1996-Kinglake join the Diamond Valley Football League.
2002-Kinglake change jumper from yellow with green "V" to dark green with three yellow 'tiger slashes" across the left shoulder.
31 Jan 2007-Kinglake starts 2007 pre-season training. 1 May 2007-Diamond Valley Football League (DVFL) changes its name to Northern Football League (NFL), after it is discovered some DVFL funds have gone astray.
21/5/2007-NFL Board rules that Kinglake forfeited Round 2 (vs Parkside) and awards the 4 premiership points to Parkside FC. Kinglake believed the ground was too hard (and therefore dangerous) to play on. Information from Kinglake Football Club records; Mountain Monthly magazine; Evelyn Observer; Diamond Valley News; The Diamond Valley Story; Living Memories-A History of Kinglake Vols 1 & 2; and interviews with long-time Kinglake and district residents.
2008-Kinglake moves to the Yarra Valley Mountain District Football League Division 2 finishing 5th and includes A & B Grade Netball Teams for the first time. B grade team makes the finals.
