= Allen Rogers (footballer) =

Australian rules footballer

Allen Leonard Rogers

Personal information
- Full name: Allen Leonard Rogers
- Nickname: Bill
- Born: 9 August 1930; Yea
- Died: 25 September 2017 (aged 87)
- Original teams: Yea, Rochester
- Height: 173 cm (5 ft 8 in)
- Weight: 67 kg (148 lb)

Playing career^{1}
Years	Club	Games (Goals)
1952–1953	Footscray	22 (13)
- ^{1} Playing statistics correct to the end of 1953.

Allen Leonard Rogers (9 August 1930 – 25 September 2017) was an Australian rules footballer who played for the Footscray Football Club in the Victorian Football League (VFL).

Rogers was originally from Yea in the Waranga North East Football Association and won the 1950 WNEFA best and fairest award.
