= Matthew McCarthy =

Australian rules footballer

Personal information
- Full name: Matthew McCarthy
- Born: 14 December 1981 (age 44)
- Original team: Old Xaverians
- Height: 198 cm (6 ft 6 in)
- Weight: 105 kg (231 lb)

Playing career^{1}
Years	Club	Games (Goals)
2003–2006	Geelong	22 (24)
- ^{1} Playing statistics correct to the end of 2006.

Matthew McCarthy (born 14 December 1981) is a former Australian rules footballer for the Geelong Football Club in the Australian Football League (AFL), playing 22 games between 2003 and 2006. He is the brother of deceased Port Adelaide player John McCarthy.
