= 2025 EFNL season =

63rd season of the Eastern Football Netball League

- Date: 29 March - 20 September 2024
- Teams: 46

The 2025 EFNL season is the 63rd season of the Eastern Football Netball League (EFNL), the Australian rules football competition based largely in the eastern suburbs of metropolitan Melbourne, Victoria. The season features 46 clubs across five divisions and will run from 29 March to 20 September, with each division comprising an 18-round home-and-away season, followed by a four-week finals series featuring the top five teams. (Note: Division 4 will hold a three-week finals series featuring the top four teams.)

== Background ==
=== Team changes ===
The following teams changed division after the 2024 season:

2025 EFNL season
Division	Promoted to division ▲	Relegated to division ▼	Withdrawn	New club
Premier	Mitcham	N/A	None	None
1	Boronia	Norwood	Doncaster (Note: Doncaster entered recess ahead of the 2025 season.)	None
2	Surrey Park	Wantirna South	None	None
3	Scoresby	The Basin	None	None
4	N/A	Warrandyte	Nunawading (Note: Nunawading pulled their senior and reserve sides ahead of the 2025 season; they fielded an U19.5 team.)	Bullen Templestowe (Note: Bulleen Templestowe transferred to the EFNL from the VAFA following the 2024 season.)

== Premier Division ==
2024 Premier Division season
- Date: 12 April - 20 September 2024
- Teams: 10

=== Ladder ===
Pos	Team	Pld	W	L	D	PF	PA	PP	Pts	Qualification
1	Blackburn	18	16	2	0	1782	1222	145.8	64	Finals series
2	East Ringwood	18	13	5	0	1520	1017	149.5	52	Finals series
3	Balwyn (P)	18	12	6	0	1476	1240	119.0	48	Finals series
4	Rowville	18	10	8	0	1410	1139	123.8	40	Finals series
5	South Croydon	18	9	9	0	1242	1394	89.1	36	Finals series
6	Noble Park	18	9	9	0	1192	1431	83.3	36	
7	Vermont	18	8	10	0	1175	1392	84.4	32	
8	Doncaster East	18	7	11	0	1372	1500	91.5	28	
9	Berwick	18	5	13	0	1101	1340	82.2	20	
10	Mitcham (R)	18	1	17	0	1154	1749	66.0	4	Relegation to Division 1

Updated to match(es) played on 20 September 2026. Source: PlayHQ
Rules for classification: 1) points; 2) percentage; 3) points for
(P) Premiers; (R) Relegated

=== Finals ===
Qualifying and elimination finals
30 August, Holm Park
2	East Ringwood	6.12 (48)
3	Balwyn	9.5 (59)
31 August, Jubilee Park
4	Rowville	9.9 (63)
5	South Croydon	8.8 (56)

Semi-finals
6 September, Holm Park
1	Blackburn	6.8 (44)
Balwyn	13.13 (91)
7 September, Jubilee Park
East Ringwood	4.11 (35)
South Croydon	14.12 (96)

Preliminary final
13 September, Holm Park
Blackburn	18.5 (113)
Rowville	8.15 (63)

Grand final
20 September, Bayswater Oval
Balwyn	8.4 (52)
Blackburn	7.7 (49)

2025 EFNL Men's Premier Division Grand Final
Saturday, 20 September (2:30pm)	Balwyn	v	Blackburn	Bayswater Oval
2.1 (13); 2.1 (13); 4.4 (28); 8.4 (52)	Q1; Q2; Q3; Final	1.0 (6); 1.5 (11); 5.5 (35); 7.7 (49)	Cliff Tomkins Medal: Jarrod Lienert (Balwyn)
J Lienert 2, N Oakes 2, J Tillig 2, K Turner 1, A Urban 1	Goals
J Lienert, K Turner, B Silvagni, J Tillig, A Urban, C Andersen	Best	L Harry, B Hicks, R Stoddart, C Oglethorpe, L Bugeja, W Oglethorpe
Blackburn did not provide a list of goalkickers.

== Division 1 ==
2025 Division 1 season
- Date: 5 April - 13 September 2024
- Teams: 9 (Note: Doncaster entered recess ahead of the 2025 season; Mooroolbark did not field an U19.5 side.)

=== Seniors ===
==== Ladder ====
Pos	Team	Pld	W	L	D	PF	PA	PP	Pts	Qualification
1	South Belgrave	7	7	0	0	865	382	226.4	28	Finals series
2	Park Orchards	7	6	1	0	696	480	145.0	24	Finals series
3	Beaconsfield	7	5	2	0	516	376	137.2	20	Finals series
4	Boronia	7	4	3	0	571	489	116.8	16	Finals series
5	Montrose	7	3	4	0	611	581	105.2	12	Finals series
6	North Ringwood	7	3	4	0	565	622	90.8	12	
7	Mooroolbark	7	2	5	0	434	520	83.5	8	
8	Bayswater	7	2	5	0	432	618	69.9	8	
9	Norwood	8	0	8	0	405	1027	39.4	0	

Updated to match(es) played on 31 May 2025. Source: PlayHQ
Rules for classification: 1) points; 2) percentage; 3) points for

=== Reserves ===
Spurce:

==== Ladder ====
Pos	Team	Pld	W	L	D	PF	PA	PP	Pts	Qualification
1	Park Orchards	7	7	0	0	643	233	276.0	28	Finals series
2	South Belgrave	7	6	1	0	619	203	304.9	24	Finals series
3	Beaconsfield	7	6	1	0	628	239	262.8	24	Finals series
4	Montrose	7	4	3	0	462	383	120.6	16	Finals series
5	North Ringwood	7	3	4	0	453	392	115.6	12	Finals series
6	Boronia	7	3	4	0	367	415	88.4	12	
7	Bayswater	7	2	5	0	239	405	59.0	8	
8	Mooroolbark	7	1	6	0	177	541	32.7	4	
9	Norwood	8	0	8	0	102	879	11.6	0	

Updated to match(es) played on 31 May 2025. Source: PlayHQ
Rules for classification: 1) points; 2) percentage; 3) points for

=== U19.5 ===
==== Ladder ====
Pos	Team	Pld	W	L	D	PF	PA	PP	Pts	Qualification
1	Beaconsfield	8	7	1	0	647	263	246.0	28	Finals series
2	Park Orchards	8	7	1	0	800	346	231.2	28	Finals series
3	Montrose	8	6	2	0	631	419	150.6	24	Finals series
4	South Belgrave	8	5	2	1	734	252	291.3	22	Finals series
5	North Ringwood	8	3	4	1	597	489	122.1	14	Finals series
6	Norwood	8	2	6	0	284	804	35.3	8	
7	Boronia	8	1	7	0	274	625	43.8	4	
8	Bayswater	8	0	8	0	145	914	15.9	0	

Updated to match(es) played on 31 May 2025. Source: PlayHQ
Rules for classification: 1) points; 2) percentage; 3) points for

== Division 2 ==
2025 Division 2 season
- Date: 5 April - 14 September 2024
- Teams: 10 (Note: Templestowe did not field an U19.5 side)

=== Seniors ===
==== Ladder ====
Pos	Team	Pld	W	L	D	PF	PA	PP	Pts	Qualification
1	Templestowe	8	7	1	0	708	416	170.2	28	Finals series
2	Wantirna South	8	6	2	0	743	576	129.0	24	Finals series
3	Surrey Park	8	6	2	0	665	544	122.2	24	Finals series
4	Croydon	8	4	4	0	492	459	107.2	16	Finals series
5	Mulgrave	8	4	4	0	656	615	106.7	16	Finals series
6	Heathmont	8	3	5	0	472	505	93.5	12	
7	Waverley Blues	8	3	5	0	550	692	79.5	12	
8	Ringwood	8	3	5	0	408	628	65.0	12	
9	East Burwood	8	2	6	0	488	490	99.6	8	
10	Lilydale	8	2	6	0	388	645	60.2	8	Relegation to Division 3

Updated to match(es) played on 31 May 2025. Source: PlayHQ
Rules for classification: 1) points; 2) percentage; 3) points for

=== Reserves ===
==== Ladder ====
Pos	Team	Pld	W	L	D	PF	PA	PP	Pts	Qualification
1	Croydon	8	7	1	0	505	232	217.7	28	Finals series
2	Surrey Park	8	7	1	0	603	290	207.9	28	Finals series
3	East Burwood	8	5	2	1	393	303	129.7	22	Finals series
4	Lilydale	8	5	3	0	348	312	111.5	20	Finals series
5	Mulgrave	8	4	4	0	456	385	118.4	16	Finals series
6	Wantirna South	8	4	4	0	385	427	90.2	16	
7	Templestowe	8	4	4	0	266	376	70.7	16	
8	Heathmont	8	1	6	1	367	543	67.6	6	
9	Waverley Blues	8	1	7	0	309	456	67.8	4	
10	Ringwood	8	1	7	0	234	542	43.2	4	

Updated to match(es) played on 31 May 2025. Source: PlayHQ
Rules for classification: 1) points; 2) percentage; 3) points for

=== U19.5 ===
==== Ladder ====
Pos	Team	Pld	W	L	D	PF	PA	PP	Pts	Qualification
1	Surrey Park	7	6	1	0	620	174	356.3	24	Finals series
2	Mulgrave	8	6	2	0	611	345	177.1	24	Finals series
3	Waverley Blues	7	5	2	0	375	285	131.6	20	Finals series
4	Ringwood	7	5	2	0	336	301	111.6	20	Finals series
5	Lilydale	7	3	4	0	390	416	93.8	12	Finals series
6	East Burwood	7	3	4	0	310	363	85.4	12	
7	Wantirna South	7	2	5	0	319	448	71.2	8	
8	Croydon	7	1	6	0	262	572	45.8	4	
9	Heathmont	7	1	6	0	225	544	41.4	4	

Updated to match(es) played on 31 May 2025. Source: PlayHQ
Rules for classification: 1) points; 2) percentage; 3) points for

== Division 3 ==
2025 Division 3 season
- Date: 29 March - 6 September 2024
- Teams: 10 (Note: Coldstream, Oakleigh District, Silvan and The Basin did not field U19.5 teams and were replaced by Berwick Reserves and Surrey Park Reserves)

=== Seniors ===
==== Ladder ====
Pos	Team	Pld	W	L	D	PF	PA	PP	Pts	Qualification
1	Donvale	9	8	1	0	1019	504	202.2	32	Finals series
2	Scoresby	9	7	2	0	828	507	163.3	28	Finals series
3	Knox	9	6	3	0	757	671	112.8	24	Finals series
4	Upper Ferntree Gully	9	5	4	0	688	579	118.8	20	Finals series
5	Silvan	9	5	4	0	745	782	95.3	20	Finals series
6	The Basin	9	5	4	0	585	628	93.2	20	
7	Ferntree Gully	9	4	5	0	605	637	95.0	16	
8	Oakleigh District	9	3	6	0	619	836	74.0	12	
9	Coldstream	9	1	8	0	484	779	62.1	4	
10	Fairpark	9	1	8	0	475	882	53.9	4	Relegation to Division 4

Updated to match(es) played on 7 June 2025. Source: PlayHQ
Rules for classification: 1) points; 2) percentage; 3) points for

=== Reserves ===
==== Ladder ====
Pos	Team	Pld	W	L	D	PF	PA	PP	Pts	Qualification
1	Donvale	9	8	1	0	1079	272	396.7	32	Finals series
2	Upper Ferntree Gully	9	8	1	0	666	338	197.0	32	Finals series
3	Scoresby	9	7	2	0	708	348	203.4	28	Finals series
4	Knox	9	6	3	0	789	414	190.6	24	Finals series
5	The Basin	9	6	3	0	635	353	179.9	24	Finals series
6	Ferntree Gully	9	4	5	0	598	425	140.7	16	
7	Silvan	9	3	6	0	595	665	89.5	12	
8	Oakleigh District	9	1	8	0	313	992	31.6	4	
9	Coldstream	9	1	8	0	229	936	24.5	4	
10	Fairpark	9	1	8	0	226	1095	20.6	4	

Updated to match(es) played on 7 June 2025. Source: PlayHQ
Rules for classification: 1) points; 2) percentage; 3) points for

=== U19.5 ===
==== Ladder ====
Pos	Team	Pld	W	L	D	PF	PA	PP	Pts	Qualification
1	Knox	8	8	0	0	955	161	593.2	32	Finals series
2	Scoresby	8	6	2	0	652	332	196.4	24	Finals series
3	Donvale	8	5	3	0	603	321	187.9	20	Finals series
4	Upper Ferntree Gully	8	5	3	0	486	407	119.4	20	Finals series
5	Surrey Park Reserves	8	4	4	0	472	475	99.4	16	Finals series
6	Ferntree Gully	8	4	4	0	452	575	78.6	16	
7	Berwick Reserves	8	0	8	0	253	670	37.8	0	
8	Fairpark	8	0	8	0	104	1036	10.0	0	

Updated to match(es) played on 7 June 2025. Source: PlayHQ
Rules for classification: 1) points; 2) percentage; 3) points for

== Division 4 ==
2025 Division 4 season
- Date: 5 April - 7 September 2024
- Teams: 7 (Note: Nunawading withdrew their senior and reserve teams prior to the start of the season; Bulleen Templestowe entered the EFNL over the off-season; 9 teams competed in U19.5; Chirnside Park, Croydon North MLOC and Forest Hill did not field U19.5 teams and were replaced by Bayswater Reserves, Knox Reserves, Montrose Reserves and Scoresby Reserves)

=== Seniors ===
==== Ladder ====
Note: (Note: Due to an uneven fixture, this competition used match ratio (WPCT).)

Pos	Team	Pld	W	L	D	PF	PA	PP	WPCT	Qualification
1	Chirnside Park	7	6	1	0	703	473	148.6	85.71	Finals series
2	Whitehorse Pioneers	6	5	1	0	542	423	128.1	83.33	Finals series
3	Kilsyth	7	5	2	0	513	368	139.4	71.43	Finals series
4	Warrandyte	7	3	4	0	469	438	107.1	42.86	Finals series
5	Croydon North MLOC	7	3	4	0	555	525	105.7	42.86	
6	Bulleen Templestowe	7	2	5	0	465	527	88.2	28.57	
7	Forest Hill	7	0	7	0	367	860	42.7	0.00	

Updated to match(es) played on 31 May 2025. Source: PlayHQ
Rules for classification: 1) match ratio (WPCT); 2) percentage; 3) points for

=== Reserves ===
==== Ladder ====
Note:

Pos	Team	Pld	W	L	D	PF	PA	PP	WPCT	Qualification
1	Whitehorse Pioneers	6	5	1	0	497	223	222.9	83.33	Finals series
2	Warrandyte	7	5	2	0	552	252	219.0	71.43	Finals series
3	Kilsyth	7	5	2	0	486	284	171.1	71.43	Finals series
4	Chirnside Park	7	4	3	0	492	405	121.5	57.14	Finals series
5	Bulleen Templestowe	7	3	4	0	352	446	78.9	42.86	
6	Croydon North MLOC	7	2	5	0	366	443	82.6	28.57	
7	Forest Hill	7	0	7	0	153	845	18.1	0.00	

Updated to match(es) played on 31 May 2025. Source: PlayHQ
Rules for classification: 1) match ratio (WPCT); 2) percentage; 3) points for

=== U19.5 ===
==== Ladder ====
Pos	Team	Pld	W	L	D	PF	PA	PP	Pts	Qualification
1	Bulleen Templestowe	7	7	0	0	603	231	261.0	28	Finals series
2	Kilsyth	7	6	1	0	812	126	644.4	24	Finals series
3	Whitehorse Pioneers	7	5	2	0	586	273	214.7	20	Finals series
4	Knox Reserves	8	5	3	0	625	464	134.7	20	Finals series
5	Warrandyte	7	4	3	0	795	300	265.0	16	
6	Montrose Reserves	7	2	5	0	339	605	56.0	8	
7	Scoresby Reserves	7	1	6	0	273	598	45.7	4	
8	Nunawading	7	1	6	0	268	674	39.8	4	
9	Bayswater Reserves	7	1	6	0	116	1146	10.1	4	

Updated to match(es) played on 31 May 2025. Source: PlayHQ
Rules for classification: 1) points; 2) percentage; 3) points for
