= 2020 in Australian rules football in Victoria =

2020 Victorian football season
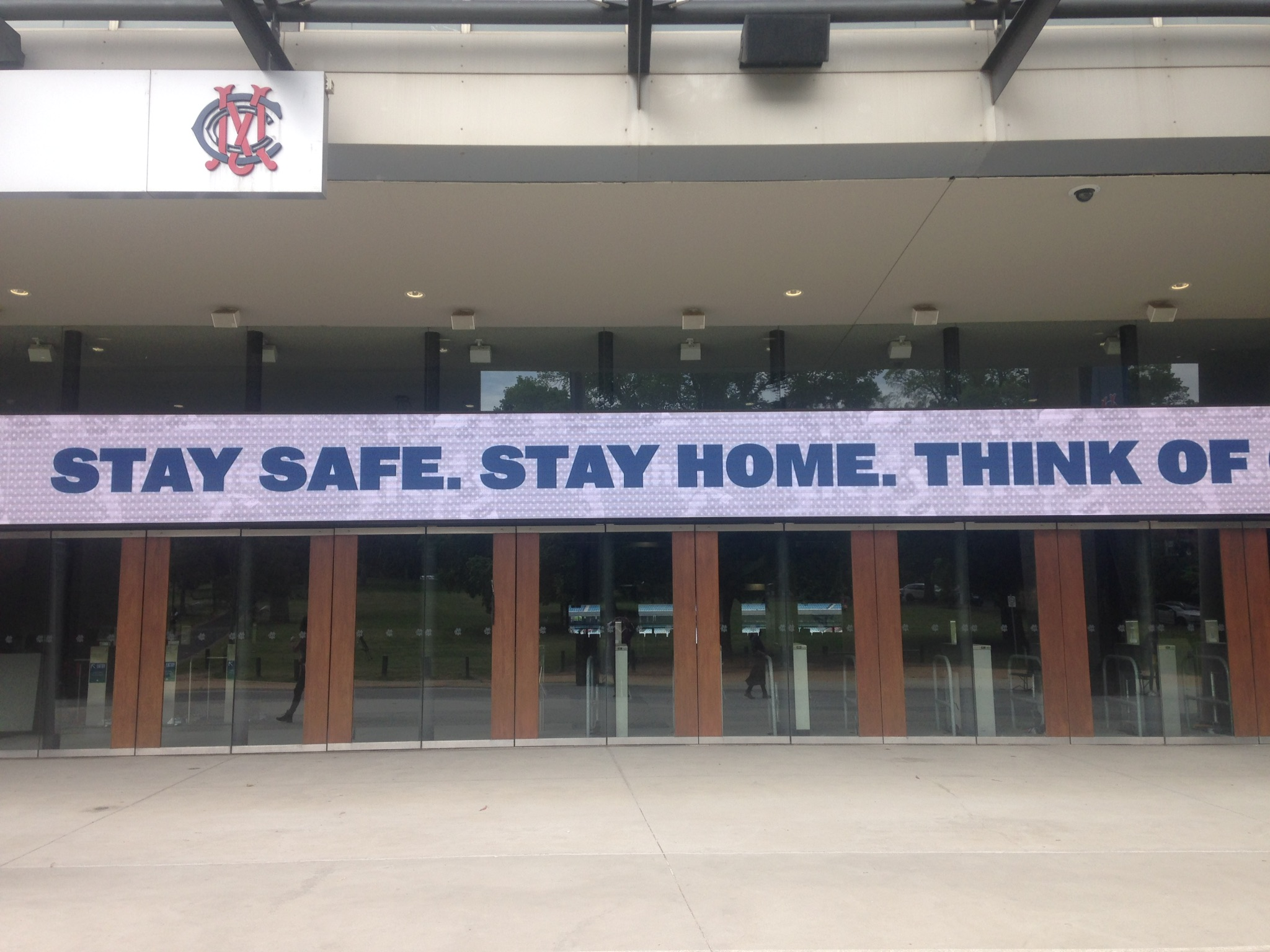
- The MCG on the eve of the AFL Grand Final

The 2020 Victorian football season was the 151st senior season of Australian rules football in Victoria. All 86 leagues, including the state-level Victorian Football League (VFL), cancelled their seasons due to the COVID-19 pandemic.

== Background ==
=== Community Championships ===
On 18 November 2019, AFL Victoria announced that the Community Championships would not take place in 2020. The statewide interleague carnival featured 30 teams in 2019, although the Central Highlands Football League (CHFL) had announced in October 2019 that it would not participate in 2020. The Northern Football Netball League (NFNL) was the highest-ranked league going into the 2020 season.

=== Alberton Football Netball League ===
The Alberton Football Netball League (AFNL) had undergone a number of structural changes following a review conducted by AFL Gippsland in 2015, which included five clubs leaving to join the newly-formed West Gippsland Football Netball Competition in 2017. A further review was released in August 2018, which proposed merging the AFNL with the Mid Gippsland Football Netball League (MGFNL) to form the Central & Southern Gippsland Competition, but this did not occur after opposition from the MGFNL. In April 2019, the remaining six AFNL clubs applied to join the Ellinbank and District Football Netball League (EDFNL) for the 2020 season, but all were unsuccessful.

On 22 June 2020, AFL Gippsland released the Gippsland 2025 Strategic Plan (G25 Strategy), which recommended that the AFNL merge with the MGFNL. The MGFNL opposed a merger, but voted on 24 August 2020 to accept all six AFNL clubs into its senior competition for the 2021 season. At the AFNL's annual general meeting on 25 November 2020, a special resolution to disband the league was passed.

=== Other notes ===
This was the first season of the Eastern Football Netball League (EFNL) under that name, after the competition rebranded from the "Eastern Football League" on 15 October 2019.

== Impact of the COVID-19 pandemic ==
Practice matches took place in February and early March throughout various Victorian leagues. All competitions were disrupted by the COVID-19 pandemic, which was formally declared a pandemic on 11 March 2020. The start of the VFL season was suspended indefinitely on 16 March, with all local leagues also advised to suspend their seasons until at least 31 May.

On 22 May, the Heathcote District Football Netball League (HDFNL) became the first senior competition in Victoria to cancel its season outright. Restricted training – including players split into groups of ten while following social distancing rules – was permitted statewide from 25 May.

The Victorian government announced on 14 June that local sporting competitions would be allowed to resume full contact training on 13 July, with leagues able to begin their seasons one week later on 20 July.

Despite the planned easing of restrictions, all community leagues announced the cancellations of their senior seasons by 2 July, with many citing club withdrawals and financial difficulties. The Victorian Amateur Football Association (VAFA), the largest senior community football competition in Victoria, made the decision to cancel its season on 1 July. The final local competition to cancel its senior season was the Southern Football Netball League (SFNL), which made its announcement on 3 July.

On 7 July, the second wave of COVID-19 cases across Melbourne resulted in a new lockdown being imposed by the state government, which all but precluded organised sport in the state until at least 19 August (ultimately lasting several months beyond that). The following day, the VFL announced that it would cancel its season outright.

Despite the cancelled senior season, the Bendigo Football Netball League (BFNL) held round 1 of its junior competition seasons (including under-18s) on 18 July and 19 July. The junior competitions were cancelled on 3 August without any further matches being played. A planned four-team VFL Women's (VFLW) "Super Series" was scheduled to be held in September 2020, but was cancelled on 4 August.

=== Season cancellation dates ===
League	Date	Ref
Alberton	29 June 2020	
Ballarat	25 June 2020	
Bellarine	9 June 2020	
Bendigo	1 July 2020	
Central Highlands	30 June 2020	
Central Murray	10 June 2020	
Colac & District	9 June 2020	
East Gippsland	24 June 2020	
East Gippsland Juniors	5 August 2020	
Eastern	3 June 2020	
Ellinbank & District	30 June 2020	
Essendon District	30 June 2020	
Geelong	9 June 2020	
Geelong & District	9 June 2020	
Gippsland	27 June 2020	
Golden Rivers	10 June 2020	
Goulburn Valley	23 June 2020	
Heathcote District	22 May 2020	
Kyabram District	28 May 2020	
Maryborough Castlemaine District	26 June 2020	
Millewa	26 May 2020	
Mornington Peninsula Nepean	27 June 2020	
Murray	23 June 2020	
Northern	3 June 2020	
Outer East	2 July 2020	
Picola & District	29 June 2020	
South Metro Junior	16 July 2020	
Southern	3 July 2020	
Tallangatta & District	25 June 2020	
VAFA	1 July 2020	
VFL	8 July 2020	
Yarra Junior	7 August 2020	
