= Paul Barlow =

Australian rules footballer

Personal information
- Full name: Paul Barlow
- Original teams: Scoresby, (EDFL)

Playing career^{1}
Years	Club	Games (Goals)
1988	Richmond	4 (0)
1990	West Adelaide	3 (0)
1991-93	Port Melbourne	38 (2)
- ^{1} Playing statistics correct to the end of 1994.

Paul Barlow is a former Australian rules footballer who played for Richmond in the Victorian Football League (VFL) in 1988. He was recruited from the Scoresby Football Club in the Eastern District Football League (EDFL).

Paul Barlow is the managing director of CAR Group's Australian businesses, leading the strategy and operations of online marketplaces carsales.com.au, bikesales.com.au, boatsales.com.au, trucksales.com.au, caravanandcampingsales.com.au, constructionsales.com.au and farmmachinerysales.com.au along with Redbook Australia & Asia/Pacific (redbook.com.au).
