= John Carpenter (footballer) =

Australian rules footballer

Personal information
- Full name: John A. Carpenter
- Born: 29 August 1948 (age 78)
- Original teams: Ringwood, Heathmont
- Height: 177 cm (5 ft 10 in)
- Weight: 67 kg (148 lb)
- Position: Rover

Playing career^{1}
Years	Club	Games (Goals)
1969	Essendon	2 (1)
- ^{1} Playing statistics correct to the end of 1969.

John Carpenter (born 29 August 1948) is a former Australian rules footballer who played with Essendon in the Victorian Football League (VFL). He later played with McLeod-Rosanna, Bayswater and Oakleigh Districts.
