= Yarra Junior Football League =

Junior Australian rules football competition

- Formerly: Doncaster & Districts Junior Football League; Hawthorn Districts Junior Football League
- Founded: 1997; 29 years ago
- CEO: Tim Murray
- President: Jeff Hooper
- Divisions: 66
- No. of teams: 30
- State: Victoria
- Region: Melbourne
- Official website: yarrajfl.org.au

The Yarra Junior Football League (YJFL) is the largest junior Australian rules football competition in Australia. The league has a total of 30 clubs, who are based around northern, eastern and north-eastern Melbourne. There is a total of 66 divisions throughout the league.

== History ==
The YJFL was formed through the merging of the Doncaster & Districts Junior Football League (DDJFL) and the Hawthorn Districts Junior Football League (HDJFL) in 1997. The league began with a total of 4628 registered players. They were spread out between 180 teams and 25 foundation clubs. Since then, the number of players is over double the original number, with 10,614 players participating in 2019. It has also grown to 508 teams between 30 clubs, as per data gathered in 2019.

In 2000, the Heidelberg Tigers moved into the YJFL after a major club reform. Over the next ten years, 5 teams joined the league, those teams being the Preston Bullants in 2001, the North Brunswick Giants in 2005 (at that time known as the 'Bulls'), the Parkside Devils and certain divisions from the Ashburton Redbacks in 2006, the Boroondara Hawks and the rest of the divisions from the Ashburton Redbacks in 2008, and the Brunswick Dragons in 2010.

In 2011, the first Youth Girls divisions were launched, with some teams given the support of the AFL.

In 2015 and 2016, the league witnessed spikes in growth after they introduced an under-8s competition and the new South Yarra Junior Football Club.

In January 2020, the presidents from the former Greythorn Falcons and Balwyn Tigers decided to merge their clubs into the Balwyn Greythorn Jets Junior Football Club, to create a more powerful club, as they were already located very close together.

== Clubs ==
=== Current clubs ===
Club	Colours	Moniker	Home ground	Former league	Est.	Joined YJFL	Associated senior club
Aquinas		Bloods	JW Manson Reserve, Wantirna	−	2013	2015	Aquinas - VAFA
Ashburton		Redbacks	Burwood Reserve and Ferndale Reserve, Glen Iris	HDJFL	1971	2006	None
Balwyn		Tigers	Balwyn Park, Balwyn and Gordon Barnard Reserve, Balwyn North	−	2023	2024	Balwyn - EFNL
Banyule		Bears	Beverley Road Reserve and AJ Burkitt Oval, Heidelberg	DDJFL	1967	1997	Banyule - NFNL
Beverley Hills		Lions	Zerbes Reserve, Doncaster East	DDJFL	1967	1997	Doncaster East - EFNL
Brunswick		Dragons	Gillon Oval, Brunswick	−	2010	2010	Brunswick - VAFA
Bulleen Templestowe		Bullants	Ted Ajani Reserve, Templestowe Lower	DDJFL	1990	1997	Bulleen Templestowe - EFNL
Bundoora		Bulls	N J Telfer Reserve, Bundoora	DDJFL	1961	1997	Bundoora - NFNL
Camberwell		Sharks	Lynden Park, Camberwell	−	1997	1997	None
Canterbury		Cobras	Canterbury Sportsground, Canterbury	−	1997	1997	Canterbury - VAFA
Doncaster		Cats	Schramms Reserve, Doncaster	DDJFL	1968	1997	Doncaster - EFNL
Fitzroy		Lions	Cox and Olney Ovals, Fairfield; Alfred Crescent and W.T. Peterson Ovals, Fitzroy North; Ramsden Street Reserve, Clifton Hill; Victoria Park, Abbotsford	HDJFL	1993	1997	Fitzroy - VAFA
Glen Iris		Gladiators	T.H. King and Righetti Oval, Glen Iris	HDJFL	1987	1997	None
Hawthorn Citizens		Citz	Victoria Road and Rathmines Road Reserves, Hawthorn East; Glenferrie Oval, Hawthorn	HDJFL	1992	1997	Hawthorn AFC - VAFA
Heidelberg		Tigers	Heidelberg Park and Warringal Park, Heidelberg	−	2000	2000	Heidelberg - NFNL
Ivanhoe		Hoes	Ivanhoe Park, Ivanhoe	DDJFL	1966	1997	Ivanhoe - NFNL
Kew		Comets	Victoria Park, Kew	HDJFL	1971	1997	Kew - VAFA
Kew Rovers		Rovers	Stradbroke Park, Kew East	DDJFL	1971	1997	Kew - VAFA
Macleod		Eagles	Macleod Reserve, Macleod; Greensborough College, Greensborough; De Winton Reserve, Rosanna	NFNL	1968	1997	Macleod - NFNL
Northcote		Cougars	McDonnell Park, Northcote	NFNL	1962	2020	Northcote Park - NFNL
North Brunswick		Giants	Allard Park, Brunswick East	−	2005	2005	North Brunswick - VAFA
Parade St Damians		Saints	Binnak Park, Watsonia North	NFNL	1979	1997	None
Park Orchards North Ringwood Parish		Sharks	Domeney Reserve and Stintons Reserve, Park Orchards	DDJFL	1991	1997	Park Orchards - EFNL
Parkside		Devils	Pitcher Park, Alphington	−	2005	2006	Parkside - VAFA
Preston Bullants		Bullants	H P Zwar Park, Preston	−	2000	2001	Preston Bullants - VAFA
Richmond		Tigers	Citizens Park, Richmond and Kevin Bartlett Complex, Burnley	HDJFL	1973	1997	Richmond Central - VAFA
St Marys Greensborough		Burras	Whatmough Park, Greensborough	DDJFL	1973	1997	St Marys - NFNL
Surrey Park		Panthers	Surrey Park, Box Hill		1994	1997	Surrey Park - EFNL
Warrandyte		Bloods	Warrandyte Reserve, Warrandyte	EDJFL, DDJFL	1975	1997	Warrandyte - EFNL
Whitehorse		Colts	Springfield Reserve, Box Hill North	−	1997	1997	Whitehorse Pioneers - EFNL

- Templestowe known as Doncaster Heights until 2014

=== Former clubs ===
Club	Colours	Moniker	Home Ground	Former League	Est.	Years in YJFL	Associated senior club	Current status
Balwyn		Tigers	Balwyn Park, Balwyn and Gordon Barnard Reserve, Balwyn North			2001-2020	Balwyn - EFNL	Merged; 2020 with Greythorn
Balwyn-Greythorn		Jets	Balwyn Park, Balwyn and Gordon Barnard Reserve, Balwyn North	−	2019	2020-2023	Balwyn - EFNL	Merged; 2023 with Boroondara
Bayswater Bombers		Bombers	Marie Wallace Bayswater Park, Bayswater	−		2012	None	Folded
Boroondara		Hawks	Gordon Barnard Reserve, Balwyn North	−	2008	2008-2023	None	Merged; 2023 with Balwyn-Greythorn
Carlton		Blues	Number 1 Oval, Princes Park, Carlton North	−	2016	2016-2024	None	Folded after 2024 season
Chirnside Park		Panthers	Kimberley Reserve, Chirnside Park	−	1978	2011-2015	Chirnside Park − EFNL	EFNL
East Brighton		Vampires	Hurlingham Reserve, Brighton East	−	1948	2015	East Brighton - SFNL	SMJFL
East Malvern		Knights	Basil Reserve, Malvern East	−	1986	2011	East Malvern − SFNL	SMJFL
Eastern Devils		Devils	Bulleen Park, Bulleen	−	1999	2011-?	Eastern Devils − EFNL	EFNL
Greythorn		Falcons	Greythorn Park, Balwyn North			2001-2020	None	Merged; 2020 with Balwyn
Healesville		Bloods	Don Road Sporting Complex, Healesville	−	1888	2011-2014	Healesville − OEFNL	OEFNL
Highett		Bulldogs	Peterson Street Reserve, Highett	−	1988	2015	Highett - SFNL	SMJFL
Montmorency		Magpies	Montmorency Park, Montmorency		1968	1997-2022	Montmorency - NFNL	NFNL
Seville Ranges		Rangers	Wandin East Recreation Reserve, Wandin East	−	20??	2011-2015	Seville Ranges - VWFL	Folded; 20??
South Yarra		Lions	Leigh Park, Balwyn North	−	2015	2016-2021	South Yarra - SFNL	Folded; 2022
St Peters		Bulldogs	Centenary Park, Bentleigh East	−	1957	2015	None	SMJFL
Templestowe		Dockers	Templestowe Reserve, Templestowe	DDJFL	1969	1997-2025	Templestowe - EFNL	Joined senior teams in Eastern FNL after 2025 season

== Girls football ==
=== Beginnings ===
The first girls division was introduced in the 2011 season as a "Youth Girls" (under-18s) division, which had a total of 10 teams participating. This division also included teams from other leagues that did not have any girls-only divisions. In 2012, a girls under-12s division was formed, with 5 clubs fielding teams in the division. The "Youth Girls" division grew to a total of 12 teams, up two from the year before. One year later, an under 14 girls division was formed to help bridge the gap between the Youth Girls and under 12 girls divisions. It had a total of 4 teams participating in its first year. The number of teams in these divisions nearly doubled in 2014, rising from 17 to 31.

=== 2019−present ===
After only 10 teams in the first year of female-only teams in the Yarra Junior Football League, the total spiked to 122 female-only teams in 2019. There were 2810 female players in the league in 2019, which meant that female-players made up just over a quarter of all players in the league. There are now eight female divisions: Under 10 Girls, Under 11 Girls, Under 12 Girls, Under 13 Girls, Under 14 Girls, Under 15 Girls, Under 16 Girls and the Youth Girls.

== Community ==
=== North East Link Controversy ===
The Yarra Junior Football League community rallied against the controversial North East Link project, due to the removal of their headquarters, which was in the path of the proposed road. The North East Link Authority proposed a new headquarters location at Ford Park, Bellfield, but met resistance from the league due to worries that Ford Park is too far away for many teams in the league.

=== Partnership with Collingwood ===
In early July 2020, it was announced that the Collingwood Football Club would enter a 'Major Community Partnership' with the Yarra Junior Football League. This partnership was formed as a part of an initiative to support grassroots football. Six main projects were announced as part of the partnership, including junior development programs to encourage participation in junior football, sport medical programs and research, fundraising events to raise money, support for talent pathways for junior players through to the elite levels, female football development programs and the development of projects to expand community facilities.

== AFL/AFLW players ==
Many players who went on to play in the Australian Football League (AFL) and AFL Women's (AFLW) began their football careers in the YJFL.

Adelaide Football Club

- Jake Kelly
- David Mackay
- Ayce Taylor
- Ben Crocker

Brisbane Lions Football Club

- Toby Wooller

Carlton Football Club

- Marc Murphy
- Matthew Kreuzer
- Jack Silvagni
- Sam Philp
- Matthew Owies
- Marc Pittonet
- Jack Newnes
- Dylan Buckley

Collingwood Football Club

- Tom Langdon
- Jordan De Goey
- Darcy Moore
- Tom Phillips
- Brayden Sier
- Rupert Wills
- Callum Brown
- Josh Daicos
- Tyler Brown
- Isaac Quaynor
- Finlay Macrae
- Trent Bianco
- Atu Bosenavulagi

Essendon Football Club

- Michael Hurley
- Patrick Ambrose
- Nick Bryan
- Kyle Langford
- James Stewart
- Tom Cutler

Gold Coast Football Club

- Matthew Rowell
- Noah Anderson

Greater Western Sydney Football Club

- Toby Greene
- Aidan Corr

Hawthorn Football Club

- Blake Hardwick
- Tom Mitchell

Melbourne Football Club

- Adam Tomlinson
- Jack Viney
- Christian Petracca
- Ed Langdon

North Melbourne Football Club

- Jamie MacMillan
- Luke McDonald
- Ed Vickers-Willis
- Nick Larkey
- Dom Tyson

Port Adelaide Football Club

- Darcy Byrne-Jones
- Dan Houston

Richmond Football Club

- Jason Castagna
- Kane Lambert
- Patrick Naish

St Kilda Football Club

- Jack Billings
- Jack Sinclair
- Dan Hannebery
- Nick Coffield

Sydney Swans Football Club

- Josh Kennedy
- James Rowbottom
- Justin McInerney

West Coast Football Club

- Luke Shuey
- Andrew Gaff

Western Bulldogs Football Club

- Jack Macrae
- Billy Gowers
- Ed Richards
