= Mac Andrew =

Australian rules footballer (born 2003)

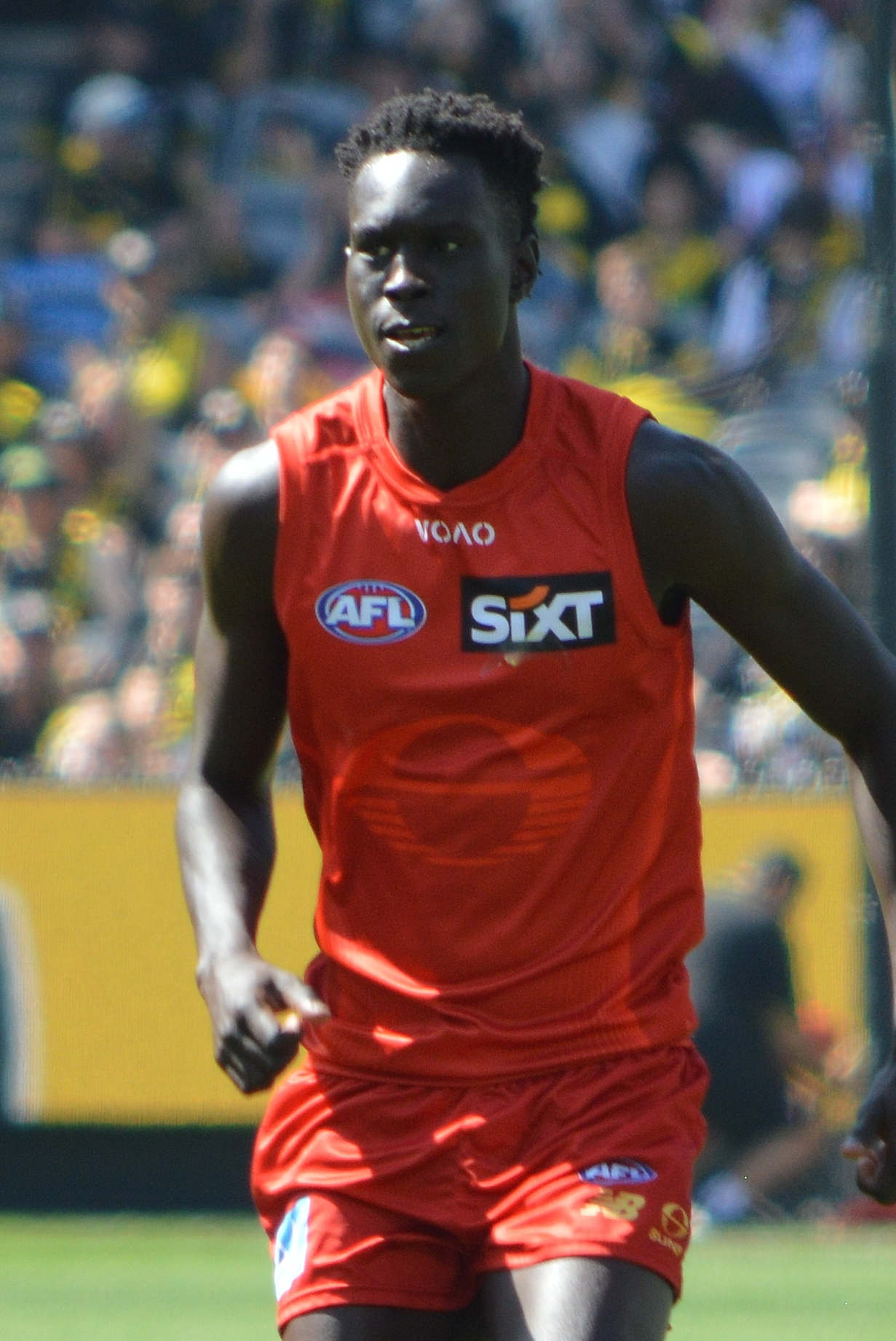
- Andrew in March 2026

Personal information
- Born: 4 December 2003 (age 22); Cairo, Egypt
- Original team: Dandenong Stingrays (NAB League)/Berwick Football Club
- Draft: No. 5, 2021 national draft
- Height: 202 cm (6 ft 8 in)
- Weight: 84 kg (185 lb)
- Position: Utility

Club information
- Current club: Gold Coast
- Number: 1

Playing career^{1}
Years	Club	Games (Goals)
2022–	Gold Coast	88 (14)
- ^{1} Playing statistics correct to the end of 2026.

Career highlights
- 2023 AFL Rising Star nominee; 22under22 team: 2024

Mac Andrew (born 4 December 2003) is a professional Australian rules footballer playing for the Gold Coast Suns in the Australian Football League (AFL).

== Early life ==
Andrew was born in Cairo, Egypt, to South Sudanese parents. In 2005, at 18 months old, he moved to Australia with his family. He began playing Australian rules football for Wantirna South at the under-9s level and later played at Berwick, he also played basketball throughout his upbringing. Andrew progressed through the junior football ranks before being selected to represent the Dandenong Stingrays in the NAB League. He was also a member of the Melbourne Demons' Next Generation Academy but was later ruled ineligible to be selected by the Demons due to restrictions on NGA prospects bid on with first round picks. At the age of 17, Andrew was drafted to the Gold Coast Suns with pick 5 in the 2021 AFL draft and became the first player of South Sudanese heritage to be taken with a top five pick in the national draft. He was educated at St Joseph's College in Ferntree Gully.

== AFL career ==
Andrew made his AFL debut for the Gold Coast Suns at 18 years of age against the West Coast Eagles in round 20 of the 2022 AFL season and became the first Egyptian-born player to debut in the AFL.

In round 22 of the 2024 AFL season, Andrew kicked a goal after the siren to defeat Essendon at Marvel Stadium.

== Statistics ==
Updated to the end of round 22, 2026.

Legend
G	Goals	K	Kicks	D	Disposals	T	Tackles
B	Behinds	H	Handballs	M	Marks

Season	Team	No.	Games	Totals							Averages (per game)							Votes
Season	Team	No.	Games	G	B	K	H	D	M	T	G	B	K	H	D	M	T	Votes
2022	Gold Coast	31	4	0	0	27	15	42	18	8	0.0	0.0	6.8	3.8	10.5	4.5	2.0	0
2023	Gold Coast	31	17	0	0	148	39	187	88	24	0.0	0.0	8.7	2.3	11.0	5.2	1.4	0
2024	Gold Coast	31	20	9	4	199	87	286	118	33	0.5	0.2	10.0	4.4	14.3	5.9	1.7	0
2025	Gold Coast	1	24	3	4	210	123	333	129	26	0.1	0.2	8.8	5.1	13.9	5.4	1.1	0
2026	Gold Coast	1	21	2	2	235	141	376	145	34	0.1	0.1	11.2	6.7	17.9	6.9	1.6	0
Career			86	14	10	819	405	1224	498	125	0.2	0.1	9.5	4.7	14.2	5.8	1.5	0
