= WSFC =

WSFC may refer to:

- WSF Championship, snooker tournament
- WSFC (AM), a radio station (1240 AM) licensed to Somerset, Kentucky, United States
- Walsall Swifts F.C., one of two English association football clubs that merged to form Walsall F.C.
- Wantirna South Football Club, an Australian rules football club
- Western Stima F.C., a Kenyan football club
- Westland Sports F.C., an English association football club
- Windows Server Failover Clustering, a group of independent servers that work together to increase the availability of applications and services.
- Windmill Stars F.C., a Northern Irish association football club
- Witbank Spurs F.C., a South African soccer club
- Woodley Sports F.C., an English association football club
- Worcester Sixth Form College
