= Edwin Flack Reserve =

Sports venue in Berwick, Victoria

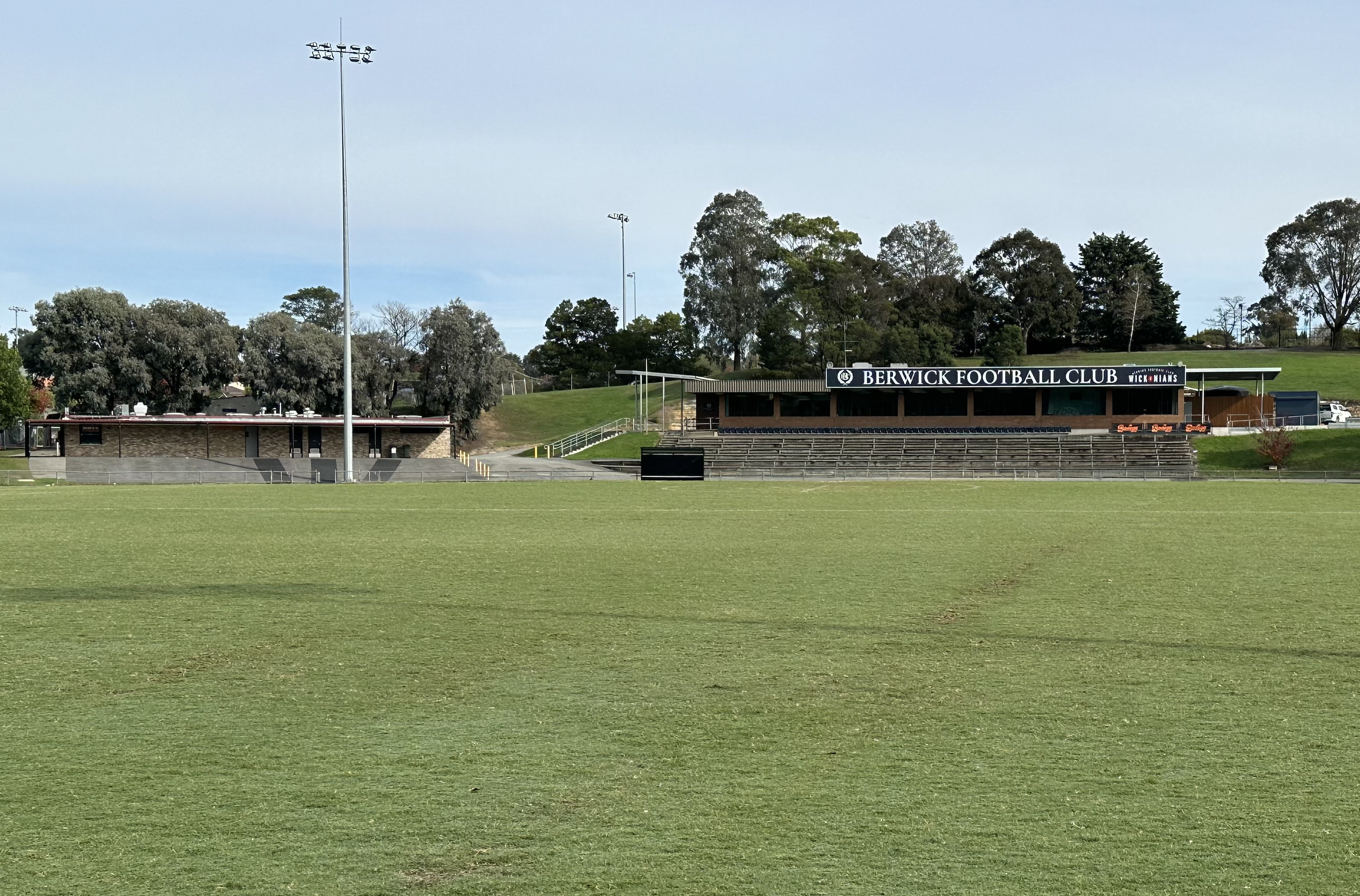
- Interactive map of Edwin Flack Reserve
- Location: Berwick, Victoria
- Coordinates: 38.02864114039991°S 145.36375116793224°E
- Owner: City of Casey

Construction
- Opened: 14 July 1863; 163 years ago

Tenant
- Berwick Football Club (1985–)

Edwin Flack Reserve (formerly known as Berwick Recreation Reserve or Manuka Road Oval) is a multi-sports complex located in the Melbourne suburb of Berwick. It includes an oval for Australian rules football and cricket, as well as netball courts and a running track.

The venue is named after Edwin Flack, Australia's first Olympian. It is the home of the Berwick Football Club, which has competed in the Eastern Football Netball League (EFNL) since 2020.

== History ==
The land known as "Berwick Recreation Reserve" was gazetted on 14 July 1863. There are records of the Berwick Football Club playing at a ground with that name as early as the 1930s. However, the club appears to have played approximately 2 kilometres (1.2 mi) away at Arch Brown Reserve.

When Berwick entered the Victorian Football Association in 1983, it continued to play at Arch Brown Reserve, although it had a long-term plan to move to Manuka Road Oval for the 1987 season. However, a fire destroyed the Arch Brown Reserve clubrooms in December 1984, and the club moved to Manuka Road in 1985 with the support of the local council. The first VFA match played at the venue was between Berwick and Caulfield on 21 April 1985 in front of a crowd of 1,500 people.

In 1996, the venue was renamed to Edwin Flack Reserve after Edwin Flack, Australia's first Olympian, who lived in Berwick.

During the 2025 federal election campaign, the Labor Party committed to A$1.5 million in funding to upgrade the venue's facilities.
