= 2020 VFL season =

Cancelled 139th season of the Victorian Football League

- Premiers: Premiership not contested

The 2020 VFL season was meant to have been the 139th season of the Victorian Football League (VFL), a second-tier Australian rules football competition played in the state of Victoria. However, the season was cancelled due to the COVID-19 pandemic.

== Clubs ==
=== Venues and affiliations ===
Club	Home venue(s)	Capacity	AFL affiliation
Box Hill	Box Hill City Oval	10,000	Hawthorn
Box Hill	Marvel Stadium	53,343	Hawthorn
Casey	Casey Fields	9,000	Melbourne
Coburg	Avalon Airport Oval	8,000	—N/a
Coburg	Highgate Recreation Reserve	5,000	—N/a
Coburg	Mars Stadium	11,000	—N/a
Coburg	MacPherson Park		—N/a
Coburg	Preston City Oval	5,000	—N/a
Collingwood	Victoria Park	10,000	Collingwood
Collingwood	Holden Centre	3,500	Collingwood
Collingwood	Marvel Stadium	53,343	Collingwood
Essendon	Windy Hill	10,000	Essendon
Essendon	Melbourne Cricket Ground	100,024	Essendon
Footscray	VU Whitten Oval	10,000	Western Bulldogs
Footscray	Marvel Stadium	53,343	Western Bulldogs
Frankston	SkyBus Stadium	5,000	—N/a
Geelong	GMHBA Stadium	36,000	Geelong
Geelong	Melbourne Cricket Ground	100,024	Geelong
North Melbourne	Arden Street Oval	4,000	North Melbourne
North Melbourne	Marvel Stadium	53,343	North Melbourne
Northern Blues	IKON Park	24,500	Carlton
Northern Blues	Preston City Oval	5,000	Carlton
Port Melbourne	ETU Stadium	6,000	—N/a
Richmond	Swinburne Centre	2,800	Richmond
Richmond	Holm Park	7,000	Richmond
Richmond	Melbourne Cricket Ground	100,024	Richmond
Sandringham	RSEA Park	8,000	St Kilda
Sandringham	WS Trevor Barker Beach Oval	6,000	St Kilda
Sandringham	Marvel Stadium	53,343	St Kilda
Werribee	Avalon Airport Oval	8,000	—N/a
Williamstown	Downer Oval	6,000	—N/a

=== Coach appointments ===
New coach	Club	Date of appointment	Previous coach	Ref
Ben McGlynn	Sandringham	13 September 2019	Aaron Hamill	
Mark Corrigan	Essendon	19 November 2019	Dan Jordan	
Xavier Clarke	Richmond	7 November 2019	Craig McRae	
Adrian Connolly	Sandringham	24 June 2020	Ben McGlynn	

=== Club leadership ===
Club	Coach	Leadership group			Ref
Club	Coach	Captain(s)	Vice-captain(s)	Other leader(s)	Ref
Box Hill	Max Bailey	Damian Mascitti			
Casey	Sam Radford	Mitch White			
Coburg	Andrew Sturgess	Peter McEvoy, Ryan Exon	Jesse Corigliano	Sam Lowson, Luke Bunker, Mitch Podhajski, Tom Silvestro, Jacob Ballard	
Collingwood	Garry Hocking	Jack Hellier		Matt Smith, Callan Wellings, Lachlan Tardrew, Campbell Hustwaite	
Essendon	Mark Corrigan	Aaron Heppell			
Footscray	Daniel Giansiracusa	Josh Prudden	Anthony Scott		
Frankston	Danny Ryan	Josh Newman			
Geelong	Shane O'Bree	Aaron Black		Callum Mitchell, Dan Capiron, Teia Miles	
Northern Blues	Josh Fraser	Tom Wilson			
North Melbourne	David Loader				
Port Melbourne	Gary Ayres	Jordan Lisle, Tom O'Sullivan		Eli Templeton, Mack Rivett, Anthony Anastasio, Harvey Hooper	
Richmond	Xavier Clarke	Steve Morris		Daniel Coffield, Hugh Beasley, Brenton Credlin	
Sandringham	Ben McGlynn	Brede Seccull			
Sandringham	Adrian Connolly	Brede Seccull			
Williamstown	Andy Collins				
Werribee	Mark Williams	Michael Sodomaco			

== Impact of the COVID-19 pandemic ==
=== Season suspension ===
Preparations for the 2020 season featured all fifteen clubs from 2019. The fixture was released on 18 December 2019, with Collingwood scheduled to play Box Hill on 3 April in the season opener as part of an 18-match home-and-away season over 21 rounds, followed by a four-week finals series ending on 20 September. Pre-season practice matches took place in February and early March.

The season was disrupted by the COVID-19 pandemic, which was formally declared a pandemic on 11 March 2020, three weeks prior to round 1. Governmental restrictions on non-essential public gatherings during the pandemic meant that, as a minimum, matches would need to be played before empty stadiums, as was planned for the Australian Football League (AFL).

However, AFL clubs with VFL reserves teams or affiliates had separate concerns that their players could be exposed to the virus when playing in the VFL, as the state league would not be able to offer the same level of medical and quarantine protections that the fully professional league could.

AFL clubs began to withdraw their AFL-listed players from their VFL preseason programs, before the start of the VFL season was suspended indefinitely on 16 March. The AFL season was suspended shortly afterwards, and state government lockdowns precluded any state football being played.

=== Carlton ends affiliation ===
On 26 March 2020, Carlton ended its reserves affiliation with the Northern Blues. Carlton had been investing significant money in the VFL club and in developing it as a pathway to senior football, but the financial impact of the pandemic forced Carlton to make significant cuts to its expenses, and ending its affiliation was one of these cuts.

By this stage, the Northern Blues were reliant on Carlton for its financial viability, and as a result the club temporarily dropped out of the league after 101 years of membership. Carlton adopted a lower-cost strategy by fielding its own standalone reserves team when AFL players were next released to play in the VFL in 2021.

The Northern Blues initially announced that it would fold, but the club regrouped throughout the year and returned to VFL (under its previous name of the Northern Bullants) for the 2021 season.

=== Planned return and cancellation ===
After months of uncertainty, and as lockdowns were being lifted, it was agreed on 16 June to play a shortened VFL season without any AFL-listed players, with training to start from 13 July and the season to begin on 1 August.

Significantly, however, all AFL clubs were required to continue to keep AFL-listed players away from the state league systems for the entire season, in order to better control their quarantine environments and avoid risk to the AFL season. This meant that AFL reserves teams were unable to contest the restarted season, and the three remaining clubs with reserves affiliations – Box Hill, Casey and Sandringham – would need to temporarily play as standalone senior clubs for the first time in two decades. These clubs were allowed to top up their playing lists, including getting first selection of any VFL-listed players from the AFL clubs' reserves teams who were seeking new teams for the season. Sandringham coach Ben McGlynn was retained by St Kilda as part of its AFL staff, leaving Sandringham to replace him with Adrian Connolly for the remainder of the 2020 season.

This, coupled with the Northern Blues expected to fold and in no position to field a team, initially left only eight clubs to contest the shortened season. However, on 3 July, Casey announced its withdrawal from the season as well. Although the club had been preparing for the season and signing players to bolster its list, it opted to withdraw citing concern about health risks amid an ongoing rise in Victorian cases at the time. The club was also dealing with the fact that it was not able to use Casey Fields, as it was normally shared with the AFL's Melbourne Football Club as a training venue, and quarantine segregations were required between VFL and AFL systems.

Preparations continued, but on 7 July – the same date that the new fixture was released to clubs – the second wave of COVID-19 cases across Melbourne resulted in a new lockdown being imposed by the state government, which all but precluded organised sport in the state until at least 19 August (ultimately lasting several months beyond that). The following day, the decision was made to cancel the VFL season outright. It was the first senior VFA/VFL season to be cancelled since 1944, when the VFA was suffering from a financial crisis that was exacerbated by Australia's participation in World War II.

== Season notes ==
- Coburg's normal home venue, Piranha Park, was under a planned redevelopment during 2020. Under the original fixture prior to the suspension, most of the club's home games were scheduled at Highgate Recreation Reserve in Craigieburn, with one-off home games scheduled for Preston City Oval, Avalon Airport Oval, Mars Stadium, and Melton's MacPherson Park.
- Richmond was scheduled to play two home matches at Holm Park Recreation Reserve in Beaconsfield.

== See also ==
- 2020 VFL Women's season
