= Aubrey Neal =

Australian rules footballer

Personal information
- Full name: Aubrey Gordon Neal
- Born: 31 July 1893; Collingwood, Victoria
- Died: 26 September 1951 (aged 58); Heidelberg, Victoria
- Original team: Ringwood

Playing career^{1}
Years	Club	Games (Goals)
1920	Melbourne	1 (0)
- ^{1} Playing statistics correct to the end of 1920.

Aubrey Gordon Neal (31 July 1893 – 26 September 1951) was an Australian rules footballer who played for the Melbourne Football Club in the Victorian Football League (VFL).
