= Mulgrave Football Club =

Sports team

Mulgrave
- Full name: Mulgrave Football Club
- Nickname: Lions
- Founded: 1925
- League: Eastern Football League
- Home ground: Mulgrave Reserve, Garnett Road, Wheelers Hill

Strip
- Red, royal blue and yellow

Mulgrave Football Club is an Australian rules football and netball club based in the Melbourne suburb of Wheelers Hill in Victoria, Australia. The club is a founding member of the Eastern Football League, with the men's football teams currently competing in Division Two.

== History ==
The club was formed in 1925 and entered the Berwick District Football Association. In their third season as a club they won the 1927 premiership of that completion.

In 1930 they were minor premiers but lost the grand final later in the same year. The effects of the depression soon hit the club as their performances saw them slip down the ladder to become last in 1935. The club went in recess at the end of 1935 and didn't reform until after the WWII in 1948. They commenced in Dandenong DFL B grade competition and stayed there until 1953.

In 1954 the club transferred to the Croydon-Ferntree Gully FL “B” grade competition because the Dandenong District competition had closed down. Their time in ‘B’ grade was successful, winning the flag in 1954, 1956 and 1960.

After two straight Grand Final loses (2008 and 2009) the club won the 2010 EFL Division 2 Grand final defeating Bayswater at Tormore Reserve, Boronia. The team was coached by Hayden Stanton and Captained by Brad Fowler. The premiership win broke a 31-year drought at the Lions and represented the club's first senior premiership since 1979.

They were a founding club for the Eastern District Football League in 1962. Most of their time has been spend in 2nd division.

== AFL Players ==
- Barry Mitchell – Sydney, Carlton
- Adrian Deluca – Carlton
- Shane Biggs – Western Bulldogs
- Ryan Lester – Brisbane Lions
- Lin Jong – Western Bulldogs
