= Wheelers Hill =

- Suburb
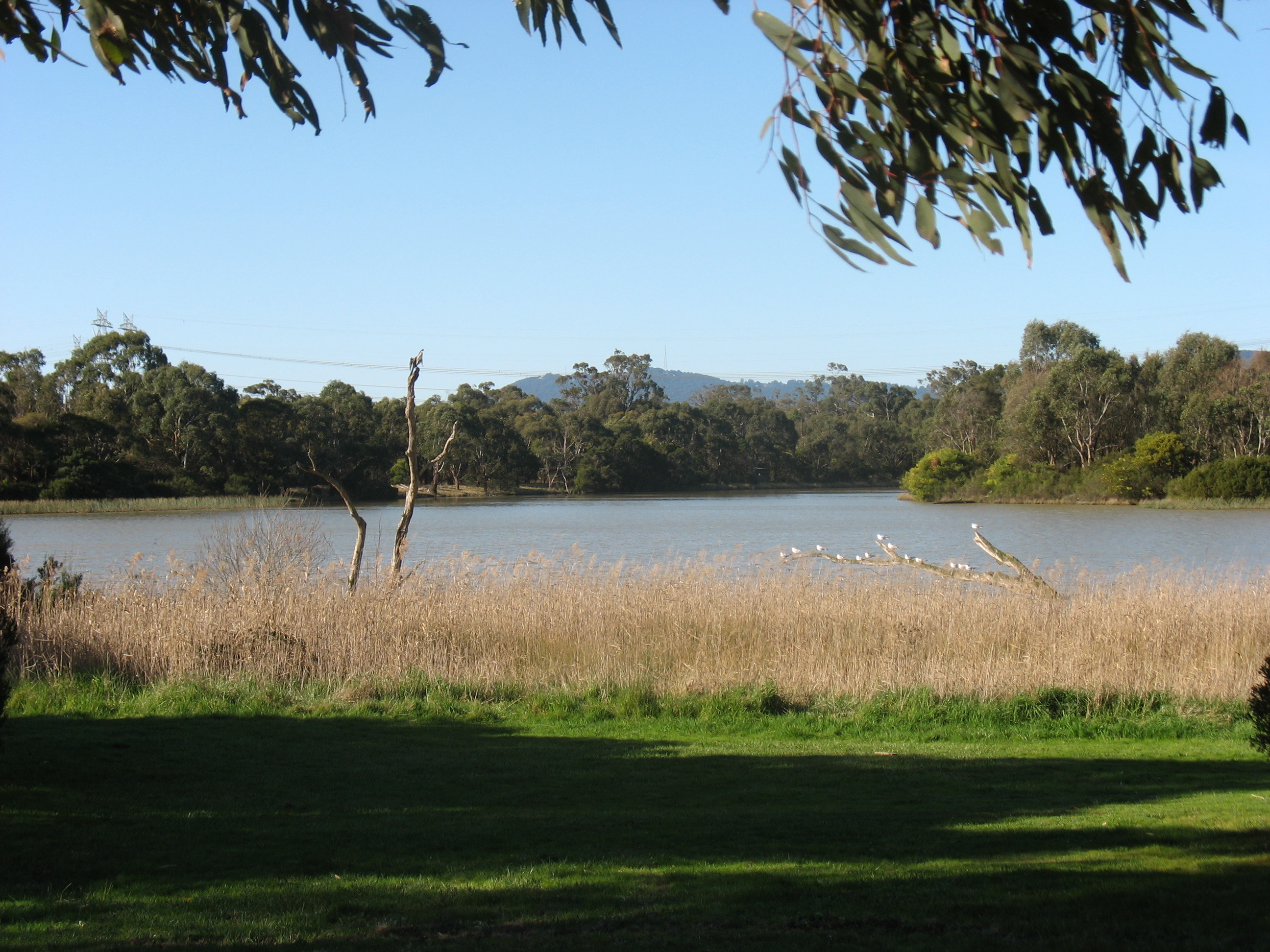
- Jells Park in Wheelers Hill

- Interactive map of Wheelers Hill
- Coordinates: 37.899°S 145.183°E
- Country: Australia
- State: Victoria
- City: Melbourne
- LGA: City of Monash
- Location: 23 km (14 mi) from Melbourne

Government
  - State electorates: Glen Waverley; Mulgrave
  - Federal divisions: Chisholm; Hotham

Area
  - Total: 10.3 km^{2} (4.0 sq mi)

Population
  - Total: 20,652 (2021 census)
  - Density: 2,005/km^{2} (5,193/sq mi)
- Postcode: 3150
Suburbs around Wheelers Hill
Mount Waverley	Glen Waverley	Scoresby
Notting Hill	Wheelers Hill	Scoresby
Mulgrave	Mulgrave	Rowville

Wheelers Hill is a suburb of Melbourne, Victoria, Australia, 23 km south-east of Melbourne's Central Business District, located within the City of Monash local government area. Wheelers Hill recorded a population of 20,652 at the 2021 census.

At 152m above sea level it includes one of the highest points in metropolitan Melbourne.

== History ==
Wheelers Hill was named after James Wheeler in 1888, who was an early settler in the Dandenong area.

The Wheelers Hill Hotel was a post office and stopping point for farmers before a 6 to 8-hour drive to the city by horse to sell their goods. The Wheelers Mansion was destroyed by a fire in the late 1920s. The house was located somewhere to the south of the Wheelers Hill Library. The Post Office opened on 1 January 1869 and was called Mulgrave until 1888.

== Sport ==
- Mulgrave Football Club at Mulgrave Reserve
- Eastern Devils Women's Football Club at Mulgrave Reserve

== Education ==
Secondary Schools

- Wheelers Hill Secondary College
- Brentwood Secondary College

Primary Schools

- Caulfield Grammar School
- Jells Park Primary

== Public library and art gallery ==
The Museum of Australian Photography and the Wheelers Hill branch of the Monash Public Library Service co-located in a building at the corner of Jells Road and Ferntree Gully Road, Wheelers Hill. The architect of the original 1990 Gallery was Harry Seidler. Even though Seidler had designed a further whole cultural precinct beyond the gallery,

== See also ==
- City of Waverley – Wheelers Hill was previously within this former local government area.
