= Fairpark Football Club =

Australian rules football team

- Full name: Fairpark Football Club
- Nickname: Lions
- Founded: 1969
- League: Eastern Football League
- Home ground: Fairpark Reserve, Ferntree Gully

Strip
- Red, Royal Blue with yellow monogram

Fairpark Football Club, nicknamed the Lions, is an Australian rules football team. It is based in the eastern suburbs of Melbourne, Victoria, Australia and is part of the Eastern Football League.The club includes Senior, Reserve, and Under 18s teams, as well as a large number of youth teams that joined the Senior Club in 1997.

The clubrooms are located in Fairpark Reserve in Ferntree Gully, near the intersections of Park Boulevard and Manuka Drive, while the juniors are located at Lewis Road Reserve in Boronia.

The club has reaped the advantages of its administrators' hard work, with memberships increasing in recent decades and this trend set to continue. The club concentrates on great junior development in the hopes of keeping youngsters off the streets and building their teamwork, social skills, and football skills, which will help them grow into excellent community-minded individuals in the future.

On the other end of the spectrum, we have a Veterans squad (over 35s) and have added a second Veterans squad (over 40s) in recent seasons. We always welcome new players and fans.

The team opted to restore to its previous name, the Fairpark Lions, after the 2015 season.

== History ==
Founded in 1969 as an outlet for boys to develop their football skills, the club had grown to be able to field a senior side in 1978. Three seasons in the Yarra Valley Mountain FL second division from 1978 to 1980, the club then transferred to the Eastern District Football League in 1981.

In 1997 the club decided to change its name to Eastern Lions Football club in the hope of wider community appeal. At the end of 2016, the club voted to change its name back to Fairpark Football Club. In recent times the club has experienced a downfall in junior numbers. Despite this in 2017 they experienced a resurgence boasting four junior teams with numbers looking to grow in coming years.

In 2019 the senior team won their second premiership defeating East Burwood in a close match, with Ronnie McKendry winning the best on ground medal
