= The Basin Football Club =

Australian Football Club

The Basin
- Full name: The Basin Football Club
- Nickname: Bears
- Founded: 1947
- League: Eastern Football League
- Home ground: Batterham Reserve

The Basin Football Club is an Australian rules football club located in The Basin, Victoria. The club is affiliated in Division 2 of the Eastern Football League. The Basin Football Club has a tradition of local support and continues to be a powerhouse in Eastern Football League.

== History ==
The club was formed in 1947 and in 1948 combined with the Colchester-Basin Cricket Club and commenced playing at Batterham Reserve. They played in the Croydon FL and later became a founding member of the Eastern Football League.

== Senior Premierships ==
1962, 1985, 1994, 2012

== VFL/AFL players ==
- Angelo Petraglia - North Melbourne, Western Bulldogs
- John Holt - North Melbourne
- Jason Daniltchenko - North Melbourne
- Liam Shiels - Hawthorn
