= North Ringwood Football Club =

Australian rules football club in Victoria

Names
- Full name: North Ringwood Football Club Inc.
- Nickname(s): Saints, Sainters
- Club song: "Oh When The Saints"

2024 season
- Home-and-away season: 7th (Division 1)
- Leading goalkicker: Luke Patterson (31)
- Badrock Family Trophy: Aaron Fenton

Club details
- Founded: 1962; 64 years ago
- Colours: Red White Black
- Competition: Eastern Football Netball League
- President: Dean Philpots
- Coach: Matt Price
- Captain: Aaron Fenton
- Premierships: EFNL (5): 1978, 1989, 1999, 2012, 2014
- Grounds: Quambee Reserve
- North Ringwood Reserve

Uniforms
Home	Away

Other information
- Official website: nthringwoodfc.com.au

The North Ringwood Football Club is an Australian rules football club located in North Ringwood, Victoria. They play in Division 1 of the Eastern Football League.

== History ==
The Ringwood Catholic Rovers Football Club was founded in 1962. The club was a founding club of Eastern District Football League.

In December 1964 the club change its name to Ringwood Rovers Football Club then again in September 1966 to North Ringwood Football Club.

== Club Song ==
Sung to the tune of When The Saints Go Marching In

Oh, when the Saints go marching in,
Oh, when the Saints go marching in,
I want to be in that number,
When the Saints go marching in.

== VFL/AFL players ==
- Terry Cahill – Essendon
- Kevin Walsh – Essendon
- Dean Bailey – Essendon
- Peter Banfield – Essendon, Brisbane Bears
- Gary O’Donnell – Essendon
- Paul Salmon – Essendon, Hawthorn
- Tim Livingstone – Richmond
- Matthew Allan – Carlton, Essendon
- Nick Malceski – Sydney, Gold Coast
- David Wirrpanda – West Coast
- Aiden Begg - Collingwood
