= Norwood Football Club (Victoria) =

Australian rules football club located in North Ringwood, Victoria

Names
- Nickname(s): The Norsemen

Club details
- Founded: 1960
- Colours: Black, Purple, Gold, White
- Competition: Eastern Football League
- Ground(s): Mullum Mullum Reserve

The Norwood Football Club is an Australian rules football club located in North Ringwood, Victoria. They play in Division 1 of the Eastern Football League.

== History ==
The Norwood Football Club was founded in 1960 by David Jamieson, a teacher at the local Norwood High School. He recognised the need for a club to cater for the expanding number of juniors wanting to learn to play football in the North Ringwood area. The club quickly expanded to field its first senior side in 1961 in the then Croydon-Ferntree Gully Football League.

The CFGFL became the Eastern District Football League and the club won third division premierships in 1982, 1989 and 2003. In 2007 the EFL expanded its first division by two clubs to twelve. Norwood was invited for promotion as they were runners-up in second division. They have competed in first division every year since 2007 and won the 2014 premiership.

== VFL/AFL players ==
- Tom Boyd - Greater Western Sydney, Western Bulldogs
- Sam Blease - Melbourne, Geelong
- Adam Cerra - Fremantle, Carlton
- Jordan Gysberts - Melbourne, North Melbourne
- Daniel Stewart - Port Adelaide
- Leigh Williams - Melbourne
- James Parsons - Geelong
- Taylin Duman - Fremantle
