= Mooroolbark Football Club =

Australian rules football club

Mooroolbark
- Full name: Mooroolbark Football Club
- Nickname: The Mustangs
- Sport: Australian rules football
- Founded: 1966

Strip
- Green with Yellow

The Mooroolbark Football Club is an Australian rules football club located in Mooroolbark, Victoria. They play in Division 2 of the Eastern Football Netball League.

== History ==
The club was founded in 1965, they have played their entire life in the Eastern Football League.

== Premierships ==
- 1988, 2009

== VFL/AFL players ==
- Sam Mitchell - Hawthorn
- Cameron Pedersen - North Melbourne, Melbourne
- Heath Hocking - Essendon
- Warren McKenzie (AFL :Carlton, Sydney Swans)
- Matthew Bishop-Melbourne/Port Adelaide
