= Montrose Football Club (EFL) =

Australian football team

Montrose
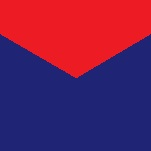
- Full name: Montrose Football Netball Club
- Nickname: Demons
- Founded: 1924
- League: Eastern Football League
- Home ground: Montrose Recreation Reserve
- Website: montrosefc.org.au

The Montrose Football Netball Club is an Australian rules football club located in Montrose, Victoria. They play in Division 1 of the Eastern Football League.

== History ==
The Montrose Football Club originally played in the Yarra Valley Football Association in 1922 and from 1924 to 1926. In 1923, Montrose merged with Kilsyth for one season only in the Yarra Valley Football Association.

The club appears to have been in recess between 1927 and 1938, then played in the Ringwood Football Association 1939 and 1940, before going into recess during World War Two.

Montrose played two seasons in the Croydon Mail Football League in 1946 and 1947, before going into recess.

The Montrose Football Club was reformed in 1964 and started in the Eastern Districts Football League - 2nd Division reserves. The following year the played seniors in 3rd Division. Initially the club struggled but in the late 1970s the club hit its stride and made the Grand Final in 1979 and winning it in 1981.

Promoted to 2nd division in 1982, the club was a strong performer playing in four Grand Finals before winning one in 1992.

A brief stint in 1st Division for 3 years before dropping back into 2nd Division until it won the premiership in 2013.

== Football timeline ==
- 1922: Yarra Valley Football Association
- 1923: Yarra Valley Football Association. Merged with Kilsyth FC in 1923.
- 1924–1926: Yarra Valley Football Association
- 1927–1938: Club in recess
- 1939: Ringwood Football Association Reserves
- 1940: Ringwood Football Association.
- 1941: In recess. Withdrew from the Ringwood Football Association.
- 1942–1945: Club in recess due to World War Two
- 1946–1947: Croydon Mail Football League
- 1947–1963: Club in recess
- 1964–2023: Eastern Football League

== Football Premierships ==
Seniors

- Eastern Football League
  - Division Three
    - 1981
- Eastern Football League
  - Division Two
    - 1992, 2013

=== Runners-up ===
- Yarra Valley Football Association
  - 1924
- Eastern Football League
  - Division Three
    - 1979
- Eastern Football League
  - Division Two
    - 1982, 1983, 1989, 1991, 1996, 2004, 2011, 2012
