= Templestowe Football Club =

Templestowe Football Club is an Australian rules football club located in the outer north eastern suburbs of Melbourne, Victoria. Currently affiliated with the Eastern Football League, Templestowe Football Club boasts a long and rich history.

== History ==
The club was founded in 1892 beginning its on-field performances under the name of the "All Blacks". The club's first home ground was Finns Reserve and Templestowe commenced in the Heidelberg District Football League. Back in those days, the club travelled far and wide to meet opponents.

In 1912, the club moved to Westerfolds Park (previously known as Smith's Paddock) and in the 1922 was a founding member of the Diamond Valley Football League. After a stint playing at the Fitzsimons' property, the club moved to its current location at Porter Street Reserve in the early 1930s, at the same time adopting the famous maroon and white colours. Templestowe left the DVFL in the early 1950s to try their luck in the East Suburban Football League.

In the early sixties Templestowe returned to the DVFL and in 1968 won their first premiership, with the second quickly following in 1973. Templestowe continued in the DVFL with mixed results until 1990 when the club's future was in grave doubt as it battled for survival both on and off the field. At the Annual General Meeting that year it was decided that the club should move in a new direction and the Eastern Districts Football League (now known as Eastern Football League) became home with the club being accepted into the third division. The Reserves won their first ever flag in 1992, while the Seniors came perilously close during the mid-1990s, being runner up 1994, 1995 and 1996. Finally, in 1997, the Templestowe Football Club achieved the ultimate goal and won both the Senior and Reserve premierships.

Templestowe's first venture into the strong second division in 1998 was a huge disappointment with a return to third division in the following season being the result. During 1999, the club underwent many changes, the most notable of which was adopting a new jumper, in the colours teal, black and white. In this same year, Templestowe lost in the preliminary final, followed by a heartbreaking two point defeat in the 2000 Grand Final.

A number of years ago, the executive of Templestowe Football Club determined that the future of the club could only be assured by the influx of younger players through an Under 18 competition. While the club had previously had Under 18s teams, these boys tended to come from diverse sources rather than through a linked junior competition. For the club to establish its own junior football club would have had high risk not to mention high expense.

Almost at the same time, Doncaster Heights Junior Football Club executive were being challenged by the parents of their older boys (Colts) to establish linkages with senior clubs so that natural progression in their football careers could occur.

At the other end of the scale, Templestowe Park Primary School Auskick were looking for a junior football club for their youngsters that would encourage fair play and had a strong family orientation. It was from these linkages that Templestowe embarked on a new phase of its history in establishing a pathway program that linked three independent clubs that will ensure that kids and young adults have a lifelong relationship to football. In 2005, the club established linkages with Fremantle Football Club and as a result, made a historic decision to change colours to the away strip of the AFL club.

== Premierships ==
=== Seniors ===
1968 (Diamond Valley Football League)

1973 (Diamond Valley Football League)

1997 (Eastern Football League) - 3rd Division

2010 (Eastern Football League) - 4th Division

=== Reserves ===
1992 & 1997 & 2016 (Eastern Football League)

=== Under 19's ===
2012 (Eastern Football League) - 3rd Division
