= East Ringwood Football Club =

Names
- Nickname: The Mighty Roos

Club details
- Founded: 1929
- Colours
- Competition: Eastern Football League
- Coach: Paul Griffiths
- Captain(s): James Belo & Damon Delaney
- Ground: East Ringwood Reserve

The East Ringwood Football Club is an Australian rules football club located in Ringwood, Victoria. The club is affiliated in the Premier Division of the Eastern Football League.

== History ==
Club was formed in 1929 and played in the Ringwood District Football Association until WWII. After the war it played in the Croydon FL and later was founding member of the Eastern Football League.

== Club Song ==
Sung to the tune of Notre Dame Victory March

Cheer, cheer the blue and the white,
Honour thy name by day and by night,
Lift that noble banner high,
Shake down the thunder from the sky,
Whether the odds be great or small,
Roos will go in and win overall,
While their loyal sons are marching,
Onwards to victory!

== Premierships ==
- 1941, 1947, 1953, 1954, 1957, 1961, 1966, 1974, 1984, 2002, 2022

== VFL/AFL players ==
- Shane Biggs - Western Bulldogs
- Daniel McStay - Brisbane Lions/Collingwood
- Leigh Osborne - Gold Coast
- Jess Sinclair - North Melbourne
- Nick Watson - Hawthorn
- Mark Attard - North Melbourne
- Judson Clarke - Richmond
- Kane Fraser - Hawthorn
- Heath Hocking - Essendon
- Wil Parker - Collingwood
- Xavier Taylor - Melbourne
- Graeme Austin - Prahran/Western Bulldogs
