= Ringwood Football Club =

Australian rules football team

Ringwood
- Full name: Ringwood Football & Netball Club
- Nickname: Redbacks
- Founded: 1899
- League: Eastern Football League
- Home ground: Jubilee Park, Ringwood

Strip
- Black with white yoke

Ringwood Football Club, nicknamed the Redbacks, is an Australian rules football team. It is based in the eastern suburbs of Melbourne, Victoria, Australia and is part of the Eastern Football League.

== History ==
Although football had been played in the district since the early 1890s, the club wasn't founded until 1899. Since its founding the club has always been involve in the local suburban competition in its area. From the Reporter League to the Ringwood District competition followed by the Croydon-Ferntree Gully FL and now the Eastern FL. The Ringwood Football Club was originally based at East Ringwood Reserve before relocating to Ringwood Reserve in 1930. In 1959, the Club relocated to Jubilee Park.

Ringwood Football Club had commenced by at least 1882

It became one of the founding clubs of the Eastern District Football League in 1962.

== Premierships ==
- 1923, 1924, 1932, 1934, 1948, 1955, 1956, 1957, 1959, 1962, 1972, 1976, 1978, 2005

== VFL/AFL players ==
- Aubrey Neal - Melbourne
- Enos Thomas - Melbourne, Essendon
- Joshua Croft - Footscray
- Tom McCaffrey - Fitzroy
- Stan Ogden - Richmond, Hawthorn
- Gordon Lindsay - Melbourne
- Jim Ross - St Kilda
- Jim Morgan - Hawthorn
- Stan Beal - Footscray
- Frank Slater - Richmond
- Robin Close - Essendon
- John Carpenter - Essendon
- Neil Clarke - Essendon
- Paul Van Der Haar - Essendon
- Paul Considine - Hawthorn
- Enrico Misso - St Kilda
- Geoff Parker - Essendon
- Haydn Robins - Melbourne, Richmond
- Kane Johnson - Adelaide, Richmond
- Matthew Banks - Essendon
- Mark Bolton - Essendon
