= Berwick Football Club =

Names
- Full name: Berwick Football Club
- Nickname: Wickers

Club details
- Founded: 1880s; 145 years ago
- Colours
- Competition: Eastern Football Netball League
- Ground: Edwin Flack Reserve

Uniforms
| Home | Away |

Other information
- Official website: berwickfc.com.au

The Berwick Football Club, nicknamed the Wickers, is an Australian rules football club based in the Melbourne suburb of Berwick. It has played its home matches at Edwin Flack Reserve since 1985.

Founded in the 1880s, Berwick initially competed in several local competitions before transferring to the South West Gippsland Football League (SWGFL) in 1954. During the 1970s and 1980s, it contested eleven consecutive finals series and won two premierships. The club had a five-year stint in the Victorian Football Association (VFA) between 1983 and 1987, but was never promoted from Division 2.

After leaving the VFA, Berwick rejoined the SWGFL until the league was absorbed by the Mornington Peninsula Nepean Football League (MPNFL). It was a founding member of the short-lived breakaway South East Football Netball League (SEFNL), winning three senior premierships and appearing in all four senior grand finals.

Since 2020, Berwick has competed in the Eastern Football Netball League (EFNL), where it is the south-easternmost member. As of 2026, the club plays in Premier Division of the men's competition and Division 3 of the women's competition.

== History ==
A football match was recorded having been played in 1879 by the 'Berwick (combined)' club with Dandenong. Two weeks later another match was played by a 'combined team from Berwick and Pakenham'. In 1880 a team is recorded as the 'Berwick and Harkaway United club'. The club, then recorded as Berwick from 1881, is shown to have played annual matches against Dandenong through the 1880s. Its first known premiership success came in the Berwick District Football Association in 1910, and it won one more premiership in its time in that competition, in 1925. The club later competed in the Dandenong District Football Association. It then joined the South West Gippsland Football League in 1954, winning the premiership in its first season. It became one of the SWGFL's most powerful clubs during the 1970s, and by 1982 it had contested eleven consecutive finals series and won two more premierships – back-to-back in 1977 and 1978.

On 19 November 1982 Berwick was admitted to the Victorian Football Association's second division for the 1983 season, as part of the VFA's restructuring and expansion in the early 1980s. The SWGFL did not want to lose Berwick, and it refused to endorse clearances for its players to the VFA; but Berwick went to the Supreme Court of Victoria, which, in a decision which was finalised only four days prior to the start of the season, found that clearances were not legally required in a case where a club switched leagues. The club spent five seasons in the VFA, without achieving any significant success, its best result a seventh placing out of eleven in 1984 with a 7–9 record from sixteen games played. The club struggled to recruit local players, in large part because the players preferred to play SWGFL games on Saturdays than VFA games on Sundays; and it found that its VFA attendances were no larger than its SWGFL crowds had been. The club elected to leave the VFA after the 1987 season, and returned to the SWGFL in 1988.

Over the following 25 years, the club contested the different variations of the local competition. This was initially the SWGFL from 1988 until 1994; the league was absorbed by the Mornington Peninsula Nepean Football League, becoming the Casey-Cardinia Division, in 1995, and the club won one premiership in that competition, in 1999. In 2015, the clubs from the Casey-Cardinia Division left to found the South East FL; Berwick won the new league's inaugural senior premiership in 2015, as well as the premierships in all four football grades (senior, reserves, under-19s and under-18s) that season, and won further senior premierships in 2017 and 2018. In 2019, the league merged with AFL Yarra Ranges to become AFL Outer East, in which Berwick contested one season.

In 2020, Berwick departed the country competition and joined the metropolitan Eastern Football League, becoming its south-easternmost member, initially joining an expanded Premier Division. Its inaugural season was cancelled due to the COVID-19 pandemic, meaning 2021 was its first season of competition.

== Club symbols ==
The club wears a navy blue guernsey with a white monogram, and is known by the nickname 'Wickers. While in the VFA, the club reversed its design to a white guernsey with navy blue monogram, and later a white guernsey with navy blue hoops near the waist and gold trimmings, due to a VFA requirement that its clubs not wear the same guernseys as Victorian Football League clubs (Berwick's design was the same as Carlton's, except with a different monogram).

Until 1984, the club played its games at the Arch Brown Reserve in Buchanan Rd. After a fire destroyed the pavilion in December 1984, the club moved to the newer Edwin Flack Reserve in Manuka Rd, where it remains today.

== Premierships ==
- 1910, 1925, 1954, 1977, 1978, 1999, 2015, 2017, 2018

== Club VFA records ==
| Highest Score | 31.23 (209) v Sunshine, Round 12, 1984, Skinner Reserve |
| Lowest Score | 2.2 (14) v Box Hill, Round 14, 1986, Box Hill City Oval |
| Greatest Winning Margin | 123 points v Sunshine, Round 1, 1984, Arch Brown Reserve |
| Greatest Losing Margin | 222 points v Box Hill, Round 14, 1986, Box Hill City Oval |
| Lowest Winning Score | 13.7 (85) v Kilsyth 8.13 (61), Round 7, 1983, Arch Brown Reserve |
| Highest Losing Score | 20.6 (126) v Box Hill 23.11 (149), Round 8, 1984, Box Hill City Oval |
