= Eastern Football Netball League =

Australian rules football league

- Most recent season or competition: 2024 EFNL season
- be
- Formerly: Eastern Districts Football League (1962-1997); Eastern Football League (1998-2019)
- Sport: Australian rules football
- Founded: 1962; 64 years ago
- Owner: Lyle Anderson
- CEO: Jy Bond
- No. of teams: 54: 49 (men's); 34 (women's); 4 (juniors only)
- Website: efnl.org.au

The Eastern Football Netball League (EFNL), formerly known as the Eastern Districts Football League (EDFL) and later the Eastern Football League (EFL), is an Australian rules football and netball league based in the eastern suburbs of metropolitan Melbourne.

== History ==
The Eastern Districts Football League was established on 15 February 1962, but its origins can be traced back to the Reporter District Football League established in 1903, with the following clubs - Bayswater, Box Hill, Canterbury, Ferntree Gully, Mitcham and Ringwood.

The following football associations all played their part in the now Eastern Football Netball League:

- The Ringwood District Football Association was established in 1922 and consisted of the following clubs - Croydon, Ferntree Gully, Kilsyth-Monbulk, Ringwood B and Warrandyte.
- The Croydon Mail Football League was established in 1945 and consisted of the following clubs - Bayswater, Boronia, Croydon and Kilsyth. It appears that the League's name was changed to the Croydon District Football League in 1948 and stayed this way in 1949 too.
- In 1950 the league became known as the Croydon-Ferntree Gully Football League, when Ferntree Gully left the Dandenong & District Football League and three grades of football commenced in 1950.
- In 1997, the Eastern Districts Football League and the Knox Junior Football Association amalgamated to form the renamed Eastern Football League.

Following a restructure after the 2018 season, the league consisted of five divisions - Premier and Division 1 had ten clubs each, Division 2 and 3 had eight clubs, and Division 4 had nine with the admission of Croydon North-MLOC for 2019.

After the conclusion of the 2019 season, on 15 October, the league announced a re-branding to the Eastern Football Netball League, recognising netball as a key part of the league structure.

On 3 June 2020, the EFNL cancelled its 2020 season due to the COVID-19 pandemic.

With the admission of Bulleen Templestowe for 2025, there are now 54 clubs in the league.

=== Jingle ===
The EFL had its own jingle that was used for the 2000 season.

Number one, you can tell
It's the EFL, the EFL
And they do it so well
In the EFL, the EFL

Number one, you can tell
It's the EFL, the EFL
And they do it so well
In the EFL, the EFL

Number one, you can tell
It's the EFL, the EFL!

== Clubs ==
=== Locations ===
Locations of the 2026 EFNL clubs. Red indicates Premier Division clubs, orange indicates Division 1 clubs, yellow indicates Division 2 clubs, green indicates Division 3 clubs, blue indicates Division 4 clubs, purple indicates clubs only fielding women's sides, cyan indicates clubs only fielding junior sides, and black indicates clubs in recess

=== Men ===
==== Premier Division (2027) ====
Club	Jumper	Nickname	Home Ground	Former League	Est.	Years in EFNL	EFNL Senior Premierships	
Club	Jumper	Nickname	Home Ground	Former League	Est.	Years in EFNL	Total	Most recent
Balwyn		Tigers	Balwyn Park, Balwyn	SFL	1909	2007-	7	2025
Berwick		Wickers	Edwin Flack Reserve, Berwick	OEFNL	1903	2021-	0	-
Blackburn		Panthers, Burners	Morton Park, Blackburn	CFGFL	1890	1962-	3	2002
Doncaster East (Beverley Hills 1982-89)		Lions	Zerbes Reserve, Doncaster East	VAFA	1972	1982-	4	2019
East Ringwood		Roos	East Ringwood Reserve, East Ringwood	CFGFL	1929	1962-	6	2026
North Ringwood		Saints	Quambee Reserve, Ringwood North	–	1962	1962-	6	2026
Rowville		Hawks	Seebeck Oval, Rowville	–	1964	1965-	6	2023
South Belgrave		Saints	Belgrave South Recreation Reserve, Belgrave South	YVMDFL	1946	1969, 2008-	4	2025
South Croydon		Bulldogs	Cheong Park, South Croydon	–	1969	1969-	8	2017
Vermont		Eagles	Vermont Recreation Reserve, Vermont	CFGFL	1919	1962-	21	2019

==== Division 1 (2027) ====
Club	Jumper	Nickname	Home Ground	Former League	Est.	Years in EFNL	EFNL Senior Premierships	
Club	Jumper	Nickname	Home Ground	Former League	Est.	Years in EFNL	Total	Most recent
Beaconsfield		Eagles	Holm Park, Beaconsfield	OEFNL	1890	2022-	0	-
Boronia		Hawks	Tormore Reserve, Boronia	CFGFL	1927	1962-	7	2024
Mitcham		Tigers	Walker Park, Mitcham	CFGFL	1888	1962-	9	2024
Montrose		Demons	Montrose Recreation Reserve, Montrose	CMFL	1924	1964-	3	2013
Mooroolbark		Mustangs	Mooroolbark Heights Reserve, Mooroolbark	–	1966	1966-	2	2009
Noble Park		Bulls	Pat Wright Senior Oval, Noble Park	SFL	1918	2000-	5	2022
Norwood		Norsemen	Mullum Mullum Reserve, Ringwood	–	1960	1962-	5	2014
Park Orchards		Sharks	Domeney Reserve, Park Orchards	–	1969	2012-	1	2017
Surrey Park		Panthers	Surrey Park Reserve, Box Hill	SFL	1994	2002-	3	2026
Wantirna South (South Wantirna 1962-97)		Devils	Walker Reserve, Wantirna South	MDFA	1952	1965-	6	2025

==== Division 2 (2027) ====
Club	Jumper	Nickname	Home Ground	Former League	Est.	Years in EFNL	EFNL Senior Premierships	
Club	Jumper	Nickname	Home Ground	Former League	Est.	Years in EFNL	Total	Most recent
Bayswater		Waters, Roos	Marie Wallace Bayswater Park, Bayswater	CFGFL	1895	1962-	7	2016
Croydon		Blues	Croydon Oval, Croydon	CFGFL	1906	1962-	2	1997
East Burwood		Rams	East Burwood Reserve, East Burwood	CFGFL	1910	1962-	12	2000
Heathmont		Jets	HE Parker Reserve, Heathmont	CFGFL	1956	1962-	4	2011
Lilydale		Falcons	Lilydale Recreation Reserve, Lilydale	YVFL	1872	1965-	6	2011
Mulgrave		Lions	Mulgrave Reserve, Wheelers Hill	CFGFL	1925	1962-	3	2010
Ringwood		Redbacks	Jubilee Park, Ringwood	CFGFL	1899	1962-	3	2005
Scoresby		Magpies	Scoresby Recreation Reserve, Scoresby	CFGFL	1925	1962-	8	2025
Templestowe		Dockers	Templestowe Reserve, Templestowe	DVFL	1892	1991-	2	2010
Waverley Blues		Blues	Mount Waverley Reserve, Mount Waverley	–	1998	1999-	4	2022

==== Division 3 (2027) ====
Club	Jumper	Nickname	Home Ground	Former League	Est.	Years in EFNL	EFNL Senior Premierships	
Club	Jumper	Nickname	Home Ground	Former League	Est.	Years in EFNL	Total	Most recent
Coldstream		Cougars	Halley Supple Reserve, Coldstream	CFGFL	1890	1962-	3	2001
Donvale		Magpies	Donvale Reserve, Donvale	ESCFA	1971	1992-2013, 2015-	7	2026
Ferntree Gully		Eagles	Wally Tew Reserve, Ferntree Gully	MDFA	1892	1965-	3	2016
Knox		Falcons	Knox Gardens Reserve, Wantirna South	ESCFA	1980	1989-	4	2017
Scoresby		Magpies	Scoresby Recreation Reserve, Scoresby	CFGFL	1925	1962-	8	2025
Silvan		Cats	Silvan Recreation Ground, Silvan	YVMDFL	1921	1962-1965, 2011-	2	2022
The Basin		Bears	Batterham Reserve, The Basin	CFGFL	1947	1962-	4	2012
Upper Ferntree Gully		Kings	Kings Park, Upper Ferntree Gully	MDFA	1948	1966-	5	2016
Whitehorse Pioneers		Pioneers	Springfield Park, Box Hill North	SFL	1954	1998-	3	2025
Warrandyte		Bloods	Warrandyte Reserve, Warrandyte	CFGFL	1906	1962-	7	2026

==== Division 4 (2027) ====
Club	Jumper	Nickname	Home Ground	Former League	Est.	Years in EFNL	EFNL Senior Premierships	
Club	Jumper	Nickname	Home Ground	Former League	Est.	Years in EFNL	Total	Most recent
Bulleen Templestowe		Bullants	Ted Ajani Reserve, Templestowe Lower	VAFA	1975	2025-	0	-
Chirnside Park		Panthers	Kimberley Reserve, Chirnside Park	VAFA	1978	2000-	1	2009
Croydon North MLOC		KangaRams	Hughes Park, Croydon North	–	2018	2019-	0	-
Doncaster		Sharks	Schramms Reserve, Doncaster	ESFL	1902	1962-2024, 2026-	7	2015
Fairpark (Eastern Lions 1997-2016)		Lions	Fairpark Reserve, Ferntree Gully	YVMDFL	1972	1981-	2	2019
Kilsyth		Cougars	Pinks Reserve, Kilsyth	CFGFL, VFA	1924	1962-1981, 1986-	3	1995
Old Yarra Cobras		Cobras	Koonung Reserve, Bulleen	VAFA	2022	2027-	0	-
Oakleigh Districts		Districts	Princes Highway Reserve, Oakleigh East	SFNL	1950	2022-	0	-
Nunawading*		Lions	Koonung Reserve, Blackburn North	ESFL	1927	1962-	1	2002

*For the 2026 season, Forest Hill's reserves will be replaced by Surrey Park's third side, while Nunawading's reserves will be replaced by Berwick's third side.

==== Men's clubs in recess (2026) ====
Club	Jumper	Nickname	Home Ground	Former League	Est.	Years in EFNL	EFNL Senior Premierships		Status
Club	Jumper	Nickname	Home Ground	Former League	Est.	Years in EFNL	Total	Most recent	Status
Glen Waverley Hawks		Hawks	Central Reserve, Glen Waverley	–	1973	2005-2022	0	-	Entered recess prior to 2023 season, still field netball teams

=== Women ===
==== Premier Division (2026) ====
Club	Jumper	Nickname	Home Ground	Former League	Est.	Years in EFNL	EFNL Senior Premierships	
Club	Jumper	Nickname	Home Ground	Former League	Est.	Years in EFNL	Total	Most recent
Boronia		Hawks	Tormore Reserve, Boronia	–	1927	2021-	1	2023
Eastern Devils		Devils	Mulgrave Reserve, Wheelers Hill	SEWF	1999	2022-	2	2023
North Ringwood		Saints	Quambee Reserve, Ringwood North	–	1962	2021-	2	2026*
Park Orchards		Sharks	Domeney Reserve, Park Orchards	–	1969	2021-	3	2026
South Belgrave		Saints	Belgrave South Recreation Reserve, Belgrave South	–	1946	2024-	0	–
South Croydon		Bulldogs	Cheong Park, South Croydon	–	1969	2021-	1	2024
Vermont		Eagles	Vermont Recreation Reserve, Vermont	–	1919	2021-	0	–
Whitehorse Pioneers		Pioneers	Springfield Park, Box Hill North	NFNL	1954	2021-	0	–

*not won in this division

==== Division 1 (2026) ====
Club	Jumper	Nickname	Home Ground	Former League	Est.	Years in EFNL	EFNL Senior Premierships	
Club	Jumper	Nickname	Home Ground	Former League	Est.	Years in EFNL	Total	Most recent
Balwyn		Tigers	Balwyn Park, Balwyn	–	1909	2025-	1	2026
East Ringwood		Roos	East Ringwood Reserve, East Ringwood	–	1929	2021-	1	2023
Knox		Falcons	Knox Gardens Reserve, Wantirna South	SEWF	1980	2021-	1	2022
Mooroolbark		Mustangs	Mooroolbark Heights Reserve, Mooroolbark	–	1966	2022-	3	2025
Surrey Park		Panthers	Surrey Park Reserve, Box Hill	–	1994	2021-	1	2024
The Basin		Bears	Batterham Reserve, The Basin	–	1947	2021-	0	–

==== Division 2 (2026) ====
Club	Jumper	Nickname	Home Ground	Former League	Est.	Years in EFNL	EFNL Senior Premierships	
Club	Jumper	Nickname	Home Ground	Former League	Est.	Years in EFNL	Total	Most recent
Beaconsfield		Eagles	Holm Park, Beaconsfield	SEWF	1890	2022-	0	–
Blackburn		Panthers	Morton Park, Blackburn	–	1890	2021-	0	–
Heathmont		Jets	HE Parker Reserve, Heathmont	–	1956	2021-	1	2025
Kilsyth		Cougars	Pinks Reserve, Kilsyth	–	1924	2021-	1	2023
Montrose		Demons	Montrose Recreation Reserve, Montrose	–	1924	2021-	1	2026
Park Orchards reserves		Sharks	Domeney Reserve, Park Orchards	–	1969	2026-	0	–
Rowville		Hawks	Seebeck Oval, Rowville	–	1964	2021-22; 2026-	0	–
Waverley Blues		Blues	Central Reserve, Glen Waverley	–	1998	2023-	0	–

==== Division 3 (2026) ====
Club	Jumper	Nickname	Home Ground	Former League	Est.	Years in EFNL	EFNL Senior Premierships	
Club	Jumper	Nickname	Home Ground	Former League	Est.	Years in EFNL	Total	Most recent
Berwick		Wickers	Edwin Flack Reserve, Berwick	VWFL	1903	2021, 2024-	0	–
Chirnside Park		Panthers	Kimberley Reserve, Chirnside Park	SEWF	1978	2021-	0	–
Coldstream		Cougars	Halley Supple Reserve, Coldstream	–	1890	2021-	0	–
Ferntree Gully		Eagles	Wally Tew Reserve, Ferntree Gully	–	1892	2021-22, 2024-	1	2024
Mitcham		Tigers	Walker Park, Mitcham	–	1888	2022-	0	–
North Ringwood reserves		Saints	Quambee Reserve, Ringwood North	–	1969	2024-	2	2026
South Croydon reserves		Bulldogs	Cheong Park, South Croydon	–	1969	2021-	0	–
Vermont reserves		Eagles	Vermont Recreation Reserve, Vermont	–	1919	2022-23, 2026-	1	2022

==== Division 4 (2026) ====
Club	Jumper	Nickname	Home Ground	Former League	Est.	Years in EFNL	EFNL Senior Premierships	
Club	Jumper	Nickname	Home Ground	Former League	Est.	Years in EFNL	Total	Most recent
Bayswater		Waters, Roos	Marie Wallace Bayswater Park, Bayswater	VWFL	1895	2024-	0	–
Boronia reserves		Hawks	Tormore Reserve, Boronia	–	1927	2021-	0	–
Eastern Devils reserves		Devils	Mulgrave Reserve, Wheelers Hill	SEWF	1999	2022-	0	–
Fairpark		Lions	Fairpark Reserve, Ferntree Gully	–	1969	2021-	0	–
Norwood		Norsemen	Mullum Mullum Reserve, Ringwood	–	1960	2025-	1	2025
Wantirna South		Devils	Walker Reserve, Wantirna South	–	1952	2023-	1	2026
Warrandyte		Bloods	Warrandyte Reserve, Warrandyte	–	1906	2023-	0	–

==== Division 5 (2026) ====
Club	Jumper	Nickname	Home Ground	Former League	Est.	Years in EFNL	EFNL Senior Premierships	
Club	Jumper	Nickname	Home Ground	Former League	Est.	Years in EFNL	Total	Most recent
Heathmont reserves		Jets	HE Parker Reserve, Heathmont	–	1956	2025-	0	–
Kilsyth reserves		Cougars	Pinks Reserve, Kilsyth	–	1924	2026-	0	–
North Ringwood reserves		Saints	Quambee Reserve, Ringwood North	–	1962	2024-	0	–
Nunawading		Lions	Koonung Reserve, Blackburn North	–	1927	2022-	0	–
Templestowe		Dockers	Templestowe Reserve, Templestowe	–	1892	2025-	0	–
The Basin reserves		Bears	Batterham Reserve, The Basin	–	1947	2022-	0	–
Upper Ferntree Gully		Kings	Kings Park, Upper Ferntree Gully	–	1948	2024-	1	2026
Wantirna South reserves		Devils	Walker Reserve, Wantirna South	–	1952	2026-	1	2026*

*not won in this division

==== In recess ====
Club	Jumper	Nickname	Home Ground	Former League	Est.	Years in EFNL	EFNL Senior Premierships	
Club	Jumper	Nickname	Home Ground	Former League	Est.	Years in EFNL	Total	Most recent
Donvale		Magpies	Donvale Reserve, Donvale	–	1971	2021-2025	0	–

=== Junior-only Clubs ===
Club	Jumper	Nickname	Home Ground	Former league	Est.	Years in EFNL	Senior affiliation
Endeavour Hills		Eagles	Singleton Reserve, Endeavour Hills	SEJ	1978	2021-	Endeavour Hills (SFNL)
Glen Waverley Rovers		Rovers	Brentwood Reserve, Glen Waverley	SECYCFA	1970		Mulgrave (EFNL)
Lysterfield		Wolves	Lakesfield Reserve, Lysterfield	–	2008	2011-	Scoresby (EFNL)
Rowville Knights (St Simons 1999-2015)		Knights	Liberty Avenue Reserve, Rowville	KJFA	1993	1999-	Scoresby (EFNL)

Senior clubs that field juniors in the EFL include:

- Bayswater
- Beaconsfield
- Blackburn
- Boronia
- Chirnside Park
- Coldstream
- Croydon
- Croydon North MLOC
- Donvale
- East Burwood
- East Ringwood
- Fairpark
- Ferntree Gully
- Heathmont
- Kilsyth
- Knox
- Lilydale
- Mitcham
- Montrose
- Mooroolbark
- Noble Parth
- North Ringwood
- Norwood
- Oakleigh District
- Ringwood
- Rowville
- Scoresby
- South Belgrave
- South Croydon
- Templestowe
- The Basin
- Upper Ferntree Gully
- Vermont
- Wantirna South
- Waverley Blues

== Premiers ==
=== Premiership Table (2025) ===
Club	Senior Men					Senior Women						Reserves					Under 19s				
Club	Premier (Div 1 1962–2018)	Div 1 (Div 2 1962–2018)	Div 2 (Div 3 1962–2018)	Div 3 (2019)	Div 4 (1986)	Premier (Div 1 2017–2018)	Div 1 (Div 2 2018)	Div 2 (North/ South/ Outer East 2019)	Div 3	Div 4	Div 5	Premier (Div 1 1962–2018)	Div 1 (Div 2 1962–2018)	Div 2 (Div 3 1962–2018)	Div 3 (2019)	Div 4 (1986)	Premier (Div 1 1980–2018)	Div 1 (Div 2 1980–2018)	Div 2 (Div 3 1980–2018)	Div 3 (Div 4 2003–2018)	Div 4 (2019)
Vermont	21	-	-	-	-	1	-	-	-	2	-	14	-	-	-	-	7	-	-	-	-
East Burwood	12	-	-	-	-	-	-	-	1	-	-	8	-	2	-	1	10	-	1	-	-
Balwyn	7	-	-	-	-	-	1	-	-	-	-	1	-	-	-	-	-	-	-	-	-
Mitcham	5	2	2	-	-	-	-	-	-	-	-	6	-	2	-	-	3	-	-	-	-
Noble Park	5	-	-	-	-	-	-	-	-	-	-	1	-	-	-	-	2	-	-	-	-
East Ringwood	4	2	-	-	-	-	-	1	-	-	-	15	-	1	-	-	6	1	-	-	-
Ringwood	2	2	-	-	-	-	-	-	-	-	-	-	1	-	-	-	2	-	3	-	-
Bayswater	1	5	1	-	-	1	-	-	-	-	-	-	2	-	-	-	-	-	-	-	-
Scoresby	1	5	-	1	1	-	-	-	-	-	-	2	1	-	-	2	4	-	-	-	-
South Croydon	1	4	3	-	-	1	1	-	-	-	-	-	2	1	-	-	1	-	2	-	-
Rowville	1	2	2	-	1	-	1	1	-	-	-	2	3	1	-	3	-	1	2	1	-
Donvale	1	2	1	3	1	-	1	-	-	-	-	-	2	-	4	-	-	1	-	2	-
East Hawthorn	1	1	-	-	-	-	-	-	-	-	-	1	1	-	-	-	-	-	-	-	-
Norwood	1	-	3	-	1	-	-	-	-	-	1	-	-	3	-	-	-	-	1	-	-
Doncaster	-	4	3	-	-	-	-	-	-	-	-	-	4	2	-	-	-	-	1	-	-
Lilydale	-	4	1	-	1	-	-	-	-	-	-	-	-	-	-	2	-	2	2	-	-
North Ringwood	-	5	1	-	-	-	1	1	1	-	-	1	2	1	-	-	-	7	3	-	-
Boronia	-	3	4	-	-	-	1	-	-	-	-	-	2	8	-	-	-	5	1	-	-
Blackburn	-	3	-	-	-	-	-	-	-	-	-	6	3	-	-	-	7	-	-	-	-
Wantirna South	-	2	2	-	1	-	-	-	-	1	-	-	2	1	-	2	-	1	1	-	-
Knox	-	2	1	-	1	-	-	1	-	-	-	2	1	4	-	-	1	4	1	2	-
Doncaster East	-	2	1	-	1	-	-	-	-	-	-	-	-	2	-	-	-	1	2	-	-
Mulgrave	-	2	1	-	-	-	-	-	-	-	-	-	8	2	-	-	-	5	-	-	-
Montrose	-	2	1	-	-	-	-	1	-	-	-	-	3	-	-	-	-	3	-	-	-
Surrey Hills	-	2	-	-	1	-	-	-	-	-	-	1	2	-	-	-	-	-	-	-	-
Croydon	-	2	-	-	-	-	-	-	-	-	-	1	3	-	-	-	1	4	1	-	-
Warrandyte	-	1	3	-	3	-	-	-	-	-	-	-	-	3	-	3	-	-	-	2	1
South Belgrave	-	1	1	1	1	-	-	-	-	-	-	-	1	-	1	-	-	-	-	1	-
Kilsyth	-	1	1	-	1	-	-	-	1	-	-	1	-	-	-	3	-	-	-	-	2
Ferntree Gully	-	1	1	-	1	-	-	-	-	1	-	-	4	-	-	1	-	-	-	3	-
Clayton	-	1	-	-	-	-	-	-	-	-	-	-	3	-	-	-	-	-	-	-	-
Upper Ferntree Gully	-	-	5	-	-	-	-	-	-	-	1	-	-	4	-	-	-	-	1	1	-
Olinda	-	-	4	-	-	-	-	-	-	-	-	-	-	-	-	-	-	-	-	-	-
Mount Evelyn	-	-	3	-	2	-	-	-	-	-	-	-	-	1	-	1	-	-	-	-	-
Coldstream	-	-	3	-	1	-	-	-	-	-	-	-	-	2	-	1	-	-	-	1	-
The Basin	-	-	3	-	1	-	-	-	-	-	-	-	-	1	-	2	-	-	3	1	-
Mooroolbark	-	-	2	-	-	-	-	1	1	1	-	-	1	1	-	-	-	1	4	-	-
Waverley Blues	-	-	1	1	2	-	-	-	-	-	-	-	4	-	1	-	-	-	-	-	-
Surrey Park	-	-	1	1	1	-	-	1	-	-	-	-	-	1	-	3	-	1	2	-	-
Templestowe	-	-	1	-	1	-	-	-	-	-	-	-	-	3	-	-	-	-	2	-	-
Forest Hill	-	-	1	-	-	-	-	-	-	-	-	-	1	2	-	6	-	-	2	1	1
Park Orchards	-	-	1	-	-	2	1	-	-	-	-	-	3	1	-	1	-	2	3	2	-
Bennettswood	-	-	1	-	-	-	-	-	-	-	-	-	1	1	-	-	-	1	-	-	-
Yarra Glen	-	-	1	-	-	-	-	-	-	-	-	-	-	-	-	-	-	-	-	-	-
Fairpark	-	-	-	-	1	-	-	-	-	-	-	-	-	5	-	-	-	-	2	-	-
Heathmont	-	-	-	-	4	-	-	-	1	-	-	-	-	1	-	5	-	1	1	-	-
Whitehorse Pioneers	-	-	-	-	3	-	-	-	-	-	-	-	-	-	-	-	-	-	-	1	-
Silvan	-	-	-	-	2	-	-	-	-	-	-	-	-	-	-	-	-	-	-	-	1
South Waverley Sandown	-	-	-	-	2	-	-	-	-	-	-	-	-	-	-	-	-	-	-	-	-
Nunawading	-	-	-	-	1	-	-	-	-	-	-	-	-	2	-	1	-	-	-	-	-
Bennettswood Blackburn South	-	-	-	-	1	-	-	-	-	-	-	-	-	1	-	-	-	-	1	-	-
Chirnside Park	-	-	-	-	1	1	-	-	-	-	-	-	-	1	-	-	-	-	-	1	-
Eastern Devils	-	-	-	-	-	2	-	-	-	-	-	-	-	-	-	-	-	-	-	-	-
Healesville	-	-	-	-	-	-	-	1	-	-	-	-	-	-	-	-	-	-	-	-	-
Waverley	-	-	-	-	-	-	-	-	-	-	-	-	-	-	-	2	-	2	-	-	-
Beaconsfield	-	-	-	-	-	-	-	-	-	-	-	-	-	-	-	-	-	2	-	-	-
Kilsyth South Croydon	-	-	-	-	-	-	-	-	-	-	-	-	-	-	-	-	-	-	1	-	1
Whitehorse South Croydon	-	-	-	-	-	-	-	-	-	-	-	-	-	-	-	-	-	-	-	1	-

=== Division Promotion and Relegation Timeline (Senior Men) ===
==== Additional Information ====
- 1965 - Divisional promotion and relegation began between Division 1 and 2. Clubs such as Scoresby (Division 2 Premiers in 1962, 63, 64, 65) were not promoted despite winning the Division 2 premiership several times and clubs such as Heathmont were not relegated despite having finished last in 1962 and 1964.
- 1971 - Divisional promotion and relegation began between Division 2 and 3. Olinda (Division 3 Premiers in 1965, 66, 67) and Mount Evelyn (Division 3 Premiers in 1969, 70) won several premierships in a row without promotion and clubs such as Mulgrave (Division 2 Last Place 1968, 69) and Upper Ferntree Gully (Division 2 Last Place 1970, 71) were not relegated despite finishing last for two years in a row.
- 1986 - Division 4 was added to the league. The last seven teams of the 1985 Division 3 season were relegated to Division 4 for 1986 (Mount Evelyn, Lilydale, Nunawading, South Wantirna, South Waverley Sandown, Blackburn South and Kilsyth), joining Wonga Park who was admitted as a new club.
- 2019 - With Division 1 becoming Premier Division, Division 2 becoming Division 1 and Division 3 becoming Division 2, the newly created Division 3 comprised the bottom six teams of Division 3 of 2018 (Waverley Blues, Donvale, Ferntree Gully, South Belgrave, Warrandyte and Chirnside Park), as well as the two Grand Finalists of Division 4 of 2018 (Whitehorse Pioneers and Glen Waverley Hawks).

=== Eastern Football Netball League Senior Men's Premiers (1962–present) ===
==== Five Division Competition (2019–) ====
Year	Premier	Division 1	Division 2	Division 3	Division 4
2026	East Ringwood	North Ringwood	Surrey Park	Donvale	Warrandyte
2025	Balwyn	South Belgrave	Wantirna South	Scoresby	Whitehorse Pioneers
2024	Balwyn	Mitcham	Boronia	Surrey Park	Scoresby
2023	Rowville	Mitcham	Boronia	Donvale	Surrey Park
2022	Noble Park	East Ringwood	South Belgrave	Waverley Blues	Silvan
2021	Competition suspended mid-season	Competition suspended mid-season	Competition suspended mid-season	Competition suspended mid-season	Competition suspended mid-season
2020	No competition	No competition	No competition	No competition	No competition
2019	Vermont	Doncaster East	Mitcham	South Belgrave	Fairpark
Year	Premier	Division 1	Division 2	Division 3	Division 4

==== Four Division Competition (1986–2018) ====
Year	Division 1	Division 2	Division 3	Division 4
2018	Vermont	Doncaster East	Boronia	Whitehorse Pioneers
2017	South Croydon	Knox	Park Orchards	Donvale
2016	Balwyn	Bayswater	Upper Ferntree Gully	Ferntree Gully
2015	Balwyn	Doncaster	Mitcham	Warrandyte
2014	Norwood	North Ringwood	Wantirna South	Silvan
2013	Balwyn	Montrose	Doncaster	South Belgrave
2012	Balwyn	Rowville	North Ringwood	The Basin
2011	Noble Park	Lilydale	Doncaster	Heathmont
2010	Noble Park	Mulgrave	Upper FTG	Templestowe
2009	Vermont	South Croydon	Mooroolbark	Chirnside Park
2008	Balwyn	Wantirna South	Waverley Blues	Heathmont
2007	Vermont	Knox	Doncaster East	Whitehorse Pioneers
2006	Vermont	Scoresby	South Croydon	Warrandyte
2005	Vermont	Ringwood	Bayswater	Waverley Blues
2004	Noble Park	Wantirna South	Rowville	Heathmont
2003	Noble Park	Lilydale	Norwood	Rowville
2002	East Ringwood	Blackburn	Wantirna South	Nunawading
2001	Vermont	Donvale	South Croydon	Coldstream
2000	East Burwood	Boronia	Knox	Waverley Blues
1999	East Burwood	North Ringwood	Warrandyte	Norwood
1998	Vermont	Lilydale	Upper FTG	Mount Evelyn
1997	Vermont	Croydon	Templestowe	South Waverley Sandown
1996	Donvale	Lilydale	Doncaster	South Wantirna
1995	Vermont	Bayswater	Kilsyth	Fairpark
1994	Vermont	Donvale	The Basin	Heathmont
1993	Vermont	Clayton	Warrandyte	Doncaster East
1992	East Burwood	Montrose	Donvale	Surrey Hills
1991	Vermont	South Croydon	Lilydale	Knox
1990	Vermont	Doncaster	Coldstream	Kilsyth
1989	Vermont	North Ringwood	Norwood	Bennettswood BBS
1988	Vermont	South Croydon	Mooroolbark	Lilydale
1987	East Burwood	Surrey Hills	Ferntree Gully	South Waverley Sandown
1986	Vermont	Boronia	Coldstream	Mount Evelyn
Year	Division 1	Division 2	Division 3	Division 4

==== Three Division competition (1962–1985) ====
Year	Division 1	Division 2	Division 3
1985	East Burwood	Bayswater	The Basin
1984	East Ringwood	Doncaster	Forest Hill
1983	Vermont	South Croydon	Warrandyte
1982	Vermont	Bayswater	Norwood
1981	Mitcham	Rowville	Montrose
1980	Mitcham	Blackburn	Rowville
1979	Mitcham	Mulgrave	Upper FTG
1978	Ringwood	North Ringwood	Olinda
1977	Scoresby	Blackburn	Boronia
1976	East Burwood	Ringwood	Bennettswood
1975	Mitcham	Kilsyth	Coldstream
1974	Bayswater	East Ringwood	Upper FTG
1973	East Burwood	Bayswater	South Croydon
1972	East Hawthorn	Doncaster	Mount Evelyn
1971	Vermont	Croydon	Mulgrave
1970	Mitcham	East Hawthorn	Mount Evelyn
1969	Vermont	Boronia	Mount Evelyn
1968	East Burwood	Ferntree Gully	Yarra Glen
1967	East Burwood	Surrey Hills	Olinda
1966	East Ringwood	Warrandyte	Olinda
1965	East Burwood	Scoresby	Olinda
1964	East Burwood	Scoresby	No competition
1963	East Burwood	Scoresby	No competition
1962	Ringwood	Scoresby	The Basin
Year	Division 1	Division 2	Division 3

=== Eastern Football Netball League Senior Women's Premiers (2017–present) ===
==== Five Division Competition (2021–2024) ====
Year	Premier	Division 1	Division 2	Division 3	Division 4	Division 5
2026	Park Orchards	Balwyn	Montrose	North Ringwood reserves	Wantirna South	Upper Ferntree Gully
2025	Park Orchards	North Ringwood	Mooroolbark	Heathmont	Vermont Gold	Norwood
2024	South Croydon	Park Orchards	Surrey Park	Mooroolbark	Ferntree Gully	5 divisions (2022-2024)
2023	Eastern Devils	Boronia	East Ringwood	Kilsyth	Mooroolbark	5 divisions (2022-2024)
2022	Eastern Devils	Rowville	Knox	East Burwood	Vermont	5 divisions (2022-2024)
2021	Competition suspended mid-season - COVID-19 (2021)				4 divisions (2021)	
2020	COVID-19 recess (2020)					
Year	Premier	Division 1	Division 2	Division 3	Division 4	Division 5

==== Eastern Region Girls Football League (2017–2019) ====
Year	Division 1	Division 2	North Division	South Division	Outer East Division
2019	Chirnside Park	South Croydon	North Ringwood	Rowville	Healesville
2018	Vermont	Donvale	2 divisions (2018)		
2017	Bayswater	1 division (2017)			
Year	Division 1	Division 2	North Division	South Division	Outer East Division

== Former clubs ==
Club	Jumper	Nickname	Home Ground	Former League	Est.	Years in EFNL	EFNL Senior Premierships		Fate
Club	Jumper	Nickname	Home Ground	Former League	Est.	Years in EFNL	Total	Most recent	Fate
Balwyn Combined		Demons	Macleay Park, Balwyn North	VAFA	1951	1996	0	-	Folded in 1996
Bennettswood		Swans	Bennettswood Reserve, Burwood	ESFL	1959	1968-1986	1	1976	Merged with Blackburn South to form Bennettswood-Blackburn South in 1987
Bennettswood-Blackburn South		Swans		–	1987	1987-1990	1	1989	Folded in 1991
Blackburn South			Mirrabooka Reserve, Blackburn South	ESCFA	1966	1984-1986	0	-	Merged with Bennettswood to form Bennettswood-Blackburn South in 1987
Clayton		Clays	Meade Reserve, Clayton	SESFL	1908	1985-1998	1	1993	Transferred to Southern FNL in 1999
Canterbury		Cobras	Canterbury Sports Ground, Surrey Hills	SFNL	1881	2009-2013	0	-	Transferred to VAFA in 2014
East Hawthorn		Hawks	St. James Park, Hawthorn	NMFL	1931	1970-1972	2	1972	Returned to Northern Metropolitan FL in 1973
Forest Hill		Zebras	Forest Hill Reserve, Forest Hill	–	1967	1970-2026	1	1984	Folded after 2026 season
Mount Evelyn		Rovers	Gary Martin Oval, Mount Evelyn	CFGFL	1931	1962-2001, 2022-2024	5	1998	Transferred to Yarra Ranges FNL in 2002. Women's team transferred to Outer East FNL in 2024
Noble Park Bears		Bears	Parkfield Reserve, Noble Park	ESCFA	c.1962	1989-1996	0	-	Folded in 1996
North Croydon (Wonga Park 1986)		Kangaroos	Brushy Creek Park, Croydon North	ESCFA	c.1982	1986-1990	0	-	Transferred to Yarra Ranges FNL in 1991
Olinda		Bloods	Olinda Recreation Reserve, Olinda	MDFA	1908	1965-1985	4	1978	Transferred to Yarra Ranges FNL in 1986, now known as Olinda-Ferny Creek
Southern Cobras (Sandown 1977-83, South Waverley Sandown 1984-97)		Cobras	Edinburgh Reserve, Springvale	SESFL	1962	1977-1999	2	1997	Entered recess following 1999 season, re-formed in Southern FNL in 2001
Surrey Hills			Surrey Park, Box Hill	CFGFL	1887	1962-1993	3	1992	Merged with East Camberwell to form Surrey Park in 1994
SBL Wolves		Wolves	Belgrave South Recreation Reserve, Belgrave South	–	2017	2017-2023	0	-	De-merged into Lysterfield and South Belgrave Junior Football Clubs
Wandin		Bulldogs	Wandin North Reserve, Wandin North	CFGFL	1909	1962-1971	0	-	Transferred to Yarra Ranges FNL in 1972
Waverley		Panthers	Central Reserve, Glen Waverley	VAFA	1908	1991-1998	0	-	Merged with Mount Waverley Burwood to form Waverley Blues in 1999
Yarra Glen		River Pigs	Yarra Glen Recreation Reserve, Yarra Glen	CFGFL	1888	1962-1984	1	1968	Transferred to Yarra Ranges FNL in 1985
