= Scoresby Football Club =

Australian rules football club

Scoresby
- Full name: Scoresby Football Club
- Nickname: Magpies
- Founded: 1925
- League: Eastern Football League
- Home ground: Scoresby Recreation Reserve

Strip
- Black with white stripes

The Scoresby Football Club is an Australian rules football club located in Scoresby, Victoria. They play in Division 3 of the Eastern Football League.

== History ==
The club was a founding member of the Scoresby District Football Association in 1925 and went into recess when the competition ended in 1930. They reformed after World War II and won the 1947 Dandenong District Football Association B Grade premiership at their first attempt. They left the competition after the 1951 season.

In 1952 the club renamed itself Wantirna and moved to the Croydon-Ferntree Gully Football League which was the forerunner of the Eastern Football League. It reverted its name back to Scoresby in 1954 and has remained in the competition to this day.
