= Holm Park Recreation Reserve =

Multi-sports complex in Beaconsfield, Victoria

Holm Park Reserve
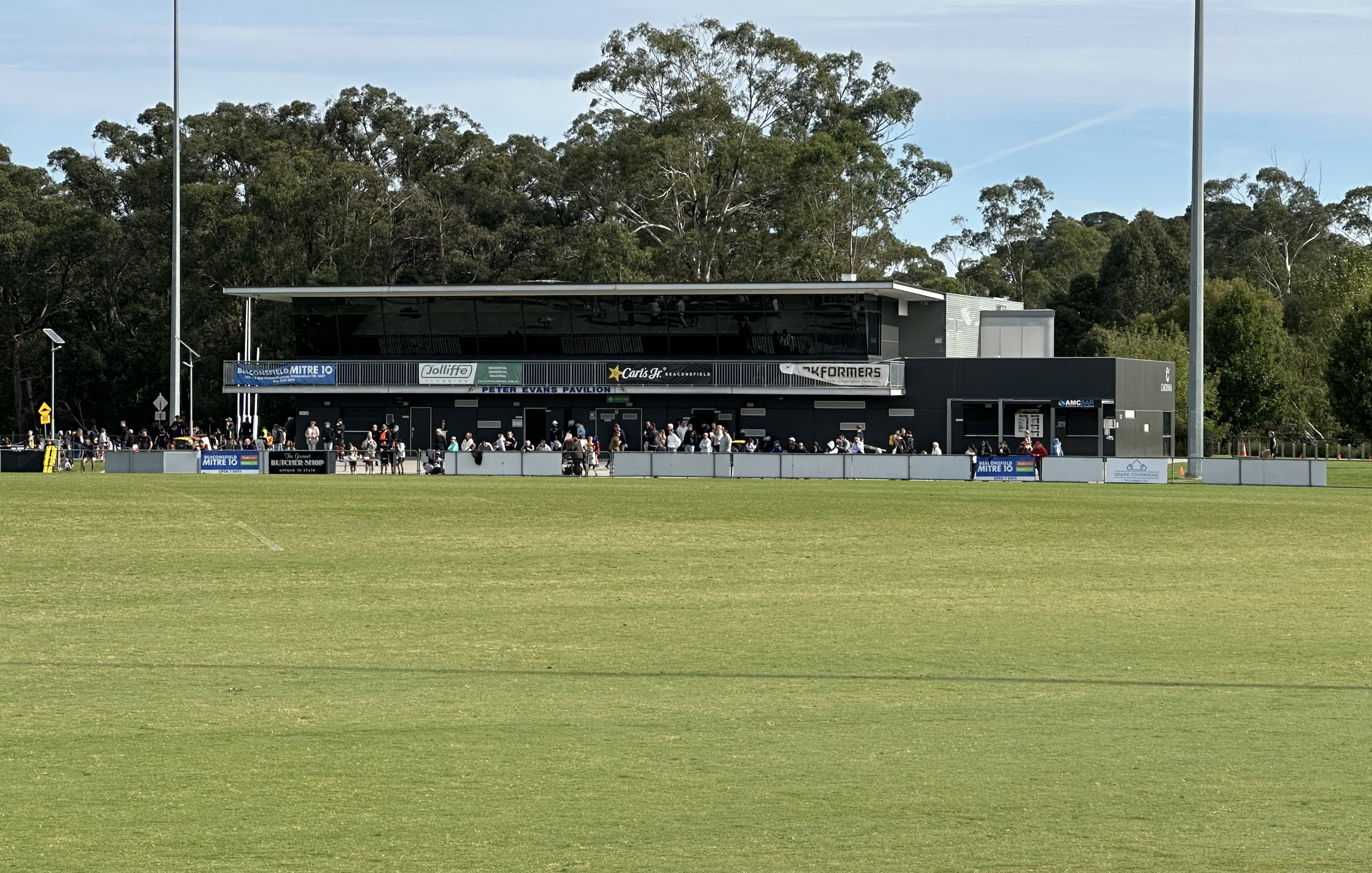
- Interactive map of Holm Park Reserve
- Location: Beaconsfield-Emerald Rd, Beaconsfield, Victoria
- Coordinates: 38.0367°S 145.3732°E
- Owner: Shire of Cardinia
- Capacity: 7,000
- Record attendance: 6,384 (Richmond v Hawthorn, 2016 NAB Challenge)

Construction
- Opened: 13 April 2013; 13 years ago

Tenant
- Beaconsfield Eagles Football Club (EFNL)

Holm Park Recreation Reserve (sometimes referred to as Holm Park Reserve or simply Holm Park) is a multi-sports complex in the Melbourne suburb of Beaconsfield. It includes three Australian rules football ovals (two with cricket wickets), four netball courts, and a skate park.

Holm Park is the home of the Beaconsfield Eagles Football Club, which competes in the Eastern Football Netball League (EFNL).

== History ==
Holm Park officially opened on 13 April 2013 following several years of development.

After entering into a partnership with the Cardinia Shire Council, the Richmond Football Club hosted an Australian Football League (AFL) pre-season match in 2016 at Holm Park.

Richmond has also used the ground for several pre-season open training sessions, and its reserves team has hosted several Victorian Football League (VFL) games at the ground in 2017 and 2018.

Because of redevelopment at Punt Road Oval, Richmond played a number of home matches at Holm Park during the 2025 VFL season.
