= Bayswater Football Club =

Australian rules football club in Victoria, Australia

Bayswater
- Full name: Bayswater Football Club
- Nickname: The Waters
- Founded: 1895
- League: Eastern Football League
- Home ground: Bayswater Oval

Strip
- Green with Yellow V

The Bayswater Football Club is an Australian rules football club located in Bayswater, Victoria. They play in Division 1 of the Eastern Football League.

== History ==
The club was founded in 1895. Their first known match was played on 8 June that year against Rosedale, who came from Box Hill. Bayswater lost 5 goals 6 behinds to 2 goals 2 behinds, the goal kickers being A. Moore and Ingwerson.

It wasn't until 1902 that a proper club was formed — "A football club has been started in Bayswater with the following office-bearers :— President, ex-Cr Cottingham; vice-president, Mr E. Kleinert; captain, V. Saligari; treasurer, R. Williams; secretary, R. Tyner."

In 1903 they joined their first competition, the Box Hill Reporter Football Association, but, after only winning 2 matches they dropped out again.

Bayswater did not join any competitions, and appeared to have lapsed between 1904 and 1912. The club re-appeared in 1913 and then played various opponents until 1915, although they were just challenge matches and not part of any competition. In 1916 30 members of the club were on active service and Bayswater went into recess during WW1.

Bayswater reformed in 1919 after the war and joined the Mountain District Football Association, playing against Monbulk, Emerald, Ferny Creek and Belgrave, where they finished third. Their captain and star player was Fred Finch, who later joined Hawthorn in the VFA in 1922 and was in Hawthorn's first ever VFL team in 1925. Finch also captained a Victorian team against Ballarat in 1926.

In 1920 and 1921 Bayswater was again unaffiliated and played social matches. From 1922 until 1925 the club again lapsed.

It wasn't until 1926 that the club re-emerged, joining the Scoresby District Football Association and finished fifth. In 1927 the club became Bayswater-Boronia. This was the first appearance of the Boronia club, as part of a merged entity. Bayswater-Boronia won the 1927 Scoresby FA premiership, defeating East Burwood 8.13.61 to 6.7.43. The club finished third in 1928 and was runners-up in 1929.

In 1930 Boronia broke away from the merger and remained in the Scoresby FA when Bayswater joined the Ringwood District Football Association and played in that competition until it disbanded for WW2.

Bayswater joined the newly formed Croydon Mail Football League in 1945 after the war and won the first premiership there, defeating Croydon by 28 points in the Grand Final that year.

The Croydon Mail League became the Croydon-Ferntree Gully FL and Bayswater remained in that competition. They were a founding member of the Eastern District Football League in 1962.
