= Beaconsfield Eagles Football Club =

Australian rules football club

Beaconsfield Football Club

Names
- Full name: Beaconsfield Football Club
- Nickname(s): Eagles, Beacy
- Motto: ‘Bless 'Em All’

Club details
- Founded: 1890; 136 years ago
- Colours: Navy White Gold
- Competition: Outer East Football Netball League
- Premierships: 10 (Seniors)
- Ground: Holm Park
- Training ground: Beaconsfield Recreation Reserve

Uniforms
Home	Away

Other information
- Official website: baconsfieldfc.com

The Beaconsfield Football Club, nicknamed the Eagles or less formally the Beacy is an Australian rules football club in the Outer East Football Netball League (OEFNL) It is based at Holm Park in the southern-eastern Melbourne suburb of Beaconsfield, Victoria.

== History ==
Formed after a public meeting on the 21 April 1890, at Gissing’s Gippsland Hotel, Beaconsfield (now the Central Hotel), it was agreed to form a football club. A team representing the Town of Beaconsfield played a number of friendly matches that year. Their first game was against Cranbourne in which they lost. Beaconsfield then went onto play Berwick and Pakenham, and lost every game.

Despite initial enthusiasm the club rarely participated in any organised competitions until after WWII.

After a recess during the war years, the club reformed in 1947 as Officer-Beaconsfield, competing in the Dandenong & District Football Association, In 1948 it reverted to the Beaconsfield Football Club and achieved its first premiership in 1953 when it defeated Keysborough in the B grade Grand Final.

In 1954 Beaconsfield was a foundation member of the South West Gippsland Football League, and won premierships in 1974, 1980 and 1981.

In 1993 the club transferred to West Gippsland Football League and had success in 1999 and 2001.

A major VCFL restructure saw Beaconsfield join the Mornington Peninsula Nepean Football League in 2002 and senior premierships were achieved in 2003, 2004 and 2014.

The club was part of a breakaway group of club the founded the short lived South East Football Netball League in 2015. The SEFNL would later merge with the AFL Yarra Ranges and the competition is now called Outer East Football Netball League. They will play their first season in Premier Division.

== Premierships ==
- 1953, 1974, 1980, 1981, 1982, 1999, 2001, 2003, 2004, 2014

== VFL/AFL players ==
- Austinn Jones - St Kilda
- Barry Allan (North Melbourne)
- Michael McKenna (Richmond/Footscray)
- Brandon White (St Kilda)
- Chris Newman (Richmond)
- Brendan Fevola - Carlton , Brisbane Lions
- Shane Tuck - Richmond
- Jake Aarts - Richmond
- Cody Weightman-Western Bulldogs
- Tom Bugg, GWS Giants, Melbourne
- Tom Jok, Essendon
- Levi Casboult, Carlton
- Sullivan Robey, Essendon
