= Chirnside Park Football Club =

Australian rules football club

Chirnside Park
- Full name: Chirnside Park Football Club
- Nickname: Panthers
- Founded: 1978
- League: Eastern Football League
- Home ground: Kimberley Reserve

Strip
- Black, yellow and white panels

The Chirnside Park Football Club is an Australian rules football club located in Chirnside Park, Victoria. They play in Division 4 of the Eastern Football League.

== History ==
The mighty Panthers were founded in 1978 to cater for the expanding number of juniors wanting to learn to play football. Chirnside Park first fielded a senior side in the year 2000, competing in division four. Chirnside Park won the senior premiership in fourth division in 2009 with ex Warburton-Millgrove champion Jason Degraaf coaching the club. The senior premiership coming just one year after the success of the colts premiership in 2008. Stephen Pepping is the club's most decorated player and some consider the greatest player to have ever played in Division 4.

Chirnside Park have competed in the third division or the Eastern Football League since 2010. A league restructure (from four divisions to five divisions) by the Eastern Football League in 2019 moved Chirnside Park from division three to division four. This being the first year the club changed divisions since the inaugural Premiership in 2009 after it was decided the bottom six teams from division three would be relegated to make up the new division four.

Next year, 2026, the club is looking to reach the heights of 2009 and realise premiership success again and that was evident this week, when they announced the prized signing of Mitch Nugent, a cult figure and hard man of Eastern Football League.
