= Wantirna South Football Club =

Wantirna South
- Full name: Wantirna South Football Club
- Nickname: Devils
- Founded: 1952
- League: Eastern Football League
- Home ground: Walker Reserve, Wantirna South
- Senior Premierships: 1958, 1996, 2002, 2004, 2008, 2014, 2025

Strip
- Green & White

Wantirna South Football Club nicknamed the Devils, is an Australian rules football club located 26 km south east of Melbourne in the suburb of Wantirna. The teams wears a bottle-green playing jumper with two white stripes.

Established in 1952 and situated at Walker Reserve Tyner Road in Wantirna South.

Previously known as South Wantirna Football Club until 1997 when club merged with the Wantirna Junior Football Club.

The club competes in Eastern Football Netball League, currently in Division 1 (2026).

== Timeline of the Wantirna South Football Club - Devils ==
=== 1952-1956 Croydon-Ferntree Gully Football League - B Grade. ===
Tragedy struck the Walker family in 1953 with the accidental drowning of Jim Walker and his daughter Lorraine at Phillip Island. The community got together and erected the entrance gates at Tyner Road and a plaque in their memory. From that day the three parcels of land are known as Walker Reserve. The Football club however was new and had minimal success in this league.

=== 1957-1964 Mountain District Football League ===
==== 1957-1958: B Grade ====
1957 - B Grade Runners up in first season.

1958 - The Devils win club's first senior premiership defeating Silvan in B grade and promoted to A Grade for 1959.

==== 1959-1964: A Grade ====
1959 - Struggled in the top Grade and eventually were wooden spooners (last) in 1960 and 1961.

==== 1965-1966: Division 2 - Eastern Districts Football League ====
Moved to Eastern Districts Football League and competed in Division 2

Only one win for the first two seasons and demoted to Division 3 for 1967

==== 1967-1985: Division 3 ====
A long lean era for the club.

The Club failed to make finals at any stage, although some encouraging seasons were had. Eventually demoted at the end of 1985 to the newly established Division 4.

==== 1986-1996: Division 4 ====
The 1986 season saw the League add a fourth Division and the club was a founding member of this new lower Grade.

1988 - The club played Finals for the first time since its premiership season of 1958. The Devils lost both finals to Lilydale and Nunawading respectively.

1991 - The Devils finished last of Division 4, winning only 2 games for the season.

1992 & 1993 saw improvement, but no finals appearances

1994 - Senior & Reserves teams qualified for the Finals, but the Seniors lost the Preliminary final to Sandown, and the reserves lost the Grand Final to Mt.Evelyn.

1995 - Saw the club reform an Under 18's side, and had one of its most successful seasons with all three senior sides reaching the Grand Final, but only the Reserves won the premiership. The seniors were runners up, losing to Fairpark by four points and the U18's lost to Rowville.

1996 - This season was the club's most successful to this point. Both senior and reserve sides were premiers & named champion club of the EDFL. This was the club's first premiership in Eastern Football League, after defeating Waverley in the Grand Final by 25 points. “Devils Double”

==== 1997-2002: Division 3 ====
Newly promoted to Division 3 the club spent most of its time around the middle of the ladder.

2000 - The U18 team won the premiership.

2002 - The club won its second Eastern Football League, premiership defeating Doncaster East by three points. It was also the Devils Golden Jubilee year, providing an opportunity to remember club men and women who contributed to the club.

==== 2003-2004: Division 2 ====
2003 - Promoted to Division 2 for the first time since 1966, the club had an immediate impact although just failed to reach the finals. The Reserves won the premiership.

2004 - Wantirna South won its third Eastern Football League premiership defeating Montrose in the Grand Final by two points.

==== 2005: Division 1 ====
Entering the top Grade for the first time, won only two games for the season and relegated back to Division 2.

==== 2006-2008: Division 2 ====
2006 - The Devils spent most of the season around the top of the ladder but lost both Finals matches.

2007 - Finished fifth.

2008 - Finished top of the table after the regular season, and won its fourth Eastern Football League premiership defeating Mulgrave by 98 points and promotion to Division 1 for season 2009.

==== 2009: Division 1 ====
2009 - Finished 12th (last) demoted to Division 2 for 2010 season

==== 2010 - 2011: Division 2 ====
Lean years for the club, which included a temporary relocation to a sub standard Wantirna reserve while the Walker reserve ground was being renovated with a new modern grass surface, drainage and watering system.

2010 - U18 team won the premiership.

2011 - Club finished last and relegated to Division 3 for the 2012 season

==== 2012 - 2014: Division 3 ====
2013 - Lost Grand Final to Doncaster after a strong season.

2014 - The Devils finished the regular season in the top 2 and won the 2014 Division 3 premiership, defeating Templestowe and promoted to Division 2 for 2015. Reserve team also won the premiership- “Devils Double”

==== 2015 - 2018: Division 2 ====
2015 - Started the year well but dropped off due to a mounting injury list finishing outside the top 4 in Division 2, the reserves were in 1st place most of the year but unfortunately lost the grand final.

2016 - The club was hopeful of adding another premiership to its collection with a welcome return to winning more games during the home and away season. The club finished the season runners up however, losing heavily to Bayswater in the Division 2 Grand Final.

2017 - Finished 7th of 10

2018 - The club finished 7th of 10. Note: the 2 bottom clubs at the end of 2018 (9th & 10th) were relegated under the EFL restructure for the 2019 season.

==== 2019 - 2024: Division 1 ====
2019 - Due to the restructure of the Eastern Football League, the Devils competed in what was now known as Division 1. This is the same tier the club had been competing in since 2015, but with the renaming of Division 1 to Premier Division, the 2nd Division was renamed Division 1. After the restructure, the league had 5 divisions with 45 Senior clubs competing.

In 2019, the club finished the regular season 9th of 10. The senior team won 6 games and drew one avoiding relegation by only 2 points in what was a very even competition particularly between the bottom 6 clubs. The Devils neighbourhood rivals Knox, were relegated to Division 2, despite winning 6 games.

2020 - Season abandoned due to Victorian Government imposing liberty restrictions in response to the COVID-19 pandemic. The Devils continued to compete in Division 1 for season 2021.

2021 - Season commenced but was interrupted due to Government restrictions in response to the ongoing pandemic. 11 games were played before the season was abandoned. The Senior team won 4 of the 11 games played and finished 7th of 10. Under 19 Team finished on top for the season, but no finals series was played.

2022 - All 3 teams played in the Finals series.

The Reserves finished the regular season 3rd of 10, winning 12 games, losing 5 and had a draw. The Reserves lost the 2nd Semil Final, but rebounded to win the Preliminary Final. The Grand Final against Mitcham saw the Devils Reserves team win the Premiership for 2022.

The Senior team won 10 & lost 8 in the regular season, finishing 5th of 10. Montrose defeated Wantirna South in the Elimination Final. The U19.5 Division 1 team lost both finals after finishing the season 3rd of 10. The U19's won 14 & lost 4 games in the regular season.

2023 - Senior team won 8 & lost 10 in the regular season, finishing 7th of 10. The U19.5 Division 1 team won 9 & lost 9, finishing 6th of 10.

At the end of the 2023 season, the bottom 2 clubs were relegated to Division 2. That is 9th & 10th, Croydon & Lilydale.

The Devils Reserve team finished on top of the table winning 14, losing 4. After winning the 2nd Semi Final against Mitcham the team found itself against the same club in the Grand Final. The Devils Reserves Team won the Premiership in defeating Mitcham for the 2nd year running.

2024 - The Devils Senior team only scored one win for the season, finishing last in Division 1. The club was relegate to Division 2 for the 2025 season.

==== 2025: Division 2 ====
2025 - The Devils Senior Team finished 2nd on the ladder of 10, with 13 Wins, 4 Losses and 1 Draw. After losing the first final, the club recovered to make it to the Grand Final against Templestowe. In an exciting game, the Devils Senior Team won the premiership game by 1 point.

== Senior Premierships (6) ==
- Mountain District Football League
  1. 1958 - Division B
- Eastern Football League
  1. 1996 - Division 4
  2. 2002 - Division 3
  3. 2004 - Division 2
  4. 2008 - Division 2
  5. 2014 - Division 3
  6. 2025 - Division 2

== Senior Premiership Coaches & Captains ==
1958:

Coach & Captain - Trevor Wightman

1996:

Coach - Laurie Anderson (playing)

Captain - Brendan Ferres

2002:

Coach - Stevan Jackson

Captain - Jason Heffernan

2004:

Coach - Lee Rowe (playing)

Captain - Michael Jamieson

2008:

Coach - Jason Heatley

Captain - Scott Edgcumbe

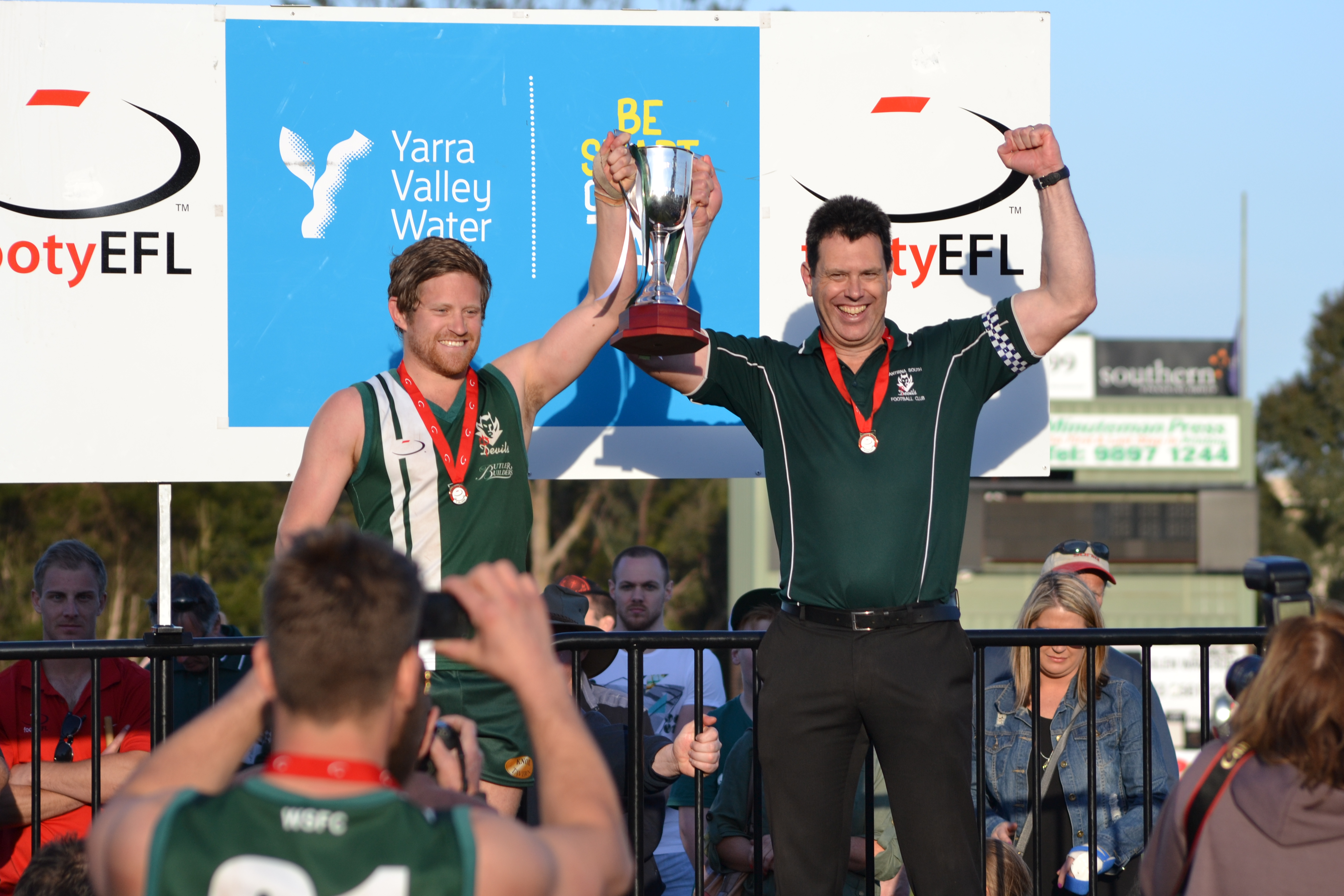
Wantirna South FC Captain Andrew Teakel, Senior Coach Matthew Clark, Premiers 2014

2014:

Coach - Matthew Clark

Captain - Andrew Teakel

2025:

Coach - Jason Heffernan

Captain - Jake Denes

== AFL Players ==
- Rayden Tallis Hawthorn Hawks
- Kieran McGuinness - Western Bulldogs.
- Aaron Young - Port Adelaide Power, Gold Coast Suns
- Ayden Kennedy - North Melbourne Kangaroos
- Mac Andrew - Gold Coast Suns
