= 2024 EFNL season =

62nd season of the Eastern Football Netball League

- Date: 5 April - 21 September 2024
- Teams: 47
- Matches played: 444 (seniors)

The 2024 EFNL season was the 62nd season of the Eastern Football Netball League (EFNL), the Australian rules football competition based largely in the eastern suburbs of metropolitan Melbourne, Victoria. The season featured 47 clubs across five divisions. It ran from 5 April to 21 September, with the top four divisions comprising an 18-round home-and-away season, followed by a four-week finals series featuring the top five teams. (Note: Division 2 U19.5 played an extra round; Division 4 comprised a 19-round home-and-away season, with a three-week finals series featuring the top four teams.)

== Background ==
=== Team changes ===
After a relegation battle the previous season that went up until the final round, Park Orchards suffered their first relegation in senior club history to drop back to Division 1.

Lilydale's fate was confirmed after only 14 rounds, going on to record a winless season for the first time in club history en route to Division 2.

Upper Ferntree Gully experienced the unfortunate distinction of back-to-back relegations into Division 3, winning only 1 match across the previous 2 seasons.

Surrey Park entered the fourth tier for the first time since the fifth tier was formed in 2019. It was also the first time they were promoted in their 22-year history in the league.

2024 EFNL season
Division	Promoted to division ▲	Relegated to division ▼
Premier	None (Note: As part of a league restructuring, no sides were promoted from Division 1, 2 or 3 following the 2023 season, with two clubs being relegated from Premier Division, Division 1 and 2.)	N/A
1	None	Park Orchards; Doncaster
2	None	Croydon; Lilydale
3	Surrey Park	Knox; Upper Ferntree Gully
4	N/A	Whitehorse Pioneers

== Premier Division ==
2024 Premier Division season
- Date: 13 April - 21 September 2024
- Teams: 10 (Note: South Croydon did not field an U19.5 team in Premier Division; a combined Ferntree Gully/South Croydon team competed in Division 4.)
- Premiers: Seniors; Balwyn (6th first division premiership); Reserves; East Ringwood (15th first division premiership); U19.5; Blackburn (6th first division premiership)
- Best and fairest: Chandler Medal; James Belo (27); East Ringwood; Reserves; Joel Holewa (12); Blackburn; Jayden Phillips (12); Doncaster East; U19.5; Luke Molinaro (21); Noble Park
- Leading goalkicker: Seniors; Charlie Haley (51); Balwyn; Reserves; Hayden Telford (45); Blackburn; U19.5; Xavier Borg (46); East Ringwood; Oscar Dunn (46); Vermont

=== Seniors ===
Balwyn won the first division premiership for the 6th time, and their 6th overall since joining the EFNL in 2007. They defeated minor premiers East Ringwood by 2 points in the grand final. It was Balwyn's first senior premiership in eight years.

2014 premiers Norwood finished last and were subsequently relegated to Division 1 for 2025 after a 17-season stint in the top flight.

==== Ladder ====
Pos	Team	Pld	W	L	D	PF	PA	%	Pts	Qualification
1	East Ringwood	18	16	2	0	1709	1034	165.3	64	Finals series
2	Balwyn (P)	18	13	5	0	1540	1038	148.4	52	Finals series
3	Rowville	18	12	6	0	1561	1158	134.8	48	Finals series
4	Vermont	18	12	6	0	1464	1263	115.9	48	Finals series
5	South Croydon	18	12	6	0	1341	1210	110.8	48	Finals series
6	Blackburn	18	11	7	0	1637	1125	145.5	44	
7	Noble Park	18	6	12	0	1288	1238	104.0	24	
8	Doncaster East	18	5	13	0	1177	1556	75.6	20	
9	Berwick	18	2	16	0	810	1713	47.3	8	
10	Norwood (R)	18	1	17	0	777	1969	39.5	4	Relegation to Division 1

Rules for classification: 1) points; 2) percentage; 3) points for
(P) Premiers; (R) Relegated

==== Finals series ====
Qualifying and elimination finals
31 August, Bayswater Oval
2	Balwyn	14.9 (93)
3	Rowville	11.7 (73)
1 September, Jubilee Park
4	Vermont	10.7 (67)
5	South Croydon	11.11 (77)

Semi-finals
7 September, Bayswater Oval
1	East Ringwood	7.8 (50)
Balwyn	8.5 (53)
8 September, Jubilee Park
Rowville	17.6 (108)
South Croydon	8.9 (57)

Preliminary final
14 September, Bayswater Oval
East Ringwood	8.12 (60)
Rowville	3.6 (24)

Grand final
21 September, Bayswater Oval
Balwyn	7.11 (53)
East Ringwood	7.9 (51)

2024 EFNL Men's Premier Division Grand Final
Saturday, 21 September (2:20pm)	Balwyn	v	East Ringwood	Bayswater Oval	Report
3.4 (22); 5.8 (38); 5.9 (39); 7.11 (53)	Q1; Q2; Q3; Final	2.1 (13); 3.3 (21); 4.8 (32); 7.9 (51)	Cliff Tomkins Medal: Bowen Smith (Balwyn); Television broadcast: YouTube
Haley, La Motte, Lisle, Oakes, Smith, Ja Sticca, Tillig	Goals	J Belo, J Bennell, Fox, Lowson, MacRae, Preston, Weatherill
Smith, N Lever, Cunningham, Schreiber, Pollocks, Urban	Best	Delaney, C Weightman, J Weightman, J Belo, Cerni, Coghlan

=== Reserves ===
==== Ladder ====
Pos	Team	Pld	W	L	D	F	PF	PA	%	Pts	Qualification
1	Blackburn	18	16	2	0	0	1706	558	305.7	64	Finals series
2	East Ringwood (P)	18	14	3	1	0	1385	604	229.3	58	Finals series
3	Vermont	18	13	5	0	0	1418	621	228.3	52	Finals series
4	Rowville	18	11	6	1	0	1299	631	205.9	46	Finals series
5	Noble Park	18	10	8	0	0	1291	788	163.8	40	Finals series
6	Balwyn	18	8	9	1	0	1281	832	154.0	34	
7	Doncaster East	18	7	10	1	0	1032	959	107.6	30	
8	South Croydon	18	7	11	0	0	929	925	100.4	28	
9	Berwick	18	2	16	0	0	392	1919	20.4	8	
10	Norwood	18	0	17	0	1	110	3006	3.7	0	

Rules for classification: 1) points; 2) percentage; 3) points for
(P) Premiers

==== Finals series ====
Qualifying and elimination finals
31 August, Bayswater Oval
2	East Ringwood	6.9 (45)
3	Vermont	3.4 (22)
1 September, Jubilee Park
4	Rowville	13.8 (86)
5	Noble Park	5.7 (37)

Semi-finals
7 September, Bayswater Oval
1	Blackburn	5.8 (38)
East Ringwood	6.10 (46)
8 September, Jubilee Park
Vermont	4.5 (29)
Rowville	10.5 (65)

Preliminary final
14 September, Bayswater Oval
Blackburn	5.8 (38)
Rowville	3.4 (22)

Grand final
21 September, Bayswater Oval
East Ringwood	10.6 (66)
Blackburn	8.6 (54)

2024 EFNL Men's Premier Division Reserves Grand Final
Saturday, 21 September (12:05pm)	East Ringwood	v	Blackburn	Bayswater Oval
2.1 (13); 5.2 (32); 8.4 (54); 10.6 (66)	Q1; Q2; Q3; Final	2.1 (13); 5.2 (32); 5.6 (36); 8.6 (54)	Best on Ground Medal: Sahaf Ali (East Ringwood); Television broadcast: YouTube
Ali 3, Cileceken 3, Guymer 2, Copeland, Fairy	Goals	Telford 2, Worsam 2, Epple, Harte, Patterson
Percy, Guymer, Keedle, Ali, Cileceken, Fitzgerald	Best	Epple, Rogers, Gregory, Brown, Telford, Holewa

=== U19.5 ===
==== Ladder ====
Pos	Team	Pld	W	L	D	F	PF	PA	%	Pts	Qualification
1	Blackburn (P)	16	16	0	0	0	1611	450	358.0	64	Finals series
2	Vermont	16	10	6	0	0	1312	730	179.7	40	Finals series
3	East Ringwood	16	10	6	0	0	1272	767	165.8	40	Finals series
4	Noble Park	16	10	6	0	0	1057	1033	102.3	40	Finals series
5	Berwick	16	9	7	0	0	993	686	144.8	36	Finals series
6	Rowville	16	10	6	0	0	1034	825	125.3	36	
7	Doncaster East	16	6	10	0	0	778	1214	64.1	24	
8	Norwood	16	2	14	0	0	584	1422	41.1	8	
9	Balwyn	16	0	13	0	3	243	1757	13.8	0	

Rules for classification: 1) points; 2) percentage; 3) points for
(P) Premiers

==== Finals series ====
Qualifying and elimination finals
31 August, Bayswater Oval
2	Vermont	5.6 (36)
3	East Ringwood	8.5 (53)
1 September, Jubilee Park
4	Noble Park	7.8 (50)
5	Berwick	10.11 (71)

Semi-finals
7 September, Bayswater Oval
1	Blackburn	11.8 (74)
East Ringwood	7.7 (49)
8 September, Jubilee Park
Vermont	6.13 (49)
Berwick	9.3 (57)

Preliminary final
14 September, Bayswater Oval
East Ringwood	5.10 (40)
Berwick	5.5 (35)

Grand final
21 September, Bayswater Oval
Blackburn	11.10 (76)
East Ringwood	3.4 (22)

2024 EFNL Men's Premier Division U19.5 Grand Final
Saturday, 21 September (9:45am)	Blackburn	v	East Ringwood	Bayswater Oval
3.1 (19); 7.4 (46); 10.5 (65); 11.10 (76)	Q1; Q2; Q3; Final	0.0 (0); 0.1 (1); 2.3 (15); 3.4 (22)	Best on Ground Medal: Ethan Wright (Blackburn); Television broadcast: YouTube
Brisbane 2, Cook 2, Wright 2, Cotroneo, Geilman, Greenwood, Reilly, Stewart	Goals	Kennedy, Webster
Wright, Downie, Stewart, Hickey, Cook, Evans	Best	Seymour, Hewitson, Kennedy, Mooney, Webster

== Division 1 ==
2024 Division 1 season
- Date: 6 April - 14 September 2024
- Teams: 10 (Note: Doncaster did not field an U19.5 team and were replaced by Surrey Park.)
- Premiers: Seniors; Mitcham (2nd second division premiership); Reserves; South Belgrave (1st second division premiership); U19.5; Surrey Park (1st second division premiership)
- Best and fairest: Wright Medal; Michael Prosenak (28); Park Orchards; Reserves; Daniel John (15); North Ringwood; U19.5; Marley Appleyard (29); Beaconsfield
- Leading goalkicker: Seniors; Ryan Garthwaite (56); Montrose; Reserves; Ryley McKernan (42); Montrose; Christopher Dergacz (42); South Belgrave; U19.5; Tom Hunt (46); Surrey Park

=== Seniors ===
Mitcham won the second division premiership for the 2nd time, and their 9th overall since becoming a founding member of the league in 1962. They defeated minor premiers Park Orchards by 40 points in the grand final to go back-to-back in Division 1. (Note: Due to a league restructuring, Mitcham did not go up to Premier Division the previous year, despite winning the 2023 Division 1 premiership.) With this victory, Mitcham were promoted to Premier Division for 2025, returning to the top flight for the first time since 2006.

Wantirna South finished last and were subsequently relegated to Division 2 for 2025 after a 9-season stint in the second tier.

==== Ladder ====
Pos	Team	Pld	W	L	D	PF	PA	%	Pts	Qualification
1	Park Orchards	18	17	1	0	1745	1079	161.7	68	Finals series
2	South Belgrave	18	14	4	0	1509	1094	137.9	56	Finals series
3	Mitcham (P)	18	13	5	0	1493	1141	130.9	52	Finals series
4	Montrose	18	12	6	0	1555	1128	137.9	48	Finals series
5	Beaconsfield	18	11	7	0	1388	1025	135.4	44	Finals series
6	Mooroolbark	18	9	9	0	1256	1409	89.1	36	
7	North Ringwood	18	5	13	0	1229	1444	85.1	20	
8	Bayswater	18	5	13	0	1053	1455	72.4	20	
9	Doncaster	18	3	15	0	965	1693	57.0	12	
10	Wantirna South (R)	18	1	17	0	1102	1827	60.3	4	Relegation to Division 2

Rules for classification: 1) points; 2) percentage; 3) points for
(P) Premiers; (R) Relegated

==== Finals series ====
Qualifying and elimination finals
24 August, Tormore Reserve
2	South Belgrave	5.19 (49)
3	Mitcham	12.3 (75)
25 August, Tormore Reserve
4	Montrose	5.9 (39)
5	Beaconsfield	13.11 (89)

Semi-finals
31 August, Tormore Reserve
1	Park Orchards	6.7 (43)
Mitcham	10.11 (71)
1 September, Tormore Reserve
South Belgrave	7.10 (52)
Beaconsfield	7.13 (55)

Preliminary final
7 September, Tormore Reserve
Park Orchards	12.3 (75)
Beaconsfield	9.13 (67)

Grand final
14 September, Tormore Reserve
Mitcham	8.7 (55)
Park Orchards	2.3 (15)

2024 EFNL Men's Division 1 Grand Final
Saturday, 14 September (2:20pm)	Mitcham	v	Park Orchards	Tormore Reserve	Report
0.2 (2); 6.3 (39); 8.5 (53); 8.7 (55)	Q1; Q2; Q3; Final	0.1 (1); 0.1 (1); 1.2 (8); 2.3 (15)	Gordon Parker Medal: Nicholas Caulfield (Mitcham); Television broadcast: YouTube
Parente 2, Barton-Smith, Cherry, J Hallo, Laughlin, Pirzas, Uren	Goals	Co Hickey, Macrokanis
Caulfield, N Hallo, Cherry, May, Baglava, Du Vallon	Best	Heron, Haythorne, Keppel, Magnano, Macrokanis, Witnish

=== Reserves ===
==== Ladder ====
Pos	Team	Pld	W	L	D	PF	PA	%	Pts	Qualification
1	South Belgrave (P)	18	17	1	0	1787	467	382.7	68	Finals series
2	Montrose	18	16	2	0	1492	562	265.1	64	Finals series
3	Mitcham	18	15	3	0	1222	667	183.2	60	Finals series
4	Beaconsfield	18	10	8	0	1131	770	146.9	40	Finals series
5	Park Orchards	18	8	10	0	1029	838	122.8	32	Finals series
6	North Ringwood	18	8	10	0	1097	894	122.7	32	
7	Bayswater	18	6	12	0	809	1026	78.9	24	
8	Wantirna South	18	6	12	0	730	1261	57.9	24	
9	Doncaster	18	3	15	0	447	1523	29.4	12	
10	Mooroolbark	18	1	17	0	367	2101	17.5	4	

Rules for classification: 1) points; 2) percentage; 3) points for
(P) Premiers

==== Finals series ====
Qualifying and elimination finals
24 August, Tormore Reserve
2	Montrose	8.7 (55)
3	Mitcham	3.10 (28)
25 August, Tormore Reserve
4	Beaconsfield	3.8 (26)
5	Park Orchards	7.4 (46)

Semi-finals
31 August, Tormore Reserve
1	South Belgrave	6.8 (44)
Montrose	6.7 (43)
1 September, Tormore Reserve
Mitcham	3.7 (25)
Park Orchards	5.6 (36)

Preliminary final
7 September, Tormore Reserve
Montrose	9.12 (66)
Park Orchards	4.4 (28)

Grand final
14 September, Tormore Reserve
South Belgrave	9.5 (59)
Montrose	0.4 (4)

2024 EFNL Men's Division 1 Reserves Grand Final
Saturday, 14 September (12.05pm)	South Belgrave	v	Montrose	Tormore Reserve
3.3 (21); 5.4 (34); 8.5 (53); 9.5 (59)	Q1; Q2; Q3; Final	0.0 (0); 0.1 (1); 0.1 (1); 0.4 (4)	Best on Ground Award: Darcy Walls (South Belgrave); Television broadcast: YouTube
Butler, Costa, Daraio, Dergacz, Pruden, Richards-West, Walls, L Withers, T Withers	Goals
Benson, Walls, T Withers, Laub, L Withers, Briginshaw	Best	Gardoll, Thomas, Mills, Curnow, Bowden, Batten-Leitch

=== U19.5 ===
==== Ladder ====
Pos	Team	Pld	W	L	D	PF	PA	%	Pts	Qualification
1	Surrey Park (P)	18	15	3	0	1393	570	244.4	60	Finals series
2	Mitcham	18	15	3	0	1353	626	216.1	60	Finals series
3	Park Orchards	18	13	5	0	1278	849	150.5	52	Finals series
4	South Belgrave	18	12	6	0	1276	681	187.4	48	Finals series
5	North Ringwood	18	11	7	0	1167	723	161.4	44	Finals series
6	Beaconsfield	18	10	7	1	978	723	135.3	42	
7	Wantirna South	18	6	12	0	791	1109	71.3	24	
8	Mooroolbark	18	4	13	1	582	1317	44.2	18	
9	Montrose	18	2	16	0	864	1456	59.3	8	
10	Bayswater	18	1	17	0	282	1910	14.8	4	

Rules for classification: 1) points; 2) percentage; 3) points for
(P) Premiers

==== Finals series ====
Qualifying and elimination finals
24 August, Tormore Reserve
2	Mitcham	4.15 (39)
3	Park Orchards	11.4 (70)
25 August, Tormore Reserve
4	South Belgrave	8.10 (58)
5	North Ringwood	4.5 (29)

Semi-finals
31 August, Tormore Reserve
1	Surrey Park	8.8 (56)
Park Orchards	8.14 (62)
1 September, Tormore Reserve
Mitcham	5.9 (39)
South Belgrave	7.7 (49)

Preliminary final
7 September, Tormore Reserve
Surrey Park	7.9 (51)
South Belgrave	7.7 (49)

Grand final
14 September, Tormore Reserve
Park Orchards	1.5 (11)
Surrey Park	2.4 (16)

2024 EFNL Men's Division 1 U19.5 Grand Final
Saturday, 14 September (9:45am)	Park Orchards	v	Surrey Park	Tormore Reserve
0.0 (0); 1.2 (8); 1.3 (9); 1.5 (11)	Q1; Q2; Q3; Final	2.2 (14); 2.2 (14); 2.3 (15); 2.4 (16)	Best on Ground Medal: Jonathan Rogers (Surrey Park); Television broadcast: YouTube

== Division 2 ==
2024 Division 2 season
- Date: 5 April - 15 September 2024
- Teams: 10 (Note: Boronia, Ringwood and Templestowe did not field U19.5 teams.)
- Premiers: Seniors; Boronia (4th third division premiership); Reserves; East Burwood (2nd third division premiership); U19.5; Croydon (1st third division premiership)
- Best and fairest: Edie Medal; Mitch Mellis (31); Boronia; Reserves; Sam Clark (16); Templestowe; Luke Hoogstra (16); Croydon; U19.5; Noah Smith (23); Mulgrave
- Leading goalkicker: Seniors; Josh Begley (50); Boronia; Reserves; Sean Bramstedt (46); Boronia; U19.5; Noah Andrews (41); Mulgrave

=== Seniors ===
Boronia won the third division premiership for the 4th time, and their 7th overall since becoming a founding member of the league in 1962. They defeated Croydon by 63 points in the grand final to go back-to-back in Division 2. (Note: Due to a league restructuring, Boronia did not go up to Division 1 the previous year, despite winning the 2023 Division 2 premiership.) With this victory, Boronia were promoted to Division 1 for 2025, returning to the second tier for the first time since 2005.

The Basin went winless, finished last and were subsequently relegated to Division 3 for 2025 after an 11-season stint in the third tier.

==== Ladder ====
Pos	Team	Pld	W	L	D	PF	PA	%	Pts	Qualification
1	Boronia (P)	18	17	1	0	1918	757	253.4	68	Finals series
2	Waverley Blues	18	12	6	0	1276	1136	112.3	48	Finals series
3	Mulgrave	18	12	6	0	1236	1232	100.3	48	Finals series
4	Croydon	18	11	7	0	1193	949	125.7	44	Finals series
5	Templestowe	18	9	9	0	1193	1070	111.5	36	Finals series
6	Ringwood	18	9	9	0	1080	1050	102.9	36	
7	Heathmont	18	7	11	0	994	1082	91.9	28	
8	East Burwood	18	7	11	0	930	1259	73.9	28	
9	Lilydale	18	6	12	0	972	1386	70.1	24	
10	The Basin (R)	18	0	18	0	779	1650	47.2	0	Relegation to Division 3

Rules for classification: 1) points; 2) percentage; 3) points for
(P) Premiers; (R) Relegated

==== Finals series ====
Qualifying and elimination finals
24 August, Walker Park
2	Waverley Blues	12.18 (90)
3	Mulgrave	17.6 (108)
25 August, Walker Park
4	Croydon	13.10 (88)
5	Templestowe	6.12 (48)

Semi-finals
31 August, Walker Park
1	Boronia	9.16 (70)
Mulgrave	4.12 (36)
1 September, Walker Park
Waverley Blues	10.7 (67)
Croydon	10.10 (70)

Preliminary final
8 September, Walker Park
Mulgrave	9.6 (60)
Croydon	12.7 (79)

Grand final
15 September, Walker Park
Boronia	13.14 (92)
Croydon	4.5 (29)

2024 EFNL Men's Division 2 Grand Final
Sunday, 15 September (2:20pm)	Boronia	v	Croydon	Walker Park	Report
4.2 (26); 7.5 (47); 8.10 (58); 13.14 (92)	Q1; Q2; Q3; Final	1.0 (6); 1.1 (7); 3.4 (22); 4.5 (29)	Les Leete Medal: Josh Begley (Boronia); Television broadcast: YouTube
Robertson 5, Begley 4, White 2, D Dower, Collins	Goals	Christie, Dodd, Ficorilli, Thompson
Begley, Robertson, Duke, D Dower, White, Mellis	Best	Nicholas, Ficorilli, Christie, F Smith, Mutsaers, Britton

=== Reserves ===
==== Ladder ====
Pos	Team	Pld	W	L	D	PF	PA	%	Pts	Qualification
1	Croydon	18	15	1	2	1196	522	229.1	64	Finals series
2	Boronia	18	15	2	1	1565	564	277.5	62	Finals series
3	East Burwood (P)	18	13	5	0	1035	675	153.3	52	Finals series
4	Mulgrave	18	12	6	0	1113	790	140.9	48	Finals series
5	Templestowe	18	11	6	1	951	806	118.0	46	Finals series
6	Lilydale	18	7	11	0	749	1043	71.8	28	
7	The Basin	18	6	12	0	804	966	83.2	24	
8	Heathmont	18	4	13	1	618	1129	54.7	18	
9	Ringwood	18	3	15	0	611	1256	48.7	12	
10	Waverley Blues	18	1	16	1	506	1397	36.2	6	

Rules for classification: 1) points; 2) percentage; 3) points for
(P) Premiers

==== Finals series ====
Qualifying and elimination finals
24 August, Walker Park
2	Boronia	4.4 (28)
3	East Burwood	9.7 (61)
25 August, Walker Park
4	Mulgrave	21.3 (129)
5	Templestowe	8.4 (52)

Semi-finals
31 August, Walker Park
1	Croydon	9.4 (58)
East Burwood	8.5 (53)
1 September, Walker Park
Boronia	14.12 (96)
Mulgrave	5.4 (34)

Preliminary final
8 September, Walker Park
East Burwood	9.6 (60)
Boronia	5.8 (38)

Grand final
15 September, Walker Park
Croydon	3.5 (23)
East Burwood	10.11 (71)

2024 EFNL Men's Division 2 Reserves Grand Final
Sunday, 15 September (12:05pm)	Croydon	v	East Burwood	Walker Park
0.0 (0); 0.0 (0); 3.1 (19); 3.5 (23)	Q1; Q2; Q3; Final	1.2 (8); 6.3 (39); 8.7 (55); 10.11 (71)	Best on Ground Award: Ed McCutchan (East Burwood); Television broadcast: YouTube
Alexio, Davies, C Spurrell	Goals	McCutchan 2, Ross-Stubbs 2, Bridges, Connellan, Logan, Oppy, Reddy, White
Hoogstra, Clark, Alexio, C Spurrell, T Anderson, Lemon	Best	McCutchan, Powell, Logan, Pearson, Connellan, Mulqueen

=== U19.5 ===
==== Ladder ====
Pos	Team	Pld	W	L	D	F	PF	PA	%	Pts	Qualification
1	Mulgrave	16	16	0	0	0	1364	646	211.2	64	Finals series
2	Croydon (P)	16	12	4	0	0	1014	595	170.4	48	Finals series
3	East Burwood	16	8	8	0	0	795	702	113.3	32	Finals series
4	Waverley Blues	16	7	9	0	0	832	923	90.1	28	Finals series
5	Lilydale	16	6	10	0	0	714	899	79.4	24	Finals series
6	Heathmont	16	4	11	0	1	679	1172	57.9	16	
7	The Basin	16	3	13	0	0	749	1210	61.9	12	

Rules for classification: 1) points; 2) percentage; 3) points for
(P) Premiers

==== Finals series ====
Qualifying and elimination finals
24 August, Walker Park
2	Croydon	14.6 (90)
3	East Burwood	5.10 (40)
25 August, Walker Park
4	Waverley Blues	11.14 (80)
5	Lilydale	5.13 (43)

Semi-finals
31 August, Walker Park
1	Mulgrave	5.6 (36)
Croydon	6.8 (44)
1 September, Walker Park
Eat Burwood	5.6 (36)
Waverley Blues	9.10 (64)

Preliminary final
8 September, Walker Park
Mulgrave	6.6 (42)
Waverley Blues	12.12 (84)

Grand final
15 September, Walker Park
Croydon	8.7 (55)
Waverley Blues	5.6 (36)

2024 EFNL Men's Division 2 U19.5 Grand Final
Sunday, 15 September (9:45am)	Croydon	v	Waverley Blues	Walker Park
2.2 (14); 4.4 (28); 5.5 (35); 8.7 (55)	Q1; Q2; Q3; Final	2.1 (13); 2.2 (14); 3.5 (23); 5.6 (36)	Best on Ground Award: Blake Podesta (Croydon); Television broadcast: YouTube
Podesta 3, Gionfriddo, McHenry, R Nunziante, Steer, Woodworth	Goals	Tenace 2, Fuller, Hobson, Wade
Roach, Lovell, Podesta, Tartaglia, R Nunziante	Best	Savedra, Daniel, Loft, Pawsey, Fuller, Wade

== Division 3 ==
2024 Division 3 season
- Date: 6 April - 7 September 2024
- Teams: 10 (Note: Fairpark, Oakleigh District and Silvan did not field U19.5 teams.)
- Premiers: Seniors; Surrey Park (1st fourth division premiership); Reserves; Donvale (2nd fourth division premiership); U19.5; Upper Ferntree Gully (1st fourth division premiership)
- Best and fairest: James Medal; James Rausa (32); Donvale; Reserves; Ben Ward (15); Upper Ferntree Gully; U19.5; Luke Marriner (23); Donvale
- Leading goalkicker: Seniors; Darcy Fritsch (91); Coldstream; Reserves; Brett Holst (38); Knox; U19.5; Luke Marriner (72); Donvale

=== Seniors ===
Surrey Park won the fourth division premiership for the 1st time, and their 2nd overall since joining the EFNL in 2002. They defeated minor premiers Donvale by 2 points in the grand final to go back-to-back. With this victory, Surrey Park achieved back-to-back promotion into Division 2 for 2025, entering the third tier for the first time in their history.

Warrandyte finished last and were subsequently relegated to Division 4 for 2025 after a 5-season stint in the fourth tier. (Note: Warrandyte spent 8 consecutive seasons in Division 3 - however, after a league restructuring in 2019, Division 3 became the fourth tier.)

==== Ladder ====
Pos	Team	Pld	W	L	D	PF	PA	%	Pts	Qualification
1	Donvale	18	17	1	0	1886	1081	174.5	68	Finals series
2	Surrey Park (P)	18	15	3	0	1697	934	181.7	60	Finals series
3	Knox	18	13	5	0	1642	1052	154.4	52	Finals series
4	Coldstream	18	12	6	0	1490	1144	130.2	48	Finals series
5	Oakleigh District	18	8	10	0	1311	1520	86.3	32	Finals series
6	Upper Ferntree Gully	18	6	12	0	1197	1411	84.8	24	
7	Fairpark	18	6	12	0	1082	1290	83.9	24	
8	Ferntree Gully	18	6	12	0	995	1267	78.5	24	
9	Silvan	18	5	13	0	1217	1747	69.7	20	
10	Warrandyte (R)	18	2	16	0	857	1910	44.9	8	Relegation to Division 4

Rules for classification: 1) points; 2) percentage; 3) points for
(P) Premiers; (R) Relegated

==== Finals series ====
Qualifying and elimination finals
17 August, Jubilee Park
2	Surrey Park	11.15 (81)
3	Knox	8.6 (54)
18 August, Jubilee Park
4	Coldstream	17.10 (112)
5	Oakleigh District	5.8 (38)

Semi-finals
24 August, Jubilee Park
1	Donvale	11.10 (76)
Surrey Park	10.12 (72)
25 August, Jubilee Park
Knox	18.6 (114)
Coldstream	6.16 (52)

Preliminary final
31 August, Jubilee Park
Surrey Park	9.15 (69)
Knox	1.16 (22)

Grand final
7 September, Jubilee Park
Donvale	12.10 (82)
Surrey Park	12.12 (84)

2024 EFNL Men's Division 3 Grand Final
Saturday, 7 September (2:20pm)	Donvale	v	Surrey Park	Jubilee Park	Report
5.3 (33); 7.8 (50); 9.9 (63); 12.10 (82)	Q1; Q2; Q3; Final	3.3 (21); 5.6 (36); 8.10 (58); 12.12 (84)	Frank Bibby Medal: Tom Smith (Surrey Park); Television broadcast: YouTube
Djordevic 4, Duncan 2, Murphy 2, Giles, McCormack, Rausa, C Tout	Goals	Vitacca 3, Mundy 2, Falahey, Kennedy, Kenworthy, Mahon, Naidu, J Summers, L Summers
Best	Mundy, Smith, Tsatas, Ryan-Simmons, Mahon, Haynes

=== Reserves ===
==== Ladder ====
Pos	Team	Pld	W	L	D	F	PF	PA	%	Pts	Qualification
1	Donvale (P)	18	16	2	0	0	1214	554	219.1	64	Finals series
2	Surrey Park	18	16	2	0	0	1310	655	200.0	64	Finals series
3	Upper Ferntree Gully	18	14	4	0	0	1193	704	169.5	56	Finals series
4	Oakleigh District	18	11	7	0	0	1064	742	143.4	44	Finals series
5	Knox	18	10	7	0	1	973	908	107.2	40	Finals series
6	Ferntree Gully	18	6	12	0	0	776	902	86.0	24	
7	Coldstream	18	5	13	0	0	665	1127	59.0	20	
8	Warrandyte	18	4	14	0	0	720	1136	63.4	16	
9	Fairpark	18	4	14	0	0	647	1087	59.5	16	
10	Silvan	18	4	14	0	0	688	1435	47.9	16	

Rules for classification: 1) points; 2) percentage; 3) points for
(P) Premiers

==== Finals series ====
Qualifying and elimination finals
17 August, Jubilee Park
2	Surrey Park	8.11 (59)
3	Upper Ferntree Gully	6.7 (43)
18 August, Jubilee Park
4	Oakleigh District	6.9 (45)
5	Knox	10.6 (66)

Semi-finals
24 August, Jubilee Park
1	Donvale	4.10 (34)
Surrey Park	8.12 (60)
25 August, Jubilee Park
Upper Ferntree Gully	14.6 (90)
Knox	10.3 (63)

Preliminary final
31 August, Jubilee Park
Donvale	7.13 (55)
Upper Ferntree Gully	4.11 (35)

Grand final
7 September, Jubilee Park
Surrey Park	5.6 (36)
Donvale	5.8 (38)

2024 EFNL Men's Division 3 Reserves Grand Final
Saturday, 7 September (12:05pm)	Surrey Park	v	Donvale	Jubilee Park
0.1 (1); 1.2 (8); 2.2 (14); 5.6 (36)	Q1; Q2; Q3; Final	2.4 (16); 3.4 (22); 5.8 (38); 5.8 (38)	Best on Ground Medal: Kaide Fittolani (Donvale); Television broadcast: YouTube
Steiner 2, Anderson, Doidge, Paolini	Goals	Larder 2, Buckingham, Chancellor, Nash
Lemaire, O’Brien, Steiner, Pollock, Anderson, Gale	Best	McNamara, Fittolani, Nash, Whitbourn, Sinosich, Heveren

=== U19.5 ===
==== Ladder ====
Pos	Team	Pld	W	L	D	F	PF	PA	%	Pts	MR	Qualification
1	Knox	16	13	2	1	0	1331	503	264.6	54	84.4	Finals series
2	Upper Ferntree Gully (P)	15	11	3	1	0	1070	571	187.4	46	76.7	Finals series
3	Ferntree Gully	15	11	4	0	0	1301	627	207.5	44	73.3	Finals series
4	Donvale	16	9	6	1	0	1077	801	134.5	38	59.4	Finals series
5	Surrey Park Reserves	16	5	11	0	0	684	1213	56.4	20	31.3	Finals series
6	Warrandyte	15	3	10	1	1	558	932	59.9	14	23.3	
7	Coldstream	15	0	14	0	1	268	1642	16.3	0	0.0	

Rules for classification: 1) match ratio; 2) won; 3) lost
(P) Premiers

==== Finals series ====
Qualifying and elimination finals
17 August, Jubilee Park
2	Upper Ferntree Gully	8.8 (56)
3	Ferntree Gully	4.8 (32)
18 August, Jubilee Park
4	Donvale	8.8 (56)
5	Surrey Park Reserves	11.9 (75)

Semi-finals
24 August, Jubilee Park
1	Knox	9.14 (68)
Upper Ferntree Gully	11.8 (74)
25 August, Jubilee Park
Ferntree Gully	11.16 (82)
Surrey Park Reserves	5.3 (33)

Preliminary final
31 August, Jubilee Park
Knox	10.11 (71)
Ferntree Gully	9.6 (60)

Grand final
7 September, Jubilee Park
Upper Ferntree Gully	9.9 (63)
Knox	8.6 (54)

2024 EFNL Men's Division 3 U19.5 Grand Final
Saturday, 7 September (9:45am)	Upper Ferntree Gully	v	Knox	Jubilee Park
3.2 (20); 4.6 (30); 7.6 (48); 9.9 (63)	Q1; Q2; Q3; Final	1.1 (7); 3.3 (21); 5.6 (36); 8.6 (54)	Best on Ground Medal: Braidyn Wilson (Upper Ferntree Gully); Television broadcast: YouTube
Scott 2, Smith 2, Bro Wilson 2, Gaal, Ba McDonald, Br McDonald	Goals	Edwards 3, Crosby 2, Keyzer, La Fontaine, O’Neill
Bra Wilson, Gaal, MacDonald, Wright, Edmanson, Ba McDonald	Best

== Division 4 ==
2024 Division 4 season
- Date: 6 April - 8 September 2024
- Teams: 7 (Note: 9 teams competed in U19.5; Croydon North MLOC, Forest Hill, Nunawading and Whitehorse Pioneers did not field U19.5 teams and were replaced by Berwick, Blackburn, Ferntree Gully/South Croydon, Mitcham, South Belgrave and Wantirna South.)
- Premiers: Seniors; Scoresby (1st fifth division premiership); Reserves; Scoresby (2nd fifth division premiership); U19.5; Kilsyth (1st fifth division premiership)
- Best and fairest: Jones Medal; Ryan McNay (33); Kilsyth; Reserves; Lachie Eagleton (16); Chirnside Park; Maverick Gleed (16); Whitehorse Pioneers; U19.5; Jeremy Green (18); Kilsyth
- Leading goalkicker: Seniors; Adam Amin (92); Scoresby; Reserves; Luke Dunn (31); Whitehorse Pioneers; U19.5; Josh Jackson (37); Kilsyth

=== Seniors ===
Scoresby won the fifth division premiership for the 1st time, and their 7th overall since becoming a founding member of the league in 1962. They defeated Whitehorse Pioneers by 81 points in the grand final. With this victory, Scoresby were promoted to Division 3 for 2025, returning to the fourth tier for the first time since 2022.

==== Ladder ====
Pos	Team	Pld	W	L	D	PF	PA	%	Pts	Qualification
1	Scoresby (P)	16	13	3	0	1655	786	210.6	52	Finals series
2	Chirnside Park	16	13	3	0	1541	1005	153.3	52	Finals series
3	Whitehorse Pioneers	16	11	5	0	1505	1153	130.5	44	Finals series
4	Kilsyth	16	10	6	0	1320	991	133.2	40	Finals series
5	Croydon North MLOC	16	4	12	0	1073	1350	79.5	16	
6	Forest Hill	16	3	13	0	822	1667	49.3	12	
7	Nunawading	16	2	14	0	867	1831	47.4	8	

Rules for classification: 1) points; 2) percentage; 3) points for
(P) Premiers

==== Finals series ====
Semifinals
24 August, Bayswater Oval
Scoresby	13.16 (94)
Chirnside Park	12.10 (82)
25 August, East Ringwood Reserve
Whitehorse Pioneers	16.10 (106)
Kilsyth	11.10 (76)

Preliminary final
1 September, East Ringwood Reserve
Chirnside Park	7.12 (54)
Whitehorse Pioneers	10.11 (71)

Final
8 September, East Ringwood Reserve
Scoresby	16.13 (109)
Whitehorse Pioneers	3.10 (28)

2024 EFNL Men's Division 4 Grand Final
Sunday, 8 September (2:20pm)	Scoresby	v	Whitehorse Pioneers	East Ringwood Reserve	Report
3.2 (20); 7.4 (46); 13.11 (89); 16.13 (109)	Q1; Q2; Q3; Final	2.4 (16); 3.6 (24); 3.9 (27); 3.10 (28)	Colin Tainton Medal: Mason Storr (Scoresby); Television broadcast: YouTube
A Amin 4, Storr 4, McBean 2, M Amin, Coulthard, Findlay, Firth, Hicks, Plumridge	Goals	Young 2, Horvat
Storr, Hicks, Hehir, Delrayne, Findlay, Kazizada	Best

=== Reserves ===
==== Ladder ====
Pos	Team	Pld	W	L	D	PF	PA	%	Pts	Qualification
1	Scoresby (P)	16	16	0	0	1687	412	409.5	64	Finals series
2	Whitehorse Pioneers Park	16	13	3	0	1350	516	261.6	52	Finals series
3	Chirnside Park	16	10	6	0	1192	664	179.5	40	Finals series
4	Croydon North MLOC	16	9	7	0	1064	708	150.3	36	Finals series
5	Kilsyth	16	5	11	0	730	1090	67.0	20	
6	Forest Hill	16	2	14	0	514	1344	38.2	8	
7	Nunawading	16	1	15	0	291	2094	13.9	4	

Rules for classification: 1) points; 2) percentage; 3) points for
(P) Premiers

==== Finals series ====
Semifinals
24 August, Bayswater Oval
Scoresby	11.11 (77)
Whitehorse Pioneers	3.7 (25)
25 August, East Ringwood Reserve
Chrinside Park	2.6 (18)
Croydon North MLOC	12.9 (81)

Preliminary final
1 September, East Ringwood Reserve
Whitehorse Pioneers	5.7 (37)
Croydon North MLOC	7.7 (49)

Final
8 September, East Ringwood Reserve
Scoresby	7.7 (49)
Croydon North MLOC	5.4 (34)

2024 EFNL Men's Division 4 Reserves Grand Final
Sunday, 8 September (12:05pm)	Scoresby	v	Croydon North MLOC	East Ringwood Reserve
0.2 (2); 2.4 (16); 4.6 (30); 7.7 (49)	Q1; Q2; Q3; Final	1.1 (7); 2.1 (13); 3.2 (20); 5.4 (34)	Best on Ground Medal: Ben Bronsgeest (Scoresby); Television broadcast: YouTube
Bronsgeest 4, Skeet 2, L Anderson	Goals	Hayhurst, Norman, D Panetta, Starling, Villiger
Bronsgeest, Skeet, Lacriarde, Walker, Raymakers, Alabaster	Best	T Holly, Leacy, Bekker, Volk, Stringer, Villiger

=== U19.5 ===
==== Ladder ====
Pos	Team	Pld	W	L	D	F	PF	PA	%	Pts	Qualification
1	Kilsyth (P)	16	16	0	0	0	1498	449	333.6	64	Finals series
2	Blackburn Reserves	16	11	5	0	0	1113	876	127.1	44	Finals series
3	Chirnside Park	16	11	5	0	0	871	756	115.2	44	Finals series
4	South Belgrave Reserves	16	9	7	0	0	730	871	83.8	36	Finals series
5	Scoresby	16	7	9	0	0	872	973	89.6	28	
6	Ferntree Gully Reserves/South Croydon	16	5	10	1	0	747	952	78.5	22	
7	Wantirna South Reserves	16	5	11	0	0	748	1043	71.7	20	
8	Mitcham Reserves	16	4	9	1	2	660	1068	61.8	18	
9	Berwick Reserves	16	3	12	0	1	651	902	72.1	12	

Rules for classification: 1) points; 2) percentage; 3) points for
(P) Premiers

==== Finals series ====
Semifinals
24 August, Bayswater Oval
Kilsyth	10.7 (67)
Blackburn Reserves	8.8 (56)
25 August, East Ringwood Reserve
Chirnside Park	8.7 (55)
South Belgrave Reserves	8.10 (58)

Preliminary final
1 September, East Ringwood Reserve
Blackburn Reserves	11.18 (84)
South Belgrave Reserves	5.4 (34)

Final
8 September, East Ringwood Reserve
Kilsyth	11.10 (76)
Blackburn Reserves	1.5 (11)

2024 EFNL Men's Division 4 U19.5 Grand Final
Sunday, 8 September (9:45am)	Kilsyth	v	Blackburn Reserves	East Ringwood Reserve
2.1 (13); 4.4 (28); 6.7 (43); 11.10 (76)	Q1; Q2; Q3; Final	1.3 (9); 1.3 (9); 1.4 (10); 1.5 (11)	Best on Ground Medal: Robbie Goodman (Kilsyth); Television broadcast: YouTube
B Camden 4, Childs, Clemow, Dove, Goodman, Henderson, Jo Jackson, Van Vegten	Goals	Suidgeest
Goodman, Henderson, Jo Jackson, Dove, Lubbers, Green	Best	McCall, Pronyszyn, Wilson, Baxter, Marini, Garrett

== External sources ==
- 2024 EFNL Annual Report
