= Reporter District Football Association =

- Sport: Australian rules football
- Founded: 1903; 123 years ago
- Folded: 1928; 98 years ago
- Country: Australia

The Reporter District Football Association (RDFA), also known simply simply as the Reporter Football Association (RFA), was an Australian rules football competition based around the Melbourne suburb of Box Hill.

== History ==
The RDFA was formed in 1903 by EFG Hodges, the proprietor of the Reporter newspaper. Six clubs − Bayswater, Box Hill, Canterbury, Ferntree Gully, Mitcham and Ringwood − participated in the inaugural season. Mitcham were the inaugural premiers after defeating Box Hill in the grand final, after both club finished the season with an equal win-loss record.

In 1928, the RDFA was absorbed into the Ringwood District Football League, which eventually became part of the present-day Eastern Football Netball League (EFNL).

The competition was also known as the Box Hill Reporter District Football Association (BHRDFA) or the Box Hill Reporter District Football League (BHRDFL or RDFL).

== Clubs ==
=== Final ===
Club	Colours	Nickname	Home Ground	Former League	Est.	Years in RDFA	RDFA Senior Premierships		Fate
Club	Colours	Nickname	Home Ground	Former League	Est.	Years in RDFA	Total	Years	Fate
Balwyn juniors			Balwyn Park, Balwyn	–	1909	1927	0	-	?
Box Hill Stars (Box Hill 1903-26)		Stars	Whitehorse Reserve, Box Hill	ESJFA	1894	1903-1904, 1908, 1912-1914, 1920-1927	0	-	Moved to VSDFL in 1928
Mitcham		Tricolours	Walker Park, Mitcham	–	1888	1903-1907, 1909-1910, 1913-1927	6	1903, 1904, 1914, 1915, 1919, 1921	Moved to Ringwood District FA in 1928
Ringwood juniors		Magpies	Jubilee Park, Ringwood	–	1899	1927	0	-	Withdrew after 10 rounds
Surrey Hills (Nunawading 1907-10)	(1909)		Surrey Park, Box Hill	MJFA	1887	1907, 1909-1912, 1923-1927	1	1927	Moved to MAFA in 1928
Tunstall			Nunawading Recreation Reserve, Nunawading	–	1927	1927	0	-	Moved to Ringwood District FA in 1928

=== Former ===
Club	Colours	Nickname	Home Ground	Former League	Est.	Years in RDFA	RDFA Senior Premierships		Fate
Club	Colours	Nickname	Home Ground	Former League	Est.	Years in RDFA	Total	Years	Fate
Auburn			Victoria Road Reserve, Hawthorn East	–	1920	1920-1926	2	1925, 1926	Moved to VSDFL in 1927
Balwyn			Balwyn Park, Balwyn	–	1909	1922-1926	0	-	Moved to VSDFL in 1927
Bayswater			Bayswater Park, Bayswater	–	1895	1903	0	-	Entered recess in 1904.
Blackburn		Burners	Morton Park, Blackburn	ESJFA	1890	1907-1925	2	1910, 1922	Recess in 1926. Formed Ringwood District FA in 1927
Burwood	(1909)			–	1904	1904-1905, 1908-1912, 1915-1923	1	1905	Moved to MAFA in 1924
Camberwell	(1909)		Camberwell Sports Ground, Camberwell	ESJFA	1886	1905, 1907-1911	4	1907, 1908, 1909, 1911	Recess in 1912. Re-formed in VJFA in 1913.
Canterbury			Canterbury Sports Ground, Surrey Hills	–	1881	1903-1904, 1915-1924	1	1920	Recess between 1906-14 Moved to VSDFL in 1925
Croydon	(1909)(1919-23)		Croydon Oval, Croydon	YVFA	1906	1909-1911, 1919, 1923	0	-	Played merged with Kilsyth in 1912. Moved to Yarra Valley FA in 1920 and 1924
Croydon-Kilsyth				–	1912	1912	0	-	De-merged into Croydon and Kilsyth
Deepdene			Deepdene Park, Deepdene	–	1911	1911-1912, 1914	0	-	Recess in 1913. Folded after 1914 season
Doncaster			Schramms Reserve, Doncaster	–	1902	1909-1912, 1919, 1921-1922, 1926	0	-	Recess in 1913-18, 1920 and 1923-25. Formed Ringwood District FA in 1927
East Burwood			East Burwood Reserve, East Burwood	–	1910	1911, 1913-1914	0	-	Recess from 1915-24, re-formed in Scoresby District FA in 1925
Ferntree Gully			Wally Tew Reserve, Ferntree Gully	–	1892	1903-1905, 1910-1920, 1923	2	1912, 1913	Unaffiliated between 1906-09. Joined Mountaineer FA in 1921 and 1924.
Kew			Victoria Park, Kew	MJFA	1876	1912-1919	0	-	Moved to VJFA in 19120
Kilsyth (1)			Pinks Reserve, Kilsyth	–	1911	1911, 1913	0	-	Played merged with Croydon in 1912. Folded after 1913 season
Lilydale			Lilydale Recreation Reserve, Lilydale	YVFA	1872	1912	0	-	Moved to Yarra Flats FA in 1913
Ringwood		Magpies	Jubilee Park, Ringwood	–	1899	1903-1904, 1907, 1910-1926	2	1923, 1924	Recess in 1905-06 and 1908-09. Formed Ringwood District FA in 1927
Rose of Camberwell				–	1909	1909	0	-	Disqualified for rough conduct during 1909 season and subsequently folded
Vermont			Vermont Recreation Reserve, Vermont	–	1919	1920-1926	0	-	Formed Ringwood District FA in 1927
Warrandyte		Bloods	Warrandyte Reserve, Warrandyte	–	1906	1907, 1909-1913, 1919-1921	0	-	Recess in 1908 and 1914-18. Moved to Diamond Valley FA in 1922.

== Premierships ==
Year	Premier	Score	Runner-up	Notes
1903	Mitcham	7.3 (45) - 2.9 (21)	Box Hill	No grand final - Mitcham won first place play-off
1904	Mitcham	5.11 (41) - 5.9 (38)	Burwood	No grand final - Mitcham won first place play-off
1905	Burwood		Ferntree Gully	No grand final
1906	RDFA in recess			
1907	Camberwell		Mitcham	No grand final
1908	Camberwell			No grand final
1909	Camberwell			No grand final
1910	Blackburn	6.7 (43) - 1.5 (11)	Camberwell	Sectional finals system introduced
1911	Camberwell	3.14 (32) - 4.6 (30)	Burwood	
1912	Ferntree Gully	6.7 (43) - 5.10 (40)	Burwood	
1913	Ferntree Gully	8.17 (65) - 9.8 (62)	Mitcham	Final four system introduced
1914	Mitcham	8.9 (57) - 4.7 (31)	Kew	
1915	Mitcham	4.11 (35) - 4.6 (30)	Blackburn	
1916-18	RDFA in recess (WWI)			
1919	Mitcham	5.6 (36) - 4.7 (31)	Canterbury	
1920	Canterbury	6.13 (49) - 7.6 (48)	Mitcham	
1921	Mitcham	10.7 (67) - 3.6 (24)	Burwood	
1922	Blackburn	11.6 (72) - 9.11 (65)	Ringwood	
1923	Ringwood	7.11 (53) - 4.9 (33)	Blackburn	
1924	Ringwood	8.8 (56) - 6.9 (45)	Blackburn	
1925	Auburn	12.11 (83) - 3.8 (26)	Blackburn	
1926	Auburn	16.14 (110) - 1.7 (13)	Balwyn	
1927	Surrey Hills	14.12 (96) - 3.3 (21)	Box Hill Stars	
