= Melissa Kuys =

Australian rules footballer (born 1987)

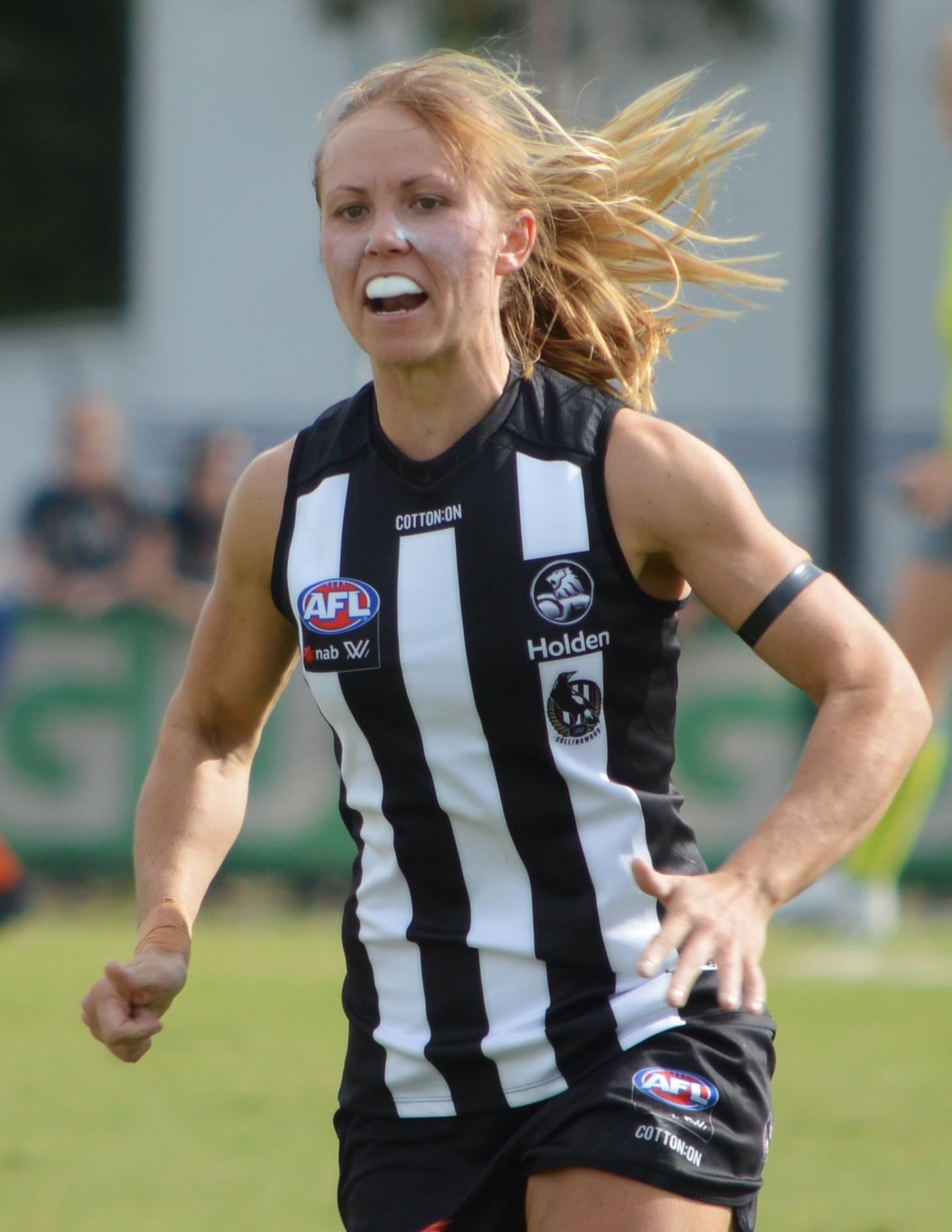
- Kuys playing for Collingwood in February 2018

Personal information
- Full name: Melissa Kuys
- Born: 12 September 1987 (age 39)
- Original team: Knox (VWFL)
- Draft: No. 118, 2016 national draft
- Debut: Round 2, 2017, Collingwood vs. Melbourne, at IKON Park
- Height: 166 cm (5 ft 5 in)
- Position: Ruck rover

Playing career^{1}
Years	Club	Games (Goals)
2017–2019	Collingwood	15 (2)
2020	St Kilda	0 (0)
Total		15 (2)
- ^{1} Playing statistics correct to the end of the 2020 season.

Melissa Kuys (born 9 December 1987) is an Australian rules footballer who played for Collingwood and St Kilda in the AFL Women's (AFLW).

== Early life and state football ==
"It's all about actions, more than words. You're leading by example and you're doing what you want your team to do, they'll follow."

— Kuys speaking in 2017 about her appointment as captain of Box Hill Hawks.

Kuys started playing football at the age of eight, playing in the junior boys' competition with Rowville. She played for the Eastern Lions, Scoresby, and Knoxduring her football journey. In 2016, she captained Knox and won the best and fairest award in a season in which the club only won one game.

Before the inaugural AFLW draft, Kuys was expected to be considered a marquee player by Carlton.

During the off-season between the 2017 and 2018 AFLW seasons, Kuys was selected as the inaugural captain of Box Hill Hawks after they assumed the VFL Women's license of the relegated Knox.

== AFL Women's career ==
=== Collingwood ===
Kuys was selected by Collingwood with pick 118. She made her debut in round 2, 2017, in a match at IKON Park against Melbourne. Collingwood re-signed Kuys for the 2018 season during the trade period in May 2017. Collingwood re-signed Kuys for the 2019 season during the trade period in June 2018. In April 2019, Kuys was delisted by Collingwood.

=== St Kilda ===
At the end of April 2019, Kuys was signed by St Kilda as a delisted free agent. In August 2020, she was delisted by St Kilda.

== Personal life ==
Besides her sports career, Kuys is a chef and runs a catering company.

== Statistics ==
Statistics are correct to the end of the 2019 season.

Legend
G	Goals	K	Kicks	D	Disposals	T	Tackles
B	Behinds	H	Handballs	M	Marks

Season	Team	No.	Games	Totals							Averages (per game)						
Season	Team	No.	Games	G	B	K	H	D	M	T	G	B	K	H	D	M	T
2017	Collingwood	9	6	0	0	47	9	56	13	12	0.0	0.0	7.8	1.5	9.3	2.2	2.0
2018	Collingwood	9	7	2	1	50	15	65	19	14	0.3	0.1	7.1	2.1	9.3	2.7	2.0
2019	Collingwood	9	2	0	0	7	0	7	5	2	0.0	0.0	3.5	0.0	3.5	2.5	1.0
Career			15	2	1	104	24	128	37	28	0.1	0.1	6.9	1.6	8.5	2.5	1.9
