= Dylan Moore (footballer) =

Australian rules footballer (born 1999)

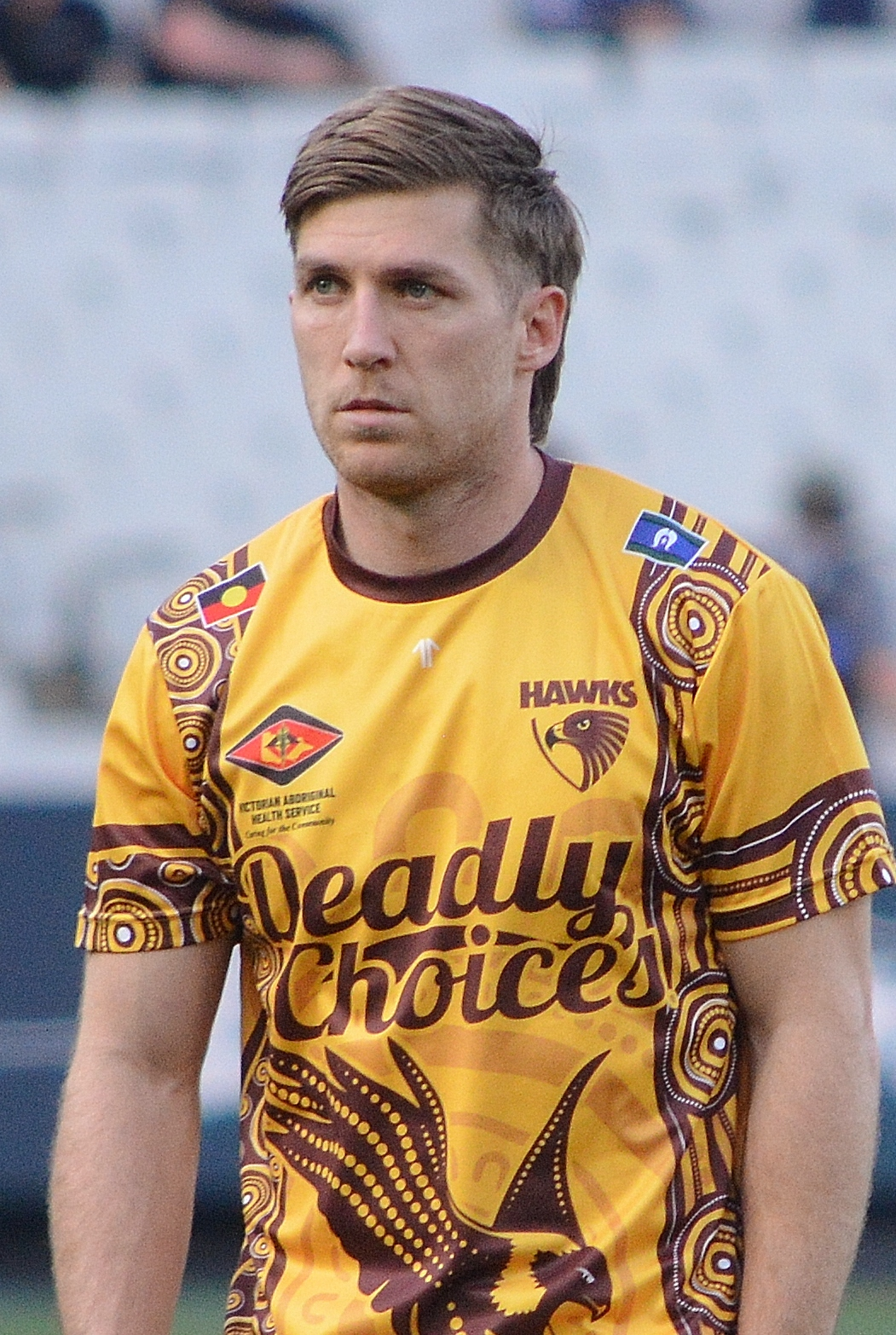
- Moore in May 2026

Personal information
- Full name: Dylan Moore
- Born: 4 August 1999 (age 27)
- Original team: Forest Hill (EFNL)/Rowville (EFNL)/Caulfield Grammar School (APS)/Eastern Ranges (TAC Cup)
- Draft: No. 67, 2017 national draft
- Debut: Round 3, 2019, Hawthorn vs. North Melbourne, at Melbourne Cricket Ground
- Height: 177 cm (5 ft 10 in)
- Weight: 77 kg (170 lb)
- Position: Forward

Club information
- Current club: Hawthorn
- Number: 8

Playing career^{1}
Years	Club	Games (Goals)
2018–	Hawthorn	150 (157)
- ^{1} Playing statistics correct to the end of 2026.

Career highlights
- All-Australian team: 2024; VFL premiership player: 2018

Dylan T. Moore (born 4 August 1999) is a professional Australian rules footballer who plays for the Hawthorn Football Club in the Australian Football League (AFL).

== Early career ==
Moore mixed his football with athletics during his junior career. Moore stated in an interview with the Herald Sun that he participated in athletics in the summer "just to get myself fit for footy in the winter." He took out a state steeplechase title in 2014 and a 1600m event at the Stawell Gift in 2016.

He attended Caulfield Grammar School and won the best and fairest award for the schools First XVIII football side during his draft year. Prior he played community football for Forest Hill Zebras and Rowville Hawks in the Eastern Football League.

Ranked by Champion Data as the 12th best player in the 2017 AFL draft, Moore was selected by the Hawthorn Hawks at selection No.67.

== AFL career ==
He injured his shoulder playing for Box Hill after two VFL games and missed eight weeks of footy. Once fit he returned to the team and progressively got better and better. He played a superb finals series for Box Hill, with four goals in the preliminary final and three goals in the victorious Grand Final.

He made his debut against North Melbourne after the late withdrawal of Jarryd Roughead with injury. Moore played seven games in his debut season.

Dealing with a Covid season, with all Victorian teams in travelling hubs Moore was given three games at the end of the season. In just his tenth game and the last for the 2020 season Moore was awarded a Brownlow vote with 25 disposals and a goal. Following the 2020 season, there was speculation that Moore could be delisted, but the Hawks retained him on the rookie list. In 2021 Moore managed to get through pre-season without any injury, he performed well in pre-season matches prior to the 2021 AFL season, and he was important in Hawthorn's round 1 victory in that year over Essendon, where he kicked three goals. He played in 20 games in 2021 and all senior games in 2022. He started rotating through the midfield as the season progressed. The small crumbing forward has developed into a breakaway midfielder.

After a career best 2024 season which saw Moore kick 36 goals and finish 2nd in the AFL for goal assists, he was awarded his first All-Australian blazer, being named in the forward pocket.

Moore kicked a goal after the final siren to draw the game for Hawthorn against Collingwood in round 8, 2026. Moore had another shot at goal after the final siren to win the game for Hawthorn against Collingwood in round 23, 2026, but it fell short, resulting in the second consecutive draw between the two teams.

== Statistics ==
Updated to the end of 2026.

Legend
G	Goals	K	Kicks	D	Disposals	T	Tackles
B	Behinds	H	Handballs	M	Marks

Season	Team	No.	Games	Totals							Averages (per game)							Votes
Season	Team	No.	Games	G	B	K	H	D	M	T	G	B	K	H	D	M	T	Votes
2019	Hawthorn	36	7	2	2	36	47	83	31	20	0.3	0.3	5.1	6.7	11.9	4.4	2.9	0
2020 (Note: The 2020 season was played with 17 home-and-away matches per team (down from 22) and 16-minute quarters with time on (down from 20-minute quarters with time on) due to the impact of the COVID-19 pandemic.)	Hawthorn	36	3	2	1	18	22	40	14	5	0.7	0.3	6.0	7.3	13.3	4.7	1.7	1
2021	Hawthorn	36	20	27	11	160	147	307	76	58	1.4	0.6	8.0	7.4	15.4	3.8	2.9	0
2022	Hawthorn	13	22	26	14	243	201	444	124	92	1.2	0.6	11.0	9.1	20.2	5.6	4.2	1
2023	Hawthorn	13	23	17	19	254	226	480	107	91	0.7	0.8	11.0	9.8	20.9	4.7	4.0	1
2024	Hawthorn	13	25	36	18	279	208	487	133	99	1.4	0.7	11.2	8.3	19.5	5.3	4.0	9
2025	Hawthorn	13	26	23	17	274	231	505	111	96	0.9	0.7	10.5	8.9	19.4	4.3	3.7	5
2026	Hawthorn	8	24	24	16	226	214	440	106	67	1.0	0.7	9.4	8.9	18.3	4.4	2.8	2
Career			150	157	98	1490	1296	2786	702	528	1.1	0.7	9.9	8.6	18.6	4.7	3.5	19

== Honours and achievements ==
Team

- McClelland Trophy (Hawthorn): 2024
- VFL premiership player (Box Hill): 2018

Individual

- All-Australian team: 2024
