= Donvale Football Club =

Names
- Full name: Donvale Football Club
- Nickname: Magpies

Club details
- Founded: 1971; 55 years ago
- Colours
- Competition: Eastern Football League
- President: John Giles
- Coach: Daniel Michelangeli
- Captain: James Rausa
- Premierships: 14 List: ESCFA: 1972, 1973, 1977, 1988, 1989, 1990, 1991; Eastern Football League: 1992, 1994, 1996, 2001, 2017, 2023, 2026
- Ground: Donvale Reserve

The Donvale Football Club is an Australian rules football club located in Donvale, Victoria. They presently play in Division 2 of the Eastern Football League.

== History ==
The club was founded in 1971 as Donvale United and played in the Eastern Suburban Churches Football Association in the A Grade competition. All clubs had to be aligned to a church. Donvale won their first match on April 17, 1971, defeating Highfield Road by 59 points. They went on make the Grand Final, only to be defeated by Box Hill Pioneers in their first season. But they picked up their first premiership the next year avenging the 1971 loss - thanks to strong tackling, stamina and enthusiasm under the guidance of John Henderson, winning by 48 points. They repeated the performance against the same club in 1973 winning by 30 points thanks partly to inaccuracy by Pioneers. Donvale continued to make the finals and won another premiership in 1977 defeating Burwood United by two points, 108 to 106. In 1979, Donvale were graced with the services of another former Collingwood player, Colin Tully. Henderson and Tully were members of Donvale's team of the decade for the 1970s.

From 1980 to 1984 however, Donvale only made the finals once in 1983, losing the first semi final. But from 1986 they started a golden run when the club dominated the ESCFA by playing off in six consecutive Grand finals and winning the last four over Hampton United, St Kevins Ormond, Burwood United and St Pauls.

In 1992, Donvale United transferred to the Eastern District FL and dropped the "United" from its name. They won the third division flag at their first attempt without losing a game. Promoted to the second division, Donvale only took two years to win another flag and promotion to the first division for the 1995 season.

In 1995, Donvale made the grand final but were beaten convincingly by Vermont. But in 1996 Donvale turned the tables and won yet another premiership over the Eagles.

From there, Donvale struggled and were demoted to the second division after the 2000 season - for the first time since the club's formation. In 2001, they rebounded back into first division defeating Mulgrave in the grand final. But after a grand final appearance in 2005, Donvale were again demoted in 2008 failing to win a game for the season for the first time. They competed in second division until 2013, twice just avoiding further relegation and also avoiding folding up after the 2010 season. In 2014 the club went into recess, before returning to play in the fourth division in 2015. In 2017 they won the division 4 premiership, defeating Forest Hill by 12 points in the grand final and becoming the first club in the history of the league to win at least one senior premiership in all four divisions.

In 2022, Donvale fell agonisingly short of the premiership, losing to Waverley Blues by 2 points in the Grand Final. The 2023 season saw Donvale rebound and win the Division 3 premiership after a dominant 17-win and 1-loss season. They beat Ferntree Gully by 60 points in the Grand Final. Captain James Rausa was named Best on Ground.

2024 saw a dominant home-and-away campaign from Donvale, with a 17-win and 1-loss season, with the only loss being a 5-point defeat to Knox. However, as the finals arrived, their Division 3 rivals, Surrey Park, took the charge to Donvale. The Magpies scraped past the Panthers in the semi-final, but the 2024 Division 3 Grand Final saw Surrey Park come from behind to snatch victory in the last quarter. In the 2025 campaign, Donvale finished top of Division 3 yet again. However, it was another 2-point loss on Grand Final day, this time to Scoresby, marking their third Grand Final loss in four years.

In 2026, Donvale overcame their Grand Final demons to win a convincing Division 3 premiership by 74 points over The Basin at Wally Tew Reserve. The side capped off an incredible run of four-straight minor premierships and five-consecutive grand finals as they moved up to Division 2 in 2027.

=== Seniors ===
Year	Division	Finish	Finals	W	L	Coach	Captain	Best and fairest	Leading goalkicker	Goals
2019	Division 3	5th	-	9	9	Dennet Merton/Brendan McCormack	Karl Toce	Ethan Duncan	Nick Murphy	89
2020	Division 3	(Season canceled due to Covid-19)								
2021	Division 3	3rd	-	7	3	Kevin Collins	Nick Murphy	Kyle Wignell	Nick Murphy	18
2022	Division 3	3rd	Runners-Up	10	6	Kevin Collins	James Rausa	James Rausa	Nick Murphy	48
2023	Division 3	1st	Premiers	17	1	Kevin Collins	James Rausa	James Rausa	Nick Murphy	55
2024	Division 3	1st	Runners-Up	17	1	Kevin Collins	James Rausa	James Rausa	Ethan Duncan	70
2025	Division 3	1st	Runners-Up	15	3	Tony Weeks	James Rausa	Chris Tout	Ethan Duncan	57
2026	Division 3	1st	Premiers	14	2	Daniel Michelangeli	James Rausa	-	Luke Marriner	56

== EFNL Premierships ==
Seniors

- Premier Division - 1 (1996)
- Division 1 - 2 (1994, 2001)
- Division 2 - 1 (1992)
- Division 3 - 2 (2023, 2026)
- Division 4 - 1 (2017)

Reserves

- Premier Division - 0
- Division 1 - 2 (1993, 1994)
- Division 2 - 0
- Division 3 - 4 (2023, 2024, 2025, 2026)
- Division 4 - 0
