= Doncaster East =

Doncaster East may refer to:

- Doncaster East, Victoria, a suburb of Melbourne, Australia
  - Doncaster East Football Club
- Doncaster East and the Isle of Axholme (UK Parliament constituency)
