= Bailey Macdonald =

Australian rules footballer (born 2004)

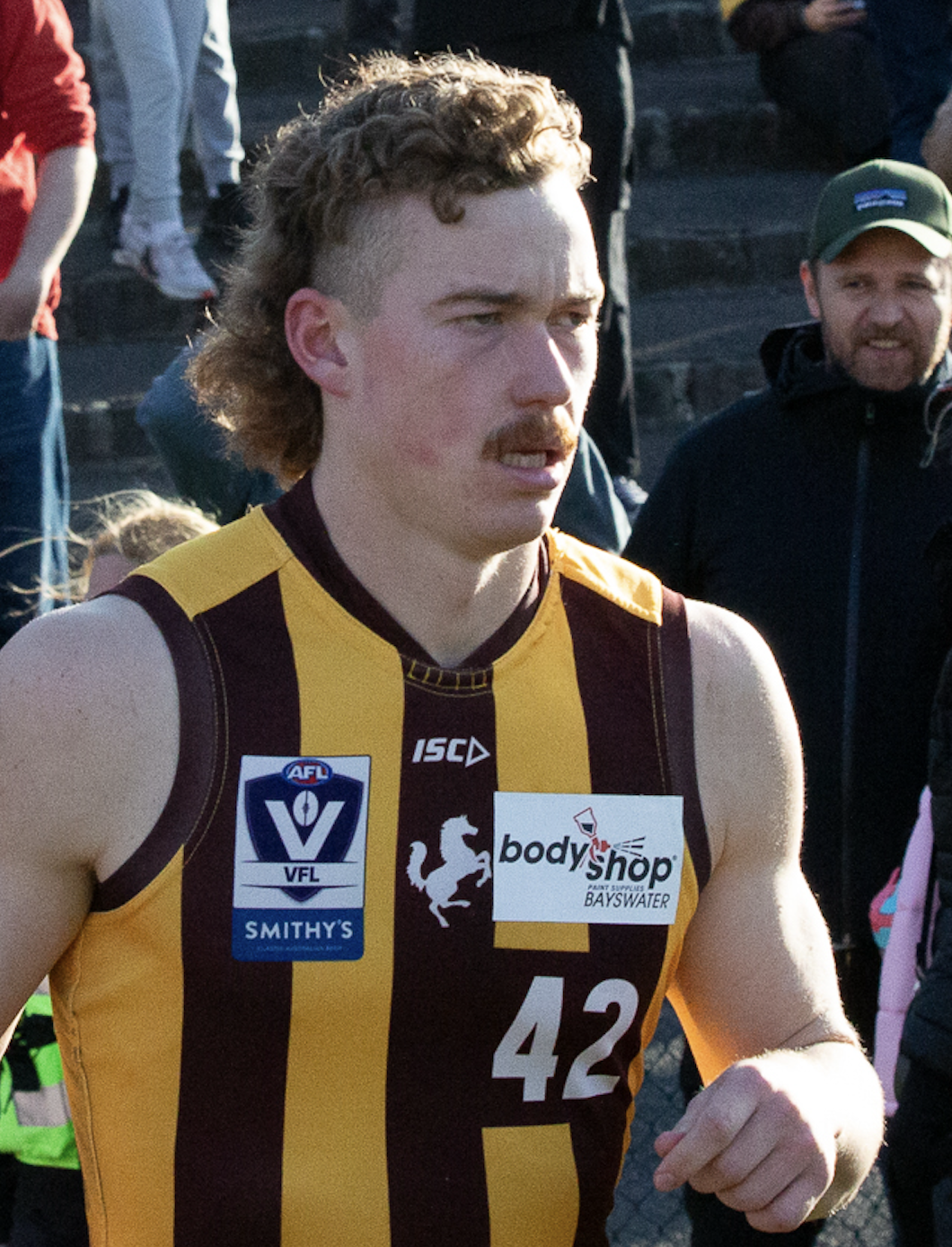
- Macdonald playing for Box Hill in 2024

Personal information
- Full name: Bailey Macdonald
- Born: 4 August 2004 (age 22)
- Original team: Surrey Park (YJFL)/Wesley College (APS)/Oakleigh Chargers (NAB League)
- Draft: No. 51, 2022 AFL draft, Hawthorn
- Debut: Round 12, 2023, Hawthorn vs. Port Adelaide, at Adelaide Oval
- Height: 182 cm (6 ft 0 in)
- Weight: 74 kg (163 lb)
- Position: Defender

Club information
- Current club: Hawthorn
- Number: 42

Playing career^{1}
Years	Club	Games (Goals)
2023–	Hawthorn	22 (1)
- ^{1} Playing statistics correct to the end of 2026.

Bailey Macdonald (born 4 August 2004) is an Australian rules footballer who plays for the Hawthorn Football Club in the Australian Football League (AFL).

== Early career ==
Macdonald grew up in the suburb of Burwood and played junior football for the Surrey Park Panthers in the YJFL, where he was a teammate of Elijah Tsatas.

He impressed enough playing school football at Wesley College to be invited to train with the Oakleigh Chargers mid season. He played four games with the Chargers, earning a Vic Metro selection, and was a part of the team that won the 2022 National Championship.

== AFL career ==
He was the fifty first selection in the 2022 AFL draft by Hawthorn. He has been described as a player with bold dashing runs out of the defensive lines.

After some strong performances for Hawthorn's affliciated club Box Hill Hawks, Macdonald made his debut against Port Adelaide at Adelaide Oval in round 12 2023.

== Statistics ==
Updated to the end of 2026.

Legend
G	Goals	K	Kicks	D	Disposals	T	Tackles
B	Behinds	H	Handballs	M	Marks

Season	Team	No.	Games	Totals							Averages (per game)							Votes
Season	Team	No.	Games	G	B	K	H	D	M	T	G	B	K	H	D	M	T	Votes
2023	Hawthorn	42	2	0	0	13	12	25	11	2	0.0	0.0	6.5	6.0	12.5	5.5	1.0	0
2025	Hawthorn	42	6	1	0	16	16	32	6	4	0.2	0.0	2.7	2.7	5.3	1.0	0.7	0
2026	Hawthorn	42	14	0	1	75	95	170	34	43	0.0	0.1	5.4	6.8	12.1	2.4	3.1	0
Career			22	1	1	104	123	227	51	49	0.1	0.1	4.7	5.6	10.3	2.3	2.2	0
