= Josh Smillie =

Australian rules footballer

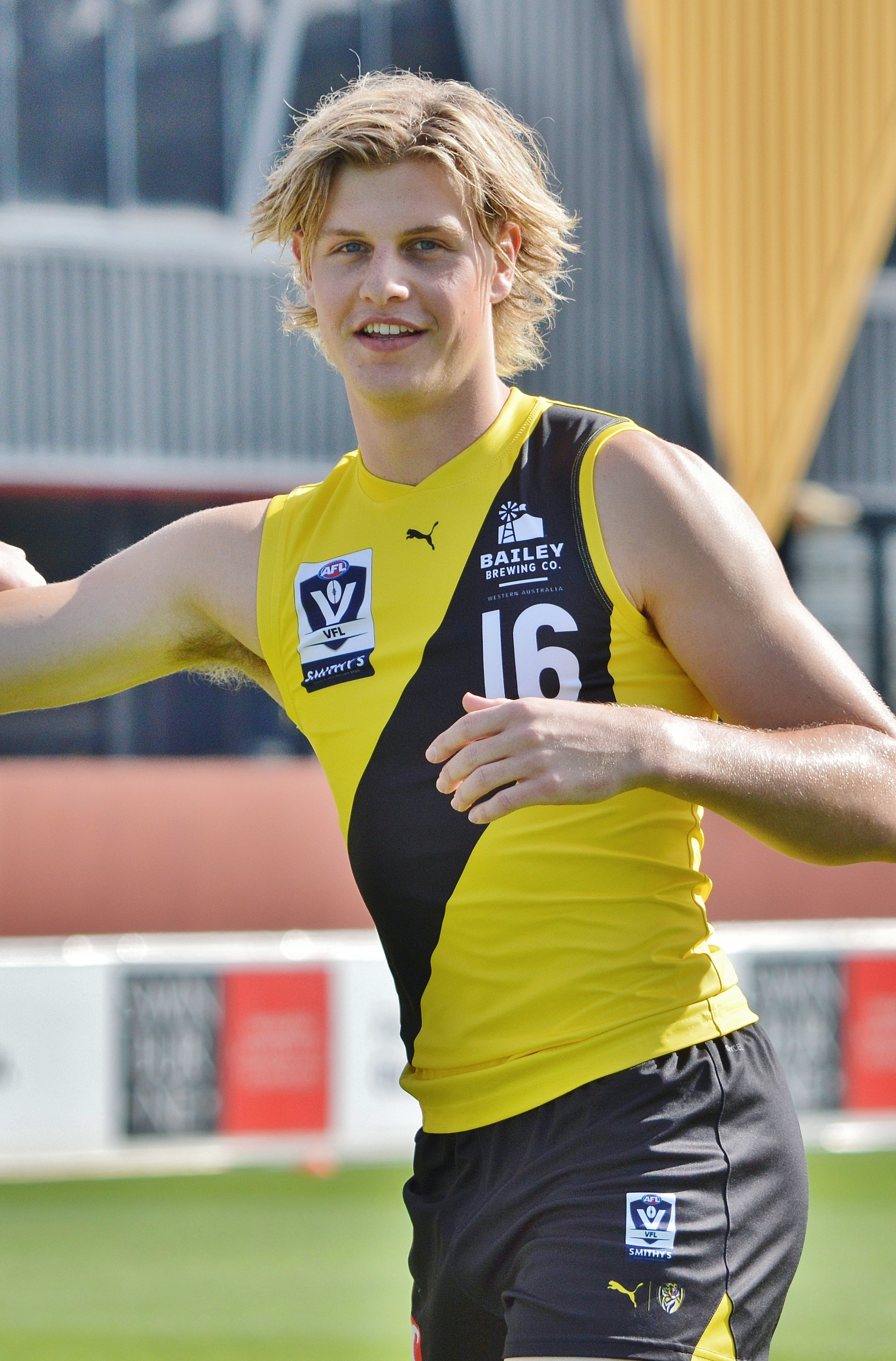
- Smillie with Richmond's VFL side in April 2025

Personal information
- Born: 17 May 2006 (age 20); Victoria
- Original team: Eastern Ranges / Park Orchards Sharks
- Draft: No 7. 2024 AFL draft
- Height / weight: 195cm (6 ft 4 in)
- Position: Midfielder

Club information
- Current club: Richmond
- Number: 16

Playing career^{1}
Years	Club	Games (Goals)
2025–	Richmond	0 (0)
- ^{1} Playing statistics correct to the end of 2026.

Josh Smillie (born 17 May 2006) is an Australian rules footballer who plays for the Richmond Football Club in the Australian Football League (AFL).

Richmond selected Smillie with pick 7 in the 2024 AFL draft alongside seven other rookies. Smillie is a tall midfielder with his key abilities being his athleticism, versatility and kicking.

== Early life ==
Originally from Park Orchards, Smillie played with the Eastern Ranges in the Talent League, where he won the Best and Fairest award in his draft year 2024. He captained the AFL National Academy Team, and played for Victoria Metro.

His father, Bevan, played under-19 football for Essendon and was a Carlton listed senior player but did not play senior AFL football.

== AFL career ==
Smillie was selected by Richmond with the 7th overall pick of the 2024 AFL draft.

During pre-season in January, Smillie sustained a minor hamstring injury in a club internal trial match. Richmond then confirmed in March that he would be unavailable for their opening fixtures as the hamstring "has not healed as well as we would have liked." Smillie returned from this injury via matches in the VFL to try and warrant his spot into the senior side. Smillie suffered a quadriceps injury in early August and was ruled out for the remainder of the season, yet to make his AFL debut.
