= Bayley Fritsch =

Australian rules footballer (born 1996)

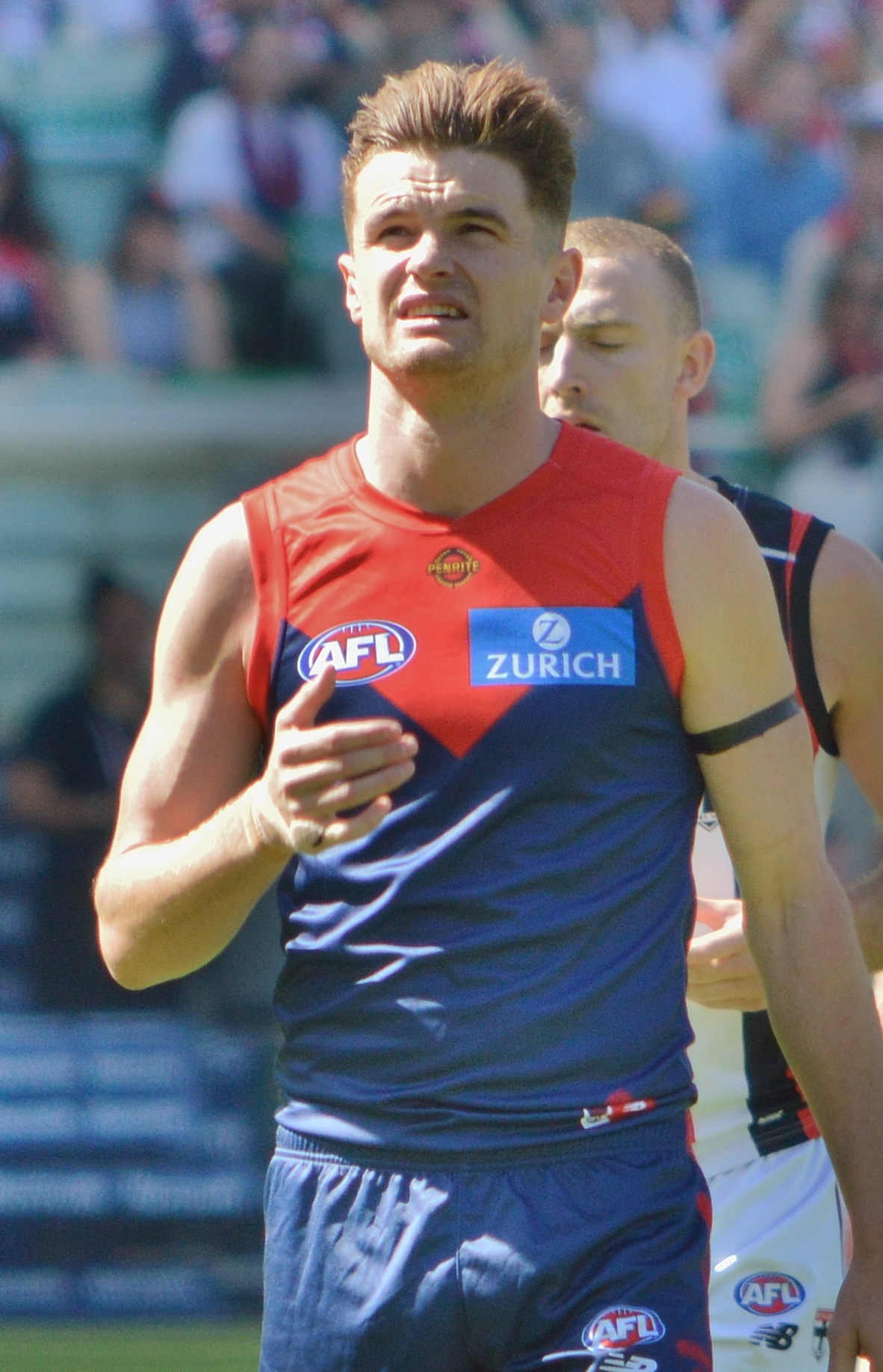
- Fritsch with Melbourne in March 2026

Personal information
- Full name: Bayley Fritsch
- Born: 6 December 1996 (age 29)
- Original team: Casey Demons (VFL)/Coldstream
- Draft: No. 31, 2017 national draft
- Debut: Round 1, 2018, Melbourne vs. Geelong, at MCG
- Height: 188 cm (6 ft 2 in)
- Weight: 84 kg (185 lb)
- Position: Forward

Club information
- Current club: Melbourne
- Number: 31

Playing career^{1}
Years	Club	Games (Goals)
2018–	Melbourne	191 (321)
- ^{1} Playing statistics correct to the end of round 23, 2026.

Career highlights
- AFL premiership player: 2021; 5× Melbourne leading goalkicker: 2020, 2021, 2022, 2023, 2024; Harold Ball Memorial Trophy: 2018; Fothergill–Round–Mitchell Medal: 2017

Bayley Fritsch (born 6 December 1996) is a professional Australian rules footballer playing for the Melbourne Football Club in the Australian Football League (AFL). A forward, 1.88 metres (6 ft 2 in) tall and weighing 84 kilograms (185 lb), Fritsch has the ability to play as both a high marking and small crumbing forward. Considered a late bloomer, he missed out on selection with the Eastern Ranges in the TAC Cup as a junior. After winning the league rising star in the Eastern Football League, he joined the Casey Scorpions in the Victorian Football League (VFL) where he spent three seasons. The 2017 VFL season saw him win the Fothergill–Round Medal, play for Victoria in the state representative match, be named in the VFL Team of the Year, and finish runner-up in the league-leading goalkicker and Casey's best and fairest award. His season saw him drafted by the Melbourne Football Club in the second round of the 2017 AFL draft and he made his AFL debut in the opening round of the 2018 AFL season.

== Early life ==
Fritsch was born to Pauline and Scott Fritsch on 6 December 1996. After missing out on selection with the Eastern Ranges in the TAC Cup, he played twenty-two games from 2013 to 2014 with the Coldstream Football Club seniors in the Eastern Football League, a club which his father played a record 360 games and his grandparents, Dianne and John Jefcott, are life members. At seventeen years of age, he was named the league rising star for division three and four for the 2014 season in which he played twelve games and kicked forty-one goals for the under 19s, and ten games and thirty-two goals for the seniors. He then joined the Casey Scorpions (now known as the Casey Demons) in the Victorian Football League (VFL) at the start of the 2015 season, but experienced two injury-plagued seasons with a back fracture in 2015 and a knee injury in 2016.

Fritsch enjoyed continuity in the 2017 VFL season when he played nineteen matches and kicked forty-two goals for the season to finish as the runner-up in the Jim 'Frosty' Miller Medal as the VFL leading goalkicker. His performances for the first half of the season saw him selected for Victoria in a state representative match against Western Australia and he was named in Victoria's best players by The Leader and The Courier. His first injury-free season at Casey saw him receive the Fothergill–Round Medal as the VFL's best young player and he was named on the half-forward flank in the VFL Team of the Year. Furthermore, he finished second in Casey's best and fairest behind then-Melbourne player, Jack Trengove. Towards the end of the season, he was being touted as a potential AFL draftee when he was one of ten VFL players invited to the Victoria combine, with Casey Demons coach, Justin Plapp, saying Fritsch could become a "serious player" in the AFL if given the chance.

== AFL career ==
Fritsch was recruited by the Melbourne Football Club, Casey's AFL affiliate team, with their second pick and thirty-first overall in the 2017 national draft. A few days after the draft, it was announced his guernsey number would be 31, which was made famous by Australian Football Hall of Fame legend and Melbourne Hall of Fame legend, Ron Barassi, a six-time premiership player with the club. He competed for Melbourne for the first time in the AFLX competition, in which he kicked three goals in the second match with the Herald Sun's Glenn McFarlane writing the early glimpse of Fritsch showed he has strong composure in attack. He played in both of Melbourne's JLT Community Series matches and after the first match, in which he kicked three goals and was the standout player according to Fox Sports Australia's Riley Beveridge, widespread media were noting he was a strong chance to make his AFL debut in round 1. He made his debut in the three point loss to Geelong at the Melbourne Cricket Ground in the opening round of the 2018 season. Fristch played a significant role in Melbourne's 2021 Grand Final premiership win by kicking 6 goals, becoming the first player to kick 6 goals in a Grand Final since Adelaide's Darren Jarman in 1997 and earning himself 10 Norm Smith Medal votes placing him second best on ground.

== Playing style ==
Described as a classy player by The Leader's Paul Amy, Fritsch is a high-marking forward and has a "penetrating left-foot with sure ball handling." With ESPN's Christopher Doerre writing he is untapped and "has the scope to develop into anything," Fox Sport Australia journalist, Riley Beveridge, further stated that he has the ability to add immediate X-factor.

== Statistics ==
Updated to the end of round 22, 2026.

Legend
G	Goals	K	Kicks	D	Disposals	T	Tackles
B	Behinds	H	Handballs	M	Marks

Season	Team	No.	Games	Totals							Averages (per game)							Votes
Season	Team	No.	Games	G	B	K	H	D	M	T	G	B	K	H	D	M	T	Votes
2018	Melbourne	31	23	17	12	236	138	374	121	59	0.7	0.5	10.3	6.0	16.3	5.3	2.6	0
2019	Melbourne	31	22	20	16	246	118	364	132	39	0.9	0.7	11.2	5.4	16.5	6.0	1.8	4
2020 (Note: The 2020 season was played with 17 home-and-away matches per team (down from 22) and 16-minute quarters with time on (down from 20-minute quarters with time on) due to the impact of the COVID-19 pandemic.)	Melbourne	31	16	22	24	128	48	176	81	16	1.4	1.5	8.0	3.0	11.0	5.1	1.0	1
2021^{#}	Melbourne	31	24	59	24	190	54	244	116	47	2.5	1.0	7.9	2.3	10.2	4.8	2.0	3
2022	Melbourne	31	24	55	22	169	60	229	90	37	2.3	0.9	7.0	2.5	9.5	3.8	1.5	0
2023	Melbourne	31	17	38	25	139	52	191	71	27	2.2	1.5	8.2	3.1	11.2	4.2	1.6	4
2024	Melbourne	31	23	41	23	156	63	219	78	27	1.8	1.0	6.8	2.7	9.5	3.4	1.2	4
2025	Melbourne	31	22	36	27	165	111	276	103	41	1.6	1.2	7.5	5.0	12.5	4.7	1.9	0
2026	Melbourne	31	19	29	16	160	83	243	70	43	1.5	0.8	8.4	4.4	12.8	3.7	2.3	0
Career			190	317	189	1589	727	2316	862	336	1.7	1.0	8.4	3.8	12.2	4.5	1.8	16

== Honours and achievements ==
Team

- AFL premiership player (Melbourne): 2021
- McClelland Trophy (Melbourne): 2021

Individual

- 3× Melbourne leading goalkicker: 2020, 2021, 2022
- Harold Ball Memorial Trophy: 2018
- Fothergill–Round–Mitchell Medal: 2017
