= Elijah Tsatas =

Australian footballer

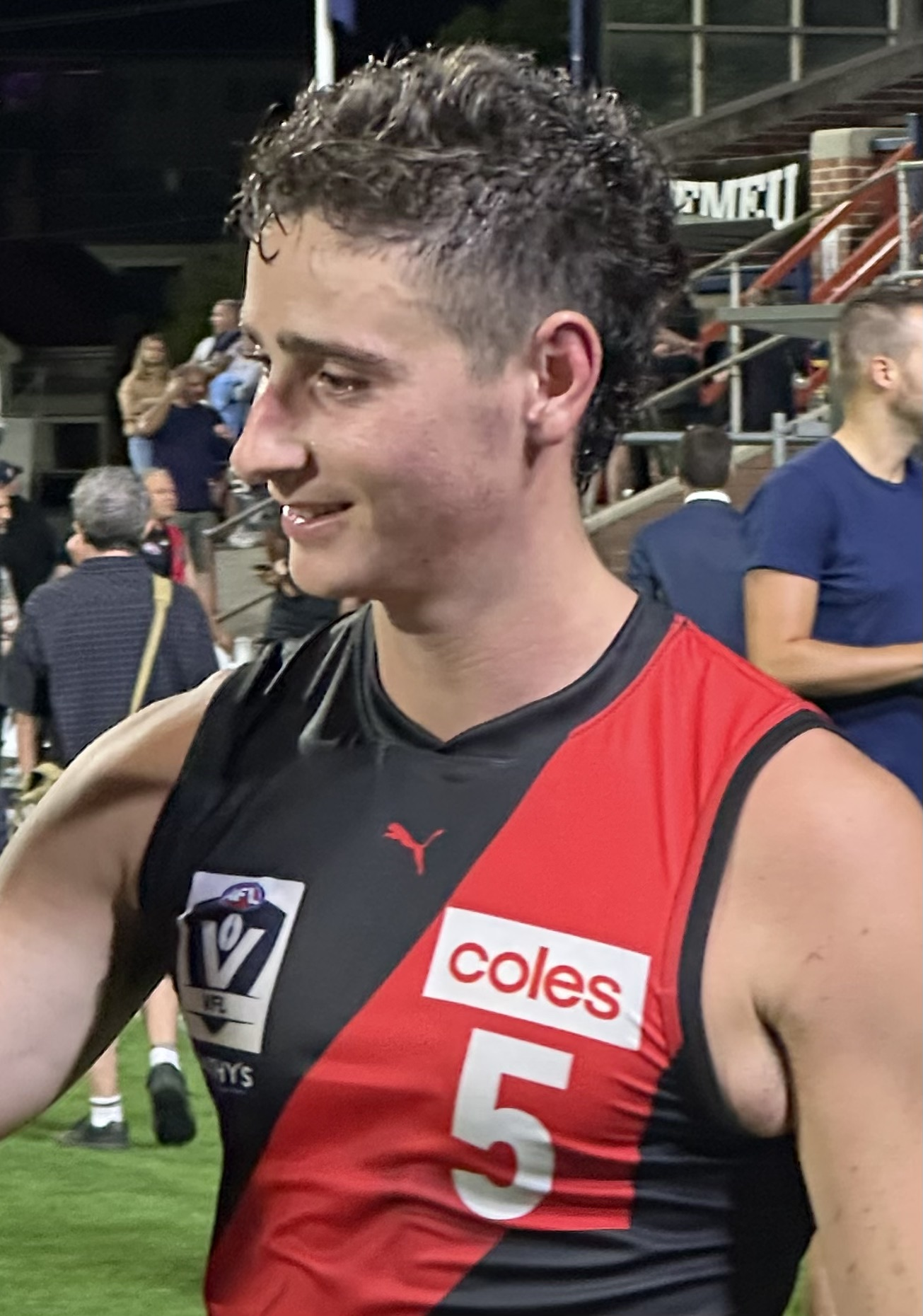
- Tsatas in 2025

Personal information
- Born: 18 October 2004 (age 22)
- Original teams: Surrey Park (YJFL); Wesley College (APS); Oakleigh Chargers (Talent League)
- Draft: No. 5, 2022 national draft
- Height: 187 cm (6 ft 2 in)
- Weight: 80 kg
- Position: Midfielder

Club information
- Current club: North Melbourne

Playing career^{1}
| Years | Club | Games (Goals) |
| 2023–2026 | Essendon | 22 (4) |
| 2027– | North Melbourne | 0 (0) |
| Total | | 22 (4) |
- ^{1} Playing statistics correct to the end of 2026.

Elijah Tsatas (born 18 October 2004) is an Australian footballer who plays for the North Melbourne Football Club in the Australian Football League (AFL). He was drafted by the Essendon Football Club with the fifth pick in the 2022 national draft.

== Early career ==
Tsatas grew up in Burwood and played junior football for Surrey Park Panthers in the YJFL. He also played school football for Wesley College in the APS. Tsatas was teammates with Bailey Macdonald at Surrey Park, Wesley College, and the Oakleigh Chargers.

Essendon reportedly rejected several lucrative trade offers from other clubs in order to secure Tsatas with their top draft pick. Tsatas is friends with fellow 2022 draftee George Wardlaw, with whom he has played football since he was a child. Prior to his drafting, Tsatas suffered a serious foot injury that prevented him from playing for three months. He eventually recovered in time to perform well in games before being interviewed for the draft.

Tsatas is a midfielder-wingman who has been described as a player who "can run and carry, has a knack of finding space at stoppages, and has good disposal".

== AFL career ==
=== Essendon (2023–2026) ===
Tsatas was showing good form in his first preseason with the Essendon Football Club, but then suffered an acute meniscus tear in his knee that required surgery and saw him miss the start of the AFL season. After recovering from the injury, Tsatas made his debut with the Essendon VFL team in round 11, playing 3 quarters and registering a goal with his first kick in the VFL, 18 disposals and 4 marks.

At the conclusion of the 2026 home-and-away season, Tsatas was delisted by the Bombers. The midfielder made 22 senior appearances across four seasons.

=== North Melbourne (2027–present) ===
In November 2026, Tsatas was recruited by the North Melbourne Football Club as a delisted free agent.

== Statistics ==
Updated to the end of round 22, 2026.

Legend
| G | Goals | K | Kicks | D | Disposals | T | Tackles |
| B | Behinds | H | Handballs | M | Marks |

| Season | Team | No. | Games | Totals | | | | | | | Averages (per game) | | | | | | | Votes |
| Season | Team | No. | Games | G | B | K | H | D | M | T | G | B | K | H | D | M | T | Votes |
|---|---|---|---|---|---|---|---|---|---|---|---|---|---|---|---|---|---|---|
| 2023 | Essendon | 5 | 4 | 1 | 2 | 35 | 30 | 65 | 15 | 11 | 0.3 | 0.5 | 8.8 | 7.5 | 16.3 | 3.8 | 2.8 | 0 |
| 2024 | Essendon | 5 | 7 | 1 | 1 | 34 | 37 | 71 | 18 | 5 | 0.1 | 0.1 | 4.9 | 5.3 | 10.1 | 2.6 | 0.7 | 0 |
| 2025 | Essendon | 5 | 5 | 1 | 1 | 40 | 44 | 84 | 5 | 6 | 0.2 | 0.2 | 8.0 | 8.8 | 16.8 | 1.0 | 1.2 | 0 |
| 2026 | Essendon | 5 | 6 | 1 | 1 | 63 | 82 | 145 | 26 | 9 | 0.2 | 0.2 | 10.5 | 13.7 | 24.2 | 4.3 | 1.5 | 0 |
| Career | | | 22 | 4 | 5 | 172 | 193 | 365 | 64 | 31 | 0.2 | 0.2 | 7.8 | 8.8 | 16.6 | 2.9 | 1.4 | 0 |
