= Jordan Ridley =

Australian rules footballer (born 1998)

Personal information
- Full name: Jordan Ridley
- Born: 20 October 1998 (age 28)
- Original team: Oakleigh Chargers (TAC Cup)
- Draft: No. 22, 2016 national draft
- Debut: Round 9, 2018, Essendon vs. Geelong, at Melbourne Cricket Ground
- Height: 195 cm (6 ft 5 in)
- Weight: 94 kg (207 lb)
- Position: Key defender

Club information
- Current club: Geelong
- Number: 8

Playing career^{1}
Years	Club	Games (Goals)
2017–2026	Essendon	111 (2)
2027–	Geelong	0 (0)
Total		111 (2)
- ^{1} Playing statistics correct to the end of the 2026 season.

Career highlights
- Crichton Medal: 2020; Yiooken Medal: 2024

Jordan Ridley (born 20 October 1998) is a professional Australian rules footballer playing for the Geelong Football Club in the Australian Football League (AFL). He previously played for the Essendon Football Club from 2017 to 2026. Ridley won the Crichton Medal in the shortened 2020 season and the Yiooken Medal in 2024.

== AFL career ==
During his draft year he played for Oakleigh Chargers in the TAC Cup and attended Box Hill High School. He previously played community football for East Burwood in the Eastern Football League.

He was selected by Essendon with their second selection and twenty-second overall in the 2016 national draft. He made his senior debut for Essendon against Geelong in round nine of the 2018 season.

After managing just 9 games across his first 3 years with Essendon he enjoyed a breakthrough season in 2020. He played all 17 games of the shortened season earning selection in the All Australian squad and winning the Crichton Medal as Essendon’s Best and Fairest player. After just 26 senior games he became the third least experienced player in the clubs history to win the award.

Following the 2026 AFL season, where Essendon would go on to finish on the bottom of the ladder, Ridley sought a trade out of the club. He was later traded to Geelong in exchange for Jack Bowes, a 2027 first-round selection, and a 2028 second-round selection.

== Statistics ==
Updated to the end of round 22, 2026.

Legend
G	Goals	K	Kicks	D	Disposals	T	Tackles
B	Behinds	H	Handballs	M	Marks

Season	Team	No.	Games	Totals							Averages (per game)							Votes
Season	Team	No.	Games	G	B	K	H	D	M	T	G	B	K	H	D	M	T	Votes
2017	Essendon	14	0	—	—	—	—	—	—	—	—	—	—	—	—	—	—	0
2018	Essendon	14	3	0	0	29	12	41	14	4	0.0	0.0	9.7	4.0	13.7	4.7	1.3	0
2019	Essendon	14	6	0	0	65	24	89	42	11	0.0	0.0	10.8	4.0	14.8	7.0	1.8	0
2020 (Note: The 2020 season was played with 17 home-and-away matches per team (down from 22) and 16-minute quarters with time on (down from 20-minute quarters with time on) due to the impact of the COVID-19 pandemic.)	Essendon	14	17	0	2	211	93	304	110	21	0.0	0.1	12.4	5.5	17.9	6.5	1.2	0
2021	Essendon	14	22	0	0	340	124	464	131	29	0.0	0.0	15.5	5.6	21.1	6.0	1.3	3
2022	Essendon	14	20	0	2	299	83	382	126	21	0.0	0.1	15.0	4.2	19.1	6.3	1.1	1
2023	Essendon	14	17	1	1	259	86	345	126	15	0.1	0.1	15.2	5.1	20.3	7.4	0.9	1
2024	Essendon	14	9	1	0	144	51	195	73	10	0.1	0.0	16.0	5.7	21.7	8.1	1.1	3
2025	Essendon	14	10	0	2	121	49	170	55	6	0.0	0.2	12.1	4.9	17.0	5.5	0.6	0
2026	Essendon	14	7	0	0	72	25	97	42	4	0.0	0.0	10.3	3.6	13.9	6.0	0.6	0
Career			111	2	7	1540	547	2087	719	121	0.0	0.1	13.9	4.9	18.8	6.5	1.1	8
