= Brett Montgomery =

Australian rules footballer, born 1973

Personal information
- Born: 1 June 1973 (age 53)
- Original team: South Croydon(EFL)/Springvale(VFL)
- Debut: Round 2, 5 April 1997, Western Bulldogs vs. Sydney Swans, at Princes Park
- Height: 180 cm (5 ft 11 in)
- Weight: 82 kg (181 lb)

Playing career^{1}
Years	Club	Games (Goals)
1997–1999	Western Bulldogs	60 (54)
2000–2005	Port Adelaide	126 (51)
2006–2007	Western Bulldogs	18 (14)
Total		204 (119)
- ^{1} Playing statistics correct to the end of 2007.

Career highlights
- John Cahill Medal 2000; All-Australian 2002; International Rules series 2002; Port Adelaide premiership side 2004

Brett Montgomery (born 1 June 1973) is a retired Australian rules football player and current assistant coach with the Greater Western Sydney Giants.

== Early life ==
Montgomery, known as "Monty", was originally recruited from South Croydon, and was recruited by Essendon Football Club (U19's & reserves) but was dropped from their list in 1991. Montgomery was also a talented cricketer, and had captained the under-19s Victorian team. In 1992 and 1993 he played club cricket in the Durham League and Middlesex League in England, before returning to Australia to refresh his Australian rules football career. He played with VFL side Springvale, playing in a premiership, then being picked up by Footscray, on their supplementary list. He won their reserves best and fairest, and finally at the end of 1996 was recruited to the Bulldogs' senior list (who had, by the time Montgomery first played in 1997, changed their name to the Western Bulldogs) for his chance to play at AFL level. 'Monty' is married to Terri Montgomery and has four children, Owen, Harper, Louie and Willow Montgomery.

== AFL career ==
=== Western Bulldogs career (1997–1999) ===
He made his AFL debut in Round 2, 1997, beginning his career at the relatively late age of 23. He quickly adapted to AFL level, becoming a consistent and highly skilled half-back or running defender.

=== Port Adelaide career (2000–2005) ===
After 3 seasons at the Bulldogs, he was traded to the Port Adelaide Football Club, where he won the John Cahill Medal in his first season there in 2000. He won All-Australian selection in 2002, also playing in the International Rules series of that year.

Montgomery won a premiership medallion when his team won the 2004 Grand Final to win their first premiership in the AFL, capping off another solid season. In 2005, despite another strong year and finishing 6th in the John Cahill Medal, Montgomery was delisted by Port Adelaide coach Mark Williams, citing a focus on youth in the club's rebuilding phase. But he wasn't keen on retiring. He had only played 9 seasons at the elite level.

=== Western Bulldogs return (2006–2007) ===
The Western Bulldogs, the club he started his AFL career with, picked him up in the 2005 AFL draft, and he became an important player in the 2006 season. In the Elimination Final win against Collingwood, he came back from a hard bump in the opening seconds from Brodie Holland and kicked an important career-best haul of four goals.

As of 2025, Montgomery ranks as the most accurate AFL goalkicker since 2002, with 44 goals from 64 shots, at an accuracy of 68.8% (minimum 50 shots).

== Retirement ==
On 25 May 2007, Montgomery announced his retirement after 204 games. He received a knock to the back area in round 1, 2007, against Geelong and had not played a match since. After being told that his recovery would take 6 to 18 months, he immediately announced his retirement, and has since joined ABC Local Radio as a special comments commentator. After the close of the 2007 season, Montgomery signed as an assistant coach at the Carlton Football Club, where he assumed the role as the defence coach until the end of the 2010 AFL season.

In September 2010, Montgomery made a third return to the Western Bulldogs, this time as an assistant coach, taking over the role vacated by Leon Cameron who defected to the Hawthorn Football Club.

In September 2018, Montgomery returned to the Port Adelaide Football Club as an assistant coach.

== Playing statistics ==
Legend
G	Goals	K	Kicks	D	Disposals	T	Tackles
B	Behinds	H	Handballs	M	Marks
#	Played in that season's premiership team

Season	Team	No.	Games	Totals							Averages (per game)						
Season	Team	No.	Games	G	B	K	H	D	M	T	G	B	K	H	D	M	T
1997	Western Bulldogs	10	16	18	18	139	48	187	79	15	1.1	1.1	8.7	3.0	11.7	4.9	0.9
1998	Western Bulldogs	10	21	22	14	191	128	319	123	32	1.0	0.7	9.1	6.1	15.2	5.9	1.5
1999	Western Bulldogs	10	23	14	8	195	144	339	115	27	0.6	0.3	8.5	6.3	14.7	5.0	1.2
2000	Port Adelaide	3	22	16	15	242	148	390	142	35	0.7	0.7	11.0	6.7	17.7	6.5	1.6
2001	Port Adelaide	3	24	5	7	229	191	420	140	37	0.2	0.3	9.5	8.0	17.5	5.8	1.5
2002	Port Adelaide	3	24	11	1	222	164	386	145	30	0.5	0.0	9.3	6.8	16.1	6.0	1.3
2003	Port Adelaide	3	19	5	2	162	136	298	122	26	0.3	0.1	8.5	7.2	15.7	6.4	1.4
2004^{#}	Port Adelaide	3	14	5	3	123	110	233	85	20	0.4	0.2	8.8	7.9	16.6	6.1	1.4
2005	Port Adelaide	3	23	9	2	208	149	357	159	35	0.4	0.1	9.0	6.5	15.5	6.9	1.5
2006	Western Bulldogs	43	17	14	7	110	90	200	77	23	0.8	0.4	6.5	5.3	11.8	4.5	1.4
2007	Western Bulldogs	43	1	0	0	0	2	2	1	0	0.0	0.0	0.0	2.0	2.0	1.0	0.0
Career			204	119	77	1821	1310	3131	1188	280	0.6	0.4	8.9	6.4	15.3	5.8	1.4
