= Coldstream Football Club =

Australian rules football team

Coldstream
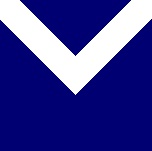
- Full name: Coldstream Football & Netball Club
- Nickname: Cougars
- Founded: 1890
- League: Eastern Football League
- Home ground: Halley Supple, Reserve, Coldstream

Strip
- Blue with white Vee

Coldstream Football & Netball Club, nicknamed the Cougars, is an Australian rules football team. It is based in the Yarra Valley of Melbourne, Victoria, Australia and is part of the Eastern Football League.

== History ==
Founded in 1890 in the town of Coldstream, the club competed in the Yarra Valley Football Association from 1911 to 1914 and then in 1955.

Coldstream and Yarra Glen merged for one season in 1915 prior to World War One.

Admitted into the YDFL Reserves in 1952, they played in the Reserves until 1954.

Coldstream played YVFL Seniors in 1955 & then played in the Croydon-Ferntree Gully Football League from 1956–1961.

Coldstream became one of the founding clubs of the Eastern District Football League in 1962.

The club had to wait until 1975 to achieve their first premiership in Division 3. They again were successful in 1986 and 1990. Their last premiership was in 4th division in 2001.

== Football Premierships ==
Seniors

- Eastern Football League
  - Division Three
    - 1975, 1986, 1990.
- Eastern Football League
  - Division Four
    - 2001

== VFL/AFL players ==
The following footballers commenced their football at Coldstream FC and played senior VFL football or were drafted by an AFL club, with the year indicating their debut AFL season.

- 1962 - Graeme Ellis - Richmond
- 1968 - Jeff Hopgood - North Melbourne
- 1989 - Jason Baldwin - Fitzroy, Richmond
- 1994 - Daniel Hargraves - Western Bulldogs , Fremantle
- 2001 - Lindsay Gilbee - Western Bulldogs
- 2004 - Guy Richards - Collingwood
- 2018 - Bayley Fritsch - Melbourne
