= Kris Barlow =

Australian rules footballer

Personal information
- Born: 15 July 1973 (age 53)
- Original team: Vermont
- Debut: Round 1, 1999, Hawthorn vs. Collingwood, at the MCG
- Height: 188 cm (6 ft 2 in)
- Weight: 91 kg (201 lb)

Playing career^{1}
Years	Club	Games (Goals)
1999–2004	Hawthorn	102 (74)
- ^{1} Playing statistics correct to the end of 2004.

Kris Barlow (born 15 July 1973) is a former Australian rules footballer who played with Hawthorn in the Australian Football League (AFL).

== AFL career ==
Drafted at the age of 25 from Vermont, picked up at 86 in the 1998 National Draft, Barlow was a versatile forward who had great marking ability.

Hampered by wrist injuries, he endured a slow start to his AFL career. A five-goal haul against Collingwood in 2001 showcased the ability Barlow had.

A knee injury in practice match in Morwell at the start of 2004 restricted him to seven matches and he just made it to the 100 game milestone. Barlow was delisted at the end of 2004.

== Statistics ==
Statistics are correct to the end of 2019

Legend
G	Goals	K	Kicks	D	Disposals	T	Tackles
B	Behinds	H	Handballs	M	Marks

Season	Team	No.	Games	Totals							Averages (per game)						
Season	Team	No.	Games	G	B	K	H	D	M	T	G	B	K	H	D	M	T
1999	Hawthorn	33	15	9	5	175	61	236	52	16	0.6	0.3	11.7	4.1	15.7	3.5	1.1
2000	Hawthorn	33	21	11	6	221	73	294	102	37	0.5	0.3	10.5	3.5	14.0	5.0	1.7
2001	Hawthorn	33	19	23	12	204	80	284	94	38	1.2	0.6	10.7	4.2	14.9	5.0	2.0
2002	Hawthorn	33	20	21	13	187	60	247	100	32	1.5	0.7	9.4	3.0	12.4	5.0	1.6
2003	Hawthorn	33	20	9	7	205	106	311	119	41	0.4	0.1	10.2	5.3	15.5	6.0	2.0
2004	Hawthorn	33	7	1	1	48	26	74	25	13	0.1	0.1	6.9	3.7	10.6	3.6	1.9
Career			102	74	44	1040	406	1446	495	177	0.73	0.43	10.20	3.98	14.18	4.85	1.74
