= Percy Ellis (Australian footballer) =

Australian rules footballer, born 1906

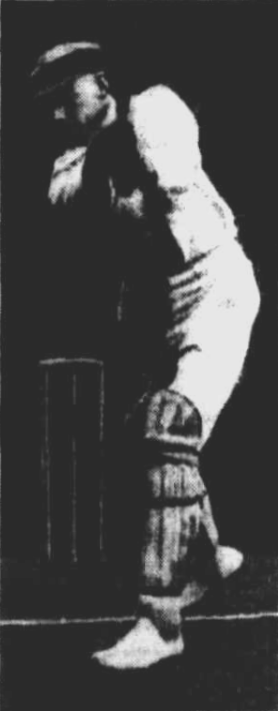

Personal information
- Full name: Percival Arthur Ellis
- Born: 10 May 1906; Abbotsford, Victoria
- Died: 25 April 1992 (aged 85); Lilydale, Victoria
- Original team: Preston
- Position: Half Forward

Playing career^{1}
Years	Club	Games (Goals)
1929–32	Fitzroy	59 (5)
- ^{1} Playing statistics correct to the end of 1932.

Percival Arthur Ellis (10 May 1906 – 25 April 1992) was an Australian rules footballer who played with Fitzroy in the Victorian Football League (VFL) and a cricketer who played three first-class cricket matches for Victoria in 1931.

Percy's son, Graeme played one game for Richmond.

== See also ==
- List of Victoria first-class cricketers
