= Colin Tully =

Australian rules footballer and coach (1945–2020)

Personal information
- Full name: Colin Alexander Tully
- Born: 20 May 1945
- Died: 25 September 2020 (aged 75)
- Original team: South Bendigo
- Height: 179 cm (5 ft 10 in)
- Weight: 73 kg (161 lb)

Playing career^{1}
Years	Club	Games (Goals)
1965–1970	Collingwood	92 (43)
1971-1973	Claremont	53 (32)
Total		145 (76)
- ^{1} Playing statistics correct to the end of 1970.

Colin Alexander Tully (20 May 1945 – 25 September 2020) was an Australian rules footballer who played for Collingwood in the VFL during the late 1960s.

Although small in stature, Tully was a long kick of the ball. For example, he goaled with an estimated 70-75 yards drop kick from the centre of the MCG, against Richmond in 1966.

He played his early football at Collingwood as a centreman before developing into a defender and was a member of two losing VFL Grand Finals. He was a Victorian interstate representative in 1967.

Tully continued his playing career in the WANFL with Claremont and represented the state at the 1972 Perth Carnival. He later became coach of the Glenorchy Football Club, and also played for the Donvale Football Club in 1979.

== Notes ==
- Holmesby, Russell and Main, Jim (2007). The Encyclopedia of AFL Footballers. 7th ed. Melbourne: Bas Publishing.
