= Graeme Ellis =

Australian rules footballer

Personal information
- Full name: Graeme Ellis
- Born: 1 February 1943
- Original team: Coldstream
- Height: 183 cm (6 ft 0 in)
- Weight: 87 kg (192 lb)

Playing career^{1}
| Years | Club | Games (Goals) |
| 1962 | Richmond | 1 (0) |
- ^{1} Playing statistics correct to the end of 1962.

Graeme Ellis (born 1 February 1943) is a former Australian rules footballer who played with Richmond in the Victorian Football League (VFL).

Graeme's father, Percy Ellis, played 59 games with Fitzroy.
