= Park Orchards Football Club =

Australian rules football club

Park Orchards
- Full name: Park Orchards Football Club
- Nicknames: Sharks
- Founded: 1969 (senior team 2012)
- League: Eastern Football League
- Home ground: Domeney Reserve (“Shark Park”, “Shark Tank”)

Strip
- Black, red and white

The Park Orchards Football Club is an Australian rules football club located in Park Orchards, Victoria. They play in Premier Division of the Eastern Football Netball League.

== History ==
The original Park Orchards Junior Football Club was established in 1969 by the then-principal of the local Park Orchards Primary School. The club was based at its current home ground of Domeney Reserve in Knees Road, Park Orchards. In 1991 the Park Orchards Junior Football Club merged with the North Ringwood Parish Junior Football Club, to form the Park Orchards North Ringwood Parish Junior Football Club.

In July 2010 the junior club committee formally voted to establish a senior Park Orchards Football Club, and an application was submitted to join the Eastern Football League. Park Orchards Football Club commenced in Division 4 in 2012 with a senior and reserve teams. They were promoted to 3rd division in 2015 after losing the 2014 4th division grand final.

In 2017 Park Orchards won the 3rd Division premiership by defeating Heathmont by 15 points and the club was promoted to 2nd Division for the 2018 season. In 2019 the league retitled their divisions with 1st Division becoming Premier Division and the lower divisions moving up in order. Park Orchard was now in 1st Division.

2020 was the worldwide Covid pandemic and all football in Victoria was cancelled for the year. When football returned in 2021 they were on top of the ladder when the competition was suspended again.

2022 and the club was promoted to the highest division Premier Division.

== Premiership ==
- 2017 Eastern Football League 3rd Division

== VFL/AFL players ==
- Marcus Allan – Brisbane Lions
- Jackson Archer- North Melbourne
- Dean Bailey – Essendon, Melbourne
- James Blanck - Hawthorn
- Jason Cloke – Collingwood
- Cameron Cloke – Collingwood,Carlton
- Travis Cloke – Collingwood, Western Bulldogs
- Nick Malceski – Sydney, Gold Coast
- Christian Petracca - Melbourne
- Josh Smillie - Richmond
- Cooper Trembath- North Melbourne
