= Kilsyth Football Club =

Names
- Full name: Kilsyth Football Club
- Nickname(s): Cougars, Cougs, Killy
- Former nickname(s): Sythers, Red Robins
- Club song: "We are the Red and Blacks"

Club details
- Founded: 1924; 102 years ago
- Colours: Black Red
- Premierships: 7 (1938, 1950, 1951, 1952, 1975, 1990, 1995)
- Ground: Pinks Reserve
- Former ground: Colchester Rd

Uniforms
Home

The Kilsyth Football Club, nicknamed the Cougars, is an Australian rules football club based in the Melbourne suburb of Kilsyth. The club is most notable for its three-year stint in the Victorian Football Association (VFA) in the 1980s.

Kilsyth's men's team currently plays in Division 4 of the Eastern Football Netball League (EFNL), while the women's team is in Division 2 of the EFNL's women's competition.

== History ==
=== Origins ===
In 1910, the first Kilsyth Football Club was formed, entering the Reporter District Football Association (RDFA) in 1911.

Kilsyth combined with Montrose in 1913, playing its home games on vacant land owned by the Salvation Army. The club appears to have folded in 1914 amid World War I, but returned in 1922 when a combined team was fielded with Bayswater.

In 1923, Kilsyth merged with Montrose in the Yarra Valley Football Association and lost the preliminary final to Healesville.

=== New club ===
In 1924, the present-day Kilsyth Football Club was formally established as a sole entity, purchasing a former orchard on Colchester Road (now known as Kilsyth Recreation Reserve).

From 1927, the Kilsyth 'Sythers' played in the Ringwood District Football League until its demise in 1941 when it then moved to theCroydon-Ferntree Gully Football League which then became the Eastern District Football League which Kilsyth Football Club was a founding member of and played there until 1981.

=== VFA ===
Despite being a small EDFL club and having finished last in the EDFL's second division in 1981, Kilsyth joined the Victorian Football Association second division for the 1982 season as part of the VFA's restructuring and expansion in the early 1980s. The outer north-eastern suburbs were not otherwise represented in the VFA, and Kilsyth hoped that it would be able to attract some of the best local talent out of the EDFL and into its VFA team; but this never happened, and the club endured three seasons in Division 2 with very little success, finishing with a total on-field record of 9 wins and 44 losses.

The club initially still intended to continue in the VFA in 1985, but it withdrew shortly before the season began and returned to the Eastern District Football League, hastily rejoining its 1985 third division competition where it came last.

=== EFNL ===
During the 1997 season the club moved from its Colchester Road ground to play its first match against Knox at Pinks Reserve.

== Club symbols ==
The club's nickname is the Cougars, which is a type of big cat located in North, Central and South American Mountainous areas was the perfect fit for the Outer Eastern suburb team for its location was at the foot of the famous Mt Dandenong Ranges.

The Cougars guernsey is currently black with red sash but had previously worn different colours and types of patterned guernsey's before the World Wars, including a green with white sash and in 1922. Later that year they went back to a green guernsey but this time yellow was added. In 1924 hard times hit and they allowed anyone with a playing guernsey to take the field as did many local sides during that era. 1925 seen the Kilsyth club adopt similar colours and design to that of Footscray. 1946 was the First time the Sythers ran out onto their home ground in the black and red and it was around this stage when they adopted the 'Red Robins' moniker. Around the late 60's it was determined that Cougars was a better fit for the club's image.

In 1983, the club reversed its colours to red with a black sash – partly because of its similarity to the guernsey of VFA Division 1 club Coburg, and partly because the VFA was discouraging its clubs from wearing the same guernsey design as Victorian Football League clubs (Kilsyth's guernsey matched Essendon's). Since 1997, the club has played home matches at Pinks Reserve in Liverpool Road; prior to that, and during its time in the VFA, the club had played at the Kilsyth Recreation Reserve in Colchester.

== Website ==
- Official website
