= South Croydon Football Club =

Names
- Nickname: The Bulldogs

2023 season
- After finals: 6th
- Home-and-away season: 6th of 12
- Leading goalkicker: James Wilsen (50 goals)
- Best and fairest: Brayden Kilpatrick

Club details
- Founded: 1969
- Colours: Red, White, Blue
- Competition: Eastern Football Netball League
- Premierships: Seniors (8): 1973 • 1983 • 1988 • 1991 • 2001 • 2006 • 2009 • 2017
- Ground: Cheong Park

The South Croydon Football Club is an Australian rules football club located in South Croydon, Victoria. They play in Premier Division of the Eastern Football Netball League.

== History ==
The South Croydon Football Club was founded in 1969 and fielded its first senior side in the same year.

The club has won senior premierships in 3rd division of the Eastern Football League in 1973, 2001 and 2006. The club has won senior premierships in 2nd division of the Eastern Football League in 1983, 1988, 1991 and 2009. The club has been in the 1st division of the Eastern Football League since 2010 and won the 2017 1st division premiership, the club's first top flight premiership in history.

== VFL/AFL players ==
- Matt Jones - Melbourne
- Brett Montgomery - Western Bulldogs Port Adelaide Football Club
- Lukas Markovic - Western Bulldogs
- Chris Hollow - St Kilda Football Club
