= Doncaster Football Club =

Doncaster
- Full name: Doncaster Football Club
- Sport: Australian rules football
- Founded: 1902
- League: Eastern Football League
- Premierships: 1972, 1984, 1990, 1996, 2011, 2013

Strip
- Blue and White hoops

The Doncaster District Football Club is a semi-professional Australian rules football club in the eastern suburbs of Melbourne. The club participates in the Eastern Football League.

== History ==
Formed in 1902 the club joined the Reporter District Football Association in 1909. Success didn't come until the late 1920s when they won four premiers in five years.

Doncaster was one of the founding clubs of the Eastern Districts Football League in 1962, this league came about be the transfer of clubs from the Croydon-Ferntree Gully Football League and the Eastern Suburbs.

== Senior Premierships ==
- Reporter District Football Association – 1909 to 1926
- Ringwood District Football Association – 1927 to 1937
  - 1927 – Doncaster 8-13-61 d Blackburn 5- 8-38
  - 1928 – Doncaster d Blackburn (won on protest, Blackburn played suspended player.)
  - 1929 – Doncaster 13-10- 88 d Mitcham 11-11-77
  - 1931 – Doncaster 20-14-134 d Ringwood 13-14-92
  - 1936 – Doncaster 15-15-105 d Ringwood 11-21-87
- Eastern Suburbs Football League – 1938 to 1961
  - 1939 – Doncaster 14-14-98 d Mitcham 14-10-94
- Eastern Football League – 1962 onwards
  - 1972 – Doncaster 17-15-117 d Bayswater 11-14-80
  - 1984 – Doncaster 11-21-87 d Boronia 8-5-53
  - 1990 – Doncaster 17-11-113 d Mooroolbark 10-9-69
  - 1996 – Doncaster 16- 5-101 d Templestowe 6- 7-43
  - 2011 – Doncaster 14-19-103 d North Ringwood 5-8-38
  - 2013 – Doncaster 25-11-161 d Wantirna South 15-12-102

== See also ==
- Australian Football League
