= Doncaster East Football Club =

Australian rules football club

Names
- Nickname(s): The Mighty Lions

Club details
- Founded: 1972
- Colours
- Competition: Eastern Football Netball League
- Coach: Ryan James
- Premierships: Seniors (4): 1993 • 2007 • 2018 • 2019 Reserves (3): 1994 • 2004 • 2005 Under 19's (3): 1983 • 1999 • 2012
- Ground(s): Zerbes Reserves

The Doncaster East Football Club is an Australian rules football club located in Doncaster East, Victoria with resident home ground at Zerbes Reserve.

== History ==
Club formed in 1972 as the Beverley Hills Football Club and affiliated in the VAFA. In 1982 the club transferred to the Eastern Districts Football League. In 1989 the club altered its name to Doncaster East Football Club.

As at the end of the 1992 season the Eastern Suburban Churches FA moved into recess, Doncaster East was able to absorb the now in recess Wattle Park FC and with the influx of its players allowed the club to win the 1993 fourth division grand final.

After winning the Division three Under 18 Premiership in 1999 a new generation of Doncaster East players set the foundation for future success, claiming the club's second major silverware winning the 2007 division three grand final.

After finishing runners up in 2017, Doncaster East rallied for an impressive Back to Back Premiership campaign in 2018 & 2019 elevating the club to Premier Division in 2020.

== Premierships ==
- 1993, 2007, 2018, 2019.

== VFL/AFL players ==
Paul Roos - Fitzroy FC, Sydney FC

Simon White - Carlton FC

Sam Rowe - Carlton FC, StKilda FC

Maverick Weller - StKilda FC, Richmond FC

Zach Clarke - Fremantle Dockers, Essendon FC

Stephen Gilham - Hawthorn FC, Greater Western Sydney FC

Blake Hardwick - Hawthorn FC

Mitchell Craig - Melbourne FC

== Eastern Football Netball League ==
EFNL Premier Division League

Senior coach - Steve Buckle

Club President - Peter Sowersby
