= Knox Football Club =

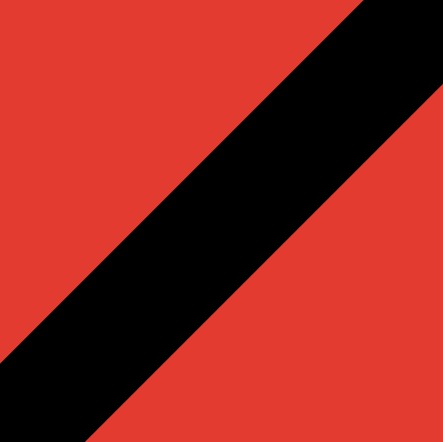

Names
- Full name: Knox Football Club
- Former name: Knox Baptists Football Club
- Nickname: Falcons

Club details
- Founded: 1980
- Colours: Black Red
- Competition: Eastern Football Netball League
- Premierships: EFNL (4): 1991 (Div 4); 2000 (Div 3); 2007 (Div 2); 2017 (Div 2)

The Knox Football Club, nicknamed the Falcons, is an Australian rules football club based in Wantirna South, Victoria. The club currently competes in Division 3 of the Eastern Football Netball League.

== History ==
In 1980, the Knox Baptists Football Club (then nicknamed the Hawks) was founded and played in the Eastern Suburban Churches Football Association. To affiliation for the ESCFA, the club had to have the backing of a local church. The club dropped "Baptist" from their name in 1985.

In 1989, the club decided to join the Eastern District Football League. The change of leagues meant the club had to change its colours, replacing brown and gold with red and black.

Knox won its first senior premiership in 1991, defeating Heathmont 13.11.(89) to 10.10 (70) in the Division 4 Grand Final.

The club won the 2007 Division 2 Grand Final by six points, defeating South Croydon 18.16 (124) to 18.10 (118). As a result, they entered Division 1 for the first time.

== Controversies ==
In May 2023, male players from Knox's reserves team attended a women's EFNL game between Knox and Donvale. As the Donvale players ran out at half time, the male players rated and attempted to trip over Donvale players.

On 16 May, the club announced the entire Knox reserves team would be stood down pending the outcome of an independent investigation.
