= Forest Hill Football Club =

Forest Hill
- Full name: Forest Hill Football Netball Club
- Nickname: Zebras
- Founded: 1967
- League: Eastern Football League
- Home ground: Forest Hill Reserve

Strip
- Green and white strips

The Forest Hill Football Club is an Australian rules football club located in Forest Hill, Victoria. They play in Division 4 of the Eastern Football League.

== History ==
The club was founded in 1967 as under aged club that developed young boys in footballers. By 1970 there was enough support for the fielding of a senior side in the Eastern Football League. The club spent its first seven years down the bottom of the 3rd Division ladder.

In 1978 the club played finals for the first time. Yearly improvements and finals until the breakthrough in 1984 when the club won its only premiership in defeating The Basin by 32 points.

The club spent six years toiling in the 2nd Division but was demoted and gaining the wooden spoon in 1990. Relegated down the 3rd Division, a lower grade, the club's performances slowly slid until demotion to 4th division in 1998.

The club hit rock bottom with back to back wooden spoons in 2002-03 but since then their performances have improved to be regular finalist in the last couple of years.

In 2016 Matthew Carnelley caused a sensation when he kicked 22 goals against Nunawading. Later in the year he kicked 24 goals against the same opposition to set a new league record.
