= Mitcham Football Club =

Australian rules football team in Melbourne

Mitcham
- Full name: Mitcham Football Club
- Nickname: Tigers
- Founded: 1888
- League: Eastern Football League
- Home ground: Walker Park, Mitcham

Strip
- Black with yellow sash

Mitcham Football Club nicknamed the Tigers, is an Australian rules football team. It is based in the eastern suburbs of Melbourne, Victoria, Australia and is part of the Eastern Football League.

== History ==
Mitcham Football Club first appeared in 1886, when they were recorded playing two matches against Lilydale, at Lilydale on August 14 and a return match at Mitcham on August 28 This is two years before their recognised formation date.

The earliest competition that the club played in was for the W. Montgomery Trophy in 1892, where they played against Burwood, Box Hill and Surrey Hills. For 1893 and 1894 Mitcham united with the Box Hill and Surrey Hills clubs to form the Nunawading Football Club (named after the shire district) and competed in the Victorian Junior Football Second-rate (Division) competition. In 1895 the club left the merged entity and again competed as Mitcham.

Mitcham's regular competition history began when the Box Hill Reporter newspaper sponsored a football competition in 1903. Mitcham being a founding club won the first and second premierships. When the Reporter District F.A. lapsed for one season in 1906, Mitcham joined the Eastern Suburbs Junior F.A. that year before re-entering the Reporter competition in 1907 when that competition reformed. After being minor premiers in 1913, they lost the Grand Final to Ferntree Gully, but bounced back to win the flags in 1914 and 1915.

After World War 1 Mitcham again won premierships in 1919 and 1921 while coming runners-up in 1920. After that they began to struggle and finished last in 1924 and 1925. In the final season of the Reporter competition in 1926 Mitcham only just avoided another wooden spoon, finishing one game ahead of Doncaster. In 1927 Mitcham decided against joining the newly formed Ringwood District F.A. and competed for one year in the Reporter District Junior FA, finishing mid table.

Mitcham decided to again compete as a senior club in 1928 and joined the Ringwood District F.A., where they remained until 1937. They lost the 1929 Grand Final, having future South Melbourne champion Bob Pratt in their team, to Doncaster and were again finalists in 1930 before tumbling down the ladder in 1931. In 1932 the club merged with struggling neighbour Vermont to form Mitcham-Vermont and the combined team finished third. Mitcham-Vermont "Combineds" were again third in 1933 after having been minor premiers before finishing low down in 1934. In 1935 Mitcham competed as the Mitcham Stars in the Second Eighteen competition of the Ringwood District FL and won the premiership. They spent another year as a junior club in 1936 before becoming a senior club again in 1937.

Mitcham left to join the Eastern Suburban FL in the 1930s. In 1938 Mitcham joined the Eastern Suburban Football League (which later became the South-East FL and is today known as the Southern Football League). They joined B Grade where they competed until 1941, having been minor premiers in 1939 but missing out on the flag.

When the Eastern Suburban Football League reformed in 1945 after WW2, Mitcham competed in the Eastern Section. In 1946 Mitcham finished minor premiers but lost the Grand Final to Box Hill and also fielded their first 2nd Eighteen (Reserve) Grade team which formed that year. In 1947 the results were reversed and Mitcham claimed the premiership over Box Hill. Mitcham again finished minor premiers in 1948 but went out in straight sets.

By 1955 they had decided to play closer to home and joined the Croydon Ferntree Gully FL. The Croydon-Ferntree Gully FL changed its name to the Eastern District Football League in 1962.

They were a founding club for the Eastern District Football League in 1962. Most of their time has been spend in 2nd division.
