= East Burwood Football Club =

Australian football club

East Burwood
- Full name: East Burwood Football Club
- Nickname: Rams
- Founded: 1910
- League: Eastern Football League
- Home ground: East Burwood Reserve

Strip
- Black with white monogram

The East Burwood Football Club is an Australian rules football club located in East Burwood, Victoria. They play in Division 2 of the Eastern Football League.

== History ==
The club formed in 1910 and began playing in the Box Hill Reporter DFA in 1911. In its early years, the club had a habit of moving from competition to competition: they were a founding member of the Scoresby DFA in 1925 and won the last two premierships in 1929 and 1930, then in 1931, they joined the Federal FL and were premiers in 1932. They left at the end of the 1937 season.

In 1940 the club appeared in the East Suburban FL and played in the "East Section" and then in "B" grade until winning in 1954 as premiers and champions. Promoted to "A" Grade in 1955, they returned to "B" Grade in 1956 before regaining a place in "A" Grade in 1959. In 1960 they won the "A" Grade flag.

East Burwood then joined the Eastern Districts Football League in 1961 where it remains today. Starting in Division 1, it maintained that position for many years, winning premierships in 1963–1965, 1967–1968, 1973, 1976, 1985, 1987, 1992, 1999 and 2000.

Following an exodus of players and financial problems, the club was demoted from Division 1 for the first time after the 2013 season, and played in Division 2 for three seasons before being demoted again.

While they reached the Division 3 preliminary final in 2017, a restructure of the EFL meant that the club would play in the newly formed Division 4 for 2018. After losing the 2019 Division 4 grand final the club was awarded promotion for the 2021 season to Division 3 for outstanding achievement.

== VFL/AFL players ==
- Josh Gibson - North Melbourne, Hawthorn
- Robbie Gray - Port Adelaide
- Andrew Carrazzo - Carlton
- Joel Perry - North Melbourne
- Blake Grima - North Melbourne
- Brad Fisher - Carlton
- Adam White - Carlton
- Jordan Ridley-Essendon Bombers
- Karl Worner- Fremantle
