= Rowville Football Club =

Names
- Nickname: The Hawks

2023 season
- After finals: 1st (Premiers)
- Home-and-away season: 2nd of 12
- Leading goalkicker: Matt Davey (31 goals)
- Best and fairest: Anthony Brolic

Club details
- Founded: 1964
- Colours: Brown, Gold
- Competition: Eastern Football Netball League
- Premierships: Seniors (6): 1980 • 1981 • 2002 • 2003 • 2012 • 2023
- Ground: Seebeck Oval

Rowville Football Club is an Australian rules football club from the Melbourne suburb of Rowville, Victoria. The club was founded in 1964 and currently plays in Premier Division of the Eastern Football League (EFL).

== History ==
The club played in its first finals game against Mooroolbark in 1967. Played at Lilydale, Rowville lost in a close match. 1971 was a big year for Reserves by winning the club's first Premiership Flag.

In 1972, the club commenced the process of building the present pavilion at Seebeck Oval. After much volunteer labour and council help, the pavilion was officially opened on 5 May 1977. The Seniors won back to back Premiership Flags in 1980 and 1981. The Reserves also won their second Premiership Flag in 1981 making it the most successful year for the club on the field. Len Hall was the Seniors coach at the time with Peter Burns coaching the Reserves.

1987 saw the move by the junior section of the club to Eildo Parade. Since this move, the junior club has steadily grown into one of the largest junior clubs in Melbourne.

The club became a limited license club in 1991 and gained a full license in 1993. A move towards obtaining poker machines was not supported. 2003 was an extremely successful year for the club under new coach Paul Mynott. Both the Seniors and the Colts went through the season undefeated and were both convincing Premiers on Grand Final Day. The Reserves were unlucky not to make it a clean sweep with a narrow loss to Kilsyth. The Seniors premiership saw the club move back into Division 3 again for the first time since 1986. The club did not stay in Division 3 for long however with the Seniors going back to back winning the 2004 Division 3 Grand Final over Sth Croydon by 26 points in the same fashion as the Seniors of '80 / '81. This was now the 2nd time the club had been promoted 2 Divisions in 2 seasons. A feat not achieved by any other EFL club in EFL history and Rowville had now done it twice. The club also won the Division and Club championship awards again with the Reserves reaching the Preliminary Final and the Colts making a 3rd successive Grand Final appearance. Since 2003 the club has been in affiliation with the Hawthorn Football Club of the AFL.

== VFL/AFL players ==
- Taylor Garner - North Melbourne
- Hayden Crozier - Fremantle/Western Bulldogs
- Paul Seedsman - Collingwood/Adelaide Crows
- Dylan Clarke - Essendon Football Club
- Ryan Clarke- Sydney Swans/North Melbourne
- Dylan Moore- Hawthorn Football Club
- Ryan Bastinac-North Melbourne/Brisbane Lions
- Bigoa Nyuon - Richmond Football Club
