= Surrey Park Football Club =

Surrey Park
- Full name: Surrey Park Football Club
- Nickname: Panthers
- Founded: 1994
- League: Eastern Football League
- Home ground: Surrey Park Reserve

Strip
- Black and white

The Surrey Park Football Club is an Australian rules football team that commenced in 1994. It is based in the eastern suburbs of Melbourne, Victoria, Australia and is part of the Eastern Football League.

== Senior club history ==
The club is a merger of the Surrey Hills Football Club and the East Camberwell Football Club.

=== Surrey Hills FC ===
The Surrey Hills FC first appeared in 1887. It played in the Reporter District Football League, the Victorian Amateur Football Association, the East Suburban Football League, the Croydon Ferntree Gully Football League and the Eastern Districts Football League. For a few years it served as the third open-age team for Box Hill, calling itself Box Hill/Surrey Hills.

=== East Camberwell FC ===
The East Camberwell FC was formed in 1946 and played in the Catholic Youth Men's Society (CYMS) competition until 1963 when it moved to the YCW competition where it remained until 1972. In 1973 it transferred to the Eastern Suburbs Churches competition and joined the Southern Football League in 1993.

=== The merger ===
The merger of Surrey Hills and East Camberwell Football Club occurred in late 1994 and the newly formed club played its first season as Surrey Park Football Club in the SFL in 1995. The merged club adopted its name after the venue where it plays its home games.

The club won its first senior-grade premiership in 2023, and has also won reserve-grade premierships in 1996, 1999, 2000, 2004, 2019, 2022 and 2025.

The club transferred to the more geographically appropriate Eastern Football League in 2002. It holds the EFL record for the most losses in a row at 67.

== Senior Premierships ==
- Division 2 Men - 2026
- Division 3 Men - 2024
- Division 2 Women - 2024
- Division 4 Men - 2023

== Junior Affiliation ==
The club is affiliated with the Surrey Park Junior Football Club, who play in the Yarra Junior Football League. Many players from their junior team move into the senior team.

== VFL/AFL players ==
- Colin Judd (Hawthorn) Also played for Camberwell in the VFA
- Phillip Murton (Hawthorn)
- Warwick Irwin Played 229 VFL games with Fitzroy and Collingwood
- Zac Clarke (Fremantle)
- Luke Conca Played 20 VFL Games with Richmond Tigers. Brother of Reece Conca.
- Jake Summers Played 10 VFL Seniors and 48 VFL Development League games with Box Hill Hawks. 2016 Box Hill Hawks Reserves Captain amd Leading Goal Kicker.
- Dylan Williams (Port Adelaide)
- Reef McInnes (Collingwood)
- Max Gruzewski (GWS Giants)
- Bailey Macdonald (Hawthorn)
- Elijah Tsatas (Essendon)
- Blake Leidler (Sydney)

== VFLW/AFLW players ==
- Hannah McLaren (Richmond)
- Amelie Gladman (Essendon)
