= Vermont Football Club =

Australian rules football club

Names
- Nickname: The Eagles

2023 season
- After finals: 2nd (Runners Up)
- Home-and-away season: 1st of 12
- Leading goalkicker: Adrian Kalcovski (57 goals)
- Best and fairest: Lachlan Johns

Club details
- Founded: 1919
- Colours: Purple, Gold
- Competition: Eastern Football League
- Coach: Matt Adolph
- Captain: Connor McCafferty
- Premierships: Seniors (23): 1955 • 1958 • 1969 • 1971 • 1982 • 1983 • 1986 • 1988 • 1989 • 1990 • 1991 • 1993 • 1994 • 1995 • 1997 • 1998 • 2001 • 2005 • 2006 • 2007 • 2009 • 2018 • 2019
- Ground: Vermont Recreation Reserve

The Vermont Football Club is an Australian rules football club located in Vermont, Victoria. They play in Premier Division of the Eastern Football League.

The captain is Connor McCafferty. As of 2025, the Eagles are coached by Matt Adolph.

The jumper is purple with a gold eagle on the front with the wings. With purple shorts at home and white shorts away with a clash jumper which is golden with a purple eagle on the front.

== History ==
=== Early years ===
Vermont were formed in late 1919 and played their first season in 1920 in the Reporter District FL defeating Warrandyte in their first game. The club played its first season in red and blue but from 1921 they played in purple and gold, and have not changed from that colour scheme since.

Vermont did not win any premierships in the Reporter District FL, and with a number of other clubs were foundation members of the Ringwood District FL in 1927. The lack of premiership success continued and the club was forced by the Great Depression to spend the years 1932 to 1934 as a merged entity with Mitcham. Upon separation in 1935, Vermont went into recess for the season due to internal arguments preventing an application for affiliation.

In 1936, Vermont joined the Federal FL for a season and had appointed former Collingwood champion Charlie Pannam as coach. The club wasn't successful in the Federal league and in 1937 they joined the East Suburban FL. But the following year they fielded an Under 21 team in the Ringwood District FL. This lasted for two years only as World War II started to bite and Vermont went into recess until 1948.

=== After the war ===
It is not known where Vermont played in 1948 or 1949, but in 1950 they rejoined the East Suburban FL and played in the B Grade competition. In 1955 the senior clubs played in one grade to cover for Mitcham and Ringwood's move to the Croydon Ferntree Gully FL, and this was a boost for the club as they made the grand final – and defeated Auburn in the decider to win their first ever premiership. The bottom then dropped out leading to a demotion back to B Grade for the 1958 season. The Eagles bounced back to win the B Grade premiership over East Burwood, but they were not promoted as they then decided to follow Mitcham and Ringwood to the Croydon Ferntree Gully league.

=== To the present day ===
Vermont started in the competition's first division and has never left Division 1 in their time in the competition. They built up and made the finals for the first time in the league in 1962 – the same year the CFTGFL changed its name to the Eastern Districts FL. They made the grand final the following year but they were defeated by East Burwood. This led to a few lean years until 1969, when Vermont picked up its third premiership defeating Blackburn. This was followed by another premiership in 1971 over Mitcham. From 1969 to 1974 the Eagles only missed the finals once, before another lean period.

Vermont returned to the finals in 1980 and lost the grand final to Mitcham. This was the start of an incredible period for the Eagles. From 1980 to 2009, Vermont only missed the finals in 1984 and 1987. From 1988 to 2001 Vermont only missed the grand final in 1992. The Eagles won the premiership in 1982, 1983 and 1986 before picking up four in a row from 1988 to 1991. During this period Vermont had an unbroken run of 61 wins. From 1993 to 1995 they won three more premierships before losing to Donvale in 1996. They then won again in 1997, 1998 and 2001. After three seasons not making the grand final, Vermont won another three premierships in a row from 2005 to 2007 and then their most recent premiership in 2009.

In 2010 and 2011 Vermont didn't make the finals, the first time they had missed the finals two years in a row since 1979. But they returned in 2012 losing the grand final to Balwyn. Then again in 2016 losing to Balwyn by 12 points, 10.8.68 to 12.8.80.

== VFL/AFL players ==
- Kris Barlow - Hawthorn
- Mitch Honeychurch - Western Bulldogs
- Chris Knights - Richmond
- Matthew Arnot - Richmond
- Aaron Mullett - North Melbourne/Carlton
- Sam Weideman - Melbourne/Essendon
- Darren Williams (Australian footballer) - Essendon
- Connor Downie - Hawthorn
- Blake Drury- North Melbourne
