= Alison Forbes =

Australian book designer

Alison Forbes (born 1933) is an Australian book designer and illustrator. Over a period of five decades she has worked as Australia's "first full-time independent book designer", and produced many prize-winning book designs of Australian titles, beginning with Alan Marshall's I Can Jump Puddles (1955).

== Career ==
Forbes was born in Melbourne in 1933 and attended Camberwell Grammar School.

She studied design at the Melbourne Technical College (now Royal Melbourne Institute of Technology). After graduation in 1953 she worked at the Melbourne Herald while undertaking freelance illustration and book design in her free hours. At the age of 23 she was appointed as the first staff designer at the Melbourne University Press.

In 1963 she travelled to London and during the next three years and in order to gain book trade experience, she worked for two British publishers, the Associated Book Publishers (a conglomerate of Methuen, Eyre & Spottiswoode, and others) and the smaller Rupert Hart-Davis Ltd.

Returning to Australia in 1967, she worked for five decades as a full-time book designer, until her retirement from full time design in "about 2005". Over the years she worked alongside such major figures in the Australian publishing world as Frank Eyre (Oxford University Press, Melbourne), Andrew Fabinyi (F. W. Cheshire), Max Harris (Sun Books), Gwyn James (Melbourne University Press), Lloyd O’Neil, Sam Ure Smith (Sydney Ure Smith) and Ken Wilder (William Collins, Melbourne).

She has devoted herself to book design work, her focus being to create an "enduring body of work unique in its quality, and quantity" and was not tempted by the higher financial rewards on offer in "commercial graphic design or advertising" with the inevitable compromises demanded in those fields. The poet and critic Max Harris, who had worked with her on several projects, stated: "The meticulous Alison Forbes hasn’t lost her advanced and distinctive sense of the highest design principles".

== Awards ==
- 1955: Australian Book Publishers Association (ABPA) Books of the Year award, for book design of Alan Marshall's I Can Jump Puddles, Melbourne: F. W. Cheshire, 1955; Cleveland and New York: The World Publishing Company, 1956
- c. 1963: Australian Book Review – Transfield Book Production Award, for book design of Alexandra Hasluck's Remembered With Affection, Melbourne: Oxford University Press, 1963
- 1968: Transfield Book Production Award, for The Land that Waited by Max Harris and Alison Forbes, Melbourne: Lansdowne Press, 1968
- 1974–75: Australian Publishers Association's Book of the Year Award, for book design of Allan McEvey's John Cotton's Birds of the Port Phillip District of New South Wales 1843-1849, Sydney: William Collins, 1974
- 1989: Australian Book Publishers Association's inaugural Award of Honour "for her continued and outstanding contribution to Australian book design and production"
- 2018: Australian Book Designers Association Hall of Fame
- 2022: Design Institute of Australia – Hall of Fame

== Bibliography ==
In addition to those mentioned in the Awards section above, the hundreds of books designed or illustrated by Alison Forbes, many of which "occupy a most significant position within the development of Australian culture", have included:

- Robin Boyd, The Australian Ugliness, Melbourne: F. W. Cheshire, 1960.
- Hume Dow and John Barnes, eds., World Unknown: An Anthology of Australian Prose. Melbourne: Oxford University Press, 1964.
- Michael Cannon, The Land Boomers, Melbourne University Press, 1966.
- Judith Wright, The Generations of Men. Melbourne: Oxford University Press, 1967.
- Joan Lindsay, Picnic at Hanging Rock, Melbourne: F. W. Cheshire, 1967.
- Ulli Beier and Albert Maori Kiki, Hohao: The Uneasy Survival of an Art Form in the Papuan Gulf, Melbourne: Thomas Nelson Australia, 1970.
- Ronald M. Berndt and E. S. Phillips, The Australian Aboriginal Heritage: An Introduction through the Arts, Sydney: Australian Society for Education Through the Arts in association with Ure Smith, Sydney, 1973.
- Stanley Breeden and Kay Breeden, Australia's North, Collins, 1975 (A Natural History of Australia, Volume Three).
- Russel Ward, The Australian Legend, Melbourne: Oxford University Press, 1978.
- Bernard Smith and Alwyne C. Wheeler, eds., The Art of the First Fleet and Other Early Australian Drawings, Melbourne: Oxford University Press, 1988; New Haven: Yale University Press, in association with the Australian Academy of the Humanities and the British Museum (Natural History), 1988.
- Geoffrey Serle, Robin Boyd: A Life, Melbourne: Oxford University Press, 1995.
