= Blackburn Primary School =

Historic Australian School

Location
- 185 Surrey Rd; Blackburn, Victoria, 3130; Australia; 37°49′1.07″S 145°9′26″E

Information
- Motto: Always Ready
- Established: 1st of May 1889
- Sister school: Beijing FCD International Yuan Yang Primary School and Nanjing Fuxing Primary School
- School number: 2923
- Principal: Scott Minetti (2026)
- Years offered: Prep - Year 6
- Gender: Co-educational
- Enrollment: 434 (2024)
- Houses: Cook, Dampier, Tasman, Sturt
- Colors: Maroon, Gold

Blackburn Primary School is a public co-educational primary school located in the Melbourne suburb of Blackburn, Victoria, Australia. Founded in 1889, the school was the first in Blackburn and the 2923rd state school in the country. It was a forerunner in school instrumental music education in Australia.

According to the Australian Curriculum, Assessment and Reporting Authority, Blackburn Primary School had an enrolment of 440 students and employed 32 teaching staff and 19 non-teaching staff as of 2024. It is administered by the Victorian Department of Education.

== History ==
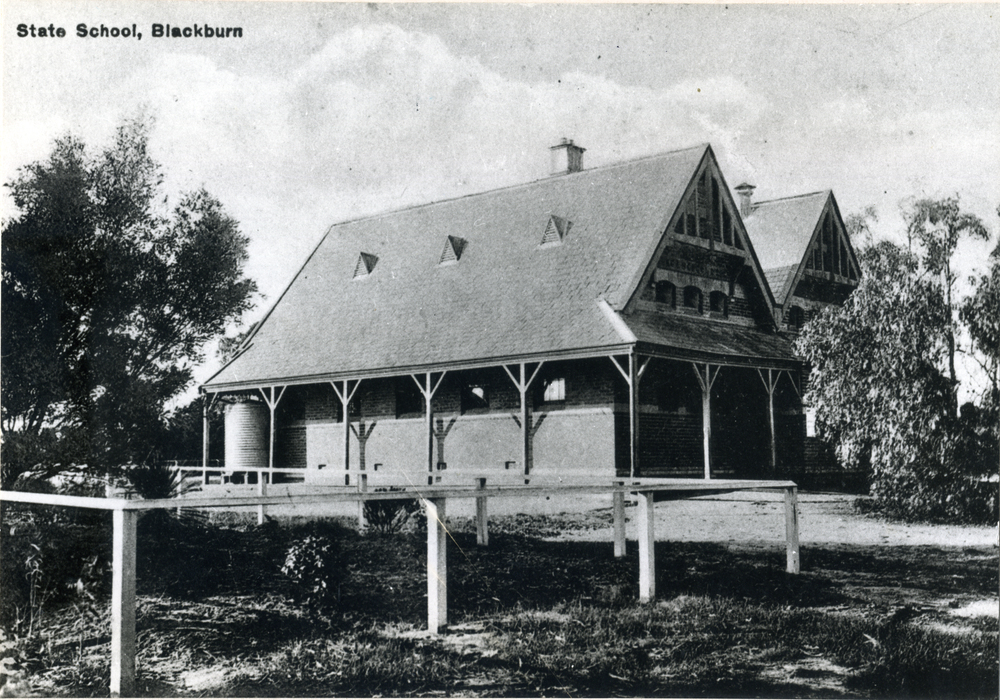
The original schoolhouse, photographed in 1911

State School No. 2923 opened on the 1st of May in 1889. It had 116 students and two teachers (including the head teacher) on the roll in 1890. The headmaster John Williams lived opposite the school site and had previously been the headmaster of Sagoe Common School No. 463 where Blackburn students had studied prior to No. 2923's opening. A brick building was opened in 1902 with musical performances by schoolchildren to accommodate the growing population. Further expansions were made in 1912–13 with an acre to the east bought from orchadist Auguste Zerbe and an acre and thirty perches from merchant "A.H. Hirch".

Post World War I, the school motto "Always Ready" was coined. This features on the school uniform and in the logo of the school. Head teacher Franz Stielow planted the first school garden during this decade. Gardening and cooking became a specialist (taught by subject dedicated teacher) in the following decades. Blackburn Primary School's first official parent organisation 'the mother's club' was formed during the 1902 by Miss. M. J. Edmonson, a teacher at the school. The club held fundraisers and events supporting the school. A Drum and Fife Band created in 1929 by head teacher Harold G. Bretherton who was a returned serviceman, was the school's first instrumental music ensemble. The band was one out of 13 in Victoria.

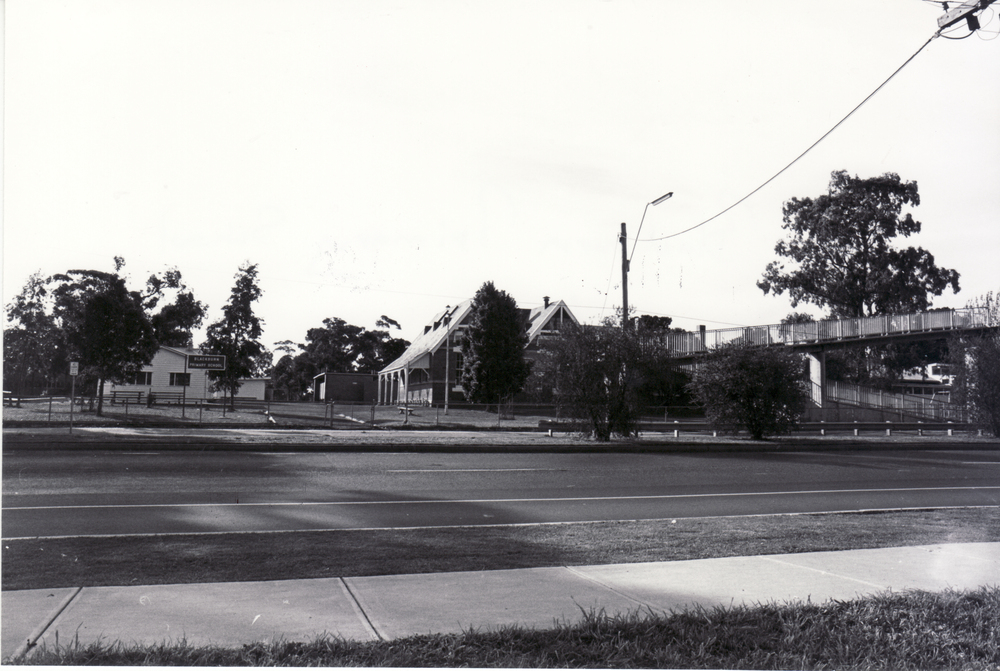
The overpass on Whitehorse Road, photographed in 1977

In 1944 the grounds were expanded again. One acre on the corner between Surrey and Whitehorse road was purchased from local councilor Roy Smith for 1449 pounds, and a plot of land to the north from "Mrs. F. Platt" for 345 pounds. Mrs. Platt's land later became the oval area.

The 1940s-1960s saw car traffic increase in Melbourne. This became a concern for Blackburn State School's parents, especially on the large thoroughfare Whitehorse road. Police were instated at the Whitehorse road crossing after 11 year old Heather Gale was struck and died in 1958. This is now the location of an overpass.

In 1964, Laburnum, Blackburn Lake and Springvale State Schools opened, greatly reducing the school population. A plan of the school buildings from this year showed reassignments of the emptied classrooms for art and crafts, science, a library and a film room. 1969 saw State Schools such as Blackburn become Primary Schools as post-primary education became more commonplace.

In 1978 Blackburn Primary School hosted refugee children living in the Eastbridge Hostel in Nunawading for an English language learning program but they were moved to St Joseph's Catholic School in Surrey Hills.

The school's centenary in 1989 sparked refurbishment of the school bell This bell had previously swung from a gum tree in the early years of the school. A school history was also written by Lynne Dickson.

The historical school house, a single storied brick building received a local heritage overlay in 1994. Major construction was completed throughout the school in the 2010s, described by the local newspaper as a "rebuild".

== Demographics ==
As of 2023, Blackburn Primary School had 433 students. 29% had English as a second language and 0% were Aboriginal or Torres Strait Islanders. As of 2024, The school population is in the 94th percentile of the Australian Curriculum, Assessment and Reporting Authority's Index of Community Socio-Educational Advantage. 54% of the school population has a language background other than English with the majority of these being Chinese.

== Curriculum ==
Blackburn Primary School uses the Victorian curriculum which "reflects much of the Australian Curriculum F-10". It has six specialist subjects. Of these kitchen garden is also taught at Old Orchard Primary School. The LOTE (Mandarin) is taught at Whitehorse and Old Orchard Primary Schools; and Science introduced as of 2024 is also common among neighbouring schools

=== Band & instrumental music program ===
The music program at Blackburn Primary School was established early on in its history and was marketed as a strength of the school by local news. Former minister of Education and musician Peter Garrett claimed the school was an early and rare adopter of primary school symphonic band.

=== Sports ===
Blackburn Primary School competes as part of the Eastern Metropolitan Region in interschool sports alongside Associated Public Schools of Victoria ("public" in the British sense and not government schools), Boroondara, Dandenong Ranges, Knox, Manningham, Maroondah, Monash-Waverley and Yarra primary divisions as part of Whitehorse Primary division.

== Community involvement ==
Blackburn Primary School is a polling location with democracy sausages.

Blackburn Primary School is part of the Inner Eastern Riversdale Melbourne Network, a school network which coordinates funds, and program planning among school leadership.

Local sporting club Blackburn Football Club ran clinics with the school as well as others, with the 'Blackburn District Primary School Sports Association Girls Footy Day' being hosted at their grounds of Morton Park

The school had connections to the neighbouring medical complex Blackburn Clinic in 1993; leasing parking land to the clinics and receiving "floodlit tennis courts, an amphitheatre, electric barbecue and other outdoor facilities" in return. Parking land agreements have also been negotiated with the One Community Church which is based across Surrey Road.

Alumni group "The class of 1957 group consists" of Blackburn Primary School alumni from the 1950s-60s. The group documents the history of Blackburn and surrounding areas during their youth.

== Notable alumni ==
- Rupert Henwood - Coach and father of Jack Henwood, grandfather of Olympian Craig Henwood. All were clay shooters.
- Frank Sedgman - Tennis player, trained at the school's tennis courts (then belonging to the council)
- John Arnold Seitz - Cricket player, then Director of Education
- Frank Cheshire - Bookseller and publisher, especially of educational texts.
- Rowland S. Howard - Rock musician and songwriter

== Former headteachers ==
1. John Williams (1889—1916)
2. John Cubbins (1916—1922)
3. Franz Stielow (1922—1924)
4. Richard M.R. Skewes (1924—1929)
5. Harold G. Bretherton (1929—1933)
6. Ernest H. Carter (1933—1937)
7. John G. Leckie (1937—1940)
8. Norman G. McNicol (1940—1943)
9. Frank L. Vick (1943—1946)
10. Cecil A. Buchanan (1947—1949)
11. Robert J. Currie (1949—1953)
12. Leslie Edwards (1954—1961)
13. Ralph M. Trewhella (1961—1968)
14. Frederick C. Wenborn (1968—1970)
15. Maurice P. Douglas (1970—1972)
16. George H. Piggott (1972—1974)
17. Graeme F. Chadwick (1974—1975)
18. Margaret Cartwright (1975—1977)
19. Francis L. Ryan (1977—1981)
20. Victor Byrdy (1982)
21. Barry Tonzing (1983)
22. Bernie Manders (1984—1985)
23. William Jackson (1986—1991)
24. Unknown
25. Susan Henderson/Barclay (At least 2010—2013)
26. Clayton Sturzaker (2014—2018)
27. Andrew Cock (2018—2026)
28. Scott Minetti (2026—)

== See also ==
- Education in Victoria
- List of government schools in Victoria, Australia
