= Andrew Fabinyi =

Hungarian-born Australian publisher

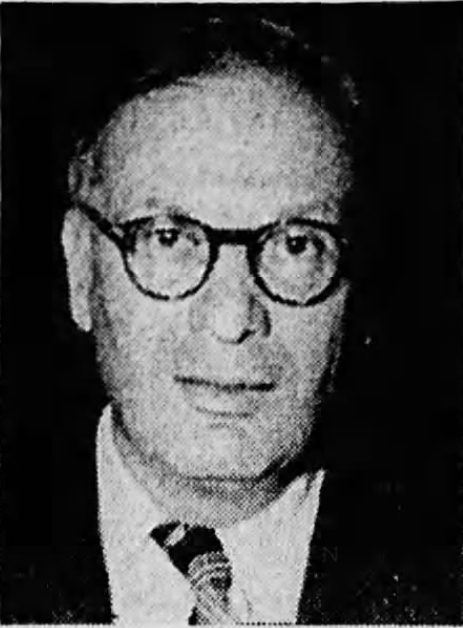
- Born: Andor Fabinyi; 27 December 1908; Budapest, Hungary
- Died: 25 July 1978 (aged 69); Hornsby, New South Wales, Australia
- Occupations: Publisher, bookseller
- Awards: Order of the British Empire; Redmond Barry Award

Andrew Fabinyi (27 December 1908 – 25 July 1978) was a Hungarian-born Australian publisher and bookseller, working first with Frank Cheshire, Melbourne and then Pergamon Press, Sydney. He strove for an increased public interest in Australian society and civilisation and a broad internationalism in culture and politics. He became "extremely influential in the literary community of Australia" and was appointed to the Order of the British Empire "in recognition of his work for Australian literature".

== Early education and career ==
Fabinyi was born Andor Fabinyi in Budapest, Hungary on 27 December 1908. His parents were Imre Fabinyi, a lawyer, and his wife Margit, née Nagel.

He studied at the Minta Gymnasium ("model high school") and the Royal Hungarian Pázmány Péter University. He then successfully undertook studies for a doctorate with a thesis on the psychology of aesthetics.

He made his first entry into the booktrade by joining the Budapest bookshop and publisher, Lauffer, and then in 1932 by starting an agency distributing British books in Hungary and representing Oxford University Press. Harrap and Longman, Green, among other publishers.

== Migration to Australia ==
With the approach of World War II and the rise of the fascist leader Admiral Miklós Horthy, Fabinyi feared being forced to join the army and to fight for Adolf Hitler and left Hungary to migrate to New Zealand which, as he later explained, "was the furthest place I could go."

Arriving at Melbourne in July 1939 after a short stay in Sydney where he had tried without success to "set himself up as a publisher's agent", he was introduced to the Melbourne bookseller Frank Cheshire by Enid Moodie Heddle, the Australian representative for Longman, and was offered, and accepted, a job in the F. W. Cheshire bookshop on Little Collins Street.

Deciding to stay in Australia, he obtained permanent residency and in October 1940 married Elisabeth Clare Robinson.

In 1941 he volunteered for the Australian army but was rejected because of his Hungarian nationality (at that time Hungarians were regarded as aliens). In 1942 he succeeded in joining the Citizen Military Forces and being posted to a labour battalion in Albury. Later he joined the Australian Army Education Service. Becoming an Australian citizen in December 1944, he was a Warrant Officer and in charge of the Service's libraries when he was discharged following the end of the War.

== F. W. Cheshire ==
Rejoining F. W. Cheshire, Fabinyi developed the bookselling side of the firm. He was promoted to Retail Manager. In 1954, when the firm moved to start a separate company, F. W. Cheshire Publishing Pty Ltd, to handle its growing publishing activities, he was appointed its Publishing Director.

Until the late 1960s he built up "an impressive and wide-ranging list of titles". The main emphasis in the list was secondary school textbooks which generated profits for F. W. Cheshire year after year. However, the Cheshire list went beyond utilitarian titles and "books about the distinguishing characteristics of Australia" and ranged across "the whole breadth of national interests, from fiction and poetry to economics, politics and sociology".

The first two trade books Fabinyi accepted for publishing, early in his career with F. W. Cheshire, were W. Y. Tsao's Two Pacific Democracies: China and Australia with an introduction by the historian, Max Crawford, and Wilfred Burchett's Pacific Treasure Island: New Caledonia (1941). The latter work became a bestseller when the United States opened a major naval base in New Caledonia during the Pacific War and the Australian public's interest in that territory soared.

In the two following decades he picked and published works of little known authors, many of which would later be adjudged by critic Geoffrey Dutton as being among "Australia's greatest books". These included the architect Robin Boyd's The Australian Ugliness (1960), Alan Marshall's autobiography I Can Jump Puddles (1955), and Joan Lindsay's novel Picnic at Hanging Rock (1967).

Other distinguished authors and works published by Fabinyi at Cheshire were predominantly in the fields of the arts, history, biography and the social sciences (and frequently with a distinctively Australian connection) and included Kenneth Cook (Tuna, 1967), Bruce Dawe (No Fixed Address: Poems, 1962), C. P. Fitzgerald (The Empress Wu, 1955), Brian Fitzpatrick (The Australian Commonwealth, 1956), Xavier Herbert (Disturbing Element, 1963), David Martin (Spiegel the Cat, 1961), Barry Oakley (A Wild Ass of a Man, 1967), Cyril Pearl (So, You Want to Buy a House and Live in It!, 1961), Clive Turnbull (Black War: The Extermination of the Tasmanian Aborigines, 1943) and Judah Waten (Distant Land, 1964).

He also published Peter Coleman's Australian Civilisation (1960), a symposium on the state of Australia at the start of a "new and promising decade" with essays from Australian intellectuals such as Vincent Buckley, Max Harris, Sol Encel, Donald Horne and Robert Hughes. This book inspired later updates, notably John McLaren's A Nation Apart (1983) and Richard Nile's Australian Civilization (1994).

A similar Fabinyi publishing initiative was Sol Encel's Australian Society: A Sociological Introduction (first edition 1965) which was a bestseller and went through eleven editions.

Fabinyi also published fiction by Hugh Atkinson, Vance Palmer and Neilma Sidney, poetry by Vincent Buckley, Geoffrey Dutton and Lionel Lindsay, and anthologies including Australia Writes, Australian Signpost, and Span ("a collection of Asian and Australian writing".)

In 1968 he was promoted to Managing Director of the firm which by then was known as the Cheshire Group.

== Pergamon Press and retirement ==
In 1969, following the British-based Hamlyn/International Publishing Company's acquisition of Cheshire, Fabinyi left the firm and became Director and then Managing Director at Robert Maxwell's Pergamon Press (Australia) in Sydney. Part of his new job included becoming Director of Maxwell's British Book Centre in New York, which Fabinyi viewed as "offering splendid opportunities for Australian books". Although he had previously noted that the British publishing "invasion" of Australian publishers had caused a great deal of "controversy", he noted that book publishing "needs long term-investment and ... thinking" and the "brutal fact" was that Australian investors would not invest in long-term projects. He saw his new appointment with Pergamon as a way to "build up Australian book publishing over a period" with "substantial financial backing".

In the years 1970–78 Fabinyi was a director of the La Trobe University Bookshop. From 1975 he was a research fellow at the University of New South Wales and in 1976 he joined the editorial board of the University of New South Wales Press.

In 1977 he retired from Pergamon and became an advisor to Longman Cheshire which he continued until his death in the following year.

== Publishing, libraries, internationalism ==
In his own published writings in Meanjin from 1947, including annual reports on the state of Australian publishing, and in his regular columns in the early numbers of Australian Book Review under the pen name of "Peter Pica" on the "state of book production and design", Fabinyi propounded his belief in Australian culture and thought.

He served as the Chairman of the Australian Book Publishers' Association (now known as the Australian Publishers Association) in 1965-67 and undertook stints in allied organisations and committees, including the Australian the Book Trade Advisory Committee, the A.B.P.A. book export development committee, the Australian Book Fair Committee and the judges' panel of the A.B.P.A.'s annual book design awards. He introduced the Australian Book Week, inspired by the popular Hungarian Book Days that he had experienced during his youth.

Fabinyi's focus on good book design resulted in memorable cover and interior designs commissioned for such F. W. Cheshire publications as the first editions of Picnic at Hanging Rock, The Australian Ugliness and I Can Jump Puddles, all three of which were the work of the award-winning designer Alison Forbes.

A fervent supporter of the role of libraries in the book world, he was for years active in the Library Association of Australia, being part of that association's Public Libraries Division in 1962 and President of the Victorian branch in 1955, 1959 and 1965-67. In 1974, in recognition for his work on the role of libraries he was given the Association's Sir Redmond Barry award.

A report by the Australian Arts Enquiry Committee on Fabinyi served has been credited with bringing about the creation of the Australia Council. Together with Jean May Campbell and Lina Bryans, he organised the first Moomba Book Week, an "event that became a feature of the annual Melbourne festival".

Fabinyi supported internationalism in the world of culture and politics and was Chairman (1973–77) of the Australian National Committee for UNESCO and in 1971-73 was a member of the International Advisory Committee of Documentation at UNESCO, Paris. He was Chairman of the Australian International Book Year Committee with the same organisation.

He was for several years President of both the Victorian and New South Wales branches of the Australian Institute of International Affairs and from 1960 was a member of the Committee for Economic Development of Australia.

== Personal life ==
Fabinyi married Elisabeth Clare Robinson (1912–2002), an administrative officer and librarian, in the Presbyterian Church in the Melbourne suburb of Toorak on 26 October 1940. They would have five children, social worker Margaret, social worker Janet, neurosurgeon Gavin, film producer Martin and music industry consultant Jeremy.

He died suddenly of cardiovascular disease on 25 July 1978 in Hornsby, New South Wales.

== Awards ==
- 1960: Order of the British Empire
- 1974: Redmond Barry Award (Library Association of Australia)

== Select bibliography ==
=== Books ===
- The Australian Literary Scene, Canberra: News and Information Bureau, 1960.
- Social and Cultural Issues of Migration, Canberra: Australian Citizenship Convention, 1970.

=== Articles and forewords ===
- "The State of Australian Publishing", in: Meanjin, Summer 1947, vol. 6, no. 4, pp. 219–221, 272.
- "On the Book Front", in: Meanjin, Winter 1948, vol. 7, no. 2, pp. 124–125.
- "The Australian Book", Meanjin, Spring 1958, vol. 17, no. 3, pp. 312–318); Texas Quarterly, Summer 1962, vol. 5, no. 2, pp. 77–81; reprinted in: Image of Australia, University of Texas Press, 2012.
- "Australian Book Perspective", in: Meanjin Quarterly, July 1961, vol. 20, no. 2, pp. 212–216.
- "Australia's literary testing ground: ON NATIVE GROUNDS: Australian Writing from Meanjin Quarterly" (review), in: The Age, 27 January 1968, p. 21.
- "Books and adult education", in: Derek Whitelock, ed. Adult Education in Australia, Rushcutters Bay, NSW: Pergamon Press Australia, 1970.
- "More Promising, More Dangerous", in: Clive Turnbull, ed., Hammond Innes Introduces Australia, London: Andre Deutsch, 1971; New York: McGraw-Hill, 1971; Melbourne: Hill of Content, 1971.
- Foreword in: George Farwell, Farwell Country: Selected Writings, 1946-1976, Melbourne, Thomas Nelson, 1977.

=== Books and articles about Fabinyi ===
- John McLaren, ed., A Nation Apart: Essays in Honour of Andrew Fabinyi: Personal Views of Australia in the Eighties, Melbourne, Longman Cheshire, 1983.
- John Hanrahan, "Australia's sloppy slide downhill", The Age, 13 August 1983, p. 13. (Review of the book A Nation Apart.)
- Steve Kafkarisos, "Australian Books and Australian Libraries: The Views of Andrew Fabinyi", in: Frank Upward and Jean P Whyte, eds., Peopling a Profession: Papers from the Fourth Forum on Australian Library History, Monash University, 25 and 26 September 1989, Monash University, 1989 (4th Forum on Australian Library History).
- John McLaren, "Andrew Fabinyi and Cheshire", in: Craig Munro and Robyn Sheahan-Bright, eds., Paper Empires: A History of the Book in Australia, 1946-2005, St. Lucia, University of Queensland Press, 2006.
