= Through Darkest Pondelayo =

Book by Joan Lindsay

- First edition cover
- Author: Joan Lindsay (psd. Serena Livingstone-Stanley)
- Language: English
- Genre: Satire, travel novel, metafiction
- Publisher: Chatto & Windus
- Publication date: 1936
- Publication place: Australia
- Pages: 200

Through Darkest Pondelayo: An account of the adventures of two English ladies on a cannibal island is a 1936 Australian satirical novel by Joan Lindsay, published under the pseudonym Serena Livingstone-Stanley. The book, which was Lindsay's first-published work, was based on her time spent traveling in Europe, and functions as a parody of English tourists abroad. It is structured in the format of a travel book through a series of first-person letters edited together to form a metafictional narrative.

The narrative is accompanied by photographs of the adventures, which were shot by Lindsay with her friends in a backyard in East Melbourne.

== Plot ==
The narrative is presented as a series of letters edited by one Rev. Barnaby Whitecorn D.D., who is purported to be the author's "next door neighbour," and is also illustrated with plated photographs of the adventures.

The author, the English Serena Livingston-Stanley, her friend, Francis, and maidservant Placket, sail from Harwich on "May 14th" in an unspecified year into the Mediterranean and via the Suez Canal reach Ceylon on 12 June. Ten days later they sight the island of Pondelayo, an island inhabited by cannibals, and anchor off Bogtuk. The women lodge at the Mission House, and are entertained by Judge Wiggins and his topless black female 'servant' Rosie, and in mid-July set out to explore the remote interior of the island accompanied by a wide array of characters, including Wiggins, Rosie, the Hon. Mrs. Pringle, Mrs. Garble and Captain Fitzkhaki-Campbell.

In Dead Mother-in-Laws Cove, the adventure party faces a crocodile-infested swamp, and on 27 July arrives at Tikki Bahaar, the first native village they encounter. They investigate the Lake of a Million Fishes, where Francis gets lost in the jungle and Placket gives a month's notice. Later, in August, they cross the notorious Bobo River, cross the Parrot Gully, and climb Mount Blim Blam, a volcano in active eruption. From the Great Cataract they beat their way through the dense jungles of Upper Timwiffi and arrive back at Dead Mother-in-Laws Cove on 18 September. The narrative ends at the Mission House on 1 October with the author telegraphing the Reverend Whitecorn for the loan of five pounds to cover the cost of her return passage. She arrives safely back in the English Channel on 7 November.

== Narrative style ==
The book is presented as an autobiographical travel narrative. Lindsay wrote the novel as a satire on English tourists abroad after having spent significant time in Europe with husband Daryl Lindsay. Included in the book are multiple photos, presented as lithographs, featuring Lindsay and friends posed in various simulations as the characters enacting events depicted within the narrative. The narrative is also littered with intentional grammatical errors. In reviewing the book, Martin Boyd called it "one of the best collections of malapropisms in the English language."

== See also ==
- List of metafictional works
- Fake memoirs

== Bibliography ==
- O'Neill, Terrence (May 2009). "Joan Lindsay: A Time for Everything". The La Trobe Journal (83). State Library of Victoria.
