= Time Without Clocks =

Book by Joan Lindsay

- First edition
- Author: Joan Lindsay
- Language: English
- Genre: Autobiography
- Publisher: F. W. Cheshire
- Publication date: 1962
- Publication place: Australia
- Media type: Print
- Pages: 216

Time Without Clocks is a 1962 autobiographical novel by Joan Lindsay. The novel recounts Lindsay's early years married to prolific Australian artist Daryl Lindsay. The novel was published in 1962 by F. W. Cheshire, and later re-published by Penguin Books.
