= Mulberry Hill (Langwarrin South, Victoria) =

Heritage-listed house in Melbourne, Victoria, Australia

- Location of the house in Greater Metropolitan Melbourne

General information
- Status: Completed
- Type: House (former); Living history museum and gardens
- Architectural style: Eclecticism; Inter-War Classical Revival; Cape Cod; American Colonial architecture
- Location: 385 Golf Links Road, Langwarrin South, City of Frankston, Melbourne, Victoria, Australia
- Coordinates: 38°11′12″S 145°10′00″E
- Completed: 1926; 100 years ago

Technical details
- Material: Weatherboard; tiles

Design and construction
- Architect: Harold Desbrowe-Annear

Site notes
- Owner: National Trust of Australia (Victoria)
- Public access: Monthly; 3rd Sunday
- Website: nationaltrust.org.au

Victorian Heritage Register
- Official name: Mulberry Hill
- Type: Registered place
- Designated: 23 August 1989
- Reference no.: H0745
- Heritage overlay no.: HO1
- Categories: Residential buildings (private); Recreation and Entertainment

Register of the National Estate
- Official name: Mulberry Hill House and Grounds
- Type: Defunct register
- Designated: 24 June 1997
- Reference no.: 15603

Mulberry Hill is a house and living history museum located at 385 Golf Links Road in Langwarrin South, (Note: Referred to as located in Baxter in one source.) in the City of Frankston, in the south eastern suburbs of Melbourne, in Victoria, Australia.

Mulberry Hill is remembered as the home of Sir Daryl (1889–1976) and Lady Joan Lindsay (nee a'Becket) and as a place frequented by other members of the eponymous and creative Lindsay family and some of Australia's most illustrious businessmen, politicians and artists. Upon her death in 1984 and childless, Lady Lindsay bequeathed the house and its contents to the Victorian branch of the National Trust, to open to the public as a living history museum.

Completed in 1926 and built on the traditional lands of the Bunurong people, the house museum was added to the Victorian Heritage Register on 23 August 1989 in recognition of its historical and architectural significance; and was also added to non-statutory lists by the Victorian branch of the National Trust on 26 September 1974 and the now defunct Register of the National Estate on 24 June 1997.

== History ==
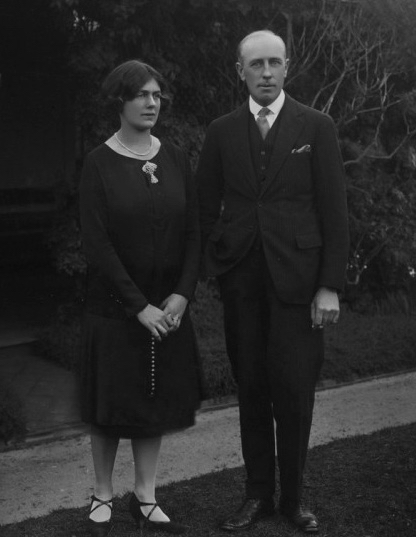
Lady Joan and Sir Daryl Lindsay in 1925

Sir Daryl Lindsay was a renowned artist who served as the Director of the National Gallery of Victoria from 1941 to 1956, and was a founder and early leading figure in the National Trust of Australia (Victoria). Lady Joan Lindsay was equally well known as a renowned journalist and as the author of such books as Picnic at Hanging Rock, Time Without Clocks, Facts Soft and Hard, and the children's book Syd Sixpence.

With the advice of their friend the architect Harold Desbrowe-Annear, the Lindsays developed what had been a simple late-nineteenth century weatherboard cottage into a stylish and original residence including a studio, wooden stables, and an impressive scenic circular porch with slender white columns and long wooden shutters. Some of the detailing was purchased from Whelan the Wrecker. Daryl Lindsay himself developed the garden. The Lindsays lived at Mulberry Hill until the Great Depression forced them to rent the house and live in more humble accommodation at Bacchus Marsh until their financial position recovered.

When Lady Joan died in 1984 the property was bequeathed to the National Trust with which the Lindsays were closely associated. The Trust has maintained Mulberry Hill as a museum dedicated to the Lindsays.

== Description ==
=== Building ===
Prior to Sir Daryl and Lady Joan purchasing Mulberry Hill it contained a tiny weatherboard cottage, built in the 1880s, set on 12 hectares (30 acres) of natural bushland, an apple orchard, gum trees, swamp tea trees, she oaks, wild cherries, a little creek, a waterhole and an enormous spreading mulberry tree. Sir Daryl spent many hours drawing plans for the current house before they eventually engaged Desbrowe-Annear, a successful architect of the 1920s, to develop and finish the house in an eclectic mix of Classical Revival, Cape Cod, and American Colonial architecture styles. The house was completed in 1926 and incorporated the original cottage into its design.

The house is two storey, built of weatherboard with a tiled roof. The house contains a formal entrance with a semi-circular verandah and a balcony bounded by timber rail and balustrade. The verandah covers the front door with its upper fanlight and the large double multi-paned sash windows either side. The arch of the fanlight is echoed in a small door to the upper and other arch topped windows on the first floor. Windows on the first floor have small projecting gables sheltering them. Some of the ground floor windows have external shutters. A garage is joined to the north-west of the house and a kitchen wing to the north-east with the upper floor balcony overlooking the back courtyard garden. The house design maximises the sunny north-easterly views across the Mornington Peninsula to Western Port Bay from the front rooms and verandah.

The internal layout of the house is designed without corridors. The dining room links the studio and kitchen wing with the large sitting room, guest bedroom and entrance hall. The studio once formed the front rooms of the original cottage and was modified at the same time that the main part of the house was constructed. Internal walls were removed and large windows inserted to create a bright and workable space for Sir Daryl's painting.

==== Furnishings ====
The furniture in the house was collected over many years and is essentially conservative. The paintings in the house mainly date from the 1950s and are an odd mixture, not following any strict pattern of taste, style or school. Many of the works had great sentimental value to the Lindsays and are representative of their circle of artist friends and associates. The current decorative schemes date from the last twenty-five years.

=== Gardens ===
Significant features of the garden include a large semi-circular lawn bisected by a central path, a sundial surrounded by a circular tea tree (Leptospermum laevigatum) hedge, a park, a drive lined with Eucalyptus cladocalyx and E. botryoides spaced irregularly, a courtyard, a vegetable garden, a low brick wall marking the eastern boundary of the front garden with urns and balls on alternate pillars and a number of planting beds containing a variety of species. The central path, located between the porch and front gate, is constructed of brick and contains two pairs of urns flanking the path near the porch and half way along the path. The park is located between the central path and the entrance drive and is dominated by eucalyptus species such as E. cladocalyx, E. globulus, and E. botryoides. Other plantings in the park include Hakea laurina, Melaleuca styphelioides, Acacia floribunda, Grevillea robusta, Cupressus sempervirens, Viburnum tinus, Coprosma repens and Ulmus procera. The entrance to the park is marked by two wooden gates supported by brick pillars topped with concrete balls.

The courtyard is enclosed by a brick fence and is dominated by a large mulberry tree (Morus nigra). It contains planting beds of Pittosporum undulatum, Grevillea robusta, tree ferns, stag ferns (Platycerium bifurcatum), fishbone ferns, camellias, aspidistra and tradescantia. The north-east corner is paved with irregular shaped concrete pieces, dull red in colour and is dominated by a large pear tree. Other planting beds include species such as Ficus carica, narcissus, agapanthus, amaryllis, pelargonium, callistemon, agonis, baeckia and a number of ground covers.

== See also ==
- Architecture of Melbourne
- Gardens in Victoria
- Lindsay family
- List of museums in Victoria
- List of Harold Desbrowe-Annear buildings
- List of places on the Victorian Heritage Register in the City of Frankston
