= Ian Scrimshaw =

Australian rules footballer

Personal information
- Full name: Ian Leslie Scrimshaw
- Born: 24 December 1954 (age 71)
- Original team: Blackburn
- Height: 185 cm (6 ft 1 in)
- Weight: 86 kg (190 lb)

Playing career^{1}
Years	Club	Games (Goals)
1974–1975	Hawthorn	19 (20)
1976–1981	Richmond	40 (26)
Total		59 (46)
- ^{1} Playing statistics correct to the end of 1981.

Ian Leslie Scrimshaw (born 24 December 1954) is a former Australian rules footballer who played with Hawthorn and Richmond in the Victorian Football League (VFL).

Scrimshaw, a utility, was originally from Blackburn and played for the Hawthorn Under 19s before breaking into the senior team. He appeared in the opening four rounds of the 1974 VFL season, then played 15 games and kicked 17 goals for Hawthorn in 1975. Richmond secured Scrimshaw midway through the 1976 season and he played seven of a possible eight games to close out the year. This included a win over Essendon in which he had 24 kicks, starting as a half forward, but was let down by his conversion in front of goal, with one goal and five behinds. He remained with Richmond for five more seasons and suffered disappointment in 1980 when, despite playing in the club's qualifying final and semi final wins, was omitted from the team on grand final day, for Daryl Freame. In 1981 he won the reserves best and fairest award then in 1982 moved to Western Australia, where he played 5 games for East Perth.

Ian is the uncle of Gold Coast and Hawthorn player Jack Scrimshaw.
