= Syd Sixpence =

- Author: Joan Lindsay
- Illustrator: Rick Amor
- Language: English
- Genre: Children's literature
- Publisher: Kestrel, Puffin
- Publication date: 1982
- Publication place: Australia
- Pages: 65
- ISBN: 978-0-722-65776-8

Syd Sixpence is a 1982 children's book by Australian author Joan Lindsay, featuring illustrations by Rick Amor. Its plot follows an anthropomorphic sixpence coin who is thrown into the ocean, and his subsequent adventures on the ocean floor.

It was Lindsay's last published work before her death in 1984, and her only work of children's literature.

== Plot ==
The narrative follows Syd, an anthropomorphic Australian sixpence, who finds himself on the ocean floor. The book details his search for his friend, Tramline. While in the ocean, Syd meets a family of winkles who subsist on seaweed, encounters a fish who is a magician, and a performing octopus who kidnaps Syd and forces him into a performing circus, from which Syd must plot an escape.

== Release ==
The book was published in Australia by Kestrel in 1982, and was published again in November 1985 by Penguin's Puffin Storybook Series.
