= Jean Campbell (novelist) =

Australian novelist (1901–1984)

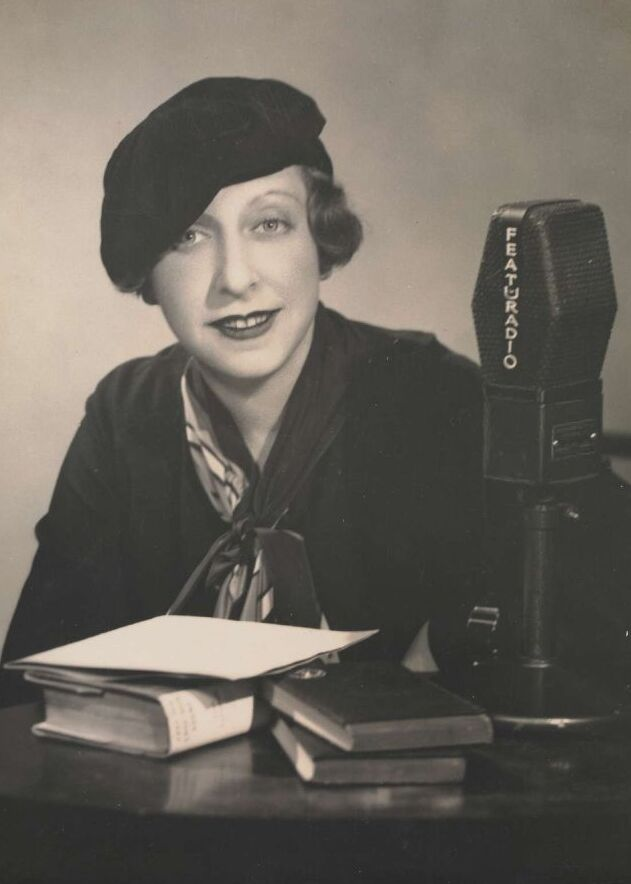
- Campbell c. 1935
- Born: Jean May Campbell; 20 May 1901; Melbourne, Victoria, Australia
- Died: 10 December 1984 (aged 83); St Kilda East, Victoria, Australia
- Occupation: Novelist

Jean May Campbell (20 May 1901 – 10 December 1984) was an Australian novelist and literary personality.

== Early life ==
Campbell was born in Melbourne on 20 May 1901, the daughter of Louise (née Bollinger) and John McNeil Campbell. Her father, born in Scotland, worked as a bank manager. She attended Presbyterian Ladies' College, Melbourne, where she led the debating team and was editor of the school magazine. Campbell briefly attended the University of Melbourne on a non-degree course. She became a licentiate of the Trinity College of Music. After taking actor Eileen O'Connor's classes and in 1921 passing the L.T.C.L. (Elocution) Exam with 86 marks, she worked as an elocution instructor. In 1925 she was hired by Louise Dyer for one of her regular divertissements at 'Kinnoul', Toorak, an Omar Khayyam party in which Campbell appeared as The Beloved.

== Career ==
Campbell's unpublished first novel Plato the Impossible was written while she was a student, for a contest run by C. J. De Garis. She performed in radio plays in the early 1930s, including The Grand Cham's Diamond by Allan Monkhouse, on 3AR, and as Mrs Yobb in a Herbert Swears work on 3LO, both broadcast in the same week. In 1932 she performed in J. R. Lester's Just a Minute at the Kelvin Hall, 55 Collins Place.

In 1933, Campbell's work Brass & Cymbals was published by Hutchinson, studying "the strains experienced by a Jewish immigrant family in Melbourne". Hutchinson published four further novels – Lest We Lose Our Edens (1935), Greek Key Pattern (1935), The Red Sweet Wine (1937), and The Babe Wise (1939), its title taken from Edwin Arnold's poem "The Light of Asia" — which shared in common an urban setting and ethnically diverse characters. Campbell was a prominent literary personality, making frequent appearances in newspapers and magazines contributing art criticism to both The Courier-Mail and The Advertiser.

During World War II, Campbell was employed as a censorship officer in the Department of Defence and Department of Information. She wrote fourteen anonymous pulp fiction romances between 1943 and 1945, which were published by the New Century Press in Sydney. She was awarded a Commonwealth Literary Fund fellowship in 1947 to a write a novel about "a neglected Melbourne adolescent boy", however the work – titled Runt – was never published.

== Notability ==
Frequently mentioned in the Australian pre-WW2 press, Smith's Weekly profiled Campbell as a "successful young lady from East Melbourne" who was "gifted with a quick and slightly acidulous wit," and who "bases her books on the premises that true love does exist."

Campbell was state president of the Fellowship of Australian Writers from 1954 to 1955 and was also secretary of the Melbourne Little Theatre. In 1955 she helped organise a book week for the inaugural Moomba Festival, together with Andrew Fabinyi and Lina Bryans, whose 1940 portrait of her The Babe Is Wise is in the National Gallery of Victoria. An actor in plays including the Little Theatre's Queer Cattle (1940), in her later years, Campbell appeared in a number of art films, including three by Paul Cox, and she is the subject of Mark Strizic's 1950 photographic portrait held in the NGV. She narrated his short documentary We Are All Alone My Dear (1975) about life in her retirement village.

== Personal life ==
In 1921, aged twenty, Campbell became the mistress of John Rose Gorton, a businessman whose son John Grey Gorton became prime minister of Australia. She lived intermittently with the older Gorton at his Mystic Park estate until his death in 1936. She died in St Kilda East, Victoria, on 10 December 1984, aged 83.
