= Rod Appleton =

Australian rules footballer

Personal information
- Born: 19 May 1953 (age 73)
- Original team: Blackburn, Victoria
- Height: 168 cm (5 ft 6 in)
- Weight: 62 kg (137 lb)

Playing career^{1}
Years	Club	Games (Goals)
1975	Fitzroy	5 (2)
- ^{1} Playing statistics correct to the end of 1975.

Rod Appleton (born 19 May 1953) is a former Australian rules footballer, who played for the Fitzroy Football Club in the Victorian Football League (VFL).
