= Mary Cockburn Mercer =

Australian artist (1882–1963)

- Born: 19 April 1882; Almerston, Scotland
- Died: 14 August 1963 (aged 81); Aubagne, France
- Known for: Painting
- Partner: Alexander Charles Robinson

Mary Cockburn Mercer (1882–1963) was an Australian painter. She spent the 1920s and 1930s in Europe, and the 1940s in Melbourne, Australia. Her final years were spent in France. She exhibited with the Contemporary Art Society in Australia.

== Biography ==
Mercer was born in Almerston, Scotland on 19 April 1882. She spent her childhood in Victoria, Australia. After World War I, Mercer arrived in the Montparnasse section of Paris, where she became acquainted with Pablo Picasso, Marc Chagall, Marie Laurencin, Jules Pascin and Kees van Dongen. Mercer recounted nostalgia for French cooking when painting, eventually leaving Australia to live in other parts of France, Italy, Spain, and Tahiti.

In 1938 Mercer returned to Australia, settling in Melbourne. There she associated with George Bell, William Frater, Lina Bryans and Arnold Shore. She also renewed her friendship with Janet Cumbrae Stewart, who she previously met in Paris in the 1920s. While in Melbourne, Mercer took art classes from George Bell and later taught at her private studio, where her students included Colin McCahon, Cumbrae Stewart and Lina Bryans.

In 1939 Janet Cumbrae Stewart made a portrait of her and it is in the National Gallery of Victoria.

In the 1940s Mercer exhibited at the Contemporary Art Society in Melbourne.

In 1953, Mercer returned to France and died there on 14 August 1963.

== Legacy ==
In 2017-2018 Mercer was included in the Australian National Trust show Intrepid Women – Australian women artists in Paris 1900-1950.

A group of Mercer's watercolour paintings and drawings from the 1940s were found as a part of a curatorial restructure between The Department of Australian Prints and Drawings in 1999.

in 2022 Mercer was featured in the exhibition QUEER: Stories from the NGV Collection.

Mercer's frank depiction of sexuality is notable within the Australian LGBTQI community.
