= Jack Scrimshaw =

Australian rules footballer (born 1998)

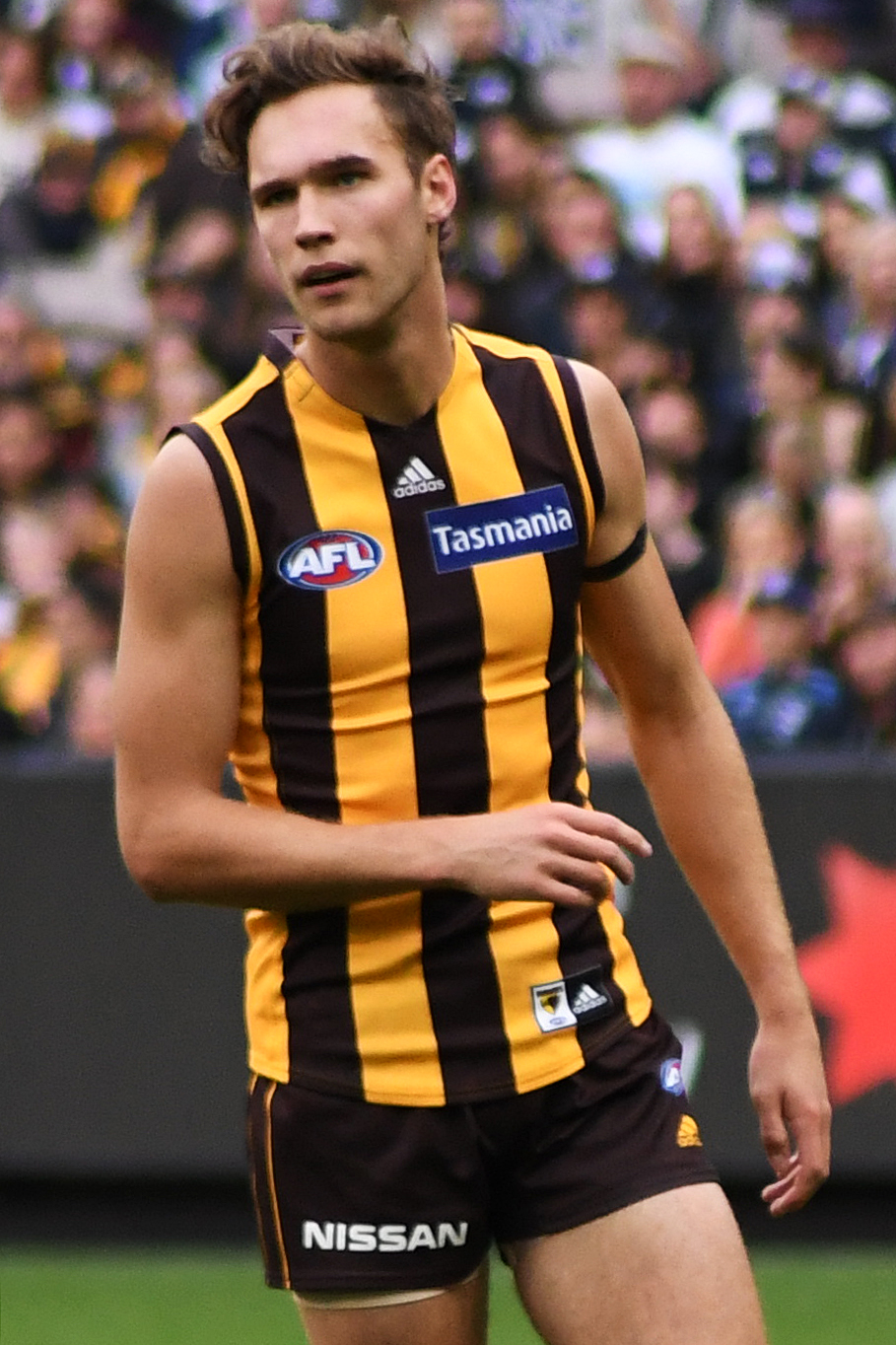
- Scrimshaw playing for Hawthorn in 2019

Personal information
- Full name: Jack Scrimshaw
- Born: 4 September 1998 (age 28)
- Original team: Sandringham Dragons (TAC Cup)
- Draft: No. 7, 2016 national draft
- Debut: Round 18, 2017, Gold Coast vs. Western Bulldogs, at Cazaly's Stadium
- Height: 194 cm (6 ft 4 in)
- Weight: 90 kg (198 lb)
- Position: Defender

Club information
- Current club: Hawthorn
- Number: 14

Playing career^{1}
Years	Club	Games (Goals)
2017–2018	Gold Coast	4 (0)
2019–	Hawthorn	125 (11)
Total		129 (11)
- ^{1} Playing statistics correct to the end of 2026.

Career highlights
- VFL premiership player: 2026

Jack Scrimshaw (born 4 September 1998) is a professional Australian rules footballer playing for the Hawthorn Football Club in the Australian Football League (AFL).

== Early career ==
Jack Scrimshaw as a junior played football with the Beaumaris Football Club in the South Metro Junior Football League. He later played for Sandringham Dragons in the elite TAC Cup. He also played for his school Haileybury, under the guidance of AFL Hall of Famer Matthew Lloyd. Talent scouts liked the dash and the plenty of X-Factor he displayed as a versatile and accurate left-footer. At 193 centimetres he had the height to demand attention. Scrimshaw played on the wing during the TAC championships and while he can move forward he looked most at home in defence.

== AFL career ==
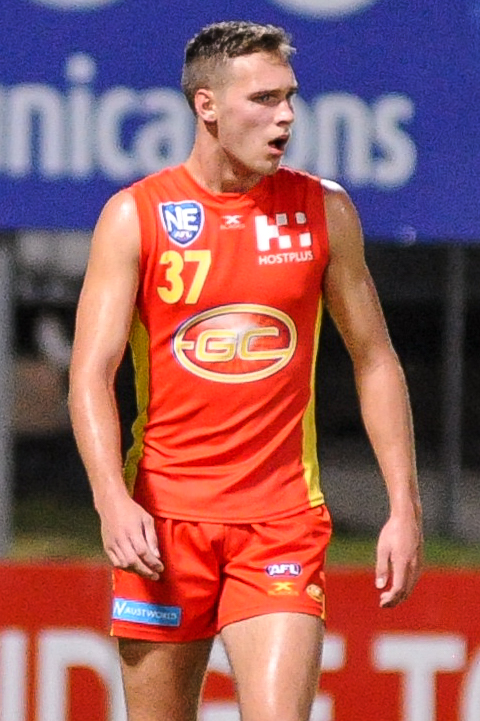
Scrimshaw playing for Gold Coast's NEAFL team in May 2017

He was drafted by Gold Coast with their second selection and seventh overall in the 2016 national draft. He made his debut in the fifty-four point loss to the Western Bulldogs at Cazaly's Stadium in round eighteen of the 2017 season.

Scrimshaw was unable to break into the Gold Coast senior side after the departure of coach, Rodney Eade and list manager Scott Clayton and several other coaches and support staff. Scrimshaw averaged 23 disposals in the NEAFL 2018 season. During that time he suffered a broken cheekbone and later had concussion. At the end of the 2018 season Scrimshaw requested a trade to a Victorian-based club. On 16 October, he was officially traded to Hawthorn.

Scrimshaw changed his guernsey number from 35 to 14 before the 2020 season.

== Family ==
Jack's uncle Ian Scrimshaw played with Hawthorn and Richmond in the 1970s and 80s. His father David Scrimshaw was also on Hawthorn's playing list during the late 1970s, but didn't play any senior VFL matches.

== Statistics ==
Updated to the end of 2026.

Legend
G	Goals	K	Kicks	D	Disposals	T	Tackles
B	Behinds	H	Handballs	M	Marks

Season	Team	No.	Games	Totals							Averages (per game)							Votes
Season	Team	No.	Games	G	B	K	H	D	M	T	G	B	K	H	D	M	T	Votes
2017	Gold Coast	37	4	0	0	25	15	40	16	3	0.0	0.0	6.3	3.8	10.0	4.0	0.8	0
2019	Hawthorn	35	10	0	1	86	74	160	41	18	0.0	0.1	8.6	7.4	16.0	4.1	1.8	0
2020 (Note: The 2020 season was played with 17 home-and-away matches per team (down from 22) and 16-minute quarters with time on (down from 20-minute quarters with time on) due to the impact of the COVID-19 pandemic.)	Hawthorn	14	13	0	0	122	82	204	51	23	0.0	0.0	9.4	6.3	15.7	3.9	1.8	0
2021	Hawthorn	14	20	4	2	249	163	412	127	29	0.2	0.1	12.5	8.2	20.6	6.4	1.5	1
2022	Hawthorn	14	20	3	3	233	147	380	115	25	0.2	0.2	11.7	7.4	19.0	5.8	1.3	0
2023	Hawthorn	14	16	4	1	157	119	276	85	26	0.3	0.1	9.8	7.4	17.3	5.3	1.6	0
2024	Hawthorn	14	24	0	0	283	151	434	142	37	0.0	0.0	11.8	6.3	18.1	5.9	1.5	0
2025	Hawthorn	14	16	0	0	126	93	219	72	38	0.0	0.0	7.9	5.8	13.7	4.5	2.4	0
2026	Hawthorn	14	6	0	0	52	52	104	28	9	0.0	0.0	8.7	8.7	17.3	4.7	1.5	0
Career			129	11	7	1333	896	2229	677	208	0.1	0.1	10.3	6.9	17.3	5.2	1.6	1

== Honours and achievements ==
Team

- McClelland Trophy (Hawthorn): 2024
- VFL premiership player (Box Hill): 2026
- TAC Cup premiership (Sandringham Dragons): 2016
