= Judah Waten =

Australian novelist

- Born: Judah Leon Waten; 29 July 1911; Odessa, Russian Empire
- Died: 29 July 1985 (aged 74); Melbourne, Australia
- Occupations: Writer, novelist
- Writing career
- Notable works: Alien Son (1952); Distant Land (1964)

Judah Leon Waten AM (29 July 1911 – 29 July 1985) was an Australian novelist who was at one time seen as the voice of Australian migrant writing.

== Life and career ==
Born in Odessa to a Russian-Jewish family, after a brief sojourn in Palestine, Judah Waten arrived in Western Australia in 1914, where the family settled in Midland Junction, before shifting to Perth. He attended Christian Brothers' College, Perth and, moving to Melbourne in 1926, University High School, Melbourne. He joined the Communist Party of Australia while still at school. Between 1931 and 1933, he visited Europe, where he engaged in left-wing political activities in England, and spent three months in Wormwood Scrubs Prison.

He wrote novels, short stories and a history of the Great Depression in Australia. He is best known for two books, his autobiographical novel, Alien Son, first published in 1952 and for Distant Land, a story about a Yiddish-speaking Polish couple, the husband a former Talmudic prodigy turned intellectual and his wife Shoshanah, as they struggle to recreate and conserve their Jewish culture in a strange land. He travelled to the Soviet Union several times, once with Manning Clark and James Devaney. He was involved in the Realist Writers Group, International PEN, the Fellowship of Australian Writers and served on the Literature Board of the Australia Council.

In 1967, he became a member of the National Committee of the Communist Party. However, he left the party in 1972 to join the pro-Soviet Socialist Party of Australia.

In 1985 he died on his birthday in Heidelberg, and was survived by his wife, who was of Scottish descent, and their daughter.

== Honours and awards ==
In 1979 he was awarded membership of the Order of Australia.

In 1985 he was posthumously awarded the Patrick White Award.

== Bibliography ==
Novels

- Alien Son (Angus & Robertson, 1952)
- The Unbending (Australasian Book Society, 1954)
- Shares in Murder (Australasian Book Society, 1957)
- Time of Conflict (Australasian Book Society, 1961)
- Distant Land (F. W. Cheshire, 1964)
- Season of Youth (F. W. Cheshire, 1966)
- So Far No Further (Wren Publishing, 1971)
- Scenes of Revolutionary Life (Angus & Robertson, 1982)

Non-fiction

- The Depression Years, 1929-1939 (F. W. Cheshire, 1971, Australia Since the Camera series)

Memoir

- From Odessa to Odessa: The Journey of an Australian Writer (F. W. Cheshire, 1969)
- "My two literary careers", essay (Southerly, 1971)
- "Why I came home - naked - fifty years ago", essay (The Bulletin, 24 April 1984)
