= The Australian Ugliness =

Book by Robin Boyd

The Australian Ugliness by Robin Boyd
- First edition
- Author: Robin Boyd
- Language: English
- Publisher: F. W. Cheshire, Melbourne
- Publication date: 1960
- Publication place: Australia
- Media type: Print (Paperback)
- Pages: 229 pp

The Australian Ugliness is a 1960 book by Australian architect Robin Boyd. Boyd investigates visual pollution in Australian aesthetic, in relation to architecture and the suburbs. In the text he coins the term "featurism" to describe the state of Australian architectural design. Boyd proposes that education in design, landscaping and architecture can be a means to resolve the ugliness he observed.

== Summary ==
The book can be seen as an "attack" on, or criticism of, Australia's built landscape.

Boyd's three main criticisms stem from three ideas: the Australian obsession with "featurism" with a fixation on parts rather than the whole, the use of building materials and styles that are unsympathetic to the country's landscape/climate, and the culling of trees in order to "divert" drains, prevent leaf clogging and other immaterial issues. Boyd's belief that trees are not a feature, or a byproduct of design, but rather a fundamental landscaping necessity, something unrecognised by Australian homeowners and city planners who opt for low maintenance.

It also channeled the "cultural cringe", as well as drawing comparisons to the man-made landscapes of North America and to a lesser extent Europe. Boyd's belief was that because Australia was in its infancy at the time of his critique, it had not developed a strong historic character like Europe, and thus its architectural landscape was a bombardment of confused style and mixed ideas.

== Reception and influence ==
The Australian Ugliness was first published by F. W. Cheshire, Melbourne. That firm's publishing director, Andrew Fabinyi, approved the book for publication in defiance of the "lugubrious advice of sundry experts" who claimed the book "had an impossible title and would not have public anyway". The book sold over 10,000 copies by early 1963.

After the book's first publication, Boyd was criticised for being "unpatriotic" by the Australian mainstream press. The book's Afterword acknowledges that it reads as a ‘rage’ and ‘diatribe’, and a 'satirical portrait'. As the years passed, the book became something of a classic and is now regarded as an important book regarding Australian design, culture and architecture.

The book opened up debate about design, architecture and urban planning in the country. It has received various reprints and adjustments over the years.

In the following years, Boyd's book inspired derivative and reactionary works, ranging from Donald Gazzard's more visual Australian Outrage (1966) and Look Here! Considering the Australian Environment (1968).

It was further examined in After The Australian Ugliness, a collection edited by Naomi Stead, published in 2020 by National Gallery of Victoria and Thames & Hudson Australia.
