= Picnic at Hanging Rock (novel) =

1967 novel by Joan Lindsay

- First edition cover
- Author: Joan Lindsay
- Language: English
- Genre: Historical novel
- Publisher: F. W. Cheshire; Penguin (paperback)
- Publication date: 1967
- Publication place: Australia
- Media type: Print (hardcover and paperback)
- Pages: 212 (first printing)

Picnic at Hanging Rock is a 1967 novel by Australian author Joan Lindsay. Set in Victoria, Australia in 1900, it is about a group of female boarding school students who vanish at Hanging Rock while on a Valentine's Day picnic, and the effects the disappearances have on the school and local community.

The novel was first published in Australia by Cheshire Publishing and was reprinted by Penguin in 1975. It is widely considered by critics to be one of the greatest Australian novels. In 2022, it was included on the "Big Jubilee Read" list of 70 books by Commonwealth authors, selected to celebrate the Platinum Jubilee of Elizabeth II.

It was adapted into a 1975 film of the same name, directed by Peter Weir.

== Overview ==
Although the events depicted in the novel are apparently entirely fictional, it is framed as though it were a true story, corroborated by ambiguous pseudohistorical references. Its unresolved conclusion has sparked significant public, critical, and scholarly analysis, and the narrative has become a part of Australia's national folklore as a result. Lindsay claimed to have written the novel over two weeks at her home Mulberry Hill in Baxter, on Victoria's Mornington Peninsula, after having successive dreams of the narrated events.

An excised final chapter of the novel was published posthumously as part of a book titled The Secret of Hanging Rock, which also included critical commentary and theories about the novel. Another book, titled The Murders at Hanging Rock, was published in 1980, proposing varying other interpretations.

== Plot ==
The novel begins with a brief foreword stating that whether the novel "is fact or fiction, my readers must decide for themselves" and implying that the events occurred.

At Appleyard College, a private boarding school for upper-class girls near Mount Macedon, Victoria, a picnic is being planned for the pupils under the supervision of Mrs. Appleyard, the school's headmistress. The picnic entails a day trip to Hanging Rock, on St Valentine's Day in 1900. One of the pupils, Sara, who is in trouble with Mrs. Appleyard, is not allowed to go. Sara's close friend Miranda goes without her.

When they arrive, the pupils relax and eat lunch. Afterwards Miranda goes to climb the monolith with classmates Edith, Irma, and Marion, despite being forbidden to do so. The girls' mathematics teacher, Greta McCraw, follows behind them separately. Miranda, Marion, and Irma climb still higher in a trance-like state while Edith flees in terror; she returns to the picnic in hysterics, disoriented and with no memory of what occurred. Miss McCraw cannot be accounted for either except for being seen by Edith, who passed her ascending the rock in her underwear. The school scours the rock in search of the three girls and their teacher, but they are not found.

The disappearances provoke much local concern and international sensation with rape, abduction, and murder being assumed as probable explanations. Several organized searches of the picnic grounds and the area surrounding the rock itself turn up nothing. Meanwhile the pupils, teachers, and other staff of the school, as well as members of the community, grapple with the riddle-like events.

Mike Fitzhubert, an Englishman who was picnicking at the grounds on the same day, embarks on a private search of the rock and discovers Irma, unconscious and on the verge of death. When he fails to return from his search, he is found in an unexplained daze, sitting at the rock with Irma, by his friend and uncle's coachman, Albert Crundall.

Concerned parents begin withdrawing their daughters from the prestigious school, prompting various staff to leave; the handyman and maid quit their jobs and the French instructor, Mlle. Dianne de Poitiers, announces that she will be getting married and leaving as well. A junior governess at the school, Dora Lumley, also leaves with her brother Reg, only for both to be killed in a hotel fire. Amidst the unrest both in and around the school Sara vanishes, only to be found days later, having apparently died by suicide (her body being found right beneath the school's tower, with her head "crushed beyond recognition"). Mrs. Appleyard, distraught over the events that have occurred, kills herself by jumping from a peak on Hanging Rock.

In a pseudo-historical afterword purportedly extracted from a 1913 Melbourne newspaper article, it is written that both the school and the Woodend Police Station, where records of the investigation were kept, were destroyed by a bush fire in the summer of 1901. In 1903 rabbit hunters came across a lone piece of frilled calico at the rock, believed to have been part of the dress of the governess, Miss Greta McCraw, but neither she nor the girls were ever found.

=== Excised final chapter ===
According to her editor, Sandra Forbes, Lindsay's original draft of the novel included a final chapter in which the mystery was resolved. At her editor's suggestion Lindsay removed it prior to publication. Chapter Eighteen, as it is known, was published posthumously as a standalone book in 1987 as The Secret of Hanging Rock by Angus & Robertson Publishing.

The chapter opens with Edith fleeing back to the picnic area while Miranda, Irma, and Marion push on. Each girl begins to experience dizziness and feels as if she is "being pulled from the inside out." A woman suddenly appears climbing the rock in her underwear, shouting "Through!", and then faints. This woman is not referred to by name and is apparently a stranger to the girls, yet the narration suggests she is Miss McCraw. Miranda loosens the woman's corset to help revive her. Afterwards the girls remove their own corsets and throw them off the cliff.

The recovered woman points out that the corsets appear to hover in mid-air as if stuck in time and that they cast no shadows. She and the girls continue together. The girls then encounter what is described as "a hole in space", by which they physically enter a crack in the rock following a lizard; the unnamed woman disappears into the rock. Marion follows her, then Miranda, but when Irma's turn comes a balanced boulder (the hanging rock) slowly tilts and blocks the way. The chapter ends with Irma "tearing and beating at the gritty face on the boulder with her bare hands."

The missing material amounts to about 12 pages; the remainder of the publication The Secret at Hanging Rock contains discussion by other authors, including John Taylor and Yvonne Rousseau. The suspension of the corsets and description of the hole in space suggest that the girls have encountered some sort of time warp, which is compatible with Lindsay's fascination with and emphasis on clocks and time in the novel.

== Conception ==
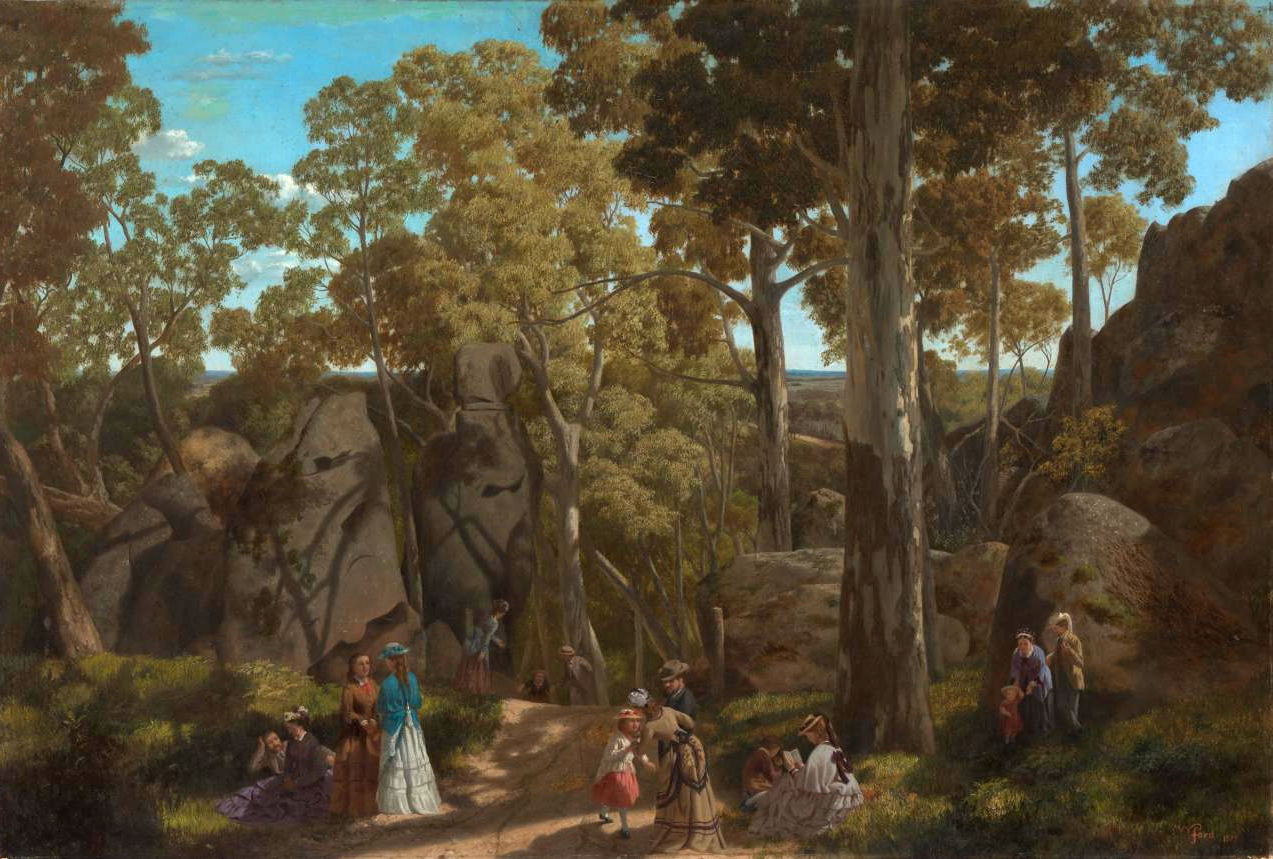
William Ford's 1875 painting At the Hanging Rock, held at the National Gallery of Victoria, was the basis of the novel's title; in addition to her writing, Lindsay was also a professional painter and influenced by visual art. (Note: Lindsay spent the majority of her early life studying art, and was a graduate of the National Gallery of Victoria Art School. Donald Barrett further notes Lindsay's role as a painter as a potential source of influence in her writing, specifically in Picnic at Hanging Rock.)

Lindsay claimed to have based the novel on an idea she had in a dream. In a 2017 article in The Age it was noted: "The dream had centred on a summer picnic at a place called Hanging Rock, which Joan knew well from her childhood holidays. Joan told Rae [her housekeeper] that the dream had felt so real that when she awoke at 7.30am, she could still feel the hot summer breeze blowing through the gum trees and she could still hear the peals of laughter and conversation of the people she'd imagined, and their gaiety and lightness of spirit as they set out on their joyful picnic expedition."

According to her housekeeper at the time, the events of the novel were dreamt by Lindsay successively. Several years after the publication of the novel, Lindsay would recount the experience of writing it as such: "Picnic at Hanging Rock really was an experience to write, because I was just impossible when I was writing it. I just sort of thought about it all night and in the morning I would go straight up and sit on the floor, papers all around me, and just write like a demon!"

The novel was written over a total of two weeks at Lindsay's home in Mulberry Hill. In thinking of a title, Lindsay recalled the painting At the Hanging Rock by William Ford, which had hung in her husband Daryl's office at the National Gallery of Victoria, and chose to incorporate it into the title as it was "simple and pretty, and belied the horrors hidden within." In an interview after Lindsay's death, academic Terrence O'Neill, who had befriended Lindsay, remarked the supernatural elements of the novel: "It was clear that [Joan] was interested in Spiritualism, and longed for some spiritual dimension in her life, but she didn't feel safe bringing that side of her out in front of her husband. So I think she channelled it into her writing. I know she was very interested in Arthur Conan Doyle and his belief in and theories about Spiritualism, nature and the existence of spirits."

The novel was imported for sale in the United States and would receive its first publication there in 2014 by Penguin Random House. In the United Kingdom the novel was printed in several editions by Vintage, in 1998 and 2013.

== Basis in reality ==
Did I think the story was true? We did talk about this. But the truth for Joan was different to the rest of us. She was never straightforward about it. I think I decided in the end that it was a great work of the imagination. I see it as a book of place; a painterly book that captures the atmosphere of the Australian bush.

— Sandra Forbes, editor, on the novel's truth claim

Picnic at Hanging Rock is written in the form of a true story, and even begins and ends with a pseudohistorical prologue and epilogue, reinforcing the mystery that has generated significant critical and public interest since its publication in 1967. However, while the geological feature, Hanging Rock, and the several towns mentioned are actual places near Mount Macedon, the story itself is entirely fictitious. Lindsay had done little to dispel the myth that the story is based on truth, in many interviews either refusing to confirm it was entirely fiction, or hinting that parts of the book were fictitious and that others were not. The dates named in the novel do not correspond to actual dates in the 1900 calendar. For instance, Valentine's Day, 14 February 1900, occurred on a Wednesday, not a Saturday; similarly, Easter Sunday fell on 15 April in 1900, not on 29 March.

Appleyard College was to some extent based on Clyde Girls' Grammar School at St Kilda East, Victoria, which Joan Lindsay attended as a day-girl while in her teens. Incidentally, in 1919 this school was transferred to the town of Woodend, Victoria, about 8 km southwest of Hanging Rock. The fictional site of the college was described in the book as having an eastward view of Mount Macedon on the Bendigo Road. This would place it roughly 5.8 km south of Woodend. The total trip to Hanging Rock was about 12 km.

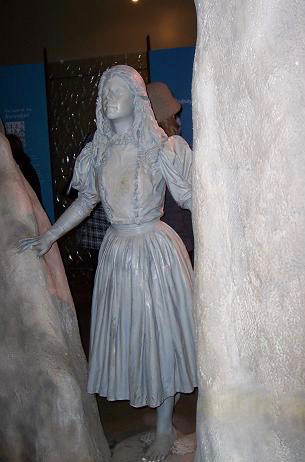
Statue of fictional Miranda character at the Hanging Rock visitors' centre.

When asked in a 1974 interview about whether the novel was based in truth, Lindsay responded: "Well, it was written as a mystery and it remains a mystery. If you can draw your own conclusions, that's fine, but I don't think that it matters. I wrote that book as a sort of atmosphere of a place, and it was like dropping a stone into the water. I felt that story, if you call it a story—that the thing that happened on St. Valentine's Day went on spreading, out and out and out, in circles." The unresolved mystery of the disappearances in the novel aroused so much lasting public interest that in 1980 a book of hypothetical solutions (by Yvonne Rousseau) was published, called The Murders at Hanging Rock.

== Publication history ==
The novel was first published on 1 November 1967 by F. W. Cheshire, Melbourne, under the aegis of Andrew Fabinyi, with an acclaimed "dream-like" cover design by Alison Forbes. It was reprinted in paperback by Penguin Books' Australian division in 1970, and again in 1975, in conjunction with the release of the film adaptation. A hardback illustrated edition was also printed in Australia in 1987, also by Penguin. It would receive another reprinting by Penguin Books Australia in 2013 as part of the "Penguin Australian Classics" series.

== Critical analysis ==
Much of the critical and scholarly interest in the novel has centred on its mysterious conclusion, as well as its depiction of Australia's natural environment in contrast with the Victorian population of the British colony established in 1851. (Note: Both Donald Bartlett and Kathleen Steele are significantly interested in the role of the Australian Bush as it is depicted in Picnic at Hanging Rock, specifically the interaction between the "untamed" natural environment and the colony of Victoria. Steele specifically addresses the notion of Australia as a "haunted site ... full of unseen presences.") In 1987, literary scholar Donald Bartlett drew comparisons between Lindsay's treatment of the rock and that of the fictitious Marabar Caves in E. M. Forster's A Passage to India, which has been interpreted as a metaphor for Pan, the Greek god of the wild: "There is more, of course, to A Passage to India than Pan motifs, for example symbols such as the snake, the wasp and the undying worm, not to mention the vast panorama of India's religions. But I believe it probable that Joan Lindsay consciously borrowed the elements [from A Passage to India]."

Literary scholar Kathleen Steele argues in her essay "Fear and Loathing in the Australian Bush: Gothic Landscapes in Bush Studies and Picnic at Hanging Rock" that the novel's treatment of landscape and its missing characters is reflective of Australia's national history and the relationship between the rock and the Aboriginal population: "The silence surrounding Aborigines, and the manner in which Europeans foregrounded 'geographical, historical and cultural difference and discontinuity,' yet denied Aborigines either presence or history, created a gothic consciousness of 'something deeply unknowable and terrifying in the Australian landscape.'" ... "Lindsay provokes a reflection on the understanding of Australia as an un-peopled land where nothing of consequence occurred until the British gave it a history."

== Adaptations ==
=== Film ===
The first film adaptation of the book was a short by Tony Ingram, a fourteen-year-old filmmaker, who got permission from Joan Lindsay to adapt her book as The Day of Saint Valentine. However, only about ten minutes of footage was filmed before the rights were optioned to Peter Weir for his more famous feature-length version, and the production was permanently shelved. The completed footage is included on some DVD releases of Weir's film.

The feature film version of Picnic at Hanging Rock premiered at the Hindley Cinema Complex in Adelaide on 8 August 1975. It became an early film of the Australian New Wave and is arguably Australia's first international hit film.

=== Theatre ===
Picnic at Hanging Rock was adapted by playwright Laura Annawyn Shamas in 1987 and published by Dramatic Publishing Company. Subsequently, it has had many productions in the US, Canada, and Australia. There have also been musical adaptations of the novel.

In 2007 a youth musical adaptation by Robert Johns (adapter) and Brian Spence (composer) premiered at Chichester's Minerva Theatre in West Sussex, UK.

A stage-musical adaptation, with book, music, and lyrics by Daniel Zaitchik, was scheduled to open in New York City in the fall of 2012. The musical received a 2007 staged reading at New York's Lincoln Center, and further workshop development at the 2009 O'Neill Theater Center National Music Theater Conference. The musical had its world premiere on 28 February 2014 at Weber State University in Ogden, Utah under the direction of Jim Christian.

In 2016, the Malthouse Theatre in Melbourne showed a stage adaptation dramatized by Tom Wright and directed by Matthew Lutton. The production was later staged at the Royal Lyceum Theatre in Edinburgh, Scotland in January 2017. The overseas production worked alongside the original Australian theatre makers Malthouse Theatre, Melbourne as well as Black Swan State Theatre Company. The Malthouse Theatre presented an encore season of Picnic at Hanging Rock in early 2018.

=== Radio ===
An abridged form of the book was read by New Zealand actress Lisa Harrow on BBC Radio Four in 1996 in its Book at Bedtime slot. In 2010, BBC Radio 4 broadcast a radio adaptation. The cast included Simon Burke, Penny Downie, Anna Skellern and Andi Snelling.

=== Miniseries ===
On 6 September 2016, it was announced that Fremantle Media and pay-TV broadcaster Foxtel were producing a six-part miniseries, to be broadcast in 2017. The miniseries became available on Amazon Prime streaming on 25 May 2018, and is currently (2026) available.

== See also ==
- Legend tripping
- Tasmanian Gothic

== Works cited ==
- Barrett, Donald (1987). "Picnicking with E.M. Forster, Joan Lindsay et al". Linq. 5 (1). James Cook University: 79–86.
- Benson, Eugene, ed. (2005). Encyclopedia of Post-Colonial Literatures in English. Routledge. ISBN 978-0-415-27885-0.
- Skidmore, Stephanie; Clark, Ian D. (2014). "Hanging Rock Recreation Reserve". An Historical Geography of Tourism in Victoria, Australia: Case Studies. Walter de Gruyter & Co. ISBN 978-3-11-037010-2.
- Steele, Kathleen (2010). "Fear and Loathing in the Australian Bush: Gothic Landscapes in Bush Studies and Picnic at Hanging Rock" (PDF). Colloquy (20). Monash University.
