= Daryl Lindsay =

Australian artist (1889–1976)

Sir Ernest Daryl Lindsay
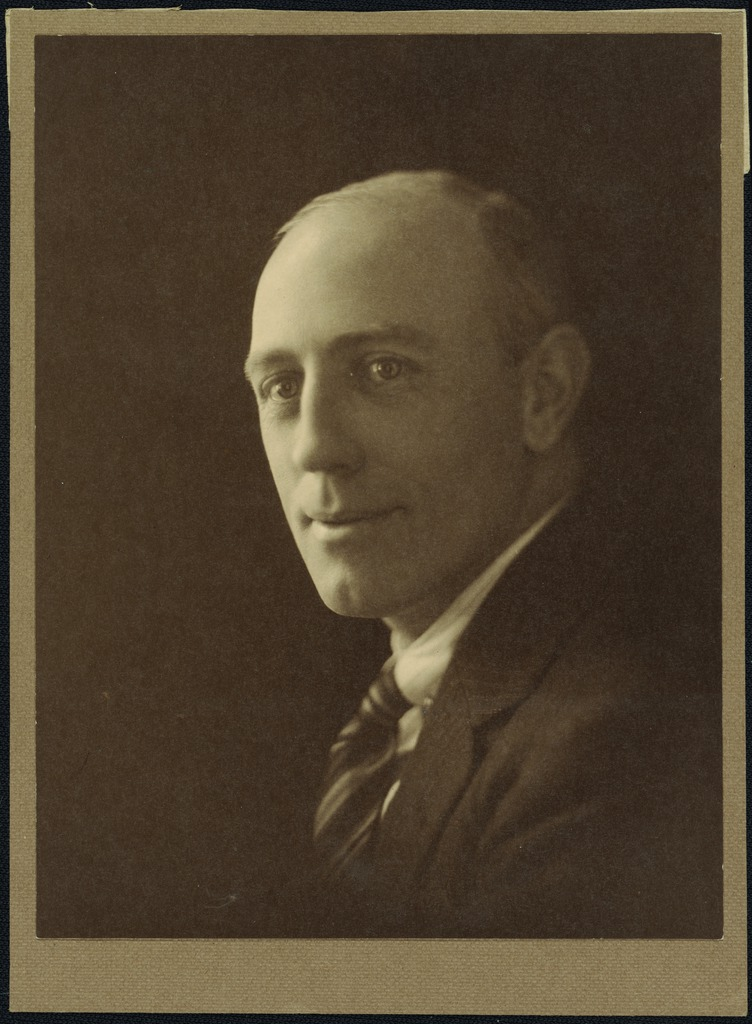
- Lindsay, c. 1930
- Born: Ernest Daryl Lindsay; 31 December 1889; Creswick, Colony of Victoria
- Died: 25 December 1976 (aged 86); Mornington, Victoria, Australia
- Occupations: Artist and art gallery Director
- Spouse: Joan à Beckett Weigall (m. 1922)

Sir Ernest Daryl Lindsay (31 December 1889 – 25 December 1976) was an Australian artist and Art Gallery Director

== Early life ==
He was the ninth of the ten children born to Anglo-Irish surgeon Robert Charles Alexander Lindsay and his wife Jane Elizabeth Lindsay (the daughter of the Rev Thomas Williams), of Creswick, Victoria. Daryl and his brothers Percy (the eldest), Lionel, Norman, and Ruby all achieved distinction in the arts.

On leaving school Daryl initially worked as a bank clerk before becoming a jackaroo at the age of 18. He worked at Yeranbah, on the Narran River, and took part in overlanding 9000 Shorthorn from Hebel to Camooweal. Eventually he became an overseer at Trawalla, near Ballarat.

== Military service ==
On the outbreak of World War I he enlisted as a driver in the Royal Australian Army Service Corps and served in France. After his brother Reg was killed on 31 December 1916, Daryl's brother-in-law, Will Dyson, Australia’s first official War Artist, arranged for Daryl to become his batman.

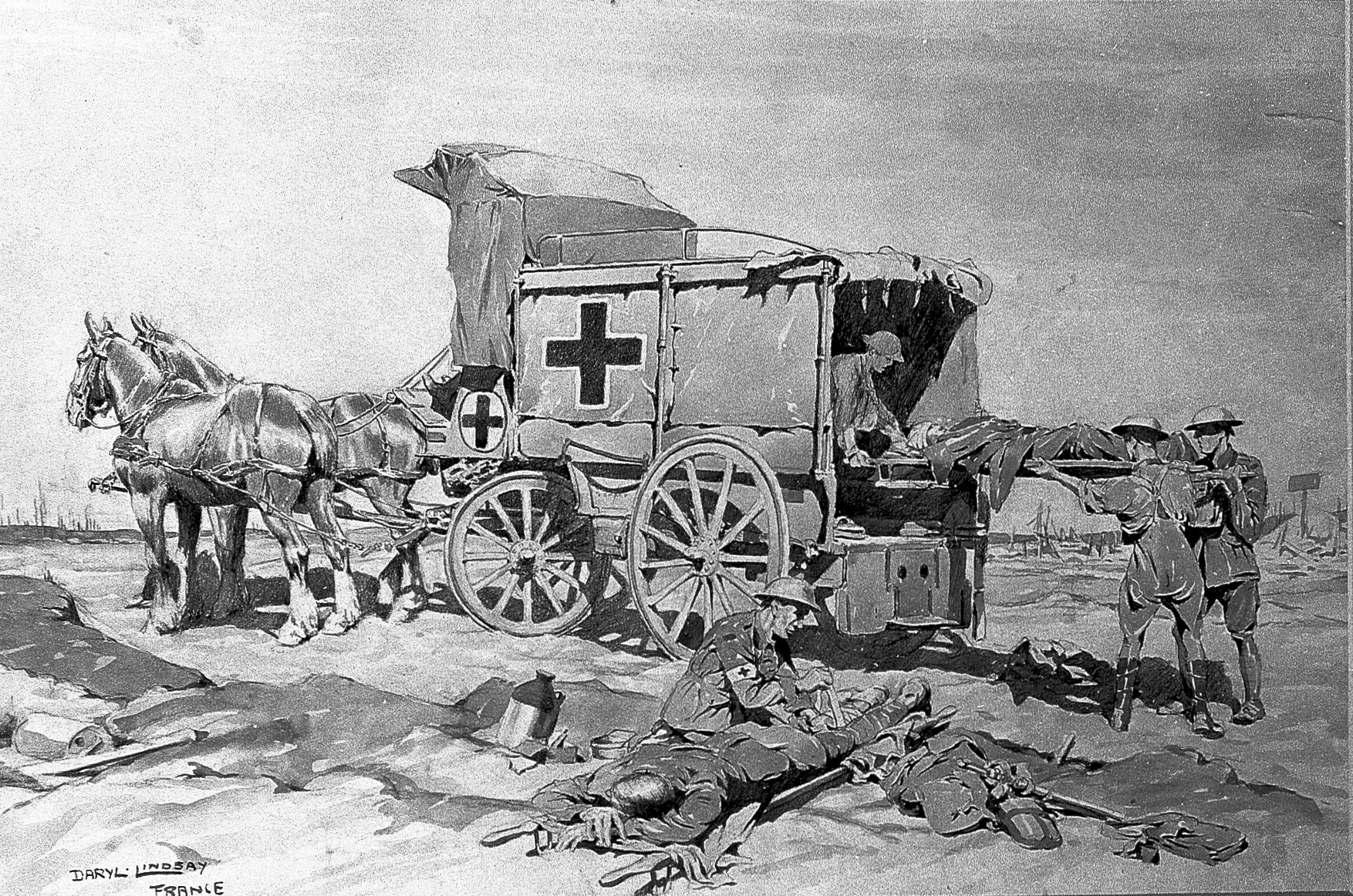
World War One; transportation of the wounded Wellcome L0009186

Under Dyson’s encouragement Daryl began to draw. In 1918, when he was on leave in England, he was asked to draw medical diagrams for soldiers undertaking facial reconstruction. As a result he was appointedLieutenant D./E. Lindsay, the official "medical artist" at the specialist military hospital at Sidcup, in Kent. In this position he made a substantial contribution to the advancement of military reconstructive surgery with the extensive set of images he produced for Sir Harold Gillies.

== Formal studies ==
One of the surgeons Daryl Lindsay worked with at Sidcup was Henry Tonks, who combined his war work as a surgeon with his position as professor at the Slade School of Art in London. Through Tonks, Lindsay was able to study part-time at the Slade while continuing his work making drawings for the plastic surgeons

At the end of the War he returned to London he where relished, and learnt from, the relaxed company of artists. The extended conversations of Tonks, Will Dyson and Ruby Lindsay became a part of his education. It ended in 1919 when Ruby died of the Spanish Influenza and Daryl Lindsay returned home to Australia.

After holding a successful exhibition of his wartime subjects in Melbourne, Lindsay returned to London. A letter of introduction from Sir Baldwin Spencer gave him access to art dealers and auction houses as well as the Print Room of the British Museum.

== Artistic Career ==
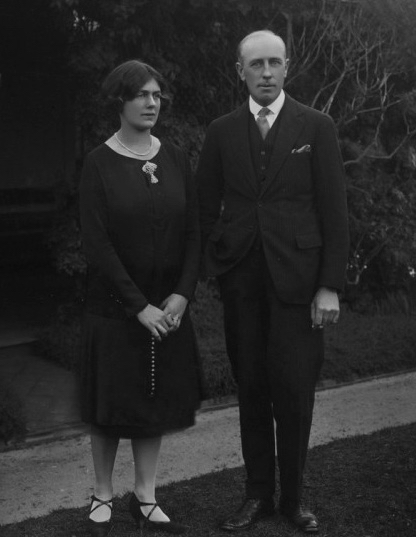
Joan and Daryl Lindsay

In 1922 he returned to Australia with his new wife, Joan à Beckett Weigall. After some years of living in Melbourne, they retreated to Baxter, where they built their house, Mulberry Hill, on the Mornington Peninsula. It was an ideal environment for a creative couple. After the Great Depression eliminated the market for art they were able to lease the house, and relocate to a modest cottage in Bacchus Marsh, where Daryl painted and Joan wrote. Joan Lindsay later wrote of this rural existence in her memoir, Time Without Clocks. Daryl found that his love of horses and horse racing gave him both subject matter and commissions to paint.

In 1936 when the "Colonel W. de Basil's Monte Carlo Russian Ballet" (i.e., the Ballets Russes) came to Australia, Lindsay became fascinated with the dancers, making studies of them both during rehearsals, and in their performances. He later published a book of these sketches, Back stage with the Covent Garden Russian ballet, and illustrated Arnold Haskell's memoirs, Dancing Round the World: Memoirs of an Attempted Escape from Ballet.

== Gallery Director ==
In 1939, Daryl Lindsay’s friend and neighbour, Sir Keith Murdoch, suggested he apply for the position of Keeper of Prints at the National Gallery of Victoria. Murdoch was less than happy with the Director, J.S. MacDonald, and three years later Lindsay became the Gallery’s Director, a position he held until 1956.

Thanks to the Felton Bequest, The National Gallery of Victoria had Australia’s richest collection of European art, but no expert curators. When he discovered that Ursula Hoff, a Rembrandt scholar, had come to Australia as a refugee, Lindsay arranged for her appointment to the print collection. Hoff’s scholarship was to reshape the collection. He persuaded the University of Melbourne to create Australia’s first department of Fine Arts, with a Chair of Art History funded by the Melbourne Herald, the newspaper owned by Keith Murdoch. This department has educated generations of Australian art historians and curators.

Joan Lindsay came to know the gallery and its collection well. One painting that intrigued her was William Ford's At the Hanging Rock (1875), which became the inspiration for her novel, Picnic at Hanging Rock.

In 1947 their concern for Australia’s disappearing architectural heritage led Daryl and Joan Lindsay to become instrumental in founding the National Trust of Victoria.

In 1953 Daryl Lindsay was appointed to the Commonwealth Art Advisory Board and served at its Chair from 1960 to 1969. As such he was instrumental in shaping Australian cultural policy in the post war decades. He was aware that the Gallery needed wider philanthropic support if it was to flourish. In 1947, with Keith Murdoch's support, he established the National Gallery Society.

Daryl Lindsay retired from the National Gallery of Victoria in 1956. On 31 May of that year he was knighted for "services to art".

He may have retired from regular employment, but Daryl Lindsay did not retire from public life. In one of his last acts as Australia's longest serving Prime Minister, Sir Robert Menzies commissioned him to chair a committee to plan a future Australian National Gallery. The Lindsay Report, as it came to be known, was tabled in Parliament in March 1966. The parameters set by Daryl Lindsay continue to shape the National Gallery’s collecting policies.

The development of the Ballarat Art Gallery became another interest in Daryl Lindsay’s retirement. As well as serving on its governing council for many years, he actively mentored the young curators who were appointed directors. Two of these, James Mollison and Ron Radford, were later appointed Director of the National Gallery of Australia.

Daryl Lindsay died on 25 December 1976. In 1984, after Joan died, Mulberry Hill was left to the National Trust

== Death ==
He died on Christmas Day 1976, in Mornington, Victoria, six days before his 87th birthday. He was survived by his wife. They had no children.

== Publications ==
- Back Stage with the Covent Garden Russian Ballet (Sydney: s.n., 1938?)
- F. Philipp and J. Stewart, eds., In Honour of Daryl Lindsay: Essays and Studies (Melbourne: Oxford University Press, 1964)
- The Leafy Tree: My Family (Melbourne: F. W. Cheshire, 1965).

== See also ==
- 1916 Pioneer Exhibition Game
