= Blackburn Football Club =

Names
- Nickname(s): The Panthers, The Burners

2023 season
- After finals: 6th
- Home-and-away season: 6th of 12
- Leading goalkicker: Patrick Lawlor (27 goals)
- Best and fairest: Kade Answerth

Club details
- Founded: 1903
- Colours
- Competition: Eastern Football Netball League
- Coach: Anthony Fagan _{Seniors} Paul Harte _{Reserves} Ash Brown _{Under 19's}
- Premierships: Seniors (12): 1910 • 1922 • 1930 • 1933 • 1935 • 1941 • 1950 • 1952 • 1959 • 1977 • 1980 • 2002 Reserves (10): 1936 • 1959 • 1965 • 1966 • 1969 • 1995 • 1996 • 2016 • 2022 • 2023 Under 19's (5): 2010 • 2013 • 2019 • 2022 • 2023
- Ground: Morton Park

Uniforms
Home	Away	Clash

Other information
- Official website: https://blackburnfc.com.au/

The Blackburn Football Club is an Australian rules football club located in Blackburn, Victoria. They play in Premier Division of the Eastern Football Netball League, fielding teams in the Seniors, Reserves and Under 19's competitions.

They are known as the "Panthers" or the "Burners", playing their home games at Morton Park.

== History ==
Football was played in the area as early as 1890 and the club held its first official AGM in 1903. Once formalised, it played in the Reporter Districts Football Association on the same oval used today.

In 1907 the club joined The Box Hill Reporter District Football Association, a football competition sponsored by a local Box Hill newspaper. In 1910 the club went through the season undefeated and won their first premiership. In 1922 the club won its second premiership with the Seniors, the club jumper at the time was black with a red hoop. Further premierships in this competition were in 1930, 1933 & 1935.

Blackburn transferred to the Eastern Suburban Football League in 1937 after standing down for a year after being rejected a transfer from the Ringwood District Football Association. The move was almost successful as they finished runners-up to Surrey Hills. They lost again in 1940 but premierships were to follow in 1941, 1950 & 1952.

Blackburn remained in the Eastern Suburban FL until it closed down in 1962. Half of the clubs joined the Croydon-Ferntree Gully Football League to form the Eastern District Football League while the rest went to the new SE Suburban FL.

The club entered Division 1 of the Eastern Football League in 2003, having won the Division 2 Premiership in 2002. It has remained in the top flight of the Eastern Football Netball League in the years since with their highest ladder finish being 3rd after the 2019 season, playing off in the Premier Division Grand Final.

Blackburn's jumper is black with red stripes. The club's senior jumper changed in 2008, with a white patch added to the back of the jumper with a black number, similar in style to AFL club Hawthorn.

== VFL/AFL players ==
- Jordan Lisle - Hawthorn, Brisbane Lions
- Tom Schneider - Hawthorn
- Bryan Wood - Richmond, Essendon
- Rod Appleton - Fitzroy
- Ian Scrimshaw - Hawthorn, Richmond
- Daniel McKenzie - St Kilda Football Club
- Ben Griffiths - Richmond
- Xavier O'Neill - West Coast Eagles
- Kynan Brown - Melbourne
- Ryley Stoddart - Sydney Swans
- Cooper Trembath - North Melbourne

== Theme song ==
We're a happy team at Blackburn,

We're the Mighty Fighting 'Burns, ( 2,3,4 ).

We love our club and we play to win,

Riding the bumps with a grin, at Blackburn.

Come what may you'll find us striving,

Teamwork is the thing that counts ( 2,3,4)

All for one and one for all,

The way we play at Blackburn,

We are the Mighty Fighting 'Burns.

*(Sung to the tune of ''The Yankee Doodle Boy'', and similar to AFL club Hawthorn).
