= Morton Park =

Sports ground in Victoria, Australia

Coordinates: 37°49′20″S 145°09′23″E

Morton Park is a football and cricket ground located on Central Road in the suburb of Blackburn, Victoria, Australia. The ground has two ovals, and is home to the local Blackburn football and cricket clubs.

The top oval is where the senior football and cricket sides play, while the junior teams play most of their home matches on the bottom oval. The bottom oval has four cricket nets, and both grounds run north–south (for both football and cricket). The Blackburn Football Club's Auskick program is conducted on the top oval. Morton Park is located along the Belgrave and Lilydale railway lines, and is near to St Thomas the Apostle Primary School, Blackburn Lake Primary School, Blackburn Lake, Blackburn Railway Station and the Blackburn Library. A children's playground is also located to the south east of the ground.
