= Lina Bryans =

Australian artist (1909–2000)

Lina Bryans OAM
- Born: Lina Hallenstein; 26 August 1909; Hamburg, Germany
- Died: 30 September 2000 (aged 91); Melbourne, Victoria, Australia
- Education: Mentor William (Jock) Frater and La Grande Chaumière
- Known for: Painting
- Movement: Modernism
- Awards: 1966 Crouch Prize

Lina Bryans OAM (26 August 1909 – 30 September 2000) was an Australian modernist painter.

== Life ==
Lina Bryans was born in Hamburg, Germany, on 26 August 1909, second daughter of wealthy prosperous Michaelis-Hallenstein family of industrialists, Australians Edward and Lina Hallenstein, who were then visiting Europe. The following year they settled in Toorak, Melbourne, Victoria, and Lina grew up moving between Australia, England and France. She used her knowledge of French to work as a translator. She married Baynham Bryans in 1931 and they had a son, Edward (24 June 1932 – 23 March 2010), who made his name as a newsreader on ABC radio and television. The marriage broke down and Lina moved to South Yarra in 1936. She met William (Jock) Frater and decided with his help and encouragement to become a painter. She'd had no involvement with art before.

== Early works ==
A modernist, Bryans was associated with Frater's circle which included Ada May Plante and Isabel Hunter Tweddle. Her first works were painted early in 1937 and Basil Burdett selected her Backyards, South Yarra in 1938 for the Herald Exhibition of Outstanding Pictures of 1937. Her work was included in Burdett's article in Studio (1938) and in the exhibition, Art of Australia 1788-1941, shown at MOMA (New York) in 1941.

== The Pink Hotel ==
Bryans went to live in Darebin Bridge House, a converted coach-house at Darebin, in the late 1930s, joining Ada May Plante. Bryans subsequently purchased it using her inheritance, painted and decorated it distinctively and named it "The Pink Hotel". It became an artists' colony for Bryans, Plante, Frater, Ambrose Hallen and Ian Fairweather and other artists.

From 1945 she opened the doors to the Meanjin group: Vance and Nettie Palmer, Rosa and Dolia Ribush, Jean Campbell, Laurie Thomas and Alan McCulloch. There they joined the moderates in the Contemporary Art Society (Norman Macgeorge, Clive Stephen, Isobel Tweddle and Rupert Bunny, Sybil Craig, Guelda Pyke, Elma Roach, Ola Cohn and Madge Freeman and George Bell). The liberal, conservative modernists in Melbourne were thus given an identity and a base, attracting group of writers associated with the journal Meanjin, in turn sparking an interest in journalism in Lina's son Edward.

== Mid-career ==
In 1948 Bryans had her first solo exhibition. It included Nude (1945, NGV) and Portrait of Nina Christesen (1947), both painted at Darebin, which she sold later that year and moved to Harkaway, near Berwick. She took a few lessons from George Bell in 1948 and from Mary Cockburn Mercer in 1951. In 1953 she went to America, then to France, where she studied for a few months at La Grande Chaumière and visited Mercer in the south of France. Back at Melbourne, she once more became prominent in the city's artistic and cultural milieu.

== Recognition ==
Landscape painting was always important to Bryans and throughout the 1960s and 1970s, it became more dramatic and abstract. In 1965 she visited Central Australia and painted modernist paintings of the Australian bush in heightened colour. She was awarded the 1966 Crouch Prize for Embedded Rock (1964, BFAG). Her major work Landscape Quartet from her second solo exhibition, held at Georges Gallery in 1966, was purchased by the National Gallery of Victoria, which awarded her a retrospective in 1982, held at Banyule Gallery in 1982, which subsequently toured regional galleries in Victoria.

Nevertheless, as Forwood notes (2001), her portraits 'best reveal her contribution to Australian art’, moreover, 'her seventy-three portraits of friends engaged in the world of art and letters form a pictorial biography of Bryans herself’. Her well-known, jaunty portrait of Australian writer Jean May Campbell, The Babe is Wise, (named after Campbell's novel of the year before) was painted in 1940. It is held in the National Gallery of Victoria collection.

Bryans was a member of the Independent Group. In 1991 she rejoined the Melbourne Society of Women Painters and Sculptors, in which she had first enlisted in 1940 and quit in 1966. In the 1960s, as a guest exhibitor, she was one of the most important and professional artists associated with the Society, and critics consistently placed her works at the forefront of MSWPS group shows. In 1966 one faction of the MSWPS was anxious to see the high-standing artist Lina Bryans elected president for her dynamic outlook.

In the 1994 Queen's Birthday Honours Bryans was awarded the Medal of the Order of Australia (OAM) for "service to the visual arts as a landscape painter".

== Exhibition history ==
=== Solo exhibitions ===
- 1948, 1966 Georges Gallery, Melbourne.

=== Major curated exhibitions ===
- 1937, Joseph Brown Gallery, Melbourne
- 1941 Art of Australia Museum of Modern Art New York
- 1988 Creating Australia, Art Gallery of South Australia
- 1988 The Face of Australia (National touring exhibition associated with the Australian Bicentennial
- 1982 Retrospective National Gallery of Victoria
- 1992 Survey exhibition at the National Gallery of Victoria
- 1995 Survey exhibition at University of Melbourne.

== Collections ==
- Ballarat Fine Art Gallery, Ballarat, VIC
- Art Gallery of Western Australia, Perth, WA http://www.artgallery.wa.gov.au/
- Yale University, New Haven, Connecticut, USA
- Turnbull Library, State Library of New Zealand, Wellington, NZ
- Melbourne University, Melbourne, VIC
- La Trobe Collection, State Library of Victoria, Melbourne, VIC
- Art Gallery of South Australia, Adelaide, SA http://www.artgallery.sa.gov.au/
- Tasmanian Museum and Art Gallery, Hobart, TAS
- McClelland Art Gallery, Langwarrin, VIC
- Benalla Art Gallery, Benalla, VIC
- Bendigo Art Gallery, Bendigo, VIC
- National Gallery of Victoria, Melbourne, VIC
- National Library of Australia, Canberra, ACT
- National Portrait Gallery, Canberra, ACT
- National Gallery of Australia, Canberra, ACT http://cs.nga.gov.au/Default.cfm
- Wollongong Regional Art Gallery, Wollongong, NSW
- Manly Art Gallery and Museum, Manly, NSW
- Art Gallery of New South Wales, Sydney, NSW, Australia http://www.artgallery.nsw.gov.au/
- University of Adelaide, SA
- Geelong Art Gallery, Geelong, VIC
- Ian Potter Museum of Art, the University of Melbourne, VIC http://www.art-museum.unimelb.edu.au/art_collection.aspx
