= Joan Lindsay =

Australian novelist, playwright and essayist

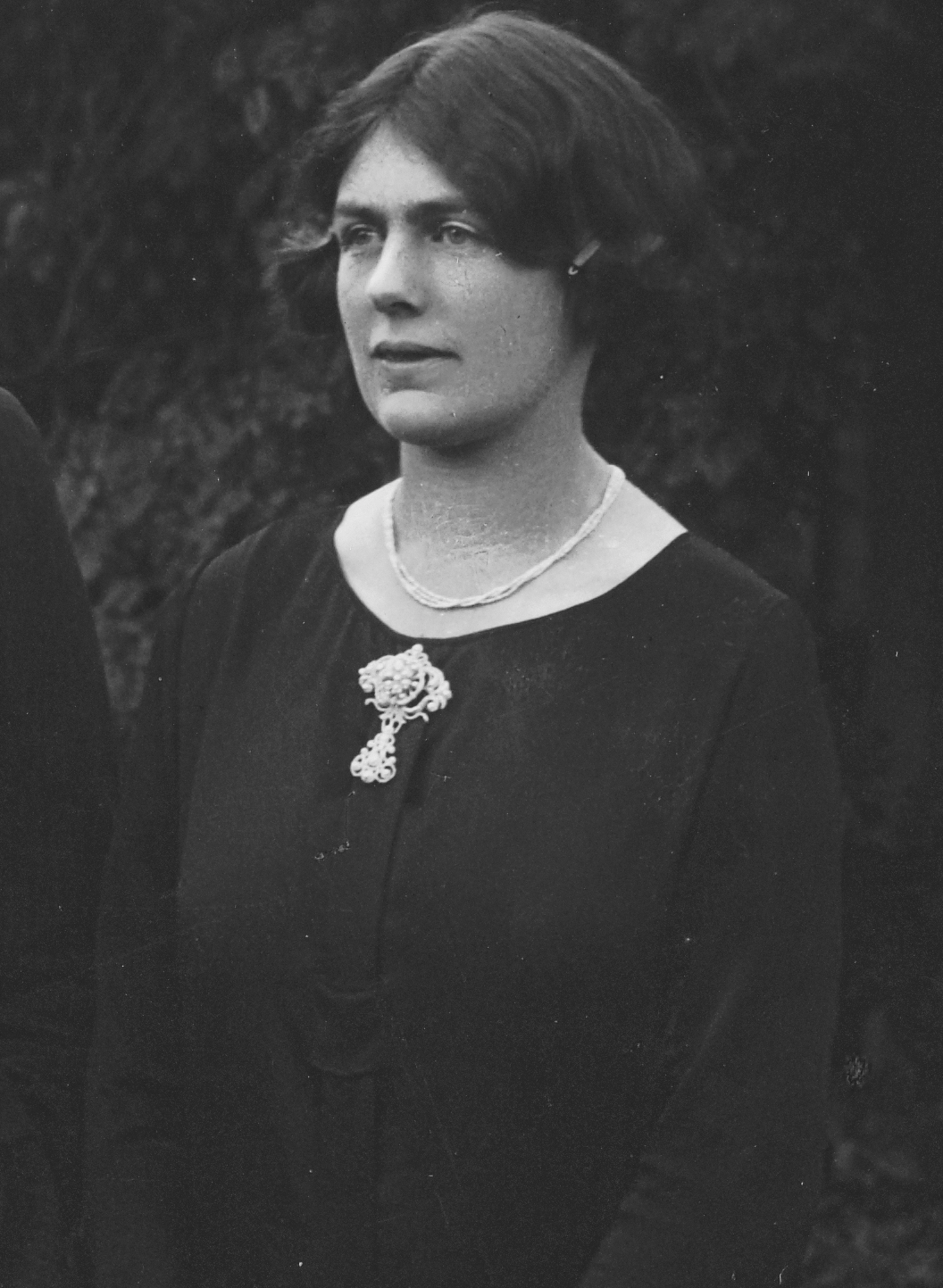
- Lindsay, c. 1925
- Born: Joan à Beckett Weigall; 16 November 1896; St Kilda East, Colony of Victoria
- Died: 23 December 1984 (aged 88); Frankston, Victoria, Australia
- Education: National Gallery of Victoria Art School
- Occupations: Novelist; visual artist; essayist; playwright
- Spouse: Daryl Lindsay (m. 1922; died 1976)
- Writing career
- Pen name: Serena Livingstone-Stanley
- Genres: Satire, autobiography, Gothic

Joan à Beckett Weigall, Lady Lindsay (16 November 1896 – 23 December 1984) was an Australian novelist, playwright, essayist, and visual artist. Trained in her youth as a painter, she published her first literary work in 1936 at age forty under a pseudonym, a satirical novel titled Through Darkest Pondelayo. Her second novel, Time Without Clocks, was published nearly thirty years later, and was a semi-autobiographical account of the early years of her marriage to artist Sir Daryl Lindsay.

In 1967, Lindsay published her most celebrated work, Picnic at Hanging Rock, a historical Gothic novel detailing the vanishing of three schoolgirls and their teacher at the site of a monolith during one summer. The novel sparked critical and public interest for its ambivalent presentation as a true story as well as its vague conclusion, and is widely considered to be one of the most important Australian novels. It was adapted into a 1975 film of the same name.

She was also the author of several unpublished plays, and contributed essays, short stories, and poetry to numerous journals and publications throughout her career. After the death of Lindsay's husband in 1976, she spent her time involved in the local art community in Melbourne, and was involved in several exhibitions. Her last published work, Syd Sixpence (1982), was her first and only work of children's literature. Lindsay died of stomach cancer in 1984, after which her home was donated to the Australian National Trust; the Lindsay estate now operates as a museum with her and her husband Daryl's artwork and personal effects.

== Life and career ==
=== Early life ===
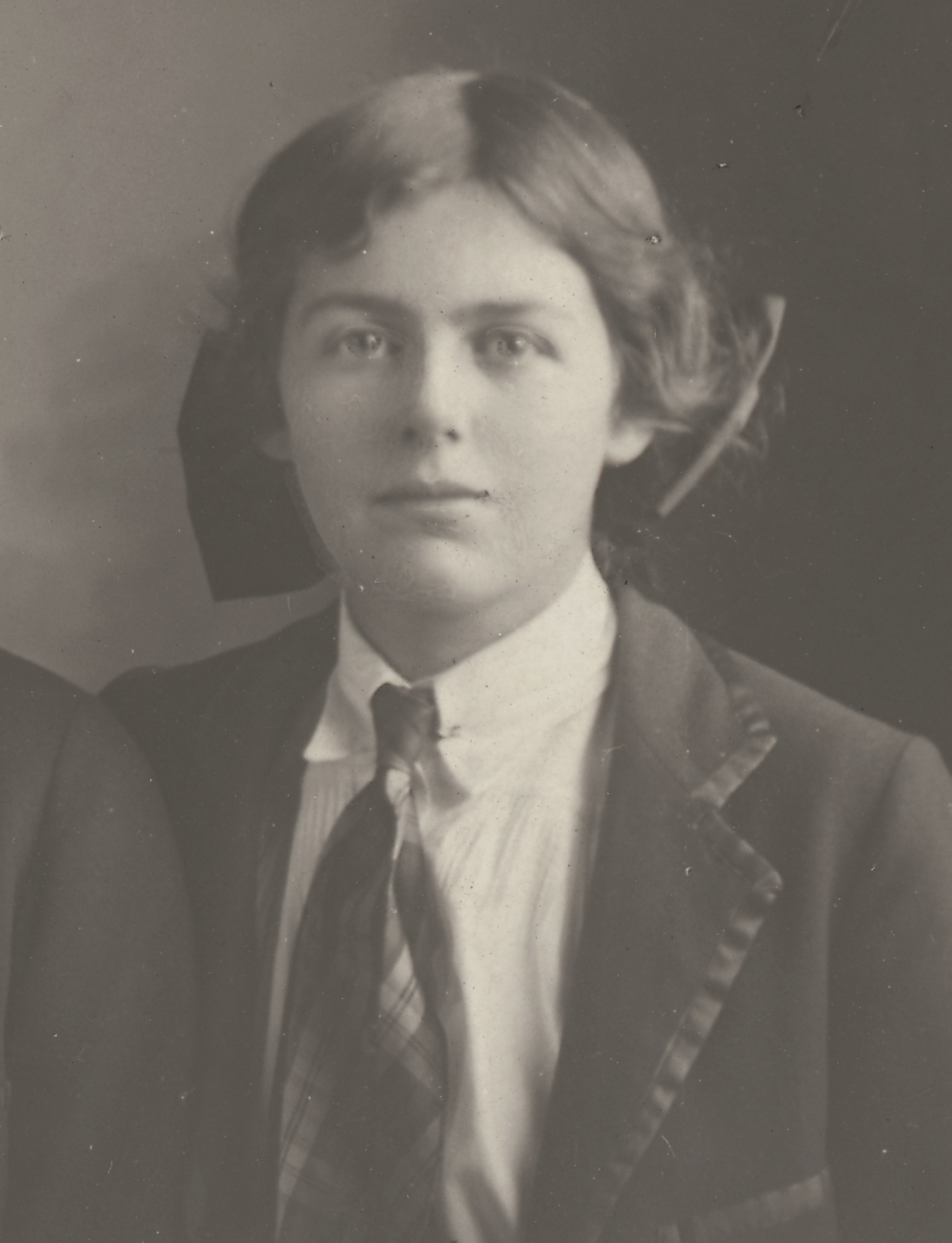
Lindsay in a 1914 school photograph

Joan à Beckett Weigall was born in St Kilda East, Victoria, Australia, a suburb of Melbourne, the third daughter of Theyre à Beckett Weigall, a prominent judge. His cousin, William Arthur Callendar à Beckett, was father to Emma Minnie Boyd and thus Lindsay was related to the Boyd family including writer Martin Boyd. Her mother, Ann Sophie Weigall (née Hamilton), was the daughter of the Scottish born Sir Robert Hamilton, a Governor of Tasmania; she was a musician born and raised in Dublin. Lindsay had two sisters, Mim and Nancy, and a brother, Theyre Jr. Lindsay spent her early years in a mansion called "St Margaret's", at 151 Alma Road, East St Kilda. She described her childhood as "outwardly happy and uneventful."

In 1909 at the age of thirteen, Lindsay was sent to a local boarding school, then called Carhue, to complete her education. During Lindsay's time there the school went through a change in ownership and was renamed the Clyde Girls' Grammar School; she was a model student. The school was relocated to near Mount Macedon, five years after Joan's final year. After graduating from Clyde, Lindsay considered becoming an architect, but decided to study art instead, enrolling at the National Gallery of Victoria Art School in Melbourne in 1916. There, while studying painting, she was educated by Bernard Hall and Frederick McCubbin.

In 1920 she began sharing a Melbourne studio with Maie Ryan (later Lady Casey). Joan exhibited her watercolours and oils at two Melbourne exhibitions in 1920, one of which was titled "The Neo-Pantechnicists" and exhibited with the Victorian Artists Society. She and Casey also collaborated on an unfinished book together, titled Portrait of Anna.

=== Marriage to Daryl Lindsay; early works ===
While studying at the National Gallery of Victoria Art School, she met fellow art student Daryl Lindsay. The two married in Marylebone, London, England on St. Valentine's Day 1922. The day was always a special occasion for her, and she set her most famous work, Picnic at Hanging Rock, on St. Valentine's Day.

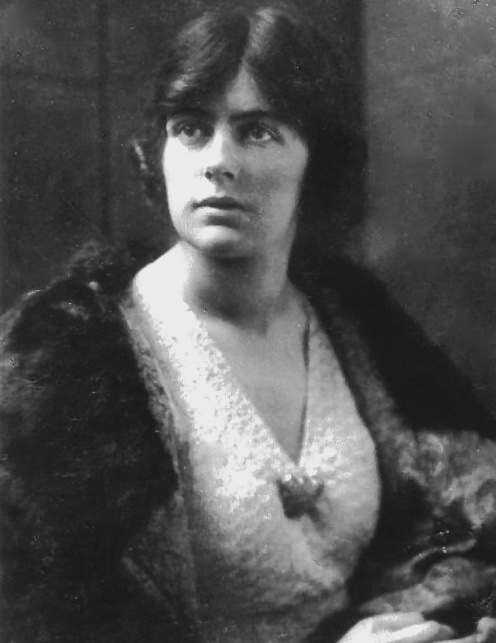
Lindsay, c. 1920

When the couple returned to live in Australia, they renovated a farmhouse in Baxter — Mulberry Hill — and lived there until the Great Depression forced them to take up more humble lodgings in Bacchus Marsh, renting out their home until the economic situation improved. During this time, Lindsay shifted her focus from painting to writing, and wrote two plays, both of which explored the uncanny and the macabre — Cataract, and Wolf!, the latter of which was a collaboration with Margot Goyder and Ann Joske ("Margot Neville"), Australia's best-known detective story writers at the time. Though neither of the plays was published, Wolf! was performed on stage in Swanage, England in May 1930.

After returning from travel in England and Europe, Lindsay published her first novel, Through Darkest Pondelayo: An account of the adventures of two English ladies on a cannibal island, in 1936, under the pseudonym Serena Livingstone-Stanley. Published by Chatto & Windus in the United Kingdom, the novel is structured as a parody of popular travel books of the time but filled with intentional grammatical errors, also functioning as a satire on English tourists abroad. According to Lindsay's cousin Martin Boyd, the novel was "one of the best collections of malapropisms in the English language." Lindsay helped Boyd write the outline for his novel, Nuns in Jeopardy (1940).

Lindsay also contributed articles, reviews and stories to various magazines and newspapers on art, literature and prominent people. In 1928, she interviewed actress Margaret Bannerman for Victoria's The Weekly Courier, and, in 1941, co-authored the History of the Australian Red Cross with husband Daryl. In 1942, Lindsay published an essay of literary criticism on novelist George Moore in The Age, titled "A Modern of the Nineties. George Moore: literary craftsman."

During this period, Daryl Lindsay abandoned painting to become Director of the National Gallery of Victoria, a position he held between 1942 and 1955. The position necessitated their relocation to Melbourne until his retirement. They retained their country home during their Victoria sojourn. When Daryl was knighted in 1956, Joan became known as Lady Lindsay.

Her semi-autobiographical novel Time Without Clocks describes her wedding and idyllic early married life. The work takes its title from a strange ability which Joan described herself as having, of stopping clocks and machinery when she came close. The title also plays on the idea that this period in her life was unstructured and free. This was followed with Facts Soft and Hard, a humorous, semi-autobiographical account of the Lindsays' travels in the United States while Daryl was on a Fulbright Award, which took the couple to New York City on a study tour of American art collections held by the Carnegie Corporation.

=== Picnic at Hanging Rock ===
Picnic at Hanging Rock, published in 1967, is Lindsay's best known work. Lindsay wrote the novel over a four-week period at her home Mulberry Hill in Baxter, on Victoria's Mornington Peninsula, and constructed it around the real-life Hanging Rock, a monolith that had fascinated her since her childhood. She compared the story to the work of Henry James, citing the "book about the children in a haunted house with a governess" (The Turn of the Screw).

The novel is historical fiction, though Lindsay dropped hints that it was based on an actual event, and is framed as such in the novel's introduction. An ending that explained the girls' fates, in draft form, was excised by her publisher prior to publication. The final chapter was published only in 1987 as a standalone book titled The Secret of Hanging Rock, and also included critical commentary and interpretive theories on the novel. Lindsay based Appleyard College, the setting for the novel, on the school that she had attended, Clyde Girls Grammar School (Clyde School), at East St Kilda, Melbourne—which in 1919 was transferred to Woodend, Victoria, in the immediate vicinity of Hanging Rock.

In a 1974 interview, Lindsay addressed readers' and critics' questioning about the novel's ambiguous conclusion, saying:

Well, it was written as a mystery and it remains a mystery. If you can draw your own conclusions, that's fine, but I don't think that it matters. I wrote that book as a sort of atmosphere of a place, and it was like dropping a stone into the water. I felt that story, if you call it a story—that the thing that happened on St. Valentine's Day went on spreading, out and out and out, in circles.

The novel's ambiguous conclusion led to significant interest from both public and critical readers, and the novel has drawn comparisons from literary critics to the work of E.M. Forster and Nathaniel Hawthorne. It was made into a 1975 feature film by producers Patricia Lovell, Hal and Jim McElroy, and director Peter Weir, which was hailed as initiating the revival of Australian cinema. A re-printing of the novel in 1975 by Penguin Books in Australia sold over 350,000 copies, making it Penguin Australia's best-selling novel to date (second, overall, only to Albert Facey's autobiography, A Fortunate Life).

=== Later life and death ===
In 1969, Lindsay suffered severe injuries in a car accident and she required months of convalescence. Daryl Lindsay died on Christmas Day 1976. Lady Lindsay's later years were spent invested in visual arts, with frequent visits to the Lyceum Club in Melbourne, and to the McClelland Gallery in Langwarrin, where she was involved in the local art community. She painted several works in her later years, and she was lauded by the art critic, Alan McCulloch.

In 1972, she reunited with Lady Maie Casey and held an art exhibition at the McLelland in Langwarrin. Artist Rick Amor and his children, who had lived in a cottage of Lindsay's property, led her to resurrect an unpublished children's book she had written, titled Syd Sixpence, which she published in 1982. Amor supplied illustrations for the book, which tells the story of Syd, an anthropomorphic sixpence coin's adventures on the ocean floor. Lindsay also worked on another novel, entitled Love at the Billabong, which was left unfinished.

Lindsay died of stomach cancer at Peninsula Private Hospital in Frankston, Melbourne on 23 December 1984, aged 88. She was cremated, and her ashes are interred at Creswick Cemetery in Creswick, Shire of Hepburn in Victoria, Australia. As the Lindsays had no children, their Mulberry Hill home was bequeathed to the National Trust of Australia (Victoria). The Mulberry Hill estate is open to the public for self-guided tours, and contains both Joan and Daryl Lindsay's original artwork and personal possessions.

Lindsay's visual artwork has been exhibited posthumously as part of the National Women's Art Exhibition in Australia.

In 2025, foremost Australian biographer, Brenda Niall published Lindsay's biography, Joan Lindsay. The hidden life of the woman who wrote Picnic at Hanging Rock.

== Bibliography ==
Bibliography adapted from the State Library Victoria archive.

=== Books ===
- Through Darkest Pondelayo (Chatto & Windus, 1936)
- Time Without Clocks (F. W. Cheshire, 1962)
- Facts Soft and Hard (F. W. Cheshire, 1964)
- Picnic at Hanging Rock (F. W. Cheshire, 1967)
- The Secret of Hanging Rock (F. W. Cheshire, 1987) (excised final chapter to Picnic at Hanging Rock, published posthumously in 1987)
- Syd Sixpence (Kestrel Books, 1982)

=== Short stories ===
- "Holiday", The Home, 5, 2, 1923.
- "Yellow Roses", The Home, 5, 5, 1924.
- "The Awakening", Table Talk Annual, Christmas 1924.
- "Good with Cats", Bulletin, 101, 5221, 22 July 1980.

=== Journal contributions ===
- "The Giant White Gum Tree" Little Folks 76, 1912
- "Their Prologue" (with Dorothy Watson) The Cluthan, 1 May 1914
- "Library Notes" (with E. Beggs) The Cluthan, 1 May 1914
- "On Leaving School" The Cluthan, 2 December 1914
- "Clyde Dramatic Club" The Cluthan, 4 December 1915
- "Melba's Wonderful Farewell" Herald, 14 October 1924
- "Pavlova Rehearses" The Home, 1 May 1926
- "A Landscape in Words" Art in Australia, 3rd series, 17 September 1926
- "Art in Melbourne" Triad 13, 3 March 1927
- "Mr Harrison's Pictures" The Argus, 22 March 1927
- "Mr H. B. Harrison's Pictures" Australasian, 26 March 1927
- "Australian Art: 1 – Melbourne; II – Mr Rupert Bunny" Triad 13, 4 April 1927 (unsigned)
- "Australian Art" New Triad, 1 August 1927 (unsigned)
- "Westbury: a village of dreams come true, by a Victorian" Mercury (Hobart), 13 March 1928
- "Tasmania: wonderful natural heritage: a revelation of beauty, by a Mainland Visitor" Mercury, 26 March 1928
- "Tasmania through an Artist's Eyes: Mrs Daryl Lindsay visits art exhibition" Weekly Courier (Launceston), April 1928
- "Best Dressed Actress on English Stage: Margaret Bannerman interviewed for the Courier" Weekly Courier, 16 May 1928
- "Australia's Great Artist Knight: an interview with Sir John Longstaff' Weekly Courier, 23 May 1928
- "A Victorian Flower Farm and Its Fair Farmer" Weekly Courier, 6 June 1928
- "An Interview with Sir Archibald Strong" Weekly Courier, 20 June 1928
- "An Interview with Mrs Stanley Bruce" Weekly Courier, 4 July 1928
- "A Talk about Antique Furniture: new lamps for old, especially if they are of Georgian design" Weekly Courier 25 July 1928
- "An Interview with 'Margot Neville'" Weekly Courier, 15 August 1928
- "Coombe Cottage" Table Talk, 15 November 1928
- "Some Sydney Impressions" The Home, November 1929 (under pseudonym "Beckett Lindsay")
- "The Passing of Saint Valentine" The Home, 1 February 1930 (unsigned)
- "On Spruiking in Melbourne" The Home, 1 August 1930 (under pseudonym "B.L.")
- "Re-enter Mushrooms" The Home, 1 August 1930 (under pseudonym "Beckett Lindsay")
- "To G.W.L." Art in Australia, 3rd series, 33, August–September 1930 (under pseudonym "Beckett Lindsay")
- "Some Nasty People" The Home, 1 September 1930 (under pseudonym "B. Lindsay")
- "An Old Time Horse Bus" The Home, 1 October 1930 (under pseudonym "B. Lindsay")
- "Synthetic Shopping" The Home, 1 April 1931 (under pseudonym "Beckett Lindsay")
- "'Where the Rainbow Ends' – (in Bourke Street). Famous Book Arcade Victim of the Wrecker" Herald, 1932, (under pseudonym "Beckett Lindsay")
- "English Afternoon Tea" The Home, 1 September 1938
- "Intimacies in Print: Russell Grimwade" Australia: National Journal, 2, Spring 1939
- "General Blamey" Australia: National Journal, 3, Summer 1939
- "A Modern of the Nineties. George Moore: literary craftsman," The Age, 1942
- "A Possum Party" Sun, 22 September 1950
- "A Chance to Help" Herald, 1951
- "Still Life by Constance Stokes" J.L. Quarterly Bulletin of the National Gallery of Victoria v, 3, 1951
- "Station Blacks, Cape York by Russell Drysdale; Three Wise Men by Michael Kmit" Quarterly Bulletin of the National Gallery of Victoria viii, 2, 1954
- "Frederick McCubbin: 1855–1917". Quarterly Bulletin of the National Gallery of Victoria ix, 2, 1955
- "Letter from the President" Quarterly Bulletin of the Arts & Crafts Society of Victoria Limited no. 1, February 1962
- "Annual Report – Lady Lindsay" Quarterly Bulletin of the Arts & Crafts Society of Victoria Limited no.2, May 1962
- "Afternoon at the Moore's" Quarterly Bulletin of the Arts & Crafts Society of Victoria Limited no.9, February 1964
- "Victorian Victorians" Australian Book Review, March 1965
- "A L'Ombre" Australian Book Review, July 1965
- "An Evening with Angela" Australian Book Review, July 1965
- "Feminine Bloomers" Australian Book Review October 1965
- "Art Nouveau & Uncle Ted" Quarterly Bulletin of the Arts & Crafts Society of Victoria Limited, November 1966

=== Unpublished works ===
Plays

- Wolf! (1930)
- Spring Tangle (c. 1935)
- Cataract (1940)
- My Kingdom for a Chocolate Blancmange! A tragedy in fifty thousand acts. With apologies to William Shakespeare, Thornton Wilder and some very fine artists (1948)
- Floreat Anglesea (1950)
- This Modern Art (1951)

Novels and memoirs

- Love at the Billabong (1978); novel, unfinished
- Alma Road (1979); autobiography, unfinished
- Love and Information (1982); novella

== See also ==
- Tasmanian Gothic
- Hanging Rock, Victoria
- Mulberry Hill

== Sources ==
- Adelaide, Debra (1988). Australian women writers: a bibliographic guide. Pandora. ISBN 978-0-863-58148-9.
- Arnold, John; Hay, John (2008). The Bibliography of Australian Literature. Vol. 3. University of Queensland Press. ISBN 978-0-702-23598-6.
- Benson, Eugene, ed. (2005). Encyclopedia of Post-Colonial Literatures in English. Routledge. ISBN 978-0-415-27885-0.
- Gleeson-White, Jane (2011). Australian Classics: 50 Great Writers and Their Celebrated Work. Allen & Unwin. ISBN 978-1-742-37268-6.
- O'Neill, Terrence (May 2009). "Joan Lindsay: A Time for Everything". The La Trobe Journal (83). State Library of Victoria.
- Theobald, Marjorie R. (1998). Knowing Women: Origins of Women's Education in Nineteenth-Century Australia. Cambridge University Press. ISBN 978-0-521-42232-1.
