= Frank Cheshire =

Australian bookseller and publisher

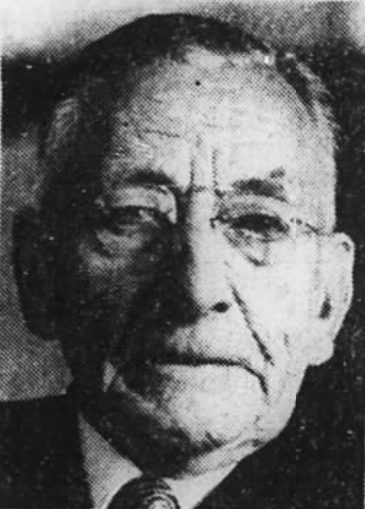
- Frank Cheshire
- Born: 6 June 1896; East Melbourne, Victoria, Australia
- Died: 19 November 1987 (aged 91); Balwyn, Victoria, Australia
- Occupations: Bookseller, publisher
- Known for: Founder of F. W. Cheshire Pty. Ltd.

Frank Cheshire (1896–1987) was an Australian bookseller and publisher. His bookshop in Little Collins Street, Melbourne was described as a "gathering place for all interested in books and literature" in the mid-twentieth century. His publishing firm, F. W. Cheshire Pty. Ltd. published school textbooks and dominated that market in the state of Victoria for many years. It "began a new era in publishing" when it published Australian text books for Australian schools instead of importing them from Britain. The firm also published a number of general trade bestsellers such as Alan Marshall's I Can Jump Puddles, Robin Boyd's The Australian Ugliness and Joan Lindsay's Picnic at Hanging Rock and "gave many Australian writers their first start".

== Early life and education ==
Frank Cheshire was born Frank Walter Cheshire on 6 June 1896 in East Melbourne, Victoria. His parents were Thomas James Cheshire, a journalist, and his wife Eliza, formerly Napper, née Holland. Cheshire's education was spread between Blackburn State School, Balwyn State School, and Glenferrie State School.

His first job was with the booksellers George Robertson & Co. in Elizabeth Street, Melbourne. In the same period he became active in the local Baptist church in the eastern Melbourne suburb of Canterbury where the family was now living. His Christian principles led him becoming a pacifist and declining to volunteer for service in the First World War.

In the years 1916–18 he was involved with companies supplying schools with "stationery and materials". In 1918, following the death of his brother with the Australian military forces in France and at the prompting of friends, he volunteered for service with the First Australian Imperial Force but was rejected on medical grounds.

During the 1920s Cheshire worked for Hutchinsons Booksellers Pty. Ltd., based in Little Collins Street, Melbourne, distributing educational supplies to "schools, newsagencies and bookshops".

== F. W. Cheshire Pty. Ltd. ==
In 1925 Frank Cheshire took over Hutchinsons, acquiring all its stock and equipment and with borrowed capital he launched F. W. Cheshire Pty Ltd, "educational booksellers and stationers". The firm's first office with in Little Collins Street in Melbourne's central business district. Cheshire published local editions of Shakespeare for schools to avoid importing thousands of copies from the United Kingdom every year. He also started publishing arithmetic and mathematics texts for schools, beginning with Robert Wilson's Intermediate Certificate Arithmetic (1933). The latter was a big success, being reprinted 22 times by 1958.

In 1932 Cheshire opened his first retail bookshop and in 1938 the business moved to larger premises at 338 Little Collins Street, which over the years would become a "cultural landmark". The firm's first publication was Wilfred Burchett's Pacific Treasure Island: New Caledonia (1941). In 1944 Cheshire published Alan Marshall's These Are My People, "stories [Marshall] collected while travelling with his wife Olive in a horse-drawn caravan through Victoria" and which sold 9,000 copies in the first month. Cheshire would later publish several more of Marshall's books including "best-known, autobiographical work" I Can Jump Puddles (1955).

== Andrew Fabinyi ==
In 1939 a new immigrant Andrew Fabinyi joined F.W. Cheshire Pty. Ltd. and over the years he helped transform the firm into a major force in the Australian book publishing, adding general books to its original educational publishing. In 1957 he was appointed general manager of F. W. Cheshire Publishing Pty Ltd. (a separate company set up by Frank to handle his growing publishing activities). Fabinyi attracted new authors and nurtured their works, some of which became bestsellers for the firm, including Robin Boyd's The Australian Ugliness (1960), Sir Frederic Eggleston's Reflections of an Australian Liberal (1952–53) and Joan Lindsay's Picnic at Hanging Rock (1967).

In his publishing programme he placed an emphasis on "the arts, history, biography... and the social sciences", with authors ranging from Brian Fitzpatrick, Lord Casey and Clive Turnbull to Cyril Pearl and Peter Coleman. He also published fiction and poetry for the F. W. Cheshire catalogue, with works by novelists such as Kenneth Cook, Vance Palmer, Neilma Sidney and Judah Waten and poets such as Bruce Dawe, Geoffrey Dutton, Vincent Buckley and Lionel Lindsay.

Meanwhile the bookselling enterprise continued to expand with new locations in Little Bourke Street and La Trobe Street, Melbourne and a warehouse in the suburb of Abbotsford. Its reliable service and rising reputation led to it "monopolising the school market" in Victoria.

== Sale of the companies ==
In 1964 Cheshire sold both his firms to Wilke and Co. Ltd., a printer and publisher, and Odhams Press (Aust.) Pty. Ltd., for a price of "nearly $2 million", while staying on as general manager until 1967. Odhams was a subsidiary of the International Publishing Corporation (the Daily Mirror group) of England. The firm's name still appeared for three decades from 1969 in the Australian publishing firm of Longman Cheshire.

== Views on censorship ==
In 1960, in the period when he was president of the Booksellers Association of Victoria, Cheshire condemned Victoria Police for raiding booksellers and seizing copies of Charles Orson Gorham's novel Carlotta McBride. He said: "It is amazing that although this novel was cleared by Customs... for general distribution, it should now be seized. However, in 1975 at an event marking 50 years of publishing by the Cheshires, he remarked that he was "entirely in favor of censorship" and that "there are things that happen in private that should be left in private".

== Public service and honours ==
Frank Cheshire was the president of the Victorian Booksellers Association in the years 1953-63 and president of the Australian Booksellers Association in the years 1959-60.

For many years he worked on the management committee and then as the president of the non-denominational Burwood Children's Homes (formerly known as the Burwood Boys' Home) in the Melbourne suburb of Burwood which looked after neglected children. That home is now known as BestChance, is "one of Victoria's most respected children's services" and operates the Cheshire School, which has been named in Frank's memory. In 2015 it was announced that "[Jean] and her husband Frank's contribution to the Cheshire School" would be "honoured in an appropriate memorial".

In 1983 Frank and his wife Jean were appointed knight and dame of the Sovereign Order of St John Jerusalem Knights Hospitaller.

== Personal life ==
Frank Cheshire was described in his obituary in The Age as "a gentle man who made up his mind quickly and always kept his word". A "non-smoker, a teetotaller and a devoted father", he was deeply religious and by nature a conservative.

On 20 November 1920 he married Vera Mabel Worth whom he had met through his church activities. Vera died in 1955. Cheshire married Shirley Jean Moyes, née Mackay, in 1956.

He died on 19 November 1987 at Balwyn, Victoria. He was survived by Jean and their three sons, and by two sons of his first marriage.
