= 2026 VAFA season =

125th season of the Victorian Amateur Football Association

- Date: 17 April – 25 September 2026

The 2026 VAFA season was the 125th season of the Victorian Amateur Football Association (VAFA), the largest senior Australian rules football competition in Victoria. The season began on 17 April and concluded with the Premier Men's grand final on 25 September.

In the men's competition, 55 teams participated across six divisions under a promotion and relegation system. In the women's competition, 59 teams participated across seven divisions, with a mid-season regrading taking place after round 4.

== Association membership ==
=== Box Hill North ===
Box Hill North, which was set to compete in Division 3 of the men's competition, went into recess five days before the start of the 2026 season. In a statement, the club said it had "clearly and consistently communicated" to the VAFA that it could not field a senior team and had requested a transfer to the Thirds competition.

The club denied that its withdrawal was related to its post-season celebrations, when one player wore full-body blackface and others dressed up in costumes related to the St Kilda schoolgirl scandal. All four players involved were suspended for up to three matches, while the club's leadership group was stood down until completing "appropriate education sessions".

=== St John's ===
After 34 years in the VAFA, St John's moved to the Southern Football Netball League (SFNL) following the conclusion of the 2025 season. The club said the move was motivated by its location and proximity to other SFNL teams. This meant only one team was relegated from Division 2 Men's, with Hawthorn going down and Aquinas staying up.

This was the first time a VAFA team had transferred to the SFNL since St Francis Xavier and South Mornington both moved at the end of the 2019 season.

=== Other withdrawals ===
St Bedes/Mentone Tigers (SBMT) withdrew its women's team because of insufficient player numbers. The side had finished fifth in Premier B Women's in 2025, where SBMT player Maddi Wilson had won the division's best and fairest award.

Three Division 3 Men's clubs – Chadstone, Eley Park and Swinburne University – chose to move into the Thirds competition.

== Premier Men's ==
2026 Premier Men's season
- Date: 17 April – 25 September 2026
- Teams: 10
- Premiers: University Blues; 8th premiership

=== Ladder ===
Pos	Team	Pld	W	L	D	PF	PA	PP	Pts	Qualification or relegation
1	University Blues	18	15	3	0	1679	1129	148.7	60	Finals series
2	Old Xaverians	18	15	3	0	1772	1239	143.0	60	Finals series
3	St Kevin's	18	12	6	0	1697	1364	124.4	48	Finals series
4	Old Brighton	18	12	6	0	1599	1337	119.6	48	Finals series
5	University Blacks	18	8	10	0	1373	1401	98.0	32	
6	Old Scotch	18	7	11	0	1470	1578	93.2	28	
7	Old Trinity	18	6	11	1	1235	1598	77.3	26	
8	Caulfield Grammarians	18	5	12	1	1394	1727	80.7	22	
9	Old Haileybury	18	5	13	0	1282	1758	72.9	20	Relegated
10	St Bernard's	18	4	14	0	1296	1666	77.8	16	Relegated

Source: VAFA.com.au
Rules for classification: 1) points; 2) percentage; 3) number of points for

=== Finals series ===
==== Qualifying and elimination finals ====
	Qualifying final
Saturday, 12 September (2:00pm)	University Blues; 15.12 (102)	def.	Old Xaverians 7.9 (51)	Elsternwick Park	Report

	Elimination final
Saturday, 12 September (2:30pm)	St Kevin's 12.12 (84)	def.	Old Brighton 12.11 (83)	Trevor Barker Beach Oval	Report

==== Preliminary final ====
	Preliminary final
Saturday, 19 September (2:40pm)	Old Xaverians 13.12 (90)	def.	St Kevin's 12.11 (83)	Elsternwick Park	Report

==== Grand Final ====
	Premier Men's Grand Final
Friday, 25 September (2:30pm)	University Blues; 10.26 (86)	def.	Old Xaverians 13.4 (82)	Elsternwick Park	Report

== Premier Women's ==
2026 Premier Women's season
- Date: 17 April – 20 September 2026
- Teams: 9
- Premiers: Old Scotch; 5th premiership

=== Ladder ===
Pos	Team	P	W	L	D	Pts	F	A	%	MR	Qualification or relegation
1	Old Scotch	15	15	0	0	60	1224	276	443.48	93.75	Finals series
2	Caulfield Grammarians	16	14	2	0	56	934	247	378.14	87.50	Finals series
3	Kew	16	8	8	0	32	479	571	83.89	50.00	Finals series
4	Old Brighton	16	8	8	0	32	503	758	66.36	50.00	Finals series
5	Fitzroy	17	8	9	0	32	564	635	88.82	47.06	
6	West Brunswick	16	7	9	0	28	367	505	72.67	43.75	
7	Old Geelong	17	7	10	0	28	519	710	73.10	41.18	
8	St Kevin's	16	5	11	0	20	453	690	65.65	31.25	
9	Westbourne	16	3	13	0	12	310	689	44.99	18.75	Relegated

Source: VAFA.com.au
Rules for classification: 1) match ratio; (Note: Match ratio (MR) refers to the number of wins by each team against the number of matches played by each team. It is used when teams have played an unequal number of matches and typically occurs due to in-season regradings.) 2) points; 3) percentage; 4) number of points for

=== Finals series ===
==== Qualifying and elimination finals ====
	Qualifying final
Sunday, 6 September (2:00pm)	Old Scotch 6.1 (37)	def. by	Caulfield Grammarians 6.9 (45)	Carey Sports Complex	Report

	Elimination final
Sunday, 6 September (2:00pm)	Kew 4.6 (30)	def.	Old Brighton 4.5 (29)	DSV Stadium	Report

==== Preliminary final ====
	Preliminary final
Saturday, 12 September (6:00pm)	Old Scotch 15.13 (103)	def.	Kew 2.3 (15)	Kennedy Community Centre	Report

==== Grand Final ====
	Premier Women's Grand Final
Sunday, 20 September (2:30pm)	Caulfield Grammarians 1.3 (9)	def. by	Old Scotch 5.7 (37)	Elsternwick Park	Report

== Premier B Men's ==
2026 Premier B Men's season
- Date: 17 April – 20 September 2026
- Teams: 10
- Premiers: Collegians; 22nd premiership

=== Ladder ===
Pos	Team	Pld	W	L	D	PF	PA	PP	Pts	Qualification or relegation
1	Collegians	18	18	0	0	2128	872	244.0	72	Finals series
2	De La Salle	18	11	7	0	1593	1394	114.3	44	Finals series
3	Old Melburnians	18	10	8	0	1294	1422	91.0	40	Finals series
4	Beaumaris	18	8	8	2	1427	1393	102.4	36	Finals series
5	Old Camberwell	18	9	9	0	1182	1390	85.0	36	
6	Old Carey	18	8	10	0	1581	1509	104.8	32	
7	AJAX	18	8	10	0	1311	1502	87.3	32	
8	Old Geelong	18	6	10	2	1387	1602	86.6	28	
9	Williamstown CYMS	18	6	12	0	1227	1691	72.6	24	Relegated
10	Old Ivanhoe	18	3	13	2	1300	1655	78.5	16	Relegated

Source: VAFA.com.au
Rules for classification: 1) points; 2) percentage; 3) number of points for

=== Finals series ===
==== Qualifying and elimination finals ====
	Qualifying final
Sunday, 6 September (2:00pm)	Collegians 20.9 (129)	def.	De La Salle 12.5 (77)	Elsternwick Park	Report

	Elimination final
Sunday, 6 September (2:00pm)	Old Melburnians 11.6 (72)	def. by	Beaumaris 16.7 (103)	Trevor Barker Beach Oval	Report

==== Preliminary final ====
	Preliminary final
Sunday, 13 September (2:30pm)	De La Salle 11.12 (78)	def.	Beaumaris 7.16 (58)	Kennedy Community Centre	Report

==== Grand Final ====
	Premier B Men's Grand Final
Sunday, 20 September (2:30pm)	Collegians 10.19 (79)	def.	De La Salle 9.13 (67)	Trevor Barker Beach Oval	Report

== Premier B Women's ==
2026 Premier B Women's season
- Date: 17 April – 6 September 2026
- Teams: 8
- Premiers: Beaumaris; 2nd premiership

=== Ladder ===
Pos	Team	Pld	W	L	D	PF	PA	PP	Pts	Qualification or relegation
1	Beaumaris	16	15	1	0	753	346	217.6	60	Finals series
2	Old Melburnians	16	10	5	0	474	356	133.1	40	Finals series
3	Port Melbourne	16	9	7	0	694	471	147.3	36	Finals series
4	Williamstown CYMS	16	8	8	0	450	324	138.9	32	Finals series
5	Old Xaverians	16	8	8	0	565	547	103.3	32	
6	Parkside	16	6	10	0	528	740	71.4	24	
7	Glen Eira/Old McKinnon	16	4	12	0	466	479	97.3	16	
8	Old Yarra Cobras	16	4	12	0	382	838	45.6	16	

Source: VAFA.com.au
Rules for classification: 1) points; 2) percentage; 3) number of points for
Note:
- Old Melburnians forfeited to Beaumaris in round 11.
- Old Yarra Cobras left the VAFA at the conclusion of the 2026 season and will play in the Eastern Football Netball League in 2027.

=== Finals series ===
==== Qualifying and elimination finals ====
	Elimination final
Saturday, 22 August (11:50am)	Port Melbourne 8.10 (58)	def.	Williamstown CYMS 4.5 (29)	Coburg City Oval	Report

	Qualifying final
Saturday, 22 August (2:00pm)	Beaumaris 4.3 (27)	def.	Old Melburnians 2.4 (16)	Coburg City Oval	Report

==== Preliminary final ====
	Preliminary final
Saturday, 29 August (2:00pm)	Old Melburnians 4.3 (27)	def. by	Port Melbourne 3.10 (28)	Kennedy Community Centre	Report

==== Grand Final ====
	Premier B Women's Grand Final
Sunday, 6 September (6:30pm)	Beaumaris 9.4 (58)	def.	Port Melbourne	Kennedy Community Centre	Report

== Premier C Men's ==
2026 Premier C Men's season
- Date: 17 April – 19 September 2026
- Teams: 10
- Premiers: Pardale Vultures; 3rd premiership

=== Ladder ===
Pos	Team	Pld	W	L	D	PF	PA	PP	Pts	Qualification or relegation
1	Fitzroy	18	17	1	0	2224	879	253.0	68	Finals series
2	Parkdale Vultures	18	16	2	0	2136	922	231.7	64	Finals series
3	Hampton Rovers	18	13	5	0	1774	1314	135.0	52	Finals series
4	St Bedes/Mentone	18	12	6	0	1742	1100	158.4	48	Finals series
5	Mazenod	18	12	6	0	1556	1353	115.0	48	
6	PEGS	18	6	12	0	1126	1730	65.1	24	
7	Marcellin	18	4	14	0	1147	1826	62.8	16	
8	Glen Eira/Old McKinnon	18	4	14	0	942	1990	47.3	16	
9	Ormond	18	3	15	0	1331	1913	69.6	12	Relegated
10	Old Peninsula	18	3	15	0	1142	2093	54.6	12	Relegated

Source: VAFA.com.au
Rules for classification: 1) points; 2) percentage; 3) number of points for

=== Finals series ===
==== Qualifying and elimination finals ====
	Elimination final
Saturday, 5 September (2:00pm)	Hampton Rovers 4.9 (33)	def. by	St Bedes/Mentone 10.13 (73)	Trevor Barker Beach Oval	Report

	Qualifying final
Saturday, 5 September (2:20pm)	Fitzroy 8.5 (53)	def. by	Parkdale Vultures 9.14 (68)	Marcellin College	Report

==== Preliminary final ====
	Preliminary final
Sunday, 13 September (2:30pm)	Fitzroy 14.7 (91)	def.	St Bedes/Mentone 12.6 (78)	Trevor Barker Beach Oval	Report

==== Grand Final ====
	Premier C Men's Grand Final
Saturday, 19 September (2:30pm)	Parkdale Vultures 15.8 (98)	def.	Fitzroy 13.14 (92)	Trevor Barker Beach Oval	Report

== Division 1 Men's ==
2026 Division 1 Men's season
- Date: 17 April – 12 September 2026
- Teams: 10
- Premiers: Preston Bullants; 5th premiership

=== Ladder ===
Pos	Team	Pld	W	L	D	PF	PA	PP	Pts	Qualification or relegation
1	Preston Bullants	18	17	1	0	2094	1052	199.0	68	Finals series
2	Kew	18	14	4	0	2274	1012	224.7	56	Finals series
3	Prahran	18	13	5	0	1721	826	208.4	52	Finals series
4	Oakleigh	18	13	5	0	1932	1336	144.6	52	Finals series
5	Parkside	18	12	6	0	1801	1025	175.7	48	
6	St Mary's Salesian	18	8	10	0	1580	1491	106.0	32	
7	Brunswick	17	6	11	0	1141	1716	66.5	24	
8	Monash Blues	17	3	13	1	967	2148	45.0	14	
9	UHS-VU	18	2	15	1	917	2219	41.3	10	
10	Old Yarra Cobras	18	0	18	0	716	2318	30.9	0	

Source: VAFA.com.au
Rules for classification: 1) points; 2) percentage; 3) number of points for
Note:
- The round 2 match between Monash Blues and Brunswick was abandoned after a Brunswick player suffered a broken leg during the second quarter. Brunswick was leading 5.4 (34) to 2.3 (15) at the time, but because the match was abandoned before half-time, it was treated as a draw and both teams received two premiership points each.
- Old Yarra Cobras left the VAFA at the conclusion of the 2026 season and will play in the Eastern Football Netball League in 2027.

=== Finals series ===
==== Qualifying and elimination finals ====
	Elimination final
Saturday, 29 August (2:20pm)	Preston Bullants 17.18 (120)	def.	Kew 8.13 (61)	Kennedy Community Centre	Report

	Qualifying final
Sunday, 30 August (2:00pm)	Prahran 6.4 (40)	def.	Oakleigh 4.9 (33)	Kennedy Community Centre	Report

==== Preliminary final ====
	Preliminary final
Saturday, 5 September (2:00pm)	Kew 14.13 (97)	def.	Prahran 9.9 (63)	Waverley Oval	Report

==== Grand Final ====
	Division 1 Men's Grand Final
Saturday, 12 September (2:55pm)	Preston Bullants 12.9 (81)	def.	Kew 3.11 (29)	La Trobe University	Report

== Division 1 Women's ==
2026 Division 1 Women's season
- Date: 17 April – 6 September 2026
- Teams: 10
- Premiers: Power House; 1st premiership

=== Ladder ===
Pos	Team	Pld	W	L	D	PF	PA	PP	Pts	Qualification or relegation
1	Ormond	16	13	3	0	665	241	275.9	52	Finals series
2	Power House	16	12	4	0	677	282	240.1	48	Finals series
3	Marcellin	16	12	4	0	465	344	135.2	48	Finals series
4	Monash Blues	16	9	6	1	454	399	113.8	38	Finals series
5	Whitefriars	16	8	8	0	483	410	117.8	32	
6	Old Carey	16	5	11	0	317	554	57.2	20	
7	Oakleigh	16	2	13	1	278	567	49.0	10	
8	La Trobe University	16	2	14	0	141	506	27.9	8	

Source: VAFA.com.au
Rules for classification: 1) points; 2) percentage; 3) number of points for

=== Finals series ===
==== Qualifying and elimination finals ====
	Elimination final
Sunday, 23 August (2:00pm)	Marcellin 5.7 (37)	def.	Monash Blues 1.2 (8)	Coburg City Oval	Report

	Qualifying final
Sunday, 23 August (2:00pm)	Ormond 5.3 (33)	def. by	Power House 7.5 (47)	Jack Barker Oval	Report

==== Preliminary final ====
	Preliminary final
Saturday, 29 August (9:20am)	Ormond 5.3 (33)	def.	Marcellin 3.1 (19)	Kennedy Community Centre	Report

==== Grand Final ====
	Division 1 Women's Grand Final
Sunday, 6 September (9:40am)	Power House 8.3 (51)	def.	Ormond 4.4 (28)	Marcellin College	Report

== Division 2 Men's ==
2026 Division 2 Men's season
- Date: 17 April – 13 September 2026
- Teams: 10
- Premiers: Power House; 7th premiership

=== Ladder ===
Pos	Team	Pld	W	L	D	PF	PA	PP	Pts	Qualification or relegation
1	Whitefriars	18	14	4	0	1548	1311	118.1	56	Finals series
2	Power House	18	13	5	0	1673	1221	137.0	52	Finals series
3	MHSOB	18	13	5	0	1756	1419	123.7	52	Finals series
4	Canterbury	18	12	6	0	1817	1499	121.2	48	Finals series
5	Elsternwick	18	10	8	0	1653	1396	118.4	40	
6	West Brunswick	18	9	9	0	1332	1281	104.0	36	
7	Therry Penola	18	7	11	0	1201	1504	79.9	28	
8	South Melbourne Districts	18	6	12	0	1325	1401	94.6	24	
9	North Brunswick	18	4	14	0	1010	1454	69.5	16	Relegated
10	Aquinas	18	2	16	0	1065	1894	56.2	8	Relegated

Source: VAFA.com.au
Rules for classification: 1) points; 2) percentage; 3) number of points for

=== Finals series ===
==== Qualifying and elimination finals ====
	Elimination final
Sunday, 30 August (2:00pm)	MHSOB 22.12 (144)	def.	Canterbury 15.15 (105)	Marcellin College	Report

	Qualifying final
Sunday, 30 August (2:20pm)	Whitefriars 9.9 (63)	def. by	Power House 11.10 (76)	Marcellin College	Report

==== Preliminary final ====
	Preliminary final
Saturday, 5 September (2:00pm)	Whitefriars 15.15 (105)	def.	MHSOB 12.9 (81)	Marcellin College	Report

==== Grand Final ====
	Division 2 Men's Grand Final
Sunday, 13 September (2:40pm)	Power House 10.17 (77)	def.	Whitefriars 8.10 (58)	Elsternwick Park	Report

== Division 2 Women's ==
2026 Division 2 Women's season
- Date: 17 April – 6 September 2026
- Teams: 8
- Premiers: Richmond Central; 1st premiership

=== Ladder ===
Pos	Team	P	W	L	D	Pts	F	A	%	MR	Qualification or relegation
1	Richmond Central	16	12	4	0	48	507	236	214.83	75.00	Finals series
2	De La Salle	16	12	4	0	48	528	271	194.83	75.00	Finals series
3	St Mary's Salesian	16	11	5	0	44	415	240	172.92	68.75	Finals series
4	Old Camberwell	16	11	5	0	44	412	268	153.73	68.75	Finals series
5	Beaumaris	16	8	8	0	32	681	418	162.92	50.00	
6	MCC	16	5	11	0	20	413	551	74.95	31.25	
7	UHS-VU	16	5	11	0	20	290	403	71.96	31.25	
8	Hampton Rovers	16	3	13	0	12	296	569	52.02	18.75	

Source: VAFA.com.au
Rules for classification: 1) match ratio; 2) points; 3) percentage; 4) number of points for

=== Finals series ===
==== Qualifying and elimination finals ====
	Elimination final
Saturday, 22 August (2:00pm)	St Mary's Salesian 3.6 (24)	def. by	Old Camberwell 1.2 (8)	Waverley Oval	Report
The official match report lists the final score as St Mary's Salesians 3.6 (24) to Old Camberwell 1.2 (8), though Camberwell progressed to the preliminary final on account of a forfeit by St Mary's Salesians.

	Qualifying final
Sunday, 23 August (9:40am)	Richmond Central 3.7 (25)	def. by	De La Salle 5.5 (35)	Jack Barker Oval	Report

==== Preliminary final ====
	Preliminary final
Saturday, 29 August (9:40am)	Richmond Central 5.6 (36)	def.	Old Camberwell 2.1 (13)	Jack Barker Oval	Report

==== Grand Final ====
	Division 2 Women's Grand Final
Sunday, 6 September (9:20am)	De La Salle 1.5 (11)	def. by	Richmond Central 2.5 (17)	Marcellin College	Report

== Division 3 Men's ==
2026 Division 3 Men's season
- Date: 17 April – September 2026
- Teams: 5
- Premiers: Wattle Park; 4th premiership

=== Ladder ===
Pos	Team	Pld	W	L	D	PF	PA	PP	Pts	Qualification or relegation
1	Wattle Park	14	14	0	0	1969	447	440.5	56	Finals series
2	Hawthorn	15	9	6	0	1590	1107	143.6	36	Finals series
3	Richmond Central	14	8	6	0	1077	944	114.1	32	Finals series
4	La Trobe University	14	4	10	0	823	1422	57.9	16	Finals series
5	Albert Park	15	1	14	0	652	2191	29.8	4	Finals series

Source: VAFA.com.au
Rules for classification: 1) points; 2) percentage; 3) number of points for
Note:
- The five-team structure in this division is a consequence of Box Hill North going into recess for 2026; the original fixture was drawn up with their presence as a six-team competition.

=== Finals series ===
==== Qualifying and elimination finals ====
	Elimination final
Saturday, 29 August (2:00pm)	Richmond Central 19.22 (136)	def.	La Trobe University 7.5 (47)	Jack Barker Oval	Report

	Qualifying final
Saturday, 29 August (2:00pm)	Wattle Park 18.9 (117)	def.	Hawthorn 3.6 (24)	Whitefriars College	Report

==== Preliminary final ====
	Preliminary final
Sunday, 6 September (2:20pm)	Hawthorn 4.8 (32)	def. by	Richmond Central 17.12 (114)	Marcellin College	Report

==== Grand Final ====
	Division 3 Men's Grand Final
Saturday, 12 September (2:00pm)	Wattle Park 23.14 (152)	def.	Richmond Central 9.6 (60)	Sir Douglas Nicholls Sporting Complex	Report

== Division 3 Women's ==
2026 Division 3 Women's season
- Date: 17 April – 5 September 2026
- Teams: 6
- Premiers: Parkdale Vultures; 1st premiership

=== Ladder ===
Pos	Team	Pld	W	L	D	PF	PA	PP	Pts	Qualification or relegation
1	Parkdale Vultures	15	13	2	0	821	207	396.6	52	Finals series
2	Hawthorn	16	13	3	0	657	362	181.5	52	Finals series
3	Old Haileybury	16	12	4	0	676	363	186.2	48	Finals series
4	Prahran/Collegians	16	9	7	0	557	337	165.3	36	Finals series
5	Caulfield Grammarians	16	3	13	0	188	387	48.6	12	
6	Old Yarra Cobras	15	1	14	0	117	565	20.7	4	

Source: VAFA.com.au
Rules for classification: 1) points; 2) percentage; 3) number of points for
Note:
- Prahran and Collegians agreed to form a joint women's team this season. The team was initially graded in Division 5, though after round 4 the side was elevated to Division 3.
- Old Yarra Cobras left the VAFA at the conclusion of the 2026 season and will play in the Eastern Football Netball League in 2027.

=== Finals series ===
==== Qualifying and elimination finals ====
	Elimination final
Saturday, 22 August (9:40am)	Old Haileybury 5.7 (37)	def.	Prahran/Collegians 2.1 (13)	Waverley Oval	Report

	Qualifying final
Saturday, 22 August (11:50am)	Parkdale Vultures 2.7 (19)	def.	Hawthorn 2.0 (12)	Waverley Oval	Report

==== Preliminary final ====
	Preliminary final
Sunday, 30 August (2:00pm)	Hawthorn 2.3 (15)	def. by	Old Haileybury 7.5 (47)	Jack Barker Oval	Report

==== Grand Final ====
	Division 3 Women's Grand Final
Saturday, 5 September (9:20am)	Parkdale Vultures 2.8 (20)	def.	Old Haileybury 2.3 (15)	Trevor Barker Beach Oval	Report

== Division 4 Women's ==
2026 Division 4 Women's season
- Date: 17 April – 5 September 2026
- Teams: 10
- Premiers: Aquinas; 1st premiership

=== Ladder ===
Pos	Team	Pld	W	L	D	PF	PA	PP	Pts	Qualification or relegation
1	Aquinas	15	11	4	0	634	269	235.7	44	Finals series
2	Mazenod	16	11	5	0	392	178	220.2	44	Finals series
3	Wattle Park	15	10	4	1	324	251	129.1	42	Finals series
4	Old Xaverians	14	9	5	0	394	327	120.5	36	Finals series
5	Brunswick	16	7	8	1	295	281	105.0	30	
6	Albert Park	15	7	8	0	308	294	104.8	28	
7	Canterbury	16	7	9	0	414	466	88.8	28	
8	University of Melbourne	16	7	9	0	385	499	77.2	28	
9	North Brunswick	16	6	10	0	263	531	49.5	24	
10	Fitzroy	16	4	12	0	207	375	55.2	16	

Source: VAFA.com.au
Rules for classification: 1) points; 2) percentage; 3) number of points for

=== Finals series ===
==== Qualifying and elimination finals ====
	Elimination final
Sunday, 23 August (11:50am)	Wattle Park 5.6 (36)	def.	Old Xaverians 5.3 (33)	Whitefriars College	Report

	Qualifying final
Sunday, 23 August (2:00pm)	Aquinas 1.12 (18)	def. by	Mazenod 3.2 (20)	Whitefriars College	Report

==== Preliminary final ====
	Preliminary final
Saturday, 29 August (9:40am)	Aquinas 7.10 (52)	def.	Wattle Park 1.1 (7)	Whitefriars College	Report

==== Grand Final ====
	Division 4 Women's Grand Final
Saturday, 5 September (9:20am)	Mazenod 1.2 (8)	def. by	Aquinas 6.4 (40)	Waverley Oval	Report

== Division 5 Women's ==
2026 Division 5 Women's season
- Date: 17 April – 5 September 2026
- Teams: 10
- Premiers: Ormond; 1st premiership

Pos	Team	Pld	W	L	D	PF	PA	PP	Pts	Qualification or relegation
1	Preston Bullants	16	13	3	0	606	239	253.6	52	Finals series
2	St Kevin's	16	11	4	1	591	274	215.7	46	Finals series
3	Elsternwick	16	10	6	0	530	403	131.5	40	Finals series
4	Ormond	16	9	7	0	482	177	272.3	36	Finals series
5	West Brunswick	16	8	8	0	493	450	109.6	32	
6	Parkside	16	7	8	1	524	509	102.9	30	
7	South Melbourne Districts	16	7	9	0	327	485	67.4	28	
8	Glen Eira/Old McKinnon	15	4	11	0	273	430	63.5	16	
9	Monash Blues	16	2	14	0	103	620	16.6	8	
10	De La Salle	15	1	14	0	97	1049	9.2	4	

Source: VAFA.com.au
Rules for classification: 1) points; 2) percentage; 3) number of points for

=== Finals series ===
==== Qualifying and elimination finals ====
	Elimination final
Sunday, 23 August (11:50am)	Elsternwick 4.3 (27)	def. by	Ormond 6.10 (46)	Jack Barker Oval	Report

	Qualifying final
Sunday, 23 August (11:50am)	Preston Bullants 4.9 (33)	def.	St Kevin's 2.3 (15)	Coburg City Oval	Report

==== Preliminary final ====
	Preliminary final
Sunday, 30 August (11:50am)	St Kevin's 3.4 (22)	def. by	Ormond 5.3 (33)	Jack Barker Oval	Report

==== Grand Final ====
	Division 5 Women's Grand Final
Saturday, 5 September (1:30pm)	Preston Bullants 3.9 (27)	def. by	Ormond 5.8 (38)	Carey Sports Complex	Report

== Minor grade premiers ==
=== Reserves grade ===
Reserves
Competition	Premiers	Competition	Premiers
Premier Men's Reserves	Old Xaverians	Premier B Men's Reserves	Old Carey
Premier C Men's Reserves	Fitzroy	Division 1 Men's Reserves	Parkside
Division 2 Men's Reserves	West Brunswick	Division 3 Men's Reserves	Richmond Central
Premier Women's Reserves	Caulfield Grammarians		

=== Under 19s grade ===
Under 19s
Competition	Premiers	Competition	Premiers
U19 Premier Men's	St Kevin's	U19 South Division 1 Men's	Old Haileybury
U19 North Division 1 Men's	Old Carey	U19 South Division 2 Men's	Parkdale Vultures
U19 North Division 2 Men's	Collegians	U19 South Division 3 Men's	Oakleigh
U19 Premier Women	Williamstown CYMS		

=== Thirds grade ===
Thirds
Competition	Premiers	Competition	Premiers
Thirds Premier Men's	Old Xaverians	Thirds Division 1 Men's	Old Xaverians
Thirds Division 2 Men's	Fitzroy	Thirds Division 3 Men's	Williamstown CYMS
Thirds Division 4 Men's	Marcellin	Thirds Division 5 Men's	Masala Dandenong
Thirds Division 6 Men's	Preston Bullants	Thirds Division 7 Men's	MHSOB

Source: VAFA results 2026

== Notable events ==
- The season started on 17 April (two weeks earlier than the previous year) following feedback from club presidents that the length of the season was too long, with one of the two-week "double byes" removed as a result.
- Following the death of 17-year-old VAFA umpire Ben Austin in October 2025, the VAFA introduced the Ben Austin Umpire Rising Star Award. A minute's silence was also held before the start of every match in round 1.
- In December 2025, Melbourne University announced it was at risk of withdrawing from the VAFA women's competition. The club had been regraded from Premier Division to Premier B mid-season after losing its first three matches by a combined margin of 368 points, but still finished the 2025 season with a percentage of just 9.1%. It moved to Division 4 in 2026, five tiers lower than it had started the previous season.
- Because of redevelopment at Allard Park taking longer than expected, North Brunswick played its home matches at ATC Cook Reserve and Jackson Reserve, with some training taking place at Fleming Park.

== See also ==
- List of Victorian Amateur Football Association premiers
