= 2025 VAFA season =

124th season of the Victorian Amateur Football Association

- Date: 5 April – 26 September 2025

The 2025 VAFA season was the 124th season of the Victorian Amateur Football Association (VAFA), the largest senior Australian rules football competition in Victoria. The season began on 5 April and concluded on 26 September.

In the men's competition, 60 teams participated across six divisions under a promotion and relegation system. In the women's competition, 60 teams participated across six divisions, with a mid-season regrading taking place after round 4.

== Association membership ==
Following the conclusion of the 2024 season, Bulleen Templestowe left the VAFA and moved to the Eastern Football Netball League (EFNL).

The newly-formed Port Melbourne Chargers Women's Football Club was admitted into the VAFA on 11 March 2025, entering its senior team in Premier B and a reserves team in Division 4.

== Premier Men's ==
2025 Premier Men's season
- Date: 5 April – 26 September 2025
- Teams: 10
- Premiers: Old Brighton; 1st Premier premiership
- Runners-up: Old Scotch; 8th Premier runners-up result
- Minor premiers: Old Brighton
- Relegated: Collegians; De La Salle
- JN Woodrow Medallist: Marcus Stavrou (Old Xaverians – 27 votes)
- Leading goalkicker: Andreas Stefanakis (Old Haileybury – 59 goals)
- Matches played: 94

Old Brighton won the Premier Men's premiership for the first time, defeating Old Scotch by 25 points in the grand final.

=== Clubs ===
==== Venues ====
Club	Location	Home venue(s)
Collegians	Albert Park	Harry Trott Oval
De La Salle	Malvern East	Waverley Park
Old Brighton	Brighton	Brighton Beach Oval
Old Haileybury	Caulfield South	Princes Park
Old Scotch	Camberwell	Camberwell Sports Ground
Old Xaverians	Armadale	Toorak Park
St Bernard's	Essendon West	St Bernard's College Oval
St Kevin's	Kooyong	TH King Oval
University Blacks	Parkville	University Oval
University Blues	Parkville	University Oval

==== Coach appointments ====
New coach	Club	Date of appointment	Previous coach	Ref
Matt Smith	University Blues	14 November 2024	Guy Martyn	

==== Club leadership ====
Club	Coach	Leadership group			Ref
Club	Coach	Captain(s)	Vice-captain(s)	Other leader(s)	Ref
Collegians	Jordie McKenzie				
De La Salle	Nick Hyland	Adrian Indovino			
Old Brighton	Marcel Bruin	Harry Hill			
Old Haileybury	Daniel Ward	Bredie Seccull	Brodie Steele		
Old Scotch	Mark Gnatt				
Old Xaverians	Daniel Donati				
St Bernard's	Steven Alessio				
St Kevin's	Anthony Lynch				
University Blacks	Dale Bower				
University Blues	Matt Smith				

=== Ladder ===
Pos	Team	Pld	W	L	D	PF	PA	PP	Pts	Qualification
1	Old Brighton (P)	18	16	2	0	1738	1038	167.4	64	Finals series
2	Old Xaverians	18	15	3	0	1804	1093	165.1	60	Finals series
3	St Kevin's	18	12	6	0	1491	1164	128.1	48	Finals series
4	Old Scotch	18	9	9	0	1410	1298	108.6	36	Finals series
5	Old Haileybury	18	9	9	0	1356	1405	96.5	36	
6	University Blacks	18	8	10	0	1163	1462	79.5	32	
7	St Bernard's	18	7	10	1	1316	1593	82.6	30	
8	University Blues	18	6	10	2	1198	1361	88.0	28	
9	Collegians	18	6	11	1	1243	1300	95.6	26	Relegated to Premier B
10	De La Salle	18	0	18	0	909	1914	47.5	0	Relegated to Premier B

Rules for classification: 1) points; 2) percentage; 3) number of points for.
(P) Premiers

=== Finals ===
Semi-finals
1	Old Brighton	13.15 (93)
2	Old Xaverians	9.6 (60)
3	St Kevin's	8.11 (59)
4	Old Scotch	12.10 (82)

Preliminary final
Old Xaverians	14.9 (93)
Old Scotch	14.10 (94)

Grand Final
Old Brighton	10.17 (77)
Old Scotch	7.10 (52)

==== Semi-finals ====
	Semi-finals
Saturday, 13 September (2:00pm)	St Kevin's 8.11 (59)	def. by	Old Scotch 12.10 (82)	Trevor Barker Beach Oval
Saturday, 13 September (2:30pm)	Old Brighton 13.15 (93)	def.	Old Xaverians 9.6 (60)	Elsternwick Park

==== Preliminary final ====
	Preliminary final
Saturday, 20 September (2:10pm)	Old Xaverians 14.9 (93)	def. by	Old Scotch 14.10 (94)	Elsternwick Park

==== Grand Final ====
2025 VAFA Premier Men's Grand Final
Friday, 26 September (2:30pm)	Old Brighton	def.	Old Scotch	Elsternwick Park
0.1 (1); 4.9 (33); 6.12 (48); 10.17 (77)	Q1; Q2; Q3; Final	1.3 (9); 1.5 (11); 3.7 (25); 7.10 (52)	Umpires: J. Gibson, P. Sexton, D. Silfo; Jock Nelson Medal: Will Lewis (Old Brighton)
W. Lewis 4, H. Dick 2, J. Campigli, T. Fisher, A. Edgar, J. Hope	Goals	T. Farrer 3, W. Clark 2, J. Torney, B. Hays
W. Lewis	Best	S. Grant, T. Farrer, B. Easton, C. Cormack, A. Noblet, R. Walsh

=== Awards ===
==== Club best and fairest ====
Club	Winner	Ref
Collegians	Max Pinchbeck	
De La Salle	Tom Filipovic	
Old Brighton	Harry Hill	
Old Haileybury	Olli Hotton	
Old Scotch	Charlie Cormack	
Old Xaverians	Marcus Stavrou	
St Bernard's	Matt Sauro	
St Kevin's	Liam Gunson	
University Blacks	James Clark	
University Blacks	Kane Loftus	
University Blues	Darcy Chirgwin	

== Premier Women's ==
2025 Premier Women's season
- Date: 5 April – 21 September 2025
- Teams: 11
- Premiers: Old Scotch; 2nd Premier premiership
- Runners-up: Caulfield Grammarians; 1st Premier runners-up result
- Minor premiers: Caulfield Grammarians
- Regraded mid-season: ▼ Old Yarra Cobras ▼ Melbourne University
- MacInnes Medallist: Mia Cowan (Old Scotch – 22 votes)
- Leading goalkicker: Hannah Smith (St Kevin's – 46 goals)
- Matches played: 80

Old Scotch won the Premier Women's premiership for the second time and the second year in a row, defeating Caulfield Grammarians by five points in the grand final.

=== Clubs ===
==== Venues ====
Club	Location	Home venue(s)
Beaumaris	Beaumaris	Banksia Reserve
Beaumaris	Cheltenham	Cheltenham Reserve
Caulfield Grammarians	Caulfield East	Glen Huntly Park
Fitzroy	Fitzroy North	Brunswick Street Oval
Kew	Kew	Victoria Park
Melbourne University	Parkville	University Oval
Old Geelong	South Yarra	Como Park
Old Scotch	Camberwell	Camberwell Sports Ground
Old Scotch	Hawthorn	Scotch College
Old Yarra Cobras	Doncaster East	Doncaster Reserve
St Kevin's	Kooyong	Righetti Oval
West Brunswick	Parkville	McAlister Oval
Williamstown CYMS	Williamstown	Fearon Reserve
Williamstown CYMS	Newport	Loft Reserve

=== Ladder ===
Because teams did not play an equal number of home-and-away matches, the ladder was decided on match ratio.

Pos	Team	Pld	W	L	D	PF	PA	PP	Pts	M/R	Qualification
1	Caulfield Grammarians	17	15	2	0	789	270	292.2	60	88.2	Finals series
2	Old Scotch (P)	16	14	2	0	821	251	327.1	56	87.5	Finals series
3	St Kevin's	16	13	3	0	631	371	170.1	52	81.3	Finals series
4	Kew	16	8	8	0	560	485	103.2	32	50.0	Finals series
5	West Brunswick	16	8	8	0	511	495	103.2	32	50.0	
6	Fitzroy	17	7	10	0	437	598	73.1	28	41.2	
7	Old Geelong	16	5	11	0	434	603	72.0	20	31.3	
8	Williamstown CYMS	17	5	12	0	426	831	51.3	20	29.4	
9	Beaumaris (Note: Under the VAFA's regrading policy, a team that is moved to a higher section will retain their points for/against totals from the pre-regrading matches, but a team that is moved to a lower section will have all their points for/against totals from the pre-regrading matches removed.)	16	4	12	0	360	770	46.8	16	20.6	
–	Old Yarra Cobras	4	0	4	0	34	249	13.7	0	0.0	Regraded mid-season
–	Melbourne University	4	0	4	0	21	485	4.3	0	0.0	Regraded mid-season

Rules for classification: 1) match ratio; 2) points; 3) percentage; 4) number of points for.
(P) Premiers

=== Win–loss table ===
Home matches are indicated in bold.

+	Win		Regraded
−	Loss	X	Bye
	Draw		Eliminated

Team	Home-and-away season																		Finals series		
Team	1	2	3	4	5	6	7	8	9	10	11	12	13	14	15	16	17	18	SF	PF	GF
Beaumaris	Premier B				CG -73	OGEL -10	**FITZ** **-11**	KEW -56	OSCO -46	**WBRU** **-56**	WCY +12	**SKOB** **-41**	CG -67	**OGEL** **-1**	**KEW** **-49**	WBRU +25	X	FITZ +20			
Caulfield Grammarians	**OYC** **+79**	WCY +62	OGEL +3	**KEW** **+29**	**BEAU** **+73**	SKOB +21	OSCO +4	**FITZ** **+9**	**WCY** **+41**	X	**OGEL** **+30**	WBRU +44	BEAU +67	KEW +15	**SKOB** **-2**	**OSCO** **-3**	FITZ +41	**WBRU** **+41**	**OSCO** **-6**	**SKOB** **+9**	OSCO -5
Fitzroy	KEW -21	**MUNI** **+80**	SKOB -16	OYC +76	**WCY** **+2**	**OSCO** **-31**	BEAU +11	CG -9	**OGEL** **-6**	**SKOB** **-16**	OSCO +109	**KEW** **-1**	WBRU +22	WCY +3	OGEL +3	X	**CG** **-41**	**FITZ** **+20**			
Kew	**FITZ** **+21**	OGEL -36	**WBRU** **+3**	CG -29	**SKOB** **-4**	X	**WCY** **+3**	**BEAU** **+56**	WBRU -3	OSCO -36	X	FITZ +1	SKOB +10	**CG** **-15**	BEAU +49	WCY +64	**OGEL** **+46**	**OSCO** **-35**	SKOB -8		
Melbourne University	SKOB -136	FITZ -80	**OSCO** **-152**	**WCY** **-96**	Premier B																
Old Geelong	WBRU +10	**KEW** **+36**	**CG** **-3**	OSCO -23	X	**BEAU** **+10**	SKOB +13	**OGEL** **-22**	FITZ +6	WCY -14	CG -30	X	**OSCO** **-57**	BEAU +1	**FITZ** **-3**	**SKOB** **-7**	KEW -46	**WCY** **-14**			
Old Scotch	WCY +87	**SKOB** **-13**	MUNI +152	**OGEL** **+23**	WBRU +18	FITZ +31	**CG** **-4**	X	**BEAU** **+46**	**KEW** **+36**	**FITZ** **+109**	**WCY** **+66**	OGEE +57	SKOB +20	X	CG +3	**WBRU** **+41**	KEW +35	CG +6	X	**CG** **+5**
Old Yarra Cobras	CG -79	WBRU -26	**WCU** **-71**	**FITZ** **-39**	Premier B																
St Kevin's	**MUNI** **+136**	OSCO +13	**FITZ** **+16**	WBRU +31	KEW +4	**CG** **-21**	OGEL +13	WCY -48	X	FITZ +16	**WBRU** **+44**	BEAU +41	**KEW** **+10**	**OSCO** **-20**	CG +2	OGEL +7	**WCY** **+108**	X	**KEW** **+8**	CG -6	
West Brunswick	**OGEL** **-15**	**OYC** **+26**	KEW -3	SKOB -31	**OSCO** **-18**	**WCY** **+60**	X	OGEL +22	**KEW** **+3**	BEAU +56	SKOB -44	**CG** **-44**	**FITZ** **+22**	X	WCY +19	**BEAU** **+25**	OSCO -41	CG -41			
Williamstown CYMS	**OSCO** **-87**	**CG** **-62**	OYC +71	MUNI +96	FITZ -2	WBRU -60	KEW -3	**SKOB** **+48**	CG -41	**OGEL** **+14**	**BEAU** **-12**	OSCO -66	X	**FITZ** **-3**	**WBRU** **-19**	**KEW** **-64**	SKOB -108	OGEL -14			

=== Finals ===
Semi-finals
1	Caulfield Grammarians	6.5 (41)
2	**Old Scotch**	**7.5 (45)**
3	**St Kevin's**	**5.5 (35)**
4	Kew	4.3 (27)

Preliminary final
**Caulfield Grammarians**	**5.5 (35)**
St Kevin's	4.5 (29)

Grand Final
**Old Scotch**	**4.9 (33)**
Caulfield Grammarians	4.4 (28)

==== Semi-finals ====
	Semi-finals
Saturday, 6 September (9:40am)	**St Kevin's 5.5 (35)**	def.	Kew 4.3 (27)	Genis Steel Oval
Saturday, 6 September (11:40am)	Caulfield Grammarians 6.5 (41)	def. by	**Old Scotch 7.5 (45)**	Barry Plant Park

==== Preliminary final ====
	Preliminary final
Saturday, 6 September (2:00pm)	**Caulfield Grammarians 5.5 (35)**	def.	St Kevin's 4.5 (29)	Elsternwick Park

==== Grand Final ====
2025 VAFA Premier Women's Grand Final
Sunday, 21 September (2:30pm)	**Old Scotch**	def.	Caulfield Grammarians	Elsternwick Park
0.1 (1); 3.2 (20); 4.8 (32); 4.9 (33)	**Q1; Q2; Q3; Final**	1.2 (8); 2.4 (16); 2.4 (16); 4.4 (28)	Best on ground: Jordan Mifsud (Old Scotch)
J. Mifsud 2, M. Cowan, L. Murphy	**Goals**	E. Angelopoulos, N. Barbara, C. O'Malley, M. Purcell
J. Mifsud, K. Hunter-Scott, E. Tassiopoulos, S. McIntosh, I. Tuttle, S. Fortunato	**Best**	I. Mottram, O. Rundle, C. O'Malley, J. Baxter, E. Cleland, M. Purcell

== Premier B Men's ==
2025 Premier B Men's season
- Date: 5 April – 20 September 2025
- Teams: 10
- Premiers: Old Trinity; 6th Premier B premiership
- Runners-up: Caulfield Grammarians; 4th Premier B runners-up result
- Minor premiers: Old Ivanhoe
- Promoted: Old Trinity; Caulfield Grammarians
- Relegated: Fitzroy; Hampton Rovers
- GT Moore Medallist: Billy Murphy (Old Ivanhoe – 21 votes)
- Leading goalkicker: Liam Thomas (Old Camberwell – 57 goals)
- Matches played: 94

Old Trinity won the Premier B Men's premiership for the sixth time, defeating Caulfield Grammarians by 12 points in the grand final.

=== Clubs ===
==== Venues ====
Club	Location	Home venue(s)
Caulfield Grammarians	Caulfield East	Glen Huntly Park
Fitzroy	Fitzroy North	Brunswick Street Oval
Hampton Rovers	Hampton	Boss James Reserve
Old Camberwell	Balwyn North	Gordon Barnard Reserve
Old Carey	Bulleen	Carey Sports Complex
Old Geelong	South Yarra	Como Park
Old Ivanhoe	Ivanhoe	Chelsworth Park
Old Melburnians	Brighton	Elsternwick Park
Old Trinity	Bulleen	Daley Oval
Williamstown CYMS	Williamstown	Fearon Reserve

=== Ladder ===
Pos	Team	Pld	W	L	D	PF	PA	PP	Pts	Qualification
1	Old Ivanhoe	18	14	4	0	1673	1239	135.0	56	Finals series
2	Old Trinity (P)	18	14	4	0	1553	1166	133.2	56	Finals series
3	Caulfield Grammarians	18	12	6	0	1521	1353	112.4	48	Finals series
4	Old Carey	18	11	7	0	1599	1450	110.3	44	Finals series
5	Williamstown CYMS	18	10	8	0	1552	1291	120.2	40	
6	Old Camberwell	18	10	8	0	1437	1287	111.7	40	
7	Old Geelong	18	9	9	0	1424	1430	99.6	36	
8	Old Melburnians	18	7	11	0	1451	1418	102.3	28	
9	Fitzroy	18	3	15	0	1218	1634	74.5	12	Relegated to Premier C
10	Hampton Rovers	18	0	18	0	950	2110	45.0	0	Relegated to Premier C

Rules for classification: 1) points; 2) percentage; 3) number of points for.
(P) Premiers

=== Finals ===
Semi-finals
1	Old Ivanhoe	9.13 (67)
2	Old Trinity	12.12 (84)
3	Caulfield Grammarians	13.18 (96)
4	Old Carey	6.10 (46)

Preliminary final
Old Ivanhoe	6.10 (46)
Caulfield Grammarians	19.7 (121)

Grand Final
Old Trinity	12.11 (83)
Caulfield Grammarians	10.11 (71)

==== Semi-finals ====
	Semi-finals
Saturday, 6 September (2:00pm)	Old Ivanhoe 9.13 (67)	def. by	Old Trinity 12.12 (84)	Genis Steel Oval
Sunday, 7 September (2:20pm)	Caulfield Grammarians 13.18 (96)	def.	Old Carey 6.10 (46)	Genis Steel Oval

==== Preliminary final ====
	Preliminary final
Saturday, 13 September (2:30pm)	Old Ivanhoe 9.8 (62)	def. by	Caulfield Grammarians 19.7 (121)	Genis Steel Oval

==== Grand Final ====
2025 VAFA Premier B Men's Grand Final
Saturday, 20 September (2:30pm)	Old Trinity	def.	Caulfield Grammarians	Trevor Barker Beach Oval
4.3 (27); 11.5 (71); 11.9 (75); 12.11 (83)	Q1; Q2; Q3; Final	3.6 (24); 5.6 (36); 8.10 (58); 10.11 (71)
B. Dowling 3, H. Beasley 2, J. Jenkins 2, D. Payman 2, B. Curtain, L. Davidson, H. McGlashan	Goals	C. Cooke 2, J. Dobosz 2, T. Williams 2, J. Ellwood, S. Hankin, S. McInerney, J. Webster
H. Thompson, C. Manoussakis, B. Dowling, J. Jenkins, T. Ferrier, S. Phillips	Best	C. Eerhard, J. Webster, C. Cooke, J. Hutchings, S. McInerney, N. Sutherland

== Premier B Women's ==
2025 Premier B Women's season
- Date: 5 April – 7 September 2025
- Teams: 12
- Premiers: Old Brighton; 1st Premier B premiership
- Runners-up: Old Melburnians
- Minor premiers: Old Brighton
- Regraded mid-season: ▲ Beaumaris ▼ Parkdale Vultures ▼ Coburg
- Best and fairest: Maddi Wilson (St Bedes/Mentone Tigers – 26 votes)
- Leading goalkicker: Georgia Harris (Port Melbourne Chargers – 46 goals)
- Matches played: 80

Old Brighton won the Premier B Women's premiership for the first time, defeating Old Melburnians by 23 points in the grand final.

=== Ladder ===
Because teams did not play an equal number of home-and-away matches, the ladder was decided on match ratio.

Pos	Team	Pld	W	L	D	PF	PA	PP	Pts	M/R	Qualification
1	Old Brighton (P)	15	14	1	0	833	231	360.6	56	93.3	Finals series
2	Old Melburnians	15	11	4	0	780	270	288.9	44	73.3	Finals series
3	Port Melbourne Chargers	15	10	5	0	928	318	291.8	40	66.7	Finals series
4	Westbourne	16	8	8	0	508	293	173.4	32	57.1	Finals series
5	St Bedes/Mentone Tigers	14	6	7	1	516	550	93.8	26	46.4	Withdrew post-season
6	Old Yarra Cobras	14	5	9	0	417	409	102.0	20	35.7	
7	Marcellin	15	5	10	0	524	677	77.4	20	33.3	
8	Old Xaverians	15	4	10	1	436	718	60.7	18	30.0	
9	Melbourne University	11	0	11	0	73	804	9.1	0	0.0	
–	Beaumaris	4	4	0	0	295	67	440.3	16	100	Regraded mid-season
–	Parkdale Vultures	4	0	4	0	36	466	7.7	0	0.0	Regraded mid-season
–	Coburg	4	0	4	0	3	526	0.6	0	0.0	Regraded mid-season

Rules for classification: 1) match ratio; 2) points; 3) percentage; 4) number of points for.
(P) Premiers

=== Finals ===
Semi-finals
1	Old Brighton	3.6 (24)
2	Old Melburnians	3.7 (25)
3	Port Melbourne Chargers	3.5 (23)
4	Westbourne	4.3 (27)

Preliminary final
Old Brighton	4.18 (42)
Westbourne	2.1 (13)

Grand Final
Old Melburnians	5.7 (37)
Old Brighton	9.6 (60)

==== Semi-finals ====
	Semi-finals
Saturday, 23 August (11:40am)	Port Melbourne Chargers 3.5 (23)	def. by	Westbourne 4.3 (27)	Elsternwick Park
Saturday, 23 August (2:00pm)	Old Brighton 3.6 (24)	def. by	Old Melburnians 3.7 (25)	Elsternwick Park

==== Preliminary final ====
	Preliminary final
Sunday, 31 August (11:40am)	Old Brighton 4.18 (42)	def.	Westbourne 2.1 (13)	Barry Plant Park

==== Grand Final ====
2025 VAFA Premier B Women's Grand Final
Saturday, 20 September (2:30pm)	Old Melburnians	def. by	Old Brighton	Barry Plant Park
1.1 (7); 1.1 (7); 2.5 (17); 5.7 (37)	Q1; Q2; Q3; Final	1.0 (6); 5.5 (35); 5.5 (35); 9.6 (60)	Felicity Frederico Medal: Scout Howden (Old Brighton)

== Premier C Men's ==
2025 Premier C Men's season
- Date: 5 April – 21 September 2025
- Teams: 10
- Premiers: Beaumaris; 3rd Premier C premiership
- Runners-up: AJAX; 5th Premier C runners-up result
- Minor premiers: Parkdale Vultures
- Promoted: Beaumaris; AJAX
- Relegated: Parkside; Prahran
- L Zachariah Medallist: Matthew Emmanouil (Parkdale Vultures – 18 votes)
- Leading goalkicker: Hayden Boyce (Mazenod – 51 goals)
- Matches played: 94

Beaumaris won the Premier C Men's premiership for the third time, defeating AJAX by 21 points in the grand final.

=== Ladder ===
Pos	Team	Pld	W	L	D	PF	PA	PP	Pts	Qualification
1	Parkdale Vultures	18	17	1	0	1800	1037	173.6	68	Finals series
2	Beaumaris (P)	18	16	2	0	1886	872	216.3	64	Finals series
3	St Bedes/Mentone Tigers	18	13	5	0	1649	1317	125.2	52	Finals series
4	AJAX	18	12	6	0	1608	1092	147.3	48	Finals series
5	PEGS	18	10	8	0	1333	1330	100.2	40	
6	Glen Eira	18	7	11	0	1251	1504	83.2	28	
7	Marcellin	18	7	11	0	1204	1606	75.0	28	
8	Mazenod	18	4	14	0	1184	1555	76.1	16	
9	Parkside	18	4	14	0	917	1585	57.9	16	Relegated to Division 1
10	Prahran	18	0	18	0	870	1804	48.2	0	Relegated to Division 1

Rules for classification: 1) points; 2) percentage; 3) number of points for.
(P) Premiers

=== Finals ===
Semi-finals
1	Parkdale Vultures	7.8 (50)
2	Beaumaris	13.23 (101)
3	St Bedes/Mentone Tigers	8.5 (53)
4	AJAX	7.16 (58)

Preliminary final
Parkdale Vultures	6.16 (52)
AJAX	14.13 (97)

Grand Final
Beaumaris	12.9 (81)
AJAX	8.12 (60)

==== Semi-finals ====
	Semi-finals
Saturday, 6 September (2:00pm)	Parkdale Vultures 7.8 (50)	def. by	Beaumaris 13.23 (101)	Trevor Barker Beach Oval
Sunday, 7 September (2:30pm)	St Bedes/Mentone Tigers 8.5 (53)	def. by	AJAX 7.16 (58)	Trevor Barker Beach Oval

==== Preliminary final ====
	Preliminary final
Sunday, 14 September (2:30pm)	Parkdale Vultures 6.16 (52)	def. by	AJAX 14.13 (97)	Trevor Barker Beach Oval

==== Grand Final ====
2025 VAFA Premier C Men's Grand Final
Sunday, 21 September (2:30pm)	Beaumaris	def.	AJAX	Trevor Barker Beach Oval
5.1 (31); 8.2 (50); 10.4 (64); 12.9 (81)	Q1; Q2; Q3; Final	2.2 (14); 4.6 (30); 6.8 (44); 8.12 (60)
M. Harms 3, T. Spencer 3, J. Cusack 2, J. Florent, J. Haeata, L. Hayes, B. Seers	Goals	J. Cohen 2, J. Parasol 2, N. Spitz 2, J. Israel, J. Vogel
C. Wilce, C. Heath, M. Harms, T. Spencer, K. Dyer, J. Haeata	Best	N. Spitz, E. Debinski, N. Lewis, T. Lipton, J. Israel, N. Pike

== Division 1 Men's ==
2025 Division 1 Men's season
- Date: 5 April – 14 September 2025
- Teams: 10
- Premiers: Old Peninsula; 1st Division 1 premiership
- Runners-up: Ormond; 4th Division 1 runners-up result
- Minor premiers: Ormond
- Promoted: Old Peninsula; Ormond
- Relegated: Therry Penola; Elsternwick
- LS Pepper Medallist: Luke Ashen (Oakleigh – 26 votes)
- Leading goalkicker: Luke Ashen (Oakleigh – 71 goals)
- Matches played: 94

Old Peninsula won the Division 1 Men's premiership for the first time, defeating Ormond by 74 points in the grand final. It was the club's first senior premiership.

=== Ladder ===
Pos	Team	Pld	W	L	D	PF	PA	PP	Pts	Qualification
1	Ormond	18	18	0	0	1908	1234	154.6	72	Finals series
2	Old Peninsula (P)	18	14	4	0	2026	1282	158.0	56	Finals series
3	Kew	18	12	6	0	1744	1329	131.2	48	Finals series
4	Oakleigh	18	11	7	0	1729	1390	124.4	44	Finals series
5	Preston Bullants	18	11	7	0	1659	1449	114.5	44	
6	UHS-VU	18	9	9	0	1489	1406	105.9	36	
7	Brunswick	18	6	12	0	1438	1576	91.2	24	
8	Monash Blues	18	5	13	0	1155	1617	71.4	20	
9	Therry Penola	18	3	15	0	1060	1994	53.2	12	Relegated to Division 2
10	Elsternwick	18	1	17	0	1151	2082	55.3	4	Relegated to Division 2

Rules for classification: 1) points; 2) percentage; 3) number of points for.
(P) Premiers

=== Finals ===
Semi-finals
1	Ormond	13.16 (94)
2	Old Peninsula	11.11 (77)
3	Kew	11.9 (75)
4	Oakleigh	4.12 (36)

Preliminary final
Old Peninsula	17.13 (115)
Kew	8.11 (59)

Grand Final
Ormond	6.17 (53)
Old Peninsula	19.13 (127)

==== Semi-finals ====
	Semi-finals
Saturday, 30 August (2:00pm)	Ormond 13.16 (94)	def.	Old Peninsula 11.11 (77)	Trevor Barker Beach Oval
Saturday, 30 August (2:00pm)	Kew 11.9 (75)	def.	Oakleigh 4.12 (36)	Barry Plant Park

==== Preliminary final ====
	Preliminary final
Sunday, 7 September (2:00pm)	Old Peninsula 17.13 (115)	def.	Kew 8.11 (59)	Box Hill City Oval

==== Grand Final ====
2025 VAFA Division 1 Men's Grand Final
Sunday, 14 September (2:10pm)	Ormond	def. by	Old Peninsula	Box Hill City Oval
2.7 (19); 2.10 (22); 5.15 (45); 6.17 (53)	Q1; Q2; Q3; Final	4.1 (25); 9.7 (61); 11.8 (74); 19.13 (127)

=== Awards ===
==== Team of the Year ====
2025 VAFA Division 1 Men's Team of the Year
B:	Luke Green (Preston Bullants)	Matt Oaten (Ormond)	Sean Callander (Therry Penola)
HB:	Ben Williamson (Old Peninsula)	Jeremy Simon (Ormond)	Fintan Davis (Kew)
C:	Fletcher Banfield (Brunswick)	Kurt Thiele (Old Peninsula)	James Flett (Monash Blues)
HF:	Daniel Marchese (Elsternwick)	Tom Hill (Preston Bullants) (c)	Regan Smith (Kew)
F:	Brandon Jackson (UHS-VU)	Luke Ashen (Oakleigh)	Bailey Payze (Old Peninsula)
Foll:	Flynn O'Toole (Ormond)	Hugh Peacock (Old Peninsula)	Jack Mason (Ormond)
Int:	Oscar Watt (Brunswick)	Oliver Thomson (Oakleigh)	Aaron Taylor (Ormond)
Int:	Alex Chiocci (Kew)		
Coach:	Kyle Pinto (Ormond)		

== Division 1 Women's ==
2025 Division 1 Women's season
- Date: 5 April – 8 September 2025
- Teams: 11
- Premiers: Glen Eira/Old McKinnon; 1st Division 1 premiership
- Runners-up: Monash Blues
- Minor premiers: Glen Eira/Old McKinnon
- Regraded mid-season: ▼ Hawthorn
- Best and fairest: Tiarna Jericho (Monash Blues – 32 votes)
- Leading goalkicker: Abbey Duggan (Therry Penola – 26 goals)
- Matches played: 80

Glen Eira/Old McKinnon won the Division 1 Women's premiership for the first time, defeating Monash Blues by 21 points in the grand final.

=== Ladder ===
Pos	Team	Pld	W	L	D	PF	PA	PP	Pts	Qualification
1	Glen Eira/Old McKinnon (P)	16	16	0	0	821	269	305.2	64	Finals series
2	Monash Blues	16	12	4	0	669	296	226.0	48	Finals series
3	Oakleigh	16	12	4	0	588	295	199.3	48	Finals series
4	Whitefriars	16	9	7	0	579	406	142.6	36	Finals series
5	Power House	16	8	8	0	427	414	103.1	32	
6	Hampton Rovers	16	7	9	0	548	480	114.2	28	
7	Therry Penola	16	6	10	0	570	647	88.1	24	
8	Richmond Central	16	6	10	0	379	443	85.6	24	
9	Old Haileybury	16	3	13	0	396	1033	38.3	12	
10	Parkdale Vultures	16	1	15	0	164	562	29.2	4	
–	Hawthorn	4	0	4	0	32	328	9.8	0	Regraded mid-season

Rules for classification: 1) points; 2) percentage; 3) number of points for.
(P) Premiers

== Division 2 Men's ==
2025 Division 2 Men's season
- Date: 5 April – 14 September 2025
- Teams: 10
- Premiers: St Mary's Salesian; 1st Division 2 premiership
- Runners-up: Old Yarra Cobras; 2nd Division 2 runners-up result
- Minor premiers: Old Yarra Cobras; 1st Division 2 minor premiership
- Promoted: St Mary's Salesian; Old Yarra Cobras
- Relegated: Aquinas; Hawthorn
- J Fullerton Medallist: Ben Ablett (West Brunswick – 22 votes)
- Leading goalkicker: Jacob McElroy (St Mary's Salesian – 69 goals)
- Matches played: 94

St Mary's Salesian won the Division 2 Men's premiership for the first time, defeating Old Yarra Cobras by three points in the grand final. It was the club's first senior men's premiership.

The round 5 match between Old Yarra Cobras and Whitefriars was abandoned after Cobras player Matt Falkingham suffered a broken arm during the second quarter.

=== Clubs ===
==== Venues ====
Club	Location	Home venue(s)
Aquinas	Ringwood	Aquinas College
Canterbury	Surrey Hills	Canterbury Sports Ground
Hawthorn	Hawthorn East	Rathmines Road Reserve
MHSOB	South Yarra	Woodfull-Miller Oval
Old Yarra Cobras	Bulleen	Koonung Park
South Melbourne Districts	Albert Park	Lindsay Hassett Oval
St John's	Dandenong	Thomas Carroll Reserve
St Mary's Salesian	Glen Iris	Ferndale Park
West Brunswick	Parkville	Ransford Oval
Whitefriars	Donvale	Whitefriars College Oval

=== Ladder ===
Pos	Team	Pld	W	L	D	PF	PA	PP	Pts	Qualification
1	Old Yarra Cobras	18	15	2	1	1956	1063	184.0	62	Finals series
2	St Mary's Salesian (P)	18	15	3	0	1878	1155	162.6	60	Finals series
3	West Brunswick	18	13	5	0	1707	1172	145.6	52	Finals series
4	South Melbourne Districts	18	11	7	0	1284	1216	105.6	44	Finals series
5	MHSOB	18	9	9	0	1613	1515	106.5	36	
6	Whitefriars	18	8	9	1	1481	1588	93.3	34	
7	Canterbury	18	8	10	0	1730	1714	100.9	32	
8	St John's	18	6	12	0	1437	1846	77.8	24	Transferred to SFNL
9	Aquinas	18	2	16	0	1114	1901	58.6	8	Reprieved from relegation
10	Hawthorn	18	2	16	0	1159	2189	52.9	8	Relegated to Division 3

Rules for classification: 1) points; 2) percentage; 3) number of points for.
(P) Premiers

=== Finals ===
Semi-finals
1	Old Yarra Cobras	8.8 (56)
2	St Mary's Salesian	8.7 (55)
3	West Brunswick	8.6 (54)
4	South Melbourne Districts	8.9 (57)

Preliminary final
St Mary's Salesian	13.11 (89)
South Melbourne Districts	9.10 (64)

Grand Final
Old Yarra Cobras	7.13 (55)
St Mary's Salesian	8.10 (58)

==== Semi-finals ====
	Semi-finals
Saturday, 30 August (2:00pm)	Old Yarra Cobras 8.8 (56)	def.	St Mary's Salesian 8.7 (55)	Genis Steel Oval
Saturday, 30 August (2:00pm)	West Brunswick 8.6 (54)	def. by	South Melbourne Districts 8.9 (57)	Martin Reserve

==== Preliminary final ====
	Preliminary final
Sunday, 7 September (2:55pm)	St Mary's Salesian 13.11 (89)	def.	South Melbourne Districts 9.10 (64)	Elsternwick Park

==== Grand Final ====
2025 VAFA Division 2 Men's Grand Final
Sunday, 14 September (2:30pm)	Old Yarra Cobras	def. by	St Mary's Salesian	Dunshea Oval
3.2 (20); 5.7 (37); 7.8 (50); 7.13 (55)	Q1; Q2; Q3; Final	4.2 (26); 5.7 (37); 8.8 (56); 8.10 (58)

=== Awards ===
==== Team of the Year ====
2025 VAFA Division 2 Men's Team of the Year
B:	Rory Chipman (Old Yarra Cobras)	Ben Hunt (South Melbourne Districts)	Angus Molden (St Mary's Salesian)
HB:	Michael Tobb (Canterbury)	Mitch Barry (St John's)	Joel Krauss (West Brunswick)
C:	Brock Ward (West Brunswick)	Emlyn Nettleton (West Brunswick)	Seb Gotch (Canterbury)
HF:	James Perrin (Whitefriars)	Jack Hall (Old Yarra Cobras)	Will Hellier (MHSOB)
F:	Jacob McElroy (St Mary's Salesian)	Mathew Pereira (MHSOB)	Tom Foley (South Melbourne Districts)
Foll:	Michael Wheeler (Canterbury)	Ben Ablett (West Brunswick) (c)	Ben Tricarico (St Mary's Salesian)
Int:	Harry Flack (Aquinas)	Herbert Fithall (West Brunswick)	Wil Fleming (Hawthorn)
Int:	Tom Bell (Old Yarra Cobras)		
Coach:	Clay Tait (St Mary's Salesian)		

==== Club best and fairest ====
Club	Winner	Ref
Aquinas	Harry Flack	
Canterbury	Michael Topp	
Hawthorn	Wil Fleming	
MHSOB		
Old Yarra Cobras		
South Melbourne Districts		
St John's		
St Mary's Salesian		
West Brunswick		
Whitefriars		

== Division 2 Women's ==
2025 Division 2 Women's season
- Date: 5 April – 7 September 2025
- Teams: 11
- Premiers: La Trobe University; 1st Division 2 premiership
- Runners-up: Parkside
- Minor premiers: Old Carey
- Regraded mid-season: ▼ Wattle Park
- Best and fairest: Emogen Johnson (Hawthorn – 24 votes)
- Leading goalkicker: Martina Zeevaarder (Parkside – 23 goals)
- Matches played: 76

La Trobe University won the Division 2 Women's premiership for the first time, defeating Parkside by three points in the grand final.

=== Ladder ===
Because teams did not play an equal number of home-and-away matches, the ladder was decided on match ratio.

Pos	Team	Pld	W	WF	L	LF	D	PF	PA	PP	Pts	M/R	Qualification
1	Old Carey	12	10	1	2	0	0	570	246	231.7	44	84.6	Finals series
2	Parkside	14	11	0	3	0	0	652	310	210.3	44	78.6	Finals series
3	La Trobe University (P)	13	9	1	4	0	0	402	190	211.6	40	71.4	Finals series
4	UHS-VU	13	7	0	5	0	1	328	323	101.6	30	57.7	Finals series
5	Box Hill North	13	7	1	6	0	0	511	387	132.0	32	57.1	
6	De La Salle	13	6	0	6	0	1	312	405	77.0	26	50.0	
7	Hawthorn	14	6	0	8	0	0	299	305	98.0	24	42.8	
8	Brunswick	13	5	0	8	0	0	350	361	97.0	20	38.5	
9	Aquinas	14	4	0	10	0	0	363	457	79.4	16	28.6	
10	MCC	14	4	0	10	0	0	341	486	70.2	16	28.6	
11	Coburg	7	0	0	7	3	0	62	636	9.7	0	0.0	
–	Wattle Park	4	0	0	4	0	0	56	166	33.7	0	0.0	Regraded mid-season

Rules for classification: 1) match ratio; 2) points; 3) percentage; 4) number of points for.
(P) Premiers

== Division 3 Men's ==
2025 Division 3 Men's season
- Date: 5 April – 14 September 2025
- Teams: 10
- Premiers: Power House; 2nd Division 3 premiership
- Runners-up: North Brunswick; 1st Division 3 runners-up result
- Minor premiers: Power House
- Promoted: Power House; North Brunswick
- Hutchinson Medallist: Harry Davis (Wattle Park – 34 votes)
- Leading goalkicker: Blake Williams (Box Hill North – 85 goals)
- Matches played: 94

Power House won the Division 3 Men's premiership for the second time, defeating North Brunswick by 84 points in the grand final.

=== Ladder ===
Pos	Team	Pld	W	L	D	PF	PA	PP	Pts	Qualification
1	Power House (P)	18	15	3	0	2270	871	260.6	60	Finals series
2	Wattle Park	18	15	3	0	2068	1071	193.1	60	Finals series
3	North Brunswick	18	13	5	0	1896	933	203.2	52	Finals series
4	Richmond Central	18	13	5	0	1937	957	202.4	52	Finals series
5	Box Hill North	18	11	7	0	1635	1302	125.6	44	
6	Albert Park	18	10	8	0	1737	1265	137.3	40	
7	La Trobe University	18	6	12	0	1318	1538	85.7	24	
8	Swinburne University	18	4	14	0	1094	1852	59.1	16	Moved to VAFA Thirds
9	Chadstone	18	3	15	0	1012	2430	41.6	12	Moved to VAFA Thirds
10	Eley Park	18	0	18	0	611	3359	18.2	0	Moved to VAFA Thirds

Rules for classification: 1) points; 2) percentage; 3) number of points for.
(P) Premiers

=== Finals ===
Semi-finals
1	Power House	11.14 (80)
2	Wattle Park	8.4 (52)
3	North Brunswick	10.10 (70)
4	Richmond Central	4.8 (32)

Preliminary final
Wattle Park	7.9 (51)
North Brunswick	8.6 (54)

Grand Final
Power House	15.19 (109)
North Brunswick	3.7 (25)

==== Semi-finals ====
	Semi-finals
Sunday, 31 August (9:20am)	North Brunswick 10.10 (70)	def.	Richmond Central 4.8 (32)	Martin Reserve
Sunday, 31 August (2:00pm)	Power House 11.14 (80)	def.	Wattle Park 8.4 (52)	Martin Reserve

==== Preliminary final ====
	Preliminary final
Saturday, 6 September (12:00pm)	Wattle Park 7.9 (51)	def. by	North Brunswick 8.6 (54)	Elsternwick Park

==== Grand Final ====
2025 VAFA Division 3 Men's Grand Final
Sunday, 14 September (2:30pm)	Power House	def.	North Brunswick	Genis Steel Oval
3.8 (26); 3.11 (29); 11.17 (83); 15.19 (109)	Q1; Q2; Q3; Final	0.0 (0); 0.2 (2); 0.3 (3); 3.7 (25)

=== Awards ===
==== Team of the Year ====
2025 VAFA Division 3 Men's Team of the Year
B:	Zac Durrant (Wattle Park)	Richie Keane (Box Hill North)	Adam Tsardakis (North Brunswick)
HB:	Connor McCredden (La Trobe University)	Sasha Araldi (Richmond Central)	Luke Stubbs (Power House)
C:	Mitch Newman (Power House)	Harry Davis (Wattle Park) (c)	Nick Trewhella (North Brunswick)
HF:	Blake Williams (Box Hill North)	Simon Heather (Swinburne University)	Andrew Ramzy (North Brunswick)
F:	Ben Young (Richmond Central)	Thomas Wilson (Albert Park)	Michael Timmons (Power House)
Foll:	Beau Parthenides (Box Hill North)	Ben Circosta (Power House)	Zac Dicianni (North Brunswick)
Int:	Nathan Bird (Wattle Park)	Hristos Millaras (Chadstone)	Elias Manne (North Brunswick)
Int:	Zac Hayes (Eley Park)		
Coach:	Nick Cox (Power House)		

== Division 3 Women's ==
2025 Division 3 Women's season
- Date: 5 April – 6 September 2025
- Teams: 12
- Premiers: St Mary's Salesian; 1st Division 3 premiership
- Runners-up: Ormond
- Minor premiers: St Mary's Salesian
- Regraded mid-season: ▼ Canterbury ▼ Preston Bullants
- Best and fairest: Lucy Dobbyn (St Mary's Salesian – 26 votes)
- Leading goalkicker: Georgia Cropley (St Mary's Salesian – 49 goals); Indiana Harrison (Ormond – 49 goals)
- Matches played: 77

St Mary's Salesian won the Division 3 Women's premiership for the first time, defeating Ormond by two points in the grand final.

=== Clubs ===
==== Venues ====
Club	Location	Home venue(s)
Albert Park	St Kilda	Ian Johnson Oval
Canterbury	Surrey Hills	Canterbury Sports Ground
Elsternwick	Brighton	Holmes-Todd Oval
Mazenod	Glen Waverley	Central Reserve
North Brunswick	Brunswick East	Allard Park
Old Camberwell	Balwyn North	Gordon Barnard Reserve
Ormond	Ormond	EE Gunn Reserve
Prahran	Armadale	Toorak Park
Preston Bullants	Preston	Ruthven Reserve
South Melbourne Districts	St Kilda	Ian Johnson Oval
St Mary's Salesian	Glen Iris	Ferndale Park
Wattle Park	Burwood	Bennettswood Reserve

=== Ladder ===
Because teams did not play an equal number of home-and-away matches, the ladder was decided on match ratio.

Pos	Team	Pld	W	WF	L	LF	D	PF	PA	PP	Pts	M/R	Qualification
1	St Mary's Salesian	15	14	1	1	0	0	922	189	487.8	60	93.8	Finals series
2	Ormond	16	13	0	3	0	0	878	228	385.1	52	81.3	Finals series
3	Old Camberwell	14	10	2	4	0	0	621	212	292.9	48	75.0	Finals series
4	Albert Park	16	10	0	6	0	0	447	251	178.1	40	62.5	Finals series
5	Mazenod	16	10	0	6	0	0	337	328	102.7	40	62.5	
6	Wattle Park	16	7	0	9	0	0	263	215	122.3	28	43.8	
7	North Brunswick	16	7	0	9	0	0	416	353	117.9	28	43.8	
8	South Melbourne Districts	16	3	0	13	1	0	192	604	31.8	12	18.8	
9	Elsternwick	15	2	0	13	0	0	255	689	37.0	8	13.3	
10	Prahran	14	1	0	13	1	0	90	1015	8.9	4	6.7	
–	Canterbury	4	0	0	4	0	0	47	249	18.9	0	0.0	Regraded mid-season
–	Preston Bullants (Note: Preston Bullants were moved from Division 4 to Division 3 as part of the mid-season regrading, but were moved back down to Division 4 after two matches (including a forfeit).)	1	0	0	1	1	0	6	123	4.9	0	0.0	Regraded mid-season

Rules for classification: 1) match ratio; 2) points; 3) percentage; 4) number of points for.

== Division 4 Women's ==
2025 Division 4 Women's season
- Date: 5 April – 7 September 2025
- Teams: 13
- Premiers: Westbourne; 1st Division 4 premiership
- Runners-up: Old Yarra Cobras
- Minor premiers: Westbourne
- Regraded mid-season: ▲ Preston Bullants
- Best and fairest: Jacqui Morton (Old Yarra Cobras – 17 votes)
- Leading goalkicker: Hilary Donelan (Old Yarra Cobras – 18 goals)
- Matches played: 77

Westbourne won the Division 4 Women's premiership for the first time, defeating Old Yarra Cobras by twelve points in the grand final.

The majority of teams competing in Division 4 were reserves teams.

=== Ladder ===
Because teams did not play an equal number of home-and-away matches, the ladder was decided on match ratio.

Pos	Team	Pld	W	WF	L	LF	D	PF	PA	PP	Pts	M/R	Qualification
1	Westbourne (P)	14	11	3	3	0	0	678	110	616.4	48	85.7	Finals series
2	Caulfield Grammarians	9	7	1	2	0	0	512	150	341.3	32	80.0	Finals series
3	Old Yarra Cobras	14	11	0	3	0	0	505	96	526.0	44	78.6	Finals series
4	Port Melbourne Chargers	13	8	0	5	1	0	592	294	201.4	32	57.1	Finals series
5	Fitzroy	12	6	2	6	1	0	274	370	74.1	32	57.1	Finals series
6	Canterbury	14	6	0	8	0	0	344	353	97.5	24	42.8	
7	West Brunswick	12	4	2	8	0	0	305	427	71.4	24	42.8	
8	Preston Bullants	14	5	0	9	0	0	287	548	52.4	20	35.7	
9	St Kevin's	14	3	0	11	0	0	142	453	31.4	12	21.4	
10	Monash Blues	14	3	0	11	0	0	194	626	31.0	12	21.4	
11	Oakleigh	8	0	1	8	5	0	136	732	18.6	4	7.1	
–	Beaumaris	3	3	1	0	0	0	300	0	0.00	12	100	Withdrew after round 4
–	Old Xaverians	0	0	0	0	4	0	0	0	0.00	0	0.0	Withdrew after round 4

Rules for classification: 1) match ratio; 2) points; 3) percentage; 4) number of points for.
(P) Premiers

== Notable events ==
- Prior to round 1, the VAFA Umpires Association said it was considering "disruptions" to the 2025 season after having their bonuses for finals matches removed. The dispute was resolved on 3 April 2025, with umpires receiving an increase in practice match payments and reimbursements for visits to clubs during the pre-season.
- On 22 September 2025, University Blues under-19s player Will Richter died after being struck by a truck while cycling.
- On 29 October 2025, 17-year-old VAFA umpire Ben Austin died in hospital, one day after being struck in the neck by a ball in practice nets while playing cricket. Austin had made his senior Premier Men's umpiring debut in round 11 and officiated in the Premier Men's reserves grand final.
