= 1987 VAFA season =

87th season of the Victorian Amateur Football Association

- Date: 4 April − 27 September 1987
- Teams: 86

The 1987 VAFA season was the 87th season of the Victorian Amateur Football Association (VAFA). The season began on 4 April and ended on 27 September, with a total of 86 teams participating across eight divisions under a promotion and relegation system.

== Association membership ==
Four new − Aquinas, Bloods, Port Colts and Richmond Central − joined the VAFA prior to the start of the season. This resulted in the VAFA being expanded to eight divisions, with H Section created.

== Notable events ==
- Three-time Ivanhoe premiership player John "Plumber" Miles was awarded VAFA life membership.

== A Section ==
1987 VAFA A Section season
- Premiers: Ormond; 6th A Section premiership
- Minor premiers: Ormond
- Wooden spooners: Bulleen Templestowe
- Best and fairest: Frank Gleeson (Old Paradians)
- Leading goalkicker: Paul Schuhkraft (Ormond − 77 goals)

Ormond won their sixth A Section premiership, defeating Old Xaverians by 17 points. Ormond's premiership came exactly 50 years after their first A Section season.

Until 2021, this was the last time Caulfield Grammarians had won a senior game in A Section/Premier Division.

=== Ladder ===
Pos	Team	Pld	W	L	D	PF	PA	PP	Pts	Qualification
1	Ormond (P)	18	16	2	0	1887	1133	165.7	64	Finals series
2	Old Xaverians	18	14	3	1	1631	1235	132.1	58	Finals series
3	De La Salle	18	11	6	1	1558	1340	116.3	46	Finals series
4	Old Paradians	18	11	7	0	1597	1274	125.4	44	Finals series
5	Old Scotch	18	8	10	0	1614	1566	103.1	32	
6	University Blues	18	7	11	0	1440	1504	95.7	28	
7	Collegians	18	7	11	0	1484	1642	90.4	28	
8	North Old Boys	18	7	11	0	1493	1710	87.3	28	
9	Caulfield Grammarians	18	6	12	0	1493	2037	73.3	24	Relegation
10	Bulleen Templestowe	18	2	16	0	1251	1997	62.6	8	Relegation

Rules for classification: 1) points; 2) percentage; 3) number of points for.
(P) Premiers

=== Finals ===
	Semi-finals
Saturday, 31 October	De La Salle 10.13 (73)	def. by	Old Paradians 14.10 (94)
Saturday, 6 September (2:15pm)	Ormond 8.13 (61)	def. by	Old Xaverians 15.11 (101)	Elsternwick Park

	Preliminary final
Saturday, 13 September	Ormond 18.13 (121)	def. by	Old Paradians 15.14 (104)

Grand Final
Sunday, 20 September	Ormond	def.	Old Xaverians	Elsternwick Park
2.2 (14); 9.6 (60); 12.10 (82); 15.11 (101)	Q1; Q2; Q3; Final	4.4 (28); 7.5 (47); 9.9 (63); 12.12 (84)
3: Schuhkraft; 2: Suthrland, M. McDonald, Young, Cox; 1: Kingston, Nash, Tobin, McCooke	Goals	2: S. Curtain, Carlin, Burne; 1: Tiernan, Beatie, Meagher, Atkins, Callil, Bourke
P. Mehrten, Taylor, Cox, Hille, Nankervis, Young	Best	Ryan, J. Curtain, Beatie, P. Curtain, Varcoe, Greetham

== B Section ==
1987 VAFA B Section season
- Premiers: St Bernard's
- Minor premiers: St Bernard's
- Wooden spooners: St Kilda
- Best and fairest: Gary Williams (Parkside)
- Leading goalkicker: Chris Freeman (Parkside − 66 goals)

St Bernard's won their second B Second premiership, defeating Marcellin by 32 points. The finals series was extended by a week after St Bernard's drew with Therry in the second semi-final on 5 September, which led to a replay being held on 13 September.

=== Ladder ===
Pos	Team	Pld	W	L	D	PF	PA	PP	Pts	Qualification
1	St Bernard's (P)	18	14	4	0	1618	1252	129.2	56	Finals series
2	Therry	18	13	5	0	1820	1422	128.0	52	Finals series
3	Marcellin	18	13	5	0	1673	1366	122.5	52	Finals series
4	Parkside	18	12	6	0	1692	1558	108.6	48	Finals series
5	University Blacks	18	10	8	0	1788	1542	116.0	40	
6	Ivanhoe	18	7	11	0	1448	1637	88.5	28	
7	Old Trinity	18	6	12	0	1372	1672	82.0	24	
8	Fawkner	18	6	12	0	1409	1754	80.3	24	
9	Banyule	18	5	13	0	1527	1922	79.5	20	Relegation
10	St Kilda	18	4	14	0	1423	1645	86.5	16	Relegation

Rules for classification: 1) points; 2) percentage; 3) number of points for.
(P) Premiers

=== Finals ===
	Semi-finals
Saturday, 31 October	Marcellin 15.21 (111)	def.	Parkside 10.13 (73)
Saturday, 5 September (2:15pm)	St Bernard's 15.7 (97)	drew with	Therry 14.13 (97)	Northcote Park
Saturday, 13 September (replay)	St Bernard's 13.19 (97)	def.	Therry 7.12 (54)

	Preliminary final
Saturday, 19 September	Marcellin 21.21 (147)	def.	Therry 7.12 (54)

	Grand Final
Sunday, 27 September (2:00pm)	St Bernard's 19.10 (124)	def.	Marcellin 12.20 (92)	Elsternwick Park
Both teams promoted to A Section

== C Section ==
1987 VAFA C Section season
- Premiers: Monash Blues
- Minor premiers: Kew
- Wooden spooners: AJAX
- Best and fairest: Tony Fellow (Thomastown)
- Leading goalkicker: Matthew Cavanagh (Kew − 72 goals)

The Monash Blues won their second senior premiership, defeating Kew by 25 points in the graind final.

=== Ladder ===
Pos	Team	Pld	W	L	D	PF	PA	PP	Pts	Qualification
1	Kew	18	17	1	0	2347	1309	179.3	68	Finals series
2	Monash Blues (P)	18	14	4	0	1841	1447	127.2	56	Finals series
3	Old Melburnians	18	12	6	0	2231	1446	154.3	48	Finals series
4	Thomastown	18	11	7	0	1830	1564	117.0	44	Finals series
5	Old Brighton	18	11	7	0	1620	1422	113.9	44	
6	Balaclava	18	9	9	0	1891	1936	97.7	36	
7	Old Haileybury	18	6	12	0	1463	1629	89.8	24	
8	MHSOB	18	5	13	0	1542	2053	75.1	20	
9	Hampton Rovers	18	3	15	0	1256	2121	59.2	12	Relegation
10	AJAX	18	2	16	0	1304	2398	54.4	8	Relegation

Rules for classification: 1) points; 2) percentage; 3) number of points for.
(P) Premiers

=== Finals ===
Grand Final
Saturday, 5 September (2:15pm)	Kew	def. by	Monash Blues	Elsternwick Park
4.2 (26); 8.5 (53); 8.11 (59); 10.11 (71)	Q1; Q2; Q3; Final	1.4 (10); 4.7 (31); 6.13 (49); 13.18 (96)	Umpires: Kevin Segota, Greg Hardiman
3: C. Charalambopoulos; 2: Cavanagh; 1: Burden, Kalac, Schober, Busuttil, McLean	Goals	3: Alexander; 2: Connelly, Hildebrand, P. Forbes, Sturgess; 1: Gale, J. Quin
Griffiths, Busuttil. Kalac, Burden, Schober, Bria	Best	Sturgess, Hipwell, Gill, Carman, Culvenor, McGregor
Both teams promoted to B Section

==== Monash Blues team ====
Monash Blues 1987 grand final team
B:	Michael Hay	Chris Roberts	Richard Culvenor
HB:	Adrian Barker	Dan Carman	John Quin
C:	Greg Hipwell	Jamie Sturgess	Anthony Kiers
HF:	Peter Forbes	Ian Hildebrand	Brad Cornwell
F:	Justin Alexander	Peter Little	Stevie Connelly
Foll:	Tim Gill	Andrew McGregor	Graham Gale
Int:	Ian Kohler	John Johnstone	
Coach:	Brian Ford		

== D Section ==
1987 VAFA D Section season
- Premiers: Old Ivanhoe
- Minor premiers: St Kevin's
- Wooden spooners: Coburg
- Best and fairest: Gary Norton (Old Mentonians); Mark Dyson (Old Ivanhoe)
- Leading goalkicker: Rod Collins (Old Camberwell − 63 goals)

Following the conclusion of the season, Coburg went into recess prior to the start of the 1988 season, and folded shortly after.

=== Ladder ===
Pos	Team	Pld	W	L	D	PF	PA	PP	Pts	Qualification
1	St Kevin's	18	13	5	0	1713	1338	128.0	52	Finals series
2	Old Ivanhoe (P)	18	12	5	1	1849	1474	125.4	50	Finals series
3	Bulleen United	18	12	6	0	1763	1359	129.7	48	Finals series
4	Old Mentonians	18	12	6	0	1670	1295	129.0	48	Finals series
5	Old Camberwell	18	11	6	1	1702	1434	118.7	46	
6	Preston MBOB	18	10	8	0	1574	1272	123.7	40	
7	North Brunswick	18	8	10	0	1418	1606	88.3	32	
8	Elsternwick	18	7	11	0	1592	1730	92.0	28	
9	Heatherton	18	3	15	0	1135	2102	54.0	12	Relegation
10	Coburg	18	1	17	0	1223	2020	60.5	4	Relegation

Rules for classification: 1) points; 2) percentage; 3) number of points for.
(P) Premiers

=== Finals ===
Grand Final
Saturday, 5 September (2:15pm)	Old Ivanhoe	def.	St Kevin's	Bentleigh
6.2 (38); 9.6 (60); 15.8 (98); 21.10 (136)	Q1; Q2; Q3; Final	6.2 (38); 8.5 (53); 10.9 (69); 19.12 (126)	Umpires: Paul Cherry, Justin Toohey
5: Cockerill; 4: King; 3: Hockins, Davies; 1: Ball, N. Skalberg, Purcell, Howard, Colledge, Karakaltsas	Goals	6: Stone; 5: S. Kerr; 4: Watkin; 2: Callanan; 1: Sammartmo, P. Smith
Ball, Karakaltsas, P. Skalberg, Dyson, Davies, Cockerill	Best	Stone, Watkin, S. Kerr, Cross, G. Kerr, P. Joyce
Both teams promoted to C Section

== E Section ==
1987 VAFA E Section season
- Premiers: State Bank
- Minor premiers: Old Essendon
- Wooden spooners: Clayton
- Best and fairest: Vic Zanin (UHSOB)
- Leading goalkicker: David Jenkins (State Bank − 82 goals)

=== Ladder ===
Pos	Team	Pld	W	L	D	PF	PA	PP	Pts	Qualification
1	Old Essendon	18	14	2	2	1654	1091	151.6	60	Finals series
2	State Bank (P)	18	14	4	0	2230	1365	163.7	56	Finals series
3	St Bedes	18	13	5	0	1718	1216	141.3	52	Finals series
4	West Brunswick	18	13	5	0	1802	1359	132.6	52	Finals series
5	Brunswick	18	12	5	1	1852	1408	131.5	50	
6	Old Geelong	18	6	11	1	1457	1811	80.5	26	
7	UHSOB	18	6	12	0	1499	1806	83.0	24	
8	Power House	18	6	12	0	1304	1690	77.2	24	
9	Peninsula Old Boys	18	4	14	0	1166	1999	58.3	16	Relegation
10	Clayton	18	0	18	0	1078	2194	49.1	0	Relegation

Rules for classification: 1) points; 2) percentage; 3) number of points for.
(P) Premiers

=== Finals ===
Grand Final
Saturday, 5 September (2:15pm)	State Bank	def.	West Brunswick	Monash University
4.3 (27); 12.5 (77); 15.9 (99); 21.12 (138)	Q1; Q2; Q3; Final	2.3 (15); 2.4 (16); 2.6 (18); 6.8 (44)	Umpires: Mark Huntington, Andrew McRae
6: A. Rolfs; 4: Colbert; 2: Carboon, Beare; 1: Connolly, Hargreaves, Goldsmith, Jenkins, Twycross, Matherson, Dervan	Goals	3: Capron; 1: Rodgers, P. Magafas, McNeice
Bremner, Bukll, Wright, Wabbis, Matherson, Cloke	Best	Casley, Jackson, D. Lampard, S. Lampard, P. Magafas, Capron
Both teams promoted to D Section

== F Section ==
1987 VAFA F Section season
- Premiers: Aquinas
- Minor premiers: Aquinas
- Wooden spooners: Footscray TSOB
- Best and fairest: Bernard Tierny (Whitefriars)
- Leading goalkicker: Terry Wilson (St Andrew's − 127 goals)

Aquinas won their first F Section premiership in their first VAFA season, defeating Whitefriars by one point.

=== Ladder ===
Pos	Team	Pld	W	L	D	PF	PA	PP	Pts	Qualification
1	Aquinas (P)	18	17	1	0	2244	874	256.8	68	Finals series
2	Whitefriars	18	15	3	0	2324	1156	201.0	60	Finals series
3	St Andrew's	18	14	4	0	2471	1522	162.4	56	Finals series
4	Doveton	18	13	5	0	1933	1200	161.0	52	Finals series
5	Williamstown CYMS	18	11	7	0	1689	1620	104.3	44	
6	Old Carey	18	10	8	0	1597	1453	109.9	40	
7	La Trobe University	18	8	10	0	1454	1672	870	32	
8	Commonwealth Bank	18	7	11	0	1463	1858	78.7	28	
9	University Reds	18	6	12	0	1249	1890	66.1	24	
10	St Leonard's	18	3	15	0	1038	2100	49.4	12	
11	ANZ Bank	18	2	16	0	1227	2200	55.8	8	Relegation
12	Footscray TSOB	18	2	16	0	1084	2323	44.7	8	Relegation

Rules for classification: 1) points; 2) percentage; 3) number of points for.
(P) Premiers

=== Finals ===
	Semi-finals
Saturday, 22 August (2:15pm)	St Andrew's 16.13 (109)	def.	Doveton 4.13 (37)	Old Camberwell
Saturday, 22 August (2:15pm)	Aquinas 14.10 (94)	def. by	Whitefriars 20.22 (142)	Harry Trott Oval, Albert Park

	Preliminary final
Saturday, 29 August (2:15pm)	St Andrew's 15.7 (97)	def. by	Aquinas 19.15 (129)	Harry Trott Oval, Albert Park

Grand Final
Saturday, 5 September (2:15pm)	Whitefriars	def. by	Aquinas
2.5 (17); 6.8 (44); 6.9 (45); 12.12 (84)	Q1; Q2; Q3; Final	3.1 (19); 6.4 (40); 8.10 (58); 12.13 (85)	Umpires: Andrew Mullaly, Mark Bushfield
3: Sutton; 2: Barclay, Bonnyman; 1: Tierney, Bunn, McLelland, Reidy, Lee	Goals	4: Ryan; 3: Clarke; 2: Bell, D. Wright; 1: Wilkinson
McLelland, Bunn, Crowe, Coghlan, Borrack, Tierney	Best	Ryan, Phyland, Grierson, Wilkinson, Phelan, Fleiter
Both teams promoted to E Section

== G Section ==
1987 VAFA G Section season
- Premiers: Bloods
- Minor premiers: Bloods
- Wooden spooners: Old Melburnians
- Best and fairest: Gary Sweet (Port Colts)
- Leading goalkicker: Drew Robinson (Bloods − 75 goals)

Bloods, in their first VAFA season, defeated Port Colts by 40 points in the Grand Final. Heavy wind at Elsternwick Park meant no scores were recorded against the wind for the entire match.

=== Ladder ===
Pos	Team	Pld	W	L	D	PF	PA	PP	Pts	Qualification
1	Bloods (P)	16	14	2	0	1349	586	230.2	56	Finals series
2	Monash Whites	16	13	3	0	1120	687	163.0	52	Finals series
3	Port Colts	16	11	5	0	1126	947	118.9	44	Finals series
4	Kew	16	10	5	1	889	739	120.3	42	Finals series
5	De La Salle	16	10	6	0	863	813	106.2	40	
6	St Bernard's	16	7	9	0	684	892	69.8	28	
7	Collegians	16	6	10	0	748	1049	71.3	24	
8	Old Haileybury	16	5	10	1	668	991	67.4	22	
9	Old Scotch	16	5	11	0	949	1153	82.3	20	
10	Marcellin	16	4	12	0	618	1144	54.0	16	
11	GTV 9	16	3	13	0	548	1124	48.8	12	Relegation
12	Old Melburnians	16	3	13	0	450	1102	40.8	12	Relegation

Rules for classification: 1) points; 2) percentage; 3) number of points for.
(P) Premiers

=== Finals ===
Grand Final
Sunday, 23 August	Bloods	def.	Port Colts	Elsternwick Park
5.6 (36); 5.6 (36); 12.8 (80); 12.8 (80)	Q1; Q2; Q3; Final	0.0 (0); 5.0 (30); 5.0 (30); 6.4 (40)
3: D. Robinson; 2: McAsey, Cadman 2, Watkins; 1: Bainbridge, Gardiner, Todd	Goals	2: McNamara; 1: Turner, Davidson, Pasquill, Tinsley
Todd, Bainbridge, Jarick, Legge, Cadman, Johnson	Best	Keltie, Wale, O'Neill, Tinsley, Bailey, Finegan
Both teams promoted to F Section

== H Section ==
1987 VAFA H Section season
- Premiers: Eltham
- Minor premiers: Eltham
- Wooden spooners: Power House/Balaclava
- Best and fairest: Peter Hooper (St Kevin's)
- Leading goalkicker: Sebastian Fitzpatrick (Eltham − 43 goals)

At the end of the season, Old Brighton's H Section side disbanded.

=== Ladder ===
Pos	Team	Pld	W	L	D	PF	PA	PP	Pts	Qualification
1	Eltham (P)	16	14	2	0	1256	471	266.7	56	Finals series
2	Old Brighton	16	13	3	0	1056	376	280.9	52	Finals series
3	St Kevin's	16	13	3	0	986	575	171.5	52	Finals series
4	Bulleen Templestowe	16	12	2	0	1275	419	304.3	48	Finals series
5	Richmond Central	16	9	7	0	785	676	116.7	36	
6	Old Xaverians	16	9	7	0	747	689	108.4	36	
7	State Bank	16	9	7	0	732	886	82.6	36	
8	Old Geelong	16	5	11	0	548	1050	52.2	20	
9	St Kilda	16	4	12	0	679	1171	58.0	16	
10	North Old Boys	16	4	12	0	233	731	31.9	16	
11	Therry	16	2	13	1	602	942	63.9	10	
12	Power House/Balaclava	16	1	14	1	185	1676	11.0	6	

Rules for classification: 1) points; 2) percentage; 3) number of points for.
(P) Premiers

=== Finals ===
Grand Final
Sunday, 23 August	Eltham	def.	Bulleen Templestowe
0.1 (1); 3.6 (24); 3.8 (26); 6.9 (45)	Q1; Q2; Q3; Final	3.4 (22); 4.5 (29); 4.9 (33); 4.9 (33)
Sager, Chesser, Adams, S. Fitzpatrick, Shaw, McPhail	Goals	Pollard, Viney, Goddrn, Stagg,
Baxter, Gardiner, Hall, New, Dawson, Weathertill	Best	Murphy, Sheridan, Skurnik, Stagg, Chaplin
Both teams promoted to G Section
