= 2017 VAFA season =

117th season of the Victorian Amateur Football Association

- Date: 13 April – 24 September 2017
- Teams: 69
- Matches played: 640

The 2017 VAFA season was the 117th season of the Victorian Amateur Football Association (VAFA), the largest senior community Australian rules football competition in Victoria. The season began on 13 April and concluded on 24 September, with 69 teams participating across seven divisions under a promotion and relegation system.

In addition to the men's competition, the newly-formed VAFA Women's (VAFAW) competition held its inaugural season in 2017.

== Background ==
Accounting firm William Buck signed a three-year sponsorship deal extension with the VAFA, which included continuing the naming rights for the "William Buck Premier Division".

=== 125-year anniversary ===
2017 marked 125 years since the VAFA was founded in 1892 as the Metropolitan Junior Football Association (MJFA). The competition released a commemorative logo for the anniversary. It was also the 125th year for the Collegians Football Club, the only club from the first MJFA season to still exist and compete in the competition.

In round 11, the VAFA held "Clubs Round", which recognised volunteers who had contributed to the success of their clubs over the past 25 years with specialised medallions.

== Association membership ==
In late 2016, the Monash Gryphons merged with Glen Eira to form the Glen Eira Gryphons. The clubs had initially planned to amalgamate for the 2016 season, but ultimately remained separate entities.

The Chadstone Football Club left Division 4 and returned to the Club XVIII competition for 2017 after failing to win any senior matches during the 2016 season. Shortly before the start of the 2017 season, Box Hill North also withdrew from Division 4 as it was unable to field a seniors or reserves team.

Yarra Valley Old Boys was renamed to Yarra Old Grammarians to reflect its ties with Yarra Valley Grammar.

== Premier ==
2017 VAFA Premier season
- Date: 13 April − 24 September 2019
- Teams: 10
- Premiers: St Kevin's; 1st Premier premiership
- Minor premiers: St Kevin's
- JN Woodrow Medal: Bede Mahon (University Blacks − 17 votes)
- Leading goalkicker: Tim Geappen (University Blues − 44 goals); Matthew Handley (Old Xaverians − 44 goals)
- Matches played: 94

St Kevin's won the Premier Division premiership for the first time, defeating Collegians by three points in the grand final.

=== Ladder ===
In round 1, the match between Beaumaris and Old Melburnians was abandoned due to lightning with 16 minutes remaining in the fourth quarter. In round 9, Old Xaverians defender Jarryd Skene suffered a severe leg break in the match against Collegians, with the match abandoned 59 minutes into the fourth quarter after a lengthy delay. In both cases, the VAFA split the premiership points and the final scores stood for percentage purposes.

Pos	Team	Pld	W	L	D	PF	PA	PP	Pts	Qualification
1	St Kevin's (P)	18	16	2	0	1896	1152	164.6	64	Finals series
2	University Blues	18	13	4	1	1562	1212	128.9	54	Finals series
3	Collegians	18	12	4	2	1511	1249	121.0	52	Finals series
4	De La Salle	18	11	7	0	1367	1311	104.3	44	Finals series
5	Old Xaverians	18	9	8	1	1428	1379	103.6	38	
6	Old Melburnians	18	8	9	1	1389	1359	102.2	34	
7	Old Trinity	18	6	12	0	1257	1443	87.1	24	
8	St Bedes/Mentone Tigers	18	4	13	1	1174	1702	69.0	18	
9	University Blacks	18	4	14	0	1402	1624	86.3	16	Relegation
10	Beaumaris	18	3	13	2	1214	1769	68.6	16	Relegation

Rules for classification: 1) points; 2) percentage; 3) number of points for.
(P) Premiers

=== Finals ===
2017 VAFA Premier Grand Final
Sunday, 24 September (2:30pm)	St Kevin's	def.	Collegians	Trevor Barker Oval
1.2 (8); 6.3 (39); 10.4 (64); 10.10 (70)	Q1; Q2; Q3; Final	2.5 (17); 5.6 (36); 6.11 (47); 9.13 (67)
M. Brown 2, B. Kanakis 2, J. Wallis 2, C. Matheson, B. Dowd, H. Parkes, J. Strauss	Goals	K. Ong 2, A. Croft 2, V. Michie, F. Cameron, C. Hylton, J. Trotter, W. Johnson
M. Brown, S. Critchley, C. Matheson, B. Kanakis, C. Ross, J. Wallis	Best	T. Penberthy, S. Hibbins, M. Jenkinson, N. Dixon, K. Ong, A. Fahie

== Premier B ==
2017 VAFA Premier B season
- Date: 13 April − 23 September 2019
- Teams: 10
- Premiers: Old Brighton; 3rd Premier B premiership
- Minor premiers: Old Brighton
- GT Moore Medal: Harry Hill (Old Brighton − 25 votes)
- Leading goalkicker: Jake Lew (AJAX − 46 goals)
- Matches played: 94

=== Ladder ===
Pos	Team	Pld	W	L	D	PF	PA	PP	Pts	Qualification
1	Old Brighton (P)	18	16	1	1	1748	898	194.7	66	Finals series
2	Old Scotch	18	15	2	1	1885	1082	174.2	62	Finals series
3	St Bernard's	18	12	6	0	1748	1266	138.1	48	Finals series
4	Monash Blues	18	10	8	0	1374	1213	113.3	40	Finals series
5	AJAX	18	9	9	0	1335	1299	102.8	36	
6	Mazenod	18	8	10	0	1085	1554	69.8	32	
7	Old Carey	18	6	12	0	1359	1461	93.0	24	
8	Parkdale Vultures	18	5	13	0	1201	1612	74.5	20	
9	Fitzroy	18	5	13	0	1111	1625	68.4	20	Relegation
10	Peninsula Old Boys	18	3	15	0	1020	1856	55.0	12	Relegation

Rules for classification: 1) points; 2) percentage; 3) number of points for.
(P) Premiers

=== Finals ===
2017 VAFA Premier B Grand Final
Saturday, 23 September (2:30pm)	Old Brighton	def.	Old Scotch	Trevor Barker Oval
2.9 (21); 6.12 (48); 7.12 (54); 11.13 (79)	Q1; Q2; Q3; Final	2.2 (14); 4.6 (30); 5.6 (36); 6.7 (43)
H. Hill 3, M. Karayannis 2, P. Liston, B. Rawlinson, A. Zimmerman, B. Jakobi, D. Anthony, L. Healy	Goals	J. Halsall 2, J. Sansom, J. Clarke, H. Larwill, N. Cox
D. Verney, H. Hill, B. Jarick, B. Jakobi, T. Fisher, A. Dewar	Best	G. Van den Broek , T. McKinley, J. Bull, A. Van Ryn, M. Seed, D. Gilbert

== Premier C ==
2017 VAFA Premier C season
- Date: 13 April − 23 September 2019
- Teams: 10
- Premiers: Old Haileybury; 3rd Premier C premiership
- Minor premiers: Old Haileybury
- L Zachariah Medal: Ben Hart (Old Camberwell − 15 votes)
- Leading goalkicker: Declan Reilly (Caulfield Grammarians − 53 goals); Nathan Waite (Old Haileybury − 53 goals)
- Matches played: 94

=== Ladder ===
Pos	Team	Pld	W	L	D	PF	PA	PP	Pts	Qualification
1	Caulfield Grammarians	18	16	2	0	1918	1146	167.4	64	Finals series
2	Old Haileybury (P)	18	11	7	0	1682	1241	135.5	44	Finals series
3	Marcellin	18	11	7	0	1791	1349	132.8	44	Finals series
4	Williamstown CYMS	18	9	9	0	1780	1520	117.1	36	Finals series
5	Old Geelong	18	9	9	0	1460	1365	107.0	36	
6	Old Mentonians	18	9	9	0	1538	1639	93.8	36	
7	Old Camberwell	18	8	10	0	1374	1663	82.6	32	
8	Old Ivanhoe	18	8	10	0	1261	1533	82.3	32	
9	Hampton Rovers	18	6	12	0	1134	1586	71.5	24	Relegation
10	Kew	18	3	15	0	1060	1956	54.2	12	Relegation

Rules for classification: 1) points; 2) percentage; 3) number of points for.
(P) Premiers

=== Finals ===
2017 VAFA Premier C Grand Final
Saturday, 23 September (2:30pm)	Old Haileybury	def.	Caulfield Grammarians	Casey Fields
3.4 (22); 6.6 (42); 10.8 (68); 14.10 (94)	Q1; Q2; Q3; Final	2.1 (13); 3.4 (22); 4.8 (32); 6.10 (46)	Best on ground: Peter Shakallis (Old Haileybury)
C. Rich 3, N. Gooda 2, C. Connelly 2, A. Woltering, B. White, N. Waite, S. Ellis, J. Nicolopoulos, E. Limon, J. Munro	Goals	N. Baltas 3, D. Reilly 2, T. Nixon
P. Shakallis, J. Paul, A. Toy, N. Gooda, J. Arthur, L. Treverton	Best	J. Woodman, N. Baltas, J. Stewart, T. Nixon, N. Fallu, J. Presnell

== Division 1 ==
2017 VAFA Division 1 season
- Date: 13 April − 16 September 2019
- Teams: 10
- Premiers: PEGS; 1st Division 1 premiership
- Minor premiers: St Mary's Salesian
- LS Pepper Medal: Dean Calcedo (Preston Bullants − 17 votes)
- Leading goalkicker: Michael Dolan (St Mary's Salesian − 72 goals)
- Matches played: 94

PEGS won the Division 1 premiership for the first time, defeating minor premiers St Mary's Salesian by 13 points in the grand final. St Mary's led by 57 points at the 18th minute mark of the second quarter, but PEGS came back in a 70-point turnaround.

=== Ladder ===
Pos	Team	Pld	W	L	D	PF	PA	PP	Pts	Qualification
1	St Mary's Salesian	18	15	3	0	1926	1295	148.7	60	Finals series
2	Ormond	18	14	4	0	1901	1288	147.6	56	Finals series
3	PEGS (P)	18	14	4	0	1797	1248	144.0	56	Finals series
4	Oakleigh	18	12	6	0	1829	1487	123.0	48	Finals series
5	Preston Bullants	18	11	7	0	1513	1388	109.0	44	
6	Therry Penola	18	8	10	0	1566	1701	92.1	32	
7	Ivanhoe	18	6	12	0	1509	1783	84.6	24	
8	Brunswick NOBSPC	18	5	13	0	1317	1774	74.2	20	
9	St John's	18	3	15	0	1276	2005	63.6	12	Relegation
10	Whitefriars	18	2	16	0	1302	1967	66.2	8	Relegation

Rules for classification: 1) points; 2) percentage; 3) number of points for.
(P) Premiers

=== Finals ===
2017 VAFA Division 1 Grand Final
Saturday, 16 September (2:20pm)	St Mary's Salesian	def. by	PEGS	Box Hill City Oval
8.2 (50); 11.4 (70); 14.6 (90); 14.7 (91)	Q1; Q2; Q3; Final	0.1 (1); 5.5 (35); 12.7 (79); 15.14 (104)	JW Manton Medal: Robert Baddeley (PEGS)
L. Dykes 4, M. Dolan 4, D. Ryan 2, S. Jones, C. Angley, D. Grant, B. Andrews	Goals	T. Skurrie 3, A. Romanyk 2, J. Young 2, H. Schiavello 2, T. Black 2, M. Wilson, J. Rogers, D. Cerantonio, B. Jones
T. Dudgeon, J. Perriam, C. Angley, J. Elliston, J. Kenyon, L. Dykes	Best	R. Baddeley, D. Ryan, A. Khallouf, B. Jones, B. Hannah, S. Whillas

== Division 2 ==
2017 VAFA Division 2 season
- Date: 13 April − 17 September 2019
- Teams: 10
- Premiers: Prahran Assumption; 1st Division 2 premiership
- Minor premiers: Prahran Assumption
- J Fullerton Medal: James Musster (Prahran Assumption − 33 votes)
- Leading goalkicker: Kristian Cherbakof (Bulleen Templestowe − 49 goals)
- Matches played: 94

=== Ladder ===
Pos	Team	Pld	W	L	D	PF	PA	PP	Pts	Qualification
1	Prahran Assumption (P)	18	16	2	0	2001	951	210.4	64	Finals series
2	West Brunswick	18	14	4	0	1591	1203	132.3	56	Finals series
3	MHSOB	18	11	7	0	1507	1221	123.4	44	Finals series
4	Old Paradians	18	10	8	0	1402	1368	102.5	40	Finals series
5	Yarra Old Grammarians	18	9	9	0	1476	1487	99.3	36	
6	Emmaus St Leo's	18	9	9	0	1450	1594	91.0	36	
7	Bulleen Templestowe	18	7	11	0	1449	1488	97.4	28	
8	Old Eltham Collegians	18	7	11	0	1327	1390	95.5	28	
9	Glen Eira	18	7	11	0	1414	1560	90.6	28	Relegation
10	Hawthorn	18	0	18	0	1023	2378	43.0	0	Relegation

Rules for classification: 1) points; 2) percentage; 3) number of points for.
(P) Premiers

=== Finals ===
2017 VAFA Division 2 Grand Final
Sunday, 17 September (2:10pm)	Prahran Assumption	def.	West Brunswick	Elsternwick Park
6.4 (40); 6.6 (42); 9.9 (63); 10.11 (71)	Q1; Q2; Q3; Final	0.1 (1); 1.3 (9); 1.6 (12); 6.10 (46)
E. Kuret 2, T. Maya 2, J. Hogarth, G. Hogarth, B. Dickinson, A. Steinberg, T. Quinn, J. Simonetta	Goals	J. Iacono, S. Fleming, M. Booth, D. Muscat, B. Irving, D. Ferrier
E. Kuret, T. Freeman, J. Musster, L. Kerr, D. Freeman, J. Stocker	Best	C. Mitchell, E. Lloyd, A. Schipp, T. Stokes, D. Sinnott, B. Simpson

== Division 3 ==
2017 VAFA Division 3 season
- Date: 13 April − 16 September 2019
- Teams: 10
- Premiers: UHS-VU; 1st Division 3 premiership
- Minor premiers: Power House
- Hutchinson Medal: Chris Hudson (Westbourne Grammarians − 22 votes)
- Leading goalkicker: Jake Munro (Richmond Central − 73 goals)
- Matches played: 94

This was Point Cook's final season in the VAFA, with the club moving to the Western Region Football League (WRFL) for the 2018 season.

=== Ladder ===
Pos	Team	Pld	W	L	D	PF	PA	PP	Pts	Qualification
1	Power House	18	16	2	0	1870	1341	139.5	64	Finals series
2	UHS-VU (P)	18	15	3	0	1871	1062	176.2	60	Finals series
3	Swinburne University	18	11	7	0	1734	1408	123.2	44	Finals series
4	Westbourne Grammarians	18	11	7	0	1595	1354	117.8	44	Finals series
5	Canterbury	18	10	8	0	1674	1396	119.9	40	
6	La Trobe University	18	8	10	0	1480	1427	103.7	32	
7	Richmond Central	18	8	10	0	1533	1487	103.1	32	
8	Point Cook	18	7	11	0	1312	1622	81.4	28	
9	Albert Park	18	4	14	0	1357	1802	75.3	16	Relegation
10	South Melbourne Districts	18	0	18	0	820	2356	34.8	0	Relegation

Rules for classification: 1) points; 2) percentage; 3) number of points for.
(P) Premiers

=== Finals ===
2017 VAFA Division 3 Grand Final
Saturday, 16 September (2:20pm)	UHS-VU	def.	Power House	Elsternwick Park
5.2 (32); 7.5 (47); 11.11 (77); 13.14 (92)	Q1; Q2; Q3; Final	0.5 (5); 4.10 (34); 5.12 (42); 9.17 (71)	VB Zanin Medal: Brandon Jackson (UHS-VU)
B. Jackson 4, M. Sweeney 3, S. McSweeney 2, C. Mccutcheon 2, E. Ramsay, M. Legudi	Goals	N. Nagel 3, P. Healey 3, R. Yak, A. Collett, D. Mitchell
B. Jackson, J. McGee, M. Legudi, J. Turner, S. McSweeney, B. Anderson	Best	T. Sardone, G. Bell, P. Healey, A. Reynolds, B. Circosta, A. Collett

== Division 4 ==
2017 VAFA Division 4 season
- Date: 13 April − 16 September 2019
- Teams: 10
- Premiers: Aquinas; 1st Division 4 premiership
- Minor premiers: Aquinas
- OJ Meehan Medal: Adam Baltruweit (Manningham Cobras − 18 votes)
- Leading goalkicker: Jake George (North Brunswick − 65 goals)
- Matches played: 94

=== Ladder ===
Pos	Team	Pld	W	L	D	PF	PA	PP	Pts	Qualification
1	Aquinas (P)	16	14	2	0	2065	750	275.3	56	Finals series
2	North Brunswick	16	14	2	0	1716	859	199.8	56	Finals series
3	Manningham Cobras	16	13	3	0	1652	971	170.1	52	Finals series
4	Mt Lilydale	16	7	8	1	1160	1443	80.4	30	Finals series
5	Elsternwick	16	7	9	0	1349	1427	94.5	28	
6	Eley Park	16	7	9	0	1384	1588	87.2	28	
7	Parkside	16	7	11	0	957	1491	64.2	20	
8	Masala	16	2	13	1	1016	1819	55.9	10	
9	St Francis Xavier	16	2	14	0	991	1871	53.0	8	

Rules for classification: 1) points; 2) percentage; 3) number of points for.
(P) Premiers

=== Finals ===
2017 VAFA Division 4 Grand Final
Saturday, 16 September (2:20pm)	Aquinas	def.	Manningham Cobras	Garvey Oval
2.3 (15); 6.7 (43); 9.9 (63); 14.10 (94)	Q1; Q2; Q3; Final	2.1 (13); 6.5 (41); 8.8 (56); 10.9 (69)	AK White Medal: Nick Morrison-Storey (Aquinas)
S. Williams 5, P. Mahon 2, J. Butcher 2, A. Naulty, N. Morrison-Storey, S. Ragozzini, P. Jurkovsky, J. Perrett	Goals	M. Parkes 2, M. Muller 2, K. Maghamez 2, A. Sukkel, A. Baltruweit, C. Jolly, J. Stephens
N. Morrison-Storey, A. Naulty, M. O'Malley, J. Fisher, S. Ragozzini, A. Guthrie	Best	M. Parkes, M. Muller, K. Maghamez, A. Baltruweit

== See also ==
- 2017 VAFA Women's season
