= Chadstone Football Club =

Australian rules football club

Names
- Full name: Chadstone Amateur Football Club
- Former name: Syndal Tally-Ho Football Club Inc
- Nickname(s): Synners, Demons
- Motto: #ChaddyLifeChaddyLove

2024 season
- Home-and-away season: 11th
- Leading goalkicker: Alex Moody

Club details
- Founded: 1966; 60 years ago
- Competition: Victorian Amateur Football Association
- President: James Veal
- Coach: Jordan King (Seniors) Nathan Gard (Reserves)
- Captain: Sam Oxley (Seniors) Ben Dennison (Seniors) Wes Mendes (Reserves)
- Premierships: VAFA (1): 2001; SFL (1): 1994
- Ground: Jordan Reserve

Other information
- Official website: chadstone-football-club.square.site

The Chadstone Football Club, nicknamed the Synners, is an Australian rules football club based in the Melbourne suburb of Chadstone. The club was formed in 1983 as Syndal Tally-Ho and plays its home games at Jordan Reserve.

In 2026, Chadstone will compete in the Victorian Amateur Football Association (VAFA) Thirds competition. The club does not have a women's team, although it has publicly expressed interest in entering the VAFA Women's (VAFAW) at some point.

== History ==
The Syndal Tally-Ho Football Club was formed in 1983 after a merger between the Syndal Football Club (known as Syndal Baptist until 1976) and the Tally-Ho Football Club, which had both been competing in the East Suburban Churches Football Association (ESCFA).

In its first season, the merged club made the ESCFA A Grade grand final, but was defeated by Burwood United. The following year, the club won the 1984 A Grade grand final with a 52-point victory over St Mary's Church of England. A second premiership came in 1987. In 1993, the ECSFA was absorbed by the Southern Football League (SFL), and Syndal Tally-Ho won the SFL's Division 3 premiership in 1994.

At the conclusion of the 1996 season, Syndal Tally-Ho moved to the Victorian Amateur Football Association (VAFA). The club competed in the Club XVIII competition in 1997, before entering its first VAFA senior team in Division 4 in 1998. Syndal Tally-Ho won its first VAFA premierships in 2001, winning the senior and reserves grand finals in Division 4.

On 27 October 2008, Syndal Tally-Ho announced it would change its name to Chadstone Football Club, with the 2009 season being the first under the new name. The club also introduced a team in the Victorian FIDA Football League, a competition for people with an intellectual disability.

Following the name change, the club struggled significantly on-field. It took four years to win a senior match under the "Chadstone" name, with the drought being broken against Mt Lilydale in round 16 of the 2012 Division 4 season.

In 2017 – after failing to win any senior matches during the 2016 season – Chadstone left Division 4 and returned to the Club XVIII competition.

After seven years in the Club XVIII and Thirds competitions, Chadstone re-entered a senior team in Division 3 for the 2024 VAFA season. In round 1, with 22 club debutants, Chadstone defeated Eley Park by 57 points to claim their first VAFA divisional win in 3,256 days. The club ultimately finished last on the Division 3 ladder in 2024, winning a total of two matches.

Following a ninth-placed finish in 2025, Chadstone elected to return to the Thirds competition for the 2026 season.

== Seasons ==
| Premiers | Grand Finalist | Minor premiers | Finals appearance | Wooden spoon | Division leading goalkicker | Division best and fairest |

=== Seniors ===
| Year | League | Division | Finish | W | L | D | Coach | Captain | Best and fairest | Leading goalkicker | | Ref |
|---|---|---|---|---|---|---|---|---|---|---|---|---|
| 2023 | VAFA | Thirds (D4) | 6th | 6 | 10 | 0 | | | | | | |
| 2024 | VAFA | Division 3 | 11th | 2 | 14 | 0 | | | | Ben Ogilvie | 36 | |
