= FIDA Football League =

- Sport: Australian rules football
- Founded: 1990; 36 years ago
- First season: 1991
- No. of teams: 28
- Country: Australia
- Related competitions: VBFL
- Website: fida.org.au

The FIDA Football League (Football Integration Development Association) is an Australian rules football based in Victoria. The competition provides people with an intellectual disability the chance play football at a competitive level.

The league is mix-gendered and open to people aged 14 and over, with four regional conferences, the largest being in metropolitan Melbourne.

As of 2022, FIDA has 28 clubs and approximately 800 players. The competition is supported by the Hawthorn Football Club, Box Hill Hawks, Coburg Football Club and Williamstown Football Club.

== History ==
=== Origins and formation ===
On 18 June 1989, a football clinic for people with an intellectual disability was run by the Hawthorn Football Club and the Hawthorn City Council. Hawthorn players Peter Curran and Rob Dickson were among those conducting the clinic.

A skills and match day was held a year later on 21 October 1990 following a steering committee, where the "Football Integration Development Association" name was agreed on.

The first FIDA matches were held on 7 March 1991. Six clubs – Chadstone Chargers, Werribee Blues, Mitcham Tigers, Hawthorn, Royal Magpies and Heidelberg – participated in the first round, with Broadmeadows and Keilor Saints joining the competition later in the year.

The 1991 grand final was held at Glenferrie Oval, with Chadstone (who were undefeated for the season) defeating Mitcham 19.14 (128) to 2.5 (17). Former Hawthorn coach John Kennedy Sr, whose son Bernard played for Chadstone, presented the trophy and medallions.

Four new clubs entered the competition in 1992, and it was expanded to a multi-division format with Division 1 and Division 2.

=== VAFA links ===
In 1993, FIDA established relations with the Victorian Amateur Football Association (VAFA), who agreed to house the FIDA co-ordinator at VAFA headquarters at Elsternwick Park. The VAFA agreed to promote FIDA, with the VAFA Umpires Association also supplying umpires to the competition.

The links with the VAFA were formally established in 1995, supporting FIDA to grow further. The same year, Bendigo also entered the competition as its first regional-based club.

=== Recent growth ===
FIDA employed a General Manager in 2009, which saw the competition develop rapidly. By the end of the 2015 season, FIDA had more than 600 players, and the running of the competition was taken over by AFL Victoria.

No season was held in 2020 due to the COVID-19 pandemic, and the 2021 season was curtailed because of COVID-19 restrictions.

== Clubs ==
=== Metropolitan Conference ===
Club	Colours	Nickname	Est.	First season
AJAX		Jackas	1957	2023
Ballarat Bulldogs		Bulldogs	2016	2016
Carrum Downs		Jets	????	????
Coburg		Lions	1891	2017
Cranbourne		Eagles	1889	2021
Eltham		Panthers	1904	20??
Ferntree Gully		Eagles	18??	2012
Fountain Gate Gators		Gators	????	2023
Kananook Bulls		Bulls	????	2017
Lower Plenty		Bears	1962	2016
Mazenod Panthers		Panthers	2005	2005
Monash Demons		Demons	2020	2020
Parkside		Devils		
Ringwood Spiders		Spiders	1992	2021
Sandown Cobras		Cobras	2010	2010
St Albans		Saints	1946	2015
Williamstown		Seagulls	2011	2011
Wyndham Tigers		Tigers	1991	1991

- Monash Demons was known as Mount Waverley Demons in 2020

=== Northern Conference ===
Club	Colours	Nickname	Est.	First season
Benalla		Saints	1871	2024
Echuca Moama		Rockets	2010	2010
GV Stars		Stars	2014	2016
Merriwa		Magpies	1875	2021
North Albury		Hoppers	1943	2023
Wodonga		Bulldogs	1878	2???

=== Central Conference ===
Club	Colours	Nickname	Est.	First season
Bendigo Suns		Suns	2018	2018
Kyneton		Tigers	1868	2021
Rupertswood		Sharks	1999	2021
Sunbury		Lions	?	?

=== Western Conference ===
Club	Colours	Nickname	Est.	First season
Grampian Giants		Giants	2017	2017
South Warrnambool		Hurricanes	2013	2013
Wimmera Whippets		Whippets	2016	2016
Koroit Saints		Saints		2026

- South Warrnambool was known as the Hampden Hurricanes until 2017

=== Former clubs ===
Club	Colours	Nickname	Est.	Seasons	Fate
Bendigo Warriors		Warriors	19??	1995−????	Folded
Broadmeadows			19??	1991−????	Folded
Chadstone Chargers		Chargers	19??	1991−1996	Merged; 1997 with Mitcham Tigers to form Lions
Colac			19??	1999−????	
Footscray Underdogs (Footscray/Sunshine)		Underdogs	19??	1992−????	Folded
Geelong			1997	1998−????	
Geelong Dragons		Dragons	2018	2018−2023	Folded; 2023
Hamilton Boomers		Boomers	2019	2019−2022	Folded; 2022
Hawthorn Centrals		Centrals	19??	1992−????	Folded
Heidelberg		Bomers	19??	1991−????	Folded
Karingal Bulls		Bulls	19??	1992−????	Folded
Keilor Saints		Saints	19??	1991−????	Folded
Lions		Lions	1997	1997−????	Folded
Marlins		Marlins	1996	1996−1997	Folded; 1998
Maribyrnong			19??	199?−????	Folded
Mitcham Tigers		Chargers	19??	1991−1996	Merged; 1997 with Chadstone Chargers to form Lions
North Ballarat			19??	1999−????	
Parkside			19??	199?−????	
Ringwood Blues		Blues	19??	1992−????	Folded
Royal Magpies		Magpies	19??	1991−????	
Keon Park		Tigers	1965	2024-2024	Folded
