= Geoff McNaughton =

Australian rules footballer, born 1916

Personal information
- Full name: Geoff McNaughton
- Born: 17 October 1916
- Died: 16 July 2008 (aged 91)
- Original team: MHSOB

Playing career^{1}
Years	Club	Games (Goals)
1938	Melbourne	2 (0)
- ^{1} Playing statistics correct to the end of 1938.

Geoff McNaughton (17 October 1916 – 16 July 2008) was an Australian rules footballer who played with Melbourne in the Victorian Football League (VFL).
