= Marcellin College =

Marcellin College may refer to:

- Marcellin College, Bulleen, Victoria, Australia
- Marcellin College Randwick, New South Wales, Australia
- Marcellin College, Auckland, New Zealand
