= Aquinas Old Collegians Football Club =

Aquinas Old Collegians

Names
- Full name: Aquinas Old Collegians Football Club Inc
- Former name: Aquinas Old Boys Football Club (1981−1986)
- Nickname(s): Bloods, Blooders

Club details
- Founded: 18 February 1981; 45 years ago
- Colours: Red Black Green
- Competition: VAFA: Senior men's VAFAW: Senior women's
- Premierships: VAFA (4): 1987; 1996; 2017; 2019; ESCFA (2): 1983; 1984

Other information
- Official website: aquinas.com.au

The Aquinas Old Collegians Football Club, nicknamed the Bloods and also known simply as Aquinas, is an Australian rules football club based in the Melbourne suburb of Ringwood.

As of 2024, the club's men's team competes in Division 2 of the Victorian Amateur Football Association (VAFA), while the women's team is in Premier B of the VAFA Women's (VAFAW) competition.

== History ==
In 1980, discussions were held between former students of Aquinas College about forming a football club. At a meeting at the Ringwood Parish Hall on 18 February 1981, the club was formally established as the "Aquinas Old Boys Football Club", entering E Grade in the Eastern Suburbs Churches Football Association (ESCFA).

In its second year, the club made the E Grade senior and reserves premiership, winning the latter. Back-to-back senior and reserves premierships came in 1983 and 1984.

Aquinas moved to the Victorian Amateur Football Association (VAFA) at the start of the 1987 season, entering F Section. The club, now renamed to "Aquinas Old Collegians", finished first on the ladder with just one loss for the season, and won the grand final by 1 point over Whitefriars.

The club won its second senior premiership in E Section (East) in 1996, defeating Yarra Valley Old Boys by 37 points. A third senior premiership came 21 years later in Division 4 in 2017 with a grand final win over Manningham Cobras, which was followed by a 2-point victory − also against Manningham − in the 2019 Division 3 grand final.

== Seasons ==
=== Grand finals ===
Premiers	Runners-up	Drawn

Year	League	Division	Grade	Opponent	Score	Venue	Crowd	Date	Report
1982	ESCFA	E Grade	Seniors	St Patrick's Mentone	16.7 (103) d. 10.8 (68)				
1982	ESCFA	E Grade	Reserves	Springvale Districts	14.8 (92) d. 12.16 (88)				
1983	ESCFA	D Grade	Seniors	St Patrick's Mentone	16.11 (107) 7.5 (47)				
1983	ESCFA	D Grade	Reserves	Black Rock	11.14 (80) d. 4.6 (30)				
1984	ESCFA	C Grade	Seniors	St Paul's Bentleigh	15.10 (100) d. 12.10 (82)				
1984	ESCFA	C Grade	Reserves	St Paul's Bentleigh	19.17 (131) d. 12.9 (81)				
1985	ESCFA	B Grade	Reserves	Mazenod Old Collegians	7.11 (53) d. 2.9 (21)				
1986	ESCFA	B Grade	Reserves	St Kevin's Ormond	20.23 (143) 10.8 (68)				
1987	VAFA	F Section	Seniors	Whitefriars	12.13 (85) d. 12.12 (84)				
1996	VAFA	E East	Seniors	Yarra Valley Old Boys	18.9 (117) d. 12.8 (80)				
2017	VAFA	Division 3	Seniors	Manningham Cobras	14.10 (94) d. 10.9 (69)			16 September 2017	
2019	VAFA	Division 3	Seniors	Manningham Cobras	8.14 (62) d. 7.18 (60)			5 September 1987	
