= Canterbury Football Club =

Australian rules football club

Names
- Full name: Canterbury Football Club
- Nickname(s): Cobras

2024 season
- After finals: VAFA: 1st VAFAW: N/A
- Home-and-away season: VAFA: 4th VAFAW: 8th
- Leading goalkicker: VAFA: Jayden Cutts (35); VAFAW: Angela Payne (6)
- Best and fairest: VAFA: Mitch Szabo & Michael Topp; VAFAW: Briana Thompson

Club details
- Founded: 1881; 144 years ago
- Competition: VAFA: Division 3 VAFAW: Division 4
- Coach: VAFA: Steve Brown; VAFAW: James Sabell
- Premierships: VAFA (2): 2015; 2024
- Ground(s): Canterbury Sports Ground

Other information
- Official website: canterburyfootball.club

The Canterbury Football Club, nicknamed the Cobras, is an Australian rules football club based in the Melbourne suburb of Canterbury.

In 2025, the club's men's team will compete in Division 2 of the Victorian Amateur Football Association (VAFA) after winning the 2024 Division 3 Grand Final, while the women's team is currently in Division 4 of the VAFA Women's (VAFAW).

== History ==
=== Early years ===
Canterbury was formed in 1881 and joined the newly-created Reporter District Football Association (RDFA) in 1903. The club's first home ground was located at the back of the Canterbury Hotel, which was between Canterbury railway station and Wattle Valley Road.

The club left the RDFA at the end of the 1904 season after finishing last on the ladder. It's unknown what happened to the club during the next decade, but it re-entered the RDFA in 1915.

Canterbury's first known grand final appearance came in 1919, where they were defeated by Mitcham. Their first premiership came the following year, when they defeated Mitcham by one point in the 1920 RDFA grand final.

In 1925, Canterbury was admitted into the newly-created VFL Sub-Districts competition.

=== ESFL and SESFL/SFL ===
After struggling against the Sub-Districts' strongest clubs, Canterbury left to be part of the formation of the Eastern Suburban Football League (ESFL) in 1932. The club made the inaugural ESFL grand final, but was defeated by South Camberwell by four points.

The ESFL merged with the Caulfield-Oakleigh District Football League (CODFL) in 1963, and Canterbury entered the newly-formed South East Suburban Football League (SESFL) A Grade.

In 1972, Canterbury: 22.11 - 133 defeated St. Kilda City: 17.13 - 115 in the SESFL grand final and were coached by Les Foote.

In 1975, Canterbury announced it was unable to field team for that year's SESFL season. It was proposed that the Cobras would merge with Balwyn, but players were against the idea, and the SESFL ultimately gave Canterbury time to improve their situation by relegating them to Division 2.

Canterbury defeated Highett in the 1991 SESFL Division 2 grand final, before the SESFL became the Southern Football League (SFL) in 1992. Following this, Canterbury began to decline, being relegated back to Division 2 in 1993 and Division 4 in 1995. They lost the 1998 Division 4 grand final but were promoted back to Division 3 in 1999, where they remained until their 2003 premiership victory over Black Rock.

=== EFL and VAFA ===
In 2009, Canterbury entered the Eastern Football League (EFL). However, they struggled in their five seasons in the competition, winning just 18 of their 84 games. After finishing the 2013 season without a single win, Canterbury moved to the Victorian Amateur Football Association (VAFA) in 2014.

The Cobras finished third in their debut VAFA season and won their first VAFA premiership in 2015 after a 15-point victory over Parkside, earning promotion to Division 3.

Canterbury entered a women's team in the VAFA Women's (VAFAW) competition in its inaugural season in 2017. The club finished sixth on the ladder in Division 4 with five wins from its 14 games.

In 2024, the club won its second VAFA senior premiership after defeating St John's by 29 points in the Division 3 grand final. The club expressed interest in entering a team in the VAFA Thirds competition for the 2025 season, but ultimately decided against it.

== Club song ==
The club's song is sung to the tune of Victory March, the same as the song of the Sydney Swans.

Come on the Cobras
Sing one and all
Whether we win or whether we fall
We will keep our team up high
Hang out the colours in the sky
The other teams are not worth a zac
When they meet the red, gold and black
So we’ll keep right in there fighting
Til we get victory!

== VFL/AFL players ==
- Bob Pratt – South Melbourne
- Peter Curran – Hawthorn and Brisbane Bears
- Luke Penny – St Kilda
