= Old Yarra Cobras Football Club =

Old Yarra Cobras

Names
- Full name: Old Yarra Cobras Football Club
- Nickname(s): Cobras

2024 season
- Home-and-away season: VAFA: 10th VAFAW: 8th

Club details
- Founded: 19 September 2022; 3 years ago
- Competition: VAFA: Division 2 VAFAW: Premier
- Coach: VAFA: Nathan Monaco; VAFAW: Michael Wines
- Captain(s): VAFA: Nick Zappala; VAFAW: Hilary Donelan
- Ground(s): Swan St, Southbank

The Old Yarra Cobras Football Club is an Australian rules football club based in the Melbourne suburb of Doncaster. The club was formed in 2022 following a merger of Manningham Cobras and Yarra Old Grammarians.

As of 2025, the club's men's team competes in Division 2 of the Victorian Amateur Football Association (VAFA), while the women's team is in the Premier Division of the VAFA Women's (VAFAW) competition.

== History ==
=== Manningham Cobras ===
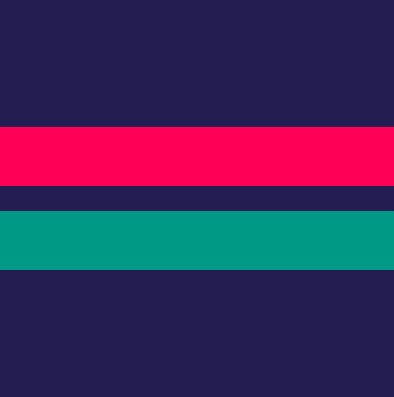
Colours of Maningham Cobras

The Manningham Cobras Amateur Football Club was formed in 1996 as the Bulleen Cobras following a merger of Canterbury North Balwyn United and Bulleen United.

Canterbury North Balwyn United was formed in 1977 following a merger of Canterbury Presbyterian and North Balwyn. The new club joined the Eastern Suburbs Churches Football Association (ESCFA) the same year before later entering the VAFA in 1993.

Bulleen United was formed in 1961 as Bulleen Presbyterian Methodist Football Club, nicknamed the Bulls, and entered the ESCFA. In 1975, the club was renamed to Bulleen United and joined the VAFA. Its first premiership came in 1978, with a victory in the F Section reserves grand final.

In 1996, the two clubs merged and formed the Bulleen Cobras for the 1997 season. The club changed its name to Manningham Cobras in 2009.

=== Yarra Old Grammarians ===
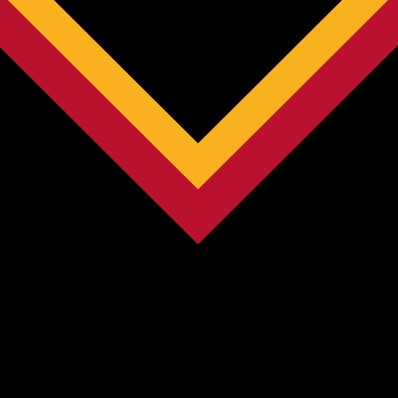
Colours of Yarra Old Grammarians

The Yarra Old Grammarians Football Club, nicknamed the Bushrangers, was founded as the Yarra Valley Old Boys by former students of Yarra Valley Grammar in 1993. The club was admitted to the VAFA the same year, with Wayne Reddaway as senior coach and Jarrod Dickson as captain, joining the newly-formed F2 Grade.

The club was renamed to Yarra Old Grammarians (also known as Old Yarra Grammarians) ahead of the 2017 VAFA season to reflect its ties with Yarra Valley Grammar.

=== Merger and new club ===
Following the conclusion of the 2022 VAFA season, Manningham merged with Yarra Old Grammarians in order to keep both clubs viable on and off-field. On 19 September 2022, the formation of Old Yarra Cobras was announced.

In the club's first season in 2023, it made the Division 2 grand final but was defeated by Parkside by three points. However, the club was still promoted to Division 1 for the 2024 season.

== Seasons ==
Premiers	Grand Finalist	Minor premiers	Finals appearance	Wooden spoon

=== Men's ===
==== Seniors ====
Year	Division	Finish	W	L	D	Coach	Captain	Best and fairest	Leading goalkicker		Ref
2023	Division 2	3rd	12	5	1	Nathan Monaco	Nick Zappala; Tom Bell	Nick Zappala	Jack Hall	38	
2024	Division 1	10th	2	16	0	Nathan Monaco	Nick Zappala		Anthony Raso	29	
2025	Division 2	1st	15	2	1				Jack Hall	61	

=== Women's ===
==== Seniors ====
Year	Division	Finish	W	L	D	Coach	Captain	Best and fairest	Leading goalkicker		Ref
2023	Premier B	2nd	15	2	1	Michael Wines	Hilary Donelan		Iliana Zafiriou	36	
2024	Premier	8th	4	14	0	Michael Wines	Hilary Donelan				
