= St Kevin's Old Boys Football Club =

St Kevin's Old Boys

Names
- Full name: St Kevin's Old Boys Football Club
- Nickname(s): VAFA: SKOB; VAFAW: SKOB, Saints
- Motto: Humilitas et Gratia ("Humility and Grace")

2023 season
- After finals: VAFA: 2nd VAFAW: 2nd
- Home-and-away season: VAFA: 4th VAFAW: 2nd

Club details
- Founded: 1947; 78 years ago
- Colours: Blue; Green; Yellow
- Competition: VAFA: Premier Division; VAFAW: Premier Division
- Premierships: VAFA: Premier (3): 2017; 2018; 2022; Premier B (2): 2004; 2015; Premier C (1): 1994; Division 1 (1): 1952; VAFAW: Premier (3): 2019; 2022; 2023
- Ground(s): T H King Reserve

Other information
- Official website: www.skobfc.com

St Kevin's Old Boys Football Club (SKOB) is an Australian rules football club based in the Melbourne suburb of Glen Iris. The club is linked to St Kevin's College.

As of 2024, SKOB's men's and women's teams both compete in the Premier Division of the Victorian Amateur Football Association (VAFA) and the VAFA Women's (VAFAW) respectively.

== History ==
St Kevin's Old Boys was founded in 1947 and joined the VAFA the same year, along with fellow new clubs Commonwealth Bank and State Electricity Commission. Its first season was in C Section, however the club was relegated to D Section for the 1948 season.

The club won its first premiership in 1952 with a victory in the D Section Grand Final, and returned to C Section in 1953.

SKOB won its first senior Premier Division premiership in 2017, with a three-point victory over Collegians.

In 2018, SKOB went back-to-back, defeating Collegians by 5 points. Four members of the club's premiership side − Lachie Sullivan, Ned Reeves, Tom Jok and Ethan Phillips − have since gone on to play in the Australian Football League (AFL).

SKOB currently fields two women's teams, known as the SKOB Saints, which currently compete in the Premier Division and Division 4 of the VAFAW. The Saints were formed in 2016 and joined Division 3 of the Victorian Women's Football League (VWFL), playing finals in its first season. In 2017, when the VWFL was disbanded, SKOB introduced a second women's team with both joining the newly-formed VAFA Women's.

== Honours ==
=== Men's premierships ===
Division	Level	Wins	Years won
Premier Division (A Section)	Seniors	3	2017, 2018, 2022
Premier Division (A Section)	Thirds	3	2015, 2017 (Gold), 2018 (Gold)
Premier B (B Section)	Seniors	2	2004, 2015
Premier B (B Section)	Reserves	2	2004, 2007
Premier B (B Section)	Thirds	1	2010
Premier C (C Section)	Seniors	1	1994
Premier C (C Section)	Thirds	1	2014
Division 1 (D Section)	Seniors	1	1952
Division 1 (D Section)	Reserves	1	1970
Division 2 (E Section)	Reserves	1	1976

=== Women's premierships ===
Division	Level	Wins	Years won
Premier Division	Seniors	3	2019, 2022, 2023
