= Elsternwick Park =

Sports venue in Brighton, Victoria, Australia

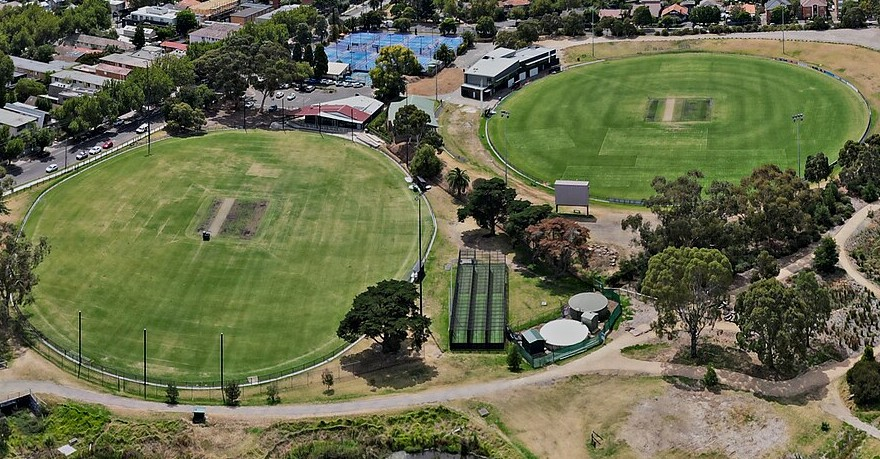
- Holmes-Todd Oval (left) and Oval 1 (right)
- Interactive map of Elsternwick Park
- Former names: Elsternwick Cricket Ground; Sportscover Arena (2002–2018)
- Address: St Kilda St; Brighton, Victoria
- Coordinates: 37°53′5″S 144°59′38″E
- Owner: City of Bayside
- Capacity: 6,000
- Field size: 165m × 145m

Construction
- Opened: 1903; 123 years ago

Tenants
- Elsternwick Cricket Club (VSDCA); Victorian Amateur Football Association (1967–pres); Brighton Football Club (VFA, 1927–1960); Elsternwick Football Club (VAFA, 1908–1953)

Elsternwick Park is a multi-sports complex located in the Melbourne suburb of Brighton. It includes two main ovals (known as Oval 1 and Holmes-Todd Oval) which host Australian rules football and cricket matches. The name also refers to the wider public park in which the ovals are located.

Since 1967, Elsternwick Park has been the administrative and primary central playing base of the Victorian Amateur Football Association (VAFA), hosting top division grand finals. Two VAFA clubs – Old Melburnians and Elsternwick – play their home matches at the venue. Oval 1 has been known under naming rights as Revo Fitness Park since June 2026.

== History ==
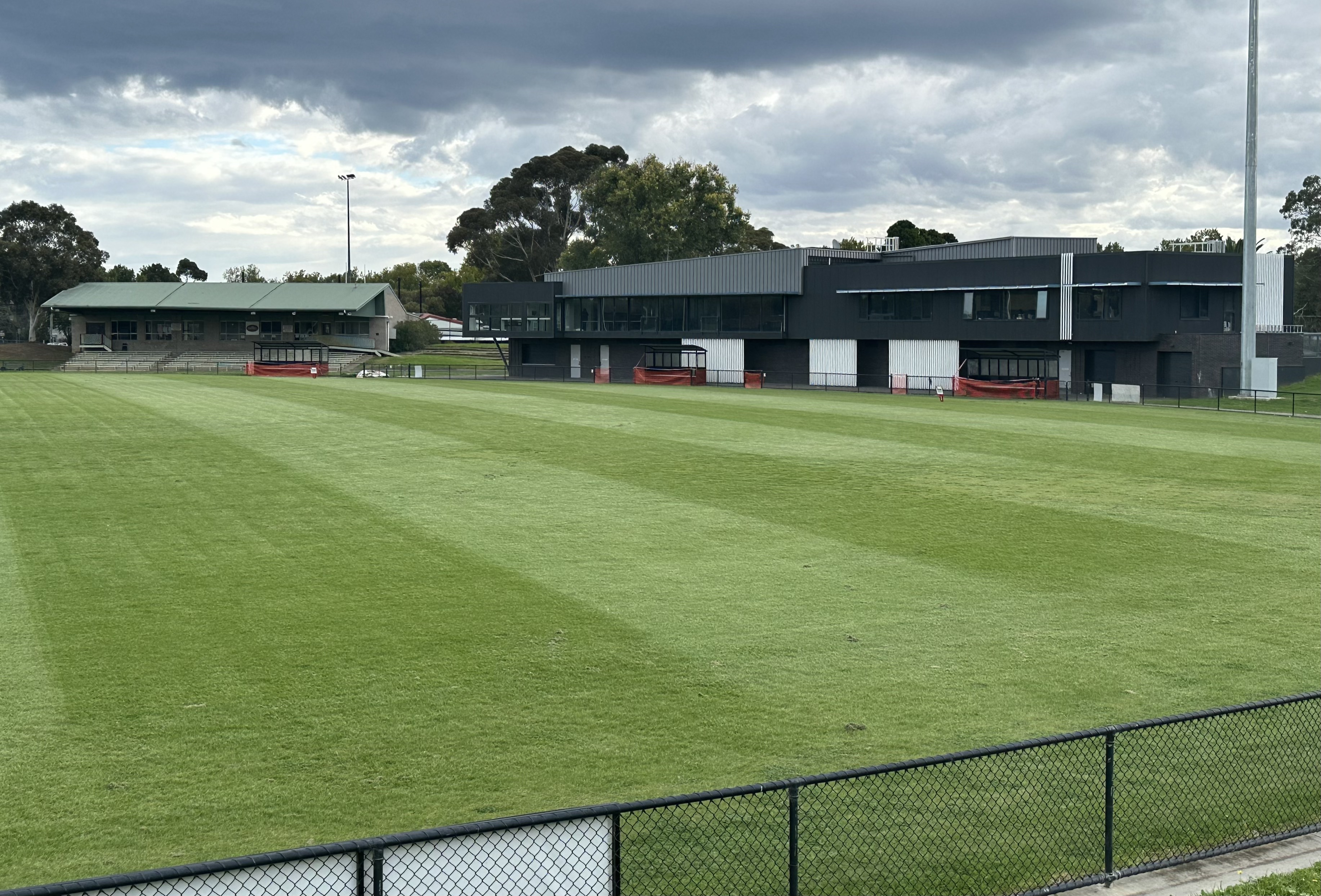
Elsternwick Park Oval 1, 2026

=== Cricket ===
The cricket ground was built on part of the site of the former Elsternwick Racecourse by the Elsternwick Cricket Club, a club which had been established in 1901 through an amalgamation of three local cricket teams. The original cost of the development was more than £500, and the ground was formally opened on 9 November 1903 by premier Sir George Turner. The Elsternwick Football Club, which was playing in the Metropolitan Junior Football Association (later known as the Victorian Amateur Football Association), began playing football on the ground during the winter of 1908.

=== VFA football ===
In 1927, the Brighton Football Club, which was playing in the Victorian Football Association, began playing its senior home matches at the venue. The Brighton Council, which owned the ground, erected fences around the venue, and improvements were paid for jointly by the Elsternwick Cricket Club and the Brighton Football Club. Brighton had an arrangement under which it shared winter tenancy of the ground with the incumbent Elsternwick Football Club, with the clubs using the ground on alternate Saturdays, while the Brighton seconds team continued to use Brighton Beach Oval as its home ground. That arrangement was unique in the VFA, because all other clubs were required to provide the same ground for their firsts and seconds teams to use on alternate weeks.

The ground was of good quality and was sought after by other clubs. On two occasions, the St Kilda Football Club, which played in the Victorian Football League and often endured a disharmonious relationship with its landlord, the St Kilda Cricket Club, considered a move to the ground: once in 1933, when its committee recommended it but the club did not proceed; and again in 1959, when a request to the council for a 50-year lease was rejected. Prahran played its VFA home games at the venue in 1948 when its home ground at Toorak Park was unavailable. In 1954, the Elsternwick Amateur Football Club was evicted from the main ground, and the Brighton Soccer Club leased the ground in its place, sharing it on alternate weekends with the Brighton Football Club; it was the first time a VFA team had shared a ground with a soccer team, which caused great concern within the VFA at the time.

The venue was unavailable for football in 1961 due to re-surfacing works, and upon completion of the works, the Brighton Football Club, which by this time was struggling to survive, was not offered a new lease. Brighton merged with South Caulfield and moved to Princes Park, Caulfield.

=== VASA soccer ===
The Victorian Amateur Soccer Association became the venue's winter tenant, turning the main Elsternwick Park oval into a dedicated soccer venue during winter.

=== VAFA football ===
The Victorian Amateur Football Association has been the main tenant at Elsternwick Park since 1967, and it is now the association's primary home base; it serves as the association's administrative headquarters, the training base of its umpires, and is a venue for finals matches. Since 2003, the venue has had floodlights suitable for night football and has been known as Sportscover Arena as part of Sportscover's sponsorship deal with the VAFA. Sportscover Arena remains the home of the Elsternwick Cricket Club in the Victorian Sub-District Cricket Association. The Elsternwick Football Club, which still plays in the VAFA, now uses the park's No. 2 oval (known since 2019 as the Holmes-Todd Oval), located to the immediate west of the main oval, as its home ground. Since 2009, the Community Cup, an annual charity match played between a team of Melbourne musicians and a team of community radio personalities, has been held at the ground.

== Wider Elsternwick Park ==
The main oval is located in the north-western corner of the wider Elsternwick Park reserve, which covers 90 acres between Glenhuntly Rd, Head St, New St and St Kilda St. The wider reserve served as the Elsternwick Racecourse from 1880 until 1891. After its closure, it fell into disuse and disrepair – to the point that it was known colloquially as "no-man's land" in the district. The main oval was opened on approximately five acres of the reserve in 1903, and the rest of the reserve was leased by the Elsternwick Golf Club in 1910, which invested £13,000 developing it from a swamp to a private golf course. When its lease expired in 1925, the Brighton Council did not renew it and instead made the area a public reserve, which included a municipal nine-hole golf links, a tennis club, a bowls club and more football and cricket ovals, all of which remain today except the golf course, which closed in 2018.

After losing occupancy of Elsternwick Park in 1925, the golf club moved to Cheltenham and became the Kingston Heath Golf Club.
