= Parkside Football Club =

Names
- Full name: Parkside Amateur Football Club
- Nickname: Devils
- Leading goalkicker: Michael Romano (16)
- Best and fairest: Matt Holden

Club details
- Founded: 19 January 1934; 92 years ago
- Colours: Red White
- Competition: VAFA: Division 1 VAFAW: Division 1
- President: Anthony Romano
- Coach: Rick Frost (M) Anthony Romano (W)
- Captain: Michael Romano (M) Hannah Baird (W)
- Premierships: VAFA (6): 1954; 1963; 1972; 1982; 1988; 2023
- Ground: Pitcher Park

Uniforms
Home

The Parkside Football Club, nicknamed the Devils, is an Australian rules football club based in the Melbourne suburb of Alphington.

Parkside is part of the Parkside Sports Club, which also includes the Parkside Junior Football Club and cricket, golf and netball teams.

In 2026, the club's men's team will compete in the Division 1 division of the Victorian Amateur Football Association (VAFA), while its women's team competes in Division 1 of the VAFA Women's (VAFAW). The club also has a team in the Victorian FIDA Football League, a competition for people with intellectual disabilities.

== History ==
Parkside was formed on 19 January 1934 after a meeting at the Alphington Hotel. The club considered joining the VAFA, but found it to be too difficult and instead entered the Victorian Churches Football Association (VCFA). In 1938, the club applied for admission into the VAFA and were accepted.

At the end of the 2002 season, Parkside left the VAFA to join the Diamond Valley Football League (DVFL), which was later renamed to the Northern Football League (NFL).

After 12 years in the NFL, Parkside returned to the VAFA for the 2015 season.
