= 2019 VAFA season =

119th season of the Victorian Amateur Football Association

2022 VAFA season
- Date: 6 April − 22 September 2019
- Teams: 66
- Matches played: 587

The 2019 VAFA season was the 119th season of the Victorian Amateur Football Association (VAFA), the largest senior community Australian rules football competition in Victoria. The season began on 6 April and concluded on 22 September, with 66 teams participating across seven divisions under a promotion and relegation system.

This was the final VAFA season until 2022 where finals series were held and premiers awarded, with the 2020 season cancelled and the 2021 season curtailed due to the impact of the COVID-19 pandemic.

== Background ==
The VAFA announced an agreement with RSN 927 on 5 April 2019, with RSN serving as the official VAFA radio broadcaster.

== Association membership ==
The Old Eltham Collegians Football Club left the VAFA at the end of the 2018 season to join the Northern Football Netball League (NFNL).

=== Name changes ===
Masala renamed to Masala Dandenong Football Club on 11 February 2019 in order to bring it closer to the Dandenong community.

== Premier ==
2019 VAFA Premier season
- Date: 6 April − 22 September 2019
- Teams: 10
- Premiers: University Blues; 4th Premier premiership
- Minor premiers: University Blues
- Wooden spooners: Old Carey
- JN Woodrow Medal: Ayce Cordy (University Blues − 23 votes)
- Leading goalkicker: Jarrad Waite (St Kevin's − 48 goals)
- Matches played: 94

University Blues won the Premier Division premiership for the fourth time, defeating St Kevin's by 40 points in the grand final.

=== Ladder ===
Pos	Team	Pld	W	L	D	PF	PA	PP	Pts	Qualification
1	University Blues (P)	18	14	4	0	1903	1188	160.2	56	Finals series
2	Old Xaverians	18	13	5	0	1738	1207	144.0	52	Finals series
3	Collegians	18	11	6	1	1469	1279	114.9	46	Finals series
4	St Kevin's	18	11	7	0	1702	1255	135.6	44	Finals series
5	Old Brighton	18	10	7	1	1480	1271	116.4	42	
6	Old Melburnians	18	10	8	0	1485	1370	108.4	40	
7	St Bernard's	18	8	10	0	1265	1331	95.0	32	
8	Old Trinity	18	5	11	2	1198	1591	75.3	24	
9	De La Salle	18	5	13	0	1089	1794	60.7	20	Relegation
10	Old Carey	18	1	17	0	954	1997	47.8	4	Relegation

Rules for classification: 1) points; 2) percentage; 3) number of points for.
(P) Premiers

=== Finals ===
2019 VAFA Premier Grand Final
Sunday, 22 September (2:30pm)	University Blues	def.	St Kevin's	Elsternwick Park
5.2 (32); 8.3 (51); 14.7 (91); 18.8 (116)	Q1; Q2; Q3; Final	3.5 (23); 6.7 (43); 6.12 (48); 10.16 (76)	Jock Nelson Medal: Luke Russell (University Blues)
T. Harper 6, J. Taylor 3, K. Harper 2, J. Green 2, T. Batarilo, D. Batarilo, M. Rippon, A. Cordy, R. Young	Goals	J. Waite 2, P. Edgar 2, S. Cameron 2, J. Holden, A. Lynch, B. Kanakis, J. Wood
L. Russell, B. Capra, T. Harper, P. Hayes, P. Flanagan, K. Harper	Best	L. Sullivan, P. Edgar, S. Cameron, B. Lloyd, M. Brown, S. Critchley

== Premier B ==
2019 VAFA Premier B season
- Date: 6 April − 21 September 2019
- Teams: 10
- Premiers: Caulfield Grammarians; 3rd Premier B premiership
- Minor premiers: Caulfield Grammarians
- Wooden spooners: Monash Blues
- GT Moore Medal: Tom Downie (Old Scotch − 27 votes)
- Leading goalkicker: Julian Dobosz (Caulfield Grammarians − 48 goals)
- Matches played: 94

Caulfield Grammarians won the Premier B premiership for the third time, defeating Old Scotch by 92 points in the grand final.

=== Ladder ===
Pos	Team	Pld	W	L	D	PF	PA	PP	Pts	Qualification
1	Caulfield Grammarians (P)	18	16	2	0	2065	930	222.0	64	Finals series
2	Old Scotch	18	16	2	0	1822	1024	177.9	64	Finals series
3	University Blacks	18	14	4	0	1785	965	185.0	56	Finals series
4	Beaumaris	18	9	9	0	1226	1280	95.8	36	Finals series
5	St Bedes/Mentone Tigers	18	9	9	0	1322	1468	90.1	36	
6	Old Haileybury	18	6	12	0	1205	1572	76.7	24	
7	Fitzroy	18	6	12	0	1085	1640	66.2	24	
8	Parkdale Vultures	18	5	13	0	1223	1691	72.3	20	
9	Old Geelong	18	5	13	0	1127	1729	65.2	20	Relegation
10	Monash Blues	18	4	14	0	1062	1623	65.4	16	Relegation

Rules for classification: 1) points; 2) percentage; 3) number of points for.
(P) Premiers

=== Finals ===
2019 VAFA Premier B Grand Final
Saturday, 21 September (2:30pm)	Caulfield Grammarians	def.	Old Scotch	Elsternwick Park
3.8 (26); 9.13 (67); 12.18 (90); 17.22 (124)	Q1; Q2; Q3; Final	1.2 (8); 3.4 (22); 3.6 (24); 4.8 (32)	Ian Cordner Medal: Lachlan Stephens (Caulfield Grammarians)
W. Osborn 3, S. Lachlan 2, B. Goddard 2, J. Dobosz 2, N. Page 2, J. Wallace 2, W. Barker, T. Green, T. Nixon, T. Thompson	Goals	G. Van den Broek 2, T. McKinley 2
J. Webster, S. Lachlan, D. Reilly, J. Wallace, W. Edwards, W. Osborn	Best	C. Cormack, J. Bull, W. Mitchell, G. Van den Broek , N. Jamieson, T. McKinley

== Premier C ==
2019 VAFA Premier C season
- Date: 6 April − 21 September 2019
- Teams: 10
- Premiers: Williamstown CYMS; 1st Premier C premiership
- Minor premiers: Williamstown CYMS
- Wooden spooners: PEGS
- L Zachariah Medal: Yuma Hemphill (Williamstown CYMS − 22 votes)
- Leading goalkicker: Jake Lew (AJAX − 42 goals)
- Matches played: 94

Williamstown CYMS won the Premier C premiership for the first time, defeating Old Scotch by 18 points in the grand final to complete a perfect season.

=== Ladder ===
Pos	Team	Pld	W	L	D	PF	PA	PP	Pts	Qualification
1	Williamstown CYMS (P)	18	18	0	0	2164	935	231.4	72	Finals series
2	Ormond	18	12	6	0	1446	1426	101.4	48	Finals series
3	AJAX	18	11	7	0	1432	1189	120.4	44	Finals series
4	Old Ivanhoe	18	10	7	1	1501	1339	112.1	42	Finals series
5	Mazenod	18	9	9	0	1459	1366	106.8	36	
6	Old Mentonians	18	8	10	0	1377	1394	98.8	32	
7	Marcellin	18	8	10	0	1389	1454	95.5	32	
8	Hampton Rovers	18	6	11	1	1176	1523	77.2	26	
9	Old Camberwell	18	5	13	0	1043	1516	68.8	20	Relegation
10	PEGS	18	2	16	0	1059	1904	55.6	8	Relegation

Rules for classification: 1) points; 2) percentage; 3) number of points for.
(P) Premiers

=== Finals ===
2019 VAFA Premier C Grand Final
Saturday, 21 September (2:30pm)	Williamstown CYMS	def.	AJAX	Trevor Barker Oval
7.2 (44); 10.3 (63); 10.7 (67); 11.12 (78)	Q1; Q2; Q3; Final	3.2 (20); 4.4 (28); 7.6 (48); 9.6 (60)
M. Parkinson 2, J. Gray 2, L. Fairley 2, J. Noonan 2, R. Chan, T. Johnstone, J. Wheelahan	Goals	J. Cohen 3, J. Lew 2, B. Joel 2, T. Sheezel, N. Cohen
D. Jones, B. Tucker, L. Fairley, T. Johnstone, M. Knight, D. Tucker	Best	J. Cohen, B. Shapiro, R. Simon, J. Fisher, D. Janover-Rocha, C. Hamilton

== Division 1 ==
2019 VAFA Division 1 season
- Date: 6 April − 14 September 2019
- Teams: 10
- Premiers: Preston Bullants; 1st Division 1 premiership
- Minor premiers: Preston Bullants
- Wooden spooners: Old Paradians
- LS Pepper Medal: Sean Calcedo (Preston Bullants − 21 votes)
- Leading goalkicker: Aaron Cloke (Oakleigh − 88 goals)
- Matches played: 93

Preston Bullants won the Division 1 premiership for the first time, defeating UHS-VU by 10 points in the grand final.

The round 11 match between Kew and the Preston Bullants was abandoned because of weather conditions, with both clubs awarded two premiership points.

=== Ladder ===
Pos	Team	Pld	W	L	D	PF	PA	PP	Pts	Qualification
1	Preston Bullants (P)	17	13	4	1	1617	1158	139.6	54	Finals series
2	UHS-VU	18	13	5	0	1685	1222	137.9	52	Finals series
3	Kew	17	12	5	1	1525	1019	149.7	50	Finals series
4	Peninsula Old Boys	18	11	7	0	1723	1343	128.4	44	Finals series
5	Oakleigh	18	11	7	0	1653	1317	125.5	44	
6	Therry Penola	18	11	7	0	1494	1315	113.6	44	
7	St Mary's Salesian	18	8	10	0	1596	1661	96.1	32	
8	Prahran Assumption	18	5	13	0	1276	1488	85.8	20	
9	West Brunswick	18	3	15	0	1140	1884	60.5	12	Relegation
10	Old Paradians	18	2	16	0	869	2171	40.0	8	Relegation

Rules for classification: 1) points; 2) percentage; 3) number of points for.
(P) Premiers

=== Finals ===
2019 VAFA Division 1 Grand Final
Saturday, 14 September (2:30pm)	Preston Bullants	def.	UHS-VU	Box Hill City Oval
2.5 (17); 5.7 (37); 6.9 (45); 8.10 (58)	Q1; Q2; Q3; Final	1.2 (8); 1.4 (10); 3.8 (26); 6.12 (48)
L. Sutton 3, T. Hill 2, G. Sutton, J. King, S. Calcedo	Goals	N. Wallace 2, B. Dimattina, N. Devereux, L. Czajko, B. Jackson
S. Calcedo, T. Hill, L. Sutton, G. Sutton, A. Ricco, D. Calcedo	Best	I. Brambley, B. Anderson, C. Jackson, L. Czajko, S. Horton, B. Dimattina

== Division 2 ==
2019 VAFA Division 2 season
- Date: 6 April − 15 September 2019
- Teams: 9
- Premiers: Whitefriars; 2nd Division 1 premiership
- Minor premiers: Whitefriars
- Wooden spooners: Hawthorn
- J Fullerton Medal: Kristian Height (Whitefriars − 23 votes)
- Leading goalkicker: Julius Waras Carstensen (Glen Eira − 52 goals)
- Matches played: 76

Whitefriars won the Division 2 premiership for the second time, defeating Brunswick by 25 points in the grand final to complete a perfect season.

=== Ladder ===
Pos	Team	Pld	W	L	D	PF	PA	PP	Pts	Qualification
1	Whitefriars (P)	16	16	0	0	2059	719	286.4	64	Finals series
2	Brunswick	16	13	3	0	1708	1008	169.4	52	Finals series
3	Glen Eira	16	11	5	0	1533	1208	126.9	44	Finals series
4	MHSOB	16	8	8	0	1275	1193	106.9	32	Finals series
5	Yarra Old Grammarians	16	8	8	0	1412	1396	101.2	32	
6	Bulleen Templestowe	16	8	8	0	1380	1487	92.8	32	
7	Ivanhoe	16	5	11	0	1019	1436	71.0	20	
8	Power House	16	2	14	0	1019	1922	53.0	8	
9	Hawthorn	16	1	15	0	978	2014	48.6	4	Relegation

Rules for classification: 1) points; 2) percentage; 3) number of points for.
(P) Premiers

=== Finals ===
2019 VAFA Division 2 Grand Final
Sunday, 15 September (2:30pm)	Whitefriars	def.	Brunswick	Box Hill City Oval
3.6 (24); 4.6 (30); 8.9 (57); 10.14 (74)	Q1; Q2; Q3; Final	2.0 (12); 5.4 (34); 5.5 (35); 7.7 (49)	AR Fellows Medal: Toby McGurgan (Whitefriars)
M. Stafford 3, C. Hickey 2, J. Connellan 2, D. Wood, A. Hands, M. Nitas	Goals	J. Schmidt 2, J. Adkins 2, C. Gavaghan, J. Perez, N. Burgin
T. McGurgan, M. Stafford, H. Murray, K. Height, A. Marcello, M. Ravenarki	Best	P. O'Donoghue, N. Burgin, D. King, L. Whelan, J. Perez, M. Brown

== Division 3 ==
2019 VAFA Division 3 season
- Date: 6 April − 15 September 2019
- Teams: 8
- Premiers: Aquinas; 2nd Division 3 premiership
- Minor premiers: Manningham Cobras
- Wooden spooners: North Brunswick
- Hutchinson Medal: Tom Bell (Manningham Cobras − 21 votes); Pat O'Brien (Westbourne Grammarians − 21 votes)
- Leading goalkicker: Kane Maghamez (Manningham Cobras − 44 goals)
- Matches played: 60

Aquinas won the Division 3 premiership for the second time, defeating minor premiers Manningham Cobras by two points in the grand final.

=== Ladder ===
Pos	Team	Pld	W	L	D	PF	PA	PP	Pts	Qualification
1	Manningham Cobras	14	13	1	0	1509	861	175.3	52	Finals series
2	Aquinas (P)	14	11	3	0	1349	855	157.8	44	Finals series
3	Emmaus St Leo's	14	8	6	0	1287	1066	120.7	32	Finals series
4	Canterbury	14	8	6	0	1095	1124	97.4	32	Finals series
5	Westbourne Grammarians	14	7	7	0	1002	1131	88.6	28	
6	Richmond Central	14	5	9	0	920	1231	74.7	20	
7	Parkside	14	3	11	0	757	1138	66.5	12	
8	North Brunswick	14	1	13	0	849	1362	62.3	4	Relegation

Rules for classification: 1) points; 2) percentage; 3) number of points for.
(P) Premiers

=== Finals ===
2019 VAFA Division 3 Grand Final
Sunday, 15 September (2:30pm)	Aquinas	def.	Manningham Cobras	Garvey Oval
2.3 (15); 3.7 (25); 6.11 (47); 8.14 (62)	Q1; Q2; Q3; Final	3.3 (21); 5.5 (35); 6.14 (50); 7.18 (60)	Best on ground: Lachlan Barnes
M. Cardamone 2, A. Naulty 2, J. Robertson, M. Allwood, B. O'Loughlin, A. Mattioli	Goals	A. Sukkel 2, A. Raso 2, J. Cawsey, A. Kinniburgh, R. Saunders
L. Barnes, R. Fisher, J. Morrison-Story, M. O'Malley, B. Burke, J. Fisher	Best	N. Zappala, L. Morris, A. Bodin, T. Bell, M. Parkes, A. Baltruweit

== Division 4 ==
2019 VAFA Division 4 season
- Date: 6 April − 15 September 2019
- Teams: 9
- Premiers: St Francis Xavier; 2nd Division 4 premiership
- Minor premiers: St Francis Xavier
- Wooden spooners: Box Hill North
- OJ Meehan Medal: Daniel Chin (St Francis Xavier − 24 votes)
- Leading goalkicker: Harrison Coe (St Francis Xavier − 105 goals)
- Matches played: 76

St Francis Xavier won the Division 4 premiership for the second time, defeating Albert Park by 38 points in the grand final.

Following the conclusion of the season, both St Francis Xavier and South Mornington left the VAFA to join the Southern Football Netball League (SFNL).

=== Ladder ===
Pos	Team	Pld	W	L	D	PF	PA	PP	Pts	Qualification
1	St Francis Xavier (P)	16	14	2	0	1969	1009	195.1	56	Finals series
2	Albert Park	16	12	4	0	1717	1035	165.9	48	Finals series
3	Elsternwick	16	11	5	0	1534	1313	116.8	44	Finals series
4	La Trobe University	16	10	6	0	1432	1143	125.3	40	Finals series
5	Eley Park	16	9	7	0	1481	1452	102.0	36	
6	South Melbourne Districts	16	7	9	0	1112	1207	92.1	28	
7	Masala Dandenong	16	4	12	0	1129	1366	82.7	16	
8	South Mornington	16	3	13	0	1030	1773	58.1	12	
9	Box Hill North	16	2	14	0	880	1986	44.3	8	

Rules for classification: 1) points; 2) percentage; 3) number of points for.
(P) Premiers

=== Finals ===
2019 VAFA Division 4 Grand Final
Sunday, 15 September (2:30pm)	St Francis Xavier	def.	Albert Park	Trevor Barker Oval
7.3 (45); 10.3 (63); 13.3 (81); 15.4 (94)	Q1; Q2; Q3; Final	0.0 (0); 1.5 (11); 4.8 (32); 7.14 (56)
H. Coe 5, M. Coe 3, N. Aliotta 2, S. Woolley 2, D. Chin, R. Eggleston, S. Richards-Gill	Goals	H. Turner 2, L. Childs, C. Blizzard, J. Brick, J. Amies, A. Lupo
D. Soeurream, S. Woolley, D. Chin, S. Chin, H. Coe, R. Rhodes	Best	S. Hasselerharm, M. Corstorphin, T. Cattle, H. Turner, A. Lupo, T. Wilson
