= 2022 VAFA season =

121st season of the Victorian Amateur Football Association

- Date: 2 April − 23 September 2022
- Teams: 66

The 2022 VAFA season was the 121st season of the Victorian Amateur Football Association (VAFA), the largest senior community Australian rules football competition in Victoria. The season began on 2 April and concluded on 23 September, with 66 teams participating across seven divisions under a promotion and relegation system.

This was the first VAFA season since 2019 where finals series were held and premiers awarded, following the cancellation of the 2020 season and the curtailing of the 2021 season due to the impact of the COVID-19 pandemic.

== Background ==
KommunityTV, News Corp Australia's live-streaming platform, began a trial arrangement with the VAFA to broadcast finals matches in 2022.

== Notable events ==
- After declining relegation from Premier C following their last-placed finish in 2021, the Preston Bullants had its first win in 931 days in round 1 against UHS-VU, the club it had defeated in the 2019 Division 1 grand final.
- Several matches on 13 August 2022 were cancelled due to lightning. Old Xaverians defeated Old Trinity in Premier Division after leading at half-time prior to the match being called off, while Old Camberwell drew with Old Peninsula in Division 1 after the match was cancelled entirely.
- Fitzroy coach Luke Mahoney was awarded the 2022 AFL Victoria Coach of the Year award.
- Old Paradians won the Thirds Division 5 premiership – the club's last premiership in the VAFA before its move to the Northern Football Netball League (NFNL) at the end of the 2023 season.

== Premier ==
2022 Premier Division season
- Date: 2 April − 18 September 2022
- Teams: 10
- Premiers: St Kevin's; 5th Premier premiership
- Minor premiers: St Kevin's
- JN Woodrow Medallist: Harry Hill (Old Brighton − 20 votes); Fergus Borthwick (Old Melburnians − 20 votes)
- Leading goalkicker: Sam Grimley (University Blues − 56 goals)
- Matches played: 90

St Kevin's won the Premier Division premiership for the third time, defeating Old Brighton by 22 points in the grand final.

=== Ladder ===
Pos	Team	Pld	W	L	D	PF	PA	PP	Pts	Qualification
1	St Kevin's (P)	18	15	3	0	1539	920	167.3	60	Finals series
2	Collegians	18	13	5	0	1380	1142	120.8	52	Finals series
3	Old Xaverians	18	12	6	0	1516	1036	146.3	48	Finals series
4	Old Brighton	18	12	6	0	1388	1203	115.4	48	Finals series
5	Old Melburnians	18	11	7	0	1329	1262	105.3	44	
6	University Blues	18	9	9	0	1296	1252	103.5	36	
7	Old Scotch	18	8	10	0	1423	1489	95.6	32	
8	Caulfield Grammarians	18	5	13	0	1204	1498	80.4	20	
9	Old Trinity	18	3	15	0	879	1547	56.8	12	Relegation
10	St Bernard's	18	2	16	0	893	1498	59.6	8	Relegation

Rules for classification: 1) points; 2) percentage; 3) number of points for.
(P) Premiers

=== Finals ===
2022 VAFA Premier Grand Final
Sunday, 18 September (2:30pm)	St Kevin's	def.	Old Brighton	Trevor Barker Oval
1.3 (9); 1.10 (16); 3.14 (32); 5.16 (46)	Q1; Q2; Q3; Final	1.3 (9); 1.4 (10); 2.5 (17); 3.6 (24)
J. Darmody 2, S. Kennedy 2, L. Winter	Goals	F. Flockart, H. Dick, A. Jarnestrom
T. Jok, C. Ross, J. Tynan, W. Coates, L. Winter, J. Holden	Best	H. Dick, A. Jarnestrom, Q. Montanaro, W. Lewis, F. Flockart, M. Kennedy
The grand final was initially scheduled to be held at Elsternwick Park, but it was moved to Trevor Barker Oval due to the continued poor state of Elsternwick Park which had culminated in unprecedented conditions during the Premier B grand final on 17 September.

=== Club best and fairest ===
Club	Winner	Ref
Caulfield Grammarians	Declan Reilly	
Collegians	Kenny Ong	
Old Brighton	Harry Hill	
Old Melburnians	Josh Freezer	
Old Scotch	Tyler Sellers	
Old Trinity	Harry Thompson	
Old Xaverians	Marcus Stavrou	
St Bernard's	Jordan Farrell	
St Kevin's	Luke Winter	
University Blues	Marty Gleeson	

== Premier B ==
2022 Premier B season
- Date: 2 April − 17 September 2022
- Teams: 9
- Premiers: Old Haileybury; 4th Premier B premiership
- Minor premiers: University Blacks
- GT Moore Medallist: Jak Nardino (Beaumaris − 20 votes)
- Leading goalkicker: Durras Seccull (Old Haileybury − 60 goals)
- Matches played: 76

Old Haileyburians won the Premier B premiership for the fourth time, defeating favourites University Blacks by five points in the grand final.

=== Ladder ===
Pos	Team	Pld	W	L	D	PF	PA	PP	Pts	Qualification
1	University Blacks	16	15	1	0	1444	679	212.7	60	Finals series
2	Beaumaris	16	13	3	0	1449	962	150.6	52	Finals series
3	Old Haileybury (P)	16	11	5	0	1660	940	176.6	44	Finals series
4	Fitzroy	16	9	7	0	1124	1082	103.9	36	Finals series
5	De La Salle	16	7	9	0	1094	1131	96.7	28	
6	St Bedes/Mentone Tigers	16	6	9	1	1109	1251	88.7	26	
7	AJAX	16	6	9	1	1075	1308	82.2	26	
8	Williamstown CYMS	16	3	13	0	1062	1619	65.6	12	
9	Old Carey	16	1	15	0	816	1861	43.9	4	Relegation

Rules for classification: 1) points; 2) percentage; 3) number of points for.
(P) Premiers

=== Finals ===
2022 VAFA Premier B Grand Final
Saturday, 17 September (2:30pm)	University Blacks	def. by	Old Haileybury	Elsternwick Park
0.1 (1); 1.1 (7); 2.5 (17); 2.5 (17)	Q1; Q2; Q3; Final	1.5 (11); 1.5 (11); 2.6 (18); 2.10 (22)	Ian Cordner Medal: Joshua Steadman (University Blacks)
N. Hey, N. Caris	Goals	B. Seccull, J. Munro
J. Steadman, B. Oliver, H. Bennett, L. Vescio, J. Quaile, M. Dea	Best	B. Seccull, L. Riley, J. Paul, J. Gasparini, W. Gown, A. Bradtke
Heavy rain during the final quarter of the Premier B reserves grand final, which was the curtain-raiser to the senior grand final, resulted in appalling muddy ground conditions, resulting in a difficult and low scoring match.; Old Haileybury's score of 2.10 (22) was the second-lowest score in the club's history, almost breaking its record of 2.8 (20) against Old Xaverians in 1998.

=== Club best and fairest ===
Club	Winner	Ref
AJAX	Jordan Cohen	
Beaumaris	Jak Nardino	
De La Salle	Jake Williams	
Fitzroy	Ted Clayton	
Old Carey	Jonathan Marsh	
Old Haileybury	Jack Lonie	
St Bedes/Mentone Tigers	Tom Tyquin	
University Blacks	Campbell Moorfield	
Williamstown CYMS	Tom Johnstone	

== Premier C ==
2022 Premier C season
- Date: 2 April − 23 September 2022
- Teams: 11
- Premiers: Monash Blues; 2nd Premier C premiership
- Minor premiers: Monash Blues
- L Zachariah Medallist: Mac Cameron (Monash Blues − 35 votes)
- Leading goalkicker: Luke Scuderi (Old Ivanhoe − 64 goals)
- Matches played: 114

Monash Blues won the Premier C premiership for the second time, defeating Old Geelong by 21 points in the grand final.

=== Ladder ===
Pos	Team	Pld	W	L	D	PF	PA	PP	Pts	Qualification
1	Monash Blues (P)	20	18	2	0	1867	894	208.8	72	Finals series
2	Hampton Rovers	20	15	5	0	1826	1231	148.3	60	Finals series
3	Mazenod	20	13	7	0	1734	1379	125.7	52	Finals series
4	Old Geelong	20	12	8	0	1821	1278	142.5	48	Finals series
5	Old Ivanhoe	20	12	8	0	1714	1383	123.9	48	
6	Parkdale Vultures	20	11	9	0	1521	1197	127.1	44	
7	Ormond	20	10	10	0	1536	1496	102.7	40	
8	Marcellin	20	7	13	0	1345	1539	87.4	28	
9	Old Mentonians	20	7	13	0	1381	1631	84.7	28	
10	UHS-VU	20	4	16	0	1050	2052	51.2	16	Relegation
11	Preston Bullants	20	1	19	0	893	2608	34.2	4	Relegation

Rules for classification: 1) points; 2) percentage; 3) number of points for.
(P) Premiers

=== Finals ===
2022 VAFA Premier C Grand Final
Friday, 23 September (2:30pm)	Monash Blues	def.	Old Geelong	Trevor Barker Oval
2.1 (13); 4.5 (29); 7.7 (49); 8.9 (57)	Q1; Q2; Q3; Final	2.3 (15); 3.3 (21); 4.6 (30); 5.6 (36)	Best on ground: Beau Harris (Monash Blues)
N. Darling 3, R. Smart, C. Cosgriff, N. Argento, S. Simpson, T. Le Lievre	Goals	C. Dixon 2, S. Dixon, S. Hooper, S. Anderson
C. Cosgriff, N. Argento, M. King, N. Darling, B. Harris, D. Easson	Best	W. Horsfall, J. Sheridan, S. Dixon, J. Anderson, L. Radcliffe, C. Dixon
The grand final was initially scheduled to be held at Elsternwick Park, but it was moved to Trevor Barker Oval due to the continued poor state of Elsternwick Park which had culminated in unprecedented conditions during the Premier B grand final on 17 September.

=== Club best and fairest ===
Club	Winner	Ref
Hampton Rovers	Christian Carnovale	
Marcellin	Patrick Howe	
Mazenod	Matthew Fewings	
Monash Blues	Mac Cameron	
Old Geelong	Jack Sheridan	
Old Ivanhoe	Sam Wilcox	
Old Mentonians		
Ormond	Dae Szydlik	
Parkdale Vultures	Charlie Yee	
Preston Bullants	Rory Howard	
UHS-VU	Ben Dimatinna	

== Division 1 ==
2022 Division 1 season
- Date: 2 April − 10 September 2022
- Teams: 10
- Premiers: PEGS; 2nd Division 1 premiership
- Minor premiers: PEGS
- LS Pepper Medallist: Andrew Horne (PEGS − 19 votes)
- Leading goalkicker: Aaron Cloke (Oakleigh − 75 goals)
- Matches played: 93

PEGS won the Division 1 premiership for the second time, defeating Old Camberwell by 27 points in the grand final.

=== Ladder ===
Pos	Team	Pld	W	L	D	PF	PA	PP	Pts	Qualification
1	PEGS (P)	18	17	1	0	1875	740	253.4	68	Finals series
2	Kew	18	14	3	1	1038	1634	157.4	58	Finals series
3	Old Camberwell	17	10	5	3	1556	914	170.2	48	Finals series
4	Glen Eira	18	12	6	0	1492	951	156.9	48	Finals series
5	Prahran Assumption	18	10	7	1	1409	1187	118.7	42	
6	Oakleigh	18	10	8	0	1461	1339	109.1	40	
7	Therry Penola	18	7	11	0	1294	1583	81.7	28	
8	Old Peninsula	17	4	13	1	1028	1421	72.3	16	
9	Whitefriars	18	3	15	0	992	1611	61.6	12	Relegation
10	St Mary's Salesian	18	0	18	0	777	2734	28.4	0	Relegation

Rules for classification: 1) points; 2) percentage; 3) number of points for.
(P) Premiers

=== Finals ===
2022 VAFA Division 1 Grand Final
Saturday, 10 September (2:30pm)	PEGS	def.	Old Camberwell	Trevor Barker Oval
6.4 (40); 6.5 (41); 9.9 (63); 12.12 (84)	Q1; Q2; Q3; Final	0.1 (1); 2.4 (16); 5.5 (35); 8.9 (57)
J. Fenner 4, R. Simmons 2, A. Frazer, S. Ghasimzadeh, D. Benson, J. Erougian, B. Hannah, A. Binns	Goals	R. Verbi 3, N. Latsas, L. Thomas, H. Crothers, B. Hart, W. Dalrymple
S. Whillas, J. Fenner, R. Macdonald, C. Livori, A. Horne, B. Hannah	Best	J. Allen, B. Hart, R. Verbi, W. Dalrymple, A. Milham, T. Oliver

== Division 2 ==
2022 Division 2 season
- Date: 2 April − 11 September 2022
- Teams: 10
- Premiers: Ivanhoe; 2nd Division 2 premiership
- Minor premiers: Ivanhoe
- J Fullerton Medallist: Wayne Schultz (Ivanhoe − 19 votes)
- Leading goalkicker: Ash Close (Ivanhoe − 71 goals)
- Matches played: 94

Ivanhoe won the Division 2 premiership for the first time, defeating West Brunswick by one point in the grand final. It was Ivanhoe's first senior premiership in any division since 1969.

This was the last season for the Manningham Cobras and the Yarra Old Grammarians, which merged ahead of the 2023 VAFA season to form the Old Yarra Cobras Football Club.

=== Ladder ===
Pos	Team	Pld	W	L	D	PF	PA	PP	Pts	Qualification
1	Ivanhoe (P)	18	16	2	0	1881	864	217.7	64	Finals series
2	West Brunswick	18	15	3	0	1760	882	199.6	60	Finals series
3	Brunswick	18	13	4	1	1653	931	177.6	54	Finals series
4	Old Paradians	18	13	5	0	1443	1087	132.8	52	Finals series
5	MHSOB	18	11	6	1	1569	1165	134.7	46	
6	Aquinas	18	8	10	0	1289	1357	95.0	32	
7	Bulleen Templestowe	18	6	1	0	1036	1360	76.2	24	
8	Yarra Old Grammarians	18	3	15	0	1119	1617	69.2	12	
9	Power House	18	2	16	0	841	2083	40.4	8	Relegation
10	Manningham Cobras	18	2	16	0	721	1966	36.7	8	Relegation

Rules for classification: 1) points; 2) percentage; 3) number of points for.
(P) Premiers

=== Finals ===
2022 VAFA Division 2 Grand Final
Sunday, 11 September (2:30pm)	Ivanhoe	def.	West Brunswick	Trevor Barker Oval
2.3 (15); 3.5 (23); 5.6 (36); 9.9 (63)	Q1; Q2; Q3; Final	3.2 (20); 7.6 (48); 8.8 (56); 9.8 (62)
A. Close 5, A. Pipakis, C. O'Brien, N. Godfrey, L. Svarc	Goals	B. Hutchins 3, T. Cottrell 3, L. Buckler, E. Hayes-Hills, B. Irving
N. Carter, W. Schultz, C. O'Brien, A. Close, S. Selwood, J. Andonovski	Best	M. Turnbull, M. Risstrom, D. Ferrier, T. Cottrell, A. Rizzardo, E. Hayes-Hills

== Division 3 ==
2022 Division 3 season
- Date: 2 April − 10 September 2022
- Teams: 9
- Premiers: South Melbourne Districts; 2nd Division 3 premiership
- Minor premiers: South Melbourne Districts
- Hutchinson Medallist: Jack Hamilton (Parkside − 18 votes)
- Leading goalkicker: Oliver Dufficy (South Melbourne Districts − 60 votes)
- Matches played: 76

South Melbourne Districts won the Division 3 premiership for the second time, defeating Parkside by 12 points in the grand final.

=== Ladder ===
Pos	Team	Pld	W	L	D	PF	PA	PP	Pts	Qualification
1	South Melbourne Districts (P)	16	13	3	0	1342	766	175.2	52	Finals series
2	Elsternwick	16	13	3	0	1595	968	164.8	52	Finals series
3	Canterbury	16	12	4	0	1770	1065	166.2	48	Finals series
4	Parkside	16	10	6	0	1332	968	137.6	40	Finals series
5	Emmaus St Leo's	16	6	10	0	1277	1020	125.2	24	
6	Hawthorn	16	6	10	0	1337	1276	104.8	24	
7	Richmond Central	16	6	10	0	1130	1266	89.3	24	
8	North Brunswick	16	6	10	0	854	1119	76.3	24	Relegation
9	Westbourne Grammarians	16	0	16	0	496	2685	18.5	0	Relegation

Rules for classification: 1) points; 2) percentage; 3) number of points for.
(P) Premiers

=== Finals ===
2022 VAFA Division 3 Grand Final
Saturday, 10 September (2:30pm)	South Melbourne Districts	def.	Parkside	Garvey Oval
3.3 (21); 4.3 (27); 6.7 (43); 7.9 (51)	Q1; Q2; Q3; Final	0.2 (2); 1.5 (11); 3.6 (24); 5.9 (39)
G. Dixon 3, O. Dufficy 2, J. Brooker, L. Sfetkidis	Goals	M. Holden 2, D. Douglas, L. Balcombe, J. Hamilton
G. Dixon, O. Dufficy	Best	J. Hamilton, M. Romano, S. Mackie, M. Holden, B. Douglas

== Division 4 ==
2022 Division 4 season
- Date: 2 April − 11 September 2022
- Teams: 7
- Premiers: La Trobe University; 2nd Division 4 premiership
- Minor premiers: La Trobe University
- OJ Meehan Medallist: Sam Lee (Albert Park − 23 votes)
- Leading goalkicker: Riley Alexander (La Trobe University − 68 votes)
- Matches played: 58

La Trobe University won the Division 4 premiership for the second time, defeating Swinburne University by 15 points in the grand final.

=== Ladder ===
Pos	Team	Pld	W	L	D	PF	PA	PP	Pts	Qualification
1	La Trobe University (P)	15	14	1	0	1788	591	302.5	56	Finals series
2	Swinburne University	16	13	3	0	1404	1135	123.7	52	Finals series
3	St John's	15	11	4	0	1295	826	156.8	44	Finals series
4	Masala Dandenong	16	7	9	0	1350	1341	100.7	28	Finals series
5	Albert Park	15	6	9	0	1147	1267	90.5	24	
6	Eley Park	16	2	14	0	765	1891	40.5	8	
7	Box Hill North	15	1	14	0	722	1420	50.9	4	

Rules for classification: 1) points; 2) percentage; 3) number of points for.
(P) Premiers

=== Finals ===
2022 VAFA Division 4 Grand Final
Sunday, 11 September (2:30pm)	La Trobe University	def.	Swinburne University	Garvey Oval
2.3 (15); 5.7 (37); 6.8 (44); 11.11 (77)	Q1; Q2; Q3; Final	0.2 (2); 3.5 (23); 9.7 (61); 9.8 (62)
R. Alexander 4, M. Ogle, P. Lindsay, D. Thorn, B. Dowler, T. Whelan, B. Vicary, C. Scanlon	Goals	A. Vesty 3, C. Tayler-Turner 3, T. Ryan 3
M. Ogle, R. Alexander, A. Castles, R. Keath, T. Whelan, L. Webb	Best	B. Field, T. Hartney, R. Barry, A. Vesty, T. Ryan, L. Randello
