= Tom McCarthy (footballer) =

Australian rules footballer (born 2000)

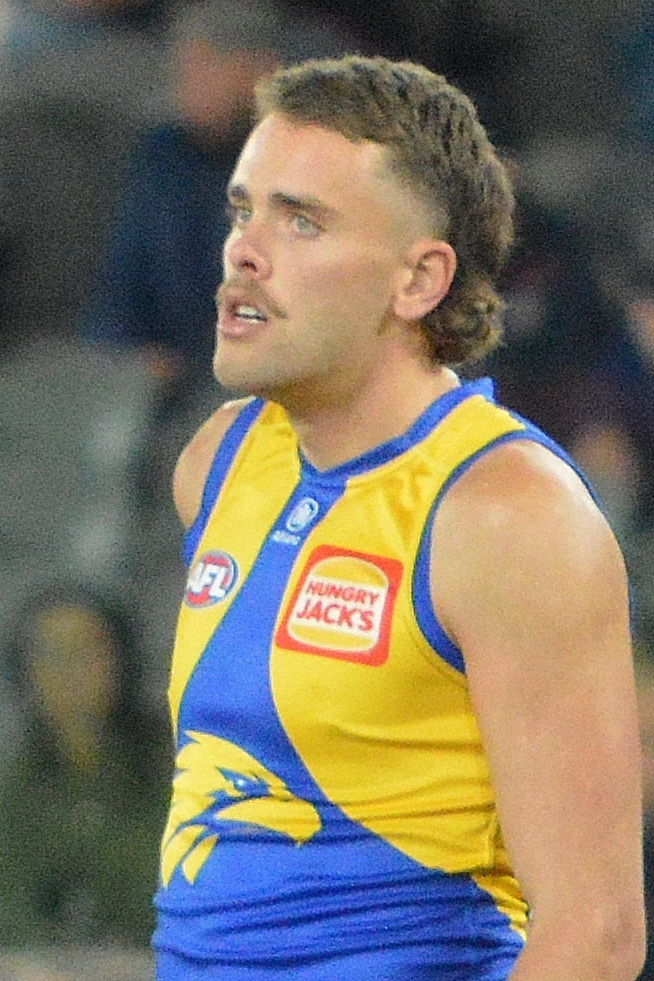
- McCarthy in May 2026

Personal information
- Full name: Thomas McCarthy
- Nickname: T-Mac
- Born: 12 July 2000 (age 26)
- Original team: Dingley (SFNL)/Richmond (VFL)
- Draft: No. 1, 2025 mid-season rookie draft
- Height: 187 cm (6 ft 2 in)
- Position: Defender

Club information
- Current club: West Coast
- Number: 18

Playing career^{1}
Years	Club	Games (Goals)
2025–	West Coast	30 (1)
- ^{1} Playing statistics correct to the end of round 22, 2026.

Career highlights
- Old Mentonians best and fairest: 2022

Thomas McCarthy (born 12 July 2000) is an Australian rules footballer who currently plays for the West Coast Eagles in the Australian Football League (AFL).

== Early career ==
McCarthy grew up supporting Melbourne and idolised Jayden Hunt (who later became his teammate at West Coast). He played junior football with the Cheltenham Panthers in the South Metro Junior Football League (SMJFL).

After leaving Cheltenham, McCarthy joined Old Mentonians in the Victorian Amateur Football Association (VAFA) under-19s competition in 2018, playing two senior matches during the season. He played a further twelve senior games in 2019, and – following the cancellation of the 2020 season – McCarthy continued to play at the senior level, kicking ten goals in eleven senior games during the curtailed 2021 season.

McCarthy won the Old Mentonians senior best and fairest award in 2022. He left the club – which went into recess several months later – and joined Highett in the Southern Football Netball League (SFNL). He came second in Highett's best and fairest count for the 2023 season by 1 vote.

In 2024, McCarthy joined Richmond in the Victorian Football League (VFL). He made his VFL debut against Coburg in round 6. At the end of the 2024 SFNL season, McCarthy left Highett to join Dingley. He also played one game for Banks in the Northern Territory Football League (NTFL) Premier Division reserves competition in October 2024, earning a best on ground nomination.

In addition to football, McCarthy played for the Cheltenham Park Cricket Club in the South East Cricket Association (SECA).

== AFL career ==
In May 2025, it was reported that McCarthy would be signed by West Coast in the 2025 AFL mid-season rookie draft. After playing against North Melbourne, McCarthy was rested by Richmond for the following match to avoid the possibility of an injury in the VFL prior to the draft.

McCarthy was selected by West Coast as the number-one pick in the mid-season rookie draft on 28 May 2025. He played two games for the club's reserves team in the West Australian Football League (WAFL) before being named for his AFL debut in round 14 against Carlton at Optus Stadium. McCarthy starred in his first AFL game with 31 disposals in a 34-point defeat, recording the most disposals of any West Coast player in the 2025 season and the most by a West Coast player on debut ever.

== Senior State/Community League Statistics ==
Year	Team	League	Games	Goals	Best Player
2018	Old Mentonians	VAFA	2	1	1
2019	Old Mentonians	VAFA	12	4	5
2021	Old Mentonians	VAFA	11	10	4
2022	Old Mentonians	VAFA	20	8	12
2023	Highett	SFNL	20	16	13
2024	Highett	SFNL	6	9	4
2024	Richmond Reserves	VFL	15	1	5
2025	Banks	NTFL	1	1	1
2025	Richmond Reserves	VFL	7	0	6
2025	West Coast Reserves	WAFL	2	1	0

As of 3 June 2026

== Statistics ==
Updated to the end of round 22, 2026.

Legend
G	Goals	K	Kicks	D	Disposals	T	Tackles
B	Behinds	H	Handballs	M	Marks

Season	Team	No.	Games	Totals							Averages (per game)							Votes
Season	Team	No.	Games	G	B	K	H	D	M	T	G	B	K	H	D	M	T	Votes
2025	West Coast	45	10	0	1	154	82	236	46	21	0.0	0.1	15.4	8.2	23.6	4.6	2.1	0
2026	West Coast	18	20	1	1	343	111	454	116	41	0.1	0.1	17.2	5.6	22.7	5.8	2.1	0
Career			30	1	2	497	193	690	162	62	0.0	0.1	16.6	6.4	23.0	5.4	2.1	0
