= 2021 VAFA season =

120th season of the Victorian Amateur Football Association

2022 VAFA season
- Date: 10 April − 2 September 2021
- Teams: 66

The 2021 VAFA season was the 120th season of the Victorian Amateur Football Association (VAFA), the largest senior community Australian rules football competition in Victoria. The season began on 10 April before it was curtailed on 2 September 2021 without premierships awarded, due to the impact of the COVID-19 pandemic.

No automatic promotion and relegation was applied following the season, and clubs who finished in the bottom two or highest four positions on the ladder would instead have to formally apply on whether to be promoted or relegated for the 2022 season.

This was the first time the VAFA had curtailed a season since 1940, when competition was suspended due to World War II.

== Background ==
=== 2020 season cancellation ===
The 2020 VAFA season was meant to have been the 120th season of the VAFA.

On 17 March 2020, the VAFA announced that the season would be postponed until 2 May because of the COVID-19 pandemic. However, the season did not resume amid ongoing COVID-19 restrictions, and was officially cancelled on 1 July without a game being played.

=== 2021 season abandonment ===
The 2021 season began on 10 April, with the senior men's home-and-away season scheduled to end on 28 August ahead of a finals series would be held. The VAFA extended its agreement with RSN 927 in February 2021, with RSN continuing to serve as the official VAFA radio broadcaster.

On 15 August, the VAFA cancelled the remaining home-and-away games, but stated their intention to still hold a finals series. However, following the extension of Melbourne's sixth COVID-19 lockdown, the VAFA announced on 1 September that the season would be abandoned without any premierships awarded.

== Association membership ==
St Francis Xavier and South Mornington left the VAFA at the end of the 2019 season to join the Southern Football Netball League (SFNL).

Prior to the planned start of the 2020 season, Peninsula Old Boys renamed to Old Peninsula Football Club after introducing a women's team.

== Notable events ==
- Fitzroy's Donovan Toohey kicked a goal after the siren to defeat St Bedes/Mentone Tigers by three points in Premier B on 22 May.
- Caulfield Grammarians won a senior game in A Section/Premier Division for the first time since 1987.
- Former Hawthorn player Jacob Campbell died from cancer on 28 May 2021.
- In July 2021, antisemitic graffiti was spray-painted on the clubrooms of AJAX Football Club (which is the first and only fully Jewish Australian rules football club). The incident was condemned by the VAFA as an "abhorrent and unlawful racial attack", and the Beaumaris Football Club would later be awarded with a Medal of Courage from the Anti-Defamation Commission for its stance against antisemitism and racism.
- In August 2021, a Richmond Central player recorded Kew players training (against COVID-19 lockdown rules) at Richmond Central's home ground, Kevin Bartlett Oval, and was also involved in a verbal confrontation with Kew coach Ian Aitken. Kew said it did not sanction the training session, and the VAFA did not sanction the club, although it did refer Aitken to AFL Victoria.

== Premier ==
2021 VAFA Premier season
- Teams: 10
- Minor premiers: Old Xaverians
- Wooden spooners: Old Trinity
- JN Woodrow Medal: Marcus Stavrou (Old Xaverians − 14 votes)

=== Ladder ===
| Pos | Team | Pld | W | L | D | PF | PA | PP | Pts | Qualification |
|---|---|---|---|---|---|---|---|---|---|---|
| 1 | Old Xaverians | 11 | 9 | 2 | 0 | 1060 | 626 | 169.3 | 36 | |
| 2 | St Kevin's | 11 | 9 | 2 | 0 | 910 | 619 | 147.0 | 36 | |
| 3 | Old Brighton | 11 | 8 | 3 | 0 | 948 | 807 | 117.5 | 32 | |
| 4 | Caulfield Grammarians | 11 | 7 | 4 | 0 | 1041 | 892 | 116.7 | 28 | |
| 5 | University Blues | 11 | 6 | 5 | 0 | 851 | 930 | 91.5 | 24 | |
| 6 | Old Melburnians | 11 | 5 | 6 | 0 | 879 | 818 | 107.5 | 20 | |
| 7 | St Bernard's | 11 | 5 | 6 | 0 | 831 | 845 | 98.3 | 20 | |
| 8 | Old Scotch | 11 | 3 | 8 | 0 | 619 | 932 | 66.4 | 12 | |
| 9 | Collegians | 11 | 2 | 9 | 0 | 693 | 894 | 77.5 | 8 | Can apply for relegation |
| 10 | Old Trinity | 11 | 1 | 10 | 0 | 648 | 1117 | 58.0 | 4 | Can apply for relegation |

Rules for classification: 1) points; 2) percentage; 3) number of points for.

== Premier B ==
2021 VAFA Premier B season
- Teams: 10
- Minor premiers: University Blacks
- Wooden spooners: Parkdale Vultures

=== Ladder ===
| Pos | Team | Pld | W | L | D | PF | PA | PP | Pts | Qualification |
|---|---|---|---|---|---|---|---|---|---|---|
| 1 | University Blacks | 11 | 10 | 1 | 0 | 1042 | 541 | 192.6 | 40 | Can apply for promotion |
| 2 | Beaumaris | 11 | 9 | 2 | 0 | 917 | 505 | 181.6 | 36 | Can apply for promotion |
| 3 | Old Haileybury | 11 | 9 | 2 | 0 | 1039 | 688 | 151.0 | 36 | Can apply for promotion |
| 4 | De La Salle | 11 | 8 | 3 | 0 | 937 | 679 | 138.0 | 32 | Can apply for promotion |
| 5 | St Bedes/Mentone Tigers | 11 | 4 | 7 | 0 | 853 | 828 | 103.0 | 16 | |
| 6 | Fitzroy | 11 | 4 | 7 | 0 | 852 | 912 | 93.4 | 16 | |
| 7 | Williamstown CYMS | 11 | 4 | 7 | 0 | 761 | 940 | 81.0 | 16 | |
| 8 | AJAX | 11 | 4 | 7 | 0 | 568 | 804 | 70.7 | 16 | |
| 9 | Old Carey | 11 | 3 | 8 | 0 | 589 | 828 | 71.1 | 12 | Can apply for relegation |
| 10 | Parkdale Vultures | 11 | 0 | 11 | 0 | 399 | 1232 | 32.4 | 0 | Can apply for relegation |

Rules for classification: 1) points; 2) percentage; 3) number of points for.

== Premier C ==
2021 VAFA Premier C season
- Teams: 10
- Minor premiers: Monash Blues
- Wooden spooners: Preston Bullants

=== Ladder ===
| Pos | Team | Pld | W | L | D | PF | PA | PP | Pts | Qualification |
|---|---|---|---|---|---|---|---|---|---|---|
| 1 | Monash Blues | 11 | 10 | 1 | 0 | 1033 | 525 | 196.8 | 40 | Can apply for promotion |
| 2 | Old Geelong | 11 | 9 | 2 | 0 | 945 | 738 | 128.1 | 36 | Can apply for promotion |
| 3 | Ormond | 11 | 7 | 4 | 0 | 993 | 779 | 127.5 | 28 | Can apply for promotion |
| 4 | Old Ivanhoe | 11 | 7 | 4 | 0 | 903 | 745 | 121.2 | 28 | Can apply for promotion |
| 5 | Mazenod | 11 | 7 | 4 | 0 | 942 | 785 | 120.0 | 28 | |
| 6 | Hampton Rovers | 11 | 5 | 6 | 0 | 1022 | 883 | 115.7 | 20 | |
| 7 | Marcellin | 11 | 4 | 7 | 0 | 848 | 775 | 109.4 | 16 | |
| 8 | Old Mentonians | 11 | 4 | 7 | 0 | 811 | 928 | 87.4 | 16 | |
| 9 | UHS-VU | 11 | 2 | 9 | 0 | 540 | 1280 | 44.9 | 8 | Can apply for relegation |
| 10 | Preston Bullants | 11 | 0 | 11 | 0 | 597 | 1272 | 46.9 | 0 | Can apply for relegation |

Rules for classification: 1) points; 2) percentage; 3) number of points for.

== Division 1 ==
2021 VAFA Division 1 season
- Teams: 10
- Minor premiers: Old Camberwell
- Wooden spooners: Brunswick

=== Ladder ===
| Pos | Team | Pld | W | L | D | PF | PA | PP | Pts | Qualification |
|---|---|---|---|---|---|---|---|---|---|---|
| 1 | Old Camberwell | 11 | 10 | 1 | 0 | 1032 | 623 | 165.7 | 40 | Can apply for promotion |
| 2 | Whitefriars | 11 | 10 | 1 | 0 | 1101 | 677 | 162.6 | 40 | Can apply for promotion |
| 3 | Kew | 11 | 9 | 2 | 0 | 985 | 693 | 142.1 | 36 | Can apply for promotion |
| 4 | Prahran Assumption | 11 | 7 | 4 | 0 | 816 | 688 | 118.6 | 28 | Can apply for promotion |
| 5 | St Mary's Salesian | 11 | 5 | 6 | 0 | 814 | 915 | 89.0 | 20 | |
| 6 | Therry Penola | 11 | 5 | 6 | 0 | 748 | 953 | 78.5 | 20 | |
| 7 | PEGS | 11 | 4 | 7 | 0 | 843 | 837 | 36.4 | 16 | |
| 8 | Old Peninsula | 11 | 3 | 8 | 0 | 641 | 944 | 67.9 | 12 | |
| 9 | Oakleigh | 11 | 2 | 9 | 0 | 776 | 1013 | 76.6 | 8 | Can apply for relegation |
| 10 | Brunswick | 11 | 0 | 11 | 0 | 580 | 993 | 58.4 | 0 | Can apply for relegation |

Rules for classification: 1) points; 2) percentage; 3) number of points for.

== Division 2 ==
2021 VAFA Division 2 season
- Teams: 10
- Minor premiers: Glen Eira
- Wooden spooners: Power House

=== Ladder ===
Bulleen Templestowe forfeited their round 10 game against MHSOB.

| Pos | Team | Pld | W | WF | L | D | PF | PA | PP | Pts | Qualification |
|---|---|---|---|---|---|---|---|---|---|---|---|
| 1 | Glen Eira | 11 | 11 | 0 | 0 | 0 | 1170 | 446 | 262.3 | 44 | Can apply for promotion |
| 2 | MHSOB | 10 | 9 | 1 | 1 | 0 | 1306 | 516 | 253.1 | 40 | Can apply for promotion |
| 3 | West Brunswick | 11 | 8 | 0 | 3 | 0 | 932 | 597 | 156.1 | 32 | Can apply for promotion |
| 4 | Old Paradians | 11 | 8 | 0 | 3 | 0 | 892 | 764 | 116.8 | 32 | Can apply for promotion |
| 5 | Ivanhoe | 11 | 6 | 0 | 5 | 0 | 865 | 743 | 116.4 | 24 | |
| 6 | Manningham Cobras | 11 | 4 | 0 | 7 | 0 | 739 | 877 | 84.3 | 16 | |
| 7 | Aquinas | 11 | 4 | 0 | 7 | 0 | 756 | 958 | 78.9 | 16 | |
| 8 | Yarra Old Grammarians | 11 | 2 | 0 | 9 | 0 | 708 | 1116 | 63.4 | 8 | |
| 9 | Bulleen Templestowe | 10 | 1 | 0 | 10 | 0 | 581 | 1265 | 45.9 | 4 | Can apply for relegation |
| 10 | Power House | 11 | 1 | 0 | 10 | 0 | 543 | 1267 | 42.7 | 4 | Can apply for relegation |

Rules for classification: 1) points; 2) percentage; 3) number of points for.

== Division 3 ==
2021 VAFA Division 3 season
- Teams: 8
- Minor premiers: Hawthorn
- Wooden spooners: Albert Park

=== Ladder ===
| Pos | Team | Pld | W | L | D | PF | PA | PP | Pts | Qualification |
|---|---|---|---|---|---|---|---|---|---|---|
| 1 | Hawthorn | 11 | 8 | 2 | 1 | 930 | 680 | 136.8 | 34 | Can apply for promotion |
| 2 | Parkside | 11 | 8 | 2 | 1 | 950 | 711 | 133.6 | 34 | Can apply for promotion |
| 3 | Emmaus St Leo's | 11 | 8 | 3 | 0 | 1162 | 615 | 188.9 | 32 | Can apply for promotion |
| 4 | Richmond Central | 11 | 8 | 3 | 0 | 1185 | 702 | 168.8 | 32 | Can apply for promotion |
| 5 | North Brunswick | 11 | 4 | 7 | 0 | 962 | 840 | 114.5 | 16 | |
| 6 | Canterbury | 11 | 4 | 7 | 0 | 870 | 908 | 95.8 | 16 | |
| 7 | Westbourne Grammarians | 11 | 3 | 8 | 0 | 558 | 1185 | 47.0 | 12 | Can apply for relegation |
| 8 | Albert Park | 11 | 0 | 11 | 0 | 410 | 1386 | 29.6 | 0 | Can apply for relegation |

Rules for classification: 1) points; 2) percentage; 3) number of points for.

== Division 4 ==
2021 VAFA Division 4 season
- Teams: 8
- Minor premiers: Elsternwick
- Wooden spooners: Box Hill North

=== Ladder ===
| Pos | Team | Pld | W | L | D | PF | PA | PP | Pts | Qualification |
|---|---|---|---|---|---|---|---|---|---|---|
| 1 | Elsternwick | 11 | 10 | 1 | 0 | 1709 | 385 | 443.9 | 40 | Can apply for promotion |
| 2 | South Melbourne Districts | 11 | 10 | 1 | 0 | 1355 | 443 | 305.9 | 40 | Can apply for promotion |
| 3 | La Trobe University | 11 | 6 | 5 | 0 | 873 | 946 | 92.3 | 24 | Can apply for promotion |
| 4 | St John's | 11 | 6 | 5 | 0 | 777 | 862 | 90.1 | 24 | Can apply for promotion |
| 5 | Eley Park | 11 | 4 | 7 | 0 | 732 | 986 | 74.2 | 16 | |
| 6 | Masala Dandenong | 11 | 4 | 7 | 0 | 749 | 1203 | 62.3 | 16 | |
| 7 | Swinburne University | 11 | 2 | 9 | 0 | 658 | 1141 | 57.8 | 8 | |
| 8 | Box Hill North | 11 | 2 | 9 | 0 | 479 | 1366 | 18.2 | 8 | |

Rules for classification: 1) points; 2) percentage; 3) number of points for.
