= 2016 VAFA season =

116th season of the Victorian Amateur Football Association

- Date: 9 April − 18 September 2016
- Teams: 70
- Matches played: 641

The 2016 VAFA season was the 116th season of the Victorian Amateur Football Association (VAFA), the largest senior community Australian rules football competition in Victoria. The season began on 9 April and concluded on 18 September, with 70 teams participating across seven divisions under a promotion and relegation system.

== Background ==
On 1 July 2016, the VAFA announced it would make changes to the structures of Division 2, Division 3 and Division 4 following a review in order to ensure a "competitive and fair fixture" for the 2017 season.

- Division 2: Two clubs promoted to Division 1, one relegated to Division 3
- Division 3: Two clubs promoted to Division 2, three relegated to Division 4
- Division 4: Two clubs promoted to Division 3

== Association membership ==
In early 2016, Glen Eira and the Monash Gryphons announced their intention to merge for the 2016 season. This ultimately did not occur and the clubs remained separate entities, with Glen Eira competing in Division 3 while Monash participated in the Club XVIII competition. The clubs would later amalgamate to form the Glen Eira Gryphons for the 2017 season.

=== Name changes ===
The Northern Blues changed its name to Preston Bullants Amateur Football Club, and NOBs/St Pat's was renamed to Brunswick NOBSPC.

== Premier ==
2016 VAFA Premier season
- Date: 9 April − 18 September 2016
- Teams: 10
- Premiers: Old Xaverians; 14th Premier premiership
- Minor premiers: Old Trinity
- JN Woodrow Medal: Jake Williams (De La Salle − 26 votes)
- Leading goalkicker: Matthew Handley (Old Xaverians − 51 goals)
- Matches played: 94

=== Ladder ===
Pos	Team	Pld	W	L	D	PF	PA	PP	Pts	Qualification
1	Old Trinity	18	13	4	1	1355	1115	121.5	54	Finals series
2	University Blues	18	13	5	0	1175	1032	113.9	52	Finals series
3	Old Xaverians (P)	18	12	6	0	1592	1111	143.3	48	Finals series
4	University Blacks	18	11	7	0	1395	1101	126.7	44	Finals series
5	De La Salle	18	10	8	0	1577	1317	119.7	40	
6	Old Melburnians	18	8	9	1	1252	1252	100.0	34	
7	Collegians	18	8	10	0	1157	1131	102.3	32	
8	St Kevin's	18	8	10	0	1439	1495	96.3	32	
9	St Bernard's	18	5	13	0	1350	1535	88.0	20	Relegation
10	Old Carey	18	1	17	0	960	2163	44.4	4	Relegation

Rules for classification: 1) points; 2) percentage; 3) number of points for.
(P) Premiers

=== Finals ===
2016 VAFA Premier Grand Final
Sunday, 18 September (2:20pm)	Old Trinity	def. by	Old Xaverians	Ikon Park
3.2 (20); 4.3 (27); 5.9 (39); 7.12 (54)	Q1; Q2; Q3; Final	2.14 (16); 5.6 (36); 6.7 (43); 9.7 (61)
E. Weatherson 2, A. Hasiotis, G. Hamilton, L. Juric, H. Tinney, C. Manoussakis	Goals	L. Keith 2, C. Beetham 2, M. Handley 2, T. Thomas, B. Goss, L. Denton
C. Pohl, F. Stewart, L. Pacconi, J. Hunt, G. Hamilton, H. Tinney	Best	C. Beetham, N. Wynne, L. Denton, J. Shaw, C. Margin, T. Dynon

== Premier B ==
2016 VAFA Premier B season
- Date: 9 April − 17 September 2016
- Teams: 10
- Premiers: Beaumaris; 1st Premier B premiership
- Minor premiers: Beaumaris
- GT Moore Medal: Charlie Dillon (Parkdale Vultures − 16 votes)
- Leading goalkicker: Daniel Anthony (Old Brighton − 46 goals); David Fayman (AJAX − 46 goals)
- Matches played: 94

=== Ladder ===
Pos	Team	Pld	W	L	D	PF	PA	PP	Pts	Qualification
1	Beaumaris (P)	18	13	4	1	1752	1234	142.0	54	Finals series
2	St Bedes/Mentone Tigers	18	13	5	0	1772	1385	127.9	52	Finals series
3	Old Scotch	18	11	7	0	1638	1262	129.8	44	Finals series
4	Monash Blues	18	11	7	0	1311	1307	100.3	44	Finals series
5	Fitzroy	18	10	7	1	1468	1385	106.0	42	
6	Old Brighton	18	9	9	0	1534	1459	105.1	36	
7	AJAX	18	7	11	0	1289	1521	84.8	28	
8	Parkdale Vultures	18	7	11	0	1294	1552	83.4	28	
9	Old Haileybury	18	4	14	0	1352	1610	84.0	16	Relegation
10	Hampton Rovers	18	4	14	0	1201	1896	63.3	16	Relegation

Rules for classification: 1) points; 2) percentage; 3) number of points for.
(P) Premiers

=== Finals ===
2016 VAFA Premier B Grand Final
Saturday, 17 September (2:15pm)	St Bedes/Mentone Tigers	def. by	Beaumaris	Trevor Barker Oval
1.2 (8); 5.7 (37); 6.9 (45); 10.10 (70)	Q1; Q2; Q3; Final	3.3 (21); 3.5 (23); 9.14 (68); 14.17 (101)
E. Uthayakumar 2, C. Richards, S. Richards, J. Robertson, L. Velluto, M. Barnes, J. Cowan, L. Mirams, B. Denton	Goals	A. Schneider 3, D. Gribbin 3, S. Milne 2, J. Ward 2, D. Kelly 2, S. Braithwaite, N. Dickinson
P. Wintle, C. Mangoni, S. Richards, J. Tyquin, E. Uthayakumar, T. Garside	Best	M. Petering, T. Dean, A. Carroll, J. Di Natale, B. McLean, L. Hiscock

== Premier C ==
2016 VAFA Premier C season
- Date: 9 April − 17 September 2016
- Teams: 10
- Premiers: Mazenod; 2nd Premier C premiership
- Minor premiers: Caulfield Grammarians
- L Zachariah Medal: Liam Kinsella (Kew − 21 votes)
- Leading goalkicker: Adrian Del Monte (Old Ivanhoe − 61 goals)
- Matches played: 94

=== Ladder ===
Pos	Team	Pld	W	L	D	PF	PA	PP	Pts	Qualification
1	Caulfield Grammarians	18	15	3	0	1791	1260	142.1	60	Finals series
2	Mazenod (P)	18	14	3	1	1584	1136	139.4	58	Finals series
3	Peninsula Old Boys	18	12	6	0	1671	1204	138.8	48	Finals series
4	Old Ivanhoe	18	10	7	1	1437	1468	97.9	42	Finals series
5	Kew	18	7	11	0	1488	1533	97.1	28	
6	Old Camberwell	18	7	11	0	1464	1593	91.9	28	
7	Williamstown CYMS	18	7	11	0	1447	1631	88.7	28	
8	Marcellin	18	6	10	1	1444	1658	87.1	28	
9	Oakleigh	18	5	13	0	1395	1785	78.2	20	Relegation
10	Ormond	18	5	13	0	1351	1804	74.9	20	Relegation

Rules for classification: 1) points; 2) percentage; 3) number of points for.
(P) Premiers

=== Finals ===
2016 VAFA Premier C Grand Final
Saturday, 17 September (2:15pm)	Mazenod	def.	Peninsula Old Boys	Elsternwick Park
0.3 (3); 7.6 (48); 9.8 (62); 13.15 (93)	Q1; Q2; Q3; Final	1.2 (8); 4.4 (28); 7.7 (49); 8.11 (59)	Michael Ritterman Medal: Liam Weslford (Mazenod)
J. Murdock 4, A. Taun-Henderson 2, T. Cincotta 2, R. Thomas, N. Thomas, B. Kovac, L. Riley, B. Phibbs	Goals	B. Southam 2, W. Crowder, S. Payze, B. Kellerman, S. Grigg, W. Harbinson, G. Fletcher
L. Riley, A. Patti, J. Hill, L. Welsford, J. Murdock, S. Inglis	Best	A. Smrdel, J. Pomeroy, B. Schuurman, J. Moignard, N. Fisher, T. Feldgen

== Division 1 ==
2016 VAFA Division 1 season
- Date: 9 April − 10 September 2016
- Teams: 10
- Premiers: Old Geelong; 3rd Division 1 premiership
- Minor premiers: Old Geelong
- LS Pepper Medal: Daniel Maitland (Old Mentonians − 24 votes)
- Leading goalkicker: Jarrod Bannister (Therry Penola − 75 goals)
- Matches played: 94

=== Ladder ===
Pos	Team	Pld	W	L	D	PF	PA	PP	Pts	Qualification
1	Old Geelong (P)	18	14	4	0	1963	1262	155.6	56	Finals series
2	Old Mentonians	18	14	4	0	1970	1284	153.4	56	Finals series
3	PEGS	18	12	6	0	1522	1324	115.0	48	Finals series
4	Therry Penola	18	11	7	0	1600	1313	121.9	44	Finals series
5	St Mary's Salesian	18	10	8	0	1662	1505	110.4	40	
6	Ivanhoe	18	8	10	0	1394	1720	81.1	32	
7	Whitefriars	18	6	12	0	1574	1915	82.2	24	
8	Brunswick NOBSPC	18	6	12	0	1136	1685	67.4	24	
9	Old Paradians	18	5	12	1	1297	1600	81.1	22	Relegation
10	Prahran Assumption	18	3	14	1	1184	1694	69.9	14	Relegation

Rules for classification: 1) points; 2) percentage; 3) number of points for.
(P) Premiers

=== Finals ===
2016 VAFA Division 1 Grand Final
Saturday, 10 September (2:20pm)	Old Mentonians	def. by	Old Geelong	Coburg City Oval
5.3 (33); 7.5 (47); 10.12 (72); 12.14 (86)	Q1; Q2; Q3; Final	3.3 (21); 9.7 (61); 11.9 (75); 14.10 (94)
B. Schubert 3, D. Mills 3, K. Smith-Cameron 2, L. Hull, C. Edgeworth, D. Brown, T. Ward	Goals	J. Grimshaw 3, C. Wood 2, G. Burbury 2, S. Youngman, B. Gore, R. Parsons, A. Leahy, R. de Crespigny, A. Bird, T. Balcombe
D. Payton, D. Maitland, D. Mills, O. Jones, A. Palmer	Best	C. Wood, J. Barry, W. Sloss, J. Hutley, C. O'Brien, S. James

== Division 2 ==
2016 VAFA Division 2 season
- Date: 9 April − 10 September 2016
- Teams: 9
- Premiers: Preston Bullants; 1st Division 2 premiership
- Minor premiers: St John's
- J Fullerton Medal: Glenn Costas (St John's − 25 votes)
- Leading goalkicker: Aaron Thornton (St John's − 75 goals)
- Matches played: 76

=== Ladder ===
Pos	Team	Pld	W	L	D	PF	PA	PP	Pts	Qualification
1	St John's	16	15	1	0	1739	838	207.5	60	Finals series
2	West Brunswick	16	13	3	0	1512	1038	145.7	52	Finals series
3	Preston Bullants (P)	16	13	3	0	1492	1091	136.8	52	Finals series
4	Yarra Valley Old Boys	16	9	7	0	1374	1272	108.0	36	Finals series
5	MHSOB	16	8	8	0	1343	1309	102.6	32	
6	Old Eltham Collegians	16	5	11	0	1343	1456	92.2	20	
7	Bulleen Templestowe	16	5	11	0	1048	1323	79.2	20	
8	Emmaus St Leo's	16	4	12	0	1356	1491	91.0	16	
9	Richmond Central	16	0	16	0	719	2108	34.1	0	Relegation

Rules for classification: 1) points; 2) percentage; 3) number of points for.
(P) Premiers

=== Finals ===
2016 VAFA Division 2 Grand Final
Saturday, 10 September (2:20pm)	St John's	def. by	Preston Bullants	Casey Fields
1.3 (9); 3.6 (24); 4.8 (32); 9.9 (63)	Q1; Q2; Q3; Final	2.1 (13); 5.3 (33); 7.6 (48); 11.9 (75)	Best on ground: Damon Marcon (Preston Bullants)
A. Thornton 3, T. Edwards 2, D. Cattolico, A. Brannan, M. Nicholson, C. Ladson	Goals	M. Holmes 3, D. Marcon 3, S. Calcedo 3, J. Powell 2
L. O'Connor, A. Brannan, D. Cattolico, G. Costas, D. Webb, K. Ash	Best	D. Marcon, S. Calcedo, D. Calcedo, N. Parkes, A. Ricco, A. Marcon

== Division 3 ==
2016 VAFA Division 3 season
- Date: 9 April − 11 September 2016
- Teams: 12
- Premiers: Glen Eira; 1st Division 3 premiership
- Minor premiers: Hawthorn
- Hutchinson Medal: Julius Waras Carstensen (Glen Eira − 29 votes)
- Leading goalkicker: Mitchell Gleeson (La Trobe University − 75 goals)
- Matches played: 113

=== Ladder ===
Pos	Team	Pld	W	L	D	PF	PA	PP	Pts	Qualification
1	Hawthorn	18	17	1	0	2553	1101	231.9	68	Finals series
2	Glen Eira (P)	18	16	2	0	2027	1109	182.8	64	Finals series
3	La Trobe University	18	15	3	0	1975	928	212.8	60	Finals series
4	UHS-VU	18	12	6	0	1586	1397	113.5	48	Finals series
5	Power House	18	10	8	0	1495	1488	100.5	40	Finals series
6	South Melbourne Districts	18	10	8	0	1470	1477	99.5	40	Finals series
7	Canterbury	18	8	10	0	1675	1755	95.4	32	
8	Albert Park	18	8	10	0	1353	1482	91.3	32	
9	Swinburne University	18	5	13	0	1355	1692	80.1	20	
10	Aquinas	18	3	15	0	1139	1857	61.3	12	Relegation
11	Elsternwick	11	2	16	0	1184	2231	53.1	8	Relegation
12	Parkside	18	2	16	0	984	2279	43.2	8	Relegation

Rules for classification: 1) points; 2) percentage; 3) number of points for.
(P) Premiers

=== Finals ===
2016 VAFA Division 3 Grand Final
Sunday, 11 September (2:20pm)	Hawthorn	def. by	Glen Eira	Coburg City Oval
3.6 (24); 6.8 (44); 7.11 (53); 7.14 (56)	Q1; Q2; Q3; Final	4.4 (28); 9.5 (59); 12.5 (77); 16.7 (103)
D. Pritchard, R. Ogge, S. Gold, J. Ince, D. Kennedy, D. Tremewen, L. Piccolo	Goals	A. Barrett 5, L. Stevens 3, J. Waras Carstensen 2, J. King 2, L. Pound, K. Cherian, C. Higgins, M. Savage
D. Pritchard, D. Kennedy, R. Ogge, T. Whittle, M. McNeill, C. Thomas	Best	M. Harris, T. Richardson, J. Mills, A. Carey, A. Barrett, D. Petsinis

== Division 4 ==
2016 VAFA Division 4 season
- Date: 9 April − 10 September 2016
- Teams: 9
- Premiers: Westbourne Grammarians; 1st Division 4 premiership
- Minor premiers: Westbourne Grammarians; 1st Division 4 minor premiership
- OJ Meehan Medal: Brent Christie (Eley Park − 17 votes)
- Leading goalkicker: William Dawson (Point Cook − 83 goals)
- Matches played: 76

Westbourne Grammarians won the Division 4 premiership for the first time, defeating Point Cook by 17 points in the grand final to complete a perfect season. It was the club's first-ever senior premiership after its formation in 2014.

This was Chadstone's last year of senior competition until 2024, with the club withdrawing from Division 4 in 2017 and spending seven years in the Club XVIII and Thirds competitions.

=== Ladder ===
Pos	Team	Pld	W	L	D	PF	PA	PP	Pts	Qualification
1	Westbourne Grammarians (P)	16	16	0	0	2492	695	358.6	64	Finals series
2	Point Cook	16	12	4	0	1852	982	188.6	48	Finals series
3	Eley Park	16	11	5	0	1834	1243	147.6	44	Finals series
4	Mt Lilydale	16	10	6	0	1552	1260	123.2	40	Finals series
5	Manningham Cobras	16	8	8	0	1404	1304	107.7	32	
6	North Brunswick	16	7	9	0	1577	1043	151.2	28	
7	Box Hill North	16	5	11	0	1415	1695	83.5	20	
8	Masala	16	3	13	0	1175	2068	56.8	12	
9	Chadstone	16	0	16	0	341	3352	10.2	0	

Rules for classification: 1) points; 2) percentage; 3) number of points for.
(P) Premiers

=== Finals ===
2016 VAFA Division 4 Grand Final
Saturday, 10 September (2:20pm)	Westbourne Grammarians	def.	Point Cook	St Bernard's College
1.2 (8); 4.3 (27); 7.5 (47); 11.6 (72)	Q1; Q2; Q3; Final	4.1 (25); 6.1 (37); 8.4 (52); 8.7 (55)
J. Johns 3, C. Hunter 3, C. Hudson 2, N. Schiano 2, F. Pavez	Goals	W. Dawson 2, S. Young 2, A. Auciello, R. Milne, P. Auciello, M. Herbertson
C. Hudson, A. Imber, T. Rogers, R. Coy, C. Sneddon, D. Morrish	Best	M. Kip, M. Smith, P. Auciello, A. Robinson, P. Kerr, A. Galvin
