= 2018 VAFA season =

118th season of the Victorian Amateur Football Association

- Teams: 70
- Matches played: 658

The 2018 VAFA season was the 118th season of the Victorian Amateur Football Association (VAFA), the largest senior community Australian rules football competition in Victoria. A total of 70 teams participated across seven divisions under a promotion and relegation system.

== Association membership ==
Prior to the start of the season, Point Cook and Old Eltham Collegians left the VAFA to join the Western Football Netball League and Northern Football Netball League respectively.

=== Name changes ===
Brunswick NOBSPC, which had most recently been renamed from NOBs/St Pat's in 2015, changed its name to Brunswick Football Club in October 2017.

== Notable events ==
- VAFA defeated Vic Country under-19s 9.13 (67) to 5.14 (44) in a representative match on 8 July.

== Premier ==
2018 VAFA Premier season
- Teams: 10
- Premiers: St Kevin's
- Minor premiers: St Kevin's
- Wooden spooners: St Bedes/Mentone Tigers
- Best and fairest: Ayce Cordy (University Blues)
- Leading goalkicker: Billy Kanakis (St Kevin's) 60 goals
- Matches played: 94

St Kevin's Old Boys won their second Premier Division premiership in a row, defeating Collegians by 5 points in the Grand Final.

Four members of the St Kevin's premiership side − Lachie Sullivan, Ned Reeves, Tom Jok and Ethan Phillips − have since gone on to play in the Australian Football League (AFL).

Old Scotch and St Bedes/Mentone Tigers were relegated.

=== Ladder ===
Pos	Team	Pld	W	L	D	PF	PA	PP	Pts	Qualification
1	St Kevin's (P)	18	15	3	0	1636	1186	137.9	60	Finals series
2	Collegians	18	14	4	0	1660	1245	133.3	56	Finals series
3	Old Brighton	18	12	6	0	1392	1542	90.3	48	Finals series
4	Old Trinity	18	10	7	1	1367	1375	99.4	42	Finals series
5	University Blues	18	7	10	1	1389	1395	99.6	30	
6	De La Salle	18	7	11	0	1404	1384	101.5	28	
7	Old Xaverians	18	7	11	0	1389	1373	101.8	28	
8	Old Melburnians	18	7	11	0	1147	1506	76.2	28	
9	Old Scotch	18	6	12	0	1366	1420	96.2	24	Relegation
10	St Bedes/Mentone Tigers	18	4	14	0	1294	1618	80.0	16	Relegation

Rules for classification: 1) points; 2) percentage; 3) number of points for.
(P) Premiers

=== Finals ===
	Semi-finals
Saturday, 1 September	St Kevin's 10.7 (67)	def. by	Collegians 11.8 (74)	Elsternwick Park
Sunday, 2 September	Old Brighton 7.15 (57)	def. by	Old Trinity Grammarians 13.19 (97)	Elsternwick Park

	Preliminary final
Sunday, 9 September	St Kevin's 19.12 (126)	def.	Old Trinity Grammarians 9.9 (63)	Elsternwick Park

	Grand Final
Sunday, 16 September	Collegians 11.14 (80)	def. by	St Kevin's 12.13 (85)	Elsternwick Park

== Premier B ==
2018 VAFA Premier B season
- Teams: 10
- Premiers: St Bernard's
- Minor premiers: St Bernard's
- Wooden spooners: Mazenod
- Best and fairest: Chad Jones (St Bernard's)
- Leading goalkicker: Chad Jones (St Bernard's) 105 goals
- Matches played: 94

St Bernard's defeated Old Carey by 83 points in the Grand Final.

AJAX coach Mark Williams, a former Australian Football League (AFL) player and coach, left at the end of the season after the club was relegated.

=== Ladder ===
Pos	Team	Pld	W	L	D	PF	PA	PP	Pts	Qualification
1	St Bernard's (P)	18	16	2	0	2282	937	243.5	64	Finals series
2	Old Carey	18	16	2	0	1868	1078	173.3	64	Finals series
3	University Blacks	18	15	3	0	1999	1145	174.6	60	Finals series
4	Caulfield Grammarians	18	11	7	0	1703	1269	134.2	44	Finals series
5	Beaumaris	18	11	7	0	1494	1278	116.9	44	
6	Parkdale Vultures	18	6	12	0	1190	1668	71.3	24	
7	Old Haileybury	18	5	13	0	1268	1630	77.8	20	
8	Monash Blues	18	4	14	0	990	2032	48.7	16	
9	AJAX	18	3	15	0	1148	1889	60.8	12	Relegation
10	Mazenod	18	3	15	0	874	1890	46.2	12	Relegation

Rules for classification: 1) points; 2) percentage; 3) number of points for.
(P) Premiers

=== Finals ===
	Semi-finals
Saturday, 1 September	St Bernard's 11.10 (76)	def.	Old Carey 6.9 (45)	Box Hill City Oval
Sunday, 2 September	University Blacks 16.11 (107)	def.	Caulfield Grammarians 12.16 (88)	Trevor Barker Oval

	Preliminary final
Saturday, 8 September	Old Carey 12.13 (85)	def.	University Blacks 11.15 (81)	Elsternwick Park

	Grand Final
Saturday, 15 September	St Bernard's 18.15 (123)	def.	Old Carey 5.10 (40)	Elsternwick Park
Both teams promoted to Premier Division

== Premier C ==
2018 VAFA Premier C season
- Teams: 10
- Premiers: Fitzroy
- Minor premiers: Williamstown CYMS
- Wooden spooners: St. Mary's Salesian
- Best and fairest: Yuma Hemphill (Williamstown CYMS)
- Leading goalkicker: Adrian Romanyk (PEGS) 61 goals
- Matches played: 94

Fitzroy won their first senior premiership since the 1944 VFL Grand Final, and their first in the VAFA since merging with the Fitzroy Reds, with a 70-point victory over Williamstown CYMS.

=== Ladder ===
Pos	Team	Pld	W	L	D	PF	PA	PP	Pts	Qualification
1	Williamstown CYMS	18	16	2	0	2032	1070	189.9	64	Finals series
2	Fitzroy (P)	18	15	3	0	1904	1064	179.0	60	Finals series
3	Old Geelong	18	12	6	0	1654	1292	128.0	48	Finals series
4	Old Camberwell	18	11	7	0	1589	1382	115.0	44	Finals series
5	Marcellin	18	9	9	0	1505	1423	105.8	36	
6	Old Ivanhoe	18	7	11	0	1595	1657	96.3	18	
7	Old Mentonians	18	7	11	0	1365	1561	87.4	18	
8	PEGS	18	7	11	0	1245	1463	85.1	18	
9	Old Peninsula	18	5	13	0	1096	1842	59.5	20	Relegation
10	St Mary's Salesian	18	1	17	0	1194	2425	49.2	4	Relegation

Rules for classification: 1) points; 2) percentage; 3) number of points for.
(P) Premiers

=== Finals ===
	Semi-finals
Saturday, 1 September	Williamstown CYMS 9.10 (64)	def. by	Fitzroy 10.7 (67)	Bill Lawry Oval
Sunday, 2 September	Old Geelong 8.16 (64)	def.	Old Camberwell Grammarians 8.9 (57)	Bill Lawry Oval

	Preliminary final
Saturday, 8 September	Williamstown CYMS 9.11 (65)	def. by	Old Geelong 8.18 (66)	Box Hill City Oval

	Grand Final
Saturday, 15 September	Fitzroy 16.11 (107)	def.	Old Geelong 5.7 (37)	Trevor Barker Oval
Both teams were promoted to Premier B

== Division 1 ==
2018 VAFA Division 1 season
- Teams: 10
- Premiers: Ormond
- Minor premiers: Hampton Rovers
- Wooden spooners: Ivanhoe
- Best and fairest: Sean Calcedo (Preston Bullants)
- Leading goalkicker: Aaron Cloke (Oakleigh − 107 goals)
- Matches played: 94

=== Ladder ===
Pos	Team	Pld	W	L	D	PF	PA	PP	Pts	Qualification
1	Hampton Rovers	18	14	3	1	1857	996	186.5	58	Finals series
2	Ormond (P)	18	14	3	1	1833	1234	148.5	58	Finals series
3	Oakleigh	18	12	6	0	1743	1303	133.8	48	Finals series
4	Therry Penola	18	12	6	0	1652	1311	126.0	48	Finals series
5	Prahran Assumption	18	11	7	0	1529	1066	143.4	44	
6	Preston Bullants	18	9	9	0	1556	1450	107.3	36	
7	West Brunswick	18	7	11	0	1282	1499	85.5	28	
8	Kew	18	6	12	0	1241	1458	85.1	24	
9	Brunswick	18	3	15	0	1122	2124	52.8	12	Relegation
10	Ivanhoe	18	1	17	0	893	2267	39.4	4	Relegation

Rules for classification: 1) points; 2) percentage; 3) number of points for.
(P) Premiers

=== Finals ===
	Semi-finals
Saturday, 25 August	Hampton Rovers 9.14 (68)	def. by	Ormond 13.19 (97)	Elsternwick Park
Sunday, 26 August	Oakleigh 15.10 (100)	def.	Therry Penola 13.21 (99)	Bill Lawry Oval

	Preliminary final
Saturday, 1 September	Hampton Rovers 14.11 (95)	def.	Oakleigh 9.8 (62)	Trevor Barker Oval

	Grand Final
Saturday, 8 September	Ormond 11.9 (75)	def.	Hampton Rovers 9.15 (69)	Trevor Barker Oval
Both teams were promoted to Premier C

== Division 2 ==
2018 VAFA Division 2 season
- Teams: 10
- Premiers: UHS-VU
- Minor premiers: UHS-VU
- Wooden spooners: Eltham Collegians
- Best and fairest: Brandon Jackson (UHS-VU)
- Leading goalkicker: Brandon Jackson (UHS-VU) 78 goals
- Matches played: 94

Following the conclusion of the season, in which they finished last, Eltham Collegians left the VAFA and transferred to the Northern Football League.

=== Ladder ===
Pos	Team	Pld	W	L	D	PF	PA	PP	Pts	Qualification
1	UHS-VU (P)	18	17	1	0	2096	1055	198.7	68	Finals series
2	Old Paradians	18	15	3	0	1767	1223	144.4	60	Finals series
3	Whitefriars	18	14	4	0	2013	1077	186.9	56	Finals series
4	Yarra Old Grammarians	18	14	4	0	2051	1402	146.3	56	Finals series
5	MHSOB	18	9	9	0	1533	1448	105.9	36	
6	Bulleen Templestowe	18	5	12	1	1441	1561	92.2	22	
7	St John's	18	5	12	1	1225	1725	71.0	22	
8	Power House	18	5	13	0	1256	1869	67.2	20	
9	Emmaus St Leo's	18	4	14	0	1207	1874	64.4	16	Relegation
10	Eltham Collegians	18	1	17	0	834	2188	38.1	4	Relegation

Rules for classification: 1) points; 2) percentage; 3) number of points for.
(P) Premiers

=== Finals ===
	Semi-finals
Sunday, 26 August	Whitefriars 14.13 (97)	def.	Yarra Old Grammarians 11.11 (77)	Box Hill City Oval
Sunday, 26 August	UHS-VU 12.9 (81)	def.	Old Paradians 9.11 (65)	Coburg City Oval

	Preliminary final
Sunday, 2 September	Old Paradians 12.8 (80)	def.	Whitefriars 8.12 (60)	Highgate Recreation Reserve, Craigieburn

	Grand Final
Sunday, 9 September	UHS-VU 14.17 (101)	def.	Old Paradians 6.10 (46)	Coburg City Oval
Both teams were promoted to Division 1

== Division 3 ==
2018 VAFA Division 3 season
- Teams: 10
- Premiers: Glen Eira
- Minor premiers: Glen Eira
- Wooden spooners: La Trobe University
- Best and fairest: Justin Raiti (Hawthorn)
- Leading goalkicker: Kane Maghamez (Manningham − 56 goals)
- Matches played: 94

=== Ladder ===
Pos	Team	Pld	W	L	D	PF	PA	PP	Pts	Qualification
1	Glen Eira (P)	18	17	1	0	2104	1119	188.0	68	Finals series
2	Hawthorn	18	13	5	0	2164	1414	153.0	52	Finals series
3	Westbourne Grammarians	18	12	6	0	1855	1346	137.8	48	Finals series
4	Aquinas	18	10	8	0	1784	1468	121.5	40	Finals series
5	Manningham Cobras	18	10	8	0	1632	1430	114.1	40	
6	Swinburne University	18	10	8	0	1687	1499	112.5	40	
7	Canterbury	18	9	9	0	1569	1329	118.1	36	
8	Richmond Central	18	7	11	0	1372	1510	90.9	28	
9	Albert Park	18	1	17	0	1000	2185	45.8	4	Relegation
10	La Trobe University	18	1	17	0	773	2640	29.3	4	Relegation

Rules for classification: 1) points; 2) percentage; 3) number of points for.
(P) Premiers

=== Finals ===
	Semi-finals
Saturday, 25 August	Glen Eira 10.9 (69)	def.	Hawthorn 9.14 (68)	Whitefriars College, Donvale
Sunday, 26 August	Westbourne Grammarians 9.25 (79)	def.	Aquinas OC 6.7 (43)	Garvey Oval, Bundoora

	Preliminary final
Saturday, 1 September	Hawthorn 10.16 (76)	def.	Westbourne Grammarians 7.8 (50)	Garvey Oval, Bundoora

	Grand Final
Sunday, 9 September	Glen Eira 10.12 (72)	def.	Hawthorn 8.9 (57)	Trevor Barker Oval
Both teams were promoted to Division 2

== Division 4 ==
2018 VAFA Division 4 season
- Teams: 10
- Premiers: North Brunswick
- Minor premiers: North Brunswick
- Wooden spooners: Masala
- Best and fairest: Marco Creek (Parkside)
- Leading goalkicker: Travis French (South Mornington) 83 goals
- Matches played: 94

Following the conclusion of the season, Mt Lilydale Old Collegians merged with Croydon North to form Croydon North MLOC Football Club, and then transferred to the Eastern Football League.

=== Ladder ===
Pos	Team	Pld	W	L	D	PF	PA	PP	Pts	Qualification
1	North Brunswick (P)	18	16	2	0	2165	1039	208.4	64	Finals series
2	Parkside	18	14	4	0	1933	1000	193.3	56	Finals series
3	St Francis Xavier	18	12	6	0	2014	998	201.8	48	Finals series
4	South Melbourne Districts	18	10	8	0	1566	1529	102.4	40	Finals series
5	South Mornington	18	9	9	0	1617	1619	99.9	36	
6	Elsternwick	18	9	9	0	1660	1670	99.4	36	
7	Eley Park	18	8	10	0	1409	1810	77.9	32	
8	Mt Lilydale	18	5	13	0	1253	1692	74.1	20	
9	Box Hill North	18	5	13	0	1229	1964	62.6	20	
10	Masala	18	2	16	0	843	2368	35.6	8	

Rules for classification: 1) points; 2) percentage; 3) number of points for.
(P) Premiers

=== Finals ===
	Semi-finals
Saturday, 25 August	North Brunswick 14.13 (97)	def.	Parkside 6.13 (49)	Garvey Oval, Bundoora
Sunday, 26 August	St. Francis Xavier OC 12.8 (80)	def.	South Melbourne Districts 7.8 (50)	Waverley Oval, Malvern East

	Preliminary final
Saturday, 1 September	Parkside 15.5 (95)	def.	St. Francis Xavier OC 4.6 (30)	Whitefriars College, Donvale

	Grand Final
Saturday, 8 September	North Brunswick 15.11 (101)	def.	Parkside 9.11 (65)	Garvey Oval, Bundoora
Both teams were promoted to Division 3

== Minor grades ==
Reserves, thirds and under-19s competitions were all held alongside the seniors.

=== Reserves ===
Division	Premiers		Runners-up		Venue	Date
Division	Club	Score	Club	Score	Venue	Date
Premier	Old Xaverians	6.8 (44)	Old Melburnians	12.7 (79)	Elsternwick Park	16 September 2018
Premier B	Beaumaris	12.9 (81)	University Blacks	4.10 (34)	Elsternwick Park	15 September 2018
Premier C	Fitzroy	6.6 (42)	Old Geelong	3.9 (33)	Trevor Barker Beach Oval	15 September 2018
Division 1	Ormond	15.10 (100)	Hampton Rovers	10.13 (73)	Trevor Barker Beach Oval	8 September 2018
Division 2	Whitefriars	9.13 (67)	MHSOB	6.9 (45)	Coburg City Oval	9 September 2018
Division 3	Hawthorn	7.13 (55)	Glen Eira	4.9 (33)	Trevor Barker Beach Oval	9 September 2018
Division 4	North Brunswick	9.8 (62)	Parkside	9.6 (60)	Garvey Oval	8 September 2018

=== Thirds ===
Division	Premiers		Runners-up		Venue	Date
Division	Club	Score	Club	Score	Venue	Date
Premier	St Kevin's Gold	10.22 (82)	Old Melburnians	5.2 (32)	Elsternwick Park	16 September 2018
Section 2	De La Salle	8.12 (60)	Beaumaris	6.5 (41)	Elsternwick Park	26 August 2018
Section 3	St Bernard's	10.8 (68)	Old Carey	8.10 (58)	Coburg City Oval	26 August 2018
Section 4	Hawthorn	10.11 (71)	MHSOB Maroon	3.10 (28)	Box Hill City Oval	26 August 2018
Section 5	Monash Blues	11.2 (68)	Kew	6.7 (43)	Bill Lawry Oval	26 August 2018

=== Under-19s ===
Division	Premiers		Runners-up		Venue	Date
Division	Club	Score	Club	Score	Venue	Date
Premier	Old Xaverians	9.8 (62)	Old Scotch	7.11 (53)	Box Hill City Oval	9 September 2018
Premier Reserves	Old Xaverians 2	11.9 (75)	St Kevin's	6.11 (47)	Box Hill City Oval	9 September 2018
Section 2	Old Carey	12.12 (84)	Williamstown CYMS	9.12 (66)	Box Hill City Oval	8 September 2018
Section 3	Old Brighton	12.6 (78)	Mazenod	7.12 (54)	Trevor Barker Beach Oval	8 September 2018
Section 4	Glen Eira	12.9 (81)	PEGS	10.8 (68)	Trevor Barker Beach Oval	9 September 2018
Section 5	Aquinas	14.12 (96)	De La Salle	8.10 (58)	Garvey Oval	8 September 2018
