= Masala Dandenong Football Club =

Names
- Full name: Masala Dandenong Football Club
- Former name: Masala Football Club (2012−2019)
- Nickname: Tigers
- Club song: "Oh We're From Masala"

Club details
- Founded: August 2012; 13 years ago
- Colours: Yellow Black
- Competition: VAFA: Thirds
- President: William Bolch
- Coach: Adam Lagerewskij
- Ground: Lois Twohig Reserve, Dandenong North

Uniforms
Home	Practice games (2013)

Other information
- Official website: masalafc.com.au

The Masala Dandenong Football Club, nicknamed the Tigers, is an Australian rules football club based in the Melbourne suburb of Dandenong North. The club seeks to support and promote football in multicultural communities.

As of 2025, the club competes in the Victorian Amateur Football Association (VAFA) Thirds competition, fielding one team in Division 2 and another team in Division 5.

== History ==
=== Formation and early years ===
Masala Football Club was formed in August 2012 as the brainchild of Ash Nugent, who had served as Team Manager of the Indian Tigers at the 2011 Australian Football International Cup. Nugent said that he and the club's other founders considered names including "Tendulkar Tigers" to "Brown Brothers Football Club", but "found the names to be either too exclusive (often India-centric), infringing on existing brands or simply impossible to work with".

Eventually, "Masala" (meaning a blend of spices) was chosen as the club's name. The club chose not to have a nickname, and instead created a logo based on a star anise, in which the seeds were replaced by footballs.

The Richmond Football Club, a supporter of the Indian Tigers, also chose to support Masala, providing the club's jumper and colours.

In October 2012, the VAFA admitted Masala into Club XVIII Section 3 for the 2013 season. Practice games were played in early 2013 against Team Africa, Dragons, Endeavour Hills and Dandenong, and Richmond players Matt White and Orren Stephenson presented Masala players with their guernseys on 5 April 2013.

The club played its first official VAFA game on 13 April 2013, a 131-point loss to Richmond Central, the eventual premiers of the section in 2013.

Masala's first victory came in round 8 against Dragons, another multiculturalism-based club, with a 12-point victory in wet conditions. The club had lost to the Dragons by 82 points in round 2, although that win was later awarded to Masala after it was found that the Dragons had fielded unregistered players.

Although they finished last in 2013, the club moved up to Club XVIII Section 1 for the 2014 season. They again finished last, with their only victory coming against Old Geelong in round 11.

=== VAFA seniors ===
In 2015, Masala became a senior club, entering a senior and reserves side in Division 4. The club's first senior victory was a 26-point defeat of Chadstone in round 1.

For its initial seasons, Masala co-shared BJ Powell Reserve in Noble Park North with the Lyndale Football Club. They eventually moved to their own ground at WJ Powell Reserve, before relocating to Fotheringham Reserve in 2018. In 2020, the club again relocated to Lois Twohig Reserve in Dandenong North.

On 11 February 2019, the club was renamed to the Masala Dandenong Football Club in order to bring it closer to the Dandenong community.

In 2022, Masala Dandenong introduced a junior football program with the North Dandenong Masala Junior Football Club entering the South East Junior Football League (SEJFL). The new team revived the historical North Dandenong Junior Football Club, which dissolved in 2018.

=== Withdrawal from seniors ===
At the end of the 2023 season, Division 4 was abolished by the VAFA and Masala Dandenong was moved to an expanded Division 3 for 2024.

Because of extremely low player numbers during pre-season training, on 12 January 2024, following a unanimous vote from the club's committee, club president William Bolch announced Masala Dandenong would withdraw from Division 3.

Following the announcement, the club chose to enter the VAFA Thirds competition, fielding one team in Division 2 North and another team in Division 3 South in the 2024 Season.

== Honours ==
=== Team of the Decade (2012−2022) ===
A "Team of the Decade" was announced in 2022 on the 10-year anniversary of the club's formation.

Back	Stephen Daw	Daniel Hoffman	Ben Nugen (captain)
Half-Back	Matt Decarne	Nicholas Cunningham	Jaryd Coghill
Centre	Declan Lee	Brandon Kelly	Vishnu Rishie
Half Forward	Anthony Dorrington	Sam Freeman (vice-captain)	Anthony Morabito
Forward	Jana Kumaralingam	Declan Fowler	Jordan Toikalkin
Followers	Dale Lawrence	Josh Kyle	Tom Williamson
Interchange	Zac Kelly	David Crkvenac	Wayne McMahon
Interchange	Luke Decarne		
Coach	Adam Lagerewskij		
President	Ash Nugent		

=== Club Presidents ===
Below are a list of club presidents of the Masala Dandenong Football Club:

Name	Presidential Tenure
Ash Nugent	2013-2014
Matthew Jacobs	2015
Tarak Shah	2016-2018
Wayne McMahon	2019
Lucy McMahon	2020-2021
Matthew Decarne	2022-2023 (June)
Cameron Young	2023 (July) - 2023 (November)
William Bolch	2023 (December) - Present

=== Masala Award ===
The Masala Award is presented to the Club Person Of The Year and is awarded at the end of season Presentation Night. Past Masala Award recipients include:

Masala Award Winners
Year	Name	Year	Name
2013	Learnmore Moyo	2014	Rian Prestwitch
2015	Cassie Jacobs	2016	
2017	Wayne Chaplin	2018	Scott Becker
2019	Janahan Kumaralingam	2020	N/A
2021	Jan Williams	2022	William Bolch
2023	Hayley Lagerewskij	2024	Flynn Cassar
2025	Scott Grant		

== Seasons ==
Premiers	Grand Finalist	Minor premiers	Finals appearance	Wooden spoon

=== Seniors ===
Year	Division	Finish	W	L	D	Coach	Captain	Best and fairest	Leading goalkicker		Ref
2013	XVIII S3	6th	2	13	0	Matt Peddlesden	Ben Nugent	Ben Nugent	Prakash Kailasanathan	21	
2014	XVIII S1	6th	1	14	0	Vishnu Rishie	Ben Nugent	Sam Freeman	Sam Freeman	20	
2015	Division 4	10th	2	14	0	Brett Robinson	Ben Nugent	Zachary Kelly			
2016	Division 4	8th	3	13	0	Brett Robinson	Ben Nugent	Nicholas Cunningham			
2017	Division 4	8th	2	13	1	Brett Robinson	Sam Freeman; Brandon Kelly	Brandon Kelly	Sam Freeman	44	
2018	Division 4	10th	2	16	0	Alan Sutherland	Sam Freeman	Dale Gibb	Sam Freeman		
2019	Division 4	7th	4	12	0	Alan Sutherland	Sam Freeman	Brandon Kelly	Benjamin Abraham	24	
2020	Division 4	(No season)						(No season)			
2021	Division 4	6th	4	7	0	Adam Lagerewskij	Daniel Hoffman	Brandon Kelly	Declan Fowler	40	
2022	Division 4	4th	7	9	0	Adam Lagerewskij	Brandon Kelly	Tom Williamson	Declan Fowler	64	
2023	Division 4	5th	7	11	0	Adam Lagerewskij	Brandon Kelly	Dave Velardo	Brandon Kelly	30	
2024	Thirds D2 Nth	4th	8	8	0	Adam Lagerewskij	Flynn Cassar; Jordan Gibbon	Deakin Harris	Zac Pahos	27	
2025	Thirds D2	10th	4	12	0	Adam Lagerewskij	Flynn Cassar	Jordan Gibbon	Zac Pahos	22	

=== Reserves ===
Year	Division	Finish	W	L	D	Coach	Captain	Best and fairest	Leading goalkicker		Ref
2015	Division 4	11th	1	15	0	Prakash Kailasanathan					
2016	Division 4	9th	0	16	0	Brent Shaw					
2017	Division 4	9th	1	15	0	Nick Boyd		Tarak Shah	Adam Gleeson	7	
2018	Division 4	10th	2	16	0	Enrico Misso		Anthony Morabito	Jaryd Coghill	14	
2019	Division 4	9th	2	14	0	Adam Lagerewskij		David Crkvenac	Will Dimopoulos	11	
2020	Division 4	(No season)						(No season)			
2021	Division 4	8th	0	10	1	Luke Johnson		Sahil Grewal; Raam Gowriswaran	Zac Pahos	7	
2022	Division 4	3rd	9	7	0	Luke Johnson	Jana Kumaralingam; Raam Gowriswaran	Deakin Harris	Tom Edwards	16	
2023	Division 4	5th	4	12	0	Luke Johnson		Jeremy Hallett	Jeremy Hallett	16	
2024	Thirds D3 Sth	10th	0	16	0	Adam Lagerewskij	Jason Dick	Hayden Ellis	Matthew Visintin	7	
2025	Thirds D5	10th	3	11	0	Rodney Ellis	Hayden Ellis, Nabil Hussain, Sam Kennedy, Jasper Roberts, Jason Pietrosanto	Ricky Taweel	Josh Ellis	7	
