= Ian Aitken =

Ian Aitken may refer to:

- Ian Aitken (journalist) (1927–2018), British journalist and political commentator
- Ian Aitken (footballer) (born 1967), former Australian rules footballer
