= Ian Aitken (footballer) =

Australian rules footballer

Personal information
- Born: 16 May 1967 (age 59)
- Original team: Strathmore
- Height: 192 cm (6 ft 4 in)
- Weight: 91 kg (201 lb)

Playing career^{1}
Years	Club	Games (Goals)
1987–1992	Carlton	61 (10)
1993	St Kilda	5 (0)
Total		66 (10)
- ^{1} Playing statistics correct to the end of 1993.

Career highlights
- VFL premiership player: 1987

Ian "Beaser" Aitken (born 16 May 1967) is a former Australian rules footballer who played for Carlton and St Kilda in the Victorian Football League (VFL).

== Career ==
Aitken was a strongly built and pacy defender, winning the Rookie of the Year award in his debut season in 1987. He was also a premiership player that year. He moved to St Kilda for the 1993 season but only managed 5 games.

He was the founder of Vic Cric in 1993, a program for young children learning skills in cricket and how to play the game. Aitken was also the founder of Vic Footy, an Australian Rules Football program similar to Vic Cricket.

=== Coaching ===
In 1994 Aitken coached Phillip Island in the Bass Valley Football League as a player/coach. With other high-profile recruit, David Saker (Victorian cricketer), Phillip Island finished the season on top of the ladder and after a dominant performance in the finals went straight into the grand final as hot favourite. However the Wonthaggi Rovers came from over 6 goals down at half time to win by 2 points. Aitken left the club after the shock loss. (In 2011, Aitken was appointed senior coach of Kew Football Club in the Victorian Amateur Football Association (VAFA). He led the club to a three-peat in 2013, 2014 and 2015, before leaving at the end of the 2016 season. Aitken returned in 2019 and remained in the role until the end of the 2023 season.

In August 2021, a player from Richmond Central Football Club recorded Kew players training (against COVID-19 lockdown rules) at Richmond Central's home ground, Kevin Bartlett Oval. Aitken was involved in a verbal confrontation, telling the player to "fuck off", and a Kew player was seen trying to push Aitken away from the confrontation. Kew said it did not sanction the training session, and the VAFA did not sanction the club, however they did refer Aitken to AFL Victoria.

Aitken has also previously served coach of Yarra Junior Football League (VJFL) clubs Kew Colts and Kew Rovers.
