= Alan Miller (coach) =

Australian footballer and coach

Personal information
- Full name: Alan Thomas Miller
- Born: 1 June 1925; Colac, Victoria
- Died: 9 September 2000 (aged 75); Melbourne, Victoria
- Original team: South Melbourne Districts (VAFA)

Coaching career
Years	Club	Games (W–L–D)
1967–1968	South Melbourne	38 (11–25–2)

Alan Thomas Miller (1 June 1925 – 9 September 2000) was an Australian rules football coach in the Victorian Football League (VFL). He was senior coach of South Melbourne in 1967 and 1968, one of only a few people who have coached a VFL/AFL club without having been a player in the league.

Miller, who was born in Colac, served with the Royal Australian Navy during World War II. He played amateur football with South Melbourne Districts, then in 1953 and 1954 coached Albert Park in the Melbourne Amateur Sunday Football Association. After steering Albert Park to a premiership in 1954, Miller was coach of the South Melbourne thirds (Under 19s). In Miller's seven years as coach, from 1955 to 1961, South Melbourne finished in the top five every season and won a premiership in 1956. Over the next few years he was a co-ordinating coach for South Melbourne and served on the committee, before returning to the Under 19s for another season in 1966. In November that year he was named as the new senior coach of South Melbourne, to replace Bob Skilton, who had stepped down from the position, but remained with the side as a player.

Described as a "strict disciplinarian and a good tactician", Miller had a good start to his VFL coaching career, with South Melbourne securing three wins in the opening four rounds of the 1967 season. In round eight, South Melbourne defeated reigning premiers St Kilda by 29 points at Lake Oval, but they won only one more game for the rest of the season and finished in ninth position. South Melbourne were also ninth-place finishers in the 1968 VFL season, with six wins.

He resigned on 1 October 1968, citing the increasing demands on his time, as he also worked as an executive officer at the Australian Broadcasting Control Board. In 1967 he had suffered nervous exhaustion during South Melbourne's round 13 loss to Fitzroy and coaching was transferred to assistant coach Ken Boyd for the remainder of that game.

Miller died on 9 September 2000, at The Alfred Hospital in Melbourne.
