= Tom Downie =

Australian rules footballer

Personal information
- Full name: Thomas Downie
- Born: 27 April 1993 (age 33)
- Original team: North Ballarat Rebels (TAC Cup)
- Draft: No. 56, 2011 national draft
- Height: 203 cm (6 ft 8 in)
- Weight: 95 kg (209 lb)
- Position: Ruckman

Playing career^{1}
Years	Club	Games (Goals)
2012–2017	Greater Western Sydney	9 (2)
- ^{1} Playing statistics correct to the end of 2017.

Tom Downie (born 27 April 1993) is a former professional Australian rules footballer who played for the Greater Western Sydney Giants in the Australian Football League (AFL). A ruckman standing 203 centimetres (6 ft 8 in), he was recruited by the club in the 2011 national draft with the 56th pick overall. Downie made his debut in round 20, 2013 against Fremantle at Subiaco Oval. He played a total of nine AFL games—one in 2013, seven in 2015, and one in 2016—before announcing his retirement in May 2017 in order to deal with mental health issues.

== Early life ==
Before he started his professional football career, Downie played for Australia in the under-17 basketball world championships in 2010. He switched focus to football and played two games for the North Ballarat Rebels in the TAC Cup in 2011, showing potential as a ruckman but needing time to develop into a stronger AFL player. He was drafted by Greater Western Sydney with the 56th pick in the 2011 national draft.

== Career ==
Downie was inconsistent in 2012, playing for Greater Western Sydney's reserves side in the North East Australian Football League. He went into 2013 out of contract and in doubt over whether he'd be at the club any longer, but he improved his form and earned both an AFL debut in round 20 against Fremantle and a contract extension. In 2014 his contract was again extended, keeping him at the Giants until at least the end of 2016.

Through the rest of Downie's career, he was only ever used in the AFL as a replacement ruckman for when Shane Mumford was injured. His inexperience at the top level showed and, in general, the Giants suffered when Mumford wasn't available. Downie had been suffering from anxiety and taking medication for it, but in 2016 he decided to wean himself off of it, thinking that he had recovered and no longer needed it. In a pre-season game in 2017 Downie walked off the ground having a severe panic attack. Due to a struggle with anxiety, he was then moved to Greater Western Sydney's long-term injury list before deciding to leave football altogether.

Downie made a comeback to football in 2019, joining the Old Scotch Football Club in the Victorian Amateur Football Association (VAFA). He was awarded the GT Moore Medal for the best and fairest player in Premier B, finishing with 27 votes.

He was then recruited by VFL team Williamstown and, up until the end of 2022, has played 22 games and kicked 6 goals, winning the Gerry Callahan Medal for the best and fairest player for Williamstown in 2022 and making the VFL Team-of-the-Year.

== Personal life ==
After quitting the AFL, Downie went through a "very dark time", but he recovered and went on to work with trouble children at his local Police Citizens Youth Club and encourage men suffering from poor mental health to speak out.

== Statistics ==
Statistics are correct to the end of the 2017 season

Legend
G	Goals	K	Kicks	D	Disposals	T	Tackles
B	Behinds	H	Handballs	M	Marks	H/O	Hit-outs

Season	Team	No.	Games	Totals								Averages (per game)							
Season	Team	No.	Games	G	B	K	H	D	M	T	H/O	G	B	K	H	D	M	T	H/O
2013	Greater Western Sydney	44	1	0	0	3	1	4	1	5	2	0.0	0.0	3.0	1.0	4.0	1.0	5.0	2.0
2015	Greater Western Sydney	44	7	2	0	15	30	45	18	26	154	0.3	0.0	2.1	4.3	6.4	2.6	3.7	22.0
2016	Greater Western Sydney	44	1	0	0	2	3	5	2	2	20	0.0	0.0	2.0	3.0	5.0	2.0	2.0	20.0
Career			9	2	0	20	34	54	21	33	176	0.2	0.0	2.2	3.8	6.0	2.3	3.7	19.6
