= Michael Roberts (footballer) =

Australian rules footballer, born 1959

Personal information
- Full name: Michael Roberts
- Born: 27 July 1959 (age 67)
- Original team: Beaumaris
- Height: 180 cm (5 ft 11 in)
- Weight: 82 kg (181 lb)

Playing career^{1}
Years	Club	Games (Goals)
1978–1985	St Kilda	77 (45)
1986	Richmond	12 (4)
1987	Fitzroy	2 (1)
Total		91 (50)
- ^{1} Playing statistics correct to the end of 1987.

Michael Roberts (born 27 July 1959) is a former Australian rules footballer and now television sports journalist and reporter with the Nine Network and Triple M.

== Football career ==
Roberts was recruited from Beaumaris and Melbourne High, and is the son of former St Kilda Football Club great Neil Roberts. He made his debut with St Kilda in 1978, and went on to play 77 games and kick 45 goals until 1985. He then moved to the Richmond Football Club for one season in 1986, playing 12 games and 4 goals. He made his final move to the Fitzroy Football Club for 1987, where he played 2 games and 1 goal. Roberts also represented Victoria in 1981. After a long run of injuries, including stress fractures to his ankles and a knee reconstruction following a ruptured ACL, Roberts was forced to retire from football in 1988.

== Media career ==
Following his retirement from football, Roberts became a respected commentator for the Nine Network. He was a regular sports reporter for National Nine News, as well as appearing as a boundary rider during the Nine Network's Australian Football League telecasts. Roberts also worked as a model on the television quiz show Sale of the Century.

He can also be heard on Triple M's football coverage as a boundary rider on Saturday Nights and Sundays.

== Family ==
Roberts has three daughters with wife Andrea; Charlotte, Amelia and Phoebe.
