= Tallangatta Football Club =

Names
- Full name: Tallangatta Football Netball Club
- Nickname: Hoppers

2026 season
- After finals: Preliminary final
- Home-and-away season: 4th of 12
- Leading goalkicker: Kaine Parsons

Club details
- Founded: 1885; 141 years ago
- Colours: Green Gold
- Competition: Tallangatta & District Football League
- Chairperson: John Maddock
- Coach: Richard Lamb
- Captain: Conor McDowell
- Ground: Rowen Park, Tallangatta

Uniforms
Home	Away

Other information
- Official website: Tallangatta FNC website

The Tallangatta Football Netball Club, nicknamed the Hoppers, is an Australian rules football and netball club based in Tallangatta, Victoria. It plays in the Tallangatta & District Football League (TDFL), of which it was a founding member in 1945.

== History ==
The Tallangatta Football Club was formed in 1885.

In 1944, Tallangatta FC played in the Mitta Valley Patriotic Football Association, just prior to being one of the founding clubs in the Tallangatta & District Football League in 1945. Tallangatta finished the first season on top of the ladder and defeated Fernvale in the league's first grand final.

In 1978 the Tallangatta and Bullioh football clubs merged to become the Tallangatta Valley Football Club, which later dropped the word "Valley" from its name.

In round 6 of the 2015 season Tallangatta broke the league record for the highest score in a match, scoring 49.23 (317) to defeat the Wodonga Saints 2.5 (17) at Bethanga. The previous record, 45.30 (300), had been set by Kiewa-Sandy Creek against Mt Beauty in 1975.

Tallangatta had finished last in 2014, but won the 2015 premiership against reigning premier Kiewa-Sandy Creek. The grand final was drawn at 10.8 (68) to 8.20 (68), and Tallangatta won by one point after extra time. In 2026, under coach Richard Lamb, the club finished fourth and played in the finals for the first time since 2019, beating Chiltern and Yackandandah before losing the preliminary final to Barnawartha.

== Football Premierships ==
Senior

- Craven Trophy
  - 1893
- Mitta Mitta Football Association (Crawford Cup)
  - 1906
- The Fagan McKay Trophy
  - 1909 - Tallangatta Valley
- Mitta Valley Football Association (Blanchfield Trophy)
  - 1911 - Tallangatta Valley: 4.13 - 37 d Mitta Mitta: 4.3 - 27
  - 1913 - Tallangatta: 5.8 - 38 d Eskdale: 2.7 - 19
- Kiewa & District Football Association
  - 1920 - Tallangatta: 7.13 - 55 defeated Kiewa: 2.4 - 16
- Tallangatta & District Football Association
  - 1922 - Tallangatta: 9.8 - 62 defeated Bethanga: 3.5 - 23
- Kiewa & District Football Association
  - 1925 - Tallangatta: 13.10 - 88 defeated Allan's Flat: 8.9 - 57
- Dederang & District Football Association
  - 1939 - Tallangatta: 6.12 - 48 defeated Kiewa: 2.9 - 21
- Tallangatta & District Football League (Tallangatta Magpies: 1945–1977)
  - 1945 - Tallangatta: 4 7 31 defeated Fernvale: 2 9 21
  - 1949 - Tallangatta: 8 8 56 defeated Bullioh Valley: 7 6 48
  - 1954 - Tallangatta: 13 13 91 defeated Kiewa: 8 9 57
  - 1974 - Tallangatta: 10 9 69 defeated Lavington: 9 10 64
- Tallangatta & District Football League (Tallangatta Valley Hoppers / Tallangatta Hoppers: 1978–present)
  - 1979 Tallangatta Valley 12 15 87 Defeated Kiewa Sandy Creek 10 7 67
  - 1980 Tallangatta Valley 20 10 130 Defeated Wodonga Demons 13 11 89
  - 1989 Tallangatta Valley 13 13 91 Defeated Holbrook 8 12 60
  - 1994 Tallangatta Valley 19 17 131 Defeated Kiewa Sandy Creek 10 18 78
  - 1997 Tallangatta Valley 15 10 100 Defeated Mitta United 7 15 57
  - 1998 Tallangatta Valley 10 16 76 Defeated Dederang Mt Beauty 4 4 28
  - 2009 Tallangatta 13 10 88 Defeated Beechworth 8 15 63
  - 2015 Tallangatta 10 8 68 Drew with Kiewa Sandy Creek 8 20 68
    - 2015 - After Extra Time: Tallangatta 11 10 76 Defeated Kiewa Sandy Creek 9 21 75

== Netball Premiership ==
Tallangatta & District Football Netball League

- A. Grade
  - 1993, 2018
- B. Grade
  - 1991, 1992, 1996, 1997, 2022
- C. Grade
  - Nil
- D. Grade / 18 & Under
  - 1996
- E. Grade / 15 & Under
  - 1994, 2021(1st)
- F. Grade / 13 & Under
  - 1992, 1993, 1998
