= Preston Bullants Amateur Football Club =

Preston Bullants

Names
- Full name: Preston Bullants Amateur Football Club
- Former name(s): Northern Bullants (2008−2012); Northern Blues Amateur Football Club (2012−2016)
- Nickname(s): Bullants, Ants
- Former nickname: Blues

2023 season
- Home-and-away season: VAFA: 11th VAFAW: 3rd

Club details
- Founded: Late 2008; 18 years ago
- Colours: Red White
- Competition: VAFA: Division 1 VAFAW: Division 3
- Coach: VAFA: Tom Hill; VAFAW: Shannon Gore
- Captain(s): VAFA: Tom Hill; VAFAW: Brenna Edsell
- Premierships: VAFA (4): 2013; 2014; 2016; 2019; VAFAW (1): 2019
- Ground: W.R. Ruthven Reserve

Uniforms
Home

Other information
- Official website: prestonbullantsafc.com

The Preston Bullants Amateur Football Club (Preston AFC or PBAFC), formerly known as the Northern Bullants and later the Northern Blues, is an Australian rules football club based in the Melbourne suburb of Preston.

Preston is a separate entity to the Northern Bullants, a club in the Victorian Football League (VFL), however the two clubs share a logo and maintain close links. Preston is also linked to the Preston Bullants Junior Football Club (PBJFC), which competes in the Yarra Junior Football League (YJFL).

The club's men's team currently competes in Division 1 of the Victorian Amateur Football Association (VAFA), while the women's team is currently in Division 3 of the VAFA Women's competition.

== History ==
In late 2008, following a YJFL Colts premiership, a number of parents of junior players at PBJFC announced the formation of a new senior club − known as the Northern Bullants − to allow a pathway for players once they passed the junior football age. The club joined the VAFA for the 2009 season in Division 1 of the under-18s competition. However, the team folded at the end of the 2010 season.

The club resumed playing in 2011, fielding an under-19s team in Division 3. That team continued in 2012 alongside a new team in the Premier B Thirds competition. The club was also renamed to the Northern Blues, although it retained its red and white colours.

On 30 October 2012, the VAFA announced the Blues would field a senior team for the first time in 2013, entering Division 4. The club defeated Eley Park in the Grand Final later that year, and was promoted to Division 3 for 2014, where they went back-to-back with a premiership over Richmond Central.

In 2016, the club was renamed to the Preston Bullants and defeated St John's in the Division 2 grand final.

Preston introduced a women's team in 2018, coached by former Darebin mayor Vince Fontana. The women's team won the Division 3 Grand Final in 2019, and the men's team won the Division 1 Grand Final the same year.

The Bullants did not win a game in the 2021 season, which was abandoned due to the COVID-19 pandemic, however the club declined relegation. At the end of the season, inaugural coach George Wakim stepped down and was replaced by under-19s coach George Cotsonis. The club's first win in 931 days came in round 1 of the 2022 season against UHS-VU, the club they defeated in the 2019 grand final. However, this would be Preston's only win in 2022, and the club would be relegated to Division 1 for the 2023 season.

Cotsonis departed as senior coach in June 2023, and was replaced by Tom Hill, a former Greater Western Sydney and Western Bulldogs-listed player. The club ultimately avoided relegation for the 2024 season as part of the VAFA's aim to keep all divisions at 10 teams each.

=== VFL links ===
Although they are separate entities, Preston AFC maintains close links with the Northern Bullants, who compete as a standalone side in the VFL. Both clubs use the same logo, colours and jumper design, and the Northern Bullants were also known as the Northern Blues from 2012 until 2020.

A number of players have played for both Preston AFC and the Northern Bullants, including many who played for the Northern Bullants in the VFL Development League before that competition was disbanded in 2017.

In 2022, Preston AFC became the first VAFA club to play a curtain-raiser for a VFL club, with the senior women's side hosting Parkside at Preston City Oval before the VFL game between the Northern Bullants and Carlton.

== Seasons ==
Premiers	Grand Finalist	Minor premiers	Finals appearance	Wooden spoon

=== Men's ===
==== Seniors ====
Year	Division	Finish	W	L	D	Coach	Captain	Best and fairest	Leading goalkicker		Ref
2013	Division 4	6th	8	8	0	George Wakim	Todd Beames; Dean Calcedo				
2014	Division 3	1st	14	4	0	George Wakim	Todd Beames; Dean Calcedo		Damon Marcon	58	
2015	Division 2	4th	12	6	0	George Wakim		Dean Calcedo	Lachlan McRedmond	61	
2016	Division 2	3rd	13	3	0	George Wakim	Jay Phelan		Damon Marcon	37	
2017	Division 1	5th	11	7	0	George Wakim					
2018	Division 1	6th	9	9	0	George Wakim			Conor Howard	23	
2019	Division 1	1st	13	4	1	George Wakim	Sean Calcedo		Jack Sammartino	50	
2020	Premier C	(No season)				George Wakim	Sean Calcedo	(No season)			
2021	Premier C	10th	0	11	0	George Wakim	Sean Calcedo	Patrick Vanin	Jackson Curic	22	
2022	Premier C	11th	1	19	0	George Cotsonis	James King	Rory Howard	Ethan Lowe	22	
2023	Division 1	9th	3	15	0	George Cotsonis; Tom Hill	James King		Paddy Davies	27	
2024	Division 1	7th	7	10	1	Tom Hill	Tom Hill		Alex Johnston	28	

=== Women's ===
==== Seniors ====
Year	Division	Finish	W	L	D	Coach	Captain	Best and fairest	Leading goalkicker		Ref
2018	Division 3	1st	11	3	0	Vince Fontana	Binny Grainger	Jacara Egan	Jacara Egan	14	
2019	Division 3	2nd	12	2	0	Vince Fontana			Melanie Cook	20	
2020	Division 2	(No season)				Doug Hamilton		(No season)			
2021	Division 3	7th	1	9	0	Doug Hamilton	Kaitlin Pike	Kaitlin Pike			
2022	Division 3	6th	6	8	0	Doug Hamilton	Binny Grainger; Shannon Gore		Shannon Gore	10	
2023	Division 4	3rd	7	7	1	Siobhan O'Dwyer			Shannon Gore	19	
2024	Division 3	9th	4	12	0	Shannon Gore	Brenna Edsell				
