= Ethan Phillips (footballer) =

Australian rules footballer (born 1999)

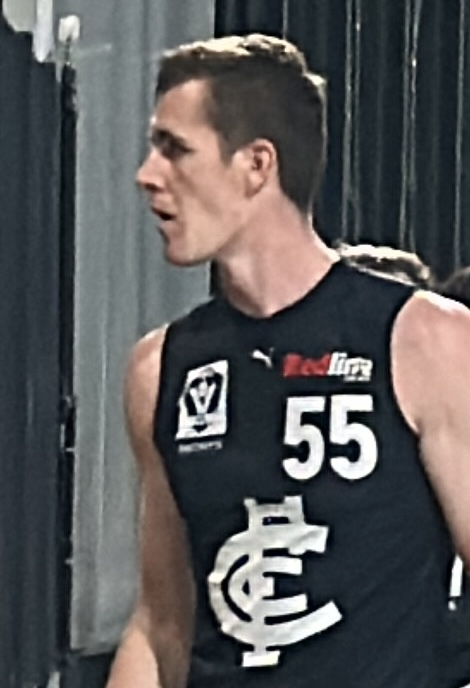
- Phillips with Carlton (VFL) in March 2025

Personal information
- Full name: Ethan Phillips
- Born: 17 July 1999 (age 27)
- Original team: Oakleigh Chargers
- Debut: 20 May 2024, Hawthorn vs. Port Adelaide, at Adelaide Oval
- Height: 197 cm (6 ft 6 in)
- Weight: 90 kg (198 lb)
- Position: Key defender

Playing career
Years	Club	Games (Goals)
2024	Hawthorn	1 (0)

Career highlights
- Fothergill–Round–Mitchell Medal: 2022

Ethan Phillips (born 17 July 1999) is an Australian rules footballer who played for the Hawthorn Football Club in the Australian Football League (AFL).

== Career ==
Phillips joined the Oakleigh Chargers in the TAC Cup in 2016 and stayed with the club in 2017.

In 2018, he joined Port Melbourne in the Victorian Football League (VFL), playing in 15 games and avering 11.5 intercept possessions. The same year, he also played for St Kevin's Old Boys in the Victorian Amateur Football Association in the club's premiership-winning team.

In 2022, Phillips was awarded the Fothergill–Round–Mitchell Medal as the most promising young talent in the VFL. He averaged 17.3 disposals in his 18 games for Port Melbourne in 2023.

Ahead of the 2024 VFL season, Phillips joined Box Hill in December 2023.

=== AFL ===
Hawthorn signed Phillips to its rookie list in the 2024 pre-season supplemental selection period (SSP). Phillips was signed after Hawthorn defender James Blanck suffered an ACL injury, which meant he would miss the entire 2024 AFL season.

Phillips continued to play in the VFL for Box Hill at the start of the 2024 season. He played his sole AFL match in round 10 against Port Adelaide, and was delisted at the end of the season.

=== Post-AFL ===
Following his delisting, Phillips joined Carlton's reserves team in the VFL. He won the team's best and fairest award in 2025.

== Statistics ==
Legend
G	Goals	K	Kicks	D	Disposals	T	Tackles
B	Behinds	H	Handballs	M	Marks

Season	Team	No.	Games	Totals							Averages (per game)							Votes
Season	Team	No.	Games	G	B	K	H	D	M	T	G	B	K	H	D	M	T	Votes
2024	Hawthorn	37	1	0	0	6	4	10	3	1	0.0	0.0	6.0	4.0	10.0	3.0	1.0	0
Career			1	0	0	6	4	10	3	1	0.0	0.0	6.0	4.0	10.0	3.0	1.0	0

== Honours and achievements ==
Hawthorn

- McClelland Trophy: 2024
