= Josh Dolan (footballer) =

Australian rules footballer

Personal information
- Born: 11 November 2006 (age 19)
- Original teams: Sandringham Dragons (Talent League); Beaumaris (VAFA); Brighton Grammar (APS)
- Draft: No. 31, 2024 national draft
- Debut: Round 1, 2025, Western Bulldogs vs. North Melbourne, at Docklands Stadium
- Height: 177 cm (5 ft 10 in)
- Weight: 71 kg (157 lb)
- Position: Forward

Club information
- Current club: Western Bulldogs
- Number: 26

Playing career^{1}
Years	Club	Games (Goals)
2025–	Western Bulldogs	20 (5)
- ^{1} Playing statistics correct to the end of round 22, 2026.

Josh Dolan (born 11 November 2006) is a professional Australian rules footballer who plays for the Western Bulldogs in the Australian Football League (AFL).

== Early life ==
Dolan was educated at Brighton Grammar School and represented them in the Associated Public Schools of Victoria (APS) football competition, where he won a premiership in 2024. He also played junior football for Beaumaris in the Victorian Amateur Football Association (VAFA) until he was signed by the Sandringham Dragons in the Talent League. He played in the 2023 premiership as a bottom-ager for Sandringham, but following a meniscus injury in his draft year, Dolan missed out on the Dragons' 2024 premiership win.

He also represented Victoria Metro in the AFL National Championships.

== AFL career ==
Dolan was selected by the Western Bulldogs with the 31st pick in the 2024 national draft.

Dolan made his AFL debut in round 1 of the 2025 AFL season, against the North Melbourne Football Club at Docklands Stadium. He played 11 matches across the season and extended his contract at the conclusion of the Bulldogs' 2025 campaign.

Following an impressive pre-season, he was recalled to the side for the round 4 match against Essendon in 2026. Dolan proved his worth on his return, kicking goals in consecutive weeks.

== Statistics ==
Updated to the end of round 22, 2026.

Legend
G	Goals	K	Kicks	D	Disposals	T	Tackles
B	Behinds	H	Handballs	M	Marks

Season	Team	No.	Games	Totals							Averages (per game)							Votes
Season	Team	No.	Games	G	B	K	H	D	M	T	G	B	K	H	D	M	T	Votes
2025	Western Bulldogs	26	11	1	3	35	51	86	15	13	0.1	0.3	3.2	4.6	7.8	1.4	1.2	0
2026	Western Bulldogs	26	9	4	5	56	52	108	27	16	0.4	0.6	6.2	5.8	12.0	3.0	1.8	0
Career			20	5	8	91	103	194	42	29	0.3	0.4	4.6	5.2	9.7	2.1	1.5	0
