= Trevor Barker Beach Oval =

Australian rules football venue in Sandringham, Victoria

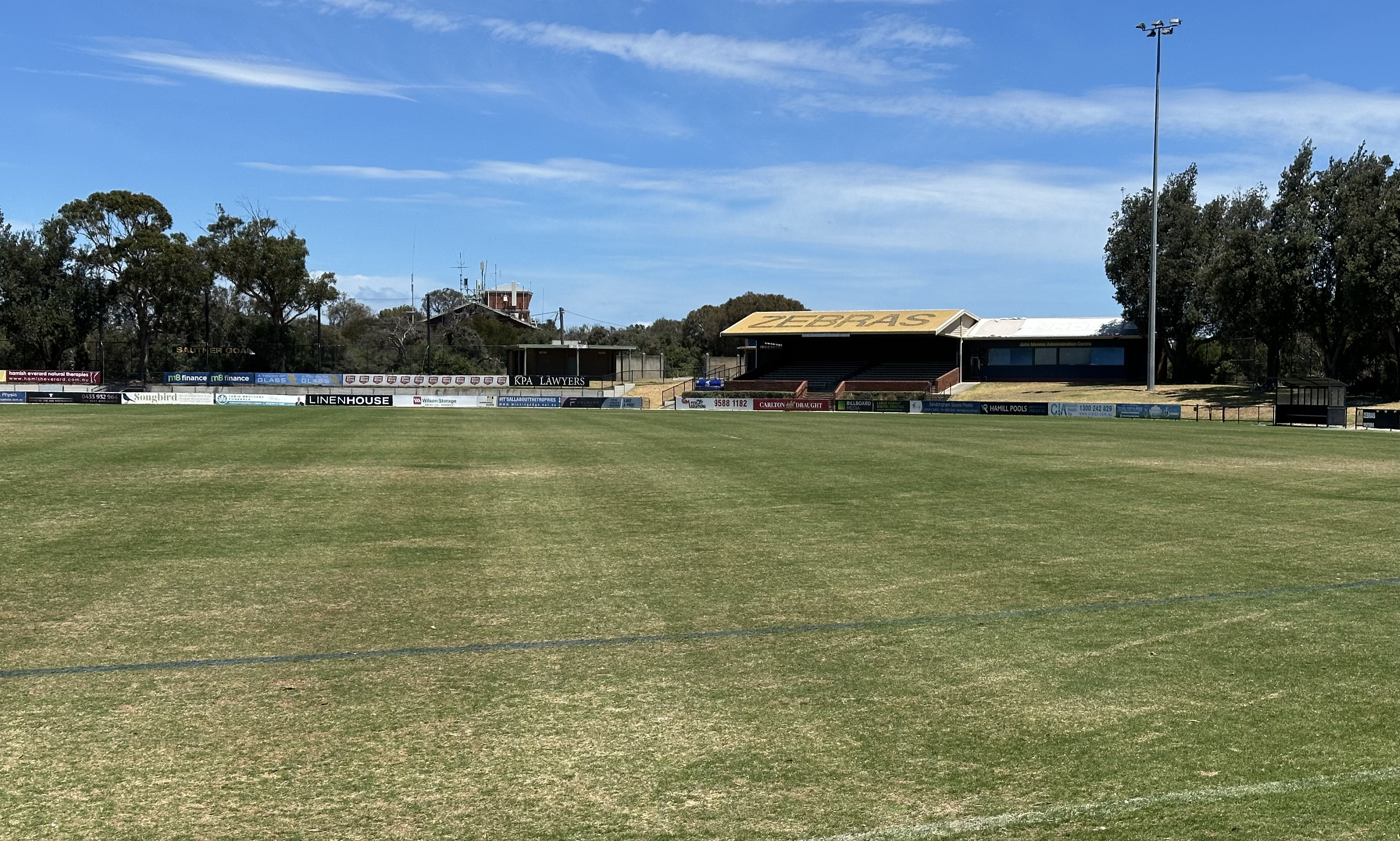
- Interactive map of Trevor Barker Beach Oval
- Former names: Beach Road Oval; Hampton Oval; Sandringham Cricket Ground
- Location: Beach Rd, Sandringham, Victoria
- Coordinates: 37°56′42″S 145°0′1″E
- Owner: City of Bayside
- Capacity: 6,000 (500 seated)
- Surface: Grass
- Field size: 160 metres × 120 metres

Construction
- Opened: 1929

Tenants
- Sandringham Football Club (VFL/VFLW); Sandringham Dragons (Talent League)

Trevor Barker Beach Oval (also known simply as Trevor Barker Oval) is an Australian rules football venue located in the Melbourne suburb of Sandringham.

Most commonly known as Beach Road Oval throughout its existence, in 1998 the ground was renamed after the late Trevor Barker, who died of cancer in 1996 at the age of 39. Since 2019, it has been known under naming rights as the Wilson Storage Trevor Barker Beach Oval (WSTBBO).

== History ==
In the late 1920s, the Sandringham City Council had been seeking to establish a senior football club in the district to join the Victorian Football Association, and providing a fenced venue to which admission could be charged was a requirement of the Association. After a previous unsuccessful application, the council received permission from the State Government to fence the existing playing oval in February 1929; the Sandringham Football Club entered the VFA the same season.

The oval has a single grandstand (the Neil Bencraft Grandstand), a southern end named after record breaking goal kicker Nick Sautner (the Sautner Goal), and an administration centre (the John Mennie Administration Centre) – a social club and a capacity for 10,000. A record crowd of 18,000 attended the venue's first Sunday VFA premiership game, held between Sandringham and Port Melbourne Football Club in April 1964. A rec footy competition was also played at the ground.
