= Brunswick Football Club (1963) =

Names
- Full name: Brunswick Football Club Incorporated
- Former name(s): North Melbourne CBC (1963−1970s); North Old Boys (1970s−2005); NOBs/St Pat's (2005−2015); Brunswick NOBSPC (2015−2017)
- Nickname(s): VAFA: Dragons, NOBS; VAFAW: Renegades

Club details
- Founded: 1963; 63 years ago
- Colours: Purple; Green; White
- Competition: VAFA: Division 2 VAFAW: Division 1 YJFL: Juniors (mixed)
- Ground: Gillon Oval

Other information
- Official website: brunswickfootball.org.au

The Brunswick Football Club is an Australian rules football club based in the Melbourne suburb of Brunswick. It was formed in 1963 as North Melbourne CBC, later renamed as North Old Boys, NOBs/St Pat's and Brunswick NOBSPC before its current name was adopted in 2017.

The club's men's team currently competes in Division 2 of the Victorian Amateur Football Association (VAFA), while the women's team is in Division 1 of the VAFA Women's (VAFAW) competition. Brunswick also fields junior teams in the Yarra Junior Football League (YJFL).

== History ==
=== Origins ===
In 1932, North Melbourne CBC Football Club was formed for students of North Melbourne Christian Brothers College. It entered the VAFA's D Section the same year, but was expelled in 1939 after fielding an unregistered player, and the club disbanded.

Also in 1939, St Patrick's Ballarat Old Collegians joined the VAFA. The club competed until 1940, then again from 1951 and 1955 and 1964 until 1977.

=== New club ===
In 1963, North Melbourne CBC (or North Melbourne CBCOB) reformed as a new club by past students of St Joseph's College and quickly ascended through the VAFA. The club won the 1964 E Section premiership, the 1965 D Section premiership, were runners-up in C Section in 1966 and again in B Section in 1967, entering A Section in 1968. Around this time, the club came to be known simply as North Old Boys, or simply NOBs.

In 2005, North Old Boys aligned themselves with St Patrick's College Old Collegians, giving St Patrick's a presence in the VAFA again. The club was renamed to North Old Boys/St Patrick's OC (or simply NOBs/St Pat's).

NOBs/St Pat's formed the Brunswick Junior Football Club (BJFC) in 2008. After experiencing some issues in finding a competition and players, the club eventually joined the Yarra Junior Football League in 2010 with an under-10s team.

In 2014, the club formed a women's team, nicknamed the Renegades, which competed in the Victorian Women's Football League until that competition was disbanded at the end of 2016. The Renegades joined the new VAFA Women's competition for its inaugural season in 2017, fielding two teams.

At the end of the 2015 season, the club was again renamed to Brunswick NOBSPC to reflect the incorporate the local Brunswick community further.

In October 2017, the club formally changed its name to Brunswick, with the change reflected for the 2018 season.
