= Beaumaris Football Club =

Australian rules football club

Names
- Full name: Beaumaris Football Club
- Nickname: Sharks

Club details
- Founded: August 1962; 64 years ago
- Colours: Blue Gold
- Competition: VAFA: Premier B VAFAW: Premier B
- President: Scott Nish
- Premierships: VAFA (5): 1995; 1997; 2003; 2010; 2016; SESFL (3): 1965; 1970; 1977
- Ground: Banksia Reserve

Uniforms
Home

Other information
- Official website: beaumarisfc.com.au

The Beaumaris Football Club, nicknamed the Sharks, is an Australian rules football club based in the Melbourne suburb of Beaumaris.

As of 2026, the club competes in the Premier B division of the Victorian Amateur Football Association (VAFA) and the VAFA Women's (VAFAW).

== History ==
At a meeting held in the Beaumaris RSL in August 1962, the Beaumaris Football Club was established to represent the local area, which at the time was largely undeveloped. The club entered the South East Suburban Football League (SESFL) in 1963. By the 1980s, Beaumaris was established as a strong club in Division 1, but the club was also affected by financial issues.

In 1995, Beaumaris joined the Victorian Amateur Football Association (VAFA) in E Section South, winning a premiership in its first VAFA season. Another premiership came in D Section in 1997 and in C Section in 2003.

Beaumaris won a fourth senior premiership in Premier C (C Section) in 2010, and after finishing as runners-up in the 2012 Premier B grand final, they were promoted to Premier Division (A Section) for the first time. However, senior coach Jason Mifsud left the club during the 2013 season.

== Honours ==
=== Premierships ===
- South East Suburban Football League (3): 1965, 1970, 1977
- Victorian Amateur Football Association (5): 1995, 1997, 2003, 2010, 2016

== VFL/AFL players ==
Bold indicates a current AFL player

- **Joel Amartey** (Sydney)
- Jason Blake (St Kilda)
- Cameron Bruce (Hawthorn, Melbourne)
- **Luke Cleary** (Western Bulldogs)
- **Calsher Dear** Hawthorn)
- **Josh Dolan** (Western Bulldogs)
- Leigh Fisher (St Kilda)
- **Oliver Florent** (Carlton, Sydney)
- Rod Galt (Carlton, St Kilda)
- **Jack Gunston** (Adelaide, Brisbane Lions, Hawthorn)
- Wayne Judson (St Kilda)
- Tom Lynch (Adelaide, St Kilda)
- **Cameron Mackenzie** (Hawthorn)
- Stephen Milne (St Kilda)
- **Mitch Owens** (St Kilda)
- Michael Roberts (St Kilda, Richmond)
- **Jack Scrimshaw** (Gold Coast, Hawthorn)
- David Spriggs (Geelong, Sydney)
- **Callum Sinclair** (St Kilda)
- **Marcus Windhager** (St Kilda)
