= South Melbourne Districts Football Club =

South Melbourne Districts

Names
- Full name: South Melbourne Districts Sports Club
- Nickname(s): Bloods, Swans, Districts
- Motto: "Onward To Victory"

2024 season
- After finals: VAFA: 3rd VAFAW: N/A
- Home-and-away season: VAFA: 3rd VAFAW: 7th
- Leading goalkicker: VAFA: Jamie Brooker (45); VAFAW: Louise Payne (5)
- Best and fairest: VAFA: Tom Foley; VAFAW: Clara Samms

Club details
- Founded: 1912; 114 years ago
- Competition: VAFA: Division 2 VAFAW: Division 4 SMJFL: Juniors
- Ground: Lindsay Hassett Oval

Uniforms
Home

Other information
- Official website: smdsc.com.au

The South Melbourne Districts Football Club, nicknamed the Bloods, is an Australian rules football club based in South Melbourne. The club also has athletics and cricket programs.

As of 2025, the club's men's team competes in Division 2 of the Victorian Amateur Football Association (VAFA) and the women's team is in Division 3 of the VAFA Women's (VAFAW), while junior teams compete in the South Metro Junior Football League (SMJFL).

== History ==
=== VJFA and Sub-Districts ===
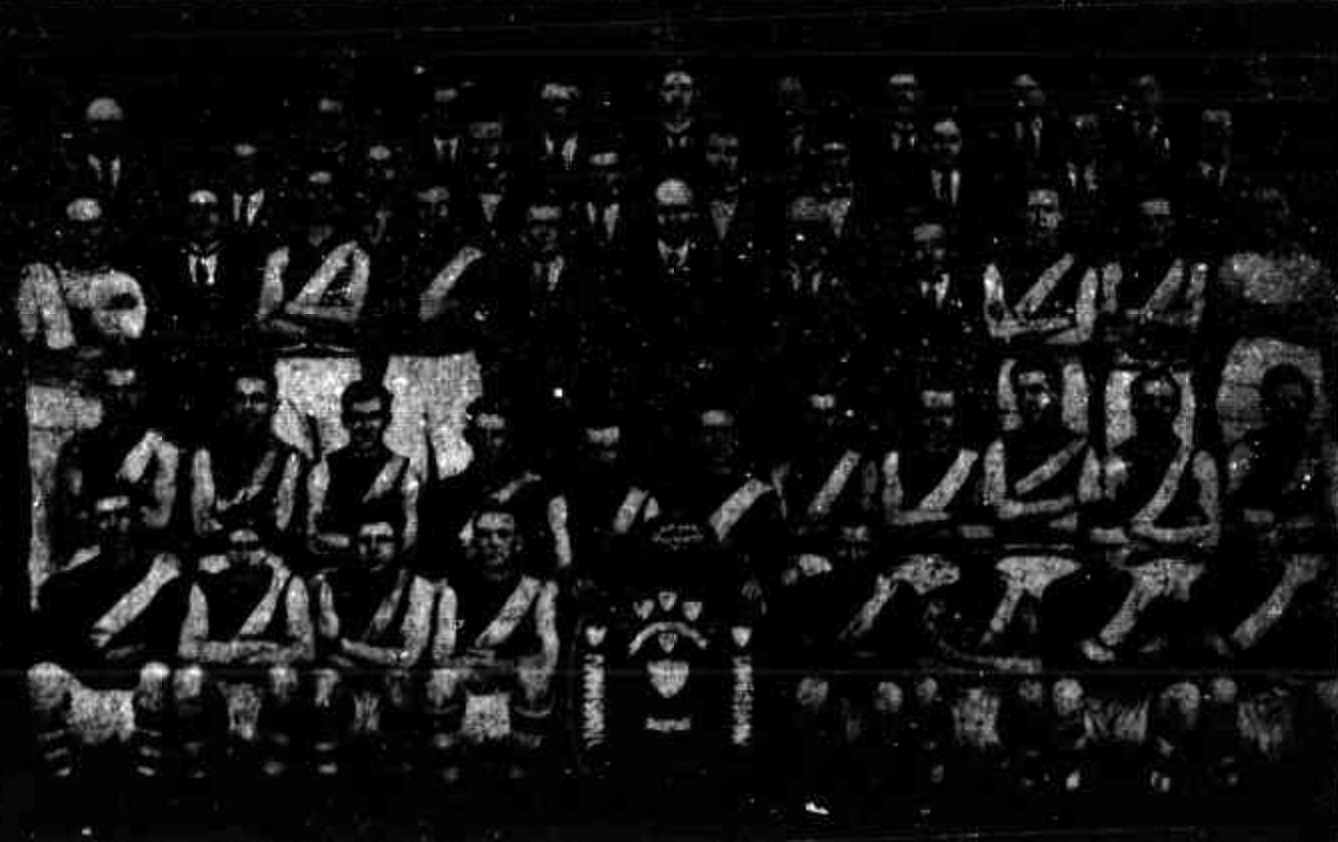
The inaugural South Melbourne Districts premiership team in 1924

South Melbourne Districts was formed in 1912, although its origins can be traced back to the Pembroke Juniors that played in the mid-1890s. The club entered the Victorian Junior Football Association (VJFA) in 1914, finishing fourth on the ladder before being defeated by Port Melbourne Railway United by 51 points in the grand final.

The club made its second grand final in 1922 after another fourth-placed home-and-away finish, where it lost to North Melbourne Juniors by 22 points. In 1924, the club won its first premiership with a 33-point victory over Hawthorn Juniors. The club did not have a home ground for the 1925 season, and did not find a permanent home ground until the mid-1930s.

The Districts had a close relationship with the South Melbourne Football Club (now Sydney Swans) from its formation, with many players going on to play for both clubs. In the late 1920s, the Districts donated 40 guineas to South Melbourne to stop the club folding, and often provided assistance payments to players when needed.

In the 1920s and 1930s, MLC Robert Williams served as the club's president, while senator Joseph Hannan served as vice-president. Williams died in a car crash at Wagga Wagga in March 1938, and his son − Alf Williams − took over as acting president until officially becoming club president in February 1939.

South Melbourne Districts' last season in the VJFA was in 1926, where it made the semi-finals. By this point, the VJFA had started to formally become the reserves competition for the Victorian Football Association (VFA), and South Melbourne Districts left the VJFA to join the VFL Sub-Districts in 1927.

The club made a grand final in its second Sub-Districts season in 1928 under captain-coach Joe Russell, before winning a premiership in 1930 against Sunshine. At some stage in the 1930s, it moved to the VFA Sub-Districts and continued in that competition until at least the end of the 1936 season. (Note: The Argus wrote in April 1936 that South Melbourne Districts was in the VFA Sub-Districts, while The Age wrote in May 1936 that the club was instead in the VFL Sub-Districts. It is possible that the Districts had two teams, one in each competition, just as Balwyn had a team in both the VFL Sub-Districts and Reporter District Football Association during the 1927 season.)

South Melbourne Districts joined the Metropolitan Football League (MFL), the successor to the VFL Sub-Districts, when the competition was formed in 1950.

=== SESFL/SFL ===
In 1974, South Melbourne Districts left the struggling MFL to join the South East Suburban Football League (SESFL). The club won its first SESFL premiership in 1976 with a 15-point victory over Carnegie in Division 2, and a second premiership came in 1983 against North Kew.

The SESFL became the Southern Football League (SFL) in 1992, and merged with the Eastern Suburbs Churches Football Association (ESCFA) in 1993 to become an expanded SFL. At the end of the 1999 season, South Melbourne Districts left the SFL to join the Victorian Amateur Football Association (VAFA).

=== VAFA ===
South Melbourne Districts joined the VAFA for the 2000 season, entering D4 Section. The club started strong, winning a premiership in its inaugural VAFA season after defeating Bentleigh (who also joined the VAFA in 2000) by 27 points in the grand final.

The club went back-to-back with a Division 3 premiership in 2006 and a Division 2 premiership in 2007.

South Melbourne Districts entered its first women's team in the inaugural VAFA Women's season in 2017, finishing third in Division 4.

In 2024, the club was the subject of controversy after being asked by animal rights activist Sheena Chhabra to cut ties with Ralphs Meat Company and to end its Auskick sausage sizzle "on the grounds of animal cruelty, the impact of farming livestock for meat and the negative health effects of red meat".

== AFL/AFLW players ==
A number of South Melbourne Districts players have played in the Australian Football League (AFL), which was previously known as the Victorian Football League (VFL), as well as in the AFL Women's (AFLW). South Melbourne coach Alan Miller, who never played a VFL game, also played for South Melbourne Districts.

=== VFL/AFL players ===
- Roy Cazaly − St Kilda, South Melbourne
- Charlie Clarke − Western Bulldogs
- Keith Forbes − Essendon
- Danny Jacobs − Essendon
- Max Ramsden − Hawthorn
- Murphy Reid − Fremantle
- Jack "Basher" Williams − South Melbourne

=== AFLW players ===
- Sofia Hurley − Sydney
