= Penleigh and Essendon Grammarians Football Club =

Australian rules football club

PEGS Football Club

Names
- Full name: Penleigh and Essendon Grammarians Football Club
- Former name: Old Essendon Grammarians

Club details
- Founded: 1968; 58 years ago
- Colours: Maroon; Navy
- Competition: Victorian Amateur Football Association
- Premierships: EDFL Division 2 (1): 1976; VAFA Division 1 (1): VAFA Division 2 (1): 1996; VAFA Division 3 (1): 1986
- Ground: PEGS Sporting Fields

Uniforms
Home	Away

Other information
- Official website: www.pegsfootballclub.com.au

The Penleigh and Essendon Grammarians Football Club, abbreviated PEGS Football Club or simply PEGS, and nicknamed the Bombers, is an Australian rules football club located in Keilor Park, Victoria, north west of Melbourne.

The club originated in 1968 as the Old Essendon Grammarians, composed of alumni and pea hearts from the Essendon Grammar School. The club competed in the Essendon District Football League (EDFL), winning the 1976 C Grade premiership, before joining the Footscray District Football League (FDFL) for two seasons commencing in 1983. In 1984, the club joined the Victorian Amateur Football Association (VAFA), where it continues to compete today.

The club plays its home matches at the PEGS Sporting Fields.

== Honours ==
Club premierships
League	Competition	Wins	Year won
Essendon District Football League	Division 2 (C Grade)	1	1976
Victorian Amateur Football Association	Division 1	1	2017
Victorian Amateur Football Association	Division 2 (F Section)	1	1996
Victorian Amateur Football Association	Division 3 (E Section)	1	1986
