= Old Geelong =

Names
- Full name: Old Geelong Sporting Club
- Nickname(s): OGs, Oggers

Club details
- Founded: 1954; 72 years ago
- Colours
- Competition: VAFA
- President: Simon Bones
- Coach: Nick Dixon & Jack Crameri
- Captain(s): Will Horsfall, Celia Cody & Jules Grant
- Premierships: (7): 1956, 1957, 1966, 1990, 2005, 2016, 2024
- Ground: Como Park

Uniforms
Home

Other information
- Official website: oldgeelong.com.au

The Old Geelong Sporting Club (known as the 'OGs') is an amateur men's and women's sports club based at Como Park, South Yarra, Victoria. The teams compete in the "Premier A & B" Divisions of the Victorian Amateur Football Association (VAFA). The club has associations with the two Geelong-based APS schools Geelong Grammar School and The Geelong College and draws many of its players from these two schools. The Club also has a strong link with many regional areas of Victoria, and attracts players from across the country. The OGs have won six Senior premierships, nine Reserves premierships, two Under 19’s premierships, two Club XXVIII premierships, one Senior Women's premiership & one Women’s Reserves premiership in their history.

The Australian rules football team competes in the VAFA Premier B Men's division and the VAFA Premier A Women's division and has 6 teams consisting of Men's Seniors, Reserves, Thirds and Under 19s, and Women's Seniors and Reserves.

Other sports practised at Old Geelong are netball, cricket and tennis.

== History ==
The Old Geelong Football Club was formed in early 1954 as the Old Geelong Grammarians Football Club, playing its first game in the Victorian Amateur Football Association's newly created E Section on 24 April of that year. It enjoyed early success as runners-up in 1955, and Premierships in D and C Sections in 1956 and 1957 respectively. In its inaugural year it used a ground at Yarra Park, and then moved to the small St.Kevins No 2 ground for seasons 1955-1958. In 1959 it transferred to a larger ground in Burnley, and after a couple of years there, it was fortunate to secure the use of Como Park, South Yarra, where it has been based ever since.

At the end of 1973, in recognition of a major change in the membership of the Club, with a significant number of Old Geelong Collegians in particular having joined it in previous seasons, the name of the Club was changed to the Old Geelong Football Club. Whilst the Club endeavours to recruit from and retain close connections with both Geelong schools, the Club welcomes players from all sources.

In 2017 the OGs fielded their first women's football side that competed in the inaugural season of the VAFA women's league.

== Coaching staff ==
- Men's Senior: Nick Dixon
- Men’s Reserve: Abe Sheahan
- Men's Thirds: Lawson Smart
- Under 19s: Mickey Nicholls
- Women's Senior: Jack Crameri
- Women's Reserve: Lexie Perrott

== Premierships ==
- Seniors (6): 1956, 1957, 1966, 1990, 2005, 2016
- Reserves (9): 1966, 1988, 1990, 1997, 2005, 2007, 2012, 2013, 2022
- Under 19s (2): 2009, 2012
- Thirds/Club XVIII (2): 2012, 2016
- Senior Women (1): 2024
- Reserves Women (1): 2019
