= 1930 MAFA season =

35th season of the Metropolitan Amateur Football Association

- Date: 26 April – 20 September 1930
- Teams: 30

The 1930 MAFA season was the 35th season of the Metropolitan Amateur Football Association (MAFA), an Australian rules football competition played in the state of Victoria. The season began on 26 April and concluded on 20 September, with 30 teams participating across three divisions under a promotion and relegation system.

== Background ==
Two new rules were introduced for this season: holding the ball, which had been introduced nationwide by the Australian National Football Council (ANFC), and an order-off rule, which allowed for umpires to send off a player if they were guilty of unfair play twice in the same match. The holding the ball rule was unpopular in football competitions across Australia, leading to it being repealed by the ANFC after only two months.

== Association membership ==
Two clubs – Brighton TSOB and Dandenong KSP – entered the MAFA this season. The only club to depart following the 1929 season was Old Ivanhoe, which disbanded following a last-placed finish in C Section in its inaugural season.

University A and University B, which had been known as the "Blues" and the "Blacks" respectively since the 1921 MAFA season, officially adopted the nicknames beginning this season.

=== Black Rock expulsion ===
During a match on 17 May, Elsternwick alleged that supporters of Black Rock had threatened Elsternwick players and injured club officials. It was also alleged that Black Rock players had set upon Elsternwick players after the match had ended. A second incident also occurred during a match against Old Melburnians, with police summoned after Black Rock supporters became unruly.

By a "large majority", the MAFA decided on 3 June to expel Black Rock. The club was advised about an appeal by Ian Macfarlan, the former Attorney-General of Victoria, but it remained expelled from the competition. The remaining scheduled matches involving Black Rock were considered byes, with impacted clubs receiving four premiership points. Despite not playing any games in the second half of the season, Black Rock player A. Parry was the joint best and fairest winner in A Section.

== A Section ==
1930 A Section season
- Date: 26 April – 6 September 1930
- Teams: 10
- Premiers: Old Melburnians; 1st A Section premiership
- Runners-up: Elsternwick; 1st A Section runners-up result
- Minor premiers: Old Melburnians; 1st A Section minor premiership
- Relegated: Brightonvale
- Best and fairest: A. Parry (Black Rock); T. Taylor (Brightonvale)

Old Melburnians won the A Section premiership for the first time, defeating Elsternwick by 103 points in the grand final.

=== Venues ===
Club	Home venue(s)	Capacity
Black Rock		
Brightonvale		
Collegians		
Elsternwick	Elsternwick Park	
Murrumbeena		
Old Melburnians		
Old Scotch	Old Scotch Oval	
State Savings Bank		
University Blacks	University Oval	
University Blues	University Oval	

=== Ladder ===
Pos	Team	Pld	W	L	D	PF	PA	PP	Pts	Qualification
1	Old Melburnians (P)	18	16	2	0				64	Finals series
2	Elsternwick	18	14	4	0				56	Finals series
3	University Blacks	18							52	Finals series
4	Old Scotch	18							48	Finals series
5	State Savings Bank	18							44	
	Collegians	18								
	Murrumbeena	18								
	University Blues	18								
9	Brightonvale	18								Relegated to B Section
−	Black Rock (E)									Expelled during season

(P) Premiers; (E) Expelled

=== Finals ===
==== Grand Final ====
1930 MAFA A Section Grand Final
Saturday, 6 September	Old Melburnians	def.	Elsternwick	Brighton Cricket Ground
5.8 (38) 23.16 (154)	Q1; Q2; Q3; Final	0.3 (3) 7.9 (51)
N. Mitchell 7, A. Mitchell 3, Atkins 3, Whiting 2, Campbell 2, Atkinson 2, Rowlands 2, Butherford, Ewing	Goals	Howells 3, Applebe 2, Vickers 2

== B Section ==
1930 B Section season
- Date: 26 April – 6 September 1930
- Teams: 10
- Premiers: Teachers' College; 1st B Section premiership
- Runners-up: East Malvern; 1st B Section runners-up result
- Minor premiers: Teachers' College; 1st B Section minor premiership
- Promoted: Teachers' College; East Malvern
- Relegated: Old Haileybury-Trinity; Old Caulfield Grammarians
- Best and fairest: W. Murphy (Teachers' College)

Teachers' College won the B Section premiership for the first time, defeating East Malvern by 36 points in the grand final.

=== Venues ===
Club	Home venue(s)	Capacity
Brunswick		
East Malvern	Glen Iris Oval	
Geelong		
Glen Huntly		
Old Caulfield Grammarians		
Old Haileybury-Trinity		
Old Paradians		
St Paul's		
Surrey Hills		
Teachers' College		

=== Ladder ===
Pos	Team	Pld	W	L	D	PF	PA	PP	Pts	Qualification
1	Teachers' College (P)	18	14	4	0	1654	1299	127.3	56	Finals series
2	Geelong	18	12	6	0	1596	1183	134.9	48	Finals series
3	East Malvern	18	12	6	0	1513	1312	115.3	48	Finals series
4	Brunswick	18	12	6	0	1415	1241	114.0	48	Finals series
5	St Paul's	18	10	8	0	1210	1058	114.4	40	
6	Surrey Hills	18	9	9	0	1429	1399	102.1	36	
7	Glen Huntly	18	6	12	0	1284	1327	96.8	24	
8	Old Paradians	18	6	12	0	1265	1495	84.6	24	
9	Old Haileybury-Trinity	18	5	13	0	994	1435	69.3	20	
10	Old Caulfield Grammarians	18	4	14	0	957	1538	62.2	16	Relegated to C Section

Rules for classification: 1) points; 2) percentage; 3) number of points for.
(P) Premiers

=== Finals ===
==== Grand Final ====
1930 MAFA B Section Grand Final
Saturday, 6 September	Teachers' College	def.	East Malvern	Bentleigh
5.8 (38); 6.11 (47) 17.19 (121)	Q1; Q2; Q3; Final	0.2 (2); 4.4 (28) 13.7 (85)
Collins 6, Du Bourg 3, Murphy 3, Lang 2. Reah 2, Cording	Goals	Barwick 4, Rogers 3, Hall 2, Sibthorpe 2, Milligan, Ward

== C Section ==
1930 C Section season
- Date: 26 April – 20 September 1930
- Teams: 10
- Premiers: Bentleigh District; 1st C Section premiership
- Runners-up: Brighton TSOB; 1st C Section runners-up result
- Minor premiers: Bentleigh District; 1st C Section minor premiership
- Promoted: Bentleigh District; Brighton TSOB
- Best and fairest: B. Skilbeck (Burwood)

Bentleigh District won the C Section premiership for the first time, defeating Brighton TSOB by 29 points in the grand final. Both clubs were promoted to B Section for the 1931 season.

=== Ladder ===
Pos	Team	Pld	W	L	D	PF	PA	PP	Pts	Qualification
1	Bentleigh District (P)	18								Finals series
2	Brighton TSOB	18								Finals series
3	Old Xaverians	18								Finals series
4	Burwood	18								Finals series
	Dandenong KSP	18								
	Kingsville	18								
	MHSOB	18								
	Sandringham	18								
	South Caulfield	18								
	West Hawthorn	18								

(P) Premiers

=== Finals ===
==== Semi-finals ====
	Semi-finals
Saturday, 30 August	Brighton TSOB 13.11 (89)	def.	Old Xaverians 10.8 (68)	Bentleigh
Saturday, 6 September	Bentleigh District 10.19 (79)	def. by	Burwood 15.5 (97)	Yarra Park
Because of a shortage of suitable grounds, the semi-final between Bentleigh District and Burwood was played one week after all other MAFA semi-finals.

==== Preliminary final ====
	Preliminary final
Saturday, 13 September	Brighton TSOB 9.6 (60)	def.	Burwood 4.7 (31)	Yarra Park

==== Grand Final ====
1930 MAFA C Section Grand Final
Saturday, 20 September	Bentleigh District	def.	Brighton TSOB	Yarra Park
2.5 (17); 4.6 (30); 8.11 (59); 15.12 (102)	Q1; Q2; Q3; Final	1.0 (6); 4.4 (28); 6.6 (42); 11.7 (73)
Crook 6, Wallace 3. T. Dalton 2, Martin 2, Dunning and McCulloch	Goals	Hodgens 5, Thoms 4, Dudgeon, Macaulay
Martin, Crook, J. Dalton, F. Dalton, Sitch, Middleton	Best	Hodgens, Thoms, Dudgeon, Macaulay, Beancourt, Bleckley
