= List of Victorian Amateur Football Association premiers =

This page is a complete listing of the premiers of the Victorian Amateur Football Association (VAFA), the largest senior community Australian rules football competition in Victoria.

The competition was known as the Metropolitan Junior Football Association (MJFA) until 1912, then the Metropolitan Amateur Football Association (MAFA) until 1933 when the competition became the VAFA.

== Men's premierships ==
=== Seniors ===
From the VAFA Website:

Year	Premier	Premier B	Premier C	Division 1	Division 2	Division 3	Division 4
2026	University Blues	Collegians	Parkdale Vultures	Preston Bullants	Power House	Wattle Park	6 sections (2024-)
2025	Old Brighton	Old Trinity	Beaumaris	Old Peninsula	St Mary's Salesian	Power House	6 sections (2024-)
2024	Old Scotch	Old Haileyburians	Old Carey	Prahran	Elsternwick	Canterbury	6 sections (2024-)
2023	Collegians	St Bernard's	Old Ivanhoe	Glen Eira	Parkside	Elsternwick	North Brunswick
2022	St Kevin's	Old Haileyburians	Monash Blues	PEGS	Ivanhoe	South Melbourne Districts	La Trobe Uni
2021	(Season abandoned due to COVID-19)						
2020	(No competition due to COVID-19)						
2019	University Blues	Caulfield Grammarians	Williamstown CYMS	Preston Bullants	Whitefriars	Aquinas	St Francis Xavier
2018	St Kevin's	St Bernard's	Fitzroy	Ormond	UHS-VU	Glen Eira	North Brunswick AFC
2017	St Kevin's	Old Brighton	Old Haileyburians	PEGS	Prahran Assumption	UHS-VU	Aquinas
2016	Old Xaverians	Beaumaris	Mazenod	Old Geelong	Preston Bullants	Glen Eira	Westbourne Grammarians
2015	St Bernard's	St Kevin's	Old Haileyburians	Kew	Old Paradians	West Brunswick	Canterbury
2014	University Blacks	University Blues	Hampton Rovers	Williamstown CYMS	Kew	Northern Blues	West Brunswick
2013	Old Xaverians	Old Brighton	Old Ivanhoe	Hampton Rovers	Therry Penola	Kew	Northern Blues
2012	Collegians	University Blacks	Parkdale Vultures	North Old Boys/St Pats	Bulleen-Templestowe	Yarra Valley	South Mornington
2011	Collegians	Caulfield Grammarians	Ajax	Parkdale Vultures	St John's	Prahran/Assumption	St Francis Xavier
2010	Old Xaverians	Old Carey	Beaumaris	Werribee AFC	Banyule	La Trobe Uni	Monash Gryphons
2009	Old Xaverians	Old Melburnians	MHSOB	Rupertswood	Williamstown CYMS	Bentleigh	La Trobe Uni
2008	St Bede's/Mentone Tigers	Marcellin	Ormond	Bulleen-Templestowe	Werribee AFC	Williamstown CYMS	West Brunswick
2007	Old Xaverians	St Bede's/Mentone Tigers	Old Camberwell	Oakleigh	South Melbourne Districts	Old Westbourne	UHS-VU
2006	Old Haileyburians	Collegians	St Bede's/Mentone Tigers	Old Carey	Oakleigh	South Melbourne Districts	Powerhouse
2005	Old Xaverians	Old Ivanhoe	University Blacks	Fitzroy Reds	Old Geelong	St John's	Elsternwick
2004	University Blues	St Kevin's	MHSOB	University Blacks	Bulleen-Templestowe	Oakleigh	Old Westbourne
2003	Old Xaverians	De La Salle	Beaumaris	Monash Blues	Fitzroy Reds	Swinburne Uni	UHS-VU
2002	St Bernard's	Old Melburnians	Whitefriars	St Leo's Emmaus Wattle Park	Yarra Valley	West Brunswick	Rupertswood
2001	Marcellin	Old Ivanhoe	Hampton Rovers	Old Camberwell	Mentone	Fitzroy Reds	Syndal Tally Ho
2000	Old Xaverians	Mazenod	Therry Penola	Caulfield Grammarians	University Blacks	Powerhouse	South Melbourne Districts
Year	A Section	B Section	C Section	D Section	E White	E Blue	F Section
1999	Old Xaverians	Old Trinity	Whitefriars	AJAX	Old Carey	La Trobe Uni	Eley Park
1998	Old Xaverians	Marcellin	Hampton Rovers	Whitefriars	Caulfield Grammarians	Oakleigh	Hawthorn
Year	A Section	B Section	C Section	D Section	E South	E Central	E East
1997	Old Xaverians	Old Brighton	Marcellin	Beaumaris	Southbank	University Blacks	Yarra Valley
1996	Old Xaverians	Old Trinity	St Kevin's Old Boys	Monash Blues	Salesian	Old Essendon	Aquinas
1995	Old Xaverians	Old Haileyburians	Old Ivanhoe	Hampton Rovers	Beaumaris	University Reds	St Leo's Emmaus Wattle Park
Year	A Section	B Section	C Section	D Section	E Section	F Section	G Section
1994	Old Melburnians	Old Trinity	St Kilda South Caulfield	Old Ivanhoe	Glenhuntly	Yarra Valley	Richmond Central
1993	Collegians	Old Melburnians	Mazenod	St Bede's/Mentone Tigers	Old Camberwell	St Mary's	Oakleigh
1992	Collegians	Old Trinity	Fawkner	Mazenod	Brunswick	St Leo's Wattle Park	6 sections (1971−1992)
1991	De La Salle	St Bernard's	Whitefriars	MHSOB	Mazenod	Elsternwick	6 sections (1971−1992)
1990	Ormond	Old Haileyburians	Old Mentonians	Ajax	Old Geelong	St Mary's	6 sections (1971−1992)
1989	Ormond	De La Salle	Old Haileyburians	Thomastown	La Trobe Uni	Mazenod	6 sections (1971−1992)
1988	Ormond	Parkside	Old Melberians	Preston MBOB	Whitefriars	La Trobe Uni	6 sections (1971−1992)
1987	Ormond	St Bernard's	Monash Blues	Old Ivanhoe	State Bank	Aquinas	6 sections (1971−1992)
1986	Collegians	Old Paradians	Banyule	Balaclava	Bulleen United	Old Essendon	6 sections (1971−1992)
1985	Ormond	Marcellin	Fawkner	Old Trinity	Heatherton	Brunswick	6 sections (1971−1992)
1984	De La Salle	St Bernard's	St Kilda CBCOB	Therry CCOB	Balaclava	Williamstown CYMS	6 sections (1971−1992)
1983	De La Salle	Bulleen-Templestowe	Caulfield Grammarians	Banyule	Thomastown	Footscray TSOB	6 sections (1971−1992)
1982	North Old Boys	Old Melburnians	Old Camberwell	Parkside	Therry C.C.O.B.	Bulleen United	6 sections (1971−1992)
1981	Old Xaverians	University Blues	Alphington	Coburg	North Brunswick	Banyule	6 sections (1971−1992)
1980	De La Salle	Old Xaverians	Old Brighton	Alphington	West Brunswick	University Reds	6 sections (1971−1992)
1979	De La Salle	Ajax	Kew	Bulleen-Templestowe	AMP Society	St Pius	6 sections (1971−1992)
1978	Old Scotch	Old Melburnians	Old Xaverians	Old Camberwell	Bulleen-Templestowe	Thornbury	6 sections (1971−1992)
1977	De La Salle	Old Scotch	Fawkner	Old Brighton	Heatherton	St Bedes O.C.	6 sections (1971−1992)
1976	North Old Boys	Marcellin	Old Melburnians	Old Xaverians	La Trobe Uni	West Brunswick	6 sections (1971−1992)
1975	St Bernard's	De La Salle	St Kilda CBOC	Fawkner	Ajax	Monash Whites	6 sections (1971−1992)
1974	University Blacks	Old Trinity	Marcellin	Brunswick	Fawkner	North Brunswick	6 sections (1971−1992)
1973	Ormond	Reservoir OB	Powerhouse	Alphington	Old Ivanhoe	Fawkner	6 sections (1971−1992)
1972	Ormond	Geelong	Reservoir OB	Parkside	State Saving Bank	Old Camberwell	6 sections (1971−1992)
1971	Ormond	Old Paradians	Taroonga-Malvern	Powerhouse	St Patrick's	Marcellin	6 sections (1971−1992)
1970	Caulfield Grammarians	Old Scotch	UHSOB	Old Trinity	Brunswick	5 sections (1954−1970)	
1969	Coburg	Ivanhoe	Commonwealth Bank	Old Haileyburians	Fairfield	5 sections (1954−1970)	
1968	Old Paradians	Ormond	Footscray TSOB	National Bank	AMP Society	5 sections (1954−1970)	
1967	Old Paradians	University Blues	Alphington	St Patrick's	Assumption	5 sections (1954−1970)	
1966	Old Paradians	Kew	Geelong	Old Geelong	Ajax	5 sections (1954−1970)	
1965	University Blacks	Old Scotch	St Kilda CBCOB	North Melbourne CBCOB	St Patrick's	5 sections (1954−1970)	
1964	Old Paradians	University Blacks	Kew	St Bernard's	North Melbourne CBCOB	5 sections (1954−1970)	
1963	Old Paradians	Coburg	Parkside	Old Haileyburians	St Bernard's	5 sections (1954−1970)	
1962	Old Paradians	Old Xaverians	Kew	Fairfield	Monash University	5 sections (1954−1970)	
1961	Collegians	MHSOB	State Savings Bank	Caulfield Grammarians	Old Carey	5 sections (1954−1970)	
1960	University Blues	UHSOB	MHSOB	St Kilda CBCOC	West Brunswick	5 sections (1954−1970)	
1959	Collegians	Old Melburnians	Powerhouse	Footscray TSOB	Preston	5 sections (1954−1970)	
1958	Collegians	Old Paradians	De La Salle	Port Melbourne	St Kilda CBCOB	5 sections (1954−1970)	
1957	Collegians	Alphington	Old Geelong	National Bank	Port Melbourne	5 sections (1954−1970)	
1956	Ivanhoe	Collegians	St Kilda City	Old Geelong	National Bank	5 sections (1954−1970)	
1955	Old Melburnians	Coburg	Brunswick	South Melbourne City	De La Salle	5 sections (1954−1970)	
1954	Old Melburnians	Ivanhoe	Parkside	Teachers' College	South Melbourne City	5 sections (1954−1970)	
1953	Old Melburnians	Kew	Caulfield Grammarians	Footscray TSOB	4 sections (1932−1953)		
1952	University Blues	MHSOB	Coburg	St Kevin's	4 sections (1932−1953)		
1951	Hampton Rovers	Old Paradians	Myer	Elsternwick	4 sections (1932−1953)		
1950	Ormond	Commonwealth Bank	Kew	East Malvern	4 sections (1932−1953)		
1949	University Blacks	Geelong	North Alphington	Caulfield Grammarians	4 sections (1932−1953)		
1948	University Blacks	Old Xaverians	Geelong	Fairfield	4 sections (1932−1953)		
1947	University Blacks	Hampton Rovers	Commonwealth Bank		4 sections (1932−1953)		
1946	University Blacks	MHSOB	Hampton Rovers		4 sections (1932−1953)		
1940–45	(No competition due to World War II)				4 sections (1932−1953)		
1939	University Blacks	Elsternwick	MHSOB	Hampton Rovers	4 sections (1932−1953)		
1938	University Blacks	Old Melburnians	Old Xaverians	Fairfield	4 sections (1932−1953)		
1937	Collegians	Malvern	Coburg	MHSOB	4 sections (1932−1953)		
1936	Collegians	Ivanhoe	Parkdale	Coburg	4 sections (1932−1953)		
1935	University Blacks	Teachers' College	Ivanhoe	Malvern	4 sections (1932−1953)		
1934	Old Scotch Collegians	ES & A Bank	Ormond	Ivanhoe	4 sections (1932−1953)		
1933	Old Scotch Collegians	Geelong	ES & A Bank	Ormond	4 sections (1932−1953)		
1932	Old Scotch Collegians	Brunswick	Canterbury Utd Churches	West Brunswick	4 sections (1932−1953)		
1931	Old Scotch Collegians	Geelong	West Hawthorn	3 sections (1926−1932)			
1930	Old Melburnians	Teachers' College	Bentleigh	3 sections (1926−1932)			
1929	University Blacks	Murrumbeena	East Malvern	3 sections (1926−1932)			
1928	University Blacks	Brightonvale	Black Rock	3 sections (1926−1932)			
1927	Old Scotch Collegians	Murrumbeena	State Savings Bank	3 sections (1926−1932)			
1926	Old Scotch Collegians	Collegians	Brightonvale	3 sections (1926−1932)			
1925	Elsternwick	Caulfield Gr.	2 sections (1923−1925)				
1924	Old Scotch Collegians	Murrumbeena	2 sections (1923−1925)				
1923	Old Scotch Collegians	Sandringham	2 sections (1923−1925)				
Year	Premier	1 section (1892−1922)					
1922	University B	1 section (1892−1922)					
1921	University B	1 section (1892−1922)					
1920	Elsternwick	1 section (1892−1922)					
1916–19	(No competition due to World War I)	1 section (1892−1922)					
1915	Collingwood District	1 section (1892−1922)					
1914	South Yarra	1 section (1892−1922)					
1913	Leopold	1 section (1892−1922)					
1912	Beverley	1 section (1892−1922)					
1911	Leopold	1 section (1892−1922)					
1910	Leopold	1 section (1892−1922)					
1909	South Yarra	1 section (1892−1922)					
1908	South Yarra	1 section (1892−1922)					
1907	University	1 section (1892−1922)					
1906	University	1 section (1892−1922)					
1905	Port Rovers	1 section (1892−1922)					
1904	Collegians	1 section (1892−1922)					
1903	Brighton	1 section (1892−1922)					
1902	Collegians	1 section (1892−1922)					
1901	Leopold	1 section (1892−1922)					
1900	Leopold	1 section (1892−1922)					
1899	Collegians	1 section (1892−1922)					
1898	Collegians	1 section (1892−1922)					
1897	South St. Kilda	1 section (1892−1922)					
1896	Collegians	1 section (1892−1922)					
1895	South St. Kilda	1 section (1892−1922)					
1894	South St. Kilda	1 section (1892−1922)					
1893	South St. Kilda	1 section (1892−1922)					
1892	Collegians	1 section (1892−1922)					

== Men's grand finals ==
From the VAFA Website:

GF	Premiership decided by a grand final where a challenge was not needed
GF (R)	Premiership decided by a grand final replay, after the scheduled grand final was drawn
CF	Premiership decided by a challenge final under the Argus system
GF (N)	Premiership decided by a grand final because no team finished outright first after full season win–loss record
W/L	Premiership decided by full season win–loss record
NF	No grand final held

=== Premier ===
Premier Division was known as A Section (or A Grade) until 2010.

Year	Premiers	Runners-up	Score	Venue	Date	Report
1892	Collegians (1)	Alberton (1)				
1893	South St Kilda (1)	Alberton (2)				
1894	South St Kilda (2)	Collegians (1)				
1895	South St Kilda (3)	St Mary's (1)				
1896	Collegians (2)	Caulfield (1)				
1897	South St Kilda (4)	Collegians (2)				
1898	Collegians (3)	Caulfield (2)				
1899	Collegians (4)	Leopold (1)				
1900	Leopold (1)	South Melbourne Juniors (1)	7.10 (52) d. 2.8 (20)	South Melbourne Cricket Ground	22 September 1920	
1901	Leopold (2)	Collegians (3)				
1902	Collegians (5)	Brighton (1)	9.12 (66) d. 7.5 (47)	Victoria Park	20 September 1902	
1903	Brighton (1)	Leopold (2)				
1904	Collegians (6)	Port Rovers (1)	9.17 (71) d. 4.8 (32)	Richmond City Reserve	10 September 1904	
1905	Port Rovers (1)	South Yarra (1)				
1906	University (1)	Collegians (4)				
1907	University (2)	Brighton (2)				
1908	South Yarra (1)	Leopold (3)				
1909	South Yarra (2)	Beverley (1)	6.10 (46) d. 3.7 (25)	Melbourne Cricket Ground	11 September 1909	
1910	Leopold (3)	Carlton District (1)	10.9 (69) d. 4.6 (30)	Melbourne Cricket Ground	24 September 1910	
1911	Leopold (4)	Collegians (5)	11.11 (77) d. 7.9 (51)	Melbourne Cricket Ground	16 September 1911	
1912	Beverley (1)	South Yarra (2)	7.9 (51) d. 4.4 (28)	Melbourne Cricket Ground	14 September 1912	
1913	Leopold (5)	Collingwood District (1)	6.14 (50) d. 3.11 (29)	Melbourne Cricket Ground	20 September 1913	
1914	South Yarra (3)	Collingwood District (2)	8.15 (63) d. 5.11 (41)	Melbourne Cricket Ground	19 September 1914	
1915	Collingwood District (1)	Leopold (4)	9.10 (64) d. 6.13 (49)	Richmond Cricket Ground	7 August 1915	
1916	(No season due to World War I)					
1917	(No season due to World War I)					
1918	(No season due to World War I)					
1919	(No season due to World War I)					
1920	Elsternwick (1)	Collegians (6)				
1921	University B (1)	University A (1)	9.13 (67) d. 9.8 (62)	University Oval	3 September 1921	
1922	University B (2)	Collegians (7)	10.11 (71) d. 7.15 (57)	University Oval	26 August 1922	
1923	Old Scotch (1)	University B (1)	17.11 (113) d. 12.7 (79)	Elsternwick Park	18 August 1923	
1924	Old Scotch (2)	Hampton (1)	11.6 (72) d. 7.13 (55)	Albert Cricket Ground	23 August 1924	
1925	Elsternwick (2)	Old Scotch (1)	6.15 (51) d. 3.12 (30)	University Oval	22 August 1925	
1926	Old Scotch (3)	Elsternwick (1)	9.16 (70) d. 7.16 (58)	Elsternwick Park	11 September 1926	
1927	Old Scotch (4)	University B (2)	19.11 (125) d. 13.12 (90)	Brighton Cricket Ground	17 September 1927	
1928	University B (3)	Old Melburnians (1)	15.19 (109) d 7.5 (47)	Yarra Park	8 September 1928	
1929	University B (4)	Old Melburnians (2)	9.10 (64) d. 5.26 (56)	Yarra Park	14 September 1929	
1930	Old Melburnians (1)	Elsternwick (2)	23.16 (154) d. 7.9 (51)			
1931	Old Scotch (5)	Elsternwick (3)	10.11 (71) d. 7.13 (55)			
1932	Old Scotch (6)	State Savings Bank (1)	13.18 (96) d. 10.8 (68)	Elsternwick Park		
1933	Old Scotch (7)	University Blacks (3)	15.16 (106) d. 10.14 (74)			
1934	Old Scotch (8)	University Blacks (4)	16.1 (97) d. 13.11 (89)			
1935	University Blacks (5)	Old Scotch (2)	16.12 (108) d. 12.20 (92)			
1936	Collegians (7)	State Savings Bank (2)	14.18 (102) d. 6.11 (47)			
1937	Collegians (8)	Ormond (1)	15.17 (107) d. 8.20 (68)			
1938	University Blacks (6)	State Savings Bank (3)	17.19 (121) d. 15.10 (100)			
1939	University Blacks (7)	Ormond (2)	15.18 (108) d. 10.8 (68)			
1940	(Season curtailed due to World War II)					
1941	(No season due to World War II)					
1942	(No season due to World War II)					
1943	(No season due to World War II)					
1944	(No season due to World War II)					
1945	(No season due to World War II)					
1946	University Blacks (8)	Old Scotch (3)	22.19 (151) d. 13.16 (94)			
1947	University Blacks (9)	Ormond (3)	17.20 (122) d. 17.11 (113)			
1948	University Blacks (10)	Old Melburnians (3)	15.11 (101) d. 7.14 (56)			
1949	University Blacks (11)	Ormond (4)	14.24 (108) d. 6.12 (48)			
1950	Ormond (1)	University Blacks (5)	9.12 (66) d. 9.8 (62)			
1951	Hampton Rovers (1)	Ormond (5)	7.12 (54) d. 7.7 (49)			
1952	University Blues (1)	Ormond (6)	20.1 (121) d. 8.16 (64)			
1953	Old Melburnians (2)	University Blues (2)	12.16 (88) d. 6.8 (44)			
1954	Old Melburnians (3)	University Blues (3)	9.19 (73) d. 9.14 (68)			
1955	Old Melburnians (4)	Ormond (7)	11.18 (84) d. 6.12 (48)			
1956	Ivanhoe (1)	Coburg (1)	6.14 (50) d. 5.12 (42)			
1957	Collegians (9)	University Blues (4)	13.12 (90) d. 2.12 (24)			
1958	Collegians (10)	Old Scotch (4)	9.6 (60) d. 8.6 (54)			
1959	Collegians (11)	Old Scotch (5)	14.12 (96) d. 11.8 (74)			
1960	University Blues (2)	Old Melburnians (4)	9.10 (64) d. 6.6 (42)			
1961	Collegians (12)	Old Melburnians (5)	17.9 (111) d. 9.13 (67)			
1962	Old Paradians (1)	MHSOB (1)	16.14 (110) d. 9.9 (63)			
1963	Old Paradians (2)	Ormond (8)	10.13 (73) d. 8.9 (57)			
1964	Old Paradians (3)	Old Xaverians (1)	10.11 (71) d. 9.13 (67)			
1965	University Blacks (12)	Coburg (2)	17.12 (114) d. 10.5 (65)			
1966	Old Paradians (4)	MHSOB (2)	12.9 (81) d. 11.6 (72)			
1967	Old Paradians (5)	Caulfield Grammarians (1)	16.15 (111) d. 13.15 (93)			
1968	Old Paradians (6)	Caulfield Grammarians (2)	17.23 (125) d. 7.8 (50)			
1969	Coburg (1)	Ormond (9)	13.17 (95) d. 12.12 (84)			
1970	Caulfield Grammarians (1)	Coburg (3)	14.18 (102) d. 15.10 (100)			
1971	Ormond (2)	University Blues (6)	8.14 (62) d. 4.16 (40)			
1972	Ormond (3)	Old Paradians (1)	9.13 (67) d. 8.13 (61)	Elsternwick Park	16 September 1972	
1973	Ormond (4)	St Bernard's (1)	12.13 (85) d. 8.7 (55)	Elsternwick Park	15 September 1973	
1974	University Blacks (13)	Ormond (10)	12.10 (82) d. 9.14 (68)	Elsternwick Park	14 September 1974	
1975	St Bernard's (1)	North Old Boys (1)	19.13 (127) d. 12.10 (82)	Elsternwick Park	20 September 1975	
1976	North Old Boys (1)	St Bernard's (2)	18.18 (126) d. 11.11 (77)	Elsternwick Park	18 September 1976	
1977	De La Salle (1)	North Old Boys (2)	9.20 (74) d. 11.5 (71)	Elsternwick Park	17 September 1977	
1978	Old Scotch (9)	North Old Boys (3)	16.16 (112) d. 16.11 (107)	Elsternwick Park	17 September 1978	
1979	De La Salle (2)	University Blues (7)	17.15 (117) d. 12.10 (82)	Elsternwick Park	16 September 1979	
1980	De La Salle (3)	University Blues (8)	11.14 (80) d. 7.18 (60)	Elsternwick Park	14 September 1980	
1981	Old Xaverians (1)	North Old Boys (4)	15.22 (112) d. 13.15 (91)	Elsternwick Park	20 September 1981	
1982	North Old Boys (2)	De La Salle (1)	19.7 (121) d. 8.15 (63)	Elsternwick Park	19 September 1982	
1983	De La Salle (4)	University Blues (9)	11.7 (73) d. 7.10 (52)	Elsternwick Park	18 September 1983	
1984	De La Salle (5)	Ormond (11)	13.14 (92) d. 6.19 (55)	Elsternwick Park	16 September 1984	
1985	Ormond (5)	De La Salle (2)	16.14 (110) d. 14.11 (95)	Elsternwick Park	22 September 1985	
1986	Collegians (13)	North Old Boys (5)	21.6 (132) d. 11.15 (81)	Elsternwick Park	21 September 1986	
1987	Ormond (6)	Old Xaverians (2)	15.11 (101) d. 12.12 (84)	Elsternwick Park	6 September 1987	
1988	Ormond (7)	Old Xaverians (3)	14.11 (95) d. 8.11 (59)	Elsternwick Park	18 September 1988	
1989	Ormond (8)	Collegians (8)	17.11 (113) d. 9.11 (65)	Elsternwick Park	24 September 1989	
1990	Ormond (9)	Collegians (9)	14.12 (96) d. 12.17 (89)	Elsternwick Park	15 September 1990	
1991	De La Salle (6)	North Old Boys (6)	12.10 (82) d. 11.11 (77)	Elsternwick Park	14 September 1991	
1992	Collegians (14)	De La Salle (3)	14.23 (107) d. 9.13 (67)	Elsternwick Park	20 September 1992	
1993	Collegians (15)	De La Salle (4)	11.13 (79) d. 7.19 (61)	Elsternwick Park	18 September 1993	
1994	Old Melburnians (5)	Collegians (10)	11.13 (79) d. 7.19 (61)	Elsternwick Park	17 September 1994	
1995	Old Xaverians (2)	University Blues (10)	15.11 (101) d. 2.5 (17)	Elsternwick Park	16 September 1995	
1996	Old Xaverians (3)	Collegians (11)	8.10 (58) d. 8.5 (53)	Elsternwick Park	22 September 1996	
1997	Old Xaverians (4)	Old Scotch (6)	10.13 (93) d. 9.13 (67)	Elsternwick Park	21 September 1997	
1998	Old Xaverians (5)	Old Scotch (7)	21.13 (139) d. 11.12 (78)	Elsternwick Park	20 September 1998	
1999	Old Xaverians (6)	Old Melburnians (6)	22.14 (146) d. 13.17 (95)	Elsternwick Park	18 September 1999	
2000	Old Xaverians (7)	St Bernard's (3)	22.14 (146) d. 16.5 (101)	Elsternwick Park	27 August 2000	
2001	Marcellin (1)	St Kevin's (1)	16.7 (103) d. 9.19 (73)	Elsternwick Park	23 September 2001	
2002	St Bernard's (2)	Old Xaverians (4)	20.15 (135) d. 15.14 (104)	Elsternwick Park	22 September 2002	
2003	Old Xaverians (8)	St Bernard's (4)	18.20 (128) d. 8.17 (65)	Elsternwick Park	21 September 2003	
2004	University Blues (3)	St Bernard's (5)	18.13 (121) d. 8.17 (65)	Elsternwick Park	19 September 2004	
2005	Old Xaverians (9)	University Blues (11)	13.7 (85) d. 11.10 (76)	Elsternwick Park	18 September 2005	
2006	Old Haileybury (1)	Old Xaverians (5)	13.8 (86) d. 9.9 (63)	Elsternwick Park	24 September 2006	
2007	Old Xaverians (10)	Old Brighton (1)	18.15 (123) d. 10.16 (76)	Elsternwick Park	23 September 2007	
2008	St Bedes/Mentone Tigers (1)	Collegians (12)	10.17 (77) d. 5.17 (47)	Elsternwick Park	20 September 2008	
2009	Old Xaverians (11)	De La Salle (5)	9.6 (60) d. 8.9 (57)	Elsternwick Park	20 September 2009	
2010	Old Xaverians (12)	Collegians (13)	11.8 (74) d. 7.12 (54)	Elsternwick Park	19 September 2010	
2011	Collegians (16)	St Bedes/Mentone Tigers (1)	18.20 (128) d. 14.8 (92)	Elsternwick Park	18 September 2011	
2012	Collegians (17)	Old Xaverians (5)	10.11 (71) d. 9.10 (64)	Elsternwick Park	23 September 2012	
2013	Old Xaverians (13)	St Bedes/Mentone Tigers (2)	13.17 (95) d. 6.9 (45)	Elsternwick Park	21 September 2013	
2014	University Blacks (14)	Collegians (14)	13.12 (90) d. 7.4 (46)	Elsternwick Park	20 September 2014	
2015	St Bernard's (3)	Old Trinity (1)	17.11 (113) d. 15.15 (105)	Ikon Park	20 September 2015	
2016	Old Xaverians (14)	Old Trinity (2)	9.7 (61) d. 7.12 (54)	Ikon Park	18 September 2016	
2017	St Kevin's (1)	Collegians (15)	10.10 (70) d. 9.13 (67)	Trevor Barker Oval	24 September 2017	
2018	St Kevin's (2)	Collegians (6)	12.13 (85) d. 11.14 (80)	Elsternwick Park	16 September 2018	
2019	University Blues (4)	St Kevin's (2)	18.8 (116) d. 10.16 (76)	Elsternwick Park	22 September 2019	
2020	No season due to the COVID-19 pandemic					
2021	Season curtailed due to the COVID-19 pandemic					
2022	St Kevin's (3)	Old Brighton (2)	5.16 (46) d. 3.6 (24)	Trevor Barker Oval	18 September 2022	
2023	Collegians (18)	St Kevin's (3)	19.16 (130) d. 6.9 (45)	Elsternwick Park	24 September 2023	
2024	Old Scotch (10)	Old Brighton (3)	14.11 (95) d. 10.17 (77)	Elsternwick Park	27 September 2024	
2025	Old Brighton (1)	Old Scotch (8)	10.17 (77) d. 7.10 (52)	Elsternwick Park	26 September 2025	
2026	University Blues (5)	Old Xaverians (6)	10.26 (86) d. 13.4 (82)	Elsternwick Park	25 September 2025	

=== Premier B ===
Premier B was known as B Section (or B Grade) until 2010.

Year	Premiers	Runners-up	Score	Venue	Date	Report
1923	Sandringham (1)	Murrumbeena (1)	8.11 (59) d. 8.7 (55)	University Oval	25 August 1923	
1924	Murrumbeena (1)	Old Trinity (1)	16.17 (113) d. 12.10 (82)	Beach Road Oval	22 September 1924	
1925	Old Caulfield Grammarians (1)	Teachers' College (1)	13.14 (92) d. 8.7 (55)	Yarra Park	12 September 1925	
1926	Collegians (1)	St Paul's Ascot Vale (1)	17.8 (110) d. 8.9 (57)	Tulip Street Reserve	18 September 1926	
1927	Murrumbeena (2)	Glen Huntly (1)	11.11 (77) d. 8.9 (57)	Elsternwick Park	10 September 1927	
1928	Brightonvale (1)	State Savings Bank (1)	10.17 (77) d. 9.8 (62)	Elsternwick Park	8 September 1928	
1929	Murrumbeena (3)	Black Rock (1)	17.15 (117) d. 13.12 (90)	Brighton Cricket Ground	14 September 1929	
1930	Teachers' College (1)	East Malvern (1)	17.19 (121) d. 13.7 (85)			
1931	Geelong (1)	Old Paradians (1)	14.8 (92) d. 9.16 (70)			
1932	Brunswick (1)	West Hawthorn (1)	11.14 (80) d. 10.10 (70)			
1933	Geelong (2)	Brighton TSOB (1)	12.17 (89) d. 7.10 (52)			
1934	ES&A Bank (1)	West Brunswick (1)	10.8 (68) d. 6.13 (49)			
1935	Teachers' College (1)	University Blues (1)	16.19 (115) d. 11.12 (78)			
1936	Ivanhoe (1)	Ormond (1)	16.16 (112) d. 9.15 (69)			
1937	Malvern (1)	Parkdale (1)	16.13 (109) 7.13 (55)			
1938	Old Melburnians (1)	Coburg (1)	13.10 (88) d. 12.10 (82)			
1939	Elsternwick (1)	Brunswick (1)	16.14 (110) d. 13.9 (87)			
1940	(Season curtailed due to World War II)					
1941	(No season due to World War II)					
1942	(No season due to World War II)					
1943	(No season due to World War II)					
1944	(No season due to World War II)					
1945	(No season due to World War II)					
1946	MHSOB (1)	Old Melburnians (1)				
1947	Hampton Rovers (1)	Old Melburnians (2)				
1948	Old Xaverians (1)	Brunswick (2)				
1949	Geelong (3)	University Blues (2)				
1950	Commonwealth Bank (1)	Collegians (1)				
1951	Old Paradians (1)	Alphington (1)				
1952	MHSOB (2)	Ivanhoe (1)				
1953	Kew (1)	Old Paradians (2)				
1954	Old Paradians (2)	State Savings Bank (2)				
1955	Coburg (1)	Old Scotch (1)				
1956	Collegians (2)	Power House (1)				
1957	Alphington (1)	Old Xaverians (1)				
1958	Old Paradians (3)	University Blacks (1)				
1959	Old Melburnians (2)	Commonwealth Bank (1)				
1960	UHSOB (1)	De La Salle (1)				
1961	MHSOB (3)	Ivanhoe (2)				
1962	Old Xaverians (2)	Alphington (2)				
1963	Coburg (2)	UHSOB (1)				
1964	University Blacks (1)	Commonwealth Bank (2)				
1965	Old Scotch (1)	Caulfield Grammarians (1)				
1966	Kew (2)	Ivanhoe (3)				
1967	University Blues (1)	North Old Boys (1)				
1968	Ormond (1)	Monash Blues (1)				
1969	Ivanhoe (2)	De La Salle (2)				
1970	Old Scotch (2)	St Bernard's (1)				
1971	Old Paradians (4)	North Old Boys (2)				
1972	Geelong (4)	Ivanhoe (4)				
1973	Reservoir Old Boys (1)	University Blacks (2)				
1974	Old Trinity (1)	Monash Blues (2)				
1975	De La Salle (1)	University Blues (3)				
1976	Marcellin (1)	Caulfield Grammarians (2)				
1977	Old Scotch (3)	Ivanhoe (5)				
1978	Old Melburnians (3)	Old Paradians (8)				
1979	AJAX (1)	Marcellin (1)				
1980	Old Xaverians (3)	Old Scotch (2)				
1981	University Blues (2)	Collegians (2)				
1982	Old Melburnians (4)	Ivanhoe (6)				
1983	Bulleen-Templestowe (1)	Kew (1)				
1984	St Bernard's (1)	Ivanhoe (7)				
1985	Marcellin (2)	Caulfield Grammarians (3)				
1986	Old Paradians (5)	Old Xaverians (2)				
1987	St Bernard's (2)	Marcellin (2)	19.10 (124) d. 12.20 (92)	Elsternwick Park	27 September 1987	
1988	Parkside (1)	Kew (2)				
1989	De La Salle (2)	Therry Penola (1)				
1990	Old Haileybury (1)	Old Melburnians (3)				
1991	St Bernard's (3)	Old Xaverians (3)				
1992	Old Trinity (2)	Old Brighton (1)				
1993	Old Melburnians (5)	Therry Penola (2)				
1994	Old Trinity (3)	University Blues (4)				
1995	Old Haileybury (2)	Mazenod (1)				
1996	Old Trinity (4)	Old Paradians (9)				
1997	Old Brighton (1)	St Kevin's Old Boys (1)				
1998	Marcellin (3)	Old Ivanhoe (1)				
1999	Old Trinity (5)	MHSOB (1)				
2000	Mazenod (1)	Old Brighton (2)				
2001	Old Ivanhoe (1)	De La Salle (3)				
2002	Old Melburnians (6)	Old Haileybury (1)				
2003	De La Salle (3)	Whitefriars (1)				
2004	St Kevin's Old Boys (1)	Collegians (3)				
2005	Old Ivanhoe (2)	De La Salle (4)	9.4 (58) d. 5.11 (41)			
2006	Collegians (3)	Old Brighton (3)	12.13 (85) d. 9.10 (64)			
2007	St Bedes/Mentone Tigers (1)	University Blacks (3)	12.11 (83) d. 10.10 (70)			
2008	Marcellin (4)	Old Essendon (1)	11.8 (74) d. 8.8 (56)			
2009	Old Melburnians (7)	Old Trinity (2)	18.21 (129) d. 12.11 (83)			
2010	Old Carey (1)	Old Haileybury (1)	19.14 (128) d. 14.6 (90)			
2011	Caulfield Grammarians (2)	St Bernard's (2)	17.12 (114) d. 12.9 (81)			
2012	University Blacks (2)	Beaumaris (1)	15.12 (102) d. 11.9 (75)	Elsternwick Park	22 September 2012	
2013	Old Brighton (2)	Old Trinity (3)	12.11 (83) d. 11.9 (75)	Elsternwick Park	15 September 2013	
2014	University Blues (3)	Old Carey (1)	20.22 (142) d. 10.7 (67)	Elsternwick Park	14 September 2014	
2015	St Kevin's Old Boys (2)	Old Melburnians (4)	13.18 (96) d. 13.7 (85)	Elsternwick Park	19 September 2015	
2016	Beaumaris (1)	St Bedes/Mentone Tigers (1)	14.17 (101) d. 10.10 (70)	Trevor Barker Oval	17 September 2016	
2017	Old Brighton (3)	Old Scotch (3)	11.13 (79) d. 6.7 (43)	Trevor Barker Oval	23 September 2017	
2018	St Bernard's (4)	Old Carey (2)	18.15 (123) d. 5.10 (40)	Elsternwick Park	15 September 2018	
2019	Caulfield Grammarians (3)	Old Scotch (4)	17.22 (124) d. 4.8 (32)	Elsternwick Park	21 September 2019	
2020	(No season due to the COVID-19 pandemic)					
2021	(Season curtailed due to the COVID-19 pandemic)					
2022	Old Haileybury (3)	University Blacks (4)	2.10 (22) d. 2.5 (17)	Elsternwick Park	17 September 2022	
2023	St Bernard's (5)	Fitzroy (1)	15.13 (103) d. 10.12 (72)	Elsternwick Park	23 September 2023	
2024	Old Haileybury (4)	De La Salle (5)	19.15 (129) d. 5.5 (35)	Trevor Barker Oval	22 September 2024	
2025	Old Trinity (6)	Caulfield Grammarians (4)	12.11 (83) d. 10.11 (71)	Trevor Barker Oval	20 September 2025	
2026	Collegians	De La Salle	10.19 (79) d. 9.13 (67)	Trevor Barker Oval	20 September 2026	

=== Premier C ===
Premier C was known as C Section (or C Grade) until 2010.

Year	Premiers	Runners-up	Score	Venue	Date	Report
1926	Brightonvale (1)	Glen Huntly (1)	12.11 (83) d. 8.14 (62)	Beach Road Oval	25 September 1926	
1927	State Savings Bank (1)	Oakleigh (1)	12.22 (94) d. 9.13 (67)	Tulip Street Reserve	17 September 1927	
1928	Black Rock (1)	Surrey Hills (1)	14.21 (105) d. 12.14 (86)	Brighton Cricket Ground	8 September 1928	
1929	East Malvern (1)	Old Paradians (1)	10.13 (73) d. 8.10 (58)	Murrumbeena	21 September 1929	
1930	Bentleigh District (1)	Brighton TSOB (1)				
1931	West Hawthorn (1)	Burwood (1)				
1932	Canterbury UC (1)	Dandenong KSP (1)				
1933	ES&A Bank (1)	West Brunswick				
1934	Ormond (1)	North Melbourne CBC				
1935	Ivanhoe (1)	UHSOB				
1936	Parkdale (1)	Malvern				
1937	Coburg (1)	Footscray TSOB				
1938	Old Xaverians (1)	University Blues				
1939	MHSOB (1)	St Paul's				
1940	(Season curtailed due to World War II)					
1941	(No season due to World War II)					
1942	(No season due to World War II)					
1943	(No season due to World War II)					
1944	(No season due to World War II)					
1945	(No season due to World War II)					
1946	Hampton Rovers (1)	Parkside				
1947	Commonwealth Bank (1)	Balwyn				
1948	Geelong (1)	Alphington				
1949	North Alphington (1)	Old Paradians				
1950	Kew (1)	State Savings Bank (1)				
1951	Myer (1)	Parkside				
1952	Coburg (2)	Elsternwick				
1953	Caulfield Grammarians (1)	Power House				
1954	Parkside (1)	Old Xaverians				
1955	Brunswick (1)	East Malvern				
1956	South Melbourne City (1)	Hampton Rovers				
1957	Old Geelong (1)	ES&A Bank				
1958	De La Salle (1)	Parkside				
1959	Power House (1)	UHSOB				
1960	MHSOB (2)	Parkside				
1961	State Savings Bank (2)	St Kevin's Old Boys				
1962	Kew (2)	West Brunswick				
1963	Parkside (2)	Caulfield Grammarians (1)				
1964	Kew (3)	Footscray TCOB				
1965	St Kilda CBOC (1)	St Kevin's Old Boys				
1966	Geelong (2)	North Old Boys				
1967	Alphington (1)	Monash Blues				
1968	Footscray TCOB (1)	St Bernard's				
1969	Commonwealth Bank (2)	Alphington				
1970	UHSOB (1)	Old Carey				
1971	Tooronga-Malvern (1)	Old Trinity				
1972	Reservoir Old Boys (1)	Assumption OC				
1973	Power House (2)	Fairfield	N/A (Note: The 1973 C Section Grand Final was scheduled to take place on 8 September 1973 at Harry Trott Oval, but the Grand Final was scratched and Power House was awarded the premiership after it was discovered that Fairfield had used an ineligible player in multiple games.)	Harry Trott Oval	8 September 1973	
1974	Marcellin (1)	Old Haileybury				
1975	St Kilda CBOC (2)	MHSOB				
1976	Old Melburnians (1)	Old Haileybury				
1977	Fawkner (1)	Parkside				
1978	Old Xaverians (2)	AJAX				
1979	Kew (4)	St Kilda CBOC				
1980	Old Brighton (1)	Geelong				
1981	Alphington (2)	Bulleen-Templestowe				
1982	Old Camberwell	Coburg				
1983	Caulfield Grammarians (2)	Parkside				
1984	St Kilda CBOC	Old Brighton				
1985	Fawkner	Therry Penola				
1986	Banyule	Old Trinity				
1987	Monash Blues	Kew	13.18 (96) d. 10.11 (71)	Elsternwick Park	5 September 1987	
1988	Old Melburnians	Old Brighton				
1989	Old Haileybury	Banyule				
1990	Old Mentonians	University Blacks				
1991	Whitefriars	Monash Blues				
1992	Fawkner	Bulleen-Templestowe				
1993	Mazenod	AJAX				
1994	St Kilda-South Caulfield (1)	MHSOB				
1995	Old Ivanhoe	Ivanhoe				
1996	St Kevin's Old Boys	St Kilda-South Caulfield (1)				
1997	Marcellin	North Old Boys				
1998	Hampton Rovers	Beaumaris				
1999	Whitefriars	Old Mentonians				
2000	Therry Penola	Beaumaris				
2001	Hampton Rovers	Old Essendon				
2002	Whitefriars	St Bedes/Mentone Tigers (1)				
2003	Beaumaris	Collegians				
2004	MHSOB	Caulfield Grammarians (2)				
2005	University Blacks	Beaumaris				
2006	St Bedes/Mentone Tigers (1)	AJAX				
2007	Old Camberwell	Old Carey				
2008	Ormond	Hampton Rovers				
2009	MHSOB	Oakleigh				
2010	Beaumaris	Caulfield Grammarians (3)				
2011	AJAX	Werribee Districts				
2012	Parkdale Vultures	Fitzroy	15.16 (106) d. 13.10 (88)	Trevor Barker Oval	22 September 2012	
2013	Old Ivanhoe	Mazenod				
2014	Hampton Rovers	Parkdale Vultures				
2015	Old Haileybury	Monash Blues				
2016	Mazenod	Peninsula Old Boys	13.15 (93) d. 8.11 (59)	Elsternwick Park	17 September 2016	
2017	Old Haileybury	Caulfield Grammarians (4)	14.10 (94) d. 6.10 (46)	Casey Fields	23 September 2017	
2018	Fitzroy (1)	Old Geelong	16.11 (107) d. 5.7 (37)	Trevor Barker Oval	15 September 2018	
2019	Williamstown CYMS	AJAX	11.12 (78) d. 9.6 (60)	Trevor Barker Oval	21 September 2019	
2020	(No season due to the COVID-19 pandemic)					
2021	(Season curtailed due to the COVID-19 pandemic)					
2022	Monash Blues	Old Geelong	8.9 (57) d. 5.6 (36)	Trevor Barker Oval	23 September 2022	
2023	Old Ivanhoe	Old Camberwell	14.20 (104) d. 9.8 (62)	Trevor Barker Oval	23 September 2023	
2024	Old Carey	Hampton Rovers	20.17 (137) d. 7.6 (48)	Trevor Barker Oval	21 September 2024	
2025	Beaumaris	AJAX	12.19 (81) d. 8.12 (60)	Trevor Barker Oval	21 September 2025	
2026	Parkdale Vultures	Fitzroy	15.8 (98) d. 13.14 (92)	Trevor Barker Oval	19 September 2026	

=== Division 1 ===
Division 1 was known as D Section (or D Grade) until 2000.

Year	Premiers	Runners-up	Score	Venue	Date	Report
1932	West Brunswick (1)	ES&A Bank				
1933	Ormond (1)	North Melbourne CBC				
1934	Ivanhoe (1)	UHSOB				
1935	Malvern (1)	Parkdale				
1936	Coburg (1)	Footscray TSOB				
1937	MHSOB (1)	Mt Carmel OC				
1938	Fairfield	St Paul's				
1939	Hampton Rovers	South Camberwell				
1940	(Season curtailed due to World War II)					
1941	(No season due to World War II)					
1942	(No season due to World War II)					
1943	(No season due to World War II)					
1944	(No season due to World War II)					
1945	(No season due to World War II)					
1946	(D Section did not exist)					
1947	(D Section did not exist)					
1948	Fairfield	North Alphington				
1949	Caulfield Grammarians (1)	Murrumbeena				
1950	East Malvern	Power House				
1951	Elsternwick	Parkdale				
1952	St Kevin's Old Boys	Caulfield Grammarians (1)				
1953	Footscray TSOB	ES&A Bank				
1954	Teachers' College	Fairfield				
1955	South Melbourne City	Glen Huntly				
1956	Old Geelong Grammarians	UHSOB				
1957	National Bank	De La Salle OC				
1958	Port Melbourne	Bellfield				
1959	Footscray TSOB	AJAX				
1960	St Kilda CBOC	St Kevin's OB				
1961	Caulfield Grammarians	West Brunswick				
1962	Fairfield	Old Carey				
1963	Old Haileybury	Monash University				
1964	St Bernard's	Old Brighton				
1965	North Melbourne CBCOB	Preston				
1966	Old Geelong Grammarians	Old Carey				
1967	St Patrick's	Hampton Rovers				
1968	National Bank	Tooroonga-Malvern				
1969	Old Haileybury	Assumption OC				
1970	Old Trinity	Fairfield				
1971	Fawkner	Hampton Rovers				
1972	Parkside	Old Brighton				
1973	Alphington	Marcellin				
1974	Brunswick	Old Ivanhoe				
1975	Fawkner	Hampton Rovers				
1976	Old Xaverians	AJAX				
1977	Old Brighton	Alphington				
1978	Old Camberwell	St Kevin's				
1979	Bulleen-Templestowe	MHSOB				
1980	Alphington	State Bank				
1981	Coburg	West Brunswick				
1982	Parkside	St Pius				
1983	Banyule	Fawkner				
1984	Therry CCOB	Thomastown				
1985	Old Trinity	MHSOB				
1986	Balaclava	Monash Blues				
1987	Old Ivanhoe	St Kevin's	21.10 (136) d. 19.12 (126)	Bentleigh	5 September 1987	
1988	Preston MBOB	Hampton Rovers				
1989	Thomastown	Old Mentonians				
1990	State Bank	Whitefriars				
1991	MHSOB	AJAX				
1992	Mazenod	Caulfield Grammarians				
1993	St Bedes/Mentone Tigers	Old Geelong				
1994	Old Ivanhoe	St Kevin's				
1995	Hampton Rovers	Thomastown				
1996	Monash Blues	St. Leos Emmaus				
1997	Beaumaris	Old Geelong				
1998	Whitefriars	Southbank				
1999	AJAX	Bulleen-Templestowe				
2000	Caulfield Grammarians	Old Essendon				
2001	Old Camberwell	Banyule				
2002	St Leos Emmaus Wattle Park	Mentone Amateurs				
2003	Monash Blues	AJAX				
2004	University Blacks	Banyule				
2005	Fitzroy Reds	Ormond				
2006	Old Carey	Rupertswood				
2007	Oakleigh	Hampton Rovers				
2008	Bulleen Templestowe	Old Geelong				
2009	Rupertswood	Fitzroy				
2010	Werribee Districts	Monash Blues				
2011	Parkdale Vultures	Banyule				
2012	North Old Boys/St Patrick's	Peninsula Old Boys				
2013	Hampton Rovers	Ormond				
2014	Williamstown CYMS	Therry Penola				
2015	Kew	Ormond				
2016	Old Geelong (3)	Old Mentonians	14.10 (94) d. 12.14 (86)	Coburg City Oval	10 September 2016	
2017	PEGS	St Mary's Salesian	15.14 (104) d. 14.7 (91)	Box Hill City Oval	16 September 2017	
2018	Ormond	Hampton Rovers	11.9 (75) d. 9.15 (69)	Trevor Barker Oval	8 September 2018	
2019	Preston Bullants (1)	UHS-VU	8.10 (58) d. 6.12 (48)	Box Hill City Oval	14 September 2019	
2020	(No season due to the COVID-19 pandemic)					
2021	(Season curtailed due to the COVID-19 pandemic)					
2022	PEGS	Old Camberwell	12.12 (84) d. 8.9 (57)	Trevor Barker Oval	10 September 2022	
2023	Glen Eira	Oakleigh	15.13 (103) d. 6.13 (49)	Trevor Barker Oval	16 September 2023	
2024	Prahran	Parkside	5.6 (36) d. 2.10 (22)	Martin Reserve	14 September 2024	
2025	Old Peninsula	Ormond	19.13 (127) d. 6.17 (53)	Box Hill City Oval	14 September 2025	
2026	Preston Bullants (2)	Kew	12.9 (81) d. 3.11 (29)	La Trobe University	12 September 2026	

=== Division 2 ===
Division 2 was known as E Section (or E Grade) until 2000. E Section was split into E Central, E East and E South from 1995 until 1997, then E Blue and E White from 1998 until 1999.

==== E Section ====
Year	Premiers	Runners-up	Score	Venue	Date	Report
1954	South Melbourne City	Preston				
1955	De La Salle	Old Geelong Grammarians				
1956	National Bank	Melburnian Blues				
1957	Port Melbourne	AJAX				
1958	St Kilda CBOC	ANZ Bank				
1959	Preston	Old Brighton				
1960	West Brunswick	Elsternwick				
1961	Old Carey	Preston				
1962	Monash University	Old Haileybury				
1963	St Bernard's	Glen Huntly				
1964	North Melbourne CBC	Old Geelong Grammarians				
1965	St Patrick's	Kooyong				
1966	AJAX	Old Ivanhoe				
1967	Assumption OC	Tooronga-Malvern				
1968	AMP Society	Old Trinity				
1969						
1970						
1971						
1972						
1973						
1974						
1975						
1976						
1977						
1978						
1979						
1980						
1981						
1982						
1983						
1984						
1985						
1986						
1987	State Bank	West Brunswick	21.12 (138) d. 6.8 (44)	Monash University	5 September 1987	
1988						
1989						
1990						
1991						
1992						
1993						
1994						

==== E Central ====
Year	Premiers	Runners-up	Score	Venue	Date	Report
1995						
1996						
1997						

==== E East ====
Year	Premiers	Runners-up	Score	Venue	Date	Report
1995						
1996						
1997						

==== E South ====
Year	Premiers	Runners-up	Score	Venue	Date	Report
1995						
1996						
1997						

==== E Blue ====
Year	Premiers	Runners-up	Score	Venue	Date	Report
1998						
1999						

==== E White ====
Year	Premiers	Runners-up	Score	Venue	Date	Report
1998						
1999						

==== Division 2 ====
Year	Premiers	Runners-up	Score	Venue	Date	Report
2000						
2001						
2002						
2003						
2004						
2005						
2006						
2007						
2008						
2009						
2010						
2011						
2012						
2013						
2014						
2015						
2016	Preston Bullants (1)	St John's	11.9 (75) d. 9.9 (63)	Casey Fields	10 September 2016	
2017	Prahran Assumption (1)	West Brunswick	10.11 (71) d. 6.10 (46)	Elsternwick Park	17 September 2017	
2018	UHS-VU	Old Paradians	14.17 (101) d. 6.10 (46)	Coburg City Oval	9 September 2018	
2019	Whitefriars	Brunswick	10.14 (74) d. 7.7 (49)	Box Hill City Oval	15 September 2019	
2020	(No season due to the COVID-19 pandemic)					
2021	(Season curtailed due to the COVID-19 pandemic)					
2022	Ivanhoe	West Brunswick	9.9 (63) d. 9.8 (62)	Trevor Barker Oval	11 September 2022	
2023	Parkside (1)	Old Yarra Cobras (1)	10.8 (68) d. 10.5 (65)	Coburg City Oval	17 September 2023	
2024	Elsternwick	Brunswick	4.17 (41) d. 3.10 (28)	La Trobe University	14 September 2024	
2025	St Mary's Salesian	Old Yarra Cobras	8.10 (58) d. 7.13 (55)	Carey Baptist Grammar School	14 September 2025	
2026	Power House	Whitefriars	10.17 (77) d. 8.10 (58)	Elsternwick Park	13 September 2026	

=== Division 3 ===
Division 2 was known as F Section (or F Grade) until 2000. F Section did not exist from 1995 until 1999 during the geographic split of E Section.

Year	Premiers	Runners-up	Score	Venue	Date	Report
1964	St Patrick's	Assumption				
1965	Reservoir Old Boys	Old Ivanhoe				
1966						
1967						
1968						
1969						
1970						
1971	Marcellin	Old Ivanhoe				
1972	Old Camberwell	Elsternwick				
1973	Fawkner	St Bede's				
1974	North Brunswick	Old Mentonians				
1975	Monash Whites	Heatherton				
1976	West Brunswick	Beverley Hills				
1977	St Bede's	Bulleen-Templestowe				
1978	Thornbury	Bulleen United				
1979						
1980						
1981						
1982						
1983						
1984						
1985						
1986						
1987	Aquinas (1)	Whitefriars	12.13 (85) d. 12.12 (84)		5 September 1987	
1988						
1989						
1990						
1991						
1992						
1993						
1994						
1995	(Division 3 did not exist)					
1996	(Division 3 did not exist)					
1997	(Division 3 did not exist)					
1998	(Division 3 did not exist)					
1999	(Division 3 did not exist)					
2000						
2001						
2002						
2003						
2004						
2005						
2006						
2007						
2008						
2009						
2010						
2011						
2012						
2013						
2014						
2015						
2016	Glen Eira (1)	Hawthorn	16.7 (103) d. 7.14 (56)	Coburg City Oval	11 September 2016	
2017	UHS-VU	Power House	13.14 (92) d. 9.17 (71)	Elsternwick Park	16 September 2017	
2018	Glen Eira	Hawthorn	10.12 (72) d. 8.9 (57)	Trevor Barker Oval	9 September 2018	
2019	Aquinas	Manningham Cobras	8.14 (62) d. 7.18 (60)	Garvey Oval	15 September 2019	
2020	(No season due to the COVID-19 pandemic)					
2021	(Season curtailed due to the COVID-19 pandemic)					
2022	South Melbourne Districts	Parkside	9.5 (51) d. 5.9 (39)	Garvey Oval	10 September 2022	
2023	Elsternwick	Hawthorn	21.19 (145) d. 12.6 (78)	Box Hill City Oval	16 September 2023	
2024	Canterbury	St John's	11.22 (88) d. 9.5 (59)	Martin Reserve	21 September 2024	
2025	Power House	North Brunswick	15.19 (109) d. 3.7 (25)	Preston City Oval	12 September 2025	
2026	Wattle Park	Richmond Central	23.14 (152) d. 9.6 (60)	Sir Douglas Nicholls Reserve	12 September 2026	

=== Division 4 ===
Division 4, which was known as G Section (or G Grade) until 2000, was abolished at the end of the 2023 season. G Section did not exist from 1995 until 1997 during the geographic split of E Section.

Year	Premiers	Runners-up	Score	Venue	Date	Report
1987	Bloods (1)	Port Colts	12.8 (80) d. 6.4 (40)	Elsternwick Park	23 August 1987	
1988						
1989						
1990						
1991						
1992						
1993	Oakleigh	Yarra Valley				
1994	Richmond Central	Chirnside Park				
1995	(Division 4 did not exist)					
1996	(Division 4 did not exist)					
1997	(Division 4 did not exist)					
1998	Hawthorn	Monash Gryphons				
1999	Eley Park	Albert Park				
2000	South Melbourne Districts	Bentleigh				
2001	Syndal Tally Ho	Swinburne University				
2002	Rupertswood	Werribee				
2003	UHS-VU	Mt Lilydale				
2004	Old Westbourne	Kew				
2005	Elsternwick	St Mary's				
2006						
2007						
2008						
2009						
2010						
2011						
2012						
2013						
2014						
2015						
2016	Westbourne Grammarians (1)	Point Cook	11.6 (72) d. 8.7 (55)	St Bernard's College	10 September 2016	
2017	Aquinas	Manningham Cobras	14.10 (94) d. 10.9 (69)	Garvey Oval	16 September 2017	
2018	North Brunswick	Parkside	15.11 (101) d. 9.11 (65)	Garvey Oval	8 September 2018	
2019	St Francis Xavier	Albert Park	15.4 (94) d. 7.14 (56)	Trevor Barker Oval	15 September 2019	
2020	(No season due to the COVID-19 pandemic)					
2021	(Season curtailed due to the COVID-19 pandemic)					
2022	La Trobe University	Swinburne University	11.11 (77) d. 9.8 (62)	Garvey Oval	11 September 2022	
2023	North Brunswick	Albert Park	10.9 (69) d. 8.6 (54)	Garvey Oval	17 September 2023	

== Women's premierships ==
=== Seniors ===
Year	Premier	Premier B	Division 1	Division 2	Division 3	Division 4	Division 5
2026	Old Scotch	Beaumaris	Power House	Richmond Central	Parkdale Vultures	Aquinas	Ormond
2025	Old Scotch	Old Brighton	Glen Eira / Old McKinnon	La Trobe University	St Mary's Salesian	Westbourne	6 sections
2024	Old Scotch	Old Geelong	Old Brighton	Glen Eira / Old McKinnon	Therry Penola	St Kevin's	6 sections
2023	St Kevin's	Monash Blues	Marcellin	Williamstown CYMS	AJAX	UHS-VU	6 sections
Year	Premier	Premier B	Premier C	Division 1	Division 2	Division 3	6 sections
2022	St Kevin's	Old Scotch	St Bedes/Mentone Tigers	Beaumaris	Hampton Rovers	MCC	6 sections
2021	(Season abandoned due to COVID-19)						
2020	(No competition due to COVID-19)						
Year	Premier	Premier B	Premier C	Division 1	Division 2	Division 3	Division 4
2019	St Kevin's	Caulfield Grammarians	Yarra Old Grammarians	Old Scotch	Therry Penola	Preston Bullants	Glen Eira/Old McKinnon
Year	Premier	Premier B Blue	Premier B White	Division 1	Division 2	Division 3	6 sections
2018	Melbourne University	St Mary's Salesian	Old Haileybury	Hawthorn	Whitefriars	Westbourne	6 sections
Year	Premier	Development Division 1	Development Division 2	Development Division 3	Development Division 4	5 sections	
2017	Marcellin	St Mary's Salesian	Old Camberwell	Mazenod	Hawthorn	5 sections	

== Women's grand finals ==
GF	Premiership decided by a grand final where a challenge was not needed
GF (R)	Premiership decided by a grand final replay, after the scheduled grand final was drawn
CF	Premiership decided by a challenge final under the Argus system
GF (N)	Premiership decided by a grand final because no team finished outright first after full season win–loss record
W/L	Premiership decided by full season win–loss record
NF	No grand final held

=== Premier ===
Year	Premiers	Runners-up	Score	Venue	Date	Report
2017	Marcellin (1)	St Kevin's (1)	3.9 (27) d. 2.8 (20)	Elsternwick Park	20 August 2017	
2018	Melbourne University (1)	Marcellin (1)	3.9 (27) d. 1.3 (9)	Elsternwick Park	19 August 2018	
2019	St Kevin's (1)	West Brunswick (1)	2.5 (17) d. 1.3 (9)	Elsternwick Park	18 August 2019	
2020	(No season due to the COVID-19 pandemic)					
2021	(Season curtailed due to the COVID-19 pandemic)					
2022	St Kevin's (2)	Kew (1)	5.9 (39) d. 2.4 (16)	Elsternwick Park	4 September 2022	
2023	St Kevin's (3)	Kew (2)	6.9 (45) d. 3.2 (20)	Elsternwick Park	17 September 2023	
2024	Old Scotch (1)	St Kevin's (2)	10.4 (64) d. 5.2 (32)	Elsternwick Park	22 September 2024	
2025	Old Scotch (2)	Caulfield Grammarians (1)	4.9 (33) d. 4.4 (28)	Elsternwick Park	21 September 2025	
2026	Old Scotch (3)	Caulfield Grammarians (2)	5.7 (37) d. 1.3 (9)	Elsternwick Park	20 September 2026	

=== Premier B ===
Premier B (B Section) was known as Women's Development Division 1 in 2017, and Premier B Blue in 2018

Year	Premiers	Runners-up	Score	Venue	Date	Report
2017	St Mary's Salesian (1)	West Brunswick (1)	3.2 (20) d. 3.1 (19)	Elsternwick Park	20 August 2017	
2018	St Mary's Salesian (2)	West Brunswick (2)	4.9 (33) d. 0.2 (2)	Marcellin College	19 August 2018	
2019	Caulfield Grammarians (1)	Old Xaverians (1)	2.2 (14) d. 0.0 (0)	Mentone Grammar School	18 August 2019	
2020	(No season due to the COVID-19 pandemic)					
2021	(Season curtailed due to the COVID-19 pandemic)					
2022	Old Scotch (1)	Fitzroy (1)	4.3 (27) d. 2.2 (14)	Elsternwick Park	14 August 2022	
2023	Monash Blues (1)	Old Yarra Cobras (1)	3.3 (21) d. 3.1 (19)	Elsternwick Park	16 September 2023	
2024	Old Geelong (1)	Fitzroy (2)	5.6 (36) d. 4.5 (29)	Elsternwick Park	1 September 2024	
2025	Old Brighton (1)	Old Melburnians (1)	9.6 (60) d. 5.7 (37)	Elsternwick Park	7 September 2025	
2026	Beaumaris (1)	Port Melbourne Chargers (1)	9.4 (58) d. 3.3 (21)	Kennedy Community Centre	6 September 2026	

=== Division 1 ===
Division 1 (C Section) was known as Women's Development Division 2 in 2017, Premier B White in 2018, and Premier C from 2019 to 2022

Year	Premiers	Runners-up	Score	Venue	Date	Report
2017	Old Camberwell (1)	Old Carey (1)	5.7 (37) d. 2.4 (16)	Trevor Barker Oval	19 August 2017	
2018	Old Haileybury (1)	Old Scotch (1)	4.8 (32) d. 2.7 (19)	Trevor Barker Oval	19 August 2018	
2019	Yarra Old Grammarians (1)	Brunswick (1)	3.6 (24) d. 0.3 (3)	Mentone Grammar School	18 August 2019	
2020	(No season due to the COVID-19 pandemic)					
2021	(Season curtailed due to the COVID-19 pandemic)					
2022	St Bedes/Mentone Tigers (1)	Parkdale Vultures (1)	6.3 (39) d. 1.2 (8)	Elsternwick Park	14 August 2022	
2023	Marcellin (1)	Beaumaris (1)	10.8 (68) d. 4.8 (32)	Elsternwick Park	3 September 2023	
2024	Old Brighton (1)	Marcellin (1)	5.9 (39) d. 2.6 (18)	Box Hill City Oval	1 September 2024	
2025	Glen Eira/Old McKinnon (1)	Monash Blues (1)	6.8 (44) d. 3.5 (23)	Moorleigh Reserve	6 September 2025	
2026	Power House (1)	Ormond (1)	8.3 (51) d. 4.4 (28)	Marcellin College	6 September 2026	

=== Division 2 ===
Division 2 (D Section) was known as Women's Development Division 3 in 2017, and Division 1 from 2018 to 2022

Year	Premiers	Runners-up	Score	Venue	Date	Report
2017	Mazenod (1)	Old Mentonians (1)	3.6 (24) d. 3.4 (22)	Elsternwick Park	20 August 2017	
2018	Hawthorn (1)	Ivanhoe (1)	4.8 (32) d. 1.2 (8)	Elsternwick Park	19 August 2018	
2019	Old Scotch (1)	Old Brighton (1)	11.10 (76) d. 1.2 (8)	Mentone Grammar School	18 August 2019	
2020	(No season due to the COVID-19 pandemic)					
2021	(Season curtailed due to the COVID-19 pandemic)					
2022	Beaumaris (1)	Old Camberwell (1)	5.3 (33) d. 1.3 (9)	Trevor Barker Oval	14 August 2022	
2023	Williamstown CYMS (1)	Parkdale Vultures (1)	10.9 (69) d. 2.11 (23)	Elsternwick Park	3 September 2023	
2024	Glen Eira/Old McKinnon (1)	Hampton Rovers (1)	9.11 (65) d. 1.4 (10)	Elsternwick Park	1 September 2024	
2025	La Trobe University (1)	Parkside (1)	3.9 (27) d. 3.6 (24)	Coburg City Oval	7 September 2025	
2026	Richmond Central (1)	De La Salle (1)	2.5 (17) d. 1.5 (11)	Marcellin College	6 September 2026	

=== Division 3 ===
Division 3 (E Section) was known as Women's Development Division 4 in 2017, Division 2 from 2018 to 2022

Year	Premiers	Runners-up	Score	Venue	Date	Report
2017	Hawthorn (1)	St Kevin's (1)	4.7 (31) d. 2.2 (14)	Trevor Barker Oval	19 August 2017	
2018	Whitefriars (1)	Old Melburnians (1)	7.0 (42) d. 2.9 (21)	Trevor Barker Oval	19 August 2018	
2019	Therry Penola (1)	Old Brighton (1)	7.6 (48) d. 6.6 (42)	Elsternwick Park	18 August 2019	
2020	(No season due to the COVID-19 pandemic)					
2021	(Season curtailed due to the COVID-19 pandemic)					
2022	Hampton Rovers (1)	Albert Park (1)	2.7 (19) d. 2.5 (17)	Trevor Barker Oval	14 August 2022	
2023	AJAX (1)	Power House (1)	5.12 (42) d. 2.3 (15)	Elsternwick Park	3 September 2023	
2024	Therry Penola (2)	La Trobe University (1)	7.8 (50) d. 1.8 (14)	Waverley Oval	1 September 2024	
2025	St Mary's Salesian (1)	Ormond (1)	5.7 (37) d. 5.5 (35)	Moorleigh Reserve	6 September 2025	
2026	Parkdale Vultures (1)	Old Haileybury (1)	2.8 (20) d. 2.3 (15)	Trevor Barker Oval	5 September 2026	

=== Division 4 ===
Division 4 (F Section) was known as Division 3 from 2018 to 2022

Year	Premiers	Runners-up	Score	Venue	Date	Report
2018	Westbourne (1)	Preston Bullants (1)	4.6 (30) d. 2.7 (19)	Trevor Barker Oval	19 August 2018	
2019	Preston Bullants (1)	Hampton Rovers (1)	7.1 (43) d. 3.5 (23)	Mentone Grammar School	18 August 2019	
2020	(No season due to the COVID-19 pandemic)					
2021	(Season curtailed due to the COVID-19 pandemic)					
2022	MCC (1)	Bulleen Templestowe (1)	2.7 (19) d. 1.2 (8)	Trevor Barker Oval	14 August 2022	
2023	UHS-VU (1)	Old Carey (1)	4.2 (26) d. 2.3 (15)	Coburg City Oval	3 September 2023	
2024	St Kevin's (1)	MCC (1)	2.5 (17) d. 2.4 (16)	Elsternwick Park	8 September 2024	
2025	Westbourne (2)	Old Yarra Cobras (1)	4.5 (29) d. 2.5 (17)	Coburg City Oval	7 September 2025	
2026	Aquinas (1)	Mazenod (1)	6.4 (40) d. 1.2 (8)	Waverley Oval	5 September 2026	

=== Division 5 ===
Division 5 (G Section) was known as Division 4 from 2019 to 2021

Year	Premiers	Runners-up	Score	Venue	Date	Report
2019	Glen Eira/Old McKinnon (1)	AJAX (1)	6.8 (44) d. 3.2 (20)	Mentone Grammar School	18 August 2019	
2020	(No season due to the COVID-19 pandemic)					
2021	(Season curtailed due to the COVID-19 pandemic)					
2026	Ormond (1)	Preston Bullants (1)	5.8 (38) d. 3.9 (27)	Carey Baptist Grammar School	5 September 2026	

== Premierships by club ==
=== Men's seniors ===
Club	Seniors							
Club	Premier (A section)	Premier B (B section)	Premier C (C section)	Div 1 (D section)	Div 2 (E section)	Div 3 (F section)	Div 4 (G section)	Total
AJAX	0	1	1	1	2	0	0	5
Alphington	0	1	2	2	0	0	–	5
Aquinas	0	0	0	0	0	2	2	4
Assumption	0	0	0	0	1	0	0	1
Balaclava (AMP Society)	0	0	0	1	2	–	–	3
Banyule	0	0	1	1	1	1	–	4
Beaumaris	0	1	2	1	1	0	0	5
Bentleigh	0	0	1	0	0	1	–	2
Beverley	1	–	–	–	–	–	–	1
Black Rock	0	0	1	–	–	–	–	1
Brighton	1	–	–	–	–	–	–	1
Brightonvale	0	1	1	–	–	–	–	2
Brunswick	0	1	1	1	0	1	–	4
Brunswick (North Melbourne CBCOB)	2	0	0	2	1	1	0	6
Bulleen United	0	0	0	0	1	1	–	2
Bulleen-Templestowe	0	1	2	0	3	–	–	6
Canterbury	0	0	0	0	0	0	1	1
Canterbury Utd Churches	0	0	1	–	–	–	–	1
Caulfield Grammarians	1	3	2	3	1	0	0	10
Chadstone (Syndal Tally-Ho)	0	0	0	0	0	0	1	1
Coburg	1	2	2	2	–	–	–	7
Collegians	18	4	0	0	0	0	0	22
Collingwood District	1	–	–	–	–	–	–	1
Commonwealth Bank	0	1	2	–	–	–	–	3
De La Salle	6	3	1	0	1	0	0	11
East Malvern	0	0	1	1	–	–	–	2
Eley Park	0	0	0	0	0	0	1	1
Elsternwick	2	1	0	1	0	2	1	7
ES & A Bank	0	1	1	–	–	–	–	2
Fairfield	0	0	0	3	1	–	–	4
Fawkner	0	0	3	1	1	1	–	6
Fitzroy	0	0	1	0	0	0	0	1
Fitzroy Reds (University Reds)	0	0	0	1	1	3	0	5
Footscray TSOB	0	0	1	2	0	1	–	4
Geelong	0	4	2	–	–	–	–	6
Glen Eira	0	0	0	1	0	2	–	3
Glenhuntly	0	0	0	0	1	–	–	1
Hawthorn	0	0	0	0	0	0	1	1
Heatherton	0	0	0	0	2	–	–	2
Hampton Rovers	1	1	4	3	0	0	0	9
Ivanhoe	0	3	1	1	1	–	–	6
Kew	0	2	4	1	1	1	0	9
La Trobe Uni	0	0	0	0	2	3	2	7
Leopold	5	–	–	–	–	–	–	5
Marcellin	1	5	2	0	0	1	0	9
Malvern	0	1	0	1	–	–	–	2
Mazenod	0	0	2	1	1	1	0	5
Mentone	0	0	0	0	1	–	–	1
MHSOB	0	3	4	2	0	0	0	9
Monash Blues (Monash Uni)	0	0	2	2	1	0	0	5
Monash Gryphons	0	0	0	0	0	0	1	1
Monash Whites	0	0	0	0	0	1	–	1
Murrumbeena	0	3	–	–	–	–	–	3
Myer	0	0	1	–	–	–	–	1
National Bank	0	0	0	2	1	–	–	3
North Alphington	0	0	1	–	–	–	–	1
North Brunswick	0	0	0	0	1	1	2	4
Oakleigh	0	0	0	1	1	2	1	5
Old Brighton	0	3	1	1	0	0	0	5
Old Camberwell	0	0	2	2	1	1	0	6
Old Carey	0	1	1	1	2	0	0	4
Old Geelong	0	0	1	3	2	0	0	6
Old Haileyburians	1	3	3	2	0	0	0	9
Old Ivanhoe	0	2	3	2	1	0	0	8
Old Melburnians	5	7	3	0	0	0	0	15
Old Paradians	6	4	0	0	1	0	0	11
Old Scotch	9	3	0	0	0	0	0	12
Old Trinity	0	6	0	2	0	0	0	8
Old Xaverians	14	3	2	1	0	0	0	20
Ormond	9	1	2	2	0	0	0	14
Parkdale	0	0	1	–	–	–	–	1
Parkdale Vultures	0	0	2	1	0	0	0	3
Parkside	0	1	2	2	1	–	–	6
PEGS (Old Essendon)	0	0	0	2	0	2	0	4
Port Melbourne	0	0	0	1	1	–	–	2
Powerhouse	1	0	0	1	0	1	1	4
Prahran (Prahran Assumption)	0	0	0	0	1	1	0	2
Preston	0	0	0	0	1	–	–	1
Preston Bullants (Northern Blues)	0	0	0	1	1	1	1	4
Preston MBOB	0	0	0	1	–	–	–	1
Reservoir OB	0	1	1	–	–	–	–	2
Richmond Central	0	0	0	0	0	0	1	1
Rupertswood	0	0	0	1	0	0	1	2
Salesian	0	0	0	0	1	–	–	1
South Melbourne City	0	0	0	1	1	–	–	2
South Melbourne Districts	0	0	0	0	1	2	1	4
Sandringham	0	1	–	–	–	–	–	1
South Mornington	0	0	0	0	0	0	1	1
South St Kilda	4	–	–	–	–	–	–	4
South Yarra	3	–	–	–	–	–	–	3
Southbank	0	0	0	0	1	–	–	1
St Bedes	0	0	0	0	0	1	0	1
St Bedes/Mentone Tigers	1	1	1	1	0	0	0	4
St Bernard's	3	5	0	1	1	0	0	10
St Francis Xavier	0	0	0	0	0	0	2	2
St John's	0	0	0	0	1	1	0	2
St Kevin's	3	2	1	1	0	0	0	7
St Kilda CBCOB	0	0	3	1	1	–	–	5
St Kilda City	0	0	1	–	–	–	–	1
St Kilda South Caulfield	0	0	1	–	–	–	–	1
St Mary's	0	0	0	0	0	2	0	2
St Patrick's	0	0	0	1	2	–	–	3
St Pius	0	0	0	0	0	1	–	1
State Bank (State Savings Bank)	0	0	2	1	2	0	0	5
Swinburne Uni	0	0	0	0	0	1	0	1
Tooronga-Malvern	0	0	1	–	–	–	–	1
Teachers' College	0	2	0	1	–	–	–	4
Therry Penola (Therry CCOB)	0	0	1	1	2	0	0	4
Thomastown	0	0	0	1	1	–	–	2
Thornbury	0	0	0	0	0	1	–	1
UHS-VU (UHSOB)	0	1	1	0	1	1	2	6
University	2	–	–	–	–	–	–	2
University Blacks (University B)	12	2	1	1	1	2	0	19
University Blues (University A)	5	3	0	0	0	0	0	8
Wattle Park (St Leo's)	0	0	0	1	0	1	1	3
Werribee	0	0	0	1	1	0	0	2
West Brunswick	0	0	0	1	2	3	2	8
West Hawthorn	0	0	1	–	–	–	–	1
Westbourne (Old Westbourne)	0	0	0	0	0	1	2	3
Whitefriars	0	0	3	1	2	–	–	6
Williamstown CYMS	0	0	1	1	1	2	0	5
Yarra Old Grammarians	0	0	0	0	1	2	1	4

=== Women's seniors ===
Club	Seniors							
Club	Premier	Premier B (B Blue)	Premier C (B White)	Div 1	Div 2	Div 3	Div 4	Total
AJAX	0	0	0	0	0	1	0	1
Beaumaris	0	0	0	1	0	0	0	1
Caulfield Grammarians	0	1	0	0	0	0	0	1
Glen Eira/Old McKinnon	0	0	0	1	1	0	1	3
Hawthorn	0	0	0	1	0	0	1	2
La Trobe University	0	0	0	0	1	0	0	1
Marcellin	1	0	0	1	0	0	0	2
Mazenod	0	0	0	0	0	1	0	1
MCC	0	0	0	0	0	1	0	1
Melbourne University	1	0	0	0	0	0	0	1
Monash Blues	0	1	0	0	0	0	0	1
Old Brighton	0	1	0	1	0	0	0	2
Old Camberwell	0	0	0	0	1	0	0	1
Old Geelong	0	1	0	0	0	0	0	1
Old Scotch	3	1	0	1	0	0	0	5
Preston Bullants	0	0	0	0	0	1	0	1
St Kevin's	3	0	0	0	0	0	1	4
St Mary's Salesian	0	1	0	1	0	1	0	3
Therry Penola	0	0	0	0	1	1	0	2
UHS-VU	0	0	0	0	0	0	1	1
Westbourne Grammarians	0	0	0	0	0	1	1	2
Whitefriars	0	0	0	0	1	0	0	1
Williamstown CYMS	0	0	0	0	1	0	0	1
Yarra Old Grammarians	0	0	1	0	0	0	0	1
