= 1940 VAFA season =

45th season of the Victorian Amateur Football Association

- Date: ended 22 June 1940
- Teams: 34

The 1940 VAFA season was the 45th season of the Victorian Amateur Football Association (VAFA). The season was curtailed on 22 June without premierships awarded as a result of World War II, and the next season was not held until 1946.

This was the only time the VAFA had curtailed a season until 2021, when competition was suspended due to the impact of the COVID-19 pandemic.

== Association membership ==
Prior to the start of the season, Brightonvale, Geelong and Old Brightonians withdrew from the competition (with Brightonvale folding entirely), while Black Rock District, Pascoe Vale and Power House were admitted. However, Black Rock District withdrew prior to the start of the season. The 1940 season set a new record for the number of VAFA teams competing.

== World War II ==
It initially appeared that World War II would not heavily affect the VAFA. This was despite many players joining the Second Australian Imperial Force (AIF) at the end of the 1939 season, and other players joining during the 1940 season.

However, on 3 June 1940, the VAFA executive announced that the season would be abandoned "owing to the present critical situation overseas and the necessity of our young men preparing themselves to play their part in the defence of the Empire".

The executive's decision was immediately opposed by a number of clubs, including Glen Huntly, South Camberwell and State Savings Bank, who advocated for continuing the season until the government requested a cessation.

Over the following days, a petition asking the executive to reconsider its decision was signed by 19 clubs, however the decision was not changed and the season ceased following the games held on Saturday, 22 June.

The VAFA did not resume playing until 1946. Around 3,000 VAFA players and officials served in World War II.

== Other notable events ==
- Former Northcote VFA captain-coach Alex Gray joined State Savings Bank as coach.
- Brunswick player W. Mason was suspended for two games after being found guilty of charging A.N. Ellis (Coburg) on 4 May. Additionally, the VAFA reprimanded Ellis for "not being frank in his evidence".
- South Camberwell player J. Davison was suspended for two games after using "insulting languague" towards an umpire.

== A Section ==
1940 A Section season
- Teams: 10
- Minor premiers: University Blacks
- Leading goalkicker: R. Flegg (Ormond − 51 goals)

=== Ladder ===
University Blacks and Collegians both finished with the same amount of points and one loss each, with the Blacks ahead on percentage. The article from The Herald included the premiership points for all clubs, excluding State Savings Bank.

| Pos | Team | Pld | W | L | D | PF | PA | PP | Pts |
|---|---|---|---|---|---|---|---|---|---|
| 1 | University Blacks | | | 1 | | | | | 24 |
| 2 | Collegians | | | 1 | | | | | 24 |
| | Ormond | | | | | | | | 20 |
| | Coburg | | | | | | | | 20 |
| | Ivanhoe | | | | | | | | 16 |
| | Brunswick | | | | | | | | 12 |
| | Elsternwick | | | | | | | | 12 |
| | Malvern | | | | | | | | 8 |
| | Old Scotch | | | | | | | | 4 |
| | State Savings Bank | | | | | | | | ? |

Rules for classification: 1) points; 2) percentage; 3) number of points for.

== B Section ==
1940 B Section season
- Teams: 6

=== Ladder ===
| Pos | Team | Pld | W | L | D | PF | PA | PP | Pts |
|---|---|---|---|---|---|---|---|---|---|
| | Old Paradians | | | | | | | | |
| | Footscray TSOB | | | | | | | | |
| | MHSOB | | | | | | | | |
| | Parkside | | | | | | | | |
| | St Paul's (Ascot Vale) | | | | | | | | |
| | Old Melburnians | | | | | | | | |

Rules for classification: 1) points; 2) percentage; 3) number of points for.

== C Section North ==
1940 C Section North season
- Teams: 8

=== Ladder ===
The final game between Myer and Fairfield was abandoned.

| Pos | Team | Pld | W | L | D | PF | PA | PP | Pts |
|---|---|---|---|---|---|---|---|---|---|
| | Alphington | | | | | | | | |
| | Heidelberg West | | | | | | | | |
| | Pascoe Vale | | | | | | | | |
| | UHSOB | | | | | | | | |
| | Parkside | | | | | | | | |
| | Power House | | | | | | | | |
| | Myer | | | | | | | | |
| | Fairfield | | | | | | | | |

Rules for classification: 1) points; 2) percentage; 3) number of points for.

== C Section South ==
1940 C Section South season
- Teams: 10

=== Ladder ===
The final game between Caulfield Grammarians and South Caulfield was abandoned.

| Pos | Team | Pld | W | L | D | PF | PA | PP | Pts |
|---|---|---|---|---|---|---|---|---|---|
| | Brighton TSOB | | | | | | | | |
| | Mt Carmel Old Collegians | | | | | | | | |
| | Glen Huntly | | | | | | | | |
| | Murrumbeena | | | | | | | | |
| | Hampton Rovers | | | | | | | | |
| | East Malvern | | | | | | | | |
| | Sandringham | | | | | | | | |
| | South Camberwell | | | | | | | | |
| | Caulfield Grammarians | | | | | | | | |
| | South Caulfield | | | | | | | | |

Rules for classification: 1) points; 2) percentage; 3) number of points for.
