= 1929 MAFA season =

34th season of the Metropolitan Amateur Football Association

- Date: 27 April − 21 September 1929
- Teams: 30

The 1929 MAFA season was the 34th season of the Metropolitan Amateur Football Association (MAFA), an Australian rules football competition played in the state of Victoria. The season began on 27 April and concluded on 21 September, with 30 teams participating across three divisions under a promotion and relegation system.

== Background ==
The MAFA changed the structure of the final series, with the first-placed team (minor premiers) playing the fourth-placed team in the semi-finals, while the second-placed team played their third-placed team. Prior to this, first played third and second played fourth. This change occurred several years before the Victorian Football League (VFL, now AFL) used the same system for finishing positions. As a modified version of the Argus finals system, the minor premiers still had the right to challenge the winner of the finals series for the premiership, but only if its home-and-away win–loss record was strictly better than that of the team it was challenging.

== Association membership ==
Five new clubs − Bentleigh District, East Malvern, Melbourne High School Old Boys (MHSOB), Old Ivanhoe and Old Paradians − entered the MAFA in C Section. Flinders Naval Base left the MAFA to re-enter the Peninsula Football League (PFL), while Oakleigh and Pascoe Vale had been expelled during the 1928 season.

The MAFA sought to stop the admission of further "B" teams for the 1929 season, and Teachers' College withrew "Teachers' College B" as a result. Sandringham B had already withdrawn from the MAFA late in the 1928 season. However, Glen Huntly was permitted to keep its "Glen Huntly B" team.

== A Section ==
1929 MAFA A Section season
- Date: 27 April − 14 September 1929
- Teams: 10
- Premiers: University B 4th A Section premiership
- Minor premiers: Old Scotch; 4th A Section minor premiership
- Best and fairest: K. Elder (State Savings Bank)
- Leading goalkicker: C.D. Chandler (State Savings Bank − 75 goals)

=== Ladder ===
Pos	Team	Pld	W	L	D	PF	PA	PP	Pts	Qualification
1	Old Scotch	18							56	Finals series
2	State Savings Bank	18							52	Finals series
3	University B (P)	18							50	Finals series
4	Old Melburnians	18							44	Finals series
5	Elsternwick	18							42	
6	Brightonvale	18							36	
7	University A	18							30	
8	Collegians	18							26	
9	St Paul's Ascot Vale	18							16	Relegation
10	Glen Huntly	18							4	Relegation

(P) Premiers; (E) Expelled; (W) Withdrawn

=== Finals ===
1929 MAFA A Section Grand Final
Saturday, 14 September	University B	def.	Old Melburnians	Yarra Park
0.1 (1); 2.4 (16); 4.9 (33); 9.10 (64)	Q1; Q2; Q3; Final	0.7 (7); 2.14 (26); 2.20 (32); 5.26 (56)

== B Section ==
1929 MAFA B Section season
- Date: 27 April − 14 September 1929
- Teams: 10
- Premiers: Murrumbeena; 3rd B Section premiership
- Minor premiers: Black Rock; 1st B Section minor premiership
- Best and fairest: F. Brooks (Teachers' College)
- Leading goalkicker: W. Collister (Murrumbeena − 107 goals)

=== Ladder ===
Pos	Team	Pld	W	L	D	PF	PA	PP	Pts	Qualification
1	Black Rock	18	14	4	0	1534	1251	122.6	56	Finals series
2	Surrey Hills	18	13	5	0	1430	1178	121.3	52	Finals series
3	Murrumbeena (P)	18	11	7	0	1805	1489	127.8	44	Finals series
4	Old Haileybury-Trinity	18	10	8	0	1662	1485	111.9	40	Finals series
5	Brunswick	18	10	8	0	1461	1353	107.9	40	
6	Geelong	18	10	8	0	1664	1575	105.6	40	
7	Old Caulfield Grammarians	18	6	12	0	1492	1693	88.1	24	
8	Teachers' College	18	6	12	0	1608	1965	80.3	24	
9	Old Xaverians	18	6	12	0	1227	1589	77.2	24	Relegation
10	Sandringham	18	4	14	0	1220	1532	79.6	16	Relegation

(P) Premiers; (E) Expelled; (W) Withdrawn

=== Finals ===
1929 MAFA B Section Grand Final
Saturday, 14 September	Black Rock	def. by	Murrumbeena	Brighton Cricket Ground
13.12 (90)	Q1; Q2; Q3; Final	17.15 (117)

== C Section ==
1929 MAFA C Section season
- Date: 27 April − 21 September 1929
- Teams: 10
- Premiers: East Malvern; 1st C Section premiership
- Minor premiers: Old Paradians; 1st C Section minor premiership
- Best and fairest: T. Cargill (West Hawthorn)
- Leading goalkicker: Allan La Fontaine (Old Paradians − 146 goals)

Old Paradians full-forward Allan La Fontaine kicked 146 goals for the home-and-away season (152 including finals), which was easily a record in any MAFA division since the competition began in 1892. This included kicking 20 of his club's 24 goals against Kingsville in round 18.

=== Ladder ===
Pos	Team	Pld	W	L	D	PF	PA	PP	Pts	Qualification
1	Old Paradians	18	14						56	Finals series
2	Burwood	18							52	Finals series
3	Bentleigh District	18							48	Finals series
4	East Malvern (P)	18							48	Finals series
5	South Caulfield	18							48	
6	West Hawthorn	18							40	
7	Kingsville	18							36	
8	Glen Huntly B	18							12	
9	MHSOB	18							12	
10	Old Ivanhoe	18							8	

(P) Premiers; (E) Expelled; (W) Withdrawn

=== Finals ===
1929 MAFA C Section Grand Final
Saturday, 21 September	Old Paradians	def. by	East Malvern	Murrumbeena
2.1 (13); 4.4 (24) 8.10 (58)	Q1; Q2; Q3; Final	5.4 (30); 6.9 (45) 10.13 (73)
