= 1927 MAFA season =

32nd season of the Metropolitan Amateur Football Association

- Date: 30 April − 17 September 1927
- Teams: 30

The 1927 MAFA season was the 32nd season of the Metropolitan Amateur Football Association (MAFA), an Australian rules football competition played in the state of Victoria. The season began on 30 April and concluded on 17 September, with 30 teams participating across three divisions under a promotion and relegation system.

== Association membership ==
Seven clubs − Black Rock, Flinders Naval Base (also referred to as Flinders Naval Depot or Naval Base Flinders), Kingsville Rovers, Oakleigh, Pascoe Vale, State Savings Bank and West Hawthorn − entered the MAFA in 1927. Glen Huntly entered a second team (also known as "Glen Huntly B"), while Elsternwick and Old Melburnians both withdrew their second teams.

Sandringham Juniors also appears to have left the MAFA following the 1926 season, with Sandringham District entering the competition.

All new teams entered C Section, with the exception of Flinders Naval Base and Sandringham District, which were both admitted into B Section.

== Notable events ==
- Hampton secretary E. F. Voight received a life ban from the MAFA after striking a Brightonvale official and attempting to strike another member of Brightonvale's committee following a match between the two clubs on 23 July 1927.
- Following the C Section grand final, Oakleigh was suspended from the MAFA because of the conduct of its supporters.

== A Section ==
1927 MAFA A Section season
- Date: 30 April − 17 September 1927
- Teams: 10
- Premiers: Old Scotch; 4th A Section premiership
- Minor premiers: Old Scotch; 3rd A Section minor premiership
- Best and fairest: Keith Rigg (Collegians − 6 votes)
- Leading goalkicker: J.J. Green (University B − 86 goals)

Old Scotch won the A Section premiership for the fourth time and the second year in a row, defeating University B by 35 points in the grand final.

=== Ladder ===
| Pos | Team | Pld | W | L | D | PF | PA | PP | Pts | Qualification |
|---|---|---|---|---|---|---|---|---|---|---|
| 1 | Old Scotch (P) | 18 | 16 | 2 | 0 | | | | 64 | Finals series |
| 2 | University B | 18 | 14 | 4 | 0 | | | | 56 | Finals series |
| 3 | Elsternwick | 18 | 13 | 5 | 0 | | | | 52 | Finals series |
| 4 | University A | 18 | 11 | 7 | 0 | | | | 44 | Finals series |
| 5 | St Paul's Ascot Vale | 18 | 10 | 8 | 0 | | | | 40 | |
| 6 | Old Melburnians | 18 | 10 | 8 | 0 | | | | 40 | |
| 7 | Collegians | 18 | 8 | 10 | 0 | | | | 32 | |
| 8 | Old Caulfield Grammarians | 18 | 8 | 10 | 0 | | | | 16 | |
| 9 | Geelong | 18 | 4 | 14 | 0 | | | | 16 | Relegation |
| 10 | Teachers' College | 18 | 0 | 18 | 0 | | | | 0 | Relegation |

Rules for classification: 1) points; 2) percentage; 3) number of points for.
(P) Premiers

=== Finals ===
1927 MAFA A Section Grand Final
Saturday, 17 September | Old Scotch | def. | University B | Brighton Cricket Ground
0.7 (7); 10.7 (67); 13.7 (85); 19.11 (125) | Q1; Q2; Q3; Final | 7.5 (47); 9.5 (59); 11.12 (78); 13.12 (90) | Umpires: Cave
Barnett 5, Swan 4, Staley, Moran 3, Wickers 3, McLorinan | Goals | Green 6, Cussen 3, Peverill 2, Horan, Cawley
Fergie, Cathcurt, Paterson, Gordon, Neil Law, Vickers, Barnett | Best | Horan, Cussen, Clements, Sharp, Turnbridge, King

== B Section ==
1927 MAFA B Section season
- Date: 30 April − 10 September 1927
- Teams: 10
- Premiers: Murrumbeena; 2nd B Section premiership
- Minor premiers: Murrumbeena; 2nd B Section minor premiership
- Best and fairest: A. Lundy (Murrumbeena − 6 votes)
- Leading goalkicker: A. Lundy (Murrumbeena − 91 goals)

This was Hampton's final season in the MAFA, with the club joining the VFL Sub-Districts for the 1928 season.

=== Ladder ===
| Pos | Team | Pld | W | L | D | PF | PA | PP | Pts | Qualification |
|---|---|---|---|---|---|---|---|---|---|---|
| 1 | Murrumbeena (P) | 18 | | | | | | | 56 | Finals series |
| 2 | Glen Huntly | 18 | | | | | | | 56 | Finals series |
| 3 | Brightonvale | 18 | | | | | | | 56 | Finals series |
| 4 | Flinders Naval Base | 18 | | | | | | | 52 | Finals series |
| 5 | Hampton | 18 | | | | | | | 36 | |
| 6 | Old Xaverians | 18 | | | | | | | 32 | |
| 7 | Sandringham | 18 | | | | | | | 32 | |
| 8 | Sandringham District | 18 | | | | | | | 20 | |
| 9 | Old Haileybury | 18 | | | | | | | 12 | Relegation (Note: Both Old Haileybury and Old Trinity were ultimately not relegated to C Section in 1928 after merging to form the Old Haileybury-Trinity Football Club.) |
| 10 | Old Trinity | 18 | | | | | | | 8 | Relegation |

Rules for classification: 1) points; 2) percentage; 3) number of points for.
(P) Premiers

=== Finals ===
1927 MAFA B Section Grand Final
Saturday, 10 September | Murrumbeena | def. | Glen Huntly | Elsternwick Park
11.11 (77) | Q1; Q2; Q3; Final | 8.9 (57)

== C Section ==
1927 MAFA C Section season
- Date: 30 April − 17 September 1927
- Teams: 10
- Premiers: State Savings Bank; 1st C Section premiership
- Minor premiers: State Savings Bank; 1st C Section minor premiership
- Best and fairest: T. Cargill (West Hawthorn − 6 votes)
- Leading goalkicker: L. Cruickshank (Oakleigh − 81 goals)

=== Ladder ===
| Pos | Team | Pld | W | L | D | PF | PA | PP | Pts | Qualification |
|---|---|---|---|---|---|---|---|---|---|---|
| 1 | State Savings Bank (P) | 18 | | | | | | | 66 | Finals series |
| 2 | Brunswick | 18 | | | | | | | 62 | Finals series |
| 3 | Oakleigh | 18 | | | | | | | 58 | Finals series |
| 4 | Black Rock | 18 | | | | | | | 44 | Finals series |
| 5 | West Hawthorn | 18 | | | | | | | 42 | |
| 6 | Pascoe Vale | 18 | | | | | | | 32 | |
| 7 | Kingsville Rovers | 18 | | | | | | | 24 | |
| 8 | South Caulfield | 18 | | | | | | | 24 | |
| 9 | Glen Huntly B | 18 | | | | | | | 4 | |
| 10 | Teachers' College B | 18 | | | | | | | 4 | |

Rules for classification: 1) points; 2) percentage; 3) number of points for.
(P) Premiers

=== Finals ===
1927 MAFA C Section Grand Final
Saturday, 17 September | State Savings Bank | def. | Oakleigh | Tulip Street Reserve
1.4 (10); 8.14 (62); 8.16 (64); 12.22 (94) | Q1; Q2; Q3; Final | 3.4 (22); 3.6 (24); 8.12 (60); 9.13 (67) | Umpires: Hacking
Gillam 3, Moloney 2, Arthur 2, Cocks 2, Proctor, McRae, Chambers | Goals | Cruickshank 3, Serong, McCarthy, Pratt, Reid, Palmer, Stafferd
Cocks, Proctor, Elder | Best | Considine, Colleson, Higgins

=== Club best and fairest ===
| Club | Winner | Ref |
|---|---|---|
| Black Rock | | |
| Brunswick | | |
| Glen Huntly | | |
| Kingsville Rovers | | |
| Pascoe Vale | | |
| South Caulfield | | |
| State Savings Bank | | |
| Teachers' College | | |
| West Hawthorn | T. Cargill | |
