= Halsall (surname) =

Halsall is a toponymic surname of English origin, derived from the village of Halsall in Lancashire.

Notable people with this surname include:

- Alan Halsall (born 1982), English actor
- Albert Halsall (1942–2011), English rugby league footballer
- Billy Halsall (1897–1968), English footballer
- Cuthbert Halsall (died 1619), English politician
- Dano Halsall (born 1963), Swiss swimmer
- Eric Halsall (1920–1996), English countryman, author and television presenter
- Francesca Halsall (born 1990), British swimmer
- Guy Halsall (born 1964), historian
- Hector Halsall (born 1900), English rugby league footballer
- Martin Halsall (born 1984), English rugby union player
- Matthew Halsall, jazz musician
- Mick Halsall (born 1961), English footballer
- Norman Halsall (born 1935), English cricketer
- Richard Halsall (born 1968), Zimbabwean cricketer
- Ollie Halsall (1949–1992), British guitarist
- Penny Halsall or Penny Jordan (1946–2011), English writer
- Peter Halsall (born 1958), Australian rules footballer
- Wally Halsall (1912–1996), English footballer
- William Halsall (born 1841), American painter

== See also ==
- Halsell, another surname with similar spelling
