= 1928 MAFA season =

33rd season of the Metropolitan Amateur Football Association

- Date: 28 April − 8 September 1928
- Teams: 30

The 1928 MAFA season was the 33rd season of the Metropolitan Amateur Football Association (MAFA), an Australian rules football competition played in the state of Victoria. The season began on 28 April and concluded on 8 September, with 30 teams participating across three divisions under a promotion and relegation system.

== Association membership ==
Burwood and Surrey Hills were admitted into the MAFA, while Hampton left the MAFA to join the VFL Sub-Districts. Old Haileybury and Old Trinity merged to form the Old Haileybury-Trinity Football Club, avoiding relegation from B Section after the clubs finished ninth and tenth respectively in 1927. Oakleigh was readmitted after being suspended from the MAFA at the end of the 1927 season.

On 17 February 1928, Sandringham (which had been formed in August 1927), Sandringham District and the Sandringham United Football Club amalgamated to form a new Sandringham Football Club. The club entered two teams in the MAFA and one team in the Federal Football Association (FFA) junior competition.

Geelong had been automatically suspended prior to the start of the 1928 season after its delegate failed to attend three consecutive MAFA meetings, but the club was readmitted prior to round 1 after giving assurances that the offence would not occur again.

=== Pascoe Vale expulsion ===
Pascoe Vale was expelled from the MAFA on 23 July over its conduct during a match against South Caulfield. The allegations included that Pascoe Vale players used "disgraceful" language in the changing room, that two players tripped and elbowed their opponents repeatedly, that players were continually arguing and making threats, that the Pascoe Vale supporters refused to leave the field when obstructing the play, and that Pascoe Vale supporters made "dire threats" against umpire Hacking following the match.

Earlier in the season, Pascoe Vale player C. Warden was expelled from the MAFA after punching an umpire in the back of the head during a match against Kingsville.

=== Oakleigh expulsion ===
Oakleigh was expelled from the MAFA on 20 August because of its "disgraceful" conduct during a match against Teachers' College on 11 August.

=== Sandringham B withdrawal ===
Sandringham B withdrew from C Section in August after having a record score kicked against them.

== Notable events ==
- A proposal to rename the MAFA to the Victorian Amateur Football Association (VAFA) was unanimously defeated at a meeting. The competition would ultimately change its name to the VAFA five years later for the 1933 season.

== A Section ==
1928 MAFA A Section season
- Date: 28 April − 8 September 1928
- Teams: 10
- Premiers: University B 3rd A Section premiership
- Minor premiers: University B
- Leading goalkicker: J.J. Green (University B − 110 goals)

=== Ladder ===
Pos	Team	Pld	W	L	D	PF	PA	PP	Pts	Qualification
1	University B (P)	18	16	1	1	2104	1203	174.9	66	Finals series
2	Old Scotch	18	16	1	1	2055	1330	154.5	66	Finals series
3	Elsternwick	18	11	7	0	1569	1395	112.5	55	Finals series
4	Old Melburnians	18	11	7	0	1702	1516	112.3	44	Finals series
5	Collegians	18	9	9	0	1706	1694	100.7	36	
6	St Paul's Ascot Vale	18	8	10	0	1253	1404	89.2	32	
7	University A	18	7	11	0	1586	1553	102.1	28	
8	Glen Huntly	18	6	12	0	1278	1612	79.3	24	
9	Murrumbeena	18	5	13	0	1625	1917	84.8	20	Relegation
10	Old Caulfield Grammarians	18	0	18	0	1295	2419	53.3	0	Relegation

Rules for classification: 1) points; 2) percentage; 3) number of points for.
(P) Premiers; (E) Expelled; (W) Withdrawn

=== Finals ===
1928 MAFA A Section Grand Final
Saturday, 8 September	University B	def.	Old Melburnians	Yarra Park
4.6 (30); 6.10 (46); 12.15 (87); 15.19 (109)	Q1; Q2; Q3; Final	4.2 (26); 5.1 (31); 6.5 (41); 7.5 (47)
Green 6, Cussen 3, Moran 2, Peverill, Whitehead, McMahon, Treadwell	Goals	Ewing 4, McKnight, Hallo, D. Guthrie
Lee, Green, Mitchell, Harvie, McMahon, King, McAuliffe	Best	Hailo, D. Ward, Atkins, Rutherford, McKnight, Turner

== B Section ==
1928 MAFA B Section season
- Date: 28 April − 8 September 1928
- Teams: 10
- Premiers: Brightonvale; 1st B Section premiership
- Minor premiers: Brightonvale; 1st B Section minor premiership
- Leading goalkicker: J. Graydon (Brightonvale − 85 goals)

=== Ladder ===
Pos	Team	Pld	W	L	D	PF	PA	PP	Pts	Qualification
1	Brightonvale (P)	18								Finals series
	Sandringham	18								Finals series
	State Savings Bank	18								Finals series
	Old Xaverians	18								Finals series
	Old Haileybury-Trinity	18								
	Geelong	18								
	Brunswick	18								
	Flinders Naval Base	18								
	Teachers' College	18								
−	Oakleigh (E)	16								

Rules for classification: 1) points; 2) percentage; 3) number of points for.
(P) Premiers; (E) Expelled; (W) Withdrawn

=== Finals ===
1928 MAFA B Section Grand Final
Saturday, 8 September	Brightonvale	def.	State Savings Bank	Elsternwick Park
4.5 (29); 6.8 (44); 9.16 (70); 10.17 (77)	Q1; Q2; Q3; Final	3.1 (19); 5.4 (34); 7.5 (47); 9.8 (62)
Hartley 3, J. Graydon 2	Goals	Arthur 2, Delbridge 2, Peart 2
Hull, Hall, Lilburne, Murphy, Simpson, Masson	Best	Coutts, Drinin, Arthur, Lawn, Daniels, Elder

== C Section ==
1928 MAFA C Section season
- Date: 28 April − 8 September 1928
- Teams: 10
- Premiers: Black Rock; 1st C Section premiership
- Minor premiers: Black Rock; 1st C Section minor premiership
- Leading goalkicker: L. Hardstaff (Black Rock − 96 goals)

=== Ladder ===
Pos	Team	Pld	W	L	D	PF	PA	PP	Pts	Qualification
1	Black Rock (P)	18								Finals series
2	Surrey Hills	18								Finals series
	Kingsville	18								Finals series
	South Caulfield	18								Finals series
	Teachers' College B	18								
	Glen Huntly B	18								
	Burwood	18								
	West Hawthorn	18								
−	Pascoe Vale (E)									
−	Sandringham B (W)									

Rules for classification: 1) points; 2) percentage; 3) number of points for.
(P) Premiers; (E) Expelled; (W) Withdrawn

=== Finals ===
1928 MAFA C Section Grand Final
Saturday, 8 September	Black Rock	def.	Surrey Hills	Brighton Cricket Ground
1.3 (9); 5.11 (41); 6.13 (49); 14.21 (105)	Q1; Q2; Q3; Final	4.5 (29); 6.8 (44); 11.12 (78); 12.14 (86)
Hardstaff 4, McGain 2	Goals
Hardstaff, McGain, Vaux, Ross, Hirst, Challis	Best

=== Club leadership ===
Club	Coach	Leadership group			Ref
Club	Coach	Captain(s)	Vice-captain(s)	Other leader(s)	Ref
Black Rock		McGain			
Burwood					
Glen Huntly B					
Kingsville					
Pascoe Vale					
Sandringham B					
South Caulfield					
Surrey Hills					
Teachers' College B					
West Hawthorn					
