= Halsall (disambiguation) =

Halsall is a village in Lancashire, England.

Halsall may also refer to:

- Halsall (surname), derived from the village of Halsall
- Halsall railway station, a disused railway station in Halsall

== See also ==
- Halsell
