= Halsell =

Halsell is a surname. Notable people with the surname include:

- Grace Halsell (1923–2000), American journalist and writer
- Harry H. Halsell (Harry Hurrinden Halsell) (1860–1957), American cattle rancher and writer in North Texas and Oklahoma
- James D. Halsell (born 1956), retired United States Air Force officer and a former NASA astronaut
- John Edward Halsell (1826–1899), U.S. Representative from Kentucky

== See also ==
- Lou Halsell Rodenberger (1926–2009), Texas author, educator, professor, and journalist
- Halsell, Texas, unincorporated community 10 miles southwest of Henrietta in west central Clay County, Texas, United States
- Halsall (disambiguation)
