= University Oval =

University Oval is the name of several sporting fields:

- Australia
  - University Oval, Adelaide
  - University Oval, Melbourne
  - University Oval, Sydney
- New Zealand
  - University Oval, Dunedin
- South Africa
  - Absa Puk Oval, Potchefstroom, formerly known as University Oval
- United States
  - Old Oval, former stadium and a central lawn on the Syracuse University campus, formerly known as University Oval
