= Peter Halsall =

Australian rules footballer

Personal information
- Full name: Peter Halsall
- Born: 6 January 1958 (age 68)
- Original team: Pascoe Vale/Paramount
- Height: 179 cm (5 ft 10 in)
- Weight: 73.5 kg (162 lb)

Playing career^{1}
Years	Club	Games (Goals)
1978	Carlton	2 (2)
- ^{1} Playing statistics correct to the end of 1978.

Peter Halsall (born 6 January 1958) is a former Australian rules footballer who played with Carlton in the Victorian Football League (VFL).
