= Brunswick Amateurs Football Club =

Brunswick Amateurs

Names
- Full name: Brunswick Amateurs Football Club
- Nickname: Lions

Club details
- Founded: 1926; 100 years ago
- Dissolved: Late 2001; 25 years ago
- Ground: Fleming Park

Uniforms
Home

The Brunswick Amateurs Football Club, nicknamed the Lions, was an Australian rules football club based in the Melbourne suburb of Brunswick East. The club competed in the Victorian Amateur Football Association (VAFA) almost continuously from 1926, winning a total of six senior premierships.

In 2001, the club merged with Broadmeadows Power to form the Brunswick Power Football Club, which competed in the Western Region Football League (WRFL) until the end of 2007.

== History ==
=== Brunswick Amateurs ===
Brunswick Amateurs was formed by past members of the Brunswick Presbyterian Young Men's Club in 1926, entering the Metropolitan Amateur Football Association (MAFA, later VAFA) the same year in C Section. The club made its won its first premiership in 1932, defeating West Hawthorn by 10 points in the B Section grand final, and entered A Section for the first time in 1933. Old Scotch full-forward Bill Pearson kicked a record 30 goals against Brunswick in a 1934 A Section match.

The club was based at Dunstan Reserve in Brunswick West in its early years. At one point in 1939, the VAFA instructed the club to find another home ground to play at as it was in a "shocking condition". They were defeated by Elsternwick later that year in the B Section grand final where a melee also took place, resulting in Brunswick being warned by the VAFA about "drastic action" if a similar incident happened again.

Brunswick won its second premiership in 1955, defeating East Malvern by 32 points in the C Section grand final.

At the end of the 1994 season, Brunswick left the VAFA and joined the Footscray District Football League (FDFL).

On 8 June 1997, Brunswick captain-coach Danny Hall was stabbed to death during a street brawl. He had previously played for Preston, Moomba Park, Broadford and Southbank as a ruckman, and played in Brunswick's 1992 VAFA E Section premiership and the VAFA's representative side in 1993. Brunswick's vice-captain and another player were also stabbed but survived.

In 1999, Brunswick returned to the VAFA in D4 Section. The club remained in D4 Section in 2000, but withdrew from senior competition and entered the VAFA's Club XVIII social competition in 2001.

=== Brunswick Power ===
In late 2001, Brunswick were struggling to find players and made the decision to merge with Broadmeadows Power (also known as Broady Power), a club run by Indigenous Australians, to form the Brunswick Power Football Club. The club played in Club XVIII North Section in 2002 before being promoted to D4 Section for the 2003 season.

After one senior season in the VAFA, Brunswick Power moved to the Western Region Football League (WRFL) in 2004, competing in Division 2 and playing its home games at Fleming Park in Brunswick East.

In 2005, 80% of the club's 180 registered players were Indigenous, while the remaining 20% were from other backgrounds, including Lebanese and Greek. However, their on-field performances were poor, including a 59.28 (382) to 2.4 (16) loss to Central Altona in round 16.

During the 2006 season, Brunswick Power was suspended by the WRFL for fielding unregistered players. (Note: The article "Footy clubs out" published by the Williamstown Star erroneously states its publication date as 30 April 2008. All other sources indicate the suspension took place on 20 July 2006.) The club returned to the WRFL for the 2007 season, but only won a single match and folded at the end of the season.

== Seasons ==
Premiers	Grand Finalist	Minor premiers	Finals appearance	Wooden spoon	Division leading goalkicker	Division best and fairest

=== Seniors ===
Year	League	Division	Finish	W	L	D	Coach	Captain	Best and fairest	Leading goalkicker	Ref
1926	MAFA	A Section	4th	8	6	0					
1927	MAFA	C Section	2nd								
1928	MAFA	B Section									
1929	MAFA	B Section	5th	10	8	0					

== See also ==
- Fitzroy Stars Football Club
