= Grace Halsell =

American journalist and writer

Grace Halsell (May 7, 1923 – August 16, 2000) was an American journalist and writer.

== Early life and education ==
The daughter of writer Harry H. Halsell, she studied at Texas Tech University from 1939 to 1942. During the 1940s, she was briefly married to Andy Fournier, the chief of detectives in the Fort Worth Police Department.

== Career ==
Halsell worked for several newspapers between 1942 and 1965, including the Lubbock Avalanche-Journal, the Fort Worth Star-Telegram, and the Washington bureau of the Houston Post. She covered both the Korean and Vietnam Wars as a reporter, and was a White House speech writer for President Lyndon B. Johnson from 1965 to 1968.

She wrote 10 books, several of which involved her "passing" as a member of a racial or ethnic minority. For Soul Sister (1969), she used vitiligo-corrective medication to darken her skin and live as an African American for several months. In 1973, she published Bessie Yellowhair, in which she tried to pass as a member of the Navajo. For 1978's The Illegals, she disguised herself as a Mexican immigrant.

== Death ==
In 2000, she died in Washington, D.C. of complications from treatment for multiple myeloma. She bequeathed her papers to the Mary Couts Burnett Library at Texas Christian University in Fort Worth, Texas. Some of her work is housed at Boston University's Howard Gotlieb Archival Research Center.

== Books ==
- Halsell, Grace (1969). Soul Sister: The Journal of a White Woman Who Turned Herself Black and Went to Live and Work in Harlem and Mississippi. New York: The World Publishing Company. OCLC 730258394.
- Evers, Charles (1971). Evers: A Biography of Charles Evers. Introduction by Grace Halsell. New York: The World Publishing Company. OCLC 909098159.
- Halsell, Grace; Jordan, Winthrop D. (1972). Black/White Sex. New York: Morrow. OCLC 360442.
- Halsell, Grace (1973). Bessie Yellowhair. New York: Morrow. ISBN 978-0-688-00200-8.
- Halsell, Grace (1976). Los Viejos: Secrets of Long Life from the Sacred Valley. Emmaus, PA: Rodale Press. ISBN 978-0-87857-135-2.
- Halsell, Grace (1978). The Illegals. New York: Stein and Day. ISBN 978-0-8128-2464-3.
- Halsell, Grace (1981). Journey to Jerusalem. New York: Macmillan. ISBN 978-0-02-085360-2.
- Halsell, Grace (1986). Prophecy and Politics: The Secret Alliance Between Israel and the U.S. Christian Right. Chicago: Lawrence Hill Books. ISBN 978-0-88208-210-3.
- Halsell, Grace (1996). In Their Shoes: A White Woman's Journey Living as a Black, Navajo, and Mexican Illegal. Fort Worth, Texas: Texas Christian University Press. ISBN 978-0-87565-170-5.
- Halsell, Grace (1999). Forcing God's Hand: Why Millions Pray for a Quick Rapture—and Destruction of Planet Earth. Beltsville, MD: International Graphics. ISBN 978-0-9674013-1-7.
  - Revised and enlarged edition 2003 ISBN 978-1-59008-015-3 included transcript of CBS 60 Minutes episode broadcast October 6, 2002 "Zion's Christian soldiers; how conservative Christians see Israel's role in bringing on the Second Coming of Christ."
