= Harry H. Halsell =

Harry H. Halsell (Harry Hurrinden Halsell; October 1, 1860 – February 3, 1957) was an American cattle rancher in North Texas and Oklahoma, and also a prolific writer of books about ranching life. He was the son of Texas rancher James Thompson Halsell and Maria Louise (Trimble) Halsell.

He was born in Clarksville, Texas, and was married twice, first to Julia (last name unknown) about 1885 (no known children were born to this marriage), then to Ruth Eleanor Shanks on March 10, 1908, in Fort Worth, Texas. He and his second wife had two sons and four daughters, including author Grace Halsell. He died in Fort Worth, and he and his second wife are buried in Decatur, Texas.

== Books ==
- Cowboys and Cattleland (1937)
- Memories of Old Chisholm Trail (1939)
- Romance of the West (1939)
- Ranger (1942)
- Prairie Flower (1943)
- The Old Cimmaron (1944)
- Trailing On (1945)
- The Philosophy of Life (1946)
- My Autobiography (1948)
