= Martin Halsall =

English rugby union player

- Born: Martin Halsall; 25 December 1984 (age 41) Blackpool, England
- Height: 1.81 m (5 ft 11 in)
- Weight: 116 kg (18 st 4 lb)
- School: Kirkham Grammar School

Rugby union career
- Position: Prop
Senior career
Years	Team	Apps	(Points)
2003–2010	Sale Sharks		
2010–2011	Nottingham		

Martin Halsall (born 25 December 1984 in Blackpool, England), is a rugby union player for Nottingham R.F.C. in the RFU Championship. He plays as a tighthead prop and started his career with Sale Sharks, debuting for the first team in 2004. In the 2005–2006 season, Halsall made 1 appearance as Sale Sharks won their first ever Premiership title. In December 2010, Halsall left Sale to play for Nottingham in the hope of playing more first-team matches. Halsall retired in May 2011 following neck injuries.
