= South Caulfield Football Club =

Names
- Full name: South Caulfield Football Club

Club details
- Founded: 1957; 69 years ago
- Dissolved: 29 March 1962; 63 years ago
- Ground: Princes Park

The South Caulfield Football Club was an Australian rules football club based in the Melbourne suburb of Caulfield South. It competed in the Federal District Football League (FDFL) until merging with Brighton to form Brighton-Caulfield in the Victorian Football Association (VFA).

== History ==
=== Origins ===
The Camden Town Football Club was based in the South Caulfield area and had been in existence from at least 1898. In 1910, the club entered a side in the Federal Football Association (FFA, later FDFL and FFL) junior competition, and won the premiership in 1911.

After World War I, the club resumed and changed its name to South Caulfield, joining the Victorian Junior Football Association (VJFA) and winning the reserves premiership in 1922.

In 1926, South Caulfield joined the Metropolitan Amateur Football Association (MAFA, later the VAFA), and remained in the competition until the end of the curtailed 1940 season. Following World War II, the club joined the CYMS Football Association (CYMSFA) and changed its name to South Caulfield CYMS.

While the senior team was in the Amateurs, in 1939 a junior side was formed and entered the FDFL's B grade competition under its original name of Camden.

Camden continued to field a team in the wartime competition from 1941, and, following the war, were runners-up in 1945 and 1948, losing to Moorabbin on both occasions.

After their near-success in the 1940s, the club slowly began to fall down the ladder. Their last attempt at success was competing in a playoff for the 1952 grand final, before finishing last in 1954 and near last in 1955 and 1956.

=== New club and merger ===
In 1957, Camden and South Caulfield CYMS merged to form the new South Caulfield Football Club, playing at Princes Park. Their time was not successful in the FDFL, spending most of its time near the bottom of the ladder.

On 29 March 1962, the Brighton Football Club, which had been struggling in the VFA, suddenly announced it had amalgamated with South Caulfield to form a club known as Brighton-Caulfield, following two weeks of negotiations between the clubs and facilitated by the VFA administration, which keen not to lose its eighteenth team.

South Caulfield had a home ground at Princes Park on Hawthorn Road which, while primitive, was fenced and met VFA standards, and it had enough players to field teams in four grades – both of which Brighton lacked. The negotiations were carried out secretly, and the FDFL was entirely surprised when the amalgamation was announced.

Brighton-Caulfield competed for three seasons before eventually moving to the suburb of Caulfield and becoming the Caulfield Football Club in the mid-1960s. Caulfield remained in the VFA until the end of the 1987 season.

== Seasons ==
Premiers	Grand Finalist	Minor premiers	Finals appearance	Wooden spoon	Division leading goalkicker	Division best and fairest

=== South Caulfield (original) ===
Year	League	Division	Finish	W	L	D	Coach	Captain	Best and fairest	Leading goalkicker	Ref
1926	MAFA	A Section	8th								
1927	MAFA	C Section	7th								
1928	MAFA	C Section									
1929	MAFA	C Section	5th								
