= Melbourne High School Old Boys Football Club =

Melbourne High School Old Boys

Names
- Full name: Melbourne High School Old Boys Football Club
- Nickname(s): Unicorns, MHSOB

Club details
- Founded: 24 April 1928; 98 years ago
- Colours
- Competition: VAFA
- President: Kane Smith
- Coach: Sean Lester
- Captain: Will Cardwell
- Ground: Melbourne High School Oval

Uniforms
Home

Other information
- Official website: mhsobfc.com.au

The Melbourne High School Old Boys Football Club (MHSOB), nicknamed the Unicorns, is an Australian rules football club based in the Melbourne suburb of South Yarra.

The club is part of the Melbourne High School Old Boys Association (MHSOBA), an organisation run primarily by alumni of Melbourne High School. In addition to football, MHSOBA also has cricket and field hockey clubs.

As of 2024, MHSOB competes in Division 2 of the Victorian Amateur Football Association (VAFA).

== History ==
The team's founding in August 1907 was an unofficial game between the club and the school. The school side won by 58 points, but the Old Boys returned the next year to play the match again. The game became a yearly fixture. In 1912 the MHSOBFC had its first victory over past students. The games were discontinued during both World Wars, but continued to be played between them.

In 1923, the club proposed to make the move to the Metropolitan Amateur Association, but it was not until 1929 that the club entered the premiership points race. On 24 April 1928, the football club was formally established. It was fairly successful, albeit in a low grade, early in its history. A constant finals contender, it finally won the D grade in 1937, earning promotion. It won the C grade in 1939, and then after won the B grade in 1946. Since then has moved intermittently between the B and A grades barring a decline in the 1980s.

In 1939, as the MHSOB was in the midst of its rise to the A grade, the U19 club was formed. This club was immediately successful, winning the premiership in 1943 and 1945. The club did not win a premiership during the 50s, but in the 60s it became a formidable force. It won the premiership in 1960, 1961, 1962, 1963 and 1964. The five-year record run has not been matched again, with the U19s winning only two more premierships: in 1985 and 1998. In total, the U19s have won nine times.

== Honours ==
=== Senior Competition Best and Fairest Awards ===
- J.N. Woodrow Medal (A Section) – I.Turnbull 1962; J.Nelson 1964–65 (3 total); G.T. Moore Medal
- B Section – J.Nelson 1959 & 1961 (1 Medallist/2 Medals); L.S. Zachariah Medal
- C Grade – L.Boyd-Gerny 1938; J.Nelson 1960; R.Skinner 1994; M.White 2004 (4 total)
- Division 2 – Tim Harper 2015

== Notable players ==
- Keith Truscott
- Neil Roberts
- Ken Albiston

== Seasons ==
Premiers	Grand Finalist	Minor premiers	Finals appearance	Wooden spoon	Division leading goalkicker	Division best and fairest

=== Seniors ===
Year	League	Division	Finish	W	L	D	Coach	Captain	Best and fairest	Leading goalkicker		Ref
1929	MAFA	C Section	9th	3	15	0						
2011	VAFA	Premier C	10th	4	14	0	Paul Dodd	Lachlan D Evans	Heath J Taylor	Matt White	22	
2012	VAFA	Division 1	5th	9	9	0	Paul Dodd	Lachlan D Evans	Steve Villani	Nicholas Hawking	21	
2013	VAFA	Division 1	9th	5	13	0	Luke Egan	Kane C Smith	Dylan Hamilton-Ho	Benjamin Smith	16	
2014	VAFA	Division 1	10th	1	17	0	Luke Egan	Kane C Smith	Steve Villani	Anthony Svirskis	21	
2015	VAFA	Division 2	6th	9	9	0	Matt Nicholas	Anthony Svirskis, Timothy Harper	Steve Villani	Nicholas Hawking	56	
2016	VAFA	Division 2	5th	8	8	0	Matt Nicholas	Anthony Svirskis, Timothy Harper	Dylan Hamilton-Ho	Kane C Smith	44	
2017	VAFA	Division 2	3rd	11	7	0	Matt Nicholas	Beau Jellis, Michael Brain	James Tran	Kane C Smith	42	
2018	VAFA	Division 2	5th	9	9	0	Matt Nicholas	Kane C Smith, Mitchell Wilson	Bradley Jordan	Kane C Smith	68	
2019	VAFA	Division 2	4th	8	8	0	Matt Nicholas	Kane C Smith, Mitchell Wilson	Timothy Campelj	Ashan Wijayakumara	30	
2021	VAFA	Division 2	2nd	10	1	0	Bernard Pretty	Mitchell Wilson, Timothy Campelj	Will Hellier	Ashan Wijayakumara	42	
2022	VAFA	Division 2	5th	11	6	1	Bernard Pretty	Mitchell Wilson, Sean Lester	Julian Eimutis	Ashan Wijayakumara	35	
2023	VAFA	Division 2	6th	7	10	1	Bernard Pretty	Julian Eimutis	Julian Eimutis	Mathew Pereira	41	
2024	VAFA	Division 2	6th	7	10	1	Bernard Pretty	Sean Lester	Nick McKinnon	Mathew Pereira	38	
2025	VAFA	Division 2	5th	9	9	0	Bernard Pretty	Sean Lester	Alastair Clarke	Mathew Pereira	46	
2026	VAFA	Division 2	3rd	13	5	0	Sean Lester	Will Cardwell		Luca Di Lallo	72	
