= University Oval, Melbourne =

Sports venue in Parkville, Melbourne, Victoria

University Oval
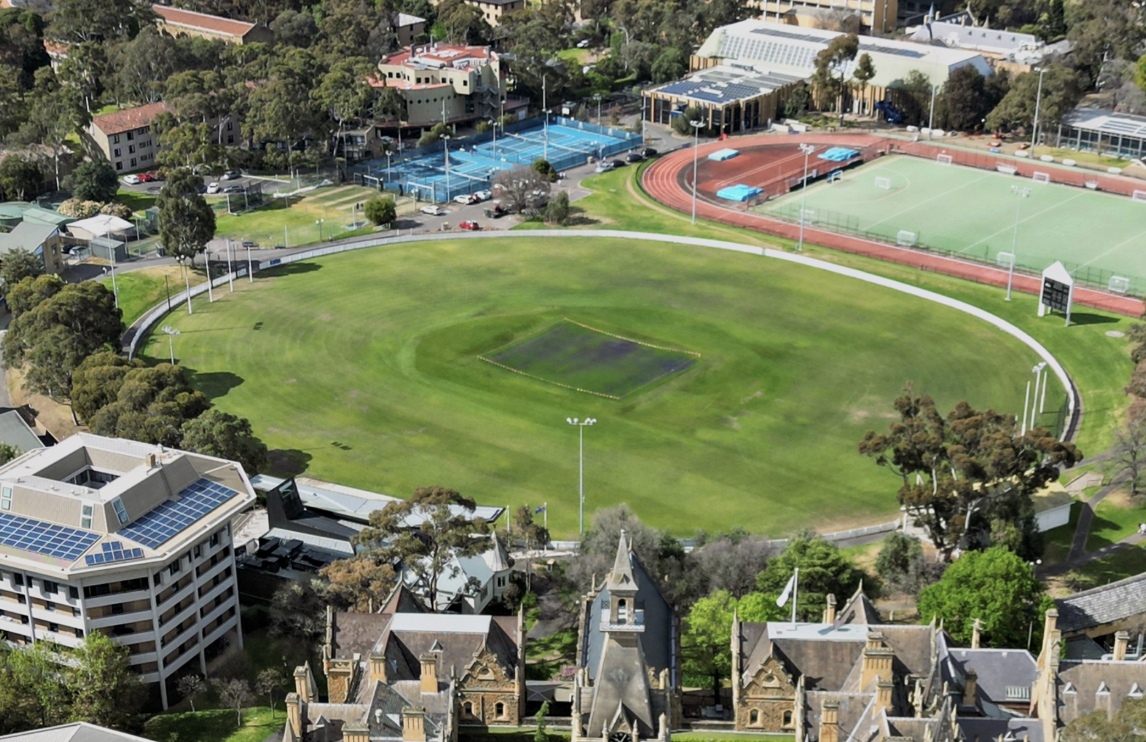
- Interactive map of University Oval
- Location: Parkville, Victoria
- Coordinates: 37.79436098286525°S 144.9616213049002°E
- Owner: University of Melbourne
- Capacity: 1,000
- Record attendance: 5,000 (University vs South Melbourne, 8 August 1885)
- Public transit: ■ Morrah Street; Trinity College/Royal Pde

Construction
- Opened: 1853; 173 years ago

Tenants
- University Blacks (VAFA); University Blues (VAFA); University Mugars (VAFAW); University Cricket Club (VPC)

University Oval (also known as the University Cricket Ground, Melbourne University Oval or Main Oval) is an Australian rules football and cricket venue located in the Melbourne suburb of Parkville. The ground is located within the main campus of the University of Melbourne.

As of 2026, the ground is home to the Melbourne University Football Club in the Victorian Amateur Football Association (VAFA) and the Melbourne University Cricket Club in the Victorian Premier Cricket competition.

== History ==
The University of Melbourne was established in 1853, with a cricket club formed in 1856 and a football club formed in 1859. In 1885, the University Football Club joined the Victorian Football Association (VFA), playing its home matches at the ground. The club went into recess at the end of the 1888 season.

Between 1894 and 1896, the Carlton Football Club played its home matches at Royal Park and University Oval until moving permanently to Princes Park for the inaugural Victorian Football League (VFL) season in 1897. The University Football Club briefly competed in the VFL from 1908 until the end of 1914, but instead played at the East Melbourne Cricket Ground and the Melbourne Cricket Ground.

After dropping out of the VFL, the club joined the Victorian Junior Football League (VJFL) with two teams – University A (University Blues) and University B (University Blacks) – that both played at University Oval. By 1921, both teams had entered the Metropolitan Amateur Football Association (MAFA), which was later renamed to the Victorian Amateur Football Association (VAFA), and continued playing home matches at the ground.

University Oval was again used for state-level football in 2016 and 2017, when the Melbourne University Mugars competed in the VFL Women's (VFLW).
