= Southbank Football Club =

Names
- Full name: Southbank Amateur Football Club
- Former name(s): State Commonwealth Bank Football Club (1990−1992); Commonwealth Bank Football Club (1992−1994); Southbank CBA Amateur Football Club (1994−1997)
- Nickname(s): Bankers; The Bank; Cobras

1998 D Section season
- After finals: 2nd
- Home-and-away season: 2nd
- Best and fairest: K. Walford

Club details
- Founded: Late 1990
- Dissolved: Late 1998; 27 years ago
- Competition: Victorian Amateur Football Association
- Ground(s): Swan St, Southbank

Uniforms
Home

The Southbank Football Club, nicknamed the Bankers, was an Australian rules football club based in the Melbourne suburb of Southbank that competed in the Victorian Amateur Football Association (VAFA).

The club was formed in 1990 as State Commonwealth Bank following a merger of State Bank and Commonwealth Bank, before changing its name to Southbank in 1994.

In late 1998, the club merged with Prahran Football Club, although the name "Southbank Amateur Football Club" remains registered with the VAFA. Southbank's jumper has also been worn as Prahran's clash jumper since 2023.

== History ==
=== State Bank ===
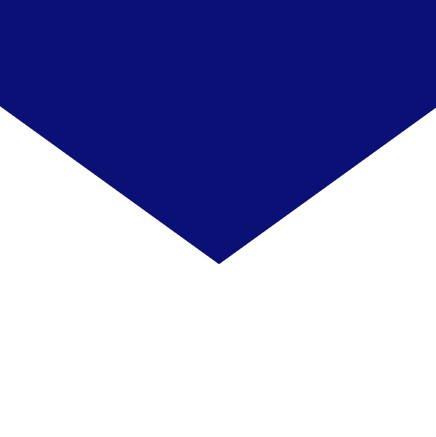
Colours of State Bank

The State Bank Football Club was formed in 1920 as the State Savings Bank of Victoria Football Club (SSB). The club was sponsored by the State Savings Bank of Victoria, and wore a maroon uniform during its years in the VBFA. Upon joining the MAFA, black with a yellow monogram and trim was adopted. Its home games were played at Brighton Beach Oval.

The club joined the joined the Victorian Banks Football Association (VBFA) in its first season in 1920, and was "overwhelming superior" in the competition, dominating for many years as its most popular club.

State Savings Bank had players from both Melbourne and regional Victoria, and the club was a way of ensuring that bank employees who were transferred to Melbourne for employment purposes were not seduced by other "more disreputable" activities in their free time. The inclusion of players from regional areas also increased interest among the bank's rural branches, and it was not unusual for regional employees on annual leave to attend games in Melbourne.

Geelong Football Club player Jimmy Rodgers played for State Savings Bank in 1923.

==== VAFA ====
Prior to the start of the 1927 season, State Savings Bank left the VBFA to join the Metropolitan Amateur Football Association (MAFA, later known as the VAFA). Unlike other workplace clubs which played its games on weekdays, State Savings Bank played on Saturday afternoons, and the switch to the MAFA was seen as convenient and practical. The club also sought "a greater challenge and an appropriate social environment" in comparison to the VBFA.

State Savings Bank won the C Section premiership in its first MAFA season, and was promoted to B Section. The club continued to prosper throughout the 1930s, however a second C Section premiership did not come until 1961, and a third premiership came in E Section in 1972.

The club was one of several that opposed the VAFA executive's decision to curtail the 1940 season due to World War II, instead advocating for continuing the season until the government requested a cessation.

When the State Savings Bank of Victoria was renamed to State Bank in 1977, the club also changed its name.

In its final season in 1990, the club won the D Section premiership, defeating Whitefriars by 21 points.

=== Commonwealth Bank ===
The Commonwealth Bank Football Club, nicknamed the Cobras, was formed in 1919 and sponsored by the Commonwealth Bank. The club wore royal blue and gold colours.

The club joined the Victorian Banks Football Association (VBFA) in its first season in 1920. However, the VBFA was disbanded in 1931 and the club went into recess.

Victorian Football League (VFL) players Tom Fitzmaurice and Gordon McCracken played for Commonwealth Bank in a 1923 VBFA final.

==== VAFA ====
In 1946, Commonwealth Bank was reformed and joined the VAFA the following year in 1947. The club won the C Section premiership the same year, which was followed by a B Section premiership in 1950. However, the club would not win another grand final until its C Section premiership in 1969, which would turn out to be its final premiership.

In its final season in 1990, the club made the F Section grand final but was defeated by St Mary's.

=== Merger and new club ===
In late 1990, the State Bank of Victoria was sold to the Commonwealth Bank, and the respective clubs were forced to merge as a result. The merged club entered the VAFA as the State Commonwealth Bank Football Club (also stylised as State/Commonwealth Bank) for the 1991 season, officially nicknamed the "Cobras".

The club again changed its name in 1992, returning to simply "Commonwealth Bank".

Ahead of the 1994 season, the Commonwealth Bank ended its sponsorship and the club was renamed to Southbank Football Club (officially known as Southbank CBA Amateur Football Club).

Southbank won the E South Section premiership in 1997, going undefeated for the entire season. The reserves team also won the premiership, however they suffered a single defeat in the second semi-final.

=== Amalgamation with Prahran ===
At the end of the 1994 season, the Prahran Football Club left the Victorian Football Association (VFA) as part of the Victorian State Football League's efforts to reduce the size of the competition and align it with the TAC Cup. However, the club did not immediately join a new competition, and instead went into recess. Around six Prahran players joined Southbank for the 1995 VAFA season.

Following the 1998 VAFA season, in which Southbank lost the D Section grand final, the club merged with Prahran, who subsequently returned to the playing field for the 1999 VAFA season. Kew Football Club's Club XVIII side also merged with Southbank to serve as Prahran's new Club XVIII side.

The merger followed works beginning at Southbank's home ground to build John Cain Arena, while Prahran was no longer in debt and sought to return to playing again.

== Seasons ==
Premiers	Grand Finalist	Minor premiers	Finals appearance	Wooden spoon	Division leading goalkicker	Division best and fairest

=== Southbank ===
==== Seniors ====
Year	Division	Finish	W	L	D	Coach	Captain	President	Secretary	Best Clubman	Best and fairest
1991	C Section	5th	11	7	0	Craig Jackson	Craig Jackson				Ron Gniel
1992	C Section	4th	12	6	0	Craig Jackson	Craig Jackson				Neil Short
1993	C Section	10th	4	14	0	Craig Jackson	Neil Wallmeyer				Andre Pitts
1994						Ken Bremner	John McNamara	P. Sparrow	Tracey Matherson	Neil Roberts; Raelene Roberts	Anthony Corboy
1995						Derek Hine	Simon Melican	Ken Bremner	Tracey Matherson	Kevin Matherson; Tracey Matherson	John McNamara
1996	D Section	8th	9	9	0	Derek Hine	Simon Melican	Ken Bremner	Gerry McNamee	Ken Matherson	Craig Perry
1997	E South	1st	18	0	0	Derek Hine	Simon Melican	Ken Bremner	Gerry McNamee	Russell Lucas	Craig Perry
1998	D Section	2nd	14	3	1	Derek Hine	Andre Pitts	Ken Bremner	Tom Brain	Basil Cleary; Kevin Matherson	Kipp Walford
