= East Malvern Football Club =

East Malvern

Names
- Full name: East Malvern Football Club
- Nickname: Panthers

Club details
- Founded: 1964; 62 years ago
- Colours
- Competition: Southern Football Netball League
- Premierships: (5): 1978, 1985, 1990, 2001, 2012

Uniforms
Home

Other information
- Official website: eastmalvernfc.com

The East Malvern Football Club is an Australian rules football club located in the southern suburbs of Melbourne. The club participates in the Southern Football League, based in the south and south eastern suburbs of Melbourne, Victoria.

== History ==
The club was established in 1964 as a result of a merger of the Tooronga FC and the Malvern Amateurs FC. The Tooronga Football Club (est. 1919) & the Malvern Amateur Football club (est. 1934), held talks to form a club that took in the Tooronga and Malvern areas. The club was known as Tooronga Malvern Football Club.

The club took a while to have success as they won the 1978 SESFL B grade premiership. The SESFL was renamed the Southern Football League in 1992.

In 2011 the Tooronga Malvern Football Club changed its name to East Malvern Football Club. The rationale behind the change was that the club needed to align itself with the local community.

Premiership success also came in 2001 and 2012.

== Senior Premierships ==
- South East Suburban Football League (3): 1978, 1985, 1990
- Southern Football League (2): 2001, 2012
