= Murrumbeena Football Club =

Murrumbeena

Names
- Full name: Murrumbeena Football Netball Club
- Nickname: Lions or "The Beena"
- Club song: Carlton theme song

2024 season

Club details
- Founded: 1918; 108 years ago
- Colours
- Competition: Southern Football Netball League
- President: Jay Cotsis
- Coach: Michael Kinsella
- Captain: Sam Michael
- Premierships: (9): 1934, 1963, 1974, 1986, 1993, 2003, 2017(W), 2018 (W), 2024
- Ground: Murrumbeena Park Oval, Victoria

Uniforms
Home

Other information
- Official website: https://murrumbeenafnc.com.au/

The Murrumbeena Football Club is an Australian rules football club located in the southern suburbs of Melbourne. The club participates in the Southern Football Netball League, based in the south and south eastern suburbs of Melbourne, Victoria. Murrumbeena plays on the Murrumbeena Park Oval, their home ground located along Kangaroo Rd, Murrumbeena.

== History ==
The club was established in 1918. Founded as a junior club that only allowed players under 21 years of age, the club later dropped its age restrictions when the club joined the Sub-District Football League in 1928. In 1934 it moved to the Caulfield-Oakleigh-Dandenong Football League and promptly won the premiership against South Oakleigh.

Murrumbeena was often the bridesmaid as they regularly made the grand final but were unable to win it. The creation of a new league, the South East Suburban Football League saw the breakthrough when they won the premiership. A regular finals competitor the club won another flag in 1974.

By the mid-1980s the cost of paying players put a strain on the finances. Players left for greener pastures and the club slid down to Third Division. The club won a Third Division flag in 1986 and later again in the Southern League in 1993.

In 2003 the Senior club were premiers under playing coach Darren Kappler.

Murrumbeena Football Netball Club Women's team was a powerhouse of the SFNL being undefeated premiers in 2017 and 2018.

In 2024, Murrumbeena FNC men's football program won premierships across Seniors, Reserves, Opens and Under 19's being the only club in SFNL history to accomplish this. In season 2025 Murrumbeena will be the only club in SFNL history to have Women's football, Netball, Opens football, Under 19's and Senior men's football all competing in Division 1.

== Senior premierships ==
- Caulfield Oakleigh Dandenong Football League (1): 1934
- South East Suburban Football League (3): 1963, 1974, 1986
- Southern Football League
  - Division 2 Senior Men's (2):
  - 2024 Coach Michael Kinsella.Captain Jordan Pollard
  - 2003 Coach Darren Kappler. Captain Kristian Kolb
  - Division 3 Senior Men's (1): 1993
  - Division 1 Women's (2):
  - 2017 Coach Emerys Lloyd- Griffths Captain Grace Bibby
  - 2018 Coach Emerys Lloyd- Griffths Captain Lauren Luff
- Under 19’s Division 1

2013 Coach Ray Hargreaves Captain Darcy Hargrave

2024 Coach Dimitri Petrakis Captain Lachlan English

2026 Coach Peter Smith Captain Jai Smith & Harry Geri
