= Black Rock Football Club =

Australian football club

Black Rock
- Full name: Black Rock Football Club
- Nickname: Jets
- Founded: 1908
- League: Southern Football Netball League
- Home ground: William Street Reserve, Brighton, Victoria
- Colours: Black with Red Sash
- Website: http://www.blackrockfnc.com.au/

The Black Rock Football Club is an Australian rules football club located in the Melbourne bayside suburb of Black Rock. The club competed in 3rd division in the 2024 season.

== History ==
The club commenced official competition play in 1913 by joining the Federal Football League (FDL). Apart from a brief period during the late 1920s in Victorian Amateur Football Association, Black Rock remained in the FDL until the early 1970s.

The club folded in 1972, but was successfully revived and entered into the Eastern Suburbs Churches Football Association in 1976. Black Rock transferred to the South East Suburban Football League in 1986 before that league changed its name to the Southern Football League in 1992. The SFL then absorbed the ESCFA in 1993.

From 2008 to 2012 the club participated in Division 2 of the SFL after winning the 3rd division premiership in 2007.

At the end of the 2012 season, the Southern Football League stripped the club of their premiership points, invoking a by-law that requires all clubs to be 'financial'. Subsequently, the club was deemed to have finished last in Division 2 and was relegated to Division 3.

== Senior Premierships ==
- Federal Football League
  - 1935, 1936, 1954
- East Suburban Churches Football Association
  - 1980 (E Grade), 1984 (D Grade)
- Southern Football League
  - 2004, 2007, 2015, 2022 (all in Division 3)
