= Pascoe Vale Sports Club =

Pascoe Vale

Names
- Full name: Pascoe Vale Sports Club
- Nickname: Panthers

2025 season
- After finals: 8th
- Home-and-away season: 8th

Club details
- Founded: 1918; 108 years ago
- Colours: Red Black
- Competition: EDFL
- Premierships: VFL Sub-District League (1) 1946 EDFL Division 2 (1) 1964 EDFL Divison 1 (2) 1988, 2011
- Ground: Raeburn Reserve, Pascoe Vale

Uniforms
Home	Away

Other information
- Official website: pascoevalesc.org.au

The Pascoe Vale Sports Club is an Australian rules football club 11 km north-west of Melbourne in the suburb of Pascoe Vale. The club is affiliated with the Essendon District Football League.

== History ==
The club was founded in 1918 and moved to its current location at Raeburn Reserve in 1925.

The 1930s saw the club compete in the Victorian Football Association Sub District competition against clubs as West Melbourne Football Club North Melbourne Football Club, West Coburg Football Club, Footscray Football Club, Windsor, West Preston Football Club and were runners up in 1935.

During the latter part of the 1930s the club transferred to the Victorian Football League Sub District competition, and played against South Melbourne District, Richmond, District, East Brunswick, Kew, Fairfield, Sunshine Football Club. During this period the club was seen as Essendon Football Club thirds. Open age sides during the war were not fielded but the club's under 18s and under 21s were known as Sons of Soldiers.

The club won its first senior premiership in the League Sub District competition in 1946 and was runners up in 1947.

1952, the club changed its name to Raeburn Football Club to enable it to join the Essendon District Football League only to change back to Pascoe Vale in 1953.

1988 the club won their first B Grade Essendon District Football League premiership and had to wait until 2011 for their second B Grade premiership.

Pascoe Vale Football Club began fielding junior teams in 1956 with the formation of an under 15 team. The club now fields sixteen Under Age teams.

In 2016 the Pascoe Vale Sports Club was founded to take over the running of the Pascoe Vale Football Club and the Pascoe Vale Hadfield Cricket Club.

== Senior Premierships (4) ==
- Victorian Football League Sub Districts
  - 1946
- Essendon District FL B Grade
  - 1988, 2011
- Essendon District FL C Grade
  - 1964.
