= 2014 VAFA season =

114th season of the Victorian Amateur Football Association

- Date: 5 April – 20 September 2014
- Teams: 72
- Matches played: 678

The 2014 VAFA season was the 114th season of the Victorian Amateur Football Association (VAFA), the largest senior men's Australian rules football competition in Victoria. The season began on 5 April and concluded on 20 September, with 72 teams participating across seven divisions under a promotion and relegation system.

== Association membership ==
After a last-placed finish in Division 3 in 2013, the Old Westbourne Football Club split into two new clubs. The majority of the club formed the Wyndham Suns, changing Old Westbourne's name and competing in the under-19s competition without a senior team. A group of Old Westbourne players and officials formed a new club known as Westbourne, which entered Division 4.

Canterbury left the Eastern Football League (EFL) and entered the VAFA. Mt Lilydale withdrew from the VAFA senior competition as part of a club rebuild, entering Club XVIII for the 2014 season.

== Premier ==
2014 Premier Division season
- Date: 5 April – 20 September 2014
- Teams: 10
- Premiers: University Blacks; 14th Premier premiership
- Runners-up: Collegians; 14th Premier runners-up result
- Minor premiers: University Blacks
- Relegated: Old Brighton; St Bedes/Mentone Tigers
- JN Woodrow Medallist: Brendan Iezzi (Old Trinity – 28 votes)
- Matches played: 94

University Blacks won the Premier Division premiership for the 14th time and the first time since 1974, defeating Collegians by 44 points in the grand final.

During the season, Old Xaverians parted ways with senior coach Dom Berry.

=== Venues ===
Club	Home venue(s)	Capacity
Beaumaris	Banksia Reserve	
Collegians	Harry Trott Oval	
De La Salle	Waverley Oval	
Old Brighton	Brighton Beach Oval	6,000
Old Scotch	Camberwell Sports Ground	5,000
Old Trinity	Daley Oval	
Old Xaverians	Sportscover Arena	8,000
Old Xaverians	Toorak Park	5,000
St Bedes/Mentone Tigers	Brindisi Street Oval	
St Bernard's	St Bernard's College	
University Blacks	University Oval	1,000

=== Ladder ===
Pos	Team	Pld	W	L	D	PF	PA	PP	Pts	Qualification
1	University Blacks (P)	18	15	3	0	1842	1032	178.5	60	Finals series
2	St Bernard's	18	13	5	0	1603	1321	121.3	52	Finals series
3	Old Scotch	18	11	7	0	1625	1452	111.9	44	Finals series
4	Collegians	18	11	7	0	1535	1429	107.4	44	Finals series
5	Old Trinity	18	10	8	0	1408	1321	106.6	40	
6	Old Xaverians	18	10	8	0	1372	1347	101.9	40	
7	Beaumaris	18	7	11	0	1510	1625	92.9	28	
8	De La Salle	18	5	13	0	1150	1526	75.4	20	
9	Old Brighton	18	5	13	0	1158	1687	68.6	20	Relegation to Premier B
10	St Bedes/Mentone Tigers	18	3	15	0	1322	1785	74.1	12	Relegation to Premier B

Rules for classification: 1) points; 2) percentage; 3) number of points for.
(P) Premiers

=== Finals ===
==== Grand Final ====
2014 VAFA Premier Division Grand Final
Saturday, 20 September (2:30pm)	University Blacks	def.	Collegians	Sportscover Arena
2.3 (15); 2.4 (16); 12.9 (81); 13.12 (90)	Q1; Q2; Q3; Final	0.1 (1); 3.1 (19); 4.2 (26); 7.4 (46)
J. Blake 2, H. Lahy 2, A. Robbins 2, A. Pattison 1, T. Kruse 1, J. Laurie 1, H. Lacey 1, T. Napier 1, A. Locke 1, S. Weekley 1	Goals	S. Taft 3, N. Corp 2, J. Kamener 1, H. Croft 1
B. Mahon, H. Lahy, A. Pitt, S. Weekley, A. Pattison, S. Thomas	Best	C. Hylton, J. Eimutis, S. Hibbins, N. Ries, T. Penberthy, C. Holst

== Premier B ==
2014 Premier B season
- Date: 5 April – 14 September 2014
- Teams: 10
- Premiers: University Blues; 3rd Premier B premiership
- Runners-up: Old Carey; 1st Premier B runners-up result
- Minor premiers: University Blues
- Promoted: University Blues; Old Carey
- Relegated: Old Haileybury; Old Ivanhoe
- GT Moore Medallist: Tom Paule (Old Melburnians)
- Matches played: 94

University Blues won the Premier B premiership for the third time, defeating Old Carey by 75 points in the grand final. Both clubs were promoted to Premier Division for the 2015 season.

=== Venues ===
Club	Home venue(s)	Capacity
AJAX	Gary Smorgon Oval	
Caulfield Grammarians	Glen Huntly Oval	
Fitzroy	Brunswick Street Oval	10,000
Mazenod	Central Reserve	6,000
Old Carey	Gramlick Oval	
Old Haileybury	Princes Park	
Old Ivanhoe	Chelsworth Park	
Old Melburnians	Junction Oval	8,000
St Kevin's	TH King Oval	
University Blues	University Oval	

=== Ladder ===
Pos	Team	Pld	W	L	D	PF	PA	PP	Pts	Qualification
1	University Blues (P)	18	15	3	0	2031	924	219.8	60	Finals series
2	St Kevin's	18	11	7	0	1842	1561	118.0	44	Finals series
3	Old Carey	18	11	7	0	1757	1496	117.4	44	Finals series
4	Old Melburnians	18	11	7	0	1524	1302	117.1	44	Finals series
5	AJAX	18	10	8	0	1419	1449	97.9	40	
6	Mazenod	18	8	10	0	1474	1541	95.7	32	
7	Caulfield Grammarians	18	7	11	0	1160	1700	68.2	28	
8	Fitzroy	18	6	11	1	1239	1600	77.4	26	
9	Old Haileybury	18	5	12	1	1402	1788	78.4	22	Relegation to Premier C
10	Old Ivanhoe	18	5	13	0	1231	1718	71.7	20	Relegation to Premier C

Rules for classification: 1) points; 2) percentage; 3) number of points for.
(P) Premiers

=== Finals ===
==== Grand Final ====
2014 VAFA Premier B Grand Final
Sunday, 14 September (2:30pm)	University Blues	def.	Old Carey	Sportscover Arena
5.7 (37); 7.7 (49); 12.14 (86); 20.22 (142)	Q1; Q2; Q3; Final	3.1 (19); 5.5 (35); 8.6 (54); 10.7 (67)
T. MacKenzie 6, P. Gardiner 2, P. Summers 2, R. Eade 2, J. Caldow, R. McMahon, J. Mugavin, W. Cuningham, M. Rippon, M. James, S. Carr, D. Heinz	Goals	B. Smithwick 3, M. Laidlaw 2, C. Howat 2, J. Reid, L. Macleod, N. Richardson
J. Mugavin, T. MacKenzie, J. Townley, P. Summers, A. Nice, C. Williams	Best	L. McQueen-Miscamble, A. Stewart-Holmes, J. Rice, B. Smithwick, T. Roach, C. Howat

== Premier C ==
2014 Premier C season
- Date: 5 April – 13 September 2014
- Teams: 10
- Premiers: Hampton Rovers; 4th Premier C premiership
- Runners-up: Parkdale Vultures; 1st Premier C runners-up result
- Minor premiers: Marcellin
- Promoted: Hampton Rovers; Parkdale Vultures
- Relegated: Ormond (Note: Although Banyule would have been relegated to Division 1 in 2015, it left the VAFA following the 2014 season, joining the Northern Football League (NFL).)
- Matches played: 94

Hampton Rovers won the Premier C premiership for the fourth time, defeating Old Carey by 75 points in the grand final. Both clubs were promoted to Premier B for the 2015 season.

=== Venues ===
Club	Home venue(s)	Capacity
Banyule	R.J. Brockwell Oval	
Hampton Rovers	Boss James Reserve	4,000
Marcellin	Marcellin College	
Monash Blues	Frearson Oval	
Oakleigh	Scammell Reserve	
Old Camberwell	Gordon Barnard Reserve	
Ormond	E.E. Gunn Reserve	
Parkdale Vultures	Gerry Green Reserve	
PEGS	PEGS Sporting Fields	
Peninsula Old Boys	Peninsula School	

=== Ladder ===
Pos	Team	Pld	W	L	D	PF	PA	PP	Pts	Qualification
1	Marcellin	18	15	3	0	1705	1216	140.2	60	Finals series
2	Hampton Rovers (P)	18	14	4	0	1764	1318	133.8	56	Finals series
3	Monash Blues	18	13	5	0	1580	1065	148.4	52	Finals series
4	Parkdale Vultures	18	10	8	0	1601	1381	115.9	40	Finals series
5	PEGS	18	9	9	0	1472	1538	95.7	36	
6	Oakleigh	18	8	10	0	1513	1413	107.1	32	
7	Peninsula Old Boys	18	8	10	0	1425	1638	87.0	32	
8	Old Camberwell	18	7	10	1	1527	1643	92.9	30	
9	Banyule	18	3	15	0	1383	2147	64.4	12	Withdrew after end of season
10	Ormond	18	2	15	1	1256	1867	67.3	10	Relegation to Division 1

Rules for classification: 1) points; 2) percentage; 3) number of points for.
(P) Premiers

=== Finals ===
==== Grand Final ====
2014 VAFA Premier C Grand Final
Saturday, 13 September (2:30pm)	Hampton Rovers	def.	Parkdale Vultures	Trevor Barker Beach Oval
5.4 (34); 10.6 (66); 11.7 (73); 14.7 (91)	Q1; Q2; Q3; Final	2.3 (15); 4.4 (28); 8.8 (56); 9.10 (64)
G. Martyn 6, E. Turner 2, J. Ting 2, C. Sharp, J. Verlin, J. Toouli, M. Care	Goals	C. Dillon 5, K. Lopo 3, N. Ng
J. Lovig, G. Martyn, J. Ting, R. Atkins, D. Corp, L. Fletcher	Best	M. Kidner, K. Lopo, C. Dillon, R. Swayn, N. Ng, S. Chapman

== Division 1 ==
2014 Division 1 season
- Date: 5 April – 14 September 2014
- Teams: 10
- Premiers: Williamstown CYMS; 1st Division 1 premiership
- Runners-up: Therry Penola; 1st Division 1 runners-up result
- Minor premiers: Therry Penola
- Promoted: Williamstown CYMS; Therry Penola
- Relegated: Bulleen Templestowe; MHSOB
- Matches played: 94

Williamstown CYMS won the Division 1 premiership for the first time, defeating Old Carey by 75 points in the grand final. Both clubs were promoted to Premier C for the 2015 season.

=== Ladder ===
Pos	Team	Pld	W	L	D	PF	PA	PP	Pts	Qualification
1	Therry Penola	18	18	0	0	2180	1027	212.3	72	Finals series
2	Williamstown CYMS (P)	18	14	4	0	1676	1240	135.2	56	Finals series
3	NOBs/St Pat's	18	12	6	0	1767	1491	118.5	48	Finals series
4	Old Geelong	18	11	7	0	1659	1468	113.0	44	Finals series
5	Old Mentonians	18	9	9	0	1619	1695	95.5	36	
6	Prahran Assumption	18	8	10	0	1698	1522	111.6	32	
7	Yarra Old Grammarians	18	7	10	1	1432	1768	81.0	30	
8	Whitefriars	18	5	13	0	1277	1664	76.7	20	
9	Bulleen Templestowe	18	4	13	1	1266	1665	76.0	18	Relegation to Division 2
10	MHSOB	18	1	17	0	1137	2171	52.4	4	Relegation to Division 2

Rules for classification: 1) points; 2) percentage; 3) number of points for.
(P) Premiers

=== Finals ===
==== Grand Final ====
2014 VAFA Division 1 Grand Final
Sunday, 14 September (2:30pm)	Williamstown CYMS	def.	Therry Penola	Visy Park
6.1 (37); 7.7 (49); 13.13 (91); 16.14 (110)	Q1; Q2; Q3; Final	1.1 (7); 2.4 (16); 4.5 (29); 8.6 (54)
M. John 6, S. Puhar 3, J. Gray 2, A. Heaver, C. Richards, R. Joy, L. Molan, R. Chan	Goals	J. Bannister 3, C. Bannister 3, M. Costello, M. Pell
M. John, B. Gray, R. Danaher, T. Johnstone, T. Murphy, D. Calman-Orr	Best	J. Egglestone, P. Edwards, M. Marangon, B. Egglestone, B. Harding, M. Lyons

== Division 2 ==
2014 Division 2 season
- Date: 5 April – 13 September 2014
- Teams: 10
- Premiers: Kew; 1st Division 2 premiership
- Runners-up: St Mary's Salesian; 1st Division 2 runners-up result
- Minor premiers: Kew
- Promoted: Kew; St Mary's Salesian
- Relegated: Monash Gryphons; Glen Eira
- Matches played: 94

Kew won the Division 2 premiership for the first time, defeating St Mary's Salesian by 11 points in the grand final. Both clubs were promoted to Division 1 for the 2015 season.

=== Ladder ===
Pos	Team	Pld	W	L	D	PF	PA	PP	Pts	Qualification
1	Kew	18	15	2	1	1809	1084	166.9	62	Finals series
2	St Mary's Salesian (P)	18	15	3	0	2088	1005	207.8	60	Finals series
3	Albert Park	18	13	5	0	1778	1219	145.9	52	Finals series
4	Old Paradians	18	11	7	0	1593	1214	131.2	44	Finals series
5	Ivanhoe	18	10	7	1	1643	1337	122.9	42	
6	St John's	18	10	8	0	1705	1393	122.4	40	
7	South Melbourne Districts	18	6	12	0	1299	1803	72.0	24	
8	Elsternwick	18	4	14	0	1252	2086	60.0	16	
9	Monash Gryphons	18	3	15	0	1032	1948	53.0	12	Relegation to Division 3
10	Glen Eira	18	2	16	0	888	1998	44.4	8	Relegation to Division 3

Rules for classification: 1) points; 2) percentage; 3) number of points for.
(P) Premiers

=== Finals ===
==== Grand Final ====
2014 VAFA Division 2 Grand Final
Saturday, 13 September (2:30pm)	St Mary's Salesian	def. by	Kew	Casey Fields
0.3 (3); 3.7 (25); 5.10 (40); 6.11 (47)	Q1; Q2; Q3; Final	6.5 (41); 7.7 (49); 7.7 (49); 8.10 (58)
L. Holmes 2, H. Chipperfield, B. McLean, S. Jones, D. Weetra	Goals	S. Bishop 2, A. Brazzale 2, R. Maibaum 2, K. Margaritis, J. Guerin
H. Chipperfield, C. Butler, S. Jones, N. Latsas, D. Weetra, B. McLean	Best	M. Waters, J. Delbridge, S. Bishop, T. Leeds, M. Henderson, K. Margaritis

== Division 3 ==
2014 Division 3 season
- Date: 5 April – 13 September 2014
- Teams: 12
- Premiers: Northern Blues; 1st Division 3 premiership
- Runners-up: Richmond Central; 1st Division 3 runners-up result
- Minor premiers: Northern Blues; 1st Division 3 minor premiership
- Promoted: Northern Blues; Richmond Central
- Relegated: La Trobe University; South Mornington
- Matches played: 114

The Northern Blues won the Division 3 premiership for the first time, defeating Richmond Central by 24 points in the grand final. Both clubs were promoted to Division 2 for the 2015 season.

=== Ladder ===
Pos	Team	Pld	W	L	D	PF	PA	PP	Pts	Qualification
1	Northern Blues (P)	18	14	4	0	2096	1343	156.1	56	Finals series
2	Wattle Park	18	13	5	0	2089	1118	186.9	52	Finals series
3	Aquinas	18	12	6	0	1769	1255	141.0	48	Finals series
4	Swinburne University	18	12	6	0	1632	1198	136.2	48	Finals series
5	Richmond Central	18	11	7	0	1846	1349	136.8	44	Finals series
6	Albert Park	18	9	9	0	1557	1363	114.2	36	Finals series
7	Power House	18	9	9	0	1325	1305	101.5	36	
8	UHS-VU	18	8	9	1	1362	1476	92.3	34	
9	St Francis Xavier	18	8	10	0	1315	1478	89.0	32	
10	Eley Park	18	6	12	0	1376	1560	88.2	24	
11	La Trobe University	18	5	12	1	1243	1379	90.1	22	Relegation to Division 4
12	South Mornington	18	0	18	0	461	3247	14.2	0	Relegation to Division 4

Rules for classification: 1) points; 2) percentage; 3) number of points for.
(P) Premiers

=== Finals ===
==== Grand Final ====
2014 VAFA Division 3 Grand Final
Saturday, 13 September (2:30pm)	Northern Blues	def.	Richmond Central	Garvey Oval
3.7 (25); 7.10 (52); 11.16 (82); 14.18 (102)	Q1; Q2; Q3; Final	3.4 (22); 7.5 (47); 9.6 (60); 12.6 (78)
T. Vuwai 3, L. McRedmond 3, D. Marcon 2, T. Beames, J. King, J. Phelan, S. Maatouk, N. Parkes, A. Campbell	Goals	L. Carland 3, A. Fiske 2, S. Demeo, W. Bucci, S. Bugeja, D. Roy, C. Pullen, R. Costanzo, P. Holland
D. Calcedo, T. Vuwai, J. King, O. Clark, P. Sansonetti, D. Marcon	Best	S. Brown, T. Thurwood, L. Carland, K. Schoenmaekers, T. Baker, N. Anstey

== Division 4 ==
2014 Division 4 season
- Date: 5 April – 13 September 2014
- Teams: 10
- Premiers: West Brunswick; 2nd Division 4 premiership
- Runners-up: Hawthorn; 2nd Division 4 runners-up result
- Minor premiers: Hawthorn
- Promoted: West Brunswick; Hawthorn
- Matches played: 94

West Brunswick won the Division 4 premiership for the second time, defeating Hawthorn by 38 points in the grand final. Both clubs were promoted to Division 3 for the 2015 season.

=== Ladder ===
Pos	Team	Pld	W	L	D	PF	PA	PP	Pts	Qualification
1	Hawthorn	18	18	0	0	2480	874	283.8	72	Finals series
2	West Brunswick (P)	18	16	2	0	2089	1115	187.4	64	Finals series
3	Canterbury	18	12	6	0	1834	1590	115.3	48	Finals series
4	Manningham Cobras	18	10	8	0	1600	1329	120.4	40	Finals series
5	Westbourne	18	10	8	0	1820	1525	119.3	40	
6	Box Hill North	18	7	11	0	1679	1821	92.2	28	
7	Point Cook	18	7	11	0	1379	1553	88.8	28	
8	Dragons	18	6	12	0	1165	1747	66.7	24	
9	North Brunswick	18	4	14	0	1449	1629	89.0	16	
10	Chadstone	18	0	18	0	701	3013	23.3	0	

Rules for classification: 1) points; 2) percentage; 3) number of points for.
(P) Premiers

=== Finals ===
==== Grand Final ====
2014 VAFA Division 4 Grand Final
Saturday, 13 September (2:30pm)	Hawthorn	def. by	West Brunswick	Meade Reserve
6.3 (39); 8.5 (53); 10.9 (69); 12.11 (83)	Q1; Q2; Q3; Final	2.3 (15); 11.4 (70); 13.10 (88); 18.13 (121)
R. White 3, S. Stormonth 3, J. Ince 2, D. Tremewen 2, S. Gunn, G. Edmond	Goals	D. Muscat 5, J. Nulty 3, N. Mitchell 2, M. Handscombe 2, Z. Tisdale, M. Holmes, P. Carroll, R. Benjamin, M. Simpson, A. Gibson
R. White, P. Avery, S. Gunn, N. Raiti, K. Pargeter, L. Chapman	Best	Z. Tisdale, J. Taylor, D. Muscat, L. Buckler, R. Touzel, M. Simpson
