= Merrington (surname) =

Merrington is the surname of the following people

- Andrew Merrington (born 1978), Australian rules footballer, son of Gary
- Dave Merrington (born 1945), English association football commentator, player and coach
- Gary Merrington (1946–2024), Australian rules footballer, father of Andrew
- Marguerite Merington (1857–1951), American author

== See also ==
- Merrington (disambiguation)
