= 2015 VAFA season =

115th season of the Victorian Amateur Football Association

- Date: 11 April − 20 September 2015
- Teams: 70
- Matches played: 658

The 2015 VAFA season was the 115th season of the Victorian Amateur Football Association (VAFA), the largest senior community Australian rules football competition in Victoria. The season began on 11 April and concluded on 20 September, with 70 teams participating across seven divisions under a promotion and relegation system.

== Association membership ==
The Parkside Football Club returned to the VAFA after 12 years in the Northern Football League (NFL). Parkside had previously competed in the VAFA between 1938 and 2002, winning twelve senior premierships during that time.

After two seasons in the Club XVIII competition, Masala became a senior club, entering a senior and reserves side in Division 4. Mt Lilydale, which had withdrawn from the VAFA senior competition at the end of the 2013 season as part of a club rebuild, returned to Division 4 after a year in Club XVIII.

On 5 August 2014, Banyule Football Club members voted to leave the VAFA at the end of the 2014 season and join the NFL, citing the loss of its players to competitions that allow player payments. The move was accepted after a vote of NFL clubs on 17 September 2014 and officially approved by AFL Victoria on 7 October 2014.

The Wyndham Suns announced in October 2014 that it would leave the VAFA to join the Western Region Football League (WRFL), where its junior teams were already competing. The Suns had been competing in the Under-19s North Section and did not have a senior VAFA team.

== Notable events ==
- In round 18, University Blacks held a "Gay? That's OK!" match against Collegians in support of Blacks player Lachlan Beaton, who had come out as gay in a YouTube video. It was the first time that such a campaign had been held in the VAFA, and Blacks players wore jumpers featuring rainbow stripes to support the cause.

== Premier ==
2015 VAFA Premier season
- Date: 11 April − 20 September 2015
- Teams: 10
- Premiers: St Bernard's; 3rd Premier premiership
- Minor premiers: St Bernard's
- JN Woodrow Medal: Adam Bentick (St Bernard's − 19 votes); Ross Young (University Blues − 19 votes)
- Leading goalkicker: Matthew Handley (Old Xaverians − 54 goals)
- Matches played: 94

St Bernard's won the Premier Division premiership for the third time, defeating Old Trinity by eight points in the grand final.

Old Scotch and Beaumaris were relegated to Premier B for the 2016 season. It was the first time since 1980 that Old Scotch had dropped down from A Section/Premier Division.

=== Ladder ===
Pos	Team	Pld	W	L	D	PF	PA	PP	Pts	Qualification
1	St Bernard's (P)	18	15	3	0	1798	1339	134.3	60	Finals series
2	Old Trinity	18	14	4	0	1616	1176	137.4	56	Finals series
3	University Blues	18	11	7	0	1599	1315	121.6	44	Finals series
4	De La Salle	18	9	8	1	1575	1414	109.3	38	Finals series
5	University Blacks	18	8	10	0	1467	1466	100.1	32	
6	Old Xaverians	18	8	10	0	1414	1496	96.3	32	
7	Old Carey	18	7	9	2	1490	1597	93.3	32	
8	Collegians	18	8	10	0	1368	1523	89.82	32	
9	Old Scotch	18	6	12	0	1395	1563	89.3	24	Relegation
10	Beaumaris	18	2	15	1	1077	1910	56.4	10	Relegation

Rules for classification: 1) points; 2) percentage; 3) number of points for.
(P) Premiers

=== Finals ===
2015 VAFA Premier Division Grand Final
Sunday, 20 September (2:20pm)	Old Trinity	def. by	St Bernard's	Ikon Park
2.3 (15); 6.7 (43); 13.9 (87); 15.15 (105)	Q1; Q2; Q3; Final	3.4 (22); 9.5 (59); 12.9 (81); 17.11 (113)	Jock Nelson Medal: Mitch Hannan (St Bernard's)
S. Nicolosi 5, E. Weatherson 3, A. Polidoros 2, J. Hunt 2, A. Kyriacopoulos, J. Steinhart, J. Osborn	Goals	A. Boyse 4, C. Jones 3, B. Ronke 2, A. McLeod 2, N. Kazuro, T. Cartledge, T. Sullivan, S. Clarke, T. Gleeson, M. Hannan
A. Kyriacopoulos, G. Hamilton, C. Pohl, J. Osborn, S. Nicolosi, N. Hunt	Best	M. Hannan, A. Boyse, A. Singleton, C. Jones, M. DeLeur, B. Ronke
The grand final was held at Ikon Park, making it the first time in 50 years that the A Section/Premier Division grand final had not been held at Elsternwick Park.

== Premier B ==
2015 VAFA Premier B season
- Date: 11 April − 19 September 2015
- Teams: 10
- Premiers: St Kevin's; 2nd Premier B premiership
- Minor premiers: St Kevin's
- GT Moore Medal: Rory Angiolella (Fitzroy − 26 votes)
- Leading goalkicker: Jake Lew (AJAX − 69 goals)
- Matches played: 94

=== Ladder ===
Pos	Team	Pld	W	L	D	PF	PA	PP	Pts	Qualification
1	St Kevin's (P)	18	18	0	0	2349	995	236.1	72	Finals series
2	St Bedes/Mentone Tigers	18	14	4	0	1943	1311	148.2	56	Finals series
3	Old Melburnians	18	12	6	0	1549	1324	117.0	48	Finals series
4	Old Brighton	18	10	8	0	1623	1344	120.8	40	Finals series
5	AJAX	18	10	8	0	1427	1454	98.1	40	
6	Fitzroy	18	8	10	0	1531	1422	107.7	32	
7	Hampton Rovers	18	6	12	0	1503	1897	79.2	24	
8	Parkdale Vultures	18	5	13	0	1227	1766	69.5	20	
9	Mazenod	18	5	13	0	1250	1870	66.8	20	Relegation
10	Caulfield Grammarians	18	2	16	0	1103	2122	52.0	8	Relegation

Rules for classification: 1) points; 2) percentage; 3) number of points for.
(P) Premiers

=== Finals ===
2015 VAFA Premier B Grand Final
Saturday, 19 September (2:20pm)	St Kevin's	def.	Old Melburnians	Elsternwick Park
3.1 (19); 5.5 (35); 10.12 (72); 13.18 (96)	Q1; Q2; Q3; Final	4.3 (27); 11.4 (70); 12.5 (77); 13.7 (85)
S. Gilham 3, S. Salopek, B. McCann, J. Gysberts, K. Williams, P. Edgar, G. Gleeson, Z. Ginies, D. Jones, H. Parkes, K. Wissell	Goals	S. Watson 3, A. Armstrong 2, N. De Steiger 2, C. Beck 2, T. Rosenthal, T. Paule, E. De Fegely, N. Daish
S. Gilham, N. Wood, N. Meehan, B. McCann, D. Jones, A. Lynch	Best	W. Thompson, L. Borthwick, G. Hurley-Wellington, S. Watson, E. De Fegely, N. Daish

== Premier C ==
2015 VAFA Premier C season
- Date: 11 April − 19 September 2015
- Teams: 10
- Premiers: Old Haileybury; 3rd Premier C premiership
- Minor premiers: Marcellin
- L Zachariah Medal: Carl Groth (Old Ivanhoe − 19 votes)
- Leading goalkicker: Aaron Cloke (Oakleigh − 77 goals)
- Matches played: 94

=== Ladder ===
Pos	Team	Pld	W	L	D	PF	PA	PP	Pts	Qualification
1	Marcellin	18	15	3	0	2122	1108	191.5	60	Finals series
2	Monash Blues	18	15	3	0	1670	902	185.1	60	Finals series
3	Old Ivanhoe	18	13	5	0	1554	1376	112.9	52	Finals series
4	Old Haileybury (P)	18	11	7	0	1414	1466	96.5	44	Finals series
5	Peninsula Old Boys	18	10	8	0	1614	1167	138.3	40	
6	Oakleigh	18	8	10	0	1708	1800	94.9	32	
7	Williamstown CYMS	18	7	11	0	1613	1887	85.5	28	
8	Old Camberwell	18	5	13	0	1232	1729	71.3	20	
9	Therry Penola	18	4	14	0	1131	1965	57.6	16	Relegation
10	PEGS	18	2	16	0	1198	1856	64.6	8	Relegation

Rules for classification: 1) points; 2) percentage; 3) number of points for.
(P) Premiers

=== Finals ===
2015 VAFA Premier C Grand Final
Saturday, 19 September (2:20pm)	Monash Blues	def. by	Old Haileybury	Trevor Barker Oval
1.2 (8); 5.9 (39); 6.11 (47); 6.12 (48)	Q1; Q2; Q3; Final	2.4 (16); 6.7 (43); 8.12 (60); 13.18 (96)	Best on ground: Peter Gleadhill
J. Griffiths 3, M. Hardiman, Z. Ledin, N. Petering	Goals	J. Nicolopoulos 4, N. Waite 2, J. Dawson 2, E. Limon 2, C. Connelly, T. Faulkner, J. Paul
A. Young, J. Griffiths, T. Cameron, C. Cosgriff, M. Davidson, C. Rossetti	Best	J. Donnelly, A. Weekes, H. McLauchlan, J. Dawson, P. Gleadhill, J. Toy

== Division 1 ==
2015 VAFA Division 1 season
- Date: 11 April − 12 September 2015
- Teams: 10
- Premiers: Kew; 1st Division 1 premiership
- Minor premiers: Ormond
- LS Pepper Medal: Sidney Jones (St Mary's Salesian − 19 votes)
- Leading goalkicker: Andrew Brazzale (Kew − 68 goals)
- Matches played: 94

=== Ladder ===
Pos	Team	Pld	W	L	D	PF	PA	PP	Pts	Qualification
1	Ormond	18	17	1	0	1959	1167	167.9	68	Finals series
2	Kew (P)	18	14	4	0	1894	1123	168.7	56	Finals series
3	Old Geelong	18	13	5	0	2029	1335	152.0	52	Finals series
4	St Mary's Salesian	18	12	6	0	1789	1697	105.4	48	Finals series
5	Whitefriars	18	8	10	0	1629	1641	99.3	32	
6	Prahran Assumption	18	7	11	0	1638	1543	106.2	28	
7	Old Mentonians	18	7	11	0	1529	1889	80.9	28	
8	NOBs/St Pat's	18	6	12	0	1385	1933	71.7	24	
9	Bulleen Templestowe	18	4	14	0	1291	1842	70.1	16	Relegation
10	Yarra Valley Old Boys	18	2	16	0	1264	2237	56.5	8	Relegation

Rules for classification: 1) points; 2) percentage; 3) number of points for.
(P) Premiers

=== Finals ===
2015 VAFA Division 1 Grand Final
Saturday, 12 September (2:15pm)	Kew	def. by	Ormond	Coburg City Oval
1.0 (6); 7.2 (44); 9.5 (59); 13.9 (87)	Q1; Q2; Q3; Final	1.5 (11); 1.6 (12); 7.7 (49); 8.9 (57)	JW Manton Medal: Kyle Margaritis (Kew)
A. Brazzale 2, B. Droessler 2, L. Kinsella, J. Fultheim, T. Orchard, D. Spencer, M. Henderson, S. Bishop , P. Couvalias, Z. Jones, T. Allman	Goals	J. Simon 2, M. Michael 2, R. Chisholm, A. Schwarz, S. Blandford, D. Fasoulis
K. Margaritis, J. Delbridge, Z. Jones, M. Waters, S. Bishop , P. Brough	Best	S. Barnes, S. Blandford, J. Simon, W. Simon, S. Keleher, N. Edwards

== Division 2 ==
2015 VAFA Division 2 season
- Date: 11 April − 12 September 2015
- Teams: 10
- Premiers: Old Paradians; 1st Division 2 premiership
- Minor premiers: Ivanhoe
- J Fullerton Medal: Timothy Harper (MHSOB − 19 votes); Dean Calcedo (Northern Blues − 19 votes)
- Leading goalkicker: Jake Munro (Richmond Central − 87 goals)
- Matches played: 94

=== Ladder ===
Pos	Team	Pld	W	L	D	PF	PA	PP	Pts	Qualification
1	Ivanhoe	18	16	2	0	2122	1187	178.8	64	Finals series
2	St John's	18	14	4	0	2089	1391	150.2	56	Finals series
3	Old Paradians (P)	18	12	6	0	1639	1220	134.3	48	Finals series
4	Northern Blues	18	12	6	0	1840	1573	117.0	48	Finals series
5	Old Eltham Collegians	18	11	7	0	1944	1498	129.8	44	
6	MHSOB	18	9	9	0	1576	1630	96.7	36	
7	Richmond Central	18	7	11	0	1793	1936	92.6	28	
8	Monash Gryphons	18	5	13	0	1523	1820	83.7	20	
9	Elsternwick	18	3	15	0	1355	2338	58.0	12	Relegation
10	South Melbourne Districts	18	1	17	0	1178	2466	47.8	4	Relegation

Rules for classification: 1) points; 2) percentage; 3) number of points for.
(P) Premiers

=== Finals ===
2015 VAFA Division 2 Grand Final
Saturday, 12 September (2:20pm)	Ivanhoe	def. by	Old Paradians	Highgate Recreation Reserve
3.4 (22); 3.7 (25); 4.11 (35); 5.13 (43)	Q1; Q2; Q3; Final	2.1 (13); 5.2 (32); 6.3 (39); 8.10 (58)
L. Minney 2, D. Jones, M. Lovell, K. Blackmore-Moore	Goals	J. Kandilakis 4, L. McCann 2, M. Bellizia, B. Holden
J. Harty, L. Roberts, L. Minney, M. Lovell, S. Zervides	Best	C. Kandilakis, D. Boundy, W. Jeffrey, S. Miller, M. Bellizia, S. Rehlicki

== Division 3 ==
2015 VAFA Division 3 season
- Date: 11 April − 13 September 2015
- Teams: 10
- Premiers: West Brunswick; 3rd Division 3 premiership
- Minor premiers: Emmaus St Leo's
- Hutchinson Medal: Paul Baranello (Emmaus St Leo's − 31 votes)
- Leading goalkicker: Ryan Harding (Emmaus St Leo's − 70 goals)
- Matches played: 94

=== Ladder ===
Pos	Team	Pld	W	L	D	PF	PA	PP	Pts	Qualification
1	Emmaus St Leo's	16	16	0	0	2077	964	215.5	64	Finals series
2	West Brunswick (P)	16	14	2	0	1680	773	217.3	56	Finals series
3	Aquinas	16	12	4	0	1463	1110	131.8	48	Finals series
4	Hawthorn	16	11	5	0	1492	1292	115.5	44	Finals series
5	Swinburne University	16	8	8	0	1377	1439	95.7	32	Finals series
6	UHS-VU	16	8	8	0	1126	1341	84.0	32	Finals series
7	Albert Park	16	5	11	0	1186	1399	84.8	20	
8	Power House	16	5	11	0	1164	1463	79.6	20	
9	Glen Eira	16	5	11	0	1003	1583	63.4	20	
10	La Trobe University	16	2	14	0	956	1411	67.8	8	
11	Eley Park	18	2	14	0	1143	1893	60.4	8	Relegation

Rules for classification: 1) points; 2) percentage; 3) number of points for.
(P) Premiers

=== Finals ===
2015 VAFA Division 3 Grand Final
Sunday, 13 September (2:15pm)	Emmaus St Leo's	def. by	West Brunswick	Trevor Barker Oval
2.2 (14); 2.3 (15); 7.8 (50); 7.11 (53)	Q1; Q2; Q3; Final	1.1 (7); 3.5 (23); 3.6 (24); 7.12 (54)
N. Baranello 2, C. Beluszar 2, M. McIver, J. Quirk, R. Harding	Goals	D. Muscat 2, B. Irving 2, L. Buckler, A. Gibson, S. Hulm
N. Baranello, C. Hogan, R. Stafford, A. McDougall, M. Catchpool, C. Lowther	Best	E. Lloyd, B. Simpson, W. Baker, C. Cashin, C. Germon, J. Simpson

== Division 4 ==
2015 VAFA Division 4 season
- Date: 11 April − 12 September 2015
- Teams: 10
- Premiers: Canterbury; 1st Division 4 premiership
- Minor premiers: Canterbury; 1st Division 4 minor premiership
- OJ Meehan Medal: Shane McLaren (Parkside − 30 votes)
- Leading goalkicker: Dale Collins (Westbourne Grammarians − 106 goals)
- Matches played: 94

=== Ladder ===
Pos	Team	Pld	W	L	D	PF	PA	PP	Pts	Qualification
1	Canterbury (P)	16	15	1	0	2163	830	260.6	60	Finals series
2	Westbourne Grammarians	16	14	2	0	2110	795	265.4	56	Finals series
3	Point Cook	16	13	3	0	1752	976	179.5	52	Finals series
4	Box Hill North	16	11	5	0	1712	1059	161.7	44	Finals series
5	Parkside	16	9	7	0	1500	1265	118.6	36	Finals series
6	North Brunswick	16	8	8	0	1525	1292	118.0	32	Finals series
7	Mt Lilydale	16	7	9	0	1364	1513	90.2	28	
8	Manningham Cobras	16	5	11	0	1200	1179	101.8	20	
9	South Mornington	16	3	13	0	952	2100	45.3	12	
10	Masala	16	2	14	0	771	2350	32.8	8	
11	Chadstone	16	1	15	0	658	2348	28.0	4	

Rules for classification: 1) points; 2) percentage; 3) number of points for.
(P) Premiers

=== Finals ===
2015 VAFA Division 4 Grand Final
Saturday, 12 September (2:15pm)	Parkside	def. by	Canterbury	Garvey Oval
0.1 (1); 2.2 (14); 5.3 (33); 6.8 (44)	Q1; Q2; Q3; Final	2.2 (14); 5.4 (34); 7.8 (50); 8.11 (59)
S. Potter 2, R. Parsons 2, S. McLaren, D. Gresham	Goals	C. Woods 2, D. Wissell 2, L. Chapman, A. Baker, N. Szabo, J. Gillen
D. Gresham, S. McLaren, C. Virgona, C. Hogg, T. Wise, B. McGillien	Best	L. Chapman, J. Gillen, T. Pearce, C. Woods, D. Wissell, T. Nichols
