= Monash Blues Football Club =

Names
- Full name: Monash University Blues Football Club
- Former name: Monash University Football Club (1961−1963)
- Nickname(s): Blues, Ashes, Ashers

2024 season
- Home-and-away season: VAFA: 9th VAFAW: 10th
- Leading goalkicker: VAFA: Nicholas Darling (22); VAFAW: Clare Konstanty (8)
- Best and fairest: VAFA: TBC; VAFAW: TBC

Club details
- Founded: 1961; 65 years ago
- Colours: Turquoise Silver Gold
- Coach: VAFA: Damien Philpott; VAFAW: Shane Chapman; U19's VAFA: Cam Walkinshaw
- Premierships: VAFA (5): 1962; 1987; 1996; 2003; 2022; VAFAW (1): 2023; U19's VAFA (1): 2002
- Ground: Frearson Oval

Other information
- Official website: monashblues.com.au

The Monash Blues Football Club is an Australian rules football club that represents Monash University in the Victorian Amateur Football Association (VAFA).

The club was formed in 1961 as Monash University, changing its name to the Blues when the Monash Whites joined the VAFA in 1964. In 2001, the two teams merged, and the Whites now compete as the Blues' Club XVIII team.

As of 2024, the club's men's team competes in the Premier C division of the VAFA, while the women's team is in the Premier Division of the VAFA Women's (VAFAW).

== History ==
Monash University Football Club was formed in 1961, shortly after Monash University opened on 13 March of that year. Whilst too late to be accepted into a local competition for the 1961 season, the club played internal matches, as well as matches against teams from Newman College, Ormond College and Burwood Teachers' College. In 1962, the club entered the VAFA, going undefeated and winning the E Section premiership in its inaugural season.

1967 marked the beginning of the club's most successful decade, including two periods in A Section. The club was first in the highest division from 1969 until 1973, with its best finishing position in fifth place in 1970.

After being relegated, the club made the 1974 B Section grand final and, although they lost to Old Trinity, immediately returned to A Section. The club avoided relegation in 1975, but finished last in 1976 and was sent back to B Section, beginning a period of decline for the Blues.

The Blues lost the 1986 D Section grand final to Balaclava, but finally won its second senior premiership in 1987 with a 25-point victory over Kew in the C Section grand final. Further senior premierships came in 1996 and 2003.

The club established a women's team in 2016 and it entered the inaugural VAFAW season in Development Division 1 in 2017.

In 2022, the Blues won their first women's premiership, defeating Collegians by three points in the VAFAW reserves grand final. One month later, the club's senior men's team won its fifth premiership with a 21-point victory over Old Geelong in Premier C.

== Monash Whites ==
Monash Whites Football Club

Names
- Full name: Monash Whites Football Club
- Nickname(s): Whites, Ashes, Ashers

Club details
- Founded: 1964 (as a team); 1980 (separate entity)
- Dissolved: 2001 (remerged)
- Colours: Turquoise Silver
- Premierships: VAFA (2): 1975; 1998

Other information
- Official website: mwfc.net.au

Monash University established a second team in 1964, the Monash Whites, which entered F Section. However, after just two seasons, the Whites (along with F Section itself) went into recess for five years.

The Whites were replaced by a junior side in 1966, but as numbers continued to grow, the Whites were revived in 1971 in the reformed F Section. The first Whites premiership came in 1972, winning the F Section reserves grand final. A senior premiership came in 1975, defeating Heatherton in the F Section grand final.

Despite the premiership, the Whites struggled in E Section in 1976, winning only four games and being relegated back to F Section for the 1977 season.

At the end of the 1979 VAFA season, the Blues and the Whites split, with the Monash Whites Football Club being established as a separate entity.

The Whites' end-of-season review in 1980 wrote:

"The start of the season began in reality at the end of the 1979 season when there was a big push from a lot of quarters to have the Whites thrown out of the VAFA. The first push came in the form of the Monash Blues; who in their wisdom decided it would be for the betterment of all concerned if the Whites did no longer exist. We were blamed for all sorts of things as well as the Blues bad showing during the year. So, the Blues thought, they had the right to decide where 40 odd players would not be playing in 1980."

The club struggled on its own, unable to win a premiership post-split until 1998, when they defeated Kew by 11 points in Club XVIII Section 2.

In 2000, the Blues and Whites merged. The Whites played its final game as a separate club in the first Club XVIII semi-final, before merging and becoming the Blues' Club XVIII team at the start of the 2001 season.

== Women's ==
Monash Blues

Names
- Full name: Monash Blues Football Club
- Nickname(s): Blues, Two Blues

Club details
- Founded: 2016
- Competition: VAFA
- Coach: Shane Chapman
- Captain(s): Sydney Lock & Sarah-Jade Rose
- Premierships: 1

The Monash Blues established their women's program in 2016 and entered the inaugural VAFA Women's competition in 2017, competing in Development Division 1. The women's program has since progressed through the VAFA's divisional structure, reaching the Premier B competition in 2018 and 2019 before eventually winning the Premier B premiership in 2023. The club's women's program also fields a reserves team, which won the Premier B Women's Reserve premiership in 2022.

=== Premierships ===
Seniors

The Monash Blues women's senior team has won one VAFA premiership, winning the Premier B premiership in 2023, with Monash defeating Old Yarra Cobras 3.3 (21) to 3.1 (19) in the Premier B Grand Final at Piranha Park.

2023 Premier B Women's Grand Final
| Monash Blues | 3.3 (21) |
| Old Yarra Cobras | 3.1 (19) |
16 September 2023; Piranha Park, Coburg

Reserves

The women's reserves team also won the Premier B Women's Reserve premiership in 2022, defeating Collegians 3.3 (21) to 2.7 (19).

2022 Premier B Women's Reserve Grand Final
| Monash Blues | 3.3 (21) |
| Collegians | 2.7 (19) |
14 August 2022; Downer Oval, Williamstown

=== Season Summary ===
==== Seniors ====
| Year | League | Division | Finish | W | L | D | Coach | Captain | Best and fairest | Leading goalkicker | | Ref |
|---|---|---|---|---|---|---|---|---|---|---|---|---|
| 2016 | N/A | (Exhibition match only) | | | | | Ian Mills | (Exhibition match only) | | | | |
| 2017 | VAFAW | Division 1 | 7th | 4 | 10 | 0 | Ian Mills | Ella Stephenson | Xanthea Dewez | Molly McFarlane | 23 | |
| 2018 | VAFAW | Prem B Blue | 3rd | 9 | 4 | 1 | Ian Mills | Ella Stephenson | Xanthea Dewez | Ella Stephenson | 22 | |
| 2019 | VAFAW | Premier B | 3rd | 8 | 4 | 0 | Ian Mills | Ella Stephenson | Xanthea Dewez | Ella Stephenson | 36 | |
| 2020 | VAFAW | Premier B | (No season) | | | | Ian Mills | Ella Stephenson | (No season) | | | |
| 2021 | VAFAW | Premier B | 5th | 4 | 6 | 0 | Ian Mills | Ella Stephenson | Ainslee Elliott | Ella Stephenson | 14 | |
| 2022 | VAFAW | Premier B | 8th | 2 | 12 | 0 | Shane Chapman | Ella Stephenson; Ainslee Elliott | Ainslee Elliott; Emily Conroy | Emma Draffin; Stacey Barbagallo | 6 | |
| 2023 | VAFAW | Premier B | 1st | 15 | 2 | 1 | Shane Chapman | Ainslee Elliott | Ainslee Elliott | Molly McFarlane | 24 | |
| 2024 | VAFAW | Premier | 10th | 2 | 16 | 0 | Shane Chapman | Alicia Myers | | Clare Konstanty | 8 | |
| 2025 | VAFAW | Division 1 | 2nd | 12 | 4 | 0 | | | | | | |
| 2026 | VAFAW | Division 1 | 4th | 9 | 6 | 1 | | | | | | |

=== 2017 season ===
Monash Blues entered the inaugural VAFA Women's competition in 2017, competing in Development Division 1. The Blues finished seventh on the ladder with four wins and ten losses from their 14 matches.

=== 2018 season ===
Monash progressed to Premier B Blue in 2018 and enjoyed a significant improvement in its second season. The Blues finished third with a record of nine wins, four losses and one draw, scoring 490 points and conceding 274. Monash qualified for the finals, although the premiership was ultimately won by St Mary's Salesian.

=== 2019 season ===
Monash remained in Premier B in 2019 and again finished third, recording eight wins and four losses. The Blues progressed through to the preliminary final, where they were defeated by Caulfield Grammarians by eight points, bringing their season to an end.

=== 2020 season ===
The 2020 VAFA season was cancelled because of the COVID-19 pandemic, meaning Monash did not play a competitive senior women's season.

=== 2021 season ===
Monash returned to competition in 2021 in Premier B. The season was curtailed because of the COVID-19 pandemic, with the Blues finishing fifth after recording four wins and six losses. Monash narrowly missed the finals, finishing one win outside the top four.

=== 2022 season ===
The 2022 season proved to be a difficult one for the senior side, with Monash finishing eighth in Premier B with two wins and twelve losses. Despite the senior team's struggles, the women's program achieved its first VAFA premiership when the Monash Blues reserves defeated Collegians 3.3 (21) to 2.7 (19) in the Premier B Women's Reserve Grand Final.

=== 2023 season ===
The 2023 season marked a dramatic transformation in the history of the Monash Blues women's program. Having finished last in Premier B in 2022 with only two wins, Monash entered the 2023 season under the leadership of coach Shane Chapman and immediately established itself as one of the competition's strongest sides.

The Blues began the season with five consecutive victories and maintained an outstanding defensive record throughout the home-and-away campaign. Across 17 matches, Monash recorded 15 wins, one draw and one loss, finishing on top of the Premier B ladder and earning a place in the finals.

The VAFA later highlighted the turnaround as one of the defining moments of its 2023 season, describing it as “MONASH CLIMB FROM LAST TO FIRST WITHIN 12 MONTHS”. The VAFA noted that Monash had finished the previous season with a 2–12 record before becoming Premier B premiers 12 months later. It also highlighted the team's defensive strength, with Monash restricting its opponents to one goal or fewer in 14 of its 17 matches.

Monash entered the finals as the minor premiers. In the semi-final, the Blues defeated Mazenod Old Collegians 2.10 (22) to 1.1 (7), with the victory securing their place in the Grand Final.

The Grand Final was played against the Old Yarra Cobras at Piranha Park on 16 September 2023. In a tightly contested match, Monash led 1.2 to 0.0 at quarter-time before Old Yarra fought back to level the contest at half-time. The Cobras continued to challenge the Blues in the second half, with the scores remaining close throughout the final term.

Monash ultimately prevailed by just two points, defeating Old Yarra 3.3 (21) to 3.1 (19) to claim the 2023 Premier B Women's premiership. Ainslee Elliott was instrumental in the victory, kicking two of Monash's three goals, while Ella Draffin kicked the other. Elliott, Ella Stephenson, Jessica Dallas, Tahlia Heath, Alicia Myers and Sarah Rose were named among Monash's best players.

The premiership represented the first senior women's premiership in Monash Blues history. It also completed one of the most remarkable single-season turnarounds in the VAFA, with the Blues going from last place and a 2–12 record in 2022 to premiers with a 15–1–1 home-and-away record in 2023. The achievement earned Monash promotion into the William Buck Premier Women's competition for 2024.

=== 2024 season ===
Following their 2023 premiership, Monash was promoted to the William Buck Premier Women's competition for 2024 alongside fellow Grand Finalists Old Yarra Cobras. The move represented the highest level at which the women's program had competed.

Monash finished tenth in its first Premier season with two wins and sixteen losses. The Blues recorded their first victory in the competition in Round 10, defeating Old Yarra Cobras.

=== 2025 season ===
Monash competed in Division 1 in 2025 and produced another strong season. The Blues finished second on the ladder with twelve wins and four losses, behind Glen Eira/Old McKinnon on percentage.

Monash progressed through the finals to reach the Division 1 Women's Grand Final. After losing the second semi-final to Glen Eira/Old McKinnon, the Blues defeated Whitefriars in the preliminary final before again meeting Glen Eira/Old McKinnon in the Grand Final. Monash was defeated by 21 points, finishing the season as runners-up.

=== 2026 season ===
In 2026, Monash competed in Division 1 Women's. The Blues finished fourth at the end of the home-and-away season with nine wins, six losses and one draw, earning a place in the finals.

Monash faced Marcellin in the first semi-final but was eliminated, ending the season in fourth place. The result continued the club's recent period of finals appearances following the 2023 premiership and 2025 Grand Final appearance.

== Under 19s ==
Monash Blues Under-19s

Names
- Full name: Monash Blues Football Club Under-19s
- Nickname(s): Ashes, Ashers

Club details
- Colours: Turquoise Silver Gold
- Competition: VAFA (U-19's)
- Premierships: 2002

The Monash Blues field a Men's Under 19s side, one of the club's six teams alongside the men's Seniors, Reserves and Thirds and the women's Seniors and Reserves. The Under 19s serve as a pathway into the club's senior teams, with players who come through the age group often progressing directly into the Reserves or Seniors. One example Dan Carmody who debuted with the Blues' Under 19s in 2005, made his senior debut later that year, and went on to play 116 games for the club, featuring in the 2008 Reserves premiership and 2012 Thirds premiership sides.

=== Premierships ===
The Under 19s won the "Under 19 Blue" premiership in 2002, defeating AJAX 21.14 (140) to 6.11 (47) the club's only Under-19 premiership on record thus far.

2002 Under 19 Blue Grand Final
| Monash Blues | 21.14 (140) |
| AJAX | 6.11 (47) |

=== Season summary ===
| Year | Division | Finish | W | L | D | Finals | Ref |
|---|---|---|---|---|---|---|---|
| 2022 | Holmesglen U19 Division 3 Men's | 3rd | 8 | 8 | 0 | Semi-finalist | |
| 2023 | Holmesglen U19 Division 2 Men's | 10th | 2 | 15 | 0 | Did not qualify | |
| 2024 | Holmesglen U19 Division 3 Men's | 7th | 3 | 14 | 0 | Did not qualify | |
| 2025 | Holmesglen U19 Division 3 Men's | 6th | 6 | 9 | 1 | Did not qualify | |
| 2026 | Holmesglen U19 South Division 3 Men's | 3rd | 8 | 8 | 0 | Grand finalist | |

==== 2024 season ====
The Under 19s finished the 2024 home-and-away season in seventh position out of eight teams in Holmesglen U19 Division 3 Men's, with a record of 3 wins and 14 losses.

==== 2025 season ====
The Under 19s finished the 2025 home-and-away season in sixth position out of ten teams in Holmesglen U19 Division 3 Men's, with a record of 6 wins, 9 losses and a draw. The season featured a 90-point win over UHS-VU in Round 10 and a 69-point win over Whitefriars in Round 11, though the team also suffered heavy losses, including a 142-point defeat to Old Brighton in Round 2 and an 88-point defeat to St Bedes/Mentone in Round 13. The Blues did not qualify for the finals series.

==== 2026 season ====
The 2026 Under 19s competed in Holmesglen U19 South Division 3 Men's. Monash lost twice to Oakleigh during the home-and-away season, by 36 points in Round 7 and 50 points in Round 11, before narrowly defeating them by 9 points in the final home-and-away round. The team finished the home-and-away season in third position, behind minor premiers St Kevin's and Oakleigh.

The 2026 Under 19s are coached by Cam Walkinshaw, who joined the club from South Yarra Football Club (SFNL).

In the finals series, Monash defeated Beaumaris by 64 points in the first semi-final on 29 August, before defeating minor premiers St Kevin's by 23 points in the preliminary final on 5 September, 12.10 (82) to 9.5 (59). The result set up a grand final against Oakleigh, scheduled for 12 September 2026.

The team named for the preliminary final was: Hayden Balcam, Charlie Chappel, William Hipwell, Jimmy Greenwood, Ragavan Jenaddarsan, Bradley Carter, Xavier Bull, Edward Sherwin, Henry Steele (c), Daniel Davies, Sebastian Harvey, Fraser Carr, Rory McMillan, Joshua Triplett, Henry McNeill, Edgar Birzulis, Mitchell Shaw, Ahmed Tawfik, Melvic Pambai, Henry Edmonston, Daniel Spillman, Marcus O'Brien, Cody Porteus and Will Boyes.

A win in the grand final would be the U19's second Under-19 premiership, and its first since 2002.

== Seasons ==
| Premiers | Grand Finalist | Minor premiers | Finals appearance | Wooden spoon | Division best and fairest | Division leading goalkicker |

=== Men's ===
==== Seniors ====
| Year | League | Division | Finish | W | L | D | Coach | Captain | Best and fairest | Leading goalkicker | | Ref |
|---|---|---|---|---|---|---|---|---|---|---|---|---|
| 1961 | N/A | (Exhibition matches only) | | | | | | | | | | |
| 1962 | VAFA | E Section | 1st | | | | Peter Longney | Peter Longney | Peter Longney | | | |
| 1963 | VAFA | D Section | 2nd | | | | Lloyd Middleton | Peter Longney | Peter Robinson | | | |
| 1964 | VAFA | C Section | 7th | | | | Lloyd Middleton | Peter Robinson | Peter Robinson | Peter McDonald | 50 | |
| 1965 | VAFA | C Section | 4th | | | | Lloyd Middleton | Paul White | Colin Bell | | | |
| 1966 | VAFA | C Section | 8th | | | | Lloyd Middleton | Mick Myers | Rod Evans | | | |
| 1967 | VAFA | C Section | 2nd | | | | Clyde Laidlaw | Peter Rattray | Jack Bray | | | |
| 1968 | VAFA | B Section | 2nd | | | | Clyde Laidlaw | Peter Rattray | David Hone | | | |
| 1969 | VAFA | A Section | 8th | | | | Sam Birtles | Peter Rattray | Jeff Thomas | | | |
| 1970 | VAFA | A Section | 5th | | | | Sam Birtles | Nich Rogers | Stuart Galbraith | | | |
| 1971 | VAFA | A Section | 6th | | | | Sam Birtles | Phil Knight | Stuart Galbraith | | | |
| 1972 | VAFA | A Section | 8th | | | | Clyde Laidlaw | Phil Knight | David Wilson | | | |
| 1973 | VAFA | A Section | 9th | | | | Clyde Laidlaw | Ross Booth | Ross Booth | | | |
| 1974 | VAFA | B Section | 2nd | 16 | 2 | 0 | Gary Rasmussen | Ross Booth | Ross Booth | C. Moore | 68 | |
| 1975 | VAFA | A Section | 8th | | | | Bill Harding | Mike Sweetland | Peter Golding | | | |
| 1976 | VAFA | A Section | 10th | | | | Bill Harding | John Syme | Dave Bickford | | | |
| 1977 | VAFA | B Section | 8th | | | | Daryl Cranch | Roger Olds | Bruce Anderson | | | |
| 1978 | VAFA | B Section | 6th | | | | Jeff Thomas | Dave Bickford | Roger Olds | | | |
| 1979 | VAFA | B Section | 7th | | | | Stuart Schneider | Bruce Anderson | Garry Black | | | |
| 1980 | VAFA | B Section | 8th | | | | Stuart Schneider | Roger Olds | Barry McKenzie | | | |
| 1981 | VAFA | B Section | 8th | | | | Denis Flett | Barry McKenzie | Mark Kershaw | | | |
| 1982 | VAFA | B Section | 5th | | | | Denis Flett | Mick Rodger | Craig Lovel | | | |
| 1983 | VAFA | B Section | 8th | | | | Denis Flett | Peter Bergin | David Petrie | | | |
| 1984 | VAFA | B Section | 10th | | | | Ian Edney | Peter Bergin | Anthony Loorham | | | |
| 1985 | VAFA | C Section | 9th | | | | Brian Ford | Peter Bergin | Chris Deighton | | | |
| 1986 | VAFA | D Section | 2nd | | | | Brian Ford | Ivan Sest; Peter Forbes | Peter Forbes | | | |
| 1987 | VAFA | C Section | 1st | 14 | 4 | 0 | Brian Ford | Peter Forbes | John Quin | | | |
| 1988 | VAFA | B Section | 5th | | | | Brian Ford | Andrew McGregor | John Quin | | | |
| 1989 | VAFA | B Section | 7th | | | | Brian Ford | Jamie Sturgess | Jamie Sturgess | | | |
| 1990 | VAFA | B Section | 10th | | | | Trevor Read | Jamie Sturgess | Anthony Quin | | | |
| 1991 | VAFA | C Section | 2nd | | | | Brian Ford | Jamie Sturgess | Barry Seaton | | | |
| 1992 | VAFA | B Section | 9th | | | | Brian Ford | Andrew McGregor | Ian Kohler | | | |
| 1993 | VAFA | C Section | 7th | | | | Brian Ford | Andrew McGregor | Greg Hipwell | | | |
| 1994 | VAFA | C Section | 6th | | | | Brian Ford | Dan Carman | Adrian Barker | | | |
| 1995 | VAFA | C Section | 9th | | | | Brian Ford | Dan Carman | Greg Hipwell | | | |
| 1996 | VAFA | D Section | 1st | | | | Dave Rogers | Greg Hipwell | Greg Hipwell | | | |
| 1997 | VAFA | C Section | 9th | | | | Dave Rogers | Tony Kiers; Jeremy Smith | Dave Rogers | | | |
| 1998 | VAFA | D Section | 5th | | | | Dave Rogers | Jeremy Smith | Julian Smith | | | |
| 1999 | VAFA | D Section | 3rd | | | | Dave Rogers | John Caldwell | Sam McGee | | | |
| 2000 | VAFA | D1 Section | 3rd | | | | Dave Rogers | Julian Smith | Sam McGee | | | |
| 2001 | VAFA | D1 Section | 8th | | | | Dave Rogers; Tim Powell | Julian Smith | Liam Holloway | | | |
| 2002 | VAFA | D1 Section | 8th | 7 | 11 | 0 | Tim Powell | Liam Holloway | George Smyth | | | |
| 2003 | VAFA | D1 Section | 1st | | | | Tim Powell | Liam Holloway; Julian Smith | Julian Smith | | | |
| 2004 | VAFA | C Section | 3rd | | | | John Edgar | Liam Holloway; Julian Smith | George Smyth | | | |
| 2005 | VAFA | C Section | 7th | 7 | 11 | 0 | John Edgar | Julian Smith | Michael Davidson | | | |
| 2006 | VAFA | C Section | 7th | 7 | 10 | 1 | Andrew McGregor | Julian Smith | Aaron Williams | | | |
| 2007 | VAFA | C Section | 8th | 4 | 13 | 1 | Andrew McGregor | George Smyth | George Smyth | | | |
| 2008 | VAFA | C Section | 7th | 8 | 10 | 0 | Andrew McGregor | Andrew Hickey; Aaron Williams | Michael Davidson | | | |
| 2009 | VAFA | C Section | 10th | 3 | 15 | 0 | Bruce Waldron | Brendan Waldron | Tim McKenzie | | | |
| 2010 | VAFA | Division 1 | 2nd | | | | Tim Powell | Jordan Bell; George Smyth | George Smyth | | | |
| 2011 | VAFA | Premier C | 8th | 6 | 10 | 2 | Tim Powell | George Smyth | Joel Bartram | | | |
| 2012 | VAFA | Premier C | 9th | 3 | 15 | 0 | Tim Powell | Jordan Bell; George Smyth | Andrew Hickey | | | |
| 2013 | VAFA | Premier C | 4th | 13 | 5 | 0 | Hayden Stanton | Sam Baring | Andrew Young | | | |
| 2014 | VAFA | Premier C | 4th | 13 | 5 | 0 | Hayden Stanton | Sam Baring | Tim McKenzie | | | |
| 2015 | VAFA | Premier C | 2nd | 15 | 3 | 0 | Paul Groves | Sam Baring | Maddison Hardiman | | | |
| 2016 | VAFA | Premier B | 4th | 11 | 7 | 0 | Paul Groves | Sam Baring | Maddison Hardiman | | | |
| 2017 | VAFA | Premier B | 4th | 10 | 8 | 0 | Mark Passador | Andrew Young; Maddison Hardiman | Joe Harrison | | | |
| 2018 | VAFA | Premier B | 8th | 4 | 14 | 0 | Mark Passador | Maddison Hardiman | Nicholas Argento | | | |
| 2019 | VAFA | Premier B | 10th | 4 | 14 | 0 | Mark Passador | Keegan Mason | Mac Cameron | | | |
| 2020 | VAFA | Premier C | (No season) | | | | Mark Passador | Keegan Mason | (No season) | | | |
| 2021 | VAFA | Premier C | 1st | 10 | 1 | 0 | Mark Passador | Joe Cosgriff; Daniel Easson | Daniel Easson | | | |
| 2022 | VAFA | Premier C | 1st | 18 | 2 | 0 | Mark Passador | Joe Cosgriff; Daniel Easson | MacGregor Cameron | Nicholas Darling | 69 | |
| 2023 | VAFA | Premier B | 10th | 1 | 17 | 0 | Dylan Cousins | Daniel Easson | Daniel Easson | James Flett | 24 | |
| 2024 | VAFA | Premier C | 9th | 2 | 16 | 0 | Dylan Cousins | Charles Cosgriff | | Nicholas Darling | 22 | |
| 2025 | VAFA | Division 1 | 8th | 5 | 13 | 0 | | | | | | |
| 2026 | VAFA | Division 1 | 8th | 3 | 13 | 1 | | | | | | |

- Although the Monash Blues finished first in 2021, no finals series was held as the season was curtailed due to the COVID-19 pandemic
- The following players won the Division Best & Fairest Award but did not win the club's Best & Fairest in the same year: 1986 D Section Andrew McGregor; 1991 C Section Jamie Sturgess; 1999 D Section A. Anderson; 2005 C Section George Smyth; 2021 Premier C MacGregor Cameron.

=== 1962 E Section ===
1962 E Section Grand Final
| Monash University | 8.9 (57) |
| Old Haileyburians | 2.11 (23) |

Monash University grand final team
| Position | | | |
|---|---|---|---|
| Backs | GA Richards | IGS Fleming | GM Sinclair |
| Half-backs | GI Kidd | DT Charles | W Prior |
| Centres | BJR Gartner | DJ Feltham | TR Buxton |
| Half-forwards | JW Lynch | TP Longney | JD Fischer |
| Forwards | JR Cousland | PJ McDonald | RD Jordan |
| Ruck | PJ White | JP Young | PA McCallum |
| Reserves | KG Judd | MA Caplan | |
| Coach | Lloyd Middleton | | |
| Manager | Doug Ellis | | |

=== 1967 C Section Reserve ===
1967 C Section Reserve
| Monash University | Premiers |

Monash University premiership team
| Position |
|---|
Team sheet is unknown.

=== 1972 A Section Reserve ===
1972 A Section Reserve
| Monash Blues | Premiers |
| Coburg | |

Monash Blues premiership team
| Position |
|---|
Team sheet is unknown.

=== 1972 F Section Reserve ===
1972 F Section Reserve
| Monash Whites | 19.18 (132) |
| Old Camberwell Grammarians | 6.6 (42) |

Monash Whites premiership team
| Position |
|---|
Team sheet is unknown.

=== 1974 B Section Reserve ===
1974 B Section Reserve
| Monash Blues | Premiers |
| Ivanhoe | |

Monash Blues premiership team
| Position |
|---|
Team sheet is unknown.

=== 1975 F Section ===
1975 F Section Grand Final
| Monash Whites | 16.10 (106) |
| Heatherton | 13.13 (91) |

Monash Whites grand final team
| Position | | | |
|---|---|---|---|
| Backs | Dennis Smith | Paul O'Shea | Steve Meredith |
| Half-backs | Dick Lee | Peter Milford | Phil Picone |
| Centres | Ken Rosenhain | Graeme Peacock | Peter Darling |
| Half-forwards | Geoff Tellefson | Colin Crook | Frank Farnsworth |
| Forwards | Paul Mitchell | Richard Sterling | Lee Kok |
| Ruck | Ross McKenzie (c) | Paul James | Chris Wallis |
| Reserves | Neil Hewson | John Chisholm | |
| Coach | Steve Burley | | |
| Assistant | Sven Riisik | | |

=== 1978 B Section Reserve ===
1978 B Section Reserve
| Monash Blues | Premiers |

Monash Blues premiership team
| Position |
|---|
Team sheet is unknown.

=== 1987 C Section ===
1987 C Section Grand Final
| Monash Blues | 13.18 (96) |
| Kew | 10.11 (71) |

Monash Blues grand final team
| Position | | | |
|---|---|---|---|
| Backs | Michael Hay | Chris Roberts | Richard Culvenor |
| Half-backs | Adrian Barker | Dan Carman | John Quin |
| Centres | Greg Hipwell | Jamie Sturgess | Anthony Kiers |
| Half-forwards | Peter Forbes | Ian Hildebrand | Brad Cornwell |
| Forwards | Justin Alexander | Peter Little | Stevie Connelly |
| Ruck | Tim Gill | Andrew McGregor | Graham Gale |
| Interchange | Ian Kohler | John Johnstone | |
| Coach | Brian Ford | | |
| Manager | Keith Frearson | | |

=== 1995 C Section Reserve ===
1995 C Section Reserve Grand Final
| Monash Blues | 9.9 (63) |
| AJAX | 9.3 (57) |

Monash Blues grand final team
| Position |
|---|
Team sheet is unknown.

=== 1996 D Section ===
1996 D Section Grand Final
| Monash Blues | 11.6 (72) |
| St Leo's Emmaus Wattle Park | 7.4 (46) |

Monash Blues grand final team
| Position | | | |
|---|---|---|---|
| Backs | Jeremy Smith | Dan Carman | Paul Tuohey |
| Half-backs | John Caldwell | Cameron Logan | Matt Newman |
| Centres | Dave Rogers | Adrian Barker | Anthony Kiers |
| Half-forwards | Julian Smith | Matt Donnelly | Cameron Barker |
| Forwards | Jonathan Koop | Kynan Ford | Leigh Baring |
| Ruck | Andrew Headberry | Greg Hipwell (c) | Justin Alexander |
| Interchange | Richard Anderson | Bernard Dowsley | Dave Trumble |
| Coach | Dave Rogers | | |
| Manager | Keith Frearson | | |

=== 1996 D Section Reserve ===
1996 D Section Reserve Grand Final
| Monash Blues | 10.17 (77) |
| St Leo's Emmaus Wattle Park | 1.4 (10) |

Monash Blues grand final team
| Position |
|---|
Team sheet is unknown.

=== 1998 Club XVIII (2) ===
1998 Club XVIII (2) Grand Final
| Monash Whites | 8.11 (59) |
| Kew | 7.6 (48) |

Monash Whites grand final team
| Position |
|---|
Team sheet is unknown.

=== 2002 D1 Section Reserve ===
2002 D1 Section Reserve Grand Final
| Monash Blues | 7.9 (51) |
| AJAX | 7.8 (50) |

Monash Blues grand final team
| Position |
|---|
Team sheet is unknown.

=== 2002 Under 19 Blue ===
2002 Under 19 Blue Grand Final
| Monash Blues | 21.14 (140) |
| AJAX | 6.11 (47) |

Monash Blues grand final team
| Position |
|---|
Team sheet is unknown.

=== 2003 D1 Section ===
2003 D1 Section Grand Final
| Monash Blues | 13.18 (96) |
| AJAX | 7.14 (56) |

Monash Blues grand final team
| Position | | | |
|---|---|---|---|
| Backs | Paul Farrar | Grant Chessari | Shane Chapman |
| Half-backs | Luke Creamer | Matt Payne | Grant Dodd |
| Centres | Tom Craven | Brock MacKenzie | Andrew Hickey |
| Half-forwards | Christian Gregory | Liam Holloway (c) | Ben Nind |
| Forwards | Scott Grace | Tim Blackley | Sam Hawkins |
| Ruck | Aaron Williams | George Smyth | Julian Smith (c) |
| Interchange | Ryan Turton | Conor O'Sullivan | Justin Main |
| Coach | Tim Powell | | |
| Assistant | Matt Newman | | |

=== 2018 Thirds Section 5 ===
2018 Thirds Section 5 Grand Final
| Monash Blues | 11.2 (68) |
| Kew | 6.7 (43) |

Monash Blues grand final team
| Position |
|---|
Team sheet is unknown.

=== 2022 Premier C Men's ===
2022 Premier C Men's Grand Final
| Monash Blues | 8.9 (57) |
| Old Geelong | 5.6 (36) |
23 September 2022; Trevor Barker Oval, Sandringham

Monash Blues grand final team
| Position | | | |
|---|---|---|---|
| Backs | Jordan Storer | Jake Meade | Jimmy Baring |
| Half-backs | Charlie Simpson | Joe Cosgriff (c) | Alexander Bennett |
| Centres | Nicholas Argento | Daniel Easson (c) | Zacchary Ledin |
| Half-forwards | James Flett | Mitch King | Riley Smart |
| Forwards | Matthew Davidson | Nicholas Darling | Tom Le Lievre |
| Ruck | Macgregor Cameron | Charles Cosgriff | Beau Harris |
| Interchange | Brayden Price | Lachlan Buck | Sam Le Lievre |
| Interchange | Sam Simpson | | |
| Emergencies | Matthew Price | Noah Angus | |
| Coach | Mark Passador | | |
| Assistants | Alan Carter & Alexander Andrews | | |

=== 2022 Premier B Women's Reserve ===
2022 Premier B Women's Reserve Grand Final
| Monash Blues | 3.3 (21) |
| Collegians | 2.7 (19) |
14 August 2022; Downer Oval, Williamstown

Monash Blues grand final team
| Position | | | |
|---|---|---|---|
| Backs | Katie Tunley | Allison Rankin | Eliza Millen |
| Half-backs | Stephanie Murphy | Kelly Ferguson | Saskia Dekker |
| Centres | Octavia Thompson | Caitlin Williams | Claire Paulet |
| Half-forwards | Jessica Demeo | Jacqui Greer | Amy Kirby |
| Forwards | Molly McFarlane (c) | Sancia Bingham | Jacinta Kimberley |
| Ruck | Clare Jackson | Molly Ewens (vc) | Natasha Newman |
| Interchange | Alice Peddle | Amaya Postlethwaite | Emily Woods |
| Interchange | India Marshall | Hannah DeBuhr | Josie Gallagher |
| Emergencies | Vanessa Calcinotto | Jess Bennett | Skye Blackshaw |
| Coach | Nick Henderson | | |

=== 2023 Premier B Women's ===
2023 Premier B Women's Grand Final
| Monash Blues | 3.3 (21) |
| Old Yarra Cobras | 3.1 (19) |
16 September 2023; Piranha Park, Coburg

Monash Blues grand final team
| Position | | | |
|---|---|---|---|
| Backs | Saskia Dekker | Tessa Heath | Jasmin Baker |
| Half-backs | Abbie Hansen | Alicia Myers | Anna Purtill |
| Centres | Tara Moynihan | Eliza Grills | Caitlin Linehan |
| Half-forwards | Emily Conroy | Sarah Rose | Natasha Newman |
| Forwards | Emma Draffin | Chloe Gibson | Johannah Dallas |
| Ruck | Ella Stephenson | Ainslee Elliott (c) | Brook Thompson |
| Interchange | Eliza Millen | Gabrielle Koster | Caitlin Williams |
| Interchange | Sancia Bingham | Molly McFarlane | Stacey Barbagallo |
| Emergencies | Laura Daniel | Sydney Lock | Jacqui Greer |
| Coach | Shane Chapman | | |
| Assistants | Nick Henderson & Samantha Rodgers | | |
