= 2024 VAFA Women's season =

7th season of the VAFA Women's

- Date: 13 April − 22 September 2024
- Teams: 74

The 2024 VAFA Women's season was the seventh season of the VAFA Women's (VAFAW) competition. The season began on 13 April and concluded on 22 September, with 74 teams competing across six divisions. Unlike the VAFA men's competition, there was no promotion and relegation system, although regrading took place following round 4.

== Association membership ==
Although originally scheduled to compete in Division 4, the AJAX Football Club combined its women's side with Old Camberwell in order for both clubs to continue competing.

The Westbourne Grammarians Football Club returned to the VAFW after being in recess for the 2023 season.

== Premier ==
2024 Premier Women's season
- Date: 13 April − 22 September 2024
- Teams: 10
- Premiers: Old Scotch; 1st Premier premiership
- Minor premiers: Old Scotch
- Best and fairest: Dakota Villiva (Kew − 31 votes)
- Leading goalkicker: Eloise Defina (Old Scotch − 34 goals)

Old Scotch won the Premier Division premiership for the first time, defeating St Kevin's by 32 points in the grand final. It was the first of two senior premierships won by Old Scotch in 2024, with the club also winning the Premier Division premiership in the VAFA men's competition.

=== Ladder ===
Pos	Team	Pld	W	L	D	PF	PA	PP	Pts	Qualification
1	Old Scotch (P)	18	17	1	0	1026	246	417.1	68	Finals series
2	St Kevin's	18	17	1	0	1012	285	355.1	68	Finals series
3	Kew	18	12	6	0	717	408	175.7	46	Finals series
4	Caulfield Grammarians	18	11	6	1	785	591	132.8	46	Finals series
5	West Brunswick	18	10	8	0	506	617	82.0	40	
6	Collegians	18	9	9	0	577	631	91.4	36	
7	Coburg	18	4	14	0	478	812	58.9	16	
8	Old Yarra Cobras	18	4	14	0	401	827	48.5	16	
9	Melbourne University	18	3	14	1	463	763	60.7	14	
10	Monash Blues	18	2	16	0	204	989	20.6	8	

Rules for classification: 1) points; 2) percentage; 3) number of points for.
(P) Premiers

=== Finals ===
2024 VAFA Women's Premier Grand Final
Sunday, 22 September (2:30pm)	St Kevin's	def. by	Old Scotch	Elsternwick Park
0.1 (1); 2.1 (13); 4.2 (26); 5.2 (32)	Q1; Q2; Q3; Final	3.2 (32); 6.2 (38); 8.3 (51); 10.4 (64)	Michael Sholly Medal: Jordan Mifsud (Old Scotch)
K. Stanton 3, S. Cameron 2	Goals	J. Mifsud 4, E. Defina 2, S. Fortunato, M. Kendall, M. Wilson, J. Wise
K. Stanton, A. Embelton, E. Condon, S. Betts, J. Joyce, L. Suleiman	Best	J. Mifsud, B. Gray, M. Caffry, M. Wilson, K. Hunter-Scott, E. Crump

== Premier B ==
2024 Premier B Women's season
- Date: 13 April − 1 September 2024
- Teams: 8
- Premiers: Old Geelong; 1st Premier B premiership
- Minor premiers: Williamstown CYMS
- Best and fairest: Brooke Mckay (Old Geelong − 28 votes)
- Leading goalkicker: Matilda Arthur (Old Geelong − 38 goals)

Old Geelong won the Premier B premiership for the first time, defeating Fitzroy by seven points in the grand final. It was Old Geelong's first-ever senior VAFAW premiership.

Williamstown CYMS achieved a perfect home-and-away season to finish as minor premiers, but lost both the semi-final and the preliminary final to miss the grand final.

=== Ladder ===
Pos	Team	Pld	W	L	D	PF	PA	PP	Pts	Qualification
1	Williamstown CYMS	16	16	0	0	825	262	314.9	64	Finals series
2	Old Geelong (P)	16	13	3	0	833	329	253.2	52	Finals series
3	Fitzroy	16	11	5	0	671	251	267.3	44	Finals series
4	St Bedes/Mentone Tigers	16	9	7	0	697	511	136.4	36	Finals series
5	Beaumaris	16	6	10	0	576	644	89.4	24	
6	Westbourne Grammarians	16	5	11	0	440	538	81.8	20	
7	Aquinas	16	4	12	0	242	899	26.9	16	
8	Old Xaverians (Note: Under the VAFA's regrading policy, a team that is being regraded to a higher section will retain their points for and points against totals from the matches played prior to the regrading, but a team that is regraded to a lower section will have all their points for and points against totals from the matches played prior to the regarding removed.)	16	3	13	0	408	971	42.0	12	

Rules for classification: 1) points; 2) percentage; 3) number of points for.
(P) Premiers

=== Finals ===
2024 VAFA Women's Premier B Grand Final
Sunday, 1 September (2:10pm)	Old Geelong	def.	Fitzroy	Elsternwick Park
0.1 (1); 4.2 (26); 4.2 (26); 5.6 (36)	Q1; Q2; Q3; Final	2.1 (13); 2.2 (14); 4.5 (29); 4.5 (29)	Best on ground: Sophia Rothfield (Old Geelong)
S. McCarthy, M. Passon, C. Cody, M. Arthur, S. Rothfield	Goals	N. Cooney-Hunt 3, E. Boles
A. Latimer, M. Passon, C. Cody, B. Mckay, S. Rothfield, K. Dunn	Best	O. Brilliant, S. Mooney, N. Cooney-Hunt, M. De Bondt, L. Atkinson, S. Lynas

== Division 1 ==
2024 Division 1 Women's season
- Date: 13 April – 1 September 2024
- Teams: 8
- Premiers: Old Brighton; 1st Division 1 premiership
- Runners-up: Marcellin
- Minor premiers: Old Brighton
- Best and fairest: Alana Pane (Marcellin – 27 votes)
- Leading goalkicker: Zoe Glascott (Marcellin – 62 goals)

Old Brighton won the Division 1 premiership for the first time, defeating Marcellin by 21 points in the grand final. It was Old Brighton's first-ever senior VAFAW premiership.

Brunswick and the combined Old Camberwell/AJAX team both left Division 1 after round 4 following regrading. The clubs entered Division 3 and Division 2 respectively.

=== Ladder ===
Old Haileybury forfeited its round 13 match against Parkdale Vultures.

Pos	Team	Pld	W	WF	D	L	PF	PA	%	Pts	Qualification
1	Old Brighton (P)	16	15	0	0	1	1139	235	484.7	60	Finals series
2	Marcellin	16	14	0	0	2	992	251	395.2	56	Finals series
3	Parkdale Vultures	16	7	1	0	8	665	525	126.7	32	Finals series
4	Collegians	16	6	0	0	10	522	984	53.0	24	Finals series
5	Old Melburnians	16	5	0	0	11	435	682	63.8	20	
6	Old Haileybury	16	4	0	0	12	476	772	61.7	16	
–	Old Camberwell/AJAX	4	1	0	0	3	57	361	15.8	4	Regraded to Division 2
–	Brunswick	4	0	0	0	4	33	256	12.9	0	Regraded to Division 3

Rules for classification: 1) points; 2) percentage; 3) number of points for.
(P) Premiers

=== Finals ===
2024 VAFA Women's Division 1 Grand Final
Sunday, 1 September (2:10pm)	Old Brighton	def.	Marcellin	Box Hill City Oval
0.0 (0); 3.3 (21); 4.4 (28); 5.9 (39)	Q1; Q2; Q3; Final	1.0 (6); 1.3 (9); 1.6 (12); 2.6 (18)	Best on ground: Alana Pane (Marcellin)
C. O'Brien 2, I. Tait 2, L. Mitchell	Goals	Z. Glascott 2
C. O'Brien, I. Tait, J. Tait, S. Hodgkinson, C. Hodgson, C. George	Best	A. Pane, H. Harley, B. Harvey, L. Robertson, Z. Glascott, O. Frost

== Division 2 ==
2024 Division 2 Women's season
- Date: 13 April − 22 September 2024
- Teams: 10
- Premiers: Glen Eira; 1st Division 2 premiership
- Minor premiers: Glen Eira
- Best and fairest: Clare Fernandes (Whitefriars − 36 votes)
- Leading goalkicker: Maegan Miller (Hampton Rovers − 22 goals)

Glen Eira won the Division 2 premiership for the first time, defeating Hampton Rovers by 55 points in the grand final.

=== Ladder ===
Old Trinity forfeited its round 12 match against Hampton Rovers and its round 15 match against Power House.

Pos	Team	Pld	W	WF	L	D	PF	PA	PP	Pts	Qualification
1	Glen Eira (P)	16	15	0	1	0	701	185	378.9	60	Finals series
2	Whitefriars	16	12	0	4	0	610	337	181.0	48	Finals series
3	Power House	16	10	1	4	1	703	245	286.9	46	Finals series
4	Hampton Rovers	16	10	1	4	1	673	343	196.2	46	Finals series
5	Oakleigh	16	11	0	5	0	445	279	159.5	44	
6	Richmond Central	16	6	0	10	0	404	377	107.2	24	
7	Old Trinity	16	6	0	10	0	265	545	48.62	24	
8	Hawthorn	16	4	0	12	0	319	612	52.1	16	
9	Mazenod	16	3	0	13	0	148	364	40.7	12	
10	Old Camberwell/AJAX	12	0	0	12	0	71	471	54.2	0	

Rules for classification: 1) points; 2) percentage; 3) number of points for.
(P) Premiers

=== Finals ===
2024 VAFA Women's Division 2 Grand Final
Sunday, 1 September (9:20am)	Glen Eira	def.	Hampton Rovers	Elsternwick Park
1.2 (8); 3.5 (23); 4.8 (32); 9.11 (65)	Q1; Q2; Q3; Final	0.2 (2); 0.3 (3); 1.4 (10); 1.4 (10)
E. Morrison 3, A. Whittle, C. McIntosh, C. Hart, E. Medland, E. Williams, S. Wilson	Goals	A. Graham
E. Morrison, A. Whittle, J. Pavlou, S. Fitzpatrick, C. McIntosh, C. Hart	Best	I. Tucker, P. Daniel-Reid, B. Kavanagh, B. Arnold, C. Politarhis, H. Gould

== Division 3 ==
2024 Division 3 Women's season
- Date: 13 April − 1 September 2024
- Teams: 10
- Premiers: Therry Penola; 1st Division 3 premiership
- Minor premiers: Therry Penola
- Best and fairest: Eliza German (Therry Penola − 43 votes)
- Leading goalkicker: Abbey Duggan (Therry Penola − 44 goals)

Therry Penola won the Division 3 premiership for the first time, defeating La Trobe University by 36 points in the grand final.

=== Ladder ===
Pos	Team	Pld	W	L	D	PF	PA	PP	Pts	Qualification
1	Therry Penola (P)	16	15	1	0	1078	189	570.4	60	Finals series
2	La Trobe University	16	11	5	0	555	355	156.3	44	Finals series
3	De La Salle	16	10	6	0	491	363	135.3	40	Finals series
4	Box Hill North	16	10	6	0	404	316	127.9	40	Finals series
5	Old Carey	16	9	7	0	463	515	89.9	36	
6	UHS-VU	16	7	9	0	309	349	88.5	28	
7	Parkside	16	7	9	0	374	452	82.7	28	
8	Wattle Park	16	4	12	0	266	641	41.5	16	
9	Preston Bullants	16	4	12	0	281	780	36.0	16	
10	Brunswick	12	3	9	0	204	371	57.5	12	

Rules for classification: 1) points; 2) percentage; 3) number of points for.
(P) Premiers

=== Finals ===
2024 VAFA Women's Division 3 Grand Final
Sunday, 1 September (2:55pm)	Therry Penola	def.	La Trobe University	Waverley Oval, Malvern East
0.3 (3); 2.4 (16); 7.7 (49); 7.8 (50)	Q1; Q2; Q3; Final	0.0 (0); 0.2 (2); 0.2 (2); 1.8 (14)
A. Duggan 3, E. German 3, R. O'Halloran	Goals	J. Yew
G. Macgregor, E. German, A. Duggan, R. O'Halloran, E. Pullen, M. Halton	Best	J. Lowry, I. Warrillow, K. Bond, E. Lauritsen, C. Croome, T. D'Angelo

== Division 4 ==
2024 Division 4 Women's season
- Date: 13 April − 8 September 2024
- Teams: 11
- Premiers: St Kevin's; 1st Division 4 premiership
- Minor premiers: St Kevin's
- Best and fairest: Johannah Griffin (Albert Park − 24 votes)
- Leading goalkicker: Jade Wulkan (MCC − 36 goals)

St Kevin's won the Division 4 premiership for the first time, defeating MCC by one point in the grand final.

=== Ladder ===
St Kevin's forfeited its round 6 game against MCC. MCC forfeited its round 13 match against St Kevin's. Old Yarra Cobras forfeited its round 7 match against MCC and its round 10 match against Canterbury.

Pos	Team	Pld	W	WF	L	D	PF	PA	PP	Pts	Qualification
1	St Kevin's (P)	15	12	1	2	0	532	190	280.0	52	Finals series
2	MCC	16	9	2	5	0	620	101	613.9	44	Finals series
3	Albert Park	14	9	0	5	0	433	255	169.8	36	Finals series
4	Kew	15	9	0	6	0	393	339	115.9	36	Finals series
5	North Brunswick	15	7	0	8	0	526	222	236.9	28	Finals series
6	St Mary's Salesian	15	6	0	9	0	390	310	125.8	24	
7	South Melbourne Districts	15	5	0	10	0	178	588	30.3	20	
8	Canterbury	14	3	1	10	0	256	429	59.7	16	
9	Old Yarra Cobras	15	4	0	9	0	278	528	52.7	16	
10	Elsternwick	15	3	0	12	0	311	544	57.2	12	
11	West Brunswick	15	2	0	13	0	131	970	13.5	8	

Rules for classification: 1) points; 2) percentage; 3) number of points for.
(P) Premiers

=== Finals ===
2024 VAFA Women's Division 4 Grand Final
Sunday, 8 September (2:10pm)	St Kevin's	def.	MCC	Elsternwick Park
1.3 (9); 1.3 (9); 2.5 (17); 2.5 (17)	Q1; Q2; Q3; Final	1.0 (6); 1.1 (7); 2.2 (14); 2.4 (16)
L. Barnes, J. Mounas	Goals	H. Brodribb, A. Harris
P. Edwards, C. Lupson, L. Leckey, E. Baczyk, J. Mounas, L. Barnes	Best	A. Stranger, I. Jeffrey, H. Brodribb, G. Cockman, A. Harris, D. Sandys

== See also ==
- 2024 VAFA season
