= Tim Powell =

Tim Powell may refer to:

- Tim Powell (footballer)
- Tim Powell (producer)
