= Paul Groves =

Paul Groves may refer to:

- Paul Groves (Australian coach) (born 1982), Australian rules football coach
- Paul Groves (footballer) (born 1966), English footballer
- Paul Groves (poet) (born 1947), British poet and critic
- Paul Groves (rugby league) (born 1965), English rugby player
- Paul Groves (tenor) (born 1964), American opera singer
