= 2017 VAFA Women's season =

1st season of the VAFA Women's competition

- Teams: 40

The 2017 VAFA Women's season was the inaugural season of the VAFA Women's (VAFAW) competition. 40 teams competed across five divisions, and unlike the VAFA men's competition, there was no promotion and relegation system.

Brunswick, Fitzroy, Melbourne University and St Kevin's all entered two teams each.

== Background ==
In July 2016, the Victorian Amateur Football Association (VAFA) announced they would launch a women's competition beginning in 2017, having considered a launch in 2016 before ultimately delaying the start date.

Seven clubs with pre-existing men's VAFA teams — AJAX, Brunswick, Fitzroy, Kew, La Trobe University, Melbourne University and St Kevin's — already had their own women's teams competing in the Victorian Women's Football League (VWFL). At the end of the 2016 season, it was announced that the VWFL would be dissolved, with the competition's 47 clubs and 60 teams to join community leagues (including the VAFA Women's) in 2017.

== Premier ==
2017 VAFAW Premier season
- Teams: 8
- Premiers: Marcellin; 1st premiership
- Minor premiers: St Kevin's; 1st minor premiership
- Wooden spooners: Melbourne University; 1st wooden spoon

=== Ladder ===
Pos	Team	Pld	W	L	D	PF	PA	PP	Pts	Qualification
1	St Kevin's	14	13	1	0	742	148	501.4	52	Finals series
2	Fitzroy	14	12	2	0	479	202	237.1	48	Finals series
3	Marcellin (P)	14	10	4	0	404	334	121.0	40	Finals series
4	Old Trinity	14	9	5	0	404	303	133.3	36	Finals series
5	Caulfield Grammarians	14	8	6	0	309	466	66.3	32	
6	Brunswick	14	5	9	0	233	364	64.0	20	
7	Old Xaverians	14	5	9	0	218	439	49.7	20	
8	Melbourne University	14	3	11	0	114	647	17.6	12	

Rules for classification: 1) points; 2) percentage; 3) number of points for.
(P) Premiers

=== Finals ===
	Grand Final
Sunday, 20 August (2:10pm)	St Kevin's 2.8 (20)	def. by	Marcellin 3.9 (27)	Elsternwick Park

== Division 1 ==
2017 VAFAW Division 1 season
- Teams: 8
- Premiers: St Mary's Salesian; 1st premiership
- Minor premiers: West Brunswick; 1st minor premiership
- Wooden spooners: Ormond; 1st wooden spoon

=== Ladder ===
Pos	Team	Pld	W	L	D	PF	PA	PP	Pts	Qualification
1	West Brunswick	14	11	3	0	479	235	203.8	44	Finals series
2	St Mary's Salesian (P)	14	11	3	0	487	285	170.9	44	Finals series
3	Old Haileyburians	14	9	5	0	435	394	110.4	36	Finals series
4	Beaumaris	14	8	6	0	439	356	123.3	32	Finals series
5	Old Geelong	14	8	6	0	315	306	102.9	32	
6	Old Brighton	14	8	6	0	292	397	73.5	32	
7	Monash Blues	14	4	10	0	251	429	58.5	16	
8	Ormond	14	3	11	0	289	585	49.4	12	

Rules for classification: 1) points; 2) percentage; 3) number of points for.
(P) Premiers

=== Finals ===
	Grand Final
Sunday, 20 August (11:50am)	West Brunswick 3.1 (19)	def. by	St Mary's Salesian 3.2 (20)	Elsternwick Park

== Division 2 ==
2017 VAFAW Division 2 season
- Teams: 8
- Premiers: Old Camberwell; 1st premiership
- Minor premiers: Old Camberwell; 1st minor premiership
- Wooden spooners: Yarra Old Grammarians; 1st wooden spoon

=== Ladder ===
Yarra Old Grammarians forfeited their match against Oakleigh on 15 July.

Pos	Team	Pld	W	WF	L	D	PF	PA	PP	Pts	Qualification
1	Old Camberwell (P)	14	12	0	2	0	696	176	395.5	48	Finals series
2	Collegians	14	9	0	5	0	416	229	181.7	36	Finals series
3	Old Carey	14	8	0	6	0	401	336	119.4	32	Finals series
4	Ivanhoe	14	8	0	6	0	324	274	118.3	32	Finals series
5	UHS-VU	14	7	0	7	0	426	396	107.6	28	
6	Oakleigh	13	5	1	8	0	367	453	81.0	24	
7	SBMT/St Peters	14	5	0	9	0	254	475	53.5	20	
8	Yarra Old Grammarians	13	2	0	11	0	134	724	18.5	8	

Rules for classification: 1) points; 2) percentage; 3) number of points for.
(P) Premiers

=== Finals ===
	Grand Final
Saturday, 19 August (2:00pm)	Old Camberwell 5.7 (37)	def.	Old Carey 2.4 (16)	Trevor Barker Beach Oval

== Division 3 ==
2017 VAFAW Division 3 season
- Teams: 6
- Premiers: Mazenod; 1st premiership
- Minor premiers: AJAX; 1st minor premiership
- Wooden spooners: Therry Penola; 1st wooden spoon

=== Ladder ===
Pos	Team	Pld	W	L	D	PF	PA	PP	Pts	Qualification
1	AJAX	14	9	5	0	487	141	345.4	36	Finals series
2	Mazenod (P)	14	8	6	0	356	291	122.3	32	Finals series
3	Old Mentonians	14	6	8	0	408	297	137.4	24	Finals series
4	Hampton Rovers	14	6	8	0	199	264	75.4	24	Finals series
5	Melbourne University	14	5	9	0	308	501	61.5	20	
6	Therry Penola	14	2	12	0	239	503	47.5	8	

Rules for classification: 1) points; 2) percentage; 3) number of points for.
(P) Premiers

=== Finals ===
	Grand Final
Sunday, 20 August (9:30am)	Mazenod 3.6 (24)	def.	Old Mentonians 3.4 (22)	Elsternwick Park

== Division 4 ==
2017 VAFAW Division 4 season
- Teams: 8
- Premiers: Hawthorn; 1st premiership
- Minor premiers: Hawthorn; 1st minor premiership
- Wooden spooners: Brunswick; 1st wooden spoon

=== Ladder ===
Pos	Team	Pld	W	L	D	PF	PA	PP	Pts	Qualification
1	Hawthorn (P)	14	9	4	1	482	180	267.8	38	Finals series
2	South Melbourne Districts	14	8	3	3	315	194	162.4	38	Finals series
3	St Kevin's	14	8	4	2	545	143	381.1	36	Finals series
4	Swinburne University	14	8	5	1	481	188	255.9	34	Finals series
5	De La Salle	14	8	5	1	309	199	155.3	34	
6	Canterbury	14	5	9	0	348	335	103.9	20	
7	St Mary's Salesian	14	5	9	0	221	423	52.3	20	
8	Bulleen Templestowe	14	2	12	0	168	319	52.7	8	
9	Fitzroy	14	2	12	0	104	488	21.3	8	
10	Brunswick	14	1	13	0	50	554	9.0	4	

Rules for classification: 1) points; 2) percentage; 3) number of points for.
(P) Premiers

=== Finals ===
	Grand Final
Saturday, 19 August (11:40am)	Hawthorn 4.7 (31)	def.	St Kevin's 2.2 (14)	Trevor Barker Beach Oval

== See also ==
- 2017 VAFA season
