= Preston Football Club (disambiguation) =

The Preston Football Club (nicknamed the Bullants) is a Victorian Football League club in Australia.

Preston Football Club may also refer to:

- Preston Bullants Amateur Football Club, Australia
- Preston Lions FC, Australia
- West Preston Lakeside Football Club, Australia
- Preston North End F.C., an English football club located in Preston, Lancashire, formed in 1863
- East Preston F.C., English club
- Preston Athletic F.C., Scottish club
