= Simon Meehan =

Australian rules footballer (born 1961)

Personal information
- Full name: Simon H. Meehan
- Born: 20 September 1961 (age 65)
- Original team: St Kilda CBC
- Height: 180 cm (5 ft 11 in)
- Weight: 73 kg (161 lb)

Playing career^{1}
| Years | Club | Games (Goals) |
| 1980–1984 | St Kilda | 55 (69) |
- ^{1} Playing statistics correct to the end of 1984.

Simon Meehan (born 20 September 1961) is a former Australian rules footballer who played with St Kilda in the Victorian Football League (VFL).

A rover, Meehan was recruited locally, from St Kilda CBC. He played 55 league games for St Kilda and kicked 69 goals, from 1980 to 1984.

Meehan then played with West Torrens in the South Australian National Football League, before going to Victorian Football Association club Frankston.

He coached Old Haileyburians to two Victorian Amateur Football Association premierships, in 1989 (C Grade) and 1990 (B Grade).

In the 1993 Ovens & Murray Football League season, Meehan was coach of the Wodonga Raiders.
