= Merrington =

Merrington may refer to

- Merrington, Shropshire, a village in England
- Kirk Merrington, a village in County Durham, England
- Merrington (surname)
