= Nick Mitchell (footballer) =

Australian rules footballer (born 1973)

Personal information
- Full name: Nick Mitchell
- Born: 1 February 1973 (age 53)
- Original team: St Bernard's Football Club
- Height: 180 cm (5 ft 11 in)
- Weight: 79 kg (174 lb)

Playing career^{1}
Years	Club	Games (Goals)
1994–1995	Fitzroy	9 (2)
- ^{1} Playing statistics correct to the end of 1995.

Nick Mitchell (born 1 February 1973) is a former Australian rules footballer who played with Fitzroy in the Australian Football League (AFL).

Mitchell, a left-footer, was recruited from St. Bernard's. He played five games in the 1994 AFL season and four games in the 1995 season.
