= Dave Bland =

Australian rules footballer (1929–2013)

Personal information
- Full name: David Bland
- Born: 10 November 1929
- Died: 9 March 2013 (aged 83)
- Original team: Hampton Rovers
- Height: 192 cm (6 ft 4 in)
- Weight: 98 kg (216 lb)

Playing career
Years	Club	Games (Goals)
1951–1955	St Kilda	36 (25)

Representative team honours
Years	Team	Games (Goals)
1956	South Australia	1 (0)

Career highlights
- 1955 Grosvenor Trophy; 1955 St Kilda best and fairest third place; 1956 Perth Carnival representative

David Bland (10 November 1929 – 9 March 2013) was an Australian rules footballer who played with St Kilda in the Victorian Football League (VFL). He played 36 league games for St Kilda, over five seasons. During that time he missed 14 games through suspension, 12 of them for two incidents in the 1953 VFL season.

== St Kilda ==
Bland, a ruckman, came to St Kilda in 1951 and put in some good performances with the seconds. He joined the club from the Hampton Rovers in the VAFA and had trained the year before with Victorian Football Association (VFA) club Sandringham. His league debut came in round 10, against South Melbourne at Junction Oval and he remained in the side for a further three rounds, before he was forced out of the side with injury.

In the 1952 VFL season, Bland made 12 appearances for St Kilda, all in succession from rounds 4 to 15. St Kilda finished the season in last position, with just two wins, but Bland had become a required player and the club refused an application from Carlton to interview him during the 1953 pre-season.

Bland had an interrupted season in 1953, which he began well when he kicked two goals in his second appearance, a win over Hawthorn in round two. An injured knee in training kept him out of the team for two weeks, then he was recalled into the side to play Carlton at Princes Park, a game that would be remembered for a third quarter brawl that Bland helped cause. Following a marking contest in a forward pocket, Carlton's Jack Howell had handpassed to a teammate, after which he was felled by Bland. The brawl, which went on for close to five minutes, involved almost all of the players as well as several spectators. Mounted police had to take to the field and were eventually able to calm the situation. Bland was found by the tribunal to have "deliberately struck Howell in the groin" with his knee and received a four-week suspension. After his suspension ended, Bland was required to build up match practice in the St Kilda seconds and didn't return to the seniors until round 12, against North Melbourne at Arden Street Oval. On his comeback appearance, Bland would once more find himself on report, this time charged with "kicking" North Melbourne player Laurie Icke. Bland, who had been reported by three umpires for the incident, was suspended for eight weeks. This brought an end to a season of only four appearances.

With the suspension keeping him out the first two rounds of the 1954 VFL season, Bland returned in round three against Collingwood and kicked a career high three goals. He ended up playing nine games that season. A knee injury he sustained in the Collingwood game caused him to miss some early games and he also struggled when St Kilda used him as a full-forward at times during the year.

In 1955, Bland had his best season for St Kilda, despite making limited appearances. A groin injury and broken finger ended his season in round 10. He played just seven league games, but polled eight Brownlow Medal votes, the only time in his career that he featured in the count. His efforts during the season were enough to win the Grosvenor Trophy, an award for St Kilda's best player, voted on by the club's past players and officials. He also finished third in the St Kilda best and fairest award. The season wasn't without incident for Bland, in round two he was cited for throwing the ball into the face of Essendon's Doug Bigelow, which the tribunal deemed to have been intentional and suspended him for two weeks.

Bland considered a switch to rugby league during the year, when it looked like he would have to transfer to Sydney for his work. He was set to have a trial with the St. George Dragons, but circumstances changed and the following year he moved to Adelaide.

== SANFL ==
With Bland relocating to Adelaide at the end of the 1955 season, to set up a blueprint business, this generated interest from South Australian National Football League (SANFL) clubs keen to secure his services. Initially, St Kilda refused to grant him a clearance and offered to fly him over from Adelaide to play each weekend, but Bland was reluctant to spend too much time away from his business. It wasn't until mid May that St Kilda agreed to clear Bland, to South Adelaide.

In June, after only three SANFL appearances, Bland was selected in the South Australian team to play in the Perth Carnival, as a second ruckman and forward pocket. He played in South Australia's opening fixture against the VFA and during the game sprained his knee, which ruled him out for the rest of the carnival.

Bland played 12 games for South Adelaide in two seasons, with injuries again restricting his appearances.

In 1962 he played two league games with Norwood.
