= Ross Booth =

Australian rules footballer and commentator (1952–2024)

- Booth in 1987

Personal information
- Full name: Ross Booth
- Born: 19 March 1952; Melbourne, Victoria, Australia
- Died: 3 June 2024 (aged 72); Toorak, Victoria, Australia

Playing career
Years	Club	Games (Goals)
1971−76	Monash Blues	
1977−83	University Blacks	
Total		100+

Career highlights
- 2x Monash Blues best-and-fairest (1973, 1974); Monash Blues captain (1973, 1974); Monash Blues team of the half century (1962−2011)

Ross Booth (19 March 1952 – 3 June 2024) was an Australian rules footballer and commentator.

== Career ==
=== VAFA ===
Booth started his playing career at the Monash Blues Football Club in the Victorian Amateur Football Association (VAFA), beginning in 1971.

He captained the Blues and was the club's best-and-fairest winner in 1973 and 1974, and later came in second place in the VAFA A Section best-and-fairest in 1976.

In 1977, Booth left the Monash Blues and joined the University Blacks, where he continued his playing career until the end of 1983. By the time of his retirement, he had played more than 100 games.

Booth was appointed a VAFA Executive/Board Member in 1986, serving in the role until 2010. He was awarded VAFA life membership in 2003, and was named in the Monash Blues' team of the half century in 2011.

=== VFA/VFL commentary ===
At the end of the 1987 VAFA season, Booth left his role at The Amateur Footballer and joined the Australian Broadcasting Corporation (ABC) as a commentator for the second-tier Victorian Football Association (VFA) competition.

He continued commentating when the VFA was renamed to the Victorian Football League (VFL) in 1996, working alongside other prominent names including Phil Cleary (who had played for Coburg Amateurs against Booth in the early 1970s).

In addition to broadcast commentary, Booth was part of the VFA coverage in The Sunday Age.

== Death ==
On 5 June 2024, Phil Cleary announced Booth's death in a Facebook post, stating he died in his apartment in Toorak. He was 72.

VAFA president Paul Newton described it as a "sad day for the Association," and the VFL described Booth as a "much loved and highly respected figure in the football industry".

At the time of his death, Booth was a senior lecturer in the department of economics at Monash University.
