= Northern Blues (disambiguation) =

Northern Blues may refer to

- Preston Football Club, an Australian rules football club based in Preston that was formerly known as the Northern Blues
- Preston Bullants, an amateur Australian rules football club also formerly known as the Northern Blues
- Northern Blues (album), an album by Kristofer Åström
- Plebejus idas, a butterfly commonly known as the northern blue
