= Barry Cameron =

Australian rules footballer

Personal information
- Full name: Barry Cameron
- Born: 6 June 1939 (age 87)
- Original team: Hampton Scouts
- Height: 184 cm (6 ft 0 in)
- Weight: 87 kg (192 lb)
- Position: Follower

Playing career^{1}
Years	Club	Games (Goals)
1959–1966	Richmond	96 (21)
- ^{1} Playing statistics correct to the end of 1966.

Barry Cameron (born 6 June 1939) is a former Australian rules footballer who played for the Richmond Football Club in the Victorian Football League (VFL).
