= Gary Merrington =

Australian rules footballer (1946–2024)

Personal information
- Nickname: Chooka
- Born: 19 November 1946
- Died: 10 December 2024 (aged 78)
- Original team: Sunshine YCW / Braybrook
- Height: 187 cm (6 ft 2 in)
- Weight: 85 kg (187 lb)
- Positions: Wing/Key defender and occasionally in forward

Playing career^{1}
Years	Club	Games (Goals)
1966–1975	Footscray	174 (46)
- ^{1} Playing statistics correct to the end of 1975.

Career highlights
- Member of the Western Bulldogs' '67 and '70 Night Premierships Kicked 4 goals against the Hawks in a game in 1973 (after kicking 2.6 the week before) Life member of the Western Bulldogs Football Club.

Gary Merrington (19 November 1946 – 10 December 2024) was an Australian rules footballer who played with Footscray in the Victorian Football League (VFL).

Merrington was recruited locally, from Footscray District Football League club Braybrook, and also played on the alternate day for Sunshine YCW.

He played as a defender for most of his career, but also spent some time on the wing.

Merrington was a member of Footscray's 1967 and 1970 night premierships, kicking 5 goals in the 1967 final.

After retiring he continued serving the club as a recruiter and was their Football Manager during the 1990s.

He had two sons, Andrew Merrington, who played for Carlton and Adam who played in the Victorian Amateur Football Association for Old Essendon Grammarians.

Merrington died on the night of 10 December 2024, at the age of 78.

Overall, Merrington is remembered as a pioneer Bulldog who could play any position excellently (such as hauls of goals when he was moved up forward occasionally) and a recruiter who recruited excellent players such as Chris Grant and Leon Cameron. Merrington was a life member of the Bulldogs, and was a passionate supporter of the club for many years after he retired. He also volunteered as a publican at the All Nations Hotel in Richmond, where customers enjoyed eating lunch and talking with him.
