= Andrew Merrington =

Australian rules footballer, born 1978

Personal information
- Full name: Andrew Merrington
- Born: 27 November 1978 (age 47)
- Original team: Calder Cannons / St Bernard's Football Club
- Height: 192 cm (6 ft 4 in)
- Weight: 95 kg (209 lb)

Playing career^{1}
Years	Club	Games (Goals)
2000–2003	Carlton	18 (11)
- ^{1} Playing statistics correct to the end of 2003.

Andrew Merrington (born 27 November 1978) is an Australian rules footballer.

Merrington played TAC Cup football for the Calder Cannons, but was not immediately drafted and went to play for St Bernard's Old Collegians in the VAFA. Following a year at St Bernard's, he was recruited to the AFL by the Carlton Football Club in the 1999 National Draft, Merrington was considered a future key position/ruckman prospect. However he only played 18 games with the Blues until the end of the 2003 season, where he was delisted after spending much time with either the Carlton reserves team or the Northern Bullants in the VFL, rather than the senior Carlton team.

After being delisted he was recruited by East Perth in the WAFL. He immediately cemented himself a place in the side usually playing centre half forward, and was rewarded with state selection for Western Australia in his first year. Merrington won the 2005 F.D. Book Medal for being the club's best and fairest player, and became a vice captain in 2006.

Merrington left East Perth at the end of 2010. He returned to his former amateur side, St Bernard's, in 2011.

He is the son of former Footscray player Gary Merrington.
