= Paul Groves (Australian coach) =

Australian rules football coach

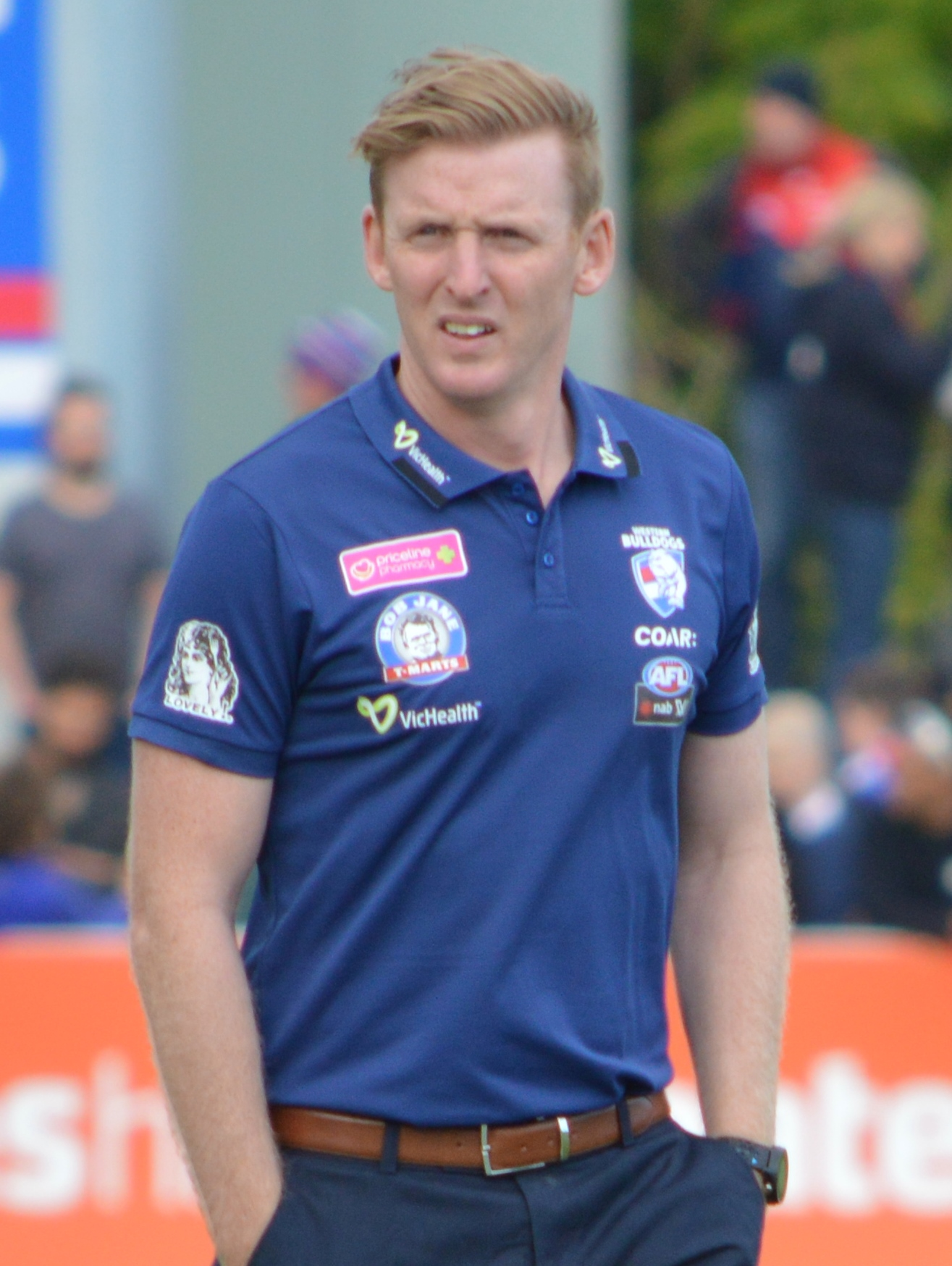
- Groves in February 2017

Personal information
- Full name: Paul Groves
- Born: 1982 (age 43–44)

Coaching career^{3}
Years	Club	Games (W–L–D)
2017–2019	Western Bulldogs (W)	22 (10–12–0)
- ^{3} Coaching statistics correct as of 2019.

Career highlights
- AFL Women's premiership coach: 2018

Paul Groves is a former Australian rules football coach who served as the head coach of the Western Bulldogs in the AFL Women's competition (AFLW) between 2017 and 2019 including to the club's first AFLW premiership in 2018.

== Coaching career ==
=== Early days ===
After playing amateur football at St Bedes/Mentone under future Western Bulldogs premiership coach Luke Beveridge between 2006 and 2008, Groves himself took up coaching football for the first time.

Groves first started coaching the women's game in 2011, when he assisted the AFL Victoria youth girls development team at the national championships that year. In 2013 he went on to become the head coach of the national championship winning Victorian Metropolitan girls side.

At the same time Groves worked in assistant roles in the youth boys game at the Sandringham Dragons before filling a similar position at the Calder Cannons in 2014.

In 2015 and 2016 he worked as the head coach of the Monash Blues in the Victorian Amateur Football Association.

He has also worked as the director of sport at Salesian College between 2010 and 2016. And is now the head of sport At St Bernards College

=== AFL Women's ===
Groves was appointed as the inaugural head coach of the Western Bulldogs's AFL Women's side in June 2016.

He coached the side to two wins from seven matches in the league's inaugural season in 2017.

In June 2019 he stepped aside from coaching in order to pursue a teaching job.

== Coaching statistics ==
Legend
W	Wins	L	Losses	D	Draws	W%	Winning percentage	LP	Ladder position	LT	League teams

Season	Team	Games	W	L	D	W %	LP	LT
2017	Western Bulldogs	7	2	5	0	29%	6	8
2018^{#}	Western Bulldogs	8	6	2	0	75%	1	8
2019	Western Bulldogs	7	2	5	0	29%	5 (conf.)	5 (conf.)
Career totals		22	10	12	0	45%		
