= St Bernard's Football Club =

Names
- Full name: St Bernard's Old Collegians Football Club Inc
- Nickname: Snowdogs

2025 season
- Home-and-away season: 7th

Club details
- Founded: 1963; 62 years ago
- Colours: Gold Black Blue
- Competition: VAFA: Premier Division WFNL: Juniors (boys and girls)
- President: Steve Perrett
- Coach: Steven Alessio
- Premierships: VAFA (10): 1963; 1964; 1975; 1984; 1987; 1991; 2002; 2015; 2018; 2023
- Ground: St Bernard's College Oval

Uniforms
Home

Other information
- Official website: stbernardsfc.com.au

The St Bernard's Football Club (officially known as the St Bernard's Old Collegians), nicknamed the Snowdogs, is an Australian rules football club based in the Melbourne suburb of Essendon West. The club is closely associated with its namesake, St Bernard's College, and plays its home matches at the school's oval.

Since 1971, St Bernard's has been one of only two Victorian Amateur Football Association (VAFA) clubs to have not been relegated below B Section/Premier B after reaching the top division for the first time (the other being Old Scotch).

As of 2025, St Bernard's competes in the Premier Division of the VAFA men's competition. It is the only Premier Division club without a senior women's team, although there are junior girls teams competing in the Western Football Netball League (WFNL).

== History ==
After St Bernard's College fielded a strong premiership side in the 1961 Associated Catholic Colleges (ACC) First XVIII competition, a senior club was formed in 1963 (composed largely of players from the 1961 team). The newly-formed St Bernard's Football Club entered the VAFA's E Section, becoming the first club in VAFA history to win a senior premiership in their inaugural season after defeating Glen Huntly by 20 points in the grand final. The club went back-to-back with a D Section premiership victory over Old Brighton in 1964.

St Bernard's gained promotion to B Section for the first time in 1969, followed by promotion to A Section the following season. The club made four consecutive finals series between 1973 and 1976, including winning the 1975 A Section grand final. The remainder of the 20th century saw the club alternate between A Section and B Section, winning three B Section flags in 1984, 1987 and 1991.

The club faced Old Xaverians in three A Section grand finals in four seasons between 2000 and 2003, winning the 2002 grand final. Under the leadership of senior coach Anthony Rock, the club won a third top division premiership in 2015 and saw the drafting of two players to the AFL, Mitch Hannan and Ben Ronke.

Throughout its history, St Bernard's College has maintained ties to the Essendon Football Club that have also been reflected in the football club, with former Essendon premiership ruckman Steven Alessio serving as the coach of St Bernard's senior team since the 2023 season.

== Club symbols ==
The club is nicknamed the "Snowdogs" because its namesake college's patron saint is also named for the alpine dog breed, the St. Bernard. The club brandishes gold and black on their guernseys and wear blue shorts, and have done so since the club was formed.

== Honours ==
=== Premierships ===
Competition	Division	Wins	Years won
Victorian Amateur Football Association	Premier A	3	1975, 2002, 2015
Victorian Amateur Football Association	Premier B	5	1984, 1987, 1991, 2018, 2023
Victorian Amateur Football Association	Division 1	1	1964
Victorian Amateur Football Association	Division 2	1	1963

== VFL/AFL players ==
- Nick Mitchell
- Andrew Merrington
- Mitch Hannan
- Jake Riccardi
- Lachlan Sholl
- Xavier O'Halloran
- Lachlan Gollant
- Ben Ronke
- Tom Liberatore
- Mitch Wallis
- Luke Mitchell
