= Tim Powell (footballer) =

Australian rules footballer

Personal information
- Full name: Tim Powell
- Born: 14 April 1968 (age 58)
- Original team: Berrigan/Assumption College
- Height: 183 cm (6 ft 0 in)
- Weight: 80 kg (176 lb)
- Position: Half forward/back

Playing career^{1}
Years	Club	Games (Goals)
1988–1992	Richmond	64 (40)
1993–1994	Carlton	11 (10)
Total		75 (50)
- ^{1} Playing statistics correct to the end of 1994.

Tim Powell (born 14 April 1968) is a former Australian rules footballer who played with Richmond and Carlton in the Australian Football League (AFL).

Powell, originally from Berrigan, was used up forward and on the half back flanks while at Richmond. He kicked 17 goals in 1989 and early the following season had two 'Best on ground' performances which were later awarded acknowledged in the Brownlow Medal count.

Before the 1993 season he was traded to Carlton for pick 28 in the draft and in his first year at his new club lined on the half forward flank in their 1993 Grand Final loss to Essendon.
