= AJAX Football Club =

Names
- Full name: AJAX Football Club
- Nickname(s): Men's: Jackas; Women's: Jackettes

2024 season
- After finals: VAFA: 4th VAFAW: N/A
- Home-and-away season: VAFA: 3rd VAFAW: 10th
- Leading goalkicker: VAFA: Richie Simon (62); VAFAW: Romy Klooger (2)
- Best and fairest: VAFA: Jordan Cohen; VAFAW: Romy Klooger

Club details
- Founded: 30 January 1957; 69 years ago
- Colours: Red White Black
- Competition: VAFA: Premier B VAFAW: Division 2
- Ground: Gary Smorgon Oval

Uniforms
Home

Other information
- Official website: ajaxfootballclub.com.au

The AJAX Football Club (Associated Judaean Athletic Clubs), nicknamed the Jackas, is an Australian rules football club based in the Melbourne suburb of St Kilda.

AJAX was formed by the local Jewish community in 1957, becoming Australia's first and only fully Jewish club competing in the sport of Australian rules football.

As of 2025, the club's men's team competes in the Premier B division of the Victorian Amateur Football Association (VAFA), while its women's team is in Division 2 of the VAFA Women's (VAFAW). An affiliated junior team, the AJAX Junior Football Club, fields teams in the South Metro Junior Football League (SMJFL).

== History ==
In 1955, football enthusiast Daryl Cohen proposed the formation of a new club composed of Jewish people. After several months of discussions, the Associated Judaean Athletic Clubs (AJAX) was formally established in January 1957 and admitted into the VAFA the same year.

AJAX adopted the red, white and black colours of the St Kilda Football Club, which also donated a set of jumpers for AJAX players. The Christian cross in the St Kilda logo was replaced by a Star of David. The club won its first premiership in E Section in 1966.

In 1975, AJAX made the E Section grand final against Elsternwick. However, the date of the grand final clashed with Rosh Hashanah (Jewish new year) and, after the VAFA refused to change the date of the game, AJAX forfeited the grand final. The VAFA ultimately reversed their decision and moved the grand final to 13 September 1975, with AJAX going on to win the E Section premiership. Following this, the VAFA agreed to move any games that fell on a Jewish High Holiday to a more suitable date at the club's request.

AJAX introduced a women's team in 2015, entering Division 5 East in the Victorian Women's Football League (VWFL). When the VWFL was disbanded, the club moved to the VAFA Women's (VAFAW) and fielded a team in the competition's inaugural season in 2017.

Former Australian Football League (AFL) player and coach Mark Williams joined AJAX in 2016 to serve as its senior men's coach, starting in 2017. He served as coach for a total of two seasons, departing at the end of 2018 after the club finished second-last in Premier B and was consequently relegated to Premier C.

Antisemitic graffiti was spray-painted on AJAX's clubrooms in July 2021. The incident was condemned by the VAFA as an "abhorrent and unlawful racial attack", and the Beaumaris Football Club would later be awarded with a Medal of Courage from the Anti-Defamation Commission for its stance against antisemitism and racism.

In 2024, AJAX combined its women's side with Old Camberwell in order for both clubs to continue competing. The combined side originally played in Division 1 but it was moved to Division 2 after round 4, following three heavy losses.
