= Hampton Rovers Football Club =

Australian Rules Football club in Melbourne, Australia

- Full name: Hampton Rovers Amateur Football Club
- Nickname: Rovers
- Sport: Australian Rules Football
- Founded: 1929
- First season: 1933
- League: VAFA
- Division: Premier C
- Home ground: Boss James Reserve
- Colours: Green and Gold
- Anthem: "Beside the Seaside"
- President: Gary Nash
- Chairman: Stephen Anderson
- Head coach: Anthony Quon
- Captain: Christian Carnovale

The Hampton Rovers Amateur Football Club was founded in 1929 and is located in Melbourne, Australia. The club competes in the Victorian Amateur Football Association and the South Metro Junior Football League and has both men's and women's teams.

Hampton Rovers has won a total of over 60 premierships in its existence, which includes nine senior VAFA premierships counting an A Section flag in 1951. The club had a total of 33 teams in 2019 including five senior teams, 28 junior teams and an Auskick program, with over 800 players. The Rovers last won consecutive senior Premierships in 2013 and 2014, gaining promotion to Premier B Section for the 2015 VAFA season, however has since been relegated and will compete in Premier C in 2020.

Senior Premierships - 1939 (D), 1946 (C), 1947 (B), 1951 (A), 1995 (D), 1998 (C), 2001 (C), 2013 (D1), 2014 (C).

== Club history ==
Hampton Rovers began as an organised activity for the 1st Hampton Scout group in 1918. The Scout Group's main aim was to promote football as a team game and encourage self-confidence, self-control and the desire of a player to improve his ability.

Initially, games were played socially against other Scout Groups, but as the incentive to play in a higher standard became apparent, another competition was sought.

In 1931, Hampton Rovers was admitted to the Metropolitan Football League and played Richmond United at Burnley in its first game.

In 1933 the club joined the Victorian Amateur Football Association and changed the colours to the current Green & Gold.

The club has won a total of 9 senior premierships including an A Section flag in 1951. Added to this are 9 reserve and 9 under 19 premierships.

1963 saw the club move from Ludstone Street to their present home, Cnr David Street and Bluff Road. From humble beginnings the players, committee and loyal supporters have nurtured Hampton Rovers over many years and assisted in creating the facilities the club enjoys today. In 2002 this ground was formally named Boss James Reserve in memory of its founder.

In 1979 the club started its youth policy by introducing Junior Grades. The aims were to provide an extensive link with the local community and a development scheme and feeder base for the senior sides. The club now fields 28 junior teams in the South Metro Junior Football League, with over 600 boys and girls.

The club hosted the first VAFA Women's match in 2017, under lights at Boss James Reserve, and in 2019, fielded seven female teams, including five junior girls, U18's and senior women's.

Hampton Rovers has maintained an honest and hard-working approach to its administration and has a deeply etched tradition, not only with the Victorian Amateur Football Association and the South Metro Junior Football League, but with the community at large. The club also maintains a high profile with the local media.

The club celebrated its 90th year in 2019, is in a healthy position and well placed for a successful next decade as it builds towards its centenary.

== AFL Players ==
- Dave Bland - St Kilda)
- Barry Cameron - Richmond
- Graham Cooper - Hawthorn
- Allan Davis - St Kilda, Melbourne, Essendon, Collingwood
- Chris Dawes - Collingwood, Melbourne
- Danny Hughes - Melbourne, Adelaide
- Peter Lucas - Collingwood
- Ted Richards - Essendon, Sydney
- Ross Smith - St Kilda
- Karl Amon - Port Adelaide
- Andrew Brayshaw - Fremantle
- Angus Brayshaw - Melbourne
- Hamish Brayshaw - West Coast
- Miles Bergman - Port Adelaide
- Jayden Hunt - Melbourne
- Brayden Maynard - Collingwood
- Corey Maynard- Melbourne Demons
- Harry Reynolds - Sydney
- Christian Salem - Melbourne
- Will Walker - North Melbourne
- Archie Roberts- Essendon
