= Yallourn Football Club =

Football club in Victoria, Australia

Yallourn Football Club was an Australian Rules Football Club based in Yallourn, Victoria, which ran from 1921 to 1976.

== History ==
Yallourn Football Club

The first documented football match that Yallourn FC was involved in was a practice match against Morwell in 1921.

In 1922, Yallourn were admitted into the Central Gippsland Football Association. Reg Anthony was elected as captain.

Between 1937 and 1940 Yallourn entered two teams into the Central Gippsland Football Association, under the names of Yallourn Blue and Yallourn Gold, with Yallourn Blue winning the 1939 Central Gippsland Football Association premiership.

In 1947, Yallourn had two sides in the Central Gippsland Football League Seconds competition, Yallourn and Yallourn Youths.

Yallourn FC and Yallourn North FC merged in 1977 to form the Yallourn Yallourn North FC.

Yallourn North Football Club

The Yallourn North FC commenced playing in 1948 in the Mid Gippsland Football League after the Brown Coal Mine Imperials and Brown Coal Mine Rovers teams merged and changed their name to the Yallourn North FC.

Yallourn FC and Yallourn North FC's merged in 1977 to form Yallourn Yallourn North FC, who played in the Mid Gippsland Football League up until 2019. In 2021 YYNFC joined the Gippsland Football League.

Premierships

- Mid Gippsland Football League
  - 1950 1963, 1972.

Yallourn Imperials Football Club

The Yallourn Imperials Football Club first competed in the Morwell & Yallourn Football Association in 1932. The “Imps” eventually folded just prior to the 1940 season, due to many players enlisting in the Army.

Football Timeline

- Morwell & Yallourn Football Association
  - 1932 to 1934
- Mid Gippsland Football League
  - 1935 to 1939

== Football Timeline ==
- 1922 to 1931: Central Gippsland Football Association
- 1932 to 1935: Gippsland Football League
- 1936 to 1940: Central Gippsland Football Association
- 1941 to 1943: Club to recess due to World War Two
- 1944 to 1945: Central Gippsland Wartime Football League
- 1946 to 1953: Central Gippsland Football League

== Yallourn FC Premierships ==
- Central Gippsland Football League
  - 1925, 1926, 1928, 1931, 1936, 1939, 1948
- Gippsland Football League
  - 1932, 1933
- Central Gippsland Wartime Football League
  - 1944
- Victory Day Lightening Premiership
  - 1946

== VFL Players ==
The following footballers played with Yallourn FC prior to playing VFL football

- 1928 - Bill Churchill - South Melbourne
- 1933 - Jack Sambell - Melbourne
- 1938 - Fred Godfrey - Footscray
- 1939 - Bill Green - Essendon
- 1940 - Ken Williams - Collingwood
- 1943 - Stan Attenborough - North Melbourne
- 1944 - Doug Williams - Carlton
- 1945 - Don Benson - Richmond
- 1946 - George Card - Geelong
- 1947 - Syd Tate - Geelong
- 1948 - Geoff Collins - Melbourne
- 1949 - Jim Shaw - Melbourne
- 1953 - Lloyd Brewer - Richmond
- 1955 - John Paice - Carlton
- 1956 - Peter Cook - Melbourne
- 1957 - John Hutchinson - Fitzroy
- 1963 - Tom Garland - Richmond
- 1964 - Garry Crane - Carlton
- 1967 - Gavin Smith - Fitzroy
- 1971 - Colin Dell - Footscray
- 1978 - Steve Emery - Hawthorn
- 1991 - Scott Lee - Adelaide

The following footballers played/coached with Yallourn FC after playing senior VFL football, with the year indicating their first season at Yallourn.

- 1926 - Jim Lawn - Collingwood
- 1930 - Vince Irwin - Essendon
- 1946 - Frank Kelly - Collingwood
- 1949 - Ted Hill - Collingwood
- 1950 - Les Jones - Richmond
- 1951 - Reg Baker - Collingwood
- 1959? - Vic Lawrence - North Melbourne
- 1964 - Mike Collins - Melbourne
