= List of Gippsland Football League best and fairest winners =

The Gippsland Football League (GFL) is an Australian rules football competition played in Gippsland, Victoria, Australia.

== History ==
The Gippsland Football League was formed when the Northern Gippsland Football Association (NGFA) officially changed their name to "The Gippsland Football League" in 1921.

The R. Frank Jensen Trophy, was initially awarded to the best and fairest player in the Gippsland Football League in 1927 and was named after the donor. Then T. Victor Trood donated the award from 1928 onwards. Trood, originally from Sale, was a former VFL player with University former Sale FC footballer and Sale FC delegate, who went onto become the GFL President (1933 & 1936 to 1938) and a life member.

The Rodda Medal was initially awarded to the best and fairest winner in the Central Gippsland Football Association in 1936, after Morwell player, Fred Rodda suffered fatal injuries in a match in 1936.

In 1944 and 1945, there was a Central Gippsland Wartime Football League and the Rex Hartley Memorial Medal was first presented to the best and fairest player. This competition only went for two years and this award continued on with Central Gippsland FL Reserves competition from 1946 to 1953. The Gippsland FL then continued this Reserves award from 1954 to present day.

Both the Trood Award and the Rodda Medal were continued on in the newly formed La Trobe Valley Football League in 1954, as the senior football best and fairest trophy, after the Central Gippsland Football League folded, when seven clubs joined the new La Trobe Valley Football League.

25 of the winners below, played senior VFL / AFL football either before or after winning this most prestigious football award.

The following list represents the best and fairest winners in all grades of football since 1927.

== Best and Fairest Lists ==
Trood Award / Rodda Medal

Year	Seniors (Trood Award/Rodda Medal)	Reserves (Rex Hartley Medal)	Under 18's (Bruce Wilkinson Medal)	Under 16's (Shaw/Carter Medal)
	Gippsland FL: Trood Award			
1927	Bennie Lunn (Rosedale) (7 Votes) &			
	Tom Standing (Traralgon) (7)			
1928	Tom Standing (Traralgon) (?)			
1929	Tom Standing (Traralgon) (?)			
1930	Tom Standing (Traralgon) (?)			
1931	Jack Jemmeson (Bairnsdale) (3&1/2)			
1932	Sam Barrett (Maffra) (5)			
1933	Maurie "Mop" Gibb (Rosedale) (7)			
1934	Paul Cameron (Rosedale) (4)			
1935	Arthur Davidson (Sale) (4) &			
	Jeff Tudor (Yarram) (4)			
1936	Jack Collins (Sale ) (3) &			
	W "Bill" Flynn (Bairnsdale ) (3)			
1937	Jeff Tudor (Yarram) (3)			
	J Halstead (Bairnsdale) (3)			
1938	T Price (Yarram ) (?)			
1939	W Stone (Bairnsdale) (21)			
1940-45	GFL in recess. WWI			
1944	Central Gippsland Wartime FL >	Dick King (Traralgon) ()		
1945	Central Gippsland Wartime FL >	L. Handley (Yarragon) (?) &		
		C. O'Bryan (Mirboo) (?)		
1946	Leo Brennan (Sale Greens) (?)			
	David Higgins (The Wanderers) (?)			
	T. Dusty L'Estrange (Maffra Blacks) (?)			
	P. Digger L'Estrange (Maffra Blacks) (?)			
1947	Bruce "Joey" Morrison (Bairnsdale) (15)			
1948	Jim Shingles (Maffra) (12)			
1949	Ian Farley (Stratford) (17)			
1950	Des Calvert (Bairnsdale) (22)			
1951	A. Jack E. Spriggs (Bairnsdale) (18)			
1952	Bob Mason (Sale) (19)			
1953	Max Nixon (Orbost) (16)			
	LaTrobe Valley FL:Trood Award/Rodda Medal			
1954	Bob Mason (Sale) (20)	Rex Donnelly (Moe) (19)		
1955	Bob Mason (Sale) (23)	Ron Hayes (Warragul) (20)		
1956	Noel Alford (Traralgon) (18)	"Mossy" Morgan (Trafalgar) (33)		
1957	John Nix (Sale) (21)	"Mossy" Morgan (Trafalgar) (16)	M.James (Morwell) (19)	
1958	Lester Ross (Moe) (31)	Tom Hart (Sale) (33)	M.West (Warragul) (14)	
1959	Peter Bevilacqua (Yarragon) (19)	Ray Pollock (Yallourn)	N.Hall (Yallourn) (12)	
1960	Steve Szabo (Morwell) (20)	Alan Rankin (Trafalgar) (20)	G.Townsend (St Pat's) (22)	
1961	Kevin Coverdale (Bairnsdale) (24)	Jack Vinall (Yallourn) (20)	G.Townsend (St Pat's) (31)	
1962	Ric Belford (Yallourn) (27)	Tom O'Callaghan (Traralgon) (18)	T.Hunter (Traralgon) (29)	
1963	Allan Steele (Moe) (18)	Ron Serong (Warragul) (32)	R.Foster (St Pat's A) (35)	WEST ZONE (Under 18's)
	Don Keyter (Moe) (23)*ineligible			
1964	Mike Collins (Yallourn) (17)	Max Prendergast (Bairnsdale) (27)	J.Barnett (Sale) (23)	B.Pickering (Trar. Colts) (12)
1965	Steve Szabo (Morwell) (26)	Richard Evans (Maffra) (20)	J.Barnett (Sale) (25)	P.Lerstang (Traraglon Colts) (23)
1966	Terry Hunter (Traralgon) (15)	Les Roberts (Sale) (21)	G.Fletcher (St Pat's) (20)	C.Luxford (Morwell) (18)
1967	George Brayshaw (Traralgon) (15)	Les Roberts (Sale) (12)	D.Scott (Heyfield) (23)	Robert Baldry (Warragul) (12)
1968	Les Hawken (Trafalgar) (31)	Peter Rodaughan (Moe) (28)	J.Welsh (St Pat's) (30)	E.Gray (Trar. Colts) (25)
1969	John Gallus (Bairnsdale) (37)	Barry Taylor (Yallourn) (14)	P.Speed (Sale) (22)	M.Mancuso (Traralgon) (11)
1970	John Gallus (Maffra) (30)	Lyle Berry (Heyfield) (18)	A.Gallagher (St Pat's) (27)	G.McFarlane (Morwell) (13)
1971	Terry Benton (Leongatha) (20)	Graeme Anderson (Heyfield) (18)	I.Stanley (Traralgon) (19)	P.Shields (Moe) (15)
1972	Henro Kornacki (Morwell) (27)	Barry Taylor (Yallourn) (13)	T.Munro (Traralgon) (23)	L.Ponton (Trar. Colts) (18)
1973	Barry Rowlings (Moe) (35)	Jack Vardy (Maffra) (21)	A.Williams (Traralgon) (19)	C.Carr (Morwell) (18)
1974	Barry Rowlings (Moe) (28)	Gus Eaton (Moe) (20)	J.Buntine (Sale) (24)	S.McNamara (Leongatha) (15)
1975	John Gallus (Warragul) (28)	Peter Pacunskis (Traralgon) (15)	P.Boyce (Moe) (20)	
1976	Ray Christie (Bairnsdale) (19)	Jack Vardy (Maffra) (17)	J.Morrison (St Pat's) (25)	
1977	Peter Hall (Traralgon) (14)	Jack Vardy (Maffra) (14)	C.Dowd (Leongatha)	
1978	Jeff Mogel (Morwell) (22)	John Kimberley (Yallourn) (18)	W.McInnes (Yallourn) (25)	
1979	Jeff Gieschen (Maffra) (22)	Allan Light (Warragul) (24)	A.Morrison (Warragul) (24)	
1980	Ian Salmon (Leongatha) (24)	Jeff Swenson (Newborough) (24)	Ron Copeland (Morwell)	
1981	Ray Mildenhall (Yallourn/YNth) (24)	Jock Eason (Moe) (15)	Mark Trewella (Warragul) (27)	
1982	Jeff Gieschen (Maffra) (27)	Kasey Plemper (Moe) (17)	G.Scott (Bairnsdale) (27)	
	David Vogel (Morwell) (27)			
1983	Ray Mildenhall (Yallourn/YNth) (24)	Greg Roughead (Leongatha) (27)	C.Dilettoso (Maffra) (33)	
1984	Peter Hall (Traralgon) (27)	Gary House (TTU) (17)	Graeme Rankin (Warragul) (22)	
1985	Rod Kerr (Morwell) (30)	Ray DeCarli Yall./YN 20	D Thompson Traralgon / TU 40	
1986	Jim Silvestro (Traralgon) (26)	Darren Slocumb Morwell 12 &	Lachlan Sim Moe 27	
		Garry Kerr Morwell 12		
1987	Jim Silvestro (Traralgon) (19)	Kevin Mealing Traralgon 14	Greg Morley Traralgon 30	
1988	Lachlan Sim (Moe) (27)	Ken Fleming, Leongatha, 17	G Stewart Bairnsdale 23	
1989	Peter Geddes (Maffra) (20)			
1990	John McDonald (Traralgon) (15); Peter Helms (Leongatha) (15)			Andrew Blencowe, (Maffra), (28)
1991	Chris Grumley (Maffra) (22)			
1992	Greg Morley (Traralgon) (16)			
1993	Anthony Gravener (Maffra) (14)			
1994	Andrew Pratt (Warragul) (19)			
1995	Darren Read (Leongatha) (25)			
1996	David Mills (Warragul) (16)			
1997	Neil Robertson (Traralgon) (17)			
1998	Greg Morley (Traralgon) (21)			
1999	Chris Day (Wonthaggi) (20)			
2000	Jason Shields (Moe) (17)			Michael Geary Traralgon 29
2001	Hayden Burgiel (Maffra) (31)			
2002	Adam Mabilia (Wonthaggi) (20); Gary Jones (Maffra) (20)			
2003	Greg Morley (Traralgon) (17)			
2004	Hayden Burgiel (Maffra) (28)			
2005	Andrew Soumilas (Garfield) (23)			
2006	Desi Barr (Warragul) (26)			
2007	Nick Hider (Maffra) (23)			
2008	Nick Hider (Maffra) (24)			
2009	Adrian Cox (Sale) (14); Michael Geary (Traralgon) (14)			
2010	Gary Jones (Maffra) (26)			
2011	Andrew Soumilas (Drouin) (25)			
2012	Luke Collins (Sale) (23)			
2013	Kelvin Porter (Maffra) (20)		Jye Read (Wonthaggi)	
2014	Adam Bailey (Morwell ) (20)			
2015	Bob McCallum (Drouin) (23)			
2016	Brad Scalzo (Warrugal) (21)	Nicholas Tucker, Wonthaggi, 13	Hudson Holmes, Maffra, 24	Ben McKinnon, Bairnsdale, 26
2017	James Blaser (Moe) (21)	Chris Rump, Leongatha, 17	Matthew Williams, Traralgon, 22	Sam Berry, Maffra, 21
	Kane Martin (Sale) (21)			
	Jack Blair (Wonthaggi) (21)			
2018	Tom Marriott (Leongatha) (32)	James Heslop, Moe 18	Ewan Williams, Traralgon, 18	Luis D'Angelo, Traralgon, 28
2019	Jack Lipman (Sale) (20)	Jake Bishop (Traralgon) (15)	Thomas Bradshaw (Maffra) (25)	Vinnie Caia (Warrugal) (34)
2020	GFL in recess. COVID-19			

== Rodda Medal ==
Central Gippsland Football League (1909 to 1953)
Senior & Reserves Football Best and Fairest Awards

The Central Gippsland Football Association was initially formed in 1909 from the following club's - Bunyip, Drouin, Moe, Morwell, Thorpedale, Trafalgar, Traralgon and Yarragon.

A gold medal was first awarded in 1932, when the Elder-Berwick medal was presented to the CGFL best and fairest player. Mr. George Elder-Berwick was a Morwell FC Delegate and later a CGFL President in 1934 who donated the gold medal.

The Rodda Medal was initially awarded to the best and fairest winner in the Central Gippsland Football Association in 1936, after Morwell player, Fred Rodda suffered fatal injuries in a match in 1936.

In 1944 and 1945, there was a Central Gippsland Wartime Football League and the Rex Hartley Memorial Medal was first presented to the best and fairest player. Hartley was a former Moe FC player. This competition only went for two years and this award continued on with Gippsland FL Reserves competition from 1946 onwards.

Both the Trood Award and the Rodda Medal were continued on in the newly formed La Trobe Valley Football League in 1954, as the senior football best and fairest trophy, along with the Rex Hartley (Reserves) Medal after the Central Gippsland Football League folded, when seven clubs joined the new La Trobe Valley Football League.

10 of the medal winners below, played senior VFL / AFL football either before or after winning this most prestigious football award.

Year	1sts Premiers	Seniors B & F	Club	Votes	2nds Premiers	Reserves B & F	Club	Votes
1909	Bunyip							
1910	Iona							
1911	Trafalgar							
1912	Bunyip							
1913	Trafalgar							
1914	Iona							
1915	Bunyip							
1916	CGFA in recess. WWI							
1917	CGFA in recess. WWI							
1918	CGFA in recess. WWI							
1919	Iona							
1920	Iona							
1921	Yarragon							
1922	Warragul							
1923	Trafalgar							
1924	Nar Nar Goon							
1925	Yallourn							
1926	Yallourn							
1927	Warragul							
1928	Yallourn							
1929	Nar Nar Goon / Iona							
1930	Nar Nar Goon / Iona							
1931	Yallourn	Elder-Berwick Medal						
1932	Warragul	Harry Andrews	Warrugal	?				
1933	Morwell	Greg Campbell	Morwell	5 & 1/2				
1934	Leongatha	Denis "Dinny" Dowd	Drouin	?				
1935	Morwell	Arthur "Arty" Duncan	Warrugal	?				
		Rodda Medal						
1936	Yallourn	Ivan Williams	Moe	?				
1937	Morwell	Bob Bawden	Morwell	?				
1938	Warragul	Jack Scott	Traralgon	?				
1939	Yallourn Blues	A "Bert" Tabuteau	Moe	?				
1940	Leongatha	Les Handley	Yarragon	5				
1941		CGFL in recess.WWI						
1942		CGFL in recess.WWI				Rex Hartley Medal		
1943		CGFL in recess.WWI				Central Gippsland Wartime FL		
1944		CGFL in recess.WWI			Yallourn	Dick King	Traralgon	?
1945		CGFL in recess.WWI			Moe	L Handley &	Yarragon	?
						C. O'Bryan	Mirboo	?
						Central Gippsland FL: Reserves		
1946	Traralgon	Bob Flanigan	Morwell	?	Warragul	John Nix	Trafalgar	?
1947	Traralgon	R Jones	Yarragon	5 & 1/2	Warragul	?		
1948	Yallourn	F Bateman &	Leongatha	4	Yallourn	Noel Moller	Traralgon	5
		Jack Collins	Traralgon	4				
1949	Traralgon	W "Bill" Snell	Mirboo North	5	Morwell	Noel Moller &	Traralgon	4
						Jack Young	Thorpedale	4
1950	Morwell	Frank O'Leary &	Korumburra	5	Morwell*	J Hunt	Yallourn	?
		Clarrie Swenson	Trafalgar	5				
1951	Leongatha	Noel Ross	Mirboo North	25 & 1/2	Warragul	Ralph Shalless	Morwell	25
1952	Morwell	Eric Moore	Trafalgar	18	Traralgon v Warragul	Ralph Shalless	Morwell	20
1953	Morwell	Jim Shaw	Yallourn	20	Warragul	Ralph Shalless	Morwell	?

== Notes ==
- - 1950: Morwell Reserves were undefeated in 1950.
