= Horrie Farmer =

Horrie Farmer may refer to one of two father and son Australian rules footballers:

- Horrie Farmer (footballer, born 1888) (1888–1934), Victorian Football League player for St Kilda
- Horrie Farmer (footballer, born 1909), Victorian Football League player for Richmond and North Melbourne
