= Ben McKay (footballer) =

Australian rules footballer

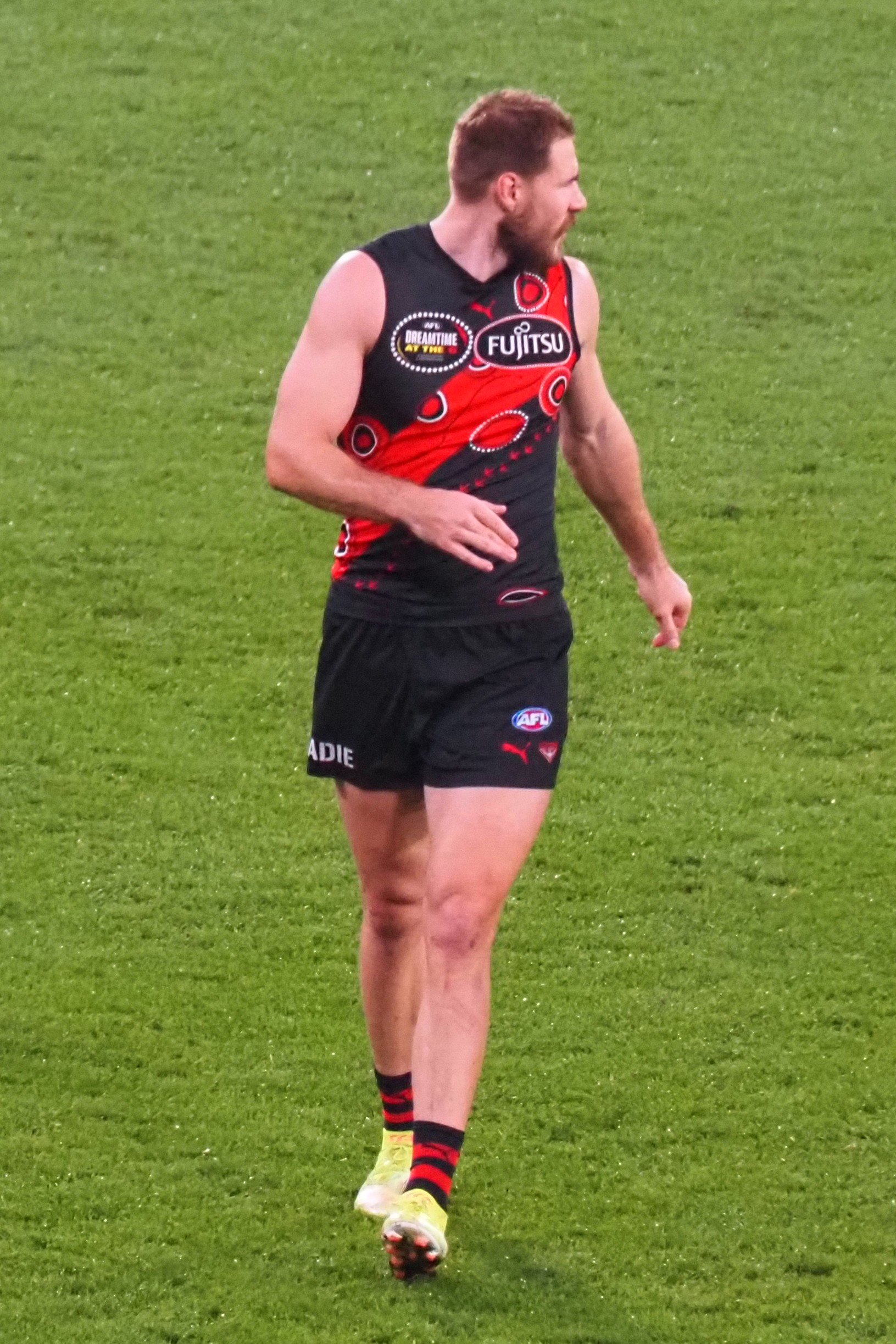
- McKay playing for Essendon in 2025

Personal information
- Full name: Ben McKay
- Born: 24 December 1997 (age 28); Torquay
- Original team: Gippsland Power (TAC Cup)/Warragul
- Draft: No. 21, 2015 national draft
- Debut: Round 23, 2017, North Melbourne vs. Brisbane Lions, at the Gabba
- Height: 202 cm (6 ft 8 in)
- Weight: 104 kg (229 lb)
- Position: Key defender

Club information
- Current club: Essendon
- Number: 32

Playing career^{1}
| Years | Club | Games (Goals) |
| 2016–2023 | North Melbourne | 71 (1) |
| 2024– | Essendon | 48 (6) |
| Total | | 119 (7) |
- ^{1} Playing statistics correct to the end of round 22, 2026.

Ben McKay (born 24 December 1997) is a professional Australian rules footballer playing for the Essendon Football Club in the Australian Football League (AFL). He previously played for North Melbourne after being selected with pick 21 in the 2015 AFL draft.

== Early life ==
McKay grew up in the Victorian town of Warragul in Gippsland. He played local football for Warragul Football Club.

He attended school at St Paul's Anglican Grammar.

Growing up he supported Essendon, the club he would later end up playing for.

== AFL career ==
He was drafted by North Melbourne with their first selection and twenty-first overall in the 2015 national draft. He made his debut in the fifty-one point win against the Brisbane Lions at the Gabba in round twenty-three of the 2017 season. In February 2019, Ben signed a two-year contract extension keeping him at the Kangaroos until at least the end of 2021.

Taking time to develop, Ben McKay found consistency at AFL level, playing 11 games in the backline in the 2020 season.

McKay moved to Essendon as a restricted free agent in October 2023.

== Family ==
He is the identical twin brother of Carlton's Harry McKay. In round 13 of the 2024 season, they played against each other for the first time in their careers. Before this game, they had never played one another, despite having been in the league for seven years; often as a result of one of the two being suspended or withdrawn late with injury – leading to internet jokes that they are the same player running a fake twin gambit. Ben (and Harry) are also cousins with former Port Adelaide and North Melbourne player, Stuart Cochrane. Cochrane's mother's maiden name is McKay.

== Statistics ==
Updated to the end of round 22, 2026.

Legend
| G | Goals | K | Kicks | D | Disposals | T | Tackles |
| B | Behinds | H | Handballs | M | Marks | H/O | Hit-outs |

| Season | Team | No. | Games | Totals | | | | | | | | Averages (per game) | | | | | | | | Votes |
| Season | Team | No. | Games | G | B | K | H | D | M | T | H/O | G | B | K | H | D | M | T | H/O | Votes |
|---|---|---|---|---|---|---|---|---|---|---|---|---|---|---|---|---|---|---|---|---|
| 2016 | North Melbourne | 23 | 0 | — | — | — | — | — | — | — | — | — | — | — | — | — | — | — | — | 0 |
| 2017 | North Melbourne | 23 | 1 | 0 | 0 | 2 | 7 | 9 | 1 | 3 | 3 | 0.0 | 0.0 | 2.0 | 7.0 | 9.0 | 1.0 | 3.0 | 3.0 | 0 |
| 2018 | North Melbourne | 23 | 0 | — | — | — | — | — | — | — | — | — | — | — | — | — | — | — | — | 0 |
| 2019 | North Melbourne | 23 | 3 | 0 | 1 | 11 | 10 | 21 | 10 | 4 | 0 | 0.0 | 0.3 | 3.7 | 3.3 | 7.0 | 3.3 | 1.3 | 0.0 | 0 |
| 2020 (Note: The 2020 season was played with 17 home-and-away matches per team (down from 22) and 16-minute quarters with time on (down from 20-minute quarters with time on) due to the impact of the COVID-19 pandemic.) | North Melbourne | 23 | 11 | 0 | 0 | 43 | 59 | 102 | 36 | 17 | 2 | 0.0 | 0.0 | 3.9 | 5.4 | 9.3 | 3.3 | 1.5 | 0.2 | 0 |
| 2021 | North Melbourne | 23 | 22 | 0 | 0 | 99 | 111 | 210 | 95 | 31 | 0 | 0.0 | 0.0 | 4.5 | 5.0 | 9.5 | 4.3 | 1.4 | 0.0 | 0 |
| 2022 | North Melbourne | 23 | 15 | 1 | 0 | 92 | 47 | 139 | 82 | 11 | 0 | 0.1 | 0.0 | 6.1 | 3.1 | 9.3 | 5.5 | 0.7 | 0.0 | 0 |
| 2023 | North Melbourne | 23 | 19 | 0 | 0 | 146 | 86 | 232 | 113 | 22 | 0 | 0.0 | 0.0 | 7.7 | 4.5 | 12.2 | 5.9 | 1.2 | 0.0 | 0 |
| 2024 | Essendon | 32 | 23 | 0 | 0 | 162 | 141 | 303 | 122 | 32 | 4 | 0.0 | 0.0 | 7.0 | 6.1 | 13.2 | 5.3 | 1.4 | 0.2 | 0 |
| 2025 | Essendon | 32 | 10 | 0 | 0 | 51 | 37 | 88 | 44 | 14 | 0 | 0.0 | 0.0 | 5.1 | 3.7 | 8.8 | 4.4 | 1.4 | 0.0 | 0 |
| 2026 | Essendon | 32 | 15 | 6 | 7 | 79 | 60 | 139 | 70 | 17 | 12 | 0.4 | 0.5 | 5.3 | 4.0 | 9.3 | 4.7 | 1.1 | 0.8 | 0 |
| Career | | | 119 | 7 | 8 | 685 | 558 | 1243 | 573 | 151 | 21 | 0.1 | 0.1 | 5.8 | 4.7 | 10.4 | 4.8 | 1.3 | 0.2 | 0 |
