= Jack Collins (footballer, born 1904) =

Australian rules footballer (1904–1968)

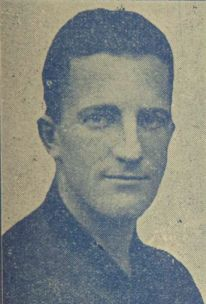

Personal information
- Full name: John Aloysius Collins
- Born: 4 October 1904; Murrumbeena, Victoria
- Died: 25 July 1968 (aged 63); Carrum, Victoria
- Original team: CBC St Kilda
- Height: 179 cm (5 ft 10 in)
- Weight: 73 kg (161 lb)

Playing career^{1}
Years	Club	Games (Goals)
1923–1931	Melbourne	127 (7)
- ^{1} Playing statistics correct to the end of 1931.

John Aloysius Collins (4 October 1904 – 25 July 1968) was an Australian rules footballer who played for the Melbourne Football Club in the Victorian Football League (VFL).

Collins, who was originally from CBC St Kilda, was on a wing for Melbourne in their 1926 premiership team. He represented Victoria B against New South Wales in 1929. His sons, Geoff and Mike, both played for Melbourne.
