= Harry McKay =

Australian rules footballer

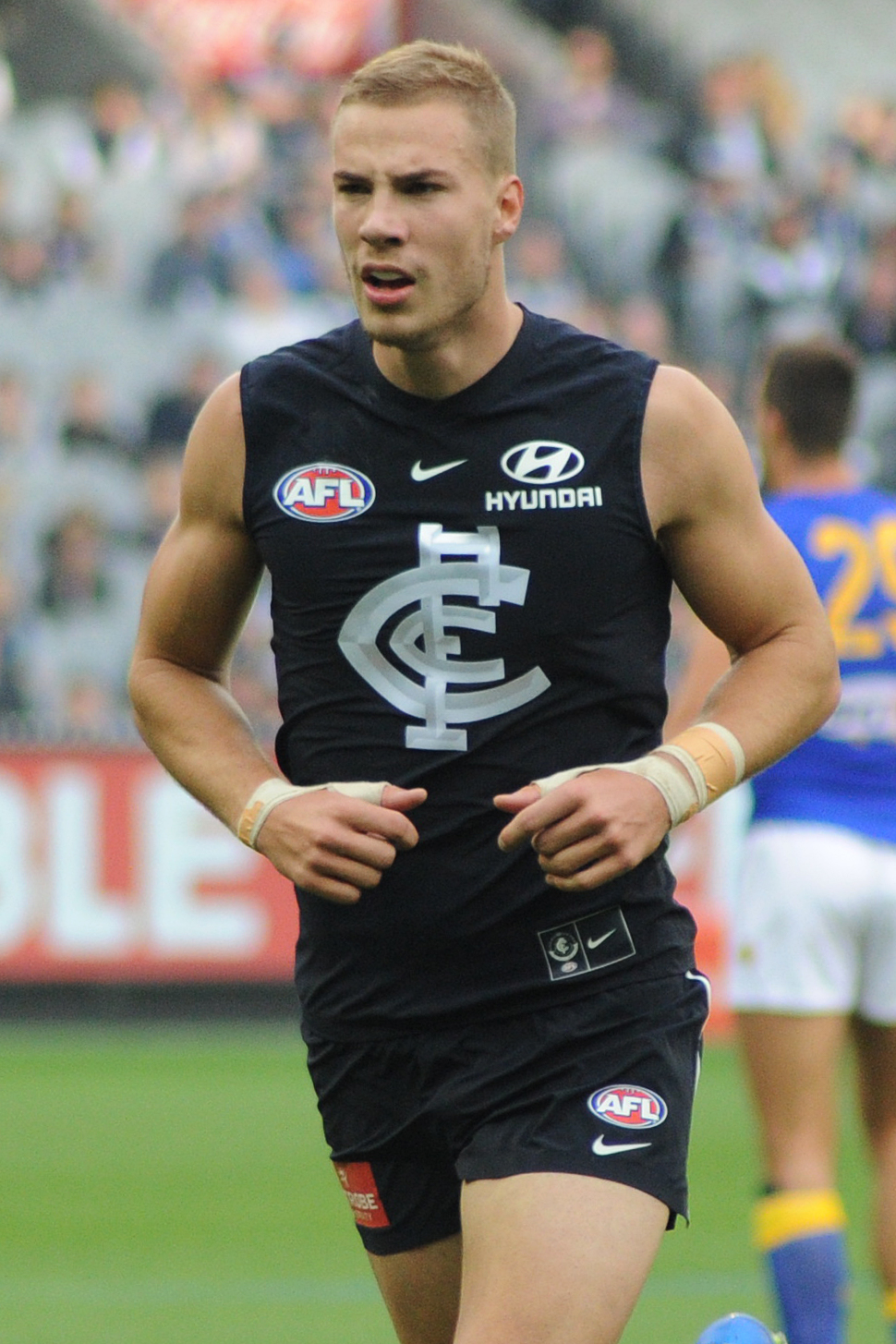
- McKay playing for Carlton in April 2018

Personal information
- Full name: Harrison McKay
- Nicknames: H, Big H, Feathers, Mackie
- Born: 24 December 1997 (age 28); Warragul, Victoria
- Original team: Gippsland Power (TAC Cup)/Warragul Football Club
- Draft: No. 10, 2015 national draft
- Debut: Round 18, 2017, Carlton vs. Brisbane Lions, at the Gabba
- Height: 200 cm (6 ft 7 in)
- Weight: 106 kg (234 lb)
- Position: Key forward

Club information
- Current club: Carlton
- Number: 10

Playing career^{1}
Years	Club	Games (Goals)
2016–	Carlton	163 (309)
- ^{1} Playing statistics correct to the end of the 2026 season.

Career highlights
- Coleman Medal: 2021; All-Australian: 2021; 22under22 team: 2019; 3x Carlton leading goalkicker: 2019, 2020, 2021

Harrison McKay (born 24 December 1997) is a professional Australian rules footballer playing for the Carlton Football Club in the Australian Football League (AFL). In 2021, McKay won the Coleman Medal, awarded to the league's leading goalkicker for the season.

== Career ==
A key forward, McKay played junior football at Warragul and state under-18s football with the Gippsland Power. He was drafted by Carlton with a first-round selection (No. 10 overall) in the 2015 national draft. He missed much of the 2016 season—his first season in the professional system—with stress fractures in his back, and he made his senior debut for the club in Round 18, 2017.

McKay began to command a regular place in the Carlton forward line in 2018, and he was soon the club's primary spearhead. He won his first club leading goalkicker award in 2019 with 26 goals and was named forward pocket in that season's 22under22 team; he then led the club's goalkicking again in the pandemic-shortened 2020 season with 21 goals. He had a breakout season in 2021, serving as a deep full-forward. He was among the strongest contested marks in the league. He kicked 58 goals for the season to be named in the 2021 All-Australian team and winning the Coleman Medal by a four-goal margin. This was both the most goals and first Coleman Medal by a Carlton player since 2009.

A natural left-foot kick, McKay's has gone through phases of both high and low goalkicking accuracy throughout this career. In 2021, he adopted a style of taking his set shots from the right side of the ground with a perpendicular run-up and snap kick, even from relatively narrow angles, while continuing to favour the conventional drop punt from the left side of the ground, and won the Coleman Medal with 58.33; but his proficiency with the snap declined over subsequent years, culminating in a 2023 season tally of 29.29 from 77 attempts (across all kick types) which drew extensive negative coverage. McKay significantly reduced his use of narrow angle snap shots from 2024, finishing that season with a greatly improved return of 49.21.

In Opening Round 2024, McKay kicked the match winner with a minute and a half to go to win the game for the Blues after trailing by 46 points against the Lions at the Gabba.

== Family ==
McKay is the mirror image twin brother of fellow professional footballer Ben McKay, who plays as a key defender at Essendon and previously at North Melbourne. It was not until 2024, their ninth seasons in the league, that they played an AFL game against each other, often as a result of one of the two being suspended or withdrawn late with injury, leading to internet jokes that they were the same player running a fake-twin gambit. The twins grew up in the Victorian town of Warragul and played local football for Warragul Football Club.

== Statistics ==
Updated to the end of the 2026 season.

Legend
G	Goals	K	Kicks	D	Disposals	T	Tackles
B	Behinds	H	Handballs	M	Marks
†	Led the league for the season

Season	Team	No.	Games	Totals							Averages (per game)							Votes
Season	Team	No.	Games	G	B	K	H	D	M	T	G	B	K	H	D	M	T	Votes
2016	Carlton	10	0	—	—	—	—	—	—	—	—	—	—	—	—	—	—	0
2017	Carlton	10	2	3	2	11	4	15	7	1	1.5	1.0	5.5	2.0	7.5	3.5	0.5	0
2018	Carlton	10	13	21	11	103	35	138	70	23	1.6	0.8	7.9	2.7	10.6	5.4	1.8	0
2019	Carlton	10	20	26	30	161	46	207	125	32	1.3	1.5	8.1	2.3	10.4	6.3	1.6	1
2020 (Note: The 2020 season was played with 17 home-and-away matches per team (down from 22) and 16-minute quarters with time on (down from 20-minute quarters with time on) due to the impact of the COVID-19 pandemic.)	Carlton	10	13	21	15	76	21	97	57	20	1.6	1.2	5.8	1.6	7.5	4.4	1.5	2
2021	Carlton	10	19	58^{†}	33	154	31	185	113	27	3.1	1.7	8.1	1.6	9.7	5.9	1.4	8
2022	Carlton	10	19	45	31	169	48	217	114	25	2.4	1.6	8.9	2.5	11.4	6.0	1.3	7
2023	Carlton	10	21	29	29	190	57	247	141	34	1.4	1.4	9.0	2.7	11.8	6.7	1.6	2
2024	Carlton	10	21	49	21	207	67	274	143	52	2.3	1.0	9.9	3.2	13.0	6.8	2.5	6
2025	Carlton	10	12	22	10	111	61	172	75	31	1.8	0.8	9.3	5.1	14.3	6.3	2.6	10
2026	Carlton	10	23	35	27	203	98	301	123	33	1.5	1.2	8.8	4.3	13.1	5.3	1.4	4
Career			163	309	209	1385	468	1853	968	278	1.9	1.3	8.5	2.9	11.4	5.9	1.7	40
