= Horrie Farmer (footballer, born 1909) =

Australian rules footballer (1909–1981)

Personal information
- Full name: Horace Charles Farmer
- Born: 28 August 1909; Prahran, Victoria
- Died: 13 October 1981 (aged 72); Warragul, Victoria
- Original team: Warragul
- Height: 178 cm (5 ft 10 in)
- Weight: 67 kg (148 lb)

Playing career^{1}
Years	Club	Games (Goals)
1933	Richmond	8 (14)
1936–1937	North Melbourne	19 (23)
Total		27 (37)
- ^{1} Playing statistics correct to the end of 1937.

Horace Charles Farmer (28 August 1909 – 13 October 1981) was an Australian rules footballer who played with Richmond and North Melbourne in the Victorian Football League (VFL).

Farmer was a forward and set a club record when he kicked six goals on his VFL debut for Richmond, against North Melbourne at Punt Road Oval in 1933. He played seven more games that year, including the 1933 VFL Grand Final loss to South Melbourne, kicking two of Richmond's four goals.

In 1934 he returned to the country and played for his original club, Warragul.

He began playing for North Melbourne in the 1936 VFL season and appeared in 17 of a possible 18 games. In 1937 he played in the opening two rounds, then returned to Warragul.

His father, also named Horrie, played league football for St Kilda.
