= Arthur Duncan (Australian footballer) =

Australian rules footballer, born 1913

Personal information
- Full name: Arthur Frederick Duncan
- Born: 20 February 1913; Surrey Hills, Victoria
- Died: 25 March 1991 (aged 78); Warragul, Victoria
- Original team: Warragul

Playing career^{1}
Years	Club	Games (Goals)
1936	North Melbourne	3 (1)
- ^{1} Playing statistics correct to the end of 1936.

Arthur Frederick Duncan (20 February 1913 – 25 March 1991) was an Australian rules footballer who played for the North Melbourne Football Club in the Victorian Football League (VFL).

Duncan won the 1935 Central Gippsland Football League best and fairest award, the Elder-Berwick Medal.
