= Charlie Canet =

Australian rules footballer and coach

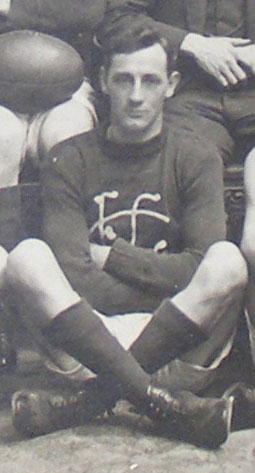
- Canet in 1921

Personal information
- Full name: Charles Canet
- Born: 8 September 1895; Tallygaroopna, Victoria
- Died: 11 February 1978 (aged 82); Macleod, Victoria
- Original team: Brunswick Juniors
- Height: 170 cm (5 ft 7 in)
- Weight: 67 kg (148 lb)
- Position: Wing

Playing career^{1}
Years	Club	Games (Goals)
1916–21	Carlton	80 (5)
- ^{1} Playing statistics correct to the end of 1921.

Charlie Canet (8 September 1895 – 11 February 1978) was an Australian rules footballer who played with Carlton in the Victorian Football League (VFL).

Canet coached Sale to premierships in 1924 and 1927 in the Gippsland Football League.

After successfully coaching Nathalia to the 1923 Goulburn Valley Football Association premiership and Maffra, Sale and Kyabram, Canet was appointed as coach of the Carlton Reserves in 1940.
