= George Hoskins (Australian footballer) =

Australian rules footballer

Personal information
- Full name: George Arthur Henry Hoskins
- Born: 16 October 1916; Warragul, Victoria
- Died: 3 October 1995 (aged 78); Warragul, Victoria
- Original team: Warragul
- Height: 179 cm (5 ft 10 in)
- Weight: 87 kg (192 lb)

Playing career^{1}
Years	Club	Games (Goals)
1942–1947	Fitzroy	72 (1)
- ^{1} Playing statistics correct to the end of 1947.

George Arthur Henry Hoskins (16 October 1916 – 3 October 1995) was an Australian rules footballer who played with Fitzroy in the Victorian Football League (VFL) during the 1940s. He played in the midfield as a centreman.
