= Hec Davidson =

Australian rules footballer, born 1908

Personal information
- Full name: Harold Albert Davidson
- Born: 29 March 1908; Sale, Victoria
- Died: 24 May 1976 (aged 68); Lindenow, Victoria
- Original team: Sale (GFL)
- Position: Rover

Playing career^{1}
Years	Club	Games (Goals)
1930–32	Melbourne	20 (5)
- ^{1} Playing statistics correct to the end of 1932.

Harold Albert "Hec" Davidson (29 March 1908 – 24 May 1976) was an Australian rules footballer who played with Melbourne in the Victorian Football League (VFL).

Originally from Sale Football Club, Davidson also played 37 games with Victorian Football Association (VFA) club Camberwell from 1935 to 1937.

Davidson's brother Arthur played for Hawthorn.
