= Norm Brooker =

Australian rules footballer

Personal information
- Full name: Norman Squire Brooker
- Nickname: Norm
- Born: 28 September 1889; Warragul, Victoria
- Died: 11 December 1976 (aged 87); Kerang, Victoria
- Original team: Warragul (CGFA)
- Height: 182 cm (6 ft 0 in)
- Weight: 85 kg (187 lb)
- Position: Backline

Playing career^{1}
Years	Club	Games (Goals)
1911	Richmond	3 (0)
- ^{1} Playing statistics correct to the end of 1911.

Norman Squire Brooker (28 September 1889 – 11 December 1976) was an Australian rules footballer who played with Richmond in the Victorian Football League (VFL).

Brooker was recruited from Warragul in the Central Gippsland Football Association in 1911 and made his debut in August in Round 16, of his short three consecutive game career at Richmond.

Brooker is number 87 on the list of players to have played for the club.

Brooker served in both World Wars.
