= Les Wallace (footballer) =

Australian rules footballer

Personal information
- Full name: Leslie Zim Wallace
- Born: 22 May 1894; Traralgon, Victoria
- Died: 26 December 1970 (aged 76)
- Original team: Warragul
- Height: 165 cm (5 ft 5 in)
- Positions: Forward, rover

Playing career^{1}
Years	Club	Games (Goals)
1921	Melbourne	1 (0)
- ^{1} Playing statistics correct to the end of 1921.

Leslie Zim Wallace (22 May 1894 – 26 December 1970) was an Australian rules footballer who played with Melbourne in the Victorian Football League (VFL).

Before his football career, he served in World War I. After making a solitary appearance for Melbourne in 1921, Wallace transferred to Hawthorn in 1922, but never played a senior game for them.
