= Western Park, Warragul =

Western Park
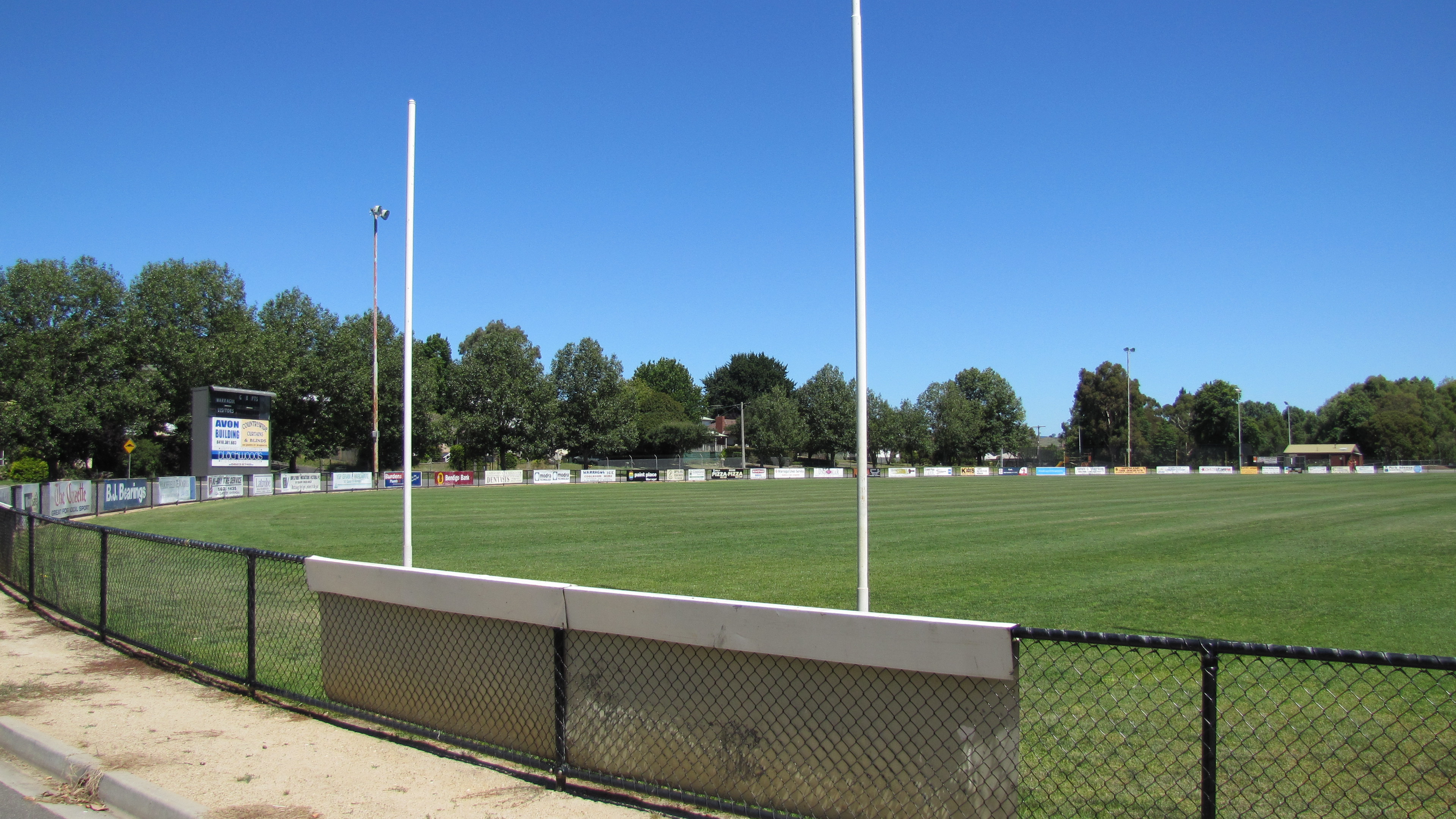
- Interactive map of Western Park
- Location: Warragul, Victoria
- Coordinates: 38.154082°S 145.920321°E
- Surface: Grass

Tenants
- Western Park Cricket Club (Warragul & District Cricket Association); Warragul Football Club (Gippsland Football League); Warragul Industrials Football Club (Ellinbank & District Football League); Western Park BMX Club Inc (BMX)

Western Park is a recreation reserve on the western side of the West Gippsland town of Warragul, Victoria.

It is the major sporting events venue in the Baw Baw Shire, followed by Eastern Park and is used by many sporting groups throughout the year.

The Venue has a floodlit football oval, Netball Courts, Tennis Courts, BMX Track, Turf Wicket and a section of the 7 km Walking Track that connects Drouin and Warragul runs through the reserve. The ground was originally named the "James Burke Reserve" but was later named Western Park after a vote by tenants.

Western Park was recently included in the Baw Baw Shire's 'Warragul Outdoor Recreational Plan' which involves upgrades of the facilities and sporting arenas.

An electronic scoreboard was installed in May 2011, allowing both football and cricket clubs to display a range of information, statistics and advertising to spectators.

A new BMX track at Western Park was opened in October 2011. The new track was designed with the advice of former junior BMX World Champion Ashley McCutcheon.

Four new lighting towers were erected in April 2012. The towers satisfy AFL Victoria's lighting standards, which makes playing football matches at the ground at night now a possibility.
