= John Gallus =

John Gallus may refer to:

- John Gallus (footballer) (born 1945), Australian rules footballer
- John Gallus (politician), US politician
