= Kevin Dore =

Australian rules footballer

Personal information
- Born: 1 January 1945 (age 81)
- Original team: Bruthen
- Height: 185 cm (6 ft 1 in)
- Weight: 78 kg (172 lb)

Playing career^{1}
Years	Club	Games (Goals)
1965–1966	South Melbourne	6 (0)
- ^{1} Playing statistics correct to the end of 1966.

Kevin Dore (born 1 January 1945) is a former Australian rules footballer who played with South Melbourne in the Victorian Football League (VFL).

Dore, a recruit from Bruthen, played as a wingman and half back. He debuted against St Kilda in the second round of the 1965 VFL season. Due to his sister's wedding, Dore wasn't available for South Melbourne's next game and didn't make it back into the senior side for the rest of the year. In the 1966 VFL season, Dore appeared in five games, from rounds 6 to 10. He then returned to Gippsland and played firstly at Bairnsdale, before a stint with Sale. In 1971 and 1972, Dore was coach of Maffra.
