= Trent Knobel =

Australian rules footballer (born 1980)

Personal information
- Born: 23 May 1980 (age 46) Gold Coast, Queensland
- Children: Max (born 2004)
Australian rules football career
Personal information
- Original team: Broadbeach (QAFL)
- Draft: No. 54, 1999 rookie draft
- Debut: Round 14, 9 June 2000, Brisbane vs. Kangaroos, at Docklands Stadium
- Height: 202 cm (6 ft 8 in)
- Weight: 102 kg (225 lb)
- Position: Ruckman
Playing career^{1}
Years	Club	Games (Goals)
2000—2001	Brisbane	13 (0)
2002—2004	St Kilda	41 (8)
2005—2007	Richmond	21 (4)
Total		75 (12)
- ^{1} Playing statistics correct to the end of 2007.
Career highlights
- AFL pre-season premiership player: 2004; Vic Country Medal: 2016

Trent Knobel (born 23 May 1980) is a former Australian rules footballer who played for the Brisbane Lions, the St Kilda Football Club, and the Richmond Football Club in the Australian Football League (AFL) from 2000 to 2007.

Knobel was born in Mullumbimby, in the Northern Rivers region of New South Wales, before later relocating to the Gold Coast with his family, growing up there. He was a prominent competitive swimmer throughout his childhood and adolescence, winning titles under-age in both pool and surfing, and notably being the training partner of future Olympic swimmer Grant Hackett.

In 1996, a friend convinced him to try football, with Knobel ultimately taking to the sport, playing for Broadbeach in the Queensland Australian Football League (QAFL). At 18, he was drafted by the Brisbane Lions with pick 54 in the 1999 rookie draft.

Aged 20, Knobel made his senior debut for the Brisbane Lions in Round 14 of the 2000 AFL season, against North Melbourne at Docklands Stadium. Following two seasons and 13 games with Brisbane, he was traded to St Kilda at the conclusion of the 2001 season, playing 41 games there from 2002 to 2004 before being delisted; he was then selected with pick 1 of the 2005 pre-season draft by Richmond, where he played 21 games from 2005 to 2007, when he retired from AFL level.

Following his retirement, he returned to his home state, where he played for the Labrador Tigers in the Queensland Australian Football League (QAFL), helming a ruck tandem with Peter "Spida" Everitt and making a grand final appearance in 2010, losing to Morningside. He later joined Maffra Football Club in the Gippsland League (GL), where he won the Vic Country Medal in the 2016 GL Grand Final. His son, Max (born 2004), has been with the Gold Coast Suns since 2024, having previously been at Fremantle from 2022—2024.

== Early life ==
Trent Knobel was born on 23 May 1980 in Mullumbimby, in the Northern Rivers region of New South Wales. He and his family later moved to the Gold Coast, Queensland, where he resided for the bulk of his childhood. Throughout his childhood and adolescence, he was a prominent competitive swimmer, winning titles under-age in both pool and surfing, and was the training partner of future Olympic swimmer Grant Hackett. In 1996, a friend in year 11 at Broadbeach, Queensland, convinced Knobel to try football.

== Career ==
A ruckman, Knobel was drafted from the Broadbeach Football Club in the Queensland Australian Football League (QAFL) to the Brisbane Lions in his home state with pick 54 in the 1999 rookie draft, consequently being added to their rookie list. At the age of 20, he made his debut against North Melbourne in Round 14 of the 2000 season at Docklands Stadium following good form at reserves level in the QAFL. Knobel subsequently retained his place in the side for much of the season, including playing in two finals.

After a disappointing 2001 season for Knobel, and with the Lions having list depth in the ruck position (Keating, Charman, McDonald, McLaren, amongst others), he was traded alongside their third-round selection, pick 49 (Josh Houlihan), to the St Kilda Football Club in return for the club's third-round selection, pick 45 (Nathan Clarke), in the 2001 national draft. Across his two seasons at Brisbane, he made 13 appearances at senior level.

Knobel faced diminished returns with St Kilda across his first two seasons in 2002 and 2003; the latter being derailed by a serious neck injury suffered in the Round 11 win over Brisbane at Docklands Stadium on 7 June 2003, where he landed heavily during a ruck contest and was taken from the ground concussed. Further tests revealed he had damaged his cervical vertebrae—specifically the C1 "atlas" vertebrae—subsequently requiring him to spend the next six weeks in a neck brace. His 2004 season was much improved, playing all 24 games and becoming their number one ruckman. Despite his crash and bash ruck craft and a total of 460 hitouts for the year, he was criticised for his lack of around the ground work, averaging just six disposals for the season. This ultimately led to him being delisted by St Kilda.

Following his delisting, he was selected with pick 1 by the Richmond Football Club in the 2005 pre-season draft, held prior to the 2005 season. He played 18 games in the 2005 season, performing better around the ground, before missing 3 games late in the year with a pulled hamstring.

Knobel played just 3 games in the 2006 season, being overlooked for selection in favour of in-form ruck Troy Simmonds. Due to ongoing injury concerns, Knobel was unable to play a senior game in 2007 and announced his retirement from AFL football on 28 August 2007, following 75 career games and 12 goals across his three clubs. He played 21 of those games for Richmond, kicking 4 goals in that time.

== Post-AFL career ==
Following his retirement from AFL, Knobel joined the Labrador Tigers in the Queensland Australian Football League (QAFL). Knobel and ex-St Kilda, Hawthorn and Sydney footballer Peter "Spida" Everitt formed a "potent" dual ruck tandem, helming the Tigers to the 2010 grand final against Morningside. In 2015, he joined Maffra Football Club in the Gippsland League (GL), achieving a premiership with them in 2016 and winning the Vic Country Medal, awarded by the umpires for best-on-ground.

His son, Max (born 2004), has been on the Gold Coast Suns list since 2024, having previously been on Fremantle's list from 2022—2024. He is yet to play a senior game.

== Player profile ==
Knobel was primarily used as a ruckman, and measured at 202 centimetres and 100 kilograms. Then-Brisbane coach, Leigh Matthews, described him as being "tall and strong" who "marks the ball alright" and has "a bit of body strength".

== Honours and achievements ==
=== Team ===
- AFL pre-season premiership player (St Kilda): 2004

=== Individual ===
- Vic Country Medal: 2016
