= West Gippsland Gazette =

Former newspaper in Victoria, Australia

Front page of first issue, 5 July 1898

The West Gippsland Gazette was a newspaper published in Warragul, Victoria, Australia.

== History ==
The newspaper was published from 5 July 1898 to 23 December 1930 by A.J. Harvey and Co.

== Digitisation ==
The newspaper has been digitised and is available via Trove.
