= Maurie Reeves =

Australian rules footballer

Personal information
- Full name: Maurice Joseph Reeves
- Born: 28 February 1930
- Died: 30 September 2013 (aged 83)
- Original team: Warragul
- Height: 175 cm (5 ft 9 in)
- Weight: 77.5 kg (171 lb)

Playing career^{1}
Years	Club	Games (Goals)
1953	Melbourne	10 (4)
- ^{1} Playing statistics correct to the end of 1953.

Maurice Joseph Reeves (28 February 1930 – 30 September 2013) was an Australian rules footballer who played with Melbourne in the Victorian Football League (VFL).
