= Vic Trood =

Australian rules footballer

Personal information
- Full name: Thomas Victor Trood
- Born: 16 December 1891; Sale, Victoria
- Died: 16 October 1977 (aged 85); Canterbury, Victoria
- Original team: Sale (GFA)

Playing career^{1}
| Years | Club | Games (Goals) |
| 1911–14 | University | 41 (11) |
- ^{1} Playing statistics correct to the end of 1914.

Thomas Victor "Vic" Trood (16 December 1891 – 16 October 1977) was an Australian rules footballer who played with University in the Victorian Football League (VFL).

Born in Sale, Victoria, Trood was the son of Charles Trood and the brother of leading Sale footballer, Arthur.

Making his VFL debut in the 1911 VFL season, Trood was involved in a nasty incident in round 4 1911 when he was knocked unconscious. Carlton's Martin Gotz was charged and found guilty of assault, although this was later quashed on Appeal.

Following the commencement of World War I, University withdrew from the VFL at the conclusion of the 1914 season and Trood returned to Sale after the War to join his brother Arthur at Sale Football Club.

Trood was a former President of the Gippsland Football League and was instrumental in the formation of the Latrobe Valley League in 1954, as the league's inaugural President.

The best and fairest award in the Gippsland Football League has been known as the Trood Award since 1928 after Trood initially donated this award and continued to do so for many years in his role as Sale Football Club delegate and Gippsland Football League president.
