= Ashley Green (footballer) =

Australian rules footballer

Personal information
- Full name: Ashley Green
- Born: 6 April 1973 (age 53)
- Original team: Warragul
- Draft: 19th, 1989 VFL draft Essendon
- Height: 189 cm (6 ft 2 in)
- Weight: 90 kg (198 lb)

Playing career^{1}
Years	Club	Games (Goals)
1992–1993	Brisbane Bears	23 (2)
- ^{1} Playing statistics correct to the end of 1993.

Ashley Green (born 6 April 1973) is a former Australian rules footballer who played with the Brisbane Bears in the Australian Football League (AFL).

Green was initially a 1989 VFL draftee, chosen by Essendon with the 19th selection. He only played reserves during his time at Essendon and went to Brisbane after the Bears elected to use the first pick of the 1992 Pre-Season Draft on him.

A utility, he was a regular member of the Brisbane side in 1992 with 18 appearances but played only five times in 1993.

In late 2012, he was appointed the Senior coach of the Gippsland Football League's Warragul Football Club. This was his second stint coaching the club.
