= Noel Price (footballer) =

Australian rules footballer (1917–1984)

Personal information
- Full name: Noel John Price
- Born: 27 December 1917; Yarragon, Victoria
- Died: 17 July 1984 (aged 66); Dandenong, Victoria
- Original team: Warragul
- Height: 179 cm (5 ft 10 in)
- Weight: 78 kg (172 lb)

Playing career^{1}
| Years | Club | Games (Goals) |
| 1939–1942, 1944-1947 | Fitzroy | 104 (98) |
- ^{1} Playing statistics correct to the end of 1947.

Noel John Price (27 December 1917 – 17 July 1984) was an Australian rules footballer who played with Fitzroy in the Victorian Football League (VFL).

== Family ==
The fourth and youngest child of Richmond footballer Joseph Allister Price (1886-1985), and Ellen May Price (1886-1973), née Horrocks, Noel John Price was born at Yarragon, Victoria on 27 December 1917.

He married Jean Caldwell Yemm (1913-2000) in 1942.

== Football ==
Recruited from Warragul, he wore the number 22 and was a half forward flanker.

== Military service ==
Price's Fitzroy career was interrupted by his service in the Royal Australian Air Force during World War II.
