= Marist-Sion College =

Location
- 165 Burke Street; Warragul, Victoria, 3820; Australia; 38°9′37″S 145°54′48″E

Information
- Type: Independent, co-educational secondary school
- Motto: Truth, Charity and Constancy
- Religious affiliations: Roman Catholic; Association of Marist Schools of Australia
- Established: 1975
- Principal: Lisa Harkin
- Years: 7–12
- Enrolment: ~1077
- Campus type: Regional
- Houses: Champagnat, Jericho, Joseph, Loreto, Lourdes, MacKillop, Marcellin, Sion
- Colours: Green, white and gold
- Website: www.mscw.vic.edu.au

Marist-Sion College is a co-educational Roman Catholic independent school founded in 1975 and located in Warragul, Victoria, Australia.

Marist-Sion College enrols students from towns spanning from Trafalgar to Nar Nar Goon, Neerim District and Ellinbank District. Marist-Sion College serves four local parishes: Warragul, Drouin, Trafalgar and Iona/Maryknoll.

== History ==
Marist-Sion College was formed in 1975 as a result of a merger between St Joseph's College and Our Lady of Sion College.

St Joseph's College was a secondary school for boys, which was founded in 1951. Our Lady of Sion College was a secondary school for girls, which was founded in 1905.

== Notable alumni ==
- Craig Hutchison
- Bob Murphy
- Tom Papley
- Trent Hotton

== See also ==
- List of schools in Victoria
