= Mike Collins (Australian footballer, born 1939) =

Australian rules footballer

Personal information
- Full name: Michael Collins
- Born: 25 April 1939 (age 87)
- Original team: Heyfield
- Height: 175 cm (5 ft 9 in)
- Weight: 74 kg (163 lb)

Playing career^{1}
Years	Club	Games (Goals)
1961–1962	Melbourne	4 (1)
- ^{1} Playing statistics correct to the end of 1962.

Michael Collins (born 25 April 1939) is a former Australian rules footballer who played with Melbourne in the Victorian Football League (VFL).

Collins is the son of 1926 Melbourne premiership player Jack Collins and the younger brother of former Melbourne captain Geoff Collins.

== Career ==
A defender, Collins joined Melbourne in 1961, from Heyfield in the Latrobe Valley Football League (LVFL).

Mid-season, Collins suffered minor injuries when a car in which he was a passenger crashed in Bentleigh. His teammate Len Mann broke his arm and was out for the rest of the year.

Collins didn't make his league debut until Melbourne's round 18 win over Carlton. He kept his spot in the team for the semi-final against Hawthorn, which Melbourne lost by seven points. After cramping badly, Collins had to come off in the third quarter. He missed out on selection for the preliminary final. The following year he made only two more senior appearances, in rounds three and four.

He won the LVFL's best and fairest award in 1964, while playing for Yallourn.

== Links ==
- Mike Collins’s playing statistics at AFL Tables
- Mike Collins profile at Demonwiki
- Mike Collins photo at Virtual Yallourn
