= Ted Fidge =

Australian rules footballer

Personal information
- Full name: Ted Fidge
- Born: 7 June 1963 (age 63)
- Original teams: St Peter's, East Bentleigh
- Height: 175 cm (5 ft 9 in)
- Weight: 81 kg (179 lb)
- Position: Forward

Playing career^{1}
Years	Club	Games (Goals)
1982–1988	Melbourne	42 (61)
- ^{1} Playing statistics correct to the end of 1988.

Ted Fidge (born 7 June 1963) is a former Australian rules footballer who played with Melbourne in the Victorian Football League (VFL).

Fidge, recruited from St Peter's, started his VFL career in 1982, playing nine games for the season. A forward, Fidge made another nine appearances in 1983 but did not feature at all in the 1984 season; however, he was a member of the Melbourne Reserves premiership team. He kicked 27 goals for Melbourne in 1985, from 15 games, which saw him finish second in their goalkicking. In 1986, he played eight games and missed an entire season again in 1987. He made only one appearance in 1988, but it was memorable, as he was reported for striking Collingwood player Darren Millane, for which he got a six-week suspension. It would be Fidge's last game for Melbourne, as he was delisted at the end of the season after undergoing a groin operation.

He captain-coached Sale in the 1989 and 1990 Latrobe Valley Football League seasons. The club finished third both times.

His younger brother John Fidge also played for Melbourne.

In 2023, aged 60, Fidge told A Current Affair that he had chronic traumatic encephalopathy (CTE) as a result of his football career, mentioning that medical costs had wiped out his superannuation and that his wife was his full-time carer despite also having a job; they criticised the AFL's lack of support, and Fidge says he will donate his brain to science.
