= Arthur Davidson (footballer, born 1912) =

Australian rules footballer, born 1912

Personal information
- Full name: Arthur Davidson
- Born: 30 November 1912
- Died: 14 December 2002 (aged 90)
- Original teams: Sale, Camberwell
- Height: 173 cm (5 ft 8 in)
- Weight: 61 kg (134 lb)

Playing career^{1}
Years	Club	Games (Goals)
1939	Hawthorn	7 (19)
- ^{1} Playing statistics correct to the end of 1939.

Arthur Davidson (30 November 1912 – 14 December 2002) was an Australian rules footballer who played for the Hawthorn Football Club in the Victorian Football League (VFL).

Davidson was from Sale originally. Davidson won Sale’s 1933 club best and fairest gold medal award. Davidson won the 1935 Gippsland Football League's best and fairest award, the Trood Award prior to joining his older brother Hec Davidson at Camberwell in 1936.

His statistics at Camberwell FC were – 47 games and 96 goals, (1936–38). Camberwell best and fairest 1938.
