= John Nix (Australian footballer) =

Australian rules footballer (1931–2024)

Personal information
- Full name: John Joseph Nix
- Born: 25 December 1931
- Died: 28 December 2024 (aged 93)
- Original team: Trafalgar
- Height: 178 cm (5 ft 10 in)
- Weight: 79 kg (174 lb)

Playing career^{1}
Years	Club	Games (Goals)
1949–1956	Richmond	95 (18)
- ^{1} Playing statistics correct to the end of 1956.

John Joseph Nix (25 December 1931 – 28 December 2024) was an Australian rules footballer who played with Richmond in the Victorian Football League (VFL).

== Biography ==
Nix, a centreman recruited from Trafalgar, debuted at VFL level aged just 17. He made 95 league appearances for Richmond, between 1949 and 1956. His best season was in 1952, when he played in all of Richmond's 19 games and polled eight Brownlow Medal votes.

At the end of the 1956 season, Nix was appointed playing coach of Latrobe Valley Football League side Sale. He won the league's best and fairest award in 1957 and also steered Sale to that year's premiership. Sale were premiers again in 1959, Nix's third and final season at the club. From 1960 to 1962, Nix was captain-coach of Mornington, in the Mornington Peninsula Football League. He led them to a premiership in his first season.

In 1966, Nix returned to the Tigers as Reserve Grade coach, and led them to a premiership in his first season. Nix’s Tiger Reserves won all twenty games – including the second semi and Grand Final – on the scoreboard, but were denied an official perfect season (Note: The only teams to have accomplished a true perfect season in any grade of VFL/AFL football have been Geelong Reserves in 1930 and Essendon Under-19s in 1950.) because they played an unregistered player, Frank Loughran, in three games against Carlton, Footscray and Collingwood Reserves. Nix would continue as Tiger Reserves coach for a further three seasons, during which the team reached the finals every year but were defeated in both the 1967 and 1968 Grand Finals, and finished second before losing both their finals in 1969.

Nix was a policeman throughout his playing career and he later ran a newsagency in Belgrave. He is also the father-in-law of former Richmond player Matthew Wall.

Nix died on 28 December 2024, at the age of 93.
