= Gerry Lynn =

Australian rules footballer

Personal information
- Full name: Gerard Ian Lynn
- Born: 24 August 1955
- Died: 12 June 1992 (aged 36); Moormbool West
- Original team: Warragul
- Height: 175 cm (5 ft 9 in)
- Weight: 76 kg (168 lb)

Playing career^{1}
Years	Club	Games (Goals)
1974–1975	Hawthorn	3 (0)
- ^{1} Playing statistics correct to the end of 1975.

Gerard Ian Lynn (24 August 1955 – 12 June 1992) was an Australian rules footballer who played with Hawthorn in the Victorian Football League (VFL).

A rover from Warragul, Lynn made his league debut in round 11 of the 1974 VFL season, against North Melbourne at Arden Street and made his only other appearance of the year four weeks later at Princes Park in a win over South Melbourne. In 1975 and 1976 he broke into the seniors just once, with a strong Hawthorn team making the grand final in both seasons. He polled the second most votes in the 1975 Gardiner Medal.

In 1992 Lynn was killed, along with four others, when the single-engine Piper Cherokee he was traveling in crash into a farm at the Victorian town of Moormbool West. He had been flying to a harness-racing meeting at Ouyen.
