= Alan Fields =

Australian rules footballer, born 1914

Personal information
- Born: 29 March 1914
- Died: 21 February 1998 (aged 83)
- Original team: Warragul
- Height: 188 cm (6 ft 2 in)
- Weight: 83 kg (183 lb)

Playing career^{1}
Years	Club	Games (Goals)
1939–1947	Fitzroy	57 (27)
- ^{1} Playing statistics correct to the end of 1947.

Alan Fields (29 March 1914 – 21 February 1998) was an Australian rules footballer who played with Fitzroy in the Victorian Football League (VFL) during the 1940s.

Fields was a defender and debuted in 1939, appearing for the club 19 times in his first two seasons before missing the 1941, 1942 and 1943 seasons as he was serving in World War 2 in the 2nd/7th Australian Infantry Battalion. He returned in 1944 and won a premiership.
