= Ed Ryan (Australian footballer) =

Australian rules footballer, born 1902

Personal information
- Full name: Edward John Ryan
- Born: 19 August 1902; Woods Point, Victoria
- Died: 29 December 1975 (aged 73); Berrigan, New South Wales
- Original team: Sale
- Height: 180 cm (5 ft 11 in)

Playing career^{1}
Years	Club	Games (Goals)
1926	Fitzroy	3 (0)
- ^{1} Playing statistics correct to the end of 1926.

Edward John Ryan (19 August 1902 – 29 December 1975) was an Australian rules footballer who played with Fitzroy in the Victorian Football League (VFL).
