= Ralph Shalless =

Australian rules footballer

Personal information
- Full name: Ralph Curtis Shalless
- Born: 28 January 1923; Hobart, Tasmania
- Died: 27 October 2006 (aged 83)
- Height: 178 cm (5 ft 10 in)
- Weight: 89 kg (196 lb)

Playing career^{1}
Years	Club	Games (Goals)
1943, 1946	Melbourne	4 (3)
1948–49	Hawthorn	17 (3)
Total		21 (6)
- ^{1} Playing statistics correct to the end of 1949.

Ralph Curtis Shalless (28 January 1923 – 27 October 2006) was a former Australian rules footballer who played with Melbourne and Hawthorn in the Victorian Football League (VFL).

Shalless played for Melbourne reserves from 1940 and finally made his league senior debut in 1943.

He missed the next two seasons due to his service with both the Australian Army and then the Royal Australian Air Force during World War II.

Shalless was the Melbourne reserves vice-captain in 1946 and made another senior appearance late in the season.

Shalless captain/coached the Melbourne University Football Club side to the 1947 Sunraysia Football League premiership and also won League's best and fairest award in that year.

In 1948 Shalless returned to the VFL, this time playing with Hawthorn.

Shalless went on to Morwell in 1950 and won the Central Gippsland Football League Reserves best and fairest in 1951, 1952 and 1953!
