= Geoff Watt =

Australian distance runner

- Born: 1932
- Died: August, 1969; Mount Erica, Australia
- Known for: Distance running

Geoff Watt (died 1969) was a distance runner from Warragul, Victoria. He died from exposure in 1969 while training on Mount Erica in Baw Baw National Park.

- Major force behind Warragul Amateur Athletics Club.
- First to run up and down Mount Kilimanjaro.
- Father to Kathy Watt - Olympic cycling champion

The athletics track in Warragul is named in honour of Geoff Watt.

Watt was an optometrist, practicing in Moe and Warragul.
