= Bill Flynn (footballer) =

Australian rules footballer, born 1907

Personal information
- Full name: William Joseph Flynn
- Born: 26 September 1907; Drouin, Victoria
- Died: 24 May 1991 (aged 83)
- Original team: Williamstown

Playing career^{1}
Years	Club	Games (Goals)
1930	Carlton	1 (3)
1932	South Melbourne	2 (0)
Total		3 (3)
- ^{1} Playing statistics correct to the end of 1932.

William Joseph Flynn (26 September 1907 – 24 May 1991) was an Australian rules footballer who played with Carlton and South Melbourne in the Victorian Football League (VFL).

== Family ==
The son of Timothy Flynn (1866–1924), and Johanna Flynn (1871–1959), née Ahearn, William Joseph Flynn was born at Drouin, Victoria on 26 September 1907.

He married Kathleen Margaret O'Connor (1908–2002) on 16 May 1942.

== Football ==
Flynn tied with Jack Collins in the 1936 Gippsland Football League's best and fairest award, the Trood Award, when playing with Bairnsdale Football Club.
