= John Hutchinson (Australian rules footballer) =

Australian rules footballer

Personal information
- Full name: John Hutchinson
- Born: 1 July 1936
- Original team: Yallourn
- Height: 183 cm (6 ft 0 in)
- Weight: 83 kg (183 lb)

Playing career^{1}
Years	Club	Games (Goals)
1957	Fitzroy	3 (3)
- ^{1} Playing statistics correct to the end of 1957.

John Hutchinson (born 1 July 1936) is a former Australian rules footballer who played with Fitzroy in the Victorian Football League (VFL).

Originally from Yallourn Football Club, Hutchinson was granted a permit to play for Fitzroy for three games in 1957, before returning to Yallourn and completing National Service. He returned to Fitzroy in 1958 but played the year in their reserves team. He then returned to play for Yallourn until his retirement in 1966, including two years as captain-coach.
