= Harvey Johnson (Australian footballer) =

Australian rules footballer

Personal information
- Full name: Harvey David Johnson
- Born: 26 August 1907; Delegate, New South Wales
- Died: 6 October 1948 (aged 41); Drouin, Victoria
- Original team: Toongabbie / Sale
- Height: 180 cm (5 ft 11 in)

Playing career^{1}
Years	Club	Games (Goals)
1932	Hawthorn	14 (2)
- ^{1} Playing statistics correct to the end of 1932.

Harvey David Johnson (26 August 1907 – 6 October 1948) was an Australian rules footballer who played with Hawthorn in the Victorian Football League (VFL).

== Biography ==
Johnson was born in Delegate, New South Wales and played his early football in Gippsland, with Toongabbie. In 1926 he began playing for Sale in the Gippsland Football League, after the Toongabbie club became defunct.

Late in the 1927 season, Johnson was involved in controversy when prior to Sale's semi-final against Stratford it was revealed that he had made an appearance with another team during the season without a clearance, which prompted Sale to withdraw him from their team to avoid losing the game on protest. During an October meeting of Gippsland Football League delegates, Johnson admitted to playing, under an assumed name, with a club called the Stuart Mill, which was held in a competition outside the radius of the league. He was disqualified for the entire 1928 season.

Johnson, a follower, joined Hawthorn from Sale in the 1932 VFL season. His early appearances for Hawthorn showed promise and he did not miss selection for the first 12 rounds. Johnson ended up playing 14 games in what would be his only season of VFL football. He returned to Sale in 1933.

Following the Second World War, in which he served overseas, Johnson continued to live in Sale and made a living as a telephone linesman, for the Postmaster-General's Department. Johnson was one of three linesmen who died near Drouin on 6 October 1948, when the line they were taking down came into contact with a 2,200 volt high tension wire. He was killed instantly from the electric shock.
