= John Murton (footballer) =

Australian rules footballer (1942–2021)

Personal information
- Full name: John Murton
- Born: 21 June 1942
- Died: 24 October 2021 (aged 79)
- Original team: Warragul

Playing career^{1}
| Years | Club | Games (Goals) |
| 1963 | Collingwood | 2 (3) |
- ^{1} Playing statistics correct to the end of 1963.

John Murton (21 June 1942 – 24 October 2021) was an Australian rules footballer who played with Collingwood in the Victorian Football League (VFL).
