= Eastern Park, Warragul =

Eastern Park
- Interactive map of Eastern Park
- Address: Stoffers Street
- Location: Warragul, Victoria
- Coordinates: 38.154082°S 145.920321°E
- Surface: Grass

Tenants
- Warragul Cricket Club (Warragul & District Cricket Association); Colts Junior Football Club (WDJFL)

Eastern Park is a recreation reserve on the eastern side of the West Gippsland town of Warragul, Victoria.

The recreation reserve was built to cater for the growing demand for sporting fields in Warragul, especially for Australian Rules Football and Cricket. The growing demand was a result of excess usage of sister venue Western Park and the proposed closure of the football facilities at Logan Park (due to redevelopment of the existing harness racing track).

Eastern Park incorporates a junior sized football oval, adventure playground, multi purpose pavilion, The Green Shed Theatre and numerous walking tracks.

Eastern Park was recently included in the Baw Baw Shires 'Warragul Outdoor Recreational Plan' which involves upgrades of the sporting surface, playground and parking.

Home of the Colts Junior Football Club, Eastern Park provides Australian Rules Football for children aged 7 to 18 in 4 age groups including Under 10's, Under 12's, Under 14.5's and Youth Girls in the Gippsland Youth Girls League.

Eastern Park is the home of the Warragul Cricket Club, the Warragul Cricket Club hosted the GCL senior grand final for 2010/11 season, as well as the T/20 grand final for the WDCA in 2010/11.
