= Jack Mitchell (Australian footballer, born 1924) =

Australian rules footballer

Personal information
- Full name: John Patrick Mitchell
- Born: 18 September 1924; Belgrave, Victoria
- Died: 29 December 1978 (aged 54); Foster, Victoria
- Original team: Sale
- Height: 160 cm (5 ft 3 in)
- Weight: 63 kg (139 lb)

Playing career^{1}
Years	Club	Games (Goals)
1945	Melbourne	6 (9)
- ^{1} Playing statistics correct to the end of 1945.

John Patrick Mitchell (18 September 1924 – 29 December 1978) was an Australian rules footballer who played with Melbourne in the Victorian Football League (VFL).
