= Sale Football Club =

Names
- Full name: Sale Football Netball Club Inc
- Nickname(s): Magpies
- Motto: "Cede Nulli"

Club details
- Founded: 1877; 148 years ago
- Colours
- Competition: Gippsland FNL
- Premierships: 10 (1954, 1955, 1957, 1959, 1971, 1973, 1975, 1986, 2008, 2012)
- Ground(s): Sale Recreation Reserve

Uniforms
Home

The Sale Football Netball Club, nicknamed the Magpies, is an Australian rules football and netball club based in Sale, Victoria and are based at the Sale Oval.

The club teams compete in the Gippsland Football Netball League (GFNL).

== History ==
Founded in 1877, Sale began playing official competitive football in 1889 when they joined the Gippsland Football Association, as a junior side. In 1900, the club entered the senior competition and were premiers for the first time the following year.

One of the greatest players produced by the club, Brownlow Medal winner Norman Ware, came to Footscray from Sale in the 1930's.

Sale were a foundation member of the Latrobe Valley Football League in 1954. They were the dominant team in the early years of the competition, with four premierships in the first six seasons. More recently, Sale defeated Maffra to win the 2012 grand final.

== Football Premierships ==
Seniors

- Payne Challenge Cup
  - 1889
- Gippsland & Feilchenfeld Cup
  - 1892
- Gippsland Football Association / League (10)
  - 1901?, 1911, 1924, 1927, 1931, 1934, 1937, 1949, 1950, 1953
- Latrobe Valley Football League (8)
  - 1954, 1955, 1957, 1959, 1971, 1973, 1975, 1986
- West Gippsland Latrobe Football League (1)
  - 2008
- Gippsland Football League (1)
  - 2012

== Club records ==
=== Individual ===
Most games

- Jack Schuback – 400+

Most Best & Fairest

- Shane Fyfe – 5

Most goals in a game

- Shane Loveless – 15 (vs Churchill in 1987)

Most goals in a season

- Shane Loveless – 140 (1987)

=== Team ===
Highest score

- 39.20 (254) (versus Moe in 1997)

== Football League best and Fairest Winners ==
Gippsland FL
Trood Award

- 1935 - Arthur Davidson
- 1936 - Jack Collins
- 1946 - Leo Brennan (Sale Greens)
- 1952 - Bob Mason

La Trobe Valley FNL
Trood Award / Rodda Medal

- 1954 – Bob Mason
- 1955 – Bob Mason
- 1957 – John Nix

Gippsland Football League
Trood Award / Rodda Medal

- 2009 – Adrian Cox
- 2012 – Luke Collins
- 2017 - Kane Martin
- 2021 - Shannon Lange
- 2023 - Shannon Lange

== Coaches ==
Coach	Years	Premierships
Charlie Canet	1924-1927	1924, 1927
Hugh Murnane	1954-1956	1954, 1955
John Nix	1957-1959	1957, 1959
Dick Evans	1960	
Kevin Hogan	1961	
Laurie Stephenson	1962	
Don Williams	1963	
Kevin Hogan	1964-1965	
Joe Ambrose	1966-1967	
Robert Foster	1968-1970	
Trevor Somerville	1971-1972	1971
Jim Hart	1973-1978	1973, 1975
Charlie Healy	1979	
Ray Christie / Jim Hart	1980	
Graham Robbins	1981	
Robert Holmes	1982	
Vic Aanensen	1983	
Shane Dove	1984-1985	
Kevin Greenwood	1986-1987	1986
Neil Bristow	1988	
Ted Fidge	1989-1990	
Merv Neagle	1991	
Kevin Greenwood	1992-1993	
John Walsh	1994	
Darren Hall	1995-1997	
Anthony Dessent	1998-1999	
Anthony Banik	2000-2001	
Adrian Burns	2002-2003	
Richard Coulthard	2004-2005	
Darren Hall	2006-2007	
Adrian Cox	2008-2009	2008
Nick Anderson	2010-2011	
Matthew Ferguson	2012-2014	2012
Travis Ronaldson	2015	

== VFL / AFL Players ==
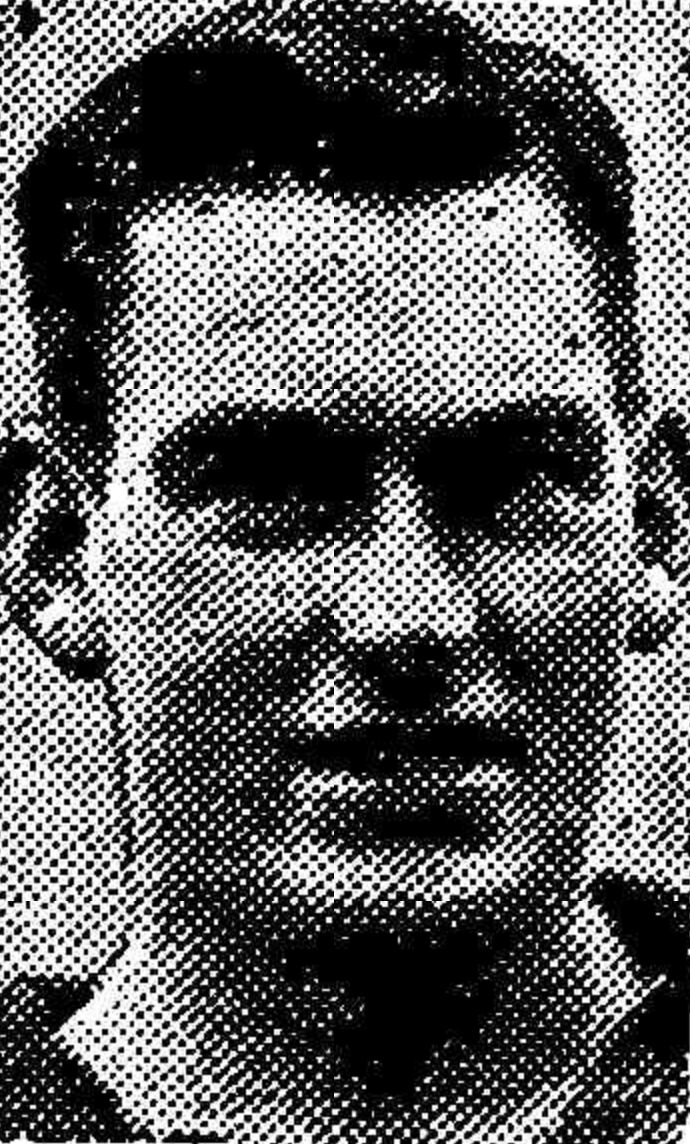
Norm Ware

The following footballers played with Sale FC before making their senior VFL / AFL football debut.

- 1906 - Robert Michael - Collingwood
- 1911 - Vic Trood - University
- 1919 - Stewart McLatchie - Carlton
- 1926 - Ed Ryan - Fitzroy
- 1930 - Wally Ware - Hawthorn
- 1932 - Harvey Johnson - Hawthorn
- 1932 - Norman Ware - Footscray
- 1939 - Arthur Davidson - Sale
- 1945 - Jack Mitchell - Melbourne
- 1961 - Ian Collins - Carlton
- 1980 - Andrew Pollett - Footscray
- 1994 - Stuart Anderson - North Melbourne
- 2003 - Jacob Schuback - Adelaide
- 2006 - Scott Pendlebury - Collingwood
- 2016 - Josh Dunkley- Western Bulldogs
- 2018 - Kyle Dunkley- Melbourne

== Notable Netballer’s ==
- Lara Dunkley-Melbourne Vixens, Queensland Firebirds
- Kate Eddy-NSW Swifts, Melbourne Vixens
