= Robert Michael (footballer) =

Australian rules footballer

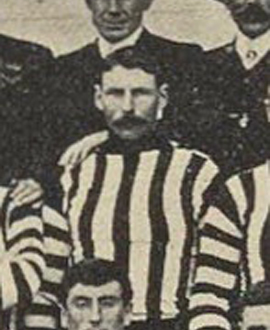
- Michael in 1906

Personal information
- Full name: Robert Michael
- Born: 13 June 1879; Sale, Victoria
- Died: 20 March 1963 (aged 83); Traralgon, Victoria
- Original team: Sale
- Height: 184 cm (6 ft 0 in)
- Weight: 83 kg (183 lb)

Playing career^{1}
Years	Club	Games (Goals)
1906	Collingwood	1 (0)
- ^{1} Playing statistics correct to the end of 1906.

Robert Michael (13 June 1879 – 20 March 1963) was an Australian rules footballer who played with Collingwood in the Victorian Football League (VFL). He is the great-grandfather of triple premiership player Mal Michael.

Recruited from Sale, he did not perform well in his debut VFL game and returned to Gippsland without playing another match.
