= Paul Cameron (Australian footballer) =

Australian rules footballer

Personal information
- Full name: Paul Peter Cameron
- Born: 12 June 1904; Essendon, Victoria
- Died: 31 December 1978 (aged 74); Brunswick, Victoria
- Original team: Middle Park
- Height: 158 cm (5 ft 2 in)
- Weight: 57 kg (126 lb)

Playing career^{1}
Years	Club	Games (Goals)
1926, 1928	South Melbourne	22 (34)
1928	Carlton	2 (4)
Total		24 (38)
- ^{1} Playing statistics correct to the end of 1928.

Paul Peter Cameron (12 June 1904 – 31 December 1978) was an Australian rules footballer who played with Carlton and South Melbourne in the Victorian Football League (VFL).

Cameron joined the Yarraville Football Club in 1929.

Cameron won the 1934 Gippsland Football League best and fairest award, the Trood Medal, when he was captain / coach of the Rosedale Football Club, after being recruited from Yarraville Football Club.

Cameron was then captain / coach of Berrigan Football Club in 1935 and 1936, leading them to the 1936 Murray Football League premiership.
