= Warragul Show =

Coordinates: 38°10′2″S 145°56′5″E

The Warragul Show is an agricultural show that has been held annually on the first weekend of March since 1885 in Warragul, a town in the West Gippsland region of Victoria in Australia. The show takes place at the Warragul showgrounds, located at Logan Park where the greyhound and harness tracks are also situated. The show is run by the Warragul and West Gippsland Agricultural Society.

The Warragul Show attracts visitors from many different towns in the West Gippsland area. There are two main elements to the show: The carnival, which traditionally takes place on the first day of the event, and a variety of farming showcases and events, which occur on the second day of the event. There are also art and craft events, photography, flower arrangement and baking.

The COVID-19 pandemic forced the show to go on hiatus in 2021, as it did from 1915 to 1918 and 1940 to 1945.

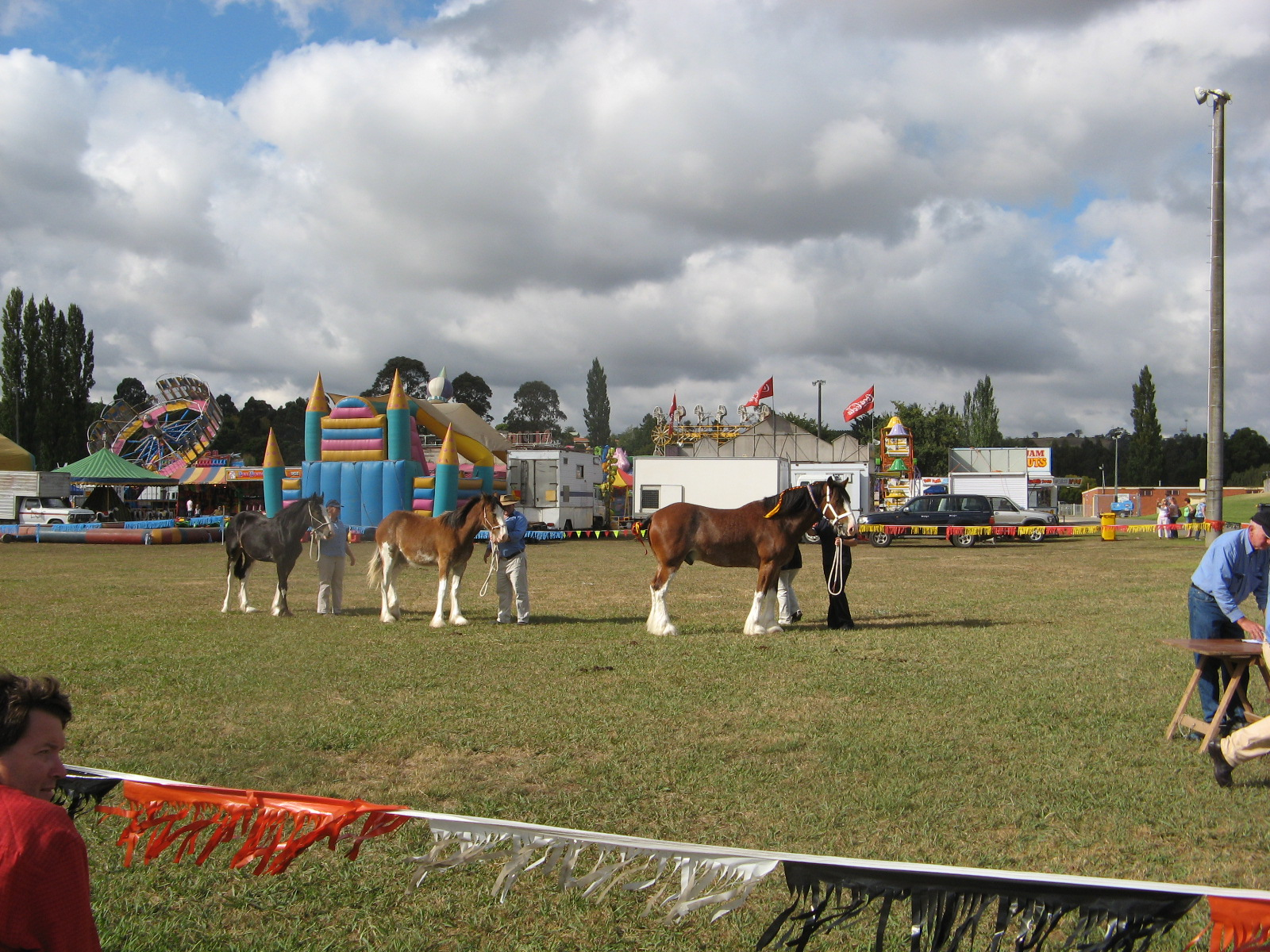
Judging of some Clydesdales on the Saturday.

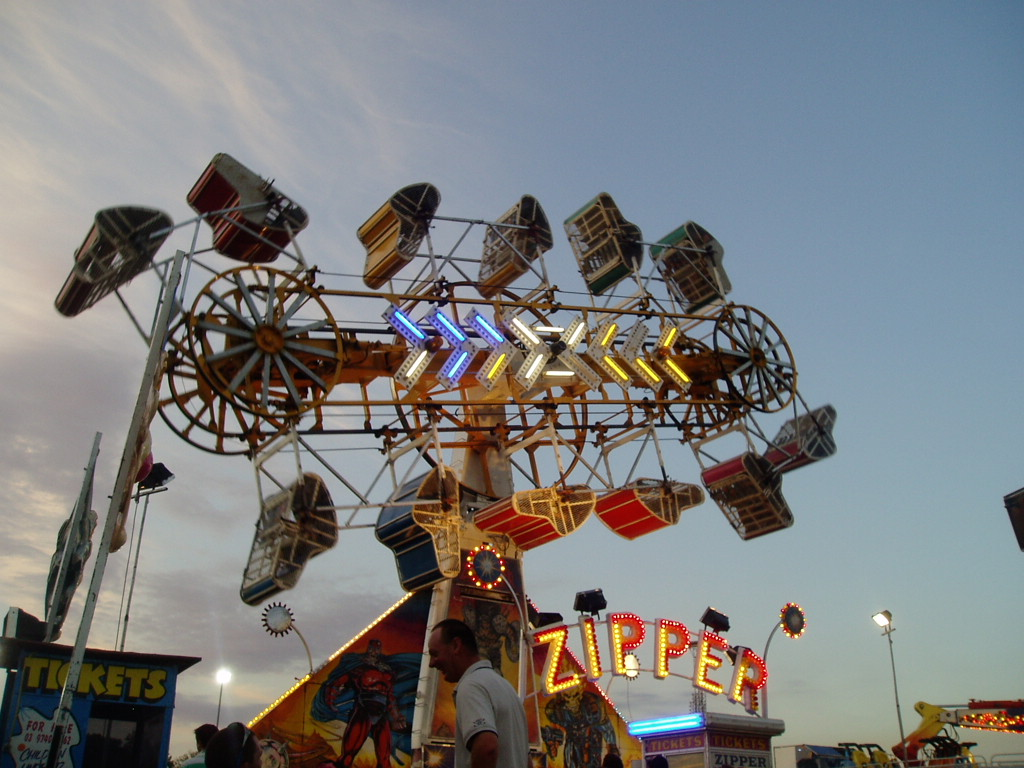
"The Zipper" at the Warragul Show
