= Matthew Watson (footballer, born 1976) =

Australian rules footballer

Personal information
- Full name: Matthew "Moose" Watson
- Born: 2 December 1976 (age 49)
- Original team: Warragul / Gippsland Power
- Height: 199 cm (6 ft 6 in)
- Weight: 98 kg (216 lb)

Playing career^{1}
Years	Club	Games (Goals)
1997	Essendon	1 (0)
- ^{1} Playing statistics correct to the end of 1997.

Matthew Watson (born 2 December 1976) is a former Australian rules footballer who played with Essendon in the Australian Football League (AFL). Watson was a ruckman, who came to Essendon from Warragul, via the Gippsland Power in the TAC Cup. He played his only senior AFL game in round 21 of the 1997 AFL season, when Essendon defeated the Brisbane Lions at the Gabba. Watson had eight disposals.
