= Harry Watson (Australian footballer) =

Australian rules footballer

Personal information
- Full name: Harry Herbert George Watson
- Born: 29 July 1896; Moe, Victoria
- Died: 25 January 1941 (aged 44); Geelong West, Victoria
- Original team: Warragul

Playing career^{1}
Years	Club	Games (Goals)
1921	Fitzroy	1 (0)
- ^{1} Playing statistics correct to the end of 1921.

Harry Herbert George Watson (29 July 1896 – 25 January 1941) was an Australian rules footballer who played with Fitzroy in the Victorian Football League (VFL).
