= Graeme Gahan =

Australian rules footballer and coach (1942–2018)

Personal information
- Full name: Graeme Arthur Gahan
- Born: 10 January 1942
- Died: 23 February 2018 (aged 76)
- Original team: Richmond Thirds
- Height: 185 cm (6 ft 1 in)
- Weight: 86 kg (190 lb)
- Position: Defender

Playing career^{1}
Years	Club	Games (Goals)
1959–66	Richmond	89 (7)
- ^{1} Playing statistics correct to the end of 1966.

Graeme Arthur Gahan (10 January 1942 – 23 February 2018) was an Australian rules footballer who played with Richmond in the Victorian Football League (VFL).

Used mostly as a half back, Gahan spent eight seasons at Richmond. He moved to Tasmania in 1967, captain-coaching Scottsdale. An Orchard Trophy winner in his first year, Gahan steered Scottsdale to a Northern Tasmanian Football Association premiership in 1968. The following season he crossed to Glenorchy as coach and they finished fifth in both of his years in charge.

Gahan, who was also a professional sprinter, was later a successful coach with Warragul in the Latrobe Valley Football League.
