= St Paul's Anglican Grammar School =

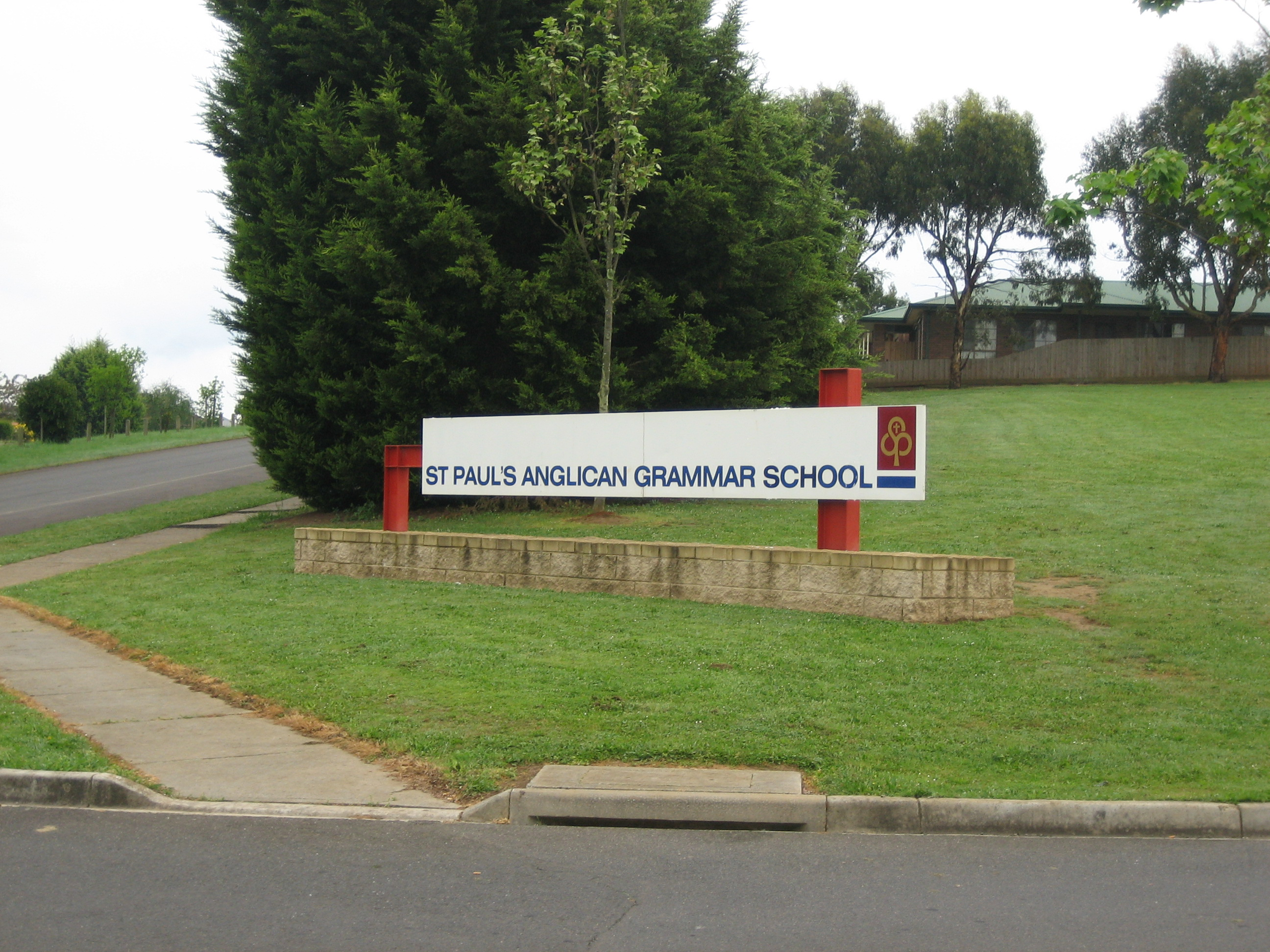
- Entrance to St Paul's

Location
- Warragul, Victoria; Australia -38.14747623125537, 145.93121696453795

Information
- Type: private school, co-educational early learning, primary, and secondary day school
- Religious affiliation: Anglicanism
- Established: 1982; 44 years ago
- Principal: Cameron Herbert
- Staff: ~450
- Grades: Early learning and K–12
- Enrolment: ~2,100
- Campuses: Warragul; Traralgon; Drouin
- Colours: red, gold, blue and white
- Slogan: Wisdom Integrity Compassion Respect
- Affiliations: Independent Primary School Heads of Australia; South Eastern Independent Schools Association; Association of Heads of Independent Schools of Australia; Ecumenical Schools Australia
- Website: www.stpaulsags.vic.edu.au

St Paul's Anglican Grammar School is a co-educational, independent, day school located in Warragul, Victoria, the school educates from ELC to Year 12. Founded in 1982, St Paul’s Anglican Grammar School was established by local families and has grown from humble beginnings to now educate students across Gippsland at campuses in Warragul, Traralgon and Drouin. The school provides education from pre-kindergarten through to Year 12 and offers the Victorian Certificate of Education (VCE), serving families across the Gippsland region.

Founded within the traditions of the Anglican Church, the school incorporates its ethos and values into campus life through chapel services and faith-based studies, which form part of the educational program.

== Campuses ==
St Paul’s Anglican Grammar School operates three campuses in the Gippsland region.

The Warragul Campus, established in 1982, offers education from early learning to Year 12 and includes facilities for academic, performing arts and sporting activities, as well as access to Brooker Park.

The Traralgon Campus, located in the Latrobe Valley, provides education from early learning to Year 12 and is located on extensive grounds that reach to the Latrobe River wetlands.

The Drouin Campus, opened in 2025, provides education for kindergarten and primary students on a 36-acre site.

== History ==
St Paul’s Anglican Grammar School was founded by local families in Warragul, commencing with 19 Year 7 students in the Sunday School rooms of St Paul’s Anglican Church in 1982.

The school relocated to its current Warragul site in 1984 and expanded to include kindergarten to Year 12. In 2002, the Traralgon Campus was established, initially offering early learning and primary education before extending to secondary levels. A third campus was opened in Drouin in 2025, initially catering to early years and primary students.

== Principals ==
The school has been served by the following Principals: Dr Des Parker OAM 1982-1992, Mr Richard Prideaux 1993-2006, Mr Mark Robertson 2007-2010, Mr Michael Clapper (Executive Principal) 2010, Ms Lisa Moloney 2010-2017 and Mr Cameron Herbert 2018-Present.

== Affiliations ==
The school is a member of: South Eastern Independent Schools Association, Ecumenical Schools Australia, Association of Heads of Independent Schools of Australia and Independent Primary School Heads of Australia.

== See also ==
- List of non-government schools in Victoria
