= John Gallus (footballer) =

Australian rules footballer

Personal information
- Born: 30 September 1945 (age 81)
- Original team: Drouin
- Height: 191 cm (6 ft 3 in)
- Weight: 94 kg (207 lb)

Playing career^{1}
Years	Club	Games (Goals)
1971–1972	Melbourne	28 (39)
- ^{1} Playing statistics correct to the end of 1972.

John Gallus (born 30 September 1945) is a former Australian rules footballer who played with Melbourne in the Victorian Football League (VFL).

== Career ==
Gallus, a ruckman and forward, first joined Melbourne in the early 1960s, from Drouin. In his first stint at the club, Gallus appeared in the VFL reserves competition, before leaving for Waverley, where he played in the 1966 VFA season, mostly as a centre half-forward. He was a member of the Waverley team which lost to Port Melbourne in the 1966 VFA Division 1 Grand Final.

From 1967 to 1970, Gallus played in the Latrobe Valley Football League (LVFL), for Bairnsdale and Maffra. He won the league's best and fairest award while at Bairnsdale in 1969 and won it again in 1970, with Maffra.

Back at Melbourne in 1971, Gallus played 20 senior games in his debut league season. He kicked three goals on debut, in a 105-point win over South Melbourne. His 31 goals for the year was the second most by a Melbourne player, behind Paul Callery, who kicked 38. He played a further eight games in the 1972 VFL season.

He later returned to Drouin to finish his career, after playing for Warragul and winning a third LVFL best and fairest award, in 1975.
