= Adrian Cox =

Australian rules footballer

Personal information
- Born: 8 September 1980 (age 46)
- Original team: Heyfield/Gippsland Power
- Debut: Round 1, 1999, Hawthorn vs. Collingwood, at the M.C.G
- Height: 181 cm (5 ft 11 in)
- Weight: 84 kg (185 lb)

Playing career^{1}
Years	Club	Games (Goals)
1999–2004	Hawthorn	54 (27)
- ^{1} Playing statistics correct to the end of 2004.

Adrian Cox (born 8 September 1980) is a former Australian rules footballer who played with Hawthorn in the AFL.

A half back flanker, Cox was a strong rebound player and used his pace to run the ball up the wing. He had a trademark bald head which made him instantly recognisable on the field and made his debut in 1999 after being a member of the pre season premiership side.

As playing coach, he steered Sale to a West Gippsland Latrobe Football League premiership in 2008.
