= Jim Shaw (footballer) =

Australian rules footballer

Personal information
- Full name: Jim Shaw
- Born: 16 October 1924
- Died: 8 October 2009 (aged 84)
- Original team: Yallourn

Playing career^{1}
Years	Club	Games (Goals)
1949	Melbourne	3 (2)
- ^{1} Playing statistics correct to the end of 1949.

Jim Shaw (16 October 1924 – 8 October 2009) was an Australian rules footballer who played with Melbourne in the Victorian Football League (VFL).

Shaw won the 1953 Central Gippsland Football League best and fairest, the Rodda Medal, when playing for Yallourn.
