= Noel Ross =

Australian rules footballer

Personal information
- Full name: Albert Noel Ross
- Born: 25 December 1922; Auburn, Victoria
- Died: 18 March 2003 (aged 80); Foster, Victoria
- Original team: Foster
- Height: 183 cm (6 ft 0 in)
- Weight: 83 kg (183 lb)
- Position: Half Forward

Playing career^{1}
Years	Club	Games (Goals)
1945–47, 1949	Richmond	35 (38)
- ^{1} Playing statistics correct to the end of 1949.

Albert Noel Ross (25 December 1922 – 18 March 2003) was an Australian rules footballer who played with Richmond in the Victorian Football League (VFL).

== Family ==
The son of John Ross (1896–1985), and Lillian Florence Ross (1898–1975), née Bridgman, Albert Noel Ross was born at Auburn, Victoria on 25 December 1922.

== Military service ==
Prior to his VFL football career, Ross served in the Australian Army during World War II.

== Football ==
=== Foster ===
He played with the Foster Football Club in the Alberton League over many years: 1937-1944, 1948 (when he won the competition's best and fairest), 1954, 1957, 1959, 1960 (captain-coach in 1954 and 1959), playing his last match at the age of 37.

=== Richmond (VFL) ===
Recruited from Foster in 1945. He played with Richmond over four seasons, 1945, 1946, 1947, and 1949 — he returned to Foster for the 1948 season — playing in 35 First XVII games and 21 Second XVIII games (including the 1947 Second's Grand Final).

=== Mirboo North ===
He played with Mirboo North for two seasons (1950-1951); and, in 1951, won the Mid Gippsland Football League's best and fairest award.
