= Horrie Farmer (footballer, born 1888) =

Australian rules footballer (1888–1934)

Personal information
- Full name: Charles Horace Farmer
- Born: 6 October 1888; Eaglehawk, Victoria
- Died: 27 April 1934 (aged 45); West Gippsland Hospital
- Original team: St Kilda State School

Playing career^{1}
Years	Club	Games (Goals)
1907–1908	St Kilda	3 (0)
- ^{1} Playing statistics correct to the end of 1908.

Charles Horace "Horrie" Farmer (6 October 1888 – 27 April 1934) was an Australian rules footballer who played with St Kilda in the Victorian Football League (VFL).

Farmer came to St Kilda from the local state school and played with them for two seasons. He made one appearance in the 1907 VFL season and another two in the 1908 VFL season.

He spent the rest of his career at Prahran and Warragul.

His brother, Roy Farmer, played for St Kilda as well and his son, also named Horrie, played in the VFL during the 1930s.
