= Warragul =

- Town
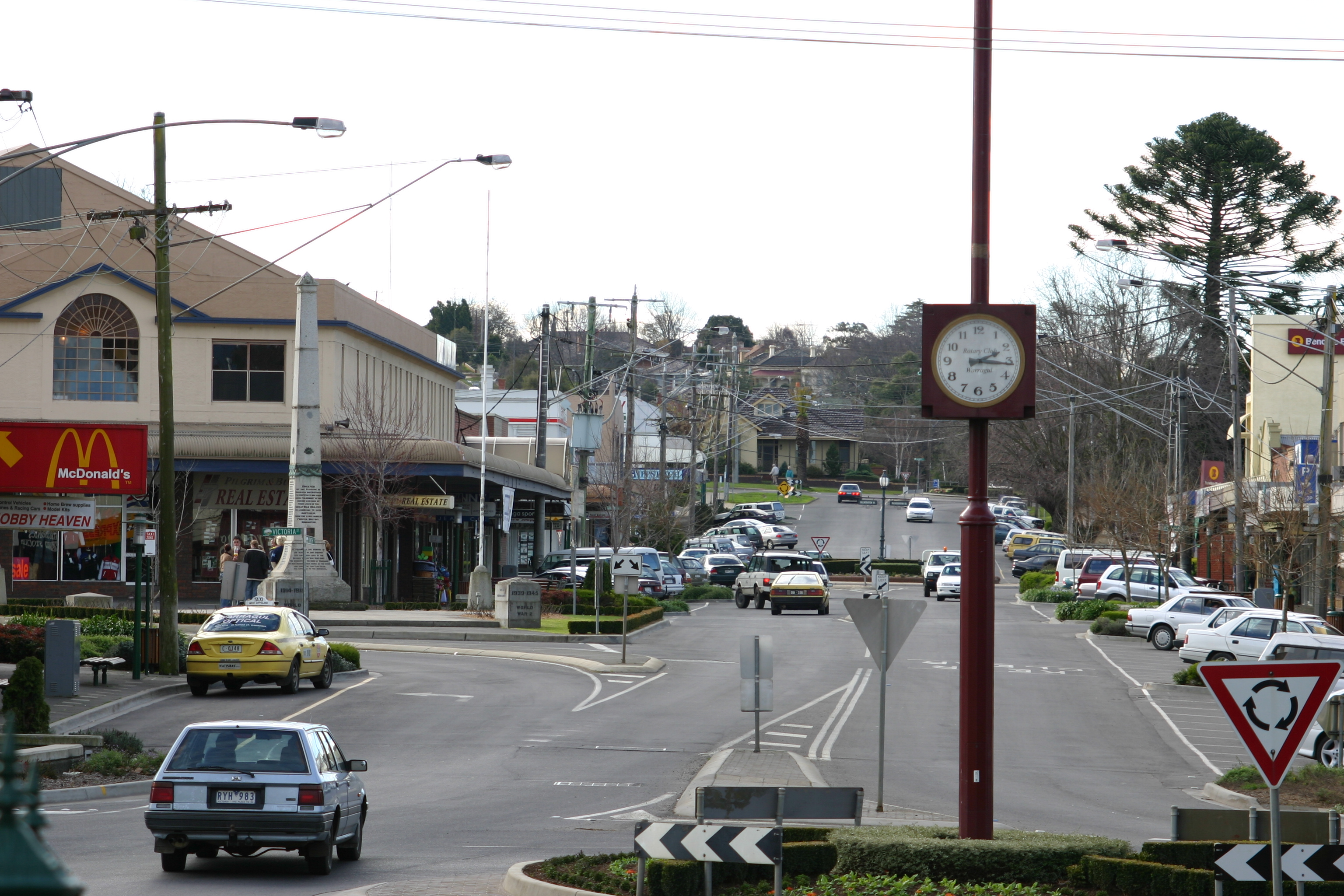

- Interactive map of Warragul
- Coordinates: 38°9′0″S 145°56′0″E
- Country: Australia
- State: Victoria
- LGA: Shire of Baw Baw
- Location: 102 km (63 mi) East of Melbourne; 32 km (20 mi) W of Moe; 7 km (4.3 mi) ESE of Drouin
- Established: 1840s

Government
  - State electorate: Narracan
  - Federal division: Monash

Area
  - Total: 55 km^{2} (21 sq mi)
- Elevation: 143.0 m (469.2 ft)

Population
  - Total: 19,856 (2021 census)
  - Density: 361/km^{2} (935/sq mi)
- Postcode: 3820
- County: Buln Buln
- Mean max temp: 19.2 °C (66.6 °F)
- Mean min temp: 8.4 °C (47.1 °F)
- Annual rainfall: 1,020.2 mm (40.17 in)
Localities around Warragul
Drouin East	Lillico	Nilma North
Drouin	Warragul	Nilma
Drouin South	Lardner	Bull Swamp

Warragul (/ˈwɒrəɡʊl/) is a town in Victoria, Australia, 102 kilometres (63 miles) south-east of Melbourne. Warragul lies between the Strzelecki Ranges to the south and the Mount Baw Baw Plateau of the Great Dividing Range to the north. As of the 2021 census, the town had a population of 19,856 people. Warragul forms part of a larger urban area that includes nearby Drouin that had an estimated total population of 42,827 as of the 2021 census.

Warragul is the main population and service centre of the West Gippsland region and the Shire of Baw Baw. The surrounding area is noted for dairy farming and other niche agriculture and has long been producing gourmet foods.

== Naming ==
Warragul (or warrigal, worrigle, warragal) is a New South Wales Indigenous word from the Darug language meaning a wild, undomesticated dingo. The town name is accepted to mean wild dog and various businesses in the town use the words 'Wild Dog' in their name.

However, the word was recorded as being used by settlers of Gippsland in the 1840s and 1850s to mean wild Aboriginal or a Gunai/Kurnai person. The traditional land of the Gunai/Kurnai people includes the town of Warragul, then intersects with Boonwurrung territory to the west of the town.

In 1851, British botanist Daniel Bunce recorded warragul as a Boonwurrung language word meaning wild, ferocious and enemy. P D Gardner suggests Bunce was correct in translation, but incorrect in origin, since the word comes from Darug. Hugh Copeland wrote in his 1934 history of Warragul that the place name was an Indigenous word meaning wild.

The word is also used for the naming of Warrigal Creek in South Gippsland to refer to the inhabitants of the area.

== History ==
The town of Warragul began as a construction camp on McLeod's Track, now Brandy Creek Road, at the point where the surveyed railway line linked to the coach road. John Lardner surveyed the townships along the line in 1877 and noted that the early arrivals in the area were squatters, who had erected their shops and dwellings on Crown land. The squatters' blocks were not offered for the first sale of town land on 2 March 1878, but were available to purchase on the second sale later that month.

In November 1873, The Victorian Parliament passed an Act approving the construction of a railway linking Oakleigh to Sale. The construction of the Gippsland railway line began simultaneously from both directions. The Warragul railway station opened on 1 March 1878 and the first train ran through in the same month. In May 1890 Warragul railway station became a junction station when a branch line was opened to Rokeby (later extended to Neerim South and Noojee).

The first Warragul post office opened on 16 March 1877 at the general store operated by James Biram, who became the first postmaster. A contract to build an official post office was made on 4 April 1887 and a foundation stone was laid on 4 June 1887. The building was completed and occupied the following year. Warragul's modern post office was opened on 3 April 1967, after the old post office closed on 18 September 1965 and was demolished in 1966.

Existing roads were renamed Princes Highway after the visit to Australia in 1920 of the then Prince of Wales (the future King Edward VIII). The highway was officially opened on 10 August 1920 at a ceremony in Warragul.

Warragul's Petersville Milk Products Factory in Queen Street supplied the famous Peters Ice Cream brand's factory in Mulgrave with all the dairy raw material (fresh cream and concentrated skim milk) for 35 years. The plant also manufactured skim milk powder under the famous Dutch Jug brand and butter under the Iceberg brand. It exported butter, butter oil and milk powders to Southeast Asia and the Middle East.

Warragul was voted Premier Town in Victoria, 1970–1973.

The Warragul Magistrates' Court closed on 1 January 1990.

== Geography ==
Warragul is located on hills that extend north from the Strzelecki Ranges near Ellinbank, joining to the Baw Baws in the Neerim District. This range is historically referred to as the Warragul Hills. The range effectively separates the flatlands of the Koo-Wee-Rup swamp (starting near Longwarry) in the west and the Moe Swamp on the eastern side (starting near Darnum).

Warragul contains the Linear Park Arts Discovery Trail, a trail covering several adjacent parks in the town. It features painted bollards, mosaics and murals. The trail joins up with the Drouin to Warragul Two Towns Trail.

== Climate ==
Warragul has an oceanic climate (Köppen: Cfb), with warm summers and cool, rainy winters. Average maxima vary from 26.2 °C (79.2 °F) in February to 12.9 °C (55.2 °F) in July, while average minima fluctuate between 13.2 °C (55.8 °F) in February and 3.8 °C (38.8 °F) in July. Precipitation is moderately abundant: (averaging 1,020.2 mm (40.17 in) per annum), and is frequent (spread between 153.9 precipitation days). Consequently, the town is not sunny, experiencing 171.4 cloudy days and only 52.6 clear days annually. Extreme temperatures have ranged from 42.3 °C (108.1 °F) on 25 February 1968 to −3.7 °C (25.3 °F) on 4 July 1963.

Climate data for Warragul (38.17°S 145.95°E, 143 m AMSL) (1962-1979 normals & extremes, rainfall 1888-2015)
Month	Jan	Feb	Mar	Apr	May	Jun	Jul	Aug	Sep	Oct	Nov	Dec	Year
Record high °C (°F)	41.7 (107.1)	42.3 (108.1)	38.1 (100.6)	31.2 (88.2)	26.1 (79.0)	20.6 (69.1)	22.2 (72.0)	24.7 (76.5)	26.7 (80.1)	32.7 (90.9)	36.7 (98.1)	38.9 (102.0)	42.3 (108.1)
Mean daily maximum °C (°F)	25.9 (78.6)	26.2 (79.2)	23.9 (75.0)	19.7 (67.5)	16.0 (60.8)	13.5 (56.3)	12.9 (55.2)	13.9 (57.0)	16.0 (60.8)	18.9 (66.0)	20.7 (69.3)	23.4 (74.1)	19.2 (66.6)
Mean daily minimum °C (°F)	12.5 (54.5)	13.2 (55.8)	11.6 (52.9)	9.0 (48.2)	6.6 (43.9)	4.8 (40.6)	3.8 (38.8)	5.0 (41.0)	6.2 (43.2)	8.0 (46.4)	9.4 (48.9)	10.9 (51.6)	8.4 (47.2)
Record low °C (°F)	3.9 (39.0)	3.3 (37.9)	1.8 (35.2)	−1.6 (29.1)	−0.9 (30.4)	−3.4 (25.9)	−3.7 (25.3)	−3.5 (25.7)	−1.6 (29.1)	−0.9 (30.4)	1.2 (34.2)	2.8 (37.0)	−3.7 (25.3)
Average precipitation mm (inches)	60.6 (2.39)	52.4 (2.06)	67.9 (2.67)	82.9 (3.26)	93.8 (3.69)	92.1 (3.63)	91.2 (3.59)	102.2 (4.02)	103.8 (4.09)	105.8 (4.17)	88.7 (3.49)	79.4 (3.13)	1,020.2 (40.17)
Average precipitation days (≥ 0.2 mm)	8.4	7.2	9.9	12.3	14.6	15.4	16.4	16.8	15.5	14.5	12.5	10.4	153.9
Source: Bureau of Meteorology (1962-1979 normals & extremes, rainfall 1888-2015)

== Events ==
Warragul is the major township closest to Lardner, the home of the Gippsland Field Days. Three major events are held at Lardner Park each year—the Farm World agricultural show, Trucks in Action, and Harvest of Gippsland. The Farm World agricultural show is a major drawcard for the Warragul area. Every year in late March, Warragul plays host to these Field Days at Lardner Park. The Field Days are Australia's premier mixed farming Field Days and they include one of Australia's most diverse ranges of beef cattle, dairying and horticulture exhibits.

Warragul is also home to the annual Warragul Show, which is held on the first Friday of March each year. It is traditionally a farming and livestock show, but includes rides, stalls, games, fireworks and showbags. It is held at the Warragul showgrounds.

== Education ==
For a town of its size, Warragul has a large education industry with four primary schools, three secondary schools and two tertiary institutions.

=== Primary schools ===
Both Warragul Primary (opened in 1879) and Warragul North Primary (opened c.1954) are state primary schools, St. Joseph's Catholic Primary Warragul and St. Angela's of the Cross are Catholic schools, and St. Paul's Anglican Grammar School is an Anglican Church of Australia (formerly Church of England) primary school.

Warragul & District Specialist School is a junior school that focuses on educating children aged 5 to 10 years of age. The school uses a series of teaching tools such as PECS (Picture Exchange Communication System) and AUSLAN.

=== Secondary schools ===
There are three secondary schools in Warragul, these include Warragul Regional College, Marist-Sion College and St Paul's Anglican Grammar School. Warragul Regional College was formed in 1994 from the merger of Warragul High School and Warragul Secondary College. Marist-Sion College was formed in 1975 as a result of the merger between the Marist Brothers Boys College and the Our Lady of Sion Girls College. St. Paul's Anglican Grammar School was formed in 1982 with just nineteen year 7 students and has grown quite significantly in recent years.

=== Tertiary institutions ===
The Central Gippsland Institute of TAFE has a campus located to the south of the CBD adjacent to the railway station. The Education Centre Gippsland has recently taken over the courses previously provided by the McMillan Institute of Land and Food Resources, a former campus of the University of Melbourne. The courses offered encompass the areas of agriculture, equine management, harness racing, horticulture and conservation and land management. A Monash University campus located in close proximity to the public hospital (West Gippsland Healthcare Group) provides clinical training and rural placements for medical students as part of Monash Rural Health.

== Transport ==
Warragul railway station is a staffed V/Line station located to the south of the Warragul CBD. The railway station is situated on the Gippsland railway line, which services the towns and suburbs between Bairnsdale and Southern Cross.

Warragul has a modest bus network consisting of four routes within the town's boundaries. Each route has a frequency of three services a day. There are also bus services to neighbouring towns. The Warragul bus network was recently upgraded with the Myki technology, fitted to all town buses. This ticketing system has been implemented on the V/Line Train services during 2014–15.

== Sport ==
Gippsland United FC was founded in 1963 and represents the town in soccer, playing in the Victorian State League Division 1 South East, making it the highest ranked soccer team in the entire Gippsland region.

Despite taking 22 years to win their first Latrobe Valley Soccer League title, the club won the league seven times between 1985 and 2001 before departing for the Metropolitan league - them winning five promotions to rise from provincial obscurity to the brink of NPL Victoria. The club was known as Warragul United until a 2022 merger with Gippsland FC and Latrobe Women's FC created Gippsland United FC.

The Warragul Warriors are the representative teams of the Warragul and District Amateur Basketball Association. They have a long history of success, most recently winning the Gippsland and State titles in the Country Basketball League.

The town has an Australian rules football team competing in the Gippsland Football League, the Warragul Football Club, and another, the Warragul Industrials, competing in the Ellinbank & District Football League.

The Warragul & District Junior Football League caters for younger Australian rules footballers, with three teams based in Warragul: the Colts, Warranor (at Eastern Park) & the Blues (at Marist-Sion College ). The WDJFL has three competitions, consisting of the under-10s, under-12s and the Under-14½s.

The Warragul Little Athletics Centre meets on Saturdays throughout the summer season at the Geoff Watt Memorial Track, Burke Street, Warragul. It caters for young athletes in age groups ranging from Under 6 through to Under 17. As well as competing locally, athletes are able to contest Regional and State Championships in Track & Field as well as Relay Championships and Multi-Events.

Warragul's Wild Dog Triathlon Club also meets on Saturdays throughout the summer season for a swim/cycle/run event. The club caters for all ages and abilities with Junior, Under 14, Fun Tri, Super-Sprint, A Grade and B Grade categories. Weekly competition commences at the clubrooms opposite the indoor pool in Burke Street, Warragul.

Warragul Harness Racing Club conducts regular meetings at its racetrack in the town.

The Warragul Greyhound Racing Club holds regular greyhound racing meetings at the Logan Park Showgrounds. The track opened on 14 September 1956.

Golfers play at the course of the Warragul Country Club on Sutton Street.

Warragul possesses one of the best outdoor velodromes in the state and is serviced by the Warragul Cycling Club (WCC), which runs road races most Saturdays on the outskirts of the town.

The club hosts the Baw Baw Classic road race, held early each April. This race features one of the hardest climbs in the country and has been won by riders such as 2000 Cyclist of the year, Dave McKenzie, Tour de France Stage Winner, Simon Gerrans and 2009 Australian Road Champion, Peter McDonald.

== Local media ==
=== Newspapers ===
Warragul has two weekly local newspapers, The Warragul and Drouin Gazette and a free publication, The West Gippsland Trader. According to the Warragul Regional Newspapers website, The Gazette and The Trader are distributed to locations from as far as Pakenham to Moe and from Poowong to Noojee, covering over 40,000 readers.

Warragul also has a free twice-monthly print and online newspaper, the Warragul & Baw Baw Citizen. The Warragul Citizen was established in 2011 as a quarterly print paper before becoming bi-monthly in 2012, covering Warragul, Drouin and Yarragon. The paper's online news offering started in late 2011 and covers all of Baw Baw. The paper moved to being online-only in 2013, printing the last physical edition of its original run in February. In 2014 the paper announced it would return to print with monthly editions from 11 July, changing the name to Warragul & Baw Baw Citizen in the process.

The West Gippsland Gazette was published from 1898 to 1930 in Warragul; it has been digitised and is available on Trove.

=== Radio ===
Warragul has two commercial radio stations, 531 3GG and 94.3 Triple M Gippsland. 3GG commenced in 1937, then known as 3UL. It changed its name to 3GG in 1989. Triple M Gippsland commenced broadcasting in 2002. Initially known as Sea FM and later Star FM and Hit FM.

Warragul also receives the Drouin-based West Gippsland Community Radio, 103.1 3BBR FM.

Warragul has community radio station for print disability, Vision Australia Radio Warragul broadcasts on 93.5FM.

The radio reception available in Warragul includes many of the Melbourne commercial stations (such as 105.1 Triple M, Smooth 91.5, 3AW 693, Nova 100), ABC Broadcasters (774 ABC Melbourne, 96.7 Triple J and 100.7 ABC Gippsland) and Gippsland commercial stations based further east in Traralgon (99.5 TRFM and Gold 1242).

== Military history ==
During World War II, Warragul was the location of RAAF No.2 Inland Aircraft Fuel Depot (IAFD), completed in 1942 and closed on 14 June 1944. Usually consisting of four tanks, 31 fuel depots were built across Australia for the storage and supply of aircraft fuel for the Royal Australian Air Force and the United States Army Air Forces at a total cost of £900,000 ($1,800,000).

== Notable people ==
- Gary Ayres – Former coach of the Adelaide Crows Football Club and former Hawthorn premiership player
- Robert Baldry – Former Victoria cricket team cricket player
- Jason Bargwanna – V8 Supercar driver and 2000 Bathurst 1000 winner
- William Kinsey Bolton CBE VD (1860–1941) – Soldier
- Travis Demsey – Former drummer of The Living End
- Andrew Dent AM – Doctor and humanitarian worker
- Dick Ellis – MI6 intelligence officer and author
- Smacka Fitzgibbon – Jazz musician
- Graeme Gahan – Former Richmond footballer
- Chris Godsil – Professor of Mathematics at the University of Waterloo, Ontario, Canada
- Edward 'Carjie' Greeves – First Brownlow Medallist and Geelong footballer
- John Guy – Leading British historian and biographer
- Trent Hotton – Former Collingwood and Carlton AFL footballer
- Craig Hutchison – TV personality on the Nine Network and Triple M radio personality
- Margaret Jackson AC (1953–present) – Australian corporate executive (former Chairman of QANTAS)
- Walter Langcake – woodcarver and sculptor
- Harry McKay – AFL footballer
- Ben McKay – AFL footballer
- Bob Murphy – Former player & captain of the Western Bulldogs in the AFL
- Alan Noonan – Former VFL footballer for the Essendon Football Club and the Richmond Football Club
- Andrew T. O'Connor – Australian novelist
- Luke O'Dea – Soccer player with Melbourne Victory in the Hyundai A-League
- Mark Ridgway – Former Tasmanian Tigers cricket player
- Lionel Rose MBE (1948–2011) – Former bantamweight world boxing champion (honoured by life-size bronze statue in Queen Street Park)
- Barry Round – Footscray (Western Bulldogs) and Sydney Swans Brownlow Medallist
- Caleb Serong – AFL footballer
- Jayden Warn – Wheelchair rugby gold medallist at the 2016 Rio Paralympics
- Geoff Watt – Former long-distance runner and namesake of the local athletics track
- Kathy Watt – Australia's first cycling gold medallist at the 1992 Barcelona Summer Olympics in the women's road race. She also won a silver medal in the 3000m individual pursuit event at these Olympic games
