= List of Gippsland Football League premiers =

== History ==
The original Gippsland Football League was formed when the Northern Gippsland Football Association (NGFA) officially changed their name to “The Gippsland Football League” in 1921, which then operated under this title until 1953.

A new Gippsland football competition was formed in 1954, as the La Trobe Valley Football League, when seven club's from the Central Gippsland Football League joined the Latrobe Valley Football League, with the three remaining Central Gippsland Football League club's joining the South Gippsland Football League.

== Football Premierships ==
The following is a list of all the Gippsland FL premiership winning teams from 1921 to 1953 and of the La Trobe FL from 1954 to present day.

The Reserves competition commenced in 1954, the Thirds competition in 1957 and the Fourths in 2000.

Year	Seniors	Reserves	Under 18's	Under 16's
	Gippsland FL		-	
1921	Maffra*		-	
1922	Rosedale		-	
1923	Traralgon		-	
1924	Sale		-	
1925	Traralgon		-	
1926	Maffra		-	
1927	Sale		-	
1928	Bairnsdale		-	
1929	Bairnsdale		-	
1930	Bairnsdale		-	
1931	Sale		-	
1932	Yallourn		-	
1933	Yallourn		-	
1934	Sale		-	
1935	Maffra		-	
1936	Yarram		-	
1937	Sale		-	
1938	Maffra		-	
1939	Yarram		-	
1940	GFL in recess. WWII			
1941	GFL in recess. WWII		-	
1942	GFL in recess. WWII		-	
1943	GFL in recess. WWII		-	
1944	GFL in recess. WWII		-	
1945	GFL in recess. WWII		-	
1946	Maffra Blacks		-	
1947	Bairnsdale		-	
1948	Maffra		-	
1949	Sale		-	
1950	Sale		-	
1951	Bairnsdale		-	
1952	Bairnsdale		-	
1953	Sale		-	
	La Trobe Valley FL		-	
1954	Sale	Traralgon	-	
1955	Sale	Warragul	-	
1956	Moe	Sale	-	
1957	Sale	Sale	Traralgon &	
			Sale (Co-Premiers)	
1958	Trafalgar	Sale	Morwell	
1959	Sale	Moe	Moe	
1960	Traralgon	Morwell	St Pat's	
1961	Morwell	Morwell	St Pat's A	
1962	Trafalgar	Traralgon	St Pat's A	
1963	Traralgon	Traralgon	St Pat's A	
1964	Traralgon	Traralgon	St Pat's A	
1965	Traralgon	Traralgon	St Pat's A	
1966	Morwell	Bairnsdale	Sale	
1967	Moe	Moe	St Pat's A	
1968	Traralgon	Moe	Sale	
1969	Traralgon	Sale	St Pat's A	
1970	Leongatha	Sale	St Pat's A	
1971	Sale	Sale	St Pat's A	
1972	Traralgon	Sale	St Pat's A	
1973	Sale	Morwell	Traralgon	
1974	Warragul	Warragul	St Pat's A	
1975	Sale	Traralgon	St Pat's A	
1976	Warragul	Traralgon	Sale	
1977	Leongatha	Traralgon	Sale	
1978	Traralgon	Traralgon	Leongatha	
1979	Leongatha	Leongatha	Warragul	
1980	Traralgon	Traralgon	Traralgon	
1981	Bairnsdale	Traralgon	Warragul	
1982	Leongatha	Traralgon	Warragul	
1983	Morwell	Bairnsdale	Maffra	
1984	Warragul	Warragul	Sale	
1985	Morwell	Traralgon	Warragul	
1986	Sale	Traralgon	Bairnsdale	
1987	Traralgon	Traralgon	Bairnsdale	
1988	Morwell	Traralgon	Traralgon	
1989	Leongatha	Traralgon	Traralgon	
1990	Traralgon	Maffra	Sale	
1991	Traralgon	Maffra	Moe	
1992	Traralgon	Traralgon	Traralgon	
1993	Morwell	Traralgon	Sale	
1994	Traralgon	Morwell	Sale	
1995	Leongatha	Traralgon	Bairnsdale	
1996	Morwell	Warragul	Traralgon	
1997	Leongatha	Leongatha	Sale	
1998	Traralgon	Sale	Sale	
1999	Traralgon	Traralgon	Sale	
2000	Traralgon	Leongatha	Traralgon	Leongatha
2001	Leongatha	Maffra	Sale	Traralgon
2002	Maffra	Maffra	Leongatha	Traralgon
2003	Maffra	Maffra	Traralgon	Sale
2004	Maffra	Maffra	Maffra	Sale
2005	Traralgon	Traralgon	Sale	Sale
2006	Maffra	Sale	Traralgon	Warragul
2007	Maffra	Traralgon	Trarlagon	Maffra
2008	Sale	Traralgon	Traralgon	Traralgon
2009	Maffra	Traralgon	Maffra	Traralgon
2010	Maffra	Traralgon	Leongatha	Traralgon
2011	Traralgon	Maffra	Traralgon	Sale
2012	Sale	Leongatha	Bairnsdale	Traralgon
2013	Morwell	Wonthaggi	Bairnsdale	Sale
2014	Morwell	Traralgon	Traralgon	Moe
2015	Traralgon	Maffra	Traralgon	Traralgon
2016	Maffra	Traralgon	Bairnsdale	Moe
2017	Leongatha	Morwell	Traralgon	Moe
2018	Leongatha	Leongatha	Traralgon	Bairnsdale
2019	Maffra	Maffra	Leongatha	Traralgon
2022	Leongatha	Leongatha	Warragul	Maffra
Year	Seniors	Reserves	Under 18's	Under 16's

== Notes ==
- 1921 - Maffra were undefeated premiers

== Links ==
- 1931 - Gippsland FL: Maffra & Traralgon team photos
- 1931 - Gippsland FL Premiers: Sale FC team photo
- 1934 - Gippsland FL Premiers: Sale FC team photo
- 1936 - Gippsland FL Premiers: Yarram FC team photo
- 1937 - Gippsland FL Grand Final team photos
- 1949 - Gippsland FL Grand Final team photos
- 1952 - Gippsland FL Premiers: Bairnsdale FC team photo
