= Robert Baldry =

Australian cricketer (born 1950)

Personal information
- Born: 30 November 1950 (age 75); Melbourne, Australia

Domestic team information
- Years: Team
- 1972-1977: Victoria
- Source: Cricinfo, 5 December 2015

Robert Baldry (born 30 November 1950) is an Australian former cricketer. He played 26 first-class cricket matches for Victoria between 1972 and 1977.

Baldry played 152 games for Collingwood Cricket Club in the Melbourne's District Cricket Competition between 1967/68 and 1980/81.

== See also ==
- List of Victoria first-class cricketers
