= Geoff Collins (Australian rules footballer) =

Australian rules footballer

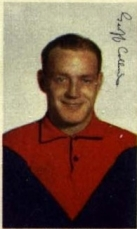

Personal information
- Full name: Geoffrey Anthony Collins
- Born: 10 August 1926; Kew, Victoria
- Died: 14 August 2005 (aged 79)
- Height: 178 cm (5 ft 10 in)
- Weight: 76 kg (168 lb)

Playing career^{1}
Years	Club	Games (Goals)
1948–1952, 1954	Melbourne	88 (5)
- ^{1} Playing statistics correct to the end of 1954.

Career highlights
- VFL premiership: 1948; Melbourne captain: 1954

Geoffrey Anthony Collins (10 August 1926 – 14 August 2005) was an Australian rules football player in the Victorian Football League (VFL).

Geoff Collins played in the Melbourne premiership team of 1948, and again in the losing 1954 Grand Final side.

== War service ==
Collins served in the Korean War as a fighter pilot, flying Gloster Meteor jets with 77 Squadron RAAF between 1 January and 14 August 1953.
