= Warragul Football Club =

Australian rules football and netball club

Warragul

Names
- Full name: Warragul Football and Netball Club
- Nickname: Gulls

Club details
- Founded: 1879; 147 years ago
- Colours
- Competition: Gippsland League
- President: Chris Blackwood
- Coach: Steven Kidd
- Premierships: (4): 1974, 1976, 1984, 2003
- Ground: Western Park Warragul; 38°09′12″S 145°55′16″E

Uniforms
Home	Away

Other information
- Official website: www.warragulfnc.sportingpulse.net

The Warragul Football and Netball Club, nicknamed the Gulls, is an Australian rules football and netball club based in the city of the same name in the state of Victoria.

The club teams currently compete in the Gippsland League, fielding Senior, Reserve, Under 18 and Under 16 football teams, as well as A, B, C Grade and Under 17, Under 15 and Under 13 netball teams.

== History ==
The club was formed in 1879 by William Paul and its first games were played against other local football clubs including Drouin, Buln Buln, Morwell, Traralgon and Berwick.

Warragul had a successful run at the commencement of official football competitions in Gippsland, winning six Challenge Cups (premierships) between 1889 and 1897.

In 1894, Warragul footballer, Andrew Watson, died of internal injuries after a match in Bunyip on Saturday, 2 June 1894.

The Warragul Half Holiday Football Club was formed in 1894, wearing the colours - all blue guernsey, with blue and white stockings.

In 1922 Warragul, Central Gippsland FA Premiers defeated Rosedale, North Gippsland FA Premiers in a challenge match in October to win the unofficial title of "Gippsland Premiers"!

Warragul's guernsey was originally black with a red Yoke, until 2000 when the guernsey was changed to the current colours of teal, white, red and black.
The 'Gulls' have had a proud history especially through the successful years of the early 1920s, 1970s and 1980s.

Lean seasons in 1998 and 1999 in the Gippsland/Latrobe FL, saw the club transfer to the West Gippsland FL, with the thought of providing a better chance of retaining players. The Victorian Country Football League provided this clearance for the Gulls to the WGFL, where they played from 2000 to 2004. However, the merging of the GLFL and WGFL saw Warragul resume its battles with former foes from 2005.

Since 2005, the club has been a part of the Gippsland FL, competing against clubs such as Bairnsdale, Drouin, Garfield (until their transfer to the EDFL), Moe, Morwell, Traralgon, Maffra, Sale, Wonthaggi and Leongatha.

In 2010 and 2011, Warragul finished bottom of the ladder, winning only one game in each respective season. The club is currently building a young base of players to build on into the future, many of whom had success with the club in both the Under 16 and 18's previously.

== Football Leagues Timeline ==
- 1889: South Gippsland Challenge Cup
- 1890: Robinson's Challenge Cup
- 1891: Kennedy's Challenge Cup
- 1892: Gippsland & Feilchenfeld Cup
- 1893: Thomas Challenge Cup
- 1894: Ross Challenge Cup
- 1895: Storie Challenge Cup
- 1896: ?
- 1897: Harlem Hotel Cup
- 1898-1908: West Gippsland FA
- 1909-1915: Central Gippsland FL
- 1916-1918: No Football Played. World War I
- 1919-1921: Central & West Gippsland FA
- 1922-1940: Central Gippsland FL
- 1941-1945: Club in recess. World War II
- 1946-1953: Central Gippsland FL
- 1954-1994: La Trobe Valley FL
- 1995-1999: Gippsland-La Trobe FL
- 2000-2004: West Gippsland Latrobe FL (Western Division)
- 2005-2009: West Gippsland Latrobe Football League (Premier Division)
- 2010–2019: Gippsland Football League
- 2020: Club in recess: COVID-19
- 2021-present: Gippsland Football League

== Gulls Football Premierships ==
SENIORS:

- South Gippsland Challenge Cup
  - 1889 (undefeated)
- Kennedy's Challenge Cup
  - 1890 (undefeated)
- Robinson's Challenge Cup
  - 1891
- Thomas Challenge Cup
  - 1893
- Ross Challenge Cup
  - 1894
- Harlem Challenge Cup
  - 1897
- West Gippsland Football Association
  - 1900
  - 1907
- Central Gippsland Football Association
  - 1922
  - 1927
  - 1932
  - 1938
- LaTrobe Valley Football League
  - 1974, 1976, 1984
- West Gippsland Latrobe FL (Western Division)
  - 2003

RESERVES:

- Central Gippsland Football League
  - 1946, 1947, 1951, 1953
- La Trobe Valley Football League
  - 1974, 1984, 1996

THIRDS:

- 1979, 1981, 1982, 1985, 2004

FOURTHS:

- 2003, 2004, 2006

JUNIORS:

- Drouin Junior Football Association
  - 1910
- Central Gippsland Football Association
  - 1922

== Gulls Leading Goalkickers ==
LVFL / GLFL / WGLFL / GFL Leading Goalkickers
Year	Seniors	Reserves	Thirds (U/18)
1951	Charles Vanderbist (67)		
1955	K.Caudwell (63)		
1959	Jim McGrath (55)		
1960	Jim McGrath (59)		
1964	Alan Noonan (54)		
1968		M.Vagg (45)	
1972		W.Best (42)	
1976	A.Singline (64)		
1982			B.Nott (47)
1988			Paul Hughes (52)
1989	Simon Byrne (70)		
2004			Matthew Gooden (73)
2014			Harry McKay (47)

== Gulls Football League Best and Fairest Winners ==
LVFL / GLFL / WGLFL / GFL Best and Fairest Winners
Years	Seniors	Reserves	Thirds (U/18)	Fourths (U/16)
1932	Harry Andrews			
1935	Arthur “Arty” Duncan			
1955		Ron Hayes		
1963		Ron Serong		
1967			Robert Baldry	
1975	John Gallus			
1979		Allan Light	A.Morrison	
1984			Graeme Rankin	
1994	Andrew Pratt			
1996	David Mills		Scott Jinks	
2000				Nick Humphrey
2001		Darren McDonald		
2006	Desi Barr			
2012			Chris Carey	
2016	Brad Scalzo			

== Club Life Members ==
Life Members who have contributed greatly to support the success of the Warragul Football/Netball Club

Maurie Reeves, Robert Ballingall, Alan Walkinshaw, Bruce Nicholl, Robert Vaughan, Anthony Nott, Hugh Bingham, Claire Henshall, William Best, Tom Malady, Kevin Mills, John Heenan, Neville McDonough, Colin McKenzie, Dorothy Carland, Michael Waters, Audrey Ray, Michael Vick, Alan Glen, Bryan Fitzpatrick, Ray Waters, Ray Cropley, Ray Costelloe, Gary Olsson, Graeme Gahan, Rod Pollock, Betty Nott, Julie Pollock, Jim Johnson, Neil Stapleton, Kevin Collis, John Shiels, Noel Gleeson, Ann Nott, Tony Flack, Arlene Bible.

== VFL/AFL Players ==
The following list notes current and former VFL/AFL players that have played with the Warragul Football Club prior to making their VFL / AFL debut.

- 1898 - Johnny Coghlan (Melbourne)
- 1907 - Horrie Farmer (St Kilda)
- 1908 - Alex Dunstan (Collingwood)
- 1911 - Norm Brooker (Richmond)
- 1919 - Bert Taylor (Fitzroy)
- 1921 - Harry Watson (Fitzroy)
- 1921 - Les Wallace (Melbourne)
- 1926 - Harry Weidner (Richmond)
- 1933 - George Batson (St. Kilda)
- 1939 - Noel Price (Fitzroy)
- 1939 - Alan Fields (Fitzroy)
- 1942 - George Hoskins (Fitzroy)
- 1947 - Pat Twomey (Collingwood)
- 1952 - Geoff Williams (Geelong)
- 1953 - Maurie Reeves (Melbourne)
- 1953 - Jim Cusack (Fitzroy)
- 1953 - Wally Nash (Hawthorn)
- 1961 - Robert Hickman (Richmond)
- 1963 - John Murton (Collingwood)
- 1966 - Alan Noonan (Essendon)
- 1966 - Graham Croft (St. Kilda)
- 1968 - Barry Round (Footscray, Sydney)
- 1969 - Bruce Davidson (Footscray)
- 1971 - Graeme G. Cook (Footscray)
- 1974 - Gerry Lynn - (Hawthorn)
- 1978 - Gary Ayres (Hawthorn)
- 1992 - Ashley Green (Essendon, Brisbane)
- 1994 - Trent Hotton (Collingwood & Carlton)
- 1997 - Matthew Watson (Essendon)
- 2000 - Robert Murphy (Western Bulldogs)
- 2011 - Michael Ross (Essendon)
- 2020 - Caleb Serong (Fremantle)
- 2022 - Jai Serong (Hawthorn)
- 2024 - Lachlan Smith (Western Bulldogs)

== Senior Football Results ==
Year	Wins	Losses	%	Points	Position	Coach	B&F	Notes
2021								
2020								GFNL in recess. COVID-19
2019	5	13	66.93%	20	10th			
2018	9	9	93.17%	36	6th			
2017	7	11	82.11%	28	7th			
2016	9	9	89.49%	36	4th			
2015	2	16	40.59%	8	10th			
2014	2	16	23.92%	8	9th			
2013	6	12	77.53%	24	8th	Ash Green		New coach, Ash Green
2012	5	13	64.19%	12	10th	George Morgan/ Justin Cant	Mark Bradley	5 wins, with 3 in last 6 games
2011	1	17	53.19%	4	10th	George Morgan	Mark Bradley	Win against Leongatha
2010	1	15	38.04%	4	9th	Peter Fusinato	Joel Morgan	Win against Wonthaggi. Last game by 1 point
2009	4	12	75.06%	16	7th	Peter Fusinato	Ryan Davey	
2008	11	5	--	44	3rd	Steve Carey	Ryan Davey/Mat Gray	Minor Premier. Defeated by Morwell in Premilinary

== Reserves & Under 18 ==
Reserves	W	L	%	Pts	Pos.	Under 18	W	L	%	Pts	Pos.
2012	2	14	42.79%	8	8th	2012	15	3	217.60%	60	Runners Up
2011	0	18	33.03%	0	10th	2011	7	9	73.54%	28	4th
2010	0	16	16.38%	0	9th	2010	8 (1 Draw)	7	109.93%	34	3rd
2009	8 (1 Draw)	7	162.56%	34	6th	2009	9	5	163.56%	32	Runners Up
2008	9	7	--	36	5th	2008	14	2	--	56	Runners Up

== Under 16's ==
Under 16	W	L	%	Pts	Pos.
2012	5	13	45.94%	20	7th
2011	4	13	31.41%	16	8th
2010	8	8	125.37%	32	3rd
2009	5	11	70.14%	20	7th
2008	7	9	--	28	6th

Grand Final Appearances

- 2012 Under 18 Grand Final
  Grand Final | at Morwell
  WARRAGUL 8.6.54
  def by
  BAIRNSDALE 8.12.60
- 2009 Under 18 Grand Final
  Grand Final | at Morwell
  WARRAGUL 8.11.59
  def by
  MAFFRA 12.6.78
- 2008 Under 18 Grand Final
  Grand Final | at Traralgon
  WARRAGUL 4.4 28
  def by
  TRARALGON 7.7 49
- 2006 Under 16 Grand Final
  Grand Final | at Traralgon
  WARRAGUL 9.13 67
  def
  TRARALGON 5.12 42

== Netball: 2007 to 2012 ==
2012	W	L	%		2011	W	L	%		2010	W	L	%	
A Grade	0 (1 Draw)	15	59.43	10th	A Grade	1	17	44.03	10th	A Grade	6	8	75.06	5th
B Grade	0	18	55.49	10th	B Grade	1	17	38.99	9th	B Grade	1	15	49.33	8th
C Grade	4	14	49.42	8th	C Grade	3	15	58.49	9th	C Grade	1 (1 Draw)	14	35.84	8th
Under 17	1	17	29.59	10th	Under 17	1	17	24.65	9th	Under 17	6	10	82.46	6th
Under 15	2 (2 Draws)	13	56.55	8th	Under 15	2	16	27.49	9th	Under 15	2 (2 Draws)	12	50.55	12th
Under 13	8	10	90.82	7th	Under 13	3	15	40.53	9th	Under 13	1	14	40.75	9th

2009	W	L	%		2008	W	L	%		2007	W	L	%	
A Grade	6	8	119.24	5th	A Grade	6	10		6th	A Grade	12	4	125.26	2nd
B Grade	2	17	56.95	9th	B Grade	7	9		6th	B Grade	10	6	118.54	3rd
C Grade	9	7	124.48	5th	C Grade	5	10		6th	C Grade	12 (1 Draw)	3	138.60	3rd
Under 17	10	6	96.72	3rd	Under 17	6 (2 Draws)	8		5th	Under 17	10 (1 Draw)	5	135.85	3rd
Under 15	8	8	93.28	5th	Under 15	10 (2 Draws)	4		2nd	Under 15	12	4	198.36	2nd
Under 13	6	10	50.66	5th	Under 13	7 (1 Draw)	8		5th	Under 13	4 (1 Draw)	11	95.72	6th
