= Sunraysia Football League =

Australian rules football and netball competition

Sunraysia Football Netball League
- Current season, competition or edition: 2026
- Association: AFL Victoria
- Sport: Australian rules football Netball
- Founded: 1945; 81 years ago
- CEO: Jason Tourney
- President: Trevor Heaft
- Motto: "Where community sports thrive"
- No. of teams: 198: 18 (senior football); 63 (junior football); 36 (senior netball); 81 (junior netball)
- Country: Australia
- Most recent champion: List: Seniors: Imperials Reserves: Irymple U/18's: Irymple U/16's: Irymple U/14's: Sth Mildura U/13's: Football Club U/12's: Football Club U/10.A : Football Club U/10.B: Football Club A. Grade: Ouyen United B. Grade: Wentworth C. Grade: Irymple C. Reserve:Wentworth 17 Under/ Div 1: Mildura 17 Under/Div 2:Ouyen United 15 Under/Div 1:Irymple 15 Under/Div 2:Robinvale Euston 13 Under/Div 1:Ouyen United 13 Under/Div 2:Irymple; (2024)
- Most titles: Seniors: Imperials (20); A. Grade: Imperials (12)
- Website: sunraysiafnl.com.au

The Sunraysia Football and Netball League (SFNL) is an Australian rules football and netball competition in the Sunraysia district of north-west Victoria and south-west New South Wales.

== History ==
The Sunraysia Football League was formed in 1945, after World War Two, which superseded the Mildura Football League.

In 1947, Melbourne: 23.18 - 156 defeated the Sunraysia FL: 8.16 - 64 at the Mildura Recreation Oval.

In 1948, Imperials FC finished last on the ladder, then went onto win the 1949 premiership.

In June 1949, Collingwood: 19.14 - 128 defeated the Sunraysia FL: 13.6 - 84.

In 1957, Curlwaa-Wentworth and Coomealla merged to form Wentworth & Districts Football Club.

Between 1951 and 1960, Mildura played in nine grand finals in ten years, winning five premierships, with former Essendon player, Les Griggs coaching the team between 1950 and 1956.

In 1965, Irymple FC finished last on the ladder, then went onto win the 1966 SFL premiership.

Between 1967 and 1986, the Sunraysia Football League was Richmond's rural VFL zoning area and provided Richmond with many good players and a period of premiership success and regular finals appearances in the late 1960's, 1970's and early 1980's.

Imperials FNC had a very successful period between 1986 and 1996, playing in 10 grand finals in 11 years, which included two lots of five consecutive grand finals. The only year Imperials missed the grand final was in 1991, when they lost the preliminary final.

Under the coaching of former VFL star player, Merv Neagle, Merbein won senior football premierships in 2002 and 2003, but have since struggled to be regular finalists.

The SFNL is considered a major country league. The league's grand final was traditionally played at City Oval in Mildura, however from 2022 it has played at the newly-opened Mildura Sporting Precinct in Mildura's South.

In 2023, Imperials FNC finished last (9th) on the senior football ladder, then went onto win the 2024 premiership.

Mildura Football Association

Australian Rules football has been active in Sunraysia since the formation of the Mildura Football Club in 1888, with Mildura finishing on top of the ladder in the first recorded, local Australian Rules competition, the Mildura Football Association in 1891.

In 1891, Mildura FC received the Jamieson Premiership Cup, while "Best All-round Player" went to "Dot" Desailly (South Mildura) and best goalkicker award was won by W. "Bill" Bartlett (North Mildura).

There was no official competition football in 1896, as there was only two active football clubs, Irymple and North Mildura, with Wentworth Imperials FC showing some interest in joining the competition, which did not go ahead, but some friendly matches were played between these clubs.

Between 1900 and 1903, there are no newspapers references to any Australian Rules football competitions in or around the Mildura area, which was partially due to player shortages from enlistments in the Army who served Australia in the Second Boer War. There is no evidence of local football in The Mildura Cultivator newspaper until 1904. In February, 1904, there was a push get the Mildura Recreation Reserve "into immediate use and proper order" to get the games of cricket and football going again, like the good old days.

Mildura Football League

In 1904, the Mildura Football League was formed from the following teams - Irymple, Mildura and the Mildura Fire Brigade, with the Fire Brigade defeating Irymple in the grand final.

In 1907, the Fire Brigade FC disbanded and was reformed as the Mildura Rovers FC and the club initially wore a red and white guernsey and blue knickers.

In 1919, East Mildura and West Mildura Football Club's were formed when the town of Mildura was divided up into zoning areas for players to be zoned to a certain club, depending where the player lived.

In 1921, the Mildura Football League was re-formed from the following teams - Irymple, Merbein, Mildura, North Cliffs and Red Cliffs, with a new committee of management. The official new club colours were - Irymple: blue and gold jerseys and socks, blue shorts; Merbein: black and white jerseys and socks, white shorts; Mildura: black and red jerseys and socks, white shorts; Red Cliff: maroon and royal blue jerseys and socks, white shorts; Red Cliffs North: cardinal and black jerseys and socks, white shorts.

In a golden era for the town of Merbein, between 1924 and 1938, Merbein and / or South Merbein played in 16 consecutive Mildura FL grand finals, with Merbein winning seven premierships and South Merbein winning six premierships.

In 1925, Merbein Park was changed to the Kenny Memorial Park in honour of the late E J Kenny, for all the work Mr Kenny performed in Merbein as the "Father" of the Merbein settlement.

In 1927, the Mildura Rovers Junior FC (Under 18 side) wore "white knicks, dark blue guernsey, with a yellow sash".

In August 1927, Mildura FL: 11.10 - 76 defeated Essendon Reserves: 6.8 - 44.

In September 1936, St Kilda 14.18 - 102 defeated the Mildura Football League 11.20 - 86, with St Kilda's Bill Mohr kicking 10 goals.

In 1937, the Mildura FC disbanded and the Mildura Working Man's Club entered a team in the Mildura FL.

In 1938, Laurie Leask won the 1938 Mildura Football League / Sunraysia Daily newspaper best and fairest award, the Snow Trophy.

In September 1938, Essendon Reserves: 16.17 - 113 defeated the Mildura Football League: 16.16 - 112 in a closely contested match decided by one point.

In 1940, because of World War Two, the Mildura & DFL was reduced to a six team competition between the Imperials, Irymple, Merbein, Red Cliffs, Wentworth and Workers, with the season shortened, the grand final was played in June.

Mildura Boys Football Association

In April 1946, the Sunraysia Boys Football Association was formed with an Under 18 division and an Under 16 division from the following teams - Coomealla, Curlwaa, Gol Gol, Irymple, Merbein, Mildura Community Centre, Mildura Convent, Mildura High School, Methodists, Red Cliffs Community Centre and Wentworth.

Mildura Wednesday Football Association

The Mildura Wednesday FA was formed in 1921 and initially comprised the following three clubs - Fitzroys (Maroon), Imperials (blue and white) and Tigers (yellow and black). In 1929, C Whitmore (Mildura Rovers) won the MWFA best and fairest award.

Timeline

- 1891 - 1895: Mildura Football Association
- 1896 - MFA in recess
- 1897 - 1899: Mildura Football Association
- 1900 - 1903: MFA in recess due to Australia in the Second Boer War
- 1904 - 1915: Mildura Football League
- 1916 - 1918: MFL in recess due to World War One
- 1919 - 1940: Mildura Football League
- 1941 - 1943: MFL in recess due to World War Two
- 1944 - Mildura Football League. Newspapers reports sometimes referred to the local football competition as the Mildura & District Football League and occasionally the Mildura Football Association between 1904 and 1944, but it was mostly referred to as the Mildura Football League during this period.
- 1945 - 2019: Sunraysia Football League
- 2020 - SFNL in recess due to COVID-19 pandemic in Victoria. 2021 season was cut short due to COVID-19 pandemic in Victoria and no finals series was played.
- 2021 - 2025: Sunraysia Football League

Stance on Violence

Irymple Football Club is working with Kim O'Reilly to educate players around healthy relationships and violence against women. O'Reilly was seriously assaulted by former Irymple player Jake Frecker in January 2018.

Irymple Club president Dennis Mitchell called for football clubs to change their culture around violence, condemning the support Dimboola provided to Frecker after he was charged with the assault on O'Reilly. "When your sporting club is the heart of the community, then it is our responsibility to be a vehicle for [education on family violence]"

== Clubs ==
Nine clubs – Imperials, Irymple, Merbein, Mildura, Ouyen United, Red Cliffs, Robinvale–Euston, South Mildura and Wentworth – participate in the competition, which includes senior and junior grades of football and netball.

=== Locations ===
Club locations - Mildura	Club locations - Greater Sunraysia

=== Current ===
Club	Colours	Nickname	Home ground	Former League	Est.	Years in SFNL	SFNL Senior Premierships	
Club	Colours	Nickname	Home ground	Former League	Est.	Years in SFNL	Total	Years
Imperials		Imps	Brian Weightman Oval. Mildura, Victoria	MWFA	1921	1945–	20	1949, 1950, 1956, 1957, 1971, 1977, 1986, 1987, 1988, 1990, 1992, 1993, 1994, 1995, 1999, 2004, 2005, 2008, 2013, 2024
Irymple		Swallows	Henshilwood Oval. Irymple, Victoria	MDFL	1894	1945–	10	1954, 1966, 1976, 1978, 2006, 2011, 2017, 2019, 2022, 2023
Merbein		Magpies	Kenny Park. Merbein, Victoria	MDFL	1910	1945–	6	1948, 1962, 1963, 1975, 2002, 2003
Mildura		Redlegs, Demons	Brian Weightman Oval. Mildura, Victoria	MDFL	1888	1945–	10	1946, 1951, 1952, 1955, 1958, 1960, 1982, 2007, 2025, 2026
Ouyen United		Kangas	Blackburn Park Ouyen, Victoria and Underbool Recreation Reserve, Underbool, Victoria	–	2015	2016–	2	2016, 2018
Red Cliffs		Diggers, Tigers	Quandong Park, Red Cliffs, Victoria	MDFL	1919	1945–	11	1953, 1959, 1961, 1964, 1980, 1981, 1983, 1985, 2000, 2014, 2015
Robinvale-Euston		Eagles	John James Oval. Robinvale, Victoria	–	2015	2015–	0	–
South Mildura		Bulldogs	Mildura Sporting Precinct. Mildura, Victoria	–	1891	1945–	4	1968, 1969, 1970, 1998
Wentworth District		Roos	George Gordon Oval. Dareton, New South Wales	–	1956	1957–	6	1973, 1984, 1996, 2001, 2009, 2012

=== Former clubs ===
Club	Colours	Nickname	Home ground	Former League	Est.	Years in SFNL	SFNL Senior Premierships		Fate
Club	Colours	Nickname	Home ground	Former League	Est.	Years in SFNL	Total	Years	Fate
Cardross		Lions	Cardross Recreation Reserve, Cardross	–	1935	1948–1961	0	–	Moved to Millewa FL in 1962
Carwarp			Carwarp Recreation Reserve, Carwarp	MDFL		?-1960	0	–	Folded after 1960 season
Coomealla		All Blacks	George Gordon Oval, Dareton	WIFA	1924	1946-1956	0	–	Merged with Curlwaa-Wentworth to form Wentworth District after 1956 season. Re-formed in Millewa FL in 1981
Curlwaa			Curlwaa Oval, Curlwaa	MDFL		1946-1948	0	–	Merged with Wentworth to form Curlwaa-Wentworth after 1948 season
Curlwaa-Wentworth			McLeod Oval, Wentworth	–	1949	1949-1956	0	–	Merged with Coomealla to form Wentworth District after 1956 season.
Nichols Point			Nichols Point Recreation Reserve, Nichols Point	–	1948	1948-?	0	–	Unsure of exact years of participation.
Ouyen		Demons	Blackburn Park, Ouyen	MFL	1937	1979–1982	0	–	Moved to Northern Mallee FL in 1983
RAAF		Blues	No. 1 Oval, Mildura	MFL	1944	1945	1	1945	Folded after 1945 season
Robinvale	(1958-?)(?-2014)	Eagles	John James Oval, Robinvale	MFL	1927	1958–2014	9	1965, 1967, 1972, 1974, 1979, 1989, 1991, 1997, 2010	Merged with Euston to form Robinvale-Euston in 2015
South Merbein		Swans	Kenny Park, Merbein	MDFL	1919	1945–1951	0	–	Disbanded after 1952 season. Re-formed in Millewa FL in 1960.
University			No. 1 Oval, Mildura	–	1940s	1947–1949	1	1947	Folded after 1949 season
Wentworth			McLeod Oval, Wentworth	MDFL	1889	1946-1948	0	–	Merged with Curlwaa to form Curlwaa-Wentworth after 1948 season

== Senior Football Premierships ==
Sunraysia FNL
Senior Football

- 1945 RAAF
- 1946 Mildura
- 1947 University
- 1948 Merbein
- 1949 Imperials
- 1950 Imperials
- 1951 Mildura
- 1952 Mildura
- 1953 Red Cliffs
- 1954 Irymple
- 1955 Mildura
- 1956 Imperials
- 1957 Imperials
- 1958 Mildura
- 1959 Red Cliffs
- 1960 Mildura
- 1961 Red Cliffs
- 1962 Merbein
- 1963 Merbein
- 1964 Red Cliffs
- 1965 Robinvale
- 1966 Irymple
- 1967 Robinvale
- 1968 South Mildura
- 1969 South Mildura
- 1970 South Mildura
- 1971 Imperials
- 1972 Robinvale
- 1973 Wentworth District
- 1974 Robinvale
- 1975 Merbein
- 1976 Irymple
- 1977 Imperials
- 1978 Irymple
- 1979 Robinvale
- 1980 Red Cliffs
- 1981 Red Cliffs
- 1982 Mildura
- 1983 Red Cliffs
- 1984 Wentworth District
- 1985 Red Cliffs
- 1986 Imperials
- 1987 Imperials
- 1988 Imperials
- 1989 Robinvale
- 1990 Imperials
- 1991 Robinvale
- 1992 Imperials
- 1993 Imperials
- 1994 Imperials
- 1995 Imperials
- 1996 Wentworth District
- 1997 Robinvale
- 1998 South Mildura
- 1999 Imperials
- 2000 Red Cliffs
- 2001 Wentworth District
- 2002 Merbein
- 2003 Merbein
- 2004 Imperials
- 2005 Imperials
- 2006 Irymple
- 2007 Mildura
- 2008 Imperials
- 2009 Wentworth District
- 2010 Robinvale
- 2011 Irymple
- 2012 Wentworth District
- 2013 Imperials
- 2014 Red Cliffs
- 2015 Red Cliffs
- 2016 Ouyen United
- 2017 Irymple
- 2018 Ouyen United
- 2019 Irymple
- 2020 In recess > COVID-19
- 2021 (No finals series > COVID-19)
- 2022 Irymple
- 2023 Irymple
- 2024 Imperials
- 2025 Mildura
- 2026 Mildura

Reserves Football

- 2009 - 2019: SFNL Gameday site unavailable
- 2020 In recess > COVID-19
- 2021 No finals series > COVID-19
- 2022 Irymple
- 2023 Merbein
- 2024 Irymple
- 2025 South Mildura
- 2026 Irymple

Thirds Football

- 2009 - 2019: SFNL Gameday site unavailable
- 2020 In recess > COVID-19
- 2021 No finals series > COVID-19
- 2022 Irymple
- 2023 Irymple
- 2024 Irymple
- 2025 Mildura
- 2026 Irymple

Mildura Football League

- 1904 - Fire Brigade: 3.6 d Irymple: 0.3
- 1905 - 1st: Irymple 2nd: Mildura
- 1906 - 1st: Irymple 2nd: Fire Brigade
- 1907 - 1st: Irymple 2nd: Mildura
- 1908 - 1st: Mildura 2nd: Mildura Rovers
- 1909 - 1st: Mildura Rovers 2nd: Irymple
- 1910 - Mildura Rovers: 6.12 d Mildura 3.3
- 1911 - 1st: Mildura Rovers 2nd: Mildura
- 1912 - Irymple: 4.7 d Mildura Rovers: 0.7
- 1913 - 1st: Irymple 2nd: Merbein
- 1914 - Mildura Rovers: 6.10 d Merbein: 2.7
- 1915 - 1st: Irymple declared premiers
- 1916-18: In recess > WW1
- 1919 - West Mildura: 3.7 d Irymple:2.6
- 1920 - Irymple: 6.7 d East Mildura: 4.4
- 1921 - Mildura: 8.8 d Merbein: 4.3
- 1922 - Mildura: 8.12 d Red Cliffs: 3.7
- 1923 - Merbein: 8.8 d Red Cliffs: 6.9
- 1924 - Mildura: 4.4 d Merbein: 2.8
- 1925 - Mildura: 6.8 d Sth Merbein: 4.17
- 1926 - Merbein: 9.10 d Sth Merbein: 6.10
- 1927 - South Merbein: 11.12 d Merbein: 7.9
- 1928 - South Merbein: 11.11 d Merbein: 6.12
- 1929 - South Merbein: 9.15 d Merebin: 5.12
- 1930 - Merbein: 11.6 d Sth Merbein: 6.10
- 1931 - South Merbein: 14.15 d Curlwaa 13.13
- 1932 - Merbein: 11.10 d Sth Merbein: 5.11
- 1933 - South Merbein: 11.12 d Mildura: 7.12
- 1934 - Red Cliffs: 19.16 d Sth Merbein: 15.17
- 1935 - South Merbein: 11.17 d Red Cliffs: 11.8
- 1936 - Imperials: 11.11 d Sth Merbein: 9.16
- 1937 - Merbein: 20.7 d Imperials: 10.11
- 1938 - Merbein: 19.15 d Workers: 11.10
- 1939 - Workers: 12.8 d Red Cliffs: 8.4
- 1940 - Red Cliffs 6.6 d Imperials: 3.11
- 1941-43: In recess > WW2
- 1944 - Merbein: 6.12 d RAAF: 5.13

Mildura Football Association

- 1891 - 1st: Mildura 2nd: North Mildura
- 1892 - South Mildura
- 1893 - South Mildura
- 1894 - 1st: North Mildura 2nd: South Mildura
- 1895 - North Mildura
- 1896 - No official competition
- 1897 - 1st: North Mildura
- 1898 - South Mildura
- 1899 - 1st: South Mildura
- 1900 - 1903: In recess > Second Boer War

Mildura Wednesday Football Association - 1921 to 1929

- 1921 - Fitzroys: 5.6 d Imperials: 1.7
- 1922 - Fitzroys: 5.6 d Imperials: 2.5
- 1923 - Imperials: 3.13 d Fitzroys: 3.6
- 1924 - ?
- 1925 - Mildura Rovers: 9.16 d Imperials: 6.12
- 1926 - Red Cliffs: 10.13 d Imperials: 10.10
- 1927 - Merbein: 10.14 d Red Cliffs: 5.11
- 1928 - ?
- 1929 - Ramblers d Mildura Rovers
- 1930-32: No Wednesday competition

Mildura Wednesday Football League - 1933 to 1934

- 1933 - Mildura Rowers: 4.12 d Red Cliffs: 3.13
- 1934 - Red Cliffs: 6.6 d Mildura Rowers: 4.7
- 1935 - MWFL disbands

== Grand Finals ==
=== Senior Football ===
Mildura Football Association: SENIORS
Year	Premiers	Score	Runners up	Score	Best on Ground	Coach	Comments
1891	1st: Mildura		2nd: North Mildura				
1892	South Mildura		2nd: North Mildura				
1893	South Mildura		2nd: North Mildura				
1894	1st: North Mildura		2nd: South Mildura				
1895	North Mildura						
1896	MFA in recess						MFA in recess
1897	1st: North Mildura						
1898	South Mildura						
1899	1st: South Mildura						
1900-03							In recess>Second Boer War
Mildura Football League
1904	Fire Brigade	3.6 - 24	Irymple	0.4 - 4			
1905	1st: Irymple		2nd: Mildura				
1906	1st: Irymple		2nd: Fire Brigade				
1907	1st: Irymple		2nd: Mildura				
1908	1st: Mildura		2nd: Mildura Rovers				
1909	1st: Mildura Rovers		2nd: Irymple			H Greenwood	
1910	Mildura Rovers	6.12 - 48	Mildura	3.3 - 21		H Greenwood	
1911	1st: Mildura Rovers		2nd: Mildura				
1912	Irymple	4.7 - 31	Mildura Rovers	0.7 - 7		Ernie Shaw	Mildura Recreation Oval
1913	1st: Irymple		2nd: Merbein				
1914	Mildura Rovers	6.10 - 46	Merbein	2.7 - 21		H Greenwood	
1915	1st: Irymple	declared	Premiers			A V Lyon	Shortened season>WW1
1916-18							In recess > WW1
1919	West Mildura	3.7 - 25	Irymple	2.6 - 24		Lyon	
1920	Irymple	6.7 - 43	East Mildura	4.4 - 28		Perc Tickell	
1921	Mildura	8.8 - 56	Merbein	4.3 - 27			
1922	Mildura	8.12 - 60	Red Cliffs	3.7 - 25		C K McKenzie	
1923	Meberin	8.8 - 56	Red Cliffs	6.9 - 45		W Freeman	
1924	Mildura	4.4 - 28	Merbein	2.8 - 20			
1925	Mildura	6.8 - 44	South Merbein	4.17 - 41			Merbein
1926	Merbein	9.10 - 64	South Merbein	6.10 - 46		J Giles	£172
1927	South Merbein	11.12 - 78	Merbein	7.9 - 51			
1928	South Merbein	11.11 - 76	Merbein	6.12 - 48		J Giles	
1929	South Merbein	9.15 - 69	Merbein	5.12 - 42		J Giles	Mildura Recreation Oval. £84
1930	Merbein	11.6 - 72	South Merbein	6.10 - 46			
1931	South Merbein	14.15 - 99	Curlwaa	13.13 - 91			Mildura Recreation Oval
1932	Merbein	11.10 - 76	South Merbein	5.11 - 41		A Tyrers	Mildura Recreation Oval. £80
1933	South Merbein	11.12 - 78	Mildura	7.12 - 54			Mildura Recreation Oval
1934	Red Cliffs	19.16 - 130	South Merbein	15.17 - 107			£121
1935	South Merbein	11.17 - 83	Red Cliffs	11.8 - 74			
1936	Imperials	11.11 - 77	South Merbein	9.16 - 70			
1937	Merbein	20.7 - 127	Imperials	10.11 - 71			
1938	Merbein	19.15 - 129	Workers	11.10 - 76			
1939	Workers	12.8 - 80	Red Cliffs	8.4 - 52			
1940	Red Cliffs	6.6 - 42	Imperials	3.11 - 29			
1941-43							In recess > WW2
1944	Merbein	6.12 - 48	RAAF	5.13 - 43			
Sunraysia Football League
1945	RAAF	22.14 - 146	Mildura	16.15 - 111	Harper	Wally Roach	Mildura Recreation Oval. £310
1946	Mildura	15.10 - 100	Merbein	5.15 - 45		Laurie Leask	Milawa Recreation Oval
1947	University	10.14 - 74	Irymple	6.8 - 44		Ralph Shalless	Mildura Recreation Oval
1948	Merbein	9.9 - 63	Irymple	6.8 - 44	B Hogan (M) &	Jack Doherty	Mildura Recreation Oval
					B Lancaster (I)		
1949	Imperials	16.12 - 108	Red Cliffs	8.12 - 60	Billy O'Donnell (I)	Neil Hogan	No. 1 Oval
1950	Imperials	11.10 - 76	Red Cliffs	11.8 - 74	Brian Weightman (I) &	Jack Doherty	No.1 Oval. £573
					G Benton (I)		
1951	Mildura	15.11 - 101	Red Cliffs	4.7 - 31	Vic Radford (M)	Les Griggs	Mildura Recreation Oval. £608
1952	Mildura	13.10 - 88	Irymple	10.12 - 72	Peter Smith (M)	Les Griggs	No.1 Oval £712
1953	Red Cliffs	12.8 - 80	Mildura	9.7 - 61	Frank Zoch (RC)	Ron Savage	No.1 Oval
1954	Irymple	9.12 - 84	Mildura	9.8 - 62	Lindsay Turnbull (I)	John Sexton	No.1 Oval
1955	Mildura	12.15 - 87	Red Cliffs	8.4 - 52	Graeme Bell (RC)	Les Griggs	No.1 Oval. £794
1956	Imperials	16.13 - 109	Irymple	11.9 - 75	John Waldron (I)	John Waldron	
1957	Imperials	13.15 - 93	Mildura	5.5 - 35		John Waldron	
1958	Mildura	11.14 - 80	Merbein	9.9 - 63		John Stockton	
1959	Red Cliffs	8.14 - 62	Mildura	6.5 - 41		Frank Slater	
1960	Mildura	16.14 - 100	Merbein	7.9 - 51		Roy Burr	
1961	Red Cliffs	7.6 - 48	Merbein	6.9 - 45			
1962	Merbein	6.15 - 51	Imperials	5.5 - 35			
1963	Merbein	9.10 - 64	Imperials	8.10 - 58			
1964	Red Cliffs	9.11 - 65	Imperials	7.14 - 56			
1965	Robinvale	10.13 - 73	Red Cliffs	9.10 - 64			
1966	Irymple	11.8 - 74	Robinvale	6.18 - 54			
1967	Robinvale	11.22 - 88	Irymple	10.12 - 72			
1968	South Mildura	16.10 - 106	Irymple	7.10 - 52			
1969	South Mildura	12.12 - 84	Merbein	5.6 - 36			
1970	South Mildura	10.14 - 74	Robinvale	9.12 - 66			
1971	Imperials	10.17 - 77	Mildura	7.12 - 54			
1972	Robinvale	11.16 - 82	Wentworth	9.10 - 64			
1973	Wentworth	11.12 - 78	Irymple	10.11 - 71			
1974	Robinvale	13.7 - 85	Wentworth	10.14 - 74			
1975	Merbein	13.11 - 89	Irymple	8.11 - 59			
1976	Irymple	14.12 - 96	Imperials	7.4 - 46			
1977	Imperials	15.12 - 102	Robinvale	11.11 - 77			
1978	Irymple	8.16 - 64	South Mildura	5.9 - 39			
1979	Robinvale	12.8 - 80	Imperials	10.15 - 75			
1980	Red Cliffs	23.23 - 161	Mildura	8.11 - 59			
1981	Red Cliffs	13.19 - 97	Mildura	12.8 - 80			
1982	Mildura	16.10 - 106	Red Cliffs	15.15 - 105			
1983	Red Cliffs	24.20 - 164	South Mildura	12.14 - 86			
1984	Wentworth	17.13 - 115	Mildura	12.9 - 81			
1985	Red Cliffs	24.12 - 156	Mildura	12.13 - 85			
1986	Imperials	15.14 - 104	Red Cliffs	12.8 - 80			
1987	Imperials	20.20 - 140	Red Cliffs	10.10 - 70			
1988	Imperials	14.12 - 96	Red Cliffs	11.11 - 77			
1989	Robinvale	10.9 - 69	Imperials	8.14 - 62			
1990	Imperials	15.14 - 104	Red Cliffs	13.9 - 87			
1991	Robinvale	17.15 - 117	Red Cliffs	14.13 - 97			
1992	Imperials	13.10 - 88	Red Cliffs	11.15 - 81			
1993	Imperials	11.16-82 18.15-123	Mildura	11.16-82 9.18-72			
1994	Imperials	16.20 - 116	South Mildura	10.8 - 68			
1995	Imperials	20.14 - 134	South Mildura	12.7 - 79			
1996	Wentworth	11.15 - 81	Imperials	10.17 - 77			
1997	Robinvale	26.11 - 167	Wentworth	18.3 - 111			
1998	South Mildura	15.12 - 102	Imperials	6.18 - 54			
1999	Imperials	16.7 - 103	Robinvale	15.11 - 101			
2000	Red Cliffs	12.16 - 88	Wentworth	9.5 - 59			
2001	Wentworth	18.10 - 118	Robinvale	15.11 - 101			
2002	Merbein	11.19 - 85	Wentworth	11.15 - 81			
2003	Merbein	15.16 - 106	Imperials	11.10 - 76			
2004	Imperials	17.17 - 119	Red Cliffs	11.11 - 77			
2005	Imperials	10.12 - 72	Irymple	10.11 - 71			
2006	Irymple	21.12 - 138	Robinvale	12.5 - 77			
2007	Mildura	19.5 - 119	Imperials	16.11 - 107			
2008	Imperials	19.16 - 130	Robinvale	6.9 - 45			
2009	Wentworth	24.19 - 163	Robinvale	10.10 - 70			
2010	Robinvale	21.12 - 138	Irymple	11.10 - 76			
2011	Irymple	13.10 - 88	Robinvale	12.9 - 81			
2012	Wentworth	14.7 - 91	Irymple	11.18 - 84			
2013	Imperials	12.8 - 80	Irymple	6.10 - 46			
2014	Red Cliffs	15.20 - 110	Imperials	14.6 - 90			
2015	Red Cliffs	15.9 - 99	Imperials	14.7 - 91			
2016	Ouyen United	16.10 - 106	Mildura	11.11 - 77			
2017	Irymple	9.15 - 69	Ouyen United	9.8 - 62		Will Callow &	
						Todd George	
2018	Ouyen United	10.11 - 71	Irymple	10.6 - 66		Andy Jardine	
2019	Irymple	9.12 - 66	Imperials	8.11 - 59		Will Callow &	
						Todd George	
2020	SFNL in recess						COVID-19
2021	Shortened season		No finals series				COVID-19
2022	Irymple	10.5 - 65	Wentworth	8.11 - 59		Tom Brownbridge &	Mildura Sporting Precinct
						Dan Coghlan	
2023	Irymple	8.14 - 62	Robinvale Euston	4.9 - 33		Dan Coghlan &	Mildura Sporting Precinct
						Thomas Brownidge	
2024	Imperials	6.11 - 47	Wentworth	6.8 - 44		Brad Vallance	Mildura Sporting Precinct
2025	Mildura	12.8 (80)	Irymple	10.8 (68)	Jono Lee (Mildura)	Mark Alvey & Sam Kerridge	Mildura Sporting Precinct
2026	Mildura	15.7 - 97	Red Cliff	6.13 - 49	Luke Reynolds (M) &	Mark Alvey & Sam Kerridge	Mildura Sporting Precinct
					Elijah Brown (M)		
Year	Premiers	Score	Runner Up	Score	Best on Ground	Coach	Venue/Comments

=== Reserves Football ===
In 1928, the Mildura Junior Football League was formed, which was a "Reserves" football competition, set up for boys too old for the Under 18 competition. In 1945, the initial seconds 18 football competition was known as the "Reserves", then between 1946 and 1954, it was referred to as the "Junior" competition, even though adults were playing in this competition. Then from 1955 onwards the Sunraysia Daily referred to it as the "Seconds" competition.

Sunraysia Football League: RESERVES
Year	Premiers	Score	Runners up	Score	Best on Ground	Coach	Venue / Comments
Mildura Junior Football League (Reserves)
1928	South Merbein	7.7 - 49	Merbein	5.13 - 43			Mildura Recreation Reserve
1929	Wentworth	5.11- 41	South Merbein	4.9 - 33			Mildura Recreation Reserve
1930	Curlwaa	9.6 - 60	Mildura	7.8 - 50		Claude Hatch	At South Merbein
1931	Imperials	6.12 - 48	Merbein	2.8 - 20		A E Francis	At Merbein
1932	Imperials	16.10 - 106	Coomealla	3.10 - 28		A E Francis	At Merbein
1933	Red Cliffs	12.22 - 94	Carwarp	4.6 - 30			Mildura Oval
1934	Red Cliffs	9.19 - 73	Curlwaa	6.7 - 43	Cumper	Smith	Mildura Recreation Oval
1935	Commealla	defeated	Curlwaa				
1936	Imperials	11.12 - 78	Irymple	9.11 - 65		F Gott	Mildura Recreation Reserve
1937	Coomealla	13.12 - 90	Red Cliffs	9.19 - 73			
1938	Wentworth	11.20 - 86	Coomealla	4.6 - 30			Kenny Memorial Park, Merbein
1939	Wentworth	12.15 - 87	Irymple	8.14 - 62		Merv Wescombe	Mildura Oval
1940-45							In recess > WW2
Sunraysia Football League
1945	RAAF	7.15 - 57	Mildura	2.5 - 17			"Reserves"
1946	Curlwaa	11.8 - 74	Merbein	5.8 - 38			"Juniors"
1947	Merbein	9.8 - 62	Red Cliffs	8.9 - 57			"Juniors" At Recreation Reserve
1948	Coomealla	12.11 - 83	Merbein	8.4 - 52	E Payne (C)		"Juniors" At Wentworth. Undefeated Premiers
1949	A: Curlwaa	defeated	Nichols Point			Ron Pike	"Juniors"At Merbein.
1949	B: Irymple	7.13 - 55	Mildura	3.11 - 29			"Juniors"
1950	A: Curlwaa Wentworth	14.16 - 100	Nichol's Point	6.9 - 45			"Juniors" Undefeated Premiers
1950	B: Mildura South	11.14 - 80	Cardross	5.6 - 36			"Juniors"
1951	A: Red Cliffs	16.14 - 110	Curlwaa Wentworth	10.11 - 71			At No. 1 Oval
1951	B: Cardross	defeated	Mildura				"Juniors" At Red Cliffs
1952	A: Red Cliffs	8.3 - 51	Curlwaa Wentworth	6.15 - 51			"Juniors" Drawn Grand Final. At No.1 Oval.
1952	A: Red Cliffs	10.10 - 70	Curlwaa Wentworth	5.7 - 37			"Juniors" Grand Final Replay
1952	B: Irymple	10.17 - 77	Mildura South	6.7 - 43			"Juniors"
1953	A: Curlwaa Wentworth	16.12 - 108	Coomealla	13.20 - 98			"Juniors"
1953	B: Imperials	9.18 - 72	Irymple	6.6 - 42			"Juniors" At No.3 Oval
1954	A: Curlwaa Wentworth	13.11 - 89	Coomealla	7.13 - 55			"Juniors" At Merbein
1954	B: Carwarp	7.17 - 59	South Mildura	5.9 - 39			"Juniors" At Red Cliffs
1955	A: Coolmealla	8.15 - 63	Carwarp	7.19 - 61			"Seconds" At Merbein
1955	B: South Mildura	15.16 - 106	Nichol's Point	3.5 - 23			"Seconds" At Irymple. 1st Grand Final
1955	B: Imperials	9.11 - 65	Nichol's Point	4.6 - 30			"Seconds" at Irymple. 2nd Grand Final
1956	A: Red Cliffs	12.22 - 94	Mildura	3.6 - 24			"Seconds" At Merbein
1956	B: Irymple	v	Nichol's Point				"Seconds" At No.3 Oval
1957	Red Cliffs	4.14 - 38	Carwarp	4.9 - 33			
1958	Mildura	6.11 - 47	Red Cliffs	7.3 - 45			
1959							
1960	Red Cliffs	4.3 - 27	South Mildura	1.7 - 13			
1961							
1962	Merbein	18.14 - 122	Robinvale	8.8 - 56			
1963	Red Cliffs	11.13 - 79	Merbein	6.7 - 43			
1964							
1965	Imperials	7.7 - 49	Red Cliffs	6.4 - 40			
1966							
1967	Irymple	7.12 - 54	Robinvale	8.4 - 52			
1968							
1969	Red Cliffs	3.5 - 23	Robinvale	2.7 - 19			
1970	?						
1971	Wentworth	12.10 - 82	Imperials	8.9 - 57			
1972	Robinvale	11.13 - 79	Wentworth	4.3 - 27			
1973	Imperials	13.11 - 89	Robinvale	6.6 - 42			
1974	Imperials	8.7 - 55	Red Cliffs	6.15 - 51			
1975	Robinvale	9.5 - 59	South Mildura	7.6 - 48			
1976	Imperials	5.8 - 38	Mildura	5.4 - 34			
1977	Mildura	9.12 - 66	Imperials	7.5 - 47			
1978	Irymple	6.6 - 42	Red Cliffs	1.5 - 11			
1979	Mildura	9.9 - 63	Robinvale	6.6 - 42			
1980	Wenthworth	18.18 - 126	Mildura	9.12 - 66			
1981	Robinvale	17.15 - 117	Red Cliffs	10.11 - 71			
1982	Mildura	20.14 - 134	Robinvale	10.15 - 75			
1983	Robinvale	21.15 - 141	Mildura	15.17 - 107			
1984	Irymple	22.6 - 138	South Mildura	9.8 - 62			
1985	Imperials	19.12 - 126	Red Cliffs	14.11 - 95			
1986	Red Cliffs	10.12 - 72	Imperials	4.11 - 35			
1987	Imperials	11.17 - 83	South Mildura	4.7 - 35			
1988	Mildura	22.15 - 147	Imperials	10.9 - 69			
1989	Mildura	14.15 - 99	Red Cliffs	9.6 - 60			
1990	Mildura	16.8 - 104	Imperials	13.6 - 84			
2020							In recess > COVID-19
2021							No finals > COVID-19
2022	Irymple	8.11 - 59	Imperials	5.5 - 35			Mildura Sports Precinct
2023	Merbein	13.9 - 87	Irymple	5.2 - 32			Mildura Sports Precinct
2024	Irymple	8.5 - 53	Robinvale Euston	5.9 - 39			Mildura Sports Precinct
2025							

=== Thirds Football ===
- Juniors: (1917 to 1925)
- Under 18's: (1926 to 1940)
- Under 18's: (1946 to 2025)

Sunraysia Football League: Under 18's
Year	Age	Premiers	Score	Runners up	Score	Best on Ground	Coach	Venue/Comments
Mildura Junior Football Association
1917	Juniors	Merbein	3.5 - 23	Irymple	3.3 - 21			
1920	Juniors	Merbein	8.8 - 56	Curlwaa	5.10 - 40			Merbein Rec Reserve
1921	Juniors							
1922	Juniors	Red Cliffs	defeated	Carwarp				
1923	Juniors	Red Cliffs	6.9 - 45	Carwarp	1.5 - 11			
1924	Juniors	Mildura	5.8 - 56	Carwarp	5.10 - 40			Red Cliffs Rec Reserve
1925	Juniors	Ramblers						
Mildura Football League: Under 18 Competition
1926	U/18	Merbein Wanderers	9.11 - 65	Irymple	4.1 - 25			
1927	U/18	Merebin Wanderers	7.6 - 48	Irymple	4.2 - 26			Undefeated Premiers
1928	U/18	Red Cliffs	5.8 - 38	Mildura Rovers	5.5 - 35			At Irymple
1929	U/18	Mildura Rovers	6.8 - 44	Red Cliffs	4.6 - 30			At Mildura Recreation Reserve
1930	U/18	Mildura Rovers	11.12 - 78	Red Cliffs	8.7 - 55			At Irymple
1931	U/18	Mildura Rovers	10.3 - 63	Merbein Wanderers	6.15 - 51			Kenny Memorial Park, Merbein
1932	U/18	Merbein Wanderers	5.11 - 41	Mildura Rovers	5.6 - 36			At No.3 Oval, Mildura
1933	U/18	Mildura Rovers	7.5 - 47	Merbein Wanderers	4.5 - 29			At South Merbein
1934	U/18	Red Cliffs	15.8 - 98	Merbein	8.2 - 50			No.3 Oval, Mildura
1935	U/18	Merbein Wanderers	defeated	Mildura Rovers				No.3 Oval, Mildura
1936	U/18	Mildura Rovers	6.10 - 46	Merbein Wanderers	3.5 - 23			At South Merbein
1937	U/18	Merbein Wanderers	11.19 - 85	Mildura Rovers	2.5 - 17			Lock Oval, Mildura
1938	U/18	Irymple	V's	Red Cliffs				No.3 Oval, Mildura. Result not published?
1939	U/18	Merbein Wanderers	11.9 - 75	Iryymple	6.9 - 45			No.3 Oval, Mildura
1940	U/18	Mildura Rovers	15.11 - 101	Irymple	3.10 - 28			No.1 Oval, Mildura
1941-45								In recess > WW2
Sunraysia Football League: Under 18's
1946	U/18	Red Cliffs	9.16 - 70	Mildura High School	6.19 - 55			At Mildura High School
1947	U/18	Merbein	9.7 - 61	Red Cliffs	5.10 - 40			Mildura High School
1948	U/18	Merbein	11.4 - 70	Mildura Community Centre	6.5 - 35			
1949	U/18	Red Cliffs	8.12 - 60	Merbein	7.7 - 49			At Mildura High School
1950	U/18	Rovers	10.9 - 69	Mildura CC	6.8 - 44			
1951	U/18	Rovers	5.8 - 38	Mildura CC	4.9 - 33	C Nicolaou		
1952	U/18	Red Cliffs	7.11 - 53	Rovers	5.1 - 31			At Merbein
1953	U/18	Mildura CC	3.10 - 28	Merbein	4.4 - 28			Drawn Grand Final At Red Cliffs
	U/18	Merbein	6.10 - 46	Mildura CC	4.4 - 28			Grand Final Replay At No.1 Oval
1954	U/18	Mildura CC	V's	Red Cliffs				
1955	U/18	Red Cliffs	3.11 - 29	Mildura	3.3 - 21			At Red Cliffs
1956	U/18	Irymple	8.7 - 55	Merbein	5.5 - 35			At Mildura Recreation Oval
1957	U/18	Red Cliffs						
1958								
1959	Thirds	Red Cliffs	2.13 - 25	Imperials	2.2 - 14			
1960								
1965	Thirds	Irymple	7.9 - 51	Red Cliffs	7.7 - 49			
1970		?						
1971		?						
1972		?						
1973	Thirds	Red Cliffs	12.3 - 75	Mildura	9.9 - 72			
1974	U/18	Imperials	16.15 - 111	Merbein	6.3 - 39			
1975	Thirds	Imperials	5.9 - 39	Mildura	2.5 - 17			
1976	U/17	Imperials	8.5 - 53	Mildura	4.4 - 28			
1977	U/17	Mildura	12.5 - 77	Imperials	4.12 - 36			
1978	U/17	Red Cliffs	7.7 - 49	Imperials	6.12 - 48			
1979	U/17	Mildura	11.9 - 75	Imperials	6.8 - 44			
1980	U/17	Imperials	14.15 - 99	Robinvale	9.11 - 65			
1981	U/17	Imperials	12.9 - 81	Robinvale	10.7 - 67			
1982	U/17	Imperials	17.13 - 115	Mildura	8.2 - 50			
1983	U/17	Imperials	17.18 - 120	Mildura	11.5 - 71			
1984	U/17	Robinvale	13.4 - 82	Imperials	4.8 - 32			
1985	U/17	Mildura	8.9 - 57	Red Cliffs	6.8 - 44			
1986	U/17	Imperials	7.4 - 46	Mildura	6.6 - 42			
1987	U/17	Mildura	9.15 - 69	Imperials	6.8 - 44			
1988	U/17	Mildura	12.6 - 78	Red Cliffs	8.2 - 50			
1989	U/17	Mildura	10.11 - 71	Red Cliffs	10.3 - 63			
1990	U/17	Imperials	9.9 - 63	Red Cliffs	5.6 - 36			
1991	U/17	Mildura		Red Cliffs			R Jackson & C Van Wyk	No.1 Oval, Mildura
1992	U/17	Mildura		Red Cliffs		Bruce Clark (M)	M Pullen	No.1 Oval, Mildura
2020								In recess > COVID-19
2021								No finals > COVID-19
2022	U/18	Irymple	10.8 - 68	Mildura	3.6 - 24			Mildura Sports Precinct
2023	U/18	Irymple	12.7 - 79	Robinvale	10.3 - 63			Mildura Sports Precinct
2024	U/18	Irymple	9.11 - 65	Mildura	6.10 - 46			Mildura Sports Precinct
2025								

=== Under 16's ===
- U/16's: 1946 - 1956
- U/15's: From ?
- U/15.5: 2004 - 2006
- U/16's: 2007 - 2025

Sunraysia Junior Football League: U/16's
Year	Premiers	Score	Runners up	Score	Best on Ground	Coach	Venue/Comments
1946	Mildura Community Centre No.1	v	Red Cliffs Community Centre				At Lock Oval
1947	Mildura High School	8.8 - 56	Mildura CC	8.8 - 56			Drawn Grand Final
	Mildura CC	3.8 - 26	Mildura HS	1.6 - 12	Weightman		Grand Final Replay
1948	Mildura HS	defeated	Irymple				
1949	Mildura HS	8.6 - 56	Red Cliffs	2.5 - 11			Mildura High School
1950	Merbein	4.7 - 31	Mildura HS	3.11 - 29			
1951	Irymple	10.9 - 69	Merbein	2.9 - 27	L Photopolous (I)		
1952	Mildura CC	2.9 - 21	Red Cliffs	3.2 - 20	J Weaver (RC)		At No.1 Oval
1953	Red Cliffs	7.11 - 53	Merbein	4.5 - 29			At No.3 Oval
1954	Irymple	9.6 - 60	Merbein	2.7- 21			At Red Cliffs
1955	Merbein	9.11 - 65	Irymple	6.8 - 44	Hassa Mann (M)		At No.3 Oval
1956	Merbein	defeated	Red Cliffs		Hassa Mann (M)		
1957							
1958							
1959							
1960							
1961							
1962							
1963							
1964							
1965	Robinvale	4.6 - 30	Imperials	3.10 - 28			"Fourths"
1966							
1967							
1968	Red Cliffs						
1969							
1970							
1971							
1972							
1973	Imperials	11.12 - 78	South Mildura	3.7 - 25			Fourths
1974	Merbein	10.6 - 66	Imperials	5.8 - 38			Fourths
1975	Coomealla		Red Cliffs				
1976	Red Cliffs	16.14 - 110	Mildura	4.2 - 26			U/15's
1977	Mildura	8.6 - 54	Mildura HS	3.4 - 22			U/15's
1978	Imperials	14.13 - 97	Red Cliffs	3.3 - 21			U/15's
1979	Mildura HS		Coomealla				
1980	Coomealla	11.2 - 68	Merbein	7.8 - 50			U/15's
1981	Red Cliffs		Imperials				
1982	Mildura HS	11.15 - 81	Imperials	5.4 - 34	C McGown (MHS)		U/15's
1983	Red Cliffs	7.8 - 50	Merbein	5.4 - 34		M Harris	U/15's
1984	Imperials	8.7 - 55	Mildura HS	6.1 - 37			U/15's
1985	Mildura	12.12 - 84	Wentworth	8.8 - 56			U/15's
1986	Mildura		Irymple				
1987	Mildura		Imperials				U/15's
1988	Imperials		Mildura				
1989	Red Cliffs	10.13 - 73	Mildura	4.6 - 30			U/15's
1990	Mildura	7.11 - 53	Red Cliffs	4.7 - 31		Peter O'Toole	U/15's
1991	Robinvale	18.8 - 122	Red Cliffs	4.6 - 30	S Bowden (R)		U/15's
1992	Red Cliffs		Robinvale				
1993	Imperials	14.14 - 98	Mildura	2.6 - 18	Blair Patterson (RC) &	S Cuai &	U/15's
					Matthew James (RC)	C Marciano	
1994	South Mildura	14.12 - 96	Red Cliffs	6.6 - 42			U/15's
1995	Imperials	9.9 - 63	South Mildura	6.10 - 46			U/15's
1996	Imperials	15.7 - 97	Irymple	7.3 - 45			U/15's
1997	Imperials	6.6 - 42	Irymple	5.7 - 37			U/15's
1998	South Mildura	9.10 - 64	Mildura	5.5 - 35			U/15's
1999	Imperials	10.11 - 71	Red Cliffs	10.10 - 70	D Blair (RC) &		U/15's
					J Longeri (I)		
2000	Robinvale		Wentworth				
2001	Red Cliffs		Wentworth				
2002	Red Cliffs	10.8 58	South Mildura	9.6 - 60		Henry Henderson	U/15's
2003	Imperials		Red Cliffs				
2004	South Mildura	10.11 - 71	Imperials	8.4 - 52			U/15.5. At Robinvale
2005	South Mildura	10.11 - 71	Imperials	7.9 - 51			U/15.5
2006	Irymple	21.15 - 141	Red Cliffs	5.7 - 37			U/15.5
2007	Irymple	17.8 - 110	Wentworth	6.6 - 42			U/16's
2008	Imperials	5.8 - 38	Irymple	4.14 - 38			
2009	Mildura	9.11 - 65	Imperials	7.2 - 44			Quandong Park
2010	Wentworth	6.15 - 45	Irymple	5.10 - 40			
2011	Div 1: Mildura	14.6 - 90	South Mildura	10.8 - 68			No. 1 Oval
2012	Red Cliffs	11.7 - 73	Mildura	8.9 - 57			John James Oval
2013	Imperials	6.16 - 52	Mildura	5.9 - 39			
2014	Wentworth	9.10 - 64	Irymple	9.5 - 59			
2015	South Mildura	17.12 - 114	Robinvale Euston	3.6 - 24			
2016	Robinvale Euston	14.14 - 98	Irymple	5.3 - 33			No.1 Oval
2017	Imperials	8.4 - 52	Robinvale Euston	7.4 - 46			No.1 Oval
2018	Robinvale Euston	9.8 - 62	Imperials	6.12 - 48			
2019	Irymple	14.5 - 89	Robinvale Euston	11.5 - 71			
2020							In recess > COVID-19
2021							Shortened season > COVID-19
2022	Robinvale Euston	9.4 - 58	Mildura	7.8 - 50			Mildura Sports Precinct
2023	Mildura	7.13 - 55	Irymple	7.2 - 44			Mildura Sports Precinct
2024	Irymple	11.10 - 76	South Mildura	3.2 - 20			Mildura Sports Precinct

=== Under 14's ===
- 1961 - 1973: Under 14?
- 1974 - 2003: Under 13?
- 2005 - 2006: Under 13.5?
- 2007 - 2025: Under 14

Sunraysia Junior Football League: U/14's
Year	Age	Premiers	Score	Runners up	Score	Best on Ground	Coach	Venue/Comments
1961	U/14	Red Cliffs						
1962	U/14							
1965								
1974	U/13	Imperials						
1975	U/13	Imperials						
1976	U/13	Imperials	4.7 - 31	South Mildura	3.9 - 27			
1977	U/13	Red Cliffs	6.3 - 39	Imperials	6.0 - 36			
1978	U/13	Red Cliffs	7.4 - 46	Coomealla	5.3 - 33			
1979	U/13							
1980	U/13	Mildura High School	4.7 - 31	Imperials	3.6 - 24			
1981	U/13							
1982	U/13	Imperials	13.9 - 87	Robinvale	4.1 - 21			
1983	U/13	Imperials	7.8 - 50	Merbein	1.7 - 13			Undefeated Premiers
1984	U/13	Irymple	13.11 - 89	Red Cliffs	7.5 - 47			
1985	U/13	Mildura	14.9 - 93	South Mildura	6.2 - 38			
1986	U/13							
1987	U/13	Red Cliffs	6.8 - 44	Mildura	3.5 - 23			
1988	U/13	Mildura		Imperials			Peter O'Toole	
1989	U/13	Robinvale	7.10 - 52	Mildura	4.7 - 31			
1990	U/13	Robinvale	10.7 - 67	South Mildura	9.6 - 60			
1991	U/13	Red Cliffs	11.16 - 82	Euston	1.7 - 13			
1992	U/13							
1993	U/13	Imperials	5.6 - 36	South Mildura	4.11 - 35	David Clohesy (I) &	Ian Roberts	
						Chris Tarrant (SM)		
1994	U/13	Imperials	9.16 - 70	Euston	5.12 - 42			
1995	U/13	Imperials	10.14 - 74	Wentworth	3.3 - 15	Mark Fitzpatrick (I) &	Andrew Wood	Undefeated Premiers
						Craig Chapple (W)		
1996	U/13	Imperials	15.7 - 97	Wentworth	8.2 - 50		Ken Innes	
1997	U/13.A	Robinvale	8.4 - 52	Imperials	6.6 - 42			
	U/13.B	Mildura	7.12 - 54	Irymple	0.0 - 0			
1998	U/13.A	South Mildura	9.14 - 68	Mildura	4.1 - 25	Tristan Johns (SM) &		
						Cameron Hall (M)		
	U/13.B	Red Cliffs	8.6 - 54	Merbein	7.6 - 48			
1999	U/13.A	Wentworth	8.0 - 48	Red Cliffs	6.9 - 45	Kurt McGlynn (W) &		
						R Wilson (RC)		
	U/13.B	Mildura	4.6 - 30	South Mildura	3.5 - 23			
2000								
2001								
2002	U/13	Imperials	8.4 - 52	South Mildura	2.4 - 16	N Elmit (I) &	Peter Walker	
						T O'Halloran (SM)		
	Colts	South Mildura	11.3 - 69	Irymple	6.8 - 44	D Lloyd (SM) &	Steve Paynting	
						G Hickey (I)		
2003								
2004								
2005	U/13.5	Imperials	6.8 - 44	Wentworth	3.9 - 27			
	Colts	Irymple	7.7 - 49	Mildura	3.11 - 29			
2006	U/13.5	Imperials	12.8 - 80	Irymple	1.3 - 9			
	Colts	Imperials	7.3 - 45	Mildura	5.1 - 31			
2007	U/14	Mildura	15.10 - 100	South Mildura	2.5 - 17	B Christodoulo (M) &	Trevor Rowles	
						J Boehm (M)		
	Colts	Imperials	13.8 - 86	Irymple	7.13 - 55	J Barracks (Imps) &	Jack Kelly	
						B Hodson		
2008	U/14	Imperials	4.7 - 31	Mildura	3.9 - 27			
	Colts	Mildura	8.7 - 55	Red Cliffs	2.2 - 14			
2009	U/14	Irymple	16.24 - 120	Mildura	3.4 - 22			Quandong Park, Red Cliff
2010	U/14	Mildura	8.7 - 55	South Mildura	5.6 - 36			
2011	U/14	Red Cliffs	12.2 - 74	Imperials	2.3 - 15			No. 1 Oval, Mildura
2012	U/14	Irymple	8.2 - 50	Robinvale	5.3 - 33			John James Oval, Robinvale
2013	U/14.5	Wentworth	9.7 - 61	Robinvale	7.4 - 46			
2014	U/14.5	South Mildura	10.7 - 67	Red Cliffs	5.3 - 33			
2015	U/14.5	Robinvale	8.5 - 53	South Mildura	4.8 - 32			
2016	U/14	Imperials	8.9 - 57	Robinvale	6.6 - 42			
2017	U/14	Robinvale	12.11 - 83	Mildura	3.2 - 20			Quandong Park, Red Cliff
2018	U/14							
2019	U/14							
2020	U/14							In recess > COVID-19
2021	U/14							No finals > COVID-19
2022	U/14	Wentworth	10.4 - 64	Irymple	4.7 - 31			Mildura Sports Precinct
2023	U/14	South Mildura	7.6 - 48	Imperials	2.4 - 16			Mildura Sports Precinct
2024	U/14	South Mildura	7.3 - 45	Wentworth	5.7 - 37			Mildura Sports Precinct
2025	U/14	Robinvale Euston	10.6 - 66	Irymple	8.8 - 56	Mildura Sporting Precinct		

== Football Premiership Table ==
Senior Football
Sunraysia FNL – Football Premiership
1892 to 2024

Football Club	Mildura FA: 1891 - 1903	Mildura & DFL: 1904 - 1944	Sunraysia FNL: 1945 - 2024	Total
Fire Brigade FC		1		1
Imperials FC		1	20	21
Irymple FC		7	10	17
Merbein FC		7	6	13
Mildura FC	1	5	9	15
Mildura Rovers FC		4		4
North Mildura FC	3			3
Ouyen United FC			2	2
RAAF FC			1	1
Red Cliffs FC		2	11	13
Robinvale FC			9	9
South Merbein FC		6		6
South Mildura FC	4		4	8
University FC			1	1
Wenthworth & DFC			6	6
West Mildura FC		1		1
Workers FC		1		1
TOTAL	8	35	78	121

== League Best and Fairest ==
=== Senior Football ===
Mildura FL

In 1914, Mr Miller agreed to donate a trophy for the best and fairest player in the Mildura FL, but later on in the year he decided to donate the trophy to the premiership team, Mildura Rovers.

- Pollock Medal. Donated by Mr. J Pollock Junior for only the 1934 Mildura FL season.
  - 1934 - Laurie Leask - Mildura FC. 7 votes
- Snow Trophy. In 1938 the Sunraysia Daily newspaper had a Mildura FL best and fairest award, which was a public poll from a cut out newspaper coupon. The winner was -
  - 1938 - Laurie Leask - Workers FC. 935 votes.

Sunraysia FNL

The very first Sunraysia FL best and fairest award in 1946, was called the Ozone Medal as it was donated by the Ozone Picture Theatre. The first official best and fairest award presented by the Sunraysia Football League in 1947, was known as the Sunraysia Trophy for a number of years.

The Sunraysia Trophy appears to have been renamed the McLeod Memorial Medal in 1955, in honour of former Mildura footballer, Private Gregor "Jigger" Drummond McLeod, who was born on 15 April 1909 and died in 1942 while serving in the 2/21 Australian Infantry Battalion

1960 and 1961 McLeod Trophy winner, Johnny Martin (Wentworth) also won the 1956 VFA - J.J. Liston Trophy.

Multiple Medal Winners

- 4 - Don Favlo: 1995, 2006, 2009, 2013
- 3 - Kevin Coleman: 1973, 1974, 1975
- 2 - Neil "Steelo" Hogan: 1952, 1953
- 2 - Ian Ross: 1955, 1958
- 2 - Bill Lanyon: 1960, 1961
- 2 - John Martin: 1960, 1961
- 2 - Bruce Tschirpig: 1969, 1970
- 2 - Phillip Nash: 1986, 1987
- 2 - Tony Hickey: 1991, 1992
- 2 - Brad Eaton: 2005, 2007

Sunraysia FNL: Best & Fairest Award: McLeod Medal
Year	Best & Fairest	Club	Votes
1945	No award		
The Ozone Medal
1946	Austie F Nunan &	South Mildura	
	Les Penny	Imperials	
The Sunraysia Trophy
1947	Ralph Shalless	University	28
1948	John Poole	University	
1949	Jim Lang	South Merbein	
1950	Don Matheson	Merbein	29
1951	Arthur Fox	Red Cliffs	31
1952	Neil Hogan	South Mildura	26
1953	Neil Hogan	Imperials	23
1954	Frank Doyle &	Merbein	16
	Lindsay Turnbull	Irymple	16
McLeod Memorial Medal
1955	Ian Ross	Red Cliffs	17
1956	Bob Rowse	Merbein	11
1957	Frank Slater	Red Cliffs	22
1958	Ian Ross	Red Cliffs	31
1959	Jack Evans	South Mildura	23
1960	Bill Lanyon &	Mildura	24
	John Martin	Wentworth	24
1961	John Martin &	Irymple	21
	Bill Lanyon †	Mildura	21
1962	John Howden	Irymple	21
1963	Kevin Nihill	Imperials	20
	Kevin Wall †	Wentworth	20
1964	Kevin Stephens	Mildura	
1965	John Croft	Imperials	
1966	Mike Butcher	Mildura	
1967	Ken Mansell	South Mildura	
1968	Ken Snell	Irymple	
1969	Bruce Tschirpig	Wentworth	
1970	Bruce Tschirpig	Wentworth	
1971	Roly Alderton	Imperials	
1972	Gavin Ridley	Robinvale	
1973	Kevin Coleman	Red Cliff	
1974	Kevin Coleman	Red Cliff	25
1975	Kevin Coleman	Irymple	
1976	Roger McGlynn	Wentworth	
1977	Rocky Pollock	Merbein	
1978	Michael Bowden	Red Cliffs	
1979	Geoff Lucas &	Mildura	
	Gary Robinson &	Red Cliffs	
	John White	Ouyen	
1980	Phillip Nash	Imperials	
1981	Terry Fitzgerald	Mildura	
1982	John Cleary	Red Cliffs	
1983	Jamie Siddons &	Robinvale	
	Alan Hassell	Red Cliffs	
1984	Pat Healy	Robinvale	
1985	Peter Johns	South Mildura	
1986	Phillip Nash	Imperials	
1987	Phillip Nash	Imperials	
1988	Brett Pickering	Imperials	
1989	Jeff Scott	Mildura	
1990	Trevor Larkins	Red Cliffs	
1991	Tony Hickey	Imperials	
1992	Tony Hickey	Imperials	
1993	Michael Bilucaglia	South Mildura	
1994	Trevor Larkins	Wentworth	
1995	Don Falvo	Robinvale	
1996	Jason Spivey	Merbein	
1997	Paul Hogarth	Imperials	
1998	Matthew Walder	Merbein	
1999	Jason Spivey	Merbein	
2000	Tim Leng	Mildura	
2001	Craig Deckert	Mildura	
2002	Leigh Riordan	Merbein	
2003	Ryan O'Callaghan	Mildura	
2004	Guy Booker	South Mildura	
	Michael Faulkhead	Red Cliffs	
2005	Brad Eaton	Irymple	
2006	Don Falvo	Robinvale	
2007	Brad Eaton	Irymple	
	Anthony Matthews	Mildura	
2008	Richard Handreck	Robinvale	
2009	Don Falvo	Robinvale	
2010	James Watt	Wentworth	
2011	Mark Alvey	Wentworth	
2012	Donato Deangelis	Irymple	
2013	Don Favlo	Robinvale	
2014	Brodie Hodson	Irymple	
2015	Tim McCauley	South Mildura	
2016	Nathan Hamence &	Irymple	15
	Ash Rowe	Merbein	15
	Derek Smith	Wentworth	15
2017	Josh Martin	Mildura	19
2018	Joshua Gregg	Ouyen United	26
2019	Daniel Coghlan	Irymple	25
2020	SFNL in recess >	COVID-19	
2021	No finals series >	COVID-19	
2022	Kaine Stevens	Ouyen United	22
2023	Benji Neal	Robinvale	24
2024	Bryce Hards	Imperials	28
2025	Baxter Mensch	Robinvale	28
2026	Jaxon Neagle	South Mildura	
2027			
Year	Best & Fairest	Club	Votes

†: denotes the award was won retrospectively.

The Sunraysia Daily - Player of the Year Award

The Sunraysia Daily sports journalist initiated a senior football Player of the Year in 1950, based on the three, two, one voting system.

- 1950 - Don Matheson - Merbein FC: 26 votes
- 1955 - Jack Young - Irymple FC: 16 votes

=== Reserves ===
In 1947, the first Reserves or "Junior" section (as they called it) best and fairest award, the Murray Linton Trophy went to W Rodgers of the Curlwaa FC.

Between 1949 and 1956, the Reserves competition had two divisions, a Junior A section and a Junior B section.

Sunraysia FNL: RESERVES Best & Fairest Award
Year	Best & Fairest	Club	Votes
Murray Linton Trophy
1945	No award?		
1946	No award?		
1947	W Rodgers	Curlwaa	
1948	Andy Webb	Wentworth	
1949	A: Laurie Matulick	Nichol's Point	
1949	B: Max Wallenaffer &	Irymple	
1949	B: Bert Gathercole	Coomealla	
1950	A: W "Bill" Gibbs	Carwarp	26
1950	B: A Cumming &	Mildura South	19
1950	B: Bert Gathercole	Coomealla	19
1951	A: W "Bill" Moody	Carwarp	
1951	B: S "Bill" Hards	Mildura	
1952	A: Ron S Brown	Curlwaa/Wentworth	19
1952	B: Noel Doering	Carwarp	19
1953	A: Laurie Siviour	Curlwaa/Wentworth	
1953	B: Bill "Whizzer" White	South Mildura	24
1954	A: Stan Nokes	Coomealla	14
1954	B: Bill "Whizzer" White	South Mildura	18
1955	A: Geoff Williams	Carwarp	14
1955	B: Don Whitecross	Nichol's Point	20
1956	A: Brian Fahey	Curlwaa/Wentworth	16
1956	B: Ted Atkinson	Nichol's Point	20
1957	Frank Zoch	Carwarp	
1958	Bill O'Loughlin	Carwarp	
1959	Bill O'Loughlin	Carwarp	
1960	Les Airs	South Mildura	
1961	Orm McLeod	Wentworth	
1962	Bob Simpson	Mildura	
1963	Graeme Tatchell	Merbein	
1964	Bill Antonie	Imperials	
1965	Bill Gregory	Mildura	
1966	Colin Cleary	Red Cliffs	
1967	Wally Kebble	South Mildura	
1968	Max Smythe	Robinvale	
1969	Bill Antonie	Imperials	
1970	Geoff Gill	South Mildura	
Tom Holcroft Medal
1971	Keith Chapman	Wentworth	
1972	Peter Wade	Wentworth	
1973	Alan Lambert	Red Cliffs	
1974	Bob Stephens	Red Cliffs	
1975	Barry Fullarton	Merbein	
1976	Owen Evans	South Mildura	
1977	Clive Bowden	Robinvale	
1978	Lou Young	Irymple	
1979	Ray Gard	Wentworth	
1980	Gerard Curran	Robinvale	
1981	Barry Hart	South Mildura	
1982	Rod Leslie	Robinvale	
1983	Glen Colihole	Mildura	
1984	Dennis Vining	Irymple	
1985	Murray Dyer &	South Mildura	
	Tim Walsh	Robinvale	
1986	Tim Walsh	Robinvale	
1987	Roy Skelton	Irymple	
1988	David Lloyd	Irymple	
1989	Fred Zappia	Robinvale	
1990	Adam Shelfhout	Mildura	
1991	Perry Hill	Imperials	
1992	Michael Clayden	Red Cliffs	
1993	Peter Dalziel	Imperials	
1994	David Collins	Red Cliffs	
1995	David Boots &	South Mildura	
	Chris McCallman	South Mildura	
1996	Ray Brougham	South Mildura	
1997	Fred Zappia	Robinvale	
1998	Steven Bowden &	Robinvale	
	Jason O'Brien	South Mildura	
1999	Nathan Yates	Wentworth	
2000	Ben Vecchiet		
2001	Shane Crossling		
2002	Rohan Hillier		
2003	John Bruynen		
2004	Matthew Baynes		
2005	Frank Dichiera		
2006	Robert Morgan		
2007	Stephen Gribble		
2008	Stephen Gribble		
2009	Robert McGlashan		
2010			
2011			
2012			
2013			
2014			
2015			
2016			
2017			
2018			
2019			
2020			
2021			
2022			
2023			
2024			
2025			

=== Under 18's ===
The Sunraysia Daily first donated a trophy for the Under 18 best and fairest award in 1952.

Sunraysia FNL: U/18 Best & Fairest Award:
Year	Best & Fairest	Club	Votes
1952	Les Innes	Mildura Rovers	29
1953	Leo Blesser	Mildura Rovers	
1954	John Mailes	Red Cliffs	
1955	1st: Len Mann &	Merbein	17
	2nd: B McKay	Merbein	17
1956	John West	Irymple	18
1957			

- 1955: B McKay (Merbein) finished 2nd under the old countback system.

=== Under 16's ===
The Sunraysia Daily first donated a trophy for the Under 16 best and fairest award in 1952.

Sunraysia FNL: U/16 Best & Fairest Award:
Year	Best & Fairest	Club	Votes
1952	Les Thompson	Merbein	23
1953	Ian Hinks	Merbein	
1954	Len Mann	Merbein	
1955	J Euvrard	Red Cliffs	22
1956	Hassa Mann	Merbein	29
1957			

== VFL / AFL Players ==
The following footballers played in either the Mildura FL and / or the Sunraysia FL prior to playing senior VFL / AFL football or drafted with the following clubs, with the year indicating their VFL debut -

- 1917 - Arthur Fox Sr: Red Cliffs to Richmond
- 1924 - Billy Pardon: Red Cliffs to Collingwood
- 1929 - Jack Cross: Merbein to Essendon
- 1925 - Charlie McSwain: Merbein to Carlton
- 1934 - Rex Byrne: Mildura to Fitzroy
- 1935 - George Winter: Irymple to Footscray
- 1936 - Laurie Leask: Mildura to South Melbourne
- 1937 - Jack Kelly: Red Cliffs to St Kilda
- 1939 - Harold Ball: Merbein to Melbourne
- 1939 - Ian Giles: Merbein to Melbourne
- 1943 - Mel Brown: Mildura to South Melbourne
- 1946 - Lance Arnold: Mildura to Melbourne
- 1946 - Mick McGlynn: Mildura to Geelong
- 1948 - Arthur Fox Jr: Red Cliffs to South Melbourne
- 1949 - Bernie Hogan: Merbein to Footscray
- 1950 - Herb Henderson: Imperials to Footscray
- 1953 - Brian Johnson: Mildura to North Melbourne
- 1953 - Don Keyter: Merbein to South Melbourne
- 1954 - Brian Dorman: Merbein to Collingwood
- 1954 - Ken McGown: Irymple to Richmond
- 1955 - Ian Hinks: Merbein to Hawthorn
- 1956 - Noel Dickson - Red Cliffs to Footscray
- 1956 - Ivan Smith: Robinvale to Fitzroy
- 1959 - Hassa Mann: Merbein to Melbourne
- 1959 - John R. O'Keefe: Imperials to Carlton
- 1960 - John Kilpatrick: Irymple to St Kilda
- 1960 - Len Mann: Merbein to Melbourne
- 1961 - Brian Holcombe: Imperials to Carlton
- 1962 - Elkin Reilly: Wentworth to South Melbourne
- 1964 - Ian Nankervis: Imperials to Carlton
- 1964 - Alan Teasdale: South Mildura to Geelong
- 1965 - Kevin Stevens: Imperials to Footscray
- 1966 - Tony Haenen: Imperials to South Melbourne
- 1966 - Max Pitt: Imperials to Collingwood
- 1966 - Dick Vandenberg: Robinvale to Carlton
- 1967 - Len Cumming: Imperials to Footscray
- 1967 - Chris Fowler: Red Cliffs to Melbourne
- 1968 - Pat Curran: Robinvale to Richmond
- 1968 - Keith Smythe: Merbein to Richmond
- 1970 - Mark Amos: Robinvale to Carlton
- 1970 - Greg Hollick: Irymple to Richmond
- 1971 - Daryl Cumming: South Mildura to Richmond
- 1971 - Bruce Tschirpig: Wentworth to Richmond
- 1975 - Allan Edwards: Robinvale to Richmond
- 1975 - Noel Jenkinson: Red Cliffs to Richmond
- 1977 - Mark Lee: Mildura to Richmond
- 1978 - Jeff Berry: Red Cliffs to Richmond
- 1978 - Phil Bottams: Imperials to Richmond
- 1978 - Dale Weightman: Imperials to Richmond
- 1981 - Doug Cox: South Mildura to St Kilda
- 1981 - Geoff Martin: Mildura to Richmond
- 1982 - Allan Hassell: Red Cliffs to St Kilda
- 1982 - Phil Egan: Robinvale to Richmond
- 1983 - Jamie Siddons: Robinvale to Sydney Swans
- 1983 - Brian Winton: Wentworth to Richmond
- 1985 - Rohan Robertson: Imperials to North Melbourne
- 1985 - Shane Robertson: Imperials to North Melbourne
- 1986 - Brendan Bower:Mildura to Richmond
- 1987 - Darren Bower: Mildura to Richmond
- 1988 - Greg Hamilton: Red Cliffs to Richmond
- 1988 - Matthew Knights: Merbein to Richmond
- 1989 - Michael James: Robinvale to Carlton
- 1989 - Heath Shephard: Robinvale to Collingwood
- 1990 - Sean Bowden: Imperials to Richmond
- 1991 - Nathan Bower: Mildura to Richmond
- 1991 - Matthew Croft: Imperials to Footscray
- 1991 - Jamie Lawson: Wentworth to Sydney Swans
- 1991 - Tony Modra: Red Cliffs to Adelaide
- 1992 - Brett Sholl: Irymple to Carlton
- 1993 - Paul Prymke: Mildura to Melbourne
- 1995 - Jason Akermanis: South Mildura to Brisbane Lions
- 1996 - Brent Frewen: South Mildura to Fitzroy
- 1998 - Mark Alvey: Wentworth to Essendon
- 1998 - Chris Tarrant: South Mildura to Collingwood
- 1998 - Richie Vandenberg: Wentworth to Hawthorn
- 1999 - Andrew Embley: Robinvale to Western Bulldogs
- 1999 - Adam Goodes: Merbein to Sydney Swans
- 1999 - Heath James: Wentworth to Sydney Swans
- 2001 - Josh Hunt: Imperials to Geelong
- 2001 - Daniel Elstone: Wentworth to Hawthorn
- 2004 - Colin Sylvia: Merbein to Melbourne
- 2006 - Ben McGlynn: Wentworth to Hawthorn
- 2008 - Robbie Tarrant: South Mildura to North Melbourne
- 2010 - Matt Dea: Imperials to Richmond
- 2012 - Sam Kerridge: Mildura to Adelaide
- 2014 - Ariel Steinberg: Imperials to Essendon
- 2017 - Kobe Mutch: Wentworth to Essendon
- 2018 - Jarrod Brander: Wentworth to Western Bulldogs
- 2018 - Derek Eggmolesse-Smith: Wentworth to Richmond
- 2018 - Lochie O'Brien: South Mildura to Carlton
- 2020 - Dylan Stephens: Red Cliffs to Sydney
- 2021 - Seamus Mitchell: Robinvale to Hawthorn
- 2022 - Josh Carmichael: Merbein to Collingwood
- 2025 - Sam Davidson: South Mildura to Footscray

The following senior VFL players came to play and or coach in the SFNL, with the year indicating their first season in the SFNL.

- 1945 - Jack Doherty: North Melbourne to Imperials
- 1947 - Ralph Shalless: Melbourne to University
- 1950 - Les Griggs: Essendon to Mildura
- 1952 - Alan Hickinbotham: Geelong to Irymple
- 1952 - Bob Rouse: Melbourne to Merbein
- 1953 - Ron McEwin: Essendon to Mildura
- 1953 - Ron Savage: Carlton to Red Cliffs
- 1954 - Harry Equid: Essendon to South Mildura
- 1954 - Jack Evans: St Kilda to Irymple
- 1954 - Lindsay Turnbull: Hawthorn to Irymple
- 1956 - Bill Brodie: North Melbourne to South Mildura
- 1956 - Edward Jackson: Melbourne to Imperials
- 1957 - Frank Slater: Richmond to Red Cliffs
- 1960 - Alan White: Carlton to Imperials
- 1963 - Derek Cowen: North Melbourne to Irymple
- 1963 - John James: Carlton to Robinvale
- 1974 - Alan Richardson: Richmond to Irymple
- 1975 - Maurie Fowler: Carlton to Robinvale
- 1977 - Michael Bowden: Richmond to Red Cliffs
- 1980 - Mark Cross: Footscray to Red Cliffs
- 2001 - Paul Evans: Port Adelaide to Robinvale
- 2002 - Merv Neagle: Sydney to Merbein
- 2010 - Shannon Motlop - Melbourne to Robinvale

== Leading goalkickers ==
Senior Football

Mildura Football League: Leading Goal Kicker
Year	Club Player	SFL Club	Season goals	Finals goals	Total goals
1924	Stan Pike	Mildura	30	1	31
1925	Stan Pike &	Mildura	45	2	47
	Carthy Tonzing	South Merbein	45	2	47
1926	Stan Pike	Mildura	72	5	77
1927	Hec Henderson	South Merbein	51	3	54
1928	Hec Henderson	South Merbein	52	2	54
1930	F Smith	Red Cliffs	66	3	69
1932	Hec Henderson	South Merbein	47	7	54
1934	Syd Nichols	Mildura	79	6	85
1936	G McWilliams	Imperials	100	10	110
1938	Ian Giles	Workers	103	10	113
Sunraysia Football League (1945 to present day)
1945	Neil McManus	Red Cliffs	114	7	121
1946	Neil McManus	Red Cliffs	51	N/A	51
1947	Barry Moore	Imperials	46	0	46
1948	Jack Doherty	Merbein	56	7	63
1949	Jack Gleeson	Imperials	116	2	118
1950	1st: Jack Gleeson	Imperials	118	13	131
	2nd: Jim McKechnie	Red Cliffs	104	8	112
1951	Lance Simpson	Merbein	68	0	68
1952	Ross Burr	Mildura	74	16	90
1953	Jim McKechnie &	Red Cliffs	31	10	41?
	Ross Burr	Mildura	31	6	37
1954	Ross Burr	Mildura	58	9	67
1955	Ross Burr	Mildura	73	5	78
1956	Jim McKechnie	Red Cliffs	64	0	64
1957	David Gathercole	Irymple	71	4	75
1958	Stan Nokes	Merbein	110	11	133
1959	John Jessup	Irymple	73	5	78
1960	Ken Whitecross	Mildura	71	6	77
1961	John Jessup	Irymple	81	4	85
1962	John Jessup	Irymple	71	4	75
1963	John Jessup	Irymple	71	0	71
1964	Merv Summerfield	Imperials	47	0	47
1965	Peter Mitchell	Merbein	71	0	71
1966	Ross Burr	Irymple	56	0	56
1967	Alan Rowarth	Robinvale	79	0	79
1968	Alan Rowarth	Robinvale	59	0	59
1969	Graham Bland	Merbein	83	5	88
1970	Graham Bland	Merbein	87	0	87
1971	Graham Bland	Merbein	83	0	83
1972	Graham Bland	Merbein	106	0	106
1973	John Thompson	Wentworth	79	0	79
1974	Graham Bland	Merbein	100	5	105
1975	Graham Bland	Merbein	121	14	135
1976	Frank Curran	Robinvale	67	1	68
1977	Graham Bland	Merbein	107	4	111
1978	Alan McDonald	Imperials	85	4	89
1979	Peter Woodford	Red Cliffs	105	5	110
1980	Colin Chester	Mildura	139	15	154
1981	Colin Chester	Mildura	69	0	69
1982	Colin Chester	South Mildura	104	13	117
1983	John Price	Imperials	73	1	74
1984	Trevor Sutton	Robinvale	154	9	163
1985	John Price	Imperials	105	0	105
1986	Craig Earnshaw	Irymple	87	6	93
1987	Phillip Nash	Imperials	98	0	98
1988	Heath Shepherd	Robinvale	72	4	76
1989	Pat Healy	Robinvale	99	8	107
1990	Phillip Nash	Imperials	78	8	86
1991	Michael Dean	Wentworth	88	0	88
1992	Jasmin Baryzcka	Mildura	76	0	76
1993	Michael Johnston	Red Cliffs	109	3	112
1994	Chris Pohlner	South Mildura	96	8	104
1995	Michael Bilucaglia	South Mildura	107	14	121
1996	Dallas Kalms	Wentworth	78	15	93
1997	Dallas Kalms	Wentworth	111	11	122
1998	Michael Bilucaglia	South Mildura	85	13	98
1999	Toby Cardew	Mildura	71	0	71
2000	Robert Lindsey	Red Cliffs	124	10	134
2001	Paul Evans	Robinvale	119	0	119
2002	Brenton McMasters	Merbein	94	0	94
2003	Jason Bell	Red Cliffs	77	0	77
2004	Jason Bell	Red Cliffs	96	11	107
2005	Jason Bell	Wentworth	90	9	99
2006	Brett Haase	South Mildura	79	0	79
2007	Jason Bell	Wentworth	98	6	104
2008	Michael Faulkhead	Red Cliffs	77	0	77
2009	Michael Faulkhead	Red Cliffs	111	6	117
2010	Bradley O'Connor	Robinvale	115	17	132
2011	Carmelo Lando	Wentworth	103	11	114
2012	Carmelo Lando	Wentworth	74	6	80
2013	Michael Faulkhead	Red Cliffs	65	8	73
2014	Troy Moncur	Red Cliffs	62	11	73
2015	Jason Eagle	Irymple	117	6	123
2016	William Farrer	Ouyen United	54	10	64
2017	William Farrer	Ouyen United	90	3	93
2018	Thomas Morrish	Ouyen United			45
2019	Wade Handcock	Wentworth			55
2020	SFNL in recess >	COVID-19			
2021	Nick Pezzaniti	Irymple	44	N/A	44
2022	Wade Handcock	Wentworth	68	8	76
202	Isaiah Johnson	Robinvale	86	3	89
2024	Jarrod Brander	Wentworth	68	24	92
2025	Noah Pegoraro	Mildura	66	2	67
2026	Luke Reynolds	Mildura	42	9	51
2027					

Most Goals kicked in a match by an individual

- 29 - Hec Shaw (Red Cliffs) v South Merbein, 1938
- 27 - Hec H Henderson (South Merbein) v Cullullerane, 193?
- 24 - Ian Giles (Workers) v South Merbein, 1938
- 20 - G McWilliams - (Imperials) v Coomealla, 8 August 1936
- 20 - Neil McManus (Red Cliffs) v Mildura South, Rd.2, 3 May 1947
- 20 – Paul Evans (Robinvale) v South Mildura, 2001
- 20 - Jarrod Arentz (Wentworth Districts) v South Mildura, 2001
- 19 - Stan Pike (Merbein) v Mildura, 1945
- 18 - Neil McManus (Red Cliffs) v Imperials, 4 August 1945

Juniors

In 1934, Hec Shaw (Red Cliffs FC) kicked 100 plus goals, including a bag of 22 goals against Benetook FC.

Under 16

- 25 - Neil "Nishy" Weight - (Irymple), 1951

== Netball ==
Netball within the Sunraysia Football League commenced in 1991, initially with an A. Grade competition which was won by Imperials. Other netball divisions commenced in -

- A. Grade: 1991
- B. Grade: 1992
- C. Grade: 2008
- C. Reserve: 2011
- Under 17's - Division One: 2002
- Under 15's - Division One: 2005
- Under 13's - Division One: 2008
- Under 17's - Division Two: 2010
- Under 15's - Division Two: 2010
- Under 13's - Division Two: 2010

The official SFNL website has an extensive list of all netball premierships and best and fairest winners in all grades.

== Final Five Finals System ==
Round	Match	Name	Team 1		Team 2
1	A	Elimination final	Rank 4	v	Rank 5
1	B	Qualifying final	Rank 2	v	Rank 3
2	C	1st semi-final	Loser B	v	Winner A
2	D	2nd semi-final	Rank 1	v	Winner B
3	E	Preliminary final	Loser D	v	Winner C
4	F	Grand final	Winner D	v	Winner E

As its name states, the McIntyre final five system features five teams. From the second round the McIntyre final five system is the same as the Page–McIntyre system; however, in the first round the lowest-two-ranked teams play to eliminate one team and the second and third-ranked teams determine which match they will play in the second round. The highest-ranked team has a bye in the first round.

In this case, if all teams have an even chance of winning each match, the highest-ranked team has a 37.5% chance, ranks two and three have a 25% chance and the lowest-two-ranked teams have a 6.25% chance of winning the competition.

== 2022 Ladder ==
Sunrayia FL	Wins	Byes	Losses	Draws	For	Against	%	Pts	Final	Team	G	B	Pts	Team	G	B	Pts
Irymple	13	0	3	0	1351	786	171.88%	52	Elimination	0	0	0	0	0	0	0	0
Wentworth	12	0	4	0	1387	909	152.59%	48	Qualifying	0	0	0	0	0	0	0	0
Ouyen United	11	0	5	0	1317	915	143.93%	44	1st Semi	Ouyen United	10	11	71	Robinvale-Euston	9	7	61
Robinvale-Euston	11	0	5	0	1311	999	131.23%	44	2nd Semi	Wentworth	10	9	69	Irymple	6	11	47
Imperials	8	0	8	0	1128	992	113.71%	32	Preliminary	Wentworth	8	10	58	Ouyen United	6	10	46
Merbein	8	0	8	0	1101	1141	96.49%	32	Grand	Irymple	10	5	65	Wentworth	8	11	59
Red Cliffs	5	0	11	0	1024	1544	66.32%	20									
Mildura	4	0	12	0	890	1365	65.20%	16									
South Mildura	0	0	16	0	739	1597	46.27%	0									

== 2023 Ladder ==
Sunrayia FL	Wins	Byes	Losses	Draws	For	Against	%	Pts	Final	Team	G	B	Pts	Team	G	B	Pts
Robinvale-Euston	15	0	1	0	1593	950	167.68%	60	Elimination	0	0	0	0	0	0	0	0
Mildura	12	0	4	0	1452	980	148.16%	48	Qualifying	0	0	0	0	0	0	0	0
Irymple	12	0	4	0	1367	959	142.54%	48	1st Semi	Irymple	17	13	115	Wentworth	6	10	46
Wentworth	9	0	7	0	1255	1171	107.17%	36	2nd Semi	Robinvale-Euston	10	10	70	Mildura	9	8	62
Red Cliffs	9	0	7	0	1267	1242	102.01%	36	Preliminary	Irymple	14	18	102	Mildura	7	7	49
Ouyen United	7	0	9	0	1150	1236	93.04%	28	Grand	Irymple	8	14	62	Robinvale-Euston	4	9	33
Merbein	6	0	10	0	1280	1229	104.15%	24									
South Mildura	1	0	14	1	922	1809	50.97%	6									
Imperials	0	0	15	1	811	1521	53.32%	2									

== 2024 Ladder ==
Sunrayia FL	Wins	Byes	Losses	Draws	For	Against	%	Pts	Final	Team	G	B	Pts	Team	G	B	Pts
Imperials	14	0	1	1	1338	855	156.49%	58	Elimination	Mildura	7	10	52	Robinvale-Euston	3	4	22
Wentworth	13	0	3	0	1251	845	148.05%	52	Qualifying	Irymple	13	14	92	Wentworth	14	6	90
Irymple	11	0	5	0	1298	913	142.17%	44	1st Semi	Wentworth	9	11	65	Mildura	3	6	24
Robinvale-Euston	11	-3	5	0	1371	931	147.26%	32	2nd Semi	Imperials	10	8	68	Irymple	8	8	56
Mildura	8	0	8	0	1071	968	110.64%	32	Preliminary	Wentworth	13	11	89	Irymple	6	9	45
Red Cliffs	6	0	10	0	1063	1226	86.70%	24	Grand	Imperials	6	11	47	Wentworth	6	8	44
Merbein	4	0	12	0	986	1113	88.59%	16									
Ouyen United	2	0	13	1	705	1479	47.67%	10									
South Mildura	2	0	14	0	718	1471	48.81%	8									

- Robinvale lose 12 pts for 2023 player points breaches.

== 2026 Ladder ==
Sunrayia FL	Wins	Byes	Losses	Draws	For	Against	%	Pts	Final	Team	G	B	Pts	Team	G	B	Pts
Mildura	11	0	5	0	1300	1030	126.21%	44	Elimination	South Mildura	8	12	60	Irymple	8	11	59
Red Cliffs	11	0	5	0	1139	1040	109.52%	44	Qualifying	Red Cliffs	8	10	58	Ouyen United	5	6	36
Ouyen United	10	0	6	0	1147	1052	109.03%	40	1st Semi	Ouyen United	9	9	63	South Mildura	9	10	64
Irymple	9	0	7	0	1130	1063	106.30%	36	2nd Semi	Mildura	13	7	85	Red Cliffs	9	7	61
South Mildura	8	0	8	0	1131	1042	108.54%	32	Preliminary	Red Cliffs	11	7	73	South Mildura	4	4	28
Robinvale Euston	8	0	8	0	1255	1157	108.47%	32	Grand	Mildura				Red Cliffs			
Merbein	8	0	8	0	1276	1205	105.89%	32									
Imperials	4	0	12	0	848	1302	65.13%	16									
Wentworth	3	0	13	0	1036	1371	75.57%	12									
