= Christopher Fowler (disambiguation) =

Christopher Fowler is an English writer.

Christopher Fowler may also refer to:

- Christopher Fowler (Medal of Honor) (1850–?), United States Navy sailor
- Christopher Fowler (minister) (1610–1678), English ejected minister
- Chris Fowler (born 1962), American sports journalist
- Chris Fowler (footballer) (born 1948), Australian footballer
- Christopher J. Fowler Archaeologist

== See also ==
- Christopher Brocklebank-Fowler (1934–2020), British politician
