= Arthur Fox =

Arthur Fox may refer to:

- Arthur Fox (fencer) (1878–1958), English-American fencer
- Arthur Fox Sr. (1894–1933), Australian rules footballer
- Arthur Fox Jr. (1924–1953), Australian rules footballer
- Arthur Aloysius Fox (1847–1901), landowner and politician in the colony of South Australia
- Arthur Fox (nightclub owner) (1907–1970), striptease impresario
- Arthur Fox (bishop), bishop of Sale (1967–1981) in Victoria, Australia
