= George Winter =

George Winter may refer to:

- George Winter (artist) (1810–1876), English-born painter of American frontier life
- George Winter (Australian politician) (1815–1879), pastoralist and member of the Victorian Legislative Council
- George Winter (baseball) (1878–1951), a.k.a. "Sassafras", Major League Baseball player
- George D. Winter (1927–1981), British doctor and medical pioneer
- George Winter (footballer) (1908–1972), Australian rules footballer

== See also ==
- George Wintour, grandson of Robert Wintour, see Wintour baronets
