= Leonard Mann =

Leonard Mann may refer to:

- Leonard Mann (writer), Australian poet and novelist
- Leonard Mann (actor), American social worker, writer, and former actor

== See also ==
- Len Mann, Australian rules footballer
