= Rouning =

Rouning may refer to:

- Johannes Rouning, US Navy seaman and Medal of Honor recipient
- The Rouning, or Rounwytha, a mystical, largely-female sect within Order of Nine Angles Satanism
