= Jeff Berry =

Jeff Berry may refer to:

- Jeff Berry (baseball agent) (born 1969), American attorney and baseball agent
- Jeff Berry (footballer) (born 1957), Australian rules footballer
- Jeff Lynn Berry (c. 1949–2013), American leader in the Ku Klux Klan
- Jeff Berry (mixologist) (born c. 1958), American writer and historian of Tiki culture

== See also ==
- Jeff Barry (born 1938) American singer-songwriter and record producer
- Jeff Barry (baseball) (born 1969), American baseball outfielder
