= Ian Giles (footballer) =

Australian rules footballer (1918–2002)

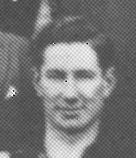

Personal information
- Full name: Ian Giles
- Born: 25 July 1918
- Died: 13 August 2002 (aged 84)
- Original team: Mildura
- Height: 179 cm (5 ft 10 in)
- Weight: 80 kg (176 lb)

Playing career^{1}
Years	Club	Games (Goals)
1939	Melbourne	6 (0)
- ^{1} Playing statistics correct to the end of 1939.

Ian Giles (25 July 1918 – 13 August 2002) was an Australian rules footballer who played with Melbourne in the Victorian Football League (VFL).

In 1938, Giles kicked 24 goals in a match for the Workers Football Club (Mildura FC) against South Merbein Football Club in the Mildura Football League and finished with 103 goals for the year, plus ten more goals during the finals.
