= Jack Evans (footballer, born 1930) =

Australian rules footballer (born 1930)

Personal information
- Full name: John Alfred Evans
- Born: 11 October 1930
- Died: 15 January 2015 (aged 84)
- Original team: Camden

Playing career^{1}
Years	Club	Games (Goals)
1951–52	St Kilda	16 (4)
- ^{1} Playing statistics correct to the end of 1952.

Jack Alfred Evans (11 October 1930 – 15 January 2015) was an Australian rules footballer who played with St Kilda in the Victorian Football League (VFL).

Evans played with Irymple in the Sunraysia Football League in 1954. In 1955, Evans was reluctantly cleared to South Mildura, but only after an appeal of the clearance from Irymple.

Evans played in the Sunraysia Football League's representative side in 1955.

Evans won the 1959 Sunraysia Football League's best and fairest award, the McLeod Medal.
