= Christian Osepins =

United States Medal of Honor recipient

- Christiaan Osephius
- Born: 4 March 1858; Schiedam, Netherlands
- Died: October 8, 1887 (aged 29); Schiedam, Netherlands
- Burial place: Cemetery on the Broersvest, Schiedam
- Military career
- Allegiance: United States of America
- Branch: United States Navy
- Rank: Seaman
- Unit: USS Fortune
- Awards: Medal of Honor

Christian Osepins (1858–1887) was a Dutch-born United States Navy sailor and a recipient of the United States military's highest decoration, the Medal of Honor.

== Biography ==
Osepins was born "Christiaan Osephius" in Schiedam to Gerritje Ruigrok and Johannes Osephius. Osephius immigrated to the United States and joined the Navy from New York as Christian Osepins. By May 7, 1882, he was serving as a Seaman on the USS Fortune. On that day, while Fortune was at Hampton Roads, Virginia, he and another sailor, Ordinary Seaman Johannes Rouning, jumped overboard and rescued Gunner's Mate James Walters from drowning.

For this action, both Osepins and Rouning were awarded the Medal of Honor two and a half years later, on October 18, 1884. Osepins had not claimed his medal as of 1898, and the decoration remained in the possession of the Navy Department.

Osepins's official Medal of Honor citation reads:

For jumping overboard from the U.S. Tug Fortune, 7 May 1882, at Hampton Roads, Va., and rescuing from drowning James Walters, gunner's mate.

Osepns died only 3 years later and was buried in his hometown of Schiedam.

== See also ==
- List of Medal of Honor recipients in non-combat incidents
