= Billy Pardon =

Australian rules footballer, born 1903

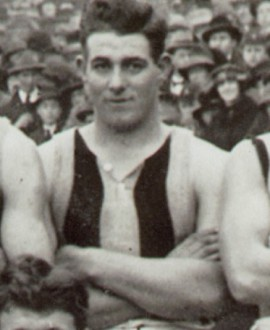
- Pardon in 1924

Personal information
- Full name: William John Pardon
- Born: 25 September 1903; Daylesford, Victoria
- Died: 17 November 1969 (aged 66); Parkville, Victoria
- Original team: Red Cliffs
- Height: 176 cm (5 ft 9 in)
- Weight: 86 kg (190 lb)
- Position: half back flanker

Playing career^{1}
Years	Club	Games (Goals)
1924	Collingwood	1 (0)
- ^{1} Playing statistics correct to the end of 1924.

William John Pardon (25 September 1903 – 17 November 1969) was an Australian rules footballer who played with Collingwood in the Victorian Football League (VFL).

== Family ==
The son of John Albert Pardon (1877-1947), and Francesca "Frances" Pardon (1875-1931), née Brocchi, William John Pardon was born at Daylesford, Victoria on 25 September 1903.

He married Delza May Lupton (1909-2004) in 1929.

== Football ==
Recruited from the Red Cliffs Football Club in the Mildura and District Football League, he attended pre-season training with Collingwood in 1924.

Pardon debuted for Collingwood against Richmond at the Punt Road Oval in round eight on Saturday, 14th June 1924.

== Death ==
He died at Parkville, Victoria on 17 November 1969.
