= Hassa Mann =

Australian rules footballer (born 1940)

Personal information
- Full name: Harold Peter Mann
- Born: 9 October 1940 (age 86)
- Original teams: Merbein, Rutherglen
- Height: 177 cm (5 ft 10 in)
- Weight: 76 kg (168 lb)

Playing career^{1}
Years	Club	Games (Goals)
1959–1968	Melbourne	178 (193)
1969–1971	South Fremantle	62 (133)
Total		240 (326)
- ^{1} Playing statistics correct to the end of 1968.

Career highlights
- Club: 3× VFL premiership: 1959, 1960, 1964; 3× Keith 'Bluey' Truscott Medallist 1962, 1963, 1967; 2× Melbourne leading goalkicker: 1967, 1968; Harold Ball Memorial Trophy: 1959; Melbourne captain: 1965–68; Melbourne Team of the Century–Half-forward; Melbourne Hall of Fame; Overall: All-Australian: 1966; Australian Football Hall of Fame

Harold Peter "Hassa" Mann (born 9 October 1940) is a former Australian rules footballer who played for and captained Melbourne in the VFL during the 1960s. He earned the name Hassa when he was a toddler, from his cousin and future Melbourne footballer Len Mann.

Mann was originally from Merbein, where he was best on ground in the 1955 Sunraysia Football League Under 16 grand final and in the 1956 Sunraysia Football League Under 16 grand final, when he kicked six goals. He also won the 1956 Sunraysia Football League's Under 16 best and fairest award with 29 votes.

A centreman, Mann was recruited from Rutherglen in the Ovens & Murray Football League after playing senior football in 1958 and kicking 38 goals.

Mann made his VFL debut for Melbourne in round one in their premiership season of 1959. He was a premiership player again the following season and went on to become the club captain in 1965, a position he kept for four seasons.

Mann finished in the top 10 of the Brownlow Medal count four times, including placing equal 7th in 1966 and equal 5th in 1967. He won Melbourne's Best and Fairest back to back in 1962 and 1963, and for a third time in 1967. He also twice topped their goalkicking, doing so as captain in 1967 and 1968. For his performance for Victoria in the 1966 Hobart Carnival he earned All-Australian selection.

After finishing his VFL career in Victoria he became captain-coach at South Fremantle, in Western Australia in the WAFL, winning a best and fairest in his debut season and captain-coaching that club to a Premiership in his second year, 1970.

Mann coached Caulfield in the Victorian Football Association in 1981, and he was coach of the 1982 Eltham premiership team.

In 2000 he was named at the half forward flank in Melbourne's official 'Team of the Century'. He was inducted into the Australian Football Hall of Fame in 2013.

His cousin is Len Mann, 1960 VFL Premiership player and team-mate.

== Playing statistics ==
Legend
G	Goals	K	Kicks	D	Disposals	T	Tackles
B	Behinds	H	Handballs	M	Marks

Season	Team	No.	Games	Totals							Averages (per game)						
Season	Team	No.	Games	G	B	K	H	D	M	T	G	B	K	H	D	M	T
1959	Melbourne	29	17	21	—N/a	—N/a	—N/a	—N/a	—N/a	—N/a	1.2	—N/a	—N/a	—N/a	—N/a	—N/a	—N/a
1960	Melbourne	29	20	22	—N/a	—N/a	—N/a	—N/a	—N/a	—N/a	1.1	—N/a	—N/a	—N/a	—N/a	—N/a	—N/a
1961	Melbourne	29	20	26	—N/a	—N/a	—N/a	—N/a	—N/a	—N/a	1.3	—N/a	—N/a	—N/a	—N/a	—N/a	—N/a
1962	Melbourne	29	20	8	—N/a	—N/a	—N/a	—N/a	—N/a	—N/a	0.4	—N/a	—N/a	—N/a	—N/a	—N/a	—N/a
1963	Melbourne	29	20	6	—N/a	—N/a	—N/a	—N/a	—N/a	—N/a	0.3	—N/a	—N/a	—N/a	—N/a	—N/a	—N/a
1964	Melbourne	29	19	15	—N/a	—N/a	—N/a	—N/a	—N/a	—N/a	0.8	—N/a	—N/a	—N/a	—N/a	—N/a	—N/a
1965	Melbourne	29	14	9	8	241	46	287	61	—N/a	0.6	0.6	17.2	3.3	20.5	4.4	—N/a
1966	Melbourne	29	14	19	15	294	242	52	69	—N/a	1.4	1.1	17.3	3.7	21.0	4.9	—N/a
1967	Melbourne	29	17	38	20	325	66	391	79	—N/a	2.2	1.2	19.1	3.9	23.0	4.6	—N/a
1968	Melbourne	29	18	29	21	345	71	416	95	—N/a	1.6	1.2	19.2	3.9	23.1	5.3	—N/a
Career			178	193	64	1153	235	1388	304	—N/a	1.1	1.0	18.3	3.7	22.0	4.8	—N/a
