= Brian Dorman =

Australian rules footballer

Personal information
- Full name: Brian Dorman
- Born: 2 July 1937
- Died: 27 July 2012 (aged 75)
- Original team: Merbein
- Height: 191 cm (6 ft 3 in)
- Weight: 90 kg (198 lb)
- Position: Centre Half Forward

Playing career^{1}
Years	Club	Games (Goals)
1954–60	Collingwood	51 (28)
- ^{1} Playing statistics correct to the end of 1960.

Brian Dorman (2 July 1937 – 27 July 2012) was an Australian rules footballer who played with Collingwood in the Victorian Football League (VFL).

Dorman was recruited from Merbein Football Club where he played in the 1950 Sunraysia Football League's Under 16 premiership.

Dorman's suffered a career-ending knee injury early in the 1960 preliminary final.
