= Laurie Leask =

Australian rules footballer (1912–1981)

Personal information
- Full name: Laurence Leask
- Born: 14 June 1912; Deniliquin, New South Wales
- Died: 7 May 1981 (aged 68); Mildura, Victoria
- Original team: Mildura
- Height: 164 cm (5 ft 5 in)
- Weight: 67 kg (148 lb)

Playing career^{1}
Years	Club	Games (Goals)
1936–1937	South Melbourne	11 (11)
- ^{1} Playing statistics correct to the end of 1937.

Laurie Leask (14 June 1912 – 7 May 1981) was an Australian rules footballer who played with South Melbourne in the Victorian Football League (VFL).

Leask of South Melbourne won the 1936 VFL Reserves best and fairest award and also South Melbourne Reserves' best and fairest award too.

Leask returned to the Mildura Football League to play with the Workers FC in 1938.

Leask won the 1934 (Pollock Medal) and 1938 (Snow Trophy) for the best and fairest award in the Mildura Football League.

Leask won the 1935 Mildura Football Club best and fairest award and the 1938 Workers Football Club best and fairest award.

Leask was captain-coach of Mildura's 1946 Sunraysia Football League premiership team.
