= Michael Bowden (footballer) =

Australian rules footballer (1947–2020)

- Bowden playing for Richmond in the VFL

Personal information
- Full name: Michael John Bowden
- Born: 21 March 1947
- Died: 11 April 2020 (aged 73)
- Original team: St Kevin's College
- Height: 185 cm (6 ft 1 in)
- Weight: 94 kg (207 lb)
- Position: Ruck-rover

Playing career^{1}
Years	Club	Games (Goals)
1967–1971	Richmond	59 (20)
- ^{1} Playing statistics correct to the end of 1971.

Career highlights
- VFL premiership player: 1969; VFL reserves premiership captain: 1971; Richmond reserves captain: 1970–71

Michael John Bowden OAM (21 March 1947 – 11 April 2020) was an Australian rules football player and Indigenous advocate. Bowden played 59 matches for the Richmond Football Club in the VFL between 1967 and 1971. Following his playing career he became an educator in the Northern Territory and a passionate advocate for Indigenous communities, for which he received a Medal of the Order of Australia (OAM).

== Football career ==
Bowden attended St Kevins College where he won the school's 1964 best and fairest and at the same time played for the Richmond under 19s program before quitting to study as a priest at Corpus Christi College. He left the seminary after two years and returned to Richmond, where he made his senior league debut in round 8 of the 1967 season, playing as a ruck-rover.

Bowden was a premiership player in 1969, after leading the league with 194 handballs that season.

He was appointed the club's reserves-grade captain the following season and lead that team to a reserves premiership in the 1971 season.

Bowden was captain-coach of Red Cliffs Football Club in the Sunraysia Football League from 1977 to 1979 and won the Sunraysia Football League's best and fairest award, the McLeod Medal in 1978.

== Post-football career, family and illness ==
Bowden became a teacher, and eventually principal, of remote community schools for Indigenous Australian students in the Northern Territory. He was awarded a Medal of the Order of Australia (OAM) for service to the Indigenous community of the Northern Territory in January 2020.

Bowden had three sons who went on to play for Richmond in Sean, Joel and Patrick. Two more sons, Rhett and Kane, played for the Port Melbourne Football Club in the VFA.

Bowden suffered from motor neuron disease in later life and died from the affliction on 11 April 2020.

== VFL statistics ==
Legend
G	Goals	K	Kicks	D	Disposals	T	Tackles
B	Behinds	H	Handballs	M	Marks

Season	Team	No.	Games	Totals							Averages (per game)						
Season	Team	No.	Games	G	B	K	H	D	M	T	G	B	K	H	D	M	T
1967	Richmond	11	7	2	3	69	30	99	20	-	0.3	0.4	9.9	4.3	14.1	2.9	-
1968	Richmond	11	15	3	9	160	146	306	38	-	0.2	0.6	10.7	9.7	20.4	2.5	-
1969	Richmond	11	20	6	4	185	194	379	87	-	0.3	0.2	9.3	9.7	19.0	4.4	-
1970	Richmond	11	12	4	3	100	118	218	55	-	0.3	0.3	8.3	9.8	18.2	4.6	-
1971	Richmond	11	5	5	0	18	25	43	10	-	1.0	0.0	3.6	5.0	8.6	2.0	-
Career			59	20	19	532	513	1045	210	-	0.3	0.3	9.0	8.7	17.7	3.6	-
