= Frank Slater =

Australian rules footballer

Personal information
- Full name: Colin Frank Slater
- Born: 12 April 1934
- Died: 17 May 2000 (aged 66)
- Original team: Ringwood
- Height: 178 cm (5 ft 10 in)
- Weight: 81 kg (179 lb)

Playing career^{1}
Years	Club	Games (Goals)
1953–55	Richmond	19 (0)
- ^{1} Playing statistics correct to the end of 1955.

Colin Frank Slater (12 April 1934 – 17 May 2000) was a former Australian rules footballer who played with Richmond in the Victorian Football League (VFL).

Slater played at Ringwood for three years in the Eastern Suburban Football League, then onto Richmond in 1953.

Slater won the Richmond reserves best and fairest in 1954.

Slater was captain-coach of Red Cliffs in the Sunraysia Football League from 1957 to 1961, coaching them to a flag in 1959 and runners up in 1960. Slater also won the 1957 Sunraysia Football League's best and fairest award, the McLeod Medal.

Slater then coached Tatura in the Goulburn Valley Football League in 1961 and 1962, before taking on the captain-coach role at Mangoplah in 1963.
