= Sam Kerridge =

Australian rules footballer (born 1993)

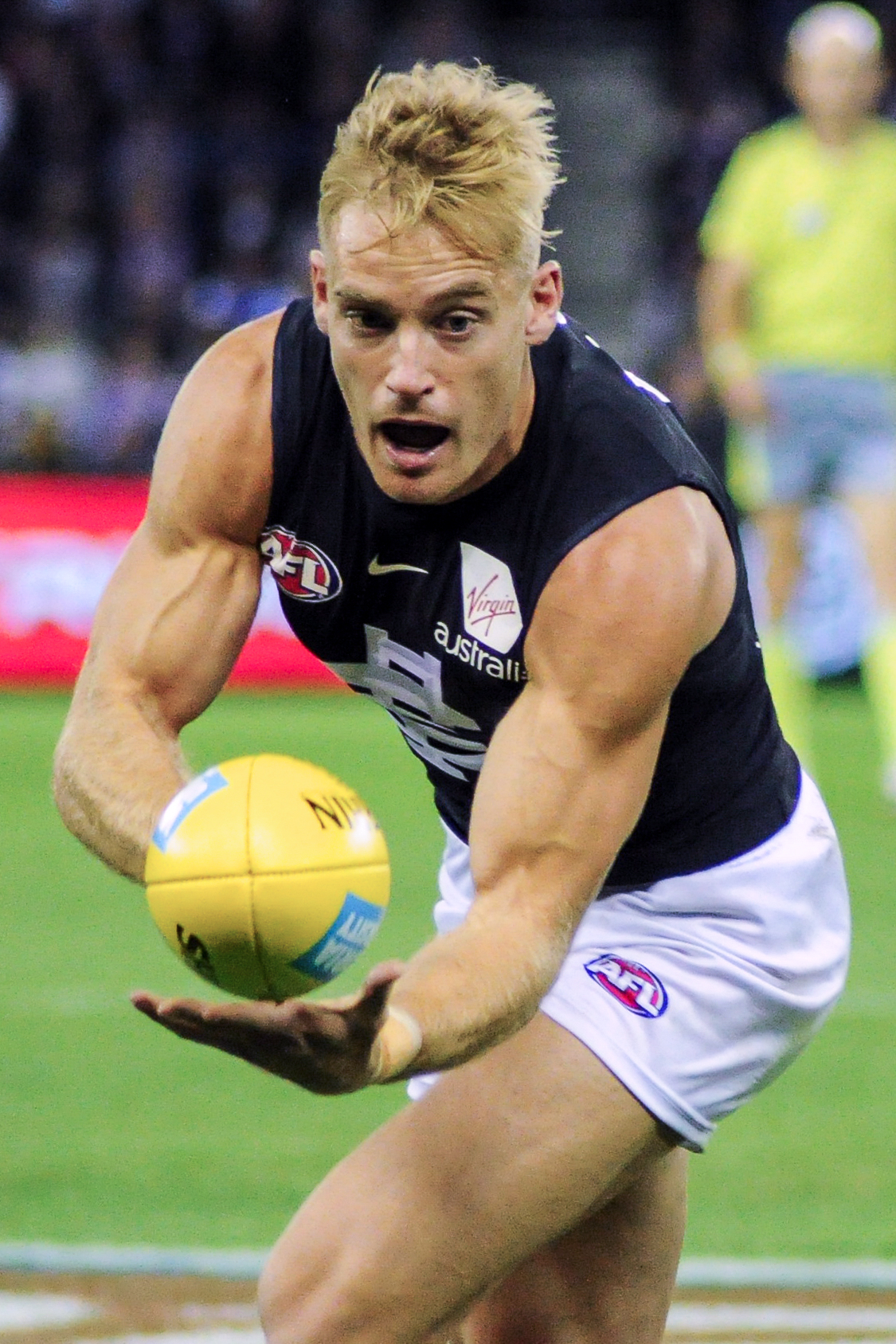
- Kerridge playing for Carlton in April 2018

Personal information
- Full name: Sam Kerridge
- Nickname: Kedge
- Born: 26 April 1993 (age 33); Mildura, Victoria
- Original teams: Mildura (SFL); Bendigo Pioneers (TAC Cup)
- Draft: No. 27, 2011 National Draft, Adelaide
- Debut: Round 3, 2012, Adelaide vs. Hawthorn, at MCG
- Height: 188 cm (6 ft 2 in)
- Weight: 85 kg (13 st 5 lb; 187 lb)
- Position: Midfielder, tagger, small forward

Playing career^{1}
| Years | Club | Games (Goals) |
| 2012–2015 | Adelaide | 27 (23) |
| 2016–2018 | Carlton | 42 (12) |
| Total | | 69 (35) |
- ^{1} Playing statistics correct to the end of 2018.

Career highlights
- 2013 AFL Rising Star nominee

Sam Kerridge (born 26 April 1993) is a former professional Australian rules football player who played for the Adelaide and Carlton Football Club in the Australian Football League (AFL). He was recruited with pick 27 in the 2011 National Draft.

== AFL career ==
Kerridge made his AFL debut in Round 3, 2012, against Hawthorn, starting as the substitute, and did not play another game in a successful year for the side. In 2013, Kerridge played 11 games and established himself as one of Adelaide's main taggers, nullifying the impact of key opposition players including Chris Judd, Ryan Griffen and Grant Birchall. He also showed promise as an offensive player, most notable against North Melbourne in round 9 where he helped the Crows claim a thrilling come from behind win with 6 goals and 24 disposals, for which he was awarded an AFL Rising Star nomination. His performance has gone down in history as one of Adelaide's most unlikely heroes.

Kerridge played 14 games in 2014 either side of a mid-season foot injury. He continued to rotate between tagging duties (in the absence of regular tagger Nathan van Berlo) and an opportunist small forward role. His best performance was against North Melbourne once more, in round 13, when he kicked four goals.

In October 2015, Kerridge was traded to the Carlton Football Club along with pick 28 in exchange for Troy Menzel. He immediately found a regular place in the Carlton midfield, playing all but one game for the season and finishing tenth in the best and fairest.

== Statistics ==
Correct to the end of the 2018 season.

Legend
| G | Goals | K | Kicks | D | Disposals | T | Tackles |
| B | Behinds | H | Handballs | M | Marks |

| Season | Team | No. | Games | Totals | | | | | | | Averages (per game) | | | | | | |
| Season | Team | No. | Games | G | B | K | H | D | M | T | G | B | K | H | D | M | T |
|---|---|---|---|---|---|---|---|---|---|---|---|---|---|---|---|---|---|
| 2012 | Adelaide | 29 | 1 | 0 | 0 | 0 | 3 | 3 | 0 | 0 | 0.0 | 0.0 | 0.0 | 3.0 | 3.0 | 0.0 | 0.0 |
| 2013 | Adelaide | 29 | 11 | 13 | 5 | 82 | 79 | 161 | 55 | 31 | 1.2 | 0.5 | 7.5 | 7.2 | 14.6 | 5.0 | 2.8 |
| 2014 | Adelaide | 17 | 14 | 10 | 1 | 72 | 84 | 156 | 33 | 52 | 0.7 | 0.1 | 5.1 | 6.0 | 11.1 | 2.4 | 3.7 |
| 2015 | Adelaide | 17 | 1 | 0 | 0 | 2 | 6 | 8 | 0 | 1 | 0.0 | 0.0 | 2.0 | 6.0 | 8.0 | 0.0 | 1.0 |
| 2016 | Carlton | 11 | 21 | 6 | 14 | 210 | 238 | 448 | 99 | 70 | 0.3 | 0.7 | 10.0 | 11.3 | 21.3 | 4.7 | 3.3 |
| 2017 | Carlton | 11 | 11 | 2 | 2 | 120 | 118 | 238 | 55 | 48 | 0.2 | 0.2 | 10.9 | 10.7 | 21.6 | 5.0 | 4.4 |
| 2018 | Carlton | 11 | 10 | 4 | 3 | 117 | 94 | 211 | 60 | 31 | 0.4 | 0.3 | 11.7 | 9.4 | 21.1 | 6.0 | 3.1 |
| Career | | | 69 | 35 | 25 | 603 | 622 | 1225 | 302 | 233 | 0.5 | 0.4 | 11.7 | 9.0 | 21.1 | 6.0 | 3.1 |

== Personal life ==
It has been reported that Sam Kerridge has Chinese ancestry. Kerridge is a descendant of John Ai Egge, who came to Australia from Shanghai in 1852.
