= Bruce Tschirpig =

Australian rules footballer

Personal information
- Full name: Bruce Ernest Tschirpig
- Born: 11 October 1949 (age 77)
- Original team: Wentworth
- Height: 180 cm (5 ft 11 in)
- Weight: 76 kg (168 lb)

Playing career^{1}
Years	Club	Games (Goals)
1969–1970	Wentworth	? (?)
1971, 1976	Richmond	10 (12)
1972–1975	Latrobe	? (?)
1976–1978	East Fremantle	30 (25)
1980–1981	Perth	25 (27)
- ^{1} Playing statistics correct to the end of 1981.

Bruce Tschirpig (born 11 October 1949) is a former Australian rules footballer who played for Richmond in the Victorian Football League (VFL) during the 1970s.

Tschirpig grew up on the family farm south of Moorook, South Australia, and attended Loxton High School. After moving to Wentworth, New South Wales, he won the McLeod Medal in 1969 and 1970 as the Best and Fairest player in the Sunraysia Football League. This brought attention from Richmond. He made eight appearances in the 1971 VFL season which included a four-goal haul in a win over Carlton at the Melbourne Cricket Ground to celebrate Roger Dean's 200th game. Although he played in Richmond's final home and away season fixture, Tschirpig was not called upon for the finals.

He left for Latrobe the following season and while playing for the Tasmania club represented the state at the 1975 Knockout Carnival. At the end of the season competed in the prestigious Burnie Gift, a handicap sprint, and finished second on 1 January 1976. Richmond lured him back in 1976 but he could only add two further games to his tally and finished his career in Western Australia where he played at East Fremantle and Perth.
