= Stephen Richardson =

Australian rules footballer

Personal information
- Full name: Stephen Noel Richardson
- Born: 16 March 1959 (age 67)
- Original team: Mayne
- Height: 180 cm (5 ft 11 in)
- Weight: 79 kg (174 lb)

Playing career^{1}
Years	Club	Games (Goals)
1983	Essendon	1 (2)
1984–1993	Swan Districts	92 (38)
1987–1989	Norwood	55 (30)
1990–1992	East Perth	41 (15)
Total		189 (85)
- ^{1} Playing statistics correct to the end of 1993.

Stephen Neil Richardson (born 16 March 1959) is a former Australian rules footballer who played with Essendon, Swan Districts, East Perth and Norwood.

Richardson was from Western Australia, but started his career in Queensland, at the Mayne Australian Football Club. From there he went to Victorian Football League club Essendon, where he played one league game in 1983, their round 20 win over Melbourne at the Melbourne Cricket Ground. Coming off the interchange bench, Richardson had 16 disposals and kicked two goals. He was a member of Essendon's 1983 reserves premiership team.

In 1984, Richardson returned to Perth and joined Swan Districts in the West Australian Football League. He played in their 1984 Grand Final win over East Fremantle. The following year he represented Western Australia in an interstate match against South Australia at Subiaco Oval. He went to South Australian National Football League side Norwood in 1987 and played there for three years, making 55 senior appearances. After another stint at Swan Districts, Richardson crossed to East Perth in 1990 and played 41 league games for the club. He had one final season with Swan Districts in 1993.

His twin brother, Mike, also played for Essendon and Swans Districts, as well as Collingwood and the Brisbane Bears.
