= Bob Rowse =

Australian rules footballer

Personal information
- Full name: Robert Leslie Rowse
- Born: 8 September 1926
- Died: 5 May 2016 (aged 89)
- Original team: Ormond
- Height: 183 cm (6 ft 0 in)
- Weight: 83 kg (183 lb)

Playing career^{1}
Years	Club	Games (Goals)
1951	Melbourne	6 (0)
- ^{1} Playing statistics correct to the end of 1951.

Robert Leslie Rowse (8 September 1926 – 5 May 2016) was an Australian rules footballer who played with Melbourne in the Victorian Football League (VFL).

== Family ==
He married Betty Mary McGill (1928–2021) in 1950. They had three children.

== Cricket ==
He played in 40 first grade matches for the Prahran Cricket Club over six seasons (1945/6 to 1950/51), scoring a total of 798 runs (average 18.55; highest score 77).

In 1954, as the opening bat for a combined Mildura side, playing against a combined Ballarat side, he scored 108 in 141 minutes, with 15 4's — this was the top score for the 1954 Melbourne Country Cricket Week competition.

== Football ==
Rowse was recruited from Ormond in the Victorian Amateur Football Association after they won the 1950 A. Grade premiership. Rouse was also selected in the 1950 Victorian Amateur Representative team.

Rowse won the 1956 Sunraysia Football League best and award, the McLeod Memorial Medal.
