= USS Fortune (1865) =

Tugboat of the United States Navy

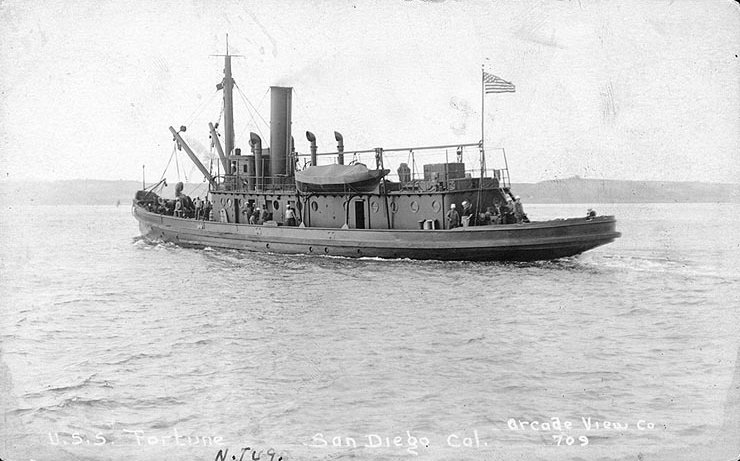
- USS Fortune off San Diego, California prior to World War I

History
- Name: USS Fortune
- Builder: James Tetlow (Boston, MA)
- Launched: 25 March 1865
- Commissioned: 19 May 1871
- Decommissioned: 7 May 1922
- Fate: sold 22 May 1922

General characteristics
- Displacement: 450 tons
- Length: 137 ft (42 m)
- Beam: 26 ft (7.9 m)
- Draft: 9 ft 6 in (2.90 m)
- Propulsion: steam engine
- Speed: 10 knots (19 km/h)
- Armament: two 3-pounder guns

USS Fortune was a steam-powered tugboat that served in the United States Navy intermittently from 1871 to 1922. Built in 1865, she was the first ship so named. Fortune was classified as YT-11 on 17 July 1920. Through her lengthy career, she served as a harbor tug, fireboat, cargo transport, training ship, and submarine tender, among other duties.

She was launched on 25 March 1865 by James Tetlow of Boston, Massachusetts, and commissioned on 19 May 1871.

During her first period of commission, which lasted until 1 January 1873, Fortune was assigned to towing and freight transport services along the east coast of the United States. She then lay at Washington Navy Yard until being recommissioned on 1 June 1873. During the next 3 years, she trained cadet engineers of the Naval Academy, cruised in the Caribbean and Gulf of Mexico on survey duty and drills, and carried men from the east coast to New Orleans, as well as serving on harbor duty at many ports. On 11 May 1874, while off Veracruz, Mexico, one of her boats was capsized in a strong gale and four crewmen drowned. For his actions during the incident, Quartermaster Christopher Fowler was awarded the Medal of Honor. Fortune was again out of commission between 23 June 1876 and 21 September 1877, at Washington.

Again in commission until 7 June 1879, Fortune sailed out of the Norfolk Navy Yard, carrying cargo to Washington, on harbor duty, and occasionally serving as an icebreaker. On 7 May 1882 at Hampton Roads, Virginia, Ordinary Seaman Johannes Rouning and Seaman Christian Osepins jumped overboard and rescued a fellow sailor from drowning, for which they were awarded the Medal of Honor. Fortune was recommissioned on 30 March 1887 to carry cargo between ships and stations along the east coast until being decommissioned at Newport, Rhode Island, on 22 April 1891. She returned to commission from 15 December 1899 to 6 June 1901 to serve as a gunnery training vessel for naval apprentices at Newport, and as a gunnery tug out of Newport, New York, and Boston.

Again recommissioned on 23 October 1902, Fortune sailed to join the South Atlantic Squadron for operations around Puerto Rico, and on 20 May 1903, reached San Diego, California, for duty with the Pacific Squadron, sailing out of Bremerton, Washington, through the summer. On 2 August she arrived at Mare Island to serve as a submarine tender, joining in target practice and other fleet operations until going out of commission 10 April 1907.

In commission from 22 January 1908 to 29 May 1909, and again from 9 June 1909 until placed in reserve on 28 June 1912, Fortune continued her work with submarines. Placed in full commission for the last time 22 May 1915, she served as a station ship at Tutuila, American Samoa, using Pearl Harbor as her home yard, until being decommissioned at Tutuila on 7 May 1922. She was sold on 22 May of that year.
