= Jack Doherty (footballer, born 1921) =

Australian rules footballer (1921–1998)

Personal information
- Born: 10 March 1921
- Died: 16 February 1998 (aged 76)
- Original team: Ballarat
- Height: 178 cm (5 ft 10 in)
- Weight: 81 kg (179 lb)

Playing career^{1}
Years	Club	Games (Goals)
1945	North Melbourne	14 (0)
- ^{1} Playing statistics correct to the end of 1945.

Jack Doherty (10 March 1921 – 16 February 1998) was an Australian rules footballer who played with North Melbourne in the Victorian Football League (VFL).

Doherty was recruited from Ballarat.

Doherty was captain-coach of Imperials in the Sunraysia Football League in 1946, then coached Merbein to the 1948 premiership, then coached Imperials to the 1950 premiership.
