= Jamie Lawson (Australian footballer) =

Australian rules footballer

Personal information
- Full name: Jamie Lawson
- Born: 5 October 1971 (age 55)
- Original team: Wentworth
- Height: 168 cm (5 ft 6 in)
- Weight: 70 kg (154 lb)
- Position: Rover

Playing career^{1}
Years	Club	Games (Goals)
1991–1994	Sydney Swans	61 (29)
- ^{1} Playing statistics correct to the end of 1994.

Jamie Lawson (born 5 October 1971) is a former Australian rules footballer who played with the Sydney Swans in the Australian Football League (AFL) during the early 1990s.

Lawson, a rover, was recruited from the Sunraysia Football League. An Indigenous Australian, he arrived in what was a bad time for Sydney, with the club finishing with the wooden spoon in three of his four seasons. He had a career high 30 disposals and two goals against fellow cellar dwellers Brisbane at the SCG in 1992.

Aged only 22, his career came to an end late in the 1994 AFL season when he broke his leg at the Melbourne Cricket Ground, playing against Richmond. His fractured tibia led to compartment syndrome and he was forced to retire. He had been in good form prior to the injury, polling Brownlow Medal votes in his previous two games.
