= Patrick Bowden =

Australian rules footballer, born 1981

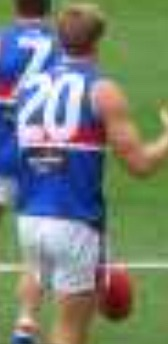
- Bowden before a game against Collingwood in April 2004

Personal information
- Born: 4 August 1981 (age 45)
- Original team: Rovers (NT)
- Debut: Round 17, 27 July 2001, Western Bulldogs vs. Richmond, at Telstra Dome
- Height: 191 cm (6 ft 3 in)
- Weight: 91 kg (201 lb)

Playing career^{1}
Years	Club	Games (Goals)
2001–2005	Western Bulldogs	50 (55)
2006–2007	Richmond	25 (15)
Total		75 (70)
- ^{1} Playing statistics correct to the end of 2007.

Patrick Bowden (born 4 August 1981) is a former Australian rules footballer in the Australian Football League.

== Football career ==
=== Western Bulldogs ===
In the 1999 National AFL draft, Bowden was a fourth-round selection (no. 58 overall) to the Western Bulldogs. With limited opportunities at the Bulldogs, he was traded at the end of the 2005 AFL season to the Richmond Football Club in return for the 55th pick in the 2005 AFL draft, which the Bulldogs used to select Brett Montgomery.

=== Richmond Football Club ===
In the 2006 AFL season, Bowden had his best season to date. He led Richmond's list for marks and was equal fourth for marks in the competition.

He was the fourth in his family to pull on the yellow-and-black (after father Michael and brothers Sean and Joel).

After a year full of injury and poor form, the Tigers delisted Bowden at the end of season 2007.
