= Greg Hollick =

Australian rules footballer

Personal information
- Full name: Gregory Russell Hollick
- Born: 7 October 1951 (age 75)
- Original team: Irymple
- Height: 185 cm (6 ft 1 in)
- Weight: 80 kg (176 lb)

Playing career^{1}
Years	Club	Games (Goals)
1970–1972	Richmond	38 (19)
- ^{1} Playing statistics correct to the end of 1972.

Gregory Russell Hollick (born 7 October 1951) is a former Australian rules footballer who played with Richmond in the Victorian Football League (VFL) and West Adelaide in the South Australian National Football League (SANFL) during the 1970s.

Hollick was a ruck rover, half back and occasional forward who joined Richmond from Sunraysia Football League club Irymple. He was a regular fixture in the team in 1971 when he played 19 games, including Richmond's semi final win and preliminary final loss. The following season he appeared in two further finals but was unable to make the premiership decider due to his national service training.

Although signed by Melbourne in 1973, Hollick instead ended up at West Adelaide in the SANFL. He won a Grogan Medal while at Queensland club Mayne in 1981.

Hollick's daughter Monique Hollick was drafted by Adelaide Football Club at the 2016 AFL Women's draft.
