= Lindsay Turnbull =

Australian rules footballer

Personal information
- Full name: Lindsay Wallace Turnbull
- Born: 9 October 1930
- Died: 22 November 2023 (aged 93)
- Original team: Kew / East Suburban Churches
- Height: 183 cm (6 ft 0 in)
- Weight: 80 kg (176 lb)

Playing career^{1}
Years	Club	Games (Goals)
1951	Hawthorn	3 (0)
- ^{1} Playing statistics correct to the end of 1951.

Lindsay Wallace Turnbull (9 October 1930 – 22 November 2023) was an Australian rules footballer who played with Hawthorn in the Victorian Football League (VFL).

Turnbull played with Irymple in the Sunraysia Football League in 1954 and won the Sunraysia FL best and fairest award and was best on ground in Irymple's premiership win.
