= Mayne Australian Football Club =

Australian rules football club

Mayne

Names
- Full name: Mayne Australian Football Club
- Nickname: Tigers
- Club song: Tigerland

2025 season

Club details
- Founded: 1924; 102 years ago
- Colours
- Competition: QFA Division 1
- President: Campbell Shaw
- Coach: Jack Gartlan
- Captain(s): Ryan Doolan & Daniel Schmidt
- Ground: Enoggera Memorial Park

Uniforms
Home

Mayne Australian Football Club is an Australian rules football club based in the Brisbane suburb of Enoggera. The club colours are black and gold and they are nicknamed the Tigers.

It is the most successful club in the history of the Queensland Australian Football League, Queensland's highest level of competition, with 15 premierships from the 1920s to the 1980s. The clubs most recent premiership was in 1982, with a Grand Final appearance in 1985. However, after a long drought of success, and following its exclusion from the competition in 1999, it struggled to remain competitive with the state's top clubs. As a result, the club's men's team currently competes in the second level below the QAFL, QFA Division 1, and the women's team competes in QFAW Division 2.

== History ==
They joined the Queensland Football League in 1925 and played in the top tier of Queensland football until 1999. After the 1999 season the club was actually excluded from the competition, whereupon it entered into a legal battle with the AFL which ended up in the Federal Court. Ultimately, Mayne was successful - a unique achievement for such a comparatively small club - and the 2001 season found it reinstated, with damages, the league was renamed the Queensland State League. Mayne struggled in the four years winning only 5 of 72 games and finishing last in all four years.

It moved into the Pineapple Hotel Cup competition in 2005 and managed to play in an Elimination final. Since then the club has struggled, finishing last in 2007, 2010 and 2011.

Starting in 2014 Mayne compete in the QFA North competition. To be noted Mayne Tigers were undefeated in 2014, 18–0 in the regular season and winning the Major Semi-final and Grand Final against Noosa Football club.

This was followed by another successful campaign in 2015 with the Tigers finishing the season with a 16–2 regular season record followed by straight wins in the semi-final and Grand Final to beat the Maroochydore Roos in what came down to a nail biting 4th quarter. Mayne continued this terrific record going back-to-back-to-back with a third successive Seniors and Reserves premiership. The 2016 premiership was won over the Maroochydore Roos for the second year in a row.

== Notable players ==
Footballers to have played for the club include:

- Jason Akermanis (Brisbane Bears/Lions & Footscray/Western Bulldogs)
- Richard Champion (Brisbane Bears/Lions)
- Mick Nolan (North Melbourne Kangaroos)
- Stephen Richardson (Essendon Bombers)

== Honours ==
=== Club ===
- Queensland Australian Football League (21): 1927, 1928, 1930, 1931, 1934, 1935, 1942, 1952,
  1958, 1961, 1962, 1966, 1967, 1973, 1982, 2014 (QFA North), 2015 (QFA North), 2016 (QFA North), 2024 (QFA Div 1), 2025 (QFA Div 1), 2026 (QFA Div 1)

=== Individual ===
Grogan Medalists (3)

- Peter Ives 1978
- Greg Hollick 1981
- Terry Simmonds 1987

Duncanson Todd Medal (3)

- Andrew Housego 2005
- Luke Faulkner 2014
- Caleb Brown 2015

Club Single season Goal Kicking Records

- Ryan Doolan 73 2025 QFA Div 1
- Zac Quin 81 2024 QFA Div 1
- Luke Faulkner 136 2014 QFA North
- Dale Woodhall 113 1983 QAFL
