= Mel Brown (footballer) =

Australian rules footballer

Personal information
- Full name: Melville Brown
- Born: 12 November 1911; Footscray, Victoria
- Died: 23 August 1995 (aged 83)
- Original team: Mildura
- Height: 188 cm (6 ft 2 in)
- Weight: 81 kg (179 lb)

Playing career^{1}
Years	Club	Games (Goals)
1943	South Melbourne	1 (0)
- ^{1} Playing statistics correct to the end of 1943.

Melville Brown (12 November 1911 – 23 August 1995) was an Australian rules footballer who played with South Melbourne in the Victorian Football League (VFL).

Brown was recruited from the Mildura Football Club in the Mildura Football League in 1943.
