= Les Griggs =

Australian rules footballer, born 1914

Personal information
- Full name: Les T. Griggs
- Born: 6 May 1914
- Died: 28 May 1990 (aged 76)
- Original teams: Yarragon, Jeparit
- Height: 180 cm (5 ft 11 in)
- Weight: 80 kg (176 lb)
- Position: Centre half forward/Centreman

Playing career^{1}
Years	Club	Games (Goals)
1933–35, 1939–44	Essendon	99 (52)

Coaching career
Years	Club	Games (W–L–D)
1941	Essendon	1 (1–0–0)
- ^{1} Playing statistics correct to the end of 1944.

Les Griggs (6 May 1914 – 28 May 1990) was an Australian rules footballer who played with Essendon in the Victorian Football League (VFL) during the 1930s and 1940s.

Griggs, from Yarragon originally, was mostly a centreman and centre half forward over the course of his career at Essendon. A teacher, he missed a couple of seasons due to his work, costing him a place in the 100 club as he finished his career with 99 games. He had his best year in 1941 when he kicked 29 goals and played in Essendon's losing 1941 VFL Grand Final team. Griggs also acted as caretaker coach for one game that year.

Grigg won Essendon's 1944 Roy Laing Cup for their best player in the VFL finals series.

Griggs was captain-coach of a number of rural clubs, which included premierships at - Kenmore (1936), Kerang, Bairnsdale and Mildura.

Grigg coached Mildura from 1950 to 1956, which included premierships in 1951, 1952 and 1955, plus grand final losses in 1953 and 1954.

== Links ==
- Les Griggs's playing statistics from AFL Tables
- Holmesby, Russell and Main, Jim (2007). The Encyclopedia of AFL Footballers. 7th ed. Melbourne: Bas Publishing.
