= Arthur Fox Jr. =

Australian rules footballer

Arthur Fox

Personal information
- Full name: Arthur Henry Fox
- Born: 26 March 1924
- Died: 15 June 1953 (aged 29); Mildura, Victoria, Australia
- Original team: Red Cliffs
- Height: 177 cm (5 ft 10 in)
- Weight: 72 kg (159 lb)

Playing career^{1}
Years	Club	Games (Goals)
1948–1950	South Melbourne	39 (14)
- ^{1} Playing statistics correct to the end of 1950.

Arthur Henry Fox Jr. (26 March 1924 – 15 June 1953) was an Australian rules footballer who played with South Melbourne in the Victorian Football League (VFL).

The son of Richmond Football Club player Arthur Fox, Sr., Fox arrived in Melbourne from Red Cliffs. His best season came in 1949 when he played 18 of a possible 19 games for South Melbourne. A wingman, he was selected to represent the VFL interstate team that year in Adelaide.

Once his time at South Melbourne ended he returned to Red Cliffs as coach for two seasons, in 1951 and 1952. Fox won the 1951 Sunraysia Football League best and fairest award.

He joined Wimmera Football League club Rupanyup in 1953 but his time with them was short. On 15 June 1953, Fox was driving from Rupanyup on the Calder Highway when he crashed his motor cycle, near Ouyen. He was rushed to a hospital in Mildura but never regained consciousness and died aged 29.
