= Mick McGlynn =

Australian rules footballer

Personal information
- Full name: Michael Edward McGlynn
- Born: 12 February 1922; Red Cliffs, Victoria
- Died: 24 September 2007 (aged 85)
- Original team: Mildura
- Height: 178 cm (5 ft 10 in)
- Weight: 83 kg (183 lb)

Playing career^{1}
| Years | Club | Games (Goals) |
| 1946 | Geelong | 6 (1) |
- ^{1} Playing statistics correct to the end of 1946.

Michael Edward McGlynn (12 February 1922 – 24 September 2007) was an Australian rules footballer who played with Geelong in the Victorian Football League (VFL).

Prior to playing with Geelong, McGlynn served in both the Australian Army and the Royal Australian Air Force during World War II.
