= Sean Bowden =

Australian rules footballer and lawyer

Personal information
- Born: 22 September 1970 (age 56)
- Original team: Mildura Imperials
- Draft: No. 103 (F/S), 1988 national draft
- Debut: Round 1, 31 March 1990, Richmond vs. Brisbane Bears, at Carrara
- Height: 183 cm (6 ft 0 in)
- Weight: 82 kg (181 lb)

Playing career^{1}
Years	Club	Games (Goals)
1990–1991	Richmond	6 (0)
- ^{1} Playing statistics correct to the end of 1991.

Sean Bowden (born 22 September 1970) is a former Australian rules footballer, later a lawyer. He played for the Richmond Football Club in the Australian Football League (AFL) and Port Melbourne in the Victorian Football Association in 1990 and 1991.

A Law (Honors) graduate from the University of Melbourne, who grew up in Central Australia. Bowden was drafted by Richmond with pick 103 in the 1988 VFL draft and started the 1990 AFL season by becoming the 920th player to debut with the Tigers. He played the first five games of the season and then one final game in 1991. Bowden was the second in his family to pull on the yellow-and-black following father Michael who was a 1969 Premiership player. Later brothers Joel and Patrick also played for Richmond.

Sean Bowden is the founding partner of Darwin-based law firm Bowden McCormack Lawyers, which provides high-level legal services across Northern Australia. The firm is noted for acting for Aboriginal traditional owners in regional development and native title matters with Bowden recognised by Chambers Partners as a Band 1 practitioner . Bowden has appeared in significant matters before the High Court and Federal Court and has extensive experience in the negotiation of mining agreements on Aboriginal land, and Indigenous Land Use Agreements generally

In native title Bowden acted for the claimants in Yunupingu on behalf of the Gumatj Clan or Estate Group v Commonwealth of Australia [2023] FCAFC 75, a landmark case concerning native title and compensation. The matter was heard in the High Court as Commonwealth of Australia v Yunupingu [2025] HCA 6, and the court found in favour of the Gumatj clan.

Bowden is a former AFL player for the Richmond Football Club and since 2020 has been Chair of AFL Northern Territory (AFLNT), having been appointed in 2020. As chair, Bowden has led the work towards a bid for a 20th AFL licence for the Northern Territory Government releases 10-year business case for NT AFL team, and the construction of new infrastructure in the Northern Territory including a new City Stadium in Darwin

Under his leadership as AFLNT chair, Bowden continues to be a public advocate for the Northern Territory's bid to secure the AFL's twentieth licence, launching in 2024 a ten-year business case that outlined economic, social, and infrastructure benefits for hosting an NT-based AFL team. In 2024, Bowden was named the inaugural NT News Leader of the Year, having also won the award's Corporate Leader category, recognising his contributions across business and community sectors
