= Christopher Fowler (Medal of Honor) =

United States Navy sailor

- Born: c. 1850; New York
- Military career
- Allegiance: United States
- Branch: United States Navy
- Rank: Quartermaster
- Unit: USS Fortune
- Awards: Medal of Honor

Christopher Fowler (born c. 1850, date of death unknown) was a United States Navy sailor and a recipient of the United States military's highest decoration, the Medal of Honor.

== Biography ==
Born in New York in about 1850, Fowler joined the Navy from that state. By May 11, 1874, he was serving as a quartermaster on the USS Fortune. On that day, while Fortune was off the coast of Punta Zapotitlán, Veracruz, Mexico, one of the ship's small boats was sent towards shore. A strong gale arose and the boat was capsized by the rough surf; four of the crew drowned but at least two were rescued. The four crewmen who died were Seaman John McInnis, Seaman Richard Norker, Landsman James Daley and Landsman John Moran. For his "gallant conduct" during the incident, Fowler was awarded the Medal of Honor.

Fowler's official Medal of Honor citation reads:

Served on board the U.S.S. Fortune off Point Zapotitlan, Mexico, 11 May 1874. On the occasion of the capsizing of one of the boats of the Fortune and the drowning of a portion of the boat's crew, Fowler displayed gallant conduct.

== See also ==
- List of Medal of Honor recipients during peacetime
