= Ian Hinks =

Australian rules footballer

Personal information
- Full name: Ian Hinks
- Born: 17 April 1937 (age 89)
- Original team: Merbein
- Height: 183 cm (6 ft 0 in)
- Weight: 86 kg (190 lb)

Playing career^{1}
Years	Club	Games (Goals)
1955–58	Hawthorn	16 (3)
- ^{1} Playing statistics correct to the end of 1958.

Ian Hinks (born 17 April 1937) is a former Australian rules footballer who played with Hawthorn in the Victorian Football League (VFL).
