= Johannes Rouning =

Norwegian-American sailor (1859–??)

- Born: Johannes Petersen Rønning; 11 May 1859; Trondheim, Norway
- Military career
- Allegiance: United States
- Branch: United States Navy
- Rank: Ordinary Seaman
- Unit: USS Fortune
- Awards: Medal of Honor

Johannes Rouning (born Rønning; 11 May 1859 – ) was a United States Navy sailor and a recipient of the United States military's highest decoration, the Medal of Honor. He was born in Norway in May 1859 and emigrated in 1881, at age 23 and became a U.S. citizen in 1892.

On May 7, 1882, Rouning was serving as an ordinary seaman on the USS Fortune at Hampton Roads, Virginia. On that day, he and another sailor, Seaman Christian Osepins, jumped overboard and rescued Gunner's Mate James Walters from drowning. For this action, both Rouning and Osepins were awarded the Medal of Honor two and a half years later, on October 18, 1884.

Rouning's official Medal of Honor citation reads:

For jumping overboard from the U.S. Tug Fortune, 7 May 1882, at Hampton Roads, Va., and rescuing from drowning James Walters, gunner's mate.

== See also ==
- List of Medal of Honor recipients during peacetime
