= Mark Alvey =

Australian rules footballer

Personal information
- Born: 10 June 1980 (age 46)
- Original team: Wentworth / Bendigo Pioneers
- Debut: Round 10, 1998, Western Bulldogs vs. West Coast Eagles, at WACA
- Position: Wingman

Playing career^{1}
Years	Club	Games (Goals)
1998–2003	Western Bulldogs	45 (28)
2004–2005	Essendon	14 (3)
Total		59 (31)
- ^{1} Playing statistics correct to the end of 2005.

Career highlights
- 1999 AFL Finals Series

Mark Garry Alvey (born 10 June 1980) is a former Australian rules football player who was drafted by the Western Bulldogs in the 1997 draft from the Bendigo U18s. He is originally from Curlwaa in Southern New South Wales brother of the Notorious Salt Bush, SGT at Arms of the Yabbies MC Curlwaa Chapter; Mark earned a football scholarship to move to Bendigo at the age of 16. A small player (height 176 cm), he was used mostly as a midfielder, rotating through the forward pocket. He never managed to make it into the Western Bulldogs’ best 18 on a consistent basis, which is not surprising considering that his rivals for positions in that part of the ground during this period included Tony Liberatore, Scott West and Jose Romero. He played 45 games in 6 seasons.

In 2004 he was picked up by Essendon Bombers in the draft where he managed 14 games in two seasons as a forward.
