= Len Mann =

Australian rules footballer (born 1938)

Personal information
- Born: 21 August 1938 (age 88)
- Original team: Merbein
- Debut: Round 2, 1960, Melbourne vs. St Kilda, at Junction Oval
- Height: 192 cm (6 ft 4 in)
- Weight: 89 kg (196 lb)

Playing career^{1}
| Years | Club | Games (Goals) |
| 1960–1964 | Melbourne | 46 (5) |
- ^{1} Playing statistics correct to the end of 1964.

Len "Moose" Mann (born 21 August 1938) is a former Australian rules footballer who played for Melbourne in the VFL during the early 1960s.

Mann, originally from Merbein, where he won the Sunraysia Football League's Under 16 best and fairest award in 1954, the Under 18 award in 1955 and Merbein Football Club's reserves best and fairest award in 1956.

Mann was Melbourne's first choice ruckman in their 1960 VFL premiership side.

Mann was captain-coach of Warrnambool between 1965 and 1967, leading them to the 1966 Hampden Football League premiership and runners up in 1965.

His cousin Harold played beside him in the 1960 VFL premiership side, better known as 'Hassa' which was a nickname Len gave him as a child.

== Links ==
- Len Mann's playing statistics from AFL Tables
- Demonwiki Player Profile
- Holmesby, Russell and Main, Jim (2007). The Encyclopedia of AFL Footballers. 7th ed. Melbourne: Bas Publishing.
