= Chris Fowler (footballer) =

Australian rules footballer

Personal information
- Full name: Chris Fowler
- Born: 28 August 1948 (age 78)
- Original team: Red Cliffs
- Height: 193 cm (6 ft 4 in)
- Weight: 92 kg (203 lb)
- Position: Ruck

Playing career^{1}
Years	Club	Games (Goals)
1967–69	Melbourne	23 (3)
- ^{1} Playing statistics correct to the end of 1969.

Chris Fowler (born 28 August 1948) is a former Australian rules footballer who played with Melbourne in the Victorian Football League (VFL).
