= Arthur Fox Sr. =

Australian rules footballer

Arthur Fox

Personal information
- Full name: Arthur Henry Fox
- Born: 21 January 1894; Collingwood, Victoria, Australia
- Died: 13 January 1933 (aged 38); Mildura, Victoria, Australia
- Original team: Red Cliffs

Playing career^{1}
Years	Club	Games (Goals)
1917–1918	Richmond	5 (1)
- ^{1} Playing statistics correct to the end of 1918.

Arthur Fox Sr. (21 January 1894 – 13 January 1933) was an Australian rules footballer who played for the Richmond Football Club in the Victorian Football League (VFL).

Fox's son, Arthur Fox Jr. later played for the South Melbourne Swans in the VFL.
