= Jeff Berry (footballer) =

Australian rules footballer

Personal information
- Full name: Jeff Berry
- Born: 25 March 1957 (age 69)
- Original team: Red Cliffs
- Height: 183 cm (6 ft 0 in)
- Weight: 80 kg (176 lb)

Playing career^{1}
Years	Club	Games (Goals)
1978–79	Richmond	10 (0)
1980–82	Footscray	35 (4)
Total		45 (4)
- ^{1} Playing statistics correct to the end of 1982.

Jeff Berry (born 25 March 1957) is a former Australian rules footballer who played with Richmond and Footscray in the Victorian Football League (VFL). His debut was on August 26th, 1978, Round 21, against Fitzroy. His last game was on August 25th, 1979, Round 21, against Geelong.
