= George Winter (footballer) =

Australian rules footballer, born 1908

Personal information
- Full name: George Winter
- Born: 27 February 1908
- Died: 10 May 1972 (aged 64)
- Original team: Irymple

Playing career^{1}
Years	Club	Games (Goals)
1935	Footscray	2 (0)
- ^{1} Playing statistics correct to the end of 1935.

George Winter (27 February 1908 – 10 May 1972) was a former Australian rules footballer who played with Footscray in the Victorian Football League (VFL).
