= Electoral results for the district of Narracan =

Victoria, Australia, district election results

This is a list of electoral results for the district of Narracan in Victorian state elections.

== Members for Narracan ==
Member	Party	Term
Jim Balfour	Liberal	1967–1982
John Delzoppo	Liberal	1982–1996
Florian Andrighetto	Liberal	1996–1999
Ian Maxfield	Labor	1999–2006
Gary Blackwood	Liberal	2006–2022
Wayne Farnham	Liberal	2023–present

== Election results ==
=== Elections in the 2020s ===
==== 2023 supplementary election ====
2023 Narracan state supplementary election
Party	Candidate	Votes	%	±%
Liberal	Wayne Farnham	16,741	45.0	−10.6
Greens	Alyssa Weaver	4,132	11.1	+5.1
Independent	Tony Wolfe	4,110	11.0	+11.0
Democratic Labour	Sophia Camille De Wit	2,641	7.1	+7.1
Freedom	Leonie Blackwell	2,254	6.1	+6.1
One Nation	Casey Murphy	2,246	6.0	+6.0
Independent	Annemarie McCabe	1,437	3.9	+3.9
Liberal Democrats	Michael Abelman	1,325	3.6	+3.6
Family First	Brendan Clarke	1,089	2.9	+2.9
Animal Justice	Austin Cram	849	2.3	+2.3
Independent	Ian Honey	381	1.0	+1.0
Total formal votes		37,205	93.4	–1.4
Informal votes		2,619	6.6	+1.4
Registered electors		50,506		
Turnout		39,824	78.9	−5.9
Two-candidate-preferred result
Liberal	Wayne Farnham	23,448	63.0	+3.0
Independent	Tony Wolfe	13,757	37.0	+37.0
Liberal hold		Swing	+3.0	

Results after distribution of preferences
Party	Candidate	Votes	%	±%
Liberal	Wayne Farnham	19,230	51.7	
Independent	Tony Wolfe	6,891	18.5	
Greens	Alyssa Weaver	6,073	16.3	
Freedom	Leonie Blackwell	5,011	13.5	

=== Elections in the 2010s ===
==== 2018 ====
2018 Victorian state election: Narracan
Party	Candidate	Votes	%	±%
Liberal	Gary Blackwood	23,207	51.72	−3.48
Labor	Christine Maxfield	15,946	35.54	+6.08
Greens	William Hornstra	2,679	5.97	−2.99
Independent	Carlo Ierfone	1,613	3.59	+3.59
Independent	Guss Lambden	1,425	3.18	+3.18
Total formal votes		44,870	94.60	−1.17
Informal votes		2,559	5.40	+1.17
Turnout		47,429	90.85	−3.22
Two-party-preferred result
Liberal	Gary Blackwood	25,724	57.26	−4.03
Labor	Christine Maxfield	19,203	42.74	+4.03
Liberal hold		Swing	−4.03	

==== 2014 ====
2014 Victorian state election: Narracan
Party	Candidate	Votes	%	±%
Liberal	Gary Blackwood	22,907	55.2	−5.4
Labor	Kate Marten	12,223	29.5	+3.7
Greens	Malcolm McKelvie	3,720	9.0	+1.1
Country Alliance	Dave Snelling	1,673	4.0	−0.1
Rise Up Australia	Norman Baker	973	2.3	+2.3
Total formal votes		41,496	95.8	−0.2
Informal votes		1,829	4.2	+0.2
Turnout		43,325	94.1	+1.2
Two-party-preferred result
Liberal	Gary Blackwood	25,482	61.3	−4.7
Labor	Kate Marten	16,095	38.7	+4.7
Liberal hold		Swing	−4.7	

==== 2010 ====
2010 Victorian state election: Narracan
Party	Candidate	Votes	%	±%
Liberal	Gary Blackwood	21,636	56.67	+14.64
Labor	Tony Flynn	11,161	29.23	−10.62
Greens	Belinda Rogers	2,967	7.77	+0.61
Country Alliance	Brian Dungey	1,638	4.29	+4.29
Independent	Jenny Webb	777	2.04	+2.04
Total formal votes		38,179	96.14	+0.01
Informal votes		1,531	3.86	−0.01
Turnout		93.80	93.80	+0.01
Two-party-preferred result
Liberal	Gary Blackwood	23,814	62.39	+9.74
Labor	Tony Flynn	14,353	37.61	−9.74
Liberal hold		Swing	+9.74	

=== Elections in the 2000s ===
==== 2006 ====
2006 Victorian state election: Narracan
Party	Candidate	Votes	%	±%
Liberal	Gary Blackwood	14,720	42.0	+8.5
Labor	Ian Maxfield	13,956	39.8	−6.7
Greens	Kate Jackson	2,506	7.2	+1.3
National	John Verhoeven	2,065	5.9	−2.4
Family First	Terry McKenna	1,366	3.9	+3.9
People Power	Roger Marks	271	0.8	+0.8
Citizens Electoral Council	Steven Bird	138	0.4	+0.4
Total formal votes		35,022	96.1	−0.9
Informal votes		1,410	3.9	+0.9
Turnout		36,432	93.8	
Two-party-preferred result
Liberal	Gary Blackwood	18,440	52.7	+9.5
Labor	Ian Maxfield	16,582	47.3	−9.5
Liberal gain from Labor		Swing	+9.5	

==== 2002 ====
2002 Victorian state election: Narracan
Party	Candidate	Votes	%	±%
Labor	Ian Maxfield	15,908	46.5	+5.9
Liberal	Karen Stoll	11,469	33.5	−9.7
National	Ian Needham	2,840	8.3	+7.1
Greens	Kate Jackson	2,033	5.9	+5.9
Independent	Tony Sayers	1,995	5.8	+5.8
Total formal votes		34,245	97.0	+0.1
Informal votes		1,044	3.0	−0.1
Turnout		35,289	94.6	
Two-party-preferred result
Labor	Ian Maxfield	19,471	56.8	+7.4
Liberal	Karen Stoll	14,794	43.2	−7.4
Labor gain from Liberal		Swing	+7.4	

=== Elections in the 1990s ===
==== 1999 ====
1999 Victorian state election: Narracan
Party	Candidate	Votes	%	±%
Labor	Ian Maxfield	13,074	45.6	+3.7
Liberal	Florian Andrighetto	11,925	41.6	−5.8
Democrats	Michael Fozard	1,534	5.3	+5.3
Shooters	Colin Dowling	1,292	4.5	+4.5
Independent	Ray Mathieson	504	1.8	+1.8
Independent	Heather Robinson	355	1.2	+1.2
Total formal votes		28,684	96.8	−1.3
Informal votes		939	3.2	+1.3
Turnout		29,623	93.5	
Two-party-preferred result
Labor	Ian Maxfield	15,063	52.5	+4.1
Liberal	Florian Andrighetto	13,621	47.5	−4.1
Labor gain from Liberal		Swing	+4.1	

==== 1996 ====
1996 Victorian state election: Narracan
Party	Candidate	Votes	%	±%
Liberal	Florian Andrighetto	13,903	47.4	−4.9
Labor	Brendan Jenkins	12,271	41.8	+1.6
Independent	Peter Wells	2,135	7.3	+7.3
Natural Law	Lisa Barnes	593	2.0	+2.0
Independent	Luke Van Der Meulen	427	1.5	+1.5
Total formal votes		29,329	98.2	+0.5
Informal votes		548	1.8	−0.5
Turnout		29,877	95.3	
Two-party-preferred result
Liberal	Florian Andrighetto	15,095	51.6	−3.8
Labor	Brendan Jenkins	14,146	48.4	+3.8
Liberal hold		Swing	−3.8	

==== 1992 ====
1992 Victorian state election: Narracan
Party	Candidate	Votes	%	±%
Liberal	John Delzoppo	15,352	52.3	+10.6
Labor	Brendan Jenkins	11,794	40.2	−3.9
Independent	Trisha Taig	1,456	5.0	+5.0
Independent	John Cross	731	2.5	+2.5
Total formal votes		29,333	97.6	+0.1
Informal votes		712	2.4	−0.1
Turnout		30,045	96.4	
Two-party-preferred result
Liberal	John Delzoppo	16,219	55.4	+3.7
Labor	Brendan Jenkins	13,080	44.6	−3.7
Liberal hold		Swing	+3.7	

=== Elections in the 1980s ===
==== 1988 ====
1988 Victorian state election: Narracan
Party	Candidate	Votes	%	±%
Labor	Neil Young	12,281	44.14	−2.18
Liberal	John Delzoppo	11,612	41.73	−1.87
National	Kenneth Ipsen	2,783	10.00	+3.01
Democrats	David White	1,148	4.13	+4.13
Total formal votes		27,824	97.50	−0.47
Informal votes		713	2.50	+0.47
Turnout		28,537	93.85	−0.63
Two-party-preferred result
Liberal	John Delzoppo	14,371	51.67	+1.31
Labor	Neil Young	13,443	48.33	−1.31
Liberal hold		Swing	+1.31	

==== 1985 ====
1985 Victorian state election: Narracan
Party	Candidate	Votes	%	±%
Labor	Robin Matthews	12,619	46.3	+0.4
Liberal	John Delzoppo	11,880	43.6	+5.8
National	Julia Ettery	1,905	7.0	−1.8
Independent	John McNamara	842	3.1	+3.1
Total formal votes		27,246	98.0	
Informal votes		564	2.0	
Turnout		27,810	94.5	
Two-party-preferred result
Liberal	John Delzoppo	13,716	50.4	+1.8
Labor	Robin Matthews	13,522	49.6	−1.8
Liberal notional gain from Labor		Swing	+1.8	

==== 1982 ====
1982 Victorian state election: Narracan
Party	Candidate	Votes	%	±%
Labor	Richard Gubbins	11,909	44.4	+2.0
Liberal	John Delzoppo	10,503	39.2	−4.6
National	Douglas Hatfield	2,427	9.1	+0.1
Democratic Labor	Brian Handley	1,070	4.0	+4.0
Democrats	Nancye Yeates	922	3.4	−1.5
Total formal votes		26,831	97.7	−0.3
Informal votes		640	2.3	+0.3
Turnout		27,471	94.6	+0.2
Two-party-preferred result
Liberal	John Delzoppo	13,886	51.7	−3.4
Labor	Richard Gubbins	12,945	48.3	+3.4
Liberal hold		Swing	−3.4	

=== Elections in the 1970s ===
==== 1979 ====
1979 Victorian state election: Narracan
Party	Candidate	Votes	%	±%
Liberal	Jim Balfour	11,023	43.8	+8.2
Labor	William Rutherford	10,675	42.4	+4.8
National	Douglas Hatfield	2,275	9.0	−13.5
Democrats	Alan Petschack	1,221	4.9	+4.9
Total formal votes		25,194	98.0	−0.6
Informal votes		521	2.0	+0.6
Turnout		25,715	94.4	+0.3
Two-party-preferred result
Liberal	Jim Balfour	13,878	55.1	−5.1
Labor	William Rutherford	11,316	44.9	+5.1
Liberal hold		Swing	−5.1	

==== 1976 ====
1976 Victorian state election: Narracan
Party	Candidate	Votes	%	±%
Labor	Pat Bartholomeusz	8,897	37.6	−4.3
Liberal	Jim Balfour	8,443	35.6	−3.1
National	Arthur Hewson	5,331	22.5	+9.7
Democratic Labor	Brian Handley	1,020	4.3	−2.4
Total formal votes		23,691	98.6	
Informal votes		337	1.4	
Turnout		24,028	94.1	
Two-party-preferred result
Liberal	Jim Balfour	14,265	60.2	+3.8
Labor	Pat Bartholomeusz	9,426	39.8	−3.8
Liberal hold		Swing	+3.8	

==== 1973 ====
1973 Victorian state election: Narracan
Party	Candidate	Votes	%	±%
Liberal	Jim Balfour	9,062	39.8	+3.4
Labor	Wilfred Bartholomeusz	8,992	39.5	+0.7
Country	Alfred Bush	3,163	13.9	+0.1
Democratic Labor	John Mann	1,524	6.7	−4.3
Total formal votes		22,741	98.0	+0.6
Informal votes		472	2.0	−0.6
Turnout		23,213	95.0	−0.4
Two-party-preferred result
Liberal	Jim Balfour	13,320	58.6	+7.8
Labor	Wilfred Bartholomeusz	9,421	41.4	−7.8
Liberal hold		Swing	+7.8	

==== 1970 ====
1970 Victorian state election: Narracan
Party	Candidate	Votes	%	±%
Labor	Wilfred Bartholomeusz	8,125	38.8	+8.3
Liberal	Jim Balfour	7,632	36.4	−3.7
Country	Reinhardt Reuter	3,895	13.8	−4.0
Democratic Labor	Peter Saunders	2,312	11.0	−0.5
Total formal votes		20,964	97.4	−0.2
Informal votes		554	2.6	+0.2
Turnout		21,518	95.4	−0.5
Two-party-preferred result
Liberal	Jim Balfour	10,643	50.8	−15.2
Labor	Wilfred Bartholomeusz	10,321	49.2	+15.2
Liberal hold		Swing	−15.2	

=== Elections in the 1960s ===
==== 1967 ====
1967 Victorian state election: Narracan
Party	Candidate	Votes	%	±%
Liberal	Jim Balfour	8,243	40.1	+5.6
Labor	George Wragg	6,267	30.5	0.0
Country	Daniel Vaughan	3,667	17.9	−4.2
Democratic Labor	Peter Saunders	2,367	11.5	−1.4
Total formal votes		20,544	97.6	
Informal votes		504	2.4	
Turnout		21,048	95.9	
Two-party-preferred result
Liberal	Jim Balfour	13,568	66.0	+0.5
Labor	George Wragg	6,976	34.0	−0.5
Liberal hold		Swing	+0.5	
