= 2023 Narracan state supplementary election =

Supplementary election in Australia

- 28 January 2023

Electoral district of Narracan in the Victorian Legislative Assembly
- Registered: 50,506
- Turnout: 78.9% (▼5.9 pp)

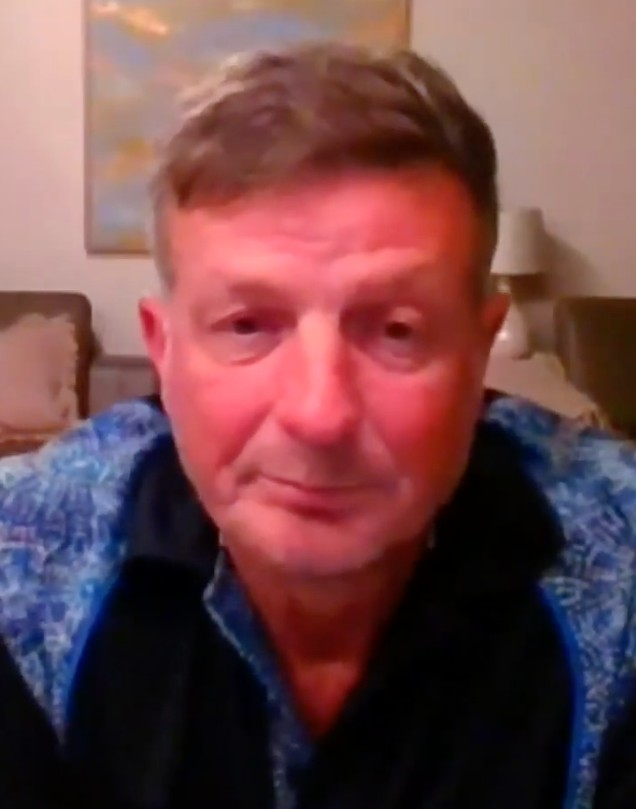

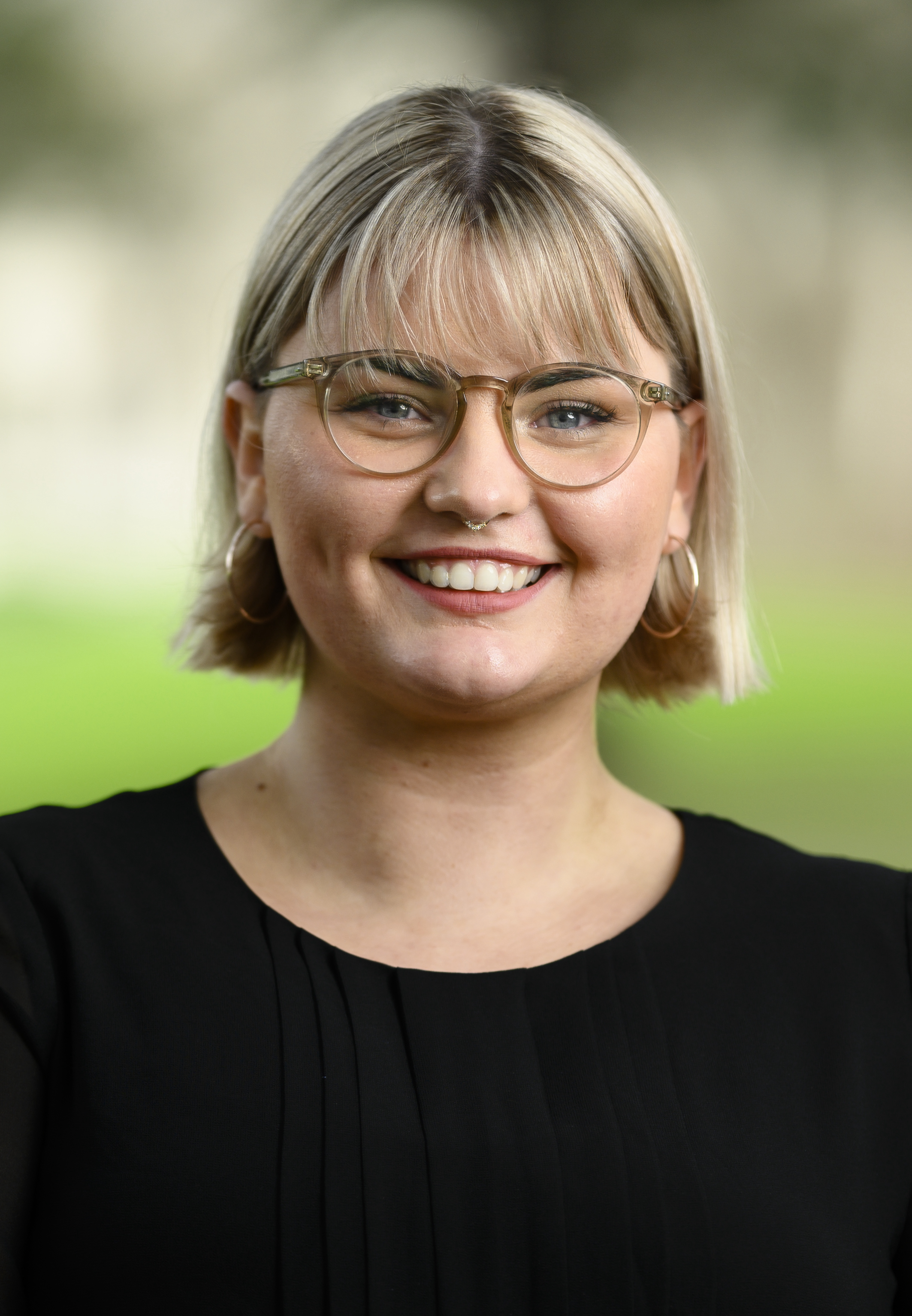
	First party	Second party	Third party
Candidate	Wayne Farnham	Tony Wolfe	Alyssa Weaver
Party	Liberal	Independent	Greens
Primary vote	16,741	4,110	4,132
Percentage	45.0%	11.0%	11.1%
Swing	▼10.6 pp	▲11.0 pp	▲5.1 pp
TCP	63.0%	37.0%
TCP swing	▲3.0 pp	▲37.0 pp
- Location of Narracan (highlighted in green) in Victoria.
MP before election
Gary Blackwood
Liberal
Elected MP
Wayne Farnham
Liberal

A supplementary election was held in the district of Narracan on 28 January 2023, to elect a member for the district to the Victorian Legislative Assembly.

Six days before the 2022 Victorian state election, the Nationals candidate for Narracan was found dead. According to Victorian electoral law, the lower house election in Narracan was declared failed, with a supplementary election triggered. The Labor and National parties chose not to contest, leaving the Liberal candidate Wayne Farnham favoured. The Liberal Party had held the seat of Narracan since 2006, and it was predicted to be a safe seat for the party following an electoral redistribution.

Farnham won the supplementary election. In a field of eleven candidates, Farnham held a large lead on first preferences, enabling him to prevail despite a drop in the Liberal primary vote. Independent candidate Tony Wolfe polled second following the distribution of preferences, receiving 37.0 per cent of the two-candidate-preferred vote. Greens candidate Alyssa Weaver was second on first preferences with 11 per cent, but was overtaken by Wolfe following preference distribution.

== Background ==
The district of Narracan is centred on western Gippsland, stretching from Melbourne's eastern fringes to the Latrobe Valley, and containing the regional towns of Warragul and Drouin. It had been held by Gary Blackwood of the Liberal Party since 2006, but Blackwood announced he would step down in November 2021, in advance of the 2022 Victorian state election. Following the 2018 state election, an electoral redistribution had resulted in the town of Moe, which traditionally supports the Labor Party, being moved from Narracan to the neighbouring district of Morwell. This had the effect of strengthening the Liberal Party's margin in Narracan, to the point where it was the safest Liberal seat in the state, according to Victorian Electoral Commission (VEC) analysis.

On 20 November 2022, Shaun Gilchrist, the Nationals candidate for Narracan, was found dead in Rawson bushland. Gilchrist was due to face a directions hearing for rape and sexual assault charges before the County Court later in the month. Under Victorian electoral law, if a candidate dies before 6pm on election day, the election is considered failed. The VEC announced the following day that the Narracan election had been failed, triggering a supplementary election. As the state election was scheduled for 26 November, early voting had already begun in the Narracan district, and voting for the upper house was still required.

A supplementary election had previously occurred in Victoria after the 1999 state election. Peter McLellan, the MP for Frankston East, died of a heart attack on election day. This triggered the 1999 Frankston East supplementary election, which would be won by the Labor Party, contributing to the downfall of Jeff Kennett's government.

== Key dates ==
The writ of election was issued by Governor Linda Dessau on 19 December 2022. The timeline for the supplementary election was as follows:

- Tuesday 8 November 2022 − Electoral roll closes
- Monday 19 December − Writ issued
- Tuesday 20 December − Candidate nominations open
- Thursday 12 January 2023, 12pm − Candidate nominations close for registered party candidates
- Friday 13 January − Candidate nominations close for independent candidates
- Monday 16 January − Early voting begins
- Saturday 28 January − Election day

== Candidates ==
Below is the list of candidates who initially nominated for the Narracan district at the 2022 state election, listed in ballot paper order:

Party	Candidate
National	Shaun Gilchrist
Greens	Alyssa Weaver
One Nation	Casey Murphy
Labor	Justin Seddon
Liberal	Wayne Farnham
Animal Justice	Laura Rees
Family First	Hannah Darts
Independent	Tony Wolfe
Freedom	Leonie Blackwell

Labor and the Nationals both chose not to contest the supplementary election. The Animal Justice Party and Family First contested, but with different candidates, while Weaver, Murphy, Farnham, Wolfe, and Blackwell all recontested. Labour DLP and the Liberal Democrats both stood in the supplementary election, despite not nominating for the state election, and independents Annemarie McCabe and Ian Honey were also new candidates.

Geoff Robinson, a senior politics lecturer at Deakin University, said that the Liberal Party were in a "secure position" at the supplementary election, stating that any challenge would not come from the left due to Narracan's political leanings. He also believed that the large field of candidates, numbering eleven, would likely favour the Liberal candidate, as non-Liberal support would be fragmented. Madeleine Spencer of ABC News said that the withdrawal of the Nationals and Labor had shifted Narracan from a three-cornered-contest to one where independent Tony Wolfe was likely to be the main challenger to the Liberals' Wayne Farnham.

== Campaign ==
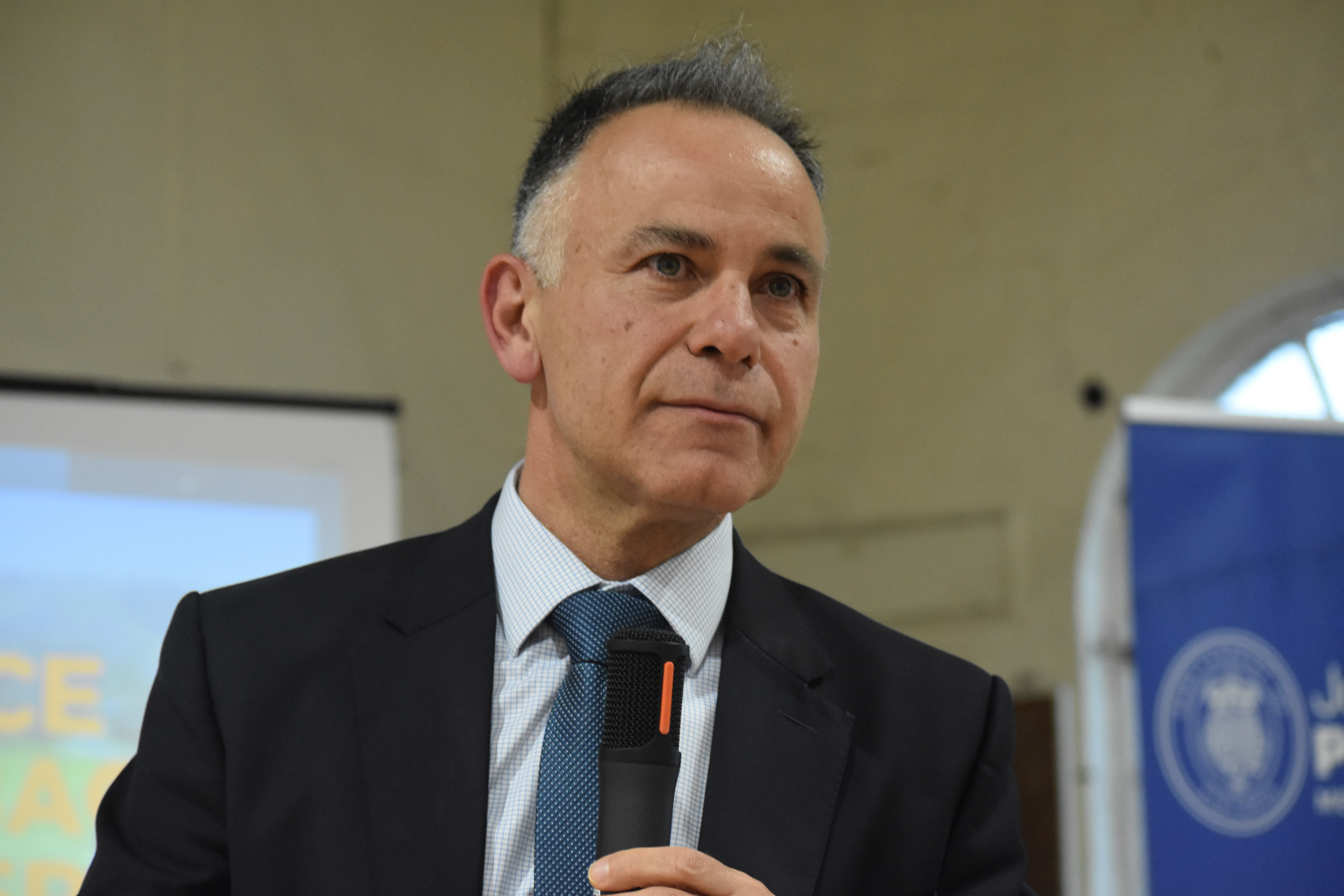
John Pesutto (pictured) was the Liberal leader at the time, and campaigned at the supplementary election.

Farnham, an owner of a local construction business, cited advocacy for a new West Gippsland Hospital as a key priority for him if elected. He stated that his role as part of the Liberal Party, the main opposition party in Victoria, would give him "strength in numbers" and a better ability to hold the government to account. Farnham also mentioned traffic congestion, flooding and drainage, and improving the Walhalla sewage system as issues he wished to address. John Pesutto, the leader of the Liberal Party, made a number of visits to Narracan during the supplementary election campaign.

Wolfe, a former worker in coal-fired energy generation, said that he also wanted to push for the construction of a new West Gippsland Hospital, as well as improved health services more broadly in the Narracan area, citing mental health support as a particular priority. Wolfe said that the Labor government would be more likely to work with him than a Liberal MP. He also supported a transition to renewable energy, domestic violence prevention, and increased provision of services for Narracan given its growing population.

McCabe, mayor of Baw Baw Shire and a councillor of two years, said that Narracan's safeness for the Liberal Party meant it was neglected in proportion to its population, and that increased infrastructure and services could only come by making Narracan a marginal seat.

== Results ==
Farnham easily won the supplementary election. The seat was called by Australian Broadcasting Corporation election analyst Antony Green at 7:25pm on election night. Green stated that although the Liberals looked to have a double-digit swing against them on primary votes, Farnham still received more than double the first preferences of any other candidate, and thus would not be defeated after the distribution of preferences.

Farnham expressed gratitude for his election and said that his message had resonated with voters. Pesutto said that the Narracan result, which gave the Liberal Party 28 out of 88 seats in the Victorian Legislative Assembly, was encouraging progress in the context of the Liberal Party's goal of regaining government at the 2026 state election.

Provisional election night returns showed Farnham defeating Wolfe with 62.56 per cent of the two-candidate preferred vote. Wolfe said that he was "quite happy" by this result, although he had hoped for a more narrow margin to put a greater focus on the Narracan electorate. Wolfe placed in third on election night returns, behind Alyssa Weaver, but Green considered Wolfe likely to overtake Weaver following the distribution of preferences.

The final results for Narracan are as follows:

2023 Narracan state supplementary election
Party	Candidate	Votes	%	±%
Liberal	Wayne Farnham	16,741	45.0	−10.6
Greens	Alyssa Weaver	4,132	11.1	+5.1
Independent	Tony Wolfe	4,110	11.0	+11.0
Democratic Labour	Sophia Camille De Wit	2,641	7.1	+7.1
Freedom	Leonie Blackwell	2,254	6.1	+6.1
One Nation	Casey Murphy	2,246	6.0	+6.0
Independent	Annemarie McCabe	1,437	3.9	+3.9
Liberal Democrats	Michael Abelman	1,325	3.6	+3.6
Family First	Brendan Clarke	1,089	2.9	+2.9
Animal Justice	Austin Cram	849	2.3	+2.3
Independent	Ian Honey	381	1.0	+1.0
Total formal votes		37,205	93.4	–1.4
Informal votes		2,619	6.6	+1.4
Registered electors		50,506		
Turnout		39,824	78.9	−5.9
Two-candidate-preferred result
Liberal	Wayne Farnham	23,448	63.0	+3.0
Independent	Tony Wolfe	13,757	37.0	+37.0
Liberal hold		Swing	+3.0	

The two-candidate-preferred count listed above was part of a full preference distribution conducted by the VEC, conducted only for informative purposes with no bearing on the final result. Farnham achieved a majority before the final preference distribution, with the final distribution of preferences in the Narracan count as follows:

Results after distribution of preferences
Party	Candidate	Votes	%	±%
Liberal	Wayne Farnham	19,230	51.7	
Independent	Tony Wolfe	6,891	18.5	
Greens	Alyssa Weaver	6,073	16.3	
Freedom	Leonie Blackwell	5,011	13.5	
