= 2007 Canadian honours =

Canadian government recognitions

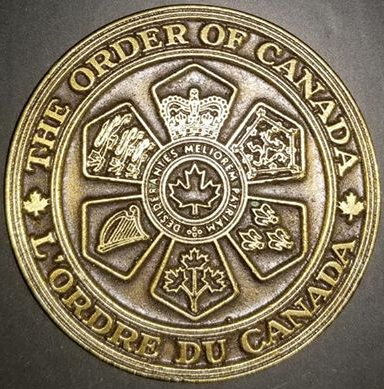
The Seal of the Order of Canada

The following are the appointments to various Canadian Honours of 2007. Usually, they are announced as part of the New Year and Canada Day celebrations and are published within the Canada Gazette during year. This follows the custom set out within the United Kingdom which publishes its appoints of various British Honours for New Year's and for monarch's official birthday. However, instead of the midyear appointments announced on Victoria Day, the official birthday of the Canadian Monarch, this custom has been transferred with the celebration of Canadian Confederation and the creation of the Order of Canada.

However, as the Canada Gazette publishes appointment to various orders, decorations and medal, either Canadian or from Commonwealth and foreign states, this article will reference all Canadians so honoured during the 2007 calendar year.

Provincial Honours are not listed within the Canada Gazette, however they are listed within the various publications of each provincial government. Provincial honours are listed within the page.

== The Order of Canada ==
=== Companions of the Order of Canada ===
Undress ribbon of a Companion of the Order of Canada

- Richard Drouin, C.C., O.Q. (This is a promotion within the Order)
- Joseph Gosnell Sr., C.C., O.B.C. (This is a promotion within the Order)
- Ronald D. Southern, C.C., C.B.E. (This is a promotion within the Order)

=== Officer of the Order of Canada ===
Undress ribbon of an Officer of the Order of Canada

- Ross Campbell, O.C.
- Robert Carsen, O.C.
- Peter Desbarats, O.C.
- Louis Fortier, O.C.
- Paul Gendreau, O.C.
- Nicolas Georganas, O.C., O.Ont.
- James A. Gosling, O.C.
- Antoine M. Hakim, O.C.
- Bryan L. Harvey, O.C., S.O.M.
- M. Daria Haust, O.C.
- Arthur Hiller, O.C.
- Chaviva Milada Hošek, O.C.
- Eric Hoskins, O.C., M.S.C.
- Hector J. Jacques, O.C.
- Cyril Max Kay, O.C. (This is a promotion within the Order)
- Robert Louie, O.C.
- Clifford Garfield Mahood, O.C.
- Jacob H. Masliyah, O.C.
- Jaymie M. Matthews, O.C.
- Arthur B. McDonald, O.C.
- Gerald McMaster, O.C.
- William H. New, O.C.
- Francis A. Plummer, O.C.
- Dorothy M. Pringle, O.C.
- Rémi Quirion, O.C., C.Q.
- Dennis C. Smith, O.C.
- Liliane M. Stewart, O.C., O.Q.
- Ben Weider, O.C., C.Q. (This is a promotion within the Order)
- E. Douglas Wigle, O.C.

=== Members of the Order of Canada ===
Undress ribbon for a Member of the Order of Canada

- Bertha Allen, C.M.
- Reverend Sister Kathrine Bellamy, C.M., O.N.L.
- Henry John Bergen, C.M.
- André Caillé, C.M.
- Jan de Vries, C.M.
- Catherine A. (Kiki) Delaney, C.M.
- Michel Donato, C.M.
- Howard Engel, C.M.
- Paul Fazio, C.M.
- William Garden, C.M.
- The Reverend Michael Gardener, C.M.
- Helen E. Gardiner, C.M.
- Roland Gauvin, C.M.
- Patsy George, C.M., O.B.C.
- Barbara Gowdy, C.M.
- Lois Hollstedt, C.M.
- Erast R. Huculak, C.M.
- Frances Itani, C.M.
- Alex S. Janvier, C.M.
- Connie Kaldor, C.M.
- Pearl Keenan, C.M.
- Craig Kielburger, C.M., M.S.M.
- The Reverend Harry Lehotsky, C.M.
- Mary Majka, C.M., O.N.B.
- Rémi Marcoux, C.M.
- Austin A. Mardon, C.M.
- John T. Mayberry, C.M.
- Eric H. Molson, C.M.
- The Honourable W. Kenneth Moore, C.M.
- Avrum Morrow, C.M.
- Timothy M. Murray, C.M.
- Geraldine Nakonechny, C.M.
- Hanna Newcombe, C.M.
- Carol Newell, C.M.
- Daniel O’Brien, C.M., O.N.B.
- Patrick O’Flaherty, C.M.
- J. Norgrove Penny, C.M.
- Robert L. Pierce, C.M.
- David S. Precious, C.M.
- Valerie Pringle, C.M.
- Hartley T. Richardson, C.M.
- Jean Roberts, C.M.
- Joseph D. Robertson, C.M.
- Oren Robison, C.M.
- Mark H. Rowswell, C.M.
- Jane Vance Rule, C.M., O.B.C.
- Charles S. Scranton, C.M.
- Evelyn Shapiro, C.M.
- Gérard Snow, C.M.
- Joan Stebbins, C.M.
- Robert O. Stephens, C.M.
- A. Jonathan Stoessl, C.M.
- Setsuko Thurlow, C.M.
- Anthony P. Toldo, C.M., O.Ont.
- Lorne Trottier, C.M.
- David A. Young, C.M.
- Melvin N. Zajac, C.M.

== Order of Military Merit ==
=== Commanders of the Order of Military Merit ===
Undress ribbon for a Commander of the Order of Military Merit

- Major-General J. J. C. Bouchard, C.D. (This is a promotion within the Order)
- Major-General Michel Gauthier, M.S.C., C.D.
- Rear-Admiral D. G. McNeil, C.D.
- Major-General W. J. Natynczyk, C.D. (This is a promotion within the Order)
- Major-General H. M. Petras, C.D.
- Rear-Admiral J. J. P. Thiffault, M.S.C., C.D.

=== Officers of the Order of Military Merit ===
Undress ribbon for an Officer of the Order of Military Merit

- Major J. R. Armour, C.D.
- Major J. M. Atherley-Blight, C.D.
- Lieutenant-Colonel J. G. S. Bédard, C.D.
- Commander L. Bisson, C.D.
- Lieutenant-Colonel G. J. Blais, C.D.
- Lieutenant-Commander J. G. G. Bouchard, C.D.
- Commander J. V. Brooks, C.D.
- Colonel M. D. Capstick, C.D.
- Colonel M. P. Cessford, C.D.
- Major J. D. A. Corbeil, C.D.
- Colonel J. C. M. Demers, C.D.
- Major D. C. Duplisea, M.B., C.D.
- Colonel D. A. Fraser, M.S.M., C.D.
- Lieutenant-Colonel N. E. Gibson, C.D.
- Lieutenant-Colonel K. L. Goheen, C.D.
- Captain(N) R. W. Greenwood, C.D.
- Colonel J. M. M. Hainse, C.D.
- Lieutenant-Colonel J. A. J. Hamel, C.D.
- Colonel C. M. Hazleton, C.D.
- Colonel G. Herfst, C.D.
- Lieutenant-Colonel C. D. Hobbs, C.D.
- Colonel H. F. Jaeger, M.S.M., C.D.
- Captain(N) D. J. S. Kyle, C.D.
- Lieutenant-Colonel W. T. LeLievre, C.D.
- Colonel P. R. Matte, C.D.
- Major S. L. McIntosh, C.D.
- Lieutenant-Colonel J. P. L. Meloche, C.D.
- Major J. R. Near, C.D.
- Lieutenant-Colonel S. J. Neville, C.D.
- Colonel W. W. A. Riedel, C.D.
- Commander E. M. Steele, C.D.

=== Members of the Order of Military Merit ===
Undress ribbon for a Member of the Order of Military Merit

- Chief Petty Officer 2nd Class M. W. Amirault, C.D.
- Master Warrant Officer B. W. Bailey, C.D.
- Warrant Officer P. J. P. Beauchamp, C.D.
- Chief Warrant Officer J. A. S. Berthiaume, C.D.
- Master Warrant Officer D. W. Bolster, C.D.
- Chief Warrant Officer L. M. Boyd, C.D.
- Chief Warrant Officer D. R. Bradley, M.S.M., C.D.
- Chief Warrant Officer S. D. Bradley, C.D.
- Sergeant P. A. Briand, C.D.
- Chief Petty Officer 2nd Class R. L. Brown, C.D.
- Lieutenant(N) J. J. Cadwell, C.D.
- Chief Warrant Officer D. P. Campbell, C.D.
- Chief Petty Officer 1st Class J. D. Chapman C.D.
- Chief Warrant Officer G. A. Cook, C.D.
- Captain G. Counsell, C.D.
- Chief Petty Officer 1st Class D. L. Crocker, C.D.
- Captain D. Cubbon, C.D.
- Master Warrant Officer M. R. F. M. Dulude, C.D.
- Captain R. Ebsary, C.D.
- Chief Petty Officer 1st Class P. K. Evans, C.D.
- Chief Warrant Officer W. H. Forde, C.D.
- Master Warrant Officer M. J. S. Forest, M.B., C.D.
- Captain J. P. B. Gagné, C.D.
- Chief Warrant Officer J. M. J. Gagné, C.D.
- Chief Warrant Officer D. L. Gibson, C.D.
- Chief Warrant Officer M. L. M. Gilbert, C.D.
- Chief Warrant Officer W. D. Gosse, C.D.
- Chief Warrant Officer R. Gravel, C.D.
- Captain R. K. Jones, C.D.
- Master Warrant Officer S. R. Kearsley, C.D.
- Petty Officer 1st Class J. G. R. Labrie, C.D.
- Chief Warrant Officer J. A. Y. Laforest, C.D.
- Chief Warrant Officer C. D. Lander, C.D.
- Chief Warrant Officer J. M. P. Lemire, C.D.
- Petty Officer 1st Class J. J.-C. S. Lespérance, C.D.
- Chief Warrant Officer J. F. Locke, C.D.
- Master Warrant Officer S. M. Machado, C.D.
- Chief Warrant Officer D. W. Mahon, C.D.
- Chief Petty Officer 1st Class J. A. McEwen, C.D.
- Master Warrant Officer D. J. Miller, C.D.
- Chief Petty Officer 1st Class J. E. Morris, C.D.
- Chief Warrant Officer B. E. Neal, C.D.
- Captain D. M. Neish, C.D.
- Chief Petty Officer 2nd Class T. S. Neraasen, C.D.
- Chief Warrant Officer R. F. A. Overhoff, C.D.
- Warrant Officer J. D. R. Parisien, C.D.
- Chief Warrant Officer J. M. Poirier, C.D.
- Warrant Officer K. E. Russell, C.D.
- Sergeant J. G. Short, C.D.
- Master Warrant Officer E. T. A. Slade, C.D.
- Captain E. R. C. Smith, C.D.
- Chief Petty Officer 2nd Class R. S. Spinelli, C.D.
- Master Warrant Officer R. R. J. St. Pierre, C.D.
- Chief Warrant Officer L. V. J. Surridge, C.D.
- Chief Petty Officer 1st Class T. A. Thomas, C.D.
- Chief Warrant Officer P. D. Toomey, C.D.
- Chief Warrant Officer J. B. Tremblay, C.D.
- Chief Warrant Officer J. B. N. Trépanier, C.D.
- Chief Warrant Officer S. W. Tucker, C.D.
- Chief Warrant Officer G. J. F. Vandendriessche, C.D.
- Chief Warrant Officer M. Veilleux, C.D.
- Chief Warrant Officer K. R. Vivian, C.D.
- Chief Warrant Officer D. R. Walker, C.D.
- Chief Warrant Officer R. J. Western, C.D.
- Master Warrant Officer A. J. Whitehall, C.D.
- Master Warrant Officer M. A. Wilson, C.D.

== Order of Merit of the Police Forces ==
=== Officers of the Order of Merit of the Police Forces ===
Undress ribbon of an Officer of the Order of Merit of the Police Forces

- Assistant Commissioner Ian Edward Atkins
- Chief Inspector Jacques Beaupré
- Deputy Commissioner John F. Carson
- Assistant Director General Steven Chabot
- Assistant Director General Richard Deschesnes
- Ronald M. Fourney Chief Paul Hamelin
- Deputy Commissioner Jay C. Hope
- Director John M. Janusz
- Chief Armand P. La Barge
- Director Daniel Langlais
- Chief B. W. (Wes) Luloff
- Assistant Commissioner Alistair Donald Macintyre
- Assistant Commissioner Darrell Wesley McFadyen
- Staff Sergeant William Randall Munro
- Deputy Chief Susan P. E. Sue O’Sullivan

=== Members of the Order of Merit of the Police Forces ===
Undress ribbon of a Member of the Order of Merit of the Police Forces

- Staff Sergeant Dominic J. Broaders
- Chief F. Richard Bruce Staff
- Sergeant John A. Buis
- Chief Superintendent Ruby Drucilla Burns
- Constable Gérard Carrier
- Chief Marshall L. Chalmers
- Superintendent Martin J. Cheliak
- Inspector Paul Richard Darbyshire
- Deputy Chief Bartolomeo DiPasquale
- Inspector Karl H. Erfle
- Assistant Commissioner Barbara George
- Sergeant Warren S. Gherasim
- Inspector Douglas A. Handy
- Chief Superintendent John Francis Henderson
- Inspector Daniel B. Jones
- Staff Sergeant James R. Kay
- Staff Sergeant Robert Frederick Kempf
- Chief Superintendent Roderick Robert Knecht
- Captain Réal Lagacé
- Constable Joseph Robert Sylvain L’Heureux
- Constable Carol J. J. Locas
- Chief Terrence M. McLaren
- Chief Superintendent Robert Wilfred Paulson
- Chief Inspector Francis Pelletier
- Deputy Chief Rod A. Piukkala
- Corporal Michael John Quinn
- Chief Inspector Mario Rancourt
- Inspector John C. Ratcliff
- Constable Walter J. Silver

== Most Venerable Order of the Hospital of St. John of Jerusalem ==
Undress ribbon for all grades of the Most Venerable Order of the Hospital of St. John of Jerusalem

=== Knights and Dames of the Order of St. John ===
- The Honourable Gordon L. Barnhart, S.O.M.
- Her Honour the Honourable Barbara A. Hagerman, O.P.E.I.
- Thomas Edward Allan (This is a promotion within the Order)
- Brock D. Cairns (This is a promotion within the Order)
- Roger Alexander Lindsay, A.D.C. (This is a promotion within the Order)
- John C. Mah, C.D. (This is a promotion within the Order)
- Lieutenant Richard Proulx (This is a promotion within the Order)
- Major Leonel Jean Regimbal, C.D. (This is a promotion within the Order)

=== Commanders of the Order of St. John ===
- The Honourable Geraldine Van Bibber
- Her Honour the Honourable Mayann E. Francis, O.N.S.
- The Honourable Noël A. Kinsella
- The Right Honourable Beverley McLachlin, P.C.
- Thomas Creighton Bird (This is a promotion within the Order)
- Commissioner Gwenneth M. Boniface, C.O.M. (This is a promotion within the Order)
- Garry James Chandler, C.D. (This is a promotion within the Order)
- Lieutenant-Colonel (Ret’d) Arthur Richard William Jordan, C.D. (This is a promotion within the Order)
- Renald Parent (This is a promotion within the Order)
- Phillippe-Denis Richard (This is a promotion within the Order)
- Jacqueline Chun Kwun Yue (This is a promotion within the Order)

=== Officers of the Order of St. John ===
- Naomi Barnhart
- Nelson Hagerman
- Brigadier-General, The Reverend Stanley Johnstone, C.D.

==== Promotions to Officers within the Order of St. John ====
- Captain Harry E. Austen, M.M.M., C.D.,
- Roger Nikolai Autio
- Bonnie L. Badyk
- Karine Bibeau Lesage
- Dominic Blouin
- Manuela J. Boehm
- Douglas Jermey Bottoms, C.M.
- Constable/Agent Adam J. D. Carter
- Karren E. Cruikshanks
- Marc-Antoine Deschamps
- Michael Dosdall
- Sergeant William Marshall Eubank
- Major Jean Robert Gagnon, C.D.
- Lieutenant Éric Girard
- Christine-Anne Goodyer
- Cara Michelle Greene Hilborn
- Owen E. Gene Hachey
- Thomas P. Haney, C.D.
- Edwin Holder
- Lieutenant-Colonel (Ret’d) Susan Margaret Kathler, C.D.
- Harold Leonard Lowe
- Marie-Cécile-Thérèse B. Marin
- Carmie McCormack
- Colonel John R. McDougall
- Robert O’Brien
- Alberta Lillian Roberts
- Petty Officer 2nd Class Edward Charles Roberts
- Bernice Joanne Shackleton
- Stanley Sumbler
- Colonel Joseph Paul de B. Taillon, C.D.
- Colonel (Ret’d) Douglas Bagshaw Walton, O.M.M., C.D.

=== Serving Members of the Order of St. John ===
- Jacob Ryan Ackerman
- Margaret J. Anderson
- Assistant Commissioner Ian E. Atkins, O.O.M.
- Judith Anne Barker
- Robert Donald Bayes
- Michelle Rosalee Bedard
- Jason Billard
- Judith Anne Birney
- Brigitte Bolduc
- Joyann Nicole Book
- Special Constable Kevin Douglas Brandvold
- Shannon Bursey
- Inspector James W. Carroll
- Timmy Chan
- Annik Chouinard
- Jean K. Chute
- Corporal Anthony Edward Clarke
- David Gregory Clarke
- Donald Clavette
- Master-Corporal Christian Cormier
- Lisa M. Costiff
- Nelson Archibald Craig
- Brent William Ernest Crawford
- Maureen Crowley
- Barbara A. Dansart
- Captain Hubert William Dawe
- Ghislain Desmarais
- S. Nicole Doherty
- Sergeant Robert James Dumelie
- Helen Margaret Dyson
- Wayne L. Eva
- Harvey Fields
- Pierre Fluet
- Warrant Officer Robert Joseph Lucien Gareau, C.D.
- Agathe Gauthier,
- Captain Carl Gauthier, C.D.
- Valerie Daylene Gendron
- Carolyn Ann Gervais
- Chief Constable Jamie H. Graham
- Raewyn Heather Harrison
- Marilyn Howlett
- Kirk Patrick Hughes
- Robin Ann Innes-Moroz
- Bernice Jaillet
- Lawrence Michael Joe
- Lucy Johnston
- William Kwok-Keung Ko
- Véronique Lachapelle
- André Lepage
- Lieutenant-Colonel André M. Levesque
- Bryan Lewcock
- Wai Kia Li
- Tracey Heather-Lynn Lowe
- Jean-François Mahé
- Master-Corporal Yves Joseph André Martel, C.D.
- Captain/Capitaine Gordon Bryan Mathers
- Marilyn Matthews-Gibson
- Theresa M. McCormick
- Christopher McCreery
- Sandra McDougall Wilson
- Bonnie Jean McIntosh
- Nathalie Michaud
- Corporal Kelly Dawn Moore
- Karen J. Mross
- Karen Marie Mueller
- Éric Muller
- Caitlin Murphy
- Marcel Noël
- Anna Fay Oatway
- Mary Ann Oderkirk
- Kenneth Hart Oppold
- Carol Elizabeth Parsons
- Warrant Officer Edward Joseph Patten
- Owen Peter Patterson
- Ashley Caitlin Pyne
- Warrant Officer Robert Anthony Quinte, C.D.
- Valerie Dianne Reith
- Ronald Richard
- Vice-Admiral Drew W. Robertson, O.M.M., M.S.M., C.D.
- Audrey Judy Robinson
- Kenneth Gerald Roche
- Sergeant David C. Rogers
- Ronald A. Shewchuk
- Angela L. So, Vancouver
- Aaron George Joseph Sousa
- Trudi M. Tarbett
- Michael D. Thomas
- Anthony Chak-Han Tung
- Linda Gwendoline Van Der Kamp
- Paul Lloyd Vienneau
- Patrick James Ward
- Robert T. Wood
- Iku Yu-Jui Yeh
- Justin K. K. Yeung
- Sally Elizabeth Young

== Military Valour Decorations ==
=== Star of Military Valour ===
Undress ribbon for the Star of Military Valour

- MAJOR WILLIAM HILTON FLETCHER, S.M.V., C.D.
- SERGEANT PATRICK TOWER, S.M.V., C.D.
- PRIVATE JESS RANDALL LAROCHELLE, S.M.V.
- CORPORAL SEAN TEAL, S.M.V.

=== Medal of Military Valour ===
Undress ribbon for the Medal of Military Valour

- SERGEANT MICHAEL THOMAS VICTOR DENINE, M.M.V., C.D.
- MASTER-CORPORAL COLLIN RYAN FITZGERALD, M.M.V.
- PRIVATE JASON CARL ALLAN LAMONT, M.M.V.
- CORPORAL JOHN DAVID MAKELA, M.M.V.
- CAPTAIN DEREK PROHAR, M.M.V.
- MAJOR MICHAEL CHARLES WRIGHT, M.M.V., C.D.
- CORPORAL CHAD GERALD CHEVREFILS, M.M.V.
- CORPORAL JASON FUNNELL, M.M.V.
- MASTER CORPORAL SEAN HUBERT NIEFER, M.M.V.
- PRIVATE MICHAEL PATRICK O’ROURKE, M.M.V.
- CORPORAL CLINTON JOHN ORR, M.M.V.
- CAPTAIN MICHAEL JOHN REEKIE, M.M.V.
- CORPORAL JOSEPH JASON LEE RUFFOLO, M.M.V.

== Canadian Bravery Decorations ==
=== Star of Courage ===
Undress ribbon for the Star of Courage

- Mark Jordan

=== Medal of Bravery ===
Undress ribbon for the Medal of Bravery

- Constable Andrew Bakker
- Sharon Jean Bard
- Wayne Terrence Bhnisch
- Kayla Denomme
- Kiana Denomme
- André Gagné
- Éric Girard
- Osman Hersi
- Constable Philip L. Hordijk
- Constable John Legault
- John “Jack” Eli Marsh Sr.
- John “Johnny” Morris Marsh Jr.
- Hans McKee Sarah McLean
- Bob Miller
- Prakash Mulchand (Posthumous)
- Charles François Pelletier, C.D.
- Constable Gerald Proctor
- Jamie Duncan Wicks Robertson
- Joseph Allan Sinclair
- Constable Scott Sladek
- Sergeant W. Dean Streefkerk
- Danielle Elyse Walker
- Private Jonathan David Olivier Beaudin
- Rachel Davis (posthumous)
- Matthew Dekoning
- Rocky Hanson
- Jessica Lauren Holman-Price (posthumous)
- Robin William Johnstone
- Thomas Murray Martin
- Daniel Harold Peacock
- Claude Plante
- James Daniel Reilly
- Bradley Patrick Roy Smith
- Acting Sergeant Leon Tadeusz Sowa
- Gerald Alfred Strickland
- Detective/Constable Paul Gordon Stuart
- J. Robert Walsh

== Meritorious Service Decorations ==
=== Meritorious Service Cross (Military Division) ===
Undress ribbon for Meritious Service Cross in the military division

- COLONEL STEPHEN JOSEPH BOWES, M.S.C., C.D.
- LIEUTENANT-GENERAL KARL W. EIKENBERRY, M.S.C.
- COLONEL DAVID ALLISON FRASER, O.M.M., M.S.C., M.S.M., C.D.
- LIEUTENANT-COLONEL IAN HOPE, M.S.C., C.D.
- GENERAL JAMES L. JONES, M.S.C., (United States Marine Corps)
- CHIEF WARRANT OFFICER MICHAEL LAWRENCE MCDONALD, M.S.C., C.D.
- COLONEL STEVEN PATRICK NOONAN, M.S.C., C.D.
- CHIEF WARRANT OFFICER RANDY ALLAN NORTHRUP, M.S.C., C.D.
- GENERAL PETER J. SCHOOMAKER, M.S.C., (United States Army)
- ADMIRAL TIMOTHY JOHN KEATING, M.S.C. (United States Navy)
- BRIGADIER-GENERAL GARY JAMES PATRICK O’BRIEN, M.S.C., C.D.

=== Meritorious Service Medal (Military Division) ===
- LIEUTENANT-COLONEL DAVID JAMES ANDERSON, M.S.M., C.D.
- MAJOR TIMOTHY JAMES BISHOP, M.S.M., C.D.
- CHIEF WARRANT OFFICER WARD DESMOND BROWN, M.M.M., M.S.M., C.D.
- COLONEL MICHAEL DEREK CAPSTICK, O.M.M., M.S.M., C.D.f
- MAJOR KIRK ALLISTER GALLINGER, M.S.M., C.D.
- MASTER-CORPORAL STEVEN GREGORY GARTSIDE, M.S.M.
- CAPTAIN NICHOLA KATHLEEN SARAH GODDARD, M.S.M. (Posthumous)
- MAJOR NICHOLAS JAMES ELLIOTT GRIMSHAW, M.S.M., C.D.
- CORPORAL CHRISTOPHER EUGENE KOPP, M.S.M., C.D.
- CHIEF WARRANT OFFICER JOSEPH OSWALD MAURICE PAUL LEBLANC, M.M.M., M.S.M., C.D.
- CORPORAL SHAUN LINDSEY, M.S.M.
- MAJOR JAMES DUNCAN MCKILLIP, M.S.M., C.D.
- COLONEL KEVIN CHARLES OWENS, M.S.M. (United States Marine Corps)
- PETTY OFFICER 2ND CLASS CARLA MAY PENNEY, M.S.M., C.D.
- LIEUTENANT-COLONEL GEORGE JAMES PETROLEKAS, M.S.M., C.D.
- LIEUTENANT-COLONEL THOMAS ERNEST PUTT, M.S.M., C.D.
- LIEUTENANT-COLONEL SHANE BRUCE SCHREIBER, M.S.M., C.D.
- SERGEANT CHADWICK JACK SHAW, M.S.M., C.D.
- MAJOR MASON JAMES STALKER, M.S.M., C.D.
- MASTER WARRANT OFFICER SHAWN DOUGLAS STEVENS, M.S.M., C.D.
- COLONEL CHRISTOPHER VERNON, M.S.M. (British Army)
- COLONEL RICHARD STEPHEN WILLIAMS, M.S.M., (United States Army)
- MAJOR GLEN TALIS ZILKALNS, M.S.M., C.D.
- MAJOR CARY ARTHUR BAKER, M.S.M., C.D.
- MASTER WARRANT OFFICER DARCY SHAWN ELDER, M.S.M., C.D.
- HONORARY COLONEL BERNARDUS ANTONIUS (BEN) VAN RUITEN, M.S.M., C.D.

== Mention in Dispatches ==
- Master-Corporal Niall B. Anthony
- Sergeant Jaime Richard Bradley
- Private Ryan Andrew Carter
- Lieutenant-Commander Peter John Clifford
- Corporal Clark Alexander Cummings
- Private Kevin Yves Royal Dallaire (Posthumous)
- Master-Corporal Jason John Cuppage
- Master-Corporal Jeffrey Allan Fehr
- Master-Corporal Jason Neil Froude
- Corporal Jason Joe Sergeant Scott Machan, C.D.
- Warrant Officer Justin Christopher Mackay
- Corporal Michael Cameron MacDonald
- Master-Corporal Tony Wade Perry
- Master-Corporal Daryl Edward Presley
- Master-Corporal Keith Howard Prodonick
- Corporal Paul Daniel Rachynski
- Private Joseph Jonathan Rustenburg
- Corporal Kyle Austin Scott
- Sergeant Prescott Shipway
- Sergeant Christopher Marc Schmidt, C.D.
- Sergeant Christopher Todd Thombs, C.D.
- Lieutenant Douglas Michael Thorlakson
- Sergeant Chester William Tingley, C.D.
- Corporal Gord Matthew Hazeltyne Whitton
- Sergeant Brian Vincent Adams, C.D.
- Corporal William Jonathan Elliott
- Corporal Nigel Jason Gregg
- Master Corporal Richard James Alan Harris, C.D.
- Sergeant Dan James Holley
- Master Corporal Dwayne Robert Alvin Orvis
- Private Timmy Dean Wilkins

== Commonwealth and Foreign Orders, Decorations and Medal awarded to Canadians ==
=== From Her Majesty The Queen in Right of the United Kingdom ===
==== Iraq Medal with clasp ====
- Captain J. Y. P. S. Bélanger
- Lieutenant-Colonel M. W. Bullock
- Captain A. B. Little
- Major D. W. Rowe

==== Iraq Medal ====
- Lieutenant-Colonel C. Branchaud
- Major K. W. Daley
- Major J. M. McDonald
- Captain B. N. Mialkowsky
- Major J. J. L. P. Legault
- Lieutenant-Colonel B. J. Nash

=== From His Majesty the King of the Belgians ===
==== Officer of the Order of Leopold ====
- Mr. Arie Christian Tupker

=== From the President of France ===
==== Knight of the Order of the Legion of Honour ====
- Reverend Brother Joseph Bruno Légaré
- Mr. Chester S. Bryk
- Mr. Abel Joseph Allain
- Mr. Edouard Alfred Amy
- Mr. Georges Banning
- Mr. Frederick G. Barnard
- Mr. Theodore John Bennett
- Mr. Arthur H. Boon
- Mr. Edward Borland
- Mr. Leonard Brierley
- Ms. Sonia Butt
- Mr. Lloyd F. Berryman
- Mr. Ed Carter-Edwards
- Mr. Albert E. Cook
- Mr. Fenton Edgar Daley
- Mr. Barnett J. Danson
- Mr. Murray S. Dickson
- Mr. James Gordon Donald
- Mr. Harry Dowsett
- Mr. Louis-Philippe Robert Doyon
- Mr. Herménégilde Joseph Edward Dussault
- Mr. Harold Elliott
- Mr. Joseph Fedorak
- Mr. Germain Fleury
- Mr. Jean-Charles Bertrand Forbes
- Mr. John Ramsay Douglas Forbes
- Mr. Frank Paul Forness
- Mr. Lloyd Forrest
- Mr. Joseph C. Gautreau
- Mr. Alexander William Glowa
- Mr. Dennis Charles Goodwin
- Mr. Gustave M. Goulet
- Mr. Mathew Gress
- Mr. William Henry Hale
- Mr. Kenneth Hickey
- Mr. Michael Humenik
- Mr. Wilfred T. Jones
- Mr. W. Brian Lynch
- Mr. Fred D. Marriott
- Mr. Edward G. McAndrew
- Mr. James Herbert McCullough
- Mr. Jack Clifford McFarland
- Mr. Leonard William McKiel
- Mr. William John Harvey Mills
- Mr. Frederick Forrest Moar
- Mr. Fernand Mousseau
- Mr. Fred J. Nicholls
- Mr. Robert L. Pettigrew
- Mr. Réginald John Pickford
- Mr. Harold Prout
- Mr. John Henry Quarton
- Mr. Percy Rescorl
- Mr. Emlyn Roberts
- Mr. Donald Edwin Stewart
- Mr. Douglas Warren
- Mr. Dionne Wilson

==== Knight of the Order of Merit ====
- Mr. Victor Tousignant

==== Knight of the Order of Agricultural Merit ====
- Sylvain Doth

==== Knight of the Order of the Academic Palms ====
- Mr. Luc Langlois
- Ms. Paulette Prevot-Collet
- Mr. Léo Robert

==== National Defence Medal ====
- Major Sean T. Boyle

=== From the President of Hungary ===
==== Commander’s Cross of the Order of Merit ====
- Mr. Nándor F. Dreisziger
- Mr. Dezsö Kádár

==== Officer’s Cross of the Order of Merit ====
- Dr. Frank Felkai
- Ms. Valéria Gyenge
- Mr. István Pál Herédi
- Mr. György Ervin Kulcsár
- Mr. Ferenc Terényi
- Dr. Leslie Iván
- Mr. Janos Lajos Ferenc Molnár
- Mr. John Yaremko

==== Knight’s Cross of the Order of Merit ====
- István Bendó
- Mr. Lajos Czink
- Mr. Arpád Lassú
- Mr. József Polgár
- Mr. Ferenc Fülöp
- Mr. Frank Hasenfratz
- Dr. Farkas Homonnay

=== From the President of Italy ===
==== Commander of the Order of the Star of Solidarity ====
- Professor Luigi Casella
- Mr. Giovanni Fortino
- Mr. Dwight Bennett

==== Knight of the Order of the Star of Solidarity ====
- Mr. Carlo Amodio
- Mr. Antonino Avola
- Mr. Joe Finamore
- Ms. Bianca Paradiso
- Ms. Luciana Rancitelli De Santis
- Mr. Alberto Romano
- Mr. Domenico Rossi
- Ms. Anna Maria Toppazzini
- Mr. Virgilio Soldera
- Mr. Arnaldo Zanon

=== From His Majesty The Emperor of Japan ===
==== Grand Cordon of the Order of the Rising Sun ====
- Dr. Henry A. McKinnell

==== Order of the Rising Sun, Gold and Silver Rays ====
- Sid Kiyoshi Ikeda

=== From the President of Latvia ===
==== Order of the Three Stars ====
- Mr. Andris Palejs
- Mr. Martins Sausins

=== From the President of Mexico ===
==== Order of the Aztec Eagle ====
- Mr. Yves Ducharme
- Mr. Jean-Pierre

=== From Her Majesty The Queen of the Kingdom of the Netherlands ===
==== Officer of the Order of Orange-Nassau ====
- Mr. Ronald Donald Southern

=== From the President of the United States of America ===
==== Legion of Merit ====
===== Degree Legionnaire =====
- Colonel David A. Fraser

==== Meritorious Service Medal ====
- Colonel Peter J. Atkinson
- Major Timothy J. Billings
- Lieutenant-Colonel Charles D. Claggett
- Captain Michel Pierre Joseph Roy
- Captain Christopher Burbidge
- Lieutenant-Commander Edmund M. Garrett

==== Air Medal ====
- Master Corporal Weldon A. Rideout
- Master Corporal Jason K. McNeil

===== Air Medal (First Oak Leaf Cluster) =====
- Master Corporal Weldon A. Rideout
- Master Corporal Jason K. McNeil

===== Air Medal (Second Oak Leaf Cluster) =====
- Master Corporal Jason K. McNeil
