= Drouin =

Drouin is a surname. Notable people with the surname include:

- André Drouin (c. 1947–2017), Canadian politician
- Claude Drouin (born 1956), Canadian politician
- Derek Drouin (born 1990), Canadian high jumper
- Francis Drouin (born 1983), Canadian Liberal politician, Member of the Canadian House of Commons (from 2015)
- Henri Drouin (1911–1992), Canadian lawyer, Politician, and judge
- Jacques Drouin (1943–2021), Canadian animator
- Jonathan Drouin (born 1995), Canadian ice Hockey player
- Jude Drouin (born 1948), Canadian ice hockey player
- Macy Drouin (born 2005), voice of Abby Hatcher
- Marie-Josée Drouin (born 1949), Canadian economist
- Mark Robert Drouin (1903–1963), Canadian politician
- Michelle Drouin (born 1974), American psychologist
- Noël Drouin (1912–2001), Progressive Conservative party member of the Canadian House of Commons
- Olivier-Napoléon Drouin (1867–1943), Canadian politician, mayor of Quebec City from 1910 to 1916
- Oscar Drouin (1890–1953), Canadian politician
- P. C. Drouin (born 1974), Canadian ice hockey player for the Fort Wayne Komets
- Paweensuda Drouin (born 1993), Thai television host, DJ, and beauty pageant titleholder
- Polly Drouin (1908–1968), Canadian ice hockey player
- René Drouin, president and chief executive of the New Hampshire Higher Education Assistance Foundation Network
- Richard Drouin (born 1932), Canadian lawyer and businessman
- Stéphen Drouin (born 1984), French footballer
- Vincent Drouin (1932–1979), Liberal party member of the Canadian House of Commons
- Jeff Deslauriers (Jeff Drouin-Deslauriers; born 1984), Canadian ice hockey goaltender

== See also ==
- Drouin, Victoria, Australia
  - Drouin railway station
