= Andrighetto =

Andrighetto is a surname. Notable people with the name include:

- Florian Andrighetto (born 1953), Australian politician
- Sven Andrighetto (born 1993), Swiss ice hockey winger
