= Phantom sense =

Sensory phenomenon when using VR

Phantom sense is a sensory phenomenon of apparent sensations like touch reported by users of virtual reality (VR) platforms. It refers to physical sensations—such as touch, temperature, or pain—perceived without actual physical stimuli, often when interacting with virtual objects or avatars.

== Overview ==
Phantom sense typically occurs during VR experiences using head-mounted displays (HMDs). Though most VR systems only deliver visual and auditory stimuli, users often report sensations including touch, temperature, and motion despite absent physical stimuli. The term is widely used in online VR communities, especially in VRChat, and has recently gained attention in scientific research.

Academic terms associated with the phenomenon include Phantom Tactile Sensation (PTS), Phantom Touch Illusion (PTI), and Virtual Touch. Some researchers have connected the experience to multisensory integration, synesthesia, and tactile prediction effects.

== Mechanisms ==
=== Cross-modal perception ===
Cross-modal sensory integration is believed to be a key mechanism. For example, users report feeling weak tingling in their body parts that are either touched by other VR users or that they touch themselves. This tingling sensation was hypothesised to reflect predictive cancellation neural signals meant to intercept, but not encountering, incoming tactile signalling from the skin.

== See also ==
- Phantom vibration syndrome
