= Miller v. Skumanick =

2010 US court case

- Court: United States Court of Appeals for the Third Circuit
- Full case name: Mary Jo Miller, Individually and on behalf of her minor daughter, MM; Jami Day, Individually and on behalf of her minor daughter GK; Jane Doe, Individually and on behalf of her minor daughter, ND v. Jeff Mitchell, District Attorney of Wyoming County, Pennsylvania
- Argued: January 15, 2010
- Decided: March 15, 2010

Court membership
- Judges sitting: Thomas L. Ambro, Michael Chagares, and Walter King Stapleton

Miller v. Skumanick was a 2010 Third Circuit Court of Appeals case regarding the practice of sexting and its legal relationship to child pornography.

== Background ==
In October 2008, the principal of a Tunkhannock Area School District school confiscated several students' cellphones and found photographs of partially clothed female students, but with no sexual acts. The school board gave those photos as to Wyoming County District Attorney George Skumanick, Jr. Skumanick threatened to file charges against those posing in the photographs for production of child pornography, which under Pennsylvania law mandated a seven-year sentence and registration as a sex offender. He would not file charges if the girls agreed to probation, completed a six to nine month educational program which would require participants to submit an essay explaining why their actions were wrong.

Of the more than twenty families involved almost all agreed to the deal, but the parents of three female students objected and filed for a temporary restraining order in district court to prevent the prosecution from taking place while they seek an injunction. The restraining order was granted, and Skumanick appealed. The three girls involved were between 12 and 13. The photos were one with two of the girls lying on the floor in their training bras, the other was of one of the girls wearing a towel after a shower below her breasts. The girls reported they did not distribute the photos, but rather they were shared without their consent.

The ACLU intervened on behalf of the girls. District Attorney Skumanick decided to drop the threat of charges against the two girls photographed in their underwear, but continued to argue that the girl who had photographed herself in only a towel was guilty of creating child pornography.

== Decision ==
The plaintiffs argued that prosecution would amount to retaliation against their children's First Amendment right to free expression and against compelled speech, and the parents' Fourteenth Amendment substantive due process right to direct the upbringing of their children. The appellate court upheld the temporary restraining order based on the second and third claims. Specifically, the court affirmed that the students' First Amendment right against compelled speech would be violated by the program's requirement that the student involved explain why their actions were wrong, and the parents' Fourteenth Amendment rights would be violated by the program's moral nature.

The appellate court opinion in this matter did not address whether the pictures in question were pornographic in nature, as it instead ruled that there was no evidence that the plaintiffs ever possessed or distributed the photos.

== Aftermath ==
District Attorney Skumanick was voted out of office the next year.

== See also ==
- Sexting

== Notes ==
- Bazelon, Emily (March 18, 2010). "A federal court rebukes a district attorney who cracked down on three girls over seminude photos". Slate Magazine.
