= Vibrating alert =

Feature of communication devices that notify users by vibration

Video: Vibrating alert on an iPhone 4

A vibrating alert is a feature of communications devices to notify the user of an incoming connection or message. It is particularly common on mobile phones and pagers and usually supplements the ring tone. Most 21st-century mobile phones include a vibrating alert feature, as do smartwatches.

Vibrating alerts are primarily used when a user cannot hear the ringtone (a noisy environment or through hearing loss) or wants a more discreet notification (such as in a theatre). However, when a device is placed on a hard surface, the noise caused by a vibrating alert can often be as loud or louder than a ringtone.

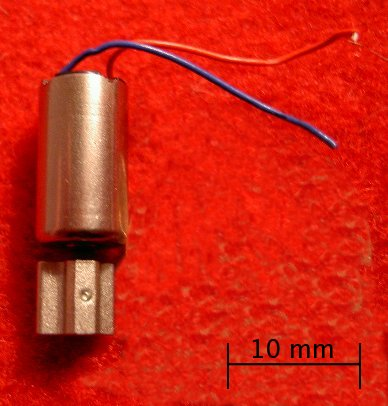
Vibrating alert motor

The vibrations are produced by an electronic component called a vibration motor (alternatively called a haptic actuator). This component typically consists of a small electric motor with an off-center weight fixed to its output shaft.

== See also ==
- Phantom vibration syndrome
- Smartwatch
- Vibrator (mechanical)
