= Sexting =

Sending sexually explicit text messages

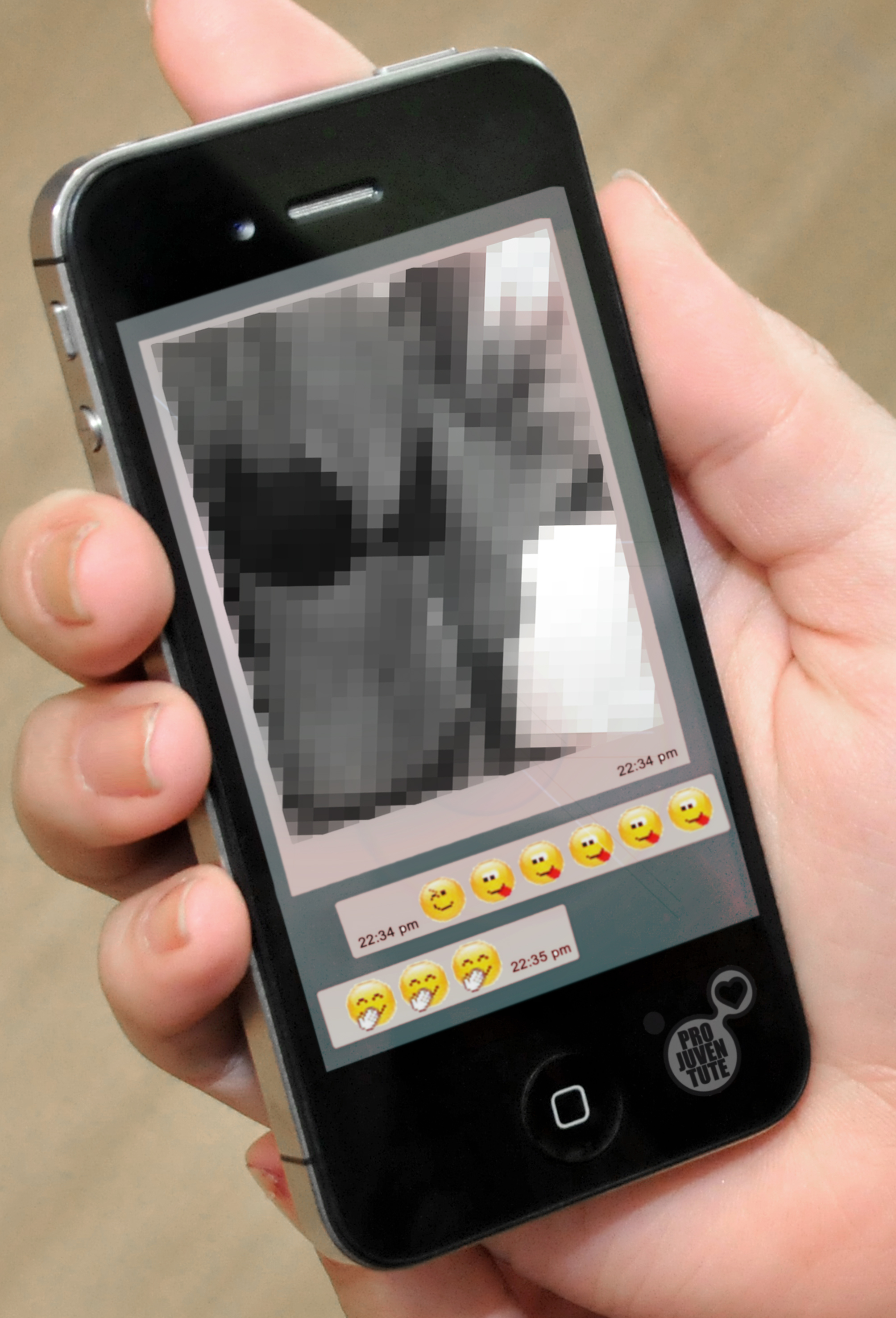
Sexting may involve sharing sexually explicit images over mobile phones.

Sexting is sending, receiving, or forwarding sexually explicit messages, photographs, or videos, primarily between mobile phones. It may also include the use of a computer or any digital device. The term was first popularized early in the 21st century and is a portmanteau of sex and texting, where the latter is meant in the wide sense of sending a text possibly with images. Sexting is not an isolated phenomenon but one of many different types of sexual interaction in digital contexts that is related to sexual arousal.

== Background ==
The first published use of the term sexting was in a 2005 article in the Australian Sunday Telegraph Magazine. In August 2012, the word sexting was listed for the first time in Merriam-Webster's Collegiate Dictionary.

Scientific studies on sexting use different definitions of sexting. While some studies offer comprehensive definitions of sexting, including sending, receiving, and/or forwarding a sexually explicit message or nude image, others have more limited definitions. There are studies that distinguish between sending messages and images, and others that focus only on images sent. Additionally, some studies do not define what they mean with sexting.

Sexting has become more common with the rise in camera phones and smartphones with Internet access, that can be used to send explicit photographs as well as messages. While sexting is done by people of all ages, most media coverage fixates on negative aspects of adolescent usage. Young adults use the medium of the text message much more than any other new media to transmit messages of a sexual nature, and teenagers who have unlimited text messaging plans are more likely to receive sexually explicit texts.

As a result of sexting being a relatively recent practice, ethics are still being established by both those who engage in it and those who create legislation based on this concept. Whether sexting is seen as a positive or negative experience typically rests on the basis of whether or not consent was given to share the images. Nevertheless, Australian laws currently view under-18s as being unable to give consent to sexting, even if they meet the legal age for sexual consent.

== Studies ==
A 2009 study found that 4 percent of teenagers aged 14 to 17 claimed to have sent sexually explicit photos of themselves. Fifteen percent of these teens also claimed to have received sexually explicit photos. This suggests a consent issue of people receiving photos without asking for them. This is enhanced with Snapchat, as the person receiving snapchats will not be aware of the contents until they open it, and messages are automatically deleted after some time. Although sexting through Snapchat is popular, "joke sexting" is more prevalent among users. Sending sexual images as a joke makes up approximately a quarter of the participants.

Some studies of adolescents find that sexting is correlated with risky sex behaviors, while other studies have found no link.

In a 2008 survey of 1,280 teenagers and young adults of both sexes sponsored by The National Campaign to Prevent Teen and Unplanned Pregnancy, 20% of teens (13–20) and 33% of young adults (20–26) had sent nude or semi-nude photographs of themselves electronically. Additionally, 39% of teens and 59% of young adults had sent sexually explicit text messages.

Sexting became popular among teens around 2009, especially among high school students in the United States, where 20 percent of high school students said they had engaged in sexting or receiving sexts.

A widely cited 2011 study indicated the previously reported prevalence was exaggerated. Researchers at the University of New Hampshire (UNH) surveyed 1,560 children between the ages of 10 and 17 and caregivers, reporting that only 2.5 percent of respondents had sent, received or created sexual pictures distributed via cell phone in the previous year. The researchers found that the figure rose to 9.6% when the definition was broadened from images prosecutable as child pornography to any suggestive image, not necessarily nude ones. A 2012 study conducted by the University of Utah questioned the findings reported by the University of New Hampshire researchers. In the University of Utah's study, researchers Strassberg, McKinnon, et al. surveyed 606 teenagers ages 14 to 18 and found that nearly 20 percent of the students said they had sent a sexually explicit image of themselves via cell phone, and nearly twice as many said that they had received a sexually explicit picture. Strassberg, McKinnon, et al. said the UNH study was technically accurate, but that the inclusion of younger children in the sample misrepresented the prevalence of the practice among mid- and older teenagers. Similarly, the 2020 meta-analysis of 79 empirical studies with youth samples (up to age 18) found that the mean prevalence of receiving a sext was 31% while the mean prevalence of sending a sext was 14%.

According to professor Diane Kholos Wysocki, although both men and women participate in sexting, "women are more likely to sext than men". Men are more likely to initiate some form of intimate communication, like sending nude photographs or suggestive text messages. According to Amy Adele Hasinoff in the journal New Media & Society, when it comes to sexting, there is a big difference between sexual exploitation and a consensual decision to express one's sexuality and share an image of their own body with someone who wants to see it. Women are sexualized whenever they post or share any form of intimate media, while men are not. Hasinoff points out that "Many digital media scholars stress that the Internet can enable young people to explore their identities and develop social and communication skills" (Boyd, 2008; Tynes, 2007), and suggests that consensual sexting might serve a similar function for some people.

=== Sexting in relationships ===
Sexting is a prevalent and normalized practice among youth in many Western, liberal democracies. Many couples engage in sexting. In a 2011 study, 54% of the sample had sent explicit pictures or videos to their partners at least once, and one third of their sample had engaged in such activities occasionally.

In areas where gender roles traditionally expect men to initiate sexual encounters, sexting is used by women to offer nude images to male partners, allowing women greater latitude to instigate sex. However, a 2017 study found young women are significantly more likely than young men to be pressured into sending a nude photo by their partner.

In 2013, it was found that sexting is often used to enhance the relationship and sexual satisfaction in a romantic partnership. Sexting thus can be considered a "behaviour that ties into sexuality and the subsequent level of relationship satisfaction experienced by both partners". Based on the interviews conducted by Albury and Crawford, they discovered that sexting is commonly used in positive aspects. According to Albury and Crawford, sexting was not only an activity occurring in the context of flirtation or sexual relationships, but also between friends, as a joke or during a moment of bonding."

Reportedly, hedonism played a role in motivating sexting, and the length of relationship was negatively correlated with sexting behaviors. The study had a small sample size, so more research needs to be done surrounding sexting and motivation, but it is clear that sexting is a phenomenon that is not constrained to simply unattached individuals looking for fun; it is used by those in intimate relationships to increase feelings of intimacy and closeness to one's partner. For teens, sexting can also act as a prelude (or in lieu of) sexual activity, as an experimental phase for those who are yet to be sexually active, and for those who are hoping to start a relationship with someone. In a 2013 study conducted by Drouin et al., it was found that sexting is also associated with attachment styles, as those with attachment avoidance are more likely to engage in sexting behaviours (just as these individuals are also more likely to engage in casual sex). Thus, instead of increasing intimacy in these types of relationships, sexting may act as a buffer for physical intimacy.

A 2013 study found that sexting is prevalent among or young men who have sex with men (YMSM), and that YMSM that sext are more likely to be sexually active than those that do not.

== Risks ==
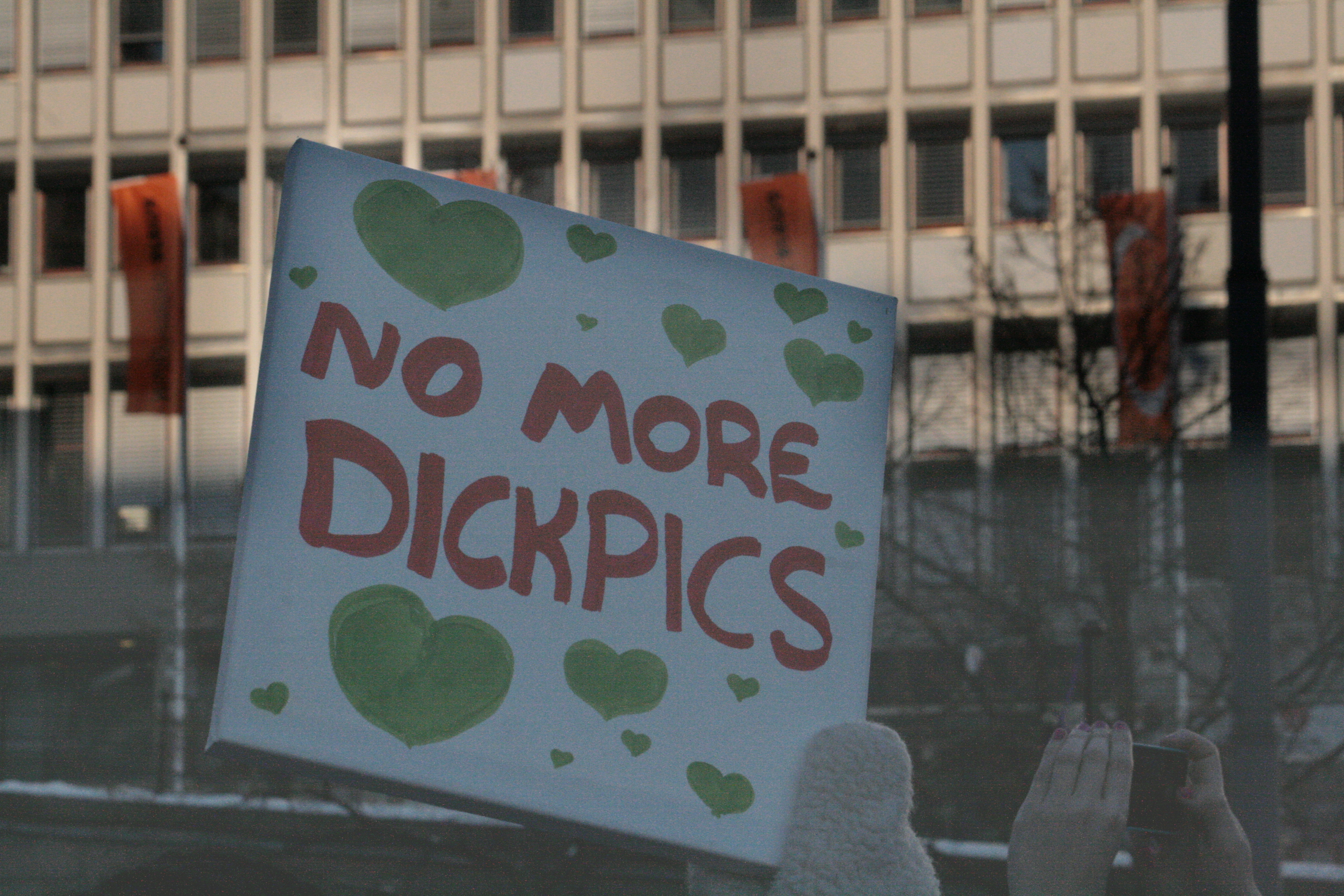
Sign at the 2018 Women's March in Oslo, reading, "No More Dickpics"

If a person sends an explicit image of themselves to a partner, then it can be against the law to re-transmit a copy of that image to another person without the consent of the originator. Some countries have revenge porn laws that prevent the publication of sexual images without the consent of all parties in the image. While there are many possible legal avenues for prosecution of people who knowingly breach the confidence of those sending sexual messages, in practice, nude images can be widely propagated without the consent of the originator.

Some young people blackmail their sexual partners and former partners by threatening to release private images of them. In a study conducted by Drouin et al. analyzing sexting behaviours among young adults, it was found that men would show the sexually explicit photos of their girlfriends to their friends.

Studies have shown that sex crimes using digital media against minors reflect the same kind of victimization that happens offline. Family members, acquaintances and intimate partners make up the mass majority of perpetrators for digital media sex crimes. Research by the Internet Watch Foundation in 2012, estimated that 88% of self-made explicit images are "stolen" from their original upload location (typically social networks) and made available on other websites, in particular porn sites collecting sexual images of children and young people. The report highlighted the risk of severe depression for "sexters" who lose control of their images and videos. Sexting is seen as irresponsible and promiscuous for adolescents, but "fun and flirty" for adults. These risks tend to be exaggerated by news media, especially in regard to adolescent girls.

The University of Utah study (with a population sample of 606 teens aged 14 to 18) stated that about one third of respondents did not consider legal or other consequences when receiving or sending sexts. Teenagers may not be thinking about the risks and repercussions when they participate in sexting; however, a study by Kath Albury titled Selfies, Sexts, and Sneaky Hats: Young People's Understandings of Gendered Practices of Self-Presentation shows that teenagers engaging in sexting were concerned that their parents may see or find out about their involvement with sexting. Some teenagers shared that their "main risks of parental discovery were embarrassment (for both parents and young people) and 'overreaction' from adults who feared the photo had been shared."

Creation and distribution of explicit photos of teenagers violates child pornography laws in many jurisdictions (depending on the age of the people depicted), but this legal restriction does not align with the social norms of the population engaging in the practice, which distinguish between consensual activity and harassment or revenge. Senders in some jurisdictions may also be charged with distribution of indecent material to a minor, and could be required to register as a sex offender for life. Child pornography cases involving teen-to-teen sexting have been prosecuted in Oregon, Virginia, Nova Scotia and Maryland.

While mainstream media outlets, parents, and educators are rightfully worried about the negative legal, social, and emotional ramifications of teen sexting, much less is said about the issue of sexual consent. According to a 2012 study conducted by professors at the University of New South Wales, due to child pornography laws that prohibit any minor from consenting to sexual activity, issues of consent among adolescent teens is seldom discussed. Much like the discourse surrounding "abstinence-only" education, the prevailing attitude towards sexting is how to prevent it from occurring rather than accepting its inevitability and channeling it in healthier ways. According to the study, instead of criminalizing teens who participate in sexting, the law should account for whether the images are shared consensually. This would mean adopting an "ethics" approach, one that teaches and guides teens on how to respect bodily autonomy and privacy. A 2019 Journal of Adolescent Health article authored by scholars Justin Patchin and Sameer Hinduja entitled "It's Time to Teach Safe Sexting" offers specific, actionable strategies towards this end within a harm reduction framework.

According to a study done by the health journal Pediatrics, more than one in five middle school minors with behavioral or emotional problems has recently engaged in sexting. Those individuals who have reported sexting in the past six months were four to seven times more likely to engage in other sexual activities such as intimate kissing, touching genitals, and having vaginal or oral sex, compared to minors who stated they did not partake in sexting. The study included 420 participants who were between the ages of 12 and 14 years old. The children were pulled from five urban public middle schools in Rhode Island between 2009 and 2012. Seventeen percent of the children tested claimed they had sent a sexually explicit text message in the past six months. Another five percent admitted to sending sexually explicit text messages and nude or semi-nude photos.

== Legal issues ==
Sexting that involves minors under the age of consent sending an explicit photograph of themselves to a romantic partner of the same age can be illegal in countries where child pornography laws require all participants in pornographic media to be over the age of majority. Some teenagers who have texted photographs of themselves, or of their friends or partners, have been charged with distribution of child pornography, while those who have received the images have been charged with possession of child pornography; in some cases, the possession charge has been applied to school administrators who have investigated sexting incidents as well. The images involved in sexting are usually different in both nature and motivation from the type of content that anti-child pornography laws were created to address.

A 2009 UK survey of 2,094 teens aged 11 to 18 found that 38% had received an "offensive or distressing" sexual image by text or email.

In the United States, anyone who is involved in the electronic distribution of sexual photos of minors can face state and federal charges of child pornography. The laws disregard the consent of parties involved: "...regardless of one's age or consent to sexting, it is unlawful to produce, possess, or distribute explicit sexual images of anyone under 18." The University of New Hampshire's Crimes Against Children Research Center estimates that 7 percent of people arrested on suspicion of child pornography production in 2009 were teenagers who shared images with peers consensually.

Kath Albury discusses in an article titled "Sexting, Consent, and Young People's Ethics: Beyond Megan's Story" that if teens are convicted of a sexting charge, they have to register as a sex offender, and this takes away the impact of the title of sex offender. According to Albury, a girl who agrees to send her girlfriend a naked picture is not as dangerous to the community as a child molester, but the charge of sex offender would be applied equally to both of these cases.

In a 2013 interview, assistant professor of communications at the University of Colorado Denver, Amy Adele Hasinoff, who studies the repercussions of sexting has stated that the "very harsh" child pornography laws are "designed to address adults exploiting children" and should not replace better sex education and consent training for teens. She went on to say, "Sexting is a sex act, and if it's consensual, that's fine..." "Anyone who distributes these pictures without consent is doing something malicious and abusive, but child pornography laws are too harsh to address it."

According to Amy Hasinoff, if sexting was viewed as media production and a consensual activity, this would change the legal assumption that sexting is always non-consensual and reduce the culpability of victimized youth. This turns sexting into a situation that would lead to different legal consequences when distribution of the material was not consented to by the creator. Alvin J. Primack, who draws from Amy Hasinoff's work, argued a media production model may be useful for distinguishing between child pornography and sexting from a First Amendment perspective. According to Alvin J. Primack, the motivation for creating and distributing sexts (e.g., pleasure, relationship building) differs from the motivation for creating and distributing child pornography (e.g., abuse, exploitation), and the market of circulation is generally different between the two as well. For these reasons, there may be arguments – grounded in reasoning provided by First Amendment doctrine – for finding some youth sexts exchanged between persons who are of the age of consent to be legally-protected speech.

Legal professionals and academics have expressed that the use of "child porn laws" with regard to sexting is "extreme" or "too harsh". Florida cybercrimes defense attorney David S. Seltzer wrote of this that "I do not believe that our child pornography laws were designed for these situations ... A conviction for possession of child pornography in Florida draws up to five years in prison for each picture or video, plus a lifelong requirement to register as a sex offender."

Academics have argued that sexting is a broad term for images being sent over Internet and cell phones, between minors, adults, or minors and adults, and in an abusive manner or in an innocent manner. In order to develop policy better suited for adolescent sexting cases, it is necessary to have better terms and categories of sexting. University of New Hampshire typology has suggested the term youth-produced sexual image to classify adolescent sexting. Furthermore, they branch into two sub-categories: aggravated and experimental youth-produced sexual image. Aggravated cases include cases of sexual assault, coercion, cyber-bullying, forwarding images without consent, and abusive behavior. Experimental cases are cases in which an adolescent willingly takes a picture and sends it to someone with no criminal intent and is attention-seeking.

=== Legal cases ===
- In 2007, 32 Australian teenagers from the state of Victoria were prosecuted as a result of sexting activity.
- In 2008, an assistant principal in the U.S. state of Virginia was charged with possession of child pornography and related crimes after he had been asked to investigate a rumored sexting incident at the high school where he worked. Upon finding a student in possession of a photo on his phone that depicted the torso of a girl wearing only underpants, her arms mostly covering her breasts, the assistant principal showed the image to the principal, who instructed him to preserve it on his computer as evidence, which he did. The court later ruled that the photo did not constitute child pornography because under Virginia law, nudity alone is not enough to qualify an image as child pornography; the image must be "sexually explicit". Loudoun County prosecutor James Plowman stood by his initial assessment of the photo and says he would not have pursued the case if the assistant principal had agreed to resign. Instead, the assistant principal took out a second mortgage on his house and spent $150,000 in attorneys' fees to clear his name.
- In January 2009, child pornography charges were brought against six teenagers in Greensburg, Pennsylvania, after three girls sent sexually explicit photographs to three male classmates.
- In 2009, a Fort Wayne, Indiana, teenage boy faced felony obscenity charges for allegedly sending a photo of his genitals to several female classmates. Another boy was charged with child pornography in a similar case.
- In 2009, police investigated an incident at Margaretta High School in Castalia, Ohio, in which a 17-year-old girl allegedly sent nude pictures of herself to her former boyfriend, and the pictures started circulating after they had a quarrel. The girl was charged with being an "unruly child" based on her juvenile status.
- In 2009, two southwest Ohio teenagers were charged with contributing to the delinquency of a minor, a first-degree misdemeanor, for sending or possessing nude photos on their cell phones of two 15-year-old classmates.
- On 25 March 2009, the American Civil Liberties Union filed a lawsuit against Wyoming County, Pennsylvania district attorney George Skumanick Jr. for threatening teenage girls who were the subject of allegedly risque photos with prosecution on child pornography charges if they did not submit to a counseling program. The case is Miller, et al. v. Skumanick. Skumanick stated in an interview with Julie Chen on CBS News's The Early Show that his office decided to make an offer of limiting penalties to probation if the girls agreed to attend a sexual harassment program. The girls and their parents won a ruling that blocked the district attorney, who appealed. It is the first appeals court case concerning sexting.
- In July 2010, Londonderry High School teacher Melinda Dennehy pleaded guilty and received a one-year suspended sentence for sending racy photos of herself to a 15-year-old student.
- In August 2014, a teen from Manassas City, Virginia, was placed on one year's probation after being charged with two counts of child pornography for allegedly sexting an explicit video to his 15-year-old girlfriend. The case become controversial after attempts by the Manassas city police and prosecutors to take pictures of the teen's erect penis as evidence to compare with the video he sent to his girlfriend in January.
- In November 2015, officials discovered widespread sexting at Cañon City High School in Colorado. Photos of at least 100 different students were involved, in what appeared to be a contest. District Attorney Thom LeDoux said consenting adults can send and receive sext messages, but minors can face felony charges for doing the same. Before deciding to prosecute, he said he would consider if coercion was involved, if adults were involved, and if actual physical contact was made. When The New York Times reported on this incident, the reporter referred to a book titled Sexting Panic, written by Adele Hasinoff, an assistant professor at the University of Colorado. Hasinoff said schools should talk to students about sexting, instead of simply demanding that they stop doing it.
- In September 2017, the Washington Supreme Court, by a vote of 5–3, upheld the child pornography trafficking conviction of a seventeen-year-old boy for texting a picture of his erect penis to an adult woman. The boy, who has Asperger syndrome, was sentenced to 50 hours of community service, 30 days' confinement, and registration as a sex offender.
- In March 2019, the school board of Bellport middle school (New York) fired a 25-year-old teacher after a photo surfaced, that she had taken at home sitting on the floor before a mirror, a towel draped across her legs and her breasts exposed. She had only shared the image with a colleague she was dating, who was not disciplined for the dissemination of the photograph among the students of the school. She has sued the school district and its administrators for gender discrimination, commenting "It's always the boys hurting the girls and the girls taking the brunt of it".

=== Legislative responses ===
In Connecticut, Rep. Rosa Rebimbas introduced a bill that would lessen the penalty for "sexting" between two consenting minors in 2009. The bill would make it a Class A misdemeanor for children under 18 to send or receive text messages with other minors that include nude or sexual images. The bill resulted in a joint favorable substitute.

Vermont lawmakers introduced a bill in April 2009 to legalize the consensual exchange of graphic images between two people 13 to 18 years old. Passing along such images to others would remain a crime.

In Ohio, a county prosecutor and two lawmakers proposed a law that would reduce sexting from a felony to a first-degree misdemeanor, and eliminate the possibility of a teenage offender being labeled a sex offender for years. The proposal was supported by the parents of Jesse Logan, a Cincinnati 18-year-old who committed suicide after the naked picture of herself which she sexted was forwarded to people in her high school.

In 2009, Utah lawmakers lessened the penalty for sexting for someone younger than 18 to a misdemeanor from a felony.

In New York, Assemblyman Ken Zebrowski (D-Rockland) has introduced a bill that will create an affirmative defense where a minor is charged under child pornography laws if they possesses or disseminate a picture of themselves or possess or disseminates the image of another minor (within 4 years of their age) with their consent. The affirmative defense will not be available if the conduct was done without consent. It also creates an educational outreach program for teens that promotes awareness about the dangers of sexting.

In the Australian state of Victoria, the law was reformed in 2014 to create a defence for young people who engage in consensual sexting and the introduction of the new offences of distribution of an intimate image, and threat to distribute an intimate image.

== See also ==
- Child pornography
- Cyberbullying
- Cyberflashing
- Cybersex
- Deviancy amplification spiral
- Dick pic
- Erotic talk
- iCloud leaks of celebrity photos
- Moral panic
- Phone sex
- Safe sex
- Text roulette
- Virtual sex
