= Cyberflashing =

Sending of obscene images to strangers via Internet services

The AirDrop icon. AirDrop has been used for cyberflashing.

Cyberflashing involves sending obscene pictures to strangers online, often done through Bluetooth or AirDrop transfers between devices.

The first mainstream coinage of the term occurred around 13 August 2015, after a female commuter was AirDropped two pictures of a penis. The case was reported to the British Transport Police who indicated that as the pictures were declined, insufficient data was recorded by the receiving phone and could not provide suitable evidence.

== Methodology ==
An appropriately equipped device can seek out any active peers within about 10 metres (32 ft 10 in). The harassing individual can make an initial connection with any device that is open to all users. A photo can then be sent with a preview of the photo being shown to the device's owner at the same time as a request to allow the connection. Therefore, the harassment (the "flashing") can occur before a specific connection is authorized.

== Incidents ==
On 13 August 2017, the New York Post reported that at least two women were sent nude pictures while commuting. A HuffPost reporter in the UK was also sent more than 100 sexual pictures while commuting. This case was reported to the British Transport Police, and when these news stories were published, several women indicated to the publications that they had suffered similar harassment. However, UK police forces indicate very few complaints about these actions despite "a growing awareness" of it occurring. This indicates a wide level of under-reporting and thus few arrests and prosecutions.

In Australia, in May 2018, it was reported that cyberflashing was increasingly common as a prank used by children, popular due to its ease in targeting multiple individuals very rapidly in a fairly unidentifiable fashion.

In Israel, in May 2022, an AnadoluJet flight aborted its takeoff at Ben Gurion Airport after pictures of airplane crashes were distributed among passengers via AirDrop.

== Legal issues ==
As with other technological-based abuses, such as deepfake pornography, revenge porn, and upskirting, there was no specific pre-existing law designed to criminalize and prevent cyberflashing. This means that many police forces were and are required to fall back on more generalized crimes such as harassment and outraging public decency.

In New South Wales, Australia, the Crimes Amendment (Intimate Images) Act 2017 was passed to make it an offense to "intentionally record or distribute, or threaten to record or distribute, an intimate image of a person without their consent". This legislation covers cyberflashing by its prohibition on distributing intimate images without consent.

In Singapore, cyberflashing, upskirt photography, and revenge porn have been criminalized since May 2019.

Cyberflashing ("coercing a person into looking at a sexual image") was made an offence in Scotland in 2010. In England and Wales, the Online Safety Act 2023 amended the Sexual Offences Act 2003 to create a new criminal offence of cyberflashing ("sending etc photograph or film of genitals"). The first conviction for cyberflashing in England occurred in March of 2024 following a guilty plea.

== Legislation ==
In the United States and United Kingdom, there have been several pieces of proposed legislation to combat cyberflashing. In April 2022, the state of Virginia passed Senate Bill 493, which prescribes civil penalties for an adult who knowingly sends another adult sexually explicit images without their consent. The U.K. government passed the Online Safety Act 2023 in October 2023. The CONSENT Act, a federal bill which “aims to provide protection for recipients of sexually explicit images, including images manipulated by artificial intelligence or machine learning", was introduced in the United States in 2024.

== See also ==
- Dick pic
- Exhibitionism
- Harassment
- Sexting
