= Tunkhannock Area School District =

School in Pennsylvania, U.S.

Coordinates: 41.48800°N 75.94436°W

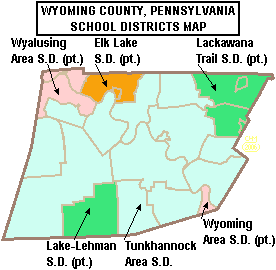

Address
- 41 Philadelphia Avenue Tunkhannock, Pennsylvania, 18657-1602; United States

District information
- Type: Public

Students and staff
- District mascot: Tiger
- Colors: Orange and black

Other information
- Website: www.tasd.net

Tunkhannock Area School District is a midsized rural/suburban public school district serving most of Wyoming County in northeast Pennsylvania in the United States. Tunkhannock Area School District encompasses approximately 397 square miles (1,030 km^{2}). According to 2010 federal census data, Tunkhannock Area School District served a resident population of 28,276. By 2010, the district's population declined sharply to 19,032 people. In 2009, the district residents’ per capita income was $18,112, while the median family income was $44,626. In the Commonwealth, the median family income was $49,501 and the United States median family income was $49,445, in 2010.

Tunkhannock Area School District has 4 schools - The Primary School (Kindergarten-2nd Grade), The Intermediate Center (3rd Grade-6th Grade), The Academy (7th Grade), and the Tunkhannock High School (8th Grade-12th Grade). The school mascot is the Tiger. The school district has undergone a recent change in structure, combining the elementary schools into one and adding a specialized academy for students attending the middle school to explore STEM skills.

== Extracurriculars ==
Tunkhannock Area School District offers a wide variety of clubs, activities and an extensive sports program.

=== Sports ===
The district funds:

Boys

- Baseball - AAA
- Basketball- AAA
- Cross country - AA
- Football - AAA
- Golf - AAA
- Lacrosse - AAAA
- Soccer - AA
- Swimming and diving - AA
- Tennis - AA
- Track and Field - AAA
- Volleyball - AA
- Wrestling - AAA

Girls

- Basketball - AAA
- Cross country - AA
- Field hockey - AA
- Golf - AAA
- Lacrosse - AAAA
- Soccer (fall) - AA
- Softball - AAA
- Swimming and diving - AA
- Girls' tennis - AA
- Track and field - AAA
- Volleyball - AA

Middle School Sports

Boys

- Baseball
- Basketball
- Cross country
- Football
- Soccer
- Track and field
- Wrestling

Girls

- Basketball
- Cross country
- Field hockey
- Soccer (fall)
- Softball
- Track and field

According to PIAA directory July 2013

== See also ==
- Miller v. Skumanick
