= Dick pic =

Digital photo of a penis, usually shared electronically

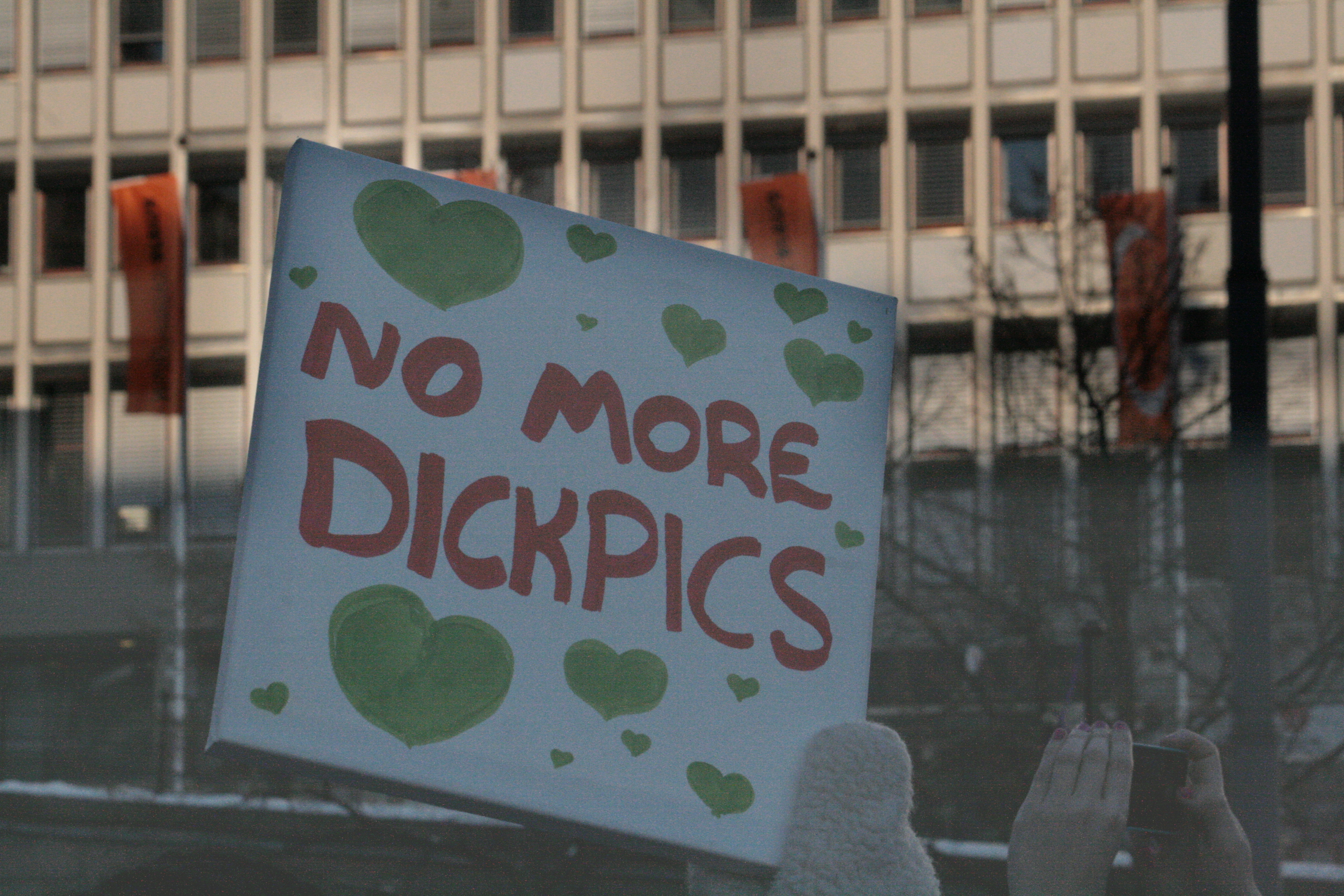
"No more dick pics" sign at a 2018 Women's March in Oslo

A dick pic is an image or photograph of a penis, usually erect, sent electronically (e.g. on the internet, by SMS, or by close-range file sharing). The term dick pic is derived from dick, slang for penis, and pic, a shortening of the word picture. Dick pics are a sexual practice and a form of sexting.

If the recipient consents, sexting (which may include sending dick pics) is associated with positive psychological and relationship outcomes.

If sent without the consent of the recipient, they may be a form of exhibitionism or sexual harassment (cyberharassment). Some countries, such as the United Kingdom, have laws against the sending of unsolicited nude images. Unsolicited dick pics are often sent by private message on social networks; a number of cases are known of dick pics received on the Russian social-networking service Vkontakte and Facebook. Dick pics are also sometimes sent through local file-sharing programs (such as AirDrop) to unknown recipients, a practice known as cyberflashing.

== Analysis ==
Although women, non-binary people and transgender men may engage in sexting and sending genital images, dick pics are commonly understood to be a cisgender male activity. There is no widespread female counterpart to the unsolicited dick pic; unsolicited genital images are overwhelmingly sent by men.

Motivations for sending a dick pic vary widely, as do responses to receiving one. Like sexting in general, the sending and receiving of solicited dick pics is common among adults; motivated by positive factors like relationship enhancement, it is linked to positive psychological outcomes. The sending of an unsolicited dick pic may be motivated by positive or negative factors, and recipients of unsolicited dick pics may react positively or negatively; women tend to react negatively, and homosexual men tend to react positively.

=== Motivations for sending unsolicited dick pics ===
The sender of an unsolicited dick pic may do so under the assumption that recipients will be excited or impressed by the penis or the boldness of the gesture. A demonstration of masculinity (particularly toxic masculinity), it is indicative of narcissism. A 2019 study in the Journal of Sex Research demonstrates that senders of unsolicited dick pics tend to have narcissistic personality traits. Some senders say that they are looking for admiration of their virility, or think of the act as flirtation. Behavioral problems due to psychological trauma may contribute to narcissism.

Disregarding recipient desire is characteristic of hostile sexism, sexual deviance and hedonism. The vast majority of victims view unsolicited dick pics as offensive.

By deliberately crossing boundaries, the sender simulates courage and attempts to assert dominance (sometimes aware of their negative consequences). Rejection and criticism may lead to retaliatory abusive and aggressive behavior as the receiver compensates for the power difference and does not validate the sender's dominance or masculinity. The negative reactions of the receiving party (often anger or disgust) may not be motivated by the photo itself, but by its unsolicited nature.

According to researchers, men tend to overestimate female sexual interest in them for evolutionary reasons; women tend to underestimate men's sexual interest in them. This overestimation (sexual overperception bias) may cause a man to feel entitled to positive feedback from a recipient – typically a woman – and assume that the sexually aroused recipient will reciprocate.

Australian psychologist Andrea Woling published a 2017 study saying that dick pics are a primitive way to interest an interlocutor, get acquainted, and indicate one's intentions. Surveys of men who sent dick pics indicate that most expected to receive intimate photos in return. Dick pics may also be a form of Internet trolling, with women saying that unfamiliar users sent them an unsolicited dick pic after they refused to meet or ignored a greeting.

=== Reactions to receiving unsolicited dick pics ===
This behavior, when unwanted, is typical of a heterosexual, cisgender male who sends an image to whom they see as a cisgender female. Men identifying as gay or bisexual who receive unsolicited phallic imagery perceive it as positive more often than other demographics – more than half of such men, according to one study. Forty-four percent of men who have sex with men (MSM) reported being "entertained" and 41% felt "curious" after receiving a dick pic; 25 percent of MSM reported a negative reaction. Data suggests that MSM feel pressured to suppress their negative feelings about unsolicited dick pics; the same study found that 7.5 percent of heterosexual women and 12 percent of bisexual women reported feeling aroused by at least one unsolicited dick pic they received.

== Prevalence ==
According to a 2016 U.S. survey, 49 percent of women had received at least one unsolicited photo of male sex organs. In a late-2017 survey, 78 percent of women aged 18 to 34 and 69 percent of women aged 35 to 54 said that they had received at least one dick pic without prior consent. Seventeen percent of men admitted sending an unsolicited genital image.

According to a 2019 survey in the United States, 27 percent of young adult males had sent such unsolicited photos. Their motivations were:

- hoping to receive a similar picture in return (44 percent);
- finding a partner (33 percent), hoping to arouse the recipient, or believing it a normal way of flirting;
- sexual excitement from exhibitionism (27 percent);
- a sense of power and control (nine percent);
- pleasure in the insults likely to follow (eight percent);
- unresolved childhood conflicts (six percent);
- offending or embarrassing the recipient (six percent).

Only 27 percent of those who repeatedly sent dick pics said that they would rather receive a positive than a negative response. Most of the time, no response is received.

In a 2017 YouGov survey, 2,121 women and 1,738 men between the ages of 18 and 36 were asked about dick pics. Forty-six percent of the women said that they had received such a photo, 89 percent of which were unsolicited. Of the men, 30 percent said they had been asked by a woman to send them a dick pic; 22 percent said that they had simply sent one. Of the men who had sent a dick pic, 21 percent said that they did so without being asked. According to Freudian psychoanalyst Caroline Ledu, these men unconsciously seek to "arouse anguish" by confronting their (female) victims with what they feel their bodies lack.

Social networks (Twitter, Instagram, and Snapchat) and dating sites (Tinder and, particularly, Chatroulette and Omegle) are the most-used vectors. According to a 2011 Boston survey, one-quarter of webcams are pointed at penises. The study looked at the adults-only network fantasti.cc:, where 23 percent of men's profile pictures include their penises and 13 percent use a penis picture found on the Internet.

Ovidie said in 2019 that almost all French high-school girls had received a dick pic from a social network (particularly Snapchat), and exhibitionists had adopted new technology to shock and dominate. An October 2018 IFOP survey found that 42 percent of female users of dating sites had received a dick pic there; the percentage increased to 63 percent of women aged 18 to 24.

A 2020 US study by Marcotte et al. asked 2,045 women and 298 bisexual and gay men about receiving unsolicited penis photos and their experiences with them. Of those who had received a dick pic (49.6 percent of women and 80.5 percent of men), over 90 percent were unsolicited. Women (regardless of sexual orientation) reacted mainly negatively, with feelings of disgust (50 percent) and disrespect (46 percent). Twenty-six percent of women said that they responded positively to unsolicited dick pics, and 7.6 percent of women (7.5 percent heterosexual and 11.9 percent bisexual) reported being sexually aroused. Of the men, 71 percent said they reacted positively to unsolicited penis photos. "Entertained" (44 percent) and "curious" (40.6 percent) were the most-frequent choices, and 33.6 percent reported sexual arousal. Twenty-five percent of the men reacted negatively to unsolicited dick pics. The study found that younger women and women who had received unwanted advances from men were more likely to react negatively to dick pics.

=== Legislation ===
In French law, the practice can be considered as an act of exhibitionism punishable by one year of imprisonment and a €15,000 fine in accordance with article 232-22 of the penal code. Article R.624-2 provides for a €750 fine for anyone who sends an unsolicited indecent message. Repeated practice will be considered harassment, punishable by two to three years of imprisonment and a fine of 30,000 to 45,000 euros depending on the age of the victim. If the recipient is a minor, the penalty is seven years in prison and a €100,000 fine. In 2019, a Roanne court sentenced a repeat offender to three years in prison after complaints from 49 victims from 12 to 90 years old. In Texas, the sender of an unsolicited dick pic is subject to a $500 fine. As of 2021, Finland was preparing a bill introducing a penalty of up to six months in prison.

In 2018, a bill was proposed in New York City which included a fine and up to a year in jail for cyberflashing.

According to Article 240, paragraph 2 of the Dutch criminal code, sending an inappropriate dick pic is a sex offense. In 2018, a man in the Netherlands who sent digital dick pics was sentenced by a court to 80 hours of community service (half of which was conditional) and to pay €372 to the victim. In 2022, the Netherlands asserted that the unsolicited sending of a dick pic was punishable by two months in prison or a fine of up to €9,000.

Unsolicited sending is a criminal offense in Germany, according to § 184 (unauthorized distribution of pornographic material) of the criminal code. The act is punishable by imprisonment of up to one year or a fine.

== Consequences for senders ==
Risks are involved in creating and sending dick pics; sending these images without consent can have legal consequences if the recipient reports sexual harassment. The image can also take on a life of its own and pop up in unexpected places; American artist Whitney Bell devoted a photo exhibition to dick pics she had received. An innocently intended image can also have adverse consequences; in 2019, Jeff Bezos was blackmailed with images intended for his mistress from his hacked phone. Twenty-three percent of people who sent dick pics reported sharing them with at least three other people.

=== Media ===
Due to the popularity of BOOS: This is The Voice in January 2022, the unsolicited reception of such images has attracted considerable attention in the Netherlands. Marc Overmars resigned as director of football affairs at Ajax because of allegations which included the sending of dick pics.

=== Politicians ===
At least two politicians have been convicted of transmitting dick pics: former congressman and New York City mayoral candidate Anthony Weiner (sentenced in 2017 to 21 months in prison for sending sex photos to women between 2011 and 2013, including one minor) and Le Havre, France, Mayor Luc Lemonnier, who was forced to resign in 2019 after several women reported receiving dick pics from him since 2011.

== Reactions ==
Some women respond with insults or other people's dick pics. Social network pages ridicule such behavior, collecting witty responses to dick pics.

Other creative responses include:

- Denouncing the activity's intrusive nature; American artist Whitney Bell staged installations in which tens of dick pics decorate the walls of an apartment, like paintings. Bell said that she wanted to show that unauthorized dick pics violate a woman's personal space and cause a feeling of insecurity even in her own home.
- A British woman shared on social networks a formal, humorous letter in which she explains to senders that their photo "does not meet (her) most basic quality criteria" and gives them mental-health advice.
- New Zealander Madeleine Holden has created a site where she evaluates and rates the "photographic quality" of the dick pics she receives.

=== Combating and preventing dick pics ===
There is no single algorithm for prohibiting or combating dick pics. Many social networks prohibit the publication of pornographic material, but the ban does not apply to private messages. A complaint about the user can be filed with technical support, but sanctions would be applied after the picture is received; an offensive user can create a new account, and continue sending dick pics from there. In 2019, faced with the inaction of major social networks (which would prove, if they censored private messages, that they were accessing their users' personal data), web developer Kelsey Bressler created a Twitter application capable of blocking 95% of dick pics using artificial intelligence. The Bumble app also introduced a similar filter. In 2020, the dating app Once implemented a similar artificial intelligence algorithm to detect photos of penises and turn them into kittens. Meta is reportedly developing an algorithm allowing a user to immediately block and delete intimate messages using photo-recognition technology, but by February 2022 it had been unsuccessful.

== See also ==
- Cyberbullying
- Cybersex
- Exhibitionism
- Revenge porn
