= West Gippsland Hospital =

- West Gippsland Healthcare Group

Geography
- Location: 41 Landsborough St, Warragul Victoria 3820, Australia
- Coordinates: 38.1729°S 145.9278°E

History
- Founded: 1888

Links
- Website: wghg.com.au

West Gippsland Hospital is a regional hospital in Warragul, Victoria, first established in 1888 on land donated by a local resident, Mary Sargeant.

The current hospital is an 83-bed facility with an additional 60 beds available in the adjoining Cooinda Lodge Nursing Home.
