= Florian Andrighetto =

Australian politician

Florian Andrighetto (born 24 February 1953) is an Australian politician. He was a Liberal Party member of the Victorian Legislative Assembly from 1996 to 1999, representing the electorate of Narracan.

Andrighetto was born in Fara, Italy. He served in the Victoria Police from 1976 to 1996, serving for the last six of those years as a police prosecutor. He also served as a member of the Tarago Water Board from 1991 to 1994, including a stint as chairman from 1993 to 1994.

Andrighetto was preselected as the Liberal candidate for the Liberal-held seat of Narracan for the 1996 state election, defeating current Narracan MLA Gary Blackwood. He went on to defeat Labor candidate and future Morwell MLA Brendan Jenkins in the election.

He attracted attention in December 1997 when he aired claims in parliament that high-profile trade unionist and former Victorian Trades Hall Council secretary John Halfpenny had been claiming WorkCover benefits while working as a consultant. Andrighetto's speech led to an investigation, and Halfpenny was subsequently charged and found guilty of defrauding WorkCover. In 1998, he chaired a committee which recommended a significant tightening of alcohol-based criminal defences after a public outcry over the acquittal on assault charges of rugby league player Noa Nadruku.

Andrighetto was defeated amidst the Kennett government's loss at the 1999 state election by Labor candidate Ian Maxfield. He attributed his defeat to Kennett's ban on candidates and MPs speaking to the media during the campaign and resentment against the Kennett government in regional areas. He returned to the police force after his defeat, working in the ethical standards department, but subsequently retrained as a lawyer, gaining a degree from Deakin University in 2002 and gaining admission to the bar. He was the defence lawyer for Mikhail Zubkov, the father of Ukrainian swimmer Kateryna Zubkova after a heavily-publicised altercation at the 2007 FINA World Swimming Championships which saw Zubkov subject to a restraining order.

Victorian Legislative Assembly
Preceded by John Delzoppo	Member for Narracan; 1996-1999	Succeeded by Ian Maxfield
