= Michelle Drouin =

American researcher

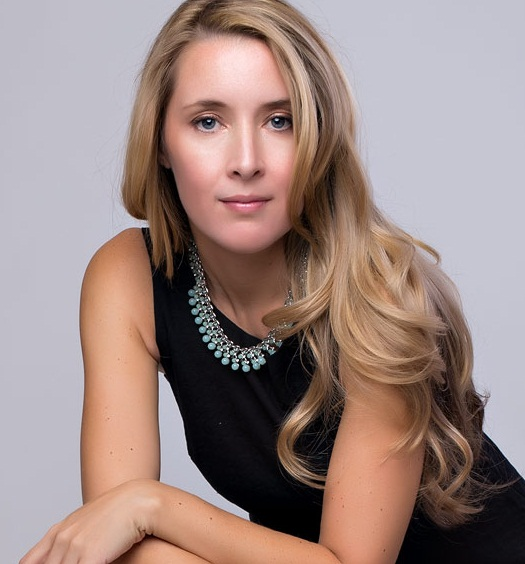
- Dr. Michelle Drouin, 2014
- Born: February 26, 1974 (age 52); Chicago Heights, Illinois, US
- Education: University of Oxford, 2004 (D.Phil., Experimental Psychology); Cornell University, 1996 (B.A., Psychology)
- Occupation: Associate Professor of Psychology, Indiana University Purdue University Fort Wayne
- Website: drmichelledrouin.com

Michelle Drouin is an American researcher who focuses on psychological issues dealing with social media and communications technology. Drouin is associate professor of psychology at Indiana University – Purdue University Fort Wayne.

== Research ==
Drouin has studied deception during sexting, and how texting and sexting affect attachment in relationships between college students, as well as between adult relationships. She found correlations between coercive sexting and mental health problems, as well as links between Internet trolling and sadism. She described how people sometimes use social media to maintain back-burner relationships to keep alive connections to possible future romantic partners. Much of her research focuses on social media sites such as Facebook; for example, she found that some people make new romantic connections by friending people on Facebook. She studied the issue of phantom vibrations experienced by many cell phone users in which a phone seems to vibrate but doesn't; a study she conducted found that 89% of students experienced a phantom vibration at least once every two weeks. She found that people were more likely to experience phantom vibrations if they expected to react emotionally to incoming communications. Her research found that young adults generally do not support the practice of employers using social media when making hiring decisions.
