= Wayne Farnham =

Australian politician

Wayne Farnham MP

Member of the Victorian Legislative Assembly for Narracan
- Incumbent
- Assumed office 28 January 2023
- Preceded by: Gary Blackwood

Personal details
- Party: Liberal
- Education: Warragul Technical College
- Occupation: Construction company owner

Wayne Farnham is an Australian politician, currently the Liberal Party member for the electoral district of Narracan in the Victorian Legislative Assembly. He was elected in 2023 at a supplementary election, held because The Nationals candidate for seat at the 2022 state election, Shaun Gilchrist, died after the close of nominations but before the election date.

Farnham is the Deputy Chair of the Electoral Matters Committee for the Parliament of Victoria.
