= John Delzoppo =

Australian politician (1931–2024)

John Delzoppo (3 December 1931 – 23 November 2024) was an Australian politician who was Speaker of the Victorian Legislative Assembly from 1992 to 1996, during the first years of the government of Liberal premier Jeff Kennett.

Delzoppo was born in the Melbourne suburb of Flemington in 1931 and attended University High School. He gained entry to the Victorian College of Pharmacy and, after graduating, worked as a pharmaceutical chemist for several years.

Delzoppo was first elected to the Victorian Parliament at the 1982 Victorian state election, as the member for the electorate of Narracan. In Opposition, he held a number of parliamentary party positions, including shadow minister for Transport, Local Government, Water Resources, and Property and Services, and he served on the parliamentary Public Accounts and Estimates Committee.

Delzoppo was also a councillor at the Shire of Buln Buln for 20 years and served as mayor on three occasions. He retired from the Victorian Parliament in 1996.

Delzoppo was married with two sons and two daughters. He died on 23 November 2024, at the age of 92.

Victorian Legislative Assembly
Preceded by Jim Balfour	Member for Narracan; 1982–1996	Succeeded by Florian Andrighetto
