= Phantom vibration syndrome =

False belief of one's mobile phone vibrating or ringing

Phantom vibration syndrome or phantom ringing syndrome is the perception that one's mobile phone is vibrating or ringing when it is not. Other terms for this concept include ringxiety (a portmanteau of ring and anxiety), fauxcellarm (a portmanteau of "faux" /foʊ/ meaning "fake" or "false" and "cellphone" and "alarm" pronounced similarly to "false alarm"), phonetom (a portmanteau of phone and phantom) and phantom phone signals. According to Michael Rothberg, it is not a syndrome, but is better characterised as a tactile hallucination since the brain perceives a sensation that is not actually present. WebMD published an article on phantom vibration syndrome with Rothberg as a source. Several other articles have been published in 2010s, including in NPR, Bustle, CBS News, and Psychology Today.

Phantom ringing may be experienced while taking a shower, watching television, or using a noisy device. Humans are particularly sensitive to auditory tones between 1,000 and 6,000 hertz, and basic mobile phone ringtones often fall within this range. Phantom vibrations develop after carrying a cell phone set to use vibrating alerts. Researcher Michelle Drouin found that almost 9 out of 10 undergraduates at her college experienced phantom vibrations.

== History ==
In the comic strip Dilbert, cartoonist Scott Adams referenced such a sensation in 1996 as "phantom-pager syndrome". The earliest published use of the term phantom vibration syndrome dates to 2003 in an article entitled "Phantom Vibration Syndrome" published in the New Pittsburgh Courier, written under a pen name of columnist Robert D. Jones. However, it is debated whether earlier noting of the onsets of PVS came from Michael J Lewis of Melbourne, Australia. In the conclusion of the article, Jones wrote, "...should we be concerned about what our mind or body may be trying to tell us by the aggravating imaginary emanations from belts, pockets and even purses? Whether PVS is the result of physical nerve damage, a mental health issue, or both, this growing phenomenon seems to indicate that we may have crossed a line in this 'always on' society."

The first study of the phenomenon was conducted in 2007 by a researcher who coined the term ringxiety to describe it. In 2012, the term phantom vibration syndrome was chosen as the Australian Macquarie Dictionary's word of the year.

== Causes ==
The cause of phantom vibrations is not known. Preliminary research suggests it is related to over-involvement with one's cell phone, as smartphone dependence is associated with occurrence of phantom phone signals. Vibrations typically begin occurring after carrying a phone for between one month and one year. It has been suggested that, when anticipating a phone call, the cerebral cortex may misinterpret other sensory input (such as muscle contractions, pressure from clothing, or music) as a phone vibration or ring tone. This may be understood as a human signal detection issue, with potentially significant influences from psychological attributes. Factors such as experiences, expectations, and psychological states influence the threshold for signal detection. Some phantom vibration experiences may be a type of pareidolia and can therefore be examined as a psychological phenomenon influenced by individual variances in personality, condition, and context. Attachment anxiety can also be seen as a predictor for the frequency of phantom vibration experiences since it is associated with psychological attributes related to insecurity in interpersonal relationships. Research shows that phantom phone signals may have different mechanisms than experiences similar to auditory hallucinations.

== Epidemiology ==
In most studies, a majority of cell phone users report experiencing occasional phantom vibrations or ringing, with reported rates ranging from 29.6% to 89%. Once every two weeks is a typical frequency for the sensations, though a minority experience them daily. Some individuals may be seriously bothered by the sensations.

== Management ==
Little research has been done on treatment for phantom vibrations. Carrying the cell phone in a different position reduces phantom vibrations for some people. Other methods include turning off the vibration, changing the ringtone or vibration tone, or using a different device altogether.
