= Ian Maxfield =

Australian politician

Ian John Maxfield (born 23 June 1959) is a former Australian politician.

Born in Warragul, Victoria, Maxfield graduated from Drouin High School in 1976. In 1979, he received an A-Grade Electrical Mechanic and Motor Control certificate from Noble Park TAFE and became an electrician. In 1986, he became an organiser with the Shop Assistants Union.

In 1999, Maxfield was elected to the Victorian Legislative Assembly as the Labor member for the Liberal-held seat of Narracan, defeating sitting member Florian Andrighetto. He held the seat until 2006, when he lost to Liberal candidate Gary Blackwood, in a surprise defeat.

Parliament of Victoria
| Preceded by Florian Andrighetto | Member for Narracan; 1999–2006 | Succeeded by Gary Blackwood |
