= Richard Drouin =

Canadian lawyer and businessman

- Born: April 8, 1932 (age 92); Quebec City, Quebec
- Occupation(s): lawyer and businessman
- Awards: Order of Canada; National Order of Quebec

Richard R. Drouin, CC OQ KC (born April 8, 1932) is a Canadian lawyer and businessman.

Born in Quebec City, he studied at Collège Jean-de-Brébeuf in Montreal and studied law at the Université Laval. He was called to the Quebec Bar in 1957 and was created a Queen's Counsel in 1972. A practicing lawyer, he is a partner with McCarthy Tétrault. From 1988 to 1995, he was the chairman and CEO of Hydro-Québec.

In 1995, he was appointed to the board of directors of Abitibi-Consolidated Inc. and was chairman of the board from 2001 to 2006. He is the former chairman of the board of trustees of the North American Electric Reliability Corporation.

In 2004, he was made an Officer of the National Order of Quebec. In 1993, he was made an Officer of the Order of Canada and was promoted to Companion in 2006. He is a Fellow of the Royal Canadian Geographical Society.
