= Electoral district of Narracan =

State electoral district of Victoria, Australia

Narracan Victoria—Legislative Assembly
- Interactive map of electoral district boundaries from the 2022 state election
- State: Victoria
- Created: 1967
- MP: Wayne Farnham
- Party: Liberal
- Namesake: Narracan
- Electors: 52,203 (2018)
- Area: 4,503 km^{2} (1,738.6 sq mi)
- Demographic: Rural
Electorates around Narracan:
Monbulk	Eildon	Gippsland East
Pakenham	Narracan	Gippsland South
Bass	Gippsland South	Morwell

The electoral district of Narracan is an electoral district of the Victorian Legislative Assembly in Australia. It was first proclaimed in 1967 and has usually been held by the Liberal Party.

The electorate covers the provincial Warragul–Drouin urban area, as well as many smaller rural towns in north west Gippsland.

The electoral district of Narracan is named after Narracan, a rural locality located in the narrow Narracan Creek Valley, 14 km south of Moe. The word "narracan" is believed to be derived from an Aboriginal word meaning crow.

== Members for Narracan ==
Member	Party	Term
Jim Balfour	Liberal	1967–1982
John Delzoppo	Liberal	1982–1996
Florian Andrighetto	Liberal	1996–1999
Ian Maxfield	Labor	1999–2006
Gary Blackwood	Liberal	2006–2022
Wayne Farnham	Liberal	2023–present

== Election results ==
2023 Narracan state supplementary election
Party	Candidate	Votes	%	±%
Liberal	Wayne Farnham	16,741	45.0	−10.6
Greens	Alyssa Weaver	4,132	11.1	+5.1
Independent	Tony Wolfe	4,110	11.0	+11.0
Democratic Labour	Sophia Camille De Wit	2,641	7.1	+7.1
Freedom	Leonie Blackwell	2,254	6.1	+6.1
One Nation	Casey Murphy	2,246	6.0	+6.0
Independent	Annemarie McCabe	1,437	3.9	+3.9
Liberal Democrats	Michael Abelman	1,325	3.6	+3.6
Family First	Brendan Clarke	1,089	2.9	+2.9
Animal Justice	Austin Cram	849	2.3	+2.3
Independent	Ian Honey	381	1.0	+1.0
Total formal votes		37,205	93.4	–1.4
Informal votes		2,619	6.6	+1.4
Registered electors		50,506		
Turnout		39,824	78.9	−5.9
Two-candidate-preferred result
Liberal	Wayne Farnham	23,448	63.0	+3.0
Independent	Tony Wolfe	13,757	37.0	+37.0
Liberal hold		Swing	+3.0	

Results after distribution of preferences
Party	Candidate	Votes	%	±%
Liberal	Wayne Farnham	19,230	51.7	
Independent	Tony Wolfe	6,891	18.5	
Greens	Alyssa Weaver	6,073	16.3	
Freedom	Leonie Blackwell	5,011	13.5	
