= Gary Blackwood (politician) =

Australian politician

Member of the Victorian Legislative Assembly for Narracan
- In office 25 November 2006 – 26 November 2022
- Preceded by: Ian Maxfield
- Succeeded by: Wayne Farnham

Personal details
- Born: 6 June 1951 (age 75) Warragul, Victoria
- Party: Liberal Party
- Children: 6
- Website: garyblackwood.com.au

Gary John Blackwood (born 6 June 1951) is a former Australian politician. He was a Liberal Party member of the Victorian Legislative Assembly between November 2006 and November 2022, representing the electorate of Narracan.

== Early life ==
Blackwood was born and raised in Warragul. He studied economics and politics at Monash Teachers College (later Rusden State College), but after a year of national service in 1972, followed his father into the timber industry, operating his own timber transport and harvesting business from 1973 to 2003. He served as the chief executive officer of the Victorian Forest Harvesting and Cartage Council from 2003 until his election to parliament in 2006.

== Political career ==
Blackwood first became involved in politics in 1992, when he was elected for a term as a councillor for the Rural City of Warragul. He was the campaign manager for Russell Broadbent during his successful bid for the federal seat of McMillan at the 1996 federal election and for the failed Liberal campaign in Narracan at the 2002 state election. Blackwood returned to local politics in 2003, with his election as a Shire of Baw Baw councillor, a role he held until his election to parliament. He was also involved in his local branch, serving as treasurer of the party's Narracan electorate council from 2001 until 2006.

Blackwood was preselected as the Liberal candidate for Narracan at the 2006 state election, and faced a difficult race against two-term incumbent Ian Maxfield, who held the seat with a margin of nearly 7%. Though the Liberals were badly beaten statewide, there was a strong swing against the government in the Gippsland region, and Blackwood achieved a narrow victory in one of the upset results of the election.

In 2010, Blackwood's two-party-preferred result increase his margin to 12.39 points, a swing of 9.74 points. Blackwood also received 56.67% of first preference votes, an increase of 14.64 points and the highest value of any elected member to the seat since its establishment in 1967.

Following the election of the Baillieu government in 2010 Blackwood was appointed Parliamentary Secretary for Forestry and Fisheries due to his experience within the industry. Later, he was appointed to the role of Parliamentary Secretary for Transport in the Napthine Government.

A redistribution saw Narracan's notional margin become 16.00 points before the 2014 Victorian Election. A swing to the Victorian Labor Party saw the seat return to an estimated 12.17-point margin following the defeat of the Napthine Government and Blackwood returned as member for Narracan for a third term. Though there was a swing against the government, Blackwood's first-preference vote remained steady.

Blackwood was challenged for pre selection by Stephanie Ross who is wife of Liberal power broker and alleged branch stacker Marcus Bastiaan Blackwood retained the seat from Ross. The challenge was seen as an attempt to oust MP aligned with Liberal opposition leader Matthew Guy. Blackwood voted against banning anti-abortion protesters from protesting outside abortion clinics.

In February 2022, Blackwood, along with Matthew Guy, Peter Walsh, David Davis and Melina Bath, were fined $100 each for breaching face mask rules, after the Coalition MPs were photographed maskless while attending an event in Parliament House.

Blackwood announced his retirement from politics on 9 November 2021 and did not contest the 2022 state election.

Victorian Legislative Assembly
Preceded by Ian Maxfield	Member for Narracan; 2006–2022	Succeeded by Wayne Farnham
