= Cordy =

Cordy is a surname, given name and nickname (short for Cordelia or Corydon) which may refer to:

== Surname ==
- Annie Cordy, stage name of Belgian film actress and singer Baroness Léonie Cooreman (born 1928)
- Ayce Cordy (born 1990), former Australian rules footballer
- Brian Cordy (born 1961), former Australian rules footballer
- Graeme Cordy (born 1962), former Australian rules footballer
- James Cordy (born 1950), Canadian computer scientist and educator
- Jane Cordy (born 1950), Canadian Senator representing Nova Scotia
- Michael Cordy, British novelist born in Ghana
- Napoleon Cordy (1902–1977), amateur scholar in the field of pre-Columbian Mesoamerican civilizations
- Neil Cordy (born 1959), former Australian rules footballer and now television presenter
- Raymond Cordy (1898–1956), French film actor born Raymond Cordiaux
- Ross Cordy, the branch chief of archaeology in the State of Hawaii's Historic Preservation Division
- Zaine Cordy (born 1996), Australian rules footballer

== Given name ==
- Cordy Glenn (born 1989), National Football League player
- Cordy Millowitsch (1890–1977), German actress and singer
- Cordy Ryman (born 1971), American artist
- C. T. Vivian (born 1924), American minister, author and close friend and lieutenant of Martin Luther King Jr.

== Nickname ==
- Cordelia Scaife May (1928–2005), American philanthropist
- Corydon Cordy Milne (1914–1978), American international motorcycle speedway rider

== Fiction ==
- Cordelia Cordy Chase, fictional character from the TV series Buffy the Vampire Slayer

== See also ==
- Cordy Mobilopter, 1930s experimental aircraft
- Alana Cordy-Collins, professor of anthropology at the University of San Diego
- Roddy Cordy-Simpson (born 1944), retired British Army general
