= Traralgon Football Club =

Names
- Full name: Traralgon Football Netball Club
- Nickname: Maroons

Club details
- Founded: 1883; 143 years ago
- Colours: Maroon White
- Competition: Gippsland League
- Premierships: List: 1900 GLVFL (17): 1960, 1963, 1964, 1965, 1968, 1969, 1972, 1978, 1980, 1987, 1990, 1991, 1992, 1994, 1998, 1999, 2000 WGLFL (1): 2005 GFL (2): 2011, 2015
- Ground: Traralgon Reserve

Uniforms
Home

Other information
- Official website: tfnc.com.au

The Traralgon Football Netball Club, nicknamed the Maroons, is an Australian rules football and netball club based in the regional Victorian city of Traralgon.

Traralgon was formed in 1883 and has competed in the Gippsland League almost continuously since 1954. The club was briefly a member of the Victorian Football League (VFL) between 1996 and 1997, but withdrew after winning only four games in its two seasons.

== Club history ==
The first published football match was a game in Traralgon against Warragul in 1883, resulting in a win to Traralgon.

Mr. H West won the club's Best All-Round player in 1884 with 12 votes.

In 1885, Traralgon hosted Essendon Football Club in a game, but were soundly beaten.

Traralgon once again hosted Essendon in 1886, but this time Traralgon (8.12 - 60) defeated Essendon (3.5 - 23).

In 1890, Traralgon FC's home ground was the Recreation Reserve.

After being in recess in 1894, the "new"club was formed in May, 1895, with the club adopting the colours of red and white.

The Traralgon FC and the Rovers FC merged in 1907 to form the Traralgon United FC and played in the West Gippsland Football Association.

In 1911, the club's color's were red and black.

The Traralgon Junior FC was formed in 1918 to provide a form of recreation for the youth of the town. The club colours for 1919 "would be the same as last year, viz, a maroon guernsey, white shorts and maroon socks".

Traralgon also played in the Victorian Football League (VFL) from 1996 to 1997.

== Football Competitions Timeline ==
- Gippsland Football Association
  - 1889 to 1890 - (1890 - The Kennedy Cup)
- Robinson's Challenge Cup
  - 1891
- Pettit Challenge Cup
  - 1892
- No competition matches, but did play a number of friendly matches against other local towns.
  - 1893
- Traralgon FC in recess
  - 1894
- No competition matches, but did play a number of friendly matches against other local towns.
  - 1895
- Traralgon Football Association
  - 1896 to 1898
- Hall's Trophy
  - 1899
- Traralgon Football Association (Ord Trophy)
  - 1900 to 1905
- West Gippsland Football Association
  - 1906 to 1907
- ? Football Association
  - 1908
- Central Gippsland Football Association
  - 1909 & 1910
- Traralgon & District Football Association
  - 1911
- Morwell & District Football Association
  - 1912 & 1913
- North Gippsland Football Association
  - 1914 & 1915. 1915 season abandoned in July due to WW1
- Club in recess, due to WW1
  - 1916 to 1918
- North Gippsland Football Association
  - 1919 & 1920
- Gippsland Football League: (GFL)
  - 1921 to 1935
- Central Gippsland Football League: (CGFL)
  - 1936 to 1940;
- Club in recess, World War II
  - 1941 to 1943;
- Central Gippsland Wartime Football League
  - 1944 & 1945
- Central Gippsland Football League
  - 1946 - 1953
- LaTrobe Valley Football League
  - 1954 - 1995
- Victorian Football League: (VFL)
  - 1996–1997
- Gippsland LaTrobe Football League
  - 1996 to 2001
- West Gippsland LaTrobe Football League
  - 2002 to 2004
- Gippsland Football League
  - 2005 to 2021

== Senior Football Premierships ==
- Traralgon Football Association
  - 1900 (Ord Trophy)
  - 1904 (Tory Trophy)
- Traralgon & District Football Association
  - 1911 (Mrs Kelly's Trophy)
- Morwell & District Football Association
  - 1912
- North Gippsland Football Association
  - 1919
- Gippsland FL
  - 1923, 1925
- Central Gippsland Football League
  - 1946, 1947, 1949
- Gippsland Latrobe Valley Football League (GLVFL)
  - 1960, 1963, 1964, 1965, 1968, 1969, 1972, 1978, 1980, 1987, 1990, 1991,1992, 1994, 1998, 19999, 2000
- West Gippsland Latrobe Football League
  - 2005
- Gippsland Football League
  - 2011, 2015, 2024

== League Best & Fairest Winners ==
Senior Football

- Gippsland Football League (Trood Award)
  - 1927 - Tom Standing
  - 1928 - Tom Standing
  - 1929 - Tom Standing
  - 1930 - Tom Standing
- Central Gippsland Football League (Rodda Medal)
  - 1938 - Jack Scott
  - 1948 - Jack Collins
- Central Gippsland Wartime Football League (Rex Hartley Memorial Medal)
  - 1944 - Dick King
- LaTrobe Valley Football League (Trood Award / Rodda Medal)
  - 1956 - Noel Alford
  - 1966 - Terry Hunter
  - 1967 - George Brayshaw
  - 1977 - Peter Hall
  - 1984 - Peter Hall
  - 1986 - Jim Silvestro
  - 1987 - Jim Silvestro
  - 1990 - John McDonald
  - 1992 - Greg Morley
- Gippsland LaTrobe Football League
  - 1997 - Neil Robertson
  - 1998 - Greg Morley
- West Gippsland LaTrobe Football League
  - 2003 - Greg Morley
- Gippsland Football League
  - 2009 - Michael Geary

== VFL / AFL Players ==
The following footballers played with Traralgon FC prior to making their senior VFL / AFL debut.

- 1897 - David Adamson - South Melbourne
- 1908 - Ernie Abbott - St. Kilda
- 1923 - Bill Roberts - South Melbourne
- 1932 - Jack Anderson - Richmond
- 1933 - Ray Harry - Carlton
- 1939 - Jack Scott - Richmond
- 1940 - Kevin Curran - Hawthorn
- 1941 - Fred Jones - Hawthorn
- 1947 - Jack Roberts - Richmond
- 1950 - Keith McKee - Geelong
- 1955 - Alan Anton - Fitzroy
- 1955 - Barry Archbold - Carlton
- 1957 - Bob Turner - Melbourne
- 1961 - Max McMahon - Hawthorn
- 1963 - Paul Harrison - South Melbourne
- 1966 - Max Thomas - Carlton
- 1969 - Bernie Quinlan - Footscray
- 1972 - Ralph Thomas - Footscray
- 1974 - Geoff Jennings - Footscray
- 1974 - Kelvin Templeton - Footscray
- 1976 - Peter Munro - Footscray
- 1979 - Neil Cordy - Footscray
- 1982 - Allan Jennings - Footscray
- 1981 - Brian Cordy - Footscray
- 1981 - Rick Kennedy - Footscray
- 1985 - Graeme Cordy - Footscray
- 1988 - Adrian Campbell - Footscray
- 1988 - Jim Silvestro - Sydney Swans
- 1995 - Craig Biddiscombe - Geelong
- 2011 - Jordan Cunico - Geelong
- 2013 - Tim Membrey - Sydney Swans, St. Kilda

The following footballers came to Traralgon FC after playing senior VFL / AFL football, with the year indicating their first season with Traralgon FC.

- 1904 - Dr. Tom McLean - Collingwood & Geelong
- 1925 - Ted Brown - St. Kilda & Carlton
- 1927 - Jack Sherman - Footscray
- 1952 - Bill Welsh - Collingwood
- 1954 - Alf Callick - South Melbourne
- 1955 - Noel Alford - North Melbourne
- 1955 - Keith Schaefer - South Melbourne
- 1975 - Peter Hall - Carlton
- 1990 - Geoff Cunningham - St. Kilda
- 1997 - Greg Doyle - St. Kilda & Melbourne
- 1997 - Geoff Hocking - Carlton
- 2013 - Brendan Fevola - Carlton & Brisbane
- 2013 - Nick Stevens - Port Adelaide & Carlton

== VFL Seasons ==
1996

Traralgon's first season in the VFL was unsuccessful. They finished in last place on the VFL ladder, having won only once for the season - defeating North Ballarat in round 4.

1997

Traralgon fared slightly better in their second season in the league, winning three matches for the year, and drawing once. Traralgon's win over Coburg in round 5 was their only victory away from their home ground during their short stint in the VFL.

VFA Honourboard

Year	Ladder position	Coach	Captain	Best & Fairest
1996	11th	Geoff Cunningham	Greg Morley	Craig Jennings
1997	10th	Geoff Hocking	Greg Morley	Greg Doyle
