= Rosedale, Victoria =

Rosedale
- Town
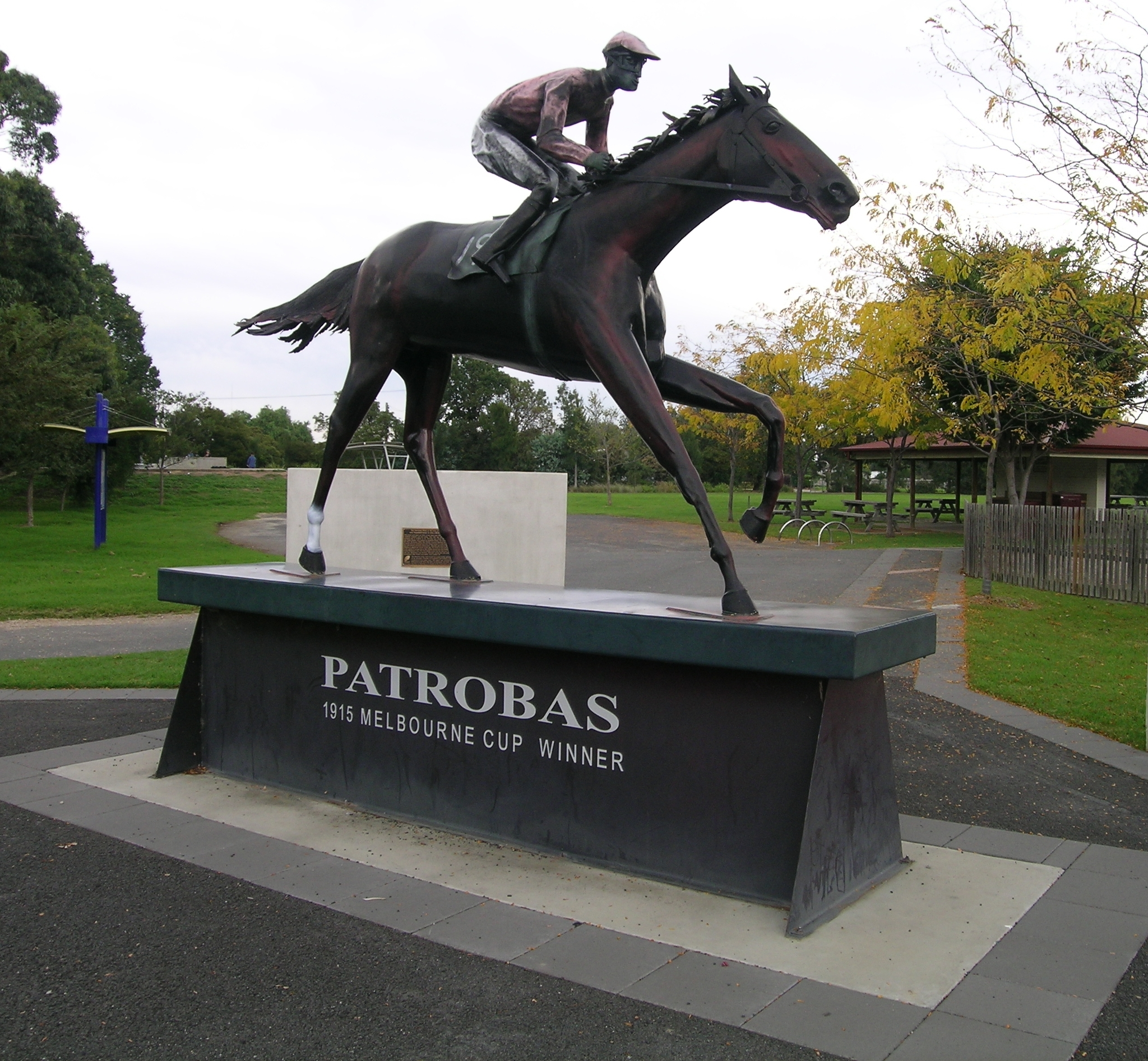
- Statue of the Melbourne Cup winner, Patrobas at Rosedale.

- Coordinates: 38.15°S 146.783°E
- Country: Australia
- State: Victoria
- LGA: Shire of Wellington
- Location: 188 km (117 mi) E of Melbourne; 30 km (19 mi) W of Sale; 15 km (9.3 mi) E of Traralgon

Government
  - State electorate: Gippsland South
  - Federal division: Gippsland
- Elevation: 20 m (66 ft)

Population
  - Total: 1,654 (2016 census)
- Postcode: 3847
- County: Buln Buln
- Mean max temp: 45 °C (113 °F)
- Mean min temp: −4 °C (25 °F)

Rosedale is a town 184 kilometres east of Melbourne via the Princes Highway. It is situated on the southern side of the LaTrobe River. Once a staging post on the Port Albert to Sale and Port Albert to Walhalla coach runs, it was the administrative centre of the Shire of Rosedale which extended to the east and included the Ninety Mile Beach. It is now part of the Wellington Shire centred in Sale. At the 2006 census, Rosedale had a population of 1,077. The town is in the area of Gippsland explored separately by the Scotsman, Angus McMillan, and the Polish aristocrat, Count Paul von Strzelecki, in 1840. A memorial to McMillan is located in Rosedale, and one to Strzelecki near Traralgon to the west. Strzelecki named the region Gippsland after Governor Gipps.

== History ==
The earliest European inhabitant in the district is thought to have been a man named Blind Joe who lived in a hut on the Latrobe River and the first sale of 'town lots' in Rosedale, on 20 May 1855, took place there. The town is named after and built near the site of a station owned by David Parry-Okedon, who, in 1843, called his run Rosedale after his wife, Rosalie. The earliest known plan of the township is dated 27 March 1855. It comprised 14 blocks and remains the central layout of the township.

The first brick construction was the Rosedale Hotel in 1858, built by William Allen, who emigrated from London in 1854. He was also responsible for the construction of the Mechanic's Institute, the original school house, the Exchange Hotel, the three churches and Nambrok Homestead. The Rosedale Post Office opened on 8 February 1859. A Police Station followed in 1862.

The first bridge over the LaTrobe River was constructed in 1862. Following disastrous floods in 1934 and 1935, two raised concrete bridges, joined by a central causeway, were constructed over the flood plain in 1937–38. This structure was duplicated as part of the subsequent upgrade of the Princes Highway. The first school was opened in 1863 and became a Common School in 1865 (later State School Number 770). During the school centenary year, Dr H.C Disher, of 'Strathfieldsaye', who was born at Rosedale and attended the school from 1901 to 1904, established an annual secondary scholarship for a deserving boy and girl. The school was moved to a new location on the western side of the town 1989. St Mark's Anglican Church was built in 1866, followed by St Andrew's Presbyterian Church in 1869. St Rose of Lima Catholic Church was constructed in 1875. In 1866, a site was selected for a Mechanic's Institute. The building was opened in 1875.

Rosedale was proclaimed a Road District in February 1869. Two years later, it became the Rosedale Shire Council. It had four areas – Rosedale, Toongabbie, Denison and Traralgon. In 1879, Traralgon became a separate shire.

The Rosedale Railway Station was opened on 1 June 1877, as part of the Morwell to Sale line. It was not until 1879 that the remaining sections from Melbourne to Sale were all completed.

The area was once part of the Holey Plain grazing run, owned by the Curlewis brothers. Edward Crooke, who emigrated to Australia in 1837 and purchased a station at Omeo in the early 1840s, used the run as a holding station for the livestock which he drove to Port Albert for shipment to Van Diemen's Land. He later leased the property and his son built an impressive homestead with a four-tiered tower on the site in 1889. Crooke's descendants still live in the district. Other notable homesteads are Snake's Ridge (now known as The Ridge) on the northern bank of the LaTrobe River, and Nambrok about eight kilometres to the east along the Princes Highway.

A pyneboard factory was opened in 1964 by the Premier of Victoria, Mr Henry Bolte. It operated for some 15 years. The plant was used subsequently as a leather tanning works.

The Rosedale Magistrates' Court closed on 1 July 1981, not having been visited by a Magistrate since 1972.

== Sport ==
The town has a football club in the North Gippsland Football Netball League, previously the North Gippsland Football League. The Club won the Firsts Premiership in 1965, 2001 and 2015. The club previously played the Sale Cowwarr Football League, where the Firsts were Premiers in 1958, 1961 and 1962. The Rosedale Recreation Reserve comprises two ovals and two netball courts. It is the home of the Rosedale Football Club, the Rosedale Netball Club, the Rosedale Kilmany Cricket Club, the Rosedale Junior Football Club and the Rosedale Badminton Club.

The town also has a bowls club, a golf club, a tennis club and a rifle range.

Thoroughbred horse racing was conducted at Rosedale for over a century, with the first-known event held on 13 April 1868. A Rosedale Turf Club was established in 1878. It became the Rosedale Racing Club, which conducted races until 1969. Patrobas, the three-year-old winner of the 1915 Caulfield Guineas, Victoria Derby and Melbourne Cup finished second in his first race at Rosedale. Patrobus was raced by Miss Widdis, the owner of the nearby Nambrok station. She was the first woman to own a Melbourne Cup winner. Patrobus is the only Gippsland horse to win the Melbourne Cup. A statue of the horse is located in the main street.

Following the closure of the Rosedale Racing Club, the racecourse was developed as a golf course and a speedway. The first speedway meeting was conducted in 1972. In February 1973, the speedway attracted some of the best drivers throughout Australia to the inaugural Coca-Cola Bottlers 2000 meeting. The race was won by the reigning Australian champion, David House, from Canberra, driving a Torana GTR XU1. The course broadcaster for the first decade was Kevin Andrews, who then worked as a sports commentator and reporter. The Rosedale Speedway has twice hosted Australian Championships. In 1980, Queensland driver, Arthur Wieden, won the first of four national Standard Sedan titles. In 2002–03, Stephen Laidlaw successfully defended his Australian Production Sedan title.

== Notable people ==
=== Sport ===
- Neil Cordy, Graeme Cordy and Brian Cordy – Australian Rules Football players with Footscray Football a Club (now the Western Bulldogs) who attended the Rosedale Primary School.
- Geoff Raines – Australian Rules Football player with Richmond Football Club who lived in Rosedale as a teenager.
- Keith Rowley, winner of the inaugural Herald Sun Tour, was born at Rosedale.

=== Politics ===
- Kevin Andrews – Cabinet Minister in the Howard and Abbott governments, formerly 'Father of the House of The Australian Parliament' – attended Rosedale Primary School.
- Edward Jolley Crooke, owner of 'The Holey Plain', represented the district in the Legislative Council of Victoria for 30 years (1893–1922) and was a Rosedale Shire councillor for 46 years.

== Gallery ==
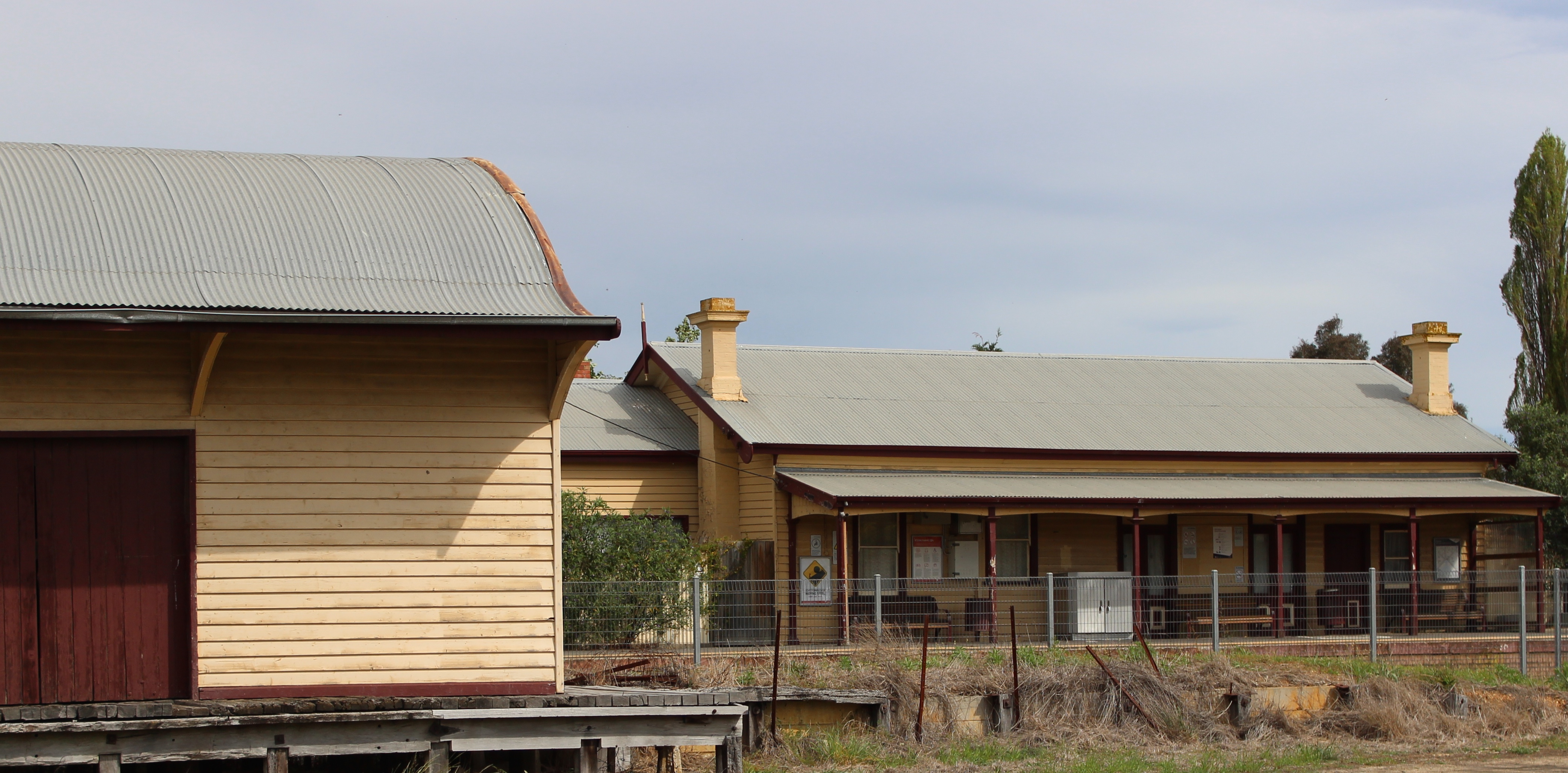
Rosedale Railway Station

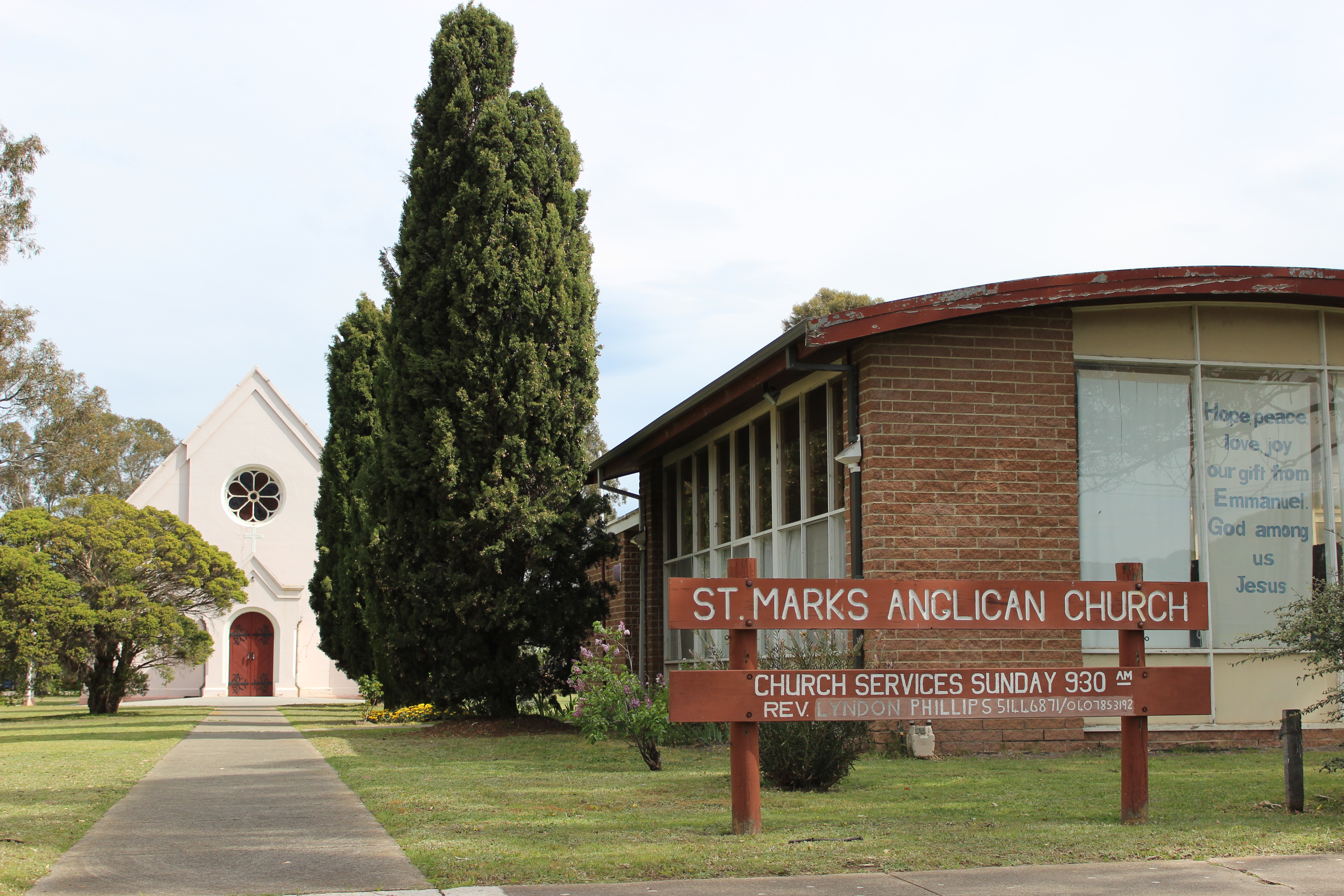
St Mark's Anglican Church (1866) Rosedale

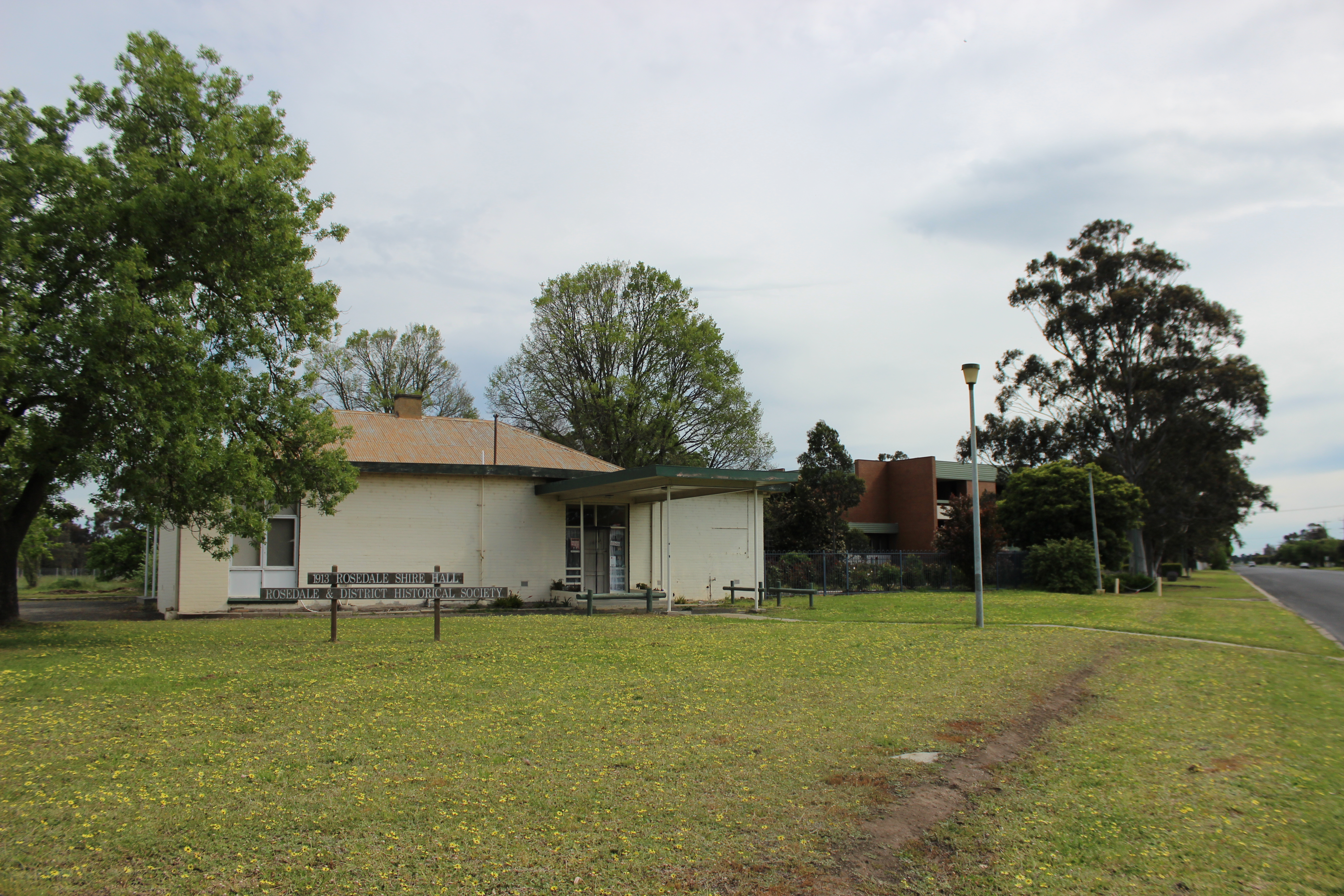
Shire of Rosedale Offices – 1913 (foreground) and subsequently (background)

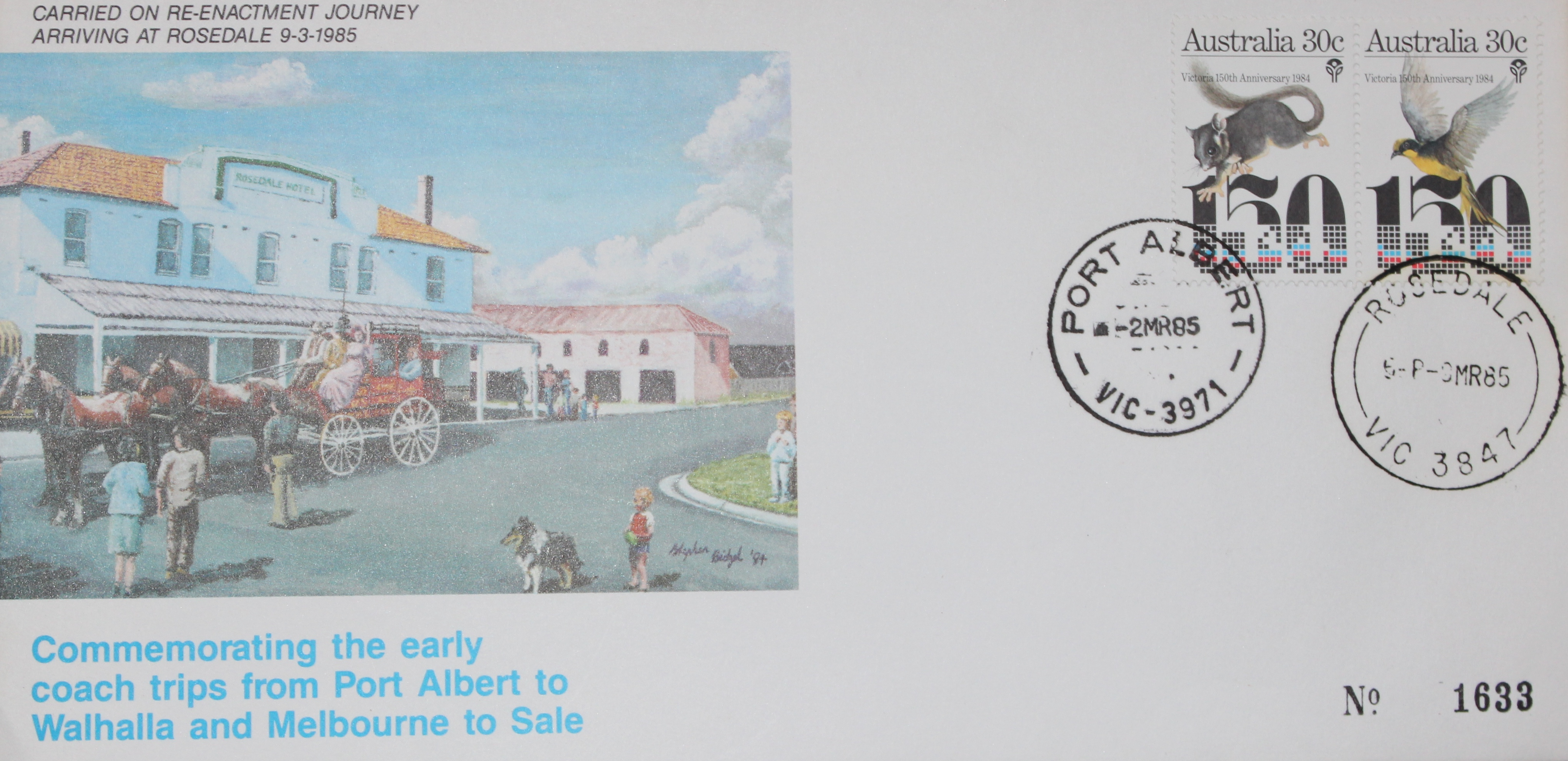
Envelope marking 150th anniversary of Port Albert to Rosedale coach service

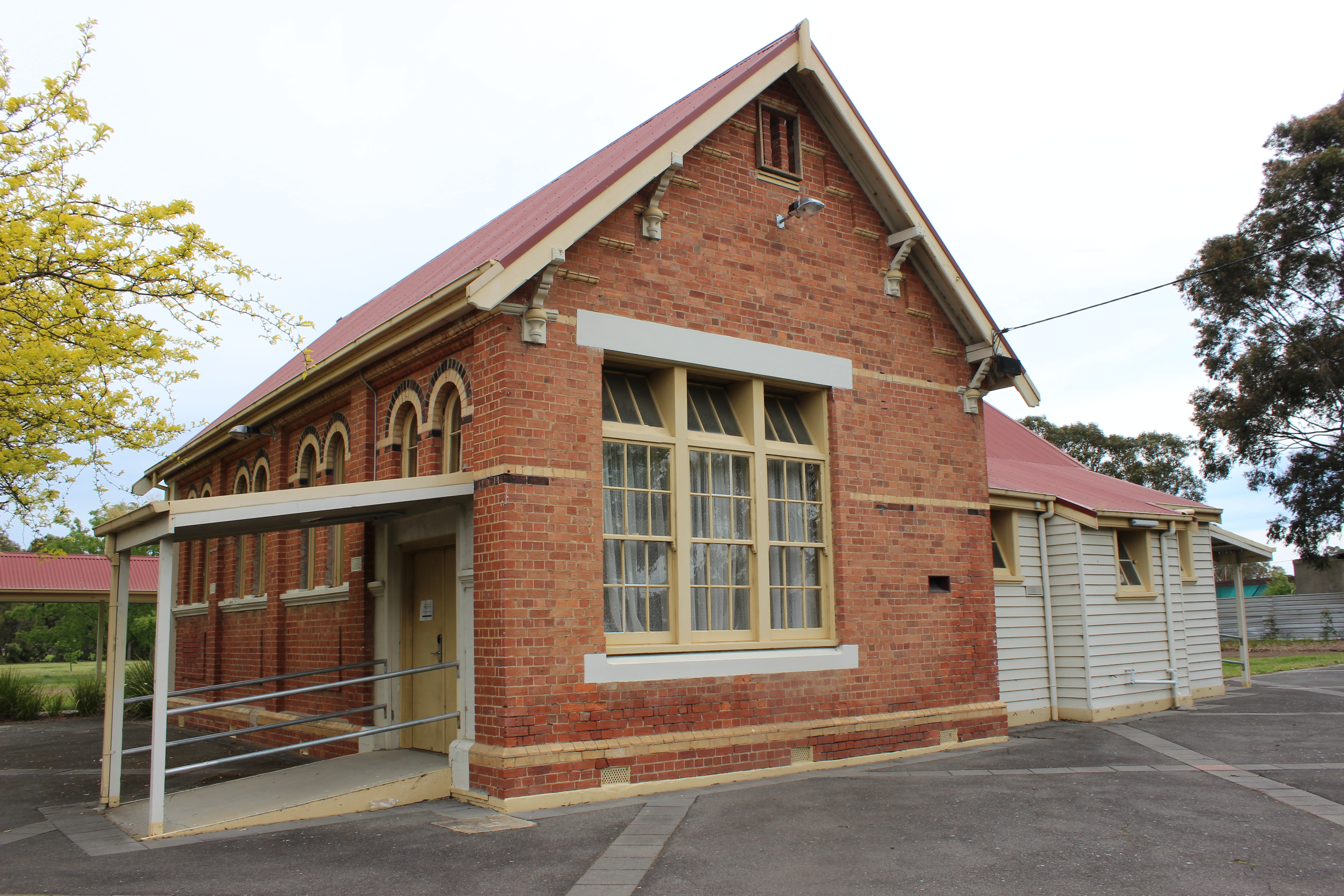
Original Rosedale Primary School – No. 770 (1865)

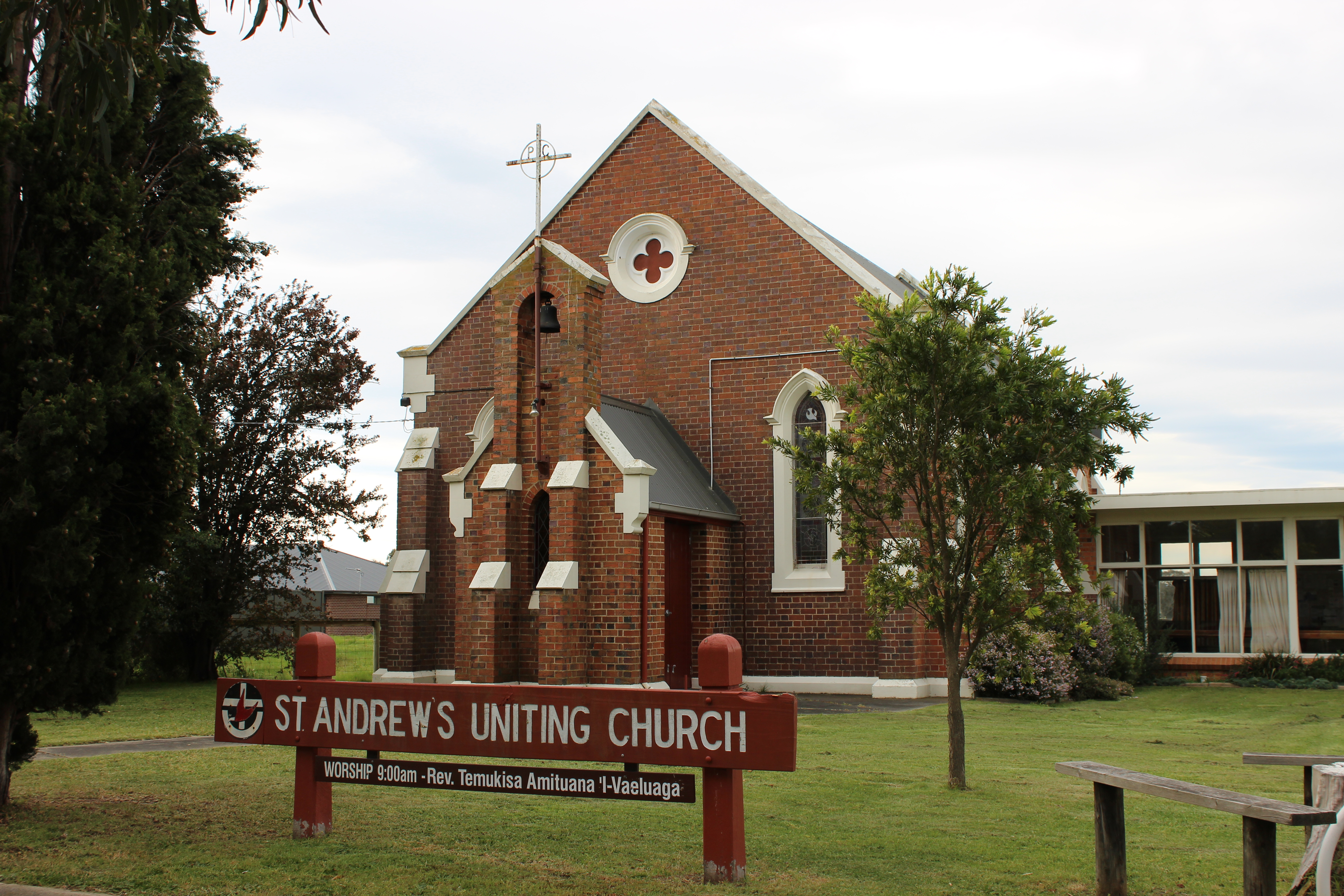
St Andrew's Presbyterian Church (1869) Rosedale

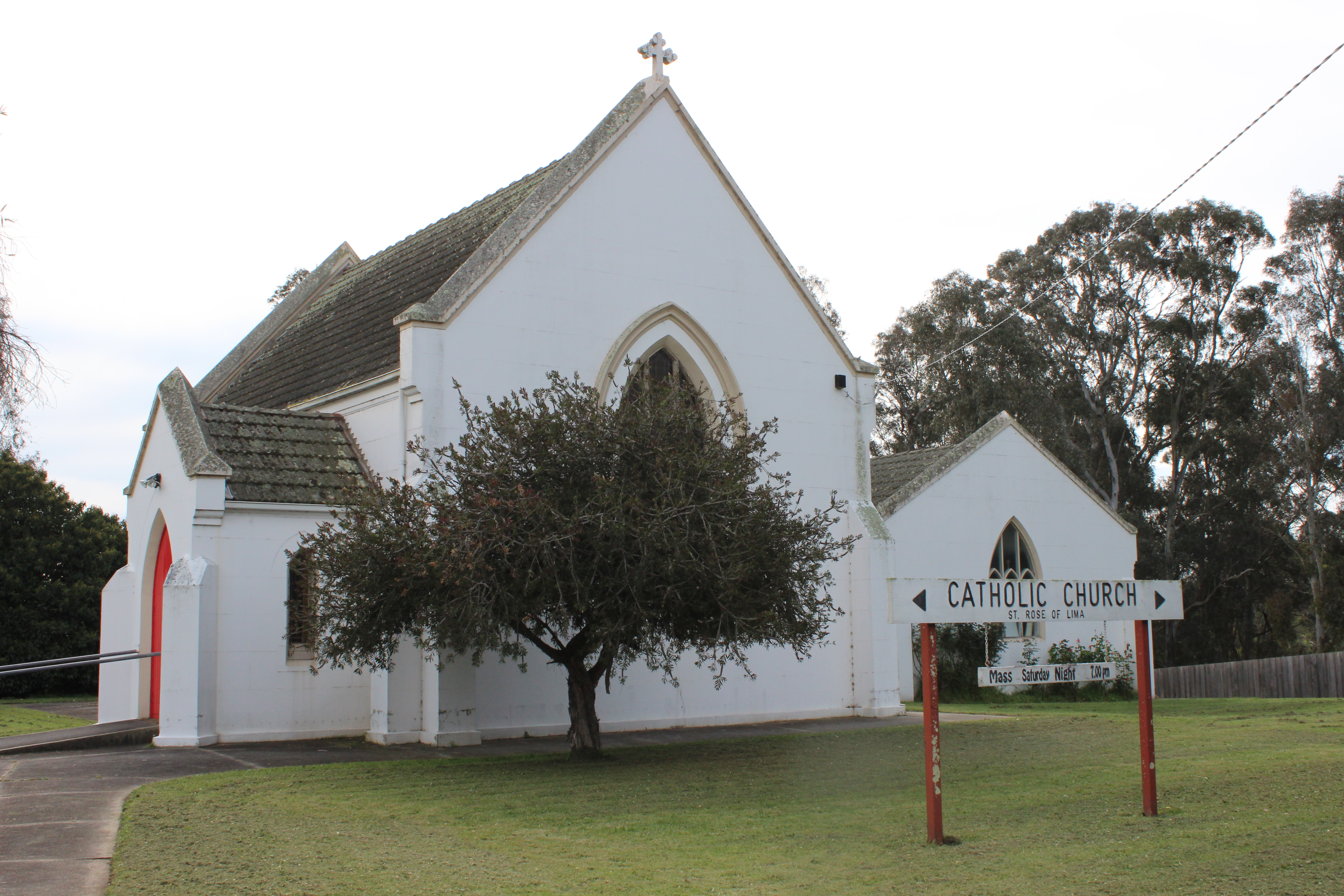
St Rose of Lima Catholic Church (1875) Rosedale

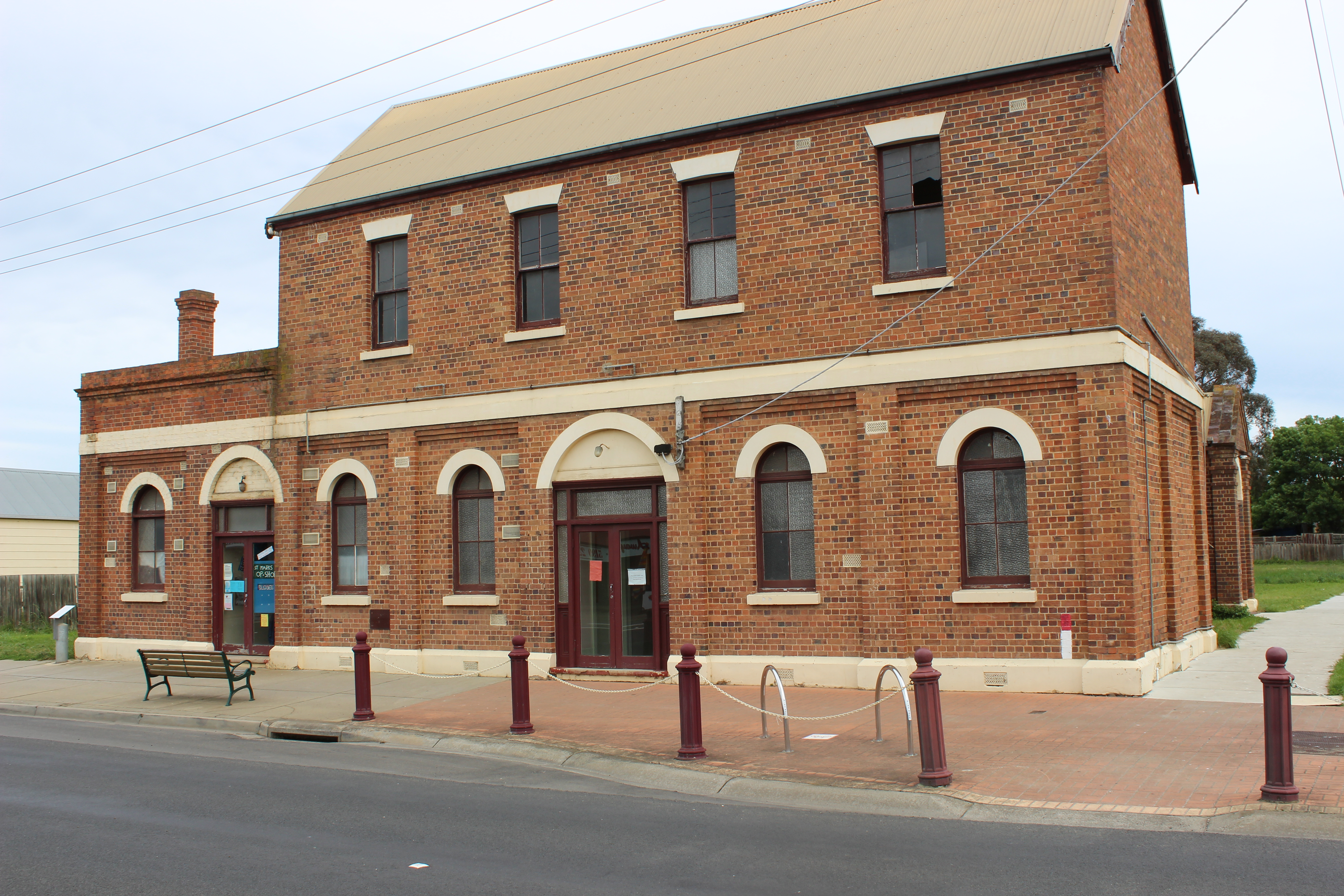
Mechanic's Institute, Rosedale (1875)

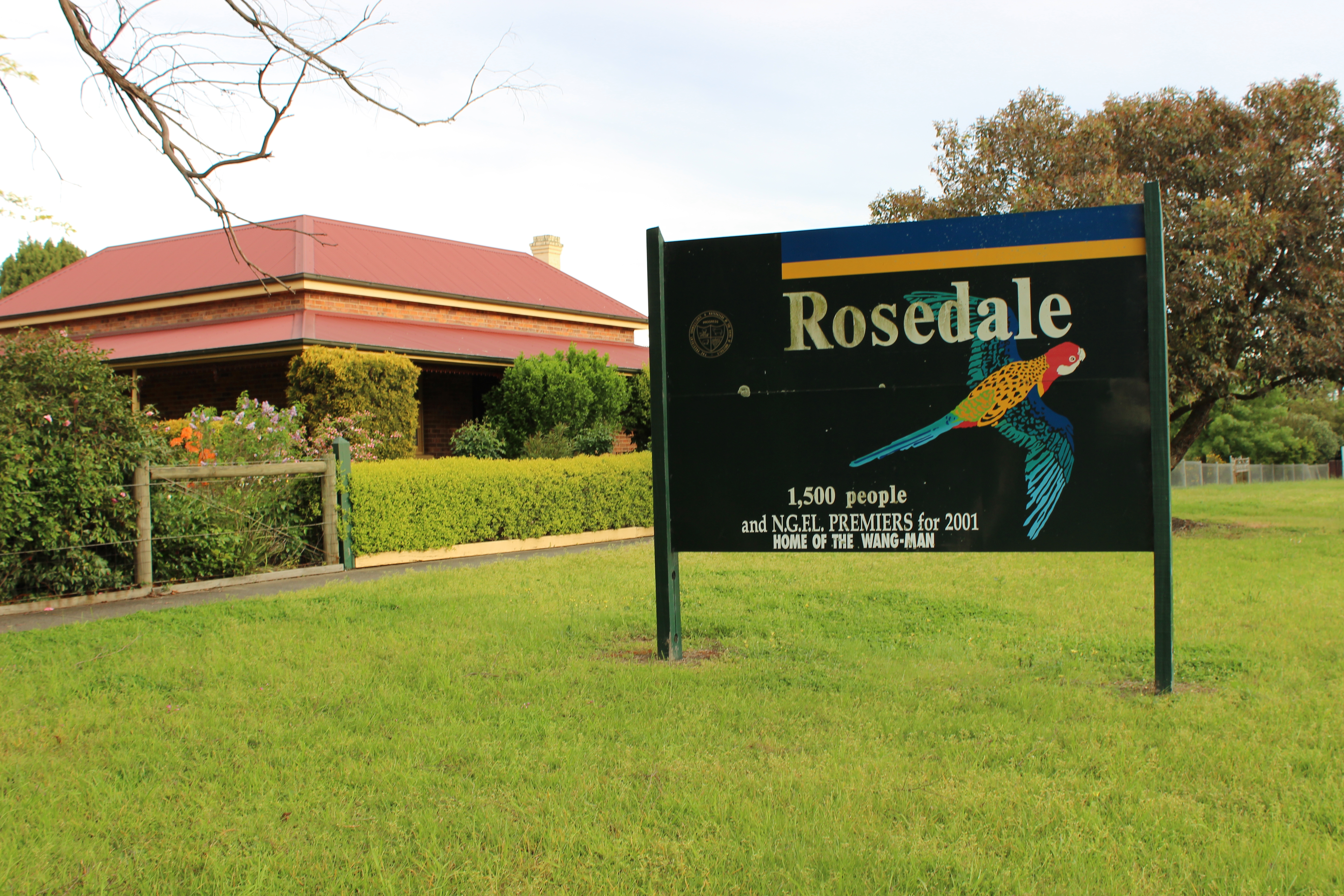
Welcome to Rosedale, Victoria

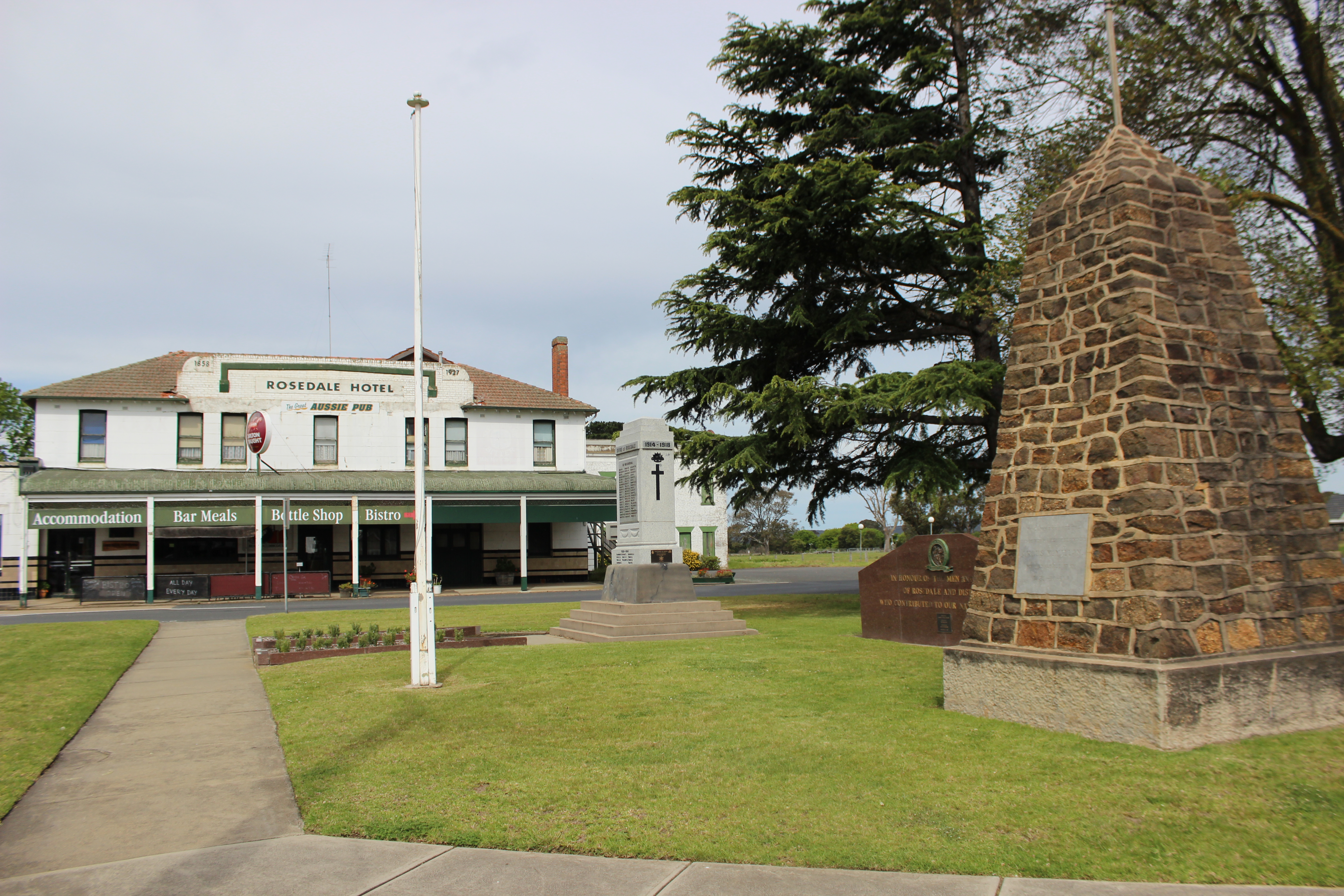
Rosedale Hotel (1858), War Memorial and Angus McMillan cairn
