= Ray Harry =

Australian rules footballer

Personal information
- Full name: Raymond Wilbur Hodgson Harry
- Born: 11 August 1909; Bendigo, Victoria
- Died: 25 October 1991 (aged 82); Ararat, Victoria
- Original team: Traralgon (GFL)
- Height: 187 cm (6 ft 2 in)
- Weight: 79.5 kg (175 lb)
- Position: Midfielder

Playing career^{1}
Years	Club	Games (Goals)
1933	Carlton	1 (0)
- ^{1} Playing statistics correct to the end of 1933.

Raymond Wilbur Hodgson Harry (11 August 1909 – 25 October 1991) was an Australian rules footballer who played with Carlton in the Victorian Football League (VFL).
