= Ernie Abbott =

Australian rules footballer

Personal information
- Full name: Ernest Henry Abbott
- Born: 12 July 1883; South Melbourne, Victoria
- Died: 18 October 1960 (aged 77); Sale, Victoria
- Original teams: Traralgon, Port Melbourne

Playing career^{1}
Years	Club	Games (Goals)
1908	St Kilda	1 (1)
- ^{1} Playing statistics correct to the end of 1908.

Ernest Henry Abbott (12 July 1883 – 18 October 1960) was an Australian rules footballer who played with St Kilda in the Victorian Football League (VFL).

Abbott was originally from Traralgon in the West Gippsland Football Association.
