= Napoleon Cordy =

British Mesoamerican scholar

Hannibal Napoleon David Alfred Thomas ("Nap") Cordy (July 29, 1902 — January 30, 1977) was an amateur scholar in the field of pre-Columbian Mesoamerican civilizations, who made some notable contributions in the 1930s and 1940s to the early study and decipherment of the Maya script, used by the pre-Columbian Maya of southern Mexico and northern Central America.

== Life and accomplishments ==
Cordy was born in 1902 in Cheltenham, England. His family immigrated to the United States in 1913, settling in Globe, Arizona. The son of a coal and copper miner, Cordy briefly studied mining engineering at the University of Arizona. He moved to Los Angeles, California in 1922.

While working as an electrician at the Los Angeles Department of Water and Power from 1922–62, Cordy became fascinated with the Maya civilization, especially Maya hieroglyphs. He wrote a number of articles on the subject for various publications, and was a respected contributor to the journal The Masterkey, published by the Southwest Museum in Los Angeles. He was also a founding member of the Southwestern Anthropological Association. Cordy died in Los Angeles in 1977, aged 74.

His daughter, Alana Cordy-Collins, became an anthropologist/archaeologist, specializing in the Peruvian prehistory, especially the Chavin and Moche civilizations. She was a professor of anthropology at the University of San Diego. A cousin, Ross Cordy, is an anthropologist specializing in Polynesian civilizations. He was chief archaeologist for the state of Hawaii's Historic Preservation Division and teaches at the University of Hawaii.

== Publications ==
Cordy's publications include:

- "Meaning of Maya day-names". The Masterkey. 5 (5): 135–144. 1931.
- "Origin of the Tonalamatl". The Masterkey. 7: 80. 1933.
- "Cardinal point south in Maya language and glyph and its implications". Maya Research. 3: 326–329. 1936.
- "The Maya Year at the Inauguration of the Calendar, MS.740". Braun Research Library Collection, Autry National Center, Los Angeles. 1940.
- Cordy, N. (1946). "Examples of phonetic construction in Maya hieroglyphs". American Antiquity. 12 (2): 108–117. doi:10.2307/275343. ISSN 0002-7316. JSTOR 275343. S2CID 163534642.
- "Quetzal-Serpent and the Smoking Mirror," posthumously published novel, (ISBN 979-8-218-45882-9), 2024
