= Jack Roberts (footballer, born 1926) =

Australian rules footballer

Personal information
- Full name: John Douglas Roberts
- Born: 20 November 1926; Paynesville, Victoria
- Died: 19 December 1965 (aged 39); Lake Buloke, Victoria
- Original team: Traralgon
- Height: 183 cm (6 ft 0 in)
- Weight: 79 kg (174 lb)

Playing career^{1}
Years	Club	Games (Goals)
1947–50	Richmond	26 (0)
- ^{1} Playing statistics correct to the end of 1950.

John Douglas Roberts (20 November 1926 – 19 December 1965) was an Australian rules footballer who played with Richmond in the Victorian Football League (VFL).

Roberts struggled to gain a regular place in the Richmond senior side, but did win the Richmond Reserves’ Best and Fairest award in 1949. He subsequently coached country teams in Maffra, Rushworth and Donald.

He drowned at the age of 39 in Lake Buloke (just north of Donald) in December 1965.
