= Geoff Hocking =

Australian rules footballer

Personal information
- Full name: Geoff Hocking
- Born: 10 March 1959 (age 67)
- Original team: Mooroolbark
- Height: 193 cm (6 ft 4 in)
- Weight: 92 kg (203 lb)
- Position: Ruckman/defender

Playing career^{1}
Years	Club	Games (Goals)
1981	Carlton	6 (0)
- ^{1} Playing statistics correct to the end of 1981.

Geoff Hocking (born 10 March 1959) is a former Australian rules footballer who played with Carlton in the Victorian Football League (VFL). He later played for Claremont in the West Australian Football League (WAFL) and Box Hill in the Victorian Football Association (VFA). He coached Traralgon in the 1997 VFL season.
