= Fred Jones (Australian footballer) =

Australian rules footballer

Personal information
- Full name: Frederick George Jones
- Born: 22 April 1918; Traralgon, Victoria
- Died: 27 April 1977 (aged 59); Leongatha South, Victoria
- Original team: Traralgon
- Height: 189 cm (6 ft 2 in)
- Weight: 92 kg (203 lb)

Playing career^{1}
Years	Club	Games (Goals)
1941–1942	Hawthorn	13 (26)
- ^{1} Playing statistics correct to the end of 1942.

Frederick George Jones (22 April 1918 – 27 April 1977) was an Australian rules footballer who played with Hawthorn in the Victorian Football League (VFL).

Jones was recruited from the Traralgon Football Club where he was runner-up in the 1940 Gippsland Football League best and fairest award.
