= Zaine Cordy =

Australian rules footballer

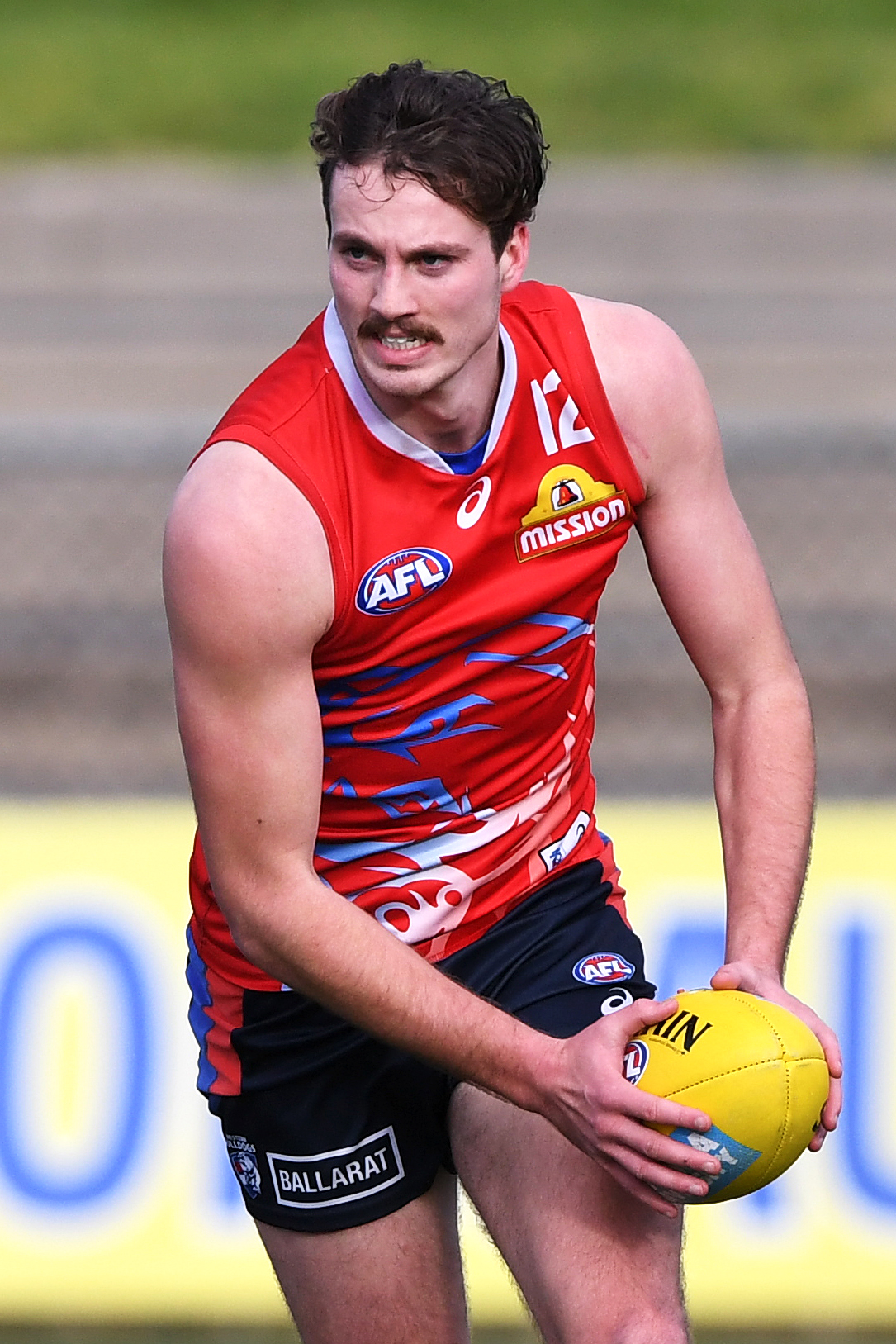
- Cordy in August 2018

Personal information
- Born: 27 October 1996 (age 30)
- Original teams: Geelong Falcons (TAC Cup), Geelong College (APS)
- Draft: No. 62 (F/S), 2014 national draft, Western Bulldogs
- Height: 195 cm (6 ft 5 in)
- Weight: 92 kg (203 lb)
- Position: Key defender

Playing career
Years	Club	Games (Goals)
2015–2022	Western Bulldogs	118 (12)
2023–2025	St Kilda	23 (9)
Total		141 (21)

Career highlights
- AFL premiership player: 2016

Zaine Cordy (born 27 October 1996) is a former professional Australian rules footballer who played for the Western Bulldogs and St Kilda in the Australian Football League (AFL). Cordy was drafted as a father–son pick by the Western Bulldogs with the 62nd draft pick in the 2014 AFL draft. He is the son of former Bulldogs player Brian Cordy, the brother of former Bulldogs player Ayce Cordy, and the nephew of sports reporter and former Sydney Swans and Western Bulldogs player Neil Cordy.

== Early football ==
Cordy played junior football for the Ocean Grove Cobras. He also played for the Geelong Falcons in the TAC Cup.

== AFL career ==
Cordy debuted in the Bulldogs' 23-point victory over the North Melbourne Football Club in the 22nd round of the 2015 AFL season. On debut, he picked up just one disposal but also collected two tackles. At the beginning of the 2016 season, Cordy signed on until 2018.

In 2016, Cordy moved positions, from key defender to centre half-forward and played nine games and kicked eight goals. After playing in every game since Round 19, he became part of the Bulldogs' 2016 premiership team. In the grand final, he kicked the opening goal and had 11 disposals. After 2016, he switched back to playing as a key defender.

In May 2018, Cordy signed a contract extension, keeping him at the Bulldogs until 2021.

Cordy moved to St Kilda as a free agent following the 2022 AFL season.

Cordy was delisted by the Saints at the conclusion of the 2025 season, after 23 games over 3 seasons.

== Later life ==
While he was playing professional football Cordy also completed a Bachelor of Business (Management & Innovation) degree. As of 2026, he works as a commercial analyst with the Australian finance company Podium Money.

== Statistics ==
Legend
G	Goals	K	Kicks	D	Disposals	T	Tackles
B	Behinds	H	Handballs	M	Marks
#	Played in that season's premiership team

Season	Team	No.	Games	Totals							Averages (per game)							Votes
Season	Team	No.	Games	G	B	K	H	D	M	T	G	B	K	H	D	M	T	Votes
2015	Western Bulldogs	12	2	0	0	2	6	8	2	4	0.0	0.0	1.0	3.0	4.0	1.0	2.0	0
2016	Western Bulldogs	12	9	8	1	51	32	83	25	22	0.9	0.1	5.7	3.6	9.2	2.8	2.4	0
2017	Western Bulldogs	12	19	0	0	149	92	241	82	49	0.0	0.0	7.8	4.8	12.7	4.3	2.6	0
2018	Western Bulldogs	12	18	2	1	142	72	214	73	35	0.1	0.1	7.9	4.0	11.9	4.1	1.9	0
2019	Western Bulldogs	12	23	0	1	129	95	224	72	40	0.0	0.0	5.6	4.1	9.7	3.1	1.7	0
2020 (Note: The 2020 season was played with 17 home-and-away matches per team (down from 22) and 16-minute quarters with time on (down from 20-minute quarters with time on) due to the impact of the COVID-19 pandemic.)	Western Bulldogs	12	14	0	0	86	32	118	40	20	0.0	0.0	6.1	2.3	8.4	2.9	1.4	0
2021	Western Bulldogs	12	19	0	0	126	57	183	67	38	0.0	0.0	6.6	3.0	9.6	3.5	2.0	0
2022	Western Bulldogs	12	14	2	0	60	49	109	33	29	0.1	0.0	4.3	3.5	7.8	2.4	2.1	0
2023	St Kilda	21	14	7	0	59	43	102	43	18	0.5	0.0	4.2	3.1	7.3	3.1	1.3	0
2024	St Kilda	21	8	1	0	36	29	65	24	14	0.1	0.0	4.5	3.6	8.1	3.0	1.8	0
2025	St Kilda	21	1	1	0	2	2	4	2	1	1.0	0.0	2.0	2.0	4.0	2.0	1.0	0
Career			141	21	3	842	509	1351	463	270	0.1	0.0	6.0	3.6	9.6	3.3	1.9	0

== Honours and achievements ==
- Team
  - AFL premiership: 2016
