= Bill Roberts (footballer, born 1897) =

Australian rules footballer

Personal information
- Full name: William Laurence Roberts
- Born: 9 May 1897; Broken Hill, New South Wales
- Died: 7 September 1960 (aged 63); Fitzroy, Victoria
- Original team: Traralgon / Trafalgar

Playing career^{1}
Years	Club	Games (Goals)
1923	South Melbourne	1 (1)
- ^{1} Playing statistics correct to the end of 1923.

William Laurence Roberts (9 May 1897 – 7 September 1960) was an Australian rules footballer who played with South Melbourne in the Victorian Football League (VFL).

Roberts played a single game for South Melbourne in Round 2 of the 1923 season against Fitzroy. During the game, one of the Fitzroy players recognised him as a man who, under the name “Williams” had been at Fitzroy two or three seasons previously. Investigations revealed he had been granted a permit to move from North Adelaide to Fitzroy using the name “W. Reidy”. Roberts claimed he had no knowledge of this 1921 permit but the League refused his request for a permit to move to Port Melbourne and his senior football career ended.

In early 1922, Roberts was arrested for stealing a £10 note, and subsequently sentenced to 12 months hard labour in Goulburn jail.
