= Cordy Mobilopter =

1930s American VTOL aircraft

Mobilopter
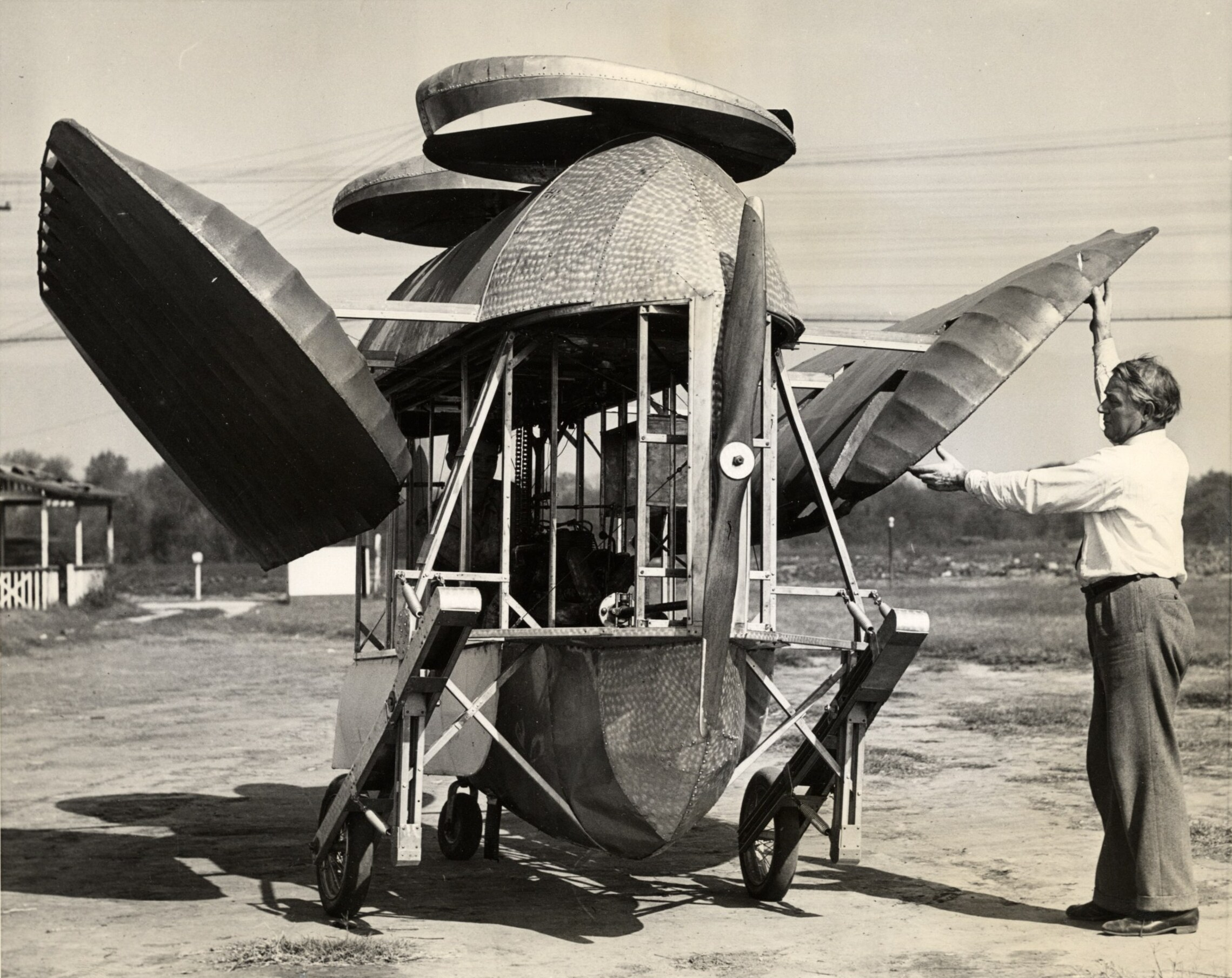
- Harry Cordy standing next to his Mobilopter, 1931

General information
- Type: VTOL aircraft
- Manufacturer: Harry Cordy
- Number built: 1

History
- Introduction date: 1931

The Mobilopter was a 1931 experimental aircraft designed and built by Harry Cordy of El Monte, California. On its only public showing, it had not flown.

== Design and development ==
Cordy was reported to have worked for 22 years on his vertical takeoff and landing aircraft concept. The craft featured a central fully enclosed fuselage of streamlined shape, with extensive glazing being incorporated into it. Above the fuselage were located two rotating discs, arranged in tandem. Each disc comprised two halves, were angled so as to generate lift when rotated. Two wings were arranged longitudinally along the length of the fuselage. The wings were hollow to allow airflow through them in order to generate additional lift. They could be tilted from being horizontal to vertical, dependent on the mode of flight.

The aircraft was fitted with a four-cylinder motorcycle engine, located in the center of the fuselage, and which powered the two discs and a tractor propeller. At the rear of the fuselage was a conventional tailplane with elevators, and a rudder. It was fitted with a wheeled undercarriage, with the front two wheels incorporating a leading link suspension of Cordy's own design. It included a self-contained parachute attachment in the fuselage.

Cordy believed the Mobilopter would be perfectly stable, and stay on "an even keel" at all times.

In 1931, Cordy was granted patent No. 1,818,116, for an "Aeroplane", embodying the principles behind the Mobilopter. He was also granted patent No. 1,818,143 in relation to the undercarriage suspension.

== Operational history ==
The Mobilopter was constructed at Monterey Park, California and debuted there in October 1931, with it being profiled in newspapers and magazines. Cordy was quoted as stating "No, it hasn't been off the ground yet." There are no reports of it having flown.
