= Michael Cordy =

British novelist

- Occupation: Novelist
- Notable work: The Messiah Code
- Website: michaelcordy.com

Michael Cordy is a British novelist. He was born in Sekondi-Takoradi in Ghana. Cordy spent much of his childhood in both West Africa and East Africa, India and Cyprus.

He was educated in the United Kingdom at The King's School, Canterbury, and the universities of Leicester and Durham.

After ten years in marketing and advertising, with his wife's encouragement, he became a novelist. His first novel, The Miracle Strain, took two years to complete and was published in 1997. Disney bought the film rights for $1.6 million and the novel reached no. 5 in The Sunday Times Bestseller list. An international success, it has since been published in more than twenty-five languages and over forty countries.

Another five novels followed: Crime Zero/The Crime Code, The Lucifer Code, The Venus Conspiracy, The Source and The Colour Of Death. All were published in the UK by Bantam Press and Corgi of Penguin Random House, and translated into several languages. Warner Bros optioned the film rights to The Source and the producers of Lord of The Rings and The Golden Compass optioned The Crime Code.

Michael Cordy's seventh and latest novel Manhattan Down was published in hardback in May 2025 to good reviews. The paperback is due in April 2026.

Reviews for Manhattan Down:

The Sunday Times - ‘Michael Cordy’s blend of heist, technology and geopolitical thriller is a riveting read’

Literary Review - ‘The plot is terrific, the writing punchy, the pace fast and the characters delightful. The twists add real piquancy to the tale.

Financial Times - ‘Cordy specialises in fast-paced, high-concept thrillers where the fate of multitudes, if not all humanity, is at stake.’

Express - ‘Manhattan Down is Cordy back at his brilliant best and ripe for another Hollywood buy up’

== Personal life ==
Michael Cordy lives in London with his wife Jenny and their daughter Phoebe. His latest novel Manhattan Down was published in May 2025 in Hardback by Penguin Random House. The paperback is out in April 2026. He is currently working on his eighth novel.

== Bibliography ==
Cordy is the author of seven novels:

- The Messiah Code, originally The Miracle Strain, published 1997. Doctor Tom Carter, inventor of a machine that can predict genetic defects, is contacted by a secret brotherhood to help them find the second coming of Jesus Christ to save his daughter.
- The Crime Code, originally Crime Zero, published 1999. In the near-future, a genetic project to identify the genes responsible for criminal behaviour lead into an attempt to eliminate crime by eliminating men.
- The Lucifer Code, originally Lucifer, published 2001. A religious group's attempts to witness the afterlife result in the leader declaring that the apocalypse is coming.
- The Venus Conspiracy, originally True, published 2004. A scientist's discovery of a drug that simulates love leads to a madman's attempt to turn himself into a figure of worship for the world.
- The Source, published August 2008, involves Abiogenesis. An adventure set mostly in Peru, Warner Bros. have bought an option on the film rights. A doctor's attempt to save his dying wife leads him to the discovery of a location that may be the inspiration for the Garden of Eden.
- The Colour of Death, published August 2011. The main character has an unprecedented form of synaesthesia, in which her five senses merge to form a sixth, and her hallucinations appear to be memories, but not her own.
- Manhattan Down, published May 2025. Described by the publisher as "A high concept international thriller which dares to take the world to the edge of oblivion."
