= Alana Cordy-Collins =

American academic (1944-2015)

- Born: June 5, 1944; Los Angeles, California
- Died: August 16, 2015 (aged 71); La Mesa, California
- Father: Napoleon Cordy
- Scientific career
- Education: University of California, Los Angeles
- Known for: Peruvian prehistory
- Fields: Archaeology

Alana Kathleen Cordy-Collins (5 June 1944 – 16 August 2015) was Professor of Anthropology at the University of San Diego. She was an archaeologist whose primary specialization was Peruvian prehistory.

== Biography ==
She was born in Los Angeles, California. Her father was Mayanist Napoleon Cordy.

She received her bachelor's degree, master's degree and Ph.D. at the University of California, Los Angeles (UCLA). She worked on the Ulluchu Project, a botanical research project on the north coast of Peru. A secondary specialization was shamanism, where she developed a project in Mongolia. In addition to her professorship, she was director of the David W. May Indian Artifacts Gallery and curator of the collection. She was also a former curator of the Latin American collections at the San Diego Museum of Man.

== Scientific career ==
Cordy-Collins played a major role in the excavation of several important Moche tombs in Peru starting in 1972, including the Royal Tombs of Sipán and Dos Cabezas. Sipán, excavated in 1987, is one of the most important archaeological discoveries of Peru. It includes some of the few tombs that had been undisturbed by grave robbers, and the artifacts, which included gold, ornate pottery and other findings, toured the United States. The excavation of the Dos Cabezas pyramid in 1997-2002 revealed treasure-filled tombs with a surprising amount of metalwork and ceramics, as well as a family of “giants” – mummies of men who would have stood about 6 feet tall, compared with the typical Moche, who averaged between 4-foot-10 and 5-foot-6. The noblemen suffered from Marfan syndrome, an inherited form of gigantism. These are the first recorded instances of gigantism in prehistoric South America. Cordy-Collins lectured both nationally and internationally about the Moche "giants."

== Published works ==
- "Proceedings of the 1995 and 1996 Latin American Symposia: Death, Ritual and the Afterlife," Alana Cordy-Collins and Grace Johnson, Presented by the San Diego Museum of Man Papers, 34, San Diego Museum of Man. 112 p., San Diego, Calif., 1997
- “An Unshaggy Dog Story: A Bizarre Canine is Living Evidence of Prehistoric Contact between Mexico and Peru,” Alana Cordy-Collins, Natural History 103(2):34-41, New York, NY, 1994.
- “Current Topics in Aztec Studies: Essays in Honor of Dr. H. B. Nicholson,” Alana Cordy-Collins and Douglas Sharon, San Diego Museum Papers, 30, San Diego Museum of Man. 118 p., San Diego, Calif., 1993
- The Northern Dynasties: Kinship and Statecraft in Chimor, Michael E. Moseley and Alana Cordy-Collins, A Symposium at Dumbarton Oaks, 12 and 13 October 1985, Dumbarton Oaks Research Library and Collection, Washington, D.C.
- The Cerro Sechin Massacre. Did It Happen? Ethnic Technology Notes No.18, Alana Cordy-Collins, San Diego Museum of Man, 1983
- Pre-Columbian Art from the Land Collection, L. K. Land, H.B. Nicholson & Alana Cordy-Collins, California Academy of Sciences & L. K. Land, 1979.
- Pre-Columbian Art History, Alana Cordy-Collins and Jean Stern, Peek Publications, 1977.
