= Noel Alford =

Australian rules footballer (1932–2022)

Personal information
- Full name: Noel Gordon Alford
- Born: 11 August 1932
- Died: 18 April 2022 (aged 89)
- Original team: University High
- Height: 170 cm (5 ft 7 in)
- Weight: 73 kg (161 lb)

Playing career^{1}
Years	Club	Games (Goals)
1952–1953	North Melbourne	24 (38)
- ^{1} Playing statistics correct to the end of 1953.

Noel Alford (11 August 1932 – 18 April 2022) was an Australian rules footballer who played with North Melbourne in the Victorian Football League (VFL).

Alford joined North Melbourne from University High and worked his way up from the thirds, where he won a Morrish Medal in 1950.

A rover, Alford played with North Melbourne for two seasons, in 1952 and 1953. He was third in their goal-kicking in each of those years.

In July, 1954 he was cleared to Williamstown where he played 12 games and kicked 20 goals, including the 1954 VFA premiership and then in 1955, he played with Traralgon in the Latrobe Valley Football League (LVFL) and in 1956 he was appointed their captain-coach.

He won the LaTrobe Valley FL best and fairest award in 1956 and also topped the league's goal-kicking that year with 61 goals.
