= Jim Silvestro =

Australian rules footballer

Personal information
- Full name: Jim Silvestro
- Born: 30 May 1963 (age 63)
- Original team: Traralgon
- Draft: No. 19, 1987 national draft
- Height: 173 cm (5 ft 8 in)
- Weight: 73 kg (161 lb)

Playing career^{1}
| Years | Club | Games (Goals) |
| 1988 | Sydney Swans | 8 (7) |
- ^{1} Playing statistics correct to the end of 1988.

Jim Silvestro (born 30 May 1963) is a former Australian rules footballer who played with the Sydney Swans in the Victorian Football League (VFL).

Silvestro won the Latrobe Valley Football League's best and fairest award back to back in 1986 and 1987, playing for Traralgon. A rover, he was selected by the Sydney Swans with pick 49 in the 1987 National Draft. He made eight appearances for the Swans in the 1988 VFL season. In round 12, he kicked four goals in a win over the West Coast Eagles at the Sydney Cricket Ground.

From 1991 to 1993, then again in 1998, Silvestro was coach of Corowa-Rutherglen in the Ovens & Murray Football League. He also coached the Wodonga Raiders, in 1996.
