= Jack Scott (Australian rules footballer) =

Australian rules footballer (1915–1997)

Personal information
- Full name: John Henry Scott
- Born: 27 October 1915; Morwell, Victoria
- Died: 19 July 1997 (aged 81); Traralgon, Victoria
- Original teams: Morwell, Traralgon
- Height: 188 cm (6 ft 2 in)
- Weight: 88.5 kg (195 lb)

Playing career^{1}
Years	Club	Games (Goals)
1939–1945	Richmond	86 (43)
- ^{1} Playing statistics correct to the end of 1945.

Career highlights
- Richmond Premiership Player 1943

John Henry Scott (27 October 1915 – 19 July 1997) was an Australian rules footballer who played in the VFL from 1939 to 1945 for the Richmond Football Club.

Scott won the 1938 Central Gippsland Football League’s Rodda Medal when playing for Traralgon, before heading down to Melbourne to play with Richmond.

Scott played in two consecutive VFL grand finals for the Tigers in 1942, going down to Essendon by 53 points, then in Richmond’s winning 1943 VFL grand final side, when they defeated the Bombers by 5 points.

He also played for Williamstown in the VFA in 1941 after playing three of the first four games of the VFL season with the Tigers, and was then 'loaned' back to Richmond in 1942 for the duration of the VFA's recess for the Second World War. Scott returned to Williamstown in 1945 and played in five of the first eight rounds before being swapped back to the VFL Tigers in exchange for champion rover and goalkicker, Dick Harris. Scott played a total of 15 games for the VFA Seagulls in 1941 and 1945 without kicking a goal.

Scott played in Hazelwood's 1951 and 46 year drought breaking Mid Gippsland Football League grand final victory, but as he only played two of the three required qualifying matches, the premiership was declared null and void.
