= Ross Cordy =

Ross H. Cordy was the branch chief of archaeology in the State of Hawaii's Historic Preservation Division, having headed that office and program for 16 years. He is currently the Humanities Division chair at the University of Hawaiʻi at West Oʻahu where he teaches courses on Hawaiian and Pacific Islands studies and archeology. Cordy is a volunteer archeology instructor for the Waianae High School - Hawaiian Studies Program, where he teaches hands-on archeology, history and historic preservation issues.

He has conducted research on Hawaiian archaeological and historical topics since 1968. He has done fieldwork throughout the Hawaiian Islands, on all the major Micronesian Islands, and in the Society Islands, and taught at universities in New Zealand. His writings include more than 80 published articles, books and monographs and numerous manuscript papers on a wide variety of Pacific subjects.

Cordy was raised in Davis, California, and completed a BA at University of California, Santa Barbara, MA at University of Michigan and PhD at University of Hawaiʻi at Mānoa.

== Some published works ==
- An Ancient History of Wai'anae, by Ross H. Cordy, Mutual Publishing, 2002.
- The Rise and Fall of the Oahu Kingdom, by Ross Cordy, Mutual Publishing, 2002.
- Exalted Sits the Chief: The Ancient History of Hawai'i Island, by Ross Cordy, Mutual Publishing, 2000
