= Ayce Cordy =

Australian rules footballer

Personal information
- Full name: Ayce Cordy
- Born: 6 August 1990 (age 36)
- Original team: Geelong Falcons (TAC Cup)
- Draft: No. 14 (F/S), 2008 National Draft
- Height: 204 cm (6 ft 8 in)
- Weight: 99 kg (218 lb)
- Position: Ruckman

Playing career^{1}
Years	Club	Games (Goals)
2009–2015	Western Bulldogs	27 (15)
- ^{1} Playing statistics correct to the end of 2015.

Ayce Cordy (born 6 August 1990) is an Australian rules footballer who played for the Western Bulldogs in the Australian Football League (AFL). The Bulldogs used their first-round selection, 14th overall, to secure Cordy after St Kilda bid their first-round selection (pick 13) for him. Cordy's father, Brian, played 124 games for the Bulldogs in the 1980s. His brother, Zaine, played in the Western Bulldogs' 2016 AFL premiership team.

Playing 27 games for the Western Bulldogs, Cordy was delisted at the end of the 2015 season.

Cordy crossed to Williamstown in the VFL after being delisted, although he had already played for Williamstown from 2009–13 while on the Western Bulldogs list as part of the alignment between the two clubs. He played for Williamstown in 2016–2017 before transferring to Melbourne University in 2018. Cordy played a total of 75 games and kicked 81 goals for Williamstown.

As of 2026, Cordy works as Head of Vegetation Management for Powercor Australia.
