= Brian Cordy =

Australian rules footballer

Personal information
- Full name: Brian Cordy
- Born: 14 January 1961 (age 65)
- Original team: Traralgon (LVFL)
- Height: 183 cm (6 ft 0 in)
- Weight: 80 kg (176 lb)

Playing career^{1}
Years	Club	Games (Goals)
1981–1988	Footscray	124 (18)
1989	West Adelaide	23 (23)
Total		147 (41)
- ^{1} Playing statistics correct to the end of 1989.

Brian Cordy (born 14 January 1961) is a former Australian rules footballer who played in the Victorian Football League (VFL) between 1981 and 1988 for the Footscray Football Club.

Recruited from La Trobe Valley Football League (LVFL) club Traralgon, Cordy played 124 games and kicked 18 goals, including all 25 games in 1985, one of Footscray's more successful seasons. He played his final game in 1988 against Hawthorn in Round 14.

Cordy transferred to South Australian National Football League (SANFL) club West Adelaide in 1989.

His older brother Neil and younger brother Graeme played alongside Brian for Footscray. His sons Ayce and Zaine were drafted in 2008 and 2014, respectively, by the Bulldogs under the father–son rule.
