= Neil Cordy =

Australian rules footballer

Personal information
- Born: 8 April 1959 (age 67)
- Original team: Traralgon

Playing career
Years	Club	Games (Goals)
1979–1986	Footscray	139 (28)
1987–1993	Sydney Swans	96 (4)
Total		235 (32)

Neil Cordy (born 8 April 1959) is a former Australian rules footballer and now television presenter.

== Football career ==
Cordy was recruited from Traralgon, Victoria. He made his AFL debut with the Footscray Football Club in 1979, and went on to play 139 games and kick 28 goals with the club until 1986, mainly playing as a winger. He moved to the Sydney Swans in 1987, playing more of a defensive role, going on to play 96 games and kick 4 goals until 1993, when he retired.

== Media career ==
In 1996, Cordy became a sports reporter for Network Ten in Melbourne, and appeared in the documentary Year of the Dogs in this capacity. He has been a long-time contributor to the show Sports Tonight and the nightly sports reports on the news. He has also been a boundary rider during AFL matches for Ten, mostly in Sydney or for big games involving the Sydney Swans, such as the 2005 and 2006 Grand Finals.

He has appeared on Ten's Morning News to preview the weekend in NRL and AFL. He has also filled in as presenter of Sports Tonight, when either Brad McEwan or Rob Canning were unavailable.

Cordy is now the head AFL reporter for Sydney's The Daily Telegraph.

== Personal life ==
Cordy is the brother of fellow Australian rules footballers Graeme and Brian. His nephews Ayce Cordy and Zaine Cordy were selected under the father–son rule as sons of Brian and played for the Western Bulldogs. Ayce was delisted at the conclusion of the 2015 season, while Zaine was a member of the Western Bulldogs' 2016 Premiership team.
