= Graeme Cordy =

Australian rules footballer

Personal information
- Full name: Graeme Cordy
- Born: 23 October 1962 (age 64)
- Original team: Traralgon
- Height: 189 cm (6 ft 2 in)
- Weight: 80 kg (176 lb)

Playing career^{1}
Years	Club	Games (Goals)
1985–1986	Footscray	6 (3)
1987–1989	Sydney Swans	21 (6)
Total		27 (9)
- ^{1} Playing statistics correct to the end of 1989.

Graeme Cordy (born 23 October 1962) is a former Australian rules footballer who played with Footscray and the Sydney Swans in the Victorian Football League (VFL).

Like his two older brothers, Brian and Neil, Cordy started his career at Footscray. The Traralgon recruit would however only manage six appearances for the club, before moving to Sydney in 1987, with his brother Neil. A key forward, he played 10 games for Sydney in each of his first two seasons, but struggled with injuries. He joined the Wodonga Football Club after leaving Sydney.
