= Peter Paterson =

Peter Paterson may refer to:

- Peter Paterson (footballer, born 1880) (1880–?), Scottish footballer for Everton and Grimsby Town
- Peter Paterson (footballer, born 1916) (1916–1968), Australian rules footballer for Essendon
- Peter Paterson (artist), see The Rebel Angels
- Peter Paterson (journalist), see The Second Coming

== See also ==
- Peter Patterson (disambiguation)
