= Moe Football Club =

Australian Rules Football and Netball Club

Moe

Names
- Full name: Moe Football Netball Club
- Nickname: Lions

2024 season
- Best and fairest: Riley Baldi

Club details
- Founded: 1909; 117 years ago
- Colours
- Competition: Gippsland FL
- President: Mat Howlett
- Coach: Declan Keilty
- Captain: Jacob Wood
- Premierships: (7) 1912, 1927, 1941, 1945, 1956, 1967, 2026. Most Recent All Grades:2026 Gippsland League Seniors
- Ground: Ted Summerton Reserve, Moe

Uniforms
Home

Other information
- Official website: https://www.moefootballnetballclub.com/

The Moe Football Netball Club, nicknamed the Lions, is an Australian rules football and netball club based at Ted Summerton Reserve in the town of Moe, Victoria. The club teams currently compete in the Gippsland Football League.

== Club history ==
There was a meeting at Semmen's Moe Hotel in April, 1889 to form a local football club, with Mr. A A McPhee elected as president, R J Martin - Secretary and C W J Coleman as Treasurer. Mr. C W J Coleman was elected as club captain as Mr. J Watson was appointed as vice captain for 1889.

Moe played in the Miller Cup in 1889 and the Kennedy Cup competition in 1890.

Moe Football Club was re-established in 1900, at a meeting Leith's Club Hotel, with Captain Leith elected as president. Captain Leith was president in 1901 too and played in the West Gippsland Football Association in 1901.

In 1908, Moe wore the colours of red, white and blue.

Moe FC entered the Central Gippsland FA in 1909, which was the major league in Gippsland at the time.

In 1910, Moe wore the colours of "blue knickers, blue guernsey with sash and red stockings"

At the club's 1911 AGM Mr. H Smith's offer to coach the football club was accepted with Cr. W Beck - President, A Simmons - Secretary and B Gibson - Treasurer.

Mr. P McCarthy, Moe footballer collided with a Warragul player on Wednesday, 7 June 1911 and was taken to the Warragul Hospital. McCarthy required surgery on the Friday, and later died on Sunday morning.

Moe won the Narracan Shire Football Association premiership in 1912.

At the club's 1914 AGM, the club adopted the colors of maroon guernsey and stockings and white knickers.

In 1927 the club decided to play in the Erica District Football Association. They were too strong for the other clubs and won the premiership. Moe were behind in the dying seconds of the grand final against Baw Baw when J Walsh marked and kicked the winning goal to win the flag for Moe by three points.

Back in the Central Gippsland FA from 1928, they remained in the league until it was replaced by the Latrobe Valley Football League in 1954.

Moe won the 1941 Yallourn & District Football Association premiership.

In 1944 and 1945 Moe played in the Central Gippsland Wartime Football League, won by Yallourn in 1944, then Moe won the 1945 premiership defeating Yallourn.

Club coach, Don Keyter polled the most votes (23) in the 1963 LVFL best and fairest - Trood Award / Rodda Medal count, but was ineligible due to a suspension he incurred during the season. Ironically the award was won by Moe player, Alan Steel with 18 votes.

The club had senior football Premiership success the Latrobe Valley FL in 1956 and 1967.

== Football Competition Timeline ==
- 1889 - Miller Challenge Cup
- 1890 - Kennedy Challenge Cup
- 1891 to 1897 - ?
- 1898 & 1899 - Hall's Challenge Cup
- 1901 to 1908? - West Gippsland Football Association
- 1909 to 1911 - Central Gippsland Football Association
- 1912 & 1913? - Narracan Shire Football Association
- 1914 & 1915? - Morwell District Football Association
- 1916 to 1918 - CGFA in recess due to WWI
- 1919 to 1926 - Central Gippsland Football Association
- 1927 - Erica & District Football Association
- 1928 to 1940 - Central Gippsland Football Association
- 1941 - Yallourn & District Football Association
- 1942 & 1943 - Club in recess due to WW2
- 1944 & 1945 - Central Gippsland Wartime Football Association
- 1946 to 1953 - Central Gippsland Football League
- 1954 to 2001 - Latrobe Valley Football League
- 2002 to 2009 - West Gippsland Latrobe Football League
- 2010 to Present - Gippsland Football League

== Football Premierships ==
Seniors

- Narracan Shire Football Association
  - 1912 - Moe: 6.5 - 41 defeated Yarragon: 2.4 - 16
- Erica District Football Association
  - 1927 - Moe: 8.9 - 57 defeated Baw Baw: 8.6 - 54
- Yallourn & District Football Association
  - 1941 - Moe: 8.12 - 60 defeated Yallourn Powerhouse: 5.10 - 40
- Central Gippsland Wartime Football League
  - 1945 - Moe: 6.12 - 48 defeated Yallourn: 4.10 - 34
- Latrobe Valley Football League
  - 1956 - Moe: 10.9 - 69 defeated Traralgon: 8.13 - 61
  - 1967 - Moe: defeated Bairnsdale: by six points
- Gippsand League
  - 2026 - Moe: 14.7 - 91 defeated Leongatha:11.17 - 83

Reserves

- LaTrobe Valley Football League
  - 1959, 1967, 1968

Thirds / Under 18's

- LaTrobe Valley Football League
  - 1959, 1991

Fourths / Under 16's

- Gippsland Football League
  - 2014, 2016, 2017

== Netball Premierships ==
A Grade

- Gippsland Football League
  - 2018, 2023, 2024

B Grade

- Gippsland Football League
  - 2017,2019

Under 17s

- Gippsland Football League
  - 2014, 2015, 2016

== Football League Best & Fairest Awards ==
Seniors

- Central Gippsland Football Association: Rodda Medal
  - 1936 - Ivan Williams
  - 1939 - A "Bert" Tabuteau
- Latrobe Valley Football League: Trood Award / Rodda Medal
  - 1958 - Lester Ross
  - 1963 - Alan Steel. Don Keyter, from Moe FC polled 23 votes, but was ineligible
  - 1973 - Barry Rowlings
  - 1974 - Barry Rowlings
  - 1988 - Lachlan Sim
  - 2000 - Jason Shields
- Gippsland Football League
  - 2017 - James Blazer

Reserves Hartley Medal

- Gippsland Football League
  - 2018 - James Heslop https://gippslandleague.com.au/football-awards/

Fourths Shaw Carter Medal

- Gippsland Football League
  - 2023 - Thomas Matthews https://gippslandleague.com.au/football-awards/

== Netball League Best and Fairest Awards ==
A Grade

- Gippsland League Hutchinson Medal
  - 1991 - Sarah Ryan https://gippslandleague.com.au/netball-awards/
  - 2016 - Montanna Holmes https://gippslandleague.com.au/netball-awards/

B Grade

- Gippsland League - Dawn Pearce Medal
  - 2013 - Saskia Heathcote https://gippslandleague.com.au/netball-awards/
  - 2014 - Lisa Shields https://gippslandleague.com.au/netball-awards/
  - 2018 - Carly Mullen - Bianconi https://gippslandleague.com.au/netball-awards/

C Grade

- Gippsland League - Karen Proctor Medal
  - 2023 - Elly Brown https://gippslandleague.com.au/netball-awards/

Under 17s

- Gippsland Football League
  - 2013 - Jayde Travers https://gippslandleague.com.au/netball-awards/
  - 2014 - Jayde Travers https://gippslandleague.com.au/netball-awards/

Under 15s

- Gippsland Football League
  - 2006 - Hayley Brown https://gippslandleague.com.au/netball-awards/

Under 13s

- Gippsland Football League
  - 2016 - Madelaine Galea https://gippslandleague.com.au/netball-awards/
  - 2023 - Virginia Daley https://gippslandleague.com.au/netball-awards/

== VFL/ AFL players ==
The following footballers played with Moe prior to making their VFL / AFL debut.

- 1925 - Peter Reville - South Melbourne, Fitzroy
- 1933 - Charlie Richards - Footscray
- 1935 - Ken Feltscheer - Melbourne, Hawthorn
- 1949 - Laurie Shipp - North Melbourne
- 1951 - Alby Law - Essendon
- 1959 - Lester Ross - St. Kilda
- 1960 - John Somerville - Essendon
- 1962 - George Savige - Footscray
- 1968 - Ted Hopkins - Carlton
- 1975 - Barry Rowlings - Hawthorn, Richmond
- 1988 - Peter Somerville- Essendon
- 1989 - Lachlan Sim - Brisbane Bears
- 2000 - Troy Makepeace - North Melbourne
- 2016 - Sam Skinner - Brisbane
- 2018 - Declan Keilty - Melbourne

The following footballers played senior VFL / AFL football prior to playing with Moe. The year indicates their first season with Moe.

- 1955 - Jervis Stokes - Richmond
- 1963 - Kevin Northcote - Hawthorn
- 2019 - Bernie Vince - Adelaide, Melbourne
