= Bruce Carruthers =

Bruce Carruthers may refer to:

- Wallace Bruce Matthews Carruthers (1863–1910), Canadian soldier and founder of the Canadian Signalling Corps
- Bruce Carruthers (footballer) (1903–1988), Australian rules footballer
- Bruce Maitland Carruthers (1892–1951), Australian physician and surgeon
