= Peter Patterson =

Peter Patterson may refer to:

- Peter Patterson (politician) (1825–1904), Ontario businessman and political figure
- Peter Paterson (footballer, born 1916) (1916–1968), former Australian rules footballer who played for Essendon
- Peter Patterson (footballer, born 1945), former Australian rules footballer who played for Collingwood
- Peter Patterson (businessman) (1768–1851), English-born businessman and seigneur in Quebec
- Pete Patterson (born 1957), American alpine ski racer

== See also ==
- Peter Paterson (disambiguation)
