= Clyde Smith (footballer) =

Australian rules footballer (1901–1935)

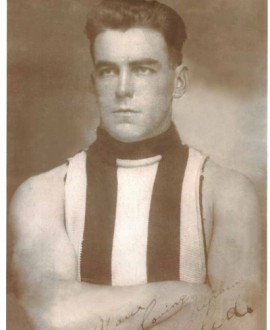
- Smith in 1922

Personal information
- Full name: Clyde James Smith
- Born: 28 January 1901
- Died: 5 January 1935 (aged 33); Frankston, Victoria
- Original team: Sturt
- Height: 174 cm (5 ft 9 in)
- Weight: 77 kg (170 lb)

Playing career^{1}
Years	Club	Games (Goals)
1921–1922	Collingwood	7 (0)
- ^{1} Playing statistics correct to the end of 1922.

Clyde James Smith (28 January 1901 – 5 January 1935) was an Australian rules footballer who played with Collingwood in the Victorian Football League (VFL).

Smith made one appearance for Collingwood in the 1921 VFL season and six in the 1922 VFL season, then left the club to coach Cobram.

Smith coached Rochester in 1924.

A police constable, Smith was accidentally shot and killed by a colleague's firearm while on duty in Frankston on 5 January 1935.
