= Bill Lever =

Australian rules footballer, born 1904

Personal information
- Full name: William George Hulme Lever
- Born: 20 April 1904; Prahran, Victoria
- Died: 25 September 1986 (aged 82)
- Original team: Rochester
- Height: 182 cm (6 ft 0 in)
- Weight: 80 kg (176 lb)

Playing career^{1}
Years	Club	Games (Goals)
1929–30	Carlton	14 (1)
- ^{1} Playing statistics correct to the end of 1930.

William George Hulme Lever (20 April 1904 – 25 September 1986) was an Australian rules footballer who played with Carlton in the Victorian Football League (VFL).

== Family ==
The son of William Lever (1877–1909) and Sophia Amelia Lever (1882–1962), née Potter, William George Hulme Lever was born at Prahran, Victoria on 20 April 1904.

== Football ==
=== Carlton (VFL) ===
Bill Lever played fourteen games for Carlton in 1929–30.

=== Preston (VFA) ===
Bill Lever subsequently played seven games for Preston in the 1930 season.

== Military service ==
Aged 36, Lever enlisted in the Volunteer Defence Corps during World War II in 1940, and served in Melbourne until 1944.
