= Pepa Randall =

Australian rules footballer

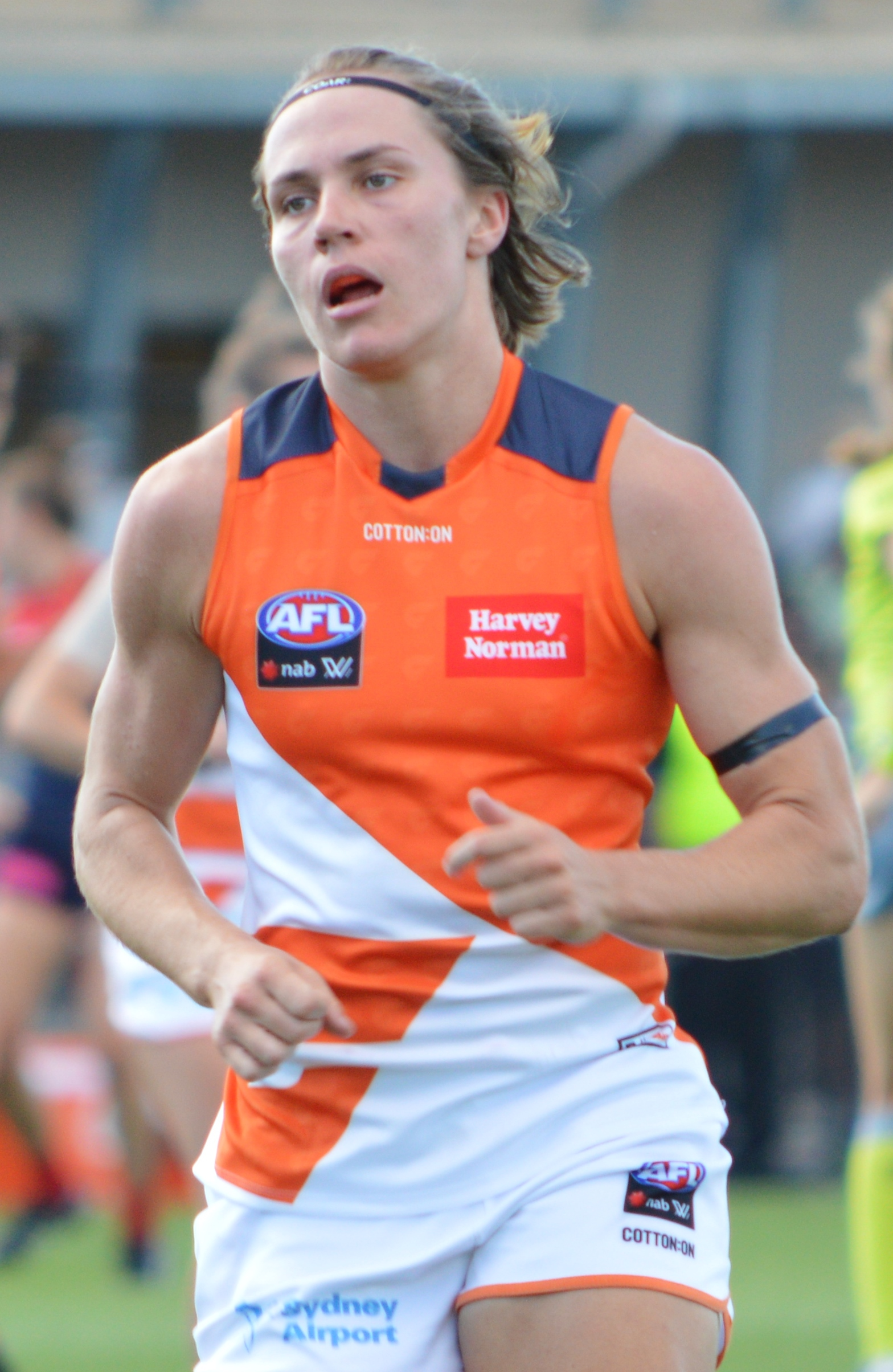
- Randall with Greater Western Sydney in February 2018

Personal information
- Born: 1 April 1996 (age 30)
- Original team: Eastern Devils (VFL Women's)
- Draft: No. 121, 2016 AFL Women's draft
- Debut: Round 1, 2018, Greater Western Sydney vs. Melbourne, at Casey Fields
- Height: 172 cm (5 ft 8 in)
- Position: Defender

Club information
- Current club: Greater Western Sydney
- Number: 21

Playing career^{1}
Years	Club	Games (Goals)
2017	Melbourne	0 (0)
2018–	Greater Western Sydney	51 (0)
Total		51 (0)
- ^{1} Playing statistics correct to the end of the 2023 season.

Pepa Randall (born 1 April 1996) is an Australian rules footballer playing for the Greater Western Sydney Giants in the AFL Women's (AFLW).

Randall played state league football with the Eastern Devils in the VFL Women's competition.

She was drafted by Melbourne with their sixteenth pick and the one hundred and twenty first selection overall in the 2016 AFL Women's draft. Randall failed to play a match with Melbourne in the 2017 AFL Women's season before being traded to Greater Western Sydney in exchange for Ashleigh Guest ahead of 2018. She made her debut in the six point loss to Melbourne at Casey Fields in the opening round of the 2018 season.

She is the granddaughter and great-granddaughter of former Hawthorn footballers Trevor Randall and Viv Randall.
