= Viv Randall =

Australian rules footballer, born 1914

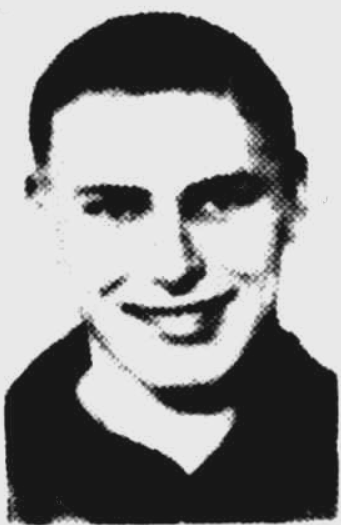

Personal information
- Full name: Herbert Vivian Randall
- Born: 7 March 1914; South Yarra, Victoria
- Died: 7 September 1985 (aged 71); Repatriation General Hospital, Heidelberg, Victoria
- Original team: Caulfield
- Height: 170 cm (5 ft 7 in)
- Weight: 74 kg (163 lb)
- Position: Wing

Playing career^{1}
Years	Club	Games (Goals)
1934–1938	Hawthorn	73 (4)
1939–1940	Camberwell (VFA)	23 (9)

Representative team honours
Years	Team	Games (Goals)
1936–1937	Victoria	2
- ^{1} Playing statistics correct to the end of 1938.

Herbert Vivian "Viv" Randall (7 March 1914 – 7 September 1985) was an Australian rules footballer who played with Hawthorn in the Victorian Football League (VFL).

== Football ==
Randall, a wingman, joined Hawthorn from Federal District Football League (FDFL) club Caulfield.

He had particularly strong seasons in 1935 and 1936 when he polled 10 and 12 votes respectively in the Brownlow Medal, finishing as Hawthorn's best vote getter on each occasion.

Randall made two appearances for Victoria at interstate football. He played against the Victorian Football Association in 1936 and South Australia the following year.

He played his last season for Hawthorn in 1938. He then crossed to the VFA without a clearance during the throw-pass era, joining Camberwell.

== Military service ==
During World War II, Randall served as a sapper in New Guinea.

== Death ==
He died at the Repatriation General Hospital, in Heidelberg, Victoria, on 7 September 1985.

== Honours and achievements ==
Individual

- Hawthorn life member

== Family ==
His son, Trevor Randall, played with Hawthorn in 1960 and his granddaughter Pepa Randall plays for GWS Giants in the AFLW.
