= Trevor Randall =

Australian rules footballer

Personal information
- Full name: Trevor Randall
- Born: 20 August 1940 (age 86)
- Original team: Murrumbeena
- Height: 183 cm (6 ft 0 in)
- Weight: 86 kg (190 lb)

Playing career^{1}
Years	Club	Games (Goals)
1960	Hawthorn	2 (0)
- ^{1} Playing statistics correct to the end of 1960.

Trevor Randall (born 20 August 1940) is a former Australian rules footballer who played with Hawthorn in the Victorian Football League (VFL).

Randall captain-coached Rochester to runners up in 1964 and 1965 in the Bendigo Football League.

His father, Viv Randall also played for Hawthorn, and his granddaughter, Pepa Randall plays football in the AFL Women's league.
