= Geoff Barber =

Australian rules footballer (born 1937)

Personal information
- Full name: Geoffrey L Barber
- Born: 1 November 1937
- Original team: Kilmore
- Height: 177 cm (5 ft 10 in)
- Weight: 65 kg (143 lb)
- Position: wing/half forward

Playing career^{1}
Years	Club	Games (Goals)
1959–60	Essendon	5 (0)
- ^{1} Playing statistics correct to the end of 1960.

Geoffrey L Barber (born 1 November 1937) is a former Australian rules footballer who played with Essendon in the Victorian Football League (VFL).

Barber played with the Essendon Reserves in 1958, before making his senior VFL debut in 1959.

He later played country football for Yarragon from 1961 to 1964, where he won the 1964 West Gippsland Football League best and fairest award, then with Rochester in 1965 and 1966 and lastly with Bamawm from 1967 to 1972, where he won the Echuca Football League best and fairest award.
