= Harold Bennett (footballer) =

Australian rules footballer, born 1891

Personal information
- Full name: Harold James Bennett
- Born: 9 June 1891; Heathcote, Victoria
- Died: 9 July 1964 (aged 73); Fitzroy, Victoria
- Original teams: Melbourne High School, Rochester (GVDFA)

Playing career^{1}
Years	Club	Games (Goals)
1911	University	17 (2)
1914	South Melbourne	7 (0)
Total		24 (2)
- ^{1} Playing statistics correct to the end of 1914.

Harold James Bennett (9 June 1891 – 9 July 1964) was an Australian rules footballer.

Bennett started his Victorian Football League (VFL) career with University, playing most of the 1911 VFL season. It was his only year as study requirements took precedence.

Bennett moved to Goulburn Valley District Football Association club Rochester before being lured back to the VFL, starting the 1914 VFL season with South Melbourne, before returning to Rochester and playing in their 1914 GVDFA premiership win over Shepparton.
