= Noel Jarvis =

Australian rules footballer

Personal information
- Born: 12 December 1924
- Died: 14 February 1975 (aged 50); Clifton Hill, Victoria
- Original team: East Brunswick
- Height: 170 cm (5 ft 7 in)
- Weight: 66 kg (146 lb)

Playing career^{1}
| Years | Club | Games (Goals) |
| 1944–1952 | Fitzroy | 159 (31) |
- ^{1} Playing statistics correct to the end of 1952.

Noel Jarvis (12 December 1924 – 14 February 1975) was an Australian rules footballer who played for Fitzroy in the Victorian Football League (VFL).

Jarvis played as a wingman and won premierships in both the Seniors and Reserves with Fitzroy in his debut season, 1944. He represented the VFL at the 1947 Hobart Carnival and in 1952.

Jarvis was appointed as captain-coach of Rochester in the Bendigo Football League in 1953.

In 1975, Jarvis was found dead in a Clifton Hill street. He had fallen to his death while intoxicated.
