= Bruce Edge =

Australian rules footballer

Personal information
- Full name: Norman Bruce Edge
- Born: 30 April 1924
- Died: 29 September 1994 (aged 70); Kyabram
- Original team: Rochester

Playing career^{1}
Years	Club	Games (Goals)
1945	Melbourne	3 (0)
- ^{1} Playing statistics correct to the end of 1945.

Bruce Edge (30 April 1924 – 29 September 1994) was an Australian rules footballer who played with Melbourne in the Victorian Football League (VFL).

Edge played three consecutive matches for Melbourne in 1945, from rounds 16 to 18, before returning to play out the season with Rochester Football Club.
