= Charlie Van Der Bist =

Australian rules footballer, born 1915

Personal information
- Full name: Charles John Van Der Bist
- Born: 15 June 1915
- Died: 6 May 1970 (aged 54)
- Original teams: Rochester, Mordialloc
- Height: 166 cm (5 ft 5 in)
- Weight: 77 kg (170 lb)

Playing career^{1}
Years	Club	Games (Goals)
1939–40	Hawthorn	7 (7)
- ^{1} Playing statistics correct to the end of 1940.

Charlie Van Der Bist (15 June 1915 – 6 May 1970) was an Australian rules footballer who played with Hawthorn in the Victorian Football League (VFL).

Originally from Rochester, he played with Mordialloc in 1938, winning the Frankston (Federal) Football League best and fairest award, before playing with Hawthorn in 1939 and 1940.

In 1939, Van Der Bist was hit by Ron Barassi Senior in a match against Melbourne. Barassi later received a four-week suspension.

Van Der Bist won the 1951 Central Gippsland Football League goal kicking award with 67 goals, playing for Warragul Football Club.

In 1933, Van Der Bist was shot in the face with a shot gun when out shooting hares.

Van Der Bist represented the Echuca Cricket Association at Melbourne Country Week in 1937.

Van Der Bist was enlisted in the Australian Army at Geraldton, Western Australia.
