= Roy Files =

Australian rules footballer

Personal information
- Full name: Roy Files
- Born: 23 October 1933 (age 93)
- Original team: North Colts
- Height: 179 cm (5 ft 10 in)
- Weight: 76 kg (168 lb)

Playing career^{1}
Years	Club	Games (Goals)
1954, 1956	North Melbourne	10 (12)
- ^{1} Playing statistics correct to the end of 1956.

Roy Files (born 23 October 1933) is a former Australian rules footballer who played with North Melbourne in the Victorian Football League (VFL).

Files played with Rochester in the Bendigo Football League in 1955.
