= Kevin Barrett (footballer) =

Australian rules footballer (1915–1987)

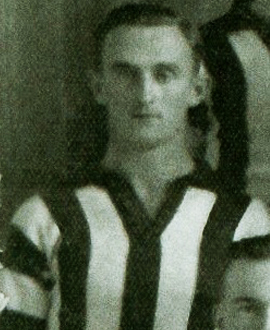
- Barrett in 1940

Personal information
- Full name: Kevin Alwyn Barrett
- Born: 10 July 1915; Rochester, Victoria
- Died: 14 February 1984 (aged 68); Pambula, New South Wales
- Original team: Rochester
- Height: 177 cm (5 ft 10 in)
- Weight: 70.5 kg (155 lb)

Playing career^{1}
Years	Club	Games (Goals)
1940	Collingwood	4 (4)
1941	South Melbourne	4 (6)
Total		8 (10)
- ^{1} Playing statistics correct to the end of 1941.

Kevin Alwyn Barrett (10 July 1915 – 14 February 1984) was an Australian rules footballer who played with Collingwood and South Melbourne in the Victorian Football League (VFL).

After six seasons with Rochester in the Bendigo Football League, Barrett was recruited to Collingwood in 1940.
