= Gerry Beare =

Australian rules footballer, born 1905

Personal information
- Full name: George Gerald Beare
- Born: 3 July 1905; Lauriston, Victoria
- Died: 28 September 1983 (aged 78); Bendigo, Victoria
- Original team: Rochester
- Height: 177 cm (5 ft 10 in)
- Weight: 73 kg (161 lb)
- Positions: back pocket, back flank

Playing career
Years	Club	Games (Goals)
1922	Xavier College	
1923	Rochester	
1924	Richmond	
1924	Stawell & Richmond	2 (0)
1925	Pt Fairy	
1926	Sth Ballarat	
1927	Watchem	
1928	Melbourne & Kyneton	2 (Melb)
1929	Sth Ballarat	
1930	Daylesford	

Career highlights
- Premiership captain-coach 1925,1926,1927,1928,1931,1932; Runners-Up 1929,1934, League Best & Fairest 1927, VFL senior games 4, Seconds games (Richmond) 46 in 1924,1926-27, 1930; Best on Ground Ballarat League Team v Subiaco (WA) 1930,

George Gerald Beare (3 July 1905 – 28 September 1983) was an Australian rules footballer who played with Richmond and Melbourne in the Victorian Football League (VFL). Between his two VFL stints he played for South Ballarat, and after leaving Melbourne he played for Kyneton.

Beare was described as an "Old Xavier College boy" when he signed with Richmond from Rochester in 1924.

Beare coached Sale Football Club in 1931. Beare then coached Kyneton CYMS in 1932, Griffith (NSW) in 1933, Sorrento in 1934, Kyneton in 1935, Fitzroy seconds in 1936, Yeronga (Brisbane) in 1937 and 1938, Old Xaverians (amateurs) in 1946 and Collegians (amateurs) in 1952.
