= Lachlan Sim =

Australian rules footballer and coach

Personal information
- Full name: Lachlan Sim
- Born: 24 November 1969 (age 56)
- Original team: Moe (GFL)
- Draft: No.58, 1988 national draft
- Height: 174 cm (5 ft 9 in)
- Weight: 70 kg (154 lb)

Playing career^{1}
Years	Club	Games (Goals)
1989–1991	Brisbane Bears	21 (5)
- ^{1} Playing statistics correct to the end of 1991.

Career highlights
- Brisbane Bears reserves premiership 1991

Lachlan Sim (born 24 November 1969) is a former Australian rules footballer who played with the Brisbane Bears in the Victorian/Australian Football League (VFL/AFL).

Originally from Gippsland Football League club Moe, Sim came to Brisbane from the 1988 VFL draft and played six games in his first season with the Bears. Sim made eight more appearances in 1990 and seven in 1991. He was a member of the Brisbane side which won the 1991 reserves grand final.

After leaving Queensland Sim returned to Gippsland where he would both play and coach. An electrician by profession, he coached the Gippsland Power in the 2003 and 2004 TAC Cup seasons.
