= Con O'Toole =

Australian rules footballer

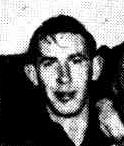

Personal information
- Full name: Cornelius O'Toole
- Born: 25 February 1930
- Died: 2 April 2011 (aged 81); Geelong, Victoria
- Original team: Ultima / Tooborac
- Height: 182 cm (6 ft 0 in)
- Weight: 87 kg (192 lb)

Playing career^{1}
| Years | Club | Games (Goals) |
| 1950 | Melbourne | 4 (0) |
- ^{1} Playing statistics correct to the end of 1950.

Cornelius "Con" O'Toole (25 February 1930 – 2 April 2011) was an Australian rules footballer who played with Melbourne in the Victorian Football League (VFL).

O'Toole, a ruckman from Ultima, was a member of Melbourne's 1949 reserves premiership team. The following year he made four appearances in the seniors and then returned to the Ultima Football Club, as captain-coach.

He spent the 1954 football season with Swan Hill, whom he captain-coached.

In 1955 he made his way to Goulburn Valley Football League club Rushworth and won that year's Morrison Medal while acting as captain-coach.

When his employment with the Victoria Police Force brought him to Rochester he was appointed captain-coach of the town's Bendigo Football League side, the Rochester Tigers. He guided the club to back to back premierships in 1962 and 1963, the former finishing the season undefeated.

== Links ==
- Con O'Toole player profile via Demonwiki
