= Geoff Dupuy =

Australian rules footballer (1937–2024)

Personal information
- Full name: Geoffrey Maurice Dupuy
- Born: 31 January 1937
- Died: 7 June 2024 (aged 87)
- Original team: Rochester
- Height: 180 cm (5 ft 11 in)
- Weight: 81 kg (179 lb)
- Position: Centre half back

Playing career^{1}
Years	Club	Games (Goals)
1957	Hawthorn	1 (0)
- ^{1} Playing statistics correct to the end of 1957.

Geoffrey Maurice Dupuy (31 January 1937 – 7 June 2024) was an Australian rules footballer who played with Hawthorn in the Victorian Football League (VFL).

Dupey was recruited from Rochester in the Bendigo Football League in 1955. He died on 7 June 2024, at the age of 87.
