= Ron Martin (footballer) =

Australian rules footballer

Personal information
- Full name: Ronald Hampton Douglas Martin
- Born: 14 September 1904; Subiaco, Western Australia
- Died: 25 June 1984 (aged 79); South Melbourne, Victoria
- Original teams: Rochester, Stratford
- Height: 177 cm (5 ft 10 in)
- Weight: 74 kg (163 lb)

Playing career^{1}
Years	Club	Games (Goals)
1930	South Melbourne	4 (3)
- ^{1} Playing statistics correct to the end of 1930.

Ronald Hampton Douglas Martin (14 September 1904 – 25 June 1984) was an Australian rules footballer who played with South Melbourne in the Victorian Football League (VFL).

Martin was recruited from South Melbourne Districts via Stratford in Gippsland, where he coached in 1929 and debuted for South Melbourne in round nine against Geelong in 1930.

Martin coached Rochester in 1928.
