= George Ogilvie (footballer) =

Australian rules footballer

Personal information
- Full name: George Colin Ogilvie
- Born: 12 May 1899; Bendigo, Victoria
- Died: 9 February 1957 (aged 57)
- Original team: Echuca
- Height: 180 cm (5 ft 11 in)
- Weight: 86 kg (190 lb)
- Position: Centre

Playing career^{1}
| Years | Club | Games (Goals) |
| 1920 | Richmond | 2 (0) |
| 1921 | Footscray | |
| 1922–1924 | Port Melbourne | 42 |
| 1929 | Yarraville | |
- ^{1} Playing statistics correct to the end of 1929.

George Colin Ogilvie, Junior (12 May 1899 – 9 February 1957) was an Australian rules footballer who played with Richmond in the Victorian Football League (VFL), and for Footscray, Port Melbourne and Yarraville in the Victorian Football Association (VFA).

He joined Richmond from Echuca in late 1920, and played in two games – the club's round 18 match and its semi-final – to high acclaim, before his permit was revoked after it was determined that he was tied to Essendon's district and was ineligible to play for Richmond; Ogilvie had lived in Essendon's district prior to the World War I, and although he served almost three years in France during World War I, the time away was not long enough for Essendon's residential claim to him to have expired. Consequently, he missed Richmond's grand final victory. The following year, Ogilvie crossed to VFA club Footscray without a clearance, earning him a disqualification from the VFL. He spent one year at Footscray.

In 1922, Ogilvie moved to Bendigo, but was recruited by and cleared to Port Melbourne, commuting weekly from Bendigo to the games, where he became noted as one of the stars of the Association. He was a member of Port Melbourne's 1922 VFA premiership team; Ogilvie alleged that one of his Footscray opponents offered him a bribe during the grand final to throw the game – similar accusations were made against other Footscray officials – but there were no corroborating witnesses and the allegations were not upheld. Ogilvie returned to live in Echuca in 1923, but continued commuting to play with Port Melbourne until the end of the 1924 season.

In 1925, Ogilvie ceased playing for Port Melbourne. He was keen to return to play with the Echuca Football Club, but due to affiliations between the Bendigo Football League and the VFL, his VFL disqualification for joining Footscray without a clearance was reciprocally valid and he was unable to obtain a playing permit. He sat out of football for 2½ years until his disqualification was lifted in June 1927, when the VFL agreed to lift the suspensions of returned soldiers who had crossed without permits; he promptly joined Echuca, and played there until the end of 1928, leading the club to a premiership in that year. He spent another year in the VFA in 1929, joining the Yarraville Football Club as captain-coach, then returned again to captain-coach Echuca from 1930 until 1933, then coached Rochester from 1934 until 1937.

Although his senior career in Melbourne was brief, Ogilvie was a very highly regarded player at his time. Playing as a centreman, he was heavyset but agile with a strong kick in play, a good high mark, and an accurate place kick for goal. During his three years at Port Melbourne he was considered one of the star players in the competition. In 1934, South Melbourne captain-coach Jack Bisset went as far as naming Ogilvie as the best player he had ever seen, even ranking him above legend Haydn Bunton, Sr. (who at that time was four years into his career). He is considered one of the best players ever to play in the Bendigo Football League, and a rivalry trophy named in his honour is contested between his two country clubs, Echuca and Rochester.

Ogilvie remained prominent in both sport and community in Echuca following his retirement from football, serving as an Echuca Football Club committeeman, Bendigo Football league delegate, and for a time in the late 1940s as mayor of Echuca. He was also a talented cricket and bowls player.

His father, George Colin Ogilvie - Senior, had a long and distinguished football career, playing in the Bendigo Football League from 1895 to 1908, then with Footscray and Yarraville in the VFA from 1909 to 1913.
