= Hugh Murnane =

Australian rules footballer, born 1916

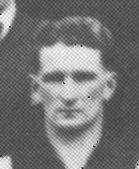

Personal information
- Full name: Hugh Richard Murnane
- Born: 29 October 1916; St Arnaud, Victoria
- Died: 13 March 1974 (aged 57); Parkville, Victoria
- Original team: Rochester
- Height: 187 cm (6 ft 2 in)
- Weight: 80 kg (176 lb)
- Position: Centre Half Forward

Playing career^{1}
Years	Club	Games (Goals)
1937–40	Melbourne	52 (42)
- ^{1} Playing statistics correct to the end of 1940.

Hugh Richard Murnane (29 October 1916 – 13 March 1974) was an Australian rules footballer who played with Melbourne in the Victorian Football League (VFL), who was widely regarded as the recruit of the year in 1937.

== Football ==
Murnane was recruited from Rochester Football Club in the Bendigo Football League and played 17 games in 1937, debuting in round one against Richmond at the Melbourne Cricket Ground.

Murnane played in Melbourne's 1939 Reserves VFL premiership side, interestingly alongside former Rochester team-mate, Adrian Dullard.

== Military service ==
Murnane later served in the Australian Army for two years during World War II.

== Death ==
He died at Parkville, Victoria on 13 March 1974.
