= Charlie Richards (Australian footballer) =

Australian rules footballer (1910–1990)

Personal information
- Full name: Charles George Donard Richards
- Born: 16 August 1910; Toongabbie, Victoria
- Died: 3 May 1990 (aged 79); Moe, Victoria
- Original team: Moe
- Height: 187 cm (6 ft 2 in)
- Weight: 102 kg (225 lb)
- Position: Ruckman

Playing career^{1}
Years	Club	Games (Goals)
1933	Footscray	2 (0)
- ^{1} Playing statistics correct to the end of 1933.

Charles George Donard Richards (16 August 1910 – 3 May 1990) was an Australian rules footballer who played with Footscray in the Victorian Football League (VFL).

Richards was recruited from Moe Football Club and returned there in 1934.
