= Des Nisbet =

Australian rules footballer

Personal information
- Full name: John Desmond Nisbet
- Born: 29 October 1921; Caulfield, Victoria
- Died: 29 November 2004 (aged 83)
- Original teams: Rochester, Caulfield City
- Height: 180 cm (5 ft 11 in)
- Weight: 79 kg (174 lb)

Playing career^{1}
Years	Club	Games (Goals)
1944–1952	St Kilda	110 (6)
- ^{1} Playing statistics correct to the end of 1952.

John Desmond Nisbet (29 October 1921 – 29 November 2004) was an Australian rules footballer who played with St Kilda in the Victorian Football League (VFL).

Nisbet, a defender, was originally from Rochester and also played football at Caulfield City prior to playing 110 games for St Kilda.

Nisbet served in the Australian Army during World War II.

Nisbet was runner-up in the 1947 senior best and fairest award. He then served as coach of the St Kilda seconds. From 1958 to 1983 he was Chairman of Selectors for St Kilda. In 2008 he was inducted into the club's Hall of Fame.

His son, Darryl, played one game for St Kilda in the 1970 VFL season.

== Links ==
- 1947 action photo of Des Nisbet
