= Kevin Duffy (footballer) =

Australian rules footballer

Personal information
- Full name: John Kevin Duffy
- Born: 13 April 1897; Bendigo, Victoria
- Died: 5 November 1977 (aged 80); Windsor, Victoria
- Original team: Rochester
- Position: Forward

Playing career^{1}
Years	Club	Games (Goals)
1920	St Kilda	1 (0)
- ^{1} Playing statistics correct to the end of 1920.

John Kevin Duffy (13 April 1897 – 5 November 1977) was an Australian rules footballer who played with St Kilda in the Victorian Football League (VFL).

Duffy, a forward was recruited from Rochester in the Rochester and District Football Association in 1920 to play in the last match of the season against Fitzroy.

Duffy played with the South Bendigo Football Club in 1921 and most likely played in their 1921 Bendigo Football League premiership.
