= Chris Lamborn =

Australian rules footballer

Personal information
- Full name: Christopher John Lamborn
- Born: 3 April 1916; Rochester, Victoria
- Died: 7 August 1992 (aged 76); Ingham, Queensland
- Original teams: Rochester, Mornington
- Height: 180 cm (5 ft 11 in)
- Weight: 77 kg (170 lb)

Playing career^{1}
Years	Club	Games (Goals)
1938	North Melbourne	5 (0)
1943	South Melbourne	1 (0)
1944	St Kilda	4 (1)
Total		10 (1)
- ^{1} Playing statistics correct to the end of 1944.

Christopher John Lamborn (3 April 1916 – 7 August 1992) was an Australian rules footballer who played with North Melbourne, South Melbourne and St Kilda in the Victorian Football League (VFL).

Lamborn was recruited from Rochester in the Bendigo Football League in 1938.

Lamborn kicked more than 100 goals for Rochester in 1937.
