= Frank Fitzpatrick (footballer) =

Australian rules footballer

Personal information
- Full name: Frank Fitzpatrick
- Born: 2 March 1932
- Died: 27 June 2003 (aged 71)
- Original team: Rochester
- Height: 193 cm (6 ft 4 in)
- Weight: 83 kg (183 lb)

Playing career^{1}
Years	Club	Games (Goals)
1958	Geelong	9 (1)
- ^{1} Playing statistics correct to the end of 1958.

Frank Fitzpatrick (2 March 1932 – 27 June 2003) was an Australian rules footballer who played with Geelong in the Victorian Football League (VFL).

Fitzpatrick was recruited to Geelong on the back of two strong seasons playing for Rochester in the Bendigo Football League. He won the 1956 and 1957 Michelsen Medals. While at Geelong he made nine appearances, all in the 1958 VFL season.
