= Don Keyter =

Australian rules footballer

Personal information
- Born: 13 September 1931
- Died: 11 November 1986 (aged 55)
- Original team: Merbein
- Height: 185 cm (6 ft 1 in)
- Weight: 81 kg (179 lb)

Playing career^{1}
Years	Club	Games (Goals)
1953–1958	South Melbourne	86 (81)
- ^{1} Playing statistics correct to the end of 1958.

Don Keyter (13 September 1931 – 11 November 1986) was an Australian rules footballer who played with South Melbourne in the Victorian Football League (VFL).

== Career ==
=== South Melbourne ===
Keyter, a ruckman and centre half-forward from Merbein, played 86 league games for South Melbourne, from 1953 to 1958. He was a Victoria "B" interstate representative in 1957, against Tasmania. Also that year, he kicked a goal to give South Melbourne a four-point win over then reigning premiers Melbourne at Lake Oval in round 17. His snap shot, from 30 yards out in the pocket, went through for a goal as the siren went.

=== Coaching ===
In 1959 and 1960, Keyter was captain-coach of New South Wales club Griffith in the South West Football League (New South Wales), then coached in the Wimmera Football League. He joined Latrobe Valley Football League side Moe, as coach, for the 1963 season and performed well enough on the field to gain the most votes in the 1963 Trood Award & Rodda Medal count, for which he was ineligible due to suspension. After another season coaching Moe in 1964, Keyter was put in charge of East Hawthorn in the Metropolitan Football League in 1965 and they won three consecutive premierships in 1965, 1966 and 1967. He then went on to coach Rochester in 1968.
