= Ashley Watson =

Australian rules footballer

Personal information
- Full name: Ashley Watson
- Born: 26 March 1984 (age 42)
- Original team: Bendigo Pioneers (TAC)
- Height: 181 cm (5 ft 11 in)
- Weight: 76 kg (168 lb)

Playing career^{1}
| Years | Club | Games (Goals) |
| 2003–2005 | Kangaroos | 7 (1) |
- ^{1} Playing statistics correct to the end of 2005.

Ashley Watson (born 26 March 1984) is an Australian rules footballer who played for North Melbourne between 2003 and 2005.

He was drafted in the 2001 AFL draft with the 14th selection from Bendigo Pioneers in the TAC Cup. He played seven games in four seasons at the Kangaroos before he was delisted at the end of the 2005 season.

Watson later played for Rochester Football Club in the Goulburn Valley Football League, winning the league's Best and Fairest, the Morrison Medal, in 2015.
