= Rochester Football Club =

Rochester

Names
- Full name: Rochester Football Netball Club
- Nickname: Tigers

Club details
- Founded: 1874; 152 years ago
- Colours
- Competition: Goulburn Valley FL
- Premierships: Campaspe DFA 2 (1907, 1909); Echuca DFA 1 (1908); Rochester DFA 2 (1910, 1922); Campaspe Valley Wartime FL 2 (1944, 1945); Bendigo FL 4 (1958, 1959, 1962, 1963); GVFL 4 (1914, 1992, 1999, 2008)
- Ground: Moon Oval, Rochester

Uniforms
Home

Other information
- Official website: Kyabram FNC Gameday website

The Rochester Football Netball Club, nicknamed the Tigers, is an Australian rules football and netball club, based in the town of Rochester, Victoria. Its teams currently play in the Goulburn Valley League, where Rochester played for the first time in 1913.

== History ==
The Rochester Football Club was formed in 1874 at Tidy's Rest Down Hotel, Rochester, with a committee elected and players resolved to practice with the intention of beating Echuca.

On 1 June 1877 at Oliver's Cafe the Victorian Football Association (VFA) was formed, with Rochester one of the foundation clubs.

Between 1874 and 1889 (apart from 1877 in the VFA), there appears to be no evidence that Rochester played in any formal football competitions, but did play some friendly matches against local teams in most years, with regular matches against Echuca.

Rochester played in the Echuca District Football Association against Echuca, Echuca East and Cummeragunja in 1890.

From 1891 to 1893, Rochester played in the Northern District Football Association and in 1892, Rochester won the Aitken Football Premiership Trophy by finishing on top of the ladder, but were disqualified for playing a player without a permit, after a protest from Echuca. A grand final match was then arranged between Rochester and Echuca, but Rochester refused to attend and the premiership was awarded to Echuca.

In 1893, Rochester were runners up to Echuca East for the Lyon & Sons Trophy.

The Rochester Juniors were an official club in 1887 and played against Albion(Sandhurst FC Juniors).

In 1903, Rochester had two teams that played in the Northern Districts Football Association - Rochester Hopetouns and Rochester Federals.

In 1904, Rochester FC did not arrange their AGM until May and by that time there was already two other football club's formed in Rochester - Rochester Imperials and Rochester Federals FC. So the Rochester FC decided to go into recess for the 1904 season. Then in 1905, both Imperials and Federals merged to form one senior club and entered the Campaspe District Football Association.

Rochester FC guernsey's colours in 1906 were blue with a red sash and played in the Northern District Football Association. In 1906 Rochester's 'new football oval area will measure about 2 3/4 acres, being 7 chains long, 5 broad and 19 in circumference. Outside this, about half a chain. A stout wire rope is to be placed to keen barrackers in their places'.

In 1910, Rochester entered two teams, Ramblers and Rovers, into the Football Association, with the Rovers winning the premiership.

Rochester Rovers 3.6 - 24 lost the 1911 Rochester Football Association grand final to Digorra 4.3 - 27.

In 1911, the Rochester DFA played the Bendigo Football League in a match at the Upper Reserve (Queen Elizabeth Oval), with Bendigo: 2.12 - 24 defeating Rochester: 1.6 - 12.

In 1912, the Rochester DFA played the Bendigo Football League in a match at the Upper Reserve (Queen Elizabeth Oval), with the match resulting in a draw, with the scores 6.6 - 42 each.

More than 20 Rochester players joined the war effort in 1915, and some never came home. William Campbell, Cyril Downe, William Edwards, Victor Lamb, Norman Rae, Vincent & Donald McInnes, Patrick Morrissey, Sam Sherlock all died in World War One.

In 1920, Bamawm: 4.7 - 31 defeated Rochester Imperials: 2.6 - 18 to win the Rochester & District Football Association.

In 1922, Rochester defeated Bamawn in the final, but Bamawn as minor premiers challenged Rochester to a grand final, in which Rochester won.

From 1933 to 1935, there was a Rochester Rovers FC that played in the Echuca District Football League.

A Rochester Football Association was formed in 1938 from the following clubs - Methodists, Naneella, Presbyterians, Rochester and St. Joseph's.

=== Goulburn Valley FNL ===
1913 & 1914 and 1973 to 2021

Rochester entered the Goulburn Valley FL for the 1913 season; they were eventually runner-up to Shepparton. The following year, they defeated Echuca in the Grand Final. With the outbreak of World War I, the Goulburn Valley FL did not reform in 1915, so Rochester entered the Bendigo FL.

1990's

The 1990s was a successful period, culminating in six senior grand final berths.

Both seniors and reserves made the grand final in 1990, but both teams lost.

The seniors made the grand final in 1992, defeating Tatura by two points in wet conditions.

They made the grand final again in 1993, but was defeated by Shepparton in controversial circumstances by a kick after the siren.

Rochester participated in a night series Centenary celebration of the GVFL. Rochester won the preliminary games and then defeated Tatura in the final. Anthony McPhee kicked a goal from 40m near the siren to put Rochester 5 points ahead.

In 2008 they beat Seymour for the premiership cup denying Seymour the chance of winning 4 cups in a row.

=== Bendigo FL ===
1915, 1923 to 1941, 1946 to 1971

When the Goulburn Valley Football League went into recess in 1915, Rochester joined the Bendigo Football League. In April 1915, Rochester FC ordered 25 black colored guernseys, with a red band, prior to joining the Bendigo Football League. In July 1915, Rochester withdrew from the Bendigo Football League (BFL) due to the pressure of fielding a team each week, due to many young players encouraged to and enlisting in the Australian Army.

After four years in the Rochester District Football Association, playing against Bamawan, Nanneella, Rochester's two teams, Imperials and Rovers merged and Rochester FC returned to the BFL in 1923. In 1924, Rochester's James Doyle finished second in the goal kicking tally with 61 goals.

In 1923 Rochester won the Minor Premiership in the Bendigo FL, but lost the grand final to Sandhurst, then in 1924, Eaglehawk defeated Rochester in the grand final.

In 1926, Rochester finished sixth on the ladder and collected the wooden spoon, with four wins for the season.

Rochester did not win a game during the 1928 BFL season.

Former South Melbourne player, Bill Berryman was appointed as captain-coach in 1929, at £10 per week and recorded their first win for the year against Echuca on Saturday, 1 June 1929, recording only two wins for the season.

Former player, W Slattery coached Rochester in 1931.

In 1933, Rochester's Ted Hooper played his 98th consecutive game and was presented with an eight-day clock! In early 1934, 24 year old, Ted Hooper played his 100th consecutive game for Rochester, capping it off with three goals.

George Ogilvie coached Echuca from 1930 to 1933, then played with Rochester in 1934, then took over as captain-coach from 1935 to 1937.

In 1940, Rochester commenced playing in the BFL, but in June, the four rural clubs - Echuca East, Kyneton, Maryborough and Rochester were forced out of the competition, due to the expense involved in playing. The four Bendigo based teams remained in the competition.

In late 1956, former Melbourne player, Noel McMahen was appointed as captain-coach for six years at £1,000.00 per season. Noel McMahen's era as coach was very successful for the Rochester Demons. In 1957, Rochester made the finals in his first season coaching the club. In the 1958 Grand Final, Rochester were Premiers defeating Castlemaine, winning their first Premiership in the Bendigo Football League. In 1959, Rochester were Premiers defeating Kyneton. In the 1960 Grand Final, Rochester were defeated by Kyneton. In the 1961 Grand Final, Rochester were defeated by Kyneton. Noel returned to the city in 1962 to coach South Melbourne for 3 years, however brought South Melbourne to Rochester for a practice preseason game. Ironically, it was this team's only loss for the year! The 1962 Rochester Demons were Premiers & Champions, defeating Golden Square in the Grand Final. In 1963, Rochester were Premiers defeating Kyneton, their last Premiership in the Bendigo FL. In the 1964 Grand Final, Rochester were defeated by Golden Square. In the 1965 Grand Final, Rochester were defeated by Golden Square.

By 1971, Rochester was being woo-ed by the Goulburn Valley FL, as it was keen to expand, but the Bendigo FL refused a clearance. In 1971, Rochester made the first semi-final played against Echuca at the Queen Elizabeth Oval in the Heart of Bendigo but Rochester wanted the game at their home ground, but the BFL board disagreed, the game went ahead at the QEO and Rochester lost the game to Echuca. The club went into recess for the 1972 season. It commenced with the GVFL in 1973, changing from its red and black colours to black and yellow.

== Football competitions timeline ==
- 1877 - Victorian Football Association
- 1890 - Echuca District Football Association
- 1891 - Northern District Football Association / Sternberg's Football Trophy
- 1892 - Northern District Football Association / Aitken Football Trophy
- 1893 - Northern District Football Association / Lyon & Son's Football Trophy
- 1894 - Northern District Football Association
- 1894 to 1900 - No evidence that Rochester played in any official competitions, but did play some friendly matches against local teams in most years.
- 1900 & 1901 - Northern District Football Association / McMaster's (Hotel) Football Trophy
- 1902 & 1903 - Northern District Football Association
- 1904 - Club in recess. Rochester Federals & Rochester Imperials played in the Campaspe District Football Association in 1904.
- 1905 - Campaspe District Football Association
- 1906 - Northern District Football Association
- 1907 - Campaspe District Football Association - Holmes Trophy
- 1908 - Echuca District Football Association
- 1909 - Campaspe Valley District Football Association
- 1910 & 1911 - Rochester District Football Association
- 1912 - No formal football competition. Rochester did play several matches against other local towns.
- 1913 & 1914 - Goulburn Valley Football League
- 1915 - Bendigo Football League
- 1916 to 1918 - Club in recess due to World War One
- 1919 to 1922 - Rochester District Football Association
- 1923 to 1941 - Bendigo Football League
- 1942 & 1943 - Club in recess due to World War Two
- 1944 & 1945 - Campaspe Valley Wartime Football League
- 1946 to 1971 - Bendigo Football League
- 1972 - Club in recess
- 1973 to 2019 - Goulburn Valley Football League
- 2020 - Club in recess. COVID-19
- 2021 - 2025 - Goulburn Valley Football League

== Football Premierships ==
Seniors

League	Total flags	Premiership years
Campaspe District Football Association	2	1907 1909
Echuca District Football Association	1	1908
Rochester District Football Association	2	1910, 1922
Goulburn Valley Football League	4	1914, 1992, 1999, 2008
Campaspe Valley Wartime Football League	2	1944, 1945
Bendigo Football League	4	1958, 1959, 1962, 1963.

Reserves

- Bendigo Football League - 1953, 1958
- Goulburn Valley Football League - Nil

Thirds / Under 18's

- Goulburn Valley Football League - 1996

== Football League Best & Fairest Winners ==
Seniors

- Bendigo Football League:

Fred Wood Medal

- 1930 – Len Major Major played with the Carlton Football Club Reserves in 1931.
- 1931 – Alf "Digger" Firmer
- 1934 – Dave Fraser
- 1935 – Ern "Dooley" Major

T R Davies Medal

- 1947 – Herb Zegelin
- 1950 – Herb Zegelin

Jack Michelsen Medal

- 1956 – Frank Fitzpatrick
- 1957 – Frank Fitzpatrick
- 1961 – Frank Maxwell
- 1962 – Ray Willett
- 1970 – Kevin Shinners

- Goulburn Valley Football League:

Morrison Medal

- 1988 – Mick Keenan
- 1994 – Phillip "Toot" Morgan
- 2011 – Guy Campbell
- 2015 – Ashley Watson

Reserves

- Bendigo Football League
  - 1967 - Jim Sutton
  - 1968 - John Hepworth
- Goulburn Valley Football League: Abikhair Medal
  - 1987 - F Lee
  - 2004 - N Whipp
  - 2012 - Brodie Montague

Thirds / Under 18

- Bendigo Football League
  - 1960 - Barry Rainbird
- Goulburn Valley Football Netball League: Pattison Medal
  - 1976 - B Pearson
  - 1992 - B Speers
  - 2004 - J Spizzica
  - 2009 - Scott Oakley

== Most Games ==
Senior Football

- 410 - Anthony "Tank" McPhee (a GVFNL record)
- 302 - Bruce Watson
- 300+ - Simon McCarty

== VFL / AFL Players ==
The following footballers played for Rochester FC prior to making their VFL / AFL debut & / or drafted to an AFL club.

- 1912 - Paddy Mills - Carlton. Mills returned to the VFL & played with Carlton on Saturdays & with Rochester on Wednesdays in 1912 & 13.
- 1914 - Harold Bennett - South Melbourne
- 1920 - Kevin Duffy - St. Kilda
- 1922 - Rowley Watt - Essendon
- 1924 - Gerry Beare - Richmond
- 1925 - Basil McCormack - Richmond
- 1927 - Bruce Curruthers - Essendon
- 1929 - Bill Lever - Carlton
- 1930 - Ron Martin - South Melbourne
- 1932 - Leslie Watt - Collingwood
- 1937 - Hugh Murnane - Melbourne
- 1938 - Chris Lamborn - North Melbourne
- 1938 - Peter Paterson - Essendon
- 1939 - Charlie Van Der Bist - Hawthorn
- 1940 - Kevin Barrett - Collingwood
- 1940 - Adrian Dullard - Melbourne
- 1944 - Des Nisbet - St. Kilda
- 1945 - Bruce Edge - Melbourne
- 1952 - Allen Rodgers - Footscray
- 1957 - Geoff Dupuy - Hawthorn
- 1958 - Frank Fitzpatrick - Geelong
- 1962 - Ken Colvin - South Melbourne
- 1965 - John Williams - Essendon
- 1983 - David Williams - Melbourne
- 1988 - Simon McCarty - North Melbourne. 1988 - VFL Draft, No. 46
- 1990 - Glyn Tomlinson - Geelong. 1990 - AFL draft, No. 43
- 1992 - Matthew Febey - Melbourne
- 2017 - Joe Atley - Port Adelaide

The following footballers played VFL / AFL football prior to making their debut with the Rochester FC. The year indicates their debut season at Rochester.

- 1911 - Paddy Mills - Melbourne
- 1924 - Clyde Smith - Collingwood
- 1927 - Rex De Garis - St. Kilda
- 1929 - Bill Berryman - South Melbourne
- 1930 - Danny Warr - St. Kilda
- 1934 - George Ogilvie Junior - Richmond
- 1949 - Harry Hickey - Footscray
- 1953 - Noel Jarvis - Fitzroy
- 1955 - Roy Files - North Melbourne
- 1955 - Jim Wilson - Melbourne
- 1957 - Noel McMahen - Melbourne
- 1958 - Les Pridham - Essendon
- 1959 - Geoff Barber - Essendon
- 1961 - Con O'Toole - Melbourne
- 1962 - Ray Willett - Collingwood
- 1964 - Trevor Randall - Hawthorn
- 1968 - Don Keyter - South Melbourne
- 1970 - Kevin Shinners - Richmond
- 1979 - Geoff Rosenow - Geelong
- 1992 - Jamie Duursma - Melbourne

== Club Honourboard ==
Year	President	Secretary	Treasurer	Captain/Coach	Best & Fairest	Top Goalkicker	Position
1874	Edward Dixon	James Spring		Stephen Seward			
1892	?			Henry Gregory			Runner Up
1893	D Gravell	C Gregory	C Gregory	J Graham			Runner Up
1904				Charles Moore &			
				? Lambourne			
1905	J Humphries		G Horton				
1906	Tom McIntyre	Jas Reynolds	Will Clark	S Quirk			
1907	Tom McIntyre	Will Clark					Premiers
1908	J P Small	G Williamson	G Williamson				Premiers
1909	J P Small	G Williamson	G Williamson				Premiers
1910	P Gorman			E Mertens			Premiers
1911	P Gorman	J S Ferguson	W Tomkinson				Runner Up
1912				Paddy Mills			
1913		J S Ferguson	? Gibbs	Paddy Mills			Runner Up
1914	? Gibbs	J S Ferguson	L J Wilson	Paddy Mills			Premiers
1915	M O'Neill	J S Ferguson					
1916							In recess. WWI
1917							In recess. WWI
1918							In recess. WWI
1919							
1920							Imperials R/Up
1921							Runner Up
1922	J Walsh	P McKissock					Premiers
1923				T Doyle			Runner Up
1924	H Barrass			Clyde Smith			Runner Up
1925	H Barrass	P Gorman		Bruce Carruthers			
1926	H Barrass	G Cahir	P Gorman	L Lackmann			6th
1927	P Gorman		S Collins	Rex De Garis			
1928		T L Doyle		Ron Martin			
1929		T L Doyle					
1930		G A Cahir		Danny Warr			4th
1931				W Slattery			
1932				Rowley Watt			
1933		W J Ward		Rowley Watt			7th
1934	G A Cahir	W J Ward		Alf Firmer	Dave Frazer		
1935		C Cameron &		George C Ogilvie			3rd
		L J Fletcher					
1936		L J Fletcher		George C Ogilvie			
1937				George C Ogilvie	D Fraser		
1938	W J Ward	L J Fletcher	S G Newman	Stuart Copland			
1939	W J Ward		S G Newman	Stuart Copland			3rd
1940							Season Abandoned in July. WW2
1941							
1942							In Recess. WW2
1943							In Recess. WW2
1944							Premiers
1945							Premiers
1946				Ern Vine			
1947							
1948		J E Green					
1949				Harry Hickey			3rd
1950				Harry Hickey			7th
1951				Harry Hickey			4th
1952	S Handley	Jack Green		Harry Hickey			
1953				Noel Jarvis			
1954				Noel Jarvis			
1955				Frank McRae			
1956				Kevin Curran			
1957				Noel McMahen			
1958				Noel McMahen	Frederick Rodda		Premiers
1959				Noel McMahen	Robert Kelly		Premiers
1960				Noel McMahen			Runner up
1961				Noel McMahen			Runner Up
1962				Con O'Toole	Ray Willett		Premiers & Champions
1963				Con O’Toole			Premiers
1964				Trevor Randall			Runner Up
1965				Trevor Randall			Runner Up
1966							
1967							
1968				Don Keyter			
1969							
1970							
1971							
1972							Club in recess
1990							Runner Up
1992							Premiers
1999							Premiers
2001							Runner Up
2002							Runner Up
2008							Premiers
