= Declan Keilty =

Australian rules footballer

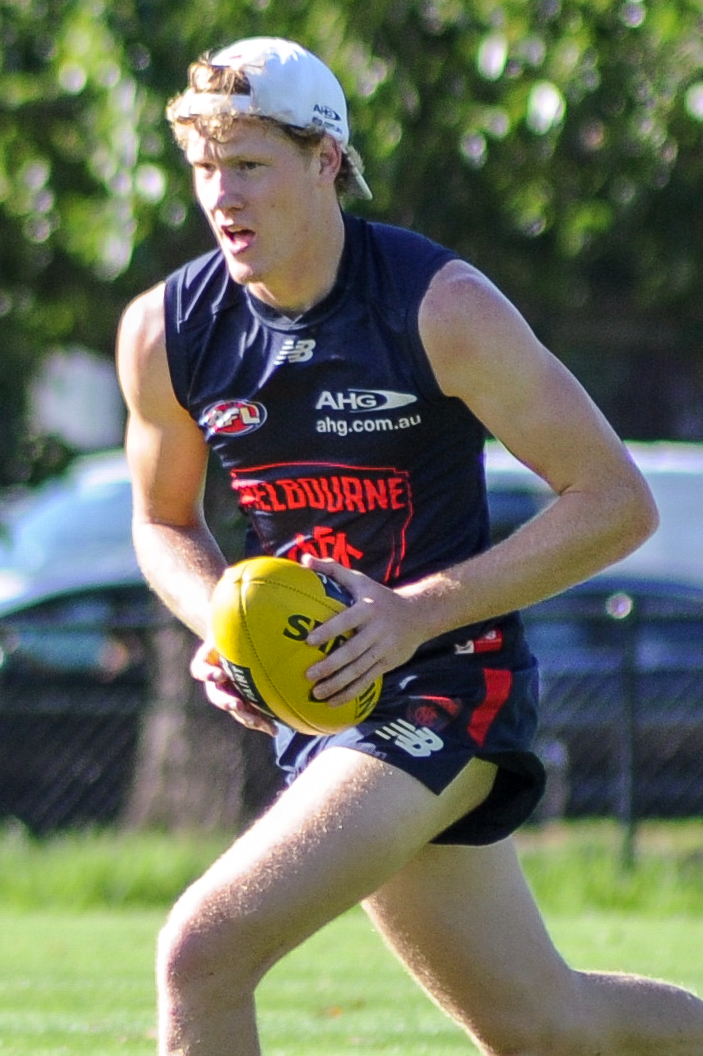
- Keilty training at Gosch's Paddock in 2017

Personal information
- Full name: Declan Keilty
- Born: 8 May 1995 (age 31); Australia
- Original team: Casey Scorpions
- Draft: No. 41 in the 2017 rookie draft
- Debut: 4 May 2019, Melbourne vs. Hawthorn, at MCG
- Height: 194 cm (6 ft 4 in)
- Weight: 94 kg (207 lb)

Playing career
Years	Club	Games (Goals)
2017-2019	Melbourne	2 (0)
2012-present	Moe	110 (69)

Declan Keilty (born 8 May 1995) is a former professional Australian rules footballer who played for the Melbourne Football Club in the Australian Football League (AFL). He was selected at pick #41 in the 2017 rookie draft. Keilty made his senior debut against Hawthorn in round 7 of the 2019 season. After playing two senior games, Keilty was delisted by Melbourne at the end of 2019. In 2021, he was hired by Moe Football Netball Club as senior coach for the next two years.

== Statistics ==
Statistics are correct to the end of 2019

Legend
G	Goals	K	Kicks	D	Disposals	T	Tackles
B	Behinds	H	Handballs	M	Marks

Season	Team	No.	Games	Totals							Averages (per game)						
Season	Team	No.	Games	G	B	K	H	D	M	T	G	B	K	H	D	M	T
2019	Melbourne	45	2	0	0	6	9	15	3	8	0.0	0.0	3.0	4.5	7.5	1.5	4.0
Career			2	0	0	6	9	15	3	8	0.0	0.0	3.0	4.5	7.5	1.5	4.0
