= Paddy Mills (Australian footballer) =

Australian rules footballer

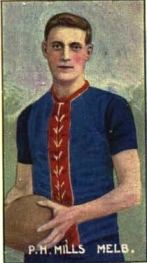

Personal information
- Full name: Patrick Henry Mills
- Born: 17 March 1884; Dandenong, Victoria
- Died: 12 July 1957 (aged 73); South Melbourne, Victoria
- Original teams: Northcote, Rochester
- Height: 174 cm (5 ft 9 in)
- Weight: 77 kg (170 lb)
- Position: Defense

Playing career^{1}
| Years | Club | Games (Goals) |
| 1903–09 | Melbourne | 83 (15) |
| 1912–13 | Carlton | 20 (0) |
| Total | | 103 (15) |
- ^{1} Playing statistics correct to the end of 1913.

Paddy Mills (17 March 1884 – 12 July 1957) was an Australian rules footballer who played with Melbourne and Carlton in the Victorian Football League (VFL).

Mills played with South Bendigo Football Club in 1910 and 1911, then with Rochester Football Club from 1912 to 1915, with Mills coaching Rochester in 1913 and 1914 (premiers), in the Wednesday afternoon Goulburn Valley Football League competition.

During 1912 and 1913, Mills was playing with Carlton on Saturday’s and with Rochester on Wednesday’s.

Mills was then captain-coach of Rochester when they moved across to play in the Bendigo Football League in 1915, just prior to World War One, with the out break of the war ultimately finishing off his football career.
