= Les Pridham =

Australian rules footballer (1937–2021)

Personal information
- Full name: Leslie Glyndwr Pridham
- Born: 30 December 1937
- Died: 19 February 2021 (aged 83)
- Original team: East Sandringham Boys Club
- Height: 168 cm (5 ft 6 in)
- Weight: 70 kg (154 lb)

Playing career^{1}
Years	Club	Games (Goals)
1957	Essendon	1 (0)
- ^{1} Playing statistics correct to the end of 1957.

Leslie Glyndwr Pridham (30 December 1937 – 19 February 2021) was an Australian rules footballer who played with Essendon in the Victorian Football League (VFL).

Pridham, a rover, made his way into the Essendon team from East Sandringham. He started out in the thirds and won a Gardiner Medal in 1957 for his performances in the league seconds. That year he made his first and only senior appearance, playing in Essendon's 27-point loss to Richmond at Punt Road Oval.

After leaving Essendon he played for Rochester.
