= Rowley Watt =

Australian rules footballer and coach

Personal information
- Full name: Rowland Hill Watt
- Born: 17 July 1898; Subiaco, Western Australia
- Died: 27 July 1970 (aged 72); Frankston, Victoria
- Original team: Rochester (Bendigo FL)
- Height: 163 cm (5 ft 4 in)
- Weight: 61 kg (134 lb)

Playing career^{1}
Years	Club	Games (Goals)
1922–1931	Essendon	141 (41)
- ^{1} Playing statistics correct to the end of 1931.

Rowland Hill Watt (17 July 1898 – 27 July 1970) was an Australian rules footballer who played for Essendon in the Victorian Football League (VFL).

Originally from Bendigo Football League (BFL) club Rochester, Watt spent a season with Essendon Association in the Victorian Football Association (VFA) before joining Essendon in 1922. He was one of the small players in the team which saw them called the 'Mosquito Fleet' and was a member of Essendon's 1923 and 1924 premiership sides. Although he started as a centreman he spent most of his time at Essendon either as a wingman, half forward flanker and occasionally roving.

Watt returned to Rochester as captain-coach in 1932.

His younger brother Rod Watt played briefly with Essendon in the mid-1920s.

== Sources ==
- Cullen, B. (2015) Harder than Football, Slattery Media Group: Melbourne. ISBN 9780992379148.
