= Darryl Nisbet =

Australian rules footballer

Personal information
- Full name: Darryl A. Nisbet
- Born: 16 June 1949 (age 77)
- Original team: Oakleigh Districts
- Height: 183 cm (6 ft 0 in)
- Weight: 78 kg (172 lb)

Playing career^{1}
Years	Club	Games (Goals)
1970	St Kilda	1 (0)

Coaching career
Years	Club	Games (W–L–D)
1977–1980	Berwick	
1984–1987	Cranbourne	
1990–1991	Sandringham	
1995–1996	Berwick	
1999	Cranbourne	
- ^{1} Playing statistics correct to the end of 1999.

Darryl A. Nisbet (born 16 June 1949) is a former Australian rules footballer who played with St Kilda in the Victorian Football League (VFL).

A defender recruited from Oakleigh Districts, Nisbet made one league appearance for St Kilda, in round 21 of the 1970 VFL season, against Collingwood at Moorabbin Oval.

Nisbet coached Berwick to premierships in 1979 and 1980. He was also in charge of Cranbourne when they won three successive premierships from 1985 to 1987.

In 2008 he was named as an assistant coach in the Mornington Peninsula Nepean Football League Team of the Century.

Nisbet's father Des, also played for St Kilda.
