= Kevin Shinners =

Australian rules footballer

Personal information
- Full name: Kevin Shinners
- Born: 24 March 1945 (age 81)
- Original team: Dandenong
- Height: 180 cm (5 ft 11 in)
- Weight: 83 kg (183 lb)

Playing career^{1}
Years	Club	Games (Goals)
1967–1968	Richmond	23 (0)
- ^{1} Playing statistics correct to the end of 1968.

Kevin Shinners (born 24 March 1945) is a former Australian rules footballer who played with Richmond in the Victorian Football League (VFL).

Shinners was recruited from Dandenong. He played 17 games for Richmond in the 1967 VFL season, including their semi final win over Carlton, but missed out on participating in the grand final, which they won. He was called up to the seniors just six times in 1968.

He continued at Dandenong after leaving Richmond and also spent some time with Rochester in the Bendigo Football League, winning a Michelsen Medal in 1970.

== Links ==
- Kevin Shinners Profile at Tigerland Archive
