= Rod Watt =

Australian rules footballer

Personal information
- Full name: Rodney Charles Watt
- Born: 2 January 1895; Ascot Vale, Victoria
- Died: 29 May 1967 (aged 72); Heidelberg, Victoria
- Original team: South Bendigo (BFL)
- Height: 173 cm (5 ft 8 in)
- Weight: 68 kg (150 lb)

Playing career^{1}
Years	Club	Games (Goals)
1925–27	Essendon	21 (1)
- ^{1} Playing statistics correct to the end of 1927.

Rodney Charles Watt (2 January 1895 – 29 May 1967) was an Australian rules footballer who played with Essendon in the Victorian Football League (VFL).

Watt's brother Rowley was a dual Essendon premiership player.

== Sources ==
- Cullen, B. (2015) Harder than Football, Slattery Media Group: Melbourne. ISBN 9780992379148.
- Rod Watt's playing statistics from AFL Tables
- Rod Watt at AustralianFootball.com
