= Jonathon Ross (footballer) =

Australian rules footballer, born 1973

Personal information
- Born: 3 November 1973 (age 53)
- Position: Key Position Utility

Playing career^{1}
Years	Club	Games (Goals)
1992–1996	Adelaide Crows	20 (4)
1997	Collingwood	0 (0)
- ^{1} Playing statistics correct to the end of Round 1, 1998.

Jonathon Ross (born 3 November 1973) is a former Australian rules footballer in the Australian Football League. He played with the Adelaide Crows.

A well-built, strong key position player, Jonathon Ross had the potential to go far. However, his career was hampered by knee injuries and off-field drama and after playing 12 games in his debut season (1992) he managed just eight more games in the next four years. He was offered a chance at Collingwood but lost his place for disciplinary reasons.

Ross was sacked by the Magpies after being charged with unlawful assault, being drunk in a public place, four counts of assaulting police and resisting arrest shortly after arriving at the club.

He is the son of former St Kilda player Lester Ross.
