= Bruce Carruthers (footballer) =

Australian rules footballer, born 1903

Personal information
- Full name: Bruce Carruthers
- Born: 18 January 1903; Bendigo, Victoria
- Died: 8 March 1988 (aged 85); Bendigo, Victoria
- Original teams: South Bendigo, Rochester

Playing career^{1}
Years	Club	Games (Goals)
1927–28	Essendon	12 (6)
- ^{1} Playing statistics correct to the end of 1928.

Bruce Carruthers (18 January 1903 – 8 March 1988) was an Australian rules footballer who played with Essendon in the Victorian Football League (VFL).

In 1923, Carruthers was involved in a long drawn out clearance dispute. Carruthers, a South Bendigo player applied for a clearance to Rochester, where he was working, but subsequently withdrew it and South Bendigo played Carruthers and a protest was lodged by Rochester. Rochester lost the appeal and Carruthers was allowed to play with South Bendigo.

Ironically, Carruthers ended up playing with Rochester in 1924 and was their captain-coach in 1925, before returning to Bendigo with work midway through 1925 and played in South Bendigo's 1925 premiership.

In 1926, Carruthers applied for a permit to play with Essendon, after training with them for three weeks, but was refused after he admitted that he had received payment from Richmond a few seasons ago. Carruthers returned to play with South Bendigo in 1926.

Carruthers made his VFL debut for Essendon in 1927 against Footscray in round one and kicked four goals.

In 1930, Carruthers was appointed as captain-coach of Launceston Football Club and coached them from 1930 to 1932.
