= Peter Paterson (footballer, born 1880) =

Scottish footballer

Personal information
- Date of birth: 1880
- Place of birth: Glasgow, Scotland
- Position: Inside forward

Senior career*
Years	Team	Apps	(Gls)
1900–1901	Royal Albert		
1901–1902	Everton	5	(1)
1902–1903	Grimsby Town	2	(0)
- * Club domestic league appearances and goals

Peter Paterson (1880 – after 1902) was a Scottish professional footballer who played as an inside forward.
