= Lester Ross =

Australian rules footballer

Personal information
- Full name: Lester Ross
- Born: 27 August 1936 (age 90)
- Original teams: Prahran, Moe
- Height: 177 cm (5 ft 10 in)
- Weight: 72 kg (159 lb)

Playing career^{1}
Years	Club	Games (Goals)
1959	St Kilda	10 (0)
1961–1962	Norwood	27
1963–1967	South Adelaide	72
1968	Subiaco	1
- ^{1} Playing statistics correct to the end of 1968.

Lester Ross (born 27 August 1936) is a former Australian rules footballer who played with St Kilda in the Victorian Football League (VFL).

Ross, who started his senior football career at Victorian Football Association club Prahran, spent the 1958 season with Moe and won the Latrobe Valley Football League "Best and Fairest" award.

He was granted a clearance to join St Kilda in 1959 and the centreman is credited with having outperformed Footscray's Ted Whitten in his very first game. After playing in the opening ten rounds of the season, Ross was demoted to the seconds, causing a dispute which would see him walk out on the club.

Norwood secured his services in 1961 and he spent two seasons with them, in the South Australian National Football League. In his first season, he finished third in the Magarey Medal, even though he had missed five games.

He played the next five years with South Adelaide, after joining the club in 1963. Playing mostly as a half forward flanker, he was a good performer for South Adelaide and was a member of their 1964 premiership team.

His final destination was Subiaco in Western Australia but he played only one senior game. After his debut, Ross seriously injured his arm when he unwittingly smashed it through a window. The injury required 60 stitches and ended his career.

Ross had sons who were also good footballers; Lester junior who played with Norwood and Jonathon who played at both Norwood and Adelaide.
