= Peter Paterson (footballer, born 1916) =

Australian rules footballer, born 1916

Personal information
- Full name: Peter George Paterson
- Born: 27 July 1916; Boort, Victoria
- Died: 8 June 1968 (aged 51); Hastings, Victoria
- Original teams: Barham F.C., Rochester F.C.
- Height: 185 cm (6 ft 1 in)
- Weight: 79 kg (174 lb)

Playing career^{1}
Years	Club	Games (Goals)
1938–39, 1945	Essendon	9 (5)
- ^{1} Playing statistics correct to the end of 1945.

Peter George Paterson (27 July 1916 – 8 June 1968) was an Australian rules footballer who played with Essendon in the Victorian Football League (VFL).

== Family ==
The son of George Bell Paterson (1877–), and Helen Jane Crichton Paterson (1879–1966), née Berry, Peter George Paterson was born at Boort, Victoria on 27 July 1916.

He married Phyllis Ruth Patrick (1921–1981) on 12 December 1942.

== Football ==
=== Essendon (VFL) ===
Paterson was recruited from Rochester via Barham and played with Essendon in 1938, 1939 and 1945.

=== Coburg (VFA) ===
He transferred from Essendon to Coburg without a clearance from Essendon, and was granted a permit to play by the VFA on 1 August 1945.

== Death ==
He died at Hastings, Victoria on 8 June 1968.
