= List of Sydney Swans players =

This is a list of Sydney Swans players who have made one or more appearance in the Australian Football League, known as the Victorian Football League until 1990. The Sydney Swans were previously known as South Melbourne until their relocation in 1982.

== South Melbourne/Sydney Swans players ==
Key
Order	Players are listed in order of debut
Seasons	Includes Sydney only careers and spans from the season of the player's debut to the year in which they played their final game for Sydney
Debut	Debuts are for VFL/AFL regular season and finals series matches only
Games	Statistics are for VFL/AFL regular season and finals series matches only and are correct to the end of the 2025 season.
Goals	Statistics are for VFL/AFL regular season and finals series matches only and are correct to the end of the 2025 season.
^{^}	Currently listed players
^{†}	Inducted into the Australian Football Hall of Fame

=== 1890s ===
Order	Name	Seasons	Debut	Games	Goals
1	Dave Adamson	1897–1903	round 1, 1897	90	11
2	Jack Adamson	1897–1898	round 1, 1897	3	0
3	Bill Blackwood	1897	round 1, 1897	13	11
4	Allen Burns	1897–1898, 1901–1903	round 1, 1897	40	23
5	Jack Deas	1897	round 1, 1897	2	0
6	Bill Fraser	1897–1904	round 1, 1897	88	18
7	Dick Gibson	1897–1898	round 1, 1897	29	9
8	Tom Gilligan	1897–1899	round 1, 1897	42	26
9	Herb Howson	1897–1908	round 1, 1897	152	2
10	Charlie McCartney	1897	round 1, 1897	13	0
11	Dinny McKay	1897	round 1, 1897	14	14
12	Michael O'Gorman	1897–1898	round 1, 1897	12	14
13	Jim O'Hara	1897, 1899–1901	round 1, 1897	37	1
14	Mick Pleass	1897–1904	round 1, 1897	109	41
15	Harry Purdy	1897–1901	round 1, 1897	72	16
16	Fred Sigmont	1897	round 1, 1897	6	0
17	Jack Southern	1897–1899	round 1, 1897	31	3
18	Archie Swannie	1897	round 1, 1897	13	4
19	Fred Waugh	1897, 1900	round 1, 1897	22	3
20	Bill Windley	1897–1905	round 1, 1897	129	36
21	Frank O'Hara	1897–1901	round 2, 1897	60	1
22	Alb Thomas	1897	round 2, 1897	1	0
23	Eddie Toms	1897	round 2, 1897	7	0
24	George Williamson	1897–1898	round 2, 1897	12	0
25	Dick Doran	1897	round 6, 1897	9	0
26	Horrie Lyons	1897	round 6, 1897	5	2
27	Jack Fleming	1897–1898	round 10, 1897	12	0
28	George Davidson	1897–1900	round 12, 1897	37	0
29	Eddie Brown	1898	round 1, 1898	5	1
30	Charlie Colgan	1898–1901	round 1, 1898	37	43
31	George Cornelius	1898	round 1, 1898	16	2
32	Johnny Davis	1898–1899	round 1, 1898	10	6
33	Henri Jeanneret	1898–1903	round 1, 1898	75	12
34	Billy Kenny	1898	round 1, 1898	2	0
35	George Sparrow	1898	round 1, 1898	14	2
36	Albert Trim	1898–1901	round 1, 1898	65	0
37	Jim Jolly	1898	round 3, 1898	7	0
38	Artie Machin	1898	round 3, 1898	3	0
39	Jason Ralph	1898	round 6, 1898	5	0
40	John McDermott	1898	round 8, 1898	5	3
41	Bob O'Donnell	1898	round 8, 1898	3	2
42	Joe Strong	1898	round 10, 1898	2	0
43	Arch McNair	1898–1899	round 11, 1898	13	0
44	Tom Smith	1898	round 11, 1898	2	0
45	Val Robertson	1898–1899	round 12, 1898	7	0
46	Harry Gardner	1898, 1900	round 13, 1898	5	0
47	George Taylor	1898	round 13, 1898	1	0
48	Joe Chandler	1898	round 14, 1898	3	2
49	Jim McArthur	1898	round 14, 1898	1	0
50	Jack O'Hara	1898	round 15, 1898	2	1
51	Warwick Armstrong	1898–1900	round 17, 1898	16	18
52	Jack Cockbill	1899	round 1, 1899	3	0
53	Joe Garbutt	1899–1902	round 1, 1899	39	10
54	Charlie Goding	1899–1904	round 1, 1899	63	60
55	Harry Lampe	1899–1907	round 1, 1899	135	57
56	Arthur Nickless	1899	round 1, 1899	1	0
57	Jack Incoll	1899	round 3, 1899	4	3
58	Jimmy Paterson	1899	round 4, 1899	1	0
59	Dave Hutchison	1899	round 5, 1899	2	0
60	Frank Arnold	1899	round 7, 1899	9	0
61	Jim Cullen	1899	round 8, 1899	1	0
62	Artie Henley	1899	round 9, 1899	10	1
63	Bernie Fritsch	1899	round 12, 1899	1	1
64	Charlie James	1899–1904	round 12, 1899	78	13
65	Henry Howson	1899	round 13, 1899	2	0
66	Joe Lowrey	1899	round 16, 1899	1	0
67	Bob Bryce	1899–1900	round 17, 1899	5	1

=== 1900s ===
Order	Name	Seasons	Debut	Games	Goals
68	Jack Davidson	1900	round 1, 1900	7	0
69	Martin Gullan	1900	round 1, 1900	2	1
70	Charlie Robertson	1900–1901	round 1, 1900	6	0
71	Alby Rose	1900–1902	round 1, 1900	12	11
72	Les Vernon	1900–1901	round 1, 1900	19	0
73	Sam Brockwell	1900	round 2, 1900	15	4
74	Jim Williamson	1900–1902	round 5, 1900	30	0
75	Tom Wenborn	1900–1901, 1904–1906	round 6, 1900	56	0
76	Bert Williams	1900	round 8, 1900	7	1
77	Alf Chapman	1900	round 9, 1900	2	0
78	Fred Monkhouse	1900	round 12, 1900	2	1
79	Ernie Nelson	1900	round 12, 1900	7	0
80	Bill Moodie	1900	round 13, 1900	5	0
81	Mike O'Hehir	1900–1901	round 13, 1900	18	2
82	Tim McKeegan	1900	round 14, 1900	2	0
83	Alf Dowsing	1900–1902	round 16, 1900	9	2
84	Dave Powell	1901–1903	round 1, 1901	27	13
85	Arthur Smith	1901	round 1, 1901	9	0
86	Frank Worroll	1901–1903	round 1, 1901	31	12
87	Norm Rippon	1901–1904	round 2, 1901	36	2
88	Harold Bower	1901–1902	round 7, 1901	13	0
89	Paul Cullen	1901	round 7, 1901	1	0
90	Bill O'Hara	1901	round 9, 1901	5	2
91	Artie Hollis	1901	round 12, 1901	4	0
92	Lou Jackson	1901–1902	round 15, 1901	8	1
93	Bill Scott	1901–1906	round 15, 1901	61	26
94	Ted Alley	1902–1903	round 1, 1902	16	2
95	Henry Hammond	1902	round 1, 1902	2	0
96	Jack Hassett	1902–1905	round 1, 1902	38	22
97	Otto Kelly	1902	round 1, 1902	16	0
98	Len Smith	1902	round 1, 1902	1	0
99	Tom Fogarty	1902–1906	round 2, 1902	66	20
100	Harvey Kelly	1902, 1913–1914	round 2, 1902	49	52
101	Jim King	1902–1903	round 2, 1902	15	0
102	Arthur Adamson	1902–1903	round 4, 1902	28	0
103	Alec Wallace	1902	round 4, 1902	2	0
104	Jim Stanworth	1902	round 5, 1902	1	0
105	Bill Fahey	1902	round 10, 1902	3	1
106	Jack McDonough	1902–1903	round 10, 1902	21	3
107	Johnny Cormick	1902–1903	round 12, 1902	5	3
108	Bill Hickey	1902–1905	round 13, 1902	45	1
109	Ernie McDougall	1902–1903	round 15, 1902	4	3
110	John Fogarty	1902	round 16, 1902	1	0
111	Bill Johnson	1902–1904	round 16, 1902	24	7
112	Charlie Haigbloom	1902, 1904	round 17, 1902	6	1
113	Billy Gent	1903–1904, 1906–1908	round 1, 1903	62	31
114	Chris Richards	1903	round 1, 1903	1	1
115	Harold Rippon	1903	round 1, 1903	5	0
116	Jack Todd	1903	round 1, 1903	7	0
117	Joe Canavan	1903	round 2, 1903	8	7
118	Ollie McKelson	1903	round 3, 1903	1	0
119	Harry Guy	1903	round 4, 1903	4	0
120	Joe Littler	1903	round 6, 1903	10	9
121	Billy McGee	1903–1906	round 6, 1903	51	29
122	Joe Boles	1903	round 7, 1903	1	1
123	Ned Baptiste	1903	round 8, 1903	7	0
124	Charlie Butler	1903–1904	round 12, 1903	6	0
125	Charlie West	1903	round 13, 1903	3	0
126	John McCashney	1903	round 15, 1903	2	0
127	Charles Bourne	1903	round 16, 1903	1	0
128	Archie Butler	1903	round 16, 1903	2	0
129	Jim Cameron	1903–1911	round 16, 1903	117	43
130	Will Newbould	1903	round 16, 1903	1	0
131	Joe Fox	1903	round 17, 1903	1	0
132	Len Incigneri	1903, 1905	round 17, 1903	2	0
133	Ossie O'Connell	1903	round 17, 1903	1	1
134	Herb Bruton	1904	round 1, 1904	2	0
135	Harry Gibson	1904–1906	round 1, 1904	41	11
136	Leslie Hope	1904	round 1, 1904	1	0
137	Edmund Johnson	1904	round 1, 1904	1	0
138	Dick McCabe	1904–1907	round 1, 1904	51	0
139	Dave McColl	1904	round 1, 1904	5	0
140	Charles Clements	1904–1905	round 2, 1904	32	68
141	Bert Sharpe	1904–1905	round 3, 1904	17	17
142	Bill Griffiths	1904–1905	round 3, 1905	9	0
143	Jim Schellnack	1904	round 5, 1904	7	6
144	Robert Daykin	1904	round 9, 1904	1	0
145	Les Weate	1904–1905, 1907	round 9, 1904	4	1
146	Bill Strang	1904–1907, 1913	round 10, 1904	69	80
147	Henry Morley Kidgell	1904	round 11, 1904	5	0
148	Tom Hawking	1904	round 13, 1904	1	0
149	John Catarinich	1904–1905	round 14, 1904	7	0
150	Peter McCann	1904	round 15, 1904	1	0
151	Artie Percy	1904	round 15, 1904	2	0
152	Syd Wright	1904	round 15, 1904	3	0
153	Tom Darcy	1904	round 17, 1904	1	0
154	Con Hogan	1904	round 17, 1904	1	0
155	Percy Abercrombie	1905	round 1, 1905	12	0
156	Dick Casey	1905–1912	round 1, 1905	112	93
157	Bill Dolphin	1905–1911	round 1, 1905	100	0
158	Alf Pitman	1905	round 1, 1905	7	3
159	Archie Pratt	1905	round 1, 1905	7	3
160	Sydney Sykes	1905–1906	round 1, 1905	7	5
161	Fred O'Brien	1905	round 2, 1905	2	1
162	Len Coffey	1905	round 6, 1905	1	0
163	Joe Fogarty	1905	round 8, 1905	9	5
164	Wal Smallhorn	1905–1906	round 9, 1905	4	0
165	Harry Bromley	1905	round 11, 1905	1	0
166	Bill Thomas	1905–1913	round 12, 1905	135	2
167	Andy McDonell	1905–1906	round 14, 1905	6	1
168	Ernie Blencowe	1905–1906	round 15, 1905	7	0
169	Charlie Cameron	1905	round 17, 1905	1	0
170	Des Griffin	1905	round 17, 1905	1	0
171	Fred Pitt	1905	round 17, 1905	1	0
172	Peter Bourke	1906–1907	round 1, 1906	17	8
173	Teddy Buist	1906–1907	round 1, 1906	12	0
174	Alex Kerr	1906–1911	round 1, 1906	74	57
175	Len Mortimer	1906–1915	round 1, 1906	153	289
176	Martin Pash	1906	round 1, 1906	7	8
177	Charlie Ricketts	1906–1912	round 1, 1906	82	47
178	Ted Wade	1906–1910	round 1, 1906	60	3
179	Tom Pettit	1906	round 3, 1906	1	0
180	Bob Franklin	1906	round 4, 1906	5	1
181	Bert Franks	1906–1910, 1912–1913	round 4, 1906	99	63
182	Dick Bliss	1906	round 7, 1906	1	0
183	George Curran	1906–1907	round 10, 1906	5	1
184	Jim Smith	1906	round 11, 1906	3	1
185	George Anderson	1906–1908	round 12, 1906	42	0
186	Bill Clarke	1906	round 15, 1906	1	0
187	Ed Harrison	1906, 1908–1909	round 15, 1906	7	1
188	Vic Belcher†	1907–1915, 1917–1920	round 1, 1907	226	62
189	Bill Goddard	1907–1908	round 1, 1907	28	17
190	Billy Moxham	1907–1910	round 1, 1907	29	2
191	Wally Roach	1907	round 1, 1907	1	0
192	Phonse Wood	1907–1908	round 1, 1907	30	0
193	Bert Atkins	1907–1908	round 2, 1907	32	0
194	Bill Kerr	1907	round 2, 1907	15	8
195	Lindsay Maine	1907–1908	round 2, 1907	16	0
196	Johnny Jackson	1907	round 3, 1907	7	2
197	Horrie Drane	1907–1909	round 5, 1907	18	1
198	Hughie Callan	1907–1910	round 6, 1907	36	17
199	Jack Main	1907	round 8, 1907	1	1
200	Harry Wilson	1907–1908	round 9, 1907	10	2
201	Jim Lacey	1907	round 16, 1907	1	0
202	Tom Grimshaw	1908–1912	round 1, 1908	85	0
203	Arthur Hiskins	1908–1915, 1919–1923	round 1, 1908	185	56
204	Reuben Holland	1908	round 1, 1908	1	1
205	Jack Jones	1908–1910	round 1, 1908	15	9
206	Henry Paternoster	1908	round 2, 1908	2	0
207	Dave Bowen	1908	round 3, 1908	1	0
208	Toner Hosking	1908, 1910	round 3, 1908	9	1
209	Charles Millsom	1908	round 3, 1908	1	0
210	Jack Turnbull	1908	round 6, 1908	12	0
211	Tom Clancy	1908	round 7, 1908	1	0
212	John Roberts	1908	round 8, 1908	2	0
213	Joe Larkin	1908	round 11, 1908	2	0
214	Des Baird	1908–1909	round 13, 1908	6	0
215	Alf Gough	1908–1911, 1915	round 17, 1908	63	47
216	George Bower	1909–1914	round 1, 1909	75	11
217	Jim Caldwell	1909–1915, 1917–1919	round 1, 1909	155	34
218	Bob Deas	1909–1915, 1917	round 1, 1909	111	73
219	Herbert Moore	1909	round 1, 1909	1	0
220	Jack Scobie	1909–1913	round 1, 1909	75	4
221	Dave Barry	1909–1910	round 2, 1909	24	3
222	Jack Richardson	1909	round 7, 1909	1	0
223	Alan Pentland	1909–1912	round 8, 1909	53	0
224	Bert Streckfuss	1909–1910	round 17, 1909	18	5

=== 1910s ===
Order	Name	Seasons	Debut	Games	Goals
225	Jack Walsh	1910–1912	round 1, 1910	29	0
226	Fred Carpenter	1910–1913, 1919–1920	round 2, 1910	52	68
227	Les Charge	1910–1915	round 2, 1910	65	50
228	Jim Lynch	1910	round 2, 1910	1	0
229	Joe Prince	1910–1915, 1917–1918	round 3, 1910	103	5
230	Francis Biehl	1910	round 7, 1910	3	1
231	Alby Kirchner	1910	round 8, 1910	6	0
232	Bruce Sloss	1910–1914	round 10, 1910	81	44
233	Arthur Punshon	1910–1911	round 17, 1910	11	2
234	Tom Strownix	1911	round 1, 1911	14	1
235	Ben Main	1911	round 3, 1911	1	0
236	Mark Tandy†	1911–1915, 1917–1926	round 3, 1911	207	47
237	Fred Fielding	1911	round 5, 1911	1	0
238	Herbert Milne	1911–1912	round 6, 1911	31	14
239	Ernie George	1911	round 10, 1911	1	0
240	George Deas	1911–1912	round 18, 1911	4	3
241	Dick Mullaly	1912–1915, 1917	round 1, 1912	69	12
242	Les Rusich	1912–1915	round 2, 1912	54	33
243	Frank Comer	1912	round 5, 1912	2	0
244	Harry Saltau	1912–1915	round 5, 1912	50	0
245	Les Abbott	1912	round 14, 1912	3	0
246	Charlie Fincher	1913	round 1, 1913	9	5
247	Dick Fitzgerald	1913	round 1, 1913	2	0
248	Stan Hiskins	1913–1914, 1919–1921	round 1, 1913	66	34
249	Arthur Rademacher	1913–1915, 1917–1920	round 1, 1913	101	0
250	Horrie Webster	1913	round 1, 1913	17	13
251	Paddy Abbott	1913	round 2, 1913	4	0
252	Bill Eastick	1913–1914	round 2, 1913	15	2
253	Charlie Wolfe	1913	round 2, 1913	6	2
254	Jack Freeman	1913–1914	round 8, 1913	22	39
255	Marshall Caffyn	1913	round 15, 1913	1	0
256	Harold Bennett	1914	round 1, 1914	7	0
257	Ben Hair	1914–1915, 1917–1918	round 1, 1914	43	3
258	Harry Morgan	1914–1915, 1917–1918	round 1, 1914	60	100
259	Alan O'Donoghue	1914–1915, 1917–1918	round 3, 1914	44	15
260	Claude Thomas	1914–1915	round 3, 1914	13	0
261	Bill Hennington	1914	round 4, 1914	6	0
262	George Payne	1914–1915, 1917	round 5, 1914	26	14
263	Percy Jackson	1914	round 7, 1914	8	5
264	Charlie Jones	1914–1915	round 9, 1914	7	1
265	Jack O'Brien	1914	round 9, 1914	2	2
266	Wally Laidlaw	1914, 1919	round 10, 1914	3	0
267	Herb Matthews, Sr.	1914, 1923–1924	round 10, 1914	32	27
268	Tom Bollard	1914–1915, 1917	round 13, 1914	24	0
269	Herb Joolen	1914	round 16, 1914	1	1
270	Norm Bradford	1915	round 1, 1915	7	9
271	Jim Stewart	1915, 1917, 1919–1920	round 1, 1915	29	15
272	Carl Willis	1915, 1920–1921	round 1, 1915	29	18
273	Jock Doherty	1915, 1917–1920, 1922	round 2, 1915	67	37
274	Pat Farnan	1915	round 2, 1915	2	1
275	Stan Wootton	1915, 1920–1922	round 2, 1915	41	45
276	Artie Adams	1915	round 3, 1915	3	0
277	Jack P. Howell	1915, 1917–1918	round 3, 1915	40	22
278	Bill Daly	1915, 1917–1919	round 5, 1915	59	1
279	Les Turner	1915	round 16, 1915	1	1
280	Alf Boyce	1915, 1917–1918	round 17, 1915	18	22
281	Harry Purdy	1917, 1919	round 1, 1917	9	6
282	Harold Robertson	1917–1921, 1923	round 1, 1917	64	93
283	Gerald P. Ryan	1917–1918	round 1, 1917	26	37
284	Phil Skehan	1917–1919	round 1, 1917	38	2
285	Sydney Strong	1917	round 1, 1917	2	0
286	George Moloney, Sr.	1917	round 2, 1917	2	0
287	Jim Ashton	1917	round 3, 1917	4	0
288	Dick Hutchinson	1917	round 3, 1917	11	17
289	Mal Lowrie	1917	round 4, 1917	4	3
290	Jack Brennan	1917–1918	round 5, 1917	18	2
291	Harry Lakin	1917, 1920	round 7, 1917	3	1
292	Artie Wood	1917–1923	round 7, 1917	97	14
293	Wal Jenkins	1917	round 13, 1917	2	0
294	Ernie Barber	1918–1919	round 1, 1918	21	28
295	Jim Graham	1918	round 1, 1918	15	0
296	Tom O'Halloran	1918–1921	round 1, 1918	62	12
297	Reg Sampson	1918–1921	round 1, 1918	25	3
298	Chip Turner	1918–1922	round 1, 1918	66	1
299	Tammy Hynes	1918–1920, 1922–1924	round 2, 1918	57	4
300	Frank Magill	1918	round 4, 1918	2	0
301	Frank Cummins	1918	round 5, 1918	1	0
302	Chris Laird	1918–1922	round 5, 1918	59	99
303	Harry Bulpit	1918–1919	round 7, 1918	6	3
304	Mick Ryan	1918	round 7, 1918	1	0
305	Bill Talbot	1918	round 13, 1918	2	0
306	Harry Froud	1919	round 1, 1919	10	4
307	Norm Lugg	1919–1920	round 1, 1919	27	10
308	Jim Makin	1919, 1921–1922	round 1, 1919	30	5
309	Bill Pearson	1919–1920	round 1, 1919	12	9
310	Bill Kenny	1919	round 8, 1919	2	0
311	Harry Brereton	1919–1920, 1922	round 11, 1919	17	52
312	Gladstone Power	1919–1921	round 11, 1919	23	21
313	Fred Fleiter	1919–1925	round 15, 1919	71	11

=== 1920s ===
Order	Name	Seasons	Debut	Games	Goals
314	Reg Seedsman	1920–1921	round 1, 1920	31	0
315	Vic Smith	1920	round 2, 1920	12	2
316	Bobby Allison	1920–1921, 1923–1926	round 5, 1920	54	81
317	Paddy Scanlan	1920–1926	round 6, 1920	100	49
318	Roy Reardon	1920–1921	round 8, 1920	13	11
319	Vernon Lanigan	1920–1921	round 18, 1920	3	0
320	Roy Cazaly†	1921–1924, 1926–1927	round 1, 1921	99	128
321	Edwin Marsh	1921	round 1, 1921	2	3
322	Tom Nadort	1921	round 1, 1921	16	1
323	Alex Nicholson	1921–1922	round 1, 1921	11	1
324	Frank Laird	1921–1925	round 3, 1921	66	21
325	Bert Sutton	1921, 1923–1924	round 3, 1921	49	34
326	Leon Beer	1921–1923	round 4, 1921	15	2
327	Bobby Gibb	1921	round 4, 1921	4	0
328	Bob McDonald	1921–1924	round 4, 1921	33	4
329	John Mitchell	1921	round 4, 1921	1	0
330	Jimmy Rodgers	1921	round 4, 1921	11	1
331	Martin Brown	1921–1925, 1927–1928	round 5, 1921	73	38
332	Bert Lawrence	1921, 1925	round 5, 1921	7	8
333	Harry Davenport	1921	round 18, 1921	1	0
334	Bert Russell	1921, 1923, 1925	round 18, 1921	6	5
335	Sid Conlon	1922	round 1, 1922	4	3
336	Billy Gambetta	1922	round 1, 1922	4	7
337	Bill Gunn, Sr.	1922	round 1, 1922	10	1
338	Tommy Law	1922	round 1, 1922	2	1
339	Bill Peters	1922	round 1, 1922	4	0
340	Frank Ross	1922–1924	round 1, 1922	32	2
341	Roy Bence	1922	round 2, 1922	15	6
342	Maurie Connell	1922	round 2, 1922	1	0
343	Clarrie Woodfield	1922	round 2, 1922	1	0
344	Harold Alexander	1922–1926	round 3, 1922	70	40
345	Wal Matthews	1922–1924	round 3, 1922	22	7
346	Jim Cullum	1922	round 4, 1922	2	0
347	Basil Smith	1922	round 4, 1922	6	5
348	Arthur Hando	1922–1924	round 5, 1922	45	0
349	Jack O'Connell	1922–1924	round 7, 1922	42	4
350	Don Templeton	1922	round 8, 1922	1	0
351	Bill Condon	1923–1927	round 1, 1923	72	32
352	Syd James	1923	round 1, 1923	8	3
353	Tom Joyce	1923–1925	round 1, 1923	28	6
354	Joe Scanlan	1923–1931	round 1, 1923	148	12
355	Les Woodfield	1923–1927	round 1, 1923	76	11
356	Bill Roberts	1923	round 2, 1923	1	1
357	Billy Billett	1923	round 4, 1923	3	4
358	Ted Johnson	1923–1931	round 4, 1923	136	385
359	Charlie Nicholls	1923–1927	round 15, 1923	56	10
360	Harold Mahony	1924–1926	round 1, 1924	18	14
361	Merv Scanlan	1924	round 1, 1924	2	0
362	Charles McDonald	1924–1928	round 2, 1924	57	5
363	Ted Sivies	1924	round 4, 1924	1	0
364	Ted O'Meara	1924–1926	round 10, 1924	13	15
365	Maurie De Araugo	1924	round 15, 1924	1	0
366	Phil Brooks	1924	round 18, 1924	2	1
367	Jim Sutherland	1924	round 18, 1924	1	0
368	Jacky Harris	1924–1925	semi final, 1924	6	10
369	Gil Miller	1924	semi final, 1924	1	1
370	Bill Freyer	1925	round 1, 1925	12	0
371	Syd Hogg	1925–1930	round 1, 1925	54	6
372	David Hume	1925	round 1, 1925	1	1
373	Alby Jacobsen	1925, 1927–1928	round 1, 1925	15	2
374	Charlie Stanbridge	1925–1929	round 1, 1925	69	12
375	Peter Reville	1925–1934	round 2, 1925	156	207
376	George Waterhouse	1925	round 3, 1925	2	1
377	Harry Neill	1925	round 4, 1925	2	0
378	George Stewart	1925	round 5, 1925	13	1
379	Bill Browne	1925	round 6, 1925	2	2
380	Charlie Anderson	1925–1926	round 7, 1925	11	2
381	Jack Barnes	1925, 1927–1929	round 7, 1925	41	71
382	Fred Condon	1925–1926	round 7, 1925	10	4
383	Fred Wimbridge	1925	round 9, 1925	8	12
384	Arthur Barlow	1925–1928	round 13, 1925	40	10
385	Albert Daly	1925	round 15, 1925	1	0
386	Paul Cameron	1926, 1928	round 1, 1926	22	35
387	Harry Clarke	1926–1935	round 1, 1926	147	33
388	Hec McKay	1926–1935	round 1, 1926	152	1
389	Bill Berryman	1926–1928	round 4, 1926	47	0
390	Charlie Pannam	1926–1928	round 4, 1926	45	31
391	Danny Wheelahan	1926–1930	round 5, 1926	51	4
392	Fred Ryder	1926	round 7, 1926	1	0
393	Jack Ferguson	1926–1928	round 10, 1926	20	6
394	Tom Drummond	1926	round 13, 1926	5	1
395	John Elmer	1926	round 16, 1926	1	1
396	Bert Avery	1927–1930	round 1, 1927	25	5
397	Jack Petchell	1927–1929	round 1, 1927	35	36
398	Cecil Pettiona	1927–1934	round 1, 1927	78	15
399	Ted Bourke	1927	round 2, 1927	6	1
400	Austin Robertson, Sr.	1927–1937	round 3, 1927	154	251
401	Rolland Fairley	1927–1928	round 4, 1927	10	3
402	Len Thomas	1927–1934, 1936–1938	round 6, 1927	187	54
403	Tom McMahon	1927, 1930–1931	round 18, 1927	19	5
404	Terry Brain	1928–1937	round 1, 1928	141	198
405	Fred Kennett	1928	round 1, 1928	1	0
406	Cyril Powell	1928–1929	round 1, 1928	20	0
407	George Condon	1928, 1930	round 2, 1928	7	0
408	Bill Mannion	1928	round 3, 1928	1	0
409	Pat Tebble	1928	round 4, 1928	3	0
410	Jim Crossan	1928	round 5, 1928	4	4
411	Joe Poulter	1928–1929, 1931	round 5, 1928	37	23
412	Les Bollman	1928–1929	round 8, 1928	17	0
413	Bill Churchill	1928–1929	round 9, 1928	17	19
414	Len Hogg	1928–1929	round 10, 1928	16	30
415	Tommy Murphy	1928	round 11, 1928	3	0
416	Jack O'Brien	1928–1930	round 18, 1928	13	4
417	Jack Richardson	1928–1931	round 18, 1928	34	6
418	Ron Hillis	1929–1937	round 1, 1929	137	16
419	Hugh McLaughlin, Sr.	1929–1934	round 1, 1929	96	0
420	Bill O'Connor	1929	round 1, 1929	1	0
421	Eric Poole	1929	round 1, 1929	4	0
422	Eddie Rosenbrock	1929–1930	round 1, 1929	4	0
423	Max Scott	1929, 1931	round 2, 1929	19	0
424	Jack Twyford	1929	round 2, 1929	2	2
425	Jim Forbes	1929	round 3, 1929	1	0
426	Rupe Hutton	1929	round 3, 1929	7	2
427	Norm Le Brun	1929	round 4, 1929	3	2
428	Ted Wildie	1929	round 8, 1929	11	0
429	Dinny Fagan	1929–1931	round 15, 1929	19	0

=== 1930s ===
Order	Name	Seasons	Debut	Games	Goals
429	Tasman Knight	1930	round 1, 1930	4	0
430	Rod Leffanue	1930–1932	round 1, 1930	12	14
431	Bob Pratt†	1930–1939, 1946	round 1, 1930	158	681
432	Ron Shapter	1930–1931	round 1, 1930	26	14
433	Dave Coutts	1930	round 2, 1930	5	0
434	Bill Jordan	1930	round 3, 1930	3	1
435	Bill O'Brien	1930	round 3, 1930	2	0
436	Charlie Troughton	1930	round 3, 1930	7	6
437	Jack Austin	1930–1938	round 4, 1930	140	19
438	Reg Bennett	1930–1932	round 6, 1930	39	5
439	Jack Shelton	1930	round 7, 1930	7	2
440	Ron Martin	1930	round 9, 1930	4	3
441	Martin Wheelahan	1930–1931	round 12, 1930	11	5
442	Stan Lawler	1930–1931	round 17, 1930	2	6
443	Alf Callick	1930	round 18, 1930	1	2
444	Roy Cassidy	1930	round 18, 1930	1	0
445	Norm McPherson	1931–1932	round 1, 1931	9	0
446	Jack Wade	1931–1933	round 1, 1931	26	2
447	Jack Patterson	1931	round 2, 1931	14	14
448	Cyril McNamara	1931	round 3, 1931	3	0
449	Clem Fisher	1931–1932	round 4, 1931	14	4
450	Len Milburn	1931	round 4, 1931	12	3
451	Jock McKenzie	1931, 1933–1936, 1940	round 7, 1931	55	25
452	Eric Harrower	1931	round 12, 1931	3	0
453	Reg Thomas	1931–1932, 1936	round 16, 1931	23	16
454	Keith Simpson	1931	round 15, 1931	2	0
455	Art Mietzcke	1931–1933	round 18, 1931	18	8
456	Ken Reynolds	1931	round 18, 1931	1	0
457	Jack Bisset	1932–1936	round 1, 1932	90	9
458	Alick Black	1932	round 1, 1932	1	0
459	Herb Boschen	1932	round 1, 1932	4	0
460	Herbie Matthews†	1932–1945	round 1, 1932	191	17
461	Roy Selleck	1932	round 1, 1932	3	2
462	Bert Beard	1932–1935	round 3, 1932	36	19
463	Dinny Dowd	1932	round 3, 1932	2	0
464	Bill Faul	1932–1938	round 3, 1932	117	2
465	Jock Fahey	1932–1934	round 4, 1932	31	11
466	Johnny Leonard	1932	round 4, 1932	12	17
467	Brighton Diggins	1932–1936	round 7, 1932	65	21
468	Bill Flynn	1932	round 12, 1932	2	0
469	Alan Gilmour	1932–1933	round 12, 1932	10	0
470	Maurie Hearn	1932–1934	round 15, 1932	8	4
471	Joe Cosgriff	1932	round 18, 1932	1	0
472	Ossie Bertram	1933–1934	round 1, 1933	23	43
473	Laurie Nash†	1933–1937, 1945	round 1, 1933	99	246
474	Joe O'Meara	1933–1936	round 1, 1933	47	36
475	Alan Welch	1933–1937	round 1, 1933	49	24
476	John Bowe	1933	round 2, 1933	17	0
477	Frank Davies	1933	round 6, 1933	7	3
478	Wilbur Harris	1933–1941	round 7, 1933	69	19
479	Fred Backway	1933–1934	round 10, 1933	4	2
480	Dinny Kelleher	1933–1936	round 10, 1933	59	14
481	Reg Humphries	1934–1936, 1938–1939	round 3, 1934	68	8
482	Jim Cleary	1934–1948	round 5, 1934	222	6
483	Ian Lee	1934	round 5, 1934	2	0
484	Lin Richards	1934–1936	round 9, 1934	39	0
485	Frank Davies	1934–1936	round 18, 1934	30	15
486	Roy Moore	1935–1939, 1941	round 1, 1935	66	144
487	Jim Reid	1935–1936	round 1, 1935	36	6
488	Syd Dineen	1935–1937	round 3, 1935	28	26
489	Roy McEachen	1935–1936	round 3, 1935	17	1
490	Leo Monaghan	1935	round 3, 1935	2	0
491	Rowley Flynne	1935	round 9, 1935	4	0
492	Lou Gatti	1935	round 9, 1935	4	1
493	Jack Graham	1935–1949	round 15, 1935	227	233
494	Owen Evans	1935–1941	round 16, 1935	64	95
495	Jack George	1936	round 3, 1936	11	1
496	Laurie Leask	1936–1937	round 4, 1936	11	11
497	Rex Ritchie	1936–1942, 1946–1947	round 7, 1936	89	1
498	Tommy Allen	1936–1938	round 10, 1936	26	8
499	Norm Fletcher	1936–1938	round 10, 1936	14	2
500	Maurie Johnson	1936–1937	round 10, 1936	19	27
501	Stan Mullane	1936–1937	round 10, 1936	15	1
502	Charlie Pettiona	1936–1937	round 11, 1936	14	0
503	Keith Smith	1936–1940, 1942–1945	round 12, 1936	93	45
504	Gordon Goldsmith	1936, 1942–1943	round 13, 1936	13	5
505	Alex Mitchell	1936–1940, 1943	round 13, 1936	58	34
506	Reg Richards	1936, 1938–1941	round 13, 1936	117	57
507	George Bryce	1937–1939	round 1, 1937	26	7
508	Jimmy Maher	1937	round 1, 1937	4	3
509	Jack Hacker	1937–1944	round 5, 1937	111	7
510	Alf Hedge	1937–1938	round 5, 1937	16	3
511	Laurie Taylor	1937–1938	round 6, 1937	4	0
512	Percy Ilott	1937	round 7, 1937	7	3
513	Frank Kendrick	1937	round 8, 1937	2	0
514	Sandy Patterson	1937–1938, 1940	round 8, 1937	26	17
515	Ray Gillett	1937, 1939	round 10, 1937	8	0
516	Reg Coyle	1937–1941, 1945	round 12, 1937	62	3
517	Russell McInnes	1937	round 12, 1937	3	0
518	Don Howard	1938	round 1, 1938	6	1
519	Jack Quinn	1938–1940	round 1, 1938	10	8
520	Pat Farrelly	1938	round 2, 1938	6	1
521	Les Dunn	1938	round 3, 1938	1	0
522	Perc Horner	1938	round 3, 1938	1	1
523	Syd Tims	1938–1939	round 3, 1938	19	18
524	Mick Leonard	1938–1940	round 5, 1938	27	9
525	Frank Cook	1938	round 6, 1938	1	1
526	Norm Mason	1938	round 6, 1938	2	0
527	Jim Redstone	1938	round 6, 1938	4	5
528	Gerry Hayes	1938, 1944	round 7, 1938	6	0
529	Joe Meehan	1938	round 8, 1938	2	0
530	Frank Sinclair	1938–1939	round 8, 1938	13	8
531	George Collard	1938–1942	round 12, 1938	56	49
532	Arthur Timms	1938	round 12, 1938	1	1
533	Norm Matthews	1938–1940	round 13, 1938	28	6
534	Tom Purvis	1938	round 15, 1938	3	0
535	Norm Couper	1939–1940	round 1, 1939	12	4
536	Lindsay McNamara	1939–1940	round 1, 1939	4	4
537	Bobby Mullenger	1939–1940, 1946	round 1, 1939	6	1
538	Jack "Basher" Williams	1939–1940, 1942–1946	round 1, 1939	61	3
539	Les Powell	1939	round 2, 1939	1	0
540	Grahame Hall	1939, 1941	round 3, 1939	11	2
541	Clarrie O'Connor	1939	round 3, 1939	5	1
542	Ken Dineen	1939–1941, 1944–1945	round 4, 1939	47	50
543	Brian Kelly	1939–1945	round 5, 1939	92	14
544	Allan Mullenger	1939–1944	round 6, 1939	58	29
545	Lou Reiffel	1939–1941	round 8, 1939	29	55
546	Pat McNamara	1939–1940	round 9, 1939	22	3
547	Ted Whitfield	1939–1941, 1944–1945	round 12, 1939	54	11
548	Harold Traynor	1939–1942	round 13, 1939	37	16
549	Alf Benison	1939–1944	round 15, 1939	42	32
550	Alby Newell	1939	round 15, 1939	2	0

=== 1940s ===
Order	Name	Seasons	Debut	Games	Goals
551	Dick Chirgwin	1940	round 2, 1940	1	0
552	Kevin O'Halloran	1940	round 2, 1940	2	3
553	George Bates	1940	round 3, 1940	3	0
554	Harry Gray	1940	round 3, 1940	9	5
555	Don Grossman	1940–1942, 1944–1947	round 4, 1940	93	32
556	Ian Chinn	1940, 1942	round 6, 1940	17	28
557	Frank Hill	1940, 1945	round 8, 1940	5	0
558	Stan Brown	1940, 1944	round 11, 1940	9	4
559	Jack Fergeus	1940	round 11, 1940	2	1
560	Billy King	1940–1948	round 13, 1940	136	17
561	Howard Jasper	1940–1941, 1946	round 14, 1940	26	3
562	Gordon Hamilton	1940	round 15, 1940	2	0
563	Merv Dudley	1940	round 16, 1940	3	7
564	Arthur Turner	1940, 1942	round 16, 1940	3	0
565	Keith Virtue	1940	round 17, 1940	2	3
566	Keith McNaughton	1940	round 18, 1940	1	0
567	Kevin Barrett	1941	round 1, 1941	4	6
568	Reg Gibson	1941	round 1, 1941	1	0
569	Eric Huxtable	1941–1942	round 1, 1941	22	1
570	Roy Porter	1941, 1945	round 1, 1941	5	1
571	Jeff Grieve	1941	round 2, 1941	11	0
572	Jack Dempsey	1941, 1944–1947	round 3, 1941	45	12
573	Archie Baxter	1941, 1944, 1946	round 4, 1941	23	25
574	Bert Lucas	1941	round 4, 1941	4	6
575	Alan Broadley	1941	round 6, 1941	3	1
576	Jack Mulligan	1941	round 6, 1941	8	17
577	Des Martin	1941–1942	round 7, 1941	10	6
578	Alan McCrory	1941, 1943	round 9, 1941	4	2
579	Alan Linden	1941–1947	round 10, 1941	80	56
580	Syd Young	1941	round 10, 1941	2	0
581	Gordon Sawley	1941	round 11, 1941	7	8
582	Tom Hall	1941	round 15, 1941	2	5
583	Alan Pearsall	1941	round 16, 1941	2	0
584	Eric Sweet	1941, 1943	round 16, 1941	4	2
585	Billy Deans	1941	round 17, 1941	1	1
586	Dave Engellenner	1941–1945	round 17, 1941	30	2
587	Ian Palmer	1941	round 17, 1941	1	0
588	Jack Butcher	1942–1943	round 1, 1942	32	16
589	Terry Cashion†	1942	round 1, 1942	5	5
590	Vic Castles	1942–1947	round 1, 1942	100	139
591	Bill Harwood	1942	round 1, 1942	15	5
592	Tommy Lahiff	1942	round 1, 1942	6	10
593	Lindsay White	1942–1943	round 1, 1942	25	111
594	Tom Crane	1942, 1944–1945	round 5, 1942	7	1
595	Ron Reynolds	1942	round 5, 1942	2	1
596	Lou Mangan	1942, 1944	round 6, 1942	14	4
597	Bill Golding	1942	round 9, 1942	3	3
598	Don Taylor	1942, 1947–1948	round 9, 1942	36	38
599	Len Delfs	1942	round 10, 1942	5	5
600	Laurie Tetley	1942	round 11, 1942	1	0
601	Charlie Culph	1942–1944	round 14, 1942	19	55
602	Bernie Neenan	1942	round 15, 1942	3	2
603	Ron Bywater	1942, 1944, 1946–1950	semi final, 1942	58	39
604	Les Hazelwood	1943–1944	round 1, 1943	9	2
605	Bill Icke	1943	round 1, 1943	2	0
606	Merv Leith	1943, 1946	round 1, 1943	17	10
607	George Moloney, Jr.	1943–1944	round 1, 1943	11	5
608	Fred Patterson	1943	round 1, 1943	1	0
609	Percy Taylor	1943	round 1, 1943	7	16
610	Mel Brown	1943	round 2, 1943	1	0
611	Vin Moloney	1943	round 2, 1943	6	0
612	Wally Southern	1943	round 2, 1943	1	0
613	Pat Leahy	1943, 1945	round 3, 1943	12	14
614	Bill Eastmure	1943	round 5, 1943	4	2
615	Jack Sweet	1943	round 5, 1943	6	0
616	Chris Lamborn	1943	round 7, 1943	1	0
617	Ron Hartridge	1943–1946	round 8, 1943	50	71
618	Max Blumfield	1943–1946	round 9, 1943	21	11
619	Alf Callick	1943, 1946–1950	round 16, 1943	57	9
620	Lou Frost	1944	round 1, 1944	6	0
621	Lyal Keighran	1944, 1947	round 1, 1944	10	6
622	Bob Matlock	1944–1946	round 4, 1944	35	0
623	Jack Sheedy†	1944	round 4, 1944	6	7
624	Jack Oatey†	1944	round 5, 1944	5	4
625	Norm Duncan	1944, 1946	round 6, 1944	19	15
626	Max Rippon	1944	round 7, 1944	4	0
627	Jack Danckert	1944–1945, 1947	round 9, 1944	13	0
628	Joe De Medici	1944	round 11, 1944	5	3
629	Colin Churchett	1944	round 13, 1944	1	0
630	Len O'Shea	1944	round 13, 1944	2	1
631	Pat Grace	1944	round 15, 1944	4	0
632	Jimmy McKnight	1944–1946	round 15, 1944	8	0
633	Pat Bourke	1944, 1946–1949	round 16, 1944	36	0
634	Bill Williams	1945–1951	round 2, 1945	124	180
635	Ron Clegg†	1945–1954, 1956–1960	round 3, 1945	231	156
636	Owen Guyatt	1945	round 8, 1945	4	1
637	George Dougherty	1945	round 9, 1945	10	26
638	Peter Tippett	1945–1947	round 9, 1945	29	2
639	Tom Calder	1945	round 14, 1945	5	0
640	Max Glass	1945	round 14, 1945	3	0
641	Fred Barnes	1946	round 1, 1946	3	2
642	Len Holland	1946–1948	round 1, 1946	33	5
643	Jack Lugg	1946	round 1, 1946	2	0
644	Tom Roulent	1946–1947	round 1, 1946	29	16
645	Neville Stibbard	1946	round 1, 1946	6	2
646	Vic Nankervis	1946	round 2, 1946	4	2
647	George Perrett	1946–1947	round 2, 1946	13	4
648	Wylie Chambers	1946–1950	round 3, 1946	48	7
649	Doug Dowling	1946	round 3, 1946	4	1
650	Larry Spokes	1946–1950	round 3, 1946	61	51
651	Ron Barry	1946–1950	round 4, 1946	54	6
652	Bert Lucas	1946–1950	round 4, 1946	69	31
653	Harry Mears	1946–1948	round 5, 1946	35	47
654	Max Piggott	1946–1947	round 8, 1946	8	21
655	Jack Cotter	1946	round 11, 1946	9	0
656	Ray Jones	1946	round 14, 1946	1	0
657	Ray Thomas	1946–1947	round 14, 1946	2	0
658	George Allen	1946–1948	round 16, 1946	16	11
659	Keith Schaefer	1947–1953	round 1, 1947	102	22
660	Allan Strang	1947–1948	round 1, 1947	15	17
661	George Lucas	1947	round 2, 1947	4	1
662	Jack Mullane	1947–1948	round 2, 1947	12	0
663	Keith Jenkinson	1947	round 3, 1947	8	0
664	Les Williams	1947–1951	round 4, 1947	48	1
665	Frank Brew	1947–1953	round 5, 1947	87	28
666	Bill McTaggart	1947	round 5, 1947	1	0
667	Jack O'Keefe	1947	round 5, 1947	3	6
668	Claude Anderson	1947	round 10, 1947	2	0
669	Len Crane	1947–1950	round 11, 1947	43	1
670	Geoff Driver	1947	round 11, 1947	2	0
671	Ern Parker	1947	round 12, 1947	1	0
672	Frank Prowse	1947	round 19, 1947	1	0
673	George Caris	1948–1950	round 1, 1948	19	1
674	Kevin Collins	1948–1949	round 1, 1948	12	12
675	Erwin Dornau	1948–1952	round 1, 1948	54	8
676	Arthur Fox, Jr.	1948–1950	round 1, 1948	39	14
677	Jack Garrick	1948–1955	round 1, 1948	117	22
678	Reg Harley	1948–1952	round 1, 1948	61	12
679	Vic Hill	1948–1949	round 1, 1948	20	8
680	Stan Bulpit	1948–1950	round 4, 1948	12	8
681	Tom Ryan	1948–1952	round 5, 1948	61	3
682	George Kennedy	1948	round 6, 1948	5	5
683	Jack Eichhorn	1948–1954	round 9, 1948	50	29
684	Harry Simpson	1948–1950	round 13, 1948	16	3
685	Frank Stephens	1948	round 13, 1948	3	3
686	Les Jarry	1948–1949	round 16, 1948	21	10
687	Allan Miller	1948–1951	round 17, 1948	36	48
688	Chester Read	1948–1950	round 19, 1948	16	4
689	Arthur Richardson	1949	round 1, 1949	5	1
690	Dick Jones	1949, 1951	round 2, 1949	19	28
691	Jack Bruce	1949	round 4, 1949	5	2
692	Jim Gull	1949–1950	round 7, 1949	21	20
693	Ron Paez	1949–1953	round 9, 1949	52	51
694	Jim Taylor	1949–1954, 1956–1961	round 13, 1949	153	35
695	Fred Simms	1949–1950	round 17, 1949	4	0
696	Syd Davis	1949–1950	round 19, 1949	4	0

=== 1950s ===
Order	Name	Seasons	Debut	Games	Goals
697	Bob Giles	1950, 1952–1955	round 1, 1950	67	2
698	Gordon Lane	1950–1952	round 1, 1950	47	94
699	Mick Sibun	1950–1956	round 1, 1950	111	88
700	Don Scott	1950–1954	round 3, 1950	83	58
701	Kevin Hilet	1950–1954	round 5, 1950	65	1
702	Ernie Collihole	1950–1951	round 10, 1950	17	0
703	Brian McDonald	1950–1951	round 10, 1950	11	6
704	Urban Duniam	1950	round 13, 1950	1	0
705	Bob Trainer	1950	round 13, 1950	3	3
706	Frank Palmer	1950	round 14, 1950	2	1
707	Reg Goodes	1950	round 18, 1950	1	0
708	Noel Rohleder	1950	round 18, 1950	1	1
709	Ian Gillett	1951–1958	round 1, 1951	135	112
710	Fred Goldsmith	1951–1959	round 1, 1951	119	107
711	Eddie Lane	1951–1956	round 1, 1951	96	130
712	Bruce Murray	1951–1954	round 1, 1951	44	6
713	Llew Owens	1951	round 1, 1951	2	1
714	Ron Walker	1951	round 1, 1951	2	0
715	Paddy Deagan	1951–1954	round 2, 1951	48	26
716	Keith McGuinness	1951	round 2, 1951	2	0
717	Harry Moore	1951	round 2, 1951	13	0
718	Jeff Patterson	1951–1952	round 3, 1951	20	2
719	Ron Digney	1951–1953	round 8, 1951	9	2
720	Keith Browning	1951–1954	round 10, 1951	53	4
721	Stan Smith	1951–1954	round 10, 1951	26	0
722	Jim Dorgan	1951–1958	round 13, 1951	102	2
723	Brian Clegg	1951	round 17, 1951	2	0
724	Bill Gunn	1952–1959	round 1, 1952	104	101
725	Marty Lynch	1952	round 1, 1952	8	11
726	Bill Nolan	1952–1955	round 8, 1952	19	14
727	Don Earl	1952–1955	round 9, 1952	15	0
728	Harold Rosewarne	1952–1954	round 16, 1952	12	2
729	Lindsay Green	1952, 1954	round 19, 1952	4	1
730	Roy Cullinan	1953	round 1, 1953	2	0
731	Nick Gelavis	1953–1954	round 1, 1953	15	16
732	Alan McPherson	1953–1954	round 1, 1953	8	12
733	Leo O'Halloran	1953	round 2, 1953	9	11
734	Ray Preston	1953	round 2, 1953	7	0
735	John Svenson	1953, 1957–1959	round 2, 1953	36	16
736	Ritchie Green	1953	round 5, 1953	2	0
737	Gerry McDonald	1953–1956	round 5, 1953	36	0
738	Dave Donaldson	1953–1954	round 7, 1953	6	0
739	Don Keyter	1953–1958	round 8, 1953	86	81
740	Jack Stevens	1953	round 12, 1953	3	1
741	Ron Taylor	1953–1956	round 12, 1953	22	13
742	Pat Hogan	1953–1954	round 15, 1953	10	6
743	Maurie Lyon	1953	round 15, 1953	4	0
744	Frank Summers	1953	round 15, 1953	2	0
745	Bob Atkinson	1953–1955	round 16, 1953	17	3
746	Jack Meagher	1953–1954	round 16, 1953	4	4
747	Don Star	1954–1955	round 1, 1954	20	16
748	Keith Thomas	1954	round 1, 1954	2	0
749	Noel Tyrrell	1954–1955	round 3, 1954	4	0
750	Neville Campbell	1954, 1956–1958	round 4, 1954	17	1
751	Peter Charleston	1954	round 4, 1954	2	0
752	Lewis Leslie	1954–1956	round 4, 1954	22	7
753	Ernie Payne	1954	round 4, 1954	3	1
754	Pat Harrington	1954	round 5, 1954	7	0
755	Ken McCormack	1954–1961	round 5, 1954	108	15
756	John Ledwidge	1954–1958	round 8, 1954	40	11
757	Max Logan	1954–1955	round 8, 1954	13	3
758	Jack Hudson	1954–1959	round 9, 1954	42	1
759	Kevin Hogan	1954–1958	round 11, 1954	63	35
760	Clarrie Lane	1954–1957	round 11, 1954	23	19
761	Trevor Grant	1954–1956	round 15, 1954	11	0
762	Daryl Nelson	1954–1956	round 16, 1954	11	0
763	Des Barry	1955	round 1, 1955	8	0
764	Colin Vance	1955	round 1, 1955	3	5
765	John Woolley	1955, 1960–1962	round 1, 1955	25	0
766	John Trethowan	1955–1962	round 3, 1955	81	13
767	Bob Pratt, Jr.	1955–1958	round 4, 1955	35	35
768	John Ferguson	1955–1957	round 5, 1955	25	4
769	Frank Primmer	1955–1957	round 6, 1955	25	7
770	Hugh McLaughlin, Jr.	1955–1964	round 8, 1955	116	5
771	Ray Reed	1955–1956	round 9, 1955	10	1
772	Neil McNeill	1955–1956	round 11, 1955	11	1
773	Brian McGowan	1955, 1957–1963	round 13, 1955	118	171
774	Gerald Crough	1956–1962	round 1, 1956	56	4
775	Ellis Hicks	1956	round 1, 1956	5	1
776	Don Matthews	1956–1958	round 1, 1956	31	20
777	Ian Monks	1956–1957	round 1, 1956	14	7
778	Marshall Younger	1956–1958, 1960–1961	round 1, 1956	41	9
779	John Elder	1956–1957	round 3, 1956	17	0
780	Bob Skilton†	1956–1968, 1970–1971	round 5, 1956	237	412
781	Barry Evans	1956	round 8, 1956	3	1
782	Stan Biggs	1956	round 9, 1956	2	0
783	Max Oaten	1956–1962	round 9, 1956	80	133
784	Gerald Tagliabue	1956–1959	round 9, 1956	32	6
785	Peter Ryan	1956–1957	round 11, 1956	7	0
786	Bernie Jeffrey	1956	round 13, 1956	4	7
787	Neil Melesso	1956	round 13, 1956	3	0
788	Ken Seymour	1956–1957	round 13, 1956	8	5
789	Jimmy Cairns	1957	round 1, 1957	1	0
790	Colin Colquhoun	1957	round 1, 1957	6	0
791	Stan O'Neill	1957	round 1, 1957	11	4
792	Percy Appleyard	1957, 1960	round 3, 1957	10	8
793	Bill Power	1957–1961	round 5, 1957	51	27
794	Ken Boyd	1957–1961	round 6, 1957	60	37
795	Brian Faulkhead	1957	round 7, 1957	1	0
796	Ern Trickey	1957	round 8, 1957	4	4
797	Jack Hamilton	1957–1958	round 10, 1957	16	0
798	John Kelton	1957–1960	round 10, 1957	21	4
799	Alan Knight	1957	round 10, 1957	3	0
800	Fred Harris	1957–1959	round 13, 1957	19	0
801	Jeff Kiteley	1957–1961	round 14, 1957	39	2
802	Alan Dawson	1958	round 2, 1958	2	0
803	Mal Smith	1958	round 2, 1958	5	6
804	Gerald Brennan	1958, 1960	round 3, 1958	7	3
805	Frank Hogan	1958–1959	round 3, 1958	12	6
806	Terry Lewis	1958	round 4, 1958	3	0
807	Don Thompson	1958	round 5, 1958	1	0
808	John Heriot	1958–1968	round 9, 1958	153	39
809	Ron Stockman	1958–1959, 1961	round 9, 1958	23	0
810	Ian Tampion	1958–1960	round 10, 1958	16	1
811	Noel Rayson	1958–1959	round 13, 1958	12	18
812	Terry Brain, Jr.	1958, 1960–1961	round 18, 1958	7	4
813	Paul Briglia	1959–1961	round 1, 1959	16	14
814	Cliff Deacon	1959–1963	round 1, 1959	33	1
815	Ray Landorf	1959–1960	round 1, 1959	19	0
816	Bill McGrath	1959	round 1, 1959	15	18
817	Norm McKenzie	1959–1962	round 1, 1959	36	5
818	Bob Marshall	1959	round 4, 1959	8	0
819	Dick Burke	1959–1963	round 5, 1959	55	33
820	Bob Munn	1959–1963	round 5, 1959	41	29
821	Laurie Sharp	1959	round 7, 1959	11	5
822	Hedley Wills	1959	round 7, 1959	3	3
823	Ray Broadway	1959	round 11, 1959	3	0
824	Bill Fallon	1959	round 13, 1959	3	0
825	Greg Taube	1959–1960	round 13, 1959	5	1
826	Peter Rice	1959–1962	round 16, 1959	39	6

=== 1960s ===
Order	Name	Seasons	Debut	Games	Goals
827	Ken Barrett	1960	round 1, 1960	2	0
828	Brian Chisholm	1960	round 1, 1960	12	1
829	Frank Johnson†	1960–1964	round 1, 1960	64	38
830	Ron Porta	1960–1961	round 1, 1960	21	0
831	Brian Bennett	1960–1962	round 3, 1960	40	26
832	Alby Dunn	1960–1962, 1966	round 5, 1960	31	12
833	Fred Hepner	1960	round 5, 1960	3	0
834	Henry Gunstone	1960–1962	round 11, 1960	13	4
835	Bob Chisholm	1960–1962	round 16, 1960	22	20
836	John Carlile	1961	round 3, 1961	4	0
837	Barry Hannon	1961	round 3, 1961	2	0
838	Neil Lewthwaite	1961	round 3, 1961	9	0
839	Brian Tomlinson	1961–1962	round 5, 1961	15	0
840	Bob Kingston	1961–1967	round 6, 1961	91	102
841	Clem Goonan	1961–1964	round 8, 1961	50	2
842	Bill Hopkins	1961–1962	round 9, 1961	5	0
843	Allan Hotchkin	1961–1963	round 11, 1961	14	0
844	Ron Rolfe	1961	round 11, 1961	8	4
845	Otto Sonnleitner	1961	round 16, 1961	3	1
846	Peter Brain	1961	round 18, 1961	1	0
847	Morrie Elliott	1961	round 18, 1961	1	0
848	Harry Alexander	1962–1964	round 1, 1962	29	3
849	Ken Colvin	1962–1965	round 1, 1962	55	6
850	Neville Forge	1962	round 1, 1962	2	0
851	Geoff Heyme	1962–1963	round 1, 1962	10	0
852	Darryl Howland	1962–1963	round 1, 1962	9	1
853	Kevin Mithen	1962	round 1, 1962	4	1
854	Jim Pumphrey	1962	round 2, 1962	7	2
855	Pat Trethowan	1962–1964	round 2, 1962	30	3
856	Peter Dolling	1962–1963	round 3, 1962	23	9
857	John Fogarty	1962–1963	round 4, 1962	6	0
858	Stuart Magee	1962–1968	round 5, 1962	84	72
859	Elkin Reilly	1962–1966	round 5, 1962	51	2
860	Russell Tulloch	1962	round 5, 1962	4	1
861	Tom Hynes	1962–1964	round 6, 1962	14	1
862	Alan Self	1962–1966	round 9, 1962	24	12
863	John Plumridge	1962–1963	round 10, 1962	12	0
864	Terry McGee	1962–1963	round 12, 1962	16	2
865	Trevor Castlehow	1962	round 13, 1962	5	0
866	Gordon Dann	1962	round 16, 1962	2	0
867	Bob Porter	1962–1964	round 16, 1962	21	12
868	Des Bethke	1963–1968	round 1, 1963	56	43
869	Paul Harrison	1963–1970	round 1, 1963	119	27
870	John Rantall†	1963–1972, 1976–1979	round 1, 1963	260	8
871	Fred Rees	1963	round 2, 1963	1	0
872	Bob Strachan	1963–1965	round 2, 1963	7	0
873	Gary Johnston	1963–1964	round 3, 1963	27	1
874	Bill Ross	1963–1964	round 3, 1963	20	4
875	Trevor Somerville	1963–1967	round 3, 1963	49	4
876	Ken Phillips	1963–1964, 1966–1969	round 4, 1963	60	28
877	Eric White	1963–1965	round 5, 1963	21	7
878	Jim Fuller	1963	round 10, 1963	1	0
879	Kevin Batch	1963–1966	round 15, 1963	16	0
880	Ron Cotton	1963	round 15, 1963	4	0
881	Pat Bowd	1964	round 1, 1964	7	0
882	Ray Dawson	1964	round 1, 1964	4	0
883	Charlie Evans	1964	round 1, 1964	8	0
884	Graeme John	1964–1969	round 1, 1964	77	97
885	Max Papley	1964–1967	round 1, 1964	59	66
886	Fred Way	1964, 1966, 1969–1971	round 1, 1964	81	14
887	Ken Wharton	1964	round 1, 1964	4	2
888	Ted Collings	1964	round 2, 1964	1	0
889	Keith Baskin	1964, 1967–1973	round 3, 1964	75	78
890	Reg Edwards	1964	round 4, 1964	1	1
891	Jeff Bray	1964–1966	round 5, 1964	34	2
892	Les Heywood	1964	round 5, 1964	5	0
893	Eddie Melai	1964	round 6, 1964	7	2
894	Terry Tate	1964–1965	round 6, 1964	9	8
895	Glen Parker	1964–1966	round 7, 1964	32	5
896	Ray Nilsson	1964–1965	round 9, 1964	21	10
897	Herb Matthews, Jr.	1964–1969	round 11, 1964	82	22
898	Kevin Parker	1964–1966	round 12, 1964	20	0
899	Ken Barnes	1964–1967	round 15, 1964	15	2
900	Don Stanley	1964	round 15, 1964	4	0
901	Ian Randle	1964	round 16, 1964	1	1
902	John Long	1965–1966	round 1, 1965	7	4
903	Noel Orange	1965–1966	round 1, 1965	24	3
904	Kevin Dore	1965–1966	round 2, 1965	6	0
905	Ray Lucev	1965–1966	round 3, 1965	30	14
906	Ron Tenabel	1965–1967	round 3, 1965	17	0
907	Gary Williamson	1965	round 5, 1965	8	3
908	Brian Parker	1965	round 6, 1965	1	0
909	Geoff Davey	1965–1966	round 7, 1965	14	2
910	Ian Davison	1965–1969	round 8, 1965	55	29
911	Paul Higgins	1965	round 10, 1965	2	1
912	Haydn McAuliffe	1965–1973	round 11, 1965	105	104
913	Eric Sarich	1965–1968, 1971	round 13, 1965	62	38
914	Kevin Pedrotti	1965–1968	round 17, 1965	17	0
915	Austin Robertson, Jr.†	1966	round 1, 1966	18	60
916	John Sudholz	1966–1971	round 1, 1966	86	176
917	Greg Lambert	1966–1979	round 2, 1966	167	22
918	Eric Wilson	1966–1967	round 5, 1966	7	0
919	Clive Pasquill	1966–1967	round 7, 1966	9	0
920	Russell Cook	1966–1975	round 8, 1966	164	54
921	Doug Priest	1966–1969	round 11, 1966	26	0
922	Tony Haenen	1966–1971	round 18, 1966	93	27
923	Jack Greenwood	1967–1968	round 1, 1967	22	0
924	Stuart Bennett	1967–1970	round 2, 1967	53	25
925	Robert Hando	1967	round 2, 1967	2	0
926	Paul Kennelly	1967	round 2, 1967	1	0
927	Mick Mulligan	1967–1968	round 2, 1967	13	20
928	Kevin Roche	1967	round 3, 1967	6	0
929	Doug Magor	1967	round 7, 1967	7	0
930	Jeff McGee	1967–1968	round 7, 1967	7	7
931	Bob Mallett	1967–1968	round 8, 1967	7	1
932	Wayne Morris	1967	round 10, 1967	5	0
933	Rod Williams	1967–1968	round 11, 1967	3	1
934	Dick Wilcox	1967–1968	round 13, 1967	14	2
935	Graeme Bradly	1967	round 16, 1967	2	1
936	Wennie Van Lint	1967	round 16, 1967	2	0
937	Ian Price	1967	round 18, 1967	1	0
938	Neil Busse	1968–1969	round 1, 1968	18	2
939	Graeme Jacobs	1968–1970	round 1, 1968	57	35
940	Terry Leahy	1968–1970	round 1, 1968	39	9
941	Bruce Reid	1968–1969	round 1, 1968	5	0
942	Ron Viney	1968	round 1, 1968	5	3
943	Peter Bedford†	1968–1976	round 2, 1968	178	325
944	Richard Luke	1968–1970	round 4, 1968	39	16
945	John Luscombe	1968	round 5, 1968	1	0
946	Ross Elwin	1968, 1970	round 8, 1968	10	6
947	Ray Anderson	1968–1969	round 13, 1968	9	2
948	Don Brookes	1968	round 13, 1968	6	0
949	Rod Mohr	1968–1969	round 13, 1968	7	1
950	Peter McCracken	1968–1972	round 19, 1968	17	1
951	Graham Brandt	1969, 1971	round 1, 1969	13	2
952	Arthur Budd	1969	round 1, 1969	7	2
953	Rob Dowsing	1969	round 1, 1969	4	6
954	Wayne Walsh	1969–1972	round 1, 1969	63	5
955	John Coghlan	1969	round 3, 1969	2	1
956	Sid Catlin	1969–1970	round 4, 1969	15	14
957	Robert Doyle	1969–1975	round 4, 1969	77	36
958	Graham Page	1969	round 4, 1969	1	0
959	John Pitura	1969–1974	round 4, 1969	99	71
960	Bob Svorinich	1969, 1971	round 6, 1969	8	7
961	Steven Hoffman	1969–1978	round 7, 1969	149	187
962	Ken Luscombe	1969	round 7, 1969	7	0
963	Ron Wetzel	1969–1970	round 9, 1969	18	1
964	David McLeish	1969–1980	round 12, 1969	213	22
965	Alan Richardson	1969–1970	round 13, 1969	7	9
966	Reuben Cooper	1969	round 15, 1969	2	0
967	Gary Williams	1969–1970	round 19, 1969	6	6
968	John Hartree	1969	round 20, 1969	1	1

=== 1970s ===
Order	Name	Seasons	Debut	Games	Goals
969	Gary Brice	1970–1979	round 1, 1970	171	101
970	Shane McKew	1970–1973	round 1, 1970	33	7
971	John Murphy	1970–1973	round 1, 1970	58	21
972	Ricky Quade	1970–1980	round 1, 1970	164	110
973	Jim Wilkinson	1970–1972	round 1, 1970	15	1
974	Reg Gleeson	1970–1976	round 2, 1970	128	11
975	Mick Pavone	1970–1971	round 2, 1970	10	9
976	Neville Miller	1970–1972	round 11, 1970	28	24
977	Bruce Davis	1970–1973	round 22, 1970	36	15
978	Ernie Hug	1971	round 1, 1971	15	0
979	Jim Prentice	1971–1974	round 1, 1971	58	44
980	Peter Brown	1971–1976	round 2, 1971	77	9
981	Jim Haines	1971–1972	round 2, 1971	19	2
982	Russell McHenry	1971–1972	round 2, 1971	17	14
983	Ron Page	1971	round 2, 1971	3	1
984	Robert Grima	1971–1972, 1974	round 3, 1971	12	16
985	Graham Hocking	1971	round 5, 1971	1	0
986	Ray Ball	1971–1974	round 6, 1971	43	0
987	Stephen Officer	1971–1972, 1975	round 9, 1971	24	5
988	Trevor Carrodus	1971–1972	round 11, 1971	3	3
989	Garry Robertson	1971–1972	round 11, 1971	9	0
990	Robert Hay	1971–1972	round 14, 1971	14	1
991	Dennis Matthews	1971	round 14, 1971	1	0
992	Bob Bell	1971–1972, 1974	round 16, 1971	13	0
993	Duncan MacGregor	1971	round 17, 1971	1	0
994	David Droscher	1971	round 18, 1971	2	2
995	John Payne	1971	round 20, 1971	1	0
996	Norm Goss, Jr.	1972–1977	round 1, 1972	121	161
997	Lance Morton	1972	round 3, 1972	12	23
998	Eric Moore	1972–1973	round 6, 1972	18	28
999	Robert Stibbard	1972–1974	round 8, 1972	14	2
1000	George Lakes	1972	round 12, 1972	6	2
1001	Mick Plant	1972	round 15, 1972	4	1
1002	Wayne Ewin	1972–1973, 1975	round 16, 1972	17	3
1003	Peter Kerr	1972	round 16, 1972	1	0
1004	Max Robertson	1972, 1974–1977	round 16, 1972	70	1
1005	Stewart Gull	1972–1978	round 18, 1972	87	151
1006	Brian Woodman	1972–1978	round 18, 1972	104	46
1007	Graham Dempster	1972–1979	round 19, 1972	64	24
1008	Greg Miller	1972–1976	round 19, 1972	52	0
1009	Michael Norris	1972–1974	round 20, 1972	10	4
1010	Vic Aanensen	1973–1976	round 1, 1973	40	30
1011	Barry Beecroft	1973–1977, 1982	round 1, 1973	71	10
1012	Ian Thomson	1973–1976	round 1, 1973	74	61
1013	Geoff Craighead	1973	round 2, 1973	7	0
1014	Neville Stibbard	1973–1975	round 5, 1973	23	22
1015	Ted Obudzinski	1973	round 8, 1973	2	0
1016	Russ Hodges	1973–1977	round 11, 1973	38	10
1017	Gary Harley	1973	round 13, 1973	2	0
1018	Graeme Wilson	1974–1976	round 1, 1974	14	14
1019	Tony Franklin	1974–1975	round 3, 1974	32	11
1020	Alf Beus	1974–1975	round 11, 1974	6	0
1021	Garry Cowmeadow	1975	round 1, 1975	3	0
1022	Alan Brand	1975	round 3, 1975	2	0
1023	Mark Browning	1975–1987	round 4, 1975	251	138
1024	John Dean	1975	round 4, 1975	4	0
1025	Denis Pagan	1975–1976	round 4, 1975	23	0
1026	Garry Scott	1975	round 4, 1975	6	7
1027	Stephen Russ	1975–1976	round 5, 1975	8	1
1028	Phil Carlton	1975	round 7, 1975	10	2
1029	Francis Jackson	1975–1981, 1983	round 8, 1975	100	9
1030	Brian Roberts	1975	round 8, 1975	15	2
1031	Graham Teasdale	1975–1981	round 8, 1975	121	138
1032	John Blair	1975–1978	round 10, 1975	27	31
1033	Michael Stilo	1975–1976	round 12, 1975	12	4
1034	Colin Hounsell	1975–1979, 1981–1985	round 14, 1975	122	98
1035	Rod Coelli	1975	round 17, 1975	3	0
1036	Terry O'Neill	1975–1980	round 19, 1975	73	14
1037	Syd Anderson	1976	round 1, 1976	4	0
1038	Robert Dean	1976–1980	round 1, 1976	66	81
1039	Chris Elliott	1976–1977	round 1, 1976	8	1
1040	Peter Morrison	1976–1981	round 1, 1976	90	95
1041	Barry Round†	1976–1985	round 1, 1976	193	157
1042	Barry Goodingham	1976–1977	round 2, 1976	30	12
1043	Terry Daniher†	1976–1977	round 8, 1976	19	22
1044	Peter Carter	1977–1980	round 1, 1977	10	2
1045	Wayne Evans	1977	round 1, 1977	11	7
1046	Shane Zantuck	1977–1980	round 1, 1977	56	36
1047	Paul Morwood	1977–1982, 1986	round 2, 1977	95	65
1048	David Young	1977–1979	round 4, 1977	44	40
1049	Ray Jamieson	1977–1978	round 9, 1977	5	5
1050	Andy Demetriou	1977	round 10, 1977	1	0
1051	Michael Smith	1977–1981	round 10, 1977	32	43
1052	John Scarlett	1977–1978	round 11, 1977	29	2
1053	Bernie Evans	1978–1985	round 1, 1978	148	212
1054	Neville Fields	1978–1981	round 1, 1978	60	55
1055	Max James	1978–1982	round 1, 1978	54	57
1056	Graham Fox	1978	round 2, 1978	3	2
1057	Tony Morwood	1978–1989	round 2, 1978	229	397
1058	Michael Wright	1978–1980	round 3, 1978	40	14
1059	John Murphy†	1978–1979	round 5, 1978	23	40
1060	Phillip Plumb	1978–1981	round 13, 1978	9	1
1061	Peter Hall	1978–1979	round 19, 1978	5	0
1062	Russell Campbell	1978, 1980	round 22, 1978	4	3
1063	Daryl Cumming	1979	round 1, 1979	10	4
1064	Len Thompson†	1979	round 1, 1979	20	39
1065	Jon Hummel	1979	round 4, 1979	14	20x
1066	Stephen Wright	1979–1992	round 8, 1979	246	247
1067	Mark Fraser	1979–1981	round 9, 1979	20	1
1068	Robert Lamb	1979	round 9, 1979	7	10
1069	David Ackerly	1979–1985	round 10, 1979	138	12
1070	Max Kruse	1979–1985	round 13, 1979	88	32
1071	Ian Roberts	1979–1991	round 13, 1979	157	33
1072	Garry Williams	1979	round 13, 1979	3	0
1073	Wayne Carroll	1979–1985	round 15, 1979	56	57
1074	Doug Koop	1979–1981	round 18, 1979	15	15
1075	Dale Murphy	1979–1980	round 18, 1979	12	0
1076	Howard Tarpey	1979	round 22, 1979	1	0

=== 1980s ===
Order	Name	Seasons	Debut	Games	Goals
1077	Kevin Goss	1980–1981	round 1, 1980	24	6
1078	Victor Hugo	1980	round 1, 1980	2	0
1079	Noel Jenkinson	1980–1981	round 1, 1980	6	0
1080	Robbie McGhie	1980–1981	round 1, 1980	16	1
1081	John Roberts	1980–1982	round 1, 1980	50	135
1082	Rod Carter	1980–1990	round 4, 1980	217	1
1083	Greg Smith	1980–1984	round 5, 1980	96	64
1084	David Rhys-Jones	1980–1984	round 6, 1980	76	39
1085	Paul Callery	1980	round 9, 1980	1	0
1086	Stephen Eather	1980–1981	round 11, 1980	5	0
1087	Doug Green	1980	round 14, 1980	6	0
1088	Michael Oaten	1980–1982	round 14, 1980	6	8
1089	Kevin Taylor	1981	round 1, 1981	14	24
1090	Brett Scott	1981–1987, 1989	round 2, 1981	59	44
1091	Silvio Foschini	1981–1982	round 3, 1981	38	79
1092	Gary Cowton	1981	round 4, 1981	8	0
1093	Anthony Daniher	1981–1986	round 5, 1981	115	62
1094	Stephen Allender	1981–1983	round 6, 1981	28	28
1095	Maurice Boyse	1981, 1983	round 7, 1981	16	16
1096	Dennis Carroll	1981–1993	round 8, 1981	219	117
1097	Phillip Moir	1981	round 11, 1981	3	3
1098	Shane Morwood	1981–1982	round 14, 1981	17	13
1099	Mark Whitzell	1981, 1983–1986	round 14, 1981	12	0
1100	David Winbanks	1981–1983	round 15, 1981	15	2
1101	Bernie Conlen	1981	round 21, 1981	2	0
1102	Peter Melesso	1981	round 22, 1981	1	0

South Melbourne relocated to Sydney in 1982

Order	Name	Seasons	Debut	Games	Goals
1103	Craig Braddy	1982–1985	round 7, 1982	56	83
1104	Gerard Neesham	1982	round 7, 1982	9	1
1105	Trevor Mustey	1982–1983	round 11, 1982	2	0
1106	Steven Taubert	1982–1984	round 11, 1982	44	26
1107	Jack Lucas	1982–1984	round 13, 1982	19	6
1108	John Reid	1982–1983	round 16, 1982	10	2
1109	Daryl Vernon	1983–1984	round 1, 1983	8	2
1110	Terry Thripp	1983–1984, 1987–1992	round 2, 1983	78	43
1111	Garry Baker	1983	round 3, 1983	6	5
1112	Vin Catoggio	1983	round 4, 1983	8	9
1113	Gary Frangalas	1983–1985	round 4, 1983	51	30
1114	Darryl Sutton	1983	round 8, 1983	14	25
1115	David Stirling	1983	round 11, 1983	7	5
1116	Warwick Capper	1983–1987, 1991	round 14, 1983	90	317
1117	Steven Hedley	1983	round 14, 1983	1	1
1118	Darryl Henderson	1983	round 17, 1983	3	0
1119	Stephen McBroom	1983–1984	round 20, 1983	6	2
1120	Mark Wall	1983	round 21, 1983	1	0
1121	Peter Maloni	1983	round 22, 1983	1	0
1122	Arthur Chilcott	1984–1985	round 1, 1984	13	14
1123	Paul Hawke	1984–1987, 1991	round 1, 1984	73	72
1124	Craig Holden	1984–1988	round 1, 1984	80	22
1125	Billy Picken	1984–1985	round 1, 1984	28	0
1126	Michael Davis	1984	round 9, 1984	1	1
1127	Pat Foy	1984	round 11, 1984	7	1
1128	Tony Hughes	1984–1985	round 11, 1984	6	2
1129	David Murphy	1984–1993	round 14, 1984	156	92
1130	Barry Mitchell	1984–1992	round 16, 1984	170	214
1131	Jamie Siddons	1984	round 17, 1984	2	1
1132	Craig Potter	1984, 1987–1990	round 20, 1984	42	16
1133	Jamie Duursma	1985–1986	round 1, 1985	25	4
1134	John Ironmonger	1985–1987	round 1, 1985	45	1
1135	Darren McAsey	1985–1986, 1988–1991	round 1, 1985	34	23
1136	Mark Russell	1985	round 1, 1985	14	13
1137	Andrew Smith	1985	round 1, 1985	4	1
1138	Mark Bayes	1985–1998	round 2, 1985	246	174
1139	Malcolm Scott	1985	round 2, 1985	1	1
1140	Hilton Kotzur	1985	round 3, 1985	1	0
1141	Rob Prosser	1985	round 8, 1985	2	1
1142	Mark Roberts	1985–1986	round 10, 1985	18	5
1143	Rudy Yonson	1985	round 15, 1985	3	3
1144	Robert Saggers	1985	round 17, 1985	2	2
1145	John Favier	1985	round 18, 1985	2	0
1146	Lindsay Sneddon	1985	round 19, 1985	2	0
1147	Anthony Sinclair	1985	round 20, 1985	2	1
1148	David Bolton	1986–1991	round 1, 1986	95	46
1149	Jim Edmond	1986	round 1, 1986	17	19
1150	Gerard Healy†	1986–1990	round 1, 1986	81	87
1151	Merv Neagle	1986–1990	round 1, 1986	56	19
1152	Bernard Toohey	1986–1991	round 1, 1986	129	76
1153	Greg Williams†	1986–1991	round 1, 1986	107	118
1154	Glenn Coleman	1986–1989	round 2, 1986	61	57
1155	Tony Smith	1986–1988	round 17, 1986	17	1
1156	Grant Bartholomaeus	1986–1987	round 21, 1986	4	0
1157	Robert Caprioli	1986	round 21, 1986	1	0
1158	Graham Jones	1986	round 21, 1986	1	0
1159	Wayne Henwood	1987–1991	round 1, 1987	78	45
1160	Neil Cordy	1987–1993	round 4, 1987	96	4
1161	Graeme Cordy	1987–1989	round 7, 1987	21	6
1162	Matt Lloyd	1987–1991	round 7, 1987	22	5
1163	Michael Phyland	1987–1990	round 10, 1987	22	6
1164	Peter Quirk	1987	round 12, 1987	7	1
1165	Michael Byrne	1987–1989	round 13, 1987	21	12
1166	Leon Higgins	1987–1995	round 21, 1987	121	80
1167	John Brinkkotter	1988–1989	round 1, 1987	5	1
1168	Craig Davis	1988	round 1, 1988	9	17
1169	Michael Lockman	1988	round 1, 1988	11	1
1170	David Cordner	1988	round 2, 1988	5	6
1171	Michael Parsons	1988–1990	round 2, 1988	25	14
1172	Jim Silvestro	1988	round 3, 1988	8	7
1173	Adrian Battiston	1988–1989	round 6, 1988	9	3
1174	David Brown	1988–1990	round 6, 1988	12	18
1175	Mark Kellett	1988–1990	round 12, 1988	37	1
1176	David Willis	1988–1991	round 15, 1988	25	3
1177	Mark Eustice	1988–1991	round 17, 1988	46	9
1178	Paul Holdsworth	1989	round 3, 1989	6	3
1179	Robert Teal	1989–1990	round 3, 1989	18	18
1180	Sanford Wheeler	1989–1994	round 6, 1989	43	7
1181	Darren Ogier	1989	round 9, 1989	8	16
1182	Tim Barling	1989–1990	round 17, 1989	13	2
1183	Glenn Page	1989–1991	round 22, 1989	18	3

=== 1990s ===
Order	Name	Seasons	Debut	Games	Goals
1184	Shane Fell	1990	round 1, 1990	15	30
1185	Paul Kelly†	1990–2002	round 1, 1990	234	200
1186	Brad Tunbridge	1990–1993	round 1, 1990	50	17
1187	Jim West	1990–1992	round 1, 1990	37	54
1188	Michael Kennedy	1990	round 3, 1990	15	3
1189	Matthew Ryan	1990	round 3, 1990	10	8
1190	Dion Scott	1990, 1992	round 4, 1990	6	0
1191	Robert Kerr	1990–1991	round 6, 1990	10	2
1192	Gareth John	1990–1993	round 10, 1990	21	3
1193	Brett Page	1990	round 11, 1990	1	0
1194	David Wittey	1990	round 11, 1990	1	0
1195	Troy Luff	1990–2001	round 12, 1990	155	85
1196	Paul Starbuck	1990	round 12, 1990	1	0
1197	Dale Lewis	1990–2001	round 15, 1990	182	186
1198	Darren Denneman	1990	round 18, 1990	3	0
1199	Craig Nettelbeck	1990–1994	round 18, 1990	45	27
1200	Chris O'Dwyer	1990–1991	round 18, 1990	8	1
1201	Mark Athorn	1991	round 2, 1991	15	7
1202	Warren McKenzie	1991–1992	round 2, 1991	21	13
1203	Jason Love	1991–1992	round 3, 1991	23	54
1204	Brian Stanislaus	1991	round 3, 1991	1	0
1205	Ben Doolan	1991–1992	round 7, 1991	25	4
1206	Jamie Lawson	1991–1994	round 7, 1991	61	29
1207	Darren Holmes	1991–1994	round 10, 1991	42	6
1208	Justin Clarkson	1991	round 12, 1991	3	0
1209	Neil Brunton	1991–1995	round 22, 1991	71	10
1210	Darren Kappler	1992–1995	round 2, 1992	59	74
1211	Andrew McGovern	1992–1993	round 2, 1992	20	7
1212	Simon Minton-Connell	1992–1994	round 2, 1992	46	169
1213	David Strooper	1992–1993	round 2, 1992	32	58
1214	Andrew Dunkley	1992–2002	round 4, 1992	217	11
1215	Troy Gray	1992–1996	round 6, 1992	51	24
1216	Allan McKellar	1992	round 6, 1992	2	0
1217	Gavin Rose	1992–1996	round 7, 1992	55	4
1218	Alan Thorpe	1992	round 7, 1992	3	5
1219	Gary Stevens	1992–1993	round 10, 1992	5	1
1220	Damien Angove	1992	round 15, 1992	4	0
1221	Jason Mooney	1992–1998	round 16, 1992	97	51
1222	Stuart Wigney	1992	round 16, 1992	1	0
1223	Daryn Cresswell	1992–2003	round 17, 1992	244	208
1224	Paul Atkins	1992	round 23, 1992	2	0
1225	Robert Neill	1992–1994	round 23, 1992	21	9
1226	Paul Bryce	1993	round 2, 1993	17	14
1227	Ed Considine	1993–1995	round 2, 1993	28	6
1228	Jayson Daniels	1993–1995	round 2, 1993	58	4
1229	John Hutton	1993	round 2, 1993	5	9
1230	Nathon Irvin	1993	round 2, 1993	1	0
1231	Tony Malakellis	1993	round 2, 1993	5	3
1232	Dean McRae	1993–1996	round 2, 1993	60	30
1233	Richard Osborne	1993	round 2, 1993	16	39
1234	Scott Watters	1993–1994	round 2, 1993	37	11
1235	Michael Werner	1993–1994	round 2, 1993	20	20
1236	Greg Stafford	1993–2001	round 4, 1993	130	58
1237	Tony Begovich	1993	round 6, 1993	5	0
1238	Andrew Thomson	1993	round 8, 1993	2	1
1239	Scott Direen	1993–1997	round 9, 1993	52	10
1240	Richard Ambrose	1993	round 11, 1993	3	1
1241	Aldo Dipetta	1993	round 15, 1993	2	0
1242	Gavin McMahon	1993–1994	round 21, 1993	5	0
1243	Matthew Ahmat	1994	round 1, 1994	2	0
1244	Peter Caven	1994–1995	round 1, 1994	18	4
1245	Peter Filandia	1994, 1996–2000	round 1, 1994	70	38
1246	Damian Lang	1994	round 1, 1994	5	4
1247	Brad Seymour	1994–2003	round 1, 1994	133	12
1248	Darren Gaspar	1994–1995	round 3, 1994	21	1
1249	Mark Hepburn	1994	round 3, 1994	7	3
1250	Wade Chapman	1994–1999	round 4, 1994	51	19
1251	Derek Kickett	1994–1996	round 5, 1994	63	73
1252	Shayne Smith	1994	round 8, 1994	4	1
1253	Dermott Brereton†	1994	round 9, 1994	7	7
1254	Daniel McPherson	1994–2003	round 13, 1994	111	36
1255	Adam Heuskes	1994–1996	round 14, 1994	49	6
1256	Simon Garlick	1994–1997	round 15, 1994	44	27
1257	Shannon Grant	1995–1997	round 1, 1995	58	38
1258	Tony Lockett†	1995–1999, 2002	round 1, 1995	98	462
1259	Paul Roos†	1995–1998	round 1, 1995	87	19
1260	Justin Crawford	1995–1996	round 3, 1995	17	11
1261	Tim Scott	1995	round 4, 1995	1	0
1262	Michael O'Loughlin†	1995–2009	round 5, 1995	303	521
1263	Anthony Rocca	1995–1996	round 8, 1995	22	11
1264	Simon Arnott	1995–1998	round 10, 1995	30	15
1265	Dion Myles	1995–1997	round 18, 1995	8	1
1266	Leo Barry	1995–2009	round 22, 1995	237	56
1267	Kevin Dyson	1996–1997	round 1, 1996	35	3
1268	Stuart Maxfield	1996–2005	round 1, 1996	200	87
1269	Craig O'Brien	1996–2000	round 1, 1996	41	59
1270	Matthew Nicks	1996–2005	round 3, 1996	175	125
1271	Stefan Carey	1996–1999	round 6, 1996	45	22
1272	Clinton King	1996–1997	round 12, 1996	9	4
1273	Shannon Corcoran	1997	round 1, 1997	2	0
1274	Paul Licuria	1997–1998	round 1, 1997	10	2
1275	Mark Orchard	1997–1998	round 1, 1997	41	5
1276	Ben Wilson	1997	round 1, 1997	4	0
1277	Troy Cook	1997–1999	round 3, 1997	43	11
1278	John Stevens	1997–2001	round 3, 1997	78	45
1279	Mark Kinnear	1997–1998	round 6, 1997	6	1
1280	Rowan Warfe	1997–2004	round 6, 1997	84	4
1281	Ben Mathews	1997, 1999–2008	round 16, 1997	198	45
1282	Robert Ahmat	1998–2001	round 1, 1998	42	46
1283	Jason Saddington	1998–2005	round 1, 1998	142	41
1284	Wayne Schwass	1998–2002	round 2, 1998	98	57
1285	Brent Green	1998	round 3, 1998	7	8
1286	Jared Crouch	1998–2009	round 7, 1998	223	51
1287	Brett O'Farrell	1998	round 13, 1998	8	9
1288	Andrew Bomford	1999–2000	round 1, 1999	15	4
1289	Adam Goodes	1999–2015	round 1, 1999	372	464
1290	Ryan O'Connor	1999–2000	round 1, 1999	24	2
1291	Scott Russell	1999	round 1, 1999	16	8
1292	Gerrard Bennett	1999–2002	round 3, 1999	32	11
1293	Simon Feast	1999–2001	round 5, 1999	14	3
1294	Nic Fosdike	1999–2008	round 5, 1999	164	66
1295	Will Sangster	1999	round 7, 1999	2	0
1296	Fred Campbell	1999	round 8, 1999	5	3
1297	Jude Bolton	1999–2013	round 12, 1999	325	196
1298	Heath James	1999, 2001, 2003–2004	round 19, 1999	18	1
1299	Brett Kirk	1999–2010	round 19, 1999	241	96

=== 2000s ===
Order	Name	Seasons	Debut	Games	Goals
1300	Brett Allison	2000	round 1, 2000	9	9
1301	Jason Ball	2000–2001, 2003–2005	round 1, 2000	90	45
1302	Ryan Fitzgerald	2000	round 1, 2000	10	15
1303	Andrew Schauble	2000–2005	round 1, 2000	88	23
1304	Ryan O'Keefe	2000–2014	round 10, 2000	286	261
1305	Ben Fixter	2000–2002, 2004	round 18, 2000	27	8
1306	Stephen Doyle	2000–2006	round 20, 2000	47	19
1307	Paul Williams	2001–2006	round 1, 2001	117	84
1308	Tadhg Kennelly	2001–2008, 2010–2011	round 1, 2014	197	30
1309	Brent Piltz	2001	round 19, 2001	1	0
1310	Barry Hall†	2002–2009	round 1, 2002	162	467
1311	Ricky Mott	2002	round 1, 2002	17	3
1312	Scott Stevens	2002–2003	round 1, 2002	25	17
1313	Nick Daffy	2002	round 2, 2002	1	1
1314	Leigh Brockman	2002	round 3, 2002	10	0
1315	Amon Buchanan	2002, 2004–2009	round 11, 2002	116	57
1316	Luke Ablett	2002–2009	round 13, 2002	133	39
1317	Jarrad Sundqvist	2002–2003	round 21, 2002	9	1
1318	Craig Bolton	2003–2010	round 1, 2003	170	15
1319	Nick Davis	2003–2008	round 1, 2003	97	150
1320	Adam Schneider	2003–2007	round 1, 2003	98	99
1321	James Meiklejohn	2003–2004	round 5, 2003	6	0
1322	Mark Powell	2003–2004	round 6, 2003	8	0
1323	Lewis Roberts-Thomson	2003–2014	round 8, 2003	179	54
1324	Paul Bevan	2004–2011	round 1, 2004	129	39
1325	Jarrad McVeigh	2004–2019	round 1, 2004	300	199
1326	Aaron Rogers	2004	round 6, 2004	2	0
1327	Josh Thewlis	2004	round 13, 2004	2	0
1328	Darren Jolly	2005–2009	round 1, 2005	118	59
1329	Sean Dempster	2005–2007	round 3, 2005	54	8
1330	David Spriggs	2005	round 3, 2005	5	0
1331	Jarred Moore	2005–2011	round 7, 2005	68	52
1332	Luke Vogels	2005–2007	round 7, 2005	17	11
1333	Nick Malceski	2005–2014	round 11, 2005	176	67
1334	Paul Chambers	2006	round 1, 2006	12	0
1335	Ted Richards	2006–2016	round 1, 2006	228	15
1336	Simon Phillips	2006–2007	round 15, 2006	5	2
1337	Heath Grundy	2006–2019	round 16, 2006	237	23
1338	Tim Schmidt	2006–2008	round 17, 2006	17	12
1339	Peter Everitt	2007–2008	round 1, 2007	39	17
1340	Kieren Jack	2007–2019	round 6, 2007	229	154
1341	Matthew Laidlaw	2007	round 13, 2007	1	0
1342	Luke Brennan	2007–2008	round 17, 2007	9	1
1343	Ed Barlow	2007–2010	round 20, 2007	26	18
1344	Craig Bird	2008–2015	round 1, 2008	137	56
1345	Martin Mattner	2008–2013	round 1, 2008	124	26
1346	Nick Smith	2008–2019	round 5, 2008	191	10
1347	Jesse White	2008–2013	round 6, 2008	71	73
1348	Henry Playfair	2008, 2010	round 7, 2008	16	14
1349	Matthew O'Dwyer	2008–2010	round 16, 2008	7	2
1350	Ryan Brabazon	2008–2009	round 18, 2008	3	1
1351	Patrick Veszpremi	2008–2010	round 18, 2008	11	12
1352	Rhyce Shaw	2009–2015	round 1, 2009	143	24
1353	Brett Meredith	2009–2011	round 2, 2009	16	10
1354	Kristin Thornton	2009	round 4, 2009	8	4
1355	Mike Pyke	2009–2015	round 6, 2009	110	48
1356	Dan Hannebery	2009–2018	round 16, 2009	208	95

=== 2010s ===
Order	Name	Seasons	Debut	Games	Goals
1357	Daniel Bradshaw	2010–2012	round 1, 2010	9	28
1358	Lewis Jetta	2010–2015	round 1, 2010	127	99
1359	Josh Kennedy	2010–2022	round 1, 2010	274	153
1360	Ben McGlynn	2010–2016	round 1, 2010	127	167
1361	Shane Mumford	2010–2013	round 1, 2010	79	36
1362	Mark Seaby	2010–2012	round 1, 2010	18	5
1363	Gary Rohan	2010–2018	round 7, 2010	106	96
1364	Campbell Heath	2010–2012	round 9, 2010	2	0
1365	Trent Dennis-Lane	2010–2012	round 14, 2010	19	30
1366	Sam Reid	2010–2024	round 22, 2010	181	183
1367	Andrejs Everitt	2011–2013	round 1, 2011	43	24
1368	Byron Sumner	2011	round 1, 2011	1	0
1369	Alex Johnson	2011–2018	round 3, 2011	47	1
1370	Nathan Gordon	2011	round 7, 2011	2	1
1371	Luke Parker	2011–2024	round 8, 2011	293	213
1372	Lewis Johnston	2011	round 10, 2011	2	1
1373	Matt Spangher	2011–2012	round 16, 2011	6	8
1374	Harry Cunningham^	2012–	round 1, 2012	221	54
1375	Tony Armstrong	2012–2013	round 4, 2012	15	2
1376	Tommy Walsh	2012–2014	round 8, 2012	5	3
1377	Mitch Morton	2012–2013	round 21, 2012	12	11
1378	Dane Rampe^	2013–	round 1, 2013	277	9
1379	Jed Lamb	2013	round 6, 2013	12	9
1380	Tom Mitchell	2013–2016	round 10, 2013	65	38
1381	Brandon Jack	2013–2017	round 11, 2013	28	16
1382	Kurt Tippett	2013–2017	round 13, 2013	74	137
1383	Xavier Richards	2013–2016	round 14, 2013	12	13
1384	Shane Biggs	2013–2014	round 23, 2013	6	0
1385	Lance Franklin	2014–2023	round 1, 2014	172	486
1386	Jeremy Laidler	2014–2017	round 1, 2014	61	6
1387	Tom Derickx	2014–2016	round 2, 2014	13	6
1388	Jake Lloyd^	2014–	round 5, 2014	276	52
1389	Zak Jones	2014–2019	round 14, 2014	90	23
1390	Dean Towers	2014–2018	round 17, 2014	57	31
1391	Tim Membrey	2014	round 19, 2014	1	0
1392	Sam Naismith	2014–2022	round 23, 2014	30	3
1393	Isaac Heeney^	2015–	round 1, 2015	228	308
1394	Dan Robinson	2015–2018	round 9, 2015	25	6
1395	Toby Nankervis	2015–2016	round 14, 2015	12	3
1396	James Rose	2015–2019	round 21, 2015	14	7
1397	George Hewett	2016–2021	round 1, 2016	120	32
1398	Callum Mills^	2016–	round 1, 2016	179	30
1399	Tom Papley^	2016–	round 1, 2016	201	311
1400	Callum Sinclair	2016–2022	round 1, 2016	89	45
1401	Michael Talia	2016–2017	round 1, 2016	1	0
1402	Aliir Aliir	2016–2020	round 6, 2016	64	5
1403	Jack Hiscox	2016	round 8, 2016	1	0
1404	Harrison Marsh	2016–2018	round 10, 2016	25	0
1405	Jordan Foote	2016–2018	round 18, 2016	6	1
1406	Oliver Florent	2017–2025	round 1, 2017	184	51
1407	Robbie Fox	2017–2025	round 2, 2017	105	15
1408	Will Hayward	2017–2025	round 2, 2017	184	229
1409	Nic Newman	2017–2018	round 2, 2017	31	8
1410	Jordan Dawson	2017–2021	round 3, 2017	64	34
1411	Lewis Melican^	2017–	round 5, 2017	105	2
1412	Ben Ronke	2018–2022	round 6, 2018	43	39
1413	Tom McCartin^	2018–	round 7, 2018	157	31
1414	Ryley Stoddart	2018–2020	round 10, 2018	6	1
1415	Colin O'Riordan	2018–2022	round 17, 2018	33	1
1416	Darcy Cameron	2018–2019	round 18, 2018	1	0
1417	Nick Blakey^	2019–	round 1, 2019	156	51
1418	Ryan Clarke	2019–2023	round 1, 2019	57	13
1419	Jackson Thurlow	2019–2020	round 3, 2019	17	3
1420	Justin McInerney^	2019–	round 4, 2019	114	53
1421	James Rowbottom^	2019–	round 5, 2019	145	45
1422	Daniel Menzel	2019	round 11, 2019	7	7
1423	Hayden McLean^	2019–	round 18, 2019	98	100
1424	James Bell	2019–2022	round 21, 2019	27	11

=== 2020s ===
Order	Name	Seasons	Debut	Games	Goals
1425	Kaiden Brand	2020–2021	round 1, 2020	5	0
1426	Sam Gray	2020–2021	round 1, 2020	7	1
1427	Lewis Taylor	2020–2022	round 1, 2020	11	6
1428	Dylan Stephens	2020–2023	round 6, 2020	43	11
1429	Chad Warner^	2020–	round 6, 2020	113	104
1430	Elijah Taylor	2020	round 7, 2020	4	1
1431	Matthew Ling	2020–2021	round 8, 2020	4	0
1432	Sam Wicks^	2020–	round 10, 2020	92	45
1433	Zac Foot	2020	round 12, 2020	2	1
1434	Joel Amartey^	2020–	round 17, 2020	66	97
1435	Braeden Campbell^	2021–	round 1, 2021	94	32
1436	Errol Gulden^	2021–	round 1, 2021	105	76
1437	Tom Hickey	2021–2023	round 1, 2021	49	13
1438	Logan McDonald^	2021–	round 1, 2021	75	100
1439	Paddy McCartin	2022–2023	round 1, 2022	28	1
1440	Angus Sheldrick^	2022–	round 1, 2022	33	10
1441	Peter Ladhams^	2022–	round 4, 2022	31	13
1442	Matthew Roberts^	2022–	round 11, 2022	53	6
1443	Will Gould	2023	round 5, 2023	4	0
1444	Corey Warner^	2023–	round 5, 2023	26	12
1445	Aaron Francis	2023–2025	round 6, 2023	30	6
1446	Marc Sheather	2023	round 7, 2023	3	1
1447	Lachlan McAndrew	2023–2024	round 10, 2023	2	0
1448	Jack Buller	2023–2025	round 14, 2023	10	11
1449	Brodie Grundy^	2024–	round 0, 2024	53	13
1450	James Jordon^	2024–	round 0, 2024	54	21
1451	Caleb Mitchell	2024–2025	round 3, 2024	3	0
1452	Taylor Adams^	2024–	round 4, 2024	23	10
1453	Caiden Cleary^	2024–	round 15, 2024	18	3
1454	Tom Hanily^	2025–	round 0, 2025	8	6
1455	Ben Paton	2025	round 0, 2025	4	0
1456	Riley Bice^	2025–	round 1, 2025	21	2
1457	Joel Hamling^	2025–	round 1, 2025	15	3
1458	Jesse Dattoli^	2025–	round 21, 2025	3	0
1459	Charlie Curnow^	2026–	round 0, 2026	5	9
1460	Malcolm Rosas^	2026–	round 0, 2026	4	5
1461	Jai Serong^	2026–	round 0, 2026	5	1
1462	Billy Cootee	2026–	round 7, 2026	1	1
1463	Will Edwards	2026–	round 7, 2026	1	0

== Other players ==
=== Listed players yet to make their debut for Sydney ===
Player	Date of birth	Acquired	Listed	
Player	Date of birth	Acquired	Rookie	Senior
Riak Andrew	February 17, 2005	No. 55, 2024 national draft from Dandenong Stingrays	—N/a	2025–
Ned Bowman	August 9, 2005	No. 26, 2024 national draft from Norwood	—N/a	2025–
Noah Chamberlain	March 21, 2007	Category B rookie from St Ives Saints	2026–	—N/a
Will Green	August 9, 2005	No. 16, 2023 national draft from Northern Knights	—N/a	2024–
Liam Hetheron	May 2, 2007	Category B rookie from Murray Bushrangers	2026–	—N/a
Max King	January 9, 2007	No. 35, 2025 national draft from Cardiff Hawks	—N/a	2026–
Harry Kyle	July 16, 2007	No. 14, 2025 national draft from UNSW-Eastern Suburbs Bulldogs	—N/a	2026–
Jevan Phillipou	March 30, 2007	No. 35, 2025 national draft from Woodville-West Torrens	—N/a	2026–
Patrick Snell	July 18, 2005	No. 53, 2023 national draft from Wilston Grange	—N/a	2024–

=== Delisted players who did not play a senior game for Sydney ===
Player	Date of birth	Draft details	Rookie list	Senior list
Harrison Arnold	4 August 1999	No. 5, 2023 mid-season rookie draft from Brisbane	2023–2024	—N/a
Kent Butcher	5 November 1973	No. 45, 1993 pre-season draft from Geelong	—N/a	1996
Jake Brown	13 March 1998	No.41, 2017 pre-rookie draft selection from Sydney Academy/St George	2018	—N/a
Malachy Carruthers	11 May 2002	No. 3, 2021 Rookie draft from Sturt	2021	—N/a
Andrew Donnelly	29 March 1973	No. 50, 1992 national draft from Subiaco	—N/a	1994
Shaun Edwards	13 December 1993	No. 49, 2017 rookie draft from Essendon	2017	—N/a
Sam Fisher	23 February 1998	2016 pre-rookie draft selection from Canberra	2017	—N/a
Taylor Gilchrist	19 October 1990	No. 28, 2008 rookie draft from Sandringham Dragons	2008-2010	—N/a
Glenn Gorman	26 January 1976	No. 4, 1992 national draft from Geelong Falcons	—N/a	1994
Peter Green	3 May 1974	Recruited from Barellan		
Daryl Griffin	23 January 1976	No. 28, 1992 national draft from Western Jets	—N/a	1994
Hugo Hall-Kahan	22 September 2003	No. 11, 2022 mid-season rookie draft from Sandringham Dragons	2022–2023	—N/a
Simon Hawking	5 March 1973	Traded from Brisbane	—N/a	1998
Simon Hose	13 April 1967	Recruited from Western Districts	—N/a	1987–1988
Jacob Konstanty	9 November 2004	No. 20, 2022 national draft from Gippsland Power	—N/a	2023–2024
Indhi Kirk	31 August 2004	Category B Rookie, 2024 rookie draft from Sydney	2024–2025	—N/a
Blake Leidler	20 March 2006	No. 14 2025 rookie draft from Oakleigh Chargers	2025	—N/a
Tyrone Leonardis	22 July 1997	No. 51, 2015 national draft from Northern Knights	—N/a	2016–2017
Jaiden Magor	16 February 2004	No. 31, 2023 rookie draft from South Adelaide	2023–2024	—N/a
Stuart Mangin	8 February 1977	No. 10, 1994 national draft from Northern Knights	—N/a	1995–1997
Sam Murray	2 September 1997	No. 66, 2016 rookie draft from Wodonga	2016–2017	—N/a
Barry O'Connor	26 June 1998	Category B Rookie, 2020 rookie draft from Wexford GAA	2020–2022	—N/a
Chris Obst	9 October 1979	No. 26, 2002 rookie draft from Hawthorn	2002	—N/a
Jake Orreal	26 September 1989	No. 41, 2007 rookie draft from Western Taipans	2007-2010	—N/a
Cameron Owen	28 May 2004	No. 17, 2023 rookie draft from Tasmania Devils	2023	—N/a
Toby Pink	11 August 1998	No. 54, 2016 rookie draft from Glenelg	2017–2019	—N/a
Lachlan Rankin	5 February 2003	No. 58, 2021 national draft from Oakleigh Chargers	—N/a	2022–2023
Harry Reynolds	11 October 2000	No. 28 2019 rookie draft from Sandringham Dragons	2019–2020	—N/a
Paul Rouvray	18 April 1972	Traded from Adelaide	—N/a	1995
Brady Rowles	12 February 2001	No. 4, 2019 rookie draft from Bendigo	2020	—N/a
Dwayne Simpson	12 February 1981	No. 59, 1998 national draft from East Fremantle	—N/a	1999–2000
Rohan Smith	28 June 1966	No. 36, 1989 national draft from Port Adelaide	—N/a	1990
Stephen Tingay	13 August 1970	No. 6, 2001 pre-season draft from Melbourne	—N/a	2001
Durak Tucker	9 February 2000	No. 12 2019 Rookie Draft from Peel Thunder	2019	—N/a
Cooper Vickery	16 December 2004	No. 27, 2022 national draft from Gippsland Power	—N/a	2023–2024

== Sydney Swans AFLW players ==
Key
Order	Players are listed in order of jumper number
Seasons	Includes Sydney Swans only careers and spans from when a player was first listed with the club to their final year on the list
Debut	Debuts are for AFLW regular season and finals series matches only
Games	Statistics are for AFLW regular season and finals games only and are correct as of round one, 2024.
Goals	Statistics are for AFLW regular season and finals games only and are correct as of round one, 2024.

=== 2020s ===
Cap	Player	Games	Goals	Playing Career
1	Brooke Lochland	29	11	2022 ^{(S7)}–2024
2	Bridie Kennedy	12	0	2022 ^{(S7)}–2023
3	Paige Sheppard	19	0	2022 ^{(S7)}–2024
4	Sarah Dargan	9	3	2022 ^{(S7)}
5	Ally Morphett^	34	6	2022 ^{(S7)}–
6	Molly Eastman	10	0	2022 ^{(S7)}
7	Cynthia Hamilton^	46	27	2022 ^{(S7)}–
8	Bella Smith	26	11	2022 ^{(S7)}-2024
9	Ella Heads	33	1	2022 ^{(S7)}-2024
10	Alana Woodward	18	0	2022 ^{(S7)}-2024
11	Sarah Skinner	8	1	2022 ^{(S7)}
12	Aliesha Newman	19	8	2022 ^{(S7)}-2023
13	Montana Ham^	40	19	2022 ^{(S7)}–
14	Rebecca Privitelli	36	37	2022 ^{(S7)}–2025
15	Brenna Tarrant^	48	0	2022 ^{(S7)}–
16	Lisa Steane	27	0	2022 ^{(S7)}-2024
17	Aimee Whelan	16	3	2022 ^{(S7)}-2024
18	Genevieve Lawson-Tavan	7	0	2022 ^{(S7)}
19	Sofia Hurley^	42	13	2022 ^{(S7)}–
20	Lauren Szigeti	20	0	2022 ^{(S7)}-2024
21	Lexi Hamilton^	43	6	2022 ^{(S7)}–
22	Sarah Ford	2	0	2022 ^{(S7)}-2023
23	Kate Reynolds	2	0	2022 ^{(S7)}-2023
24	Eliza Vale	8	1	2022 ^{(S7)}-2024
25	Tiarne Cavanagh	1	0	2022 ^{(S7)}
26	Jaide Anthony	3	1	2022 ^{(S7)}-2023
27	Maddy Collier	13	0	2022 ^{(S7)}–2025
28	Ruby Sargent-Wilson	21	4	2022 ^{(S7)}–2025
29	Kiara Beesley	4	0	2022 ^{(S7)}–2023
30	Zoe Hurrell	2	1	2022 ^{(S7)}
31	Chloe Molloy^	26	45	2023–
32	Alice Mitchell^	33	0	2023–
32	Lucy McEvoy^	39	6	2023–
33	Julie O'Sullivan^	28	2	2023–
34	Tanya Kennedy^	36	4	2023–
35	Laura Gardiner^	37	6	2023–
36	Montana Beruldsen	14	4	2022 ^{(S7)}–2024
37	Paris McCarthy^	26	8	2023–
38	Kiara Hillier	3	0	2024–2025
39	Sarah Grunden^	23	7	2024–
40	Giselle Davies	13	1	2024–2025
41	Hayley Bullas	7	0	2024
42	Lara Hausegger^	22	0	2024–
43	Holly Cooper^	23	13	2024–
44	Darcy Moloney^	15	2	2025–
45	Jasmine Grierson^	12	1	2025–
46	Lulu Pullar^	13	1	2025–
47	Caitlin Reid^	8	0	2025–
48	Ash Van Loon^	14	0	2025–
49	Zippy Fish^	16	4	2025–
50	Amelia Martin^	6	1	2025–
51	Sarah Steele-Park^	2	0	2025–
52	Imogen Brown^	4	1	2025–
53	Taylor Smith^	2	5	2026–
54	Maddie Quinn^	4	1	2026–
55	Molly Thomas^	3	0	2026–
56	Emma Juneja^	2	0	2026–

== See also ==
- List of Sydney Swans coaches
- List of Sydney Swans captains
