= Melesso =

Melesso is a surname. Notable people with the surname include:

- Neil Melesso (1931–2019), Australian footballer
- Peter Melesso (born 1961), Australian footballer

== See also ==
- Malesso, Guam, village
