= Ellis Hicks (footballer) =

Australian rules footballer

Personal information
- Full name: Ellis Hicks
- Born: 10 October 1934
- Died: 7 June 1961 (aged 26)
- Original team: Stanhope / Wesley College
- Height: 188 cm (6 ft 2 in)
- Weight: 79 kg (174 lb)

Playing career^{1}
Years	Club	Games (Goals)
1956	South Melbourne	5 (1)
- ^{1} Playing statistics correct to the end of 1956.

Ellis Hicks (10 October 1934 – 7 June 1961) was an Australian rules footballer who played with South Melbourne in the Victorian Football League (VFL).
