= Sydney Strong =

Australian rules footballer

Personal information
- Full name: Sydney Strong
- Born: 9 October 1897
- Died: 18 November 1952 (aged 55)

Playing career^{1}
| Years | Club | Games (Goals) |
| 1917 | South Melbourne | 2 (0) |
- ^{1} Playing statistics correct to the end of 1917.

Sydney Strong (9 October 1897 – 18 November 1952) was an Australian rules footballer who played with South Melbourne in the Victorian Football League (VFL).
