= Shane McKew =

Australian rules footballer

Personal information
- Full name: Shane McKew
- Born: 1 March 1949 (age 77)
- Original team: Port Melbourne
- Height: 184 cm (6 ft 0 in)
- Weight: 78 kg (172 lb)

Playing career^{1}
Years	Club	Games (Goals)
1970–73	South Melbourne	33 (7)
- ^{1} Playing statistics correct to the end of 1973.

Shane McKew (born 1 March 1949) is a former Australian rules footballer who played with South Melbourne in the Victorian Football League (VFL).
