= Bert Lucas (footballer, born 1921) =

Australian rules footballer

Personal information
- Full name: Herbert George Lucas
- Born: 12 December 1921; South Melbourne, Victoria
- Died: 26 April 1973 (aged 51); Prahran, Victoria
- Original team: South Melbourne Districts
- Height: 170 cm (5 ft 7 in)
- Weight: 66 kg (146 lb)

Playing career^{1}
Years	Club	Games (Goals)
1941	South Melbourne	4 (6)
- ^{1} Playing statistics correct to the end of 1941.

Herbert George Lucas (12 December 1921 – 26 April 1973) was an Australian rules footballer who played for the South Melbourne Football Club in the Victorian Football League (VFL).

At the end of the 1941 VFL season he enlisted to serve in the Australian Army, serving until the end of World War II.
