= Don Matthews (footballer) =

Australian rules footballer

Personal information
- Full name: Don Matthews
- Born: 23 September 1936
- Died: 12 September 2015 (aged 78)
- Original team: South Melbourne Districts
- Height: 170 cm (5 ft 7 in)
- Weight: 75 kg (165 lb)

Playing career^{1}
Years	Club	Games (Goals)
1956–58	South Melbourne	31 (20)
- ^{1} Playing statistics correct to the end of 1958.

Don Matthews (23 September 1936 – 12 September 2015) was an Australian rules footballer who played with South Melbourne in the Victorian Football League (VFL).
