= Ted Obudzinski =

Australian rules footballer

Personal information
- Full name: Ted Obudzinski
- Born: 17 January 1954 (age 72)
- Original team: Wagga Wagga
- Height: 192 cm (6 ft 4 in)
- Weight: 89 kg (196 lb)

Playing career^{1}
Years	Club	Games (Goals)
1973	South Melbourne	2 (0)
- ^{1} Playing statistics correct to the end of 1973.

Ted Obudzinski (born 17 January 1954) is a former Australian rules footballer who played with South Melbourne in the Victorian Football League (VFL).
