= Brett Page =

Australian rules footballer

Personal information
- Full name: Brett Page
- Born: 5 September 1966 (age 60)
- Original team: East Wagga
- Height: 184 cm (6 ft 0 in)
- Weight: 87 kg (192 lb)

Playing career^{1}
Years	Club	Games (Goals)
1990	Sydney Swans	1 (0)
- ^{1} Playing statistics correct to the end of 1990.

Brett Page (born 5 September 1966) is a former Australian rules footballer who played with the Sydney Swans in the Australian Football League (AFL).

Page, from East Wagga, played his only senior AFL game in the 11th round of the 1990 season, against Hawthorn at Princes Park. He had four disposals and kicked a behind.
