= Les Heywood =

Australian rules footballer

Personal information
- Full name: Les Heywood
- Born: 4 November 1942 (age 83)
- Original team: Croydon
- Height: 177 cm (5 ft 10 in)
- Weight: 86 kg (190 lb)

Playing career^{1}
Years	Club	Games (Goals)
1964	South Melbourne	5 (0)
- ^{1} Playing statistics correct to the end of 1964.

Les Heywood (born 4 November 1942) is a former Australian rules footballer who played with South Melbourne in the Victorian Football League (VFL).
