= Barry Hannon =

Australian rules footballer

Personal information
- Full name: Barry Joseph Hannon
- Born: 2 January 1940
- Died: 6 June 2020 (aged 80)
- Original team: Echuca
- Height: 182 cm (6 ft 0 in)
- Weight: 80 kg (176 lb)

Playing career^{1}
Years	Club	Games (Goals)
1961	South Melbourne	2 (0)
- ^{1} Playing statistics correct to the end of 1961.

Barry Joseph Hannon (2 January 1940 – 6 June 2020) was an Australian rules footballer who played for the South Melbourne Football Club in the Victorian Football League (VFL).
