= Fred Rees =

Australian rules footballer

Personal information
- Full name: Fred Rees
- Born: 26 May 1943 (age 83)
- Original team: Loch
- Height: 187 cm (6 ft 2 in)
- Weight: 79 kg (174 lb)

Playing career^{1}
Years	Club	Games (Goals)
1963	South Melbourne	1 (0)
- ^{1} Playing statistics correct to the end of 1963.

Fred Rees (born 26 May 1943) is a former Australian rules footballer who played with South Melbourne in the Victorian Football League (VFL).
