= Stan O'Neill =

Australian rules footballer

Personal information
- Full name: Stanley Maxwell O'Neill
- Born: 6 January 1932
- Died: 27 December 2010 (aged 78)
- Original team: Devon (Yarram)
- Height: 179 cm (5 ft 10 in)
- Weight: 80 kg (176 lb)

Playing career^{1}
Years	Club	Games (Goals)
1957	South Melbourne	11 (4)
- ^{1} Playing statistics correct to the end of 1957.

Stanley Maxwell O'Neill (6 January 1932 – 27 December 2010) was an Australian rules footballer who played with South Melbourne in the Victorian Football League (VFL).

O'Neill, described as a "rugged half-back", was about to debut for South Melbourne in Round 1 of the 1954 season when he broke a bone in his ankle in three places. He eventually returned to play with South Melbourne in 1957.
