= Alan McPherson (footballer) =

Australian rules footballer

Personal information
- Full name: Alan McPherson
- Born: 1 January 1932
- Died: 15 February 2009 (aged 77)
- Original team: Commonwealth Bank
- Height: 183 cm (6 ft 0 in)
- Weight: 76 kg (168 lb)

Playing career^{1}
Years	Club	Games (Goals)
1953–1954	South Melbourne	8 (12)
- ^{1} Playing statistics correct to the end of 1954.

Alan McPherson (1 January 1932 – 15 February 2009) was an Australian rules footballer who played for the South Melbourne Football Club in the Victorian Football League (VFL). McPherson transferred to Williamstown in the VFA in 1955 and played 44 games and kicked 127 goals up until the end of 1958, including the 1955 and 1956 premiership victories over Port Melbourne. In the latter game, he took 8 spectacular marks and kicked 6.4 to earn best-on-ground honours. McPherson was the Club leading goalkicker in 1957 with 62 majors, and he twice kicked ten goals in a game - against Camberwell in 1956 and Prahran in 1957.
