= Glen Parker =

Australian rules footballer

Personal information
- Full name: Glen Thomas Parker
- Born: 12 January 1945 (age 81)
- Height: 180 cm (5 ft 11 in)
- Weight: 67 kg (148 lb)

Playing career^{1}
Years	Club	Games (Goals)
1964–66	South Melbourne	32 (5)
1967–69	Waverley (VFA)	
- ^{1} Playing statistics correct to the end of 1969.

Glen Thomas Parker (born 12 January 1945) is a former Australian rules footballer who played with South Melbourne in the Victorian Football League (VFL).
