= Daryl Nelson =

Australian rules footballer (1934–2017)

Personal information
- Full name: Darroll Ernest Nelson
- Born: 29 November 1934
- Died: 15 August 2017 (aged 82)
- Height: 191 cm (6 ft 3 in)
- Weight: 79 kg (174 lb)

Playing career^{1}
Years	Club	Games (Goals)
1954–56	South Melbourne	11 (0)
- ^{1} Playing statistics correct to the end of 1956.

Darroll Ernest Nelson (29 November 1934 – 15 August 2017) was an Australian rules footballer who played with South Melbourne in the Victorian Football League (VFL).
