= Kevin Roche (footballer) =

Australian rules footballer

Personal information
- Full name: Kevin Roche
- Born: 4 April 1947 (age 79)
- Original team: Talbot
- Height: 183 cm (6 ft 0 in)
- Weight: 75 kg (165 lb)

Playing career^{1}
Years	Club	Games (Goals)
1967	South Melbourne	6 (0)
- ^{1} Playing statistics correct to the end of 1967.

Kevin Roche (born 4 April 1947) is a former Australian rules footballer who played with South Melbourne in the Victorian Football League (VFL).
