= Gerry McDonald (footballer) =

Australian rules footballer

Personal information
- Full name: Gerry McDonald
- Born: 27 July 1931 (age 95)
- Original team: Warrnambool
- Height: 179 cm (5 ft 10 in)
- Weight: 86 kg (190 lb)

Playing career^{1}
Years	Club	Games (Goals)
1953–56	South Melbourne	36 (0)
- ^{1} Playing statistics correct to the end of 1956.

Gerard "Gerry" McDonald (born 27 July 1931) is a former Australian rules footballer who played with South Melbourne in the Victorian Football League (VFL).

Following his years in the Australian Football League, he returned to Warrnambool. In 1964 he married Maureen McDonald (née Gleeson), and had his first daughter in 1965.
