= Tommy Murphy (Australian footballer) =

Australian rules footballer

Personal information
- Full name: Tommy Murphy
- Born: 8 November 1903
- Died: 25 May 1958 (aged 54)

Playing career^{1}
Years	Club	Games (Goals)
1928	South Melbourne	3 (0)
- ^{1} Playing statistics correct to the end of 1928.

Tommy Murphy (8 November 1903 – 25 May 1958) was an Australian rules footballer who played with South Melbourne in the Victorian Football League (VFL).
