= Stephen McBroom =

Australian rules footballer

Personal information
- Full name: Stephen McBroom
- Born: 1 April 1964 (age 62)
- Original team: Port Colts
- Height: 169 cm (5 ft 7 in)
- Weight: 76 kg (168 lb)

Playing career^{1}
Years	Club	Games (Goals)
1979–84	Sydney	92 (27)
- ^{1} Playing statistics correct to the end of 1984.

Stephen McBroom (born 1 April 1964) is a former Australian rules footballer who played with South Melbourne Sydney in the Victorian Football League (VFL).
