= Jack Fergeus =

Australian rules footballer

Personal information
- Full name: Jack Fergeus
- Born: 5 June 1918
- Died: 16 September 2005 (aged 87)
- Original team: Malvern Amateurs
- Height: 165 cm (5 ft 5 in)
- Weight: 63 kg (139 lb)

Playing career^{1}
Years	Club	Games (Goals)
1940	South Melbourne	2 (1)
- ^{1} Playing statistics correct to the end of 1940.

Jack Fergeus (5 June 1918 – 16 September 2005) was an Australian rules footballer who played with South Melbourne in the Victorian Football League (VFL).
