= Len Milburn =

Australian rules footballer

Personal information
- Full name: Len Milburn
- Born: 19 July 1908
- Died: 4 March 1998 (aged 89)
- Height: 170 cm (5 ft 7 in)
- Weight: 63 kg (139 lb)

Playing career^{1}
Years	Club	Games (Goals)
1931	South Melbourne	12 (3)
- ^{1} Playing statistics correct to the end of 1931.

Len Milburn (19 July 1908 – 4 March 1998) was an Australian rules footballer who played with South Melbourne in the Victorian Football League (VFL).
