= John Luscombe (Australian footballer) =

Australian rules footballer

Personal information
- Full name: John Luscombe
- Born: 13 March 1948 (age 78)
- Height: 191 cm (6 ft 3 in)
- Weight: 83 kg (183 lb)

Playing career^{1}
Years	Club	Games (Goals)
1968	South Melbourne	1 (0)
- ^{1} Playing statistics correct to the end of 1968.

John Luscombe (born 13 March 1948) is a former Australian rules footballer who played with South Melbourne in the Victorian Football League (VFL).
