= Dick Wilcox =

Australian rules footballer

Personal information
- Full name: Dick Wilcox
- Born: 6 August 1944 (age 82)
- Original team: University Blues
- Height: 180 cm (5 ft 11 in)
- Weight: 80 kg (176 lb)

Playing career^{1}
Years	Club	Games (Goals)
1967–68	South Melbourne	14 (2)
- ^{1} Playing statistics correct to the end of 1968.

Dick Wilcox (born 6 August 1944) is a former Australian rules footballer who played with South Melbourne in the Victorian Football League (VFL).
