= Don Templeton =

Australian rules footballer

Personal information
- Full name: Don Templeton
- Born: 15 August 1901
- Died: 24 January 1952 (aged 50)
- Original team: Casterton

Playing career^{1}
Years	Club	Games (Goals)
1922	South Melbourne	1 (0)
- ^{1} Playing statistics correct to the end of 1922.

Don Templeton (15 August 1901 – 24 January 1952) was an Australian rules footballer who played with South Melbourne in the Victorian Football League (VFL).
