= Max Glass (footballer) =

Australian rules footballer (1925–2025)

Personal information
- Full name: Maxwell Herbert Glass
- Born: 2 October 1925
- Died: July 2025 (aged 99)
- Height: 173 cm (5 ft 8 in)
- Weight: 69 kg (152 lb)

Playing career^{1}
Years	Club	Games (Goals)
1945	South Melbourne	3 (0)
- ^{1} Playing statistics correct to the end of 1945.

Maxwell Herbert Glass (2 October 1925 – July 2025) was an Australian rules footballer who played with South Melbourne in the Victorian Football League (VFL). He died in July 2025, at the age of 99.
