= Rod Mohr =

Australian rules footballer

Personal information
- Full name: Rod Mohr
- Born: 24 May 1950 (age 76)
- Original team: Holbrook
- Height: 187 cm (6 ft 2 in)
- Weight: 80 kg (176 lb)

Playing career^{1}
Years	Club	Games (Goals)
1968–69	South Melbourne	7 (1)
- ^{1} Playing statistics correct to the end of 1969.

Rod Mohr (born 24 May 1950) is a former Australian rules footballer who played with South Melbourne in the Victorian Football League (VFL).
