= Geoff Craighead =

Australian rules footballer

Personal information
- Full name: Geoff Craighead
- Born: 14 October 1949 (age 77)
- Original team: ANU
- Height: 192 cm (6 ft 4 in)
- Weight: 96 kg (212 lb)

Playing career^{1}
| Years | Club | Games (Goals) |
| 1973 | South Melbourne | 7 (0) |
- ^{1} Playing statistics correct to the end of 1973.

Geoff Craighead (born 14 October 1949) is a former Australian rules footballer who played with South Melbourne in the Victorian Football League (VFL).
