= Hedley Wills =

Australian rules footballer

Personal information
- Full name: Hedley Wills
- Born: 19 March 1940
- Died: 21 February 2013 (aged 72)
- Original team: Minyip
- Height: 188 cm (6 ft 2 in)
- Weight: 83 kg (183 lb)

Playing career^{1}
Years	Club	Games (Goals)
1959	South Melbourne	3 (3)
- ^{1} Playing statistics correct to the end of 1959.

Hedley Wills (19 March 1940 – 21 February 2013) was an Australian rules footballer who played with South Melbourne in the Victorian Football League (VFL).
