= Mark Wall (footballer) =

Australian rules footballer

Personal information
- Full name: Mark Wall
- Born: 8 November 1963 (age 62)
- Original team: Mulgrave
- Height: 180 cm (5 ft 11 in)
- Weight: 76 kg (168 lb)

Playing career^{1}
Years	Club	Games (Goals)
1983	Sydney	1 (0)
- ^{1} Playing statistics correct to the end of 1983.

Mark Wall (born 8 November 1963) is a former Australian rules footballer who played with Sydney in the Victorian Football League (VFL).
