= Bill Hopkins (Australian footballer) =

Australian rules footballer

Personal information
- Full name: Bill Hopkins
- Born: 13 March 1939 (age 87)
- Original team: Murchison
- Height: 179 cm (5 ft 10 in)
- Weight: 86 kg (190 lb)

Playing career^{1}
Years	Club	Games (Goals)
1961–62	South Melbourne	5 (0)
- ^{1} Playing statistics correct to the end of 1962.

Bill Hopkins (born 13 March 1939) is a former Australian rules footballer who played with South Melbourne in the Victorian Football League (VFL).
