= John Plumridge =

Australian rules footballer

Personal information
- Full name: John Kevin Plumridge
- Born: 13 April 1944
- Died: 28 June 2016 (aged 72)
- Original team: CBC Parade
- Height: 179 cm (5 ft 10 in)
- Weight: 83 kg (183 lb)
- Position: Centre

Playing career^{1}
| Years | Club | Games (Goals) |
| 1962–63 | South Melbourne | 12 (0) |
- ^{1} Playing statistics correct to the end of 1963.

John Kevin Plumridge (born 13 April 1944 – 28 June 2016) was an Australian rules footballer who played with South Melbourne in the Victorian Football League (VFL).
