= Arthur Timms =

Australian rules footballer

Personal information
- Full name: Arthur Timms
- Born: 9 July 1914
- Died: 29 July 1970 (aged 56)
- Height: 187 cm (6 ft 2 in)
- Weight: 84 kg (185 lb)

Playing career^{1}
Years	Club	Games (Goals)
1938	South Melbourne	1 (1)
- ^{1} Playing statistics correct to the end of 1938.

Arthur Timms (9 July 1914 – 29 July 1970) was an Australian rules footballer who played for the South Melbourne Football Club in the Victorian Football League (VFL).
