= Jimmy Cairns =

Australian rules footballer

Personal information
- Born: 12 March 1938 (age 88)
- Original team: Spotswood
- Height: 178 cm (5 ft 10 in)
- Weight: 72 kg (159 lb)

Playing career^{1}
Years	Club	Games (Goals)
1957	South Melbourne	1 (0)
- ^{1} Playing statistics correct to the end of 1957.

Jimmy Cairns (born 12 March 1938) is a former Australian rules footballer who played with South Melbourne in the Victorian Football League (VFL).
