= Stephen Russ =

Australian rules footballer (born 1955)

Personal information
- Full name: Stephen Russ
- Born: 29 April 1955 (age 71)
- Original team: Ormond Amateurs
- Height: 179 cm (5 ft 10 in)
- Weight: 73 kg (161 lb)

Playing career^{1}
Years	Club	Games (Goals)
1975–76	South Melbourne	8 (1)
- ^{1} Playing statistics correct to the end of 1976.

Stephen Russ (born 29 April 1955) is a former Australian rules footballer who played with South Melbourne in the Victorian Football League (VFL).
