= Ian Price =

Australian rules footballer

Personal information
- Full name: Ian Price
- Born: 19 June 1947 (age 79)
- Original team: Alexandra
- Height: 191 cm (6 ft 3 in)
- Weight: 87 kg (192 lb)

Playing career^{1}
Years	Club	Games (Goals)
1967	South Melbourne	1 (0)
- ^{1} Playing statistics correct to the end of 1967.

Ian Price (born 19 June 1947) is a former Australian rules footballer who played with South Melbourne in the Victorian Football League (VFL).
