= Arthur Punshon =

Australian rules footballer

Personal information
- Full name: Arthur Richard Punshon
- Born: 1 March 1891; Williamstown, Victoria
- Died: 20 July 1955 (aged 64); South Melbourne, Victoria

Playing career^{1}
Years	Club	Games (Goals)
1910–1911	South Melbourne	11 (2)
- ^{1} Playing statistics correct to the end of 1911.

Arthur Richard Punshon (1 March 1891 – 20 July 1955) was an Australian rules footballer who played for the South Melbourne Football Club in the Victorian Football League (VFL).
