= Jack Bruce (footballer) =

Australian rules footballer

Personal information
- Born: 1 July 1926
- Died: 6 April 1956 (aged 29)
- Height: 174 cm (5 ft 9 in)
- Weight: 75 kg (165 lb)

Playing career^{1}
Years	Club	Games (Goals)
1949	South Melbourne	5 (2)
- ^{1} Playing statistics correct to the end of 1949.

Jack Bruce (1 July 1926 – 6 April 1956) was an Australian rules footballer who played with South Melbourne in the Victorian Football League (VFL).
