= Bill Mannion =

Australian rules footballer

Personal information
- Full name: Bill Mannion
- Born: 28 October 1906
- Died: 26 August 1968 (aged 61)
- Original team: Middle Park

Playing career^{1}
Years	Club	Games (Goals)
1928	South Melbourne	1 (0)
- ^{1} Playing statistics correct to the end of 1928.

Bill Mannion (28 October 1906 – 26 August 1968) was an Australian rules footballer who played with South Melbourne in the Victorian Football League (VFL).
