= Noel Tyrrell =

Australian rules footballer

Personal information
- Full name: Noel Tyrrell
- Born: 12 September 1932
- Died: 4 May 2010 (aged 77)
- Original team: Montague / Oakleigh
- Height: 184 cm (6 ft 0 in)
- Weight: 86 kg (190 lb)

Playing career^{1}
Years	Club	Games (Goals)
1954–55	South Melbourne	4 (0)
- ^{1} Playing statistics correct to the end of 1955.

Noel Tyrrell (12 September 1932 – 4 May 2010) was an Australian rules footballer who played with South Melbourne in the Victorian Football League (VFL).
