= Michael Norris (footballer) =

Australian rules footballer

Personal information
- Full name: Michael James Norris
- Born: 6 October 1954 (age 72)
- Original team: Ormond Amateurs
- Height: 171 cm (5 ft 7 in)
- Weight: 66 kg (146 lb)

Playing career^{1}
| Years | Club | Games (Goals) |
| 1972–74 | South Melbourne | 10 (4) |
| 1975 | Melbourne | 0 (-) |
| 1976–78 | Mordialloc (VFA) | 49 (137) |
- ^{1} Playing statistics correct to the end of 1978.

Michael James Norris (born 6 October 1954) is a former Australian rules footballer who played with South Melbourne in the Victorian Football League (VFL).

After ten games across three seasons with South Melbourne, Norris moved to Melbourne in 1975 but did not play a senior game for them. Norris subsequently enjoyed a highly successful period with Mordialloc in the Victorian Football Association, scoring over 40 goals in each of his three seasons at the club and winning the VFA Division 2 premiership in 1977.
