= Ron Digney =

Australian rules footballer

Personal information
- Full name: Ron Digney
- Born: 28 February 1932
- Died: 5 October 2009 (aged 77)
- Height: 171 cm (5 ft 7 in)
- Weight: 72 kg (159 lb)

Playing career^{1}
Years	Club	Games (Goals)
1951–53	South Melbourne	9 (2)
- ^{1} Playing statistics correct to the end of 1953.

Ron Digney (28 February 1932 – 5 October 2009) was an Australian rules footballer who played with South Melbourne in the Victorian Football League (VFL).

Family

Grandson - Campbell Miller
