= Neville Campbell =

Australian rules footballer (1934–2006)

Personal information
- Full name: Neville Campbell
- Born: 12 December 1934
- Died: 30 November 2006 (aged 71)
- Original team: Newport / Spotswood
- Height: 188 cm (6 ft 2 in)
- Weight: 80 kg (176 lb)

Playing career^{1}
Years	Club	Games (Goals)
1954, 1956–58	South Melbourne	17 (1)
- ^{1} Playing statistics correct to the end of 1958.

Neville Stanley Campbell (12 December 1934 – 30 November 2006) was an Australian rules footballer who played with South Melbourne in the Victorian Football League (VFL). Campbell died on 30 November 2006, at the age of 71.
