= Ted Collings =

Australian rules footballer

Personal information
- Full name: Ted Collings
- Born: 5 June 1943
- Died: 18 June 2011 (aged 68)
- Original team: Parkside
- Height: 180 cm (5 ft 11 in)
- Weight: 79 kg (174 lb)

Playing career^{1}
Years	Club	Games (Goals)
1964	South Melbourne	1 (0)
- ^{1} Playing statistics correct to the end of 1964.

Ted Collings (5 June 1943 – 18 June 2011) was an Australian rules footballer who played with South Melbourne in the Victorian Football League (VFL).
