= Ned Baptiste =

Australian rules footballer

Personal information
- Full name: Edward Ormiston Baptist
- Born: 9 March 1883; Port Melbourne, Victoria
- Died: 19 June 1907 (aged 24); Melbourne, Victoria
- Original team: Port Rovers / Graham Street Methodists

Playing career^{1}
Years	Club	Games (Goals)
1903	South Melbourne	7 (0)
- ^{1} Playing statistics correct to the end of 1903.

Edward Ormiston Baptiste (born Baptist; 9 March 1883 – 19 June 1907) was an Australian rules footballer who played with South Melbourne in the Victorian Football League (VFL).

Although born Edward Ormiston Baptist, he was known by the surname Baptiste during his playing career.
