= Artie Hollis =

Australian rules footballer

Personal information
- Full name: Arthur Augustus Hollis
- Born: 20 May 1878; Williamstown, Victoria
- Died: 27 October 1955 (aged 77); Heidelberg, Victoria

Playing career^{1}
Years	Club	Games (Goals)
1901	South Melbourne	4 (0)
- ^{1} Playing statistics correct to the end of 1901.

Arthur Augustus Hollis, MM (20 May 1878 – 27 October 1955) was an Australian rules footballer who played for the South Melbourne Football Club in the Victorian Football League (VFL).
