= Will Newbould =

Australian rules footballer

Personal information
- Full name: William Ernest Newbould
- Born: 11 May 1880; Malvern, Victoria
- Died: 27 July 1968 (aged 88); Hawthorn East, Victoria
- Original team: Malvern

Playing career^{1}
Years	Club	Games (Goals)
1903	South Melbourne	1 (0)
- ^{1} Playing statistics correct to the end of 1903.

William Ernest Newbould (11 May 1880 – 27 July 1968) was an Australian rules footballer who played with South Melbourne in the Victorian Football League (VFL).
