= Don Brookes =

Australian rules footballer

Personal information
- Full name: Don Brookes
- Born: 7 June 1951 (age 75)
- Original team: Koroit / Melbourne High School
- Height: 185 cm (6 ft 1 in)
- Weight: 76 kg (168 lb)

Playing career^{1}
| Years | Club | Games (Goals) |
| 1968 | South Melbourne | 6 (0) |
- ^{1} Playing statistics correct to the end of 1968.

Don Brookes (born 7 June 1951) is a former Australian rules footballer who played with South Melbourne in the Victorian Football League (VFL).
