= Alan Brand =

Australian rules footballer

Personal information
- Full name: Alan Brand
- Born: 24 April 1954 (age 72)
- Original team: Springvale
- Height: 180 cm (5 ft 11 in)
- Weight: 76 kg (168 lb)

Playing career^{1}
Years	Club	Games (Goals)
1975	South Melbourne	2 (0)
- ^{1} Playing statistics correct to the end of 1975.

Alan Brand (born 24 April 1954) is a former Australian rules footballer who played for the South Melbourne Football Club in the Victorian Football League (VFL).
