= Max Robertson (footballer) =

Australian rules footballer (born 1954)

Personal information
- Full name: Max Robertson
- Born: 14 September 1954 (age 72)
- Original team: Cohuna Union
- Height: 185 cm (6 ft 1 in)
- Weight: 87 kg (192 lb)
- Position: Halfback

Playing career^{1}
Years	Club	Games (Goals)
1972, 1974–77	South Melbourne	70 (1)
- ^{1} Playing statistics correct to the end of 1977.

Max Robertson (born 14 September 1954) is a former Australian rules footballer who played with South Melbourne in the Victorian Football League (VFL) which is now known as the Australian Football League (AFL).
