= Lewis Leslie =

Australian rules footballer

Personal information
- Full name: Lewis Leslie
- Born: 19 January 1934 (age 92)
- Original team: Healesville
- Height: 178 cm (5 ft 10 in)
- Weight: 81 kg (179 lb)

Playing career^{1}
Years	Club	Games (Goals)
1954–56	South Melbourne	22 (7)
- ^{1} Playing statistics correct to the end of 1956.

Lewis Leslie (born 19 January 1934) is a former Australian rules footballer who played with South Melbourne in the Victorian Football League (VFL).
