= Kevin Batch =

Australian rules footballer

Personal information
- Full name: Kevin William Batch
- Born: 24 June 1941
- Died: 5 August 2024 (aged 83)
- Original team: Box Hill
- Height: 188 cm (6 ft 2 in)
- Weight: 76 kg (168 lb)

Playing career^{1}
Years	Club	Games (Goals)
1963–66	South Melbourne	16 (0)
- ^{1} Playing statistics correct to the end of 1966.

Kevin William Batch (24 June 1941 — 5 August 2024) was an Australian rules footballer who played with South Melbourne in the Victorian Football League (VFL).
