= Les Weate =

Australian rules footballer

Personal information
- Full name: Leslie Weate
- Born: 18 March 1885; Carlton, Victoria
- Died: 24 November 1949 (aged 64); Fitzroy, Victoria

Playing career^{1}
Years	Club	Games (Goals)
1904–05, 1907	South Melbourne	4 (1)
- ^{1} Playing statistics correct to the end of 1907.

Leslie Weate (18 March 1885 – 24 November 1949) was an Australian rules footballer who played with South Melbourne in the Victorian Football League (VFL).
