= Brian Faulkhead =

Australian rules footballer

Personal information
- Full name: Brian Faulkhead
- Born: 9 May 1937
- Died: 22 June 2005 (aged 68)
- Original team: East Sandringham
- Height: 183 cm (6 ft 0 in)
- Weight: 71 kg (157 lb)

Playing career^{1}
Years	Club	Games (Goals)
1957	South Melbourne	1 (0)
- ^{1} Playing statistics correct to the end of 1957.

Brian Faulkhead (9 May 1937 – 22 June 2005) was an Australian rules footballer who played with South Melbourne in the Victorian Football League (VFL).
