= Clive Pasquill =

Australian rules footballer

Personal information
- Full name: Clive William Pasquill
- Born: 6 December 1946
- Died: 18 August 2011 (aged 64)
- Height: 179 cm (5 ft 10 in)
- Weight: 69 kg (152 lb)

Playing career^{1}
Years	Club	Games (Goals)
1966–67	South Melbourne	9 (0)
- ^{1} Playing statistics correct to the end of 1967.

Clive William Pasquill (6 December 1946 – 18 August 2011) was an Australian rules footballer who played with South Melbourne in the Victorian Football League (VFL).
