= Brian Woodman =

Australian rules footballer

Personal information
- Full name: Brian Woodman
- Born: 10 October 1950 (age 76)
- Original team: Springvale
- Height: 178 cm (5 ft 10 in)
- Weight: 70 kg (154 lb)
- Position: Back pocket

Playing career^{1}
Years	Club	Games (Goals)
1972–78	South Melbourne	104 (46)
- ^{1} Playing statistics correct to the end of 1978.

Brian Woodman (born 10 October 1950) is a former Australian rules footballer who played with South Melbourne in the Victorian Football League (VFL).
