= Robert Grima =

Australian rules footballer

Personal information
- Full name: Robert Grima
- Born: 26 January 1952 (age 74)
- Height: 187 cm (6 ft 2 in)
- Weight: 85 kg (187 lb)

Playing career^{1}
| Years | Club | Games (Goals) |
| 1971–72, 1974 | South Melbourne | 12 (16) |
- ^{1} Playing statistics correct to the end of 1974.

Robert Grima (born 26 January 1952) is a former Australian rules footballer who played with South Melbourne in the Victorian Football League (VFL).
