= David Droscher =

Australian rules footballer

Personal information
- Full name: David Droscher
- Born: 27 July 1950 (age 76)
- Original team: Richmond reserves
- Height: 185 cm (6 ft 1 in)
- Weight: 79 kg (174 lb)

Playing career^{1}
| Years | Club | Games (Goals) |
| 1971 | South Melbourne | 2 (2) |
- ^{1} Playing statistics correct to the end of 1971.

David Droscher (born 27 July 1950) is a former Australian rules footballer who played with South Melbourne in the Victorian Football League (VFL).
