= Ollie McKelson =

Australian rules footballer

Personal information
- Full name: William McKelson
- Born: 13 August 1881; Carlton, Victoria
- Died: 5 December 1950 (aged 69); Parkville, Victoria
- Original team: Studley

Playing career^{1}
Years	Club	Games (Goals)
1903	South Melbourne	1 (0)
- ^{1} Playing statistics correct to the end of 1903.

William "Ollie" McKelson (13 August 1881 – 5 December 1950) was an Australian rules footballer who played a single game with South Melbourne in the Victorian Football League (VFL).
