= Mick Mulligan (footballer) =

Australian rules footballer

Personal information
- Full name: Mick Mulligan
- Born: 21 October 1947 (age 79)
- Height: 178 cm (5 ft 10 in)
- Weight: 77 kg (170 lb)

Playing career^{1}
Years	Club	Games (Goals)
1967–68	South Melbourne	13 (20)
- ^{1} Playing statistics correct to the end of 1968.

Mick Mulligan (born 21 October 1947) is a former Australian rules footballer who played with South Melbourne in the Victorian Football League (VFL).
