= Ken McCormack =

Australian rules footballer

Personal information
- Full name: Ken McCormack
- Born: 18 January 1933
- Height: 179 cm (5 ft 10 in)
- Weight: 68 kg (150 lb)
- Position: Wing

Playing career^{1}
Years	Club	Games (Goals)
1954–61	South Melbourne	108 (15)
- ^{1} Playing statistics correct to the end of 1961.

Ken McCormack (born 18 January 1933) is a former Australian rules footballer who played with South Melbourne in the Victorian Football League (VFL).
