= Ken Wharton (footballer) =

Australian rules footballer

Personal information
- Full name: Ken Wharton
- Born: 2 June 1942 (age 84)
- Original team: Croydon
- Height: 196 cm (6 ft 5 in)
- Weight: 93 kg (205 lb)

Playing career^{1}
Years	Club	Games (Goals)
1964	South Melbourne	4 (2)
- ^{1} Playing statistics correct to the end of 1964.

Ken Wharton (born 2 June 1942) is a former Australian rules footballer who played with South Melbourne in the Victorian Football League (VFL).
