= Kevin Hilet =

Australian rules footballer

Personal information
- Full name: Kevin Hilet
- Born: 6 February 1929
- Died: 20 March 2006 (aged 77)
- Original team: Yarrawonga
- Height: 175 cm (5 ft 9 in)
- Weight: 76 kg (168 lb)
- Position: Halfback

Playing career^{1}
Years	Club	Games (Goals)
1950–54	South Melbourne	65 (1)
- ^{1} Playing statistics correct to the end of 1954.

Kevin Hilet (6 February 1929 – 20 March 2006) was a former Australian rules footballer who played with South Melbourne in the Victorian Football League (VFL).
