= Fred O'Brien =

Australian rules footballer

Personal information
- Full name: Frederick Michael O'Brien
- Born: 17 April 1878
- Died: 26 October 1951 (aged 73); Crystal Brook, South Australia

Playing career^{1}
Years	Club	Games (Goals)
1905	South Melbourne	2 (1)
- ^{1} Playing statistics correct to the end of 1905.

Frederick Michael O'Brien (17 April 1878 – 26 October 1951) was an Australian rules footballer who played with South Melbourne in the Victorian Football League (VFL).

Recruited from South Adelaide where he had played since 1898, O'Brien played for South Melbourne in Rounds 2 and 3 of the 1905 VFL season, scoring a goal in his second appearance.
