= Cyril McNamara =

Australian rules footballer

Personal information
- Full name: Cyril McNamara
- Born: 3 April 1908
- Died: 27 October 1966 (aged 58)

Playing career^{1}
Years	Club	Games (Goals)
1931	South Melbourne	3 (0)
- ^{1} Playing statistics correct to the end of 1931.

Cyril McNamara (3 April 1908 – 27 October 1966) was an Australian rules footballer who played with South Melbourne in the Victorian Football League (VFL).
