= Martin Pash =

Australian rules footballer

Personal information
- Full name: Martin Julius Pash
- Born: 12 November 1883; Port Melbourne, Victoria
- Died: 2 May 1920 (aged 36); Port Melbourne, Victoria

Playing career^{1}
Years	Club	Games (Goals)
1906	South Melbourne	7 (8)
- ^{1} Playing statistics correct to the end of 1906.

Martin Julius Pash (12 November 1883 – 2 May 1920) was an Australian rules footballer who played with South Melbourne in the Victorian Football League (VFL).
