= Jack Eichhorn =

Australian rules footballer (1926–2018)

Personal information
- Full name: Jack Eichhorn
- Born: 23 December 1925; Port Melbourne
- Died: 20 February 2018 (aged 92); East Melbourne
- Original team: South Districts
- Height: 179 cm (5 ft 10 in)
- Weight: 78 kg (172 lb)
- Position: Half Forward / wing

Playing career^{1}
Years	Club	Games (Goals)
1948–54	South Melbourne	50 (29)
- ^{1} Playing statistics correct to the end of 1954.

Jack Eichhorn (23 December 1926 – 20 February 2018) was an Australian rules footballer who played for the South Melbourne Football Club in the Victorian Football League (VFL).
