= Garry Robertson =

Australian rules footballer

Personal information
- Full name: Garry Robertson
- Born: 2 March 1953 (age 73)
- Original team: Springvale
- Height: 184 cm (6 ft 0 in)
- Weight: 77 kg (170 lb)

Playing career^{1}
Years	Club	Games (Goals)
1971–72	South Melbourne	9 (0)
- ^{1} Playing statistics correct to the end of 1972.

Garry Robertson (born 2 March 1953) is a former Australian rules footballer who played with South Melbourne in the Victorian Football League (VFL).
