= Trevor Grant (footballer) =

Australian rules footballer

Personal information
- Full name: Trevor Grant
- Born: 5 August 1934 (age 92)
- Original team: South Melbourne Districts
- Height: 188 cm (6 ft 2 in)
- Weight: 83 kg (183 lb)

Playing career^{1}
Years	Club	Games (Goals)
1954–56	South Melbourne	11 (0)
- ^{1} Playing statistics correct to the end of 1956.

Trevor Grant (born 5 August 1934) is a former Australian rules footballer who played with South Melbourne in the Victorian Football League (VFL).
