= Ernie McDougall =

Australian rules footballer

Personal information
- Full name: Ernest James McDougall
- Born: 28 September 1885; Melbourne, Victoria
- Died: 15 March 1963 (aged 77); Corwen, Wales
- Original team: South Melbourne College

Playing career^{1}
Years	Club	Games (Goals)
1902–03	South Melbourne	4 (3)
- ^{1} Playing statistics correct to the end of 1903.

Ernest James McDougall (28 September 1885 – 15 March 1963) was an Australian rules footballer who played with South Melbourne in the Victorian Football League (VFL).

A small player, he made his debut late in the 1902 season at the age of 16 and acquitted himself well. He only played four games, all of them before his eighteenth birthday.

After his brief football career McDougall became a dentist, working in Melbourne for three years before moving to London. While in London, he enlisted to serve in the Australian Army Medical Corps in World War I in 1916 and he remained there after being discharged in 1919, working in a private dental practice.
