= Gerald Tagliabue =

Australian rules footballer

Personal information
- Full name: Gerald Tagliabue
- Born: 15 September 1935
- Died: 20 April 2016 (aged 80)
- Original team: Swan Hill
- Height: 188 cm (6 ft 2 in)
- Weight: 78 kg (172 lb)

Playing career^{1}
Years	Club	Games (Goals)
1956–59	South Melbourne	32 (6)
- ^{1} Playing statistics correct to the end of 1959.

Gerald Tagliabue (15 September 1935 – 20 April 2016) was an Australian rules footballer who played with South Melbourne in the Victorian Football League (VFL).
