= Phillip Moir =

Australian rules footballer

Personal information
- Full name: Phillip Moir
- Born: 28 December 1958 (age 67)
- Original team: City South (TAS)
- Height: 183 cm (6 ft 0 in)
- Weight: 79 kg (174 lb)

Playing career^{1}
Years	Club	Games (Goals)
1981	South Melbourne	3 (3)
- ^{1} Playing statistics correct to the end of 1981.

Phillip Moir (born 28 December 1958) is a former Australian rules footballer who played with South Melbourne in the Victorian Football League (VFL).
