= Len Coffey =

Australian rules footballer

Personal information
- Full name: Leonard John Coffey
- Born: 8 August 1883; Sandringham, Victoria
- Died: 20 April 1919 (aged 35); South Melbourne, Victoria

Playing career^{1}
Years	Club	Games (Goals)
1905	South Melbourne	1 (0)
- ^{1} Playing statistics correct to the end of 1905.

Leonard John Coffey (8 August 1883 – 20 April 1919) was an Australian rules footballer who played with South Melbourne in the Victorian Football League (VFL).
