= Trevor Castlehow =

Australian rules footballer

Personal information
- Full name: Trevor Castlehow
- Born: 21 March 1944
- Died: 10 August 2008 (aged 64)
- Original team: Port Melbourne Fourths
- Height: 173 cm (5 ft 8 in)
- Weight: 77 kg (170 lb)

Playing career^{1}
Years	Club	Games (Goals)
1962	South Melbourne	5 (0)
- ^{1} Playing statistics correct to the end of 1962.

Trevor Castlehow (21 March 1944 – 10 August 2008) was an Australian rules footballer who played with South Melbourne in the Victorian Football League (VFL).
