= Tom Nadort =

Australian rules footballer (1894–1967)

Personal information
- Full name: Thomas Van De Nadort
- Born: 14 July 1894; Bendigo, Victoria
- Died: 19 October 1967 (aged 73); Bendigo, Victoria
- Height: 182 cm (6 ft 0 in)
- Weight: 83 kg (183 lb)

Playing career^{1}
Years	Club	Games (Goals)
1914	Brunswick (VFA)	1 (0)
1921	South Melbourne	16 (1)
- ^{1} Playing statistics correct to the end of 1921.

Thomas Van De Nadort (14 July 1894 – 19 October 1967) was an Australian rules footballer who played with South Melbourne in the Victorian Football League (VFL).
