= Frank Worroll =

Australian rules footballer

Personal information
- Full name: Frank Worroll
- Born: 5 July 1877; Williamstown, Victoria
- Died: 19 September 1940 (aged 63); Williamstown, Victoria
- Original team: Williamstown (VFA)
- Position: Rover

Playing career^{1}
Years	Club	Games (Goals)
1901–03	South Melbourne	31 (12)
- ^{1} Playing statistics correct to the end of 1903.

Frank Worroll (5 July 1877 – 19 September 1940) was an Australian rules footballer who played with South Melbourne in the Victorian Football League (VFL) and Williamstown in the Victorian Football Association (VFA).
