= Gary Harley =

Australian rules footballer

Personal information
- Full name: Gary Harley
- Born: 5 June 1934 (age 92)
- Height: 175 cm (5 ft 9 in)
- Weight: 172 kg (379 lb)

Playing career^{1}
Years	Club	Games (Goals)
1973	South Melbourne	2 (0)
- ^{1} Playing statistics correct to the end of 1973.

Gary Harley (born 5 June 1934) is a former Australian rules footballer who played with South Melbourne in the Victorian Football League (VFL).
