= Geoff Davey =

Australian rules footballer

Personal information
- Full name: Geoffrey Raymond Davey
- Born: 3 September 1945; Canterbury, Victoria
- Died: 4 June 1967 (aged 21); Prahran, Victoria
- Original team: National Bank
- Height: 178 cm (5 ft 10 in)
- Weight: 73 kg (161 lb)

Playing career^{1}
Years	Club	Games (Goals)
1965–66	South Melbourne	14 (2)
- ^{1} Playing statistics correct to the end of 1966.

Geoffrey Raymond Davey (3 September 1945 – 4 June 1967) was an Australian rules footballer who played with South Melbourne in the Victorian Football League (VFL).
