= Pat Bowd =

Australian rules footballer

Personal information
- Full name: Pat Bowd
- Born: 5 August 1945 (age 81)
- Original team: Clayton
- Height: 184 cm (6 ft 0 in)
- Weight: 76 kg (168 lb)

Playing career^{1}
Years	Club	Games (Goals)
1964	South Melbourne	7 (0)
- ^{1} Playing statistics correct to the end of 1964.

Pat Bowd (born 5 August 1945) is a former Australian rules footballer who played with South Melbourne in the Victorian Football League (VFL). Following his football career, Bowd had a successful running career as professional athlete in the Victorian Athletic League. He was inducted into the Stawell Gift Hall of Fame in 2007.
