= Neil Melesso =

Australian rules footballer (1931–2019)

Personal information
- Full name: Neil Melesso
- Born: 7 April 1931
- Died: 25 February 2019 (aged 87)
- Height: 173 cm (5 ft 8 in)
- Weight: 73 kg (161 lb)

Playing career^{1}
Years	Club	Games (Goals)
1956	South Melbourne	3 (0)
- ^{1} Playing statistics correct to the end of 1956.

Neil Melesso (7 April 1931 – 25 February 2019) was an Australian rules footballer who played with South Melbourne in the Victorian Football League (VFL).
