= Allan Salisbury =

- Born: Allan John Salisbury; 1949 (age 76–77); Kyabram, Victoria, Australia
- Occupations: cartoonist, illustrator
- Writing career
- Pen name: Sols
- Period: 1974–present

Allan Salisbury (born 1949), known professionally as Sols, is an Australian comic book writer, best known for his newspaper comic Snake Tales. Salisbury's other creations include Lennie the Loser and Fingers and Foes, the latter helping to establish Salisbury in the United States.

Allan John Salisbury was born in 1949 in Kyabram, Victoria, after completing his secondary school education Salisbury took a job at the Cyclone Company in Melbourne, where he eventually became the company's advertising officer. It was there that he began working on a comic strip, The Ludicrous Life of Lenny the Loser. He then went to see William Ellis Green ('Weg') at The Herald, who suggested that he get an agent to represent him, recommending Sol Shifrin. Shifrin agreed to represent him but suggested he develop a strip with dialogue. As a result, Salisbury created Fingers and Toes (sub-titled The Little League of Disorganised Crime), an American gangster strip set in the 1930s. It became the first Australian comic strip to be purchased by a US syndicate, Publishers-Hall, without being published in Australia. The strip debuted in March 1974, appearing in the Chicago Sun-Times, Dallas News, The Philadelphia Inquirer, Miami Herald, Vancouver Sun and Winnipeg Tribune. Fingers and Toes, however, encountered a number of problems with its US publishers, including its portrayal of a drunken judge, occasional muggings and US anti-violence campaigns (which resulted in the gangsters guns being painted out). The strip was dropped by mutual agreement towards the end of 1974.

Salisbury then created a new set of characters with an Australian background. His strip, Old Timer, made its first appearance in The Daily Telegraph in October 1974. In July 1975 The Sun News-Pictorial included it as a trial replacement for Les Dixon's Bluey and Curley, following Dixon's retirement. Over time Salisbury introduced a range of new characters including Snake, in 1976, who gradually took over the comic to the point where in 1978 the name of the strip was changed to Snake Tales. The comic has been cited as the "first new Australian comic since the 1930s" and also as "the start of a different era in Australian cartooning". His work was the basis for the "Art and Sols" exhibition at the Queen Victoria Museum and Art Gallery in late 2006, which in turn formed the basis for the education guide of the same name. His strips are held by the Michigan State University Libraries in their collections.

In 2000, the American basketball team Rio Grande Valley Vipers adopted his character 'Snake' as their official mascot, the first time an Australian cartoon character has been so adopted.

He currently resides in Launceston, Tasmania in Australia.

== Bibliography ==
- Sols (1977). Snake!! : selected strips from The Old Timer cartoon. Boomer Books. ISBN 978-0-9596460-1-6.
- Sols (1978). Snake too!! : selected strips from the Snake Tales cartoon. Boomer Books. ISBN 978-0-9596460-2-3.
- Sols (1979). Snake tree!!. Boomer Books. ISBN 978-0-9596460-3-0.
- Sols (1980). Sunday Snake. Boomer Books. ISBN 978-0-9596460-5-4.
- Sols (1980). Snake paw!! : selected strips from the Snake Tales cartoon. Boomer Books. ISBN 978-0-9596460-4-7.
- Sols (1981). Snake live!! : selected strips from the Snake Tales cartoon. Boomer Books. ISBN 978-0-9596460-6-1.
- Sols (1983). Snake fix !! : selected strips from the Snake tales cartoon. Budget Books. ISBN 978-0-86801-115-8.
- Sols (1984). The best of Snake. No. 1. Everyone's gotta friend. Budget Books. ISBN 978-0-86801-107-3.
- Sols (1985). Introducing Snake. Ravette. ISBN 978-0-906710-70-8.
- Sols (1987). Snake : Love at First Slight. Budget Books. ISBN 978-0-86801-912-3.
- Sols (1988). Snake charmers. Budget Books. ISBN 978-0-7323-0143-9.
- Sols (1988). Snake memoirs : Hiss story. Budget Books. ISBN 978-0-7323-0144-6.
- Sols (1988). Snake for P.M. Budget Books. ISBN 978-0-7323-0145-3.
- Sols (1988). Snake : take me I'm yours. Budget Books. ISBN 978-0-7323-0142-2.
