= Snake Tales =

Comic strip

- Author: Allan Salisbury (aka Sols)
- Current status/schedule: daily gag panel
- Launch date: 25 April 1974
- Alternate name: The Old Timer
- Genre: humor

Snake Tales (also known as simply Snake, after the main character) is a gag-a-day comic strip written by Australian cartoonist Allan Salisbury.

== Publication history ==
Snake Tales was originally titled The Old Timer and was first published in The Daily Telegraph on 25 April 1974. The initial group of characters featured: The Old Timer, an elderly bloke with a long thirst and a reluctance to shout for beers; The Con Man; The Kangaroo, who constantly avoids being killed for food; the Flyin' Doc; and The Last Lost Tribesman and his Wife, who are determined to stay lost.

In July 1975 The Sun News-Pictorial published the strip as a replacement for Les Dixon's Bluey and Curley. Sols gradually added characters including Crazy Croc, Lillie (the Old Timer's distant admirer), a devious butcher, a group of duck hunters, the comic strip did not make a great impression until the introduction of the character 'Snake'. Snake was first introduced in 1975 and gradually gained greater prominence to the point where the name of the strip was changed to Snake Tales in 1978. The strip has now been internationally syndicated and appears in over 450 newspapers (both daily and Sunday editions) worldwide.

When it was syndicated in the United States (through the Newspaper Enterprise Association), Sols was asked to re-draw Lady Snake, as her "two lumps" were said to be offensive. He drew her with a bikini top instead.

== Story and characters ==
The strip is set in an unspecified location in the Australian outback. Occasionally a shot of a traditional outback pub by itself on a lone road is seen.

The principal characters include:

- Snake: a not very smart venomous snake.
- Lady Snake: the Snake's girlfriend.
- The Flyin' Doc: a pilot with the Royal Flying Doctor Service
