= Vic Smith (Australian footballer) =

Australian rules footballer

Personal information
- Full name: Victor Leslie Smith
- Born: 13 July 1893; Albert Park, Victoria
- Died: 25 February 1972 (aged 78); Elwood, Victoria
- Original team: Albert Park

Playing career^{1}
Years	Club	Games (Goals)
1920	South Melbourne	12 (2)
- ^{1} Playing statistics correct to the end of 1920.

Victor Leslie Smith (13 July 1893 – 25 February 1972) was an Australian rules footballer who played with South Melbourne in the Victorian Football League (VFL).
