= Doug Dowling =

Australian rules footballer

Personal information
- Full name: James Douglas Dowling
- Born: 17 September 1922
- Died: 14 May 2013 (aged 90)
- Height: 168 cm (5 ft 6 in)
- Weight: 70 kg (154 lb)

Playing career^{1}
Years	Club	Games (Goals)
1946	South Melbourne	4 (1)
- ^{1} Playing statistics correct to the end of 1946.

James Douglas 'Doug' Dowling (17 September 1922 – 14 May 2013) was an Australian rules footballer who played with South Melbourne in the Victorian Football League (VFL).

After playing originally with Richmond Seconds, Dowling transferred to Williamstown in the VFA in 1945 and was first rover in that year's premiership win over Port Melbourne. Early in the 1946 season he crossed to South Melbourne but returned to Williamstown in 1947 where he enjoyed his finest season, booting 58 goals, finishing runner-up to Reg Harley in the Seagulls' best and fairest award and taking out the Williamstown Advertiser best player award. He was cleared to Oakleigh in July 1948.
