= Drongo (horse) =

Australian racehorse

- Drongo before the Adelaide Cup (1925)
- Sire: Lanius (IRE)
- Grandsire: Llangibby (IRE)
- Dam: Lys d'Or (GB)
- Damsire: Aurum (AUS)
- Sex: Stallion
- Foaled: 1 August 1920
- Died: After 18 June 1926
- Country: Australia
- Colour: Bay
- Owner: Dorothy Wood
- Earnings: £2,200

Drongo (1 August 1920 – after 18 June 1926) was a famous Australian thoroughbred racehorse. He is most well known for being the origin behind the Australian slang term 'drongo' to mean someone who's 'clumsy', 'slow-witted', or even a 'no-hoper'.

== Background ==
Drongo was a bay horse who was based in Melbourne. He was sired by Lanius, a stud from Ireland, and was born to the British-bred mare Lys d'Or.

He was named after the Papua New Guinean bird the spangled drongo.

== Racing Career ==
Two images of the 1923 Victoria Derby: (left) Drongo is seventh place, (right) Drongo is second place.

Picture of 'Brownie', a dog who resided in George Tantram's stables in Caulfield

Drongo's first race was in 1923. Before the Melbourne Cup of that year, it was reported that his racing silks would be black with a blue sash and a black cap.

A contemporary news report records Drongo as having placed second five times and third seven times, but gives no numbers of starts, recent news articles have claimed he had 37 starts. However, Drongo is only recorded as having run in 31 races over his career.

By the end of his three-year-long career, he had earned £2,200 (equivalent to $115,640 in 2025).

During 1924 he stayed at George Tantram's stables in Caulfield, Victoria. The resident dog 'Brownie' was reported as being a companion to Drongo.

== Racing statistics ==
Date	Track	Race	Distance	Finish	Jockey	First place	Ref.
18 Aug 1923	Flemington	Three Year Old Handicap	~1600m	0	E. O'Sullivan	Graculus	
1 Sep 1923	Caulfield	Memsie Stakes	~1800m	3	A. Wilson	Maid of the Mist	
6 Oct 1923	Flemington	October Stakes	~2000m	5	J. Daniels	Whittier	
15 Oct 1923	Caulfield	Caulfield Guineas	~1600m	6	R. Lewis	King Carnival	
3 Nov 1923	Flemington	Victoria Derby	~2400m	2	R. Lewis	Frances Tressady	
6 Nov 1923	Flemington	Melbourne Cup	~3200m	12	E. Simmons	Bitalli	
16 Feb 1924	Caulfield	St. George's Stakes	~1800m	0	R. Lewis	The Hawk	
23 Feb 1924	Caulfield	Woodcliff Handicap	~2200m	0	R. Lewis	Englefield	
1 Mar 1924	Flemington	St. Leger Stakes	~2800m	2	R. Lewis	Sandringham	
8 Mar 1924	Flemington	King's Plate	~3200m	4	R. Lewis	Harvest King	
15 Mar 1924	Caulfield	St. Kilda Cup	~2400m	4	R. Lewis	Switch	
5 April 1924	Rosehill	Rosehill Club Handicap	~2400m	3	R. Lewis	Mirthmaker	
12 April 1924	Randwick	A.J.C. St. Leger	~2800m	3	R. Lewis	Lady Valais	
26 April 1924	Randwick	A.J.C. Plate	~3600m	0	R. Lewis	Rapine	
16 Aug 1924	Moonee Valley	August Handicap	~2000m	4	W. Duncan	San Antonio	
30 Aug 1924	Mentone	Mentone Handicap	~2000m	0		Beeline	
6 Sep 1924	Caulfield	Memsie Stakes	~1800m	0	W. Duncan	Englefield	
4 Oct 1924	Caulfield	October Stakes	~1800m	0	J. Daniels	Whittier	
15 Oct 1924	Caulfield	Herbert Power Stakes	~2200m	3	W. Duncan	Easingwold	
1 Nov 1924	Flemington	Hotham Handicap	~2400m	0	G. Young	Lilypond	
4 Nov 1924	Flemington	Melbourne Cup	~3200m	0	G. Young	Backwood	
21 Feb 1925	Caulfield	Woodcliff Handicap	~2200m	0	H. Tantram	Lemina	
28 Feb 1925	Flemington	Brunswick Stakes	~2000m	3	A. Reed	Llanthony	
7 Mar 1925	Flemington	Northcote Handicap	~2400m	2	A. Reed	King Pan	
14 Mar 1925	Caulfield	St. Kilda Cup	~2400m	4	A. Reed	Jackstaff	
21 Mar 1925	Moonee Valley	Moonee Ponds Handicap	~2400m	3	W. Duncan	Valwyne	
13 Apr 1925	Williamstown	W.R.C. Easter Cup	~2400m	0		Gay Serenader	
18 Apr 1925	Caulfield	Glenhuntly Cup	~2200m	3	H. Tantram	Susie Pye	
9 May 1925	Morphettville	Fisher Handicap	~2000m	2	W. Duncan	Stralia	
13 May 1925	Morphettville	Adelaide Cup	~2600m	4	W. Duncan	Stralia	
16 May 1925	Morphettville	S.A.J.C. Handicap	~2400m	2	W. Duncan	Wycherley	

== Retirement ==
Drongo retired in 1925, his last race being the S.A.J.C. Handicap where he placed second.

In 1926 it was reported that he had been bitten by a venomous snake and subsequently died; however, later that same year it was reported that he was still alive and recovering.

== In popular culture ==
During his career, Australian cartoonist Samuel Garnet Wells depicted him in a number of his popular political cartoons as 'Drongo Mk. I', ridiculing the ongoing support behind him despite having never won a race. His name began being used as an insult after his retirement, Australian Folklore describes that "Thereafter, anyone slow-witted or clumsy was referred to as a 'drongo'," with the name becoming nationally used as a reference to 'no-hopers' during World War II. The poet Len Fox wrote a poem about him in 1958 where he mentions that not everyone is a winner, and so people are not that different from Drongo.

Various political cartoons involving Drongo by Samuel Garnet Wells published in The Herald during the 1920s.

== Pedigree ==
Pedigree of Drongo, bay horse, foaled 1 August 1920 in Australia
Sire =Lanius (IRE)	=Llangibby (IRE)	=Wildflower (IRE)	=Gallinule (GB)
Sire =Lanius (IRE)	=Llangibby (IRE)	=Wildflower (IRE)	=Tragedy (GB)
Sire =Lanius (IRE)	=Llangibby (IRE)	=Concussion (GB)	=Reverberation (GB)
Sire =Lanius (IRE)	=Llangibby (IRE)	=Concussion (GB)	=Astwith (GB)
Sire =Lanius (IRE)	=Mesange (GB)	=Persimmon (GB)	=St. Simon (GB)
Sire =Lanius (IRE)	=Mesange (GB)	=Persimmon (GB)	=Perdita (GB)
Sire =Lanius (IRE)	=Mesange (GB)	=Golden Tresses (GB)	=Orvieto (GB)
Sire =Lanius (IRE)	=Mesange (GB)	=Golden Tresses (GB)	=Coiffure (GB)
Dam =Lys d'Or (GB)	=Aurum (AUS)	=Trenton (NZ)	=Musket (GB)
Dam =Lys d'Or (GB)	=Aurum (AUS)	=Trenton (NZ)	=Frailty (AUS)
Dam =Lys d'Or (GB)	=Aurum (AUS)	=Aura (AUS)	=Richmond (AUS)
Dam =Lys d'Or (GB)	=Aurum (AUS)	=Aura (AUS)	=Instep (GB)
Dam =Lys d'Or (GB)	=Lioness (GB)	=St. Serf (GB)	=St. Simon (GB)
Dam =Lys d'Or (GB)	=Lioness (GB)	=St. Serf (GB)	=Feronia (GB)
Dam =Lys d'Or (GB)	=Lioness (GB)	=Leonie (GB)	=Plebeian (GB)
Dam =Lys d'Or (GB)	=Lioness (GB)	=Leonie (GB)	=Olton (GB)

In the pedigree, symbols before a horse's name mean the horse was foaled in one country but subsequently stood at stud in another.

- Drongo was inbred 3 × 3 to St. Simon, meaning that this stallion appears twice in the third generation of his pedigree.
