= Margaret Gurney (artist) =

Australian artist

- Born: Margaret Jane Gurney; Melbourne, Australia
- Education: Methodist Ladies' College, Elsternwick; Swinburne Technical College; Phillip Institute of Technology
- Occupation: Artist
- Spouse: Alan Charles Weatherley (m. 1967; died 1986)
- Children: 2
- Father: Alexander George Gurney

Margaret Jane Gurney is an Australian artist who lives and works in Melbourne and is an advocate for Australian arts. She represented Australia at the 2009 Florence Biennale. She was one of the first women to work as a graphic artist in Australian television and one of the first women to work in Australia as an art director in advertising.

Gurney worked extensively as both an educator and as an administrator in community arts, and as a program manager in arts adult education. She established her own studio in Melbourne, and has painted full time for many years.

== Early life and education ==
The daughter of Australian war artist Alex Gurney (1902–1955) — the creator of the legendary Bluey and Curley cartoon — and Junee Gurney (1909–1984), née Grover, youngest daughter of the journalist Montague "Monty" MacGregor Grover (1870–1943), and Ada Grover (1877–1928), née Goldberg, Margaret Jane Gurney was born in Melbourne.

She had three elder siblings: John, Jennifer, and Susan.

Gurney was educated at:

- Elsternwick State School
- Methodist Ladies' College, Elsternwick
- Swinburne Technical College, in Hawthorn, gaining a Certificate in Art (conferred on 16 August 1962), and a Diploma of Advertising Art (conferred on 11 August 1965),
- Phillip Institute of Technology, in Preston, gaining her Post Graduate Diploma in Community Education and Development, in 1985

During her time as a student she won a number of prizes for her art, including:

- At MLC, she won the Drawing Prize for original art work in 1958.
- At Swinburne, she won the Fourth Year Art School Class Prize in 1963.

=== Drama ===
Gurney took the part of Concha Puerto, the major protagonist in The Women Have Their Way (an English version of the Quintero brothers' es:Puebla de las Mujeres), in MLC's (August 1959) annual school play.

At Swinburne she had a number of leading roles in each of the college's first two student revues (each produced by Brian Robinson): In the Pink (1962), and Get Well Soon (1963).

== Career ==
After completing her formal studies at Swinburne, she worked at two small advertising agencies: as a Graphic Artist with Curtis Stevens and Charles Billich, Melbourne, in 1964, and in Advertising Marketing with George Santos, Melbourne, from 1964 to 1966.

She was, then, employed as a graphic artist at Channel O, Melbourne from 1966 to 1967, and as television art director at George Patterson's advertising agency, in Melbourne, from 1967 to 1969.

Working as an artist from her time at Swinburne, she has exhibited in solo and group exhibitions both nationally and internationally. She represented Australia at the Florence Biennale in 2009. After establishing her own studio, she has painted full time for many years.

She is an exhibiting member of the Melbourne Society of Women Painters and Sculptors, the Victorian Artists Society, the Contemporary Art Society, and several other Melbourne art societies.

=== Educator ===
Gurney has worked extensively as both an educator and as an administrator in community arts, and as a program manager in arts adult education long before the establishment of Creative Victoria in 2015.

From her (1979) experience as a sessional lecturer at the Phillip Institute, Melbourne, where she lectured to art and design students, she developed a strong interest in both formal and informal arts education; an interest that has remained with her ever since.

== Alex Gurney's heritage ==
In addition to her own work as an artist, Gurney has been extremely active in reviving, maintaining, and preserving the artistic legacy of her father, Alex Gurney (1902-1955).

In 2007 Gurney was the means through which the significant collection of papers and works of Alex Gurney, accession number MS 13561, were able to be acquired by the State Library of Victoria.

== Awards ==
- 2005: Melbourne Savage Club Invitation Art Prize for Painting
- 2007: The Kenneth Jack Memorial Drawing Award (Australian Guild of Realist Artists): the award's inaugural winner
- 2014: The Constance Wu Award (Melbourne Women Painters and Sculptors Society Artist of the Year)
- 2018: Fellowship Award (Victorian Artists' Society)

== Personal life ==
She married cinematographer Alan Charles Weatherley (1937-1986) on 8 April 1967. She has two children.

== Works ==
- Gurney, M., My Dad: Alex Gurney 1902-1955, Margaret Gurney, (Black Rock), 2006.
- Roennfeldt, M.J. (ed.), Gurney, M. (illustrator), Drama in Action for Secondary Schools: Book III, (Melbourne), Thomas Nelson, 1969.

== References and notes ==
=== Sources ===
- Man Who Pulled Girl from Sea Reopens Club, The Age, (Monday, 14 January 1957), p.5.
- "Margaret Gurney", in Tunberg, Despina (curator) and Tunberg, Thomas (ed.), International Contemporary Masters IV, World Wide Art Books, INC, (Santa Barbara, California), 2011, pp.128-129. ISBN 978-0-9802-0793-4
- Hollingworth, Sarah, "Spirit of Creativity", Wellplan, No.22, (Autumn 2013), pp.14-15.
