= Peter Russell-Clarke =

Australian chef, author and illustrator (1935–2025)

- Born: 19 September 1935; Ballarat, Victoria, Australia
- Died: 4 July 2025 (aged 89); Melbourne, Australia
- Occupations: Chef; author; cartoonist; television personality

Peter Russell-Clarke (19 September 1935 – 4 July 2025) was an Australian chef, restaurateur, cookbook author and illustrator, artist, cartoonist, television presenter and media personality.

Russell-Clarke was known for his television program Come and Get It and his rogue down-to-earth "Aussie larrikin" charm and his trademark catchphrases including "G'day", "Rippers". "You beaut" and "Where's the cheese?" He had been a food ambassador to the United Nations.

== Life and career ==
Peter Russell-Clarke was born in Ballarat on 19 September 1935. He was generally considered Australia's first celebrity chef, known principally through his television cooking shows. He hosted a five-minute television show called Come and Get It which aired on the Australian Broadcasting Corporation for nine years during the 1980s, broadcasting over 900 episodes. He frequently used the Australian greeting "G'day" at the start of segments of Come and Get It. He authored and published around 35 cookbooks and books about food. He also illustrated several books, including works of fiction for children., as well as being a food consultant for numerous magazines including New Idea and Woman's Day.

Russell-Clarke was an accomplished painter, and began his career as a freelance cartoonist, he created political cartoons and the comic strip Ben Bowyang for The Herald in Melbourne.

From 1975 to 1979, Russell-Clarke was the spokesman for campaigns on behalf of the Victorian Egg Board and the Australian Dairy Corporation. Victorian egg sales rose 5% in three years.

Clarke died after complications from a stroke in Melbourne, Australia, on 4 July 2025, at the age of 89.

== Selected publications ==
- New Idea Cookbook (Southdown Press) ISBN 0-86860-280-9
- The Awful Australian 'arry (John Walker Publications, 1969) (by Robert King Crawford; illustrated by Peter Russell-Clarke)
- The World is Flat: An Authentic Misrepresentation of Australian History (1972) ISBN 0-9599084-0-4 (by Robert King Crawford; illustrated by Peter Russell-Clarke)
- Getting Across: A Guide to Good Speaking and Writing (Edward Arnold [Australia], 1978) OCLC 27558507 (by Maurice Brown; drawings by Peter Russell-Clarke)
- Peter Russell-Clarke's Egg Cook Book (Schwartz, 1979) ISBN 0-86753-000-6
- Peter Russell-Clarke's Come and Get It Cookbook: The Book of the TV Series (Macmillan, 1984) ISBN 0-333-38035-5
- Peter Russell-Clarke's Freshwater Trout Cookbook (Pan Macmillan Australia, January 1985)
- Peter Russell-Clarke's Honey Cookbook (Sun Papermac, 1985) ISBN 0-7251-0477-5
- Come and Get it Again: More Fresh and Easy Recipes From the TV Show (Australian Broadcasting Commission, January 1987) ISBN 0-642-53068-8
- Food, the Dictionary (Sun Books, 1985) ISBN 0-7251-0500-3 (written and illustrated by Peter Russell-Clarke)
- Aussie Outdoor Cookbook: In Association with the Australian Red Cross (Lothian, 1998) ISBN 0-85091-939-8
- Pie of the Day (Lothian Books, October 1998) ISBN 0-85091-882-0
- The Magic of Lemons (Information Australia, 2000) ISBN 1-86350-343-9
- Magic of Olive Oil (Information Australia, 2001) ISBN 1-86350-363-3
- Food Encyclopedia: Everything You Need to Know About Every Food (BAS Publishing, December 2005) ISBN 1-920910-65-4
- The Adventures of Harry Lombard: The Magic Suitcase (Jellisen Publishing Australia, 2005) ISBN 0-9758133-0-7 (by Michael Krape; drawings by Peter Russell-Clarke)
- Waltzing Matilda (Alto Books, 2008) ISBN 978-0-9804914-9-4 (by A.B. Banjo Paterson; illustrator, Peter Russell-Clarke)
