= Esmond Dorney =

Australian architect (1906–1991)

- Born: 17 September 1906
- Died: 25 December 1991 (aged 85)
- Citizenship: Australia
- Education: University of Melbourne, Brighton Technical College
- Occupations: RAF Pilot, Architect
- Children: Paddy Dorney
- Awards: Tasmania Award for Enduring Architecture 2017, 2026
- Buildings: Dorney House at Fort Nelson, St Pius X Church

James Henry Esmond Dorney (17 September 1906 – 25 December 1991) was an Australian architect, known for a series of notable Streamline Moderne apartment blocks in Melbourne in the 1930s, and a series of inventive Modernist houses in Tasmania in the 1950s and 60s, where he has been credited with bringing Modernism to the island state. He is best known for the second house he built for himself in 1966 (reconstructed after being destroyed by fire in 1978), a remarkable design on a hilltop overlooking Hobart, Tasmania. Owned by the Hobart City Council since 2006, it is regularly open to the public.

== Early life ==
He was born to Marie Louise Kiernan and James Henry Dorney in Melbourne, Victoria, and grew up from his teenage years in Elwood.

Dorney studied Architecture at the University of Melbourne in 1925–1926, until he was expelled for racing his Delage around the university campus. He later claimed to have been disenchanted in any case, dismissing the course as "a meaningless pursuit of Classical Revival."

He enrolled instead at Brighton Technical College, and commenced articles in the office of Australia's then most radical architects, Walter Burley Griffin and Marion Mahoney Griffin.

The first project attributed to Dorney dates from 1929. In 1931 he established his own office, just as the full effects of the Great Depression were being felt, and there was little work. He spent some of his time in the period taking art classes, and studying engineering with Henry Allen, design engineer for the prominent firm of Johns & Waygood. In 1931 he married local girl Margaret Lambie, and the couple had two sons, John and Earl.

== Architectural career ==
With the help of his mother and his father-in-law as clients, he began designing apartment blocks, especially in the Elwood area, eventually completing perhaps about 18 in that suburb alone. His early output was prolific, including houses, flats and maisonettes in Brighton, Caulfield, Armadale, Malvern, Kew and Middle Park, and his own house (demolished) in Sandringham. His early designs were occasionally Tudor Revival, but he also developed his own distinctive style, that combined Arts & Crafts and Prairie Style influences, employing panels of horizontal banded tapestry bricks and his own unique angular balusters. Starting with Windermere in 1936, many of his designs were strikingly Moderne; they featured dynamic compositions of contrasting horizontals and verticals, often with thrusting semi-circular ended balconies or window bays.

The projects for his relatives began with the conversion of the family home Chenier, into flats in 1934 for his mother; a later project was the 1939 beach front flats at 751 Ormond Esplanade named St Kiernan's, a play on his mother's maiden name Kiernan. In 1948 the name St Kiernan's was transferred to another block of flats designed by Esmond at 57 Ormond Esplanade (an interesting Modernist design with huge picture windows), but neither block is now known by that name. In 1940 he designed the Garden Court flats on Marine Parade for his father-in-law, John Robert Lambie, who lived there for the next 20 years.

== World War II ==
Dorney's career as an architect was interrupted by World War 2, when he enlisted and served as a pilot in the Royal Air Force Volunteer Reserve from 1940 to 1945.

At the fall of Singapore, he was redeployed to Java and worked behind Japanese lines, establishing secret radar installations. Spending some time in a POW camp, he eventually escaped and remained with Chinese guerillas until the end of the war. This period of forced design inactivity generated a revolution in his architecture.

== Post World War II ==
Dorney returned to Australia, and moved from his home in Melbourne to Hobart, Tasmania, citing health and personal reasons. He designed a series of remarkable houses, beginning with his first tiny, circular house on the Fort Nelson constructed in 1949, and became the most noted post-war modernist architect in his adopted state. He did however continue to work in Victoria, designing amongst other projects Sandringham Hospital (1956–64), Caritas Cristi Hospice (with Stephenson and Turner)(1962).

His post war modernist projects in Tasmania included a number of innovative designs; his own houses at Fort Nelson were based on a circular plan (1949, 1966, both destroyed by fire, with the second house rebuilt in 1978), and another version of the circular plan is the Richardson House (1954). The Young House (1958) is one of his best known, with a structure of wide arches, a theme repeated on the Tate House (1960). The Jarvis House (1959) has a unique roof composed of a series of shallow arches, an idea repeated on the Thomas House (1960). Other notable designs include the arch-roofed St Pius X Church (1957), and opposing skillion roofs of Snows Dry Cleaners (1960). Other and later houses were more conventional, but usually with refined slim lines and details. His last house was the Fisher House (1989), completed after his death in 1991.

== Notable works ==
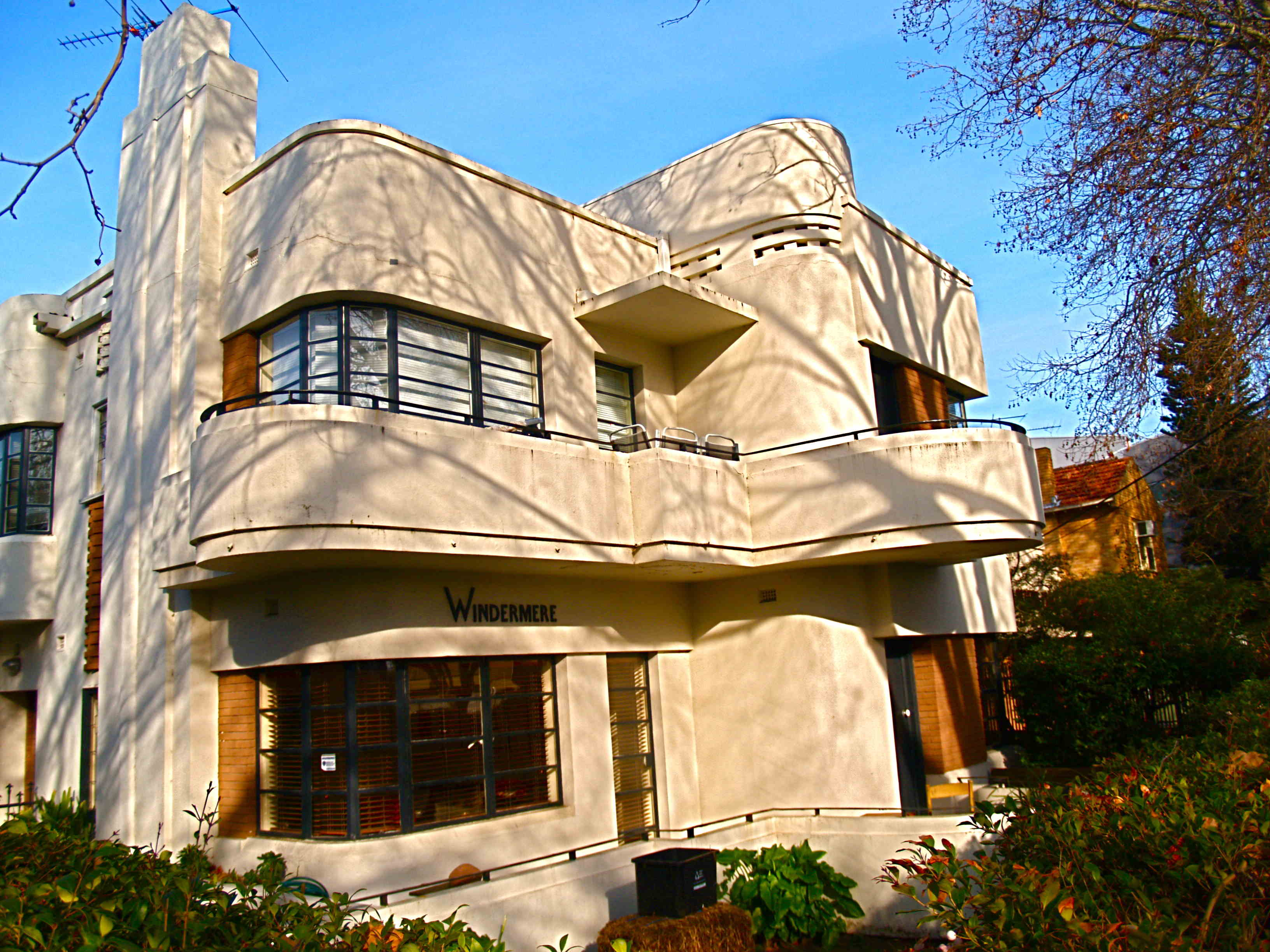
Windermere, Esplanade Elwood

=== Windermere ===
The Windermere flats at 49 Broadway, Elwood, were built in 1936. This celebrated block of flats in the Moderne style, with a dynamic interplay or horizontals, verticals and projecting curved balconies, creating a striking street presence, is one of the earliest Moderne flats added to the Victorian Heritage Register, in 1992.

=== St Kiernan's Flats ===
This striking block of flats at 51 Ormond Esplanade was constructed in 1939, and like Windermere employs a complexity of horizontals and verticals, but uses only rectilinear elements, including long horizontal windows, some wrapping around corners, reminiscent of European modernist design. The triple fronted façade is composed of a north and south wing and a projected central portion featuring a large brick chimney giving the building a strong vertical element.

In 2018 St Kiernan's was completely facaded, leaving only the main exterior walls, and new flats with different arrangements built behind.

=== Dalcrombie ===
Long mis-attributed to Harry Norris, this is possibly the most extraordinary Moderne private house in Victoria. Located on a large estate in the hills outside Melbourne at 11 Warwick Farm Rd, Olinda, it was built in c1939 for optometrist Earl Coles, a partner in the then well known optometrists Coles & Garrard, and originally called Lanhydrock.

The design exploits reinforced concrete to an unusual degree, with boldly cantilevered semi-circular window bays and an extensive first floor deck supported on just a few columns, allowing wide window openings below, and a tall circular stair tower largely composed of glass blocks. The house features multiple projecting semi-circular elements, a favoured element of Dorney's Moderne designs, projecting out from a central cuboid volume, with attached vertical elements, to create an elaborate dynamic composition.

A large 1980s single storey addition to the north side features an almost matching projecting semi-circular window element, adding to the complexity.

=== Young House ===
Built in 1959 in the Hobart suburb of Sandy Bay, this was Dorney's most widely celebrated residential projects before his own house became publicly accessible. It is popularly known as the 'Butterfly House' because the most striking feature is the use of a long low steel arch which forms both roof shape and structure, with a secondary half arch rising from the centre in the opposite direction. Listed by Heritage Tasmania, internal alterations were permitted in 1999, and additions in 2009, in part because the family wished to keep occupying the house they enjoyed, the alterations were sympathetic, and because they were "based on the principles found in the existing house and in Dorney's own writings...", for instance that "A house should be planned like a machine, but a home is much more than a machine, and can in many ways express its owner's personality."

=== Dorney House ===
Probably Dorney's most well-known and celebrated design, "one of the great modern houses of Australia", is his own house built on the circular foundations of the former Fort Nelson gun emplacements in the foothills of Mount Nelson, south of central Hobart. First constructed in 1966, it was destroyed by bushfire and redesigned in 1978. The design centres on an exploded radial form of 12 sides, each segment with an arched roofed, creating a flower like form. Supported on a light steel frame, the north, the east and much of the south and west is fully glazed, providing the living spaces with panoramic views over the city of Hobart, the harbour, the Derwent estuary and Storm Bay and the Southern Ocean.

The City of Hobart purchased the house and site in 2006, and it has been opened occasionally for events and is available for public booking. In 2018 the City Council was exploring options for a more permanent use for the house and land. After many years of little use and ongoing maintenance costs Hobart City Council was reviewing options in 2025 regarding the future of the property. At the 2026 Tasmanian Architecture Awards the house was awarded the Tasmania Award for Enduring Architecture.

== List of works ==
=== Victoria ===
Largely drawn from a list created by Dorney relatives in 2018.

- Devon Lodge, 1929, 8 Clowes St, South Yarra, house (Tudor Revival).
- Conversion of family house (Chenier) into flats, 1934, 8 Glenhuntly Road, Elwood. (Arts & Crafts style)
- Surrey Court Flats, 1933, 71 Ormond Road, Elwood (Tudor Revival)
- De Mont Rose Flats, 1933, 1 Broadway, Elwood.
- L'Espoir Flats, 1934, 39 Shelley St, Elwood.
- Garden View Flats, 1934, 60 Blessington St, St Kilda, Flats.
- Flats, 1935, 19 Wrexham Road, Windsor (Tudor Revival)
- Colwyn maisonettes, 1937, 1263 High St, Malvern (Prairie style).
- Wahpeton Maisonettes, 1935, 25 Hampden Rd, Armadale (demolished)
- Windermere Flats, 1936, 49 Broadway, Elwood
- Maisonettes, 1936, 11 Alexandra Ave, Sth Yarra.
- Nimmo & Florence Court Flats, unknown, 51-53 Nimmo St, Middle Park
- Flats, 1936, 17 Vautier St, Elwood.
- Mena Court Flats, 1936, 81 Nimmo St, Middle Park.
- Deltham Flats, 1936, 3 Meredith St, Elwood,
- St Anne's Flats, 1937–8, 1 Park Street, South Yarra.
- Malaru Maisonettes, 1937, 33-39 Campbell Street, Brighton (Prairie Style)
- Coolullah, Flats, 1937, Coolullah Ave, South Yarra (demolished).
- Northey Flats, 1937, 261-263 Williams Road, South Yarra.
- Dalcrombie (Llanhydroch), 1938, Olinda, Victoria.
- Antigone Flats, 1939, 34 Docker Street, Elwood
- St Kiernan's Flats (1), 1939, 51 Ormond Esplanade, Elwood (demolished except for facade).
- Dorney House, 1939, Lefevre Street, Sandringham (demolished).
- House, 1939, 310 St Kilda St, Brighton (demolished)
- House, unknown, 9 Martin Place, Brighton (demolished).
- Flats, unknown, 252 New St, Brighton (demolished).
- Maisonettes, unknown, 466 Hawthorn Rd, South Caulfield.
- Aldabaran, 15 Park Crescent, Aberfeldie.
- Garden Court flats, 1940, 73 Marine Parade, Elwood.
- St Kiernan's Flats (2), 1946–8 (designed by 1940), 57 Ormond Esplanade, Elwood.
- Caritas Christi, 1962, 104 Studley Park Rd, Kew, Hospice (in collaboration)
- Sandringham & District Memorial Hospital, 1956–1964, Bluff Rd, Sandringham (in collaboration)
- Mesley Hall, 1965, Ogilvy St, Leongatha, Hall (in collaboration).

=== Tasmania ===
(not exhaustive)

- Nazareth House Retirement Home, 1952, St Leonards
- Richardson House, 1954, 48 Rosny Esplanade, Rosny
- Dorney Beach Shack, 1957, Park Beach, Dodges Ferry
- Snow's Dry Cleaning, 1957, Glenorchy
- Pius X Church, 1957, 98 Channel Hwy, Taroona, Hobart
- The Dorney Houses, 1948 (dem), 1966 (dem), 1978 Fort Nelson
- Young House, 1958, 538 Churchill Avenue, Lower Sandy Bay.
- Tate House, 1958, 104 Flinders Esplanade, Taroona
- Jarvis House, 1959, 11 Alexandra Esplanade, Bellerive
- Thomas House, 1960, 27 Casuarina Crescent, Bertiedale, Hobart
- Paul Dorney House, Willowdene Ave, Sandy Bay (no date)
- House, 37 Oakleigh Avenue, Taroona (no date)

== Posthumous recognition ==
In 2008 James Jones, then president of the Tasmanian chapter of the Australian Institute of Architects posthumously awarded Esmond Dorney the President's Prize, which was accepted by his son, Paddy Dorney, stating "Dorney returns us to the worth of the architecture, saying something about humanity, who we are through how we build and how we live in the landscape." The Tasmanian chapter subsequently named their highest residential design award the Esmond Dorney Award for Residential Architecture, Houses (New). He is now possibly the most celebrated and well known Tasmanian architectural figure, credited with bringing modernism to the island state.
