= Samuel Garnet Wells =

Australian cartoonist

Sam Wells
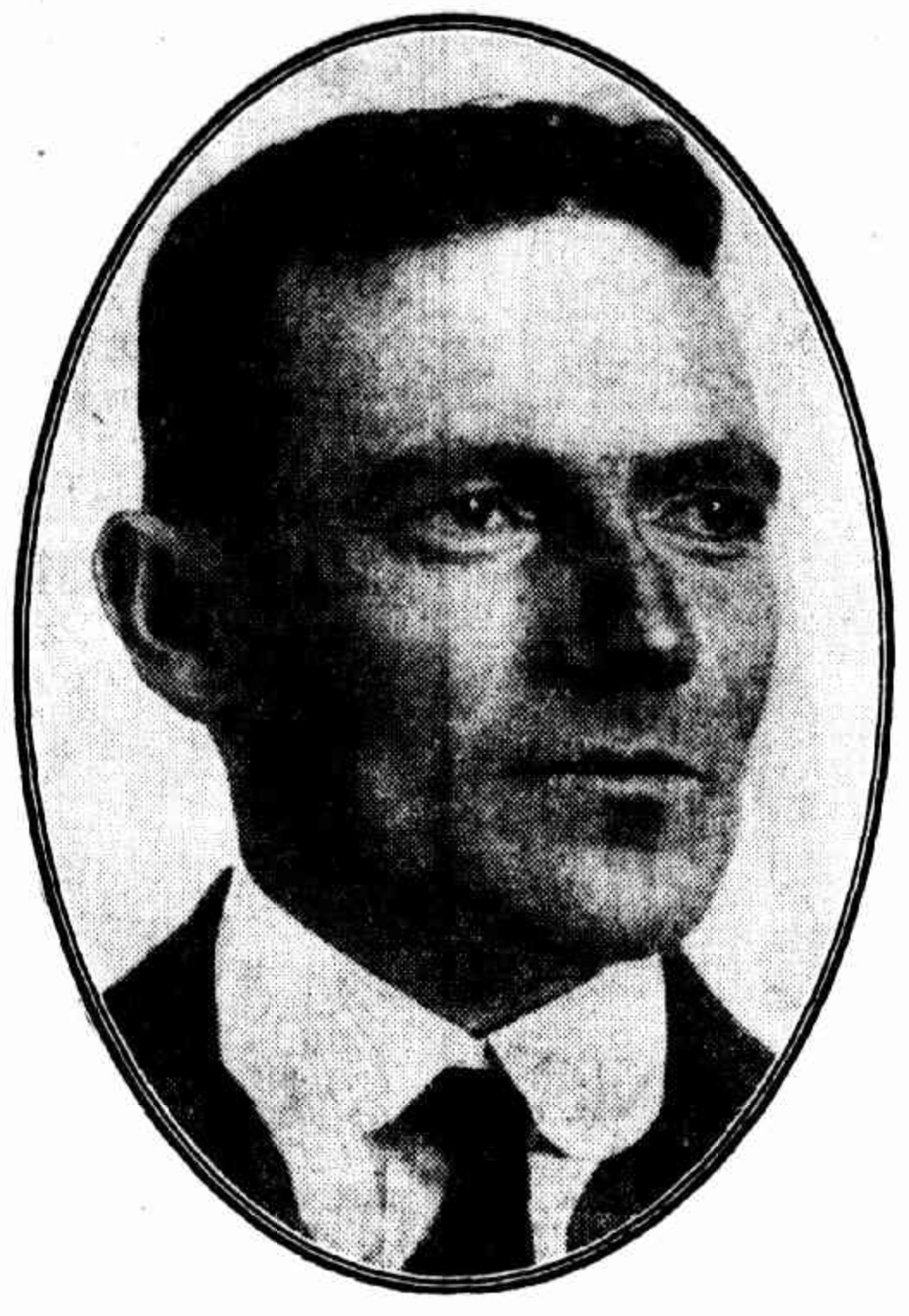
- Sam Wells in June 1922
- Born: Samuel Garnet Wells; 2 February 1885 North Sydney, New South Wales
- Died: 12 March 1972 (aged 87) East Melbourne, Victoria
- Areas: Caricatures, Sporting Cartoons, Political Cartoons
- Spouses: Grace Maud Pike (m.1907; div.1912); Marjorie Elizabeth Egan (m.1912; div.1931); Vera Murray (m.1932)

Samuel Garnet Wells (a.k.a. Samuel Garnet Smith-Wells) (2 February 1885 – 12 March 1972) was an Australian cartoonist, caricaturist, artist, and draughtsman. Over a career of almost half a century, he worked at the Williamstown Chronicle, the Melbourne Punch, the Melbourne Herald, The (Manchester) Daily Dispatch, and the Melbourne Age as a political/editorial and sporting artist.

He was also responsible — in his Herald cartoon of 6 July 1923 — for suggesting that the Geelong Football Club adopt a black cat as its mascot, and adopt the nickname of "The Cats".

== Family ==
The son of the civil engineer Samuel Smith Wells (1851–1904) (a.k.a. Samuel Smith-Wells), and Emmeline Wells (1858–1885), née Little, Samuel Garnet Smith Wells was born in North Sydney, New South Wales, on 2 February 1885.

=== Three marriages ===
He married Grace Maud Pike, in Manly, New South Wales on 9 April 1907; they were divorced in May 1912 (the decree nisi was granted on 30 November 1911).

He married Marjorie Elizabeth Egan (1881–1970), at Fitzroy, Victoria on 5 April 1912; on 17 September 1931, Wells was granted his petition for a decree of nullity of this marriage, (Note: They had not lived together since 1925; see: "The Difficulties of Knowing if One is Married: Strange Case of Melbourne Couple, The (Sydney) Arrow, (6 November 1931), p.2.) on the grounds that, although he had (incorrectly) believed that his earlier marriage had been terminated in November 1911, he had not, in fact, been free to marry until 19 June 1912 (when the decree nisi had been pronounced absolute).

He married Melbourne Artist Vera Murray (1900–1985), at Caulfield, Victoria, on 9 February 1932. They remained together until his death in 1972.

== Education ==
He was educated at Kiama Grammar School.

== Artist ==
External images
- "Preparatory sketch of Australians firing at the German steamer Pfalz which attempted to get through the Melbourne heads on 4th (sic) August 1914", pencil drawing by S. G. Wells in the collection of the National Library of Australia.
- Collection of (approx. 37) theatrical masks painted by Samuel Wells (c.1918) for Bland Holt in recital, in the collection of the State Library Victoria.

(Note: "A rare curiosity [in the National Art Collection] is the rough sketch of the garrison artillery at Queenscliff, Port Phillip Bay, firing at the German ship Pfalz, which was attempting to leave the bay. It was drawn by S. G. Wells, the Melbourne "Herald" artist when he was a gunner at this port. The shot was the first in the Empire fired during the Great War." ("The National Art Collection at Canberra', The (Sydney) Daily Telegraph, (14 December 1927), p.8.)

== Cartoonist ==
Over a career of almost 50 years, Wells worked for a number of publications in Australia and in the U.K.

=== The Williamstown Chronicle ===
In 1919, Krefft (at the time a resident of Williamstown, Victoria) was commissioned by the Williamstown Chronicle to produce a series of caricatures of eminent local citizens.

Forty of these caricatures were published, one each week: the first, that of Frederick Ernest Pincott (1872–1941), the manager of Nugget Polish Co., on 24 May 1919, and the fortieth and final caricature in the series, that of James Lord (1849–1925), manager of the Williamstown Gas Company, on 20 March 1920.

=== The Melbourne Punch ===
Having contributed caricatures to the Melbourne Punch during the war, (Note: For instance: "Wells, S. G. (1917), "B. G. Warr 'In Action': 'Absolutely the finest insurance in the world, madam!'", Melbourne Punch, (27 January 1918), p.8; "Wells, S. G. (1917), "Brigadier-General Stanley: Long-Service Man", Melbourne Punch, (24 January 1918), p.11.) Wells joined its staff after World War I.

=== The Melbourne Herald ===
He worked at the Melbourne Herald as both a political/editorial cartoonist (Note: For instance: Wells, S. G. (1922), "The Modern Bogey Man", (28 April 1922), p. 8.) and as a sporting cartoonist (Note: For instance: Wells, S. G. (1922), "Amateur Champions Past and Present", (3 January 1922), p. 3.) from 1922.

==== 20 June 1923 ====
Driven by the popularity of the humorous fictional "letters from the bush", that regularly featured in the Melbourne Herald, written by C. J. Dennis, supposedly written by Ben Bowyang, a philosophical farmer from "Gunn's Gully", (Note: The first was: Bowyang, Ben, "A Letter from the Bush", The (Melbourne) Herald, (12 June 1922), p. 6.) Wells, the Herald's resident caricaturist, pretended to have visited Gunn's Gully — "Correspondents have frequently asked what Ben Bowyang and Bill Smith are like. This is Wells's impression of them after a visit to Gunns Gully" — and, on 20 June 1923, the Herald presented 'caricatures' of the fictional pair, as if they were, indeed, real people.

Ten years later, based upon Dennis's columns (Note: The last-ever letter written by Ben Bowyang, appeared in the Herald on 30 September 1933: Dennis, C. J. (1933), "Ben Bowyang says Goodbye", The (Melbourne) Herald, (30 September 1933), p. 6.) and Wells's (1923) caricatures, Alex Gurney (at the time also a Herald employee) went on to create the characters for his successful comic strip, the first of which was published on 7 October 1933 (i.e., one week after Bowyang's last letter had been published).

==== 1925 Federal election ====
In relation to Wells's (apparently independent) political/editorial cartoons over his entire career, it is significant that a series of his cartoons, highly critical of the Australian Labor Party in general, and of its leader, Matthew Charlton in particular, were published in relation to the (14 November) 1925 Australian federal election, with the unusual statement "Cartoon drawn, after consultation, to express the views of The Herald, by S. G. Wells, 62 Flinders street, Melbourne", at the foot of each cartoon. (Note: The reason for appending this particular statement to Wells's work at this time was never disclosed.)

==== March 1926 Exhibition ====
On 17 March 1926, an exhibition of nearly 400 examples of Wells's portraits, caricatures, and his sporting and political/editorial cartoons was opened at the New Gallery, 107 Elizabeth Street, Melbourne, by the former Prime Minister of Australia, Billy Hughes, one of Wells's favourite cartoon subjects.

=== The Melbourne Herald ===
He returned to the Herald in January 1941. His first cartoon was published on 14 January 1941, and he continued to work at the Herald until he was forcibly retired, due to the paper's retirement-at-sixty-five policy.

=== The Melbourne Age ===
He moved to Melbourne Age, and contributing a special cartoon, every Monday and Friday, in the newspaper's sports section, until the end of January 1967.

== Death ==
He died at his residence in Powlett Street, East Melbourne, on 12 March 1972.

== Sources ==
- Dietrich, Roger (2011), "Samuel Garnet Wells", Design & Art Australia Online.
- Wells, S. G. (1923), Wells Football Cartoons, Melbourne: The Herald.
- Wells, S. G. (1950), Sam Wells, The Age, (3 November 1950), p. 1.
- "19. Maritime Art Mystery", Melbourne Maritime Heritage Network, February 2023.
