= Come and Get It (TV series) =

Australian health television show (1983-92)

- Created by: Peter Russell-Clarke
- Starring: Peter Russell-Clarke
- Country of origin: Australia
- Original language: English
- No. of episodes: ~900

Production
- Running time: 5 minutes

Original release
- Network: ABC
- Release: 1983 – 1992

Come and Get It is an Australian cooking television series hosted by Peter Russell-Clarke. Screening on the ABC, it ran for nine years and around 900 episodes It was a lifestyle show with a focus on healthy eating and lifestyle. It sometimes featured guests, visited food production sites, explained food history and finished with a cooking segment, all in a five-minute show.
