= Williamstown Advertiser =

The Williamstown Advertiser is a long-running weekly newspaper published in the Melbourne suburb of Williamstown, Victoria from 1874.

== History ==
The arrival of the new paper was welcomed by the Geelong Advertiser in November 1874, noting that among its proprietors was Alfred Thomas Clark MLA, Minister for Customs, so was expected to promote the Protectionist cause. Andrew Curtain (journalist) and Matthew J. Smith (manager) were involved in its production.

Curtain and printer Alfred Gagan purchased the paper; then Curtain became sole proprietor, retired 1927, died 1934.

John F. Bracken was proprietor 1925–1947 (22 years), followed in 1947 by brothers David A. Williams and James P. Williams, both ex-servicemen. They were grandsons of pioneer Theresa Williams.

In 1964 the Advertiser absorbed the Williamstown Chronicle.

== Trove ==
Trove has OCR-scanned photographic copies of most issues of the Williamstown Advertiser from Vol. 2 No. 54 to No. 4529 of 23 December 1954.
