= Tony Rickards =

Australian comedian and actor

- Education: University of Melbourne
- Occupation: Actor

Tony Rickards is an Australian comedian and actor, who has worked in television, film, radio and theatre.

== Early life and education ==
Rickards studied commerce at the University of Melbourne, where he met comedian Steve Vizard. The pair began collaborating in the university comedy/revue scene, while they were members of the Melbourne Law Revue.

== Career ==
Rickards and Vizard began performing off campus, together with pianist Paul Grabowsky, comedian and writer Geoff Street and actor Michael O'Neill, as comedy group The Hardy Perennials. In 1978, the group began their revue The Kookaburra Longjohn Underwear Show at Melbourne's Foibles Theatre Restaurant in Carlton.

Shortly thereafter, Rickards began appearing in films in the 1980s, with a role in Squizzy Taylor (1982), before landing his first lead role alongside John Hargreaves in 1984 TV movie The Great Gold Swindle. In 1985, he acted in the films Robbery and Mud, Bloody Mud, before playing opposite Oliver Reed in 1986 film Castaway.

Notably, Rickards played Con Marasco in the radio series Punter to Punter for eight years, beginning in 1981. The show was developed off the back of a 1980 racing tips segment on a morning sports show. The racehorse Marasco was named after Rickards' character.

On television, Rickards featured in 1984 miniseries Waterfront, with Jack Thompson, Warren Mitchell and Greta Scacchi. He went on to appear in numerous drama series including A Country Practice, G.P., Good Guys, Bad Guys, Halifax f.p., Stingers and Blue Heelers, playing the recurring role of Compo Hayes in the latter. Rickards also made many appearances in television comedy series, including Lano & Woodley, Micallef, BackBerner and Kath & Kim. He featured heavily in the sketch series The Russell Gilbert Show.

Rickards film career continued into the 1990s, with a cameo appearance opposite comedian Jimeoin in 1999 comedy film The Craic. He went on to play Roy Orbison in 2006 U.S. TV movie, Nightmares & Dreamscapes. He has since had roles in Summer Coda (2010), The Cup (2011), TV movie The Mystery of a Hansom Cab (2012), Holding The Man (2015), Pawno (2015) and The Menkoff Method (2016).

Rickards' more recent television credits include further drama series including Wentworth, Miss Fisher's Murder Mysteries, Winners & Losers, Tangle and 2015 miniseries Childhood's End.

Additionally, Rickards performs for the stage. Recent theatre credits include Every Night, Every Night for Frank Theatre Company (2012) and Cock for Melbourne Theatre Company (2014). He has also performed in his own comedy stage shows in Melbourne at venues including The Flying Trapeze, Universal Theatre, Palais Theatre and The Last Laugh, including the 1985 show Tony Rickards Takes a Punt, at the latter.

== Personal life ==
Rickards and Steve Vizard are godfathers to each other’s children.

== Filmography ==
=== Film ===
Year	Title	Role	Notes	Ref.
1982	Squizzy Taylor	Dutch		
1982	The Clinic	Chris		
1985	Wills & Burke	Patton		
1985	Niel Lynne	Tim Marsh		
1994	Miss Taurus		Short film	
1994	This Marching Girl Thing	Policeman	Short film	
1996	My Second Car	Earle	Short film	
1997	Operation Dostoyevsky			
1999	The Craic	Bald Doctor		
2010	Summer Coda	Freddy		
2011	The Cup	Chief Steward		
2013	The Wizard	Gary	Short film	
2015	Holding The Man	Mr O'Connell		
2015	Pawno	Harry		
2016	The Menkoff Method	Trevor		
2017	West of Sunshine	Race Caller		
2018	In the Wake	Bob	Short film	
2019	Ride Like a Girl	Trainer		
2019	The Whistleblower	GPEC Executive		

=== Television ===
Year	Title	Role	Notes	Ref.
1979–1983	The Sullivans	Various	4 episodes	
1984	Waterfront	Snowy Williams	Miniseries, 3 episodes	
1984	The Great Gold Swindle	Peter Mickelberg	TV movie	
1984	Special Squad		1 episode	
1985	Mud, Bloody Mud	Curley	TV movie	
1985	Robbery	Lt. Russ Stevenson (retired)	TV movie	
1986	Sword of Honour	China	Miniseries, 2 episodes	
1986	A Single Life	Sandy	TV movie	
1986	Castaway	Jason		
1988	Pieta	Henry Norrie	TV movie	
1989	A Country Practice	Dr Marshall Doyle	2 episodes	
1990	Mission: Impossible	Mel	1 episode	
1990	The Flying Doctors	Charlie Coombes	1 episode	
1991	Chances	Bob Burchett	1 episode	
1992	Boys from the Bush	Brian	1 episode	
1992	G.P.	Eddie Hogg	1 episode	
1992	Bony	Smooch	1 episode	
1993	The Making of Nothing	Journo	TV movie	
1994–2003	Blue Heelers	Compo Hayes / Reg Taggerty	8 episodes	
1995	Halifax f.p.	George Rayner	1 episode	
1995	Correlli	Officer McAlpine	2 episodes	
1995	The Feds	Bennie Fontaine	Miniseries, 1 episode	
1997	Good Guys, Bad Guys	Det Sgt Forbes	1 episode	
1998–2002	Stingers	Constable Charlie Murray / Miles Vanderhoeven	3 episodes	
1999	Thunderstone	Royal Valenti	2 episodes	
1999	The Adventures of Lano and Woodley	Zachary Wilde	2 episodes	
1999	The Micallef Program	Eckerman	1 episode	
2000	Dogwoman: Dead Dog Walking	Steve Finlay	TV movie	
2000	Russell Gilbert Live	Various	14 episodes	
2001	Russell Gilbert Was Here!	Various	8 episodes	
2002	Kath & Kim	Brian	1 episode	
2002	Bootleg	Fishy Brian	3 episodes	
2003	MDA	Peter Pearce	1 episode	
2004	Loot	Richardson	TV movie	
2005	Wicked Science	Wyatt, Summer	1 episode	
2006	Nightmares & Dreamscapes: From the Stories of Stephen King	Roy Orbison	Miniseries, 1 episode	
2007	Curtin	Eddie Ward	TV movie	
2007; 2010	City Homicide	Mike Davies / Ray Donovan	2 episodes	
2007–2011	Neighbours	Various	10 episodes	
2009	The Saddle Club	Ethan Goodbar	2 episodes	
2009	Dirt Game	Leo Ives	Miniseries, 2 episodes	
2009	Whatever Happened to That Guy?	Lance Purves	3 episodes	
2009	Rush	Robert Hayden	1 episode	
2009–2012	Tangle	Billy Hall	13 episodes	
2010	Sleuth 101	Keenan	1 episode	
2010	Bed of Roses	Legal	1 episode	
2011	Killing Time	Justice Peterson	1 episode	
2012	The Mystery of a Hansom Cab	John Knox	TV movie	
2013	Miss Fisher's Murder Mysteries	Sgt Baxter	1 episode	
2013	Winners & Losers	Father Brennan	2 episodes	
2014	Wentworth	Graham Dalby	2 episodes	
2015	Childhood's End	Jim	Miniseries, 1 episode	
2017	The Ex-PM	Crazy Joe	3 episodes	
2018	Olivia Newton-John: Hopelessly Devoted to You	Dr Levinson	Miniseries, 1 episode	
2018	Jack Irish	Razor Ray	5 episodes	
2018	The Inbestigators	Mr Henderson	1 episode	
2021	Superwog	Lawyer	1 episode	
2021	The Newsreader	Dr Shaw	2 episodes	
2021	Fires	Rollo	1 episode	
2022	Summer Love	Neighbour	1 episode	
2023	Safe Home	Magistrate Johns	1 episode	
2023	Five Bedrooms	Cliff	1 episode	
2024	Fake	Mr Whitney	1 episode	

== Theatre ==
=== As performer ===
Year	Title	Role	Notes	Ref.
1978	The Kookaburra Longjohn Underwear Show			
1978–1979	The Mouth Show	Dentist	VIC/QLD tour with Handspan Theatre	
1979	Zastrozzi	Verezzi	Pram Factory, Melbourne with Australian Performing Group	
1980	Catch a Rising Star	MC	Melbourne Theatre Restaurant	
1980	The Mouth Show	Dentist	VIC tour with Handspan Theatre	
1980–1982	The Bunyip of Berkeley's Creek	Bunyip 1	Australian tour, Paris, Georgetown University, Washington DC, Amsterdam, St Martin-in-the Fields, London, Heriott Watt Theatre, Edinburgh	
1982	Christmas is Beyond a Joke		Le Joke, Melbourne	
1985	Tony Rickards Takes a Punt		and The Last Laugh	
1987	More Trouble	Solo show	Universal Theatre, Melbourne	
1994	Amadeus	Rosenberg	Melbourne Athenaeum with Griffin Entertainment Ltd	
2012	Every Night, Every Night	Barrett	Frank Theatre Company	
2014	Cock	F (M’s father)	Arts Centre Melbourne, Roundhouse Theatre, Brisbane with MTC	
2015	West Side Story	Doc	State Theatre, Melbourne with The Production Company	
2016	Curtains	Oscar Shapiro	State Theatre, Melbourne with The Production Company	

=== As writer/director ===
Year	Title	Role	Notes	Ref.
1980–1982	The Bunyip of Berkeley's Creek	Scriptwriter	Australian tour, Paris, Georgetown University, Washington DC, Amsterdam, St Martin-in-the Fields, London, Heriott Watt Theatre, Edinburgh	
1981	Con and Vince Expo '81	Playwright	Coral Capers Theatre Restaurant, Caloundra	
1981	Dr Cloth and the Teresa O'Reilly Explosion	Director	Melbourne Comedy Cafe	
1984	Sidney Spider's Muesli Bowl	Writer	Sidney Myer Music Bowl, Melbourne with Handspan Theatre	
1988	Waves of Change	Playwright	Castlemaine Swimming Pool with Handspan Theatre	

== Awards ==
Year	Work	Award	Category	Result	Ref.
1998	Operation Dostoyevsky	Melbourne University Festival of Short Films	Best Supporting Actor	Won	
