= Tasmania Award for Enduring Architecture =

Annual award for culturally significant buildings in Tasmania, Australia

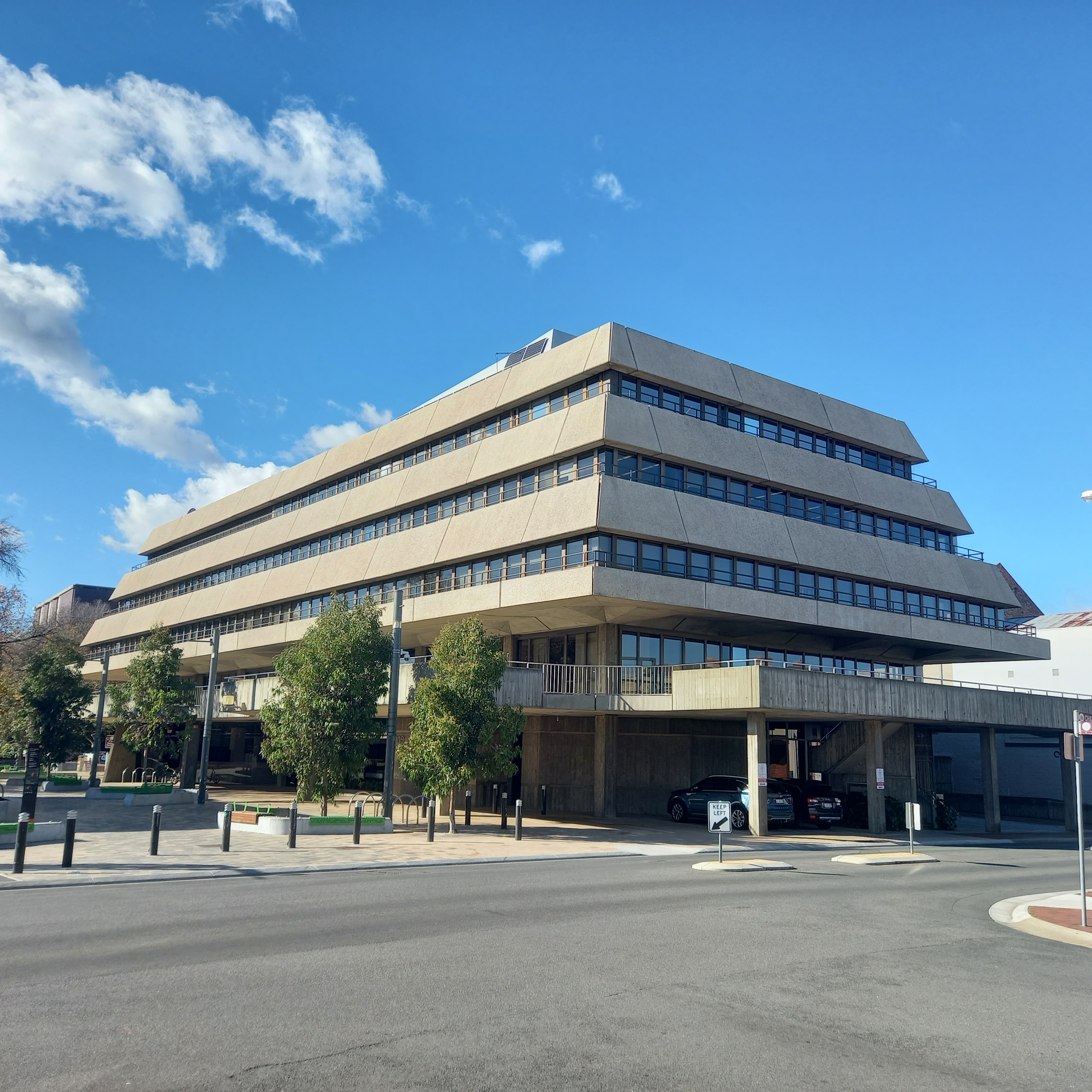
- 2025 Award: Henty House, Launceston
- Awarded for: Outstanding Tasmanian architecture over time (25 years or more)
- Country: Australia
- Presented by: Australian Institute of Architects (Tasmania Chapter)
- First award: 2010; 16 years ago
- Currently held by: Peter Partridge for Henty House, 2025

The Tasmania Award for Enduring Architecture is an architecture prize presented annually by the Tasmania Chapter of the Australian Institute of Architects (AIA) since the inaugural award was presented in 2010. The award recognises significant, long lasting and innovative architecture with usually more than 25 years passed since the completion of construction.

== Background ==
The Award for Enduring Architecture recognises achievement for the design of buildings of outstanding merit, which have remained important as high quality works of architecture when considered in contemporary cultural, social, economic and environmental contexts in the state of Tasmania. Nominations for the award can be made by AIA members, non–members and non–architects, but they must provide adequate material and information supporting the nomination for consideration of the jury. The award was initially known as the 25 Year Award, but was renamed in line with the national and other state based awards in 2013.

The average age of the 17 projects recognised from 2010 to 2026 is 43.4 years from completion of construction to year of award.

== National award winners ==
Recipients of the state–based award are eligible for consideration of the National Award for Enduring Architecture presented later in the same year, as part of the Australian National Architecture Awards.

Only one project located in Tasmania has won the national award. In 2010 the Supreme Court Complex in Salamanca Place, Hobart by the Department of Public Works (Architect Peter Partridge) won both the state and national award 35 years after the building was completed in 1975.

== List of award recipients ==
Tasmania Enduring Architecture Awards (reverse order)
| Year | Architect | Project | Location | Year built | Years since | Other AIA Awards |
|---|---|---|---|---|---|---|
| 2026 | Esmond Dorney | Dorney House at Fort Nelson | 22 Gardenia Grove, Sandy Bay, Hobart | 1978 | 48 years | |
| 2025 | Department of Housing and Construction (Peter Partridge) | Henty House | 1 Civic Square, Launceston | 1983 | 42 years | |
| 2024 | Hartley Wilson and Bolt Architects | Long Beach Bathing Pavilion | 646A Sandy Bay Road, Sandy Bay, Hobart | 1962 | 62 years | |
| 2023 | Morris–Nunn Associates and Forward Viney Woollan | Strahan Visitor Centre | Esplanade, Strahan | 1997 | 26 years | National Awards Finalist, 1998; Recycling Award, 1998 (Tas); Colorbond Award for Steel Architecture, 1998 (Tas) |
| 2022 | Bush Parkes Shugg & Moon | Clarence Council Chambers | 38 Bligh Street, Rosny Park, Hobart | 1974 | 48 years | RAIA Triennial Award, 1976 (Tas) |
| 2021 | Hartley Wilson Oldmeadow Eastman Walch Architects (Brian Walch) | Wilson Robson Building | 191—193 Liverpool Street, Hobart | 1973 | 48 years | |
| 2020 | Heffernan Nation Rees Viney Architects (Robert Nation & Bevan Rees) | Hobart Animal Hospital | 198 Murray Street, Hobart | 1977 | 43 years | |
| 2019 | Jim Moon | Bornholm residence | 14a Red Chapel Avenue, Sandy Bay, Hobart | 1961? | 49 years | Design Award Category 3 (Residential), 1966 (Tas) |
| 2018 | Latona Masterman and Associates (Ken Latona) | Friendly Beaches Lodge | Friendly Beaches, Coles Bay | 1992 | 26 years | National Commercial Architecture Award, 1993 |
| 2017 | Esmond Dorney | St Pius X Church | 98 Channel Highway, Taroona, Hobart | 1957 | 60 years | |
| 2016 | Tasmanian Government, Department of Public Works (John Gott and Ben Ryan) | Resource Materials Centre, Hobart College | 950 Olinda Grove, Mount Nelson, Hobart | 1972 | 44 years | |
| 2015 | No Award | | | | | |
| 2014 | Forward Consultants and Alex Kostromin & Associates (Garry Forward) | University of Tasmania Centre for the Arts | Hunter Street, Hobart | 1987 | 27 years | Award for Recycled Buildings, 1987 (Tas); RAIA National President's Award, 1987 |
| 2013 | Hartley Wilson & Bolt Architects | Scottish Union Building | 152 Macquarie Street, Hobart | 1962 | 51 years | |
| 2012 | Commonwealth Department of Works | Reserve Bank Building | 111 Macquarie Street, Hobart | 1977 | 45 years | |
| 2011 | Hartley Wilson & Bolt Architects (Dirk Bolt) | Christ College (University of Tasmania) | 20 College Road, Sandy Bay, Hobart | 1971 | 40 years | |
| 2010 | Department of Public Works (Peter Partridge) | Supreme Court Complex | Salamanca Place, Hobart | 1975 | 35 years | National Award for Enduring Architecture, 2010 |

== See also ==
- Australian Institute of Architects
- Australian Institute of Architects Awards and Prizes
- National Award for Enduring Architecture
- Jack Cheesman Award for Enduring Architecture
- Maggie Edmond Enduring Architecture Award
- New South Wales Enduring Architecture Award
- Robin Gibson Award for Enduring Architecture
- Sir Roy Grounds Award for Enduring Architecture
