= Ben Bowyang =

Australian comic

Ben Bowyang was an Australian newspaper comic strip, first published in the Melbourne Herald on Saturday, 7 October 1933, created by the cartoonist Alex Gurney, that followed the misadventures of two archetypical Australian bushmen, Ben Bowyang and his mate, Bill Smith, of "Gunn's Gully": characters that first appeared in the humorous Herald columns written during the 1920s and 1930s by C. J. Dennis.

== Ben Bowyang ==
Ben Bowyang, a philosophical farmer from "Gunn's Gully" first appeared — as the author of "A Letter from the Bush" — in C.J. Dennis's regular Herald column, The Mooch of Life on 12 June 1922.

The Bowyang.

When I was a boy the bowyang was worn by
most bush-workers, and by labourers generally.
It is never seen today. The bowyang — in case
you do not know — is a strap worn just below
the knee of the trousers. Its purpose was to take
the drag from [the] braces or waist-belt, and to
lift the trouser-ends well clear of the ground. And
very comfortably it performed this service, too. …
Bernard Cronin (1952).

The characters, Ben Bowyang and Bill Smith, featured in so many of the comical letters published in Dennis' columns, and became such favourites among the Herald's readers that, a year later, the Herald's resident caricaturist Samuel Garnet Wells pretended to have visited Gunn's Gully — "Correspondents have frequently asked what Ben Bowyang and Bill Smith are like. This is Wells's impression of them after a visit to Gunns Gully" — and presented 'caricatures' of the fictional pair, as if they were, indeed, real people.

Ten years later, based upon Dennis' columns and Well's (1923) caricatures, Gurney (at the time also a Herald employee) went on to create the characters for his successful comic strip.

== Gurney's comic strip ==
Prompted by the fact that the last-ever letter written by Ben Bowyang, appeared in the Herald on Saturday, 30 September 1933, and the need for a seamless transition, Gurney's first daily strip was published in The Herald a week later, on Saturday, 7 October 1933.

On Thursday, 23 November 1933, the Adelaide weekly, The Chronicle, published the first of its regular single page presentations of five Gurney strips, each of which had, independently, appeared earlier in the Melbourne Herald.

=== Later artists ===
The strip was also drawn by Mick Armstrong, Keith Martin, Sir Lionel Lindsay, Alex McRae, and Peter Russell-Clarke. It ceased publication in 1979.

== See also ==
- Bowyangs
