= Mud, Bloody Mud =

- Directed by: Lindesay Dresdon
- Written by: Cliff Green
- Based on: comic strip Bluey and Curley by Alex Gurney
- Produced by: Oscar Whitbread
- Starring: Simon Thorope; Tony Rickards
- Production company: ABC
- Release date: 1985
- Country: Australia
- Language: English

Mud, Bloody Mud is a 1985 Australian television film based on a popular comic strip, Bluey and Curley. These comic book characters link documentary footage with puppets playing political figures. The show mixed together actors as soldiers with actors in oversized caricature heads playing the likes of Robert Menzies, John Curtin, General MacArthur and General Blamey. It aired on ABC in October 1986.

The script was written by Cliff Green for the ABC. Green:

We had a very tight budget, very few actors, and no outside filming - so the whole thing was shot in-studio. The only real people in it - there is a narrator who is an army Medical Officer - he is the battalion M.O.; and there are two soldiers who are actually Bluey and Curly, the cartoon characters. And everybody else is puppets. So the politicians are puppets. And they are full-size - they are actually people but they are like those Sesame Street puppets... It was about the way the Australians were just sidelined by MacArthur, and left to rot in the jungles. And the dialogue was mostly Bluey and Curly jokes. And we got permission to use them from Sun News Pictorial and also from the cartoonist’s widow. And it had a tragic element because it is a story of a war, so to me it had to have a tragic ending. I would never try to do it again - it was a one-off in terms of its concept. I think nowadays, with animation and all that stuff, and computerisation, it wouldn’t be seen to be so unique. And it won an Award. They repeated it; they got a terrific response. They ran it on Anzac Day evening I think - and they got a fantastic response from RSL clubs and Old Diggers. And they ran it again on Armistice, the eleventh of the eleventh. So it was a real sort of “out of the box” piece of work - but great fun.
