= Alexander Gurney =

Australian artist (1902–1955)

Alex Gurney
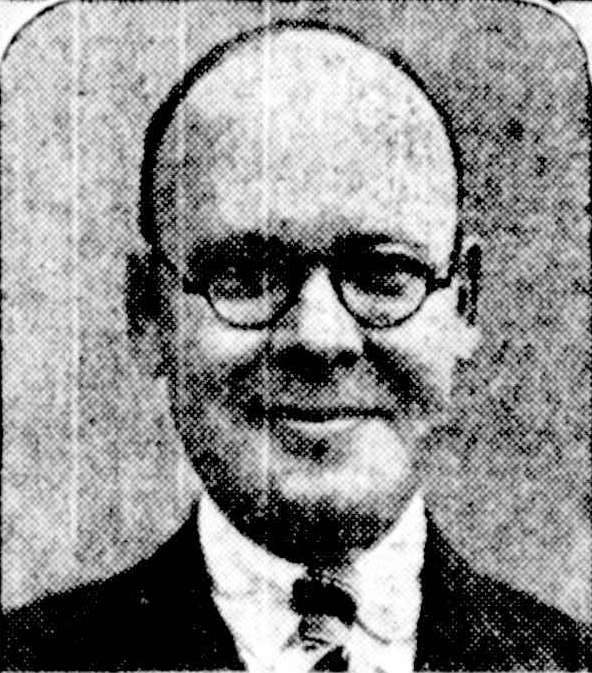
- Alex Gurney in 1939
- Born: 15 March 1902 Stoke, Devonport, United Kingdom
- Died: 4 December 1955 (aged 53) Elwood, Victoria
- Areas: Caricatures, Cartoons, Comic Strips
- Notable works: Ben Bowyang, Bluey and Curley
- Spouse: Junee Grover (m. 16 June 1928)

Alexander George Gurney (15 March 1902 – 4 December 1955) was an English artist, caricaturist, and cartoonist born at Pasley House, Stoke, Devonport (now Stoke, Plymouth), England, famous for his creation of two famous Australian comic strips: Ben Bowyang, and Bluey and Curley. He was inducted into the Australian Cartoonists Association Hall of Fame in 2014.

== Family ==
The son of William George Gurney (1866–1903), and Alice Birdie Gurney (1872–), née Worbey, who had married in Portsmouth on 29 May 1901, Alexander George Gurney was born on 15 March 1902 at Pasley House, Stoke, Devonport (now Stoke, Plymouth), England.

His father and his mother (born in Hobart), along with Alex settled in Hobart, Tasmania. Soon after, the ship upon which his father, a steward in the merchant navy, was serving, went missing at sea (off the Canary Islands); and his father was presumed dead. On 2 July 1908 his mother (always known as Birdie, rather than Alice) married again, to James William Albert Hursey (1866–1946).

Gurney married Junee Grover (1909–1984) on 16 June 1928 at Christ Church, South Yarra. Junee was the daughter of the journalist Montague "Monty" MacGregor Grover (1870–1943), and Ada Grover (1877–1928), née Goldberg. Alex and Junee Gurney had four children: John (1929–2004), Jennifer Anne (1932–2004), Susan (1937–2003), and Margaret (1943–), the eminent Melbourne artist.

== Education ==
Gurney was educated at Macquarie Street State School, where his prowess with a pencil soon became evident, regaling his classmates with caricatures of their faces perched atop incongruous bodies.

Leaving school at age 13, he found employment at an ironmonger's shop, followed by a couple of other jobs, before embarking on an electrical apprenticeship with the Tasmanian Hydro-Electric Commission, in the expectation of becoming an electrical engineer. This entailed taking night classes at Hobart Technical College, but it was not long before his attention was drawn to art classes conducted at the same institution by Lucien Dechaineux (1869–1957).

== Artist ==
Added to his skills as an artist, his capacity for the observation of his fellow humans made him a successful portraitist and caricaturist; by 1918 he was submitting work to The Bulletin, Melbourne Punch and Smith's Weekly. In 1923, he was awarded first prize at the Kingborough Agricultural Show for "an original pencil drawing".

Historic Drawing Board (1934)

Australian cartoonist, Alex. Gurney, whose work
has gained international reputation possesses
what is probably the most travelled, and historic
drawing board in the Commonwealth. Originally,
it was a panel of a cedar door in the now
demolished "Old Bell Hotel", Elizabeth Street,
Hobart. The door which marked the entrance to
a room in which Marcus Clarke is supposed to
have written "For the Term of his Natural Life"
was bought at an auction sale, the panel-
drawing-board being later presented to the
then burgeoning artist. Mr. Gurney has been in
many parts of Australia and the thousands of
drawing-pin holes tell a story of their own…

In 1926 he published a book of his caricatures of eminent Tasmanians, Tasmanians Today, the first book of its kind ever published in Tasmania. Also in 1926, he began working for newspapers, briefly in Melbourne for the Morning Post, then freelanced in Sydney until he landed a job with the Sunday Times, then for a Labor paper The World, followed by the Daily Guardian, The Sydney Mail, then to Adelaide with The News in 1931. Throughout his lifetime he was renowned for his generous habit of giving the originals of his caricatures, cartoons, and comic strips to anyone who asked.

== Cartoons and comic strips ==
During this time he created several comic series; Stiffy and Mo (based on the radio comedy starring Nat Phillips and Roy Rene) for Beckett's Budget; and The Daggs for the Sunday Times.

In 1932, he created "Fred, the Football Fan" for the Adelaide Mail.

When he moved to the Melbourne Herald in 1933 (as cartoonist for their Sports pages), he started a series Ben Bowyang (based on the C J Dennis creation, and the earlier caricature by Samuel Garnet Wells) for that paper. In 1934 he became their feature cartoonist.

By 1939, his fame was such that, not only was he endorsing Red Capstan, cork-tipped, "special mild" cigarettes, he was also supplying the advertisement's art-work as well.

== Bluey and Curley ==
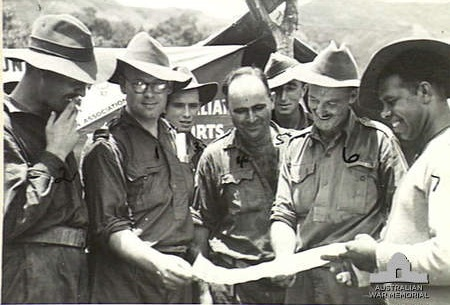
Alex Gurney (second from left) presenting the original art work of a Bluey and Curley comic strip to soldiers of the 2/12th Battalion in New Guinea, 5 March 1944.

In 1939 he created the characters for which he became famous: Bluey and Curley. He applied for the copyright registration of "Bluey and Curley" on 16 October 1939; and his application was granted on 9 November 1939 (Australian Copyright No.6921). The strip, about a pair of soldiers, Bluey, the Great War veteran who had re-enlisted, and Curley, the new recruit to the A.I.F.

Bluey and Curley first appeared in the "Picture-News" magazine. It was transferred to The Sun News-Pictorial in 1940, from whence it was syndicated throughout Australia, New Zealand and Canada.

The strip was widely appreciated for the good-humoured way it depicted the Australian "diggers" and their "mateship", as well as for its realistic use of Australian idiom of the day. During the war, he was accredited as a war correspondent, and he visited army camps throughout Australia and New Guinea to ensure authenticity for his strip. While in New Guinea he contracted malaria and was incapacitated for some time.

Gurney was in England in June 1946, as part of an Australian Press Syndicate sent specifically to view the Victory Parade. As well as sending caricatures of various eminent people involved in that parade back to Australia for distribution through the press, he also used the opportunity to have Bluey and Curley attend the parade, and a number of his Bluey and Curley comic strips reflected that event. Gurney's visit to London, and his version of events, as seen through his Bluey and Curley comic strip, was also historically significant for another reason: it was the first time that a newspaper comic strip had ever been transmitted from England to Australia by radio.

The strip lost some of its appeal and readership when the pair returned to "civvy street". After Gurney's sudden death in 1955, the strip was continued by Norman Rice, and then by Les Dixon.

== Associations ==
Gurney was a member of the Returned Sailors' Soldiers' and Airmens Imperial League of Australia (RSS&AILA), now known as The Returned and Services League of Australia (RSL), the Black and White Artists' Club, now known as The Australian Cartoonists' Association, and the Savage Club.

Alex Gurney)

Today's world needs men who can make it smile and some-
times guffaw.
Alex Gurney, creator of the Bluey and Curley comic strip, who
died on Sunday night, was that kind of man.
He was a happy man himself. He liked fishing, a beer or two,
a good story.
Gurney will be remembered for a long time, because he had
an inborn genius for knowing what makes men laugh. He would
have hated to picture them weeping over his tomb.
John Hetherington, The Age, 6 December 1955.

== Death ==
Gurney died suddenly, of heart disease, on 4 December 1955. He had been ill for several months, and had collapsed in his motor car parked outside his residence at 7 Merton Avenue, Elwood.

His funeral service, conducted by Rev. Selwyn Ide, at St Stephen's Church of England, Gardenvale, on Tuesday, 6 December 1955, was attended by "more than 500 journalists, artists and friends".

== His art ==
=== Copyright ===
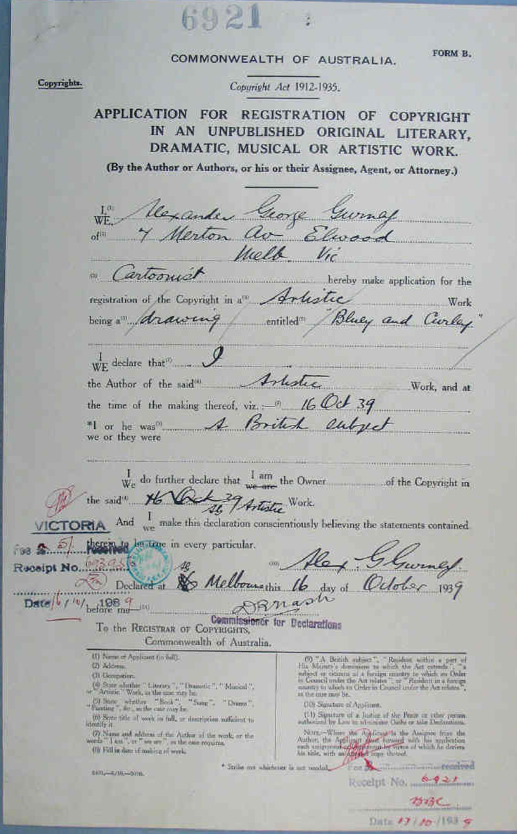
Copyright Application.

== Publications ==
- Tasmanians Today: Caricatures and Cartoons Hobart 1926.
- Stiffy and Mo: Cartoons, Darlington 1928.
- How to Draw for "The Mail", Young People's Supplement, The (Adelaide) Mail, (Saturday, 8 April 1933), p.2.
- Ben Bowyang Herald and Weekly Times 1938.
- Sickness without Sorrow (illustrations to stories by 'GP') Robertson & Mullens, Melbourne 1947.
- Life with Laughter (illustrations to stories by 'GP') Georgian House, Melbourne 1950.

=== Illustrator ===
- Dyer, B., This'll Slay you! by Bob Dyer; illustrations by Gurney, Bob Dyer, (Melbourne), 1943.

== See also ==
- Ben Bowyang
- Bluey and Curley
