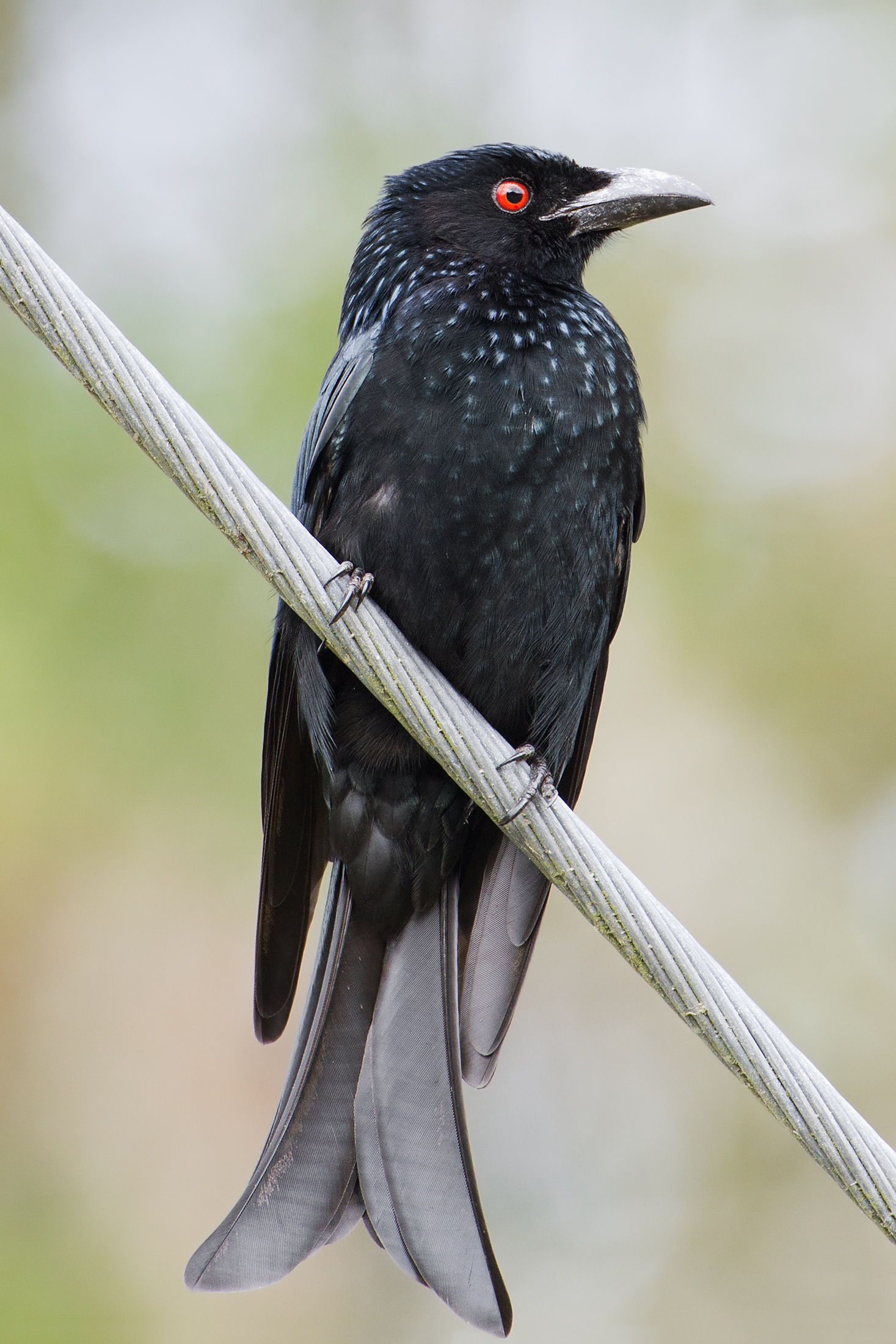

Conservation status
- Least Concern (IUCN 3.1)

Scientific classification
- Kingdom: Animalia
- Phylum: Chordata
- Class: Aves
- Order: Passeriformes
- Family: Dicruridae
- Genus: Dicrurus
- Species: D. bracteatus

Binomial name
- Dicrurus bracteatus Gould, 1843 (Note: Although the meeting of the Zoological Society took place on 11 October 1842 and the volume of the Proceedings of the Zoological Society of London is dated 1842, the issue was not published until 1843.)
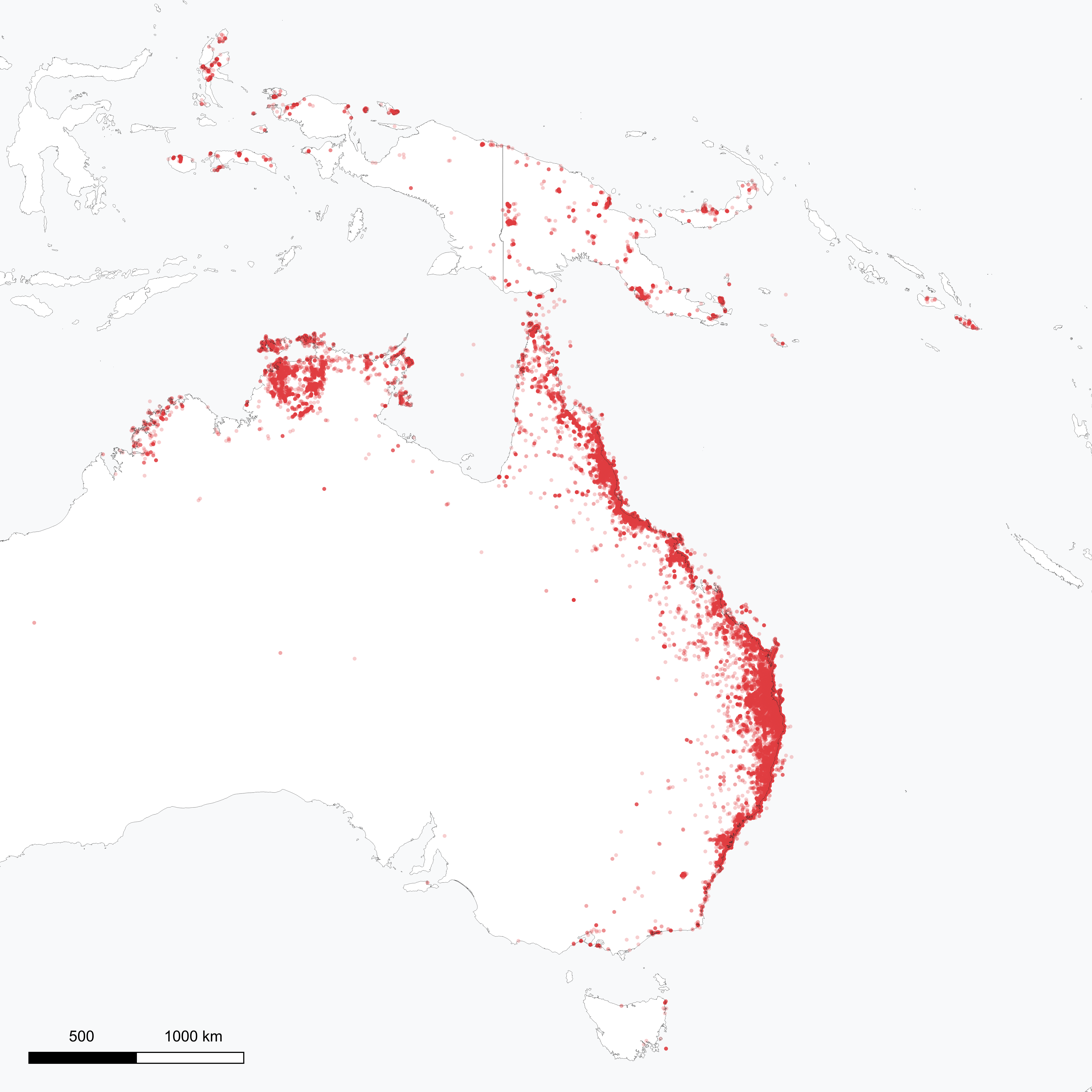
- Species distribution

= Spangled drongo =

Species of bird

The spangled drongo (Dicrurus bracteatus) is a bird of the family Dicruridae. It is the only drongo to be found in Australia, where it can be recognised by its black, iridescent plumage and its characteristic forked tail. It feeds on insects and small vertebrates. It has complex and varied calls and is a mimic of the sounds it hears. It arrives in Queensland in late spring and breeds high in an isolated tree, producing three to five young each year.

== Description ==
Its black plumage is iridescent with blue and purple highlights and its eyes are a striking red. The most remarkable characteristic of its appearance is its tail, which is described by Morcombe as "long, outcurved and forked" and on first examination looks like its feathers are crossed over – like crossing your fingers. Young drongos lack the highlights and spots and their eyes are dark brown.

== Behaviour ==
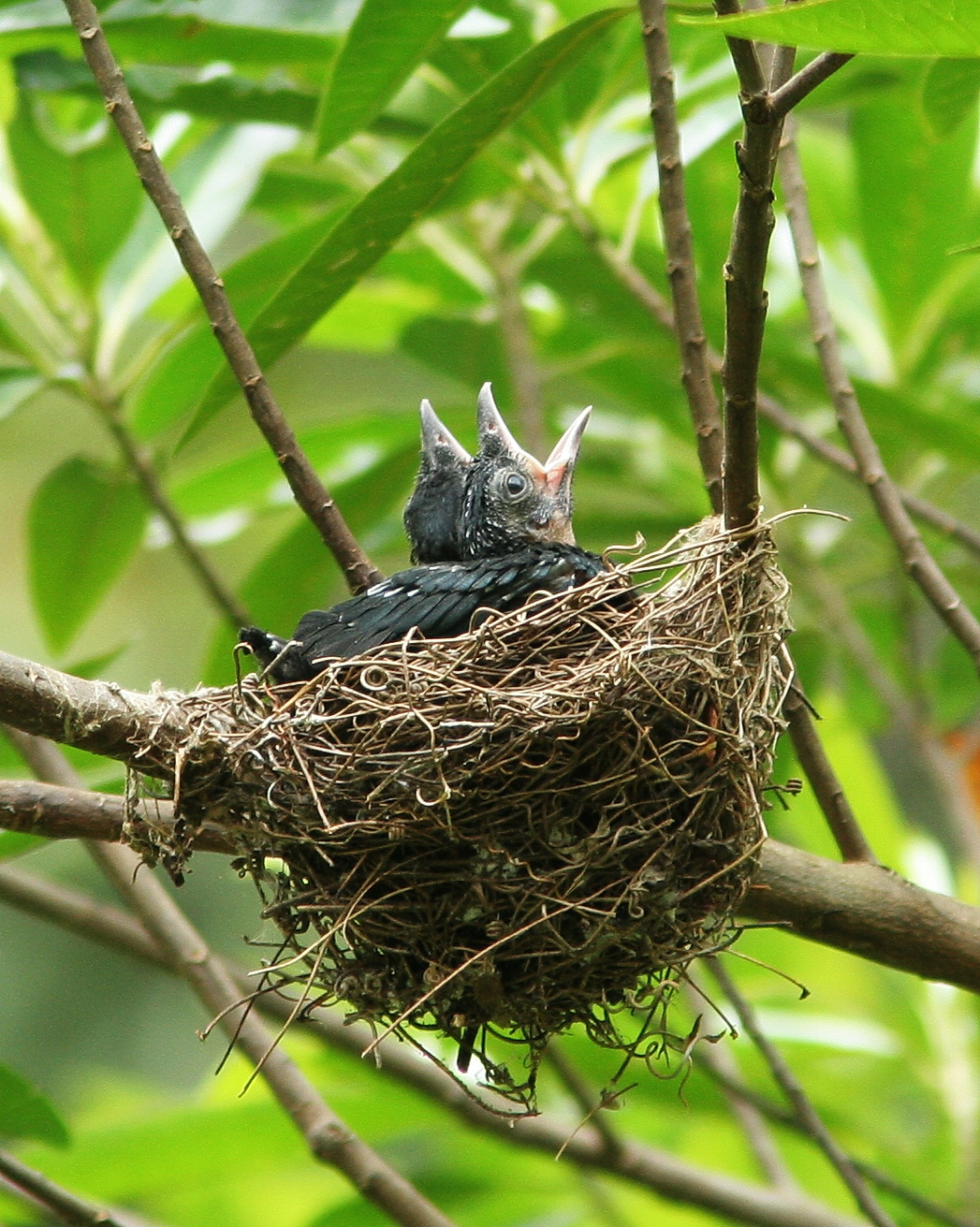
A nest of vine tendrils

The spangled drongo hunts by perching upon branches, or, in urban environments, telephone wires, swooping down once prey such as insects, small birds, and occasionally, small skinks appears. The drongo will catch its prey midair and then return to the perch before eating.

Whilst the bird is commonly silent, it occasionally makes astonishingly loud and complex calls that may sound like a "sneeze". The spangled drongo is a skilled mimic, and may mimic the calls of other birds and things around it.

The spangled drongo is the only drongo to be found in Australia. These birds are altitudinal and latitudinal migrants, and in the high-altitude areas around Brisbane in Queensland, they arrive in late spring and leave with their new crop of juveniles in midsummer.

During breeding season these drongos are particularly aggressive, swooping at and attacking other birds or predators that near their nest. Outside of the nest drongos may attack and chase other birds in order to steal food. They also have little fear of humans.

Spangled drongos produce only one clutch of three to five eggs per season, which are cared for by both parents. Males and females collaborate to build cup-shaped nests of vine-tendrils, grass, and twigs linked together with spider web. They suspend the nest in the horizontal forks of the outer branches of a tree.

== Trivia ==
The unsuccessful racehorse Drongo was named after the bird, which led to the Australian slang insult "drongo" meaning "idiot".
