= Norm Rice (cartoonist) =

Australian cartoonist

Norman Rice
- Born: Norman Howard Rice; 15 January 1911; Newtown, Sydney, Australia
- Died: 31 December 1956 (aged 45); Balgowlah, Sydney, Australia
- Occupations: Cartoonist, comic book/strip artist
- Writing career
- Pen name: Norm Rice, Tom Rice
- Period: c.1930–1956

Norman Howard Rice (15 January 1911 – 31 December 1956) was an Australian cartoonist, comic book artist and illustrator.

== Biography ==
Norman Howard Rice was born in 1911 in Newtown, New South Wales. Upon leaving school he became an apprentice with a Sydney sign writing firm. Rice also studied art at Jack Watkin's Sydney Art School.

Rice worked freelance, selling cartoons to The Bulletin, Smith's Weekly, Rydges Business Journal and other Sydney publications. Rice also drew comic strips, including Powerman, Steele Carewe, Dr Darbill and Nick Carver of the Circus for Frank Johnson Publications.

At the beginning of the Second World War Rice joined an army camouflage unit; he later transferred to a survey unit and served in New Guinea. During this time he produced a comic book of wartime cartoons called Rice and Shine.

Following the war, in 1946, Rice joined the staff of Smith's Weekly as a cartoonist. When the paper ceased publication in October 1950 Rice returned to freelancing and also prepared promotional material for Universal Films.

In 1956 following the death of Alexander George Gurney he took over the comic strip, Bluey and Curley, but drew the strip for less than a year, as he died in a car accident on New Year's Eve 1956.
