= Elwood, Victoria =

Elwood
- Suburb
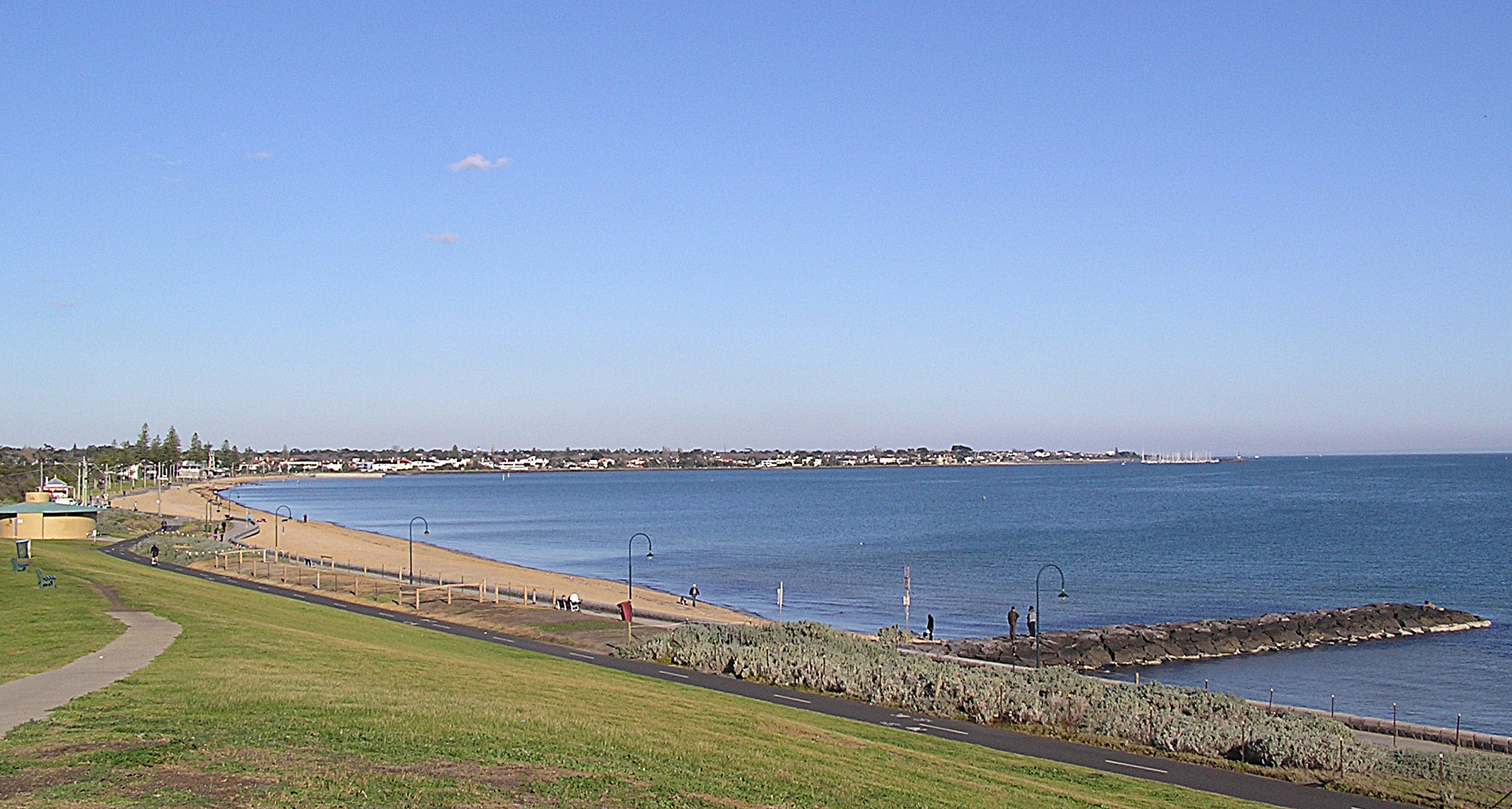
- Elwood Beach

- Interactive map of Elwood
- Coordinates: 37.884°S 144.986°E
- Country: Australia
- State: Victoria
- City: Melbourne
- LGA: City of Port Phillip
- Location: 8 km (5.0 mi) from Melbourne
- Established: 1900s

Government
  - State electorate: Brighton
  - Federal division: Macnamara

Area
  - Total: 2.6 km^{2} (1.0 sq mi)
- Elevation: 11 m (36 ft)

Population
  - Total: 15,153 (2021 census)
  - Density: 5,830/km^{2} (15,090/sq mi)
- Postcode: 3184
Suburbs around Elwood
Port Phillip	St Kilda	St Kilda East
Port Phillip	Elwood	Balaclava, Ripponlea, Elsternwick
Brighton	Brighton	Brighton

Elwood is an inner suburb in Melbourne, Victoria, Australia, 8 km south-east of Melbourne's Central Business District, located within the City of Port Phillip local government area. Elwood recorded a population of 15,153 at the 2021 census.

Elwood Beach is a popular bayside beach destination during summer, where the beaches are used recreationally for windsurfing, cycling, cricket and walking.

The suburb is known for its mix of Edwardian and Interwar architecture character, its beaches and its leafy streets, many of which are lined by London plane trees.

== History ==
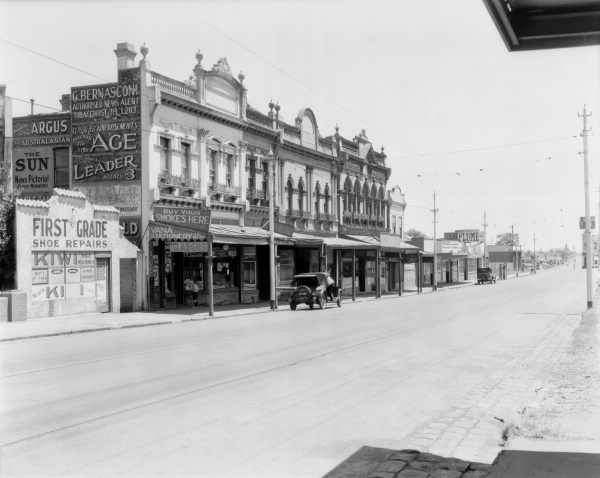
Glenhuntly Road Elsternwick in 1938

The earliest inhabitants and traditional owners of the area now covered by the City of Port Phillip were the Yalukit Wilum, one of the five clans of the Boon Wurrung, known as the coastal tribe, and who were members of the Kulin nation. They inhabited the swampy areas below Emerald Hill and the sandy-ridged ti-tree covered coastline, which extended from St Kilda to Fishermans Bend (Port Melbourne). The Aboriginal inhabitants knew the St Kilda area as Euro-Yroke a name they used to describe the red-brown sandstone found along the beach. Yalukit Willam: The river people of Port Phillip, provides an Aboriginal history of the area.

On 17 April 1840, the ship Glen Huntly carrying 157 settlers, arrived in Port Phillip flying the yellow fever flag, indicating disease on board. At least 50 of its passengers were sick with typhus fever. A quarantine station, comprising two tent camps, was quickly set up at Point Ormond (then known as Little Red Bluff) for the arrivals, one camp for the sick ones and one for the others. The arrivals were release from quarantine in June. At least three arrivals died at the camp and were buried on the bluff. They were moved to St Kilda Cemetery in 1898.

Point Ormond had for centuries been the home of the Yalukit Willam clan. "The nearby Elwood swamp provided vegetables, wildfowl and eels. The reef which extends from the base of the Point into the sea provided shellfish, fish and crustaceans. Point Ormond was a very important source of seafood as Aboriginal women were visiting there three times per week in the autumn of 1840 to collect shellfish". The quarantine station was set up right alongside these wetlands. However, Aboriginal people, not aware of the establishment of the dangerous camp, made a routine visit to these wetlands to harvest shellfish. This visit was cited by then Superintendent of the Port Phillip District Charles La Trobe as a reason to expel all Aboriginal camps from Melbourne on 19 April 1840.

Originally, Elwood was swampland, with Elster Creek draining into the swamp near the beach. For most of the 19th century the wetland was viewed as a barrier to European development. Elwood Canal was constructed to connect the lower reaches of Elster Creek with Port Phillip Bay, three hundred metres north of Point Ormond. European settlement used waterways like Elster Creek for waste disposal. In 1869, because of the foul conditions of the Elwood swamp, local residents called on the St Kilda Council to remove the nearby abattoir and night soil depot.

Installation of the Elwood Canal turned Elwood into an area suitable for residential development. Elwood was initially planned around the two central geographic features of Elster Creek (now Elwood Canal) and the promontory at Point Ormond, then known as Little Red Bluff. Originally a working middle class suburb in the early part of the 20th century, Elwood has seen waves of gentrification and is now one of Melbourne's most sought after bayside suburb. Large period houses, many from the 1920s and 30s with art deco touches, along with proximity to beach and foreshore, have made the area very attractive.

In the late 1970s, like nearby St Kilda, Elwood was known for its nightlife and developed a reputation as a cabaret area. Many of these venues operated out of some of the suburb's quirkier old buildings. As the scene saw a demise in the early 1980s, many buildings, including Maison de Luxe and Moulin Rouge (which operated out of the 1880s mansion "Pladda" built for Captain A. Currie), were subsequently demolished.

Historically, the coastal suburb of Elwood faced significant environmental challenges, including major floods, fires and outbreaks of waterborne diseases during its early settlement period.

In the modern era, the suburb has undergone extensive development and urban renewal. The central commercial district, known as Elwood Village, is characterized by a café culture. Local environmental initiatives have introduced native forest plantings along the foreshore and established green corridors of mature trees, which support populations of native fauna, such as lorikeets. Additionally, the Elwood Canal, formerly a site of industrial and environmental concern, has been redeveloped to serve as a recreational pathway for pedestrians and cyclists.

== Population ==
In the 2016 Census, there were 15,543 people in Elwood. 65.0% of people were born in Australia. The next most common countries of birth were England 4.9%, New Zealand 2.8%, Ireland 1.1%, United States of America 1.1% and India 1.1%. 76.6% of people spoke only English at home. Other languages spoken at home included Greek 1.5%, Italian 1.4%, Russian 1.1%, Spanish 1.1% and French 1.1%. The most common responses for religion were No Religion 48.4% and Catholic 17.0%.

== Local landmarks ==
Elwood Village consist mainly of the group of shops starting on New Street, through Ormond road to Glen Huntly Road. With many iconic restaurants and cafes, famous beauty shops and pet groomers/shop, and traditional boutique barbershops.

=== Parks and open space ===
For such an established leafy suburb, Elwood is built up and lacking in open space. The most popular and largest reserves are bayside, including Elwood Beach, Elwood Canal, and Point Ormond Reserve. The beach and canal are known to suffer from litter pollution and the canal has a distinctive smell resulting from the backflow of seaweed. However, the local council has strategies in place to manage these issues.

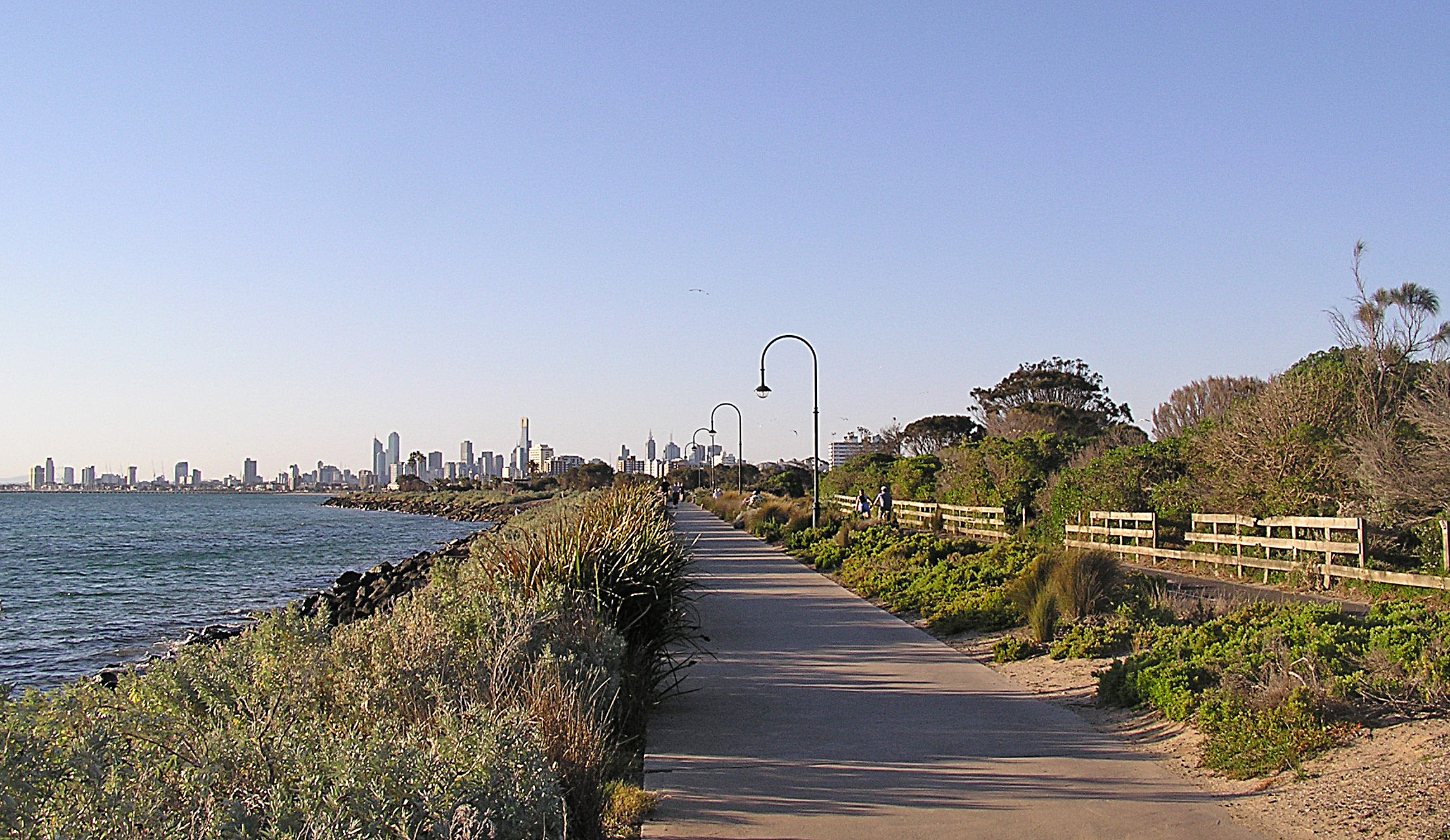
Elwood Beach & Melbourne skyline

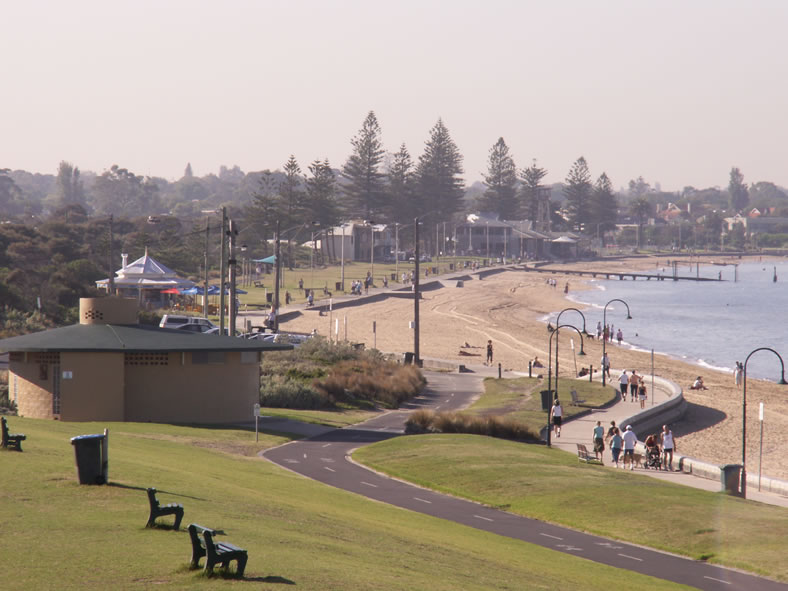
Elwood Beach

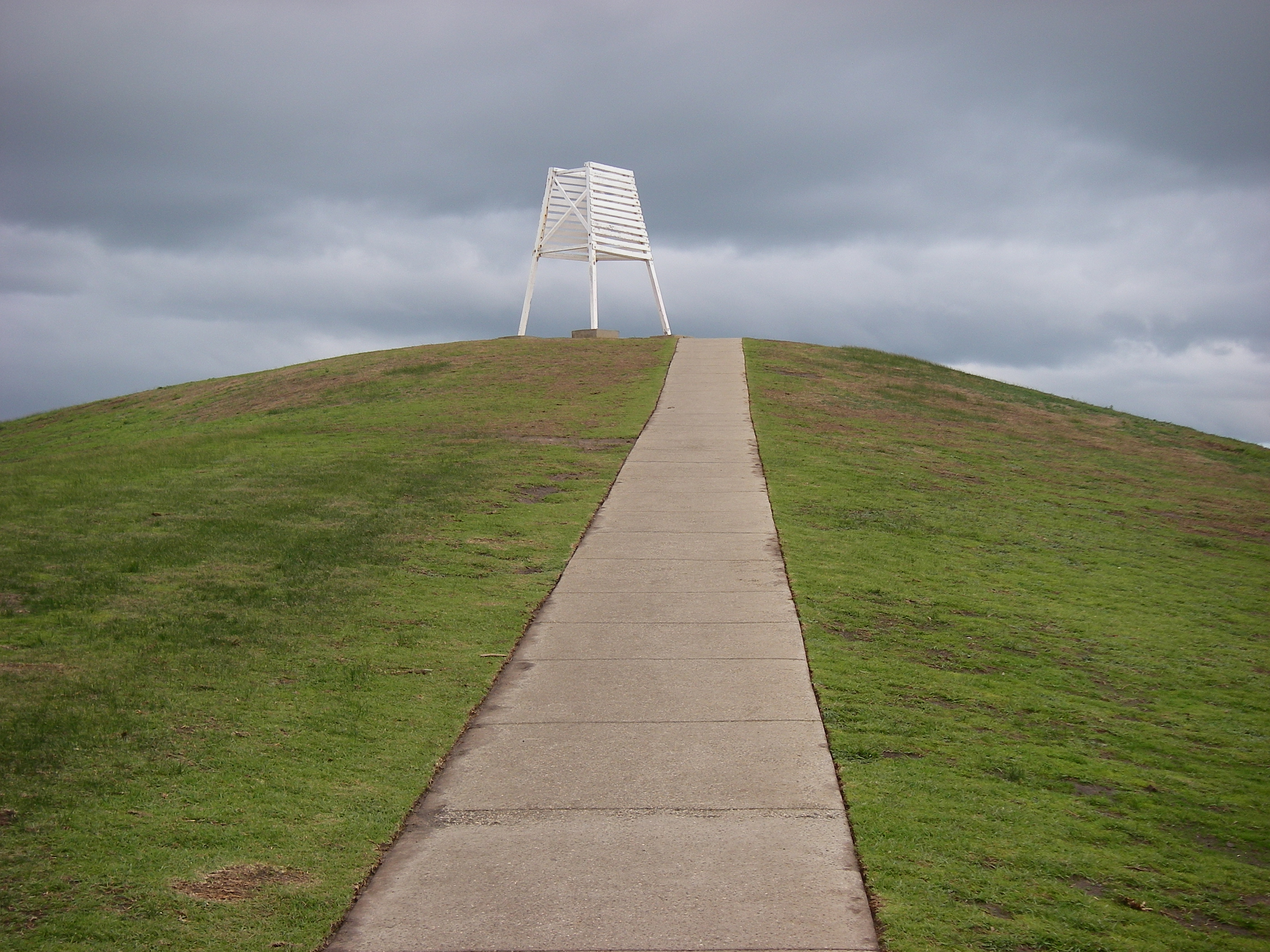
Point Ormond

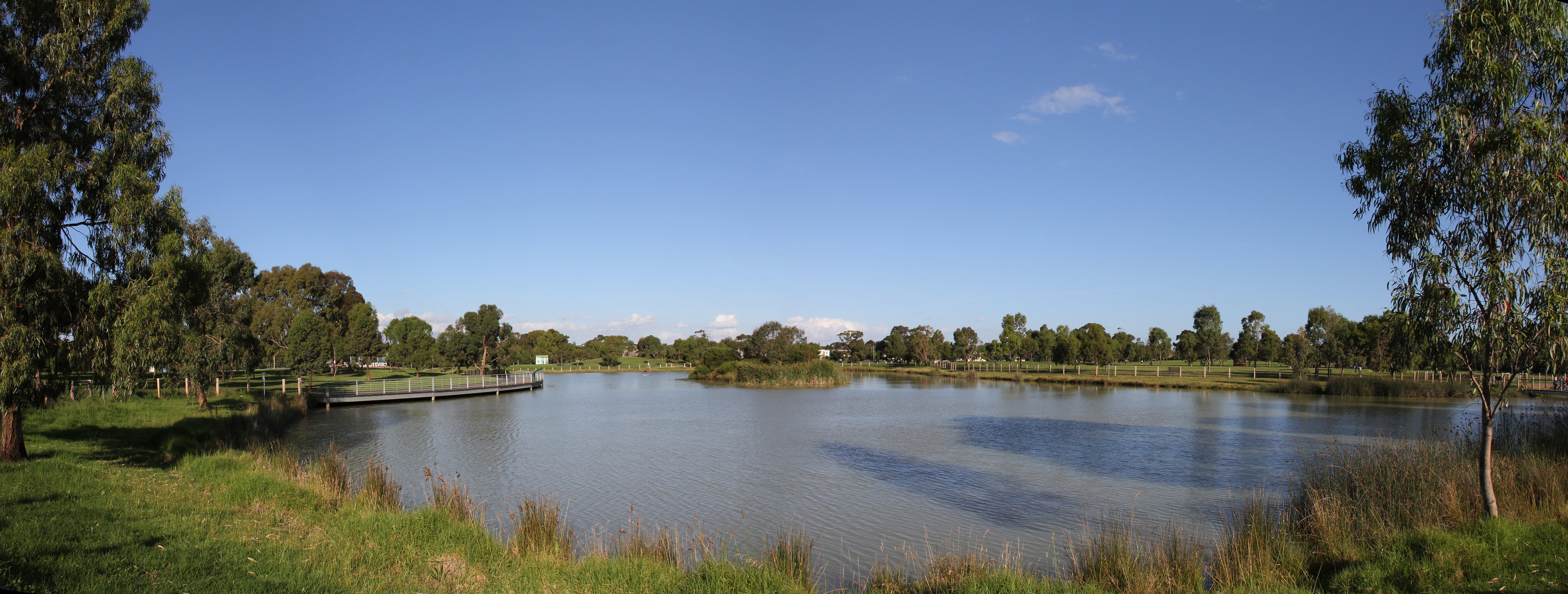
Elsternwick Park

=== Residential architecture ===
Elwood is known for its mix of Victorian mansions, Edwardian cottages and interwar apartment buildings. Infill development in recent decades has changed the character of the suburb, however, some examples still remain.

- Sherwood Hall, formerly named "Rotherfield", is a large Victorian (45 room) mansion at 14 Hennessy Avenue. It was built between 1890 and 1891 by David C. Askew of Twentyman & Askew (architects), for Joseph Cowen Syme, who was a co-owner of "The Age" newspaper, for some 12 years. Upon the death of Laura Syme (J.C. Symes' widow) in the 1920s, the mansion was turned into flats. Sherwood Hall is listed in the Port Phillip Heritage Review, 1998.
- Woy Woy is the earliest of a small group of multi-storied modernist flats in Elwood, it is also the earliest of its kind in Melbourne. Built in 1925–1936 the flats were designed by Mewton & Grounds. Woy Woy is located at 77 Marine Parade, Elwood, Victoria, Australia. The design of the apartment block is extremely minimal. The interlocking cubic forms in the design reveal an interest in architect Willem Dudok.
- Architect and resident Esmond Dorney, who is best known for his post war Modernist residential work in Tasmania, designed several flats in Elwood in the 1930s including St Kiernan's Flats (51 Ormond Esplanade), Antigone Flats (34 Docker Street) and Winderemere (49 Broadway).
- La Tourelle flats, 47A Brighton Road, corner of Dickens Street, is one of the many large blocks of interwar flats in the area, around Brighton Road.
- Belmac flats on the corner of Goldsmith Street and Mitford Street 'Belmac', designed by James Wardrop, built in 1943
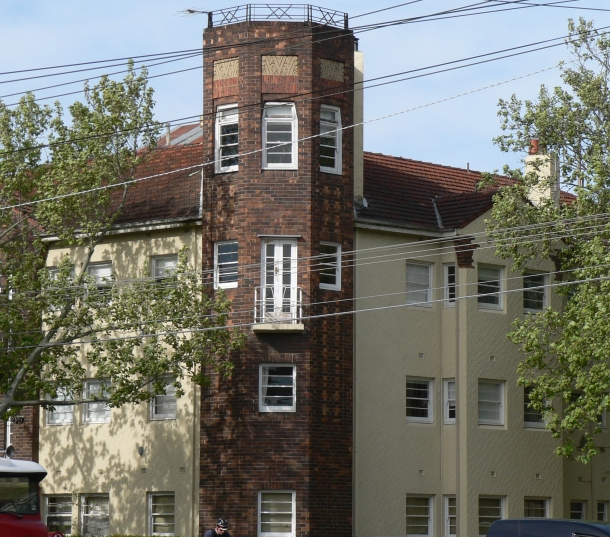
La Tourelle flats, 47A Brighton Road, corner of Dickens Street. Designed by architect and resident Esmond Dorney

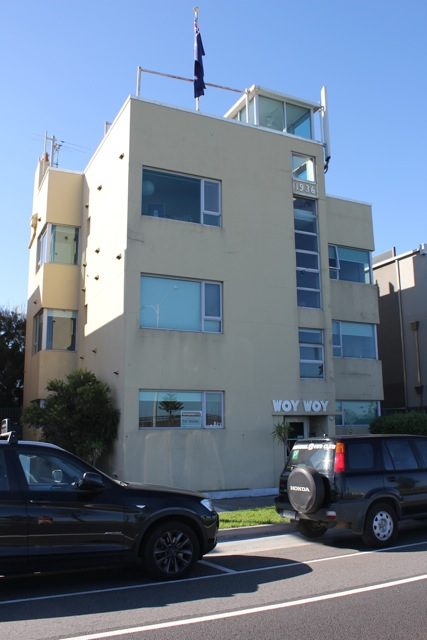
Woy Woy, 77 Marine Parade, Elwood, Victoria, Australia. First modernist block of flats in Melbourne. Designed by Mewton & Gounds.

=== Places of worship ===
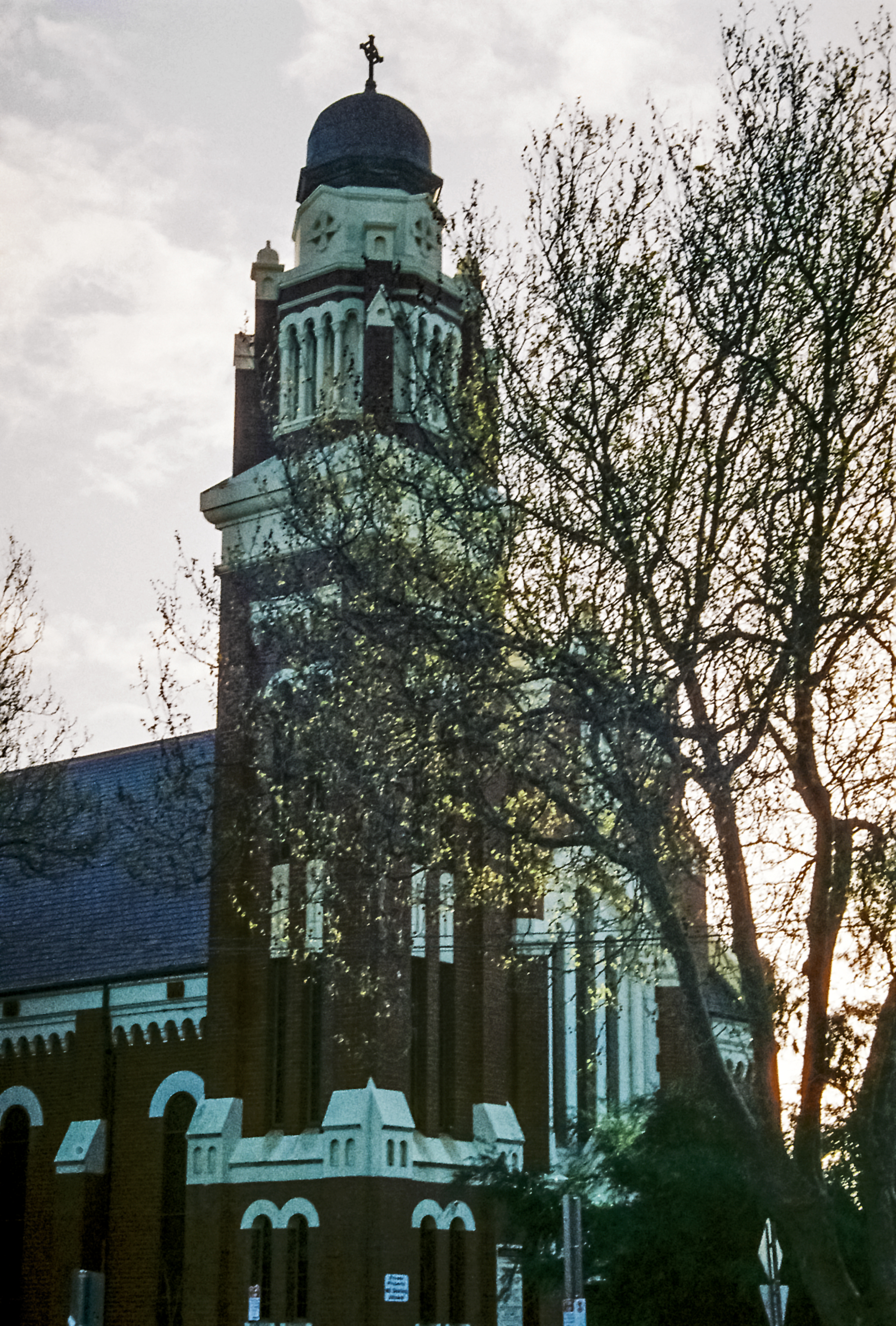
St Columba's Elwood

- St. Columba's Catholic Church and school, 26 Glen Huntly Road, opened in 1927.
- Elwood Presbyterian, 31A Scott Street.
- Elwood Shule, congregation established in 1938, first stage of present building at 39 Dickens Street. Opened 1957.

== Education ==
Elwood houses a number of schools, considering its limited area. There are 2 primary schools, one offers a catholic education. Saint Columba's Primary is located adjacent to the church and has access to a large number of facilities. There is also a large public school, Elwood Primary School. Elwood is also serviced by a local secondary school, Elwood College, previously named Elwood High School.

== Sport ==
Elwood Sailing Club was founded in 1924 as Elwood Sea Canoe Club and has since hosted many national and international championships, including 12m2 Sharpie sailing in the 1956 Melbourne Olympics and the 2005 World Formula Windsurfing Titles. ESC now boasts extensive sailing, training and social facilities and the clubrooms are available to the general public for function hire. Elwood has a full-time lifesaving club.

An active Triathlon club operates in Elwood and the main beach hosts several triathlons each year.

Elwood Park is home to a touch football club, tennis club and croquet club. Between 1881 and 1980 there was Elwood Football Club (soccer), later reforming as Elwood City Soccer Club.

There is an Elwood Bowls club located at Elsternwick Park, in front of the Elsternwick Hotel. The clubhouse acts as a venue for various events.

== Transport ==
The main form of transport is the private automobile and bus. The major roads are on its periphery and include multi-lane Brighton Road, Marine Parade, Barkly Street and Glen Huntly Road.

Elwood was once serviced by two tram routes, the St Kilda to Brighton "electric street railway" which was operated by the Victorian Railways, and the route 11 tram between East Malvern and Point Ormond which was operated by MMTB. The St Kilda to Brighton route ran north-south through Elwood, via Mitford St, Broadway, Ormond Rd, and St Kilda Rd. The route 11 tram ran east-west, along Glen Huntly Rd, crossing paths with the St Kilda to Brighton route at Elwood Junction.

Elwood is serviced by the Bayside Trail bicycle path. This path is used by commuters and also recreationally and it includes a roller-skating path, used by rollerbladers.

Tram route 67 (Carnegie) runs along the northern boundary of the suburb, along Brighton Road/Nepean Highway to the city or via Elsternwick (past Elsternwick railway station) to Carnegie.

The nearest railway stations are about beyond the northern boundary of the suburb, at either Ripponlea or Elsternwick (both across Brighton Road/Nepean Highway).

Elwood is also served by a number of bus routes:

- Number 630 runs from Ormond Road Elwood to Gardenvale Station, Ormond Station, Huntingdale to Monash University in Clayton.
- Number 923 runs from St Kilda to Elwood, Brighton Beach, Sandringham to Westfield Southland.
- Number 246 runs from Elsternwick railway station, via Elwood, Prahran, South Yarra, Richmond, Collingwood (all via Punt Road) and up to Clifton Hill.

== Street names ==
Many of the streets in Elwood are named after things related to the beach. These streets include Beach Avenue, Spray Street, Wave Street, Tide Street and Foam Street. Other streets in the area are named after famous anglophone writers, essayists and poets, such as Shakespeare Grove, Dickens Street, Milton Street, Wordsworth Street, Byron Street, Keats Street, Tennyson Street, Poets Grove, Ruskin Street and Shelley Street.

== Notable residents ==
- Ruth Borgobello
- Joe Camilleri
- Rodger Corser
- Louise Crawford
- Brian Dixon
- Esmond Dorney
- Vincent Fantauzzo
- Belle Gibson
- Germaine Greer
- Alex Gurney
- Paul Hester
- Mark Holden
- Ken James
- Asher Keddie
- Bridget McKenzie
- Brad Miller
- Matt Parkinson
- Roland Perry
- Ronald Ryan
- Magda Szubanski
- Jane Turner
- Sam Wood

== Sunsets ==
Like many of the beaches in Melbourne, Elwood is known for its spectacular sunsets.

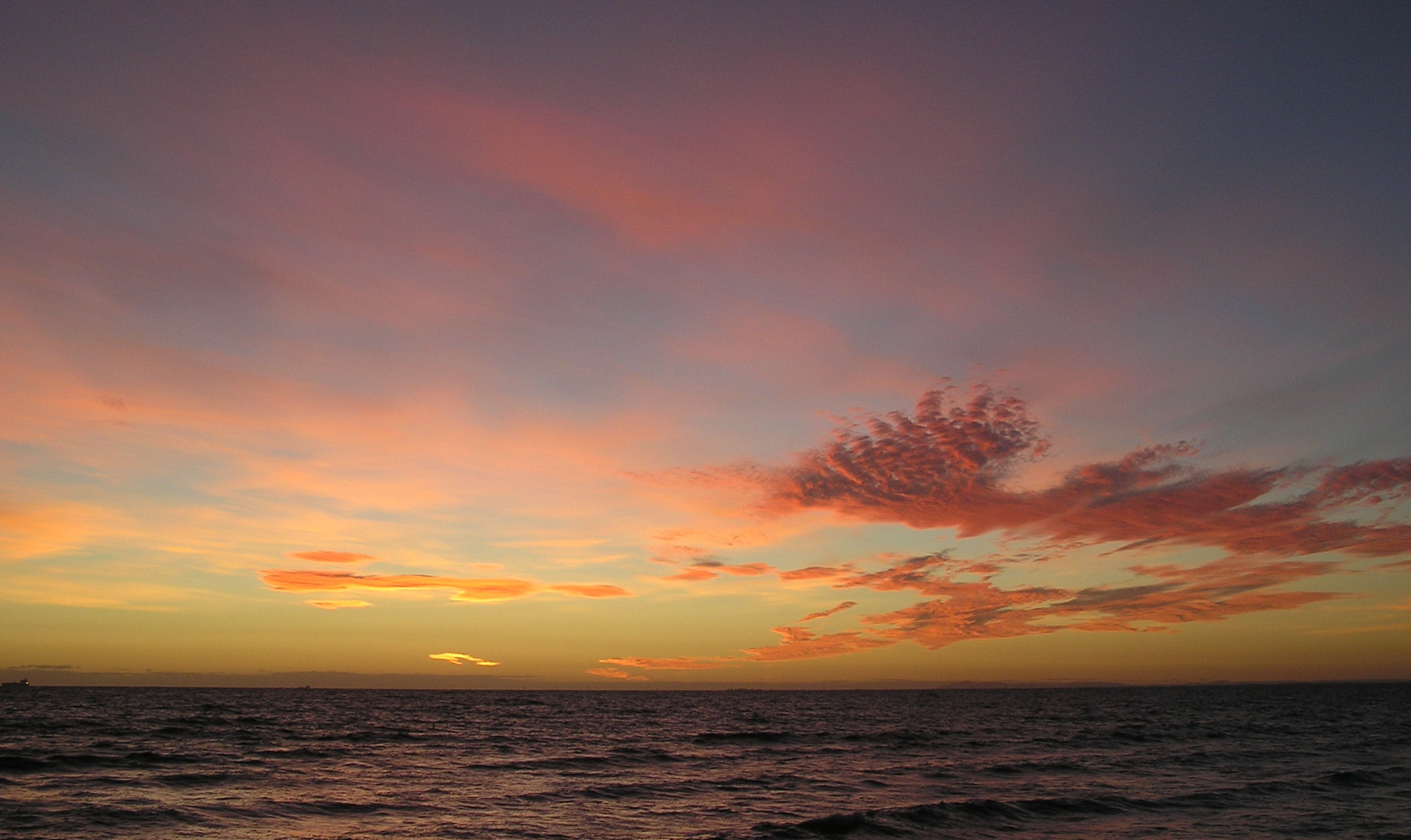
Elwood Beach at dusk

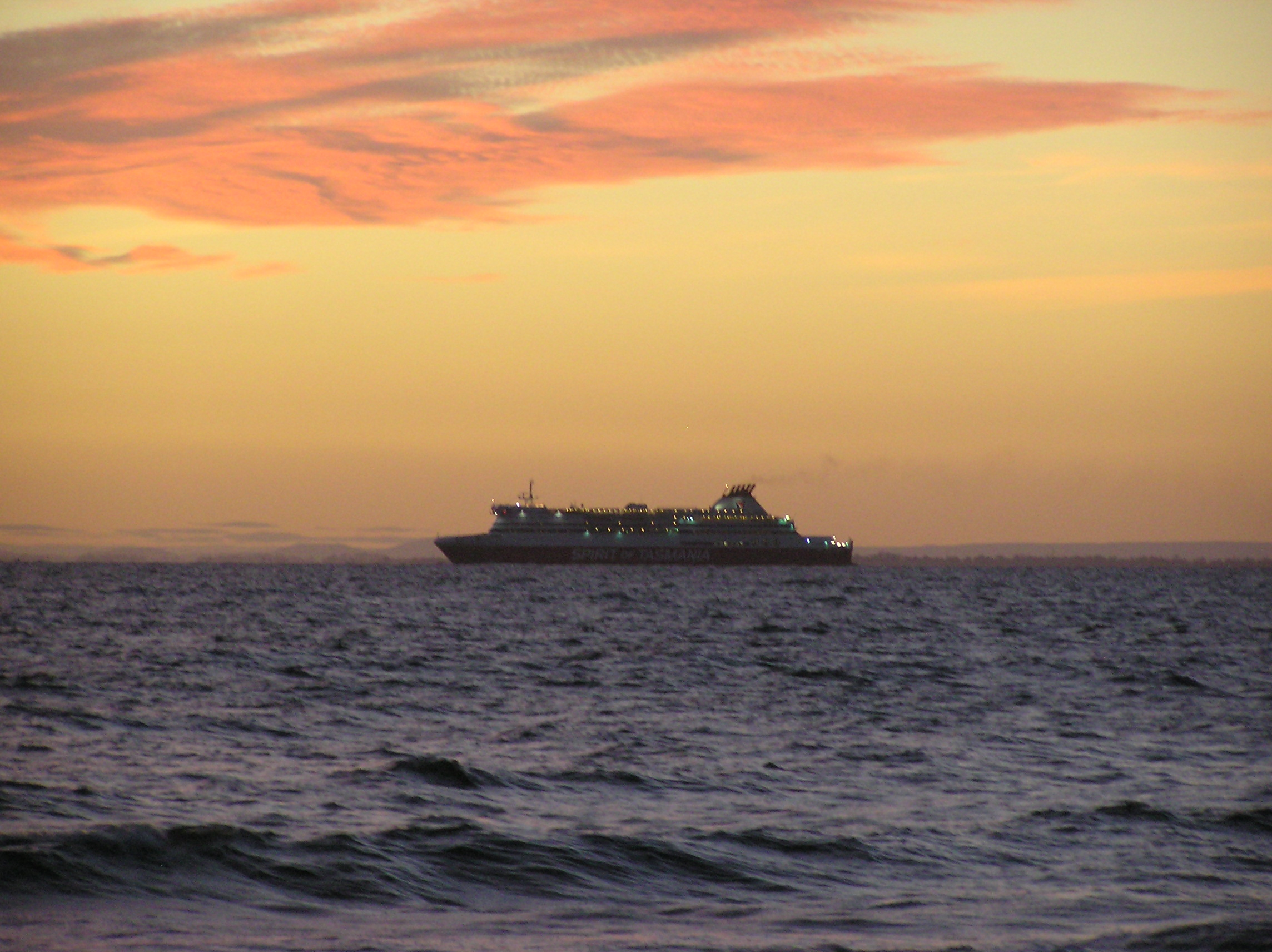
The Spirit of Tasmania sailing through Port Phillip in dusk seen from Elwood Beach

== See also ==
- City of St Kilda – Elwood was previously within this former local government area.
