= Les Dixon =

Australian cartoonist

- Born: Leslie Charles Brailey; 25 July 1910; Sydney, Australia
- Died: December 2002 (aged 92); Central Coast, New South Wales, Australia
- Occupations: Cartoonist, illustrator
- Writing career
- Period: 1941–1989

Leslie Dixon ( 25 July 1910 – December 2002), was an Australian cartoonist and commercial artist.

== Biography ==
Dixon was born Leslie Charles Brailey in Sydney on 25 July 1910 and adopted by Charles and Lillian Dixon when he was only six months old. He attended primary schools in the Sydney suburbs of Drummoyne and Balmain before moving to Cobargo in 1918 with his family, on a venture of stripping wattle bark, trapping rabbits and share dairy farming. During this time he completed most of his schooling via correspondence from the Plunkett Street School in Sydney. He commenced his formal art training in 1924 when, at age 14, he signed up for an art correspondence course promoted by the Australian painter Harry J. Weston. In 1929 Dixon returned to Sydney working as a blacksmith's striker for six months before joining the Vacuum Oil Company as a truck driver. He continued to take art lessons by correspondence.

In 1931 he married Ella May Laws (died 1975) in South Balmain, New South Wales.

At the age of 28, he was involved in a traffic accident in Erskineville, sustaining a fracture at the base of the skull and dislocating his spine. As a result of his injuries he was forced to leave the oil company. While on the dole, he studied life drawing at the Catholic Guild, Sydney. During this time he became a freelance artist, selling illustrations and comics to magazines such as Smith's Weekly, The Bulletin and Rydges Business Journal and drew comic stories for Frank Johnson Publications.

He enlisted in the Australian Army on 22 January 1942 in Gladesville, New South Wales but was discharged three months later on 5 May 1942 as his earlier injuries prevented him from wearing a tin hat.

Dixon then joined the staff of Smith's Weekly in 1942 and remained there until 1949 just before folded in October 1950. When Jim Russell left Smith's he was appointed the Art Editor but the position was never ratified before the paper closed down. He then became Art Editor for the Sydney Production unit of The Courier-Mail, where he remained until February 1957 when he took over responsibility for Bluey and Curley, following the death of Norman Rice in a car accident on 31 December 1956. Rice having succeeded from the strip's creator, Alex Gurney in 1956. He continued to produce the comic strip for eighteen years until it was retired on 26 July 1975. During his time on Bluey and Curley Dixon gradually altered the art style and introduced new characters including 'Jazzer', a swagman; and 'Trotters', an old reprobate, to assist in the strip's popularity.

I was bloody unhappy for about three years. It's so hard taking over someone else's creation. You don't have that man's style. You don't have his sense of humour. But eventually my own Bluey and Curley evolved. When I started they were a couple of layabouts. I gave them a job. They were in the construction industry and that enabled me to put them anywhere in Australia. On city building sites. In country towns. On properties out in the bush. They were the archetypal Aussie blokes who didn't give a bugger about anyone.

— Les Dixon

Dixon also created the comic strips, Little Trump and Phill Dill (about a man "whose life zigzags from one bumbling crisis to another").

In his retirement, Dixon drew a strip, Sandy Lakes, about a hale and hearty pensioner, which was published in the Central Coast Express Advocate in 1976 and ran for thirteen years.

Dixon was made a life member of the Australian Black and White Artists' Club in 1991 and was awarded a Silver Stanley in 1994 for his contribution to Australian cartooning.

== Bibliography ==
- Dixon, Les, 1910–2003; Bowden, Ros (1995), Interview with Les Dixon [sound recording] / interviewer, Ros Bowden
- Biographical cuttings on Les Dixon, cartoonist, containing one or more cuttings from newspapers or journals, 1900
