= Williamstown Chronicle =

Former newspaper in Melbourne, Victoria, Australia

The Williamstown Chronicle was a weekly newspaper published in Williamstown, Victoria, a suburb of Melbourne.

Publication began in May 1854, trading under the name Williamstown Trade Circular. In September 1856, the name was changed to the Williamstown Chronicle, which lasted until the paper was absorbed by The Williamstown Advertiser in 1964.

The Williamstown Chronicle was the first newspaper for the area and the third suburban newspaper to exist in Australia. It was started by John Bennett Stephens, who produced the paper in his office in Ann Street and distributed it for free. The paper lost currency in 1874, which led to John. B. Stephens standing aside as editor. His son, J. C. Stephens, took over as editor, promising to create a "re-modelled and enlarged" version of the paper. J. C. Stephens was unsuccessful at his venture, and by 1880 the paper had been bought by Robert G. Neale. As the new editor, he enlarged the paper to 46 columns by 1882.

After competing with the Williamstown Advertiser (started 1874) for over a decade, Neale decided to sell the paper in 1892. Ownership passed into the hands of Mr Bower and Frank Young, who retained control until 1933 when Bower retired, leaving Young as the paper's sole proprietor.
