= Bluey and Curley =

- First appearance: 1939
- Created by: Alex Gurney

Bluey and Curley is an Australian newspaper comic strip written by the Australian artist, caricaturist, and cartoonist Alex Gurney.

Few original Bluey and Curley strips are held in public collections, because Gurney often gave the original art work of his caricatures, cartoons, and comic strips to anyone who asked. Following Gurney's death in 1955, the strip was taken over by Norm Rice in early 1956, but he died in a vehicle accident that year. Bluey and Curley was then taken over by cartoonist Les Dixon who drew it for 18 years until he retired in 1975.

== Characters ==
The first Bluey and Curley strip appeared soon after the start of World War II. It featured two Australian soldiers, Bluey (who had served in the First AIF), and Curley, a new recruit.

By the end of the war, they had served in every Australian campaign — in North Africa, in the Middle East, in New Guinea, in Northern Australia, and in the Pacific Islands — and, once the war was over, they even went to London and took part in the 1946 Victory Parade.

Bluey and Curley epitomised what was seen as the typical Australian soldier. They liked a drink, a gamble and a chat (in colourful Aussie slang of course), and they always had some scheme afoot. They had a healthy disregard for officers and regulations and were quick to bring down any mates who were getting too big for their boots. Despite their larrikin streak, they were fearless, resilient and skilled in battle.
Alex Gurney, the creator of Bluey & Curley, produced the strip from 1940 until his death in 1955. It was syndicated across Australia and appeared in New Zealand, New Guinea, and Canada (but was considered too Australian for American newspapers).

== Creation ==
By 1939, Alex Gurney was already well established as a caricaturist, cartoonist, and comic strip artist.

In late 1939, following the outbreak of World War II, he created his most famous characters, Bluey and Curley, which first appeared in the Picture-News magazine.

He applied for the copyright registration of Bluey and Curley on 16 October 1939; and his application was granted on 9 November 1939 (Australian Copyright No.6921).

== Syndication ==
It was transferred to The Sun News-Pictorial in 1940, from whence it was syndicated throughout Australia, New Zealand and Canada.

== Cultural impact ==
The strip featured a pair of soldiers, "Bluey" (named for his red hair), the Great War veteran who had re-enlisted in the second A.I.F., and Curley (named for his extremely curly hair), the new recruit to the A.I.F.

The strip was widely appreciated for the good-humoured way it depicted the Australian "diggers" and their "mateship", as well as for its realistic use of Australian idiom of the day.

== Service life ==
Gurney visited army camps throughout Australia and New Guinea to ensure authenticity. While in New Guinea he contracted malaria and was incapacitated for some time.

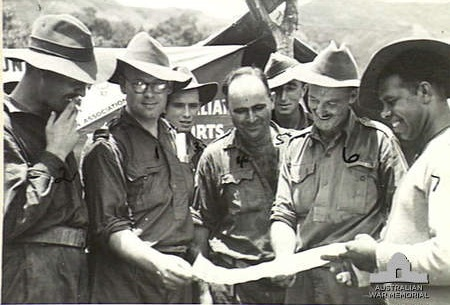
Gurney (second from left) giving the original art of a Bluey and Curley strip to soldiers of the 2/12th Battalion in New Guinea, 1944.

== Post-war life ==
Gurney was in England in June 1946, as part of an Australian Press Syndicate sent specifically to view the Victory Parade. As well as sending caricatures of various eminent people involved in that parade back to Australia for distribution through the press, he also used the opportunity to have Bluey and Curley attend the parade, and a number of his Bluey and Curley comic strips reflected that event.

Gurney's visit to London, and his version of events, as seen through his Bluey and Curley comic strip, was also historically significant for another reason: it was the first time that a newspaper comic strip had ever been transmitted from England to Australia by radio.

Although Bluey and Curley were popular with Australians because they related to the slang, attitude, and the lack of respect towards authority exhibited by the main characters, the strip lost some of its appeal and readership when the pair returned to "civvy street".

== Gurney's death ==
Gurney died suddenly, of heart disease, on 4 December 1955. He had collapsed in his car parked outside his home.

== Post-Gurney ==
The strip was later drawn by Norman Howard Rice (1911–1956). Rice died as the result of a car accident on 31 December 1956 (New Year's Eve). The strip was then drawn by Les Dixon from 1957 until 1975.

== Film ==
The comic was adapted into a TV film Mud, Bloody Mud in 1985.

=== The Original ===
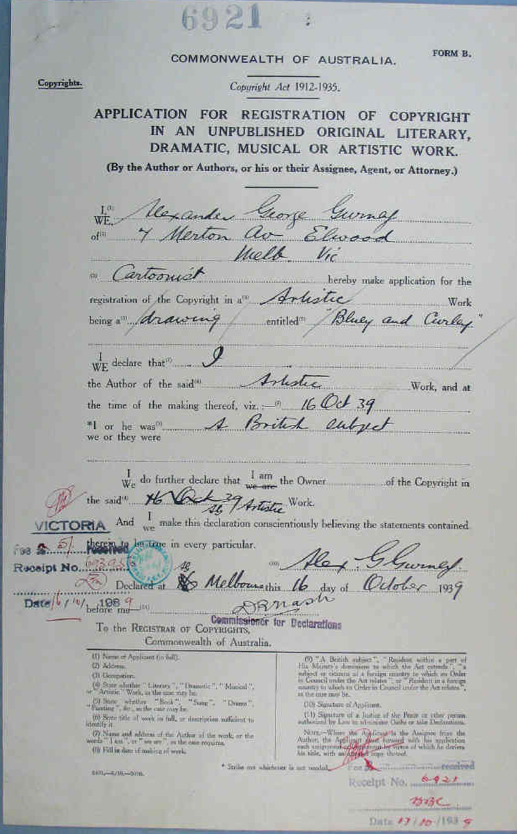
Copyright Application, 1939.
