= Morewood =

Morewood is a surname and a given name. Notable people with the name include:

Surname:

- Ellen Morewood (1740–1824), English colliery owner based at Alfreton Hall in Derbyshire
- Hayley Morewood (born 1984), women's association footballer, represented New Zealand at international level
- Sarah Morewood (1823–1863), American poet and literary figure, friend of Herman Melville
- Steven Morewood, Senior Lecturer of International History at the University of Birmingham

Given name:

- J. Morewood Dowsett (1864–1955), English big-game hunter, naturalist and writer
- Joseph Morewood Staniforth (1864–1921), Welsh editorial cartoonist

== See also ==
- Morewood, Ontario township in Eastern Ontario, Canada
- Morewood, Pennsylvania, coal town in Westmoreland County, Pennsylvania, United States
- Morewood massacre, armed labor-union conflict in Morewood, Pennsylvania, United States
- Morewood School, historic one-room schoolhouse in Pittsfield, Berkshire County, Massachusetts
- Morwood, surname page
