= Tarpey =

Tarpey is a surname. Notable people with the surname include:

- Andrew Tarpey (born 1965), Australian rules footballer
- Dave Tarpey (born 1988), English footballer
- Howard Tarpey (born 1958), Australian rules footballer
- Hugh Tarpey (1821–1898), Irish politician
- James Tarpey (fl. 2012), British actor
- Terry Tarpey (born 1994), French–American basketball player

== See also ==
- Tarpey Village, California
