= Morwood =

Morwood is a surname. Notable people with the surname include:

- James Morwood (1943–2017), English classicist and author
- Mike Morwood (1950–2013), Australian archeologist
- Paul Morwood (born 1959), Australian rules footballer
- Peter Morwood (1956–2025), Irish fantasy novelist and screenwriter
- Phil Morwood (born 1982), Australian rugby league player
- Shane Morwood (born 1961), Australian rules footballer
- Tony Morwood (born 1960), Australian rules footballer
