= Hawthorne, Queensland =

Hawthorne
- Suburb
- Hawthorne Ferry Terminal at Hardcastle Park

- Interactive map of Hawthorne
- Coordinates: 27.4666°S 153.0583°E
- Country: Australia
- State: Queensland
- City: Brisbane
- LGA: City of Brisbane (Morningside Ward)
- Location: 6.5 km (4.0 mi) E of Brisbane CBD

Government
  - State electorate: Bulimba
  - Federal division: Griffith

Area
  - Total: 1.3 km^{2} (0.50 sq mi)

Population
  - Total: 5,090 (2021 census)
  - Density: 3,920/km^{2} (10,100/sq mi)
- Time zone: UTC+10:00 (AEST)
- Postcode: 4171
Suburbs around Hawthorne
| Teneriffe | Bulimba | Balmoral |
| New Farm | Hawthorne | Morningside |
| New Farm | Norman Park | Morningside |

Hawthorne is an inner-city suburb of the City of Brisbane, Queensland, Australia.

Characterised by its tree-lined avenues, traditional Queenslander homes, boutique shops, cinema precinct, and proximity to the Brisbane River, this upscale suburb is predominantly residential and forms part of the affluent 4171 postcode, along with Bulimba and Balmoral.

Hawthorne has been recognised by several publications as one of Brisbane's most desirable residential suburbs. Mint Equity's Best Suburbs to Live in Brisbane ranked Hawthorne first among Brisbane's eastern suburbs, highlighting its combination of traditional Queenslander and modern homes, proximity to the CBD, dining and entertainment options, schools, parks and access to the river.

Brisbane Beacon similarly identified Bulimba and Hawthorne as its preferred suburbs for Brisbane's east side. The publication distinguished Hawthorne from neighbouring Bulimba as the quieter of the two suburbs, highlighting its leafy streets and comparatively lower levels of traffic.

== Geography ==
Hawthorne is located 6.5 kilometres (4.0 mi) by road east of the Brisbane CBD and covers an area of approximately 1.3 square kilometres.

Unlike many other inner-Brisbane suburbs, no major arterial or state-controlled roads pass through Hawthorne, contributing to its relatively quiet, village-like character.

== Toponymy ==
There are two theories about the name of the suburb. One is that butcher William Baynes purchased land in the area in 1875 and named the area after Hawthorn in Melbourne where he lived before his arrival in Queensland in 1859. An alternative theory is that Baynes planted many hawthorne bushes in the 1850s and 1860s.

== History ==
Hawthorne started as a farming district in the 1860s, and was gradually subdivided as Brisbane grew. This was helped by the introduction of ferry and tram services.

In February 1885, the "Hawthorne Estate" was advertised for sale by Arthur Martin & Co. The reverse of the advertisement included a sketch of the Hawthorne Estate from across the river.

In October 1885, the "Galloway's Hill Estate" was advertised to be auctioned by Arthur Martin & Co. A map shows the blocks, including river front land, in Wendell Street, Waldo Street, and adjoining land in Hawthorne Road.

The "Oak Park Estate", made up of blocks on Orchard Street, Park Street and Oak Street, was first advertised for sale in September 1885. A map advertising 33 allotments in the estate to be auctioned on 13 August 1887 shows the auctioneer was G.T. Bell & Co. Due to inclement weather that sale was postponed to 20 August 1887.

The "Bulimba Road Estate", made up of 200 blocks near the Hawthorne Estate, was advertised for sale in June 1887. A map advertising the estate shows the blocks near Bulimba Road (now Hawthorne Road) for auction by Arthur Martin & Co.

The "Bulimba Park Estate", comprising 78 allotments in the area that is now Mullens Street, Barton Road and adjoining lots on Hawthorne Road and Riding Road, was advertised for sale in November 1887. A map of the estate notes the seller of the land as the Metropolitan Freehold Land & Building Company Limited, and the auctioneer as G.T. Bell.

In November 1888, the "Circular Quay Estate", made up of 40 allotments, including six riverfront blocks, within five minutes' walk to the Bulimba steam ferry, was advertised to be auctioned by John Macnamara & Co. A map shows the lots in the area of land currently bordered by Leura Avenue.

On 14 November 1914, a Church of Church was erected in a day. A Bible school had been previously established in 1912 by Mr R. Halgh, using a hall near the Hawthorne ferry terminal. In 1970, the building was raised and renovated with the addition of a ground hall for use as a hall.

Lourdes Hill College was established in February 1916 by the Sisters of the Good Samaritan. It was officially dedicated on Sunday 7 May 1916 by Roman Catholic Archbishop of Brisbane, James Duhig.

In September 1935, "Barton Lodge Estate", comprising six blocks on Barton Road and Gordon Street, were advertised to be auctioned by Cameron Bros. A map advertising the auction shows three of the blocks with river frontage and all within walking distance of the Hawthorne ferry and the Balmoral tram terminus.

== Demographics ==
In the 2021 Australian Census, Hawthorne had a population of 5,090 people, of whom 52.3% were female and 47.7% were male. The median age of the population was 37. The median weekly household income was $3,029, compared with $1,675 across Queensland.

Hawthorne has a highly educated and professional population. Of residents aged 15 years and over, 47.6% held a bachelor's degree or higher, compared with 21.9% across Queensland. Professionals accounted for 35.7% of employed residents and managers a further 21.3%.

Of Hawthorne's families, 51.8% were couple families with children, while 33.8% were couples without children and 12.9% were one-parent families.

Some 75.7% of residents were born in Australia. The most common overseas countries of birth were England (5.2%), New Zealand (3.2%), South Africa (1.3%), the United States (0.9%) and Scotland (0.8%). The commonly reported ancestry were English (41.7%), Australian (33.9%), Irish (16.5%), Scottish 14.1%) and German (5.6%).

=== Real Estate ===
Hawthorne is regarded as one of Brisbane's blue-chip residential property markets, with some of the suburb's most valuable homes concentrated along the river. The suburb has repeatedly featured in analyses of Brisbane's wealthiest areas, with river frontage, larger allotments, city and river views, proximity to the CBD and the limited supply contributing to the high values.

Cotality/Corelogic's Best of the Best 2024 report included Hawthorne fifth among the 10 most expensive house suburbs in Greater Brisbane, with neighbouring Bulimba ranked seventh.

In a 2024 analysis of Brisbane's most expensive streets by Ray White Group, Hawthorne was one of the few suburbs suburbs to have two streets represented in the top ten, with Virginia Avenue ranked second and Aaron Avenue ranked seventh. Virginia Avenue has recorded several significant prestige-property transactions, including a $15 million riverfront sale in 2021.

The highest reported property sale in Hawthorne in FY 2023/2024 was $11.38 million.

For August 2025 to July 2026, Hawthorne's median house price sits at $2.41 million with a median unit price of $1.04 million.

== Education ==
=== Private ===
Lourdes Hill College is an independent Catholic school (years 5–12) for girls located at 86 Hawthorne Road. The college was founded in 1916 by the Sisters of the Good Samaritan of the Order of St Benedict and continues to operate in the Benedictine tradition. In 2025, Lourdes Hill expanded to include Years 5 and 6 for the first time, welcoming 170 students and increasing its total enrolment to 1,227 students.

For the class of 2025, Lourdes Hill College reported that 35.2% of known ATARs were above 90, 16.5% were above 95, and 2.8% were above 98.9. For context, across Queensland, just over 24% of ATAR-eligible students achieved 90 or above in 2025. The school also reported that 99% of eligible students received a Queensland Certificate of Education (QCE).

In independent school rankings, Schools360 ranked Lourdes Hill as the 10th-highest-rated private school in Queensland, from 133 schools assessed, awarding the school an overall score of 86.1%. SchoolRank AU awarded Lourdes Hill an overall grade of B+ (67 out of 100), placing the college within the top 13% of schools nationally.

Sts Peters and Paul's School is a co-educational Catholic primary (Prep-6) school at 33 Alexandra Street, Bulimba. In 2025, the school had an enrolment of 549 students with 31 teachers and 20 non-teaching staff.

=== Public ===
There are no state schools in Hawthorne.

The nearest state primary schools are Bulimba State School in neighbouring Bulimba to the north, Morningside State School in neighbouring Morningside to the east, and Norman Park State School in neighbouring Norman Park to the south. The nearest government secondary school is Balmoral State High School in neighbouring Balmoral.

== Landmarks ==
The Hawthorne Cinema complex, on Hawthorne Road, is a classic theatre. Opened in the 1940s it contains a large curved screen - one of the largest in Brisbane, as well as 2 smaller screens. Surrounding the cinema precinct are several restaurants, cafes, and boutiques.

Hawthorne Park is a public park located between Hawthorne Road and Riding Road. The park occupies approximately 7.2 hectares and contains sporting fields, walking and cycling paths, outdoor fitness facilities, picnic and barbecue areas, and a children's playground known as Livvi's Place. Hawthorne Park is home to the Morningside Panthers AFL Club.

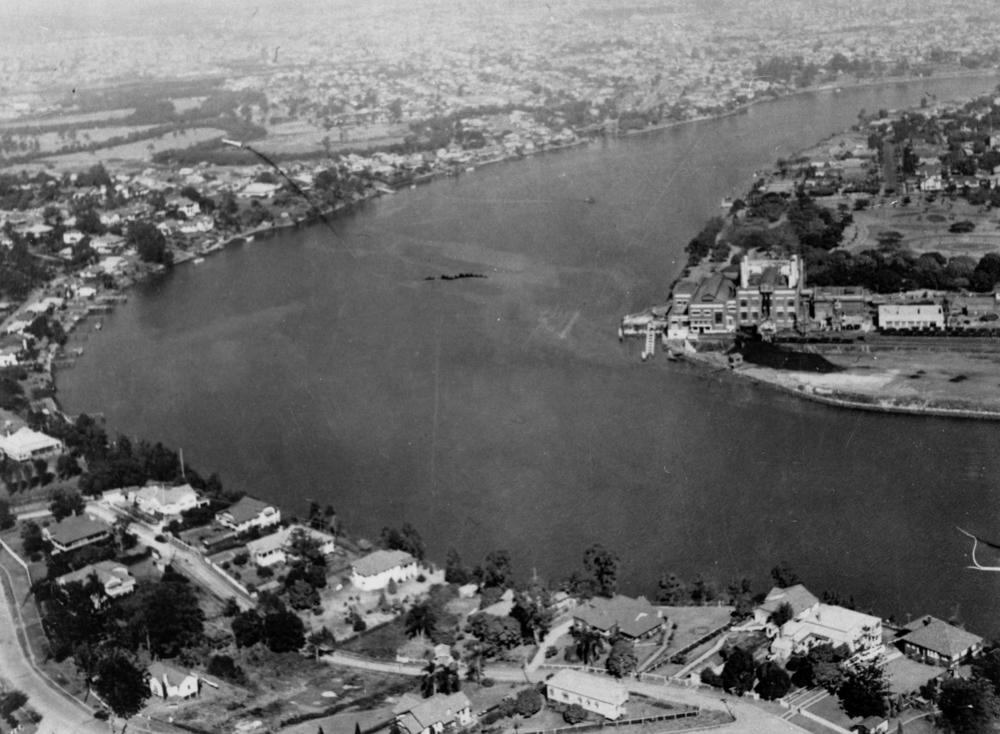
Aerial view of Hawthorne taken in 1947

== Heritage listings ==
Hawthorne has a number of heritage-listed sites, including:

- 35 Amy Street: House
- 62 Balmoral Street: Brethrens Meeting Room
- 142 Barton Road: House
- 156 Barton Road: Airdrie
- 28 Gordon Street: Hawthorne Ferry Terminal & Hardcastle Park
- 46 Hawthorne Road: Halcyon
- 86 Hawthorne Road: Lourdes Hill College
- 159 Hawthorne Road: former Hawthorne Presbyterian Church
- 25 Virginia Avenue: House

== Transport ==
Hawthorne is well serviced by public transport with Brisbane City Council Bus and CityCat services and is within close proximity to Morningside railway station.

=== Ferry ===
The Hawthorne Ferry Terminal provides CityCat services to Brisbane CBD, South Bank Parklands, and other suburbs on the CityCat network.

=== Train ===
Hawthorne is located under 2 km (1.2 mi) away from Morningside railway station, which provides Queensland Rail City network services on the Cleveland line.

=== Bus ===
Hawthorne is serviced by two bus routes, the 230 and the 232. Each bus route provides access to the Brisbane CBD, Fortitude Valley as well as other suburbs listed below.

Bus Routes:
230: Bulimba, Riding Rd, Gabba, South Brisbane, City, Valley
232: Cannon Hill, Balmoral, Bulimba, East Brisbane, Fortitude Valley, City
