= Morningside Australian Football Club =

Coordinates: 27°27′49.58″S 153°03′46.02″E

Morningside

Names
- Full name: Morningside Australian Football Club
- Nickname: Panthers
- Club song: To the tune of "You're a Grand Old Flag"

2026 QAFL season
- After finals: 2nd (Runners Up)
- Home-and-away season: 2nd

Club details
- Founded: 1947; 79 years ago
- Competition: QAFL: Senior men QAFLW: Senior women QWFL: Wheelchair (mixed); AFLBJ: Juniors (mixed)
- President: Paul Mazzoletti
- Coach: Paul Egan
- Premierships: QAFL: 11 (1965, 1991, 1993, 1994, 2003, 2004, 2009, 2010, 2014, 2020, 2024)
- Ground: Jack Esplen Oval, Hawthorne

Uniforms
Home

Other information
- Official website: morningsidepanthers.com.au

The Morningside Australian Football Club, nicknamed the Panthers, is an Australian rules football club based at Jack Esplen Oval in the suburb of Hawthorne in Brisbane. The club consists of Masters, Amateurs, Women's, Junior and Senior football sections. Its senior team competed in the North East Australian Football League (NEAFL) competition from 2011 to 2013 and now is a member club of the Queensland Australian Football League. Its junior sides compete in the AFL Brisbane Juniors (AFLBJ) competition. The club also caters for young girls and boys by running Auskick skills clinics, which are held at the beginning of the season and do not involve competitive games.

Morningside has operated successfully as a football club in Brisbane for over 50 years and is one of the most widely recognised Queensland based AFL clubs within Australia. It developed from the Hawthorne Juniors club, which was founded in 1931.

== Recent history ==
At the beginning of the 2000 season, the members of both clubs voted unanimously to join and form one united club. This decision was made to strengthen the club socially, financially and to improve the junior player development programmes and created a player path to the elite AFLQ State League competition.

Morningside has provided some of the best Queensland-bred Australian rules footballers of the last 50 years, including triple-premiership winning Brisbane Lions captain Michael Voss and his teammate fullback Mal Michael, Voss's brother Brett Voss (who played at Brisbane and St Kilda). Current players include Keidean Coleman, who currently plays at Brisbane Lions Football Club and Ben Keays who captains, Adelaide Crows Football Club.

At the beginning of 2011, the QAFL was merged to form the "North-East Australian Football League", combining Sydney and Canberra teams with the best QAFL teams, including the Northern Territory Thunder, Gold Coast Suns, GWS and Sydney Swans reserves team all compete in the competition as well as the Brisbane Lions reserves. There are two conferences with Morningside playing in the Northern Conference alongside fellow rivals Mt Gravatt and Southport, among others.

In the NEAFL's inaugural year, Morningside played Northern Territory in the Northern Conference Final, in which they were beaten by 87 points. Northern Territory went on to beat Eastern champion Ainslie.

In 2023 it was announced former Brisbane Lions and Carlton Football Club star, Mitch Robinson would play for Morningside's Senior men's side in the 2023 QAFL season.

== Honours ==
- AFL Queensland (11): 1965, 1991, 1993, 1994, 2003, 2004, 2009, 2010, 2014, 2020, 2024

=== Grand Finals detail ===
Year	Rival	Score	Venue
1965	Mayne Tigers	20.15 (135) – 9.8 (62)	The Gabba
1991	Southport Sharks	18.24 (132) – 9.17 (71)	The Gabba
1993	Southport Sharks	16.22 (118) – 8.9 (57)	Gabba
1994	Kedron Grange	12.11 (83) – 12.9 (81)	Gabba
2003	Mount Gravatt Vultures	17.13 (115) – 7.10 (52)	Giffin Park
2004	Southport Sharks	12.18 (90) – 12.11 (83)	Giffin Park
2009	Mount Gravatt Vultures	14.10 (94) – 8.15 (63)	Giffin Park
2010	Labrador Tigers	17.16 (118) – 14.12 (96)	Giffin Park
2014	Labrador Tigers	22.17 (149) – 15.6 (96)	Leyshon Park
2020	Broadbeach Cats	8.11 (59) – 7.8 (50)	Leyshon Park
2024	Redland-Victoria Point	9.12 (66) – 8.13 (61)	Brighton Homes Arena

=== Individual ===
==== Grogan Medallists ====
The Grogan Medal is awarded to the best and fairest player in an AFLQ season.

- Noel McGuinness 1953
- Henry Maguire 1955
- Keith Farnsworth 1957
- Merv Dihm 1960
- Terry Johnston 1967
- Jeff Ebert 1974
- John Blair 1982
- Daryl Bourke 1989 & 1993
- Ricky Chapman 1992
- Mitchell Howe 1994
- Dean Edwards 1998
- Jacob Gough 2003
- Nathan Kinch 2008
- Matthew Payne 2020

==== QAFL Top Goalkickers ====
- Gary Jones (114) – 1974
- Gary Jones (124) – 1975
- Gary Jones (142) – 1976
- J. Newton (81) – 1979
- J. Blair (86) – 1985
- J. Manson (106) – 1986
- Darren Vickery (95) – 1989
- Darren Vickery (117) – 1990
- Darren Vickery (100) – 1991
- Darren Vickery (81) – 1992
- M. Russell (83) – 1994
- M. Russell (105) – 1995
- M. Russell (101) – 1997
- Matthew Hammelmann (34) – 2020

== AFL/VFL players ==
There is a list of past and present Morningside players who have played at AFL/VFL:

- Jackson Allen (Gold Coast)
- David Armitage (St. Kilda)
- Tom Bell (Carlton and Brisbane Lions)
- John Blair (South Melbourne, Fitzroy and St. Kilda)
- Daryl Bourke (Melbourne)
- Jordon Bourke (Brisbane Lions)
- Scott Clouston (Brisbane Lions)
- Keidean Coleman (Brisbane Lions)
- Blake Coleman (Brisbane Lions)
- Courtenay Dempsey (Essendon)
- Barry Denny (Melbourne)
- Terry Devery (Footscray)
- Merv Dihm (St. Kilda)
- Brad Edwards (Fitzroy and Brisbane Bears)
- Matthew Hammelmann (Brisbane Lions)
- Scott Harding (Brisbane Lions and Port Adelaide)
- Jack Henry (Essendon)
- Tom Hickey (Gold Coast and St. Kilda)
- Warren Jones (Carlton and St. Kilda)
- Ben Keays (Brisbane Lions and Adelaide)
- Will Ashcroft (Brisbane Lions)
- Stephen Kenna (Carlton)
- Tony Lynn (Brisbane Lions and Carlton)
- Mal Michael (Collingwood, Brisbane Lions and Essendon)
- Rick Norman (North Melbourne and Brisbane Bears)
- Paul Peos (West Coast Eagles and Brisbane Bears)
- Tony Smith (Sydney Swans)
- Lee Spurr (Fremantle)
- Howard Tarpey (South Melbourne)
- Gavin Urquhart (North Melbourne)
- Brett Voss (Brisbane Lions and St. Kilda)
- Michael Voss (Brisbane Bears and Brisbane Lions)
- John Waddington (North Melbourne)
- David Wearne (Brisbane Bears)
- John Williams (Essendon)
- Tom Williams (Western Bulldogs)
- Peter Yagmoor (Collingwood)
- Mitch Robinson (Carlton and Brisbane Lions)
