= Morningside, Queensland =

Morningside
- Suburb
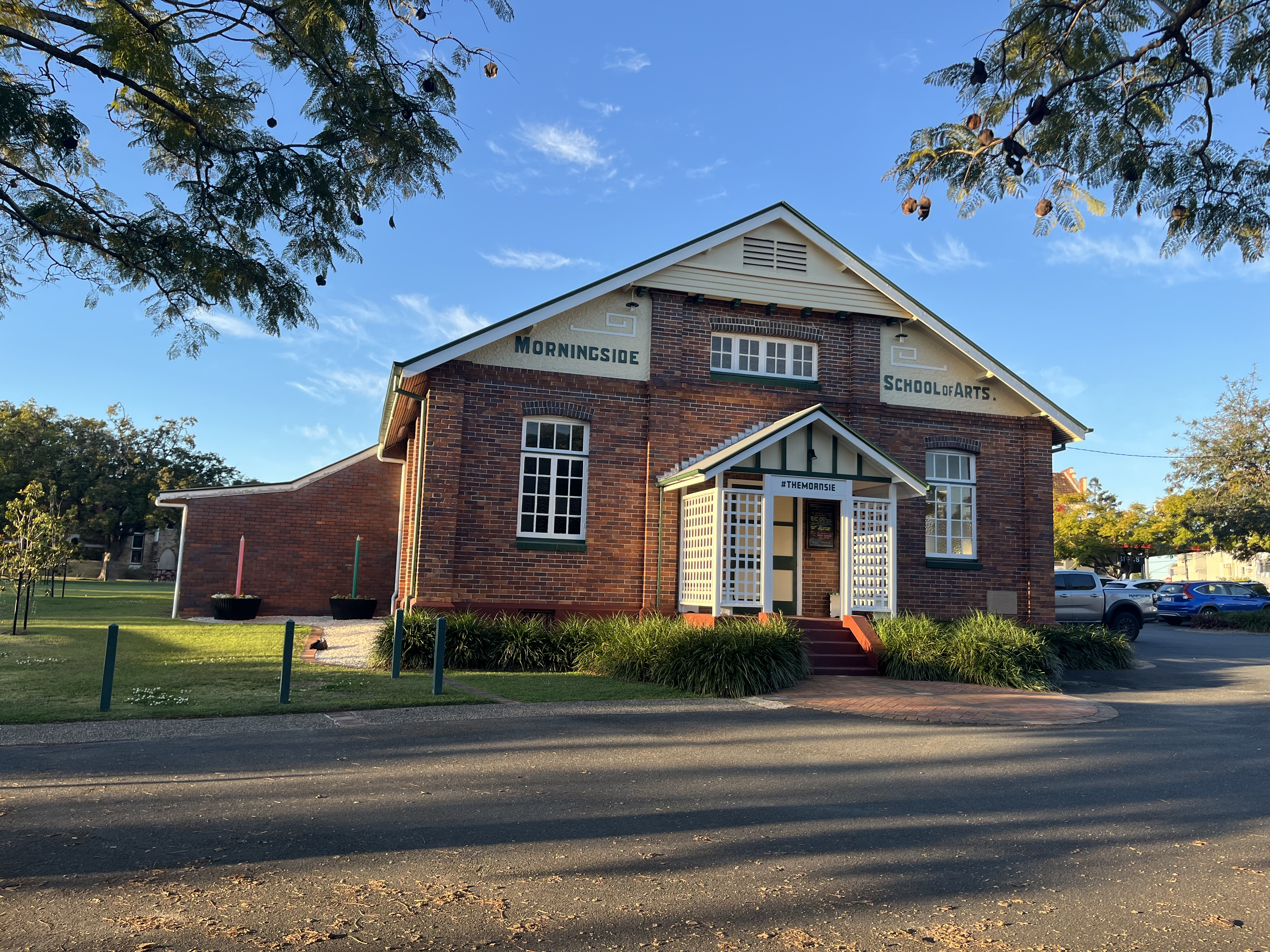
- Morningside School of Arts

- Interactive map of Morningside
- Coordinates: 27.4625°S 153.0747°E
- Country: Australia
- State: Queensland
- City: Brisbane
- LGA: City of Brisbane (Morningside Ward)
- Location: 7.6 km (4.7 mi) E of Brisbane CBD
- Established: 1872

Government
  - State electorate: Bulimba
  - Federal division: Griffith

Area
  - Total: 5.4 km^{2} (2.1 sq mi)

Population
  - Total: 11,755 (2021 census)
  - Density: 2,177/km^{2} (5,640/sq mi)
- Time zone: UTC+10:00 (AEST)
- Postcode: 4170
Suburbs around Morningside
Bulimba	Hamilton	Eagle Farm
Balmoral	Morningside	Murarrie
Hawthorne; Norman Park	Seven Hills	Cannon Hill

Morningside is a southside suburb in the City of Brisbane, Queensland, Australia. In the 2021 census, Morningside had a population of 11,755 people.

== Geography ==
It is located 5 kilometres (3.1 mi) east of the CBD, and borders Cannon Hill, Norman Park, Seven Hills, Balmoral, and Hawthorne.

There are many older-style weatherboard and chamferboard homes in this area as well as modern units and townhouses.

== History ==
Morningside is said to be named after a local estate belonging to David Longlands. The name of the estate itself likely referred either to the Scottish town, or to the estate's location on the eastern side of Brisbane. It is also said to be named for the sight of the morning sun catching the banks of the river.

The area was first settled by Europeans in the early 1870s. The land at that time was used mainly for agriculture; in particular, dairy, sugarcane and tobacco production.

The old suburb of Colmslie was merged into Morningside. At the corner of Bennetts and Wynnum Roads is the historic Bulimba Cemetery (also known as the Balmoral Cemetery) dating from 1875. Morningside started off as a rural area with small dairy and tobacco farms before becoming a popular residential area in the post-war boom.

In December 1884, "The Richmond Park Estate" made up of 145 allotments, was advertised to be auctioned by Hooker, Son & Elliott. A map advertising the auction shows an area bordering Main Cleveland Road, between what is now Wynnum Road and Richmond Road in Morningside. The Bulimba Divisional Board offices and grounds are clearly marked.

In March 1920, the area of land on the hill adjacent to Morningside Station, was offered for sale as the "Morningside Estate", to be auctioned by A.M. Newman. A map of the estate shows the allotments offered for sale. Coronation Park estate Morningside was advertised for sale on 21 July 1923. The estate is centred on the Keralgerie Park in Morningside. Marooba Estate on the corner of Riding Road and Lawson Street was advertised for sale on 25 August 1928, 20 business and residential blocks were auctioned.

Morningside Infants Provisional School opened on 28 May 2023. In 1926, it ceased to be an Infant school and became Morningside State School.

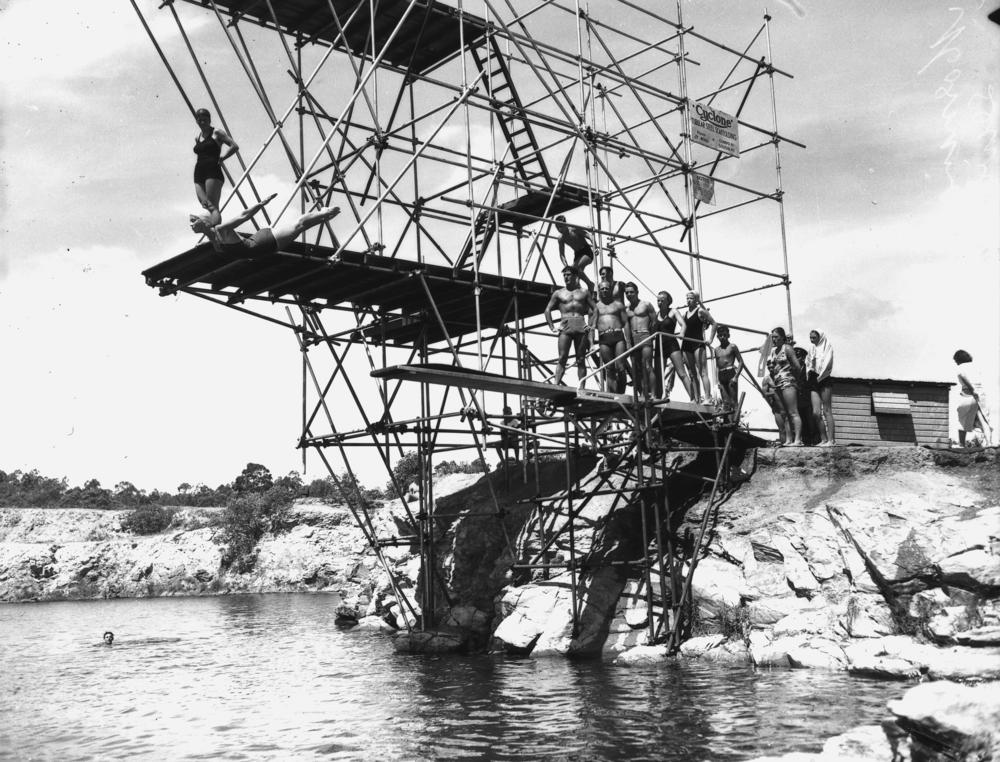
Woman diving into the Morningside Quarry, Brisbane, 1949

A quarry was established post-World War I to obtain bluestone for roads in the growing suburbs. By 1940, the quarry had been filled in to provide a swimming pool for residents. In 1948, the Australian diving championships were held in the quarry swimming pool. After 2 drownings and the detection of typhoid in the water by 1952, the quarry was drained and filled to create Keralgerie Park. The quarry was at 181 Richmond Road (27.4734°S 153.0792°E).

Until 13 April 1969, electric trams skirted the western edge of the suburb, operating along Wynnum Road and Riding Road.

The Cairncross Dockyard was constructed in Morningside between 1942 and 1944. The facility closed in 2014, and as of 2016 was to be redeveloped into a commercial and residential area. In 2022, there was an attempt to have the site listed on the Queensland Heritage Register. In June 2023, the Queensland Heritage Council declined to list the dockyard on the heritage register and the site was then offered for sale.

== Demographics ==
In the 2016 census, Morningside had a population of 10,481 people.

In the 2021 census, Morningside had a population of 11,755 people.

== Education ==
Morningside State School is a government primary (Prep–6) school for boys and girls at 67 Pashen Street (27.4642°S 153.0669°E). In 2017, the school had an enrolment of 454 students with 37 teachers (29 full-time equivalent) and 26 non-teaching staff (15 full-time equivalent). It includes a special education program. The school has 26 classrooms, with a swimming pool, tennis court and a large oval.

In October 2018, a major fire broke out at Morningside State School which caused extensive damage to the school. The school re-opened one week later with the assistance and hard work of the entire school community.

There are no secondary schools in Morningside. The nearest government secondary school is Balmoral State High School at 259 Thynne Road in neighbouring Balmoral.

== Amenities ==
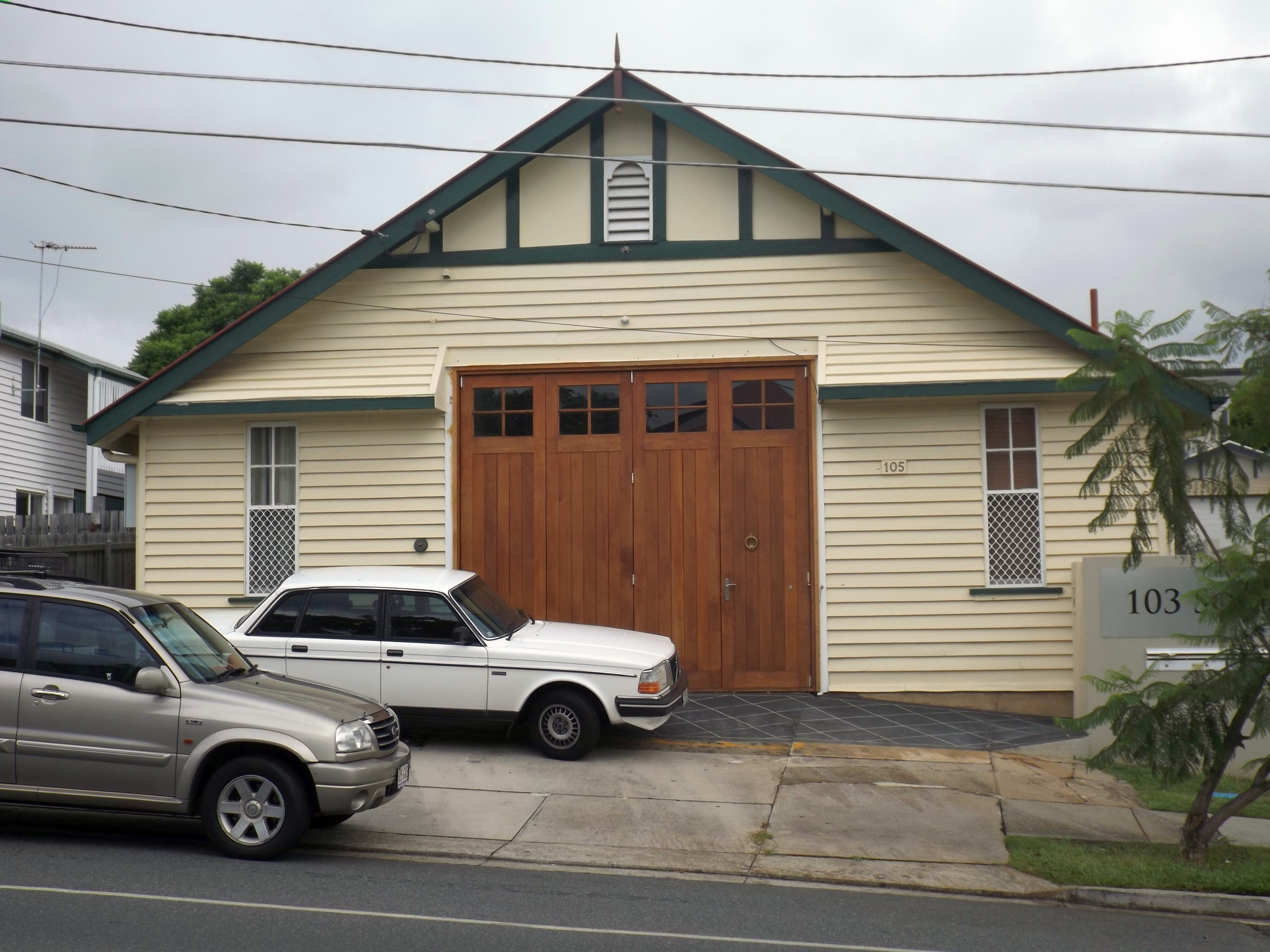
Balmoral Fire Station, 2015

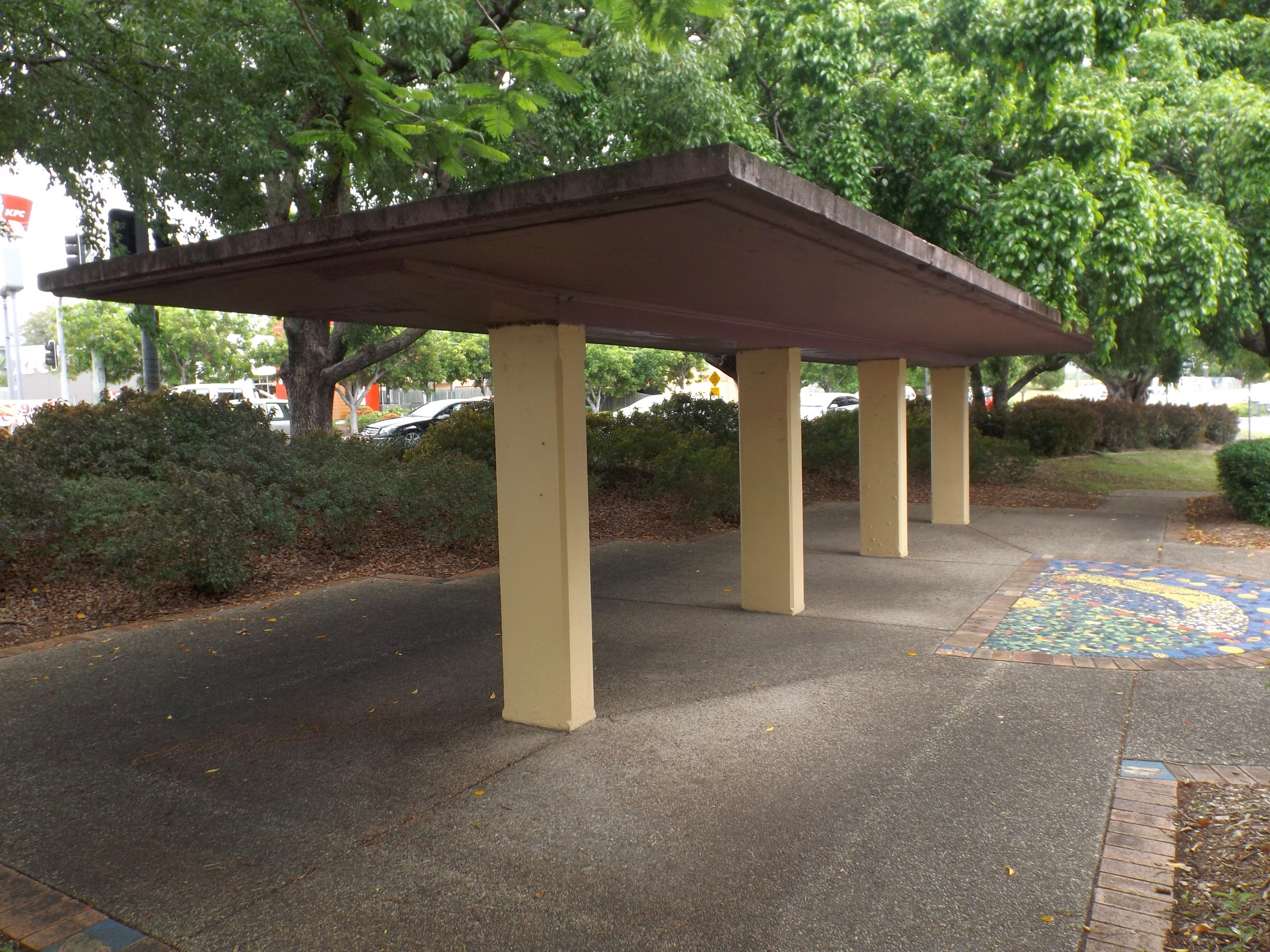
Morningside Air Raid Shelter, 2015

There are two shopping centres in Morningside; Morningside Central, located on the corner of Junction Road and Wynnum Road, and Colmslie Plaza on the opposite side of Junction Road. The Colmslie Hotel is located next to Colmslie Plaza.

The Balmoral Cemetery is located at the corner of Wynnum and Bennetts Road, Morningside. Opened in 1875, this is no longer an active cemetery, but existing graves can be re-used for family members. It is also known as Bulimba Cemetery and Morningside Cemetery and was historically known as Kangaroo Point Cemetery.

== Heritage listings ==
Morningside has three heritage-listed sites:

- 82 Colmslie Road: former Commonwealth Acetate of Lime Factory
- 67 Pashen Street: Morningside State School
- 105 Pashen Street: Balmoral Fire Station
- 580 Wynnum Road: Morningside Air Raid Shelter

== Transport ==
Morningside's main road is Wynnum Road, and Morningside station connects the suburb to the Cleveland railway line.

== Notable residents ==
- Fazerdaze, aka Amelia Murray, a musician from the area who released her first studio album with "Morningside" as the title of the project
- Mal Michael, Australian rules footballer
- Michael and Brett Voss, two brothers who played for the Brisbane Lions and St Kilda Football Club respectively
