= Jack Henry (footballer, born 1922) =

Australian rules footballer

Personal information
- Full name: Jack Donaldson Henry
- Born: 21 January 1922; Geelong, Victoria
- Died: 3 April 2004 (aged 82); Essendon, Victoria
- Original teams: Essendon Stars, Essendon All Blacks
- Height: 168 cm (5 ft 6 in)
- Weight: 67 kg (148 lb)
- Positions: Wingman, rover

Playing career^{1}
Years	Club	Games (Goals)
1944–45	Essendon	4 (1)
- ^{1} Playing statistics correct to the end of 1945.

Jack Donaldson Henry (21 January 1922 – 3 April 2004) was an Australian rules footballer who played with Essendon in the Victorian Football League (VFL). He won two reserves best and fairests, in 1943 and 1944; in the latter season he was also runner-up to Footscray's Dick Wearmouth in the league reserves best and fairest. Henry later played for Williamstown and Ascot Vale before moving to Queensland where he was captain-coach of Morningside.
