= Barry Denny (footballer) =

Australian rules footballer

Personal information
- Full name: Barry Denny
- Born: 10 May 1953 (age 73)
- Original team: Morningside
- Height: 184 cm (6 ft 0 in)
- Weight: 87 kg (192 lb)
- Position: Defender

Playing career^{1}
Years	Club	Games (Goals)
1977–1979	Melbourne	22 (3)
- ^{1} Playing statistics correct to the end of 1979.

Barry Denny (born 10 May 1953) is a former Australian rules footballer who played with Melbourne in the Victorian Football League (VFL) during the 1970s.

Denny, a South Brisbane junior, was a "best and fairest" winner with Morningside in 1972 and 1976. Despite not taking home the "best and fairest" in 1973, he polled well in the Grogan Medal and finished second.

A defender, Denny played just four games for Melbourne in 1977 but was picked more regularly in 1978 when he made 13 appearances. He returned to Morningside after the 1979 season and went on to play a total of 113 QAFL games. Denny also represented Queensland at interstate football on seven occasions.
