= Steven Cummings (footballer) =

Australian rules footballer

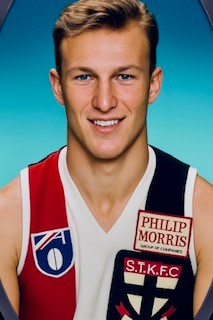

Personal information
- Full name: Steven Cummings
- Born: 16 August 1969 (age 57)
- Original team: Sandringham
- Draft: 9th, 1990 Midyear Draft
- Height: 178 cm (5 ft 10 in)
- Weight: 73 kg (161 lb)

Playing career^{1}
| Years | Club | Games (Goals) |
| 1990–1992 | St Kilda | 14 (0) |
- ^{1} Playing statistics correct to the end of 1992.

Steven Cummings (born 16 August 1969) is a former Australian rules footballer who played with St Kilda in the Australian Football League (AFL).

Cummings started his career at the Keysborough Junior Football Club and also played for Noble Park, but was drafted from Sandringham. He first attracted attention with the Frankston Dolphins in the VFA and was later recruited to St Kilda's under-19 team, where he played alongside future AFL stars like Robert Harvey, Gordon Fode, Brett Bowey, Greg Doyle, Brad Pearce, and cricket legend Shane Warne.

In 1989, changes to St Kilda's senior list limited his senior opportunities, but he played 12 games that season, won the Reserves Best and Fairest, and joined the club's preseason trip to Hawaii. Unfortunately, a fractured ankle in a practice match sidelined him for much of the year. After a brief return with Sandringham, he was drafted at pick 9 in the June draft and debuted in round 20 against Fitzroy, collecting 24 possessions and being named among the best players.

Cummings' best run came in 1991 with nine senior games, but injuries-including a broken leg-cut his season short. He participated in an AFL promotional match in Auckland, after which he was involved in a serious car accident. Persistent injuries, including further broken bones and a severe knee injury in 1993, ultimately led to his delisting by St Kilda.

Despite being told he would not run again, Cummings returned to play in the St Kilda Reserves, winning another Best and Fairest, but his knee injury ended his AFL career. He continued at Frankston in the VFA, where he was named coaches' MVP in 1997 and was a Liston Medal favorite, though he did not win.. He appeared in three seasons for St Kilda.
