= Paul Morwood =

Australian rules footballer, born 1959

Personal information
- Born: 2 March 1959 (age 67)
- Original team: Noble Park (FFL)
- Height: 182 cm (6 ft 0 in)
- Weight: 71 kg (157 lb)

Playing career^{1}
Years	Club	Games (Goals)
1977–1982	South Melbourne/Sydney	85 (61)
1983–1985	St Kilda	60 (14)
1986	Sydney	10 (4)
1987	Collingwood	15 (2)
Total		170 (81)
- ^{1} Playing statistics correct to the end of 1987.

Career highlights
- St Kilda best and fairest - 1985

Paul Morwood (born 2 March 1959) is a former Australian rules footballer in the Victorian Football League (VFL).

== South Melbourne/Sydney ==
Recruited from Noble Park in the Federal Football League, Morwood made his VFL debut with South Melbourne in 1977. His younger brothers Tony and Shane Morwood would also play for South Melbourne in the coming seasons. Morwood's 1982 form was considered "one of the driving forces behind the club's success" that year.

== St Kilda ==
He crossed to St Kilda, debuting in the same match as fellow former Swan Silvio Foschini who had been granted a court ruling in a restraint of trade against South Melbourne. Peter Kiel made way for Morwood. Tony Lockett also made his debut in the same match.

Morwood also won the Saints' best and fairest in 1985.

== Later career ==
After three years with St. Kilda, he moved back to the Swans in 1986 (now based in Sydney) for one year before finishing his career at Collingwood in 1987. He decided to retire at the end of that season due to his outside business interest, which was running a hotel.
