= Balmoral Fire Station =

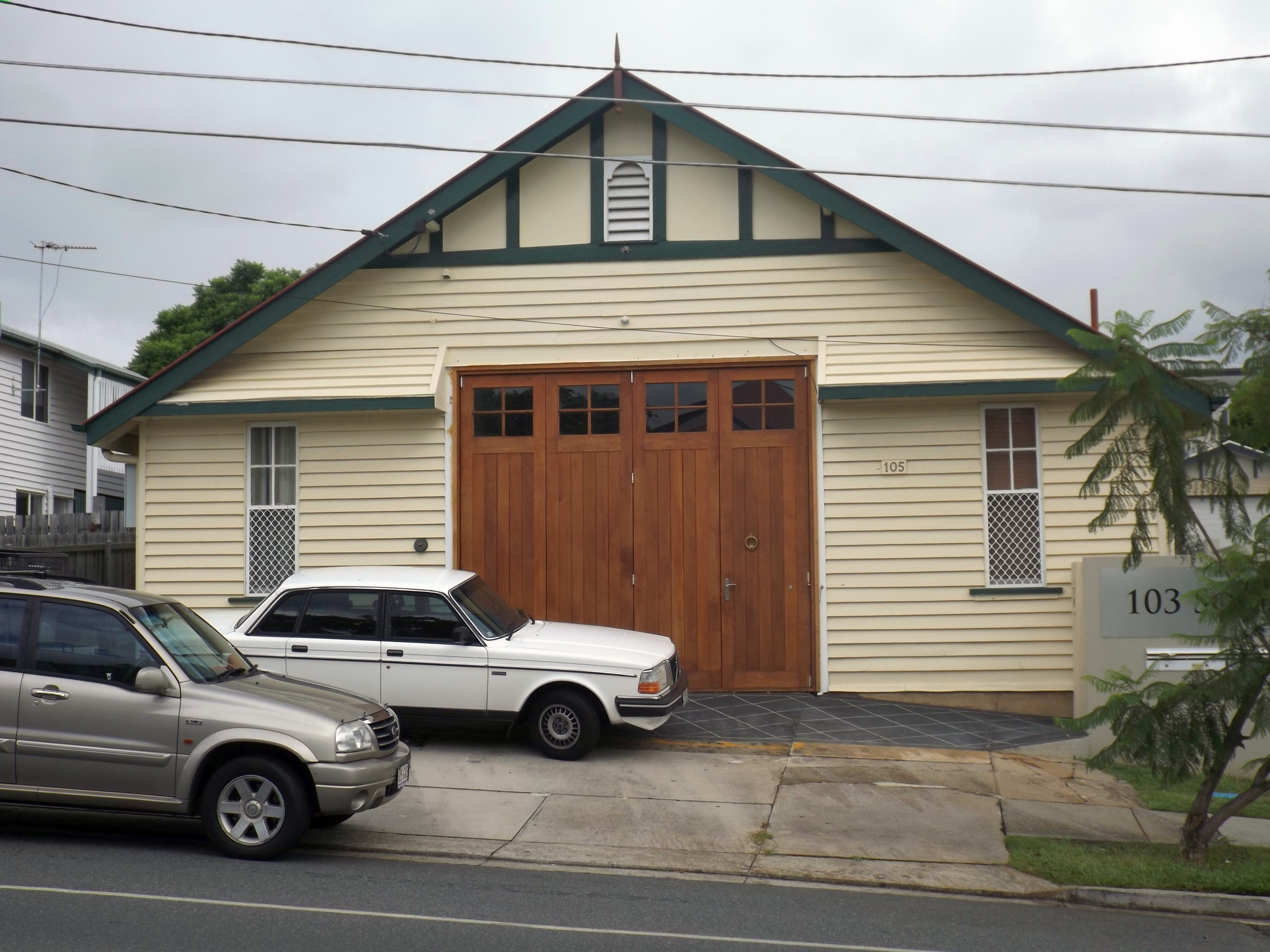
- Residence in 2015

- Location within Queensland Location within Australia
- 27.4647°S 153.069°E
- Location: 105 Pashen Street, Morningside, Queensland, Australia

History
- Design period: 1919–1930s (interwar period)
- Built: c. 1926–1929

Site notes
- Architect: Atkinson and Conrad

Queensland Heritage Register
- Official name: Balmoral Fire Station
- Type: state heritage (built)
- Designated: 26 November 1999
- Reference no.: 601530
- Significant period: 1926–1927, 1929, c. 1942 (fabric)
- Significant components: watch room, recreation area/room/building/hall/centre, driveway, tennis court, shed/s, engine room / appliance bay (fire station), air raid shelter, dormitory
- Builders: C. King

Balmoral Fire Station is a heritage-listed fire station at 105 Pashen Street, Morningside, Queensland, Australia. It was designed by architects Atkinson and Conrad and built from c. 1926 to 1929 by C. King. It was added to the Queensland Heritage Register on 26 November 1999.

== History ==
Balmoral's iconic timber fire station, designed by Atkinson and Conrad, was opened on 15 March 1927.

Between 1860 and 1868 there were five attempts to form a fire fighting service for Brisbane. Each brigade struggled to survive unable to attract a viable subscription base and hampered by inadequate equipment and an unreliable water supply. The establishment of an effective fire service did not enjoy a high priority among civic and government leaders.

A fifth brigade, the City Volunteer Fire Brigade, was established in 1868 under rules which provided for better financial control and management through the Fire Brigade Board. These arrangements were consolidated by the Fire Brigades Act 1881 under which it was established that the Brigade was to be funded for fire services from contributions by the Queensland State Government, Brisbane Municipal Council, insurance companies and subscriptions. In 1889 the first full-time firemen were employed and a permanent fire brigade was established. A new headquarters, designed by H. W. Atkinson, was completed on the corner of Ann and Edwards Streets (on a corner of the Normal School site) in 1890. This began a long association between the Fire Brigade and the various architectural firms with whom he was associated.

The fire fighting needs of the city increased as Brisbane continued to develop. A number of fire brigades were formed early after the Fire Brigades Act Amendment Act 1902 allowed local authorities to establish boards and brigades. Those formed were voluntary bodies with only the superintendent and immediate assistants receiving a salary. The Fire Brigades Act 1920 rationalised the network of fire brigades in Brisbane and suburbs, centralising control under the Metropolitan Fire Brigades Board in 1921.

The idea of constructing a fire station in Balmoral was first mooted in the early 1920s when a residents group approached the Chief Officer of the Fire Brigade, Hinton, to inquire about the cost of erecting and fitting a station. The proposal was initially rejected as being too expensive, however the growth of the suburb eventually made it a necessity. A block of land extending from Pashen Street to Stephens Street was acquired for the use of the fire station, where the existing house and outbuildings were utilised as a temporary station from 30 June 1925 until March 1927 when the purpose-built station was opened.

Plans and specifications for the new timber fire station were completed on 12 November 1926 by Atkinson and Conrad. Tenders were called on 10 November 1926, and the tender of W.B. Linsay of £850 was accepted. The design of the building incorporated a central engine room with a three feet, six inch deep pit and a ramp leading to it from the street. A watch room, dormitory, workshop. kitchen, recreation room and bathroom were provided. The building had concrete foundations up to the brick piers. The specification called for called for a six-inch thick concrete foundation wall in the engine room and a five-inch thick floor. The external walls and gables were to be sheeted with hardwood weather boards and all floors, except the engine room, were wrought and tongue and groove pine (T and G). The roof was galvanised iron. A timber earth closet building, with a galvanised iron roof was erected at the rear of the station.

The official opening of the Balmoral Fire Station was conducted by Albert Wright, MLA and member of the Fire Brigade Board on 15 March 1927. A number of local residents and members of the Fire Brigade attended the opening. The description of the building at this time was "neat, built of wood with a concrete base, 42 feet long and 37 feet wide". The final cost of construction was £900. Two permanent and four auxiliary staff were attached to the station.

Additions were made to the fire station in 1929 to the design of architect S.W. Prior. The tender of C. King was accepted.

A brick air raid shelter was constructed to the rear of the fire station during World War II. The Japanese attack on Pearl Harbor in December 1941 stunned the Australian populous, and in the weeks and months which followed fear of air raids and invasion dominated Australian society. On Christmas Eve, 1941, instructions were issued in each State by the State Emergency Committee for government, private employers and private households to immediately commence with the building of shelters. In Brisbane, three distinct categories of surface shelters were constructed: pill box, cantilever and special/site specific. Most of the shelters surviving today are of cantilever construction as these were purposely designed and located for conversion to public waiting sheds and shade structures after the war. The air raid shelter at the Balmoral Fire Station is of the pill box form, constructed by the State Government for the use of the firemen manning the Station. It was built to shelter approximately six adults.

A tennis court was constructed on the property, and was the site of some of the local Fireman's Recreation Club activities.

In 2002, it was decided that the building was too out-of-date for the needs of the fire service and a new location for a modern fire station was sought. The old fire station was sold and converted into a residence. It changed hands in April 2014 for $615,000. The air raid shelter still forms part of the property.

== Description ==
The Balmoral Fire station is located at Pashen Street, Balmoral. The site is composed of the main fire station building, a grassed hose drying area, an old bomb shelter and clay base tennis court.

The station building is a single storey timber-framed building approximately 12 metres (39 ft) long x 11 metres (36 ft) wide. Constructed on concrete foundations and brick piers, the structure has a symmetrical appearance from the street with a simple gable roof extending the length of the building. The exterior walls are clad with timber weatherboards while the roof is sheeted with galvanised iron. Aluminium louvre shades have more recently been fitted to western windows.

The interior space is structured around a central engine room which basically gives rise to the building's form. This space creates the spine of the building and has direct access to Pashen street via a large automated, panel lift door. Set either side of the engine room are ancillary spaces including a watch room, dormitory, officer's room (formerly a workshop), kitchen, recreation room and toilet and shower facilities. These ancillary spaces are lined with tongue and groove boarding. Similarly, the floors are also said to be tongue and groove, pine floor boards however, more recent floor coverings now conceal the nature of the original floor. The central engine room is set approximately 200 millimetres (7.9 in) below the floor level of side ancillary spaces, and access into these spaces is via small concrete steps located outside each doorway. Built into the steps are a series of drainage pipes which allow the central area to drain freely. At the rear of the central engine room a small locker room has been constructed.

The area between the station and the front boundary is fully concreted. This hard stand area serves not only as the engine driveway into the station but also as a space for a couple of cars to park. Running around the perimeter of the station are a series of concrete paths and stormwater drains. Located to the west of the station building is a grassed area which is used for hose drying. This space is bounded by a simple concrete and steel fence to the Pashen Street boundary.

Constructed to the rear of the station building on the eastern side of the site is a brick walled and concrete roofed air raid shelter of the "pill box" type. Apart from a more recent window which has been cut into one of the walls the structure is very intact and is now used as a storage space. Also located at the rear of the site on a higher level than the station building is a clay base tennis court. The original retaining walls to the court have been replaced by a system of interlocking landscape blocks which have been planted out with strawberry creepers. The court is surrounded by a combination of chain wire fencing and timber battens both set on a main timber frame. Located on the eastern side of the tennis court is a small timber framed and battened shelter shed. Generally the grounds are very well maintained.

== Heritage listing ==
Balmoral Fire Station was listed on the Queensland Heritage Register on 26 November 1999 having satisfied the following criteria.

The place is important in demonstrating the evolution or pattern of Queensland's history.

The Balmoral Fire Station is important in demonstrating the growth and development of the Balmoral area during the 1920s. The air raid shelter constructed to the rear of the station during World War II demonstrates Australia's involvement in that conflict, and is testimony to the fear of attack and invasion by enemy forces following the attack on Pearl Harbor in December 1941 and the subsequent sweep of Japanese forces through Asia and into south-east Asia and the Pacific.

The place demonstrates rare, uncommon or endangered aspects of Queensland's cultural heritage.

The Balmoral Fire Station demonstrates a rare aspect of Queensland's cultural heritage as one of the only 1920s fire stations still in operation in Brisbane. Both the exterior and interior of the building are substantially intact. The air raid shelter to the rear of the station is rare as one of few surviving structures built in Brisbane during the war for war-time purposes. War memorials and commemorated public facilities, such as community halls and swimming pools, are dedicated after the event of war – air raid shelters are one of the few types of contemporary war-era structures surviving in Brisbane. While war memorials and commemorated public facilities such as community halls and swimming pools were constructed in the years following the war, air raid shelters are one of the few remaining structures built during the war for war-time purposes. The air raid shelter is also a rare example of a Queensland Government-built air raid shelter.

The place is important in demonstrating the principal characteristics of a particular class of cultural places.

The Balmoral Fire Station demonstrates the principal characteristics of an early twentieth century suburban fire station.

The place is important because of its aesthetic significance.

The Balmoral Fire Station has aesthetic and architectural significance as a modest, functional civic building, sympathetic to its residential surroundings.

The place has a special association with the life or work of a particular person, group or organisation of importance in Queensland's history.

The Balmoral Fire Station is important for its association with the work of the architectural firm Atkinson and Conrad. Atkinson, through the firms he was associated with, sustained a long association with the Fire Services in Brisbane commencing in 1890 with his design for the new headquarters for the Brisbane Fire Brigade. His architectural practices were responsible for many of the fire stations throughout Brisbane.
