= Tony Smith (footballer, born 1966) =

Australian rules footballer

Personal information
- Born: 1 August 1966 (age 60)
- Original team: Morningside (QAFL)
- Height: 199 cm (6 ft 6 in)
- Weight: 100 kg (220 lb)
- Position: Ruckman

Playing career^{1}
Years	Club	Games (Goals)
1986–1988	Sydney	17 (1)
- ^{1} Playing statistics correct to the end of 1988.

Tony Smith (born 1 August 1966) is a former Australian rules footballer who played with Sydney Swans in the Victorian Football League (VFL).

Smith spent his early years in the southern Riverina town of Finley (NSW) before moving to Queensland with his family at age 11. He only played a few games for Morningside in the Queensland Australian Football League (QAFL) in 1985 before he was approached by the Swans. He had just joined the Queensland Police Force but on the encouragement of his father, who had been a South Melbourne supporter, decided to make the move to Sydney. A ruckman, Smith made his senior debut against Melbourne in round 17 of the 1986 season. Smith only played a total of 17 games in three seasons. Due to business commitments, he left the Swans at the end of the 1988 season, to captain-coach Sydney club North Shore.

After retiring from football, Smith became a successful property developer and promoted the schoolies week on the Gold Coast. In January 2015 he was charged with retaliation against a witness, attempting to pervert the course of justice and attempted fraud.
