= Merv Dihm =

Australian rules footballer

Personal information
- Full name: Mervyn Dihm
- Born: 16 September 1933 (age 93)
- Original team: MHS/South Sydney
- Height: 185 cm (6 ft 1 in)
- Weight: 78 kg (172 lb)

Playing career^{1}
Years	Club	Games (Goals)
1955	St Kilda	8 (0)
- ^{1} Playing statistics correct to the end of 1955.

Mervyn "Merv" Dihm (born 16 September 1933) is a former Australian rules footballer who played with St Kilda in the Victorian Football League (VFL).

While serving at naval air station HMAS Albatross as a naval rating in 1953, Dihm was arrested and charged with assault. It was alleged that he assaulted a navy personnel's wife with a block of wood, after breaking into her room. He pleaded guilty and argued that he had been under the influence of benzedrine and couldn't remember the incident. The court found him guilty and he served a short jail sentence.

Dihm played just eight games for St Kilda, all in the 1955 VFL season, but made a name for himself in Queensland football. He was the joint winner of the 1960 Grogan Medal, while playing with Morningside.
