= Rick Norman =

Australian rules footballer

Personal information
- Full name: Rick Norman
- Born: 25 July 1963 (age 63)
- Original team: Noble Park
- Height: 186 cm (6 ft 1 in)
- Weight: 85 kg (187 lb)

Playing career^{1}
Years	Club	Games (Goals)
1985–1986	North Melbourne	12 (10)
1987	Brisbane Bears	1 (0)
Total		13 (10)
- ^{1} Playing statistics correct to the end of 1987.

Rick Norman (born 25 July 1963) is a former Australian rules footballer who played with North Melbourne and the Brisbane Bears in the Victorian Football League (VFL).

A former Noble Park player, Norman made his league debut against Collingwood in the opening round of the 1985 VFL season. It was a historic occasion as it was the very first time Friday Night Football was played in the VFL. He had just one disposal, having injured his hamstring, and didn't play seniors for the rest of the year.

Norman played 11 games in 1986 and the following season joined the Brisbane Bears, who were making their first ever appearance in the VFL. He played just one game for the Bears, a round four fixture against Fitzroy at Carrara.

He also played football for Morningside in Queensland.
