= Mark Bayes =

Australian rules footballer

Personal information
- Full name: Mark Bayes
- Born: 15 March 1967 (age 59)
- Original team: Noble Park
- Height: 190 cm (6 ft 3 in)
- Weight: 94 kg (207 lb)

Playing career^{1}
Years	Club	Games (Goals)
1985–1998	Sydney Swans	246 (174)
- ^{1} Playing statistics correct to the end of 1998.

Career highlights
- Bob Skilton Medalist - 1989; Sydney Swans Team of the Century; 1x VFL Team of Year: 1989

Mark Bayes (born 15 March 1967) is a former Australian rules footballer who played for the Sydney Swans in the Victorian/Australian Football League.

Originally from Noble Park, Bayes played 246 games and kicked 174 goals for the Swans. He was named on the interchange bench in the Sydney Swan's official 'Team of the Century,' and in 1989 was voted Sydney's best and fairest player.

Bayes usually played in defence but was capable of going forward and had an accurate left foot kick. He played in the 1996 AFL Grand Final.
