= Noble Park Football Club =

Names
- Nickname(s): The Bulls

2025 season
- Home-and-away season: 6th
- Leading goalkicker: Josh Stern (32 goals)
- Best and fairest: Jackson Sketcher

Club details
- Founded: 1918
- Colours: Royal Blue Gold
- Competition: Eastern Football League
- President: Grant Connelly
- Coach: Steve Hughes
- Captain(s): Ben Marson
- Premierships: Dandenong District Association: 1935, 1941, 1944, 1945, 1947, 1951, 1952, 1953. Caulfield Oakleigh District League: 1961, 1962. Federal Football League: 1972. (Reserves: 1970, 1972. Under 18s: 1976, 1977, 1979, 1980, 1981). South East Suburban Football League: 1983, 1985, 1986, 1987, 1990, 1992. (Reserves: 1986, 1987, 1988, 1989, 1990, 1991, 1992. Under 18s: 1982, 1983, 1984, 1989, 1990, 1991, 1992). Southern Football League: 1994, 1996, 1997. (Reserves: 1993, 1994, 1995, 1996, 1997, 1998, 1999. Under 18's: 1994, 1995). Eastern Football League: 2003, 2004, 2010, 2011, 2022. (Reserves: 2004. Under 19s: 2016, 2018).
- Ground(s): Pat Wright Senior Ground

Uniforms
Home	Away

Other information
- Official website: Noble Park Football Club

The Noble Park Football Club is an Australian rules football club that fields teams in both the seniors and juniors of the Eastern Football League (EFL) in Melbourne. The club is considered one of Victoria's most successful breeding grounds for VFL/AFL players.

Due to the club's rich history of Premierships and its contribution to the sport and the community, in 2005, Noble Park was recognised as the only sporting club named by the City of Greater Dandenong, among its 14 sporting heroes' commemorative display.

== History ==
Noble Park was formed in 1918 and played in the Under 21 competition in the Berwick Association until the end of 1933. The club jumper was black with a yellow sash. From 1934 until 1958, Noble Park played in the Dandenong District Association, winning eight premierships.

In 1959 Noble Park merged with the Harrisfield Football Club and became known as Noble Park-Harrisfield Football Club. The club also changed its jumper to royal blue and white vertical stripes.

In 1961, the club adopted the yellow from the original Noble Park jumper and the blue from the Harrisfield jumper to create the blue and gold vertical striped jumper which was worn for most of their existence. Once again the club was known as the Noble Park Football Club. This was also the year that they joined the Caulfield Oakleigh District League where they won two premierships before joining the Federal Football League in 1964.

In the Federal league, Noble Park won two reserves premierships, five under 18 premierships and one senior premiership between 1964 and 1981.

In 1982, Noble Park joined the South East Suburban Football League winning seven under 18 premierships, seven reserves premierships and six senior premierships before the league merged with the Eastern Suburbs Churches Football Association, creating the Southern Football League in 1993.

In the newly formed SFL, Noble Park won two under 18 premierships, seven reserves premierships and three senior premierships.

At the turn of the millennium, Noble Park transferred to the much stronger Eastern Football League, where they became known as the Bulls and changed their jumper to its current design. The Bulls would have to wait until 2003 to win their first EFL premiership, but would not have to wait as long for their second, as the club went back to back, winning the 2004 premiership. The Bulls reserves team also won a premiership in 2004.

In 2010 and 2011, Noble Park went back to back, winning their third and fourth EFL premierships since joining the league in 2000. In 2013 Noble Park made a surprising entrance into the Grand Final where they lost by a significant margin.

== Notable former players ==
Name	VFL/AFL Club	VFL/AFL Games	Major Football Achievement
Glenn Archer	North Melbourne	311	1996 Norm Smith Medal, 1996 & 1999 Premiership Player, North Melbourne Team of the Century, 1996, 1998 and 2002 All-Australian Team
Stephen Milne	St Kilda	275	Record for most goals kicked at Docklands Stadium, 2002, 2010, 2011 & 2012 St Kilda leading goalkicker
Adam Treloar	Greater Western Sydney, Collingwood, Western Bulldogs	258*	2024 All-Australian Team, 2016-2017 and 2019 All-Australian Squad
Mark Bayes	Sydney	246	Named in Sydney Swans Team of the Century, 1989 Bob Skilton Medal
Tony Morwood	South Melbourne/Sydney	229	Named in South Melb/Sydney's Team of the Century, 1979 & 1982 South Melb/Sydney's leading goalkicker
Tim McGrath	North Melbourne, Geelong	226	1992, 1994 & 1995 Grand Final Team, 1998 State of Origin Team
Shane Morwood	South Melbourne/Sydney, Collingwood	212	1990 Collingwood Premiership Player, 1989 & 1990 State of Origin Team
Brian Mynott	St Kilda	210	1966 Premiership Player
Sam Gilbert	St Kilda	208	2009 All-Australian Squad
Steven Icke	North Melbourne, Melbourne	198	1977 Premiership Player, 1982 Melbourne best and fairest, 1983 & 1984 State of Origin Team
Paul Morwood	South Melbourne/Sydney, St Kilda, Collingwood	170	1985 St Kilda best and fairest
Jim O'Dea	St Kilda	167	
Shane Savage	Hawthorn, St Kilda	165	2011 AFL Rising Star nominee
Brad Crouch	Adelaide, St Kilda	161	2019 Adelaide Best and Fairest
James Gwilt	St Kilda, Essendon	152	2010 Grand Final team
Bill "Polly" Perkins (Dec.)	Richmond	148	1943 Richmond Premiership Player
Darren Millane (Dec.)	Collingwood	147	1990 Premiership Player, 1990 Leigh Matthews Trophy, Collingwood Team of the Century( wing)
Adam Ramanauskas	Essendon	134	2000 Premiership Player, 2001 International Rules Series
Tory Dickson	Western Bulldogs	114	2016 Premiership Player
Kris Barlow	Hawthorn	102	2012 EFL Premiership Coach
Darren Bennett	West Coast Eagles & Melbourne	78	1989 & 1990 Melbourne leading goalkicker
Barry Beecroft	South Melbourne	71	1977 VFL Premiership Player, 1981 WAFL Premiership Player
Max Cole	Fitzroy	52	
Denis McGrath	North Melbourne	36	
John Blair	South Melbourne, Fitzroy, St Kilda	33	1982 Grogan Medal
David Gallagher	Adelaide, Carlton	33	
Glen Parker	South Melbourne	32	1970 Michelsen Medal
Kevin Shinners	Richmond	23	
Wayne Lamb	Melbourne, Fitzroy	21	
Frank Deayton (Dec.)	Melbourne	17	
Beau Dowler	Hawthorn	16	U/18 All-Australian, TAC Cup Team of the Year
John Georgiou	St Kilda	16	Greek Team of the Century, 1999 J.J. Liston Trophy
Craig Jacotine	Collingwood	16	2010 & 2011 EFL Premiership Player
Robert Bell (Dec.)	South Melbourne	15	
Shane Valenti	Melbourne	15	2010 & 2011 J.J Liston Trophy
Steven Cummings	St Kilda	14	
Rick Norman	North Melbourne, Brisbane Bears	13	
Robert Bell	South Melbourne	13	
Patrick Foy	Sydney	7	
Brent Williams	Adelaide	7	1998 West Adelaide Leading goal kicker, U/17 All-Australian
Kyle Martin	Collingwood	6	2013 & 2014 Joseph Wren Memorial Trophy, 2012 Frankston (VFL) Best and Fairest
Ray Jamieson	South Melbourne	5	
Bill Norman	Hawthorn	5	
Peter Weidemann	Collingwood	5	
Michael Plant	South Melbourne	4	
Ben Robertson	Carlton	3	
Will Sangster	Sydney	2	
Bill Smith	Fitzroy	2	
Alex Woodward	Hawthorn	2	2014 J.J. Liston Trophy
Daniel Donati	Richmond	1	1999 Norm Goss Memorial Medal
Peter Maloni	Sydney	1	
Duncan McGregor	South Melbourne	1	
Doug Ensor	Nil	N/A	Guinness World Record for most goals in a game (60)
Damien Fleming	Nil	N/A	Played 20 test matches & 88 ODI matches for Australia
