= Morningside State School =

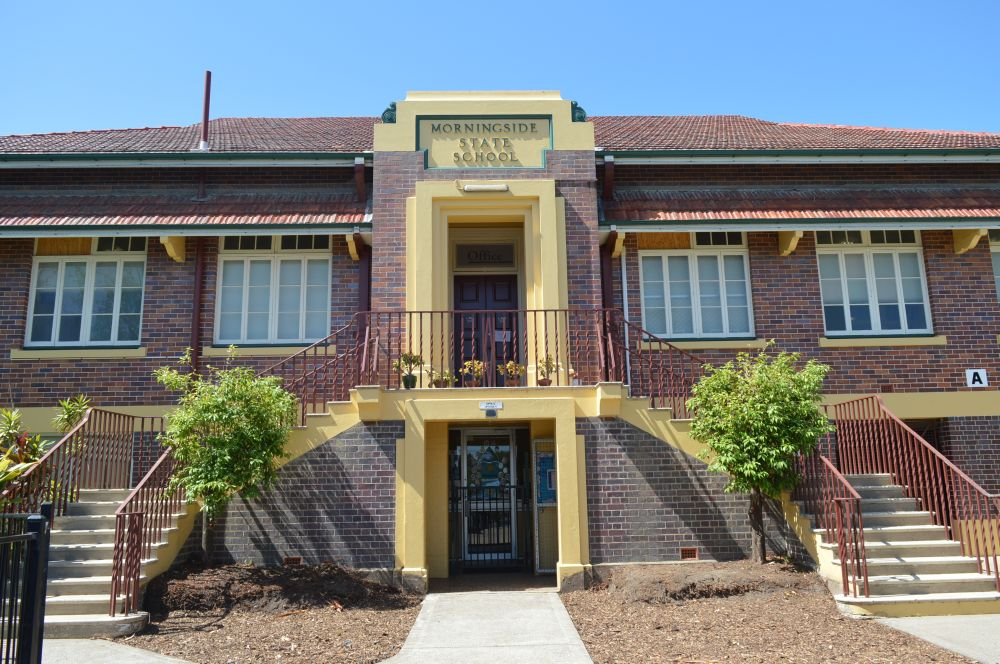
- Infants School Building (Block A), 2018

- Location within Queensland
- 27.4644°S 153.0659°E
- Location: 67 Pashen Street, Morningside, City of Brisbane, Queensland, Australia

History
- Design period: 1919–1930s (Interwar period)
- Built: 1925–1926, 1927–1954, 1927–1958, 1930, 1937, 1956–1957, 1956

Site notes
- Architectural style: Art Deco

Queensland Heritage Register
- Official name: Morningside State School
- Type: state heritage
- Designated: 24 April 2018
- Reference no.: 650057
- Type: Education, research, scientific facility: School-state
- Theme: Creating social and cultural institutions: Commemorating significant events; Educating Queenslanders: Providing primary schooling

Morningside State School is a heritage-listed state school at 67 Pashen Street, Morningside, City of Brisbane, Queensland, Australia. It was built from 1925 to 1926. It was added to the Queensland Heritage Register on 24 April 2018.

== History ==
Morningside State School opened in 1926, on its current site at 67 Pashen Street, Morningside, about 3.8 km (2.4 mi) northeast of the Brisbane CBD. The school is important in demonstrating the evolution of state education and its associated architecture. It retains:

- four connected sectional school buildings
  - Block C, 1926
  - Blocks B, 1927, extended 1958
  - Blocks D, 1927, extended c. 1954
  - Block L, 1930
- a Depression-era brick infants school building (Block A, 1937)
- two connected highset timber school buildings
  - Block E, 1956
  - Block F, 1956, extended 1957

set in landscaped grounds, with:

- a poured-concrete retaining wall (1939) to Pashen Street
- tennis courts (1939)
- a WWII memorial to The Rats of Tobruk

The school has a strong and ongoing association with the Morningside community.

Traditional country of the Jagera and Turrbal peoples, the suburb of Morningside was once within the area of the local government areas of Bulimba Division, and later the Shire of Balmoral, before being absorbed into Greater Brisbane in 1925. Farming, dairying and related industries initially occurred in the district. The school site was part of a farm surveyed in 1857 and subdivided into residential allotments in 1863. Residential development in Morningside was facilitated by two transport improvements in particular:

- the opening of the Cleveland railway line from South Brisbane to Cleveland in 1889
- the extension of the electric tram line (from just east of Norman Creek) to Barton Road, Hawthorne, by May 1925

Local population growth (from 495 in 1911, to 1806 in 1921), prior to the tram line extension, led to pressure for a school at Morningside in the early 1920s. The establishment of schools was considered an essential step in the development of new communities and integral to their success. Schools became a community focus, a symbol of progress, and a source of pride, with enduring connections formed with past pupils, parents, and teachers.

In July 1922 a committee visited the Minister for Education, John Saunders Huxham, to ask for an infants school, given that children were walking long distances to existing schools such as Cannon Hill State School (est.1915), Norman Park State School (1900) and Bulimba State School (1866). A shortage of government funds meant that the Morningside masonic hall (actually a converted residence) on Agnes Street had to be rented as an interim measure, and the Morningside Provisional (Infants) School No.1803 opened there on 28 May 1923.

By this time, a site for a state school for Morningside on Pashen Street had been chosen, and the community continued to push for the construction of a school. The nine allotments which made up the original school grounds (consisting of 2 acres (0.81 ha)) between Pashen Street and Stephen Street, west of Howard Street, were obtained by the Secretary for Public Instruction in December 1924. (In 2018 the westernmost allotment of the original school grounds on Pashen Street (subdivision 113) is the site of the western half of Block M, and the east end of the swimming pool.)

In July 1925, the Department of Public Works was asked to prepare a plan and estimate costs for a school building (Block C in 2018) to accommodate 200 pupils. The new building was a sectional school type. Attention to improving light and ventilation to achieve an optimum classroom culminated in 1920 with the sectional school type, which proved very successful and was used unaltered until 1950. The sectional school type had only one verandah, typically on the north side, allowing the southern wall, with a maximum number of windows for natural light, to be unobstructed. The building was designed so that the blank western wall was removable. As the school grew, the western end wall could be detached and the building extended in sections (although no western extensions occurred to Morningside State School's sectional school buildings). This led to the construction of long narrow buildings of many classrooms - a distinctive feature of Queensland schools.

The construction of the new school was announced in October 1925, and its cost by the end of June 1926 was £3163. The infants school vacated the masonic hall shortly before the Morningside State School opened on 16 August 1926.

There was immediately a need for additional accommodation at Morningside State School, which, although designed for 200 pupils, opened with an attendance of 350; rising to 475 by October 1926. As an interim measure, 200 students were taught at the Morningside School of Arts hall in 1927. Two new wings at Morningside State School, also sectional school buildings, were built by December 1927, east of Block C, at a cost of £4600: Block B (north wing) and Block D (south wing). They were officially opened on Saturday 25 February 1928. By this time, the school enrolment was 600, with the school's three buildings only designed for 440.

The three teaching buildings were of similar construction: each was a highset timber-framed and -clad building with a Dutch-gable roof, and 8-foot (2.4 m) verandahs to the north, west and east sides. Block C also had two gabled teachers rooms, each 15 by 12 feet (4.6 by 3.7 m), off its north verandah. All three buildings were higher set at their west ends, due to the slope of the ground. Classrooms (five in Block C, and three in each of Blocks B and D) were all 21 by 18 feet (6.4 by 5.5 m), and were designed for 40 children, with double doors linking the classrooms. Each classroom had casement windows on the south side, blackboards to the west, double-hung windows and a double door to the front verandah, and a square vent in their coved ceilings. Block C originally had hatrooms in its northern verandah corners; whereas Block B had hatrooms in each verandah corner apart from the southwest, where the west verandah was linked to the north verandah of Block C. Block D had hatrooms at the southern ends of its east and west verandahs, and plans showed it was originally set at a higher elevation than the other two blocks, with steps from its north verandah leading down to the east verandah of Block C.

Efforts to improve the school's facilities continued. Three 35-perch (890 m^{2}) allotments on Pashen Street (in 2018 the site of the swimming pool and tennis courts) were purchased in 1928–9. In late 1929, a fete was held to raise funds to beautify the grounds with shade trees, and plans were drawn up for another sectional school building, this time of two storeys, to the west of Block C. The tender of W Alford was accepted in May 1930 for £1111.

The Department of Public Works noted:

"Owing to the rapid growth of the Morningside district [Morningside's population rose from 1806 in 1921, to 4919 by 1947] it became necessary to make a second addition to this school, and on account of the fall in the ground a two storied [sic] building was found to be more suitable and economical. The addition will comprise two classrooms on each floor, in size 21ft by 18ft [6.4m x 5.5m], erected on concrete piers joined to the existing building [Block C] and having verandahs 8ft [2.4m] wide on the north, east and west sides. Accommodation for 160 more pupils will be provided".

The new building was opened on 25 October 1930, at the annual school fund-raising fete, by the then Minister for Public Instruction, Reginald King.

In the early 1930s, land was added to the east side of the school, when an unformed section of Howard Street, plus two allotments which were the site of a council quarry (the latter consisting of about 75.25 perches (1,903 m^{2}) were obtained by the Secretary for Public Instruction.

This new land became the site of the next addition to the Morningside State School, a Depression-era brick infants school building (Block A). Infants schools were constructed in Queensland from 1891. In the 1930s, infants schools were sometimes built using brick, as smaller varieties within the Depression-era brick schools type, which were commonly larger and not for infants. In addition to this one at Morningaise, brick infants schools were also built at Windsor State School and Yeronga State School.

The Great Depression, commencing in 1929 and extending well into the 1930s, brought private building work to a standstill. However, with rising unemployment, the Queensland Government decided to provide relief work for unemployed Queenslanders and embarked on an ambitious and important building program to provide impetus to the economy.

Even before the October 1929 stock market crash, the Queensland Government initiated an Unemployment Relief Scheme, through a work program administered by the Department of Public Works (DPW). This included painting and repairs to school buildings. By mid-1930, men were undertaking grounds improvement works to schools under the scheme. Extensive funding was given for improvements to school grounds, including fencing and levelling ground for play areas, involving terracing and retaining walls. At Morningside State School, relief workers built two grassed basketball courts (later the site of the swimming pool), and some of the school's retaining walls.

In June 1932, the Forgan Smith Labor Government came to power from a campaign that advocated increased government spending to counter the effects of the Depression. The government embarked on a large public building program designed to promote the employment of local skilled workers, and the purchase of local building materials. The construction of substantial brick school buildings in prosperous or growing suburban areas and regional centres during the 1930s provided tangible proof of the government's commitment to remedy the unemployment situation.

Depression-era brick school buildings form a recognisable and important type. Most were designed in a classical idiom to project the sense of stability and optimism which the government sought to convey. Frequently, they were two storeys above an open understorey and built to accommodate up to 1000 students. They adopted a symmetrical plan form and often exhibited a prominent central entry. Classrooms were commonly divided by folding timber partitions and the understorey was used as covered play space, storage, ablutions and other functions.

Despite their similarities, each Depression-era brick school building was individually designed by a DPW architect, which resulted in a wide range of styles and ornamental features being utilised within the overall set.

Block A at Morningside State School was red face brick, and had a tiled Dutch-gable roof. The understorey had lavatories, a store room, and an open play area. The first floor accommodated: two teachers rooms, both 21 by 12 feet (6.4 by 3.7 m); two 50-pupil classrooms, both 22 by 21 feet (6.7 by 6.4 m); and three 40-pupil classrooms, divided by folding partitions (two were 21 by 18 feet (6.4 by 5.5 m), and one was 24.5 by 18 feet (7.5 by 5.5 m). On either end were enclosed 10-foot (3.0 m) wide verandahs with hatrooms.

Block A, which cost £7500, was opened by the Minister for Public Instruction Frank Cooper on 9 October 1937. In 1939 a small dry stone wall on the Pashen Street boundary, in front of Block A, was replaced by a poured-concrete wall. Retaining walls with steps were at some point added south of the 1939 Pashen Street wall, forming two level terraced platforms in the upper part of the school: the eastern wall and steps (in front of Block B) existed by at least 1959; and the western wall and steps (in front of Block C) by 1960.

In July 1939, tennis courts (extant in 2018) were officially opened by the Minister for Public Education and Works, Henry Bruce. This event was soon followed by the outbreak of World War II on 3 September 1939, which had its own impact on the school grounds. After the entry of Japan into the war in December 1941, there were fears of a Japanese invasion of Australia. In response, the Queensland Government closed all coastal state schools in January 1942, and although most schools reopened on 2 March 1942, student attendance was optional until the war ended. Slit trenches, for protecting the students from Japanese air raids, were also dug at Queensland state schools, often by parents and staff.

In March 1942, a call went out for helpers to come to Morningside State School to double the existing 280 feet (85 m) of slit trenches (located south of Block L) at the school. During the war, female students also sewed and knitted items for the Australian Comforts Fund, and the Junior Red Cross Circle took gifts to a military hospital. In addition, the understorey of Block A was fitted out as an emergency hospital for air raid casualties. In 1944 an Oslo Lunch room, based on the Norwegian nutritious Oslo breakfast movement, was established under Block A and was upgraded in 1947. In 1943–1944 the area behind Block A was used to train Volunteer Defence Corps members in the operation of a Bofors (40mm) Anti-Aircraft gun.

After the war, the baby boom meant more accommodation was required at the school, as the population of Morningside rose to 4,919 in 1947 and to 8,271 in 1954. In 1949 enrolment at the school was 840. The Department of Public Instruction was largely unprepared for the enormous demand for state education between the late 1940s and the 1960s. This was a nation-wide occurrence resulting from immigration and unprecedented population growth. Queensland schools were overcrowded and, to cope, many new buildings were constructed and existing buildings were extended. Two three-classroom temporary buildings were added to Morningside State School between 1949 and 1951. A classroom, 24 by 21 feet (7.3 by 6.4 m), was also added to the east end of Block D c. 1954, with the removal of the east verandah, and a classroom of the same size was added to the east end of Block B in late 1958.

Two permanent buildings were also added to the school. From 1950 the Department of Public Instruction introduced and developed new standard plans for school buildings. These buildings were highset timber framed structures and the understorey was used as covered play space. Introduced in 1950, the principal type was a long and narrow building with a gable roof. A semi-enclosed stair connected the understorey to a north facing verandah running the length of the building. Classrooms opened off the verandah and had extensive areas of windows; almost the entirety of the verandah wall and the opposite classroom wall were glazed, allowing abundant natural light and ventilation. This building type F/T4 was the most commonly constructed in the 1950s in Queensland.

Block E (two classrooms) and Block F (three classrooms) were added to the school in 1956, south of Block D. Block F was extended to the west by one classroom in 1957. The classrooms were a standard 24 by 21 feet (7.3 by 6.4 m). Other changes to the school in the late 1950s included: enclosing under Block C's eastern teachers room for a new health services room; installing new hat and bag racks on the north verandah of Block B; enclosing the west verandah of Block C for a new staff room; and enclosing the upper west verandah of Block L for a store room. Also in the late 1950s, the open space between Blocks C and F became the main assembly area, with new paving added to the south of the existing paving near Block C; the space between Blocks B and D was paved as a parade area; and spaces to the north and south of Block A were paved for winter and summer assembly areas respectively. In December 1958 the paving work was authorised to be carried out by day labour.

Additions continued in the 1960s and 1970s, despite a drop in enrolments when Grade 8 was transferred to the high schools in 1964. A swimming pool, funded by the efforts of the school and parents, was constructed west of Block L by November 1964. The school grounds were also extended to the west in the mid-1960s, creating the school playing field and expanding the grounds to a total of 1.99 hectares (4.9 acres). In 1972, plans were drawn for a new fire escape to the upper northern verandah of Block L, and the enclosure of the western verandah of Block L was extended onto the northern verandah to create a male staffroom. In 1973, a toilet block for senior boys and girls was constructed south of Block F; a dental clinic was built c. 1978 and Block J was built c. 1979 south of Block A, replacing the earlier temporary classroom building. J Block was built by May 1980.

From the 1980s, further structures were added to the school grounds, including covered play areas, and changes were made to existing buildings. In the 1980s, a tuckshop was added under Block F and a pre-school was created under Block A. In the late 1990s, under the Building Better Schools program, changes were made to classroom partitioning in blocks B and C, creating fewer, larger classrooms. In the 2000s, further partitioning was added to the understorey of Block A.

In 2014 an ANZAC memorial garden was created at the east end of Block B, with a small WWII Memorial (date unknown) commemorating the Rats of Tobruk being relocated there from the southeast corner of the school. Constructed as a small replica of a monument built in 1941 by Australian Divisional Engineers in the Tobruk War Cemetery, Libya, the memorial is of a stepped, Art-Deco design and stands on a stepped plinth.

As at 2018, the school continues to operate from its original site. It retains its four sectional school buildings, Depression-era brick infants school building, and two highset timber school buildings, set in landscaped grounds with sporting facilities, playing areas, retaining walls and mature shade trees. Morningside State School is important to Morningside, as a key social focus for the community, as generations of students have been taught there and many social events held in the school's grounds and buildings since its establishment. A school history was compiled for the school's 50th anniversary in 1976.

== Description ==
Morningside State School occupies a 1.986-hectare (4.91-acre) terraced site in the residential suburb of Morningside, approximately 3.8 km east of Brisbane CBD. Fronting Pashen Street to the north, the school is bounded on other sides by residential and commercial properties (east and west), and Stephens Street and Palm Square (south). The site steps down from the east, with the complex of significant school buildings and structures primarily aligned with the highest sections to the east.

The seven significant buildings within the school complex are:

- Block A - 1937 Depression-era brick infants school building
- Block B - 1927 (extended 1958) sectional school building
- Block C - 1926 sectional school building
- Block D - 1927 (extended 1954) sectional school building
- Block E - 1956 hghset timber school building
- Block F - 1956 (extended 1957) highset timber school building
- Block L - 1930 sectional school building

Other significant elements on the site include:

- masonry fencing, gateways and steps to Pashen Street
- retaining walls with steps in front of Blocks B and C
- a World War II memorial to the Rats of Tobruk;
- tennis courts in the northwest corner of the site.

=== Depression-era brick infants school building (Block A) ===
Block A is a symmetrical, masonry structure of one storey, highset on an understorey. The building faces Pashen Street to the north and is approximately rectangular in plan, with protruding enclosures to the east and west. It is elegantly composed and ornamented with modest Art Deco-style treatments and its red-brown face brick exterior is contrasted by painted render dressings. The building has a Dutch-gable roof, clad in terracotta tiles and featuring vented timber gablets, and the eaves are lined in V-jointed (VJ) timber boards.

An entrance bay projecting from the centre of the northern elevation is reached by an imperial concrete stair with a metal balustrade. It has a stepped, rendered parapet, featuring the words "MORNINGSIDE STATE SCHOOL" above a stepped, rendered doorway surround. The north and south elevations have regularly spaced banks of windows with fanlights, sheltered by continuous terracotta tile-clad window hoods with timber brackets. A singular bank of windows is centred on the eastern and western elevations, with high-level windows to the understorey.

The first floor layout comprises a short entrance hall leading to a perpendicular central corridor (that runs east-west). To the north and south of the corridor are classrooms and teachers rooms, now used as staffrooms and offices. The northern rooms are connected by folding partitions, which are modern replacements in the original opening. At both ends of the corridor are enclosed hatrooms (now storerooms) and concrete stairwells with metal balustrades that lead down to the understorey. Modern timber partitions inserted into some of the rooms are not of state heritage significance.

Internal masonry walls are lined with plaster. The circulation spaces have coved concrete skirtings and a moulding at skirting board and dado height scribed into the plaster walls. Other rooms have simple timber skirtings and omit the mouldings. Ceilings are lined in flat sheets with timber battens, and original lattice ceiling vents have been retained (although some have been boarded over).

Early timber joinery retained within the building includes: moulded picture rails; double-hung windows with fanlights to the corridor walls; casements with fanlights to exterior walls; and panelled French doors with fanlights. Doors and windows generally do not have architraves, except in the circulation spaces.

The understorey is accessed from ground level or via the internal stairwells. Modern lightweight partitions (not significant) have been added to form additional classroom space in the former open play space. Toilets and store rooms are located at the eastern and western ends. Most brick piers have rounded corners below head-height. Early walls are brick, floors are concrete and an early timber seat is retained in the southwestern corner.

=== Sectional school buildings (Blocks B, C, D, and L) ===
The sectional school buildings are timber-framed buildings orientated on east-west axes, parallel to Pashen Street. Most buildings are either entirely or partially highset to compensate for the sloping terrain. Each has: a corrugated metal-clad Dutch-gable roof (the eastern ends of blocks B and D are gabled - indicative of 1954–58 extensions); timber weatherboard-clad exterior walls; timber floors; and concrete stumps or piers. Teachers rooms connect to the verandah of Block C.

The mostly north-facing verandahs are connected and run the length of the buildings. They are generally accessed via timber stairs (some are modern replacements), with the exception of the eastern ends of Blocks B, C and D, which can be accessed from ground-level. All verandah walls are single-skin, with VJ timber board linings and externally-exposed timber stud-framing. The verandahs have square timber posts, raked ceilings lined in timber VJ boards, and timber balustrades with timber battens. Hatrooms are located in the corners of some verandahs and bag racks have replaced some balustrading.

Early interior wall and ceiling linings are VJ timber boards. Original coved ceilings with exposed metal tie rods and square lattice ceiling ventilation panels survive in most early classrooms (some vents have been boarded over). Block C's teachers rooms retain their flat VJ-lined timber ceilings and walls. Skirtings are simple-profiled timber. Later sections at the eastern ends of Blocks B and D can be identified by flat ceiling and wall linings, and taller window banks with differing sill heights and later joinery / mechanisms on the southern sides. While most interior partitions between classrooms have been removed or modified to form larger teaching spaces, locations of original partitions can generally be identified though wall remnants on the northern and southern walls and bulkheads. A small section of a partition, including a former door opening, is retained in the centre of the ground floor of Block L.

A range of early timber joinery is retained throughout the buildings, including: large banks of casement windows with fanlights in the southern walls; double-hung windows with fanlights in the verandah walls; casement windows to the teachers rooms; and timber dual panelled doors to some classrooms. Some retain their early hardware. Recent aluminium sashes have replaced timber joinery in some locations within existing openings, and are not of cultural heritage significance.

The understoreys that are accessible are mostly play space, and generally have concrete slab floors, concrete piers and ceilings of exposed timber framing (from the floor above). Some understorey areas are enclosed, including with early timber-framed and -lined partitions to the western and southeastern ends of Block C (former toilets; c. 1934) and with timber weatherboards to the eastern teachers room of Block C (c. 1958). Original off-form concrete walls have been retained, including a wall at the western end of Block C and a half-height sloping wall at the southeastern end of Block C.

=== Highset timber school buildings (Blocks E and F) ===
Block E and F are long classroom buildings, highset on concrete piers to provide playspace to the understoreys. The buildings have gable roofs clad in corrugated metal and exterior walls are clad in timber weatherboards, with narrow timber chamferboards to verandah walls. The southern (Block E) and western (Block F) walls are clad in metal sheets. Timber stairs access the verandahs (north, Block F; and west, Block E).

Block E comprises two classrooms connected by a recent concertina door (within an original folding door opening). Block F has four classrooms, each connected by doors at the southern end of room partitions (some partitions have been partially removed). The walls and ceilings of both blocks are lined in flat sheets with rounded cover-strips. The timber floors have been lined in recent carpet and linoleum (recent linings are not of significance).

The verandahs have timber posts, timber floors, raked ceilings lined in timber boards, and enclosed bag rack balustrades clad in metal sheets.

The eastern (Block E) and southern (Block F) walls have large banks of timber-framed awning windows with fanlights, and verandah walls have double-hung timber windows with fanlights. Timber French doors provide access to the classrooms, and half-glazed timber doors are retained within classroom partitions. Timber-framed screens with fixed glazing are retained at the southern end of Block E's verandah and to the walkway between blocks E and F.

The understoreys of the blocks primarily comprise open play space. The timber floor structures of the classrooms above are exposed, and the floors of the understoreys are concrete slabs.

=== Landscape elements ===
The school grounds are well-established and are terraced along the northern side of the site with concrete and stone retaining walls and steps. The southeastern boundaries of the site comprise open-cut stone excavations - a remnant of a former quarry site.

A concrete retaining wall forms a fence along the Pashen Street boundary and features decorative, Art-Deco-style piers at the entrances. Timber formwork impressions are set within the concrete.

Two retaining walls with concrete stairs stand between Pashen Street and Blocks B (by 1959) and C (by 1960). The wall adjacent Block C is battered, with stones set within the concrete, and the wall adjacent Block B is of concrete.

Two tennis courts (1939) stand in their original location at the northwest corner of the site, and have been resurfaced. An open playing field is located south of the tennis courts.

A painted concrete WWII memorial stands within an Anzac memorial garden (2014) east of Block B, and is dedicated to the Rats of Tobruk. It is of a stepped, Art-Deco design, with metal crosses fixed to the highest tier; and stands on a stepped plinth. The memorial displays the crest of the Rats of Tobruk Association, and a plaque with words which form part of traditional Anzac Day ceremonies in Australia:

This is hallowed ground for here lie those who died for their country.

"At the going down of the sun, and in the morning, we will remember them"

'- Lest We Forget - '

Former assembly areas to the north and south of Block A, and between Blocks B and D, and Blocks C and F, retain their open character, allowing light and ventilation to interior classroom spaces.

The setback and open space between Pashen Street and Blocks A, B, C and L afford views of the buildings from the street and contribute to the place's prominence and streetscape presence.

== Heritage listing ==
Morningside State School was listed on the Queensland Heritage Register on 24 April 2018 having satisfied the following criteria.

The place is important in demonstrating the evolution or pattern of Queensland's history.

Morningside State School (established in 1926) is important in demonstrating the evolution of state education and its associated architecture in Queensland. The place retains excellent, representative examples of standard government designs that were architectural responses to prevailing government educational philosophies, set in landscaped grounds with assembly and play areas, sporting facilities and mature trees.

The Depression-era brick infants school building (1937) and concrete retaining wall to Pashen Street (1939) are a result of the Queensland Government's building and relief work programs during the 1930s that stimulated the economy and provided work for men unemployed as a result of the Great Depression.

The sectional school buildings (1926–30) are important in demonstrating the evolution of Department of Public Works (DPW) timber school designs to provide adequate lighting and ventilation; equally recognising educational and climatic needs.

The highset timber school buildings (1956–57) are important in representing the continued evolution of DPW timber building designs during the 1950s.

The World War II (WWII) memorial commemorating the Rats of Tobruk is important in demonstrating the school community's involvement in WWII. War memorials are a tribute from the community to those who served, and those who died. They are an important element of Queensland's towns and cities and are also important in demonstrating a common pattern of commemoration across Queensland and Australia.

The place is important in demonstrating the principal characteristics of a particular class of cultural places.

Morningside State School is important in demonstrating the principal characteristics of a Queensland state school of the early to mid-20th century, comprising teaching buildings constructed to standard designs by the Queensland Government; set in landscaped grounds with assembly and play areas, sporting facilities and mature trees.

The Depression-era brick infants school building is an excellent, substantial, and intact example of its type, demonstrating the principal characteristics, which include: a handsome edifice standing at the front of the school; symmetrical two-storey form of classrooms and teachers rooms above an understorey of open play space; a linear layout of the main floor with rooms accessed by a corridor; loadbearing masonry construction; prominent projecting central entrance bay; and a high-quality design that provides superior educational environments focusing on abundant natural light and ventilation. It demonstrates the use of stylistic features of its era, which determined its roof form, joinery, and decorative treatment.

The sectional school buildings are good, intact examples of their type. Principal characteristics include: their timber-framed construction; highset form with play space underneath; Dutch-gable and gable roofs; blank end walls; connected northern verandahs with single skin verandah walls and double-hung windows; large banks of south-facing casement windows (replaced in Block D); projecting teachers rooms (Block C); hat rack enclosures; timber joinery; and coved ceilings, with metal tie rods and square lattice ceiling ventilation panels. The original classroom sizes are still readable, due to the surviving nibs and bulkheads.

The highset timber school buildings are good, intact examples of their type and retain: their timber-framed construction; gable roofs; highset form with concrete piers and play space underneath; verandahs for circulation; glazed screens at verandah ends; double-hung windows to the verandahs; and large banks of timber-framed awning windows to the rear elevation (east, Block E; and south, Block F).

The place is important because of its aesthetic significance.

Through its substantial size, materials, symmetry, elegant composition, restrained use of decoration, and fine craftsmanship, the Depression-era brick infants school building has aesthetic significance due to its expressive attributes, by which the Department of Public Works sought to convey the concepts of progress and permanence.

The building is also significant for its streetscape contribution, and is an attractive and prominent feature of the area.

The place has a strong or special association with a particular community or cultural group for social, cultural or spiritual reasons.

Schools have always played an important part in Queensland communities. They typically retain significant and enduring connections with former pupils, parents, and teachers; provide a venue for social interaction and volunteer work; and are a source of pride, symbolising local progress and aspirations.

Morningside State School has a strong and ongoing association with the Morningside community. It was established in 1926 through the fundraising efforts of the local community and generations of Morningside children have been taught there. The place is important for its contribution to the educational development of Morningside and is a prominent community focal point.
