= John Blair (Australian footballer) =

Australian rules footballer (born 1955)

Personal information
- Full name: John R. Blair
- Born: 17 March 1955 (age 71)
- Original team: Noble Park Football Club
- Height: 188 cm (6 ft 2 in)
- Weight: 85 kg (187 lb)

Playing career^{1}
Years	Club	Games (Goals)
1975–1978	South Melbourne	27 (31)
1978	Fitzroy	4 (2)
1980	St Kilda	2 (0)
Total		33 (33)
- ^{1} Playing statistics correct to the end of 1980.

John Blair (born 17 March 1955) is a former Australian rules footballer who played with the South Melbourne Football Club, (now Sydney Swans) Fitzroy Football Club (now Brisbane Lions) and St Kilda Football Club in the Victorian Football League (VFL). He has since become a successful coach in Queensland.

A utility, Blair spent a lot of his career as a centre-half back but was also used up forward. He had begun his career at Noble Park Football Club and it was from there he was recruited to South Melbourne. He made his VFL debut in 1975, against Footscray at Waverley Park, but it was the only game he played that season. Over the next two years he put together 23 senior appearances, only to be traded to Fitzroy during the 1978 season. He didn't play a VFL match in 1979 and in 1980 was playing for his third club, St Kilda. He appeared just twice for St Kilda and left at the end of the year, to captain-coach Queensland club Morningside in the QAFL.

Also in the 1980s John received a bravery award from the Royal Humane Society of Australasia for the courage and humanity displayed by John in going to the rescue of a man in the Brisbane River on 16 December 1984.

Blair, who won the Grogan Medal in 1982, steered Morningside to the QAFL grand final every year from 1982 to 1984. Each time they lost, to different clubs, but Blair would later play in a premiership team at Windsor-Zillmere in 1988, before retiring. He had been their best forward that season, with 96 goals. It was the second time he had been the league's leading goal-kicker, having kicked 86 goals with Morningside in 1985. Before coming to Windsor-Zillmere, he had a brief stint with Sandgate. During the 1980s he had been a regular interstate football representative, playing for Queensland 19 times.

In the 1990s, Blair was involved in coaching with the Brisbane Bears and the Brisbane Lions, before becoming involved with coaching the State Under 18's from 1996 -2001 in the National Championship, from which young men were eligible to be drafted to AFL clubs. Blair returned to his old stomping ground, the Morningside Panthers at QAFL level, supposedly for two years in 2002. He ended up staying for ten years with the club having an amazing run of success. They played finals every year, with two preliminary finals and seven grand finals that included: back to back premierships, in 2003/2004, and again in 2009/2010.

After losing the 2011 Grand Final to Northern Territory Blair decided to retire. It was a short retirement of one year, as Blair accepted the Senior Coaching role at the Aspley Football Club in the newly formed Northern Eastern Australian Football League. Success was immediate with Aspley playing in three grand finals within three consecutive years: 2013 runners up to the Brisbane Lions - by 26 points, 2014 Premiers against the Sydney Swans - by 2 points and runners up by 1 point to Northern Territory. After finishing preliminary finals for the next three years, Blair finally did retire, so as he could travel with his wife around Australia and to visit their two daughters who reside in the UK and to spend more time with their son who lives in Brisbane.

Blair has coached over 520 senior AFL games throughout his football career and was in the initial 150 inductees into the Queensland Football Hall of Fame in 2008. He was elevated to legend status in 2013. This is an honor that has only been given to nine other people. Blair is still involved by his commitment to speaking and instructing at coaching courses throughout Queensland.
