= Morningside railway station, Queensland =

Railway station in Queensland, Australia

Morningside
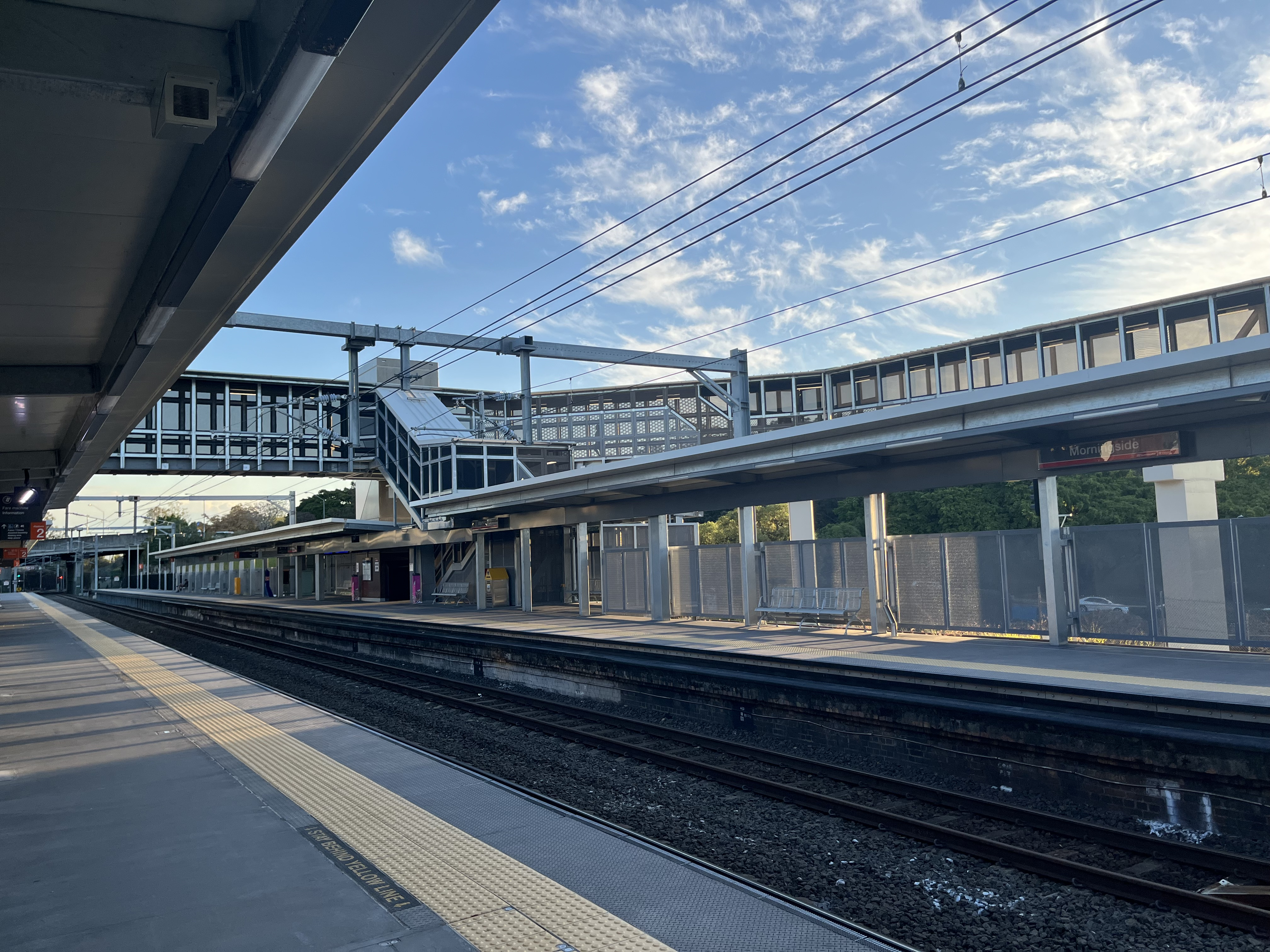
- Inbound view in August 2026

General information
- Location: Waminda Street, Morningside
- Coordinates: 27°28′16″S 153°04′10″E
- Owner: Queensland Rail
- Operator: Queensland Rail
- Line: Cleveland
- Distance: 10.52 kilometres from Central
- Platforms: 2 side
- Tracks: 3

Construction
- Structure type: Ground
- Parking: 186 bays
- Cycle facilities: Yes
- Accessible: Assisted

Other information
- Station code: 600254 (platform 1); 600255 (platform 2)
- Fare zone: Zone 1
- Website: Translink

History
- Opened: 1888
- Rebuilt: 30 December 2024
- Former names: Bulimba

Services
Preceding station	Queensland Rail	Following station
Norman Park towards Shorncliffe via Roma Street	Cleveland line	Cannon Hill towards Cleveland
Location

Morningside is a railway station operated by Queensland Rail on the Cleveland line. It opened in 1888 and serves the Brisbane suburb of Morningside. It is a ground level station, featuring two side platforms.

== History ==
Morningside station opened in 1888 as Bulimba, being renamed Morningside shortly afterwards.

On 26 May 1996, the timber station building was burnt out and later demolished. On 15 July 1996, the Fisherman Islands line to the Port of Brisbane opened to the north of the station.

From 22 January 2024 to 30 December 2024, the station was temporarily closed for a station upgrade, including improvements to accessibility, facilities, and the addition of a footbridge and lifts.

== Services ==
Morningside is served by Cleveland line services from Shorncliffe, Northgate, Doomben and Bowen Hills to Cannon Hill, Manly and Cleveland.

== Platforms and services ==
Morningside platform arrangement
Platform	Line	Destination	Notes
1	Cleveland	Cleveland	
2	Cleveland	Roma Street (to Shorncliffe line)	
