= Shane Morwood =

Australian rules footballer, born 1961

Personal information
- Born: 1 December 1961 (age 64)
- Original team: Noble Park

Playing career^{1}
| Years | Club | Games (Goals) |
| 1981–1982 | South Melbourne/Sydney | 17 (13) |
| 1983–1993 | Collingwood | 195 (111) |
| 1994 | Frankston | 9 (6) |
| Total | | 221 (130) |
- ^{1} Playing statistics correct to the end of 1993.

Career highlights
- Collingwood premiership player 1990

Shane Morwood (born 1 December 1961) is a former Australian rules footballer who played in the VFL/AFL.

From Noble Park, Morwood played alongside his brother Paul at South Melbourne, but in 1982 he quit the club, refusing to move to Sydney with the re-location of South Melbourne into the Sydney Swans. He then was recruited by Collingwood in what seemed to be a recruiting frenzy by the Pies, as they were in a development period. Morwood would soon become an experienced backman, yet could play on either flank, but under Leigh Matthews he was played as a defender, and his role as bringing the ball out of trouble saw him become one of the best defenders in the game.

In 1988 Morwood represented Victoria for the first time, and would play State of Origin footy the next two seasons in the 'Big V'. His form from the backline gave him selection in the official VFL 'Team of the Year', placed on the Interchange. In 1990 he would be a member of the Magpies premiership side, their first Grand Final win since 1958, and would break the 'colli-wobbles' curse.

After thirteen seasons, Morwood retired from the AFL at the end of 1993, with over 200 games to his name. In 1994 he played in the Victorian Football Association with Frankston.
