= Morewood School =

- U.S. National Register of Historic Places
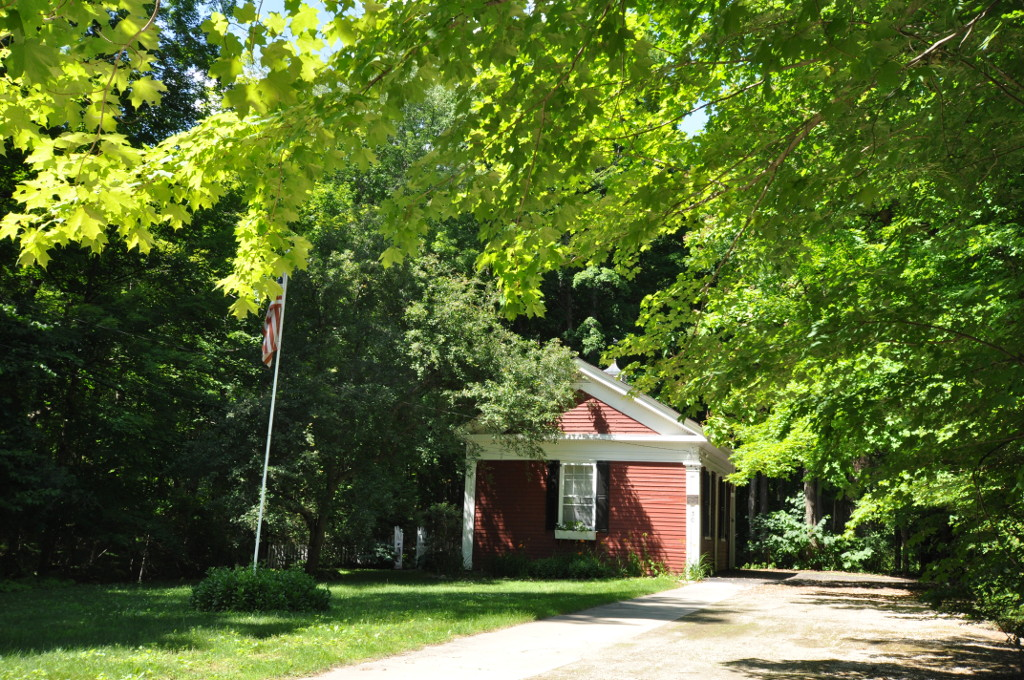

- Location within Massachusetts Location within the United States
- Location: S. Mountain Rd., Pittsfield, Massachusetts
- Coordinates: 42°25′48″N 73°15′38″W
- Area: 0.4 acres (0.16 ha)
- Built: 1843
- Architectural style: Greek Revival
- NRHP reference No.: 84002084
- Added to NRHP: May 31, 1984

The Morewood School is a historic one-room schoolhouse at 30 South Mountain Road in Pittsfield, Berkshire County, Massachusetts. Built in 1843, it was converted to a vacation cottage in the 1980s after serving for 130 years as a schoolhouse. It was listed on the National Register of Historic Places in 1984. Originally located on 4 acres (1.6 ha) around 1825, the lot has been reduced to 1 acre (0.40 ha).

== History ==
Named after the Morewood family who owned "Broad Hall", the current Pittsfield Country Club, the schoolhouse was built around 1843. According to a record book retained by the Berkshire County Historical Society kept by Jesse Oliver Howard, who attended the school in 1865, the original school house burned in June 1841 when several classmates started a fire in the playground during the noon time recess. When Jesse Howard attended the school, the pupils ranged in age from 4–16 years old sitting in benches with no backs. Until 1925, water was drawn from the Howard brook in the wood next to the school. Morewood educated the children of the local early families such as the Howards, Luces and Melvilles. Herman Melville wrote Moby Dick and three other novels while living with his family in the nearby Arrowhead farm from 1850-1863.

The school in 1919

Horace Mann accepted the position of First Secretary of the State Board of Education in Massachusetts in 1837 when Edward Everett was governor. He took office at a time when glaring weaknesses existed in public education in Massachusetts. He went to Pittsfield in the Berkshire Hills, in western Massachusetts to hold a "teachers’ institute," or convention. He reached the town, in the morning, only to find that no arrangements had been made, and that the little red schoolhouse in which the institute was to be held was in no presentable condition.

When Governor Everett saw the condition of the schoolhouse, both he and Mr. Mann were determined to conquer what the secretary called "the arctic regions of Pittsfield" (because of its lack of interest); so, while the secretary was "putting things to rights", the governor made a raid on the nearest dwelling house, borrowed two brooms, and when the aroused and curious inhabitants strolled into the schoolhouse, they stood open-eyed with wonder to see the governor of the Commonwealth of Massachusetts and the secretary of the State Board of Education sweeping and dusting the schoolroom, so that everything might be presentable when the hour for the institute arrived.

Several of the schools that he established still remain standing today in Berkshire County. It is very likely the Morewood School, the only surviving one room "red school" house, is the same school used for Horace Mann's historical teacher's institute.

The school house has the longest continuous use as a school in New England, seeing continuous use for 130 years. It was used as Pittsfield's USA Bicentennial Headquarters in 1975. The building was sold to Bob and Karen Clydesdale in 1984 and modernized while retaining the unique Greek revival exterior design features. It is now used as a vacation rental cottage.

== See also ==
- National Register of Historic Places listings in Berkshire County, Massachusetts
