= Andrew Tarpey =

Australian rules footballer

Personal information
- Full name: Andrew Tarpey
- Born: 25 July 1965 (age 61)
- Original team: Oakleigh District (SESFL)
- Debut: 21 August 1988, Collingwood vs. West Coast, at Subiaco Oval
- Height: 196 cm (6 ft 5 in)
- Weight: 95 kg (209 lb)
- Position: Forward

Playing career^{1}
Years	Club	Games (Goals)
1988–1991	Collingwood	9 (1)
1991–1992	Sandringham (VFL)	
1992–1993	Richmond	0 (0)
1994–1995	Sandringham (VFL)	33 (81)
- ^{1} Playing statistics correct to the end of 1995.

Career highlights
- Joseph Wren Memorial Trophy 1989; Sandringham premiership player 1992, 1994

Andrew Tarpey (born 25 July 1965) is a former Australian rules footballer who played with Collingwood in the Victorian/Australian Football League (VFL/AFL).

Tarpey joined Collingwood in mid-1988 from South East Suburban Football League club Oakleigh District, where he played with his brother Howard, after recovering from ACL Reconstruction in 1986.

Tarpey played 9 senior games for Collingwood, scoring one goal, but did contribute at the reserves level, winning the Joseph Wren Memorial Trophy in 1989.

After leaving Collingwood at the end of 1991, he joined Sandringham in the Victorian Football League (VFL), winning with them the 1992 premiership. He had been drafted by the Richmond Football Club in the 1992 Mid-Season Draft, but opted to stay with Sandringham and did not play any senior games for Richmond.

Tarpey joined Smithton as a captain coach in 1993. After that he returned to Sandringham in 1994, winning another premiership with the club. In 1995 he only played 3 games before succumbing to injury.

In 1996, Tarpey played for Clayton in the Southern Football League (SFL).
