= Steven Morewood =

English lecturer and historian

Steven Morewood FRHistS is Senior Lecturer of International History in the School of Historical Studies at the University of Birmingham. He has been elected a FRHistS.

After a degree, his first teaching post was as lecturer of Social and Economic History at the University of Leicester. From there a PhD followed at University of Bristol in 1985 under the external examiner Esmonde Robertson, a founder of the subject area at the London School of Economics. He published his first book, Pioneers and Inheritors in 1990, which was quickly followed by a co-written history of Eastern Europe. He followed by a contribution to the edited collection of essays in 1995 The Chiefs of Staff and men on the spot.

Previously a lecturer at the University of Leicester and the University of Manchester, he has supervised both PhD and postgraduate MPhil courses on Modern Eastern Mediterranean History. He is currently in 2016, the external examiner for students of history at the University of Hull, and a contributor of History Today magazine.
