= Howard Tarpey =

Australian rules footballer

Personal information
- Full name: Howard Kevin Tarpey
- Born: 30 March 1958 (age 68)
- Original team: Oakleigh District (SESFL) / Morningside (QAFL)
- Height: 187 cm (6 ft 2 in)
- Weight: 81 kg (179 lb)

Playing career^{1}
Years	Club	Games (Goals)
1979	South Melbourne	1 (0)
- ^{1} Playing statistics correct to the end of 1979.

Howard Kevin Tarpey (born 30 March 1958) is a former Australian rules footballer who played with South Melbourne in the Victorian Football League (VFL).

He is the older brother of former Collingwood player Andrew Tarpey.
