= Tony Morwood =

Australian rules footballer

Personal information
- Full name: Anthony Morwood
- Born: 17 May 1960 (age 66)
- Original team: Noble Park
- Height: 185 cm (6 ft 1 in)
- Weight: 76 kg (168 lb)

Playing career^{1}
| Years | Club | Games (Goals) |
| 1978–1989 | South Melbourne/Sydney | 229 (397) |
- ^{1} Playing statistics correct to the end of 1989.

Anthony Morwood (born 17 May 1960) is a former Australian rules footballer who played for the Sydney Swans in the Victorian Football League (VFL).

He was usually seen in the half forward flank and it was in that position that he was named in the Swans' 'Team of the Century'.

In 1990, Morwood joined the Hobart Football Club (then captain/coached by former Swan Mark Browning) in the Tasmanian Football League in mid-season as a fly-in player and played in the Tigers 1990 premiership team before retiring days after the grand final. He played for Frankston in the Victorian Football Association in 1993.

Morwood twice topped the goalkicking charts for his club.
