= Balmoral State High School =

Location
- Balmoral, Queensland; Australia; 27°27′22.04″S 153°4′23.04″E

Information
- Type: Public, co-educational, secondary, day school
- Motto: Latin: consilio at animo (By wisdom and courage / With purpose and spirit)
- Established: 1958
- Principal: Andrew Noble
- Grades: 7–12
- Enrolment: 950
- Colours: Bottle green and shadow
- Website: balmoralshs.eq.edu.au

Balmoral State High School is a secondary school in Balmoral, Queensland, Australia. The school opened in February 1958.

The school has an enrolment of 950 students and is a part of the Gateway Learning Community (GLC). The GLC is an alliance of six local primary schools and Balmoral State High School.

== Houses ==
The school has a house system. There are four houses, which are identified by name and colour. The school's houses are:

- Coffey (red)
- Toyne (orange)
- Tunstall (purple)
- Wilson (blue)

== Curriculum ==
The school follows the Australian Curriculum, with specialist subjects including aerospace studies, design & technology, psychology, philosophy, history, legal studies, food & nutrition, fashion, Japanese, football academy, film & television, drama, art, dance, music academy, and music.

== Co-curricular activities ==
Balmoral State High School has many academic, sporting and cultural programmes, including the Boeing Enterprise Team, Football, soccer (sport) excellence programme, Music Academy, student radio station, instrumental music programme, choir, and biennial musical production.

The school is one of 16 within the Gateway Aerospace Schools Project. This project is a joint initiative between Education Queensland, Aviation Australia, Aviation industries and selected schools, and is designed to promote and develop careers in the aerospace industry.

The school also has a formal relationship with Boeing Defence Australia and offers students the Boeing Enterprise Team, which is mentored by senior Boeing staff. This initiative is designed to provide real-life business management experiences within a working team.

== Facilities ==
Balmoral State High School has large suburban grounds of over 30 acres. The grounds include three sports ovals, two futsal courts, one inside and two outside basketball courts. The school's learning spaces include a trades training centre, including modern metal fabrication machinery, a studio theatre, an indoor sports complex, a film & television facility, a home economics precinct, specialist science laboratories, a 500-seat hall, a purpose-built access centre, and five eLearning PC laboratories. Balmoral is currently undergoing further construction work as a part of the Education Queensland build and upgrade initiative.
