= List of VFL debuts in 1918 =

The 1918 Victorian Football League (VFL) season was the 22nd season of the VFL. The season saw 74 Australian rules footballers make their senior VFL debut and a further 12 transfer to new clubs having previously played in the VFL.

== Summary ==
Summary of debuts in 1918
| Club | VFL debuts | Change of club |
|---|---|---|
| Carlton | 7 | 4 |
| Collingwood | 5 | 1 |
| Essendon | 19 | 1 |
| Fitzroy | 9 | 2 |
| Geelong | 7 | 0 |
| Richmond | 3 | 2 |
| South Melbourne | 11 | 0 |
| St Kilda | 13 | 2 |
| Total | 74 | 12 |

== Debuts ==
| Name | Club | Age at debut | Round debuted | Games | Goals | Notes |
|---|---|---|---|---|---|---|
| Fred Johnson | Carlton | 22 years, 17 days | 1 | 77 | 0 | |
| Ern Cowley | Carlton | 25 years, 267 days | 1 | 24 | 51 | Represented Victoria in baseball. Invented Austus, a hybrid of Australian rules and American football that was played during World War II. |
| Leo Tasker | Carlton | 17 years, 202 days | 1 | 15 | 13 | Previously played for Geelong. |
| Harry Furnell | Carlton | 19 years, 213 days | 3 | 13 | 16 | |
| Jack Woolley | Carlton | 32 years, 130 days | 7 | 12 | 7 | Previously played for Essendon and Melbourne. |
| Frank Mercovich | Carlton | 20 years, 130 days | 11 | 10 | 11 | Australian national figure skating champion in 1934 and 1936. Married to Joyce Macbeth, three time world champion women's figure skater. |
| Jim Howe | Carlton | 22 years, 206 days | 4 | 8 | 2 | |
| Ray Stewart | Carlton | 26 years, 147 days | 11 | 8 | 1 | Previously played for Richmond. |
| Jack Keily | Carlton | 19 years, 278 days | 1 | 4 | 0 | |
| Percy Jackson | Carlton | 24 years, 47 days | 2 | 1 | 1 | Previously played for South Melbourne and St Kilda. |
| Bill Clohesy | Carlton | 23 years, 222 days | 6 | 1 | 0 | |
| Bill Twomey | Collingwood | 19 years, 46 days | 8 | 54 | 5 | Father of Mick, Pat, and Bill Twomey Jr., and grandson of David Twomey. |
| Bill Walton | Collingwood | 23 years, 264 days | 3 | 27 | 17 | |
| Mick Maguire | Collingwood | 23 years, 339 days | 1 | 9 | 10 | Father of Mary Maguire. Previously played for Richmond and Melbourne. |
| Stan McKenzie | Collingwood | 21 years, 261 days | 2 | 9 | 0 | |
| Stan Yates | Collingwood | 17 years, 353 days | 3 | 8 | 6 | Uncle of Ken Turner and great uncle of Jamie Turner. |
| Jack O'Connor | Collingwood | 17 years, 191 days | 2 | 3 | 1 | |
| Jimmy Sullivan | Essendon | 22 years, 33 days | 1 | 90 | 20 | |
| Tom Fitzmaurice | Essendon | 19 years, 315 days | 1 | 85 | 30 | |
| Bert Drinkwater | Essendon | 22 years, 253 days | 5 | 27 | 15 | |
| Dave Walsh | Essendon | 19 years, 224 days | 1 | 25 | 18 | |
| Norm Dunn | Essendon | 22 years, 110 days | 1 | 14 | 3 | |
| Leo McInerney | Essendon | 20 years, 17 days | 1 | 12 | 2 | |
| Paddy McDonald | Essendon | 21 years, 94 days | 8 | 9 | 3 | Brother of Frank McDonald. |
| Phil Furlong | Essendon | 25 years, 82 days | 1 | 5 | 3 | |
| Jim Alexander | Essendon | 19 years, 148 days | 14 | 5 | 1 | |
| Harry Sawyer | Essendon | 24 years, 208 days | 2 | 4 | 0 | |
| Len Phillips | Essendon | 28 years, 48 days | 4 | 4 | 0 | Previously played for St Kilda. |
| Bill Hanson | Essendon | 24 years, 295 days | 9 | 3 | 1 | |
| Eric Sprague | Essendon | 23 years, 291 days | 9 | 3 | 0 | |
| Jack McGarity | Essendon | 21 years, 129 days | 3 | 2 | 0 | |
| Tom Greenwood | Essendon | 28 years, 296 days | 8 | 2 | 0 | |
| Bill Coffey | Essendon | 21 years, 213 days | 1 | 1 | 0 | |
| Jim Taylor | Essendon | 24 years, 203 days | 2 | 1 | 0 | |
| Sydney Barr | Essendon | 25 years, 279 days | 8 | 1 | 0 | |
| Jim Lavelle | Essendon | 22 years, 183 days | 11 | 1 | 1 | |
| George Hemingway | Essendon | 18 years, 2 days | 8 | 1 | 0 | |
| Stan Molan | Fitzroy | 24 years, 277 days | 1 | 111 | 59 | |
| Clarrie Sherry | Fitzroy | 22 years, 255 days | 3 | 75 | 3 | |
| Clarrie Featherston | Fitzroy | 25 years, 151 days | 1 | 14 | 4 | |
| Billy Billett | Fitzroy | 29 years, 355 days | 1 | 12 | 2 | |
| Les Gibaud | Fitzroy | 16 years, 345 days | 5 | 10 | 5 | |
| Bill Thorpe | Fitzroy | 21 years, 169 days | 1 | 5 | 3 | Previously played for Richmond. |
| Les Boyne | Fitzroy | 18 years, 303 days | 8 | 4 | 1 | |
| Norm Byron | Fitzroy | 20 years, 251 days | 10 | 2 | 1 | |
| Vic Nankervis | Fitzroy | 25 years, 211 days | 13 | 2 | 1 | Previously played for Essendon. |
| Cyril Zimmer | Fitzroy | 22 years, 20 days | 1 | 1 | 1 | |
| Wally Beckwith | Fitzroy | 24 years, 353 days | 2 | 1 | 0 | Father of John Beckwith. Boundary umpired the 1929 VFL Grand Final. |
| Bill Bendle | Geelong | 20 years, 230 days | 11 | 14 | 6 | |
| Duncan Moodie | Geelong | 21 years, 4 days | 1 | 12 | 0 | |
| Ambrose Maher | Geelong | 24 years, 136 days | 2 | 10 | 3 | |
| Tommy Peterson | Geelong | 20 years, 123 days | 7 | 1 | 0 | |
| Jack Sheridan | Geelong | 19 years, 277 days | 7 | 1 | 0 | |
| Ern Everett | Geelong | 25 years, 255 days | 10 | 1 | 0 | |
| Bill Gliddon | Geelong | 21 years, 323 days | 11 | 1 | 0 | |
| Pat Dooley | Richmond | 19 years, 203 days | 1 | 15 | 1 | |
| Ted Fisher | Richmond | 30 years, 353 days | 8 | 4 | 1 | Previously played for St Kilda. |
| Leo McCulloch | Richmond | 21 years, 352 days | 2 | 3 | 1 | |
| Jim Burchill | Richmond | 20 years, 268 days | 1 | 3 | 5 | |
| Frank Rigaldi | Richmond | 20 years, 345 days | 3 | 2 | 1 | Previously played for Carlton. |
| Chip Turner | South Melbourne | 24 years, 335 days | 1 | 66 | 1 | |
| Tom O'Halloran | South Melbourne | 26 years, 63 days | 1 | 62 | 12 | |
| Chris Laird | South Melbourne | 25 years, 19 days | 5 | 59 | 99 | Twin brother of Frank Laird. |
| Tammy Hynes | South Melbourne | 20 years, 280 days | 2 | 57 | 4 | |
| Reg Sampson | South Melbourne | 19 years, 38 days | 1 | 25 | 3 | |
| Jim Graham | South Melbourne | 26 years, 24 days | 1 | 15 | 0 | |
| Harry Bulpit | South Melbourne | 23 years, 26 days | 7 | 6 | 3 | |
| Frank Magill | South Melbourne | 22 years, 65 days | 4 | 2 | 0 | |
| Bill Talbot | South Melbourne | 23 years, 138 days | 13 | 2 | 0 | |
| Frank Cummins | South Melbourne | 21 years, 255 days | 5 | 1 | 0 | |
| Mick Ryan | South Melbourne | 20 years, 339 days | 7 | 1 | 0 | 1929 Australian Amateur Golf champion. |
| Bill Hannan | St Kilda | 19 years, 128 days | 1 | 29 | 0 | |
| Reg Berry | St Kilda | 25 years, 324 days | 1 | 26 | 9 | |
| Roy Ostberg | St Kilda | 21 years, 51 days | 1 | 22 | 7 | |
| Artie Dawson | St Kilda | 26 years, 363 days | 6 | 20 | 9 | |
| Alan Sinclair | St Kilda | 18 years, 24 days | 1 | 19 | 1 | |
| Carlyle Kenley | St Kilda | 26 years, 74 days | 1 | 18 | 5 | Previously played for Melbourne. |
| Pat Kennedy | St Kilda | 19 years, 285 days | 1 | 11 | 3 | |
| Reg Thompson | St Kilda | 23 years, 39 days | 2 | 8 | 4 | |
| Bert Atkins | St Kilda | 33 years, 121 days | 2 | 7 | 1 | Previously played for South Melbourne. |
| Joe Rahilly | St Kilda | 21 years, 323 days | 1 | 4 | 2 | |
| Arnold Buntine | St Kilda | 19 years, 142 days | 2 | 4 | 0 | Married to Gladys "Jim" Buntine, Australian Chief Commissioner of Girl Guides from 1962 until 1968. |
| Edwin Hogan | St Kilda | 25 years, 13 days | 3 | 2 | 0 | |
| Eric Gordon | St Kilda | 22 years, 15 days | 8 | 2 | 0 | |
| Doug Thomson | St Kilda | 21 years, 239 days | 14 | 2 | 0 | |
| Frank McPherson | St Kilda | 22 years, 101 days | 5 | 1 | 0 | |
