= 1981 VFL season =

85th season of the Victorian Football League (VFL)

1981 VFL premiership season
- Teams: 12
- Premiers: Carlton; 13th premiership
- Minor premiers: Carlton; 15th minor premiership
- Night series: Essendon; 1st Night series win
- Brownlow Medallist: Bernie Quinlan (Fitzroy); Barry Round (South Melbourne)
- Coleman Medallist: Michael Roach (Richmond)

Attendance
- Matches played: 138
- Total attendance: 3,830,231 (27,755 per match)
- Highest: 112,964

The 1981 VFL season was the 85th season of the Victorian Football League (VFL), the highest level senior Australian rules football competition in Victoria. The season featured twelve clubs, ran from 28 March until 26 September, and comprised a 22-game home-and-away season followed by a finals series featuring the top five clubs.

The premiership was won by the Carlton Football Club for the 13th time, after it defeated Collingwood by 20 points in the 1981 VFL Grand Final.

== Night series ==
Essendon defeated Carlton 9.11 (65) to 6.5 (41) in the final.

== Home-and-away season ==
=== Round 1 ===
Home team	Home team score	Away team	Away team score	Venue	Crowd	Date
North Melbourne	21.19 (145)	South Melbourne	12.25 (97)	Arden Street Oval	19,437	28 March 1981
Footscray	16.12 (108)	St Kilda	23.19 (157)	Western Oval	19,101	28 March 1981
Melbourne	16.16 (112)	Hawthorn	23.15 (153)	MCG	32,202	28 March 1981
Geelong	10.17 (77)	Essendon	10.11 (71)	Kardinia Park	37,303	28 March 1981
Fitzroy	20.13 (133)	Collingwood	22.27 (159)	Junction Oval	27,200	28 March 1981
Carlton	22.12 (144)	Richmond	12.10 (82)	VFL Park	56,372	28 March 1981

=== Round 2 ===
Home team	Home team score	Away team	Away team score	Venue	Crowd	Date
Essendon	16.15 (111)	North Melbourne	15.9 (99)	Windy Hill	26,443	4 April 1981
Collingwood	26.22 (178)	Footscray	13.6 (84)	Victoria Park	26,512	4 April 1981
South Melbourne	16.14 (110)	Richmond	22.13 (145)	Lake Oval	17,850	4 April 1981
St Kilda	14.23 (107)	Geelong	16.13 (109)	Moorabbin Oval	24,496	4 April 1981
Hawthorn	16.11 (107)	Carlton	17.21 (123)	Princes Park	31,660	4 April 1981
Fitzroy	23.17 (155)	Melbourne	16.14 (110)	VFL Park	20,107	4 April 1981

=== Round 3 ===
Home team	Home team score	Away team	Away team score	Venue	Crowd	Date
Footscray	18.11 (119)	Melbourne	18.12 (120)	Western Oval	13,256	11 April 1981
Carlton	14.24 (108)	Fitzroy	12.20 (92)	Princes Park	24,780	11 April 1981
North Melbourne	15.26 (116)	Geelong	14.5 (89)	Arden Street Oval	17,744	11 April 1981
Richmond	17.16 (118)	Essendon	16.18 (114)	MCG	61,908	11 April 1981
St Kilda	19.21 (135)	Collingwood	23.19 (157)	Moorabbin Oval	33,882	11 April 1981
South Melbourne	21.13 (139)	Hawthorn	18.9 (117)	VFL Park	21,977	11 April 1981

=== Round 4 ===
Home team	Home team score	Away team	Away team score	Venue	Crowd	Date
Melbourne	10.16 (76)	St Kilda	16.32 (128)	MCG	36,488	18 April 1981
Fitzroy	25.19 (169)	South Melbourne	14.16 (100)	Junction Oval	15,635	18 April 1981
North Melbourne	13.17 (95)	Richmond	17.22 (124)	VFL Park	48,526	18 April 1981
Essendon	11.13 (79)	Hawthorn	13.16 (94)	Windy Hill	29,597	20 April 1981
Geelong	9.14 (68)	Collingwood	11.10 (76)	Kardinia Park	42,395	20 April 1981
Footscray	11.10 (76)	Carlton	15.14 (104)	VFL Park	27,299	20 April 1981

=== Round 5 ===
Home team	Home team score	Away team	Away team score	Venue	Crowd	Date
Hawthorn	17.16 (118)	North Melbourne	11.17 (83)	Princes Park	16,106	25 April 1981
Collingwood	21.20 (146)	Melbourne	13.5 (83)	Victoria Park	30,096	25 April 1981
Richmond	15.22 (112)	Geelong	11.18 (84)	MCG	46,230	25 April 1981
South Melbourne	18.22 (130)	Footscray	9.14 (68)	Lake Oval	12,545	25 April 1981
St Kilda	10.13 (73)	Carlton	19.23 (137)	Moorabbin Oval	32,341	25 April 1981
Essendon	15.14 (104)	Fitzroy	19.11 (125)	VFL Park	33,465	25 April 1981

=== Round 6 ===
	Round 6
Saturday, 2 May (2:10 pm)	Carlton 12.15 (87)	def. by	Collingwood 22.12 (144)	Princes Park (crowd: 36,343)	Report
Saturday, 2 May (2:10 pm)	Footscray 13.13 (91)	def.	Essendon 12.11 (83)	Western Oval (crowd: 19,624)	Report
Saturday, 2 May (2:10 pm)	North Melbourne 27.17 (179)	def.	Fitzroy 19.12 (126)	Arden Street Oval (crowd: 16,219)	Report
Saturday, 2 May (2:10 pm)	Richmond 10.19 (79)	def. by	Hawthorn 23.16 (154)	MCG (crowd: 45,750)	Report
Saturday, 2 May (2:10 pm)	St Kilda 13.15 (93)	def. by	South Melbourne 15.13 (103)	VFL Park (crowd: 27,250)	Report
Sunday, 3 May (2:10 pm)	Geelong 22.21 (153)	def.	Melbourne 16.8 (104)	SCG (crowd: 11,077)	Report

=== Round 7 ===
Home team	Home team score	Away team	Away team score	Venue	Crowd	Date
Fitzroy	13.14 (92)	Richmond	12.16 (88)	Junction Oval	12,997	9 May 1981
Essendon	14.17 (101)	St Kilda	11.10 (76)	Windy Hill	16,828	9 May 1981
Collingwood	18.15 (123)	South Melbourne	7.16 (58)	Victoria Park	20,553	9 May 1981
Hawthorn	8.8 (56)	Geelong	7.17 (59)	Princes Park	13,275	9 May 1981
Melbourne	8.8 (56)	Carlton	12.24 (96)	MCG	22,020	9 May 1981
North Melbourne	17.16 (118)	Footscray	7.12 (54)	VFL Park	10,989	9 May 1981

=== Round 8 ===
Home team	Home team score	Away team	Away team score	Venue	Crowd	Date
St Kilda	8.16 (64)	North Melbourne	25.18 (168)	Moorabbin Oval	16,860	16 May 1981
South Melbourne	17.25 (127)	Melbourne	12.11 (83)	Lake Oval	12,808	16 May 1981
Richmond	25.17 (167)	Footscray	17.15 (117)	MCG	21,721	16 May 1981
Hawthorn	21.18 (144)	Fitzroy	16.19 (115)	Princes Park	17,459	16 May 1981
Geelong	12.8 (80)	Carlton	12.13 (85)	Kardinia Park	28,396	16 May 1981
Collingwood	14.3 (87)	Essendon	21.18 (144)	VFL Park	79,326	16 May 1981

=== Round 9 ===
Home team	Home team score	Away team	Away team score	Venue	Crowd	Date
Footscray	10.14 (74)	Hawthorn	11.18 (84)	Western Oval	13,789	23 May 1981
Fitzroy	13.15 (93)	Geelong	16.18 (114)	Junction Oval	15,604	23 May 1981
Carlton	25.22 (172)	South Melbourne	11.7 (73)	Princes Park	22,445	23 May 1981
Melbourne	10.10 (70)	Essendon	14.20 (104)	MCG	31,769	23 May 1981
North Melbourne	12.26 (98)	Collingwood	16.15 (111)	Arden Street Oval	24,625	23 May 1981
Richmond	20.16 (136)	St Kilda	15.15 (105)	VFL Park	40,240	23 May 1981

=== Round 10 ===
Home team	Home team score	Away team	Away team score	Venue	Crowd	Date
Hawthorn	13.17 (95)	St Kilda	11.14 (80)	Princes Park	14,961	30 May 1981
Geelong	14.8 (92)	South Melbourne	10.10 (70)	Kardinia Park	19,760	30 May 1981
Fitzroy	22.15 (147)	Footscray	10.10 (70)	Junction Oval	11,630	30 May 1981
Collingwood	17.10 (112)	Richmond	8.9 (57)	Victoria Park	37,177	30 May 1981
Essendon	11.13 (79)	Carlton	6.8 (44)	Windy Hill	30,574	30 May 1981
Melbourne	6.7 (43)	North Melbourne	25.22 (172)	VFL Park	17,015	30 May 1981

=== Round 11 ===
Home team	Home team score	Away team	Away team score	Venue	Crowd	Date
Richmond	20.16 (136)	Melbourne	14.10 (94)	MCG	31,025	6 June 1981
St Kilda	14.15 (99)	Fitzroy	7.17 (59)	Moorabbin Oval	21,672	6 June 1981
Carlton	17.13 (115)	North Melbourne	11.18 (84)	Princes Park	31,808	6 June 1981
Hawthorn	18.19 (127)	Collingwood	12.9 (81)	VFL Park	92,935	8 June 1981
Footscray	12.10 (82)	Geelong	17.15 (117)	Western Oval	24,974	8 June 1981
South Melbourne	12.8 (80)	Essendon	15.18 (108)	Lake Oval	28,588	8 June 1981

=== Round 12 ===
Home team	Home team score	Away team	Away team score	Venue	Crowd	Date
Geelong	19.21 (135)	St Kilda	4.11 (35)	Kardinia Park	22,154	13 June 1981
Carlton	21.13 (139)	Hawthorn	14.16 (100)	Princes Park	27,000	13 June 1981
Melbourne	13.12 (90)	Fitzroy	17.32 (134)	MCG	17,691	13 June 1981
North Melbourne	13.12 (90)	Essendon	18.29 (137)	Arden Street Oval	22,526	13 June 1981
Footscray	13.15 (93)	Collingwood	14.14 (98)	Western Oval	20,903	13 June 1981
Richmond	19.12 (126)	South Melbourne	16.15 (111)	VFL Park	24,588	13 June 1981

=== Round 13 ===
Home team	Home team score	Away team	Away team score	Venue	Crowd	Date
Hawthorn	20.18 (138)	South Melbourne	15.16 (106)	Princes Park	11,657	20 June 1981
Geelong	26.14 (170)	North Melbourne	8.8 (56)	Kardinia Park	27,395	20 June 1981
Essendon	12.22 (94)	Richmond	13.12 (90)	Windy Hill	30,718	20 June 1981
Collingwood	19.14 (128)	St Kilda	10.11 (71)	Victoria Park	23,669	20 June 1981
Fitzroy	20.11 (131)	Carlton	15.16 (106)	Junction Oval	18,455	20 June 1981
Melbourne	14.10 (94)	Footscray	19.11 (125)	VFL Park	15,599	20 June 1981

=== Round 14 ===
Home team	Home team score	Away team	Away team score	Venue	Crowd	Date
Carlton	15.25 (115)	Footscray	5.4 (34)	Princes Park	17,419	27 June 1981
Richmond	21.23 (149)	North Melbourne	15.16 (106)	MCG	31,212	27 June 1981
St Kilda	18.19 (127)	Melbourne	8.7 (55)	Moorabbin Oval	14,058	27 June 1981
South Melbourne	9.16 (70)	Fitzroy	14.9 (93)	Lake Oval	11,756	27 June 1981
Collingwood	13.8 (86)	Geelong	9.14 (68)	VFL Park	50,441	27 June 1981
Hawthorn	20.13 (133)	Essendon	22.19 (151)	The Gabba	20,351	28 June 1981

=== Round 15 ===
Home team	Home team score	Away team	Away team score	Venue	Crowd	Date
North Melbourne	7.13 (55)	Hawthorn	16.19 (115)	Arden Street Oval	8,160	4 July 1981
Fitzroy	8.13 (61)	Essendon	11.14 (80)	Junction Oval	18,374	4 July 1981
Carlton	6.14 (50)	St Kilda	5.5 (35)	VFL Park	21,579	4 July 1981
Geelong	12.10 (82)	Richmond	8.4 (52)	Kardinia Park	26,635	11 July 1981
Footscray	7.9 (51)	South Melbourne	17.12 (114)	Western Oval	10,478	11 July 1981
Melbourne	10.6 (66)	Collingwood	12.16 (88)	MCG	30,803	11 July 1981

=== Round 16 ===
Home team	Home team score	Away team	Away team score	Venue	Crowd	Date
Hawthorn	12.14 (86)	Richmond	20.11 (131)	Princes Park	19,519	18 July 1981
Essendon	22.21 (153)	Footscray	8.12 (60)	Windy Hill	21,588	18 July 1981
South Melbourne	22.19 (151)	St Kilda	16.4 (100)	Lake Oval	13,297	18 July 1981
Melbourne	12.7 (79)	Geelong	22.35 (167)	MCG	21,947	18 July 1981
Collingwood	11.11 (77)	Carlton	10.16 (76)	Victoria Park	30,708	18 July 1981
Fitzroy	18.13 (121)	North Melbourne	12.15 (87)	VFL Park	17,713	18 July 1981

=== Round 17 ===
Home team	Home team score	Away team	Away team score	Venue	Crowd	Date
Geelong	10.11 (71)	Hawthorn	8.9 (57)	Kardinia Park	24,750	25 July 1981
Footscray	18.8 (116)	North Melbourne	19.11 (125)	Western Oval	14,755	25 July 1981
Carlton	23.15 (153)	Melbourne	15.10 (100)	Princes Park	15,198	25 July 1981
Richmond	16.19 (115)	Fitzroy	17.14 (116)	MCG	37,589	25 July 1981
St Kilda	12.4 (76)	Essendon	12.21 (93)	Moorabbin Oval	23,126	25 July 1981
South Melbourne	18.13 (121)	Collingwood	15.13 (103)	SCG	22,238	26 July 1981

=== Round 18 ===
Home team	Home team score	Away team	Away team score	Venue	Crowd	Date
North Melbourne	16.21 (117)	St Kilda	12.13 (85)	Arden Street Oval	11,517	1 August 1981
Melbourne	12.14 (86)	South Melbourne	17.13 (115)	MCG	13,886	1 August 1981
Fitzroy	10.13 (73)	Hawthorn	7.19 (61)	Junction Oval	16,013	1 August 1981
Carlton	17.13 (115)	Geelong	12.10 (82)	Princes Park	31,507	1 August 1981
Footscray	9.15 (69)	Richmond	15.13 (103)	VFL Park	19,725	1 August 1981
Essendon	12.16 (88)	Collingwood	9.15 (69)	MCG	64,149	2 August 1981

=== Round 19 ===
Home team	Home team score	Away team	Away team score	Venue	Crowd	Date
Essendon	14.20 (104)	Melbourne	9.6 (60)	Windy Hill	15,411	8 August 1981
Collingwood	14.19 (103)	North Melbourne	11.13 (79)	Victoria Park	21,237	8 August 1981
St Kilda	9.11 (65)	Richmond	10.11 (71)	Moorabbin Oval	15,943	8 August 1981
Hawthorn	15.21 (111)	Footscray	13.12 (90)	Princes Park	8,058	8 August 1981
Geelong	11.19 (85)	Fitzroy	9.16 (70)	VFL Park	25,565	8 August 1981
South Melbourne	8.14 (62)	Carlton	13.7 (85)	MCG	24,287	9 August 1981

=== Round 20 ===
Home team	Home team score	Away team	Away team score	Venue	Crowd	Date
Carlton	15.8 (98)	Essendon	14.15 (99)	Princes Park	36,736	15 August 1981
North Melbourne	21.19 (145)	Melbourne	13.9 (87)	Arden Street Oval	7,749	15 August 1981
South Melbourne	12.14 (86)	Geelong	21.13 (139)	Lake Oval	11,489	15 August 1981
Footscray	12.14 (86)	Fitzroy	22.15 (147)	Western Oval	11,770	15 August 1981
Richmond	11.20 (86)	Collingwood	14.7 (91)	MCG	69,217	15 August 1981
St Kilda	9.14 (68)	Hawthorn	10.17 (77)	VFL Park	20,863	15 August 1981

=== Round 21 ===
Home team	Home team score	Away team	Away team score	Venue	Crowd	Date
Melbourne	15.9 (99)	Richmond	17.14 (116)	MCG	19,567	22 August 1981
Fitzroy	14.18 (102)	St Kilda	9.10 (64)	Junction Oval	12,130	22 August 1981
Essendon	26.23 (179)	South Melbourne	10.8 (68)	Windy Hill	18,773	22 August 1981
Collingwood	22.17 (149)	Hawthorn	11.10 (76)	Victoria Park	26,680	22 August 1981
Geelong	18.20 (128)	Footscray	8.11 (59)	Kardinia Park	17,573	22 August 1981
North Melbourne	8.14 (62)	Carlton	12.12 (84)	VFL Park	25,544	22 August 1981

=== Round 22 ===
Home team	Home team score	Away team	Away team score	Venue	Crowd	Date
Hawthorn	15.20 (110)	Melbourne	8.9 (57)	Princes Park	7,912	29 August 1981
Collingwood	4.9 (33)	Fitzroy	8.11 (59)	Victoria Park	32,393	29 August 1981
South Melbourne	10.14 (74)	North Melbourne	15.17 (107)	Lake Oval	8,484	29 August 1981
St Kilda	12.15 (87)	Footscray	5.8 (38)	Moorabbin Oval	11,948	29 August 1981
Richmond	5.10 (40)	Carlton	9.13 (67)	MCG	64,207	29 August 1981
Essendon	6.11 (47)	Geelong	7.13 (55)	VFL Park	75,221	29 August 1981

== Ladder ==
(P)	Premiers
	Qualified for finals

#	Team	P	W	L	D	PF	PA	%	Pts
1	Carlton (P)	22	17	5	0	2303	1768	130.3	68
2	Collingwood	22	17	5	0	2399	1957	122.6	68
3	Geelong	22	16	6	0	2224	1714	129.8	64
4	Essendon	22	16	6	0	2323	1821	127.6	64
5	Fitzroy	22	14	8	0	2413	2152	112.1	56
6	Hawthorn	22	13	9	0	2313	2114	109.4	52
7	Richmond	22	13	9	0	2323	2207	105.3	52
8	North Melbourne	22	10	12	0	2386	2293	104.1	40
9	South Melbourne	22	8	14	0	2165	2522	85.8	32
10	St Kilda	22	5	17	0	1930	2266	85.2	20
11	Footscray	22	2	20	0	1764	2680	65.8	8
12	Melbourne	22	1	21	0	1824	2873	63.5	4

Rules for classification: 1. premiership points; 2. percentage; 3. points for
Average score: 99.9
Source: AFL Tables

== Finals series ==
=== Finals week 1 ===
	Elimination final
Saturday, 5 September (2:30 pm)	Essendon 13.16 (94)	def. by	Fitzroy 16.13 (109)	VFL Park (crowd: 58,598)	Report

	Qualifying final
Saturday, 5 September (2:30 pm)	Collingwood 13.20 (98)	def. by	Geelong 16.16 (112)	MCG (crowd: 83,899)	Report

=== Finals week 2 ===
	Semi-finals
SF1: Saturday, 12 September (2:30 pm)	Collingwood 19.19 (133)	def.	Fitzroy 19.18 (132)	MCG (crowd: 85,133)	Report
SF2: Saturday, 12 September (2:30 pm)	Carlton 16.17 (113)	def.	Geelong 11.7 (73)	VFL Park (crowd: 66,078)	Report
Fitzroy trailed Collingwood by 38 points at half time, but recovered to lead by eight points entering time-on; but, late goals by Peter Daicos and Ross Brewer saw Collingwood win by one point.

=== Preliminary final ===
	Preliminary final
Saturday, 19 September (2:30 pm)	Geelong 11.9 (75)	def. by	Collingwood 12.10 (82)	VFL Park (crowd: 69,536)	Report
In an incident that has become part of football folklore, the Geelong team bus failed to pick up Garry Sidebottom on the way to VFL Park for the Preliminary Final. Apparently, due to a breakdown in communications, no Geelong officials had told Sidebottom that he was going to play, so believing that had not been chosen, Sidebottom was not at his usual stop when the bus passed.

=== Grand final ===
	Grand final
Saturday, 26 September (2:50 pm)	Carlton 12.20 (92)	def.	Collingwood 10.12 (72)	MCG (crowd: 112,964)	Report
Bruce Doull won the Norm Smith Medal.; This was the third consecutive Grand Final Collingwood had participated in and lost. This marked their eighth Grand Final defeat since their most recent premiership in 1958.; Carlton full-back Scott Howell became the first (and to date only) VFL/AFL player to represent the third generation of a family to play in Grand Finals. His father Jack E. “Chooka” Howell had played for Carlton in the 1947 VFL Grand Final, and grandfather Jack P. "Chooka" Howell had played in the 1918 Grand Final for South Melbourne.; The grand final was the last match played with the old MCG scoreboard, which was given to Manuka Oval in 1982 after the MCG installed a new colour video scoreboard. The old scoreboard still resides at Manuka Oval today.

== Season notes ==
- In the 1980/81 offseason, the East Perth Football Club from the West Australian Football League made a unilateral bid to join the VFL, potentially as early as 1983. East Perth's vision was for two WAFL clubs to join the league, as part of a transition to a national competition, and to limit the drain of talent from and provide an opportunity to play the highest level of football in Western Australia. The application was rejected.
- A protest by Richmond against the eligibility of defender Doug Cox to play for St. Kilda led to the Saints temporarily losing the points for their first two wins after Round 8. They were reinstated after Round 17 due to changes in the relevant rules, but a fine of $5000 remained.
- On 27 May, South Melbourne was fined $20,000 for poaching Stephen Allender from Carlton. Although Allender lived in South Melbourne's zone and was playing for VFA club Port Melbourne when recruited, he was residentially tied to Carlton and would remain as such until November 1983, because he had lived in Carlton's zone until February 1979. Carlton ended up granting him a clearance to South Melbourne, but South Melbourne was deemed to have broken the league's poaching laws by having "negotiated with an agent acting for a Carlton player".
- In Round 11, Kevin Bartlett became the first to play 350 VFL games, after having broken John Rantall's record for most games played during 1980.
- Malcolm Blight (North Melbourne) and Alex Jesaulenko (St Kilda) became the final ever playing coaches in VFL/AFL history. Jesaulenko retired as player after Round 8, becoming the last captain-coach; Blight was sacked as coach after Round 16, making him the last person ever to be a playing coach of a club. (Blight was not captain during his time as playing coach.) Playing coaches have since been prohibited under salary cap regulations instituted in 1987.
- The State Government granted the VFL once-off permission to trial two Sunday matches in Victoria during the season; it was the first time the VFL had been granted this permission since the once-off Sunday match in 1970 which coincided with a royal visit. Under the conditions of the trial, alcohol was not allowed to be sold at or brought to the games, and the games could not be televised. The two matches were Essendon vs Collingwood in Round 18, and South Melbourne vs Carlton in Round 19.
- On 7 August, the VFL's entire senior umpiring panel resigned over a contract dispute, due to the VFL's refusal to commit to negotiating a collective agreement with the Umpires' Association, rather than individual agreements with each umpire. The VFL hastily arranged for Round 19's matches to be umpired by a team of junior umpires, all aged between 18 and 22, from the state's minor leagues; both the junior umpires' association and the VFL umpires' association gave their approval for the juniors to serve as strikebreakers. The dispute was resolved the following week, and the senior umpires returned for Round 20.
- In Round 22, South Melbourne played its last senior VFL match at the Lake Oval (also known then as Lakeside Oval). The team relocated to Sydney in 1982 and eventually became known as the Sydney Swans.

== Awards ==
- The leading goalkicker was Michael Roach of Richmond with 86 goals
- The Brownlow Medal was shared by Bernie Quinlan and Barry Round
- The reserves premiership was won by Geelong for the second consecutive season. Geelong 21.14 (140) defeated Essendon 18.6 (114) in the grand final, held as a curtain-raiser to the seniors grand final on 26 September.

== Sources ==
- 1981 VFL season at AFL Tables
- 1981 VFL season at Australian Football
