= Gliddon =

Gliddon is a surname. Notable people with the surname include:

- Bill Gliddon (1896–1974), Australian rules footballer
- Cameron Gliddon (born 1989), Australian basketball player
- George Gliddon (1809–1857), Anglo-American Egyptologist
- Katie Edith Gliddon (1883–1967), British watercolour artist and suffragette
- Jonathan Gliddon (born 1971), British Open Squash Masters Champion 2019
