= Harry Sawyer =

Harry Sawyer may refer to:

- Harry Sawyer (Australian rules footballer) (1895–1963)
- Harry Sawyer (soccer) (born 1996), Australian association footballer
- Harry William Sawyer (1880–1962), American physician and politician
- Harry Sawyer (mobster) (1890–1955), Jewish-American organized crime boss based in St. Paul, Minnesota

== See also ==
- Harry Sawyerr (1926–2013), Ghanaian politician
- Harry Sawyerr (theologian) (1909–1986), Sierra Leonean theologian
- Harold Sawyer (disambiguation)
