= Clohesy =

Clohesy is a surname. Notable people with the surname include:

- Alanna Clohesy (born 1962), Australian politician
- Bill Clohesy (1894–1945), Australian rules football player

== See also ==
- Clohessy
