= Eric Gordon (disambiguation) =

Eric Gordon (born 1988) is an American basketball player.

Eric Gordon may also refer to:

- Eric Gordon (American football) (born 1987), American football player in the Canadian Football League
- Eric Gordon (bishop) (1905–1992), Anglican bishop in England
- Eric Gordon (footballer) (1898–1981), Australian rules footballer
- Eric Gordon (racing driver) (born 1967), American racing driver
- E. V. Gordon (Eric Valentine Gordon, 1896–1938), Canadian philologist
- Eric Gordon, founder of the British newspaper Camden New Journal
- Eric A. Gordon, American biographer and cultural historian

== See also ==
- Erick Gordon, educator
- Eric G. Hall (Eric Gordon Hall, 1922–1998), air vice marshal in the Pakistan Air Force
