= Thomas Peterson =

Thomas Peterson or Tom Peterson may refer to:

- Thomas Peterson (politician), Utah state representative
- Thomas C. Peterson, American climatologist
- Thomas E. Petersen, Commissioner of the Minnesota Department of Agriculture
- Thomas Mundy Peterson (1824–1904), first African American to vote in an election under the U.S. Constitution
- Tom Peterson (1930–2016), American retailer, pitchman, and television personality
- Tom Peterson (cyclist) (born 1986), American professional road racing cyclist
- Tom Peterson (producer), Australian TV producer and director, director of Fisk
- Tommy Peterson (footballer) (1898–1950), Australian rules footballer

== See also ==
- Peterson (name)
- Thomas Ring Petersen (born 1980), better known as Thomas Ring, Danish singer
- Tom Petersson (born 1951), American musician, member of Cheap Trick
- Tom Pettersen (1935–1994), Norwegian swimmer
- Tom Pettersson (born 1990), Swedish footballer
