= Douglas Thomson =

Douglas Thomson may refer to:

- Dougie Thomson (born 1951), Scottish bass guitarist, formerly of the progressive rock band Supertramp
- Sir Douglas Thomson, 2nd Baronet (1905–1972), Scottish Unionist politician, Member of Parliament 1935–1946
- Doug Thomson (footballer) (1896–1959), Australian rules footballer
- Douglas Thomson (footballer) (born 1891), Scottish footballer

== See also ==
- Doug Thompson, mayor
