= 1918 VFL grand final =

Grand final of the 1918 Victorian Football League season

1918 VFL Grand Final
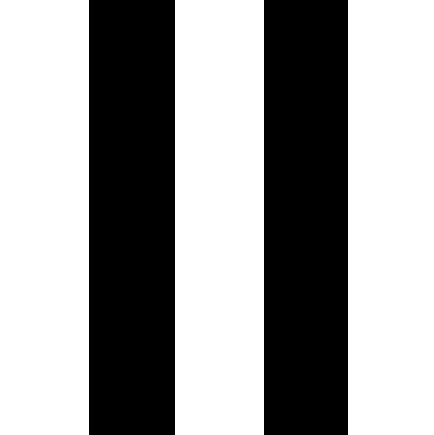

Collingwood	South Melbourne
7.15 (57)	9.8 (62)
	1	2	3	4
COL	3.3 (21)	4.9 (33)	7.12 (54)	7.15 (57)
SM	2.5 (17)	2.5 (17)	6.6 (42)	9.8 (62)
- Date: 7 September 1918
- Stadium: Melbourne Cricket Ground
- Attendance: 39,262

The 1918 VFL Grand Final was an Australian rules football game contested between the South Melbourne Football Club and Collingwood Football Club, held at the Melbourne Cricket Ground in Melbourne on 7 September 1918. It was the 21st annual Grand Final of the Victorian Football League, staged to determine the premiers for the 1918 VFL season. The match, attended by 39,262 spectators, was won by South Melbourne by a margin of 5 points, marking that club's second premiership victory.

== Right to challenge ==
This season was played under the amended Argus system. South Melbourne was the minor premier, and Collingwood had finished second. The teams both qualified for this match by winning their semi-finals matches.

If Collingwood had won this match, South Melbourne would have had the right to challenge Collingwood to a rematch for the premiership on the following weekend, because South was the minor premier. The winner of that match would then have won the premiership.

== Teams ==
S. Melbourne	Collingwood

South Melbourne
B:	Jim Graham	Chip Turner	Vic Belcher
HB:	Arthur Rademacher	Alan O'Donoghue	Bill Daly
C:	Mark Tandy	Tammy Hynes	Artie Wood
HF:	Jim Caldwell (c)	Tom O'Halloran	Harold Robertson
F:	Ernie Barber	Gerald Ryan	Chris Laird
Foll:	Jack Howell	Phil Skehan	Jock Doherty
Coach:	Henry Elms/Herb Howson		

Collingwood
B:	Maurie Sheehy	Harry Saunders	Alec Mutch
HB:	Bert Colechin	Con McCarthy	Charlie Brown
C:	Charlie Pannam	Percy Wilson (c)	Bill Twomey
HF:	Tom Wraith	Bill Walton	Jack Green
F:	Ernie Lumsden	Dick Lee	Gus Dobrigh
Foll:	Les Hughes	Pen Reynolds	Charlie Laxton
Coach:	Jock McHale		

- Umpire – Jack Elder

== Statistics ==
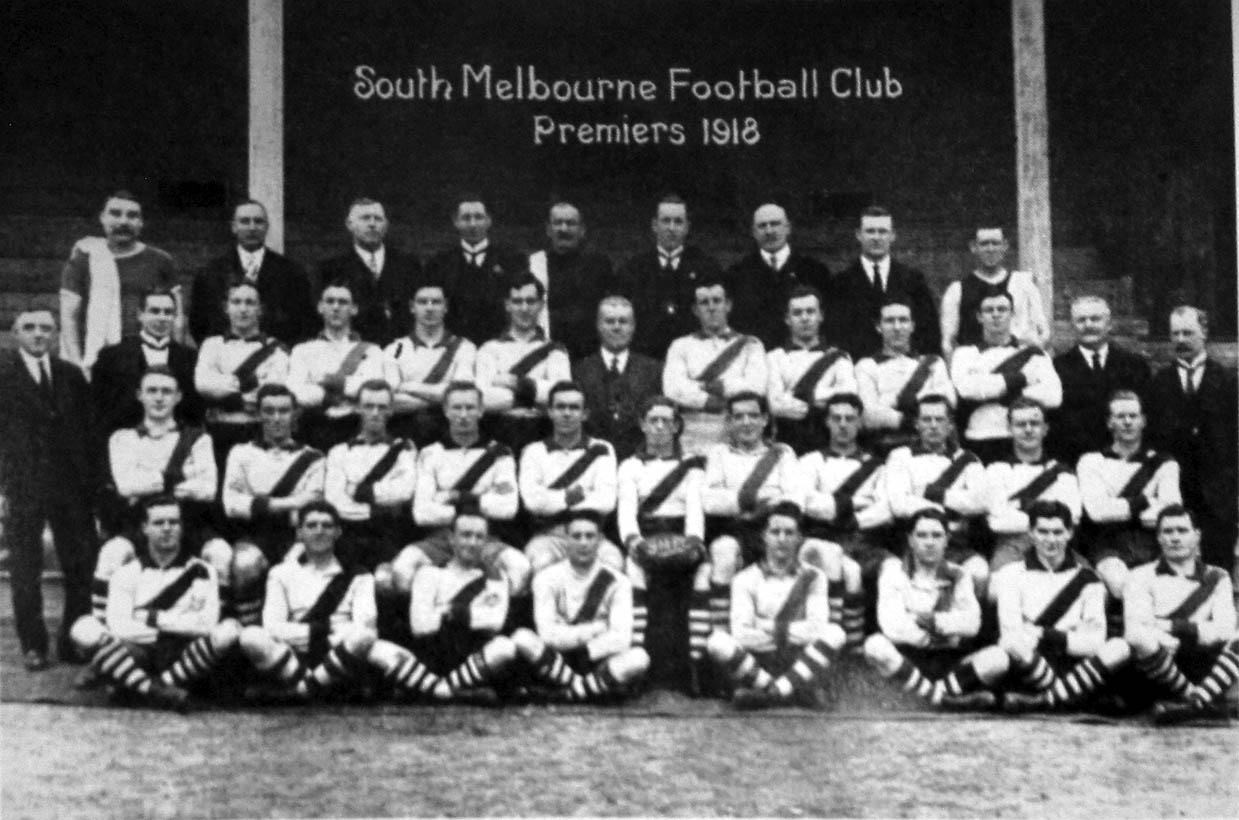
South Melbourne, Premiers

=== Goalkickers ===
South Melbourne:

- C Laird 3
- G Ryan 3
- H Robertson 2
- E Barber 1

Collingwood:

- D Lee 3
- E Lumsden 2
- L Hughes 1
- C Laxton 1

== See also ==
- 1918 VFL season
