= Murder of Keith William Allan =

Murder of Australian man

Keith Allan
- Born: Keith William Allan; 19 November 1946
- Died: c. 28 May 2000 (aged 53); Australia
- Cause of death: Murder
- Occupation: Solicitor

Keith William Allan (19 November 1946 – c. 28 May 2000) was an Australian solicitor, murdered in a contract killing. He was educated at Northcote High School and the University of Melbourne, where he completed the degree Bachelor of Laws. He practised as a solicitor at Avondale Heights, a western suburb of Melbourne located in the City of Moonee Valley. He was a cousin of Jacinta Allan, the Victorian premier from 2023 until 2026. He was also a cousin of former test cricketer Graham Yallop and former Australian rules footballers Ken Turner (Collingwood), Jamie Turner (Collingwood) and Max Oppy (Richmond).

== People involved with his murder ==
Three men — Sudo Cavkic, Costas Athanasi and Julian Michael Clarke — were tried and convicted for his murder after three trials before the Supreme Court of Victoria. Frank De Stefano, a former gambling associate of Clarke, gave evidence at each of the three trials, as did Jack Collins, Australian football great and personal friend of Allan. The case received considerable media coverage, particularly by the Geelong Advertiser, as Clarke was a former Geelong resident. This case is an example of a murder conviction without a body; the whereabouts of Allan's corpse remain unknown.

== Murder case ==
The Allan murder was a contract killing. The architect of his murder was Clarke, who was stealing substantial sums of money from the solicitor trust account of his employer Allan. The money stolen was largely gambled at Crown Casino, where Clarke was a devotee of the high roller Mahogany Room. Clarke gambled with former Geelong Mayor Frank De Stefano, whom he allowed to launder considerable money through the trust account, without Allan's knowledge.

The plan was for Allan to be executed, his body to be disposed of, and for him to be regarded as a missing person. Clarke paid Athanasi, an active drug dealer, about $93,000 to organise the murder. Athanasi then engaged his long-time friend Cavkic to actually carry it out. The plan almost succeeded but for two alert policemen, Senior Constables Michael Strongman and Travis McCarthy, who apprehended Cavkic driving Allan's car, a blue Mercedes Benz, in a dead end street at Altona Meadows, a western suburb of Melbourne.

The case is significant in Australian law in that it decided that beyond reasonable doubt should not be expressed as a percentage. In 2005 The Victorian Court of Appeal annulled the guilty verdict of the first trial in 2004 and ordered a retrial on the ground that the trial judge had failed to answer a question from a member of the jury asking if the term reasonable doubt could be expressed as a percentage.

The trial judge followed the judgement in Green v R, that judges should not explain to juries the meaning of reasonable doubt, that they should explain only in terms that beyond reasonable doubt is the highest standard of proof known to the law, or that further definition would be neither useful nor proper.

The Court of Appeal, in a judgement by Justices Vincent, Charles and Osborn, held that the trial judge should have explained to the jury that reasonable doubt was not a percentage, unlike the position in a civil rather than a criminal case where the standard of proof, the balance of probabilities, could be expressed as a percentage of greater than 51:49.

== Verdict ==
In 2006, the second trial resulted in a hung jury. In 2007, all three were again found guilty, and were sentenced by the trial judge, Justice Coldrey, to sentences that ranged from nineteen years to twenty-three and a half years. The Court of Appeal dismissed a further appeal in March 2009. Justices Virginia Bell and Susan Crennan of the High Court of Australia refused an application seeking special leave to appeal on 11 December 2009.

== See also ==
- List of solved missing person cases (post-2000)
