= Jim Caldwell (footballer) =

Australian rules footballer & coach (1888–1929)

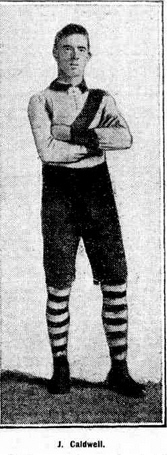
- Caldwell during his South Melbourne career

Personal information
- Full name: James McIlwrick Caldwell
- Nickname: Ginger
- Born: 11 August 1888; Williamstown, Victoria
- Died: 20 August 1929 (aged 41); East Melbourne, Victoria
- Original team: Williamstown CYMS (CYMSFA)
- Height: 173 cm (5 ft 8 in)
- Weight: 66 kg (146 lb)
- Position: Rover

Playing career^{1}
Years	Club	Games (Goals)
1907–08, 1920–22	Williamstown (VFA)	81
1909–19	South Melbourne	155 (34)
1920	Footscray Football Club (VFA)	
1923–24	Perth	13

Coaching career^{3}
Years	Club	Games (W–L–D)
1923–24	Perth	28 (4–23–1)
1925	Carlton	11 (4–7–0)
1929	South Melbourne	4 (1–3–0)
- ^{1} Playing statistics correct to the end of 1924.^{3} Coaching statistics correct as of 1929.

Career highlights
- South Melbourne premiership captain 1918; South Melbourne captain 1918–1919; Williamstown: Team of the Century

James McIlwrick "Ginger" Caldwell (11 August 1888 – 20 August 1929) was an Australian rules footballer who played with South Melbourne in the Victorian Football League (VFL).

== Family ==
The son of Thomas Caldwell and Agnes Caldwell (1854–1907), née Smith, he was born at Williamstown, Victoria, on 11 August 1888.

He married Clarissa Ann Hayes (1891–1967), the daughter of Richard and Elizabeth Hayes on 7 August 1912. They had two children, Edna May Caldwell (1913), and John Arthur Caldwell (1917–1987). He was also the brother-in-law of former Williamstown footballer "Jack" May, who married Clarissa's sister in 1917.

=== Siblings ===
He had nine brothers and sisters, including:

- Robert John Caldwell (1876–1927): Williamstown footballer.
- Thomas Campbell Caldwell (1879–1960): served in the First AIF, and was awarded the Military Medal in 1917.
- Arthur Edward Caldwell (1886–1915): St Kilda and Williamstown footballer, served in the First AIF; died of wounds sustained in action.
- Joseph Albury Caldwell (1893–1966): served in the First AIF.

== Football ==
=== Williamstown ===
Caldwell played his junior football with CYMS Football Association (CYMSFA) club Williamstown CYMS, Yarraville Juniors and Newport Juniors before commencing with Williamstown in the VFA in 1905. He played until 1908 and was a premiership player with Victorian Football Association (VFA) club Williamstown in 1907, the Club's first. He transferred to South Melbourne in 1909.

=== South Melbourne ===
In his debut season (1909), South Melbourne reached the Grand Final but Caldwell missed playing due to a nine-week suspension for striking Carlton's George Bruce in the Preliminary Final. Almost a decade later, in 1918, as captain-coach, he led the club to victory in the 1918. By then, Caldwell was playing as a rover and had become a regular Victorian interstate representative.

=== Footscray ===
Cleared from South Melbourne on 12 May 1920, he played three matches for Footscray in the VFA — on 15 May, 22 May, and 29 May — before resigning as a player and moving on to coach "Footscray Diggers", in the Victorian Junior Football Association; and, at least, by 31 July 1920, he was serving as captain-coach of Camperdown in the Corangamite Football Association.

=== Williamstown ===
Caldwell returned to captain-coach Williamstown In 1921 and 1922, and led them to a premiership in the former season. This meant Caldwell had played in both of Williamstown's first two premiership teams. In total, Caldwell played 81 games for 'Town, is a member of the WFC Hall of Fame and was selected on a wing in the WFC Team-of-the-Century.

=== Perth ===
Cleared from Williamstown on 25 April 1923, he captain-coached the Perth team in 1923 and 1924 "without much success"; and, in the second half of the 1923 season, "was disqualified for the [remainder of] the season for abusing a field-umpire".

=== Carlton ===
On the resignation of Carlton's captain-coach Paddy O'Brien — who (later) went to play with Footscray in its first VFL season — Ray Brew acted as coach for four matches. Caldwell (then in Perth) was appointed coached of Carlton for the remainder of the 1925 VFL season.

=== Rutherglen ===
Although offered another year at Carlton in 1926, Caldwell took up a more lucrative offer, and was appointed captain-coach of the Rutherglen Football Club in the Ovens and Murray Football League. Caldwell resigned as coach of Rutherglen in July, 1926. Due to financial considerations, the Rutherglen club not only decided not to appoint a playing coach for the 1927 season, but also decided not to appoint a paid coach at all.

=== South Melbourne ===
Caldwell was appointed South Melbourne coach for the 1929 VFL season; yet, despite the team's (unexpected) victory against Richmond on 1 June 1929, much dissatisfaction was expressed about Caldwell's coaching, and Caldwell was invited to resign, which he did, on the following Tuesday (4 June 1929).

== Death ==
Admitted to the Melbourne Hospital with "internal trouble", Jim Caldwell died of peritonitis some three weeks later, on 20 August 1929.

== See also ==
- List of Australian rules football families
