= Adlai E. Stevenson High School (New York City) =

Public school in New York City

Coordinates: 40°49′19″N 73°51′21″W

- 1980 Lafayette Avenue, the Bronx

Information
- Type: Public high school
- Closed: June, 2009
- School district: New York City Department of Education
- Principal: John Tornifolio
- Grades: 9 - 12
- Enrollment: 250
- Website: School website dead link

Adlai E. Stevenson High School was a New York City public high school located at 1980 Lafayette Avenue, in the Soundview section of the Bronx.

The New York City Department of Education closed the school in June 2009, owing to poor performance (high truancy, violence and a low graduation rate). New, specialty schools were created as part of the New Century Schools initiative. As of 2026, the high schools on the Stevenson Campus are:

- Bronx Community High School
- P17X at 452 (District 75 program)
- Bronx Bridges High School (X432)
- Millennium Art Academy (X312)
- Antonia Pantoja Preparatory Academy, A College Board School (grades 6-12) (X376)
- Gotham Collaborative High School (X452)
- Bronx Compass (X561)

== Notable alumni ==
- Winsome Earle-Sears - politician, Lieutenant Governor of Virginia
- Monique Holsey-Hyman – politician, social worker, and professor
- Ed Pinckney – (b 1963) former NBA basketball player for the Boston Celtics.
- Big Pun – (b 1971. d 2000) hip-hop artist and rapper

== See also ==
- List of high schools in New York City
