= Student Press Initiative =

The Student Press Initiative (SPI) at Teachers College, Columbia University
- Founded: 2002
- Founder: Erick Gordon
- Type: 501(c)(3)
- Purpose: Education
- Location: New York, NY
- Website: http://www.tc.edu/cpet

The Student Press Initiative (SPI) at Teachers College, Columbia University, is a professional development program for teachers, which uses publication as a tool to teach literacy skills. Publication, or "Going Public," entails everything from publishing professionally bound books of student writing and organizing community-based panel discussions to developing downloadable MP3s and staging theatrical performances. This not-for-profit educational organization partners with schools to transform classrooms into mini-publishing houses that celebrate student voice, activism and achievement. Founded in 2002, SPI provides intensive consultation and curriculum planning resources to classroom teachers in its partner schools, and publishes the culminating student-authored projects.

According to the organization’s website, SPI has partnered with over 60 schools over the past seven years. The goal of the partnerships is to link Teachers College resources with classrooms across the nation. Through these partnerships, SPI provides teachers with the tools and support they need to create projects that culminate in the publication of student-written books and teacher-written curriculum guides. SPI has published student-authored texts written across the disciplines, including math, science, English language Arts, ELL and bilingual studies. Over the years, the organization has hosted public performances of student work at various community venues, including Barnes & Noble and Borders bookstores, the Samsung Experience at the Time Warner Center in Manhattan, and the Rikers Island Correctional Facility. In 2008, SPI partner teachers received one of four Tribute WTC Visitor Center Annual Teacher Awards for the book Yesterday’s Issues, Today’s Perspectives, Tomorrow’s Lessons written by students from the Academy for Young Writers.

== History ==
The Student Press Initiative is a signature initiative of the Center for Professional Education of Teachers (CPET), a non-profit organization based out of Teachers College, Columbia University. SPI first took root in 2002 in the classroom of founder, Erick Gordon. Before completing his Masters in English Education at Teachers College, Gordon was a fiction writer and the founding editor of Underhouse in San Francisco's independent zine scene in the early 90s. Gordon later carried this spirit of self-publishing into his classroom at the New York City Lab School where he built Bag of Bees Press as a way to further the writing efforts of his students.

== Philosophy and tradition ==
The Student Press Initiative’s philosophy of project-based learning focuses on three key principals: genre study, writing for authentic audience, and community involvement and connection. SPI’s mission is to "...revolutionize education by advancing teacher leadership in reading and writing instruction,” according to its web site. The organization believes students become experts in a project’s central writing forms through immersion in genre study. Students read mentor texts, break the genre down into its components and, ultimately, craft pieces that represent their learning and culminate in the publication of their original writing.

SPI follows in the footsteps of educators such as James Moffett, Peter Elbow, Ken Macrorie, Eliot Wigginton, and Ruth Vinz, who have long advocated for celebrating student voice and writing with rhetorical purpose. In keeping with this tradition, SPI believes curriculum-based publications that "grow from highly specified genre studies in the classroom not only democratize students' opportunities to publish, but also provide opportunities to link content-area reading and writing skill development with the excitement of real-world learning."

== Past and present partner schools ==
- Academy for Young Writers
- Beacon High School
- Banana Kelly High School
- Bayard Rustin Educational Complex
- Art and Music Academy
- Math and Science Academy
- Institute for Media and Writing
- International School of Business
- Brooklyn Community Arts & Media High School
- Brooklyn Lab School
- Brooklyn Preparatory High School
- DeWitt Clinton High School
- Excelsior Preparatory High School
- Foundations Academy
- Hempstead High School
- Heritage High School
- Hoboken/A.J. Demerest High School
- Holcombe L Rucker School of Community Research
- Horizon Academy at Rikers Island
- Long Creek Detention Center, ME
- Long Island City High School
- Manhattan Business Academy
- Millennium Art Academy
- New York City Lab School for Collaborative Studies
- Pablo Neruda Academy
- Queens Preparatory High School
- Rose M. Singer Center
- University of Sarajevo, Bosnia
