= Jack Howell (footballer) =

Australian rules footballer and coach

Personal information
- Full name: John Edmund Howell
- Born: 31 August 1924; Spotswood, Victoria
- Died: 12 June 1994 (aged 69)
- Original team: Chelsea
- Debut: 16 May 1942, Carlton vs. South Melbourne, at Princes Park
- Height: 192 cm (6 ft 4 in)
- Weight: 91 kg (201 lb)

Playing career^{1}
| Years | Club | Games (Goals) |
| 1942–1954 | Carlton | 137 (246) |
| 1954–1956 | Oakleigh (VFA) | 34 (49) |
- ^{1} Playing statistics correct to the end of 1954.

Career highlights
- Carlton best and fairest: 1946 & 1948; Carlton premiership player: 1947; Carlton leading goalkicker: 1952 (42); All-Australian team 1953; Carlton Hall of Fame: 1991 inductee

John Edmund "Chooka" Howell (31 August 1924 – 12 June 1994), nicknamed "Chooka" (as was his father) from his distinctive gait, was an Australian rules footballer in the Victorian Football League (VFL).

== Three generations of grand final players ==
He has the distinction of being a member of the only three-generation set of participants in a VFL/AFL Grand Final.

His father Jack P. "Chooka" Howell played for South Melbourne, against Collingwood, in the 1918 Grand Final.

This Jack "Chooka" Howell played for Carlton, against Essendon, in the 1947 Grand Final.

His son, Scott Howell played for Carlton, against Collingwood, in the 1981 Grand Final.
