= Keily =

Keily is an English surname. Notable people with this surname include:

- Arthur Keily (1921–2016), British marathon runner
- Dan Keily (1892–1967), Australian Australian rules football player
- Jack Keily (1898–1966), Australian Australian rules football player
- John Keily (1854–1928), Irish Catholic prelate
