= Ernie Barber =

Ernie Barber may refer to:

- Ernie Barber (American football) (1914–1989), American football center
- Ernie Barber (Australian footballer) (1895–1972), Australian rules footballer
