= Doug Thomson =

Doug Thomson may refer to:

- Dougie Thomson (born 1951), Scottish musician
- Doug Thomson (footballer) (1896–1959), Australian rules footballer
