= William Daly =

William Daly may refer to:

- William Davis Daly (1851–1900), American congressman from New Jersey
- William Merrigan Daly (1887–1936), musician
- William Daly (hurler) (1877–?), Irish hurler
- William T. Daly, educator and American football and baseball player and coach
- William Robert Daly (1871–?), actor and director of silent films
- Will H. Daly (1869–1924), American labor leader based in Oregon State
- Bill Daly (born 1964), Deputy Commissioner of the National Hockey League
- Bill Daly (footballer) (1892–1980), Australian rules footballer
- Will Daly (rower) (born 1983), American lightweight rower
- Willie John Daly (1925–2017), Irish hurler and coach

== See also ==
- William Daley (disambiguation)
- William Daily (disambiguation)
- William Dailey (disambiguation)
