= Frank De Stefano =

Australian criminal

- Born: 1948
- Occupations: Accountant, mayor
- Conviction: Theft
- Penalty: 10 years imprisonment

Frank De Stefano (born 1948) was mayor and councillor of Geelong, Victoria from 1983 to 1993. In 1988 De Stefano was awarded the Order of Australia medal for his services to migrant communities. De Stefano resigned from the Order on 2 October 2008. In 2003 he was sentenced to ten years in prison on twelve theft charges totalling A$8,606,101.47.

== $8.6 million theft ==
De Stefano operated an accountancy business in Geelong from 1978 until 19 April 2000, when he was asked to report to the Geelong police station. He cooperated with police and detailed his theft of approximately $8 million from clients.

De Stefano was bailed, and on 13 March 2003, later appeared in the Supreme Court of Victoria for sentencing where he was sentenced to 10 years imprisonment with a minimum period of seven years. Some of those he stole from included Tomislav Papic, a quadriplegic who was awarded a record A$6 million settlement in a successful lawsuit against the Geelong Hospital. Justice Kellam referred to the thefts of Papic's compensation payout as "heartless", saying at De Stefano's sentencing hearing,

The theft of $4.98 million from Nexus (Geelong) Pty Ltd is particularly callous and cruel. It was a gross breach of the trust reposed in you. You met with Tomislav Papic on numerous occasions. There can be no doubt that you, at all times, were fully aware of the nature of the grievous injuries from which he suffered and the fact that he required the funds achieved by him as compensation for his horrendous accident to achieve any degree of independence and dignity. The theft by you of his funds took away his independence. Clearly, that must have been known by you. Your conduct in relation to this count was in my view heartless. Tomislav Papic died in October 2001. The victim impact statement filed by his father sets out clearly the trauma that he and his family suffered by reason of your theft. I have no difficulty in accepting the statement of his father that the period of time between April 2000 and the time of his death was a "nightmare" for both Tomislav Papic and his parents.

De Stefano gambled approximately A$6.6 million during many visits to Crown Casino in Melbourne and spending the remainder (approx. A$1.5 million) on personal expenses, including travel, renovations on his Eastern Beach (Geelong) home and donations to the Liberal Party.

De Stefano was charged with twelve charges of theft. He admitted to all counts, totalling over $8 million from clients as follows:

- $4,980,175.07, belonging to company Nexus (Geelong) Pty Ltd, a trust set up to manage the affairs of quadriplegic Tomislav Papic
- $1,450,000, belonging to Global Issues Pty Ltd
- $575,307.77, belonging to Norman Williams
- $400,000, belonging to Javni Homes (Geelong) Pty Ltd
- $309,418.89, belonging to investors Mr and Mrs Farey
- $250,000, belonging to Francesco Mazza
- $245,000, belonging to Donna Murdoch
- $150,000, belonging to Basil's Plasterers Pty Ltd
- $100,000, belonging to Bendiwi Pty Ltd
- $92,081.21, belonging to K.L. Consultancy Pty Ltd
- $40,464.06, belonging to Popular Pastimes Pty Ltd
- $13,654.47, belonging to Wingrove Pty Ltd

Frank Costa, who was the Geelong Football Club president at the time, described De Stefano as a hero to Geelong's Italian community, saying:

"He was a fellow who did an awful lot of very, very good community work in Geelong, that's why it was such as shock to everybody. He was heavily involved in many forms of community support. He was on the council for many years, he was Mayor, he did an awful lot for migrants coming into Geelong."

De Stefano was released into home detention in July 2009. His victims were repaid "substantial sums" by Crown Casino as the casino had knowingly accepted stolen funds.

== Witness in murder trial ==
De Stefano gave evidence on four occasions as a witness in the committal and trials of law clerk Julian Michael Clarke in the murder of Keith William Allan. The first occasion was the committal of Clarke at the Melbourne Magistrates Court before Magistrate Barbara Cottrell on 3 July 2003. The other occasions were during Clarke's three trials in the Supreme Court of Victoria. These were at the first trial before Justice Philip Cummins on 1 March 2004, the second trial before Justice David Byrne on 15 May 2006, and the third trial before Justice John Coldrey on 2 April 2007.

Clarke was one of three persons convicted for murdering Allan at the first and third trials. The verdict at the first trial was annulled by the Victorian Court of Appeal, owing to a legal technicality. The second trial was aborted due to a hung jury. Clarke and the other accused were again found guilty at the third trial. Appeals subsequent to this were all unsuccessful. Allan was murdered in May 2000, and his body has never been found.

De Stefano told the jury during cross-examination at each trial that he was borrowing large sums of money from Clarke to feed his own gambling addiction, and had met Clarke when frequenting the Crown Casino high rollers room. He said all loans from Clarke were repaid within 24 hours. David Pearson, forensic accountant with the Victoria Police Major Fraud Group, told the jury that De Stefano was laundering money via Clarke using a series of round-robin financial transactions channelled through Allan's trust account totalling $3.75 million. These funds were eventually converted into cheques payable to Crown Casino. Much of the money laundered had been replaced, but $140,000 lent to De Stefano was still outstanding.
