= Jock Doherty =

Australian rules footballer (1894–1957)

Personal information
- Full name: Jock Doherty
- Born: 3 October 1894
- Died: 15 June 1957 (aged 62)
- Original team: North Melbourne Juniors

Playing career^{1}
Years	Club	Games (Goals)
1915–1922	South Melbourne	67 (37)
1925	North Melbourne	4 (3)
Total		71 (40)
- ^{1} Playing statistics correct to the end of 1925.

Jock Doherty (3 October 1894 – 15 June 1957) was an Australian rules footballer who played with South Melbourne and North Melbourne in the Victorian Football League (VFL).

Doherty, who was blind in one eye, played as a rover in the South Melbourne team which won the 1918 VFL Grand Final.

Doherty was captain-coach of Ganmain Football Club in the South West Football League (New South Wales) in 1923. Doherty played with Ganmain FC in their losing 1924 grand final loss to Narrandera.

Having earlier been a North Melbourne junior, Doherty returned to the club as they prepared for their inaugural VFL season in 1925. He participated in their first ever league game, kicking two goals to help North Melbourne defeat Geelong by eight points. Out of all North Melbourne players that day he was the second most experienced and one of just four footballers who had previously played VFL football.
