= William Dailey =

William Dailey may refer to:

- William Dailey of the Fitz Hugh Ludlow Memorial Library
- Will Dailey
- Bill Dailey
- Rev. William R. "Bill" Dailey, C.S.C., former Pastoral Resident in Christie Hall at the University of Portland

== See also ==
- William Daily (disambiguation)
- William Daly (disambiguation)
- William Daley (disambiguation)
