= William Daily =

William Daily may refer to:

- William Mitchel Daily (1812–1877), third president of Indiana University
- Bill Daily (1927–2018), American comedian and actor

== See also ==
- William Daley (disambiguation)
- William Daly (disambiguation)
- William Dailey (disambiguation)
