= William Daley =

William or Bill Daley may refer to:

- Bill Daley (American football) (1919–2015), American football player
- Bill Daley (baseball) (1868–1922), American baseball player
- William Daley (Australian politician) (1870–1944), New South Wales politician
- William Daley (ceramist) (1925–2022), American ceramist and professor
- William M. Daley (born 1948), American politician from Illinois, former White House Chief of Staff
- William R. Daley (1892–1971), American baseball executive
- Billy Silverman (William Daley, born 1962), American wrestling referee

== See also ==
- William Daly (disambiguation)
- William Daily (disambiguation)
- William Dailey (disambiguation)
