= Arthur Caldwell (Australian footballer) =

Australian rules footballer (1886–1915)

Personal information
- Full name: Arthur Edward Caldwell
- Born: 23 February 1886; Young, New South Wales
- Died: 26 July 1915 (aged 29); Valletta, Malta
- Original team: Williamstown (VFA)

Playing career^{1}
Years	Club	Games (Goals)
1909	St Kilda	8 (1)
- ^{1} Playing statistics correct to the end of 1909.

Arthur Edward Caldwell (23 February 1886 – 26 July 1915) was an Australian rules footballer who played for the St Kilda Football Club in the Victorian Football League (VFL).

He served overseas in the First AIF. He was badly wounded in action at Gallipoli on 14 July 1915, and died of his wounds on 18 July 1915.

== Family ==
The son of Thomas Caldwell and Agnes Caldwell (1854–1907), née Smith, Arthur Edward Caldwell was born at Young, New South Wales on 23 February 1886.

=== Siblings ===
He had nine brothers and sisters, including:

- Robert John Caldwell (1876–1927): Williamstown footballer.
- Thomas Campbell Caldwell (1879–1960): served in the First AIF, and was awarded the Military Medal in 1917.
- James McIlwrick Caldwell (1888–1929): South Melbourne, Williamstown, Footscray (VFA), and Perth footballer.
- Joseph Albury Caldwell (1893–1966): served in the First AIF.

== Football ==
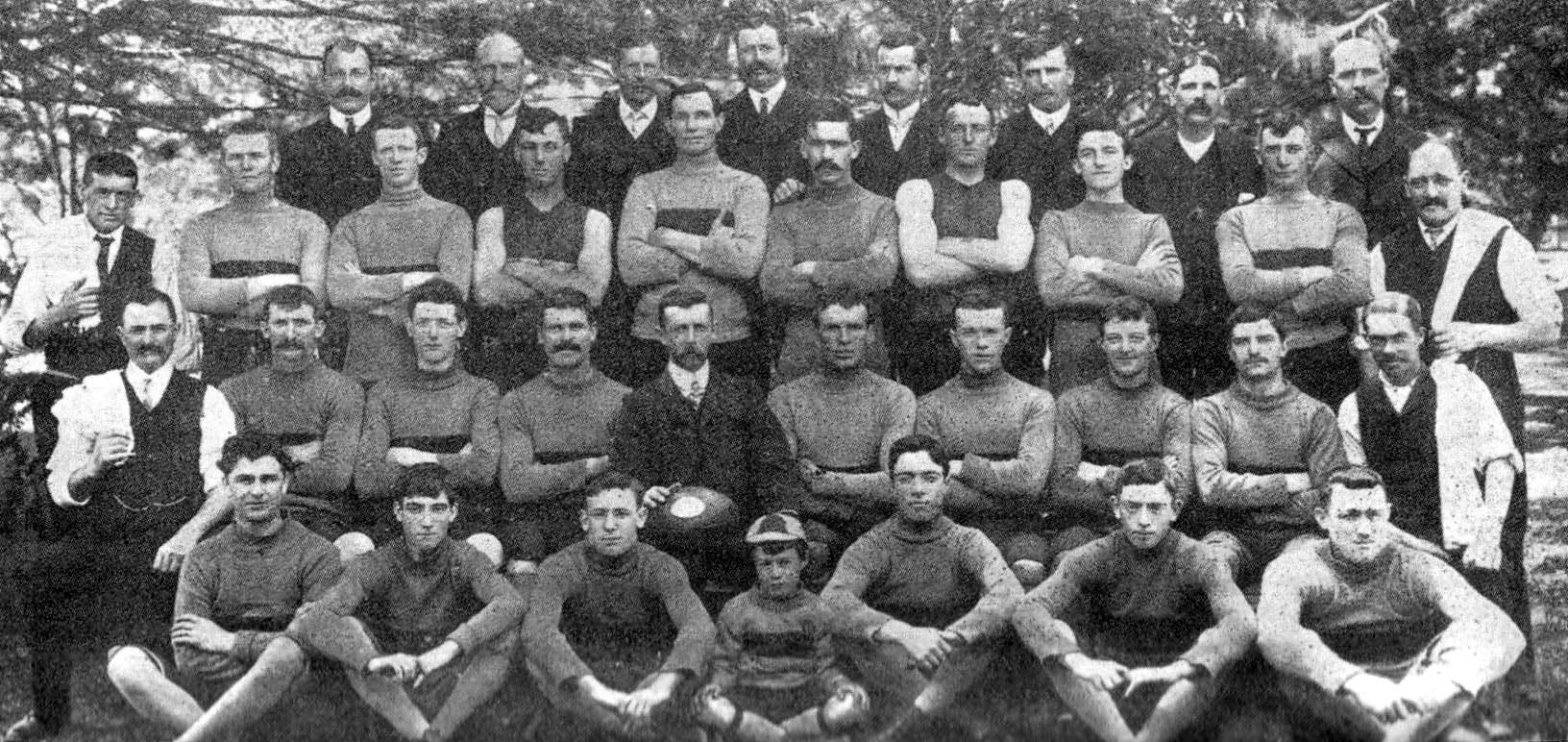
The Williamstown Football Team (VFA premiers, 1907). Arthur Caldwell is cross-legged, second from left, front row. Jim Caldwell (also cross-legged) second from right, front row.

=== Williamstown (VFA) ===
He played 84 games for Williamstown in the Victorian Football Association (VFA) over eight seasons (1902 to 1910).

In the Final match of the 1907 VFA season, played on 28 September 1907, in which Williamstown won the VFA Premiership, 7.10 (52), against West Melbourne 3.15 (34), Arthur Caldwell played on one wing, and his brother, Jim, played on the other.

=== St Kilda (VFL) ===
Caldwell made his debut for St Kilda in the 1909 VFL season, playing eight games.

== Military service ==
Employed as a compositor for the Williamstown Advertiser, Caldwell enlisted in the Australian Imperial Forces (AIF) at the beginning of World War I, served in the 4th Battalion and was sent overseas to Gallipoli.

== Death ==
After being severely wounded (gunshot wounds in spine and arm) on 14 July 1915 in the fighting at Gallipoli, Caldwell was evacuated to Malta on 18 July 1915.

He died in a military hospital in Valletta on 26 July 1915.

He is buried at the Addolorata Cemetery, in Malta.

== See also ==
- List of Victorian Football League players who died on active service
- List of Australian rules football families
