= George Hemingway (footballer) =

Australian rules footballer

Personal information
- Full name: George Walter John Hemingway
- Born: 8 August 1900; Ascot Vale, Victoria
- Died: 9 April 1975 (aged 74); Kogarah, New South Wales

Playing career^{1}
| Years | Club | Games (Goals) |
| 1918 | Essendon | 1 (0) |
- ^{1} Playing statistics correct to the end of 1918.

George Walter John Hemingway (8 August 1900 – 9 April 1975) was an Australian rules footballer who played with Essendon in the Victorian Football League (VFL).

After playing his one game for Essendon in the 1918 VFL season, in October 1918 Hemingway enlisted in the Australian Imperial Force but the War ended before he served.
