= Tammy Hynes =

Australian rules footballer

Personal information
- Born: 11 August 1897
- Died: 9 September 1969 (aged 72)
- Original team: Middle Park
- Height: 175 cm (5 ft 9 in)
- Weight: 78 kg (172 lb)

Playing career^{1}
Years	Club	Games (Goals)
1918–1924	South Melbourne	57 (4)
- ^{1} Playing statistics correct to the end of 1924.

Tammy Hynes (11 August 1897 – 9 September 1969) was an Australian rules footballer who played with South Melbourne in the Victorian Football League (VFL).

Hynes was a member of South Melbourne's 1918 premiership team, in his debut season. A centreman, Hynes retired in 1924 after 57 league games. His grandson Tom played for South Melbourne during the 1960s.
