= Harold Sawyer =

Harold Sawyer may refer to:

- Harold S. Sawyer (1920–2003), American attorney and politician from Michigan
- Harold E. Sawyer (1890–1969), American prelate

== See also ==
- Harry Sawyer (disambiguation)
