= Stan Yates =

Australian rules footballer, born 1900

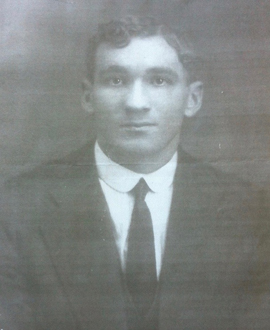
- Yates in 1918

Personal information
- Full name: Stanley Lancelot Yates
- Born: 6 June 1900; Bendigo, Victoria
- Died: 28 December 1980 (aged 80); Heidelberg, Victoria
- Original team: Anchor Stars
- Height: 179 cm (5 ft 10 in)
- Weight: 89 kg (196 lb)

Playing career^{1}
Years	Club	Games (Goals)
1918	Collingwood	8 (6)
1925	Richmond	5 (0)
Total		13 (6)
- ^{1} Playing statistics correct to the end of 1925.

Stanley Lancelot Yates (6 June 1900 – 28 December 1980) was a former Australian rules footballer who played with Collingwood and Richmond in the Victorian Football League (VFL).

Yates continued his football career at Northcote in the Victorian Football Association and finally as playing Captain Coach ad Fairfield FC, taking them to a premiership in 1926.

Yates enlisted in the Royal Australian Air Force (RAAF) on 5 May 1942 and served as a corporal in 1 Stores Depot in Port Melbourne until his discharge on 19 October 1945.

Yates's nephew is Ken Turner, who played in Collingwood's 1958 Premiership team and Ken's son Jamie Turner was part of the 1990 Collingwood premiership team. Another nephew of Stan's is Graeme Yallop an Australian cricket captain.

Stan normally played as a ruckman, one of the original Collingwood 6 footers.
