= Erick Gordon =

Director of the Student Press Initiative

Erick Gordon is the Founding Director of the Student Press Initiative (SPI) at Teachers College, Columbia University, a professional development program for teachers whose mission is to turn writing instruction into inquiry-driven projects that culminate in student publication.

== Biography ==
=== Education ===
Gordon received his Ed.D. in English Education from Teachers College, Columbia University. His scholarly interests include the teaching of writing and composing processes, genre theory, as well as teacher preparation and the professional education of teachers.

=== Career ===
Dr. Erick Gordon is a writer, educator and social entrepreneur. He is founding director of Student Press Initiative at Teachers College, Columbia University and the former director of the New York City Writing Project. He comes from a background in small press publication that later led to classroom teaching, first in Northern California and then New York City. He was a full-time lecturer in the Teaching of English Master’s Program at Teachers College, where he also earned his doctorate in English Education.

Prior to attending Teachers College for his master's degree in English Education, Gordon founded the prose and poetry serial "Underhouse," in San Francisco’s independent zine scene in the early 1990s. He continued building self-publishing efforts as a teacher at the New York City Lab School, where he built Bag of Bees Press as a way to further the writing efforts of his students. He is now teaching English at Credo High School in Rohnert Park, California.

Over the last 25 years, Gordon has worked on student press literacy projects and helped support thousands of young authors into print.

=== Student Press Initiative ===
With lessons gained from his work with the NYC Lab School about rhetorical purpose and the importance of the writer’s audience, Gordon founded the Student Press Initiative (SPI), in 2002. SPI is a non-profit, professional development organization that provides resources for teachers to take their students' work public. Some 10,000 students and 1,500 teachers have worked with SPI to publish over 450 books within the last seventeen years.

== Selected publications ==
=== Books ===
- Gordon, E. (2016). Teaching the social entrepreneurs of tomorrow. In Bloom, M., Gullotta, T. P., & Greenberg, A. (Eds.), Social capital and community well-being: The serve here initiative. New York, NY: Springer.
- Ruth Vinz with Erick Gordon, et al. (2000). Becoming (Other)wise: Enhancing critical reading perspectives. Portland, Me: Calendar Island.

=== Articles ===
- (2015) Gordon, E., & Vinz, R. "Provocation in the company of others: Learning through improvisational spaces." Teachers College Record, 117(10), 222-237.
- (2007) Gordon, E., McKibbin, K., Vasudevan, L., & Vinz, R. "Writing Out of the Unexpected: Narrative Inquiry and The Weight of Small Moments." English Education. 39(4), 326-351.
- (2007). "Raising the bar for classroom publication: Building a student press initiative." English Journal.
- (2006). "Speaking writing: Publishing oral histories with incarcerated students." Teachers & Writers Magazine. 37(5).
- (2005). "A growing sense of audience: The power of curriculum-based publication." Teachers & Writers Magazine. 37(2).
- (2004). "Getting fired up!" English Journal. 96(3).94(1).
