= Chris Laird =

Australian rules footballer

Personal information
- Full name: Charles Norman Laird
- Born: 20 May 1893; Ballarat, Victoria
- Died: 14 December 1968 (aged 75); South Melbourne, Victoria
- Original team: Paddington
- Height: 180 cm (5 ft 11 in)
- Weight: 73 kg (161 lb)

Playing career^{1}
Years	Club	Games (Goals)
1918–1922	South Melbourne	59 (99)
- ^{1} Playing statistics correct to the end of 1922.

Charles Norman Laird (20 May 1893 – 14 December 1968) was an Australian rules footballer who played for South Melbourne in the Victorian Football League (VFL).

Laird spent five seasons with South Melbourne and is best known for his performance in the 1918 VFL Grand Final. Playing in the forward pocket, Laird kicked three goals in the match including the match winner in the final minute when he soccered the ball through for a goal. Earlier in the season, Laird kicked three goals in the last five minutes of the match to help South Melbourne defeat Carlton Football Club.

His twin brother Frank Laird also played for South Melbourne.

== Sources ==
- Atkinson, G. (1982) Everything you ever wanted to know about Australian rules football but couldn't be bothered asking, The Five Mile Press: Melbourne. ISBN 0 86788 009 0.
