= Phil Skehan =

Australian rules footballer

Personal information
- Full name: Philip Skehan
- Born: 21 June 1894; South Melbourne, Victoria
- Died: 17 June 1921 (aged 26); East Melbourne, Victoria
- Original team: Middle Park

Playing career^{1}
Years	Club	Games (Goals)
1917–1919	South Melbourne	38 (2)
- ^{1} Playing statistics correct to the end of 1919.

Philip Skehan (21 June 1894 – 17 June 1921) was an Australian rules footballer who played with South Melbourne in the Victorian Football League (VFL).

Skehan played as a follower and was recruited to South Melbourne from Middle Park. A butcher by profession, he was a member of the South Melbourne team which defeated Collingwood in the 1918 VFL Grand Final. His last game for South Melbourne was a semi final in 1919 and he was then sacked by the club after a dispute with the committee.

He hoped to continue playing football with Williamstown in the Victorian Football Association and on Wednesday 8 June 1921 was given a permit to transfer from South Melbourne.

The subsequent weekend, he made his debut for Williamstown in a fixture against Essendon Association and in the first half was involved in a collision with an opponent, with both of them going for the ball. The Essendon player was able to continue the game after being treated but Skehan suffered serious concussion and had a broken right leg below the knee. He would die in hospital six days later, due to hypostatic pneumonia and concussion of the brain.

He is believed to be the first VFL footballer to have lost his life as a result of an on-field injury and his death came just over a month before a similar tragedy, when Carlton rover Lyle Downs died of a heart attack in the club's training rooms.
