= Joe Rahilly =

Australian rules footballer

Personal information
- Full name: Joseph Alphonsus Rahilly
- Born: 22 June 1896; Carlton North, Victoria
- Died: 28 October 1964 (aged 68); South Melbourne, Victoria
- Original team: Sandringham (VFA)
- Position: Forward

Playing career^{1}
Years	Club	Games (Goals)
1918	St Kilda	4 (2)
- ^{1} Playing statistics correct to the end of 1918.

Joseph Alphonsus Rahilly (22 June 1896 – 28 October 1964) was an Australian rules footballer who played with St Kilda in the Victorian Football League (VFL).
