= Ken Turner (Australian footballer) =

Australian rules footballer (1935–2022)

Personal information
- Born: 30 June 1935
- Died: 11 February 2022 (aged 86)
- Original team: Collingwood Tech
- Height: 178 cm (5 ft 10 in)
- Weight: 76 kg (168 lb)

Playing career^{1}
Years	Club	Games (Goals)
1956–1965	Collingwood	170 (56)
- ^{1} Playing statistics correct to the end of 1965.

Ken Turner (30 June 1935 – 11 February 2022) was an Australian rules footballer who played with Collingwood in the VFL. He is the father of Australian Rules footballer Jamie Turner, who also played with Collingwood. He was a cousin of former test cricketer Graham Yallop, nephew of Stan Yates and was a cousin of murdered lawyer Keith William Allan.

Turner usually played on either the half forward flank or as a wingman. He was a member of Collingwood's premiership side in 1958 and represented Victoria at interstate football seven times during his career.

== See also ==
- Australian football at the 1956 Summer Olympics
