= Clohessy =

Clohessy is a surname. The name itself is an anglicized form of the Gaelic "Ó Clochasaigh," derived from the Gaelic word "cloch" meaning "stone."

Notable people with the surname include:

- David Clohessy (born c. 1956), once-Roman Catholic American activist
- Paddy Clohessy (1908–1971), Irish sportsperson and Fianna Fáil politician
- Pat Clohessy, (1933–2026) Australian runner and distance running coach
- Peadar Clohessy (1933–2014), Irish Fianna Fáil and Progressive Democrats politician
- Peter Clohessy (born 1966), Irish rugby union footballer
- Robert Clohessy (born 1958), American actor, played Sean Murphy on the HBO drama Oz
- Seán Clohessy (1931–2019), Irish hurler
- Sean Clohessy (born 1986), English professional footballer for Conference side Salisbury City
