= Jack P. Howell =

Australian rules footballer and coach

Jack Howell

Personal information
- Full name: John Patrick Howell
- Born: 16 March 1895; Carlton North, Victoria
- Died: 2 August 1971 (aged 76); Preston, Victoria
- Original team: Melbourne District

Playing career^{1}
Years	Club	Games (Goals)
1915–1918	South Melbourne	40 (22)
1919–1924	Footscray (VFA)	80 (43)
1925	Prahran (VFA)	6 (1)
- ^{1} Playing statistics correct to the end of 1925.

John Patrick "Chooka" Howell (16 March 1895 – 2 August 1971) was an Australian rules footballer who played with South Melbourne in the VFL. He is the father of Carlton Hall of Famer and premiership player Jack Howell.

Howell was a tireless ruckman who played his first game for South Melbourne in 1915. The club didn't play in the following season due to the war but he returned to the club in 1917. The 1918 season was his finest, his final game in the VFL being that year's grand final win over Collingwood. He then joined Footscray who were competing in the VFA. He played for Footscray from 1919 to 1924, moving to Prahran, as captain-coach, in 1925. He was replaced as coach before the end of the season.

== Three generations of Grand Final players ==
He has the distinction of being a member of the only three-generation set of participants in a VFL/AFL Grand Final.

- He played for South Melbourne, against Collingwood, in the 1918 VFL Grand Final.
- His son, Jack E. "Chooka" Howell played for Carlton, against Essendon, in the 1947 VFL Grand Final.
- His grandson, Scott Howell played for Carlton, against Collingwood, in the 1981 VFL Grand Final.
