= Bill Hannan =

Australian rules footballer

Personal information
- Full name: William Joseph Hannan
- Born: 3 January 1899; Seymour, Victoria
- Died: 11 March 1967 (aged 68); South Melbourne, Victoria
- Original team: Prahran District

Playing career^{1}
Years	Club	Games (Goals)
1918–19, 1921	St Kilda	29 (0)
- ^{1} Playing statistics correct to the end of 1921.

William Joseph Hannan (3 January 1899 – 11 March 1967) was an Australian rules footballer who played with St Kilda in the Victorian Football League (VFL).
