= Scott Howell (footballer) =

Australian rules footballer

Personal information
- Born: 10 May 1958 (age 68)
- Original team: East Sandringham
- Debut: Semi Final, 1980, Carlton vs. Collingwood, at the MCG
- Height: 193 cm (6 ft 4 in)
- Weight: 86 kg (190 lb)

Playing career^{1}
Years	Club	Games (Goals)
1980–1985	Carlton	39 (12)
1986-1988	Sandringham	28 (35)
Total		67 (47)
- ^{1} Playing statistics correct to the end of 1985.

Scott Howell (born 10 May 1958) is a former Australian rules footballer who played with Carlton in the VFL during the early 1980s.

Howell debuted for Carlton in the 1980 finals series and played in Carlton's premiership team the following season. This created history by completing three premierships in successive generations for the Howells with his father 'Chooka' Howell and grandfather Jack P. Howell both being premiership players.

He played with Sandringham after leaving Carlton.
