= Jim Graham (footballer) =

Australian rules footballer

Personal information
- Full name: James W. Graham
- Born: 17 April 1892
- Died: 28 November 1957 (aged 65)
- Original team: Williamstown Juniors

Playing career^{1}
| Years | Club | Games (Goals) |
| 1918 | South Melbourne | 15 (0) |
- ^{1} Playing statistics correct to the end of 1918.

James Graham (17 April 1892 – 28 November 1957) was an Australian rules footballer who played with South Melbourne in the Victorian Football League (VFL).

Graham spent just one season at South Melbourne, after coming to the club from Williamstown Juniors. He was, however, a member of a South Melbourne premiership team, playing as a back pocket defender in the 1918 VFL Grand Final.

He later played for Port Melbourne in the Victorian Football Association.
