= Millennium Art Academy =

Public school in New York City

Location
- 1980 Lafayette Ave; Bronx, NY 10469
- Coordinates: 40°50′26″N 73°50′21″W

Information
- Type: Public
- Established: 2003
- School district: 08
- Principal: Herman Guy
- Grades: 9 - 12
- Enrollment: 312
- Phone: 718-824-0978

Millennium Art Academy (M.A.A) first opened its doors in September 2003 in the Bronx. Originally located on the Herbert H. Lehman Educational Campus the academy moved after its first year to the Adlai E. Stevenson Campus. It is one of six small schools located on the Stevenson campus and enjoys the highest daily attendance rate of all - 92%.

Its founder and former principal, Maxine Nodel, a graduate of Cooper Union, former student of Beat poet Allen Ginsberg, and children's author who has written educational material for the Children's Television Workshop, was named one of New York City's top principals when she was awarded a Cahn Fellowship Award for Distinguished Principals at Columbia Teacher's College in 2005. M.A.A received an award for excellence in intergenerational education from Edwin Méndez-Santiago, Commissioner of the New York City Department for the Aging, at the Loeb Boat House in Central Park in June 2005.

M.A.A has appeared in The New York Times, on CBS evening news, ABC evening news on a documentary with Art Mcfarland, and in numerous publications. Millennium Art Academy is one of many small schools established to help create a better school system in which students receive a better education through smaller classes, a high-expectations learning environment, and an intensive student support.

Aside from being a small school, M.A.A has many unconventional programs such as The Millennium Pearl Initiative (M.P.I. Intergenerational Program), the Intergenerational Program (I.W.S.P), Art Portfolio, as well as Advanced Placement World History, a college-level mythology course, mosaic Club, Salsa Club, Chess class, S.A.T. prep, Saturday and P.M. school for struggling learners, as well as art shows throughout the year (including Sotheby's) to showcase student artwork. Also, with the help of the Student Press Initiative (S.P.I) at Teacher's College, M.A.A students have been able to publish two books ("Back In The Day 1 and 2") in accordance with the M.P.I program and have public book readings at a Barnes & Noble Bookstore. In June 2008, MAA students wrote and produced an original play that was performed on Broadway as part of Fidelity Bank's LEAP (Learning through an Expanded Arts Program).

At a school where 90% of the students live at or below the poverty line, Millennium Art Academy's first graduation rate was 87.5% (30% higher than the city average). 90% of the graduates are now attending college.
