= Ernie Barber (Australian footballer) =

Australian rules footballer

Personal information
- Full name: Ernest Milner Barber
- Born: 30 May 1895; Horsham, Victoria
- Died: 29 February 1972 (aged 76); Cheltenham, Victoria
- Original team: Williamstown Juniors

Playing career^{1}
Years	Club	Games (Goals)
1918–1919	South Melbourne	21 (28)
- ^{1} Playing statistics correct to the end of 1919.

Ernest Milner Barber (30 May 1895 – 29 February 1972) was an Australian rules footballer who played with South Melbourne in the Victorian Football League (VFL).

Barber, who played his junior football for Williamstown Juniors FC, was a forward for South Melbourne. He kicked 20 goals in 1918, his debut season, a total bettered by only two teammates that year. In just his 13th league game he played in a premiership, kicking a goal from the forward pocket in the 1918 VFL Grand Final win over Collingwood.
