= Frank Laird =

Australian rules footballer

Personal information
- Full name: Frank Graham Laird
- Born: 20 May 1893; Ballarat, Victoria
- Died: 17 September 1964 (aged 71); South Melbourne, Victoria
- Original team: Paddington
- Height: 179 cm (5 ft 10 in)
- Weight: 70 kg (154 lb)

Playing career^{1}
Years	Club	Games (Goals)
1921–25	South Melbourne	66 (21)
- ^{1} Playing statistics correct to the end of 1925.

Frank Graham Laird (20 May 1893 – 17 September 1964) was an Australian rules footballer who played with South Melbourne in the Victorian Football League (VFL).

His twin brother Charlie Laird also played for South Melbourne.
