= Edwin Hogan =

Australian rules footballer

Personal information
- Full name: Edwin Hogan
- Born: 12 May 1893
- Died: 21 September 1957 (aged 64)
- Original team: Glenhuntly (FFL)
- Position: Defender

Playing career^{1}
Years	Club	Games (Goals)
1918	St Kilda	2 (0)
- ^{1} Playing statistics correct to the end of 1918.

Edwin Hogan (12 May 1893 – 21 September 1957) was an Australian rules footballer who played with St Kilda in the Victorian Football League (VFL).
