= Doug Cox (footballer) =

Australian rules footballer (1957–2019)

Personal information
- Full name: Douglas Cox
- Born: 16 September 1957
- Died: 30 November 2019 (aged 62); Mildura
- Original team: South Mildura / West Torrens
- Height: 187 cm (6 ft 2 in)
- Weight: 89 kg (196 lb)

Playing career^{1}
Years	Club	Games (Goals)
1981–1982	St Kilda	36 (1)
1983–1984	Essendon	3 (0)
Total		39 (1)
- ^{1} Playing statistics correct to the end of 1984.

Douglas Cox (16 September 1957 – 30 November 2019) was an Australian rules footballer who played with St Kilda and Essendon in the Victorian Football League (VFL).

Originally from South Mildura, Cox played for West Torrens in the South Australian National Football League (SANFL) before joining St Kilda in 1981. His move to St Kilda proved controversial, as Richmond protested that he should never have made it to St Kilda because South Mildura was in Richmond's country zone. As a result, St Kilda was stripped of eight premiership points and fined $5000; but, the VFL amended the relevant rules later in the season, and reinstated St Kilda's points. Despite the controversy, the defender was able to play 20 games in 1981 and added another 16 in 1982.

At the end of the 1982 VFL season, Cox left St Kilda and signed with Essendon. He didn't make any senior appearances for his new club in 1983 after dislocating his wrist in a pre-season practice match, but was a member of the Essendon reserves premiership winning team. In 1984 he again had bad luck with injuries, hurting his thigh early in the season and then injuring himself in a motorcycle accident. He played just three league games that year and won the 1984 Grand Final sprint. It was his final season at Essendon, and he returned to West Torrens in 1985.
