= Tom Hynes =

Australian rules footballer

Personal information
- Full name: Tom Hynes
- Born: 4 April 1943 (age 83)
- Height: 187 cm (6 ft 2 in)
- Weight: 76 kg (168 lb)

Playing career^{1}
Years	Club	Games (Goals)
1962–64	South Melbourne	14 (1)
- ^{1} Playing statistics correct to the end of 1964.

Tom Hynes (born 4 April 1943) is a former Australian rules footballer who played with South Melbourne in the Victorian Football League (VFL).
