= Austus =

Variation of australian footbal

- First played: 1943

Characteristics
- Contact: Full contact
- Team members: Eighteen per side
- Type: Field
- Equipment: American football

Presence
- Country or region: Australia
- Obsolete: Yes

Austus was a variation of Australian rules football which was played in Australia during World War II between Australians and visiting soldiers from the United States. The name comes from the first four letters of Australia (AUST) and the initials of the United States (US).

The game is played with a gridiron ball and features both punting and forward passing, with Australian rules football style marking providing the opportunity for a free kick or throw and the absence of an offside rule.

== Background ==
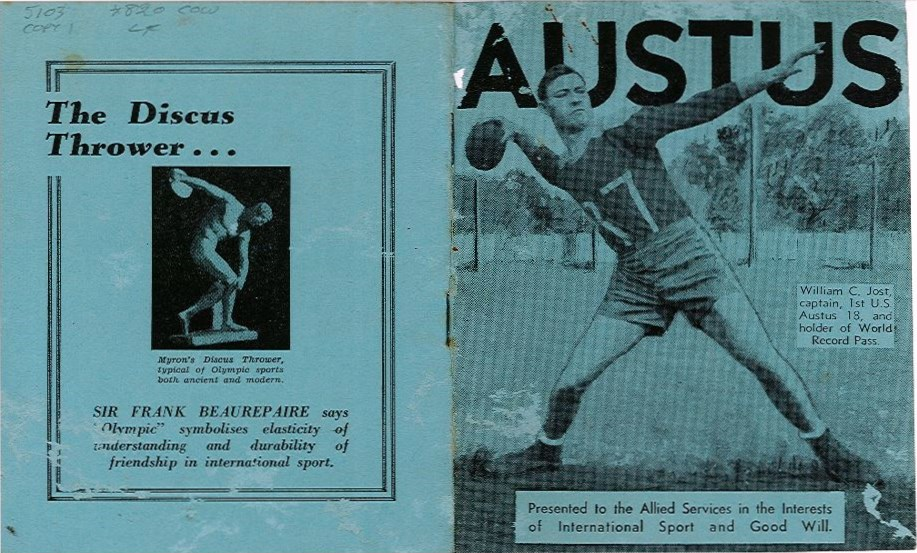
Ern Cowley's Austus sport program in 1943 featuring American serviceman William Jost performing a forward pass on an Australian Football oval.

Sports exhibitions by servicemen from both the Australian and visiting American services were commonplace during World War II as fundraisers, including American football, but it was not possible for teams from Australia and America to play against each other in either of their national football codes due to the differences in skills: Australians were not adept at long throws of the ball, as was common in American football, and Americans were not adept at kicking, particularly on the run, as was required to play Australian rules football.

To enable football competitions between Australians and Americans, a modified code was proposed. Although sometimes described as a hybrid between the Australian and American codes, creator Ern Cowley described it as "99% Australian rules with the addition of gridiron highlights". The only significant rule change from the Australian game was that the American football-style forward pass was allowed and afforded the same benefits as an Australian rules football kick. Therefore, a ball thrown over a distance of at least ten yards could be marked if caught on the full; and goals could be scored from throws, with the exception that a thrown goal must have been from a distance greater than twenty yards – an arc twenty yards from the goal line was painted on the field to enable this to be judged by umpires. The game was played with an American football rather than an Australian football, because the pointed design of the American ball meant that it could be both thrown and kicked. These rules enabled Americans to participate against Australians at Australian rules football using the ball skills they already possessed from playing American football.

The first game of Austus was played on 18 July 1943 at Punt Road Oval between a team of US Servicemen and an Australian Explosives Factory team over two 25-minute halves. The Americans won 8.4 (52) to 5.8 (38). Two weeks later, an Australian team including around twelve VFL players comfortably defeated the Americans 17.23 (125) d. 8.1 (49) in a full-length game. Archival footage of the game exists (Video on YouTube), exhibiting American players preference to run and forward pass the ball.

Several more games were played as exhibitions in 1943 and 1944. By the end of 1943, both countries' armed forces endorsed the game as a suitable activity for their troops, with the rules later published in official army publications. The US Army noted that the game was more suited to warmer climates than the American game, and was more convenient as it could be played without protective equipment.

The rules are credited to The Sporting Globe sportswriter and former Carlton player Ern Cowley. Cowley and leading American player Private Bill Jost, who was a prodigious throw and captained the American teams, were both presented medals by the Helms Athletic Foundation in 1944 for their services to the short-lived code.

The game disappeared after the large scale departures of American soldiers from Australia in 1945. Some consideration was given in 1946 to send Australian teams to America to demonstrate the sport but an absence of willing financial backers meant that the idea quickly fell through. It is almost certain that 1945 or 1946 were the last year the game was ever played.
