= Bill Daly (footballer) =

Australian rules footballer

Personal information
- Full name: William Joseph Daly
- Born: 7 November 1892; San Remo, Victoria
- Died: 26 September 1980 (aged 87); Parkdale, Victoria
- Original team: Beverley/Wonthaggi

Playing career^{1}
Years	Club	Games (Goals)
1913	Melbourne	2 (1)
1915–1919	South Melbourne	59 (1)
Total		61 (2)
- ^{1} Playing statistics correct to the end of 1919.

William Joseph Daly ( 7 November 1892 – 26 September 1980) was an Australian rules footballer who played with Melbourne and South Melbourne in the Victorian Football League (VFL).

Daly was recruited from Wonthaggi, but came from Beverley originally. He played just two games for Melbourne in the 1913 VFL season and didn't make any more league appearances until 1915, when he joined South Melbourne.

After the club sat out of league football in 1916 due to the war, Daly played all 16 games for South Melbourne in 1917. He again didn't miss a single game in 1918 and was on a half back flank in the 1918 VFL Grand Final winning side.

He subsequently played with Footscray in the Victorian Football Association (VFA).
