= Frank Magill (footballer) =

Australian rules footballer

Personal information
- Full name: Frank Magill
- Born: 30 March 1896
- Died: 6 November 1969 (aged 73)
- Original team: Middle Park CYMS (CYMSFA)

Playing career^{1}
Years	Club	Games (Goals)
1918	South Melbourne	2 (0)
- ^{1} Playing statistics correct to the end of 1918.

Frank Magill (30 March 1896 – 6 November 1969) was an Australian rules footballer who played with South Melbourne in the Victorian Football League (VFL).
