= Cyril Zimmer =

Australian rules footballer

Personal information
- Full name: Cyril Joseph Zimmer
- Born: 21 April 1896; Geelong, Victoria
- Died: 17 July 1951 (aged 55); Preston West, Victoria
- Original team: Bonnie Thistle

Playing career^{1}
Years	Club	Games (Goals)
1918	Fitzroy	1 (1)
- ^{1} Playing statistics correct to the end of 1918.

Cyril Joseph Zimmer (21 April 1896 – 17 July 1951) was an Australian rules footballer who played with Fitzroy in the Victorian Football League (VFL).

== Family ==
The son of Ernest William Zimmer (1857–1951), and Mary Anne Zimmer (1859–1910), née Bolger, Cyril Joseph Zimmer was born at Geelong on 21 April 1896.

He married Stella Marjorie Hanns (1902–1987) in 1922.

== Football ==
He kicked one goal in his single game at senior level.

== Death ==
He died at West Preston, Victoria on 17 July 1951.
