= Harry William Sawyer =

American physician and politician

Nevada Senate
- In office 1935–1939

Personal details
- Born: June 4, 1880 New York City
- Died: May 2, 1962 (aged 81) Reno, Nevada
- Party: Democratic Party
- Spouse: Bula Belle Cameron Sawyer
- Children: Grant Sawyer
- Education: College of Osteopath; College of Physicians and Surgeons (San Francisco)

Military service
- Allegiance: United States
- Branch/service: United States Navy
- Years of service: 1902–1906

Harry William Sawyer (June 4, 1880 – May 2, 1962) was an American physician and politician.

Sawyer was born in New York City, New York. He served in the United States Navy from 1902 to 1906. He went to the College of Osteopath in Kansas City, Missouri and to the College of Physicians and Surgeons in San Francisco, California. He received his medical degree on Feb. 21 1919 in the state of Texas.Sawyer practiced medicine in Twin Falls, Idaho and in Fallon, Nevada. He served as health officer for Churchill County, Nevada and as draft board physician for Churchill County. Sawyer also served as president of the Nevada Medical Association in 1938 and 1939. Sawyer served in the Nevada Senate from 1935 to 1939 and was involved with the Democratic Party. His son Grant Sawyer served as Governor of Nevada. Sawyer died at the Veterans Administration Hospital in Reno, Nevada after suffering from a fall.
