= Roy Ostberg =

Australian rules footballer

Personal information
- Full name: Horatio Engelbrecht Ragnar Ostberg
- Born: 21 March 1897; St Kilda, Victoria
- Died: 18 June 1942 (aged 45); Caulfield, Victoria
- Original team: Sandringham

Playing career^{1}
Years	Club	Games (Goals)
1918–19	St Kilda	22 (7)
- ^{1} Playing statistics correct to the end of 1919.

Horatio Engelbrecht Ragnar "Roy" Ostberg (21 March 1897 – 18 June 1942) was an Australian rules footballer who played with St Kilda in the Victorian Football League (VFL).

== Family ==
The son of Anders John Ostberg (1860-1928), known as "John Ostberg", and Sarah Ann Ostberg (1860-1947), formerly Mrs William Aram, née Hamilton, Horatio Engelbrecht Ragnar Ostberg was born at St Kilda, Victoria on 21 March 1897.

== Football ==
An outstanding footballer as a schoolboy, who had represented Melbourne State Schools in a match against Sydney State Schools that served as a curtain-raiser for the 1912 VFL Preliminary Final match between Essendon and Carlton, at the Melbourne Cricket Ground on 21 September 1912, and already a junior footballer with St Kilda, Ostberg was training with Melbourne, when he lost three fingers from his left hand in an industrial accident at his father's Richmond rubber factory.

=== St Kilda (VFL) ===
He played 22 games for St Kilda over two seasons (1918 and 1919). He played in all of St Kilda's fifteen matches in 1918; he played in the first match of the 1919 season, missed the next nine matches due to the Spanish flu, and then played in the last six matches of the home-and-away season.

=== Melbourne (VFL) ===
Although he trained with Melbourne in the 1920 pre-season, he did not go on to play with the club.

=== Prahran (VFA) ===
In May 1920 he was granted a clearance from St Kilda to the Prahran Football Club in the Victorian Football Association (VFA). He played well in his first match for the team, against Brunswick, on 22 May 1920. However, he was badly injured in the second quarter of his second match, against North Melbourne on 29 May 1920, and he never played again.

== Notoriety ==
=== Forgery of £5 notes ===
==== Arrest ====
On 22 December 1925 Ostberg and two others, Lance Phillip Skelton, a signwriter, and John Francis Gilligan, a pharmacist, were arrested at Gilligan's pharmacy at 448 Glen Huntly Road, Caulfield, where a small printing press was operating in the pharmacy's back-room dispensary.

Skelton and Gilligan were arrested in the process of operating the printing press, and Ostberg, who was absent at the time of the (armed with revolvers) police raid, was arrested by waiting police soon after, when he returned to the premises. The printing press was seized, along with enough paper (cut to size) to print several thousand notes. The police had become aware of "circumstances that indicated that plans were being perfected to flood Melbourne with forged £5 notes" and that "it was intended to pass a batch of the forged notes on Friday next [viz., 24 December], so as to take advantage of the closing of the banks over Christmas to delay detection".

==== First Trial ====
In March 1927 the three men were tried in the Criminal Court on charges of attempted forgery of Commonwealth notes. And at the end of the trial, the jury considered its verdict for six hours; and Skelton "was convicted of charges of conspiracy and having attempted to forge a £5 note", and Gilligan "was convicted on charges of conspiracy and having been knowingly directly concerned in the attempt by Skelton to forge a £5 note", whilst, in the case of Ostberg, "who was charged [with] conspiracy and having been directly concerned with the attempt to forge", the jury was unable to agree upon a verdict. Ostberg was remanded on bail, and a retrial was ordered. Skelton and Gilligan were both sentenced to four years' imprisonment, and Gilligan's name was permanently removed from the register of pharmacists.

==== Second Trial ====
In June 1927, Ostberg was tried again in the Criminal Court, "charged with having in December of last year conspired with Lance Philip Skelton and John Francis Giliigan to forgo £5 Commonwealth Bank notes, and also with having been knowingly and directly concerned in the commission of an offence — the forging of a Commonwealth security". The trial lasted three days and, once again, the jury was unable to agree upon a verdict; and, once again, Ostberg, was remanded on bail and a retrial ordered.

==== Third Trial ====
In July 1927, Ostberg was tried again in the Criminal Court; the trial lasted four days and, again, the jury was unable to agree on a verdict, and, again, Ostberg was remanded on bail.

==== Fourth Trial ====
In September 1927, Ostberg was tried again (this time in the Court of General Sessions); and yet, despite being locked up overnight, the jury could still not agree on a verdict in the Criminal Court, and Ostberg was remanded, on bail to re-appear at the Court in October 1927.

==== Prosecution abandoned ====
In October 1927 it was announced that the Commonwealth's prosecuting authorities were not insisting on a fifth trial, would abandon any further prosecution of Ostberg, and would file a nolle prosequi in his case.

== Death ==
He died at Caulfield, Victoria on 18 June 1942.
