= Les Gibaud =

Australian rules footballer, born 1901

Personal information
- Full name: Leslie Albert Gibaud
- Born: 28 June 1901; Fitzroy North, Victoria
- Died: 22 August 1983 (aged 82); Reservoir, Victoria
- Height: 170 cm (5 ft 7 in)

Playing career^{1}
Years	Club	Games (Goals)
1918	Fitzroy	10 (5)
- ^{1} Playing statistics correct to the end of 1918.

Leslie Albert Gibaud (28 June 1901 – 22 August 1983) was an Australian rules footballer who played with Fitzroy in the Victorian Football League (VFL).
