= Ambrose Maher =

Australian rules footballer

Personal information
- Full name: Ambrose Lindsay Maher
- Born: 2 January 1894; Poowong, Victoria
- Died: 20 November 1946 (aged 52); Mont Albert, Victoria
- Original team: Poowong

Playing career^{1}
Years	Club	Games (Goals)
1918	Geelong	10 (3)
- ^{1} Playing statistics correct to the end of 1918.

Ambrose Lindsay Maher (2 January 1894 – 20 November 1946) was an Australian rules footballer who played for the Geelong Football Club in the Victorian Football League (VFL).
