= Frank McPherson (Australian footballer) =

Australian rules footballer

Personal information
- Full name: Francis Cameron McPherson
- Born: 27 February 1896; Windsor, Victoria
- Died: 13 August 1969 (aged 73); Brighton, Victoria
- Original team: Prahran District

Playing career^{1}
Years	Club	Games (Goals)
1918	St Kilda	1 (0)
- ^{1} Playing statistics correct to the end of 1918.

Frank McPherson (27 February 1896 – 13 August 1969) was an Australian rules footballer who played with St Kilda in the Victorian Football League (VFL).
