= Katie Edith Gliddon =

British painter

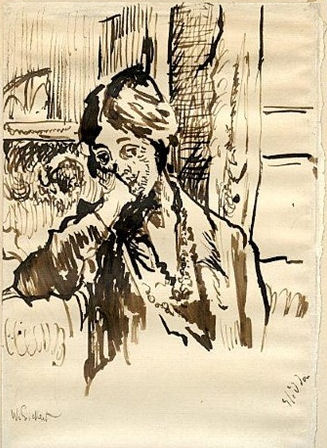
Probable portrait of Katie Edith Gliddon in ink and brush by Walter Sickert (c. 1912)

Katie Edith Gliddon (6 May 1883 – 1 September 1967) was a British watercolourist and militant suffragette. She was a member of the Women's Social and Political Union (WSPU) for whom she campaigned for which she was imprisoned in Holloway Prison in 1912. Specialising in painting flowers, in her later years she was a teacher of painting and drawing.

== Early years ==
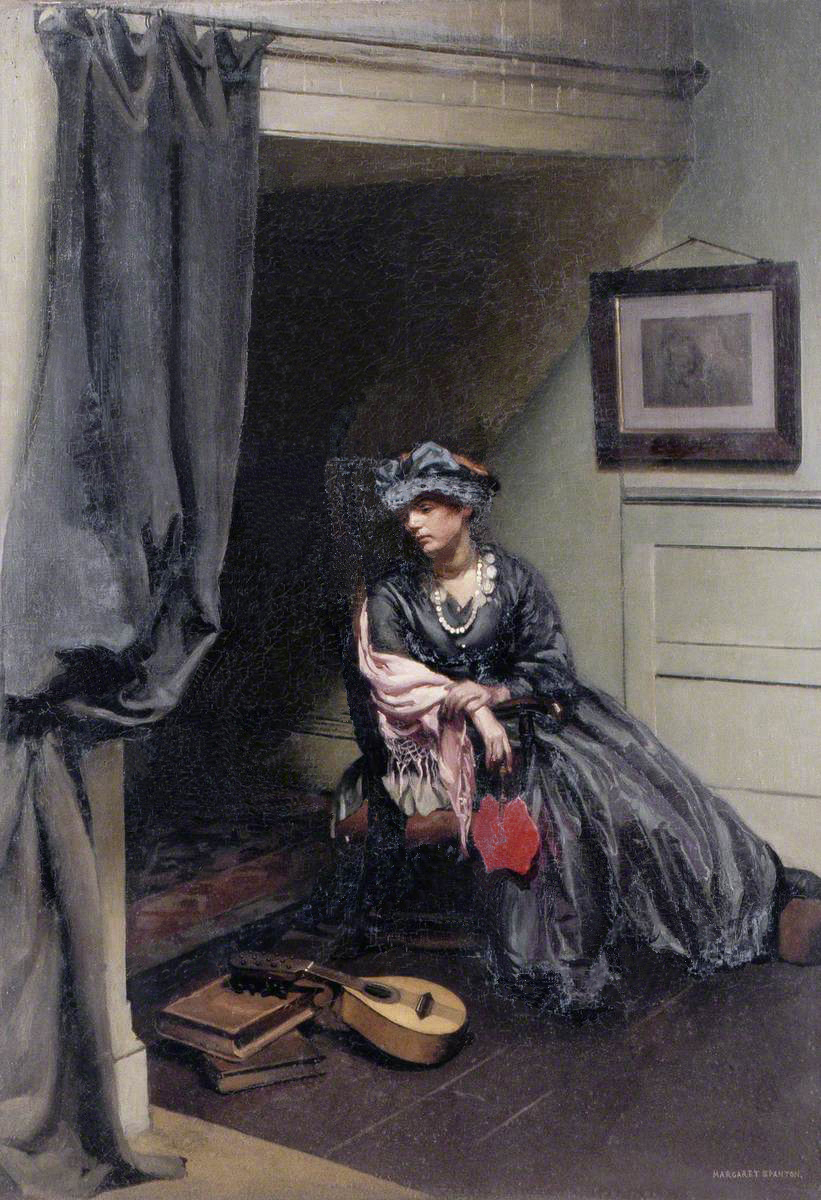
Katie Gliddon was the model for In an Alcove (1902) by her relative and fellow-suffragette Helen Margaret Spanton

Gliddon was born in Twickenham in Middlesex in 1883, the daughter of Margaret Martha née Lelean (1860–1941) and Aurelius James Louis Gliddon (1857–1929), a minister for the United Reformed Church (1882–84) and a homoeopathist. The 1911 Census lists him as a General Merchant and Investment Broker and Katie Edith as an artist, she having studied at the Slade School of Fine Art from 1900 to 1904 under Frederick Brown and Henry Tonks. Her younger sister Gladys Evelyn Gliddon (1886–1969) was also listed as an artist. Her younger brother Lt. Maurice Gliddon MC (1892–1917) was killed in action during World War I.

== Activism ==
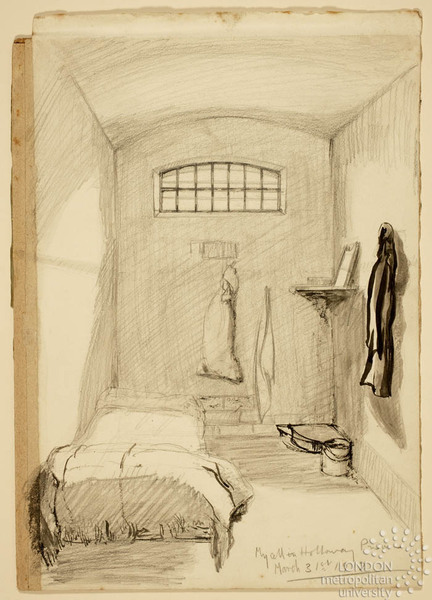
Katie Gliddon's prison cell in Holloway Prison – drawn by her in 1912 in her copy of The Poetical Works of Percy Bysshe Shelley

Gliddon joined the Croydon branch of the Women's Social and Political Union (WSPU) in about 1910 at about the same time that her brother Cuthbert Paul Gliddon was acting as an organiser of the Men's Political Union for Women's Enfranchisement. He campaigned under the name 'Charles Gray' to save his parents' embarrassment while Katie Edith went under the pseudonym 'Catherine Susan Gray' for the same reason. By 1911 she had published articles on women's suffrage in several newspapers. The New York-based Davis & Langdale Company lists an ink and brush painting titled ‘Gliddon’ by the artist Walter Sickert from about 1912 which almost certainly portrays Katie Gliddon as she knew Sickert's sister Helena Swanwick, who was also an activist for women's suffrage. In addition, both Gliddon and Sickert were members of the New English Art Club.

In March 1912 she smashed the window of a Post Office in Wimpole Street and was arrested and sentenced to two months imprisonment with hard labour in Holloway Prison which she served during March and April 1912. Expecting to be imprisoned for her actions Gliddon had sewn pencils into the collar of her coat and used these to write and illustrate a secret prison diary in the margins of her copy of The Poetical Works of Percy Bysshe Shelley. Gliddon's sentence of hard labour was sewing and she wrote in her prison diary that she deliberately sewed badly.

== Later years ==
After World War I Gliddon became a successful watercolour artist specialising in painting flowers, exhibiting at the Royal Academy of Arts, the New English Art Club, the Society of Women Artists and the Royal Society of Painters in Water Colours among other galleries. In 1927 she illustrated French Poetry for Children by Archibald Watson Bain. In 1939 she was living in Woking in Surrey where she was listed as a Teacher of Drawing.

After a career as an art teacher she retired to 10 Southey Road in Worthing in West Sussex and died in Worthing in 1967 aged 84. A friend and relative was the fellow-suffragette Helen Margaret Spanton. She never married. Her papers, drawings and original prison diary are in the Women's Library, having been donated by her nephews.

In 2019 the Museum of Croydon held an exhibition to commemorate her life and her link with the town.
