= Chip Turner =

Australian rules footballer

Personal information
- Full name: Samuel Chipman Turner
- Born: 10 July 1893; Ballarat, Victoria
- Died: 13 June 1978 (aged 84); Sandringham, Victoria
- Original team: Golden Point (BFL)

Playing career^{1}
Years	Club	Games (Goals)
1918–1922	South Melbourne	66 (1)
- ^{1} Playing statistics correct to the end of 1922.

Samuel Chipman "Chip" Turner (10 July 1893 – 13 June 1978) was an Australian rules footballer who played with South Melbourne in the Victorian Football League (VFL).

South Melbourne first tried to get a clearance for Turner, from Ballarat Football League side Golden Point, in 1915. but he didn't start at the club until 1918 due to the war. He arrived in time to enjoy South Melbourne's successful 1918 premiership campaign and as a full-back in the grand final kept Collingwood player Dick Lee to three goals.

Turner had cemented his spot in the team after his strong debut season and played 17 of a possible 19 games in 1919. He spent three more years with South Melbourne before retiring.
