= Reg Thompson =

Australian rules footballer

Personal information
- Full name: Reginald Joseph Bowerman Thompson
- Born: 9 April 1895; Port Fairy, Victoria
- Died: 18 July 1953 (aged 58); Brighton, Victoria
- Original team: Returned Soldiers

Playing career^{1}
| Years | Club | Games (Goals) |
| 1918–19 | St Kilda | 8 (4) |
- ^{1} Playing statistics correct to the end of 1919.

Reginald Joseph Bowerman Thompson (9 April 1895 – 18 July 1953) was an Australian rules footballer who played with St Kilda in the Victorian Football League (VFL).
