= Reg Berry =

Australian rules footballer

Personal information
- Full name: Reginald James Berry
- Born: 21 June 1892; Frankston, Victoria
- Died: 5 May 1944 (aged 51); Caulfield, Victoria
- Original team: Bendigo City

Playing career^{1}
| Years | Club | Games (Goals) |
| 1918–19 | St Kilda | 26 (9) |
- ^{1} Playing statistics correct to the end of 1919.

Reginald James Berry (21 June 1892 – 5 May 1944) was an Australian rules footballer who played with St Kilda in the Victorian Football League (VFL). He served in the Australian Imperial Force during the First World War, being wounded at Gallipoli.
