= Billy Billett =

Australian rules footballer

Personal information
- Full name: William Billett
- Born: 21 May 1888
- Died: 28 January 1956 (aged 67)
- Original team: Brunswick (VFA)
- Height: 171 cm (5 ft 7 in)
- Weight: 66 kg (146 lb)

Playing career^{1}
Years	Club	Games (Goals)
1918	Fitzroy	12 (2)
1923	South Melbourne	3 (4)
Total		15 (6)
- ^{1} Playing statistics correct to the end of 1923.

Billy Billett (21 May 1888 – 28 January 1956) was an Australian rules footballer who played with Fitzroy and South Melbourne in the Victorian Football League (VFL).
