= Thomas C. Peterson =

American climatologist and meteorologist

- Education: Colorado State University (Ph.D., 1991)
- Awards: National Oceanic and Atmospheric Administration Administrator's Award
- Scientific career
- Fields: Climatology
- Workplaces: World Meteorological Organization
- Thesis: The relationships between SST anomalies and clouds, water vapor, and their radiative effects (1991)

Thomas Carl Peterson is an American climatologist and meteorologist. He is the president of the World Meteorological Organization's Commission for Climatology, and the former chief scientist at the National Climatic Data Center in Asheville, North Carolina, from which he retired in July 2015. He was a lead author of the IPCC Fourth Assessment Report, and was the co-editor-in-chief and co-chair of the United States Global Change Research Program's 2009 report "Global Climate Change Impacts in the United States". In 2004, he was named one of the top 1% most cited researchers in the field of geoscience by the Essential Science Indicators.
