= Bill Gliddon =

Australian rules footballer

Personal information
- Full name: William John Gliddon
- Born: 31 August 1896; Footscray, Victoria
- Died: 28 January 1974 (aged 77); Geelong, Victoria
- Original team: East Geelong
- Height: 165 cm (5 ft 5 in)
- Weight: 62 kg (137 lb)

Playing career^{1}
Years	Club	Games (Goals)
1918	Geelong	1 (0)
- ^{1} Playing statistics correct to the end of 1918.

William John Gliddon (31 August 1896 – 28 January 1974) was an Australian rules footballer who played with Geelong in the Victorian Football League (VFL).
