= Harry Sawyer (Australian rules footballer) =

Australian rules footballer

Personal information
- Full name: Harry Sawyer
- Born: 11 August 1895
- Died: 21 September 1963 (aged 68); Echuca Hospital
- Original team: Footscray Juniors

Playing career^{1}
Years	Club	Games (Goals)
1918	Essendon	4 (0)
- ^{1} Playing statistics correct to the end of 1918.

Harry Sawyer (11 August 1895 – 21 September 1963) was an Australian rules footballer who played with Essendon in the Victorian Football League (VFL).
