= Eric Gordon (footballer) =

Australian rules footballer (1898–1981)

Personal information
- Full name: Eric Audley Gordon
- Born: 14 June 1898; Malvern, Victoria
- Died: 30 June 1981 (aged 83); Dandenong, Victoria

Playing career^{1}
Years	Club	Games (Goals)
1918	St Kilda	2 (0)
- ^{1} Playing statistics correct to the end of 1918.

Eric Audley Gordon (14 June 1898 – 30 June 1981) was an Australian rules footballer who played with St Kilda in the Victorian Football League (VFL).
