= Tom O'Halloran (footballer) =

Australian rules footballer

Personal information
- Full name: Thomas O'Halloran
- Born: 9 March 1892; Williamstown, Victoria
- Died: 3 January 1970 (aged 77); Elwood, Victoria
- Original team: Williamstown (VFA)
- Height: 180 cm (5 ft 11 in)
- Weight: 72 kg (159 lb)

Playing career^{1}
Years	Club	Games (Goals)
1912–1915	Williamstown (VFA)	54 (18)
1918–1921	South Melbourne	62 (12)
1922	Prahran (VFA)	12 (2)
1923	Williamstown (VFA)	16 (4)
- ^{1} Playing statistics correct to the end of 1921.

Thomas O'Halloran (9 March 1892 – 3 January 1970) was an Australian rules footballer who played with South Melbourne in the VFL.

Williamstown recruit Tom O'Halloran was primarily a ruckman but was used in various other positions. He was a centre half-forward in South Melbourne's 1918 premiership side and a three time Victorian interstate representative.
