= Jack Keily =

Australian rules footballer

Personal information
- Full name: John David Keily
- Born: 6 August 1898; Carlton, Victoria
- Died: 3 March 1966 (aged 67); Kew, Victoria
- Original team: Havelock
- Height: 178 cm (5 ft 10 in)
- Weight: 73 kg (161 lb)

Playing career^{1}
Years	Club	Games (Goals)
1918	Carlton	4 (0)
- ^{1} Playing statistics correct to the end of 1918.

John David Keily (6 August 1898 – 3 March 1966) was an Australian rules footballer who played with Carlton in the Victorian Football League (VFL).
