= Ern Cowley =

Australian rules footballer

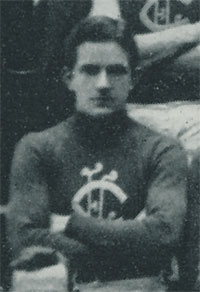
- Cowley during his Carlton career

Personal information
- Full name: Ernest Clyde Cowley
- Born: 17 August 1892; Brunswick East, Victoria
- Died: 20 October 1975 (aged 83); Ivanhoe, Victoria
- Original team: Brunswick
- Height: 178 cm (5 ft 10 in)
- Weight: 72 kg (159 lb)
- Position: Forward

Playing career^{1}
Years	Club	Games (Goals)
1918–1919	Carlton	24 (51)
- ^{1} Playing statistics correct to the end of 1919.

Ernest Clyde Cowley (17 August 1892 – 20 October 1975) was an Australian rules footballer who played for Carlton in the Victorian Football League (VFL).

== Background ==
Cowley came to Carlton from Brunswick and had a strong debut season, kicking 35 goals to top the VFL's goalkicking. He played just one more year with Carlton before returning to the VFA where he joined Prahran. Cowley was also a proficient baseball pitcher who represented Victoria in interstate competition.

Cowley invented the football game called "Austus", a combination of Australian and American football which was played between Australians and visiting American servicemen during World War II. He was a journalist with the Sporting Globe and wrote on American sports, particularly baseball.
