= New York City Lab School for Collaborative Studies =

Public school in New York City

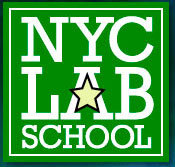

Location
- 333 West 17th Street; New York City, New York; United States; 40°44′33″N 74°00′09″W

Information
- Type: Public school
- Established: 1987
- Founder: Sheila Breslaw, Rob Menken
- School district: 2
- Principal: Megan Adams (Middle School); Brooke Jackson (High School)
- Grades: 6–12
- Enrollment: 1,056
- Colors: Green and White
- Mascot: Alligator
- National ranking: 578
- Website: http://www.nyclabschool.org http://www.labmiddleschool.com

The New York City Lab School for Collaborative Studies is a secondary school in the Chelsea neighborhood of Manhattan in New York City. It serves students in grades 6–12 and was described as one of the best schools in Manhattan in 2010 by the New York Post and CUNY. The school is a part of the New York City Department of Education.

== Admission ==
Admission into the 6th grade is based on an entrance exam consisting of one page of mathematics problems and an essay. For admission into the 9th grade, students must follow the DOE high school admissions process. As of 2013, admissions requirements for the high school are a minimum of 85% in all 7th grade classes and a grade of 3 to 4 (or a score of 650) in the 7th grade reading and math exams. Admission into both the 6th and 9th grades is competitive, with 3000 students applying for 190 places in the 6th grade and with approximately 3000 students applying for 136 places in the 9th grade. Lab Middle and Lab High are two discrete schools, and students who are accepted to Lab Middle School are not automatically admitted to Lab high school. Lab high school gives priority to applicants from district 2.

== Principals ==
The principal of the NYC Lab Middle School (Grades 6–8) is Megan Adams. The principal of the high school (grades 9–12) is Brooke Jackson. The Lab School was founded in 1987 and the first location was on 82nd street between First and Second Avenue. Sheila Breslaw and Rob Menken were the founding Co-Directors and Principals.

== TASTES from the Meatpacking district through Chelsea ==
In May 2009, Lab collaborated with some of New York City's top restaurants for "TASTES from the Meatpacking District through Chelsea." The festival featured a walk-around tasting of several New York City restaurants for the purpose of raising money for Lab student programs. As of 2016, TASTES (now held in the fall of each year) continues to be a well-attended, highly publicized fundraiser for Lab Middle and High School.

== Notable alumni ==
- Morena Baccarin (Attended for 7th and 8th grades) – Actress
- Claire Danes (Attended for 7th and 8th grades) – Actress
- Audrey Gelman, Former CEO of The Wing - Businesswoman
- Adam Hann-Byrd (Graduated 2000) – Actor
- Charlie Hofheimer (Graduated 1999) – Actor
- Kamara James (Attended Jr. High) – US Olympic Fencer
- Michela Marino Lerman (Graduated 2004) - Jazz Tap Dancer
- Max Lugavere (Graduated 2000) – Host on Current TV
- Ramón Rodríguez - Actor
- Nick Valensi (Attended from 10th–12th grade; graduated in 1998) – Guitarist for The Strokes
- Hunter Walker (Attended Jr. High) - Journalist
- AJR - American pop band
- Qian Julie Wang - Author
