= Tommy Peterson (footballer) =

Australian rules footballer

Personal information
- Full name: Tom Peterson
- Born: 19 February 1898; Stawell, Victoria
- Died: 12 April 1950 (aged 52); Heidelberg, Victoria

Playing career^{1}
Years	Club	Games (Goals)
1918	Geelong	1 (0)
- ^{1} Playing statistics correct to the end of 1918.

Tom Peterson (19 February 1898 – 12 April 1950) was an Australian rules footballer who played with Geelong in the Victorian Football League (VFL).
