= Bill Clohesy =

Australian rules footballer

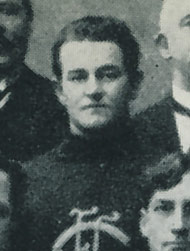
- Clohesy in 1918

Personal information
- Full name: William John Clohesy
- Born: 5 November 1894; Eaglehawk, Victoria
- Died: 8 November 1945 (aged 51); Kew, Victoria
- Original team: Carlton Juniors

Playing career^{1}
Years	Club	Games (Goals)
1918	Carlton	1 (0)
- ^{1} Playing statistics correct to the end of 1918.

William John Clohesy (5 November 1894 – 8 November 1945) was an Australian rules footballer who played with Carlton in the Victorian Football League (VFL).
