= Jamie Turner =

Australian rules footballer

Personal information
- Born: 12 August 1962 (age 64)
- Original team: Montmorency (DVFL)

Playing career^{1}
Years	Club	Games (Goals)
1984–1993	Collingwood	160 (33)
- ^{1} Playing statistics correct to the end of 1993.

Career highlights
- Collingwood Premiership side 1990

Jamie Turner (born 12 August 1962) is a former Australian rules footballer who played in the Australian Football League (AFL).

Son of Collingwood premiership player Ken, Jamie would also play with the Magpies, making his debut in 1984 coming across from Montmorency. Turner established himself as a top wingman, but had the versatility to play at either end of the ground.

In 1990, Turner would add the family name to the record books, being the 21st case of father and sons in premiership teams. Turner played on until 1993, playing 160 VFL/AFL games before retiring.
