= Doug Thomson (footballer) =

Australian rules footballer

Personal information
- Full name: Doug Thomson
- Born: 14 December 1896
- Died: 2 February 1959 (aged 62)

Playing career^{1}
Years	Club	Games (Goals)
1918, 1920	St Kilda	2 (0)
- ^{1} Playing statistics correct to the end of 1920.

Doug Thomson (14 December 1896 – 2 February 1959) was an Australian rules footballer who played with St Kilda in the Victorian Football League (VFL).
