= 1918 VFL season =

22nd season of the Victorian Football League (VFL)

1918 VFL premiership season
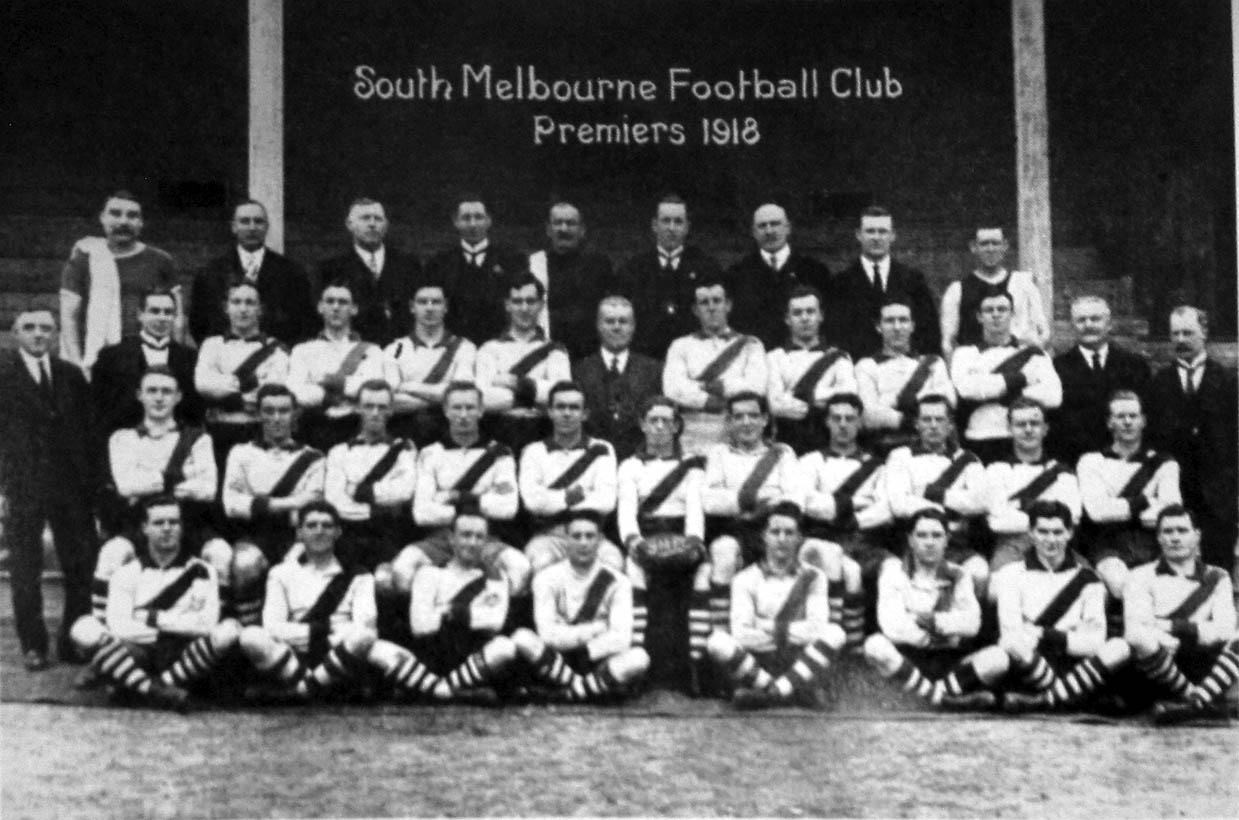
- South Melbourne 1918 VFL premiership team
- Date: 11 May – 7 September 1918
- Teams: 8
- Premiers: South Melbourne; 2nd premiership
- Minor premiers: South Melbourne; 3rd minor premiership
- Leading goalkicker medallist: Ern Cowley (Carlton); 35 goals
- Matches played: 59

The 1918 VFL season was the 22nd season of the Victorian Football League (VFL), the highest-level senior Australian rules football competition in Victoria. Played during the final year of World War I, eight of the league's nine clubs featured in 1918, with Essendon and St Kilda returning after being in recess the previous two seasons and only Melbourne absent. The season ran from 11 May to 7 September, comprising a 14-match home-and-away season followed by a three-week finals series featuring the top four clubs.

South Melbourne won the premiership, defeating Collingwood by five points in the 1918 VFL grand final; it was South Melbourne's second VFL premiership. South Melbourne also won the minor premiership by finishing atop the home-and-away ladder with a 13–1 win–loss record. Carlton's Ern Cowley won the leading goalkicker medal as the league's leading goalkicker.

== Background ==
In 1918, the VFL competition consisted of eight teams of 18 on-the-field players each, with no "reserves", although any of the 18 players who had left the playing field for any reason could later resume their place on the field at any time during the match.

Each team played each other twice in a home-and-away season of 14 rounds.

Once the 14 round home-and-away season had finished, the 1918 VFL Premiers were determined by the specific format and conventions of the amended "Argus system".

== Home-and-away season ==
=== Round 1 ===
Home team	Home team score	Away team	Away team score	Venue	Date
South Melbourne	7.15 (57)	Geelong	4.7 (31)	Lake Oval	11 May 1918
St Kilda	4.16 (40)	Fitzroy	4.10 (34)	Junction Oval	11 May 1918
Richmond	5.16 (46)	Essendon	4.10 (34)	Punt Road Oval	11 May 1918
Collingwood	8.17 (65)	Carlton	4.6 (30)	Victoria Park	11 May 1918

=== Round 2 ===
Home team	Home team score	Away team	Away team score	Venue	Date
Fitzroy	5.8 (38)	South Melbourne	12.6 (78)	Brunswick Street Oval	18 May 1918
Essendon	8.13 (61)	St Kilda	6.18 (54)	EMCG	18 May 1918
Carlton	8.5 (53)	Richmond	7.16 (58)	Princes Park	18 May 1918
Geelong	5.6 (36)	Collingwood	7.6 (48)	Corio Oval	18 May 1918

=== Round 3 ===
Home team	Home team score	Away team	Away team score	Venue	Date
Carlton	11.11 (77)	St Kilda	7.9 (51)	Princes Park	25 May 1918
Richmond	6.8 (44)	Fitzroy	10.12 (72)	Punt Road Oval	25 May 1918
Geelong	6.16 (52)	Essendon	4.12 (36)	Corio Oval	25 May 1918
South Melbourne	12.13 (85)	Collingwood	9.13 (67)	Lake Oval	25 May 1918

=== Round 4 ===
Home team	Home team score	Away team	Away team score	Venue	Date
Collingwood	11.10 (76)	Richmond	8.8 (56)	Victoria Park	1 June 1918
Essendon	4.13 (37)	Carlton	8.27 (75)	EMCG	1 June 1918
St Kilda	6.13 (49)	South Melbourne	6.8 (44)	Junction Oval	3 June 1918
Fitzroy	10.14 (74)	Geelong	8.14 (62)	Brunswick Street Oval	3 June 1918

=== Round 5 ===
Home team	Home team score	Away team	Away team score	Venue	Date
Geelong	6.13 (49)	Richmond	7.18 (60)	Corio Oval	8 June 1918
Collingwood	14.21 (105)	St Kilda	6.9 (45)	Victoria Park	8 June 1918
Fitzroy	9.12 (66)	Essendon	2.13 (25)	Brunswick Street Oval	8 June 1918
South Melbourne	11.10 (76)	Carlton	10.12 (72)	Lake Oval	8 June 1918

=== Round 6 ===
Home team	Home team score	Away team	Away team score	Venue	Date
Richmond	5.13 (43)	St Kilda	7.18 (60)	Punt Road Oval	15 June 1918
Essendon	4.8 (32)	South Melbourne	7.10 (52)	EMCG	15 June 1918
Collingwood	7.11 (53)	Fitzroy	3.6 (24)	Victoria Park	15 June 1918
Carlton	16.15 (111)	Geelong	7.3 (45)	Princes Park	15 June 1918

=== Round 7 ===
Home team	Home team score	Away team	Away team score	Venue	Date
South Melbourne	12.14 (86)	Richmond	4.10 (34)	Lake Oval	22 June 1918
St Kilda	15.13 (103)	Geelong	5.9 (39)	Junction Oval	22 June 1918
Essendon	4.9 (33)	Collingwood	14.14 (98)	EMCG	22 June 1918
Fitzroy	6.15 (51)	Carlton	12.11 (83)	Brunswick Street Oval	22 June 1918

=== Round 8 ===
Home team	Home team score	Away team	Away team score	Venue	Date
Geelong	7.8 (50)	South Melbourne	7.13 (55)	Corio Oval	29 June 1918
Fitzroy	7.6 (48)	St Kilda	3.5 (23)	Brunswick Street Oval	29 June 1918
Essendon	3.4 (22)	Richmond	5.15 (45)	EMCG	29 June 1918
Carlton	6.13 (49)	Collingwood	6.5 (41)	Princes Park	29 June 1918

=== Round 9 ===
Home team	Home team score	Away team	Away team score	Venue	Date
Collingwood	12.14 (86)	Geelong	7.10 (52)	Victoria Park	6 July 1918
South Melbourne	12.14 (86)	Fitzroy	8.13 (61)	Lake Oval	6 July 1918
St Kilda	6.14 (50)	Essendon	6.6 (42)	Junction Oval	6 July 1918
Richmond	7.16 (58)	Carlton	8.13 (61)	Punt Road Oval	6 July 1918

=== Round 10 ===
Home team	Home team score	Away team	Away team score	Venue	Date
Fitzroy	10.11 (71)	Richmond	6.7 (43)	Brunswick Street Oval	13 July 1918
Essendon	8.10 (58)	Geelong	5.9 (39)	EMCG	13 July 1918
Collingwood	6.8 (44)	South Melbourne	7.9 (51)	Victoria Park	13 July 1918
St Kilda	4.20 (44)	Carlton	2.5 (17)	Junction Oval	13 July 1918

=== Round 11 ===
Home team	Home team score	Away team	Away team score	Venue	Date
Carlton	10.20 (80)	Essendon	4.7 (31)	Princes Park	20 July 1918
South Melbourne	14.17 (101)	St Kilda	7.9 (51)	Lake Oval	20 July 1918
Geelong	5.6 (36)	Fitzroy	11.6 (72)	Corio Oval	20 July 1918
Richmond	6.13 (49)	Collingwood	11.10 (76)	Punt Road Oval	20 July 1918

=== Round 12 ===
Home team	Home team score	Away team	Away team score	Venue	Date
Essendon	8.10 (58)	Fitzroy	6.6 (42)	EMCG	27 July 1918
Carlton	5.13 (43)	South Melbourne	8.7 (55)	Princes Park	27 July 1918
Richmond	15.15 (105)	Geelong	10.11 (71)	Punt Road Oval	27 July 1918
St Kilda	9.9 (63)	Collingwood	6.14 (50)	Junction Oval	27 July 1918

=== Round 13 ===
Home team	Home team score	Away team	Away team score	Venue	Date
St Kilda	10.7 (67)	Richmond	8.9 (57)	Junction Oval	3 August 1918
South Melbourne	12.13 (85)	Essendon	7.10 (52)	Lake Oval	3 August 1918
Fitzroy	8.12 (60)	Collingwood	10.19 (79)	Brunswick Street Oval	3 August 1918
Geelong	10.7 (67)	Carlton	4.13 (37)	Corio Oval	3 August 1918

=== Round 14 ===
Home team	Home team score	Away team	Away team score	Venue	Date
Richmond	7.12 (54)	South Melbourne	7.17 (59)	Punt Road Oval	10 August 1918
Geelong	10.27 (87)	St Kilda	6.6 (42)	Corio Oval	10 August 1918
Collingwood	9.14 (68)	Essendon	3.8 (26)	Victoria Park	10 August 1918
Carlton	10.14 (74)	Fitzroy	9.7 (61)	Princes Park	10 August 1918

== Ladder ==
(P)	Premiers
	Qualified for finals

#	Team	P	W	L	D	PF	PA	%	Pts
1	South Melbourne (P)	14	13	1	0	970	678	143.1	52
2	Collingwood	14	10	4	0	956	659	145.1	40
3	Carlton	14	8	6	0	862	740	116.5	32
4	St Kilda	14	8	6	0	742	805	92.2	32
5	Fitzroy	14	6	8	0	774	784	98.7	24
6	Richmond	14	5	9	0	752	857	87.7	20
7	Geelong	14	3	11	0	716	944	75.8	12
8	Essendon	14	3	11	0	547	852	64.2	12

Rules for classification: 1. premiership points; 2. percentage; 3. points for
Average score: 56.4
Source: AFL Tables

== Finals series ==
All of the 1918 finals were played at the MCG so the home team in the semi-finals and preliminary final is purely the higher ranked team from the ladder but in the Grand Final the home team was the team that won the preliminary final.

The second semi-final was scheduled to be played on the 24th of August, but heavy rain caused a postponement to the 31st of August — the first postponement of a finals match in VFL history.

=== Semi-finals ===
Home team	Score	Away team	Score	Venue	Date
Collingwood	7.16 (58)	St Kilda	7.7 (49)	MCG	17 August
South Melbourne	8.10 (58)	Carlton	7.11 (53)	MCG	31 August

=== Grand final ===
South Melbourne defeated Collingwood 9.8 (62) to 7.15 (57), in front of a crowd of 39,168 people. (For an explanation of scoring see Australian rules football).

== Season notes ==
- Essendon and St Kilda re-entered the VFL competition. The Essendon players met their own expenses and played as amateurs, with the club donating all of its 1918 profits (which amounted to £194-19-8) to "patriotic and charitable purposes".
- In Round 2, Richmond recorded its first VFL win over Carlton after 23 consecutive losses, a losing streak dating back to Richmond's entry into the VFL in 1908.

== Awards ==
- The 1918 VFL Premiership team was South Melbourne.
- The VFL's leading goalkicker was Ern Cowley of Carlton with 34 goals.
- Essendon took the "wooden spoon" in 1918.

== Sources ==
- 1918 VFL season at AFL Tables
- 1918 VFL season at Australian Football
