= Ossie O'Connell =

Australian rules footballer

Personal information
- Full name: Oswald Leo O'Connell
- Born: 16 September 1884; Fitzroy, Victoria
- Died: 12 July 1960 (aged 75); Fairfield, Victoria

Playing career^{1}
Years	Club	Games (Goals)
1903	South Melbourne	1 (1)
1905–06	St Kilda	8 (1)
Total		9 (2)
- ^{1} Playing statistics correct to the end of 1906.

Oswald Leo O'Connell (16 September 1884 – 12 July 1960) was an Australian rules footballer who played with South Melbourne and St Kilda in the Victorian Football League (VFL).
