= George Condon =

Australian rules footballer

Personal information
- Full name: George Leslie Condon
- Born: 6 July 1906; South Melbourne, Victoria
- Died: 7 July 1976 (aged 70); Fairfield, Victoria
- Original team: Middle Park / Leopold

Playing career^{1}
Years	Club	Games (Goals)
1928, 1930	South Melbourne	7 (0)
- ^{1} Playing statistics correct to the end of 1930.

George Leslie Condon (6 July 1906 – 7 July 1976) was an Australian rules footballer who played with South Melbourne in the Victorian Football League (VFL).
