= Lindsay Green =

Lindsay Green may refer to:

- Lindsay Green (cricketer) (born 1938), New Zealand cricketer
- Lindsay Green (footballer) (1930-1998), Australian rules footballer
