= Lindsay Green (footballer) =

Australian rules footballer

Personal information
- Full name: Lindsay Green
- Born: 21 February 1930
- Died: 12 December 1998 (aged 68)
- Original team: Preston
- Height: 179 cm (5 ft 10 in)
- Weight: 80 kg (176 lb)

Playing career^{1}
Years	Club	Games (Goals)
1952, 1954	South Melbourne	4 (1)
- ^{1} Playing statistics correct to the end of 1954.

Lindsay Green (21 February 1930 – 12 December 1998) was an Australian rules footballer who played with South Melbourne in the Victorian Football League (VFL).
