= Bruce Davis (Australian footballer) =

Australian rules footballer

Personal information
- Full name: Bruce Davis
- Born: 26 March 1953 (age 73)
- Original team: Spotswood
- Height: 178 cm (5 ft 10 in)
- Weight: 88 kg (194 lb)

Playing career^{1}
Years	Club	Games (Goals)
1970–73	South Melbourne	36 (15)
- ^{1} Playing statistics correct to the end of 1973.

Bruce Davis (born 26 March 1953) is a former Australian rules footballer who played with South Melbourne in the Victorian Football League (VFL).
