= List of Collingwood Football Club players =

This is a list of Collingwood Football Club players who have made one or more appearance in the Australian Football League (AFL), known as the Victorian Football League (VFL) until 1990. Collingwood were one of the foundation clubs for the inaugural VFL season in 1897.

== Collingwood Football Club players ==
Key
| Order | Players are listed in order of debut |
| Debut year | Debuts are for VFL/AFL regular season and finals series matches only |
| Games | Statistics are for VFL/AFL regular season and finals series matches only and are correct to the end of the 2026 season |
| Goals | Statistics are for VFL/AFL regular season and finals series matches only and are correct to the end of the 2026 season |
| Years at club | Includes Collingwood only careers and spans from the season the player joined the club to the year in which they left |
| ^{^} | Currently listed players |

| Debut year | Player | Games | Goals | Years at club |
|---|---|---|---|---|
| 1897 | George Callesen | 17 | 5 | 1897–1898 |
| 1897 | Dick Condon | 149 | 101 | 1897–1900, 1902–1906 |
| 1897 | Charlie Dow | 72 | 1 | 1897–1902 |
| 1897 | Harry Dowdall | 38 | 21 | 1897–1900 |
| 1897 | Arthur Gibbs | 22 | 0 | 1897–1898 |
| 1897 | Wal Gillard | 37 | 20 | 1897–1899 |
| 1897 | Jim Gregory | 42 | 17 | 1897–1901 |
| 1897 | Frank Hailwood | 104 | 37 | 1897–1902, 1904 |
| 1897 | Rhoda McDonald | 9 | 2 | 1897 |
| 1897 | Jack Monohan Sr. | 171 | 7 | 1897–1907 |
| 1897 | Bill O'Brien | 67 | 0 | 1897–1901 |
| 1897 | Charlie H. Pannam | 179 | 111 | 1897–1907 |
| 1897 | Tom Paterson | 9 | 0 | 1897 |
| 1897 | Dick Poole | 1 | 0 | 1897 |
| 1897 | Bill Proudfoot | 108 | 0 | 1897–1906 |
| 1897 | Charlie Sime | 64 | 4 | 1897–1901 |
| 1897 | Archie Smith | 89 | 119 | 1897–1902 |
| 1897 | Bill Strickland | 16 | 0 | 1897 |
| 1897 | Lardie Tulloch | 129 | 67 | 1897–1904 |
| 1897 | George Williams | 55 | 0 | 1897–1901 |
| 1897 | Alby Tame | 29 | 2 | 1897, 1899–1900, 1902 |
| 1897 | Jim Dowdall | 6 | 1 | 1897 |
| 1897 | Dick Hall | 1 | 0 | 1897 |
| 1897 | Fred Kay | 11 | 6 | 1897–1898, 1901 |
| 1897 | Danny Flaherty | 4 | 0 | 1897 |
| 1897 | Denis Lanigan | 11 | 3 | 1897 |
| 1897 | Fred Leach | 84 | 8 | 1897–1903 |
| 1897 | Herman Hellwig | 21 | 3 | 1897–1899 |
| 1897 | Tom Lee | 8 | 2 | 1897–1898 |
| 1897 | Herb Johnson | 1 | 0 | 1897 |
| 1897 | Bill Stranger | 17 | 2 | 1897–1898 |
| 1898 | George Cowell | 11 | 2 | 1898 |
| 1898 | Matthew Fell | 116 | 21 | 1898–1905 |
| 1898 | Bill Kennedy | 19 | 1 | 1898–1899 |
| 1898 | Mick Lynch | 14 | 15 | 1898 |
| 1898 | Bobby McCubbin | 6 | 0 | 1898 |
| 1898 | Arthur Leach | 173 | 92 | 1898–1908 |
| 1898 | Bob Bird | 1 | 1 | 1898 |
| 1899 | Tom Carmody | 8 | 3 | 1899–1900, 1903 |
| 1899 | Pat Fitzgerald | 1 | 0 | 1899 |
| 1899 | Jack Geddes | 2 | 0 | 1899 |
| 1899 | Alf Catlin | 9 | 4 | 1899 |
| 1899 | Bob Rush | 143 | 1 | 1899–1908 |
| 1899 | Jimmy Ryan | 2 | 0 | 1899 |
| 1899 | Albert Walsh | 2 | 0 | 1899–1900 |
| 1899 | Wilfred Fell | 7 | 0 | 1899 |
| 1899 | Johnny Lyons | 16 | 12 | 1899–1900 |
| 1899 | Jack Denning | 2 | 1 | 1899 |
| 1899 | Doug Watsford | 21 | 7 | 1899–1900 |
| 1900 | Owen Brennan | 11 | 2 | 1900 |
| 1900 | Roland Duncan | 8 | 5 | 1900 |
| 1900 | Stan Watsford | 2 | 0 | 1900 |
| 1900 | Eddie Harris | 1 | 0 | 1900 |
| 1900 | Ted Burke | 3 | 0 | 1900 |
| 1900 | Pat Cleary | 3 | 0 | 1900 |
| 1900 | John Parish | 3 | 0 | 1900 |
| 1900 | Ted Absolom | 11 | 3 | 1900 |
| 1900 | Tom McLean | 5 | 3 | 1900 |
| 1900 | Arthur Robson | 14 | 15 | 1900–1901 |
| 1900 | Bob Carmichael | 1 | 0 | 1900 |
| 1900 | Charles Langtree | 1 | 0 | 1900 |
| 1900 | Joe Rouse | 6 | 4 | 1900–1901 |
| 1901 | Alf Boyack | 23 | 3 | 1901–1902 |
| 1901 | Bob Bryce | 13 | 11 | 1901–1902 |
| 1901 | Alf Dummett | 118 | 10 | 1901–1910 |
| 1901 | Jack Farrell | 22 | 6 | 1901–1902 |
| 1901 | Peter Martin | 15 | 2 | 1901–1902 |
| 1901 | Bill McCulloch | 12 | 5 | 1901–1902 |
| 1901 | Leo S. Morgan | 19 | 6 | 1901–1902 |
| 1901 | Ted Rowell | 189 | 175 | 1901–1903, 1906–1915 |
| 1901 | Oscar Hyman | 41 | 12 | 1901, 1905–1906 |
| 1901 | George Ashman | 3 | 1 | 1901 |
| 1901 | Harry Knell | 1 | 0 | 1901 |
| 1901 | Ted Leach | 22 | 9 | 1901–1903 |
| 1901 | George Blundell | 1 | 1 | 1901 |
| 1902 | John Allan | 19 | 9 | 1902–1903 |
| 1902 | Jack Incoll | 68 | 44 | 1902–1906 |
| 1902 | Con McCormack | 31 | 0 | 1902–1903 |
| 1902 | Harry Newbound | 1 | 0 | 1902 |
| 1902 | Harry Pears | 95 | 78 | 1902–1908 |
| 1902 | Teddy Lockwood | 53 | 83 | 1902–1905 |
| 1902 | George Lockwood | 29 | 2 | 1902–1904 |
| 1902 | George Angus | 157 | 64 | 1902–1911 |
| 1903 | Jock McHale | 261 | 18 | 1903–1918, 1920 |
| 1903 | Billy Spears | 6 | 2 | 1903 |
| 1903 | George Green | 76 | 16 | 1903–1908 |
| 1903 | Eddie Drohan | 96 | 54 | 1903–1908 |
| 1903 | Percy Wilmot | 1 | 1 | 1903 |
| 1903 | Johnny Dunn | 3 | 0 | 1903 |
| 1903 | Jim McKean | 1 | 0 | 1903 |
| 1903 | Bill Ayling | 2 | 0 | 1903 |
| 1903 | Jim Blair | 1 | 0 | 1903 |
| 1903 | Jim Addison | 10 | 4 | 1903–1904 |
| 1904 | Bob Burns | 2 | 0 | 1904 |
| 1904 | Bill Homan | 12 | 8 | 1904–1905 |
| 1904 | Grahame McConechy | 7 | 6 | 1904 |
| 1904 | Bob Strachan | 52 | 27 | 1904–1908, 1910 |
| 1904 | Wally Sykes | 2 | 0 | 1904 |
| 1904 | Ivor Lawson | 7 | 2 | 1904 |
| 1904 | Darcy McDougall | 1 | 0 | 1904 |
| 1904 | Don Fraser | 31 | 0 | 1904–1906 |
| 1904 | Les Abbott | 1 | 0 | 1904 |
| 1904 | Harry Neil | 4 | 0 | 1904 |
| 1904 | Allan Belcher | 4 | 1 | 1904 |
| 1904 | Robert Nash | 88 | 14 | 1904–1909 |
| 1905 | Percy Gibb | 157 | 10 | 1905–1914 |
| 1905 | Fred Stancliffe | 12 | 6 | 1905–1907 |
| 1905 | George Marsh | 7 | 3 | 1905 |
| 1905 | Percy Ogden | 4 | 0 | 1905 |
| 1906 | Vic Hambridge | 8 | 3 | 1906–1907 |
| 1906 | Bert Reitman | 12 | 1 | 1906–1907 |
| 1906 | Bob Bowden | 1 | 0 | 1906 |
| 1906 | Alex Holland | 15 | 0 | 1906–1907 |
| 1906 | Bill Punch | 3 | 0 | 1906 |
| 1906 | Frank Gaudion | 3 | 1 | 1906 |
| 1906 | Frank Wilcher | 53 | 1 | 1906–1909 |
| 1906 | Johnny Hay | 19 | 2 | 1906–1907 |
| 1906 | Dick Lee | 230 | 707 | 1906–1922 |
| 1906 | Robert Michael | 1 | 0 | 1906 |
| 1906 | Tom Wright | 12 | 7 | 1906–1907 |
| 1906 | Tom Nelson | 3 | 0 | 1906 |
| 1907 | Tom Baxter | 89 | 74 | 1907–1911 |
| 1907 | Herbert Cheffers | 7 | 5 | 1907 |
| 1907 | Clarence Abbott | 2 | 0 | 1907 |
| 1907 | Orm Pleasents | 1 | 0 | 1907 |
| 1907 | Tommy Worle | 3 | 0 | 1907 |
| 1907 | Albert Pannam | 28 | 12 | 1907–1909 |
| 1907 | Ernie Rudduck | 14 | 3 | 1907 |
| 1907 | Dave Ryan | 99 | 72 | 1907–1912 |
| 1907 | Dave O'Donoghue | 53 | 0 | 1907–1911 |
| 1907 | Jim Baxter | 4 | 1 | 1907–1909 |
| 1907 | Graham Diggle | 13 | 1 | 1907–1909 |
| 1907 | Charlie Meadway | 3 | 0 | 1907 |
| 1908 | Bill Carden | 5 | 0 | 1908 |
| 1908 | Alex Dunstan | 10 | 2 | 1908 |
| 1908 | Bill Heatley | 50 | 19 | 1908–1911 |
| 1908 | Marshall Herbert | 51 | 8 | 1908–1910 |
| 1908 | Les Hughes | 225 | 175 | 1908–1922 |
| 1908 | Artie Freeman | 27 | 17 | 1908–1910 |
| 1908 | Mick Ryan | 1 | 0 | 1908 |
| 1908 | Harold Gyton | 9 | 1 | 1908 |
| 1908 | Jim Sadler | 135 | 5 | 1908–1917 |
| 1908 | Tom Holland | 5 | 0 | 1908 |
| 1908 | Harry Lees | 1 | 0 | 1908 |
| 1908 | Richard Daykin | 21 | 7 | 1908, 1910 |
| 1909 | Herbert Cock | 2 | 1 | 1909 |
| 1909 | Charlie Dummett | 4 | 3 | 1909, 1911 |
| 1909 | Dick Vernon | 51 | 12 | 1909–1911 |
| 1909 | Ernie Bailes | 2 | 0 | 1909 |
| 1909 | Lindsay Bristow | 2 | 0 | 1909 |
| 1909 | Wal Burleigh | 11 | 1 | 1909–1910 |
| 1909 | Duncan McIvor | 29 | 0 | 1909–1911, 1914 |
| 1909 | Percy Wilson | 183 | 71 | 1909–1920 |
| 1909 | Jack Shorten | 60 | 0 | 1909–1910, 1912–1913 |
| 1909 | Bert McKnight | 1 | 0 | 1909 |
| 1909 | Norm M. Oliver | 33 | 2 | 1909–1911 |
| 1910 | Sam Campbell | 1 | 0 | 1910 |
| 1910 | Andy Duff | 2 | 0 | 1910 |
| 1910 | Bertie McDougall | 1 | 0 | 1910 |
| 1910 | Joe Scaddan | 21 | 0 | 1910 |
| 1910 | Charlie Hackett | 9 | 0 | 1910 |
| 1910 | Jim Jackson | 93 | 22 | 1910–1915, 1920 |
| 1910 | Horrie Jones | 14 | 2 | 1910–1911 |
| 1910 | Ned Harper | 1 | 0 | 1910 |
| 1910 | Charlie Norris | 18 | 4 | 1910–1911 |
| 1910 | Ernie Lumsden | 78 | 57 | 1910–1912, 1917–1920 |
| 1910 | Roy Crisp | 1 | 0 | 1910 |
| 1910 | Paddy Gilchrist | 37 | 37 | 1910–1913 |
| 1911 | Dan Minogue | 85 | 37 | 1911–1916 |
| 1911 | Alec Mutch | 144 | 5 | 1911–1921 |
| 1911 | Jack Sheehan | 3 | 0 | 1911 |
| 1911 | John Somer | 1 | 0 | 1911 |
| 1911 | Billy Holmes | 1 | 0 | 1911 |
| 1911 | Jack W. Green | 108 | 6 | 1911–1918 |
| 1911 | Billy Hammond | 4 | 1 | 1911 |
| 1911 | Paddy Rowan | 82 | 28 | 1911–1915 |
| 1911 | George Anderson | 104 | 8 | 1911–1917 |
| 1911 | Jim Sharp | 18 | 0 | 1911–1912, 1917 |
| 1911 | Mal Seddon | 102 | 56 | 1911–1915, 1919–1921 |
| 1911 | Eddie Thomas | 7 | 1 | 1911 |
| 1912 | Len Gibb | 9 | 1 | 1912 |
| 1912 | Victor Jackson | 3 | 0 | 1912 |
| 1912 | Charlie Laxton | 147 | 89 | 1912–1921 |
| 1912 | Jack Lowe | 25 | 24 | 1912–1913 |
| 1912 | Art Wilkinson | 11 | 8 | 1912 |
| 1912 | Roy Gray | 18 | 20 | 1912–1913 |
| 1912 | Ted Prendergast | 5 | 4 | 1912 |
| 1912 | Fred Parkinson | 5 | 3 | 1912 |
| 1912 | Jim Ambler | 6 | 5 | 1912 |
| 1912 | Tommy Cockram | 7 | 8 | 1912 |
| 1912 | Bill Cooke | 1 | 1 | 1912 |
| 1912 | Lance Mounsey | 4 | 0 | 1912 |
| 1912 | Jimmy Seaton | 1 | 2 | 1912 |
| 1913 | Fred Fielding | 17 | 10 | 1913 |
| 1913 | George Goodall | 3 | 0 | 1913–1914 |
| 1913 | Reg Gibb | 20 | 5 | 1913–1914 |
| 1913 | Alan Cordner | 20 | 2 | 1913–1914 |
| 1913 | Cyril Suares | 4 | 0 | 1913 |
| 1913 | Bert McDonald | 3 | 4 | 1913 |
| 1913 | Bryan Rush | 17 | 17 | 1913–1914 |
| 1913 | Wally Raleigh | 6 | 0 | 1913–1915 |
| 1913 | Pen Reynolds | 87 | 16 | 1913–1919 |
| 1914 | Colin Dufty | 1 | 1 | 1914 |
| 1914 | Les Huntington | 4 | 0 | 1914 |
| 1914 | Gus Dobrigh | 88 | 33 | 1914–1921 |
| 1914 | Max Hislop | 9 | 4 | 1914 |
| 1914 | Maurie Sheehy | 110 | 22 | 1914, 1916–1922 |
| 1914 | Harry Matheson | 9 | 8 | 1914 |
| 1914 | Tom Pollard | 6 | 2 | 1914 |
| 1914 | Charlie Mutch | 3 | 0 | 1914 |
| 1914 | Harry Curtis | 122 | 149 | 1914–1923 |
| 1915 | Horrie Jose | 17 | 2 | 1915–1917, 1919 |
| 1915 | Con McCarthy | 101 | 22 | 1915–1921 |
| 1915 | Sam Mortimer | 10 | 0 | 1915 |
| 1915 | Arthur Whitling | 1 | 0 | 1915 |
| 1915 | Harry Kerley | 12 | 21 | 1915 |
| 1915 | Vernon Carkeek | 3 | 1 | 1915–1916 |
| 1915 | Tom Clancy | 18 | 0 | 1915–1916 |
| 1916 | Charlie Brown | 107 | 2 | 1916–1923 |
| 1916 | Matt Cody | 12 | 2 | 1916–1917 |
| 1916 | Tom Wraith | 60 | 88 | 1916–1920 |
| 1916 | Charlie Lee | 47 | 13 | 1916–1919, 1923 |
| 1916 | Les Oram | 7 | 4 | 1916 |
| 1916 | Harry Saunders | 135 | 10 | 1916–1926 |
| 1916 | Percy Yates | 2 | 0 | 1916 |
| 1916 | Tom Drummond | 94 | 6 | 1916–1922 |
| 1916 | Bert Colechin | 57 | 2 | 1916–1921 |
| 1917 | Sam MacKechnie | 14 | 1 | 1917–1918 |
| 1917 | Charlie E. Pannam | 97 | 12 | 1917–1922 |
| 1917 | Harrie Cross | 1 | 1 | 1917 |
| 1918 | Michael Maguire | 9 | 10 | 1918 |
| 1918 | Stan McKenzie | 9 | 0 | 1918 |
| 1918 | Jack O'Connor | 3 | 1 | 1918 |
| 1918 | Bill Walton | 27 | 17 | 1918–1919 |
| 1918 | Stan Yates | 8 | 6 | 1918 |
| 1918 | Bill Twomey Sr. | 54 | 5 | 1918–1922 |
| 1919 | Ernie Wilson | 126 | 9 | 1919–1928 |
| 1919 | Wally Haysom | 23 | 1 | 1919–1920 |
| 1919 | George Youren | 3 | 1 | 1919 |
| 1919 | Ern Utting | 16 | 29 | 1919–1920, 1922 |
| 1920 | Bill Buck | 32 | 1 | 1920–1924 |
| 1920 | Artie Dillon | 2 | 0 | 1920 |
| 1920 | Charlie Tyson | 106 | 42 | 1920–1926 |
| 1920 | Les Lobb | 5 | 0 | 1920 |
| 1920 | Percy Rowe | 96 | 37 | 1920–1924, 1927–1928 |
| 1920 | Gordon Coventry | 306 | 1299 | 1920–1937 |
| 1920 | Len Ludbrooke | 4 | 3 | 1920–1921 |
| 1920 | Roy Outram | 1 | 0 | 1920 |
| 1921 | Reynolds Webb | 84 | 65 | 1921–1926 |
| 1921 | Jim Keogh | 4 | 0 | 1921 |
| 1921 | Tom Hammond | 18 | 4 | 1921–1923 |
| 1921 | Laurie Murphy | 78 | 14 | 1921–1926 |
| 1921 | Fred Petterson | 5 | 1 | 1921 |
| 1921 | Harry Lloyd | 1 | 0 | 1921 |
| 1921 | Tommy Scanlon | 5 | 2 | 1921 |
| 1921 | Clyde Smith | 7 | 0 | 1921 |
| 1922 | Ted Baker | 43 | 33 | 1922–1923, 1932 |
| 1922 | Syd Coventry | 227 | 62 | 1922–1934 |
| 1922 | Bill Glynn | 9 | 4 | 1922–1923 |
| 1922 | Frank Plant | 1 | 0 | 1922 |
| 1922 | George Tory | 2 | 1 | 1922 |
| 1922 | Charles Wall | 1 | 0 | 1922 |
| 1922 | Leo Wescott | 143 | 3 | 1922–1927, 1929, 1931–1932 |
| 1922 | Fred Keays | 3 | 0 | 1922 |
| 1922 | Clem Splatt | 2 | 0 | 1922 |
| 1922 | Eric Cock | 36 | 40 | 1922–1924 |
| 1922 | Rupe Hannah | 14 | 0 | 1922–1924 |
| 1922 | Hector Lingwood-Smith | 13 | 1 | 1922–1923 |
| 1922 | Reg Baker | 60 | 60 | 1922–1926, 1928 |
| 1922 | Harry Chesswas | 154 | 45 | 1922–1931 |
| 1923 | Joe Poulter | 83 | 31 | 1923–1928 |
| 1923 | Jack Benson | 10 | 0 | 1923–1924 |
| 1923 | Jim Lawn | 35 | 37 | 1923–1925 |
| 1923 | Charlie Milburn | 60 | 3 | 1923–1927 |
| 1923 | Bob Makeham | 157 | 97 | 1923–1932 |
| 1923 | Noel McCamish | 2 | 0 | 1923 |
| 1923 | Herbie Taylor | 5 | 5 | 1923 |
| 1924 | Vin Batchelor | 2 | 0 | 1924 |
| 1924 | Syd Burt | 10 | 1 | 1924–1925 |
| 1924 | Bill Whitbourne | 4 | 1 | 1924 |
| 1924 | Roy Allen | 2 | 0 | 1924 |
| 1924 | George Clayden | 134 | 79 | 1924–1933 |
| 1924 | Charlie Dibbs | 216 | 1 | 1924–1935 |
| 1924 | George Beasley | 38 | 17 | 1924–1928 |
| 1924 | Fred Mutch | 3 | 0 | 1924 |
| 1924 | Jim Shanahan | 42 | 0 | 1924–1926 |
| 1924 | Billy Pardon | 1 | 0 | 1924 |
| 1924 | Bill Buckley | 2 | 0 | 1924 |
| 1924 | Jack Monohan Jr. | 7 | 3 | 1924–1925 |
| 1924 | Gordon Davie | 2 | 0 | 1924 |
| 1924 | Jack Jobson | 6 | 2 | 1924–1925 |
| 1925 | Bill Barry | 4 | 0 | 1925 |
| 1925 | Albert Collier | 205 | 54 | 1925–1930, 1933–1939 |
| 1925 | Billy Libbis | 138 | 150 | 1925–1933 |
| 1925 | Reg Boyle | 3 | 0 | 1925, 1932 |
| 1925 | John Harris | 88 | 48 | 1925–1929 |
| 1925 | Bill Henry | 2 | 0 | 1925 |
| 1925 | Les Stainsby | 23 | 35 | 1925–1926 |
| 1925 | Frank Murphy | 145 | 121 | 1925–1934 |
| 1925 | Thomas Bird | 9 | 5 | 1925, 1928 |
| 1925 | Fred Barker | 2 | 0 | 1925–1926 |
| 1926 | Jack Beveridge | 148 | 44 | 1926–1934 |
| 1926 | Harry Collier | 253 | 299 | 1926–1940 |
| 1926 | Bill Sneazwell | 20 | 0 | 1926–1928 |
| 1926 | Albert Lauder | 36 | 0 | 1926–1931 |
| 1926 | Keith Osmond | 4 | 0 | 1926 |
| 1926 | Alf Sparks | 3 | 0 | 1926 |
| 1927 | Norm MacLeod | 58 | 0 | 1927–1932 |
| 1927 | Bob Muir | 33 | 4 | 1927–1929, 1931–1932 |
| 1927 | Trevor Rowlands | 2 | 0 | 1927 |
| 1927 | Harold Rumney | 171 | 28 | 1927–1935, 1937 |
| 1927 | Clarrie Morelli | 7 | 1 | 1927 |
| 1927 | Hector Ross | 2 | 0 | 1927 |
| 1927 | Les Hughson | 1 | 1 | 1927 |
| 1928 | Percy Bowyer | 154 | 33 | 1928–1938 |
| 1928 | Len Murphy | 173 | 105 | 1928–1937 |
| 1928 | Les Angus | 9 | 1 | 1928 |
| 1928 | Cyril Kent | 1 | 0 | 1928 |
| 1928 | Les Thomas | 2 | 0 | 1928 |
| 1928 | Bruce Andrew | 62 | 11 | 1928–1932, 1934 |
| 1929 | George Gibbs | 27 | 16 | 1929–1930 |
| 1929 | Charlie Ahern | 3 | 0 | 1929 |
| 1929 | Ken Veevers | 1 | 0 | 1929 |
| 1929 | Bob Ross | 10 | 10 | 1929–1931 |
| 1929 | Leo Bird | 16 | 10 | 1929–1930 |
| 1929 | Horace Edmonds | 79 | 124 | 1929–1934 |
| 1930 | Elvin Barr | 9 | 3 | 1930, 1932 |
| 1930 | Jack Regan | 196 | 3 | 1930–1941, 1943, 1946 |
| 1930 | Fred Froude | 148 | 41 | 1930–1939 |
| 1930 | Bert Everett | 4 | 0 | 1930 |
| 1930 | Frank Kelly | 34 | 8 | 1930–1931, 1933 |
| 1930 | Jack George | 7 | 0 | 1930–1931 |
| 1930 | Bill Aldag | 9 | 0 | 1930–1931 |
| 1931 | Don Harris | 32 | 3 | 1931–1932 |
| 1931 | Jack Ross | 142 | 30 | 1931–1940 |
| 1931 | George Tatham | 23 | 16 | 1931, 1933 |
| 1931 | Clarrie Tolson | 7 | 2 | 1931 |
| 1931 | Les Ames | 3 | 5 | 1931 |
| 1931 | Rupe Perrett | 2 | 0 | 1931 |
| 1932 | Dick Grant | 2 | 1 | 1932 |
| 1932 | George Carter | 49 | 60 | 1932–1937 |
| 1932 | Alan Hammond | 6 | 1 | 1932–1933 |
| 1932 | Les Harvey | 4 | 0 | 1932 |
| 1932 | Jack Lyngcoln | 3 | 0 | 1932 |
| 1932 | Ernie Nunn | 5 | 1 | 1932 |
| 1932 | Tom Tucker | 2 | 0 | 1932 |
| 1932 | Leslie Watt | 2 | 0 | 1932 |
| 1932 | Bill Munn | 9 | 1 | 1932–1933 |
| 1932 | Ken Rosewarne | 2 | 2 | 1932 |
| 1932 | Eric Dalton | 3 | 2 | 1932 |
| 1932 | Tom Hallahan | 9 | 9 | 1932 |
| 1932 | Clem Morden | 3 | 0 | 1932 |
| 1933 | Noel Burrows | 1 | 0 | 1933 |
| 1933 | Albert Downs | 1 | 0 | 1933 |
| 1933 | Bernie Guthrie | 7 | 5 | 1933 |
| 1933 | Ivan McIntosh | 6 | 0 | 1933 |
| 1933 | Frank Slade | 2 | 0 | 1933 |
| 1933 | Alfred Andrew-Street | 6 | 0 | 1933–1934 |
| 1933 | Jack Carmody | 94 | 12 | 1933–1939 |
| 1933 | Keith Fraser | 62 | 9 | 1933–1936 |
| 1933 | Keith Kent | 5 | 0 | 1933 |
| 1933 | Norm Le Brun | 19 | 23 | 1933–1934 |
| 1933 | Marcus Whelan | 173 | 31 | 1933–1942, 1946–1947 |
| 1933 | Reg Gibson | 16 | 6 | 1933, 1935–1936 |
| 1933 | Lou Daily | 7 | 7 | 1933 |
| 1933 | George Bates | 1 | 0 | 1933 |
| 1933 | Max Turner | 2 | 0 | 1933 |
| 1933 | Alby Pannam | 181 | 453 | 1933–1943, 1945 |
| 1933 | Leo W. Morgan | 82 | 7 | 1933–1941 |
| 1933 | John Galbally | 7 | 0 | 1933–1934 |
| 1934 | Vin Doherty | 96 | 122 | 1934–1939 |
| 1934 | Jack Knight | 104 | 85 | 1934–1940 |
| 1934 | Phonse Kyne | 245 | 237 | 1934–1944, 1946–1950 |
| 1934 | Alan Ryan | 29 | 5 | 1934–1938 |
| 1934 | Wally Tyrrell | 1 | 0 | 1934 |
| 1934 | Frank Asling | 5 | 1 | 1934 |
| 1934 | Alec Fyfe | 11 | 3 | 1934–1935 |
| 1934 | Jack Twyford | 2 | 0 | 1934 |
| 1934 | Lou Riley | 44 | 60 | 1934–1938 |
| 1934 | Selwyn Baker | 1 | 1 | 1934 |
| 1935 | Tommy Boag | 1 | 0 | 1935 |
| 1935 | Bervin Woods | 110 | 6 | 1935–1940 |
| 1935 | Pat Fricker | 71 | 18 | 1935–1941, 1944 |
| 1935 | Harold Albiston | 1 | 0 | 1935 |
| 1935 | Eddie Gray | 1 | 0 | 1935 |
| 1935 | Jack Power | 3 | 0 | 1935 |
| 1935 | Keith Stackpole | 34 | 26 | 1935–1939 |
| 1935 | Ron Todd | 76 | 327 | 1935–1939 |
| 1935 | George Kanngieser | 1 | 0 | 1935 |
| 1935 | Marcus Boyall | 50 | 29 | 1935–1938, 1942, 1944–1945 |
| 1936 | Ron Dowling | 72 | 9 | 1936–1940 |
| 1936 | Jim Crowe | 21 | 0 | 1936–1937 |
| 1936 | Ron McCann | 1 | 0 | 1936 |
| 1936 | Harry Jones | 17 | 8 | 1936–1938 |
| 1937 | Des Fothergill | 111 | 337 | 1937–1940, 1945–1947 |
| 1937 | Jack Murphy | 160 | 44 | 1937–1947 |
| 1938 | Frank Booth | 6 | 2 | 1938 |
| 1938 | Clarrie Shields | 7 | 0 | 1938–1939 |
| 1938 | Harold Powell | 40 | 41 | 1938–1940 |
| 1938 | Herb Naismith | 75 | 15 | 1938–1946 |
| 1938 | Alan Williams | 115 | 91 | 1938–1945 |
| 1938 | Fred Pearce | 4 | 1 | 1938 |
| 1938 | Stan Dawson | 21 | 21 | 1938–1941 |
| 1938 | Don Balfour | 71 | 29 | 1938–1941, 1943–1945 |
| 1938 | Gordon Hocking | 171 | 78 | 1938–1941, 1943–1952 |
| 1938 | Bill Unwin | 23 | 6 | 1938–1941 |
| 1938 | Jack T. Green | 127 | 63 | 1938–1941, 1943–1949 |
| 1939 | Norm Campbell | 68 | 1 | 1939–1942, 1946 |
| 1939 | Ted Hill | 2 | 0 | 1939 |
| 1939 | Jock Morison | 5 | 0 | 1939 |
| 1939 | Les Hill | 13 | 1 | 1939–1940 |
| 1939 | Cliff MacRae | 3 | 7 | 1939 |
| 1940 | Kevin Barrett | 4 | 4 | 1940 |
| 1940 | Dan Knott | 18 | 2 | 1940–1941, 1943 |
| 1940 | Charlie Newman | 17 | 0 | 1940–1942 |
| 1940 | Colin Campbell | 17 | 4 | 1940–1941 |
| 1940 | Jack Pimm | 58 | 113 | 1940, 1946–1950 |
| 1940 | Ken Williams | 12 | 2 | 1940 |
| 1940 | Bennie Le Sueur | 3 | 0 | 1940 |
| 1940 | Bill Noonan | 42 | 16 | 1940–1941, 1944, 1946 |
| 1940 | Leo Tyrrell | 2 | 0 | 1940, 1942 |
| 1940 | Geoff Nicholls | 2 | 2 | 1940 |
| 1940 | Ron H. Carruthers | 48 | 3 | 1940, 1942–1947 |
| 1940 | Harry Mears | 62 | 61 | 1940–1946 |
| 1940 | Norm L. Oliver | 13 | 2 | 1940–1941 |
| 1941 | Bill Johnstone | 2 | 0 | 1941 |
| 1941 | John McHale | 34 | 28 | 1941, 1943–1944 |
| 1941 | Ted Ryan | 33 | 2 | 1941, 1944, 1946–1947 |
| 1941 | Les Main | 21 | 26 | 1941–1943 |
| 1941 | Ron Smith | 48 | 1 | 1941–1943, 1945–1947 |
| 1941 | Kevin Sullivan | 13 | 1 | 1941, 1943, 1946 |
| 1941 | Phil Busbridge | 14 | 0 | 1941–1943 |
| 1941 | Norm Crewther | 14 | 5 | 1941–1943 |
| 1941 | Lou Richards | 250 | 423 | 1941–1955 |
| 1941 | Hugh Coventry | 8 | 11 | 1941 |
| 1941 | Jack Burns | 92 | 14 | 1941–1947 |
| 1941 | Clarrie Swenson | 4 | 4 | 1941, 1946 |
| 1941 | Pat Dalton | 32 | 7 | 1941–1945 |
| 1941 | Harry Lambert | 27 | 48 | 1941–1942, 1944, 1946–1947 |
| 1942 | Jack Arnott | 8 | 14 | 1942–1944 |
| 1942 | Frank Galbally | 6 | 0 | 1942 |
| 1942 | Neil McIntosh | 21 | 10 | 1942–1944 |
| 1942 | Joe Toleman | 9 | 16 | 1942, 1944, 1946 |
| 1942 | Kevin Wade | 111 | 20 | 1942–1949 |
| 1942 | Tom Wallis | 78 | 2 | 1942–1947 |
| 1942 | Ken Herbert | 20 | 2 | 1942–1945 |
| 1942 | Len Hustler | 8 | 7 | 1942–1943, 1945 |
| 1942 | Bill Seedsman | 1 | 0 | 1942 |
| 1942 | Des Negri | 30 | 1 | 1942–1945 |
| 1942 | Keith Milte | 10 | 7 | 1942–1943 |
| 1942 | Mick Donohue | 12 | 3 | 1942–1943 |
| 1942 | Roy Stabb | 12 | 4 | 1942–1944 |
| 1942 | Reg Ryan | 6 | 0 | 1942 |
| 1942 | Fred Stabb | 12 | 0 | 1942–1944 |
| 1942 | Phil Ryan | 74 | 48 | 1942–1947 |
| 1942 | Ron Dean | 1 | 0 | 1942 |
| 1942 | Mac Holten | 79 | 83 | 1942–1948 |
| 1942 | George Wilson | 10 | 0 | 1942–1943 |
| 1943 | Dick Allen | 3 | 2 | 1943 |
| 1943 | Bill Crane | 4 | 0 | 1943 |
| 1943 | Leo McPartland | 4 | 1 | 1943 |
| 1943 | Frank Negri | 6 | 0 | 1943 |
| 1943 | Doug Smith | 2 | 0 | 1943 |
| 1943 | Merv Harvey | 1 | 1 | 1943 |
| 1943 | Bill Brown | 2 | 0 | 1943 |
| 1943 | Clive Reid | 2 | 0 | 1943 |
| 1943 | Jim Bradford | 7 | 16 | 1943 |
| 1943 | Frank Kirwin | 3 | 0 | 1943 |
| 1943 | Charlie Utting | 125 | 17 | 1943–1950 |
| 1943 | Leo Hicks | 1 | 1 | 1943 |
| 1943 | Alex Moore | 2 | 0 | 1943 |
| 1943 | Bill Duckworth | 2 | 2 | 1943–1944 |
| 1944 | Bill Dalkin | 30 | 10 | 1944–1945 |
| 1944 | George Nelson | 24 | 1 | 1944–1945 |
| 1944 | Dave Newman | 49 | 32 | 1944–1947 |
| 1944 | Ron Hibbert | 5 | 2 | 1944 |
| 1944 | Jim Tibballs | 4 | 1 | 1944 |
| 1944 | Bob Galbally | 8 | 26 | 1944 |
| 1944 | Jack Synon | 7 | 0 | 1944 |
| 1944 | Arthur Robbins | 2 | 0 | 1944 |
| 1944 | Ray Riddell | 5 | 0 | 1944–1946 |
| 1944 | Jack Nilson | 4 | 0 | 1944 |
| 1945 | Allan Brown | 16 | 11 | 1945–1946 |
| 1945 | Len Fitzgerald | 96 | 49 | 1945–1950 |
| 1945 | Neil Mann | 179 | 155 | 1945–1956 |
| 1945 | Bill Twomey Jr. | 189 | 154 | 1945–1958 |
| 1945 | Ernie Eiffler | 3 | 0 | 1945 |
| 1945 | Laurie Gallagher | 1 | 0 | 1945 |
| 1945 | Peter McLaren | 1 | 0 | 1945 |
| 1945 | Murray Murrell | 2 | 0 | 1945 |
| 1945 | Jack Carroll | 2 | 0 | 1945 |
| 1945 | Guy Moore | 36 | 42 | 1945–1949 |
| 1946 | Ray Horwood | 55 | 13 | 1946–1949, 1954 |
| 1946 | Allan Knorr | 9 | 1 | 1946 |
| 1946 | Raymond Jones | 22 | 0 | 1946–1948 |
| 1946 | Bob Rose | 152 | 214 | 1946–1955 |
| 1946 | Laurie Yates | 1 | 0 | 1946 |
| 1947 | Bill Nolan | 60 | 0 | 1947–1951 |
| 1947 | Stan Smith | 46 | 25 | 1947–1950 |
| 1947 | Alex Denney | 35 | 2 | 1947–1948 |
| 1947 | Ray Keegan | 16 | 10 | 1947–1948 |
| 1947 | Stan Moon | 7 | 4 | 1947 |
| 1947 | Pat Twomey | 55 | 49 | 1947–1949, 1952–1953 |
| 1947 | Ron Richards | 143 | 114 | 1947–1956 |
| 1948 | Geoff Brokenshire | 13 | 19 | 1948 |
| 1948 | Des Healey | 149 | 37 | 1948–1955 |
| 1948 | Jack Sales | 31 | 2 | 1948–1949 |
| 1948 | Jack Thompson | 51 | 24 | 1948–1951 |
| 1948 | Frank Corby | 6 | 1 | 1948 |
| 1948 | George Hams | 108 | 3 | 1948–1955 |
| 1948 | Max Horder | 6 | 2 | 1948 |
| 1948 | Jack Hamilton | 154 | 16 | 1948–1957 |
| 1948 | Ernest McIntyre | 12 | 17 | 1948–1949 |
| 1948 | Reg Meese | 1 | 0 | 1948 |
| 1948 | Harvey Stevens | 54 | 56 | 1948–1952 |
| 1948 | Vic Donald | 10 | 3 | 1948–1949 |
| 1949 | Maurie Dunstan | 72 | 118 | 1949–1954 |
| 1949 | Bernie Shannon | 37 | 44 | 1949–1951 |
| 1949 | Les Thompson | 9 | 0 | 1949–1950 |
| 1949 | Neville Broderick | 24 | 3 | 1949–1951 |
| 1949 | Peter Lucas | 177 | 1 | 1949–1959 |
| 1949 | Kevin Coghlan | 31 | 25 | 1949–1952 |
| 1950 | Kevin Darrigan | 9 | 0 | 1950–1951 |
| 1950 | Harry Paynter | 1 | 0 | 1950 |
| 1950 | Bill Rose | 40 | 3 | 1950–1955 |
| 1950 | Fred West | 17 | 4 | 1950, 1953 |
| 1950 | Dave Morgan | 1 | 0 | 1950 |
| 1950 | Bill Welsh | 8 | 8 | 1950 |
| 1950 | Neville Swan | 25 | 0 | 1950–1952 |
| 1950 | Bill Tebble | 57 | 8 | 1950–1953 |
| 1950 | Frank Tuck | 131 | 34 | 1950–1959 |
| 1950 | Jack Purdon | 25 | 30 | 1950–1951 |
| 1950 | Thorold Merrett | 180 | 148 | 1950–1960 |
| 1950 | Arthur Gooch | 76 | 12 | 1950–1956 |
| 1950 | Ron Kingston | 173 | 7 | 1950–1959 |
| 1950 | Mac Hill | 2 | 0 | 1950 |
| 1951 | Col Davey | 30 | 34 | 1951–1952 |
| 1951 | Jack Finck | 53 | 8 | 1951–1954 |
| 1951 | Mick Twomey | 157 | 94 | 1951–1961 |
| 1951 | Don Caudwell | 1 | 0 | 1951 |
| 1951 | Jack Hickey | 72 | 15 | 1951–1956 |
| 1951 | Ivan Clues | 2 | 0 | 1951 |
| 1951 | Jack Parker | 59 | 11 | 1951–1955 |
| 1951 | Alan McGowan | 1 | 0 | 1951 |
| 1952 | Ken Aitken | 17 | 1 | 1952 |
| 1952 | Brian Turner | 38 | 11 | 1952, 1954–1957 |
| 1952 | Roy Williams | 8 | 7 | 1952 |
| 1952 | Kevin Flint | 4 | 3 | 1952–1953 |
| 1952 | Keith Schow | 1 | 0 | 1952 |
| 1952 | Ron McKenzie | 4 | 0 | 1952 |
| 1952 | Kevin Phillips | 2 | 3 | 1952 |
| 1952 | Les Smith | 5 | 0 | 1952, 1954 |
| 1952 | Keith Batchelor | 21 | 17 | 1952–1955 |
| 1953 | Dave Little | 10 | 1 | 1953–1955 |
| 1953 | Kevin Clarke | 18 | 7 | 1953–1954 |
| 1953 | Tom Tarrant | 7 | 1 | 1953–1954 |
| 1953 | Neville Waller | 84 | 21 | 1953–1958 |
| 1953 | Lerrel Sharp | 87 | 1 | 1953–1959 |
| 1953 | Terry Waites | 12 | 1 | 1953–1954 |
| 1953 | Pat Milburn | 6 | 3 | 1953 |
| 1953 | Murray Weideman | 180 | 262 | 1953–1963 |
| 1953 | Keith Bromage | 28 | 30 | 1953–1956 |
| 1954 | Alan Young | 3 | 1 | 1954 |
| 1954 | Jim Hower | 14 | 12 | 1954–1955 |
| 1954 | Brian Dorman | 51 | 28 | 1954–1956, 1958–1960 |
| 1954 | Don Walsh | 6 | 0 | 1954–1955 |
| 1954 | Syd Coventry Jr. | 7 | 0 | 1954 |
| 1954 | Kevin Wylie | 12 | 12 | 1954–1956 |
| 1954 | Bob Kupsch | 18 | 4 | 1954–1957 |
| 1954 | Bill Jones | 60 | 58 | 1954–1958 |
| 1955 | John Elder | 2 | 0 | 1955 |
| 1955 | Ken Smale | 60 | 98 | 1955–1958 |
| 1955 | Harry Sullivan | 78 | 5 | 1955–1960 |
| 1955 | Ray Gabelich | 160 | 43 | 1955–1960, 1962–1966 |
| 1955 | Laurie Rymer | 25 | 10 | 1955–1957 |
| 1955 | Bob Greve | 67 | 20 | 1955–1959 |
| 1956 | Brian Gray | 111 | 45 | 1956–1965 |
| 1956 | Dick O'Bree | 4 | 5 | 1956–1957 |
| 1956 | Bill Serong | 98 | 52 | 1956–1961 |
| 1956 | Ken Hedt | 20 | 6 | 1956 |
| 1956 | Max Davidson | 16 | 7 | 1956 |
| 1956 | Ken Turner | 170 | 56 | 1956–1965 |
| 1956 | Graham Borrack | 1 | 0 | 1956 |
| 1956 | Merv Hicks | 6 | 7 | 1956, 1959 |
| 1956 | Ian Brewer | 84 | 164 | 1956–1961 |
| 1956 | Graeme Fellowes | 66 | 22 | 1956–1964 |
| 1957 | Don Howell | 17 | 2 | 1957–1958 |
| 1957 | Lloyd Williams | 2 | 0 | 1957 |
| 1957 | Mike Delanty | 87 | 19 | 1957–1962 |
| 1957 | Bob Norman | 9 | 9 | 1957 |
| 1957 | Kevin Bergin | 5 | 4 | 1957 |
| 1957 | John Powell | 6 | 2 | 1957–1959 |
| 1957 | Brian Renwood | 3 | 0 | 1957 |
| 1957 | Keith Burns | 28 | 32 | 1957–1961 |
| 1957 | Dave Burt | 1 | 0 | 1957 |
| 1957 | Tony Heath | 2 | 2 | 1957 |
| 1957 | Ken Bennett | 56 | 37 | 1957–1962 |
| 1957 | John Henderson | 144 | 28 | 1957–1966 |
| 1957 | Ron Reeves | 122 | 2 | 1957–1965 |
| 1958 | Barry Donegan | 7 | 1 | 1958–1959 |
| 1958 | Barry Harrison | 56 | 24 | 1958–1961 |
| 1958 | Errol Hutchesson | 127 | 62 | 1958–1967 |
| 1958 | Don Dixon | 19 | 4 | 1958–1960 |
| 1958 | Eddie Millar | 5 | 1 | 1958–1959 |
| 1958 | Brian Beers | 60 | 72 | 1958–1961 |
| 1958 | Kevin Rose | 159 | 47 | 1958–1967 |
| 1958 | Keith Beckwith | 1 | 1 | 1958 |
| 1959 | Alan Wickes | 14 | 0 | 1959–1961 |
| 1959 | Bill Thripp | 46 | 4 | 1959–1962 |
| 1959 | Kevin Healy | 2 | 1 | 1959 |
| 1959 | Ron O'Dwyer | 27 | 15 | 1959–1961 |
| 1959 | John Carmody | 16 | 6 | 1959–1960 |
| 1959 | Peter Hayes | 2 | 0 | 1959–1960 |
| 1959 | Ray Murnane | 6 | 0 | 1959–1960 |
| 1960 | Bert Chapman | 68 | 35 | 1960, 1962–1966 |
| 1960 | Des Field | 2 | 0 | 1960 |
| 1960 | Peter Rosenbrock | 39 | 1 | 1960–1963 |
| 1960 | Kevin Pay | 19 | 31 | 1960–1962 |
| 1960 | Ray Willett | 20 | 17 | 1960–1961, 1964 |
| 1960 | Peter Weidemann | 5 | 0 | 1960–1961 |
| 1960 | Neville Withers | 41 | 7 | 1960–1963 |
| 1960 | Ian Abraham | 3 | 4 | 1960–1961 |
| 1960 | Graeme Jonson | 7 | 1 | 1960, 1962–1963 |
| 1960 | Duncan Wright | 23 | 1 | 1960, 1963–1965 |
| 1960 | John Hogan | 2 | 0 | 1960 |
| 1961 | Bob Delanty | 5 | 1 | 1961 |
| 1961 | John Mahon | 60 | 1 | 1961–1965 |
| 1961 | Trevor Steer | 88 | 45 | 1961–1966 |
| 1961 | David Norman | 91 | 148 | 1961–1966 |
| 1961 | Ray Thomas | 4 | 1 | 1961 |
| 1961 | Ron E. Carruthers | 8 | 1 | 1961 |
| 1961 | Warren Roper | 56 | 32 | 1961–1965, 1967 |
| 1961 | Fred Smith | 1 | 0 | 1961 |
| 1961 | Mike Heffernan | 2 | 0 | 1961 |
| 1961 | Barry Rist | 21 | 15 | 1961–1963 |
| 1961 | Robin Fildes | 14 | 2 | 1961–1963 |
| 1961 | Alan Poore | 11 | 5 | 1961–1962, 1964 |
| 1961 | Peter Marshall | 23 | 3 | 1961–1965 |
| 1961 | Dennis Bell | 2 | 1 | 1961 |
| 1961 | Barry Perry | 2 | 1 | 1961 |
| 1962 | Laurie Hill | 114 | 0 | 1962–1969 |
| 1962 | Ralph Rose | 23 | 9 | 1962–1963 |
| 1962 | Des Steele | 8 | 0 | 1962–1963 |
| 1962 | Mick Bone | 62 | 55 | 1962–1966 |
| 1962 | Mick Erwin | 29 | 4 | 1962–1965 |
| 1962 | Bob Johnstone | 14 | 11 | 1962–1963 |
| 1962 | John Knox | 27 | 6 | 1962–1964 |
| 1962 | Des Tuddenham | 182 | 251 | 1962–1971, 1976–1977 |
| 1963 | Terry Waters | 163 | 182 | 1963–1972 |
| 1963 | John Murton | 2 | 3 | 1963 |
| 1963 | Max Urquhart | 92 | 28 | 1963–1969 |
| 1963 | Ricky Watt | 95 | 17 | 1963–1964, 1966–1970 |
| 1963 | Kevin McLean | 33 | 1 | 1963–1965 |
| 1963 | Ted Potter | 182 | 0 | 1963–1972 |
| 1963 | Ian Graham | 63 | 131 | 1963–1966, 1969 |
| 1963 | Ernie Hug | 59 | 5 | 1963–1965, 1967–1970 |
| 1964 | Robert Longmire | 2 | 0 | 1964 |
| 1964 | Julian Vise | 5 | 3 | 1964 |
| 1964 | Paul Wadham | 21 | 9 | 1964–1965 |
| 1964 | Bob Farmer | 56 | 51 | 1964–1969 |
| 1964 | Graeme Jenkin | 127 | 77 | 1964, 1966–1973 |
| 1964 | Peter Boyne | 60 | 0 | 1964–1968 |
| 1964 | Denis Dalton | 9 | 6 | 1964–1965 |
| 1965 | Vaughan Ellis | 19 | 3 | 1965–1969 |
| 1965 | Peter McKenna | 180 | 838 | 1965–1975 |
| 1965 | Peter Patterson | 58 | 4 | 1965–1970 |
| 1965 | Colin Tully | 92 | 43 | 1965–1970 |
| 1965 | Kevin Huppatz | 1 | 0 | 1965 |
| 1965 | Ian Montgomery | 48 | 0 | 1965–1968 |
| 1965 | Len Clark | 14 | 0 | 1965–1969 |
| 1965 | Len Thompson | 268 | 217 | 1965–1978 |
| 1966 | Max Pitt | 27 | 7 | 1966–1968 |
| 1966 | Barry Price | 158 | 59 | 1966–1975, 1979 |
| 1966 | Wayne Richardson | 277 | 323 | 1966–1978 |
| 1966 | Gary Wallis | 33 | 34 | 1966–1968 |
| 1966 | Lee Adamson | 96 | 0 | 1966–1973 |
| 1966 | Max Ballantyne | 1 | 0 | 1966 |
| 1966 | Doug Searl | 12 | 20 | 1966–1968 |
| 1966 | Dick Telford | 1 | 0 | 1966 |
| 1966 | Brian McKenzie | 81 | 0 | 1966–1972 |
| 1966 | Con Britt | 110 | 72 | 1966–1973 |
| 1966 | Ian Bremner | 1 | 0 | 1966 |
| 1967 | Shane Whelan | 20 | 22 | 1967–1969 |
| 1967 | Terry Alexander | 28 | 11 | 1967–1969 |
| 1967 | Jack Green | 18 | 2 | 1967–1969 |
| 1967 | Barry Leslie | 1 | 0 | 1967 |
| 1967 | Ross Dunne | 213 | 238 | 1967–1978 |
| 1968 | Dennis Le Gassick | 8 | 0 | 1968–1969 |
| 1968 | Danny Hibbert | 20 | 12 | 1968–1970 |
| 1968 | Denis O'Callaghan | 129 | 3 | 1968–1973, 1975 |
| 1968 | John Greening | 107 | 70 | 1968–1972, 1974–1976 |
| 1968 | Ron Moylan | 12 | 9 | 1968–1969 |
| 1968 | Bernie Brady | 1 | 0 | 1968 |
| 1968 | David Wheadon | 19 | 4 | 1968–1970 |
| 1968 | Bruce Neave | 13 | 0 | 1968–1970 |
| 1968 | Barry Mugeli | 3 | 0 | 1968 |
| 1968 | Paul Walker | 3 | 0 | 1968–1969 |
| 1969 | John Bell | 2 | 0 | 1969 |
| 1969 | Gordon Lawrie | 2 | 0 | 1969–1970 |
| 1969 | Jeff Pitts | 4 | 1 | 1969 |
| 1969 | Max Richardson | 211 | 158 | 1969–1978 |
| 1969 | Jeff Clifton | 102 | 0 | 1969–1974 |
| 1969 | Mark Slater | 2 | 0 | 1969–1970 |
| 1969 | Doug Gott | 97 | 26 | 1969–1977 |
| 1969 | Ronnie Wearmouth | 186 | 127 | 1969–1981 |
| 1969 | Robert Dean | 121 | 37 | 1969–1975 |
| 1970 | Bob Heard | 106 | 110 | 1970–1975 |
| 1970 | Graeme Shephard | 46 | 18 | 1970, 1974–1975 |
| 1970 | Peter Pettigrew | 19 | 5 | 1970–1972 |
| 1970 | Robert Stevens | 9 | 0 | 1970–1971 |
| 1970 | Peter Eakins | 32 | 1 | 1970–1972 |
| 1970 | Robert Rose | 26 | 14 | 1970–1972 |
| 1970 | Alan Atkinson | 134 | 49 | 1970–1978 |
| 1970 | Bruce Outtram | 1 | 0 | 1970 |
| 1970 | Gary Tredrea | 19 | 6 | 1970–1972 |
| 1971 | Henry Coles | 44 | 48 | 1971–1975 |
| 1971 | Mike Delahunty | 42 | 4 | 1971–1975 |
| 1971 | John Parkinson | 3 | 1 | 1971 |
| 1971 | Denis O'Brien | 1 | 0 | 1971 |
| 1971 | Daryl Salmon | 56 | 0 | 1971–1974 |
| 1971 | John Vickery | 4 | 0 | 1971–1972 |
| 1971 | Laurie Kaine | 6 | 0 | 1971–1973 |
| 1971 | Paul Stevens | 18 | 3 | 1971–1972 |
| 1972 | Rod Oborne | 87 | 85 | 1972–1976, 1978–1979 |
| 1972 | John Walker | 1 | 0 | 1972 |
| 1972 | Ian McOrist | 12 | 16 | 1972 |
| 1972 | Wes McGaw | 4 | 2 | 1972 |
| 1972 | Ian Cooper | 93 | 0 | 1972, 1974–1977, 1979, 1981–1982 |
| 1972 | Graeme Dunstan | 31 | 39 | 1972–1974 |
| 1973 | George Bisset | 41 | 49 | 1973–1974 |
| 1973 | Paul Cranage | 48 | 0 | 1973–1975 |
| 1973 | Colin Morse | 4 | 0 | 1973–1974 |
| 1973 | Graeme Reichman | 11 | 4 | 1973 |
| 1973 | Phil Manassa | 122 | 60 | 1973–1979 |
| 1973 | Kerry Foley | 11 | 0 | 1973, 1975–1977 |
| 1973 | Robert Hyde | 62 | 2 | 1973–1977 |
| 1973 | Danny O'Sullivan | 7 | 0 | 1973 |
| 1973 | Allan Holmes | 28 | 4 | 1973–1976 |
| 1973 | Michael Browne | 12 | 6 | 1973–1975 |
| 1973 | Stephen Clifford | 38 | 13 | 1973–1978 |
| 1973 | Greg Beck | 8 | 5 | 1973, 1975 |
| 1973 | Rene Kink | 154 | 240 | 1973–1983 |
| 1974 | Ray Shaw | 146 | 200 | 1974–1981 |
| 1974 | John Williams | 35 | 8 | 1974–1976 |
| 1974 | Billy Picken | 212 | 46 | 1974–1983, 1986 |
| 1974 | Shane Bond | 39 | 29 | 1974, 1976–1978 |
| 1974 | Wayne Gordon | 67 | 23 | 1974–1978 |
| 1974 | Peter Moore | 172 | 193 | 1974–1982 |
| 1975 | Phil Carman | 66 | 142 | 1975–1978 |
| 1975 | Andrew Ireland | 110 | 29 | 1975–1980 |
| 1975 | John Dellamarta | 17 | 3 | 1975–1978 |
| 1975 | Kevin Grose | 32 | 10 | 1975–1977 |
| 1975 | Graeme Anderson | 71 | 91 | 1975–1977, 1979–1980 |
| 1975 | Murrie Batt | 12 | 14 | 1975–1978 |
| 1975 | Terry Cahill | 1 | 0 | 1975 |
| 1975 | John Wise | 23 | 8 | 1975–1977 |
| 1975 | Wes Barrot | 1 | 0 | 1975 |
| 1975 | Ray Saltmarsh | 1 | 1 | 1975 |
| 1975 | Bruce Gonsalves | 5 | 8 | 1975–1976 |
| 1976 | Peter McCormack | 160 | 21 | 1976–1985 |
| 1976 | Jim Board | 7 | 5 | 1976 |
| 1976 | Chris Perry | 27 | 2 | 1976–1978, 1980 |
| 1976 | Terry Wight | 39 | 6 | 1976–1979 |
| 1976 | Lachie McDonald | 1 | 0 | 1976 |
| 1976 | Lex Pritchard | 3 | 1 | 1976–1977 |
| 1976 | Col Kimmorley | 4 | 1 | 1976 |
| 1976 | Graeme Moyle | 6 | 0 | 1976–1977 |
| 1976 | Russell Jessop | 5 | 0 | 1976–1977 |
| 1977 | Gerald Betts | 27 | 5 | 1977–1979 |
| 1977 | Kevin Worthington | 95 | 19 | 1977–1979, 1981–1982 |
| 1977 | Ricky Barham | 151 | 140 | 1977–1986 |
| 1977 | Stan Magro | 96 | 19 | 1977–1982 |
| 1977 | Sam Kekovich | 4 | 4 | 1977 |
| 1977 | Peter Marshall | 4 | 1 | 1977 |
| 1977 | Brian Cole | 2 | 0 | 1977–1978 |
| 1978 | Craig Stewart | 115 | 121 | 1978–1983 |
| 1978 | Laurie Sandilands | 4 | 6 | 1978 |
| 1978 | Kevin Morris | 71 | 53 | 1978–1981 |
| 1978 | Terry Phillipe | 5 | 1 | 1978 |
| 1978 | Ted Carroll | 3 | 2 | 1978 |
| 1978 | Derek Shaw | 47 | 32 | 1978–1979, 1981–1984 |
| 1978 | Ray Byrne | 121 | 10 | 1978–1983 |
| 1978 | Leigh Carlson | 42 | 32 | 1978–1981 |
| 1978 | Tony Shaw | 313 | 157 | 1978–1994 |
| 1978 | Greg Whitcroft | 4 | 2 | 1978 |
| 1979 | Geoff Austen | 13 | 3 | 1979, 1981 |
| 1979 | Craig Davis | 102 | 251 | 1979–1983 |
| 1979 | Stephen Roach | 4 | 0 | 1979–1980 |
| 1979 | Bill Valli | 17 | 17 | 1979 |
| 1979 | Michael Woolnough | 24 | 8 | 1979–1980 |
| 1979 | Russell Ohlsen | 50 | 22 | 1979–1981 |
| 1979 | Peter Daicos | 250 | 549 | 1979–1993 |
| 1979 | Denis Banks | 166 | 111 | 1979–1991 |
| 1979 | Mark Hannebery | 61 | 23 | 1979–1983 |
| 1979 | Ross Brewer | 47 | 85 | 1979–1981 |
| 1979 | Allan Edwards | 35 | 45 | 1979–1980, 1982–1983 |
| 1979 | David Twomey | 63 | 14 | 1979–1985 |
| 1979 | Mick Warren | 3 | 0 | 1979–1980 |
| 1979 | Mark Dreher | 15 | 0 | 1979–1982 |
| 1979 | David Young | 18 | 12 | 1979–1981 |
| 1980 | Allan Davis | 3 | 1 | 1980 |
| 1980 | Michael Horsburgh | 4 | 1 | 1980 |
| 1980 | Russell Johnston | 8 | 2 | 1980 |
| 1980 | David Brine | 3 | 0 | 1980 |
| 1980 | Grant Wilmot | 5 | 5 | 1980 |
| 1980 | Jon Hummel | 3 | 4 | 1980 |
| 1980 | Ian Low | 11 | 14 | 1980 |
| 1980 | Terry Domburg | 13 | 2 | 1980, 1982 |
| 1980 | Andrew Smith | 35 | 8 | 1980–1984 |
| 1980 | Des Herbert | 8 | 5 | 1980–1981 |
| 1980 | Stuart Atkin | 18 | 2 | 1980–1983 |
| 1981 | Graeme Allan | 54 | 29 | 1981–1984, 1986 |
| 1981 | Michael Taylor | 92 | 28 | 1981–1984 |
| 1981 | Mark Williams | 135 | 178 | 1981–1986 |
| 1981 | Mark Weideman | 28 | 34 | 1981–1984 |
| 1981 | Barry Evans | 2 | 3 | 1981 |
| 1981 | John Annear | 43 | 28 | 1981–1983 |
| 1981 | Warwick Irwin | 16 | 16 | 1981 |
| 1981 | Wes Fellowes | 102 | 28 | 1981–1989 |
| 1981 | Murray Browne | 47 | 6 | 1981–1985 |
| 1981 | Noel Lovell | 16 | 6 | 1981–1984 |
| 1982 | Neil Peart | 13 | 0 | 1982 |
| 1982 | Graham Teasdale | 14 | 21 | 1982–1983 |
| 1982 | Wally Lovett | 15 | 11 | 1982 |
| 1982 | Geoff Miles | 31 | 7 | 1982–1984 |
| 1982 | Chris Dalkin | 18 | 12 | 1982–1983, 1985 |
| 1982 | Tony Beers | 5 | 1 | 1982–1983 |
| 1982 | Peter Carter | 1 | 1 | 1982 |
| 1982 | Gordon Towan | 2 | 0 | 1982 |
| 1982 | Paul Ryan | 6 | 1 | 1982 |
| 1982 | Tom Floyd | 14 | 8 | 1982–1983 |
| 1982 | Tony Keenan | 3 | 0 | 1982, 1984 |
| 1982 | Mark Lawson | 11 | 0 | 1982–1984 |
| 1982 | Tony Russell | 8 | 17 | 1982–1984 |
| 1983 | David Cloke | 114 | 51 | 1983–1989 |
| 1983 | Mike Richardson | 60 | 117 | 1983–1986 |
| 1983 | Gary Shaw | 32 | 33 | 1983–1984, 1986 |
| 1983 | Phil Walsh | 22 | 9 | 1983 |
| 1983 | Greg Phillips | 84 | 12 | 1983–1986 |
| 1983 | Greg Fyffe | 1 | 2 | 1983 |
| 1983 | Shane Morwood | 195 | 111 | 1983–1993 |
| 1983 | Geoff Raines | 47 | 24 | 1983–1986 |
| 1983 | Carl Herbert | 3 | 0 | 1983 |
| 1983 | Brett Cooper | 1 | 0 | 1983 |
| 1983 | Tony Kelly | 10 | 3 | 1983–1985 |
| 1984 | Bruce Abernethy | 58 | 16 | 1984–1986 |
| 1984 | Mark Beers | 40 | 23 | 1984–1987 |
| 1984 | Jim McAllester | 10 | 18 | 1984 |
| 1984 | Dale Woodhall | 12 | 32 | 1984 |
| 1984 | Darren McLaine | 2 | 1 | 1984 |
| 1984 | Ron Andrews | 6 | 8 | 1984 |
| 1984 | Neville Shaw | 43 | 28 | 1984–1986 |
| 1984 | Scott Knight | 5 | 2 | 1984 |
| 1984 | Jamie Turner | 160 | 33 | 1984–1993 |
| 1984 | Allen Eade | 8 | 1 | 1984–1985 |
| 1984 | Ron McKeown | 123 | 105 | 1984–1993 |
| 1984 | Glenn McLean | 2 | 0 | 1984 |
| 1984 | Michael Erwin | 3 | 0 | 1984–1985 |
| 1984 | Darren Millane | 147 | 78 | 1984–1991 |
| 1984 | Ian McMullin | 25 | 29 | 1984–1987, 1992–1993 |
| 1985 | Tony Burgess | 21 | 2 | 1985–1986 |
| 1985 | Russell Dickson | 20 | 18 | 1985–1987 |
| 1985 | James Manson | 120 | 106 | 1985–1992 |
| 1985 | Greg Smith | 31 | 7 | 1985–1986 |
| 1985 | Brian Taylor | 97 | 371 | 1985–1990 |
| 1985 | Gordon Sumner | 26 | 3 | 1985–1986 |
| 1985 | Darren Collins | 21 | 28 | 1985–1986 |
| 1985 | Cameron Doyle | 6 | 6 | 1985, 1987 |
| 1985 | Andrew Witts | 7 | 0 | 1985 |
| 1985 | Matthew Ryan | 45 | 44 | 1985–1989 |
| 1985 | Cameron O'Brien | 1 | 0 | 1985 |
| 1986 | Greg Daniels | 5 | 5 | 1986 |
| 1986 | Michael Gayfer | 142 | 1 | 1986–1993 |
| 1986 | Brett Gloury | 4 | 0 | 1986–1987 |
| 1986 | Shane Kerrison | 141 | 15 | 1986–1995 |
| 1986 | Dannie Seow | 18 | 8 | 1986–1987 |
| 1986 | Peter Bradbury | 23 | 6 | 1986–1987 |
| 1986 | Darren Handley | 12 | 10 | 1986 |
| 1986 | Michael Lockman | 15 | 3 | 1986–1987 |
| 1986 | Sandy Hyslop | 1 | 0 | 1986 |
| 1986 | Michael Edmonds | 2 | 1 | 1986 |
| 1986 | Geoff Pritchard | 1 | 0 | 1986 |
| 1986 | Paul Rizonico | 17 | 7 | 1986–1988 |
| 1986 | Peter Adams | 6 | 9 | 1986–1987 |
| 1987 | Neil Brindley | 1 | 0 | 1987 |
| 1987 | Gavin Brown | 254 | 195 | 1987–2000 |
| 1987 | Michael Christian | 131 | 23 | 1987–1995 |
| 1987 | Gavin Crosisca | 246 | 64 | 1987–2000 |
| 1987 | Grantley Fielke | 16 | 15 | 1987 |
| 1987 | Glenn Howard | 14 | 4 | 1987 |
| 1987 | Athas Hrysoulakis | 19 | 15 | 1987, 1989–1990 |
| 1987 | Paul Morwood | 15 | 2 | 1987 |
| 1987 | Craig Starcevich | 124 | 162 | 1987–1993 |
| 1987 | Jason Croall | 37 | 4 | 1987–1992 |
| 1987 | Graeme Atkins | 21 | 14 | 1987–1989 |
| 1987 | Terry Keays | 20 | 11 | 1987–1990 |
| 1987 | Alan Richardson | 114 | 10 | 1987–1988, 1990–1996 |
| 1987 | Tim Harrington | 8 | 0 | 1987 |
| 1987 | Brett Yorgey | 11 | 7 | 1987 |
| 1987 | Mark Orval | 7 | 7 | 1987–1988 |
| 1987 | Mark Perkins | 8 | 12 | 1987, 1989 |
| 1987 | Mick McGuane | 152 | 128 | 1987–1996 |
| 1987 | John Mrakov | 3 | 0 | 1987, 1989 |
| 1987 | Greg Faull | 1 | 0 | 1987 |
| 1987 | Paul Tuddenham | 40 | 32 | 1987–1991 |
| 1988 | Doug Barwick | 71 | 90 | 1988–1991 |
| 1988 | Paul Hawke | 41 | 30 | 1988–1989 |
| 1988 | David Robertson | 17 | 9 | 1988–1989 |
| 1988 | Graham Wright | 201 | 107 | 1988–1998 |
| 1988 | Damian Monkhorst | 205 | 45 | 1988–1999 |
| 1988 | Darren Saunders | 44 | 2 | 1988–1993 |
| 1988 | Tony Elshaug | 6 | 4 | 1988 |
| 1988 | Andrew Tarpey | 9 | 1 | 1988–1991 |
| 1989 | Colin Alexander | 24 | 28 | 1989–1991 |
| 1989 | Heath Shephard | 11 | 16 | 1989–1990 |
| 1989 | Craig Kelly | 122 | 43 | 1989–1996 |
| 1989 | Murray Wrensted | 10 | 4 | 1989 |
| 1989 | Mark Bayliss | 4 | 6 | 1989 |
| 1989 | Brendan Tranter | 8 | 0 | 1989–1990, 1992 |
| 1989 | Simon Taylor | 2 | 1 | 1989 |
| 1989 | Terry Hecker | 6 | 1 | 1989, 1992 |
| 1990 | Tony Francis | 142 | 103 | 1990–1998 |
| 1990 | Scott Russell | 182 | 107 | 1990–1998 |
| 1991 | Paul Williams | 189 | 223 | 1991–2000 |
| 1991 | Stephen Anderson | 4 | 2 | 1991 |
| 1991 | Mark Richardson | 141 | 83 | 1991–2002 |
| 1991 | Jason McCartney | 38 | 28 | 1991–1994 |
| 1991 | Kym Russell | 3 | 1 | 1991 |
| 1991 | Troy Lehmann | 31 | 24 | 1991–1993 |
| 1992 | Gary Pert | 70 | 4 | 1992–1995 |
| 1992 | Shane Watson | 141 | 102 | 1992–2000 |
| 1992 | Tony Woods | 18 | 6 | 1992–1994 |
| 1992 | Brad Rowe | 51 | 64 | 1992–1995 |
| 1992 | Mark Fraser | 45 | 23 | 1992–1994 |
| 1992 | Sav Rocca | 156 | 514 | 1992–2000 |
| 1992 | Brad Hardie | 2 | 2 | 1992 |
| 1993 | Barry Mitchell | 13 | 8 | 1993 |
| 1993 | Glenn Sandford | 5 | 1 | 1993–1994 |
| 1993 | Kent Butcher | 22 | 3 | 1993–1995 |
| 1993 | Andrew Tranquilli | 12 | 20 | 1993–1995 |
| 1994 | Jon Ballantyne | 9 | 0 | 1994–1995 |
| 1994 | Nathan Buckley | 260 | 263 | 1994–2007 |
| 1994 | Jon Hassall | 50 | 12 | 1994–1996 |
| 1994 | Brett James | 42 | 26 | 1994–1996 |
| 1994 | Stephen Ryan | 8 | 4 | 1994 |
| 1994 | Bradley Plain | 9 | 6 | 1994 |
| 1994 | Todd Curley | 3 | 1 | 1994 |
| 1994 | Brenton Sanderson | 4 | 1 | 1994 |
| 1994 | Damian Houlihan | 11 | 6 | 1994 |
| 1994 | Aaron James | 23 | 6 | 1994–1995, 1997 |
| 1994 | Justin Staritski | 1 | 0 | 1994 |
| 1994 | Paul Sharkey | 26 | 4 | 1994–1997 |
| 1994 | Trent Hotton | 17 | 14 | 1994–1996 |
| 1995 | Scott Burns | 265 | 149 | 1995–2008 |
| 1995 | Nick Hider | 2 | 1 | 1995 |
| 1995 | Chad Liddell | 29 | 15 | 1995–1998 |
| 1995 | Stephen Patterson | 96 | 88 | 1995–2000 |
| 1995 | Lee Walker | 16 | 13 | 1995–1997 |
| 1995 | Dermott Brereton | 15 | 30 | 1995 |
| 1995 | Chris Curran | 34 | 14 | 1995–1998 |
| 1995 | Mark Orchard | 45 | 10 | 1995–1996, 1999–2000 |
| 1995 | Jason Wild | 70 | 22 | 1995–1999 |
| 1995 | Robert Ahmat | 25 | 22 | 1995–1997 |
| 1995 | Andrew Schauble | 79 | 11 | 1995–1999 |
| 1996 | Scott Crow | 62 | 35 | 1996–1999 |
| 1996 | Alex McDonald | 61 | 20 | 1996–1999 |
| 1996 | Steven Pitt | 13 | 14 | 1996 |
| 1996 | Matthew Francis | 36 | 10 | 1996–1998 |
| 1996 | Robert Pyman | 5 | 1 | 1996 |
| 1996 | Simon Prestigiacomo | 233 | 3 | 1996–2010 |
| 1996 | Ben Wilson | 2 | 0 | 1996 |
| 1996 | Jason Bevan | 2 | 0 | 1996 |
| 1997 | John Barnett | 8 | 4 | 1997 |
| 1997 | Richard Osborne | 29 | 26 | 1997–1998 |
| 1997 | Anthony Rocca | 220 | 404 | 1997–2009 |
| 1997 | Jason Taylor | 4 | 0 | 1997 |
| 1997 | Mal Michael | 61 | 23 | 1997–2000 |
| 1997 | Josh Mahoney | 19 | 8 | 1997–1998 |
| 1997 | Brad Fuller | 19 | 12 | 1997–1999 |
| 1997 | Luke Godden | 36 | 0 | 1997–1999 |
| 1997 | Brad Cassidy | 2 | 0 | 1997 |
| 1997 | Dwayne Griffin | 1 | 0 | 1997 |
| 1998 | Shannon Gibson | 3 | 0 | 1998 |
| 1998 | Frank Raso | 19 | 1 | 1998–1999 |
| 1998 | Jamie Tape | 16 | 1 | 1998–1999 |
| 1998 | Chris Tarrant | 196 | 307 | 1998–2006, 2011–2012 |
| 1998 | Andrew Pugsley | 5 | 2 | 1998 |
| 1998 | Ben Kinnear | 50 | 11 | 1998–2004 |
| 1998 | Stuart Mangin | 3 | 2 | 1998 |
| 1998 | James Wasley | 23 | 3 | 1998–2000 |
| 1998 | Clinton King | 22 | 9 | 1998–1999 |
| 1998 | Brent Tuckey | 19 | 8 | 1998–2001 |
| 1998 | Michael Gardiner | 7 | 1 | 1998–1999 |
| 1999 | Nick Davis | 71 | 85 | 1999–2002 |
| 1999 | Glenn Freeborn | 83 | 42 | 1999–2003 |
| 1999 | Tyson Lane | 42 | 30 | 1999–2001 |
| 1999 | Paul Licuria | 182 | 70 | 1999–2007 |
| 1999 | Rick Olarenshaw | 5 | 0 | 1999 |
| 1999 | Cameron Venables | 3 | 0 | 1999 |
| 1999 | Rupert Betheras | 85 | 35 | 1999–2003 |
| 1999 | Heath Scotland | 53 | 12 | 1999–2003 |
| 1999 | Craig Jacotine | 16 | 6 | 1999–2000 |
| 1999 | Brad Oborne | 5 | 4 | 1999–2000 |
| 1999 | Tarkyn Lockyer | 227 | 149 | 1999–2010 |
| 2000 | Damien Adkins | 22 | 8 | 2000–2002 |
| 2000 | Leon Davis | 225 | 270 | 2000–2011 |
| 2000 | Josh Fraser | 200 | 156 | 2000–2010 |
| 2000 | Ben Johnson | 235 | 70 | 2000–2013 |
| 2000 | Shane O'Bree | 227 | 84 | 2000–2010 |
| 2000 | Andrew Ukovic | 17 | 9 | 2000–2001 |
| 2000 | Steven McKee | 64 | 13 | 2000–2004 |
| 2000 | Dale Baynes | 1 | 0 | 2000 |
| 2000 | Brad Smith | 1 | 0 | 2000 |
| 2000 | Andrew Dimattina | 28 | 6 | 2000–2002 |
| 2000 | Rhyce Shaw | 94 | 20 | 2000–2001, 2003–2008 |
| 2001 | Ryan Lonie | 123 | 61 | 2001–2008 |
| 2001 | Jarrod Molloy | 49 | 42 | 2001–2003 |
| 2001 | Chad Rintoul | 14 | 5 | 2001–2002 |
| 2001 | Carl Steinfort | 27 | 7 | 2001–2002 |
| 2001 | Shane Wakelin | 158 | 1 | 2001–2008 |
| 2001 | Brodie Holland | 119 | 104 | 2001–2008 |
| 2001 | James Clement | 146 | 13 | 2001–2007 |
| 2001 | Danny Roach | 1 | 0 | 2001 |
| 2001 | Alan Didak | 218 | 274 | 2001–2013 |
| 2001 | Andrew Hill | 1 | 0 | 2001 |
| 2002 | Richie Cole | 56 | 6 | 2002–2005 |
| 2002 | Scott Cummings | 5 | 6 | 2002 |
| 2002 | Jason Cloke | 76 | 10 | 2002–2006 |
| 2002 | Mark McGough | 37 | 12 | 2002–2004 |
| 2003 | Matthew Lokan | 46 | 20 | 2003–2005 |
| 2003 | Tristen Walker | 28 | 8 | 2003–2005 |
| 2003 | Andrew Williams | 32 | 22 | 2003–2005 |
| 2003 | Shane Woewodin | 62 | 31 | 2003–2005 |
| 2003 | Dane Swan | 258 | 211 | 2003–2016 |
| 2004 | Tom Davidson | 1 | 0 | 2004 |
| 2004 | Bo Nixon | 3 | 0 | 2004 |
| 2004 | Guy Richards | 39 | 3 | 2004–2007 |
| 2004 | David King | 9 | 8 | 2004 |
| 2004 | Luke Mullins | 3 | 0 | 2004 |
| 2004 | Cameron Cloke | 21 | 11 | 2004–2006 |
| 2004 | Nick Maxwell | 208 | 29 | 2004–2014 |
| 2004 | Julian Rowe | 26 | 8 | 2004–2006 |
| 2004 | Luke Shackleton | 1 | 0 | 2004 |
| 2004 | Justin Crow | 1 | 0 | 2004 |
| 2005 | Blake Caracella | 27 | 34 | 2005–2006 |
| 2005 | David Fanning | 14 | 4 | 2005–2006 |
| 2005 | Chad Morrison | 21 | 1 | 2005–2006 |
| 2005 | Travis Cloke | 246 | 441 | 2005–2016 |
| 2005 | Adam Iacobucci | 4 | 0 | 2005–2006 |
| 2005 | Ben Davies | 12 | 1 | 2005–2006 |
| 2005 | Chris Egan | 27 | 22 | 2005–2008 |
| 2005 | Sean Rusling | 17 | 19 | 2005–2008 |
| 2005 | Brent Hall | 1 | 0 | 2005 |
| 2005 | Heath Shaw | 173 | 37 | 2005–2013 |
| 2005 | Héritier Lumumba | 199 | 28 | 2005–2014 |
| 2006 | Dale Thomas | 157 | 121 | 2006–2013 |
| 2006 | Scott Pendlebury | 442 | 209 | 2006–2026 |
| 2006 | Sam Iles | 7 | 0 | 2006–2007 |
| 2007 | Paul Medhurst | 69 | 108 | 2007–2010 |
| 2007 | Daniel Nicholls | 1 | 0 | 2007 |
| 2007 | Shannon Cox | 25 | 6 | 2007–2009 |
| 2007 | Brad Dick | 27 | 32 | 2007, 2009–2011 |
| 2007 | Alan Toovey | 159 | 9 | 2007–2016 |
| 2007 | Chris Bryan | 30 | 10 | 2007–2009 |
| 2007 | Tyson Goldsack | 165 | 50 | 2007–2019 |
| 2007 | Danny Stanley | 5 | 0 | 2007–2009 |
| 2007 | Martin Clarke | 73 | 19 | 2007–2009, 2011–2014 |
| 2007 | Ben Reid | 152 | 73 | 2007–2020 |
| 2007 | Ryan Cook | 14 | 1 | 2007–2009 |
| 2008 | Nathan Brown | 130 | 7 | 2008–2016 |
| 2008 | Cameron Wood | 48 | 21 | 2008–2012 |
| 2008 | Jack Anthony | 43 | 80 | 2008–2010 |
| 2008 | Sharrod Wellingham | 92 | 55 | 2008–2012 |
| 2008 | Chris Dawes | 71 | 83 | 2008–2012 |
| 2008 | John McCarthy | 18 | 10 | 2008–2011 |
| 2009 | Dayne Beams | 119 | 123 | 2009–2014, 2019–2020 |
| 2009 | Leigh Brown | 65 | 54 | 2009–2011 |
| 2009 | Jaxson Barham | 7 | 1 | 2009–2010 |
| 2009 | Brent Macaffer | 77 | 33 | 2009–2016 |
| 2009 | Anthony Corrie | 3 | 2 | 2009 |
| 2009 | Steele Sidebottom | 375 | 213 | 2009–2026 |
| 2010 | Luke Ball | 81 | 33 | 2010–2014 |
| 2010 | Darren Jolly | 71 | 52 | 2010–2013 |
| 2010 | Jarryd Blair | 157 | 121 | 2010–2018 |
| 2011 | Simon Buckley | 26 | 7 | 2011–2012 |
| 2011 | Andrew Krakouer | 35 | 50 | 2011–2013 |
| 2011 | Alex Fasolo | 101 | 133 | 2011–2018 |
| 2011 | Luke Rounds | 6 | 1 | 2011 |
| 2011 | Lachlan Keeffe | 40 | 7 | 2011–2014, 2017 |
| 2011 | Ben Sinclair | 63 | 22 | 2011–2017 |
| 2011 | Tom Young | 9 | 2 | 2011–2012 |
| 2012 | Jackson Paine | 6 | 8 | 2012–2013 |
| 2012 | Paul Seedsman | 49 | 17 | 2012–2015 |
| 2012 | Peter Yagmoor | 2 | 0 | 2012–2014 |
| 2012 | Kirk Ugle | 3 | 0 | 2012 |
| 2012 | Jamie Elliott^ | 230 | 364 | 2012– |
| 2012 | Marley Williams | 68 | 6 | 2012–2016 |
| 2012 | Caolan Mooney | 6 | 2 | 2012–2014 |
| 2013 | Sam Dwyer | 39 | 22 | 2013–2015 |
| 2013 | Jack Frost | 54 | 0 | 2013–2016 |
| 2013 | Quinten Lynch | 18 | 9 | 2013–2014 |
| 2013 | Jordan Russell | 9 | 0 | 2013 |
| 2013 | Josh Thomas | 123 | 101 | 2013–2014, 2017–2021 |
| 2013 | Ben Hudson | 7 | 1 | 2013–2014 |
| 2013 | Ben Kennedy | 25 | 15 | 2013–2015 |
| 2013 | Jarrod Witts | 40 | 18 | 2013–2016 |
| 2013 | Kyle Martin | 6 | 7 | 2013–2014 |
| 2013 | Adam Oxley | 34 | 10 | 2013–2018 |
| 2013 | Clinton Young | 21 | 9 | 2013–2015 |
| 2013 | Brodie Grundy | 177 | 60 | 2013–2022 |
| 2014 | Taylor Adams | 175 | 64 | 2014–2023 |
| 2014 | Tom Langdon | 89 | 3 | 2014–2020 |
| 2014 | Jesse White | 56 | 75 | 2014–2017 |
| 2014 | Tim Broomhead | 37 | 27 | 2014–2020 |
| 2014 | Tony Armstrong | 6 | 0 | 2014–2015 |
| 2014 | Jackson Ramsay | 17 | 0 | 2013–2017 |
| 2014 | Corey Gault | 6 | 4 | 2012–2016 |
| 2015 | Jack Crisp^ | 280 | 92 | 2015– |
| 2015 | Jordan De Goey^ | 204 | 231 | 2015– |
| 2015 | Travis Varcoe | 92 | 41 | 2015–2020 |
| 2015 | Patrick Karnezis | 4 | 2 | 2014–2015 |
| 2015 | Brayden Maynard^ | 246 | 26 | 2015– |
| 2015 | Darcy Moore^ | 199 | 67 | 2015– |
| 2015 | Levi Greenwood | 86 | 31 | 2015–2021 |
| 2015 | Matthew Scharenberg | 41 | 0 | 2014–2020 |
| 2015 | Jonathon Marsh | 15 | 0 | 2014–2016 |
| 2016 | Adam Treloar | 94 | 49 | 2016–2020 |
| 2016 | James Aish | 50 | 15 | 2016–2019 |
| 2016 | Matthew Goodyear | 2 | 0 | 2015–2016 |
| 2016 | Jeremy Howe^ | 189 | 24 | 2016– |
| 2016 | Mason Cox | 139 | 127 | 2015–2025 |
| 2016 | Josh Smith | 32 | 6 | 2016–2018 |
| 2016 | Ben Crocker | 26 | 21 | 2016–2019 |
| 2016 | Tom Phillips | 89 | 44 | 2016–2020 |
| 2016 | Rupert Wills | 23 | 1 | 2016–2020 |
| 2017 | Will Hoskin-Elliott | 190 | 156 | 2017–2025 |
| 2017 | Chris Mayne | 76 | 11 | 2017–2021 |
| 2017 | Henry Schade | 8 | 1 | 2017 |
| 2017 | Daniel Wells | 15 | 16 | 2017–2019 |
| 2017 | Lynden Dunn | 33 | 2 | 2017–2020 |
| 2017 | Callum Brown | 70 | 23 | 2017–2022 |
| 2017 | Josh Daicos^ | 175 | 68 | 2017– |
| 2017 | Kayle Kirby | 1 | 0 | 2017–2018 |
| 2018 | Sam Murray | 13 | 0 | 2018–2019 |
| 2018 | Jaidyn Stephenson | 54 | 76 | 2018–2020 |
| 2018 | Flynn Appleby | 11 | 1 | 2018–2020 |
| 2018 | Brody Mihocek | 159 | 267 | 2018–2025 |
| 2018 | Brayden Sier | 27 | 6 | 2018–2021 |
| 2018 | Jack Madgen | 49 | 2 | 2018–2022 |
| 2018 | Nathan Murphy | 57 | 1 | 2018–2024 |
| 2019 | Jordan Roughead | 63 | 1 | 2019–2022 |
| 2019 | Isaac Quaynor^ | 154 | 5 | 2019– |
| 2019 | John Noble | 112 | 8 | 2019–2024 |
| 2020 | Tyler Brown | 27 | 4 | 2018–2022 |
| 2020 | Darcy Cameron^ | 142 | 72 | 2020– |
| 2020 | Atu Bosenavulagi | 3 | 0 | 2019–2020 |
| 2020 | Will Kelly | 5 | 1 | 2019–2023 |
| 2020 | Mark Keane | 5 | 0 | 2019–2021 |
| 2020 | Trey Ruscoe | 18 | 7 | 2020–2023 |
| 2020 | Max Lynch | 3 | 0 | 2017–2021 |
| 2021 | Oliver Henry | 25 | 28 | 2021–2022 |
| 2021 | Beau McCreery^ | 119 | 71 | 2021– |
| 2021 | Finlay Macrae | 21 | 5 | 2021–2025 |
| 2021 | Jay Rantall | 5 | 0 | 2020–2021 |
| 2021 | Caleb Poulter | 12 | 2 | 2021–2022 |
| 2021 | Tom Wilson | 8 | 2 | 2020–2023 |
| 2021 | Trent Bianco | 23 | 8 | 2020–2023 |
| 2021 | Jack Ginnivan | 42 | 58 | 2021–2023 |
| 2021 | Anton Tohill | 1 | 0 | 2019–2021 |
| 2022 | Nick Daicos^ | 118 | 89 | 2022– |
| 2022 | Patrick Lipinski^ | 105 | 52 | 2022– |
| 2022 | Nathan Kreuger | 13 | 11 | 2022–2024 |
| 2022 | Reef McInnes^ | 23 | 19 | 2022– |
| 2022 | Aiden Begg | 3 | 0 | 2021–2024 |
| 2022 | Isaac Chugg | 2 | 0 | 2021–2022 |
| 2022 | Josh Carmichael | 8 | 4 | 2022–2024 |
| 2022 | Ash Johnson | 27 | 36 | 2021–2025 |
| 2023 | Bobby Hill | 61 | 83 | 2023–2026 |
| 2023 | Daniel McStay^ | 61 | 94 | 2023– |
| 2023 | Tom Mitchell | 36 | 8 | 2023–2025 |
| 2023 | Billy Frampton^ | 74 | 8 | 2023– |
| 2023 | Oleg Markov | 43 | 3 | 2023–2025 |
| 2023 | Harvey Harrison^ | 28 | 18 | 2022– |
| 2023 | Jakob Ryan | 1 | 0 | 2023–2026 |
| 2024 | Charlie Dean | 12 | 0 | 2022–2025 |
| 2024 | Lachie Schultz^ | 58 | 61 | 2024– |
| 2024 | Lachie Sullivan | 26 | 10/ | 2024–2026 |
| 2024 | Joe Richards | 9 | 6 | 2023–2024 |
| 2024 | Jack Bytel | 7 | 1 | 2024 |
| 2024 | Ed Allan^ | 34 | 8 | 2024– |
| 2024 | Wil Parker | 14 | 1 | 2024–2026 |
| 2024 | Tew Jiath^ | 1 | 0 | 2024– |
| 2024 | Ned Long^ | 54 | 16 | 2024– |
| 2025 | Tim Membrey^ | 43 | 65 | 2025– |
| 2025 | Harry Perryman^ | 41 | 4 | 2025– |
| 2025 | Dan Houston^ | 45 | 13 | 2025– |
| 2025 | Will Hayes^ | 12 | 8 | 2025– |
| 2025 | Charlie West^ | 10 | 10 | 2025– |
| 2025 | Roan Steele^ | 24 | 15 | 2025– |
| 2026 | Jack Buller^ | 10 | 7 | 2026– |
| 2026 | Oscar Steene^ | 8 | 4 | 2026– |
| 2026 | Angus Anderson^ | 17 | 20 | 2026– |
| 2026 | Mitch Podhajski | 2 | 1 | 2026 |
| 2026 | Sam Swadling^ | 9 | 6 | 2026– |
| 2026 | Liam Puncher^ | 8 | 0 | 2026– |
| 2026 | Noah Howes | 2 | 0 | 2026 |

=== Listed players yet to debut ===
| Player | Recruited from | Draft details (Note: Details of joining the AFL.) | Senior list (Note: Years on Collingwood's list.) | Rookie list |
|---|---|---|---|---|
| Jesse Hogan | Greater Western Sydney | 2012 mini-draft, pick 2 | 2027– | —N/a |
| Zac McCarthy | Oakleigh Chargers | 2025 national draft, pick 55 | 2026– | —N/a |
| Lachie Neale | Brisbane Lions | 2011 national draft, pick 58 | 2027– | —N/a |
| Tyan Prindable | Coorparoo | 2025 national draft, pick 32 | 2026– | —N/a |
| Flynn Riley | Carlton | 2026 mid-season rookie draft, pick 4 | 2027– | —N/a |
| Finnbarr Roarty | Donegal (Ireland) | Cat B rookie | —N/a | 2027– |
| Jai Saxena | Oakleigh Chargers | Pre-listed cat A rookie | —N/a | 2026– |

== See also ==
- List of Collingwood Football Club women's players
- List of Collingwood Football Club coaches
