= Whitcroft =

Whitcroft is a surname. Notable people with the surname include:

- Fred Whitcroft (1882-1931), Canadian ice hockey player
- Greg Whitcroft (born 1960), Australian rules footballer
