= Kerry Foley =

Australian rules footballer

Personal information
- Full name: Kerry Foley
- Born: 13 November 1953 (age 72)
- Original team: Bundoora
- Height: 188 cm (6 ft 2 in)
- Weight: 85 kg (187 lb)
- Position: Defender

Playing career^{1}
Years	Club	Games (Goals)
1973–77	Collingwood	11 (0)
- ^{1} Playing statistics correct to the end of 1977.

Career highlights
- 1976 VFL Reserves Premiership 1978 VFA Premiership

Kerry Foley (born 13 November 1953) is a former Australian rules footballer who played with Collingwood in the Victorian Football League (VFL).

KERRY FOLEY From 1972 to 1977 played with VFL Club Collingwood, 11 Senior, 64 Reserves & 12 U 19 games, missing nearly 2 years injured, including 1976 Reserves winning Premiership From 1978 to 1983 Kerry played 101 games with VFA club Prahran. He played in the 1978 winning premiership team and represented the state on 3 occasions. Although not winning, for six years Kerry was top 5 in the best & fairest count . He was inducted as full back into the Prahran “Team of the Century “ in 2002
