= Graeme Moyle =

Australian rules footballer

Personal information
- Full name: Graeme Moyle
- Born: 1 July 1954 (age 72)
- Original team: Hamilton
- Height: 188 cm (6 ft 2 in)
- Weight: 84 kg (185 lb)

Playing career^{1}
| Years | Club | Games (Goals) |
| 1976–77 | Collingwood | 6 (0) |
- ^{1} Playing statistics correct to the end of 1977.

Graeme Moyle (born 1 July 1954) is a former Australian rules footballer who played with Collingwood in the Victorian Football League (VFL).
