= Gordon Lawrie =

Australian rules footballer

Personal information
- Full name: Gordon Lawrie
- Born: 3 December 1950 (age 75)
- Original team: East Reservoir

Playing career^{1}
Years	Club	Games (Goals)
1969–70	Collingwood	2 (0)
1971	Melbourne	6 (0)
Total		8 (0)
- ^{1} Playing statistics correct to the end of 1971.

Gordon Lawrie (born 3 December 1950) is a former Australian rules footballer who played with Collingwood and Melbourne in the Victorian Football League (VFL).
