= Ken Herbert =

Australian rules footballer

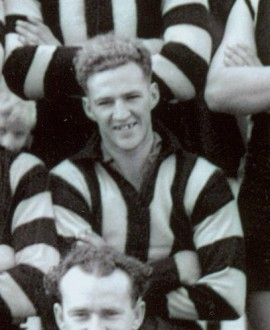
- Herbert during his Collingwood career

Personal information
- Full name: Kenneth Herbert
- Born: 27 December 1924; Collingwood, Victoria
- Died: 3 March 2011 (aged 86)
- Original team: Collingwood District
- Height: 173 cm (5 ft 8 in)
- Weight: 72.5 kg (160 lb)

Playing career^{1}
Years	Club	Games (Goals)
1942–45	Collingwood	20 (2)
1943	Sturt-South	5 (7)
- ^{1} Playing statistics correct to the end of 1945.

Kenneth Herbert (27 December 1924 – 3 March 2011) was an Australian rules footballer who played with Collingwood in the Victorian Football League (VFL).
