= Lachie McDonald =

Australian rules footballer

Personal information
- Full name: Lachlan Malcolm McDonald
- Born: 3 November 1956 (age 70)
- Original team: Coleraine
- Height: 188 cm (6 ft 2 in)
- Weight: 86.5 kg (191 lb)

Playing career^{1}
Years	Club	Games (Goals)
1976	Collingwood	1 (0)
- ^{1} Playing statistics correct to the end of 1976.

Lachlan Malcolm McDonald (born 3 November 1956) is a former Australian rules footballer who played with Collingwood in the Victorian Football League (VFL).
