= Ted Prendergast =

Australian rules footballer

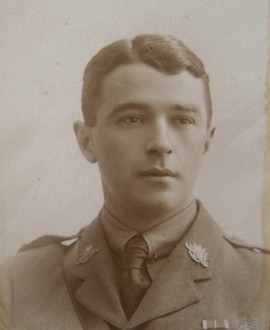

Personal information
- Full name: Edward Percy Prendergast
- Born: 20 August 1893; Newlyn, Victoria
- Died: 13 May 1967 (aged 73); Malvern, Victoria
- Original team: Flemington
- Height: 179 cm (5 ft 10 in)
- Weight: 70 kg (154 lb)

Playing career^{1}
Years	Club	Games (Goals)
1912	Collingwood	5 (4)
- ^{1} Playing statistics correct to the end of 1912.

Edward Percy Prendergast (20 August 1893 – 13 May 1967) was an Australian rules footballer who played with Collingwood in the Victorian Football League (VFL).
