= Bert McDonald =

Australian rules footballer

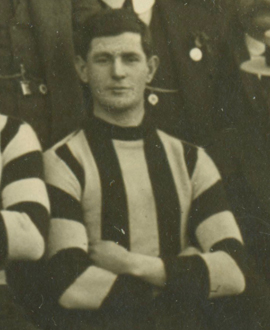
- McDonald in 1913

Personal information
- Full name: Albert Stanley Gordon McDonald
- Born: 12 March 1890; Fitzroy, Victoria
- Died: 14 June 1952 (aged 62); Beechworth, Victoria
- Original team: Brunswick Street Methodists
- Height: 169 cm (5 ft 7 in)
- Weight: 68 kg (150 lb)

Playing career^{1}
Years	Club	Games (Goals)
1913	Collingwood	3 (4)
- ^{1} Playing statistics correct to the end of 1913.

Albert Stanley Gordon McDonald (12 March 1890 – 14 June 1952) was an Australian rules footballer who played for the Collingwood Football Club in the Victorian Football League (VFL).
