= Sam MacKechnie =

Australian rules footballer

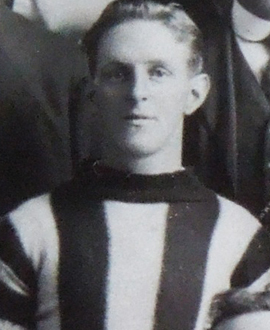

Personal information
- Full name: Sam MacKechnie
- Born: 5 June 1897
- Died: 23 November 1960 (aged 63)
- Original team: Fairfield
- Height: 175 cm (5 ft 9 in)
- Weight: 79 kg (174 lb)

Playing career^{1}
Years	Club	Games (Goals)
1917–18	Collingwood	14 (1)
- ^{1} Playing statistics correct to the end of 1918.

Sam MacKechnie (5 June 1897 – 23 November 1960) was a former Australian rules footballer who played with Collingwood in the Victorian Football League (VFL).
