= Lindsay Bristow =

Australian rules footballer

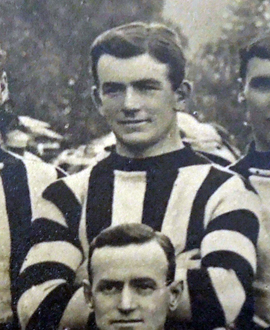
- Bristow in 1909

Personal information
- Full name: Lindsay Gordon Bristow
- Born: 30 March 1888; Allansford, Victoria
- Died: 4 September 1960 (aged 72); Heidelberg, Victoria
- Original team: Allansford
- Height: 171 cm (5 ft 7 in)
- Weight: 75 kg (165 lb)

Playing career^{1}
Years	Club	Games (Goals)
1909	Collingwood	2 (0)
- ^{1} Playing statistics correct to the end of 1909.

Lindsay Gordon Bristow (30 March 1888 – 4 September 1960) was an Australian rules footballer who played with Collingwood in the Victorian Football League (VFL).
