= Roy Gray =

Australian rules footballer

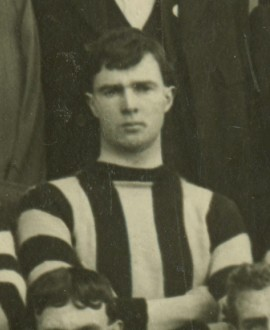
- Gray in 1912

Personal information
- Full name: Clarence Roy Gray
- Born: 31 October 1892; Collingwood, Victoria
- Died: 7 April 1933 (aged 40); Melbourne, Victoria
- Original team: Collingwood District

Playing career^{1}
Years	Club	Games (Goals)
1912–13	Collingwood	18 (20)
1914	Melbourne	1 (0)
Total		19 (20)
- ^{1} Playing statistics correct to the end of 1914.

Clarence Roy Gray (31 October 1892 – 7 April 1933) was an Australian rules footballer who played with Collingwood and Melbourne in the Victorian Football League (VFL).
