= Jim Tibballs =

Australian rules footballer

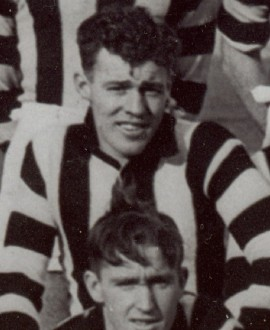
- Tibballs in 1944

Personal information
- Full name: Jim Tibballs
- Born: 23 September 1922
- Died: 13 December 1959 (aged 37)
- Original team: Wonthaggi East
- Height: 178 cm (5 ft 10 in)
- Weight: 80.5 kg (177 lb)

Playing career^{1}
Years	Club	Games (Goals)
1944	Collingwood	4 (1)
- ^{1} Playing statistics correct to the end of 1944.

Jim Tibballs (23 September 1922 – 13 December 1959) was an Australian rules footballer who played with Collingwood in the Victorian Football League (VFL).
