= Reg Meese =

Australian rules footballer

Personal information
- Full name: John Reginald Meese
- Born: 17 July 1927
- Died: 7 October 2005 (aged 78)
- Original team: Northcote / Thornbury CYMS (CYMSFA)
- Height: 183 cm (6 ft 0 in)
- Weight: 82.5 kg (182 lb)

Playing career^{1}
Years	Club	Games (Goals)
1948	Collingwood	1 (0)
1949	Preston (VFA)	14 (3)
- ^{1} Playing statistics correct to the end of 1948.

John Reginald Meese (17 July 1927 – 7 October 2005) was an Australian rules footballer who played with Collingwood in the Victorian Football League (VFL).
