= Bill Punch =

Australian rules footballer (1885–1948)

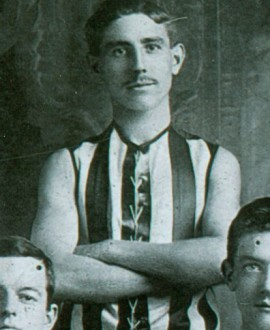
- Punch in 1906

Personal information
- Full name: William George Punch
- Born: 13 June 1885; Collingwood, Victoria
- Died: 7 January 1948 (aged 62); Sandringham, Victoria
- Original team: Fitzroy Juniors
- Height: 168 cm (5 ft 6 in)
- Weight: 65 kg (143 lb)

Playing career^{1}
Years	Club	Games (Goals)
1906	Collingwood	3 (0)
- ^{1} Playing statistics correct to the end of 1906.

William George Punch (13 June 1885 – 7 January 1948) was an Australian rules footballer who played with Collingwood in the Victorian Football League (VFL).
