= Jack Synon =

Australian rules footballer

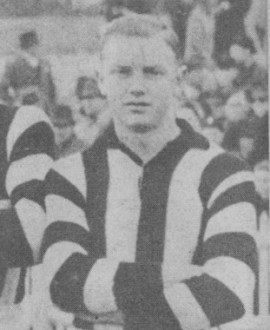

Personal information
- Full name: John Henry Francis Synon
- Born: 28 July 1924
- Died: 4 February 2015 (aged 90)
- Original team: Heidelberg Juniors / Northcote CYMS (CYMSFA)
- Height: 177 cm (5 ft 10 in)
- Weight: 72 kg (159 lb)

Playing career^{1}
Years	Club	Games (Goals)
1944	Collingwood	7 (0)
- ^{1} Playing statistics correct to the end of 1944.

John Henry Francis "Jack" Synon (28 July 1924 – 4 February 2015) was an Australian rules footballer who played for the Collingwood Football Club in the Victorian Football League (VFL).
