= Ned Harper =

Australian rules footballer

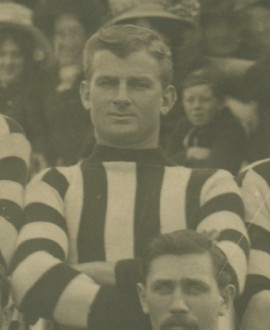
- Harper in 1910

Personal information
- Full name: Edward Harper
- Born: 10 December 1883; Inglewood, Victoria
- Died: 24 April 1939 (aged 55); Dandenong, Victoria
- Original team: Port Melbourne
- Height: 175 cm (5 ft 9 in)
- Weight: 68 kg (150 lb)

Playing career^{1}
| Years | Club | Games (Goals) |
| 1910 | Collingwood | 1 (0) |
- ^{1} Playing statistics correct to the end of 1910.

Edward Harper (10 December 1883 – 24 April 1939) was an Australian rules footballer who played with Collingwood in the Victorian Football League (VFL).
