= Wes McGaw =

Australian rules footballer

Personal information
- Full name: Wesley David McGaw
- Born: 6 June 1950
- Died: 5 September 1981 (aged 31)
- Original team: Regent
- Height: 185 cm (6 ft 1 in)
- Weight: 74.5 kg (164 lb)

Playing career^{1}
Years	Club	Games (Goals)
1972	Collingwood	4 (2)
- ^{1} Playing statistics correct to the end of 1972.

Wesley David 'Wes' McGaw (6 June 1950 – 5 September 1981) was an Australian rules footballer who played with Collingwood in the Victorian Football League (VFL) and Preston in the Victorian Football Association (VFA).
