= Keith Kent =

Australian rules footballer, born 1912

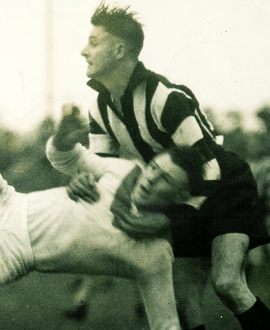
- Kent in 1933

Personal information
- Full name: Clarance Keith Kent
- Born: 6 November 1912
- Died: 29 September 1999 (aged 86)
- Original team: Abbotsford
- Height: 180 cm (5 ft 11 in)
- Weight: 73 kg (161 lb)

Playing career^{1}
Years	Club	Games (Goals)
1933	Collingwood	5 (0)
- ^{1} Playing statistics correct to the end of 1933.

Clarance Keith Kent (6 November 1912 – 29 September 1999) was a former Australian rules footballer who played with Collingwood in the Victorian Football League (VFL).
