= Tom Tucker (footballer) =

Australian rules footballer, born 1912

Personal information
- Full name: Tom Tucker
- Born: 3 October 1912
- Died: 21 December 1982 (aged 70)
- Original teams: Geelong Post & Telegraph
- Height: 179 cm (5 ft 10 in)
- Weight: 73 kg (161 lb)

Playing career^{1}
Years	Club	Games (Goals)
1932	Collingwood	2 (0)
- ^{1} Playing statistics correct to the end of 1932.

Tom Tucker (3 October 1912 – 21 December 1982) was a former Australian rules footballer who played with Collingwood in the Victorian Football League (VFL).
