= Neville Swan =

Australian rules footballer

Personal information
- Full name: Neville Swan
- Born: 23 January 1930
- Died: 3 May 2012 (aged 82)
- Original team: Bentliegh Juniors
- Height: 185 cm (6 ft 1 in)
- Weight: 85 kg (187 lb)

Playing career^{1}
Years	Club	Games (Goals)
1950–52	Collingwood	25 (0)
- ^{1} Playing statistics correct to the end of 1952.

Neville Swan (23 January 1930 – 3 May 2012) was an Australian rules footballer who played with Collingwood in the Victorian Football League (VFL).
