= Jack Benson =

Australian rules footballer, born 1901

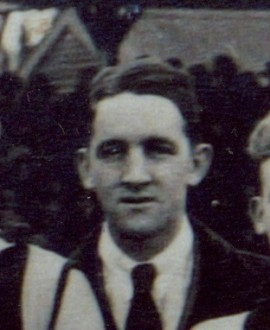

Personal information
- Full name: John Benson
- Born: 1 October 1901; Warrnambool, Victoria
- Died: 28 August 1971 (aged 69); Sydney, New South Wales
- Original team: Northcote
- Height: 179 cm (5 ft 10 in)
- Weight: 81 kg (179 lb)

Playing career^{1}
Years	Club	Games (Goals)
1923–24	Collingwood	10 (0)
- ^{1} Playing statistics correct to the end of 1924.

John Benson (1 October 1901 – 28 August 1971) was an Australian rules footballer who played with Collingwood in the Victorian Football League (VFL).

== Family ==
The son of William Benson (1865-1943), and Annie Benson (1866-1943), née Hanley, John Benson was born at Warrnambool, Victoria on 1 October 1901.

He married Athalie Florence Pizzey (1906-1995) on 26 August 1933.

== Education ==
He was educated at St James' Grammar School, which, at its 1920 move from St James' Anglican Church, in Upper Heidelberg Road, Ivanhoe, to its current location at The Ridgeway, also in Ivanhoe, was renamed Ivanhoe Grammar School.

He was not only the inaugural President of the Old Ivanhoe Grammarians' Association (OIGA) in 1920, but was also the longest-serving member of staff in the school's history. He retired in 1966, having served as a teacher for 47 years (1920-1966). The school's gymnasium is named after him.

He studied at the University of Melbourne, graduating with a Diploma in Commerce in April 1930.

== Football ==
In 1928 he was awarded a half-blue in football by the Melbourne University Sports Union.

== Death ==
He died at Sydney, New South Wales on 28 August 1971.
