= Paul Stevens (Australian footballer) =

Australian rules footballer

Personal information
- Full name: Paul Stevens
- Born: 23 July 1953 (age 73)
- Original team: Watsonia
- Height: 185 cm (6 ft 1 in)
- Weight: 74 kg (163 lb)

Playing career^{1}
Years	Club	Games (Goals)
1971–72	Collingwood	18 (3)
- ^{1} Playing statistics correct to the end of 1972.

Paul Stevens (born 23 July 1953) is a former Australian rules footballer who played with Collingwood in the Victorian Football League (VFL).
