= Bill Whitbourne =

Australian rules footballer, born 1902

Personal information
- Full name: Bill Whitbourne
- Born: 3 August 1902
- Died: 24 September 1970 (aged 68)
- Original team: Williamstown
- Height: 184 cm (6 ft 0 in)
- Weight: 82 kg (181 lb)

Playing career^{1}
Years	Club	Games (Goals)
1924	Collingwood	4 (1)
- ^{1} Playing statistics correct to the end of 1924.

Bill Whitbourne (3 August 1902 – 24 September 1970) was a former Australian rules footballer who played with Collingwood in the Victorian Football League (VFL).
