= Alan Hammond =

Australian rules footballer, born 1912

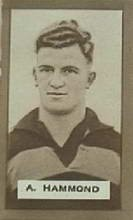

Personal information
- Full name: Alan Hammond
- Born: 19 March 1912
- Died: 13 May 1981 (aged 69)
- Original team: Stratford
- Height: 184 cm (6 ft 0 in)
- Weight: 82 kg (181 lb)

Playing career^{1}
Years	Club	Games (Goals)
1932–1933	Collingwood	6 (1)
- ^{1} Playing statistics correct to the end of 1933.

Alan Hammond (19 March 1912 – 13 May 1981) was an Australian rules footballer who played for the Collingwood Football Club in the Victorian Football League (VFL).
