= Ernie Rudduck =

Australian rules footballer

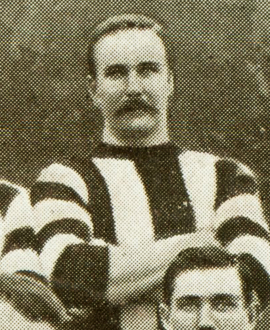
- Rudduck in 1907

Personal information
- Full name: Ernest Rudduck
- Born: 14 March 1884; Dromana, Victoria
- Died: 4 September 1972 (aged 88); Dromana, Victoria
- Original team: Richmond (VFA)
- Height: 175 cm (5 ft 9 in)
- Weight: 75 kg (165 lb)

Playing career^{1}
Years	Club	Games (Goals)
1907	Collingwood	14 (0)
- ^{1} Playing statistics correct to the end of 1907.

Ernie Rudduck (14 March 1884 – 4 September 1972) was an Australian rules footballer who played with Collingwood in the Victorian Football League (VFL).
