= Herbert Cheffers =

Australian rules footballer

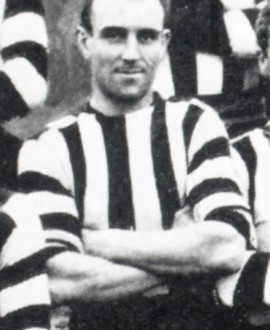
- Cheffers in 1907

Personal information
- Full name: Herbert Cheffers
- Born: 26 November 1883; Prospect, South Australia
- Died: 20 August 1973 (aged 89); Essendon West, Victoria
- Original team: Essendon (VFA)
- Height: 183 cm (6 ft 0 in)
- Weight: 83 kg (183 lb)

Playing career^{1}
Years	Club	Games (Goals)
1907	Collingwood	7 (5)
- ^{1} Playing statistics correct to the end of 1907.

Herbert Cheffers (26 November 1883 – 20 August 1973) was an Australian rules footballer who played with Collingwood in the Victorian Football League (VFL).
