= Harold Gyton =

Australian rules footballer

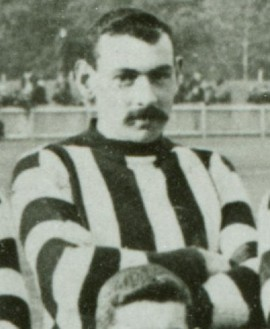
- Gyton in 1908

Personal information
- Full name: Harold Leopold Gyton
- Born: 21 March 1884; Richmond, Victoria
- Died: 23 August 1964 (aged 80); Heidelberg, Victoria
- Original team: Queenscliff Engineers
- Height: 180 cm (5 ft 11 in)
- Weight: 83 kg (183 lb)

Playing career^{1}
Years	Club	Games (Goals)
1908	Collingwood	9 (1)
- ^{1} Playing statistics correct to the end of 1908.

Harold Leopold Gyton (21 March 1884 – 23 August 1964) was an Australian rules footballer who played with Collingwood in the Victorian Football League (VFL).
