= Percy Wilmot =

Australian rules footballer (1881–1950)

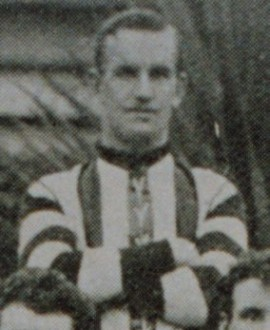
- Wilmot in 1903

Personal information
- Full name: George Percy Wilmot
- Born: 17 February 1881; Geelong, Victoria
- Died: 25 April 1950 (aged 69); Surrey Hills, Victoria
- Original team: Barwon
- Height: 174 cm (5 ft 9 in)
- Weight: 73 kg (161 lb)

Playing career^{1}
Years	Club	Games (Goals)
1903	Collingwood	1 (1)
- ^{1} Playing statistics correct to the end of 1903.

George Percy Wilmot (17 February 1881 – 25 April 1950) was an Australian rules footballer who played with Collingwood in the Victorian Football League (VFL).
