= Bill Unwin =

Australian rules footballer, born 1915

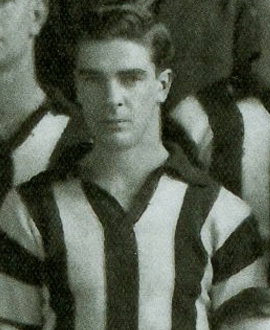
- Unwin in 1940

Personal information
- Full name: Bill Unwin
- Born: 25 November 1915
- Died: 16 June 1999 (aged 83)
- Original team: Fairfield CYMS (CYMSFA)
- Height: 188 cm (6 ft 2 in)
- Weight: 77 kg (170 lb)

Playing career^{1}
Years	Club	Games (Goals)
1938–41	Collingwood	23 (6)
- ^{1} Playing statistics correct to the end of 1941.

Bill Unwin (25 November 1915 – 16 June 1999) was an Australian rules footballer who played with Collingwood in the Victorian Football League (VFL).
