= Joe Toleman =

Australian rules footballer

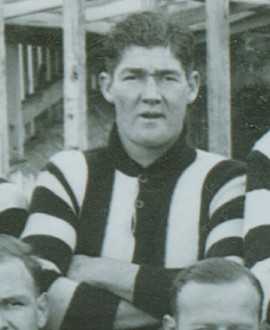
- Toleman in 1942

Personal information
- Full name: Joe Toleman
- Born: 26 September 1921
- Died: 15 May 2009 (aged 87)
- Original team: Hamilton / Ivanhoe
- Height: 182 cm (6 ft 0 in)
- Weight: 85.5 kg (188 lb)

Playing career^{1}
Years	Club	Games (Goals)
1942, 1944, 1946	Collingwood	9 (16)
- ^{1} Playing statistics correct to the end of 1946.

Joe Toleman (26 September 1921 – 15 May 2009) was an Australian rules footballer who played with Collingwood in the Victorian Football League (VFL).
