= Tommy Scanlon =

Australian rules footballer (1899–1951)

Thomas Scanlon

Personal information
- Full name: Thomas Scanlon
- Born: 16 August 1899; Romsey, Victoria
- Died: 29 August 1951 (aged 52); Fitzroy, Victoria
- Original team: Romsey
- Height: 175 cm (5 ft 9 in)
- Weight: 67 kg (148 lb)

Playing career^{1}
Years	Club	Games (Goals)
1921	Collingwood	5 (2)
- ^{1} Playing statistics correct to the end of 1921.

Thomas Scanlon (16 August 1899 – 29 August 1951) was an Australian rules footballer who played with Collingwood in the Victorian Football League (VFL).
