= Robert Stevens (Australian footballer) =

Australian rules footballer

Personal information
- Full name: Robert Stevens
- Born: 30 May 1951 (age 75)
- Original team: Montmorency
- Height: 193 cm (6 ft 4 in)
- Weight: 83 kg (183 lb)

Playing career^{1}
Years	Club	Games (Goals)
1970–71	Collingwood	9 (0)
- ^{1} Playing statistics correct to the end of 1971.

Robert Stevens (born 30 May 1951) is a former Australian rules footballer who played with Collingwood in the Victorian Football League (VFL).
