= Orm Pleasents =

Australian rules footballer

Personal information
- Full name: Ormond William Pleasents
- Born: 10 November 1882; Euroa
- Died: 30 September 1946 (aged 63); Margate, Kent
- Original team: Hawthorn (VMFL)
- Height: 179 cm (5 ft 10 in)
- Weight: 78 kg (172 lb)

Playing career^{1}
Years	Club	Games (Goals)
1907	Collingwood	1 (0)
- ^{1} Playing statistics correct to the end of 1907.

Ormond William Pleasents MC (10 November 1882 – 30 September 1946) was an Australian rules footballer who played with Collingwood in the Victorian Football League (VFL).

He had a distinguished military career in World War I, and was awarded the Military Cross for "conspicuous gallantry and devotion to duty near Angres, on 5th November 1918".

He died in Margate, Kent in 1946.
