= Bruce Outtram =

Australian rules footballer

Personal information
- Full name: Bruce William Outtram
- Born: 7 September 1949 (age 77)
- Original team: Casterton
- Height: 182 cm (6 ft 0 in)
- Weight: 80 kg (176 lb)

Playing career^{1}
Years	Club	Games (Goals)
1970	Collingwood	1 (0)
- ^{1} Playing statistics correct to the end of 1970.

Bruce William Outtram (born 7 September 1949) is a former Australian rules footballer who played with Collingwood in the Victorian Football League (VFL).
