= Jack Arnott (Australian footballer) =

Australian rules footballer

Personal information
- Full name: Albert John Arnott
- Born: 6 October 1920; Carlton, Victoria
- Died: 13 August 1999 (aged 78); Echuca, Victoria
- Original team: Richmond United
- Height: 183 cm (6 ft 0 in)
- Weight: 84 kg (185 lb)

Playing career^{1}
Years	Club	Games (Goals)
1942–1944	Collingwood	8 (14)
- ^{1} Playing statistics correct to the end of 1944.

Albert John Arnott (6 October 1920 – 13 August 1999) was an Australian rules footballer who played with Collingwood in the Victorian Football League (VFL).
