= Bert McKnight =

Australian rules footballer

Personal information
- Full name: Herbert Robert McKnight
- Born: 1 December 1883; Broomfield, Victoria
- Died: 1 May 1961 (aged 77); Westby, Victoria
- Original team: Macorna
- Height: 173 cm (5 ft 8 in)
- Weight: 68 kg (150 lb)

Playing career^{1}
| Years | Club | Games (Goals) |
| 1909 | Collingwood | 1 (0) |
- ^{1} Playing statistics correct to the end of 1909.

Herbert Robert McKnight (1 December 1883 – 1 May 1961) was an Australian rules footballer who played for the Collingwood Football Club in the Victorian Football League (VFL).
