= Allan Knorr =

Australian rules footballer

Personal information
- Full name: Allan Knorr
- Born: 23 September 1927
- Died: 28 October 2002 (aged 75)
- Original team: Ivanhoe
- Height: 185 cm (6 ft 1 in)
- Weight: 82 kg (181 lb)

Playing career^{1}
Years	Club	Games (Goals)
1946	Collingwood	9 (1)
- ^{1} Playing statistics correct to the end of 1946.

Allan Knorr (23 September 1927 – 28 October 2002) was an Australian rules footballer who played for the Collingwood Football Club in the Victorian Football League (VFL).
