= Noel McCamish =

Australian rules footballer

Personal information
- Full name: Noel McCamish
- Born: 7 May 1900
- Died: 26 April 1945 (aged 44)
- Original team: Perth
- Height: 182 cm (6 ft 0 in)
- Weight: 81 kg (179 lb)

Playing career^{1}
Years	Club	Games (Goals)
1923	Collingwood	2 (0)
- ^{1} Playing statistics correct to the end of 1923.

Noel McCamish (7 May 1900 – 26 April 1945) was an Australian rules footballer who played with Collingwood in the Victorian Football League (VFL).
