= Tony Heath =

Australian rules footballer

Personal information
- Full name: Tony Heath
- Born: 10 October 1937 (age 89)
- Original team: Preston Swimmers

Playing career^{1}
Years	Club	Games (Goals)
1957	Collingwood	2 (2)
- ^{1} Playing statistics correct to the end of 1957.

Tony Heath (born 10 October 1937) is a former Australian rules footballer who played with Collingwood in the Victorian Football League (VFL).
