= Les Oram =

Australian rules footballer

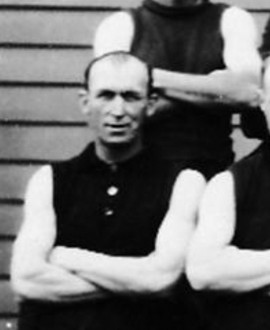
- Oram in 1930

Personal information
- Full name: Leslie Oram
- Born: 18 March 1893; Richmond, Victoria
- Died: 22 July 1966 (aged 73); Elmore, Victoria
- Original team: Essendon A
- Height: 5 ft 10 in 178 cm
- Weight: 71 kg (157 lb)
- Position: Ruck (Sorrento)

Playing career^{1}
Years	Club	Games (Goals)
1916	Collingwood	7 (4)
1926	Stawell	18 (unknown)
1927-29	Sorrento	39 (unknown)
1930	Nar Nar Goon	18 (10)
- ^{1} Playing statistics correct to the end of 1916.

Career highlights
- 1927-28 coach, 1930 Premiership

Leslie Oram (18 March 1893 – 22 July 1966) was an Australian rules footballer who played with Collingwood in the Victorian Football League (VFL). Les took up umpiring in 1931 in the Nar Nar Goon district.
