= Bill Carden (footballer) =

Australian rules footballer

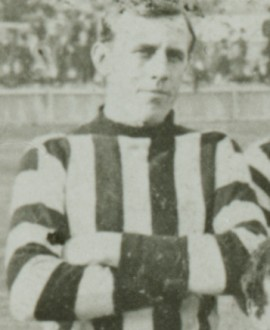
- Carden in 1908

Personal information
- Full name: William John Carden
- Born: 24 May 1886; Collingwood, Victoria
- Died: 24 August 1962 (aged 76); Fitzroy, Victoria
- Original team: Prahran
- Height: 177 cm (5 ft 10 in)
- Weight: 67 kg (148 lb)

Playing career^{1}
Years	Club	Games (Goals)
1908	Collingwood	5 (0)
- ^{1} Playing statistics correct to the end of 1908.

Bill Carden (24 May 1886 – 24 August 1962) was an Australian rules footballer who played with Collingwood in the Victorian Football League.
