= Bob Carmichael (footballer) =

Australian rules footballer

Personal information
- Full name: Robert Stephen Carmichael
- Born: 11 February 1882; Fitzroy, Victoria
- Died: 23 February 1954 (aged 72); Prospect, South Australia
- Original team: Fitzroy District
- Height: 169 cm (5 ft 7 in)
- Weight: 63 kg (139 lb)

Playing career^{1}
Years	Club	Games (Goals)
1900	Collingwood	1 (0)
- ^{1} Playing statistics correct to the end of 1900.

Bob Carmichael (11 February 1882 – 23 February 1954) was a former Australian rules footballer who played with Collingwood in the Victorian Football League (VFL).
