= Peter Hayes (footballer) =

Australian rules footballer

Personal information
- Full name: Peter Hayes
- Born: 22 December 1938 (age 87)
- Original team: Clifton Hill
- Height: 183 cm (6 ft 0 in)
- Weight: 81 kg (179 lb)

Playing career^{1}
Years	Club	Games (Goals)
1959–60	Collingwood	2 (0)
- ^{1} Playing statistics correct to the end of 1960.

Peter Hayes is a former Australian rules footballer who played with Collingwood in the Victorian Football League (VFL).
