= Eric Dalton (footballer) =

Australian rules footballer (1910–1976)

Personal information
- Full name: Eric Thorold Dalton
- Born: 26 December 1910; Wangaratta, Victoria
- Died: 11 January 1976 (aged 65)
- Original team: Milawa
- Height: 175 cm (5 ft 9 in)
- Weight: 76 kg (168 lb)

Playing career^{1}
Years	Club	Games (Goals)
1932	Collingwood	3 (2)
1934	Essendon	5 (6)
Total		8 (8)
- ^{1} Playing statistics correct to the end of 1934.

Eric Thorold Dalton (26 December 1910 – 11 January 1976) was a former Australian rules footballer who played with Collingwood and Essendon in the Victorian Football League (VFL).

Dalton later served in the Australian Army during World War II.
