= Harry Knell =

Australian rules footballer

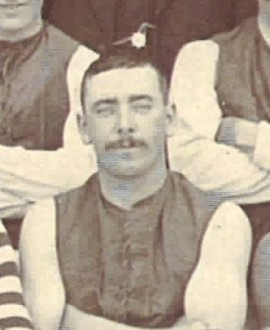
- Knell in 1901

Personal information
- Full name: Herbert Knell
- Born: 10 November 1880; St Andrews, Victoria
- Died: 24 June 1936 (aged 55); Prahran, Victoria
- Original team: Wellington
- Height: 183 cm (6 ft 0 in)
- Weight: 81 kg (179 lb)

Playing career^{1}
Years	Club	Games (Goals)
1901	Collingwood	1 (0)
- ^{1} Playing statistics correct to the end of 1901.

Herbert "Harry" Knell (10 November 1880 – 24 June 1936) was an Australian rules footballer who played with Collingwood in the Victorian Football League (VFL).
