= Bruce Neave =

Australian rules footballer

Personal information
- Full name: Bruce Neave
- Born: 2 July 1949 (age 77)
- Original team: Colac

Playing career^{1}
Years	Club	Games (Goals)
1968–70	Collingwood	13 (0)
- ^{1} Playing statistics correct to the end of 1970.

Bruce Neave (born 2 July 1949) is a former Australian rules footballer who played with Collingwood in the Victorian Football League (VFL).
