= Clive Reid =

Australian rules footballer

Personal information
- Full name: Clive Ernest Reid
- Born: 20 April 1922; South Melbourne, Victoria
- Died: 7 March 1972 (aged 49); Ballarat, Victoria
- Original team: Coburg / Navy
- Height: 180 cm (5 ft 11 in)
- Weight: 88 kg (194 lb)

Playing career^{1}
Years	Club	Games (Goals)
1943	Collingwood	2 (0)
- ^{1} Playing statistics correct to the end of 1943.

Clive Ernest Reid (20 April 1922 – 7 March 1972) was an Australian rules footballer who played with Collingwood in the Victorian Football League (VFL).

Reid served in the Royal Australian Navy during World War II.
