= Ray Saltmarsh =

Australian rules footballer

Personal information
- Full name: Ray Saltmarsh
- Born: 18 October 1952 (age 74)
- Original team: Preston
- Height: 185 cm (6 ft 1 in)
- Weight: 81 kg (179 lb)

Playing career^{1}
Years	Club	Games (Goals)
1975	Collingwood	1 (0)
- ^{1} Playing statistics correct to the end of 1975.

Ray Saltmarsh (born 18 October 1952) is a former Australian rules footballer who played with Collingwood in the Victorian Football League (VFL).
