= Fred Stancliffe =

Australian rules footballer

Personal information
- Full name: Frederick Ephraim Stancliffe
- Born: 21 October 1885; Collingwood, Victoria
- Died: 13 January 1975 (aged 89); Wynyard, Tasmania
- Original team: North Carlton Presbyterians
- Height: 185 cm (6 ft 1 in)
- Weight: 85 kg (187 lb)

Playing career^{1}
Years	Club	Games (Goals)
1905–07	Collingwood	12 (6)
- ^{1} Playing statistics correct to the end of 1907.

Frederick Ephraim Stancliffe (21 October 1885 – 13 January 1975) was an Australian rules footballer who played with Collingwood in the Victorian Football League (VFL).
