= Bill Heatley (footballer) =

Australian rules footballer

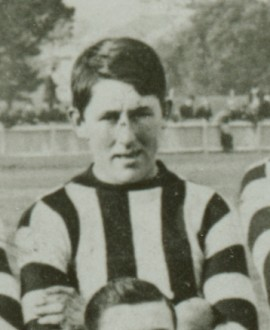
- Heatley in 1908

Personal information
- Full name: William Heatley
- Born: 13 March 1886; Carlton, Victoria
- Died: 31 August 1948 (aged 62); West Melbourne, Victoria
- Original team: Zeehan
- Height: 187 cm (6 ft 2 in)
- Weight: 92 kg (203 lb)

Playing career^{1}
Years	Club	Games (Goals)
1908–11	Collingwood	50 (19)
1912	Brighton (VFA)	5 (1)
- ^{1} Playing statistics correct to the end of 1912.

Bill Heatley (13 March 1886 – 31 August 1948) was an Australian rules footballer who played with Collingwood in the Victorian Football League (VFL).

== Family ==
Heatley was born William Kennedy, the son of the then unmarried Catherine Kennedy (1867–1899); and, when she married William Peter Heatley (1862–1936), in 1890, he took his step-father's surname of Heatley.

He married Eva Russell (1892–1967) in 1912.

== Football ==
=== Collingwood (VFL) ===
On 1 May 1908, he was granted a clearance from the Commonwealth Football Club, in Zeehan, Western Tasmania, to Collingwood. He played 50 games for Collingwood over four seasons.

Although he played in 16 matches, including the last three home-and-away matches, during the 1910 season, he did not play in any of the season's three Final matches.

=== Brighton (VFA) ===
Having played his final two senior matches for Collingwood (on 6 and 20 May 1911), he transferred to Brighton in the Victorian Football Association in late June 1911, but only played five games for them before his senior football career ended.

== Death ==
He died (suddenly) on 31 August 1948.
