= Barry Donegan (footballer) =

Australian rules footballer

Personal information
- Full name: Barry Donegan
- Born: 5 May 1938 (age 88)
- Original team: East Melbourne YCW
- Height: 178 cm (5 ft 10 in)
- Weight: 76 kg (168 lb)
- Position: Half-forward flank

Playing career^{1}
Years	Club	Games (Goals)
1958–1959	Collingwood	7 (1)
- ^{1} Playing statistics correct to the end of 1959.

Barry Donegan (born 5 May 1938) is a former Australian rules footballer who played for the Collingwood Football Club in the Victorian Football League (VFL).
