= Johnny Lyons (footballer) =

Australian rules footballer

Personal information
- Full name: John Joseph Lyons
- Born: 15 January 1876; Carlton, Victoria
- Died: 30 July 1910 (aged 34); Fitzroy, Victoria
- Original team: Collingwood Juniors
- Height: 178 cm (5 ft 10 in)
- Weight: 73 kg (161 lb)

Playing career^{1}
Years	Club	Games (Goals)
1899–1900	Collingwood	16 (12)
- ^{1} Playing statistics correct to the end of 1900.

John Joseph Lyons (15 January 1876 – 30 July 1910) was an Australian rules footballer who played with Collingwood in the Victorian Football League (VFL).
