= Bob Johnstone (Australian footballer) =

Australian rules footballer

Personal information
- Full name: Robert Johnstone
- Born: 19 March 1942
- Died: 3 June 2001 (aged 59)
- Original team: Minyip
- Height: 183 cm (6 ft 0 in)
- Weight: 79 kg (174 lb)

Playing career^{1}
Years	Club	Games (Goals)
1962–63	Collingwood	14 (11)
- ^{1} Playing statistics correct to the end of 1963.

Robert 'Bob' Johnstone (19 March 1942 – 3 June 2001) is a former Australian rules footballer who played with Collingwood in the Victorian Football League (VFL).
