= Tommy Cockram =

Australian rules footballer

Personal information
- Full name: Thomas Frederick Cockram
- Born: 26 February 1890; Brunswick, Victoria
- Died: 22 October 1952 (aged 62); Aspendale, Victoria
- Original team: Flemington
- Height: 178 cm (5 ft 10 in)
- Weight: 79 kg (174 lb)

Playing career^{1}
| Years | Club | Games (Goals) |
| 1912 | Collingwood | 7 (8) |
- ^{1} Playing statistics correct to the end of 1912.

Thomas Frederick Cockram (26 February 1890 – 22 October 1952) was an Australian rules footballer who played with Collingwood in the Victorian Football League (VFL).
