= Barry Leslie =

Australian rules footballer

Personal information
- Full name: Barry Leslie
- Born: 27 April 1946 (age 80)
- Original team: South Bendigo
- Height: 188 cm (6 ft 2 in)
- Weight: 82 kg (181 lb)

Playing career^{1}
Years	Club	Games (Goals)
1967	Collingwood	1 (0)
1968	North Melbourne	4 (1)
Total		5 (1)
- ^{1} Playing statistics correct to the end of 1968.

Barry Leslie is a former Australian rules footballer who played for the Collingwood Football Club and North Melbourne Football Club in the Victorian Football League (VFL).
