= Stan Moon =

Australian rules footballer

Personal information
- Full name: Stanley Charles Moon
- Born: 8 January 1927; Northcote, Victoria
- Died: 3 August 2012 (aged 85)
- Original team: Northcote
- Height: 185 cm (6 ft 1 in)
- Weight: 78 kg (172 lb)

Playing career^{1}
Years	Club	Games (Goals)
1947	Collingwood	7 (4)
- ^{1} Playing statistics correct to the end of 1947.

Stanley Charles Moon (8 January 1927 – 3 August 2012) was an Australian rules footballer who played with Collingwood in the Victorian Football League (VFL).

Moon earlier served in the Royal Australian Air Force during World War II, enlisting shortly after his eighteenth birthday.
