= Col Davey =

Australian rules footballer

Personal information
- Full name: Colin Pearce Davey
- Born: 29 June 1927
- Died: 20 July 2013 (aged 86)
- Original team: Subiaco
- Height: 191 cm (6 ft 3 in)
- Weight: 84 kg (185 lb)

Playing career^{1}
Years	Club	Games (Goals)
1951–52	Collingwood	30 (34)
- ^{1} Playing statistics correct to the end of 1952.

Colin Pearce Davey (29 June 1927 – 20 July 2013) was an Australian rules footballer who played with Collingwood in the Victorian Football League (VFL).
