= Charlie Mutch =

Australian rules footballer

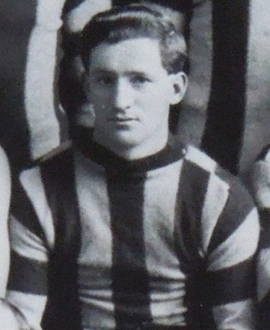
- Mutch in 1914

Personal information
- Full name: Charles Mutch
- Born: 31 August 1893; Collingwood, Victoria
- Died: 31 October 1974 (aged 81); South Australia
- Original team: Collingwood District
- Height: 180 cm (5 ft 11 in)
- Weight: 77 kg (170 lb)

Playing career^{1}
Years	Club	Games (Goals)
1914	Collingwood	3 (0)
- ^{1} Playing statistics correct to the end of 1914.

Charlie Mutch (31 August 1893 – 31 October 1974) was an Australian rules footballer who played with Collingwood in the Victorian Football League (VFL).
