= Ivan McIntosh =

Australian rules footballer, born 1913

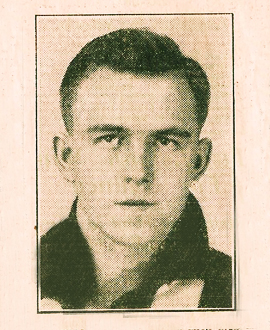
- McIntosh in 1933

Personal information
- Full name: Ivan McIntosh
- Born: 14 December 1913
- Died: 19 April 1970 (aged 56)
- Original team: East Brunswick
- Height: 178 cm (5 ft 10 in)
- Weight: 80 kg (176 lb)

Playing career^{1}
Years	Club	Games (Goals)
1933	Collingwood	6 (0)
- ^{1} Playing statistics correct to the end of 1933.

Ivan McIntosh (14 December 1913 – 19 April 1970) was a former Australian rules footballer who played with Collingwood in the Victorian Football League (VFL).
