= Barry Perry =

Australian rules footballer

Personal information
- Full name: Barry William Perry
- Born: 2 April 1939
- Died: 2 June 2013 (aged 74)
- Original team: University High School Old Boys
- Height: 180 cm (5 ft 11 in)
- Weight: 76 kg (168 lb)

Playing career^{1}
| Years | Club | Games (Goals) |
| 1961 | Collingwood | 2 (1) |
- ^{1} Playing statistics correct to the end of 1961.

Barry William Perry (2 April 1939 – 2 June 2013) was an Australian rules footballer who played for the Collingwood Football Club in the Victorian Football League (VFL).
