= Des Field =

Australian rules footballer

Personal information
- Full name: Des Field
- Born: 1 June 1942
- Original team: Coleraine
- Height: 180 cm (5 ft 11 in)
- Weight: 81 kg (179 lb)

Playing career^{1}
Years	Club	Games (Goals)
1960	Collingwood	2 (0)
- ^{1} Playing statistics correct to the end of 1960.

Des Field (born 1 June 1942) is a former Australian rules footballer who played with Collingwood in the Victorian Football League (VFL).
