= Bertie McDougall =

Australian rules footballer

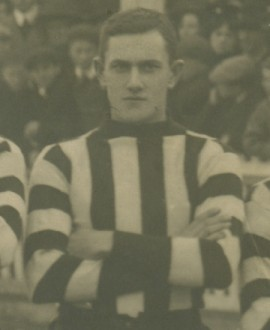
- McDougall in 1910

Personal information
- Full name: Bertram McDougall
- Born: 17 January 1890; Clifton Hill, Victoria
- Died: 10 January 1951 (aged 60); Paddington, New South Wales
- Original team: Collingwood District
- Height: 180 cm (5 ft 11 in)
- Weight: 78 kg (172 lb)

Playing career^{1}
Years	Club	Games (Goals)
1910	Collingwood	1 (0)
- ^{1} Playing statistics correct to the end of 1910.

Bertram McDougall (17 January 1890 – 10 January 1951) was an Australian rules footballer who played with Collingwood in the Victorian Football League (VFL).
