= Keith Osmond =

Australian rules footballer

Personal information
- Full name: Percy Ernest Keith Osmond
- Born: 26 January 1899; Sale, Victoria
- Died: 8 March 1969 (aged 70); Austin Hospital, Heidelberg, Victoria
- Original team: Richmond United F.C.
- Height: 165 cm (5 ft 5 in)
- Weight: 67 kg (148 lb)

Playing career^{1}
| Years | Club | Games (Goals) |
| 1921, 1923–24 | Richmond | 12 (0) |
| 1926 | Collingwood | 4 (0) |
| Total | | 16 (0) |
- ^{1} Playing statistics correct to the end of 1926.

Percy Ernest Keith Osmond (26 January 1899 – 8 March 1969) was an Australian rules footballer who played with Richmond and Collingwood in the Victorian Football League (VFL).

== Family ==
The son of Ernest John Osmond (1869-1951), and Catherine Osmond (1869-1938), née Goodie, Percy Ernest Keith Osmond was born at Sale, Victoria on 26 January 1899.

He married Isabella Small Walker (1894-1981) in 1938.

== Football ==
=== Richmond (VFL) ===
Recruited from the Richmond United Football Club in 1919. In his six seasons with the Richmond Football Club he played in 12 games with the First XVIII, and in 62 games with the Second XVIII (scoring 9 goals), including the 1923 Second XVIII Grand Final team that lost to Geelong 5.10 (40) to 9.12 (66), in which he was one of Richmond's best players.

=== Hamilton Y.M.C.A. ===
In 1925 he was appointed coach of the Hamilton Y.M.C.A. Football Club in the Hamilton and District Football Association.

=== Collingwod (VFL) ===
In May 1926 he was cleared to play with Collingwood.

== Death ==
He died at the Austin Hospital, in Heidelberg, Victoria on 8 March 1969.
