= Cyril Kent =

Australian rules footballer, born 1907

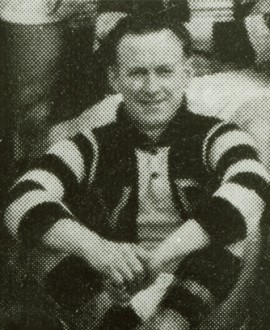
- Kent in 1928

Personal information
- Full name: Cyril Alan Kent
- Born: 28 August 1907; Fitzroy North, Victoria
- Died: 23 April 1968 (aged 60); Parkville, Victoria
- Original team: Brunswick
- Height: 177 cm (5 ft 10 in)
- Weight: 65 kg (143 lb)

Playing career^{1}
Years	Club	Games (Goals)
1928	Collingwood	1 (0)
- ^{1} Playing statistics correct to the end of 1928.

Cyril Alan Kent (28 August 1907 – 23 April 1968) was an Australian rules footballer who played with Collingwood in the Victorian Football League (VFL).
