= Andy Duff =

Australian rules footballer

Personal information
- Full name: Andrew George Duff
- Born: 22 May 1890; Collingwood, Victoria
- Died: 27 March 1981 (aged 90); Panton Hill, Victoria
- Original team: Abbotsford
- Height: 185 cm (6 ft 1 in)
- Weight: 79 kg (174 lb)

Playing career^{1}
Years	Club	Games (Goals)
1910	Collingwood	2 (0)
- ^{1} Playing statistics correct to the end of 1910.

Andrew George Duff (22 May 1890 – 27 March 1981) was an Australian rules footballer who played for the Collingwood Football Club in the Victorian Football League (VFL).
