= Terry Cahill (footballer, born 1955) =

Australian rules footballer

Personal information
- Full name: Terry Cahill
- Born: 25 October 1955 (age 71)
- Original team: Kingsbury
- Height: 182 cm (6 ft 0 in)
- Weight: 77 kg (170 lb)

Playing career^{1}
Years	Club	Games (Goals)
1975	Collingwood	1 (0)
- ^{1} Playing statistics correct to the end of 1975.

Terry Cahill (born 25 October 1955) is a former Australian rules footballer who played with Collingwood in the Victorian Football League (VFL).
