= Frank Corby =

Australian rules footballer

Personal information
- Full name: Eugene Francis Corby
- Born: 24 December 1924
- Died: 2008 (aged 83–84)
- Original team: Abbotsford
- Height: 174 cm (5 ft 9 in)
- Weight: 71 kg (157 lb)

Playing career^{1}
Years	Club	Games (Goals)
1948	Collingwood	6 (1)
- ^{1} Playing statistics correct to the end of 1948.

Eugene Francis Corby (24 December 1924 – c. 2008) was an Australian rules footballer who played with Collingwood in the Victorian Football League (VFL).
