= Dick Allen (footballer) =

Australian rules footballer (1921–1977)

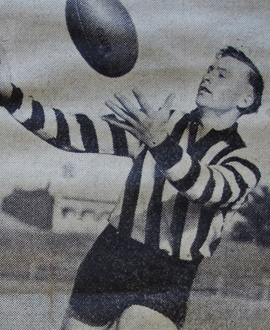
- Allen in 1943

Personal information
- Full name: Richard Ambrose Allen
- Born: 22 December 1921; Collingwood, Victoria
- Died: 14 August 1977 (aged 55); Sydenham, Victoria
- Original team: Northcote
- Height: 168 cm (5 ft 6 in)
- Weight: 62 kg (137 lb)

Playing career^{1}
Years	Club	Games (Goals)
1943	Collingwood	3 (2)
- ^{1} Playing statistics correct to the end of 1943.

Richard Ambrose Allen (22 December 1921 – 14 August 1977) was an Australian rules footballer who played with Collingwood in the Victorian Football League (VFL).

Allen enlisted in the Australian Army in April 1944 and had an eventful period of service. Not keen on Army discipline, Allen went AWOL and was disciplined for disobeying orders many times in his two years of service. While in New Guinea he suffered from appendicitis and dengue fever and then crashed an Army vehicle into the orderly room of the guard depot.
