= Fred Stabb =

Australian rules footballer

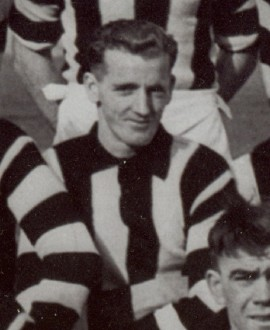
- Stabb in 1944

Personal information
- Full name: Frederick George Stabb
- Born: 14 February 1920
- Died: 1 October 2011 (aged 91)
- Original team: Northcote
- Height: 178 cm (5 ft 10 in)
- Weight: 68 kg (150 lb)

Playing career^{1}
| Years | Club | Games (Goals) |
| 1942–44 | Collingwood | 12 (0) |
- ^{1} Playing statistics correct to the end of 1944.

Fred Stabb (14 February 1920 – 1 October 2011) was an Australian rules footballer who played with Collingwood in the Victorian Football League (VFL).
