= Frank Wilcher =

Australian rules footballer

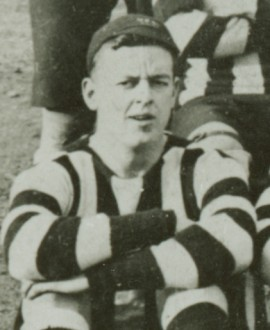
- Wilcher in 1908

Personal information
- Full name: Francis Walter Scott Wilcher
- Born: 10 August 1883; Williamstown, Victoria
- Died: 8 June 1960 (aged 76); Williamstown, Victoria
- Original team: South Fremantle
- Height: 178 cm (5 ft 10 in)
- Weight: 81 kg (179 lb)

Playing career^{1}
Years	Club	Games (Goals)
1906–09	Collingwood	53 (1)
- ^{1} Playing statistics correct to the end of 1909.

Francis Walter Scott Wilcher (10 August 1883 – 8 June 1960) was an Australian rules footballer who played with Collingwood in the Victorian Football League (VFL). Before playing with the Magpies he appeared for Williamstown in 1903–04 before transferring to South Fremantle for the 1905 season, from where he was recruited to Victoria Park. He became Mayor of Williamstown in 1927–28.
