= Paul Wadham =

Australian rules footballer, born 1943

Personal information
- Full name: Paul Vivian Wadham
- Born: 31 March 1943
- Died: 30 April 2006 (aged 63)
- Original team: Mortlake
- Height: 196 cm (6 ft 5 in)
- Weight: 98 kg (216 lb)

Playing career^{1}
Years	Club	Games (Goals)
1964–1965	Collingwood	21 (9)
- ^{1} Playing statistics correct to the end of 1965.

Paul Vivian Wadham (31 March 1943 – 30 April 2006) was an Australian rules footballer in the Victorian Football League.

Debuting with the Collingwood Football Club in 1964, Wadham was a key position forward for the Magpies, standing at 196 cm tall. He played 21 games, booting 9 goals in his two seasons at the club before leaving to be a playing coach for the Kyabram Football Club in 1966.

He was recruited from Mortlake.
