= Kevin Flint =

Australian rules footballer (1932–2010)

Personal information
- Full name: Kevin Flint
- Born: 9 November 1932
- Died: 19 May 2010 (aged 77)
- Original team: Yeomans
- Height: 180 cm (5 ft 11 in)
- Weight: 84.5 kg (186 lb)

Playing career^{1}
Years	Club	Games (Goals)
1952–53	Collingwood	4 (3)
- ^{1} Playing statistics correct to the end of 1953.

Kevin Flint (9 November 1932 – 19 May 2010) was an Australian rules footballer who played with Collingwood in the Victorian Football League (VFL).

Flint coached Osborne Football Club in the Central Riverina Football League in 1954.
