= Jack Sales =

Australian rules footballer

Personal information
- Full name: Jack Merton Sales
- Born: 30 March 1925; Brighton North, Victoria
- Died: 29 September 2007 (aged 82); Frankston, Victoria
- Original team: Hampton Rovers
- Height: 173 cm (5 ft 8 in)
- Weight: 72 kg (159 lb)

Playing career^{1}
Years	Club	Games (Goals)
1946–47	Sandringham (VFA)	40 (4)
1948–49	Collingwood	31 (2)
- ^{1} Playing statistics correct to the end of 1949.

Career highlights
- 1946 VFA Premiership

Jack Merton Sales (30 March 1925 – 29 September 2007) was an Australian rules footballer who played with Collingwood in the Victorian Football League (VFL).

== World War II ==
Sales enlisted in the Royal Australian Air Force three weeks after turning 18 and served until the end of World War II.

== Football ==
After demobilization, Sales joined Sandringham for the 1946 VFA season, and played on a wing in their premiership winning side that year. In 1947, Sales again appeared in a VFA Grand Final, this time on a losing side as Sandringham lost to Port Melbourne.

In 1948 Sandringham refused him a clearance to Collingwood, but he received a permit from the VFL and transferred to Collingwood. He played a total of 31 games over his two seasons with Collingwood before moving to a playing-coach role with Hamilton Imperials.

== Death ==
Sales died at Frankston on 29 September 2007 and was cremated at Bunurong Memorial Park.
