= Wally Tyrrell =

Australian rules footballer, born 1909

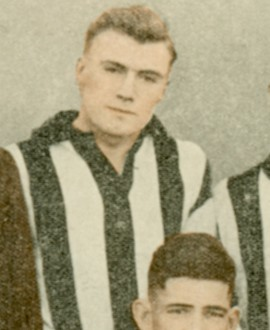
- Tyrrell in 1934

Personal information
- Full name: Walter Frederick Tyrrell
- Born: 6 December 1909; Fitzroy, Victoria
- Died: 30 August 1999 (aged 89); Bundoora, Victoria
- Original team: Clifton Hill CYMS (CYMSFA)
- Height: 178 cm (5 ft 10 in)
- Weight: 77 kg (170 lb)

Playing career^{1}
Years	Club	Games (Goals)
1934	Collingwood	1 (0)
- ^{1} Playing statistics correct to the end of 1934.

Walter Frederick Tyrrell (6 December 1909 – 30 August 1999) was an Australian rules footballer who played with Collingwood in the Victorian Football League (VFL).
