= Jeff Pitts =

Australian rules footballer

Personal information
- Full name: Jeff Pitts
- Born: 12 July 1950 (age 76)
- Original team: Belgrave

Playing career^{1}
Years	Club	Games (Goals)
1969	Collingwood	4 (1)
- ^{1} Playing statistics correct to the end of 1969.

Jeff Pitts (born 12 July 1950) is a former Australian rules footballer who played with Collingwood in the Victorian Football League (VFL).
