= George Blundell =

Australian rules footballer

Personal information
- Full name: Thomas George Blundell
- Born: 30 June 1879; Castlemaine, Victoria
- Died: 15 June 1907 (aged 27); Castlemaine, Victoria
- Original teams: Centrals, Castlemaine
- Height: 169 cm (5 ft 7 in)
- Weight: 67 kg (148 lb)

Playing career^{1}
Years	Club	Games (Goals)
1901	Collingwood	1 (1)
- ^{1} Playing statistics correct to the end of 1901.

Thomas George Blundell (30 June 1879 – 15 June 1907) was an Australian rules footballer who played with Collingwood in the Victorian Football League (VFL).

== Family ==
The son of a well-known Castlemaine blacksmith Thomas Blundell (1835-1905) and Sarah Ann Blundell, née Pitt (1846-1895), George Blundell was born in Castlemaine on 30 June 1879.

One of Blundell's older brothers was the captain of the local Foundry football team, and by the time George was in his late teens he was considered one of the leading athletes in the district: a magnificent footballer, talented cricketer, and a prominent racing cyclist.

== Football ==
Blundell began his footballing career with Castlemaine United. He debuted with another local team, Central, two years after that, and by 1900 had been made vice-captain. He was one of the best players for a combined Castlemaine team that took on a combined Bendigo team. In 1901 Blundell was named in a District team that played against Collingwood in Castlemaine early in August. The Mount Alexander Mail said Blundell was “easily the best” of the locals. “He did a power of work in the ruck, and had he had as good a man as the Collingwood ruck had to rove for him his usefulness would have been made much more conspicuous. While playing forward he also showed himself generally able to cope with his opponents.”

Three weeks later, Collingwood decided to give the then 21-year-old a trial in the last game of the 1901 VFL home-and-away season, naming him in a forward pocket against St Kilda.

The game was horribly lopsided but Blundell did not let his local supporters down on debut, kicking a goal and a behind and attracting generally favourable reviews after the Magpies’ victory. “Collingwood tried Blundell, of Castlemaine, on Saturday,” it was written in The Sportsman. “He has weight and ability, and is likely to be of great service to the Magpie team.”

== Death ==
In 1907 Blundell contracted a severe illness, which in the ensuing months turned into pneumonia, and George succumbed to it in June. He was just 27. Local newspaper reports noted that George Blundell had been one of the most popular young men of the town, and there was widespread grief at his premature demise.
