= Arthur Whitling =

Australian rules footballer

Personal information
- Full name: Arthur Whitling
- Born: 5 June 1892; Albury, New South Wales
- Died: 8 January 1967 (aged 74); Frankston, Victoria
- Original team: Fitzroy Imperials
- Height: 178 cm (5 ft 10 in)
- Weight: 67 kg (148 lb)

Playing career^{1}
Years	Club	Games (Goals)
1915	Collingwood	1 (0)
- ^{1} Playing statistics correct to the end of 1915.

Arthur Whitling (5 June 1892 – 8 January 1967) was an Australian rules footballer who played for the Collingwood Football Club in the Victorian Football League (VFL).
