= Greg Whitcroft =

Australian rules footballer

Personal information
- Full name: Greg Whitcroft
- Born: 6 April 1960 (age 66)
- Original team: Banyule
- Height: 183 cm (6 ft 0 in)
- Weight: 82 kg (181 lb)

Playing career^{1}
Years	Club	Games (Goals)
1978	Collingwood	4 (2)
- ^{1} Playing statistics correct to the end of 1978.

Greg Whitcroft (born 6 April 1960) is a former Australian rules footballer who played with Collingwood in the Victorian Football League (VFL).
