= Neil Brindley =

Australian rules footballer

Personal information
- Full name: Neil Brindley
- Born: 27 July 1967 (age 59)
- Original team: Greensborough
- Height: 182 cm (6 ft 0 in)
- Weight: 81 kg (179 lb)

Playing career^{1}
Years	Club	Games (Goals)
1987	Collingwood	1 (0)
- ^{1} Playing statistics correct to the end of 1987.

Neil Brindley (born 27 July 1967) is a former Australian rules footballer who played with Collingwood in the Victorian Football League (VFL).

Brindley played his first senior game in the opening round of the 1987 VFL season, in a 91-point loss to the Sydney Swans at Victoria Park. He was one of seven Collingwood players making their league debut that day, four of them future premiership players in Gavin Brown, Michael Christian, Gavin Crosisca and Craig Starcevich. Brindley however would never play again in the VFL.

He instead became one of the best Diamond Valley Football League midfielders of his time, winning three best and fairest awards for Greensborough in the early 1990s. In 1991 he was involved in the first ever three-way tie for the Frank Smith Medal. He shared the award with teammate Peter Mastin and Montmorency's Peter Woodward.

Brindley played at the Rye Football Club in the MPNFL for two seasons in 1997 and 1998. In his first year, he won the club's best and fairest award. Injury struck in his second year, with a ruptured ACL, in round three.

Greensbrough named him as a centreman in their official Team of the Century.
