= Grant Wilmot =

Australian rules footballer (1956–2016)

- Wilmot with Collingwood in 1980

Personal information
- Born: 15 October 1956
- Died: 4 July 2016 (aged 59)
- Original team: Montmorency
- Height: 182 cm (6 ft 0 in)
- Weight: 76 kg (168 lb)

Playing career^{1}
Years	Club	Games (Goals)
1977–1979	Preston	38
1980	Collingwood	5 (5)
- ^{1} Playing statistics correct to the end of 1980.

Career highlights
- Montmorency 1976 premiership player; Eltham 1989 premiership player; Eltham 1995 premiership coach; Montmorency Team of the Century

Grant Wilmot (15 October 1956 – 4 July 2016) was an Australian rules footballer who played with Collingwood in the Victorian Football League (VFL).

== Playing career ==
Wilmot played his junior football at Diamond Valley Football League club Montmorency and broke into their seniors in 1974. He was a member of Montmorency's 1976 premiership team.

From 1977 to 1979, Wilmot played for Preston in the Victorian Football Association (VFA). He played in the 1978 VFA Grand Final, which Preston lost to Prahran. Wilmot, who had previously fought a professional boxing bout as a middleweight in 1976, received a six-week suspension for his actions during the game.

He made five senior appearances for Collingwood in the 1980 VFL season. His best performance, which earned him three Brownlow Medal votes, came in a win over St Kilda at Victoria Park, where he had 20 disposals and kicked four goals.

Injuries brought an early end to his VFL career and he spent the rest of his playing career at Montmorency, Heidelberg West and Eltham. While at Heidelberg West in 1982, Wilmot finished second, to Wayne Headlam, in the Frank Smith Medal.

== Coaching ==
Wilmot started his coaching career in his one-season stint at Eltham, where he was both a player and assistant coach. Eltham defeated Epping in the Division 2 Grand Final that year. In 1990 and 1991 he was senior coach of Croydon, then head coach at Heidelberg for next two years. He coached Eltham to a premiership in 1995 and returned to Montmorency as an assistant coach the following year. In 1997 he was senior coach of Montmorency.
