= Mitch Lewis (footballer) =

Australian rules footballer (born 1998)

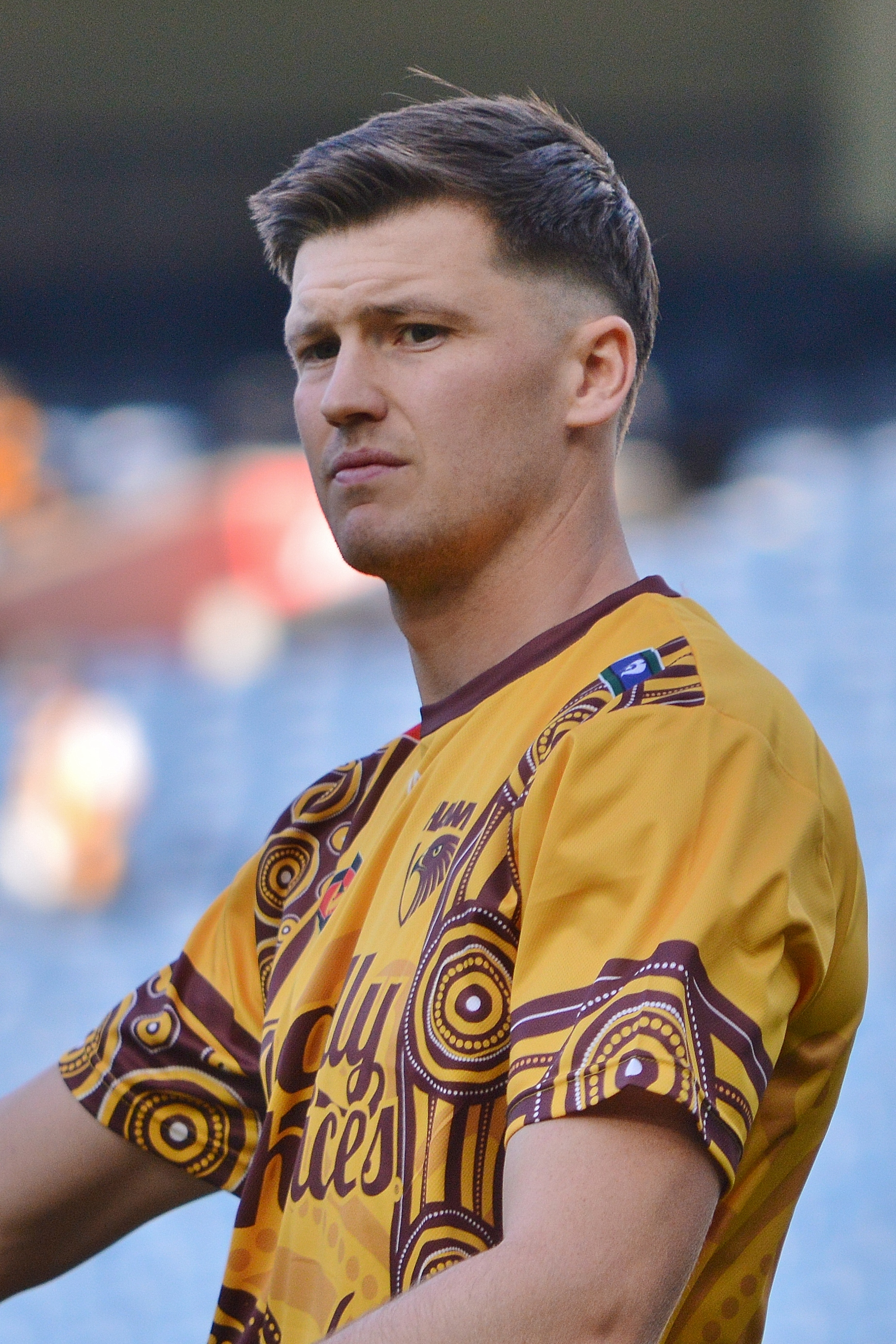
- Lewis in May 2026

Personal information
- Full name: Mitchell Lewis
- Born: 14 October 1998 (age 28); Wallan, Victoria
- Original team: Calder Cannons (TAC Cup) / Whittlesea (NJFNL)
- Draft: No. 76, 2016 national draft
- Debut: Round 9, 2018, Hawthorn vs. Brisbane, at the Gabba
- Height: 199 cm (6 ft 6 in)
- Weight: 101 kg (223 lb)
- Position: Key forward

Club information
- Current club: Hawthorn
- Number: 2

Playing career^{1}
Years	Club	Games (Goals)
2017–	Hawthorn	102 (172)
- ^{1} Playing statistics correct to the end of 2026.

Career highlights
- AFL Rising Star nominee: 2019; VFL premiership player: 2018; Box Hill leading goalkicker: 2018

Mitchell Lewis (born 14 October 1998) is a professional Australian rules footballer playing for the Hawthorn Football Club in the Australian Football League (AFL).

== Early career ==
Mitchell Lewis was born on 14 October 1998. He attended primary school at Wallan Primary School, in Wallan, Victoria, before later attending Assumption College, in Kilmore, graduating from the latter in 2016. He played junior football for the Whittlesea Football Club. A multi-sport athlete as a junior, Lewis had to choose between football, cricket, and golf. Lewis chose football and played for the Calder Cannons, despite playing district cricket and playing off a golfing handicap of 1.

== AFL career ==
Lewis was drafted by Hawthorn with their second selection and seventy-sixth overall in the 2016 AFL draft.

Lewis played 13 games for Box Hill in the Victorian Football League (VFL) in 2017 before he required a shoulder reconstruction. He continued to develop in 2018 averaging 3 goals a game for Box Hill. Lewis became a target up forward, kicking 38 goals in the VFL in the 2018 season and proved himself as a versatile big man as a marking forward or going into the ruck.

He got promoted for the round nine match against Brisbane at The Gabba.

In 2019 with the demise of Jarryd Roughead as the dominant forward, Lewis managed to string a few games together before returning to Box Hill with instruction to work on certain areas of his game. Five weeks later a more aggressive Lewis started to announce himself as a presence in the forward line and started to take contested marks and kick multiple goals on several occasions. He received an AFL Rising Star nomination later in the year. A shoulder injury ended his season prematurely.

Lewis changed his guernsey number to 2 ahead of the 2020 season. In round 2, 2022, Lewis kicked a career-best haul of 5 goals.

Lewis had a delayed start to the 2023 season after suffering a partially torn ACL during the pre-season.

In round 17 of the 2024 Season, in a game against the Geelong Cats, Lewis suffered another torn ACL. Lewis returned to playing in the middle of the 2025 season.

Lewis entered his free agency year in the 2026 season.

== Player profile ==
Lewis is a key forward who can pinch-hit as a back-up ruckman.

== Personal life ==
Lewis studied a Bachelor of Sport Development at Deakin University.

== Honours and achievements ==
=== Team ===
- McClelland Trophy (Hawthorn): 2024
- VFL premiership player (Box Hill): 2018

=== Individual ===
- Box Hill leading goalkicker: 2018
- AFL Rising Star nominee: 2019

== Statistics ==
Updated to the end of 2026.

Legend
G	Goals	K	Kicks	D	Disposals	T	Tackles
B	Behinds	H	Handballs	M	Marks

Season	Team	No.	Games	Totals							Averages (per game)							Votes
Season	Team	No.	Games	G	B	K	H	D	M	T	G	B	K	H	D	M	T	Votes
2018	Hawthorn	39	2	0	0	4	12	16	2	3	0.0	0.0	2.0	6.0	8.0	1.0	1.5	0
2019	Hawthorn	8	12	20	15	92	46	138	56	19	1.7	1.3	7.7	3.8	11.5	4.7	1.6	0
2020 (Note: The 2020 season was played with 17 home-and-away matches per team (down from 22) and 16-minute quarters with time on (down from 20-minute quarters with time on) due to the impact of the COVID-19 pandemic.)	Hawthorn	2	8	5	5	28	18	46	15	5	0.6	0.6	3.5	2.3	5.8	1.9	0.6	0
2021	Hawthorn	2	14	22	9	91	51	142	67	28	1.6	0.6	6.5	3.6	10.1	4.8	2.0	0
2022	Hawthorn	2	15	37	15	116	52	168	72	16	2.5	1.0	7.7	3.5	11.2	4.8	1.1	3
2023	Hawthorn	2	15	36	20	125	67	192	85	25	2.4	1.3	8.3	4.5	12.8	5.7	1.7	1
2024	Hawthorn	2	4	5	2	21	11	32	18	3	1.3	0.5	5.3	2.8	8.0	4.5	0.8	0
2025	Hawthorn	2	8	8	3	42	21	63	26	16	1.0	0.4	5.3	2.6	7.9	3.3	2.0	0
2026	Hawthorn	2	24	39	24	196	98	294	129	36	1.6	1.0	8.2	4.1	12.3	5.4	1.5	1
Career			102	172	93	715	376	1091	470	188	1.7	0.9	7.0	3.7	10.7	4.6	1.5	5
