= Ken Jones (Australian footballer) =

Australian rules footballer

Personal information
- Full name: Ken Jones
- Born: 26 April 1933 (age 93)
- Original team: Heidelberg
- Height: 175 cm (5 ft 9 in)
- Weight: 73 kg (161 lb)

Playing career^{1}
Years	Club	Games (Goals)
1957–1961	Fitzroy	55 (2)
- ^{1} Playing statistics correct to the end of 1961.

Ken Jones (born 26 April 1934) is a former Australian rules footballer who played with Fitzroy in the Victorian Football League (VFL).

Jones was recruited from Heidelberg, in the Diamond Valley Football League (DVFL). In both 1958 and 1960, he appeared in all 19 games, including a semi final.

A defender, he returned to the DVFL after leaving Fitzroy and twice won the league's best and fairest award. His first win was in 1962, at Montmorency. He was joint winner with Graham Campbell in 1966, this time playing for Diamond Creek.
