= Northern Football Netball League =

Australian rules football league

- Formerly: Diamond Valley Football League; Northern Football League
- Sport: Australian rules football, Netball
- Founded: 1922
- CEO: Martin Stillman
- Motto: Communities Working Together; Live it. Love it
- No. of teams: 31
- Country: Australia
- Most recent champion: Heidelberg
- Most titles: Heidelberg (24)
- Website: nfl.org.au

The Northern Football Netball League (NFNL), formerly known as the Diamond Valley Football League (DVFL) and later the Northern Football League (NFL), is an Australian rules football and netball competition based in the Diamond Valley region of suburban Melbourne, Victoria.

== History ==
The league was founded in 1922, originally having six clubs, three of whom still participate. In 1941 the league went into recess for five years as a result of World War II, the competition recommencing in 1946. After the war the league continued to grow.

=== Formation of Division Two ===
In 1981 the league was split into two divisions. The top 10 teams at the end of the 1980 season formed Division One (Diamond Creek, Greensborough, Heidelberg West, Lalor, Macleod-Rosanna, Montmorency, North Heidelberg, Reservoir-Lakeside, Templestowe and Watsonia) for the 1981 season. Division Two was formed by the 4 bottom placed teams from the 1980 season (Eltham, Epping, Heidelberg and South Morang) and 4 new teams making their debut (Bundoora, Northcote Park, Reservoir and West Preston) for the 1981 season.

=== Renaming of the League ===
The entire DVFL board resigned over the summer of 2006–2007 and was replaced by officials from AFL Victoria until suitable replacements were found before the start of the 2008 season. At the end of the 2017 season, the NFL was renamed the NFNL to incorporate Netball under the one banner- the NFNL.

=== Formation of Division Three ===
In 2008, the NFL added an open-age netball competition and announced an intention that a third division would be added for the 2009 season with the old 14 team second division to be split into eight and six team divisions, however Kinglake and Wallan both left the league so the NFL did not proceed. In 2009, the NFL stated that a permanent Division Three for 2010 would be dependent on at least one more club joining the league. With St Mary's indicating that they intended to field a senior team in 2010, the NFL announced a stand-alone Division Three to commence from 2010. Reversing an earlier decision, the NFL decided that Division Two would be split during the 2009 season based on ladder position after the 13th round once all teams had played each other once, with the top 8 teams remaining in Division Two and the bottom 6 teams forming Division Three for the remaining games of the season. It was also decided that the newly formed Division Three would play a finals series in 2009, but the premier would not gain promotion to Division Two as these teams had already been relegated for the 2009 season. At the end of Round 13, Diamond Creek, Epping, Fitzroy Stars, Lower Plenty, Macleod, Mernda, Watsonia and Whittlesea formed the top 8 teams and remained in Division Two, whilst Heidelberg West, Hurstbridge, Panton Hill, Parkside, Reservoir and South Morang were the bottom 6 teams and formed the new Division Three.

== League details ==
=== AFL Victoria Community Championships ===
In 2016, the Northern Football Netball League began playing in the AFL Victoria Community Championships for metropolitan and country competitions to challenge each other for the title of best football league in Victoria. In 2016, the league were defeated by the Mornington Peninsula Nepean Football League to be fifth. The next year the league defeated the Western Region Football League and were ranked fourth. In 2018, the league avenged its 2016 defeat by the MPNFL to be ranked second. In 2019, the Northern Football Netball League defeated the Geelong Football League to become the number one ranked league in Victoria.

=== Key people ===
- Chairman – Scott Walker
- CEO – Peter McDougall

=== Presidents ===
Name	Start	End
R.Rogers	1922	1922
A.Santon	1923	1928
S.W.Kirkland	1928	1941
F.Smith	1946	1947
R.R.Scott	1948	1953
G.J.Gilberg	1954	1954
W.Hart	1955	1979
R.G.Ward	1980	2006
B.Treager	2007	2007

=== Secretaries ===
Name	Start	End
W.S.Laurie	1922	1940
G.J.LeBrocq	1941	1975
B.A.Tooth	1976	1983
P.G.Floyd	1983	2006
D.Collings	2007	2007

== Senior competition ==
Locations of the 2027 NFNL clubs. Red pogs represent teams in Division One, orange pogs represent teams in Division Two, and yellow pogs represent teams in Division Three. Black pogs denote junior only clubs. Kilmore is based approximately 30 km north-west of Whittlesea, and Wallan is based 21km north-west of Whittlesea.

=== Clubs ===
==== Division 1 ====
Club	Jumper	Nickname	Home Ground	Former League	Est.	Years in NFNL	NFNL Senior Premierships	
Club	Jumper	Nickname	Home Ground	Former League	Est.	Years in NFNL	Total	Most recent
Banyule		Bears	R.J Brockwell Oval, Heidelberg	VAFA	1967	2015-	2	2022
Bundoora		Bulls	Yulong Reserve, Bundoora	PHFL	1974	1981-	6	2017
Diamond Creek		Demons	Coventry Oval, Diamond Creek	HDFL	1904	1922-1937, 1946-	8	2025
Eltham		Panthers	Eltham Central Park, Eltham	VFLSD	1909	1922-1935, 1938-	13	2023
Greensborough		Boro	War Memorial Park, Greensborough	HDFL	1893	1922-	18	2014
Heidelberg		Tigers	Warringal Park, Heidelberg	VFLSD	1876	1923-1925, 1928-1934, 1937-	25	2026
Hurstbridge		Bridges, Blues	Ben Frilay Memorial Oval, Hurstbridge	PHFL	1914	1923-1924, 1929, 1931, 1937-1938, 1988-	3	2016
Montmorency		Magpies	Montmorency Park, North Oval, Montmorency	–	1924	1925-1930, 1936-1940, 1946-	4	1979
North Heidelberg		Bulldogs	Shelley Street Reserve. Heidelberg Heights	–	1958	1958-1972, 1974-	8	2017
Old Paradians		Raiders	Garvey Oval, Bundoora	VAFA	1929	2024-	2	2026

==== Division 2 ====
Club	Jumper	Nickname	Home Ground	Former League	Est.	Years in NFNL	NFNL Senior Premierships	
Club	Jumper	Nickname	Home Ground	Former League	Est.	Years in NFNL	Total	Most recent
Fitzroy Stars		Stars	Sir Douglas Nicholls Oval, Thornbury	MNFL	1973	2008-	1	2025
Ivanhoe		Hoers	Ivanhoe Park, Ivanhoe	VAFA	1910	2024-	1	2026
Lower Plenty		Bears	Montmorency Park, South Oval, Montmorency	SFL	1961	1995-	3	2018
Macleod		Kangaroos	De Winton Park, Rosanna	–	1946	1947-	3	2015
Northcote Park		Cougars	Bill Lawry Oval, Northcote	PHFL	1952	1981-	8	2012
South Morang		Lions	Mill Park Lakes Reserve, South Morang	–	1954	1955-	3	2024
St Mary's		Burra	Whatmough Park, Greensborough	–	2009	2010-	1	2018
Thomastown		Bears	Main Street Reserve, Thomastown	VAFA	1976	2001-	2	2014
West Preston Lakeside		Roosters	J E Moore Park, Reservoir	–	1998	1998-	4	2019
Whittlesea		Eagles	Whittlesea Showgrounds, Whittlesea	RDFNL	1896	1934-1939, 1946, 1992-	4	2019

==== Division 3 ====
Club	Jumper	Nickname	Home Ground	Former League	Est.	Years in NFNL	NFNL Senior Premierships	
Club	Jumper	Nickname	Home Ground	Former League	Est.	Years in NFNL	Total	Most recent
Epping		Blues, Pingers	Epping Recreation Reserve, Epping	BEFL	1904	1933-	9	2012
Heidelberg West		Hawks	Heidelberg Park, Heidelberg	VAFA	1936	1941-	1	1941
Kilmore		Blues	JJ Clancy Reserve, Kilmore	RDFL	1887	2016-	0	-
Kinglake		Lakers	Kinglake Memorial Reserve, Kinglake	YVMDFL, OEFNL	1925	1996-2000, 2002-2007, 2023-	0	-
Lalor		Bloods	Lalor Reserve, Lalor	PHFL	1955	1968-	8	2007
Laurimar		Power	Laurimar Reserve, Doreen	–	2017	2017-	1	2023
Mernda (Plenty Rovers 1932-64)	(1941,1946) (1987-1999) (2018-)	Demons	Waterview Recreation Reserve, Mernda	PHFL	1891	1937-1939, 1941, 1946, 1987-	2	2012
Old Eltham Collegians		Turtles	Eltham College Reserve, Research	VAFA	1986	2019-	0	-
Panton Hill		Redbacks	Cracknell Reserve, Panton Hill	YVMDFL	1926	1929-1930, 1997-	2	2019
Reservoir		Mustangs	Crispe Park, Reservoir	PHFL	1923	1946-1948, 1981-2006, 2008-2015, 2017-	4	2015
Watsonia		Saints	A K Lines Reserve, Watsonia	PHFL	1967	1969-	2	2016

==== Promotion and Relegation ====
At the end of each year the Premiers of Division 2 and 3 are promoted, while the clubs that finish bottom in Division 1 and 2 are relegated.

=== Division Promotion and Relegation Timeline^{Note} ===
Note:

- In 1938, Diamond Creek and Hurstbridge lacked senior players due to WWII. Having a number of boys still wanting to play, they decided to merge their clubs and play as 'Diamond Valley Juniors' against other junior teams in the Melbourne Boys League. In 1939, enough senior players were found to form a team and Diamond Valley Juniors entered a senior team into the DVFL competition from 1939 to 1941. After WWII, Diamond Creek and Hurstbridge returned to playing as separate clubs.
- In 1987, Watsonia won the Division 2 Premiership, but declined to compete in Division 1 due to concerns regarding financial stability and competitiveness: the DVFL allowed Reservoir-Lakeside (the 1987 runners-up) to be promoted to Division 1 for the 1988 season to avoid a bye.
- In 1997, Reservoir-Lakeside asked to be relegated to Division 2 due to an exodus of players, leaving a nine team Division 1 and a bye for that season: Greensborough avoided relegation since Reservoir-Lakeside had dropped before the season began. At the end of the 1997 season, Reservoir-Lakeside (Div 2) and West Preston (Div 1) merged to become West Preston-Lakeside and played the 1998 season in Division 1.
- In 2015, Reservoir won the Division 3 Premiership, but went into recess before the 2016 season, leaving Division 2 with seven teams and requiring a bye.
- In 2018, Lalor requested relegation to Division 3 due to an exodus of players, so that the club could survive and rebuild. The NFL granted Lalor's request, trading places with Epping who agreed to be promoted from Division 3 to Division 2 for the 2018 season to avoid a bye.
- In 2019, the league decided to move to a ten team Division 1 & 2 and an eight team Division 3 structure for the 2020 season with Old Eltham Collegians's successful transfer from the VAFA into the NFNL's Division 3 for the 2019 season. This decision created a nine team Division 2 and 3 for the 2019 season: the league thus promoted the 2018 Division 3 premier, St Mary's, to Division 2 and allowed the last placed 2018 Division 2 team, Watsonia to avoid relegation. At the conclusion of the 2019 season, Panton Hill were promoted to Division 2 after winning the Division 3 premiership and last placed Epping avoided relegation, thus completing the competition restructure.
- In 2021, the season commenced but was interrupted several times due to Victoria being locked down due to COVID-19 outbreaks. A lengthy lock down occurred at the end of the home and away season which caused the finals series to be cancelled. It was subsequently decided that there would be no promotion or relegation between the divisions, however the Best and Fairest and Leading Goal Kicker awards were presented.

=== Premiers ===
==== Premiership Table ====
	Seniors			Reserves			Thirds		
Club	Div 1	Div 2	Div 3	Div 1	Div 2	Div 3	Div 1	Div 2	Div 3
Heidelberg	25	1	-	18	1	-	4	1	-
Greensborough	17	1	-	7	2	-	13	2	-
Eltham	8	7	-	3	4	-	3	-	-
Epping	6	3	-	1	2	-	2	-	-
North Heidelberg	6	2	-	11	1	-	5	1	-
Northcote Park / Northcote Park – Alphington	6	2	-	-	2	-	6	2	-
Lalor	5	3	-	3	3	-	4	2	-
Bundoora	5	1	-	13	-	-	4	1	-
Diamond Creek	4	4	-	1	6	-	-	3	-
Montmorency	4	-	-	7	-	-	7	-	-
West Preston Lakeside	4	-	-	2	-	-	3	-	-
Reservoir – Lakeside	3	-	-	6	2	-	7	1	-
Reservoir	2	1	1	-	2	1	-	3	-
Macleod – Rosanna / Macleod	2	1	-	5	-	-	2	3	-
Templestowe	2	-	-	-	-	-	1	-	-
Heidelberg West	1	-	-	1	-	1	1	-	-
Whittlesea	-	4	-	-	3	-	-	3	-
West Preston	-	3	-	-	6	-	-	1	-
Lower Plenty	-	3	-	-	1	-	-	4	-
Hurstbridge	-	2	1	-	-	1^{Note}	-	1	-
South Morang	-	1	2	1	2	2	-	2	-
Mernda / Plenty Rovers	-	1	1	-	2	1	-	1	-
Thomastown	-	1	1	-	2	-	-	1	1
Watsonia	-	1	1	-	-	1	1	-	1
Banyule	-	1	1	-	-	1	-	1	1
Old Paradians	-	1	1	-	-	-	-	-	-
Panton Hill	-	-	2	-	-	1	-	-	-
Fitzroy Stars	-	-	1	-	1	-	-	-	-
St Mary's	-	-	1	-	-	3	-	2	-
Ivanhoe	-	-	1	-	-	1	-	-	-
Laurimar	-	-	1	-	-	1	-	-	-
Parkside	-	-	1^{Note}	-	-	-	-	-	-
Research	-	-	-	-	1	-	-	1	-
Kilmore	-	-	-	-	-	1	-	-	1
Old Eltham Collegians	-	-	-	-	-	1	-	-	-
Thornbury	-	-	-	-	-	-	-	1	-
Wallan	-	-	-	-	-	-	-	1	-
West Lalor	-	-	-	-	-	-	-	1	-
Total	99	44	16^{Note}	78	44	16^{Note}	63	39	4

Clubs in Italics no longer participate in the NFNL due to merging, folding or transferring to another league.

==== Division 1 ====
NFL	Seniors	Captain	Coach	Reserves	Under 19s
2026	Heidelberg	Keenan Posar	Vin Dattoli	Montmorency	Heidelberg
2025	Heidelberg	Keenan Posar	Vin Dattoli	Heidelberg	Heidelberg
2024	Heidelberg	Keenan Posar	Vin Dattoli	Heidelberg	Heidelberg
2023	Heidelberg	Sam Gilmore	Vin Dattoli	Heidelberg	Greensborough
2022	Heidelberg	Sam Gilmore	Danny Nolan	Bundoora	Montmorency
2020 Competition and 2021 Finals suspended due to COVID-19 pandemic
2019	West Preston-Lakeside	Nathan Valladares Ahmed Saad	Rob Maiorana	Bundoora	Eltham
2018	West Preston-Lakeside	Nathan Valladares Ahmed Saad	Rob Maiorana	Bundoora	Montmorency
2017	Bundoora	Brent Marshall	Ricky Dyson	Greensborough	Eltham
2016	Heidelberg	Michael Brunelli	Charles Gaylard	Heidelberg	Greensborough
2015	Macleod	Kane Shaw	Garry Ramsay	Greensborough	Greensborough
2014	Greensborough	Lachlan Mcquilken; Tim Bongetti; Matthew Hyde	Robert Hyde	West Preston-Lakeside	Greensborough
2013	Bundoora	Brayden Shaw; Micheal Farrelly	Phil Plunkett	Heidelberg	West Preston-Lakeside
2012	Northcote Park	Bronik Davies	Jason Heatley	West Preston-Lakeside	Northcote Park
2011	Bundoora	Brayden Shaw	Phil Maylin	Montmorency	Greensborough
2010	West Preston Lakeside	Nick Meese	Vin Dattoli	Bundoora	Greensborough
2009	Heidelberg	Abe Williams	Phil Plunkett	Bundoora	Greensborough
2008	Heidelberg	Blair Harvey	Phil Plunkett	Heidelberg	West Preston Lakeside
2007	Heidelberg	Blair Harvey	Phil Plunkett	Heidelberg	Eltham
DVFL	Seniors	Captain	Coach	Reserves	Thirds
2006	Heidelberg	Blair Harvey	Craig Hunter	Bundoora	West Preston Lakeside
2005	North Heidelberg	Leigh Gray	Brett Hancock	Montmorency	N'cote Park/Alphington
2004	Heidelberg	Blair Harvey	Craig Hunter	Heidelberg	N'cote Park/Alphington
2003	West Preston Lakeside	Fabian Carelli	Ryan Smith	Bundoora	N'cote Park/Alphington
2002	Northcote Park	Matthew Amad	Peter Dean	Montmorency	Bundoora
2001	Northcote Park	Matthew Amad	Vin Hanlon	Heidelberg	Montmorency
2000	Northcote Park	Matthew Amad	Steve Easton	Heidelberg	Bundoora
1999	Northcote Park	Matthew Amad	Steve Easton	Bundoora	N'cote Park/Alphington
1998	Lalor	Darryl Sinclair	Ray Shaw	Lalor	N'cote Park/Alphington
1997	Northcote Park	John Origlasso	Steve Easton	Bundoora	Epping
1996	Bundoora	Trevor Robinson	Gary Massey	Bundoora	North Heidelberg
1995	Bundoora	Trevor Robinson	Gary Massey	Montmorency	Lalor
1994	North Heidelberg	Mark Perkins	Mark Perkins	North Heidelberg	Montmorency
1993	Lalor	Graham Spillard	Steve Easton	Bundoora	Epping
1992	Lalor	Steve Petrucelle	Steve Easton	North Heidelberg	Reservoir-Lakeside
1991	Lalor	Brett Mancini	Barry Rist	Bundoora	Montmorency
1990	Heidelberg	Nick Delanty	Michael Sullivan	North Heidelberg	Greensborough
1989	Greensborough	Brett Fowler	Harold Martin	North Heidelberg	North Heidelberg
1988	Greensborough	Wayne Dobson	Greg Jones	North Heidelberg	Bundoora
1987	North Heidelberg	Paul Storey	Gary Massey	North Heidelberg	Lalor
1986	Heidelberg	Ray Shephard	Michael Sullivan	North Heidelberg	Bundoora
1985	North Heidelberg	Paul Storey	Gary Massey	North Heidelberg	Lalor
1984	Greensborough	Robert Hyde	Robert Hyde	Greensborough	North Heidelberg
1983	Greensborough	Robert Hyde	Robert Hyde	Bundoora	Lalor
1982	Diamond Creek	John O'Connell	John O'Connell	Montmorency	Templestowe
1981	Diamond Creek	John O'Connell	John O'Connell	Lalor	Montmorency
1980	Lalor	Chris Valerkou	Barry Rist	Lalor	Heidelberg
1979	Montmorency	Shane Molloy	Shane Molloy	Montmorency	Greensborough
1978	North Heidelberg	Kevin Grose	Kevin Grose	Reservoir-Lakeside	Reservoir-Lakeside
1977	Reservoir-Lakeside	Dennis Le Gassick	Bob Edmonds	North Heidelberg	Watsonia
1976	Montmorency	Lee Adamson	Lee Adamson	North Heidelberg	Reservoir-Lakeside
1975	Reservoir-Lakeside	Dennis Le Gassick	Kevin Egan	Reservoir-Lakeside	Reservoir-Lakeside
1974	Eltham	Bernie Massey	Bernie Massey	Eltham	Greensborough
1973	Templestowe	Garry Dyring	Barry Rist	Macleod-Rosanna	Reservoir-Lakeside
1972	Eltham	John Newnham	Ray Slocum	Greensborough	Greensborough
1971	Macleod-Rosanna	Kevin Simpson	Kevin Dillon	Eltham	Reservoir-Lakeside
1970	Eltham	John Walker	John Walker	Reservoir-Lakeside	Greensborough
1969	Eltham	Barry Capuano	Hugh Mitchell	Reservoir-Lakeside	Greensborough
1968	Templestowe	Craig Chivers	Bob Symes	South Morang	Reservoir-Lakeside
1967	Greensborough	John Carmody	John Carmody	Heidelberg	Montmorency
1966	Greensborough	John Carmody	John Carmody	Reservoir-Lakeside	Heidelberg West
1965	Reservoir-Lakeside	Graham Campbell	Graham Campbell	Reservoir-Lakeside	Macleod-Rosanna
1964	Heidelberg	Brian McMahon	Brian McMahon	North Heidelberg	Macleod-Rosanna
1963	Epping	Trevor Johnson	Trevor Johnson	Heidelberg	North Heidelberg
1962	North Heidelberg	Ron Buckley	Eddie Draper	Greensborough	North Heidelberg
1961	Greensborough	Joe Murphy	Joe Murphy	Greensborough	
1960	Greensborough	Joe Murphy	Joe Murphy	Heidelberg	
1959	Heidelberg	Peter Gurry	Peter Gurry	Macleod-Rosanna	
1958	Greensborough	Frank Londrigan	Frank Londrigan	Macleod-Rosanna	
1957	Heidelberg	Kevin Hart	Kevin Hart	Macleod-Rosanna	
1956	Heidelberg	Kevin Hart	Kevin Hart	Heidelberg	
1955	Greensborough	Fred Anderson	Fred Anderson	Heidelberg West	
1954	Montmorency	R. Hibbert	Phil Ryan	Greensborough	
1953	Eltham	Keith Headon	Jack Harding	Heidelberg	
1952	Greensborough	Percy Adamson	Percy Adamson	Epping	
1951	Montmorency	Phil Ryan	Phil Ryan	Heidelberg	
1950	Heidelberg	R. Clarke	R. Clarke	Heidelberg	
1949	Eltham	G.Hunter	Henry Downing	Diamond Creek	
1948	Heidelberg	G. Irvine	Alan Stott	Macleod-Rosanna	
1947	Reservoir	Don Atkinson	Don Atkinson	Eltham	
1946	Reservoir	Ron McConchie	Tom Manchester		
1942–1945 Competition suspended due to World War II
1941	Heidelberg West	Plunkett			
1940	Epping	Eddie Worthington			
1939	Epping	Eddie Worthington			
1938	Heidelberg	Alan Stott	Alan Stott		
1937	Heidelberg	Alan Stott	Alan Stott		
1936	Epping	Tom Dea			
1935	Epping	Tom Dea			
1934	Greensborough	Vin Broderick			
1933	Epping	W. Callaghan			
1932	Eltham	H.Weidlich	A.Parsons		
1931	Greensborough	Bill McDowell			
1930	Eltham	A.Parsons	A.Parsons		
1929	Heidelberg	D. O'Keefe			
1928	Heidelberg	G. Rank			
1927	Greensborough	Tony Crees			
1926	Diamond Creek	E. Murray			
1925	Greensborough	Gus Lines			
1924	Diamond Creek	Richard Wadeson			
1923	Heidelberg	W. Parsons			
1922	Greensborough	Harold Hodgson			

==== Division 2 ====
NFNL	Seniors	Captain	Coach	Reserves	Under 19s
2026	Old Paradians	Kyle O’Sullivan	Ben Turner	Whittlesea	South Morang
2025	Diamond Creek	Nathan Searle	Andrew Tranquilli	Whittlesea	North Heidelberg
2024	South Morang	Tye Hall	Gary Hall	South Morang	St Mary's
2023	Eltham	Darcy Vallance; Jackson Weatherald	Tim Bongetti	Eltham	Diamond Creek
2022	Banyule	Devin McDonald	Ricky Dyson	Eltham	Banyule
2020 Competition and 2021 Finals suspended due to COVID-19 pandemic
2019	Whittlesea	Riley Dyson	Blair Harvey	Fitzroy Stars	South Morang
2018	Lower Plenty	Patrick Flynn	Ben Turner	Eltham	Heidelberg
2017	North Heidelberg	Daniel Bramich	Stephen Saddington	Diamond Creek	Lower Plenty
2016	Hurstbridge	Sean Jellie; Brayden Shaw	Trevor Frost; Rob Dyson	Thomastown	Diamond Creek
2015	Whittlesea	Andrew Fairchild	Brad Dean	Thomastown	Whittlesea
2014	North Heidelberg	Leigh Gilbert	Stephen Saddington	North Heidelberg	St Mary's
2013	Whittlesea	Roy Dyson; Garrett Heenan	Peter Bugden	Diamond Creek	Whittlesea
2012	Epping	Daniel Moore	Mario Bandera	Diamond Creek	Thomastown
2011	Lower Plenty	Billy Barden	Gary Ramsay	Lower Plenty	Lower Plenty
2010	Whittlesea	Garret Heenan	Peter Budgen	Mernda	Diamond Creek
2009	Macleod	Kane Shaw	Christian Brandt	Diamond Creek	Whittlesea
2008	Thomastown	Barry McDonald; Vince Capeci	Dean Sinclair	Mernda	Macleod
2007	Lalor	Steven Marshall	Mark Pederson	Thomastown	Mernda
DVFL	Seniors	Captain	Coach	Reserves	Thirds
2006	Greensborough	Paul Hattenfels	Russell Dickson	Greensborough	Greensborough
2005	Diamond Creek	Shannon Logan	Neale Carroll	Greensborough	Macleod
2004	Lalor	Steve Marshall	Gavin Langbourne	Lalor	Greensborough
2003	Hurstbridge	Jai Audley	Rob Dyson	Lalor	Lalor
2002	Eltham	Craig McKay	Wayne Freeman	South Morang	Wallan
2001	Lalor	Darryl Sinclair	Darryl Sinclair	Lalor	Lalor
2000	Eltham	Mark Minney	Gary Jessop	Eltham	Bundoora
1999	Lower Plenty	Paul Hicks	Paul Hicks	Whittlesea	Lower Plenty
1998	Diamond Creek	Steven Legg	Danny Davenport	Diamond Creek	Reservoir
1997	Eltham	Paul Smith	Ray Spratt	Diamond Creek	Lower Plenty
1996	West Preston	Adam Bruni	Harold Martin	West Preston	Research
1995	Eltham	Paul Smith	Grant Wilmot	West Preston	Hurstbridge
1994	Northcote Park	Dave Robertson	Dave Robertson	Northcote Park	
1993	West Preston	Pat Fitzgerald	Andrew Smith	West Preston	Macleod Juniors
1992	Diamond Creek	Greg Elliot	Jon Collins	West Preston	West Lalor
1991	Mernda	Simon Smythe	Vin Hanlon	West Preston	
1990	Epping	Kalev Vann	Graham Bux	Epping	
1989	Eltham	Andrew Russell	Peter Moore	Epping	
1988	West Preston	Phil Crapper	Mark Duckworth	Research	
1987	Watsonia	Adrian Sanderson	Barry Rist	Reservoir Lakeside	Thornbury
1986	Epping	Matt Scully	Matt Scully	Reservoir Lakeside	West Preston
1985	Northcote Park	Wayne Bannister	Wayne Bannister	West Preston	Reservoir Lakeside
1984	Reservoir	Rob Docherty	Harold Martin	Reservoir	Reservoir
1983	Heidelberg	Michael Sullivan	Michael Sullivan	Northcote Park	Reservoir
1982	Eltham	Warren Deards	Hassa Mann	Reservoir	Northcote Park
1981	Bundoora	Mark Slater	Mark Slater	Heidelberg	Northcote Park

==== Division 3 ====
NFL	Seniors	Captain	Coach	Reserves	Thirds
2026	Ivanhoe	Alex Federico	Wayne Schultz	Ivanhoe	No Competition
2025	Fitzroy Stars	Kain Proctor	Neville Jetta	Laurimar	Kilmore
2024	Old Paradians	Marcus Nolan	Ben Turner	Kilmore	Banyule 2
2023	Laurimar	Luke Wilson; Mitch Thompson	Jimmy Atkins	Old Eltham Collegians	Thomastown
2022	South Morang	Matt Robinson	Gary Hall	South Morang	Watsonia
2020 Competition and 2021 Finals suspended due to COVID-19 pandemic
2019	Panton Hill	Mitchell Anderson	Steve Layt	Heidelberg West	
2018	St Mary's	Dillan Ronalds	Fabian Carelli	St Mary's	
2017	Banyule	Scott Gumbleton	Pete Davey	St Mary's	
2016	Watsonia	Matthew Crompton	Corey McCall	St Mary's	
2015	Reservoir	Danny O'Sullivan; Ryan Docherty	Ross Terranova	Banyule	
2014	Thomastown	Anthony Fazzari	Dean Sinclair	Reservoir	
2013	Panton Hill	Will Box	Dean Haydock	Watsonia	
2012	Mernda	Rohan Davies	Brett Wilson	Mernda	
2011	South Morang	Daniel Heatley	Gary Kallinikos	Panton Hill	
2010	Hurstbridge	Michael Richards	Darren Blyth	South Morang	
2009^{Note}	Parkside	Rob Wise	Peter Dean	Hurstbridge	

=== Awards ===
==== Division 1 ====
NFL	Best and Fairest Frank Rosbrook Medal		Leading Goal Kicker			Best on Ground in Grand Final	
Year	Player	Club	Player	Club	Goals	Player	Club
2025	Tom Keys	Heidelberg	Joel Naylor	Hurstbridge	50	Marcus Herbert	Heidelberg
2024	Tom Keys	Heidelberg	Parker Heatley	North Heidelberg	59	Ben De Bolfo	Heidelberg
2023	Lachlan Wilson	Heidelberg	Patrick Fitzgerald	Montmorency	72	Matthew Smith	Heidelberg
2022	Matthew Harman	West Preston-Lakeside	Patrick Fitzgerald	Montmorency	67	Matthew Smith	Heidelberg
2021	Lachlan Wilson	Heidelberg	Ahmed Saad	West Preston-Lakeside	54	2021 Finals suspended due to COVID-19 pandemic	
2020 Competition suspended due to COVID-19 pandemic
2019	Tom Bell	Greensborough	Ahmed Saad	West Preston-Lakeside	76	Luke Lirosi	West Preston-Lakeside
2018	Lucas Hobbs; Michael Brunelli	Macleod; Heidelberg	Shane Harvey	North Heidelberg	72	Mark Kovacevic	West Preston-Lakeside
2017	Matthew Dennis	Bundoora	Ahmed Saad	West Preston-Lakeside	73	Matthew Dennis	Bundoora
2016	Matthew Dennis	Bundoora	Gary Moorcroft	Bundoora	64	Lachlan Wilson	Heidelberg
2015	Matt Vasilevski	Lower Plenty	James Kroussoratis	Eltham	65	Liam Brandt	Macleod
2014	Bronik Davies; Matt Vasilevski	Northcote Park; Lower Plenty	Patrick Fitzgerald	Montmorency	68	Michael Hooper	Greensborough
2013	Cameron Cloke	Bundoora	Cameron Cloke	Bundoora	93	Brayden Shaw	Bundoora
2012	Bronik Davies; Matthew Dennis	Northcote Park; Bundoora	Gary Moorcroft	Bundoora	75	Anthony Hogan	Northcote Park
2011	Michael Finn	Heidelberg	Dean Limbach	Montmorency	83	Micheal Farrelly	Bundoora
2010	Nick Meese	West Preston Lakeside	Saul Caddy	Heidelberg	82	Jake Williams	West Preston Lakeside
2009	Daniel Keenan	Montmorency	Shane Harvey	North Heidelberg	102	Dean Haydock	Heidelberg
2008	Shane Harvey; Daniel Keenan; David Mitchell	North Heidelberg; Montmorency; Bundoora	Shane Harvey	North Heidelberg	108	Blair Harvey	Heidelberg
2007	Daniel McFerran	West Preston L'side	Chris Hall; Shaun Ryan	Heidelberg; North Heidelberg	72	Michael Gay	Heidelberg
DVFL	Best and Fairest Frank Smith Medal		Leading Goal Kicker			Best on Ground in Grand Final Gary Massey Medal	
2006	Brett Jeffrey	Northcote Park	Adrian Baker	West Preston L'side	73	Dale Nolan	Heidelberg
2005	Daniel King	Epping	Chris Hall	Heidelberg	102	Jake King	North Heidelberg
2004	Daniel King	Epping	Cristian Brandt	North Heidelberg	78	Chris Hall	Heidelberg
2003	Fabian Carelli	West Preston L'side	Peter Van Blommestein	Heidelberg	87	Damien Walsh-Quay	West Preston L'side
2002	Mario Bandera	North Heidelberg	Steve Bawden	Epping	87		
2001	Dean Haydock	Heidelberg	Jason Heatley	North Heidelberg	110		
2000	Paul King	Bundoora	Damien Yze	Northcote Park	99		
1999	Leigh Gray	North Heidelberg	Jamie Shaw	North Heidelberg	134		
1998	Ryan Smith	Heidelberg	Athas Hrysoulakis	Lalor	88		
1997	Barry Mitchell	Northcote Park	Jamie Shaw	North Heidelberg	114		
1996	John Origlasso	Northcote Park	Jamie Shaw	North Heidelberg	88		
1995	Adrian Cameron	Bundoora	Jamie Shaw	North Heidelberg	113		
1994	Renato Marinelli	Diamond Creek	Jamie Shaw	North Heidelberg	161		
1993	Kevin Brown	Bundoora	Brett Hancock	North Heidelberg	97		
1992	Chris Keating	Bundoora	Jason Heatley	North Heidelberg	118		
1991	Peter Woodward; Neil Brindley; Peter Mastin	Montmorency; Greensborough; Greensborough	Jamie Solyom	Lalor	73		
1990	Chris Keating	Bundoora	David Miller	Heidelberg	95		
1989	Richard Guldon	Heidelberg	Steve Webster	Montmorency	62		
1988	Brad Dunbar	Heidelberg West	Steve Webster	Montmorency	57		
1987	Wayne Dobson	Greensborough	Steve Webster	Montmorency	83		
1986	Mark Perkins	Heidelberg West	Mark Johnson	North Heidelberg	59		
1985	Darryl Harries	Lalor	Glenn Townsend	Greensborough	103		
1984	Kelvin Wood	Heidelberg West	Russell Jessop	Lalor	103		
1983	Wayne Dobson	Greensborough	Bill Seiler	Diamond Creek	82		
1982	Wayne Headlam	Diamond Creek	Bill Seiler	Diamond Creek	86		
1981	Wayne Headlam	Diamond Creek	Bill Seiler	Diamond Creek	82		
1980	Elias Demestichas	South Morang	Keith Robbins	Lalor	90		
1979	John Ellis	Watsonia	Robert Downie	Watsonia	64		
1978	Mario Cipolla	North Heidelberg	Kevin Grose; Graeme Fraser	North Heidelberg; Montmorency	80		
1977	Jeff Edwards	North Heidelberg	Ron Wilson	South Morang	83		
1976	John Horton	Diamond Creek	Bruce McDowell	Greensborough	97		
1975	John Clancy	Heidelberg	Bruce McDowell	Greensborough	86		
1974	Mario Cipolla	North Heidelberg	Lindsay Hopkins	Templestowe	66		
1973	Stephen Thorpe	Templestowe	Ivan Bromley	Reservoir-Lakeside	87		
1972	Robin Perkins	Heidelberg	Ivan Bromley	Reservoir-Lakeside	115		
1971	Jim Christou	Heidelberg	John Horton	Diamond Creek	78		
1970	Frank Natoli	Reservoir Lakeside	John Vadja	Macleod-Rosanna	81		
1969	Geoff Noble	Macleod-Rosanna	Ted Wallace	Templestowe	94		
1968	Dennis Aspinall	Eltham	Bill Chapman	Macleod-Rosanna	73		
1967	Geoff Condie	Diamond Creek	Bernie Drury	Montmorency	69		
1966	Ken Jones; Graham Campbell	Diamond Creek; Reservoir-Lakeside	Max Condie	Diamond Creek	81		
1965	Graham Campbell	Reservoir-Lakeside	Doug Hayes	Reservoir-Lakeside	85		
1964	Pat Foley	Heidelberg West	Claude Howard	Heidelberg	74		
1963	Pat Foley	Heidelberg West	Gerald Walsh	Epping	96		
1962	Ken Jones	Montmorency	Gerald Walsh	Epping	70		
1961	Joe Murphy	Greensborough	Les Cann	Reservoir Lakeside	68		
1960	Clem Cooper	Epping	Ivan Francis	Heidelberg West	67		
1959	John Elliot	Diamond Creek	Ed Crawley	Heidelberg West	70		
1958	John Elliot; Don McDowell	Diamond Creek; Greensborough	Gerald Walsh	Epping	81		
1957	John Elliot	Diamond Creek	Ray Skals	Greensborough	96		
1956	Jack Davies	Epping	Les Cann	Montmorency	85		
1955	Kevin Hart	Macleod	Ron Denmead	Montmorency	65		
1954	Joe Murphy; Doug King	Greensborough; Reservoir-Lakeside	Ron Denmead	Montmorency	126		
1953	Jack Tucker	Heidelberg West	Roy Kelly	Eltham	64		
1952	Kevin Hart	Macleod	Wally Dingle	Montmorency	71		
1951	Joe Adams	Epping	Brian Gillberg	Montmorency	74		
1950	Geoff Heddle	Diamond Creek	Bill Harvey	Heidelberg	102		
1949	Geoff Heddle	Diamond Creek	Jack Dempster	Templestowe	97		
1948	Jack Dempster	Templestowe	Gordon Hastings	Reservoir	68		
1947	Reg Milburn	Epping	Gordon Hastings	Reservoir	112		
1946	Joe Delaney	Heidelberg	Gordon Hastings	Reservoir	73		
1937	Jim Giddens	Plenty Rovers					
1933			J West	Eltham	128		

==== Division 2 ====
	Best and Fairest		Leading Goal Kicker			Best on Ground in Grand Final John Elliot Medal	
Year	Player	Club	Player	Club	Goals	Player	Club
2025	Taj Logan	Diamond Creek	Darcy Barden	Macleod	102	Jacob Booth	Diamond Creek
2024	Taidhg Bland	Whittlesea	Ethan Lowe	Watsonia	57	Nathan Stefanile	South Morang
2023	Tane Cotter	St Marys	James Lucente	Watsonia	59	Finbar Maley	Eltham
2022	Darcy Barden	Lower Plenty	Jack Langford	Banyule	59	Tim Martin	Banyule
2021	Tom Keys	Lower Plenty	Jack Langford; Ryan Pingree	Banyule; Diamond Creek	29	2021 Finals suspended due to COVID-19 pandemic	
2020 Competition suspended due to COVID-19 pandemic
2019	Xavier Dimasi; Riley Loton; Brent Macaffer	Whittlesea; Banyule; Eltham	Michael Still	Eltham	44	Xavier Dimasi	Whittlesea
2018	Patrick Flynn	Lower Plenty	James Kroussoratis	Banyule	71	Patrick Flynn	Lower Plenty
2017	Brent Harvey	North Heidelberg	Shane Harvey	North Heidelberg	106	Jesse Tardio	North Heidelberg
2016	Tyron Loader	Hurstbridge	Daniel Francis	Fitzroy Stars	68	Brayden Shaw	Hurstbridge
2015	Shane Jacobs	Lalor	Todd Hughes	Lalor	81	Todd Behan	Whittlesea
2014	Tyler Scarce	Panton Hill	Shane Harvey	North Heidelberg	110	Jesse Tardio	North Heidelberg
2013	Rohan Davies	Mernda	Shane Harvey	North Heidelberg	123	Malcolm Dow*	Fitzroy Stars
2012	Lionel Proctor	Fitzroy Stars	Shane Harvey	North Heidelberg	103	Shane Harvey*	North Heidelberg
2011	Darcy Barden	Lower Plenty	Peter Shepherd	Lalor	93	Darcy Barden	Lower Plenty
2010	Luke Jackson	Diamond Creek	Benjamin Gill	Lower Plenty	59	Lucas Hobbs	Whittlesea
2009	Daniel Moore	Epping	John Hayes	Fitzroy Stars	89	Kane Shaw	Macleod
2008	Lionel Proctor	Fitzroy Stars	Aaron Willitts	Epping	78	Stefan Berak	Thomastown
2007	Andrew Bennett	Macleod	Cristian Brandt	Macleod	109	Nick Mafilovski	Lalor
2006	Daniel Eifermann	Whittlesea	Nick Lynch	Macleod	102	David Hutchison	Greensborough
2005	Ryan Bongetti	South Morang	Tom Felle	Mernda	104	Shannon Logan	Diamond Creek
2004	William Box	Panton Hill	Aaron James	Lalor	114	Paul Briggs	Lalor
2003	Jai Audley	Hurstbridge	Toby O'Meara	Reservoir	73	Justin Crowe	Hurstbridge
2002	Heath Ayres	Wallan	Adam Bruni	Reservoir	82		
2001	Tony Callea	Fawkner Park	Paul Baker	Whittlesea	107		
2000	Paul Eccles	Watsonia	Gavin Tapner	Watsonia	90		
1999	Mark Spiteri	Kinglake	Ron McKeown	Whittlesea	114		
1998	Dean Harrington	Whittlesea	Jamie Bown	Whittlesea	79		
1997	Ray Buttigieg; Tony Maraschiello	South Morang; Mernda	Paul Baker	Kinglake	102		
1996	Rocky Iacopino	Macleod	Paul Baker	Hurstbridge	93		
1995	Dale Carmody	West Preston	Paul Baker; David Miller	Hurstbridge; West Preston	85		
1994	Billy Colosimo	Reservoir	Paul Baker	Hurstbridge	139		
1993	Adam Bruni	West Preston	Paul Baker	Hurstbridge	116		
1992	Paul Tilley	West Preston	Cristian Brandt	West Preston	68		
1991	Robert Mietus	Hurstbridge	Greg Withers	Heidelberg West	80		
1990	Malcolm Griffiths; John Hassell	Watsonia; Mernda	Steve Webster	Epping	96		
1989	Brett Johnstone; Glenn Whittenbury	South Morang; Templestowe	Malcolm Niddrie	Templestowe	92		
1988	Steve Easton	Research	Darren Scott	Epping	80		
1987	Greg Fyffe	West Preston	Ron Wilson	Eltham	83		
1986	Stan Apostola	Epping	Darren Scott	Epping	97		
1985	Les Pugh	Thornbury	Warren Jarman	Eltham	72		
1984	Adrian Sullivan	West Preston	Steve Banbury	West Preston	56		
1983	Bernie Nicholson	Macleod–Rosanna	Peter McNiece	Northcote Park	83		
1982	Anthony McFarlane; Glenn Irving	Eltham; Eltham	Peter Lowe	Macleod-Rosanna	85		
1981	Mark Slater	Bundoora	Rob Michaelangeli	Northcote Park	76		

- Player awarded Best on Ground despite playing for the losing team

==== Division 3 ====
	Best and Fairest		Leading Goal Kicker			Best on Ground in Grand Final	
Year	Player	Club	Player	Club	Goals	Player	Club
2025	Bailey Robinson; Kane Veliou	Kinglake; Ivanhoe	Patrick Fitzgerald	Laurimar	88	Eddie Betts	Fitzroy Stars
2024	Brent Macaffer	Old Eltham Collegians	Sam Rexhepi	Lalor	55	Lachie Kerr	Old Paradians
2023	Lachlan Evans	Heidelberg West	Matthew Williamson	Old Eltham Collegians	63	Joshua Leather	Laurimar
2022	Chris Ryall	Kilmore	Jackson Cecil	Laurimar	84	James Hewson	South Morang
2021	Chris Ryall	Kilmore	Josh Williamson	Laurimar	43	2021 Finals suspended due to COVID-19 pandemic	
2020 Competition suspended due to COVID-19 pandemic
2019	Jarryd Coulson	Heidelberg West	Rhys Boyden	Panton Hill	62	Daniel Freeman	Panton Hill
2018	Jarryd Coulson	Heidelberg West	Rhys Boyden	Panton Hill	76	Myles Gouldon	St.Marys
2017	Jarryd Coulson	Heidelberg West	James Kroussoratis	Banyule	74	Scott Gumbleton	Banyule
2016	Matthew Crompton	Watsonia	Aaron Willits	Epping	67	Levi Moss	Watsonia
2015	Daniel Moore	Epping	Kyl Ewart	Heidelberg West	62	Judd Darby	Reservoir
2014	Matthew Cupo; Danny O'Sullivan	Thomastown; Reservoir	Jacob Osei-Duro	Thomastown	71	Matthew Cupo	Thomastown
2013	Lochie Dornauf	Watsonia	Ben Finnin	Panton Hill	53	Abe Williams	Panton Hill
2012	Rohan Davies	Mernda	Johnathon Bryon	Panton Hill	96	Matthew Rees	Mernda
2011	Brad Hockey	Parkside	Dallas King	Parkside	60	Matthew Manning	South Morang
2010	Ryan Docherty	Reservoir	Johnathon Garrard	Panton Hill	88	Josh Saw	Hurstbridge
2009^{Note}	Robbie Wise	Parkside	Benjamin Gill	Panton Hill	63	Robbie Wise	Parkside

== Women's Senior Competition ==
The NFNL Women's Senior Competition was established in 2017. As the NFNL was one of the first metropolitan leagues in Melbourne to begin their own senior women's competition, football clubs from the EDFL, EFL, VAFA and WRFL participated in the NFNL until their own leagues established women's competitions.

There is currently no promotion or relegation between the divisions. To ensure a competitive balance each season, the competition is graded, meaning teams are placed on their level of ability rather than on how they performed the previous year.

=== Clubs ===
==== Division 1 ====
Club	Jumper	Nickname	Home Ground	Former League	Est.	Years in NFNL	NFNL Senior Premierships	
Club	Jumper	Nickname	Home Ground	Former League	Est.	Years in NFNL	Total	Most recent
Banyule		Bears	RJ Brockwell Reserve, Heidelberg	–	1974	2021-	0	-
Diamond Creek Women's		Creekers	Plenty War Memorial Oval, Plenty	VWFL	2010	2017-	2	2025
Eltham		Panthers	Eltham Central Park, Eltham	–	1909	2018-	1	2022
Fitzroy Stars		Stars	Sir Douglas Nicholls Oval, Thornbury	–	1973	2021-	1	2026
Heidelberg		Tigers	Warringal Park, Heidelberg	–	1876	2019-	0	-
Lower Plenty		Bears	Montmorency Park, South Oval, Lower Plenty	–	1961	2021-2022, 2024-	2	2025
Montmorency		Magpies	Montmorency Park, North Oval, Montmorency	VWFL	1924	2017-	1	2023
St Mary's		Burra	Whatmough Park, Greensborough	–	2009	2018-	3	2026

==== Division 2 ====
Club	Jumper	Nickname	Home Ground	Former League	Est.	Years in NFNL	NFNL Senior Premierships	
Club	Jumper	Nickname	Home Ground	Former League	Est.	Years in NFNL	Total	Most recent
Darebin		Falcons	A.H. Capp Reserve, Preston	VWFL	1990	2017-	0	-
Hurstbridge		Bridges	Ben Frilay Memorial Oval, Hurstbridge	–	1914	2019-	1	2022
Ivanhoe		Ivies	Ivanhoe Park, Ivanhoe	VAFA	1910	2024-	0	-
Kilmore		Blues	JJ Clancy Reserve, Kilmore	RDFL	1887	2025-	0	-
Macleod		Kangaroos	De Winton Park, Rosanna	–	1946	2025-	1	2026
North Heidelberg		Bulldogs	Shelley Street Reserve, Heidelberg Heights	–	1958	2023-	1	2025
Panton Hill		Redbacks	Cracknell Reserve, Panton Hill	–	1926	2024-	1	2024
Reservoir		Mustangs	Crispe Park, Reservoir	–	1923	2019–2021, 2025-	0	-
West Preston Lakeside		Roosters	J E Moore Park, Reservoir	–	1998	2017-2024, 2026-	1	2018

==== Division 3 ====
Club	Jumper	Nickname	Home Ground	Former League	Est.	Years in NFNL	NFNL Senior Premierships	
Club	Jumper	Nickname	Home Ground	Former League	Est.	Years in NFNL	Total	Most recent
Darebin reserves		Falcons	A.H. Capp Reserve, Preston	VWFL	1990	2017-	0	-
Diamond Creek Women's reserves		Creekers	Plenty War Memorial Oval, Plenty	VWFL	2010	2017-	1	2022
Eltham reserves		Panthers	Eltham Central Park, Eltham	–	1909	2018-	1	2022
Epping		Blues	Epping Recreation Reserve, Epping	–	1904	2024-	0	-
Laurimar		Power	Laurimar Reserve, Doreen	–	2017	2017-	0	-
Lower Plenty reserves		Bears	Montmorency Park, South Oval, Lower Plenty	–	1961	2021-2022, 2024-	2	2025
Mernda		Demons	Waterview Recreation Reserve, Mernda	–	1891	2018-2024, 2027-	0	-
Montmorency reserves		Magpies	Montmorency Park, North Oval, Montmorency	VWFL	1924	2017-	1	2023
St Mary's reserves		Burra	Whatmough Park, Greensborough	–	2009	2018-	2	2024
South Morang		Lions	Mill Park Lakes Reserve, South Morang	VWFL	1954	2017-2019, 2024-2025, 2027-	0	-
Thomastown		Bears	Main Street Reserve, Thomastown	–	1976	2024-	0	-
Whittlesea		Eagles	Whittlesea Showgounds,Whittlesea	–	1896	2021-	0	-

==== Women's Clubs Currently In Recess ====
Club	Jumper	Nickname	Home Ground	Former League	Est.	Years in NFNL	NFNL Senior Premierships	
Club	Jumper	Nickname	Home Ground	Former League	Est.	Years in NFNL	Total	Most recent
Bundoora		Bulls	Yulong Reserve, Bundoora	–	1974	2018-2022	1	2018
Heidelberg West		Hawks	Heidelbrg Park, Heidelberg	–	1936	2023-2025	0	-
Greensborough		Boro	War Memorial Park, Greensborough	–	1893	2018-2024	1	2019

=== Premiers ===
==== Premiership Table ====
	Seniors		
Club	Div 1	Div 2	Div 3
St Mary's	2	1	-
Bendigo	2	-	-
Diamond Creek Women's	2	-	-
VU Western Spurs	1	2	-
Montmorency	1	-	-
Lower Plenty	-	2	-
Eltham	-	1	-
Fitzroy Stars	-	1	-
West Preston Lakeside	-	1	-
Bundoora	-	-	1
Greensborough	-	-	1
Hurstbridge	-	-	1
Macleod	-	-	1
North Heidelberg	-	-	1
Panton Hill	-	-	1
Wallan	-	-	1
Total	8	8	7

==== Division 1 ====
NFL	Seniors	Captain	Coach
2025	Diamond Creek Women's	Maykaylah Appleby	Angelo Lamanna
2024	St Mary's	Elyssa Rees	Troy Bickerton
2023	Montmorency	Madeline Gallagher	Warren Harris
2022	Diamond Creek Women's	Stacey Cross	Collin Wallington
2020 Competition and 2021 Finals suspended due to COVID-19 pandemic
2019	VU Western Spurs	Jessica Francke; Tara Morgan	Christine Polatajko
2018	Bendigo	Andrea Walsh	Luis Alvarez-Harris
2017	Bendigo	Leah French	Cherie O'Neill

==== Division 2 ====
NFL	Seniors	Captain	Coach
2025	Lower Plenty	Molly McCormack	Stewart Lewis
2024	Lower Plenty	Molly McCormack	Stewart Lewis
2023	St Mary's	Elyssa Rees	Troy Bickerton
2022	Eltham	Jacki White	Darren Cardamone
2020 Competition and 2021 Finals suspended due to COVID-19 pandemic
2019	VU Western Spurs	Amy Unwin	John Mustafa
2018	West Preston Lakeside	Chloe Kalanj	Brett Pollard
2017	VU Western Spurs	B Muscat	Christine Polatajko

==== Division 3 ====
NFL	Seniors	Captain	Coach
2025	North Heidelberg	Teresa Cassar	Shannon Bevis
2024	Panton Hill	Jessica Dight	Ben Brown
2023	Wallan	Kelly Lennox	Leigh Senior
2022	Hurstbridge	Amy Graham	Paul Reid
2020 Competition and 2021 Finals suspended due to COVID-19 pandemic
2019	Greensborough	Kelly Mullins	Stewart Lewis
2018	Bundoora	Ashleigh Del Romano	Gary Moorcroft

=== Awards ===
==== Division 1 ====
	Best and Fairest		Leading Goal Kicker			Best on Ground in Grand Final	
Year	Player	Club	Player	Club	Goals	Player	Club
2025	Emmison Zealley	St Mary’s	Linda Thorp	Diamond Creek Women's	50	Maykaylah Appleby	Diamond Creek Women’s
2024	Maykaylah Appleby	Diamond Creek Women's	Linda Thorp	Diamond Creek Women's	27	Brigid McEntee	St Mary’s
2023	Maykaylah Appleby	Diamond Creek Women's	Linda Thorp	Diamond Creek Women's	29	Emily Beanland	Montmorency
2022	Ashleigh Snow	West Preston-Lakeside	Linda Thorp	Diamond Creek Women's	47	Stacey Cross	Diamond Creek Women's
2021	Shae Audley	Diamond Creek Women's	Linda Thorp	Diamond Creek Women's	33	2021 Finals suspended due to COVID-19 pandemic	
2020 Competition suspended due to COVID-19 pandemic
2019	Nicole Blyth	Montmorency	Kerrie Clarke	VU Western Spurs	21	Jessica Francke	VU Western Spurs
2018	Sarah Wright	Keilor	Andrea Walsh	Bendigo	58	Isabella Ayre	Bendigo
2017	Shannon Egan	Darebin	Andrea Walsh	Bendigo	50	Jacinta Louttit	Bendigo

==== Division 2 ====
	Best and Fairest		Leading Goal Kicker			Best on Ground in Grand Final	
Year	Player	Club	Player	Club	Goals	Player	Club
2025	Hailey Cordova	South Morang	Amina Keegan	Fitzroy Stars	30	Ava Klaic	Lower Plenty
2024	Molly Uwland	Ivanhoe	Georgia Pirdis	Ivanhoe	43	Shae Audley	Lower Plenty
2023	Gulia Ceravolo	Mernda	Megan Girolami	St Mary's	32	Jessica Hardy	St Mary's
2022	Jessica Hardy	St Mary's	Sarah Johnston	St Mary's	45	Angelique Reibelt	Eltham
2021	Maree Stephenson	Wallan	Rebecca Hayes	Hurstbridge	16	2021 Finals suspended due to COVID-19 pandemic	
2020 Competition suspended due to COVID-19 pandemic
2019	Demi Hallett	South Morang	Emma Rowe	Heidelberg	31	Danielle Mazzocca	VU Western Spurs
2018	Catherine O'Bryan	West Preston Lakeside	Samantha Greene	La Trobe Uni	39	Catherine O'Bryan	West Preston Lakeside
2017	Natarsha Bamblett; Nicole Blythe; Rechelle McSwain	West Preston Lakeside; Montmorency; South Morang	Nadine Rabah	VU Western Spurs	24	Nadine Lampard	VU Western Spurs

==== Division 3 ====
	Best and Fairest		Leading Goal Kicker			Best on Ground in Grand Final	
Year	Player	Club	Player	Club	Goals	Player	Club
2025	Remy Moore	North Heidelberg	Teresa Cassar	North Heidelberg	41	Remy Moore	North Heidelberg
2024	Hailey Cordova	South Morang	Bridie Groves	Panton Hill	25	Bianca Walker	Panton Hill
2023	Kelly Lennox	Wallan	Ashleigh Riley	Heidelberg West	16	Gloria El-Armaly	Wallan
2022	Gulia Ceravolo	Mernda	Ameerah Gentle	Mernda	24	Sheridan Bennett	Hurstbridge
2021	Natalie Todaro	Mernda	Rebekah Di Paola	Banyule	31	2021 Finals suspended due to COVID-19 pandemic	
2020 Competition suspended due to COVID-19 pandemic
2019	Belinda Harris	Hurstbridge	Stacy Rigon	VU Western Spurs	24	Ashleigh Ashman*	VU Western Spurs
2018	Rainbow Ebert	Bundoora	Amy Callaway	Bundoora	29	Krystal Cullinan*	Eltham

- Player awarded Best on Ground despite playing for the losing team

== Juniors Competition ==
The NFNL Juniors Competition has 24 clubs across the boys and girls competitions. The competition comprises age groups from under 9 thorough to under 17. In 2010 the league announced for there to be an under 16 age group which had previously not existed.

=== Lew Hall Trophy ===
The trophy is awarded each year to the club which has the most combined premiership points from the under 13, under 15 and under 17 age groups. The Lew Hall Award changed criteria to become an individual award to acknowledge club and community leadership by a young person.

Year	Club
2023	Zoe Paulo (Yarrambat)
2021	Taj Logan (Diamond Creek)
2019	Lynton Martin (Keon Park Stars)
2018	Max Larocia (Kilmore)
2017	Ruby Panozzo (Montmorency)
2007	Research
2006	Hurstbridge
2005	Preston RSL
2004	Epping
2003	Fawkner Park
2002	Mill Park
2001	Mill Park
2000	Yarrambat
1999	Whittlesea
1998	Eltham
1997	Keon Park Stars
1996	Greensborough
1995	Montmorency

=== Clubs ===
Club	Jumpers	Nickname	Home Ground	Entered Competition	Senior Affiliation
Darebin		Falcons	A.H. Capp Reserve, Preston	2011	Darebin
Diamond Creek		Creekers	Coventry Reserve, Diamond Creek	1922	Diamond Creek
Diamond Creek Women's		Creekers	Plenty War Memorial Oval, Plenty	2011	Diamond Creek
Donnybrook		Dragons	Cycad Park, Donnybrook	2022	None
Eltham		Panthers	Eltham Central Park, Susan Street Reserve, Eltham	1968	Eltham
Epping		Pingers	Epping Recreation Reserve, Epping		Epping
Greensborough		Raiders	Anthony Beale Reserve, Greensborough	1968	Greensborough
Hurstbridge		Bridges	Ben Frilay Memorial Oval, Hurstbridge		Hurstbridge
Kilmore		Blues	JJ Clancy Reserve, Kilmore	2017	Kilmore
Keon Park Stars		Stars	J C Donath Reserve, Reservoir	1993	Heidelberg West
Kinglake		Lakers	Kinglake Football Ground, Kinglake	2013	Kinglake (YVMDRL)
Laurimar		Power	Laurimar Reserve, Doreen	2011	Laurimar
Mernda		Demons	Waterview Recreation Reserve, Mernda		Mernda
Mill Park		Stallions, Parkers	Redleap Reserve, Mill Park	1981	Watsonia
Montmorency		Magpies	Montmorency Park, Montmorency	1968	Montmorency
Panton		Redbacks	Cracknell Reserve, Panton Hill	1997	Panton Hill
Research		Searchers	Research Park, Research	1987	Lower Plenty
South Morang		Lions	Mill Park Lakes Reserve, South Morang	1960	South Morang
Thomastown		Bears	Main Street Reserve, Thomastown	2023	Thomastown
Wallan		Magpies	Greenhill Reserve, Wallan	2002	Wallan
West Preston		Roosters	J E Moore Park, Preston		West Preston Lakeside
Whittlesea		Eagles	Whittlesea Showgrounds, Whittlesea		Whittlesea
Yarrambat		Bats	Yarrambat War Memorial Park, Yarrambat	1979	Hurstbridge

=== Junior Clubs Currently In Recess ===
Club	Jumpers	Nickname	Home Ground	Entered Competition	Senior Affiliation
West Ivanhoe		Roosters	Seddon Reserve, Ivanhoe	2013-2025	None

== Former clubs ==
=== Former Men's Competition Clubs ===
Club	Jumper	Nickname	Home Ground	Former League	Est.	Years in NFNL	NFNL Senior Premierships		Fate
Club	Jumper	Nickname	Home Ground	Former League	Est.	Years in NFNL	Total	Most recent	Fate
All Blacks		All Blacks	Unknown venue in Templestowe then Warringal Park, Heidelberg	–	1929	1929-1932	0	-	Amalgamated with Heidelberg after 1932 season
Diamond Valley Juniors			Coventry Oval, Diamond Creek	–	1939	1939-1941	0	-	Merger of Diamond Creek and Hurstbridge during WW2. De-merged following WW2
Fairfield Park		Bloods	Fairfield Park Oval, Fairfield	SFNL	1891	1996	0	-	Folded after 1996 season
Fawkner Park		Blues	Charles Mutton Reserve, Fawkner	WRFL	1998	1998, 2000-2006	0	-	Recess in 1999. Merged with North Coburg to form Northern Saints in Essendon District FL for the 2007 season
Kangaroo Ground			Kangaroo Ground Community Oval, Kangaroo Ground	BEFL	1893	1922-1928	0	-	Folded after 1928 season
Parkside		Devils	Pitcher Park, Alphington	VAFA	1934	2003-2013	1	2009	Returned to VAFA in 2014
Research		Bulldogs	Eltham Lower Park, Eltham	PHFL	1958	1986-1991	0	-	Folded after 1991 season
Reservoir-Lakeside		Lakies	LE Cotchin Reserve, Reservoir	–	1947	1947-1997	3	1977	Merged with West Preston to form West Preston Lakeside after 1997 season
St Andrews Coburg		Saints	De Chene Reserve, Coburg	VAFA	1986	1995-1996	0	-	Folded after 1996 season
Templestowe		Maroons or 'Stowers	Porter Street Reserve, Templestowe	HDFL, RDFA, ESFL	1892	1922-1926, 1931-1932, 1936-1937, 1947-1954, 1961-1990	2	1973	Played in Ringwood District FA between 1927-30 and 1933-35. Entered recess in 1938, re-formed in Eastern Suburban FL in 1946. Returned to ESFL in 1955. Moved to Eastern FNL after 1990 season
Thomastown (original)				BEFL	1919	1930-1931	0	-	Folded after 1931 season
Thornbury		Bears	John Cain Memorial Reserve, Thornbury	VAFA	1930s	1984-1986	0	-	Merged with Reservoir Rovers in 1987 to form Thornbury Rovers
Thornbury Rovers		Rovers	John Cain Memorial Reserve, Thornbury	–	1987	1987-1990	0	-	Folded in 1990
Wallan		Magpies	Wallan Recreation Reserve, Wallan	RDFNL	1904	2002-2007	0	-	Returned to Riddell District FNL in 2008
Warrandyte		Bloods	Warrandyte Reserve, Warrandyte	RDFA	1906	1922-1924, 1926	0	-	Played in Reporter District FA in 1925. Formed Ringwood District FA in 1927
West Preston		Roosters	JE Moore Park, Reservoir	YCWFL	1948	1981-1997	3	1996	Merged with Reservoir-Lakeside to form West Preston Lakeside after 1997 season

==== Additional Information ====
- All Blacks Football Club (Folded). A team from Templestowe, the 'All Blacks' were admitted into the Diamond Valley for the 1929 season. It is known that they wore an all-black uniform based upon two small news articles in 1929 where it was reported that the club had lent their strip to the Diamond Valley Football League representative side for their match against the Bourke-Evelyn League as part of the Hartley Shield inter-league competition. The All Blacks were a different team to the current Templestowe Football Club as they played against them in the 1931 and 1932 seasons. They moved to Warringal Park in Heidelberg during the 1930 season and were co-tenants with Old Paradians. They played their final season in 1932 and 'amalgamated' with Heidelberg Football Club in 1933 to play in the VFL Sub-District League.
- Diamond Valley Juniors was a merger between Diamond Creek and Hurstbridge football clubs in 1938 due to a lack of open aged players. The Diamond Valley Juniors played as a junior club only in the Melbourne Boys League in 1938. In 1939, enough senior players were available and they re-entered the DFVL until 1941. The team was dissolved when the DVFL resumed in 1946 with Diamond Creek and Hurstbridge Football Clubs becoming independent once more.
- Plenty Rovers Football Club (The Plenty Rovers FC came about because of a merger between the Mernda & Doreen, they played at the Doreen Recreation Reserve, from 1932 to 1964 (1936–1939, 1946 in the DVFL), until they were forced to move out of Doreen due to powerline extensions, and moved to Mernda Recreation Reserve in Schotters Rd, Mernda, where they changed their name back to the Mernda Football Club in 1965). When Mernda rejoined the DVFL, they changed their jumper from the red and blue Melbourne Football Club design to a red jumper with a blue sash (due to Diamond Creek already wearing the Melbourne Football Club jumper).
- Research Football Club (Club is now solely a junior club, however they do have an alignment with Lower Plenty Football Club). They wore a royal blue jumper with a red hoop and a white hoop either side of it in the style of Footscray Football Club when they played in the Panton Hill Football League but changed to a white jumper with red vertical stripes when they joined the Diamond Valley Football League (Due to North Heidelberg already wearing the bulldogs jumper). As a result of a number of violent on-field altercations, the club was expelled following the 1991 season. The Research Senior Football Club played at Eltham Lower Park, a different venue from the junior football club who still play at Research Park. They originally played on the northern ground closest to the miniature railway, but moved to the southern ground in the early 1980s when social rooms were built. Some details leading to the expulsion of the club from the DVFL, as well as coverage of the wider history of the club, can be found on the website of the Research Seniors Football Club. The website began in late 2025 and can be found here.
- St Andrews-Coburg Football Club (Folded) played in a gold jumper with a royal blue vee in the VAFA, but changed to a Royal blue and gold jumper, the same as the original West Coast Eagles jumper but without the eagle logo, when they crossed to the Diamond Valley Football League. St Andrews originally played at Brearley Reserve, Pascoe Vale South but with Coburg Amateurs Senior Football Club going into recess at the end of the 1987 season, St Andrews made the move to De Chene Reserve, Coburg in 1989. As a result of the move, St Andrews then merged with the Coburg Amateurs Junior Football Club to become St Andrews-Coburg.
- Thornbury began as Thornbury Presbyterian Football Club in the 1930s. They played in the CYMS Football League and then the VAFA, wearing the Footscray Bulldogs jumper. When transferring to the DVFL in 1984, they adopted a red jumper with blue stripes to avoid clashing with North Heidelberg Football Club.
- Thornbury Rovers folded after the 1990 season due to financial issues, as well as having 2 coaches and 21 senior players walk out of the club; according to The Sun newspaper in 1989, "Most weeks, the senior team is made up of players who have already played in the under-19s or reserves. On occasions, some juniors are asked to play three times on the one day". A picture accompanying this article displayed players wearing a red jumper with blue stripes, showing the Thornbury jumper was kept after the merger with Reservoir Rovers. The club was a merger between Thornbury (DVFL) and the Reservoir Rovers (Panton Hill Football League). The Reservoir Rovers also wore the Port Melbourne jumper and played at CT Barling Park in Reservoir.

=== Former Women's Competition Clubs ===
Club	Jumper in NFNL	Nickname	Home Ground	Former League	Founded	Years in NFNL	Fate
Bendigo		Thunder	Queen Elizabeth Oval, Bendigo	VWFL	2011	2017-2019	Transferred to Central Victoria FL in 2020
Deer Park		Lions	John McLeod Reserve, Deer Park	VWFL	1925	2017	Transferred to Western Region FL in 2018
Keilor		Blues	Keilor Recreation Reserve, Keilor	WREDWFL	1877	2018	Transferred to Essendon District FL in 2019
Kew		Bears	JJ Higgins Reserve, Kew	VWFL	1900	2017	Transferred to VAFA in 2018
La Trobe University		Trobers	Main Oval, La Trobe University, Bundoora	VWFL	1967	2017-2018	Transferred to VAFA in 2019
Melbourne University		MUGARS	Melbourne University Oval, Parkville	VWFL	1996	2017	Transferred to VAFA in 2018
Pascoe Vale		Panthers	Raeburn Reserve, Pascoe Vale	VWFL	1909	2017	Transferred to Essendon District FL in 2018
Wallan		Magpies	Greenhill Reserve, Wallan	–	1904	2019-2026	Transferred to Riddell District FL in 2027
VU Western Spurs		Spurs	Henry Turner Reserve, Footscray	VWFL	1993	2017-2022	Transferred to Western Region FL in 2023
Whitehorse Colts		Colts	Springfield Park, Box Hill	VWFL	1954	2017-2018	Transferred to Eastern FNL in 2019

=== Former Junior Competition Clubs ===
Club	Jumper in NFNL	Nickname	Home Ground	Founded	Years in NFNL	Fate
Bundoora Park		Thunderbolts	Bundoora Park Oval, Bundoora	2011	2011-2022	Folded after 2022 season
Coburg Amateurs		Swans	De Chene Reserve, Coburg		1994-1999	Merged with Newlands Coburg to form Coburg Juniors in 2000
Coburg Juniors		Cougars	De Chene Reserve, Coburg	2000	2000-2004	Placed on 12 month suspension for the 2005 season due to poor behaviour by DVFL. Club did not reform and folded.
Holy Child		Cats	Gibb Reserve, Dallas		1996-2000	Folded
Jacana		Jaguars	Jacana Reserve, Jacana	1961	2011	Female Team Only; joined their Male Teams in Essendon District FL in 2012
Kingsbury RSL		Kangaroos	John Hall Reserve, Kingsbury		1996-2004	Folded
Lalor Stars		Stars	WA Smith Reserve, Lalor		1994-2013	Folded
Newlands Coburg		Cobras	Jackson Reserve, Coburg North	1966	1996-1999	Merged with Coburg Amateurs to form Coburg Juniors in 2000
Northcote (Formerly Alphington)		Cougars	Mcdonnell Park, Northcote	1962	?-2019	Moved to Yarra Junior FL in 2020
Preston RSL			W Ruthven VC Reserve, Preston		1986-2010	Folded
Reservoir		Colts	Crispe Park, Reservoir		?-2023	Folded
St Damian's		Saints	Binnak Park, Bundoora	1979	2011	Female Team Only; joined their Male Teams in Yarra Junior FL in 2012
West Lalor		Dragons	Huskisson Recreation Reserve, Lalor	1973	1987-2013	Folded

== Footnote ==
Halfway through the 2009 season, six clubs (including Parkside and Hurstbridge) split from Division 2 in preparation for a third division in 2010. These clubs competed against each other for the rest of the season and Parkside defeated Hurstbridge in the senior grand final with Hurstbridge winning the reserve grand final. As per the announcement of the league at the time the divisions were split, Parkside were not promoted to Division Two.
