= John Carmody =

John Carmody may refer to:

- John Carmody (footballer), Australian rules footballer
- John M. Carmody, American administrator
- John Carmody (judge), North Dakota judge

== See also ==
- Jack Carmody, Australian rules footballer
