= Phil Ryan (footballer, born 1925) =

Australian rules footballer

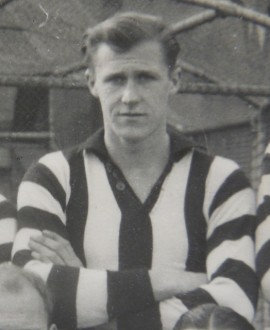
- Ryan during his Collingwood career

Personal information
- Full name: Phillip George Ryan jnr.
- Born: 15 January 1925; Melbourne, Victoria
- Died: 1 July 1982 (aged 57); Heidelberg, Victoria
- Original team: Preston Churches
- Height: 189 cm (6 ft 2 in)
- Weight: 89 kg (196 lb)

Playing career^{1}
Years	Club	Games (Goals)
1942–1947	Collingwood	74 (48)
- ^{1} Playing statistics correct to the end of 1947.

Phillip George Ryan (15 Jan 1925 – 1 July 1982) was an Australian rules footballer who played with Collingwood in the Victorian Football League (VFL).

A Preston Churches recruit, Ryan was just 17 when he made his league debut in 1942. He played as a ruckman and forward, in 74 VFL games for Collingwood, including five finals, two of which were close preliminary final losses. During the 1945 VFL season, in a win over Hawthorn at Glenferrie Oval, Ryan kicked a career best six goals.

Ryan captain-coached Montmorency to a premiership in 1951, the club's first since joining the Diamond Valley Football League. They defeated Epping in the grand final, by 96 points. In 1954 he was non playing coach of another Montmorency premiership team.
