= Panton Hill Football Club =

Panton Hill Football Netball Club

Names
- Full name: Panton Hill Football Netball Club
- Nickname(s): The Redbacks, Hillers

2022 season
- After finals: 8th
- Best and fairest: Sam Parks

Club details
- Founded: 1926
- Colours: Red and Black
- Competition: Northern Football Netball League
- President: Jayson Burleigh
- Coach: Simon Amore
- Captain(s): John Pritchard & Sam Parks
- Ground: A.E Cracknell Reserve Panton Hill

Other information
- Official website: pantonhillfc.com.au

Panton Hill Football Club is an Australian rules football club in Panton Hill, Victoria, currently competing in the Northern Football League.

== History ==
The club was founded in 1926, and affiliated with the Bourke - Evelyn Football League. The club originally wore a maroon jumper with a white Vee.

In 1929 and 1930, they played in the Diamond Valley Football League.

The club first premiership was in 1934 against Yarra Glen who were undefeated until the Grand Final.

The club only played the 1938 season and part of 1939 and was in recess for the remainder of the period.

The club re-emerged in 1947 in the newly formed seven member club Panton Hill Football League, Panton Hill, Wallan East, Plenty Rovers, Hurstbridge, Kinglake, Whittlesea and St Andrews.

Panton Hill wore a different designed jumper navy blue with a red yoke, but again changed to black with red sash as the other design was difficult to come by.

The only senior premiership in the Panton Hill Football League was in 1955 but the juniors won back to back in 1964 - 1965 and more recently, after 42 years the juniors won the 2007 premiership.

After a stellar season in 1970 under first year coach Peter Ferne, the club was runner up to Hurstbridge. The only League Best and Fairest award won by a Panton Hill player was won by Mick Bowman in 1969.

The only players to kick 100 goals for the club in one season are Mick Carns (In 1960) and Errol Loeffler. Juniors to win a league best and fairest are Jack Sullivan, Barry Sullivan and Garry Skinner in the 60s and Joe Jach and Peter Hoppe in the 70s.

1987 proved to be a bitter-sweet year for the club after struggling early for numbers, the arrival of Gavin Ward saw the influx of a number of new players and by season's end, Panton Hill not only made the finals but under Captain/Coach, John Stanley recorded a memorable come-from-behind win against Hurstbridge in the first semi final. Although beaten in the preliminary final against Coolaroo the good finish to the season looked set to be the catalyst of better things to come. Unfortunately with the departure of several Clubs and some struggling to survive, the Panton Hill Football League went into recess. The next year the League was formerly dissolved.

In 1988 the Yarra Valley Mountain District Football League gave Panton Hill a lifeline. With Dennis Kerr as Senior Coach, the Club struggled again to attract players due to travel and the highly competitive nature of the League. While wins were few and far between in the early stages, the Club quickly gained a reputation for their "never say die" attitude and fierce determination.

In 1990 with former player and coach, Tony Cahir as president, former Seville Premiership player and coach Fritz Eigner, took over as Playing Senior Coach and brought a renewed enthusiasm and professionalism to the club.

In 1992 the Club enjoyed one of its most successful seasons in over 20 years with both the Senior and Reserves teams both making the finals. Unfortunately both sides went down in the first semi final.

After the success of 1992 better things were expected but once again the Club went on a roller coaster ride and continued to struggle to recruit quality players.

In 1995 the ground was finally improved with the club forced to play at Yarrambat. With one of the wettest winters in years and nowhere to train the seniors recorded just one win.

During 1996, the club entered into discussions with the Diamond Valley Football League in regards to joining the proposed new third division. While the Diamond Valley clubs voted against a third division, the League was so impressed with Panton Hill's submission, the club was offered a position in second division for 1997.

The club has largely struggled in the DVFL, wins being at a premium. However, Panton Hill was able to reach the finals for the first time in 2004. The club defeated perennial Diamond Valley power Greensborough in one of the biggest upsets in football history. The win was largely due to 22 marks from journeyman forward Tim Borchers. The club bowed out the next week after George Le Broq medallist and man about town William Box withdrew due to injury, the team shattered about the loss of their beloved roaming backman.

The newly formed Panton Hill Junior Football Club won the Under 10's Premiership in 2007.

Since 2010, Panton Hill have been a strong presence in the Northern Football League's newly founded Division 3. They have appeared in each finals series and recently, reached the 2012 Division 3 Senior Grand Final where they faced a fast-paced Mernda outfit who ran out winners by 92 points. Key forward Jonathon "Joffa" Byron, who earlier in the season had topped 100 goals, struggled to influence the club's big day.

2011 Saw the reserves team win the NFNL Premiership.

Under Coach Dean Haydock and Captain Will Box, Panton Hill won the NFL Third Division Premiership in 2013 with a thrilling one-point victory over Watsonia, 13.9.87 to 13.8.86, a year in which the club recruited several players with Division 1 experience. It was a tightly contested game throughout and with Panton Hill reaching a game high 19 point lead 14 minutes into the last term, the game looked won. Somehow, Watsonia booted four goals in quick succession and had a 5-point lead with 3 minutes remaining and a classic choke loomed for the minor premiers. However, a kick to the forward pocket found Jarrod McGough who slotted an outstanding set shot goal from 40m on a tight angle. The last nail was then driven into Watsonia's coffin as Zach Williams marked at the top of the goal square and nailed home Panton Hill's first premiership since 1955. There was a monster sized party at the Clubrooms afterwards celebrating the club's first Senior Premiership in 58 years.

The Redbacks again tasted Premiership victory in 2019 by winning Division 3 over South Morang. The 'Hillers dominated the season and were red-hot favourites after setting a goal after losing the previous years Grand Final. Under Coach Stephen Layt the boys completed a two-year plan by holding the cup aloft. Daniel Freeman was voted best on the ground in the wet conditions at Whittlesea Showgrounds. Coach Layt stepped down following the game, and Simon Amore was appointed Coach from 2020 onwards. Simon played in the 2013 Premiership before leaving the club for Coaching experience. Amore's first season, 2020, was cancelled due to COVID-19, however he led the club until late 2025 (cementing the club in 2nd Division) when he handed the reins to Deanna Berry, making Panton Hill the first club in Australia to appoint a current AFLW player as Senior Men's Coach. Deanna was Captain of the Western Bulldogs, and had been the Redbacks Asst. Men's Coach since 2021. Micheal Farrelly was appointed Senior Coach at the beginning of the 2026 season.
