= Mark Perkins (footballer) =

Australian rules footballer and coach

Personal information
- Full name: Mark Perkins
- Born: 23 May 1964 (age 62)
- Original team: Heidelberg West
- Height: 179 cm (5 ft 10 in)
- Weight: 69 kg (152 lb)
- Position: Rover

Playing career^{1}
Years	Club	Games (Goals)
1987, 1989	Collingwood	8 (12)
- ^{1} Playing statistics correct to the end of 1989.

Mark Perkins (born 23 May 1964) is a former Australian rules footballer who played with Collingwood in the Victorian Football League (VFL).

Perkins made his way into the Collingwood team on the back of his Frank Smith Medal winning season for Heidelberg West in the 1986 Diamond Valley Football League season. A rover, he played in the final six rounds of the 1987 VFL season. He had 14 disposals and two goals on his debut, against Richmond at the Melbourne Cricket Ground and also kicked four goals in a loss St Kilda. After not featuring at all in 1988, Perkins returned to the side for the first game of the season in 1989 but it would be his penultimate appearance.

He returned to the Diamond Valley Football League in the 1990s and captain-coached North Heidelberg to a premiership in 1994.

Perkins coached Beechworth in the Ovens & King Football League in 1998 and 1999.
