= Joe Murphy (Australian footballer) =

Australian rules footballer

Personal information
- Full name: Joe Murphy
- Born: 25 December 1931
- Died: 7 June 1985 (aged 53)
- Original team: Princes Hill
- Height: 188 cm (6 ft 2 in)
- Weight: 85 kg (187 lb)

Playing career^{1}
Years	Club	Games (Goals)
1952–1953	Fitzroy	11 (0)
- ^{1} Playing statistics correct to the end of 1953.

Joe Murphy (25 December 1931 – 7 June 1985) was an Australian rules footballer who played with Fitzroy in the Victorian Football League (VFL).

Murphy was from Princes Hill originally and played for the Carlton thirds before arriving at Fitzroy. He played three games for Fitzroy in 1952, including a semi final, followed by eight appearances in the 1953 VFL season.

Having left Fitzroy, Murphy made his way to the Diamond Valley Football League (DVFL) in 1954 and joined Greensborough. He shared the league's best and fairest award that year with Doug King of Reservoir-Lakeside.

Murphy captain-coached Tasmanian North West Football Union club Latrobe from 1955 until 1958 and was an interstate representative for the island at both the 1956 Perth and 1958 Melbourne Carnivals.

He resumed his DVFL career in 1959, back at Greensborough, which he captain-coached to premierships in 1960 and 1961. In the latter of those seasons he was again voted the league's "best and fairest" player.
