= Kevin Grose =

Australian rules footballer

Personal information
- Born: 18 June 1954
- Died: 27 November 2012 (aged 58)
- Original team: Reservoir Old Boys
- Height: 180 cm (5 ft 11 in)
- Weight: 80 kg (176 lb)

Playing career^{1}
Years	Club	Games (Goals)
1975–1977	Collingwood	32 (10)
- ^{1} Playing statistics correct to the end of 1977.

Kevin Grose (18 June 1954 – 27 November 2012) was an Australian rules footballer who played with Collingwood in the Victorian Football League (VFL).

A Reservoir Old Boy, Grose played as a half back flanker for Collingwood over three league seasons. He played 12 games in 1975 and a further 15 in the 1976 VFL season. By 1977 he was only a fringe player, with Collingwood building a side which would contest that year's grand final.

Grose was then appointed captain-coach of Diamond Valley Football League club North Heidelberg in 1978. He promptly steered them a premiership in his first season in charge, their first flag in 16 years. In 1978 he also was the league's equal leading goal-kicker on 80 goals.
