= Russell Dickson (footballer, born 1964) =

Australian rules footballer

Personal information
- Full name: Russell K. Dickson
- Born: 28 January 1964 (age 62)
- Original team: Greensborough
- Height: 175 cm (5 ft 9 in)
- Weight: 70 kg (154 lb)

Playing career^{1}
Years	Club	Games (Goals)
1985–1987	Collingwood	20 (18)
- ^{1} Playing statistics correct to the end of 1987.

Russell Dickson (born 28 January 1964) is a former Australian rules footballer who played with Collingwood in the Victorian Football League (VFL).

Dickson, a Greensborough recruit, kicked four goals on debut for Collingwood, against North Melbourne at the Melbourne Cricket Ground in the opening round of the 1985 VFL season. It was the first ever Victorian Football League game to be played under lights at the MCG. He played a further ten games that year, six in 1986 and three in 1987.

From 2005 to 2007, Dickson was senior coach of Greensborough. He coached them to the 2006 DVFL Division II premiership.
