= Kevin Hart (disambiguation) =

Kevin Hart (born 1979) is an American actor and comedian.

Kevin Hart may also refer to:

- Kevin Hart (baseball) (born 1982), American baseball player
- Kevin Hart (footballer) (1927–2016), Australian rules footballer
- Kevin Hart (poet) (born 1954), Australian poet and critic
- Pro Hart (Kevin Charles Hart, 1928–2006), Australian painter
