= Bernie Drury =

Australian rules footballer

Personal information
- Full name: Bernie Drury
- Born: 10 June 1948 (age 78)
- Original team: Montmorency
- Height: 180 cm (5 ft 11 in)
- Weight: 84 kg (185 lb)

Playing career^{1}
Years	Club	Games (Goals)
1966	Fitzroy	6 (0)
- ^{1} Playing statistics correct to the end of 1966.

Bernie Drury (born 10 June 1948) is a former Australian rules footballer who played with Fitzroy in the Victorian Football League (VFL).

== Career ==
Drury made six senior appearances for Fitzroy in the 1966 VFL season, all in losses.

In 1967, he returned to his original club, Montmorency. Playing as a full-forward, he topped the Diamond Valley Football League goal-kicking that year with 69 goals.
