= Shane Harvey =

Australian rules footballer

Personal information
- Born: 3 January 1983 (age 43)
- Original team: Northern Knights (TAC Cup)
- Debut: 4 May 2002, Essendon vs. Fremantle, at Subiaco Oval
- Height: 176 cm (5 ft 9 in)
- Weight: 75 kg (165 lb)

Playing career^{1}
Years	Club	Games (Goals)
2002–2003	Essendon	11 (9)
2004	Kangaroos	3 (4)
Total		14 (13)
- ^{1} Playing statistics correct to the end of 2004.

Shane Harvey (born 1983) is a former Australian rules footballer.

== Career ==
He was drafted by the Essendon Football Club in the 2001 AFL draft at pick 18 in the first round from the Northern Knights. He played 11 games with Essendon before being delisted after the 2003 season.

The Kangaroos picked him at pick 6 of the 2004 Pre-Season Draft after they had promised his brother Brent Harvey that they would select Shane if he was available. He played 3 games for the Kangaroos and finished his AFL career at the end of the 2004 season.

He has since played for country and suburban clubs, including Wakool Football Club in the Golden Rivers Football League, in which he helped Wakool win the premiership in 2006, and then North Heidelberg Football Club in 2008 and 2009. He played for Barooga in the Murray Football League in 2010.

Shane has the ability to kick a lot of goals in the local competitions. He kicked 116 goals for Wakool in 2006 and 107 in 2007, scored 108 goals for North Heidelberg in 2008 and 102 in 2009, and scored 102 goals at Barooga in 2010.

His Junior club was Preston R.S.L. Football Club.

Playing for North Heidelberg against Hurstbridge in 2021, he scored his 1000th Northern Football League goal, becoming the first player to do so.
