= Fred Anderson (footballer, born 1931) =

Australian rules footballer

Personal information
- Full name: Fred Anderson
- Born: 9 June 1931 (age 91)
- Original team: Ivanhoe Amateurs
- Height: 173 cm (5 ft 8 in)
- Weight: 67 kg (148 lb)

Playing career^{1}
Years	Club	Games (Goals)
1951–1953	Fitzroy	20 (3)
- ^{1} Playing statistics correct to the end of 1953.

Fred Anderson (born 9 June 1931) is a former Australian rules footballer who played with Fitzroy in the Victorian Football League (VFL).

Anderson, a rover from Ivanhoe Amateurs, played three seasons for Fitzroy.

From Fitzroy, he made his way to Hawthorn but would not play a senior league game for his new club.

He was cleared to Greensborough in 1955 and captain-coached them to that season's Diamond Valley Football League premiership.
