= Lower Plenty Football Club =

Names
- Full name: Lower Plenty Football Club
- Nickname(s): The Bears, Lower

2018 season
- After finals: 1st
- Leading goalkicker: Tom Keys (37)
- Best and fairest: Jordan Sacco

Club details
- Founded: 1961
- Colours: Maroon, White and Yellow
- Competition: Northern Football League
- Chairperson: Michael Maloney
- Coach: Travis Stephens
- Ground: Montmorency Park Upper Oval

Other information
- Official website: lowerplentyfc.com.au

Lower Plenty is an Australian rules football club in Montmorency, Victoria, currently competing in the Northern Football League.

== History ==
The Lower Plenty Football Club located 18 km north-east of Melbourne in the suburb of Montmorency. The club's home ground is the upper oval at Para Road Reserve, adjacent to the Montmorency Football Club home ground.

The club wore a brown and gold vertical striped guernsey and were known as the Hawks before changing to a gold and maroon guernsey and becoming the Bears due to a clash with existing Second Division Club Heidelberg West.

Founded in 1961 as the Diamond Valley Churches Football Club the club was affiliated with the Metropolitan Churches League. When the league folded in 1970, the club became Diamond Valley United and joined the Eastern Suburban Churches Football Association.

In 1983, the club transferred to the Panton Hill Football League before returning to the ESCFA in 1986

The club played seasons 1993 & 1994 in the Southern Football League before settling into the Second Division of the Diamond Valley Football League in 1995. With ex-AFL player Brad Plain joining them after being delisted by North-Melbourne.

Winning the 1999 Second Division premiership the club was promoted to First Division, where the club survived for a few seasons before falling back to Second Division.

In the 2010 Northern Football League Second Division Grand Final played at Preston City Oval on 11 September the club was beaten by Whittlesea 9.3.57 to 9.17.71.

In the 2011 Northern Football League Second Division Grand Final played at Preston City Oval on 17 September the club defeated Epping 12.14.86 to 4.10.34 and promotion to the Northern Football League First Division in 2012.

In 2012, Lower Plenty competed in Division One for the first time since 2005. They lost around half of their 2011 Premiership players and were tipped to finish last and be relegated back to Division Two. In the final round of the 2012 season, Lower Plenty sat on the bottom of the ladder. They played Whittlesea, who were second bottom, and needed to win by 29 points or more to make up the 3% needed to finish 9th on the ladder. They won by 37 points, thus securing a spot in Division One for 2013 while condemning Whittlesea to Division Two.

In 2018 Lower Plenty beat Eltham after the siren in the grand final to earn promotion from Division 2. In 2019 they will again compete in Division 1.

== Premierships ==
=== Northern Football League (Formerly Diamond Valley Football League) ===
==== Seniors ====
- Second Division: 1999, 2011, 2018

==== Reserves ====
- Second Division: 2011

==== Thirds ====
- Second Division: 1997, 1999, 2011

=== Eastern Suburban Churches Football League ===
==== Seniors ====
- 1986

== Jumper ==
The club originally wore Brown and Gold vertical stripes but changed to Maroon and Gold due to a clash with Heidelberg West. After changing the jumper again to be more like the Brisbane Bears (who hadn't merged yet), the club decided to wear a Maroon strip with a White outlined, Yellow V. In 2002 the club changed the jumper again to a custom strip with a Gold top and Maroon bottom separated by a Navy and White bear outline. In 2009 the club changed back to the previous Brisbane Bears jumper to be the same as their alignment club Research Junior Football Club
