= Jake King =

Australian rules footballer (born 1984)

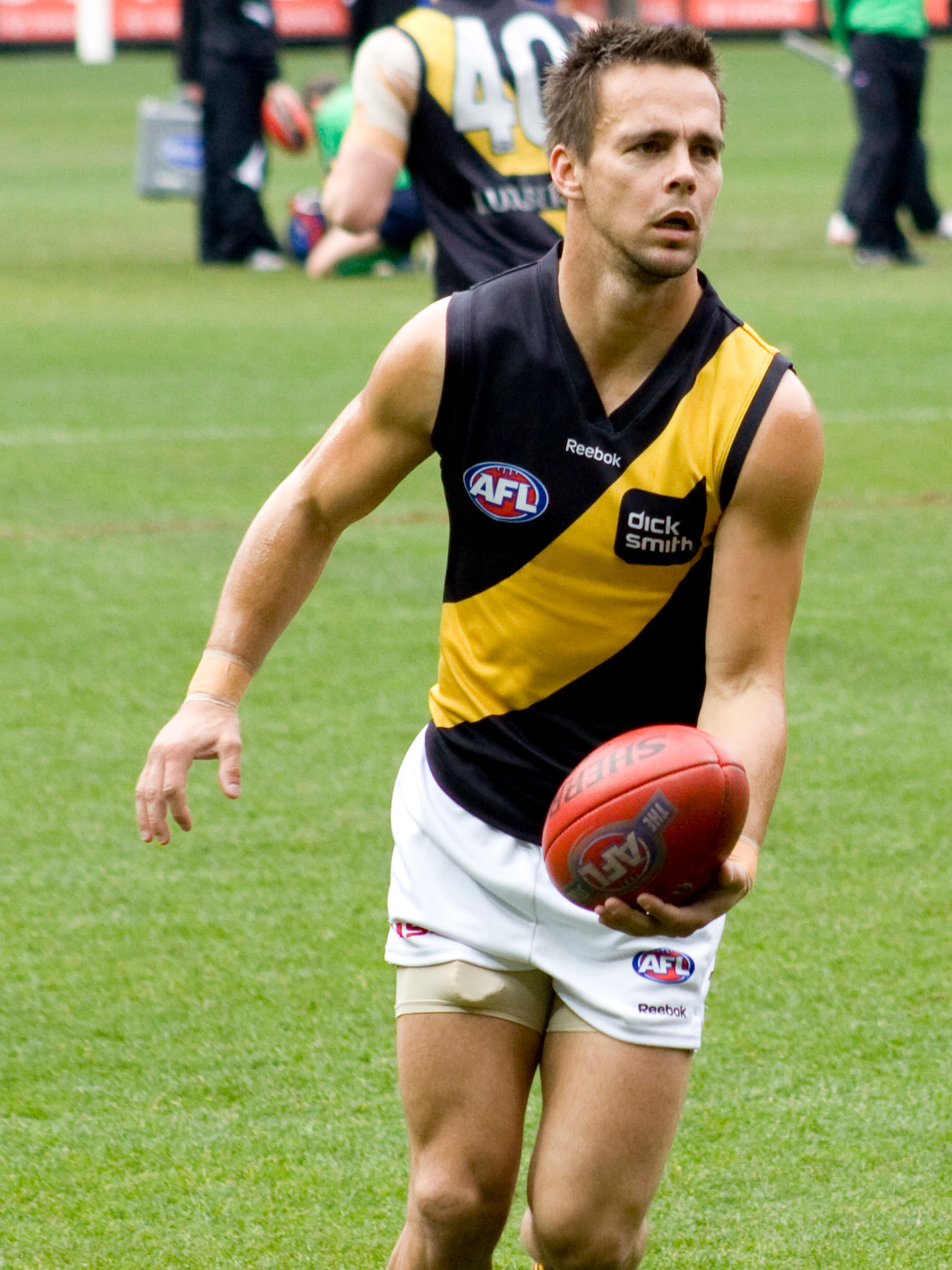
- King in August 2009

Personal information
- Full name: Jake King
- Nicknames: Kingy, The Push-Up, The Ball SmasherKing
- Born: 26 March 1984 (age 42); Victoria
- Original team: North Heidelberg / Coburg Tigers
- Draft: 24th overall, 2006 Rookie draft Richmond
- Height: 178 cm (5 ft 10 in)
- Weight: 82 kg (181 lb)
- Position: Back pocket/half forward flank

Playing career^{1}
| Years | Club | Games (Goals) |
| 2007–2014 | Richmond | 107 (79) |
- ^{1} Playing statistics correct to the end of 2014.

Jake King (born 26 March 1984) is a former Australian rules footballer for the Richmond Football Club in the Australian Football League (AFL).

== Career ==
King previously played for North Heidelberg in the Diamond Valley Football League before moving to the Coburg Tigers in the VFL. He was a co-winner of Coburg's best and fairest award in 2006 before being selected by Richmond onto their rookie list with the 25th selection in the 2007 Rookie draft. He was temporarily elevated to their senior list in May 2007 along with Cameron Howat when Mark Coughlan and Carl Peterson were placed on the long-term injury list. After playing every game since his debut round 4 in the 2007 AFL season, he was promoted to the Richmond Tiger's senior list for the 2008 season.

King was a small, explosive forward who is recognised for his toughness and pace around the ball. His speed was fully displayed at the 2007 AFL Grand Final Sprint, which he won. When interviewed he expressed his surprise in the post race interviews by saying "I thought [Port Adelaide's Nathan] Krakouer would shit it in".

In May 2009, King was implicated as being one of a group of players including Kane Johnson and Chris Newman to have asked Terry Wallace to step down as Richmond coach. This came as quite a shock to most of the public seeing that King isn't a regular senior player. King later denied that he was involved in any discussions concerning Wallace's future at the club.

In the 2011 pre-season King captained Richmond for two matches, against Carlton and Collingwood.

On 28 July 2014, King announced his retirement from AFL.

On 5 July 2017, he and former team-mate Tyrone Vickery were arrested and questioned over extortion claims, with King being charged with offences including making threats to kill. He was placed on a 12-month good-behaviour bond and ordered to donate $5,000 to charity.
