= Russell Jessop =

Australian rules footballer

Personal information
- Full name: Russell Jessop
- Born: 25 September 1957
- Died: 16 May 2018 (aged 60)
- Original team: Thornbury
- Height: 180 cm (5 ft 11 in)
- Weight: 79 kg (174 lb)

Playing career^{1}
| Years | Club | Games (Goals) |
| 1976–1977 | Collingwood | 5 (0) |
- ^{1} Playing statistics correct to the end of 1977.

Russell Jessop (25 September 1957 – 16 May 2018) was an Australian rules footballer who played with Collingwood in the Victorian Football League (VFL).

Jessop got his first chance to play for Collingwood when the club made five changes to their team to take on Footscray in round 20 of the 1976 VFL season, having fallen to the bottom of the ladders after their loss to Fitzroy. Used as a wingman or flanker, he appeared in the remaining two fixtures that year and another two in 1977.

He later had success at Lalor as a forward and topped the Diamond Valley Football League goal-kicking in 1984 with 103 goals. Jessop died in May 2018.
