= Stuart Glascott =

Australian rules footballer

Personal information
- Full name: Stuart Glascott
- Born: 6 June 1965 (age 61)
- Original team: Lalor / Moomba Park / Thomastown via University HS
- Height: 185 cm (6 ft 1 in)
- Weight: 70 kg (154 lb)

Playing career^{1}
| Years | Club | Games (Goals) |
| 1987 | Brisbane Bears | 4 (0) |
- ^{1} Playing statistics correct to the end of 1987.

Stuart Glascott (born 6 June 1965), the younger brother of Carlton premiership winner David, is a former Australian rules footballer who played with the Brisbane Bears in the Victorian Football League (VFL).

Stuart Glascott was originally recruited from Lalor / Moomba Park / Thomastown via University HS.

Stuart Glascott played with Carlton U/19's and Reserves team from 1983 through to 1985. Stuart then headed up north to play in the QAFL where he would eventually join the Brisbane Bears.

Stuart Glascott appeared in the final four rounds of the 1987 VFL season.
