= Jason Heatley =

Australian rules footballer, born 1972

Personal information
- Born: 21 February 1972 (age 54); Reservoir, Victoria
- Original team: North Heidelberg (DVFL)
- Debut: Round 10, 4 June 1995, West Coast vs. Brisbane Bears, at Subiaco Oval
- Height: 189 cm (6 ft 2 in)
- Weight: 92 kg (203 lb)

Playing career^{1}
Years	Club	Games (Goals)
1993–1996	Subiaco (WAFL)	73 (370)
1995–1996	West Coast	3 (8)
1997–2000	St Kilda	60 (163)
2002-2003	Tasmanian Devils (VFL)	28 (91)
1993	Western Australia	2 (5)
Total		166 (637)
- ^{1} Playing statistics correct to the end of 2000.

Career highlights
- DVFL leading goalkicker: 1992, 2001; WAFL leading goalkicker: 1993, 1995; Subiaco leading goalkicker: 1993, 1994, 1995, 1996; St Kilda leading goalkicker: 1997, 1998

Jason Heatley (born 21 February 1972) is a former Australian rules football full-forward, who played for Subiaco and St Kilda during the 1990s.

== Early career ==
Heatley played with the Wangaratta Football Club in the Ovens & Murray Football League in 1991 and kicked 25 goals, then played with North Heidelberg in the Diamond Valley Football League in Victoria in 1992 and kicked 118 goals.

Heatley was zoned to Fitzroy who rejected him as too slight for full-forward after playing six practice matches before the 1993 season, during three of which he was stationed at full-back. Consequently, he was recruited by Subiaco, where he kicked 111 goals in 1993, winning the Bernie Naylor Medal and kicking the highest aggregate of goals since Warren Ralph kicked 128 in 1983.

Heatley caught the attention of AFL recruiters, and was picked up in the 1993 AFL draft by the West Coast Eagles, but the same fears that derailed him from signing with Fitzroy prevented him breaking into the strong Eagles team. After three seasons on the list for just three games, Heatley was delisted at the end of 1996. Heatley continued nonetheless to kick goals for Subiaco: 81 in 1994, 123 in 1995 (winning his second Bernie Naylor Medal) and 55 in 1996.

== St Kilda career ==
St Kilda picked Heatley up in the 1996 AFL draft, and he debuted for the Saints in 1997. Heatley kicked 73 goals in 1997, and he was known for his set-shot accuracy in front of goal. He led St Kilda’s goalkicking and became a vital part of a St Kilda team. In his first game for St Kilda, he kicked 5 goals against Collingwood in Round 3. Heatley also kicked a personal best of 9 goals and 1 behind that year in Round 14 where St Kilda won by 9 goals against North Melbourne at Waverley Park.

Heatley played in 17 of 22 matches in the 1997 AFL Premiership Season home-and-away rounds in which St Kilda qualified in first position for the 1997 AFL Finals Series, winning the club’s second minor premiership and first McClelland Trophy.

Heatley played in the 1997 AFL Grand Final in which St Kilda was defeated by 31 points. He was the third-highest goalkicker in the AFL that year, behind Tony Modra and Saverio Rocca.

In 1998, Heatley had an average year; the inconsistency of the team reflected his performances. However, he still won the Saints’ goalkicking, albeit with only 48 goals for the year.

In 1999 and 2000, Heatley's AFL career started a downward spiral. He managed only thirteen games in 1999 for a return of 27 goals, and in 2000 he played seven games for only fifteen goals, after which St. Kilda, trying to rebuild after a disastrous season with only two wins under general expectation of at least a finals berth, delisted him.

== Post-AFL career ==
Heatley returned to North Heidelberg in 2001 and won the Diamond Valley goalkicking award by kicking 110 goals.

Heatley had a two-year stint with the Tasmania Devils in the VFL before coaching Warrnambool in the Hampden Football League and won the 2004 Hampden Football League goalkicking award.

Heatley returned to Melbourne and coached Northcote Park Cougars in the Northern Football League. Heatley coached the Cougars for three seasons: 2012 (Premiers), 2013, and 2014. In 2012, Heatley was awarded the ACFA coach of the Northern Region. Heatley coached North Heidelberg from 2021 to 2024.

In September, 2024, Heatley was appointed as non playing coach of the Wangaratta Football Club in the Ovens & Murray Football League for seasons 2025 and 2026, who he played football with in 1991.
