= Dennis Le Gassick =

Australian rules footballer

Personal information
- Full name: Dennis Le Gassick
- Born: 12 March 1947 (age 79)
- Height: 185 cm (6 ft 1 in)
- Weight: 80 kg (176 lb)

Playing career^{1}
Years	Club	Games (Goals)
1968–1969	Collingwood	8 (0)
- Preston
- Reservoir-Lakeside
1978-80	Sorrento	57 (unknown)
- ^{1} Playing statistics correct to the end of 1969.

Career highlights
- 1975, 1977 premiership captain, 1979-80 premiership playing coach

Dennis Le Gassick (born 12 March 1947) is a former Australian rules footballer who played with Collingwood in the Victorian Football League (VFL).

Le Gassick made six appearances for Collingwood in the 1968 VFL season and another two in 1969. He remained at the club in 1970 but didn't record a senior game, after finishing his stint in league football Le Gassick ended up joining Preston of the Victorian Football Association.

Le Gassick later had considerable success in local competitions, while captain of Reservoir-Lakeside in the Diamond Valley Football League he saluted with premierships in 1975 and 1977. Back-to-back premierships followed as playing coach of Sorrento in the Mornington Peninsula Nepean Football League in 1979 and 1980.

Le Gassick now works in the Gold Coast real estate industry, having moved to Queensland in the 1980s. He had been influential in the local basketball scene and was a board member of the Gold Coast Rollers, who competed in the National Basketball League.
