= Robert Hyde (footballer) =

Australian rules footballer (born 1954)

Personal information
- Full name: Robert Hyde
- Born: 1 November 1954 (age 72)
- Original team: Greensborough
- Height: 183 cm (6 ft 0 in)
- Weight: 85 kg (187 lb)

Playing career^{1}
Years	Club	Games (Goals)
1973–1978	Collingwood	62 (2)
1979	Essendon	1 (0)
Total		63 (2)
- ^{1} Playing statistics correct to the end of 1979.

Career highlights
- 1976 Copeland Trophy

Robert Hyde (born 1 November 1954) is a former Australian rules footballer who played with the Collingwood and Essendon football teams in the Victorian Football League (VFL) during the 1970s.

== Playing career ==
Hyde played 63 senior VFL football games between 1973 and 1979. A defender, Hyde won the Copeland Trophy in 1976 for Collingwood's best and fairest player. Hyde played for Collingwood in both the drawn 1977 VFL Grand Final and the Grand Final replay the following week. He finished his career with Essendon.

== Coaching career ==
Hyde coached Greensborough to Diamond Valley Football League premierships in 1983 and 1984, and then spent time coaching North Old Boys in the Victorian Amateur Football Association. He was coach of the Calder Cannons in the TAC Cup from 1996 to 2006, during which time he led the Cannons to five grand finals, winning three premierships After leaving Calder, he coached the Victorian Country team in the AFL Under 18 Championships. Hyde was appointed as senior coach of the Northern Blues in the VFL at the start of the 2012 season, a role he took on a part-time basis; however, he did not coach out the season, leaving the club on 28 June 2012. Hyde stated that the role was too large for a part-time coach, particularly because his own availability (as dictated by his primary job as a school principal) meant that he could not interact with AFL-listed players from Carlton, the Northern Blues' AFL-affiliate, except on game day.

== Life outside football ==
Hyde was the principal of Epping Primary School - Greenbrook Campus in Epping, Victoria.

== The Robert Hyde medal ==
The Robert Hyde medal is awarded to the Calder Cannons' best and fairest player each year.
