= Thomastown Football Club =

Thomastown Football Netball Club

Names
- Full name: Thomastown Football Netball Club
- Nickname: Bears or Thomo Bears

Club details
- Founded: 1966
- Colours: Brown, Gold and Silver
- Competition: Northern Football League
- President: Rob Mazniovski
- Grounds: Main Street Reserve
- Main St, Thomastown 3074

Other information
- Official website: thomastownfc.com.au

Thomastown Football Club established in 1966 is Australian rules football and netball club in Melbourne, Victoria, Australia. They are now known as the Thomastown Football Netball Club and also known as the Bears or Thomo Bears.

Starting as an Australian rules football club, they entered a Netball team into the NFL competition in 2010. From 2017, the NFL change its name and rebranded as the NFNL by which point Thomastown had entered three netball teams.

Thomastown Football Netball Club are a part of the Northern Football Netball League and are currently in Division Two (Seniors, Reserves and Under 19.5 Marbuilt) in Football and have four teams in Netball.

Their ground is located 17kms north of Melbourne in the suburb of Thomastown.

They have won 4 Senior Premierships across different leagues and divisions.

== Timeline ==
Established as a Junior Club in 1966 to provide recreation for the youth of the local area.

- 1975 - 1979 (VAFA) Under 19s.
- 1975 Senior club was established
- 1976 - 1979 (Panton Hill Football League)
- 1980 - 2000 (VAFA)
- 1983 Win First Senior Premiership (E Grade) | Thomastown (21.12.138) def. Old Trinity (14.9.93)
- 1989 Win Second Senior Premiership (D1 Grade) | Thomastown (21.10.136) def. Old Mentonians (9.16.70)
- 2001 Joined Diamond Valley Football League (Division Two)
- 2007 Joined Northern Football League (Division Two). Thomastown (Reserves) def. Lalor to win Premiership
- 2008 Won Third Senior Premiership (Division Two) | Thomastown (16.10.106) def. Macleod (12.15.87)
- 2009 Joined Northern Football League (Division One) 0 wins 18 losses
- 2010 Thomastown enter Netball team into NFL competition. (Thomastown Football Netball Club)
- 2010 Joined Northern Football League (Division Two).
- 2011 Entered 2 Netball teams into the NFL competition with the A team going down by 5 goals in the Section 3 Grand Final. Under 19's lose the Preliminary Final. Thomastown Auskick commences
- 2013 Joined Northern Football League (Division Three). Thomastown Enter first Junior teams since 1995
- 2014 Win Fourth Senior Premiership (Division Three) Bears (17.16.118) def. Reservoir (5.9.39). U16 win GF defeating Greensborough by 48 points
- 2015 NFL (Division 2) Seniors finish 5th. Reserves win Premiership defeating Whittlesea by 5 points. Thomastown Netball (Team 2) win GF defeating Nth Heidelberg by 5 Goals.
- 2016 NFL (Division 2) Seniors finish 5th. Reserves win Premiership defeating Hurstbridge by 2 points. Thomastown Netball (Team 1) lost GF to Watsonia by 7 goals.
- 2017 NFNL (Division 2) Seniors finish 5th. Thomastown Netball (Team 2) win GF defeating Nth Heidelberg by 5 goals. Thomastown Netball (Team 3) lose GF to Hurstbridge by 12 goals.
- 2018 NFNL (Division 2) Finish 4th losing to Banyule in 1st Semi Final. Thomastown Netball (Team 3) lose GF by 2 goals to Greensborough.

== Premierships ==
1. 1983 (E Grade) Victorian Amateurs Football Association
2. 1989 (D1 Grade) Victorian Amateurs Football Association
3. 2008 (Division 2) Northern Football League
4. 2014 (Division 3) Northern Football League

== Notable AFL Players ==
- Alex Marcou Carlton Football Club / St. Kilda Saints
- David Glascott Carlton Football Club
- Stuart Glascott Carlton Football Club (Reserves) / Brisbane Bears
