= John Carmody (footballer) =

Australian rules footballer

Personal information
- Full name: John Francis Carmody
- Born: 28 June 1938; Melbourne, Victoria
- Died: 25 May 1985 (aged 46); Lower Plenty, Victoria
- Original team: Alphington YCW
- Height: 175 cm (5 ft 9 in)
- Weight: 77 kg (170 lb)

Playing career^{1}
Years	Club	Games (Goals)
1959–1960	Collingwood	16 (6)
1961–1962	Fitzroy	14 (22)
Total		30 (28)
- ^{1} Playing statistics correct to the end of 1962.

John Francis Carmody (28 June 1938 – 25 May 1985) was an Australian rules footballer who played with Collingwood and Fitzroy in the Victorian Football League (VFL).

Carmody, the son of Collingwood premiership player Jack Carmody, was a rover, half forward and wingman. He was recruited from Alphington YCW

He made 11 appearances in his first season, including a semi final, but was called up just five times in 1960 and crossed to Fitzroy.

Carmody captain-coached Greensborough to back to back Diamond Valley Football League premierships in 1966 and 1967.
