= Dennis Aspinall =

Australian rules footballer

Personal information
- Full name: Dennis Aspinall
- Born: 25 July 1947 (age 79); Rome, Italy
- Original team: Reservoir Colts
- Height: 168 cm (5 ft 6 in)
- Weight: 70 kg (154 lb)

Playing career^{1}
Years	Club	Games (Goals)
1966–1967	Fitzroy	9 (10)
- ^{1} Playing statistics correct to the end of 1967.

Dennis Aspinall (born 25 July 1947) is a former Australian rules footballer who played with Fitzroy in the Victorian Football League (VFL).

A Reservoir Colt, Aspinall played Under-19s football for Fitzroy. He spent two seasons with the seniors, playing three games in 1966 and six games in 1967.

Aspinall played for Eltham in 1968 and won the Diamond Valley Football League's best and fairest award that year.

He was also a professional runner and competed in Stawell Gifts.
