= Barry Rist =

Australian rules footballer

Personal information
- Full name: Barry Gordon Rist
- Born: 22 June 1941
- Died: 16 May 2007 (aged 65)
- Original team: Collingwood Fourths
- Height: 171 cm (5 ft 7 in)
- Weight: 86 kg (190 lb)

Playing career^{1}
Years	Club	Games (Goals)
1961–1963	Collingwood	21 (15)
- ^{1} Playing statistics correct to the end of 1963.

Barry Gordon Rist (22 June 1941 – 16 May 2007) was an Australian rules footballer who played for the Collingwood Football Club in the Victorian Football League (VFL).

Rist was among the first players to host a feast of tattoos.

After leaving Collingwood, Rist played for Coburg (1964), Ariah Park (1965-1967), captain/coach for Ardlethan (1968-1970) and then Belgrave (1971).

Rist became a four time premiership coach in the Diamond Valley Football League. When Rist accepted a coaching position he would bring with him a group of good footballers with him. His first success was with Templestowe in 1973. His next success was with Lalor in 1980, then Watsonia in 1987 and finally with Lalor again in 1991.
