= Heidelberg West Football Club =

Names
- Full name: Heidelberg West Football Club
- Nickname: Hawks

2013 season
- Leading goalkicker: Kyl Ewart
- Best and fairest: Dan Bailey

Club details
- Founded: 1936
- Colours: Brown, Gold
- Competition: Northern Football League
- Chairperson: Tom Bennett
- Coach: Derek Shaw
- Captain(s): Dan Bailey & James McLean-Brunton
- Ground: Heidelberg Park
- (capacity: 2000)

Other information
- Official website: Heidelberg West Football Club

Heidelberg West Football Club is an Australian rules football club in Heidelberg West, Victoria, currently competing in Division 3 of the Northern Football League.

== Club history ==
The Heidelberg West Football Club was established in 1936, played in the VAFA in 1939-40 and gained admission into the Diamond Valley Football League (now Northern Football League) in 1941. The club was operated from a small brick clubroom/change room that was later converted into the existing change room facility at the ground. Jack Wood, with the help of a number of members, was responsible for building the additional front end of the clubrooms which still exist today, and have been made a feature piece of the local Heidelberg scenery.

Jack Wood’s family are still involved with the football club today. The rooms were renovated in 2010 thanks to a bequest made by club stalwart Dave Fisher after his passing. The rooms are now known as the "Dave Fisher" clubrooms.

The club enjoyed the ultimate success in their early days, winning the flag shortly after entering the competition in 1941, and also had a period of great success throughout the 70’s and 80’s in the strong Division 1 Diamond Valley Competition. During the 80’s the club also produced three Frank Smith medalists (B&F for DVFL competition) in Brad Dunbar (1988), Mark Perkins (1986) and Kelvin Wood (1984) and in 2017 new club recruit Jarryd Coulson took out league B&F honours in a season of resurgence for the Hawks, making their way up the ladder after many years down the bottom. In 2010 the NFL split Division 2 into another Division with Heidelberg West finishing in the bottom 6.

== Premierships ==
- 1941 - Division 1 Seniors Premiership
- 1955 - Division 1 Reserves Premiership
- 1966 - Division 1 Thirds Premiership
- 2019 - Division 3 Reserves Premiership

== Life Member ==
F Smith, C Hart, D Bennetts, J Sinclair, D Pritchard, J Hughes, A Maxwell, R Scott, L Barnett, B Sedgman, V Reid, R Veitch, W Byrns, B Thomas, M Bloom, B A Sedgman, N McLeod, JC Scarffe, RG O’Rourke, D Fisher, M Hill, C Colbert, D Carpenter, L Butterworth, L Hill, R Maslin, A Hayward, B Reece, P Williams, I Bell, P Boxhall, J Spencer, N Brennan, K Mulgrave, K Scott, D Young, A Fairchild, G Clarence, B Watson Mrs, P Anderson, P Taylor, K Wood, L Cozen, S Reece Mrs, J Wood, K Moore, D Scott, M Fairchild, V Moore Mrs, P Gall, P Russell, T Hogan, I Stillman, G Reinke, D Wood Mrs, P Barnes, D Ilardi, J Cheers, R Edmonds, B Davis, P Byrne, M James, D Moore, P James

== Frank Smith Medallists (competition B & F) ==
2019 Jarryd Coulson

2018 Jarryd Coulson

2017 Jarryd Coulson

1988 Brad Dunbar

1986 Mark Perkins

1984 Kelvin Wood

1964 Pat Foley

1963 Pat Foley

1953 Jack Tucker

== Competition Leading goalkicker ==
2016 Kyl Ewart (62)

1992 Greg Withers (80)

1960 Ivan Francis (67)

1959 Ed Crawley (70)
