= Mernda Football Club =

Mernda Football Netball Club

Names
- Full name: Mernda Football Netball Club
- Nickname: The Demons

2025 season
- After finals: 7th
- Leading goalkicker: Brayden Plant [38]
- Best and fairest: Jayden Bell

Club details
- Founded: 1891
- Colours: Blue Red
- Competition: Northern Football League
- Chairperson: T.Felle
- Coach: R. Fletcher
- Captain(s): Dayne Kellett & Matthew Golledge.
- Ground: Waterview Recreation Reserve

Other information
- Official website: merndafc.com.au

The Mernda Football Club is an Australian rules football club located in Mernda – a suburban north-eastern town of Melbourne - that competes in the Northern Football League (formerly Diamond Valley Football League)

== History ==
The Mernda Football Club was formed in 1891 and was known as the South Yan Yean Football Club. The club went on for 23 years before changing its name to the Mernda Football Club in 1914. In 1932 the club name changed again, this time to become the Plenty Rovers Football Club, where they played at the Doreen Recreation Reserve (behind the Doreen Hall), the Plenty Rovers enjoyed short stints in the DVFL in 1937-9, 1941 and in 1947. In 1965 the club returned to the Mernda Football Club name due to the club moving to the Mernda Recreation Reserve. In 1987 the club rejoined the DVFL in Division 2. In 1991 Mernda won their first DVFL premiership and claimed the Seniors and Reserves double in 2012.

== Current Status ==
As of 2026, the Mernda Football Club's seniors side currently competes in the Division 3 Heidelberg Golf Club Men's. The side is coached by Senior Coach Robert Fletcher, and is captained by Dayne Kellett & Matthew Golledge.

== Premiership Years ==
Northern Football Association

- 1891, 1892

Bourke Evelyn Football Association

- 1909, 1910, 1911, 1912, 1914, 1920

Panton Hill & District Football Association / Panton Hill Football League

- 1936, 1947, 1949, 1950, 1951, 1964, 1971, 1981, 1981, 1982, 1983, 1986

Northern Football League / Diamond Valley Football League

- 1991, 2012
