= Alex Marcou =

Australian rules footballer

Personal information
- Born: 6 July 1958 (age 68)
- Original team: Thomastown (PHFL)
- Debut: Round 3, 1979, Carlton vs. Essendon, at Waverley Park
- Height: 178 cm (5 ft 10 in)
- Weight: 76 kg (168 lb)

Playing career^{1}
Years	Club	Games (Goals)
1979–1986	Carlton	134 (148)
1987–1988	St Kilda	24 (17)
1989	Springvale	9 (11)
Total		167 (176)
- ^{1} Playing statistics correct to the end of 1988.

Alex Marcou (born 6 July 1958) is a former Australian rules footballer. He played with Carlton and St Kilda in the Victorian Football League (VFL) during the 1980s.

A leading junior athlete, for many years Marcou held the Victorian junior triple jump record and competed against future Olympian Gary Honey.

Recruited from Panton Hill Football League club Thomastown, Marcou made his VFL debut for Carlton in 1979, kicking 34 goals and finishing the year a premiership player. He was a rover and played in premiership winning sides again in 1981 and 1982, and represented Victoria at interstate football on three occasions.

In 1987, his first season at St Kilda was a good one for Marcou and he was a fine contributor in a young team. Frustration returned in 1988 however, as more serious hamstring and calf injuries reappeared. Reluctantly, he realised it was time to retire after adding another 24 games and 17 goals to his tally in two seasons at Moorabbin.

In 1989 after retiring from league football, Marcou played at Victorian Football Association club Springvale, the club was being coached by premiership teammate Phil Maylin. He later returned to Carlton as an energetic and active member of the past players. In 2006, he was inducted into the Carlton Hall of Fame.

Marcou is of Greek Macedonian descent.
