= Kevin Hart (footballer) =

Australian rules footballer

Personal information
- Full name: Kevin Francis Hart
- Born: 21 April 1927
- Died: 6 October 2016 (aged 89)
- Original team: Preston YCW
- Height: 171 cm (5 ft 7 in)
- Weight: 70 kg (154 lb)

Playing career^{1}
Years	Club	Games (Goals)
1947–1949	Fitzroy	19 (8)
1950	Carlton	5 (3)
Total		24 (11)
- ^{1} Playing statistics correct to the end of 1950.

Kevin Francis Hart (21 April 1927 – 6 October 2016) was an Australian rules footballer who played with Fitzroy and Carlton in the Victorian Football League (VFL).

A rover, Hart played three league seasons for Fitzroy and one for Carlton.

Hart was a successful player and coach in the Diamond Valley Football League during the 1950s. He won the league's best and fairest award in 1952 and 1955 while with Mcleod, then captain-coached Heidelberg to premierships in 1956 and 1957.
