= John O'Connell (footballer, born 1951) =

Australian rules footballer

Personal information
- Born: 22 April 1951
- Died: 5 November 1989 (aged 38)
- Original team: Fawkner
- Debut: Round 3, 1970, Carlton vs. Richmond, at the MCG
- Height: 183 cm (6 ft 0 in)
- Weight: 82 kg (181 lb)

Playing career^{1}
Years	Club	Games (Goals)
1970–1976	Carlton	111 (0)
- ^{1} Playing statistics correct to the end of 1976.

John O'Connell (22 April 1951 – 5 November 1989) was an Australian rules footballer who played for Carlton in the VFL during the 1970s.

O'Connell made his way into the Carlton side after playing underage football for the club. Although originally a centreman and ruck-rover, he was used as a defender when joined the seniors in 1970. He played most of his games in the back pocket and was a long kick of the ball. O'Connell was a member of Carlton's 1972 premiership team and also played in the side which lost the Grand Final the following season. In the 1973 decider he had been a replacement for the ill Barry Armstrong and was given the role of tagging Richmond star Ian Stewart.
