= Whittlesea Football Club =

Australian rules football club

Names
- Full name: Whittlesea Football Club
- Nickname: The Eagles

2019 season
- After finals: 1st
- Leading goalkicker: Brett Murphy (28 snags)
- Best and fairest: Atch

Club details
- Founded: 1896
- Colours: Navy and Gold
- Competition: Northern Football & Netball League
- Chairperson: Boof Dyson
- Coach: Gaz
- Grounds: Whittlesea Showgrounds (all teams)
- Walker Reserve (Juniors only)
- Stingers joint

Other information
- Official website: whittleseafc.com.au

Whittlesea Football Club is a local Australian rules football club in Whittlesea, Victoria, on the outer suburbs of Melbourne playing in the Northern Football League.

From the club's inception until the 1970s, Whittlesea wore navy guernseys with gold band and trim. Now it wears dark blue with an eagle and wing on the front similar to the West Coast Eagles AFL side.

In 2019 the club entered a team into the AFL Masters League as an over 35s Superules team under the same club name and colours.

In 2020 the club entered the first Senior Women's team at Whittlesea after a successful decade of Junior Girls development which seen Chloe Molloy having a successful career which continues for Collingwood in the AFLW.

== Timeline of different leagues ==
1904 – Whittlesea was a founding club of the Whittlesea DFA.

1906 – Whittlesea played in the Bourke-Evelyn FL

1933 – Whittlesea played in the Panton Hill & DFL

1934 – Whittlesea played in the Diamond Valley FL

1940 – Whittlesea played in the Panton Hill & DFL

1946 – Whittlesea played in the Diamond Valley FL

1947 – Whittlesea played in the Panton Hill FL

1987 – Whittlesea played in the Riddell DFL

Whittlesea changed name to Northern Eagles FC.

1992 – Whittlesea played in the Diamond Valley FL (now Northern Football League), and changed the name back to the Whittlesea Football Club

== Premierships 17 ==
- 1907 – Bourke-Evelyn FL
- 1923 – Bourke-Evelyn FL
- 1924 – Bourke-Evelyn FL
- 1925 – Bourke-Evelyn FL
- 1932 – Panton Hill & District Football Association
- 1954 – Panton Hill & District Football Association
- 1957 – Panton Hill & District Football Association
- 1958 – Panton Hill & District Football Association
- 1959 – Panton Hill & District Football Association
- 1960 – Panton Hill & District Football Association
- 1973 – Panton Hill FL
- 1974 – Panton Hill FL
- 1988 – Riddell DFL Division Two as Northern Eagles
- 2010 – Northern Football League Division Two - 2010 Northern Football League Division Two Grand Final played at Preston City Oval 11 September Whittlesea 9.17.71 defeated Lower Plenty 9.3.57
- 2013 – Northern Football League Division Two - 2013 Northern Football League Division Two Grand Final played at Preston City Oval 14 September Whittlesea 17.14.116 defeated Fitzroy Stars 14.13.97
- 2015 - Northern Football League Division Two - 2015 Northern Football League Division Two Grand Final played at Preston City Oval 12 September Whittlesea 14.13.97 defeated Lalor 14.10.94
- 2019 - Northern Football League Division Two - 2019 Northern Football League Division Two Grand Final played at Preston City Oval 14 September Whittlesea 10.14.74 defeated Banyule 6.11.47
