= Bernie Massey =

Australian rules footballer (1939–2023)

Personal information
- Born: 12 August 1939
- Died: 19 June 2023 (aged 83); Gold Coast, Queensland, Australia
- Original team: Glen Iris
- Height: 184 cm (6 ft 0 in)
- Weight: 83 kg (183 lb)

Playing career^{1}
Years	Club	Games (Goals)
1960–1967	Melbourne	99 (0)
- ^{1} Playing statistics correct to the end of 1967.

Bernard Dean Massey (12 August 1939 – 19 June 2023) was an Australian rules footballer who played with Melbourne in the Victorian Football League (VFL) during the 1960s.

Massey played mostly as a fullback and starred in Melbourne's 1964 premiership side, keeping Collingwood full-forward Ian Graham goalless in the Grand Final. His last VFL season was in 1967 and he went on to become the captain-coach of Eltham Football Club. He holds the record for the most games played for Melbourne without scoring a goal.

Bernie Massey died on the Gold Coast on 19 June 2023, at the age of 83. His funeral was held in Tweed Heads on 27 June 2023.
