= Wayne Headlam =

Australian rules footballer and coach

Personal information
- Full name: Wayne V. Headlam
- Born: 22 December 1948 (age 77)
- Original team: Pascoe Vale
- Height: 193 cm (6 ft 4 in)
- Weight: 95 kg (209 lb)
- Position: Ruckman

Playing career^{1}
Years	Club	Games (Goals)
1969–1973	Essendon	60 (25)
- ^{1} Playing statistics correct to the end of 1973.

Wayne Headlam (born 22 December 1948) is a former Australian rules footballer who played with Essendon in the Victorian Football League (VFL).

Headlam, a ruckman, was recruited from Pascoe Vale and played for Essendon at under-19s level. He won the Essendon District Football League's best and fairest award in 1968.

He played five seasons at Essendon and left to take the position of Diamond Creek senior coach in 1974.

After spending time away from the game to study, Headlam reappeared in 1976, playing for Coburg.

In 1978 he joined Doncaster, as captain-coach.

He was back at Diamond Valley Football League club Diamond Creek in 1980 and remained there until 1984. His best seasons were in 1981 and 1982, when he won back-to-back Frank Smith Medals.
