= Hurstbridge Football Club =

Australian rules football club

Hurstbridge Football Netball Club

Names
- Full name: Hurstbridge Football Netball Club
- Nickname: The Bridges

2026 season
- After finals: 7th
- Leading goalkicker: Joel Naylor
- Best and fairest: Lachlan East

Club details
- Founded: 1914
- Colours: Navy and Gold
- Competition: Northern Football League
- President: Taylor Hopkins, Peter Stewart (VP)
- Coach: Joel Cordwell
- Captain: Ethan Taylor
- Ground: Ben Frilay Oval

Other information
- Official website: hurstbridgefc.com.au

Hurstbridge Football Club is an Australian rules football club located 34 km north east of Melbourne in the township of Hurstbridge. The club currently competes in the Northern Football League.

== History ==
From the 1890s, social football was played at Lew Curtis's Flat, Hurstbridge. In 1914, the Hurstbridge Football Club was founded and matches were played in the Bourke Evelyn Football League. Hurstbridge transferred to the Heidelberg District Football Association for just the one season in 1921 before returning to the Bourke-Evelyn Football League. The Club moved activities to the newly developed Memorial Park (now known as the Ben Frilay Oval) in 1922.

In 1923, the Club joined the Diamond Valley Football League for the first time and their initial match was hosting Eltham Football Club.

In 1924 the team purchased new jerseys and socks at the League's insistence that clubs wear uniform colours. In the early days Hurstbridge wore a Black guernsey with a yellow sash. Later, the club wore navy guernseys with a white HFC monogram.

The club went into recess between 1925 and 1928, before rejoining the Diamond Valley Football League for the 1929 season. Hurstbridge joined the newly formed Panton Hill Football League in 1932. When this league went into recess in 1937 & 1938, Hurstbridge returned to the DVFL, only to return to the PHFL in 1939 where it remained until the league's demise at the end of the 1987 Season. Hurstbridge enjoyed considerable success in the PHFL winning seven premierships.

In 1988 with the club rejoining the D.V.F.L changed its strip to its current blue and yellow guernseys to avoid clashes with existing clubs. In 2003 Hurstbridge broke a long drought winning the Second Division premiership defeating Lalor. Promotion to the highly competitive First Division in 2004 saw the Club failing to win a match and was relegated back to the Second Division for the 2005 Season where it has remained.

After Thirteen Rounds of the 2009 Season, Division Two was split with the ninth to fourteenth clubs relegated to a new Third Division. Hurstbridge having finished tenth was placed into this new Grade and after five Rounds of Division Three finished Second and contested Finals and eventually played off in the inaugural 2009 Division Three Grand Final which Hurstbridge lost to Parkside 8.17.65 to 12.9.81

The 2010 Division Three Grand Final played on 4 September at Epping Oval against Parkside resulted in Hurstbridge's ninth premiership defeating Parkside 7.10.52 to 2.7.19 and promotion to Northern Football League Division Two in 2011.

== Premierships ==
=== Panton Hill Football League ===
- Seniors (7):

1935, 1948, 1952, 1962, 1965, 1968, 1970,

=== Northern Football League (formerly Diamond Valley Football League) ===
- Seniors Division 2 (2):

2003, 2016

- Seniors Division 3 (1):

2010

- Senior Women's Division 3 (1)

2022

- Under 17 – Division 2 (3):

1994, 2005, 2011

- Under 17 – Division 3 (1)

1993

- Under 15's Division 2 (2):

2009, 2011

- Under 15 – Division 3 (1):

1997

- Under 14 – Division 3 (1):

2009

- Under 13 – Division 2 (1):

2004

- Under 13 – Division 3 (1):

1994

- Under 12 – Division 2 (1):

1998

- Under 11 – Division 2 (1):

1995

- Under 11 – Division 3 (2):

2000, 2009

- Under 10 – Division 3 (1):

2000
