= North Heidelberg Football Club =

Names
- Full name: North Heidelberg Football Club
- Nickname: The Bulldogs

2025 season
- After finals: 6th
- Leading goalkicker: Zane Souleiman (32)
- Best and fairest: Ben Big head Giboi

Club details
- Founded: 1958
- Colours: Blue, White and Red
- Competition: Northern Football Netball League
- President: Warren Haysom
- Coach: Kasey Duncan
- Captain: Brody Bell
- Ground: Shelley Park Reserve

Other information
- Official website: northheidelbergsc.com.au

North Heidelberg Football Club is an Australian rules football club in Heidelberg West, Victoria, currently competing in Division 1 of the Northern Football Netball League.

== Premierships ==
- A Grade Premiers: (6)

1962, 1978, 1985, 1987, 1994, 2005

== Notable players ==
- Ross 'Twiggy' Dunne
- Jason Heatley
- Jake King
- Shane Harvey
- Jamie Shaw
- Robert Powell
- Robert Harvey
