= Graham Campbell (footballer) =

Australian rules footballer (1936–2022)

Personal information
- Full name: Graham Fraser Campbell
- Born: 22 July 1936
- Died: 30 January 2022 (aged 85); Adelaide, South Australia
- Original team: Northcote Stars
- Debut: Round 10, 1956, Fitzroy vs. Carlton, at Brunswick Street Oval
- Height: 177 cm (5 ft 10 in)
- Weight: 73 kg (161 lb)

Playing career^{1}
Years	Club	Games (Goals)
1956–1964	Fitzroy	151 (154)

Coaching career
Years	Club	Games (W–L–D)
1974, 1978	Fitzroy	25 (8–17–0)
1975–1977	West Perth	68 (43–25–0)
1983–1984	Glenelg	47 (27–20–0)
- ^{1} Playing statistics correct to the end of 1964.

Career highlights
- Fitzroy Club Champion: 1957; 2× Night premierships: 1959, 1978; WANFL premiership coach: 1975

Graham Fraser Campbell (22 July 1936 – 30 January 2022) was an Australian rules footballer who played 151 games for the Fitzroy Football Club in the Victorian Football League from 1956 until 1964.

== Playing career ==
In his playing days Campbell was both a rover and half-forward, at his peak in 1957 when he won Fitzroy's Best & Fairest award, the Mitchell Medal. He was a handy and consistent goal-kicker for the Lions, kicking at least 18 goals in all but his first and last season. Although the club had limited success in this era he did play in a Preliminary Final with the club in 1960 and in their Night Premiership side (Pre-season premiership) in 1959.

== Coaching career ==
Campbell later turned to coaching and after a stint with the reserves he got his first taste of the big time when he was briefly Fitzroy's caretaker coach following Graham Donaldson's resignation in 1974. The next year he joined West Perth and coached them to the 1975 WAFL premiership.

He was coach of West Perth until 1977 before returning to Fitzroy where was appointed their senior coach. It started well for Campbell as he steered the Lions to another Night Premiership but the 1978 season would be his only year in charge as the Lions finished out of the finals in ninth position.

When Percy Johnson was fired as West Perth coach during the middle of the 1979 season Campbell was brought back and he stayed until the end of the 1981 season. However, he had no further success at West Perth with the club failing to make the final four in any of the years from 1979 to 1981. Ross Gibbs debuted for West Perth in 1979 and he later played under Campbell again at Glenelg.

From 1983 to 1984, he was coach of Glenelg Football Club in the South Australian National Football League. Campbell's career in Adelaide got off to a bad start as Glenelg lost their first eight games of the 1983 season. He was actually sacked by the club at one point during this run, but was re-appointed the following day. After losing their first eight games, the Tigers started to return to the form which had seen them play in the previous two Grand Finals as they made a bid for the finals. Their run was halted with a 74-point loss to eventual premiers West Adelaide in Round 21 (of 22 rounds).

Campbell continued as Glenelg coach in 1984 with the team improving to finish a strong 3rd, but he wasn't retained at the end of the year, bringing the curtain down on a 28-year career in league football. He was replaced as coach by former Glenelg champion player Graham Cornes.

== Television career ==
A speaker with the "gift of the gab", Campbell stayed in Adelaide and put his vast football knowledge to good use, spending the next few years as an analyst for various Adelaide based television stations covering the SANFL.

== Personal life and death ==
Campbell died after a long illness in Adelaide, on 30 January 2022, at the age of 85.
