= Greensborough Football Club =

Names
- Full name: Greensborough Football Club
- Nickname: The Boro
- Motto: Actis Non Verbis (Actions Not Words)

2017 season
- After finals: 4th
- Leading goalkicker: Josh Grubb (26)
- Best and fairest: Jack Johnston

Club details
- Founded: 1893
- Colours: Green and White
- Competition: Northern Football Netball League
- Coach: Robert Hyde
- Captain(s): Matthew Hyde, Lachie McQuilken
- Premierships: Division 1: 1922, 1925, 1927, 1931, 1934, 1952, 1955, 1958, 1960, 1961, 1966, 1967, 1983, 1984, 1988, 1989, 2014; Division 2: 2006
- Ground: War Memorial Park

Other information
- Official website: greensboroughfc.com.au

Greensborough Football Club is an Australian rules football club in Greensborough, Victoria, currently competing in the Northern Football Netball League.

== History ==
The Greensborough Football Club was founded in 1893 playing its first game against Diamond Creek.

In 1922 the club became affiliated with the Diamond Valley Football League (DVFL) and were premiers in their inaugural year. Greensborough were 1 of 6 original teams in the DVFL. To date the club has won 17 A grade 1st Division premierships, and been runners up 15 times. Currently, the club plays their home games at War Memorial Park in Greensborough and fields 3 teams in Division 1 each week.

== Current status ==
In recent years the club has achieved success in Division 1 since being promoted from 2nd Division in 2006 after winning Premierships in all three age groups (Seniors, Reserves, Under 19s). In 2010 Greensborough defeated Heidelberg, making it Heidelberg's first loss in 2 1/2 years (798 days) and 48 straight wins. The club finally played in a Division 1 finals series in 2011 finishing 3rd after the home and away series and have been very competitive since. The club won the Northern Football League A Grade premiership in 2014 under coach Robert Hyde who had guided the club to premierships in 1983 and 1984.

== Club honours ==
=== Northern Football League Premierships ===
Seniors: (18)

1922, 1925, 1927, 1931, 1934, 1952, 1955, 1958, 1960, 1961, 1966, 1967, 1983, 1984, 1988, 1989, 2006*, 2014

Reserves: (10)

1954, 1961, 1962, 1972, 1984, 2005*, 2006*, 2015, 2017, 2021^

Thirds: (15)

1969, 1970, 1972, 1974, 1979, 1990, 2004*, 2006*, 2009, 2010, 2011, 2014, 2015, 2016, 2023

*Division 2

^Awarded minor Premiership due to shortened season [Covid 19]

=== Competition Best & Fairest Winners ===
A Grade

- Joe Murphy (1954)
- Don McDowell (1958)
- Joe Murphy (1961)
- Wayne Dobson (1983)
- Wayne Dobson (1987)
- Peter Mastin (1991)
- Neil Brindley (1991)
- Tom Bell (2019)

B Grade

- Graeme Clark (1988)
- David Kelly (1989)
- Graeme Clark (1990)
- Leigh Millsom (2011)

C Grade

- Steven Schellenberger (1984)

=== Competition Leading Goal Kickers ===
- Ray Skals (1957, 96 Goals)
- Bruce McDowell (1975, 86 Goals)
- Bruce McDowell (1976, 97 Goals)
- Glenn Townsend (1985, 103 Goals)
