= Montmorency Football Club =

Australian rules football club in Victoria

Names
- Full name: Montmorency Football Club
- Nickname(s): The Magpies, Monty

2017 season
- After finals: 7th
- Leading goalkicker: Patrick Fitzgerald (47)
- Best and fairest: Patrick Fitzgerald

Club details
- Founded: 1924
- Colours: White and Black
- Competition: Northern Football League
- Chairperson: Nick Thomas
- Coach: Ben Haynes
- Captain(s): Craig Flint, Jesse Donaldson (co captains)
- Ground: Montmorency Park

Other information
- Official website: www.montmorencyfootballclub.com.au

Montmorency Football Club is an Australian rules football club in Montmorency, Victoria, currently competing in Division 1 in the Northern Football League.

== History ==
The club was formed in 1924 by Harold Hodgson and was originally based at Memorial Park, Greensborough. In 1925, the club relocated to its current home and joined the Diamond Valley Football League, where it competed until 1931 before going into recess. The club was revived in 1936 and returned to the DVFL, where it has remained ever since. Montmorency won its first premiership in 1951, followed by a second premiership in 1954. It was then another 22 years before the club won its third premiership in 1976. After the grand final defeats in 1977 and 1978, the club won its fourth and most recent A Grade premiership in 1979. In 2007, the Diamond Valley Football League was renamed the Northern Football League.
