= List of VFL debuts in 1940 =

The 1940 Victorian Football League (VFL) season was the 44th season of the VFL. The season saw 115 Australian rules footballers make their senior VFL debut and a further 24 transfer to new clubs having previously played in the VFL.

== Summary ==
Summary of debuts in 1940
Club	VFL debuts	Change of club
Carlton	6	1
Collingwood	11	2
Essendon	9	1
Fitzroy	10	6
Footscray	7	3
Geelong	3	0
Hawthorn	17	2
Melbourne	7	0
North Melbourne	13	3
Richmond	8	1
South Melbourne	13	3
St Kilda	11	2
Total	115	24

== Debuts ==
Name	Club	Age at debut	Round debuted	Games	Goals	Notes
Jim Mooring	Carlton	22 years, 196 days	1	126	161	
Jack Bennett	Carlton	19 years, 332 days	4	119	46	
Gordon Cameron	Carlton	18 years, 97 days	6	17	1	
Bert McTaggart	Carlton	24 years, 49 days	7	9	6	
Bernie Bignell	Carlton	23 years, 20 days	7	6	0	
Jack Bavin	Carlton	22 years, 284 days	5	5	1	
Dick Chandler	Carlton	30 years, 100 days	12	1	1	Previously played for Hawthorn.
Harry Mears	Collingwood	18 years, 109 days	16	62	61	
Jack Pimm	Collingwood	19 years, 224 days	4	58	113	
Ron Carruthers	Collingwood	21 years, 322 days	12	48	3	Father of Ron Carruthers Jr..
Bill Noonan	Collingwood	23 years, 122 days	10	42	16	
Dan Knott	Collingwood	21 years, 319 days	2	18	2	Brother of Arch and George Knott.
Charlie Newman	Collingwood	19 years, 150 days	2	17	0	
Colin Campbell	Collingwood	22 years, 137 days	4	17	4	
Norm Oliver	Collingwood	18 years, 16 days	18	13	2	
Ken Williams	Collingwood	22 years, 139 days	5	12	2	
Kevin Barrett	Collingwood	24 years, 292 days	1	4	4	
Bennie Le Sueur	Collingwood	23 years, 78 days	7	3	0	Previously played for Footscray.
Leo Tyrrell	Collingwood	25 years, 27 days	10	2	0	Previously played for North Melbourne.
Geoff Nicholls	Collingwood	20 years, 288 days	11	2	2	
Gordon Lane	Essendon	19 years, 44 days	12	131	256	
Cec Ruddell	Essendon	22 years, 340 days	1	122	0	
Allan Hird	Essendon	21 years, 365 days	15	102	2	Father of Allan Hird Jr. and grandfather of James Hird. Previously played for Hawthorn.
Harold Lambert	Essendon	18 years, 51 days	11	99	2	Brother of Chris Lambert.
Norm Betson	Essendon	25 years, 343 days	8	78	41	
Joe Evans	Essendon	20 years, 28 days	4	21	1	
Ivor McIvor	Essendon	22 years, 329 days	15	12	9	
Max Smith	Essendon	24 years, 135 days	4	7	2	Brother of Clive Smith.
Charlie Challenger	Essendon	22 years, 161 days	4	2	0	
Jack Hunter	Essendon	25 years, 275 days	11	2	7	
Alan Ruthven	Fitzroy	18 years, 80 days	11	222	442	1950 Brownlow Medallist.
Bert Clay	Fitzroy	25 years, 46 days	9	157	48	Brother of Ivor Clay.
Stan Wright	Fitzroy	22 years, 102 days	8	81	37	
Ken Sier	Fitzroy	18 years, 217 days	18	59	61	
Des Calverley	Fitzroy	20 years, 186 days	5	52	16	
Lindsay Dyring	Fitzroy	21 years, 169 days	9	45	5	
Alf Clay	Fitzroy	26 years, 110 days	1	41	17	Previously played for Hawthorn and Footscray.
Kevin Fox	Fitzroy	22 years, 204 days	1	22	32	Previously played for Carlton.
Ted Hill	Fitzroy	26 years, 103 days	1	22	2	Previously played for Collingwood.
Shadrach James	Fitzroy	22 years, 163 days	3	18	20	Cousin of Doug Nicholls.
Syd McGain	Fitzroy	23 years, 133 days	8	12	0	Previously played for Essendon.
Bob Merrick	Fitzroy	22 years, 155 days	1	6	2	
Alan Muir	Fitzroy	18 years, 242 days	1	6	0	
Lindsay McNamara	Fitzroy	21 years, 279 days	4	4	1	Previously played for South Melbourne.
Keith Forbes	Fitzroy	33 years, 363 days	5	4	10	Previously played for Essendon and North Melbourne.
Wal Dudley	Fitzroy	22 years, 24 days	9	3	4	Played first-class cricket for Victoria.
George Tribe	Footscray	19 years, 262 days	9	66	80	Australian Test cricketer. Brother of Tom Tribe.
Ted Ellis	Footscray	27 years, 64 days	1	65	2	Father of Lindsay and Kingsley Ellis, and grandfather of Daniel Merriweather. Previously played for North Melbourne.
Len Murphy	Footscray	30 years, 163 days	2	25	28	Brother of Frank Murphy. Previously played for Collingwood.
Bill Crosling	Footscray	21 years, 263 days	15	17	5	
Harry Dolphin	Footscray	21 years, 264 days	4	15	0	
Billy Power	Footscray	22 years, 365 days	13	12	0	
Jim May	Footscray	30 years, 12 days	1	6	3	
Dick Chirgwin	Footscray	26 years, 52 days	16	3	0	Previously played for Richmond and South Melbourne.
Alf Boniface	Footscray	23 years, 126 days	6	2	0	
Lloyd Robinson	Footscray	22 years, 113 days	18	1	0	
Bill Harwood	Geelong	19 years, 232 days	2	69	16	
Len Toyne	Geelong	17 years, 339 days	8	35	15	
Ron Sceney	Geelong	22 years, 233 days	6	2	3	
Wally Culpitt	Hawthorn	22 years, 118 days	3	125	116	
Kevin Curran	Hawthorn	19 years, 172 days	7	85	9	
Colin Austen	Hawthorn	19 years, 217 days	11	85	0	1949 Brownlow Medallist.
Jack Carmody	Hawthorn	28 years, 325 days	1	64	46	Previously played for Collingwood.
Dudley Bragg	Hawthorn	23 years, 64 days	1	44	1	
Laurie Peters	Hawthorn	24 years, 72 days	17	24	0	
Reg Bell	Hawthorn	26 years, 224 days	1	23	0	
Bert Graham	Hawthorn	19 years, 183 days	18	23	9	
Alan Barelli	Hawthorn	20 years, 61 days	13	18	16	
Ern Elder	Hawthorn	23 years, 178 days	7	12	0	
Wally Bristowe	Hawthorn	18 years, 105 days	15	11	4	
Brendan Brady	Hawthorn	23 years, 161 days	12	8	7	
Vin Doherty	Hawthorn	29 years, 32 days	1	5	13	Previously played for Collingwood.
Bruce Hone	Hawthorn	26 years, 276 days	1	5	3	
Reg Farrant	Hawthorn	19 years, 308 days	12	5	1	
Dick Pirrie	Hawthorn	20 years, 86 days	18	3	0	Son of Richard Pirrie, brother of Kevin Pirrie and uncle of Stephen Pirrie.
Max Carmichael	Hawthorn	20 years, 28 days	4	2	3	
Roy Long	Hawthorn	25 years, 292 days	9	2	0	
Kevin Landrigan	Hawthorn	23 years, 226 days	18	1	0	
Col McLean	Melbourne	19 years, 336 days	11	138	1	
Shane McGrath	Melbourne	20 years, 354 days	5	118	3	
Adrian Dullard	Melbourne	22 years, 225 days	17	116	143	Father of Anthony Dullard.
Fred Fanning	Melbourne	18 years, 174 days	1	104	411	Holds the record for most goals in a VFL/AFL match, with 18.
Bernie Neenan	Melbourne	22 years, 306 days	14	8	11	
Jack Atkins	Melbourne	23 years, 144 days	3	4	1	Son of Ernie Atkins.
Noel Ellis	Melbourne	19 years, 46 days	17	3	0	
Jock McCorkell	North Melbourne	21 years, 300 days	1	167	5	
Arthur Slater	North Melbourne	25 years, 196 days	10	39	27	Previously played for Essendon.
Geoff Willis	North Melbourne	18 years, 328 days	12	36	3	
Col Spratling	North Melbourne	22 years, 74 days	11	18	7	
Jack Ryan	North Melbourne	25 years, 146 days	1	9	2	Previously played for Footscray.
Laurie Davies	North Melbourne	23 years, 287 days	4	9	3	
Vin Casey	North Melbourne	22 years, 104 days	16	8	2	
Vin Hogan	North Melbourne	19 years, 215 days	7	7	0	
Len Thomas	North Melbourne	26 years, 131 days	1	6	9	Son of Bill Thomas. Previously played for South Melbourne and Hawthorn.
Ray Wynd	North Melbourne	19 years, 231 days	17	4	3	
Merv Bolger	North Melbourne	20 years, 353 days	6	3	0	
Norm Tomkinson	North Melbourne	22 years, 194 days	9	2	2	
Ray Bromley	North Melbourne	24 years, 329 days	16	2	0	
Neil Hasell	North Melbourne	21 years, 337 days	16	2	0	
Trevor Jones	North Melbourne	22 years, 106 days	16	1	1	
Jack Kenny	North Melbourne	25 years, 96 days	18	1	0	
Leo Merrett	Richmond	20 years, 50 days	5	170	53	
Bill Perkins	Richmond	20 years, 153 days	9	148	10	
Bernie Waldron	Richmond	20 years, 80 days	7	83	22	
Ray Steele	Richmond	22 years, 344 days	1	42	1	Grandfather of Stuart Steele.
Roy Quinn	Richmond	20 years, 345 days	8	25	25	Son of Billy Quinn.
Jack Quinn	Richmond	22 years, 25 days	11	19	14	Played for South Melbourne earlier in the 1940 VFL season.
Joe Reilly	Richmond	23 years, 244 days	4	17	0	
Bill Cosgrove	Richmond	21 years, 168 days	1	3	0	Killed in action in 1943. Uncle of Peter Cosgrove.
Alby Hodges	Richmond	22 years, 99 days	14	1	0	
Billy King	South Melbourne	19 years, 338 days	13	136	17	
Don Grossman	South Melbourne	19 years, 143 days	4	93	32	
Howard Jasper	South Melbourne	20 years, 326 days	14	26	3	
Ian Chinn	South Melbourne	23 years, 28 days	6	17	28	
Harry Gray	South Melbourne	24 years, 18 days	3	9	5	
Stan Brown	South Melbourne	18 years, 241 days	11	9	4	
Frank Hill	South Melbourne	26 years, 102 days	9	5	0	
George Bates	South Melbourne	26 years, 127 days	4	3	0	Previously played for Collingwood and Richmond.
Merv Dudley	South Melbourne	23 years, 78 days	16	3	7	
Arthur Turner	South Melbourne	20 years, 217 days	16	3	0	
Kevin O'Halloran	South Melbourne	25 years, 108 days	2	2	3	Father of Eddie O'Halloran. Previously played for St Kilda.
Jack Fergeus	South Melbourne	22 years, 31 days	11	2	1	
Gordon Hamilton	South Melbourne	20 years, 28 days	15	2	0	Drowned aged 20, while attempting to save the life of a young girl.
Keith Virtue	South Melbourne	23 years, 125 days	18	2	3	
Dick Chirgwin	South Melbourne	20 years, 137 days	2	1	0	Previously played for Richmond.
Keith McNaughton	South Melbourne	19 years, 11 days	18	1	0	
Bob Wilkie	St Kilda	19 years, 334 days	6	117	13	Brother-in-law of Jack and Tom Meehan.
Ernest McIntyre	St Kilda	19 years, 85 days	12	80	57	Played first-class cricket for Victoria.
Keith Miller	St Kilda	20 years, 165 days	3	50	42	Played Test cricket for Australia.
Ron McLeod	St Kilda	21 years, 205 days	14	39	35	Previously played for North Melbourne.
Jack Cliff	St Kilda	20 years, 347 days	2	32	8	
Norm Raines	St Kilda	19 years, 253 days	6	19	17	
Jack Bray	St Kilda	24 years, 198 days	14	17	18	
Terry O'Brien	St Kilda	21 years, 235 days	10	13	21	
Ron Mudge	St Kilda	19 years, 243 days	15	11	1	
Marcus Hines	St Kilda	20 years, 250 days	14	6	2	
Eddie Cranage	St Kilda	23 years, 10 days	9	4	0	
Jack Rogers	St Kilda	27 years, 154 days	18	4	0	
Laurie Taylor	St Kilda	23 years, 222 days	11	1	0	Previously played for South Melbourne.
