= Deaths in October 2000 =

The following is a list of notable deaths in October 2000.

Entries for each day are listed alphabetically by surname. A typical entry lists information in the following sequence:

- Name, age, country of citizenship at birth, subsequent country of citizenship (if applicable), reason for notability, cause of death (if known), and reference.

== October 2000 ==
=== 1 ===
- Robert Allen, 73, American composer ("(There's No Place Like) Home for the Holidays", "Everybody Loves a Lover", "Chances Are"), colon cancer.
- Grace Bilger, 93, American painter.
- John David Blake, 91, Australian trade union organiser.
- Charlie Brewster, 83, American baseball player.
- Leon Brogden, 90, American football, basketball and baseball coach.
- René Coicaud, 73, French fencer and Olympian (1956).
- Rosie Douglas, 58, Prime Minister of Dominica and human rights activist.
- Aristeidis Kollias, 56, Greek lawyer, publicist, and folklorist, leukemia.
- Robert Petersen, 86, American Olympic speed skater (1936).
- Luciano Storero, 74, Italian prelate of the Roman Catholic Church.
- Reginald Kray, 66, British criminal, bladder cancer.

=== 2 ===
- Kerstin Ahlqvist, 73, Swedish alpine skier and Olympian (1952).
- Bill Crosling, 81, Australian rules footballer.
- Keith Daniels, 51-52, American football coach, stroke.
- Nikolai Fedorenko, 87, Soviet philologist, orientalist, and diplomat.
- Amadou Karim Gaye, 86, Senegalese politician.
- Richard Liberty, 68, American actor, heart attack.
- Elek Schwartz, 91, Romanian football player and coach.
- David Tonkin, 71, Australian politician, Premier of South Australia (1979-1982).
- Halbert Owen Woodward, 82, American district judge (United States District Court for the Northern District of Texas).

=== 3 ===
- Klondike Bill, 68, Canadian professional wrestler, neuromuscular disorder.
- Reg Butcher, 84, English footballer.
- Stu Calver, 53-54, British musician, cystic fibrosis.
- Dick Chirgwin, 86, Australian rules footballer.
- Wojciech Jerzy Has, 75, Polish film director, screenwriter and film producer.
- Udo Klug, 72, German football player and manager.
- M. M. Mustapha, 76, Ceylonese lawyer and politician.
- Benjamin Orr, 53, American bassist and singer (The Cars), pancreatic cancer.
- John Worsley, 81, British artist and illustrator.

=== 4 ===
- Rhadi Ben Abdesselam, 71, Moroccan long-distance runner and Olympic silver medalist (1960), arteriosclerotic heart disease.
- Tofig Guliyev, 82, Azerbaijani composer, pianist, and conductor.
- Masaji Iguro, 87, Japanese Olympic ski jumper (1936), pneumonia.
- Teruo Itokawa, 59, Japanese Olympic shot putter (1964).
- Aleksey Ivanovich Kandinsky, 82, Soviet musicologist.
- Tin Maung, 92, Burmese film actor, director and producer.
- Chuck Oertel, 69, American baseball player (Baltimore Orioles).
- Jerzy Otfinowski, 93, Polish footballer.
- Egano Righi-Lambertini, 94, Italian prelate of the Roman Catholic Church.
- Ludvík Ráža, 71, Czechoslovak film director.
- Michael Smith, 68, English-Canadian chemist, Nobel Prize laureate.
- Yu Kuo-hwa, 86, Chinese politician, Premier (1984–1989), complications from leukemia.

=== 5 ===
- David Ananou, 83, Togolese writer, painter and church musician.
- Leopold Barschandt, 75, Austrian football player.
- Sonja Bullaty, 76, Czech-American photographer, cancer.
- Johanna Döbereiner, 75, Brazilian agronomist.
- Ruth Ellis, 101, American LGBT rights activist.
- Cătălin Hîldan, 24, Romanian football player, heart attack.
- Keith Roberts, 65, English science fiction author, multiple sclerosis.
- Cuco Sánchez, 79, Mexican singer, songwriter, guitarist, and actor, kidney failure.
- Sergey Saychik, 43, Soviet Russian Olympic ski jumper (1972).
- Sidney R. Yates, 91, American politician (member of the United States House of Representatives from the state of Illinois).

=== 6 ===
- Ronald L. Bonkowski, 62, American politician, aneurysm.
- Kevin Brown, 67, Australian footballer.
- William Bundy, 83, American attorney and CIA operative, heart problems.
- José Cabanis, 78, French novelist, historian and magistrate.
- John T. Connor, 85, American government official and businessman, leukemia.
- Dominick J. DeMichele, 84, American engineer.
- Richard Farnsworth, 80, American actor (The Straight Story, Comes a Horseman, Misery) and stuntman, suicide by gunshot.
- Bernardo González, 31, Spanish cyclist and Olympian (1988, 1996), traffic collision.
- John Keller, 71, American basketball player and Olympian (1952).
- Per-Olov Löwdin, 83, Swedish physicist.
- K. Gunn McKay, 75, American politician, complications of mesothelioma.
- George Huntston Williams, 86, American theologian.
- Charles B. Yates, 61, American politician, member of the New Jersey General Assembly (1974-1978) and Senate (1978-1982), plane crash.

=== 7 ===
- Tony Adamle, 76, American professional football player (Cleveland Browns), cancer.
- Peter Emil Becker, 91, German neurologist, psychiatrist and geneticist.
- Berta Jikeli, 89, Romanian Olympic discus thrower (1928).
- Bob Johnson, 83, American basketball player.
- Leslie Kish, 90, Hungarian-American statistician.
- Walter Krupinski, 79, German Luftwaffe fighter ace during World War II.
- Noor Suzaily Mukhtar, 24, Malaysian software engineer, strangled.
- Edith Robinson, 94, Australian track and field athlete and Olympian (1928).

=== 8 ===
- Hanson Matthew Adjei-Sarpong, 75, Ghanaian politician.
- Harold Cameron, 87, New Zealand cricketer.
- Robert Crowley, 76, American CIA officer.
- Charlotte Lamb, 62, British novelist.
- Vsevolod Larionov, 72, Soviet and Russian stage and film actor.
- Robert M. Leeds, 79, American film editor and television director.
- Clarence Myerscough, 69, British violinist.
- Mihai Pop, 92, Romanian ethnologist.
- Timothy P. Sheehan, 91, American politician, member of the United States House of Representatives (1951-1959).
- E. S. Johnny Walker, 89, American politician, member of the United States House of Representatives (1965-1969), leukemia.

=== 9 ===
- Gilberto Andrade, 62, Brazilian footballer.
- Robert Frederick Bennett, 73, American lawyer and politician, Governor of Kansas, lung cancer.
- Klaas Beuker, 76, Dutch politician.
- George W. Clarke, 89, Canadian lawyer.
- David Dukes, 55, American character actor, heart attack.
- James V. Hartinger, 75, United States Air Force general.
- Charles Hartshorne, 103, American philosopher.
- Lajos Kocsis, 53, Hungarian footballer and Olympian (1968, 1972).
- H. R. Loyn, 78, British historian, heart failure brought on by a diabetic crisis.
- Patrick Anthony Porteous, 82, Scottish recipient of the Victoria Cross.
- Leonid Potapov, 95, Russian ethnographer.
- John Joseph Thomas Ryan, 86, American prelate of the Roman Catholic Church.

=== 10 ===
- Sirimavo Bandaranaike, 84, Prime Minister of Sri Lanka, heart attack.
- Ken Bloxham, 46, New Zealand rugby union footballer, cancer.
- Oswaldo Calisto Rivera, 21, Ecuadorian poet and artist.
- Ferenc Farkas, 94, Hungarian composer.
- Joe Grady, 82, American radio personality.
- Dick Klein, 80, American businessman and founder of the Chicago Bulls.
- Sam Klepper, 40, Dutch gangster, shot.
- Emile Kuri, 93, Mexican-American set decorator.
- Nikolai Lyashchenko, 90, Soviet Army general and war hero.
- Ambrogio Morelli, 94, Italian road bicycle racer.
- Bruce Palmer, Jr., 87, American Army general.
- Bruce Vento, 60, American politician, lung cancer caused by asbestos.

=== 11 ===
- Bernard P. Brockbank, 91, American Mormon missionary.
- Bryan Conlon, 57, English footballer.
- Pulin De, 86, Bangladeshi socialist leader.
- Donald Dewar, 63, Scottish politician, cerebral haemorrhage.
- Hiroshi Inose, 73, Japanese electrical engineer, heart attack.
- Matija Ljubek, 46, Croatian sprint canoeist and Olympic champion (1976, 1980, 1984, 1988), shot.
- Sam O'Steen, 76, American film editor and director.
- Pietro Palazzini, 88, Italian Cardinal.
- Thomas Leonard Wells, 70, Canadian politician, cancer.
- Fred Williams, 71, American gridiron football player (Chicago Bears, Washington Redskins), stroke.

=== 12 ===
- Justo Arosemena Lacayo, 70, Colombian sculptor.
- Jim Carter, 71, American baseball player.
- Melvin A. Cook, 89, American chemist, complications from surgery.
- Mark Saxelby, 31, English cricket player, suicide by herbicide ingestion.
- Gordon Stulberg, 76, Canadian-American film executive and lawyer, complications related to diabetes.

=== 13 ===
- Anderson Carter, 74, American politician.
- John Davis, 57, English cricketer.
- Masao Fujii, 31, Japanese baseball player.
- Gus Hall, 90, American labor leader and chairman of the Communist Party USA, complications from diabetes.
- Robert Klein, 75, German Olympic gymnast (1956).
- Jean Peters, 73, American actress, leukemia.
- Duggie Du Preez, 73, South African Olympic boxer (1948).
- Jarnail Singh, 64, Indian football player and Olympian (1960).
- Britt Woodman, 80, American jazz trombonist.

=== 14 ===
- Sebastião Alba, 60, Portuguese poet, road incident.
- Art Coulter, 91, Canadian ice hockey player (Chicago Black Hawks, New York Rangers).
- Jennifer Dawson, 71, English novelist.
- Dino Dibra, 25, Australian organized crime figure, shot.
- Abbas Gharabaghi, 81, Iranian Army officer and Chief of Staff, cancer.
- David Guiney, 79, Irish Olympic athlete (1948), sports journalist and historian.
- Giorgio Piccinelli, 70, Italian Olympic canoeist (1952).
- Tony Roper, 35, American stock car racing driver, neck injury from a crash in the 2000 O'Reilly 400.
- Vic Schwall, 75, American gridiron football player (Chicago Cardinals).

=== 15 ===
- Manuel da Luz Afonso, 83, Portuguese football manager.
- Ted Berry, 94, American politician.
- Konrad Emil Bloch, 88, German-American biochemist, recipient of the Nobel Prize in Physiology or Medicine, heart failure.
- Vincent Canby, 76, American film and theatre critic (The New York Times), cancer.
- Justus Cornelias Dirks, 89, South African writer.
- Mathias Jamtvedt, 78, Norwegian Olympic gymnast (1952).
- John Perceval, 77, Australian artist.
- Rodolfo Sonego, 79, Italian screenwriter.

=== 16 ===
- Emil Berna, 93, Swiss cinematographer.
- Eugen Brixel, 61, Austrian composer, musician and musicologist, cancer.
- Marvin P. Bryant, 75, American microbiologist and bacteriologist.
- Mel Carnahan, 66, American lawyer and Governor of Missouri (since 1993), plane crash.
- Antonio Ferrandis, 79, Spanish actor, chronic obstructive pulmonary disease.
- David Golub, 50, American pianist and conductor, lung cancer.
- Tito Gómez, 80, Cuban singer.
- Rick Jason, 77, American actor, suicide by gunshot.
- Pierre-Michel Le Conte, 79, French conductor.
- Tom Lund, 55, Danish handballer and Olympian (1972).
- Joaquín Gutiérrez Mangel, 82, Costa Rican writer, heart failure.
- Antonio Russo, 40, Italian journalist, tortured.
- Alfred Schoebel, 89, French Olympic swimmer (1932).
- Joseph Scott, 78, American Olympic bobsledder (1952).
- Lu Xiaopeng, 80, Chinese aircraft designer.

=== 17 ===
- Frederick S. Clarke, 50/51, American magazine publisher and editor, suicide
- G. Arthur Cooper, 98, American paleobiologist.
- Harry Cooper, 96, English-American PGA Tour golfer.
- Donna Jogerst, 68, American baseball player.
- Joachim Nielsen, 36, Norwegian rock musician and poet, heroin overdose.
- Leo Nomellini, 76, Italian-American football player (San Francisco 49ers) and member of the Pro Football Hall of Fame, stroke.
- Ivan Owen, 73, British voice actor, cancer.
- Walter Shenson, 81, American film producer, director and writer.

=== 18 ===
- Bruce Biggs, 79, New Zealand linguist.
- Inga Gill, 75, Swedish film actress, thrombosis.
- Julie London, 74, American singer and actress, cardiac arrest.
- Sidney Salkow, 89, American screenwriter and film/television director, natural causes.
- Gwen Verdon, 75, American actress (Damn Yankees, Chicago, Cocoon), four-time Tony winner, heart attack.

=== 19 ===
- Don Black, 72, Rhodesian tennis player, complications from bowel cancer surgery.
- Wayne Garrison Blair, 70, American clubwoman.
- Mahir Domi, 85, Albanian linguist and academic.
- Hortense Ellis, 59, Jamaican reggae musician, infectious disease.
- Kay Fanning, 73, American journalist and publisher.
- Shirley Gorelick, 76, American artist.
- Kati Horna, 88, Hungarian-Mexican photojournalist and photographer.
- Antonio Maspes, 68, Italian sprinter cyclist and Olympic medalist (1952).
- Seikan Oki, 93, Japanese Olympic sprinter (1932).
- Charles Perkins, 64, Australian Aboriginal activist, and soccer player, renal failure.
- Leopoldo Savona, 87, Italian actor, director, choreographer, and screenwriter.
- Karl Stein, 87, German mathematician.

=== 20 ===
- Guillermo Barbadillo, 75, Peruvian footballer.
- Jinks Coleman, 55-56, American college sports coach, cancer.
- Ken Deas, 73, New Zealand cricketer and administrator.
- Johannes Abraham Dimara, 84, Indonesian revolutionary and National Hero.
- Elisa Galvé, 78, Argentine actress.
- Jenny Kastein, 87, Dutch competition swimmer and Olympian (1936).
- Kalfie Martin, 90, South African military commander.
- Charles Pepys, 8th Earl of Cottenham, 51, English peer,
- Boris Seidenberg, 71, Soviet actor.

=== 21 ===
- Gunnar Andresen, 76, Norwegian footballer.
- John Bisdee, 84, British flying ace.
- Frankie Crocker, 62, American disc jockey, pancreatic cancer.
- Alan Rowe, 73, New Zealand-born British actor.
- Dirk Jan Struik, 106, Dutch-American mathematician and historian of mathematics.
- Ralph A. Vaughn, 93, American academic, architect and film set designer.
- John Wiatrak, 87, American football player (Detroit Lions).

=== 22 ===
- Abdur Rehman, 82, Pakistani cricketer.
- Franciszka Cegielska, 54, Polish politician, pancreatic cancer.
- Anthony Chinn, 70, Guyanese actor based in England, brain haemorrhage.
- Suzanne Haïk-Vantoura, 88, French organist, music teacher, composer and music theorist.
- Jean-Luc Mandaba, 57, prime minister of the Central African Republic, heart attack.
- Fred Pratt Green, 97, British Methodist minister and hymn writer.
- Princess Xenia Andreevna Romanovsky, 81, Russian noblewoman.
- Dick Spiers, 62, English football player.
- Hank Wyse, 82, American baseball player (Chicago Cubs, Philadelphia Athletics, Washington Senators).

=== 23 ===
- Willi Burgard, 73, German Olympic triple jumper (1952).
- Desmond Conacher, 81, Canadian classical scholar.
- Benny Culp, 86, American baseball player (Philadelphia Phillies).
- Bernard Dutoit, 76-77, Swiss Olympic basketball player (1948).
- Hans Ertl, 92, German mountaineer and Nazi propagandist.
- Doug Millward, 69, English football player.
- Martin Rich, 95, German conductor.
- Nils Täpp, 82, Swedish cross-country skier and Olympic champion (1948, 1952).
- Yokozuna, 34, American professional wrestler, pulmonary edema.

=== 24 ===
- Bruce Burgess, 74-75, Australian rugby league footballer.
- Terry Haskins, 45, American Republican politician, melanoma.
- Sitaram Kesri, 80, Indian politician and parliamentarian.
- Fereydoon Moshiri, 74, Iranian poet, leukemia.
- Lazar Naroditsky, 62, Soviet Ukrainian Olympic middle-distance runner (1964).
- Silvio Noto, 73, Italian TV and radio presenter, and actor.
- Miriam Salpeter, 71, Latvian-American neuroscientist, thyroid cancer.
- Daniel E. Sheehan, 83, American prelate of the Roman Catholic Church, Archbishop of Omaha.
- Little Mack Simmons, 67, American blues musician, colon cancer.

=== 25 ===
- Kamran Baghirov, 67, Soviet politician, First Secretary of the Azerbaijan Communist Party.
- Magín Berenguer, 82, Asturian historian, painter and archaeologist.
- José Berrocal, 43, Puerto Rican politician, thymic cancer.
- Don Frank Brooks, 53, American blues musician, leukemia.
- Clarence L. "Ben" Coates, 76, American computer scientist and engineer.
- Hugh B. Cramer, 85, American politician.
- Alberto Demiddi, 56, Argentine rower and Olympic medalist (1964, 1968, 1972).
- Mochitsura Hashimoto, 91, Japanese submarine commander during World War II.
- Adam Krajewski, 71, Polish Olympic fencer (1952).
- Wood B. Kyle, 85, United States Marine Corps Major General.
- Jeanne Lee, 61, American jazz singer, poet and composer, cancer.
- Brian McConnell, Baron McConnell, 77, Northern Irish Unionist politician.
- John Sinclair Morrison, 87, English classicist.
- Ciril Praček, 87, Slovenian Olympic alpine skier (1936, 1948).
- Nejat Saydam, 71, Turkish film director, screenwriter and actor from Istanbul.
- Robert E. Waldron, 80, American politician.

=== 26 ===
- Jesús Puente Alzaga, 69, Spanish actor, heart attack.
- Alden Diehl, 69, Canadian radio executive and comedian.
- Muriel Evans, 90, American actress, colorectal cancer.
- Manmath Nath Gupta, 92, Indian Marxist revolutionary writer and author.
- Laila Kinnunen, 60, Finnish singer.
- Donald F. Lach, 83, American historian and author.
- Ruth Lessing, 75, American baseball player, cancer.
- Mike Rawson, 66, English track and field athlete and Olympian (1956).
- Gardner Soule, 86, American writer.

=== 27 ===
- Lída Baarová, 86, Czech-Austrian actress and mistress of the Nazi minister Joseph Goebbels, Parkinson's disease.
- Walter Berry, 71, Austrian bass-baritone.
- Harish Chandra Buxipatra, 66, Indian politician.
- Winston Grennan, 56, Jamaican drummer, cancer.
- Jack Mackenroth, 84, American football player (Detroit Lions).
- Larry Rhine, 90, American producer and screenwriter, natural causes.
- Stanislav Sventek, 69, Czech ice hockey player, coach, and Olympian (1964).
- Bill Wainwright, 91, British communist activist.
- Clifford Dwight Waldo, 87, American political scientist.
- Bob Weighill, 80, English rugby player.

=== 28 ===
- Andújar Cedeño, 31, Dominican baseball player (Houston Astros, San Diego Padres, Detroit Tigers), car accident.
- Rolf Ericsson, 81, Swedish Olympic ice hockey player (1948).
- Josef Felder, 100, German politician.
- Dorothy Hood, 81, American modernist painter, breast cancer.
- Aare Laanemets, 46, Estonian actor, stroke.
- Dave Latter, 78, American basketball player.
- Anthony Lee, 39, American actor and playwright, shot by police officer.
- Michael Murphy, 81, Irish politician.
- Djaelani Naro, 71, Indonesian politician.
- Fred C. Norton, 72, American judge and politician, bone cancer.
- Howard Patterson, 73, American Olympic swimmer (1948).
- Edith Peters, 74, American singer and actress.
- Irving Phillips, 95, American cartoonist, illustrator, playwright, and author.
- Georges Poujouly, 60, French actor, cancer.
- Robert Sommers, 89, Canadian politician.
- Décio Randazzo Teixeira, 58, Brazilian football player and Olympian (1960).
- Mapalagama Wipulasara Maha Thera, 75, Sri Lankan Buddhist monk.
- Volmer Thomsen, 82, Danish Olympic gymnast (1948, 1952).
- Kemp Tolley, 92, U.S. Navy officer and author, stroke.

=== 29 ===
- Charles F. Avila, 94, American electrical engineer.
- Billy Boyo, 29, Jamaican reggae artist, brain tumour.
- Jacqueline Brumaire, 78, French operatic soprano.
- Elisabeth Epp, 90, German actress.
- Carlos Guastavino, 88, Argentine composer.
- Rolf Hädrich, 69, German film director and screenwriter.

=== 30 ===
- Hugo Adriaensens, 73, Belgian politician.
- Steve Allen, 78, American comedian, TV host (The Tonight Show, The Steve Allen Show) and author, traffic accident.
- Fernando Gutiérrez Barrios, 73, Mexican politician.
- Elizabeth Bradley, 78, English actress (Coronation Street), stroke.
- Charles R. Denny, 88, American official.
- María Elena Galiano, 72, Argentine arachnologist, accident.
- Henri Pichette, 76, French writer and poet.
- Louis Stuyt, 86, Dutch politician and physician.

=== 31 ===
- Ikram Antaki, 52, Syrian-Mexican writer.
- Bill Carse, 86, Canadian ice hockey player (New York Rangers, Chicago Black Hawks).
- Tommy English, 40, Northern Irish loyalist paramilitary and politician, shot.
- Thomas Gifford, 63, American author, cholangiocarcinoma.
- Ring Lardner Jr., 85, American journalist and screenwriter (Woman of the Year, Laura, M*A*S*H), Oscar winner (1943, 1971), cancer.
- Robert C. Murphy, 74, American lawyer and jurist, neuromuscular disease.
- Samuel Pierce, 78, American politician.
- Kaj Aage Gunnar Strand, 93, Danish astronomer.
- Mike Turnesa, 93, American golfer and one of seven golfing brothers.
- Kazuki Watanabe, 19, Japanese musician, sedative overdose.
