= George Moloney =

George Moloney may refer to:

- George Moloney (footballer, born 1909) (1909–1983), Australian rules footballer for Claremont and Geelong, member of the Australian Football Hall of Fame
- George Moloney (footballer, born 1894) (1894–1959), Australian rules footballer for South Melbourne
- George Moloney (footballer, born 1924) (1924–2005), Australian rules footballer for South Melbourne
- George Moloney (footballer, born 1939) (1939–2017), Australian rules footballer for Essendon

== See also ==
- George Maloney (1928–2003), American baseball umpire
