= Bob Wilkie (footballer) =

Australian rules footballer

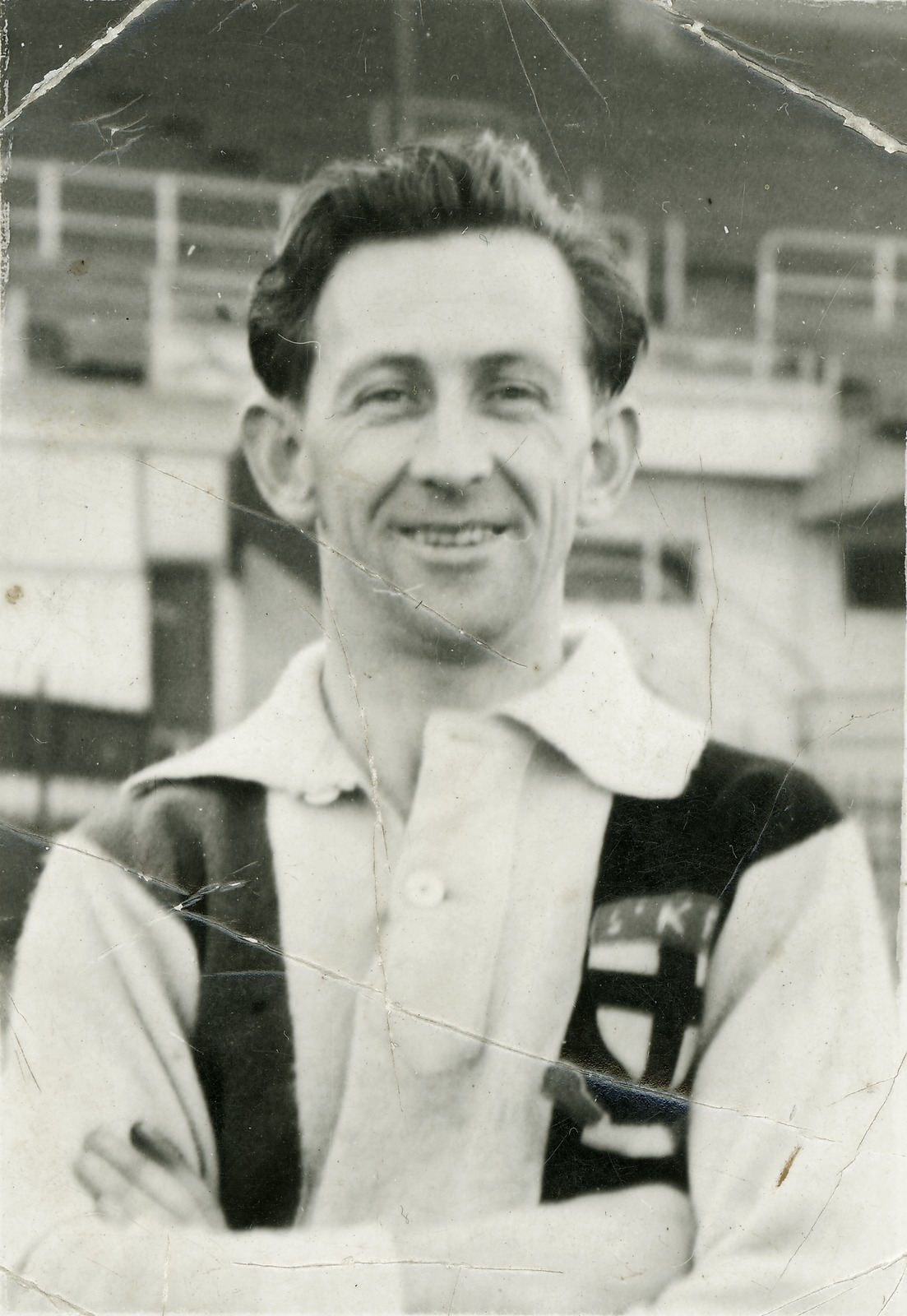

Personal information
- Full name: Robert Lawrence Wilkie
- Born: 3 July 1920; Ballarat, Victoria
- Died: 9 September 2001 (aged 81); Melbourne
- Original team: St Kilda CYMS (CYMSFA)
- Height: 165 cm (5 ft 5 in)
- Weight: 65 kg (143 lb)
- Position: Wing

Playing career^{1}
Years	Club	Games (Goals)
1940–42, 1945–51	St Kilda	117 (13)
- ^{1} Playing statistics correct to the end of 1951.

Robert Lawrence Wilkie (3 July 1920 – 9 September 2001) was an Australian rules footballer who played with St Kilda in the Victorian Football League (VFL).

== Life and career ==
Robert Laurence Wilkie was born at Sebastopol, Ballarat, on 3 July 1920. He played local football before moving to Melbourne to play for St Kilda.

In 1940 he weighed just 9 stone 6 pounds (60 kilograms) and was regarded as the lightest player in the league.

During World War II he served with the RAAF. In 1946 he married Dorothy Meehan, whose brothers, Jack and Tom, also played for St Kilda.

He later held various coaching and administrative posts at the St Kilda club.

His full-time job was with the Herald Sun newspaper. He lived in the Melbourne suburb of Cheltenham.
