= Ron Smith (Australian footballer, born 1914) =

Australian rules footballer (1914–1979)

Personal information
- Full name: Ronald Herbert Smith
- Born: 4 September 1914; Geelong, Victoria
- Died: 23 January 1979 (aged 64); Mildura, Victoria
- Original team: Werribee
- Height: 170 cm (5 ft 7 in)
- Weight: 69 kg (152 lb)

Playing career^{1}
Years	Club	Games (Goals)
1939–41	Essendon	11 (0)
1942–44	North Melbourne	33 (1)
Total		44 (1)
- ^{1} Playing statistics correct to the end of 1944.

Ronald Herbert Smith (4 September 1914 – 23 January 1979) was an Australian rules footballer who played with Essendon and North Melbourne in the Victorian Football League (VFL).

== Family ==
The son of Herbert George Gordon Smith (1885–1966), and Annie Grace Smith (1884–1949), née Harrison, Ronald Herbert Smith was born at Geelong, Victoria on 4 September 1914. Two of his younger brothers, Maxwell Henry Smith (1915–1941) and Clive Wesley Smith (1923–1999), also played VFL football; Max, for Essendon, and Clive, for North Melbourne.

He married Eulalie May Sharp (1915–1999), at Werribee, Victoria on 11 April 1942.

== Education ==
He was educated at Geelong High School.

== Football ==
Originally from Werribee, a wingman able to kick with both feet, he trained with South Melbourne in the 1939 pre-season.

=== Essendon (VFL) ===
Cleared from Werribee South to Essendon, subject to a clearance from Geelong, on 19 April 1939, he made his debut for Essendon, on the wing (replacing the injured Jack Caesar), in the match against Geelong, at the Corio Oval, on 13 May 1939, which was also the occasion of Dick Reynolds' 100th game.

=== North Melbourne (VFL) ===
Cleared from Essendon to North Melbourne on 13 May 1942, he made his debut for North Melbourne, against South Melbourne, at the Arden Street Oval, on 30 May 1942. He was injured in his last match for North Melbourne, against St Kilda, at the Junction Oval, on 2 September 1944.
