= 1739 English cricket season =

Cricket season review

In the 1739 English cricket season, the growth of the sport is evident in the creation of teams representing what may be called the Rest of England or, more colloquially, "All England". The teams were formed to take on Kent which, as in previous seasons, had the game's strongest county team. There was huge public interest in the All England concept, a crowd of over 10,000 assembling for one match.

Cricket joined the art world in 1739, an engraving called Youth Playing Cricket being the earliest known cricket subject on public display.

Details of eight historically important matches are known. (Note: Any match listed in the ACS' Important Match Guide (1981) is historically important, and therefore of the highest standard, whether or not a scorecard might exist. The same applies to numerous matches discovered by researchers since 1981. For further information, see First-class cricket.)

== Kent v England ==
In a match played 9 July on Bromley Common, Kent met a team described as "eleven gentlemen from any part of England, exclusive of Kent". It is the earliest known instance of an England team. These teams were usually called "England" or, loosely, "All England". More accurately, they represented the "Rest of England". Unlike the modern England team, they did not play international matches. An "All England" team is, in effect, the rest of England excluding its opponents so, in this case, players resident in Kent were ineligible for selection. Kent, which had a very strong team in this period, and was described as "the Unconquerable County", won by "a very few notches".

There was a return match 23 July on the Artillery Ground, this one ending in a draw. A report of the game includes the phrase "eleven picked out of all (sic) England". Kent led by over 50 on the first innings, and betting was then 2 to 1 in their favour. The report says: "The Kentish Men were likely to have won, but a Dispute arose whether one of the Londoners was fairly out, which put an End to the Game. There were upwards of 10,000 People to see this Match". One account stated that Kent's opponents were London, but that was an error because "all England" confirms that the match was a return to that played two weeks earlier on Bromley Common.

== London matches ==
London are known to have played in five matches. The first two of these, on 18 and 27 June, were against Lingfield. The venue on 18 June is unknown, but Lingfield won by two wickets. The return match was on the Artillery Ground, but the result is unknown.

On 5 and 19 July 1739, London played two matches against a combined Kingston & Moulsey team. The first was on Moulsey Hurst, and the return on Kennington Common. The London & Country Journal, dated Tuesday, 24 July, reporting on the second match, made references to the first. It seems that Kingston & Moulsey won the first game because of "the Londoners turning out three bad men who played on Moulsey Hurst". Kingston & Moulsey won the second game by three runs despite losing "five of their best hands" from the earlier match. London had replaced the "three bad men" with Lord John Sackville, Mr Dunn, and Mr Boarer (sic) who were described as "three very good gamesters".

London's fifth match was pre-announced by the London Evening Post to be played 5 September against Chislehurst on the Artillery Ground. The result is unknown.

== Other events ==
The earliest known cricket picture was first displayed this year, an engraving called Youth Playing Cricket by Hubert-François Gravelot (1699–1773). The picture showed two groups of cherubic lads gathered around a batter and a bowler. The wicket shown is the "low stool" shape, probably two feet wide by one foot tall, naturally with two stumps and a single bail. Gravelot helped to establish the French Rococo style in English publishing, and was one of the most celebrated illustrators of the time. He worked in England between 1732 and 1745, opening a drawing school on the Strand which had Thomas Gainsborough (1727–1788) among its pupils.

According to Ian Maun on page 96 of his book, there was an Essex v London match in Ilford on "Monday, 1 August" (sic), but this is an error as 1 August 1739 was a Wednesday. The match in question is the one played on Monday, 1 August 1737.

Construction work on Lamb's Conduit Field meant cricket could no longer be played there. Thomas Coram's Foundling Hospital was established on the site in 1739.

On Monday, 20 August, a 12-a-side game was organised on Coxheath Common by the Earl of Middlesex and Lord John Sackville between teams from the Sevenoaks (aka the Hills) and Maidstone (aka the Dales) areas.

== John Bowra ==
John Bowra, who was called "Mr Boarer" when he played for London on 24 July, was a leading player in the 1730s and much of the 1740s. He played mostly for Bromley, where he was a colleague of Robert Colchin. Known as the "Kentish Shepherd", he is believed to have been the father of William Bowra.

== First mentions ==
=== Clubs and teams ===
- Kingston & Moulsey
- Lingfield
- England (i.e., the "rest" of England)

=== Players ===
- John Bowra

== Bibliography ==
- ACS (1981). A Guide to Important Cricket Matches Played in the British Isles 1709–1863. Nottingham: ACS. OCLC 85045528.
- Buckley, G. B. (1935). Fresh Light on 18th Century Cricket. Birmingham: Cotterell & Co. OCLC 23450280.
- Major, John (2007). More Than A Game. London: HarperCollins. ISBN 978-00-07183-64-7 – via Internet Archive.
- Maun, Ian (2009). From Commons to Lord's, Volume One: 1700 to 1750. Cambridge: Roger Heavens. ISBN 978-19-00592-52-9.
- Waghorn, H. T. (1899). Cricket Scores, Notes, &c. From 1730–1773. Edinburgh: Blackwood. OCLC 1086375331.
