= Ron Carruthers =

Ron Carruthers may refer to:

- Ron Carruthers (footballer, born 1918), Australian rules footballer for Collingwood
- Ron Carruthers (footballer, born 1943), Australian rules footballer for Collingwood, son of the above
