= Chirgwin =

Chirgwin is a surname. Notable people with the surname include:

- Brian Chirgwin (born 1948), Australian rules footballer
- Dick Chirgwin (1914–2000), Australian rules footballer
- George H. Chirgwin (1854–1922), British music hall star
