= Lloyd Robinson =

Lloyd Robinson may refer to:

- Lloyd Robinson (footballer) (1918–1967), Australian rules footballer
- Lloyd Robinson (cricketer) (1912–1996), Welsh cricketer
