= Dyring =

Dyring is a surname. Notable people with the surname include:

- Lindsay Dyring (1919–2008), Australian rules footballer
- Moya Dyring (1909–1967), Australian artist
- Theodor Dyring (1916–1975), Norwegian politician
- Victoria Dyring (born 1972), Swedish TV host and film producer
