= Kevin Wade (footballer) =

Australian rules footballer

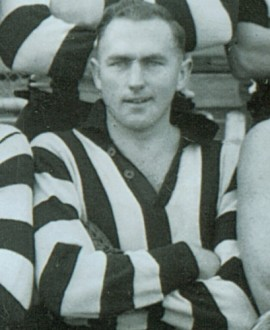
- Wade in 1942

Personal information
- Full name: Kevin Gerard Wade
- Born: 30 June 1922
- Died: 18 July 2001 (aged 79)
- Original team: Northcote CYMS (CYMSFA)
- Height: 180 cm (5 ft 11 in)
- Weight: 73 kg (161 lb)
- Position: Defender

Playing career^{1}
Years	Club	Games (Goals)
1942–1949	Collingwood	111 (20)
- ^{1} Playing statistics correct to the end of 1949.

Kevin Gerard Wade (30 June 1922 – 18 July 2001) was an Australian rules footballer who played with Collingwood in the Victorian Football League (VFL).

Wade, who arrived at Collingwood from CYMS Football Association (CYMSFA) club Northcote CYMS, started his career as a half forward and kicked four goals in a win over Hawthorn in round 16 of the 1942 VFL season. By 1945 he was being used as a half back flanker and was one of just three Collingwood players to play all 22 games that year, including their 10-point preliminary final loss to Carlton. He also played finals football for Collingwood in 1946 and 1948.

At the start of the 1950 football season he joined Camberwell briefly, but was unable to get a clearance and returned to Collingwood. He was then, on 25 May, reported to be in transfer talks with the Hawthorn Football Club. Just four days after this was reported he broke his leg in a seconds match against Richmond.
