= Ananou =

Ananou is a Togolese surname. Notable people with the surname include:

- David Ananou (1917–2000), Togolese writer
- Frederic Ananou (born 1997), Togolese footballer
