= Ollie Lord =

Australian rules footballer (born 2002)

Personal information
- Full name: Oliver Lord
- Born: 2 January 2002 (age 24)
- Original team: Caulfield Bears/Sandringham Dragons
- Draft: No. 49, 2020 AFL draft
- Debut: Round 6, 2023, Port Adelaide vs. West Coast, at Adelaide Oval
- Height: 197 cm (6 ft 6 in)
- Weight: 92 kg (203 lb)
- Position: Key forward

Playing career^{1}
Years	Club	Games (Goals)
2021–2026	Port Adelaide	35 (33)
- ^{1} Playing statistics correct to the end of 2026.

Ollie Lord (born 2 January 2002) is a professional Australian rules footballer who most recently played for the Port Adelaide Football Club in the Australian Football League (AFL). Standing at 197cm tall, he mostly plays as a key forward but can also play as a ruckman.

== Early football ==
Lord is from Victoria and attended school at Geelong Grammar as a boarder. He played his junior football for the Caulfield Bears and later for the Sandringham Dragons in the NAB League. In 2019, he trained with Melbourne as part of the NAB AFL Academy program. Lord grew up supporting Geelong, and his father Darren Lord was previously on Geelong's list for two years. He is the grandson of former Geelong Brownlow Medalist Alistair Lord, and the great-nephew of Geelong premiership player Stewart Lord. He was drafted by the Port Adelaide Football Club with pick number 49 in the 2020 AFL draft.

== AFL career ==
Lord spent his first two seasons at Port playing in the South Australian National Football League (SANFL) for their reserves team. He made his AFL debut in Round 6 of the 2023 AFL season, against the West Coast Eagles at the Adelaide Oval. Lord was an important player in Port Adelaide's four-point win over Melbourne in Round 10, kicking two goals during the match, including a clutch last-quarter goal to help win the game.

Lord kicked a career-best four goals in Port Adelaide's qualifying final loss against the Brisbane Lions at The Gabba, and was subsequently named as one of the best players in the match report.

Lord only managed six games for the 2024 AFL season due to injury. In April of 2026, Lord ruptured his ACL while playing for Port Adelaide in the SANFL, ruling him out for the remainder of the 2026 AFL season. He was delisted at the conclusion of the 2026 season, with hopes of finding another club.

== Statistics ==
Updated to the end of the 2026 season.

Legend
G	Goals	K	Kicks	D	Disposals	T	Tackles
B	Behinds	H	Handballs	M	Marks	H/O	Hit-outs

Season	Team	No.	Games	Totals								Averages (per game)								Votes
Season	Team	No.	Games	G	B	K	H	D	M	T	H/O	G	B	K	H	D	M	T	H/O	Votes
2023	Port Adelaide	30	13	15	10	47	48	95	31	20	17	1.2	0.8	3.6	3.7	7.3	2.4	1.5	1.3	0
2024	Port Adelaide	30	6	6	3	23	10	33	14	9	1	1.0	0.5	3.8	1.7	5.5	2.3	1.5	0.2	0
2025	Port Adelaide	30	15	12	8	45	47	92	34	16	17	0.8	0.5	3.0	3.1	6.1	2.3	1.1	1.1	0
2026	Port Adelaide	30	1	0	1	4	3	7	1	2	7	0.0	1.0	4.0	3.0	7.0	1.0	2.0	7.0	0
Career			35	33	22	119	108	227	80	47	42	0.9	0.6	3.4	3.1	6.5	2.3	1.3	1.2	0
