= Laurie Davies =

Laurie Davies may refer to:

- Laurie Davies (footballer) (1916–2005), Australian rules footballer
- Laurie Davies (politician) (1962–) California politician
