= List of fatalities while playing cricket =

The following is a list of cricket players who died while playing a game, died directly from injuries sustained while playing, or died after being taken ill on the ground.

Player	Cause	Date	Place
(England) Jasper Vinall	Struck on the head by a bat as a result of a double-hit attempt.	28 August 1624	Horsted Keynes, Sussex
(England) Henry Brand	Struck on the head by a bat. Notable for being a similar double-hit to Vinall, which may have resulted in the 1744 codification of the rule.	1647	Selsey, West Sussex.
(England) John Boots	Killed while batting. He collided with his partner whilst going for a run. Both men were knocked down but got up again, only for Boots to drop down dead as he was running to his wicket.	31 May 1737	Newick, Sussex
(England) Frederick, Prince of Wales	Keen on cricket and real tennis, it's been speculated that he died from either a pulmonary embolism or a burst abscess caused by being hit with a ball	20 March 1751	London
(England) James Balchen	"Killed by a cricket ball"	buried 14 June 1764	Godalming, Surrey
(England) George Summers	Struck on the head by a ball bowled by John Platts.	29 June 1870	Nottingham
(England) John Hamilton Plumptre Lighton	Son of Rev. Sir Christopher Lighton, Baronet; struck by a return drive by a batsman	12 July 1872	Repton, Derbyshire
(England) William Jupp	Died after suffering a brain injury during a cricket match.	3 August 1878	Chertsey, Surrey
(England) Claude Wilson	Killed by sunstroke	29 June 1881	Betchworth, Surrey
(England) Lord Fitzroy Somerset	Youngest son of the Duke of Beaufort; collapsed and died of suspected heart failure	23 July 1881	near Tetbury, Gloucestershire
(England) Frederick Randon Sr.	Struck on the head by a ball at Lord's in 1881, from which he never fully recovered, dying in February 1883	17 February 1883	Hathern, Leicestershire
(England) Frederick Jackman	Collapsed while batting	5 September 1891	Horndean, England
(Australia) Charles Lane	Struck over the heart by a ball	20 May 1895	Cosme, Paraguay
(England) Arthur Earlam	Struck by a return drive by the batsman	July 1921	Runcorn, Cheshire
(Australia) Walter Duff	Died of complications from a broken leg during a cricket match.	11 November 1921	Sydney, Australia
(England) Edward Cox	Heart failure while playing cricket	23 July 1925	Holyport, Berkshire, England
(Australia) William John Griffiths	Struck by a ball in the head when attempting to take a catch during practice resulting in a skull fracture.	16 October 1928	Melbourne, Australia
(Australia) Max Smith	Struck by a ball (bowled by his younger brother Clive Smith) which deflected into his head.	27 October 1941	Werribee, Australia
(England) Andy Ducat	Heart failure	23 July 1942	London
(England) Tom Killick	Heart problem	18 May 1953	Northampton
(Pakistan) Abdul Aziz	Struck over the heart by a ball	17 January 1959	Karachi, Sindh, Pakistan
(Australia) Martin Bedkober	Died when hit over the heart by a cricket ball; flatmate of Jeff Thomson	13 December 1975	Brisbane, Queensland
(England) Michael Ainsworth	"Suddenly"	28 August 1978	Hillingdon, London
(England) Wilf Slack	Collapsed while batting	15 January 1989	Banjul, the Gambia
(England) Ian Folley	Heart attack while being treated in hospital for eye injury sustained on the field	30 August 1993	Whitehaven, Cumbria
(India) Raman Lamba	Struck on the head by a ball while fielding	23 February 1998	Dhaka, Bangladesh
(Barbados) Mark Lavine	Heart attack	12 May 2001	Coventry, England
(Pakistan) Wasim Raja	Suffered a heart attack on the pitch	23 August 2006	Marlow, Buckinghamshire
(South Africa) Darryn Randall	Struck on the head by a ball	27 October 2013	Alice, Eastern Cape
(Australia) Phillip Hughes	Struck on the neck by a ball during a Sheffield shield match bowled by Sean Abbott	27 November 2014	Sydney, New South Wales
(Namibia) Raymond van Schoor	Stroke	20 November 2015	Windhoek, Namibia
(India) Rajesh Ghodge	Collapsed while playing in a local cricket tournament	13 January 2019	Margao, Goa, India
(India) Shyamji Kanojia	Heart attack while fielding in a senior veterans cricket match.	3 January 2021	Virar, Mumbai
(Australia) Ben Austin	Struck on the neck by a ball during practice	28 October 2025	Melbourne, Australia

== Bibliography ==
- Buckley, G. B. (1935). Fresh Light on 18th Century Cricket. Birmingham: Cotterell & Co. OCLC 23450280.
- McCann, Tim (2004). Sussex Cricket in the Eighteenth Century (PDF). Vol. 88. Lewes: West Sussex Record Office. ISBN 978-08-54450-55-8.
