= Reg Bell =

Reg Bell may refer to:

- Reg Bell (footballer) (1913–2009), Australian rules footballer
- Reg Bell (cricketer) (1893–1960), New Zealand rugby union player and cricketer

== See also ==
- Reginald Bell (1901–1980), lawyer, judge and political figure on Prince Edward Island
- Reggie Bell (1904–1988), British middle-distance runner
