= Andy Monahan =

Australian rules footballer

Personal information
- Full name: Adrian Patrick Barry Monahan
- Born: 3 November 1927; Geelong, Victoria
- Died: 11 May 2010 (aged 82)
- Original team: Geelong CYMS (CYMSFA)
- Height: 183 cm (6 ft 0 in)
- Weight: 84 kg (185 lb)

Playing career^{1}
Years	Club	Games (Goals)
1945–1951	Geelong	45 (9)
- ^{1} Playing statistics correct to the end of 1951.

Adrian Patrick Barry "Andy" Monahan (3 November 1927 – 11 May 2010) was an Australian rules footballer who played for the Geelong Football Club in the Victorian Football League (VFL).
