= Darryn Randall =

South African cricketer (1980–2013)

Darryn Randall (2 December 1980 – 27 October 2013) was a South African cricketer. He was a right-handed batsman and wicket-keeper who played for Border during the 2009–10 season, making four first-class and four List-A appearances. He was born in East London. Randall made his first-class debut against Northerns on 8 October 2009.

== Death ==
Randall died on 27 October 2013 at the age of 32 after being hit on the head by a cricket ball during a match in Alice, Eastern Cape. He died immediately when the ball impacted his head while attempting a pull shot.

== See also ==
- List of unusual deaths in the 21st century
- Ray Chapman, an American baseball player killed after being struck by a ball during a game; he was the only player in Major League Baseball history to die of an in-game injury
- List of fatal accidents in cricket
