= Michael Ainsworth =

English cricketer

Michael Lionel Yeoward Ainsworth (13 May 1922 – 28 August 1978) was an English cricketer: a right-handed batsman who played his county cricket for Worcestershire but also appeared on a number of occasions for Combined Services and Free Foresters.

Born in Hooton, near Ellesmere Port, Cheshire, Ainsworth made his first-class debut for Combined Services against Surrey, in 1946; he also played against Worcestershire a fortnight later and made 50 not out at number nine. His next first-class games were not until 1948, when he joined Worcestershire and made 71 in his first innings, against Kent.

In all he played eight times for the county in 1948, as well as making four more appearances for Combined Services. The highlight was his first century, a match-saving 100 against Warwickshire at Dudley in a game in which Worcestershire, having been set 269 to win, were in dire straits at 245/9 when stumps were drawn. In all he made 559 first-class runs at 26.61, recording very similar figures in his 1949 season in which he hit 96 against Kent.

Although he won his county cap from Worcestershire in that 1949 season, in fact Ainsworth played only once more for the county thereafter, in May 1950, making just 1 and 7 against Middlesex. He did also appear several more times for Combined Services, but then played no first-class cricket for three years until playing for Combined Services twice and Free Foresters once in 1953; he took the first of just two first-class wickets while playing for Free Foresters against Oxford University that year.

For the next ten years Ainsworth continued to appear occasionally, at first for Combined Services but latterly exclusively for Free Foresters. In 1958 he made 76 and 106 for the Free Foresters against Cambridge University, and also took his second and final wicket for Combined Services against Warwickshire. A year later, he made his highest first-class score of 137 for Free Foresters against Cambridge University, eventually being caught by Henry Blofeld off the bowling of Simon Douglas-Pennant.

Ainsworth played five more times in first-class cricket, all for Free Foresters against Cambridge. His last match was in 1964 when he scored 53 and 34; this was the Free Foresters' penultimate first-class game, although they have played many subsequent games that did not qualify as first-class matches.

On retiring from the Navy, he joined the staff at Ludgrove School, Wokingham, under the former Yorkshire captain, Alan Barber.

He was the father of Peter Ainsworth (16 November 1956 – 6 April 2021) a British Conservative politician who served as Member of Parliament (MP) for East Surrey from 1992 to 2010.

He died "suddenly" in Hillingdon, London, at the age of 56, while playing in a cricket match.

== See also ==
- List of fatalities while playing cricket
