= Ted Ellis (footballer) =

Australian rules footballer

Personal information
- Full name: Edward James Ellis
- Born: 23 February 1913; Carlton, Victoria
- Died: 5 August 2007 (aged 94); Rye, Victoria
- Height: 188 cm (6 ft 2 in)
- Weight: 92 kg (203 lb)

Playing career^{1}
Years	Club	Games (Goals)
1933–1939	North Melbourne	85 (41)
1940–1944	Footscray	65 (2)
Total		150 (43)
- ^{1} Playing statistics correct to the end of 1944.

Career highlights
- Con Curtain trophy: 1942

Edward James Ellis (23 February 1913 – 5 August 2007) was an Australian rules footballer who played with North Melbourne and Footscray in the Victorian Football League (VFL).

Ellis was a utility player and made his league debut with North Melbourne in 1933. He represented Victoria at interstate football in the 1937 Perth Carnival. In 1940, he changed clubs, moving to Footscray where he played mostly in defence. Ellis won the Footscray best and fairest award in 1942.

During the depression of the 1930s, Ellis, at the age of 15, took swag to back and headed to country Victoria in search of work. Outside of football, Ellis was a fireman, and drove a truck on his rostered days off. He had six children, nine grandchildren and six great grandchildren. His two eldest sons also played League football: Lindsay Ellis played for Footscray and Kingsley Ellis played for Fitzroy. One of Ellis's grandsons, Daniel Merriweather, is an ARIA award winning singer-songwriter.
