= 1737 English cricket season =

Cricket season review

In the 1737 English cricket season, Frederick, Prince of Wales was a significant patron, while Kent, who twice defeated a combined London and Surrey team, was the strongest county.

Details of fourteen historically important matches are known. (Note: Any match listed in the ACS' Important Match Guide (1981) is historically important, and therefore of the highest standard, whether or not a scorecard might exist. The same applies to numerous matches discovered by researchers since 1981. For further information, see First-class cricket.)

== Kent v London & Surrey ==
A London & Surrey combine, sponsored by the Prince of Wales, played two matches against Kent, sponsored by Lord John Philip Sackville.

There was crowd trouble at the first match, played 15 June on Kennington Common. One report says: "the Mob outrageously threw Dirt, Dung, etc. on Account of the people's entering within the Line". A week later, a man called John Smith died from complications of a wound caused when he was hit by one of the stones being thrown. Another report says "the Press (i.e., crowd pressure) was so great" that a woman suffered a broken leg "by the Crowd bearing upon her". Kent scored 99 and 70/7 declared. Surrey replied with 31 and 98, so Kent won by 40 runs.

The return match was played 6 July on Bromley Common. According to a newspaper report, Kent "maintained their honour, and beat their adversaries at one hands", which means they won by an innings.

== Essex v London ==
On 25 July, London defeated Essex by 45 runs at the Artillery Ground. This is the earliest known match in which Essex played as a single county, having earlier combined with Hertfordshire. Essex and London met again on 1 August at an unknown venue in Ilford, where Essex won by 7 runs. This is the earliest known organised match that was definitely played in the county of Essex.

== London v Surrey ==
A Surrey v London match, to be played 27 July on Moulsey Hurst, was organised by the Prince of Wales (Surrey) and the 3rd Duke of Marlborough (London) for £500 a side. It was announced by the General Evening Post on Thursday, 21 July, but no report of the game has been found.

== Chertsey v London ==
On 6 September, London defeated Chertsey by 5 wickets at Moulsey Hurst. The match was reported by the Grub Street Journal. A Chertsey player broke a finger, and this had a bearing on the result. Chertsey scored 45 and 66. London scored 81 and 31/5.

== Single wicket ==
In August, two unnamed players, one from Wandsworth and one from Mitcham, described as "two of the most celebrated sportsmen in the game", played a match on Kennington Common. The Mitcham man was hit on the head by the ball in his first innings. Despite concussion, he continued to play, but was "beaten by a considerable number of notches".

== Other events ==
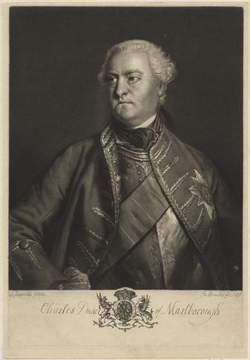
Charles Spencer, 3rd Duke of Marlborough, captained a team in 1737.

In May, there was a tragic incident in a local match at Newick, in Sussex, when a player called John Boots was killed after he collided with his partner whilst going for a run. Both men were knocked down but got up again, only for Boots to drop down dead as he was running to his wicket. This was recorded in a number of sources. McCann found a reference in the West Sussex Record Office which named John Boots and said he was buried on Tuesday, 31 May at Chailey. Chailey and Newick are neighbouring parishes just to the north of Lewes in East Sussex.

In June or July, the Prince of Wales' XI met Sir William Gage's XI in Hyde Park. The patrons wagered "a considerable sum". The match seems to have involved noblemen only, and so it was not an important one.

Stansted v Hertford on Wednesday, 6 July, is the earliest known match in Hertfordshire. Stansted won.

Another minor "aristocrats only" game was played Thursday, 14 July on Kew Green. The captains were the Prince of Wales and the 3rd Duke of Marlborough. The Prince of Wales XI won.

The General Evening Post on Tuesday, 2 August, announced a game at Kew Green to be played on Thursday, 4 August. The Prince of Wales was due to play, and lead a team of noblemen against London, but it was probably members of the London Club rather than its professional players, so it would have been another minor match. G. B. Buckley says it is doubtful if the match was ever played as Frederick's first child Princess Augusta (1737–1813) was born "on Aug. 3" (sic) and this occasioned "great rejoicings in London". The Prince provided beer for the populace but "one lot of it was too bad to drink". In fact, Augusta was born on Sunday, 31 July.

Hertford v Brentwood played Friday, 12 August at Ware, Hertfordshire is the second known match in the county, only five weeks after the first. Brentwood won by 6 runs for a £200 prize.

A match "betwixt the men of Kent and the Gentlemen of London, within the Bills of Mortality" was pre-announced for 27 September on Kennington Common, but no post-match report has been found.

== First mentions ==
=== Counties ===
- earliest known match definitely played in Essex
- earliest known matches played in Hertfordshire

=== Clubs and teams ===
- Essex (18th century) as a single county
- Brentwood
- Hertford
- Stansted

=== Players ===
- John Boots
- Charles Spencer, 3rd Duke of Marlborough

=== Venues ===
- Hyde Park
- Ilford (unspecified venue)
- Ware (unspecified venue)

== Bibliography ==
- ACS (1981). A Guide to Important Cricket Matches Played in the British Isles 1709–1863. Nottingham: ACS. OCLC 85045528.
- Buckley, G. B. (1935). Fresh Light on 18th Century Cricket. Birmingham: Cotterell & Co. OCLC 23450280.
- Maun, Ian (2009). From Commons to Lord's, Volume One: 1700 to 1750. Cambridge: Roger Heavens. ISBN 978-19-00592-52-9.
- McCann, Tim (2004). Sussex Cricket in the Eighteenth Century (PDF). Vol. 88. Lewes: West Sussex Record Office. ISBN 978-08-54450-55-8.
- Waghorn, H. T. (1899). Cricket Scores, Notes, &c. From 1730–1773. Edinburgh: Blackwood. OCLC 1086375331.
