= Edward Cox (cricketer) =

English cricketer and soldier

Harold Cox
Personal information
- Full name: Edward Henry Cox
- Born: 21 May 1863; Herongate, Essex, England
- Died: 23 July 1925 (aged 62); Holyport, Berkshire, England
- Batting: Unknown

Domestic team information
- Years: Team
- 1892/93–1893/94: Europeans
- 1892/93: Bombay

Career statistics
Competition	First-class
Matches	3
Runs scored	77
Batting average	25.66
100s/50s	–/–
Top score	46*
Catches/stumpings	1/–
- Source: ESPNcricinfo, 12 November 2023

Edward Henry Cox DSO (21 May 1863 – 23 July 1925) was an English first-class cricketer and British Army officer.

Cox was born in May 1863 at Herongate, Essex. He was commissioned into the British Army as a second lieutenant into the 1st Derbyshire Corps in September 1880. He was promoted to lieutenant in October 1882, at which point he was serving with the Royal Irish Fusiliers. In November 1884, he transferred to the Royal Fusiliers and was promoted to captain in March 1892. Whilst serving in British India, Cox played first-class cricket on three occasions. He made two appearances for the Europeans cricket team in the 1892–93 and 1893–94 Bombay Presidency Matches; he also made a single appearance for Bombay against Lord Hawke's touring team in December 1892. In his three matches, he scored 77 runs with a highest score of 46 not out.

Cox served in the Second Boer War, which began in October 1899, during the course of which he was promoted to major and was made a Companion of the Distinguished Service Order (DSO). He was later promoted to lieutenant colonel in May 1907 and was commanding officer (CO) of the 4th Battalion, Royal Fusiliers.

Having spent the permitted four-year period commanding a battalion, he was placed on the half-pay list in May 1911, with him retiring from active service in August of the same year.

Cox returned to service during the First World War, being made a temporary colonel in October 1914, being placed in charge of records.

Cox died suddenly at the age of 62 from heart failure in July 1925, whilst playing cricket at Holyport, Berkshire.

== See also ==
- List of fatalities while playing cricket
