= Bernie Neenan =

Australian rules footballer, born 1917

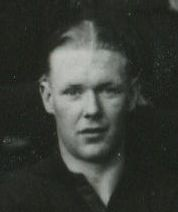

Personal information
- Full name: Bernard James Neenan
- Born: 25 September 1917; Prahran East, Victoria
- Died: 16 July 1970 (aged 52); Richmond, Victoria
- Original team: North Brunswick CYMS (CYMSFA)
- Height: 188 cm (6 ft 2 in)
- Weight: 82 kg (181 lb)

Playing career^{1}
Years	Club	Games (Goals)
1940–1942	Melbourne	8 (11)
1942	South Melbourne	3 (2)
Total		11 (13)
- ^{1} Playing statistics correct to the end of 1942.

Bernard James Neenan (25 September 1917 – 16 July 1970) was an Australian rules footballer who played for the Melbourne Football Club and South Melbourne Football Club in the Victorian Football League (VFL).

VFL clubs first became aware of Neenan while he was playing as a ruckman for North Brunswick CYMS in the CYMS Football Association (CYMSFA), run by the Catholic Young Men's Society of Victoria. He won the competition Best and Fairest in 1938 and represented Victoria in the national CYMS Carnival in Adelaide that year.

Recruited by Melbourne prior to the 1939 VFL season, Neenan was expected to make his debut that year but spent all of 1939 and most of the 1940 VFL season in the reserves, until after "showing some great form in the Seconds", made his senior VFL debut for Melbourne in Round 14, 1940, against Footscray at the Western Oval but only played once more that year, and enlisted in the Australian Army on 19 August 1940.

After five more games in 1941, Neenan played one game for Melbourne in 1942 before transferring to South Melbourne mid-season, leading a local newspaper to enthuse that Neenan might be the solution to South's lack of ruckmen.

After one game for South Melbourne's reserves, Neenan was selected at centre half forward for South's league side for their Round 15 match against North Melbourne. Neenan impressed onlookers, with The Record stating that he "fully justified himself at centre half-forward, where he brought down some nice marks, and gave a lively display."

Neenan played the next two games for South Melbourne; the Round 16 match against Melbourne and the Semi Final against Footscray, both of which South won, before being dropped for South's losing Preliminary Final against Essendon. Neenan's availability for South Melbourne in the 1943 VFL season was highlighted as an asset but while he trained for South pre-season Neenan was cut from South Melbourne's playing list in May.

Following his discharge from the Army, Neenan joined Victorian Football Association (VFA) club Williamstown.

== Personal life ==
The eldest child of Stephen and Mary Neenan, Bernie had two brothers; Paul and Frank, and sister Marie.
