= Peter Ainsworth =

British politician (1956–2021)

- Ainsworth as an MP

Shadow Secretary of State for Environment, Food and Rural Affairs
- In office 6 December 2005 – 19 January 2009
- Leader: David Cameron
- Preceded by: Tim Yeo
- Succeeded by: Nick Herbert
- In office 18 September 2001 – 23 July 2002
- Leader: Iain Duncan Smith
- Preceded by: Archie Norman (Environment); Tim Yeo (Food)
- Succeeded by: David Lidington

Chair of the Environmental Audit Select Committee
- In office 16 July 2003 – 14 December 2005
- Preceded by: John Horam
- Succeeded by: Tim Yeo

Shadow Secretary of State for Culture, Media and Sport
- In office 2 June 1998 – 18 September 2001
- Leader: William Hague
- Preceded by: Francis Maude
- Succeeded by: Tim Yeo

Opposition Deputy Chief Whip of the House of Commons
- In office 19 June 1997 – 2 June 1998
- Leader: William Hague
- Preceded by: Andrew MacKay
- Succeeded by: Patrick McLoughlin

Member of Parliament for East Surrey
- In office 9 April 1992 – 12 April 2010
- Preceded by: Geoffrey Howe
- Succeeded by: Sam Gyimah

Personal details
- Born: Peter Michael Ainsworth; 16 November 1956 Wokingham, Berkshire, England
- Died: 6 April 2021 (aged 64) London, England
- Party: Conservative
- Spouse: Claire Burnett (m. 1981)
- Children: 3
- Education: Ludgrove School; Bradfield College
- Alma mater: Lincoln College, Oxford
- Occupation: Merchant banker; politician
- Website: Official website

Peter Michael Ainsworth (16 November 1956 – 6 April 2021) was a British Conservative politician who served as Member of Parliament (MP) for East Surrey from 1992 to 2010.

Following his retirement from politics, Ainsworth was appointed UK chair of the Big Lottery Fund and, later, chairman of the Churches Conservation Trust.

== Early life ==
Ainsworth was the son of a naval officer, Lieutenant Commander Michael Ainsworth RN, and Patricia Mary Ainsworth (née Bedford, later Beeny). He was educated at Ludgrove School in Wokingham (where his father was a school master), at Bradfield College in Berkshire, and then at Lincoln College, Oxford, from which he graduated in 1979 with an MA in English Literature and Language.

On leaving university, he became a researcher to the former Conservative Member of the European Parliament, Sir Jack Stewart-Clark, and then in 1981 became a merchant banker. He worked as an investments analyst for Laing & Cruickshank Investment Management (bought by UBS in 2004) from 1981 to 1985, and then in corporate finance for S.G. Warburg Securities (bought by UBS in 1994) from 1985 to 1992, where he became a director from 1990 to 1992.

== Political career ==
From 1984 to 1986, Ainsworth was a Member of the Council at the Bow Group, a conservative think tank. He was elected as a councillor to the London Borough of Wandsworth in 1986, and at the 1992 general election, was elected to Parliament for the safe Conservative seat of East Surrey, succeeding Geoffrey Howe. He remained a Wandsworth councillor until 1994.

In 1994, Ainsworth became the Parliamentary Private Secretary (PPS) to the Chief Secretary to the Treasury, Jonathan Aitken, and in 1995 became PPS to the Secretary of State for National Heritage, Virginia Bottomley. He was promoted by John Major in 1996 to the Whips' Office. When the Major government fell the following year, he remained a whip in opposition and was promoted to Deputy Chief Whip by William Hague.

On 5 January 2010, Ainsworth announced that he was to stand down at the forthcoming general election. The Conservative majority in East Surrey was 15,921 in 2005.

=== Shadow Cabinet ===
In 1998, following his party's general election defeat the previous year, he entered the Shadow Cabinet, shadowing the Department for Culture, Media and Sport and, from 2001, the Department for Environment, Food and Rural Affairs. Ainsworth resigned from Iain Duncan Smith's frontbench for family reasons in 2002.

From 2003 he chaired the Environmental Audit Select Committee before rejoining the Shadow Cabinet under the party's new leader David Cameron in December 2005 as Shadow Secretary of State for Environment, Food and Rural Affairs. The post had heightened importance given the Conservatives' new emphasis on environmental policies under Cameron's leadership.

Speaking in March 2006, Ainsworth set out the possible new direction for Conservative policy, stating that "Achieving a sustainable world and combating the threat of climate change will require some really fresh ideas and radical thinking. We cannot expect to meet the challenges of this century by toying with the structures and technologies we have inherited from the past, and the concept of decentralised energy should be taken seriously." Ainsworth was notable as the only member of the Shadow Cabinet to have voted against the war in Iraq.

Ainsworth lost his position in the Shadow Cabinet in the January 2009 reshuffle when Nick Herbert took the post of Shadow Secretary of State for Environment, Food and Rural Affairs. From 2009 to 2010, Ainsworth was chairman of the Conservative Arts and Creative Industries Network, and from 2010 to 2012, he was chairman of the Conservative Environment Network.

== Outside Parliament ==
Ainsworth's interest in classical music and the environment was reflected in several of his roles outside politics. In 2000, he presented the six-part series Discord, Music and Dissent, about "conscience and musical creativity" on BBC Radio 4. In 2005, Ainsworth became chairman of the Elgar Foundation, a role he held until 2013.

He was a Founder Partner of the Robertsbridge Group, a sustainability consultancy, in 2010, and from 2013 to 2016, he was a trustee of the Elgar Foundation. In June 2011, following his departure from Parliament, Ainsworth was appointed chairman of the Big Lottery Fund. Ainsworth was a board member of the Environment Agency from 2012 to 2018, and from 2014 to 2016, he was a member of the London Sustainable Development Commission. He was also chairman of the Churches Conservation Trust from 2016 until he died in 2021. In 2019, he became chairman of the Heritage Alliance.

He was a Member of the Board for the wild-plant charity Plantlife from 2003 onwards, becoming chairman from 2010 to 2015. He was also a member of the Campaign to Protect Rural England, Friends of the Earth and the Surrey Wildlife Trust. Ainsworth was vice-president of the Arthur Bliss Society and a Surrey Campaign to Protect Rural England trustee from 2010 to 2011. Ainsworth was made an honorary fellow of the Chartered Institution of Wastes Management in 2010 and the Society for the Environment in 2013.

== Personal life ==
Ainsworth married Claire Alison Burnett in Hatfield in 1981, with whom he had a son, Benny Ainsworth, who became an actor, and two daughters.

According to Who's Who, he listed his recreations as "music, versifying". He was a member of the Marylebone Cricket Club and the Garrick Club. Ainsworth died in the London Borough of Hammersmith and Fulham, of a heart attack, on 6 April 2021, aged 64.

Parliament of the United Kingdom
| Preceded by Geoffrey Howe | Member of Parliament for East Surrey; 1992–2010 | Succeeded by Sam Gyimah |
Party political offices
| Preceded by Andrew MacKay | Conservative Deputy Chief Whip in the House of Commons; 1997–1998 | Succeeded by Patrick McLoughlin |
