= George Moloney (footballer, born 1924) =

Australian rules footballer

Personal information
- Full name: George Moloney
- Born: 7 March 1924
- Died: 21 April 2005 (aged 81)
- Original team: Middle Park CYMS (CYMSFA)
- Height: 183 cm (6 ft 0 in)
- Weight: 80 kg (176 lb)

Playing career^{1}
Years	Club	Games (Goals)
1943–44	South Melbourne	11 (5)
- ^{1} Playing statistics correct to the end of 1944.

George Moloney (7 March 1924 – 21 April 2005) was an Australian rules footballer who played with South Melbourne in the Victorian Football League (VFL).

His older brother Vin Moloney also played for South Melbourne.
