= Lindsay Ellis (footballer) =

Australian rules footballer

Personal information
- Born: 27 July 1935 (age 91)
- Height: 168 cm (5 ft 6 in)
- Weight: 67 kg (148 lb)

Playing career^{1}
Years	Club	Games (Goals)
1954	Footscray	1 (0)
- ^{1} Playing statistics correct to the end of 1954.

Lindsay Ellis (born 27 July 1935) is a former Australian rules footballer who played with Footscray in the Victorian Football League (VFL). His father Ted played in the VFL for Footscray and North Melbourne, and Lindsay's brother Kingsley also played in the VFL for Fitzroy.
