= Jack Meehan =

Australian rules footballer (1922–1973)

Personal information
- Full name: John Patrick Meehan
- Born: 11 December 1922; Charlton, Victoria
- Died: 10 June 1973 (aged 50); Kyneton, Victoria
- Original team: St Kilda CYMS (CYMSFA)
- Height: 180 cm (5 ft 11 in)
- Weight: 76 kg (168 lb)

Playing career^{1}
Years	Club	Games (Goals)
1946–50	St Kilda	38 (1)
- ^{1} Playing statistics correct to the end of 1950.

Jack Patrick Meehan (11 December 1922 – 10 June 1973) was an Australian rules footballer who played with St Kilda in the Victorian Football League (VFL). In the 1947 season he broke his leg after colliding with a goal post in a game against Hawthorn.

Before his football career, Meehan served in the Australian Army during World War II.

By December 1954, he was working in Prahran as a Senior Constable in Victoria Police. He later worked as a policeman in country Victoria.

Meehan married Kathleen O’Donnell at Elwood in October 1949. His best man at the wedding was his brother and St Kilda teammate Tom Meehan. One of their children is the author Kerry Cue.
