= Vin Moloney =

Australian rules footballer

Personal information
- Full name: Vincent William Moloney
- Born: 22 July 1920; South Melbourne, Victoria
- Died: 26 July 2000 (aged 80)
- Original team: South Melbourne District
- Height: 178 cm (5 ft 10 in)
- Weight: 86 kg (190 lb)

Playing career^{1}
Years	Club	Games (Goals)
1943	South Melbourne	6 (0)
- ^{1} Playing statistics correct to the end of 1943.

Vincent William Moloney (22 July 1920 – 26 July 2000) was an Australian rules footballer who played with South Melbourne in the Victorian Football League (VFL).

His younger brother George Moloney also played for South Melbourne.

Moloney enlisted in the Royal Australian Navy in July 1943 and served for the remainder of World War II.
