= Frederick Jackman =

English cricketer

Personal information
- Full name: Frederick Jackman
- Born: 15 May 1841; Fareham, Hampshire, England
- Died: 5 September 1891 (aged 50); Horndean, Hampshire, England
- Batting: Right-handed
- Bowling: Right-arm roundarm fast

Domestic team information
- Years: Team
- 1875–1877: Hampshire

Career statistics
Competition	First-class
Matches	2
Runs scored	26
Batting average	13.00
100s/50s	–/–
Top score	16
Balls bowled	52
Wickets	1
Bowling average	42.00
5 wickets in innings	–
10 wickets in match	–
Best bowling	1/21
Catches/stumpings	–/–
- Source: Cricinfo, 6 February 2010

Frederick Jackman (15 May 1841 — 5 September 1891) was an English first-class cricketer.

Jackman was born at Fareham in May 1841. He made two appearances in first-class cricket for Hampshire, against Kent at Catford in 1875, and Derbyshire at Derby in 1877. In his two first-class matches, he scored 26 runs and took a single wicket. Outside of cricket, he was by profession a watchmaker. Jackman died at Horndean on 5 September 1891, whilst playing cricket with friends. After striking the ball whilst batting right-handed, he then swapped hands to bat with his left-hand and proceeded to strike the ball once again. It was after this strike that he suddenly collapsed and died. Following a post-mortem, the cause of death was established as "syncope due to fatty degeneration of the heart, and probably accelerated by over-exertion on a full stomach". A verdict of death by natural causes was returned.

== See also ==
- List of fatalities while playing cricket
