= Terry O'Brien (footballer) =

Australian rules footballer

Personal information
- Full name: Terrance Brian O'Brien
- Born: 7 November 1918; Mordialloc, Victoria, Australia
- Died: 7 October 2011 (aged 92)
- Original team: St Kilda CYMS (CYMSFA)
- Height: 159 cm (5 ft 3 in)
- Weight: 63 kg (139 lb)
- Position: Rover

Playing career^{1}
Years	Club	Games (Goals)
1940–41	St Kilda	13 (21)
- ^{1} Playing statistics correct to the end of 1941.

Terrance Brian O'Brien (7 November 1918 – 7 October 2011) was an Australian rules footballer who played with St Kilda in the Victorian Football League (VFL).

O'Brien later served in the Royal Australian Air Force during the latter part of World War II.
