= Ian Folley =

English cricketer (1963–1993)

Personal information
- Born: 9 January 1963; Stoneyholme, Burnley, Lancashire, England
- Died: 30 August 1993 (aged 30); Whitehaven, Cumbria, England
- Batting: Right-handed
- Bowling: Left-arm seamer, left-arm spinner
- Role: Bowler

Domestic team information
- Years: Team
- 1982–1990: Lancashire
- 1991: Derbyshire

Ian Folley (9 January 1963 – 30 August 1993) was an English cricketer. He was a right-handed batsman and a left-arm bowler, initially a medium-pacer and later a spinner.

Folley started his career as a seamer in 1982, playing for Lancashire. He switched to spin bowling after coaching and encouragement from Jack Bond. Over the next two seasons, he averaged less than thirty with the ball, taking 129 wickets, and in one match, had match figures of 12/57. Lined up for an England team spot, he suffered an injury to his left arm, and quit the game, after tours to Jamaica and Zimbabwe.

In 1991 he was given a second chance, playing for Derbyshire, but his first-team performances did not live up to his earlier performances.

Two years later, playing for Whitehaven, Folley was hit underneath the eye in a freak accident while batting in a match against Workington, and was taken to local hospital for a minor operation to repair his perforated eyeball. There, while under anaesthesia, he suffered a heart attack and died. The hospital later admitted negligence. He was thirty years old.

== See also ==
- List of unusual deaths in the 20th century
- Ray Chapman, an American baseball player killed after being struck by a ball during a game; he was the only player in Major League Baseball history to die of an in-game injury
- List of fatal accidents in cricket
