= Alf Boniface =

Australian rules footballer

Personal information
- Full name: Alfred Arthur Boniface
- Born: 27 January 1917; Footscray, Victoria
- Died: 3 May 1945 (aged 28); Parkville, Victoria
- Original team: Yarraville
- Height: 170 cm (5 ft 7 in)
- Weight: 66 kg (146 lb)

Playing career^{1}
Years	Club	Games (Goals)
1940	Footscray	2 (0)
- ^{1} Playing statistics correct to the end of 1940.

Alfred Arthur Boniface (27 January 1917 – 3 May 1945) was an Australian rules footballer who played for the Footscray Football Club in the Victorian Football League (VFL).
