= Kevin Landrigan (footballer) =

Australian rules footballer, born 1917

Personal information
- Full name: Kevin James Landrigan
- Born: 18 January 1917; Rainbow, Victoria
- Died: 3 December 1982 (aged 65); Bentleigh East, Victoria
- Original team: Hopetoun
- Height: 169 cm (5 ft 7 in)
- Weight: 73 kg (161 lb)

Playing career^{1}
Years	Club	Games (Goals)
1940	Hawthorn	1 (0)
- ^{1} Playing statistics correct to the end of 1940.

Kevin James Landrigan (18 January 1917 – 3 December 1982) was an Australian rules footballer who played with Hawthorn in the Victorian Football League (VFL).

== Family ==
The son of James Michael Landrigan (1885–1922), and Elizabeth Maria Landrigan (1881–1966), née Hogan, Kevin James Landrigan was born at Rainbow, Victoria on 18 January 1917.

He married Hazel Elizabeth Laragy on 18 June 1945.

== Football ==
Cleared to Hawthorn from the Hopetoun Football Club in the Southern Mallee Football League on 5 June 1940, he played only one First XVIII game, against Fitzroy, in the last home-and-away game of the 1940 season.
