= Marvin P. Bryant =

American microbiologist and bacteriologist

Marvin P. Bryant (July 4, 1925 – October 16, 2000), also known as “Marv”, was an American microbiologist and bacteriologist, Professor in the Departments of Dairy Science and Microbiology at the University of Illinois, a member of the National Academies of Science, editor in chief of the American Society of Microbiology Publications.

Bryant was recognized as the most prominent rumen bacteriologist in the world for his seminal contributions in the fields of the ecology, physiology and metabolism of anaerobic rumen bacteria. He was also elected an honorary member of the American Society for Microbiology, the highest honor awarded by the ASM.

The National Academies Press called him "the gentle giant of rumen microbiology".

== Awards and Distinctions ==
- the Superior Service Award of the U.S. Department of Agriculture, 1959
- the Borden Award of the American Dairy Science Association, 1978
- the Paul A. Funk Award of the University of Illinois, 1979
- Procter & Gamble Award in Applied and Environmental Microbiology, 1986
- the Fisher Award of the American Society for Microbiology, 1986
- election to the National Academy of Sciences, 1987
- the Alumni Achievement Award of Washington State University, 1991
- the Bergey's Medal for Distinguished Achievement in Bacterial Taxonomy, 1996

== Career and life ==
Bryant was born in Boise, Idaho on July 4, 1925.

Bryant received a B.S. degree from Washington State University in 1949, M.S. degree in 1950 at the Professor R. E. Hungate’s laboratory, and Ph.D. from University of Maryland in 1955.
