= Brian Chirgwin =

Australian rules footballer

Personal information
- Full name: Brian Chirgwin
- Born: 22 March 1948 (age 78)
- Original team: Portarlington

Playing career^{1}
Years	Club	Games (Goals)
1966	Geelong	3 (8)
- ^{1} Playing statistics correct to the end of 1966.

Brian Chirgwin (born 22 March 1948) is a former Australian rules footballer who played for Geelong in the Victorian Football League (now known as the Australian Football League).
