= Magín Berenguer =

Asturian historian, painter and archaeologist

Magín Berenguer Alonso (25 May 1918 – 25 October 2000) was an Asturian historian, painter and archaeologist.
