= Bruce Burgess (rugby league) =

Australian rugby league footballer

Personal information
- Full name: Bruce Patrick Burgess
- Born: 1925
- Died: 24 October 2000 (aged 74–75) Peakhurst, New South Wales

Playing information
- Position: Wing
Club
Years	Team	Pld	T	G	FG	P
1950–51	St. George	15	10	0	0	30

Bruce Burgess (1925–2000) was an Australian rugby league footballer who played in the 1950s.

Former N.S.W. Country Seconds winger, Burgess joined St. George from the Waratah Mayfield rugby league club, Newcastle, New South Wales in 1950.

Burgess was frequently the Reserve Grade replacement for Ron Roberts and Noel Pidding. Burgess left the Saints at the end of the 1952 season.

Burgess died on 24 October 2000 at Peakhurst, New South Wales.
