= Keith Virtue (footballer) =

Australian rules footballer

Personal information
- Full name: Keith Virtue
- Born: 21 April 1917
- Died: 8 March 1976 (aged 58)
- Height: 174 cm (5 ft 9 in)
- Weight: 75 kg (165 lb)

Playing career^{1}
Years	Club	Games (Goals)
1940	South Melbourne	2 (3)
- ^{1} Playing statistics correct to the end of 1940.

Keith Virtue (21 April 1917 – 8 March 1976) was an Australian rules footballer who played with South Melbourne in the Victorian Football League (VFL).
