= George Moloney (footballer, born 1894) =

Australian rules footballer

Personal information
- Full name: George N. Moloney
- Born: 19 October 1894
- Died: 31 May 1959 (aged 64)
- Original team: Middle Park CYMS

Playing career^{1}
Years	Club	Games (Goals)
1917	South Melbourne	2 (0)
- ^{1} Playing statistics correct to the end of 1917.

George N. Moloney (19 October 1894 – 31 May 1959) was an Australian rules footballer who played with South Melbourne in the Victorian Football League (VFL).
