= Geoff Nicholls (footballer) =

Australian rules footballer, born 1919

Personal information
- Full name: Geoffrey Llewellyn Nicholls
- Born: 22 September 1919; Fitzroy North, Victoria
- Died: 24 September 1997 (aged 78)
- Original team: Alphington Amateurs
- Height: 175 cm (5 ft 9 in)
- Weight: 76 kg (168 lb)

Playing career^{1}
Years	Club	Games (Goals)
1940	Collingwood	2 (2)
1941–1949	Fitzroy	27 (7)
Total		29 (9)
- ^{1} Playing statistics correct to the end of 1949.

Geoffrey Llewellyn Nicholls (22 September 1919 – 24 September 1997) was an Australian rules footballer who played with Collingwood and Fitzroy in the Victorian Football League (VFL).

Nicholls also served in the Australian Army during World War II.
