= John Davis (cricketer, born 1943) =

English cricketer

Personal information
- Full name: Michael John Davis
- Born: 18 August 1943; Bolton, Lancashire, England, UK
- Died: 13 October 2000 (aged 57); Macclesfield, Cheshire, England, UK
- Batting: Right-handed
- Bowling: Right-arm fast-medium

Domestic team information
- Years: Team
- 1963: Northamptonshire
- 1961–1969: Cheshire

Career statistics
Competition	First-class
Matches	1
Runs scored	–
Batting average	–
100s/50s	–/–
Top score	–
Balls bowled	138
Wickets	2
Bowling average	29.00
5 wickets in innings	–
10 wickets in match	–
Best bowling	1/21
Catches/stumpings	1/–
- Source: Cricinfo, 16 November 2011

Michael John Davis (18 August 1943 – 13 October 2000) was an English cricketer. Davis was a right-handed batsman who bowled right-arm fast-medium. He was born in Bolton, Lancashire.

Davis made his debut for Cheshire in the 1961 Minor Counties Championship against Staffordshire. He made eight further appearances for the county in that season. He played Second XI cricket for Northamptonshire in 1962, while the following season he made his only first-class appearance for the county against Oxford University. He wasn't required to bat in this match, but did take the wickets of Rhodri Thomas and Maurice Manasseh. Leaving Northamptonshire in 1964, Davis played two Minor Counties Championship matches in 1965, one in 1968 and two in 1969.

He died in Macclesfield, Cheshire on 13 October 2000 aged 57.
