= Howard Jasper =

Australian rules footballer

Personal information
- Full name: Howard Thomas Jasper
- Born: 5 September 1919; Rochester, Victoria
- Died: 9 February 1997 (aged 77); Albany, Western Australia
- Height: 177 cm (5 ft 10 in)
- Weight: 79 kg (174 lb)

Playing career^{1}
Years	Club	Games (Goals)
1940–1941, 1946	South Melbourne	26 (3)
- ^{1} Playing statistics correct to the end of 1946.

Howard Thomas Jasper (5 September 1919 – 9 February 1997) was an Australian rules footballer who played with South Melbourne in the Victorian Football League (VFL).
