= Oswaldo Calisto Rivera =

Ecuadorian poet (1979–2000)

- Born: Oswaldo Calisto Rivera; September 22, 1979; Quito, Ecuador
- Died: October 10, 2000 (aged 21)
- Occupations: Poet, Artist
- Writing career
- Pen name: Cachibache

Oswaldo Calisto Rivera, also known as Cachibache (Quito, September 22, 1979 – October 10, 2000) was an Ecuadorian poet and artist who completed over 100 paintings. One of his poems form 2001 was titled "Rojo encanto de la marmota" or "Beware: The Marmot's Charm" in english.
