= Stan Brown (Australian footballer) =

Australian rules footballer

Personal information
- Full name: Stanley Maxwell Brown
- Born: 8 November 1921; West Melbourne, Victoria
- Died: 16 September 1984 (aged 62); Traralgon, Victoria
- Height: 177 cm (5 ft 10 in)
- Weight: 72 kg (159 lb)

Playing career^{1}
Years	Club	Games (Goals)
1940, 1944	South Melbourne	9 (4)
- ^{1} Playing statistics correct to the end of 1944.

Stanley Maxwell Brown (8 November 1921 – 16 September 1984) was an Australian rules footballer who played with South Melbourne in the Victorian Football League (VFL).
