= Rolf Ericsson =

Swedish ice hockey player

Personal information
- Nationality: Swedish
- Born: 18 November 1918 Stockholm, Sweden
- Died: 28 October 2000 (aged 81) Stockholm, Sweden

Sport
- Sport: Ice hockey

Rolf Georg Ericsson-Hemlin (18 November 1918 – 28 October 2000) was a Swedish ice hockey player. He competed in the men's tournament at the 1948 Winter Olympics.
