= Hugo Adriaensens =

Belgian politician (1927–2000)

Personal details
- Born: 18 September 1927
- Died: 30 October 2000 (aged 73)

Hugo Adriaensens (18 September 1927 - 30 October 2000) was a Belgian politician. He was a member of the Chamber of Representatives and was senator of Belgium. Adriaensens was a representative from 1974 to 1991 and substitute from 1972 to 1974.
