= Sonja Bullaty =

Czech-American photographer

Sonja Vera Bullaty (October 17, 1923, Prague, Czechoslovakia – October 5, 2000, New York) was a Czech-American photographer. Bullaty is known for her "lyrical composition" and strong use of color during her fifty-year collaboration with her husband, Angelo Lomeo. Bullaty and Lomeo's photographs appeared in LIFE, Time and Audubon magazines and journal. They have both exhibited at the Metropolitan Museum of Art, the International Center of Photography, the George Eastman House, UMPRUM Museum in Prague, in the Nikon House galleries and other venues.

== Biography ==
Bullaty was born in Prague to a Jewish banking family. Her family gave her a camera when she turned fourteen. Since Bullaty had been forced to leave school at the time, the camera was a "consolation gift." When Bullaty was eighteen, she was deported by the Nazis to Poland, where she was kept in the Lodz ghetto, and then later taken to Auschwitz and Gross-Rosen concentration camps. During a death march near Dresden, she and a friend successfully hid in a barn and were able to escape and return to Prague. When she got back to her home city, she discovered that no one else in her family had survived the Holocaust.

Bullaty, "her head shaved," saw and answered an advertisement to be the helper to Czech photographer, Josef Sudek. As his assistant, she mixed chemicals for the darkroom, organized his negatives and learned from his sense of composition. Sudek called her his "apprentice-martyr." Sudek's work often focused on the Czech landscape and windows, such as in the series The Windows of My Studio (1940-1954). Bullaty also photographed windows, but unlike Sudek, who photographed his own windows looking out, Bullaty photographed windows looking into buildings. Bullaty published a book, Sudek (1978), about her mentor, and it was the first publication of his work in the West.

A "distant relative" of Bullaty found her name on a Holocaust survivor's list and invited her to stay in New York in 1947, paying the boat fair from Europe for Bullaty. Bullaty quit working for Sudek, but they remained friends, exchanging letters over the years. Many of his letters to her were written on the backs of his photographs.

Bullaty found work with a photographer on her third day in New York. Also in 1947, she met Angelo Lomeo. They were brought together when she was inquiring about a darkroom in a building he managed. Lomeo was intrigued by Bullaty's accent and went to see her. They started photographing together a year later, traveling and sharing resources; during their time together, they became close. Bullaty and Lomeo were married in 1951. Later, when she was married, she and her husband would visit Sudek and bring him photography supplies. They visited him in Czechoslovakia "almost yearly." In 1971, she helped mount an exhibition of Sudek's work in New York.

As photographers, Bullaty and Lomeo started using studio cameras, but eventually changed to working on location with 35-mm SLR cameras. They began their career photographing artwork for museums and galleries. In addition, much of their work was originally in black and white, but they switched to color in 1970. Lomeo and Bullaty had their first photographic assignment in 1948, located in the American South. While photographing, Bullaty was grabbed by a Ku Klux Klansman and "pretended to be merely a tourist." Bullaty and Lomeo worked together on assignments all over the world. One series that Bullaty and Lomeo worked together on included windows from around the world and was featured in Popular Photography magazine. LIFE magazine featured their photos of Yugoslavian peasant-painters and their art in 1964. The couple were the first to receive the Olivia Ladd Gilliam Award from the Orion Society.

Despite working together, Bullaty had her own personal vision: she was intrigued by "Kafkaesque shadows she remembers from her childhood." She also captured the effects of climate and seasons in her landscape work. Bullaty said, "I have often felt that the reason I celebrate life and beauty is precisely because I have seen so much pain and ugliness."

Bullaty died from cancer at Memorial Sloan-Kettering Cancer Center on October 5, 2000. In 2001, Bullaty and Lomeo had 72 photographs featured in The World Trade Center Remembered.
