= Gunnar Andresen =

Norwegian footballer (1923-2000)

Personal information
- Date of birth: 5 December 1923
- Date of death: 21 October 2000 (aged 76)
- Position: Forward

International career
Years	Team	Apps	(Gls)
1947–1952	Norway	3	(0)

Gunnar Andresen (5 December 1923 – 21 October 2000) was a Norwegian footballer. He played in three matches for the Norway national football team from 1947 to 1952.
