= George Moloney (footballer, born 1939) =

Australian rules footballer and coach

Personal information
- Full name: George H. Moloney
- Born: 29 September 1939
- Died: 3 June 2017 (aged 77)
- Original team: West Coburg
- Height: 178 cm (5 ft 10 in)
- Weight: 74 kg (163 lb)

Playing career^{1}
Years	Club	Games (Goals)
1958–1961	Essendon	27 (25)
- ^{1} Playing statistics correct to the end of 1961.

George H. Moloney (29 September 1939 – 3 June 2017) is a former Australian rules footballer who played with Essendon in the Victorian Football League (VFL).

== VFL career ==
Moloney, a West Coburg recruit, made his way up through the Essendon Under-19s. Used mostly as a half forward flanker, Moloney made 27 senior appearances for Essendon, from 1958 to 1961. A knee injury suffered while playing for the seconds in 1962 ended his VFL career.

== VAFA ==
Moloney was the senior coach of Victorian Amateur Football Association (VAFA) club North Melbourne CBC Old Boys in 1977 and 1978. He then coached Old Xaverians in the 1979 VAFA season and was coach of Therry in 1982 and 1983.
