= Jack Mackenroth (American football) =

American football player (1916–2000)

Profile
- Position: Center

Personal information
- Born: June 29, 1916; Minot, North Dakota, U.S.
- Died: October 27, 2000 (aged 84)
- Listed height: 6 ft 2 in (1.88 m)
- Listed weight: 215 lb (98 kg)

Career information
- High school: Minot (ND)
- College: North Dakota

Career history
- Detroit Lions (1938)

Career statistics
- Games: 2
- Stats at Pro Football Reference

Jack Dakota Mackenroth (June 29, 1916 – October 27, 2000) was an American football player.

Mackenroth was born in 1916 at Minot, North Dakota, and attended Minot High School. He played college football at the University of North Dakota from 1935 to 1937. He received his degree in 1939.

He also played professional football in the National Football League (NFL) as a center for the Detroit Lions. He appeared in two NFL games during the 1938 season. He suffered a knee injury in an exhibition game prior to the start of the 1938 season.

In July 1939, he was hired by the University of North Dakota as the line coach for the football team, instructor of physical education, and director of the intramural winter sports program. In June 1940, he was hired as the director of physical education at Minot High School.

In approximately 1948, he became football and basketball coach at Highline High School in Burien, Washington. In 1954, he became the athletic director of the Highline Public Schools. He remained in that position for more than 20 years, as the district grew to five senior highs and nine junior highs. In 1975, he was honored as Washington's high school athletic director of the year.
