= Vin Hogan =

Australian rules footballer

Personal information
- Full name: Vincent James Hogan
- Born: 6 November 1920; Kensington, Victoria
- Died: 13 February 2001 (aged 80); Mentone, Victoria
- Height: 180 cm (5 ft 11 in)
- Weight: 76 kg (168 lb)

Playing career^{1}
Years	Club	Games (Goals)
1940, 1942	North Melbourne	7 (0)
1947	St Kilda	3 (1)
Total		10 (1)
- ^{1} Playing statistics correct to the end of 1947.

Vincent James Hogan (6 November 1920 – 13 February 2001) was an Australian rules footballer who played with North Melbourne and St Kilda in the Victorian Football League (VFL).
