= George Knott =

Australian athlete and politician

George Charles Henry Knott (19 August 1910 – 22 March 2001) was an Australian athlete and politician.

Knott enjoyed track and field athletics as a young man and joined the Collingwood Harriers Athletic Club, which had been founded in 1926. Knott excelled at walking events and over the years won a number of Victorian and Australian championships. In 1948 there was a large amount of debate over the inclusion of Knott in the 1948 Summer Olympics team for Australia. Knott had set an Australian 10,000 metres walk record at the Melbourne Showgrounds.

Knott encountered difficulties with his walking technique whilst in England prior to the 1948 London Olympics. Knott was disqualified in his walking events at the British AAA Championships and also at Birmingham. This necessitated Knott correcting his style, which left him well behind in his Games heat. During the London Olympic Games, Knott finished last in his heat of the 10,000 metres walk.

After Knott finished his competitive career he became a dedicated and hardworking official, not only for his club Collingwood but also for the State body, the Victorian Amateur Athletic Association. On 5 October 1986, Knott was honoured with the Victorian Athletic Association's highest honour, Life Membership.

Further honours came Knott's way when the athletic facility George Knott Reserve, Heidelberg Road, Clifton Hill home to the Collingwood Harriers Athletic Club and the Collingwood Little Athletics Centre, was named after Knott.

His brothers Arch and Dan both played Australian rules football in the Victorian Football League.

As a prominent Collingwood businessman, Knott served as a Collingwood City Councillor and as a Collingwood Mayor from 1963–1964. Knott was the publican of the Yorkshire Stingo Hotel in Hoddle Street for many years. In 1992 he and his wife Agnes moved into the Old Colonists' Homes in Fitzroy North.

In 2000 Knott was honoured by being selected as a torchbearer in the torch relay leading up to the Sydney 2000 Olympic Games.

George Knott died aged 90 years and 7 months in March 2001.

Government offices
Preceded by To be advised	Mayor of Collingwood; 1964–1965	Succeeded by To be advised
