= Lingfield Cricket Club =

Historical English cricket team

Representing Lingfield in Surrey, Lingfield Cricket Club was prominent in the 18th century, known to have taken part in historically important matches between 1739 and 1785. They were especially noted in the mid-1740s. According to surviving records, the club is believed to have used Lingfield Common as its home venue in the 18th century. The club has survived and its team currently plays in the Surrey County League; its home venue is Godstone Road, Lingfield.

== Matches ==
Lingfield is first recorded in June 1739, playing two matches against London. They won the first, on Monday, 18 June at an unknown venue, by two wickets. A return match was played on Wednesday, 27 June at the Artillery Ground but the outcome is unknown.

Lingfield was most prominent from 1744 to 1746. Three of its players were reported to be involved in the London v Slindon match at the Artillery Ground on Saturday, 2 June 1744. The match, which Slindon won by 55 runs, was a major event at the time and its legacy is the world's oldest known scorecard (i.e., which lists the names and scores of all players). The three Lingfield players were not specifically identified but it is possible that they included Collins of Surrey and two players called Stevens. The report says that the team included one player from Addington but there were four Addington players involved in the match and it is possible that one or more of these were connected with Lingfield: Tom Faulkner, Joe Harris, John Harris and George Jackson.

The Addington/Lingfield connection was apparent in the next two seasons when a combined team played two matches against Surrey in 1745 and one against a combined London/Surrey in 1746. The three matches were all played at the Artillery Ground. Addington & Lingfield won the 1746 match. Also in 1745, Addington and Lingfield played each other at Addington on Saturday, 3 August, but the result is unknown.

Lingfield disappeared from the sources after 1746 until Monday, 1 August 1785 when they hosted Sussex on Lingfield Common, Sussex winning by 42 runs. That is the last known reference to the Lingfield club in cricket.

== Bibliography ==
- Ashley-Cooper, F. S. (1900). "At the Sign of the Wicket: Cricket 1742–1751". Cricket.
- Buckley, G. B. (1935). Fresh Light on 18th Century Cricket. Cotterell.
- Haygarth, Arthur (1862). Scores & Biographies, Volume 1 (1744–1826). Lillywhite.
- McCann, Tim (2004). Sussex Cricket in the Eighteenth Century. Sussex Record Society.
- Maun, Ian (2009). From Commons to Lord's, Volume One: 1700 to 1750. Roger Heavens. ISBN 978-1-900592-52-9.
- Waghorn, H. T. (1899). Cricket Scores, Notes, etc. (1730–1773). Blackwood.
- Waghorn, H. T. (1906). The Dawn of Cricket. Electric Press.
- Wilson, Martin (2005). An Index to Waghorn. Bodyline.
