= Josef Felder =

German politician (1900–2000)

- Born: August 24, 1900; Augsburg, Kingdom of Bavaria, German Empire
- Died: October 28, 2000 (aged 100); Munich, Bavaria, Federal Republic of Germany

Josef Felder (24 August 1900 – 28 October 2000) was a German politician. He was one of the 94 Social Democratic members of the Reichstag who voted against the Nazi Enabling Act of 1933. He was also the last to die of the 94 who voted against this act.

He participated in the famous The Nazis: A Warning From History television series which was produced and broadcast by the BBC. His sections during the series included his experience as an opponent and political prisoner of the Nazis in Dachau, where he himself was sent.

== Biography ==
Josef Felder was born the eldest of eleven children of an Augsburg merchant family. His parents were Josef and Therese Felder. His mother died when he was seven years old. In the first years of life, the family often moved around southern Germany. After attending primary and secondary school (at the primay school, Julius Streicher was one of his teachers) he completed an apprenticeship in the graphic arts industry. He then worked first in his father’s textile factory and from 1924 to 1933 as an editor for the Swabian People’s Newspaper. In 1933, Felder first fled to Austria and from there to Czechoslovakia after the Dollfuß revolt. In 1934, he illegally returned to Germany and was arrested. Until 1936, Felder was imprisoned in the Dachau concentration camp. There he met the later SPD chairman Kurt Schumacher. He then worked until 1946 in the textile and sporting goods company of Willy Bogner senior in Munich and Oberaudorf as an accountant. Bogner, who was well acquainted with Felder's brother, had "requested" him to get him out of the concentration camp.

In 1946 Felder became publisher and editor-in-chief of The Southeast Courier in Bad Reichenhall. From 1955 to 1957 he was editor-in-chief of the SPD newspaper Vorwärts.

On 28 October 2000, Felder died in Munich at the age of 100. He was married and had two children.

== Bundestag ==
From, 1930 Felder was a city councillor in Augsburg, from 1932 he was a member of the Reichstag. Felder was one of the 94 Social Democratic Party (SPD) members of the Reichstag to vote against the Nazi Enabling Act of 1933. Of the vote on the Enabling Act, he said it was "A cynical impudence to even invite us" (German: Eine zynische Frechheit, uns überhaupt noch einzuladen), completing the trip to Berlin to vote. Following the passing of the Act, he and his SPD colleagues were outlawed and the SPD itself was banned.

Later in the Dachau concentration camp, a former Sturmabteilung member told him that they had probably been “missed” an opportunity to catch him in Augsburg. Felder was the last living member of the Reichstag from the time of the Weimar Republic. On the 4. In October 1990, he attended the first session of the reunified German Bundestag in the Reichstag building in Berlin as a guest of honour.

Felder was elected as a member of the Bundestag from 15 October 1957 to 19 October 1969.

== Publications ==
- Boldt, Boppard am Rhein 1982, pages 9 to 78, Abgeordnete des Deutschen Bundestages Band 1 Aufzeichnungen und Erinnerungen (Abgeordnete des Deutschen Bundestages) ISBN 978-3764618193
- Warum ich nein sagte. Erinnerungen an ein langes Leben für die Politik. Autobiographie, Pendo Verlag, München/Zürich 2000, ISBN 3-85842-392-0.
- Klaus G. Saur: Felder, Josef. In: Karin Peter, Gabriele Bartelt-Kircher, Anita Schröder (Hrsg.): Zeitungen und andere Drucksachen. Die Bestände des Dortmunder Instituts für Zeitungsforschung als Quelle und Gegenstand der Forschung. Klartext-Verlag, Essen 2014, ISBN 978-3-8375-1015-7, S. 456f.

== Literature ==
- Drost, 1992: die Reichstagsabgeordneten der Weimarer Republik in der Zeit des Nationalsozialismus, politische Verfolgung, Emigration und Ausbürgerung, 1933-1945: eine biographische Dokumentation (Martin Schumacher, Katharina Lübbe, Wilhelm Heinz Schröder) (ISBN 3770051831)
- Felder, Josef, in: Werner Röder, Herbert A. Strauss (Hrsg.): Biographisches Handbuch der deutschsprachigen Emigration nach 1933. Band 1: Politik, Wirtschaft, Öffentliches Leben. München: Saur, 1980, S. 169
