= Arch Knott =

Australian rules footballer, born 1916

Personal information
- Full name: Archibald Knott
- Born: 2 February 1916; Collingwood, Victoria
- Died: 16 April 1998 (aged 82)
- Original team: Victoria Brewery
- Height: 180 cm (5 ft 11 in)
- Weight: 84 kg (185 lb)
- Position: Half back / follower

Playing career^{1}
Years	Club	Games (Goals)
1938–1941, 1944	Fitzroy	37 (11)
1944–1945	St Kilda	12 (1)
Total		49 (12)
- ^{1} Playing statistics correct to the end of 1945.

Archibald Knott (2 February 1916 – 16 April 1998) was an Australian rules footballer who played for the Fitzroy Football Club and St Kilda Football Club in the Victorian Football League (VFL), the modern day Australian Football League.

Knott's brother Dan Knott also played VFL football, for Collingwood, while his brother George represented Australia at the 1948 Summer Olympics in London.
