= Caulfield Bears =

Australian rules football club

Names
- Full name: Caulfield Bears Football Club
- Nickname: Bears

Club details
- Founded: 1993; 32 years ago
- Colours
- Competition: Southern Football Netball League
- Ground: Princes Park, Caulfield, Victoria, Australia

Uniforms
Home

Other information
- Official website: caulfieldbears.com.au

The Caulfield Bears Football Club is an Australian rules football club based in Victoria, Australia. The club has competed in the Southern Football League (current "Southern Football Netball League") from 1993 to present day. This club was formed in 1993 after the merging of two clubs, St. Kevins Ormond F.C. and St Andrews Gardenvale F.C. rival clubs from the Eastern Suburban Churches Football Association (ESCFA).

The Bears have no links to the former club that played in the Victorian Football Association until the 1980s. They were initially based in the Melbourne suburb of Caulfield and wore a blue and white guernsey but now call Koornang Park in Carnegie home.

They also have a Junior club that competes in South Metro Junior Football League.

== History ==
The Caulfield Football Club was formed in 1993 after the merging of two clubs, St. Kevins Ormond F.C. and St Andrews Gardenvale F.C. Both clubs had competed in the ESCFA and their coming together coincided with the merger of the ESCFA with the Southern Football League, which changed its name from the South East Suburban FL the previous year.

St. Kevins Ormond F.C., the dominant club, was originally formed in 1946, and competed in the CYMS Football Association, winning premierships in 1948, 1952, and 1963, and then transferring to the Y.C.W. competition in 1967 and having premiership teams in 1968 and 1974. The club, church based, was one of the very few strong clubs south of the Yarra River in the seventies and eventually due to constant travelling into the northern suburbs, the club decided to move to the ESCFA for the commencement of the 1976 football season. The players were a lot happier as there was less travel and the competition was larger and more fierce.

The club started in C grade and whilst unsuccessful in winning premierships, they were runners-up in 1983 (C Grade lost to Mazenod), 1986 (B Grade lost to Box Hill Pioneers), and 1989 (A Grade lost to Donvale). With the demise of the original Caulfield F.C. in the mid eighties, many of the players and officials became associated with St. Kevins, which became very strong in the late eighties.

In the early nineties, with the imminent league merger and the waning of St Kevins as a football power, the club decided to look to Gardenvale for a merger so as to gain access to the main oval at Princes Park and to strengthen its player base.

St Andrews had been formed in 1946 as "Gardenvale East Presbyterian F.C.", and had played in the ESCFA the whole time. Whilst there had been moderate success, the club had never won a premiership. Like St Kevins there were a few grand final appearances, in 1948 (B Grade lost to Blackburn United), 1961 (B Grade lost to Hampton Methodist), 1984 (E Grade lost to Sandringham Sacred Heart) and 1987 (D Grade lost to South Dandenong), and by 1992 it was struggling to survive as a club. They had played all their football at Princes Park, mainly where the soccer currently resides.

The club moved to the main oval in the late eighties upon the demise of the original Caulfield club and it was this tenancy which assisted with the merger at the end of 1992. St Kevins however had originally played at McKinnon Oval, moving to the E.E. Gunn Reserve in the mid fifties. In 1965 the club moved to Bailey Reserve and finally to Koornang Park in 1980.

In 1992, the merged club successfully established itself at Princes Park; the new club found immediate success by winning a reserves premiership in 1993 and winning both seniors and reserves premierships in 1994 in the first division.

Since that time, ultimate success has eluded the club and it now competes in the second division in the Southern Football Netball League. Its association with the junior club which caused St Kevins' move to Koornang Park in 1980 has been successful and many current senior players have come from their ranks. In 2010 the club returned to Koornang Park to reunite with the juniors. With a full complement of junior teams, the club looks forward to gaining full strength and establishing itself as a permanent football club in the Glen Eira municipality in the twenty-first century.
