= Gardner Soule =

American writer (1913–2000)

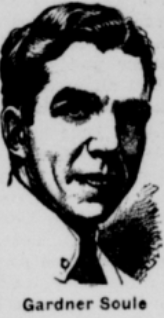
- Born: December 16, 1913
- Died: October 26, 2000 (aged 86)
- Occupation: Writer

Gardner Soule (December 16, 1913 – October 26, 2000) was an American writer known for his books on cryptozoology and marine life.

== Biography ==
Soule contributed articles to Boys' Life and Popular Science. Many of his books were aimed for younger readers.

His books on ancient mariners and oceanographic discoveries received positive reviews. However, the factual content of his works on cryptozoology was disputed. Critics described his work on alleged cryptids like the Flathead Lake Monster as entertaining, not scientific. Other reviews were more positive, describing his research on marine creatures such as the giant squid, megamouth shark and sea wasp as informative.

Soule who had spent his early life in Texas authored The Long Trail which described the history of cowboys and cattle trails. Historian Ralph Bieber wrote that the book was "disorganized, full errors, and generally unreliable." Orlan Sawey a President of the Texas Folklore Society wrote that a "major defect of the book is its historical inaccuracy."

== Publications ==
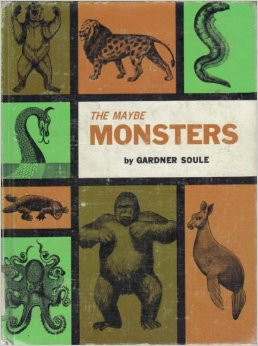
Soule's most notable book The Maybe Monsters, 1963.

- The Maybe Monsters (1963)
- Gemini and Apollo: The Next Two Projects in Space: A Preview (1964)
- The Mystery Monsters (1965)
- Sea Rescue (1966)
- The Ocean Adventure: Science Explores the Depths of the Sea (1966)
- Trail of the Abominable Snowman (1966)
- UFOs and IFOS: A Factual Report on Flying Saucers (1967)
- Undersea Frontiers: Exploring by Deep-Diving Submarines (1968)
- Under the Sea: A Treasury of Great Writing about the Ocean Depths (1968)
- Strange Things Animals Do: How Scientists Probe Their Secrets (1970)
- The Greatest Depths: Probing the Sea to 20, 000 Feet and Below (1970)
- Wide Ocean: Discoveries at Sea (1970)
- Surprising Facts About Our World and Beyond (1971)
- New Discoveries in Oceanography (1974)
- Remarkable Creatures of the Seas (1975)
- Men Who Dared the Sea: The Ocean Adventures of the Ancient Mariners (1976)
- The Long Trail: How Cowboys & Longhorns Opened the West (1976)
- Mystery Monsters of the Deep (1981)
- Mystery Creatures of the Jungle (1982)
- Antarctica (1985)
- Christopher Columbus: On the Green Sea of Darkness (1990)
