= Jack Cliff =

Australian rules footballer, born 1919

Personal information
- Full name: Jack Cliff
- Born: 23 May 1919
- Original team: West Broken Hill
- Height: 175 cm (5 ft 9 in)
- Weight: 74 kg (163 lb)

Playing career^{1}
| Years | Club | Games (Goals) |
| 1940–42 | St Kilda | 32 (8) |
- ^{1} Playing statistics correct to the end of 1942.

Jack Cliff (born 23 May 1919) is a former Australian rules footballer who played with St Kilda in the Victorian Football League (VFL).
