= Dan Knott (footballer) =

Australian rules footballer

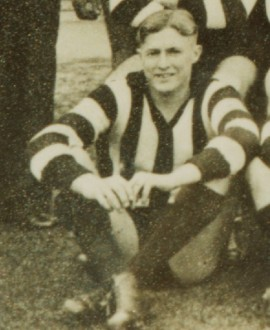
- Knott in 1941

Personal information
- Full name: Daniel Richard Knott
- Born: 20 June 1918; Collingwood, Victoria
- Died: 11 June 2014 (aged 95)

Playing career^{1}
Years	Club	Games (Goals)
1940–1941, 1943	Collingwood	18 (2)
1947	Richmond	4 (0)
Total		22 (2)
- ^{1} Playing statistics correct to the end of 1947.

Daniel Richard Knott (20 June 1918 – 11 June 2014) was an Australian rules footballer who played with Collingwood and Richmond in the Victorian Football League (VFL).

His brothers were also successful sportsmen, Arch also played in the VFL, for Fitzroy and St Kilda and George represented Australia at the 1948 London Olympic Games before becoming Mayor of Collingwood.
