= Keith McNaughton =

Australian rules footballer and boxer (1921–2000)

Personal information
- Full name: Keith Patrick James McNaughton
- Born: 20 August 1921; Richmond, Victoria
- Died: 30 May 2000 (aged 78)
- Original team: Victoria Brewery
- Height: 177 cm (5 ft 10 in)
- Weight: 72 kg (159 lb)

Playing career^{1}
Years	Club	Games (Goals)
1940	South Melbourne	1 (0)
- ^{1} Playing statistics correct to the end of 1940.

Keith Patrick James McNaughton (20 August 1921 – 30 May 2000) was an Australian rules footballer and boxer who competed professionally in both sports.

McNaughton played one senior game with South Melbourne in the Victorian Football League (VFL) in 1940. Following his football pursuits, he forged a successful professional boxing career around Australia under the name Al Moran. McNaughton fought in 23 bouts across more than six years for a 15–7 record, and was runner-up in the 1946 Victorian state welterweight title fight.

== Football career ==
As a schoolboy, at Mount Carmel College, Middle Park, McNaughton had been trained by the ex-Collingwood footballer and 1924 Stawell Gift winner Bill Twomey (who, at the time, was also the coach of the South Melbourne Seconds), and he had been captain of the school's football team.

McNaughton played for South Sydney, without a clearance from any Victorian football authority, at the age of 16, in the Sydney Football League in 1937. Because he had played in Sydney without a clearance, he was considered to be an interstate player when he returned to Victoria (in November 1937); and, under the rules of the time, was prevented from signing with a VFL (or VFL-affiliated) team for two years. McNaughton was recruited from the Victoria Brewery team for the final game of the 1940 season.

== Boxing career ==
Listed at the start of the 1941 season among the "players to train with Seconds" at South Melbourne, McNaughton gave up football and became a professional boxer, fighting as a welterweight under the name of Al Moran. In his last fight, in 1948 at the West Melbourne Stadium against Clem Sands of Newcastle, "Moran survived a torrid attack... was in an ace of being knocked out... in a dramatic last round... and won on points".

== Later life ==
In 1949, it was reported that "Al Moran has opened a grill bar and hamburger shop in Victoria Street, Richmond".

McNaughton died on 30 May 2000, at the age of 78.
