= Jerzy Otfinowski =

Polish footballer

Personal information
- Date of birth: 25 September 1907
- Place of birth: Wieliczka, Austria-Hungary
- Date of death: 4 October 2000 (aged 93)
- Place of death: Kraków, Poland
- Height: 1.82 m (6 ft 0 in)
- Position: Goalkeeper

Senior career*
Years	Team	Apps	(Gls)
1920–1924	Korona Kraków		
1924	Cracovia		
1925–1928	Podgórze Kraków		
1928–1934	Cracovia		

International career
1932	Poland	1	(0)
- * Club domestic league appearances and goals

Jerzy Otfinowski (25 September 1907 – 4 October 2000) was a Polish footballer who played as a goalkeeper.

He made one appearance for the Poland national team in 1932.
