= Lloyd Robinson (footballer) =

Australian rules footballer (1918–1967)

Personal information
- Full name: Arthur Lloyd Robinson
- Born: 10 May 1918; Benalla, Victoria
- Died: 15 August 1967 (aged 49); Prahran, Victoria
- Original teams: Baddaginnie, Snake Gully
- Height: 179 cm (5 ft 10 in)
- Weight: 81 kg (179 lb)

Playing career^{1}
Years	Club	Games (Goals)
1940	Footscray	1 (0)
- ^{1} Playing statistics correct to the end of 1940.

Lloyd Robinson (10 May 1918 – 15 August 1967) was an Australian rules footballer who played with Footscray in the Victorian Football League (VFL).
