= Tom Meehan (footballer, born 1926) =

Australian rules footballer (1926–2018)

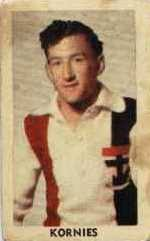

Personal information
- Full name: Thomas Francis Meehan
- Born: 31 March 1926
- Died: 19 October 2018 (aged 92)
- Original team: St Kilda CYMS (CYMSFA)
- Height: 184 cm (6 ft 0 in)
- Weight: 78 kg (172 lb)
- Position: Defender

Playing career^{1}
Years	Club	Games (Goals)
1947–52	St Kilda	73 (3)
1953–54	Fitzroy	19 (0)
Total		92 (3)
- ^{1} Playing statistics correct to the end of 1954.

Thomas Francis Meehan (31 March 1926 – 19 October 2018) was an Australian rules footballer who played with St Kilda and Fitzroy in the Victorian Football League (VFL). He later played with Brighton in the Victorian Football Association.

He served in the RAAF during the Second World War.

He married Esme Hoinville at Gardenvale in September 1949.

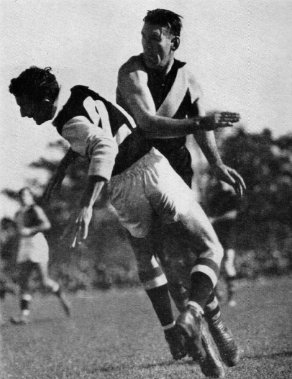
Tom Meehan of St Kilda and Jack Dyer of Richmond in a VFL match in 1949

He is depicted competing for a mark with Essendon player John Coleman in a bronze statue that was unveiled in 2006 outside the public library at Hastings, Victoria. He also appears in an iconic often-reproduced photograph with Jack Dyer of Richmond.
