= David Ananou =

Togolese writer (1917–2000)

David Kuessan ANANOU (6 August 1917 – 5 October 2000) was a Togolese writer, painter and church musician.

Ananou first worked as a teacher, but left his duties due to a serious illness in 1945. He portrayed a traditional African community in his novel The Son of the Fetish (1955), which remained his only work. As a visual artist, his work was first exhibited in Lomé, then at the Cité internationale universitaire in Paris, France. In 1954, Ananou resumed his teaching profession. He first taught in a private college until 1967, then was a French teacher and assistant director at Nyékonakpoé College. In addition, Ananou directed the choir and worked as an organist at the cathedral of Lomé.

Ananou was married and father of two children. He received the Order of the Togolan Mono in 1966 and the Order of the French Academic Palms in 1978.

.
