= Ron Carruthers (footballer, born 1943) =

Australian rules footballer

Personal information
- Full name: Ron Carruthers
- Born: 3 May 1943
- Original team: Preston Wanderers
- Height: 173 cm (5 ft 8 in)
- Weight: 69 kg (152 lb)

Playing career^{1}
Years	Club	Games (Goals)
1961	Collingwood	8 (1)
- ^{1} Playing statistics correct to the end of 1961.

Ron Carruthers is a former Australian rules footballer who played with Collingwood in the Victorian Football League (VFL).

He is the son of 1940s Collingwood player Ron H. Carruthers.
