= Reg Bell (footballer) =

Australian rules footballer, born 1913

Personal information
- Full name: Reginald Armstrong Bell
- Born: 16 September 1913; Thorpdale, Victoria
- Died: 7 August 2009 (aged 95); Bellbowrie, Queensland
- Original team: Oakleigh
- Height: 174 cm (5 ft 9 in)
- Weight: 76 kg (168 lb)

Playing career^{1}
Years	Club	Games (Goals)
1940–41	Hawthorn	23 (0)
- ^{1} Playing statistics correct to the end of 1941.

Reginald Armstrong Bell (16 September 1913 – 7 August 2009) was an Australian rules footballer who played with Hawthorn in the Victorian Football League (VFL).
