= Max Smith (footballer) =

Australian rules footballer

Personal information
- Full name: Maxwell Henry Smith
- Born: 21 December 1915; Geelong, Victoria
- Died: 27 October 1941 (aged 25); Werribee, Victoria
- Original team: Werribee South
- Height: 177 cm (5 ft 10 in)
- Weight: 78 kg (172 lb)

Playing career^{1}
| Years | Club | Games (Goals) |
| 1940 | Essendon | 7 (0) |
- ^{1} Playing statistics correct to the end of 1940.

Maxwell Henry Smith (21 December 1915 – 27 October 1941) was an Australian rules footballer who played with Essendon in the Victorian Football League (VFL).

Smith died on 27 October 1941 as a result of an injury sustained while batting in a cricket match for Werribee South two days earlier. He was struck by a ball which deflected off the bat onto his temple. The ball was bowled by his younger brother Clive Smith, who later played football for North Melbourne.
