= Ron Carruthers (footballer, born 1918) =

Australian rules footballer

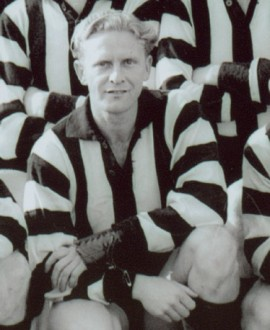
- Carruthers in 1945

Personal information
- Full name: Ronald Harold Carruthers
- Born: 26 August 1918; Collingwood, Victoria
- Died: 2 July 2004 (aged 85)
- Original team: Abbotsford
- Height: 178 cm (5 ft 10 in)
- Weight: 70 kg (154 lb)

Playing career^{1}
Years	Club	Games (Goals)
1940–1947	Collingwood	48 (3)
- ^{1} Playing statistics correct to the end of 1947.

Ronald Harold Carruthers (26 August 1918 – 2 July 2004) was an Australian rules footballer who played with Collingwood in the Victorian Football League (VFL).

== Career ==
Carruthers was a centreman and wingman, recruited locally by Collingwood, from Abbotsford. He played only briefly in his first few seasons before making 10 league appearances in 1943. His best season came in 1945 when he appeared in 17 games, which included two finals, narrow losses to South Melbourne in the semi-final and Carlton in the preliminary final. A knee injury ended his 1946 season in round six. He returned late in the 1947 VFL season, to play the last five rounds.

In 1953, Carruthers won the 75 and 100 yard sprints at the Stawell Gift. He had taken up running during his time at Collingwood, but these were the first major races that he had won.

== Family ==
He was the father of Ron E. Carruthers, who played for Collingwood in 1961.
