= Lindsay Dyring =

Australian rules footballer, born 1919

Personal information
- Full name: Lindsay Dyring
- Born: 5 January 1919
- Died: 11 September 2008 (aged 89)
- Original team: Fairfield
- Height: 175 cm (5 ft 9 in)
- Weight: 77 kg (170 lb)

Playing career^{1}
Years	Club	Games (Goals)
1940–1946	Fitzroy	45 (5)
- ^{1} Playing statistics correct to the end of 1946.

Lindsay Dyring (January 5, 1919 – September 11, 2008) was an Australian rules footballer, who played for the Fitzroy Football Club in the Victorian Football League (VFL).
