= Bill Crosling =

Australian rules footballer

Personal information
- Full name: Bill Crosling
- Born: 21 November 1918
- Died: 2 October 2000 (aged 81)
- Original team: South Footscray
- Height: 182 cm (6 ft 0 in)
- Weight: 80 kg (176 lb)

Playing career^{1}
Years	Club	Games (Goals)
1940–41	Footscray	17 (5)
- ^{1} Playing statistics correct to the end of 1941.

Bill Crosling (21 November 1918 – 2 October 2000) was a former Australian rules footballer who played with Footscray in the Victorian Football League (VFL).
