= Laurie Davies (footballer) =

Australian rules footballer (1916–2005)

Personal information
- Full name: Laurie Davies
- Born: 5 August 1916
- Died: 6 January 2005 (aged 88)
- Height: 182 cm (6 ft 0 in)
- Weight: 81 kg (179 lb)

Playing career^{1}
Years	Club	Games (Goals)
1940	North Melbourne	9 (3)
- ^{1} Playing statistics correct to the end of 1940.

Laurie Davies (5 August 1916 – 6 January 2005) was an Australian rules footballer who played with North Melbourne in the Victorian Football League (VFL).
