= Kingsley Ellis =

Australian rules footballer

Personal information
- Full name: Kingsley Ellis
- Born: 5 December 1944 (age 81)
- Original team: Blackburn
- Height: 179 cm (5 ft 10 in)
- Weight: 81 kg (179 lb)

Playing career^{1}
Years	Club	Games (Goals)
1966	Fitzroy	7 (0)
- ^{1} Playing statistics correct to the end of 1966.

Kingsley Ellis (born 5 December 1944) is a former Australian rules footballer who played with Fitzroy in the Victorian Football League (VFL).
