= Dick Chirgwin =

Australian rules footballer

Personal information
- Full name: Richard Chirgwin
- Born: 26 June 1914; Hawthorn, Victoria
- Died: 3 October 2000 (aged 86); Carrum, Victoria
- Original team: Regent's Park
- Height: 175 cm (5 ft 9 in)
- Weight: 73 kg (161 lb)

Playing career^{1}
| Years | Club | Games (Goals) |
| 1934–1939 | Richmond | 64 (4) |
| 1940 | South Melbourne | 1 (0) |
| 1940 | Footscray | 3 (0) |
| 1941–1943 | North Melbourne | 15 (2) |
| Total | | 83 (6) |
- ^{1} Playing statistics correct to the end of 1943.

Richard Chirgwin (26 June 1914 – 3 October 2000) was an Australian rules footballer who played with Richmond, South Melbourne, Footscray and North Melbourne in the Victorian Football League (VFL).

Recruited out of the Federal Football Association, Chirgwin was a half forward who joined a Richmond team which had competed in three successive grand finals. They made it four in a row in 1934, but Chirgwin, having made only one appearance that year, took no part in the finals series. Chirgwin did however play a semi final and preliminary final in 1935. He played 14 games in 1936 and would miss just two games over the next two seasons.

Chirgwin then had the unusual feat of playing with four VFL clubs in the space of two years. He played at Richmond in 1939, was with both South Melbourne and Footscray in 1940, before appearing for North Melbourne in 1941
