= Clive Smith (footballer, born 1923) =

Australian rules footballer

Personal information
- Full name: Clive Wesley Smith
- Born: 1 October 1923; Kilmore, Victoria
- Died: 18 April 1999 (aged 75)
- Original team: Werribee
- Height: 183 cm (6 ft 0 in)
- Weight: 86 kg (190 lb)

Playing career^{1}
Years	Club	Games (Goals)
1944	North Melbourne	2 (0)
- ^{1} Playing statistics correct to the end of 1944.

Clive Wesley Smith (1 October 1923 – 18 April 1999) was an Australian rules footballer who played with North Melbourne in the Victorian Football League (VFL).

He later served in the Australian Army during World War II.
