= CYMS Football Association =

Australian rules football competition (1910s–1976)

- Founded: 1910s
- Ceased: 1976; 50 years ago
- State: (Victoria (state)) Victoria

The CYMS Football Association (CYMSFA), also known as the CYMS Football League (CYMSFL), was an Australian rules football competition played in the state of Victoria. The competition was managed by the Catholic Young Men's Society of Victoria (CYMS).

== History ==
The Victorian CYMS was founded in 1892, but it would not be until the 1910 that a football competition (the CYMSFA) was established. The Port Melbourne CYMS team were the early dominate club winning the early premierships each year. Various CYMS-affiliated teams, including the Williamstown CYMS Football Club (founded in 1886), played in competitions prior to 1912.

The CYMSFA grew significantly throughout the 1930s, with a record 32 teams participating in the 1930 season. By 1933, a total of 468 CYMS members played for football clubs across the competition.

From its early years, the competition was split into two divisions, "A Grade" and "B Grade". "C Grade" was established in 1951, with all three divisions split into "North" and "South" sections throughout the 1950s.

Beginning in the 1960s, discontent continued to fester, a breakaway association was proposed and many clubs jumped at the chance. The main gripe was that there was no senior pathway for teenagers to stay at the club that they had played juniors at. The YCW wanted to establish a pathway for their juniors so a breakaway association (YCWNFA) was formed over the summer of 1962/63. This new competition took most of the clubs. 28 clubs left the CYMS to found the new association. The CYMS were left with 10 clubs.

After this, the CYMSFA's playing numbers began to decline. This continued when Williamstown CYMS moved to the Footscray District Football League (FDFL) at the end of 1964, although the club returned to the CYMSFA in 1969 after struggling to compete with FDFL clubs who were paying money to players.

In 1976, the CYMS Football Association officially disbanded. Williamstown CYMS life member Peter Buckley later recalled:

"The CYMS comp folded as a result of a fight which occurred between South Melbourne and Kensington at Debney's Paddock. The police were called and fired a gun, and basically read the Riot Act. Those two sides were suspended, and we (Williamstown CYMS) were elevated into the final four. We were knocked out in the first semi, but the competition itself soon folded as a result of turbulence and falling away in numbers. It was an old comp, but no longer had significant administration. We had to find another competition. At the time, I wanted us to join the Amateurs, but it was felt that the travel would be a disincentive to the players, so we joined the West Suburban League (WSFL)."

The competition's various clubs have since folded, merged or renamed, and as of 2024, Williamstown CYMS is the only club from the CYMSFA to still include "CYMS" in its name while competing in the Victorian Amateur Football Association (VAFA).

== Clubs ==
Club	Colours	Nickname	Former league	Est.	Seasons	Premierships		Fate
Club	Colours	Nickname	Former league	Est.	Seasons	Total	Final	Fate
Murrumbeena					1941−1954			
South Caulfield CYMS				1890s	1940s−1956			Merged with Camden in 1957 to form South Caulfield
St Kevin's Ormond					19??−19??			Moved to ESCFA, later merged with St Andrews Gardenvale in 1993 to form Caulfield
Thornbury CYMS		Bears		1930s	19??−19??			Moved to VAFA, later merged with Reservoir Rovers in 1988 to form Thornbury Rovers
West Preston		Roosters	−	1948	1948−1963			Moved to YCWFL, later merged with Reservoir-Lakeside to form West Preston Lakeside in 1998
Williamstown CYMS		CYs	−	1886	1912−1964	8	1973	Moved to WSFL in 1977 and VAFA in 1983
Williamstown CYMS		CYs	FDFL	1886	1969−1976	8	1973	Moved to WSFL in 1977 and VAFA in 1983

== Premierships ==
- 1910 Port Melbourne CYMS
- 1911 Port Melbourne CYMS
- 1912 Port Melbourne CYMS
- 1913 Port Melbourne CYMS
- 1914
- 1915
- 1916 Port Melbourne CYMS
- 1917 West Melbourne CYMS
- 1918 West Melbourne CYMS
- 1919 North Fitzroy CYMS

With the inclusion of extra clubs a "B " grade competition was started. Top team in B Grade played off against the top 3 of A Grade for premiership.

A Grade

- 1920 South Melbourne CYMS
- 1921 West Melbourne
- 1922 South Melbourne CYMS
- 1923 West Melbourne
- 1924 Richmond YCW
- 1925 Thornbury CYMS
- 1926 South Yarra

B Grade

- 1920 -
- 1921 -
- 1922 Richmond YCW
- 1923 North Fitzroy
- 1924 Thornbury CYMS
- 1925 Port Melbourne CYMS
- 1926 Middle Park

A restructure of B grade competition, split into two competitions based on demographics. In B grade top 4 from both competitions played knock out finals.

A Grade

- 1927 Ascot Vale
- 1928 Thornbury CYMS
- 1929 Northcote

B Grade East

- 1927 South Melbourne
- 1928 Williamstown CYMS
- 1929 Flemington

B Grade West

- 1927 -
- 1928 -
- 1929 -

A restructure of B grade competition, instead of East-West it was North-South. In B grade top 4 from both competitions played knock out finals until 1936

A Grade

- 1930 Flemington
- 1931 Thornbury CYMS
- 1932 Ascot Vale
- 1933 Flemington
- 1934 South Melbourne
- 1935 Clifton Hill CYMS
- 1936 Flemington
- 1937 West St Kilda
- 1938 Flemington
- 1939 Fairfield
- 1940 Essendon
- 1941 Essendon

Central

- 1944 Kensington
- 1945 East Melbourne

B Grade North

- 1930 Thornbury CYMS
- 1931 Fairfield
- 1932 South Melbourne
- 1933 Essendon
- 1934 Clifton Hill
- 1935 North Melbourne
- 1936 Carlton
- 1937 North Brunswick
- 1938 Clifton Hill
- 1939 Northcote
- 1940 East Melbourne
- 1941 Brunswick

North

- 1942 Flemington
- 1943 Moonee Ponds
- 1944 Brunswick
- 1945 Flemington

B Grade South

- 1930 -
- 1931 -
- 1932 -
- 1933 -
- 1934 -
- 1935 -
- 1936 -
- 1937 Malvern
- 1938 Glen Huntly
- 1939 Surrey Hills
- 1940 Kew
- 1941 Glen Iris

South

- 1942 Glen Iris-East Malvern
- 1943 Glen iris-East Malvern
- 1944 East Malvern
- 1945 South Caulfield

A Grade

- 1950
- 1951
- 1952 Ormond CYMS
- 1953 Brunswick
- 1954 Richmond YCW
- 1955 Richmond YCW
- 1956 Richmond YCW
- 1957 Richmond YCW
- 1958

B Grade North

- 1950
- 1951
- 1952 Moreland
- 1953 Coburg YCW
- 1954 Moonee Ponds YCW
- 1955 West Preston YCW
- 1956 Williamstown CYMS
- 1957 Thornbury CYMS
- 1958

B Grade South

- 1950
- 1951
- 1952 East Camberwell
- 1953 Elwood
- 1954 Hawthorn CYMS
- 1955 Glen Huntly CYMS
- 1956 Hampton CYMS
- 1957 East St. Kilda
- 1958

C Grade North

- 1950
- 1951
- 1952 South Yarra YCW
- 1953 Thornbury CYMS
- 1954 West Preston YCW
- 1955 Williamstown CYMS
- 1956
- 1957
- 1958

C Grade South

- 1950
- 1951
- 1952 Deepdene YCW
- 1953 Bentleigh
- 1954 Kew YCW
- 1955 South Camberwell
- 1956
- 1957
- 1958

At the end of 1958 the association reorganised into two A grades and 2 B grade competitions.

A Grade North

- 1959 Moonee Ponds
- 1960 West Brunswick
- 1961 Williamstown CYMS
- 1962 Williamstown CYMS

A Grade South

- 1959 East Camberwell
- 1960 Box Hill CYMS
- 1961 Ashburton
- 1962 Oakleigh YCW

B Grade North

- 1959 North Kensington
- 1960 West Preston CYMS
- 1961 Northcote CYMS
- 1962 East Melbourne CYMS

B Grade South

- 1959 Ashburton
- 1960 Wattle Park
- 1961 Oakleigh YCW
- 1962 East Kew

At the end of 1962 most of the clubs broke away and formed the YCWNFA.

A Grade

- 1963 Ormond CYMS
- 1964 Thornbury CYMS
- 1965 Mentone CYMS
- 1966 West Ivanhoe
- 1967 West Ivanhoe
- 1968 Mentone CYMS
- 1969 Elwood
- 1970 Williamstown CYMS A
- 1971 West Ivanhoe
- 1972 Williamstown CYMS
- 1973 Williamstown CYMS
- 1974 Heatherton CYMS

B Grade

- 1964 Mentone CYMS
- 1965 Elwood CYMS
- 1966-1970 no competition
- 1971 Wattle Park
- 1972 South Melbourne CYMS
- 1973 Mentone CYMS
- 1974 Heatherton CYMS
