= 2025 Collingwood Football Club season =

Australian Football League team season

Collingwood Football Club
2025 season
- President: Barry Carp
- Average home attendance: 67,104

The 2025 Collingwood Football Club season is the club's 129th season of senior competition in the Australian Football League (AFL). The club is fieldeding its men's reserves team in the Victorian Football League, senior women's team in the AFL Women's and reserves women's team in the VFL Women's.

Collingwood drew an average home attendance of 67,104, the highest of all Australian football clubs in the world.

== Overview ==
Collingwood's 2025 season overview
| Team | Captain(s) | Coach | Home ground | W–L–D | Ladder | Finals | Best and fairest | Leading goalkicker | Refs |
|---|---|---|---|---|---|---|---|---|---|
| AFL | Darcy Moore | Craig McRae | Melbourne Cricket Ground | 16–7–0 | 4th | Preliminary final | Darcy Cameron | Jamie Elliott (60) | |
| AFLW | Ruby Schleicher | Sam Wright | Victoria Park | 3–9–0 | 15th | DNQ | Brittany Bonnici | Kalinda Howarth (7) | |
| VFL | Sam Glover | Andy Otten | Victoria Park & AIA Centre | 11–7–0 | 7th | Wildcard Round | Harry DeMattia | Charlie West (24) | |
| VFLW | Dominique Carbone | Tom Cashin | Victoria Park | 10–4–0 | 2nd | Runner-ups | Dominique Carbone | Amelia Peck (24) | |

== Squad ==
Players are listed by guernsey number, and 2025 statistics are for AFL regular season and finals series matches during the 2025 AFL season only. Career statistics include a player's complete AFL career, which, as a result, means that a player's debut and part or whole of their career statistics may be for another club. Statistics are correct as of the preliminary final of the 2025 season (20 September 2025) and are taken from AFL Tables.

| No. | Name | AFL debut | Games (2025) | Goals (2025) | Games (CFC) | Goals (CFC) | Games (AFL career) | Goals (AFL career) |
|---|---|---|---|---|---|---|---|---|
| 1 | Patrick Lipinski | 2017 (Western Bulldogs) | 23 | 10 | 85 | 42 | 141 | 72 |
| 2 | Jordan De Goey | 2015 | 11 | 9 | 182 | 210 | 182 | 210 |
| 3 | Isaac Quaynor | 2019 | 25 | 0 | 133 | 5 | 133 | 5 |
| 4 | Brayden Maynard | 2015 | 20 | 5 | 229 | 25 | 229 | 25 |
| 5 | Jamie Elliott | 2012 | 25 | 60 | 219 | 347 | 219 | 347 |
| 6 | Tom Mitchell | 2013 (Sydney) | 4 | 0 | 36 | 8 | 207 | 84 |
| 7 | Josh Daicos | 2017 | 25 | 3 | 151 | 67 | 151 | 67 |
| 8 | Lachie Schultz | 2019 (Fremantle) | 16 | 13 | 36 | 37 | 126 | 138 |
| 9 | Dan Houston | 2017 (Port Adelaide) | 21 | 7 | 21 | 7 | 189 | 48 |
| 10 | Scott Pendlebury | 2006 | 22 | 3 | 425 | 204 | 425 | 204 |
| 11 | Daniel McStay | 2014 (Brisbane Lions) | 18 | 19 | 37 | 47 | 198 | 185 |
| 12 | Harry Perryman | 2017 (Greater Western Sydney) | 25 | 4 | 25 | 4 | 154 | 32 |
| 13 | Harry DeMattia | **** | 0 | 0 | 0 | 0 | 0 | 0 |
| 14 | Darcy Cameron | 2018 (Sydney) | 25 | 7 | 119 | 69 | 120 | 69 |
| 15 | Wil Parker | 2024 | 4 | 0 | 9 | 1 | 9 | 1 |
| 16 | Ed Allan | 2024 | 13 | 1 | 15 | 2 | 15 | 2 |
| 17 | Billy Frampton | 2018 (Port Adelaide) | 16 | 0 | 50 | 8 | 74 | 20 |
| 18 | Finlay Macrae | 2021 | 0 | 0 | 21 | 5 | 21 | 5 |
| 19 | Tew Jiath | 2024 | 0 | 0 | 1 | 0 | 1 | 0 |
| 20 | Iliro Smit | **** | 0 | 0 | 0 | 0 | 0 | 0 |
| 21 | Oscar Steene | **** | 0 | 0 | 0 | 0 | 0 | 0 |
| 22 | Steele Sidebottom | 2009 | 23 | 15 | 354 | 209 | 354 | 209 |
| 23 | Bobby Hill | 2019 (Greater Western Sydney) | 14 | 20 | 61 | 83 | 102 | 117 |
| 24 | Jakob Ryan | 2023 | 0 | 0 | 1 | 0 | 1 | 0 |
| 25 | Jack Crisp | 2012 (Brisbane Lions) | 25 | 9 | 256 | 86 | 274 | 96 |
| 26 | Reef McInnes | 2022 | 3 | 0 | 23 | 19 | 23 | 19 |
| 27 | Joel Cochran | **** | 0 | 0 | 0 | 0 | 0 | 0 |
| 28 | Tim Membrey | 2014 (Sydney) | 23 | 32 | 23 | 32 | 202 | 325 |
| 29 | Charlie West | 2025 | 1 | 1 | 1 | 1 | 1 | 1 |
| 30 | Darcy Moore (c) | 2015 | 22 | 0 | 195 | 67 | 195 | 67 |
| 31 | Beau McCreery | 2021 | 19 | 6 | 96 | 58 | 96 | 58 |
| 32 | Will Hoskin-Elliott | 2012 (Greater Western Sydney) | 18 | 12 | 190 | 156 | 242 | 198 |
| 33 | Lachie Sullivan | 2024 | 14 | 6 | 24 | 8 | 24 | 8 |
| 35 | Nick Daicos | 2022 | 25 | 17 | 95 | 63 | 95 | 63 |
| 36 | Harvey Harrison | 2023 | 0 | 0 | 16 | 14 | 16 | 14 |
| 37 | Oleg Markov | 2016 (Richmond) | 8 | 1 | 43 | 3 | 94 | 8 |
| 38 | Jeremy Howe | 2011 (Melbourne) | 19 | 0 | 171 | 23 | 271 | 103 |
| 39 | William Hayes | 2025 | 2 | 1 | 2 | 1 | 2 | 1 |
| 40 | Ash Johnson | 2022 | 0 | 0 | 27 | 36 | 27 | 36 |
| 41 | Brody Mihocek | 2018 | 22 | 36 | 159 | 267 | 159 | 267 |
| 43 | Charlie Dean | 2024 | 4 | 0 | 12 | 0 | 12 | 0 |
| 44 | Ned Long | 2024 | 25 | 7 | 32 | 9 | 37 | 10 |
| 45 | Roan Steele | 2025 | 5 | 0 | 5 | 0 | 5 | 0 |
| 46 | Mason Cox | 2016 | 10 | 4 | 139 | 127 | 139 | 127 |
| 47 | Noah Howes | **** | 0 | 0 | 0 | 0 | 0 | 0 |

=== Squad changes ===
==== In ====
| No. | Name | Position | Previous club | via |
|---|---|---|---|---|
| 12 | (New South Wales) Harry Perryman | Defender | Greater Western Sydney | free agent |
| 9 | (Victoria (state)) Dan Houston | Defender | Port Adelaide | trade |
| 28 | (Victoria (state)) Tim Membrey | Forward | St Kilda | delisted free agent |
| 27 | (New South Wales) Joel Cochran | Defender | UNSW-Eastern Suburbs | AFL national draft, third round (pick No. 47) |
| 29 | (South Australia) Charlie West | Forward | Woodville-West Torrens | AFL national draft, third round (pick No. 50) |
| 39 | (Western Australia) William Hayes | Winger | Claremont | AFL national draft, third round (pick No. 56) |
| 37 | (South Australia) Oleg Markov | Defender | Collingwood | AFL rookie draft, first round (pick No. 8) |
| 40 | (Western Australia) Ash Johnson | Forward | Collingwood | AFL rookie draft, second round (pick No. 20) |
| 45 | (Victoria (state)) Roan Steele | Midfielder | West Perth | AFL Mid-season rookie draft, first round (pick No. 8) |
| 47 | (South Australia) Noah Howes | Forward | South Adelaide | AFL Mid-season rookie draft, second round (pick No. 15) |

==== Out ====
| No. | Name | Position | New Club | via |
|---|---|---|---|---|
| 39 | (Victoria (state)) Aiden Begg | Ruck | | delisted |
| 9 | (South Australia) John Noble | Defender / Winger | Gold Coast | trade |
| 29 | (Victoria (state)) Joe Richards | Forward | Port Adelaide | trade |
| 15 | (South Australia) Nathan Kreuger | Forward | | delisted |
| 27 | (Victoria (state)) Jack Bytel | Midfielder | | delisted |
| 34 | (Victoria (state)) Josh Eyre | Defender | | delisted |
| 37 | (South Australia) Oleg Markov | Defender | | delisted |
| 40 | (Western Australia) Ash Johnson | Forward | | delisted |

== AFL season ==
=== Pre-season matches ===
Collingwood's 2025 simulation matches and AAMI Community Series fixture
| Date and local time | Opponent | Scores^{[a]} | | | Venue | Ref |
| Date and local time | Opponent | Home | Away | Result | Venue | Ref |
|---|---|---|---|---|---|---|
| Thursday, 20 February | Brisbane Lions | 5.9 (39) | 4.2 (26) | Lost by 13 points | People First Stadium [A] | |
| Thursday, 20 February | Gold Coast | 8.2 (50) | 5.2 (32) | Lost by 18 points | People First Stadium [A] | |
| Wednesday, 26 February (7:10 pm) | Richmond | 6.13 (49) | 21.6 (132) | Won by 83 points | Ikon Park [A] | |

=== Regular season ===
Collingwood's 2025 AFL season fixture
| Round | Date and local time | Opponent | Home | Away | Result | Venue | Attendance | Ladder position | Ref. |
| Round | Date and local time | Opponent | Scores^{[a]} | | | Venue | Attendance | Ladder position | Ref. |
|---|---|---|---|---|---|---|---|---|---|
| Opening Round | Sunday, 9 March (3:20 pm) | Greater Western Sydney | 15.14 (104) | 6.16 (52) | Lost by 52 points | ENGIE Stadium [A] | 19,248 | 4th | |
| 1 | Saturday, 15 March (7:35 pm) | Port Adelaide | 21.10 (136) | 6.9 (45) | Won by 91 points | MCG [H] | 63,282 | 6th ▼ | |
| 2 | Friday, 21 March (7:40 pm) | Western Bulldogs | 10.10 (70) | 10.16 (76) | Won by 6 points | MCG [A] | 78,027 | 4th ▲ | |
| 3 | Bye | | | | | | | 6th ▼ | Bye |
| 4 | Thursday, 3 April (7:30 pm) | Carlton | 8.15 (63) | 6.10 (46) | Won by 17 points | MCG [H] | 82,058 | 6th | |
| 5 | Friday, 11 April (7:10 pm) | Sydney | 16.13 (109) | 12.6 (78) | Won by 31 points | Adelaide Oval [N] | 47,649 | 4th ▲ | |
| 6 | Thursday, 17 April (7:30 pm) | Brisbane Lions | 7.11 (53) | 16.9 (105) | Won by 52 points | The Gabba [A] | 34,802 | 1st ▲ | |
| 7 | Friday, 25 April (3:20 pm) | Essendon | 16.11 (107) | 10.6 (66) | Won by 41 points | MCG [H] | 92,044 | 1st | |
| 8 | Saturday, 3 May (7:35 pm) | Geelong | 12.15 (87) | 13.12 (90) | Lost by 3 points | MCG [H] | 82,514 | 2nd ▼ | |
| 9 | Thursday, 8 May (6:10 pm) | Fremantle | 12.11 (83) | 15.7 (97) | Won by 14 points | Optus Stadium [A] | 47,780 | 2nd | |
| 10 | Saturday, 17 May (1:20 pm) | Adelaide | 11.12 (78) | 10.8 (68) | Won by 10 points | MCG [H] | 67,697 | 1st ▲ | |
| 11 | Saturday, 24 May (7:35 pm) | North Melbourne | 9.9 (63) | 15.18 (108) | Won by 45 points | Marvel Stadium [A] | 40,479 | 1st | |
| 12 | Friday, 30 May (7:40 pm) | Hawthorn | 16.11 (107) | 8.8 (56) | Won by 51 points | MCG [H] | 83,706 | 1st | |
| 13 | Monday, 9 June (3:20 pm) | Melbourne | 10.11 (71) | 11.6 (72) | Won by 1 point | MCG [A] | 77,761 | 1st | |
| 14 | Bye | | | | | | | 1st | Bye |
| 15 | Saturday, 21 June (7:35 pm) | St Kilda | 16.12 (108) | 11.8 (74) | Won by 34 points | Marvel Stadium [H] | 43,039 | 1st | |
| 16 | Saturday, 28 June (7:35 pm) | West Coast | 13.10 (88) | 8.11 (59) | Won by 29 points | Marvel Stadium [H] | 38,126 | 1st | |
| 17 | Friday, 4 July (7:20 pm) | Carlton | 8.11 (59) | 17.13 (115) | Won by 56 points | MCG [A] | 75,827 | 1st | |
| 18 | Friday, 11 July (7:40 pm) | Gold Coast | 10.9 (69) | 8.15 (63) | Lost by 6 points | People First Stadium [A] | 22,831 | 1st | |
| 19 | Sunday, 20 July (3:20 pm) | Fremantle | 11.12 (78) | 12.7 (79) | Lost by 1 point | MCG [H] | 62,198 | 1st | |
| 20 | Sunday, 27 July (2:10 pm) | Richmond | 8.9 (57) | 13.15 (93) | Won by 36 points | MCG [A] | 59,454 | 1st | |
| 21 | Saturday, 2 August (7:35 pm) | Brisbane Lions | 10.5 (65) | 14.8 (92) | Lost by 27 points | MCG [H] | 82,326 | 2nd ▼ | |
| 22 | Thursday, 7 August (7:30 pm) | Hawthorn | 17.8 (110) | 6.10 (46) | Lost by 64 points | MCG [A] | 68,515 | 3rd ▼ | |
| 23 | Saturday, 16 August (7:35 pm) | Adelaide | 9.5 (59) | 8.8 (56) | Lost by 3 points | Adelaide Oval [A] | 54,283 | 4th ▼ | |
| 24 | Friday, 22 August (7:10 pm) | Melbourne | 11.16 (82) | 11.10 (76) | Won by 6 points | MCG [H] | 60,611 | 4th | |

=== Finals series ===
Collingwood's 2025 AFL finals series fixtures
| Round | Date and local time | Opponent | Home | Away | Result | Venue | Attendance | Ref |
| Round | Date and local time | Opponent | Scores^{[a]} | | | Venue | Attendance | Ref |
|---|---|---|---|---|---|---|---|---|
| 1st Qualifying final | Thursday, 4 September (7:10 pm) | Adelaide | 8.7 (55) | 11.13 (79) | Won by 24 points | Adelaide Oval [A] | 52,187 | |
| 1st Preliminary final | Saturday, 20 September (5:15 pm) | Brisbane Lions | 11.5 (71) | 15.10 (100) | Lost by 29 points | MCG [H] | 96,023 | |
Collingwood was eliminated from the 2025 AFL finals series

=== Ladder ===
| Pos | Team | Pld | W | L | D | PF | PA | PP | Pts | Qualification |
|---|---|---|---|---|---|---|---|---|---|---|
| 1 | Adelaide | 23 | 18 | 5 | 0 | 2278 | 1635 | 139.3 | 72 | Finals series |
| 2 | Geelong | 23 | 17 | 6 | 0 | 2425 | 1714 | 141.5 | 68 | Finals series |
| 3 | Brisbane Lions (P) | 23 | 16 | 6 | 1 | 2061 | 1804 | 114.2 | 66 | Finals series |
| 4 | Collingwood | 23 | 16 | 7 | 0 | 1991 | 1627 | 122.4 | 64 | Finals series |
| 5 | Greater Western Sydney | 23 | 16 | 7 | 0 | 2114 | 1834 | 115.3 | 64 | Finals series |
| 6 | Fremantle | 23 | 16 | 7 | 0 | 1978 | 1815 | 109.0 | 64 | Finals series |
| 7 | Gold Coast | 23 | 15 | 8 | 0 | 2173 | 1740 | 124.9 | 60 | Finals series |
| 8 | Hawthorn | 23 | 15 | 8 | 0 | 2045 | 1691 | 120.9 | 60 | Finals series |
| 9 | Western Bulldogs | 23 | 14 | 9 | 0 | 2493 | 1820 | 137.0 | 56 | |
| 10 | Sydney | 23 | 12 | 11 | 0 | 1845 | 1902 | 97.0 | 48 | |
| 11 | Carlton | 23 | 9 | 14 | 0 | 1799 | 1861 | 96.7 | 36 | |
| 12 | St Kilda | 23 | 9 | 14 | 0 | 1839 | 2077 | 88.5 | 36 | |
| 13 | Port Adelaide | 23 | 9 | 14 | 0 | 1705 | 2136 | 79.8 | 36 | |
| 14 | Melbourne | 23 | 7 | 16 | 0 | 1902 | 2038 | 93.3 | 28 | |
| 15 | Essendon | 23 | 6 | 17 | 0 | 1535 | 2209 | 69.5 | 24 | |
| 16 | North Melbourne | 23 | 5 | 17 | 1 | 1805 | 2365 | 76.3 | 22 | |
| 17 | Richmond | 23 | 5 | 18 | 0 | 1449 | 2197 | 66.0 | 20 | |
| 18 | West Coast | 23 | 1 | 22 | 0 | 1466 | 2438 | 60.1 | 4 | |

Source: afl.com.au
Rules for classification: 1) points; 2) percentage; 3) number of points for
(P) Premiers

=== Awards & Milestones ===
==== AFL awards ====
- Anzac Medal – Steele Sidebottom (Round 7)
- Neale Daniher Trophy – Josh Daicos (Round 13)
- 2025 22under22 selection (captain) – Nick Daicos
- 2025 All-Australian team – Nick Daicos
- Leigh Matthews Trophy – Nick Daicos
- Lou Richards Medal – Nick Daicos

==== AFL award nominations ====
- Round 12 – 2025 AFL Rising Star nomination – Ed Allan
- 2025 All-Australian team 44-man squad – Josh Daicos, Nick Daicos, Jamie Elliott

==== Club awards ====
- E.W. Copeland Trophy – Darcy Cameron
- R.T. Rush Trophy – Nick Daicos
- J.J. Joyce Trophy – Isaac Quaynor
- J.F. McHale Trophy – Jamie Elliott
- Jack Regan Trophy – Harry Perryman
- Joseph Wren Memorial Trophy – Harry DeMattia
- Darren Millane Memorial Trophy – Darcy Cameron
- Harry Collier Trophy – Ed Allan
- Gordon Coventry Trophy – Jamie Elliott
- Gavin Brown Award – Ned Long

==== Milestones ====
- Opening Round – Harry Perryman (Collingwood debut)
- Opening Round – Tim Membrey (Collingwood debut)
- Opening Round – Jack Crisp (250 AFL games)
- Round 1 – Dan Houston (Collingwood debut)
- Round 1 – Bobby Hill (100 AFL goals)
- Round 5 – Darcy Cameron (100 AFL games)
- Round 5 – Tim Membrey (300 AFL goals)
- Round 6 – Jamie Elliott (200 games)
- Round 6 – Darcy Cameron (100 Collingwood games)
- Round 7 – Jamie Elliott (300 goals)
- Round 11 – William Hayes (AFL debut)
- Round 12 – Steele Sidebottom (200 goals)
- Round 13 – Bobby Hill (100 AFL games)
- Round 16 – Charlie West (AFL debut)
- Round 17 – Roan Steele (AFL debut)
- Round 24 – Tim Membrey (200 AFL games)

== VFL season ==
=== Pre-season matches ===
Collingwood's 2025 VFL practice matches
| Date and local time | Opponent | Scores^{[a]} | | | Venue | Ref |
| Date and local time | Opponent | Home | Away | Result | Venue | Ref |
|---|---|---|---|---|---|---|
| Thursday, 27 February (12:00 pm) | Richmond | 7.6 (49) | 20.5 (132) | Won by 85 points | Swinburne Centre [A] | |
| Saturday, 8 March (12:00 pm) | Essendon | 14.10 (94) | 8.13 (61) | Lost by 33 points | Windy Hill [A] | |
| Saturday, 15 March (12:00 pm) | Northern Bullants | 13.16 (94) | 5.5 (35) | Won by 59 points | AIA Vitality Centre [H] | |

=== Regular season ===
Collingwood's 2025 VFL season fixture
| Round | Date and local time | Opponent | Home | Away | Result | Venue | Ladder position | Ref |
| Round | Date and local time | Opponent | Scores^{[a]} | | | Venue | Ladder position | Ref |
|---|---|---|---|---|---|---|---|---|
| 1 | Saturday, 22 March (12:05 pm) | Sydney | 13.6 (84) | 8.11 (59) | Won by 25 points | Victoria Park [H] | 3rd | |
| 2 | Bye | | | | | | 9th | Bye |
| 3 | Sunday, 6 April (1:05 pm) | Coburg | 15.13 (103) | 20.7 (127) | Won by 24 points | Barry Plant Park [A] | 6th | |
| 4 | Friday, 18 April (12:05 pm) | Brisbane | 16.11 (107) | 16.10 (106) | Lost by 1 point | Brighton Homes Arena [A] | 8th | |
| 5 | Saturday, 26 April (2:05 pm) | Essendon | 12.16 (88) | 18.11 (119) | Won by 31 points | Windy Hill [A] | 5th | |
| 6 | Saturday, 3 May (2:05 pm) | Footscray | 6.6 (42) | 16.18 (114) | Lost by 72 points | Victoria Park [H] | 11th | |
| 7 | Saturday, 10 May (2:05 pm) | Northern Bullants | 12.4 (76) | 23.13 (151) | Won by 75 points | Genis Steel Oval [A] | 6th | |
| 8 | Saturday, 17 May (10:05 am) | Greater Western Sydney | 8.8 (56) | 5.15 (45) | Won by 11 points | Victoria Park [H] | 5th | |
| 9 | Sunday, 25 May (2:05 pm) | North Melbourne | 7.9 (51) | 19.9 (123) | Lost by 72 points | Victoria Park [H] | 7th | |
| 10 | Saturday, 31 May (2:05 pm) | Box Hill | 9.7 (61) | 11.12 (78) | Won by 17 points | Box Hill City Oval [A] | 5th | |
| 11 | Saturday, 7 June (2:05 pm) | Casey | 7.6 (48) | 7.15 (57) | Lost by 9 points | Victoria Park [H] | 8th | |
| 12 | Bye | | | | | | 10th | Bye |
| 13 | Saturday, 21 June (2:05 pm) | Sandringham | 14.9 (93) | 14.6 (90) | Won by 3 points | AIA Vitality Centre [H] | 8th | |
| 14 | Saturday, 28 June (12:05 pm) | Southport | 9.10 (64) | 10.13 (73) | Won by 9 points | Fankhauser Reserve [A] | 7th | |
| 15 | Saturday, 5 July (7:10 pm) | Carlton | 11.13 (79) | 12.11 (83) | Lost by 4 points | Ikon Park [H] | 8th | |
| 16 | Friday, 11 July (3:55 pm) | Gold Coast | 14.16 (100) | 15.12 (102) | Won by 2 points | People First Stadium [A] | 7th | |
| 17 | Saturday, 19 July (7:10 pm) | Geelong | 8.12 (60) | 11.9 (75) | Won by 15 points | Mission Whitten Oval [A] | 5th | |
| 18 | Saturday, 26 July (7:10 pm) | Frankston | 16.10 (106) | 10.10 (70) | Lost by 36 points | Kinetic Stadium [A] | 7th | |
| 19 | Saturday, 2 August (2:05 pm) | Williamstown | 15.7 (97) | 16.12 (108) | Won by 11 points | DSV Stadium [A] | 6th | |
| 20 | Bye | | | | | | 6th | Bye |
| 21 | Saturday, 16 August (2:05 pm) | Port Melbourne | 11.12 (78) | 10.10 (70) | Lost by 8 points | ETU Stadium [A] | 7th | |
| Wildcard Round | Sunday, 24 August (2:05 pm) | Williamstown | 9.15 (69) | 11.15 (81) | Lost by 12 points | Victoria Park [H] | —N/a | |

=== Ladder ===
| Pos | Team | Pld | W | L | D | PF | PA | PP | Pts | Qualification |
|---|---|---|---|---|---|---|---|---|---|---|
| 5 | Casey | 18 | 11 | 6 | 1 | 1743 | 1286 | 135.5 | 46 | Qualifying and elimination finals |
| 6 | Brisbane (R) | 18 | 11 | 6 | 1 | 1748 | 1605 | 108.9 | 46 | Qualifying and elimination finals |
| 7 | Collingwood (R) | 18 | 11 | 7 | 0 | 1532 | 1511 | 101.4 | 44 | Wilcard finals |
| 8 | Richmond (R) | 18 | 11 | 7 | 0 | 1365 | 1366 | 99.9 | 44 | Wilcard finals |
| 9 | Greater Western Sydney (R) | 18 | 10 | 8 | 0 | 1637 | 1443 | 113.4 | 40 | Wilcard finals |

Source: AFL.com.au
Rules for classification: 1) points; 2) percentage; 3) number of points for
(R) Club is the reserves team of a senior club of the Australian Football League

== AFLW season ==
=== Pre-season matches ===
Collingwood's 2025 AFLW pre-season fixture
| Date and time | Opponent | Home | Away | Result | Venue | Ref |
| Date and time | Opponent | Scores^{[a]} | | | Venue | Ref |
|---|---|---|---|---|---|---|
| Saturday, 26 July (9:30 am) | Essendon | | | | Windy Hill [A] | |
| Sunday, 3 August (2:00 pm) | Port Adelaide | 2.4 (16) | 3.12 (30) | Won by 14 points | Alberton Oval [A] | |

=== Regular season ===
Collingwood's 2025 AFL Women's season fixture
| Round | Date and time | Opponent | Home | Away | Result | Venue | Attendance | Ladder position | Ref |
| Round | Date and time | Opponent | Scores^{[a]} | | | Venue | Attendance | Ladder position | Ref |
|---|---|---|---|---|---|---|---|---|---|
| 1 | Thursday, 14 August (7:15 pm) | Carlton | 6.9 (45) | 3.3 (21) | Lost by 24 points | Ikon Park [A] | 8,042 | 14th | |
| 2 | Saturday, 23 August (1:05 pm) | Greater Western Sydney | 4.9 (33) | 4.1 (25) | Won by 8 points | Victoria Park [H] | Unknown | 10th | |
| 3 | Sunday, 31 August (1:05 pm) | Melbourne | 4.9 (33) | 5.7 (37) | Lost by 4 points | Victoria Park [H] | 2,794 | 11th | |
| 4 | Sunday, 7 September (3:05 pm) | North Melbourne | 8.10 (58) | 2.1 (13) | Lost by 45 points | Arden Street Oval [A] | 1,931 | 13th | |
| 5 | Saturday, 13 September (1:05 pm) | Sydney | 6.7 (43) | 2.5 (17) | Won by 26 points | Victoria Park [H] | 2,685 | 13th | |
| 6 | Saturday, 20 September (12:35 pm) | Hawthorn | 3.12 (30) | 5.9 (39) | Lost by 9 points | Victoria Park [H] | 2,067 | 14th | |
| 7 | Friday, 26 September (7:15 pm) | Western Bulldogs | 10.5 (65) | 1.2 (8) | Lost by 57 points | Whitten Oval [A] | 2,016 | 16th | |
| 8 | Sunday, 5 October (2:05 pm) | West Coast | 8.14 (62) | 2.5 (17) | Lost by 45 points | Mineral Resources Park [A] | 2,216 | 16th | |
| 9 | Sunday, 12 October (3:05 pm) | St Kilda | 5.5 (35) | 1.6 (12) | Lost by 23 points | RSEA Park [A] | 2,898 | 16th | |
| 10 | Sunday, 19 October (3:05 pm) | Richmond | 5.3 (33) | 7.4 (46) | Lost by 13 points | Victoria Park [H] | 4,057 | 17th | |
| 11 | Sunday, 26 October (3:05 pm) | Gold Coast | 3.6 (24) | 5.9 (39) | Won by 15 points | Bond University [A] | 921 | 14th | |
| 12 | Sunday, 2 November (1:05 pm) | Brisbane | 5.2 (32) | 6.16 (52) | Lost by 20 points | Victoria Park [H] | 2,032 | 15th | |

=== Ladder ===
| Pos | Team | Pld | W | L | D | PF | PA | PP | Pts | Qualification |
|---|---|---|---|---|---|---|---|---|---|---|
| 1 | North Melbourne (P) | 12 | 12 | 0 | 0 | 868 | 270 | 321.5 | 48 | Finals series |
| 2 | Melbourne | 12 | 9 | 3 | 0 | 684 | 327 | 209.2 | 36 | Finals series |
| 3 | Brisbane | 12 | 9 | 3 | 0 | 652 | 403 | 161.8 | 36 | Finals series |
| 4 | Hawthorn | 12 | 9 | 3 | 0 | 451 | 433 | 104.2 | 36 | Finals series |
| 5 | Carlton | 12 | 8 | 4 | 0 | 554 | 474 | 116.9 | 32 | Finals series |
| 6 | Adelaide | 12 | 7 | 5 | 0 | 515 | 460 | 112.0 | 28 | Finals series |
| 7 | St Kilda | 12 | 7 | 5 | 0 | 392 | 407 | 96.3 | 28 | Finals series |
| 8 | West Coast | 12 | 6 | 6 | 0 | 472 | 423 | 111.6 | 24 | Finals series |
| 9 | Sydney | 12 | 6 | 6 | 0 | 542 | 504 | 107.5 | 24 | |
| 10 | Port Adelaide | 12 | 6 | 6 | 0 | 631 | 601 | 105.0 | 24 | |
| 11 | Fremantle | 12 | 6 | 6 | 0 | 414 | 512 | 80.9 | 24 | |
| 12 | Western Bulldogs | 12 | 5 | 7 | 0 | 415 | 358 | 115.9 | 20 | |
| 13 | Geelong | 12 | 5 | 7 | 0 | 500 | 539 | 92.8 | 20 | |
| 14 | Essendon | 12 | 4 | 8 | 0 | 331 | 552 | 60.0 | 16 | |
| 15 | Collingwood | 12 | 3 | 9 | 0 | 314 | 505 | 62.2 | 12 | |
| 16 | Richmond | 12 | 2 | 10 | 0 | 349 | 583 | 59.9 | 8 | |
| 17 | Greater Western Sydney | 12 | 2 | 10 | 0 | 401 | 681 | 58.9 | 8 | |
| 18 | Gold Coast | 12 | 2 | 10 | 0 | 319 | 772 | 41.3 | 8 | |

Source: afl.com.au
Rules for classification: 1) points; 2) percentage; 3) number of points for
(P) Premiers

=== Squad ===
Players are listed by guernsey number, and 2025 statistics are for AFL Women's regular season and finals series matches during the 2025 AFL Women's season only. Career statistics include a player's complete AFL Women's career, which, as a result, means that a player's debut and part or whole of their career statistics may be for another club. Statistics are correct as of round 12 of the 2025 season (2 November 2025) and are taken from Australian Football.

| No. | Name | AFLW debut | Games (2025) | Goals (2025) | Games (CFC) | Goals (CFC) | Games (AFLW career) | Goals (AFLW career) |
|---|---|---|---|---|---|---|---|---|
| 1 | Sabrina Frederick | 2017 (Brisbane) | 12 | 3 | 54 | 14 | 92 | 34 |
| 2 | Eliza James | 2022 (S6) | 2 | 1 | 39 | 21 | 39 | 21 |
| 3 | Brianna Davey (c) | 2017 (Carlton) | 0 | 0 | 33 | 12 | 50 | 15 |
| 4 | Imogen Barnett | 2022 (S6) | 12 | 0 | 35 | 4 | 35 | 4 |
| 5 | Annie Lee | 2022 (S6) (Carlton) | 7 | 0 | 8 | 0 | 22 | 1 |
| 6 | Jordyn Allen | 2019 | 8 | 0 | 71 | 6 | 71 | 6 |
| 7 | Sarah Rowe | 2019 | 11 | 0 | 75 | 13 | 75 | 13 |
| 8 | Brittany Bonnici | 2017 | 11 | 0 | 77 | 8 | 77 | 8 |
| 9 | Alana Porter | 2020 | 7 | 4 | 62 | 10 | 62 | 10 |
| 10 | Muireann Atkinson | 2024 | 6 | 0 | 16 | 0 | 16 | 0 |
| 11 | Charlotte Taylor | 2022 (S7) | 1 | 0 | 9 | 0 | 9 | 0 |
| 12 | Georgia Knight | 2025 | 5 | 1 | 5 | 1 | 5 | 1 |
| 13 | Grace Campbell | 2020 (Richmond) | 11 | 4 | 28 | 9 | 46 | 11 |
| 14 | Mattea Breed | 2023 (Hawthorn) | 0 | 0 | 0 | 0 | 20 | 3 |
| 15 | Lily-Rose Williamson | 2022 (S7) (Essendon) | 11 | 0 | 11 | 0 | 19 | 2 |
| 16 | Ash Centra | 2025 | 8 | 6 | 8 | 6 | 8 | 6 |
| 17 | Nell Morris-Dalton | 2020 (Western Bulldogs) | 8 | 4 | 18 | 12 | 38 | 20 |
| 18 | Ruby Schleicher | 2017 | 10 | 3 | 74 | 7 | 74 | 7 |
| 19 | Georgia Clark | 2024 | 5 | 0 | 9 | 1 | 9 | 1 |
| 20 | Selena Karlson | 2019 (Western Bulldogs) | 2 | 0 | 9 | 0 | 12 | 0 |
| 21 | Amber Schutte | 2024 | 11 | 0 | 20 | 0 | 20 | 0 |
| 22 | Mikayla Hyde | 2021 (Fremantle) | 10 | 2 | 11 | 2 | 40 | 10 |
| 23 | Lauren Butler | 2019 | 12 | 0 | 61 | 5 | 61 | 5 |
| 24 | Kellyann Hogan | 2025 | 4 | 0 | 4 | 0 | 4 | 0 |
| 25 | Mikala Cann | 2019 | 12 | 2 | 76 | 15 | 76 | 15 |
| 26 | Violet Patterson | 2025 | 11 | 1 | 11 | 1 | 11 | 1 |
| 27 | Lucille Cronin | 2024 | 12 | 0 | 23 | 0 | 23 | 0 |
| 29 | Tarni White | 2020 (St Kilda) | 12 | 0 | 30 | 4 | 62 | 7 |
| 30 | Carly Remmos | 2024 | 8 | 1 | 19 | 1 | 19 | 1 |
| 35 | Kalinda Howarth | 2020 (Gold Coast) | 11 | 7 | 11 | 7 | 46 | 27 |
| 36 | Airlie Runnalls | 2022 (S6) (Fremantle) | 12 | 2 | 12 | 2 | 56 | 7 |

==== Squad changes ====
In

| No. | Name | Position | Previous club | via |
|---|---|---|---|---|
| 24 | (Republic of Ireland) Kellyann Hogan | | Waterford | rookie signing |
| 14 | (Northern Territory) Mattea Breed | Midfielder | Hawthorn | trade |
| 36 | (Victoria (state)) Airlie Runnalls | Midfielder | Fremantle | trade |
| 16 | (Victoria (state)) Ash Centra | Midfielder / Forward | Gippsland Power | AFLW national draft, first round (pick no. 1) |
| 12 | (Victoria (state)) Georgia Knight | Forward | Eastern Ranges | AFLW national draft, second round (pick no. 26) |
| 26 | (South Australia) Violet Patterson | Midfielder | Glenelg | AFLW national draft, third round (pick no. 42), Father–daughter rule selection - daughter of Stephen Patterson |
| 15 | (Victoria (state)) Lily-Rose Williamson | Midfielder | Collingwood VFLW | injury replacement |

Out

| No. | Name | Position | New Club | via |
|---|---|---|---|---|
| 12 | (Queensland) Stacey Livingstone | Defender | | retired |
| 15 | (Queensland) Erica Fowler | Forward / Ruck | | delisted |
| 16 | (Victoria (state)) Sarah Sansonetti | Defender | | delisted |
| 24 | (Victoria (state)) Lauren Brazzale | Midfielder | | delisted |
| 28 | (Victoria (state)) Charlotte Blair | Forward | | delisted |
| 14 | (Republic of Ireland) Aishling Sheridan | Forward | | delisted |
| 21 | (Victoria (state)) Eleri Morris | Forward | | delisted |
| 36 | (Queensland) Imogen Evans | Midfielder | | delisted |
| 37 | (Victoria (state)) Jordan Ivey | Forward | Collingwood VFL | delisted |
| 38 | (Victoria (state)) Sarah Ingram | Midfielder | Collingwood VFL | delisted |

=== League awards ===
- 2025 22under22 selection – Ash Centra

=== Club awards ===
- Best and fairest – Brittany Bonnici
- Best academy player – Lucy Cronin
- Players' player award – Ruby Schleicher
- Leading goalkicker – Kalinda Howarth (7 goals each)

== VFLW season ==
=== Pre-season matches ===
Collingwood's 2025 VFL Women's practice matches
| Date and local time | Opponent | Scores^{[a]} | | | Venue | Ref |
| Date and local time | Opponent | Home | Away | Result | Venue | Ref |
|---|---|---|---|---|---|---|
| Wednesday, 19 March (7:00 pm) | Geelong | | | | Deakin University Elite Sports Precinct [A] | |
| Saturday, 29 March (10:00 am) | Western Bulldogs | | | | Whitten Oval [A] | |
| Saturday, 5 April (12:00 pm) | Casey Demons | | | | Casey Fields [A] | |

=== Regular season ===
Collingwood's 2025 VFL Women's season fixture
| Round | Date and local time | Opponent | Home | Away | Result | Venue | Ladder position | Ref |
| Round | Date and local time | Opponent | Scores^{[a]} | | | Venue | Ladder position | Ref |
|---|---|---|---|---|---|---|---|---|
| 1 | Saturday, 19 April (2:35 pm) | Casey | 3.1 (19) | 7.5 (47) | Won by 28 points | Casey Fields [A] | 4th | |
| 2 | Saturday, 26 April (11:05 am) | Essendon | 10.4 (64) | 3.6 (24) | Lost by 40 points | Windy Hill [A] | 7th | |
| 3 | Saturday, 3 May (10:05 am) | Western Bulldogs | 4.2 (26) | 6.13 (49) | Lost by 23 points | Victoria Park [H] | 8th | |
| 4 | Saturday, 10 May (10:35 am) | Darebin | 3.8 (26) | 3.5 (23) | Lost by 3 points | Genis Steel Oval [A] | 8th | |
| 5 | Saturday, 17 May (2:05 pm) | Box Hill | 4.3 (27) | 3.7 (25) | Won by 2 points | Victoria Park [H] | 8th | |
| 6 | Saturday, 25 May (10:05 am) | North Melbourne | 7.4 (46) | 5.3 (33) | Won by 13 points | Victoria Park [H] | 8th | |
| 7 | Saturday, 31 May (12:05 pm) | Sandringham | 8.13 (61) | 1.2 (8) | Won by 53 points | Victoria Park [H] | 7th | |
| 8 | Saturday, 14 June (10:05 am) | Essendon | 7.5 (47) | 6.3 (39) | Won by 8 points | AIA Vitality Centre [H] | 6th | |
| 9 | Saturday, 21 June (11:05 am) | Port Melbourne | 4.2 (26) | 8.5 (53) | Won by 27 points | ETU Stadium [A] | 5th | |
| 10 | Saturday, 28 June (11:05 am) | Box Hill | 3.5 (23) | 4.10 (34) | Won by 11 points | Box Hill City Oval [A] | 5th | |
| 11 | Saturday, 5 July (10:05 am) | Carlton | 5.7 (37) | 6.5 (41) | Lost by 4 points | Victoria Park [H] | 4th | |
| 12 | Saturday, 12 July (10:05 am) | Casey | 8.9 (57) | 1.5 (11) | Won by 46 points | Victoria Park [H] | 4th | |
| 13 | Saturday, 19 July (1:05 pm) | Geelong Cats | 3.3 (21) | 9.2 (56) | Won by 35 points | Deakin University [A] | 2nd | |
| 14 | Saturday, 2 August (10:05 am) | Williamstown | 9.2 (56) | 11.3 (69) | Won by 13 points | DSV Stadium [A] | 2nd | |

=== Finals series ===
Collingwood's 2025 VFL Women's finals series fixtures
| Round | Date and time | Opponent | Home | Away | Result | Venue | Ref |
| Round | Date and time | Opponent | Scores^{[a]} | | | Venue | Ref |
|---|---|---|---|---|---|---|---|
| Qualifying final | Saturday, 9 August (2:35 pm) | North Melbourne Werribee | 4.8 (32) | 7.3 (45) | Won by 13 points | Arden Street Oval [A] | |
| Semi final | Saturday, 16 August (10:05 am) | Box Hill | 6.5 (41) | 2.4 (16) | Won by 25 points | ETU Stadium [H] | |
| Grand Final | Saturday, 30 August (3:10 pm) | North Melbourne Werribee | 4.4 (28) | 5.4 (34) | Lost by 6 points | ETU Stadium [H] | |

=== Ladder ===
| Pos | Team | Pld | W | L | D | PF | PA | PP | Pts | Qualification |
|---|---|---|---|---|---|---|---|---|---|---|
| 1 | North Melbourne Werribee | 14 | 12 | 2 | 0 | 809 | 302 | 267.9 | 48 | Finals series |
| 2 | Collingwood | 14 | 10 | 4 | 0 | 607 | 441 | 137.6 | 40 | Finals series |
| 3 | Box Hill | 14 | 9 | 5 | 0 | 637 | 415 | 153.5 | 36 | Finals series |
| 4 | Sandringham | 14 | 8 | 5 | 1 | 414 | 395 | 104.8 | 34 | Finals series |
| 5 | Williamstown | 14 | 8 | 6 | 0 | 450 | 430 | 104.7 | 32 | Finals series |

Rules for classification: 1) points; 2) percentage; 3) number of points for.

== Notes ==
Key

- H Home match.
- A Away match.
- N Neutral venue.

Notes

- **^{a}** Collingwood's scores are indicated in **bold** font.
