= Eltham Football Club =

Names
- Full name: Eltham Football Club
- Nickname(s): The Panthers

2023 season
- After finals: Premiers Division 2
- Leading goalkicker: Jason McCormick
- Best and fairest: Jesse Donaldson

Club details
- Founded: 1907
- Colours: Black and Red
- Competition: Northern Football League
- President: Michael Smith
- Coach: Tim Bongetti
- Captain(s): Darcy Vallance/Dale Sinclair
- Ground(s): Eltham Central Park
- Susan Street Oval, Eltham

Other information
- Official website: elthamfc.com.au

Eltham Football Club is an Australian rules football club in Eltham, Victoria, currently competing in the Northern Football League.

== History ==
The Eltham Football Club began playing social matches at nearby Kangaroo Ground, Diamond Creek and Greensborough from around 1904. Phil McGavin was listed as Secretary in 1904.

In 1907, Police Constable "Ike" Stephens convened a meeting with the idea of providing entertainment for the lads and an outlet for their surplus energy. .

Eltham continued to play social games however World War One saw these stop. After the return of the men in 1918-19, Eltham returned to the football field.

In 1920, the Eltham Football Club joined the Heidelberg District Football League. The team travelled by train to Ivanhoe to play their first game. Home games were played at Eltham Park, now called Eltham Lower Park.

In 1922, Eltham joined other nearby clubs Greensborough, Diamond Creek, Templestowe, Warrandyte, and Kangaroo Ground in establishing the Diamond Valley Football League.

Eltham made their first finals appearance in 1928 and won their first premiership in 1930 by defeating Heidelberg.

In 1930, Eltham Central Park was opened, although this was only used by the footballers for training until 1935, when the club formally moved their home games there and this has been the club's home ever since.

In 1935, Eltham defeated Epping in the Grand Final, but Epping lodged a protest over the eligibility of an Eltham player. A tribunal in Melbourne upheld the protest and ordered a replay. Eltham forfeited the replay and Epping was awarded the premiership.

Eltham left the DVFL to play in VFL Sub Districts League for seasons 1936 & 1937 before returning in 1938.

After five consecutive wooden spoons during the early 1960s, the club went through a golden period of four premierships in six seasons between 1969 and 1974.

Eltham Football Club was relegated to the new DVFL Second Division for Season 1981, but quickly responded with the 1982 premiership and subsequent return to the First Division. This began a trend with Eltham "yo-yoing" between the two divisions – six Second Division premierships and five First Division wooden spoons.

The 2002 Second Division premiership was the Panthers last success. After relegation in 2017 the Panthers went into the season strong favourites and won their first 15 games. On a blustery, raining day the seniors gave up a 3/4 time lead to lose on the siren to Lower Plenty. The reserves, coached by 2017 U/19 Premiership winning coach Tom Snell held on in a tough game to defeat Diamond Creek and only their 5th reserves premiership.

Season 2020 was called off due to the COVID19 Pandemic.

== Premierships ==
=== Seniors ===
(Division One)

- 1930 Eltham 7.15.57 defeated Heidelberg 7.8.50 @ Memorial Park, Greensborough
- 1932 Eltham 13.19.97 defeated Heidelberg 8.10.58 @ Warringal Park, Heidelberg
- 1949 Eltham 8.8.56 defeated Greensborough 7.6.48 @ Warringal Park, Heidelberg
- 1953 Eltham 9.16.70 defeated Lakeside Rovers 9.7.61 @ Warringal Park, Heidelberg
- 1969 Eltham 16.11.107 defeated Diamond Creek 10.12.72 @ Warringal Park, Heidelberg
- 1970 Eltham 14.13.97 defeated Diamond Creek 12.11.83 @ Epping
- 1972 Eltham 15.19.109 defeated Reservoir Lakeside 11.11.77 @ Warringal Park, Heidelberg
- 1974 Eltham 10.9.69 defeated Heidelberg 9.8.62 @ Warringal Park, Heidelberg

(Division Two)

- 1982 Eltham 15.13.103 defeated Macleod Rosanna 14.8.92 @ Nillimbik Park, Diamond Creek
- 1989 Eltham 18.11.119 defeated Epping 17.8.110 @ Warringal Park, Heidelberg
- 1995 Eltham 10.14.74 defeated West Preston 10.10.70 @ Warringal Park, Heidelberg
- 1997 Eltham 13.9.87 defeated Mernda 7.13.55 @ Warringal Park, Heidelberg
- 2000 Eltham 12.8.80 defeated Watsonia 8.6.54 @ Shelly St, North Heidelberg
- 2002 Eltham 12.9.81 defeated Mernda 7.17.59 @ Whittlesea Showgrounds,
- 2023 Eltham 12.13.85 defeated Diamond Creek 6.8.44 @ Preston City Oval. Preston

=== Reserves ===
(Division One)

- 1947 Eltham 3.6.24 defeated Diamond Creek 3.5.23 @ Warringal Park, Heidelberg
- 1971 Eltham 11.11.77 defeated Greensborough 10.8.68 @ Warringal Park, Heidelberg
- 1974 Eltham 10.13.73 defeated Templestowe 5.5.35 @ Warringal Park, Heidelberg

(Division Two)

- 2000 Eltham 13.16.94 defeated Macleod 7.12.54 @ Shelley Street Reserve, North Heidelberg
- 2018 Eltham 7.12.54 defeated Diamond Creek 5.8.38 @ Preston City Oval, Preston
- 2021 No final series due to Covid Pandemic. Awarded Minor Premiership
- 2022 Eltham 16.13.109 defeated Diamond Creek 3.8.26 @ Preston City Oval, Preston
- 2023 Eltham 18.11.118 defeated Thomastown 8.6,42 @ Preston City Oval, Preston

=== Under 19 ===
(Division One)

- 2007 Eltham 16.13.109 defeated Northcote Park 10.7.67 @ Preston City Oval
- 2017 Eltham 7.14.56 defeated Greensborough Football Club 7.10.52 @ Preston City Oval
- 2019 Eltham 13.10.88 defeated St Mary's Senior Football Club 11.14.80 @ Preston City Oval

== Honourboard ==
Year	President	Coach	Captain	B & F	Goalkicker
2023	Michael Smith	Tim Bongetti	Darcy Vallance, Jackson Wearherald	Jesse Donaldson	Jason McCormick
2022	Michael Smith	Robert Hyde	Darcy Vallance, Jackson Wearherald	Ben Montanaro	Daniel Owen
2021	Michael Smith	Robert Hyde	Anton Woods Brent Macaffer	Brent Macaffer	Michael Still
2020	Michael Smith	Robert Hyde	Anton Woods Brent Macaffer	NA	NA
2019	Michael Smith	Paul King	Anton Woods	Brent Macaffer	Michael Still
2018	Greg Wilson	Paul King	Bradyn Taglieri, Josh Merkel	Brent Macaffer	Brandon Freeman (34)
2017	Greg Wilson	Paul King	Bradyn Taglieri, Josh Merkel	Anton Woods	Brandon Freeman (19)
2016	Greg Wilson	Mario Bandera	Bradyn Taglieri, Josh Merkel	Gavan Connelly	Josh Merkel (21)
2015	Greg Wilson	Mario Bandera	Bradyn Taglieri, Josh Merkel	Bradyn Taglieri	James Kroussoratis (67)
2014	Steve Merkel	Mario Bandera	Gavan Connelly, Josh Merkel	Billy Glasgow	James Kroussoratis (53)
2013	Steven McAllister	Brett Weatherald	Paul Currie	Brad Perry	James Kroussoratis (29)
2012	Steven McAllister	Brett Weatherald	Paul Currie	Lachlan Richardson	Paul Currie
2011	Steven Merkel	Craig Hayes	Paul Currie	Gavan Connelly	Chris Burton
2010	Steven Merkel	Craig Hayes	Paul Currie	Gavan Connelly	Paul Currie
2009	Steven Merkel	Craig Hayes	Lachlan Richardson	Gavan Connelly	Paul Currie
2008	Steven Williamson	Phil Maylin	Lachlan Richardson	Chris Varsamakis	Nick Sandy
2007	Steven Williamson	Phil Maylin	Lachlan Richardson	Jai Audley	Mark Minney
2006	Dean Philpots	Phil Maylin	Lachlan Richardson	Mark Minney	Ryan Bongetti
2005	Dean Philpots	Phil Maylin	Lachlan Richardson	Adam Contessa	Ashley Dickson
2004	Dean Philpots	Phil Maylin	Lachlan Richardson	Adam Contessa	Marcus Pappa
2003	Dean Philpots	Phil Maylin	Lachlan Richardson	Mark Minney	Gavan Neville Chris Moyle
2002	Dean Philpots	Wayne Freeman	Lachlan Richardson Craig McKay	Lachlan Richardson	Luke Kennell
2001	Geoff Waddell	Grant Turnbull	Dean Philpots	Mark Minney	Jimmy Stirton
2000	Geoff Waddell	Garry Jessop	Lucas Paul Mark Minney	Lachlan Richardson	Lucas Paul
1999	Neil Halfpenny	Garry Jessop	David Brown	Mark Minney	Mark Minney John Garrard
1998	Colin Wilson	Michael Jones Ray Spratt	David Brown	Lucas Paul	Mark Minney
1997	Colin Wilson	Ray Spratt	Paul Smith	Garry Ramsay	Greg Wilson

Other highlights:

- Most no. 'A' Grade games at Eltham Football Club Harry Barrett (dec.) (263)
- Most no. Open Age games at Eltham Football Club David Brown 308
- Most no. 'A' Grade games as a player/umpire Eddie Mapperson (843).
- Winner of VFL / AFL Brownlow Medal Peter Moore 1979, 1984

== AFL / VFL footballers from Eltham Football Club ==
- Nick Coffield – Current Western Bulldogs Footballer
- Patrick Lipinski – Current Collingwood Footballer
- Lauren Brazzale – Current AFLW Carlton Footballer
- Finnbar Maley – Current North Melbourne Footballer.
- Marcus Bontempelli – Current Western Bulldogs Footballer
- Josh Caddy – Former Richmond Footballer
- David Zaharakis – Former Essendon Footballer
- Nick Vlastuin – Current Richmond Footballer
- Liam McMahon- Essendon
- Daniel Currie – Former Sydney Swans North Melbourne and Gold Coast Suns
- Adam Simpson – North Melbourne. Captain 2004 -09, Premiership's 1996 & 1999. Former Premiership Coach of the West Coast Eagles Football Club
- Andrew Dale – Melbourne in 1980s
- Matthew Ryan - Collingwood, Sydney, Brisbane
- Stephen Easton – North Melbourne & Carlton in late 1970s, early 1980s
- Darren McLaine – Collingwood in 1980s
- Alexander "Sandy" Hyslop – Collingwood in 1980s
- Peter Moore – Collingwood & Melbourne & dual Brownlow Medallist, AFL and Collingwood Hall of Fame
- John Caulfield - Richmond 1963
- Tom Butherway - Fitzroy 1937
- Jack Twyford - South Melbourne, Richmond (1932 Premiership side) & Collingwood
- Don Fraser - Richmond 1920s
