= Ron McKeown =

Australian rules footballer

Personal information
- Full name: Ron McKeown
- Born: 10 May 1967 (age 59)
- Original team: Macleod
- Height: 188 cm (6 ft 2 in)
- Weight: 96 kg (212 lb)

Playing career^{1}
Years	Club	Games (Goals)
1984–1993	Collingwood	123 (105)
- ^{1} Playing statistics correct to the end of 1993.

Ron McKeown (born 10 May 1967) is a former Australian rules footballer who played with Collingwood in the Victorian/Australian Football League (VFL/AFL).

McKeown, originally from Macleod, was just 17 when he made his VFL debut in 1984 and finished the year in a losing preliminary final side. A full-back, he was often used with success up forward and in a game against Essendon in 1986 he kicked eight goals at Waverley Park.

Although he had made 20 appearances in 1990, McKeown didn't play in Collingwood's semi final win and wasn't able to force his way back into the team for the grand final.

He took time away from the game during the 1991 season after his twins, who were born prematurely, died but still played 18 rounds.

In the 1992 elimination final he kicked five goals however Collingwood were defeated by St Kilda. McKeown finished the season with 29 goals from just 13 games.

His VFL career ended after the 1993 season but he continued playing football and was the leading goal-kicker in the second division of the Diamond Valley Football League in 1999, with 114 goals for Whittlesea.

McKeown was also a talented cricketer. He played with Bellfield Cricket Club in the HDCA, captaining and coaching the club to A Grade success. His career spanned from 1980 to 2001, amassing 6242 runs at 40.27 with 13 centuries. He was also more than handy with the ball, taking 149 wickets at 22.60.
