= Sandy Hyslop =

Australian rules footballer

Personal information
- Born: 30 May 1964 (age 62)
- Original team: Eltham
- Height: 185 cm (6 ft 1 in)
- Weight: 77 kg (170 lb)

Playing career^{1}
Years	Club	Games (Goals)
1986	Collingwood	1 (0)
- ^{1} Playing statistics correct to the end of 1986.

Sandy Hyslop (born 30 May 1964) is a former Australian rules footballer who played with Collingwood in the Victorian Football League (VFL).

Hyslop was a half back flanker, originally from Eltham, where he was a premiership player in 1982.

His only league game came in Collingwood's Round 16 win over Fitzroy at Waverley Park in the 1986 VFL season.

He had a stint in the Victorian Football Association with Brunswick, but would return to Eltham and win a best and fairest in 1991.
