= Paul Tilley =

Australian rules footballer

Personal information
- Full name: Paul Lawrence Tilley
- Born: 3 July 1964 (age 62)
- Original team: West Preston (DVFL
- Height: 194 cm (6 ft 4 in)
- Weight: 81 kg (179 lb)

Playing career^{1}
Years	Club	Games (Goals)
1985–1986	Fitzroy	13 (1)
1987	St Kilda	2 (0)
Total		15 (1)
- ^{1} Playing statistics correct to the end of 1987.

Paul Lawrence Tilley (born 3 July 1964) is a former Australian rules footballer who played with Fitzroy and St Kilda in the Victorian Football League (VFL) during the 1980s.

Tilley was originally from West Preston and played Under-19s football for Fitzroy. He broke into the seniors for the first time in 1985 when he made four appearances. The following season he played in the first seven rounds and finished the year with nine games.

At St Kilda in 1987, he had to wait until round 21 to play a senior game, coming into the side to replace ruckman Warwick Green.

Tilley played with Wangaratta in the Ovens & Murray Football League in 1988, kicking 10 goals for the season, with Wangaratta finishing 4th.

He returned to his original club West Preston in 1989 and in 1992 won the George LeBrocq Medal, given to the best and fairest player in the Diamond Valley Football League second division.

Tilley later turned to coaching and was put in charge Heathcote District Football League club Broadford. During his tenure, in 2004, he was playing a reserves game against North Bendigo and struck his opponent Travis Lomas, causing various facial injuries. The league suspended him for the remainder of the year as well as the entire 2005 season. He was also charged in court and in 2006 he was sentenced to 18 months imprisonment, 12 of them suspended, having been found guilty of "intentionally causing serious injury" to Travis Lomas.

He returned to football after the end of his sentence and spent time as coach of both North Heidelberg and Broadford. In 2010 he coached the latter to a grand final and the following season joined Lancefield as coach.
