= West Preston Lakeside Football Club =

West Preston Lakeside

Names
- Full name: West Preston Lakeside Football Club Inc
- Nickname: Roosters

2024 season
- After finals: NFNL: N/A; NFNLW: 3rd
- Home-and-away season: NFNL: 7th NFNLW: 1st

Club details
- Founded: 23 March 1998; 28 years ago
- Colours: Blue White Red
- Premierships: DVFL/NFL/NFNL (3): 2003; 2010; 2018
- Ground: J. E. Moore Park

Other information
- Official website: westprestonlakesidefc.com.au

The West Preston Lakeside Football Club, nicknamed the Roosters, is an Australian rules football club based in the Melbourne suburb of Reservoir. It was formed following a merger between West Preston and Reservoir-Lakeside in 1998.

As of 2024, the club's men's team competes in currently competing in Division 1 of the Northern Football Netball League (NFNL), while the women's team competes in Division 2 of the NFNL Women's. The club also fields junior and netball teams.

== History ==
=== West Preston ===
The West Preston Football Club, nicknamed the Roosters, was formed in 1948 and entered the CYMS Football Association. It remained there until 1963, when it joined the YCW Football League. The club fielded a number of junior teams, with more than 10 junior players going onto play in the Victorian Football League (VFL, now AFL).

In 1981, as the club continued to grow, West Preston successfully applied to enter the Diamond Valley Football League (DVFL).

=== Reservoir-Lakeside ===
The Reservoir-Lakeside Football Club, nicknamed the Lakies, was formed in 1947 and entered the DVFL the same year. It won a Division 1 senior premiership in 1965 − going on to win two more in 1975 and 1977 − while also winning sixteen reserves and thirds premierships.

=== Merged club ===
On 23 March 1998, members of West Preston and Reservoir-Lakeside met and voted on a proposal to merge the clubs. By this point, Reservoir-Lakeside was struggling to field teams. The proposal passed, and the merged club entered the DVFL for the 1998 season.

The merged club had immediate success, missing out on the finals series by only one game in its first season. It won the minor premiership in 2000, but was defeated by Northcote Park in the grand final. The first premiership came in 2003 with a victory over Montmorency.

A second premiership was won in 2010 with a victory over Heidelberg, who had won the past four premierships. In 2018, West Preston Lakeside became the first NFL club to win men's and women's premierships in the same season, with grand final victories over Macleod and Montmorency respectively.

== Seasons ==
=== Men's ===
==== Seniors ====
Season	Coach	Captain	Best & Fairest	Leading Goalkicker
2013	Frankie Raso	Shaun Gannon		Alex Gleeson (30)
2011	Vin Datoli			Glenn Robertson (45)
2010	Vin Datoli	Nick Meese		Glenn Robertson
2009	Vin Datoli	Damian Smith	Jake Williams	Billy Morrison
2008	Matthew Larkin	Damian Smith	Daniel McFerran	Billy Morrison – 41
2007	Matthew Larkin	Fabian Carelli	Andrew Gill	Scott Nugent – 38
2006	Paul Tilley	Fabian Carelli	Daniel McFerran	Adrian Baker – 73
			Scott Nugent	
2005	Ryan Smith	Fabian Carelli	Fabian Carelli	
2004	Ryan Smith	Fabian Carelli	Robbie Maiorana	Dean Grainger – 42
2003	Ryan Smith	Fabian Carelli	David Snow	Chris Groom – 65
2002	David Snow	Fabian Carelli	Dale Carmody	Jason McGann – 36
2001	Grant Lawrie	Dale Carmody	Jason McGann	Chris Groom – 34
2000	Grant Turnbull	Dale Carmody	Robbie Maiorana	Bassman Abdul-Wahed – 53
1999	Grant Turnbull	Dale Carmody	Robbie Maiorana	Heath Shephard – 68
1998	Grant Turnbull	Heath Shephard	Jason McGann	Heath Shephard – 61

=== Seniors (West Preston) ===
Season	Coach	Captain	Best & Fairest	Leading Goalkicker
1997	Jarrod O'Niell	Jarrod O'Niell	Dale Carmody	Adrian Baker – 43
1996	Harold Martin	Adam Bruni	Dale Carmody	Adam McKay – 79
1995	Harold Martin	Adam Bruni	Dale Carmody	David Miller – 85
1994	Andrew Smith	Pat Fitzgerald	Dino Senno	Heath Shephard – 47
1993	Andrew Smith	Pat Fitzgerald	Adam Bruni	Nick Murphy – 92
1992	Andrew Smith	Pat Fitzgerald	Paul Tilley	Cristian Brandt – 68
1991	Greg Fyffe	Greg Fyffe	Grant Bueno	David Miller – 61
1990	Greg Fyffe	Greg Fyffe	Greg Fyffe	Billy Loughron – 83
1989	Mark Duckworth	Phil Crapper	David Owen	
1988	Mark Duckworth	Phil Crapper	Daryl Delos	David Miller – 72
1987	Mark Duckworth	Phil Crapper	Greg Fyffe	
1986	Kevin Currie	Kevin Currie	Adrian Sullivan	David Miller – 81
1985	Laurie Tilley		Phil Crapper	Steve Banbury – 55
1984	Mick Mulvahill		Adrian Sullivan	Steve Banbury – 56
1983	Mick Mulvahill		Steve Banbury	Steve Banbury – 76
1982				

=== Grand Finals ===
Senior Premierships
2003	DVFL – Division 1	West Preston Lakeside 13. 9. 87 defeated Montmorency 9. 7. 61
2010	NFL – Division 1	West Preston Lakeside 13. 9. 87 defeated Heidelberg 9. 12. 66
Reserves Premierships
2012	NFL – Division 1	West Preston Lakeside 18. 12. 120 defeated Montmorency 7. 5. 47
2014	NFL – Division 1	West Preston Lakeside 7. 13. 55 defeated Greensborough 8. 6. 54
Thirds Premierships
2006	DVFL – Division 1	West Preston Lakeside defeated Bundoora
2008	NFL – Division 1	West Preston Lakeside 8. 13. 61 defeated Bundoora 6. 9. 45
2013	NFL – Division 1	West Preston Lakeside 6. 7. 43 defeated Greensborough 5. 12. 42

==== Grand finals (West Preston) ====
Senior Premierships
1996	DVFL – Division 2	West Preston 8. 6. 54 defeated Mernda 7. 11. 53
1993	DVFL – Division 2	West Preston 30. 16. 196 defeated Reservoir 11. 7. 73
1988	DVFL – Division 2	West Preston 12. 13. 85 defeated Epping 8. 5. 53
1968	YCW – "A" Grade	
Reserves Premierships
1996	DVFL – Division 2	West Preston 12. 7. 79 defeated Diamond Creek 5. 4. 34
1995	DVFL – Division 2	West Preston 20. 13. 133 defeated Heidelberg West 5. 12. 42
1993	DVFL – Division 2	West Preston 27. 16. 178 defeated Reservoir 9. 7. 61
1992	DVFL – Division 2	West Preston 6. 7. 43 defeated Diamond Creek 5. 4. 34
1991	DVFL – Division 2	West Preston 14. 20. 104 defeated Research 7. 12. 54
1985	DVFL – Division 2	West Preston 14. 14. 98 defeated Reservoir Lakeside 11. 12. 78
Thirds Premierships
1986	DVFL – Division 2	West Preston 9. 11. 65 defeated Thornbury 7. 10. 52
1978	PDJFA	

==== Grand finals (Reservoir-Lakeside) ====
Senior Premierships
1977	DVFL – Division 1	Reservoir Lakeside 14. 4. 88 defeated Montmorency 7. 9. 51
1975	DVFL – Division 1	Reservoir Lakeside 13. 15. 93 defeated Heidelberg 9. 11. 65
1965	DVFL – Division 1	Reservoir Lakeside 13. 7. 85 defeated Greensborough 7. 9. 51
Reserves Premierships
1987	DVFL – Division 2	Reservoir Lakeside 21. 7. 133 defeated Watsonia 6. 10. 46
1986	DVFL – Division 2	Reservoir Lakeside 16. 10. 106 defeated Reservoir 12. 8. 80
1978	DVFL – Division 1	Reservoir Lakeside 17. 16. 118 defeated North Heidelberg 6. 10. 46
1975	DVFL – Division 1	
1970	DVFL – Division 1	
1969	DVFL – Division 1	
1966	DVFL – Division 1	
1965	DVFL – Division 1	
Thirds Premierships
1992	DVFL – Division 1	Reservoir-Lakeside 5. 10. 40 defeated Greensborough 1. 5. 11
1985	DVFL – Division 2	Reservoir-Lakeside 11. 9. 75 defeated Thornbury 9. 4. 58
1978	DVFL – Division 1	Reservoir-Lakeside 8. 14. 62 defeated Greensborough 5. 9. 39
1976	DVFL – Division 1	Reservoir-Lakeside 12. 13. 85 defeated Watsonia 8. 8. 56
1975	DVFL – Division 1	Reservoir-Lakeside 10. 9. 69 defeated Greensborough 5. 5. 35
1973	DVFL – Division 1	Reservoir-Lakeside 18. 7. 115 defeated Watsonia 9. 10. 64
1971	DVFL – Division 1	Reservoir-Lakeside 9. 7. 61 defeated Greensborough 6. 11. 47
1968	DVFL – Division 1	Reservoir-Lakeside 6. 14. 50 defeated Templestowe 5. 5. 35
