= Darcy Cameron =

Australian rules footballer (born 1995)

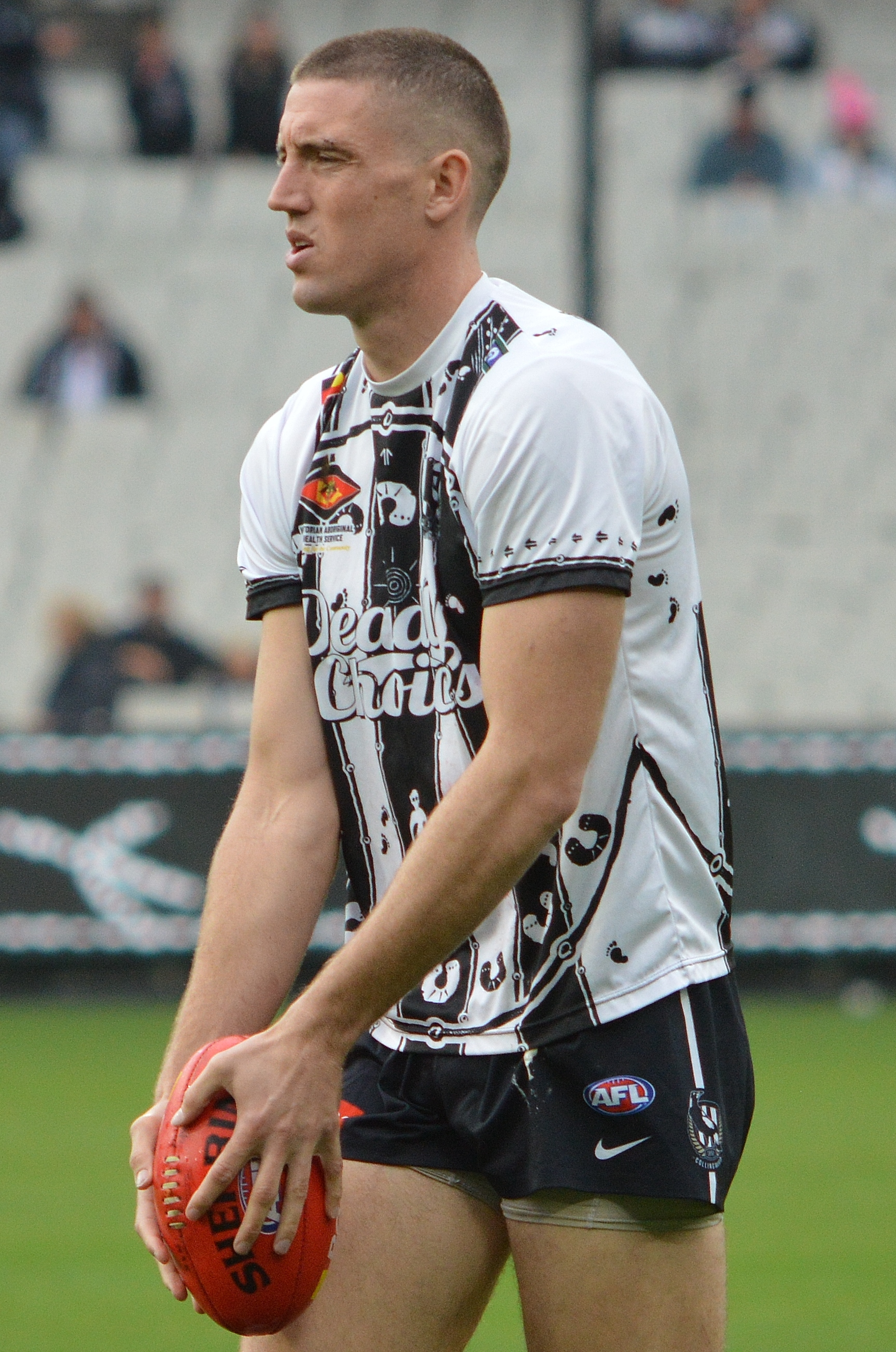
- Cameron playing for Collingwood in May 2025

Personal information
- Full name: Darcy Charles Duncan Cameron
- Nickname: Booker
- Born: 18 July 1995 (age 31); Albany, Western Australia
- Original team: North Albany
- Draft: 48, 2016 national draft
- Debut: 21 July 2018, Sydney vs. Gold Coast, at the SCG
- Height: 204 cm (6 ft 8 in)
- Weight: 103 kg (227 lb)
- Position: Ruck

Club information
- Current club: Collingwood
- Number: 14

Playing career^{1}
Years	Club	Games (Goals)
2017–2019	Sydney	1 (0)
2020–	Collingwood	142 (72)
Total		143 (72)

Representative team honours
Years	Team	Games (Goals)
2026	Western Australia	1 (0)
- ^{1} Playing statistics correct to the end of the 2026 season.

Career highlights
- AFL premiership player: 2023; Copeland Trophy: 2025

Darcy Charles Duncan Cameron (born 18 July 1995) is a professional Australian rules footballer playing for the Collingwood Football Club in the Australian Football League (AFL).

== Early life ==
Originally from Albany, Western Australia, Cameron grew up as a West Coast Eagles fan. He is the nephew of radio personality and politician Eoin Cameron. He was a cricketer and swimmer in his youth and played football for North Albany. He attended Hale School as a boarder. Cameron played for Claremont in the West Australian Football League, averaging one goal, 11 disposals and 16 hitouts over 40 league matches. He wore number 18.

== AFL career ==
=== Sydney Swans ===
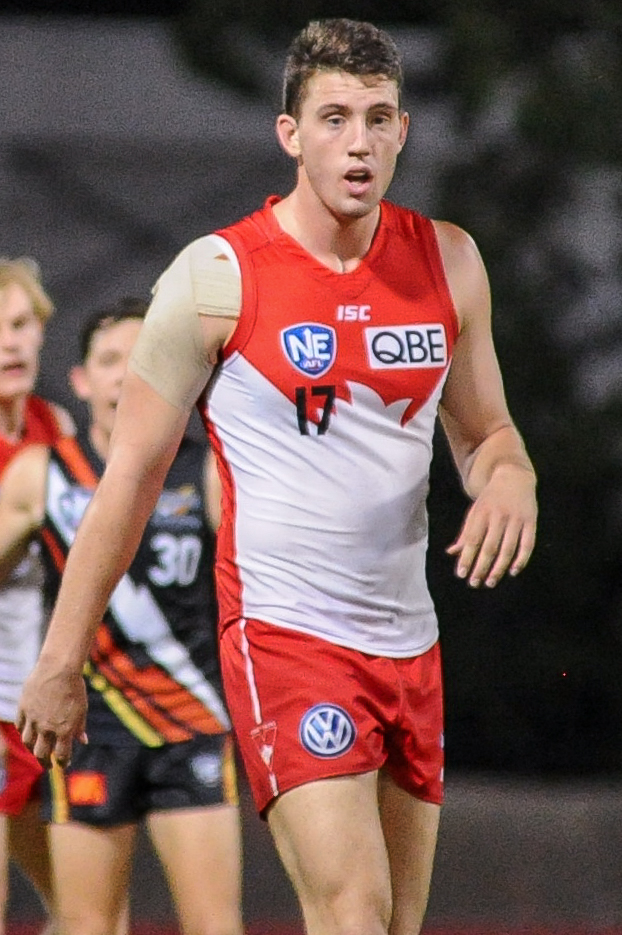
Cameron during a NEAFL game in April 2017

Cameron was expected to be drafted by West Coast in the 2016 AFL draft, but was taken by Sydney with pick 48. He made a positive start, impressing coach John Longmire in his first pre-season. Cameron lacerated his finger during training in March. It was later infected in a North East Australian Football League (NEAFL) match against Sydney University, rendering him unavailable for one week. Shoulder surgery halfway through the year restricted him to nine NEAFL games. In April, Cameron signed a contract extension, tying him to Sydney until 2019.

In 2018, Sam Naismith's season-ending anterior cruciate ligament injury, Kurt Tippett's retirement and a quadriceps injury to Sam Reid opened up senior opportunities for Cameron. He played both JLT Community Series matches and showed good form in the NEAFL, averaging 34 hitouts, 19 possessions and one goal over 13 matches. However, he did not make his AFL debut until round 18 against the Gold Coast Suns at the Sydney Cricket Ground.

=== Collingwood ===
Cameron was traded to Collingwood at the end of the 2019 AFL season. He was a member of Collingwood's team that won the 2023 AFL Grand Final where he had 4 clearances and 19 hitouts.

Cameron won the Copeland Trophy as Collingwood's best and fairest for the 2025 season, after being runner-up the previous season.

== In the media ==
In 2026, Cameron replaced Brisbane Lions player Sam Draper as host of the 200 Plus podcast, joining former Network 10 sports journalist Nick Butler and North Melbourne Football Club player Charlie Comben.

== Statistics ==
Updated to the end of round 22, 2026.

Legend
G	Goals	K	Kicks	D	Disposals	T	Tackles
B	Behinds	H	Handballs	M	Marks	H/O	Hit-outs

Season	Team	No.	Games	Totals								Averages (per game)								Votes
Season	Team	No.	Games	G	B	K	H	D	M	T	H/O	G	B	K	H	D	M	T	H/O	Votes
2017	Sydney	17	0	—	—	—	—	—	—	—	—	—	—	—	—	—	—	—	—	0
2018	Sydney	17	1	0	0	1	2	3	2	2	9	0.0	0.0	1.0	2.0	3.0	2.0	2.0	9.0	0
2019	Sydney	17	0	—	—	—	—	—	—	—	—	—	—	—	—	—	—	—	—	0
2020 (Note: The 2020 season was played with 17 home-and-away matches per team (down from 22) and 16-minute quarters with time on (down from 20-minute quarters with time on) due to the impact of the COVID-19 pandemic.)	Collingwood	14	10	4	2	46	30	76	36	14	57	0.4	0.2	4.6	3.0	7.6	3.6	1.4	5.7	0
2021	Collingwood	14	18	22	9	147	72	219	99	32	121	1.2	0.5	8.2	4.0	12.2	5.5	1.8	6.7	0
2022	Collingwood	14	24	20	8	204	108	312	91	80	423	0.8	0.3	8.5	4.5	13.0	3.8	3.3	17.6	4
2023^{#}	Collingwood	14	19	5	6	139	110	249	65	61	490	0.3	0.3	7.3	5.8	13.1	3.4	3.2	25.8	0
2024	Collingwood	14	23	11	2	230	129	359	106	65	673	0.5	0.1	10.0	5.6	15.6	4.6	2.8	29.3	0
2025	Collingwood	14	25	7	6	268	173	441	128	69	708	0.3	0.2	10.7	6.9	17.6	5.1	2.8	28.3	0
2026	Collingwood	14	20	2	4	183	175	358	77	66	454	0.1	0.2	9.2	8.8	17.9	3.9	3.3	22.7	0
Career			140	71	37	1218	799	2017	604	389	2935	0.5	0.3	8.7	5.7	14.4	4.3	2.8	21.0	4
