= Greg Fyffe =

Australian rules footballer

Personal information
- Born: 3 April 1963 (age 63)
- Original team: West Brunswick
- Height: 182 cm (6 ft 0 in)
- Weight: 74 kg (163 lb)

Playing career^{1}
Years	Club	Games (Goals)
1983	Collingwood	1 (2)
- ^{1} Playing statistics correct to the end of 1983.

Greg Fyffe (born 3 April 1963) is a former Australian rules footballer who played with Collingwood in the Victorian Football League (VFL).

Fyffe was originally from amateur club West Brunswick. His only appearance for Collingwood came during the 1983 VFL season, in their round five loss to Hawthorn at Victoria Park, where he kicked two goals and three behinds, having a total of 14 disposals. Despite having tidy match stats against the eventual Premiers, Fyffe was not selected again for Collingwood which did surprise many.

He won the Diamond Valley Football League's Division Two best and fairest award in 1987, with playing for West Preston, which he captain-coached in 1990 and 1991. Later in the 1990s he moved to Brisbane, where he still lives.
