= Darren McLaine =

Australian rules footballer

Personal information
- Born: 11 October 1961 (age 65)
- Original team: Eltham
- Height: 183 cm (6 ft 0 in)
- Weight: 79 kg (174 lb)

Playing career^{1}
| Years | Club | Games (Goals) |
| 1984 | Collingwood | 2 (1) |
- ^{1} Playing statistics correct to the end of 1984.

Darren McLaine (born 11 October 1961) is a former Australian rules footballer who played with Collingwood in the Victorian Football League (VFL).

McLaine was a premiership player with Eltham in 1982.

McLaine was a Premiership Player with Frankston Bombers FC in 1991.

He played two senior games for Collingwood in the 1984 VFL season, their round two win over St Kilda at Victoria Park and a loss to Essendon at Windy Hill in round three.
