= Macleod Football Club =

Names
- Full name: Macleod Football Club
- Nickname: The Kangaroos

2025 season
- After finals: 2nd
- Leading goalkicker: Darcy Barden (111)
- Best and fairest: Darcy Barden

Club details
- Founded: 1947
- Colours: Gold, White and Blue
- Competition: Northern Football Netball League
- Chairperson: TBC
- Coach: Nick Lynch
- Captain: Darcy Barden / Hayden Manuel
- Ground: De Winton Park

Other information
- Official website: macleodfc.com.au

Macleod Football Club is an Australian rules football club in Rosanna, Victoria, currently competing in Division 2 of the Northern Football Netball League.

== History ==
In 1946, Macleod F.C formed from humble beginnings Mr Harold Busbridge, who was the station master at the Macleod railway station, approached some local identities with the view to forming a football club in the local area.

Interest in forming a club gathered momentum and at the next meeting it was decided unanimously to begin fund-raising and purchase jumpers and socks for the newly formed Macleod Football Club. Nick George, who later became Macleod's first captain, suggested the colours be blue and white as he had played at North Melbourne in the VFL for two years. The colours registered were royal blue jumpers with a white collar and cuffs, royal blue socks with white tops. Later the jumper changed to royal blue and white vertical stripes, as per the North Melbourne jumper.

It was decided to play homes games at De Winton Park, Rosanna, because Macleod Cricket Club did not have a fence. The club attracted young men from Rosanna and Greensborough and had no problems getting enough numbers to form a senior team (but no reserves) for the 1947 season.

In the early 1960s, there was a tug of war between committee members with half wanting to rename the club Rosanna and the other half wanting to retain the name Macleod. Eventually there was a compromise and the club was renamed Macleod-Rosanna in 1962.

They won their sole first division senior premiership in 1971. After 1971, the club fell on some hard times and despite the best efforts of coaches, players, committees and supporters, slipped back into second division where it remained until winning the premiership in 2009 to earn promotion back into Division 1. In the 1980s, the club was held together by stalwarts such as Geoff Turner, the Hansen family, the Pearn family, the Boland family and the Melican family. It contested the 1982 second division grand final but was beaten by Eltham.

By the mid-1990s, the club was starting to emerge as a force again in the DVFL. It started a successful under-19s side that won a premiership in just its second season (1993, under Jamie Boland) and many of those players have gone on to represent the club with distinction. Former Collingwood ruckman and DVFL star Derek Shaw was appointed coach in 1998 and the club, which had dropped the name 'Rosanna' from its name and reverted to Macleod, made the finals for the first time since 1982 and followed up again in 1999. It also contested finals in 2002, 2003, 2004 and 2005. The Kangaroos were Division Two Runners Up in 2006, 2007 and 2008 and premiers in 2009. Coached by Wayne Harmes in 2006 and 2007 and by Cristian Brandt in 2008–2014. Following the 2014 season, Garry Ramsey was appointed as the new head coach of the senior team. Macleod enjoyed a period of strong play under Ramsey, being crowned Premiers of the Meadows Greyhounds Division 1 in 2015, and losing the following 3 premierships to Heidelberg, Bundoora and West Preston-Lakeside respectively. Ramsey departed at the conclusion of the 2018 NFNL season, being succeeded by Christian Stagliano.

In the 2019 season, controversy was raised around the Round 8 clash between North Heidelberg. When the final siren sounded, the scoreboard showed North Heidelberg defeating Macleod by a point. However, when the games footage was reviewed in the following week, it was announced that a point had been wrongly added to the Bulldogs score, where a score attempt in the second term was correctly judged out of bounds. The point was taken off, and the official result being a draw.

At the conclusion of the 2024 season, Macleod found themselves at the bottom of the ladder. This was a steep fall for a club who were perennial contenders for the latter half of the 2010s, and they now found themselves relegated to Division 2.

The Macleod Senior Best and Fairest award is named after Tom Melican Sr, a club stalwart and six-time best and fairest.

== Jumper ==
The jumper Macleod wears are White, Blue and Yellow panels. Accompanied by Blue shorts and Blue socks. In 2010 the club introduced a clash jumper that would be worn when teams wore a similar jumper to theirs.

== Junior club ==
Macleod formed a successful association with Macleod Junior Football Club and, in 1997, both clubs agreed to wear the same colours – royal blue, white and gold panels – and sing the same theme song. The club has a strong link to the MJFC which fields sides from under-9s to under-17s in the Yarra Junior Football League. MJFC puts almost 300 players on the field each week and has produced AFL players such as Matthew Collins, Jarrod Molloy, Mark Richardson, Robert Scott, Tony Woods, Ron McKeown and the latest great star Michael Hurley. MJFC's under-17s won four successive YJFL Division 1 under-17 premierships (a League record) in 2000, 2001, 2002 and 2003. In recent years there has been a tremendous influx of some of the most talented players in the Diamond Valley area coming to Macleod seniors. The junior club started an Auskick program in 2002 and there is now a clear pathway from the bottom to the top in the area.

The club was founded in 1968 by Don Crowe and a number of other members. Don become the first Inaugural Coach of the Club and was successful in a number of premierships. The club initially operated from Macleod Park and also played games at Macleod High School. However, the club changed its home ground to Winsor Park and operated out of an old wooden shed, which eventually was bricked in. The current canteen was an old tin shed attached to the wooden shed where it currently stands. Macleod Park was used for the older age groups. The club initially entered the Preston & District Junior Football League (PDJFL) and around 1975 joined the Doncaster District Junior Football League (DDJFL) entering teams in both competitions under the ODDS and EVENS system. In early to mid 1980s the club broke away from the PDJFL and solely entered teams in all age groups in the DDJFL. The DDJFL changed its name and now operate under the banner of the Yarra Junior Football League (YJFL) In the late 1980s under Jim Smith (MJFC) and Bob Crowley (MCC) a lot of work was done with assistance from local and federal government to extend the building at Macleod Park for it to become our permanent home ground with Winsor as our secondary ground. Since then two further extensions have taken place at Macleod Park. It was always anticipated to build a function room upstairs unfortunately to this day that has not happened. Up until the early 1990s the club had been losing players at the U/15 and Colts age group to other strong clubs in the area, to stop this it was decided to establish a relationship with a Senior Club and enter a U/19 team into the DVFL. Led by Bruce McDonald and his team in 1992 the link was established with the Macleod Football Club. Both clubs have never looked back from that move. In their 2nd year the U/19’S under Jamie Boland went onto win their first flag. The four Colt Divisions one Premierships (1999–2002) can also attest to this. In addition, Macleod Seniors going from bottom of the ladder to making the finals in 1998 the first time since 1985. Both clubs still operate as a separate identities, but are linked strongly together, with a fantastic relationship that continues to build every year. In all this, the Club Jumper had changed 5 times. The club has each jumper framed and displayed in its Club Rooms. In 2013 the club stood alone and contributed $25k to $220k project by local/state and federal government to have the lights upgraded at Macleod Park. These lights are sensational and to that point the YJFL used Macleod Park for their U/16's and U/18's Girls competition. In 2014 the lights at Winsor were also upgraded although at a low cost and by volunteers of the club. The latest upgrade in 2017 was Asphalting the Carpark.

Over the history of the club, it has an exceptional record of some 19 players including an umpire that went onto VFL/AFL representation. At one stage, the club was represented with five players playing in the same AFL round. These players are all displayed in MJFC club rooms. The Macleod Juniors has always been lucky to have been surrounded by good people involved in some way shape or form, from President – Committee – Coaches and Just the Volunteers in all other aspects of getting a team on the ground and making the club to what it is today. Everyone who has been involved no matter how big or small should sit back and give themselves a pat on the back.
