= Patrick Lipinski =

Australian rules footballer

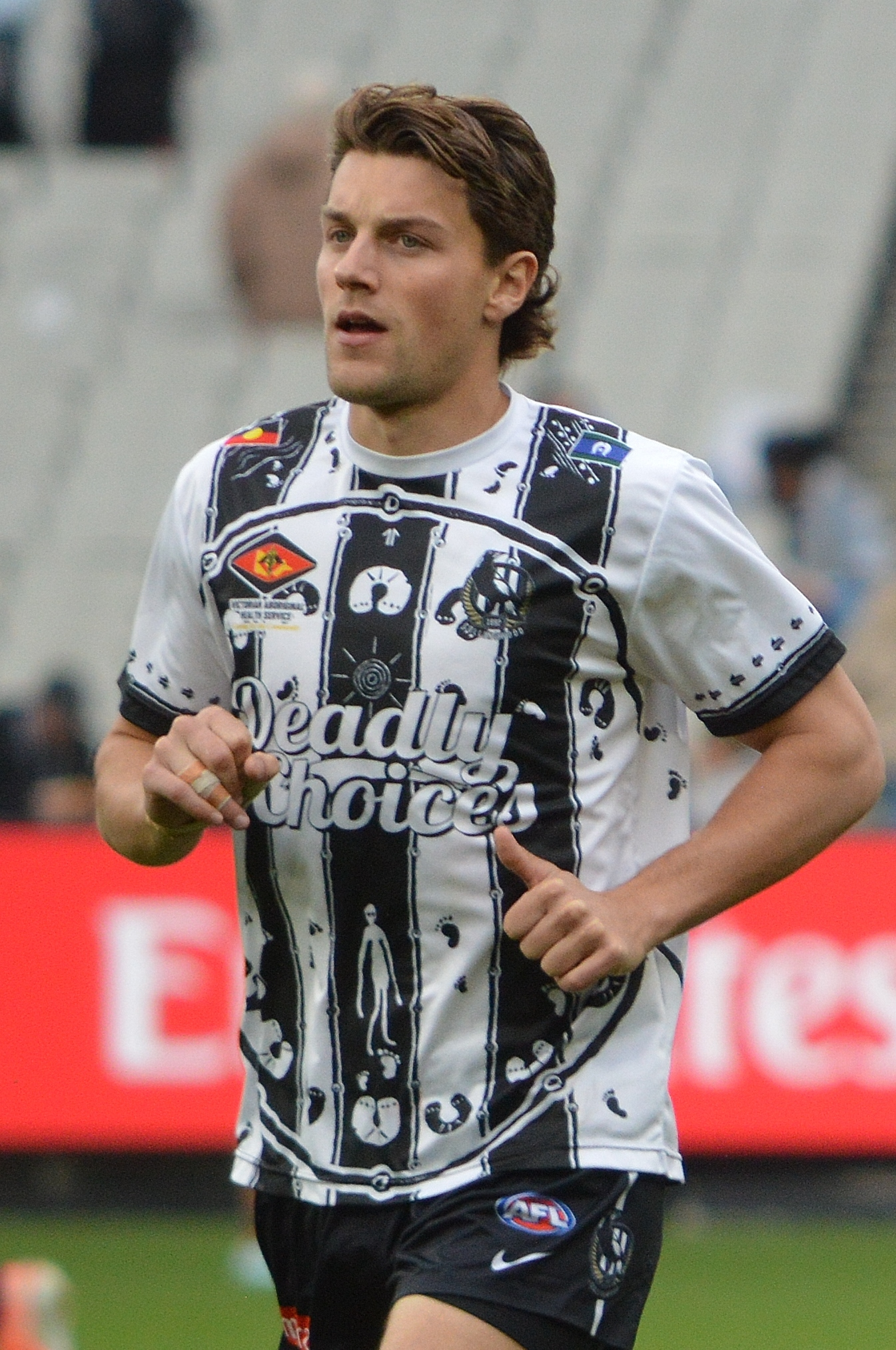
- Lipinski with Collingwood in May 2025

Personal information
- Full name: Patrick Lipinski
- Nickname: Lippa
- Born: 17 July 1998 (age 28)
- Original team: Northern Knights (TAC Cup)/Eltham
- Draft: No. 28, 2016 national draft
- Debut: Round 23, 2017, Western Bulldogs vs. Hawthorn, at Etihad Stadium
- Height: 190 cm (6 ft 3 in)
- Weight: 80 kg (176 lb)
- Position: Midfielder / forward

Club information
- Current club: Collingwood
- Number: 1

Playing career^{1}
Years	Club	Games (Goals)
2017–2021	Western Bulldogs	56 (30)
2022–	Collingwood	105 (52)
Total		161 (82)
- ^{1} Playing statistics correct to the end of the 2026 season.

Career highlights
- AFL premiership player: 2023

Patrick Jonathan Lipinski (born 17 July 1998) is a professional Australian rules footballer playing for the Collingwood Football Club in the Australian Football League (AFL). He previously played for the Western Bulldogs from 2017 to 2021.

== Junior football and playing career ==
Lipinski grew up in Melbourne’s north east playing junior football for Montmorency and Eltham in the Northern Football League. He later played representative football for Northern Knights in the TAC Cup, which led to him being drafted.

He was drafted by the Western Bulldogs with their second selection and twenty-eighth overall in the 2016 national draft. He made his debut in the nine point loss against Hawthorn in round twenty-three of the 2017 season.

At the end of the 2021 AFL season, Lipinski requested a trade to Collingwood. He was officially traded on 11 October.

During a practice match in the 2023 pre season against Hawthorn, Lipinski injured his shoulder ruling him out for the first half of the 2023 AFL season. Lipinksi returned from injury in Round 13 and played 14 games for the season including Collingwood's Grand Final win against Brisbane Lions.

== Statistics ==
Updated to the end of round 22, 2026.

Legend
G	Goals	K	Kicks	D	Disposals	T	Tackles
B	Behinds	H	Handballs	M	Marks
#	Played in that season's premiership team

Season	Team	No.	Games	Totals							Averages (per game)							Votes
Season	Team	No.	Games	G	B	K	H	D	M	T	G	B	K	H	D	M	T	Votes
2017	Western Bulldogs	27	1	0	3	6	12	18	4	1	0.0	3.0	6.0	12.0	18.0	4.0	1.0	0
2018	Western Bulldogs	27	17	12	5	113	137	250	48	41	0.7	0.3	6.6	8.1	14.7	2.8	2.4	0
2019	Western Bulldogs	27	14	11	4	137	170	307	65	50	0.8	0.3	9.8	12.1	21.9	4.6	3.6	0
2020 (Note: The 2020 season was played with 17 home-and-away matches per team (down from 22) and 16-minute quarters with time on (down from 20-minute quarters with time on) due to the impact of the COVID-19 pandemic.)	Western Bulldogs	27	13	5	4	90	121	211	32	31	0.4	0.3	6.9	9.3	16.2	2.5	2.4	0
2021	Western Bulldogs	27	11	2	1	74	79	153	39	22	0.2	0.1	6.7	7.2	13.9	3.5	2.0	0
2022	Collingwood	1	25	9	4	273	278	551	86	92	0.4	0.2	10.9	11.1	22.0	3.4	3.7	4
2023^{#}	Collingwood	1	14	5	2	114	135	249	40	47	0.4	0.1	8.1	9.6	17.8	2.9	3.4	0
2024	Collingwood	1	23	18	9	185	218	403	74	71	0.8	0.4	8.0	9.5	17.5	3.2	3.1	5
2025	Collingwood	1	23	10	11	204	191	395	83	59	0.4	0.5	8.9	8.3	17.2	3.6	2.6	0
2026	Collingwood	1	19	10	11	165	219	384	83	45	0.5	0.6	8.7	11.5	20.2	4.4	2.4	0
Career			160	82	54	1361	1560	2921	554	459	0.5	0.3	8.5	9.8	18.3	3.5	2.9	9
