= Charlie West (footballer, born 2006) =

Australian rules footballer (born 2006)

Personal information
- Full name: Charlie West
- Born: 1 February 2006
- Original team: Woodville-West Torrens (SANFL)
- Draft: No. 50, 2024 national draft
- Height: 194 cm (6 ft 4 in)
- Position: Key forward

Club information
- Current club: Collingwood
- Number: 29

Playing career^{1}
Years	Club	Games (Goals)
2025–	Collingwood	10 (10)
- ^{1} Playing statistics correct to the end of the 2026 season.

Charlie West (born 1 February 2006) is an Australian rules footballer who plays for the Collingwood Football Club in the Australian Football League (AFL).

== State career ==
West played for Woodville-West Torrens in the South Australian National Football League (SANFL) under-18s competition during the 2024 season. He was part of club's premiership-winning team, recording 17 disposals and kicking two goals in a four-point victory over Central District.

== AFL career ==
West was selected by Collingwood with pick 50 in the 2024 AFL draft.

In his first ten matches for Collingwood's reserves team in the Victorian Football League (VFL), West kicked 24 goals, including a goal after the final siren to defeat Sandringham in round 13. The following week, he made his AFL debut against West Coast at Marvel Stadium and scored a goal with his first kick.

== Personal life ==
West is the grandson of former AFL chief executive Wayne Jackson.

== Statistics ==
Updated to the end of round 22, 2026.

Legend
G	Goals	K	Kicks	D	Disposals	T	Tackles
B	Behinds	H	Handballs	M	Marks

Season	Team	No.	Games	Totals							Averages (per game)							Votes
Season	Team	No.	Games	G	B	K	H	D	M	T	G	B	K	H	D	M	T	Votes
2025	Collingwood	29	1	1	0	1	3	4	0	1	1.0	0.0	1.0	3.0	4.0	0.0	1.0	0
2026	Collingwood	29	6	3	4	23	23	46	20	5	0.5	0.7	3.8	3.8	7.7	3.3	0.8	0
Career			7	4	4	24	26	50	20	6	0.6	0.6	3.4	3.7	7.1	2.9	0.9	0
