= Roan Steele =

Australian rules footballer (born 2001)

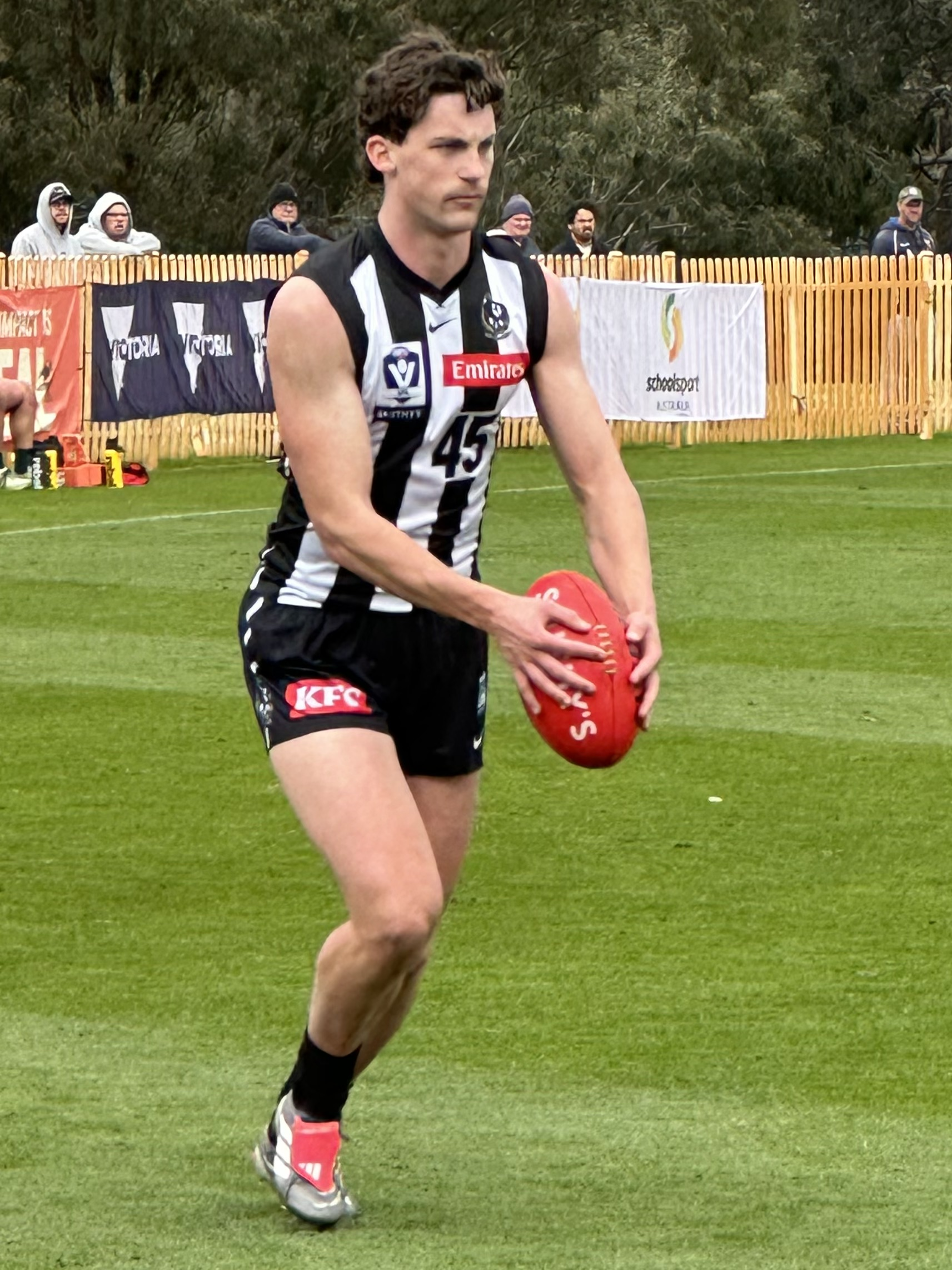
- Steele in July 2026

Personal information
- Born: 22 October 2001 (age 25)
- Original team: Frankston YCW/Casey Demons/West Perth
- Draft: No. 8, 2025 mid-season rookie draft
- Debut: Round 17, 2025, Collingwood vs. Carlton, at the MCG
- Height: 183 cm (6 ft 0 in)
- Position: Midfielder

Club information
- Current club: Collingwood
- Number: 45

Playing career^{1}
Years	Club	Games (Goals)
2025–	Collingwood	24 (15)
- ^{1} Playing statistics correct to the end of the 2026 season.

Roan Steele (born 22 October 2001) is a professional Australian rules footballer who plays for the Collingwood Football Club in the Australian Football League (AFL).

== Pre-AFL career ==
Steele originally played for Frankston YCW in the Mornington Peninsula Football League before joining the Casey Demons in the VFL in 2022. He played 15 games in his debut season, then 20 in 2023, coming second in Casey's best and fairest award in the process. In 2024 he came runner-up in Casey's best and fairest for the second year in a row.

In 2025, Steele made the move to Western Australia to play for West Perth in the WAFL. Across seven matches for West Perth, Steele kicked five goals and averaged 21.1 disposals.

== AFL career ==
=== 2025 ===
Steele was selected by Collingwood with pick 8 of the 2025 mid-season rookie draft. He made his debut against Carlton in round 17 of the 2025 AFL season.

At the conclusion of the 2025 season, Steele signed a two-year contract extension to the end of 2027.

=== 2026 ===
Steele started to cement his spot in Collingwood's best 23 in 2026. Playing off a wing, he kicked his first career goal against St Kilda in Opening Round. He then kicked two the following week against Adelaide.

== Statistics ==
Updated to the end of round 22, 2026.

Legend
G	Goals	K	Kicks	D	Disposals	T	Tackles
B	Behinds	H	Handballs	M	Marks

Season	Team	No.	Games	Totals							Averages (per game)							Votes
Season	Team	No.	Games	G	B	K	H	D	M	T	G	B	K	H	D	M	T	Votes
2025	Collingwood	45	5	0	0	33	15	48	15	3	0.0	0.0	6.6	3.0	9.6	3.0	0.6	0
2026	Collingwood	45	16	13	7	127	93	220	45	22	0.8	0.4	7.9	5.8	13.8	2.8	1.4	0
Career			21	13	7	160	108	268	60	25	0.6	0.3	7.6	5.1	12.8	2.9	1.2	0
