= Horsham, Victoria =

Regional city in Victoria, Australia

Horsham
- City
- The T & G Building, Horsham City centre Horsham Regional Art Gallery Botanic Gardens St John the Divine Anglican Church White Hart Hotel Exchange Hotel Holy Trinity Lutheran Church

- Interactive map of Horsham
- Coordinates: 36°43′S 142°12′E
- Country: Australia
- State: Victoria
- LGA: Rural City of Horsham
- Location: 297 km (185 mi) NW of Melbourne; 427 km (265 mi) SE of Adelaide; 188 km (117 mi) WNW of Ballarat; 313 km (194 mi) S of Mildura

Government
  - State electorate: Lowan
  - Federal division: Mallee

Area
  - Total: 23.9 km^{2} (9.2 sq mi)
- Elevation: 128 m (420 ft)

Population
  - Total: 16,985 (2021 census)
  - Density: 710.7/km^{2} (1,841/sq mi)
- Postcode: 3400
- County: Borung
- Mean max temp: 21.9 °C (71.4 °F)
- Mean min temp: 7.8 °C (46.0 °F)
- Annual rainfall: 379.3 mm (14.93 in)

Horsham (/ˈhɔːrʃəm/) is a regional city in the Wimmera region of western Victoria, Australia. Located on a bend in the Wimmera River, Horsham is approximately 300 kilometres (190 mi) northwest of the state capital Melbourne. As of the 2021 census, Horsham and surrounds had a population of 16,985. It is the most populous city in Wimmera, and the main administrative centre for the Rural City of Horsham local government area. It is the eleventh largest city in Victoria after Melbourne, Geelong, Ballarat, Bendigo, Wodonga, Mildura, Shepparton, Warrnambool, Traralgon, and Wangaratta.

An early settler James Monckton Darlot named the settlement after the town of Horsham in his native England. It grew throughout the latter 19th and early 20th centuries as a centre of Western Victoria's wheat and wool industry, becoming the largest city in the Wimmera and Western Victoria by the early 1910s. Horsham was declared a city in 1949 and was named Australia's Tidiest Town in 2001 and Victoria's Tidiest Town in 2021.

== History ==
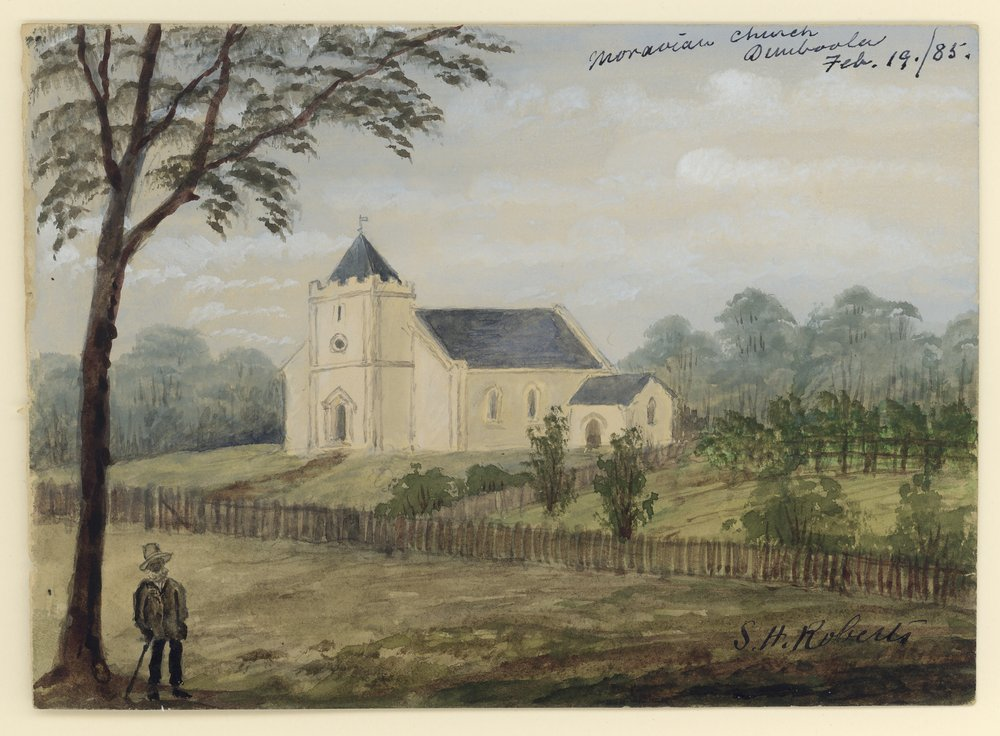
Watercolour by S.H. Roberts of the Moravian Church at the Ebenezer Mission in 1885

Sepia Wash drawing of the Wimmera River in 1845 by Duncan Cooper

=== Pre-colonisation ===
Recent archaeological research of rock shelters by La Trobe University in the Grampians found clear evidence of Aboriginal occupation 3–4,000 years ago, and the possibility of occupation up to 22,000 years ago. The rock shelters would have provided reliable access to water and a base to hunt megafauna on the plains of the Wimmera. Then "around the time of the arrival of the First Fleet, the Jardwa people were being forced south by either a Murray or northern Victorian tribe called the Wotjol". By the time of European exploration and settlement, the Jardwadjali language (a dialect of the Wemba-wemba language group common across most of Western Victoria) was well established across the southern portion of the Wimmera region. Wimmera Aboriginal people hunted and traded widely, with stone for their tools coming up from the Grampians in the Ararat district. Relations between Europeans and Aboriginal people, as across much of Australia, were mixed, featuring both conflict and cooperation. One of the last Aboriginal missions in Victoria, Ebenezer Mission, was run successfully by the Moravian Order during the 1870s and 1880s, providing education and employment for the region's Indigenous people before it fell into decline in the 1890s and closed in 1902.

=== European exploration ===
Major Thomas Mitchell was the first European to pass through the area, naming the Wimmera River on 18 July 1836. After the explorer Edward Eyre passed through the region seeking an overland route between Port Philip and Adelaide, he reported to The Adelaide Gazette on 14 July 1838, that the region was "well-watered and affording good pasturage for stock."

=== Settlement ===
The squatters were the first European settlers in the Wimmera. William J Bracewell made the first claim, claiming 100,000 acres at Dooen on 10 August 1842. Although Captain Chris Lewis was the first resident of the Wimmera, settling at Ledcourt Station at Glenorchy in 1840. Charles Carter, a Squatter from Van Diemen's Land established his property "Brim Springs" nearby in 1845. The Wimmera region was made part of the Portland Bay district in 1843 and then became its own district in 1846. Land ownership was formalised in 1847, and the "Wimmera squatters wasted no time in securing their land cheaply as leasehold." George Langlands, a merchant from Melbourne was encouraged by James Darlot to move to the Wimmera region and open a store. Langlands reached the Wimmera and opened a general store in October 1849 on what is now the corner of Darlot and Hamilton Street. A Post Office had opened a year earlier on 1 July 1848. By 1851 the small village of Horsham had been established, consisting of an estimated 18 homes.

=== Town ===
The 1851 census counted 2,019 people living in the Wimmera region. The Victorian gold rush connected Horsham with the rest of the state, when it became a stop-over point for the Gold Escort in 1851. Governance was formalised in 1858 when the Wimmera area was included in region's first electoral district, covering an area from the Murry River in the north, then south to the Wimmera River and then east to the Grampian Range. Then in 1862 the Horsham District Road Board was established, which later evolved into the Horsham Shire with the passing of the Local Government Act in 1864. The electric telegraph was connected in 1875 and the main railway from Melbourne reached Horsham in 1879. The Horsham Borough Council and the Shire of Wimmera operated the McKenzie Creek Tramway from the town to a stone quarry, approximately 8 kilometres (5 mi) to the south. The horse tramway opened within the town in 1885 but had ceased operating by 1927. Special picnic trains operated from time to time conveying residents in open wagons along the McKenzie Creek Tramway.

The 1870s saw significant economic and demographic growth in Horsham. During this period the foundry, the hospital, and the Horsham Agricultural Society were established, with the first Horsham show held in 1876. Geoffrey Blainey, notes in his History of Victoria, that the Victorian railway building boom of the 1870s enabled large-scale wheat production to begin in the Wimmera. He also describes a unique migration of German farmers, mostly Lutherans from South Australia, who travelled across east in covered-wagons along with their families and herds of cattle and then settled in the Wimmera district. Blainey writes that "nothing in Australian history so resembles the opening of the American west as this trek of farmers to the Victorian plains in the 1870s'." Farming production in the region dramatically increased, and wheat was established as the dominant agricultural crop.

Although flooding along the Wimmera River was noted during the early period of the settlement, the first major flood was recorded in 1883 with the first flood causing serious damage occurring in 1889, when several buildings and the tramway were damaged. Several serious floods then occurred along the Wimmera River over the next five decades, in 1894, 1903, 1909, 1915 and then in 1923. The flood in 1923 was the third largest on record. In response to this history of flooding, the council successfully applied in 1946 for money from the State Parliamentary Public Works Committee for flood management.

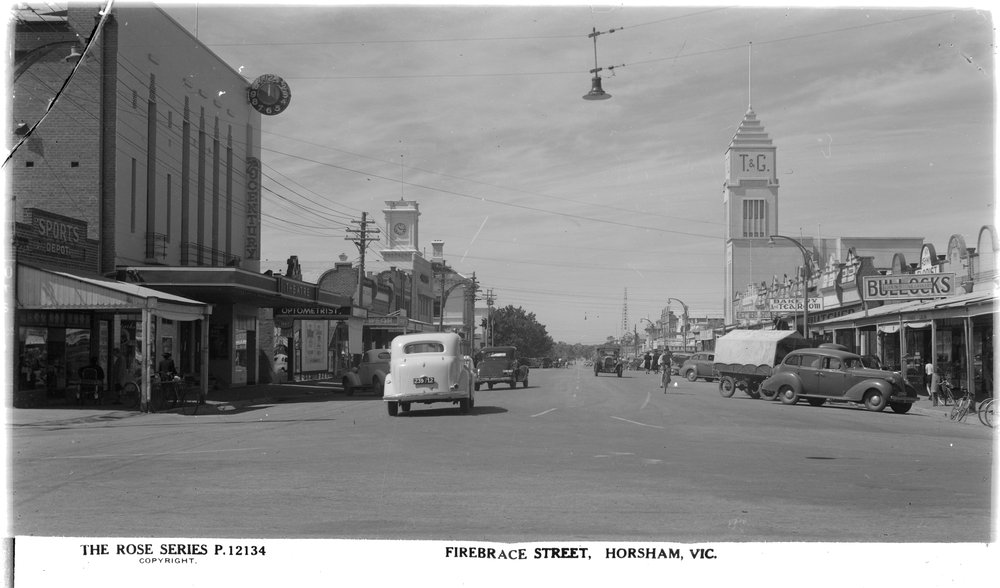
Photograph of Firebrace St Horsham

Men from Horsham fought in the First World War. "By mid-August 1914 the first of Horsham's soldiers were given a rousing civic farewell at the Town Hall." However conscription "divided the community", with the Anti-Conscription League noting the high rate (6%) of conscription in the Horsham district. The Discharged Soldier Settlement Act of 1917 was created to give returning soldiers a head-start establishing farms in regional Australia. According to the act returning soldiers with farm-experience could apply for a block of land. By 1919 2,933 ex-servicemen had taken up the opportunity. The average size of the land grants were 250 to 500 acres (100 to 200 ha). When World War II started, men from Horsham again volunteered. The war effort was enthusiastically embraced, for example in May 1940, when King George VI made a Commonwealth-wide call to prayer, 1,800 people attended a religious service at the town hall. Returning servicemen were again given the opportunity to take up land grants at the end of the war, with the average size of the blocks being between 650 and 750 acres (260 and 300 ha).

=== City ===
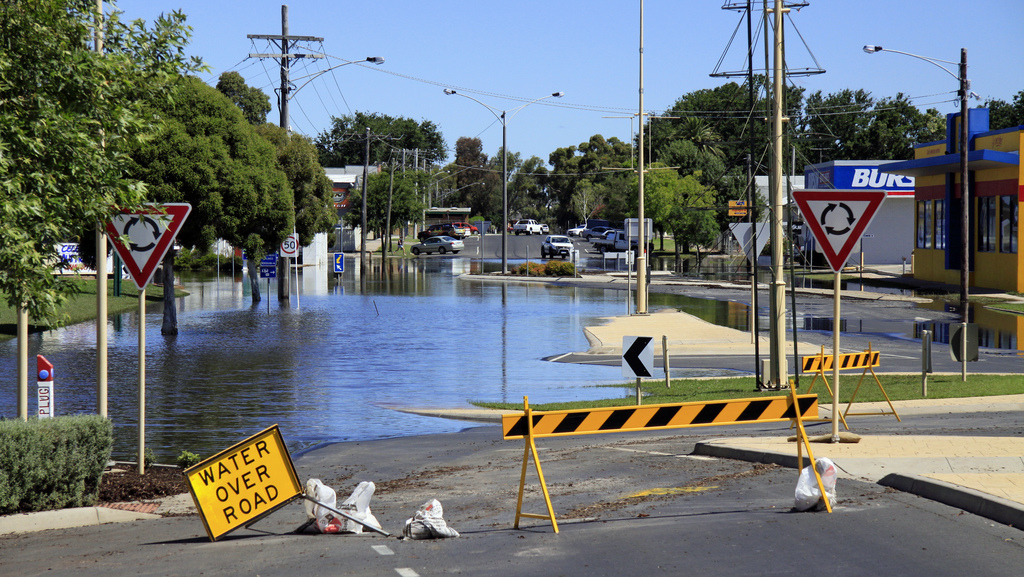
2011 floods threatened the CBD. This photo shows water levels at the south end of Firebrace Street from Hamilton Street

Horsham's population had reached 6,388 in 1947 and so it was declared a city on 24 May 1949. In 1950 Horsham celebrated its Centenary with a parade through the city. But then tragedy struck on 24 February 1951, when a train and bus collided at a level crossing on Dimboola Road, resulting in 11 deaths. The Horsham Streetscape was dramatically remodelled in the 1960s when planning laws were changed and shopfront verandahs were removed from the Post Office, The Bull and Mouth, and The White Hart pubs. The Horsham City council installed the first parking meters on Firebrace Street in 1963. A major fire damaged the new State Public Office on McLachlan Street in 1971. In 1995, the Rural City of Horsham was formed through the amalgamation of the Horsham City, Wimmera and Arapiles Shires. Horsham was named Australia's Tidiest Town in 2001 and was also named Victoria's tidiest town in 2015.

The Black Saturday bushfires of 2009 affected Horsham, with 5,700 ha (14,000 acres) area burnt around the city's fringe including the golf club and eight homes destroyed in the Haven area. Horsham experienced significant flooding in successive years in 2010 and 2011 Victorian floods. During these events, the Wimmera reached 3.32 m and 4.71 m respectively. The 2011 event was particularly severe with the Wimmera River reaching a record peak; over 1,000 residents were evacuated as flood waters divided the city and damaged 600 houses pushing up to a metre of water into parts of the CBD.

== Traditional ownership ==
The Victorian government has recognised the Wotjobaluk, Jaadwa, Jadawadjali, Wergaia and Jupagik nations as the traditional owners for the Horsham area. These five nations are represented by the Barengi Gadjin Land Council Aboriginal Corporation.

== Population ==
According to the 2021 census of population, there were 20,429 people in Horsham.

- 49% Male
- 51% Female
- Aboriginal and Torres Strait Islander people made up 1.8% of the population (Indigenous status not stated 5.1% and Non-Indigenous 93.2%)
- The median age is 41

== Geography ==
=== Wimmera River ===
The city of Horsham is situated on the floodplain of the Wimmera River, south of the Dooen Swamp and north of the River's junction with McKenzie Creek. The Wimmera River rises in the western slopes of the Pyrenees and then runs west towards Horsham before turning north at Quantong and heading north towards the Murray, but empties into Lake Hindmarsh. The Wimmera River is dammed by a weir at the southern edge of the city. A recent study in December 2017, found that the Millennium drought decimated the Platypus population in the River leaving only a solitary colony south of the weir.

=== Land use ===
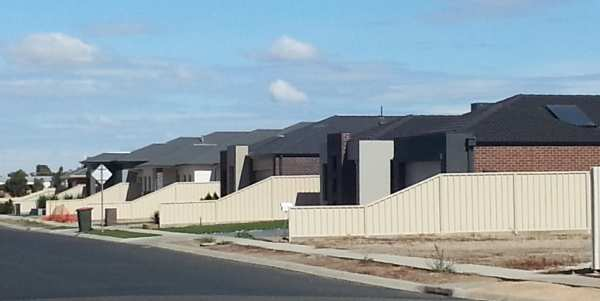
Suburban expansion along River Roads Southbank Wetlands precinct.

Horsham's topography is flat, approximately 128 metres (420 ft) above sea level. The central business district (CBD) is laid out in a grid plan south of the train line and is characterised by wide streets and several roundabouts. Firebrace Street, running north–south through the middle of the CBD is one of Horsham's original "thoroughfares" (first surveyed in 1849) and is named after a soldier from the British Army, Major William Firebrace (1795–1856). Residential areas extend north of the train line, west towards Natimuk and south-west towards Haven and south-east across Burnt Creek. A light industrial area is located south of the Wimmera River.

Due to the flat topography and floodplain clay, there are very few multi-story buildings. The five most prominent buildings in the city are the State Government Offices on McLachlan Street, the T&G clocktower on Firebrace Street, St John Anglican church on the Western Highway, the Horsham Cinema and Horsham Town Hall, both on Pynsent Street.

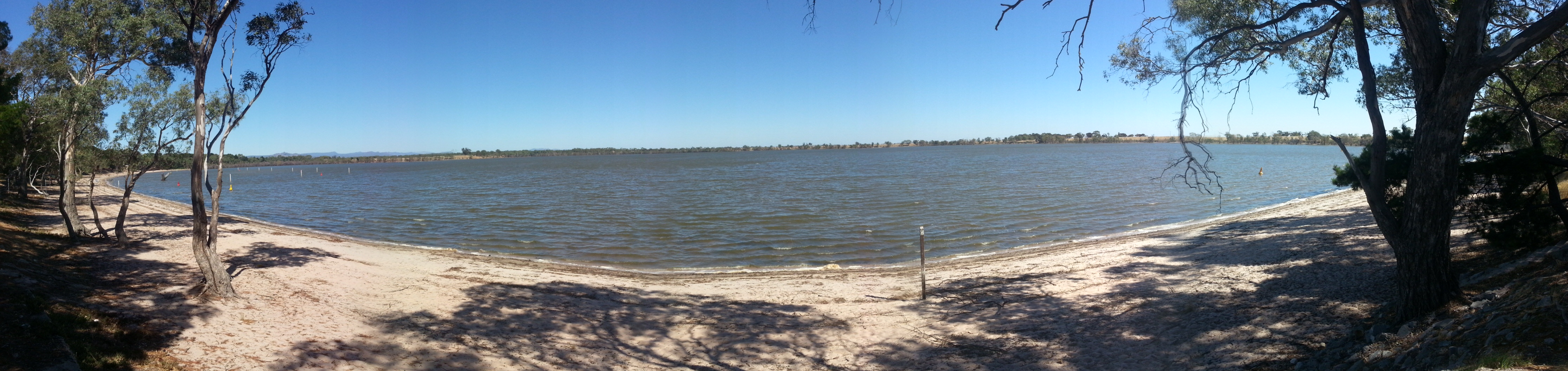
Panorama of Green Lake located 10 km southeast at Bungalally is one of several large lakes in the Horsham district

=== Mining ===
Due to Horsham's location in the Murray Basin, the area to the east and south of the city contain extensive deposits of Mineral Sands, primarily ilmenite, zircon and rutile. Preliminary exploration was conducted in the 1980s at Drung, a locality 20 kilometres (12 mi) east of Horsham. However, the Conservation Council of Australia opposed the exploration citing the long-term consequences of mining activity and the possibility of inadequate rehabilitation.

In June 2018 new mining exploration leases for the Wimmera region were granted by the Victorian State Government.

== Climate ==
Horsham has a cold semi-arid climate (Köppen climate classification: BSk) with a mean annual temperature of 14.7 °C (58.5 °F) and a mean annual rainfall of 379.3 mm (14.93 in). It experiences one of the coolest climates of this type in Australia, due to its southern latitude and exposure to cold airmasses off the Great Australian Bight.

=== Summer ===
Most summer days in Horsham are warm to hot, clear and dry with very low relative humidity. January is the warmest month with a mean maximum temperature of 30.6 °C (87.1 °F). Horsham is prone to experiencing extreme heat days, particularly for its latitude, and records about 25 days annually with maximum temperatures above 35 °C (95 °F). These are confined to the months of November to March, with most occurring in January and February.

On the other hand, overnight minima during summer are typically quite cool, often dropping to around 12 °C (54 °F). The resulting wide diurnal range is characteristic of the BSk climate type; in summer the difference between the daily high temperature and the overnight minimum is frequently greater than 20 °C and may exceed 25 °C on days with a particularly low dew point. Temperatures of 7 °C (45 °F) or lower are usually attained with the passage of cold fronts - many of which see daily maxima struggling to exceed 22 °C (72 °F) under full sunshine, and are often coupled with a strong west to south-westerly wind.

=== Winter ===
Horsham typically experiences cool, relatively long winters where cloudy days featuring light, misty rain and drizzle are common. July is the coolest month with a mean maximum temperature of 13.6 °C (56.5 °F). Overnight minima during the winter months average between 3 °C (37 °F) and 4 °C (39 °F), which is similar to most inland localities in Victoria. Air frosts occur on 26 days annually, often between May and October. Rainy days - defined as days with any amount of rainfall – predominate in June to August, but the total winter rainfall received remains low relative to most locations in Victoria and is only slightly higher than that received in summer. Though snow is very rare in Horsham, sleet and chilling rains of 4 °C (39 °F) or less are not too uncommon. The snow was widespread on 26 July 1882.

=== Statistics ===
Climate data for Horsham Aerodrome 36.67°S 142.17°E, elev. 134 m (440 ft) (1990–2026)
Month	Jan	Feb	Mar	Apr	May	Jun	Jul	Aug	Sep	Oct	Nov	Dec	Year
Record high °C (°F)	47.8 (118.0)	47.4 (117.3)	41.8 (107.2)	37.0 (98.6)	28.0 (82.4)	24.0 (75.2)	21.6 (70.9)	26.0 (78.8)	31.0 (87.8)	38.0 (100.4)	42.3 (108.1)	47.9 (118.2)	47.9 (118.2)
Mean daily maximum °C (°F)	31.2 (88.2)	30.4 (86.7)	27.1 (80.8)	22.3 (72.1)	17.7 (63.9)	14.3 (57.7)	13.7 (56.7)	15.2 (59.4)	18.0 (64.4)	21.8 (71.2)	25.8 (78.4)	28.7 (83.7)	22.2 (72.0)
Mean daily minimum °C (°F)	12.8 (55.0)	12.4 (54.3)	10.4 (50.7)	7.4 (45.3)	5.1 (41.2)	3.6 (38.5)	3.2 (37.8)	3.3 (37.9)	4.4 (39.9)	5.7 (42.3)	8.6 (47.5)	10.7 (51.3)	7.3 (45.1)
Record low °C (°F)	1.0 (33.8)	2.5 (36.5)	1.0 (33.8)	−2.0 (28.4)	−4.3 (24.3)	−6.0 (21.2)	−5.0 (23.0)	−4.1 (24.6)	−3.2 (26.2)	−3.0 (26.6)	−2.0 (28.4)	1.0 (33.8)	−6.0 (21.2)
Average rainfall mm (inches)	30.6 (1.20)	18.9 (0.74)	14.4 (0.57)	26.3 (1.04)	32.4 (1.28)	40.7 (1.60)	39.3 (1.55)	41.3 (1.63)	36.9 (1.45)	35.2 (1.39)	32.7 (1.29)	24.5 (0.96)	373.2 (14.69)
Average rainy days (≥ 0.2 mm)	4.9	4.3	4.9	6.5	11.4	16.6	19.0	16.8	13.3	9.8	7.8	5.5	120.8
Average afternoon relative humidity (%)	28	31	34	41	56	66	67	61	54	43	35	29	45
Source 1: Australian Bureau of Meteorology
Source 2: Australian Broadcasting Corporation

== Governance ==
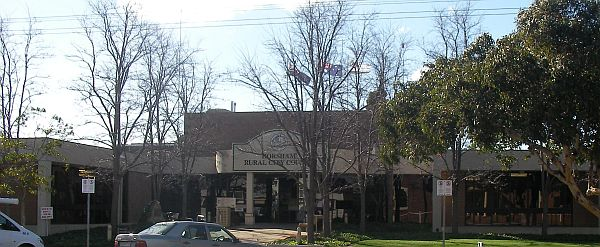
Council offices on Roberts Avenue

In 1993 the Kennett Government passed the Local Government (Miscellaneous Amendments) Bill which resulted in council amalgamations across Victoria. So in 1995 the City of Horsham merged with the Wimmera and Arapiles shires to form the Horsham Rural City Council, making Horsham the seat of local government. The current mayor of Horsham is Brian Klowss.

In the Legislative Assembly of Victoria Horsham is part of the Electoral district of Lowan and is currently represented by Emma Kealy. For the Legislative Council of Victoria Horsham is part of the Western Victoria Region and is currently represented by Jaala Pulford, Simon Ramsay, Gayle Tierney, Josh Morris and James Purcell.

In the Federal Parliament of Australia the city is represented in the Australian House of Representatives by the Division of Mallee. Currently held by Anne Webster and until the 2019 federal election was considered a very safe National party seat.

The Horsham Police station on Roberts Ave, along with ordinary policing duties also handles traffic, firearm registration and crime investigation. Next to the Police station is the Horsham Magistrates' Court.

== Culture ==
The Horsham Botanic Gardens, managed by the Horsham Rural City Council, are located between the Horsham City Oval and Horsham Caravan Park and were designed by landscape architect William Guilfoyle. Sawyer park alongside the Wimmera River contains a sound shell and hosts the ANZAC day dawn service, Carols by Candlelight and Australia Day events.

=== Arts ===
The Horsham Town Hall, rebuilt and enlarged in February 2016, is the city's main performing arts venue, attracting a wide range of national and international acts. It is operated by the Horsham Rural City Council also contains the Horsham Regional Art Gallery. The Wesley Performing Arts Centre, once the Wesley Church, was, until 2018, a second performance venue. However, it was closed indefinitely in June 2018 due to safety concerns. The Horsham Arts Council, formed in 1972 and based in Old Hamilton Road, regularly stages musicals. Horsham also hosts the annual Art is...festival, some aspects of the biennial Nati Frinj Festival and Awakenings (Australia's only regional disability arts festival). Centre Cinemas manage a movie theatre on Pynsent St.

=== Cuisine ===
An item of food said to be unique to Horsham is the florrie. A variation of the cordon bleu, it consists of a piece of beef steak thinly sliced, wrapped around slices of ham and processed cheese, and then crumbed. Introduced by local chef Alfonso Baviello in the mid 20th century and originally dubbed the Florentine, it can be purchased fresh at Horsham butcher shops or as a cooked meal in cafes and pubs.

=== Music ===
Horsham has community bands such as the Horsham City Brass Band and the Horsham Pipe Band with many towns surrounding the city having their own community bands. Some of the Horsham pubs host live music and the city hosts both the annual Kannamroo festival and Horsham Country Music Festival.

=== Media ===
Horsham is served by three newspapers, the Wimmera Mail-Times (a tri-weekly paid publication), the Weekly Advertiser (a free weekly) and the Horsham Times (a weekly paid publication). Printed news from the Australian Broadcasting Company (ABC) Wimmera is available on the ABC Wimmera Facebook page and is also broadcast via its local radio station. Other available national radio stations in Horsham are ABC Classic, Radio National, ABC NewsRadio and Triple J. 3WM 1089 AM and MIXXFM 101.3 are the local commercial stations and Triple H 96.5 FM is the local community radio station.

Horsham is also served by local transmission of free-to-air television networks ABC, Seven Regional Victoria (Seven), 10 Regional Victoria (10), WIN (Nine) and SBS.

=== Religions and faiths ===
A total of 60% of people in Horsham identified with Christianity at the 2016 national census (which is higher than the national average) although nearly 30% identified as "no religious affiliation", which reflected the national average.

Denominational Christian churches
Denomination	Building name	Building location
Anglican	Church of St John the Divine	162 Baillie Street
Assemblies of God	Harvest Christian Church	17 Florence Street
Church of Christ		91 River Road
Jehovah Witness	Kingdom Hall	23 Dimboola Road
Lutheran	Holy Trinity Lutheran Church	Cnr Baillie St and McPherson St
Latter-day Saints		154 Baillie Street
Presbyterian		16 Kalkee Road
Roman Catholic	Ss Ss Michael & John's Catholic Church	13 McLachlan Street
Salvation Army		12 Kalkee Road
Uniting Church		10 Pynsent St

The Horsham Ministers Association established the Christian Emergency Food Centre on Firebrace Street and help organise the annual Carols by Candlelight. The Lutheran Church oversees a local school (Holy Trinity Lutheran College) and nursing home (Sunnyside Nursing Home) and maintains a Christian bookshop, Jacob's Well.

A Sunni mosque was built on Stawell Road in October 2014.

=== Service clubs and other clubs (non-sporting) ===
The combined local services club host a free community breakfast on Australia Day. Local clubs include the Apex Club of Horsham, the City of Horsham Lions Club, the Horsham Combined Probus Club, the Horsham East Ladies Probus Club, Horsham Senior Citizens, the Lions Club of Horsham, the Rotary Club of Horsham and the Rotary Club of Horsham East.

=== Sport ===
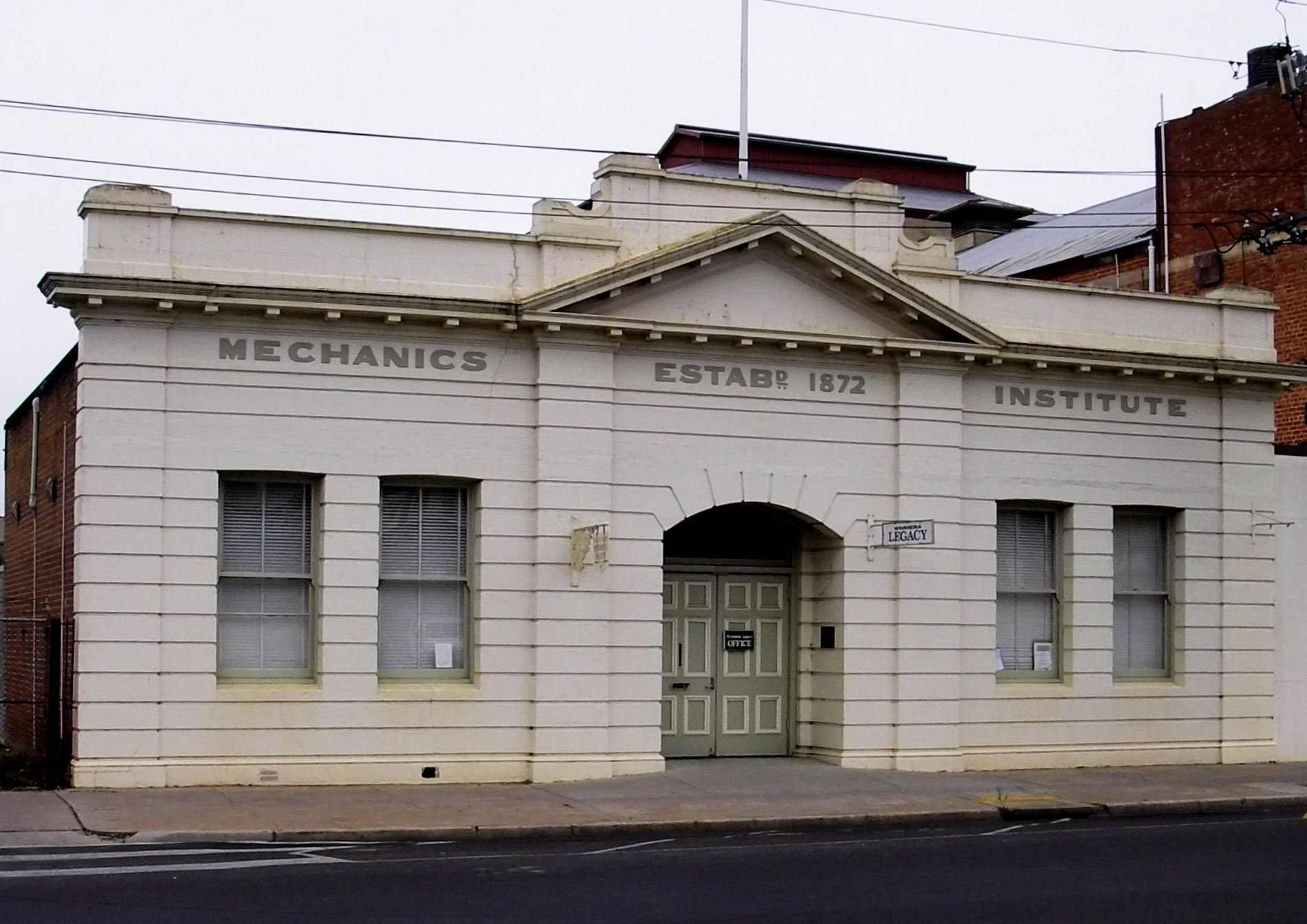
Former Horsham Mechanics Institute, now the Legacy building

Sport and fitness are popular pastimes in Horsham. The Horsham Aquatic Centre contains an indoor and outdoor pool, gym, kiosk and child care centre, owned by the Horsham Rural City Council and operated by the YMCA. Horsham has an outdoor velodrome, indoor squash centre and basketball stadium. The City Oval located between Baker St and Hocking St next to the botanical gardens hosts a variety of football games and cricket matches. Cricket and tennis are the most popular summer sports in Horsham.

The Wimmera Regional Sports Assembly Inc. is a volunteer based organisation established to support the growth, development and promotion of sport and recreation at the grass roots level.

The assembly provides a vital link between local clubs and state and national bodies. It has formed a solid partnership with Sport and Recreation Victoria and other strategic partners (including VicHealth, Local Government, and health agencies) to provide a quality service for Wimmera sports clubs and associations which encompasses the needs and priorities of the region. The assembly office in Horsham provides information and support on a variety of sports related topics.

Local sporting organisations include the Horsham Angling Club, the Horsham Badminton Association, the Horsham Hornets Basketball Club, Wimmera Kart Racing Club, Natimuk and District Gymnastics Club, Horsham Little Athletics Centre, Horsham Motor Sports Club, the Horsham Panthers Rugby League Club, the Horsham Volleyball Association, the Horsham Golf Club and the Drung Golf Club.

Other sports active in Horsham include: carpet bowls, hunting, karate, lawn bowls, netball, pistol shooting, rowing, smallbore rifle shooting, soccer, squash, swimming, table tennis, tennis, and water skiing.

==== Australian rules football ====
Former Sydney Swans footballer and 2014 Australian of the Year Adam Goodes grew up in Horsham and the town currently has four players representing the town in the Australian Football League (AFL). The two local football and netball leagues are overseen by AFL Wimmera Mallee.

===== Wimmera Football & Netball League =====
The town has two Australian rules football teams competing in the Wimmera Football League

- Horsham Demons
- Horsham Saints

==== Clay target shooting ====
The Central Wimmera Clay Target Club holds clay target shooting competitions twice a month at 1 pm on the 1st Sunday & 2nd Saturday of each month. Practice shoots for newcomers are held 1st & 3rd Fridays each month.

==== Cricket ====
The Horsham Cricket Association has four clubs based in the Horsham.

- Homers Cricket Club
- Horsham Saints Cricket Club
- Colts Cricket Club
- Jung Tigers Cricket Club

===== Wimmera Girls Cricket League =====
The Wimmera Girls Cricket League (WGCL) inaugural season was held in early 2020. Season 2020/21 provided a competition aimed at girls aged 10 to 17 years.

==== Flying and gliding ====
The Horsham Flying Club is the home of sport aviation and gliding in the Wimmera Mallee region of Victoria. The club was formed in 1963 as Wimmera Soaring Club and later amalgamated with Wimmera Sports Aircraft Association. The city also hosts the longest-running gliding competition in Australia, Horsham Week, held yearly in the first week of February since 1967.

==== Greyhound racing ====
Horsham Greyhound Racing Club has held regular greyhound racing meetings at the Horsham Showgrounds since 17 December 1973.

==== Harness racing (trots) ====
Horsham Harness Racing Club conducts regular meetings at its racetrack in the city.

==== Thoroughbred horse racing (gallops) ====
The Wimmera Racing Club, schedules around five race meetings a year in Horsham, including the Horsham Cup meeting in October.

==== Horsham Gift ====
There was a Horsham Gift in 1876 and was it won by a local runner, Charlie Smith. The Horsham Athletic Club's annual Boxing Day Carnival commenced in 1881 with the main event initially being the 130 yards Horsham Handicap and was held at the Horsham Showgrounds. The Horsham Gift was revived in 1926 after being in recess for many years. Previous winners were -

Horsham Gift Winners
Year	Winner	City (from)	Handicap	Time (secs)
	Horsham Handicap			
1881	?			
1882	G Smith	Horsham	10.50 yards	12.00
1883	D McArthur		9.00	13.00
	Christmas Gift			
1884	A Trinder		3.50	13.1/2
1885	A Drummond		14.00	12.1/2
1886	W Arthur		14.00	12.3/4
1887	G Smith		9.50	11.3/4
1888	A E Trinder	Ballarat	14.00	11.4/5
1889	G Levitzke		12.00	34.00(300 yards)
	Horsham Gift			
1890	W E Joy	Dunnolly	12.00	
1891	James Robertson	Balmoral	14.00	10.1/4
1892	D L McRae	Tooan	10.00	12.1/2
1893	J Tredrea	Hamilton	12.00	12.3/4
1894	P A O'Brien	Donald	14.00	12.2/5
1895-1925				In recess
1926	J A Davidson	Albert Park		12.3/16
1927	Harry Simpson	Moonee Ponds	9.25	12.2/16
1928	W A MacDonald	Deniliquin	7.50	12.00
1929-1946				In recess
1947	A C Martin		4.25	12.3/10
1948	J I Rigby	Malvern	8.50	12.1
1949	Jim Smith	Hawksburn		12.0
1950	Eric Cumming	Acheron		
1951	Harold Martin		2.75	12.4
8.4.67				
1968	Steve Ward	Flemington	7.75	12.0
29.3.69				
1970	John Brimacombe		7.25	12.00
1971	Geoff Willcox		5.75	11.9
1972	Brendan Wilson	Adelaide	8.75	12.2

== Infrastructure ==
The city provides community and family support services.

=== Education ===
The Workingmen's College was open from 1891 to 1922. The original buildings of the Workingmen's College became Horsham High School in 1912, the high school moved to the current site on Dimboola Road in 1926. Public primary school education was conducted at the Central School until 1955 when another primary campus was added in the west. A third primary school was added in 1965 in the north. A Roman Catholic primary school was established in 1883 and a Lutheran primary school was established in 1978. Technical education was re-introduced as part of the Horsham High School curriculum in 1959 and the nearby Longernong Agricultural College opened in 1889 at Dooen.

==== Kindergarten ====
Non-integrated three and four year old kindergarten programs in Horsham are managed by Emerge Early Years Services.

Integrated day care and kindergarten programs are managed by the individual facilities.

==== Primary education ====
- Holy Trinity Lutheran College: independent, Lutheran, co-educational, years prep to 12. Founded in 1978 and governed by a council elected from the congregation of Holy Trinity Lutheran Church.
- Horsham Primary School (298 and Rasmussan campuses): public, co-educational, prep to 6.
- Horsham West and Haven Primary School: public, co-educational, prep to 6.
- Saints Michael and John's Primary School: independent, Roman Catholic, co-educational, prep to 6.

==== Secondary education ====
- Holy Trinity Lutheran College: independent, Lutheran, co-educational, prep to 12. Founded in 1978 and governed by a council elected from the congregation of Holy Trinity Lutheran Church
- Horsham College: public, co-educational, 7 to 12. formerly known as both (Horsham Technical School) and (Horsham High School) before merging to become Horsham College in 1994
- St Brigid's College: independent, Roman Catholic, co-educational, 7 to 12.

==== Tertiary and trades education ====
- Federation University: Wimmera campus, tertiary education and trade courses.
- Longerenong College: often abbreviated to "Longy", agricultural tertiary college focusing on agronomy, rural merchandise management, wool classing, agricultural education, farm management, research and livestock sales.

=== Transport ===
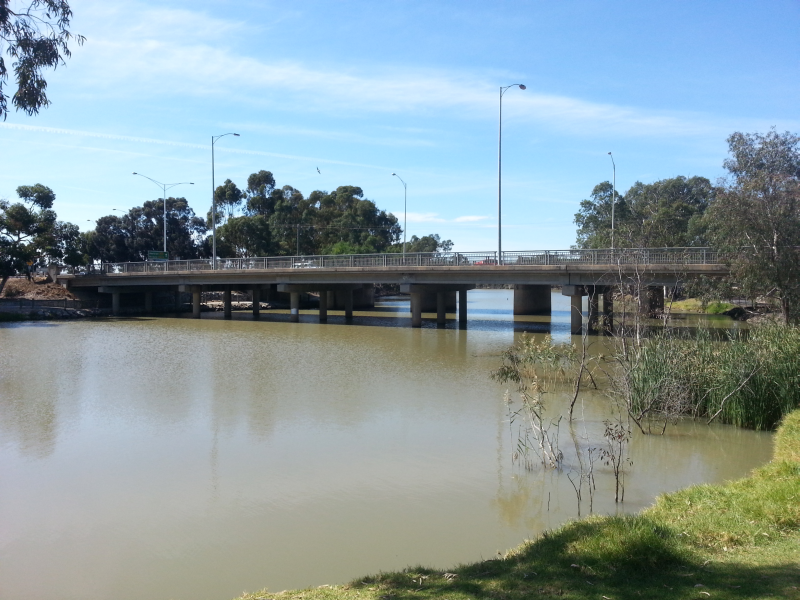
Western Highway crossing the Wimmera River

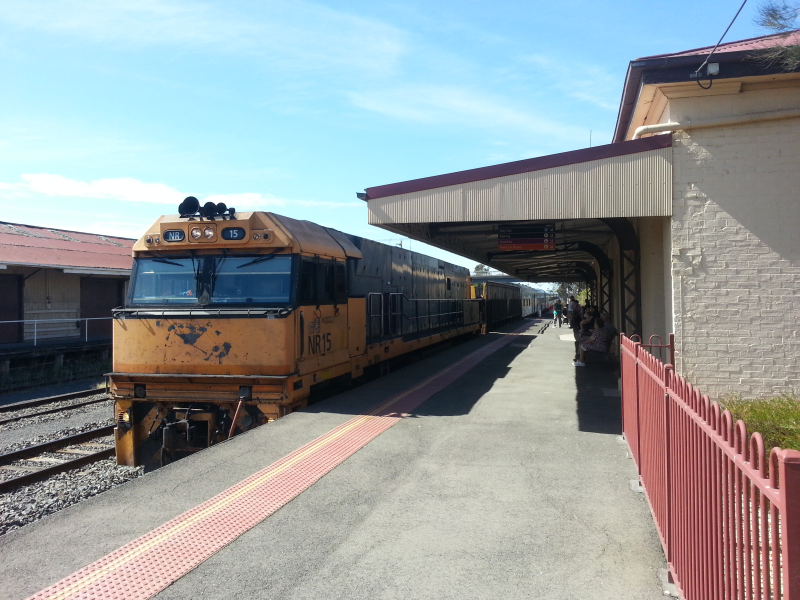
The Overland train is stopping on route from Melbourne to Adelaide

Road transport and the motor vehicle is the main form of transport. The Western Highway (connecting Melbourne to Adelaide) is the most significant road system in the city. It connects with the Henty Highway (A200) (from Portland north towards Mildura) cross paths with the Wimmera Highway on the eastern side of the central business district, The Western Highway will eventually be diverted around the city in a bypass. The Wimmera-Henty Highway (B200) is the main northern road, connecting Horsham to Warracknabeal and the Sunraysia Highway (B220) to Mildura as well as the Wimmera Highway (B240) and St Arnaud. The Wimmera Highway continues west to Naracoorte, South Australia.

Rail transport includes both passenger rail and freight rail. The city's only passenger station is Horsham railway station which is on the Melbourne–Adelaide railway is located approximately four blocks (1 km) north of the CBD. The Overland operates between the state capitals and stops in Horsham twice a week in each direction for passengers. While there is no direct connection to the Victorian broad gauge rail network, there are plans to increase the frequency of rail services between Ararat and Melbourne, and eventually improve the rail services to Horsham itself. Interstate freight trains regularly travel through Horsham to the Wimmera Intermodal Freight Terminal located nearby in Dooen.

V/Line operates a coach service into Horsham from Ararat and onward to Nhill. Melbourne bound passengers then board a train in Ararat to continue their journey. The 'Wimmera Roadways and Horsham Bus Lines' provide six routes through the city. Along with the bus service two taxi companies operate from a depot at 30 Wawunna Road.

The Horsham Airport is located to the north of the city and hosts a variety of private aviation companies as well a depot for the Royal Flying Doctors Service.

=== Utilities ===
Water and waste-water services are provided by Grampians Wimmera Mallee Water (GWMWater), "a government-owned statutory corporation established in 2004" who manage water services for most north-western Victoria. Horsham's primary water source is Lake Wartook, with a bore field at Laharum providing a supplementary supply source for the town when water levels are low. Electricity is provided to Horsham via the Horsham Terminal Station, operated by Powercor Australia and located to the east of the city on the corner of Riverside East and Horsham-Lubeck Roads.

== Health and healthcare services ==
The Wimmera Base Hospital on Baillie street has been managed by Wimmera Health Care Group since 1995 and was amalgamated with Ballarat Health Services, Stawell Regional Health and Edenhope and District Memorial Hospital to form Grampians Health, November 1, 2021. The hospital is also a regional training facility, and along with ordinary hospital operations provides a range of outpatient and community health support services. Horsham also contains a number of nursing homes, several pharmacies, two medical surgeries, two dental surgeries and various allied health services. The Australian Bureau of Statistics reports the median age of Horsham is older than the national average with just over 20% of the population over 65 years old.

== Economy ==
Healthcare, education and government related are the main employers in Horsham, although the largest number of businesses in 2017 were agriculture, forestry and fishing related, and the median income is $40,245 (2013). The Wimmera Development Association is based in Horsham, they gather economic data, lobby for improved infrastructure, organise events and encourage connections between local businesses and civic leaders. The Victorian Regional Development Association is represented locally by the Wimmera Southern Mallee Regional Partnership.

=== Commercial ===
According to the Australian Bureau of Statistics, most businesses in Horsham have fewer than four employees, with only 35 businesses employing 20 or more people. There are over a hundred retail outlets in Horsham of varying sizes, many independent, but some part of larger national or international chains. Horsham has sand mines, which have 35 years leases. And mcCain's foods, is looking at building a chip factory with 30 million dollars invested in the area

=== Foundry ===
The Horsham Foundry formerly operated by CMI Horsham was closed in July 2012.

=== Grains Innovation Park ===
The Horsham Grains Innovation Centre was established in 1962 to breed wheat varieties for Victoria. The scope of research has become "a world leader in science and innovation...for barley, canola, field peas, lentils and chickpeas.” Today the complex also hosts the Australian Grains Genebank, the Horsham Incident Control Centre service and depots for Agriculture Victoria, Department of Environment, Land, Water and Planning and the Victorian Fisheries Authority.

=== Renewable energy ===
The Murra Warra Wind Farm project is located 25 kilometres (16 mi) north of Horsham at Murra Warra, a 99-turbine producing 434 megawatts of electricity is being constructed with stage 1 completed in mid-2019. Renewable Energy Systems and Macquarie Capital are providing the $750 million equity for the project.

=== Tourism ===
The city is a significant stop-over point between Adelaide and Melbourne and contains nearly a dozen motels. West of Horsham is Mount Arapiles, south of Horsham are the Grampians National Park, northwest is the Little Desert National Park and north of Horsham the Silo Art Trail begins in Brim. The Wimmera River and its annual Fishing Competition are notable features of the city.

=== Wheat and wool ===
By 1910 Horsham sat on the boundary between Victoria's primary wool-producing area, the south-west and the state's second-largest wheat-producing area the Wimmera. Wheat is one of Australia's largest agricultural exports with the Wimmera and Mallee regions producing between 10 and 40 tonnes of wheat per square kilometre. Farmers around Horsham often rotate wheat with canola and legumes.

== Notable people ==
VFL / AFL Footballers

The following footballers played with Horsham Demons FNC, prior to playing senior football in the VFL/AFL, and / or drafted, with the year indicating their VFL/AFL debut.

Horsham Demons FNC

- 1906 – George Curran: South Melb
- 1906 – Gerald Ryan: Essendon
- 1908 – Jack Turnbull: North Melb
- 1924 – Jim Shanahan: Collingwood
- 1909 – Jack Brake: University
- 1925 – George Waterhouse: Sth Melb
- 1929 – Alex Doyle: Carlton
- 1929 – Bernie O'Brien: Footscray
- 1933 – George Bell: Essendon
- 1933 – Alex Lee: Hawthorn
- 1950 – Jim Norman: Geelong
- 1951 – Jack Hartigan: Hawthorn
- 1952 – Sid Smith: Geelong
- 1957 – Ray Harrip: Geelong
- 1957 – Robert Norman: Collingwood
- 1959 – Kevin Dellar: Essendon
- 1961 – Bob Miller: Melbourne
- 1961 – Doug Wade: Geelong
- 1962 – Colin Sleep: Fitzroy
- 1963 – Des Bethke: South Melb
- 1968 – Darryl Schwarz: Melbourne
- 1969 – Bryan Pirouet: Essendon
- 1972 – Peter Hickmott: Essendon
- 1973 – Robert Amos: Essendon
- 1974 – Howard Staehr: Essendon
- 1977 – Shane Heard: Essendon
- 1987 – Craig Sholl: North Melb
- 1992 – Adrian Hickmott: Geelong
- 1993 – Brad Sholl: North Melb
- 1998 – Adam Goodes: Sydney
- 2003 – Luke Brennan: Hawthorn
- 2012 – Sebastian Ross: St Kilda
- 2013 – Brett Goodes: Footscray
- 2014 – Jake Lloyd: Sydney
- 2022 – Ben Hobbs: Essendon

Horsham Saints FNC

- 2016 – Darcy Tucker: Fremantle
- 2017 – Jarrod Berry: Brisbane Lions
- 2019 – Tom Berry: Brisbane Lions
- 2024 – Joel Freijah: Footscray

Other Sports Figures

- Kevin Magee (motorcyclist), Professional Motorcycle Racer aka "The Horsham Hurricane".
- Geoff Gourlay, former Rugby Union player
- Jason Niblett, cyclist, Commonwealth Wealth Games gold medalist
- Mark O'Brien, Australian Cyclist
- Chloe Bibby, WNBA basketball player for the Minnesota Lynx
- Mitch Creek, basketball player for Romanian club U-BT Cluj-Napoca and former NBA player
- Aaron Bruce, former NBL and NCAA basketball player for Baylor University
- Shaun Bruce, NBL1 North basketball player for the Cairns Marlins
- Jannik Blair, member of Australia men's national wheelchair basketball team
- Melissa Sinfield, former WNBL basketball player

Other Locals

- Patrick Carnegie Simpson (1865–1947), missionary, professor, moderator of the Presbyterian Church of England (1928)
- Chris Crewther, Member for Mornington in the Victorian Parliament, and former Member for Dunkley in the Australian Parliament (including Chair of both Parliament's Foreign Affairs & Aid Sub-Committee, and the Government's Home Affairs & Legal Affairs Policy Committee)
- Portia de Rossi (born Amanda Rogers), actress
- Lajos Kazár, Hungarian linguist
- Alex Rathgeber, actor
- Jen Storer, children's author
- Pauline Toner (1935–1989), first female Victorian Cabinet minister

== See also ==
- Horsham Airport
- Horsham railway station, Victoria
- Ararat & District Football Association
