= Horsham Football Club =

Horsham

Names
- Full name: Horsham Football & Netball Club
- Nickname: Demons

Club details
- Founded: 1872; 154 years ago
- Colours
- Competition: Wimmera Football League
- Premierships: (34): 1906, 1907, 1911, 1913, 1919, 1924, 1932, 1938, 1960, 1962, 1967, 1968, 1970, 1972, 1974, 1976, 1979, 1981, 1982, 1989, 1990, 2003, 2004, 2005, 2006, 2007, 2008, 2009, 2010, 2011, 2012, 2014, 2017, 2018
- Ground: Horsham City Oval

Uniforms
Home

Other information
- Official website: Horsham Demons FNC

The Horsham Football & Netball Club, nicknamed the Demons, is an Australian rules football and netball club based in the city of Horsham, Victoria. The football team competes in the Wimmera Football League (WFL).

== History ==
The Horsham Football Club was formed in 1872 and this 1878 reference has the player profiles details of both the Horsham and Horsham Union Football Clubs.

Horsham were one of three foundation clubs which joined the Wimmera District Football Association in 1902 and have played in the Wimmera Football League since its formation in 1937.

Despite claiming only three premierships before 1960, Horsham has become easily the most successful club in the WFL, winning an unprecedented ten successive flags from 2003 to 2012.

== Football Premierships ==
Senior Football

- Rauert - Rintoule Trophy
  - 1889
- Sprague Trophy
  - 1890
- James Lang Trophy
  - 1890
- Dimboola Licensed Victuallers Trophy
  - 1901
- Wimmera District Football Association
  - 1906 - 1st
  - 1907 - 1st
  - 1913 - Horsham: 6.11 - 47 d Ararat: 5.7 - 37
- Rainbow Dimboola Medals
  - 1911 - Horsham: 18.22 - 130 d Jeparit: 5.6 - 36
- Horsham Returned Soilders & Sailors Football Association
  - 1919
- Wimmera Football League
  - 1924
  - 1932, 1938
  - 1960, 1962, 1967, 1968
  - 1970, 1972, 1974, 1976, 1979
  - 1981, 1982, 1989
  - 1990
  - 2003, 2004, 2005, 2006, 2007, 2008, 2009
  - 2010, 2011, 2012, 2014, 2017, 2018

Reserves

- Central Wimmera FL
  - 1948
- Wimmera Football League
  - 1977, 1979, 1980, 1982, 1984, 1988, 1990, 1997, 2000, 2004, 2011, 2013, 2022

Thirds

- ?

== League Best and Fairest ==
Seniors

Wimmera Football League

- 1974 - Peter Wood
- 1992 - Peter Morrison
- 1983 - Peter Light
- 1984 - Peter Light
- 1987 - Andrew Johns
- 1999 - Matt Glare
- 2004 - Scott Batchelor
- 2006 - Cameron Penny
- 2009 - Marcus Anson
- 2015 - Billy Lloyd
- 2018 - Ryan Kemp

Reserves

== Netball Premierships ==
A. Grade

- ?

B. Grade

- ?

C. Grade

- ?

C. Reserve

- ?

== VFL / AFL players ==
The following footballers played with Horsham Demons FNC, prior to playing senior football in the VFL/AFL, and / or drafted, with the year indicating their VFL/AFL debut.

- 1906 - George Curran: South Melb
- 1906 - Gerald Ryan: Essendon
- 1908 - Jack Turnbull: North Melb
- 1909 - Jack Brake: University
- 1924 - Jim Shanahan: Collingwood
- 1925 - George Waterhouse: S Melb
- 1929 - Alex Doyle: Carlton
- 1933 - George Bell: Essendon
- 1933 - Alex Lee: Hawthorn
- 1950 - Jim Norman: Geelong
- 1951 - Jack Hartigan: Hawthorn
- 1952 - Sid Smith: Geelong
- 1957 - Ray Harrip: Geelong
- 1957 - Robert Norman: Collingwood
- 1959 - Kevin Dellar: Essendon
- 1961 - Bob Miller: Melbourne
- 1961 - Doug Wade: Geelong
- 1962 - Colin Sleep: Fitzroy
- 1963 - Des Bethke: South Melb
- 1968 - Darryl Schwarz: Melbourne
- 1969 - Bryan Pirouet: Essendon
- 1972 - Peter Hickmott: Essendon
- 1973 - Robert Amos: Essendon
- 1974 - Howard Staehr: Essendon
- 1977 - Shane Heard: Essendon
- 1987 - Craig Sholl: North Melb
- 1992 - Adrian Hickmott: Geelong
- 1993 - Brad Sholl: North Melb
- 1998 - Adam Goodes: Sydney
- 2003 - Luke Brennan: Hawthorn
- 2012 - Sebastian Ross: St Kilda
- 2014 - Jake Lloyd: Sydney
- 2022 - Ben Hobbs: Essendon

Western Australian Football League

- 1902 - James Gullan: East Fremantle

The following footballers played senior VFL / AFL football prior to playing and / or coaching with Horsham with the year indicating their first season at Horsham FNC.

- 1899 - Teddy Holligan: Geelong
- 1906 - Jim Anderson: Essendon
- 1928 - Jack O'Rourke: Fitzroy
- 1938 - Jack Beveridge: Collingwood
- 1939 - Dan Murray: Fitzroy
- 1939 - Bernie O'Brien: Footscray
- 1946 - Bill Roberts: Essendon
- 1949 - Frank Hanna: Melbourne
- 1950 - Jack Blackman: Hawthorn
- 1960 - Colin Wilson: Melbourne
- 1966 - Gary Hamer: Geelong

Australian Rugby Union Representative

- 1947 - Geoff Gourlay
