= Dean Hartigan =

Australian rules footballer (born 1954)

Personal information
- Full name: Dean Hartigan
- Born: 23 August 1954 (age 72)
- Original team: Horsham
- Height: 180 cm (5 ft 11 in)
- Weight: 73 kg (161 lb)
- Position: Back pocket

Playing career^{1}
Years	Club	Games (Goals)
1974–1977	Essendon	36 (1)
- ^{1} Playing statistics correct to the end of 1977.

Dean Hartigan (born 23 August 1954) is a former Australian rules footballer who played with Essendon in the Victorian Football League (VFL).

== Biography ==
=== Essendon career ===
Hartigan, a recruit from Horsham, started out in the Essendon Under 19s, which he joined in 1972. He got called up to the seniors for the first time in the 1974 VFL season. Aged 19, Hartigan was one of three Essendon players to debut against St Kilda in round 15, most famous of the trio being Simon Madden. He did not miss a game for the rest of the year in an encouraging start to his career and continued his sequence by playing in the first 10 rounds of the 1975 season. In round 14, an 80-point loss to Carlton at Windy Hill, Hartigan was knocked unconscious by Phillip Pinnell during a second quarter brawl in which eight players were put on report. A back pocket player, Hartigan finished the 1975 season with 15 games. He played much of 1976 in the Essendon reserves and won the club's best and fairest award, but still put together 10 senior games. In 1977, his final season, Hartigan played just three league games.

=== Later career ===
From 1978 to 1981, Hartigan played for Coburg in the Victorian Football Association (VFA). He was a back pocket in Coburg's 1979 premiership winning team. In 1980 he was a VFA representative and played in the Coburg side which lost to Port Melbourne the grand final.

He left Coburg in 1982 to captain-coach Seddon, then from 1983 to 1987 captain-coached Aberfeldie.

=== Family ===
Hartigan was not the first member of his family to play VFL football. His father, Jack Hartigan, played for Hawthorn and St Kilda in the 1950s.

Brent Hartigan, his son, played for Richmond from 2004 to 2006.
