= Lajos Kazár =

Hungarian linguist (1924–1998)

Lajos Kazár AM
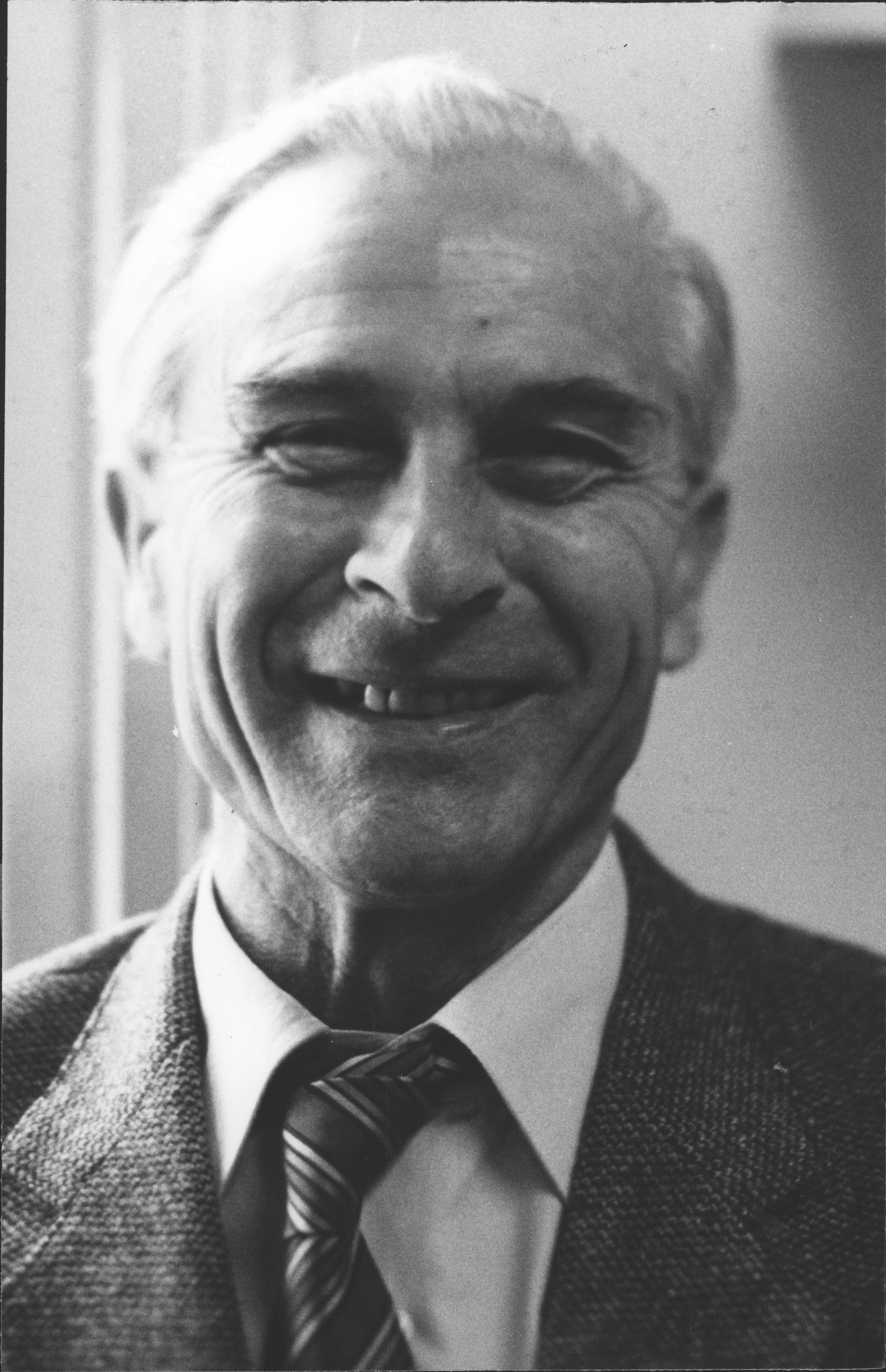
- Dr. Kazár in 1984
- Born: 1924; Meggyeskovácsi, Vas County, Hungary
- Died: 31 March 1998 (aged 73–74); Meggyeskovácsi, Hungary
- Education: Australian National University, Indiana University Bloomington, University of Hamburg
- Spouse: Margarete Jung
- Scientific career
- Fields: Linguistics
- Workplaces: Australian National University, Indiana University Bloomington

Lajos Kazár (1924–1998) was a Hungarian linguist.

== Early life ==
Lajos Kazár was born in 1924 in Balozsameggyes, Vas County, Hungary, into a poor family as the son of a blacksmith. After graduating with honors from the Királyi State Ferenc Faludi High School in Szombathely, he continued his studies in Kassán. At the beginning of 1945, due to the war, he was displaced to Germany and was only able to resume his studies in 1947–48.

== Life in Australia ==
In the fall of 1949, he emigrated with his wife, Margarete Jung, the widow of Karl Leopold von Möller, to Australia. There, he worked in factories and on his own farm in Horsham, Victoria, until 1963. In 1966, he completed four years of Oriental Studies at The Australian National University in Canberra, majoring in Chinese and Japanese languages, Asian civilization, and general linguistics. Between 1970 and 1974, he studied at the Department of Uralic and Altaic Studies at Indiana University. From 1974 to 1977, he worked and conducted research in Austria and the United States, including at the library of Lajos Szathmáry in Chicago.

He then continued his studies at the University of Hamburg's Japanese Department with a scholarship from the German Research Foundation, where he remained until the fall of 1982 and published most of his findings. He wrote his dissertation at Indiana University Bloomington on the topic of Japanese-Uralic linguistic relations (Uralic-Japanese linguistic relations: A preliminary investigation, 1974; [Uralic-Japanese linguistic relations: preparatory investigation]). In 1982, he returned to Canberra, and from the following year until 1993, he served as a lecturer and researcher in the Linguistics Department of The Australian National University's Research School of Pacific Studies.

== Return to Hungary ==
He returned to Hungary in June 1993 and founded the Japanese Research Center (now known as the Japanese Research Centre) in Pécs, located in what is now the PTE library. The center ceased to exist after Kazár's death due to a lack of financial support. After moving back to Hungary, he focused primarily on creating dictionaries and translating Japanese grammar books. He was a strong advocate for the promotion of Japanese studies in Hungary and the establishment of a Japanese department. Upon returning, he lived with his wife in Piliscsaba for a time. When he fell ill, he moved back to his native village, where he was cared for by his sister until his death.

== Career ==
The professional assessment of his linguistic work is controversial. His primary field of research was the origin and classification of the Japanese language, though he also produced significant translations. He published his studies and findings in numerous journals and books. His work appeared in well-known publications such as Uralica (Tokyo), the Bulletin of the European Association for Japanese Studies (London), Ural-Altaische Jahrbücher, and Asian Profile (Hong Kong). After returning to Hungary, his writings were featured in various domestic magazines and anthologies. He received several scholarships for his research and presented his theories at scientific symposia both abroad and in Hungary, including the 1980 International Symposium on the Genetic Relationships of the Japanese Language held at Kyoto Sangyo University. In 1997, he defended his position in a debate organized by the Hungarian Linguistics Society.

He is credited with translating the Kojiki, the earliest Japanese chronicle, into Hungarian. This was the sixth translation of the Kojiki into a foreign language, following translations into Chinese, English, Italian, French, and German. Another major focus of his research was the history of Transylvania, where he made significant contributions. Much of his work on this topic was devoted to describing Transylvania and critiquing the Dacian-Roman continuity theory. His arguments against this theory are presented in his work Facts Against Fiction: Transylvania – Homeland of the Wallachians/Romanians, in which he highlighted errors about Transylvania found in foreign encyclopedias.

=== Japanese-Uralic language comparison ===
The largest part of his work focused on exploring the possible Uralic relationship of the Japanese language. He hypothesized that the Japanese language shares similarities with the languages of the Uralic language family. His theory, titled Japanese-Uralic Language Comparison: Locating Japanese Origins with the Help of Samoyed, Finnish, Hungarian, etc.: An Attempt, is explained in his research. In this work, he compares around six hundred Japanese words with Uralic words, drawing from Finnish, Samoyed, and Hungarian languages, among others. He presents a total of 594 etymological suggestions and 30 morphological parallels.

In 1997, he published Japanese-Uralic Language Comparison: A Substantially Abbreviated Summary in Japanese, English, German, and Hungarian. As noted in the introduction, the volume provides a simplified ethnographic-linguistic (ethnolinguistic) selection with a few additions, drawn from the findings he had previously published in his earlier work.

In his studies on the hypothesis, Kazár briefly reviews the most important foreign and Hungarian scholars who have linked Japanese to the Uralic (or Ural-Altaic) languages. He references, among others, the orientalist and linguist Gábor Bálint Szentkatolnai and the renowned Turkologist and orientalist Vilmos Pröhle, whose research pointed in the same direction. Their work can be considered a precursor to his own, although Kazár followed a different method. While Kazár began his research independently of Pröhle's work, he later built upon it. Toru Szenga, a Japanese historian and university professor teaching in Hungary, briefly compares Kazár's work with that of Pröhle and Gábor Bálint in the journal Magyar Nyelv.

Kazár viewed this as supporting evidence for his hypothesis. In his studies, he frequently references research conducted by Japanese geneticist Hideo Matsumoto in the 1980s, which suggests that the ancestors of the Japanese people, or at least a significant portion of them, may have migrated from the area around Lake Baikal to the present-day Japanese islands. Matsumoto's research also indicates a closer genetic relationship between the Japanese and the Buryat-Mongols.

In 1998, he briefly summarized the ideas linking Japanese with the Uralic languages, as well as the relevant scientific works, in a review. In this summary, he addresses the main counterarguments against his theory, discusses Japanese language similarities, and calls for further research in the "Japanese-Ural" direction.

In several of his studies, he advocates for the collaboration of experts in Altai and Uralic languages to further research on the affiliation of the Japanese language.

=== Reception ===
The majority of Hungarian linguists are skeptical of Kazár's works comparing Japanese and Uralic languages. Most criticisms argue that Kazár diverged from the Altaic hypothesis by placing Japanese in a kinship relationship with the Uralic language family, which raises methodological questions about his interpretations. American linguist and Altaist Roy Andrew Miller addressed this issue more thoroughly in his detailed critical analysis of Kazár's work, published in the American Association of Teachers of Japanese journal. Kazár responded to these objections in the 1984–85 issue of the same journal.

Miller critiques several aspects of Kazár's language comparison method, including the assertion that Japanese and Uralic languages can be compared without including Altaic languages. Kazár defends this approach by arguing that, while the Uralic language family is scientifically established, the common origin of languages classified in the Altaic group is not proven. In contrast, Miller argues that no "proven" language family exists, only hypothetical ones.

Linguist József Hegedűs, in his work Belief and Reality: Foreign and Domestic Views on the Kinship of the Hungarian Language, briefly describes Kazár's work and provides examples of his comparisons.

The Göttingen linguist István Futaky criticized Kazár's hypothesis in the journal Finnisch-Ugrische Mitteilungen, which he edited himself. Among his objections is the claim that "Kazár simplifies the two-syllable stems reconstructed into the Uralic-Finno-Ugric base language into monosyllabic ones." Kazár briefly addresses this by stating: "It is widely accepted in Uralic linguistics that words in the Uralic base language were predominantly two-syllable, ending in a vowel, with very few exceptions. [...] This proposition is clearly contradicted by the existence of many similar, one-syllable words in the Uralic languages." He cites the Hungarian word fa and the Samoyed word pa (meaning 'tree') as examples.

Another counterargument against his interpretations is that "he does not specify which of the meanings of Japanese words (which he sometimes provides with 3 to 9 different meanings) he considers to be the original (initial) meaning. For example: Japanese am.e, am.a- or Old Japanese am.a (meaning 'sky, rain, deity') compared to Finnish jumma (meaning 'god'), and Japanese at.aeru or Old Japanese at.ap.u (meaning 'gives, places near') compared to Finnish anta- (meaning 'give'), among others."

According to linguist László Grétsy, Kazár "investigated a connection between our language and Japanese, and, in the form of a dictionary, demonstrated the many similarities between the two languages."

According to a blog that discusses the issue in several posts, the Uralist linguist Koizumi Tamotsu from Japan expresses doubts about Kazár's theory in his work Jomongo no Hakken (Tokyo, 1998), although he does not categorically reject it.

Criticisms of his theory can be roughly summarized as follows: possible methodological errors due to the omission of Altaic languages, issues regarding the age of Old Japanese and Uralic languages, and, in some cases, a lack of clarity regarding the basic meanings.

Until now, there has been no in-depth, detailed evaluation of his work.

=== Translations ===
His significant achievement is the translation of the Kojiki, the ancient Japanese chronicle and collection of religious texts, into Hungarian. This translation was first published in Sydney in 1982 by the Hungarian Historical Society. Although the second edition has the same publication data as the first, the preface suggests it was likely published in Budapest. (The "Foreword to the Hungarian Edition" on page 3 ends with a Budapest date of 1993.) According to the volume's introduction, the "basic material used for the translation was the complete, new, and annotated Chinese edition of the Old Japanese text by Kinoshita."

He also utilized the German translation prepared by Professor Kinoshita Ivao, as well as the English translations by Basil Hall Chamberlain, Donald L. Philippi, and Karl Florenz, focusing mainly on their explanations and theoretical sections. At the beginning of the book, he describes in detail the origins and characteristics of the Kojiki, as well as the circumstances and background of the Hungarian translation. He translated and supplemented Wolfgang Hadamitzky's popular handbook on the Japanese writing system, which was also published several times in Hungary (Kanji és Kana: Handbook and Dictionary of the Japanese Writing System, by Wolfgang Hadamitzky and Lajos Kazár). Additionally, he translated The History of Japan, written by professors at the Australian National University, into Hungarian.

== Death ==
He died on 31 May 1998, in Hungary, after a short illness.

== Personal life ==
Kazár married Margarete Jung, the widow of Karl Leopold von Möller.

== Legacy ==
Lajos Kazár's work is currently little known in the fields of Hungarian linguistics and Japanology, and his hypothesis regarding the origin of the Japanese language has primarily been addressed in American and German-language forums. He had to undertake the publication of a significant portion of his works in Hungary himself. Many of his translations, or substantial fragments thereof, remain in manuscript form. This includes his Hungarian translation of the successful Japanese language book Japanese for Everyone for native English speakers, as well as the renowned Dzidaibetsu Kokugo Daijiten (時代別国語大辞典) dictionary series, which divided the old Japanese language into eras for interpretive purposes. He also began translating his work on Japanese-Uralic language comparison into English, but his illness prevented him from completing it. His life’s work is commemorated in more detail on the website of his native village. His grave is located in the Balozsa cemetery in his native village.

== Main works and translations ==
- Japanese-Uralic Language Comparison: Locating Japanese Origins with the Help of Samoyed, Finnish, Hungarian, etc.: An Attempt (Hamburg, 1980, Tsurusaki Books, author's private publication)
- Kojiki – 'Records of Old Stories' (Subtitle: Japanese Prehistory) (translation, Hungarian Historical Society, Sydney, 1982)
- Transylvania in Pictures (Transylvanian Association of Canberra, 1990)
- Facts Against Fiction: Transylvania (Forum of History, Sydney, 1993)
- Kanji and Kana: A Handbook and Dictionary of the Japanese Writing System (translated and co-authored with Wolfgang Hadamitzky, Scholastica, 1995)
- Facts Against Fiction: Transylvania – Homeland of the Wallachians/Romanians BC. since 70? (Forum of History, Sydney, 1996)
- 日本語とハンガリー語は親類関係にあるか？ [Nihongo to Hangarīgo wa Shinrui Kankei ni Aru ka?] (parallel subtitles: Are Japanese and Hungarian Related? Sind Japanisch und Ungarisch Verwandt? Are the Japanese and Hungarian Languages Related?) (Tsurusaki Books – Daruszeg Books, Pécs, 1997)
- RHP Maison – JG Caiger: History of Japan (translation, Püski Publishing House, 2004)
