= Dan Murray (Australian footballer) =

Australian rules footballer

Personal information
- Full name: Daniel Thomas Murray
- Born: 19 December 1912; Colac, Victoria
- Died: 10 November 1992 (aged 79); Collingwood, Victoria
- Height: 178 cm (5 ft 10 in)
- Weight: 86 kg (190 lb)

Playing career^{1}
Years	Club	Games (Goals)
1933–1934	Fitzroy	18 (0)
1934–1938	Prahran (VFA)	59 (9)
1938–1945	Fitzroy	48 (4)
- ^{1} Playing statistics correct to the end of 1945.

Daniel Thomas Murray (19 December 1912 – 10 November 1992) was an Australian rules footballer who played for Fitzroy in the Victorian Football League (VFL).

== Family ==
The son of Thomas Joseph Murray (1875-1947), and Ellen Murray, née Cameron, née Grist (1874-1961), Daniel Thomas Murray was born at Colac, Victoria on 19 December 1912.

He married Eileen May Dowdle (1913-1998) in 1933. Their son, Kevin later played 300 games for Fitzroy (its only 300 game player) and was inducted into the Australian Football Hall of Fame as a legend.

== Football ==
Murray was a halfback and first appeared for Fitzroy in 1933. He left to play with Prahan from 1934 to 1938, then returned to Fitzroy in 1938. Murray was suspended for 10 weeks by the VFA Tribunal in June 1937 on a kicking charge, which resulted in him missing out on playing in Prahran's 1937 VFA premiership.

Murray was appointed as coach of the Horsham in early 1939, along with secure employment at the Horsham furniture store of Patersons Pty Ltd. (Note: The Victorian furniture retailer, Patersons Pty Ltd, had a long established practice of employing Australian Rules footballers as in-store salesmen: for instance, St Kilda's Bruce Phillips worked for a number of years at its Elsternwick store.)

Fitzroy refused to clear him. Murray played for Fitzroy in round one, but then informed Fitzroy officials that he would be staying in Horsham. Murray was forced to resign as coach of Horsham and was replaced by former Footscray player, Bernie O'Brien. Murray was finally cleared to Horsham in early July 1939.

Murray was appointed as coach of Horsham FC in November, 1939 for the 1940 season. In March 1940 Horsham FC decided to continue on for the season with Murray as coach at £5 per week.

After Horsham's 1940 season was shortened due to WW2, Murray returned to Melbourne to play the second half of the season with Fitzroy, after Horsham lost the Wimmera Football League preliminary final.

Murray continued to play with Fitzroy in the early 1940's and was a reserve in their 1944 VFL premiership side.

Murray was appointed to the Fitzroy FC committee in 1947 and was also their chairman of selector's.

Murray was captain-coach of Albury in 1948, losing the Ovens and Murray Football League grand final to North Albury. Murray returned to live in Melbourne in late September, 1948.

== Military service ==
Murray also served in the Royal Australian Air Force during World War II.
