= Alex Doyle =

Alex Doyle may refer to:

- Alexander Doyle (1857–1922), American sculptor
- Alex Doyle (Australian footballer) (1904–1973), Australian rules footballer
- Ally Doyle (born 1949), Northern Irish footballer, see List of Oldham Athletic A.F.C. players (25–99 appearances)
- Alex Doyle (footballer, born 2001), British footballer
