= Haven, Victoria =

Haven
- Town
- Coordinates: 36°45′S 142°11′E
- Country: Australia
- State: Victoria
- LGA: Rural City of Horsham
- Location: 5 km (3.1 mi) S of Horsham

Government
  - State electorate: Lowan
  - Federal division: Mallee

Population
  - Total: 1,443 (2021 census)
- Postcode: 3401

Haven is a town in the Wimmera region of Victoria, Australia about 5 km south of Horsham. At the 2021 census, it had a population of 1,443.

== History ==
Haven has a general store, a recreation reserve and a small primary school with approximately 100-150 students.

The Haven Post Office opened on 1 December 1911 and closed in 1985.

During the Black Saturday bushfires in February 2009, a fire enveloping the outskirts of Horsham threatened Haven; firefighters managed to save the general store, hall and school, despite flames coming within metres of those buildings.

The small town has a monthly market.

== Sport and recreation ==
The Haven Football Club was established in 1924 and played in the following football competitions -

- 1924 - Horsham South Football Association
- 1925 - 1928: Horsham Country Football Association
- 1939 - Horsham District Football League
- 1940 - 1946: In recess > World War Two
- 1947 - 1955: Horsham District Football League
- 1956 - The Haven FC folded in 1956.

The club played in two grand finals, securing a premiership in 1939 -

- 1926 - Longerenong College: 6.4 - 40 d Haven: 3.7 - 25
- 1939 - Haven: 9.5 - 59 d Armoured Car: 6.12 - 48

In 1953 Perc Eagle won the Horsham District Football League best and fairest award. Former Haven footballer, Kevin Dellar went onto play senior VFL football with Essendon.
