= Gerald J. Ryan =

Australian rules footballer

Gerald Ryan

Personal information
- Full name: Gerald John Ryan
- Born: 24 May 1887; Horsham, Victoria
- Died: 6 February 1917 (aged 29); Tidworth, Wiltshire, England
- Original team: Horsham
- Height: 178 cm (5 ft 10 in)
- Weight: 70 kg (154 lb)

Playing career^{1}
| Years | Club | Games (Goals) |
| 1906, 1909 | Essendon | 18 (3) |
- ^{1} Playing statistics correct to the end of 1909.

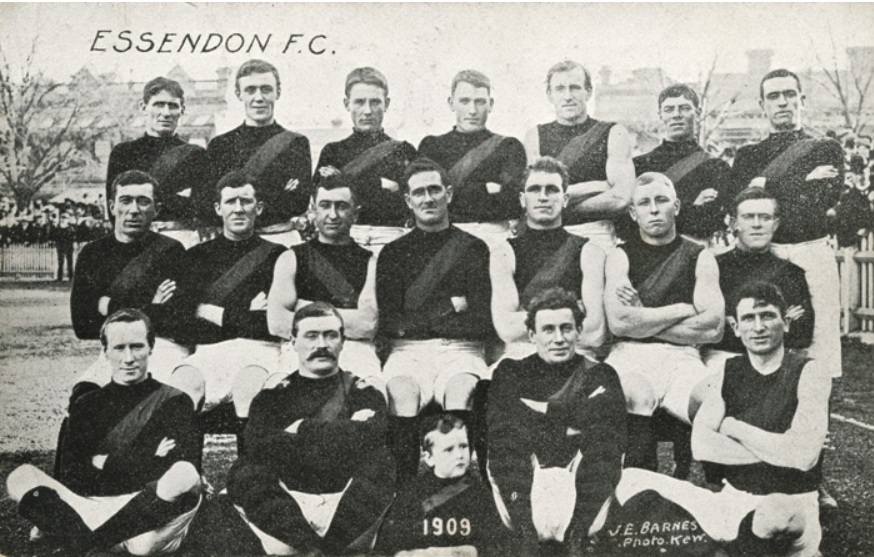
Essendon Football Club (1909): Ryan is second from left, back row.

Gerald John Ryan (24 May 1887 – 6 February 1917) was an Australian rules footballer who played with Essendon in the Victorian Football League.

== Family ==
The second son of George Ryan (1857-1920), and Bridget Ryan (1865-1946), née Carberry, Gerald Ryan was born at Horsham, Victoria on 24 May 1887.

== Military service ==
He enlisted in the First AIF in September 1914, and served overseas with the 14th Battalion.

== Death ==
He died from a fractured skull; an injury he sustained from a fall on ice, whilst walking near the Tidworth Military Hospitalin Wiltshire, England, where he was convalescing from wounds he had received in action in France.

He was buried with full military honours at Tidworth Camp Military Cemetery.

== See also ==
- List of Victorian Football League players who died on active service

== Sources ==
- Holmesby, Russell & Main, Jim (2007). The Encyclopedia of AFL Footballers. 7th ed. Melbourne: Bas Publishing.
- Main, J. & Allen, D., "Ryan, Gerald", pp.169-171 in Main, J. & Allen, D., Fallen – The Ultimate Heroes: Footballers Who Never Returned From War, Crown Content, (Melbourne), 2002. ISBN 978-1-7409-5010-7
- Maplestone, M., Flying Higher: History of the Essendon Football Club 1872–1996, Essendon Football Club, (Melbourne), 1996. ISBN 0-9591740-2-8
- "The Essendon Team (vs. Collingwood on 5 June 1909: photograph)", The Weekly Times, (Saturday, 12 June 1909), p. 27: Ryan is at extreme left of bottom row.
- First World War Embarkation Roll: Private Gerald Ryan (769), collection of the Australian War Memorial.
- First World War Nominal Roll: Lance Sergeant Gerald Ryan (769), collection of the Australian War Memorial.
- First World War Service Record: Lance Sergeant Gerald Ryan (769), National Archives of Australia.
- Australian Red Cross Society Wounded and Missing Enquiry Bureau Files, 1914-18 War: 769 Lance Sergeant Gerald Ryan, 14th Battalion, collection of the Australian War Memorial.
- Australian War Memorial Roll of Honour: Lance Sergeant Gerald Ryan (769), Australian War Memorial.
