= Longerenong College =

Agricultural college in Longerenong, Australia

Coordinates: 36.667°S 142.304°E

- Type: Agricultural college
- Established: 1889
- Affiliations: Skillinvest
- Principal: Jacinta Langdon
- Location: 229 Longerenong Rd, Longerenong , Victoria, Australia
- Campus: Rural
- Colours: Blue & Orange
- Nickname: Longy
- Website: longy.com.au

Longerenong College, often abbreviated Longy, is an agricultural college in western-Victoria near the city of Horsham, Victoria. The focus of study at the College is "agronomy, rural merchandise management, wool classing, agricultural education, farm management, research and livestock sales." The College is based around a residential campus in the locality of Longerenong. The college includes a 1070 hectare farm "with cropping, sheep and beef cattle enterprises."

== History ==
The college was founded in 1889 by the Council of Agricultural Education. Enrolments however were not sustained and the college was closed from 1898 to 1905, although the farm remained operational during that period. The original buildings were destroyed by fire in 1940 and students used temporary buildings until the 1960s, when new residences and assembly hall were built. In 1972 the college began accepting female students. Oversight of the college passed from the Department of Agriculture to the University of Melbourne in 1993 and then was transferred to Skillinvest in 2005.

== Notable alumni ==
- Peter Fisher, Australian Country Party politician.
- Leigh Nugent, Australian swimming coach.
