= Horsham Airport =

Airport in Horsham, Victoria, Australia

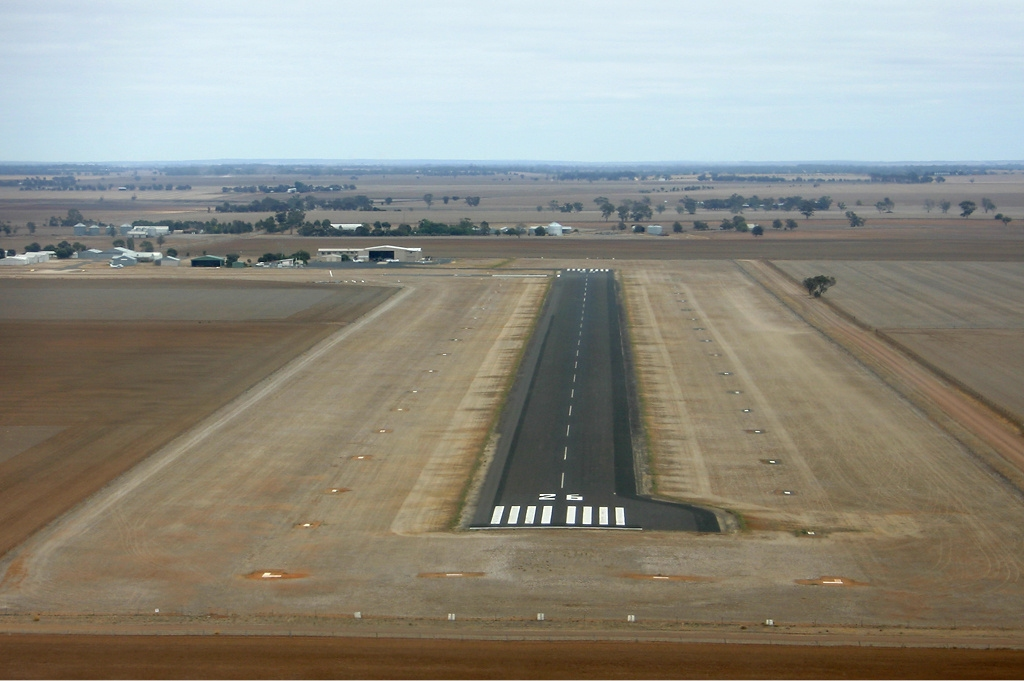
- IATA: HSM; ICAO: YHSM

Summary
- Airport type: Public
- Operator: Horsham Rural City Council
- Location: Horsham, Victoria
- Elevation AMSL: 445 ft / 136 m
- Coordinates: 36°40′11″S 142°10′22″E

Map
- Location in Victoria

Runways
| Direction | Length | | Surface |
| Direction | m | ft | Surface |
|---|---|---|---|
| 08/26 | 1,322 | 4,337 | Asphalt |
| 17/35 | 999 | 3,278 | asphalt |
- Sources: Australian AIP and aerodrome chart

Horsham Airport (IATA: HSM, ICAO: YHSM) is located 3 nautical miles (5.6 km; 3.5 mi) northwest of Horsham, Victoria, Australia. The terminal is called the "Wade Memorial Terminal". It is home to local aviation clubs; crop dusting firms; a DELWP air base to support fire-fighting and occasional military aircraft; The Horsham Aeromedical Transfer Station which includes two ambulance bays and services patients not just from Horsham, but from surrounding districts as well.

In 2021 a $211,000 upgrade took place, with works including: runway pavement reconstruction, new guidance lighting and the installation of a new backup power generator. The upgrades were made possible after Horsham Rural City Council successfully applied for and matched $105,591 in Federal Government funding which was announced in 2020.

== Gliding ==
The Horsham Flying Club hosts a gliding competition, Horsham Week, held yearly at the airport in the first week of February since 1967.

== See also ==
- List of airports in Victoria, Australia
