= Australian Tidy Town Awards =

Logo of Keep Australia Beautiful - Tidy Towns

The Australian Sustainable Communities Tidy Town Awards were launched in 1968 in Western Australia and are an initiative of Keep Australia Beautiful. These awards encourage, motivate and celebrate the achievements of rural and regional communities across Australia. Originally focused on litter reduction and civic pride, they now address the environmental, social and economic sustainability of local rural communities.

Year	Australia's most Sustainable Community
1990	Mount Tyson, Queensland
1991	Mount Gambier, South Australia
1992	Forbes, New South Wales
1993	Lucindale, South Australia
1994	Naracoorte, South Australia
1995	Kiama, New South Wales
1996	Stanley, Tasmania
1997	None awarded
1998	Denmark, Western Australia
1999	Goolwa, South Australia
2000	Batchelor, Northern Territory
2001	Horsham, Victoria
2002	Soldiers Point / Salamander Bay, New South Wales
2003	Wyalkatchem, Western Australia
2004	Port Vincent, South Australia
2005	Mount Gambier, South Australia
2006	Collie, Western Australia
2007	Swansea, Tasmania
2008	Toowoomba, Queensland
2009	Tamworth, New South Wales
2010	Beechworth, Victoria
2011	Lithgow, New South Wales
2012	Caloundra, Queensland
2013	Victor Harbor, South Australia
2014	Sheffield, Tasmania
2015	Toodyay, Western Australia
2016	Triabunna, Tasmania
2017	Barmera, South Australia
2018	Smithton, Tasmania
2019	Santa Teresa (Ltyentye Apurte), Northern Territory
2020	Beechworth, Victoria
2021	Hastings, Victoria
2022	King Island, Tasmania
2023	Gascoyne Junction, Western Australia
2024	Beechworth, Victoria
2025	Launceston, Tasmania
