= Wally O'Brien =

Australian rules footballer, born 1907

Personal information
- Full name: Walter Joseph O'Brien
- Born: 2 January 1907; Footscray, Victoria
- Died: 11 October 1983 (aged 76); Fitzroy, Victoria
- Height: 170 cm (5 ft 7 in)

Playing career^{1}
Years	Club	Games (Goals)
1929–31	Williamstown (VFA)	28 (12)
1931–34	Footscray	49 (2)
1935	Fitzroy	2 (0)
- ^{1} Playing statistics correct to the end of 1935.

Walter Joseph O'Brien (2 January 1907 – 11 October 1983) was an Australian rules footballer who played with Footscray and Fitzroy in the Victorian Football League (VFL). His brother, Bernie, also played for Footscray in the VFL.
