= Longerenong =

- Town
- Coordinates: 36°41′02″S 142°20′02″E
- Country: Australia
- State: Victoria
- LGAs: Rural City of Horsham; Shire of Yarriambiack

Government
  - State electorate: Lowan
  - Federal division: Mallee
- Elevation: 133 m (436 ft)

Population
  - Total: 237 (2021 census)
- Postcode: 3401
- Mean max temp: 21.5 °C (70.7 °F)
- Mean min temp: 7.9 °C (46.2 °F)
- Annual rainfall: 411.7 mm (16.21 in)

Longerenong is a locality in the Rural City of Horsham and the Shire of Yarriambiack, Victoria, Australia. At the 2021 census, Longerenong had a population of 237.

The agricultural college Longerenong College is located in Longerenong. The name is derived from a Jardwadjali word meaning "the dividing of the waters."

== History ==
In 1844, William Taylor and Dugald McPherson established a pastoral run near the division of the Wimmera River, where one branch forms the Yarriambiack Creek. By 1848, Taylor became the sole proprietor of his portion, naming it Longerenong. He sold the run in 1856 to brothers Charles and Samuel Wilson, the latter of whom built the Longerenong Homestead in 1862 and later funded Wilson Hall at the University of Melbourne. In the 1870s, parts of the run were opened for farming, and a short-lived school operated from 1877 to 1879. In 1889 when the Victorian Council of Agricultural Education established an agricultural college on 966 hectares of fertile loamy land. Longerenong Homestead was added to the Victorian Heritage Register in 1974.

== Geography ==
=== Climate ===
Longerenong experiences a cold semi-arid climate (Köppen: BSk) with warm, dry summers and quite cool, slightly wetter winters. On average, the town has 75.8 clear days and 114.4 cloudy days per annum. The wettest recorded day was 7 February 1957 with 106.7 mm (4.20 in) of rainfall. Extreme temperatures ranged from 48.1 °C (118.6 °F) on 26 January 2026 to −5.0 °C (23.0 °F) on 30 July 1997.

Climate data for Longerenong (36.67°S 142.30°E), 133 m (436 ft) AMSL (1891–2026, extremes to 1965, rainfall to 1860)
Month	Jan	Feb	Mar	Apr	May	Jun	Jul	Aug	Sep	Oct	Nov	Dec	Year
Record high °C (°F)	48.1 (118.6)	47.6 (117.7)	41.2 (106.2)	37.0 (98.6)	29.0 (84.2)	23.0 (73.4)	24.5 (76.1)	27.7 (81.9)	32.2 (90.0)	37.9 (100.2)	43.0 (109.4)	46.8 (116.2)	48.1 (118.6)
Mean daily maximum °C (°F)	30.2 (86.4)	30.0 (86.0)	26.4 (79.5)	21.6 (70.9)	17.2 (63.0)	13.9 (57.0)	13.2 (55.8)	14.9 (58.8)	17.4 (63.3)	21.0 (69.8)	24.8 (76.6)	27.9 (82.2)	21.5 (70.8)
Mean daily minimum °C (°F)	13.0 (55.4)	13.2 (55.8)	10.9 (51.6)	8.1 (46.6)	5.9 (42.6)	4.1 (39.4)	3.4 (38.1)	4.0 (39.2)	5.0 (41.0)	6.6 (43.9)	9.0 (48.2)	11.2 (52.2)	7.9 (46.2)
Record low °C (°F)	1.2 (34.2)	3.0 (37.4)	0.9 (33.6)	−2.5 (27.5)	−4.4 (24.1)	−4.8 (23.4)	−5.0 (23.0)	−3.7 (25.3)	−3.8 (25.2)	−3.1 (26.4)	−2.2 (28.0)	0.5 (32.9)	−5.0 (23.0)
Average precipitation mm (inches)	24.7 (0.97)	23.0 (0.91)	22.1 (0.87)	29.0 (1.14)	41.9 (1.65)	44.2 (1.74)	42.5 (1.67)	43.9 (1.73)	40.1 (1.58)	41.3 (1.63)	31.2 (1.23)	27.5 (1.08)	411.7 (16.21)
Average precipitation days (≥ 0.2 mm)	3.8	3.5	4.7	6.4	9.7	12.0	13.5	13.4	11.1	9.3	6.6	5.3	99.3
Average afternoon relative humidity (%)	31	32	38	46	60	69	67	61	57	47	39	34	48
Average dew point °C (°F)	7.7 (45.9)	8.0 (46.4)	7.4 (45.3)	7.1 (44.8)	7.6 (45.7)	6.9 (44.4)	5.9 (42.6)	5.7 (42.3)	6.7 (44.1)	6.1 (43.0)	6.4 (43.5)	6.5 (43.7)	6.8 (44.3)
Source 1: Bureau of Meteorology (1860–2025)
Source 2: Australian Broadcasting Corporation
