= George Bell (Australian footballer) =

Australian rules footballer, born 1912

Personal information
- Full name: Alfred George Bell
- Born: 7 May 1912; Horsham, Victoria
- Died: 12 May 1999 (aged 87)
- Original team: Horsham
- Height: 174 cm (5 ft 9 in)
- Weight: 79 kg (174 lb)

Playing career^{1}
Years	Club	Games (Goals)
1933–1942	Essendon	120 (4)
- ^{1} Playing statistics correct to the end of 1942.

Alfred George "Ginger" Bell (7 May 1912 – 12 May 1999) was an Australian rules footballer who played with Essendon in the Victorian Football League (VFL).

Originally from Horsham, Bell played at Essendon for 10 seasons. Bell was a defender, often used at full-back. He wasn't selected in Essendon's 1942 premiership team, playing just once that year, in what would be his final season.
