= Brent Hartigan =

Australian rules footballer

Personal information
- Born: 7 April 1985 (age 41)
- Original team: Tullamarine/Calder Under 18s
- Debut: Round 1, 26 March 2004, Richmond vs. Collingwood, at Melbourne Cricket Ground
- Height: 179 cm (5 ft 10 in)
- Weight: 79 kg (174 lb)

Playing career^{1}
Years	Club	Games (Goals)
2004–2007	Richmond	35 (3)
- ^{1} Playing statistics correct to the end of 2007.

Career highlights
- AFL Rising Star nominee 2004

Brent Hartigan (born 7 April 1985) is an Australian rules football player, formerly of the Richmond Football Club in the AFL. He is the son of Dean Hartigan who played for Essendon.

Hartigan was delisted after the 2007 AFL season, after playing 7 games in 2006 and one in 2007. He continued his career playing for Essendon's VFL side the Bendigo Bombers in the 2008 season.
