= Ben Hobbs =

Australian rules football player

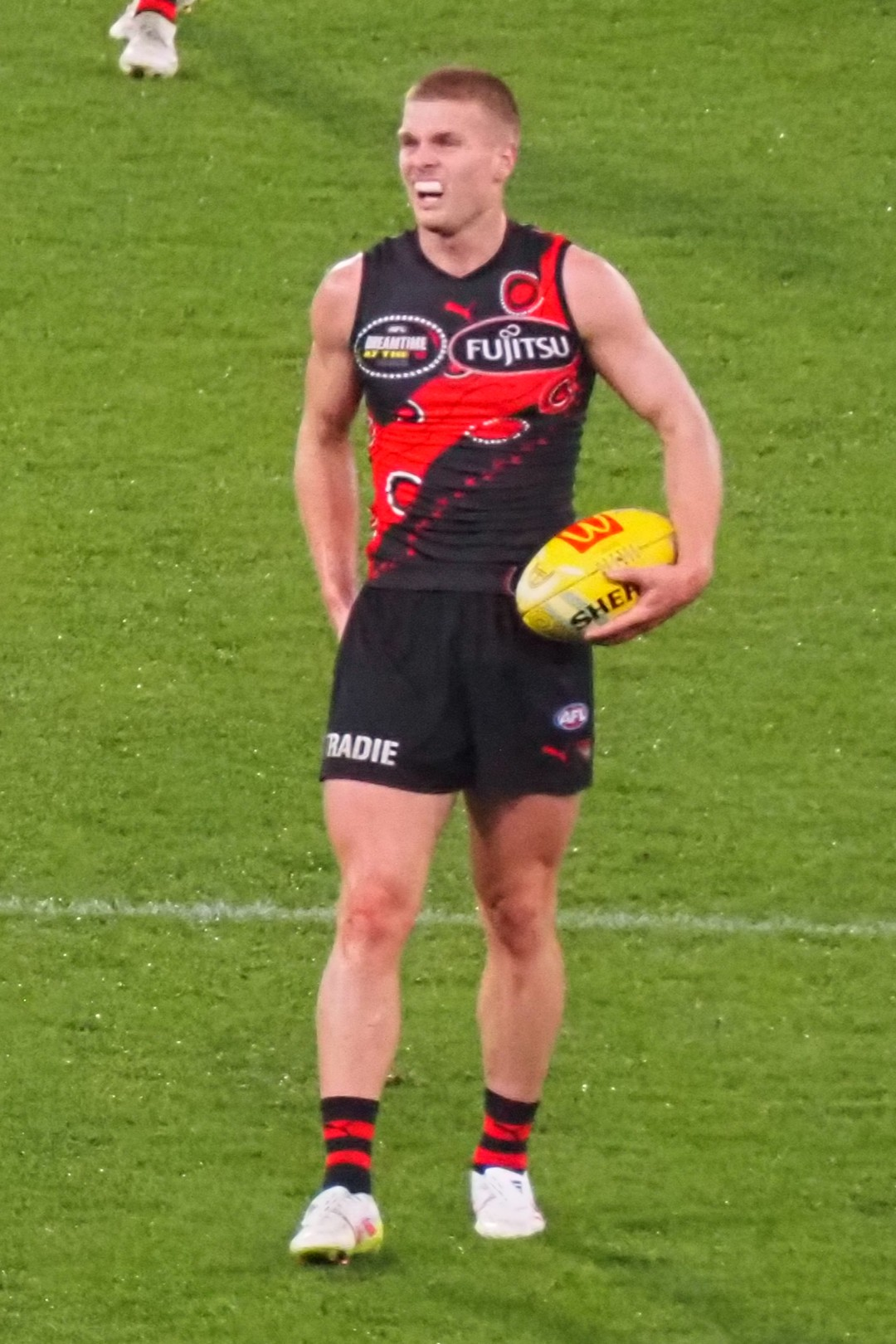
- Hobbs playing for Essendon in 2025

Personal information
- Full name: Benjamin Hobbs
- Nickname: Goblin
- Born: 16 September 2003 (age 23)
- Original team: Greater Western Victoria Rebels (NAB League)
- Draft: No. 13, 2021 national draft
- Debut: Round 5, 2022, Essendon vs. Fremantle, at Marvel Stadium
- Height: 183 cm (6 ft 0 in)
- Weight: 84 kg (185 lb)
- Position: Midfielder

Playing career
Years	Club	Games (Goals)
2022–2025	Essendon	65 (21)

Career highlights
- AFL Rising Star Nomination: 2022

Ben Hobbs (born 16 September 2003) is an Australian rules footballer who last played for the Essendon Football Club in the Australian Football League (AFL). He was drafted by Essendon as the 13th pick in the 2021 AFL draft

== Early life ==
Hobbs grew up in the Victorian country town of Horsham and played local football for Horsham Demons. He won a senior premiership in the Wimmera Football League at just 15 years old. He attended Ballarat Clarendon College as a boarder.

== AFL career ==
At the 2021 AFL draft, Essendon selected Hobbs with their first pick, no. 13 overall. Hobbs made his debut for the Bombers in round 5 of the 2022 AFL season, and was later nominated for the 2022 AFL Rising Star in round 14.

Hobbs was delisted after 65 games across 4 seasons at the Bombers.

== Statistics ==
Legend
G	Goals	K	Kicks	D	Disposals	T	Tackles
B	Behinds	H	Handballs	M	Marks

Season	Team	No.	Games	Totals							Averages (per game)							Votes
Season	Team	No.	Games	G	B	K	H	D	M	T	G	B	K	H	D	M	T	Votes
2022	Essendon	8	17	8	12	121	124	245	60	43	0.5	0.7	7.1	7.3	14.4	3.5	2.5	0
2023	Essendon	8	18	6	4	195	159	354	72	73	0.3	0.2	10.8	8.8	19.7	4.0	4.1	0
2024	Essendon	8	12	2	2	77	73	150	25	35	0.2	0.2	6.4	6.1	12.5	2.1	2.9	0
2025	Essendon	8	18	5	8	129	139	268	38	68	0.3	0.4	7.2	7.7	14.9	2.1	3.8	0
Career			65	21	26	522	495	1017	195	219	0.3	0.4	8.0	7.6	15.6	3.0	3.4	0
