= Kevin Dellar =

Australian rules footballer

Personal information
- Full name: Kevin W. J. Dellar
- Born: 28 May 1937 (age 89)
- Original teams: Haven, Horsham
- Height: 183 cm (6 ft 0 in)
- Weight: 79 kg (174 lb)
- Position: Half-back flank

Playing career^{1}
Years	Club	Games (Goals)
1959	Essendon	5 (0)
- ^{1} Playing statistics correct to the end of 1959.

Kevin Dellar (born 28 May 1937) is a former Australian rules footballer who played with Essendon in the Victorian Football League (VFL).

Before being recruited to Essendon in 1959, Dellar played for a number of country football clubs, including Haven (1954), Seymour (1955), Wangaratta Rovers (1956), North Gambier (1957) and Horsham (1958), which was due to his employment with the Gas and Fuel Corporation of Victoria.

Dellar played five consecutive senior VFL matches for Essendon in 1959 from round five onwards.

He returned to play with Horsham from 1960 to 1963, which included Horsham's 1960 and 1962 Wimmera Football League premierships.

Dellar was also captain-coach of Miga Lake in 1964 and 1965, which included their 1964 Central Wimmera Football League premiership.

Dellar then returned to play at Horsham from 1966 to 1972 (captain-coach of 1972 Wimmera Football League premiership) and then played for Noradjuha in the Central Wimmera Football League in 1973 and then back to Horsham as coach in 1974 and 1975. Dellar was later coach of St Michael's in 1977 in the Horsham & District Football League

His continued his involvement in football after he retired as a player and was a former president of the Horsham & District Football League and Life Member.

Dellar served on the Rural City of Horsham Council for 28 years, was a former Mayor of Horsham and was awarded an Order of Australia Medal (OAM) on Australia Day in 2007.
