= Peter Hickmott =

Australian rules footballer

Personal information
- Full name: Peter Hickmott
- Born: 21 February 1954
- Died: 22 August 2015 (aged 61)
- Original teams: Noradjuha (Horsham DFL), Horsham
- Height: 184 cm (6 ft 0 in)
- Weight: 70 kg (154 lb)

Playing career^{1}
Years	Club	Games (Goals)
1972–77	Essendon	58 (18)
1980	Footscray	11 (4)
Total		69 (22)
- ^{1} Playing statistics correct to the end of 1980.

Career highlights
- Essendon Reserves best & fairest: 1976; Horsham premiership captain-coach: 1989 & 1990; Essendon Under 19's coach: 1991

Peter Hickmott (21 February 1954 – 22 August 2015) was an Australian rules footballer who played with Essendon and Footscray in the Victorian Football League (VFL).
