= Des Bethke =

Australian rules footballer

Personal information
- Full name: Desmond Norman Bethke
- Born: 19 August 1943 (age 83); Netherby, Victoria
- Original team: Horsham
- Height: 183 cm (6 ft 0 in)
- Weight: 83 kg (183 lb)
- Position: Back Pocket

Playing career^{1}
Years	Club	Games (Goals)
1963–68	South Melbourne	56 (43)
- ^{1} Playing statistics correct to the end of 1968.

Desmond Norman Bethke OAM (born 19 August 1943) is a former Australian rules footballer who played with South Melbourne in the Victorian Football League (VFL).

== Family ==
The son of Eric Otto Bethke (1914-1985), and Phyllis Ada Bethke (1917-), née Love, Desmond Norman Bethke was born at Netherby (near Nhill) on 19 August 1943. He married Janet Ray Boucher (1943-).

== Football ==
Recruited from the Horsham Football Club, he was granted six match permits in 1963 and, after playing with the South Melbourne First XVIII for the first six matches of the 1963 season, he returned to Horsham.

He played all eighteen games for the South Melbourne First XVIII in the 1964 season, nine games in 1965, seven games in 1966, fourteen games in 1967, and two games in 1968.

Bethke's last senior game was against Carlton, on 18 May 1968, at the Lake Oval in round 6 of the 1968 season. It was a torrid match, eventually won by Carlton, 12.11 (83) to 10.11 (71) — which withstood a vigorous second half comeback from South Melbourne (South scoring 6.8 (44) to Carlton's 2.5 (17) — during which the controversial, and struggling-for-form Eric Sarich broke Bryan Quirk's jaw, with a kick to the head, in the first quarter (Quirk was out for seven weeks as a consequence of the injury).

== Town Clerk ==
From 1980 to 1990, Bethke was the Town Clerk of the City of Melbourne.

== Queen Elizabeth II Silver Jubilee Medal ==
He was one of 6,870 Australians awarded the Queen Elizabeth II Silver Jubilee Medal in 1977, and was awarded for his services to the South Melbourne City Council.

== Medal of the Order of Australia (OAM) ==
He was awarded a Medal of the Order of Australia, in the General Division (OAM) on 26 January 1996, "for service to local government and the community".
