= Meggyeskovácsi =

- Location of Meggyeskovácsi in Hungary
- Coordinates: 47°09′52″N 16°52′12″E
- Country: Hungary
- Region: Western Transdanubia
- County: Vas
- Subregion: Sárvári
- Rank: Village

Area
  - Total: 24.64 km^{2} (9.51 sq mi)

Population (1 January 2008)
  - Total: 755
  - Density: 30.6/km^{2} (79.4/sq mi)
- Time zone: UTC+1 (CET)
  - Summer (DST): UTC+2 (CEST)
- Postal code: 9757
- Area code: +36 95
- KSH code: 25760
- Website: www.meggyeskovacsi.hu

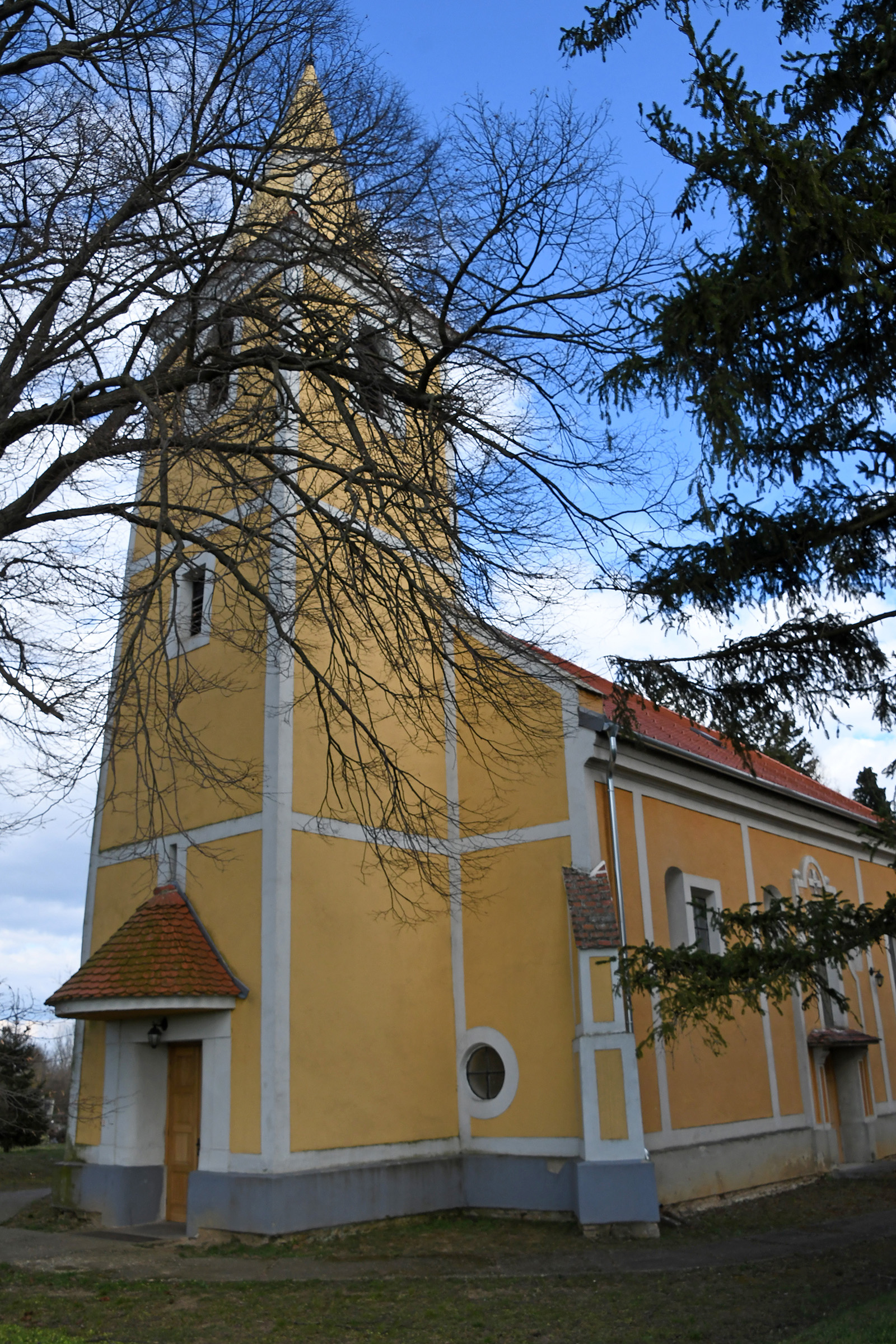

Meggyeskovácsi is a village in Vas county, Hungary.
