= Darryl Schwarz =

Australian rules footballer (born 1947)

Personal information
- Born: 26 June 1947 (age 79)
- Original team: Horsham
- Height: 189 cm (6 ft 2 in)
- Weight: 89 kg (196 lb)

Playing career^{1}
Years	Club	Games (Goals)
1968–69	Melbourne	12 (0)
- ^{1} Playing statistics correct to the end of 1969.

Darryl Schwarz (born 26 June 1947) is a former Australian rules footballer who played with Melbourne in the Victorian Football League (VFL).
