= Jack Turnbull (footballer) =

Australian rules footballer

Personal information
- Full name: John Charles McNicol Turnbull
- Born: 30 December 1885; Horsham, Victoria
- Died: 2 May 1917 (aged 31); Western Front, France
- Original team: Horsham

Playing career^{1}
Years	Club	Games (Goals)
1908	South Melbourne	12 (0)
- ^{1} Playing statistics correct to the end of 1908.

John Charles McNicol Turnbull (30 December 1885 – 2 May 1917) was an Australian rules footballer, who played with South Melbourne in the Victorian Football League.

== Family ==
The son of Charles William Turnbull (1862–1912), and Agnes Turnbull (1861–1915), née McNicol, John Charles McNicol Turnbull was born at Horsham, Victoria on 30 December 1885.

He married Mary Ellen Adams (1890–1974) in 1912.

== Football ==
He played 12 games for South Melbourne First XVIII in 1908; and, after this short VFL career, he returned to the bush and settled in Ballarat.

== Military service ==
Employed as a bricklayer, he enlisted in the First AIF, and left Australia for overseas service on HMAT Ascanius (A11) on 27 May 1916.

== Death ==
He was severely wounded in action on the Western Front on 30 April 1917, and died of his wounds on 2 May 1917.

Buried at the Trois Arbres Cemetery, at Steenwerck in Northern France, he left a widow and five children, one of whom was born after he left for overseas service.

== See also ==
- List of Victorian Football League players who died on active service
