= George Waterhouse (footballer) =

Australian rules footballer

Personal information
- Full name: George Waterhouse
- Born: 4 February 1899
- Died: 8 December 1931 (aged 32)
- Original team: Horsham
- Height: 182 cm (6 ft 0 in)
- Weight: 81 kg (179 lb)

Playing career^{1}
Years	Club	Games (Goals)
1922	Horsham	
1923–25	Geelong Association (VFA)	20 (2)
1925	South Melbourne	2 (1)
1925	Port Melbourne (VFA)	7 (0)
1926	Richmond	7 (2)
1927	Fitzroy	1 (0)
- ^{1} Playing statistics correct to the end of 1927.

George Waterhouse (4 February 1899 – 8 December 1931) was an Australian rules footballer who played with South Melbourne, Richmond and Fitzroy in the Victorian Football League (VFL) as well as Geelong Association and Port Melbourne in the Victorian Football Association (VFA)

Waterhouse initially played for Horsham in 1922 before moving to Ballarat Imperial in 1923. He was selected to represent the Ballarat League team that played Broken Hill in June and shortly afterwards secured a permit to move to Geelong Association in the VFA. Waterhouse played with Geelong Association until Round 1 of the 1925 season, after which he transferred to South Melbourne where he had been training. He only managed two games with South and within two months had moved again, this time to Port Melbourne, his third senior club in the one season.

In 1926 Waterhouse moved to Richmond where he added seven more VFL games to his career total. In 1927 he played one further VFL game, this time with Fitzroy.
