= Jim Shanahan =

Australian rules footballer

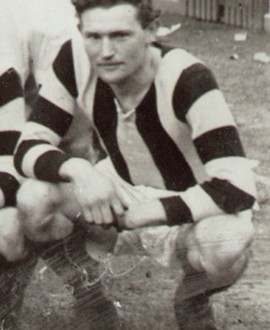
- Jobson during his Collingwood career

Personal information
- Full name: James Joseph Leo Shanahan
- Born: 1 June 1901; Guildford, Western Australia
- Died: 8 September 1985 (aged 84); Sunshine West, Victoria
- Original team: Horsham
- Height: 182 cm (6 ft 0 in)
- Weight: 79 kg (174 lb)

Playing career^{1}
Years	Club	Games (Goals)
1924–1926	Collingwood	42 (0)
1927	Carlton	2 (1)
1928–1929	Fitzroy	27 (3)
Total		71 (4)
- ^{1} Playing statistics correct to the end of 1929.

James Joseph Leo Shanahan (1 June 1901 – 8 September 1985) was an Australian rules footballer who played with Collingwood, Carlton and Fitzroy in the Victorian Football League (VFL).

Shanahan was born in Western Australia, but came to the VFL from Horsham. A defender, he played in a back pocket for Collingwood in the 1925 VFL Grand Final and was on a half back flank in the 1926 VFL Grand Final. He finished on the losing team in both matches.

He went to Carlton for the first part of the 1927 VFL season, playing in the seniors in rounds four and five.

Shanahan returned to Collingwood midway through 1927 and played in the VFL Seconds finals series. Shanahan also played for Collingwood against Western Australia at Subiaco in August, 1927, kicking two goals and best on ground honours!

In 1928 Shanahan played 17 games with Fitzroy.

Shanahan was appointed as captain / coach of the Camberwell Football Club in 1929 but resigned after five games, playing his last game against Yarraville on Saturday, 18 May 1929 and was cleared back to Fitzroy where he played out the 1929 season, playing his first match on Saturday, 22 June 1929 against Richmond.

Shanahan then crossed to Williamstown in 1930.

Shanahan, who worked as a police officer, was appointed coach of Williamstown the following year, in 1931 but was forced to resign before the beginning of the season by the Victorian Chief Commissioner, who ruled that members of the police force could not be football coaches.

He married Hannah Elizabeth James in 1931 in Carlton, Victoria. They had four children: Leo, Lawrence, Margaret and Johnny.

Shanahan coached the Henty Football Club in the Albury & District Football League in 1939, only to lose the grand final from a goal kicked after the final siren by a Brocklesby player.
