= Jim Norman (footballer) =

Australian rules footballer

Personal information
- Full name: James Charles Norman
- Born: 1 September 1928
- Died: 26 July 2017 (aged 88); Horsham, Victoria
- Original team: Horsham
- Height: 188 cm (6 ft 2 in)
- Weight: 83 kg (183 lb)

Playing career^{1}
Years	Club	Games (Goals)
1950–1952	Geelong	37 (15)
- ^{1} Playing statistics correct to the end of 1952.

James Charles Norman (1 September 1928 – 26 July 2017) was an Australian rules footballer who played with Geelong in the VFL during the early 1950s.

Recruited from Horsham, where he won their 1947 club best and fairest award.

Norman was a premiership player in his final two seasons of league football.

He was appointed coach of Golden Point in 1956.

He died in Horsham 26 July 2017.
