= Sid Smith (footballer, born 1928) =

Australian rules footballer (1928–1985)

Personal information
- Born: 12 September 1928
- Died: 12 May 1985 (aged 56)
- Original team: Horsham
- Height: 180 cm (5 ft 11 in)
- Weight: 78 kg (172 lb)

Playing career^{1}
Years	Club	Games (Goals)
1952–1953	Geelong	23 (0)
- ^{1} Playing statistics correct to the end of 1953.

Sid Smith (12 September 1928 – 12 May 1985) was an Australian rules footballer who played for Geelong in the Victorian Football League (VFL) in the early 1950s.

Nicknamed 'Boots', Smith arrived at Geelong from Horsham and played in a premiership as a reserve in his debut season. The following year he played in another Grand Final, on a half back flank, but this time finished on the losing team. Such was the strength of the Geelong side during his time at the club that out of the 23 games that he played he was involved in only two losses.

Sid was not related to the Sid Smith who played for Geelong in 1911.
