= Luke Brennan (Australian footballer) =

Australian rules footballer

Personal information
- Born: 3 March 1985 (age 41)
- Original team: Horsham / North Ballarat Rebels
- Debut: 2005, Hawthorn vs. Carlton, Round 6, at Telstra Dome
- Height: 185 cm (6 ft 1 in)
- Weight: 84 kg (185 lb)

Playing career^{1}
Years	Club	Games (Goals)
2003–2006	Hawthorn	19 (11)
2007–2008	Sydney	9 (1)
Total		28 (12)
- ^{1} Playing statistics correct to the end of 2008.

Luke Brennan (born 3 March 1985) is a former Australian rules footballer who played for Hawthorn and the Sydney Swans in the Australian Football League (AFL).

He was recruited to the Hawthorn Football Club with the 8th selection in the 2002 AFL draft. After just 19 games in four seasons, he struggled at the elite level. He played 10 games in a row during the middle part of the 2005 season. In that year he was also the runner-up in The AFL Footy Show's singing competition.

Brennan was delisted by Hawthorn at the end of the 2006 AFL season. He was later selected by Sydney in the 2007 AFL rookie draft.

He received a Mark of the Year nomination in Round 18, 2008 against the Western Bulldogs for a courageous mark over a pack of players. At the end of the season, however, he was again delisted. He was not selected by any AFL teams and later played for Old Scotch in the Victorian Amateur Football Association (VAFA).
