= Karl Leopold von Möller =

Austrian military officer, author, and politician (1876–1943)

Karl von Möller
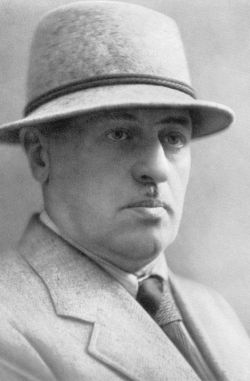

1st Gauleiter of the Banat
- In office 1932–1933

Deputy Leader the German Party
- In office 1919–1921

Member of the Senate of Romania
- In office November 1919 – June 1926
- Constituency: Banat Swabia

Personal details
- Born: Karl Leopold Edler von Möller; 11 October 1876 Vienna, Austria
- Died: 21 February 1943 (aged 66) Jimbolia, Romania
- Party: Nazi Party (1931–1943)
- Other political affiliations: Germany Party (until 1924); Independent (1924–1931)
- Spouses: Agathe von Veroczy (1917–1923); Margarete Jung (m.1927)
- Children: Edith von Möller; Karl-Heinz von Möller (1926–2014); Erich von Möller (b. 1932)
- Parent: Karl August von Möller
- Relatives: Queen Victoria (2nd Cousin),-Harteneck (Father b. 1836 – d. 1892), Countessa, Karoline von Möller-Harteneck (Mother – née Pickard b. 1847 – d. 1927)
- Education: Theresian Military Academy, Kriegsschule (Austria)
- Occupation: Army officer, author and politician
- Awards: Iron Cross; Knight's Cross of the Iron Cross; Order of Leopold

Military service
- Allegiance: Austria-Hungary
- Years of service: 1893–1927
- Rank: Oberst
- Commands: 65th Infantry Regiment of Hungary, 34th Infantry Division,
- Battles/wars: Serbian campaign of World War I, Battle of Galicia

Karl Leopold von Möller (11 October 1876 – 21 February 1943) was an Austrian military officer, author and German nationalist politician in the Kingdom of Romania. He was born into a military family of the Austro-Hungarian nobility and became a senior general staff officer in the Austro-Hungarian Army, rising to the rank of Oberst (colonel) and regimental commandant. From 1932 to 1933, Möller was the 1st Gauleiter of the Banat. He was an enthusiastic supporter of Adolf Hitler and the Nazi Party and, in 1932, founded the antisemitic newspaper "Der Stürmer" in Timișoara, an imitation of the German Nazi publication.

== Life and early work ==
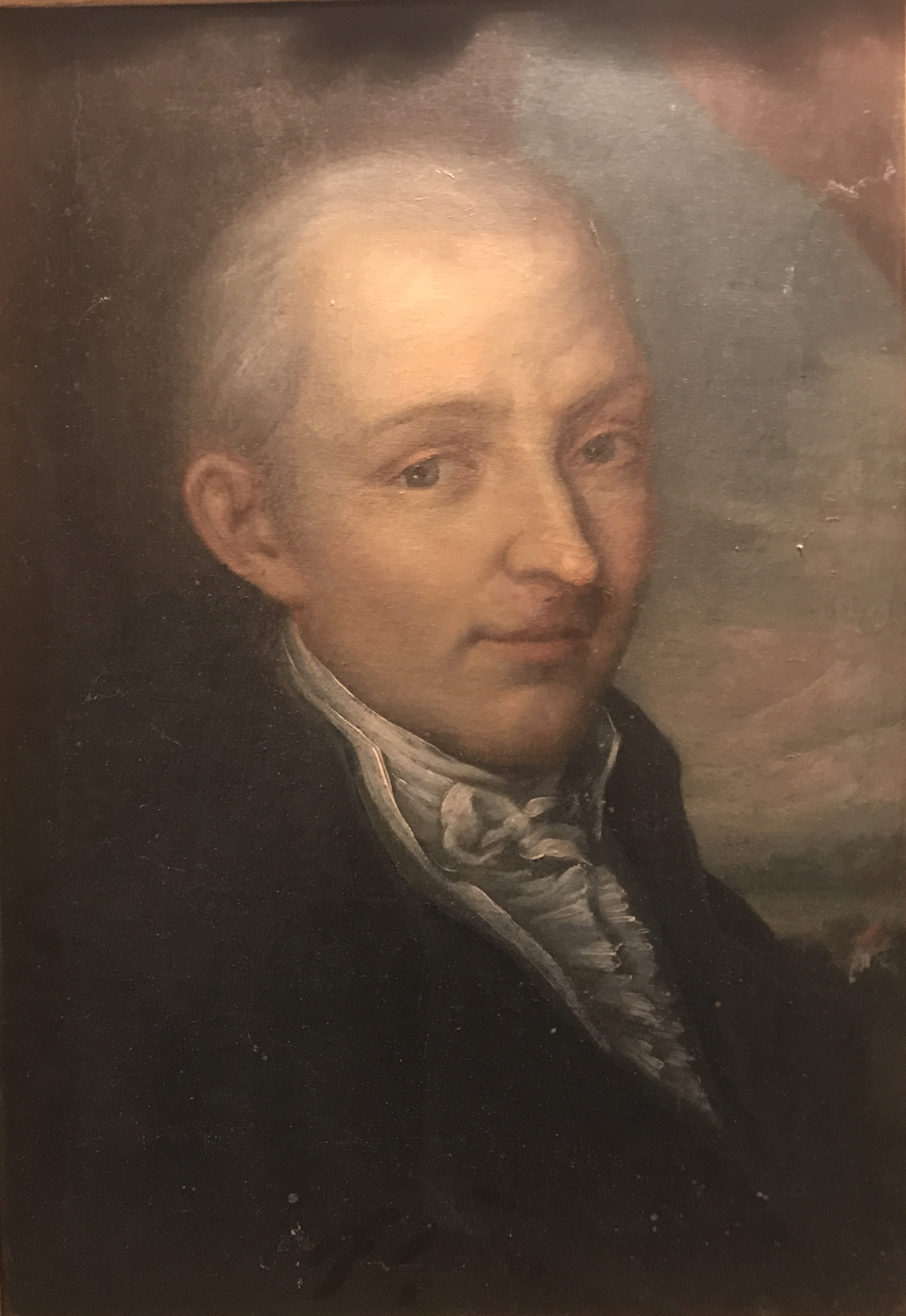
Karl Gustaf von Möller (1775) who was allegedly an early developer of the camera

The von Möller family is believed to be from the Lüneburg Heath. Karl von Möller's grandfather volunteered in the Wars of Liberation and was disarmed in Sibiu (Transylvania). Von Möller's grandfather is believed by some to have been an early developer of the camera who is generally not given credit because he didn't submit a patent application on a timely basis. His father came to Vienna from Sibiu.

Karl von Möller was born in Vienna, where he attended the cadet school and the war school after high school. During the First World War, he served as a major and chief of staff of the 34th Infantry Division, Banater Division, on first the Serbian and then the Galician fronts. Starting in 1916, he served as a lieutenant colonel and later as colonel in Hungarian Infantry Regiment No. 65 on the Eastern Front. He was awarded the Order of Leopold.

It is believed that his wife and children fled Romania at the end of the war and kept a private life somewhere overseas.

== Politician ==
After the collapse of the Habsburg monarchy in 1918, he left the army as a colonel and went to Timișoara, where he campaigned for the political and cultural equality of Romanian Germans in the field of national politics. On 9 May 1919 Karl von Möller co-founded the German-Swabian Cultural Association. It was led by chairman Johann Junker and executive chairman Michael Kausch. In 1919, Möller was elected the second mayor of Timișoara. From 1919 to 1926, he was a senator in the Romanian upper house in Bucharest, representing Banat Swabia. Karl von Möller joined the "Volksgemeinschaft" together with Josef Gabriel in 1920.

In 1920, he began making trips to Germany and gave lectures in Saxony, Westphalia, Baden, Württemberg, Thuringia, Berlin and Munich. Since he had contact with National Socialists in 1923, he is considered an early supporter of Adolf Hitler. After his return, he became chief editor of the "Banat German newspaper". He was a member of the "German People's Council".

Karl von Möller is considered one of the pioneers of fascism in the Banat. In 1931, he founded the first Banat local group of the "National Socialist Self-Help Movement of the Germans in Romania" (NSDR) in Jimbolia (German: Hatzfeld), Romania. Shortly afterwards, Möller became the first Gauleiter of the Banat in 1932. In the same year, he founded the National Socialist newspaper "Der Stürmer" in Timișoara. In the spring of 1933, he resigned as Gauleiter. In the same year, Möller managed the Sibiu "Office for ideological education and cultural policy". After his application for admission to the Wehrmacht was rejected because he had exceeded the entry age limit, he wrote to Karl Schworm on 7 September 1939: "What would I be happy if fate put me at the front, regardless of whether in west or east! I can't think of a better way to end my fighting life than to end up for the leader and the empire". In 1941, he was appointed the "cultural council "of the German ethnic group in Romania.

== Author ==
According to "Kulturportal West-Ost", in addition to his politics "von Möller" developed a lively writing activity, which was based on the great novels of Adam Müller-Guttenbrunn (1852–1923) and the intellectual and political development of Southeastern Germany, but especially the Banat Swabia, from the settlement until their ethnic awakening at the turn of the 20th century. As editor-in-chief of the 'Banater Deutsche Zeitung', he served the 'Banater Schwäbische Volksgemeinschaft'.”

Von Möller's novels portray events from the perspective of their time. He was one of the most popular authors of historical novels of his time, but with a nationalist and anti-Semitic touch.

Von Möller's ultranationalist writings began in the early 1920s. As "advocate of folk anti-Semitism" he wrote in his Gazette "The Striker". In his two-volume work How the Swabian communities came into being (Timișoara 1923–24), Möller in 1924 "openly expressed his chauvinistic ideas and ideas by incorporating the 'Germanic racial element' (Vol. 2, p. 22) of the German superman into the foreground of his historical statements.

In the 1936 novel Die Werschetzer Tat ("The Weshetzer Act") he glorified the defence of Werschetz on the westernmost slope of the Banat Mountains at the time of the last great invasion of the Banat in 1788 by the Turks. Based on historical events, the author portrays the rural life of German settlers of the first generation in the midst of a colourful mix of people and people. He adopted Nazi ideologies back such as the glorification of struggle, peasantry and the leader's personality, the superiority of the " Aryan race", and the inferiority, moral and physical degradation of the "foreign people": The Germans "must be protected from the teeth of the strange army wolf, who runs up and down the Danube with hanging blood tongues."

In the novel "Borders Wander: A Banat Roman" (1937) von Möller describes his life and customs of the Banat Swabians from the turn of the century to the First World War and the resulting tripartite division of the Banat in 1920, using the example of the predominantly German-inhabited Jimbolia. The place fell to Yugoslavia after 1918 and to Romania in 1924 in exchange for Jaša Tomić. As in "The Werschetzer Act" must also in this novel the "Aryan" hero "against their racial opponent" claim.

In the novel "Die Salpeterer: A Freedom Struggle by German Peasants" (1938) Möller describes the struggle for freedom of the Hotzenwald Salpeterer in the Black Forest against the Prince-Bishop of St. Blasien and their eventual banishment to the Banat. He describes their homesickness and defiance against the injustice suffered from their point of view and only allows them to become "real Banat farmers" after generations.

von Möller was very active as a writer in his last years. Above all, he published in the Eher-Verlag of the NSDAP.

On 11 October 1941, the author's 65th birthday, Reich Minister Joseph Goebbels expressed his thanks to Karl to the nation.

== Military career ==
After graduating from the Military Academy in Vienna, he was appointed as a senior state officer, and served in several garrisons. In 1913, he was transferred to Timișoara where he served in the 34th Infantry Division during the 1914 campaigns in Serbia and Galicia. He was then transferred to the headquarters in Vienna. In 1916, he was promoted from lieutenant colonel to Commander of the 65th Infantry Regiment of Hungary. Under his command, the 65th Infantry Regiment of Hungary fought on the eastern front, and Möller was subsequently promoted to colonel. At the end of the war, the regiment suppressed the uprising of the Republicans in Upper Hungary (now Slovakia) after which the unit was put in reserve by the Károlyi government.

== Political career in Romania ==
After World War I, Möller remained in Timișoara, where he joined the German Popular Movement of Banat (Bewegung des Banater Deutschtums), bolstering its struggle for self-affirmation. He forayed into the cultural field as a journalist, and later became active in politics. He held the position of editor-in-chief at Schwäbische Volkspresse for several years, strengthening the voice of the Swabian-German community. In September 1923 Karl von Möller actively participated in a celebration of the 200th anniversary of the migration of the Swabians, organized by the Banat German Movement.

In autumn 1919 he was briefly Deputy Mayor of Timișoara, after which he was elected four times to the Romanian Parliament, in which he served between 1919 and 1927 as a representative of the Swabians in Banat. In the parliamentary debate on the 1923 Constitution of Romania on 12 March 1923, he said he was speaking on behalf of the "Banat Swabian People", declaring the Germans' loyalty to their new homeland, but demanded that the new constitution should not jeopardize the existence of minorities from a national point of view; he said the new constitution did not include the promises made to the minorities by the Romanians in Alba Iulia.

In May 1920 the "moderate" Swabians, led by Kaspar Muth formed the Swabian Party of Autonomy, joined by Karl von Möller, Dr. Joseph Gabriel and Peter Schiff of the National Swabian-German party.

In 1927, Möller withdrew from public life and settled in Jimbolia, where he married Margaret Jung, the daughter of a wealthy farmer from the Banat. Together they had two children, Karlheinz and Erich

== Involvement in Nazism ==
At the beginning of 1931, he returned to public life, becoming the chief editor of the German-language Jimbolia newspaper, "Hatzfelder Zeitung", and president of the local ethnic community. Möller, who adhered to Nazi ideology, tried to use these positions to popularise Nazism and prepare the Banat population for its adoption. This attempt was thwarted, and he lost both positions by the end of 1931.

After 1930, and especially after 1933, the Nazi movement had achieved a strong position in Romania, capturing the leadership of the Germans in Romania. The initiator of the Nazi movement among the German minority was the reserve captain Fritz Fabritius. From 1931, Fabritius tried to expand the movement in Banat, finding audiences in some circles of dissatisfied and young Swabians who returned from studies in Germany. At the end of 1931, Karl von Möller constituted a movement group at Jimbolia and was proclaimed the first Gauleiter of the Banat. From 1 July 1932, he published the antisemitic newspaper "Der Stürmer" in Timișoara. It was an imitation of the publication Der Stürmer published in Germany by the German Nazi Julius Streicher who, after World War II, was sentenced to death in the first of the Nuremberg trials, found guilty of crimes against humanity and executed by hanging in 1946.

Möller also led the Cultural Office of the Germans in Romania (Kulturamt der Deutschen in Rumänien), established by Rudolf Brandsch to protect the cultural assets of the Germans in Romania.

In 1934 he took the lead of the Provincial Cultural Office of the Renewal Movement (Landeskulturamt der Erneuerungsbewegung) in Sibiu, where he stayed for five years, and lived until his death on 21 February 1943.

== Death ==
Möller died at his home in Jimbolia, Romania from a stroke in 1943 at the age of 66.

== Books ==
- Wie die schwäbischen Gemeinden entstanden sind, Timișoara, 1923
- Die Werschetzer Tat, Der Große Brockhaus, Leipzig, 1935.
- Die Werschertzer / Ein Roman von Bauern und Reitern, Verlag Franz Eher, Nachf. Berlin, 1938
- Reiter im Grenzland, Erzählung, 1939
- Der Aufklärer – Novelle, Wien/Leipzig, Wiener Verlag, 1939
- Grenzen wandern. Ein Banater Roman, Leipzig, Amalthea-Verlag, 1940.
- Im Schatten der Exzellenz, Novellen, 1940
- Deutsches Schicksal im Banat, 1940
- Das steinerne Schachbrett (Roman), Braunschweig, Berlin, Hamburg. Georg Westermann, 1941
- Frontbriefe deutscher Arbeitskameraden 1939 – 1940, Die Lothringerin NSDAP Verlag EA 1942
- Die Salpeterer, ein Freiheitskampf deutscher Bauern, 1942
- Der Savoyer (Ein Prinz Eugen Roman), München Verlag Franz Eber Nachf. Gmbh, 1943.
- Spätsommer; Eine Geschichte aus Wien, Franz Eber, 1943
- Das Korsett der Marquise, 1944
- Die Lothringerin, Roman eines Frauenlebens zwischen zwei Nationen und zwei Zeitaltern, 1944

== Awards ==
- Kurt Faber Prize, 1938
- Westmark Prize, 1938
- First Prize of the German Book Guild in Romania, 1935
- Austrian Imperial Order of Leopold, 1916
- Iron Cross, 1939
- Knight's Cross of the Iron Cross.

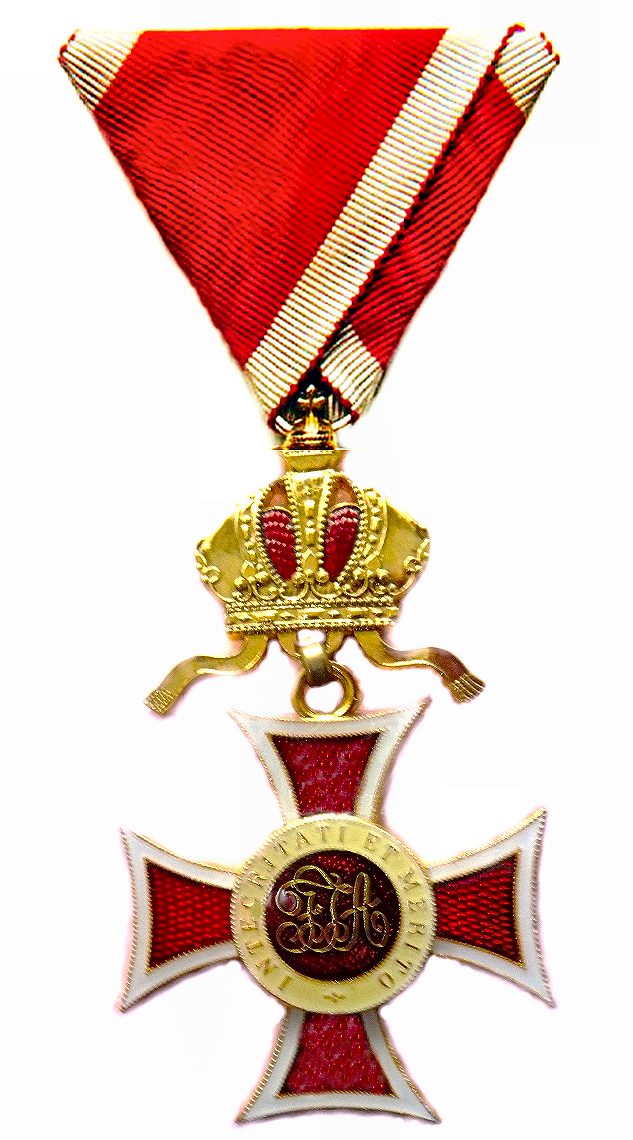
Austrian Imperial Order of Leopold

== Legacy ==
Karl-Möller-Straße in Königsbach-Stein, Germany is named after him.

=== Ancestry ===
Ancestors of Karl Leopold von Möller

16. Karl von Möller
8. Baron, Karl von Möller
17. Unknown
4. Baron, Karl Gustav von Möller
18. Maximillian von Klebelsberg
9. Baroness von Klebelsberg
19. Maria Ludmilla Elenora Sparr
2. Count, Karl August von Möller
10. Unknown
5. Baroness, Karoline Regine von Burg
11. Anna Esterle
1. Count, Karl Leopold von Möller
12. Unknown
6. Franz, Duke of Picardy
13. Unknown
3. Countessa, Karoline Pickard
14. Unknown
7. Unknown Duchess of Picardy
15. Unknown

== See also ==
- Banat (1941–1944)
