= Howard Staehr =

Australian rules footballer

Personal information
- Full name: Howard R. Staehr
- Born: 30 March 1955 (age 71)
- Original team: Horsham
- Height: 185 cm (6 ft 1 in)
- Weight: 80 kg (176 lb)
- Position: Follower

Playing career^{1}
Years	Club	Games (Goals)
1974–1976	Essendon	5 (0)
- ^{1} Playing statistics correct to the end of 1976.

Howard Staehr (born 30 March 1955) is a former Australian rules footballer who played with Essendon in the Victorian Football League (VFL). Recruited from Horsham, he played with Essendon's under-19s in 1973 before moving on to the senior list in 1974. He played five senior games over three seasons, though he missed 1975 entirely due to a broken leg. Staehr later played two seasons with Brunswick in the Victorian Football Association and also spent a year playing for Hawthorn's reserves.

Staehr is also a former professional runner.
