= Brad Sholl =

Australian rules footballer

Personal information
- Born: 10 November 1972 (age 53)
- Original team: Horsham
- Draft: No. 32, 1988 national draft
- Height: 184 cm (6 ft 0 in)
- Weight: 84 kg (185 lb)

Playing career^{1}
Years	Club	Games (Goals)
1993–1994	North Melbourne	2 (0)
1995–2002	Geelong	169 (46)
Total		171 (46)
- ^{1} Playing statistics correct to the end of 2002.

Brad Sholl (born 10 November 1972) is a former Australian rules footballer who played with Geelong in the Australian Football League.

A defender, Sholl started his career with North Melbourne but after two seasons on their list he only managed to play twice. Before the 1995 season he was traded to Geelong for Robert Scott and played in a grand final in his first year at his new club. He finished runner up in Geelong's 1996 best and fairest award and 7th in the 1997 Brownlow Medal.

Sholl played three years with Port Fairy before moving to Hawkesdale Macarthur for a year, where he missed out on the league best and fairest by one vote to teammate Murray Harbel. Moving South-West he was the captain coach at the Timboon Demons.
