= Bryan Pirouet =

Australian rules footballer

Personal information
- Full name: Bryan K. Pirouet
- Born: 12 July 1949 (age 77)
- Original teams: Homers, Horsham
- Height: 184 cm (6 ft 0 in)
- Weight: 85 kg (187 lb)
- Position: Half-back flank

Playing career^{1}
| Years | Club | Games (Goals) |
| 1969–71 | Essendon | 14 (0) |
| 1972-74 | Prahran | 13 (7) |
- ^{1} Playing statistics correct to the end of 1971.

Career highlights
- VFA Premiership: 1973

Bryan Pirouet (born 12 July 1949) is a former Australian rules footballer who played with Essendon in the Victorian Football League (VFL).

After leaving Essendon, he played with Prahran in the Victorian Football Association (VFA), winning a premiership with them in 1973.

Pirouet played for several country sides after his time in the VFA, captain-coaching Horsham Imperials, playing for Wonthaggi and captain-coaching Dalyston.
