= George Curran (Australian footballer) =

Australian rules footballer

Personal information
- Full name: Patrick Michael Gilbert Curran
- Born: 17 March 1883; Wail, Victoria (near Horsham)
- Died: 3 February 1957 (aged 73); Gilgandra, New South Wales
- Original team: Horsham

Playing career^{1}
Years	Club	Games (Goals)
1906–07	South Melbourne	5 (1)
- ^{1} Playing statistics correct to the end of 1907.

Patrick Michael Gilbert "George" Curran (17 March 1883 – 3 February 1957, also known as Gil Curran) was an Australian rules footballer who played with South Melbourne in the Victorian Football League (VFL).
