= Bob Norman (footballer) =

Australian rules footballer

Personal information
- Full name: Robert Norman
- Born: 4 January 1937 (age 89)
- Original team: Horsham
- Height: 191 cm (6 ft 3 in)
- Weight: 86 kg (190 lb)

Playing career^{1}
Years	Club	Games (Goals)
1957	Collingwood	9 (9)
1961	Geelong	11 (10)
1963-65	Sorrento	49 (0)
Total		20 (19)
- ^{1} Playing statistics correct to the end of 1961.

Robert Norman is a former Australian rules footballer who played with Collingwood and Geelong in the Victorian Football League (VFL).

Norman was appointed Sorrento's coach for 3 seasons after former Essendon and North Melbourne's Peter O'Sullivan filled the role in 1962. Sorrento defeated Edithvale Aspendale in the 1964 grand final at Mornington by 16 points 13-17-95 to 10-19-79.
