= Alex Lee (Australian footballer) =

Australian rules footballer, born 1908

Personal information
- Full name: Alex Lee
- Born: 24 March 1908
- Died: 10 August 1996 (aged 88)
- Original team: Horsham
- Height: 178 cm (5 ft 10 in)
- Weight: 76 kg (168 lb)

Playing career^{1}
| Years | Club | Games (Goals) |
| 1933–1935 | Hawthorn | 31 (1) |
- ^{1} Playing statistics correct to the end of 1935.

Alex Lee (24 March 1908 – 10 August 1996) was an Australian rules footballer who played for the Hawthorn Football Club in the Victorian Football League (VFL).

Lee's great-grandson, Josh Ward, was drafted to Hawthorn in the 2021 AFL draft.
