= Geoff Gourlay =

Australian international rugby union player

- Full name: Geoffrey Allen Gourlay
- Born: 7 July 1922 Brisbane, Australia
- Died: 24 May 2008 (aged 85)
- Height: 6 ft 4 in (193 cm)
- Weight: 14.1 st (197 lb; 90 kg)

Rugby union career
- Position: Lock
International career
Years	Team	Apps	(Points)
1946	Australia		

Geoffrey Allen Gourlay (7 July 1922 – 24 May 2008) was an Australian international rugby union player.

Gourlay was born in Brisbane and educated at St Joseph's College, Gregory Terrace.

A member of the Royal Australian Navy, Gourlay was stationed in Melbourne and represented Victoria in interstate rugby. He played as a lock and occasional back rower. In 1946, Gourlay gained Wallabies selection for a tour of New Zealand, where he debuted off the bench against North Auckland. He didn't get to feature in any of the internationals and had his tour end early after picking up a spinal injury.

Gourlay switched to Australian rules football in 1947 and played for Horsham.

== See also ==
- List of Australia national rugby union players
