= Bernie O'Brien =

Australian rules footballer, born 1909

Personal information
- Full name: Bernard Richard A. O'Brien
- Born: 14 May 1909; Footscray, Victoria
- Died: 9 January 1955 (aged 45); Footscray, Victoria
- Original team: Railways
- Height: 169 cm (5 ft 7 in)
- Weight: 75 kg (165 lb)
- Position: Rover

Playing career^{1}
Years	Club	Games (Goals)
1929–1930	Footscray	18 (17)
1931	Carlton	12 (7)
1933–1938	Footscray	70 (112)
Total		100 (136)
- ^{1} Playing statistics correct to the end of 1938.

Bernard Richard O'Brien (14 May 1909 – 9 January 1955) was an Australian rules footballer who played with Footscray and Carlton in the Victorian Football League (VFL).

== Family ==
His brother, Walter Joseph O'Brien (1907-1983), also played for Footscray.

== Football ==
A Railways recruit, O'Brien played 18 games for Footscray in 1929 and 1930, his first stint at the club.

In 1931 he played for Carlton.

In 1932 he was captain-coach of Yinnar.

He returned to Footscray in 1933 and brought up his 100th league game in his only league appearance in 1938.

O'Brien, who represented Victoria twice in 1937, left Footscray in 1939 to coach Horsham.

== Death ==
He died at his residence in Footscray, Victoria on 9 January 1955.
