= Robert Amos =

Australian rules footballer

Personal information
- Full name: Robert Amos
- Born: 11 July 1955 (age 71)
- Original team: Horsham
- Height: 180 cm (5 ft 11 in)
- Weight: 73 kg (161 lb)
- Position: Utility

Playing career^{1}
Years	Club	Games (Goals)
1973–76, 1978–79	Essendon	54 (15)
- ^{1} Playing statistics correct to the end of 1979.

Robert Amos (born 11 July 1955) is a former Australian rules footballer who played with Essendon in the Victorian Football League (VFL).
