= Ray Harrip =

Australian rules footballer

Personal information
- Full name: Ray Harrip
- Born: 21 October 1935
- Died: 2 April 2011 (aged 75)
- Original team: Horsham
- Height: 180 cm (5 ft 11 in)
- Weight: 80 kg (176 lb)

Playing career^{1}
Years	Club	Games (Goals)
1957	Geelong	4 (0)
- ^{1} Playing statistics correct to the end of 1957.

Ray Harrip (21 October 1935 – 2 April 2011) was an Australian rules footballer who played with Geelong in the Victorian Football League (VFL).
