= Alex Doyle (Australian footballer) =

Australian rules footballer, born 1904

Personal information
- Full name: Alex Doyle
- Born: 29 July 1904
- Died: 21 January 1973 (aged 68)
- Original team: Horsham
- Height: 189 cm (6 ft 2 in)
- Weight: 85 kg (187 lb)

Playing career^{1}
Years	Club	Games (Goals)
1929–1931	Carlton	53 (32)
- ^{1} Playing statistics correct to the end of 1931.

Alex Doyle (29 July 1904 – 21 January 1973) was an Australian rules footballer who played for the Carlton Football Club in the Victorian Football League (VFL).
