= Jack Hartigan =

Australian rules footballer

Personal information
- Full name: Jack Hartigan
- Born: 12 July 1928
- Died: 25 October 1986 (aged 58)
- Original team: Horsham
- Height: 173 cm (5 ft 8 in)
- Weight: 73 kg (161 lb)

Playing career^{1}
Years	Club	Games (Goals)
1951–52	Hawthorn	15 (8)
1952–53	St Kilda	7 (6)
Total		22 (14)
- ^{1} Playing statistics correct to the end of 1953.

Jack Hartigan (12 July 1928 – 25 October 1986) was an Australian rules footballer who played with Hawthorn and St Kilda in the Victorian Football League (VFL).
