= Keith McDonald =

Keith McDonald may refer to:

- Keith McDonald (baseball) (born 1973), former St. Louis Cardinals baseball player
- Keith McDonald (footballer) (1929–1990), Australian rules footballer
- Keith McDonald (American football) (born 1963), former National Football League wide receiver

== See also ==
- Keith MacDonald (1927–2021), Canadian politician
- Keith Macdonald (1933–2021), Scottish rugby union player
