= 1951 VFL season =

55th season of the Victorian Football League (VFL)

1951 VFL premiership season
- Teams: 12
- Premiers: Geelong; 4th premiership
- Minor premiers: Geelong; 6th minor premiership
- Brownlow Medallist: Bernie Smith (Geelong)
- Leading goalkicker medallist: John Coleman (Essendon)
- Matches played: 112
- Highest: 85,795

The 1951 VFL season was the 55th season of the Victorian Football League (VFL), the highest level senior Australian rules football competition in Victoria. The season featured twelve clubs, ran from 21 April until 29 September, and comprised an 18-game home-and-away season followed by a finals series featuring the top four clubs.

The premiership was won by the Geelong Football Club for the fourth time, after it defeated Essendon by eleven points in the 1951 VFL Grand Final.

== Background ==
In 1951, the VFL competition consisted of twelve teams of 18 on-the-field players each, plus two substitute players, known as the 19th man and the 20th man. A player could be substituted for any reason; however, once substituted, a player could not return to the field of play under any circumstances.

Teams played each other in a home-and-away season of 18 rounds; matches 12 to 18 were the "home-and-way reverse" of matches 1 to 7.

Once the 18 round home-and-away season had finished, the 1951 VFL Premiers were determined by the specific format and conventions of the Page–McIntyre system.

== Home-and-away season ==
=== Round 1 ===
Home team	Home team score	Away team	Away team score	Venue	Crowd	Date
Geelong	13.17 (95)	South Melbourne	6.5 (41)	Kardinia Park	22,000	21 April 1951
Essendon	13.8 (86)	Melbourne	10.16 (76)	Windy Hill	24,000	21 April 1951
Collingwood	20.21 (141)	North Melbourne	7.6 (48)	Victoria Park	23,000	21 April 1951
Carlton	13.9 (87)	Hawthorn	7.15 (57)	Princes Park	13,000	21 April 1951
Richmond	15.9 (99)	Footscray	15.10 (100)	Punt Road Oval	22,000	21 April 1951
St Kilda	10.18 (78)	Fitzroy	16.12 (108)	Junction Oval	27,000	21 April 1951

=== Round 2 ===
Home team	Home team score	Away team	Away team score	Venue	Crowd	Date
North Melbourne	8.14 (62)	St Kilda	12.9 (81)	Arden Street Oval	13,000	28 April 1951
Fitzroy	12.11 (83)	Geelong	10.7 (67)	Brunswick Street Oval	18,000	28 April 1951
South Melbourne	5.7 (37)	Richmond	14.13 (97)	Lake Oval	18,000	28 April 1951
Hawthorn	9.7 (61)	Essendon	12.14 (86)	Glenferrie Oval	12,000	28 April 1951
Melbourne	7.15 (57)	Collingwood	15.16 (106)	MCG	37,000	28 April 1951
Footscray	5.11 (41)	Carlton	4.16 (40)	Western Oval	26,000	28 April 1951

=== Round 3 ===
Home team	Home team score	Away team	Away team score	Venue	Crowd	Date
Hawthorn	12.15 (87)	St Kilda	9.10 (64)	Glenferrie Oval	10,000	5 May 1951
Footscray	10.9 (69)	North Melbourne	5.13 (43)	Western Oval	20,000	5 May 1951
Collingwood	14.18 (102)	Geelong	7.8 (50)	Victoria Park	24,500	5 May 1951
Carlton	12.12 (84)	Richmond	16.12 (108)	Princes Park	28,000	5 May 1951
Melbourne	8.12 (60)	Fitzroy	12.12 (84)	MCG	21,500	5 May 1951
South Melbourne	14.20 (104)	Essendon	14.7 (91)	Lake Oval	14,000	5 May 1951

=== Round 4 ===
Home team	Home team score	Away team	Away team score	Venue	Crowd	Date
North Melbourne	12.6 (78)	South Melbourne	9.19 (73)	Arden Street Oval	15,000	12 May 1951
Fitzroy	10.10 (70)	Footscray	6.16 (52)	Brunswick Street Oval	20,500	12 May 1951
St Kilda	15.8 (98)	Melbourne	14.7 (91)	Junction Oval	15,000	12 May 1951
Richmond	17.18 (120)	Hawthorn	7.14 (56)	Punt Road Oval	15,000	12 May 1951
Essendon	12.11 (83)	Collingwood	5.14 (44)	Windy Hill	35,000	12 May 1951
Geelong	14.7 (91)	Carlton	9.13 (67)	Kardinia Park	20,500	12 May 1951

=== Round 5 ===
Home team	Home team score	Away team	Away team score	Venue	Crowd	Date
Hawthorn	7.18 (60)	North Melbourne	14.14 (98)	Glenferrie Oval	9,000	19 May 1951
Footscray	11.15 (81)	St Kilda	7.11 (53)	Western Oval	18,000	19 May 1951
Carlton	19.15 (129)	Fitzroy	10.12 (72)	Princes Park	24,500	19 May 1951
South Melbourne	15.6 (96)	Melbourne	11.12 (78)	Lake Oval	16,000	19 May 1951
Geelong	14.12 (96)	Essendon	10.8 (68)	Kardinia Park	24,500	19 May 1951
Richmond	16.20 (116)	Collingwood	9.11 (65)	Punt Road Oval	38,000	19 May 1951

=== Round 6 ===
Home team	Home team score	Away team	Away team score	Venue	Crowd	Date
Collingwood	13.15 (93)	South Melbourne	6.10 (46)	Victoria Park	19,000	2 June 1951
St Kilda	18.9 (117)	Richmond	19.12 (126)	Junction Oval	20,000	2 June 1951
North Melbourne	11.8 (74)	Geelong	12.16 (88)	Arden Street Oval	15,000	2 June 1951
Hawthorn	9.16 (70)	Footscray	7.17 (59)	Glenferrie Oval	10,000	2 June 1951
Fitzroy	14.7 (91)	Essendon	9.14 (68)	Brunswick Street Oval	24,000	2 June 1951
Melbourne	11.12 (78)	Carlton	8.10 (58)	MCG	30,000	2 June 1951

=== Round 7 ===
Home team	Home team score	Away team	Away team score	Venue	Crowd	Date
Geelong	20.13 (133)	Hawthorn	8.15 (63)	Kardinia Park	20,000	9 June 1951
Collingwood	13.19 (97)	St Kilda	11.12 (78)	Victoria Park	20,000	9 June 1951
Essendon	11.9 (75)	Carlton	13.12 (90)	Windy Hill	30,000	9 June 1951
Melbourne	9.13 (67)	Richmond	12.9 (81)	MCG	51,000	11 June 1951
Fitzroy	6.15 (51)	North Melbourne	12.12 (84)	Brunswick Street Oval	17,000	11 June 1951
South Melbourne	17.14 (116)	Footscray	9.15 (69)	Lake Oval	17,000	11 June 1951

=== Round 8 ===
Home team	Home team score	Away team	Away team score	Venue	Crowd	Date
Footscray	9.5 (59)	Geelong	11.11 (77)	Western Oval	19,500	16 June 1951
Essendon	15.13 (103)	St Kilda	12.7 (79)	Windy Hill	15,000	16 June 1951
Carlton	7.11 (53)	Collingwood	9.13 (67)	Princes Park	31,000	16 June 1951
North Melbourne	14.9 (93)	Melbourne	6.12 (48)	Arden Street Oval	13,000	16 June 1951
South Melbourne	12.14 (86)	Hawthorn	7.11 (53)	Lake Oval	8,500	16 June 1951
Richmond	9.12 (66)	Fitzroy	12.16 (88)	Punt Road Oval	26,000	16 June 1951

=== Round 9 ===
Home team	Home team score	Away team	Away team score	Venue	Crowd	Date
Geelong	10.14 (74)	Richmond	8.8 (56)	Kardinia Park	32,000	23 June 1951
Fitzroy	12.13 (85)	South Melbourne	12.13 (85)	Brunswick Street Oval	18,000	23 June 1951
Melbourne	5.19 (49)	Footscray	23.14 (152)	MCG	18,500	23 June 1951
North Melbourne	8.11 (59)	Essendon	13.13 (91)	Arden Street Oval	24,000	23 June 1951
Hawthorn	8.9 (57)	Collingwood	13.7 (85)	Glenferrie Oval	12,000	23 June 1951
St Kilda	9.11 (65)	Carlton	15.15 (105)	Junction Oval	17,000	23 June 1951

=== Round 10 ===
Home team	Home team score	Away team	Away team score	Venue	Crowd	Date
St Kilda	7.7 (49)	South Melbourne	13.15 (93)	Junction Oval	21,000	30 June 1951
Collingwood	10.12 (72)	Footscray	12.5 (77)	Victoria Park	25,000	30 June 1951
Carlton	14.20 (104)	North Melbourne	5.10 (40)	Princes Park	22,000	30 June 1951
Fitzroy	10.14 (74)	Hawthorn	11.9 (75)	Brunswick Street Oval	8,500	7 July 1951
Essendon	10.14 (74)	Richmond	10.10 (70)	Windy Hill	30,000	7 July 1951
Melbourne	7.7 (49)	Geelong	12.12 (84)	MCG	22,500	7 July 1951

=== Round 11 ===
Home team	Home team score	Away team	Away team score	Venue	Crowd	Date
Hawthorn	18.12 (120)	Melbourne	13.8 (86)	Glenferrie Oval	10,000	14 July 1951
Geelong	12.23 (95)	St Kilda	10.7 (67)	Kardinia Park	13,500	14 July 1951
Collingwood	15.13 (103)	Fitzroy	21.9 (135)	Victoria Park	22,000	14 July 1951
Richmond	11.13 (79)	North Melbourne	11.16 (82)	Punt Road Oval	15,000	14 July 1951
Footscray	7.14 (56)	Essendon	9.10 (64)	Western Oval	27,000	14 July 1951
South Melbourne	7.9 (51)	Carlton	7.14 (56)	Lake Oval	25,000	14 July 1951

=== Round 12 ===
Home team	Home team score	Away team	Away team score	Venue	Crowd	Date
Footscray	9.17 (71)	Richmond	6.9 (45)	Western Oval	20,000	21 July 1951
Fitzroy	11.10 (76)	St Kilda	4.16 (40)	Brunswick Street Oval	8,000	21 July 1951
South Melbourne	9.8 (62)	Geelong	18.11 (119)	Lake Oval	18,000	21 July 1951
Melbourne	8.6 (54)	Essendon	10.14 (74)	MCG	16,000	21 July 1951
North Melbourne	6.12 (48)	Collingwood	8.8 (56)	Arden Street Oval	14,000	21 July 1951
Hawthorn	5.8 (38)	Carlton	7.13 (55)	Glenferrie Oval	14,000	21 July 1951

=== Round 13 ===
Home team	Home team score	Away team	Away team score	Venue	Crowd	Date
Richmond	8.8 (56)	South Melbourne	13.17 (95)	Punt Road Oval	19,000	28 July 1951
Essendon	16.18 (114)	Hawthorn	8.11 (59)	Windy Hill	13,000	28 July 1951
Collingwood	18.21 (129)	Melbourne	12.10 (82)	Victoria Park	14,000	28 July 1951
Carlton	8.14 (62)	Footscray	9.11 (65)	Princes Park	34,000	28 July 1951
St Kilda	13.20 (98)	North Melbourne	10.10 (70)	Junction Oval	10,000	28 July 1951
Geelong	11.10 (76)	Fitzroy	4.5 (29)	Kardinia Park	25,500	28 July 1951

=== Round 14 ===
Home team	Home team score	Away team	Away team score	Venue	Crowd	Date
Fitzroy	8.21 (69)	Melbourne	6.9 (45)	Brunswick Street Oval	9,000	4 August 1951
Essendon	16.10 (106)	South Melbourne	8.12 (60)	Windy Hill	20,000	4 August 1951
St Kilda	11.8 (74)	Hawthorn	9.14 (68)	Junction Oval	6,000	4 August 1951
North Melbourne	10.10 (70)	Footscray	11.15 (81)	Arden Street Oval	14,000	4 August 1951
Geelong	3.11 (29)	Collingwood	4.7 (31)	Kardinia Park	26,500	4 August 1951
Richmond	9.12 (66)	Carlton	4.9 (33)	Punt Road Oval	17,000	4 August 1951

=== Round 15 ===
Home team	Home team score	Away team	Away team score	Venue	Crowd	Date
Melbourne	6.12 (48)	St Kilda	9.6 (60)	MCG	10,000	11 August 1951
Hawthorn	6.15 (51)	Richmond	10.13 (73)	Glenferrie Oval	11,000	11 August 1951
Collingwood	12.9 (81)	Essendon	5.7 (37)	Victoria Park	30,500	11 August 1951
Carlton	7.19 (61)	Geelong	12.11 (83)	Princes Park	17,500	11 August 1951
South Melbourne	14.16 (100)	North Melbourne	15.9 (99)	Lake Oval	10,000	11 August 1951
Footscray	4.6 (30)	Fitzroy	8.9 (57)	Western Oval	22,000	11 August 1951

=== Round 16 ===
Home team	Home team score	Away team	Away team score	Venue	Crowd	Date
Melbourne	15.16 (106)	South Melbourne	18.17 (125)	MCG	12,000	18 August 1951
Essendon	18.15 (123)	Geelong	8.17 (65)	Windy Hill	26,000	18 August 1951
Collingwood	9.12 (66)	Richmond	6.8 (44)	Victoria Park	25,500	18 August 1951
North Melbourne	10.11 (71)	Hawthorn	8.11 (59)	Arden Street Oval	6,000	18 August 1951
St Kilda	9.12 (66)	Footscray	11.15 (81)	Junction Oval	14,000	18 August 1951
Fitzroy	13.9 (87)	Carlton	13.9 (87)	Brunswick Street Oval	17,500	18 August 1951

=== Round 17 ===
Home team	Home team score	Away team	Away team score	Venue	Crowd	Date
Richmond	18.17 (125)	St Kilda	10.12 (72)	Punt Road Oval	14,000	25 August 1951
Geelong	13.15 (93)	North Melbourne	3.6 (24)	Kardinia Park	18,000	25 August 1951
Footscray	11.14 (80)	Hawthorn	9.10 (64)	Western Oval	14,000	25 August 1951
Essendon	11.13 (79)	Fitzroy	7.11 (53)	Windy Hill	30,000	25 August 1951
Carlton	15.16 (106)	Melbourne	8.13 (61)	Princes Park	11,000	25 August 1951
South Melbourne	12.9 (81)	Collingwood	12.10 (82)	Lake Oval	21,000	25 August 1951

=== Round 18 ===
Home team	Home team score	Away team	Away team score	Venue	Crowd	Date
Footscray	13.15 (93)	South Melbourne	6.12 (48)	Western Oval	24,500	1 September 1951
Carlton	9.10 (64)	Essendon	16.12 (108)	Princes Park	27,000	1 September 1951
Richmond	18.16 (124)	Melbourne	14.11 (95)	Punt Road Oval	10,000	1 September 1951
Hawthorn	5.8 (38)	Geelong	10.10 (70)	Glenferrie Oval	10,000	1 September 1951
North Melbourne	11.15 (81)	Fitzroy	8.13 (61)	Arden Street Oval	12,000	1 September 1951
St Kilda	9.18 (72)	Collingwood	10.19 (79)	Junction Oval	16,500	1 September 1951

== Ladder ==
(P)	Premiers
	Qualified for finals

#	Team	P	W	L	D	PF	PA	%	Pts
1	Geelong (P)	18	14	4	0	1485	1097	135.4	56
2	Collingwood	18	14	4	0	1499	1193	125.6	56
3	Essendon	18	13	5	0	1530	1262	121.2	52
4	Footscray	18	12	6	0	1316	1165	113.0	48
5	Fitzroy	18	10	6	2	1373	1305	105.2	44
6	Richmond	18	10	8	0	1551	1327	116.9	40
7	Carlton	18	8	9	1	1341	1253	107.0	34
8	South Melbourne	18	8	9	1	1399	1505	93.0	34
9	North Melbourne	18	7	11	0	1224	1433	85.4	28
10	St Kilda	18	5	13	0	1311	1595	82.2	20
11	Hawthorn	18	4	14	0	1136	1515	75.0	16
12	Melbourne	18	1	17	0	1230	1745	70.5	4

Rules for classification: 1. premiership points; 2. percentage; 3. points for
Average score: 75.9
Source: AFL Tables

== Finals series ==
=== Semi-finals ===
Team	1 Qtr	2 Qtr	3 Qtr	Final
Essendon	3.2	4.4	6.7	8.13 (61)
Footscray	6.1	7.1	7.5	8.5 (53)
Attendance: 66,135

Team	1 Qtr	2 Qtr	3 Qtr	Final
Geelong	2.3	10.6	13.14	22.20 (152)
Collingwood	6.3	7.5	9.7	10.10 (70)
Attendance: 74,085

=== Preliminary final ===
Team	1 Qtr	2 Qtr	3 Qtr	Final
Collingwood	1.2	7.4	9.7	10.8 (68)
Essendon	1.2	3.3	5.7	10.10 (70)
Attendance: 73,539

=== Grand final ===
Team	1 Qtr	2 Qtr	3 Qtr	Final
Geelong	3.8	4.10	9.13	11.15 (81)
Essendon	1.0	6.2	6.4	10.10 (70)
Attendance: 85,795

== Season notes ==
- The maximum match payment to players permissible under the league's "Coulter Law" was increased from £4-0-0 to £5-0-0 per match.
- The VFL established the Dr. W. C. McClelland Club Trophy, which was awarded on the basis of an aggregate of the performances of all three club teams, week by week, over the entire season. A First Eighteen win was worth 10 points, a Second Eighteen win was worth 4 points, and a Third Eighteen win was worth 2 points. In the case of a drawn match the relevant points are halved.
- In the best performance by a centre half-back since "Duncan's match" in 1927, South Melbourne's centre half-back Ron Clegg took 32 marks in the drawn match against Fitzroy.
- Essendon's full-forward John Coleman was reported for striking Carlton's back-pocket Harry Caspar in the last home and away match of the season. Coleman had scored seven goals during the match. Coleman was suspended for four matches and, as a consequence, he missed the entire final series (see Harry Caspar: "the man who cost Essendon the flag").
- In a desperate effort to cover for the loss of players through suspension, illness and injury, Essendon's coach Dick Reynolds came out of retirement and played in the Grand Final as 20th man. Reynolds came on in the last quarter. He did not score any goals and, when he accidentally bumped into Keith McDonald, he prevented McDonald taking a critical mark.

== Awards ==
- The 1951 VFL Premiership team was Geelong.
- The VFL's leading goalkicker was George Goninon of Geelong with 86 goals, including the finals series. John Coleman of Essendon was the leading goalkicker for the home-and-away season with 75 goals.
- The winner of the 1951 Brownlow Medal was Bernie Smith of Geelong with 23 votes.
- Melbourne took the "wooden spoon" in 1951.

== Sources ==
- 1951 VFL season at AFL Tables
- 1951 VFL season at Australian Football
