= 1951 VFL grand final =

Grand final of the 1951 Victorian Football League season

1951 VFL Grand Final

Geelong	Essendon
11.15 (81)	10.10 (70)
	1	2	3	4
GEE	3.8 (26)	4.10 (34)	9.13 (67)	11.15 (81)
ESS	1.0 (6)	6.2 (38)	6.4 (40)	10.10 (70)
- Date: 29 September 1951
- Stadium: Melbourne Cricket Ground
- Attendance: 84,109

The 1951 VFL Grand Final was an Australian rules football game contested between the Geelong Football Club and Essendon Football Club, held at the Melbourne Cricket Ground on 29 September 1951. It was the 54th annual Grand Final of the Victorian Football League, staged to determine the premiers for the 1951 VFL season.

== The match ==
=== Geelong ===
The match, attended by 84,109 spectators, was won by Geelong by 11 points (the club's fourth premiership). The win by Geelong — its first since winning the 1937 VFL Grand Final — capped off a brilliant season; the team won the Minor Premiership, its back-pocket, Bernie Smith, won the Brownlow Medal, and its full-forward, George Goninon, was the league's leading goalkicker.

=== Essendon ===
Essendon went into the match without star full-forward John Coleman who had been suspended in controversial circumstances for four matches. On the day of the match, champion ruckman John Gill had a heavy cold and declared himself unfit to play. At the last minute, the Essendon coach, Dick Reynolds, who had retired the year before, was re-registered as a player; Fred Payne replaced Gill in the run-on team, and Reynolds became 19th Man.

== Teams ==
Geelong	Essendon

Geelong
B:	Bernie Smith	Bruce Morrison	Loy Stewart
HB:	Bert Worner	John Hyde	Russell Middlemiss
C:	Syd Tate	Leo Turner	Terry Fulton
HF:	Russell Renfrey	Fred Flanagan (c)	Bob Davis
F:	Bill McMaster	George Goninon	Peter Pianto
Foll:	Tom Morrow	Jim Norman	Neil Trezise
Res:	Les Reed	Ron Hovey	
Coach:	Reg Hickey		

Essendon
B:	Les Gardiner	Bill Brittingham	Doug Bigelow
HB:	Harold Lambert	Roy McConnell	Norm McDonald
C:	Chris Lambert	Alan Dale	Lance Mann
HF:	Ron McEwin	Bill Snell	Jack Jones
F:	Fred Payne	Keith McDonald	Greg Tate
Foll:	Wally May	Bob Syme	Bill Hutchison (c)
Res:	Jack Clarke	Dick Reynolds	
Coach:	Dick Reynolds		

== Statistics ==
=== Score ===
Team	1 Qtr	2 Qtr	3 Qtr	Final
Geelong	3.8 (26)	4.10 (34)	9.13 (67)	11.15 (81)
Essendon	1.0 (6)	6.2 (38)	6.4 (40)	10.10 (70)
Attendance: 85,795

=== Goalkickers ===
Geelong:

- Goninon 4
- Davis 1
- Flanagan 1
- McMaster 1
- Morrow 1
- Norman 1
- Pianto 1
- Trezise 1

Essendon:

- K McDonald 2
- Syme 2
- Hutchison 1
- Jones 1
- May 1
- Payne 1
- Snell 1
- Tate 1

== See also ==
- 1951 VFL season
