= Shayne Breuer =

Australian rules footballer, born 1972

Personal information
- Full name: Shayne Breuer
- Born: 10 September 1972 (age 54)
- Original teams: Kalkee (Horsham DFL), Woodville-West Torrens (SANFL)
- Draft: 70th overall, 1993 National Draft (Geelong)
- Height: 184 cm (6 ft 0 in)
- Weight: 88 kg (194 lb)
- Position: Midfielder

Playing career^{1}
Years	Club	Games (Goals)
1994–1996	Geelong	71 (77)
1997–1999	Port Adelaide	54 (29)
Total		125 (106)
- ^{1} Playing statistics correct to the end of 1999.

Shayne Breuer (born 10 September 1972) is a former Australian rules footballer in the Australian Football League (AFL). He is notable for kicking Port Adelaide's first goal in the AFL.

== AFL career ==
=== Geelong (1994–1996) ===
Breuer began his career at Geelong and played in the 1994 and 1995 AFL Grand Finals, totaling 50 games in his first two seasons. As an on-baller in 1995, he scored 40 goals, including five goals in the qualifying final against Footscray.

=== Port Adelaide (1997–1999) ===
After a solid year in 1996, Breuer went on to play on with Port Adelaide in their inaugural year in 1997 where he kicked 17 goals and played 21 games. But after the 1997 season he struggled to get a spot in the team. He played three seasons with the Power before getting de-listed at the end of the 1999 season.

Breuer is mostly remembered by Port Adelaide fans for kicking Port Adelaide's first goal in the AFL.

=== Coaching career ===
Breuer had also coached Kalkee in the Horsham District Football League. After coaching Kalkee Football Club, he took on the coaching role at Horsham Saints Football Club where he led the club to back-to-back senior Wimmera Football League premierships in 2015 and 2016.

== Current status ==
Breuer played in the 2009 West End Slowdown. He has now retired from Kalkee and owns and manages sporting goods store Intersport in Horsham.
