= Ray Preston =

Ray Preston may refer to:

- Ray Preston (American football) (born 1954), American football player
- Ray Preston (rugby league) (1929–2019), Australian rugby league footballer
- Ray Preston (Australian footballer) (1930–2015), Australian rules footballer
