= Fred Payne (footballer) =

Australian rules footballer (1927–2025)

Personal information
- Full name: Frederick Ronald Payne
- Born: 4 February 1927
- Died: 24 June 2025 (aged 98); Tocumwal, Australia
- Original team: Ardmona
- Height: 182 cm (6 ft 0 in)
- Weight: 76 kg (168 lb)

Playing career^{1}
| Years | Club | Games (Goals) |
| 1949–1953 | Essendon | 42 (7) |
- ^{1} Playing statistics correct to the end of 1953.

Frederick Ronald Payne (4 February 1927 – 24 June 2025) was an Australian rules footballer who played with Essendon in the Victorian Football League (VFL).

== Biography ==
Payne experienced victory in the first 14 senior games that he played, but being part of a strong Essendon squad also meant it was difficult to command regular selection and he missed out on playing in their 1949 and 1950 premiership teams. He played as both a follower and forward during his career.

Originally from Ardmona, he made 16 appearances for Essendon in 1951. Payne missed both the semi-final and preliminary final with a thigh injury, but was named on the bench for the 1951 VFL Grand Final. He would end up starting the game in the forward pocket, after Essendon player John Gill had to withdraw.

In 1954 he joined Hawthorn, where he played in the seconds. Having been unable to make it into the seniors, Payne crossed to Bendigo Football League club Kyneton later in the year.

He continued playing across the state for the rest of the decade and throughout the 1960s, with stints at Sunbury, Murchison, Shepparton and Ardmona.

Payne died in Tocumwal on 24 June 2025, at the age of 98.
