= Vic Gross =

Australian rules footballer, born 1900

Personal information
- Full name: Ernest Victor Gross
- Born: 19 March 1900; Jung, Victoria
- Died: 18 November 1981 (aged 81); Point Lonsdale, Victoria
- Original team: Newtown / Geelong College
- Height: 183 cm (6 ft 0 in)
- Weight: 78 kg (172 lb)

Playing career^{1}
Years	Club	Games (Goals)
1919–22	Geelong	39 (2)
- ^{1} Playing statistics correct to the end of 1922.

Ernest Victor Gross (19 March 1900 – 18 November 1981) was an Australian rules footballer who played with Geelong in the Victorian Football League (VFL).
