= Joel Freijah =

Australian rules footballer

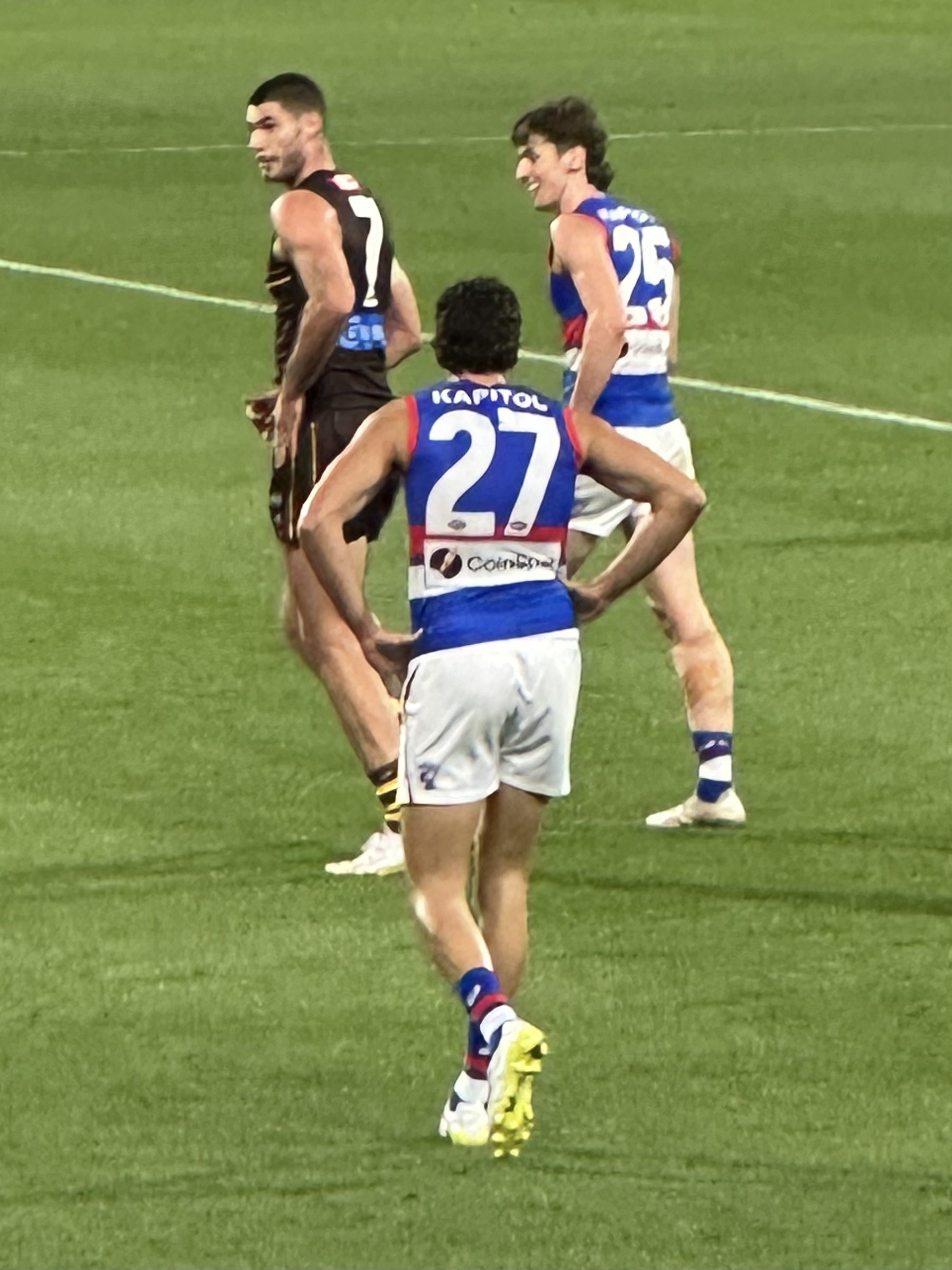
- Freijah (centre) in April 2026

Personal information
- Nicknames: Fridge, Baby Bont
- Born: 14 November 2005 (age 20)
- Original teams: GWV Rebels (Talent League); Horsham Saints (WFL)
- Draft: No. 45, 2023 national draft
- Debut: Round 9, 2024, Western Bulldogs vs. Richmond, at Melbourne Cricket Ground
- Height: 191 cm (6 ft 3 in)
- Weight: 88 kg (194 lb)
- Position: Midfielder

Club information
- Current club: Western Bulldogs
- Number: 27

Playing career^{1}
Years	Club	Games (Goals)
2024–	Western Bulldogs	61 (31)
- ^{1} Playing statistics correct to the end of the 2026 season.

Joel Freijah (born 14 November 2005) is a professional Australian rules footballer who plays for the Western Bulldogs in the Australian Football League (AFL).

== Early life ==
Growing up in Horsham, Victoria, Freijah supported the Carlton Football Club in the AFL. Freijah is of Lebanese descent.

After originally playing for the Horsham Saints Football Club in the Wimmera Football League, Freijah left home to attend boarding school at Ballarat Clarendon College and play for the Greater Western Victoria Rebels in the Talent League during 2022 and 2023.

== AFL career ==
With the 45th pick in the 2023 national draft, Freijah was selected by the Western Bulldogs. They recruited the Horsham native with the intent of playing him as a wingman. However, when Freijah eventually made his debut in round 9 of 2024, he began his senior career as a backman. On debut, Freijah had 17 disposals against Richmond at the Melbourne Cricket Ground. A successful debut year came to an end as the Bulldogs lost to Hawthorn in the elimination final.

Freijah cemented his position in the Bulldogs' team early in 2025, averaging 25 disposals and a goal across his first two games against North Melbourne and Collingwood. Later in 2025, Freijah starred in the Bulldogs' win over Sydney, kicking four goals from his 23 disposals.

== Statistics ==
Updated to the end of round 22, 2026.

Legend
G	Goals	K	Kicks	D	Disposals	T	Tackles
B	Behinds	H	Handballs	M	Marks

Season	Team	No.	Games	Totals							Averages (per game)							Votes
Season	Team	No.	Games	G	B	K	H	D	M	T	G	B	K	H	D	M	T	Votes
2024	Western Bulldogs	27	13	1	2	122	84	206	70	17	0.1	0.2	9.4	6.5	15.8	5.4	1.3	0
2025	Western Bulldogs	27	23	18	10	222	215	437	82	61	0.8	0.4	9.7	9.3	19.0	3.6	2.7	6
2026	Western Bulldogs	27	21	8	10	207	183	390	83	76	0.4	0.5	9.9	8.7	18.6	4.0	3.6	0
Career			57	27	22	551	482	1033	235	154	0.5	0.4	9.7	8.5	18.1	4.1	2.7	6
