= Shane Loveless =

Australian rules footballer

Personal information
- Full name: Shane Loveless
- Born: 15 November 1958 (age 67)
- Original team: Sale (LVFL)
- Height: 196 cm (6 ft 5 in)
- Weight: 98 kg (216 lb)
- Position: Full-forward

Playing career^{1}
Years	Club	Games (Goals)
1979–1981	Footscray	28 (72)
- ^{1} Playing statistics correct to the end of 1981.

Shane Loveless (born 15 November 1958) is a former Australian rules footballer who played with Footscray in the Victorian Football League (VFL).

Loveless is best known as a prolific full-forward in country football, mostly for Victoria clubs, starting at Latrobe Valley Football League club Sale. He would continue playing across the state until the age of 46, by which time he had amassed over 2000 goals, from no less than 16 clubs.

After arriving at Footscray from Sale, Loveless put together just two games in the 1979 VFL season but became their regular full-forward in 1980. He had his best run of form mid-season, with eight goals in a win over Fitzroy and another seven against South Melbourne the following week. Another eight goal haul came soon after, against Hawthorn at Western Oval, and he finished the year with 44 goals. It was not enough to top Footscray's goal-kicking, which went yet again to Kelvin Templeton. With Loveless spending the season in the goalsquare, Templeton had been used as a centre half-forward and won the 1980 Brownlow Medal. Loveless was however Footscray's equal leading goal-kicker in 1981, with Jim Edmond on 25 goals, as Templeton was injured for most of the year. In 1982 Footscray recruited WAFL star Simon Beasley, who took one of the club's key-forward positions. As a result, Loveless was stuck in the reserves and despite good performances, was not able to earn a call-up to the seniors and decided to leave the VFL.

He was recruited by Glenorchy for the remainder of their 1982 Tasmanian Football League campaign. A four-week suspension for striking Ray Riewoldt, uncle of AFL players Jack and Nick Riewoldt, meant he would play only a few TFL games.

For the rest of his career, Loveless was constantly on the move, setting new goal-kicking records as he went. He twice kicked 25 goals in a league game and managed to top 100 goals in a season on seven occasions. Back at Sale in 1986, he participated in their only premiership of the decade, one of five premiership teams that he played in.

His complete list of clubs are Sale, Footscray, Glenorchy, Tatura, Kyabram, Nambrok, Gunbower, Casterton, South Gambier, Apsley, Kerang Rovers, Colbinabbin, Ardmona, Nagambie, Heyfield and Boisdale-Briagolong.
