= Loy Stewart =

Australian rules footballer

Personal information
- Full name: David Loy Stewart
- Born: 19 May 1927; Parkville, Victoria
- Died: 19 August 2010 (aged 83)
- Original team: Albury
- Height: 183 cm (6 ft 0 in)
- Weight: 83 kg (183 lb)

Playing career^{1}
Years	Club	Games (Goals)
1951–1952	Geelong	22 (2)
- ^{1} Playing statistics correct to the end of 1952.

David Loy Stewart (19 May 1927 – 19 August 2010) was an Australian rules footballer who played for Geelong in the Victorian Football League (VFL) during the early 1950s.

Stewart enlisted in the Australian Army shortly after his eighteenth birthday and served until 1947.

Stewart came to Geelong from Albury and in his brief career was used mostly in the ruck and defence. He was a back pocket in Geelong's 1951 VFL Grand Final win over Essendon in 1951.
