= Terry Fulton =

Australian rules footballer (1930–2022)

Personal information
- Full name: Terence Ronald Fulton
- Born: 17 April 1930
- Died: 15 July 2022 (aged 92)
- Original team: East Geelong (GDFL)
- Height: 173 cm (5 ft 8 in)
- Weight: 72 kg (159 lb)

Playing career^{1}
Years	Club	Games (Goals)
1949–1954	Geelong	51 (3)
- ^{1} Playing statistics correct to the end of 1954.

Career highlights
- Geelong Premiership 1951, 1952

Terence Ronald Fulton (17 April 1930 – 15 July 2022) was an Australian rules footballer in the Victorian Football League (VFL). A speedy wingman, he played in Geelong's 1951 and 1952 VFL premierships.
