= Harrow Balmoral Football Netball Club =

Local football club in the Horsham District Football League, Australia

Harrow Balmoral

Names
- Nickname: Southern Roos

Club details
- Founded: 1996; 30 years ago
- Colours: Blue White
- Competition: Horsham District Football League
- Premierships: Football; Seniors (8):1999, 2002, 2004, 2007, 2018, 2019, 2023, 2024, 2025; Reserves (2): 2014, 2019; U/17s (2): 2008, 2019; U/16s (1): 2003; U/14s (1):2015; U/13s (1): 2006 Netball; A Grade (5): 1997, 1999, 2013, 2014, 2016; B Grade (2): 1999, 2016; C Grade (5): 2006, 2011, 2012, 2013, 2014; C Reserve (1): 2014; U/17s (6): 1999, 2002, 2003, 2009, 2010, 2018; U15s (0); U13s (4): 2004, 2005, 2006, 2016
- Ground: Harrow Recreation Reserve; Balmoral Recreation Reserve

Uniforms
Home

The Harrow Balmoral Football Netball Club is a sports club based in the towns of Harrow and Balmoral in Western Victoria, Australia. The club has netball and Australian Rules Football teams competing in the Horsham District Football League.

== History ==
The club was formed following a merger of Balmoral Football Club and Douglas-Harrow-Miga Lake Football Club in November 1996. A coin toss by new president Tom Houlihan determined the name to be Harrow Balmoral and not Balmoral Harrow.

The theme song is "We are Blue, We are White", sung to the tune of "Along the Road to Gundagai".

Harrow-Balmoral won its first football seniors premiership in 1999, defeating Kalkee Football Club by 1 point. The A Grade Netball won their first premiership in the club's first year, 1997. They won again in 1999, also beating Kalkee with the exact same score as the football (46 to 45). The senior footballers have won seven further premierships in the Horsham & District Football League, including their most recent trifecta in 2023, 2024 and 2025.

Harrow Balmoral maintain a rivalry with neighbouring club Edenhope Apsley. They play for the West Wimmera Shield every year, of which the winner is the club with the most wins when the two sides meet.

The Australian Broadcasting Corporation (ABC) released the investigative podcast series Hometown Boys as part of its Background Briefing program, examining the case of two men from Balmoral who were convicted and sentenced on rape charges. Episode six of the series included discussion of local community institutions, including the Harrow Balmoral Football Netball Club, in the context of the program's reporting on the case.

The two convicted rapists are no longer part of the club. The club made a statement after Hometown Boys was released addressing the rape cases and further allegations made towards the club.

== Teams and Grades ==
Grade	Coach	Captain	Premierships
Seniors Football	Jai Thompson		1999, 2002, 2004, 2007, 2018, 2019, 2023, 2024, 2025
Reserves Football	Tim Crick		2014, 2019
Under 17s Football			2008, 2019
Under 14s Football			2015
Under 11s Football	Ed Ferguson		
A Grade Netball	Britt Burns		1997, 1999, 2013, 2014, 2016
B Grade Netball			1999, 2016
C Grade Netball			2006, 2011, 2012, 2013, 2014
C Reserve Netball			2014
Under 17s Netball			1999, 2002, 2003, 2009, 2010, 2018
Under 15s Netball			
Under 13s Netball			2004, 2005, 2006, 2016
