= Jarrod Berry =

Australian rules footballer

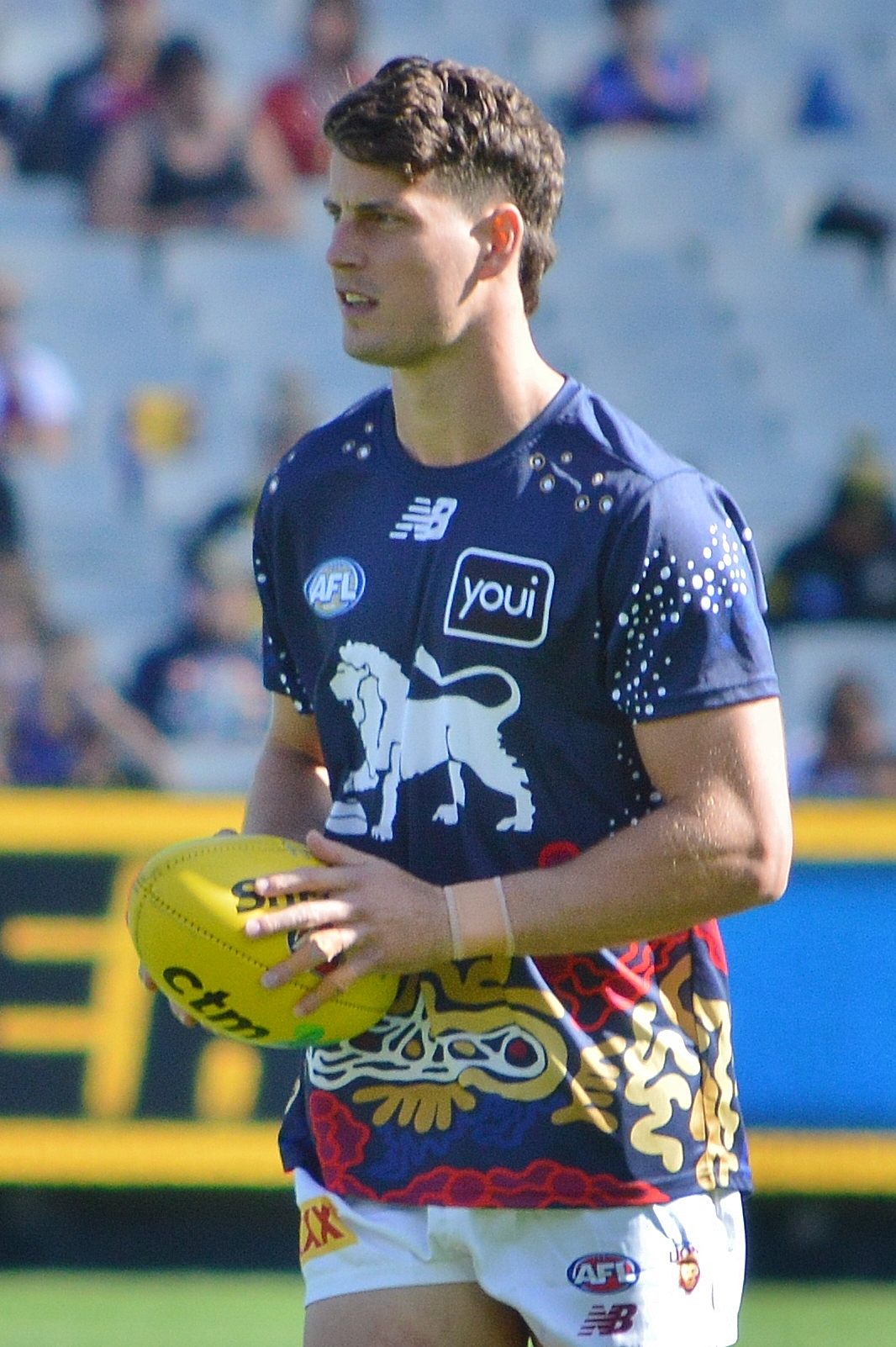
- Berry in April 2025

Personal information
- Full name: Jarrod Berry
- Born: 5 February 1998 (age 28)
- Original team: North Ballarat Rebels (TAC Cup)
- Draft: No. 17, 2016 national draft
- Debut: Round 3, 2017, Brisbane Lions vs. St Kilda, at Etihad Stadium
- Height: 192 cm (6 ft 4 in)
- Weight: 90 kg (198 lb)
- Position: Midfielder

Club information
- Current club: Brisbane Lions
- Number: 7

Playing career^{1}
| Years | Club | Games (Goals) |
| 2017– | Brisbane Lions | 200 (76) |
- ^{1} Playing statistics correct to the end of round 22, 2026.

Career highlights
- 2x AFL premiership player: 2024, 2026

Jarrod Berry (born 5 February 1998) is a professional Australian rules footballer playing for the Brisbane Lions in the Australian Football League (AFL). He was drafted by Brisbane with their second selection and seventeenth overall in the 2016 national draft. He made his debut in the thirty-one point loss against St Kilda at Etihad Stadium in round three of the 2017 season.

== Junior career ==
Berry was born and raised in Horsham, Victoria along with his younger brother, Tom Berry, who was previously Jarrod's teammate at the Brisbane Lions. Jarrod was a standout junior, playing local football with the Horsham Saints and with the North Ballarat Rebels in the then, TAC cup. He was a standout bottom age player in the TAC cup, winning All-Australian and team of the year honours in 2015. He was highly touted as a possible number 1 draft pick for the 2016 season, although injuries and inconsistent form hampered his top age year. He captained Vic Country at the AFL Under 18 Championships in 2016, and he further improved his draft stock at the draft combine, winning both the 3 km time trial and the beep test, showing his competitiveness and endurance. He was eventually selected at pick 17 in the 2016 AFL draft alongside his best mate, Hugh McCluggage.

== AFL career ==
Berry was part of the Brisbane Lions' 2024 premiership-winning team, registering 20 disposals and a goal in a dominant 60-point win.

Berry missed out on Brisbane's 2025 premiership after dislocating his shoulder in their preliminary final victory over Collingwood, but he would win his second premiership in 2026 as the Lions defeated Fremantle.

== Statistics ==
Updated to the end of the 2026 Grand Final.

Legend
| G | Goals | K | Kicks | D | Disposals | T | Tackles |
| B | Behinds | H | Handballs | M | Marks |
| # | Played in that season's premiership team |

| Season | Team | No. | Games | Totals | | | | | | | Averages (per game) | | | | | | | Votes |
| Season | Team | No. | Games | G | B | K | H | D | M | T | G | B | K | H | D | M | T | Votes |
|---|---|---|---|---|---|---|---|---|---|---|---|---|---|---|---|---|---|---|
| 2017 | Brisbane Lions | 13 | 16 | 7 | 3 | 92 | 127 | 219 | 56 | 61 | 0.4 | 0.2 | 5.8 | 7.9 | 13.7 | 3.5 | 3.8 | 0 |
| 2018 | Brisbane Lions | 13 | 21 | 12 | 5 | 175 | 213 | 388 | 83 | 100 | 0.6 | 0.2 | 8.3 | 10.1 | 18.5 | 4.0 | 4.8 | 1 |
| 2019 | Brisbane Lions | 7 | 20 | 8 | 10 | 211 | 181 | 392 | 89 | 76 | 0.4 | 0.5 | 10.6 | 9.1 | 19.6 | 4.5 | 3.8 | 1 |
| 2020 (Note: The 2020 season was played with 17 home-and-away matches per team (down from 22) and 16-minute quarters with time on (down from 20-minute quarters with time on) due to the impact of the COVID-19 pandemic.) | Brisbane Lions | 7 | 17 | 7 | 10 | 155 | 116 | 271 | 70 | 64 | 0.4 | 0.6 | 9.1 | 6.8 | 15.9 | 4.1 | 3.8 | 8 |
| 2021 | Brisbane Lions | 7 | 11 | 5 | 2 | 75 | 63 | 138 | 24 | 34 | 0.5 | 0.2 | 6.8 | 5.7 | 12.5 | 2.2 | 3.1 | 0 |
| 2022 | Brisbane Lions | 7 | 23 | 9 | 7 | 245 | 167 | 412 | 106 | 81 | 0.4 | 0.3 | 10.7 | 7.3 | 17.9 | 4.6 | 3.5 | 2 |
| 2023 | Brisbane Lions | 7 | 25 | 10 | 5 | 268 | 172 | 440 | 119 | 64 | 0.4 | 0.2 | 10.7 | 6.9 | 17.6 | 4.8 | 2.6 | 1 |
| 2024^{#} | Brisbane Lions | 7 | 27 | 6 | 8 | 302 | 238 | 540 | 167 | 96 | 0.2 | 0.3 | 11.2 | 8.8 | 20.0 | 6.2 | 3.6 | 0 |
| 2025 | Brisbane Lions | 7 | 24 | 9 | 6 | 291 | 186 | 477 | 137 | 79 | 0.4 | 0.3 | 12.1 | 7.8 | 19.9 | 5.7 | 3.3 | 0 |
| 2026^{#} | Brisbane Lions | 7 | 22 | 5 | 8 | 247 | 156 | 403 | 114 | 58 | 0.2 | 0.4 | 11.2 | 7.0 | 18.3 | 5.2 | 2.6 | 3 |
| Career | | | 206 | 78 | 64 | 2061 | 1619 | 3680 | 965 | 713 | 0.4 | 0.3 | 10.0 | 7.9 | 17.9 | 4.7 | 3.5 | 16 |

== Honours and achievements ==
Team

- AFL Premiership player: 2024 2026
- McClelland Trophy / Club Championship: 2025
