= Ardmona Football Club =

Australian rules football club

Ardmona

Names
- Full name: Ardmona Football Club
- Nickname(s): Bush Cats

Club details
- Founded: 1920
- Colours: Navy Blue White
- Competition: Kyabram DFL since 1957
- Premierships: 1932, 1933, 1935, 1936, 1947, 1993, 1995, 1996, 2002, 2006.
- Ground(s): Ardmona Recreation Reserve

Uniforms
Home

The Ardmona Football Club was an Australian rules football club from the Goulburn Valley town of Ardmona, Victoria, Australia that played in the Kyabram & District Football League. The club has gone into recess since 2021.

== History ==
Ardmona Football Club was established in 1920 by the local young men of Ardmona, playing in Wednesday afternoon competitions at the primary school grounds. An attempt was made in 1920 to secure a ground for the club but the deal was not brought to completion. A letter to the editor in the Shepparton Advertiser in November 1921 claimed that Ardmona needed a recreation ground for the locals to utilize. The local young men were travelling to Mooroopna to play sport.

Ardmona played its first league game in the Toolamba District Association on 24 June 1922 against Toolamba. In 1923 a committee was formed to raise funds to secure land for an oval.

In May 1923, a public meeting was held to discuss the question for an Ardmona Recreation Reserve. There was a very large attendance and two sites were discussed, either 10 acres north of Ardmona Store or 20 acres next to the property of Mr Eli North. The latter property was purchased with community donations and Messrs. W, J. Pearson, A. Lenne, C. W. Norton, J. Simson, E. Young and E.North were appointed as trustees.

The club has played in the Goulburn Valley Football Association, the Central Goulburn Valley Football League and the Kyabram & District Football League.

Ardmona played in eight Goulburn Valley Second Eighteens Football Association grand finals between 1928 and 1936, winning four premierships.

The Cats consistently featured among the K&DFNL competition's pace setters – for a time, earning a total of 15 football Premiership Flags. Since 2015, the Cats have struggled on field and financially.

2019 saw the club faced with suspension. The club was featured on Channel 7's Sunday Night Program in a bid to help raise funds to pay debts. On 14 November 2019 the club was suspended from the league, but after a successful appeal to AFL they were reinstated on 17 December 2019.

Shane Crawford signed to coach the Ardmona Cats for the 2020 and 2021 seasons. At the end of season the club entered into recess due to player shortage.

== Football Premierships ==
Seniors

- Goulburn Valley Second Eighteens Football Association
  - 1932, 1933, 1935, 1936
- Central Goulburn Valley Football League
  - 1947
- Kyabram & District Football League
  - 1993, 1995, 1996, 2002, 2006

Reserves

- Kyabram & District Football League
  - 1968, 1969, 1976, 1993, 1996, 1997, 2006

Thirds / Under 18's

- Kyabram & District Football League
  - 1971, 1972, 2014

== Football – Runners Up ==
Seniors

- Goulburn Valley Second Eighteens Football Association
  - 1928, 1929, 1930, 1934
- Kyabram & District Football League
  - 1974, 1992, 1997, 2007, 2008,

== Football League – Best & Fairest Winners ==
SENIORS

Kyabram & District Football League

- 1968 – Colin Barnes. (Barnes also won the 1960 & 1961 Ovens & King Football League Best & Fairest award)
- 1972 – D. McKellar
- 1979 – G. Saunders
- 2005 – B. Lowe
- 2008 – M. Young
- 2019 – C. Atkinson

RESERVES

Kyabram & District Football League

- 2013 – D. Moor
- 2014 – X. Hand
- 2019 – B. Lodding

THIRDS

Kyabram & District Football League

- 2013 – J. Castle
- 2014 – S. Cashion
- 2019 – T. Lackmann

== Leading Goal Kickers ==
Kyabram & District Football League

- 1969 – Stan Atkinson, (100)
- 1974 – Stuart Florence, (101)
- 1992 – Perry Meka, (151)
- 1993 – Perry Meka, (143)
- 1995 – Shane Loveless, (125)
- 1996 – Shane Loveless, (140)
- 2002 – Damien Yze, (129)
- 2006 – Perry Meka, (138)
- 2007 – Perry Meka, (105)
- 2008 – Adrian Meka, (97)

== VFL / AFL Players ==
The following footballers played with Ardmona prior to making their VFL / AFL debut.

- 1949: Fred Payne – Essendon
- 1953: Ray Preston - South Melbourne

The following footballers either played in the VFL / AFL or were drafted prior to making their debut with Ardmona FC.

- Shane Loveless – Footscray
- Perry Meka – Footscray. Pick No. 58 in the 1986 VFL Draft
