= Tom Berry (Australian footballer) =

Australian rules footballer

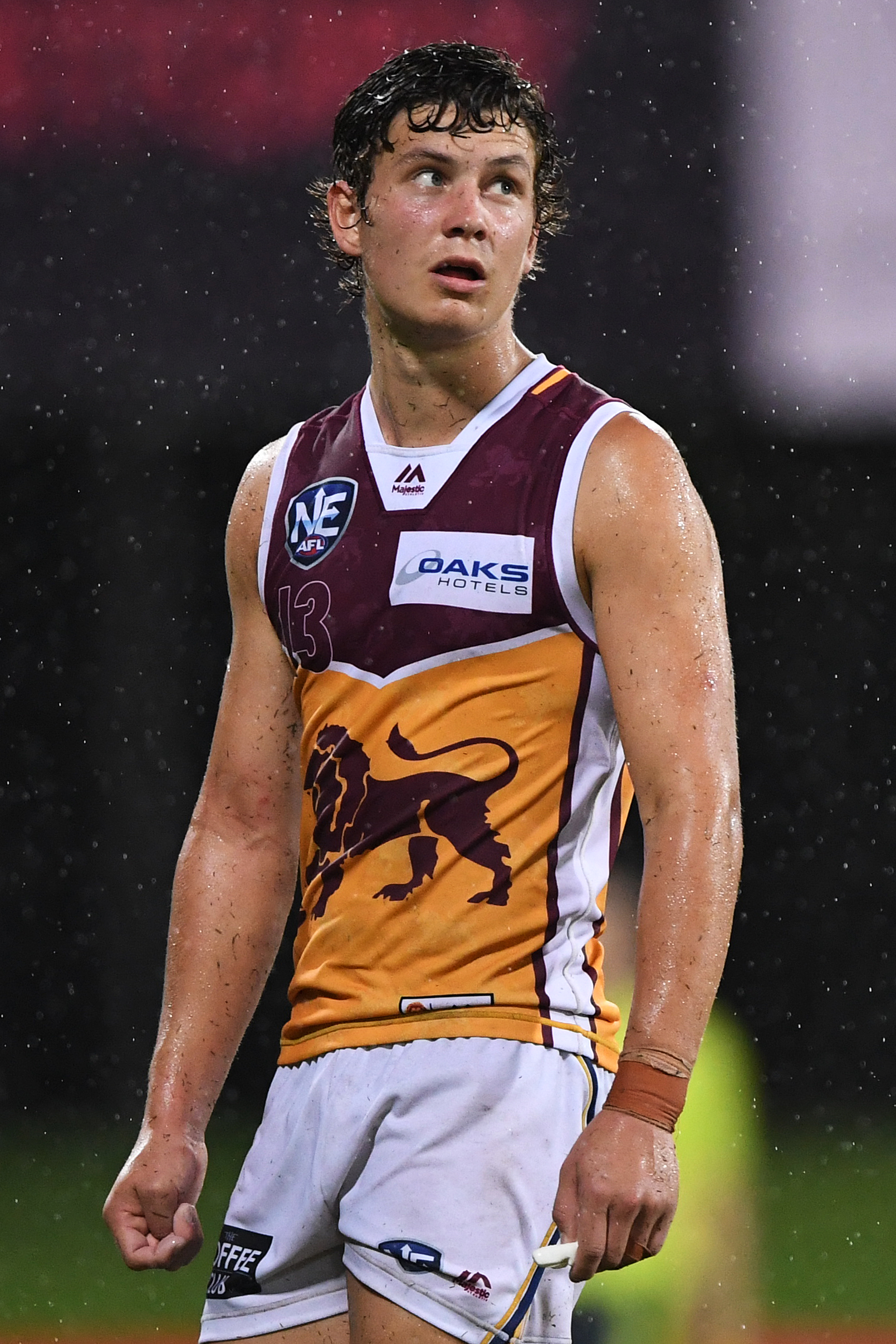
- Berry in April 2019

Personal information
- Born: 1 May 2000 (age 26)
- Original team: GWV Rebels
- Draft: No. 36, 2018 AFL draft, Brisbane Lions
- Debut: 13 June 2020, Brisbane Lions vs. Fremantle, at The Gabba
- Height: 185 cm (6 ft 1 in)
- Weight: 76 kg (168 lb)
- Position: Forward

Club information
- Current club: Southport
- Number: 16

Playing career^{1}
Years	Club	Games (Goals)
2019–2022	Brisbane Lions	20 (3)
2023-2025	Gold Coast	23 (3)
Total		43 (6)
- ^{1} Playing statistics correct to the end of 2024.

Thomas Berry (born 1 May 2000) is a professional Australian rules footballer who currently plays for the Southport Sharks in the Victorian Football League (VFL), having previously played for the Gold Coast Suns and the Brisbane Lions in the Australian Football League (AFL). He is the brother of his former Brisbane teammate Jarrod Berry.

== Early football ==
Berry played football for the Horsham Saints Football Club in the Wimmera Football League. He then played for the Greater Western Victoria Rebels in the NAB League, before being selected by Brisbane. He then played 20 games in the club's undefeated NEAFL side for 2019. He completed school while boarding at Ballarat Clarendon College.

== AFL career ==
Berry debuted for Brisbane in the second round of the 2020 AFL season, against Fremantle at the Gabba. Berry picked up 9 disposals, 3 marks and a tackle. He was nominated for Mark of the Year in his debut match, "showing great courage in his first AFL game to take a mark like this with the commentary team comparing him to the great Jonathan Brown."

Following the 2022 AFL season, Berry requested a trade to Gold Coast seeking greater opportunity, and was traded on 5 October.

== Statistics ==
Statistics are correct to the end of 2025

Legend
G	Goals	K	Kicks	D	Disposals	T	Tackles
B	Behinds	H	Handballs	M	Marks

Season	Team	No.	Games	Totals							Averages (per game)						
Season	Team	No.	Games	G	B	K	H	D	M	T	G	B	K	H	D	M	T
2019	Brisbane Lions	13	0	—	—	—	—	—	—	—	—	—	—	—	—	—	—
2020 (Note: The 2020 season was played with 17 home-and-away matches per team (down from 22) and 16-minute quarters with time on (down from 20-minute quarters with time on) due to the impact of the COVID-19 pandemic.)	Brisbane Lions	13	6	0	2	16	25	41	10	12	0.0	0.3	2.7	4.2	6.8	1.7	2.0
2021	Brisbane Lions	13	11	2	1	14	23	37	6	20	0.2	0.1	1.3	2.1	3.4	0.5	1.8
2022	Brisbane Lions	13	3	1	2	7	11	18	4	7	0.3	0.7	2.3	3.7	6.0	1.3	2.3
2023	Gold Coast	16	6	0	2	24	16	40	10	19	0.0	0.3	4.0	2.7	6.7	1.7	3.2
2024	Gold Coast	16	17	3	5	107	89	196	43	47	0.2	0.3	6.3	5.2	11.5	2.5	2.8
2025	Gold Coast	16	0	—	—	—	—	—	—	—	—	—	—	—	—	—	—
Career			43	6	12	168	164	332	73	105	0.1	0.3	3.9	3.8	7.7	1.7	2.4
