= West Wimmera Football League =

Australian rules football league

The West Wimmera Football League was the final name of an Australian rules football league based in the Wimmera area of Western Victoria.

== History ==
=== Central Wimmera Football 1922-1968 ===
This competition started in 1922 with teams from Horsham Seconds, Jung, Natimuk, Quantong and Toolondo. Prior to the merger the Central Wimmera consisted of Balmoral, Douglas-Miga Lake, Goroke, Horsham Football Club Seconds, Natimuk and Noradjuha. A majority of these teams were based west of Horsham, Victoria. Pimpinio had joined the Horsham & District Football League the previous year and Peronne folded in 1967.

=== Lowan Star 1923-1968 ===
The Lowan Star Association was based around settlements close to Nhill. This competition started in 1923 between teams from Kinimakatka, Propodallah and Winiam Imperials. The final teams were, Cannum, Dimboola Seconds, Gerang-Kiata, Jeparit Seconds, Netherby-Lorquon, Nhill Seconds, Warracknabeal Seconds and Winiam. All of the standalone teams joined the merged league apart from Cannum which joined the Horsham & District until they folded in 1971.

The seconds sides were required to move into the Wimmera Football League second XVIII competition, which was the major league of the district, this provoked the change for a merged league.

=== Central Wimmera-Lowan Star/West Wimmera 1969-1981 ===
In 1969 the Central Wimmera Football League merged with the Lowan Star Football League to create the Central Wimmera-Lowan Star Football League. In 1979 the league changed its name to the West Wimmera Football League.

== Clubs ==
=== Final clubs in 1981 ===
Club	Jumper	Nickname	Home Ground	Former League	Est.	Years in comp	WWFL Senior Premierships		Fate
Club	Jumper	Nickname	Home Ground	Former League	Est.	Years in comp	Total	Years	Fate
Balmoral		Bombers	Balmoral Recreation Reserve, Balmoral	CWFA	1900s	1969-1981	5	1970, 1971, 1972, 1974, 1980	Moved to South West District FL in 1982
Douglas-Harrow-Miga Lake		Demons	Harrow Recreation Reserve, Harrow and Wombelano Recreation Reserve, Wombelano	–	1970	1970-1981	2	1973, 1979	Moved to Horsham & District FL in 1982
Gerang-Kiata		Highway Men	Kiata Recreation Reserve, Kiata	LSFA	1962	1969-1981	1	1969	Moved to Horsham & District FL in 1982
Goroke		Magpies	Goroke Recreation Reserve, Goroke	CWFA	1890s	1969-1981	1	1981	Moved to Horsham & District FL in 1982
Netherby-Lorquon		Saints	Netherby Memorial Park, Netherby	LSFA	1962	1969-1981	0	-	Moved to Horsham & District FL in 1982
Noradjuha		Grass Parrots	Noradjuha Recreation Reserve, Noradjuha	CWFA	1900s	1969-1981	4	1975, 1976, 1977, 1978	Moved to Horsham & District FL in 1982

=== Previous clubs ===
Club	Jumper	Nickname	Home Ground	Former League	Est.	Years in comp	WWFL Senior Premierships		Fate
Club	Jumper	Nickname	Home Ground	Former League	Est.	Years in comp	Total	Years	Fate
Douglas-Miga Lake		Rovers	Wombelano Recreation Reserve, Wombelano	CWFA	1948	1969	0	-	Merged with Harrow from the Glenelg FL in 1970 to form Douglas-Harrow-Miga Lake
Natimuk		Rams	Natimuk Showgrounds, Natimuk	CWFA	c.1900s	1969-1970	0	-	Moved to Horsham & District FL in 1971
Winiam		Imperials	Davis Park, Nhill	LSFA	1934	1969-1970	0	-	Folded in 1971

== Grand Finals ==
- 1969 – Gerang-Kiata 18.12 (120) def Goroke 7.4 (46)
- 1970 – Balmoral 12.11 (83) def Gerang-Kiata 11.3 (69)
- 1971 – Balmoral 10.14 (74) def Douglas-Harrow-Miga Lake 10.9 (69)
- 1972 – Balmoral 15.19 (109) def Gerang-Kiata 13.13 (91)
- 1973 – Douglas-Harrow-Miga Lake 14.10 (94) def Balmoral 9.18 (72)
- 1974 – Balmoral 11.11 (77) def Noradjuha 11.10 (76)
- 1975 – Noradjuha 16.18 (114) def Balmoral 8.8 (56)
- 1976 – Noradjuha 18.14 (122) def Douglas-Harrow-Miga Lake 11.6 (72)
- 1977 – Noradjuha 26.7 (163) def Gerang Kiata 15.13 (103)
- 1978 – Noradjuha 23.9 (147) def Goroke 12.15 (87)
- 1979 – Douglas-Harrow-Miga Lake 23.14 (152) def Noradjuha 12.10 (82)
- 1980 – Balmoral 9.15 (69) def Goroke 9.9 (63)
- 1981 – Goroke 17.16 (118) def Balmoral 9.9 (63)

== 1979 Ladder ==
West Wimmera FL	Wins	Byes	Losses	Draws	For	Against	%	Pts	Final	Team	G	B	Pts	Team	G	B	Pts
Douglas-Harrow-Miga Lake	12	0	3	0	1533	1020	150.29%	48	1st Semi	Gerang - Kiata	9	13	67	Goroke	7	6	48
Noradjuha	7	0	8	0	1308	1237	105.74%	28	2nd Semi	Douglas-Harrow-Miga Lake	15	11	101	Noradjuha	13	5	83
Gerang - Kiata	7	0	8	0	1289	1375	93.75%	28	Preliminary	Noradjuha	15	17	107	Gerang - Kiata	13	14	92
Goroke	7	0	8	0	1212	1374	88.21%	28	Grand	Douglas-Harrow-Miga Lake	23	14	152	Noradjuha	12	10	82
Balmoral	7	0	8	0	1118	1325	84.38%	28									
Netherby-Lorquon	5	0	10	0	1295	1424	90.94%	20									

== 1980 Ladder ==
West Wimmera FL	Wins	Byes	Losses	Draws	For	Against	%	Pts	Final	Team	G	B	Pts	Team	G	B	Pts
Balmoral	14	0	1	0	1470	1025	143.41%	56	1st Semi	Goroke	18	18	126	Noradjuha	18	10	118
Douglas-Harrow-Miga Lake	9	0	6	0	1360	1260	107.94%	36	2nd Semi	Balmoral	18	14	122	Douglas-Harrow-Miga Lake	6	4	40
Goroke	8	0	7	0	1326	1304	101.69%	32	Preliminary	Goroke	13	23	101	Douglas-Harrow-Miga Lake	5	11	41
Noradjuha	5	0	10	0	1396	1400	99.71%	20	Grand	Balmoral	9	15	69	Goroke	9	9	63
Netherby-Lorquon	5	0	10	0	1208	1463	82.57%	20									
Gerang - Kiata	4	0	11	0	1309	1617	80.95%	16									

== 1981 Ladder ==
West Wimmera FL	Wins	Byes	Losses	Draws	For	Against	%	Pts	Final	Team	G	B	Pts	Team	G	B	Pts
Goroke	13	0	2	0	1541	981	157.08%	52	1st Semi	Noradjuha	6	8	44	Douglas-Harrow-Miga Lake	10	13	73
Balmoral	10	0	5	0	1414	1105	127.96%	40	2nd Semi	Goroke	6	4	40	Balmoral	8	4	52
Noradjuha	8	0	7	0	1409	1225	115.02%	32	Preliminary	Goroke	11	9	75	Douglas-Harrow-Miga Lake	6	12	48
Douglas-Harrow-Miga Lake	8	0	7	0	1321	1339	98.66%	32	Grand	Goroke	17	16	118	Balmoral	9	9	63
Gerang - Kiata	5	0	10	0	1242	1614	76.95%	20									
Netherby-Lorquon	1	0	14	0	1156	1788	64.65%	4									

== VFL Players from WWFL ==
Balmoral

- Brett Gloury - Collingwood

Norajuha

- Peter Light - Essendon
