= Horsham District Football League =

Amateur Australian rules football league

- Formerly: Horsham Junior Football League
- Sport: Australian rules football
- Founded: 1934; 92 years ago
- COO: Corey Fox
- President: Steve Hoffmann
- No. of teams: 11
- Country: Australia
- Most recent champions: Seniors: Laharum (2026); Reserves: Noradjuha-Quantong (2026)
- Most titles: Kalkee (15)
- Website: Horsham DFNL Play HQ

The Horsham District Football League is an amateur Australian rules football league based in the Wimmera area of Western Victoria.

== History ==
Prior to World War II a number of local Australian Rules football leagues existed around Horsham. The clubs that played in Horsham Junior (District) Football League in 1934 were Green Park (which won the premiership), Adelphians, Horsham CYMS, Church of England, Longerenong, Pimpinio Reserves and Quantong. In 1935 the competition name was referred to as the Horsham District Football League, with the term "junior" meaning a "minor" league back in the 1930s.

In 1944, the Horsham Junior Football Association was formed from the following clubs – Homing Club, Horsham Seniors, Horsham YCW, Kalkee, Laharum, Longerenong College and Wail, with Horsham YCW winning the premiership, with Wail winning the flag in 1945.

The clubs that played in 1946 Horsham District Junior Football League were Kalkee (which won the premiership), Horsham Homers, Horsham RSL, Horsham YCW, Jung, Laharum, Longerenong College, Taylors Lake, Wail and Wonwondah.

In 1982 the league expanded after the West Wimmera Football League disbanded and five clubs joined: Goroke, Noradjuha, Douglas-Harrow-Miga Lake, Gerang – Kiata, and Netherby-Lorquon. This brought the total to sixteen clubs. Since then some of these West Wimmera club's have either merged, folded or have gone into recess, and Imperials-Wonwondah moved to the Wimmera Football League in 1983.

In 1986 netball was introduced with Kalkee winning the first eight A grade premierships. Under 16 football commenced in 1998 with the demise of the Horsham District Junior Football League which included clubs from the HDFL and WFL. Under 13s was included the next year but the grades changed to under 17 in 2006 and under 14 in 2007.

In 2000, after the folding of the Ararat & District Football Association, Stawell Swifts and Great Western joined the competition.

Edenhope-Apsley joined from the Kowree Naracoorte Tatiara Football League in 2007. Natimuk and Horsham Diggers (Wimmera Football League) voted on a merger for 2014 season and beyond under the banner of Natimuk United Football Netball Club. The club wore the Natimuk jumper for home games and Horsham Diggers jumper for away games. They kept scheduling a match on Anzac Day.

Swifts were premiers in 2014 after defeating the previously undefeated Laharum in the grand final.

Laharum defeated Kalkee in the 2015 grand final.

Jeparit-Rainbow transferred from the Mallee Football League for the 2015 season. This caused the Mallee League to fold at the end of the 2015 season.

Consequently, Hopetoun and Beulah merged to form the Southern Mallee Giants and transferred to the Horsham & District League in 2016. They dominated the competition for two seasons without losing a game before transferring to the Wimmera Football League.

The league did not play any games in 2020 due to Victorian restrictions for the COVID-19. Kaniva-Leeor United joined the Horsham & District League in 2020 from the Kowree-Naracoorte-Tatiara League, as state border restrictions made it difficult for Kaniva, a Victorian club, to play in the South Australian league.

12 home and away matches were played in 2021, with the last match on 14 August 2021; however, there were no finals due to the COVID-19 lockdowns in August 2021.

Jeparit Rainbow left the league at the end of 2023 after merging with the Southern Mallee Giants in the Wimmera Football Netball League, leaving the Horsham & District League with 11 clubs.

== Clubs ==
=== Locations ===
Locations of the 2025 Horsham & District FL clubs. The orange pogs represent Harrow Balmoral FNC, which has multiple home grounds in Harrow and Balmoral.

=== Current ===
Club	Colours	Nickname	Home Ground	Former League	Est.	Years in comp	HDFNL Senior Premierships	
Club	Colours	Nickname	Home Ground	Former League	Est.	Years in comp	Total	Years
Edenhope-Apsley		Saints	Edenhope Showgrounds, Edenhope	KNTFL	1999	2007–	0	–
Harrow Balmoral		Kangaroos	Harrow & District Recreation Reserve, Harrow and Balmoral Recreation Reserve, Balmoral	–	1997	1997–	9	1999, 2002, 2004, 2007, 2018, 2019, 2023, 2024, 2025
Kalkee		Kees	Kalkee Recreation Reserve, Kalkee	CWFL	1890	1945–1948, 1954–1958, 1960–	15	1946, 1947, 1948, 1974, 1978, 1979, 1982, 1983, 1989, 2000, 2008, 2009, 2010, 2011, 2012
Kaniva Leeor United		Cougars	Kaniva Recreation Reserve, Kaniva	KNTFL	1996	2020–	0	–
Laharum		Demons, Mountain Men	Cameron Oval, Laharum	CWFL	1923	1936–	11	1938, 1958, 1959, 1962, 1963, 1964, 1987, 1995, 2013, 2015, 2026
Natimuk United		Rams	Natimuk Showgrounds, Natimuk	–	2014	2014–	0	–
Noradjuha-Quantong		Bombers	Quantong Recreation Reserve, Quantong	–	1997	1997–	0	–
Pimpinio		Tigers	Pimpinio Sporting Complex, Pimpinio	CWFL	1909	1968–	2	2005, 2006
Rupanyup		Panthers	Rupanyup Recreation Reserve, Rupanyup	WFNL	1870s	1981–	8	1985, 1986, 1990, 1996, 1997, 1998, 2001, 2022
Swifts		Baggies	North Park, Stawell	ADFA	1913	2000–	2	2003, 2014
Taylors Lake		Lakers	Dock Lake Recreation Reserve, Drung	–	1946	1946–	1	1952

=== Past Clubs ===
Club	Colours	Nickname	Home Ground	Former League	Est.	Years in comp	HDFNL Senior Premierships		Fate
Club	Colours	Nickname	Home Ground	Former League	Est.	Years in comp	Total	Years	Fate
Adelphians				HJFA	c.1930s	1936	0	–	Folded
Ararat Eagles		Eagles	Alexandra Oval, Ararat	–	2000	2000	0	–	Moved to Lexton Plains FL in 2001
Armoured Car				–	1939	1939	0	–	Folded when HDFL went into recess during WWII
Cannum			Cannum Recreation Ground, Cannum	LSFA	c.1880s	1969–1970	0	–	Folded in 1971
Dimboola 2nds		Roos	Dimboola Recreation Reserve, Dimboola	DDFA	1880s	1936–1937	1	1937	Moved to Central Wimmera FL in 1938
Douglas-Harrow-Miga Lake		Cats	Harrow Recreation Reserve, Harrow and Wombelano Recreation Reserve Wombelano	WWFL	1970	1982–1996	0	–	Merged with Balmoral in 1997 to form Harrow Balmoral
Gerang-Kiata	(1982-90s)(Late 90s)	Highway Men	Kiata Recreation Reserve, Kiata	WWFL	1962	1982–1999	0	–	Folded in 2000
Goroke		Magpies	Goroke Recreation Reserve, Goroke	WWFL	c.1890s	1982–1998	0	–	Folded in 1999 and absorbed by Border Districts in Kowree-Naracoorte-Tatiara FL
Great Western		Lions	Great Western Recreation Reserve, Great Western	ADFA	1880s	2000–2010	0	–	Recess in 2011, re-formed in Mininera & District FL in 2012
Green Park		Tigers		HJFA	c.1890s	1936–1938	2	1934, 1936	Folded
Haven	(1939)(1948–55)	Tigers	Haven Recreation Reserve, Haven	HJFA	c.1920s	1939, 1948–1955	1	1939	Folded in 1956
Homers (Homing Club 1945-50s, North Horsham 1998)		Pigeons	Oatlands Park, Horsham	–	1945	1945–1998	2	1965, 1992	Folded in 1999
Horsham RSL		Diggers		–	1945	1946–1961	0	–	Folded in 1962
Horsham Imperials		Tigers	Horsham City Oval, Horsham	–	c.1890s	1962–1975	1	1966	Merged with Wonwondah in 1976 to form Imperials-Wonwondah
Imperials–Wonwondah		Diggers	Horsham City Oval, Horsham	–	1976	1976–1982	1	1980	Moved to Wimmera FL in 1983
Jeparit Rainbow		Storm	Sir Robert Menzies Park, Jeparit and Rainbow Recreation Reserve, Rainbow	MFL	1996	2015–2023	0	–	Merged with Southern Mallee Giants to form Southern Mallee Thunder in the Wimmera FL in 2024
Jung			Jung Recreation Reserve, Jung	–	c.1890s	1946–1973	2	1954, 1968	Folded in 1974
Longerenong College		The College	Longerenong College, Longerenong	HJFA	c.1900s	1945–1986	4	1951, 1967, 1970, 1971	Folded in 1987
Murtoa Seconds		Magpies	Murtoa Recreation Reserve, Murtoa	DFL	1880s	1938, 1948	0		Moved to Central Wimmera FL in 1939, returned to South Wimmera FL in 1949
Natimuk		Rams	Natimuk Showgrounds, Natimuk	[[West Wimmera Football League|WWFL]]	c.1900s	1973–2014	1	1975	Merged with Horsham United in 2014 to form Natimuk United
Netherby-Lorquon		Saints	Netherby Memorial Park, Netherby	WWFL	1962	1982	0	–	Folded in 1983
Noradjuha		Grass Parrots	Noradjuha Recreation Reserve, Noradjuha	WWFL	c.1900s	1982–1996	1	1984	Merged with Quantong in 1997 to form Noradjuha-Quantong
Quantong		Bombers	Quantong Recreation Reserve, Quantong	CWFL	c.1910s	1950–1996	10	1955, 1956, 1960, 1961, 1972, 1973, 1976, 1977, 1993, 1994	Merged with Noradjuha in 1997 to form Noradjuha-Quantong
Southern Mallee Giants		Giants	Beulah Memorial Park, Beulah and Hopetoun Recreation Reserve, Hopetoun	–	2016	2016–2017	2	2016, 2017	Moved to Wimmera FL in 2018
St Michael's (Horsham YCW 1945–46)		Saints	Coughlin Park, Horsham	–	1945	1945–1954, 1957–1962, 1967–1992	5	1950, 1969, 1981, 1988, 1991	Moved to Wimmera FL in 1993, now known as Horsham Saints
Wail				DDFA	c.1920s	1945–1948	1	1945	Folded in 1949
Wonwondah		Magpies	Wonwondah Recreation Reserve, Wonwondah	CWFL	c.1920s	1946–1975	3	1949, 1953, 1957	Merged with Horsham Imperials in 1976 to form Imperials-Wonwondah

== Football Premiership Winners ==
=== Seniors ===
- 1934 Green Park d Horsham CYMS
- 1935 Adelphians d Green Park
- 1936 Green Park d Quantong
- 1937 Dimboola Seconds d Laharum
- 1938 Laharum d Murtoa 2nds
- 1939 Haven d Armoured Car
- 1940–43 in recess > World War II
- 1944 Horsham YCW d Homing
- 1945 Wail d Homing
- 1946 Kalkee d Homing
- 1947 Kalkee d Wonwondah
- 1948 Kalkee d Horsham RSL
- 1949 Wonwondah d Longerenong
- 1950 St Michaels d Jung
- 1951 Longerenong d St Michael's
- 1952 Taylors Lake d Jung
- 1953 Wonwondah d Laharum
- 1954 Jung d Quantong
- 1955 Quantong d Homers
- 1956 Quantong d Homers
- 1957 Wonwondah d Homers
- 1958 Laharum d Wonwondah
- 1959 Laharum d Quantong
- 1960 Quantong d Wonwondah
- 1961 Quantong drew Homers
- 1961 Quantong d Homers (Replay)
- 1962 Laharum d Homers
- 1963 Laharum d Quantong
- 1964 Laharum d Quantong
- 1965 Homers d Jung
- 1966 Imperials d Longerenong
- 1967 Longerenong d Imperials
- 1968 Jung d Longerenong
- 1969 St Michaels d Longerenong
- 1970 Longerenong d St Michael's
- 1971 Longerenong d Imperials
- 1972 Quantong d Imperials
- 1973 Quantong d Natimuk
- 1974 Kalkee d Natimuk
- 1975 Natimuk d Quantong
- 1976 Quantong d Homers
- 1977 Quantong d Kalkee
- 1978 Kalkee d Laharum
- 1979 Kalkee d Quantong
- 1980 Imperials-Wonwondah d St Michael's
- 1981 St Michaels d Natimuk
- 1982 Kalkee d Pimpinio
- 1983 Kalkee d Noradjuha
- 1984 Noradjuha d St. Michaels
- 1985 Rupanyup d Noradjuha
- 1986 Rupanyup d Laharum
- 1987 Laharum d Homers
- 1988 St Michaels d Homers
- 1989 Kalkee drew St Michael's
- 1989 Kalkee d St Michael's
- 1990 Rupanyup d Quantong
- 1991 St Michaels d Quantong
- 1992 Homers d Kalkee
- 1993 Quantong d Kalkee
- 1994 Quantong d Rupanyup
- 1995 Laharum d Natimuk
- 1996 Rupanyup d Natimuk
- 1997 Rupanyup d Goroke
- 1998 Rupanyup d Kalkee
- 1999 Harrow Balmoral d Kalkee
- 2000 Kalkee d Rupanyup
- 2001 Rupanyup d Kalkee
- 2002 Harrow Balmoral d Rupanyup
- 2003 Stawell Swifts d Harrow Balmoral
- 2004 Harrow Balmoral d Laharum
- 2005 Pimpinio d Laharum
- 2006 Pimpinio d Harrow Balmoral
- 2007 Harrow Balmoral d Kalkee
- 2008 Kalkee d Laharum
- 2009 Kalkee d Harrow Balmora
- 2010 Kalkee d Harrow Balmoral
- 2011 Kalkee d Harrow Balmoral
- 2012 Kalkee d Edenhope Aspley
- 2013 Laharum d Kalkee
- 2014 Swifts d Laharum
- 2015 Laharum d Kalkee
- 2016 Southern Mallee Giants d Harrow Balmoral
- 2017 Southern Mallee Giants d Harrow Balmoral
- 2018 Harrow Balmoral d Kalkee
- 2019 Harrow Balmoral d Noradjuha-Quantong
- 2020 In recess > COVID-19
- 2021 1st: Noradjuha Quantong 2nd: Rupanyup. No finals>COVID-19
- 2022 Rupanyup d Kalkee
- 2023 Harrow Balmoral d Jeparit-Rainbow
- 2024 Harrow Balmoral d Noradjuha Quantong
- 2025 Harrow Balmoral d Noradjuha Quantong
- 2026 Laharum d Noradjuha Quantong

=== Reserves ===
- 1974: Homers d Kalkee
- 1975: Homers d Natimuk
- 1976: Kalkee d Homers
- 1977: Kalkee d St Michael's
- 1978: Kalkee d Pimpinio
- 1979: Pimpinio d Kalkee
- 1980: Taylor's Lake d Pimpinio
- 1981: Rupanyup d Homers
- 1982: Rupanyup d St Michael's
- 1983: St Michael's d Rupanyup
- 1984: Rupanyup d St Michael's
- 1985: Rupanyup d Laharum
- 1986: Rupanyap d Goroke
- 1987: Homers d Kalkee
- 1988: Taylors Lake d Homers
- 1989: St Michael's d Kalkee
- 1990: St Michael's d Rupanyup
- 1991: Quantong d St Michael's
- 1992: Kalkee d Laharum
- 1993: Kalkee d Laharum
- 1994: Kalkee d Homers
- 1995: Kalkee d Natimuk
- 1996: Kalkee d Homers
- 1997: Kalkee d Noradjuha Quantong
- 1998: Kalkee d Natimuk
- 1999: Kalkee d Harrow Balmoral
- 2000: Kalkee d Noradjuha Quantong
- 2001: Kalkee d Stawell Swifts
- 2002: Stawell Swifts d Harrow Balmoral
- 2003: Stawell Swifts d Kalkee
- 2004: Stawell Swifts d Harrow Balmoral
- 2005: Laharum d Pimpinio
- 2006: Kalkee d Pimpinio
- 2007: Laharum d Kalkee
- 2008: Kalkee d Pimpinio
- 2009: Rupanyup d Kalkee
- 2010: Kalkee d Rupanyup. No scores (H&DFNL website)
- 2011: Noradjuha Quantong d Taylors Lake. No scores (H&DFNL website)
- 2012: Rupanyup d Edenhope Aspley. No scores (H&DFNL website)
- 2013: Kalkee d Edenhope Aspley
- 2014: Harrow Balmoral d Kalkee
- 2015: Kalkee d Harrow Balmoral
- 2016: Taylors Lake d Sthn Mallee Giants
- 2017: Sthn Mallee Giants d Edenhope Aspley
- 2018: Jeparit Rainbow d Harrow Balmoral
- 2019: Harrow Balmoral d Natimuk United
- 2020: In recess > COVID-19
- 2021: 1st: Noradjuha Quantong 2nd: Kalkee. No finals > COVID-19
- 2022: Noradjuha Quantong d Runpanyup
- 2023: Noradjuha Quantong d Harrow Balmoral
- 2024: Laharum d Noradjuha Quantong
- 2025: Noradjuha Quantong d Pimpinio
- 2026: Noradjuha Quantong d Pimpinio

=== Thirds ===
Under 16's

- 1998: Pimpinio d Goroke
- 1999: Laharum d Kalkee
- 2000: Stawell Swifts d Noradjuha Quantong
- 2001: Stawell d Kalkee
- 2002: Laharum d Kalkee
- 2003: Harrow Balmoral d Noradjuha Quantong
- 2004: Harrow Balmoral d Kelkee
- 2005: Laharum d Stawell Swifts

Under 17's

- 2006: Kalkee d Laharum
- 2007: Kalkee d Laharum
- 2008: Harrow Balmoral d Laharum
- 2009: Edenhope Aspley d Kalkee
- 2010: Kalkee d Edenhope Aspley
- 2011: Kalkee d Pimpinio
- 2012: Laharum d Kalkee
- 2013: Laharum d Stawell Swifts
- 2014: Edenhope Aspley d Laharum
- 2015: Noradjuha Quantong d Stawell Swifts
- 2016: Noradjuha Quantong d Edenhope Aspley
- 2017: Stawell Swifts d Noradjuha Quantong
- 2018: Harrow Balmoral d Laharum
- 2019: Noradjuha Quantong d Pimpinio
- 2020: H&DFNL in recess > COVID-19
- 2021: 1st: Stawell Swifts 2nd: Pimpinio
- 2022: Pimpinio d Kalkee
- 2023: Pimpinio d Natimuk United
- 2024: Pimpinio d Laharum
- 2025: Pimpinio d Kanina Leeor Edenhope Aspley
- 2026: Kalkee d Kanina Leeor Edenhope Aspley

=== Fourths ===
Under 13's

- 1999: Laharum d Pimpinio
- 2000: Noradjuha Quantong d Laharum
- 2001: Kalkee d Laharum
- 2002: Laharum d Harrow Balmoral
- 2003: Kalkee d Rupanyup
- 2004: Kalkee d Harrow Balmoral
- 2005: Laharum d Harrow Balmoral
- 2006: Harrow Balmoral d Noradjuha Quantong

Under 14's

- 2007: Noradjuha Quantong d Harrow Balmoral
- 2008: Kalkee d Noradjuha Quantong
- 2009: Kalkee d Noradjuha Quantong
- 2010: Laharum d Stawell Swifts
- 2011: Edenhope Aspley d ?
- 2012: Noradjuha Quantong d ?
- 2013: Noradjuha Quantong d Stawell Swifts
- 2014: Stawell Swifts d Edehope Aspley
- 2015: Harrow Balmoral d Stawell Swifts
- 2016: Kalkee d Noradjuha Quantong
- 2017: Pimpinio d Taylors Lake
- 2018: Taylors Lake d Stawell Swifts
- 2019: Stawell Swifts d Taylors Lake
- 2020: H&DFNL in recess > COVID 19
- 2021: 1st: Rupanyup 2nd: Laharum
- 2022: Laharum d Kanina Leeor United
- 2023: Noradjuha Quantong d Kanina Leeor United
- 2024: Edenhope Aspley d Noradjuha Quantong
- 2025: Noradjuha Quantong d Taylors Lake / Rupanyup
- 2026: Noradjuha Quantong d Laharum

== League Best and Fairest Awards ==
=== Senior Football ===
The current name for the senior football best and fairest medal is known as the Dellar Family Medal, which has been awarded since 19??.

Year	Horsham & DFNL Best & Fairest	Club	Votes
1938	Tom Fox	Green Park	10
1939	?		
1940–44	In recess >	World War II	
1945	?		
1946	?		
1947	George Beddison	Wail	26
1948	Clyde Biggins	St Michaels	25
Horsham DFL: Stan Freeland Medal
1949	John Gill	Longerenong College	20
1950	John Gill	Longerenong College	23
Horsham DFL: R Whiteside Trophy
1951	Don "Tich" Thompson	Horsham RSL	26
1951	Bill Smith	Homers	26
1952	Don "Tich" Thompson	Horsham RSL	18
1953	Perc Eagles	Haven	
Horsham DFL: Ari Matthews Trophy
1954	Ken Overall	Quantong	
1955	Don Matthews	Wonwondah	
1956	Jim Bearham	Longerenong College	
1957	Jim Bearham	Longerenong College	
1958	Ross Minchen	Longerenong College	
1959	Royce Dickson	Wonwondah	
1959	Brian Dunn	Laharum	
1960	Richard Reid	Longerenong College	
1961	Gary Epstein	Kalkee	
1962	Pat Irwin	Quantong	
1963	Mal Florence	Longerenong College	
1964	Bruce Martin	Homers	
1965	Stewart Bennett	Longerenong College	
1966	Bruce Martin	Homers	
1967	Rod Morrish	Longerenong College	
1968	Bruce Martin	Homers	
1969	Bob Dowdell	Laharum	
1970	Laurie Bodey	Imperials	
1971	Kevin Smith	Natimuk	
1972	Phil Morley	Longerenong College	
1973	Franz Tursi	Longerenong College	
1974	Graeme Wood	Quantong	
1975	Steve Arnott	Quantong	
1976	Larry Lawless	St Michaels	
1977	Ron Ward	Laharum	
1978	Bruce Carr	Kalkee	
1979	Bruce Carr	Kalkee	
1980	Bruce Carr	Kalkee	
1981	Jack Schmidt	Natimuk	
1982	Ian Kyte	Pimpinio	
1983	Craig Kimberley	Taylors Lake	
1984	Stephen Hobbs	Noradjuha	
1985	Chris Buwalda	St Michaels	
1986	Paul Block	Goroke	
1987	Les Wills	DHML	
1988	Chris Buwalda	St Michaels	
1989	Tony Lloyd	Goroke	
1990	Craig Evans	Rupanyup	
1991	Stephen Hobbs	Noradjuha	
1992	Trevor Whitworth	Goroke	
1992	Mark O'Beirne	St Michaels	
1993	Stephen Hobbs	Noradjuha	
1994	Craig Evans	Rupanyup	
1995	John Kelly	Taylors Lake	
1996	Wayne Schmidt	Natimuk	
1996	Paul Brooks	Rupanyup	
1997	Troy O'Callaghan	Harrow Balmoral	
1998	Paul Brooks	Rupanyup	
1999	Stewart Dalziel	Laharum	
1999	Scott Batchelor	Kalkee	
2000	Scott Batchelor	Kalkee	
2001	Scott Batchelor	Kalkee	
2001	Wayne Schmidt	Natimuk	
2002	Marcus Anson	Noradjuha/Quantong	
2002	Scott Bachelor	Kalkee	
2002	Jarrod Wood	Rupanyup	
2003	Chris White	Harrow Balmoral	
2004	Tim Webb	Rupanyup	
2005	Tim Webb	Rupanyup	
2006	Dale Hurley	Great Western	
2007	Matthew Ward	Harrow Balmoral	
2008	Steve Schultz	Kalkee	
2009	Steve Schultz	Kalkee	
2010	Steve Schultz	Kalkee	
2011	Tim Wade	Kalkee	
2012	Ricky Whitehead	Swifts	
2013	Brent Christie	Edenhope Apsley	29
2013	Brent Forsyth	Harrow Balmoral	29
2014	Deek Roberts	Taylors Lake	23
2014	Brent Christie	Edenhope Apsley	23
2015	Deek Roberts	Taylors Lake	23
2016	Shannon Argall	Laharum	27
2017	Scott Carey	Swifts	31
2018	Nick Pekin	Harrow Balmoral	19
2019	Nick Pekin	Harrow Balmoral	19
2019	Lachlan Middleton	Edenhope Apsley	19
2019	Jak Ryan	Edenhope Apsley	19
2020	In recess >	COVID-19	N/A
2021	Scott Carey	Swifts	18
2022	Scott Carey	Swifts	22
2023	Mitchell Gleeson	Rupanyup	28
2024	Jai Thompson	Harrow Balmoral	23
2025	Matthew Rosier	Pimpinio	18
2025	Jai Thompson *	Harrow Balmoral	(27)
2026	Declan Phyland	Noradjuha Quantong	23
Year	League Best & Fairest	Club	Votes

*2025 – Jai Thompson polled the most votes (27), but was deemed ineligible due to a round one guilty plea and accepted reprimand.

=== Reserves Football ===
The winner of the Horsham & DFNL Reserves football best and fairest award has received the Richie Dunlop Memorial Medal since ?. Richie passed away in the year 2000.

Year	Horsham & DFNL Best & Fairest	Club	Votes
1974	1974 to 2008: ?		
2009	Damian Kilpatrick	Natimuk	
2010	Kyal Murray & Blair Thomas	Taylors Lake; Kalkee	
2011	Shane Grigg	Edenhope Aspley	
2012	Craig Tuner	Rupanyup	
2013	Shane Grigg	Edenhope Aspley	20
2014	Edward Ferguson	Harrow Balmoral	19
2015	Damian Van Someren	Harrow Balmoral	17
2016	Lochie Bull	Noradjuha Quantong	21
2017	Dylan Baker	Pimpinio	29
2018	Ben Deutscher	Harrow Balmoral	25
2019	Jordan McDonald	Noradjuha Quantong	20
2020	H&DFNL in recess >	COVID-19	
2021	Adam Leslie	Stawell Swifts	16
2022	Andrew Baker; Matt Mutch; Quentin Wilmot	Stawell Swifts; Harrow Balmoral; Harrow Balmoral	16
2023	Matthew Tober	Stawell Swifts	22
2024	Matthew Tober; Colby Wilde*	Stawell Swifts	16; 15
2025	Cameron Domaschenz	Edenhope Aspley	19
2026	Jono Lovel	Natimuk United	27
2027			

- - * In 2024, due to a number of forfeits in the H&DFNL Reserves competition, the votes were averaged out per games.

=== Thirds Football ===
- Under 16's: 1998 to 2005
- Under 17's: 2006 to 2026

Year	Horsham & DFNL Best & Fairest	Club	Votes
1998	1998 to 2008 ?		
1999			
2000			
2001			
2002			
2003			
2004			
2005			
2006			
2007			
2008			
2009	Tom Easson	Laharum	
2010	Sam Carter	Kalkee	
2011	Fred Harrison	Laharum	
2012	Tim Carter	Noradjuha Quantong	
2013	Dustin Cross	Noradjuha Quantong	43
2014	Sam Ander; Alex Ridsdale	Kalkee; Natimuk United	?
2015	James Gregg	Noradjuha Quantong	?
2016	James Clever	Harrow Balmoral	22
2017	Dylan Bates; Josh Davis; Hamish McCrae	Pimpinio; Stawell Swifts; Harrow Balmoral	25
2018	Josh Reid	Stawell Swifts	33
2019	Tyler Hately; Jordon Motton	Harrow Balmoral; Kalkee	24
2020	H&DFNL in recess >	COVID-19	
2021	Connor Weidemann; Fred Frew	Rupanyup; Pimpinio	13
2022	Connor Weidemann	Rupanyup	34
2023	Fred Frew	Pimpinio	24
2024	Austin Simpson	Pimpinio	31
2025	Micah Erhardt	Noradjuha Quantong	30
2026	1st:Josh Taylor*	Natimuk United	15
	2nd: Patrick Price	Pimpinio	(16)
2027			

- 2026 - * Votes were averaged out per games played due to an uneven draw with uneven byes.

=== Fourths ===
Year	Horsham & DFNL Best & Fairest	Club	Votes
1998	1998 to 2008 ?		
2009	Daniel Bell	Noradjuha Quantong	
2010	Daniel Esson & Charlie Stewart	Laharum; Harrow Balmoral	
2011	Peter Staude	Harrow Balmoral	
2012	Kyle O'Connor; Hugo Papst; Ben Taylor	Natimuk; Noradjuha Quantong; Stawell Swifts	
2013	Oliver Timms	Kalkee	43
2014	Seth Blake	Stawell Swifts	
2015	Jakob Salmi	Stawell Swifts	
2016	Zach Kelly	Noradjuha Quantong	33
2017	Cody Helyar & Harry Miller	Pimpinio; Laharum	32
2018	Riley Hall	Taylors Lake	39
2019	Riley Hall	Taylors Lake	43
2020	H&DFNL in recess >	COVID-19	
2021	Ryley Munro & Monty Wynne	Edenhope Aspley; Laharum	30
2022	Riley Downer	Rupanyup	38
2023	Riley Downer	Rupanyup	44
2024	Chase Whelan	Laharum	37
2025	Judd Oakley	Noradjuha Quantong	29
2026	Angus Grute	Laharum	28
2027			

== Leading Goal Kicking Winners ==
=== Seniors ===
	Horsham DFNL: Senior Football Leading & Century Goalkickers				
Year	Winner	Club	Season Goals	Goals in finals	Total Goals
1934	to 2008 ?				
1992	Geoff Parish	Homers			170
1998	Paul Morgan	Rupanyup			170
2009	Steven Schultz	Kalkee	57		57
2010	James Staude	Harrow Balmoral	64	5	69
2011	James Staude	Harrow Balmoral	57	6	63
2012	Joshua Beddison	Kalkee	86	9	95
2013	Shannon Argall	Laharum	106	19	125
2014	Ben Martin	Swifts	60	2	62
2015	Jason Przibilla	Laharum	79	5	84
2016	Ashley Clugston	Laharum	80	3	83
2017	Kain Robins	Sth Mallee Giants	111	6	117
2018	Jayden Kuhne	Kalkee	64		64
2019	Peter Weir	Jeparit-Rainbow	67		67
2020	In recess >	COVID-19			
2021	Jack Musgrove	Rupanyup	55	N/A	55
2022	Jack Musgrove	Rupanyup	86	9	95
2023	Simon Close	Horrow Balmoral	80	4	84
2024	Paul Summers	Swifts	115	9	124
2025	Jacob Eats	Kaniva Leeor United	72	1	73
2026					

=== Reserves ===
	Horsham DFNL: Reserves Football Leading & Century Goalkickers				
Year	Winner	Club	Season Goals	Goals in finals	Total Goals
1974	to 2008 ?				
2009	Phillip Mills	Kalkee	79	10	89
2010	Marc Cook	Great Western	79	2	81
2011	Braydon Davis	Harrow Balmoral	46	5	51
2012	Neil Turner	Rupanyup	92	16	108
2013	Ben Anson	Noradjuha Quantong	69	n/a	69
2014	Tyler Bye &	Noradjuha Quantong	59	4	63
	Theo Zaxos	Edenhope Aspley	59	3	62
2015	Damian Van Someren	Harrow Balmoral	56	6	62
2016	Damian Van Someren	Harrow Balmoral	58	4	62
2017	James Staude	Harrow Balmoral	71	5	76
2018	Quentin Willmott	Harrow Balmoral	60	1	61
2019	Quentin Willmott	Harrow Balmoral	79	2	81
2020	In recess >	COVID-19			
2021	Shane Oakley	Noradjuha Quantong	70	n/a	70
2022	Quentin Willmott	Harrow Balmoral	57	5	62
2023	Quentin Willmott	Harrow Balmoral	88	6	94
2024	Adam Leslie	Stawell Swifts	96	1	97
2025	Tory Chapple	Noradjuha Quantong	64	6	70
2026	Dylan Baker	Pimpinio	70	10	80
2027					

=== Thirds ===
	Horsham DFNL: THIRDS Football Leading & Century Goalkickers				
Year	Winner	Club	Season Goals	Goals in finals	Total Goals
1998	to 2008 ?				
1999					
2000					
2001					
2002					
2003					
2004					
2005					
2006					
2007					
2008					
2009	Jayson Thompson	Laharum	65	6	71
	Shayne Williams	Edenhope Aspley	65	14	79
2010					
2011	Jake McConville	Kalkee	114	4	118
2012					
2013	George Walker	Edenhope Aspley	66	6	72
2014					
2015	Sam Raeck &	Stawell Swifts	36	3	39
	Jackson Welch	Pimpinio	36	5	41
2016					
2017	Briley Gould	Noradjuha Quantong	80	5	85
2018					
2019	Cooper Tyler	Laharum	35	7	42
2020	H&DFNL in recess >	COVID 19			
2021	Fred Frew	Pimpinio	37	n/a	37
2022					
2023	Austin Giusa	Stawell Swifts	102	2	104
2024					
2025	Marcus McIntyre	Kaniva Leeor United	45	19	64
2026	Jasper Beddison	Kalkee	33	11	44
2027					

=== Fourths ===
	Horsham DFNL: FOURTHS Football Leading & Century Goalkickers				
Year	Winner	Club	Season Goals	Goals in finals	Total Goals
2007	?				
2008	?				
2009	Damon Burns	Harrow Balmoral	38		38
	Oscar McDonald	Edenhope Aspley	38	1	39
	Tim Lawson	Kalkee	38		38
2010	Sam Jasper	Kalkee	38		38
2011	Ben Campbell	Edenhope Aspley	60	6	66
2012	Joe Harrison	Laharum	42	6	48
2013	Remy Cross	Noradjuha Quantong	42	8	50
2014	Jesse Lesse	Edenhope Aspley	43	2	45
2015	Matthew White	Kalkee	28	3	31
2016	Fraser Perkins	Kalkee	35	3	38
2017	Riley Hall	Taylors Lake	35	4	39
2018	Riley Hall	Taylors Lake	72	8	80
2019	Austin Giusa	Stawell Swifts	42	3	45
2020	H&DFNL in recess >	COVID 19			
2021	Austin Giusa	Stawell Swifts	58	n/a	58
2022	Riley Downer	Rupanyup	36	8	44
2023	Riley Downer	Rupanyup	65	8	73
2024	Chase Whelan	Laharum	49	7	56
2025	Max Borchard	Taylors Lake	58	2	60
2026	Peter Smith	Noradjuha Quantong	30	6	36
2027					

== Football Records ==
Seniors

Record	Holder
Highest Score	356: Homers 56.20 – 356 v Gerang-Kiata 1.0 – 6, 17 Aug 1991
Most goals in a game	25: Kevin Smith, Homers v College – 1965
Most goals in a season	170: Geoff Parish, Homers – 1992; Paul Morgan, Rupanyup – 1998
Most goals in a grand final	? :
Most flags in a row	5: Kalkee – 2008–2012
Most wins in a row	45: Kalkee – 2008–2010
Most losses in a row	46: Natimuk – 1999–2002

== VFL / AFL Players ==
The following footballers played in the Horsham DFL, prior to playing senior football in the VFL/AFL, and / or drafted, with the year indicating their VFL/AFL debut.

Edenhope-Apsley

- 2011 – Tom McDonald
- 2015 – Oscar McDonald

Harrow Balmoral

- 2008 – Tim Houlihan
- 2013 – Michael Close

Haven

- 1959 – Kevin Dellar

Horsham Homers

- 1969 – Bryan Pirouet
- 1977 – Shane Heard

Jung

- 1971 – Mike Delahunty

Kalkee

- 1994 – Shayne Breuer
- 2013 – Tanner Smith

Longerenong College

- 1951 – John Gill

Noradjuha

- 1972 – Peter Hickmott

Rupanyup

- 2006 – Matthew Tyler

== Netball ==
Horsham District FNL: Netball Premiership Table

	Horsham District FNL: Netball Premiership Table						
Year	A. Grade 1986 > present	B. Grade 1990 > present	C. Grade 1997 > present	C. Reserve 2014 > present	Under 16 1986 > present	Under 14 1990 > present	13 & Under 2004 > present
1986	Kalkee				Kalkee		
1987	Kalkee				Taylors Lake		
1988	Kalkee				Taylors Lake		
1989	Kalkee				Taylors Lake		
1990	Kalkee				St Michael's	St Michael's	
1991	Kalkee				St Michael's	St Michael's	
					Under 17		
1992	Kalkee				Quantong	Taylors Lake	
1993	Kalkee				Kalkee	Goroke	
1994	Taylors Lake				Natimuk	Goroke	
1995	Kalkee				Goroke	Pimpinio	
1996	Kalkee				Pimpinio	DHML	
1997	Harrow/Balmoral	Noradjuha Quantong	Kalkee		Taylors Lake	Laharum	
1998	Kalkee	Noradjuha Quantong	Kalkee		Pimpinio	Noradjuha Quantong	
1999	Harrow/Balmoral	Harrow/Balmoral	Noradjuha Quantong		Harrow/Balmoral	Noradjuha Quantong	
					17 & Under	15 & Under	
2000	Kalkee	Natimuk	Kalkee		Noradjuha Quantong	Noradjuha Quantong	
2001	Kalkee	Noradjuha Quantong	Kalkee		Noradjuha Quantong	Kalkee	
2002	Kalkee	Kalkee	Kalkee		Harrow/Balmoral	Rupanyup	
2003	Kalkee	Kalkee	Kalkee		Harrow/Balmoral	Kalkee	
2004	Kalkee	Kalkee	Noradjuha Quantong		Rupanyup	Noradjuha Quantong	Harrow/Balmoral
2005	Noradjuha Quantong	Kalkee	Noradjuha Quantong		Noradjuha Quantong	Noradjuha Quantong	Harrow/Balmoral
2006	Kalkee	Noradjuha Quantong	Noradjuha Quantong		Noradjuha Quantong	Kalkee	Harrow/Balmoral
2007	Kalkee	Noradjuha Quantong	Pimpinio		Noradjuha Quantong	Edenhope Aspley	Edenhope Aspley
2008	Noradjuha Quantong	Noradjuha Quantong	Noradjuha Quantong		Noradjuha Quantong	Edenhope Aspley	Laharum
2009	Kalkee	Edenhope Aspley	Noradjuha Quantong		Harrow Balmoral	Laharum	Kalkee
2010	Kalkee	Edenhope Aspley	Kalkee		Harrow Balmoral	Kalkee	Noradjuha Quantong
2011	Noradjuha Quantong	Noradjuha Quantong	Harrow Balmoral		Laharum	Noradjuha Quantong	Kalkee
2012	Noradjuha Quantong	Noradjuha Quantong	Harrow Balmoral		Noradjuha Quantong	Noradjuha Quantong	Kalkee
2013	Harrow Balmoral 31 d Edenhope Aspley 29	Noradjuha Quantong 25 d Edenhope Aspley 22	Harrow Balmoral 30 d Noradjuha Quantong 24		Edenhope Aspley 33 d Kalkee 29	Edenhope Aspley 34 d Kalkee 18	Edenhope Aspley 29 d Laharum 18
2014	Harrow Balmoral d Natimuk United	Noradjuha Quantong d Harrow Balmoral	Harrow Balmoral d Kelkee	Harrow Balmoral d Kelkee	Kalkee d Noradjuha Quantong	Kalkee d Noradjuha Quantong	Kalkee d Laharum
2015	Natimuk United 30 d Laharum 25	Noradjuha Quantong 18 d Edenhope Aspley 17	Edenhope Aspley ? d Noradjuha Quantong ?	Noradjuha Quantong ? d Harrow Balmoral ?	Kalkee 34 d Noradjuha Quantong 24	Edenhope Aspley 26 d Kalkee 16	Taylors Lake 21 d Edenhope Aspley 18
2016	Harrow Balmoral 59 d Noradjuha Quantong 37	Harrow Balmoral 33 d Natimuk United 29	Edenhope Aspley 29 d Noradjuha Quantong 26	Noradjuha Quantong 37 d Sth'n Mallee Giants 35	Kalkee 30 d Edenhope Aspley 25	Kalkee 33 d Sth'n Mallee Giants 32	Harrow Balmoral 25 d Kalkee 5
2017	Natimuk United 44 d Harrow Balmoral 41	Natimuk United 32 d Harrow Balmoralb18	Noradjuha Quantong 44 d Kalkee 36	Noradjuha Quantong 41 d Sth'n Mallee Giants 31	Laharum 41 d Harrow Balmoral 41	Taylors Lake 32 d Noradjuha Quantong 20	Kalkee 25 d Taylors Lake 12
2018	Natimuk United 38 d Laharum 33	Noradjuha Quantong 34 d Kalkee 26	Kalkee 41 d Natimuk United 16	Pimpinio 37 d Kalkee 24	Harrow Balmoral 21 d Natimuk United 17	Kalkee 25 d Taylors Lake 20	Pimpinio 23 d Kalkee 18
2019	Laharum 58 d Natimuk United 47	Noradjuha Quantong d Kalkee	Kalkee d Natimuk United	Noradjuha Quantong ? v Harrow Balmoral ?	Taylors Lake d Harrow Balmoral	Pimpinio d Taylors Lake	Pimpinio d Harrow Balmoral
2020	2020: Horsham DFNL cancelled due to the COVID-19 pandemic						
2021	Season abandoned after 12 matches. No finals series played due to COVID-19. 2021 Minor Premiers listed below.						
	1st:	1st:	1st:	1st:	1st:	1st:	1st:
2022	Edenhope Aspley 47 d Kaharum 45	Kalkee 29 d Noradjuha Quantong 18	Kalkee 39 d Edenhope Aspley 24	Noradjuha Quantong 31 d Kalkee 30	Pimpinio 49 d Harrow Balmoral 28	Kalkee 27 d Pimpinio 24	Kalkee 29 d Pimpinio 12
2023	Edenhope Aspley 53 d Laharum 43	Kalkee 26 d Natimuk United 25	Noradjuha Quantong 45 d Pimpinio 19	Edenhope Aspley 37 d Noradjuha Quantong 35	Pimpinio 40 d Kalkee 36	Kalkee 31 d Pimpinio 27	Pimpinio 20 d Harrow Balmoral 15
2024	Horsham* 40 d Laharum 38	Kalkee 30 d Natimuk United 28	Natimuk United 35 d Noradjuha Quantong 32	Kalkee 38 d Noradjuha Quantong 22	Pimpinio 43 d Kalkee 35	Rupanyup 48 d Kalkee 32	Kalkee 23 d Laharum 19
2025	Rupanyup 39 d Edenhope Aspley 37	Natimuk United* 39 d Noradjuha Quantong 30	Noradjuha Quantong 39 d Kalkee 37	Laharum 53 d Noradjuha Quantong 33	Kalkee 41 d Natimuk United 40	Laharum 41 d Pimpinio 29	Natimuk United 51 d Kalkee 50
2026	Edenhope Aspley 53 d Laharum 46	Harrow Balmoral 38 d Kalkee 37	Kalkee 40 d Natimuk United 37	Kalkee 43 d Laharum 27	Laharum 48 d Kalkee 35	Laharum 50 d Kalkee 36	Noradjuha Quantong 20 d Kalkee 17
2027							
Year	A. Grade	B. Grade	C. Grade	C. Reserve	17 & Under	15 & Under	13 & Under

== Netball Best and Fairest ==
Since 2023 the winner of the Horsham & DFNL - A. Grade best and fairest award receives the Michele Mibus Medal. Mibus was a former long-time Laharum netball player, coach, president, secretary and an H&DFNL official too. Mibus lost her battle with ovarian cancer in February 2016.

The winner of the Horsham & DFNL - B. Grade best and fairest award receives the Jennifer Kirchner Medal, who was involved with the Horsham & DFNL for 25 plus years and the Jennifer Kirchner Medal was first awarded in 2023.

Multiple A. Grade best and fairest wins

- 4 - Jo Hamdorf: Natimuk
- 3 - Ebonie Salter: Harrow Balmoral
- 2 - Zoe Heard: Noradjuha Quantong
- 2 - Emma Ryan: Edenhope Aspley
- 2 - Emily Burgess: Edenhope Aspley
- 2 - Brooke Pay: Noradjuha Quantong

=== Seniors Netball best and fairest winners ===
1986–2027: A, B, C and C. Reserve Grades

Horsham & District Football Netball League
Season	A-Grade (votes) 1986 to present	Club	B-Grade 1990 to present	Club	C-Grade 1997 to present	Club	C-Reserve 2014 to present	Club
1986								
1987								
1988								
1989								
1990	Tina Lannen	St. Michaels	Judy Kerr	Quantong				
1991	Tania Warrick	Gerang Kiata	Sharon Lawson	St Michaels				
1992	Janet Kimberley	Quantong	Jasmine Falla & Kerry Purdue	Rupanyup; Kalkee				
1993	Helen Copley	Taylors Lake	Kerry Purdue	Kalkee				
1994	Lousie Ryan	Laharum	Janelle Braune	DHML				
1995	Denise Hutchinson	Kalkee	Jodie Mulraney	DHML				
1996	Debbie Lawson	Kalkee	Penny Reynolds	Quantong				
1997	Melanie Youl	Harrow Balmoral	Simone Doolan	Kalkee	Kristy Tonkin	Kalkee		
1998	Natasha Perry	Natimuk	Claire McGennisken	Noradjuha Quantong	Kirsten Cunningham	Kalkee		
1999	Nano Melican	Harrow Balmoral	Michelle Lutze	Natimuk	Karin Ford	Natimuk		
2000	Melanie Scott	Harrow Balmoral	Janet Howie	Harrow Balmoral	Anne Russell	Harrow Balmoral		
2001	Penny Ashenden	Noradjuha Quantong	Michelle Bos & Leanna Cussons	Laharum; Noradjuha Quantong	Anne-Maree O'Bierne	Kalkee		
2002	Jo Hamdorf	Natimuk	Lisa Haby & Rachel Muszkieta	Pimpinio; Laharum	Karen Clarke	Harrow Balmoral		
2003	Jo Hamdorf & Penny Unger	Natimuk; Kalkee	Michelle Gebert	Laharum	Terri Cross	Natimuk		
2004	Jo Hamdorf	Natimuk	Sharon Hallam	Natimuk	Anne-Maree O'Bierne	Kalkee		
2005	Alex Emmett & Melissa Scott	Rupanyup; Pimpinio	Sharon Hallam	Natimuk	Trudi Schmidt	Kalkee		
2006	Michelle Trigg	Natimuk	Sharon Hallam	Natimuk	Amy Martin	Great Western		
2007	Jo Hamdorf	Natimuk	Elly Grellet; Tallie Talay	Stawell Swifts; Harrow Balmoral	Simone Brain	Kalkee		
2008	Zoe Heard	Noradjuha Quantong	Erica Blake	Natimuk	Wendy Ellis	Natimuk		
2009	Zoe Heard	Noradjuha Quantong	Erica Blake	Natimuk	Pauline Payne	Natimuk		
2010	Emma Ryan	Edenhope Aspley	Joanne Martin	Kalkee	Justine Crabtree	Noradjuha Quantong		
2011	Jo Taylor	Natimuk	Carly Creek; Cath McDonald	Noradjuha Quantong; Edenhope Aspley	Nibras Oakley	Noradjuha Quantong		
2012	Fiona Rowe	Noradjuha Quantong	Fiona Jasper	Kalkee	Lisa Kalms	Noradjuha Quantong		
2013	Ebonie Salter (42)	Harrow Balmoral	Rachel Pipkorn (29)	Noradjuha Quantong	Juanita Francis (21)	Noradjuha Quantong		
2014	Ebonie Salter (30)	Harrow Balmoral	Paige Cameron (20); Carly Creek (20); Alice Houlihan (20)	Harrow Balmoral; Noradjuha Quantong; Harrow Balmoral	Shana Miatke (22)	Kalkee	Emma Bigham (22)	Kalkee
2015	Emma Ryan (32)	Edenhope Aspley	Alexandra Downes (20)	Rupanyup	Kara Reinheimer (35)	Kalkee	Sherryn Simpson (27)	Harrow Balmoral
2016	Ebonie Salter (25) & Emma Uebergang (25)	Harrow Balmoral; Sthn Mallee Giants	Samantha Crick (27)	Harrow Balmoral	Jenna Wills (23)	Noradjuha Quantong	Amelia Scott (25)	Harrow Balmoral
2017	Caitlin Story (38)	Laharum	Rebecca Hudson	Kalkee	Kathryn Bowles (20); Chantelle Fisher (20); Lisa Fulton (20)	Harrow Balmoral; Jeparit Rainbow; Kalkee	Sherryn Simpson (27)	Harrow Balmoral
2018	Brooke Pay (26)	Noradjuha Quantong	Janelle Knight (26)	Harrow Balmoral	Jess Reinheimer (26)	Noradjuha Quantong	Maree Thompson (28)	Pimpinio
2019	Jenna Bywaters (29)	Kalkee	Melissa Beddison (23)	Kalkee	Porsha Jorgenson (21)	Noradjuha Quantong	Tania Crawford (22)	Stawell Swifts
2020 - Horsham & DFNL - In recess > COVID-19
2021 - Horsham & DFNL - 11 rounds completed. No finals series due to COVID-19.
2021	Olivia Jones (20)	Laharum	Kaleisha McKerron (16) & Eliza Jagger (16)	Taylors Lake; Harrow Balmoral	Lisa Fulton (16) & Louise Walton (16)	Kalkee; Stawell Swifts	Breanna Stonehouse (15)	Noradjuha Quantong
2022	Emily Burgess (25)	Edenhope Aspley	Jo Taylor (26)	Natimuk United	Holly Pepper (25)	Kaniva Leeor United	Tania Crawford (26)	Stawell Swifts
2023	Michele Mibus Medal		Jenny Kirchner Medal					
	Emily Burgess (33)	Edenhope Aspley	Abby Croft (22) & Jo Taylor (22)	Kaniva Leeor United; Natimuk United	Katrina Kerr (27)	Noradjuha Quantong	Bree Stonehouse (27)	Noradjuha Quantong
2024	Brooke Pay (25)	Noradjuha Quantong	Erin Freeland (26)	Stawell Swifts	Danielle Grindlay (29)	Edenhope Aspley	Sophie Pietsch (31)	Kalkee
2025	Lavinia Fox (29)	Edenhope Aspley	Jo Taylor (30)	Natimuk United	Abby Hepburn (20) & Sophie Reid (20)	Edenhope Aspley; Noradjuha Quantong	Charli Watts (28)	Laharum
2026	Leah Mirtschin (35)	Noradjuha Quantong	Maya Przibilla (32)	Laharum	Morgan Coventry (21) & Biance Kettle (21)	Laharum; Kalkee	Emma Bigham (22)	Kalkee
2027								
Season	A-Grade (votes)	Club	B-Grade	Club	C-Grade	Club	C-Reserve	Club

=== Junior Netball Best and Fairest Winners ===
1990 – 2027: Under 16's, 14's & 13's Grades

Horsham & District Football Netball League
Season	Under 16's (votes) 1990 to present	Club	Under 14's (votes) 1990 to present	Club	13 & Under (votes) 2004 to present	Club
1990	Leanne Hobbs	DHML	Katie Molloy & Kellie Benbow	Goroke; Taylors Lake		
1991	Leanne Hobbs	DHML	Fiona Mackley & Cassie Murdock	Natimuk; Taylors Lake		
	Under 17's		Under 15's			
1992	Kim Lehmann & Angie Wilksch	Quantong; Quantong	Deane Price	Quantong		
1993	Natalie Lienert	Gerang Kiata	Nerralea Wicks	Kalkee		
1994	Laura Jenkinson	Kalkee	Nerralea Wicks	Kalkee		
1995	Paula Duffy	Gerang Kiata	Bridget Officer	Noradjuha		
			15 & Under			
1996	Katrina Officer	Noradjuha	Bridget Officer	Noradjuha		
1997	Lauren Tagg	Taylors Lake	Bridget Officer	Noradjuha		
1998	Jenni Hurley	Rupanyup	Christy Hinch	Pimpinio		
1999	Jenni Hurley	Rupanyup	Zoe Heard	Noradjuha Quantong		
	17 & Under					
2000	Jenni Hurley	Rupanyup	Jessica Anson	Harrow Balmoral		
2001	Jenni Hurley	Rupanyup	Olivia Miller	Laharum		
2002	Tara Cadzow & Cassandra Hobbs	Great Western; Pimpinio	Alex Emmett & Emily Hateley	Rupanyup; Natimuk		
2003	Jessica Anson	Harrow Balmoral	Anna Brody; Olivia Hobbs	Harrow Balmoral; Kalkee		
2004	Brownyn Roberts	Laharum	Renee Stevenson	Natimuk	Katie Magee	Kalkee
2005	Spencer Smith	Kalkee	Breanna McPhee	Harrow Balmoral	Alysha Liston	Laharum
2006	Janye Anson & Katie Ralph	Noradjuha Quantong; Stawell Swifts	Shannon Reinheimer	Kalkee	Sabrina Hurley	Rupanyup
2007	Abbie Avery	Noradjuha Quantong	Emma Ryan	Edenhope Aspley	Sarah Jude	Edenhope Aspley
2008	Kelsey Hamilton	Pimpinio	Sabrina Hurley	Rupanyup	Courtney Price	Harrow Balmoral
2009	Abby Byrne	Edenhope Aspley	Emalee Iredell	Laharum	Maggie McFarlene	Kalkee
2010	Krystal Schapel	Edenhope Aspley	Maggie McFarlane	Kalkee	Georgia Bunworth	Taylors Lake
2011	Hayley McDonald	Noradjuha Quantong	Alex Lang	Edenhope Aspley	Olivia Matthews	Rupanyup
2012	Tayla Morgan	Rupanyup	Alex Lang	Edenhope Aspley	Maddison Focroul	Noradjuha Quantong
2013	Alex Lang (43)	Edenhope Aspley	Ellie Breuer (36)	Kalkee	Laetitia Lees (30)	Edenhope Aspley
2014	Stevie Bibby (37)	Kalkee	Maddison Focroul	Noradjuha Quantong	Mya Jones & Holly Smith	Kalkee; Natimuk United
2015	Maddison Focroul	Noradjuha Quantong	Jordie McAuliffe	Kalkee	Tahlia Duffy; Febey McClure	Kalkee; Harrow Balmoral
2016	Maddison Focroul (27)	Noradjuha Quantong	Kiana Marshamn (32)	Sth'n Mallee Giants	Kayla Kelm (29) & Gemma Sounness (29)	Taylors Lake; Kalkee
2017	Kiana Marshman (29)	Sth'n Mallee Giants	Denita Reid (27) & Mikayla Treacy (27)	Sth'n Mallee Giants; Noradjuha Quantong	Kayla Kelm (31)	Taylors Lake
2018	Darcy Crawford (24)	Stawell Swifts	Kayla Kelm (?)	Taylors Lake	Tahlia Thompson (39)	Pimpinio
2019	Mia McGrath (28)	Kalkee	Kayla Kelm (32)	Taylors Lake	Shekinah Hurlstone (36)	Jeparit Rainbow
2020 - Horsham & DFNL - In recess > COVID-19
2021 - Horsham & DFNL - 11 rounds completed. No finals series due to COVID-19.
2021	Tahlia Thompson (26)	Pimpinio	Adele Weidemann (24)	Runpanup	Isla Hiscock (25)	Noradjuha Quantong
2022	Tahlia Thompson (35)	Pimpinio	Adele Weidemann (37)	Rupanyup	Isla Hiscock (37)	Noradjuha Quantong
2023	Lilly Weir (30)	Taylors Lake	Mia Rees (27)	Harrow Balmoral	Ruby Williams (36)	Pimpinio
2024	Tara McIntyre (30)	Harrow Balmoral	Phoebe Downer (30)	Rupanyup	Gretel Blake (34)	Natimuk
2025	Abbey Williams (30)	Kalkee	Ruby Williams (39)	Pimpinio	Ane Van Zyl (26)	Rupanyup
2026	Ruby Williams (31)	Pimpinio	Ella Schultz (23)	Kalkee	Isla Brown (30)	Kalkee
2027						
Season	17 & Under (votes) 1990 to present	Club	15 & Under (votes) 1990 to present	Club	13 & Under (votes) 2004 to present	Club

== Senior Football Ladders ==
=== 2014 Ladder ===
Horsham DFL	Wins	Byes	Losses	Draws	style="color:crimson" |For	Against	%	Pts	Final	Team	G	B	Pts	Team	G	B	Pts
Laharum	18	0	0	0	2641	716	368.85%	72	Elimination	Edenhope-Apsley	10	6	66	Harrow Balmoral	7	20	62
Kalkee	14	0	4	0	2129	1057	201.42%	56	Qualifying	Kalkee	11	15	81	Stawell Swifts	8	8	56
Stawell Swifts	14	0	4	0	1943	1035	187.73%	56	Semi	Stawell Swifts	12	14	86	Edenhope-Apsley	12	7	79
Harrow Balmoral	13	0	5	0	1796	1207	148.80%	52	Semi	Laharum	19	14	128	Kalkee	9	9	63
Edenhope-Apsley	11	0	7	0	1713	1154	148.44%	44	Preliminary	Stawell Swifts	20	8	128	Kalkee	10	13	73
Noradjuha-Quantong	6	0	12	0	1437	1898	75.71%	24	Grand	Stawell Swifts	15	5	95	Laharum	10	6	66
Natimuk United	6	0	12	0	1304	1738	75.03%	24									
Taylors Lake	5	0	13	0	1411	2145	65.78%	20									
Rupanyup	3	0	15	0	994	2208	45.02%	12									
Pimpinio	0	0	18	0	644	2854	22.56%	0									

=== 2015 Ladder ===
Horsham DFL	Wins	Byes	Losses	Draws	For	Against	%	Pts	Final	Team	G	B	Pts	Team	G	B	Pts
Laharum	16	2	0	0	2517	588	428.06%	72	Elimination	Taylors Lake	8	7	55	Jeparit-Rainbow	5	12	42
Kalkee	14	2	2	0	2086	878	237.59%	64	Qualifying	Harrow Balmoral	12	20	92	Kalkee	11	5	71
Harrow Balmoral	11	2	5	0	1614	932	173.18%	52	Semi	Kalkee	16	16	112	Taylors Lake	14	11	95
Taylors Lake	10	2	6	0	1780	1245	142.97%	48	Semi	Laharum	17	16	118	Harrow Balmoral	4	8	32
Jeparit-Rainbow	10	2	6	0	1483	1235	120.08%	48	Preliminary	Kalkee	18	10	118	Harrow Balmoral	6	9	45
Stawell Swifts	7	2	9	0	1227	1840	66.68%	36	Grand	Laharum	14	14	98	Kalkee	7	8	50
Edenhope-Apsley	6	2	10	0	1023	1632	62.68%	32									
Noradjuha-Quantong	5	2	11	0	1018	1787	56.97%	28									
Rupanyup	4	2	12	0	766	1732	44.23%	24									
Pimpinio	3	2	13	0	839	1747	48.03%	20									
Natimuk United	2	2	14	0	891	1628	54.73%	16									

=== 2016 Ladder ===
Horsham DFL	Wins	Byes	Losses	Draws	For	Against	%	Pts	Final	Team	G	B	Pts	Team	G	B	Pts
Southern Mallee Giants	16	0	0	0	2317	809	286.40%	64	Elimination	Harrow Balmoral	11	11	77	Laharum	11	8	74
Jeparit-Rainbow	14	0	2	0	1987	988	201.11%	56	Elimination	Kalkee	9	5	59	Edenhope-Apsley	5	12	42
Laharum	12	0	4	0	1677	902	185.92%	48	Semi	Harrow Balmoral	12	14	86	Kalkee	10	8	68
Kalkee	11	0	5	0	2016	1031	195.54%	44	Semi	Southern Mallee Giants	22	15	147	Jeparit-Rainbow	8	7	55
Edenhope-Apsley	11	0	5	0	1815	1069	169.78%	44	Preliminary	Harrow Balmoral	11	13	79	Jeparit-Rainbow	4	10	34
Harrow Balmoral	10	0	6	0	1799	845	212.90%	40	Grand	Southern Mallee Giants	11	14	80	Harrow Balmoral	9	1	55
Taylors Lake	7	0	9	0	1687	1622	104.01%	28									
Stawell Swifts	5	0	11	0	1174	2022	58.06%	20									
Pimpinio	4	0	12	0	1045	2052	50.93%	16									
Noradjuha-Quantong	2	0	14	0	899	2105	42.71%	8									
Rupanyup	14	0	2	0	717	1917	37.40%	48									
Natimuk United	2	0	14	0	794	2565	30.96%	8									

=== 2017 Ladder ===
Horsham DFL	Wins	Byes	Losses	Draws	For	Against	%	Pts	Final	Team	G	B	Pts	Team	G	B	Pts
Southern Mallee Giants	16	0	0	0	2556	529	483.18%	64	Elimination	Stawell Swifts	7	14	56	Natimuk United	8	4	52
Harrow Balmoral	14	0	2	0	2653	478	555.02%	56	Elimination	Jeparit-Rainbow	12	15	87	Lahuarum	5	5	35
Stawell Swifts	13	0	3	0	1799	992	181.35%	52	Semi	Jeparit-Rainbow	10	11	71	Stawell Swifts	7	8	50
Jeparit-Rainbow	10	0	4	2	1514	955	158.53%	44	Semi	Southern Mallee Giants	13	8	86	Harrow Balmoral	7	15	57
Laharum	9	0	7	0	1470	1133	129.74%	36	Preliminary	Harrow Balmoral	29	13	187	Jeparit-Rainbow	5	8	38
Natimuk United	9	0	7	0	1450	1221	118.76%	36	Grand	Southern Mallee Giants	11	7	73	Harrow Balmoral	8	13	61
Edenhope-Apsley	7	0	8	1	1476	1212	121.78%	30									
Kalkee	6	0	10	0	1289	1580	81.58%	24									
Noradjuha-Quantong	5	0	11	0	993	1830	54.26%	20									
Rupanyup	4	0	12	0	1071	1613	66.40%	16									
Taylors Lake	1	0	15	0	554	3221	17.20%	4									
Pimpinio	0	0	15	1	451	2512	17.95%	2									
