= Syd Tate =

Australian rules footballer

Personal information
- Full name: Sydney Tate
- Born: 13 February 1925; England
- Died: 15 May 2015 (aged 90); Hamlyn Heights, Victoria
- Original team: Yallourn
- Height: 173 cm (5 ft 8 in)
- Weight: 75 kg (165 lb)

Playing career^{1}
Years	Club	Games (Goals)
1947–1951	Geelong	85 (13)
- ^{1} Playing statistics correct to the end of 1951.

Sydney "Spudda" Tate (13 February 1925 – 15 May 2015) was an Australian rules footballer who played for Geelong in the VFL.

Tate was a wingman in Geelong's 1951 premiership side, his last year in the league. He could also play as a rover and was originally from the Victorian town of Yallourn.
