= Keith McDonald (footballer) =

Australian rules footballer

Personal information
- Full name: Keith A. McDonald
- Born: 12 September 1929
- Died: 24 December 1990 (aged 61)
- Original team: Essendon District
- Height: 182 cm (6 ft 0 in)
- Weight: 79 kg (174 lb)

Playing career^{1}
Years	Club	Games (Goals)
1951–1952	Essendon	13 (9)
- ^{1} Playing statistics correct to the end of 1952.

Keith McDonald (12 September 1929 – 24 December 1990) was an Australian rules footballer who played with Essendon in the Victorian Football League (VFL).

Recruited locally, McDonald started out in the Essendon seconds and was a member of their premiership team in 1950. He made 12 senior appearances in the 1951 VFL season and during the finals series was Essendon's full-forward, as John Coleman was out suspended. He wasn't picked in the semi-final but had forced his way back into the side for the preliminary final after kicking five goals in the seconds. In the 1951 Grand Final, the absence of Coleman was costly, as McDonald could only manage two goals, in an 11-point loss.

McDonald played just one more game for Essendon, in the opening round of the 1952 season. He finished the year at Coburg Football Club, in the Victorian Football Association (VFA), where he remained for two further seasons. In the 1953 Adelaide Carnival, McDonald represented the VFA.
