= Ray Preston (Australian footballer) =

Australian rules footballer (1930–2015)

Personal information
- Full name: Rayner Noel Preston
- Born: 27 December 1930
- Died: 8 June 2015 (aged 84)
- Original teams: West Coburg, Ardmona, Silvan, City United
- Height: 170 cm (5 ft 7 in)
- Weight: 70 kg (154 lb)
- Position: rover

Playing career^{1}
Years	Club	Games (Goals)
1953	South Melbourne	7 (0)
- ^{1} Playing statistics correct to the end of 1953.

Rayner Noel Preston (27 December 1930 – 8 June 2015) was an Australian rules footballer who played with South Melbourne in the Victorian Football League (VFL).

Preston, who was originally from West Coburg and then played in Ardmona's 1947 Central Goulburn Valley Football League's premiership, kicking three goals in the grand final.

Preston then played with Silvan Football Club, where he won the 1948 Mountain District Football League best and fairest award. Preston then trained with Carlton in March/April 1949, before returning to Silvan.

Preston was then recruited to South Melbourne from Shepparton club, City United in the Goulburn Valley Football League after he won the club's 1952 best and fairest award.

Preston made his VFL debut in round two, 1953 against Essendon, playing a total of seven games in 1953, before being delisted in April, 1954.

Preston, (Wangaratta FC) won the 1955 Morris Medal in the Ovens & Murray Football League, with 22 votes, with Alby Rodda from Myrtleford, second on 20 votes. Preston was one of Wangaratta's best players in their 1955 grand final loss to North Albury, kicking three goals.

Preston won Wangaratta's 1955 and 1956 best and fairest award, before moving to Shepparton to play with Lemnos in 1957.

Preston later played with Seymour in the Waranga North East Football Association and was runner up in the 1959 W&NEFL best and fairest award and later on played with Mooroopna in 1961 and 1962.
