= Keith Macdonald =

Scotland international rugby union player (1933–2021)

Keith MacDonald
- Born: Keith Roy MacDonald; 13 May 1933
- Died: 20 September 2021 (aged 88) Elie, Fife, Scotland
- School: High School of Dundee

Rugby union career
International career
Years	Team	Apps	(Points)
- Scotland
–	Barbarians		

Keith Roy Macdonald (13 May 1933 – 20 September 2021) was a Scottish rugby union player who played for the Barbarians and represented the national team.

He attended the High School of Dundee.

Macdonald died on 20 September 2021, at the age of 88, in Elie, Fife.
