= Harry Caspar =

Australian rules footballer

Personal information
- Full name: Harry Caspar
- Born: 4 November 1926
- Died: 1 July 1988 (aged 61)
- Original team: Northcote
- Height: 185 cm (6 ft 1 in)
- Weight: 89 kg (196 lb)
- Position: Ruck / Defence

Playing career^{1}
Years	Club	Games (Goals)
1946–49	Northcote	(unknown)
1950–53, 1955	Carlton	58 (5)
1954,1957–60	Sorrento	54
- ^{1} Playing statistics correct to the end of 1955.

Career highlights
- 1953 Seconds premiership in Carlton Reserves

Harry Caspar (4 November 1926 – 1 July 1988) was an Australian rules footballer who played with Carlton in the Victorian Football League (VFL). Harry played five seasons at Sorrento, coaching in 1957–58 and received Life Membership.
