= Jung, Victoria =

Jung
- Town
- Coordinates: 36.6285313°S 142.3357039°E
- Country: Australia
- State: Victoria
- LGA: Rural City of Horsham
- Location: 13 km (8.1 mi) W of Murtoa; 18 km (11 mi) NE of Horsham; 316 km (196 mi) NW of Melbourne
- Established: 1877

Government
  - State electorate: Lowan
  - Federal division: Mallee
- Elevation: 144 m (472 ft)

Population
  - Total: 241 (2016 census)
- Postcode: 3401
- Mean max temp: 21.5 °C (70.7 °F)
- Mean min temp: 8.0 °C (46.4 °F)
- Annual rainfall: 409.3 mm (16.11 in)

Jung is a town in the northern Wimmera region, north-west Victoria. It is 316 km north-west of Melbourne and 18 km north-east of Horsham.

== History ==
The name is derived from the Parish Jung Jung, which comes from an Aboriginal expression of uncertain meaning.

It was previously known as Taylor’s Creek, Green Hills and Jerro.

Originally Jung was a settlement on the Yarriambiack Creek, 3 km north of its present location, until 1879 when it moved towards the newly built railway station on the line between Stawell and Horsham.

== Sport and recreation ==
The Jung Australian Rules Football Club was formed in 1890 and they initially played in the Jas Howard Trophy competition in 1890. In 1891, the club's jumper colours were navy blue with a cross sash of white and maroon and blue socks.

Jung FC later played in the Horsham District Football League from 1946 to 1973 and won two premierships in 1954 and 1968. The club folded prior to the 1974 football season.

Premiers

- Country Clubs Football Association (Sack Trophy)
  - 1902
  - 1903 - Jung: 1.7 - 13 d Kalkee
- Central Wimmera FA
  - 1919 - Jung: 5.5 - 35 d Pimpinio: 1.5 - 11
  - 1920 - Jung:
  - 1922 - Jung: 11.9 - 75 d Horsham 2nds: 4.8 - 32
  - 1923 - Jung: 7.9 - 51 d Horsham 2nds: 7.8 - 50
  - 1927 - Jung: 9.10 - 64 d Pimpinio: 9.8 - 62
- Horsham District Football League
  - 1954 - Jung: d Quantong:
  - 1968 - Jung: 12.9 - 81 d Longerenong: 9.14 - 68

== Links ==
- 1954 - Horsham District Football League Premiers: Jung FC team photo
