= Horsham Saints Football Club =

Horsham Saints FNC Inc.

Names
- Full name: Horsham Saints Football Netball Club
- Former name: Horsham YCW: 1944–1946; St. Michael's: 1947–99
- Nickname: Saints
- Motto: "Strength Through Loyalty"

2025 season
- Home-and-away season: 7th (6 wins/10 losses)
- Leading goalkicker: 24 – Mitch Martin
- Best and fairest: Mitch Martin

Club details
- Founded: 1944; 82 years ago
- Colours
- Competition: Wimmera Football League (WFL)
- President: Sally Ison
- Premierships: (7) 1950, 1969, 1981, 1988, 1991, 2015, 2016
- Ground: Coughlin Park, Horsham

Uniforms
Home

Other information
- Official website: Horsham Saints FNC

The Horsham Saints Football Netball Club is an Australian rules football and netball club based in the city of Horsham, Victoria. The football team competes in the Wimmera Football League (WFL).

== History ==
The Horsham Saints, formed in 1944, was known as the Young Christian Workers (YCWFC) and joined the Horsham & District Football League (HDFL).

In 1947 the club changed its name to St. Michael's, with the club winning five senior football premierships in the HDFL.

In 1993, the club moved to the Wimmera Football League, then in 2000 the club adopted its current name and have won two more senior football premierships since.

== Premierships ==
Senior Football

- Horsham District Patriotic Football Association
  - 1944 – Horsham CYW: 7.16 – 58 d Horsham Homing: 6.11 – 47
- Horsham & District Football League
  - 1950 – St. Michael's: 8.20 – 68 d Jung: 8.19 – 67
  - 1969 – St. Michael's: 20.12 – 132 d Longerenong Ag College: 12.11 – 83
  - 1981 – St. Michael's: 23.17 – 155 d Natimuk: 21.12 – 138
  - 1988 – St. Michael's: 11.8 – 74 d Homers: 3.10 – 28
  - 1991 – St. Michael's: d Quontong: by 6 points
- Wimmera Football League
  - 2015 – Horsham Saints: 16.6 – 102 d Horsham: 9.8 – 62
  - 2016 – Horsham Saints: 6.9 – 45 d Minyip-Murtoa: 6.7 – 43

Reserves

- Horsham & District Football League
  - 1983 – St. Michael's 7.9 – 51 d Rupanyup: 6.7 – 43
  - 1989 – St. Michael's d Kalkee
  - 1990 – St. Michael's d Rupanyup
- Wimmera Football League
  - 2017 – Horsham Saints: 11.9 – 75 d Minyip-Murtoa: 8.6 – 54
  - 2018 – Horsham Saints: 12.6 – 78 d Minyip-Murtoa: 2.10 – 24

Thirds

- Wimmera Football League
  - 2019 – Horsham Saints: 9.5 – 59 d Ararat: 5.2 – 32
  - 2021 – 1st: Horsham Saints (no finals >COVID-19)
  - 2025 – Horsham Saints: 19.11 – 125 d Horsham: 6.5 – 41

== League Best and Fairest ==
Senior Football

- Horsham & District Football League
  - 1948 – Clyde Biggins: 25 votes
  - 1976 – Larry Lawless
  - 1985, 1988 – Chris Buwalda
  - 1992 – Mark O'Beirne
- Wimmera Football League

== VFL / AFL Players ==
The following footballers played with the Horsham Saints, prior to playing senior football in the VFL/AFL, and / or drafted, with the year indicating their VFL/AFL debut.

- 2011 – Rory Taggert: Melbourne
- 2015 – Darcy Tucker: Fremantle
- 2016 – Jarrod Berry: Brisbane Lions
- 2018 – Tom Berry: Brisbane Lions
- 2023 – Joel Freijah: Western Bulldogs

== Netball Premierships ==
A. Grade

- Wimmera FNL
  - 2004, 2017, 2018

B. Grade

- Nil

C. Grade

- Wimmera FNL
  - 2016

C. Reserve

- Nil

Under 17's

- Wimmera FNL
  - 2002, 2003

Under 16's

- Horsham & District Football League
  - 1990, 1991

Under 15. A

- Wimmera FNL
  - 2015

Under 15's

- Wimmera FNL
  - 2000

Under 14's

- Horsham & District Football League
  - 1990, 1991

Under 13's

- Wimmera FNL
  - 2007, 2014, 2019
- Horsham City Netball Association
  - 2012 – City Saints Red
  - 20118 – Silver Saints

== Bibliography ==
- Wheatbelt Warriors. A Tribute To Wimmera Football League
