= John Gill (footballer, born 1932) =

Australian rules footballer (1932–2003)

Personal information
- Full name: John Somers Gill
- Born: 19 April 1932
- Died: 3 March 2003 (aged 70)
- Original teams: Longerenong College, Horsham DFL
- Height: 193 cm (6 ft 4 in)
- Weight: 95 kg (209 lb)
- Position: Ruckman

Playing career^{1}
Years	Club	Games (Goals)
1949–1950	Longerenong FC	? (?)
1951–1957	Essendon	107 (76)
- ^{1} Playing statistics correct to the end of 1957.

Career highlights
- Horsham DFL best & fairest: 1949, 1950; Essendon best & fairest: 1954; VFL Brownlow Medal: 1954 - 3rd; Victorian interstate representative 1954, 1955 & 1957; Sporting Globe VFL Team of the Year: 1954 & 55

John Somers Gill (19 April 1932 – 3 March 2003) was an Australian rules footballer who played with Essendon in the Victorian Football League (VFL) from 1951 to 1957.

Recruited from the Longerenong Agricultural College in the Horsham District Football League, where he won the 1949 and 1950 league best and fairest award. Gill also played in Longerenong Agricultural College's losing 1949 Horsham District Football League grand final loss to Wonwondah

Gill made his VFL debut, two days after his nineteenth birthday, for Essendon's seniors in the first home-and-away match of the 1951 season, on 21 April 1951, when Essendon defeated Melbourne 13.8 (86) to 10.16 (76) at Windy Hill.

In 1952, Gill was officially the second tallest player in the VFL, just half an inch shorter than his Essendon team mate, Geoff Leek.

He won the Crichton Medal in 1954, and finished third in that season's Brownlow Medal count.

He represented Victoria in 1954, 1955 and 1957.

Having missed the 1951 VFL grand final due to illness, he played in the 1957 VFL grand final, but was on the losing side. It turned out to be his last game of football as he retired at the age of just 25 to concentrate on his business career.
