= Bert Worner =

Australian rules footballer

Personal information
- Born: 18 September 1929
- Died: 2 September 2012 (aged 82); Geelong, Victoria
- Original team: Swan Hill
- Height: 178 cm (5 ft 10 in)
- Weight: 78 kg (172 lb)

Playing career^{1}
Years	Club	Games (Goals)
1951–1955	Geelong	65 (10)
- ^{1} Playing statistics correct to the end of 1955.

Allan Albert 'Bert' Worner (18 September 1929 – 2 September 2012) was an Australian rules footballer who played with Geelong in the VFL during the early 1950s.

Worner usually played on the half back flank but was also seen on the wing and in the centre. Recruited from Tyntynder, he was a premiership player in 1951 and 1952.
