= George Goninon =

Australian rules footballer (1927–2023)

Personal information
- Born: 18 April 1927
- Died: 7 December 2023 (aged 96)
- Original team: Burnie (NWFU)
- Height: 181 cm (5 ft 11 in)
- Weight: 79 kg (174 lb)

Playing career^{1}
Years	Club	Games (Goals)
1948–1950	Essendon	9 (11)
1950–1954	Geelong	78 (278)
Total		87 (289)
- ^{1} Playing statistics correct to the end of 1955.

Career highlights
- Geelong premiership player: 1951, 1952

George Goninon (18 April 1927 – 7 December 2023) was an Australian rules footballer in the Tasmanian North West Football Union (NWFU) and Victorian Football League (VFL).

Goninon was Geelong's champion goalkicker at full-forward in the 1951 and 1952 Grand Final wins, including kicking 11 goals in the 1951 Semi-Final, the equal-most goals scored in a VFL/AFL final, and the last player to get a double-digit goal tally in a final for 43 years (when Garry Lyon kicked 10 goals in a semi-final in 1994).

He was going strong in 1953, with the Cats being hot favourites to make it three in a row. However, he was dropped from the team that would go on to lose the flag to Collingwood by two goals as a consequence of his marital infidelity. In 2007, then 80 and living on the Gold Coast, the twice-married Goninon claimed he was a "victim of the times", a strict "church-on-Sundays age" when, being married, he had an affair and was found out (thus causing his potentially crucial omission). Geelong, with 90% churchgoers at the time, frowned on him and coerced the club to drop him out of the team in the midst of the final series despite kicking 65 goals from 18 games in 1953 and being Geelong's leading goalkicker for the fourth successive year.
