= Deaths in April 1985 =

The following is a list of notable deaths in April 1985.

Entries for each day are listed alphabetically by surname. A typical entry lists information in the following sequence:

- Name, age, country of citizenship at birth, subsequent country of citizenship (if applicable), reason for notability, cause of death (if known), and reference.

== April 1985 ==
=== 1 ===
- Wilhelm Brückner-Rüggeberg, 78, German conductor.
- Frank Bykowski, 70, American football player and coach.
- Alec Clifton-Taylor, 77, English architectural historian and television presenter.
- Gerald Gregg, 78, American book cover artist.
- Gregorio Sciltian, 84, Russian Armenian-Italian painter.
- Alexander Severance, 79, American basketball and baseball coach, heart attack.
- Larry Shaw, 60, American science fiction author and literary agent, cancer.
- Julian Thornton-Duesbery, 82, British academic administrator and Anglican prelate.
- Douglass Wallop, 65, American novelist (The Year the Yankees Lost the Pennant) and playwright.

=== 2 ===
- Kelly Alexander Sr., 69, American civil rights activist, chair of the NAACP (1983–1984).
- S. Omar Barker, 90, American politician and poet, member of the New Mexico House of Representatives (1924–1926).
- Dame Doris Fitton, 87, Australian actress and theatre director.
- Witold Gieras, 87, Polish footballer.
- John Richardson, 76, English cricketer.
- Alexandre Rignault, 84, French actor.
- Bernard Shore, 89, English viola player.
- William Stevenson, 84, American diplomat, academic administrator and Olympic track and field athlete (1924).
- John-Michael Tebelak, 35, American playwright, heart attack.
- Paul Wohl, 84, German-American journalist.

=== 3 ===
- Hugo Balzer, 90, German conductor.
- Leo Douglass, 84, American football player.
- Jimmy Kelly, 70, Irish hurler.
- Helmut Niedermayr, 69, German racing driver.
- Frode Onarheim, 85, Norwegian military officer and businessman.
- Oreco, 52, Brazilian footballer.
- Dan Ormsbee, 101, American architect.
- Ganapati Ram, 58, Indian politician, MP (1952–1967).
- Leo Riemens, 74, Dutch musicologist.
- Toivo Sariola, 70, Finnish Olympic sprinter (1936).
- Frazier Thomas, 66, American television personality (Garfield Goose and Friends), stroke.
- William Twaits, 74, Canadian oil executive.
- Bazyli Wójtowicz, 86, Polish sculptor.
- Hsien-wen Wu, 85, Chinese zoologist.

=== 4 ===
- Dinara Asanova, 42, Soviet Kyrgyzstani film director, heart disease.
- Raymond Briggs, 90, English general.
- Bob Chitty, 68, Australian footballer.
- Mildred Cram, 95, American author and screenwriter.
- Ramón Alva de la Canal, 92, Mexican artist, heart attack.
- Calvin S. Hall, 76, American psychologist.
- Hanon Izakson, 76, Soviet mechanical engineer.
- Yisrael Mendel Kaplan, 71, American Orthodox Jewish rabbi.
- Roy Long, 70, Australian footballer.
- Mary Elizabeth Sharpe, 100, American architect and philanthropist.
- Hannes Sirola, 94, Finnish Olympic gymnast (1912).
- William B. Stansbury, 62, American politician, traffic collision.
- Hermann Strasburger, 75, German historian.
- Georg von Boisman, 74, Swedish Olympic pentathlete (1936).

=== 5 ===
- Ernie Coward, 69, Australian footballer.
- Charis Frankenburg, 93, British author.
- Tyrell Johnson, 68, Trinidadian cricketer.
- Philip Jongeneel, 91, Dutch Olympic rower (1920).
- Connie Kelly, 36, Irish hurler.
- Bill Kern, 78, American football player and coach.
- Lo Man-wai, 89-90, Hong Kong politician and lawyer.
- Emil Milan, 62, American woodcarver.
- Arthur Negus, 82, British television personality and antiques expert.
- Fran Polsfoot, 57, American football player and coach, brain cancer.
- Hannes Schroll, 75, Austrian ski racer.
- Hal Totten, 83, American sportscaster.
- Margaret Trowell, 80-81, British artist.
- Gerhard Wilck, 86, German soldier.

=== 6 ===
- Edward Cleary, 71, Australian cricketer.
- Arnold Daghani, 76, Romanian-English diarist.
- Mark Lothar, 82, German composer.
- Henriette Mathieu-Faraggi, 69, French nuclear physicist
- André Néron, 62, French mathematician.
- Terence Sanders, 83, British Olympic rower (1924).
- Maria Stencel, 85, Polish nurse.
- Stanisław Zaczyk, 61, Polish actor.

=== 7 ===
- Bajou Baijnauth, 68, Guyanese cricketer.
- Michael Blees, 22, Australian footballer.
- Torstein Børte, 85, Norwegian politician.
- Paul Fayman, 63, Polish-born Australian property developer.
- Geoffrey Loney, 91, Australian cricketer.
- David Loveday, 88, British Anglican prelate.
- Willie McRae, 61, Scottish activist, lawyer and politician, suicide by gunshot.
- Luther Metke, 100, American poet.
- Jack Mitchell, 87, American banker and businessman (United Airlines).
- Carl Schmitt, 96, German political theorist.

=== 8 ===
- J. Fred Coots, 87, American songwriter ("Santa Claus Is Comin' to Town").
- Rosa Estiarte, 25, Spanish Olympic swimmer (1976), suicide.
- Julieta Kirkwood, 49, Chilean feminist activist and sociologist.
- Eugen König, 88, German general.
- Phonse Kyne, 69, Australian footballer.
- Helen Moses, 79, American Olympic swimmer (1920).
- Wilf Nixon, 102, English footballer.
- Adam Smith, 81, American Olympic swimmer (1924).
- Joe Sullivan, 74, American baseball player, lung cancer.
- Charlie Wilson, 79, English footballer.

=== 9 ===
- Gordon Clark, 82, American philosopher and theologian.
- Mary Beth Dolin, 49, American-born Canadian politician, breast cancer.
- Ella Ehlers, 80, German educator and activist.
- Donald B. Fullerton, 92, American missionary and evangelist.
- Arthur C. Hohmann, 89, American police officer.
- Sana'a Mehaidli, 16, Lebanese militant, suicide bombing.
- Şaziye Moral, 81-82, Turkish actress.
- Allan K. Smith, 96, American attorney.
- Ernie Taylor, 59, English footballer.

=== 10 ===
- David Blair, 67, Scottish golfer.
- Cora Coralina, 95, Brazilian author.
- Angelo Donghia, 50, American interior designer, pneumonia.
- Alfredo Duhalde, 86, Chilean politician, vice president and acting president (1946).
- Dame Annis Gillie, 84, British physician.
- Charles William Johnson, 93, Canadian politician.
- Robert Maragh, 50, Jamaican cricketer.
- C. S. Schilbred, 78, Norwegian genealogist and historian.
- Klaus Scholder, 55, German historian.
- Eusebio Sempere, 62, Spanish artist.
- Zisis Verros, 104, Greek guerrilla fighter.

=== 11 ===
- Bunny Ahearne, 84, British ice hockey administrator.
- Jackie Bestall, 84, English footballer.
- Arthur Carson, 89, American academic administrator.
- André de Dienes, 71, Hungarian-American photographer.
- Susan Ertz, 98, English author.
- Tullio Favali, 38, Italian missionary, shot.
- Gennady Galkin, 50, Soviet Olympic diver (1956, 1960).
- John Gilroy, 86, English artist and illustrator.
- Enver Hoxha, 76, Albanian dictator, first secretary (since 1941) and prime minister (1944–1954), arrhythmia.
- Samuel K. McConnell Jr., 84, American politician, member of the U.S. House of Representatives (1944–1957).
- Enid McLeod, 88-89, British cultural diplomat.
- Peter Alsing Nielsen, 77, Danish painter.
- Ram Narayan Sharma, 69, Indian politician and independence activist.
- Catherine Stermann, 35, French actress, suicide.
- Olga Tufnell, 80, British archaeologist.
- Fred Uhlman, 84, German-English writer and painter.
- Henriëtte van den Brandeler, 100, Dutch composer.
- Gunnar Westman, 70, Danish sculptor.
- Bela Zaboly, 74, Hungarian-American cartoonist (Popeye), heart disease.

=== 12 ===
- Édouard Baumann, 90, French footballer.
- Louise Seaman Bechtel, 90, American author and book editor.
- Thomas Dixon, 79, Irish cricketer.
- Cecil Manning, 92, British politician, MP (1944–1950).
- Seiji Miyaguchi, 71, Japanese actor.
- Vicenç Sasot, 67, Spanish football player and manager.
- Herman Alfred Schmid, 74, American general.
- Floyd Theard, 40, American basketball player and coach, heart attack.
- Ramavtar Tyagi, 60, Indian poet.
- Ron Walden, 77, Australian footballer.

=== 13 ===
- Mahmut Bajraktarević, 75, Yugoslav Bosnian mathematician.
- Justin W. Brierly, 79, American educator and lawyer.
- Jack Buckley, 81, English footballer.
- Sir Clavering Fison, 92, English politician and businessman, MP (1929–1931).
- Kit Klein, 75, American Olympic speed skater (1932).
- Margarete Hielscher, 85, German doctor and war criminal.
- Maurits Lieftinck, 81, Dutch entomologist.
- Oscar Nemon, 79, Croatian-born English sculptor.
- Nancy V. Rawls, 59, American diplomat.

=== 14 ===
- Elvin Barr, 76, Australian footballer.
- Everett Busch, 92, American general.
- Noele Gordon, 65, English actress, stomach cancer.
- Takis Miliadis, 62, Greek actor, injuries sustained in a traffic collision.
- Kate Roberts, 94, Welsh author.
- Glyn Samuel, 67, Welsh cricketer.
- Fred Stammers, 66, Australian footballer.

=== 15 ===
- Zarifa Aliyeva, 60, Soviet Azerbaijani ophthalmologist, cancer.
- Sir Raphael Cilento, 91, Australian medical practitioner.
- Chick Davies, 85, American basketball coach.
- Sambhu Nath De, 70, Indian virologist and toxicologist.
- C. Sydney Frost, 91, Canadian banker.
- Buck Giles, 81, American baseball player.
- Frank Ingram, 79, Canadian ice hockey player.
- Bernabe Lovina, 63, Filipino Olympic sprinter (1948).
- Elisa Martínez Contreras, c. 85, Guatemalan socialite, first lady (1945–1951).
- Jack Medica, 70, American Olympic swimmer (1936), heart attack.
- Sir Frank Meere, 89, Australian public servant.
- Myles Murray, 78, Canadian politician.
- Hedevig Rasmussen, 82, Danish Olympic swimmer (1924).
- Inés Rodena, 79, Cuban radio and television writer.
- Marc-Gilbert Sauvajon, 75, French film director.
- Sam Weaver, 76, English footballer.
- Moehadji Widjaja, 54, Indonesian politician, heart attack.

=== 16 ===
- Tadeusz Bartosik, 59, Polish actor.
- Scott Brady, 60, American actor (Shotgun Slade), respiratory failure.
- George A. Cincotta, 70, American politician, member of the New York State Assembly (1959–1978), heart attack.
- Katharina Kern, 84, German anti-Nazism activist.
- Ed McGinley, 85, American football player and coach.
- Robert Cotton Money, 96, British general.
- T. L. Sherred, 69, American science fiction author.
- Benny Zientara, 67, American baseball player.

=== 17 ===
- John Selwyn Bromley, 71-72, British naval historian.
- Basil Bunting, 85, British poet.
- Reginald Craig, 68, Australian cricketer.
- Lula Owl Gloyne, 93, American nurse.
- Mario Mazzacurati, 81, Italian racing driver.
- Evadne Price, 96, Australian-British writer, actress and astrologer.
- Germaine Sablon, 85, French singer and actress.
- Walter Weir, 55, Canadian politician, heart attack.

=== 18 ===
- James Briley, 28, American convicted serial killer, execution by electric chair.
- Gertrude Caton Thompson, 97, English archaeologist.
- Friedrich Kiefer, 87, German zoologist.
- D. I. Suchianu, 89, Romanian essayist.
- Josip Weissgerber, 62, Yugoslav Croatian philosopher and missionary.

=== 19 ===
- Pavel Batov, 87, Soviet general.
- Jack Broome, 84, American-born British naval officer.
- Józef Gromek, 53, Polish chess player, heart attack.
- Willie Mabon, 59, American R&B musician.
- John Manifold, 69, Australian poet.
- Bruce R. McConkie, 69, American Mormon apostle.
- Ivan Menzies, 89, English actor and singer.
- Anthony Murmu, 54, Indian politician, MP (1977–1980), shot.
- Chabela Romero, 48, Mexican professional wrestler.
- Richard Rudgard, 83, British Anglican prelate.
- Jacques Sauthier, 79-80, Swiss Olympic boxer (1924).
- Sergei Tokarev, 85, Russian ethnologist.

=== 20 ===
- Michel Bernheim, 77, French filmmaker.
- Harry C. Butcher, 83, American radio broadcaster, complications from Alzheimer's disease.
- James Smoot Coleman, 66, American political scientist, heart attack.
- Mervyn Twynam Davis, 68, Australian landscape architect.
- Rudolf Gnägi, 67, Swiss politician, president (1971, 1976), heart attack.
- Jack Horsell, 70, Australian cricketer.
- Kehos Kliger, 80, Russian-Argentine poet.
- Anton Løkkeberg, 57, Norwegian footballer.
- Pierre de Muralt, 88, Swiss Olympic equestrian (1928).
- William O'Grady, 60, Irish footballer.
- Jerome F. O'Malley, 53, American general, plane crash.
- Vasco Peeples, 79, American politician, member of the Florida House of Representatives (1929).
- André Rollet, 79, French footballer.
- Harold Smallwood, 70, American Olympic sprinter (1936).
- Joseph Stampf, 65, American basketball player and coach.
- Scoop Usher, 71, American politician, member of the Missouri House of Representatives (1974–1979).
- Sir Ian Wark, 85, Australian chemist.
- Cornelis Zwikker, 84, Dutch chemist and physicist.

=== 21 ===
- Astrid Hjertenæs Andersen, 69, Norwegian poet.
- John Dutton, 75, British trade unionist.
- Francis Eaton, 4th Baron Cheylesmore, 91, British hereditary peer.
- Rudi Gernreich, 62, Austrian-born American fashion designer, cancer.
- Foster Hewitt, 82, Canadian radio broadcaster, complications from Alzheimer's disease.
- Jaroslav Košnar, 54, Czechoslovak footballer.
- Irving Mills, 91, Russian-born American music publisher.
- Ghost Mulenga, 31, Zambian footballer, malaria.
- Władysław Nadratowski, 92, Polish Olympic rower (1924).
- Tancredo Neves, 75, Brazilian politician, president-elect, prime minister (1961–1962).
- Oddvar Nygaard, 65, Norwegian accordionist.
- Paul Pascon, 53, Moroccan sociologist, traffic collision.
- Alfred Powell, 76, English cricketer.
- Riva Ridge, 16, American Thoroughbred racehorse, heart attack.
- Bernie Smith, 57, Australian footballer.
- Sir Owen Temple-Morris, 88, British politician and barrister, MP (1931–1942).
- John Welsh, 70, Irish actor.
- Carl A. Wiley, 66, American engineer and mathematician.

=== 22 ===
- Paul Hugh Emmett, 84, American chemist, Parkinson's disease.
- Jacques Ferron, 64, Canadian physician and author, heart attack.
- A. C. Gimson, 67, English phonetician.
- Basile Khoury, 84, Lebanese Greek Catholic prelate.
- Vladimir Kvarchelia, 65-66, Soviet Abkhazian politician.
- Yelena Lyubimova, 59-60, Soviet geologist.
- Parelius Mentsen, 82, Norwegian trade unionist.
- Sir Thomas Parry, 80, Welsh writer and academic.
- Syd Scott, 71, English golfer.
- Sō Takeyuki, 77, Japanese aristocrat and academic.

=== 23 ===
- Wilfrid S. Bronson, 90, American author and artist.
- Jack Bryan, 88, English cricketer.
- Joan Croydon, 76, American actress.
- Leônidas da Selva, 58, Brazilian footballer.
- Fred Doederlein, 78, German actor.
- Sam Ervin, 88, American politician, member of the U.S. Senate (1954–1974) and House of Representatives (1946–1947), emphysema.
- Frank Farrell, 67, Australian rugby player, heart attack.
- Herbert Graetz, 92, Australian Olympic rower (1924).
- Eddie Heron, 74, Irish Olympic diver (1948).
- Sarah T. Hughes, 88, American judge and lawyer.
- Billy Sanders, 29, Australian speedway racer, suicide.
- Kent Smith, 78, American actor, heart failure.
- David H. N. Spence, 59, Scottish botanist.
- Asbjørn Sunde, 75, Norwegian politician.
- Joe Vlasits, 64, Hungarian-Australian football player and manager.
- Patrick Wilkinson, 77, English classical scholar.
- Bob Wilson, 60, American baseball player.
- Whitey Wistert, 73, American football and baseball player.
- Sergei Yutkevich, 80, Soviet filmmaker.

=== 24 ===
- Paolo Borghese, 80, Italian nobleman.
- Jack Cutting, 61, English footballer.
- Kenneth Golding, 63, Singaporean Olympic sailor (1956).
- Bernt Ingvaldsen, 82, Norwegian politician, MP (1945–1973).
- Yitzhak Kahan, 71, Austrian-Israeli jurist.
- Alan McCrory, 67, Australian footballer.
- Al Minns, 65, American jazz dancer, cancer.
- Hans Neij, 63, Swedish general, drowned.
- Yoichi Okamoto, 69, American photographer, suicide by hanging.
- Mildred W. Pelzer, 95, American artist.
- Václav Procházka, 80, Czechoslovak Olympic equestrian (1936).
- H. M. S. Richards, 90, American evangelist (Voice of Prophecy) and author.
- Mark Starr, 90, British-American labor historian, pneumonia.
- Albert Turner, 84, English footballer.
- Katharine Elkus White, 78, American politician and diplomat.

=== 25 ===
- Hugo Miguel Arrambide, 57, Argentine Olympic equestrian (1964, 1968, 1972).
- Ioan Dragomir, 79, Romanian Greek Catholic prelate.
- Edna Duge, 82, American educator.
- Richard Haydn, 80, British actor (The Sound of Music, Alice in Wonderland, Please Don't Eat the Daisies) and comedian, heart attack.
- Zoltán Horusitzky, 81, Hungarian composer.
- Viktor Kupradze, 81, Soviet Georgian mathematician.
- Bennie Lunn, 79, Australian footballer.
- Uku Masing, 75, Estonian theologian and polymath.
- Murray Matheson, 72, Australian-American actor, heart failure.
- Dorothy Nickerson, 84, American color scientist.
- Erich Schumann, 87, German physicist.
- Francis Parker Shepard, 87, American sedimentologist.
- Ellen Savage, 72, Australian nurse.
- Ernie Smith, 75, American football player.
- Sidney Smith, 56, English cricketer.
- Henk van der Meer, 69, Dutch Olympic rower (1948).

=== 26 ===
- Roberto Caló, 72, Argentine pianist and composer.
- Roman Czerniawski, 75, Polish-British air force officer and Allied double agent.
- Yvonne Degraine, 85, French Olympic swimmer (1920).
- Gitta Gradova, 80, American pianist.
- Kåre Martin Hansen, 71, Norwegian politician, MP (1961–1969).
- David Sinton Ingalls, 86, American flying ace.
- Björn Jónsson, 68, Icelandic politician.
- Lauri Kennedy, 88, Australian cellist.
- Adolf Maislinger, 81, German anti-Nazism activist.
- Albert Maltz, 76, American screenwriter and playwright, member of the Hollywood Ten, complications from a stroke.
- Alex Mengel, 30, Guyanese-born American serial killer, shot.
- Savitri Sahni, 82, Indian paleobotanist.
- Terry Woodgate, 65, English footballer.

=== 27 ===
- Wilhelm Abel, 80, German economist.
- Ubaidullah Anwar, 58, Pakistani Islamic scholar.
- Alexander Armstrong, 68, Australian politician.
- James Dunn, 59, British politician, MP (1964–1983).
- William G. East, 77, American judge.
- Heinrich Gattineau, 80, German economist and businessman.
- Friedrich Märker, 92, German writer and theatre critic.
- Pierre Kamel Medawar, 97, Israeli Greek Catholic prelate.
- Placid J. Podipara, 85, Indian Syriac Catholic priest and scholar.
- Gordon Ross, 67-68, English sports journalist.
- Fred Wampler, 61, American golfer, leukemia.
- Leon Wiśniewski, 48, Polish field hockey player.
- Tommy Woodcock, 79, Australian racehorse trainer.

=== 28 ===
- Rockin' Dave Allen, 43, American blues musician, pneumonia.
- Cougar Annie, 96, American-born Canadian gardener.
- Carlos Dante, 79, Argentine singer.
- Rahim Gul, 60-61, Pakistani writer and filmmaker, kidney failure.
- Jean L'Hôte, 56, French filmmaker.
- Hoyt Ming, 82, American fiddler.
- Anthony Mark Spencer, 29-30, Australian outlaw biker, suicide by hanging.
- Marjorie Steel, 81, British social worker.
- Zhang Tianyi, 78, Chinese author and writer.

=== 29 ===
- Robert J. Brown, 80, American football player.
- Carmen da Silva, 65, Brazilian journalist and feminist activist.
- King-Sun Fu, 54, Taiwanese-American computer scientist.
- James Macholtz, 58, American football coach, heart attack.
- James F. Prendergast, 68, American politician, member of the Pennsylvania House of Representatives (1959–1978).

=== 30 ===
- Verlin Adams, 66, American football player.
- Sir Max Aitken, 2nd Baronet, 75, Canadian-British flying ace.
- Sofía Álvarez, 71, Colombian-Mexican actress and singer.
- Alberto Bragaglia, 89, Italian painter.
- David Cummings, 36, Canadian Olympic wrestler (1976), plane crash.
- Ida Daly, 83, American disability activist.
- Hazen Hansard, 79-80, Canadian lawyer.
- Mickey Katz, 75, American musician and comedian, kidney failure.
- Edgar Mountain, 84, British Olympic runner (1920, 1924) and geologist.
- Franco Ressel, 60, Italian actor.
- Mike Sangster, 44, British tennis player, heart attack.
- Albert Gerard Schatz, 63, American judge.
- Hans Speth, 87, German general.
- Scot Symon, 73, Scottish football player and manager.
- Sándor Török, 81, Hungarian author and journalist.
- Jules White, 84, Austrian-born American film director and producer.
