= Chinese Songs =

Chinese song is an art form of China.

Chinese Songs may refer to:

- Chinese Songs (Tcherepnin), by Alexander Tcherepnin
- 6 Chinese Songs, sung in Hungarian, by György Kósa (1897–1984)
- 8 Chinese Songs, for pipa by Zhou Long (b.1953)
- Two Chinese Folk Songs, for piano, by Ronald Stevenson (1928–2015)
- 2 Chinese Songs, for soprano and piano by Marga Richter (b.1926)
- 6 Chinese Songs, Op. 13, sung in Hungarian by Zoltán Horusitzky (1903–85)
