= International cricket in 1931 =

International cricket season

The 1931 International cricket season was from April 1931 to August 1931.

== Season overview ==
International tours
Start date	Home team	Away team	Results [Matches]			
Start date	Home team	Away team	Test	ODI	FC	LA
27 June 1931	England	New Zealand	1–0 [3]	—	—	—
27 June 1931	Ireland	Scotland	—	—	1–0 [1]	—
10 August 1931	Netherlands	England	—	—	1–2 [3]	—
29 August 1931	Belgium	Netherlands	—	—	0–1 [1]	—

== June ==
=== New Zealand in England ===
Test series
No.	Date	Home captain	Away captain	Venue	Result
Test 209	27–30 June	Douglas Jardine	Tom Lowry	Lord's, London	Match drawn
Test 210	29–31 July	Douglas Jardine	Tom Lowry	Kennington Oval, London	England by an innings and 26 runs
Test 211	15–18 August	Douglas Jardine	Tom Lowry	Old Trafford Cricket Ground, Manchester	Match drawn

=== Scotland in Ireland ===
Three-day Match
No.	Date	Home captain	Away captain	Venue	Result
Match	27–30 June	Thomas Dixon	John Kerr	College Park, Dublin	Ireland by 72 runs

== August ==
=== England in Netherlands ===
Two-day Match Series
No.	Date	Home captain	Away captain	Venue	Result
Match 1	10–11 August	Not mentioned	Not mentioned	The Hague	Free Foresters by 6 wickets
Match 2	12–13 August	G Hamburger	Not mentioned	Laren	Hamburger's XI by 4 wickets
Match 3	15–16 August	Not mentioned	Not mentioned	Haarlem	Free Foresters by 8 wickets

=== Netherlands in Belgium ===
Two-day Match
No.	Date	Home captain	Away captain	Venue	Result
Match	29–30 August	Not mentioned	Not mentioned	Not mentioned	Netherlands by an innings and 23 runs
