= Sándor Török =

Sándor Török may refer to:

- Sándor Török (footballer) (born 1981), Hungarian footballer
- Sándor Török (writer) (1904–1985), Hungarian journalist, translator and writer
