= Laurence Duggan =

American economist

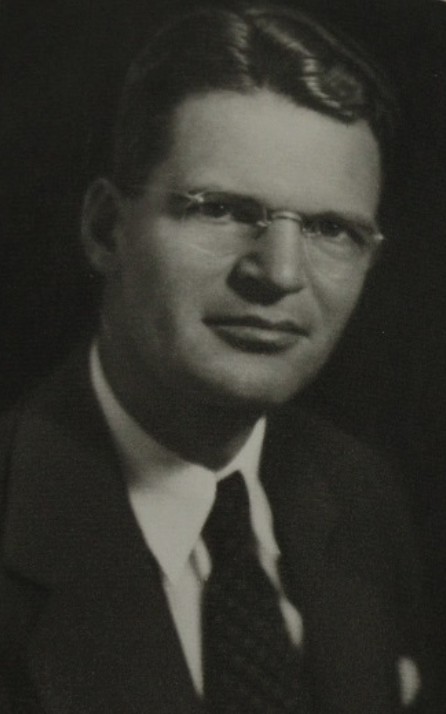
- Born: Laurence Hayden Duggan; May 28, 1905; New York City, New York, U.S.
- Died: December 20, 1948 (aged 43); New York City, New York, U.S.
- Cause of death: Fall from building
- Known for: Links to Soviet intelligence
- Spouse: Helen Boyd
- Children: 4
- Father: Stephen P. Duggan

Academic background
- Education: Phillips Exeter Academy; Harvard University

Academic work
- Institutions: Institute of International Education

Laurence Hayden Duggan (May 28, 1905 – December 20, 1948) was a 20th-century American economist who headed the South American desk at the United States Department of State during World War II, best known for falling to his death from the window of his office in New York, 10 days after questioning by the FBI about whether he had had contacts with Soviet intelligence.

Despite public accusations by Whittaker Chambers and others, Duggan's loyalty was attested to by such prominent people as Attorney General Tom C. Clark, Eleanor Roosevelt, and Duggan's close associate journalist Edward R. Murrow, among others. However, in the 1990s, evidence from decrypted Soviet telegrams revealed that he was an active Soviet spy for the KGB in the 1930s and 1940s.

== Background ==
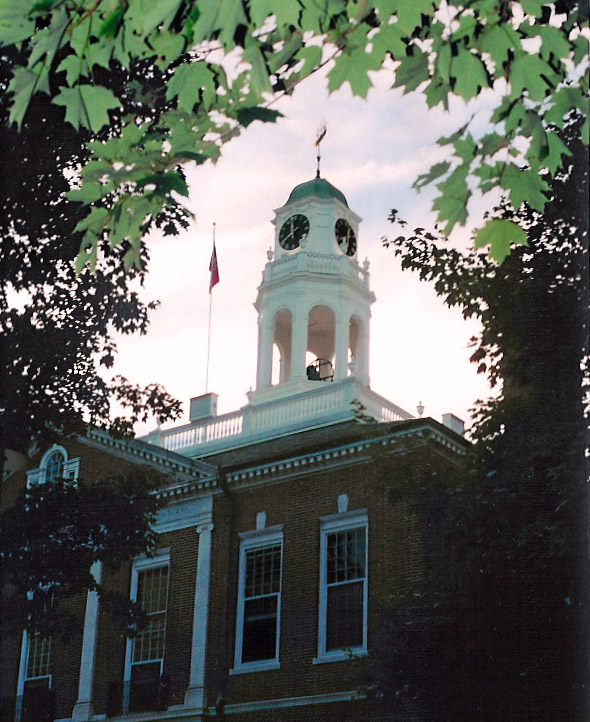
Phillips Exeter Academy's Academy Building

Laurence Hayden Duggan was born on May 28, 1905, in New York City. His father, Stephen P. Duggan, was a professor of Political Science at the City College of New York before founding the Institute of International Education (IIE). His mother Sarah Alice Elsesser was a director of the Negro Welfare League of White Plains, New York.

Duggan received early education at the Roger Ascham School in Hartsdale, New York, and White Plains Community Church, where he learned simplicity, courtesy, and democracy. In 1923, he graduated cum laude from the Phillips Exeter Academy. In 1927, he graduated with distinction from Harvard University. (Ware Group members such as Alger Hiss and Lee Pressman were 1929 graduates of Harvard Law School.) In 1930, when he joined State, he took postgraduate courses in history, government, and economics at the George Washington University.

== Career ==
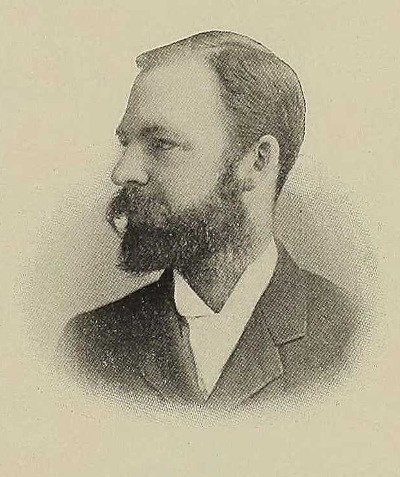
Dana Carleton Munro (1904) hired Duggan for Latin American affairs at the State Department

In 1927, Duggan began his career by working for Harper Brothers publishers. By 1929, his father, then director of the IIE, created a bureau for Latin America and offered the position to his son. Duggan accepted, learned Spanish and Portuguese, and toured the region to become better acquainted with it. By 1930, he had produced a report that reached Charles Howland, head of studies in international relations at Yale University. Howland forwarded the report to Dana Munro, chief of the Latin American Division, who offered Duggan a position.

=== Civil service ===
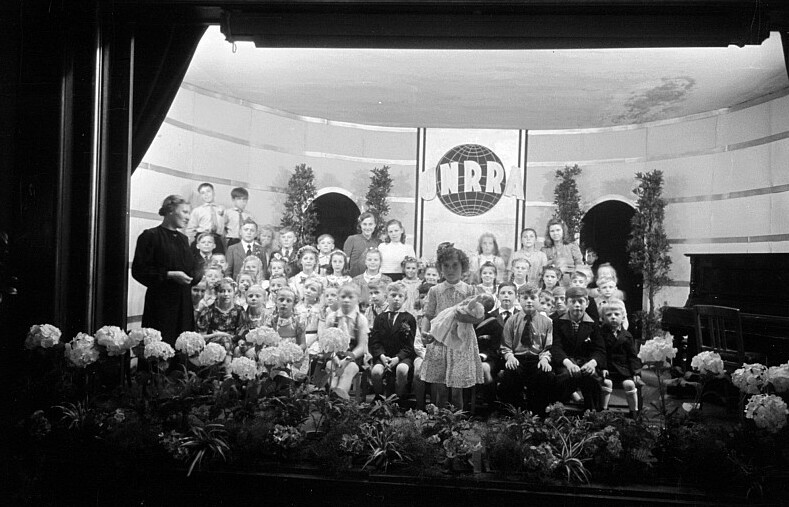
Mother's Day in UNRRA displaced persons camp in Germany

In 1930, Duggan moved to Washington, D.C. to join the U.S. Department of State. For nine years he was head of the Latin American Division and for four years he was adviser on political relations (his Harvard friend Noel Field had joined State in the late 1920s). Duggan assisted Secretary of State Cordell Hull at major conferences in Lima, Peru, and Havana, Cuba. Positions he held included Chief of the Division of the American Republics as well as Political Adviser and Director of the Office of the American Republics.

In 1944, Duggan returned briefly to the private sector, when he served as consultant on Latin American affairs–a "profitable business."

Shortly thereafter, Herbert H. Lehman (New York governor) and Dr. Eduardo Santos (former president of Colombia) asked Duggan to serve the United Nations Relief and Rehabilitation Administration (UNRRA) for six months (in 1936, Noel Field had taken a position with the League of Nations and in 1941 become director of the American Unitarian Universalist Service Committee's relief mission in Marseille).

=== IIE presidency ===
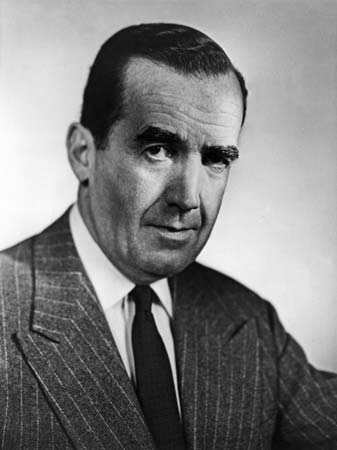
Edward R. Murrow, CBS News journalist and IIE trustee

In 1946, a committee of the IIE (comprising Virginia Gildersleeve of Barnard College, Edward R. Murrow of CBS News, Waldo Leland of the Carnegie Institute, and Arthur W. Packard of Rockefeller Brothers Fund) offered Duggan the presidency of the IIE upon his father's retirement. The IIE provided for a flow of exchange students between the United States and several other countries.

On November 1, 1946, Duggan began as IIE president. One of his first actions was to make the board more inclusive by adding women, union representatives ("labor men"), and African-Americans including Benjamin Mays of Morehouse College. He expanded students to include trainees, entrepreneurs, labor leaders, professionals, artists, and musicians. U.S. President Truman appointed Duggan to the ten-member administrators of the Fulbright Act. He provided advice during the establishment of UNESCO. In 1947, he served as a member of the U.S. delegation to the second session of the UNESCO general conference, held in Mexico City.

During his two years as president, IIE's funding increased its budget nearly 400% from $109,000 to $430,000. Funding from the Carnegie Corporation alone increased $50,000 per year during that time (and Alger Hiss became president of its sister organization, the Carnegie Endowment for International Peace within days of Duggan's appointment to the IIE).

== Espionage ==
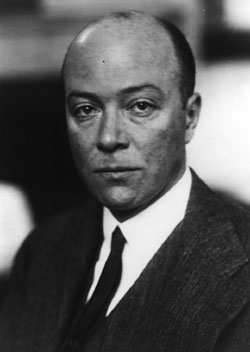
U.S. Ambassador William Christian Bullitt Jr., one of Duggan's (unwitting) sources

Duggan was a close friend of Noel Field of the State Department. The GRU had also tried to recruit him through Frederick Field.

In the mid-1930s, Duggan was recruited by Hede Massing as a Soviet spy. Duggan told the FBI that Henry Collins of the Ware group had also tried unsuccessfully to recruit him to the NKVD.

Peter Gutzeit, the Soviet Consul in New York City, was also an officer in the NKVD. In 1934, he identified Laurence Duggan as a potential recruit. Boris Bazarov told Hede Massing that they wanted her to help recruit Duggan and Noel Field. The plan, suggested by Gutzeit, was to use Duggan to draw Field into the network. Gutzeit wrote on 3 October 1934 that Duggan "is interesting us because through him one will be able to find a way toward Noel Field... of the State Department's European Department with whom Duggan is friendly."

Duggan provided Soviet intelligence with confidential diplomatic cables, including from American Ambassador William Bullitt. He was a source for the Soviets until he resigned from the State Department in 1944.

According to Whittaker Chambers in his 1952 memoir, Egmont Gaines proposed covert group, "insisting" the group approach Duggan, "whom he called 'very sympathetic'." Duggan was then in the State Department, and became chief of its Latin-American Division. According to Boris Bazarov, Duggan told his Soviet handlers, he remained "at his hateful job in the State Department" only because he was "useful for our cause."

== Personal life ==
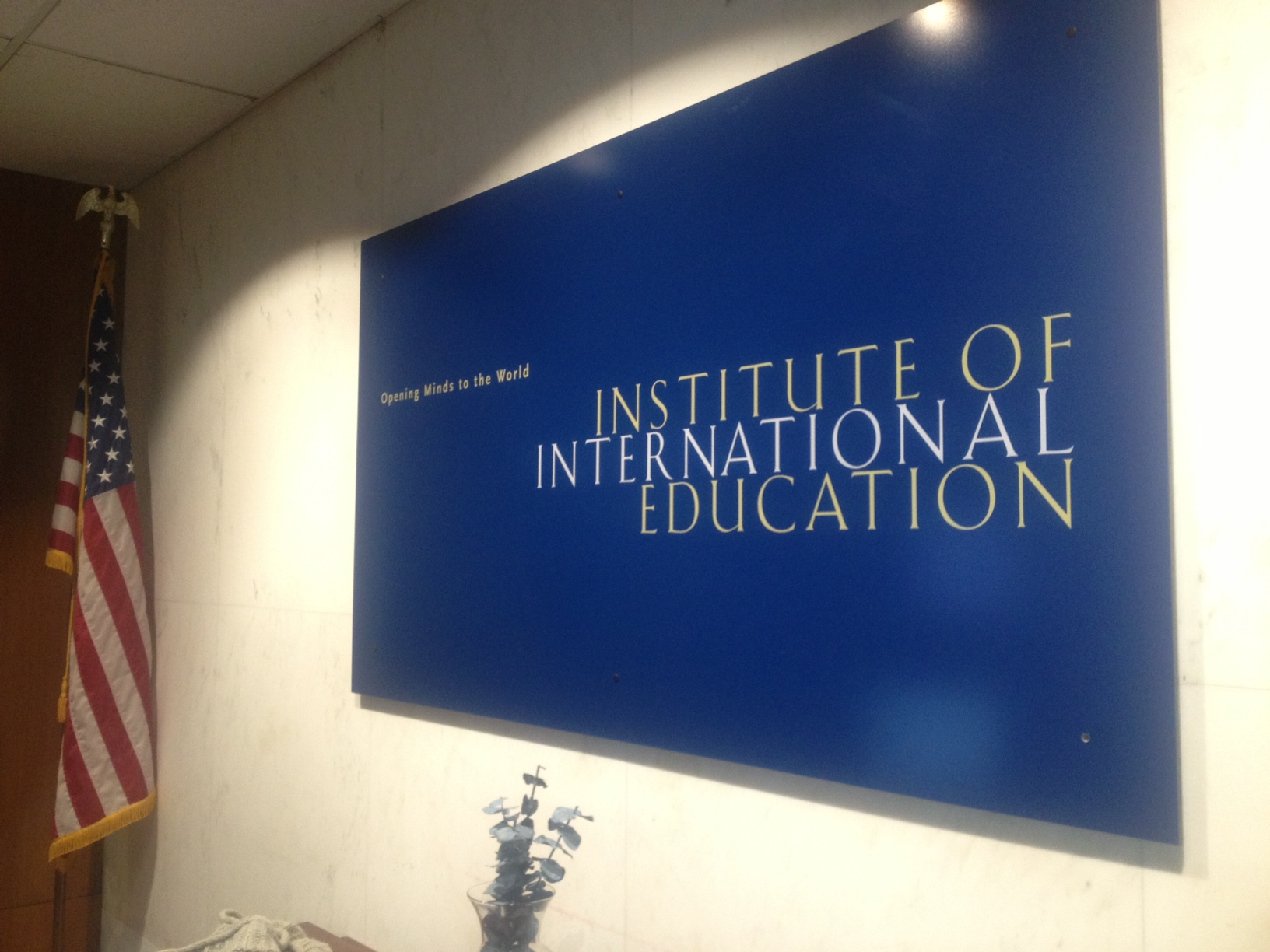
Interior of Institute of International Education, seen in 2014

In 1932, Duggan married Helen Boyd, a Vassar College graduate. They had four children. At the time of his death, the family lived in Scarsdale, New York.

=== Death ===
On December 20, 1948, Duggan fell to his death from his office at the IIE, located on the 16th floor at 2 West 45th Street in Midtown Manhattan. His body was discovered around 7 p.m. that evening. A few days later, the New York Police Department made public the result of its investigation, which concluded: "Mr. Duggan either accidentally fell or jumped."

During his last four days, he spoke with his father about funding for the IIE, his mother about Christmas, with Dr. Santos at the Waldorf-Astoria Hotel about US-Latin American relations, and on December 20 itself with Pierre Bédard, director of the French Institute, about inviting a distinguished French national to lecture in the United States under IIE auspices.

=== Remembrances ===
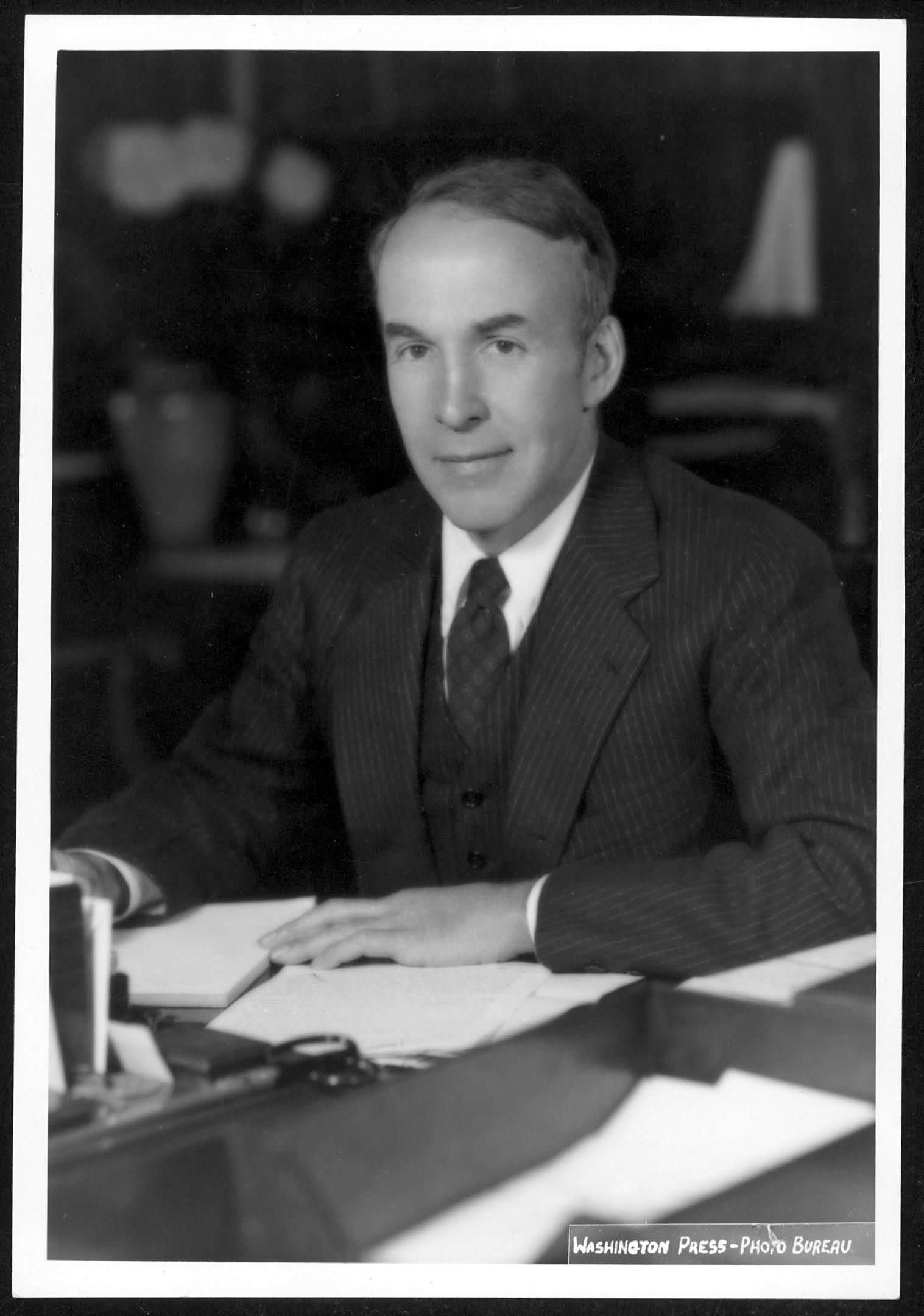
Archibald MacLeish, who composed a poem in Duggan's memory

Friends published a memorial book about Duggan, with contributions made directly to the book or gleaned from the press by: Eleanor Roosevelt, Tom C. Clark, Sumner Welles, Marquis Childs (friend), Edward R. Murrow, Roscoe Drummond, and Raymond Moley, Joseph Harsh, Elmer Davis, Martin Agronsky, Henry R. Luce, Clarence Pickett, and Harry Emerson Fosdick. Archibald MacLeish composed a memorial poem, published in the New York Herald Tribune.

On December 21, 1948, at 7:45 PM (barely 24 hours after Duggan's death), Murrow broadcast on CBS radio:

Tonight, the headlines are shouting: "Duggan Named in Spy Case." Who named him? Isaac Don Levine, who said he was quoting Whittaker Chambers. And who denies it? Whittaker Chambers. Tonight, Representative Mundt says: "The Duggan affair is a close book so far as the House Committee is concerned." The Representative from South Dakota also says he is thinking of making recommendations for changing the procedure at committee hearings, maybe even giving the accused person the right to be heard before the Committee issues a report.
The members of the Committee who have done this thing upon such slight and wholly discredited testimony may now consult their actions and their consciences.

== Venona project ==
The Venona project succeeded in decrypting some Soviet intelligence cables that had been intercepted in the mid-1940s. The code name used for Laurence Duggan in the decrypted transcripts is "Frank" and "19". He is referenced in the following Venona decryptions, which provided information to the Soviets about Anglo-American plans for invading Italy during World War II:

- 1025, 1035–1936, KGB New York to Moscow, June 30, 1943
- 380 KGB New York to Moscow, March 20, 1944
- 744, 746 KGB New York to Moscow, May 24, 1944
- 916 KGB New York to Moscow, June 17, 1944
- 1015 KGB New York to Moscow, to Victor [Fitin], July 22, 1944
- 1114 KGB New York to Moscow, August 4, 1944
- 1251 KGB New York to Moscow, September 2, 1944
- 1613 KGB New York to Moscow, November 18, 1944
- 1636 KGB New York to Moscow, November 21, 1944

== See also ==
- W. Marvin Smith
- Abraham Feller

== Sources ==
- Chambers, Whittaker (1952). Witness. New York: Random House.
- Haynes, John Earl; Harvey Klehr (2000). Venona: Decoding Soviet Espionage in America. Yale UnP. p. 202. ISBN 0300129874.
- Massing, Hede (1951). This Deception: KGB Targets America. Duell, Sloan and Pearce. pp. 176, 207–209.
- Vassiliev, Alexander (2003). "Notes on Anatoly Gorsky's December 1948 Memo on Compromised American Sources and Networks". Wilson Center.
- Welles, Benjamin Sumner (1949). Laurence Duggan 1905–1948: In Memoriam. Stamford, CT: Overbrook Press.
