= Hielscher =

Hielscher is a German surname. Notable people with the surname include:

- Friedrich Hielscher (1902–1990), German poet and philosopher
- Hans Uwe Hielscher (born 1945), German organist and composer
- Leo Hielscher (1926–2025), Australian administrator
- Margarete Hielscher (1899–1985), German doctor
- Margot Hielscher (1919–2017), German singer and film actress
- Ulf Hielscher (born 1967), German bobsledder

== See also ==
- Josef Emanuel Hilscher (1806–1837), Austrian soldier, poet and translator
- Kurt Hilscher (1904–1980), German illustrator
