= Marél von Steinling =

German painter (born 1933)

Marie-Gabrielle Spies von Büllesheim née von Steinling (born 16 June 1933), known as MARÉL, is a German artist.

2006 she received the Bundesverdienstkreuz am Bande (Federal German Order of Merit in the name of the President of the Federal Republic of Germany) for her art as well as her cultural and charitable contributions. She has lived in the Castle Metternich near Bonn since 1960.

== Life and career ==
Marél von Steinling was born in Eichstätt / Bavaria on 16 June 1933, as the daughter of Johanna née Hoenning O'Carroll, an artist.

Marél von Steinling studied from 1954 until 1958 at the Academy of Fine Arts Munich, including painting with Professor Erich Glette and sculpturing with Professor Heinrich Kirchner. Additionally, she took a training in the pedagogy of the arts. Already as a young artist she had exhibitions worldwide, – see description of the exhibition in the Bois de Boulogne, Paris.

On 30 June 1960, she married Franz-Leo Freiherr Spies von Büllesheim.

In 1962, aged 29, she received an offer of a position by Professor Gerhard Gollwitzer at the Staatliche Akademie der Bildenden Künste Stuttgart, / Academy of Fine Arts, which she could not accept because of the imminent birth of her second son, Already during her studies she repeatedly had exhibitions in one of the (formerly) most well known German art galleries, Galerie Karin Hielscher, – which had gained international importance for providing talented artists, a supportive forum.

Her work consists mainly of still life, landscape, and religious as well as abstract paintings, whereby the so-called 'Marél blue' ("Marél Blau") became her trademark. As portraitist she represents a late impressionistic style. She portrays people unembellished and with much character. She is included in the Great German Art Encyclopedia / das grosse ALLGEMEINE KÜNSTLER-LEXIKON / AKL (K. G. Saur Verlag / de Gruyter Berlin/New York – formerly THIEME-BECKER)

== Exhibitions ==
- among others, 1962: Munich, formerly Galerie Karin Hielscher, Galeriestr. 6 (Currently: Galerie Bartsch & Chariau)
- Rosenheim, Club of Art / Kunstverein Rosenheim
- 1970: Paris, Jardin du Luxembourg, Orangerie, Musée du Luxembourg (well known international exhibition of four important new artists)
- 1977: Bogotá, Museo del Arte de la Universidad National de Colombia, Students Union Building, Exhibition Hall of University, (Sole exhibition)
- 1977: Bogota, Galeria Mira, Avenida 82 / No 11-18 (Sole exhibition, aquarelle)
- 1979: Bonn, Bavarenhaus
- 1995: Dresden,
- 1996: Paris, 8e Grand Marché d' Art contemporain, Bois de Boulogne, 103, Rue de la Folie Méricourt, Organizer: Chambre Européenne pour l' economie et les finances, 31, Rue de la Procession, 75015 Paris
- 2005: Plauen, Deutsche Bank, supported by Kulturwerk
- 2005: Dresden, Dresdner Bank (historical main building), Dr.-Külz-Ring 10 (Einzelausstellung)
- 2006: Euskirchen near Bonn, Participation in the exhibition of the"Hospizdienst" (Social Service) "Wenn der Tod unser Leben berührt"

== Sources ==
- https://www.malermusicus.de/marel/marel_en.htm (text is under the terms of the GNU Free Documentation License)
