= Alex Mengel =

Guyanese-born murderer and suspected serial killer

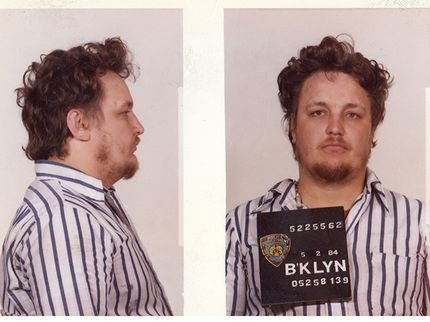
- Mengel in 1984
- Born: Alexander Mengel; January 29, 1955; Georgetown, Demerara-Mahaica, Guyana
- Died: April 26, 1985 (aged 30); Taconic State Parkway, New York, United States
- Cause of death: Gunshot wounds
- Other name: The Scalp Collector

Details
- Victims: 2–3+
- Span of crimes: February 24 – March 2, 1985
- Country: United States
- States: New York; Possibly Pennsylvania
- Date apprehended: March 2, 1985

Alexander Mengel (January 29, 1955 – April 26, 1985), also known as the Scalp Collector, was a Guyanese-born tool and die maker, security guard, fugitive, murderer and suspected serial killer who committed at least two murders during a week-long, cross-country crime spree in the United States and Canada in early-1985. While returning home from the Catskill Mountains on February 24, 1985, Mengel killed a patrol officer and fled on foot in Westchester County, New York.

Investigators believe that a day later Mengel abducted and killed a 44-year-old mother as she was leaving her job as a data processor at an IBM facility nearby. Using the victim's vehicle, Mengel made his way to the Canadian border. Mengel was eventually arrested by authorities on March 2, 1985, in Toronto, Canada. However, Mengel was killed while attempting to escape from custody on April 26. After his death, Mengel has also been considered a suspect in many unsolved murders and disappearances in New York and Pennsylvania, including the 1984 murder of a girl last seen near a Citibank in Flushing, Queens.

== Criminal spree ==
=== Murder of Gary Stymiloski ===
27-year-old Police Officer Gary Homer Stymiloski of Westchester County Police Department informed headquarters that he was conducting a routine traffic stop near the southbound Palmer Road exit on the Saw Mill River Parkway in Yonkers, New York on the evening of February 24, 1985, at 7 p.m. In four radio transmissions during a 20-minute period Stymiloski asked for a tow truck to impound the car, because the driver lacked a driver's license and current registration, and then called for assistance after discovering shotgun ammunition inside the vehicle. A half hour later, the officer was found slumped in the driver's seat of his patrol car with his handgun having been stolen, less than a mile away from the next southbound exit. Stymiloski had been shot three times.

An NYPD anti-crime unit located the suspect's vehicle, a 1973 Mercury Capri, two hours after Stymiloski’s murder on the 2200 block of Grand Concourse in the Morris Heights section. Authorities identified it as belonging to 30-year-old Guyanese immigrant Alex Mengel who emigrated to the country in November 1976. Mengel had only been arrested once in 1984 and was also unemployed and facing eviction.

At the time of the murder, Mengel's wife was living with their child in Richmond Hill, Queens under the auspices of a domestic violence program in hiding from her husband. Investigators learned that Mengel was returning from a weekend hunting trip in the Catskills, travelling with two friends, when Stymiloski flagged him down for speeding. The two companions told the police that Mengel had told them that he was going to kill Stymiloski and, with his instruction, they just had to drive the car back to his home. After killing Stymiloski, Mengel then stole the officer's patrol car; with his lifeless body still inside. An arrest warrant for Mengel was issued on February 27.

=== Attempted kidnapping ===
Authorities believe Mengel was responsible for the attempted kidnapping of a 13-year-old girl in Skaneateles, southwest of Syracuse, on February 27. The unidentified girl was delivering newspapers in Onondaga County when a stranger, a man dressed in women's clothing and wearing an ill-fitting wig, called her over to his car and asked her if he was in Auburn, New York. She responded; "No, you're in Skaneateles." When she began to walk away, the stranger pulled out a weapon and shouted; "Get in the car or I'll kill you!" The girl then ran away and took cover, escaping without injury, upon which the assailant drove away. The victim later identified Mengel out of a police line-up and agreed with detectives that the "wig" might just as well have been a woman's scalp.

=== Murder of Beverly Capone ===
In February, Toronto law enforcement officials saw Mengel outside a shopping mall. In an attempt to flee, his car hit a wall before veering onto a dead-end street, where he was captured and taken into custody. The stolen vehicle he was driving, a white 1985 Toyota Tercel, was registered to 44-year-old Beverly Capone, an IBM computer programmer reported missing by her family in Mount Vernon, New York on February 26. She disappeared after leaving work in Dobbs Ferry, New York while heading to her vehicle. Inside the car, a woman's scalp was discovered as well as Stymiloski’s .38 Caliber service revolver, and a Star Model S pistol which ballistics testing revealed was the weapon that had been used to kill Stymiloski. Though Mengel possessed Capone’s vehicle and driver’s license, he denied ever encountering her.

Items connected to Capone were eventually discovered by New York State Police on March 4 in a summer cabin owned by Mengel in the Catskills near East Durham, New York. A half-mile from the cabin in dense woods, the woman's remains were found eleven days later on March 15 under a pile of stones. Her assailant had hacked off her scalp and facial skin, and she had been stabbed once in the chest. The scalp found in Capone's car in Toronto and tissue samples from the body matched exactly. It is believed Mengel had planned on wearing her face and impersonating her as he was wearing her hair and had on lipstick at the time of his arrest.

=== Death ===
On March 26, Canadian authorities ordered Mengel's deportation to New York as an illegal immigrant with insufficient money to support himself. A grand jury in Westchester County charged Mengel with first-degree murder in the death of Stymiloski two days later. On April 8, Greene County followed suit and charged Mengel with second-degree murder in the Capone case. On April 26, Mengel attempted to elude his state police escort on the Taconic State Parkway while returning under guard after his arraignment in Greene County, New York. Mengel attacked State Trooper Officer Fred Grunwald who was sitting in the back seat with him while he was handcuffed, grabbing the officer's sidearm, but State Trooper Officer Robert Stabile, who was driving the vehicle, stopped the car and turned around and shot Mengel in the chest. Mengel died immediately. Grunwald had deep bite wounds on his arm and shoulder but both he and Stabile eventually received commendations for their actions.

== Additional victims ==
Due to the abrupt and violent nature of his murderous crime spree, Mengel was the subject of several posthumous investigations by the FBI in collaboration with both Canadian and Guyanese authorities to determine if he was potentially responsible for other offences. Ultimately, although they strongly suspected that he had killed before and had likely murdered Stymiloski out of concern that he would be arrested for prior crimes, they were unable to find any compelling evidence linking Mengel to any unsolved homicides. “I suspect Alex Mengel was involved in more than we know,” said retired Detective Sergeant Tom McGurn. In 2015, retired Police Officer David Paul and writer Kevin McMurray later published a true crime book entitled Unearthing a Serial Killer which provided circumstantial evidence that Mengel was a serial murderer:

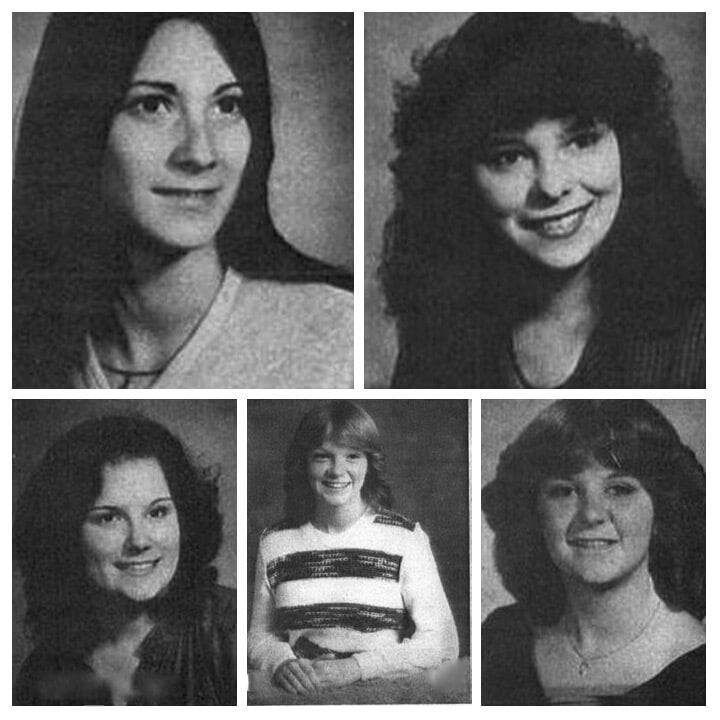
These images were found inside Mengel’s vehicle by Yonkers Police. Despite many efforts, the identities of the persons depicted in these photos remain unknown.

- When Mengel's 1973 Mercury Capri was examined by authorities in March 1985, police recovered a Pennsylvania tourism map secreted inside the vehicle's dashboard along with four wallet-size photos and one Polaroid photo of five young women. The individuals have been checked against homicide reports and missing person flyers but no identifications have ever been made. The map had a hand drawn circle around the Harrisburg, Pennsylvania area and within the circle were two areas indicated by an “X”. Investigators contacted the Pennsylvania State Police who informed them that, although not in the exact location marked on the map, they did have three unsolved murders nearby. The marked areas on Mengel's map were in the middle of the woods and according to Mengel's associates, he used to frequent that area for hunting and for attending car auctions in 1982.
- On Thanksgiving Day 1987, New York State Police discovered the corpse of missing 13-year-old Antonella Mattina in a shallow grave in Yorktown, New York near the Taconic State Parkway. Mattina was killed by multiple stab wounds to her chest area and her death was ruled as a homicide by the coroner's office. Mattina disappeared on July 16, 1984, at 11:00 a.m. from Flushing, New York. She was last seen successfully depositing checks on behalf of her father's business at the local Citibank branch located in the Linden Vue Shopping Center at Willets Point Boulevard and Parsons Boulevard. On February 25, 1985, a local resident contacted police in Flushing and told investigators that he had seen Mengel with Mattina on the day she vanished. Mengel's older brother lived just six blocks from where Antonella was last seen and Mengel's estranged wife claimed that Alex visited his brother on the day Antonella went missing. “I always felt the girl that was found on the Taconic State Parkway could have been connected to him, because that’s the route he took to go hunting,” McGurn observed. “It was just too much of a coincidence for me.” Mattina's case officially remains unsolved.
