= Edna Duge =

American educator (1902–1985)

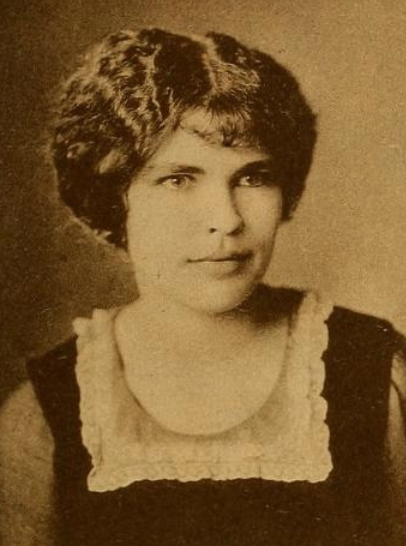
- Edna Duge, from the 1925 yearbook of Wellesley College
- Born: November 8, 1902; Greenwich, Connecticut
- Died: April 25, 1985; Greenwich, Connecticut
- Occupation: Educator

Edna Ella Duge (November 8, 1902 – April 25, 1985) was an American educator. She was associated with the Institute of International Education for much of her career, as director of the Latin-American Department in the 1940s, and as director of the Alumni Relations Division in the 1960s.

== Early life and education ==
Duge was from Greenwich, Connecticut, the daughter of John L. Duge and Mary A. Gerold Duge. Her father was a carpenter; her father and both maternal grandparents were born in Germany. She graduated from Wellesley College in 1925. She earned a master's degree at Columbia University in 1946, with a thesis titled "José Vasconcelos: A Study of his Attitudes Towards the United States."

== Career ==
After college, Duge was secretary at the International Migration Service, and executive secretary of the Institute de las Españas en los Estados Unidos at Columbia University. She was secretary to Stephen P. Duggan, the director of the Institute of International Education in 1928, when she made a two-month tour of German colleges; she was director of the institute's Latin-American Department in the 1940s. She toured in South America for three months in 1940, meeting with educators and promoting student exchanges between the United States and Latin American countries. In 1946, she was a co-author on the research report The Administration of Section Fourteen of the Fair Labor Standards Act of 1938 in Regard to Handicapped Workers: a Study in the Exercise of Administrative Discretion. In 1949, she was one of fourteen Americans rescued from flooding and mudslides in Guatemala.

Duge represented the Institute on a tour in Texas and Oklahoma in 1950. She took particular interest in encouraging women to consider study-abroad programs. In the 1960s she was head of the Institute's Alumni Relations Division, and conducted research on college study-abroad participation among American foreign service officers.

== Personal life ==
Duge died in 1985, aged 82 years, in Greenwich.
