= Patrick Dixon (cricketer) =

Irish cricketer (1907–1987)

Cricket information
- Batting: Right-handed
- Bowling: Right-arm medium; Leg-break

International information
- National side: Ireland

Career statistics
Competition	First-class
Matches	3
Runs scored	69
Batting average	11.50
100s/50s	0/0
Top score	47
Balls bowled	18
Wickets	0
Bowling average	–
5 wickets in innings	–
10 wickets in match	–
Best bowling	–
Catches/stumpings	1/–
- Source: CricketArchive, 6 December 2022

Patrick O'Madigan Dixon (9 October 1907 – 14 September 1987) was an Irish cricketer. He was a right-handed batsman, right-arm medium pace and leg-break bowler. He played just once for the Ireland cricket team, which was a first-class match against Scotland in June 1932.

He also played two first-class matches for Dublin University against Northamptonshire in 1926. His brother Thomas also represented Ireland at cricket.
