= Alan McCrory =

Australian rules footballer, born 1918

Personal information
- Full name: Allison Razey McCrory
- Born: 26 February 1918; Derry, Ireland
- Died: 24 April 1985 (aged 67)
- Original team: Carnegie
- Height: 178 cm (5 ft 10 in)
- Weight: 73 kg (161 lb)

Playing career^{1}
Years	Club	Games (Goals)
1938	Richmond	5 (2)
1940	Oaklleigh (VFA)	19 (53)
1941, 1943	South Melbourne	4 (2)
- ^{1} Playing statistics correct to the end of 1943.

Allison Razey 'Alan' McCrory (26 February 1918 – 24 April 1985) was an Australian rules footballer who played for the Richmond Football Club and South Melbourne Football Club in the Victorian Football League (VFL).

A key position player, McCrory also played for Oakleigh Football Club in the Victorian Football Association in 1940. He joined the Royal Australian Air Force towards the end of World War II, and later moved to Queensland where he worked as an airport fire officer until his retirement in 1974.
