= Herman Alfred Schmid =

United States Air Force general

¡Herman Alfred Schmid (3 August 1910 – 12 April 1985) was a brigadier general in the United States Air Force. He served in World War II and the Korean War.

== Biography ==
Schmid was born in Milwaukee, Wisconsin in 1910. He graduated from Pasadena Junior College in 1931.

== Career ==
In February 1933, Schmid graduated from the Air Corps Advanced Flying School at Kelly Field, Texas, and was commissioned a second lieutenant in the Air Reserve. He flew as a pilot, delivering air mail for the Army for a few months. He was the pilot of a Maxwell Field-based Keystone B-4A that was wrecked in a takeoff accident at the Valparaiso Bombing Range on 25 July 1936. He became a second lieutenant in the Regular Army Air Corps on 1 August 1936, and served as a flying instructor until June 1939. He then supervised civilian flying schools in Oklahoma, before taking various training posts throughout 1941.

During World War II, after assuming more training postings and graduating from the Empire Central Flying School in Hullavington, England in September 1943, he took part in the Burma Campaign, serving as assistant operations and Training Staff Officer in Calcutta, India, in May 1944. He was later assigned as a liaison officer with the Royal Air Force 221 Group. From July 1945 to February 1946, he commanded the Army Air Force India-Burma Theater Flying Training Center in Karachi. During the war, he flew 92 combat missions, mostly in P-47 Thunderbolts and P-38 Lightnings.

After the war, he returned to the United States and helped reestablish the Air National Guard.

In August 1949, he was assigned as the executive officer of the 4th Fighter-Interceptor Wing. During the Korean War, he took charge of the Suwon Air Base in Korea, then later commanded the 4th Wing, before returning to the United States. He flew the F-86 Sabre jet fighter on 10 missions.

He enrolled in the National War College in August 1952. Following graduation in June 1953, he was named Director of NATO Affairs in the Office of the United States Assistant Secretary of Defense for International Security Affairs. He was named Military Assistant to the United States Assistant Secretary of Defense for International Security Affairs in August 1955.

Awards he received include the Legion of Merit with oak leaf cluster, the Distinguished Flying Cross, and the Air Medal with two oak leaf clusters.
