= Glyn Samuel =

Welsh cricketer

Personal information
- Full name: Glyndwr Ninian Thomas Watkin Samuel
- Born: 26 October 1917; Swansea, Glamorgan, Wales
- Died: 14 April 1985 (aged 67); Hastings, Sussex, England
- Batting: Right-handed

Domestic team information
- Years: Team
- 1936: Glamorgan

Career statistics
Competition	FC
Matches	3
Runs scored	41
Batting average	10.25
100s/50s	–/–
Top score	22
Balls bowled	–
Wickets	–
Bowling average	–
5 wickets in innings	–
10 wickets in match	–
Best bowling	–
Catches/stumpings	–/–
- Source: Cricinfo, 1 July 2010

Glyndwr Ninian Thomas Watkin Samuel (26 October 1917 – 14 April 1985) was a Welsh cricketer. Samuel was a right-handed batsman. He was born at Swansea, Glamorgan. He was educated in his early years at Uppingham School, where he played for the school cricket team from 1934 to 1935.

Samuel made his first-class debut for Glamorgan in 1936 against Leicestershire. He made 2 further first-class appearances for the county in the 1936 season against Sussex and Nottinghamshire. In his 3 first-class matches he scored 41 runs at a batting average of 10.25, with a high score of 22.

Samuel died at Hastings, Sussex on 14 April 1985.
