= Roy Long =

Australian rules footballer, born 1914

Personal information
- Full name: Royal Hedley Long
- Born: 4 September 1914; Launceston, Tasmania
- Died: 4 April 1985 (aged 70); Kew, Victoria
- Original team: Launceston
- Height: 183 cm (6 ft 0 in)
- Weight: 80 kg (176 lb)

Playing career^{1}
Years	Club	Games (Goals)
1940	Hawthorn	2 (0)
- ^{1} Playing statistics correct to the end of 1940.

Royal Hedley Long (4 September 1914 – 4 April 1985) was an Australian rules footballer who played with Hawthorn in the Victorian Football League (VFL).
