= Yvonne Degraine =

French swimmer

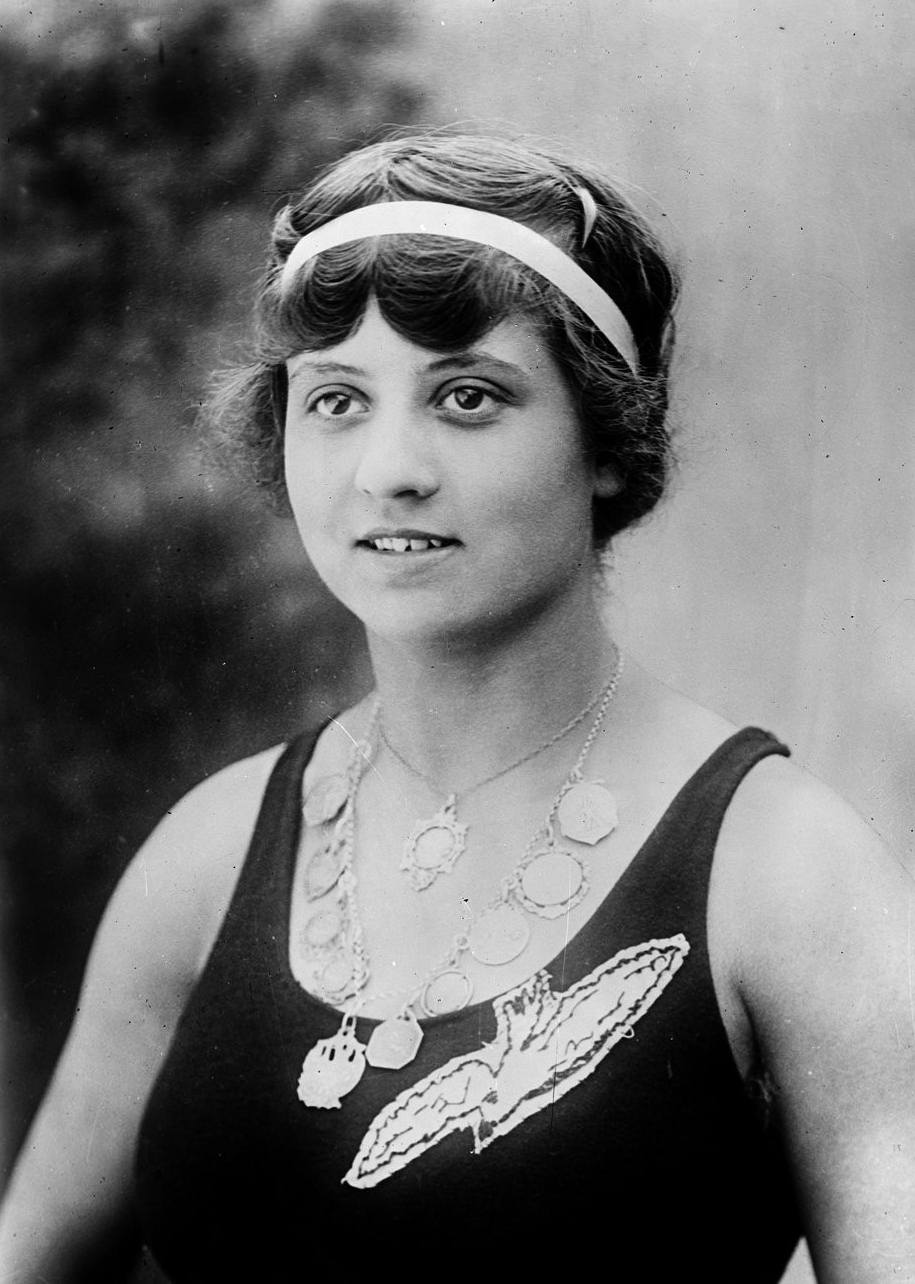
- Yvonne Degraine in 1920

Personal information
- Born: 7 October 1899 Paris, France
- Died: 26 April 1985 (aged 85) Talence, France

Sport
- Sport: Swimming
- Club: Mouettes Paris

Yvonne Blanche Louise Degraine (7 October 1899 – 26 April 1985) was a French swimmer. She competed at the 1920 Summer Olympics in the 100 m freestyle event, but failed to reach the final. She married Olympic cyclist Lucien Faucheux, but the marriage did not last.
