= William O'Grady (footballer) =

Irish footballer

Personal information
- Full name: William Augustine O'Grady
- Date of birth: 24 August 1924
- Place of birth: Limerick, Ireland
- Date of death: 20 April 1985 (aged 60)
- Place of death: Lewisham, London, England
- Position: Midfielder

Senior career*
Years	Team	Apps	(Gls)
1948–1949	Limerick		

International career
1948	Ireland (FAI)	1	(0)
- * Club domestic league appearances and goals

William Augustine O'Grady (24 August 1924 – 20 April 1985), also known as Bill O'Grady, was an Irish footballer who played as a midfielder and made one appearance for the FAI-organised Ireland national team at the 1948 Summer Olympics.

== Career ==
O'Grady made his sole appearance for the national team of the IFA on 26 July 1948 in the 1948 Summer Olympics against the Netherlands The match, which took place at Fratton Park in Portsmouth, finished as a 1–3 loss for Ireland.

== Career statistics ==
=== International ===
Ireland (FAI).
Year	Apps	Goals
1948	1	0
Total	1	0
