= Mary Elizabeth Sharpe =

American architect

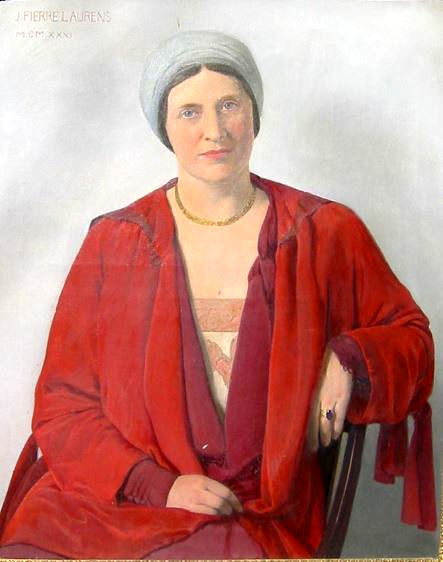
- Mary Elizabeth Sharpe; portrait by Jean-Pierre Laurens (1931)
- Born: Mary Elizabeth Evans; October 23, 1884; Syracuse, New York
- Died: April 4, 1985 (aged 100); Providence, Rhode Island
- Spouse: Henry Dexter Sharpe
- Children: Henry D. Sharpe Jr.

Mary Elizabeth Sharpe (née Evans; October 23, 1884 – April 4, 1985) was an American philanthropist, businesswoman, and self-taught landscape architect who is known for her work on Brown University's campus in Providence, Rhode Island. She became a prominent member of the Garden Club of America, created an annual tree fund, and worked on many landscaping projects.

== Biography ==
Sharpe was born in Syracuse, New York, on October 23, 1884, to William E. G. Evans and Fanny Elizabeth Evans. At a young age, Sharpe lost her father, and as a way to help her mother and three sisters, she began making candies to sell. At age 13, after selling candy to friends and townspeople, the knowledge of Sharpe's candy spread throughout the city as "Mary Elizabeth's Candy". The business grew, and she moved to New York and created a managing company, "Mary Elizabeth Ltd of New York", and two tea rooms in Boston and Newport.

At the start of World War I Mary Sharpe joined the US Food Administration and later joined the Red Cross in Paris to check over the U.S. Central Diet kitchen. During this time Sharpe also went on to write two books. One detailed her candy and chocolate recipes and techniques. The other was titled War time Recipes.

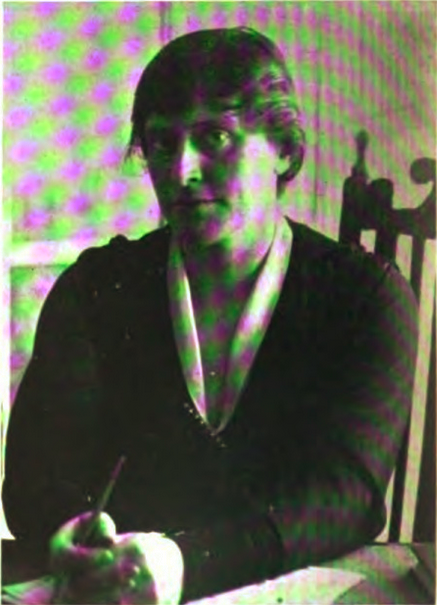
(1921)

After the war, Mary Sharpe returned home to her businesses, and in 1920, she married Henry Dexter Sharpe, a man she met on a horseback-riding trip out west before the war. They married and settled down in Providence, Rhode Island, near the Sharpe family's manufacturing company, Brown & Sharpe.

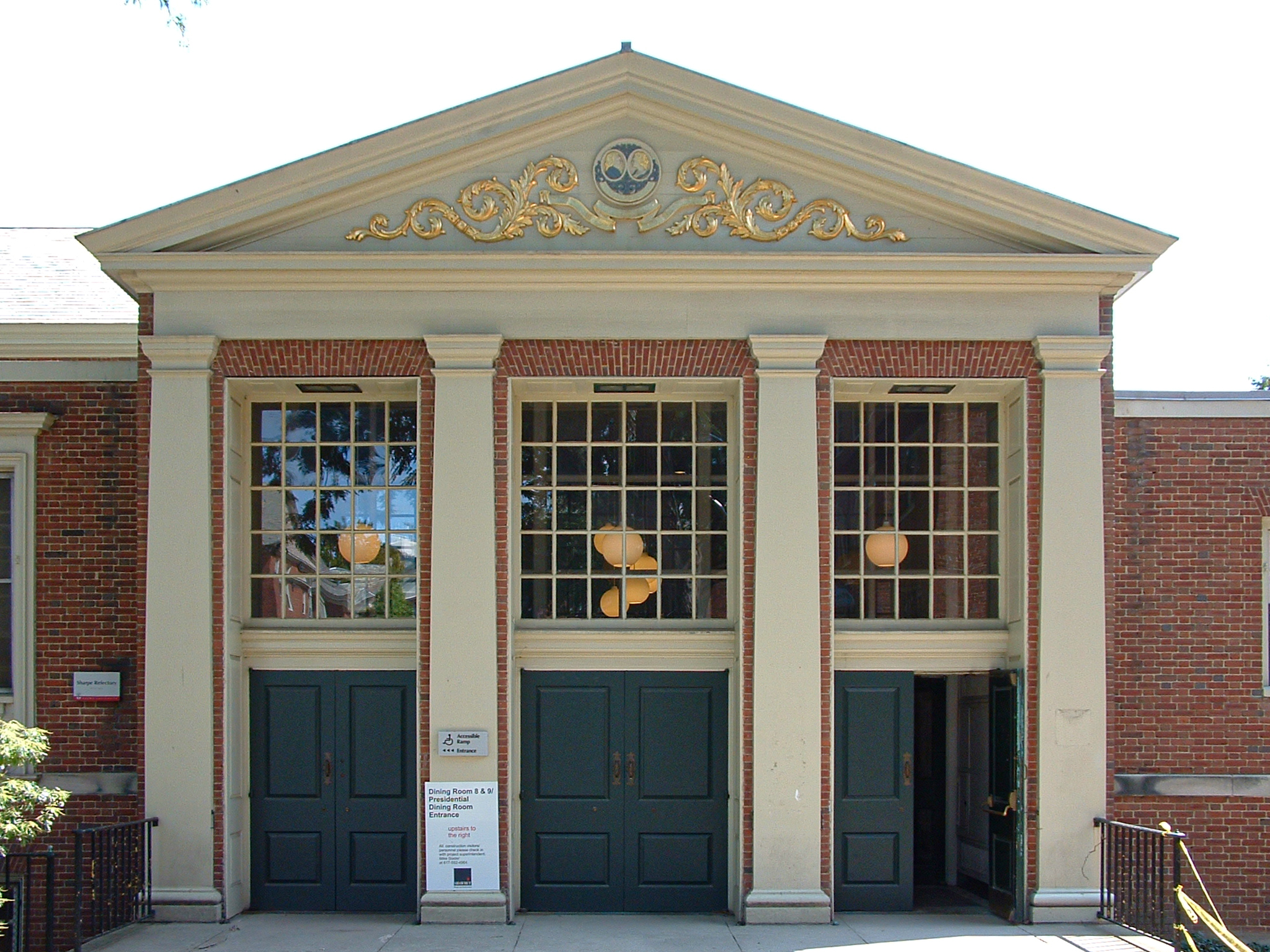
The Sharpe Refectory in Wriston Quad was named after Mary Elizabeth and Chancellor Henry D. Sharpe.

Settling down in Providence allowed Mary Sharpe to explore her interest in gardening. She closed her businesses in the mid-1930s and immersed herself in the culture of Providence. As her love of French culture grew, Henry and Mary built a French-style house at 84 Prospect Street which was later named the Rochambeau House. This building would later house Brown University's Department of Romance Languages.

In 1924, the couple had a son named Henry D. Sharpe Jr. who would grow up to take over the Brown & Sharpe business.

=== Achievements ===
In the 1940s, Mary Sharpe joined the Garden Club of America which allowed her to create an annual tree fund that successfully planted 3,000 new trees. She later also took on a job being the landscape architect for Brown University's campus.

She was also heavily involved in politics; she was a delegate to the Republican National Convention in 1928 and 1936 and Republican Elector in 1932. During the 1960s Sharpe successfully advocated for a waterfront park at India Point in Providence.

In the 1970s, she pledged $153,000 for the dilapidated waterfront in India Point Park and got the mayor to match her in funds to create a tree-lined park. Sharpe would continue to work on landscape projects like India Point Park and Brown University across Providence until she died on April 4, 1985.

== Awards and honors ==
In 2001, Mary Elizabeth Sharpe was inducted into the Rhode Island Heritage Hall of Fame for her contributions.
