= Hazen Hansard =

Canadian lawyer from Quebec

Hugh Gerard Hazen Hansard Q.C.

36th President of the Canadian Bar Association
- In office 1964–1965
- Preceded by: Oscar L. Lundell, QC
- Succeeded by: J.T. Weir, QC

Personal details
- Born: 1905 Quebec
- Died: April 30, 1985 (aged 80) Montreal
- Spouse: Marguerite Barry
- Children: Phillippa Verrier; Hugh Hansard
- Education: McGill Law School
- Profession: Lawyer

Military service
- Branch/service: Canadian Army
- Rank: 2nd Lieutenant
- Unit: Royal Canadian Artillery

Hugh Gerard Hazen Hansard, QC (1905 – April 30, 1985) was a Canadian lawyer from Quebec. A respected civil litigator, he appeared several times in the Supreme Court of Canada, and served as president of the Canadian Bar Association.

== Legal career ==
A graduate of McGill Law School, Hansard was called to the bar of Quebec in 1928. He originally was a member of the firm Montgomery, McMichael, Common & Howard in Montreal, and later with the firm of Cate, Ogilvy, Bishop, Cope, Porteous and Hansard.

In 1940, he enlisted with the Royal Canadian Artillery, 27th Field Battery, 2nd Montreal Regiment.

As Hansard's practice grew, he was appointed a director of several corporations, including Canadian Marconi Co. and Singer Co. of Canada.

== Supreme Court cases ==
In one of his Supreme Court cases, Christie v. York, Hansard acted for the owners of a bar at the Montreal Forum. The bar had refused service to Fred Christie, a black private chauffeur in Montreal, on the basis of his race. Christie sued the bar owners for damages. Hansard argued in the Supreme Court that the bar owners had an absolute right of liberty of contract under the civil law of Quebec, and therefore could decline to serve someone because of their race. In a 4-1 decision, the Supreme Court accepted Hansard's argument and ruled that the bar owners were not liable for refusing to serve Christie because of his race.

In another case, Reference Re: Offshore Mineral Rights, Hansard appeared for the Government of Newfoundland, arguing that the provinces owned the mineral rights found offshore, and denying that international law was relevant to determining the issue of ownership under Canadian constitutional law. The Court rejected the provincial arguments and held that the federal government had sole ownership of the offshore mineral rights.

== President of the Canadian Bar Association ==
Hansard was active in the Canadian Bar Association. In 1959, he was elected chairman of the Quebec Branch of the Association. In 1964, Hansard was elected to a one-year term as national president of the Canadian Bar Association.

During his term in office, he chaired a committee which called on the federal government to stiffen the criminal law relating to drinking and driving by making it an offence to drive with a blood alcohol level greater than 80 milligrams of alcohol in 100 millilitres of blood (0.08). Hansard acknowledged that some aspects of the proposal were intrusive, but his committee also proposed various procedural safeguards, to balance the public's right to safety on the road against the right of the individual driver to be able to make full answer and defence. The proposals from the Canadian Bar Association were very similar to the final offences and procedural safeguards introduced into Parliament.

In 1965, towards the end of his term, Hansard spoke on Quebec separatism, arguing that it was being blown out of proportion by its advocates, which the press was picking up on. He also attended a meeting of the American Bar Association and called for the American lawyers to introduce a new approach to the Fifth Amendment, to make it easier to require witnesses in criminal cases to testify, while protecting their right against self-incrimination in future cases.

== Later life and death ==
A year after his term ended as President of the Canadian Bar Association, Hansard was in New Zealand and attended to a reception for international legal dignitaries. The hostess for the event intentionally poisoned the guests by lacing the food with arsenic. Hansard was taken ill but survived. The eleven-year-old son of a fellow guest died from the food, and the hostess later committed suicide by eating an arsenic-laced sandwich.

Hansard died in Montreal on April 30, 1985.
