= John Richardson (Yorkshire cricketer) =

English cricketer

John Allan Richardson (4 August 1908 – 2 April 1985) was an English amateur first-class cricketer, who played seven matches for Yorkshire County Cricket Club between 1936 and 1947, and once for the Gentlemen v Players in 1934. He also played for the Yorkshire Second XI from 1930 to 1937.

Born in Sleights, near Whitby, Yorkshire, England, Richardson was a right-hand batsman, who scored 343 runs, with a best score of 61 against the Marylebone Cricket Club (MCC), at an average of 31.18, and took four catches. He also scored 54 not out against Sussex. He took two wickets with his off breaks, at an average of 54.00, both scalps coming against the RAF.

He was one of the most gifted amateurs ever to assist Yorkshire, and had he been able to spare time to play cricket regularly, he might have made a name for himself in the first-class game. Richardson was an auctioneer and farmer by profession. A tall, powerfully built batsman, with a penchant for the drive, he scored six consecutive centuries for Scarborough C.C. in 1938, and captained the club for twenty four years up to 1959. Having been in the first team for thirty two years, Richardson scored 18,900 runs for Scarborough, at an average of 45.99.

He died in April 1985 in Scarborough, Yorkshire.
