= Star Model S =

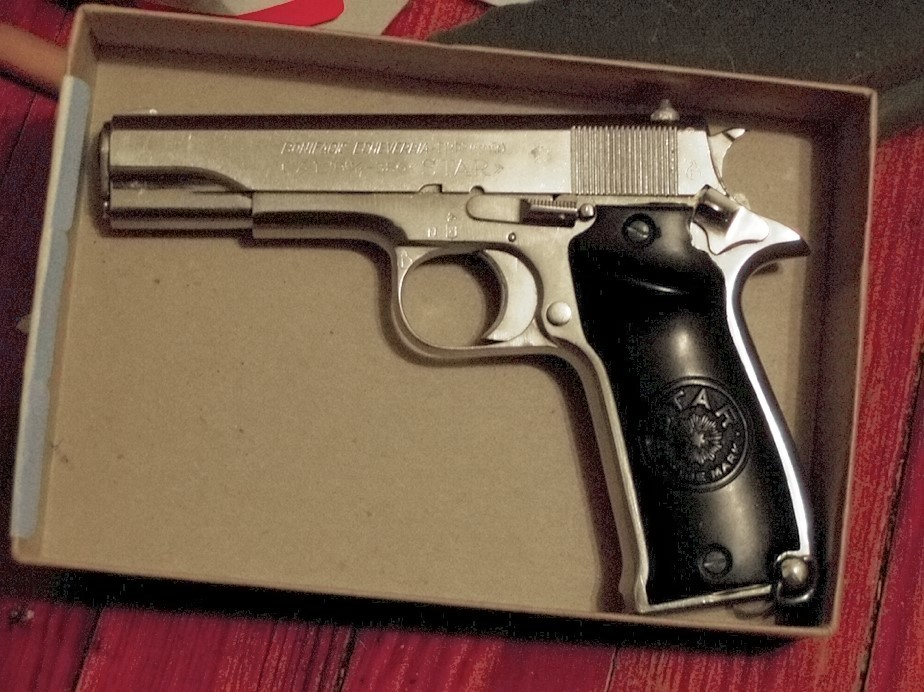
Star Model S 380

The Star Model S was a Spanish semi-automatic pistol manufactured by Star Bonifacio Echeverria, S.A. and designed to use the .380 ACP cartridge. Like many semi-automatic handguns, the basic design of the Star Model S is based on the .45 calibre Colt 1911. But it is much smaller, lighter, and lacks some of the safety features of the Colt pistol. It is this lightness and lack of safety features that make this a fast gun.

At one time the Star Model S was the official sidearm of the Spanish Foreign Legion. The Star Model S was imported into the United States by the Interarms company of Alexandria, Virginia. Interarms went out of business in early 1990s at about the same time the Star company went out of business. The Star Model S is no longer manufactured.

== See also ==
- List of firearms
