= Stephen P. Duggan =

American scholar and educator (1870–1950)

- Born: Stephen Pierce Hayden Duggan; December 20, 1870; New York City, New York, U.S.
- Died: August 18, 1950 (aged 79); Stamford, Connecticut, U.S.
- Known for: Internationalism
- Spouse: Sarah Alice Elsesser
- Children: Laurence Duggan

Academic background
- Education: College of the City of New York, Columbia University

Stephen Pierce Hayden Duggan (December 20, 1870 – August 18, 1950) was an American scholar and educator known as the "apostle of internationalism".

== Biography ==
Duggan was educated at the College of the City of New York (CCNY) where, after completing his undergraduate and some graduate work in 1896, he began teaching while pursuing graduate studies at Columbia University, where he received a Ph.D. in 1902. He was a professor of diplomatic history and later the history of education at CCNY, and became head of the education department in 1906.

Duggan founded The Institute of International Education in 1919, together with Nobel Laureates Elihu Root and Nicholas Murray Butler, and was the first director, serving until 1946. He was a director of the Council on Foreign Relations during 1921–1950.

Duggan was married to Sarah Alice Elsesser, who was a director of the Negro Welfare League of White Plains, New York.

Their son Laurence Duggan (1905–1948) was an economist and State Department official who was suspected of being a Soviet agent.

== Works ==
- The Eastern Question: A Study in Diplomacy (1902)
- A Student's Textbook in the History of Education (1916)
- The League of Nations: The Principle and the Practice (1919)

== Sources ==
- E. C. Condon (1978). "Duggan, Stephen Pierce". In John F. Ohles (ed.). Biographical Dictionary of American Educators. Vol. 1. Greenwood Publishing Group. pp. 402–403. ISBN 9780313040122.
