= Jack Horsell =

Australian cricketer (1914–1985)

Personal information
- Born: 12 July 1914; Stepney, South Australia
- Died: 20 April 1985 (aged 70); Sydney, Australia
- Source: Cricinfo, 9 August 2020

Jack Horsell (12 July 1914 – 20 April 1985) was an Australian cricketer. He played in two first-class matches for South Australia between 1937 and 1939.

== See also ==
- List of South Australian representative cricketers
