= Scoop Usher =

American politician

Robert L. "Scoop" Usher (December 6, 1913 – April 20, 1985) was a Democratic politician who served in the Missouri House of Representatives. Born in Hannibal, Missouri, he was elected to the Missouri House of Representatives on December 28, 1973, in a special election. Usher had previously served as a Missouri State Highway Patrol Officer. He was first-runner up in 1957, 1958, and 1959 as national champion pistol shooter. He also played semi-professional basketball.
