= Institute of International Education =

American nonprofit organization

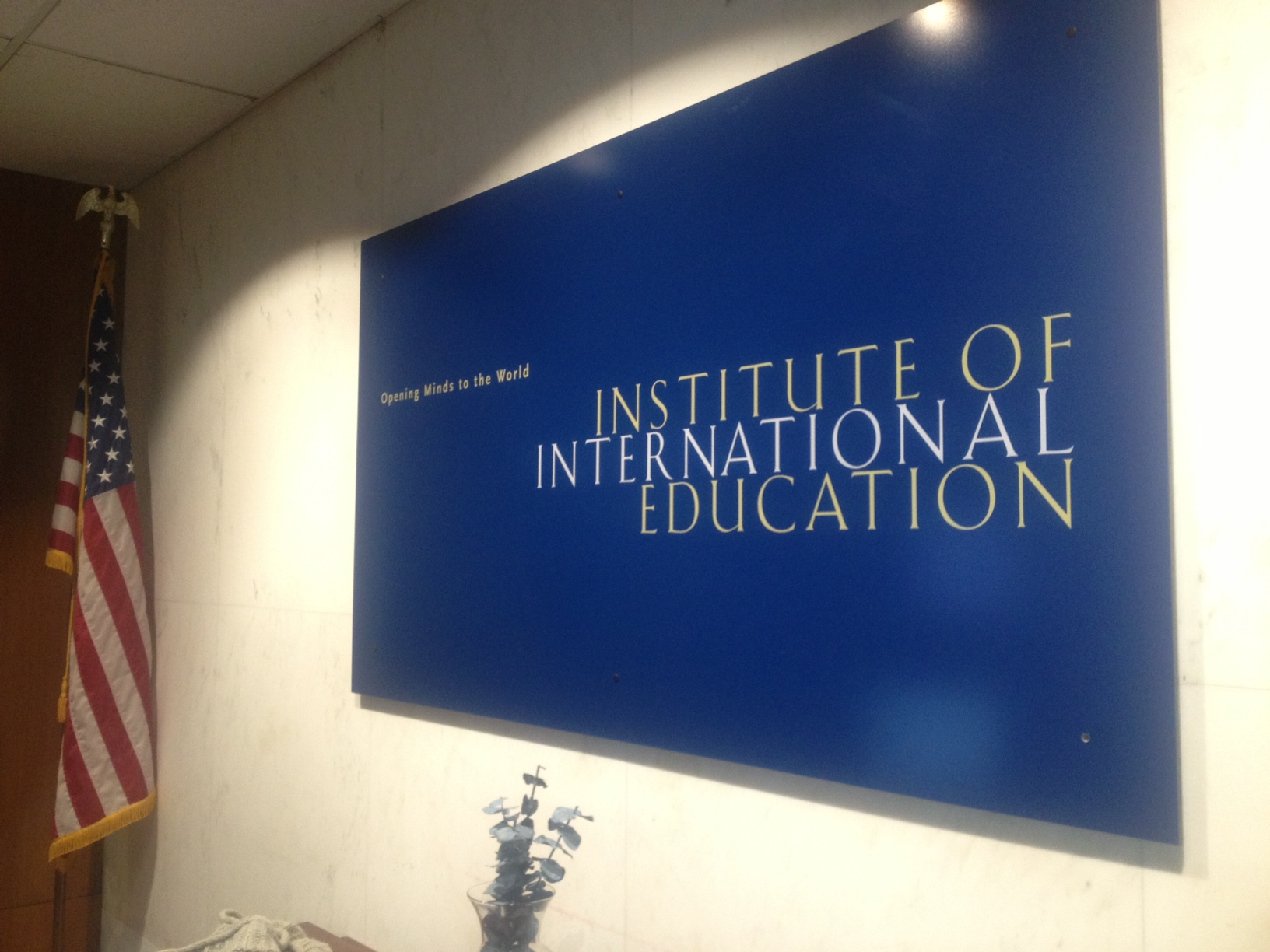
- Founded: 1919; 107 years ago
- Founder: Nicholas Murray Butler; Elihu Root; Stephen P. Duggan
- Type: Charitable organization 501(c)(3) non-profit
- Purpose: International student exchange and aid; foreign affairs; international peace and security
- Location: New York City, U.S.
- Region served: Worldwide
- Method: Endowment fund; financial services; fundraising
- CEO: Jason Czyz
- Income: $592,227,753 USD (2016)
- Expenses: $593,244,786 USD (2016)
- Website: www.iie.org

The Institute of International Education (IIE) is an American 501(c) non-profit organization that focuses on international student exchange and aid, foreign affairs, and international peace and security. IIE creates programs of study and training for students, educators, and professionals from various sectors. The organization says its mission is to "build more peaceful and equitable societies by advancing scholarship, building economies, and promoting access to opportunity".

== History ==
The institute was established in 1919 at the cessation of World War I. Nobel Peace Prize winners Nicholas Murray Butler, president of Columbia University; Elihu Root, former Secretary of State; and Stephen P. Duggan, professor of political science at the College of the City of New York formed the Institute of International Education (IIE) with the idea that educational exchange would incite understanding between nations.

Stephen Duggan, the first IIE president, influenced the U.S. government to create a new category of non-immigrant student visas, bypassing post-war quotas set by the Immigration Act of 1921. In the 1930s, IIE began expanding its activities beyond Europe, opening the first exchanges with the Soviet Union and Latin America. Edna Duge was director of the IIE's Latin America department in the 1940s. After World War II, the institute facilitated the establishment of the National Association of Foreign Student Advisers (NAFSA) and the Council on International Educational Exchange (CIEE). In the 1940s, IIE aided more than 4,000 U.S. students to study and work on reconstruction projects at European universities devastated by the war.

By the 1950s, the number of foreign students to the United States nearly doubled. As a result, the institute formed a network of U.S. offices to serve the growing number of students under its administration. IIE began producing an annual statistical analysis of the foreign student population in the United States and named the study "Open Doors". In the 1960s, the institute opened overseas offices in Asia, Africa, and Latin America.

In 1979, the IIE joined the White House and the United States Information Agency (USIA) to develop the innovative Hubert H. Humphrey North-South Fellowships, which brings mid-career professionals in public service fields from developing countries and East Central Europe to the U.S. for a year of academic study and practical professional experience. The "International Education Information Center" opened at IIE's New York headquarters in the 1980s and new offices in Budapest and Hanoi were established in the 90s.

In 2008, IIE president Allan Goodman led the institute's first U.S. higher education delegation. Eleven delegates representing seven U.S. colleges and universities traveled to Southeast Asia to enhance and expand linkages with institutions in Thailand, Vietnam, and Indonesia. IIE has since led U.S. higher education delegations to countries such as Brazil, China, Indonesia, India, Myanmar, and Russia with the aim of expanding educational ties with the United States. In the 2010s, the institute established the IIE Centers of Excellence and launched the Emergency Student Fund (ESF). In 2011, IIE hosted the first in a series of conferences in Iraq designed to engage key stakeholders in advancing higher education discussions and development efforts in Iraq.

In 2012, IIE began administering the government of Brazil's Scientific Mobility Program, which provides scholarships to Brazilian undergraduate students primarily in the science, technology, engineering, and mathematics (STEM) fields. IIE brought together delegates from 15 countries and the European Union (EU) in Washington, D.C., for the 2012 International Education Summit on the Occasion of the G8, to discuss national priorities and educational cooperation among nations.

In 2024, it was designated as an "undesirable organization" by the Russian authorities. In March 2025, IIE announced that it did not receive funding for the Benjamin A. Gilman International Scholarship program or Fulbright Program.

== Operations ==
IIE is governed by a board of trustees with input from advisory bodies and executive staff. As of March 2026, the IIE is led by president and CEO Jason Czyz.

IIE governs more than 200+ programs serving more than 27,000 people from 185 nations each year. The focal point of the programs includes Fellowship and Scholarship Management, Higher Education Institutional Development, Emergency Student and Scholar Assistance, Leadership Development, and International Development. The programs involve participation in the US and abroad.

IIE headquarters are located in New York City; regional offices are located in Washington D.C., Chicago, Denver, Houston, and San Francisco in the United States. IIE's global network is composed of 18 offices and affiliates, 600+ staff, and 1,600 higher education partners worldwide. Each office networks local colleges, universities, and NGOs to administer regional programs as well as ensure the goals of sponsors are fulfilled. IIE also administers 14 Regional Educational Advising Coordinators (REACs) who provide training, resources, and mentoring to support the U.S. Department of State's network of EducationUSA advisers. Current REACs are located in the following cities around the world: Lima, Mexico City, Rio de Janeiro, Budapest, Kyiv, Bratislava, Amman, Accra, Johannesburg, Lahore, Delhi, Beijing, Tokyo, and Kuala Lumpur.

IIE conducts applied research and policy analysis in the field of international student mobility. Through research and program evaluations, IIE provides advising and counseling on international education and opportunities abroad. IIE's publications, reports, and policy papers also provide resources for students and advisers, domestic and international governmental agencies, non-governmental organizations, and foundations. Some of IIE's research projects include Open Doors, Project Atlas, and the Global Education Research Reports.

In 2016, IIE reported revenue of $592,227,753, expenses of $593,244,786, and assets of $141,678,650.

In 2017, Charity Navigator gave the organization a score of 89.86.

== See also ==
- Edgar J. Kaufmann Conference Center, located within the IIE's former New York City offices
