= Geoffrey Loney =

Australian cricketer

Personal information
- Full name: Geoffrey Souter Loney
- Born: 31 March 1894; Campbelltown, New South Wales, Australia
- Died: 7 April 1985 (aged 91); Hobart, Tasmania, Australia
- Batting: Right-handed
- Bowling: Right-arm offbreak

Domestic team information
- Years: Team
- 1922/23: Tasmania
- Source: Cricinfo, 24 January 2016

Geoffrey Souter Loney MM (31 March 1894 – 7 April 1985) was an Australian cricketer. He played one first-class match for Tasmania during the 1922–23 season. During World War I he was awarded the Military Medal whilst serving in the Australian Army.

Born at Campbelltown in New South Wales, Loney was educated at Sydney Grammar School between 1904 and 1910, the family having moved to live at Randwick in Sydney. He was member of the school's cadet force, played age-group cricket for Randwick Cricket Club, and played for Sydney Grammar Old Boys. After leaving school he worked as clerk and spent five years in the Naval Reserve.

Loney enlisted in the 19th Battalion of the Australian Imperial Force in May 1915. He embarked for Europe in December, joining the 4th Battalion in Alexandria where it had been based following its evacuation at the end of the Gallipoli Campaign. He was promoted to the rank of lance-corporal in February 1916 and embarked for France in March, serving on the Western Front. He was wounded in August, a shell splinter puncturing his lung whilst serving at Pozieres. He was evacuated to England, recovering from his wounds at the Norfolk War Hospital at Thorpe St Andrew before recuperating at Perham Down in Wiltshire.

Loney rejoined his unit in mid-1917, and was promoted to corporal in October before being wounded again in November, not rejoining the battalion until January 1918. In March he was court martialled after having been absent without leave in Paris and reduced to the rank of private, although he was swiftly promoted again, reaching the rank of sergeant by July 1918. The battalion was involved in the Hundred Days Offensive during the late summer of 1918, and saw action at the Battle of Albert, the Australians capturing the village of Chuignes on 23 August. During the battle, Loney took charge of his platoon following the loss of its commanding officer. He coordinated fire on German machine gun positions and led the platoon in its advance to capture the German positions. He was awarded the Military Medal for his bravery, the commendation praising his "great coolness and judgement" and that the "courage and devotion to duty" he displayed were "of great value to his unit".

After demobilisation in early 1919, Loney moved to Tasmania, eventually moving to Mangalore. He played club cricket for the Break of Day and North West teams in Hobart and after moving to Mangalore, for Bagdad. Described as "a very useful all-rounder" who "always manages ... to do something sensational", who was a "good field, good sport and always a great trier", his only first-class match came against Victoria in February 1923 at the Melbourne Cricket Ground. He made scores of 12 and 18 runs and took one wicket. He also played a number of times for the South of Tasmania against the North of Tasmania in non-first-class matches.

During World War II Loney, who farmed at Mangalore, enlisted in the Volunteer Defence Corps. He died at Hobart in 1985, aged 91. In 2013 his son donated LOney's wartime diaries and medals to Sydney Grammar School.
