= György Kósa =

Hungarian composer (1897–1984)

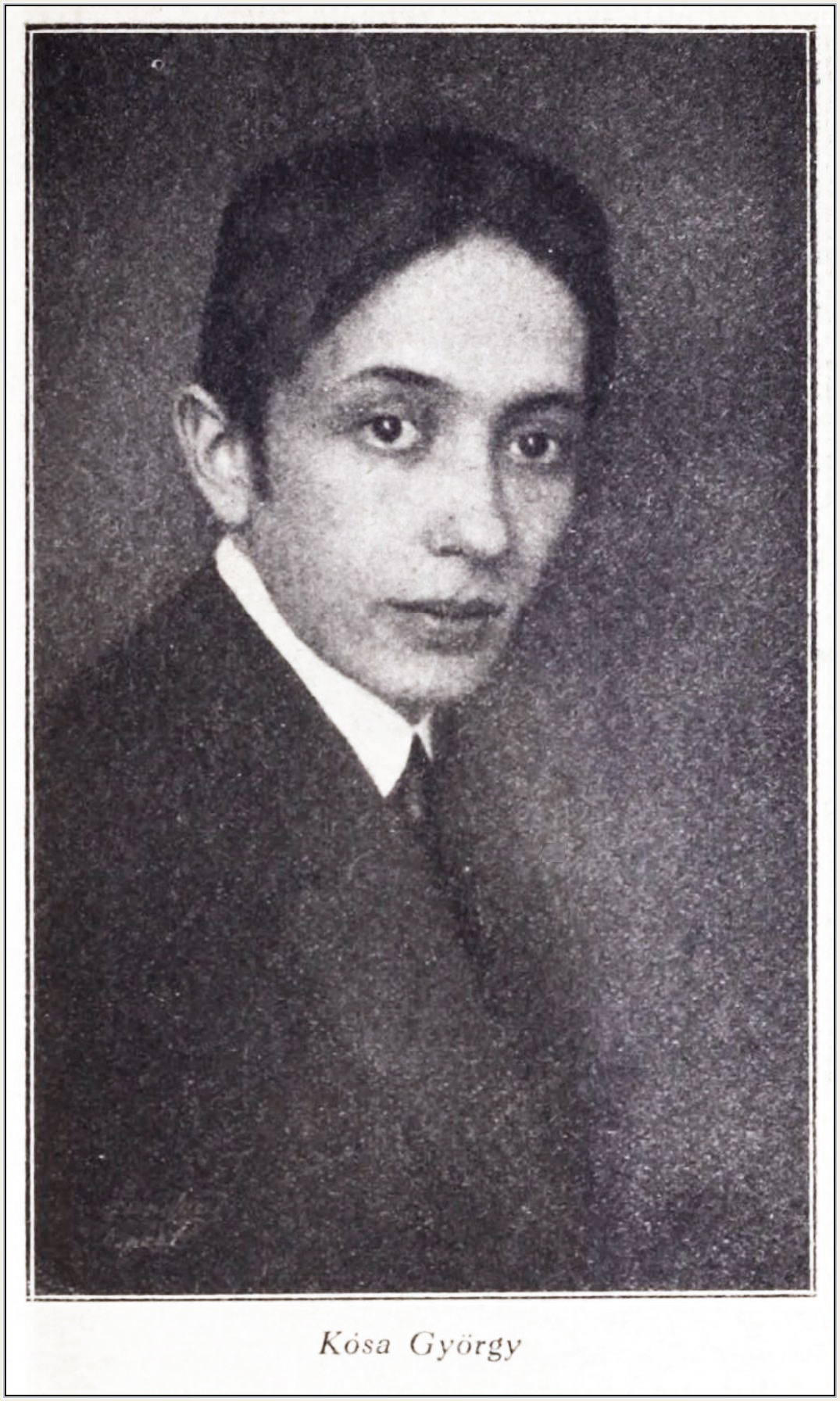
György Kósa in 1927

György Kósa (24 April 1897 – 16 August 1984) was a Hungarian composer.

== Life and career ==
György Kósa was born in Budapest, Hungary on 24 April 1897. He began studying music with Béla Bartók when he was ten years old. From 1908-1912 he attended the Franz Liszt Academy of Music where he was a student of music composition with Zoltán Kodály, and Victor von Herzfeld. He also studied piano at that conservatory from 1908 through 1915, and later was a piano student of Ernst von Dohnányi in 1915-1916.

Kósa worked at the Hungarian State Opera as a répétiteur in 1916-1917; notably serving in that capacity for the premiere production of Bartok's opera The Wooden Prince (1917). After World War I, he gave tours of Europe and North Africa before ultimately settling in Tripoli, Libya where he worked as a pit orchestra conductor in the city's theaters for two years. He returned to Hungary, and in 1927 joined the faculty of his alma mater, the Franz Liszt Academy of Music, as a professor of piano. He taught there for many years.

Kósa was awarded the Ferenc Erkel Prize in (1955), and was later honored by the Hungarian People’s Republic as a Merited Artist and a Honoured Artist in 1972.

Kósa died in Budapest on 16 August 1984.

== Compositions ==
He composed nine operas, four ballets, and incidental music for four pantomimes, as well as nine symphonies, one orchestral suite, chamber music, eleven oratorios, several cantatas, one mass, one setting of the Dies Irae, two requiems, and lieder.

His chamber works include: a string trio, a cello sonata (1965), a sonatina for cello solo (1928), a string quartet entitled "Self-portrait" (1920), a second quartet (1929), In memoriam... for solo viola (1977), a duo for violin and viola (1943), and twelve miniatures for a harp trio (1965).
