= Bennie Lunn =

Australian rules footballer, born 1905

Personal information
- Full name: Benjamin Frederick Lunn
- Born: 11 June 1905; Richmond, Victoria
- Died: 25 April 1985 (aged 79); Caulfield South, Victoria
- Height: 178 cm (5 ft 10 in)
- Weight: 76 kg (168 lb)

Playing career^{1}
Years	Club	Games (Goals)
1925–1926	Richmond	14 (0)
1927	Rosedale	
1928–1929	Richmond	14 (0)
1930	Hawthorn	10 (0)
1931–1935	Sandringham (VFA)	66 (3)
- ^{1} Playing statistics correct to the end of 1935.

Benjamin Frederick Lunn (11 June 1905 – 25 April 1985) was an Australian rules footballer who played for the Richmond Football Club and Hawthorn Football Club in the Victorian Football League (VFL).

== Early life ==
The eldest child of Benjamin Thomas Lunn (1879–1920) and May Wilson (1880–1934), Benjamin Frederick Lunn was born at Richmond on 11 June 1905.

== Football ==
=== Richmond Juniors ===
A defender, Lunn played with the Richmond Juniors team from 1921-1924.

=== Richmond (VFL) ===
Lunn spent four years with Richmond, but struggled to hold down a regular place in the senior team, playing 28 senior games and 57 reserves games in his time at Punt Rd.

=== Rosedale ===
Lunn was captain-coach of the Rosedale Football Club in the Gippsland Football League in 1927 and won the GFL best and fairest, Jensen Award.

=== Hawthorn (VFL) ===
Lunn transferred to Hawthorn at the start of the 1930 season and after playing in the first five rounds again found himself in and out of the side for the rest of the season including serving a four week suspension, finishing with a total of 10 games.

=== Sandringham (VFA) ===
Lunn next moved to Sandringham in the Victorian Football Association, where he played consistently through the 1931-34 seasons. He was regarded as one of the VFA’s leading full backs during that period.

== Cricket ==
Lunn was a batsman and played District Cricket with Richmond in the 1925-26 season, playing 9 games and scoring a total of 93 runs.

== Later life ==
Lunn worked as a public servant for many years and was awarded an Imperial Service Medal for his work as a Senior Inspector – Victoria Works in 1971.

Lunn died at Caulfield South on 25 April 1985 and is buried with his wife at Burwood Cemetery.
