= Fred Stammers =

Australian rules footballer, born 1918

Personal information
- Full name: Fred Stammers
- Born: 25 December 1918
- Died: 14 April 1985 (aged 66)
- Original team: Sandringham
- Height: 180 cm (5 ft 11 in)
- Weight: 81 kg (179 lb)

Playing career^{1}
| Years | Club | Games (Goals) |
| 1943 | Richmond | 1 (0) |
- ^{1} Playing statistics correct to the end of 1943.

Fred Stammers (25 December 1918 – 14 April 1985) was a former Australian rules footballer who played with Richmond in the Victorian Football League (VFL).
