= Josef Emanuel Hilscher =

Austrian soldier, poet and translator

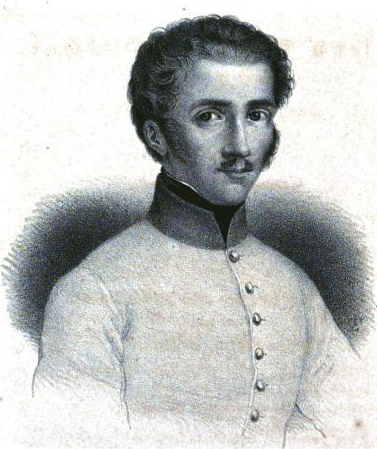
Josef Emanuel Hilscher

Josef Emanuel Hilscher (22 January 1806 – 2 November 1837) was an Austrian soldier, poet and translator of others' poetry. He became a soldier, and rose to quartermaster, but he is remembered for his own exuberant poems, and highly regarded translations into German of Byron's poems. Hilscher's poems were published after his death by fellow Austrian poet Ludwig Frankl (1810–1894) as editor of 'Oesterreichisches Morgenblatt'.
