= Jack Cutting (footballer) =

English footballer

Personal information
- Full name: John Andrew Cutting
- Date of birth: 15 April 1924
- Place of birth: Fleetwood, England
- Date of death: 24 April 1985 (aged 61)
- Place of death: Fleetwood, England
- Position: Inside forward

Senior career*
Years	Team	Apps	(Gls)
1946–1947	Oldham Athletic	4	(1)
1947–1948	Fleetwood		
1948–1949	Accrington Stanley	23	(5)
1950–1951	Fleetwood		
Total		27	(1)
- * Club domestic league appearances and goals

John Andrew Cutting (15 April 1924 – 24 April 1985) was an English professional footballer who played as an inside forward in the Football League.

== Sources ==
- Hugman, Barry (2005). The PFA Premier and Football League Players' Records 1946-2005. Queen Anne Press.
