= Elvin Barr =

Australian rules footballer, born 1908

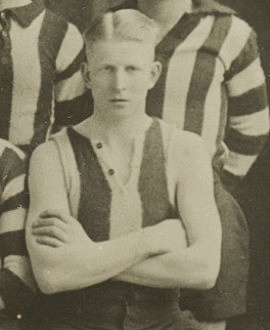

Personal information
- Full name: Elvin Arnott Barr
- Born: 5 November 1908; Romsey, Victoria
- Died: 14 April 1985 (aged 76)
- Original team: Tooronga
- Height: 179 cm (5 ft 10 in)
- Weight: 73 kg (161 lb)

Playing career^{1}
Years	Club	Games (Goals)
1930, 1932	Collingwood	9 (3)
- ^{1} Playing statistics correct to the end of 1932.

Elvin Barr (5 November 1908 – 14 April 1985) was a former Australian rules footballer who played with Collingwood in the Victorian Football League (VFL).
