= Maria Stencel =

Polish nurse (1900–1985)

- Born: 11 January 1900; Jekaterynosław
- Died: April 6, 1985 (aged 85); Łódź, Poland
- Occupation: Nurse
- Known for: Florence Nightingale Medal

Maria Irene Stencel (11 January 1900 – 6 April 1985) was a registered nurse from Poland who was a recipient of the International Florence Nightingale Medal in 1961.

== Early life ==
Stencel was born on 11 January 1900, in Jekaterynosław (now Dnipro, Ukraine).

== Career in nursing ==
Stencel worked in a military hospital as the head of the auxiliary nurses of the Polish Red Cross from 1930 to 1939. She then became director of emergency services. Stencel took the position of Director of the School of Nursing at Łódź, Poland, in 1946.

During World War Two, Stencel organised relief to nurses who were threatened with deportation from Poland.

Stencel was one of the founders of the Polish Nursing Association, Lodz Branch, that was established in November 1956.

== Death ==
Stencel died on 6 April 1985, in Łódź.
