= Henriëtte van den Brandeler =

Dutch composer

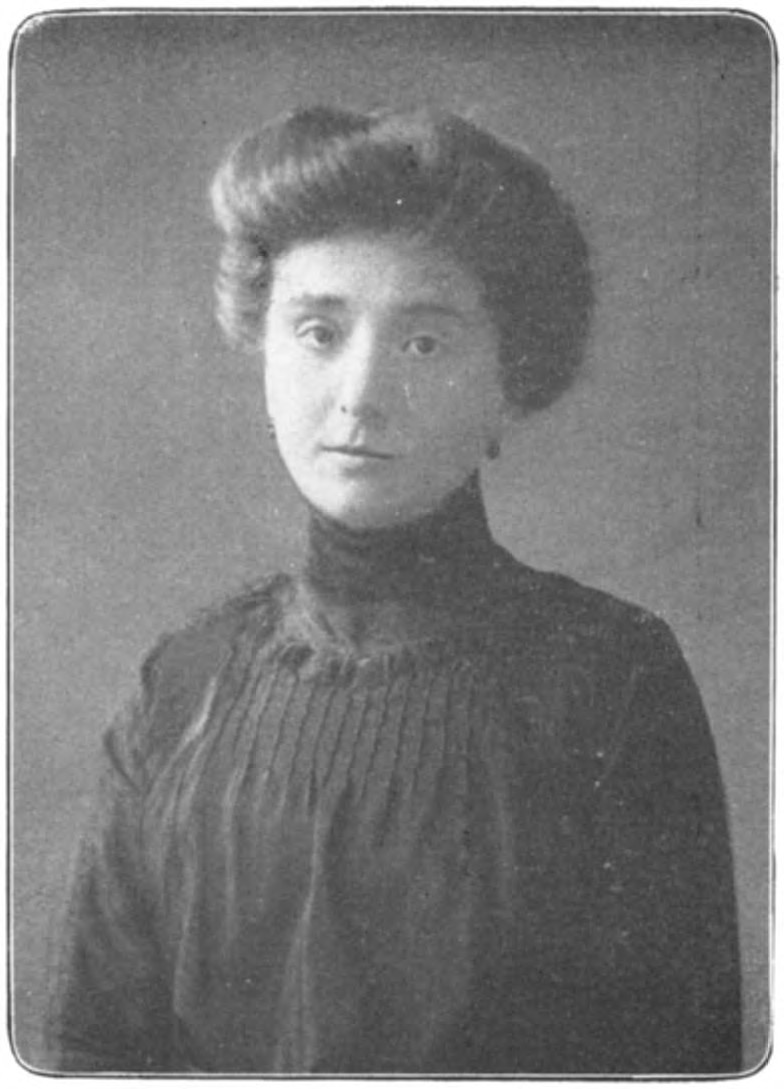
- Born: Hendrika Jacoba van den Brandeler; September 25, 1884; The Hague
- Died: April 11, 1985 (aged 100); Baarn
- Occupation: Composer
- Spouse: George van Heukelom

Hendrika Jacoba van den Brandeler (25 September 1884 – 11 April 1985) was a Dutch composer.

== Life ==
Henriëtte van den Brandeler was born in The Hague into the family of the lieutenant Louis Christiaan van den Brandeler and Christina Petronella Greve. In 1914 she became the second wife of the architect George van Heukelom, who later became, among other things, president of the Utrecht Symphony Orchestra.

She took piano lessons from Johan Wagenaar at the music school of the Society for the Advancement of Music (Maatschappij ter Bevordering der Toonkunst) in Utrecht. After moving to The Hague, she continued her piano lessons. Having already composed several songs and works for piano and female choir, she took composition lessons with Bernard Zweers in Amsterdam, Dirk Schäfer and, around 1912, Walter Braunfels in Munich.

She died in Baarn on 11 April 1985. In 2016 a bridge in the Beatrixpark in Amsterdam-Zuid was named after her.

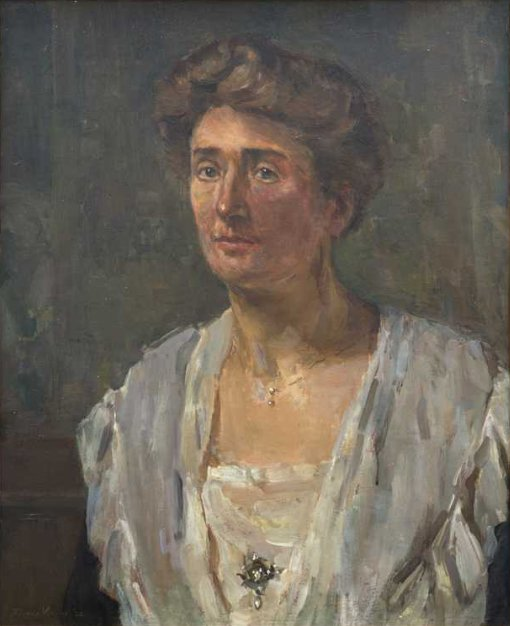
Portrait by Dutch painter Floris Verster

== Works ==
Three of her songs (Opus 2) first appeared in print in 1906. Shortly afterwards, the Algemeene Muziekhandel in Amsterdam published a collection of five of her songs. In May 1908 she contacted the music publisher A.A. Noske for the first time. Seven songs were published that same year and three more in 1910. She also composed:

- a requiem for her deceased father who died in 1911, which was performed in Naarden under the direction of Johan Schoonderbeek.
- a Stabat Mater, performed in Naarden on 28 June 1913 by the Concertgebouw Orchestra conducted by the Schoonderbeek with Thom Denijs, Pauline de Haan-Manifarges, Aaltje Noordewier-Reddingius and Georg Walter.
- Missa Gaudete in Domino.

After her wedding in 1914, she devoted herself to family life. She wrote a biography of her husband: Dr Ir. G.W. van Heukelom, de ingenieur, de bouwmeester, de mens, published in 1954.
