= Michael Blees =

Australian rules footballer

Personal information
- Full name: Michael Blees
- Born: 6 August 1962
- Died: 7 April 1985 (aged 22)
- Original team: Frankston Bombers
- Height: 191 cm (6 ft 3 in)
- Weight: 83 kg (183 lb)
- Position: Ruckman

Playing career^{1}
Years	Club	Games (Goals)
1981–1983	St Kilda	14 (4)
- ^{1} Playing statistics correct to the end of 1983.

Michael Blees (6 August 1962 – 7 April 1985) was an Australian rules footballer who represented the St Kilda Football Club in the Victorian Football League (VFL) during the 1980s.

Blees joined the club from Kananook and made his senior debut in the last game of 1981 against Footscray. The following season he played 10 senior games. Three more games in 1983 before acquiring an illness in February 1984. Fourteen months later he died leaving behind a grieving widow.
