= Yelena Lyubimova =

Russian geologist

Yelena Aleksandrovna Lyubimova (Russian: Елена Александровна Любимова; 1925 – 22 April 1985) was a Soviet geologist known for her geothermal research and as one of the first women geophysicists from the Soviet Union to conduct research in the Atlantic Ocean. She spent her thirty-five year career entirely at the Geophysical Institute (now the Institute of Earth Physics). She is known for co-founding the International Committee for Heat Flow, of which she was president from 1971 to 1979. She was also vice-president of the Scientific Council for Geothermal Research.

== Early life and education ==
Lyubimova was born in Moscow in 1925. She attended Moscow State University, where she studied physics under Andrey Nikolayevich Tikhonov and Otto Schmidt. She earned her degrees in 1955 and 1966. Tikhonov was known to consider her one of his most capable students.

== Career and research ==
Lyubimova's entire career was spent at the Geophysical Institute, now the Institute of Earth Physics. Her research included studies of heat exchange in the Earth's interior, the evolution of the Earth and Moon, subduction and spreading zones in the Kola trench, heat flow along continents and oceans in the Arctic, heat flow anomalies, and electroconductivity. She was a founder of the International Committee for Heat Flow, gaining international recognition, and coordinated a major project to map heat flow in the lithosphere. She was president of the committee from 1971 to 1979.

Lyubimova was one of the first Soviet women geophysicists to participate in scientific expeditions in the Atlantic.

== Death ==
Lyubimova died in on the 22 April 1985.

== Honors and awards ==
- President, International Committee for Heat Flow (1971–1979)
- Vice-president, Scientific Council for Geothermal Research

== Papers ==
- Elena Aleksandrovna Lubimova (1925–1985) // Geothermics. 1986. Vol. 15. N 1. P. 1–2.
