= Georg von Boisman =

Swedish modern pentathlete

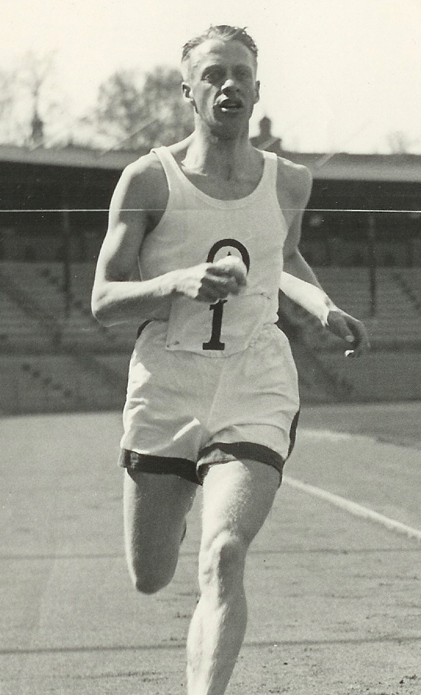

Personal information
- Born: 10 August 1910 Umeå, Sweden
- Died: 4 April 1985 (aged 74) Borensberg, Sweden

Sport
- Sport: Modern pentathlon
- Club: I4 IF, Linköping

Georg Tage Eugen von Boisman (12 August 1910 – 4 April 1985) was a Swedish modern pentathlete. He competed at the 1936 Summer Olympics and finished tenth.
