= Hanon Izakson =

Hanon Ilyich Izakson (Russian: Изаксон, Ханон Ильич) (March 15, 1909 – April 4, 1985) was a Soviet designer of farm machines who was born in Novo-Bereslav, Kherson Oblast.

In 1932, Izakson graduated from Zaporizhia Engineering College. He worked at the 'Communar' factory, progressing from a designer to chief designer, later becoming the chief designer for self-propelled combine harvesters at Tula Design Bureau. Since 1953, Izakson headed the General Design Bureau for self-propelled combine harvesters in the city of Taganrog. Under his direction, several grain-harvesting machines and other agricultural machines were developed for various climate zones of the USSR.

Izakson has received over 100 patents for inventions, most of which have been introduced into mass production. In addition, he has been awarded with several Order of Lenin, Order of the October Revolution, and Order of the Red Banner of Labour awards and medals. He was a candidate of technical sciences in 1971 and received the Lenin Prize in 1964.

Izakson died in the city of Taganrog on April 4, 1985.
