= Ramavtar Tyagi =

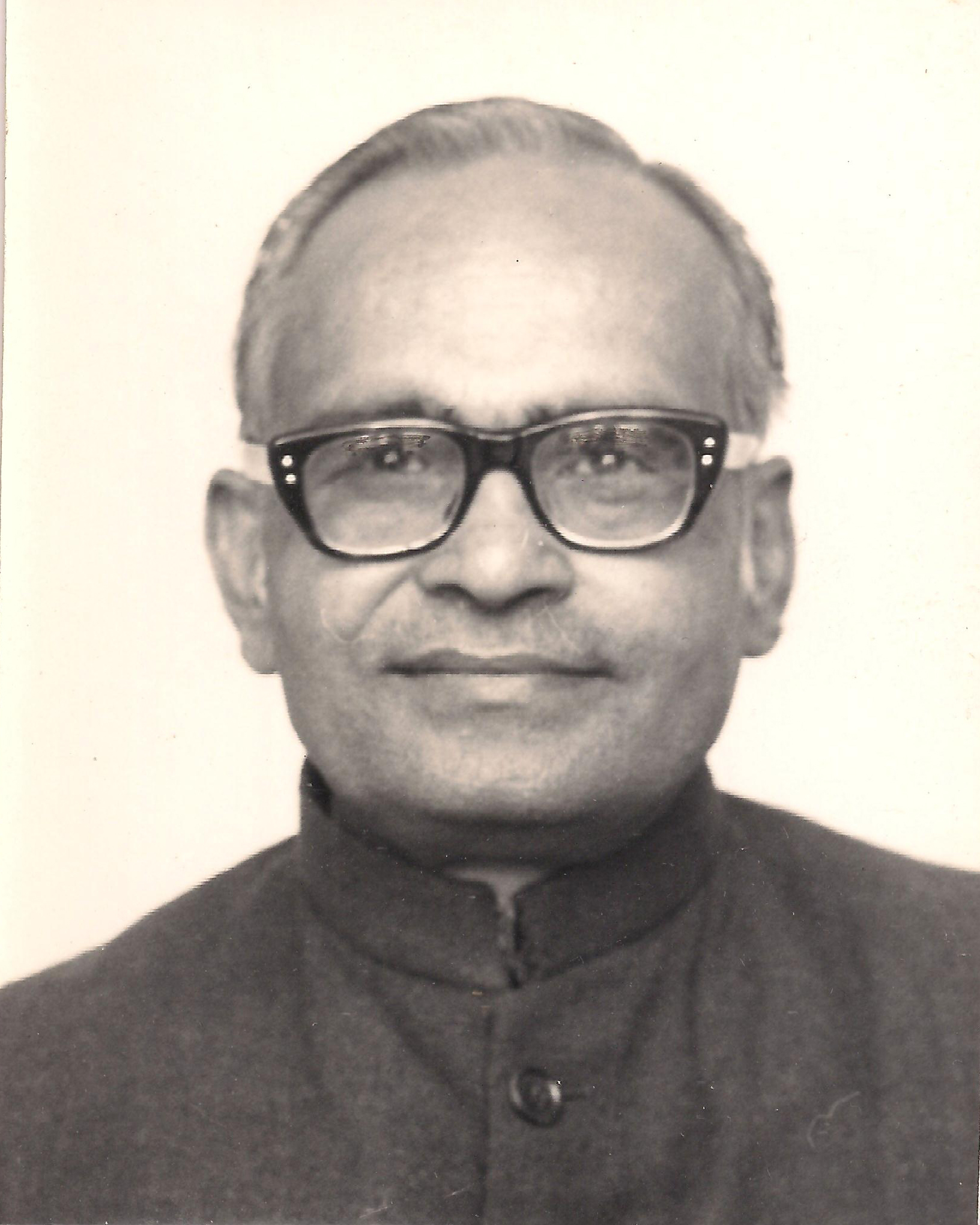
- Born: 17 March 1925; Sambhal, United Provinces, British India
- Died: 12 April 1985 (aged 60); New Delhi, India
- Education: postgraduate MA in Hindi
- Occupations: Writer, Poet, Journalist
- Children: 2

Ramavtar Tyagi, popularly known as "Tyagi" (17 March 1925 – 12 April 1985), was a Hindi poet.

== Biography ==
Ramavtar Tyagi, the first born child of a family of Smt. Bhagirathi and Shri.Tyagi Udal Singh in year 1925 in the village Kurkawali Sambhal district, Uttar Pradesh.

Tyagi's initial education began at the age of 10. He was married at the age of 16 in 1941. He completed high school in 1944.

Tyagi graduated from Chandausi Degree College in Moradabad and did his post-graduate work at Hindu College, Delhi University.

He has given personal Hindi speaking classes to Shri. Rajiv Gandhi (Former Prime Minister of India) and Shri. Sanjay Gandhi (son of Indira Gandhi).

He composed a song called Zindagi aur bata tera irada kya hai for the Hindi movie Zindagi Aur Toofan (1975).

He has worked with Times Group newspaper Navbharat Times. He wrote Political satire, the weekly article "Maluk Das ki Kalam Se".

Tyagi died on 12 April 1985.

== Writing ==
Tyagi has published more than 15 Hindi Poetry books, and a few novels are also in his credit.

He wrote a novel titled Samadhan, and an epistolary novel titled Charitraheen Ke Patra.

He edited Dilli Jo Ek Shahar Tha and Ram Jharokha.

His poetry collections include the following:

- Naya Khoon (1953)
- Main Dilli Hoon (1959)
- Dilli Jo Ek Shahar Tha
- Sapana Mahek Utahe (1965)
- Gulab Aur Babool Van (1973)
- Rashitriya Ektra Ki Kahaniyan
- Gata Hua Dard (1982)
- Mahakavi Kalida Rachit Meghdoot Ka Kayaanuvad
- Lahu Ke Chard Katare (1984)
- Geet Bolte Hain (1986, published posthumously)
- Hamare Lok Priya Geetksar Ramavtar Tyagi (Hindi) Hardcover Comic – 2006

by Sherjung Garg (Author)

His poems are taught in NCERT Hindi text books, of the ninth to twelfth standard of CBSE Syllabus in India. In the eighth standard, his poem "Samarpan" is part of a Hindi Text book in the UP Basic Education, Lucknow.

Shri Ramdhari Singh Dinkar commented on his poems, saying "Tyagi has written songs which certify that the songs in Hindi carry new language, new proverbs, new pose, new vision. I love the work of Tyagi. The way he cries, laughs, gets irritated, and even his pride carries a style, and wins your heart."
