= Margarete Hielscher =

Nazi doctor

Margarete Hielscher (September 12, 1899, in Arnsdorf – April 13, 1985, in Stadtroda) was a German doctor, who was involved in Nazi crimes in the context of "child euthanasia". Margarete Hielscher propagated in 1930 a segregation of mentally handicapped people whom she described as possessing "hereditary inferiority". During the Second World War, she led under the hospital clinic director Gerhard Kloos – euphemistically called – "Children's Department" at Thuringia State Hospitals Stadtroda, which was affiliated to the youth psychiatric department; the children admitted there, at least 72 died through food deprivation or lethal injection.
