= Thomas Dixon (Irish cricketer) =

Indian-born Irish cricketer (1906–1985)

Cricket information
- Batting: Right-handed
- Bowling: Right-arm fast-medium

International information
- National side: Ireland

Career statistics
Competition	First-class
Matches	14
Runs scored	312
Batting average	14.18
100s/50s	0/0
Top score	45*
Balls bowled	2,484
Wickets	50
Bowling average	20.86
5 wickets in innings	3
10 wickets in match	1
Best bowling	7/51
Catches/stumpings	4/–
- Source: CricketArchive, 6 December 2022

Thomas Hartigan Dixon (22 January 1906 – 12 April 1985) was an Irish cricketer. A right-handed batsman and right-arm fast-medium bowler, he made his debut for the Ireland cricket team against Scotland in July 1927 in a first-class match. He went on to play for Ireland on 17 occasions, his last match coming in July 1932 against the MCC.

Of his matches for Ireland, eight had first-class status. In all matches for Ireland, he scored 372 runs at an average of 15.50, with a top score of 52 not out against the MCC at Lord's in July 1931. He took 79 wickets at an average of 16.95, with his best bowling figures being 7/51 on his debut against Scotland.

Prior to playing for Ireland, he played two first-class matches for Dublin University against Northamptonshire in 1926. After playing for Ireland, he moved back to India, the country of his birth, and played four first-class matches there, one for a Viceroy's XI (the Viceroy of India at the time was George Freeman-Thomas) and three for Delhi. His brother Patrick also represented Ireland at cricket.
