= Sándor Török (writer) =

Hungarian writer (1904–1985)

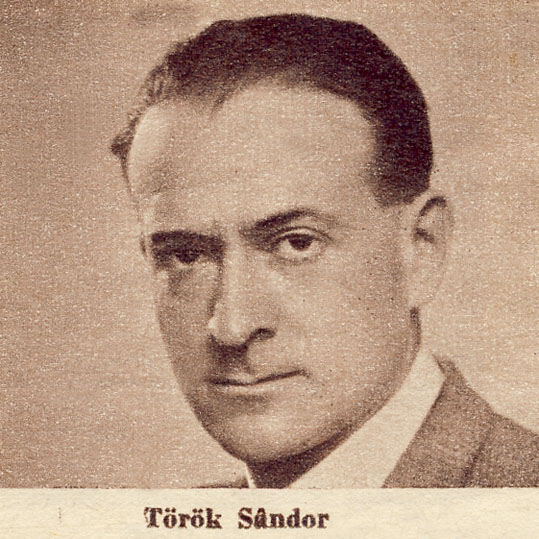
- Sándor Török in 1937
- Born: 25 February 1904; Homoróddaróc, Austria-Hungary (today Drăușeni, Romania)
- Died: 30 April 1985 (aged 81); Budapest, Hungary
- Occupations: Writer, journalist

Sándor Török (25 February 1904 – 30 April 1985) was a Hungarian journalist, writer and anthroposophist. He became known primarily for his children's books and youth novels.

== Early life ==
Török was born into an ethnic Hungarian family of Jewish descent in Transylvania, Austria-Hungary. His family were Reformed Christians who were converted from Judaism prior to Török's birth. His father was Lajos Török, a notary. Homoróddaróc (present-day Drăușeni, Romania) laid in the region Royal Lands (or Saxon lands), the southeast part of the Kingdom of Hungary. Török spent his childhood in Szerdahely (Miercurea Sibiului) and attended primary school in Brassó and Fogaras (Brașov and Făgăraș, respectively).

At the age of fourteen, he interrupted his secondary school studies and worked as a manual laborer. According to his autobiography, in the Kingdom of Romania, he worked as a boiler heater and coachman at the Czell brewery, as a field worker, and as a woodcutter. He was an industrial apprentice in Brașov, then he became a day laborer in the glass factory in Avrig. He was a track maintainer and blacksmith in Turnu Roșu, a postal employee in Tălmaciu. In Cluj, he passed the machine belt manufacturer exam at the Renner tannery, and was a chorister and actor at the Hungarian Theater for a short time.

== Journalist and writing career ==
Török began his career as a journalist in Hungarian-language newspapers in Cluj, Romania. From 1923, he worked for the Ellenzék, and from 1924, he was a police and forensic reporter for the Újság. He was drafted into the Romanian army and transferred to Moldavia in 1925. After his demobilization, he became a staff member of the Temesvári Hírlap in Timișoara. He emigrated to Hungary in the second half of the 1920s. From 1929, he was employed by Szegedi Napló, a daily newspaper in Szeged. He was a staff member of Magyarság in Budapest from 1931 to 1944. Simultaneously, he was also employed by the National Széchényi Library (OSZK). His first short stories and novels were inspired by court cases. His first novel was Az idegen város ("The Strange City"), from which he later wrote a play. He was awarded Baumgarten Prize in 1933. His play A komédiás ("The Comedian") was presented by the National Theatre in 1936, but his first success was his novel Valaki kopog ("Someone Knocks") in 1937. He became a member of the Petőfi Society in 1938. He wrote his most famous children's storybook Kököjszi és Bobojsza in 1939, which was followed by its second volume (Gilikoti) in 1945.

After the Second World War, he edited the series Ünnepi levelek of Magyar Rádió from 1945 to 1948, where he interviewed world-renowned scientists and artists. He was an editor at state company National Textbook Publisher from 1951 to 1959. He was a creator of the radio play Csilicsala csodái in 1953. He functioned as editor-in-chief of journal Család és Iskola from 1959 to 1966. During that time, anthroposophical meetings were held in his apartment. Török was a long-time promoter of the Waldorf education in Hungary. He was awarded Attila József Prize in 1974 and Aranytoll Prize in 1981.

== Role in the Jewish councils ==
Under the Second (1939) and Third Jewish Laws (1941), approximately 100,000 Christians were considered Jews. Török was among others. Following the German invasion of Hungary in March 1944, the representation of these people (called Converts) was placed under the jurisdiction of the newly established Jewish councils throughout Hungary. At the end of April 1944, Török was delegated to the Jewish Council of Budapest, representing the Converts, upon the intercession of his former colleague at Magyarság, far-right journalist and later government minister Ferenc Rajniss. Several Catholic organizations opposed the appointment of Török because he was a Reformed and had not been an active member of his church before that. In his report at the end of May, Török spoke out against the passivity of Christian churches in the case of converted forced laborers, those who receive food only from Jews, the rabbis also deal with them, while the Christian priests and pastors avoid the labor camps.

In early July 1944, the Ministry of the Interior drafted a plan to set up a separate council of Converts. Sándor Török, among others, participated in the drafting of the statute (which then never entered into force). The decree of 2540/1944 M. E. prescribed the organization of the representation of Converts in a separate administrative body, establishing the Association of Christian Jews of Hungary (Hungarian: Magyarországi Keresztény Zsidók Szövetsége), informally better known as "Christian Jewish Council" on 22 July 1944. With this step, the Döme Sztójay government was able to demonstrate in front of foreign missions that the Converts were treated positively. Török wrote in his memoir that "if the yellow badge remains, then this new Association is really an eye-wash, nothing more than a decorative cover [for the government]". Nevertheless, Török became vice-president of the newly erected council, which was officially presided by attorney György Auer, but Török remained the de facto leader and most active member of the council, whose headquarters was the Scottish Mission (St. Columba's Church of Scotland) building at Vörösmarty utca 49–51. Török constantly tried to get money for their operation from the Christian churches, but he also demanded rights similar to those of the capital's Jewish council (for instance, police protection). However, the council was mostly inaccessible to the Converts, who still preferred to write their letters to the church leaders. Török was among those persons, who delivered a copy of Auschwitz Protocols to Regent Miklós Horthy. Under Török, the Christian Jewish Council constantly appealed for the Converts to be able to move out of the yellow-star houses and to designate their own houses for them in Budapest. Tibor Keledy, the Lord Mayor of Budapest ordered a census of the converted Jews to move them separately from the Jewish yellow-star houses on 11 July 1944, but because of the objections of the Jewish council this plan failed. On 31 July–1 August, György Auer and Sándor Török negotiated with members of the Central Jewish Council in the Ministry of the Interior on the subject, but without result. Török sought closer cooperation between the two organizations (joint visits to the internment camps, joint presence in reconciliation bodies, etc.), but there was no openness to that from the part of Jewish leadership, who strongly discriminated against converts and they regarded them as "betrayers of the faith". In the allocation of aid, measures were taken against the Converts, frequently. Török was successful in that he sabotaged the release list of converted Jews to the Nazi authorities. The Christian Jewish Council was disestablished in the first days of the Arrow Cross Party coup, which took place on 15 October 1944. Sándor Török survived the siege of the capital at the mansion of former government minister Emil Nagy.

== List of works ==
- Az idegen város (novel, 1933)
- A felsült óriás és a 9 csoda (tales, 1934)
- Bankett a Kék Szarvasban (novel, 1935)
- Szegény embert még az ág is húzza (1935)
- És mégsem forog a Föld (1936)
- Valaki kopog (1937)
- Kököjszi és Bobojsza (children's book, 1939)
- Örök vasárnapok (novel, 1939)
- Különös éjszaka (novel, 1940)
- Gilikoti (children's book, 1945)
- Életed kész regény (novel, 1946)
- Titokzatos utazások (novel, 1947)
- Csilicsala csodái (youth novel, 1956)
- A hazug katona (1957)
- Tolvajok (novel, 1957)
- Csilicsala újabb csodái (youth novel, 1958)
- Vidéken volt primadonna (short stories, 1959)
- Csilicsala legújabb csodái (youth novel, 1961)
- Bilicse Péter szegényember (novel, Franklin Társulat, 1935; Magvető, 1962)
- A legkisebb isten (novel, 1966)
- A kisujjamból szoptam (novel, 1968)
- Test és lélek (essays, 1970)
- Hahó, Öcsi! (youth novel, 1973)
- Hahó, a tenger! (youth novel, 1974)
- Falatka királysága (youth novel, 1976)
- Egy kis kertet szerettem volna (autobiography, 1979)
- Az Isten mosolya. (essays, 1984)
- Szappanbuborék (novel, 1987)
- Vasárnapi beszélgetések; ed. Erki, Edit; Múzsák, Bp., 1990
- Mi az antropozófia. Bevezető előadások; ed. Szilágyi, Péter; Genius, Bp., 2000

== Sources ==
- Braham, Randolph L. (1981). The Politics of Genocide: The Holocaust in Hungary. Vol. 1–2. New York: Columbia University Press. ISBN 0-231-04496-8.
- Karsai, Elek (1967). Vádirat a nácizmus ellen. Dokumentumok a magyarországi zsidóüldözés történetéhez [An Indictment against Nazism. Documents for the History of the Persecution of Jews in Hungary] (in Hungarian). Vol. 3. Budapest: National Representation of Hungarian Israelites (MIOK).
- Veszprémy, László Bernát (2023). Tanácstalanság. A zsidó vezetés Magyarországon és a holokauszt, 1944–1945 [Bereft of Council. Jewish leadership in Hungary during the Holocaust in 1944–1945] (in Hungarian). Budapest: Jaffa Kiadó. ISBN 978-963-475-731-3.
