= Zoltán Horusitzky =

Hungarian composer

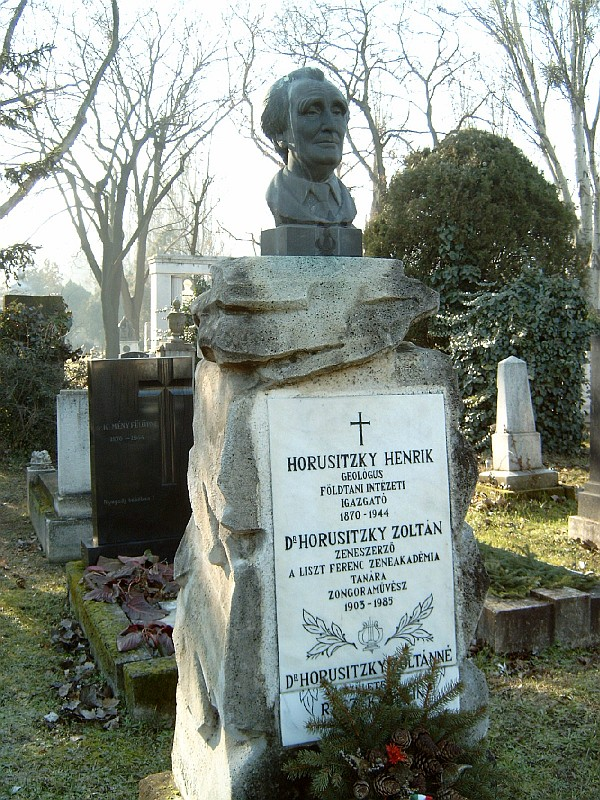
Horusitzky's grave in Budapest

Zoltán Horusitzky (18 July 1903 in Pápa – 25 April 1985 in Budapest) was a Hungarian composer. A pupil of Kodály, from 1938 Horusitzky was editor of A zene, a journal promoting the Magyar Korus movement.

== Recordings ==
- Zoltán Horusitzky: North - chamber cantata, Op. 70; Four Songs, Op. 8; New Songs, Op. 59; The Power of Music, Op. 73; Three Songs, Op. 7; Cello Sonata, Op. 71; Attila Fülöp (tenor), Jutta Bokor (mezzo-soprano), Kolos Kováts (bass), Tamás Salgó (piano), Zoltán Horusitzky (piano), Erika Lux (piano) Chorus of the Hungarian State Folk Ensemble, Chorus Vox Humana, Vác, Gergely Ménesi Hungaroton - HCD32263
- Horusitzky: Piano Sonata, Op. 45 'La Montagne', Chinese Songs, Op. 13; Three Sonnets by Shakespeare; French Songs Op. 58; Sonata for Two Pianos, Op. 51 1940, piano piece, Op. 12 No. 2; Margit László (soprano), Boldizsár Keönch (tenor), Zoltán Horusitzky, Imre Rohmann, Ferenc Rõczey Sr., Ferenc Rõczey Jr. (pianos) Hungaroton - HCD31670
