= List of VFL debuts in 1930 =

The 1930 Victorian Football League (VFL) season was the 34th season of the VFL. The season saw 135 Australian rules footballers make their senior VFL debut and a further 19 players transfer to new clubs having previously played in the VFL.

== Summary ==
Summary of debuts in 1930
Club	VFL debuts	Change of club
Carlton	6	0
Collingwood	5	2
Essendon	7	2
Fitzroy	13	1
Footscray	14	1
Geelong	9	0
Hawthorn	12	5
Melbourne	12	1
North Melbourne	21	5
Richmond	8	0
St Kilda	13	1
South Melbourne	15	1
Total	135	19

== Debuts ==
Name	Club	Age at debut	Round debuted	Games	Goals	Notes
Eric Huxtable	Carlton	21 years, 223 days	6	135	4	
Ted Pollock	Carlton	16 years, 200 days	9	43	20	Youngest Carlton debutant.
Les Allen	Carlton	19 years, 71 days	3	29	87	
Bruce Scharp	Carlton	25 years, 98 days	16	7	0	
Bill Flynn	Carlton	22 years, 261 days	7	1	3	
Henry Thomson	Carlton	23 years, 251 days	7	1	0	
Jack Regan	Collingwood	17 years, 247 days	3	196	3	
Fred Froude	Collingwood	19 years, 332 days	5	148	141	
Frank Kelly	Collingwood	19 years, 166 days	6	34	8	
Elvin Barr	Collingwood	21 years, 193 days	3	9	3	
Bill Aldag	Collingwood	24 years, 280 days	5	9	0	Previously played for Footscray.
Jack George	Collingwood	20 years, 55 days	7	7	0	
Bert Everett	Collingwood	25 years, 192 days	6	4	0	Previously played for Carlton.
Bill Lowenthal	Essendon	20 years, 355 days	18	73	14	
Mal MacRae	Essendon	20 years, 212 days	3	19	14	
Billy Lynch	Essendon	21 years, 33 days	5	18	1	Previously played for North Melbourne.
Tommy Gubbins	Essendon	22 years, 300 days	1	17	1	
Leo Glynn	Essendon	26 years, 200 days	10	9	0	
Charlie Sevior	Essendon	21 years, 357 days	1	5	2	
Gerry Donnelly	Essendon	26 years, 346 days	12	3	0	Youngest captain-coach in VFL history. Brother of Andy Donnelly. Previously played for North Melbourne and Melbourne.
Jock Turner	Essendon	21 years, 82 days	4	1	2	
Lindsay Smail	Essendon	19 years, 314 days	13	1	1	
Wilfred Smallhorn	Fitzroy	19 years, 88 days	4	150	31	1933 Brownlow medallist.
Colin Benham	Fitzroy	22 years, 161 days	1	81	70	
Fred Davies	Fitzroy	22 years, 54 days	1	63	11	
Con Hogan	Fitzroy	26 years, 211 days	1	30	0	
Gerald McKenzie	Fitzroy	26 years, 110 days	1	18	0	
Ken Veevers	Fitzroy	20 years, 327 days	8	18	2	Previously played for Collingwood.
Roy McDougall	Fitzroy	23 years, 17 days	12	8	0	
Ken Mackie	Fitzroy	19 years, 150 days	12	7	15	
Keith Fleming	Fitzroy	20 years, 238 days	11	6	4	Brother of Frank and Ian Fleming.
Frank Beggs	Fitzroy	25 years, 346 days	1	4	0	
Jack Williams	Fitzroy	22 years, 200 days	2	4	4	
Harry Challis	Fitzroy	24 years, 21 days	2	3	0	
Frank Raymond	Fitzroy	26 years, 297 days	7	1	0	
Lindsay Fricker	Fitzroy	24 years, 300 days	13	1	0	
Roy McKay	Footscray	21 years, 39 days	1	101	10	
Bill Sherman	Footscray	20 years, 315 days	6	21	4	Brother of Jack Sherman and Ted Sherman.
Horrie Stanway	Footscray	21 years, 208 days	6	20	4	
Leon Bazin	Footscray	23 years, 7 days	10	13	2	
Tom Sutherland	Footscray	20 years, 6 days	9	10	12	
Fred Coppock	Footscray	25 years, 105 days	1	9	1	
Roy Williams	Footscray	22 years, 211 days	4	9	10	
Stan Harris	Footscray	21 years, 63 days	1	8	3	Brother of John Harris. Previously played for Richmond.
Roy O'Donnell	Footscray	22 years, 200 days	5	7	10	
Arthur Smith	Footscray	21 years, 358 days	5	3	5	
Bertie Sharp	Footscray	19 years, 128 days	9	2	0	
Johnny Stanley	Footscray	24 years, 268 days	14	2	0	
Ron James	Footscray	23 years, 23 days	1	1	0	
Harry Bollman	Footscray	27 years, 286 days	9	1	0	
Cyril Harley	Footscray	19 years, 289 days	13	1	0	
Joe Sellwood	Geelong	19 years, 141 days	7	180	97	
Len Metherell	Geelong	21 years, 167 days	1	110	117	Brother of Jack Metherell.
Clive Coles	Geelong	19 years, 94 days	7	109	76	
Bob Troughton	Geelong	25 years, 320 days	1	92	100	
Bill Kuhlken	Geelong	20 years, 16 days	1	80	101	
Jack Carney	Geelong	21 years, 101 days	1	79	4	
Jack Walker	Geelong	20 years, 276 days	5	76	3	
Ted Riches	Geelong	23 years, 101 days	8	1	0	
Teddy Jones	Geelong	20 years, 114 days	9	1	0	
Bert Mills	Hawthorn	20 years, 76 days	1	196	60	Brother of Arthur Mills.
Leo Murphy	Hawthorn	20 years, 353 days	13	132	22	Father of John Murphy and grandfather of Marc Murphy.
George Bennett	Hawthorn	18 years, 223 days	1	92	9	
Wally Ware	Hawthorn	24 years, 101 days	9	63	27	Brother of Norman Ware.
Keith Sharpley	Hawthorn	21 years, 153 days	15	54	40	
Mark Daffey	Hawthorn	22 years, 59 days	6	37	26	
John Harris	Hawthorn	26 years, 180 days	1	34	10	Brother of Stan Harris. Previously played for Collingwood.
Reg Mulavin	Hawthorn	17 years, 279 days	7	11	0	
Bennie Lunn	Hawthorn	24 years, 326 days	1	10	0	Previously played for Richmond.
Arthur Mills	Hawthorn	24 years, 190 days	5	10	1	Brother of Bert Mills.
Len Mills	Hawthorn	32 years, 84 days	1	8	17	Previously played for St Kilda.
Ernie Sheil	Hawthorn	24 years, 22 days	4	5	0	Previously played for Carlton.
Jack Flanigan	Hawthorn	25 years, 74 days	11	5	1	Brother of Bob Flanigan.
Jim Veitch	Hawthorn	25 years, 143 days	5	4	0	
Reg Davies	Hawthorn	20 years, 237 days	12	3	0	
Fred Hansen	Hawthorn	27 years, 42 days	11	1	0	Previously played for Footscray.
Artie Frecker	Hawthorn	28 years, 302 days	12	1	0	
George Margitich	Melbourne	21 years, 166 days	1	75	267	
Bill Vanthoff	Melbourne	21 years, 122 days	1	60	42	
Reg Conole	Melbourne	28 years, 66 days	1	47	6	
Edwin Pemberton	Melbourne	21 years, 324 days	2	36	5	
Jack Power	Melbourne	20 years, 69 days	4	36	6	
Webber Jackson	Melbourne	20 years, 152 days	1	24	5	
Bill Cutler	Melbourne	29 years, 271 days	1	22	6	
Hec Davidson	Melbourne	22 years, 35 days	1	20	5	Brother of Arthur Davidson.
Harry Crapper	Melbourne	25 years, 136 days	5	12	7	Brother of Fred and Frank Crapper.
Howard Steel	Melbourne	19 years, 101 days	15	9	3	
Lew Gough	Melbourne	27 years, 12 days	18	5	0	Previously played for Hawthorn.
Colin Jackson	Melbourne	24 years, 65 days	1	2	0	
Geoff Frood	Melbourne	24 years, 114 days	10	1	2	
George Jerram	North Melbourne	25 years, 261 days	1	77	10	Previously played for Geelong.
Bob Mathews	North Melbourne	17 years, 250 days	1	58	32	
Syd Barker	North Melbourne	18 years, 277 days	12	41	4	Son of Syd Barker Sr.
Frank Wells	North Melbourne	20 years, 199 days	3	37	4	
Mowbray Weir	North Melbourne	21 years, 160 days	1	19	10	
Bert Peters	North Melbourne	21 years, 268 days	1	17	3	
Joe Knott	North Melbourne	23 years, 59 days	5	16	0	Previously played for North Melbourne.
Alex Clarke	North Melbourne	23 years, 41 days	10	15	0	
Roy Atkins	North Melbourne	21 years, 280 days	1	14	4	
Dick O'Shea	North Melbourne	21 years, 155 days	10	14	8	
Hector Moir	North Melbourne	20 years, 270 days	16	12	6	
Bill Spry	North Melbourne	23 years, 331 days	10	9	0	
Jim Heenan	North Melbourne	23 years, 319 days	1	8	1	Father of Jim P. Heenan.
Joe McElholum	North Melbourne	20 years, 104 days	12	8	2	
Jack Donovan	North Melbourne	20 years, 104 days	2	6	3	Previously played for Footscray.
Fred Dean	North Melbourne	21 years, 40 days	4	5	2	
Rupe Perrett	North Melbourne	20 years, 345 days	5	5	0	
Arthur Morley	North Melbourne	22 years, 239 days	18	5	0	
Clarrie Semmel	North Melbourne	20 years, 108 days	14	4	0	
Harold Davidson	North Melbourne	20 years, 4 days	15	4	0	
Frank Holmes	North Melbourne	30 years, 32 days	1	3	0	
Arthur Smith	North Melbourne	22 years, 28 days	1	2	0	Previously played for Footscray.
Wal McGrath	North Melbourne	20 years, 075 days	15	2	1	
Ray Clarke	North Melbourne	21 years, 288 days	1	1	0	
Leo Credlin	North Melbourne	26 years, 321 days	1	1	0	Previously played for Carlton.
Paul Clarke	North Melbourne	21 years, 233 days	18	1	0	
Kevin O'Neill	Richmond	22 years, 44 days	1	209	12	
Martin Bolger	Richmond	23 years, 271 days	3	185	2	
Ray Martin	Richmond	20 years, 173 days	2	159	135	
Eric Zschech	Richmond	20 years, 325 days	2	102	16	
Ted Cusack	Richmond	20 years, 3 days	3	2	0	
Hope Collins	Richmond	25 years, 256 days	1	1	1	
Bill Griffith	Richmond	24 years, 149 days	2	1	0	
Stan Ogden	Richmond	19 years, 197 days	3	1	0	
Jack Davis	St Kilda	21 years, 298 days	2	150	31	
Harry Comte	St Kilda	21 years, 54 days	1	104	55	
Clarrie Hindson	St Kilda	22 years, 208 days	1	90	0	
Pat Hartnett	St Kilda	20 years, 28 days	7	66	58	
Lloyd Jones	St Kilda	24 years, 119 days	1	54	7	
Doug Bourne	St Kilda	21 years, 251 days	16	48	2	
Arthur Roberts	St Kilda	19 years, 85 days	8	31	10	Brother of Billy Roberts.
Billy Stevens	St Kilda	24 years, 270 days	1	23	9	
Jim Forbes	St Kilda	21 years, 128 days	1	19	6	
Jack Smith	St Kilda	20 years, 268 days	4	9	8	
Clyde Beattie	St Kilda	24 years, 255 days	1	5	2	
Keith Storey	St Kilda	25 years, 51 days	10	5	0	
Hugh Dunbar	St Kilda	26 years, 310 days	01	3	1	Brother of Edgar and Harold Dunbar. Previously played for Melbourne.
Victor Lucas	St Kilda	23 years, 111 days	11	1	0	
Bob Pratt	South Melbourne	17 years, 245 days	1	158	681	Father of Bob Pratt Jr.
John Austin	South Melbourne	19 years, 166 days	4	140	19	
Reg Bennett	South Melbourne	23 years, 277 days	6	39	5	
Ron Shapter	South Melbourne	24 years, 306 days	1	26	14	
Rod Leffanue	South Melbourne	17 years, 120 days	1	12	14	
Martin Wheelahan	South Melbourne	22 years, 102 days	12	11	5	Brother of Danny Wheelahan.
Charlie Troughton	South Melbourne	23 years, 297 days	3	7	6	
Jack Shelton	South Melbourne	25 years, 141 days	7	7	2	Father of Bill Shelton, cousin of Bill Shelton and uncle of Ian Shelton. Previously played for St Kilda.
Dave Coutts	South Melbourne	25 years, 66 days	2	5	0	
Tasman Knight	South Melbourne	23 years, 164 days	1	4	0	
Ron Martin	South Melbourne	25 years, 287 days	9	4	3	
Bill Jordan	South Melbourne	23 years, 194 days	3	3	1	
Bill O'Brien	South Melbourne	25 years, 134 days	3	2	0	Grandfather of Gerard and Greg Healy.
Stan Lawler	South Melbourne	20 years, 291 days	17	2	6	
Alf Callick	South Melbourne	21 years, 354 days	18	1	2	
Roy Cassidy	South Melbourne	23 years, 86 days	18	1	0	
