= Deaths in November 1989 =

The following is a list of notable deaths in November 1989.

Entries for each day are listed alphabetically by surname. A typical entry lists information in the following sequence:

- Name, age, country of citizenship at birth, subsequent country of citizenship (if applicable), reason for notability, cause of death (if known), and reference.

== November 1989 ==
=== 1 ===
- Peter Childs, 50, English actor (Minder), leukemia.
- Haranath, 53, Indian actor, alcohol poisoning.
- Elise Harney, 65, American AAGPBL player.
- Robert James Moon, 78, American physicist, chemist and engineer (Manhattan Project).
- Mihaela Runceanu, 34, Romanian singer, murdered.
- Max Streib, 76, Swiss Olympic handball player (1936).
- Hoimar von Ditfurth, 68, German physician and scientific journalist, thyroid cancer.

=== 2 ===
- Inés Arredondo, 61, Mexican writer.
- Mildred Brown, 83, American journalist and newspaper publisher, co-founded the Omaha Star, severe cold.
- John Clymer, 82, American painter and illustrator.
- Morris H. DeGroot, 58, American statistician, editor of Statistical Science, lung cancer.
- Elizabeth Hawley Gasque, 103, American politician, member of the U.S. House of Representatives (1938-1939).
- Frederick Gordon-Lennox, 85, British hereditary peer, engineer and racing driver.
- Henry M. Margolis, 80, American industrialist, lawyer and theatrical producer, director of the International Center of Photography.
- Tom Mennard, 71, English comedian and actor, cancer.
- Steve Simpson, 41, American MLB player (San Diego Padres).
- Stefan Staszewski, 82, Polish communist politician.
- R. Sankara Narayanan Thampi, 78, Indian member of the Kerala Legislative Assembly.
- Shana Yardan, 46, Guyanese poet, cancer.

=== 3 ===
- Timoci Bavadra, 55, Fijian politician, Prime Minister of Fiji, cancer.
- Louis Craine, 32, American serial killer, AIDS.
- Dorothy Fuldheim, 96, American journalist and news anchor (Cleveland Press, WEWS-TV), stroke.
- Ed Kasid, 66, American basketball player.
- Leigh Leigh, 14, Australian murder victim.
- William Morris Jr., 90, American talent agent, president of William Morris Agency.
- Zelma O'Neal, 86, American actress (Paramount on Parade), singer and dancer.
- Edward J. Stack, 79, American politician, member of the U.S. House of Representatives.

=== 4 ===
- Pancho Coimbre, 80, Puerto Rican Negro League baseball player (New York Cubans), house fire.
- Neelkanth Ganjoo, 67, Indian high court judge, assassinated.
- Trevor Kent, 49, Australian theatre and television actor, AIDS.
- Erkki Kerttula, 79, Finnish fencer and dual Olympian (1948, 1952).
- Clare Leighton, 91, English-American artist, writer and illustrator.
- Vivian Mercier, 70, Irish literary critic.
- Edwin Pemberton, 81, Australian rules footballer.
- Howard A. Rusk, 88, American physician, founder of the Rusk Institute of Rehabilitation Medicine.
- Keiichirō Ryū, 65-66, Japanese editor, screenwriter and historical fiction writer.
- John Taylor, 81, Canadian cross-country skier and Olympian (1932).
- Bohumil Váňa, 69, Czech table tennis player and world champion.

=== 5 ===
- Vladimir Horowitz, 86, Russian-born American pianist and composer, heart attack.
- John O'Connell, 38, Australian rules footballer (Carlton).
- Barry Sadler, 49, American soldier, author and singer ("The Ballad of the Green Berets"), shot.
- Margot Seitelman, 61, German-born American businesswoman, executive director of American Mensa, cancer.
- Lu Watters, 77, American trumpeter and bandleader (Yerba Buena Jazz Band).
- Benigno Zaccagnini, 77, Italian politician, Minister of Labour and Social Security.
- Adem Čejvan, 62, Yugoslavian actor.

=== 6 ===
- Margarete Buber-Neumann, 88, German writer.
- Adrian Dullard, 71, Australian rules footballer.
- George Fett, 69, American cartoonist.
- Dickie Goodman, 55, American record producer, suicide.
- Alex Jordan Jr., 75, American creator of House on the Rock, heart attack.
- Little Sister Magdeleine of Jesus, 91, French founder of Little Sisters of Jesus.
- Yūsaku Matsuda, 40, Japanese actor, bladder cancer.
- William Murphy, 67, American film actor.
- Bjarne Rosén, 80, Norwegian footballer.

=== 7 ===
- Paula Acker, 76, German correspondent, journalist and newspaper editor.
- Dai Astley, 80, Welsh international footballer (Aston Villa, Wales).
- Andrey Borovykh, 68, Soviet World War II flying ace, twice Hero of the Soviet Union, stroke.
- May Justus, 91, American children's author.
- Alec Mango, 78, English actor (Captain Horatio Hornblower).
- Milton K. Ozaki, 76, American writer.
- Brunello Rondi, 64, Italian screenwriter and film director (La dolce vita), heart attack.
- Jan Skácel, 67, Czech poet.
- Tommy Tatum, 70, American MLB player (Brooklyn Dodgers, Cincinnati Reds).

=== 8 ===
- Robert Gerringer, 63, American actor (Dark Shadows), stroke.
- Ray D. Hahn, 91, American football and basketball player and coach.
- Choi Ja-shil, 74, Korean pentecostal pastor, founded Yoido Full Gospel Church, heart attack.
- Johnny Lanning, 79, American Major League baseball player (Pittsburgh Pirates).
- Lee Yuk-wing, 85, Macau-born American professor of electrical engineering.
- Yitzhak Raveh, 82, German-born Israeli judge (trial of Adolf Eichmann), heart failure.
- Mattie Rotenberg, 92, Canadian physicist and journalist.
- Maud Russell, 96, American social worker and writer (Young Women's Christian Association), lung cancer.
- Gino Soldà, 82, Italian cross-country skier and Olympian (1932).
- Elmer Wynne, 88, American NFL footballer and coach (Chicago Bears).
- Mary Agnes Yerkes, 103, American impressionist painter and photographer.

=== 9 ===
- Cliff Ashburn, 83, American NFL footballer (New York Giants).
- Kenny Hagood, 63, American jazz vocalist, cancer.
- Arthur John Holland, 71, American politician, mayor of Trenton, New Jersey, cancer.
- Enriqueta Mayora, 68, Mexican Olympic fencer (1948).
- Bill Neilson, 64, Australian politician, Premier of Tasmania, cancer.
- Roar Pedersen, 61, Norwegian ice hockey player and Olympian (1952).
- Nenad Petrović, 82, Yugoslavian chess player.
- Leen Vente, 78, Dutch international footballer (Feyenoord Rotterdam, Netherlands).
- Sarwo Edhie Wibowo, 64, Indonesian general, ambassador to South Korea, fever.

=== 10 ===
- Syd Dineen, 75, Australian rules footballer.
- Cookie Mueller, 40, American actress and author, AIDS.
- Niels Schibbye, 79, Danish Olympic sailor (1936).
- Craig J. Spence, 49, American journalist and lobbyist, suicide.

=== 11 ===
- Jay DeFeo, 60, American artist, lung cancer.
- Nicholas Freeman, 50, English politician, mayor of the Royal Borough of Kensington and Chelsea.
- Jean Holloway, 72, American film, radio and television writer.
- Natalio Pescia, 67, Argentinian international footballer (Boca Juniors, Argentina).

=== 12 ===
- Harry Bergström, 79, Finnish pianist, conductor and composer.
- Thomas Dam, 74, Danish woodworker and fisherman.
- Zoltán Dudás, 56, Hungarian international footballer and Olympic medalist (Budapest Honvéd, Hungary).
- Stan Galazin, 79, American NFL player (New York Giants).
- Iolas Huffman, 91, American football player (Ohio State Buckeyes).
- Dolores Ibárruri, 93, Spanish communist politician of the Spanish Civil War, pneumonia.
- Armour G. McDaniel, 73, American air force military officer.
- Victor Putmans, 75, Belgian footballer.
- Mao Yisheng, 93, Chinese structural engineer and politician.

=== 13 ===
- Eurico Caires, 37, Portuguese footballer.
- Victor Davis, 25, Canadian world champion swimmer and Olympic gold medalist (1984, 1988), pedestrian accident.
- Franz Joseph II, Prince of Liechtenstein, 83, Liechtenstein royal, reigning monarch.
- Upatissa Gamanayake, 41, Sri Lankan politician, deputy leader of Janatha Vimukthi Peramuna, shot by government forces.
- Roger Heman Jr, 57, American sound engineer (Jaws, Coal Miner's Daughter), lung cancer.
- H. B. Herath, 35, Sri Lankan politician, member of Janatha Vimukthi Peramuna, shot by government forces.
- Arthur Hutchings, 83, English musicologist, composer and professor of music.
- Dorothea Krook-Gilead, 69, Latvian-born literary scholar, translator and professor of English literature.
- Oliver F. Naquin, 85, American navy rear admiral, pancreatic cancer.
- Rohana Wijeweera, 46, Sri Lankan political activist, founder of Janatha Vimukthi Peramuna, shot by government forces.

=== 14 ===
- Wild Bill Davison, 83, American jazz cornetist.
- Choe Deok-sin, 75, South Korean Foreign Minister who defected to North Korea.
- Rémi Laurent, 32, French actor (La Cage aux Folles), AIDS.
- Jimmy Murphy, 79, Welsh international footballer (West Bromwich Albion, Wales), aortic dissection.
- Solomon Ngobeni, South African, last person executed by South African government.
- Samand Siabandov, 79, Soviet writer, soldier and politician, Hero of the Soviet Union.

=== 15 ===
- D. M. Ananda, 32, Sri Lankan member of the Janatha Vimukthi Peramuna, assassinated.
- Constance Binney, 93, American stage and silent-screen actress and dancer.
- Bartolomé Colombo, 73, Argentine footballer.
- William N. Deramus III, 73, American railroad executive.
- Alejo Durán, 70, Colombian traditional composer, singer and accordionist.
- Rocky Ellis, 78, American Negro Leagues baseball player.
- Jeremy Flint, 61, English contract bridge player and writer, cancer.
- Lipót Kállai, 76, Hungarian Olympic footballer (1936).
- George Manuel, 68, Canadian indigenous leader.
- Homer Marshman, 91, American owner of the Cleveland Rams.
- Andrzej Gąsienica Roj, 58, Polish Olympic alpine skier (1952, 1956).
- Norma Terris, 85, American musical theatre and vaudeville actress (Show Boat).
- Kamleshwari Prasad Yadav, 87, Indian politician, member of Constituent Assembly of India.

=== 16 ===
- Petar Argirov, 66, Bulgarian Olympic footballer (1952).
- Jean-Claude Malépart, 50, Canadian politician, member of the House of Commons of Canada (1973-1976, 1979-1989).
- Rose Murphy, 76, American jazz pianist and singer.
- Dorothy G. Page, 68, American "Mother of the Iditarod Trail Sled Dog Race".
- Oliver Smedley, 78, English businessman and political activist.
- Marie Uchytilová, 65, Czech sculptor and medalist.
- Victims of the 1989 murders of Jesuits in El Salvador:
  - Ignacio Ellacuría, 59, Spanish-Salvadoran Jesuit, philosopher and theologian, shot.
  - Ignacio Martín-Baró, 47, Spanish-Salvadoran Jesuit, philosopher and theologian, shot.
  - Segundo Montes, 56, Spanish-Salvadoran Jesuit, philosopher and theologian, shot.

=== 17 ===
- David Blundy, 44, British journalist and war correspondent, shot.
- Emerson Buckley, 73, American orchestra conductor, emphysema.
- Jack Cusick, 61, American MLB player (Chicago Cubs, Boston Braves).
- Costabile Farace, 29, American mobster (Bonanno crime family), shot.
- Benjamin Fisz, 66–67, Polish-born British film director and writer (A Town Called Bastard).
- Billy Lee, 60, American child actor (The Biscuit Eater), heart attack.
- Thiruchi Loganathan, 65, Indian singer.
- Uzair Gul Peshawari, 102–103, Pakistani Islamic scholar and activist.
- Charles Perry Stacey, 83, Canadian historian, official historian of the Canadian Army.
- Tom Starcevich, 71, Australian army soldier, Victoria Cross recipient.

=== 18 ===
- Les Deaton, 66, American basketball player and coach.
- Hendrik de Vries, 93, Dutch poet and painter.
- William Wister Haines, 81, American author, screenwriter and playwright, stroke.
- Johnny Haymer, 69, American actor (M*A*S*H), cancer.
- Edvin Laine, 84, Finnish film director and actor (The Unknown Soldier).
- Al Morgan, 74, American nightclub singer, pianist and composer ("Jealous Heart").
- Sherman Plunkett, 56, American NFL footballer (New York Jets), cancer.
- Freddie Waits, 46, American drummer, pneumonia and kidney failure.

=== 19 ===
- Grant Adcox, 39, American stockcar driver, racing crash.
- Clemente Carreras, 75, Cuban Negro Leagues baseball player.
- Nancy Drexel, 79, American actress.
- Sol Harrison, 71–72, American comic book colorist.
- William McNab, 73, Scottish cricketer.
- Shigeki Mori, 79, Japanese businessman and politician, mayor of Neagari, Ishikawa.
- Paul Shyre, 63, American director and playwright (Will Rogers' USA), septicaemia.

=== 20 ===
- Lynn Bari, 69, American movie actress (China Girl), heart attack.
- Hirabai Barodekar, 84, Indian Hindustani classical music singer.
- Arnold Bauman, 75, American district judge, cancer.
- Wade Ellis, 80, American mathematician, heart attack.
- Božidar Jakac, 90, Yugoslav painter, photographer and filmmaker.
- Flavien Zacharie Melki, 90, Syriac Catholic archbishop.
- Josu Muguruza, 30–31, Spanish journalist and politician, assassinated.
- Leonardo Sciascia, 68, Italian writer and politician, member of the European Parliament, heart attack.
- Abe Stuber, 86, American football player and coach.
- William J. Whaling ("Wild Bill"), 95, American general in the US Marine Corps, Olympic shooter (1924).
- Rachel Wischnitzer, 104, Russian-born German and American art historian.

=== 21 ===
- Helen Daniels Bader, 62, American social worker and philanthropist, ovarian cancer.
- Edward Bawden, 86, English painter, illustrator and graphic artist.
- Peter Burton, 68, English film and television actor (Dr. No), heart attack.
- Colin Cox, 67, Australian rules footballer.
- Heiko Fischer, 29, West German figure skater, national champion and Olympian (1984, 1988), chronic myocarditis.
- Will Glahé, 87, German accordionist, composer and bandleader ("Beer Barrel Polka").
- Arne Grahn, 87, Finnish Olympic tennis player (1924).
- Harvey Hart, 61, Canadian film and television director and television producer, heart attack.
- Clement Spiette, 73, Belgian Olympic canoeist (1936).
- Tibor Székelyhidy, 85, Hungarian Olympic fencer (1936).
- Yana, 58, British singer, esophageal cancer.

=== 22 ===
- Paul Alfonsi, 81, American politician, Speaker of the Wisconsin State Assembly.
- Roberto Arias, 71, Panamanian international politician and diplomat, husband of Margot Fonteyn, heart attack.
- C. C. Beck, 79, American comic book artist, co-creator of Captain Marvel, renal failure.
- Robert Berri, 76, French film actor.
- Gerry Chiniquy, 77, American animator (Warner Bros. Cartoons).
- José G. Cruz, 72, Mexican comics writer and screenwriter.
- H. O. Davies, 84, Nigerian lawyer, journalist and politician.
- Harvey Hart, 61, Canadian film and television director.
- Clement Haynsworth, 77, American judge, heart attack.
- Abdur Rashid Kardar, 85, Indian film actor and director.
- Billy Milton, 83, British stage, film and television actor.
- René Moawad, 64, Lebanese politician, President of Lebanon, assassinated.
- Vijay Rajindernath, 61, Indian test cricketer.
- Shamil Serikov, 33, Soviet wrestler and Olympic gold medalist (1980), suicide.

=== 23 ===
- Jiří Baumruk, 59, Czech international basketballer, coach and Olympian (Sparta Prague), traffic collision.
- Martin Glaessner, 82, Austrian-Australian geologist and palaeontologist.
- Sidney Janis, 93, American clothing manufacturer and art collector, pneumonia.
- Rita Lenihan, 75, American naval officer, cancer.
- Lefty Moses, 75, American Negro Leagues baseball player.
- Armand Salacrou, 90, French dramatist and member of French Resistance.
- Mariko Shiga, 19, Japanese singer, traffic accident.
- Alojzy Sitko, 78, Polish Olympic footballer (1936) and manager (Zagłębie Lubin).

=== 24 ===
- E. Ruth Anderson, 82, American musicologist and editor.
- Gordon Bess, 60, American cartoonist (Redeye).
- Leonard Boudin, 77, American civil liberties attorney and activist, heart attack.
- Michael Harwood, 54–55, American environmentalist and author, embolism.
- Lawrence A. Hyland, 92, American electrical engineer, heart attack.
- Richard Korherr, 86, Nazi German statistician and Sturmbannführer.
- Ralph Norwood, 23, American NFL footballer (Atlanta Falcons), traffic collision.

=== 25 ===
- Salo Wittmayer Baron, 94, Austro-Hungarian–born American historian.
- Sir George Cakobau, 77, Fijian politician, Governor-General of Fiji.
- Harry Challis, 83, Australian rules footballer.
- Claus Clausen, 90, German film actor.
- Birago Diop, 82, Senegalese poet and storyteller.
- Alva R. Fitch, 82, American general in the U.S. Army, deputy director of the Defense Intelligence Agency.
- John Kaplan, 60, American lawyer and author, brain tumour.
- Frank A. Southard Jr., 82, American deputy managing director of the International Monetary Fund, cancer.
- William Stratton, 86, British army officer, Commander British Forces in Hong Kong.
- María Colón Sánchez, 62–63, Puerto Rico–American politician (Connecticut General Assembly), heart attack.
- Frank M. Thomas, 100, American stage, screen and television actor (A Man to Remember).
- Clifford Thornton, 53, American jazz trumpeter and trombonist.

=== 26 ===
- Ahmed Abdallah, 70, Comoros politician, president of the Comoros, assassinated.
- William Barber, 70, English first class cricketer.
- Morrice James, 73, British diplomat, High Commissioner to Australia, Pakistan and India.
- Lew Fonseca, 90, American Major League baseball player and manager (Cleveland Indians, Cincinnati Reds).
- Gunnar Hedlund, 89, Swedish politician, Minister of the Interior.
- Maurice Kelly, 65, Bahamian Olympic sailor (1960).
- Priscilla Robertson, 79, American historian and college professor, stroke.
- Chand Usmani, 56, Indian actress (Pehchan).

=== 27 ===
- Ray Boggs 84, American MLB player (Boston Braves).
- Frank Fools Crow, 99, Native American civic and religious leader.
- Zuko Džumhur, 68, Yugoslavian writer, painter and caricaturist.
- Walter Hoving, 91, Swedish-born American businessman and writer, chairman of Tiffany & Co.
- Carlos Arias Navarro, 80, Spanish politician, Prime Minister of Spain, heart attack.
- Øystein Mellerud, 51, Norwegian Olympic ice hockey player (1964).
- Norma Nichols, 95, American silent-screen actress (The Ne'er-Do-Well).
- Claudio O. Teehankee, Sr., 71, Filipino judge and diplomat, Chief Justice of the Philippines, cancer.
- Trude von Molo, 82, Austrian film actress (The Theft of the Mona Lisa).

=== 28 ===
- Arsenie Boca, 79, Romanian priest and artist.
- Ernesto Civardi, 83, Italian cardinal and secretary of the Sacred Congregation for Bishops.
- Georgy Ilivitsky, 68, Soviet chess master, suicide.
- Dolan Nichols, 59, American MLB player (Chicago Cubs).
- Bill Posedel, 83, American Major League baseball player (Boston Bees/Braves).
- Jo Vincent, 91, Dutch soprano.

=== 29 ===
- Sir Gubby Allen, 87, Australian-born English cricketer, captain of England, national selector, complications from surgery.
- Giuseppe Antonini, 75, Italian professional footballer (AC Milan).
- Nancy Bell, 65, Canadian politician, member of the Senate of Canada (1970-).
- Ann Burton (born Johanna Rafalowicz, aka Johanna de Paauw), 56, Dutch jazz singer, throat cancer.
- Mario Colli, 74, Italian film and voice actor.
- Natan Eidelman, 59, Soviet author and historian.
- Sisto Gillarduzzi, 81, Italian bobsledder and alpine ski racer.
- Jim Jepson, 47, Canadian politician, member of the House of Commons of Canada (1984-1988).
- Yam Kim-fai, 76, Chinese and Hong Kong opera actress, pneumonia.
- A. Maruthakasi, 69, Indian film lyricist and poet.
- Ion Popescu-Gopo, 66, Romanian graphic artist and animator, heart attack.
- Frank Scannell, 86, American film and television actor (The Life and Legend of Wyatt Earp).
- Mabel Keaton Staupers, 99, American nurse and civil rights activist.
- Rolf Turkka, 74, Finnish sailor and dual Olympian (1948, 1952).
- Ödön Zombori, 83, Hungarian wrestler and Olympic gold medalist (1928, 1932, 1936).

=== 30 ===
- Ahmadou Ahidjo, 65, Cameroonian politician, President of Cameroon, heart attack.
- Stjepan Boltižar, 76, Yugoslavian gymnast and Olympian (1948).
- Hassan Fathi, 89, Egyptian architect.
- Alfred Herrhausen, 59, German banker, Chairman of Deutsche Bank, assassinated.
- Teddy Jones, 79, Australian rules footballer.
- Gabriel Manek, 76, Indonesian archbishop of the Roman Catholic Church.
- Pier Luigi Vestrini, 84, Italian rower, European champion and Olympian (1928).

=== Date unknown ===
- B. J. Arnau, 48, American-born singer and actress ("Live and Let Die"), brain tumour.
- Roy Brown, 65, English footballer (Stoke City, Watford).
- Édouard Candeveau, 91, Swiss Olympic rower (1920, 1924, 1928).
- Philip Core, 37–38, American-born English artist and writer, AIDS.
- Ione Robinson, 78–79, American artist and writer.
