= Gubbins =

Gubbins is a surname. Notable people with the surname include:

- Beatrice Gubbins (1878–1944), Irish artist in watercolour
- Colin Gubbins (1896–1976), prime mover of the Special Operations Executive (SOE) in the Second World War
- David Gubbins (born 1947), British geophysicist
- Doris Gubbins (died 1961), Welsh international table tennis player
- George Gubbins (born 1935), Canadian jockey
- James Gubbins Fitzgerald (1852–1926), medical practitioner, Irish nationalist politician and UK Member of Parliament (MP)
- Joe Gubbins (born 2001), English footballer
- John Gaspard Gubbins (1877–1935), Africana collector and writer
- John Gubbins (1838–1906), Irish thoroughbred horse breeder
- John Harington Gubbins (1852–1929), British linguist, consular official and diplomat
- Keith E. Gubbins (born 1937), British-born American chemical engineer
- Martin Gubbins (1812–1863), British official in India
- Mary Eyles Gubbins (1818–1887), British writer of novels and short stories
- Nathaniel Gubbins (1893–1976), British journalist and humorist
- Nick Gubbins (born 1993), English cricketer
- Ralph Gubbins (1932–2011), English footballer
- Tommy Gubbins (1907–1976), Australian rules footballer

== See also ==
- Gubbins band, group of footpads, sheep-stealers, beggars, cutpurses, cut-throats and highwaymen around Lydford in Devon during the English Civil War
- Gubbins, Hertfordshire; now Brookmans Park, a village in south-east England that is known for its BBC transmitter station
- John Gubbins Newton and His Sister, Mary Newton, a 1833 painting by Robert Burnard
- Gubin (disambiguation)
