= Gubin =

Gubin may refer to:

- Gubin (surname)
- Gubin, Poland, a town on the Polish-German border
- Polish and Sorbian name for Guben, a town in Brandenburg, Germany
- Gubin, Bosnia and Herzegovina, a village in Bosnia and Herzegovina
- Gmina Gubin, a rural administrative district in Lubusz Voivodeship, western Poland
- Gubin Coal Mine, a large mine in the west of Poland in Gubin, Lubusz Voivodeship
- Gubin Do, a village in the Užice municipality of Serbia

== See also ==
- Gubino, several rural localities in Russia
