= Clarrie Hindson =

Australian rules footballer

Personal information
- Full name: Clarence Melville Hindson
- Born: 6 October 1907; Wychitella, Victoria
- Died: 12 February 2002 (aged 94); Tewantin, Queensland
- Original team: Brighton Vale Amateurs
- Height: 173 cm (5 ft 8 in)
- Weight: 73 kg (161 lb)

Playing career^{1}
Years	Club	Games (Goals)
1930–1936	St Kilda	90 (0)
- ^{1} Playing statistics correct to the end of 1936.

Clarence Melville Hindson (6 October 1907 – 12 February 2002) was an Australian rules footballer who played with St Kilda in the Victorian Football League (VFL).

== Family ==
The son of Charles Melville Hindson (1882–1947), and Mary Winifred Hindson (1887–1974), née McMahon, Clarence Melville Hindson was born at Wychitella, Victoria on 6 October 1907. His brother, Cyril James Hindson (1912-), played in 106 games for the Brighton Football Club in the VFA from 1935 to 1940.

He married Dulcie May Barker (1914–1982) in 1936.

== Cricket ==
He played Sub-District cricket with the Brighton Cricket Club in the 1930–31 season.

== Football ==
He was recruited from the Brighton Vale Football Club in the C-Section of the Metropolitan Amateur Football Association (MAFA). Identified as "unallotted", Hindson was granted a permit to play with St Kilda on 23 April 1930.

=== St Kilda (VFL) ===
Hindson was captain of St Kilda for part of the 1933 VFL season, after the playing coach broke his shoulder. He didn't captain the club the following year but was in charge for the entire 1935 season.

=== 27 May 1933 ===
In his last senior match of St Kilda, Hindson was one of those injured in the infamous and brutal match against North Melbourne, at the Junction Oval, on 27 May 1933 — which was stopped at one stage because a wild brawl instigated by the North Melbourne players had erupted in the centre — in which (at that time winless in 1933) St Kilda, with only 15 men still on the field, defeated North Melbourne 13.19 (97) to 11.17 (83).

Of the nineteen St Kilda men that participated (i.e, including the 19th man Tom Fogarty), eleven were injured: Jack Anderson (leg), Stewart Anderson (knocked out), Roy Bence (concussion; twice), Doug Bourne (calf), Matt Cave (eye gash), Bill Downie (broken thumb), Jack George (ankle), Clarrie Hindson (broken ankle), Jack Holden (ankle), Bill Mohr (broken ribs), and Billy Roberts (concussion). Despite their injuries, seven remained on the field: Jack Anderson, Stewart Anderson, Bourne, Bill Downie, George, Holden, and Roberts. The St Kilda President, Gallipoli veteran and naval war hero Commander Fred Arlington-Burke, who described St Kilda's 15-man victory as the greatest moral victory in the club's history, commissioned a silver "Badge of Courage" — bearing the inscription "St KILDA DEFEATED Nth MELBOURNE WITH 15 MEN MAY 27th 1933" — which was awarded to each of the players that took part in the match.

=== South Bendigo (BFL) ===
After retiring from the VFL, Hindson was captain-coach of the South Bendigo in the Bendigo Football League for three seasons: 1937 to 1939.

== Military service ==
He would later serve with the Australian Army in World War II.

== Death ==
He died at Tewantin, Queensland on 12 February 2002.
