= Jim Heenan =

Jim Heenan may refer to:

- Jim Heenan (footballer, born 1906) (1906–1981), Australian rules footballer for North Melbourne
- Jim Heenan (footballer, born 1930) (1930–1999), Australian rules footballer for Essendon, son of the above
