= Mayora =

Mayora is a surname. Notable people with the surname include:

- Diego Mayora (born 1992), Peruvian footballer
- Enriqueta Mayora (1921–1989), Mexican fencer
- Julio Mayora (born 1996), Venezuelan weightlifter
- Matthew Mayora (born 1986), Australian footballer
