= Alfred Callick =

Alfred Callick may refer to:

- Alf Callick (footballer, born 1908), Australian rules footballer for South Melbourne and Fitzroy
- Alf Callick (footballer, born 1925), Australian rules footballer for South Melbourne
