= Bill Cutler =

Bill Cutler may refer to:

- Bill Cutler (baseball executive) (1920–2012), American baseball executive
- Bill Cutler (footballer) (1900–1969), Australian footballer
