= General Wali Kothi =

- तारा वाली कोठी
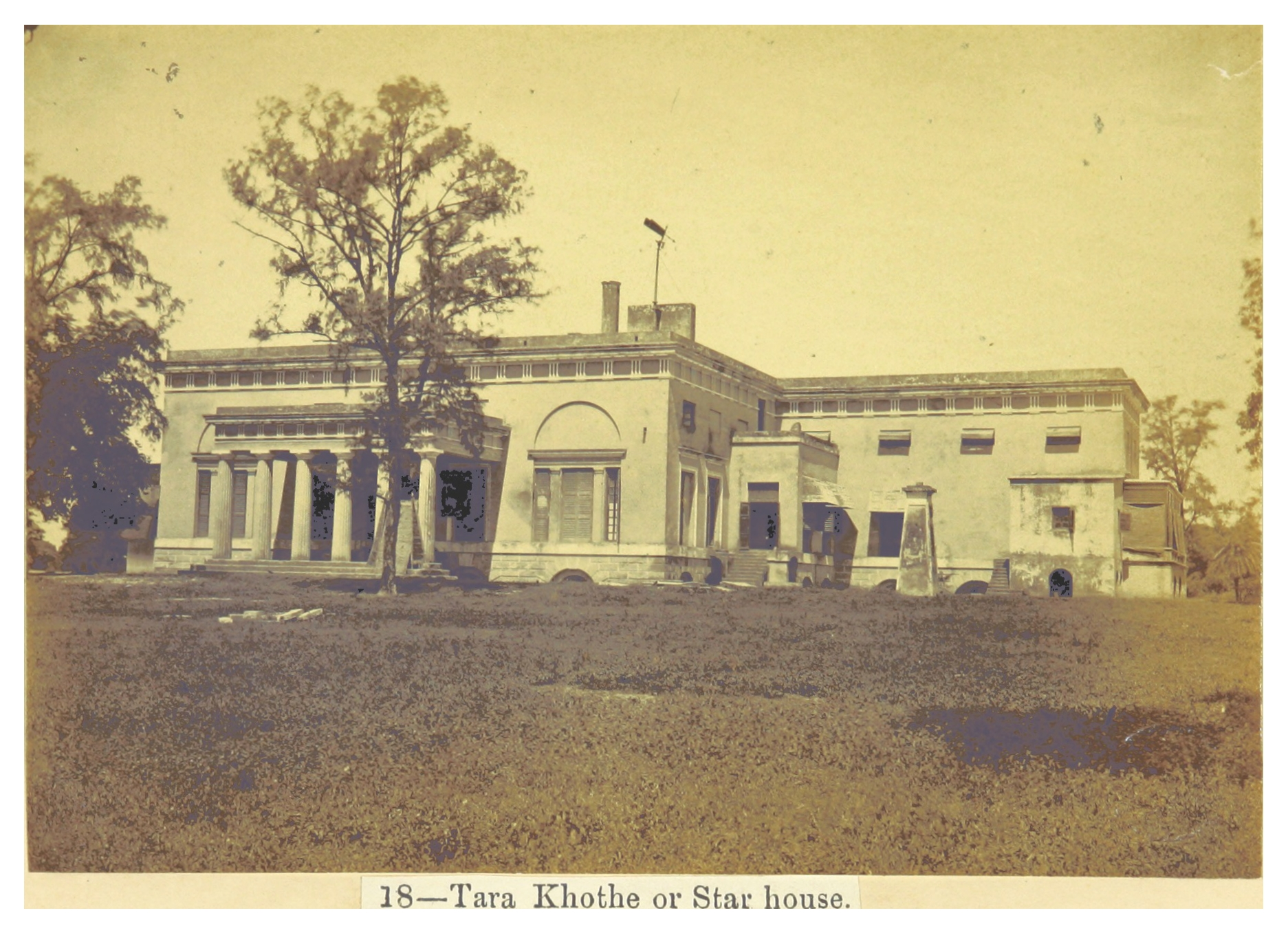
- Tara Khothe or Star house in 1874 by Darogha Ubbas Alli
- Alternative names: Star House

General information
- Location: Lucknow, India
- Coordinates: 26°51′13.4″N 80°56′23.3″E
- Current tenants: State Bank of India
- Construction started: 1832
- Opened: 1841

General Wali Kothi was an observatory commissioned in 1832 by King of Oudh Nasir-ud-Din Haidar Shah. It was not functional until 1841 when Colonel Richard Wilcox, a Royal Astronomer, was appointed.

It contained several excellent instruments. On the death of Wilcox in 1847, the establishment was dismissed, and the instruments disappeared during the Mutiny. It was said that once a brass pillar stood in central chamber through the roof.

== History ==
The building was the headquarters of the Maulvi Ahmadullah Shah of Faizabad during the Indian Rebellion of 1857, and the insurgent council frequently held its meetings there. Later it was occupied by the Imperial Bank of India, being restored for use as a bank but, in October 1923, it was flooded for 15 days. Mr. Davis then the occupant bank manager, his staff and clients used boats to ferry them back and forth. Some years later, it was used for as a local court of civil justice. later it was occupied by the Imperial Bank of India (now, State Bank of India), and became the bank's headquarters in 1923. Now it is a SBI branch head office.

Martin Gubbins described it as a handsome classical design building, protected by a regular guard of native infantry.

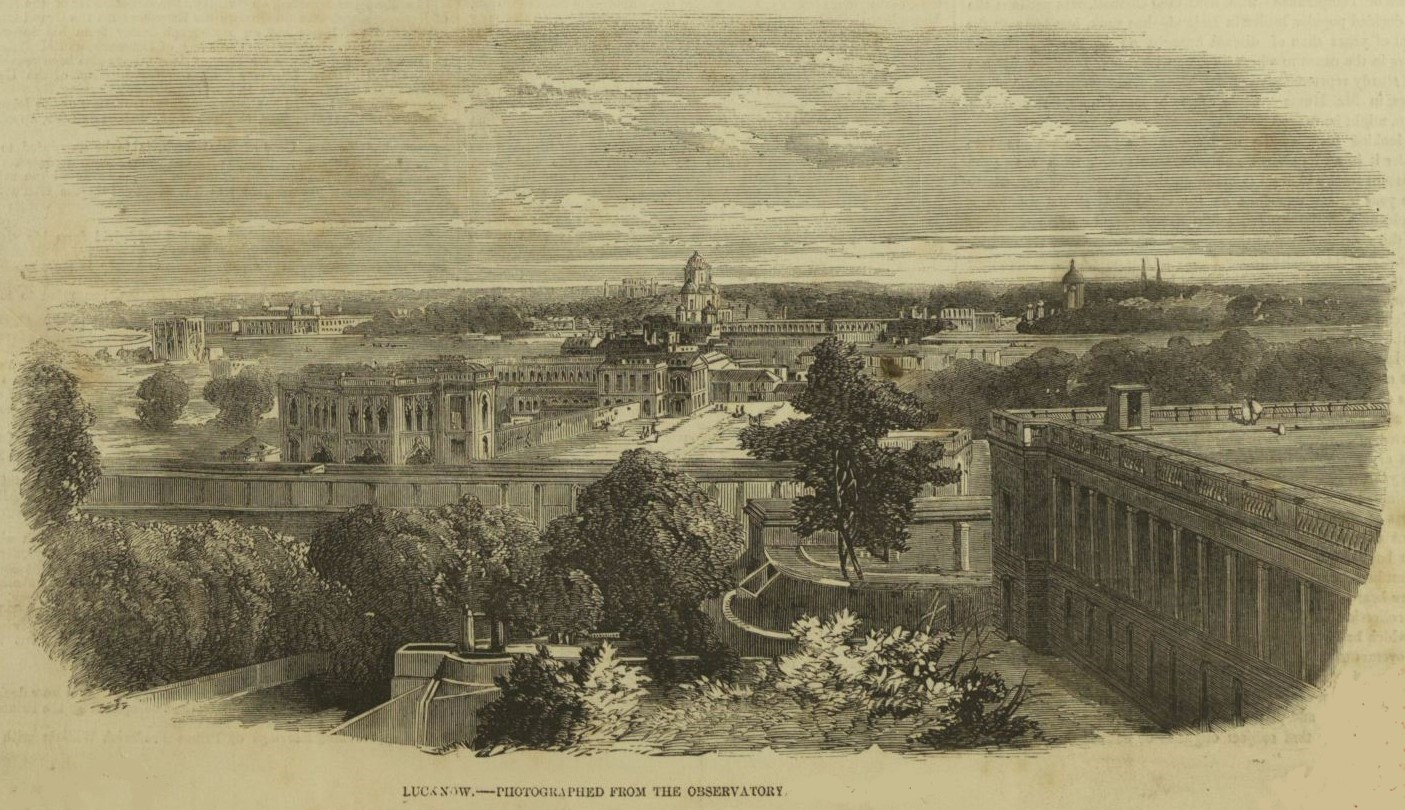
Lucknow, viewed from the Observatory, Illustrated London News

== See also ==
- List of astronomical observatories
