= Gubin (surname) =

Gubin (Russian: Губин), feminine: Gubina is a Russian masculine surname originating from the noun guba, which literally means a lip and in a Russian slang refers to a stubborn person. The surname may refer to the following notable people:

- Andrey Gubin (born 1974), Russian former pop-singer, poet, composer, and record producer
- Aleksandr Gubin (born 1935), Russian cross-country skier
- Éliane Gubin (born 1942), Belgian historian, researcher and professor
- Oleg Gubin (born April 1981), Russian professional ice hockey forward
- Selma Gubin (1903–1974), Russian-born American artist
- Tatyana Gubina (born 1977), Kazakhstani water polo player
