= Coulter Law =

In Australian rules football, The Coulter Law was a ruling instituted by the Victorian Football League (VFL) in 1930 that capped payments and outlawed signing-on bonuses and other inducements for VFL players.

== Background ==
Named after former Melbourne Football Club VFL player Gordon Coulter, who was the Melbourne delegate to the VFL and chaired the VFL Player Payments Committee which drafted the rule, the Coulter Law was intended to stop the practice of wealthy clubs offering large inducements to the best players, thus leading to an uneven competition. Wages were initially capped at £3 (roughly equivalent to A$279 in 2022) per minor round game and £12 (equivalent to A$1,117 in 2022) for a finals match, although players could be paid less. There were also a range of penalties for breaches, including fines, suspension of players and deduction of premiership points.

While the VFL was officially amateur until 1911, in practice, the league's star players had been covertly paid for years, with the earliest reports of this dating back to 1886 in the VFA. The Collingwood-supporting businessman and benefactor John Wren was particularly well known to covertly pay bonuses to Collingwood players.

While each Melbourne-based VFL club was allocated its own recruiting zone in Melbourne, players from country areas, interstate and the rival Victorian Football Association (VFA) were not covered by zoning, meaning clubs could (and did) offer inducements to leading players to sign with them.

== The Coulter Law in place ==
The first test of the Coulter Law came in 1930, when superstar Haydn Bunton Sr. from Ovens and Murray Football League club West Albury was barred from VFL football until December 31, 1930, for breaches of the Coulter Law over allegations Bunton signed a contract with Fitzroy for £200 per year (equivalent to A$18,613 in 2022), well in excess of the possible maximum of £90 per year (equivalent to A$8,376 in 2022). The salary cap was based on 18 home-and-away matches and three finals.

Bunton finally made his debut for Fitzroy in Round 1 of the 1931 VFL season.

== Reactions ==
From the time the Coulter Law was put in place, there were criticisms of it. A 1933 newspaper article complained that the good name of Gordon Coulter was "associated with such a travesty of the law."

In 1944, several clubs were urging a rise in the maximum payments, arguing that New South Wales Rugby League players were paid up to £10 per game (equivalent to A$810 in 2022). While maximum player payments were raised throughout the time the law was in place, by 1961 the maximum match payment was still a paltry £6 per game (equivalent to A$195 in 2022). As a result, many leading players left the VFL to play in other competitions that had no rules equivalent to the Coulter Law, including South Melbourne superstar Laurie Nash, who transferred to Victorian Football Association (VFA) club Camberwell, and Melbourne full-forward Fred Fanning, whose wage increased from £3 (equivalent to A$208 in 2022) to £20 (equivalent to A$1,384 in 2022) per game when he was appointed captain-coach of Western District Football League club Hamilton in 1948.

As time went by, the Coulter Law became increasingly difficult to enforce; and, by the late 1960s, journalists were openly deriding the law as antiquated and demanding that the VFL scrap it. In 1967, commentator Harry Beitzel claimed "it was common knowledge that most of the star players were under contracts that paid them many times more than the Coulter Law limit."

The Coulter Law was scrapped at the completion of the 1970 VFL season, with clubs allowed to pay larger fees to players, two interstate recruits allowed for each club, and the introduction of transfer and signing-on fees.

With the introduction of salary cap and floor rules in 1987, following the admission of Brisbane and West Coast to the competition, limits have been set on total player payments (as opposed to individual players), while interstate recruiting has become widespread in the national competition. Transfer and signing-on fees were prohibited (along with playing coaches) to prevent wealthier clubs from evading the restrictions of the salary cap and floor.

== Sources ==
- Andreff, W. & Szymanski, S. (ed.) (2006) Handbook on the Economics of Sport, Edward Elgar Publishing: Cheltenham. ISBN 1847204074.
- Collins, B. (2008). The red fox: The biography of Norm Smith: Legendary Melbourne coach, Melbourne: Slattery Media Group. ISBN 9781921778742
- Frost, L., Schuwalow, P. & Borrowman, L. (2012) "Labour market regulation and team performance: The Victorian Football League’s Coulter Law, 1930–1970", Sport Management Review, 15.
- Hess, R., Nicholson, M., Stewart, B., & De Moore, G. (2008). A national game: The history of Australian Rules football, Penguin: Melbourne. ISBN 0670070890.
- Piesse, K. (2011) Football Legends of the Bush, Penguin: Sydney. ISBN 1742533736.
- Slattery, G. (2010) The Brownlow: A Tribute to the Greats of Australian Football, Slattery Media Group: Melbourne. ISBN 0980744741.
