= Keith Fleming =

Australian rules footballer, born 1909

Personal information
- Full name: Keith George Fleming
- Born: 16 November 1909; Kyogle, New South Wales
- Died: 10 July 1985 (aged 75); Nambour, Queensland
- Original team: Heidelberg All Blacks
- Height: 180 cm (5 ft 11 in)
- Weight: 82 kg (181 lb)

Playing career^{1}
| Years | Club | Games (Goals) |
| 1930, 1934 | Fitzroy | 6 (4) |
| 1932 | Hawthorn | 1 (0) |
| Total | | 7 (4) |
- ^{1} Playing statistics correct to the end of 1932.

Keith George Fleming (16 November 1909 – 10 July 1985) was an Australian rules footballer who played with Fitzroy and Hawthorn in the Victorian Football League (VFL).

He was the younger brother of Frank Fleming and twin brother of Ian Fleming.
