= Ian Fleming (Australian footballer, born 1909) =

Australian rules footballer, born 1909

Personal information
- Full name: Ian Corbett Fleming
- Born: 16 November 1909; Kyogle, New South Wales
- Died: 1 November 1984 (aged 74); Camberwell, Victoria
- Original team: Heidelberg
- Height: 180 cm (5 ft 11 in)
- Weight: 82 kg (181 lb)
- Position: Half forward

Playing career^{1}
Years	Club	Games (Goals)
1931–35	Fitzroy	64 (32)
- ^{1} Playing statistics correct to the end of 1935.

Ian Corbett Fleming (16 November 1909 – 1 November 1984) was an Australian rules footballer who played with Fitzroy in the Victorian Football League (VFL).

He was the younger brother of Frank Fleming and twin brother of Keith Fleming.
