= Arthur Roberts (Australian footballer) =

Australian rules footballer (1911–1984)

Personal information
- Full name: Arthur Llewellyn Roberts
- Born: 28 March 1911; Warragul, Victoria
- Died: 8 January 1984 (aged 72); Armadale, Victoria
- Original team: Oakleigh (VFA)
- Height: 178 cm (5 ft 10 in)
- Weight: 76 kg (168 lb)

Playing career^{1}
Years	Club	Games (Goals)
1930–33, 1936	St Kilda	31 (10)
- ^{1} Playing statistics correct to the end of 1936.

Arthur Llewellyn Roberts (28 March 1911 – 8 January 1984) was an Australian rules footballer who played with St Kilda in the Victorian Football League (VFL). He was born in Warragul and recruited from Oakleigh in the Victorian Football Association. His older brother, Billy Roberts, also played for St Kilda.

== Football ==
Roberts survived a life-threatening injury in his debut season to play 31 games for St Kilda over five years.

He started as a 19-year old in the 1930 VFL season and in round 15, against Collingwood at Junction Oval on 23 August, was involved in a collision with an opposition player. Admitted to Alfred Hospital with abdominal injuries described as "grave", he was operated on by doctors and afterwards remained in a critical condition. The injury, to his spleen, was caused by an elbow to his abdomen. On 26 August he was reported to be out of danger.

Still in recovery during the 1931 season, Roberts made only two appearances, in rounds 13 and 18.

In the 1932 season he had fully recovered from his injuries and put together nine games. The Sporting Globe wrote that year that the full-back, with match practice, could develop into a champion player.

Roberts was only able to play four games in 1933, then spent two years out of the side, some of it in Bendigo coaching.

He returned in the 1936 season as a forward and kicked nine goals from his eight appearances. The following year he played practice matches with Melbourne, who were considering him at their full-back. He however instead announced his retirement from VFL football.

He was also a prominent member of the Oakleigh cricket team.

== War Service ==
Roberts later served in the Australian Army during World War II.
