= Ted Pollock =

Australian rules footballer (1913–1973)

Personal information
- Full name: Edward Cullen Pollock
- Born: 10 December 1913; Brunswick North, Victoria
- Died: 8 February 1973 (aged 59); Preston, Victoria
- Original team: Carlton Juniors
- Height: 187 cm (6 ft 2 in)
- Weight: 95.5 kg (211 lb)
- Position: Ruck

Playing career^{1}
Years	Club	Games (Goals)
1930, 1932–37	Carlton	44 (24)
- ^{1} Playing statistics correct to the end of 1937.

Career highlights
- Youngest Ever Player to Play for Carlton FC

Edward Cullen Pollock (10 December 1913 – 8 February 1973) was an Australian rules footballer who played with Carlton in the Victorian Football League (VFL).

Pollock was the youngest ever player for the Carlton Football Club, making his debut as 19th man in round 6, 1930 at 16 years and 200 days old. This record was equalled by Jim Buckley in 1976.

Pollock struggled to establish himself in Carlton's side, never playing more than five successive games in his first four seasons, but he managed to play finals football in both 1935 and 1936. The next season was his last as a player. By his 24th birthday Pollock had played his final VFL game.
