= Mary Eyles Gubbins =

English writer (1818–1887)

- Born: Mary Eyles Egerton; 1818 Backford, Cheshire, England
- Died: 1887 (aged 68–69)
- Occupation: Novelist
- Relatives: Martin Gubbins (brother-in-law)

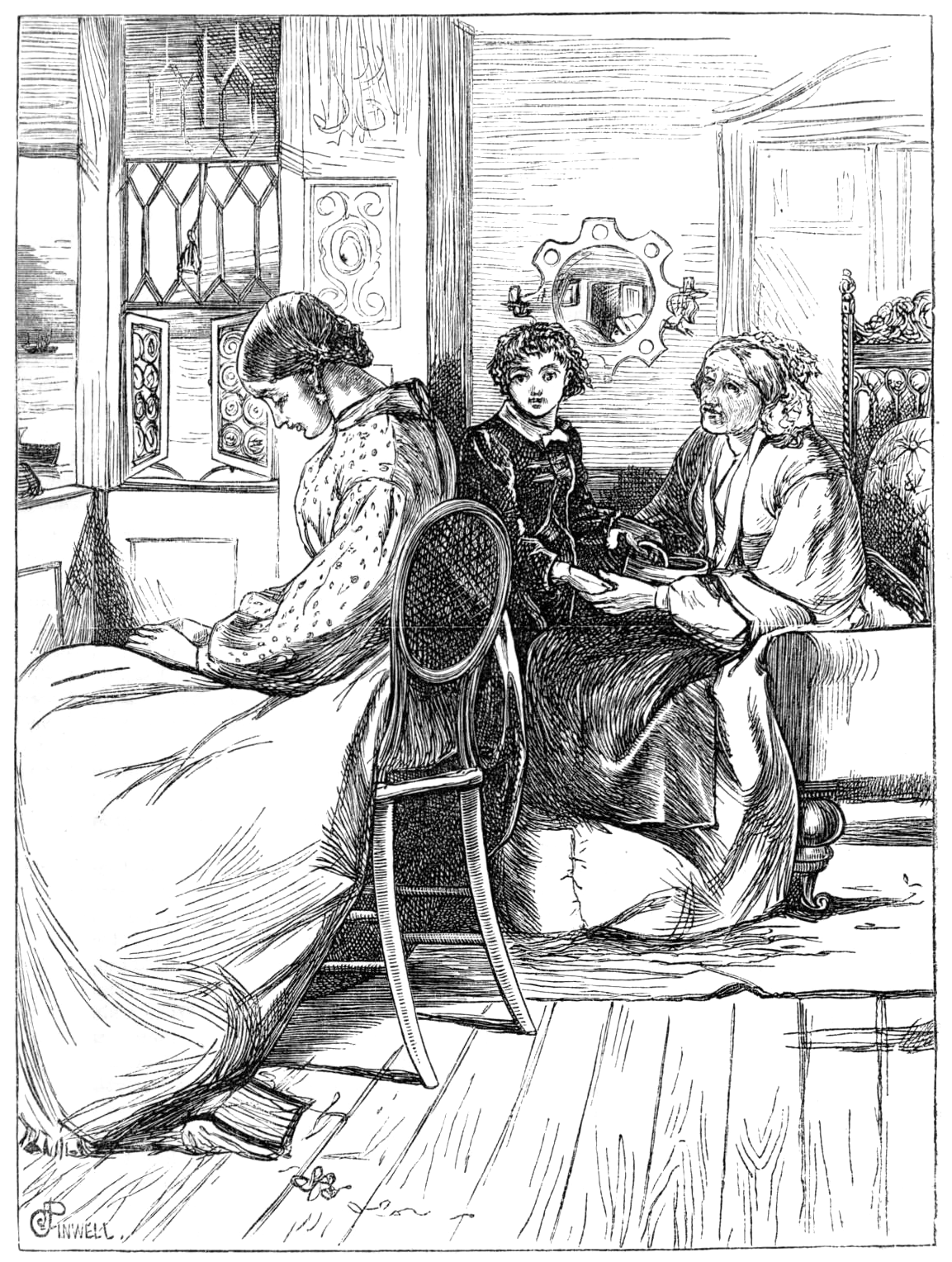
"She cried, very softly, and thought no one saw her." Illustration for the story "Blind" by Mary Eyles Gubbins, which begins with Katherine refusing to marry Michael and ends with her accepting him; in the scene illustrated here, Katherine listens to her brother Harry (who is nine and dying of a lingering illness) tell her and their mother that he has seen Michael and that Michael has gone blind. (Once a Week, volume 8, page 658)

Mary Eyles Gubbins (1818–1887, née Egerton) was a British writer of novels and short stories.

== Personal life ==
Mary Eyles Egerton was born in Backford, Cheshire in 1818. She married John Panton Gubbins, a judge in the Indian civil service, in 1839: John's brother Martin Gubbins played a part in the Siege of Lucknow. She was related by marriage to the novelist Frances Wilbraham.

Upon John Gubbins' retirement, he received a silver box with a coffered lid, engraved on the bottom, from "about 2000 Natives on his leaving Delhi in 1852." In 2013 this was sold for £15,000 at Christie's along with a reproduction of a painting of Mary Eyles and daughter Leila. After his retirement, they lived in Milverton, Warwickshire, where she wrote her novels.

== Writing career ==
Gubbins wrote historical novels, including The Ladye Shakerley (1871) and The Exiles at St. Germains (1874), and contributed to The Argosy. Neither novel was published under her own name: the former was "By a member of the House of Egerton" and the latter "By the author of 'The Ladye Shakerley'", which later led to it being included as an example in a section on the problem of distinguishing between anonymous and pseudonymous works in a 2021 librarianship textbook.

The Pall Mall Gazette reviewed The Ladye Shakerley in April 1871, giving it the title Ye Ladye Shakerley. The reviewer begins by calling it "This charming novelette" but does not favour the lengthy "chronicle of Cheshire worthies" and concludes that:

The present writer will do well next time to leave history alone and keep to invention. She writes gracefully, and has the faculty of placing before others the pictures her own imagination has called up. But she must remember that it is quite as important to know what to leave out as well as what to put in: in "Ye Ladye Shakerley" she has left out too little."

The Athenaeum's reviewer also enjoyed the book but found the historical section over-long:

Whichever "of the House of Egerton" it be that lays claim to the authorship of "The Ladye Shakerley", we congratulate him, or her, on the possession of a very pretty knack of writing. ... it seems to us a pity to destroy the narrative continuity by interpolating a long account, such as might have been taken from a county guidebook, of the royalist families of Cheshire ... We are sure, however, that any reader will cheerfully condone the defect fell better for having passed an hour in the society of Marjory Ladye Shakerley.

The Ladye Shakerley had gone into a second edition by July 1871. In the 1873-1874 volume of Charing Cross magazine there appeared "A Missing Chapter of The Ladye Shakerley: by One of the House of Egerton", although the list of contributors to the volume listed "Mrs Gubbins".

In The Exiles at St. Germains a woman tells her grandchildren stories of her own great-grandmother's days as nurse to the daughter of Mary of Modena, exiled queen of Scotland, living with her husband James II of England at the Château de Saint-Germain-en-Laye near Paris from 1688 onwards. A reviewer in The Academy was unimpressed by The Exiles at St. Germains and concluded that:

The prose of the book, which is better than the verse, is not without an aftertaste of the sweetness of [two other novels] but it is right to warn the reader that it is used to flavour pap.

The publisher's advertisements for The Exiles at St. Germains quoted reviews from The Morning Post which described it as "picturesque, graphic and entertaining as well as moral and pathetic", and The Standard which found it to be:

an excellent attempt to depict the life of the latter Stuarts while they lived under the protection of the Lilies of France ...[it] will be every whit as popular as The Ladye Shakerley,

== Selected publications ==
- The Ladye Shakerley: Being the Record of the Life of a Good and Noble Woman : a Cheshire Story by One of the House of Egerton. London: Hurst and Blackett, Publishers. 1871. Full text available online
- The Exiles at St. Germains: by the author of "The Ladye Shakerley". London: Hurst and Blackett, Publishers. 1874. Full text available online
