= Gubin Do =

Coordinates: 43°57′47″N 19°52′00″E

- Village
- Interactive map of Gubin Do
- Country: Serbia
- District: Zlatibor
- Municipality: Užice

Population (2022)
  - Total: 288
- Time zone: UTC+1 (CET)
  - Summer (DST): UTC+2 (CEST)

Gubin Do (Serbian Cyrillic: Губин До) is a village located in the Užice municipality of Serbia. In the 2022 census, the village had a population of 288.
