= Aleksandr Gubin =

Russian cross-country skier

Personal information
- Nationality: Russian
- Born: 24 August 1935; Alapayevsk, Russian SFSR, Soviet Union
- Died: 2 March 2019 (aged 83)

Sport
- Sport: Cross-country skiing

Aleksandr Gubin (24 August 1935 – 2 March 2019) was a Russian cross-country skier. He competed in the men's 15 kilometre event at the 1960 Winter Olympics.
