= William McNab (cricketer) =

Scottish cricketer (1916–1989)

Personal information
- Full name: William McNab
- Born: 2 October 1916; Edinburgh, Midlothian, Scotland
- Died: 19 November 1989 (aged 73); Edinburgh, Midlothian, Scotland
- Batting: Right-handed
- Role: Wicket-keeper

Domestic team information
- Years: Team
- 1947: Scotland

Career statistics
Competition	First-class
Matches	1
Runs scored	10
Batting average	5.00
100s/50s	–/–
Top score	10
Catches/stumpings	2/–
- Source: Cricinfo, 2 November 2022

William McNab (2 October 1916 – 19 November 1989) was a Scottish first-class cricketer.

McNab was born at Edinburgh in October 1916, where he was educated at George Watson's College. A club cricketer for Watsonians, he made a single appearance in first-class cricket for Scotland against Ireland at Cork in 1947. Playing in the Scottish side as a wicket-keeper, he was dismissed without scoring by James Boucher in the Scotland first innings, while in their second innings he was dismissed for 10 runs by the same bowler. Outside of cricket, McNab was a manager in the insurance industry. He died at Edinburgh in November 1989.
