= Jack Sherman (footballer) =

Australian rules footballer, born 1900

Personal information
- Full name: John Sherman
- Born: 23 September 1900; Kerang, Victoria
- Died: 14 October 1969 (aged 69); Bendigo, Victoria
- Original teams: Bendigo, Chillingollah
- Position: Full Back

Playing career^{1}
Years	Club	Games (Goals)
1925	Footscray	10 (0)
- ^{1} Playing statistics correct to the end of 1925.

Jack Sherman (23 September 1900 – 14 October 1969) was an Australian rules footballer who played with Footscray in the Victorian Football League (VFL) and represented Footscray in its first official VFL match in 1925.

Sherman was also named as the first emergency for Footscray’s 1924 premiership team and for Dame Nellie Melba's 'Championship of Victoria' match against Essendon.

After his one and only season with Footscray, Sherman went on to play with the Preston, Maffra, Traralgon (1930 - losing grand final side) and Stratford Football Clubs and represented the Gippsland League against The Wimmera.

Jack is the brother of Ted Sherman and Bill Sherman.
