= Bertie Sharp =

Australian rules footballer, born 1911

Personal information
- Full name: Albert Edward Sharp
- Born: 20 February 1911; Footscray, Victoria
- Died: 21 September 2006 (aged 95)
- Original team: Railways

Playing career^{1}
Years	Club	Games (Goals)
1930	Footscray	2 (0)
- ^{1} Playing statistics correct to the end of 1930.

Albert Edward 'Bertie' Sharp (20 February 1911 – 21 September 2006) was an Australian rules footballer who played with Footscray in the Victorian Football League (VFL).

Sharp later served in the Australian Army during World War II.
