= Alf Callick (footballer, born 1908) =

Australian rules footballer (1908–1972)

Personal information
- Full name: Alfred Edward Callick
- Born: 24 September 1908
- Died: 4 August 1972 (aged 63)
- Original team: South Melbourne Districts
- Height: 180 cm (5 ft 11 in)
- Weight: 79 kg (174 lb)

Playing career^{1}
Years	Club	Games (Goals)
1930	South Melbourne	1 (2)
1933–37	Fitzroy	37 (6)
Total		38 (8)
- ^{1} Playing statistics correct to the end of 1937.

Alfred Edward Callick (24 September 1908 – 4 August 1972) was an Australian rules footballer who played with South Melbourne and Fitzroy in the Victorian Football League (VFL).

Callick, a recruit from South Melbourne Districts, made just one senior appearance for South Melbourne, in the 1930 VFL season. He remained in the league seconds until he joined Fitzroy, where he played 37 VFL games from 1933 to 1937.
