= Gubino =

Gubino (Russian: Губино) is the name of several rural localities in Russia:

- Gubino, Klinsky District, Moscow Oblast, a village in Klinsky District of Moscow Oblast
- Gubino, Mozhaysky District, Moscow Oblast, a village in Mozhaysky District of Moscow Oblast
- Gubino, Orekhovo-Zuyevsky District, Moscow Oblast, a village in Orekhovo-Zuyevsky District of Moscow Oblast
- Gubino, Shatursky District, Moscow Oblast, a village in Shatursky District of Moscow Oblast
- Gubino, Voskresensky District, Moscow Oblast, a village in Voskresensky District of Moscow Oblast
- Gubino, Novgorod Oblast, a village in Novgorod Oblast
- Gubino, name of several other rural localities
