= Gordon Coulter =

Australian rules footballer

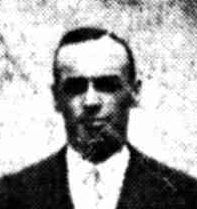

Personal information
- Full name: George Gordon Coulter
- Born: 5 October 1898; Albert Park, Victoria
- Died: 14 November 1971 (aged 73); Toorak, Victoria
- Original team: Queens College / Middle Park

Playing career^{1}
Years	Club	Games (Goals)
1919	Melbourne	8 (2)
- ^{1} Playing statistics correct to the end of 1919.

Gordon Coulter (5 October 1898 – 14 November 1971) was an Australian rules footballer who played with Melbourne in the Victorian Football League (VFL).

Coulter was the originator of the 1930 Coulter Law, which prescribed a maximum payer to VFL players, a racehorse owner, a leading Melbourne golfer, a director of Carlton and United Breweries and the City Mutual Life Assurance Society, and was elected to the Melbourne Council in 1951.
