= Cyril Harley =

Australian rules footballer, born 1910

Personal information
- Full name: Cyril Thomas Patrick Harley
- Born: 10 October 1910; Footscray, Victoria
- Died: 2 December 1950 (aged 40); Footscray, Victoria
- Original team: Footscray District

Playing career^{1}
Years	Club	Games (Goals)
1930	Footscray	1 (0)
- ^{1} Playing statistics correct to the end of 1930.

Cyril Thomas Patrick Harley (10 October 1910 – 2 December 1950) was an Australian rules footballer who played with Footscray in the Victorian Football League (VFL).
