= Rupe Perrett =

Australian rules footballer, born 1909

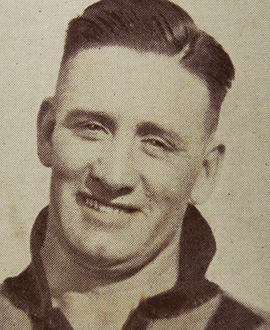
- Perrett in 1931

Personal information
- Full name: Rupert Percival Perrett
- Born: 20 June 1909; Port Melbourne, Victoria
- Died: 16 April 1966 (aged 56); Northcote, Victoria
- Height: 182 cm (6 ft 0 in)
- Weight: 84 kg (185 lb)

Playing career^{1}
| Years | Club | Games (Goals) |
| 1930 | North Melbourne | 5 (0) |
| 1931 | Collingwood | 2 (0) |
| Total | | 7 (0) |
- ^{1} Playing statistics correct to the end of 1931.

Rupert Percival Perrett (20 June 1909 – 16 April 1966) was an Australian rules footballer who played with North Melbourne and Collingwood in the Victorian Football League (VFL).
