= Mattie Rotenberg =

Jewish Canadian journalist

Dr. Mattie Rotenberg
- Born: Margaret Levi; January 30, 1897; Toronto, Ontario, Canada
- Died: November 8, 1989 (aged 92); Toronto, Ontario, Canada
- Education: University of Toronto
- Occupations: Physicist, radio broadcaster, educator
- Spouse: Meyer Rotenberg (1894–1958)
- Children: 5

Mattie "Bub" Rotenberg (née Levi; 1897–1989) was a Jewish Canadian woman who was the first woman and the first Jew to earn a PhD in physics from the University of Toronto in 1926. In 1945 she was awarded the Canadian Women's Press Club Memorial Award for her work in radio journalism. In 1947 she worked for the Canadian Broadcasting Corporation (CBC) to cover sessions of the United Nations Status of Women Commission.

== Early years ==
Mattie Rotenberg was born in Toronto, Ontario, Canada. Rotenberg's parents, Minnie Fleishman (1872–1933) and Paul Levi (1871–1942), immigrated to Canada from present-day Latvia and Russia, respectively.

== Education ==
She attended the University of Toronto where she earned a BA in mathematics and physics in 1921. In 1926 Rotenberg earned a PhD in physics from the University of Toronto, making her the first woman as well as the first Jew to achieve this at that institution. Rotenberg's thesis work, On the Characteristic X-Rays from Light Elements, was published in 1924. Rotenberg continued her work in the field as a physics demonstrator in the University of Toronto physics laboratory from 1941–1968.

Rotenberg was an observant Jew and sought an education for her children that would support her religious beliefs. She was unable find a school to fulfill this to her standards, and as a result she founded Toronto's first Jewish day school, the Hillcrest Progressive School, in 1929.

== Career ==
Rotenberg became a journalist in 1930 when she joined The Jewish Standard as an editor for the column "As the Woman Sees It". In 1939 Rotenberg became a regular commentator for the CBC radio show Trans-Canada Matinée, which was concerned with women's issues. Rotenberg continued in this role until 1966.

In 1947 Rotenberg traveled to Lake Success, New York, and covered sessions of the United Nations Status of Women Commission for the CBC.

== Awards and honours ==
In 1945 Rotenberg was awarded the Canadian Women's Press Club Memorial Award for author of the best radio talk for her work on her show called The Post-War Woman.
