= Gubin Coal Mine =

Coal mine in Gubin, Lubusz Voivodeship, Poland

Gubin coal mine
- Location: Gubin, Lubusz Voivodeship, Poland
- Products: Lignite
- Production: none
- Company: PGE Polska Grupa Energetyczna

The Gubin coal mine was a proposed lignite mine in the west of Poland in Gubin, Lubusz Voivodeship, 350 km west of the capital, Warsaw. The Gubin deposit has estimated reserves of 282.7 million tonnes of coal.

The Gubin mine was never constructed and ceased to appear in PGE's investment plans in 2018.
