= Tibor Székelyhidy =

Hungarian fencer

Personal information
- Born: 20 February 1904 Kolozsvár, Austria-Hungary
- Died: 21 November 1989 (aged 85)

Sport
- Sport: Fencing

Tibor Székelyhidy (20 February 1904 – 21 November 1989) was a Hungarian fencer. He competed in the team épée event at the 1936 Summer Olympics. He is buried in Farkasréti cemetery in Budapest.
