= Frank A. Southard Jr. =

American economist

Frank A. Southard Jr. (January 17, 1907 – November 25, 1989) was a senior official at the International Monetary Fund. He served as the deputy managing director of the fund from 1962 to 1974.

== Early life ==
Southard graduated from Pomona College in 1927. He was awarded a Guggenheim Fellowship in 1940.
