= Selma Gubin =

Russian-born American artist

- Born: 1903; Kiev, Russia
- Died: June 17, 1974 (aged 70–71); New York City

Selma Gubin (1903 – 17 June 1974) was a Russian-born American artist. Her work is included in the collections of the Smithsonian American Art Museum, the Harvard Art Museums and the Hood Museum of Art.
