= Stan Ogden (footballer) =

Australian rules footballer, born 1910

Personal information
- Full name: Stanley Gordon Ogden
- Born: 1 November 1910; Berrigan, New South Wales
- Died: 13 December 1974 (aged 64); Mitcham, Victoria
- Original team: Ringwood / Canterbury
- Height: 185 cm (6 ft 1 in)
- Weight: 76 kg (168 lb)

Playing career^{1}
Years	Club	Games (Goals)
1930	Richmond	1 (0)
1934	Hawthorn	5 (1)
Total		6 (1)
- ^{1} Playing statistics correct to the end of 1934.

Stanley Gordon Ogden (1 November 1910 – 13 December 1974) was an Australian rules footballer who played with Richmond and Hawthorn in the Victorian Football League (VFL).
