= Stan Lawler =

Australian rules footballer (1909–1958)

Personal information
- Full name: Stanley Merton Lawler
- Born: 19 November 1909; Kensington, Victoria
- Died: 26 March 1958 (aged 48); Parkville, Victoria
- Original team: Kensington
- Height: 177 cm (5 ft 10 in)
- Weight: 69 kg (152 lb)

Playing career^{1}
Years	Club	Games (Goals)
1930–31	South Melbourne	2 (6)
1933	Essendon	3 (9)
1934–38	Williamstown (VFA)	62 (212)
1938	Prahran (VFA)	2 (2)
1938–39	Williamstown (VFA)	4 (15)
1939	Preston (VFA)	8 (25)
1940	Yarraville (VFA)	2 (6)
- ^{1} Playing statistics correct to the end of 1940.

Stanley Merton Lawler (19 November 1909 – 26 March 1958) was an Australian rules footballer who played with South Melbourne and Essendon in the Victorian Football League (VFL).

Stan 'Snowy' Lawler was born in Newmarket VIC on 19/11/09 and started his football career with Kensington before being recruited to South Melbourne in 1928 from Preston Seconds. He spent all his time in the Seconds at South before making his senior debut against Fitzroy at Brunswick Street Oval in round 17 of 1930 where he kicked 4 goals. He was omitted for the final round the next week when it was discovered that he had not residentially qualified to play for South.

He played in round 1 of the 1931 season against North Melbourne at Arden Street, kicking two goals but injured his knee and didn't play for the rest of the season.

In 1932 he played with South Camberwell and then was recruited to Essendon in 1933 and played three senior games against South Melbourne at Windy Hill in round 5 (4 goals), against Fitzroy at Brunswick Street in round 6 (4 goals) and against Collingwood at Victoria Park in round 11 (1 goal). He kicked 91 goals in the Seconds during the year.

He transferred to Williamstown in 1934 and made his senior debut at Prahran in round 8 in a 122-point defeat. His debut was delayed due to his disqualification for crossing to South Melbourne from Preston Seconds without a clearance in 1928. He played 7 games and kicked 23 goals in 1934, he played all 18 games in 1935 and kicked 60 goals (second on the VFA list), 16 games in 1936 for 49 goals, all 16 matches in 1937 for 69 goals (the Club record at that stage & third on the VFA list) and 7 games in 1938 for 23 goals. He sought a clearance to Prahran after round 4 of the 1938 season but, after just two senior games with the Two Blues, was back at Williamstown by round 9 but playing in the Seconds.

With the arrival of Soapy Vallence and Tarzan Glass in 1939, opportunities for Stan were scarce, and he departed for Preston after round 1 after kicking 2 goals against Yarraville at Williamstown in the opening round. He played a total of 66 games and kicked 226 goals for the Seagulls and led the Club goalkicking in 1935/1936/1937. He is equal ninth on Williamstown's all-time goalkicking list, behind Ron Todd (672), Mark Fotheringham (571), Ian Rickman (516), Johnny Walker (447), Soapy Vallence (337), Saade Ghazi (291), Danny Del-Re (246), Fred Carpenter (235) and equal with Alby Linton (226).

He went on to play 8 games and kick 25 goals for Preston in 1939 and then played for Yarraville in the first two rounds of 1940, kicking 6 goals. Little is known about him from then; he trained at Carlton during 1940 but did not appear to play a game with either the firsts or seconds. He enlisted in the Army and may have been overseas during the Second World War. He died at Parkville on March 26, 1958, at the age of 48.
