= Len Mills =

Australian rules footballer

Personal information
- Full name: Leonard James Mills
- Born: 8 February 1898; Hyde Park, South Australia
- Died: 16 May 1965 (aged 67); Springfield, South Australia
- Original team: West Torrens
- Height: 203 cm (6 ft 8 in)
- Weight: 86 kg (190 lb)

Playing career^{1}
Years	Club	Games (Goals)
1929	St Kilda	2 (3)
1930	Hawthorn	8 (17)
Total		10 (20)
- ^{1} Playing statistics correct to the end of 1930.

Leonard James "Len" Mills (8 February 1898 – 16 May 1965) was an Australian rules footballer who played with West Torrens in the South Australian National Football League (SANFL) and St Kilda and Hawthorn in the Victorian Football League (VFL).

Mills lied about his age and enlisted to serve in 1915 aged 16 years and nine months. He served in France and returned to Australia in 1919.

Mills, at 203 cm, is believed to have been at the time, the tallest ever VFL player. He was a member of the 1924 West Torrens premiership team and counts games in that's years Hobart Carnival amongst his six interstate appearances.

He played with New Town, a Tasmanian club, in 1926. The next two seasons were spent back at West Torrens.

Already 31 by the time he joined St Kilda in 1929, Mills kicked three goals on his VFL debut, against Fitzroy at Junction Oval. The following season he kicked 17 goals from eight appearances for Hawthorn, which was enough to finish second in the club's goal-kicking behind Bert Hyde.
