= Diego Mayora =

Peruvian footballer (born 1992)

Personal information
- Full name: Diego Armando Mayora Rengifo
- Date of birth: 1 February 1992 (age 34)
- Place of birth: Callería, Peru
- Height: 1.82 m (5 ft 11 1/2 in)
- Position: Centre-forward

Team information
- Current team: Unión Comercio

Senior career*
Years	Team	Apps	(Gls)
- Sport Loreto
2016	Unión Comercio	31	(19)
2016–2018	Colón	1	(0)
2017	→ Deportivo Municipal (loan)	27	(11)
2018	→ Real Garcilaso (loan)	8	(2)
2019	UT Cajamarca	6	(0)
2019	Deportivo Coopsol	12	(3)
2020	Manantay FC		
2020–	Unión Comercio	8	(1)
- * Club domestic league appearances and goals as of 14:18, 14 December 2020 (UTC)

Diego Armando Mayora Rengifo (born 1 February 1992) is a Peruvian professional footballer who plays as a centre-forward for Unión Comercio.

== Club career ==
Mayora featured for Sport Loreto in the 2015 Torneo Descentralizado, after they won the 2014 Copa Perú. He scored four times, the first of which came against UT Cajamarca on 5 May, in sixteen matches as Sport Loreto were relegated. Mayora's last two goals came in a 5–2 loss away to Unión Comercio, a club that signed the forward in January 2016. Nineteen goals followed in eight months, including braces over Comerciantes Unidos, Deportivo Municipal, Defensor La Bocana and Melgar. In August 2016, Mayora joined Argentine Primera División side Colón. He made his bow in September versus Talleres.

That seventeen-minute cameo against Talleres was Mayora's only appearance for Colón, with him spending the majority of his time out on loan. Ahead of the 2017 campaign, Mayora signed for Deportivo Municipal. He was sent off twice across twenty-seven matches but still scored eleven goals as they finished ninth overall. Real Garcilaso completed the loan signing of Mayora in January 2018. He made his continental bow with the club, featuring in three Copa Libertadores matches. Mayora returned to Colón in June but left permanently in December and subsequently moved to UT Cajamarca in 2019.

In early 2020, after three goals in fourteen matches to end 2019 with Deportivo Coopsol, Mayora completed a move to Copa Perú team Manantay FC. He notched a hat-trick on debut against Sport Cahuide. In September, Mayora headed back to the Segunda División to rejoin Unión Comercio. His first appearance came in a defeat away to Chavelines Juniors on 27 October, which preceded his first goal arriving on 18 November against Santos.

== International career ==
In 2016, Mayora was called up to the Peruvian national team by Ricardo Gareca; though wouldn't make a matchday squad.

== Personal life ==
In May 2018, Mayora was arrested for drink-driving.

== Career statistics ==
As of 14 December 2020.

Club statistics
Club	Season	League			Cup		Continental		Other		Total	
Club	Season	Division	Apps	Goals	Apps	Goals	Apps	Goals	Apps	Goals	Apps	Goals
Sport Loreto	2015	Peruvian Primera División	16	4	8	4	—		0	0	24	8
Unión Comercio	2016	Peruvian Primera División	31	19	—		—		0	0	31	19
Colón	2016–17	Argentine Primera División	1	0	0	0	—		0	0	1	0
Colón	2017–18	Argentine Primera División	0	0	0	0	0	0	0	0	0	0
Colón	2018–19	Argentine Primera División	0	0	0	0	0	0	0	0	0	0
Colón	Total		1	0	0	0	0	0	0	0	1	0
Deportivo Municipal (loan)	2017	Peruvian Primera División	27	11	—		0	0	0	0	27	11
Real Garcilaso (loan)	2018	Peruvian Primera División	8	2	—		3 (Note: Appearance(s) in the Copa Libertadores)	0	0	0	11	2
UT Cajamarca	2019	Peruvian Primera División	6	0	0	0	0	0	0	0	6	0
Deportivo Coopsol	2019	Segunda División	12	3	0	0	—		2 (Note: Appearance(s) in the Segunda División play-offs)	0	14	3
Unión Comercio	2020	Segunda División	8	1	0	0	—		0	0	8	1
Career total			109	40	8	4	3	0	2	0	122	44

== Honours ==
Sport Loreto

- Copa Perú: 2014
