= Beatrice Gubbins =

Irish artist (1878–1944)

- Passport photo of Beatrice Gubbins
- Born: 19 September 1878
- Died: 12 August 1944 (aged 65); Dunkettle, Ireland
- Known for: Painting

Beatrice Edith Gubbins (19 September 1878 – 12 August 1944) was an Irish watercolour artist and traveller.

== Early life and family ==
Beatrice Edith Gubbins was born in County Limerick on 19 September 1878. The family moved to Cork in 1883, when her father inherited Wises' Distillery at North Gate, Cork, through his mother's family. She was the youngest child of Thomas Wise Gubbins and Frances Gertrude (née Russell). She had two brothers and four sisters. Her father was a distiller. The Wise Gubbins family purchased the 18th century Dunkathiel House from Jonas Morris around 1870. For many years Dunkathiel House was the home of the five Gubbins sisters, all of whom were deaf, Gubbins received treatment for this in London in 1912 to 1913 which improved her hearing. It is possible that Gubbins attended the Crawford School of Art, Cork, but the records of the time are incomplete. Along with her sisters, Gubbins was active in the community within the church and aiding the poor. The sisters holidayed around Ireland, travelling in the family Daimler.

Gubbins trained as a nurse during World War I, working in the Tivoli hospital, Cork where she nursed injured soldiers that had returned from Europe. From 1916 to 1919 she worked in a hospital in Exeter, England. Returning to Cork in 1919, she nursed her mother, who died in 1927.

== Painting career ==
Her subjects included local scenes drawn on holidays in Ireland, as well as images drawn from her European travels. While living in England, she would cycle to local areas including Devon and Dartmoor to sketch. From the 1920s, Gubbins traveled to Europe, including Italy, France, and Portugal. She traveled internationally to Morocco, the West Indies, Algeria, and Tunis. She also kept journals during her travels. Her last recorded trip was to Portugal in 1934, where she was greatly impressed by the architecture and produced several paintings of the area She exhibited regularly at the Royal Hibernian Academy, from 1897 to 1937, the Belfast Arts Society in 1911 to 13, and regularly with the Watercolour Society of Ireland. She was the honorary secretary of the Queenstown (Cobh) Sketching Club, using the pseudonyms Greyhound or Benjamin. Many of her works may be seen in the former Gubbins' family home, Dunkathiel House, along with her travel journals.

Gubbins died at Dunkathel on 12 August 1944 and is buried on Little Island. Retrospective exhibitions of Gubbins' work were held in 1986 in Crawford Municipal Art Gallery, Cork, and in 1998 in the Lismore Arts Centre, Cappoquin, County Waterford.
