= Jack Holden (footballer) =

Australian rules footballer, born 1910

Personal information
- Full name: John Kenyon Holden
- Born: 7 September 1910; Richmond, Victoria
- Died: 15 December 1976 (aged 66); Reservoir, Victoria
- Height: 184 cm (6 ft 0 in)
- Weight: 86 kg (190 lb)
- Position: Defence

Playing career^{1}
Years	Club	Games (Goals)
1931–34	St Kilda	36 (1)
1935	Geelong	4 (0)
Total		40 (1)
- ^{1} Playing statistics correct to the end of 1935.

John Kenyon Holden (7 September 1910 – 15 December 1976) was an Australian rules footballer who played with St Kilda and Geelong in the Victorian Football League (VFL).
