= Ken Veevers =

Australian rules footballer, born 1909

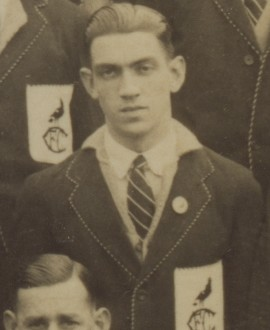
- Veevers in 1929

Personal information
- Full name: Ken Veevers
- Born: 29 July 1909
- Died: 13 February 1973 (aged 63)
- Original team: Northern Districts
- Height: 178 cm (5 ft 10 in)
- Weight: 72 kg (159 lb)

Playing career^{1}
Years	Club	Games (Goals)
1929	Collingwood	1 (0)
1930–32	Fitzroy	18 (2)
Total		19 (2)
- ^{1} Playing statistics correct to the end of 1932.

Ken Veevers (29 July 1909 – 13 February 1973) was a former Australian rules footballer who played with Collingwood and Fitzroy in the Victorian Football League (VFL).
