= Bill Sherman (footballer) =

Australian rules footballer, born 1909

Personal information
- Full name: William Percy Sherman
- Born: 27 July 1909; Kerang, Victoria
- Died: 4 May 1975 (aged 65); Heidelberg, Victoria
- Original team: Chillingollah / Yarraville (VFA)

Playing career^{1}
Years	Club	Games (Goals)
1930–32	Footscray	21 (4)
- ^{1} Playing statistics correct to the end of 1932.

William Percy Sherman (27 July 1909 – 4 May 1975) was an Australian rules footballer who played with Footscray in the Victorian Football League (VFL).

Bill was the brother of Jack Sherman and Ted Sherman.
