= Jim Heenan (footballer, born 1930) =

Australian rules footballer

Personal information
- Full name: Jim P. Heenan, Jr.
- Born: 19 May 1930
- Died: 29 October 1999 (aged 69)
- Original team: Essendon All Blacks
- Height: 173 cm (5 ft 8 in)
- Weight: 76 kg (168 lb)
- Position: Back pocket

Playing career^{1}
Years	Club	Games (Goals)
1952–1957	Essendon	82 (6)
- ^{1} Playing statistics correct to the end of 1957.

Jim P. Heenan (19 May 1930 – 29 October 1999) was an Australian rules footballer who played with Essendon in the Victorian Football League (VFL).

His father, also named Jim, made eight appearances for North Melbourne in 1930.

Heenan had a good debut season at Essendon, winning their award for the best first year player and also polling seven votes in the Brownlow Medal. A back pocket defender, he came off the bench in the 1957 VFL Grand Final, but played in the losing team.
