= Lefty Moses =

American baseball player

- Pitcher
- Born: August 12, 1914; Farmerville, Louisiana, U.S.
- Died: November 23, 1989 (aged 75)
- Threw: Left

Negro league baseball debut
- 1938, for the Kansas City Monarchs

Last appearance
- 1940, for the Kansas City Monarchs

Teams
- Kansas City Monarchs (1938–1940)

Monel Moses (August 12, 1914 – November 23, 1989), nicknamed "Lefty", was an American Negro league pitcher from 1938 to 1940.

A native of Farmerville, Louisiana, Moses made his Negro leagues debut in 1938 for the Kansas City Monarchs. He went on to play with the club through 1940, his final professional season. Moses died in 1989 at age 75.
