= Stan Harris (Australian footballer) =

Australian rules footballer, born 1909

Personal information
- Full name: Stanley William Harris
- Born: 1 March 1909; St Kilda, Victoria
- Died: 20 March 1964 (aged 55); Doncaster East, Victoria
- Original team: Fairfield
- Height: 170 cm (5 ft 7 in)
- Weight: 70 kg (154 lb)

Playing career^{1}
Years	Club	Games (Goals)
1929	Richmond	4 (4)
1930	Footscray	8 (3)
Total		12 (7)
- ^{1} Playing statistics correct to the end of 1930.

Stanley William Harris (1 March 1909 – 20 March 1964) was an Australian rules footballer who played with Richmond and Footscray in the Victorian Football League (VFL).

== Family ==
The son of Charles Ernest Harris (1873-1943), and Florence Harris (1876-1954), née Harris, Stanley William Harris was born at St Kilda, Victoria on 1 March 1909.

He married Jessie Emma Brogan (1914-1959) in 1939.

His brother, John Dennis "Jiggy" Harris (1903-1993), was a VFL footballer with Collingwood and Hawthorn.

== Football ==
=== Richmond (VFL) ===
He played in four First XVIII matches with Richmond in 1929, the first of which was against Footscray, at the Punt Road Oval, on 18 May 1929.

He also played in fourteen Second XVIII matches, including the 1929 Seconds Grand Final team, where (as forward pocket rover) he kicked 3 goals in Richmond's victory over Geelong, 12.8 (80) to 7.15 (57).

=== Footscray (VFL) ===
He cleared from Richmond to Footscray on 2 May 1930, and played in eight games with Footscray's First XVIII in that year.

== Death ==
He died at Doncaster East, Victoria on 20 March 1964.
