= Bill Cutler (footballer) =

Australian rules footballer, born 1900

Personal information
- Full name: William Percival Cutler
- Born: 29 July 1900; Bowenvale, Victoria
- Died: 13 August 1969 (aged 69); Repatriation General Hospital, Heidelberg
- Original team: Ballarat
- Height: 184 cm (6 ft 0 in)
- Weight: 90 kg (198 lb)
- Position: Rover

Playing career^{1}
Years	Club	Games (Goals)
1930–31	Melbourne	22 (6)
- ^{1} Playing statistics correct to the end of 1931.

William Percival Cutler (29 July 1900 – 13 August 1969) was an Australian rules footballer who played with Melbourne in the Victorian Football League (VFL).

== Family ==
The son of George Phillip Cutler, and Julia Cutler, née Baker, William Percival Cutler was born at Bowenvale (near Timor), Victoria on 29 July 1900.

He married Cecelia Maria Drummy (1900–1969) in 1923.

He died at the Repatriation General Hospital, Heidelberg on 13 August 1969.

== Football ==
=== Melbourne ===
Recruited from Ballarat, he played his first match (at the age of 29) for Melbourne against South Melbourne on 3 May 1930 in round one of the 1930 VFL season.

He played in the first fifteen matches of the 1930 season. On 23 August 1930, in the round fifteen match against Carlton, he was reported for three separate offences. He was found guilty of two of the three charges, and was suspended for a total of 12 matches:

- Striking Dinny Kelleher. The charge was sustained and Cutler was suspended for eight matches. (Kelleher was also reported for striking Cutler, and was also suspended for eight matches.)
- Attempting to strike Alex Duncan. The charge was sustained and Cutler was suspended for four matches.
- Attempting to strike Fred Gilby. The charge against Cutler was not sustained.

Former champion ruckman Jumbo Sharland's review of Melbourne's 1930 season had this to say of Cutler:

The big weakness in the Melbourne work last season was the ruck play. A lion in the ruck was Cutler, a big burly fellow, who was not afraid to use his shoulders to advantage. At times he was near the border-line as regards roughness. At present he is under disqualification, but will be available again. Cutler proved a valuable shepherder.

He played another seven senior matches for Melbourne in 1931, once he was free from his suspension.

=== Carlton ===
Although he was cleared from Melbourne to Carlton in 1932, he never played for Carlton.

== Military service ==
He enlisted in the Second AIF in October 1939, and was discharged from the army (on medical grounds) in January 1943.
