= Ken Mackie =

Australian rules footballer, born 1911

Personal information
- Full name: Kenneth Lawrence Mackie
- Born: 19 February 1911; Heidelberg, Victoria
- Died: 7 October 1982 (aged 71); Prahran, Victoria
- Original team: Heidelberg
- Height: 184 cm (6 ft 0 in)
- Weight: 81 kg (179 lb)
- Position: Half Forward

Playing career^{1}
Years	Club	Games (Goals)
1930–31	Fitzroy	7 (15)
1933–38	St Kilda	62 (55)
Total		69 (70)
- ^{1} Playing statistics correct to the end of 1938.

Kenneth Lawrence Mackie (19 February 1911 – 7 October 1982) was an Australian rules footballer who played with Fitzroy and St Kilda in the Victorian Football League (VFL).
