= Ted Sherman (footballer) =

Australian rules footballer

Personal information
- Full name: Edward Thomas Sherman
- Born: 30 August 1902; Kerang, Victoria
- Died: 1 July 1987 (aged 84); Bendigo, Victoria
- Original teams: Chillingollah, Yarraville
- Position: Forward

Playing career^{1}
Years	Club	Games (Goals)
1925, 1931–33	Footscray	41 (1)
- ^{1} Playing statistics correct to the end of 1933.

Career highlights
- 1932 Victorian State of Origin squad

Edward Thomas Sherman (30 August 1902 – 1 July 1987) was an Australian rules footballer who played with Footscray in the Victorian Football League (VFL).

Ted is the brother of Jack Sherman and Bill Sherman.
