= Les Deaton =

American basketball player and coach

Personal information
- Born: September 23, 1923 Carlisle, Iowa
- Died: November 18, 1989 (aged 66) Des Moines, Iowa
- Listed height: 6 ft 4 in (1.93 m)
- Listed weight: 210 lb (95 kg)

Career information
- High school: Lorimor (Lorimor, Iowa)
- College: Simpson (1941–1943); Denison (1943–1944); Simpson (1946–1947)
- NBA draft: 1947: undrafted
- Position: Forward / center

Career history

Playing
- 1947–1948: Sheboygan Red Skins
- 1948–1949: Waterloo Hawks

Coaching
- 1950–1951: Belle Plaine HS
- 195?–195?: Columbus Junction HS
- 1955–1967: Simpson

Leslie Hobart Deaton (September 23, 1923 – November 18, 1989) was an American professional basketball player and college head coach. After serving in World War II, he played in the National Basketball League the Sheboygan Red Skins and Waterloo Hawks and averaged 3.7 points per game for his career. Deaton also coached high school basketball in Iowa and then became the head coach at Simpson College for twelve seasons, where he played collegiately. Upon the close of his coaching career, he operated an insurance company and ran a campground before dying of a stroke in 1989.
