= Gerald McKenzie =

Australian rules footballer, born 1904

Personal information
- Full name: Gerald Michael McKenzie
- Born: 13 January 1904; Rushworth, Victoria
- Died: 23 September 1977 (aged 73); Bendigo, Victoria
- Original team: South Bendigo
- Height: 185 cm (6 ft 1 in)

Playing career^{1}
Years	Club	Games (Goals)
1930	Fitzroy	18 (0)
- ^{1} Playing statistics correct to the end of 1930.

Gerald Michael McKenzie (13 January 1904 – 23 September 1977) was an Australian rules footballer who played with Fitzroy in the Victorian Football League (VFL).

== Family ==
The son of John Charles Ross McKenzie (1869-1948), and Bridget Teresa McKenzie (1872-1968), née O'Dwyer, Gerald Michael McKenzie was born at Rushworth, Victoria on 13 January 1904.

He married Agnes Frayne Gerber (1914-1997) in 1939.

== Football ==
Recruited from South Bendigo Football Club in the Bendigo Football League, with whom he had played for five seasons (1925-1929).

He returned to South Bendigo, as captain-coach, in 1931.
