= Jim Heenan (footballer, born 1906) =

Australian rules footballer, born 1906

Personal information
- Born: 18 June 1906
- Died: 23 July 1981 (aged 75)
- Original team: Northcote
- Height: 175 cm (5 ft 9 in)
- Weight: 80 kg (176 lb)

Playing career^{1}
| Years | Club | Games (Goals) |
| 1930 | North Melbourne | 8 (1) |
- ^{1} Playing statistics correct to the end of 1930.

Jim Heenan (18 June 1906 – 23 July 1981) was an Australian rules footballer who played with North Melbourne in the Victorian Football League (VFL).

Heenan was a member of Northcote's 1929 VFA premiership team.

He spent the 1930 VFL season with North Melbourne. In round nine, his seventh league appearance, he was reported for striking Richmond player Bert Foster with his elbow, for which he received an eight-game suspension. His return, in round 18, would be his final appearances for North Melbourne.

Later in the decade, Heenan played for the Sunshine Football Club.

His son, Jim P. Heenan, played for Essendon in the 1950s.
