= John Harris (Australian footballer) =

Australian rules footballer, born 1903

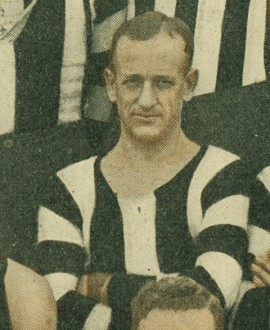
- Harris during his Collingwood career

Personal information
- Full name: John Dennis Harris
- Born: 4 November 1903; Mildura, Victoria
- Died: 29 June 1993 (aged 89); Camberwell, Victoria
- Original team: Brighton (VFA)
- Height: 165 cm (5 ft 5 in)
- Weight: 63 kg (139 lb)

Playing career^{1}
Years	Club	Games (Goals)
1925–1929	Collingwood	88 (48)
1930–1931	Hawthorn	34 (10)
Total		122 (58)

Coaching career
Years	Club	Games (W–L–D)
1930–1931	Hawthorn	36 (9–27–0)
- ^{1} Playing statistics correct to the end of 1931.

John Dennis 'Jiggy' Harris (4 November 1903 – 29 June 1993) was an Australian rules footballer who played with Collingwood and Hawthorn in the VFL.

== Family ==
The son of Charles Ernest Harris (1873–1943), and Florence Harris (1876–1954), née Harris, John Dennis Harris was born at Mildura, Victoria on 4 November 1903.

His brother, Stanley William Harris (1909–1964), was a VFL footballer with Richmond and Footscray.

== Football ==
Recruited from Brighton, Harris started his career at Collingwood where he played as both a wingman and half forward flanker. He was a member of Collingwood premiership sides in 1927 and 1928. After being dropped for the 1929 Grand Final, thus missing out on a third successive premiership, Harris left Collingwood and joined Hawthorn as captain-coach. He spent two seasons with Hawthorn before joining VFA club Coburg where he played in a losing grand final in 1933.
