= Arthur Smith (footballer, born 1908) =

Australian rules footballer, born 1908

Personal information
- Full name: Arthur Smith
- Born: 7 June 1908
- Died: 6 September 1987 (aged 79)
- Original team: Essendon Reserves

Playing career^{1}
Years	Club	Games (Goals)
1930	Footscray	3 (5)
1930	North Melbourne	2 (0)
Total		5 (5)
- ^{1} Playing statistics correct to the end of 1930.

Arthur Smith (7 June 1908 – 6 September 1987) was an Australian rules footballer who played for the Footscray Football Club and North Melbourne Football Club in the Victorian Football League (VFL).
