= Webber Jackson =

Australian rules footballer, born 1909

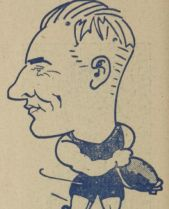

Personal information
- Full name: Wilbur Thomas Jackson
- Born: 2 December 1909; Ballarat East, Victoria
- Died: 21 January 2005 (aged 95)
- Original team: Ballarat
- Height: 180 cm (5 ft 11 in)
- Weight: 87 kg (192 lb)
- Position: Ruck

Playing career^{1}
Years	Club	Games (Goals)
1930–32	Melbourne	24 (5)
- ^{1} Playing statistics correct to the end of 1932.

Wilbur Thomas Jackson (2 December 1909 – 21 January 2005) was an Australian rules footballer who played with Melbourne in the Victorian Football League (VFL).
