= Edwin Pemberton =

Australian rules footballer, born 1908

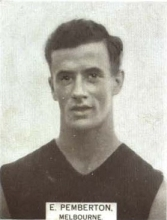

Personal information
- Full name: Edwin Clarence Pemberton
- Born: 20 June 1908; Longwarry, Victoria
- Died: 4 November 1989 (aged 81)
- Original team: Sale
- Position: Wing

Playing career^{1}
Years	Club	Games (Goals)
1930–34	Melbourne	45 (5)
- ^{1} Playing statistics correct to the end of 1934.

Edwin Clarence Pemberton (20 June 1908 – 4 November 1989) was an Australian rules footballer who played with Melbourne in the Victorian Football League (VFL).

Pemberton later served in the Australian Army during World War II.
