= Teddy Jones =

Australian rules footballer

Personal information
- Full name: Edward Hector Jones
- Born: 6 March 1910; Narrandera, New South Wales
- Died: 30 November 1989 (aged 79)
- Original team: Chilwell
- Height: 171 cm (5 ft 7 in)
- Weight: 75 kg (165 lb)

Playing career^{1}
Years	Club	Games (Goals)
1930	Geelong	1 (0)
- ^{1} Playing statistics correct to the end of 1930.

Edward Hector Jones (6 March 1910 – 30 November 1989) was an Australian rules footballer who played with Geelong in the Victorian Football League (VFL).
