= Harry Challis =

Australian rules footballer, born 1906

Personal information
- Full name: Henry George Francis Challis
- Born: 19 April 1906; Queenscliff, Victoria
- Died: 25 November 1989 (aged 83); Highett, Victoria

Playing career^{1}
Years	Club	Games (Goals)
1930	Fitzroy	3 (0)
- ^{1} Playing statistics correct to the end of 1930.

Harry Challis (19 April 1906 – 25 November 1989) was an Australian rules footballer who played with Fitzroy in the Victorian Football League (VFL).
