= Billy Roberts (Australian footballer) =

Australian rules footballer, born 1908

Personal information
- Full name: William Charles Roberts
- Born: 4 December 1908; Warragul, Victoria
- Died: 16 May 1998 (aged 89); Glen Huntly, Victoria
- Original team: Wesley College / Oakleigh
- Height: 178 cm (5 ft 10 in)
- Weight: 74 kg (163 lb)

Playing career^{1}
Years	Club	Games (Goals)
1928–1937	St Kilda	160 (6)
- ^{1} Playing statistics correct to the end of 1937.

William Charles Roberts (4 December 1908 – 16 May 1998) was an Australian rules footballer who played with St Kilda in the Victorian Football League (VFL).

Roberts played at Wesley College and was recruited to St Kilda from Oakleigh. His younger brother Arthur Roberts also played for St Kilda.

He was used on the wing until 1930, when he replaced Barney Carr as St Kilda's centreman.

Roberts represented Victoria on six occasions.

Roberts later served in the Australian Army during World War II.
