= Enriqueta Mayora =

Mexican fencer

Personal information
- Born: 15 February 1921 Mexico City, Mexico
- Died: 9 November 1989 (aged 68)

Sport
- Sport: Fencing

Enriqueta Mayora (15 February 1921 – 9 November 1989) was a Mexican fencer. She competed in the women's individual foil event at the 1948 Summer Olympics.
