= Jack George (footballer) =

Australian rules footballer, born 1910

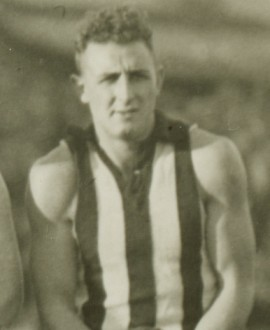
- George during his Collingwood career

Personal information
- Full name: Walter Edward John George
- Born: 20 April 1910; Caulfield, Victoria
- Died: 14 April 2000 (aged 89)
- Original team: Williamstown
- Height: 178 cm (5 ft 10 in)
- Weight: 81 kg (179 lb)

Playing career^{1}
Years	Club	Games (Goals)
1930–1931	Collingwood	7 (0)
1931–1935	St Kilda	55 (3)
1936	South Melbourne	11 (1)
Total		73 (4)
- ^{1} Playing statistics correct to the end of 1936.

Walter Edward John George (20 April 1910 – 14 April 2000) was an Australian rules footballer who played with Collingwood, St Kilda and South Melbourne in the Victorian Football League (VFL).

George, who played his football as a defender and ruckman, began his career at Collingwood in 1930, the year they won their record fourth successive premiership. He however took no part in the finals series.

He struggled to put together regular games until 1933, when he made 16 appearances for St Kilda.
