= Tommy Gubbins =

Australian rules footballer, born 1907

Personal information
- Full name: Tommy Gubbins
- Born: 7 July 1907
- Died: 23 September 1976 (aged 69)
- Original team: Williamstown CYMS (CYMSFA)

Playing career^{1}
Years	Club	Games (Goals)
1930–31	Essendon	17 (1)
- ^{1} Playing statistics correct to the end of 1931.

Tommy Gubbins (7 July 1907 – 23 September 1976) was an Australian rules footballer who played with Essendon in the Victorian Football League (VFL). Before being recruited by the Bombers, Gubbins played in Williamstown CYMS's 1928 CYMS Football Association premiership side. After leaving Essendon, he went to Carwarp near Mildura and then Mordialloc in the Federal Football League (FFL) before playing three games with Williamstown in the Victorian Football Association (VFA) in 1936.
