= Frank Fleming (Australian footballer) =

Australian rules footballer (1907–1963)

Personal information
- Full name: Frank Fleming
- Born: 15 March 1907
- Died: 29 December 1963 (aged 56)

Playing career^{1}
Years	Club	Games (Goals)
1931	Fitzroy	2 (1)
- ^{1} Playing statistics correct to the end of 1931.

Frank Fleming (15 March 1907 – 29 December 1963) was an Australian rules footballer who played with Fitzroy in the Victorian Football League (VFL).
