= Martin Gubbins =

British official in India; involved in Siege of Lucknow

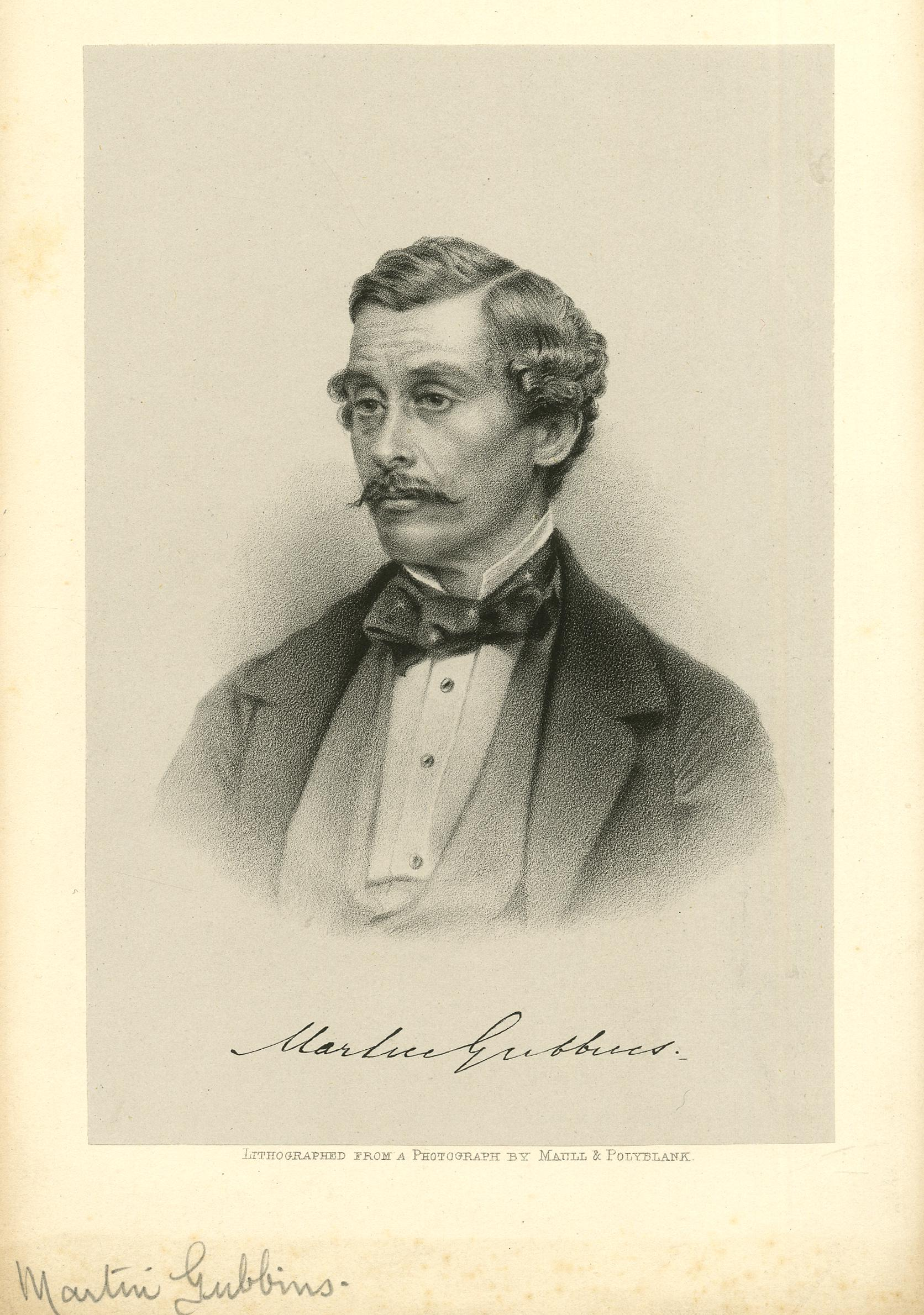
Martin Gubbins

Martin Richard Gubbins (1812–1863) was a British official in India. He is known for his part in the Siege of Lucknow, where he was at odds with the commanding officer, Henry Montgomery Lawrence.

== Early life ==
He was the third son of Major-General Joseph Gubbins and his wife Charlotte Bathoe (died 1824). He was educated at the East India College, Haileybury from 1828 to 1830. Three brothers were also in British India: John Panton Gubbins the eldest, Charles and Frederick Bebb Gubbins. His sister Elizabeth married William Beauclerk, 9th Duke of St Albans and then Lucius Cary, 10th Viscount Falkland.

Gubbins went out to India as writer in 1830, and became assistant under the chief commissioner and resident at Delhi, 26 April 1831. He subsequently held posts at Allahabad, Muttra, and other places, and went to Awadh on its annexation by Lord Dalhousie in 1856 as a member of the British commission.

During the cold season of 1856–1857, Gubbins made a tour as financial commissioner through Awadh, to test the summary settlement of the land revenue, which had just then been completed. He worked to redress grievances of the landowners; but at the same time his disputes with Colville Coverley Jackson, the chief commissioner, were counter-productive.

== Indian Rebellion 1857 ==
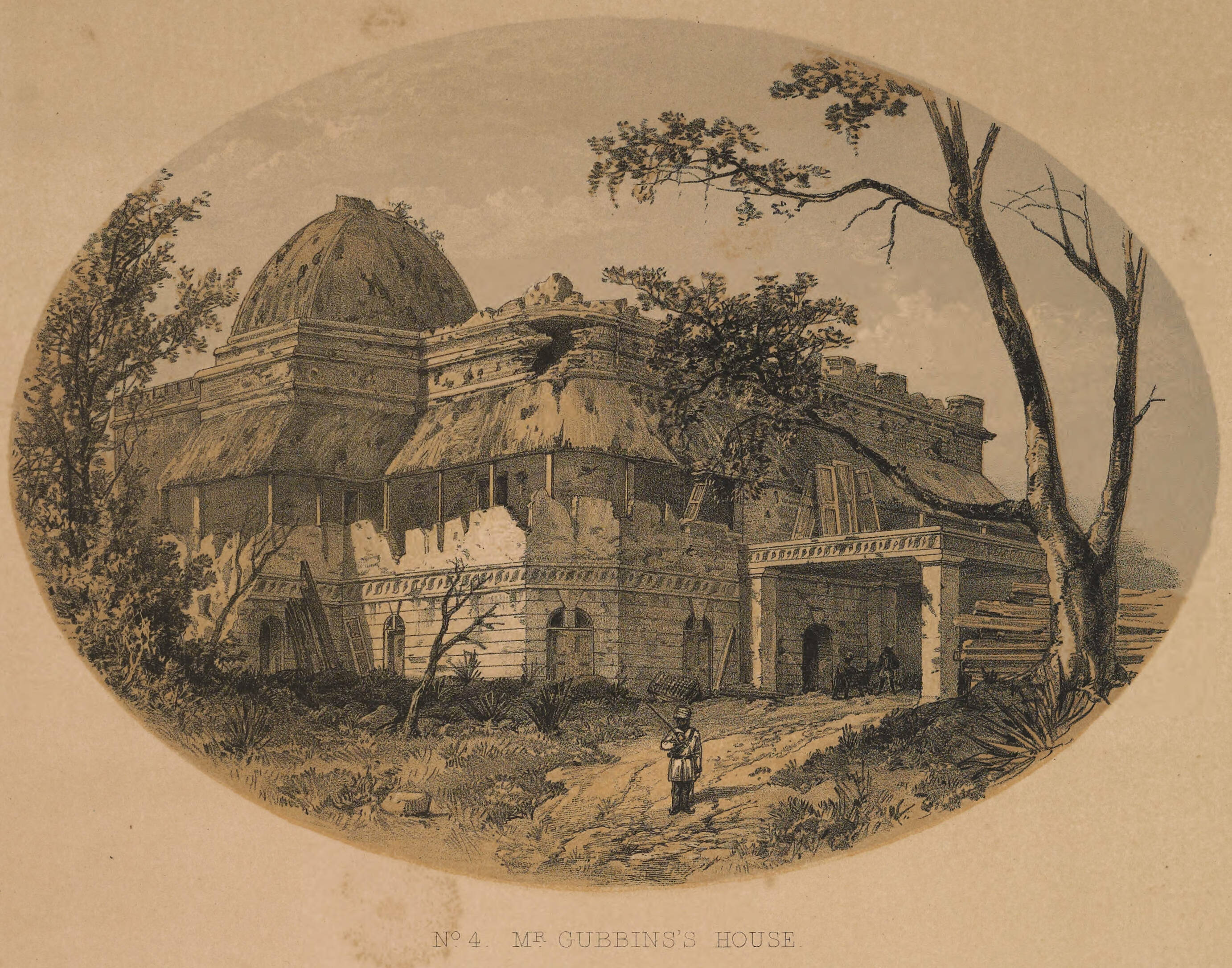
Gubbins's House at Lucknow

During the Indian Rebellion of 1857, Gubbins took a prominent part in affairs at Lucknow, and from the beginning managed the intelligence department until the British position was beleaguered. By his advice the residency was garrisoned only with European troops. He urged Sir Henry Lawrence to send a reinforcement to aid Sir Hugh Wheeler, and when this was refused he tried in vain to dissuade Wheeler from entrusting to Nana Sahib of Kanpur the protection of the treasury.

From the beginning of the insurgency, Gubbins urged on Lawrence the disarmament of the sepoys at Lucknow. His advice was not taken, and on 30 May 1857 most of the troops rose in revolt. On the following morning the 7th native cavalry also revolted, and in the pursuit which took place Gubbins, with his servant and two followers, took six prisoners. On 9 June 1857, Gubbins was appointed head of a provisional council during the absence of Sir Henry Lawrence through ill-health, and proceeded to carry out his scheme of disarmament of the remaining sepoys. His orders were, however, countermanded by Lawrence on his return a few days later.

Gubbins advised an attack on the rebel troops in the neighborhood of Lucknow; but when Lawrence consented, the attack was botched. The result was the disaster at the battle of Chinhut on 30 June 1857, which led to the siege of Lucknow. Lawrence died on 4 July 1857. It left Gubbins as the senior official in the city.

Sir Colin Campbell began to relieve Lucknow on 9 November 1857, reaching the Residency after a week of fighting. Gubbins accompanied Campbell's forces to Kanpur. In poor health, Gubbins then sailed back to England.

== Later life ==
Returning to India at the end of 1858, Gubbins found his reputation had suffered. The situation in Awadh was much analysed in the aftermath of the insurgency, and the group of followers of James Thomason there in 1856, Colville Calverley Jackson and Charles John Wingfield as well as Gubbins, came under scrutiny. Gubbins had tried to deal more sympathetically with the taluqdars, whose discontent with change had caused a revolt. Although Henry Lawrence had had some sympathy for the approach taken by Gubbins to land reform, and also found Jackson unacceptable, Gubbins was tarred with a long history of quarrels, and the fact that Lawrence had found him troublesome. His Mutinies in Oudh was found self-serving, and was rebutted, by George Hutchinson (1826–1899) of the Bengal Engineers, in Narrative of the Mutinies in Oude. Hutchinson was commissioned by Robert Montgomery, brought in to be Chief Commissioner of Oudh, over Gubbins's head.

Gubbins became judge of the supreme court of Agra. He resigned due to ill-health, and returned to England in January 1863. After his return he suffered from mental depression, and committed suicide at Leamington on 6 May in that year.

== Works ==
An account of the mutinies in Oudh which Gubbins prepared during the siege of Lucknow he sent in two parts to England for publication. The steamer conveying one of these parts, which contained an account of Havelock's campaign written by his son, was wrecked, and that part was rewritten by Gubbins on his arrival in England in 1857. The Mutinies in Oudh was published in June 1858, and reached a third edition in October of the same year.

== Family ==
Gubbins married Harriet Louisa Nepean, a granddaughter of Evan Nepean. Their eldest son was John Harington Gubbins.
