= 1930 VFL season =

34th season of the Victorian Football League (VFL)

1930 VFL premiership season
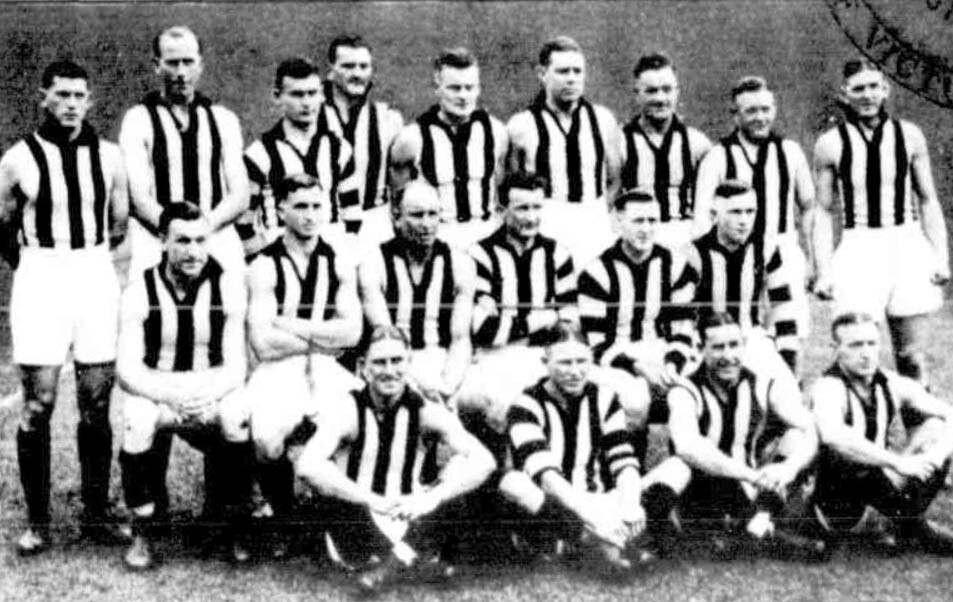
- Collingwood 1930 VFL premiership team

Overview
- Date: 3 May – 11 October 1930
- Teams: 12
- Premiers: Collingwood; 9th premiership
- Runners-up: Geelong; 2nd runners-up result
- Minor premiers: Collingwood; 12th minor premiership
- Brownlow Medallist: Harry Collier (Collingwood); Allan Hopkins (Footscray); Stan Judkins (Richmond); 4 votes
- Leading goalkicker medallist: Gordon Coventry (Collingwood); 105 goals

Attendance
- Matches played: 112
- Total attendance: 1,876,678 (16,756 per match)
- Highest (H&A): 40,000 (round 10, Carlton v Collingwood)
- Highest (finals): 47,985 (grand final, Collingwood v Geelong)

The 1930 VFL season was the 34th season of the Victorian Football League (VFL), the highest-level senior Australian rules football competition in Victoria. The season featured twelve clubs and ran from 3 May to 11 October, comprising an 18-match home-and-away season followed by a four-week finals series featuring the top four clubs.

Collingwood won the premiership, defeating Geelong by 30 points in the 1930 VFL grand final; it was Collingwood's fourth consecutive premiership, the only time in the league's history that a club has won four consecutive premierships, and ninth VFL premiership overall. Collingwood also won the minor premiership by finishing atop the home-and-away ladder with a 15–3 win–loss record. Collingwood's Harry Collier, Footscray's Allan Hopkins and Richmond's Stan Judkins tied for the Brownlow Medal as the league's best and fairest players, and Collingwood's Gordon Coventry won his fifth consecutive leading goalkicker medal as the league's leading goalkicker, becoming the first player to win the award five times consecutively.

== Background ==
=== Format ===
In 1930, the VFL competition consisted of twelve teams of 18 on-the-field players each, plus one substitute player, known as the 19th man. A player could be substituted for any reason, Once he had been substituted, a player could not return to the field of play under any circumstances. Teams played each other in a home-and-away season of 18 rounds; matches 12 to 18 were the "home-and-way reverse" of matches 5 to 11 (i.e., the last seven matches of the round). Once the 18 round home-and-away season had finished, the 1930 VFL Premiers were determined by the specific format and conventions of the amended "Argus system".

== Home-and-away season ==
=== Round 1 ===
Home team	Home team score	Away team	Away team score	Venue	Crowd	Date
Hawthorn	16.7 (103)	St Kilda	14.8 (92)	Glenferrie Oval	18,000	3 May 1930
Geelong	18.13 (121)	North Melbourne	2.7 (19)	Corio Oval	9,500	3 May 1930
Fitzroy	12.14 (86)	Footscray	11.6 (72)	Brunswick Street Oval	18,500	3 May 1930
South Melbourne	9.16 (70)	Melbourne	13.17 (95)	Lake Oval	16,000	3 May 1930
Richmond	7.18 (60)	Collingwood	10.14 (74)	Punt Road Oval	32,000	3 May 1930
Essendon	7.9 (51)	Carlton	8.10 (58)	Windy Hill	26,000	3 May 1930

=== Round 2 ===
Home team	Home team score	Away team	Away team score	Venue	Crowd	Date
St Kilda	16.10 (106)	South Melbourne	11.12 (78)	Junction Oval	21,500	10 May 1930
Collingwood	11.12 (78)	Hawthorn	10.10 (70)	Victoria Park	19,000	10 May 1930
Carlton	17.14 (116)	Richmond	7.5 (47)	Princes Park	35,000	10 May 1930
Melbourne	14.16 (100)	Geelong	8.15 (63)	MCG	14,909	10 May 1930
North Melbourne	6.9 (45)	Fitzroy	9.11 (65)	Arden Street Oval	9,000	10 May 1930
Footscray	10.14 (74)	Essendon	9.4 (58)	Western Oval	18,000	10 May 1930

=== Round 3 ===
Home team	Home team score	Away team	Away team score	Venue	Crowd	Date
Geelong	10.10 (70)	St Kilda	9.6 (60)	Corio Oval	13,000	17 May 1930
Fitzroy	15.9 (99)	Melbourne	15.14 (104)	Brunswick Street Oval	20,000	17 May 1930
North Melbourne	11.8 (74)	Footscray	16.20 (116)	Arden Street Oval	13,000	17 May 1930
Richmond	10.17 (77)	Essendon	12.7 (79)	Punt Road Oval	16,000	17 May 1930
South Melbourne	12.12 (84)	Collingwood	16.19 (115)	Lake Oval	18,000	17 May 1930
Hawthorn	10.12 (72)	Carlton	13.9 (87)	Glenferrie Oval	28,000	17 May 1930

=== Round 4 ===
Home team	Home team score	Away team	Away team score	Venue	Crowd	Date
Melbourne	18.15 (123)	North Melbourne	15.12 (102)	MCG	8,662	24 May 1930
Footscray	9.10 (64)	Richmond	14.7 (91)	Western Oval	20,000	24 May 1930
Essendon	14.12 (96)	Hawthorn	8.13 (61)	Windy Hill	15,000	24 May 1930
Collingwood	10.12 (72)	Geelong	12.18 (90)	Victoria Park	17,000	24 May 1930
Carlton	20.18 (138)	South Melbourne	11.18 (84)	Princes Park	21,000	24 May 1930
St Kilda	15.18 (108)	Fitzroy	8.10 (58)	Junction Oval	26,000	24 May 1930

=== Round 5 ===
Home team	Home team score	Away team	Away team score	Venue	Crowd	Date
North Melbourne	14.15 (99)	St Kilda	10.11 (71)	Arden Street Oval	12,000	31 May 1930
Hawthorn	8.11 (59)	Richmond	11.11 (77)	Glenferrie Oval	18,000	31 May 1930
Melbourne	17.18 (120)	Footscray	9.8 (62)	MCG	16,975	31 May 1930
South Melbourne	6.15 (51)	Essendon	15.14 (104)	Lake Oval	18,000	31 May 1930
Fitzroy	10.11 (71)	Collingwood	9.12 (66)	Brunswick Street Oval	21,000	31 May 1930
Geelong	8.10 (58)	Carlton	10.6 (66)	Corio Oval	15,500	31 May 1930

=== Round 6 ===
Home team	Home team score	Away team	Away team score	Venue	Crowd	Date
Footscray	8.9 (57)	Hawthorn	8.8 (56)	Western Oval	9,000	7 June 1930
Collingwood	15.24 (114)	North Melbourne	8.9 (57)	Victoria Park	10,000	7 June 1930
Carlton	17.16 (118)	Fitzroy	6.12 (48)	Princes Park	30,000	7 June 1930
Richmond	11.15 (81)	South Melbourne	9.12 (66)	Punt Road Oval	16,000	9 June 1930
Essendon	16.11 (107)	Geelong	9.12 (66)	Windy Hill	20,000	9 June 1930
St Kilda	11.10 (76)	Melbourne	10.7 (67)	Junction Oval	29,000	9 June 1930

=== Round 7 ===
Home team	Home team score	Away team	Away team score	Venue	Crowd	Date
Geelong	9.15 (69)	Richmond	10.10 (70)	Corio Oval	9,500	14 June 1930
Footscray	7.14 (56)	St Kilda	10.12 (72)	Western Oval	15,000	14 June 1930
South Melbourne	17.11 (113)	Hawthorn	9.10 (64)	Lake Oval	11,000	14 June 1930
Fitzroy	13.13 (91)	Essendon	16.10 (106)	Brunswick Street Oval	15,000	14 June 1930
Melbourne	11.13 (79)	Collingwood	14.13 (97)	MCG	28,779	14 June 1930
North Melbourne	9.9 (63)	Carlton	15.23 (113)	Arden Street Oval	15,000	14 June 1930

=== Round 8 ===
Home team	Home team score	Away team	Away team score	Venue	Crowd	Date
Essendon	11.11 (77)	North Melbourne	8.8 (56)	Windy Hill	13,000	21 June 1930
Collingwood	22.11 (143)	St Kilda	14.8 (92)	Victoria Park	15,000	21 June 1930
Carlton	9.16 (70)	Melbourne	9.18 (72)	Princes Park	30,000	21 June 1930
Hawthorn	9.18 (72)	Geelong	6.11 (47)	Glenferrie Oval	8,000	21 June 1930
South Melbourne	15.19 (109)	Footscray	8.12 (60)	Lake Oval	12,000	21 June 1930
Richmond	14.16 (100)	Fitzroy	10.12 (72)	Punt Road Oval	14,000	21 June 1930

=== Round 9 ===
Home team	Home team score	Away team	Away team score	Venue	Crowd	Date
North Melbourne	5.13 (43)	Richmond	14.20 (104)	Arden Street Oval	11,000	28 June 1930
Geelong	14.12 (96)	South Melbourne	11.6 (72)	Corio Oval	9,000	28 June 1930
Fitzroy	18.11 (119)	Hawthorn	13.17 (95)	Brunswick Street Oval	11,000	28 June 1930
Melbourne	17.12 (114)	Essendon	11.22 (88)	MCG	28,344	28 June 1930
Footscray	5.14 (44)	Collingwood	19.10 (124)	Western Oval	14,000	28 June 1930
St Kilda	12.5 (77)	Carlton	13.14 (92)	Junction Oval	33,000	28 June 1930

=== Round 10 ===
Home team	Home team score	Away team	Away team score	Venue	Crowd	Date
Hawthorn	11.15 (81)	North Melbourne	11.11 (77)	Glenferrie Oval	7,000	5 July 1930
Essendon	13.20 (98)	St Kilda	9.20 (74)	Windy Hill	16,000	5 July 1930
Carlton	16.20 (116)	Collingwood	16.16 (112)	Princes Park	40,000	5 July 1930
Richmond	14.20 (104)	Melbourne	7.10 (52)	Punt Road Oval	18,000	5 July 1930
Geelong	15.8 (98)	Footscray	7.16 (58)	Corio Oval	8,000	5 July 1930
South Melbourne	13.16 (94)	Fitzroy	12.12 (84)	Lake Oval	12,000	5 July 1930

=== Round 11 ===
Home team	Home team score	Away team	Away team score	Venue	Crowd	Date
North Melbourne	6.9 (45)	South Melbourne	10.20 (80)	Arden Street Oval	7,000	12 July 1930
Fitzroy	8.14 (62)	Geelong	10.15 (75)	Brunswick Street Oval	8,000	12 July 1930
Collingwood	14.14 (98)	Essendon	9.14 (68)	Victoria Park	16,000	12 July 1930
St Kilda	5.6 (36)	Richmond	7.18 (60)	Junction Oval	19,000	12 July 1930
Melbourne	12.10 (82)	Hawthorn	6.5 (41)	MCG	8,723	12 July 1930
Footscray	8.3 (51)	Carlton	12.14 (86)	Western Oval	12,000	12 July 1930

=== Round 12 ===
Home team	Home team score	Away team	Away team score	Venue	Crowd	Date
Footscray	8.10 (58)	Melbourne	7.19 (61)	Western Oval	12,000	19 July 1930
Essendon	15.16 (106)	South Melbourne	16.12 (108)	Windy Hill	14,000	19 July 1930
Collingwood	25.17 (167)	Fitzroy	13.16 (94)	Victoria Park	14,000	19 July 1930
Carlton	15.16 (106)	Geelong	13.13 (91)	Princes Park	23,000	19 July 1930
St Kilda	18.15 (123)	North Melbourne	7.6 (48)	Junction Oval	10,000	19 July 1930
Richmond	15.19 (109)	Hawthorn	7.7 (49)	Punt Road Oval	10,000	19 July 1930

=== Round 13 ===
Home team	Home team score	Away team	Away team score	Venue	Crowd	Date
Melbourne	12.10 (82)	St Kilda	9.11 (65)	MCG	20,232	26 July 1930
South Melbourne	11.11 (77)	Richmond	10.11 (71)	Lake Oval	22,000	26 July 1930
Hawthorn	11.10 (76)	Footscray	11.7 (73)	Glenferrie Oval	9,000	26 July 1930
Geelong	13.14 (92)	Essendon	9.9 (63)	Corio Oval	10,000	26 July 1930
North Melbourne	4.15 (39)	Collingwood	18.13 (121)	Arden Street Oval	8,000	26 July 1930
Fitzroy	10.9 (69)	Carlton	10.16 (76)	Brunswick Street Oval	19,000	26 July 1930

=== Round 14 ===
Home team	Home team score	Away team	Away team score	Venue	Crowd	Date
Hawthorn	11.7 (73)	South Melbourne	14.10 (94)	Glenferrie Oval	10,000	16 August 1930
Essendon	12.19 (91)	Fitzroy	10.11 (71)	Windy Hill	9,000	16 August 1930
Collingwood	15.14 (104)	Melbourne	8.9 (57)	Victoria Park	15,000	16 August 1930
Carlton	23.17 (155)	North Melbourne	3.9 (27)	Princes Park	11,000	16 August 1930
Richmond	9.11 (65)	Geelong	10.11 (71)	Punt Road Oval	15,000	16 August 1930
St Kilda	9.7 (61)	Footscray	7.10 (52)	Junction Oval	10,000	16 August 1930

=== Round 15 ===
Home team	Home team score	Away team	Away team score	Venue	Crowd	Date
Geelong	18.17 (125)	Hawthorn	6.7 (43)	Corio Oval	9,000	23 August 1930
Footscray	8.18 (66)	South Melbourne	11.18 (84)	Western Oval	12,500	23 August 1930
Fitzroy	11.5 (71)	Richmond	8.12 (60)	Brunswick Street Oval	14,000	23 August 1930
North Melbourne	6.12 (48)	Essendon	14.11 (95)	Arden Street Oval	8,000	23 August 1930
St Kilda	14.7 (91)	Collingwood	17.13 (115)	Junction Oval	16,000	23 August 1930
Melbourne	12.11 (83)	Carlton	11.11 (77)	MCG	31,481	23 August 1930

=== Round 16 ===
Home team	Home team score	Away team	Away team score	Venue	Crowd	Date
Essendon	13.11 (89)	Melbourne	12.7 (79)	Windy Hill	15,000	30 August 1930
Collingwood	16.20 (116)	Footscray	10.17 (77)	Victoria Park	10,000	30 August 1930
Carlton	16.12 (108)	St Kilda	15.7 (97)	Princes Park	20,000	30 August 1930
Richmond	20.15 (135)	North Melbourne	5.10 (40)	Punt Road Oval	7,000	30 August 1930
South Melbourne	12.16 (88)	Geelong	15.14 (104)	Lake Oval	28,000	30 August 1930
Hawthorn	3.16 (34)	Fitzroy	15.14 (104)	Glenferrie Oval	7,000	30 August 1930

=== Round 17 ===
Home team	Home team score	Away team	Away team score	Venue	Crowd	Date
Melbourne	8.14 (62)	Richmond	12.14 (86)	MCG	25,353	6 September 1930
Footscray	15.8 (98)	Geelong	11.15 (81)	Western Oval	8,500	6 September 1930
Fitzroy	15.19 (109)	South Melbourne	14.8 (92)	Brunswick Street Oval	8,000	6 September 1930
North Melbourne	7.9 (51)	Hawthorn	9.12 (66)	Arden Street Oval	4,000	6 September 1930
St Kilda	12.18 (90)	Essendon	7.11 (53)	Junction Oval	13,000	6 September 1930
Collingwood	16.10 (106)	Carlton	12.11 (83)	Victoria Park	30,000	6 September 1930

=== Round 18 ===
Home team	Home team score	Away team	Away team score	Venue	Crowd	Date
Richmond	7.11 (53)	St Kilda	8.15 (63)	Punt Road Oval	17,000	13 September 1930
Hawthorn	12.18 (90)	Melbourne	10.17 (77)	Glenferrie Oval	5,000	13 September 1930
Carlton	10.22 (82)	Footscray	3.8 (26)	Princes Park	15,000	13 September 1930
South Melbourne	15.19 (109)	North Melbourne	5.6 (36)	Lake Oval	5,000	13 September 1930
Geelong	10.18 (78)	Fitzroy	4.14 (38)	Corio Oval	5,000	13 September 1930
Essendon	10.6 (66)	Collingwood	17.7 (109)	Windy Hill	14,000	13 September 1930

== Ladder ==
(P)	Premiers
	Qualified for finals

#	Team	P	W	L	D	PF	PA	%	Pts
1	Collingwood (P)	18	15	3	0	1931	1338	144.3	60
2	Carlton	18	15	3	0	1747	1234	141.6	60
3	Richmond	18	11	7	0	1450	1163	124.7	44
4	Geelong	18	11	7	0	1495	1259	118.7	44
5	Melbourne	18	11	7	0	1509	1441	104.7	44
6	Essendon	18	10	8	0	1495	1417	105.5	40
7	South Melbourne	18	9	9	0	1553	1553	100.0	36
8	St Kilda	18	8	10	0	1454	1435	101.3	32
9	Fitzroy	18	7	11	0	1411	1581	89.2	28
10	Hawthorn	18	6	12	0	1205	1558	77.3	24
11	Footscray	18	4	14	0	1164	1535	75.8	16
12	North Melbourne	18	1	17	0	969	1869	51.8	4

Rules for classification: 1. premiership points; 2. percentage; 3. points for
Average score: 80.5
Source: AFL Tables

== Finals series ==
All of the 1930 finals were played at the MCG so the home team in the semi-finals and preliminary final is purely the higher ranked team from the ladder but in the Grand Final the home team was the team that won the preliminary final.

=== Semi-finals ===
Home team	Score	Away team	Score	Venue	Crowd	Date
Carlton	8.21 (69)	Geelong	13.11 (89)	MCG	47,985	20 September
Collingwood	14.10 (94)	Richmond	14.7 (91)	MCG	40,218	27 September

=== Preliminary final ===
Home team	Score	Away team	Score	Venue	Crowd	Date
Collingwood	9.11 (65)	Geelong	12.19 (91)	MCG	41,495	4 October

== Season notes ==
- Harrison House at 31 Spring Street, Melbourne (at the corner of Spring Street and Flinders Lane), was officially opened as VFL headquarters.
- The Australian National Football Council introduced a substitute player, known as the 19th man. This meant that teams now had 18 "run on" players, and one "reserve" player. The 19th man could be substituted for an injured player, or for any other player for tactical reasons. Once he had been substituted, a player could not return to the field of play under any circumstances. The 19th man was paid a match fee only if he took the field.
- Collingwood won its fourth consecutive premiership; in four seasons, 1927, 1928, 1929, and 1930 Collingwood had played 82 matches, for 70 wins, 1 draw, and 11 losses. It is still the record number of consecutive premierships to this day.
- In March, the VFL accepts the Player Payments Committee recommendation that, although they may well be paid less, no senior players can be paid more than £3 for each home-and-away match (players were also to be paid if they were injured), and no more than £12 for a finals match (approx. $170 and $680 respectively in 2008 buying power); and that no additional lump-sum payments could be made. The VFL also institutes a series of penalties for breaches (fines, suspension of players and deduction of premiership points) of what rapidly became known as the "Coulter Law" (after Gordon Coulter, the Player Payment Committee's chairman).
- In round 12, Gordon Coventry kicked a record 17 goals. The same match broke the record for the highest aggregate score in league history at that time, with the two teams scoring a combined 38.33 (261).

== Awards ==
=== Brownlow Medal ===
When the VFL's Umpires Panel counted the Brownlow Medal votes that had been awarded during the 1930 season, it found that three players had been considered best on the ground on four occasions: Harry Collier of Collingwood, Allan Hopkins of Footscray, and Stan Judkins of Richmond. Upon reviewing the rules, there were two inconsistent provisions in the rules concerning Brownlow ties: one in which the umpires would meet to determine the winner, and another in which the player who earned his votes from the fewest game would break the tie; there were also three informal votes which could not be counted, one of which is understood to have ambiguously been for 'Collier', not distinguishing between Harry and brother Albert. The panel recommended that no Brownlow Medal be awarded for 1930; but the full league board of management instead decided used the 'fewest games' tiebreaker to award the medal Judkins, who had played 12 games compared with Hopkins' 15 and Collier's 18.

In 1981, the league changed Brownlow Medal rules to allow more than one player to receive the medal if tied on votes; and, in 1989, it retrospectively awarded medals to Harry Collier and Allan Hopkins for 1930. All three are now considered joint winners.

=== Other awards ===
- The 1930 VFL Premiership team was Collingwood.
- The VFL's leading goalkicker was Gordon Coventry of Collingwood with 118 goals.
  - At 5 ft 5 in (166 cm) and 9 st 9 lb (61 kg), Stan Judkins is the shortest and lightest player ever to win the Brownlow Medal.
- North Melbourne took the "wooden spoon" in 1930.
- The seconds premiership was won by Geelong, which finished the season undefeated. Geelong 14.12 (96) defeated Richmond 11.8 (74) in the final, played as a curtain-raiser to the firsts preliminary final on 4 October.
